= List of teams and cyclists in the 1985 Tour de France =

List of cyclists

The 1985 Tour de France was the 72nd edition of Tour de France, one of cycling's Grand Tours. The Tour began in Plumelec on 28 June and finished on the Champs-Élysées in Paris on 21 July. The Tour organisation invited 21 teams to the Tour, with 10 cyclists each. Three teams withdrew prior to starting. Finally 18 teams started, setting a new record of 180 riders.

== Teams ==
- Renault–Elf
- La Vie Claire
- Peugeot–Shell–Michelin
- Skil–Sem–Kas–Miko
- Reynolds
- Fagor
- Hitachi–Splendor–Sunair
- Panasonic–Raleigh
- Varta–Café de Colombia–Mavic
- Carrera–Inoxpran
- La Redoute
- Kwantum–Decosol–Yoko
- Zor–Gemeaz Cusin
- Lotto
- Verandalux–Dries–Nissan
- Seat–Orbea
- Santini
- Tönissteiner–TW Rock–BASF

== Cyclists ==
Legend
No.	Starting number worn by the rider during the Tour
Pos.	Position in the general classification
Time	Deficit to the winner of the general classification
General classification	Denotes the winner of the general classification
Points classification	Denotes the winner of the points classification
Mountains classification	Denotes the winner of the mountains classification
Young rider classification	Denotes the winner of the young rider classification
Intermediate Sprint classification	Denotes the winner of the intermediate sprints classification
Combination classification	Denotes the winner of the combination classification
Team classification	Denotes the winner of the team classification
Combativity award	Denotes the winner of the combativity award
DNF	Denotes a rider who did not finish
NP	Denotes a rider who was a non-participant
AB	Denotes a rider who abandoned
EL	Denotes a rider who was eliminated
HD	Denotes a rider who was outside the time limit (French: Hors Delai)
Age correct as of 28 June 1985, the date on which the Tour began

=== By starting number ===
No.	Name	Nationality	Team	Age	Pos.	Time	Ref
1	Philippe Chevallier	France	Renault–Elf	24	57	+ 1h 15' 19"	
2	Dominique Gaigne	France	Renault–Elf	23	116	+ 2h 23' 23"	
3	Martial Gayant	France	Renault–Elf	22	DNF (HD-15)	—	
4	Christophe Lavainne	France	Renault–Elf	21	DNF (HD-15)	—	
5	Marc Madiot	France	Renault–Elf	26	26	+ 33' 58"	
6	Yvon Madiot	France	Renault–Elf	23	72	+ 1h 35' 55"	
7	Thierry Marie	France	Renault–Elf	22	67	+ 1h 27' 50"	
8	Charly Mottet	France	Renault–Elf	22	36	+ 42' 57"	
9	Pascal Poisson	France	Renault–Elf	26	42	+ 53' 41"	
10	Denis Roux	France	Renault–Elf	23	56	+ 1h 14' 26"	
11	Bernard Hinault	France	La Vie Claire	30	1	113h 24' 23"	
12	Kim Andersen	Denmark	La Vie Claire	26	47	+ 1h 00' 32"	
13	Dominique Arnaud	France	La Vie Claire	29	22	+ 26' 28"	
14	Steve Bauer	Canada	La Vie Claire	26	10	+ 14' 57"	
15	Marc Gomez	France	La Vie Claire	30	99	+ 2h 07' 06"	
16	Christian Jourdan	France	La Vie Claire	30	71	+ 1h 34' 31"	
17	Greg LeMond	United States	La Vie Claire	24	2	+ 1' 42"	
18	Niki Rüttimann	Switzerland	La Vie Claire	22	13	+ 16' 02"	
19	Bernard Vallet	France	La Vie Claire	31	46	+ 59' 50"	
20	Alain Vigneron	France	La Vie Claire	30	44	+ 55' 45"	
21	Robert Millar	Great Britain	Peugeot–Shell–Michelin	26	11	+ 15' 10"	
22	Frédéric Brun	France	Peugeot–Shell–Michelin	27	134	+ 3h 01' 30"	
23	Francis Castaing	France	Peugeot–Shell–Michelin	26	132	+ 2h 57' 08"	
24	Gilbert Duclos-Lassalle	France	Peugeot–Shell–Michelin	30	61	+ 1h 20' 56"	
25	Robert Forest	France	Peugeot–Shell–Michelin	23	16	+ 17' 45"	
26	Yvan Frebert	France	Peugeot–Shell–Michelin	24	68	+ 1h 30' 51"	
27	Hubert Linard	France	Peugeot–Shell–Michelin	32	98	+ 2h 06' 57"	
28	Allan Peiper	Australia	Peugeot–Shell–Michelin	25	86	+ 1h 56' 54"	
29	Pascal Simon	France	Peugeot–Shell–Michelin	28	20	+ 23' 30"	
30	Sean Yates	Great Britain	Peugeot–Shell–Michelin	25	122	+ 2h 37' 36"	
31	Sean Kelly	Ireland	Skil–Sem–Kas–Miko	29	4	+ 6' 26"	
32	René Bittinger	France	Skil–Sem–Kas–Miko	30	77	+ 1h 40' 32"	
33	Éric Caritoux	France	Skil–Sem–Kas–Miko	24	34	+ 41' 53"	
34	Guy Gallopin	France	Skil–Sem–Kas–Miko	29	102	+ 2h 09' 23"	
35	Dominique Garde	France	Skil–Sem–Kas–Miko	26	35	+ 42' 26"	
36	Gilles Mas	France	Skil–Sem–Kas–Miko	24	37	+ 45' 10"	
37	Joël Pelier	France	Skil–Sem–Kas–Miko	23	78	+ 1h 43' 33"	
38	Philippe Poissonnier	France	Skil–Sem–Kas–Miko	34	90	+ 2h 00' 50"	
39	Jacques van Meer	Netherlands	Skil–Sem–Kas–Miko	27	55	+ 1h 12' 41"	
40	Frédéric Vichot	France	Skil–Sem–Kas–Miko	26	31	+ 40' 02"	
41	Enrique Aja	Spain	Reynolds	25	62	+ 1h 24' 23"	
42	Eduardo Chozas	Spain	Reynolds	24	9	+ 13' 56"	
43	Iñaki Gastón	Spain	Reynolds	22	38	+ 45' 53"	
44	Eduardo González Salvador	Spain	Reynolds	25	DNF (HD-12)	—	
45	Carlos Hernández	Spain	Reynolds	26	76	+ 1h 40' 27"	
46	Jesús Hernández Úbeda	Spain	Reynolds	25	85	+ 1h 54' 13"	
47	Miguel Indurain	Spain	Reynolds	20	DNF (AB-4)	—	
48	José Luis Laguía	Spain	Reynolds	25	DNF (AB-9)	—	
49	Francisco Navarro	Spain	Reynolds	22	DNF (HD-4)	—	
50	Celestino Prieto	Spain	Reynolds	24	17	+ 19' 48"	
51	Pedro Muñoz	Spain	Fagor	26	DNF (AB-15)	—	
52	Jean-Claude Bagot	France	Fagor	27	65	+ 1h 25' 37"	
53	Pierre Bazzo	France	Fagor	31	21	+ 23' 36"	
54	Jean-René Bernaudeau	France	Fagor	28	DNF (AB-12)	—	
55	Michel Bibollet	France	Fagor	22	133	+ 3h 00' 29"	
56	Alfons De Wolf	Belgium	Fagor	29	DNF (HD-P)	—	
57	Martin Earley	Ireland	Fagor	23	60	+ 1h 20' 36"	
58	Nico Emonds	Belgium	Fagor	24	DNF (AB-15)	—	
59	Philippe Lauraire	France	Fagor	23	138	+ 3h 15' 00"	
60	François Lemarchand	France	Fagor	24	81	+ 1h 50' 40"	
61	Claude Criquielion	Belgium	Hitachi–Splendor–Sunair	28	18	+ 21' 12"	
62	Laurent Biondi	France	Hitachi–Splendor–Sunair	25	53	+ 1h 08' 37"	
63	Hendrik Devos	Belgium	Hitachi–Splendor–Sunair	29	58	+ 1h 16' 32"	
64	Rudy Dhaenens	Belgium	Hitachi–Splendor–Sunair	24	101	+ 2h 09' 23"	
65	Rudy Matthijs	Belgium	Hitachi–Splendor–Sunair	26	135	+ 3h 03' 13"	
66	Rudy Rogiers	Belgium	Hitachi–Splendor–Sunair	24	70	+ 1h 33' 38"	
67	Dietrich Thurau	West Germany	Hitachi–Splendor–Sunair	30	DNF (EL-10)	—	
68	Patrick Toelen	Belgium	Hitachi–Splendor–Sunair	22	108	+ 2h 12' 21"	
69	Jean-Philippe Vandenbrande	Belgium	Hitachi–Splendor–Sunair	29	40	+ 48' 36"	
70	Jean-Marie Wampers	Belgium	Hitachi–Splendor–Sunair	26	117	+ 2h 24' 59"	
71	Phil Anderson	Australia	Panasonic–Raleigh	27	5	+ 7' 44"	
72	Ludo De Keulenaer	Belgium	Panasonic–Raleigh	25	126	+ 2h 39' 52"	
73	Theo de Rooij	Netherlands	Panasonic–Raleigh	28	80	+ 1h 48' 22"	
74	Johan Lammerts	Netherlands	Panasonic–Raleigh	24	75	+ 1h 40' 12"	
75	Henk Lubberding	Netherlands	Panasonic–Raleigh	31	82	+ 1h 51' 48"	
76	Guy Nulens	Belgium	Panasonic–Raleigh	27	113	+ 2h 19' 40"	
77	Steven Rooks	Netherlands	Panasonic–Raleigh	24	25	+ 33' 21"	
78	Eric Vanderaerden	Belgium	Panasonic–Raleigh	23	87	+ 1h 58' 36"	
79	Gerard Veldscholten	Netherlands	Panasonic–Raleigh	25	28	+ 35' 44"	
80	Peter Winnen	Netherlands	Panasonic–Raleigh	27	15	+ 17' 35"	
81	Luis Herrera	Colombia	Varta–Café de Colombia–Mavic	24	7	+ 12' 53"	
82	Rafael Acevedo	Colombia	Varta–Café de Colombia–Mavic	31	43	+ 54' 12"	
83	Antonio Agudelo	Colombia	Varta–Café de Colombia–Mavic	25	DNF (HD-8)	—	
84	Rogelio Arango	Colombia	Varta–Café de Colombia–Mavic	26	DNF (AB-5)	—	
85	Carlos Jaramillo	Colombia	Varta–Café de Colombia–Mavic	24	73	+ 1h 38' 52"	
86	Herman Loaiza	Colombia	Varta–Café de Colombia–Mavic	29	66	+ 1h 26' 42"	
87	Reynel Montoya	Colombia	Varta–Café de Colombia–Mavic	25	41	+ 48' 46"	
88	Néstor Mora	Colombia	Varta–Café de Colombia–Mavic	21	118	+ 2h 28' 21"	
89	Fabio Parra	Colombia	Varta–Café de Colombia–Mavic	25	8	+ 13' 35"	
90	Pablo Wilches	Colombia	Varta–Café de Colombia–Mavic	29	DNF (AB-12)	—	
91	Roberto Visentini	Italy	Carrera–Inoxpran	28	49	+ 1h 03' 08"	
92	Guido Bontempi	Italy	Carrera–Inoxpran	25	112	+ 2h 17' 15"	
93	Beat Breu	Switzerland	Carrera–Inoxpran	27	23	+ 29' 42"	
94	Czesław Lang	Poland	Carrera–Inoxpran	30	89	+ 2h 00' 49"	
95	Bruno Leali	Italy	Carrera–Inoxpran	27	DNF (AB-16)	—	
96	Erich Maechler	Switzerland	Carrera–Inoxpran	24	114	+ 2h 20' 15"	
97	Stefan Mutter	Switzerland	Carrera–Inoxpran	28	DNF (AB-20)	—	
98	Jørgen Pedersen	Denmark	Carrera–Inoxpran	25	50	+ 1h 05' 42"	
99	Giancarlo Perini	Italy	Carrera–Inoxpran	25	105	+ 2h 10' 40"	
100	Glauco Santoni	Italy	Carrera–Inoxpran	33	DNF (AB-5)	—	
101	Stephen Roche	Ireland	La Redoute	25	3	+ 4' 29"	
102	Alain Bondue	France	La Redoute	26	121	+ 2h 37' 06"	
103	Thierry Claveyrolat	France	La Redoute	26	29	+ 39' 16"	
104	Jean-Louis Gauthier	France	La Redoute	29	69	+ 1h 31' 08"	
105	Pierre Le Bigaut	France	La Redoute	25	92	+ 2h 01' 53"	
106	Paul Sherwen	Great Britain	La Redoute	29	141	+ 3h 28' 13"	
107	Jérôme Simon	France	La Redoute	24	24	+ 32' 52"	
108	Régis Simon	France	La Redoute	27	100	+ 2h 09' 03"	
109	Jean-Luc Vandenbroucke	Belgium	La Redoute	30	DNF (NP-7)	—	
110	Ferdi Van Den Haute	Belgium	La Redoute	32	119	+ 2h 28' 54"	
111	Joop Zoetemelk	Netherlands	Kwantum–Decosol–Yoko	38	12	+ 15' 24"	
112	Maarten Ducrot	Netherlands	Kwantum–Decosol–Yoko	27	84	+ 1h 53' 57"	
113	Henri Manders	Netherlands	Kwantum–Decosol–Yoko	25	91	+ 2h 01' 41"	
114	Jelle Nijdam	Netherlands	Kwantum–Decosol–Yoko	21	115	+ 2h 21' 39"	
115	Ludo Peeters	Belgium	Kwantum–Decosol–Yoko	31	48	+ 1h 01' 55"	
116	Doug Shapiro	United States	Kwantum–Decosol–Yoko	25	74	+ 1h 39' 34"	
117	Gerrit Solleveld	Netherlands	Kwantum–Decosol–Yoko	24	110	+ 2h 12' 32"	
118	Adri van der Poel	Netherlands	Kwantum–Decosol–Yoko	26	51	+ 1h 07' 29"	
119	Leo van Vliet	Netherlands	Kwantum–Decosol–Yoko	29	79	+ 1h 44' 10"	
120	Ad Wijnands	Netherlands	Kwantum–Decosol–Yoko	26	106	+ 2h 11' 08"	
121	Ángel Arroyo	Spain	Zor–Gemeaz Cusin	28	DNF (AB-1)	—	
122	Marc Durant	France	Zor–Gemeaz Cusin	30	64	+ 1h 25' 07"	
123	Juan Fernández	Spain	Zor–Gemeaz Cusin	28	DNF (NP-14)	—	
124	Anselmo Fuerte	Spain	Zor–Gemeaz Cusin	23	109	+ 2h 12' 22"	
125	Jesús Ibáñez Loyo	Spain	Zor–Gemeaz Cusin	25	DNF (AB-10)	—	
126	Peter Pieters	Netherlands	Zor–Gemeaz Cusin	23	140	+ 3h 25' 44"	
127	Álvaro Pino	Spain	Zor–Gemeaz Cusin	28	19	+ 21' 35"	
128	Francisco Rodríguez	Colombia	Zor–Gemeaz Cusin	25	DNF (AB-6)	—	
129	Jesús Rodríguez Magro	Spain	Zor–Gemeaz Cusin	25	30	+ 39' 38"	
130	Faustino Rupérez	Spain	Zor–Gemeaz Cusin	28	39	+ 46' 12"	
131	Jozef Lieckens	Belgium	Lotto	26	130	+ 2h 48' 15"	
132	Jan Baeyens	Belgium	Lotto	28	136	+ 3h 09' 36"	
133	Michel Dernies	Belgium	Lotto	24	96	+ 2h 05' 54"	
134	Yves Godimus	Belgium	Lotto	25	DNF (NP-8)	—	
135	Paul Haghedooren	Belgium	Lotto	25	33	+ 40' 37"	
136	Eric McKenzie	New Zealand	Lotto	26	127	+ 2h 40' 41"	
137	Patrick Onnockx	Belgium	Lotto	25	142	+ 3h 29' 25"	
138	Eddy Schepers	Belgium	Lotto	29	14	+ 16' 13"	
139	Marc Sergeant	Belgium	Lotto	25	59	+ 1h 19' 10"	
140	Wim Van Eynde	Belgium	Lotto	24	93	+ 2h 01' 55"	
141	Hennie Kuiper	Netherlands	Verandalux–Dries–Nissan	36	DNF (NP-15)	—	
142	Jan Bogaert	Belgium	Verandalux–Dries–Nissan	27	137	+ 3h 11' 35"	
143	Étienne De Beule	Belgium	Verandalux–Dries–Nissan	31	131	+ 2h 51' 18"	
144	Dirk Demol	Belgium	Verandalux–Dries–Nissan	25	DNF (AB-15)	—	
145	Jos Jacobs	Belgium	Verandalux–Dries–Nissan	32	124	+ 2h 38' 54"	
146	Louis Luyten	Belgium	Verandalux–Dries–Nissan	30	DNF (AB-16)	—	
147	Adri van Houwelingen	Netherlands	Verandalux–Dries–Nissan	31	88	+ 1h 59' 32"	
148	Jan van Houwelingen	Netherlands	Verandalux–Dries–Nissan	30	104	+ 2h 10' 30"	
149	Teun van Vliet	Netherlands	Verandalux–Dries–Nissan	23	DNF (AB-16)	—	
150	Gery Verlinden	Belgium	Verandalux–Dries–Nissan	31	DNF (AB-6)	—	
151	Pedro Delgado	Spain	Seat–Orbea	25	6	+ 11' 53"	
152	José del Ramo	Spain	Seat–Orbea	25	125	+ 2h 39' 40"	
153	Anastasio Greciano	Spain	Seat–Orbea	33	83	+ 1h 53' 27"	
154	Jerónimo Ibáñez	Spain	Seat–Orbea	28	DNF (AB-9)	—	
155	Jokin Mújika	Spain	Seat–Orbea	22	45	+ 55' 54"	
156	Imanol Murga	Spain	Seat–Orbea	27	94	+ 2h 02' 13"	
157	Luis Vicente Otin	Spain	Seat–Orbea	26	107	+ 2h 12' 00"	
158	Pello Ruiz Cabestany	Spain	Seat–Orbea	23	54	+ 1h 12' 06"	
159	José Salvador Sanchis	Spain	Seat–Orbea	22	128	+ 2h 41' 38"	
160	Ricardo Zúñiga	Spain	Seat–Orbea	27	DNF (AB-9)	—	
161	Lucien Van Impe	Belgium	Santini	38	27	+ 34' 16"	
162	Roberto Bressan	Italy	Santini	25	143	+ 3h 45' 20"	
163	Daniele Caroli	Italy	Santini	26	DNF (AB-16)	—	
164	Davide Cassani	Italy	Santini	24	DNF (AB-16)	—	
165	Claudio Cerri	Italy	Santini	25	DNF (AB-4)	—	
166	Claudio Fasolo	Italy	Santini	25	97	+ 2h 05' 55"	
167	Elio Festa	Italy	Santini	24	95	+ 2h 02' 21"	
168	Patrizio Gambirasio	Italy	Santini	24	DNF (AB-17)	—	
169	Giuliano Pavanello	Italy	Santini	23	139	+ 3h 16' 40"	
170	Manrico Ronchiato	Italy	Santini	24	144	+ 4h 13' 48"	
171	Paul Wellens	Belgium	Tönissteiner–TW Rock–BASF	33	32	+ 40' 20"	
172	André Lurquin	Belgium	Tönissteiner–TW Rock–BASF	23	123	+ 2h 38' 04"	
173	Stefan Morjean	Belgium	Tönissteiner–TW Rock–BASF	25	DNF (AB-6)	—	
174	Rudy Patry	Belgium	Tönissteiner–TW Rock–BASF	23	111	+ 2h 16' 46"	
175	Noël Segers	Belgium	Tönissteiner–TW Rock–BASF	25	120	+ 2h 36' 25"	
176	Benny Van Brabant	Belgium	Tönissteiner–TW Rock–BASF	26	129	+ 2h 48' 15"	
177	Luc Wallays	Belgium	Tönissteiner–TW Rock–BASF	23	DNF (NP-6)	—	
178	Jan Wijnants	Belgium	Tönissteiner–TW Rock–BASF	26	52	+ 1h 08' 23"	
179	Ludwig Wijnants	Belgium	Tönissteiner–TW Rock–BASF	28	63	+ 1h 24' 36"	
180	Aloïs Wouters	Belgium	Tönissteiner–TW Rock–BASF	22	103	+ 2h 09' 36"	

=== By team ===
Renault–Elf
No.	Rider	Pos.
1	Philippe Chevallier (FRA)	57
2	Dominique Gaigne (FRA)	116
3	Martial Gayant (FRA)	HD-15
4	Christophe Lavainne (FRA)	HD-15
5	Marc Madiot (FRA)	26
6	Yvon Madiot (FRA)	72
7	Thierry Marie (FRA)	67
8	Charly Mottet (FRA)	36
9	Pascal Poisson (FRA)	42
10	Denis Roux (FRA)	56

La Vie Claire
No.	Rider	Pos.
11	Bernard Hinault (FRA)	1
12	Kim Andersen (DEN)	47
13	Dominique Arnaud (FRA)	22
14	Steve Bauer (CAN)	10
15	Marc Gomez (FRA)	99
16	Christian Jourdan (FRA)	71
17	Greg LeMond (USA)	2
18	Niki Rüttimann (SUI)	13
19	Bernard Vallet (FRA)	46
20	Alain Vigneron (FRA)	44

Peugeot–Shell–Michelin
No.	Rider	Pos.
21	Robert Millar (GBR)	11
22	Frédéric Brun (FRA)	134
23	Francis Castaing (FRA)	132
24	Gilbert Duclos-Lassalle (FRA)	61
25	Robert Forest (FRA)	16
26	Yvan Frebert (FRA)	68
27	Hubert Linard (FRA)	98
28	Allan Peiper (AUS)	86
29	Pascal Simon (FRA)	20
30	Sean Yates (GBR)	122

Skil–Sem–Kas–Miko
No.	Rider	Pos.
31	Sean Kelly (IRL)	4
32	René Bittinger (FRA)	77
33	Éric Caritoux (FRA)	34
34	Guy Gallopin (FRA)	102
35	Dominique Garde (FRA)	35
36	Gilles Mas (FRA)	37
37	Joël Pelier (FRA)	78
38	Philippe Poissonnier (FRA)	90
39	Jacques van Meer (NED)	55
40	Frédéric Vichot (FRA)	31

Reynolds
No.	Rider	Pos.
41	Enrique Aja (ESP)	62
42	Eduardo Chozas (ESP)	9
43	Iñaki Gastón (ESP)	38
44	Eduardo González Salvador (ESP)	HD-12
45	Carlos Hernández Bailo (ESP)	76
46	Jesus Hernández (ESP)	85
47	Miguel Indurain (ESP)	AB-4
48	Jose-Luis Laguia (ESP)	AB-9
49	Francisco Navarro Fuster (ESP)	HD-4
50	Celestino Prieto (ESP)	17

Fagor
No.	Rider	Pos.
51	Pedro Muñoz (ESP)	AB-15
52	Jean-Claude Bagot (FRA)	65
53	Pierre Bazzo (FRA)	21
54	Jean-René Bernaudeau (FRA)	AB-12
55	Michel Bibollet (FRA)	133
56	Alfons De Wolf (BEL)	HD-P
57	Martin Earley (IRL)	60
58	Nico Emonds (BEL)	AB-15
59	Philippe Lauraire (FRA)	138
60	François Lemarchand (FRA)	81

Hitachi–Splendor–Sunair
No.	Rider	Pos.
61	Claude Criquielion (BEL)	18
62	Laurent Biondi (FRA)	53
63	Hendrik Devos (BEL)	58
64	Rudy Dhaenens (BEL)	101
65	Rudy Matthijs (BEL)	135
66	Rudy Rogiers (BEL)	70
67	Dietrich Thurau (FRG)	EL-10
68	Patrick Toelen (BEL)	108
69	Jean-Philippe Vandenbrande (BEL)	40
70	Jean-Marie Wampers (BEL)	117

Panasonic–Raleigh
No.	Rider	Pos.
71	Phil Anderson (AUS)	5
72	Ludo De Keulenaer (BEL)	126
73	Theo de Rooij (NED)	80
74	Johan Lammerts (NED)	75
75	Henk Lubberding (NED)	82
76	Guy Nulens (BEL)	113
77	Steven Rooks (NED)	25
78	Eric Vanderaerden (BEL)	87
79	Gerard Veldscholten (NED)	28
80	Peter Winnen (NED)	15

Varta–Café de Colombia–Mavic
No.	Rider	Pos.
81	Luis Herrera (COL)	7
82	Rafaël Antonio Acevedo (COL)	43
83	José Antonio Agudelo Gómez (COL)	HD-8
84	Rogelio Arango (COL)	AB-5
85	Carlos Jaramillo (COL)	73
86	Herman Loaiza (COL)	66
87	Reynel Montoya (COL)	41
88	Néstor Mora (COL)	118
89	Fabio Parra (COL)	8
90	Pablo Wilches (COL)	AB-12

Carrera–Inoxpran
No.	Rider	Pos.
91	Roberto Visentini (ITA)	49
92	Guido Bontempi (ITA)	112
93	Beat Breu (SUI)	23
94	Czesław Lang (POL)	89
95	Bruno Leali (ITA)	AB-16
96	Erich Maechler (SUI)	114
97	Stefan Mutter (SUI)	AB-20
98	Jørgen Pedersen (DEN)	50
99	Giancarlo Perini (ITA)	105
100	Glauco Santoni (ITA)	AB-5

La Redoute
No.	Rider	Pos.
101	Stephen Roche (IRL)	3
102	Alain Bondue (FRA)	121
103	Thierry Claveyrolat (FRA)	29
104	Jean-Louis Gauthier (FRA)	69
105	Pierre Le Bigaut (FRA)	92
106	Paul Sherwen (GBR)	141
107	Jérôme Simon (FRA)	24
108	Régis Simon (FRA)	100
109	Jean-Luc Vandenbroucke (BEL)	NP-7
110	Ferdi Van Den Haute (BEL)	119

Kwantum–Decosol–Yoko
No.	Rider	Pos.
111	Joop Zoetemelk (NED)	12
112	Maarten Ducrot (NED)	84
113	Henri Manders (NED)	91
114	Jelle Nijdam (NED)	115
115	Ludo Peeters (BEL)	48
116	Doug Shapiro (USA)	74
117	Gerrit Solleveld (NED)	110
118	Adri van der Poel (NED)	51
119	Leo van Vliet (NED)	79
120	Ad Wijnands (NED)	106

Zor–Gemeaz Cusin
No.	Rider	Pos.
121	Ángel Arroyo (ESP)	AB-1
122	Marc Durant (FRA)	64
123	Juan Fernández Martín (ESP)	NP-14
124	Anselmo Fuerte (ESP)	109
125	Jesus Ibanez (ESP)	AB-10
126	Peter Pieters (NED)	140
127	Álvaro Pino (ESP)	19
128	Francisco Rodríguez Maldonado (COL)	AB-6
129	Jesús Rodríguez Magro (ESP)	30
130	Faustino Rupérez (ESP)	39

Lotto
No.	Rider	Pos.
131	Jozef Lieckens (BEL)	130
132	Jan Baeyens (BEL)	136
133	Michel Dernies (BEL)	96
134	Yves Godimus (BEL)	NP-8
135	Paul Haghedooren (BEL)	33
136	Eric McKenzie (NZL)	127
137	Patrick Onnockx (BEL)	142
138	Eddy Schepers (BEL)	14
139	Marc Sergeant (BEL)	59
140	Wim Van Eynde (BEL)	93

Verandalux–Dries–Nissan
No.	Rider	Pos.
141	Hennie Kuiper (NED)	NP-15
142	Jan Bogaert (BEL)	137
143	Etienne De Beule (BEL)	131
144	Dirk Demol (BEL)	AB-15
145	Jos Jacobs (BEL)	124
146	Louis Luyten (BEL)	AB-16
147	Adri van Houwelingen (NED)	88
148	Jan van Houwelingen (NED)	104
149	Teun van Vliet (NED)	AB-16
150	Géry Verlinden (BEL)	AB-6

Seat–Orbea
No.	Rider	Pos.
151	Pedro Delgado (ESP)	6
152	José Del Ramo Nunez (ESP)	125
153	Anastasio Greciano (ESP)	83
154	Jeronimo Ibañez Escribano (ESP)	AB-9
155	Jokin Mújika (ESP)	45
156	Imanol Murga (ESP)	94
157	Luis Vicente Otin (ESP)	107
158	Pello Ruiz Cabestany (ESP)	54
159	José Salvador Sanchis (ESP)	128
160	Ricardo Zúñiga Carrasco (ESP)	AB-9

Santini
No.	Rider	Pos.
161	Lucien Van Impe (BEL)	27
162	Roberto Bressan (ITA)	143
163	Daniele Caroli (ITA)	AB-16
164	Davide Cassani (ITA)	AB-16
165	Claudio Cerri (ITA)	AB-4
166	Claudio Fasolo (ITA)	97
167	Elio Festa (ITA)	95
168	Patrizio Gambirasio (ITA)	AB-17
169	Giuliano Pavanello (ITA)	139
170	Manrico Ronchiato (ITA)	144

Tönissteiner–TW Rock–BASF
No.	Rider	Pos.
171	Paul Wellens (BEL)	32
172	André Lurquin (BEL)	123
173	Stefan Morjean (BEL)	AB-6
174	Rudy Patry (BEL)	111
175	Noël Segers (BEL)	120
176	Benny Van Brabant (BEL)	129
177	Luc Wallays (BEL)	NP-6
178	Jan Wijnants (BEL)	52
179	Ludwig Wijnants (BEL)	63
180	Aloïs Wouters (BEL)	103

=== By nationality ===
The 180 riders that competed in the 1985 Tour de France were represented by 16 different countries. Riders from eight countries won stages during the race; Belgium riders won the largest number of stages.

Country	No. of riders	Finishers	Stage wins
Australia	2	2	
Belgium	42	33	6 (Rudy Matthijs ×3, Ludwig Wijnants, Eric Vanderaerden ×2)
Canada	1	1	
Colombia	11	7	3 (Luis Herrera ×2, Fabio Parra)
Denmark	2	2	1 (Jørgen Pedersen)
France	45	42	5 (Bernard Hinault ×2, Francis Castaing, Frédéric Vichot, Régis Simon)
Ireland	3	3	1 (Stephen Roche)
Italy	14	8	
Netherlands	20	18	4 (Gerrit Solleveld, Henri Manders, Maarten Ducrot, Johan Lammerts)
New Zealand	1	1	
Poland	1	1	
Spain	28	18	2 (Eduardo Chozas, Pedro Delgado)
Switzerland	4	3	
Great Britain	3	3	
United States	2	2	1 (Greg LeMond)
West Germany	1	0	
Total	180	144	23 (Note: The team time trial on stage 3, won by La Vie Claire, is not counted in this total.)
