= 1985 Tour de France, Prologue to Stage 11 =

Cycling race stages

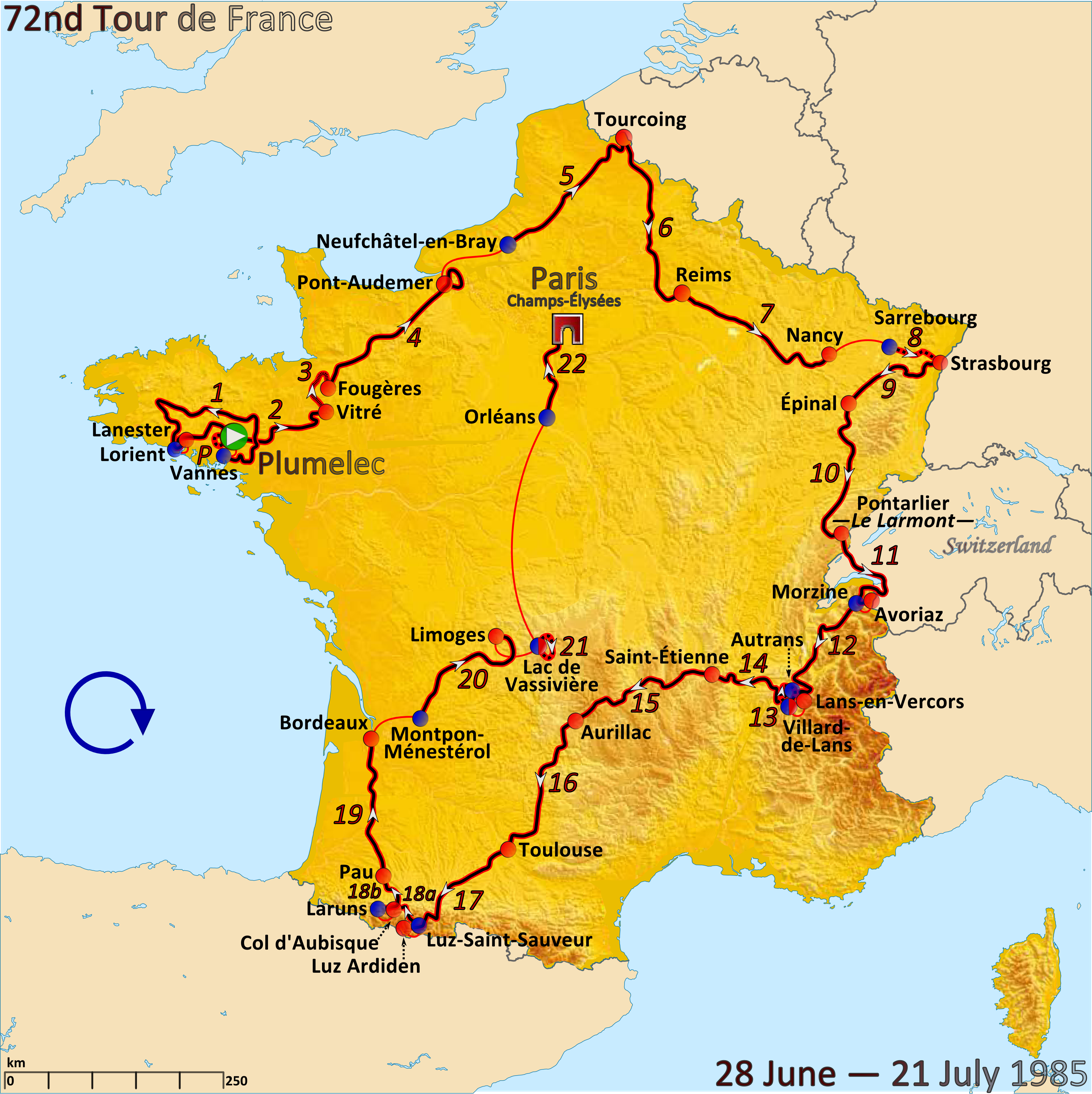
Route of the 1985 Tour de France

The 1985 Tour de France was the 72nd edition of Tour de France, one of cycling's Grand Tours. The Tour began in Plumelec with a prologue individual time trial on 28 June and Stage 11 occurred on 9 July with a mountainous stage to Morzine Avoriaz. The race finished on the Champs-Élysées in Paris on 21 July.

== Prologue ==
28 June 1985 — Plumelec, 6.8 km (4.2 mi) (ITT)

Prologue result and general classification after prologue

| Rank | Rider | Team | Time |
|---|---|---|---|
| 1 | Bernard Hinault (FRA) | La Vie Claire | 8' 47.04" |
| 2 | Eric Vanderaerden (BEL) | Panasonic–Raleigh | + 4" |
| 3 | Stephen Roche (IRL) | La Redoute | + 14" |
| 4 | Phil Anderson (AUS) | Panasonic–Raleigh | + 19" |
| 5 | Greg LeMond (USA) | La Vie Claire | + 21" |
| 6 | Steve Bauer (CAN) | La Vie Claire | + 24" |
| 7 | Allan Peiper (AUS) | Peugeot–Shell–Michelin | s.t. |
| 8 | Pello Ruiz Cabestany (ESP) | Seat–Orbea | + 25" |
| 9 | Kim Andersen (DEN) | La Vie Claire | s.t. |
| 10 | Pascal Poisson (FRA) | Renault–Elf | + 27" |

== Stage 1 ==
29 June 1985 — Vannes to Lanester, 256 km (159.1 mi)

Stage 1 result

| Rank | Rider | Team | Time |
|---|---|---|---|
| 1 | Rudy Matthijs (BEL) | Hitachi–Splendor–Sunair | 6h 32' 52" |
| 2 | Eric Vanderaerden (BEL) | Panasonic–Raleigh | s.t. |
| 3 | Sean Kelly (IRL) | Skil–Sem–Kas–Miko | s.t. |
| 4 | Guido Bontempi (ITA) | Carrera–Inoxpran | s.t. |
| 5 | Francis Castaing (FRA) | Peugeot–Shell–Michelin | s.t. |
| 6 | Kim Andersen (DEN) | La Vie Claire | s.t. |
| 7 | Jean-Philippe Vandenbrande (BEL) | Hitachi–Splendor–Sunair | s.t. |
| 8 | Eric McKenzie (NZL) | Lotto | s.t. |
| 9 | Adri van der Poel (NED) | Kwantum–Decosol–Yoko | s.t. |
| 10 | Charly Mottet (FRA) | Renault–Elf | s.t. |

General classification after stage 1

| Rank | Rider | Team | Time |
|---|---|---|---|
| 1 | Eric Vanderaerden (BEL) | Panasonic–Raleigh | 6h 41' 07" |
| 2 | Bernard Hinault (FRA) | La Vie Claire | + 32" |
| 3 | Steve Bauer (CAN) | La Vie Claire | + 43" |
| 4 | Stephen Roche (IRL) | La Redoute | + 46" |
| 5 | Rudy Matthijs (BEL) | Hitachi–Splendor–Sunair | + 47" |
| 6 | Phil Anderson (AUS) | Panasonic–Raleigh | + 51" |
| 7 | Pello Ruiz Cabestany (ESP) | Seat–Orbea | s.t. |
| 8 | Greg LeMond (USA) | La Vie Claire | + 53" |
| 9 | Allan Peiper (AUS) | Peugeot–Shell–Michelin | + 56" |
| 10 | Kim Andersen (DEN) | La Vie Claire | + 57" |

== Stage 2 ==
30 June 1985 — Lorient to Vitre, 246 km (152.9 mi)

Stage 1 result

| Rank | Rider | Team | Time |
|---|---|---|---|
| 1 | Rudy Matthijs (BEL) | Hitachi–Splendor–Sunair | 6h 29' 21" |
| 2 | Sean Kelly (IRL) | Skil–Sem–Kas–Miko | s.t. |
| 3 | Eric Vanderaerden (BEL) | Panasonic–Raleigh | s.t. |
| 4 | Francis Castaing (FRA) | Peugeot–Shell–Michelin | s.t. |
| 5 | Guido Bontempi (ITA) | Carrera–Inoxpran | s.t. |
| 6 | Michel Dernies (BEL) | Lotto | s.t. |
| 7 | Benny Van Brabant (BEL) | Tönissteiner–TW Rock–BASF | s.t. |
| 8 | Philippe Lauraire (FRA) | Fagor | s.t. |
| 9 | Eric McKenzie (NZL) | Lotto | s.t. |
| 10 | Thierry Marie (FRA) | Renault–Elf | s.t. |

General classification after stage 2

| Rank | Rider | Team | Time |
|---|---|---|---|
| 1 | Eric Vanderaerden (BEL) | Panasonic–Raleigh | 13h 09' 58" |
| 2 | Rudy Matthijs (BEL) | Hitachi–Splendor–Sunair | + 47" |
| 3 | Bernard Hinault (FRA) | La Vie Claire | + 1' 02" |
| 4 | Sean Kelly (IRL) | Skil–Sem–Kas–Miko | s.t. |
| 5 | Steve Bauer (CAN) | La Vie Claire | + 1' 13" |
| 6 | Stephen Roche (IRL) | La Redoute | + 1' 16" |
| 7 | Phil Anderson (AUS) | Panasonic–Raleigh | + 1' 21" |
| 8 | Pello Ruiz Cabestany (ESP) | Seat–Orbea | s.t. |
| 9 | Greg LeMond (USA) | La Vie Claire | + 1' 23" |
| 10 | Allan Peiper (AUS) | Peugeot–Shell–Michelin | + 1' 26" |

== Stage 3 ==
1 July 1985 — Vitre to Fougères, 73.8 km (45.9 mi) (TTT)

Stage 3 result

| Rank | Team | Time |
|---|---|---|
| 1 | La Vie Claire | 1h 30' 09" |
| 2 | Kwantum–Decosol–Yoko | + 1' 00" |
| 3 | Panasonic–Raleigh | + 1' 03" |
| 4 | Peugeot–Shell–Michelin | + 1' 12" |
| 5 | Carrera–Inoxpran | + 1' 22" |
| 6 | Renault–Elf | s.t. |
| 7 | La Redoute | + 1' 24" |
| 8 | Hitachi–Splendor–Sunair | + 2' 10" |
| 9 | Lotto | + 2' 24" |
| 10 | Skil-Sem-Kas-Miko | + 2' 52" |

General classification after stage 3

| Rank | Rider | Team | Time |
|---|---|---|---|
| 1 | Eric Vanderaerden (BEL) | Panasonic–Raleigh | 14h 40' 37" |
| 2 | Bernard Hinault (FRA) | La Vie Claire | + 32" |
| 3 | Steve Bauer (CAN) | La Vie Claire | + 43" |
| 4 | Greg LeMond (USA) | La Vie Claire | + 53" |
| 5 | Kim Andersen (DEN) | La Vie Claire | + 57" |
| 6 | Bernard Vallet (FRA) | La Vie Claire | + 59" |
| 7 | Niki Rüttimann (SUI) | La Vie Claire | + 1' 06" |
| 8 | Alain Vigneron (FRA) | La Vie Claire | + 1' 07" |
| 9 | Marc Gomez (FRA) | La Vie Claire | + 1' 08" |
| 10 | Phil Anderson (AUS) | Panasonic–Raleigh | + 1' 21" |

== Stage 4 ==
2 July 1985 — Fougères to Pont-Audemer, 239 km (149 mi)

Stage 4 result

| Rank | Rider | Team | Time |
|---|---|---|---|
| 1 | Gerrit Solleveld (NED) | Kwantum–Decosol–Yoko | 6h 31' 46" |
| 2 | Bruno Leali (ITA) | Carrera–Inoxpran | s.t. |
| 3 | Paul Haghedooren (BEL) | Lotto | s.t. |
| 4 | Hennie Kuiper (NED) | Verandalux–Dries–Nissan | s.t. |
| 5 | Gerard Veldscholten (NED) | Panasonic–Raleigh | s.t. |
| 6 | Luis Herrera (COL) | Varta–Café de Colombia–Mavic | s.t. |
| 7 | Kim Andersen (DEN) | La Vie Claire | s.t. |
| 8 | Jozef Lieckens (BEL) | Lotto | + 46" |
| 9 | Sean Kelly (IRL) | Skil–Sem–Kas–Miko | s.t. |
| 10 | Adri van der Poel (NED) | Kwantum–Decosol–Yoko | s.t. |

General classification after stage 4

| Rank | Rider | Team | Time |
|---|---|---|---|
| 1 | Kim Andersen (DEN) | La Vie Claire | 21h 12' 40" |
| 2 | Eric Vanderaerden (BEL) | Panasonic–Raleigh | + 19" |
| 3 | Bernard Hinault (FRA) | La Vie Claire | + 1' 01" |
| 4 | Steve Bauer (CAN) | La Vie Claire | + 1' 12" |
| 5 | Greg LeMond (USA) | La Vie Claire | + 1' 22" |
| 6 | Gerard Veldscholten (NED) | Panasonic–Raleigh | + 1' 25" |
| 7 | Bernard Vallet (FRA) | La Vie Claire | + 1' 28" |
| 8 | Niki Rüttimann (SUI) | La Vie Claire | + 1' 35" |
| 9 | Alain Vigneron (FRA) | La Vie Claire | + 1' 36" |
| 10 | Marc Gomez (FRA) | La Vie Claire | + 1' 37" |

== Stage 5 ==
3 July 1985 — Neufchâtel-en-Bray to Roubaix, 224 km (139 mi)

Stage 5 result

| Rank | Rider | Team | Time |
|---|---|---|---|
| 1 | Henri Manders (NED) | Kwantum–Decosol–Yoko | 6h 27' 25" |
| 2 | Sean Kelly (IRL) | Skil–Sem–Kas–Miko | + 11" |
| 3 | Phil Anderson (AUS) | Panasonic–Raleigh | s.t. |
| 4 | Eric Vanderaerden (BEL) | Panasonic–Raleigh | s.t. |
| 5 | Bernard Hinault (FRA) | La Vie Claire | s.t. |
| 6 | Ad Wijnands (NED) | Kwantum–Decosol–Yoko | s.t. |
| 7 | Leo van Vliet (NED) | Kwantum–Decosol–Yoko | s.t. |
| 8 | Allan Peiper (AUS) | Peugeot–Shell–Michelin | + 46" |
| 9 | Michel Dernies (BEL) | Lotto | s.t. |
| 10 | Jean-Louis Gauthier (FRA) | La Redoute | s.t. |

General classification after stage 5

| Rank | Rider | Team | Time |
|---|---|---|---|
| 1 | Kim Andersen (DEN) | La Vie Claire | 27h 40' 16" |
| 2 | Eric Vanderaerden (BEL) | Panasonic–Raleigh | + 19" |
| 3 | Bernard Hinault (FRA) | La Vie Claire | + 1' 01" |
| 4 | Steve Bauer (CAN) | La Vie Claire | + 1' 12" |
| 5 | Greg LeMond (USA) | La Vie Claire | + 1' 19" |
| 6 | Gerard Veldscholten (NED) | Panasonic–Raleigh | + 1' 22" |
| 7 | Phil Anderson (AUS) | Panasonic–Raleigh | + 1' 31" |
| 8 | Niki Rüttimann (SUI) | La Vie Claire | + 1' 35" |
| 9 | Marc Gomez (FRA) | La Vie Claire | + 1' 37" |
| 10 | Sean Kelly (IRL) | Skil–Sem–Kas–Miko | + 1' 49" |

== Stage 6 ==
4 July 1985 — Roubaix to Reims, 221.5 km (137.6 mi)

Stage 6 result

| Rank | Rider | Team | Time |
|---|---|---|---|
| 1 | Francis Castaing (FRA) | Peugeot–Shell–Michelin | 6h 29' 34" |
| 2 | Greg LeMond (USA) | La Vie Claire | s.t. |
| 3 | Benny Van Brabant (BEL) | Tönissteiner–TW Rock–BASF | s.t. |
| 4 | Jean-Philippe Vandenbrande (BEL) | Hitachi–Splendor–Sunair | s.t. |
| 5 | Leo van Vliet (NED) | Kwantum–Decosol–Yoko | s.t. |
| 6 | Jozef Lieckens (BEL) | Lotto | s.t. |
| 7 | Eric McKenzie (NZL) | Lotto | s.t. |
| 8 | Frédéric Vichot (FRA) | Skil–Sem–Kas–Miko | s.t. |
| 9 | Michel Dernies (BEL) | Lotto | s.t. |
| 10 | Ludwig Wijnants (BEL) | Tönissteiner–TW Rock–BASF | s.t. |

General classification after stage 6

| Rank | Rider | Team | Time |
|---|---|---|---|
| 1 | Kim Andersen (DEN) | La Vie Claire | 34h 09' 44" |
| 2 | Eric Vanderaerden (BEL) | Panasonic–Raleigh | + 40" |
| 3 | Greg LeMond (USA) | La Vie Claire | + 1' 05" |
| 4 | Bernard Hinault (FRA) | La Vie Claire | + 1' 07" |
| 5 | Steve Bauer (CAN) | La Vie Claire | + 1' 18" |
| 6 | Gerard Veldscholten (NED) | Panasonic–Raleigh | + 1' 28" |
| 7 | Phil Anderson (AUS) | Panasonic–Raleigh | + 1' 37" |
| 8 | Niki Rüttimann (SUI) | La Vie Claire | + 1' 41" |
| 9 | Sean Kelly (IRL) | Skil–Sem–Kas–Miko | s.t. |
| 10 | Marc Gomez (FRA) | La Vie Claire | + 1' 43" |

== Stage 7 ==
5 July 1985 — Reims to Nancy, 217.5 km (135.1 mi)

Stage 7 result

| Rank | Rider | Team | Time |
|---|---|---|---|
| 1 | Ludwig Wijnants (BEL) | Tönissteiner–TW Rock–BASF | 5h 55' 07" |
| 2 | Luis Herrera (COL) | Varta–Café de Colombia–Mavic | + 5" |
| 3 | Peter Winnen (NED) | Panasonic–Raleigh | s.t. |
| 4 | Iñaki Gastón (ESP) | Reynolds | s.t. |
| 5 | Wim Van Eynde (BEL) | Lotto | + 8" |
| 6 | Benny Van Brabant (BEL) | Tönissteiner–TW Rock–BASF | + 9" |
| 7 | Sean Kelly (IRL) | Skil–Sem–Kas–Miko | s.t. |
| 8 | Jean-Philippe Vandenbrande (BEL) | Hitachi–Splendor–Sunair | s.t. |
| 9 | Phil Anderson (AUS) | Panasonic–Raleigh | s.t. |
| 10 | Eric Vanderaerden (BEL) | Panasonic–Raleigh | s.t. |

General classification after stage 7

| Rank | Rider | Team | Time |
|---|---|---|---|
| 1 | Kim Andersen (DEN) | La Vie Claire | 40h 05' 00" |
| 2 | Eric Vanderaerden (BEL) | Panasonic–Raleigh | + 40" |
| 3 | Greg LeMond (USA) | La Vie Claire | + 1' 05" |
| 4 | Bernard Hinault (FRA) | La Vie Claire | + 1' 07" |
| 5 | Sean Kelly (IRL) | Skil–Sem–Kas–Miko | + 1' 09" |
| 6 | Steve Bauer (CAN) | La Vie Claire | + 1' 18" |
| 7 | Gerard Veldscholten (NED) | Panasonic–Raleigh | + 1' 28" |
| 8 | Phil Anderson (AUS) | Panasonic–Raleigh | + 1' 37" |
| 9 | Niki Rüttimann (SUI) | La Vie Claire | + 1' 41" |
| 10 | Marc Gomez (FRA) | La Vie Claire | + 1' 43" |

== Stage 8 ==
6 July 1985 — Sarrebourg to Strasbourg, 75 km (47 mi) (ITT)

Stage 8 result

| Rank | Rider | Team | Time |
|---|---|---|---|
| 1 | Bernard Hinault (FRA) | La Vie Claire | 1h 34' 55" |
| 2 | Stephen Roche (IRL) | La Redoute | + 2' 20" |
| 3 | Charly Mottet (FRA) | Renault–Elf | + 2' 26" |
| 4 | Greg LeMond (USA) | La Vie Claire | + 2' 34" |
| 5 | Pierre Bazzo (FRA) | Fagor | + 2' 42" |
| 6 | Alain Vigneron (FRA) | La Vie Claire | + 2' 52" |
| 7 | Sean Kelly (IRL) | Skil–Sem–Kas–Miko | s.t. |
| 8 | Steve Bauer (CAN) | La Vie Claire | + 3' 10" |
| 9 | Pascal Simon (FRA) | Peugeot–Shell–Michelin | + 3' 14" |
| 10 | Phil Anderson (AUS) | Panasonic–Raleigh | s.t. |

General classification after stage 8

| Rank | Rider | Team | Time |
|---|---|---|---|
| 1 | Bernard Hinault (FRA) | La Vie Claire | 41h 41' 02" |
| 2 | Greg LeMond (USA) | La Vie Claire | + 2' 32" |
| 3 | Sean Kelly (IRL) | Skil–Sem–Kas–Miko | + 2' 54" |
| 4 | Steve Bauer (CAN) | La Vie Claire | + 3' 21" |
| 5 | Phil Anderson (AUS) | Panasonic–Raleigh | + 3' 44" |
| 6 | Stephen Roche (IRL) | La Redoute | s.t. |
| 7 | Charly Mottet (FRA) | Renault–Elf | + 4' 11" |
| 8 | Pascal Simon (FRA) | Peugeot–Shell–Michelin | + 4' 23" |
| 9 | Paul Haghedooren (BEL) | Lotto | + 4' 49" |
| 10 | Eric Vanderaerden (BEL) | Panasonic–Raleigh | + 4' 50" |

== Stage 9 ==
7 July 1985 — Strasbourg to Épinal, 173.5 km (107.8 mi)

Stage 9 result

| Rank | Rider | Team | Time |
|---|---|---|---|
| 1 | Maarten Ducrot (NED) | Kwantum–Decosol–Yoko | 4h 13' 40" |
| 2 | René Bittinger (FRA) | Skil–Sem–Kas–Miko | + 37" |
| 3 | Yvon Madiot (NED) | Renault–Elf | s.t. |
| 4 | Theo De Rooij (NED) | Panasonic–Raleigh | s.t. |
| 5 | Niki Rüttimann (SUI) | La Vie Claire | s.t. |
| 6 | Sean Kelly (IRL) | Skil–Sem–Kas–Miko | + 2' 15" |
| 7 | Benny Van Brabant (BEL) | Tönissteiner–TW Rock–BASF | s.t. |
| 8 | Eric McKenzie (NZL) | Lotto | s.t. |
| 9 | Jean-Philippe Vandenbrande (BEL) | Hitachi–Splendor–Sunair | s.t. |
| 10 | Eric Vanderaerden (BEL) | Panasonic–Raleigh | s.t. |

General classification after stage 9

| Rank | Rider | Team | Time |
|---|---|---|---|
| 1 | Bernard Hinault (FRA) | La Vie Claire | 45h 56' 57" |
| 2 | Greg LeMond (USA) | La Vie Claire | + 2' 22" |
| 3 | Sean Kelly (IRL) | Skil–Sem–Kas–Miko | + 2' 51" |
| 4 | Steve Bauer (CAN) | La Vie Claire | + 3' 21" |
| 5 | Phil Anderson (AUS) | Panasonic–Raleigh | + 3' 38" |
| 6 | Stephen Roche (IRL) | La Redoute | + 3' 44" |
| 7 | Charly Mottet (FRA) | Renault–Elf | + 4' 11" |
| 8 | Pascal Simon (FRA) | Peugeot–Shell–Michelin | + 4' 23" |
| 9 | Eric Vanderaerden (BEL) | Panasonic–Raleigh | + 4' 40" |
| 10 | Paul Haghedooren (BEL) | Lotto | + 4' 49" |

== Stage 10 ==
8 July 1985 — Épinal to Pontarlier, 204.5 km (127.1 mi)

Stage 10 result

| Rank | Rider | Team | Time |
|---|---|---|---|
| 1 | Jørgen Pedersen (DEN) | Carrera–Inoxpran | 5h 06' 27" |
| 2 | Johan Lammerts (NED) | Panasonic–Raleigh | s.t. |
| 3 | Iñaki Gastón (ESP) | Reynolds | + 2" |
| 4 | Dominique Arnaud (FRA) | La Vie Claire | s.t. |
| 5 | Denis Roux (FRA) | Renault–Elf | + 41" |
| 6 | Joël Pelier (FRA) | Skil–Sem–Kas–Miko | + 47" |
| 7 | Jean-Claude Bagot (FRA) | Fagor | + 1' 00" |
| 8 | Pedro Delgado (ESP) | Seat–Orbea | + 1' 18" |
| 9 | Adri van der Poel (NED) | Kwantum–Decosol–Yoko | + 1' 27" |
| 10 | Marc Madiot (FRA) | Renault–Elf | + 1' 30" |

General classification after stage 10

| Rank | Rider | Team | Time |
|---|---|---|---|
| 1 | Bernard Hinault (FRA) | La Vie Claire | 51h 04' 57" |
| 2 | Greg LeMond (USA) | La Vie Claire | + 2' 16" |
| 3 | Sean Kelly (IRL) | Skil–Sem–Kas–Miko | + 2' 42" |
| 4 | Steve Bauer (CAN) | La Vie Claire | + 3' 21" |
| 5 | Phil Anderson (AUS) | Panasonic–Raleigh | + 3' 28" |
| 6 | Stephen Roche (IRL) | La Redoute | + 3' 44" |
| 7 | Charly Mottet (FRA) | Renault–Elf | + 4' 11" |
| 8 | Pascal Simon (FRA) | Peugeot–Shell–Michelin | + 4' 20" |
| 9 | Niki Rüttimann (SUI) | La Vie Claire | + 4' 53" |
| 10 | Paul Haghedooren (BEL) | Lotto | + 5' 12" |

== Stage 11 ==
9 July 1985 — Pontarlier to Morzine Avoriaz, 195 km (121 mi)

Stage 11 result

| Rank | Rider | Team | Time |
|---|---|---|---|
| 1 | Luis Herrera (COL) | Varta–Café de Colombia–Mavic | 5h 19' 04" |
| 2 | Bernard Hinault (FRA) | La Vie Claire | + 7" |
| 3 | Pedro Delgado (ESP) | Seat–Orbea | + 1' 23" |
| 4 | Fabio Parra (COL) | Varta–Café de Colombia–Mavic | + 1' 41" |
| 5 | Greg LeMond (USA) | La Vie Claire | s.t. |
| 6 | Stephen Roche (IRL) | La Redoute | + 2' 05" |
| 7 | Peter Winnen (NED) | Panasonic–Raleigh | s.t. |
| 8 | Robert Millar (GBR) | Peugeot–Shell–Michelin | + 2' 39" |
| 9 | Celestino Prieto (ESP) | Reynolds | + 3' 02" |
| 10 | Paul Wellens (BEL) | Tönissteiner–TW Rock–BASF | s.t. |

General classification after stage 11

| Rank | Rider | Team | Time |
|---|---|---|---|
| 1 | Bernard Hinault (FRA) | La Vie Claire | 56h 23' 58" |
| 2 | Greg LeMond (USA) | La Vie Claire | + 4' 00" |
| 3 | Stephen Roche (IRL) | La Redoute | + 5' 52" |
| 4 | Sean Kelly (IRL) | Skil–Sem–Kas–Miko | + 6' 01" |
| 5 | Phil Anderson (AUS) | Panasonic–Raleigh | + 6' 33" |
| 6 | Steve Bauer (CAN) | La Vie Claire | + 6' 50" |
| 7 | Charly Mottet (FRA) | Renault–Elf | + 7' 40" |
| 8 | Niki Rüttimann (SUI) | La Vie Claire | + 8' 06" |
| 9 | Joop Zoetemelk (NED) | Kwantum–Decosol–Yoko | + 8' 25" |
| 10 | Pascal Simon (FRA) | Peugeot–Shell–Michelin | + 8' 50" |
