= List of teams and cyclists in the 1984 Vuelta a España =

For the 1984 Vuelta a España, the field consisted of 130 riders; 97 finished the race.

== By rider ==
Legend
No.	Starting number worn by the rider during the Vuelta
Pos.	Position in the general classification
Time	Deficit to the winner of the general classification
DNF	Denotes a rider who did not finish

No.	Name	Nationality	Team	Pos.	Time	Ref
1	Juan-Carlos Alonso	Spain	Alfa Lum–Olmo	26	+ 26' 52"	
2	Marino Amadori	Italy	Alfa Lum–Olmo	DNF	—	
3	Mauro Angelucci	Italy	Alfa Lum–Olmo	87	+ 2h 10' 23"	
4	Marino Lejarreta	Spain	Alfa Lum–Olmo	DNF	—	
5	Salvatore Maccali	Italy	Alfa Lum–Olmo	39	+ 49' 54"	
6	Orlando Maini	Italy	Alfa Lum–Olmo	DNF	—	
7	Giuseppe Martinelli	Italy	Alfa Lum–Olmo	67	+ 1h 35' 22"	
8	Domenico Perani	Italy	Alfa Lum–Olmo	DNF	—	
9	Giuseppe Petito	Italy	Alfa Lum–Olmo	DNF	—	
10	Michael Wilson	Australia	Alfa Lum–Olmo	DNF	—	
11	Sabino Angoitia	Spain	Hueso	56	+ 1h 20' 28"	
12	Juan Caldentey Perello	Spain	Hueso	77	+ 1h 58' 23"	
13	Guillermo De La Peña	Spain	Hueso	16	+ 14' 25"	
14	Ángel de las Heras	Spain	Hueso	24	+ 24' 34"	
15	Juan María Eguiarte Soleagui	Spain	Hueso	48	+ 1h 00' 58"	
16	Isidro Juárez	Spain	Hueso	55	+ 1h 20' 19"	
17	Carlos Machín Rodríguez	Spain	Hueso	45	+ 54' 21"	
18	Juan Pujol Pagés	Spain	Hueso	18	+ 20' 02"	
19	Jaime Salva Lull	Spain	Hueso	54	+ 1h 18' 04"	
20	Jesús Suárez Cueva	Spain	Hueso	43	+ 52' 52"	
21	Roberto Ceruti	Italy	Del Tongo–Colnago	37	+ 49' 40"	
22	Claudio Bortolotto	Italy	Del Tongo–Colnago	DNF	—	
23	Stefano Guerrieri	Italy	Del Tongo–Colnago	DNF	—	
24	Leonardo Natale	Italy	Del Tongo–Colnago	29	+ 31' 43"	
25	Rudy Pevenage	Belgium	Del Tongo–Colnago	DNF	—	
26	Sergio Santimaria	Italy	Del Tongo–Colnago	60	+ 1h 23' 32"	
27	Alberto Saronni	Italy	Del Tongo–Colnago	61	+ 1h 24' 27"	
28	Giuseppe Saronni	Italy	Del Tongo–Colnago	DNF	—	
29	Guido Van Calster	Belgium	Del Tongo–Colnago	25	+ 25' 01"	
30	Marco Vitali	Italy	Del Tongo–Colnago	22	+ 22' 53"	
31	Mariano Bayon Magdaleno	Spain	Dormilón	86	+ 2h 09' 53"	
32	Yvon Bertin	France	Dormilón	72	+ 1h 48' 01"	
33	José Antonio Cabrero Martínez	Spain	Dormilón	69	+ 1h 37' 20"	
34	Francisco Caro Lozano	Spain	Dormilón	80	+ 2h 03' 56"	
35	José María Caroz	Spain	Dormilón	96	+ 2h 52' 46"	
36	José Rafael García Martínez	Spain	Dormilón	91	+ 2h 33' 54"	
37	Jesús Guzmán Delgado	Spain	Dormilón	52	+ 1h 10' 55"	
38	Eugenio Herranz Bautista	Spain	Dormilón	84	+ 2h 07' 23"	
39	Ludo Loos	Belgium	Dormilón	38	+ 49' 45"	
40	Jesús Rodríguez Rodríguez	Spain	Dormilón	41	+ 52' 35"	
41	Ángel Camarillo	Spain	Zor–Gemeaz Cusin	DNF	—	
42	Eduardo Chozas	Spain	Zor–Gemeaz Cusin	DNF	—	
43	Alberto Fernández	Spain	Zor–Gemeaz Cusin	2	+ 6"	
44	Juan Fernández Martín	Spain	Zor–Gemeaz Cusin	DNF	—	
45	Jesús Ignacio Ibáñez Loyo	Spain	Zor–Gemeaz Cusin	63	+ 1h 29' 33"	
46	José Luis López Cerrón	Spain	Zor–Gemeaz Cusin	65	+ 1h 32' 33"	
47	José Luis Navarro	Spain	Zor–Gemeaz Cusin	31	+ 36' 56"	
48	Álvaro Pino	Spain	Zor–Gemeaz Cusin	DNF	—	
49	Jesús Rodríguez Magro	Spain	Zor–Gemeaz Cusin	11	+ 9' 13"	
50	Faustino Rupérez	Spain	Zor–Gemeaz Cusin	21	+ 21' 08"	
51	Dave Akam	Great Britain	Gis Gelati–Tuc Lu	DNF	—	
52	Walter Dalgal	Italy	Gis Gelati–Tuc Lu	71	+ 1h 47' 40"	
53	Roger De Vlaeminck	Belgium	Gis Gelati–Tuc Lu	DNF	—	
54	Patrizio Gambirasio	Italy	Gis Gelati–Tuc Lu	92	+ 2h 35' 52"	
55	Piero Onesti	Italy	Gis Gelati–Tuc Lu	DNF	—	
56	Stefano Giuliani	Italy	Gis Gelati–Tuc Lu	90	+ 2h 30' 23"	
57	Martin Havik	Netherlands	Gis Gelati–Tuc Lu	DNF	—	
58	Palmiro Masciarelli	Italy	Gis Gelati–Tuc Lu	35	+ 43' 11"	
59	Francesco Moser	Italy	Gis Gelati–Tuc Lu	10	+ 8' 41"	
60	Ennio Salvador	Italy	Gis Gelati–Tuc Lu	DNF	—	
61	Vicente Belda	Spain	Kelme	8	+ 7' 14"	
62	Javier Castellar	Spain	Kelme	44	+ 53' 53"	
63	Antonio Esparza	Spain	Kelme	89	+ 2h 25' 45"	
64	Arsenio González	Spain	Kelme	50	+ 1h 03' 10"	
65	Miguel Ángel Iglesias	Spain	Kelme	42	+ 52' 47"	
66	Francisco López Gonzalvo	Spain	Kelme	79	+ 2h 02' 51"	
67	Antonio Llopis Ordinana	Spain	Kelme	94	+ 2h 46' 19"	
68	Ángel Ocaña	Spain	Kelme	DNF	—	
69	José Recio	Spain	Kelme	9	+ 7' 21"	
70	Juan Alberto Reig Esteban	Spain	Kelme	88	+ 2h 11' 53"	
71	Valentin Dorronsoro Uranga	Spain	Orbea–Danena	64	+ 1h 31' 37"	
72	José Del Ramo Nunez	Spain	Orbea–Danena	62	+ 1h 25' 37"	
73	Gines García Pallares	Spain	Orbea–Danena	70	+ 1h 38' 13"	
74	Jokin Mújika	Spain	Orbea–Danena	49	+ 1h 01' 13"	
75	Imanol Murga	Spain	Orbea–Danena	47	+ 1h 00' 44"	
76	Luis Vicente Otin	Spain	Orbea–Danena	27	+ 26' 57"	
77	Pello Ruiz Cabestany	Spain	Orbea–Danena	15	+ 14' 18"	
78	Miguel Ugartemendia Sargarzazu	Spain	Orbea–Danena	82	+ 2h 06' 07"	
79	Jon Koldo Urien	Spain	Orbea–Danena	33	+ 40' 09"	
80	Felipe Yáñez	Spain	Orbea–Danena	20	+ 20' 59"	
81	Enrique Aja	Spain	Reynolds	23	+ 23' 17"	
82	Ángel Arroyo	Spain	Reynolds	36	+ 46' 43"	
83	Pedro Delgado	Spain	Reynolds	4	+ 1' 43"	
84	Eduardo González Salvador	Spain	Reynolds	DNF	—	
85	Julián Gorospe	Spain	Reynolds	6	+ 4' 41"	
86	Jesús Hernández Úbeda	Spain	Reynolds	57	+ 1h 20' 33"	
87	José Luis Laguía	Spain	Reynolds	19	+ 20' 26"	
88	Celestino Prieto	Spain	Reynolds	28	+ 31' 32"	
89	Jaime Vilamajó	Spain	Reynolds	34	+ 43' 03"	
90	Ricardo Zúñiga Carrasco	Spain	Reynolds	75	+ 1h 54' 35"	
91	Luc Colijn	Belgium	Safir–Van de Ven	DNF	—	
92	Luc De Decker	Belgium	Safir–Van de Ven	95	+ 2h 47' 01"	
93	Werner Devos	Belgium	Safir–Van de Ven	DNF	—	
94	Robert D'Hont	Belgium	Safir–Van de Ven	83	+ 2h 06' 59"	
95	Diederik Foubert	Belgium	Safir–Van de Ven	85	+ 2h 09' 08"	
96	Jozef Lieckens	Belgium	Safir–Van de Ven	73	+ 1h 48' 21"	
97	Michel Pollentier	Belgium	Safir–Van de Ven	13	+ 11' 14"	
98	Marc Van Geel	Belgium	Safir–Van de Ven	DNF	—	
99	Eddy Vanhaerens	Belgium	Safir–Van de Ven	81	+ 2h 05' 31"	
100	Ronny Van Holen	Belgium	Safir–Van de Ven	59	+ 1h 23' 10"	
101	Jean-Claude Bagot	France	Skil–Reydel–Sem–Mavic	14	+ 13' 32"	
102	Éric Caritoux	France	Skil–Reydel–Sem–Mavic	1	90h 08' 03"	
103	Patrick Clerc	France	Skil–Reydel–Sem–Mavic	78	+ 2h 01' 23"	
104	Éric Dall'Armelina	France	Skil–Reydel–Sem–Mavic	DNF	—	
105	Guy Gallopin	France	Skil–Reydel–Sem–Mavic	DNF	—	
106	Jean-Claude Leclercq	France	Skil–Reydel–Sem–Mavic	DNF	—	
107	Éric Guyot	France	Skil–Reydel–Sem–Mavic	53	+ 1h 17' 14"	
108	Gilles Mas	France	Skil–Reydel–Sem–Mavic	32	+ 39' 43"	
109	Philippe Poissonnier	France	Skil–Reydel–Sem–Mavic	58	+ 1h 21' 33"	
110	Alain Von Allmen	Switzerland	Skil–Reydel–Sem–Mavic	68	+ 1h 35' 29"	
111	Jesús Blanco Villar	Spain	Teka	30	+ 32' 00"	
112	Antonio Coll	Spain	Teka	12	+ 10' 56"	
113	Edgar Corredor	Colombia	Teka	5	+ 3' 40"	
114	Faustino Cuelli	Spain	Teka	40	+ 51' 20"	
115	Noël Dejonckheere	Belgium	Teka	74	+ 1h 51' 43"	
116	Reimund Dietzen	West Germany	Teka	3	+ 1' 33"	
117	Federico Echave	Spain	Teka	17	+ 18' 43"	
118	José Patrocinio Jiménez	Colombia	Teka	7	+ 7' 10"	
119	Nico Emonds	Belgium	Teka	DNF	—	
120	René Martens	Belgium	Teka	51	+ 1h 10' 31"	
121	Jan Wijnants	Belgium	Tönissteiner–Lotto–Mavic	46	+ 1h 00' 03"	
122	Marc Goossens	Belgium	Tönissteiner–Lotto–Mavic	76	+ 1h 56' 56"	
123	André Lurquin	Belgium	Tönissteiner–Lotto–Mavic	DNF	—	
124	Stefan Morjean	Belgium	Tönissteiner–Lotto–Mavic	DNF	—	
125	Rudy Patry	Belgium	Tönissteiner–Lotto–Mavic	DNF	—	
126	Daniel Rossel	Belgium	Tönissteiner–Lotto–Mavic	93	+ 2h 38' 25"	
127	Danny Van Baelen	Belgium	Tönissteiner–Lotto–Mavic	97	+ 2h 53' 51"	
128	Benny Van Brabant	Belgium	Tönissteiner–Lotto–Mavic	66	+ 1h 33' 13"	
129	Francis Vermaelen	Belgium	Tönissteiner–Lotto–Mavic	DNF	—	
130	Luc Wallays	Belgium	Tönissteiner–Lotto–Mavic	DNF	—	
