= 1985 Tour de France, Stage 12 to Stage 22 =

Cycling race stages

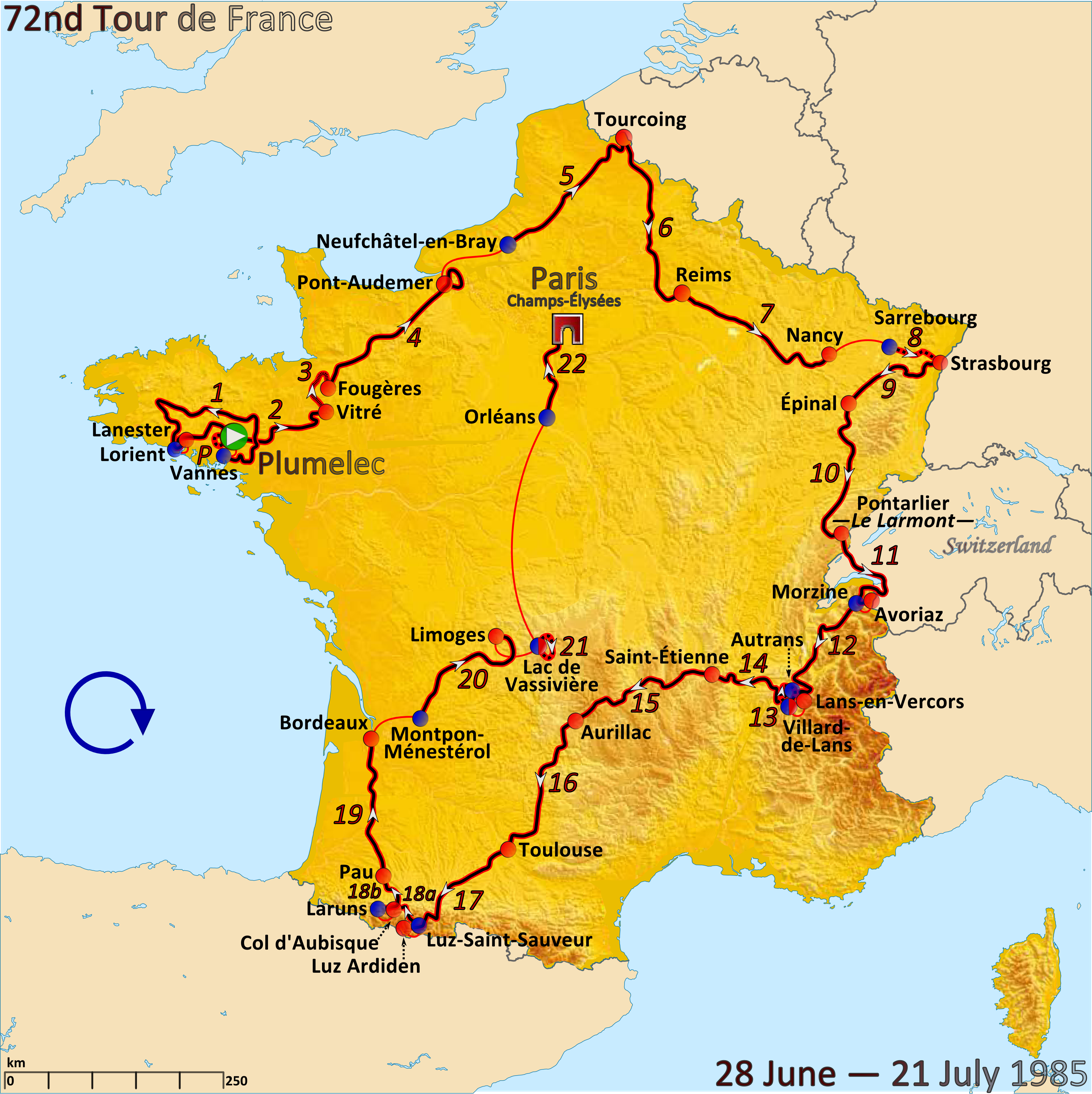
Route of the 1985 Tour de France

The 1985 Tour de France was the 72nd edition of Tour de France, one of cycling's Grand Tours. The Tour began in Plumelec with a prologue individual time trial on 28 June and Stage 12 occurred on 10 July with a mountainous stage from Morzine. The race finished on the Champs-Élysées in Paris on 21 July.

== Stage 12 ==
10 July 1985 — Morzine to Lans-en-Vercors, 269 km (167.1 mi)

Stage 12 result

Rank	Rider	Team	Time
1	Fabio Parra (COL)	Varta–Café de Colombia–Mavic	8h 25' 31"
2	Luis Herrera (COL)	Varta–Café de Colombia–Mavic	s.t.
3	Sean Kelly (IRL)	Skil–Sem–Kas–Miko	+ 38"
4	Niki Rüttimann (SUI)	La Vie Claire	s.t.
5	Stephen Roche (IRL)	La Redoute	+ 39"
6	Jesús Rodríguez Magro (ESP)	Zor–Gemeaz Cusin	s.t.
7	Dominique Arnaud (FRA)	La Vie Claire	s.t.
8	Pascal Simon (FRA)	Peugeot–Shell–Michelin	s.t.
9	Marc Madiot (FRA)	Renault–Elf	s.t.
10	Greg LeMond (USA)	La Vie Claire	s.t.

General classification after stage 12

Rank	Rider	Team	Time
1	Bernard Hinault (FRA)	La Vie Claire	64h 50' 08"
2	Greg LeMond (USA)	La Vie Claire	+ 4' 00"
3	Stephen Roche (IRL)	La Redoute	+ 5' 52"
4	Sean Kelly (IRL)	Skil–Sem–Kas–Miko	+ 6' 00"
5	Steve Bauer (CAN)	La Vie Claire	+ 7' 17"
6	Niki Rüttimann (SUI)	La Vie Claire	+ 8' 05"
7	Phil Anderson (AUS)	Panasonic–Raleigh	+ 8' 09"
8	Joop Zoetemelk (NED)	Kwantum–Decosol–Yoko	+ 8' 25"
9	Pascal Simon (FRA)	Peugeot–Shell–Michelin	+ 8' 50"
10	Pierre Bazzo (FRA)	Fagor	+ 8' 51"

== Stage 13 ==
11 July 1985 — Villard-de-Lans, 31.8 km (19.8 mi) (ITT)

Stage 13 result

Rank	Rider	Team	Time
1	Eric Vanderaerden (BEL)	Panasonic–Raleigh	41' 04"
2	Bernard Hinault (FRA)	La Vie Claire	+ 1' 07"
3	Thierry Marie (FRA)	Renault–Elf	+ 1' 08"
4	Gilbert Duclos-Lassalle (FRA)	Peugeot–Shell–Michelin	+ 1' 17"
5	Marc Sergeant (BEL)	Lotto	+ 1' 23"
6	Stephen Roche (IRL)	La Redoute	s.t.
7	Joël Pelier (FRA)	Skil–Sem–Kas–Miko	+ 1' 27"
8	Phil Anderson (AUS)	Panasonic–Raleigh	+ 1' 31"
9	Iñaki Gastón (ESP)	Reynolds	+ 1' 39"
10	Sean Kelly (IRL)	Skil–Sem–Kas–Miko	+ 1' 42"

General classification after stage 13

Rank	Rider	Team	Time
1	Bernard Hinault (FRA)	La Vie Claire	65h 32' 19"
2	Greg LeMond (USA)	La Vie Claire	+ 5' 23"
3	Stephen Roche (IRL)	La Redoute	+ 6' 08"
4	Sean Kelly (IRL)	Skil–Sem–Kas–Miko	+ 6' 35"
5	Steve Bauer (CAN)	La Vie Claire	+ 8' 23"
6	Phil Anderson (AUS)	Panasonic–Raleigh	+ 8' 33"
7	Niki Rüttimann (SUI)	La Vie Claire	+ 10' 31"
8	Pascal Simon (FRA)	Peugeot–Shell–Michelin	+ 11' 11"
9	Joop Zoetemelk (NED)	Kwantum–Decosol–Yoko	+ 11' 14"
10	Pierre Bazzo (FRA)	Fagor	+ 12' 39"

== Stage 14 ==
13 July 1985 — Autrans to Saint-Étienne, 179 km (111 mi)

Stage 14 result

Rank	Rider	Team	Time
1	Luis Herrera (COL)	Varta–Café de Colombia–Mavic	4h 56' 32"
2	Ludo Peeters (BEL)	Kwantum–Decosol–Yoko	+ 47"
3	Greg LeMond (USA)	La Vie Claire	s.t.
4	Robert Forest (FRA)	Peugeot–Shell–Michelin	s.t.
5	Eddy Schepers (BEL)	Lotto	s.t.
6	Paul Wellens (BEL)	Tönissteiner–TW Rock–BASF	s.t.
7	Pedro Delgado (ESP)	Seat–Orbea	s.t.
8	Robert Millar (GBR)	Peugeot–Shell–Michelin	s.t.
9	Fabio Parra (COL)	Varta–Café de Colombia–Mavic	+ 49"
10	Steve Bauer (CAN)	La Vie Claire	+ 2' 32"

General classification after stage 14

Rank	Rider	Team	Time
1	Bernard Hinault (FRA)	La Vie Claire	70h 31' 23"
2	Greg LeMond (USA)	La Vie Claire	+ 3' 32"
3	Stephen Roche (IRL)	La Redoute	+ 6' 14"
4	Sean Kelly (IRL)	Skil–Sem–Kas–Miko	+ 7' 36"
5	Steve Bauer (CAN)	La Vie Claire	+ 8' 23"
6	Phil Anderson (AUS)	Panasonic–Raleigh	+ 8' 33"
7	Joop Zoetemelk (NED)	Kwantum–Decosol–Yoko	+ 11' 20"
8	Niki Rüttimann (SUI)	La Vie Claire	+ 11' 32"
9	Fabio Parra (COL)	Varta–Café de Colombia–Mavic	+ 11' 38"
10	Robert Millar (GBR)	Peugeot–Shell–Michelin	+ 11' 56"

== Stage 15 ==
14 July 1985 — Saint-Étienne to Aurillac, 237.5 km (147.6 mi)

Stage 15 result

Rank	Rider	Team	Time
1	Eduardo Chozas (ESP)	Reynolds	7h 08' 42"
2	Ludo Peeters (BEL)	Kwantum–Decosol–Yoko	+ 9' 51"
3	Sean Kelly (IRL)	Skil–Sem–Kas–Miko	+ 9' 54"
4	Greg LeMond (USA)	La Vie Claire	s.t.
5	Jean-Philippe Vandenbrande (BEL)	Hitachi–Splendor–Sunair	s.t.
6	Leo van Vliet (NED)	Kwantum–Decosol–Yoko	s.t.
7	Adri van der Poel (NED)	Kwantum–Decosol–Yoko	s.t.
8	Bernard Hinault (FRA)	La Vie Claire	s.t.
9	Marc Sergeant (BEL)	Lotto	s.t.
10	Ludwig Wijnants (BEL)	Tönissteiner–TW Rock–BASF	s.t.

General classification after stage 15

Rank	Rider	Team	Time
1	Bernard Hinault (FRA)	La Vie Claire	77h 49' 59"
2	Greg LeMond (USA)	La Vie Claire	+ 3' 32"
3	Stephen Roche (IRL)	La Redoute	+ 6' 14"
4	Sean Kelly (IRL)	Skil–Sem–Kas–Miko	+ 7' 26"
5	Steve Bauer (CAN)	La Vie Claire	+ 8' 23"
6	Phil Anderson (AUS)	Panasonic–Raleigh	+ 8' 33"
7	Eduardo Chozas (ESP)	Reynolds	+ 8' 55"
8	Joop Zoetemelk (NED)	Kwantum–Decosol–Yoko	+ 11' 20"
9	Niki Rüttimann (SUI)	La Vie Claire	+ 11' 32"
10	Fabio Parra (COL)	Varta–Café de Colombia–Mavic	+ 11' 38"

== Stage 16 ==
15 July 1985 — Aurillac to Toulouse, 247 km (153 mi)

Stage 16 result

Rank	Rider	Team	Time
1	Frédéric Vichot (FRA)	Skil–Sem–Kas–Miko	6h 31' 54"
2	Charly Mottet (FRA)	Kwantum–Decosol–Yoko	+ 3' 12"
3	Guido Bontempi (ITA)	Carrera–Inoxpran	+ 3' 15"
4	Jozef Lieckens (BEL)	Lotto	s.t.
5	Francis Castaing (FRA)	Peugeot–Shell–Michelin	s.t.
6	Sean Kelly (IRL)	Skil–Sem–Kas–Miko	s.t.
7	Eric Vanderaerden (BEL)	Panasonic–Raleigh	s.t.
8	Adri van der Poel (NED)	Kwantum–Decosol–Yoko	s.t.
9	Leo van Vliet (NED)	Kwantum–Decosol–Yoko	s.t.
10	Stefan Mutter (SUI)	Carrera–Inoxpran	s.t.

General classification after stage 16

Rank	Rider	Team	Time
1	Bernard Hinault (FRA)	La Vie Claire	84h 25' 02"
2	Greg LeMond (USA)	La Vie Claire	+ 3' 38"
3	Stephen Roche (IRL)	La Redoute	+ 6' 14"
4	Sean Kelly (IRL)	Skil–Sem–Kas–Miko	+ 7' 32"
5	Steve Bauer (CAN)	La Vie Claire	+ 8' 23"
6	Phil Anderson (AUS)	Panasonic–Raleigh	+ 8' 26"
7	Eduardo Chozas (ESP)	Reynolds	+ 9' 01"
8	Joop Zoetemelk (NED)	Kwantum–Decosol–Yoko	+ 11' 20"
9	Niki Rüttimann (SUI)	La Vie Claire	+ 11' 38"
10	Fabio Parra (COL)	Varta–Café de Colombia–Mavic	+ 11' 44"

== Stage 17 ==
16 July 1985 — Toulouse to Luz Ardiden, 209.5 km (130.2 mi)

Stage 17 result

Rank	Rider	Team	Time
1	Pedro Delgado (ESP)	Seat–Orbea	6h 57' 21"
2	Luis Herrera (COL)	Varta–Café de Colombia–Mavic	+ 25"
3	Fabio Parra (COL)	Varta–Café de Colombia–Mavic	+ 1' 29"
4	Sean Kelly (IRL)	Skil–Sem–Kas–Miko	+ 2' 52"
5	Greg LeMond (USA)	La Vie Claire	s.t.
6	Jesús Rodríguez Magro (ESP)	Zor–Gemeaz Cusin	+ 2' 54"
7	Celestino Prieto (ESP)	Reynolds	s.t.
8	Phil Anderson (AUS)	Panasonic–Raleigh	s.t.
9	Eddy Schepers (BEL)	Lotto	s.t.
10	Peter Winnen (NED)	Panasonic–Raleigh	s.t.

General classification after stage 17

Rank	Rider	Team	Time
1	Bernard Hinault (FRA)	La Vie Claire	91h 26' 28"
2	Greg LeMond (USA)	La Vie Claire	+ 2' 25"
3	Stephen Roche (IRL)	La Redoute	+ 5' 00"
4	Sean Kelly (IRL)	Skil–Sem–Kas–Miko	+ 6' 19"
5	Phil Anderson (AUS)	Panasonic–Raleigh	+ 7' 28"
6	Pedro Delgado (ESP)	Seat–Orbea	+ 8' 18"
7	Luis Herrera (COL)	Varta–Café de Colombia–Mavic	+ 8' 42"
8	Fabio Parra (COL)	Varta–Café de Colombia–Mavic	+ 9' 08"
9	Eduardo Chozas (ESP)	Reynolds	+ 9' 21"
10	Joop Zoetemelk (NED)	Kwantum–Decosol–Yoko	+ 10' 09"

== Stage 18a ==
17 July 1985 — Luz-Saint-Sauveur to Aubisque, 52.5 km (32.6 mi)

Stage 18a result

Rank	Rider	Team	Time
1	Stephen Roche (IRL)	La Redoute	1h 39' 19"
2	Sean Kelly (IRL)	Skil–Sem–Kas–Miko	+ 1' 03"
3	Paul Wellens (BEL)	Tönissteiner–TW Rock–BASF	+ 1' 07"
4	Luis Herrera (COL)	Varta–Café de Colombia–Mavic	+ 1' 15"
5	Phil Anderson (AUS)	Panasonic–Raleigh	s.t.
6	Pedro Delgado (ESP)	Seat–Orbea	s.t.
7	Greg LeMond (USA)	La Vie Claire	s.t.
8	Bernard Hinault (FRA)	La Vie Claire	+ 1' 30"
9	Beat Breu (SUI)	Carrera–Inoxpran	s.t.
10	Niki Rüttimann (SUI)	La Vie Claire	+ 1' 56"

General classification after stage 18a

Rank	Rider	Team	Time
1	Bernard Hinault (FRA)	La Vie Claire	93h 07' 17"
2	Greg LeMond (USA)	La Vie Claire	+ 2' 10"
3	Stephen Roche (IRL)	La Redoute	+ 3' 30"
4	Sean Kelly (IRL)	Skil–Sem–Kas–Miko	+ 5' 52"
5	Phil Anderson (AUS)	Panasonic–Raleigh	+ 7' 13"
6	Pedro Delgado (ESP)	Seat–Orbea	+ 8' 03"
7	Luis Herrera (COL)	Varta–Café de Colombia–Mavic	+ 8' 27"
8	Fabio Parra (COL)	Varta–Café de Colombia–Mavic	+ 9' 48"
9	Eduardo Chozas (ESP)	Reynolds	+ 11' 05"
10	Joop Zoetemelk (NED)	Kwantum–Decosol–Yoko	+ 11' 53"

== Stage 18b ==
17 July 1985 — Laruns to Pau, 83.5 km (51.9 mi)

Stage 18b result

Rank	Rider	Team	Time
1	Régis Simon (FRA)	La Redoute	2h 22' 55"
2	Álvaro Pino (ESP)	Zor–Gemeaz Cusin	s.t.
3	Sean Kelly (IRL)	Skil–Sem–Kas–Miko	+ 1' 07"
4	Adri van der Poel (NED)	Kwantum–Decosol–Yoko	s.t.
5	Stephen Roche (IRL)	La Redoute	s.t.
6	Greg LeMond (USA)	La Vie Claire	s.t.
7	Phil Anderson (AUS)	Panasonic–Raleigh	s.t.
8	Eddy Schepers (BEL)	Lotto	s.t.
9	Pello Ruiz Cabestany (ESP)	Seat–Orbea	s.t.
10	Iñaki Gastón (ESP)	Reynolds	s.t.

General classification after stage 18b

Rank	Rider	Team	Time
1	Bernard Hinault (FRA)	La Vie Claire	95h 31' 16"
2	Greg LeMond (USA)	La Vie Claire	+ 2' 13"
3	Stephen Roche (IRL)	La Redoute	+ 3' 33"
4	Sean Kelly (IRL)	Skil–Sem–Kas–Miko	+ 5' 55"
5	Phil Anderson (AUS)	Panasonic–Raleigh	+ 7' 16"
6	Pedro Delgado (ESP)	Seat–Orbea	+ 8' 06"
7	Luis Herrera (COL)	Varta–Café de Colombia–Mavic	+ 8' 30"
8	Fabio Parra (COL)	Varta–Café de Colombia–Mavic	+ 9' 51"
9	Eduardo Chozas (ESP)	Reynolds	+ 11' 08"
10	Joop Zoetemelk (NED)	Kwantum–Decosol–Yoko	+ 11' 56"

== Stage 19 ==
18 July 1985 — Pau to Bordeaux, 203 km (126 mi)

Stage 19 result

Rank	Rider	Team	Time
1	Eric Vanderaerden (BEL)	Panasonic–Raleigh	5h 42' 13"
2	Sean Kelly (IRL)	Skil–Sem–Kas–Miko	s.t.
3	Francis Castaing (FRA)	Peugeot–Shell–Michelin	s.t.
4	Jozef Lieckens (BEL)	Lotto	s.t.
5	Benny Van Brabant (BEL)	Tönissteiner–TW Rock–BASF	s.t.
6	Rudy Matthijs (BEL)	Hitachi–Splendor–Sunair	s.t.
7	Eric McKenzie (NZL)	Lotto	s.t.
8	Greg LeMond (USA)	La Vie Claire	s.t.
9	Thierry Marie (FRA)	Renault–Elf	s.t.
10	Adri van der Poel (NED)	Kwantum–Decosol–Yoko	s.t.

General classification after stage 19

Rank	Rider	Team	Time
1	Bernard Hinault (FRA)	La Vie Claire	101h 13' 29"
2	Greg LeMond (USA)	La Vie Claire	+ 2' 13"
3	Stephen Roche (IRL)	La Redoute	+ 3' 33"
4	Sean Kelly (IRL)	Skil–Sem–Kas–Miko	+ 5' 35"
5	Phil Anderson (AUS)	Panasonic–Raleigh	+ 7' 16"
6	Pedro Delgado (ESP)	Seat–Orbea	+ 8' 24"
7	Luis Herrera (COL)	Varta–Café de Colombia–Mavic	+ 8' 48"
8	Fabio Parra (COL)	Varta–Café de Colombia–Mavic	+ 10' 09"
9	Eduardo Chozas (ESP)	Reynolds	+ 11' 03"
10	Niki Rüttimann (SUI)	La Vie Claire	+ 12' 12"

== Stage 20 ==
19 July 1985 — Montpon-Ménestérol to Limoges, 225 km (140 mi)

Stage 20 result

Rank	Rider	Team	Time
1	Johan Lammerts (NED)	Panasonic–Raleigh	5h 53' 10"
2	Kim Andersen (DEN)	La Vie Claire	+ 21"
3	Ludo Peeters (BEL)	Kwantum–Decosol–Yoko	+ 22"
4	Rudy Dhaenens (BEL)	Hitachi–Splendor–Sunair	s.t.
5	Giancarlo Perini (ITA)	Carrera–Inoxpran	s.t.
6	Leo van Vliet (NED)	Kwantum–Decosol–Yoko	+ 52"
7	Theo De Rooij (NED)	Panasonic–Raleigh	s.t.
8	Bernard Hinault (FRA)	La Vie Claire	s.t.
9	Benny Van Brabant (BEL)	Tönissteiner–TW Rock–BASF	s.t.
10	Thierry Claveyrolat (FRA)	La Redoute	+ 54"

General classification after stage 20

Rank	Rider	Team	Time
1	Bernard Hinault (FRA)	La Vie Claire	107h 07' 31"
2	Greg LeMond (USA)	La Vie Claire	+ 1' 59"
3	Stephen Roche (IRL)	La Redoute	+ 3' 35"
4	Sean Kelly (IRL)	Skil–Sem–Kas–Miko	+ 5' 37"
5	Phil Anderson (AUS)	Panasonic–Raleigh	+ 7' 18"
6	Pedro Delgado (ESP)	Seat–Orbea	+ 8' 26"
7	Luis Herrera (COL)	Varta–Café de Colombia–Mavic	+ 8' 50"
8	Fabio Parra (COL)	Varta–Café de Colombia–Mavic	+ 10' 11"
9	Eduardo Chozas (ESP)	Reynolds	+ 10' 50"
10	Niki Rüttimann (SUI)	La Vie Claire	+ 12' 14"

== Stage 21 ==
20 July 1985 — Lac de Vassivière, 47.5 km (29.5 mi) (ITT)

Stage 21 result

Rank	Rider	Team	Time
1	Greg LeMond (USA)	La Vie Claire	1h 02' 51"
2	Bernard Hinault (FRA)	La Vie Claire	+ 5"
3	Phil Anderson (AUS)	Panasonic–Raleigh	+ 31"
4	Sean Kelly (IRL)	Skil–Sem–Kas–Miko	+ 54"
5	Stephen Roche (IRL)	La Redoute	+ 59"
6	Thierry Marie (FRA)	Renault–Elf	+ 1' 29"
7	Steve Bauer (CAN)	La Vie Claire	+ 1' 43"
8	Marc Sergeant (BEL)	Lotto	+ 2' 30"
9	Joël Pelier (FRA)	Skil–Sem–Kas–Miko	+ 2' 35"
10	Eddy Schepers (BEL)	Lotto	+ 2' 39"

General classification after stage 21

Rank	Rider	Team	Time
1	Bernard Hinault (FRA)	La Vie Claire	108h 10' 27"
2	Greg LeMond (USA)	La Vie Claire	+ 1' 54"
3	Stephen Roche (IRL)	La Redoute	+ 4' 29"
4	Sean Kelly (IRL)	Skil–Sem–Kas–Miko	+ 6' 26"
5	Phil Anderson (AUS)	Panasonic–Raleigh	+ 7' 44"
6	Pedro Delgado (ESP)	Seat–Orbea	+ 11' 53"
7	Luis Herrera (COL)	Varta–Café de Colombia–Mavic	+ 12' 53"
8	Fabio Parra (COL)	Varta–Café de Colombia–Mavic	+ 13' 35"
9	Eduardo Chozas (ESP)	Reynolds	+ 13' 59"
10	Steve Bauer (CAN)	La Vie Claire	+ 15' 07"

== Stage 22 ==
21 July 1985 — Orléans to Paris Champs-Élysées, 196 km (122 mi)

Stage 22 result

Rank	Rider	Team	Time
1	Rudy Matthijs (BEL)	Hitachi–Splendor–Sunair	5h 13' 56"
2	Sean Kelly (IRL)	Skil–Sem–Kas–Miko	s.t.
3	Francis Castaing (FRA)	Peugeot–Shell–Michelin	s.t.
4	Guido Bontempi (ITA)	Carrera–Inoxpran	s.t.
5	Steve Bauer (CAN)	La Vie Claire	s.t.
6	Eric Vanderaerden (BEL)	Panasonic–Raleigh	s.t.
7	Jozef Lieckens (BEL)	Lotto	s.t.
8	Eric McKenzie (NZL)	Lotto	s.t.
9	Benny Van Brabant (BEL)	Tönissteiner–TW Rock–BASF	s.t.
10	Adri van der Poel (NED)	Kwantum–Decosol–Yoko	s.t.

General classification after stage 22

Rank	Rider	Team	Time
1	Bernard Hinault (FRA)	La Vie Claire	113h 24' 23"
2	Greg LeMond (USA)	La Vie Claire	+ 1' 42"
3	Stephen Roche (IRL)	La Redoute	+ 4' 29"
4	Sean Kelly (IRL)	Skil–Sem–Kas–Miko	+ 6' 26"
5	Phil Anderson (AUS)	Panasonic–Raleigh	+ 7' 44"
6	Pedro Delgado (ESP)	Seat–Orbea	+ 11' 53"
7	Luis Herrera (COL)	Varta–Café de Colombia–Mavic	+ 12' 53"
8	Fabio Parra (COL)	Varta–Café de Colombia–Mavic	+ 13' 35"
9	Eduardo Chozas (ESP)	Reynolds	+ 13' 56"
10	Steve Bauer (CAN)	La Vie Claire	+ 14' 57"
