= 1985 Milan–San Remo =

Race details
- Dates: 16 March 1985
- Stages: 1
- Distance: 294 km (183 mi)
- Winning time: 7h 36' 34"

Results
	Winner	Hennie Kuiper (NED)	(Verandalux–Dries)
	Second	Teun van Vliet (NED)	(Verandalux–Dries)
	Third	Silvano Riccò (ITA)	(Dromedario-Laminox-Fibok)

The 1985 Milan–San Remo was the 76th edition of the Milan–San Remo cycle race and was held on 16 March 1985. The race started in Milan and finished in San Remo. The race was won by Hennie Kuiper of the Verandalux–Dries team.

== General classification ==
Final general classification

Rank	Rider	Team	Time
1	Hennie Kuiper (NED)	Verandalux–Dries	7h 36' 34"
2	Teun van Vliet (NED)	Verandalux–Dries	+ 8"
3	Silvano Riccò (ITA)	Dromedario-Laminox-Fibok	+ 8"
4	Eric Vanderaerden (BEL)	Panasonic–Raleigh	+ 11"
5	Giovanni Mantovani (ITA)	Supermercati Brianzoli	+ 11"
6	Francis Castaing (FRA)	Peugeot–Shell–Michelin	+ 11"
7	Sean Kelly (IRL)	Skil–Sem–Kas–Miko	+ 11"
8	Urs Freuler (SUI)	Atala	+ 11"
9	Steve Bauer (CAN)	La Vie Claire	+ 11"
10	Etienne De Wilde (BEL)	Safir–Van de Ven	+ 11"
