= Bruno Geuens =

Belgian cyclist

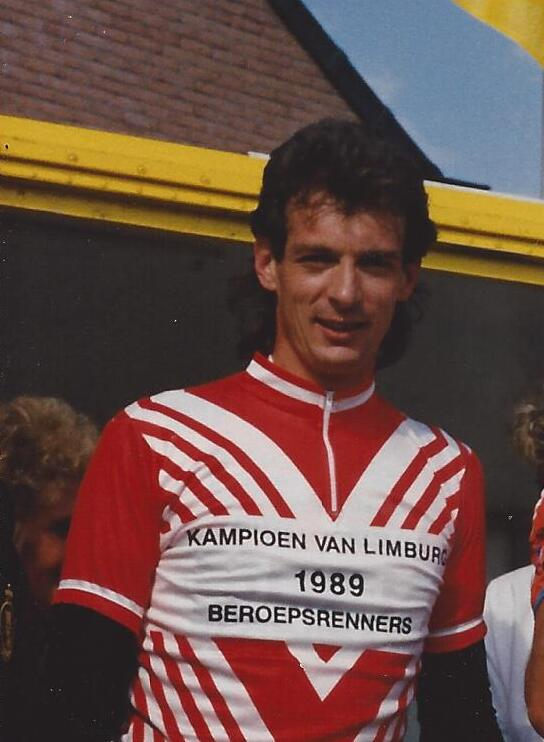

Personal information
- Full name: Bruno Geuens
- Born: 20 October 1963 (age 62) Belgium

Cycling career
- Sport: Cycling
- Current team: Retired
- Discipline: Road
- Role: Rider

Professional teams
- 1985: Verandalux–Dries
- 1986: Fangio–Lois–Mavic
- 1987–1988: Roland–Skala
- 1989–1991: S.E.F.B.–Galli–Vlan–Bulo–Opel

Bruno Geuens (born 20 October 1963) is a Belgian former professional racing cyclist. He rode in the 1988 Paris–Roubaix and finished in 52nd.

== Major results ==
1985
2nd Ronde van Vlaanderen Beloften
3rd Paris–Roubaix Espoirs
1986
3rd GP Odiel Lambrechts
5th Circuit des Frontières
8th Grote Prijs Jef Scherens
1987
3rd De Kustpijl
9th Grote Prijs Jef Scherens
1988
8th GP Stad Zottegem
1989
6th GP de la Ville de Rennes
1990
2nd Schaal Sels
10th GP de la Ville de Rennes

=== Grand Tour result ===
Grand Tour	1986
Vuelta a España	DNF
Giro d'Italia	–
Tour de France	–
