= Eduardo González =

Eduardo González may refer to:

- Eduardo González (politician) (born 1969), member of the Florida House of Representatives
- Eduardo Gonzalez (archer) (born 1984), Venezuelan compound archer
- Eduardo González (swimmer) (born 1974), Puerto Rican swimmer
- Chato González (born 1944), Spanish footballer and manager
- Eduardo González Valiño (1911–1979), Spanish footballer
- Eduardo González Salvador (born 1960), Spanish racing cyclist
