= 1988 Critérium du Dauphiné Libéré =

Race details
- Dates: 31 May – 5 June 1988
- Stages: 6
- Distance: 1,020.1 km (633.9 mi)
- Winning time: 28h 46' 27"

Results
Jersey awarded to the overall winner	Winner	Luis Herrera (COL)	(Café de Colombia)
	Second	Niki Rüttimann (SUI)	(Weinmann–La Suisse–SMM Uster)
	Third	Charly Mottet (FRA)	(Système U–Gitane)
Jersey awarded to the points classification winner	Points	Acácio da Silva (POR)	(Kas–Canal 10)
Jersey awarded to the mountains classification winner	Mountains	Mariano Sánchez (ESP)	(Teka)
	Combination	Charly Mottet (FRA)	(Système U–Gitane)
Jersey awarded to the sprints classification winner	Sprints	Luc Leblanc (FRA)	(Toshiba–Look)
	Team	Kas–Canal 10	

The 1988 Critérium du Dauphiné Libéré was the 40th edition of the cycle race and was held from 31 May to 5 June 1988. The race started in Avignon and finished in Saint-Pierre-de-Chartreuse. The race was won by Luis Herrera of the Café de Colombia team.

== Teams ==
Fourteen teams, containing a total of 125 riders, participated in the race:

- Système U–Gitane
- Fagor–MBK
- Toshiba–Look
- Z–Peugeot
- RMO–Cycles Méral–Mavic
- Hitachi–Bosal–B.C.E. Snooker
- Superconfex–Yoko–Opel–Colnago
- Kas–Canal 10
- Teka
- Carrera Jeans–Vagabond
- Café de Colombia
- Weinmann–La Suisse–SMM Uster
- France amateur team
- Colombia amateur team

== Route ==
Stage characteristics and winners
Stage	Date	Course	Distance	Type	Winner
1a	31 May	Avignon to Aubenas	108 km (67 mi)		Niki Rüttimann (SUI)
1b	31 May	Aubenas to Romans	93.2 km (57.9 mi)		Steve Bauer (CAN)
2	1 June	Romans to Lyon	181.4 km (112.7 mi)		Christophe Manin (FRA)
3	2 June	Bourgoin to Annecy	178.5 km (110.9 mi)		Charly Mottet (FRA)
4	3 June	La Roche-sur-Foron to Chambéry	195.8 km (121.7 mi)		Acácio da Silva (POR)
5	4 June	Chambéry to Le Fontanil	154 km (96 mi)		Niki Rüttimann (SUI)
6a	5 June	Le Fontanil to Grenoble	82.5 km (51.3 mi)		Frans Maassen (NED)
6b	5 June	Grenoble to Grenoble	26.7 km (16.6 mi)	Individual time trial	Luis Herrera (COL)

== General classification ==
Final general classification

Rank	Rider	Team	Time
1	Luis Herrera (COL)	Café de Colombia	28h 46' 27"
2	Niki Rüttimann (SUI)	Weinmann–La Suisse–SMM Uster	+ 2' 07"
3	Charly Mottet (FRA)	Système U–Gitane	+ 2' 51"
4	Luc Leblanc (FRA)	Toshiba–Look	+ 3' 54"
5	Mariano Sánchez (ESP)	Teka	+ 4' 05"
6	Acácio da Silva (POR)	Kas–Canal 10	+ 4' 33"
7	Éric Caritoux (FRA)	Kas–Canal 10	+ 5' 16"
8	Gilles Sanders (FRA)	Kas–Canal 10	+ 6' 51"
9	Yvon Madiot (FRA)	Toshiba–Look	+ 6' 52"
10	Pascal Simon (FRA)	Système U–Gitane	+ 8' 05"
