= 1984 Clásica de San Sebastián =

Race details
- Dates: 16 August 1984
- Stages: 1
- Distance: 244 km (151.6 mi)
- Winning time: 6h 11' 10"

Results
	Winner	Niki Rüttimann (SUI)
	Second	Reimund Dietzen (FRG)
	Third	Celestino Prieto (ESP)

The 1984 Clásica de San Sebastián was the fourth edition of the Clásica de San Sebastián cycle race and was held on 16 August 1984. The race started and finished in San Sebastián. The race was won by Niki Rüttimann.

== General classification ==
Final general classification

Rank	Rider	Time
1	Niki Rüttimann (SUI)	6h 11' 10"
2	Reimund Dietzen (FRG)	+ 0"
3	Celestino Prieto (ESP)	+ 0"
4	Dominique Garde (FRA)	+ 0"
5	José Recio (ESP)	+ 0"
6	Iñaki Gastón (ESP)	+ 0"
7	Ángel Camarillo (ESP)	+ 0"
8	Eduardo Chozas (ESP)	+ 0"
9	Robert Millar (GBR)	+ 0"
10	Faustino Rupérez (ESP)	+ 0"
