= La Côte Picarde =

French one-day road cycling race

Race details
- Date: April
- Region: Picardy
- Discipline: Road race
- Competition: UCI Europe Tour
- Type: Single day race

History
- First edition: 1986
- Editions: 30
- Final edition: 2015
- First winner: Dan Frost (DEN)
- Most wins: No repeat winners
- Final winner: Simone Consonni (ITA)

La Côte Picarde was a professional cycling race held between 1986 and 2015 in Picardy, France. It was held as part of the UCI Europe Tour from 2005 onwards, in category 1.ncup, meaning it was part of the UCI Under 23 Nations' Cup.

== Winners ==
Year	Country	Rider	Team
1986	Denmark	Dan Frost	
1987	United States	Greg Oravetz	
1988	France	Philippe Lauraire	
1989	France	Jean-Louis Conan	
1990	Poland	Sławomir Krawczyk	
1991	Poland	Marek Swiniarski	
1992	France	Jean-Philippe Dojwa	
1993	Belgium	Peter Verbeken	
1994	France	Laurent Roux	
1995	France	Thierry Marie	
1996	France	Philippe Gaumont	
1997	Uzbekistan	Djamolidine Abdoujaparov	
1998	Italy	Mauro Zinetti	
1999	France	Pascal Chanteur	
2000	Belgium	Johan Coenen	
2001	Kazakhstan	Andrey Kashechkin	Domo–Farm Frites–Latexco
2002	France	Sébastien Chavanel	Vendée U
2003	France	Mathieu Claude	Vendée U
2004	France	Saïd Haddou	CC Nogent-sur-Oise
2005	France	Jean-Marc Marino	UC Châteauroux
2006	France	Guillaume Levarlet	CC Nogent-sur-Oise
2007	Slovenia	Simon Špilak	Slovenia (national team)
2008	Slovenia	Kristijan Koren	Slovenia (national team)
2009	Russia	Timofey Kritsky	Russia (national team)
2010	Russia	Vyacheslav Kuznetsov	Russia (national team)
2011	France	Arnaud Démare	France (national team)
2012	Norway	Vegard Breen	Norway (national team)
2013	Australia	Caleb Ewan	Australia (national team)
2014	Belgium	Jens Wallays	Belgium (national team)
2015	Italy	Simone Consonni	Italy (national team)
