= 1982 Grote Prijs Jef Scherens =

Race details
- Dates: 19 September 1982
- Stages: 1
- Distance: 214 km (133.0 mi)
- Winning time: 5h 15' 00"

Results
	Winner	Rudy Matthijs (BEL)
	Second	Alfons De Wolf (BEL)
	Third	Ludwig Wijnants (BEL)

The 1982 Grote Prijs Jef Scherens was the 18th edition of the Grote Prijs Jef Scherens cycle race and was held on 19 September 1982. The race started and finished in Leuven. The race was won by Rudy Matthijs.

== General classification ==
Final general classification

Rank	Rider	Time
1	Rudy Matthijs (BEL)	5h 15' 00"
2	Alfons De Wolf (BEL)	+ 2' 00"
3	Ludwig Wijnants (BEL)	+ 2' 00"
4	Roger De Cnijf (BEL)	+ 2' 00"
5	Werner Devos (BEL)	+ 4' 20"
6	Jan Bogaert (BEL)	+ 4' 20"
7	Dirk Heirweg (BEL)	+ 4' 20"
8	Jan Wijnants (BEL)	+ 4' 20"
9	Rudy Pevenage (BEL)	+ 4' 20"
10	Jean-Philippe Vandenbrande (BEL)	+ 4' 20"
