= Jens Wallays =

Belgian cyclist (born 1992)

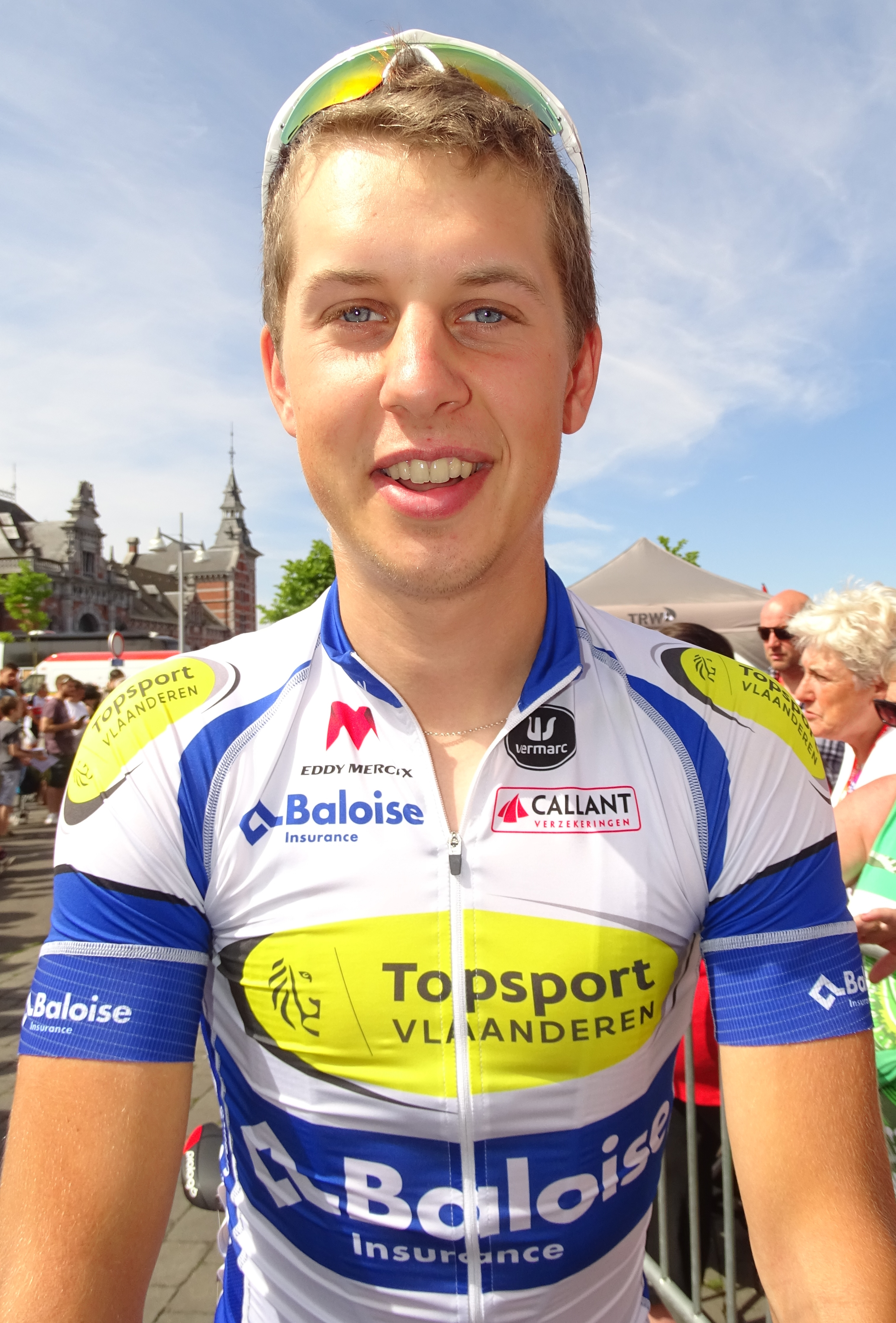
- Wallays in 2015

Personal information
- Full name: Jens Wallays
- Born: 15 September 1992 (age 34)

Cycling career
- Sport: Cycling
- Current team: Retired
- Discipline: Road
- Role: Rider

Amateur team
- 2011–2014: EFC–Quick-Step

Professional team
- 2015–2017: Topsport Vlaanderen–Baloise

Jens Wallays (born 15 September 1992) is a Belgian former professional racing cyclist, who rode professionally for Sport Vlaanderen–Baloise between 2015 and 2017. He is the brother and nephew of racing cyclists Jelle Wallays and Luc Wallays, the latter of whom coached Jelle and Jens.

== Major results ==
2013
1st Road race, National Under–23 Road Championships
2014
1st La Côte Picarde
2015
8th Dwars door de Vlaamse Ardennen
