= 1986 Grote Prijs Jef Scherens =

Race details
- Dates: 22 January 2010
- Stages: 1
- Distance: 232 km (144.2 mi)
- Winning time: 6h 30' 00"

Results
| | Winner | Jozef Lieckens (BEL) |
| | Second | Johan Capiot (BEL) |
| | Third | Luc De Decker (BEL) |

The 1986 Grote Prijs Jef Scherens was the 22nd edition of the Grote Prijs Jef Scherens cycle race and was held on 22 January 2010. The race started and finished in Leuven. The race was won by Jozef Lieckens.

== General classification ==
Final general classification

| Rank | Rider | Time |
|---|---|---|
| 1 | Jozef Lieckens (BEL) | 6h 30' 00" |
| 2 | Johan Capiot (BEL) | + 0" |
| 3 | Luc De Decker (BEL) | + 0" |
| 4 | Frank Verleyen (BEL) | + 0" |
| 5 | Dirk Demol (BEL) | + 0" |
| 6 | Jan Bogaert (BEL) | + 0" |
| 7 | Brian Holm (DEN) | + 0" |
| 8 | Bruno Geuens (BEL) | + 0" |
| 9 | Luc Desmet (BEL) | + 0" |
| 10 | Dirk Clarysse (BEL) | + 0" |
