= 1984 Dwars door België =

Race details
- Dates: 22 March 1984
- Stages: 1
- Distance: 240 km (149.1 mi)
- Winning time: 6h 08' 00"

Results
	Winner	Walter Planckaert (BEL)
	Second	Rudy Matthijs (BEL)
	Third	Marc Sergeant (BEL)

The 1984 Dwars door België was the 39th edition of the Dwars door Vlaanderen cycle race and was held on 22 March 1984. The race started and finished in Waregem. The race was won by Walter Planckaert.

== General classification ==
Final general classification

Rank	Rider	Time
1	Walter Planckaert (BEL)	6h 08' 00"
2	Rudy Matthijs (BEL)	+ 0"
3	Marc Sergeant (BEL)	+ 0"
4	Jan van Houwelingen (NED)	+ 2' 00"
5	Eric Stevens (BEL)	+ 2' 00"
6	Eric Vanderaerden (BEL)	+ 2' 50"
7	Leo van Vliet (NED)	+ 2' 50"
8	Dirk Demol (BEL)	+ 2' 50"
9	Bert Wekema (NED)	+ 2' 50"
10	Jan Wijnants (BEL)	+ 2' 50"
