= 1983 Brabantse Pijl =

Race details
- Dates: 27 March 1983
- Stages: 1
- Distance: 166 km (103.1 mi)
- Winning time: 4h 00' 00"

Results
	Winner	Eddy Planckaert (BEL)
	Second	Rudy Matthijs (BEL)
	Third	Alfons De Wolf (BEL)

The 1983 Brabantse Pijl was the 23rd edition of the Brabantse Pijl cycle race and was held on 27 March 1983. The race started in Sint-Genesius-Rode and finished in Alsemberg. The race was won by Eddy Planckaert.

== General classification ==
Final general classification

Rank	Rider	Time
1	Eddy Planckaert (BEL)	4h 00' 00"
2	Rudy Matthijs (BEL)	+ 15"
3	Alfons De Wolf (BEL)	+ 22"
4	Ludo Peeters (BEL)	+ 22"
5	Johan van der Velde (NED)	+ 1' 32"
6	Patrick Versluys (BEL)	+ 1' 48"
7	Acácio da Silva (POR)	+ 1' 48"
8	Roger De Cnijf (BEL)	+ 2' 30"
9	Luc Colijn (BEL)	+ 3' 13"
10	Ludo De Keulenaer (BEL)	+ 3' 13"
