= 1985 GP Ouest-France =

Race details
- Dates: 27 August 1985
- Stages: 1
- Distance: 225 km (139.8 mi)
- Winning time: 5h 43' 48"

Results
	Winner	Éric Guyot (FRA)	(Skil–Sem–Kas–Miko)
	Second	Rudy Matthijs (BEL)	(Hitachi–Splendor–Sunair)
	Third	Marc Madiot (FRA)	(Renault–Elf)

The 1985 GP Ouest-France was the 49th edition of the GP Ouest-France cycle race and was held on 27 August 1985. The race started and finished in Plouay. The race was won by Éric Guyot of the Skil team.

== General classification ==
Final general classification

Rank	Rider	Team	Time
1	Éric Guyot (FRA)	Skil–Sem–Kas–Miko	5h 43' 48"
2	Rudy Matthijs (BEL)	Hitachi–Splendor–Sunair	+ 0"
3	Marc Madiot (FRA)	Renault–Elf	+ 0"
4	Philippe Leleu (FRA)	La Vie Claire	+ 0"
5	Thierry Marie (FRA)	Renault–Elf	+ 7"
6	Gilbert Duclos-Lassalle (FRA)	Peugeot–Shell–Michelin	+ 9"
7	Christophe Lavainne (FRA)	Renault–Elf	+ 9"
8	Jörg Müller (SUI)	Skil–Sem–Kas–Miko	+ 9"
9	Dominique Garde (FRA)	Skil–Sem–Kas–Miko	+ 9"
10	Guy Gallopin (FRA)	Skil–Sem–Kas–Miko	+ 9"
