= Dirk Demol =

Belgian cyclist

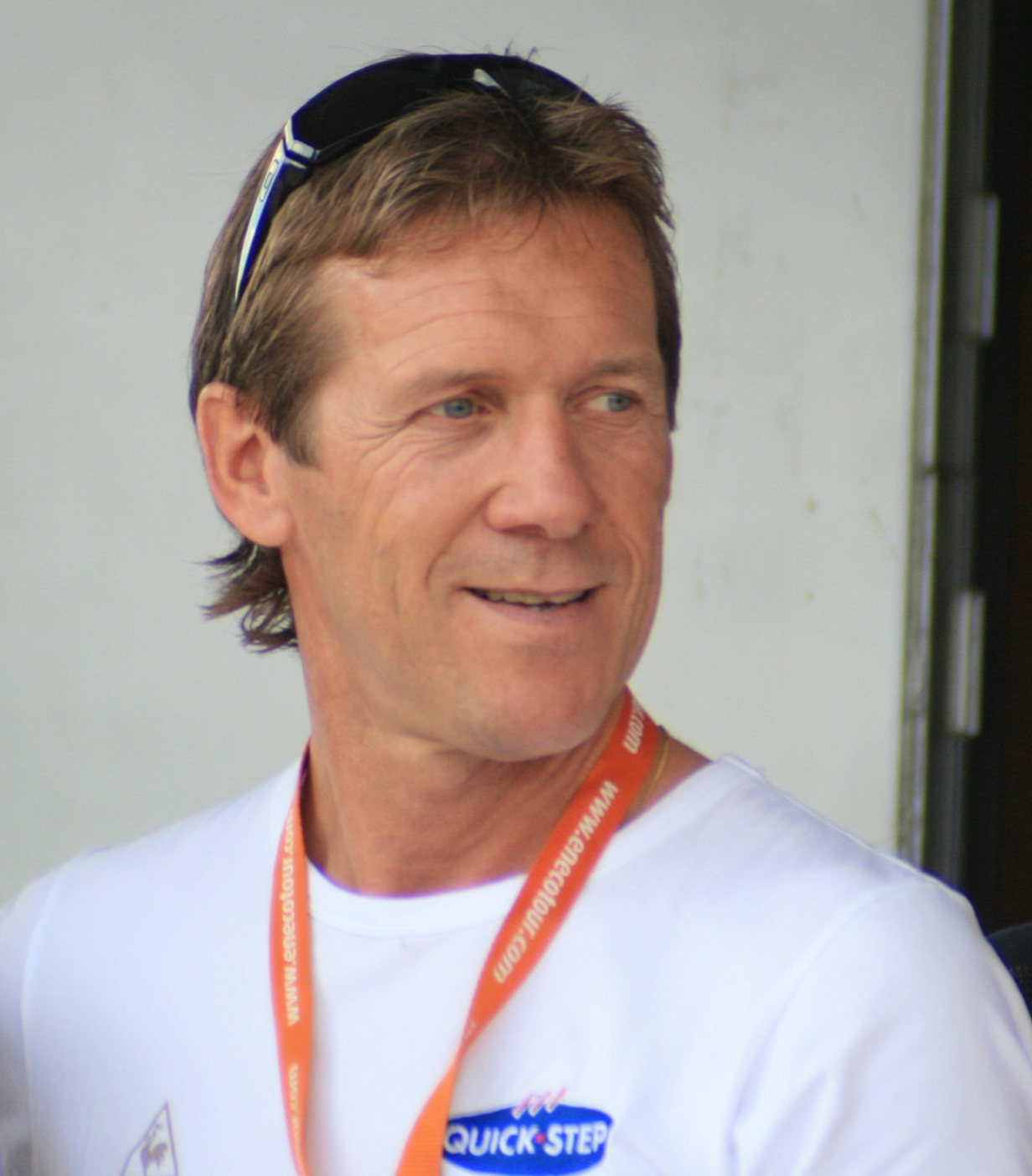
- Demol in 2008

Personal information
- Full name: Dirk Demol
- Born: 4 November 1959 (age 66) Kuurne, Belgium
- Height: 1.83 m (6 ft 0 in)
- Weight: 72 kg (159 lb)

Cycling career
- Sport: Cycling
- Current team: NSN Cycling Team
- Discipline: Road
- Role: Rider; Directeur sportif

Professional teams
- 1982–1983: DAF Trucks–TeVe Blad
- 1984: Splendor–Jacky Aernoudt Meubelen
- 1985: Verandalux–Dries
- 1986: Fangio–Lois–Mavic
- 1987–1988: AD Renting–Fangio–IOC–MBK
- 1989–1992: Lotto–Vlaanderen–Jong–Mbk–Merckx
- 1993: GB–MG Maglificio
- 1994–1995: Palmans–Inco Coating

Managerial teams
- 2000–2007: U.S. Postal Service
- 2008: Quick-Step
- 2009: Astana
- 2010–2011: Team RadioShack
- 2012–2018: RadioShack–Nissan
- 2019: Team Katusha–Alpecin
- 2020–2023: Israel Start-Up Nation
- 2024: Lotto–Dstny

Major wins
- One-day races and Classics Paris–Roubaix (1988)

Dirk Demol (born 4 November 1959) is a Belgian former professional racing cyclist and a cycling team manager. He is currently assistant sports director of Lotto–Intermarché.

As a rider he specialized in the spring classics, his best result being his victory in the 1988 edition of the one-day classic Paris–Roubaix for Team ADR.

== Racing career ==
Demol grew up in Kuurne, Belgium. In 1987 he finished third at Kuurne-Brussel-Kuurne. In 1988 he won Paris-Roubaix for Belgian pro team ADR. He retired from racing in 1995.

== Management career ==
In 2000, Demol became assistant team manager for the U.S. Postal Service Pro Cycling Team, a position he held until 2007. He then worked as team manager for Quick Step (2008), assistant team manager for Astana (2009), and assistant team manager for Team RadioShack (2010–2011). From 2012 to 2018 he was assistant sport director for various teams including Radioshack-Nissan, RadioShack Leopard, Trek Factory Racing, and Trek-Segafredo. At the end of the 2018 season he left Trek-Segafredo and became the head sports director at Team Katusha-Alpecin for the 2019 season. He joined the Israel Cycling Academy as the assistant sports director in 2020, and assumed the same position at Lotto–Dstny in 2024.

== Major results ==
1979
1st Stage 1 Grand Prix Guillaume Tell
3rd Ronde Van Vlaanderen Beloften
1980
2nd Paris–Roubaix Espoirs
1982
7th Kuurne–Brussels–Kuurne
1983
4th Grote Prijs Jef Scherens
9th Kampioenschap van Vlaanderen
9th Druivenkoers Overijse
1984
3rd Omloop van het Houtland
7th GP Stad Zottegem
8th Dwars door België
10th Grand Prix de Fourmies
1985
2nd Druivenkoers Overijse
3rd GP Impanis
9th De Kustpijl
10th Kuurne–Brussels–Kuurne
1986
2nd Omloop van het Houtland
5th Grote Prijs Jef Scherens
7th Scheldeprijs
7th De Kustpijl
1987
2nd Kampioenschap van Vlaanderen
3rd Kuurne–Brussels–Kuurne
9th Road race, National Road Championships
1988
1st Paris–Roubaix
3rd Grand Prix de Fourmies
1989
5th Kampioenschap van Vlaanderen
1990
3rd Kampioenschap van Vlaanderen
6th Kuurne–Brussels–Kuurne
1993
4th Nokere Koerse

=== Grand Tour general classification results timeline ===
Grand Tour	1985	1986	1987	1988
Vuelta a España	—	DNF	—	—
Giro d'Italia	—	—	—	—
Tour de France	DNF	—	—	149

Legend
—	Did not compete
DNF	Did not finish
