= Rogelio Arango =

Colombian cyclist

Personal information
- Born: 27 June 1959 (age 67) Tenerife, Valle del Cauca, Colombia

Cycling career
- Sport: Cycling
- Role: Rider

Rogelio Arango (born 17 May 1959) is a Colombian former professional racing cyclist. He rode in the 1985 Tour de France. He also competed in the individual road race at the 1984 Summer Olympics.
