= Jan Baeyens =

Belgian cyclist

Personal information
- Born: 16 June 1957 (age 69) Ninove, Belgium

Cycling career
- Sport: Cycling
- Role: Rider

Jan Baeyens (born 16 June 1957) is a Belgian former professional racing cyclist. He rode in the 1985 Tour de France.
