= Aloïs Wouters =

Belgian cyclist

Personal information
- Born: 17 August 1962 (age 64) Mol, Belgium

Cycling career
- Sport: Cycling
- Role: Rider

Aloïs Wouters (born 17 August 1962) is a Belgian former professional racing cyclist. He rode in the 1985 Tour de France.
