= Roberto Bressan =

Italian cyclist

Personal information
- Born: 5 May 1960 (age 66)

Cycling career
- Sport: Cycling
- Role: Rider

Roberto Bressan (born 5 May 1960) is an Italian former professional racing cyclist. He rode in the 1985 Tour de France.
