= Claudio Cerri =

Italian cyclist

Personal information
- Born: 6 September 1960 (age 66) Lomello, Italy

Cycling career
- Sport: Cycling
- Role: Rider

Claudio Cerri (born 9 June 1960) is an Italian former professional racing cyclist. He rode in the 1985 Tour de France.
