= Veerle =

Veerle is a (mainly) Flemish and Dutch female given name, derived from Pharaildis or Pharailde, itself formed from Old Norse fara, "to travel", and hildr, "battle", meaning traveling (female) warrior. People so named include:

- Veerle Baetens (born 1978), Belgian actress and singer
- Veerle Casteleyn (born 1978), Belgian musical theatre performer and ballerina
- Veerle Dejaeghere (born 1973), Belgian runner
- Veerle Ingels (born 1981), Belgian racing cyclist
- Veerle Keppens, Belgian and American physicist
- Veerle Wouters (born 1974), Belgian politician
