= Patrick Toelen =

Belgian cyclist

Personal information
- Born: 17 December 1962 (age 63) Geel, Belgium

Cycling career
- Sport: Cycling
- Role: Rider

Patrick Toelen (born 17 December 1962) is a Belgian former professional racing cyclist. He rode in the 1985 Tour de France. Toelen rode for the teams Hitachi Sunair - Splendor and Hitachi Marc.
