= Michel Bibollet =

French cyclist

Personal information
- Born: 24 March 1963 (age 63) Sallanches, France

Cycling career
- Sport: Cycling
- Role: Rider

Michel Bibollet (born 24 March 1963) is a French former professional racing cyclist. He rode in two editions of the Tour de France.
