= Jacques van Meer =

Dutch cyclist

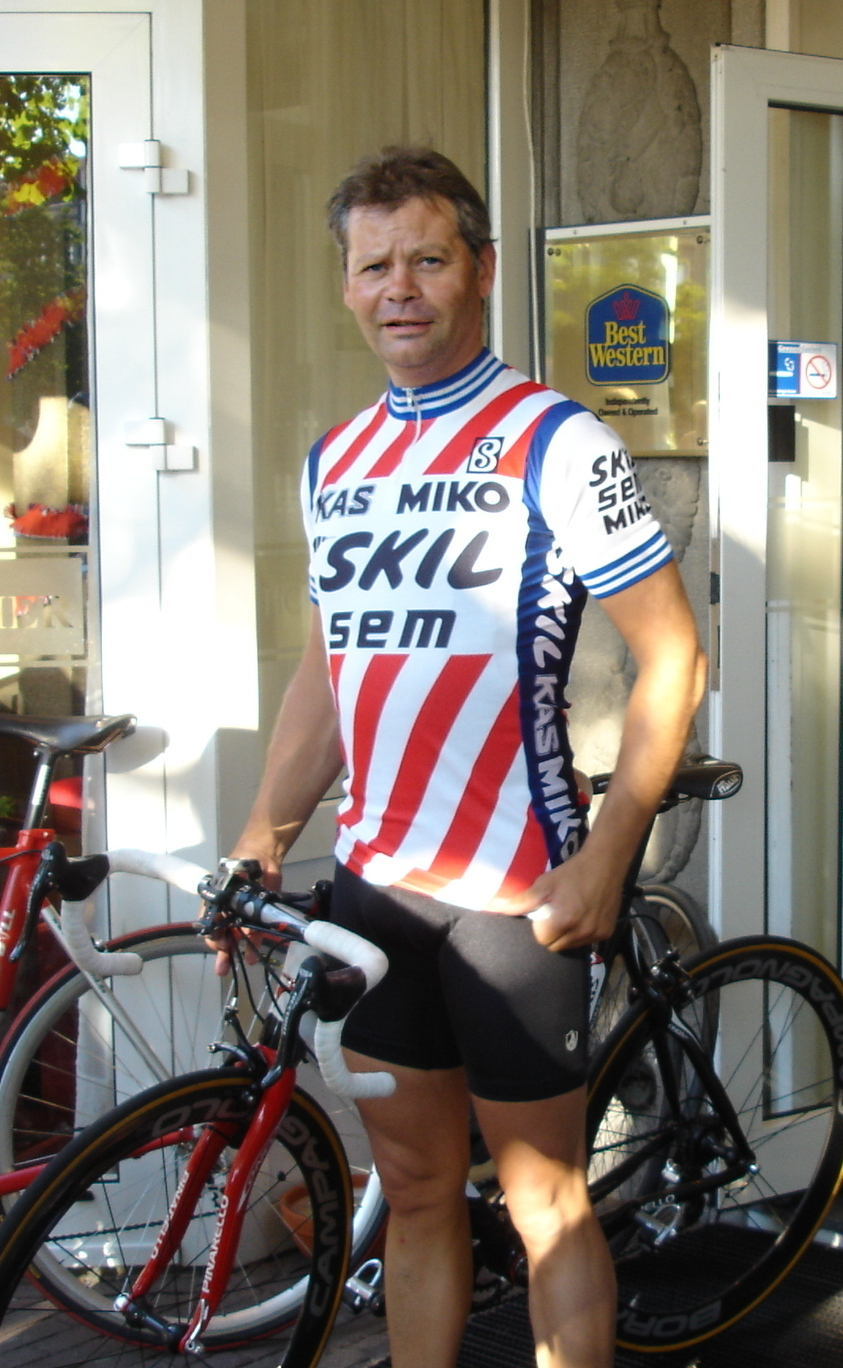
- Jacques van Meer in 2007

Personal information
- Born: 18 May 1958 (age 68) Wouw, Netherlands
- Height: 1.72 m (5 ft 8 in)
- Weight: 63 kg (139 lb)

Jacobus "Jacques" van Meer (born 18 May 1958) is a retired cyclist from the Netherlands. As amateur, he won the Ronde van Limburg (Netherlands) and Omloop der Kempen in 1979. Next year he won a national title in the road race in 1980 and competed in this event at the 1980 Summer Olympics, finishing in 33rd place. After the Games he turned professional and competed through the 1980s. His best achievement in UCI World Tour races was 28th place in Vuelta a España in 1981. In 1983, he won Le Samyn and finished second in Paris–Camembert, both rated as 1.1 races.

== See also ==
- List of Dutch Olympic cyclists
