= Manrico Ronchiato =

Italian cyclist

Personal information
- Full name: Manrico Ronchiato
- Born: 28 October 1960 (age 65) Jesolo, Italy

Cycling career
- Sport: Cycling
- Role: Rider

Manrico Ronchiato (born 28 October 1960) is a former Italian racing cyclist. He finished in last place in the 1985 Tour de France.
