= Luc Wallays =

Belgian cyclist

Personal information
- Born: 7 August 1961 Roeselare, Belgium
- Died: 5 March 2013 (aged 51) Roeselare, Belgium

Cycling career
- Sport: Cycling
- Discipline: Road
- Role: Rider

Professional teams
- 1985: Tönissteiner–TW Rock–BASF
- 1986: Fangio–Lois–Mavic
- 1987–1988: AD Renting–Fangio–IOC–MBK

Luc Wallays (7 August 1961 – 5 March 2013) was a Belgian professional racing cyclist.

Wallays turned professional in 1984, after winning the Giro della Valle d'Aosta the previous year. He rode in the 1985 Tour de France. However his career was cut short due to a bacterial illness he contracted whilst in Chile. Wallays subsequently became a physiotherapist, and remained heavily involved in cycle racing: he coached his nephews, racing cyclists Jelle and Jens Wallays, served as sporting manager at Jonge Renners Roeselare cycling club, and was elite sport coordinator with the Flanders Cycling Federation from 2008 until his death. He was afflicted with cancer for the last six years of his life, overcoming the disease twice before succumbing to the illness in March 2013.

== Major results ==
1982
3rd Overall Giro della Valle d'Aosta
1983
1st Overall Giro della Valle d'Aosta
1984
4th Le Samyn
8th Nationale Sluitingprijs
8th Omloop van het Houtland
1985
5th GP Stad Zottegem
8th Grand Prix Cerami
