= Stefan Morjean =

Belgian cyclist

Personal information
- Born: 17 March 1960 (age 66) Zwevegem, Belgium

Cycling career
- Sport: Cycling
- Role: Rider

Stefan Morjean (born 17 March 1960) is a Belgian former professional racing cyclist. He rode in four editions of the Tour de France.
