= José del Ramo Núñez =

Spanish cyclist

Personal information
- Born: 28 May 1960 (age 66) Ontur, Spain

Cycling career
- Sport: Cycling
- Role: Rider

José del Ramo Núñez (born 28 May 1960) is a Spanish former professional racing cyclist. He rode in the 1985 Tour de France. After his career he founded the bike helmet company Catlike in Yecla.
