= Régis Simon =

French cyclist

Personal information
- Full name: Régis Simon
- Born: 19 March 1958 (age 68) Troyes, France

Cycling career
- Sport: Cycling
- Current team: Retired
- Discipline: Road
- Role: Rider

Major wins
- 1 stage Tour de France 1985

Régis Simon (born 19 March 1958, in Troyes) is a French former professional road bicycle racer. He is the brother of former professional cyclists Pascal, Jérôme and François Simon. Régis Simon won a stage in the 1985 Tour de France.

== Major results ==
1985
Le Horps
Tour de France:

Winner stage 18B

1987
Dixmont
1990
Circuit de Lorraine
