= Alain Vigneron =

French cyclist

Personal information
- Born: 1 September 1954 (age 72) La Broque, France

Cycling career
- Sport: Cycling
- Role: Rider

Alain Vigneron (born 1 September 1954) is a former French racing cyclist. He rode in ten Grand Tours between 1980 and 1986.
