= Guy Gallopin =

French cyclist

Personal information
- Born: 23 January 1956 (age 70) Mondonville-Saint-Jean, France

Cycling career
- Sport: Cycling
- Current team: Retired
- Discipline: Road
- Role: Rider

Professional teams
- 1981–1982: Sem–France Loire–Campagnolo
- 1983: La Redoute–Motobécane
- 1984–1985: Skil–Reydel–Sem–Mavic
- 1986: Kas
- 1987: ANC–Halfords

Guy Gallopin (born 23 January 1956) is a French former professional racing cyclist. He rode in five editions of the Tour de France and three editions of the Vuelta a España. His brothers Alain and Joël and his nephew Tony were also professional cyclists.

== Major results ==
1981
1st Paris–Camembert
1984
1st Stage 2 Critérium du Dauphiné Libéré
4th Bordeaux–Paris
1985
1st Stage 2 Tour du Vaucluse
3rd Bordeaux–Paris
4th Overall Tour du Limousin
10th GP Ouest–France
1986
2nd Bordeaux–Paris
3rd Châteauroux Classic
1987
3rd Bordeaux–Paris
