= André Lurquin =

Belgian cyclist

Personal information
- Born: 27 August 1961 (age 65) Doornik, Belgium

Cycling career
- Sport: Cycling
- Role: Rider

André Lurquin (born 27 August 1961) is a Belgian former professional racing cyclist. He rode in two editions of the Tour de France.
