= Ludwig Wijnants =

Belgian cyclist

Personal information
- Full name: Ludwig Wijnants
- Born: 4 July 1956 (age 70) Veerle, Belgium

Cycling career
- Sport: Cycling
- Discipline: Road
- Role: Rider

Major wins
- 7 stage 1985 Tour de France

Ludwig Wijnants (born 4 July 1956, in Veerle) was a Belgian professional road bicycle racer.

== Major results ==
1979
Harelbeke - Poperinge - Harelbeke
Zwijndrecht
1980
Putte-Mechelen
1981
Budingen
GP Frans Verbeeck
Ronde van Limburg
1982
Omloop Leiedal
1983
Booischot
1984
Ninove
1985
Tour de France:

Winner stage 7

Herselt
1986
Herk-de-Stad
Houtem
Onze-Lieve-Vrouw Waver
1987
Putte-Mechelen
1991
Grand Prix Adri van der Poel
