= Niki Rüttimann =

Swiss cyclist (born 1962)

Personal information
- Full name: Niki Rüttimann
- Born: 18 August 1962 (age 64) Untereggen, Switzerland

Cycling career
- Sport: Cycling
- Current team: Retired
- Discipline: Road
- Role: Rider

Professional teams
- 1984–1987: La Vie Claire
- 1988–1990: Weinmann–La Suisse–SMM Uster

Major wins
- Clásica de San Sebastián (1984); Tour de France, 1 stage
Medal record
Men's road bicycle racing
Representing Switzerland
World Championships
Silver medal – second place	1983 Altenrhein	Amateur's Road Race

Niki Rüttimann (born 18 August 1962 in Untereggen) is a Swiss former road bicycle racer. Ruttiman was one of the most important domestiques of the La Vie Claire teams of the mid 1980s. In the 1984 Tour de France he finished 11th overall riding in support of Bernard Hinault who placed 2nd. During the 1985 Tour de France as well as the 1986 Tour de France he was right there between Hinault and Greg LeMond as they battled for Tour victories both years. He finished 13th in 1985 and 7th in 1986 while also winning stage 14. In 1987 he won a stage in the Tour de Romandie and a stage in the Critérium du Dauphiné and went into the Tour supporting Jean-François Bernard being as Hinault had retired and LeMond was recovering from a gunshot wound. Bernard held the yellow jersey late in the race and finished 3rd overall as Ruttiman was there until the end, but abandoned on the final stage in the high mountains. He won two stages and finished 2nd overall in the 1988 Critérium du Dauphiné Libéré.

== Major results ==
1979
1st Road race, National Junior Road Championships
1980
1st Overall Grand Prix Rüebliland
1982
1st Overall GP Tell

1st Stages 2 & 3

1983
1st Stage 6 Coors Classic
3rd Schynberg Rundfahrt
1984
1st Clásica de San Sebastián
3rd Overall Tour de Romandie
4th Subida a Arrate
5th Overall Critérium du Dauphiné Libéré
1985
1st Overall Paris–Bourges
2nd Overall Tour de Suisse
5th Overall Tour de Romandie
9th Overall Tirreno–Adriatico
1986
1st Overall Étoile de Bessèges
1st Overall Route du Sud
7th Overall Tour de France

1st Stage 14

7th Overall Critérium International
9th Overall Giro d'Italia
10th Giro di Lombardia
1987
1st Stage 4 Critérium du Dauphiné Libéré
1st Stage 1 Tour de Romandie
1988
2nd Overall Critérium du Dauphiné Libéré

1st Stages 1a & 5

2nd Boucles Parisiennes
4th Wartenberg Rundfahrt
10th Overall Tour de Suisse
1989
1st Annemasse-Bellegarde et retour
2nd Road race, National Road Championships
3rd Tour du Nord-Ouest
6th Wartenberg Rundfahrt
1990
7th Tour of Flanders

=== Grand Tour general classification results timeline ===
Grand Tour	1984	1985	1986	1987	1988	1989	1990
Giro d'Italia	—	—	9	—	—	—	—
Tour de France	11	13	7	DNF	43	DNF	DNF
Vuelta a España	—	—	—	—	—	—	—
