= Philippe Lauraire =

French cyclist

Personal information
- Born: 14 July 1961 (age 65) Sartrouville, France

Cycling career
- Sport: Cycling
- Role: Rider

Philippe Lauraire (born 14 July 1961) is a French former professional racing cyclist. He rode in the 1985 Tour de France.
