= Rudy Matthijs =

Belgian cyclist

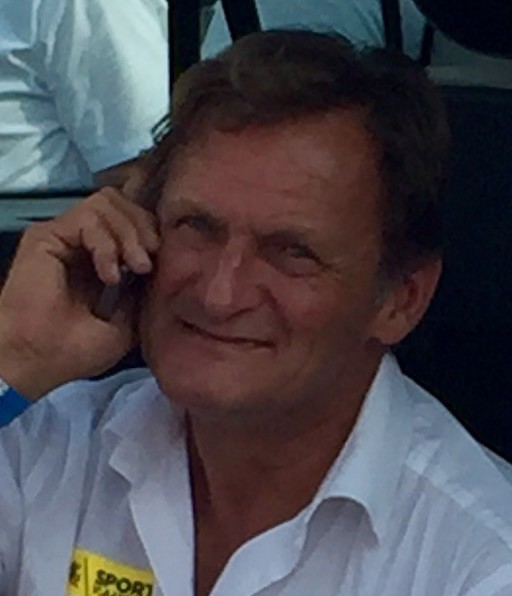

Personal information
- Full name: Rudy Matthijs
- Born: 3 March 1959 (age 67) Eeklo, Belgium

Cycling career
- Sport: Cycling
- Current team: Retired
- Discipline: Road
- Role: Rider
- Rider type: Sprinter

Professional teams
- 1981: Fangio–Sapeco–Mavic
- 1982–1983: Boule d'Or–Sunair
- 1984–1988: Splendor–Jacky Aernoudt Meubelen

Major wins
- 4 stages Tour de France (1983, 1985)

Rudy Matthijs (born 3 March 1959, in Eeklo) is a Belgian retired professional road bicycle racer. He won 4 stages in the Tour de France, 3 of which came during the 1985 Tour de France on stages 1 and 2, and then on the final stage of the tour with one of the biggest sprinter's stages in all of cycling on the Champs Elysees.

== Major results ==
1981
1st Omloop Schelde-Durme
1st Stage 5 Vuelta a Aragón
2nd Omloop van de Vlaamse Scheldeboorden
3rd Polder–Kempen
1982
1st Grand Prix de Fourmies
1st Grote Prijs Jef Scherens
2nd Omloop van het Leiedal
3rd Nokere Koerse
1983
1st Ronde van Limburg
1st Leeuwse Pijl
1st Stage 3 Tour de France
1st Stage 2 Tour de Luxembourg
2nd Brabantse Pijl
7th Overall Three Days of De Panne
7th Dwars door België
9th Omloop Het Volk
1984
1st Kampioenschap van Vlaanderen
1st Stages 2 & 4 Tour de Luxembourg
1st Stage 5a (ITT) Four Days of Dunkirk
2nd Dwars door België
5th Tour of Flanders
9th GP Stad Zottegem
10th Paris–Roubaix
1985
Tour de France

1st Stages 1, 2 & 22

1st Stage 7 Tour de Suisse
1st Stage 6 Vuelta a Aragón
2nd GP Ouest–France
2nd Leeuwse Pijl
3rd Overall Four Days of Dunkirk

1st Stages 1 & 3

3rd Overall Tour of Belgium
8th Kuurne–Brussels–Kuurne
