= Eduardo González Salvador =

Spanish cyclist (born 1960)

Personal information
- Born: 1 May 1960 (age 66) Bilbao, Spain

Cycling career
- Sport: Cycling
- Role: Rider

Eduardo González Salvador (born 1 May 1960) is a Spanish former professional racing cyclist. He rode in the 1985 Tour de France.
