= Eric McKenzie (cyclist) =

New Zealand cyclist

Personal information
- Born: 28 August 1958 (age 68) Kawerau, New Zealand

Cycling career
- Sport: Cycling
- Role: Rider

Professional teams
- 1982: Capri Sonne - Campagnolo - Merckx
- 1983: Euro Shop - Splendor
- 1984: Kelme
- 1985-1986: Lotto

Eric McKenzie (born 28 August 1958) is a New Zealand former professional racing cyclist. He won the 1979 Tour of Southland and rode in four editions of the Tour de France (1982, 1983, 1984 and 1985). In the 1982 Tour de France he finished fifth in two stages and in 1983 Tour de France achieved stage finishes of third and fourth.

== Major results ==
Results:

1979
1st Overall Tour of Southland
4th Overall Dulux Six Day
1982
3rd GP Union Dortmund
3rd Tour du Nord-Ouest
4th Omloop van West-Brabant
7th Overall Setmana-Catalana
10th Trofeo Laigueglia
1983
4th Omloop van het Houtland Lichtervelde
5th Gran Piemonte
6th [Circuit des Frontières
6th GP Frans Melckenbeek
10th Kuurne–Brussels–Kuurne
1984
7th Clasica de Sabinanigo
1985
3rd Leeuwse Pijl
4th Grote Prijs Jef Scherens
7th Grote Prijs Marcel Kint
1986
2nd GP Benego
3rd Overall Tour de Picardie
3rd Meiprijs - Ereprijs Victor de Bruyne
5th Binche–Chimay–Binche
