= Francis Castaing =

French cyclist

Personal information
- Full name: Francis Castaing
- Born: 22 April 1959 (age 67) Bordeaux, France

Cycling career
- Sport: Cycling
- Discipline: Road
- Role: Rider
- Rider type: Sprinter

Professional team
- Peugeot

Major wins
- 1 stage 1985 Tour de France; Paris–Bourges (1981)

Francis Castaing (born 22 April 1959) is a French former professional road bicycle racer. He won one stage in the 1985 Tour de France. He also competed in the individual road race event at the 1980 Summer Olympics.

== Major results ==
1979
Tour de Gironde
1980
Bordeaux - Saintes
1981
(France) French National Track Championships
Paris–Bourges
1982
GP de Peymeinade
GP Ouest-France
France National Track Points race Championship
1984
Brest
Quilan
1985
Breuillet
Lanester
Rodez
Tour de France:

Winner stage 6

Castillon-la-Bataille
1986
Ronde d'Aix-en-Provence
Tour de Vendée
1987
Bordeaux
