= Pascal Simon =

French cyclist

Personal information
- Full name: Pascal Simon
- Born: 27 December 1956 (age 69) France

Cycling career
- Sport: Cycling
- Current team: Retired
- Discipline: Road
- Role: Rider

Professional teams
- 1979–1987: Peugeot
- 1988: Système U
- 1989: Super U
- 1990–1991: Castorama

Major wins
- Tour de l'Avenir; Seven days in yellow jersey

Pascal Simon (born 27 September 1956) is a retired French road racing cyclist. A native of Mesnil St. Loup, he was a professional cyclist from 1979 to 1991. Pascal was the oldest of four brothers that all became professional cyclists: Régis, Jerôme and François.

In 1983, Simon obtained the yellow jersey while riding for Cycles Peugeot after the tenth stage of the Tour de France. One day later, Simon fell down and broke his shoulder. Simon continued for six more days, before the injury forced him out of the race.

== Major results ==
1979
Montauroux
1980
Tour du Haut Var
1981
Tour de l'Avenir
1983
Boucles de Sospel
Dauphiné Libéré: Stage 6
Lisieux
1984
Route du Sud
Joigny
1986
Tour du Haut Var
1988
Châteauroux - Limoges

== Tour de France ==
- 1980 - 28th
- 1982 - 20th, winner of 15th stage
- 1983 - did not finish, 7 days in yellow jersey
- 1984 - 7th
- 1985 - 20th
- 1986 - 13th
- 1987 - 53rd
- 1988 - 17th
- 1989 - 13th
- 1990 - 35th
- 1991 - 57th
