= Tönissteiner (cycling team) =

Team information
- Registered: Belgium
- Founded: 1984
- Disbanded: 1985
- Discipline: Road

Team name history
- 1984 1985: Tönissteiner–Lotto–Mavic; Tönissteiner–TW Rock–BASF
Tönissteiner jersey
Jersey

Tönissteiner was a Belgian professional cycling team that existed in 1984 and 1985. The team participated in the 1985 Tour de France.
