= Verandalux–Dries =

Team information
- Registered: Belgium
- Founded: 1984
- Disbanded: 1985
- Discipline: Road

Team name history
- 1984 1985 1985 (Tour de France): Dries–Verandalux; Verandalux–Dries; Verandalux–Dries–Nissan
Verandalux–Dries jersey
Jersey

Verandalux–Dries was a Belgian professional cycling team that existed in 1984 and 1985. The team participated in the 1985 Tour de France.

The 1985 Team Directeur Sportif were Roger Swerts and Eddy Stoop. Rossin Bikes was also a co-sponsor and supplied the team bicycles for the 1985 season.
