= Celestino Prieto =

Spanish cyclist

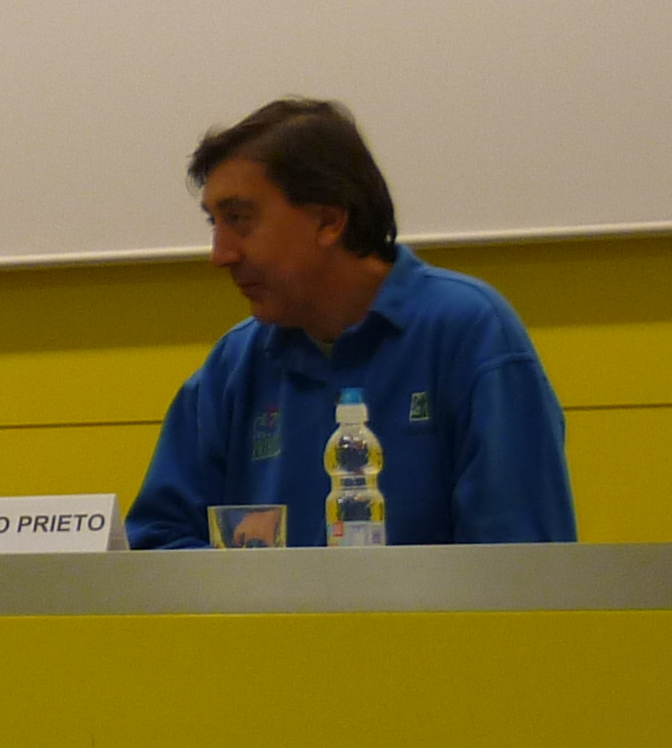

Personal information
- Born: 29 January 1961 (age 65) Barcelona, Spain

Cycling career
- Sport: Cycling
- Role: Rider

Celestino Prieto (born 29 January 1961) is a Spanish former professional racing cyclist. He rode in six editions of the Tour de France and six editions of the Vuelta a España.
