= Grote Prijs Raymond Impanis =

Belgian road cycling race

Race details
- Region: Flemish Region
- English name: Grand Prix Raymond Impanis
- Discipline: Road
- Type: One-day race

History
- First edition: 1982
- Editions: 13
- Final edition: 1994
- First winner: Willem Peeters (BEL)
- Most wins: Wiebren Veenstra (NED) (2 wins)
- Final winner: Carlo Bomans (BEL)

The Grote Prijs Raymond Impanis was a one-day road cycling race held annually in Belgium from 1982 until 1994. The race took place between Kampenhout and Sint-Niklaas in the Flemish Region of Belgium.

== Winners ==
Year	Winner	Second	Third
1982	(Belgium) Willem Peeters	(Belgium) Guido Van Sweevelt	(Netherlands) Aad van den Hoek
1983	(Belgium) Ludo Peeters	(Netherlands) Henri Manders	(Belgium) Patrick Versluys
1984	(Netherlands) Ad Wijnands	(Netherlands) Teun van Vliet	(Belgium) Etienne De Wilde
1985	(Netherlands) Jelle Nijdam	(Belgium) Jos Lieckens	(Belgium) Dirk Demol
1986	(Australia) Allan Peiper	(Belgium) Willem Wijnant	(Belgium) Yves Godimus
1987	(Belgium) Paul Haghedooren	(Belgium) Ludo Giesberts	(Belgium) Geert Wandewalle
1988	(Australia) Stephen Hodge	(Belgium) Johan Museeuw	(Netherlands) Stefan Rakers
1989	(Belgium) Eric Vanderaerden	(Belgium) Etienne De Wilde	(Belgium) Carlo Bomans
1990	(Netherlands) Wiebren Veenstra	(East Germany) Uwe Raab	(Canada) Steve Bauer
1991	(Netherlands) Wiebren Veenstra	(Belgium) Johan Capiot	(Netherlands) Michel Cornelisse
1992	(Netherlands) Louis de Koning	(Belgium) Herman Frison	(Belgium) Danny Van Looy
1993	(Australia) Phil Anderson	(Russia) Viatcheslav Ekimov	(Netherlands) Rob Harmeling
1994	(Belgium) Carlo Bomans	(Belgium) Johan Museeuw	(Netherlands) Adrie van der Poel
