= 1990 Brabantse Pijl =

Race details
- Dates: 25 March 1990
- Stages: 1
- Distance: 190 km (118.1 mi)
- Winning time: 4h 38' 40"

Results
	Winner	Frans Maassen (NED)
	Second	Johan Capiot (BEL)
	Third	Noel Segers (BEL)

The 1990 Brabantse Pijl was the 30th edition of the Brabantse Pijl cycle race and was held on 25 March 1990. The race started in Sint-Genesius-Rode and finished in Alsemberg. The race was won by Frans Maassen.

== General classification ==
Final general classification

Rank	Rider	Time
1	Frans Maassen (NED)	4h 38' 40"
2	Johan Capiot (BEL)	+ 2' 39"
3	Noël Segers (BEL)	+ 2' 39"
4	Herman Frison (BEL)	+ 2' 39"
5	Paul Haghedooren (BEL)	+ 2' 39"
6	Johan Lammerts (NED)	+ 2' 58"
7	Edwig Van Hooydonck (BEL)	+ 3' 31"
8	Jean-Philippe Vandenbrande (BEL)	+ 3' 31"
9	Brian Holm (DEN)	+ 3' 31"
10	Carlo Bomans (BEL)	+ 3' 54"
