= Adri van der Poel =

Dutch cyclist (born 1959)

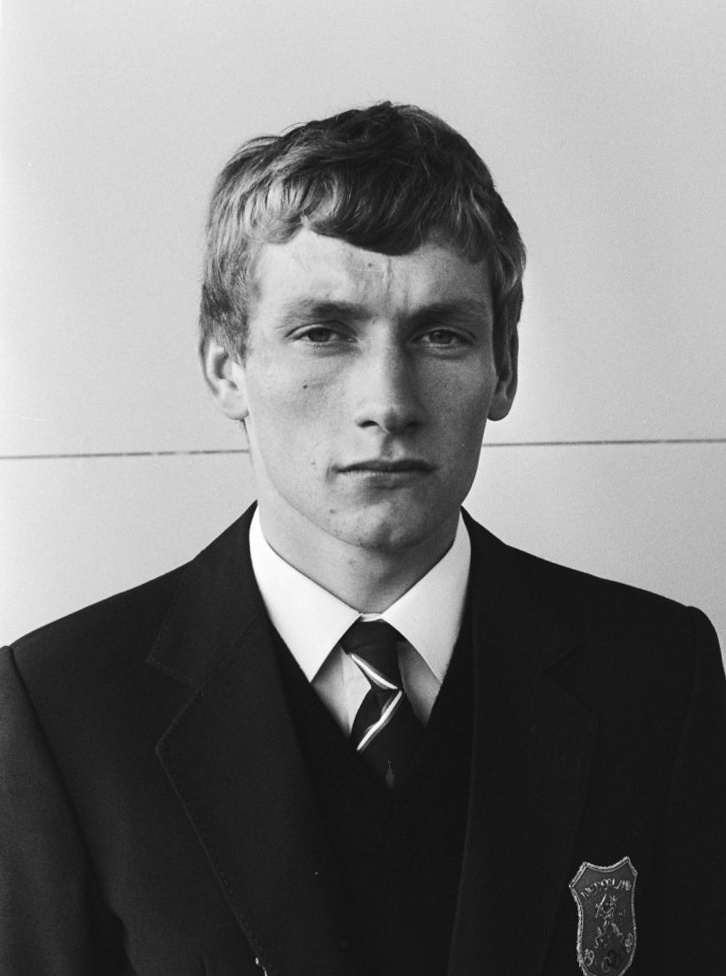
- Van der Poel in 1980

Personal information
- Full name: Adri van der Poel
- Born: 17 June 1959 (age 67) Bergen op Zoom, Netherlands
- Height: 1.81 m (5 ft 11 in)
- Weight: 70 kg (154 lb)

Cycling career
- Sport: Cycling
- Current team: Retired
- Disciplines: Road; Cyclo-cross
- Role: Rider

Professional team
- 1981–1983: DAF Trucks–Côte d'Or
- 1984–1986: Kwantum–Decosol–Yoko
- 1987–1988: PDM–Ultima–Concorde
- 1989–1990: Domex–Weinmann
- 1991–1992: Tulip Computers
- 1993: Mercatone Uno–Zucchini–Medeghini
- 1994–1995: Collstrop–Willy Naessens
- 1996–2000: Rabobank

Major wins
- Cyclo-cross World Championships (1996) National Championships (1989, 1990, 1991, 1992, 1995, 1999) World Cup (1996–97) Superprestige (1996–97) Road Grand Tours Tour de France 2 individual stages (1987, 1988) One-Day Races and Classics National Road Race Championships (1987) Tour of Flanders (1986) Liège–Bastogne–Liège (1988) Brabantse Pijl (1985) Clásica de San Sebastián (1985) Paris–Tours (1987) Amstel Gold Race (1990)
Medal record
Representing Netherlands
Men's road bicycle racing
World Championships
Silver medal – second place	1983 Altenrhein	Road Race
Men's cyclo-cross
World Championships
Gold medal – first place	1996 Montreuil	Elite
Silver medal – second place	1985 Munich	Elite
Silver medal – second place	1988 Hägendorf	Elite
Silver medal – second place	1989 Pontchâteau	Elite
Silver medal – second place	1990 Getxo	Elite
Silver medal – second place	1991 Gieten	Elite
Bronze medal – third place	1992 Leeds	Elite
Bronze medal – third place	1999 Poprad	Elite

Adri van der Poel (born 17 June 1959) is a retired Dutch cyclist. Van der Poel was a professional from 1981 to 2000. His biggest wins included six classics, two stages of the Tour de France and the World Cyclo-Cross Championships in 1996. He also obtained the second place and silver medal in the World Road Championships in 1983 behind Greg LeMond and five second places in the World Cyclo-Cross championships. The Grand Prix Adrie van der Poel is named after him.

== Career ==
Van der Poel began his career on the road and during his first season as a professional he obtained second place overall at Paris–Nice behind Stephen Roche and at one-day race La Flèche Wallonne. In the Tour de France, he won two stages; his stage win in 1988 set the record for fastest stage (since then only surpassed by three cyclists). Van der Poel also competed in cyclo-cross during the winter and obtained great results – he turned to cyclo-cross full time in the latter part of his career, winning the World Championships in 1996, and the World Cup and Superprestige classifications in 1997. He retired aged 40 after the inaugural edition of the Grand Prix Adrie Van der Poel in 2000, organised to commemorate him in his home village of Hoogerheide. Van der Poel finished third in his own race, which was won by his teammate Richard Groenendaal, and it's been a tentpole of the calendar ever since.

In 1983 he tested positive for strychnine. He said that his father-in-law had served a pigeon pie for Sunday lunch, and only when he tested positive did he realise that the pigeons had been doped with strychnine.

== Family ==
Van der Poel is the son-in-law of the famous French cyclist Raymond Poulidor. His sons David and Mathieu are also cyclists. Mathieu van der Poel became cyclo-cross world champion himself in the junior race in 2012 (Koksijde) and 2013 (Louisville, Kentucky) and then matching his father's title in 2015 (Tábor, Czech Republic), and exceeding his father, winning titles in 2019, 2020, 2021, 2023, 2024 and 2025. Mathieu is prolific also in professional road cycling, having won the UCI Road World Championships – Men's road race in 2023, along with the wins at Tour of Flanders in 2020, 2022 and 2024, Strade Bianche in 2021, Milan-Sanremo in 2023 and 2025, and Paris-Roubaix in 2023, 2024 and 2025.

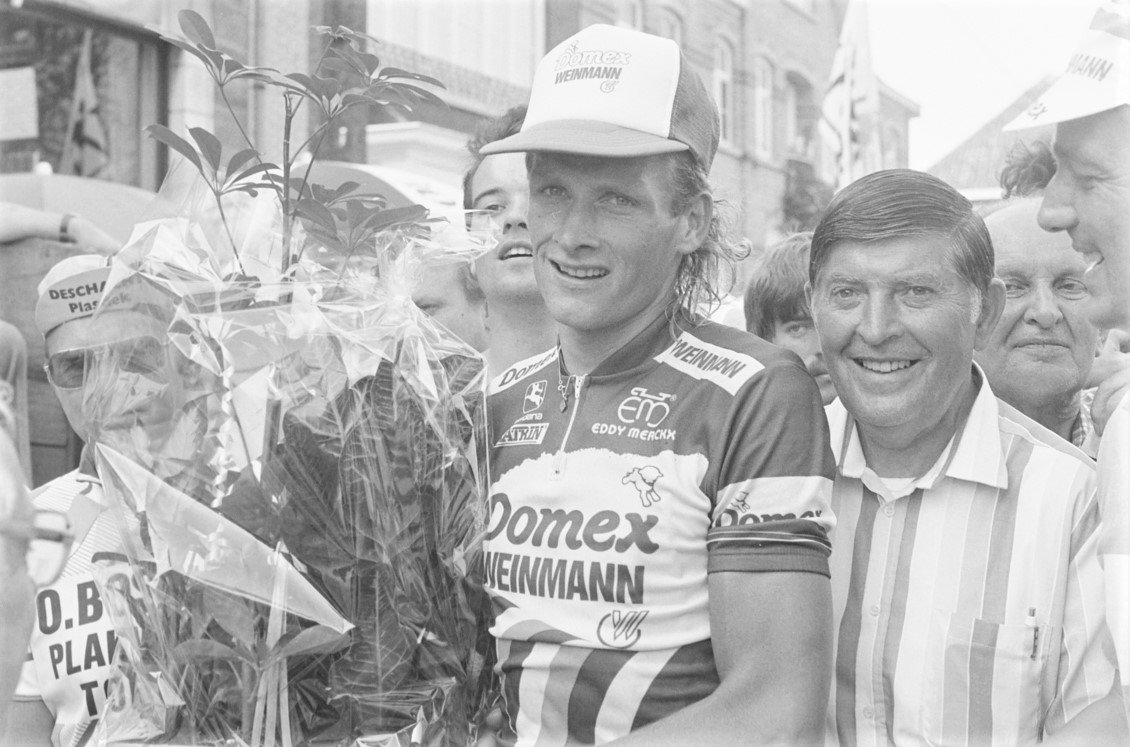
Van der Poel after winning the Grote Prijs Raf Jonckheere 1989 in Westrozebeke.

Van der Poel's brother Jacques was also a professional cyclist from 1986 to 1992.

== Major results ==
=== Cyclo-cross ===
1983–1984
Superprestige

1st Zürich-Waid

1984–1985
2nd UCI World Championships
Superprestige

3rd Gavere

1986–1987
1st National Championships
1987–1988
2nd UCI World Championships
1988–1989
1st National Championships
2nd UCI World Championships
Superprestige

2nd Wetzikon

1989–1990
1st National Championships
2nd UCI World Championships
1990–1991
1st National Championships
Superprestige

1st Gavere
2nd Gieten

2nd UCI World Championships
1991–1992
1st National Championships
Superprestige

2nd Gavere

3rd UCI World Championships
1992–1993
Superprestige

1st Valkenswaard
3rd Roma

1993–1994
1st National Championships
UCI World Cup

2nd Loenhout
3rd Igorre

Superprestige

2nd Overijse

1994–1995
3rd Overall Superprestige

1st Overijse
1st Diegem
2nd Harnes
3rd Wetzikon

1995–1996
1st UCI World Championships
UCI World Cup

1st Pontchâteau

3rd Overall Superprestige

1st Sint Michielsgestel
2nd Wetzikon
3rd Diegem
3rd Harnes

1st Surhuisterveen
1st Vossem
1996–1997
1st Overall UCI World Cup

1st Praha
1st Koksijde

1st Overall Superprestige

1st Gieten
1st Milan
1st Sint Michielsgestel
1st Harnes

1st Woerden
1st Kalmthout
1st Nommay
1st Essen
1st Loenhout
1st Haegendorf
1997–1998
2nd Overall Superprestige

1st Diegem
1st Wetzikon
2nd Gieten
2nd Overijse
2nd Harnes
3rd Silvelle
3rd Milano

2nd Overall UCI World Cup

2nd Eschenbach
2nd Praha
2nd Koksijde
2nd Heerlen
3rd Pontchâteau

1st Harderwijk
1st Niel
1st Rijkevorsel
1st Zeddam
1st Loenhout
1st Surhuisterveen
1998–1999
1st National Championships
UCI World Cup

1st Nommay
3rd Koksijde

3rd Overall Superprestige

1st Harnes
2nd Wetzikon
3rd Silvelle
3rd Diegem

1st Pijnacker
1st Montevrain
3rd UCI World Championships
1999–2000
1st Harderwijk
1st Lutterbach
Gazet van Antwerpen

2nd Essen

3rd Overall Superprestige

2nd Overijse
2nd Diegem
3rd Ruddervoorde
3rd Surhuisterveen
3rd Heerlen

2nd National Championships
UCI World Cup

3rd Leudelange
3rd Kalmthout

=== Road ===
1980
7th Road race, Olympic Games
9th Overall Étoile des Espoirs
1981
1st Stage 1 Critérium du Dauphiné Libéré
2nd Overall Paris–Nice

1st Stage 3

2nd La Flèche Wallonne
2nd Le Samyn
3rd Road race, National Championships
4th Scheldeprijs
6th Overall Critérium International
6th Gent–Wevelgem
6th Grand Prix de Fourmies
6th Ronde van Limburg
10th Rund um den Henninger Turm
1982
1st Züri-Metzgete
1st Stage 4 Paris–Nice
2nd Grand Prix of Aargau Canton
2nd GP Union Dortmund
4th Overall Ronde van Nederland
5th Circuit des Frontières
8th Amstel Gold Race
1983
1st Grote Prijs Jef Scherens
1st Nationale Sluitingsprijs
1st Prologue Tour de Luxembourg
2nd Road race, UCI World Championships
2nd Paris–Tours
2nd Kampioenschap van Vlaanderen
2nd Trofeo Baracchi (with Hennie Kuiper)
3rd Road race, National Championships
3rd Giro di Lombardia
3rd GP Union Dortmund
4th Overall Grand Prix du Midi Libre
4th Gent–Wevelgem
4th Paris–Brussels
4th Trofeo Laigueglia
~~4th Rund um den Henninger Turm~~
6th Paris–Roubaix
6th Grand Prix de Cannes
7th Liège–Bastogne–Liège
7th Omloop Het Volk
8th Overall Paris–Nice
9th Overall Three Days of De Panne
1984
4th Overall Tirreno–Adriatico

1st Points classification
1st Stage 4

4th Grote Prijs Jef Scherens
6th Giro di Lombardia
6th Paris–Brussels
6th Grand Prix Impanis
Tour de France

Held after Stage 4

1985
1st Brabantse Pijl
1st Clásica de San Sebastián
1st Paris–Brussels
1st Scheldeprijs
1st Binche-Tournai-Binche
1st Grand Prix d'Isbergues
1st Grand Prix de Cannes
Tour de Luxembourg

1st Stages 1 & 4

2nd Overall Nissan Classic

1st Stage 5

2nd Giro di Lombardia
3rd Overall Three Days of De Panne
4th Overall Ronde van Nederland
5th Omloop Het Volk
6th Paris–Tours
7th Nationale Sluitingsprijs
7th Critérium des As
9th Paris–Roubaix
10th Overall Grand Prix du Midi Libre
Tour de France

Held after Stages 4–8

1986
1st Tour of Flanders
1st Nationale Sluitingsprijs
2nd Liège–Bastogne–Liège
2nd Dwars door België
2nd Critérium des As
3rd Paris–Roubaix
3rd Züri-Metzgete
4th Paris–Tours
5th Rund um den Henninger Turm
6th Overall Nissan Classic
6th Overall Three Days of De Panne
6th Amstel Gold Race
6th Giro del Lazio
7th Milan–San Remo
7th Tour du Haut Var
7th Nice–Alassio
8th Grand Prix de Fourmies
10th Gent–Wevelgem
1987
1st Road race, National Championships
1st Paris–Tours
1st Giro del Piemonte
1st Druivenkoers Overijse
1st Grand Prix des Fourmies
1st Grand Prix of Aargau Canton
1st Nationale Sluitingsprijs
1st Stage 9 Tour de France
3rd Overall Ronde van Nederland
4th Critérium des As
5th Overall Nissan Classic
7th Overall Tour of Sweden

1st Stage 1 & 2

8th Tour of Flanders
8th Trofeo Baracchi (with Steven Rooks)
9th Amstel Gold Race
9th Clásica de San Sebastián
9th Brabantse Pijl
1988
1st Overall Étoile de Bessèges
1st Overall Herald Sun Tour

1st Stage 7b

1st Liège–Bastogne–Liège
1st Stage 16 Tour de France
2nd Road race, National Championships
3rd Tour of Flanders
3rd Grand Prix La Marseillaise
4th Overall Vuelta a Andalucía

1st Stage 5

4th Overall Nissan Classic
5th Grand Prix Impanis
6th Giro dell'Etna
6th Grand Prix of Aargau Canton
6th Giro del Lazio
6th Grand Prix Eddy Merckx
7th Milan–San Remo
7th Brabantse Pijl
7th Züri-Metzgete
8th Overall Tour de Luxembourg
8th Overall Three Days of De Panne
8th Druivenkoers Overijse
1989
1st Stage 6 Paris–Nice
1st Stage 5 Tour Méditerranéen
2nd Brabantse Pijl
2nd E3 Prijs Vlaanderen
3rd Omloop van de Drie Zustersteden
4th Omloop van de Vlaamse Scheldeboorden
6th Scheldeprijs
6th Veenendaal–Veenendaal
8th Binche-Tournai-Binche
10th Amstel Gold Race
1990
1st Amstel Gold Race
1st Grand Prix of Aargau Canton
1st Omloop van de Vlaamse Scheldeboorden
2nd Dwars door België
2nd Omloop Mandel-Leie-Schelde
3rd E3 Prijs Vlaanderen
4th Giro dell'Etna
5th Overall Three Days of De Panne
5th Scheldeprijs
5th Paris–Brussels
5th Tour de Berne
6th Milano–Torino
6th Coppa Bernocchi
6th Giro del Piemonte
6th Grand Prix de Fourmies
7th Omloop Het Volk
7th Veenendaal–Veenendaal
8th Paris–Roubaix
10th GP Ouest-France
10th Grand Prix de Lune
1991
1st Circuito de Getxo
1st Stage 4 Ronde van Nederland
2nd Clásica de Sabiñánigo
3rd Overall Vuelta a Andalucía
3rd Overall Tour de Luxembourg

1st Points classification

4th Overall Nissan Classic
4th Paris–Tours
4th Grand Prix de Fourmies
4th Grand Prix d'Isbergues
5th Road race, National Championships
5th Trofeo Luis Puig
5th US Pro Championship
7th Dwars door België
8th Milano–Torino
8th Grand Prix des Amériques
10th Overall Kellogg's Tour

1st Stage 5

1992
1st Points classification, Nissan Classic
2nd Overall Kellogg's Tour
2nd De Kustpijl
3rd Ronde van Midden-Zeeland
5th Circuito de Getxo
6th Kampioenschap van Vlaanderen
7th Dwars door België
9th Züri-Metzgete
1993
4th Veenendaal–Veenendaal
5th Paris–Roubaix
5th Paris–Tours
5th GP Industria & Artigianato di Larciano
6th Amstel Gold Race
7th Kampioenschap van Vlaanderen
1994
1st Profronde van Heerlen
2nd Nationale Sluitingsprijs
3rd Druivenkoers Overijse
3rd Grand Prix Impanis
4th De Kustpijl
5th Paris–Tours
7th Paris–Brussels
9th Cholet-Pays de la Loire
10th Grand Prix de Fourmies
1995
5th Omloop van het Houtland
7th Brabantse Pijl
8th Nokere Koerse
10th Grand Prix de Denain
1996
7th Ronde van Midden-Zeeland
10th Nationale Sluitingsprijs
1997
4th Nationale Sluitingsprijs
1998
9th De Kustpijl
1999
1st Grote Prijs Marcel Kint

=== Grand Tour general classification results timeline ===
Grand Tour	1981	1982	1983	1984	1985	1986	1987	1988	1989	1990	1991	1992	1993	1994	1995	1996	1997	1998	1999	2000
/ Vuelta a España	—	—	—	—	—	—	—	—	—	—	71	—	—	—	—	—	—	—	—	—
Giro d'Italia	—	—	—	—	—	—	—	—	—	—	—	—	100	—	—	—	—	—	—	—
Tour de France	—	102	37	DNF	51	110	105	84	DNF	111	—	DNF	—	—	—	—	—	—	—	—

=== Classics results timeline ===
Monuments results timeline
Monument	1981	1982	1983	1984	1985	1986	1987	1988	1989	1990	1991	1992	1993	1994	1995	1996	1997	1998	1999	2000
Milan–San Remo	—	61	31	50	18	7	46	7	31	—	74	42	91	—	—	—	—	—	—	—
Tour of Flanders	14	33	34	—	15	1	8	3	35	64	68	26	46	26	58	60	—	—	—	—
Paris–Roubaix	—	32	6	—	9	3	37	18	18	8	25	14	5	16	48	—	—	—	—	—
Liège–Bastogne–Liège	24	25	7	—	40	2	46	1	—	53	48	—	80	—	—	—	—	—	—	—
Giro di Lombardia	—	44	3	6	2	—	—	—	—	32	11	—	—	—	—	—	—	—	—	—

=== Major championship results timeline ===
	1981	1982	1983	1984	1985	1986	1987	1988	1989	1990	1991	1992	1993	1994	1995	1996	1997	1998	1999	2000
World Championships	DNF	—	2	DNF	59	67	18	49	DNF	DNF	DNF	DNF	14	DNF	—	—	—	—	—	—
National Championships	3	18	3	11	—	10	1	2	—	—	5	—	8	11	—	—	—	20	—	—

Legend
—	Did not compete
DNF	Did not finish

== See also ==
- List of Dutch Olympic cyclists
- List of doping cases in cycling
- List of Dutch cyclists who have led the Tour de France general classification

Sporting positions
Preceded by Jos Lammertink	Dutch National Road Race Champion; 1987	Succeeded by Peter Pieters
