= 1993 Brabantse Pijl =

Race details
- Dates: 28 March 1993
- Stages: 1
- Distance: 185 km (115.0 mi)
- Winning time: 4h 29' 25"

Results
| | Winner | Edwig Van Hooydonck (BEL) |
| | Second | Franco Ballerini (ITA) |
| | Third | Andrei Tchmil (BEL) |

The 1993 Brabantse Pijl was the 33rd edition of the Brabantse Pijl cycle race and was held on 28 March 1993. The race started and finished in Alsemberg. The race was won by Edwig Van Hooydonck.

== General classification ==
Final general classification

| Rank | Rider | Time |
|---|---|---|
| 1 | Edwig Van Hooydonck (BEL) | 4h 29' 25" |
| 2 | Franco Ballerini (ITA) | + 0" |
| 3 | Andrei Tchmil (MDA) | + 0" |
| 4 | Steven Rooks (NED) | + 9" |
| 5 | Frans Maassen (NED) | + 1' 00" |
| 7 | Serge Baguet (BEL) | + 1' 24" |
| 8 | Marc Bouillon (BEL) | + 1' 24" |
| 9 | Bo Hamburger (DEN) | + 1' 24" |
| 10 | Johan Capiot (BEL) | + 1' 24" |
| 11 | François Simon (FRA) | + 1' 30" |
