= 1984 Ronde van Nederland =

Dutch cycling race

These are the results for the 24th edition of the Ronde van Nederland cycling race, which was held from August 21 to August 25, 1984. The race started in Breda (North Brabant) and finished in Assen (Drenthe).

== Final classification ==
RANK	NAME CYCLIST	TEAM	TIME
1.	Johan Lammerts (NED)		22:18:21
2.	Jos Lammertink (NED)		+ 0.08
3.	Gert-Jan Theunisse (NED)		+ 0.50
4.	Peter Pieters (NED)		+ 1.11
5.	Teun van Vliet (NED)		+ 1.20
6.	Henri Manders (NED)		+ 2.10
7.	Greg LeMond (USA)		+ 2.13
8.	Rudi Dexters (BEL)		+ 2.18
9.	Paul Haghedooren (BEL)		+ 2.19
10.	Johnny Broers (NED)		+ 2.22
