= 1987 Brabantse Pijl =

Race details
- Dates: 29 March 1987
- Stages: 1
- Distance: 227 km (141.1 mi)
- Winning time: 5h 54' 00"

Results
	Winner	Edwig Van Hooydonck (BEL)
	Second	Peter Harings (NED)
	Third	Jean-Marie Wampers (BEL)

The 1987 Brabantse Pijl was the 27th edition of the Brabantse Pijl cycle race and was held on 29 March 1987. The race started in Sint-Genesius-Rode and finished in Alsemberg. The race was won by Edwig Van Hooydonck.

== General classification ==
Final general classification

Rank	Rider	Time
1	Edwig Van Hooydonck (BEL)	5h 54' 00"
2	Peter Harings (NED)	+ 1' 05"
3	Jean-Marie Wampers (BEL)	+ 1' 11"
4	Patrick Onnockx (BEL)	+ 1' 18"
5	Noël Segers (BEL)	+ 1' 27"
6	Herman Frison (BEL)	+ 1' 27"
7	Jean-Philippe Vandenbrande (BEL)	+ 1' 27"
8	Peter Winnen (NED)	+ 1' 27"
9	Adri van der Poel (NED)	+ 1' 27"
10	Etienne De Wilde (BEL)	+ 1' 27"
