= 1992 Omloop Het Volk =

Race details
- Dates: 29 February 1992
- Stages: 1
- Distance: 208 km (129 mi)
- Winning time: 5h 01' 00"

Results
	Winner	Johan Capiot (BEL)
	Second	Peter Pieters (NED)
	Third	Eric Vanderaerden (BEL)

The 1992 Omloop Het Volk was the 46th edition of the Omloop Het Volk cycle race and was held on 29 February 1992. The race started and finished in Ghent. The race was won by Johan Capiot.

== General classification ==
Final general classification
Rank	Rider	Time
1	Johan Capiot (BEL)	5h 01' 00"
2	Peter Pieters (NED)	+ 0"
3	Eric Vanderaerden (BEL)	+ 0"
4	Olaf Ludwig (GER)	+ 0"
5	Fabio Baldato (ITA)	+ 0"
6	Alain Van Den Bossche (BEL)	+ 0"
7	Wilfried Nelissen (BEL)	+ 0"
8	Michel Zanoli (NED)	+ 0"
9	Jelle Nijdam (NED)	+ 0"
10	Benny Van Brabant (BEL)	+ 0"
