= 1989 Brabantse Pijl =

Race details
- Dates: 26 March 1989
- Stages: 1
- Distance: 194 km (120.5 mi)
- Winning time: 4h 44' 00"

Results
| | Winner | Johan Capiot (BEL) |
| | Second | Adri van der Poel (NED) |
| | Third | Dirk De Wolf (BEL) |

The 1989 Brabantse Pijl was the 29th edition of the Brabantse Pijl cycle race and was held on 26 March 1989. The race started in Sint-Genesius-Rode and finished in Alsemberg. The race was won by Johan Capiot.

== General classification ==
Final general classification

| Rank | Rider | Time |
|---|---|---|
| 1 | Johan Capiot (BEL) | 4h 44' 00" |
| 2 | Adri van der Poel (NED) | + 0" |
| 3 | Dirk De Wolf (BEL) | + 0" |
| 4 | Frans Maassen (NED) | + 23" |
| 5 | Dag Erik Pedersen (NOR) | + 23" |
| 6 | Marc van Orsouw (NED) | + 23" |
| 7 | Edwig Van Hooydonck (BEL) | + 23" |
| 8 | Wilfried Peeters (BEL) | + 3' 35" |
| 9 | Ronny Van Holen (BEL) | + 3' 35" |
| 10 | Carlo Bomans (BEL) | + 3' 35" |
