= 1982 Brabantse Pijl =

Race details
- Dates: 28 March 1982
- Stages: 1
- Distance: 166 km (103.1 mi)
- Winning time: 3h 58' 00"

Results
	Winner	Claude Criquielion (BEL)
	Second	Eddy Planckaert (BEL)
	Third	Ronny Van Holen (BEL)

The 1982 Brabantse Pijl was the 22nd edition of the Brabantse Pijl cycle race and was held on 28 March 1982. The race started in Sint-Genesius-Rode and finished in Alsemberg. The race was won by Claude Criquielion.

== General classification ==
Final general classification

Rank	Rider	Time
1	Claude Criquielion (BEL)	3h 58' 00"
2	Eddy Planckaert (BEL)	+ 1' 05"
3	Ronny Van Holen (BEL)	+ 1' 05"
4	Jozef Lieckens (BEL)	+ 1' 05"
5	Jos Jacobs (BEL)	+ 1' 05"
6	Hennie Kuiper (NED)	+ 1' 05"
7	Daniel Willems (BEL)	+ 1' 05"
8	Luc Govaerts (BEL)	+ 1' 05"
9	Ad Wijnands (NED)	+ 1' 05"
10	Gregor Braun (FRG)	+ 1' 05"
