= 1985 Grote Prijs Jef Scherens =

Race details
- Dates: 15 September 1985
- Stages: 1
- Distance: 232 km (144.2 mi)
- Winning time: 6h 10' 00"

Results
	Winner	Jozef Lieckens (BEL)
	Second	Willem Wijnant (BEL)
	Third	Gery Verlinden (BEL)

The 1985 Grote Prijs Jef Scherens was the 21st edition of the Grote Prijs Jef Scherens cycle race and was held on 15 September 1985. The race started and finished in Leuven. The race was won by Jozef Lieckens.

== General classification ==
Final general classification

Rank	Rider	Time
1	Jozef Lieckens (BEL)	6h 10' 00"
2	Willem Wijnant (BEL)	+ 0"
3	Gery Verlinden (BEL)	+ 0"
4	Eric McKenzie (NZL)	+ 0"
5	Ronny Van Holen (BEL)	+ 0"
6	Wim Van Eynde (BEL)	+ 0"
7	Luc Desmet (BEL)	+ 0"
8	Jan Wijnants (BEL)	+ 0"
9	Yves Godimus (BEL)	+ 0"
10	Patrick Verschueren (BEL)	+ 0"
