= 1991 Paris–Tours =

Race details
- Dates: 13 October 1991
- Stages: 1
- Distance: 286 km (177.7 mi)
- Winning time: 7h 26' 48"

Results
	Winner	Johan Capiot (BEL)	(TVM–Sanyo)
	Second	Olaf Ludwig (GER)	(Panasonic–Sportlife)
	Third	Nico Verhoeven (NED)	(PDM–Concorde–Ultima)

The 1991 Paris–Tours was the 85th edition of the Paris–Tours cycle race and was held on 13 October 1991. The race started in Issy-les-Moulineaux and finished in Tours. The race was won by Johan Capiot of the TVM team.

== General classification ==
Final general classification

Rank	Rider	Team	Time
1	Johan Capiot (BEL)	TVM–Sanyo	7h 26' 48"
2	Olaf Ludwig (GER)	Panasonic–Sportlife	+ 0"
3	Nico Verhoeven (NED)	PDM–Concorde–Ultima	+ 0"
4	Adri van der Poel (NED)	Tulip Computers	+ 0"
5	Rolf Sørensen (DEN)	Ariostea	+ 0"
6	Peter Pieters (NED)	Tulip Computers	+ 0"
7	Laurent Jalabert (FRA)	Toshiba	+ 0"
8	Frankie Andreu (USA)	Motorola	+ 0"
9	Johan Museeuw (BEL)	Lotto	+ 0"
10	Rudy Verdonck (BEL)	Weinmann–Eddy Merckx	+ 0"
