= 1992 Brabantse Pijl =

Race details
- Dates: 29 March 1992
- Stages: 1
- Distance: 186 km (115.6 mi)
- Winning time: 4h 56' 45"

Results
	Winner	Johan Capiot (BEL)
	Second	Paul Haghedooren (BEL)
	Third	Mario De Clercq (BEL)

The 1992 Brabantse Pijl was the 32nd edition of the Brabantse Pijl cycle race and was held on 29 March 1992. The race started in Sint-Genesius-Rode and finished in Alsemberg. The race was won by Johan Capiot.

== General classification ==
Final general classification

Rank	Rider	Time
1	Johan Capiot (BEL)	4h 56' 45"
2	Paul Haghedooren (BEL)	+ 0"
3	Mario De Clercq (BEL)	+ 0"
4	Edwig Van Hooydonck (BEL)	+ 0"
5	Jan Siemons (NED)	+ 0"
6	Benny Van Brabant (BEL)	+ 0"
7	Serge Baguet (BEL)	+ 0"
8	Giovanni Fidanza (ITA)	+ 0"
9	Jan Van Camp (BEL)	+ 0"
10	Eddy Bouwmans (NED)	+ 0"
