= 1998 Brabantse Pijl =

- Official event poster

Race details
- Dates: 29 March 1998
- Stages: 1
- Distance: 193.7 km (120.4 mi)
- Winning time: 4h 15' 50"

Results
	Winner	Johan Museeuw (BEL)
	Second	Germano Pierdomenico (ITA)
	Third	Michael Boogerd (NED)

The 1998 Brabantse Pijl was the 38th edition of the Brabantse Pijl cycle race and was held on 29 March 1998. The race started and finished in Alsemberg. The race was won by Johan Museeuw.

== General classification ==
Final general classification

Rank	Rider	Time
1	Johan Museeuw (BEL)	4h 15' 50"
2	Germano Pierdomenico (ITA)	+ 5"
3	Michael Boogerd (NED)	+ 12"
4	Wilfried Peeters (BEL)	+ 1' 10"
5	Marco Serpellini (ITA)	+ 1' 19"
6	Davide Casarotto (ITA)	+ 1' 35"
7	Christophe Mengin (FRA)	+ 2' 32"
8	Lauri Aus (EST)	+ 3' 48"
9	Nicolaj Bo Larsen (DEN)	s.t.
10	Massimiliano Mori (ITA)	s.t.
