= 1988 Brabantse Pijl =

Race details
- Dates: 27 March 1988
- Stages: 1
- Distance: 229 km (142.3 mi)
- Winning time: 5h 50' 00"

Results
	Winner	Johan Capiot (BEL)
	Second	Jean-Philippe Vandenbrande (BEL)
	Third	Rolf Gölz (FRG)

The 1988 Brabantse Pijl was the 28th edition of the Brabantse Pijl cycle race and was held on 27 March 1988. The race started in Sint-Genesius-Rode and finished in Alsemberg. The race was won by Johan Capiot.

== General classification ==
Final general classification

Rank	Rider	Time
1	Johan Capiot (BEL)	5h 50' 00"
2	Jean-Philippe Vandenbrande (BEL)	+ 32"
3	Rolf Gölz (FRG)	+ 32"
4	Edwig Van Hooydonck (BEL)	+ 5' 25"
5	Jan Van Camp (BEL)	+ 5' 25"
6	Marc Sergeant (BEL)	+ 5' 55"
7	Adri van der Poel (NED)	+ 7' 18"
8	Jan Nevens (BEL)	+ 8' 58"
9	Wilfried Peeters (BEL)	+ 11' 31"
10	Wim Van Eynde (BEL)	+ 11' 31"
