= 2004 Brabantse Pijl =

Race details
- Dates: 28 March 2004
- Stages: 1
- Distance: 199.3 km (123.8 mi)
- Winning time: 4h 30' 00"

Results
	Winner	Luca Paolini (ITA)
	Second	Michael Boogerd (NED)
	Third	Nico Sijmens (BEL)

The 2004 Brabantse Pijl was the 44th edition of the Brabantse Pijl cycle race and was held on 28 March 2004. The race started in Zaventem and finished in Alsemberg. The race was won by Luca Paolini.

== General classification ==
Final general classification

Rank	Rider	Time
1	Luca Paolini (ITA)	4h 30' 00"
2	Michael Boogerd (NED)	s.t.
3	Nico Sijmens (BEL)	s.t.
4	Didier Rous (FRA)	s.t.
5	Axel Merckx (BEL)	s.t.
6	Marc Lotz (NED)	s.t.
7	Xavier Florencio (ESP)	+ 1' 35"
8	Janek Tombak (EST)	+ 2' 40"
9	Karsten Kroon (NED)	s.t.
10	Michele Bartoli (ITA)	s.t.
