= 1985 Brabantse Pijl =

Race details
- Dates: 31 March 1985
- Stages: 1
- Distance: 172 km (106.9 mi)
- Winning time: 4h 18' 09"

Results
| | Winner | Adri van der Poel (NED) |
| | Second | Jean-Marie Wampers (BEL) |
| | Third | Laurent Fignon (FRA) |

The 1985 Brabantse Pijl was the 25th edition of the Brabantse Pijl cycle race and was held on 31 March 1985. The race started in Sint-Genesius-Rode and finished in Alsemberg. The race was won by Adri van der Poel.

== General classification ==
Final general classification

| Rank | Rider | Time |
|---|---|---|
| 1 | Adri van der Poel (NED) | 4h 18' 09" |
| 2 | Jean-Marie Wampers (BEL) | + 5" |
| 3 | Laurent Fignon (FRA) | + 8" |
| 4 | Phil Anderson (AUS) | + 15" |
| 5 | Bruno Wojtinek (FRA) | + 25" |
| 6 | Ludwig Wijnants (BEL) | + 25" |
| 7 | Patrick Onnockx (BEL) | + 25" |
| 8 | Benny Van Brabant (BEL) | + 25" |
| 9 | Paul Haghedooren (BEL) | + 25" |
| 10 | Claude Criquielion (BEL) | + 25" |
