= 1989 Scheldeprijs =

Race details
- Dates: 19 April 1989
- Stages: 1
- Distance: 199 km (123.7 mi)
- Winning time: 4h 47' 37"

Results
	Winner	Jean-Marie Wampers (BEL)
	Second	Frank Hoste (BEL)
	Third	John van den Akker (NED)

The 1989 Scheldeprijs was the 76th edition of the Scheldeprijs cycle race and was held on 19 April 1989. The race was won by Jean-Marie Wampers.

== General classification ==
Final general classification

Rank	Rider	Time
1	Jean-Marie Wampers (BEL)	4h 47' 37"
2	Frank Hoste (BEL)	+ 2"
3	John van den Akker (NED)	+ 1' 40"
4	Eric Vanderaerden (BEL)	+ 1' 40"
5	Wiebren Veenstra (NED)	+ 1' 40"
6	Adri van der Poel (NED)	+ 1' 40"
7	Remig Stumpf (FRG)	+ 1' 40"
8	Herman Frison (BEL)	+ 1' 40"
9	Etienne De Wilde (BEL)	+ 1' 40"
10	Hans Daams (NED)	+ 1' 40"
