= 1984 Grote Prijs Jef Scherens =

Race details
- Dates: 16 September 1984
- Stages: 1
- Distance: 232 km (144.2 mi)
- Winning time: 5h 53' 00"

Results
	Winner	Ronny Van Holen (BEL)
	Second	Jan Wijnants (BEL)
	Third	Johan Lammerts (NED)

The 1984 Grote Prijs Jef Scherens was the 20th edition of the Grote Prijs Jef Scherens cycle race and was held on 16 September 1984. The race started and finished in Leuven. The race was won by Ronny Van Holen.

== General classification ==
Final general classification

Rank	Rider	Time
1	Ronny Van Holen (BEL)	5h 53' 00"
2	Jan Wijnants (BEL)	+ 0"
3	Johan Lammerts (NED)	+ 32"
4	Adri van der Poel (NED)	+ 32"
5	Patrick Onnockx (BEL)	+ 32"
6	Gery Verlinden (BEL)	+ 32"
7	Herman Frison (BEL)	+ 32"
8	William Tackaert (BEL)	+ 32"
9	Marc Sergeant (BEL)	+ 32"
10	Jos Haex (BEL)	+ 32"
