= 1984 Brabantse Pijl =

Race details
- Dates: 25 March 1984
- Stages: 1
- Distance: 172 km (106.9 mi)
- Winning time: 4h 16' 52"

Results
	Winner	Ronny Van Holen (BEL)
	Second	Theo de Rooij (NED)
	Third	Paul Haghedooren (BEL)

The 1984 Brabantse Pijl was the 24th edition of the Brabantse Pijl cycle race and was held on 25 March 1984. The race started in Sint-Genesius-Rode and finished in Alsemberg. The race was won by Ronny Van Holen.

== General classification ==
Final general classification

Rank	Rider	Time
1	Ronny Van Holen (BEL)	4h 16' 52"
2	Theo de Rooij (NED)	+ 0"
3	Paul Haghedooren (BEL)	+ 0"
4	Jean-Philippe Vandenbrande (BEL)	+ 0"
5	Ludwig Wijnants (BEL)	+ 0"
6	Patrick Versluys (BEL)	+ 13"
7	Jean-Marie Wampers (BEL)	+ 22"
8	Peter Winnen (NED)	+ 22"
9	Hans Langerijs (NED)	+ 38"
10	Jos Jacobs (BEL)	+ 55"
