= 1991 Brabantse Pijl =

Race details
- Dates: 31 March 1991
- Stages: 1
- Distance: 178 km (110.6 mi)
- Winning time: 4h 22' 00"

Results
	Winner	Edwig Van Hooydonck (BEL)
	Second	Dirk De Wolf (BEL)
	Third	Maurizio Fondriest (ITA)

The 1991 Brabantse Pijl was the 31st edition of the Brabantse Pijl cycle race and was held on 31 March 1991. The race started in Sint-Genesius-Rode and finished in Alsemberg. The race was won by Edwig Van Hooydonck.

== General classification ==
Final general classification

Rank	Rider	Time
1	Edwig Van Hooydonck (BEL)	4h 22' 00"
2	Dirk De Wolf (BEL)	+ 0"
3	Maurizio Fondriest (ITA)	+ 16"
4	Ad Wijnands (NED)	+ 16"
5	Benny Van Brabant (BEL)	+ 16"
6	Benny Heylen (BEL)	+ 16"
7	Moreno Argentin (ITA)	+ 16"
8	Andrei Tchmil (URS)	+ 16"
9	Brian Holm (DEN)	+ 16"
10	Claude Criquielion (BEL)	+ 16"
