= 1983 Grote Prijs Jef Scherens =

Race details
- Dates: 18 September 1983
- Stages: 1
- Distance: 232 km (144.2 mi)
- Winning time: 6h 11' 00"

Results
	Winner	Adri van der Poel (NED)
	Second	Ronny Van Holen (BEL)
	Third	Jan Bogaert (BEL)

The 1983 Grote Prijs Jef Scherens was the 19th edition of the Grote Prijs Jef Scherens cycle race and was held on 18 September 1983. The race started and finished in Leuven. The race was won by Adri van der Poel.

== General classification ==
Final general classification

Rank	Rider	Time
1	Adri van der Poel (NED)	6h 11' 00"
2	Ronny Van Holen (BEL)	+ 0"
3	Jan Bogaert (BEL)	+ 1' 10"
4	Dirk Demol (BEL)	+ 1' 10"
5	Jan Wijnants (BEL)	+ 1' 10"
6	Patrick Onnockx (BEL)	+ 1' 10"
7	Luc De Decker (BEL)	+ 1' 10"
8	Rudy Rogiers (BEL)	+ 1' 10"
9	Werner Devos (BEL)	+ 1' 10"
10	Herman Frison (BEL)	+ 1' 10"
