= 1983 Dwars door België =

Race details
- Dates: 24 March 1983
- Stages: 1
- Distance: 222 km (137.9 mi)
- Winning time: 5h 43' 00"

Results
	Winner	Etienne De Wilde (BEL)
	Second	Jan Raas (NED)
	Third	Eric Vanderaerden (BEL)

The 1983 Dwars door België was the 38th edition of the Dwars door Vlaanderen cycle race and was held on 24 March 1983. The race started and finished in Waregem. The race was won by Etienne De Wilde.

Gerrie Knetemann hit a parked car during the race, and was sent to hospital with serious injuries, that took him out of race for a good part of the rest of the season.

== General classification ==
Final general classification

Rank	Rider	Time
1	Etienne De Wilde (BEL)	5h 43' 00"
2	Jan Raas (NED)	+ 15"
3	Eric Vanderaerden (BEL)	+ 15"
4	Ferdi Van Den Haute (BEL)	+ 15"
5	Hans Langerijs (NED)	+ 15"
6	Adri van Houwelingen (NED)	+ 1' 35"
7	Rudy Matthijs (BEL)	+ 1' 35"
8	Noël Segers (BEL)	+ 1' 35"
9	Rudy Rogiers (BEL)	+ 1' 35"
10	Johan Lammerts (NED)	+ 1' 35"
