= Ronny Van Holen =

Belgian cyclist (born 1959)

Personal information
- Born: 9 March 1959 (age 67) Aalst, Belgium

Cycling career
- Sport: Cycling
- Discipline: Road
- Role: Rider

Professional teams
- 1981–1985: Safir–Ludo–Galli
- 1986: Lotto–Emerxil–Merckx
- 1987: Lucas–Arkel
- 1988: Roland
- 1989: AD Renting–W-Cup–Bottecchia
- 1990–1992: IOC–Tulip Computers

Major wins
- Single-day races and Classics Omloop Het Volk (1988) Brabantse Pijl (1984) Grote Prijs Jef Scherens (1984, 1987) Le Samyn (1985) Druivenkoers-Overijse (1991)

Ronny Van Holen (born 9 March 1959) is a Belgian former racing cyclist. He rode in eight Grand Tours between 1981 and 1989.

== Major results ==
1977
1st Road race, UCI Junior Road World Championships
1978
3rd Circuit de Wallonie
1979
1st Romsée-Stavelot-Romsée
2nd Overall Tour de Liège
2nd Ronde van Vlaanderen Beloften
8th Overall GP Tell

1st Stages 4 & 8

1980
1st Brussels-Opwijk
1st Stage 4 Flèche du Sud
1981
2nd Schaal Sels
7th Omloop van de Vlaamse Scheldeboorden
1982
1st Grand Prix Cerami
3rd Brabantse Pijl
3rd GP de Denain
4th Polder-Kempen
5th Clásica de San Sebastián
6th Overall Deutschland Tour
7th Overall Vuelta a Aragón
7th Circuit des Frontières
9th GP du canton d'Argovie
1983
2nd Grote Prijs Jef Scherens
7th GP du canton d'Argovie
8th Grand Prix de Wallonie
9th Ronde van Limburg
1984
1st Brabantse Pijl
1st Grote Prijs Jef Scherens
1st Stage 7b Volta a Catalunya
1st Stage 5 Setmana Catalana de Ciclisme
2nd Druivenkoers-Overijse
3rd Overall Tour of Belgium
7th Scheldeprijs
1985
1st Le Samyn
3rd Grand Prix Cerami
5th Grote Prijs Jef Scherens
6th GP de Fourmies
1986
1st Binche–Tournai–Binche
3rd Amstel Gold Race
3rd Nokere Koerse
4th Road race, National Road Championships
4th Kampioenschap van Vlaanderen
5th Tour of Flanders
1987
1st Grote Prijs Jef Scherens
3rd Omloop van de Westhoek
4th Road race, National Road Championships
7th Tour of Flanders
1988
1st Omloop Het Volk
5th De Kustpijl
7th GP de Fourmies
1989
9th Brabantse Pijl
1990
3rd Tour de Vendée
1991
1st Druivenkoers-Overijse
8th Grand Prix Impanis-Van Petegem
1992
5th Kampioenschap van Vlaanderen
