= Jean-Marie Wampers =

Belgian cyclist

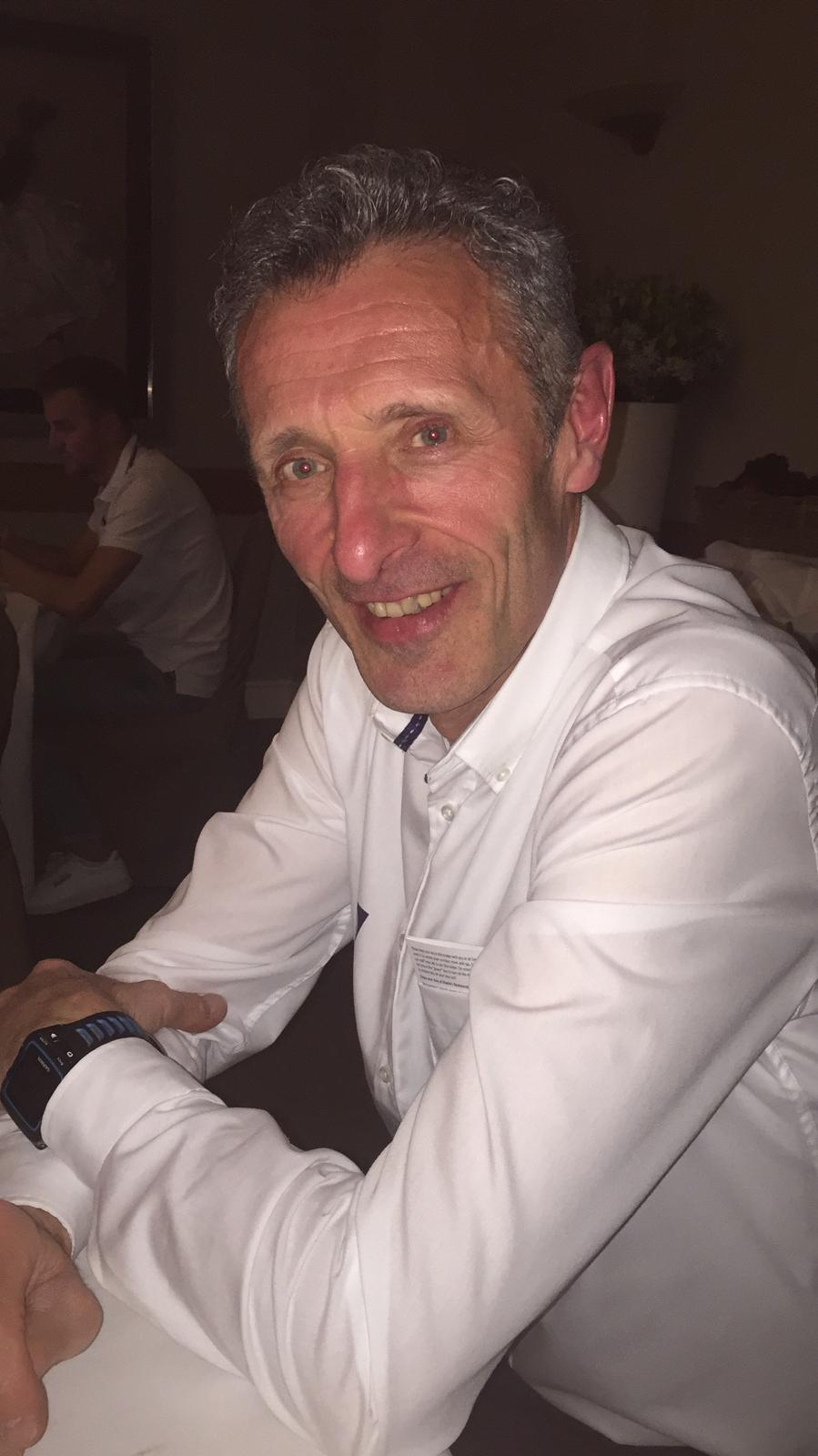

Personal information
- Full name: Jean-Marie Wampers
- Born: 7 April 1959 (age 67) Uccle, Belgium
- Height: 1.88 m (6 ft 2 in)
- Weight: 82 kg (181 lb)

Cycling career
- Sport: Cycling
- Current team: Retired
- Discipline: Road
- Role: Rider

Professional teams
- 1981: Santini–Selle Italia
- 1982: Gis Gelati–Olmo
- 1983–1987: Splendor–Euro Shop
- 1988–1991: Panasonic–Isostar–Colnago–Agu
- 1992: Collstrop–Garden Wood

Major wins
- One-day races and Classics Paris–Roubaix (1989) Scheldeprijs (1989) Rund um den Henninger Turm (1986, 1989)

Jean-Marie Wampers (born 7 April 1959) is a former professional road racing cyclist from Belgium. He was a professional between 1981 and 1992, achieving his greatest triumph when he won Paris–Roubaix in 1989.

== Major results ==
1978
3rd Overall Tour de Namur

1st Stage 1

1980
3rd Overall Triptyque Ardennais

1st Stage 3b

1981
3rd Giro del Lazio
4th Giro dell'Emilia
5th Milano–Torino
7th Coppa Bernocchi
9th Milano–Vignola
1982
1st Gran Premio Città di Camaiore
10th Giro dell'Appennino
1983
2nd Circuit des Frontières
3rd Polder-Kempen
5th Kampioenschap van Vlaanderen
5th GP Eddy Merckx
6th Paris–Tours
8th Paris–Brussels
8th Trofeo Laigueglia
1984
1st Druivenkoers Overijse
2nd Scheldeprijs
4th Brussel–Ingooigem
5th GP Victor Standaert
6th GP Eddy Merckx
7th Brabantse Pijl
8th Binche–Tournai–Binche
10th Overall Tour of Belgium
1985
1st Nationale Sluitingsprijs
2nd Brabantse Pijl
9th Tour of Flanders
1986
1st Rund um den Henninger-Turm
1st Omloop van het Leiedal
3rd Gent–Wevelgem
3rd GP de Fourmies
4th Brabantse Pijl
6th Overall Four Days of Dunkirk

1st Stage 4

9th Paris–Brussels
1987
3rd Brabantse Pijl
4th Dwars door België
9th Overall Four Days of Dunkirk
10th Overall Three Days of De Panne
1988
5th Tour du Nord-Ouest
1989
1st Paris–Roubaix
1st Scheldeprijs
1st Rund um den Henninger-Turm
2nd Le Samyn
7th E3 Prijs Vlaanderen
1990
5th Paris–Roubaix
5th Gent–Wevelgem
8th E3 Prijs Vlaanderen
1992
1st Binche–Tournai–Binche
2nd Omloop van de Westhoek
