= 1987 Dwars door België =

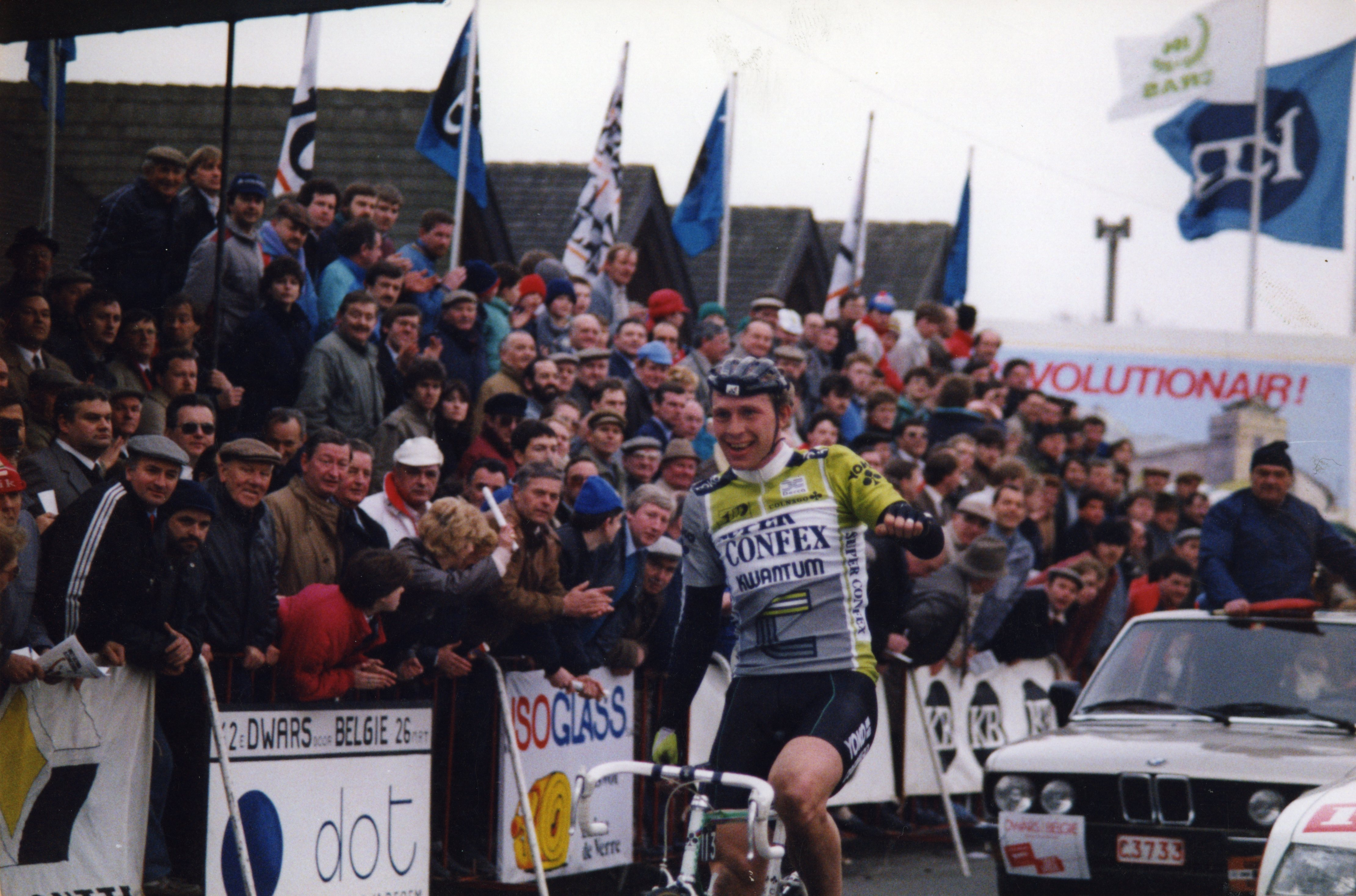
- Jelle Nijdam arriving in 1987 Dwars door België in Waregem (Collection KOERS. Museum van de Wielersport)

Race details
- Dates: 26 March 1987
- Stages: 1
- Distance: 226 km (140.4 mi)
- Winning time: 5h 31' 00"

Results
	Winner	Jelle Nijdam (NED)
	Second	Herman Frison (BEL)
	Third	Sean Kelly (IRL)

The 1987 Dwars door België was the 42nd edition of the Dwars door Vlaanderen cycle race and was held on 26 March 1987. The race started and finished in Waregem. The race was won by Jelle Nijdam.

== General classification ==
Final general classification

Rank	Rider	Time
1	Jelle Nijdam (NED)	5h 31' 00"
2	Herman Frison (BEL)	+ 53"
3	Sean Kelly (IRL)	+ 53"
4	Jean-Marie Wampers (BEL)	+ 53"
5	Wim Van Eynde (BEL)	+ 1' 25"
6	Gerrit Solleveld (NED)	+ 1' 35"
7	Marc van Orsouw (NED)	+ 1' 35"
8	Jos Haex (BEL)	+ 1' 35"
9	Franky van Oyen (BEL)	+ 2' 25"
10	Johan Capiot (BEL)	+ 2' 35"
