= Werner Devos =

Belgian cyclist (born 1957)

Personal information
- Full name: Werner Devos
- Born: 11 June 1957 (age 69) Roeselare, Belgium

Cycling career
- Sport: Cycling
- Role: Rider

Werner Devos (born 11 June 1957) is a former Belgian racing cyclist. He finished in last place in the 1982 Tour de France.

== Major results ==
1979
3rd Kattekoers
1980
1st Ronde van Vlaanderen Beloften
3rd Petegem-aan-de-Leie
1981
3rd Omloop van het Houtland Lichtervelde
4th Brussel-Ingooigem
10th Circuit des Frontières
1982
1st Ronde van Limburg
2nd De Kustpijl
4th E3 Harelbeke
4th GP du Tournaisis
5th Grote Prijs Jef Scherens
7th Brussel-Ingooigem
9th Paris–Tours
1983
1st Stage 8 Vuelta a Aragón
1st Polder-Kempen
2nd Omloop van het Houtland Lichtervelde
5th Brussel-Ingooigem
5th De Kustpijl
9th Grote Prijs Jef Scherens
1984
5th Brussel-Ingooigem
1986
3rd Omloop van het Houtland Lichtervelde
8th E3 Harelbeke
9th Circuit des Frontières
1987
1st Stage 1 Vuelta a Cantabria
1st Stage 3 Tour d'Armorique
1st Stage 6 Danmark Rundt
3rd Binche-Tournai-Binche
4th Grote Prijs Jef Scherens
10th Brussel-Ingooigem
1988
1st Omloop Schelde-Durme
9th Nokere Koerse
9th Circuit des Frontières
