= Hans Langerijs =

Dutch cyclist

Personal information
- Born: 14 January 1953 (age 73) Blokker, Netherlands

Cycling career
- Sport: Cycling
- Discipline: Road
- Role: Rider

Professional teams
- 1978: Jet Star Jeans
- 1979: Fangio–Iso–Bel
- 1979: HB Alarmsystemen
- 1980–1981: DAF Trucks–Lejeune
- 1982: B&S–Elro–Concorde
- 1983: Beckers Snacks
- 1984: AVP–Viditel
- 1985: Nikon–Van Schilt
- 1986: PDM–Ultima–Concorde

Hans Langerijs (born 14 January 1953) is a Dutch former racing cyclist. He rode in the 1980 Tour de France.

== Major results ==
1975
1st Overall Olympia's Tour
1977
1st Overall Niedersachsen Rundfahrt
1978
9th Overall Setmana Catalana de Ciclisme
1979
5th Overall Circuit Cycliste Sarthe

1st Stage 4b

1980
5th Overall Driedaagse van De Panne-Koksijde
1982
6th La Flèche Wallonne
9th Dwars door België
1983
5th Dwars door België
1984
7th Kuurne–Brussels–Kuurne
9th Brabantse Pijl
