= Marc van Orsouw =

Dutch cyclist

Personal information
- Born: 12 April 1964 (age 62) Oijen, Netherlands

Cycling career
- Sport: Cycling
- Discipline: Road
- Role: Rider

Professional teams
- 1986–1990: PDM–Ultima–Concorde
- 1991–1992: Panasonic–Sportlife
- 1993: Team Telekom

Marc van Orsouw (born 12 April 1964) is a Dutch former racing cyclist. He rode in eight Grand Tours between 1986 and 1994.

== Major results ==
1983
1st Tour du Jura
1985
2nd Ronde van Limburg
1986
1st Hel van het Mergelland
1st Gran Premio della Liberazione
1987
7th Overall Tour du Haut Var
7th Dwars door België
1988
4th Tour du Nord-Ouest
1989
1st Stage 2b Volta a Catalunya (TTT)
6th Brabantse Pijl
1992
3rd GP Stad Vilvoorde
7th Grote Prijs Jef Scherens
