= 1986 Tour of Flanders =

Race details
- Dates: 6 April 1986
- Stages: 1
- Distance: 275 km (171 mi)
- Winning time: 7h 10' 50"

Results
	Winner	Adrie van der Poel (NED)	(Kwantum Hallen-Decosol)
	Second	Sean Kelly (IRL)	(KAS)
	Third	Jean-Philippe Vandenbrande (BEL)	(Hitachi-Marc-Splendor)

The 70th running of the Tour of Flanders cycling race was held on 6 April 1986. It was won by Dutch rider Adrie van der Poel in a four-man sprint before Ireland's Sean Kelly.

== Race summary ==
A breakaway of ten riders was formed after the Koppenberg, from which Belgian Eddy Planckaert and Canadian Steve Bauer broke clear at 30 km from the finish. Bauer dropped Planckaert on the Muur van Geraardsbergen, but was joined by Sean Kelly, Adrie van der Poel and Jean-Philippe Vandenbrande at 7 km from the finish. In a four-man sprint, Dutchman van der Poel surprisingly beat Kelly. Vandenbrande was third, Bauer – the first Canadian cyclist in the top-10 – fourth.

== Route ==
The race started in Sint-Niklaas and finished in Meerbeke (Ninove) – totaling 274 km. The course featured 12 categorized climbs:

- Molenberg
- Oude Kwaremont
- Koppenberg
- Taaienberg
- Berg ten Houte
- Eikenberg
- Varent
- Keiweg-Leberg
- Berendries
- Muur-Kapelmuur
- Bosberg
- Pollareberg

== Results ==
	Cyclist	Team	Time
1	(Netherlands) Adrie van der Poel	Kwantum Hallen-Decosol	7 h 10 min 50 s
2	(Republic of Ireland) Seán Kelly	KAS	s.t.
3	(Belgium) Jean-Philippe Vandenbrande	Hitachi-Marc-Splendor	s.t.
4	(Canada) Steve Bauer	La Vie Claire	s.t.
5	(Belgium) Ronny Van Holen	Lotto–Emerxil–Merckx	+ 30"
6	(Belgium) Fons de Wolf	Skala-Skil	s.t.
7	(Italy) Bruno Leali	Carrera-Inoxpran	s.t.
8	(Belgium) Claude Criquielion	Hitachi-Marc-Splendor	s.t.
9	(France) Yvon Madiot	Système U	s.t.
10	(Belgium) Eric Vanderaerden	Panasonic	+ 1' 00"
