= Marc Bouillon =

Belgian cyclist

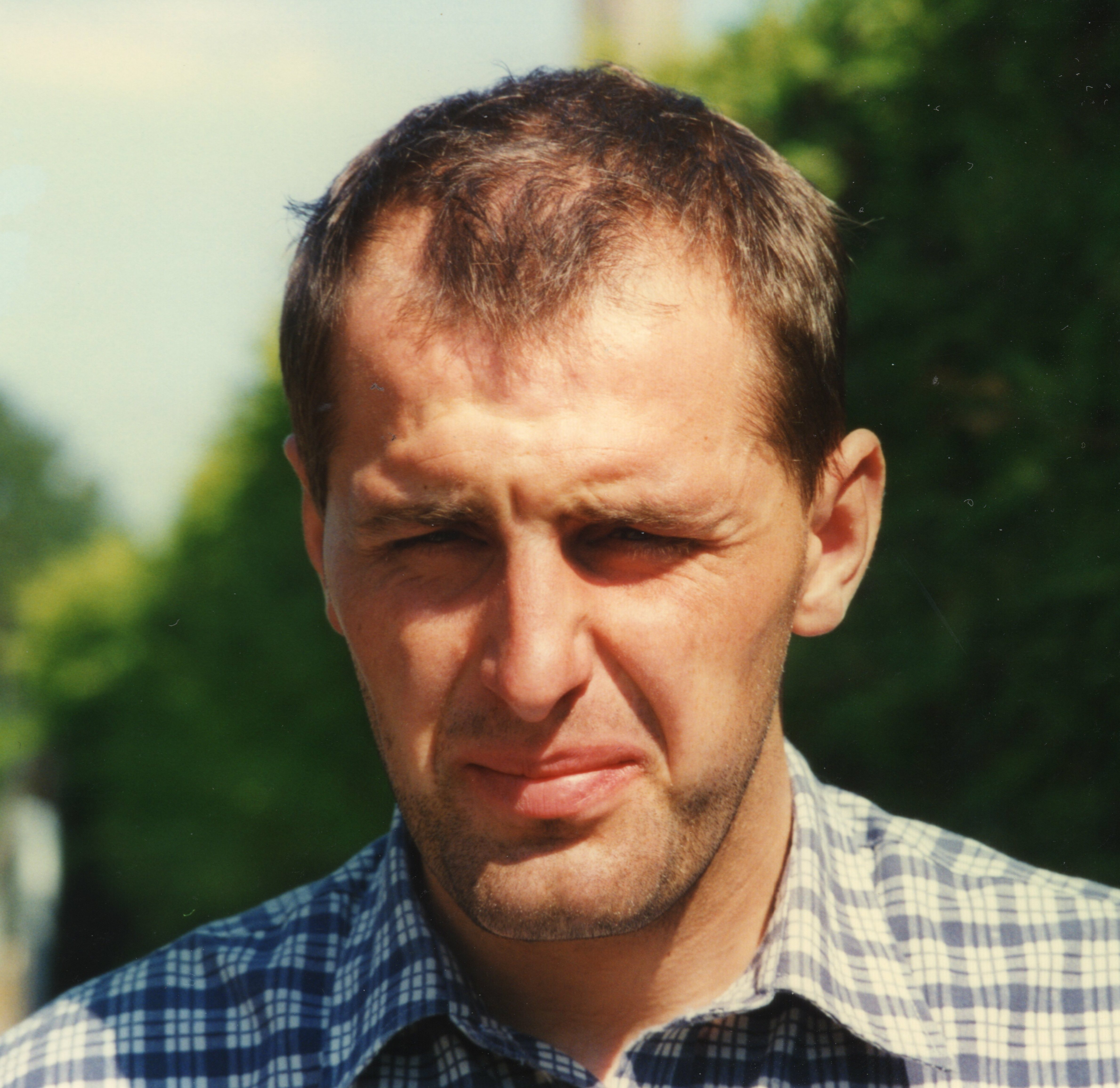
- Bouillon in 1996

Personal information
- Born: 15 June 1968 (age 58) Soignies, Belgium

Cycling career
- Sport: Cycling
- Current team: Retired
- Discipline: Road
- Role: Rider

Professional teams
- 1991: Tonton Tapis–GB
- 1992–1993: Collstrop–Garden Wood
- 1995–1998: Cédico–Sunjets–Ville de Charleroi

Marc Bouillon (born 15 June 1968) is a Belgian former cyclist.

== Major results ==
1991
10th GP de Fourmies
1992
2nd Grand Prix de Wallonie
4th Circuit des Frontières
9th Paris–Camembert
1993
1st Cholet-Pays de Loire
8th De Brabantse Pijl
1994
1st Stage 1 Circuit Franco-Belge
1st Stages 2 & 4 Tour de Namur
1996
1st Route Adélie de Vitré
1st Tour d'Armorique
1st Stage 5 Quatre Jours de l'Aisne
7th GP de la Ville de Rennes

=== Grand Tour general classification results timeline ===
Grand Tour	1992	1993
Giro d'Italia	—	—
Tour de France	—	—
Vuelta a España	107	DNF
