= 1984 Scheldeprijs =

Race details
- Dates: 31 July 1984
- Stages: 1
- Distance: 244 km (151.6 mi)
- Winning time: 5h 58' 00"

Results
	Winner	Ludo Peeters (BEL)
	Second	Jean-Marie Wampers (BEL)
	Third	Ludwig Wijnants (BEL)

The 1984 Scheldeprijs was the 71st edition of the Scheldeprijs cycle race and was held on 31 July 1984. The race was won by Ludo Peeters.

== General classification ==
Final general classification

Rank	Rider	Time
1	Ludo Peeters (BEL)	5h 58' 00"
2	Jean-Marie Wampers (BEL)	+ 33"
3	Ludwig Wijnants (BEL)	+ 50"
4	Teun van Vliet (NED)	+ 50"
5	Bert Wekema (NED)	+ 50"
6	Stefan Aerts (NED)	+ 50"
7	Ronny Van Holen (BEL)	+ 2' 00"
8	Luc Govaerts (BEL)	+ 2' 00"
9	Walter Planckaert (BEL)	+ 2' 15"
10	William Tackaert (BEL)	+ 2' 15"
