= 1996 Grote Prijs Jef Scherens =

Race details
- Dates: 1 September 1996
- Stages: 1
- Distance: 185 km (115.0 mi)
- Winning time: 4h 12' 00"

Results
	Winner	Jans Koerts (NED)
	Second	Andrzej Sypytkowski (POL)
	Third	Wim Omloop (BEL)

The 1996 Grote Prijs Jef Scherens was the 30th edition of the Grote Prijs Jef Scherens cycle race and was held on 1 September 1996. The race started and finished in Leuven. The race was won by Jans Koerts.

== General classification ==
Final general classification

Rank	Rider	Time
1	Jans Koerts (NED)	4h 12' 00"
2	Andrzej Sypytkowski (POL)	+ 0"
3	Wim Omloop (BEL)	+ 0"
4	Henk Vogels (AUS)	+ 0"
5	Andreas Klier (GER)	+ 13"
6	Jan Boven (NED)	+ 13"
7	Jacek Mickiewicz (POL)	+ 16"
8	Niko Eeckhout (BEL)	+ 1' 34"
9	Johan Capiot (BEL)	+ 1' 40"
10	Steven Van Malderghem (BEL)	+ 1' 40"
