= 1987 Grote Prijs Jef Scherens =

Race details
- Dates: 20 September 1987
- Stages: 1
- Distance: 208 km (129.2 mi)
- Winning time: 5h 23' 00"

Results
| | Winner | Ronny Van Holen (BEL) |
| | Second | Dirk Clarysse (BEL) |
| | Third | Wilfried Peeters (BEL) |

The 1987 Grote Prijs Jef Scherens was the 23rd edition of the Grote Prijs Jef Scherens cycle race and was held on 20 September 1987. The race started and finished in Leuven. The race was won by Ronny Van Holen.

== General classification ==
Final general classification

| Rank | Rider | Time |
|---|---|---|
| 1 | Ronny Van Holen (BEL) | 5h 23' 00" |
| 2 | Dirk Clarysse (BEL) | + 0" |
| 3 | Wilfried Peeters (BEL) | + 0" |
| 4 | Werner Devos (BEL) | + 6" |
| 5 | Dick Dekker (NED) | + 6" |
| 6 | Koen Van Rooy (BEL) | + 6" |
| 7 | Martin Schalkers (NED) | + 6" |
| 8 | Patrick Roelandt (BEL) | + 6" |
| 9 | Bruno Geuens (BEL) | + 6" |
| 10 | Jan Bogaert (BEL) | + 6" |
