= Johan Lammerts =

Dutch cyclist

Personal information
- Born: 2 October 1960 (age 66) Bergen-op-Zoom, North Brabant, Netherlands

Cycling career
- Sport: Cycling
- Current team: Retired
- Discipline: Road
- Role: Rider

Professional teams
- 1982–1983: TI–Raleigh–Campagnolo
- 1984–1985: Panasonic–Raleigh
- 1986: Vini Ricordi–Pinarello–Sidermec
- 1987–1988: Toshiba–Look
- 1989: AD Renting–W-Cup–Bottecchia
- 1990–1992: Z–Tomasso

Major wins
- Grand Tours Tour de France 1 individual stage (1985) Stage races Ronde van Nederland (1984) One-day races and Classics Tour of Flanders (1984)

Johan Lammerts (born 2 October 1960) is a retired road bicycle racer from the Netherlands, who was a professional rider from 1982 to 1992. His biggest success came in 1984, when he won the Tour of Flanders and the Ronde van Nederland. Lammerts also won the 20th stage of the 1985 Tour de France.

== Career ==
Lammerts won Stage 20 of the 1985 Tour de France. He attacked with six miles to go and managed a gap of 21 seconds by the finish.

In 1987 while riding the Züri-Metzgete the conditions were atrocious such that only 20 riders finished, Lammerts was one of the last finishers.

== Post cycling ==
After retiring as a rider he became the coach of the Dutch National Women's and Cyclocross teams. In 2012 Lammerts became coach of the Dutch national cycling team.

== Major results ==
1982
1st Ronde van Limburg
1st Stage 1 Peace Race
1st Stage 6a Grand Prix Guillaume Tell
1983
5th Paris–Brussels
10th Dwars door België
1984
1st Overall Ronde van Nederland
1st Tour of Flanders
3rd Grote Prijs Jef Scherens
4th Kampioenschap van Vlaanderen
7th Omloop Het Volk
8th Grand Prix Impanis-Van Petegem
1985
1st Stage 20 Tour de France
2nd Rund um den Henninger Turm
4th Binche–Tournai–Binche
6th Overall Three Days of De Panne
8th Overall Tirreno–Adriatico
9th Amstel Gold Race
1986
4th Overall Ronde van Nederland
10th Giro della Provincia di reggio Calabria
1987
2nd Kuurne–Brussels–Kuurne
1988
1st Stage 4b Tour of Britain
2nd Omloop Het Volk
10th Paris–Roubaix
1989
1st Stage 4 Vuelta a los Valles Mineros
2nd Road race, National Road Championships
6th Brussel–Ingooigem
9th Tour of Flanders
10th Paris–Roubaix
1990
6th Omloop Het Volk
6th Brabantse Pijl
8th Overall Three Days of De Panne
9th Overall Tour of Ireland

1st Stage 1

1991
1st Stage 5 Vuelta y Ruta de Mexico

=== Tour de France results ===
- 1983 – 72nd
- 1985 – 75th
- 1988 – 130th
- 1989 – 123rd
