= Louis de Koning =

Dutch cyclist

Personal information
- Born: 19 October 1967 (age 58) Brielle, Netherlands

Cycling career
- Sport: Cycling
- Current team: Retired
- Discipline: Road
- Role: Rider

Amateur team
- 1996: Giant–Löwik

Professional teams
- 1988–1992: Panasonic–Isostar–Colnago–Agu
- 1993–1994: WordPerfect–Colnago–Decca
- 1997: TVM–Farm Frites
- 1999: Giant–Löwik
- 2005: Fondas Imabo–Doorisol

Louis de Koning (born 19 October 1967 in Brielle) is a Dutch former professional road cyclist.

== Major results ==
1985
3rd Points race, UCI Junior Track World Championships
1988
1st Ronde van Midden-Nederland
1st Ronde van Limburg
3rd Overall Olympia's Tour
1989
4th Tour du Nord-Ouest
1990
1st Grote Prijs Beeckman-De Caluwé
7th Grand Prix des Amériques
1991
2nd De Kustpijl
3rd Wingene Koers
1992
1st Rund um Köln
1st Grote Prijs Raymond Impanis
1st Stage 2a Ronde van Nederland
5th Grand Prix de Fourmies
6th Japan Cup Cycle Road Race
7th Overall Tour of Ireland

1st Stage 5

1995
1st Ronde van Overijssel
3rd Ronde van Limburg
1996
1st Ster van Zwolle
1st Ronde van Limburg
1st GP Wielerrevue
1st Stage 8 Olympia's Tour
1st Stage 1 OZ Wielerweekend
1997
3rd Ronde van Drenthe
4th Brussels–Ingooigem
10th Hel van het Mergelland
1998
1st Ronde van Noord-Holland
2001
3rd Road race, National Road Championships
5th Tour Beneden-Maas
2002
1st Omloop Houtse Linies
