= 1992 Grote Prijs Jef Scherens =

Race details
- Dates: 30 August 1992
- Stages: 1
- Distance: 184 km (114.3 mi)
- Winning time: 4h 33' 00"

Results
	Winner	Hendrik Redant (BEL)
	Second	Johan Museeuw (BEL)
	Third	Olaf Ludwig (GER)

The 1992 Grote Prijs Jef Scherens was the 26th edition of the Grote Prijs Jef Scherens cycle race and was held on 30 August 1992. The race started and finished in Leuven. The race was won by Hendrik Redant.

== General classification ==
Final general classification

Rank	Rider	Time
1	Hendrik Redant (BEL)	4h 16' 35"
2	Johan Museeuw (BEL)	+ 0"
3	Olaf Ludwig (GER)	+ 52"
4	Herman Frison (BEL)	+ 52"
5	Patrick Van Roosbroeck (BEL)	+ 52"
6	Brian Holm (DEN)	+ 52"
7	Marc van Orsouw (NED)	+ 52"
8	Rudy Verdonck (BEL)	+ 52"
9	Jo Planckaert (BEL)	+ 1' 15"
10	Fabrice Naessens (BEL)	+ 1' 15"
