= Jean-Philippe Vandenbrande =

Belgian cyclist

Personal information
- Born: 4 December 1955 (age 70) Dworp, Belgium

Cycling career
- Sport: Cycling
- Discipline: Road
- Role: Rider

Professional teams
- 1978–1981: Safir–Beyers–Ludo
- 1982–1988: Splendor–Wickes Bouwmarkt
- 1989–1990: TVM–Ragno

Major wins
- Grand Tours Vuelta a España 1 individual stage (1978)

Jean-Philippe "Flupke" Vandenbrande (born 4 December 1955) is a Belgian former racing cyclist. He rode in seven editions of the Tour de France. His best finish was 37th overall in 1988. He also won a stage of the 1978 Vuelta a España.

== Major results ==
1978
1st Stage 15 Vuelta a España
1980
2nd Züri-Metzgete
3rd Grand Prix de Plumelec-Morbihan
3rd Paris–Brussels
5th Rund um den Henninger Turm
8th Brabantse Pijl
10th Amstel Gold Race
1981
1st Stage 5 Deutschland Tour
6th Rund um den Henninger Turm
8th GP de Fourmies
1982
10th Grote Prijs Jef Scherens
10th Brussels–Ingooigem
1983
10th Paris–Brussels
1984
1st Stage 7 Vuelta a Colombia
4th Tour of Flanders
4th Brabantse Pijl
9th Paris–Brussels
1985
2nd Paris–Brussels
8th Züri-Metzgete
10th Gent–Wevelgem
10th Overall Route du Sud
1986
3rd Tour of Flanders
5th Züri-Metzgete
6th Rund um den Henninger Turm
7th Liège–Bastogne–Liège
10th Milan–San Remo
1987
4th Paris–Roubaix
4th Züri-Metzgete
7th Brabantse Pijl
1988
2nd Brabantse Pijl
3rd Road race, National Road Championships
3rd Tour du Nord-Ouest
5th Overall GP du Midi-Libre
5th Rund um den Henninger Turm
1989
1st Grand Prix de la Libération (TTT)
1990
1st Stage 5 Vuelta a Cantabria
8th Brabantse Pijl
