= 1985 Three Days of De Panne =

Race details
- Dates: 26 March–28 March 1985
- Stages: 3
- Distance: 546 km (339 mi)
- Winning time: 14h 15' 09"

Results
	Winner	Jean-Luc Vandenbroucke (BEL)
	Second	Sean Kelly (IRL)
	Third	Adri van der Poel (NED)

The 1985 Three Days of De Panne was the 9th edition of the Three Days of De Panne cycle race and was held on 26 March to 28 March 1985. The race started in Tielen and finished in De Panne. The race was won by Jean-Luc Vandenbroucke.

== General classification ==
Final general classification

Rank	Rider	Time
1	Jean-Luc Vandenbroucke (BEL)	14h 15' 09"
2	Sean Kelly (IRL)	+ 1"
3	Adri van der Poel (NED)	+ 5"
4	Jelle Nijdam (NED)	+ 21"
5	Eddy Planckaert (BEL)	+ 26"
6	Johan Lammerts (NED)	+ 39"
7	Jozef Lieckens (BEL)	+ 43"
8	André Lurquin (BEL)	+ 50"
9	William Tackaert (BEL)	+ 51"
10	Jos Jacobs (BEL)	+ 56"
