= Massimiliano Mori =

Italian cyclist

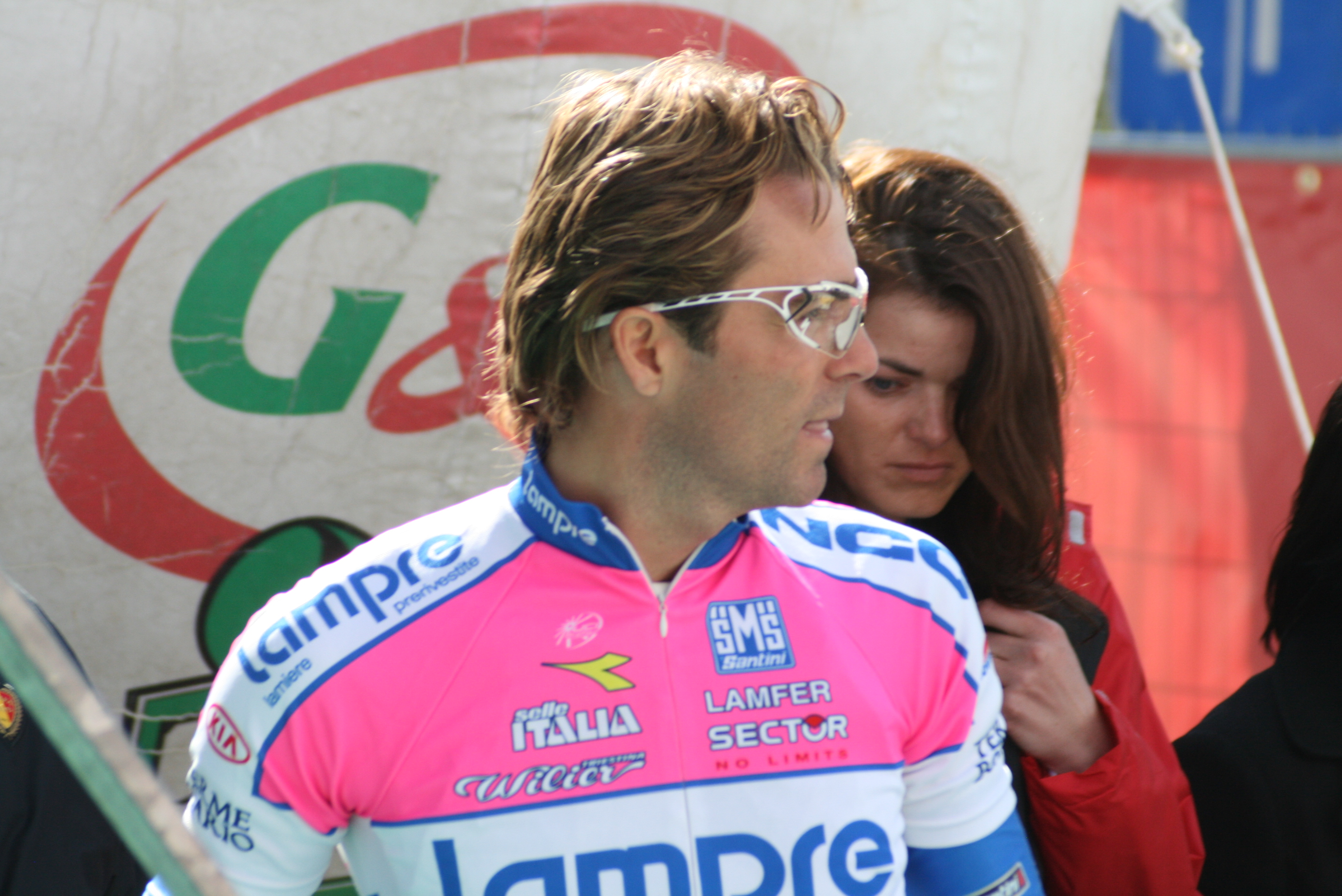

Personal information
- Full name: Massimiliano Mori
- Born: 8 January 1974 (age 52) San Miniato, Tuscany, Italy
- Height: 1.74 m (5 ft 9 in)
- Weight: 77 kg (170 lb)

Cycling career
- Sport: Cycling
- Discipline: Road
- Role: Rider

Professional teams
- 1996–2001: Saeco
- 2002: Mercatone Uno
- 2003: Formaggi Pinzolo Fiavè
- 2004: Domina Vacanze
- 2005–2006: Naturino-Sapore di Mare
- 2007–2010: Lampre–Fondital

Massimiliano Mori (born 8 January 1974, in San Miniato, Tuscany) is an Italian former professional road bicycle racer. Massimiliano Mori is the son of former professional cyclist Primo Mori.

In 2003, Mori was involved in a doping incident, when, during the Tirreno Adriatico, he had to give a urine test, and a hidden can of urine was found. Mori and his team leader Gabriele di Francesco were sent home. His urine sample came back negative, but the Italian Olympic Committee continued the investigation into possible fraud.

At the end of 2009, when it was not certain if Lampre would renew his contract, Mori decided that he would end his 15-year career if Lampre did not renew his contract.

== Major results ==
1997
5th Overall Giro di Sardegna

1st Stage 5

6th CoreStates Invitational
1998
2nd US Pro Championship
10th Brabantse Pijl
1999
5th GP Città di Camaiore
9th Overall Tour Down Under
10th Clásica de San Sebastián
10th Luk-Cup Bühl
2000
7th Gran Premio Bruno Beghelli
8th HEW Cyclassics
2002
2nd GP Industria Artigianato e Commercio Carnaghese
4th Tre Valli Varesine
8th Overall Brixia Tour
8th Trofeo Luis Puig
9th GP Città di Camaiore
2003
3rd GP Nobili Rubinetterie
5th Trofeo Laigueglia
6th G.P. Costa degli Etruschi
8th T-Mobile International
2004
4th Grand Prix of Aargau Canton
6th G.P. Costa degli Etruschi
6th T-Mobile International
2005
5th Overall Circuit de Lorraine
8th Giro del Lazio
10th GP de la Ville de Rennes
2006
9th Overall Niedersachsen-Rundfahrt
