= Brabantse Pijl (men's race) =

Belgian one-day road cycling race

Race details
- Date: mid-April
- Region: Flemish Brabant & Walloon Brabant, Belgium
- English name: Brabant Arrow
- Local name(s): Brabantse Pijl (in Dutch); La Flèche Brabançonne (in French)
- Discipline: Road
- Competition: UCI ProSeries
- Type: Single-day
- Organiser: WSC Rode Sportief Beersel
- Race director: Pascal Demol
- Web site: www.debrabantsepijl.be/en

History
- First edition: 1961
- Editions: 66 (as of 2026)
- First winner: Pino Cerami (BEL)
- Most wins: Edwig Van Hooydonck (BEL) (4 wins)
- Most recent: Anders Foldager (DEN)

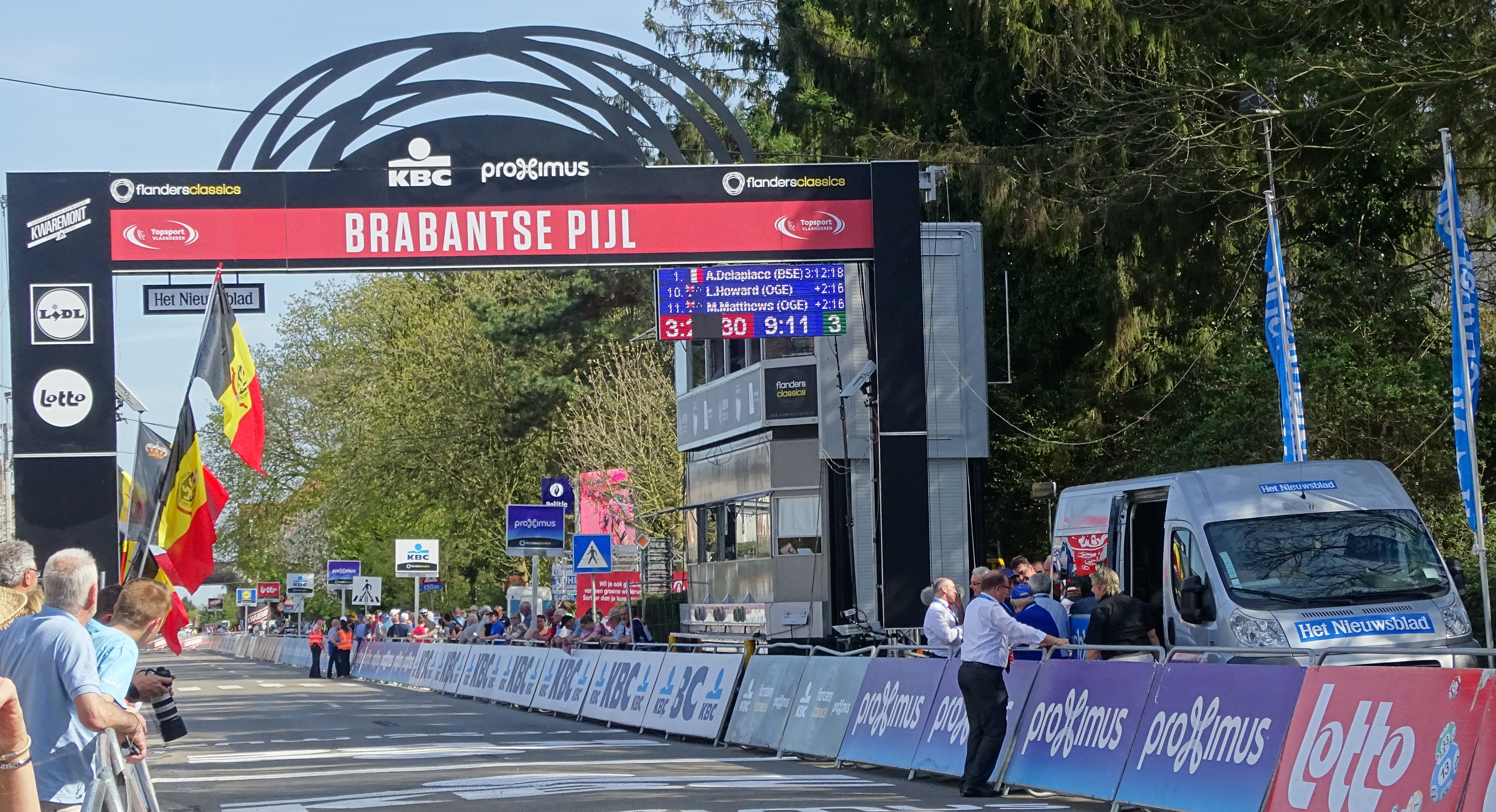
Finish in Overijse, 2015

The Brabantse Pijl (English: Brabant Arrow, French: Flèche Brabançonne or Flèche Branconne) is a Flanders Classics road bicycle race held annually in Flemish Brabant and in Walloon Brabant, Belgium. The race was organised as a 1.1 event on the UCI Europe Tour from 2005 to 2009, a 1.HC event from 2010 to 2019, and since 2020 has been part of the UCI ProSeries.

Zaventem used to be the city of start; in 2008 however, Leuven became the place of start. Until 2009, the finish was located in Alsemberg and, in 2010, it moved to Overijse. Also in 2010, the fixed date of the Brabantse Pijl shifted from the Sunday before the Tour of Flanders to the Wednesday before the Amstel Gold Race.

In 2011, the race was upgraded to a 1.HC event. Edwig Van Hooydonck holds the record for most wins in the race with four between 1987 and 1995.

== Winners ==
| Year | Country | Rider | Team |
|---|---|---|---|
| 1961 | Belgium | Pino Cerami | Peugeot–BP–Dunlop |
| 1962 | Belgium | Ludo Janssens | Solo–Van Steenbergen |
| 1963 | Belgium | Joseph Wouters | Solo-Terrot |
| 1964 | Italy | Arnaldo Pambianco | Salvarani |
| 1965 | Belgium | Willy Bocklant | Flandria–Romeo |
| 1966 | Netherlands | Jan Janssen | Pelforth–Sauvage–Lejeune |
| 1967 | Belgium | Roger Rosiers | Mann–Grundig |
| 1968 | Belgium | Victor Van Schil | Faema |
| 1969 | Belgium | Willy In't Ven | Mann–Grundig |
| 1970 | Belgium | Herman Van Springel | Mann–Grundig |
| 1971 | Belgium | Joseph Spruyt | Molteni |
| 1972 | Belgium | Eddy Merckx | Molteni |
| 1973 | Belgium | Johan De Muynck | Flandria–Carpenter–Shimano |
| 1974 | Belgium | Herman Van Springel | MIC–Ludo–De Gribaldy |
| 1975 | Belgium | Willem Peeters | Maes–Watney |
| 1976 | Belgium | Freddy Maertens | Flandria–Velda–West Vlaams Vleesbedrijf |
| 1977 | Belgium | Frans Verbeeck | IJsboerke–Colnago |
| 1978 | Belgium | Marcel Laurens | C & A |
| 1979 | Belgium | Daniel Willems | IJsboerke–Warncke |
| 1980 | Belgium | Michel Pollentier | Splendor–Admiral |
| 1981 | Belgium | Roger De Vlaeminck | DAF Trucks |
| 1982 | Belgium | Claude Criquielion | Wickes–Splendor |
| 1983 | Belgium | Eddy Planckaert | Splendor–Euroshop |
| 1984 | Belgium | Ronny Van Holen | Safir–Van de Ven |
| 1985 | Netherlands | Adri van der Poel | Kwantum–Decosol–Yoko |
| 1986 | Netherlands | Johan van der Velde | Panasonic–Merckx–Agu |
| 1987 | Belgium | Edwig Van Hooydonck | Superconfex–Kwantum–Yoko–Colnago |
| 1988 | Belgium | Johan Capiot | TVM-Van Schilt |
| 1989 | Belgium | Johan Capiot | TVM-Ragno |
| 1990 | Netherlands | Frans Maassen | Buckler–Colnago–Decca |
| 1991 | Belgium | Edwig Van Hooydonck | Buckler–Colnago–Decca |
| 1992 | Belgium | Johan Capiot | TVM–Sanyo |
| 1993 | Belgium | Edwig Van Hooydonck | WordPerfect–Colnago–Decca |
| 1994 | Italy | Michele Bartoli | Mercatone Uno–Medeghini |
| 1995 | Belgium | Edwig Van Hooydonck | Novell–Decca–Colnago |
| 1996 | Belgium | Johan Museeuw | Mapei–GB |
| 1997 | Italy | Gianluca Pianegonda | Mapei–GB |
| 1998 | Belgium | Johan Museeuw | Mapei–Bricobi |
| 1999 | Italy | Michele Bartoli | Mapei–Quick-Step |
| 2000 | Belgium | Johan Museeuw | Mapei–Quick-Step |
| 2001 | Netherlands | Michael Boogerd | Rabobank |
| 2002 | Belgium | Fabien De Waele | Mapei–Quick-Step |
| 2003 | Netherlands | Michael Boogerd | Rabobank |
| 2004 | Italy | Luca Paolini | Quick-Step–Davitamon |
| 2005 | Spain | Óscar Freire | Rabobank |
| 2006 | Spain | Óscar Freire | Rabobank |
| 2007 | Spain | Óscar Freire | Rabobank |
| 2008 | France | Sylvain Chavanel | Cofidis |
| 2009 | France | Anthony Geslin | Française des Jeux |
| 2010 | Belgium | Sébastien Rosseler | Team RadioShack |
| 2011 | Belgium | Philippe Gilbert | Omega Pharma–Lotto |
| 2012 | France | Thomas Voeckler | Team Europcar |
| 2013 | Slovakia | Peter Sagan | Cannondale |
| 2014 | Belgium | Philippe Gilbert | BMC Racing Team |
| 2015 | Belgium | Ben Hermans | BMC Racing Team |
| 2016 | Czech Republic | Petr Vakoč | Etixx–Quick-Step |
| 2017 | Italy | Sonny Colbrelli | Bahrain–Merida |
| 2018 | Belgium | Tim Wellens | Lotto–Soudal |
| 2019 | Netherlands | Mathieu van der Poel | Corendon–Circus |
| 2020 | France | Julian Alaphilippe | Deceuninck–Quick-Step |
| 2021 | Great Britain | Tom Pidcock | Ineos Grenadiers |
| 2022 | United States | Magnus Sheffield | Ineos Grenadiers |
| 2023 | France | Dorian Godon | AG2R Citroën Team |
| 2024 | France | Benoît Cosnefroy | Decathlon–AG2R La Mondiale |
| 2025 | Belgium | Remco Evenepoel | Soudal–Quick-Step |
| 2026 | Denmark | Anders Foldager | Team Jayco–AlUla |

=== Multiple winners ===
Active riders are in italics

| Wins | Rider | Nationality | Editions |
|---|---|---|---|
| 4 | Edwig Van Hooydonck | Belgium | 1987, 1991, 1993, 1995 |
| 3 | Johan Capiot | Belgium | 1988, 1989, 1992 |
| 3 | Óscar Freire | Spain | 2005, 2006, 2007 |
| 3 | Johan Museeuw | Belgium | 1996, 1998, 2000 |
| 2 | Michele Bartoli | Italy | 1994, 1999 |
| 2 | Michael Boogerd | Netherlands | 2001, 2003 |
| 2 | Philippe Gilbert | Belgium | 2011, 2014 |
| 2 | Herman Van Springel | Belgium | 1970, 1974 |

=== Wins per country ===
| Wins | Country |
|---|---|
| 39 | Belgium |
| 7 | Netherlands |
| 6 | France; Italy |
| 3 | Spain |
| 1 | Czech Republic; Denmark; Great Britain; Slovakia; United States |
