= Johan Capiot =

Belgian racing cyclist (born 1964)

Personal information
- Full name: Johan Capiot
- Born: 12 April 1964 (age 62) Rijkhoven, Belgium

Cycling career
- Sport: Cycling
- Current team: Retired
- Discipline: Road
- Role: Rider
- Rider type: Sprinter/Classics specialist

Professional teams
- 1986–1987: Roland–Van de Ven
- 1988–1994: TVM–Van Schilt
- 1995: Refin
- 1996: Collstrop–Lystex
- 1997–2000: TVM–Farm Frites

Major wins
- One-day races and classics Paris–Tours (1991) Omloop Het Volk (1990, 1992) Brabantse Pijl (1988, 1989, 1992)

Johan Capiot (born 12 April 1964) is a Belgian former professional road racing cyclist. He was a professional rider from 1986 to 2000. His son Amaury is also a professional cyclist.

== Career ==
A sprinter and hardy rider, Capiot had success in one day classic races, often in his native Belgium. Having ridden for Roland–Van de Ven he made a switch to the Dutch TVM team, led by Cees Priem, ahead of the 1988 season. However, having verbally pledged his services to both teams, the case was settled in court with a judge ruling his contract with Roland-Skala could be broken in exchange for a buyout fee. Riding for TVM, Capiot was the winner of Flèche Brabançonne in 1988 with a lone attack from 60 km out, and retained the title in 1989 by winning a sprint ahead of Adrie van der Poel and Dirk De Wolf.

Continuing with TVM, a 26 year-old Capiot was a surprise winner of the 1990 Omloop Het Volk, the first classic race in Belgium of the season. Having engineered a breakaway with 34 km to go, and recovering from a puncture with 25 km remaining, he returned to the breakaway group and proceeded won the sprint ahead of his illustrious companions Etienne De Wilde, Eddy Planckaert, Johan Museeuw and Edwig Van Hooydonck. The following year, Capiot placed second at Het Volk behind Frans Maassen. Later that year, however, he placed first from a bunch sprint at the finale of the 1991 Paris–Tours classic, winning ahead of Olaf Ludwig of Germany.

In 1992, he won Brabantse Pijl for the third time in five years, briefly the record number of victories in the race until surpassed by Van Hooydonck in the following years. That spring, he also once again won the 1992 Omloop Het Volk. He was third across the line in a bunch sprint at 1992 Gent–Wevelgem but was awarded second place behind Mario Cipollini after initial race winner Djamolidine Abdoujaparov was disqualified for an illegal racing manoeuvre in the finishing straight. That season, he placed third behind Gilbert Duclos-Lassalle and Olaf Ludwig at 1992 Paris–Roubaix.

Capiot placed fifth at the Tour of Flanders in 1994, and had sixth place finish in weather conditions described as "brutal" at the 1994 Paris–Roubaix, with fellow competitor Sean Yates seeing fit to describe Capiot as a "hard man". He placed fifth at 1995 Paris–Roubaix the following year, part of a small group riders behind the lone winner Franco Ballerini.

== Personal life ==
His son Amaury is also a professional cyclist.

== Major results ==
1986
1st Stage 3 Danmark Rundt
2nd Grote Prijs Jef Scherens
2nd GP de Denain
3rd Circuit des Frontières
3rd Paris–Brussels
3rd Omloop van de Westhoek
3rd Schaal Sels
4th Overall Tour de Luxembourg
4th Scheldeprijs
8th Brussel–Ingooigem
1987
1st Veenendaal–Veenendaal
1st Stage 1 Tour de l'Oise
2nd Brussel–Ingooigem
5th Le Samyn
6th GP de Fourmies
10th Dwars door België
1988
1st Brabantse Pijl
1st Stages 1 & 5 Tour de Luxembourg
1st Stage 1 Tour of Belgium
3rd Circuit du Tournaisis
4th Road race, National Road Championships
5th Circuit des Frontières
5th GP de Fourmies
1989
1st Brabantse Pijl
1st Grand Prix de la Libération (TTT)
4th Dwars door België
5th Paris–Brussels
5th Grote Prijs Raymond Impanis
5th Ronde van Limburg
1990
1st Omloop Het Volk
2nd Brabantse Pijl
6th Scheldeprijs
10th Omloop van de Westhoek
1991
1st Paris–Tours
1st Stage 8 Four Days of Dunkirk
2nd Rund um Köln
2nd Grote Prijs Raymond Impanis
2nd Nokere Koerse
3rd Scheldeprijs
4th Omloop van het Houtland
5th Overall Three Days of De Panne
6th Grote Prijs Jef Scherens
9th Paris–Brussels
1992
1st Brabantse Pijl
1st Omloop Het Volk
1st Le Samyn
1st Nokere Koerse
1st Ronde van Midden-Zeeland
1st Stage 2 Tour de l'Oise
2nd Gent–Wevelgem
2nd Road race, National Road Championships
3rd Paris–Roubaix
4th Overall Three Days of De Panne
5th Scheldeprijs
1993
1st Stage 3a Tour de l'Oise
1st Stage 3 Tour de Luxembourg
2nd GP de Denain
3rd Le Samyn
4th Paris–Brussels
5th Ronde van Limburg
5th Nokere Koerse
5th Omloop Het Volk
5th Dwars door België
6th Gent–Wevelgem
8th Scheldeprijs
9th Binche–Tournai–Binche
10th Tour of Flanders
1994
1st Le Samyn
1st Clásica de Almería
2nd Kuurne–Brussels–Kuurne
5th Tour of Flanders
6th Paris–Roubaix
9th Omloop Het Volk
10th Overall Four Days of Dunkirk
1995
1st Le Samyn
3rd Coca-Cola Trophy
5th Paris–Roubaix
5th Paris–Tours
7th Grote Prijs Jef Scherens
8th Paris–Brussels
9th Nokere Koerse
1996
1st A Travers le Morbihan
1st Omloop van het Houtland
1st CoreStates Classic
1st Hasselt–Spa–Hasselt
3rd Rund um Köln
3rd Ronde van Midden-Zeeland
3rd Veenendaal–Veenendaal
4th Druivenkoers-Overijse
5th Paris–Brussels
8th Gent–Wevelgem
8th Tour de Vendée
9th Omloop Het Volk
9th GP de Fourmies
9th Grote Prijs Jef Scherens
1997
3rd Gent–Wevelgem
3rd Omloop Het Volk
9th Kuurne–Brussels–Kuurne
1998
1st Stage 5 Vuelta a Murcia
2nd Dwars door België
8th Delta Profronde
1999
10th Nokere Koerse
