= 1992 Paris–Roubaix =

Race details
- Dates: 12 April 1992
- Stages: 1
- Distance: 267 km (165.9 mi)
- Winning time: 6h 26' 56"

Results
| | Winner | Gilbert Duclos-Lassalle (FRA) | (Z) |
| | Second | Olaf Ludwig (GER) | (Panasonic-Sportlife) |
| | Third | Johan Capiot (BEL) | (TVM–Sanyo) |

The 1992 Paris–Roubaix was the 90th running of the Paris–Roubaix single-day cycling race. It was held on 12 April 1992 over a distance of 267 kilometres (165.9 miles).

== Results ==
| # | Name | Team | Time |
|---|---|---|---|
| 1 | Gilbert Duclos-Lassalle (FRA) | Z | 6h 26' 56" |
| 2 | Olaf Ludwig (GER) | Panasonic–Sportlife | 34" |
| 3 | Johan Capiot (BEL) | TVM–Sanyo | 1' 22" |
| 4 | Peter Pieters (NED) | Tulip Computers | 1' 22" |
| 5 | Jean-Claude Colotti (FRA) | Z | 1' 22" |
| 6 | Etienne De Wilde (BEL) | Team Telekom | 1' 22" |
| 7 | Johan Museeuw (BEL) | Lotto–Mavic–MBK | 1' 22" |
| 8 | Nico Verhoeven (NED) | PDM–Ultima–Concorde | 1' 22" |
| 9 | Greg LeMond (USA) | Z | 1' 22" |
| 10 | Hendrik Redant (BEL) | Lotto–Mavic–MBK | 1' 22" |
