= Leen de Groot =

Dutch cyclist (born 1946)

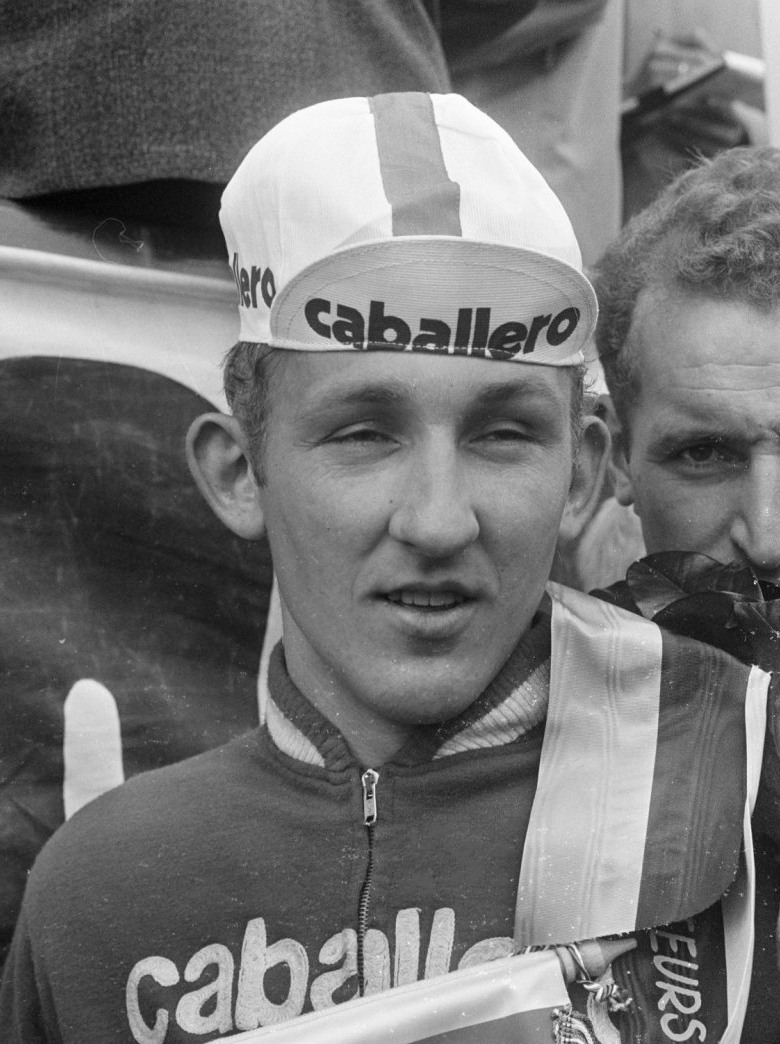
- Leen de Groot in 1968

Personal information
- Born: 16 April 1946 (age 80) Utrecht, the Netherlands

Sport
- Sport: Cycling

Leen de Groot (born 16 April 1946) is a retired Dutch cyclist who was active between 1964 and 1969. He won the Ronde van Drenthe and Delta Profronde in 1967 and the Olympia's Tour in 1968.
