= Delta Profronde =

Race details
- Date: Mid June
- Region: Zeeland, Netherlands
- Local name(s): Delta Profronde (in Dutch)
- Discipline: Road
- Competition: UCI Europe Tour
- Type: One-day race

History
- First edition: 1959
- Editions: 47 (as of 2007)
- First winner: Miel Verstraete (NED)
- Most recent: Denis Flahaut (FRA)

Delta Profronde was a single-day road bicycle race held annually in June in Zeeland, Netherlands. In 2005, the race was organized as a 1.1 event on the UCI Europe Tour. It was previously known as Ronde van Midden-Zeeland and it was an amateur race between 1959 and 1973. In 2008, the organizers of the Delta Profronde and of the OZ Wielerweekend operated a fusion to create the stage race Delta Tour Zeeland.

== Winners ==
Year	Country	Rider	Team
1959	Netherlands	Miel Verstraete	
1960	Netherlands	Cees van Amsterdam	
1961	Netherlands	Bart Solaro	
1962	Netherlands	Cees Snepvangers	
1963	Netherlands	Leo van Dongen	
1965	Netherlands	Dies Kosten	
1966	Netherlands	Rini Wagtmans	
1967	Netherlands	Leen de Groot	
1968	Netherlands	Joop Zoetemelk	
1969	Netherlands	Henk Benjamin	
1970	Netherlands	Cees Priem	
1971	Netherlands	Marcel Pennings	
1972	Netherlands	Roy Schuiten	
1973	Netherlands	Peer Maas	
1974	Netherlands	Tino Tabak	
1975	Netherlands	Gerard Vianen	
1976	Netherlands	Fedor den Hertog	
1977	Belgium	Freddy Maertens	
1978	Netherlands	Gerrie Knetemann	
1979	Netherlands	Bert Oosterbosch	
1980	Netherlands	Gerrie Knetemann	
1981	Belgium	Eddy Planckaert	
1982	Netherlands	Henk Lubberding	
1983	Netherlands	Jan Raas	
1984	Belgium	Luc Colijn	
1985	Belgium	Ferdinand Van den Haute	
1986	Netherlands	Gerrit Solleveld	
1987	Netherlands	Jean-Paul Van Poppel	
1988	Netherlands	Peter Pieters	
1989	Netherlands	Jelle Nijdam	
1990	Netherlands	Gerrit Solleveld	
1991	Netherlands	Wiebren Veenstra	
1992	Belgium	Johan Capiot	
1993	Belgium	Jo Planckaert	
1994	Netherlands	Maarten Den Bakker	
1995	Netherlands	Jeroen Blijlevens	
1996	Netherlands	Jelle Nijdam	
1997	No race		
1998	Germany	Erik Zabel	
1999	Netherlands	Servais Knaven	
2000	Netherlands	Leon van Bon	
2001	Belgium	Niko Eeckhout	
2002	Australia	Robbie McEwen	
2003	Netherlands	Stefan Van Dijck	
2004	Belgium	Niko Eeckhout	
2005	Netherlands	Bram De Groot	
2006	Netherlands	Steven De Jongh	
2007	France	Denis Flahaut	
