= Patrick Onnockx =

Belgian cyclist

Personal information
- Born: 15 July 1959 (age 67) Halle, Belgium

Cycling career
- Sport: Cycling
- Discipline: Road
- Role: Rider

Professional teams
- 1982–1983: Beckers Snacks–Zeisner–Polyfoon
- 1984: Europ Decor–Boule d'Or
- 1985–1986: Lotto
- 1987–1989: AD Renting–Fangio–IOC–MBK

Patrick Onnockx (born 15 July 1959) is a Belgian former professional racing cyclist. He rode in two editions of the Tour de France.

== Major results ==
1980
3rd Seraing–Aachen–Seraing
1982
10th Le Samyn
1983
3rd Druivenkoers-Overijse
6th Grote Prijs Jef Scherens
1984
5th Grote Prijs Jef Scherens
1985
8th GP de Fourmies
6th Le Samyn
7th Brabantse Pijl
1986
1st Le Samyn
2nd Druivenkoers-Overijse
6th Ronde van Limburg
1987
2nd Le Samyn
4th Brabantse Pijl
8th Druivenkoers-Overijse
1988
1st Grand Prix de Cholet-Mauléon-Moulins
10th Paris–Brussels
10th Grand Prix Cerami
10th Druivenkoers-Overijse
