= 1990 Omloop Het Volk =

Race details
- Dates: 3 March 1990
- Stages: 1
- Distance: 198 km (123 mi)
- Winning time: 5h 25' 00"

Results
	Winner	Johan Capiot (BEL)
	Second	Edwig Van Hooydonck (BEL)
	Third	Etienne De Wilde (BEL)

The 1990 Omloop Het Volk was the 44th edition of the Omloop Het Volk cycle race and was held on 3 March 1990. The race started and finished in Sint-Amandsberg. The race was won by Johan Capiot.

== General classification ==
Final general classification
Rank	Rider	Time
1	Johan Capiot (BEL)	5h 25' 00"
2	Edwig Van Hooydonck (BEL)	+ 0"
3	Etienne De Wilde (BEL)	+ 0"
4	Johan Museeuw (BEL)	+ 0"
5	Eddy Planckaert (BEL)	+ 0"
6	Johan Lammerts (NED)	+ 0"
7	Adri van der Poel (NED)	+ 0"
8	Eric Vanderaerden (BEL)	+ 55"
9	Brian Holm (DEN)	+ 55"
10	Carlo Bomans (BEL)	+ 55"
