= Benny Van Brabant =

Belgian cyclist

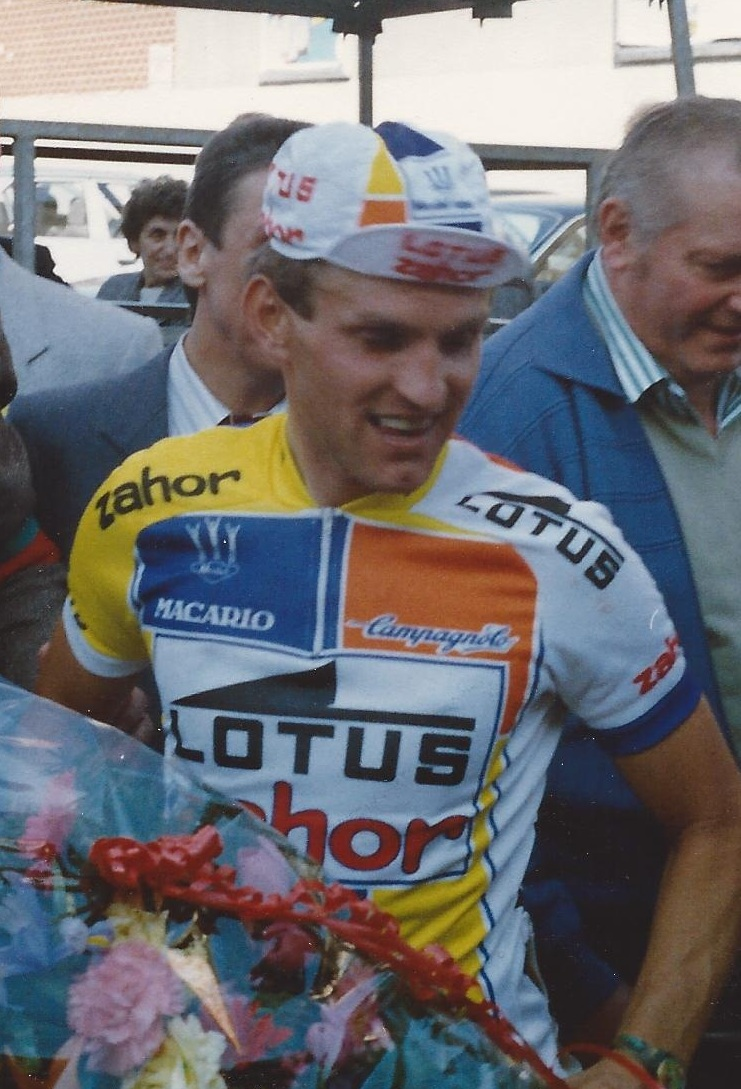
- Benny Van Brabant in 1989

Personal information
- Born: 8 May 1959 (age 67) Hasselt, Belgium

Cycling career
- Sport: Cycling
- Discipline: Road
- Role: Rider

Professional teams
- 1981: Eurobouw–Rossin
- 1982–1983: Splendor–Wickes Bouwmarkt
- 1984–1985: Tönissteiner–Lotto–Mavic
- 1986: Dormilón
- 1987: Selca
- 1988–1989: Zahor Chocolates
- 1990: Isoglass–Garden Wood
- 1991: S.E.F.B.–Saxon–Gan
- 1992: La William–Duvel

Benny Van Brabant (born 8 May 1959) is a Belgian former professional racing cyclist. He rode in three editions of the Tour de France, two editions of the Giro d'Italia and six editions of the Vuelta a España.

== Career achievements ==
=== Major results ===
1981
1st Omloop van het Zuidwesten
5th Brussels–Ingooigem
7th Overall Tour de Luxembourg
1982
1st Stage 4b Ronde van Nederland
4th Omloop Het Volk
8th Grand Prix de Wallonie
1983
7th Grand Prix de Wallonie
9th Rund um den Henninger Turm
1984
1st Binche–Tournai–Binche
Tour de l'Avenir

1st Points classification
1st Stages 2 & 6

1st Stage 1b Critérium du Dauphiné Libéré
6th National Road Race Championships
8th Trofeo Laigueglia
1985
1st Stages 3 & 7a Critérium du Dauphiné Libéré
1st Stages 2 & 3 Tour de Picardie
6th Druivenkoers-Overijse
8th De Brabantse Pijl
8th Le Samyn
1986
1st Stages 1, 3 & 4b Vuelta a Murcia
1st Stage 2b Vuelta a Burgos
9th Overall Vuelta a Andalucía

1st Stage 5a

1987
3rd Nice–Alassio
1989
1st Stage 4 Vuelta a Castilla y León
1st Stage 5 Volta a Portugal
9th Overall Vuelta a Andalucía
1990
1st Stage 7 Vuelta a España
3rd Overall Vuelta a Aragón
1991
2nd Tour du Nord-Ouest
4th Le Samyn
5th Dwars door België
5th De Brabantse Pijl
7th Paris–Brussels
7th Scheldeprijs
8th Grand Prix de Wallonie
1992
1st Stage 3 Circuit Cycliste Sarthe
6th De Brabantse Pijl
8th Le Samyn
8th Binche–Tournai–Binche
9th Scheldeprijs

=== Grand Tour general classification results timeline ===
Grand Tour	1982	1983	1984	1985	1986	1987	1988	1989	1990
Giro d'Italia	—	—	—	—	—	68	DNF	—	—
Tour de France	118	DNF	—	129	—	—	—	—	—
Vuelta a España	24	—	66	—	86	—	54	64	83
