= Yves Godimus =

Belgian cyclist

Personal information
- Born: 12 January 1960 (age 66) Lobbes, Belgium

Cycling career
- Sport: Cycling
- Discipline: Road
- Role: Rider

Professional teams
- 1983–1984: Fangio–Tönissteiner–OM Trucks–Mavic
- 1985: Lotto
- 1986: Sigma
- 1987: S.E.F.B
- 1988: Boccaccio Life–Fondua
- 1989: Superconfex–Yoko–Opel–Colnago
- 1990–1992: La William–Saltos

Yves Godimus (born 12 January 1960) is a Belgian former professional racing cyclist. He rode in the 1985 Tour de France. He most notably won the Grand Prix de Denain in 1984.

== Major results ==
1982
3rd Circuit de Wallonie
1983
2nd Grand Prix d'Aix-en-Provence
7th Le Samyn
1984
1st Grand Prix de Denain
2nd Binche–Tournai–Binche
8th Grand Prix de Wallonie
10th Le Samyn
1985
4th Circuit des Frontières
6th Binche–Tournai–Binche
9th Grote Prijs Jef Scherens
9th Grand Prix Cerami
1986
1st Tour de la Haute-Sambre
2nd Binche–Tournai–Binche
3rd Grand Prix Impanis-Van Petegem
1988
2nd Nokere Koerse
3rd Binche–Tournai–Binche
1990
4th Brussels–Ingooigem
7th Binche–Tournai–Binche
10th Omloop van de Vlaamse Scheldeboorden
1991
8th Binche–Tournai–Binche
