= 1989 Paris–Roubaix =

1989 UCI Road World Cup, race 3 of 12

Race details
- Dates: 9 April 1989
- Stages: 1
- Distance: 265 km (164.7 mi)
- Winning time: 6h 46' 45"

Results
	Winner	Jean-Marie Wampers (BEL)	(Panasonic–Isostar–Colnago–Agu)
	Second	Dirk De Wolf (BEL)	(Hitachi)
	Third	Edwig Van Hooydonck (BEL)	(Superconfex–Yoko–Opel–Colnago)

The 1989 Paris–Roubaix was the 87th edition of the Paris–Roubaix cycle race and was held on 9 April 1989. The race started in Compiègne and finished in Roubaix. The race was won by Jean-Marie Wampers of the Panasonic team.

== General classification ==
Final general classification

Rank	Rider	Team	Time
1	Jean-Marie Wampers (BEL)	Panasonic–Isostar–Colnago–Agu	6h 46' 45"
2	Dirk De Wolf (BEL)	Hitachi	+ 0"
3	Edwig Van Hooydonck (BEL)	Superconfex–Yoko–Opel–Colnago	+ 59"
4	Gilbert Duclos-Lassalle (FRA)	Z–Peugeot	+ 59"
5	Eddy Planckaert (BEL)	AD Renting–W-Cup–Bottecchia	+ 59"
6	Marc Madiot (FRA)	Toshiba	+ 59"
7	Herman Frison (BEL)	Histor–Sigma	+ 4' 27"
8	Jacques Hanegraaf (NED)	TVM–Ragno	+ 4' 27"
9	Urs Freuler (SUI)	Panasonic–Isostar–Colnago–Agu	+ 4' 27"
10	Johan Lammerts (NED)	AD Renting–W-Cup–Bottecchia	+ 4' 27"
