= 1984 Tour of Flanders =

68th Tour of Flanders
Race details
- Dates: 1 April 1984
- Stages: 1
- Distance: 268 km (166.5 mi)
- Winning time: 6h 45' 47"

Results
	Winner	Johan Lammerts (NED)	(Panasonic–Raleigh)
	Second	Sean Kelly (IRL)	(Skil–Sem–Mavic)
	Third	Jean-Luc Vandenbroucke (BEL)	(La Redoute)

The 68th running of the Tour of Flanders cycling classic was held on Sunday, 1 April 1984. Dutch rider Johan Lammerts won the monument race in his first attempt, following a late escape from a six-man group. Ireland's Sean Kelly won the sprint for second place at 25 seconds. 40 of 181 riders finished.

== Route ==
The race started in Sint Niklaas and finished in Meerbeke (Ninove) – covering 268 km. There were 12 categorized climbs:

- Oude Kwaremont
- Koppenberg
- Taaienberg
- Berg Ten Houte
- Eikenberg
- Volkegemberg
- Varent
- Leberg
- Molenberg
- Berendries
- Muur van Geraardsbergen
- Bosberg

== Results ==
Result
Rank	Rider	Team	Time
1	Johan Lammerts (NED)	Panasonic–Raleigh	6h 45' 47"
2	Sean Kelly (IRL)	Skil–Sem–Mavic	+ 25"
3	Jean-Luc Vandenbroucke (BEL)	La Redoute	s.t.
4	Jean-Philippe Vandenbrande (BEL)	Splendor–Mondial–Marc	s.t.
5	Rudy Matthijs (BEL)	Splendor–Mondial–Marc	s.t.
6	Ludo De Keulenaer (BEL)	Panasonic–Raleigh	s.t.
7	Gregor Braun (FRG)	La Redoute	+ 44"
8	Luc Colijn (BEL)	Safir–Van de Ven–Colnago	+ 49"
9	Rudy Rogiers (BEL)	Splendor-Mondial–Marc	s.t.
10	Eric Vanderaerden (BEL)	Panasonic–Raleigh	s.t.
