= Paul Haghedooren =

Belgian cyclist (1959–1997)

- Haghedooren in 1985

Personal information
- Born: 11 October 1959 Kortrijk, Belgium
- Died: 9 November 1997 (aged 38) Heist-aan-Zee, Belgium

Cycling career
- Sport: Cycling
- Discipline: Road
- Role: Rider

Professional teams
- 1982: Capri Sonne–Campagnolo–Merckx
- 1983: Splendor–Euro Shop
- 1984: Europ Decor–Boule d'Or
- 1985–1986: Lotto
- 1987–1990: Sigma–Fina
- 1991: S.E.F.B.–Saxon–Gan
- 1992–1994: Collstrop–Garden Wood

Paul Haghedooren (11 October 1959 – 9 November 1997) was a Belgian cyclist. He rode in five editions of the Tour de France and two editions of the Vuelta a España.

== Career achievements ==
=== Major results ===
1979
3rd Circuit de Wallonie
1980
1st Circuit de Wallonie
3rd Ronde van Vlaanderen Beloften
1981
3rd Overall Giro della Valle d'Aosta
6th Ronde van Vlaanderen Beloften
1982
2nd GP de Fourmies
2nd Overall Deutschland Tour
3rd La Flèche Wallonne
10th Giro dell'Emilia
1983
2nd Tour du Hainaut Occidentale
6th Tour of Flanders
7th Overall Paris–Nice
1984
3rd De Brabantse Pijl
8th Kampioenschap van Vlaanderen
9th Overall Ronde van Nederland
10th Kuurne–Brussels–Kuurne
1985
1st National Road Race Championships
1st Grand Prix Cerami
2nd Le Samyn
3rd Grand Prix d'Ouverture La Marseillaise
4th GP Eddy Merckx
7th Dwars door België
9th De Brabantse Pijl
9th Kuurne–Brussels–Kuurne
1986
7th Circuit des Frontières
1987
1st Grand Prix Raymond Impanis
2nd Omloop van het Houtland
2nd Binche–Tournai–Binche
5th Circuit des Frontières
7th Grand Prix de Wallonie
8th Overall Tour of Britain

1st Stage 4

1988
7th Overall Tour du Limousin
7th Overall Setmana Catalana de Ciclisme
1989
3rd Grand Prix de la Libération (TTT)
4th National Road Race Championships
1990
5th De Brabantse Pijl
6th Overall Tour Méditerranéen
10th Nokere Koerse
1991
1st Stage 2 Paris–Bourges
1st Stage 3 Four Days of Dunkirk
1992
1st Nationale Sluitingprijs
2nd De Brabantse Pijl
3rd Binche–Tournai–Binche
1993
1st Stage 6 Four Days of Dunkirk
3rd Grand Prix d'Isbergues
3rd Binche–Tournai–Binche
3rd La Côte Picarde
6th Overall Route du Sud
10th Druivenkoers Overijse
1994
4th Tour de Vendée
1995
1st Stage 3 Tour de Namur
1996
1st Stage 3 Le Triptyque des Monts et Châteaux
