= Noël Segers =

Belgian cyclist

Personal information
- Born: 21 December 1959 (age 66) Ninove, Belgium

Cycling career
- Sport: Cycling
- Role: Rider

Noël Segers (born 21 December 1959) is a former Belgian racing cyclist. He rode in four editions of the Tour de France between 1983 and 1992 and the 1987 Vuelta a España.
