= Jan Wijnants (cyclist) =

Belgian cyclist

Personal information
- Born: 8 September 1958 (age 68) Antwerp, Belgium

Cycling career
- Sport: Cycling

Jan Wijnants (born 8 September 1958) is a Belgian former cyclist. He competed in the individual road race event at the 1980 Summer Olympics.
