= Wiebren Veenstra =

Dutch cyclist

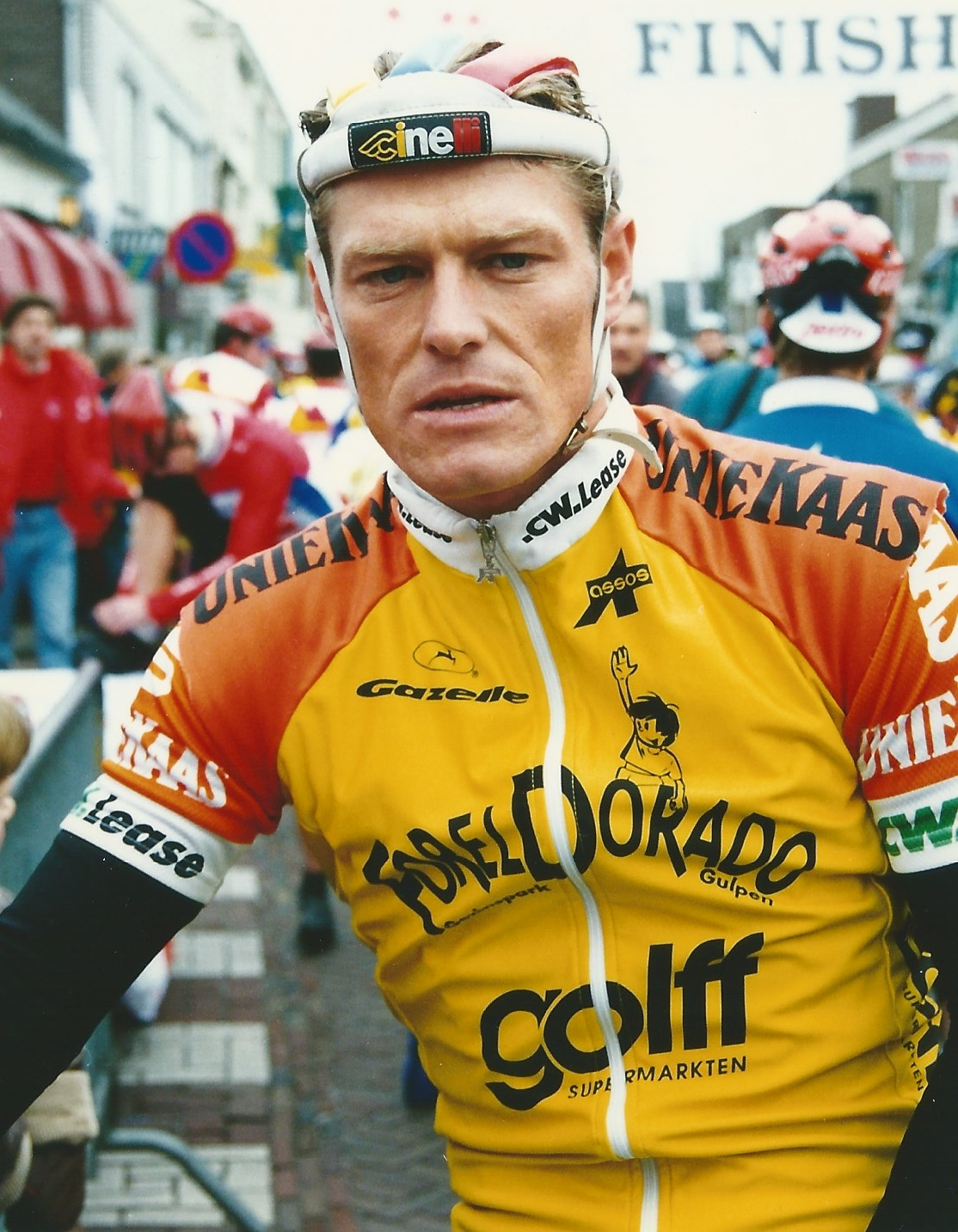
- 1996

Personal information
- Born: 8 December 1966 (age 59) Harkema, Netherlands

Cycling career
- Sport: Cycling
- Role: Rider

Wiebren Veenstra (born 8 December 1966) is a Dutch former professional racing cyclist. He rode in two editions of the Tour de France.
