= Peter Pieters =

Dutch cyclist (born 1962)

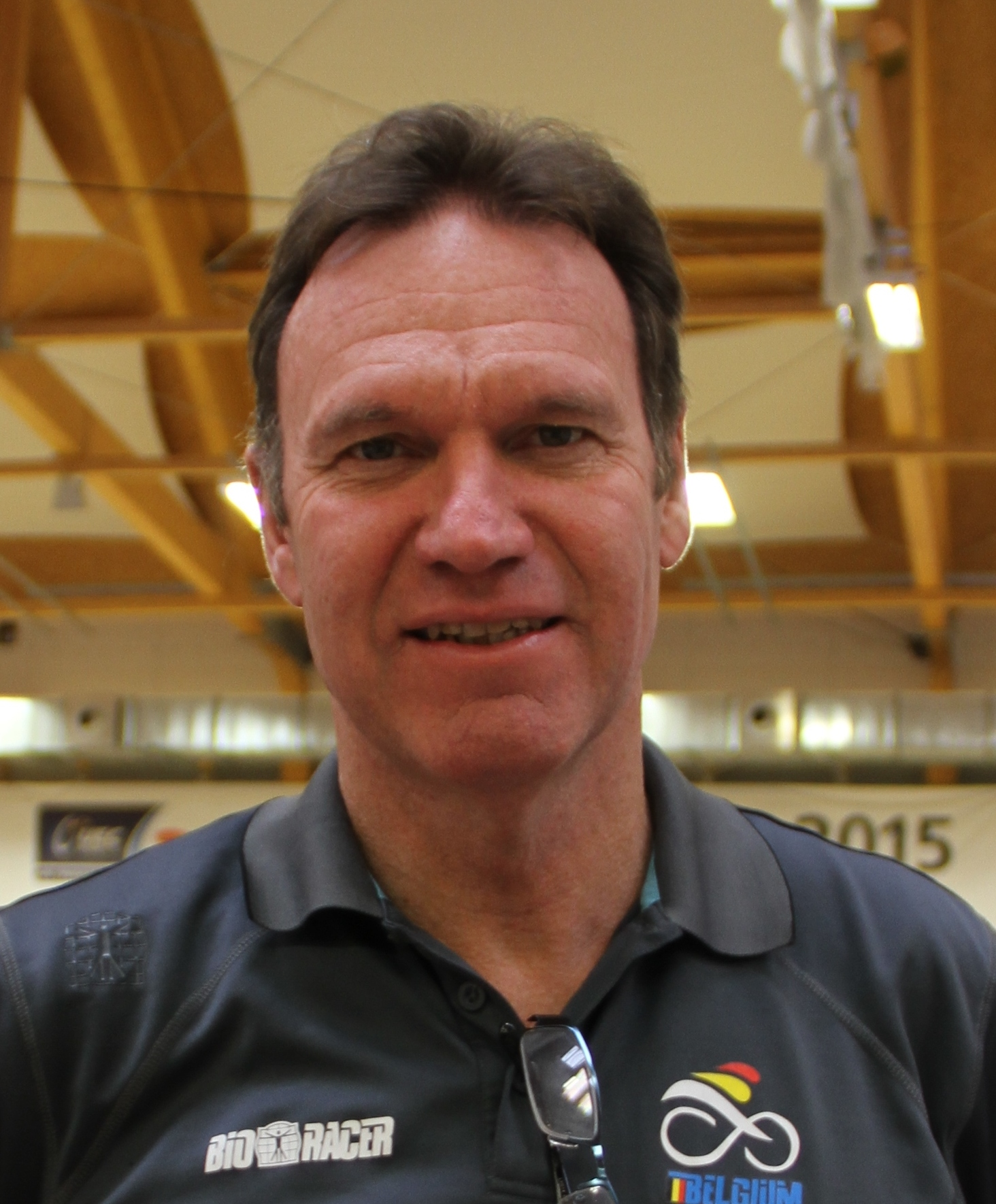
- Peter Pieters in 2015

Personal information
- Born: 2 February 1962 (age 64) Zwanenburg, the Netherlands
- Height: 1.91 m (6 ft 3 in)
- Weight: 82 kg (181 lb)

Sport
- Sport: Cycling
Medal record
Representing the Netherlands
UCI Track Cycling World Championships
Bronze medal – third place	1991 Stuttgart	Points race
UEC European Track Championships
Gold medal – first place	1995	Omnium

Peter Pieters (born 2 February 1962) is a retired Dutch cyclist who was active between 1980 and 1998. On track, he competed at the 1996 Summer Olympics in the individual 4 km pursuit and points race, and won a bronze medal in the points race at the 1991 world championships. On the road, he won the Delta Profronde (1988), Paris–Tours (1988), Profronde van Almelo (1990) and Ronde van de Haarlemmermeer (1996), as well as individual stages of the Olympia's Tour (1983), Vuelta a Burgos (1984), Driedaagse van West-Vlaanderen (1984), Vuelta a Murcia (1985), Tour of Belgium (1988) and Tour of Sweden (1992). After retiring from competition he worked as a cycling coach, in particular he was successful with the Belgian national team: in 2017 the Belgium national team brought home the highest number of medals in 50 years.

Pieters's brother Sjaak and daughter Amy are also Olympic cyclists.

== See also ==
- List of Dutch Olympic cyclists

Sporting positions
Preceded by Adri van der Poel	Dutch National Road Race Champion; 1987	Succeeded by Frans Maassen
