= Alsemberg =

Town in Beersel, Belgium

Coordinates: 50.743333°N 4.336111°E

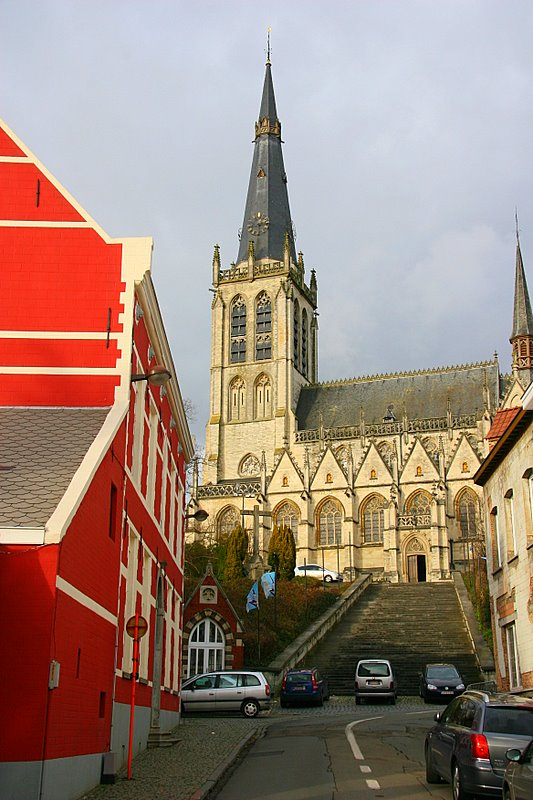
View on the Church of Our Lady (Alsemberg)

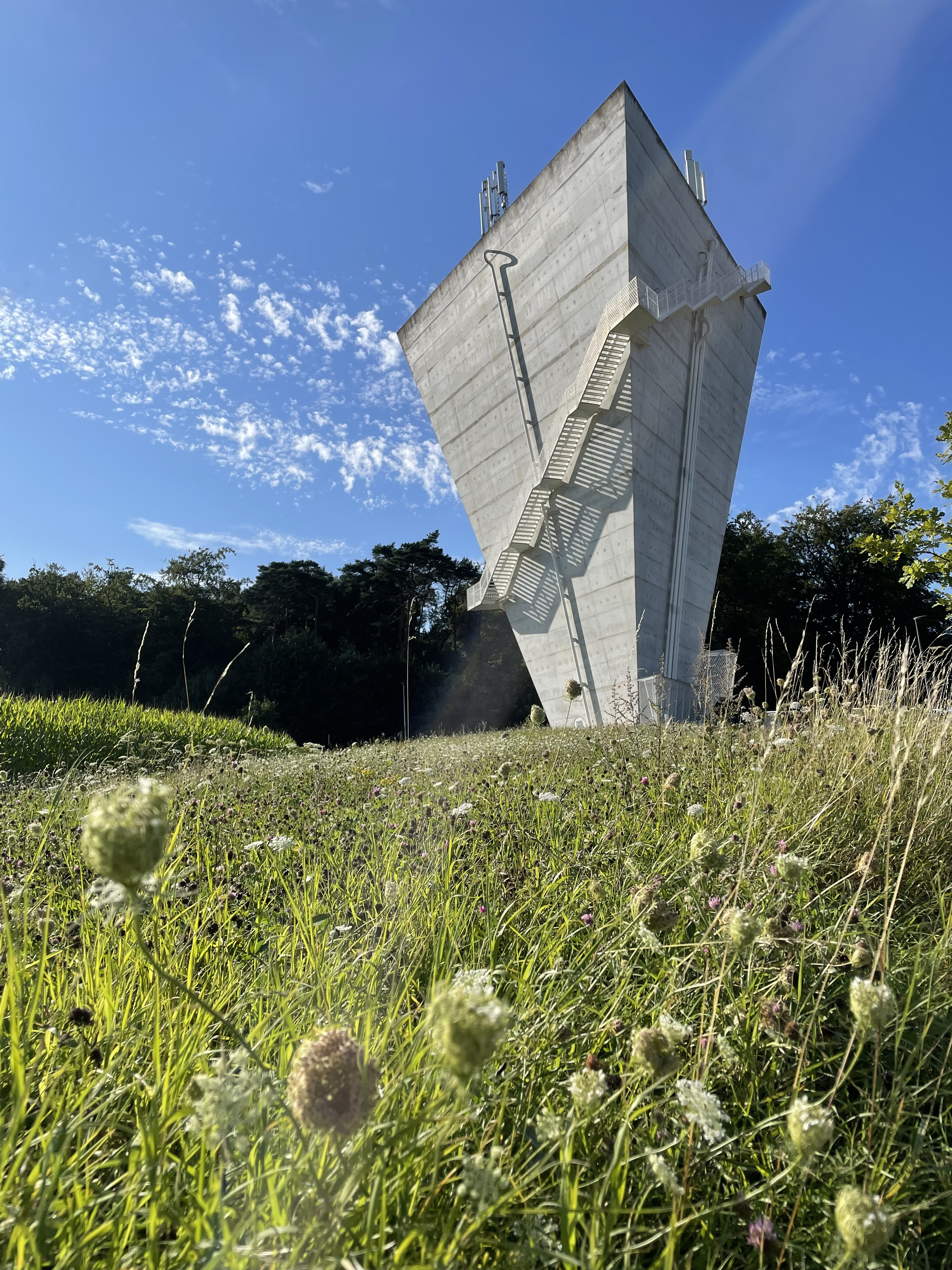
The Alsemberg Water Silo, Belgium's first water silo.

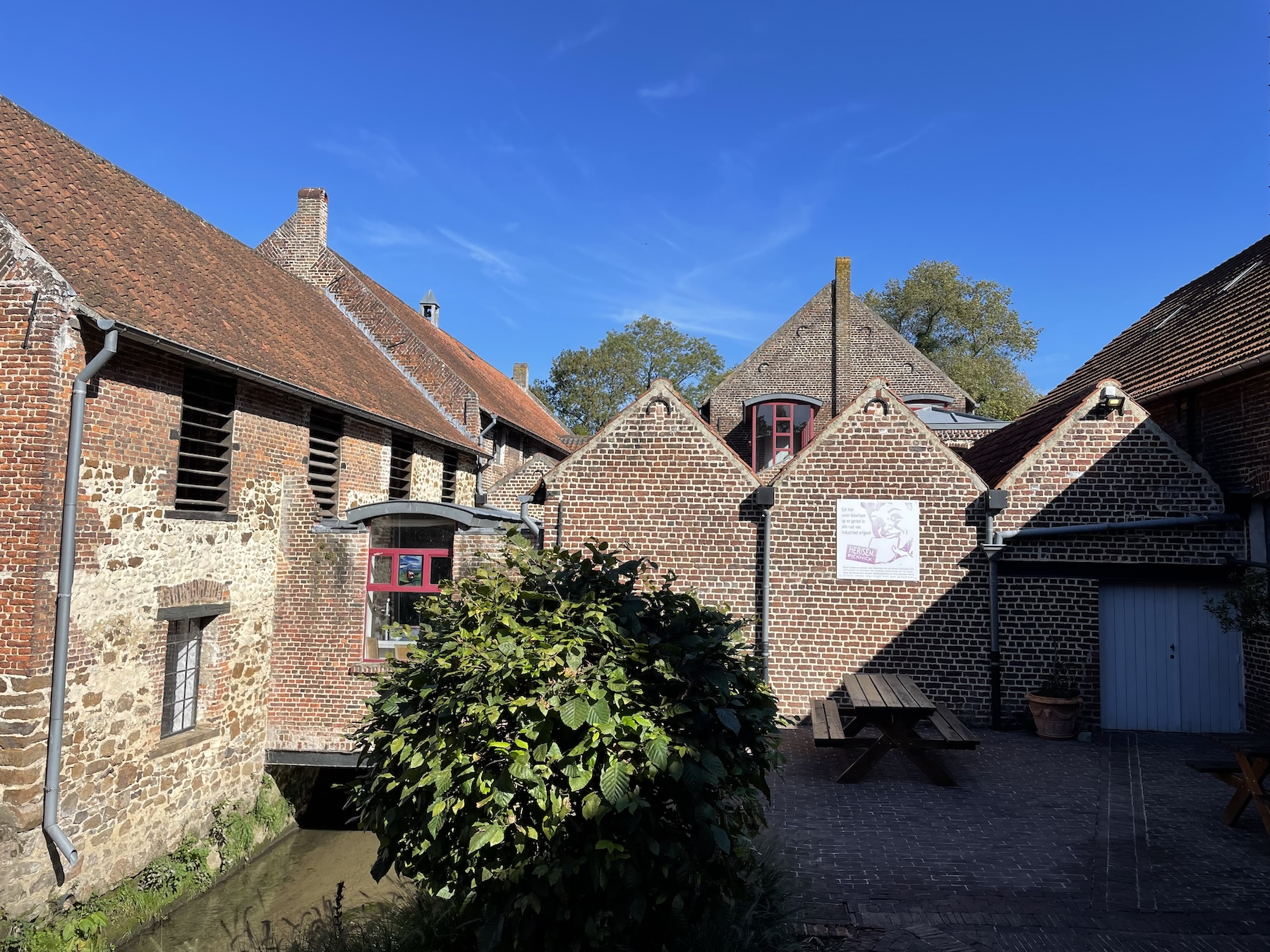
The Herisem Paper mill, former cardboard factory of the Winderickx family, that grew out of an old 16th-century paper mill.

Alsemberg is a rural town with about 5,300 inhabitants in the municipality of Beersel, in the province of Flemish Brabant, Belgium, situated south of Brussels.

The name of the town combines 'Alsem', the Artemisia plant, and 'Berg', meaning 'mountain'.

The official language is Dutch (as everywhere in Flanders). Located close to Brussels, to Wallonia and the municipality with linguistic facilities of Sint-Genesius-Rode, Alsemberg is home to a minority of French-speakers.

Notable features in Alsemberg include the Herisem Paper Mill and the Visitor centre 'De Lambiek' where tourists are able to find information, shop and experience beer tasting, in honour of the traditional special Lambic beers, typical for the region. Biking and walking in the city are also notable tourist attractions.

The Herisem Paper Mill

This mill is a 19th-century industrial complex that evolved from an old paper mill established in 1536. It is a well-preserved example of the once-thriving paper and cardboard industry in the Flemish Brabant region. Today, it is a recognized protected industrial heritage site, acknowledged by the European Commission as a model project for the preservation of architectural heritage in Belgium. It includes the original paper mill, cardboard factory, associated farm (with grain mill), and a centrally located residence with a former office.

The site is situated amidst 16 hectares of meadows, fields, and woodlands in the Molenbeek valley. The Herisem Mill has received awards for its preservation efforts, including the monument conservation prize in 2000 and the Tourism Award for Heritage Tourism from the Province of Flemish Brabant in 2018. The water wheels and restored Bollinckx steam engine still drive the 19th-century machinery, offering visitors a unique glimpse into the region's industrial past.

The first Belgian Water Silo

Alsemberg is home to Belgium's first water silo, designed by BEL Architects for the water company Farys. The structure has been featured in The Guardian and the book Celebrating Public Architecture.

The striking structure plays a key role in the drinking water supply of the region. It replaces the old water tower and several underground reservoirs in the area. Unlike a classic water tower that is a pedestal with a water tank on top, the water silo has the shape of an inverted pyramid and is filled with water from bottom to top. The largest amount of water is stored at the top, to maintain constant pressure on the user side. At 31 meters, the water silo has a five times larger capacity, up to 2500 m^{3} of water, instead of 500 m^{3} previously. This increased volume allowed for a transition from 2 water towers and 4 reservoirs to 1 water silo combined with 1 remaining reservoir.

The water silo is a simple conical volume, without unnecessary hollow space inside. Pipes, installations, and stairs are located on the exterior, as if decorating the structure, while increasing social control and the readability of the water silo. The construction in reinforced concrete is an architectural success, because of its unique shape and the pressure load from the stored drinking water, mounting to 6,600 tons when filled. The hexagonal floor slab is reinforced with 310 kg/m^{3}, the walls with 256 kg/m^{3}. Because the water pressure is highest at the bottom of the silo, the concrete walls there are as thick as 70 cm. On the inside, the concrete walls are lined with a special waterproof membrane. The structure was realized in on-site poured reinforced exposed concrete. Due to the triangular section and the slight angle of the facade, a climbing formwork was chosen.
