= 1979 Tour of Flanders =

63rd Tour of Flanders
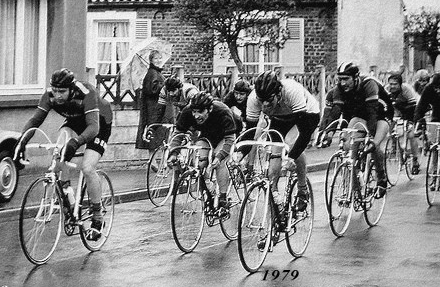

Race details
- Dates: 1 April 1979
- Stages: 1
- Distance: 267 km (165.9 mi)
- Winning time: 6h 31'

Results
	Winner	Jan Raas (NED)	(TI–Raleigh–McGregor)
	Second	Marc Demeyer (BEL)	(Flandria–Ça va seul)
	Third	Daniel Willems (BEL)	(IJsboerke–Warncke)

The 63rd Tour of Flanders cycling classic was held on Sunday, 1 April 1979. The race was won by Dutch rider Jan Raas in Meerbeke after a 15 km solo attack. 34 of 180 riders finished.

== Route ==
The race started in Sint Niklaas and finished in Meerbeke (Ninove) – covering 267 km. There were nine categorized climbs:

- Oude Kwaremont
- Koppenberg
- Taaienberg
- Eikenberg
- Volkegemberg
- Boigneberg
- Steenberg
- Muur van Geraardsbergen
- Bosberg

== Results ==
Result
Rank	Rider	Team	Time
1	Jan Raas (NED)	TI–Raleigh–McGregor	6h 31' 00"
2	Marc Demeyer (BEL)	Flandria–Ça va seul	+ 1' 04"
3	Daniel Willems (BEL)	IJsboerke–Warncke	+ 1' 15"
4	Marc Renier (BEL)	KAS–Campagnolo	s.t.
5	Piet van Katwijk (NED)	TI–Raleigh–McGregor	s.t.
6	Jos Schipper (NED)	Zeepcentrale Marc	s.t.
7	Hennie Kuiper (NED)	Peugeot–Esso–Michelin	s.t.
8	Walter Godefroot (BEL)	IJsboerke–Warncke	s.t.
9	Guido Van Calster (BEL)	DAF Trucks	+ 1' 20"
10	Joop Zoetemelk (NED)	Miko–Mercier	+ 1' 25"
