= 1981 Tour of Flanders =

65th Tour of Flanders
Race details
- Dates: 5 April 1981
- Stages: 1
- Distance: 267 km (165.9 mi)
- Winning time: 6h 32' 37"

Results
	Winner	Hennie Kuiper (NED)	(Daf Trucks–Cote d'Or–Gazelle)
	Second	Frits Pirard (NED)	(Boule d'Or–Sunair–Colnago)
	Third	Jan Raas (NED)	(TI–Raleigh–Creda)

The 65th running of the Tour of Flanders cycling classic was held on Sunday, 5 April 1981. Dutch rider Hennie Kuiper claimed a solo victory ahead of his fellow Dutchmen Frits Pirard and Jan Raas. 45 of 184 riders finished.

== Route ==
The race started in Sint Niklaas and finished in Meerbeke (Ninove) – covering 267 km. There were 11 categorized climbs:

- Oude Kwaremont
- Koppenberg
- Taaienberg
- Eikenberg
- Volkegemberg
- Varent
- Steenberg
- Pijpketel
- Muur van Geraardsbergen
- Bosberg
- Nellekensberg

== Results ==
Result
Rank	Rider	Team	Time
1	Hennie Kuiper (NED)	Daf Trucks–Cote d'Or–Gazelle	6h 32' 37"
2	Frits Pirard (NED)	Boule d'Or–Sunair–Colnago	+ 1' 03"
3	Jan Raas (NED)	TI–Raleigh–Creda	+ 1' 06"
4	Jacques Bossis (FRA)	Peugeot–Esso–Michelin	s.t.
5	Jean-Luc Vandenbroucke (BEL)	La Redoute–Motobecane	s.t.
6	Roger De Vlaeminck (BEL)	Daf Trucks–Cote d'Or–Gazelle	+ 1' 13"
7	Fons De Wolf (BEL)	Vermeer Thijs–Mimo Salons–Gios	s.t.
8	Sean Kelly (IRL)	Splendor–Wickes	s.t.
9	Stefan Mutter (SUI)	Cilo–Aufina	s.t.
10	Daniel Willems (BEL)	Capri Sonne–Koga Miyata	s.t.
