= 2012 Tour of Flanders =

2012 UCI World Tour, race 8 of 28
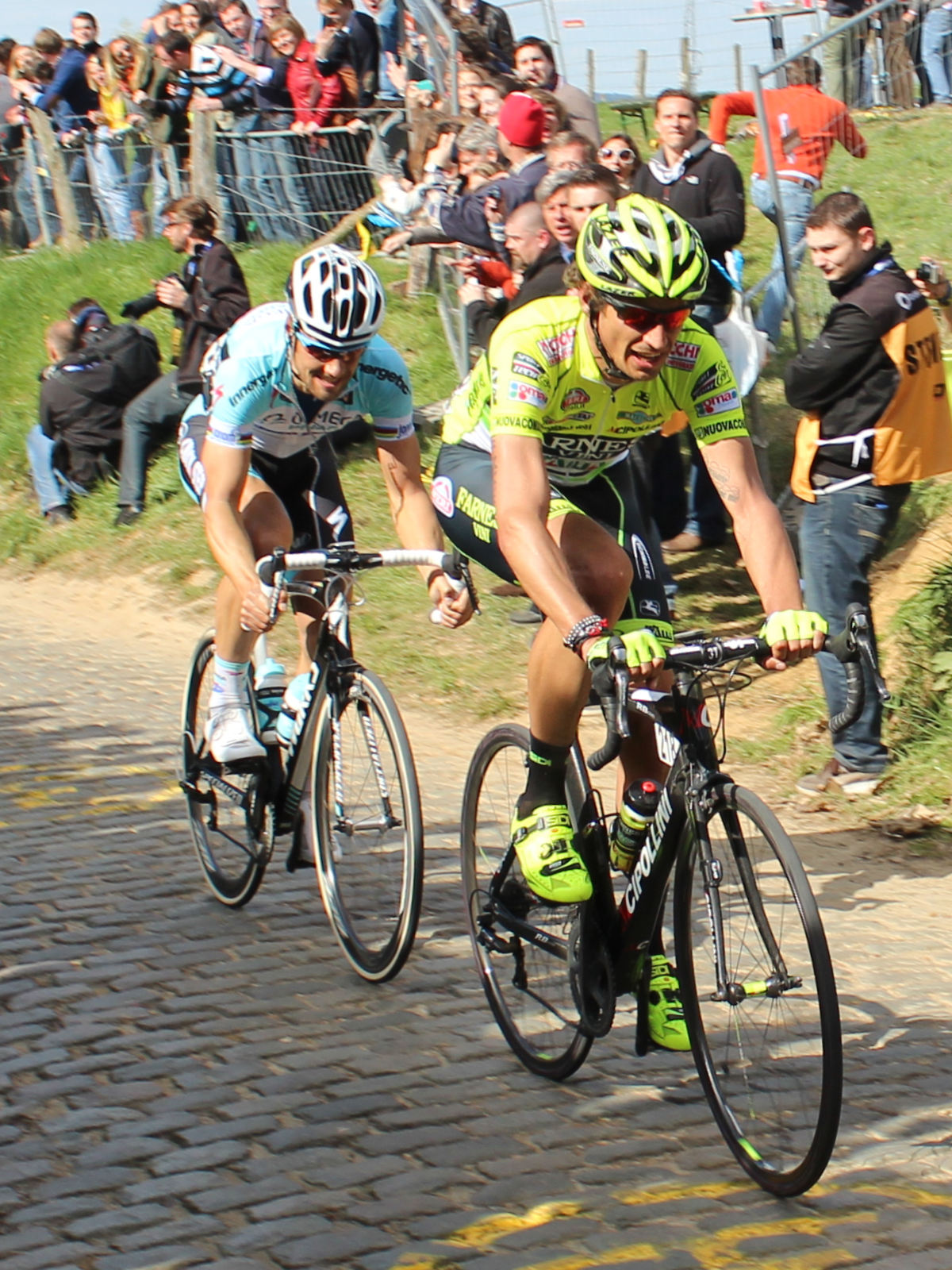
- Tom Boonen and Filippo Pozzato on the third climb of Oude Kwaremont

Race details
- Dates: 1 April 2012
- Stages: 1
- Distance: 256.9 km (159.6 mi)
- Winning time: 6h 04' 33"

Results
	Winner	Tom Boonen (BEL)	(Omega Pharma–Quick-Step)
	Second	Filippo Pozzato (ITA)	(Farnese Vini–Selle Italia)
	Third	Alessandro Ballan (ITA)	(BMC Racing Team)

The 2012 Tour of Flanders was the 96th edition of the Tour of Flanders single-day "Monument" cycling race. It was held on 1 April 2012 over a distance of 256.9 kilometres (159.6 miles) – between Bruges and Oudenaarde – and was the eighth race of the 2012 UCI World Tour season.

In a three-man sprint finish, the race was won by Omega Pharma–Quick-Step Belgian Tom Boonen, who in the process, became the fifth different rider to win the race three times, and took the lead of the overall World Tour standings. Boonen finished ahead of Farnese Vini–Selle Italia's Filippo Pozzato and 2007 winner Alessandro Ballan of BMC Racing Team, who completed the podium.

== Course change ==
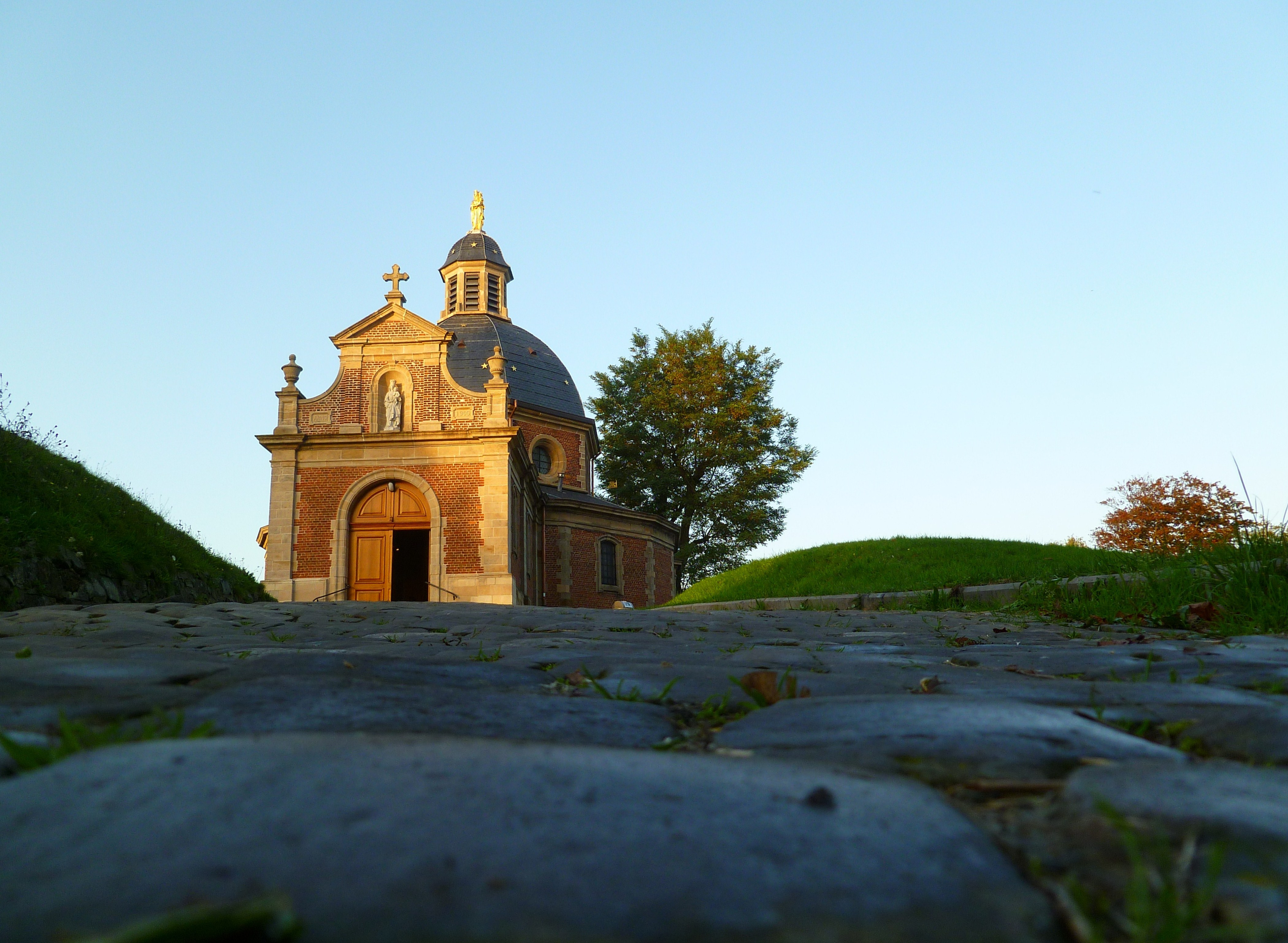
The Muur van Geraardsbergen was omitted from the race's itinerary in 2012

The course of the classic was changed drastically. The finish was changed from Meerbeke to Oudenaarde due to the result of a changed parcours to the race. Famous hills like the Muur van Geraardsbergen and the Bosberg were the final two hills in almost every edition from 1975 but were removed from the course. The new final featured the Oude Kwaremont and Paterberg, both were climbed three times. Also included in the final were the infamous Koppenberg – climbed after the first passage of the Oude Kwaremont and Paterberg – as well as the Steenbeekdries and the Kluisberg.

2010 winner Fabian Cancellara stated in the Belgium TV show De Laatste Show that he liked the new route of the race. He said that he disliked the dead moment from Tenbosse until the Muur in the old route and also the flat kilometres after the Bosberg until the finish. While Cancellara liked the new route, some riders expressed negative feelings about the new route. Two-time winner Stijn Devolder stated that: "This is no longer the Ronde van Vlaanderen". Former Belgian cyclist and three-time winner Johan Museeuw stated that the course was potentially made too hard: "Three times up the Oude Kwaremont and Paterberg can blow you away. The course didn't really need to be made harder, I think."

Many cycling fans, especially those in Belgium, also expressed against the changes in the route and thinking that the changes were made for commercial reasons. The omission of the Muur was not received well by the fans and was like "removing the Poggio from Milan–San Remo. The "Muur" was included in the first World Tour E3 Harelbeke in 2012.

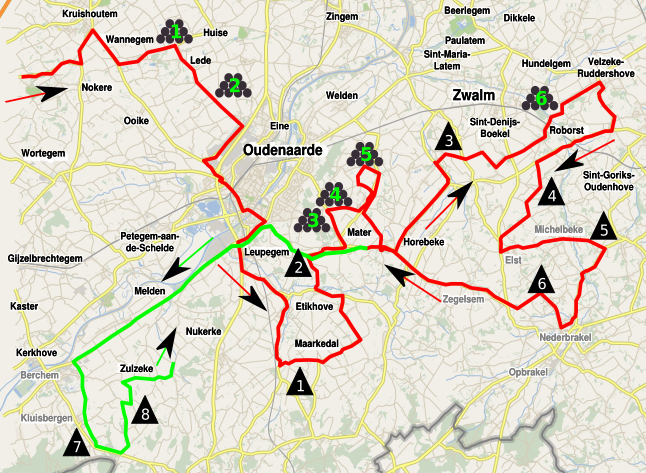
First lap of the circuit (red) and transition to the second lap (green).

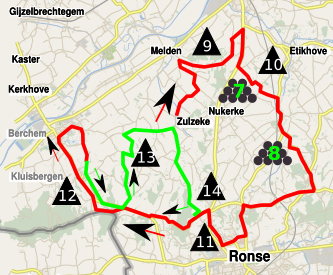
Second lap of the circuit (red) and transition to the third lap (green).

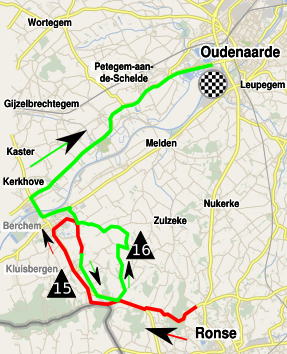
Third lap of the circuit (red) and final (green).

== Hills in the 2012 edition ==
1	Nokereberg	7	Valkenberg	13	Oude Kwaremont
2	Taaienberg	8	Oude Kwaremont	14	Paterberg
3	Eikenberg	9	Paterberg	15	Hoogberg-Hotond
4	Molenberg	10	Koppenberg	16	Oude Kwaremont
5	Rekelberg	11	Steenbeekdries	17	Paterberg
6	Berendries	11	Nieuwe Kruisberg		

== Participating teams ==
As the Tour of Flanders was a UCI World Tour event, all 18 UCI ProTeams were invited automatically and obligated to send a squad. Seven other squads were given wildcard places into the race, and as such, formed the event's 25-team peloton.

The 25 teams that competed in the race were:

- Ag2r–La Mondiale
- Astana
- BMC Racing Team
- Euskaltel–Euskadi
- FDJ–BigMat
- Garmin–Barracuda
- GreenEDGE
- Team Katusha
- Lampre–ISD
- Liquigas–Cannondale
- Lotto–Belisol
- Movistar Team
- Omega Pharma–Quick-Step
- Rabobank
- RadioShack–Nissan
- Team Saxo Bank
- Team Sky
- Vacansoleil–DCM
- Accent.jobs–Willems Veranda's
- Farnese Vini–Selle Italia
- Landbouwkrediet–Euphony
- Argos–Shimano
- Topsport Vlaanderen–Mercator
- Team Europcar
- Team NetApp

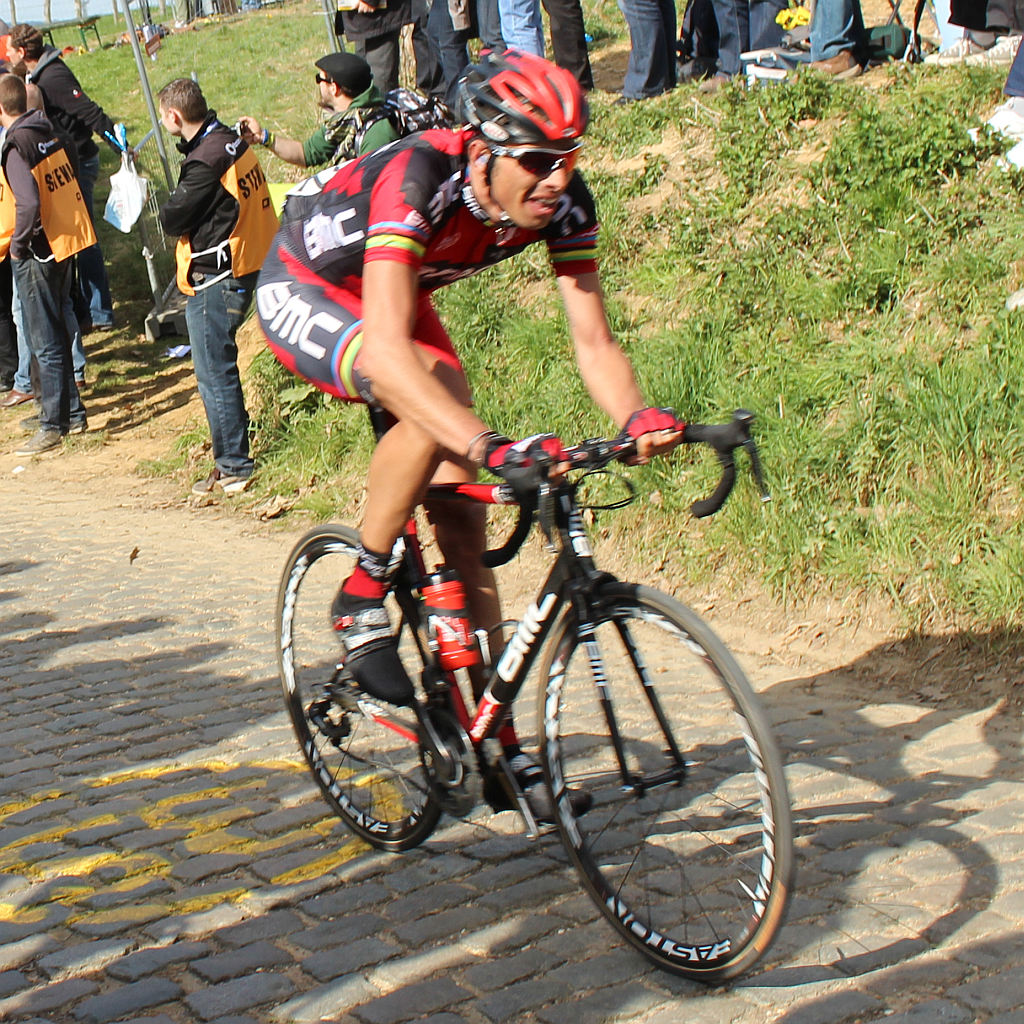
Alessandro Ballan finished third behind Tom Boonen and Filippo Pozzato.

== Race summary ==
Two main favourites were named before the race, 2005 and 2006 winner Tom Boonen and 2010 winner Fabian Cancellara, with outsiders including Matti Breschel, Sylvain Chavanel, Peter Sagan, Filippo Pozzato and Sep Vanmarcke.

A group of 15 riders, including amongst others Tyler Farrar, Pablo Lastras and Maarten Tjallingii, formed the early breakaway, but due to the size of the group there were not allowed to gain more than five minutes over the peloton.

In the peloton, the first attacks came during the first ascent of the Oude Kwaremont after about 180 km (111.8 mi), eliminating some of the lesser riders, but still leaving a big group chasing the leaders. But the first major event happened some 10 km (6.2 mi) later, as Cancellara crashed out of the race, fracturing his collar bone in four places.

At the start of the second ascent of the Paterberg, several riders crashed in the first part of the peloton, allowing a very select group of riders to take some advantage over the rest of the peloton. This elite group, which amongst others contained Boonen, Niki Terpstra, Chavanel, Sagan, Vanmarcke, Pozzato, Alessandro Ballan, Luca Paolini and Vincent Jérôme, raced past the remainder of the breakaway group and at that point seemed to be battling it out for the win. However, the riders stopped cooperating and in the peloton Team Sky chased hard in an attempt to bring Edvald Boasson Hagen back to the lead group, succeeding just before the third ascent of the Oude Kwaremont. During this ascent, Ballan raced away from the pack, only to be caught a few minutes later by Pozzato and Boonen.

Ballan, Boonen and Pozzato climbed the final ascent of the Paterberg together and despite numerous attempts by Ballan to get away from the other two, the three riders contested the sprint for the victory. In Oudenaarde, Boonen outsprinted Pozzato by one bike-length at the line, with Ballan taking third place. In a group of 43 riders finishing within one minute of the three leaders, Greg Van Avermaet finished in fourth place, edging out Sagan in fifth. Omega Pharma–Quick-Step were represented three times within the top ten; along with Boonen's win, Terpstra and Chavanel also placed highly.

== General standings ==
	Cyclist	Team	Time	UCI World Tour Points
1	Tom Boonen (BEL)	Omega Pharma–Quick-Step	6h 04' 33"	100
2	Filippo Pozzato (ITA)	Farnese Vini–Selle Italia	s.t.	–
3	Alessandro Ballan (ITA)	BMC Racing Team	+ 1"	70
4	Greg Van Avermaet (BEL)	BMC Racing Team	+ 38"	60
5	Peter Sagan (SVK)	Liquigas–Cannondale	+ 38"	50
6	Niki Terpstra (NED)	Omega Pharma–Quick-Step	+ 38"	40
7	Luca Paolini (ITA)	Team Katusha	+ 38"	30
8	Thomas Voeckler (FRA)	Team Europcar	+ 38"	–
9	Matti Breschel (DEN)	Rabobank	+ 38"	10
10	Sylvain Chavanel (FRA)	Omega Pharma–Quick-Step	+ 38"	4
