= 1983 Tour of Flanders =

67th Tour of Flanders
Race details
- Dates: 3 April 1983
- Stages: 1
- Distance: 272 km (169.0 mi)
- Winning time: 6h 37' 27"

Results
	Winner	Jan Raas (NED)	(TI–Raleigh–Campagnolo)
	Second	Ludo Peeters (BEL)	(TI–Raleigh–Campagnolo)
	Third	Marc Sergeant (BEL)	(Europdecor–Eddy Merckx)

The 67th running of the Tour of Flanders cycling classic was held on Sunday, 3 April 1983. Dutch rider Jan Raas claimed his second win in the monument race following a 20 km solo attack. His teammate Ludo Peeters won the sprint for second place at one-and-a-half minute. 38 of 188 riders finished.

== Route ==
The race started in Sint Niklaas and finished in Meerbeke (Ninove) – covering 272 km. There were 12 categorized climbs:

- Oude Kwaremont
- Koppenberg
- Taaienberg
- Berg Ten Houte
- Eikenberg
- Volkegemberg
- Varent
- Molenberg
- Berendries
- Pijpketel
- Muur van Geraardsbergen
- Bosberg

== Results ==
Result
Rank	Rider	Team	Time
1	Jan Raas (NED)	TI–Raleigh–Campagnolo	6h 37' 27"
2	Ludo Peeters (BEL)	TI–Raleigh–Campagnolo	+ 1' 30"
3	Marc Sergeant (BEL)	Europdecor–Eddy Merckx	s.t.
4	Luc Colijn (BEL)	Fangio–Tönissteiner	s.t.
5	Guy Nulens (BEL)	Jacky Aernoudt–Campagnolo	s.t.
6	Paul Haghedooren (BEL)	Euro Shop–Splendor	s.t.
7	Michel Pollentier (BEL)	Safir–Moser	s.t.
8	Johan van der Velde (NED)	TI–Raleigh–Campagnolo	s.t.
9	Phil Anderson (AUS)	Peugeot–Shell–Michelin	s.t.
10	Jan Bogaert (BEL)	Europdecor–Eddy Merckx	+ 6' 22"
