= 1982 Tour of Flanders =

66th Tour of Flanders
Race details
- Dates: 4 April 1982
- Stages: 1
- Distance: 267 km (165.9 mi)
- Winning time: 6h 35' 40"

Results
	Winner	René Martens (BEL)	(Daf Trucks–Teve Blad)
	Second	Eddy Planckaert (BEL)	(Splendor–Wickes)
	Third	Rudy Pevenage (BEL)	(Capri Sonne)

The 66th running of the Tour of Flanders cycling classic was held on Sunday, 4 April 1982. Belgian rider René Martens claimed a surprise victory after breaking away solo on the Muur van Geraardsbergen. Eddy Planckaert won the sprint for second at 20 seconds, ahead of Rudy Pevenage. It was by and large Martens' biggest career victory. 51 of 212 riders finished.

== Route ==
The race started in Sint Niklaas and finished in Meerbeke (Ninove) – covering 267 km. There were 11 categorized climbs:

- Oude Kwaremont
- Koppenberg
- Taaienberg
- Berg Ten Houte
- Eikenberg
- Volkegemberg
- Varent
- Steenberg
- Pijpketel
- Muur van Geraardsbergen
- Bosberg

== Results ==
Result
Rank	Rider	Team	Time
1	René Martens (BEL)	Daf Trucks–Teve Blad	6h 35' 40"
2	Eddy Planckaert (BEL)	Splendor–Wickes	+ 21"
3	Rudy Pevenage (BEL)	Capri Sonne	s.t.
4	Michel Pollentier (BEL)	Safir–Concorde	s.t.
5	Jan Bogaert (BEL)	Europ Decor	+ 45"
6	Palmiro Masciarelli (ITA)	Famcucina	+ 1' 15"
7	Patrick Versluys (BEL)	Boule d'Or–Colnago	s.t.
8	Gery Verlinden (BEL)	Boule d'Or–Colnago	s.t.
9	Marc Sergeant (BEL)	Boule d'Or–Colnago	s.t.
10	Johan van der Velde (NED)	TI–Raleigh–Campagnolo	s.t.
