= 2002 Tour of Flanders =

Race details
- Dates: 7 April 2002
- Stages: 1
- Distance: 264 km (164.0 mi)
- Winning time: 6h 53' 00"

Results
	Winner	Andrea Tafi (ITA)	(Mapei–Quick Step)
	Second	Johan Museeuw (BEL)	(Domo–Farm Frites)
	Third	Peter Van Petegem (BEL)	(Lotto–Adecco)

The 86th running of the Tour of Flanders cycling race in Belgium was held on Sunday 7 April 2002. It was the second leg of the 2002 UCI Road World Cup. Italian Andrea Tafi won the monument classic ahead of Johan Museeuw and Peter Van Petegem. The race started in Bruges and finished in Meerbeke (Ninove).

== Race summary ==
Erwin Thijs was in the front for almost 200 km. After the Koppenberg, 55 km from the finish, eight riders broke away. Five of them, Johan Museeuw, George Hincapie, Peter Van Petegem, Andrea Tafi and Daniele Nardello, stayed ahead after Museeuw attacked on the Muur van Geraardsbergen. Museeuw and Van Petegem tried to break clear, but they thwarted each other's attempts. When Andrea Tafi attacked, 4 km before the finish, the rest hesitated and the Italian pushed on until the finish. Museeuw beat Van Petegem in the sprint for second place. Mario Cipollini won the sprint for ninth ahead of Erik Zabel at 2' 27". French newspaper L'Équipe called the race's finale "the most beautiful breakaway of the year".

== Climbs ==
The edition saw the re-introduction of the Koppenberg, 15 years after its previous appearance in 1987. In total, there were 16 categorized climbs:

- Molenberg
- Wolvenberg
- Kluisberg
- Knokteberg
- Oude Kwaremont
- Paterberg
- Koppenberg
- Steenbeekdries
- Taaienberg
- Eikenberg
- Kapelleberg
- Leberg
- Berendries
- Tenbosse
- Muur-Kapelmuur
- Bosberg

== Results ==
	Cyclist	Team	Time
1	Andrea Tafi (ITA)	Mapei–Quick Step	6h 53' 00"
2	Johan Museeuw (BEL)	Domo–Farm Frites	+ 21"
3	Peter Van Petegem (BEL)	Lotto–Domo	+ 21"
4	George Hincapie (USA)	US Postal	+ 21"
5	Daniele Nardello (ITA)	Mapei–Quick Step	+ 21"
6	Rolf Sörensen (DEN)	Landbouwkrediet–Colnago	+ 1' 12"
7	Enrico Cassani (ITA)	Domo–Farm Frites	+ 1' 12"
8	Gabriele Missaglia (ITA)	Lampre–Daikin	+ 1' 12"
9	Mario Cipollini (ITA)	Acqua & Sapone	+ 2' 27"
10	Erik Zabel (GER)	Team Telekom	+ 2' 27"
