= 2011 Amstel Gold Race =

2011 UCI World Tour, race 10 of 27

Race details
- Dates: 17 April 2011
- Stages: 1
- Distance: 260.4 km (161.8 mi)
- Winning time: 6h 30' 44"

Results
	Winner	Philippe Gilbert (BEL)	(Omega Pharma–Lotto)
	Second	Joaquim Rodríguez (ESP)	(Team Katusha)
	Third	Simon Gerrans (AUS)	(Team Sky)

The 2011 Amstel Gold Race was the 46th running of the Amstel Gold Race, a single-day cycling race. It was held on 17 April 2011 over a distance of 260.4 kilometres (161.8 miles) and was the tenth race of the 2011 UCI World Tour season.

Omega Pharma–Lotto's Philippe Gilbert claimed victory for the second successive year after making a decisive move in the race's closing stages, attacking the field on the final climb of the race – the 12% gradient Cauberg – and thus becoming the first rider to win two Amstel Gold Races since Rolf Järmann won the race in 1993 and 1998. Gilbert also became only the second rider to win the race in consecutive years after Jan Raas' four consecutive victories between 1977 and 1980. Team Katusha's Joaquim Rodríguez finished the race in second place, having been the last challenger to Gilbert on the Cauberg, with the podium completed by Team Sky rider Simon Gerrans.

== Results ==
	Rider	Team	Time	World Tour Points
1	Philippe Gilbert (BEL)	Omega Pharma–Lotto	6h 30' 44"	80
2	Joaquim Rodríguez (ESP)	Team Katusha	+ 2"	60
3	Simon Gerrans (AUS)	Team Sky	+ 4"	50
4	Jakob Fuglsang (DEN)	Leopard Trek	+ 5"	40
5	Alexandr Kolobnev (RUS)	Team Katusha	+ 5"	30
6	Óscar Freire (ESP)	Rabobank	+ 5"	22
7	Björn Leukemans (BEL)	Vacansoleil–DCM	+ 7"	14
8	Ben Hermans (BEL)	Team RadioShack	+ 18"	10
9	Robert Gesink (NED)	Rabobank	+ 19"	6
10	Paul Martens (GER)	Rabobank	+ 26"	2
