= Jan Raas =

Dutch cyclist (born 1952)

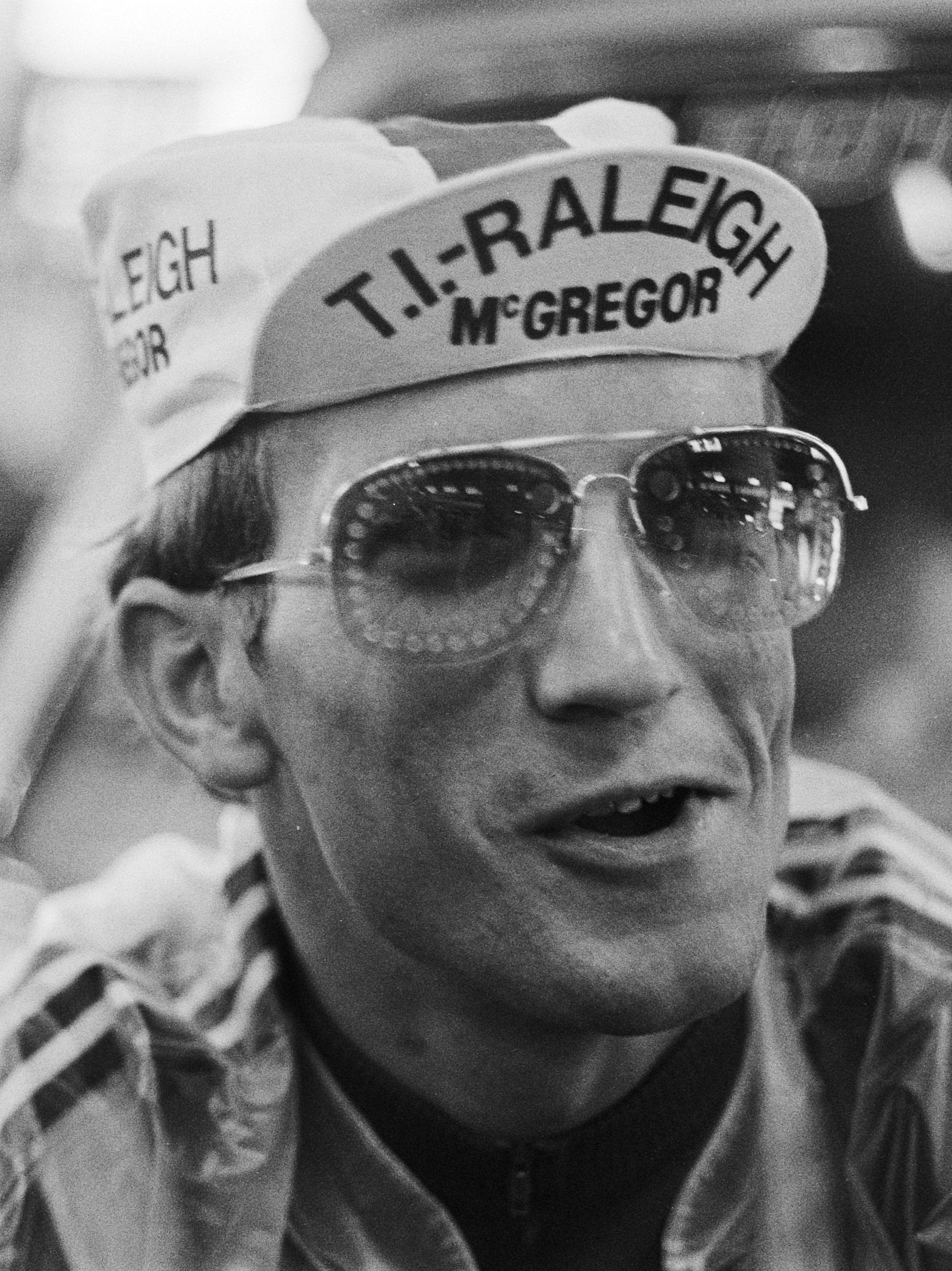
- Raas in 1978

Personal information
- Full name: Jan Raas
- Born: 8 November 1952 (age 73) Heinkenszand, Netherlands

Cycling career
- Sport: Cycling
- Discipline: Road
- Role: Rider
- Rider type: Classics specialist

Professional teams
- 1975–1976: TI–Raleigh
- 1977: Frisol–Thirion–Gazelle
- 1978–1983: TI–Raleigh–McGregor
- 1984–1985: Kwantum–Decosol–Yoko

Major wins
- Grand Tours Tour de France 10 individual stages (1977, 1978, 1979, 1980, 1982, 1984) Stage races Étoile de Bessèges (1981) Ronde van Nederland (1979) One-day races and Classics World Road Race Champion (1979) National Road Race Championship (1976, 1983, 1984) Milan–San Remo (1977) Tour of Flanders (1979, 1983) Paris–Roubaix (1982) Amstel Gold Race (1977, 1978, 1979, 1980, 1982) Gent–Wevelgem (1981) Omloop Het Volk (1981) Kuurne–Brussels–Kuurne (1980, 1983) E3 Prijs Vlaanderen (1979, 1980, 1981) Paris–Brussels (1978) Paris–Tours (1978, 1981)
Medal record
Representing the Netherlands
Men's road bicycle racing
World Championships
Gold medal – first place	1979 Valkenburg	Road race

Jan Raas (born 8 November 1952) is a Dutch former professional cyclist whose 115 wins include the 1979 World Road Race Championship in Valkenburg, the Tour of Flanders in 1979 and 1983, Paris–Roubaix in 1982 and Milan–San Remo in 1977. He won ten stages in the Tour de France. In six starts, Raas won the Amstel Gold Race five times. In his entire career he competed in 23 of the highly contested "Monument" Races and he finished on the podium in almost half of them: 1st place four times and 3rd place six times.

Raas was a tactician and clever sprinter. He struggled on long steep climbs, but excelled on the short climbs which were characteristic of the northern classics.

== Career ==
Born in Heinkenszand, near Goes in Zeeland, Raas was the son of a farmer and one of 10 children. He showed no interest in cycling until leaving school at 16 when he acquired his first racing bike and started competing as a junior category, taking his first victory in Damme in Belgium on the 21 July 1969. Further success as an amateur, including stage wins in the Olympia Tour and the national championship, prompted Peter Post, the manager of TI–Raleigh, to offer Raas a contract for 1975

The 22-year-old had a good first season with two small victories and fourth in the Tour of Belgium. The following year (1976) saw him become national champion, but at the end of that year Raas parted company with TI–Raleigh, looking for more freedom to race.

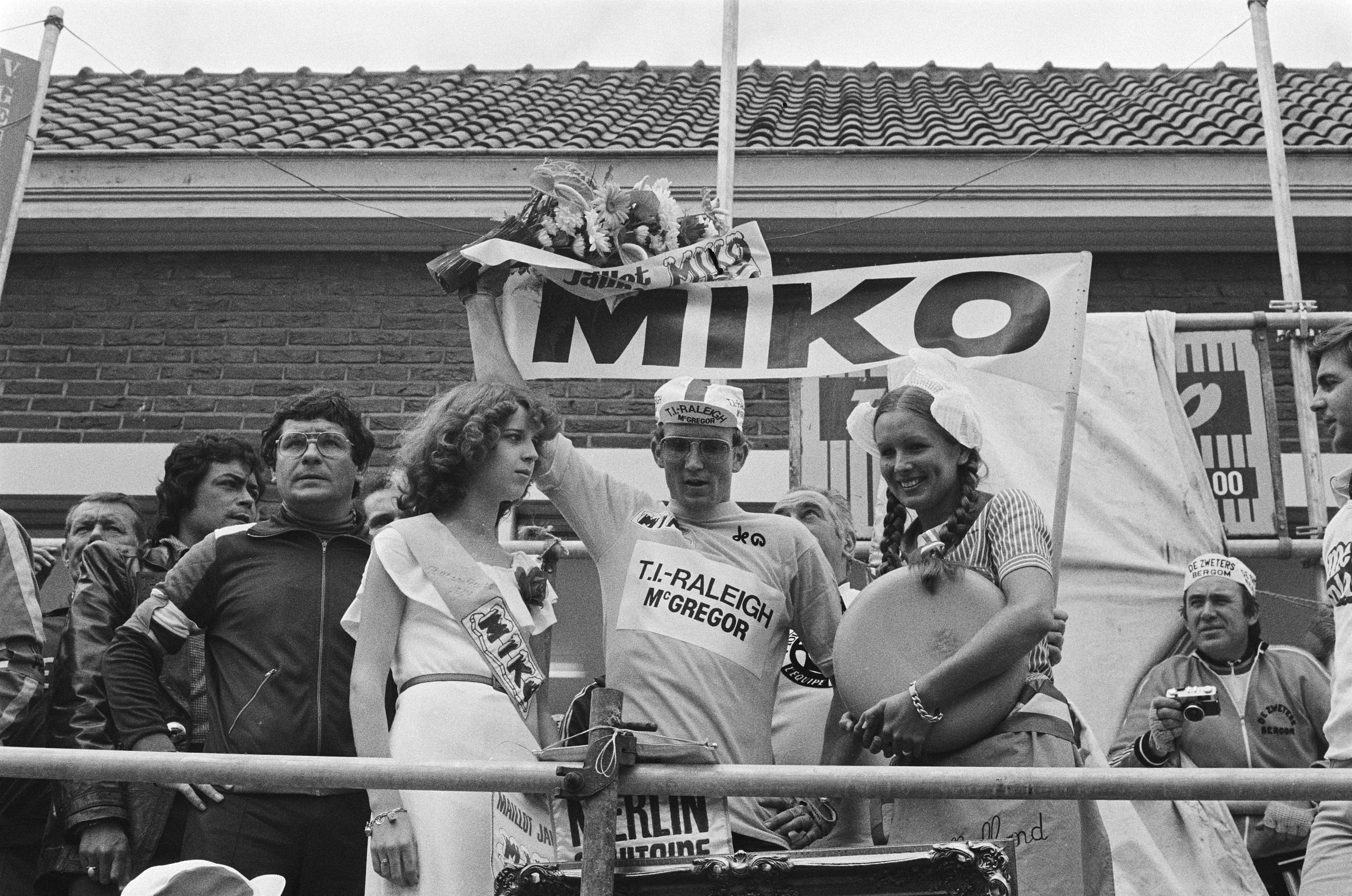
Raas wearing the yellow jersey at the 1978 Tour de France

In 1977 he rode for Frisol. Victories in Milan–San Remo and the Amstel Gold Race made Post rethink and Raas was back with TI–Raleigh for 1978. Raas became the influence behind the success of the team in the late seventies and early eighties. He was joint leader with Gerrie Knetemann, heading members such as Joop Zoetemelk, Ludo Peeters, Cees Priem and Henk Lubberding.

He played a major role in the victory of Zoetemelk in the 1980 Tour de France, as TI-Raleigh had one of the most dominant performances in all of TDF history not only containing Bernard Hinault, but also winning twelve stages, including seven in a row at one point.

Raas's highlights for the rest of his career included his 1979 world championship on home soil in Valkenburg, where he outsprinted German "Didi" Thurau in front of 200,000 spectators (even with the help from team-mates that push him during the climb, grabbing service vehicle, and the fall of Giovanni Battaglin caused by Thurau and Raas himself on the last 200m). He had four more victories in the Amstel Gold Race to give a record of five. Raas regarded the Amstel Gold as his favourite race: “The Gold Race was made for me, I had no ability as a climber, but the short and hard Limburg hills were made for me”, he said. He won Paris–Roubaix at his seventh attempt in 1982 thanks to work by his team, especially Peeters.

Raas crashed in the 1984 Milan–San Remo, injuring his back and internal organs and was never the same, although he took a stage in the 1984 Tour de France. He found the training and recovery hard and retired on 28 May 1985 after a criterium at Hansweert the preceding day.

Raas's know-how made for a natural move into team management and he became sporting director of Kwantum team. Raas found sponsors when old ones pulled out and the team received backing from SuperConfex, Buckler, WordPerfect, Novell and finally Rabobank.

Raas and his wife Anja suffered an armed raid on their house in March 1994 and Raas decided he could no longer spend long periods away from home. He changed from sporting director to manager when Rabobank became the main sponsor in 1995. He spent eight years in this capacity until the end of 2003, the sponsor indicating that insoluble differences prompted Raas's departure.

== Major results ==
1972
1st Stage 5 Olympia's Tour
1973
1st Ronde van Midden-Nederland
1974
Olympia's Tour

1st Stages 7a & 8

2nd Ronde van Drenthe
1975
1st Grote Prijs Stad Zottegem
5th Paris–Tours
6th E3 Prijs Vlaanderen
6th Tour of Flanders
8th Omloop Het Volk
1976
1st Road race, National Road Championships
1st Stage 4 Tour of Belgium
2nd Amstel Gold Race
2nd Tour du Haut Var
4th Brabantse Pijl
7th Paris–Roubaix
9th Omloop Het Volk
1977
1st Milan–San Remo
1st Amstel Gold Race
1st Stage 6 Tour de France
2nd Omloop Het Volk
3rd Tour of Flanders
4th Overall Tour Méditerranéen

1st Stage 1

5th Brabantse Pijl
6th Paris–Roubaix
7th E3 Prijs Vlaanderen
8th Paris–Tours
10th Gent–Wevelgem
1978
1st Amstel Gold Race
1st Paris–Brussels
1st Paris–Tours
Tour de France

1st Prologue, Stages 1a & 21

1st Stage 2 Ronde van Nederland
1st Stage 3 Tour de Suisse
1st Stage 4 Four Days of Dunkirk
2nd E3 Prijs Vlaanderen
3rd Paris–Roubaix
3rd Omloop Het Volk
4th Gent–Wevelgem
1979
1st Road race, UCI Road World Championships
1st Overall Ronde van Nederland

1st Prologue
1st Stage 2

1st Amstel Gold Race
1st E3 Prijs Vlaanderen
1st Tour of Flanders
1st Stage 5 Tour de France
1st Stage 3 Paris–Nice
1st Stage 4 Deutschland Tour
1st Stage 1b Tour of Belgium
Tour Méditerranéen

1st Prologue & Stage 5a

2nd Omloop Het Volk
3rd Gent–Wevelgem
3rd Paris–Tours
5th Paris–Roubaix
1980
Tour de France

1st Stages 1a, 1b (TTT), 7b & 9

1st Amstel Gold Race
1st E3 Prijs Vlaanderen
1st Kuurne–Brussels–Kuurne
1st Stage 1b Paris–Nice
1st Stage 3 Ronde van Nederland
1st Stage 3 Tour of Belgium
Tour Méditerranéen

1st Prologue (with Gerrie Knetemann), Stages 2 & 3b

1st Stage 3 Étoile de Bessèges
Tour de Luxembourg

1st Prologue & Stage 1

1st Stage GP de Cannes
1st Six Days of Rotterdam (track) (with René Pijnen)
3rd Milan–San Remo
3rd Tour of Flanders
3rd Scheldeprijs Vlaanderen
4th Omloop Het Volk
6th Gent–Wevelgem
1981
1st Overall Étoile de Bessèges

1st Prologue, Stages 1 & 3

1st E3 Prijs Vlaanderen
1st Gent–Wevelgem
1st Omloop Het Volk
1st Grote Prijs Jef Scherens
1st Stage 3b Tour Méditerranéen
3rd Tour of Flanders
5th Amstel Gold Race
1982
1st Amstel Gold Race
1st Paris–Roubaix
1st Dwars door België
2nd Overall Ronde van Nederland

1st Prologue

1st Prologue Étoile de Bessèges
Tour de France

1st Stages 6 & 9a (TTT)

5th E3 Prijs Vlaanderen
6th Omloop Het Volk
1983
1st Road race, National Road Championships
1st Tour of Flanders
1st Kuurne–Brussels–Kuurne
1st Ronde van Midden-Zeeland
1st Stage 1a Three Days of De Panne
2nd Gent–Wevelgem
2nd Omloop Het Volk
3rd Milan–San Remo
3rd Amstel Gold Race
1984
1st Road race, National Road Championships
1st Stage 9 Tour de France

=== General classification results timeline ===
Grand Tour general classification results
Grand Tour	1975	1976	1977	1978	1979	1980	1981	1982	1983	1984	1985
Giro d'Italia	Has not contested during his career										
Tour de France	—	24	DNF	83	DNF	DNF	—	DNF	DNF	DNF	—
Vuelta a España	Has not contested during his career										

=== Classics results timeline ===
Monument	1975	1976	1977	1978	1979	1980	1981	1982	1983	1984	1985
Milan–San Remo	—	—	1	105	12	3	—	14	3	—	93
Tour of Flanders	6	11	3	22	1	3	3	13	1	—	—
Paris–Roubaix	40	7	6	3	5	—	—	1	—	—	—
Liège–Bastogne–Liège	—	—	13	—	—	—	—	—	—	—	—
Giro di Lombardia	Has not contested during his career										
Classic	1975	1976	1977	1978	1979	1980	1981	1982	1983	1984	1985
Amstel Gold Race	—	2	1	1	1	1	5	1	3	—	—
La Flèche Wallonne	—	—	—	31	—	—	—	—	—	—	—
Gent Wevelgem	24	—	10	4	3	6	1	—	2	—	—
Paris–Brussels	—	28	—	1	11	33	2	7	—	—	—
Paris–Tours	5	8	—	1	3	35	1	24	3	30	—

=== Major championship results timeline ===
Event		1975	1976	1977	1978	1979	1980	1981	1982	1983	1984	1985
World Championships	Road race	DNF	9	DNF	13	1	DNF	DNF	17	—	DNF	—
National Championships	Road race	—	1	—	2	3	5	—	4	1	1	—

Legend
—	Did not compete
DNF	Did not finish

=== Awards ===
- Dutch Sportsman of the year: 1979

== See also ==
- List of Dutch cyclists who have led the Tour de France general classification

Sporting positions
Preceded by Hennie Kuiper	Dutch National Road Race Champion; 1976	Succeeded by Fedor den Hertog
Preceded by Johan van der Velde	Dutch National Road Race Champion; 1983–1984	Succeeded by Jacques Hanegraaf
Awards
Preceded by Gerrie Knetemann	Dutch Sportsman of the Year; 1979	Succeeded by Joop Zoetemelk
