= 1981 Grand Prix d'Automne =

Race details
- Dates: 11 October 1981
- Stages: 1
- Distance: 228 km (141.7 mi)
- Winning time: 5h 41' 47"

Results
| | Winner | Jan Raas (NED) |
| | Second | Ferdi Van Den Haute (BEL) |
| | Third | Luc Colijn (BEL) |

The 1981 Grand Prix d'Automne was the 75th edition of the Paris–Tours cycle race and was held on 11 October 1981. The race started in Blois and finished in Chaville. The race was won by Jan Raas.

== General classification ==
Final general classification

| Rank | Rider | Time |
|---|---|---|
| 1 | Jan Raas (NED) | 5h 41' 47" |
| 2 | Ferdi Van Den Haute (BEL) | + 0" |
| 3 | Luc Colijn (BEL) | + 0" |
| 4 | Gianbattista Baronchelli (ITA) | + 0" |
| 5 | Ronny Claes (BEL) | + 0" |
| 6 | Patrick Bonnet (FRA) | + 0" |
| 7 | Theo de Rooij (NED) | + 0" |
| 8 | Hennie Kuiper (NED) | + 0" |
| 9 | Philippe van de Ghinste (BEL) | + 0" |
| 10 | Rudy Pevenage (BEL) | + 43" |
