= 1982 Amstel Gold Race =

Dutch cycling race

The 1982 Amstel Gold Race was the 17th edition of the annual Amstel Gold Race road bicycle race, held on Saturday April 24, 1982, in the Dutch province of Limburg. The race stretched 237 kilometres, with the start in Heerlen and the finish in Meerssen. There was a total of 152 competitors, and 39 cyclists finished the race.

== Result ==
Final result (1–10)
Rank	Rider	Time
1	Jan Raas (NED)	6:10:45
2	Stephen Roche (IRL)	+ 0.02
3	Gregor Braun (GER)	+ 0.07
4	Sean Kelly (IRL)	+ 0
5	Phil Anderson (AUS)	+ 0
6	Hennie Kuiper (NED)	+ 0
7	Ludo Peeters (BEL)	+ 1.14
8	Adri van der Poel (NED)	+ 0
9	Jostein Wilmann (NOR)	+ 0
10	Ad Wijnands (NED)	+ 0
