= 1979 Gent–Wevelgem =

Race details
- Dates: 4 April 1979
- Stages: 1
- Distance: 252 km (157 mi)
- Winning time: 5h 48' 00"

Results
	Winner	Francesco Moser (ITA)	(Sanson–Luxor TV–Campagnolo)
	Second	Roger De Vlaeminck (BEL)	(Gis Gelati)
	Third	Jan Raas (NED)	(TI–Raleigh–McGregor)

The 1979 Gent–Wevelgem was the 41st edition of the Belgian Gent–Wevelgem cycle race and was held on 4 April 1979. The race started in Ghent and finished in Wevelgem. The race was won by Francesco Moser of the Sanson team.

== General classification ==
Final general classification

Rank	Rider	Team	Time
1	Francesco Moser (ITA)	Sanson–Luxor TV–Campagnolo	5h 48' 00"
2	Roger De Vlaeminck (BEL)	Gis Gelati	+ 0"
3	Jan Raas (NED)	TI–Raleigh–McGregor	+ 0"
4	Marc Demeyer (BEL)	Flandria–Ça va seul	+ 0"
5	Henk Lubberding (NED)	TI–Raleigh–McGregor	+ 0"
6	Daniel Willems (BEL)	IJsboerke–Warncke Eis	+ 31"
7	Willy Teirlinck (BEL)	Kas–Campagnolo	+ 31"
8	Bernard Hinault (FRA)	Renault–Gitane	+ 31"
9	Fons van Katwijk (NED)	Marc Zeep Savon–Superia	+ 31"
10	Hennie Kuiper (NED)	Peugeot–Esso–Michelin	+ 31"
