= 1978 Grand Prix d'Automne =

Race details
- Dates: 1 October 1978
- Stages: 1
- Distance: 271 km (168.4 mi)
- Winning time: 6h 58' 02"

Results
	Winner	Jan Raas (NED)
	Second	Jos Jacobs (BEL)
	Third	Guido Van Calster (BEL)

The 1978 Grand Prix d'Automne was the 72nd edition of the Paris–Tours cycle race and was held on 1 October 1978. The race started in Blois and finished in Montlhéry. The race was won by Jan Raas.

== General classification ==
Final general classification

Rank	Rider	Time
1	Jan Raas (NED)	6h 58' 02"
2	Jos Jacobs (BEL)	+ 3' 36"
3	Guido Van Calster (BEL)	+ 3' 36"
4	Joop Zoetemelk (NED)	+ 3' 36"
5	André Dierickx (BEL)	+ 3' 36"
6	Gerrie Knetemann (NED)	+ 3' 36"
7	Phil Edwards (GBR)	+ 3' 36"
8	Johan van der Velde (NED)	+ 5' 59"
9	Gery Verlinden (BEL)	+ 5' 59"
10	Willy De Geest (BEL)	+ 5' 59"
