= 1976 Omloop Het Volk =

Race details
- Dates: 6 March 1976
- Stages: 1
- Distance: 202 km (126 mi)
- Winning time: 4h 46' 00"

Results
	Winner	Willem Peeters (BEL)
	Second	Hennie Kuiper (NED)
	Third	Patrick Sercu (BEL)

The 1976 Omloop Het Volk was the 31st edition of the Omloop Het Volk cycle race and was held on 6 March 1976. The race started and finished in Ghent. The race was won by Willem Peeters.

== General classification ==
Final general classification
Rank	Rider	Time
1	Willem Peeters (BEL)	4h 46' 00"
2	Hennie Kuiper (NED)	+ 6"
3	Patrick Sercu (BEL)	+ 1' 04"
4	Walter Planckaert (BEL)	+ 1' 04"
5	Luc Leman (BEL)	+ 1' 04"
6	Cees Bal (NED)	+ 1' 04"
7	Pé Verhaegen (BEL)	+ 1' 04"
8	Frans Verbeeck (BEL)	+ 1' 04"
9	Jan Raas (NED)	+ 1' 04"
10	Wilfried Wesemael (BEL)	+ 1' 04"
