= 1978 Gent–Wevelgem =

Race details
- Dates: 12 April 1978
- Stages: 1
- Distance: 246 km (153 mi)
- Winning time: 6h 24' 00"

Results
	Winner	Ferdi Van Den Haute (BEL)	(Marc Zeepcentrale–Superia)
	Second	Walter Planckaert (BEL)	(C&A)
	Third	Francesco Moser (ITA)	(Sanson–Campagnolo)

The 1978 Gent–Wevelgem was the 40th edition of the Belgian Gent–Wevelgem cycle race and was held on 12 April 1978. The race started in Ghent and finished in Wevelgem. The race was won by Ferdi Van Den Haute of the Marc team.

== General classification ==
Final general classification

Rank	Rider	Team	Time
1	Ferdi Van Den Haute (BEL)	Marc Zeepcentrale–Superia	6h 24' 00"
2	Walter Planckaert (BEL)	C&A	+ 1' 05"
3	Francesco Moser (ITA)	Sanson–Campagnolo	+ 1' 05"
4	Jan Raas (NED)	TI–Raleigh–McGregor	+ 1' 05"
5	Ludo Peeters (BEL)	IJsboerke–Gios	+ 1' 15"
6	Roger De Vlaeminck (BEL)	Sanson–Campagnolo	+ 1' 15"
7	Rik Van Linden (BEL)	Bianchi–Faema	+ 2' 10"
8	Ronald De Witte (BEL)	Sanson–Campagnolo	+ 2' 10"
9	Freddy Maertens (BEL)	Flandria–Velda–Lano	+ 2' 10"
10	Michel Pollentier (BEL)	Flandria–Velda–Lano	+ 2' 10"
