= 1981 Gent–Wevelgem =

Race details
- Dates: 8 April 1981
- Stages: 1
- Distance: 254.4 km (158.1 mi)
- Winning time: 5h 47' 00"

Results
	Winner	Jan Raas (NED)	(TI–Raleigh–Creda)
	Second	Roger De Vlaeminck (BEL)	(DAF Trucks–Côte d'Or)
	Third	Alfons De Wolf (BEL)	(Vermeer Thijs)

The 1981 Gent–Wevelgem was the 43rd edition of the Belgian Gent–Wevelgem cycle race and was held on 8 April 1981. The race started in Ghent and finished in Wevelgem. The race was won by Jan Raas of the TI–Raleigh team.

== General classification ==
Final general classification

Rank	Rider	Team	Time
1	Jan Raas (NED)	TI–Raleigh–Creda	5h 47' 00"
2	Roger De Vlaeminck (BEL)	DAF Trucks–Côte d'Or	+ 0"
3	Alfons De Wolf (BEL)	Vermeer Thijs	+ 0"
4	Gregor Braun (FRG)	Famcucine–Campagnolo	+ 0"
5	Marc Demeyer (BEL)	Capri Sonne–Koga Miyata	+ 0"
6	Adri van der Poel (NED)	DAF Trucks–Côte d'Or	+ 0"
7	Ludo Peeters (BEL)	TI–Raleigh–Creda	+ 0"
8	Eddy Vanhaerens (BEL)	Boule d'Or–Sunair	+ 12"
9	Giuseppe Saronni (ITA)	Gis Gelati–Campagnolo	+ 12"
10	Jos Jacobs (BEL)	Capri Sonne–Koga Miyata	+ 12"
