= 1978 Amstel Gold Race =

Dutch cycling race

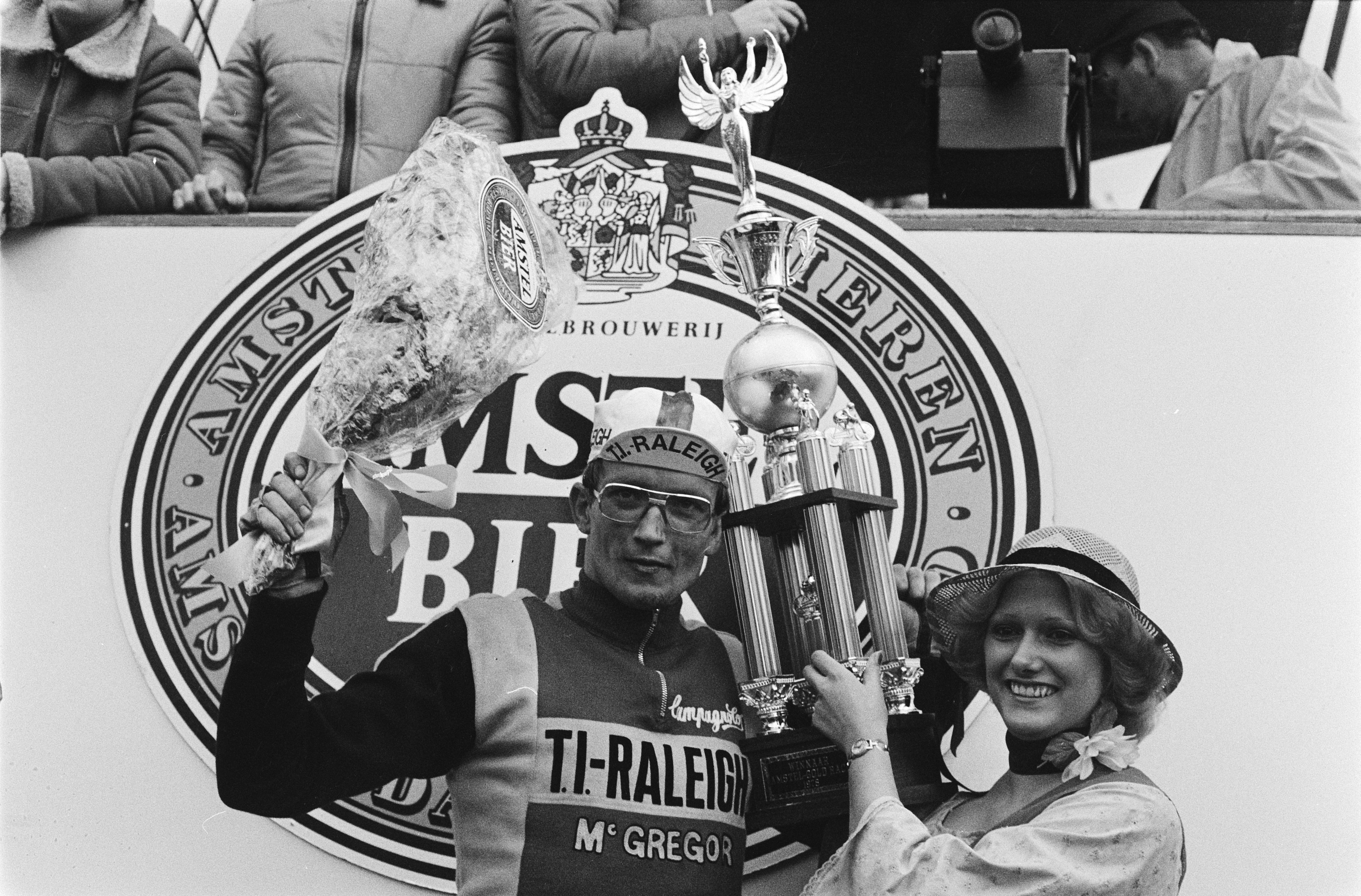
Amstel Gold Race cycling winner Jan Raas with flowers, Component No 929-6433

The 1978 Amstel Gold Race was the 13th edition of the annual Amstel Gold Race road bicycle race, held on Sunday March 25, 1978, in the Dutch province of Limburg. The race stretched 230 kilometres, with the start in Heerlen and the finish in Meerssen. There were a total of 138 competitors, and 32 cyclists finished the race.

== Result ==
Final result (1–10)
Rank	Rider	Time
1	Jan Raas (NED)	6:05:03
2	Francesco Moser (ITA)	+ 1.16
3	Joop Zoetemelk (NED)	+ 0
4	Freddy Maertens (BEL)	+ 0
5	Hennie Kuiper (NED)	+ 0
6	Gerrie Knetemann (NED)	+ 4.02
7	Gregor Braun (FRG)	+ 0
8	Leo van Vliet (NED)	+ 4.36
9	Dietrich Thurau (FRG)	+ 5.04
10	Bernard Bourreau (FRA)	+ 0
