= Steenbeekdries =

Coordinates: 50.4818°N 3.3649°E

- Location: Flanders; Belgium
- Start: Etikhove, Maarkedal
- Gain in altitude: 59 m (194 ft)
- Length of climb: 820 m (2,690 ft)
- Maximum elevation: 69 m (226 ft)
- Average gradient: 7.6 %
- Maximum gradient: 12.8 %

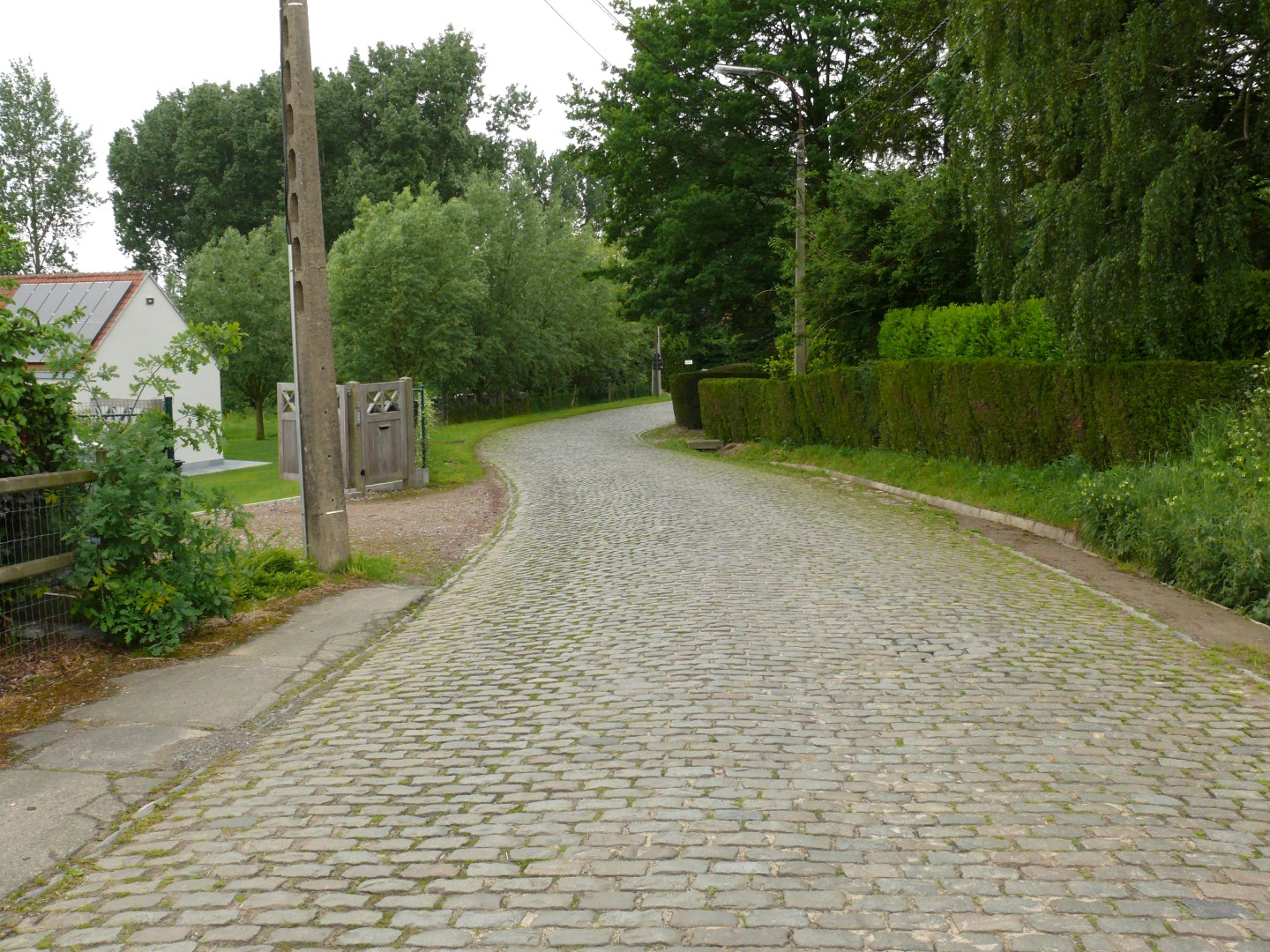

Steenbeekdries is an uphill cobbled road in the municipality of Maarkedal, in the Belgian province of East Flanders. With its top at 69 m altitude, it is one of many hill formations in the Flemish Ardennes, in the south of East-Flanders. The entire road is paved in cobbles; in 1995 the road of the Steenbeekdries was classified as a protected landscape monument.

== Cycling ==
The site is best known from road bicycle racing, as it regularly features in the spring classics, most notably the Tour of Flanders. The 800 m climb immediately follows the Mariaborrestraat, a long flat sector of cobbles, and at 7.6% average gradient, is not very steep. The descent following the climb, the Stationsberg, is a straight poorly-paved cobbled road and in fact steeper than the Steenbeekdries.

The Steenbeekdries was first included in the Tour of Flanders route in 2002 and has remained a fixed location in the race. In recent years, it comes at 39 km from the finish in Oudenaarde, usually the first climb after the notorious Koppenberg.

The Steenbeekdries is also regularly included in Dwars door Vlaanderen and the Tour of Flanders for Women.
