= 1982 Paris–Roubaix =

Race details
- Dates: April 18, 1982
- Stages: 1
- Distance: 270.5 km (168.1 mi)
- Winning time: 7h 21' 50"

Results
	Winner	Jan Raas (NED)	(TI Raleigh)
	Second	Yvon Bertin (FRA)	(Coop-Mercier)
	Third	Gregor Braun (GER)	(Capri Sonne)

The 1982 Paris–Roubaix bicycle road race was undertaken in very dry conditions, leaving the riders to battle dust clouds over the 270 km (170 mi) course. Jan Raas of the Netherlands entered the velodrome at Roubaix to win alone.

Below are the results for the 1982 edition of the Paris––Roubaix cycling classic.

== Results ==
	Cyclist	Team	Time
1	Jan Raas (NED)	Raleigh-Campagnolo	7h 21'50"
2	Yvon Bertin (FRA)	Co-Op	at '16
3	Gregor Braun (GER)	Capri-Sonne	at '16
4	Stefan Mutter (SUI)	Puch	at '16
5	Eddy Planckaert (BEL)	Wickes	at '37
6	Roger de Vlaeminck (BEL)	Daf	at '37
7	Marc Sergeant (BEL)	Boule d'Or	at '37
8	Ludo Peeters (BEL)	Raleigh-Campagnolo	at '37
9	Bernard Hinault (FRA)	Renault-Gitane	at '37
10	Francesco Moser (ITA)	Famcucine	at 1'37
