= 1979 Grand Prix d'Automne =

Race details
- Dates: 30 September 1979
- Stages: 1
- Distance: 228 km (141.7 mi)
- Winning time: 5h 38' 27"

Results
	Winner	Joop Zoetemelk (NED)
	Second	Giuseppe Saronni (ITA)
	Third	Jan Raas (NED)

The 1979 Grand Prix d'Automne was the 73rd edition of the Paris–Tours cycle race and was held on 30 September 1979. The race started in Blois and finished in Chaville. The race was won by Joop Zoetemelk.

== General classification ==
Final general classification

Rank	Rider	Time
1	Joop Zoetemelk (NED)	5h 38' 27"
2	Giuseppe Saronni (ITA)	+ 40"
3	Jan Raas (NED)	+ 40"
4	Daniel Willems (BEL)	+ 40"
5	Jean-Luc Vandenbroucke (BEL)	+ 40"
6	Bernard Hinault (FRA)	+ 40"
7	Marc Renier (BEL)	+ 40"
8	Claude Criquielion (BEL)	+ 40"
9	Cees Priem (NED)	+ 40"
10	Jacques Bossis (FRA)	+ 40"
