= 1980 Amstel Gold Race =

Dutch cycling race

The 1980 Amstel Gold Race was the 15th edition of the annual Amstel Gold Race road bicycle race, held on Sunday April 5, 1980, in the Dutch province of Limburg. The race stretched 238 kilometres, with the start in Heerlen and the finish in Meerssen. There were a total of 146 competitors, and 66 cyclists finished the race.

== Result ==
Final result (1–10)
Rank	Rider	Time
1	Jan Raas (NED)	5:44:27
2	Fons De Wolf (BEL)	+ 0
3	Sean Kelly (IRL)	+ 0
4	Jean Chassang (FRA)	+ 0
5	Bernard Hinault (FRA)	+ 0
6	Jacques Bossis (FRA)	+ 0
7	Daniel Willems (BEL)	+ 0
8	Gilbert Duclos-Lassalle (FRA)	+ 0
9	Jo Maas (NED)	+ 0
10	Jean-Phillipe Vandenbrande (BEL)	+ 0
