= 1978 Tour de Suisse =

Race details
- Dates: 14–23 June 1978
- Stages: 9 + Prologue
- Distance: 1,563 km (971.2 mi)
- Winning time: 39h 44' 47"

Results
	Winner	Paul Wellens (BEL)	(TI–Raleigh–McGregor)
	Second	Ueli Sutter (SUI)	(Zonca–Santini)
	Third	Josef Fuchs (SUI)	(Fiorella–Mocassini–Citroën)
	Points	Mariano Martínez (FRA)	(Jobo–Spidel–La Roue d'Or)
	Mountains	Mariano Martínez (FRA)	(Jobo–Spidel–La Roue d'Or)
	Combination	Dietrich Thurau (FRG)	(IJsboerke–Gios)
	Team	TI–Raleigh–McGregor	

The 1978 Tour de Suisse was the 42nd edition of the Tour de Suisse cycle race and was held from 14 June to 23 June 1978. The race started in Spreitenbach and finished in Affoltern. The race was won by Paul Wellens of the TI–Raleigh team.

== General classification ==
Final general classification

Rank	Rider	Team	Time
1	Paul Wellens (BEL)	TI–Raleigh–McGregor	39h 44' 47"
2	Ueli Sutter (SUI)	Zonca–Santini	+ 18"
3	Josef Fuchs (SUI)	Fiorella–Mocassini–Citroën	+ 1' 19"
4	Hennie Kuiper (NED)	TI–Raleigh–McGregor	+ 1' 48"
5	Gottfried Schmutz (SUI)	Willora–Piz Buin–Mairag	+ 3' 31"
6	Mariano Martínez (FRA)	Jobo–Spidel–La Roue d'Or	+ 4' 00"
7	Francisco Galdós (ESP)	Kas–Campagnolo	+ 4' 15"
8	Michel Pollentier (BEL)	Flandria–Velda–Lano	+ 4' 34"
9	Erwin Lienhard (SUI)	Willora–Piz Buin–Mairag	+ 4' 38"
10	Albert Zweifel (SUI)	Lejeune–BP	+ 7' 02"
