= 1977 Amstel Gold Race =

12th edition of the cycling race

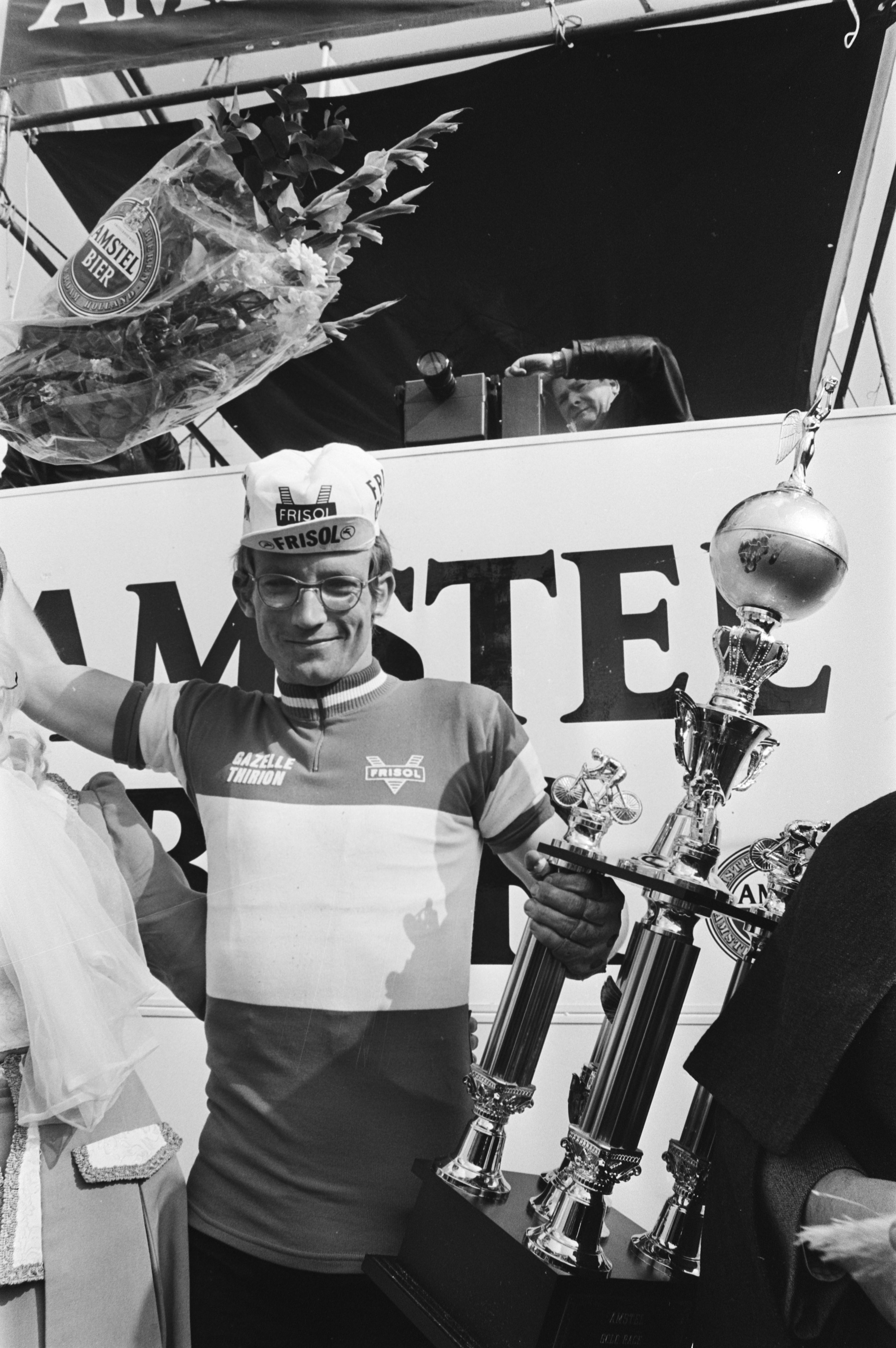
The winner of 1977 Amstel Gold Race

The 1977 Amstel Gold Race was the 12th edition of the annual Amstel Gold Race road bicycle race, held on Sunday April 9, 1977, in the Dutch province of Limburg. The race stretched 230 kilometres, with the start in Heerlen and the finish in Meerssen. There were a total of 145 competitors, while 54 cyclists finished the race.

== Result ==
Final result (1–10)
Rank	Rider	Time
1	Jan Raas (NED)	5:45:55
2	Gerrie Knetemann (NED)	+ 0
3	Hennie Kuiper (NED)	+ 0
4	Jos Schipper (NED)	+ 0.20
5	Freddy Maertens (BEL)	+ 0
6	Roger de Vlaeminck (BEL)	+ 0
7	Francesco Moser (ITA)	+ 0
8	Walter Godefroot (BEL)	+ 0.44
9	Eddy Merckx (BEL)	+ 0
10	Patrick Béon (FRA)	+ 0
