= Hennie Kuiper =

Dutch cyclist (born 1949)

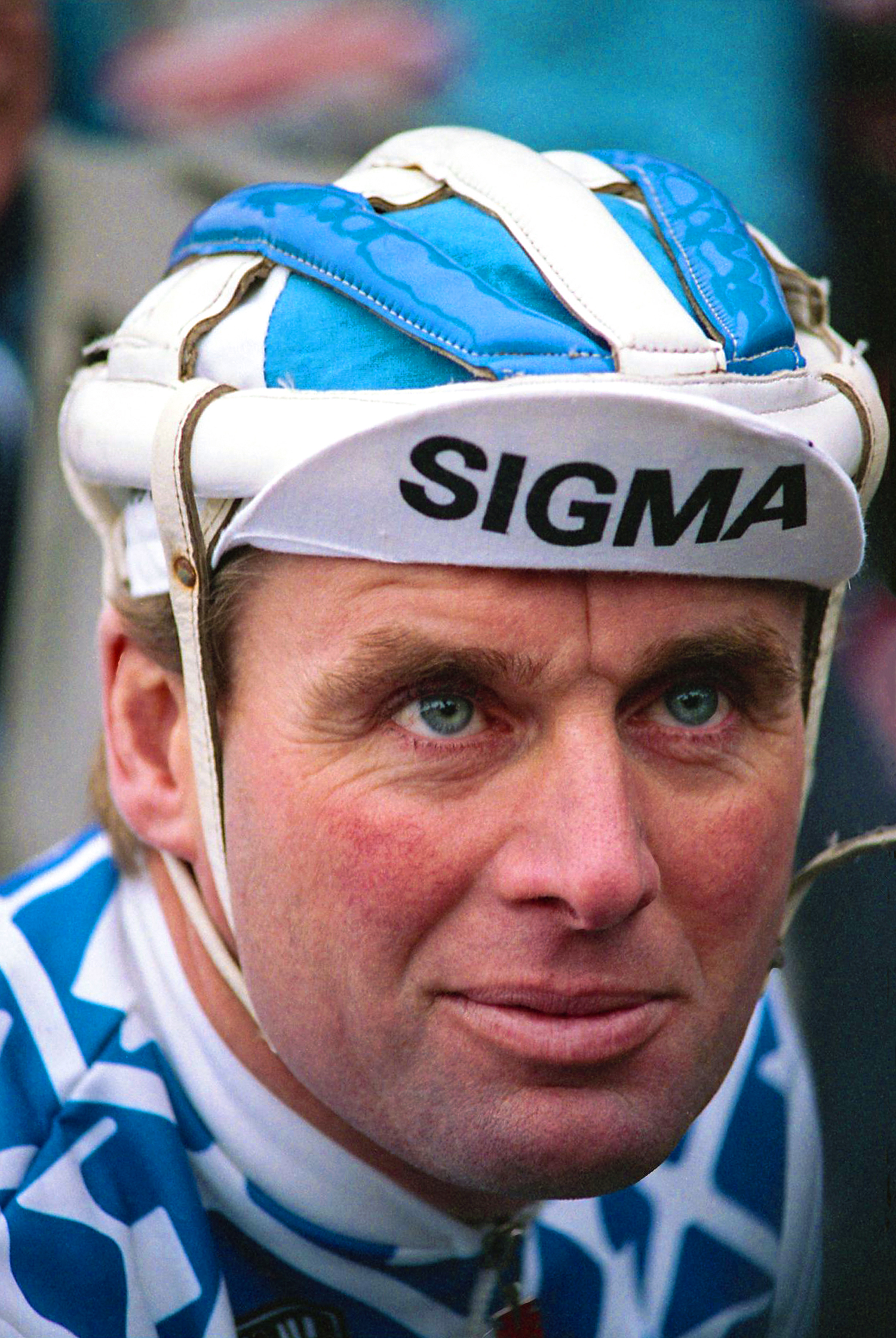
- Kuiper in 1988

Personal information
- Full name: Hendrikus Andreas Kuiper
- Born: 3 February 1949 (age 77) Denekamp, Netherlands

Cycling career
- Sport: Cycling
- Current team: Retired
- Discipline: Road
- Role: Rider
- Rider type: All-Rounder

Professional teams
- 1973–1974: Rokado–De Gribaldy
- 1975: Frisol–G.B.C.
- 1976–1978: TI–Raleigh–Campagnolo
- 1979–1980: Peugeot–Esso–Michelin
- 1981–1983: DAF Trucks–Côte d'Or
- 1984: Kwantum–Decosol–Yoko
- 1985: Verandalux–Dries
- 1986–1987: Skala-Skil
- 1988: Sigma–Fina

Major wins
- Grand Tours Tour de France 3 individual stages (1976, 1977, 1978) 2 TTT stages (1976, 1978) Vuelta a España 2 individual stages (1975, 1976) Stage Races Tour de Suisse (1976) Single-Day Races and Classics Olympic Road Race (1972) World Road Race Championships (1975) National Road Race Championships (1975) Tour of Flanders (1981) Giro di Lombardia (1981) Paris–Roubaix (1983) Milan–San Remo (1985)
Medal record
Representing the Netherlands
Men's road bicycle racing
Olympic Games
Gold medal – first place	1972 Munich	Individual road race
World Championships
Gold medal – first place	1975 Yvoir	Professional road race

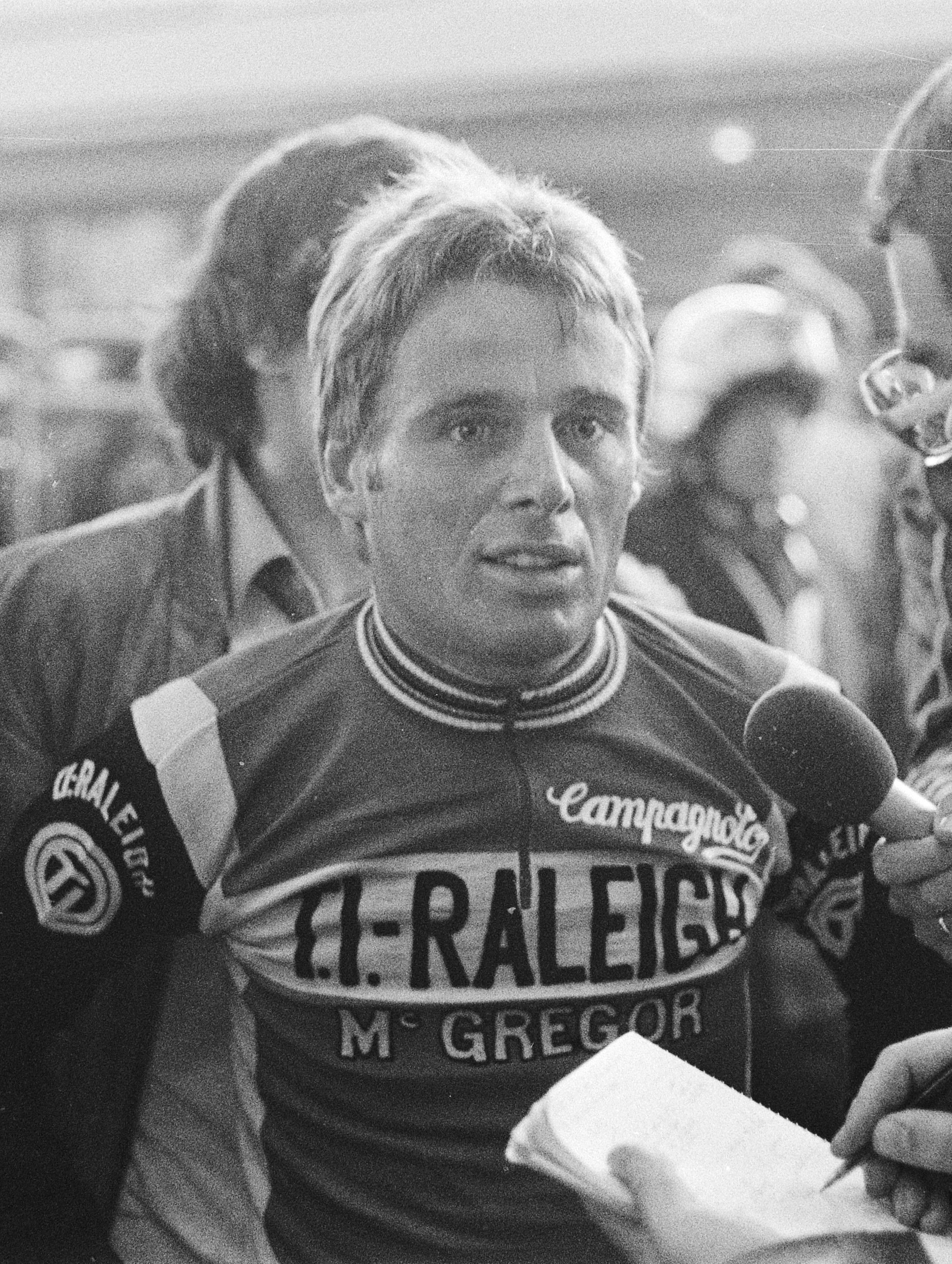
Hennie Kuiper, Tour de France 1978

Hendrikus Andreas "Hennie" Kuiper (born 3 February 1949) is a Dutch former professional road racing cyclist. His career includes a gold medal in the Olympic road race at Munich in 1972, becoming world professional road race champion in 1975, as well as winning four of the five "Monument" classics. He rode the Tour de France 12 times, finishing second twice and winning the stage to Alpe d'Huez on two occasions. Kuiper, Ercole Baldini, Paolo Bettini and Remco Evenepoel are the only male riders to have won both the Olympic road race and the world professional road race.

== Biography ==
Kuiper was born in Denekamp, in Overijssel province. His serious introduction to the bicycle was to and from school in Enschede. He started participating in junior races from 14 and from 19 to 23 he won 39 times as an amateur. The climax of his amateur career was gold in the Olympic road race in Munich in 1972, riding the final 40 km alone. He also won the Tour of Britain (Milk Race) that year.

== Professional career ==
Kuiper turned professional in 1973 with the small German team Haro-Rokado. His career took off in 1975 when he signed for the Dutch team, Frisol, where he got more chances to shine and formed a partnership with José De Cauwer (who worked for Kuiper in races) that lasted until 1980. The 1975 season saw Kuiper become world champion at Yvoir in Belgium, winning a tough race over 260 km, with 21 ascents of a 3 km (2 mi) climb.

Kuiper signed for TI–Raleigh in 1976 and finished second in the 1977 Tour de France 48 seconds behind Bernard Thévenet, who later admitted using steroids. Kuiper won the mountain stage at Alpe d'Huez, a feat he repeated in 1978. Kuiper finished fourth in the 1979 Tour and second in 1980 behind fellow Dutchman Joop Zoetemelk. That second place ended his best years as a stage race rider and in 1981 he moved to DAF Trucks and reinvented himself as a one-day classics rider. 1981 saw him win the Tour of Flanders and the Giro di Lombardia while in 1983 he won Paris–Roubaix, his 11th attempt at the hell of the north. In 1985, at 36, he won Milan–San Remo. His retirement came on 6 November 1988 at 39 at a small cyclo-cross at Oldenzaal in his home province.

== Team manager ==
After retirement Kuiper managed the small German pro squad Team Stuttgart between 1989 and 1990. In 1991 he became head of the Telekom team. In 1992 he was approached by Jim Ochowicz, manager of the American Motorola team, to become assistant team manager. Kuiper stayed with Motorola for four years. Since 1997 he has worked for the Rabobank team in public relations, as well as coaching the Dutch national team on occasions. He has two sons from his first marriage with Ine Nolten: Patrick Kuiper and Bjorn Kuiper. He lives with his second wife, Marianne, in Lonneker.

== Career achievements ==
=== Major results ===
1970
3rd Overall Tour of Yugoslavia

1st Stage 2

1971
1st Overall Circuit de Saône-et-Loire
1st Stage 5 Tour of Yugoslavia
1st Stage 1a Trois jours de Hénin Liétard
3rd Overall Rheinland-Pfalz Rundfahrt

1st Stage 7

1972
1st Road race, Olympic Games
1st Overall Milk Race
1st Overall Ronde van Drenthe
2nd Overall Tour du Limousin
10th Overall Trophée Peugeot de l'Avenir
1973
1st Stage 2 Tour de l'Aude
2nd Züri-Metzgete
4th Overall Tour de Luxembourg
5th Amstel Gold Race
10th Overall Volta a Catalunya
1974
1st Overall Tour d'Indre-et-Loire
1st GP Union Dortmund
2nd Paris–Camembert
7th Overall Paris–Nice
7th Overall Volta a Catalunya
9th Züri-Metzgete
1975
1st Road race, UCI Road World Championships
1st Road race, National Road Championships
2nd Grand Prix Le Télégramme de Brest
2nd Kampioenschap van Vlaanderen
3rd Trofeo Baracchi
4th Overall Tour de Luxembourg
5th Overall Vuelta a España

1st Stage 18

7th Paris–Brussels
9th Overall Tirreno–Adriatico
9th Amstel Gold Race
10th Overall Tour of the Netherlands
1976
Tour de France

1st Stages 4 & 5a (TTT)

2nd Overall Paris–Nice
2nd Overall Vuelta a Andalucía
2nd Omloop Het Volk
2nd Paris–Brussels
3rd Road race, National Road Championships
4th Paris–Roubaix
5th Liège–Bastogne–Liège
5th Amstel Gold Race
6th Overall Vuelta a España

1st Stage 4

1st Overall Tour de Suisse

1st Stage 3

10th Overall Tour of the Netherlands
1977
2nd Overall Tour de France

1st Stage 17

2nd Overall Vuelta a Andalucía
3rd Amstel Gold Race
3rd Paris–Tours
4th Road race, UCI Road World Championships
6th Paris–Brussels
4th Overall Four Days of Dunkirk
8th Overall Tour de Luxembourg
10th Paris–Roubaix
10th Tour of Flanders
1978
Tour de France

1st Stages 4 (TTT) & 16

2nd Overall Tour de Romandie
2nd Trofeo Baracchi
3rd Rund um den Henninger Turm
3rd Grand Prix des Nations
4th Overall Tour de Suisse
5th Overall Tour Méditerranéen
5th Amstel Gold Race
6th Liège–Bastogne–Liège
6th Paris–Roubaix
6th La Flèche Wallonne
7th Overall Paris–Nice
9th Overall Critérium du Dauphiné Libéré

1st Prologue

1979
3rd Paris–Roubaix
4th Overall Tour de France
4th Overall Critérium National de la Route
5th Overall Grand Prix du Midi Libre
6th Grand Prix de Wallonie
7th Overall Tour de l'Aude
7th Tour of Flanders
7th Grand Prix des Nations
8th Overall Four Days of Dunkirk
8th Overall Tour Méditerranéen
9th La Flèche Wallonne
10th Giro di Lombardia
10th Gent–Wevelgem
1980
2nd Overall Tour de France
2nd Overall Tour d'Indre-et-Loire
2nd Liège–Bastogne–Liège
4th Overall Critérium du Dauphiné Libéré
4th Paris–Brussels
5th Overall Grand Prix du Midi Libre
5th Giro di Lombardia
7th La Flèche Wallonne
7th Grand Prix de Wallonie
8th Gent–Wevelgem
1981
1st Giro di Lombardia
1st Tour of Flanders
2nd Overall Tour of the Netherlands
6th Paris–Roubaix
6th Giro dell'Emilia
6th Nationale Sluitingsprijs
7th E3 Prijs Vlaanderen
8th Paris–Tours
9th Rund um den Henninger Turm
1982
1st Grand Prix de Wallonie
2nd Overall Tour de Luxembourg
2nd Trofeo Baracchi
5th La Flèche Wallonne
6th Amstel Gold Race
6th Brabantse Pijl
6th Paris–Tours
7th Overall Paris–Nice
8th Paris–Brussels
9th Overall Tour de France
10th Giro di Lombardia
1983
1st Paris–Roubaix
2nd Trofeo Baracchi
4th Giro di Lombardia
5th Overall Vuelta a España
6th Liège–Bastogne–Liège
1984
6th Grand Prix de Fourmies
9th Paris–Roubaix
10th Züri-Metzgete
1985
1st Milan–San Remo
3rd Tour of Flanders
5th Bordeaux–Paris
6th Kuurne–Brussels–Kuurne
8th Paris–Roubaix
10th Trofeo Laigueglia
1986
10th E3 Prijs Vlaanderen
1987
5th Rund um den Henninger Turm
1988
3rd Veenendaal–Veenendaal Classic
8th Grand Prix d'Ouverture La Marseillaise
10th Overall Critérium International

==== Grand Tour general classification results timeline ====
Grand Tour	1973	1974	1975	1976	1977	1978	1979	1980	1981	1982	1983	1984	1985	1986	1987	1988
Vuelta a España	—	—	5	6	—	—	—	—	—	—	5	—	—	—	—	—
Giro d'Italia	16	DNF	—	—	—	—	—	—	—	—	—	—	—	22	44	—
Tour de France	—	—	11	DNF	2	DNF	4	2	30	9	DNF	56	DNF	—	—	95

DNF = Did Not Finish

== See also ==
- List of Dutch Olympic cyclists

Sporting positions
Preceded by Cees Priem	Dutch National Road Race Champion; 1975	Succeeded by Jan Raas
Awards
Preceded by Piet Kleine	Dutch Sportsman of the Year; 1977	Succeeded by Gerrie Knetemann
