= 1977 Grand Prix d'Automne =

Race details
- Dates: 25 September 1977
- Stages: 1
- Distance: 259 km (160.9 mi)
- Winning time: 5h 48' 58"

Results
	Winner	Joop Zoetemelk (NED)
	Second	Johan De Muynck (BEL)
	Third	Hennie Kuiper (NED)

The 1977 Grand Prix d'Automne was the 71st edition of the Paris–Tours cycle race and was held on 25 September 1977. The race started in Tours and finished in Versailles. The race was won by Joop Zoetemelk.

== General classification ==
Final general classification

Rank	Rider	Time
1	Joop Zoetemelk (NED)	5h 48' 58"
2	Johan De Muynck (BEL)	+ 0"
3	Hennie Kuiper (NED)	+ 0"
4	Roger De Vlaeminck (BEL)	+ 1' 01"
5	Jean-Pierre Danguillaume (FRA)	+ 1' 01"
6	Willy Teirlinck (BEL)	+ 1' 01"
7	Fons van Katwijk (NED)	+ 1' 05"
8	Cees Priem (NED)	+ 1' 05"
9	Rudy Pevenage (BEL)	+ 1' 05"
10	Jan van Katwijk (NED)	+ 1' 05"
