= Muur van Geraardsbergen =

Road in Geraardsbergen, Belgium

Coordinates: 50.7725°N 3.89°E

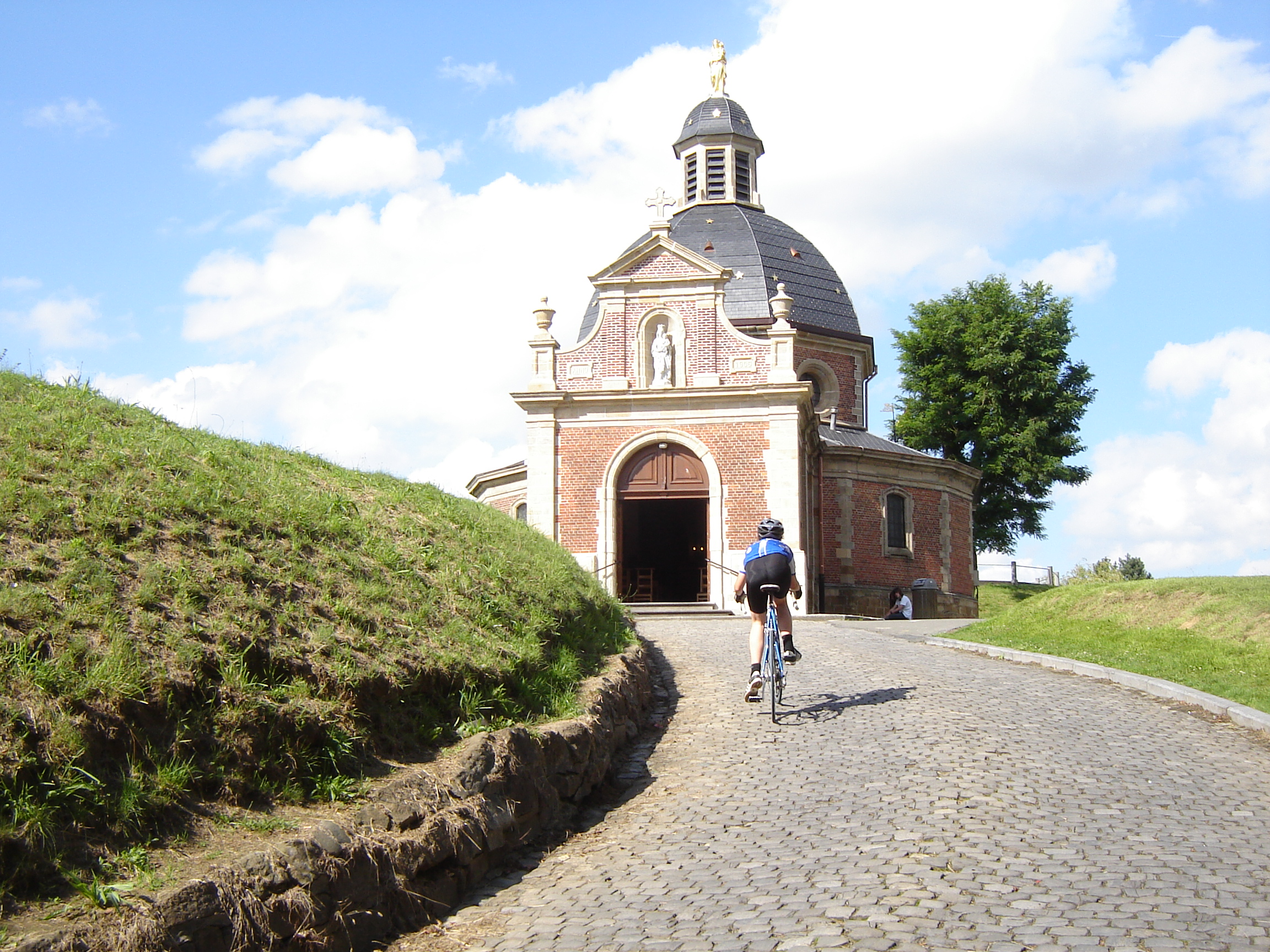
- The Muur van Geraardsbergen
- Location: Flanders, Belgium
- Start: Geraardsbergen
- Gain in altitude: 92 m (302 ft)
- Length of climb: 1,075 m (3,527 ft)
- Maximum elevation: 110 m (360 ft)
- Average gradient: 9.3 %
- Maximum gradient: 19.8 %

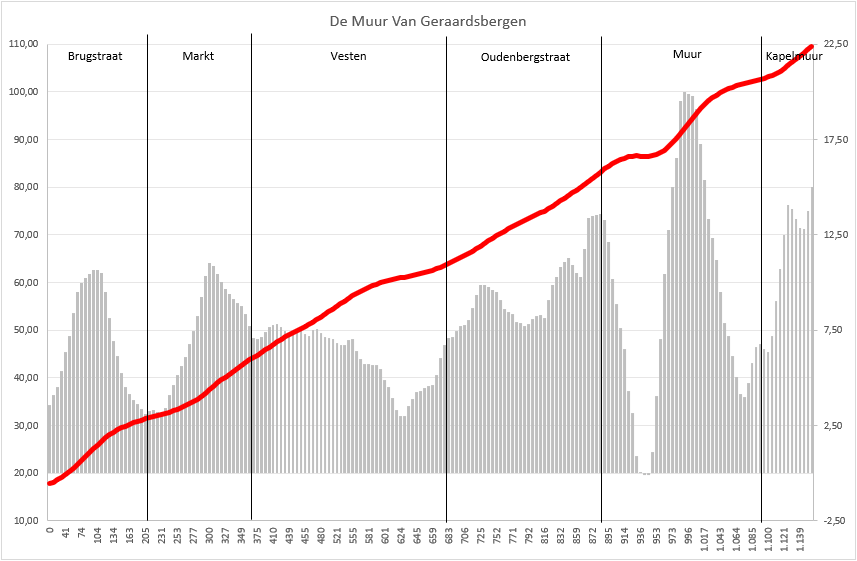
Profile and slope of the Muur van Geraardsbergen

The Muur van Geraardsbergen (English: Wall of Geraardsbergen/Grammont, French: Mur de Grammont) is a steep, narrow road with cobblestones in Geraardsbergen, Belgium. It is also known as Kapelmuur, Muur-Kapelmuur or simply Muur. The hill starts near the river Dender at 18 m and reaches the top of the Oudenberg at 110 m after 1,075 m at 9.3 per cent. This climb is often part of the Tour of Flanders professional cycling race.

== Tour of Flanders ==
The Muur van Geraardsbergen has often been a climb in the Tour of Flanders. It has been used since 1950, although not consistently until 1970. The "Muur" was the final climb in 1973 and 1974, before the finish in Meerbeke. An extra stretch to the chapel ('kapel' in Dutch) at the summit was added in 1981 and climb became known as the "Muur-Kapelmuur". It was a regular feature from 1981 until 2011.

From 1988 until 2011 it was the penultimate, and often decisive, climb and always followed by the Bosberg before the finish in Meerbeke. The Muur was removed from the 2012 race. With the finish in Oudenaarde, instead of Meerbeke, it was no longer possible to include it while the race was starting from Bruges.

When the start was moved to Antwerp for the 2017 race, the Muur was returned to the course, albeit as the eighth climb of the day, approximately 95km from the finish. It remained on the route from 2017 to 2019, far from the finale, but was dropped in 2020 and, as of 2026, had not returned.

== Other cycling races ==
The Muur was climbed in the 1960 Gent–Wevelgem and in 49 editions of Omloop Het Nieuwsblad. Since 2019, the Muur is the penultimate climb in Omloop Het Nieuwsblad.

The Tour de France visited the Muur in 2004 but did not climb the actual Muur of Geraardsbergen.

After omission of the Muur from the Tour of Flanders, it was announced that the climb would be in the 2012 E3 Prijs Vlaanderen, although not in the final.

Likewise the Muur was announced as the centerpiece of the final stage of the Eneco Tour for 2012, 2013, 2014, and the Muur has been used in a stage in all editions since then.

The Muur has been used as the start of the Transcontinental Race.

In 2019, it was used as the first climb of the Tour de France.
