= Koppenberg =

Hill in Belgium

Coordinates: 50.81057°N 3.5823°E

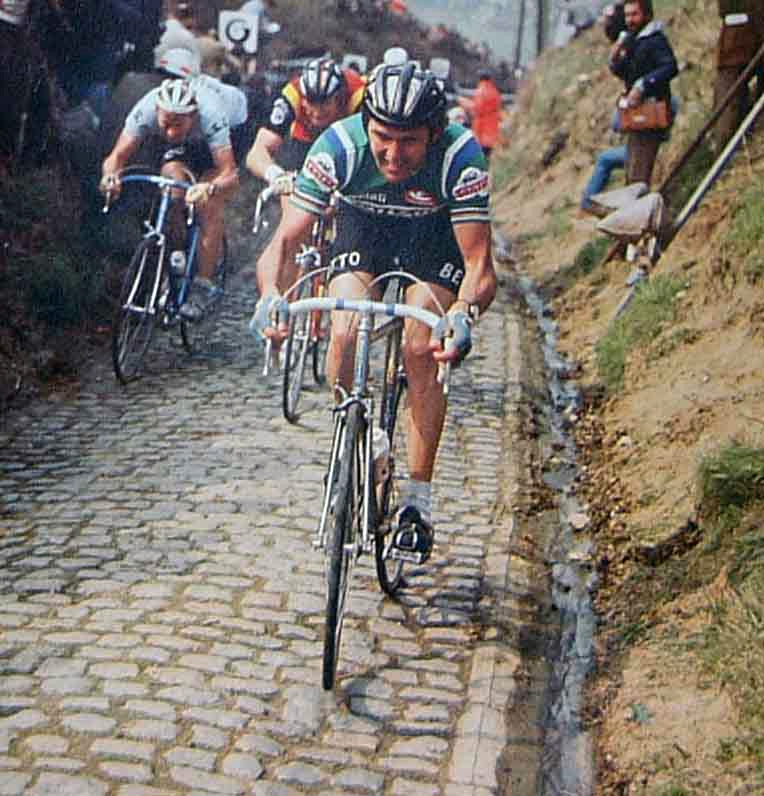
- Roger De Vlaeminck riding the Koppenberg during the Tour of Flanders on 9 April 1978
- Location: The Flemish Ardennes
- Start: Oudenaarde
- Gain in altitude: 64 m (210 ft)
- Length of climb: 600 m (2,000 ft)
- Maximum elevation: 77 m (253 ft)
- Average gradient: 11.6 %
- Maximum gradient: 22 %

Koppenberg (literally "Heads Mountain") is a 77 m (253 ft) high hill in Oudenaarde, the Flemish Ardennes, Belgium. "Koppen" is an abbreviation for cobblestones which in Dutch slang language are called kinderkoppen, or "children's heads". This climb is part of the route of the Tour of Flanders professional cycling race and feared by many because of its steepness (22% on the trickiest parts) and because of its cobblestones. This makes the Koppenberg difficult even for top professionals. Quite often, riders slow to the point of losing their balance, especially those at the back of the peloton who have to dismount and scramble to the top on foot.

In the 2006 Tour of Flanders, it was on kilometer 185 of 259. Even if a breakaway forms on the Koppenberg it is difficult for riders to hold off the peloton in the finishing stages. In the 2012 Tour of Flanders the Koppenberg was moved to 60 km from the finish line and raising its importance.

== Koppenberg history ==
Koppenberg was first climbed by the Tour of Flanders riders in 1976 and featured annually until 1987.

In that year, Danish rider Jesper Skibby broke away from the peloton early in the race and had been riding by himself when he approached the Koppenberg. With a lead of nearly two minutes, he began the climb but when he started to slow, the race commissaire following close behind in his car—pressured by the encroaching peloton—ordered his driver to move so they knocked Skibby who fell to the ground then the car ran over his back wheel, just narrowly missing his leg and ending his race.

After the incident, the Koppenberg was excluded for 15 years. Following renovations, which included widening the road and re-paving it, the climb was re-introduced in 2002.

The Koppenberg was again excluded from the Tour of Flanders because of its deteriorating and unsafe conditions in 2007. Following further renovations that year, it was again included in the 2008 edition of the race, and has been featured in each edition since. In 2022, the Koppenberg was added to the women's edition of the race for the first time, featuring in every subsequent edition.

The Koppenberg hillside is also used for the annual Cyclo-cross Koppenberg race. The cyclo-cross course follows only part of the cobbled road, using some of the surrounding fields and roads for the other sections of the course.

== Gallery ==
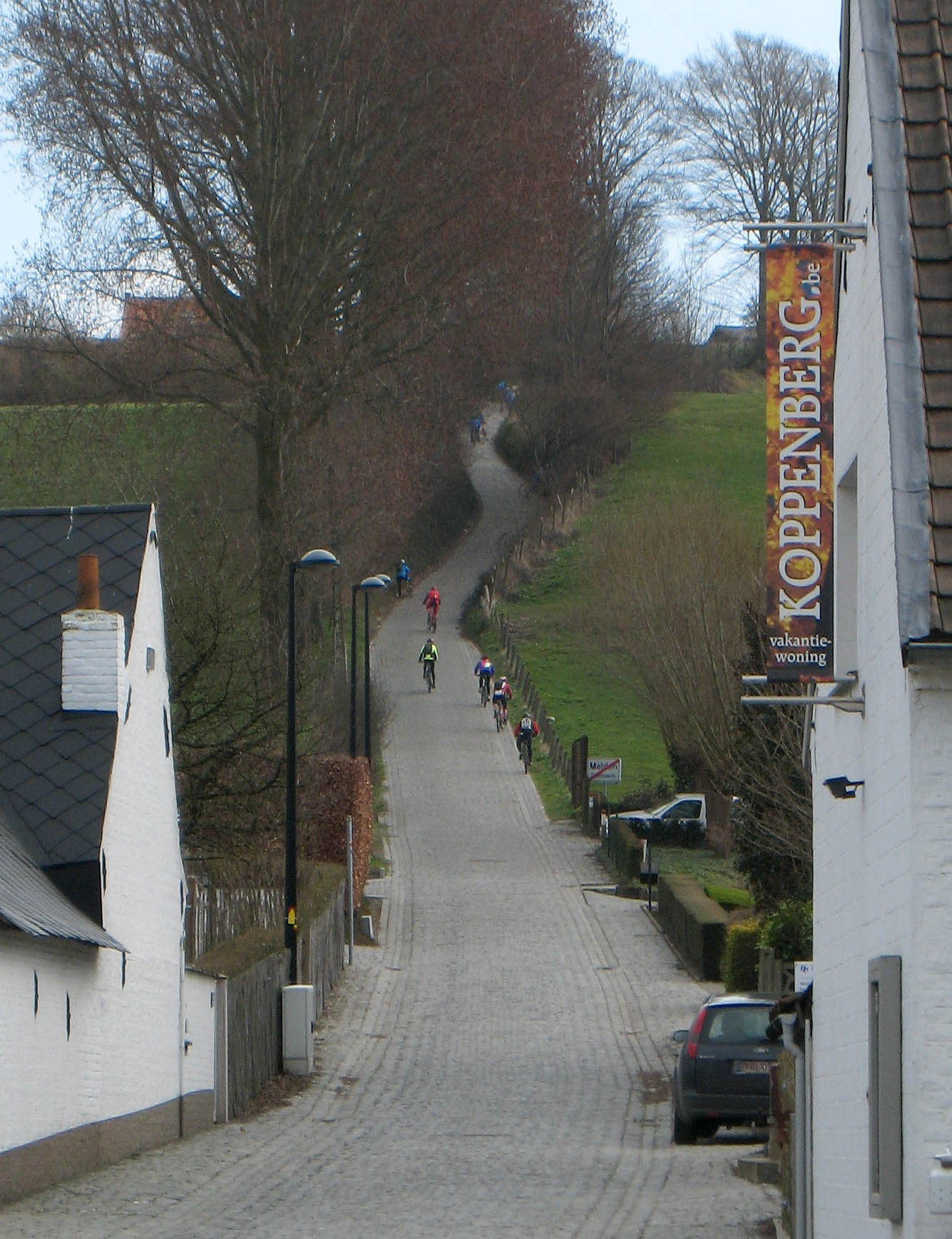
The Koppenberg from the bottom of the hill

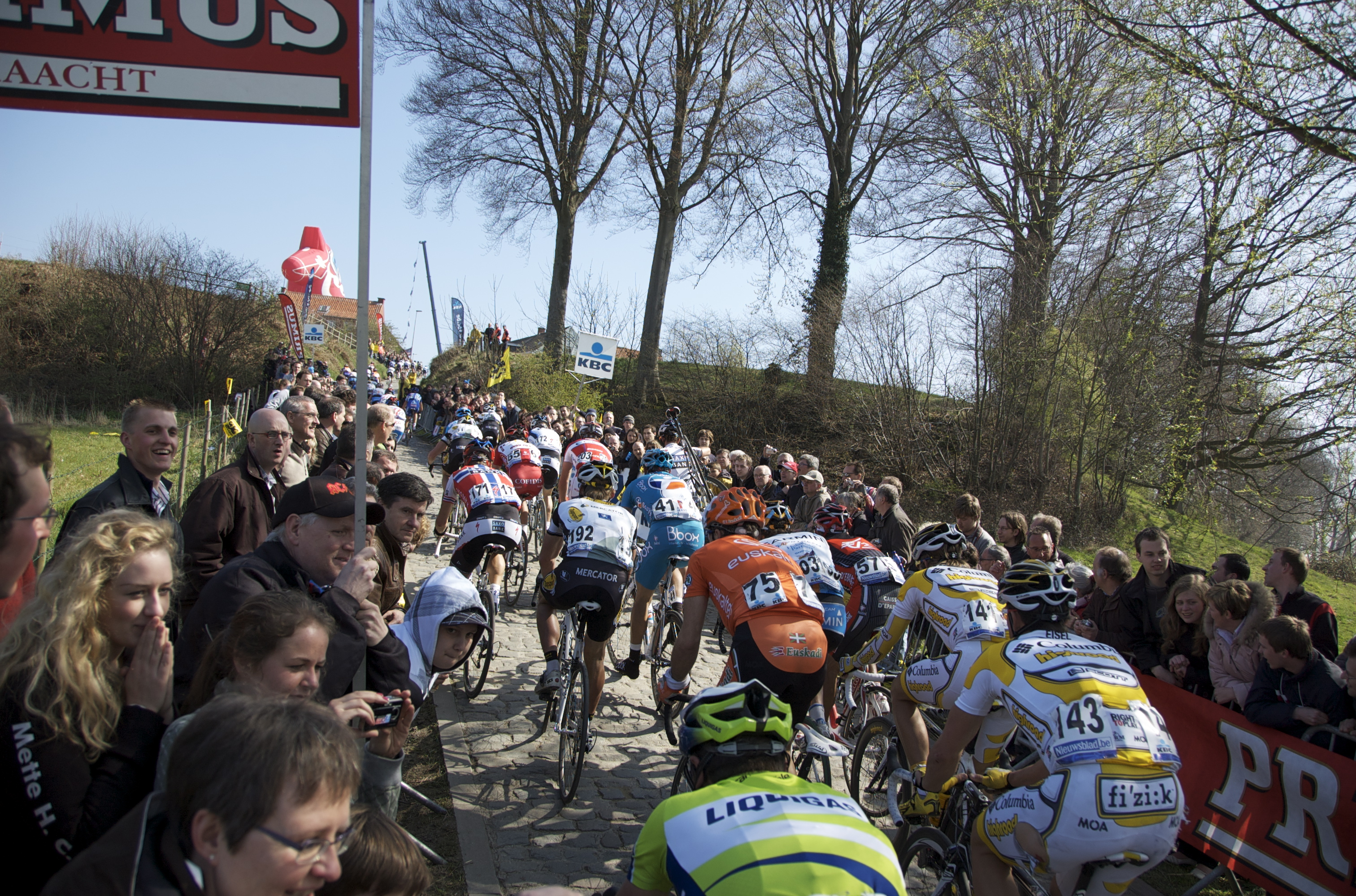
The Koppenberg during the 2009 Tour of Flanders

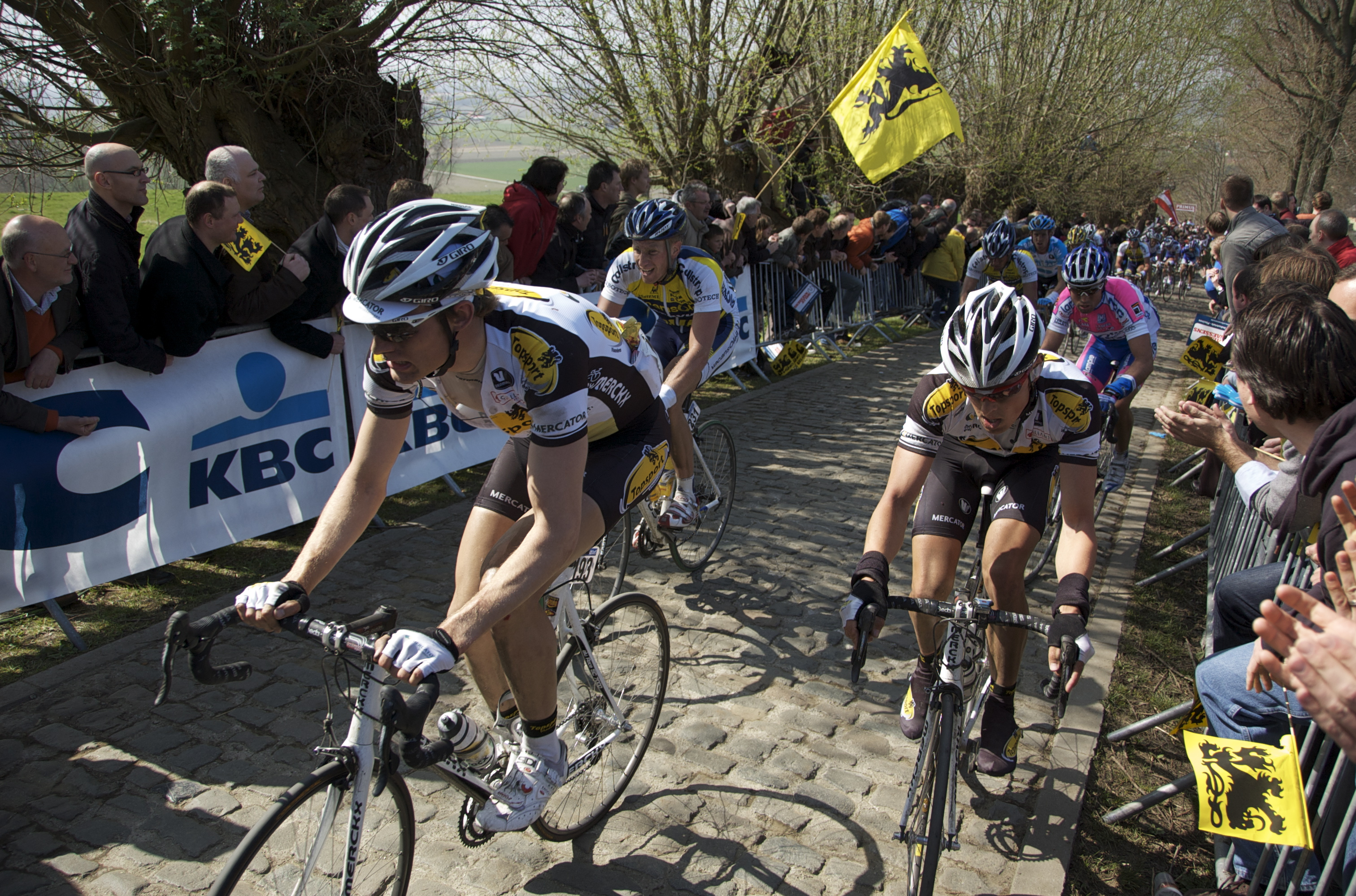
The Koppenberg during the 2009 Tour of Flanders

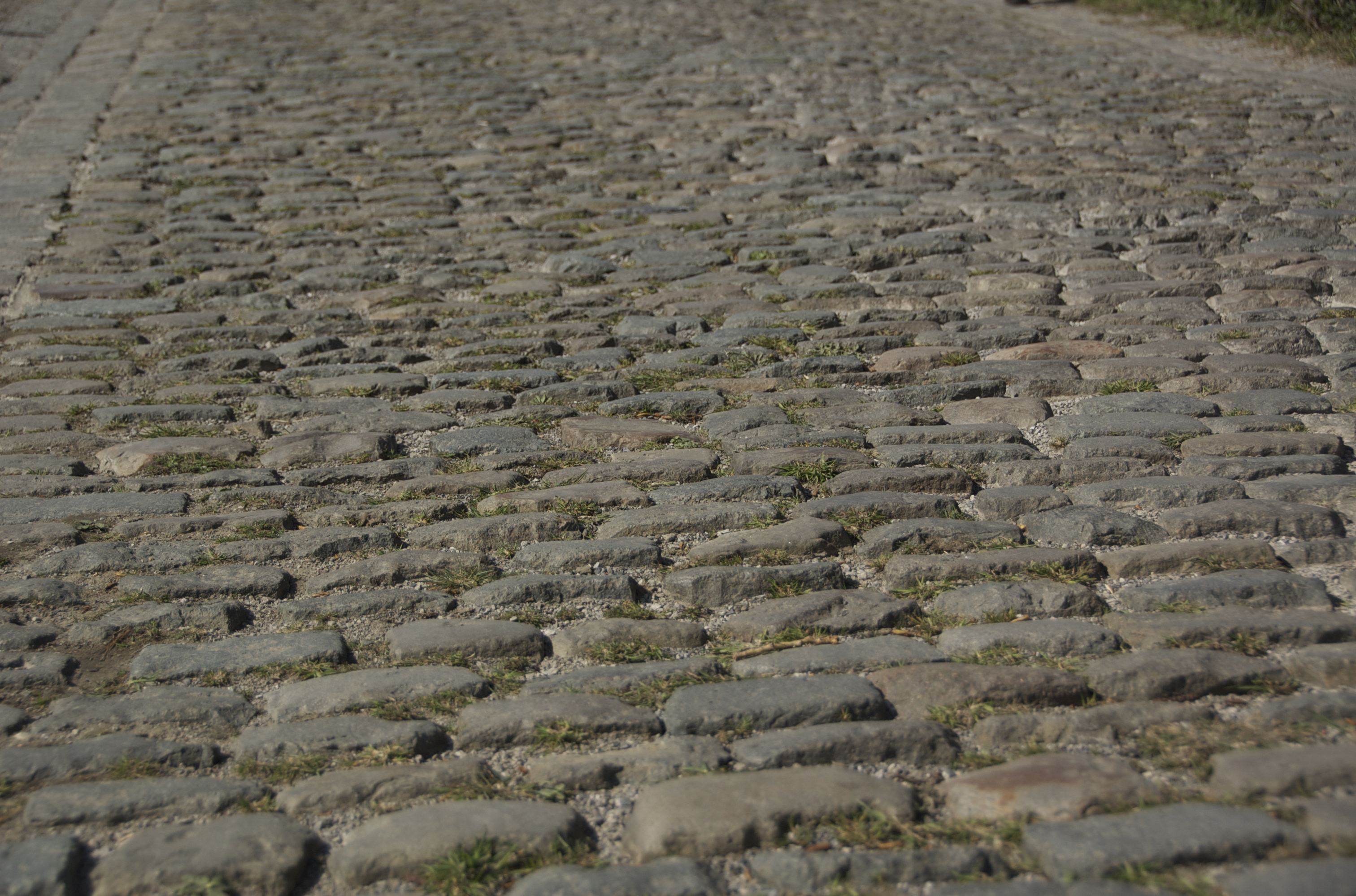
Closeup of the Koppenberg's cobblestones

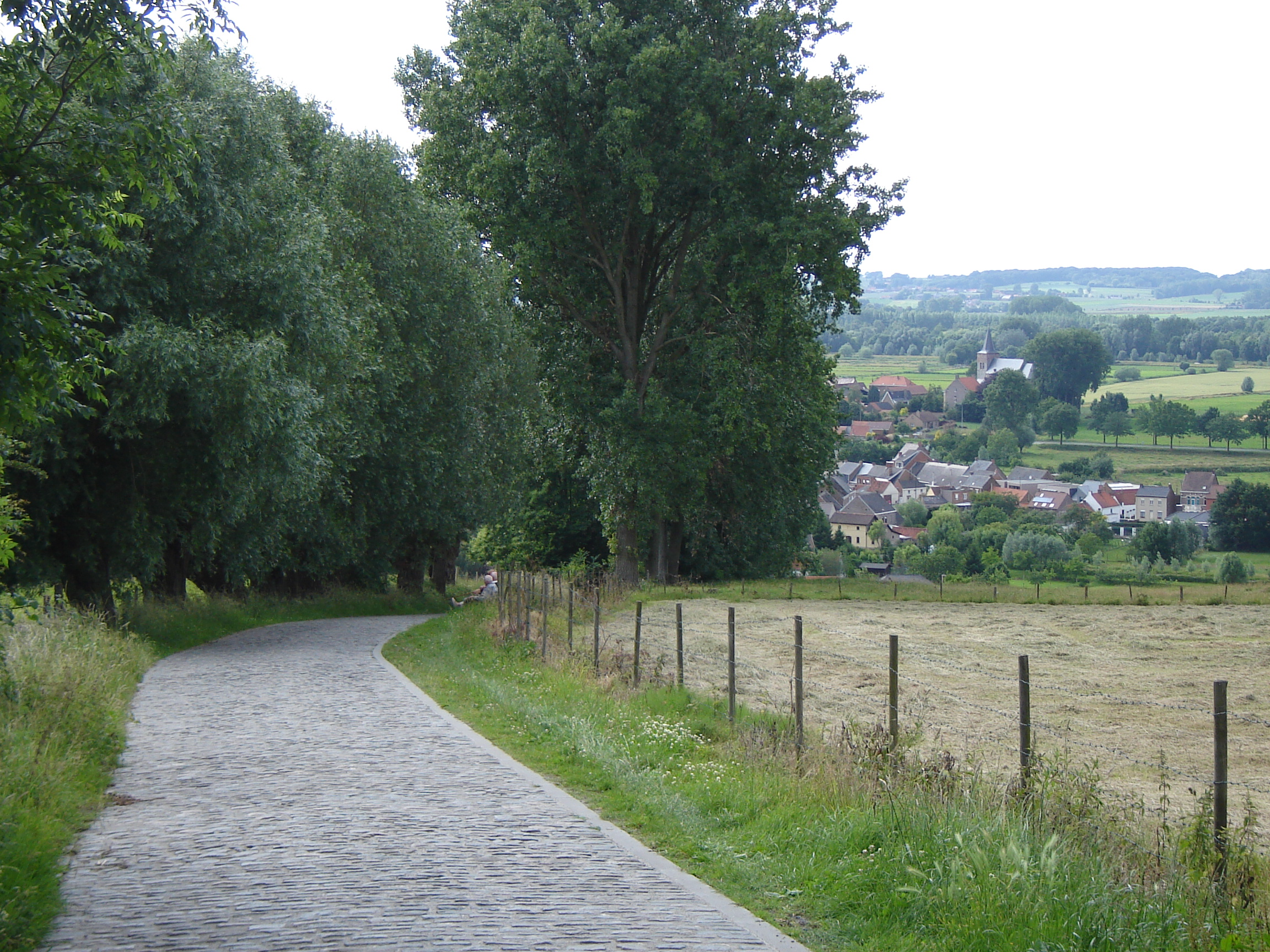
View from the top of the hill
