= Eikenberg =

Hill in Belgium

Coordinates: 50.8233°N 3.6404°E

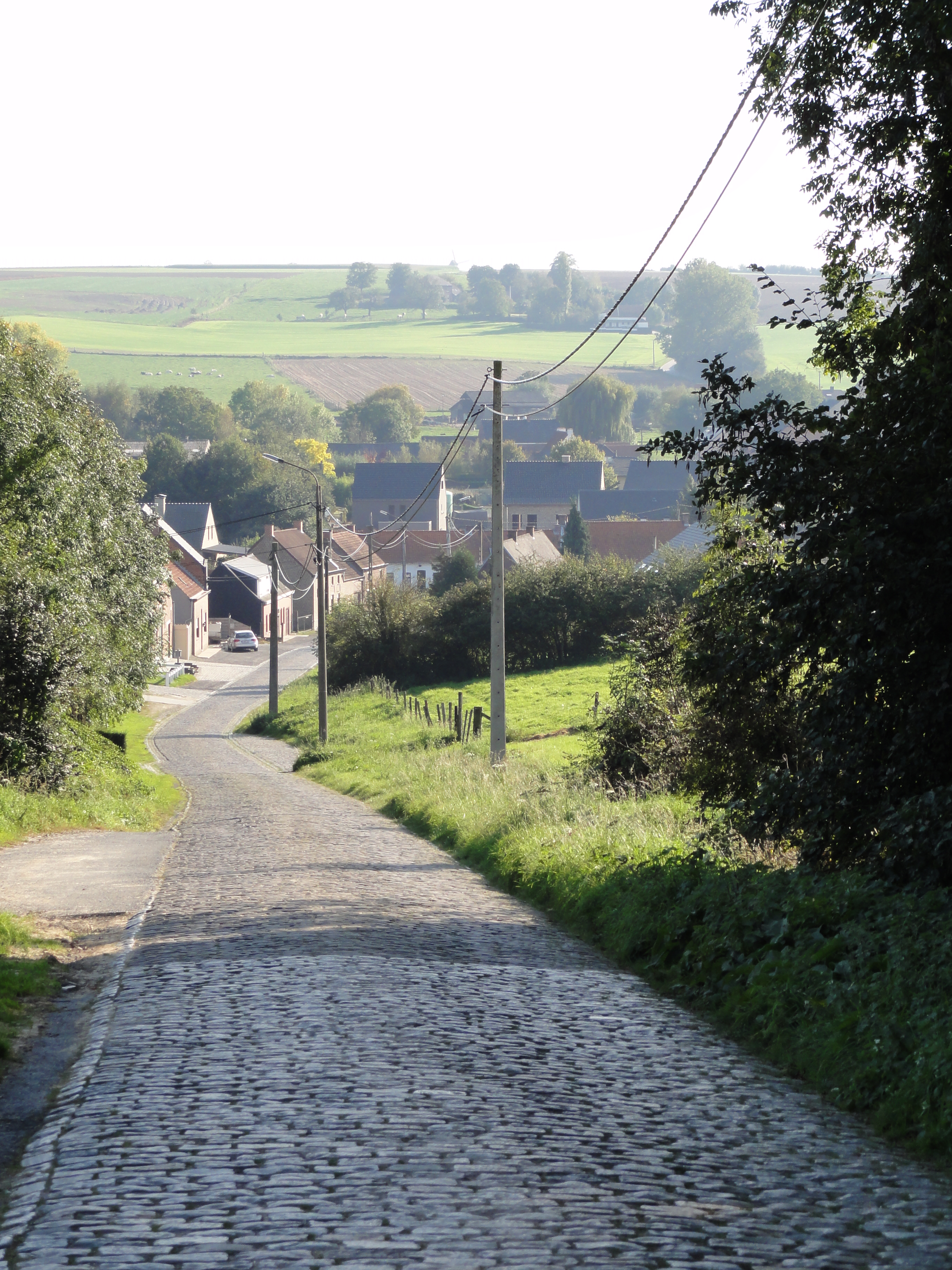
- Eikenberg in Maarkedal
- Location: Flanders; Belgium
- Start: Etikhove, Maarkedal
- Gain in altitude: 67.7 m (222 ft)
- Length of climb: 1.252 km (0.778 mi)
- Maximum elevation: 82 m (269 ft)
- Average gradient: 5.8 %
- Maximum gradient: 10 %

The Eikenberg (English: Oak Hill) is a hill and road in the municipality of Maarkedal, in the Belgian province of East Flanders. With an 82 m altitude top, it is one of many hill formations in the Flemish Ardennes, in the south of East Flanders.

The slopes of the hill are paved in cobbles, with a road gradually winding upwards from the Maarke brook to the top in Kerzelare village, 3 km east of Oudenaarde. The top of the climb is on the intercity road between Brakel and Oudenaarde. The cobbled climb is one of the regular sites in Flemish cycling races in springtime. In 1995 the road of the Eikenberg was classified as a protected monument.

== Cycling ==
The site is best known from road bicycle racing, as it is a regular climb in the Tour of Flanders. The Taaienberg was first included in the course in 1956, and has since often been included, although occasionally it is not run. It is a fairly long climb at 1200 meter, relatively shallow at 5.8% average, but its cobbled surface is the main difficulty of the climb.

In total the Eikenberg has been included in the Tour of Flanders route 40 times (1956-2015). In 2014 and 2015 it was the third climb of the day, situated between the Kortekeer and Wolvenberg.

Eikenberg is also a fixed location in Omloop Het Volk and is sometimes included in E3 Harelbeke, Dwars door Vlaanderen and Three Days of De Panne.

== Gallery ==
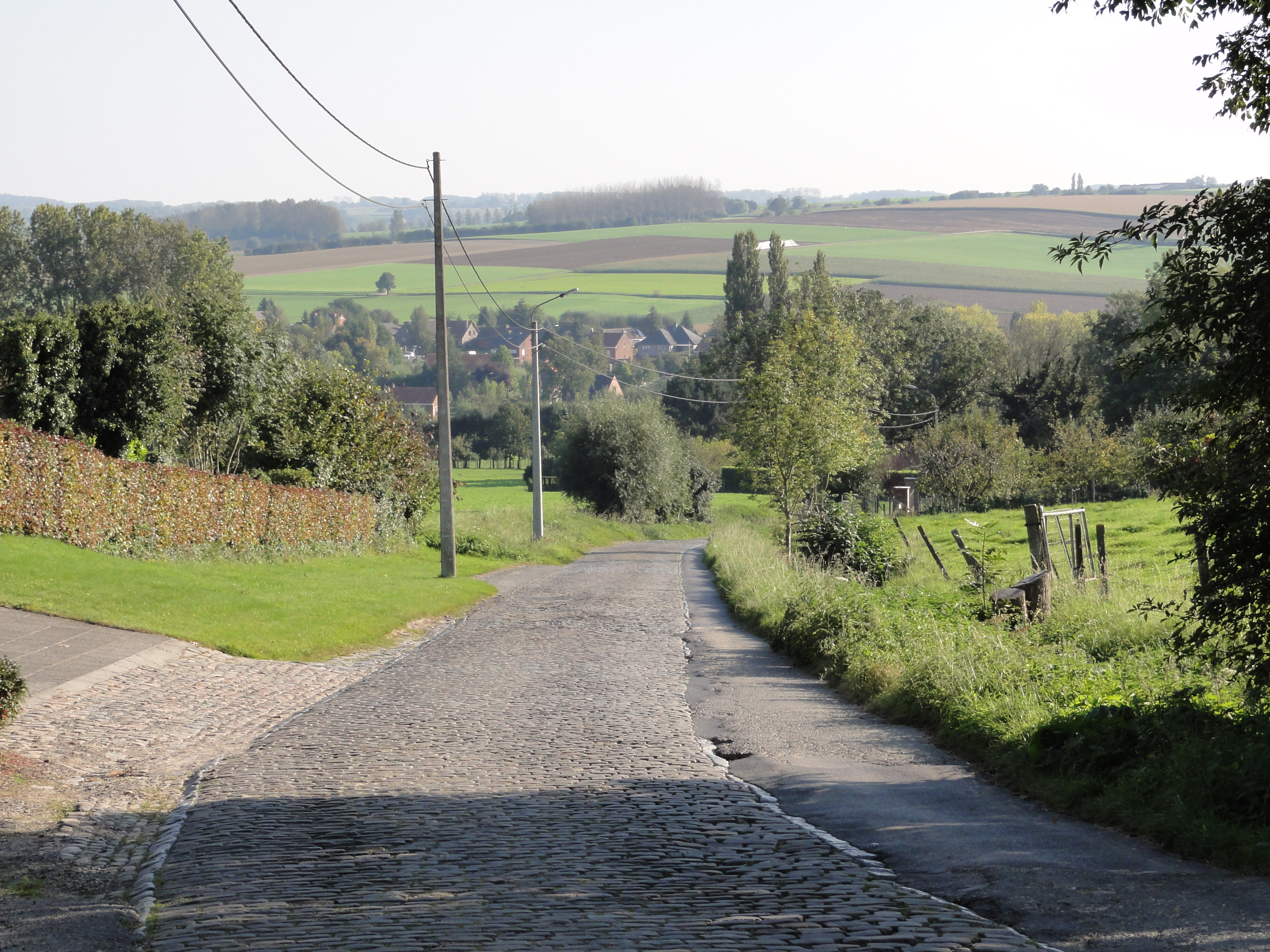

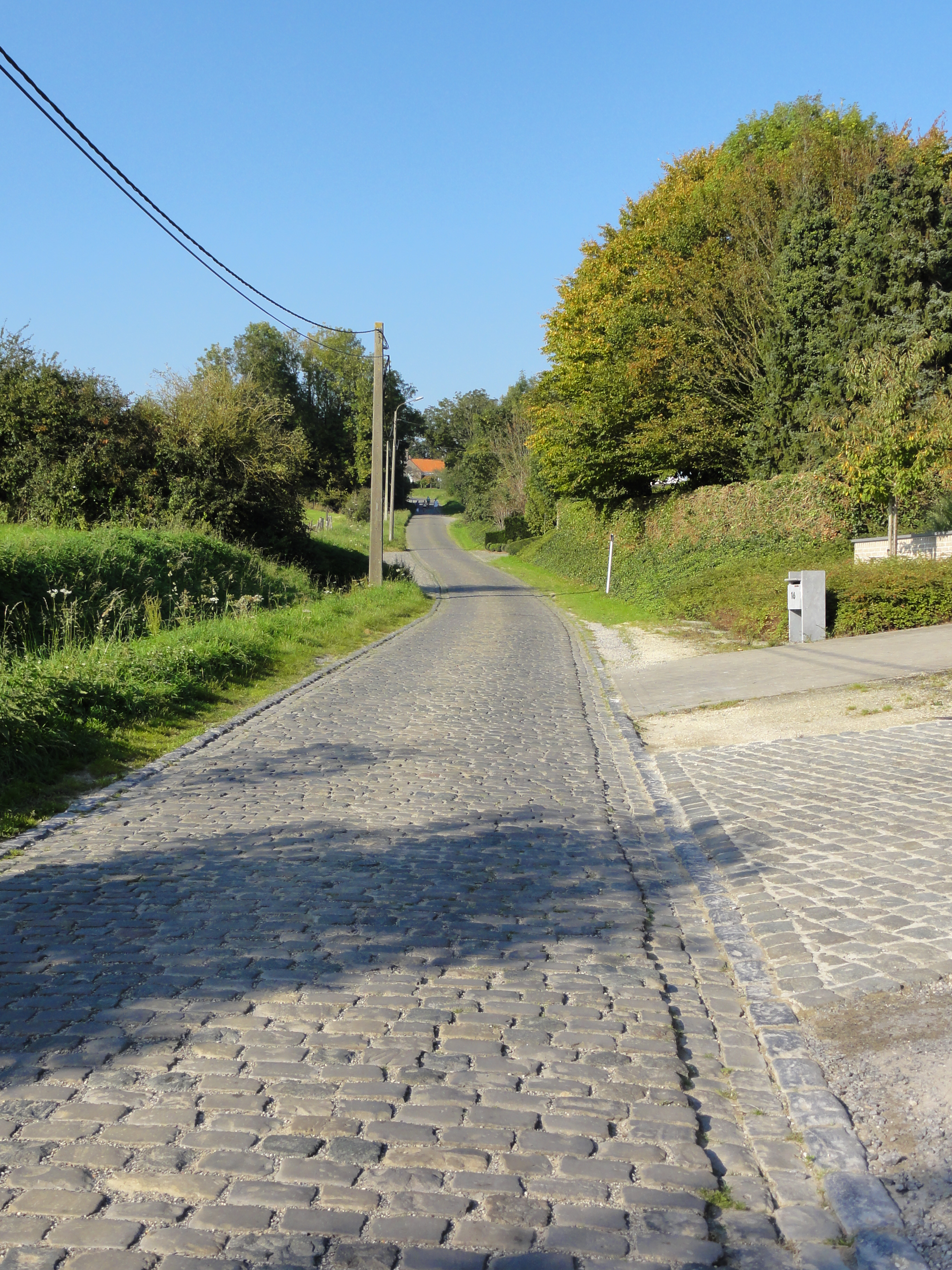
