= Meerbeke =

- Village
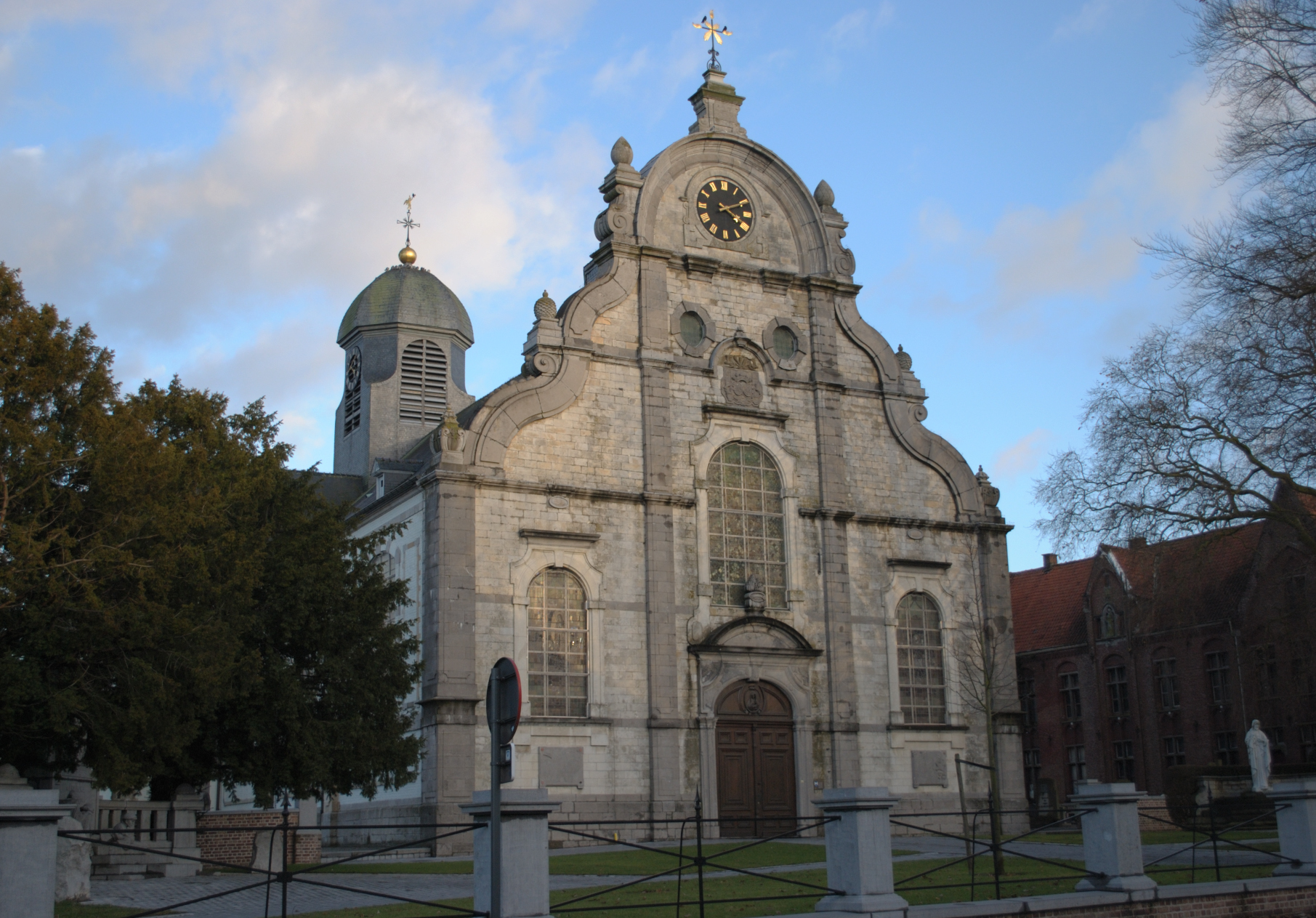
- Church of Saint Peter at Meerbeeke, Belgium

- Location in Belgium
- Coordinates: 50°49′28″N 4°02′25″E
- Country: Belgium
- Region: Flemish Region
- Province: East Flanders
- Arrondissement: Aalst
- Municipality: Ninove

Area
  - Total: 10.56 km^{2} (4.08 sq mi)

Population (2021)
  - Total: 5,888
  - Density: 557.6/km^{2} (1,444/sq mi)
- Time zone: CET

Meerbeke is a village in the Denderstreek in the province of East Flanders in Belgium. Administratively it is part of the municipality of Ninove. This rural community is located along the Dender River on the western border of what is known as "Pajottenland". With a total surface of 1056ha it is the second largest village in Ninove (behind Denderwindeke). With 5.888 inhabitants (in 2021) it's the most populated village in Ninove, next to the centre of Ninove itself.

It is perhaps most known as the arrival location for the Flemish cycling race the Tour of Flanders (1973-2011). Meerbeke used to be an independent municipality until 1977 when it was merged into Ninove.
