= List of teams and cyclists in the 1982 Tour de France =

List of cyclists

In response to the finish in 1981, for the 1982 Tour de France, French minister of sports Edwige Avice objected to the amount of advertising in the race, and suggested the Tour to return to the national team format. The Tour organisation needed the money brought in by the sponsors, and no changes were made to the team structure.

The Tour organisation decided to start with 17 teams, each with 10 cyclists, for a total of 170, a new record. Tour director Félix Lévitan suggested to reduce the number of cyclists by starting with teams of 9 cyclists, but this was rejected. Teams could submit a request to join until 15 May 1982. To promote cycling in the United States of America, the American national cycling team would automatically be accepted, but the American team made no request.

The following 17 teams each sent 10 cyclists, for a total of 170:

- Renault–Elf–Gitane
- La Redoute–Motobécane
- TI–Raleigh–Campagnolo–Merckx
- Capri Sonne–Campagnolo–Merckx
- Peugeot–Shell–Michelin
- Wickes Bouwmarkt–Splendor
- Vermeer–Thijs–Gios
- SEM–France Loire–Campagnolo
- Sunair–Colnago–Campagnolo
- DAF Trucks–Tévé Blad–Rossin
- Coop–Mercier–Mavic
- Teka
- Wolber–Spidel
- Puch–Eurotex–Campagnolo
- Inoxpran–Pentole Posate
- Cilo–Aufina
- Hoonved–Botecchia

Hinault, who had won the Tour in 1978, 1979 and 1981, and left the 1980 Tour in leading position, was the clear favourite for the victory. In those other years, Hinault had won several races before the Tour, but in 1982 he had only won one major race, the 1982 Giro d'Italia. Hinault tried to be the fourth cyclist, after Fausto Coppi, Jacques Anquetil and Eddy Merckx, to win the Giro-Tour double.

Notable absent was Lucien Van Impe, who was second in the 1981 Tour de France, winning the mountains classification. Since the 1969 Tour de France, Van Impe had started each edition, winning the general classification in the 1976 Tour and the mountains classification five times. Van Impe wanted to join, but his team Metauro was not invited, as the organisation considered it not strong enough to ride both the Giro and the Tour. Van Impe tried to find a team to hire him only for the 1982 Tour, but was not successful.

== Start list ==
=== By team ===
Renault–Elf–Gitane
No.	Rider	Pos.
1	Bernard Hinault (FRA)	1
2	Hubert Arbès (FRA)	86
3	Charly Bérard (FRA)	16
4	Patrick Bonnet (FRA)	41
5	Lucien Didier (LUX)	25
6	Maurice Le Guilloux (FRA)	27
7	Marc Madiot (FRA)	30
8	Pascal Poisson (FRA)	50
9	Jean-François Rodriguez (FRA)	26
10	Alain Vigneron (FRA)	35

La Redoute–Motobécane
No.	Rider	Pos.
11	Robert Alban (FRA)	11
12	Pierre Bazzo (FRA)	39
13	Johan De Muynck (BEL)	28
14	Etienne De Wilde (BEL)	DNF
15	Pascal Guyot (FRA)	96
16	Christian Jourdan (FRA)	DNF
17	Paul Sherwen (GBR)	111
18	Bernard Vallet (FRA)	12
19	Jean-Luc Vandenbroucke (BEL)	DNF
20	Didier Vanoverschelde (FRA)	42

TI–Raleigh–Campagnolo–Merckx
No.	Rider	Pos.
21	Johan van der Velde (NED)	3
22	Frank Hoste (BEL)	DNF
23	Ludo De Keulenaer (BEL)	61
24	Gerrie Knetemann (NED)	47
25	Henk Lubberding (NED)	46
26	Ludo Peeters (BEL)	34
27	Jan Raas (NED)	DNF
28	Leo van Vliet (NED)	52
29	Gerard Veldscholten (NED)	32
30	Ad Wijnands (NED)	53

Capri Sonne–Campagnolo–Merckx
No.	Rider	Pos.
31	Peter Winnen (NED)	4
32	Gregor Braun (FRG)	DNF
33	Ludo Delcroix (BEL)	91
34	Theo de Rooij (NED)	19
35	Ronald De Witte (BEL)	63
36	Eric McKenzie (NZL)	87
37	Rudy Pevenage (BEL)	73
38	Eric Van De Wiele (BEL)	68
39	Dirk Wayenberg (BEL)	117
40	Jostein Wilmann (NOR)	DNF

Peugeot–Shell–Michelin
No.	Rider	Pos.
41	Jean-René Bernaudeau (FRA)	13
42	Phil Anderson (AUS)	5
43	Bernard Bourreau (FRA)	DNF
44	Frédéric Brun (FRA)	66
45	André Chalmel (FRA)	115
46	Gilbert Duclos-Lassalle (FRA)	60
47	Michel Laurent (FRA)	48
48	Hubert Linard (FRA)	56
49	Patrick Perret (FRA)	38
50	Pascal Simon (FRA)	20

Wickes Bouwmarkt–Splendor
No.	Rider	Pos.
51	Claude Criquielion (BEL)	DNF
52	Johnny Broers (NED)	DNF
53	Luc Desmet (BEL)	DNF
54	Eddy Planckaert (BEL)	DNF
55	Walter Planckaert (BEL)	DNF
56	Jos Schipper (NED)	DNF
57	Eugène Urbany (LUX)	97
58	Benny Van Brabant (BEL)	118
59	Jean-Philippe Vandenbrande (BEL)	54
60	Paul Wellens (BEL)	DNF

Vermeer–Thijs–Gios
No.	Rider	Pos.
61	Fons De Wolf (BEL)	31
62	Roger De Cnijf (BEL)	93
63	Franky De Gendt (BEL)	DNF
64	Jos Deschoenmaecker (BEL)	DNF
65	Jos Jacobs (BEL)	DNF
66	Louis Luyten (BEL)	92
67	Danny Schoobaert (BEL)	84
68	Adri van Houwelingen (NED)	40
69	Jan van Houwelingen (NED)	99
70	Pol Verschuere (BEL)	81

SEM–France Loire–Campagnolo
No.	Rider	Pos.
71	Sean Kelly (IRL)	15
72	René Bittinger (FRA)	44
73	Jonathan Boyer (USA)	23
74	André Chappuis (FRA)	114
75	Jean-François Chaurin (FRA)	49
76	Patrick Clerc (FRA)	77
77	Guy Gallopin (FRA)	DNF
78	Dominique Garde (FRA)	64
79	Hubert Graignic (FRA)	107
80	Marcel Tinazzi (FRA)	43

Sunair–Colnago–Campagnolo
No.	Rider	Pos.
81	Daniel Willems (BEL)	7
82	Alain De Roo (BEL)	123
83	Werner Devos (BEL)	125
84	Ludo Frijns (BEL)	DNF
85	Guy Janiszewski (BEL)	101
86	Frans Van Vlierberghe (BEL)	108
87	Gery Verlinden (BEL)	DNF
88	Patrick Versluys (BEL)	94
89	Jan Wijnants (BEL)	DNF
90	Ludwig Wijnants (BEL)	75

DAF Trucks–Tévé Blad–Rossin
No.	Rider	Pos.
91	Hennie Kuiper (NED)	9
92	Hendrik Devos (BEL)	88
93	Marc Dierickx (BEL)	85
94	Marcel Laurens (BEL)	100
95	René Martens (BEL)	24
96	Guy Nulens (BEL)	22
97	Bert Oosterbosch (NED)	DNF
98	William Tackaert (BEL)	DNF
99	Adri van der Poel (NED)	102
100	Peter Zijerveld (NED)	DNF

Coop–Mercier–Mavic
No.	Rider	Pos.
101	Joop Zoetemelk (NED)	2
102	Kim Andersen (DEN)	17
103	Yvon Bertin (FRA)	124
104	Régis Clère (FRA)	45
105	Jean-Louis Gauthier (FRA)	104
106	Pierre Le Bigaut (FRA)	59
107	Christian Levavasseur (FRA)	DNF
108	Raymond Martin (FRA)	8
109	Pierre-Henri Menthéour (FRA)	51
110	Jacques Michaud (FRA)	18

Teka
No.	Rider	Pos.
111	Marino Lejarreta (ESP)	37
112	Bernardo Alfonsel (ESP)	67
113	Francisco Albelda (ESP)	DNF
114	Juan-Carlos Alonso (ESP)	122
115	Antonio Coll (ESP)	70
116	Alberto Fernández (ESP)	10
117	Ismael Lejarreta (ESP)	57
118	José Luis Rodríguez Inguanzo (ESP)	DNF
119	Modesto Urrutibeazcoa (ESP)	DNF
120	Felipe Yáñez (ESP)	110

Wolber–Spidel
No.	Rider	Pos.
121	Sven-Åke Nilsson (SWE)	14
122	Dominique Arnaud (FRA)	36
123	Jean Chassang (FRA)	80
124	Marc Durant (FRA)	62
125	Marc Gomez (FRA)	71
126	Gérard Kerbrat (FRA)	DNF
127	Jean-François Rault (FRA)	74
128	Christian Seznec (FRA)	29
129	Pierre-Raymond Villemiane (FRA)	55
130	Claude Vincendeau (FRA)	89

Puch–Eurotex–Campagnolo
No.	Rider	Pos.
131	Stefan Mutter (SUI)	21
132	Reimund Dietzen (FRG)	DNF
133	Mike Gutmann (SUI)	79
134	Siegfried Hekimi (SUI)	103
135	Hans Känel (SUI)	DNF
136	Erwin Lienhard (SUI)	95
137	Harald Maier (AUT)	78
138	Hans Neumayer (FRG)	DNF
139	Klaus-Peter Thaler (FRG)	90
140	Josef Wehrli (SUI)	69

Inoxpran–Pentole Posate
No.	Rider	Pos.
141	Giovanni Battaglin (ITA)	DNF
142	Giuliano Biatta (ITA)	120
143	Guido Bontempi (ITA)	DNF
144	Alfredo Chinetti (ITA)	109
145	Alfonso Dal Pian (ITA)	DNF
146	Bruno Leali (ITA)	76
147	Luciano Loro (ITA)	58
148	Luigino Moro (ITA)	DNF
149	Amilcare Sgalbazzi (ITA)	DNF
150	Carlo Tonon (ITA)	116

Cilo–Aufina
No.	Rider	Pos.
151	Beat Breu (SUI)	6
152	Thierry Bolle (SUI)	112
153	Serge Demierre (SUI)	72
154	Antonio Ferretti (SUI)	65
155	Gilbert Glaus (SUI)	105
156	Jean-Marie Grezet (SUI)	DNF
157	Patrick Moerlen (SUI)	83
158	Cédric Rossier (SUI)	82
159	Marcel Russenberger (SUI)	119
160	Julius Thalmann (SUI)	98

Hoonved–Botecchia
No.	Rider	Pos.
161	Mario Beccia (ITA)	33
162	Fiorenzo Aliverti (ITA)	113
163	Antonio Bevilacqua (ITA)	106
164	Daniel Gisiger (SUI)	DNF
165	Silvestro Milani (ITA)	DNF
166	Benedetto Patellaro (ITA)	DNF
167	Luciano Rui (ITA)	DNF
168	Enzo Serpelloni (ITA)	121
169	Dietrich Thurau (FRG)	DNF
170	Rik Van Linden (BEL)	DNF

=== By rider ===
Legend
No.	Starting number worn by the rider during the Tour
Pos.	Position in the general classification
DNF	Denotes a rider who did not finish

No.	Name	Nationality	Team	Pos.	Time	Ref
1	Bernard Hinault	France	Renault–Elf–Gitane	1	92h 08' 46"	
2	Hubert Arbès	France	Renault–Elf–Gitane	86	+ 1h 52' 06"	
3	Charly Bérard	France	Renault–Elf–Gitane	16	+ 31' 35"	
4	Patrick Bonnet	France	Renault–Elf–Gitane	41	+ 57' 16"	
5	Lucien Didier	Luxembourg	Renault–Elf–Gitane	25	+ 44' 37"	
6	Maurice Le Guilloux	France	Renault–Elf–Gitane	27	+ 46' 58"	
7	Marc Madiot	France	Renault–Elf–Gitane	30	+ 49' 28"	
8	Pascal Poisson	France	Renault–Elf–Gitane	50	+ 1h 08' 24"	
9	Jean-François Rodriguez	France	Renault–Elf–Gitane	26	+ 45' 31"	
10	Alain Vigneron	France	Renault–Elf–Gitane	35	+ 53' 48"	
11	Robert Alban	France	La Redoute–Motobécane	11	+ 17' 21"	
12	Pierre Bazzo	France	La Redoute–Motobécane	39	+ 55' 30"	
13	Johan De Muynck	Belgium	La Redoute–Motobécane	28	+ 48' 51"	
14	Etienne De Wilde	Belgium	La Redoute–Motobécane	DNF	—	
15	Pascal Guyot	France	La Redoute–Motobécane	96	+ 2h 09' 00"	
16	Christian Jourdan	France	La Redoute–Motobécane	DNF	—	
17	Paul Sherwen	Great Britain	La Redoute–Motobécane	111	+ 2h 22' 54"	
18	Bernard Vallet	France	La Redoute–Motobécane	12	+ 19' 52"	
19	Jean-Luc Vandenbroucke	Belgium	La Redoute–Motobécane	DNF	—	
20	Didier Vanoverschelde	France	La Redoute–Motobécane	42	+ 1h 00' 00"	
21	Johan van der Velde	Netherlands	TI–Raleigh–Campagnolo–Merckx	3	+ 8' 59"	
22	Frank Hoste	Belgium	TI–Raleigh–Campagnolo–Merckx	DNF	—	
23	Ludo De Keulenaer	Belgium	TI–Raleigh–Campagnolo–Merckx	61	+ 1h 24' 55"	
24	Gerrie Knetemann	Netherlands	TI–Raleigh–Campagnolo–Merckx	47	+ 1h 03' 41"	
25	Henk Lubberding	Netherlands	TI–Raleigh–Campagnolo–Merckx	46	+ 1h 02' 29"	
26	Ludo Peeters	Belgium	TI–Raleigh–Campagnolo–Merckx	34	+ 52' 59"	
27	Jan Raas	Netherlands	TI–Raleigh–Campagnolo–Merckx	DNF	—	
28	Leo van Vliet	Netherlands	TI–Raleigh–Campagnolo–Merckx	52	+ 1h 12' 18"	
29	Gerard Veldscholten	Netherlands	TI–Raleigh–Campagnolo–Merckx	32	+ 51' 30"	
30	Ad Wijnands	Netherlands	TI–Raleigh–Campagnolo–Merckx	53	+ 1h 13' 22"	
31	Peter Winnen	Netherlands	Capri Sonne–Campagnolo–Merckx	4	+ 9' 24"	
32	Gregor Braun	West Germany	Capri Sonne–Campagnolo–Merckx	DNF	—	
33	Ludo Delcroix	Belgium	Capri Sonne–Campagnolo–Merckx	91	+ 1h 58' 36"	
34	Theo de Rooij	Netherlands	Capri Sonne–Campagnolo–Merckx	19	+ 32' 37"	
35	Ronald De Witte	Belgium	Capri Sonne–Campagnolo–Merckx	63	+ 1h 27' 56"	
36	Eric McKenzie	New Zealand	Capri Sonne–Campagnolo–Merckx	87	+ 1h 54' 31"	
37	Rudy Pevenage	Belgium	Capri Sonne–Campagnolo–Merckx	73	+ 1h 35' 23"	
38	Eric Van De Wiele	Belgium	Capri Sonne–Campagnolo–Merckx	68	+ 1h 31' 21"	
39	Dirk Wayenberg	Belgium	Capri Sonne–Campagnolo–Merckx	117	+ 2h 38' 22"	
40	Jostein Wilmann	Norway	Capri Sonne–Campagnolo–Merckx	DNF	—	
41	Jean-René Bernaudeau	France	Peugeot–Shell–Michelin	13	+ 20' 02"	
42	Phil Anderson	Australia	Peugeot–Shell–Michelin	5	+ 12' 16"	
43	Bernard Bourreau	France	Peugeot–Shell–Michelin	DNF	—	
44	Frédéric Brun	France	Peugeot–Shell–Michelin	66	+ 1h 30' 56"	
45	André Chalmel	France	Peugeot–Shell–Michelin	115	+ 2h 33' 49"	
46	Gilbert Duclos-Lassalle	France	Peugeot–Shell–Michelin	60	+ 1h 23' 04"	
47	Michel Laurent	France	Peugeot–Shell–Michelin	48	+ 1h 04' 58"	
48	Hubert Linard	France	Peugeot–Shell–Michelin	56	+ 1h 17' 04"	
49	Patrick Perret	France	Peugeot–Shell–Michelin	38	+ 55' 05"	
50	Pascal Simon	France	Peugeot–Shell–Michelin	20	+ 34' 22"	
51	Claude Criquielion	Belgium	Wickes Bouwmarkt–Splendor	DNF	—	
52	Johnny Broers	Netherlands	Wickes Bouwmarkt–Splendor	DNF	—	
53	Luc Desmet	Belgium	Wickes Bouwmarkt–Splendor	DNF	—	
54	Eddy Planckaert	Belgium	Wickes Bouwmarkt–Splendor	DNF	—	
55	Walter Planckaert	Belgium	Wickes Bouwmarkt–Splendor	DNF	—	
56	Jos Schipper	Netherlands	Wickes Bouwmarkt–Splendor	DNF	—	
57	Eugène Urbany	Luxembourg	Wickes Bouwmarkt–Splendor	97	+ 2h 09' 15"	
58	Benny Van Brabant	Belgium	Wickes Bouwmarkt–Splendor	118	+ 2h 38' 57"	
59	Jean-Philippe Vandenbrande	Belgium	Wickes Bouwmarkt–Splendor	54	+ 1h 14' 56"	
60	Paul Wellens	Belgium	Wickes Bouwmarkt–Splendor	DNF	—	
61	Fons De Wolf	Belgium	Vermeer–Thijs–Gios	31	+ 50' 21"	
62	Roger De Cnijf	Belgium	Vermeer–Thijs–Gios	93	+ 1h 59' 58"	
63	Franky De Gendt	Belgium	Vermeer–Thijs–Gios	DNF	—	
64	Jos Deschoenmaecker	Belgium	Vermeer–Thijs–Gios	DNF	—	
65	Jos Jacobs	Belgium	Vermeer–Thijs–Gios	DNF	—	
66	Louis Luyten	Belgium	Vermeer–Thijs–Gios	92	+ 1h 59' 27"	
67	Danny Schoobaert	Belgium	Vermeer–Thijs–Gios	84	+ 1h 48' 57"	
68	Adri van Houwelingen	Netherlands	Vermeer–Thijs–Gios	40	+ 56' 43"	
69	Jan van Houwelingen	Netherlands	Vermeer–Thijs–Gios	99	+ 2h 11' 19"	
70	Pol Verschuere	Belgium	Vermeer–Thijs–Gios	81	+ 1h 46' 49"	
71	Sean Kelly	Ireland	SEM–France Loire–Campagnolo	15	+ 27' 17"	
72	René Bittinger	France	SEM–France Loire–Campagnolo	44	+ 1h 00' 53"	
73	Jonathan Boyer	United States	SEM–France Loire–Campagnolo	23	+ 44' 09"	
74	André Chappuis	France	SEM–France Loire–Campagnolo	114	+ 2h 28' 19"	
75	Jean-François Chaurin	France	SEM–France Loire–Campagnolo	49	+ 1h 05' 57"	
76	Patrick Clerc	France	SEM–France Loire–Campagnolo	77	+ 1h 43' 05"	
77	Guy Gallopin	France	SEM–France Loire–Campagnolo	DNF	—	
78	Dominique Garde	France	SEM–France Loire–Campagnolo	64	+ 1h 29' 14"	
79	Hubert Graignic	France	SEM–France Loire–Campagnolo	107	+ 2h 17' 01"	
80	Marcel Tinazzi	France	SEM–France Loire–Campagnolo	43	+ 1h 00' 33"	
81	Daniel Willems	Belgium	Sunair–Colnago–Campagnolo	7	+ 15' 33"	
82	Alain De Roo	Belgium	Sunair–Colnago–Campagnolo	123	+ 2h 51' 38"	
83	Werner Devos	Belgium	Sunair–Colnago–Campagnolo	125	+ 3h 04' 44"	
84	Ludo Frijns	Belgium	Sunair–Colnago–Campagnolo	DNF	—	
85	Guy Janiszewski	Belgium	Sunair–Colnago–Campagnolo	101	+ 2h 13' 13"	
86	Frans Van Vlierberghe	Belgium	Sunair–Colnago–Campagnolo	108	+ 2h 18' 07"	
87	Gery Verlinden	Belgium	Sunair–Colnago–Campagnolo	DNF	—	
88	Patrick Versluys	Belgium	Sunair–Colnago–Campagnolo	94	+ 2h 05' 33"	
89	Jan Wijnants	Belgium	Sunair–Colnago–Campagnolo	DNF	—	
90	Ludwig Wijnants	Belgium	Sunair–Colnago–Campagnolo	75	+ 1h 42' 19"	
91	Hennie Kuiper	Netherlands	DAF Trucks–Tévé Blad–Rossin	9	+ 17' 01"	
92	Hendrik Devos	Belgium	DAF Trucks–Tévé Blad–Rossin	88	+ 1h 54' 39"	
93	Marc Dierickx	Belgium	DAF Trucks–Tévé Blad–Rossin	85	+ 1h 51' 17"	
94	Marcel Laurens	Belgium	DAF Trucks–Tévé Blad–Rossin	100	+ 2h 11' 51"	
95	René Martens	Belgium	DAF Trucks–Tévé Blad–Rossin	24	+ 44' 28"	
96	Guy Nulens	Belgium	DAF Trucks–Tévé Blad–Rossin	22	+ 35' 48"	
97	Bert Oosterbosch	Netherlands	DAF Trucks–Tévé Blad–Rossin	DNF	—	
98	William Tackaert	Belgium	DAF Trucks–Tévé Blad–Rossin	DNF	—	
99	Adri van der Poel	Netherlands	DAF Trucks–Tévé Blad–Rossin	102	+ 2h 14' 42"	
100	Peter Zijerveld	Netherlands	DAF Trucks–Tévé Blad–Rossin	DNF	—	
101	Joop Zoetemelk	Netherlands	Coop–Mercier–Mavic	2	+ 6' 21"	
102	Kim Andersen	Denmark	Coop–Mercier–Mavic	17	+ 31' 57"	
103	Yvon Bertin	France	Coop–Mercier–Mavic	124	+ 2h 55' 28"	
104	Régis Clère	France	Coop–Mercier–Mavic	45	+ 1h 00' 55"	
105	Jean-Louis Gauthier	France	Coop–Mercier–Mavic	104	+ 2h 15' 33"	
106	Pierre Le Bigaut	France	Coop–Mercier–Mavic	59	+ 1h 23' 00"	
107	Christian Levavasseur	France	Coop–Mercier–Mavic	DNF	—	
108	Raymond Martin	France	Coop–Mercier–Mavic	8	+ 15' 35"	
109	Pierre-Henri Menthéour	France	Coop–Mercier–Mavic	51	+ 1h 10' 47"	
110	Jacques Michaud	France	Coop–Mercier–Mavic	18	+ 32' 21"	
111	Marino Lejarreta	Spain	Teka	37	+ 54' 29"	
112	Bernardo Alfonsel	Spain	Teka	67	+ 1h 31' 00"	
113	Francisco Albelda	Spain	Teka	DNF	—	
114	Juan-Carlos Alonso	Spain	Teka	122	+ 2h 51' 22"	
115	Antonio Coll	Spain	Teka	70	+ 1h 32' 02"	
116	Alberto Fernández	Spain	Teka	10	+ 17' 19"	
117	Ismael Lejarreta	Spain	Teka	57	+ 1h 20' 21"	
118	José Luis Rodríguez Inguanzo	Spain	Teka	DNF	—	
119	Modesto Urrutibeazcoa	Spain	Teka	DNF	—	
120	Felipe Yáñez	Spain	Teka	110	+ 2h 22' 13"	
121	Sven-Åke Nilsson	Sweden	Wolber–Spidel	14	+ 25' 11"	
122	Dominique Arnaud	France	Wolber–Spidel	36	+ 54' 12"	
123	Jean Chassang	France	Wolber–Spidel	80	+ 1h 44' 21"	
124	Marc Durant	France	Wolber–Spidel	62	+ 1h 27' 23"	
125	Marc Gomez	France	Wolber–Spidel	71	+ 1h 33' 00"	
126	Gérard Kerbrat	France	Wolber–Spidel	DNF	—	
127	Jean-François Rault	France	Wolber–Spidel	74	+ 1h 41' 55"	
128	Christian Seznec	France	Wolber–Spidel	29	+ 49' 28"	
129	Pierre-Raymond Villemiane	France	Wolber–Spidel	55	+ 1h 15' 56"	
130	Claude Vincendeau	France	Wolber–Spidel	89	+ 1h 56' 33"	
131	Stefan Mutter	Switzerland	Puch–Eurotex–Campagnolo	21	+ 35' 02"	
132	Reimund Dietzen	West Germany	Puch–Eurotex–Campagnolo	DNF	—	
133	Mike Gutmann	Switzerland	Puch–Eurotex–Campagnolo	79	+ 1h 43' 58"	
134	Siegfried Hekimi	Switzerland	Puch–Eurotex–Campagnolo	103	+ 2h 15' 00"	
135	Hans Känel	Switzerland	Puch–Eurotex–Campagnolo	DNF	—	
136	Erwin Lienhard	Switzerland	Puch–Eurotex–Campagnolo	95	+ 2h 07' 51"	
137	Harald Maier	Austria	Puch–Eurotex–Campagnolo	78	+ 1h 43' 50"	
138	Hans Neumayer	West Germany	Puch–Eurotex–Campagnolo	DNF	—	
139	Klaus-Peter Thaler	West Germany	Puch–Eurotex–Campagnolo	90	+ 1h 56' 42"	
140	Josef Wehrli	Switzerland	Puch–Eurotex–Campagnolo	69	+ 1h 31' 21"	
141	Giovanni Battaglin	Italy	Inoxpran–Pentole Posate	DNF	—	
142	Giuliano Biatta	Italy	Inoxpran–Pentole Posate	120	+ 2h 45' 10"	
143	Guido Bontempi	Italy	Inoxpran–Pentole Posate	DNF	—	
144	Alfredo Chinetti	Italy	Inoxpran–Pentole Posate	109	+ 2h 19' 26"	
145	Alfonso Dal Pian	Italy	Inoxpran–Pentole Posate	DNF	—	
146	Bruno Leali	Italy	Inoxpran–Pentole Posate	76	+ 1h 42' 50"	
147	Luciano Loro	Italy	Inoxpran–Pentole Posate	58	+ 1h 22' 49"	
148	Luigino Moro	Italy	Inoxpran–Pentole Posate	DNF	—	
149	Amilcare Sgalbazzi	Italy	Inoxpran–Pentole Posate	DNF	—	
150	Carlo Tonon	Italy	Inoxpran–Pentole Posate	116	+ 2h 34' 33"	
151	Beat Breu	Switzerland	Cilo–Aufina	6	+ 13' 21"	
152	Thierry Bolle	Switzerland	Cilo–Aufina	112	+ 2h 26' 41"	
153	Serge Demierre	Switzerland	Cilo–Aufina	72	+ 1h 33' 56"	
154	Antonio Ferretti	Switzerland	Cilo–Aufina	65	+ 1h 30' 07"	
155	Gilbert Glaus	Switzerland	Cilo–Aufina	105	+ 2h 15' 35"	
156	Jean-Marie Grezet	Switzerland	Cilo–Aufina	DNF	—	
157	Patrick Moerlen	Switzerland	Cilo–Aufina	83	+ 1h 48' 07"	
158	Cédric Rossier	Switzerland	Cilo–Aufina	82	+ 1h 47' 08"	
159	Marcel Russenberger	Switzerland	Cilo–Aufina	119	+ 2h 39' 32"	
160	Julius Thalmann	Switzerland	Cilo–Aufina	98	+ 2h 10' 46"	
161	Mario Beccia	Italy	Hoonved–Botecchia	33	+ 52' 35"	
162	Fiorenzo Aliverti	Italy	Hoonved–Botecchia	113	+ 2h 27' 34"	
163	Antonio Bevilacqua	Italy	Hoonved–Botecchia	106	+ 2h 15' 58"	
164	Daniel Gisiger	Switzerland	Hoonved–Botecchia	DNF	—	
165	Silvestro Milani	Italy	Hoonved–Botecchia	DNF	—	
166	Benedetto Patellaro	Italy	Hoonved–Botecchia	DNF	—	
167	Luciano Rui	Italy	Hoonved–Botecchia	DNF	—	
168	Enzo Serpelloni	Italy	Hoonved–Botecchia	121	+ 2h 46' 18"	
169	Dietrich Thurau	West Germany	Hoonved–Botecchia	DNF	—	
170	Rik Van Linden	Belgium	Hoonved–Botecchia	DNF	—	

=== By nationality ===
Country	No. of riders	Finishers	Stage wins
Australia	1	1	1 (Phil Anderson)
Austria	1	1	
Belgium	43	27	5 (Ludo Peeters, Daniel Willems x2, Pol Verschuere, Frank Hoste)
Denmark	1	1	
France	49	44	6 (Bernard Hinault x4, Pierre-Raymond Villemiane, Pascal Simon)
Ireland	1	1	1 (Sean Kelly)
Italy	17	9	
Luxembourg	2	2	
Netherlands	18	13	5 (Gerrie Knetemann x2, Jan Raas, Peter Winnen, Adrie van Houwelingen)
New Zealand	1	1	
Norway	1	0	
Spain	10	7	
Sweden	1	1	
Switzerland	17	14	3 (Stefan Mutter, Beat Breu x2)
United States	1	1	
West Germany	5	1	
Total	170	125	21 (Note: The team time trial on stage 9a, won by TI–Raleigh–Campagnolo, is not counted in this total.)
