= 1985 Scheldeprijs =

Race details
- Dates: 30 July 1985
- Stages: 1
- Distance: 235 km (146.0 mi)
- Winning time: 6h 02' 00"

Results
	Winner	Adri van der Poel (NED)
	Second	Jozef Lieckens; ~~Ludwig Wijnants~~ (BEL)
	Third	~~Marc Sergeant~~ (BEL)

The 1985 Scheldeprijs was the 72nd edition of the Scheldeprijs cycle race and was held on 30 July 1985. The race was won by Adri van der Poel.

== General classification ==
Final general classification

Rank	Rider	Time
1	Adri van der Poel (NED)	6h 02' 00"
~~2~~	~~Ludwig Wijnants (BEL)~~	~~+ 3"~~
~~3~~	~~Marc Sergeant (BEL)~~	~~+ 35"~~
2	Jozef Lieckens (BEL)	+ 55"
5	William Tackaert (BEL)	+ 55"
6	Werner Devos (BEL)	+ 55"
7	Eddy Planckaert (BEL)	+ 55"
8	Leo van Vliet (NED)	+ 55"
9	Francis Vermaelen (BEL)	+ 55"
10	Etienne De Wilde (BEL)	+ 55"
