= 1983 Amstel Gold Race =

Dutch cycling race

The 1983 Amstel Gold Race was the 18th edition of the annual Amstel Gold Race road bicycle race, held on Sunday April 23, 1983, in the Dutch province of Limburg. The race stretched 242 kilometres, with the start in Heerlen and the finish in Meerssen. There were a total of 156 competitors, and 57 cyclists finished the race.

== Result ==
Result	Rider	Team	Time
1st	Phil Anderson (AUS)	Peugeot Shell Michelin	5 hr 50 min 26 sec
2nd	Jan Bogaert (BEL)	Europ Decor - Dries	+ 31 sec
3rd	Jan Raas (NED)	TI Raleigh Campagnolo	finished same time
4th	Jacques Hanegraaf (NED)	TI Raleigh Campagnolo	finished same time
5th	Etienne De Wilde (BEL)	La Redoute	finished same time
6th	Gilbert Duclos-Lassalle (FRA)	Peugeot Shell Michelin	finished same time
7th	Luc Colijn (BEL)	Fangio Tönissteiner	finished same time
8th	Patrick Cocquyt (BEL)	Safir - Van de Ven	finished same time
9th	Ad Wijnands (NED)	TI Raleigh Campagnolo	finished same time
10th	Steven Rooks (NED)	Sem - France-Loire	finished same time
11th	Adri van der Poel (NED)	Aernoudt Rossin	finished same time
12th	Joop Zoetemelk (NED)	Coop Mercier Mavic	finished same time
13th	Eddy Planckaert (BEL)	Splendor - Euro Shop	finished same time
14th	Marc Sergeant (BEL)	Europ Decor - Dries	finished same time
15th	Johan Van der Velde (NED)	TI Raleigh Campagnolo	finished same time
16th	Henk Lubberding (NED)	TI Raleigh Campagnolo	finished same time
17th	Jonathan Boyer (USA)	Sem - France-Loire	finished same time
18th	Stefan Mutter (SUI)	Eorotex - Magniflex	finished same time
19th	Régis Clere (FRA)	Coop Mercier Mavic	finished same time
20th	Stephen Roche (IRE)	Peugeot Shell Michelin	finished same time
21st	Bernard Vallet (FRA)	La Redoute	finished same time
22nd	Leo van Vliet (NED)	TI Raleigh Campagnolo	finished same time
23rd	Michel Laurent (FRA)	Coop Mercier Mavic	finished same time
24th	Rudy Dhaenens (BEL)	Splendor - Euro Shop	+ 38 sec
25th	Jos Schipper (NED)	Elro Snacks - Auto Brabant	finished same time
26th	Francis De Ridder (NED)	Fangio Tönissteiner	+ 2 min 14 sec
27th	Jostein Wilmann (NOR)	Eorotex - Magniflex	+ 2 min 48 sec
28th	Heddy Nieuwdorp (NED)	Beckers Snacks	+ 3 min 17 sec
29th	Hans Langerijs (NED)	Beckers Snacks	finished same time
30th	Jean Chassang (FRA)	Wolber - Spidel	finished same time
31st	Herman Crabbe (BEL)	Perlav - Euro Soap	+ 7 min 29 sec
32nd	Benny Schepmans (BEL)	Elro Snacks - Auto Brabant	finished same time
33rd	Gregor Braun (FRG)	Vivi - Benotto	finished same time
34th	Uwe Bolten (FRG)	Vivi - Benotto	finished same time
35th	Gabriele Landoni (ITA)	Vivi - Benotto	finished same time
36th	Harald Maier (AUT)	Eorotex - Magniflex	finished same time
37th	Gerhard Zadrobilek (AUT)	Eorotex - Magniflex	finished same time
38th	Claude Criquielion (BEL)	Splendor - Euro Shop	finished same time
39th	Paul Haghedooren (BEL)	Splendor - Euro Shop	finished same time
40th	Freddy Maertens (BEL)	Masta TeVe Blad Concorde	finished same time
41st	Eddy Schepers (BEL)	Perlav - Euro Soap	finished same time
42nd	Marc Vercammen (BEL)	Perlav - Euro Soap	finished same time
43rd	Hubert Linard (FRA)	Peugeot Shell Michelin	finished same time
44th	Robert Millar (GBR)	Peugeot Shell Michelin	finished same time
45th	Pascal Simon (FRA)	Peugeot Shell Michelin	finished same time
46th	Johan de Muynck (BEL)	La Redoute	finished same time
47th	Ronny Van Holen (BEL)	Safir - Van de Ven	finished same time
48th	Jef Lieckens (BEL)	Safir - Van de Ven	finished same time
49th	Cédric Rossier (SUI)	Sem - France-Loire	finished same time
50th	Joaquim Agostinho (POR)	Sem - France-Loire	finished same time
51st	Marc Gomez (FRA)	Wolber - Spidel	finished same time
52nd	Jean-François Rodriguez (FRA)	Wolber - Spidel	finished same time
53rd	Christian Seznec (FRA)	Wolber - Spidel	finished same time
54th	Philippe Leleu (FRA)	Wolber - Spidel	finished same time
55th	Allan Peiper (AUS)	Peugeot Shell Michelin	+ 9 min 56 sec
56th	Jacques Michaud (FRA)	Coop Mercier Mavic	finished same time
57th	Luc Govaerts (BEL)	Europ Decor - Dries	finished same time
