= Kerbrat =

Kerbrat is a toponymic surname deriving from the Breton kêr meaning "village" or "hamlet" and Latin prātum meaning "meadow".

== People with the surname ==
- Andy Kerbrat (born 1990), French politician
- Christophe Kerbrat (born 1986), French professional footballer
- Gérard Kerbrat (born 1956), French former professional racing cyclist
- Renaud Kerbrat, French gun designer and inventor
- Gabriel Calloet-Kerbrat 17th Century Breton French agriculturalist

== See also ==
- Kebraty, a settlement with a similar but unrelated name in Perm Krai, Russia.
