= 1994 Dwars door België =

Race details
- Dates: 23 March 1994
- Stages: 1
- Distance: 207 km (128.6 mi)
- Winning time: 5h 23' 00"

Results
	Winner	Carlo Bomans (BEL)
	Second	Marc Sergeant (BEL)
	Third	Ludwig Willems (BEL)

The 1994 Dwars door België was the 49th edition of the Dwars door Vlaanderen cycle race and was held on 23 March 1994. The race started and finished in Waregem. The race was won by Carlo Bomans.

== General classification ==
Final general classification

Rank	Rider	Time
1	Carlo Bomans (BEL)	5h 23' 00"
2	Marc Sergeant (BEL)	+ 20"
3	Ludwig Willems (BEL)	+ 28"
4	Rik Van Slycke (BEL)	+ 2' 04"
5	Olaf Ludwig (GER)	+ 2' 21"
6	Peter De Clercq (BEL)	+ 2' 21"
7	Tristan Hoffman (NED)	+ 2' 21"
8	Maarten den Bakker (NED)	+ 2' 21"
9	Rob Mulders (NED)	+ 2' 21"
10	Chris Peers (BEL)	+ 9' 01"
