= Frijns =

Frijns is a surname. Notable people with the surname include:

- Ludo Frijns (born 1957), Belgian professional racing cyclist
- Robin Frijns (born 1991), Dutch auto racing driver
