= 1987 E3 Prijs Vlaanderen =

1987 E3 Harelbeke
Race details
- Dates: 26 March 1987
- Stages: 1
- Distance: 225 km (140 mi)
- Winning time: 5h 04' 00"

Results
	Winner	Eddy Planckaert (BEL)	(Panasonic–Isostar)
	Second	Jelle Nijdam (NED)	(Superconfex–Kwantum–Yoko–Colnago)
	Third	Marc Sergeant (BEL)	(Lotto–Merckx)

The 1987 E3 Harelbeke was the 30th edition of the E3 Harelbeke cycle race and was held on 26 March 1987. The race started and finished in Harelbeke. The race was won by Eddy Planckaert of the Panasonic team.

== General classification ==
Final general classification

Rank	Rider	Team	Time
1	Eddy Planckaert (BEL)	Panasonic–Isostar	5h 04' 00"
2	Jelle Nijdam (NED)	Superconfex–Kwantum–Yoko–Colnago	+ 12"
3	Marc Sergeant (BEL)	Lotto–Merckx	+ 12"
4	Hendrik Redant (BEL)	Robland–Isoglass	+ 2' 30"
5	Eric Vanderaerden (BEL)	Panasonic–Isostar	+ 2' 30"
6	Jos Lammertink (NED)	Transvemij–Van Schilt	+ 2' 30"
7	Phil Anderson (AUS)	Panasonic–Isostar	+ 2' 30"
8	Nico Verhoeven (NED)	Superconfex–Kwantum–Yoko–Colnago	+ 2' 30"
9	Martial Gayant (FRA)	Système U	+ 2' 30"
10	Franky Van Oyen (BEL)	Sigma–Fina	+ 2' 30"
