= Luc Colijn =

Belgian cyclist (born 1958)

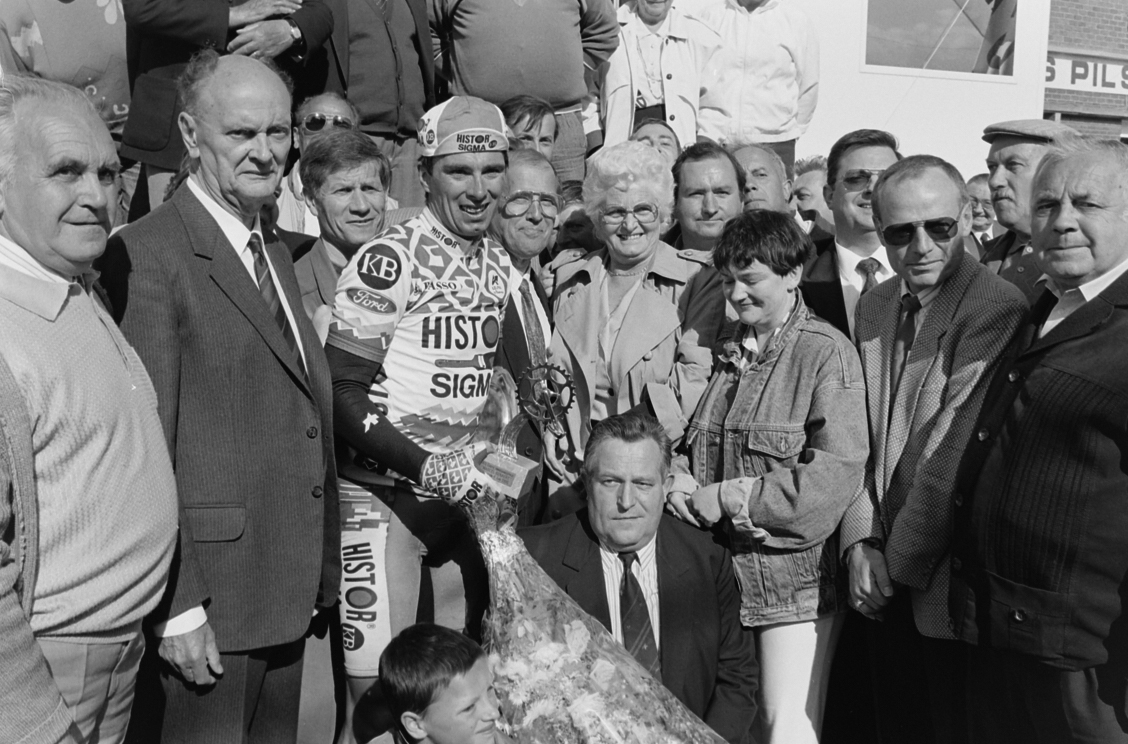
- Colijn after winning Gullegem Koerse in 1991

Personal information
- Full name: Luc Colijn
- Born: 2 May 1958 (age 68) Ghent, Belgium

Cycling career
- Sport: Cycling
- Current team: Team Flanders–Baloise
- Discipline: Road
- Role: Rider (Retired); Directeur sportif

Professional teams
- 1980–1982: DAF Trucks–Lejeune
- 1983: Fangio–Tönissteiner–OM Trucks–Mavic
- 1984–1985: Safir–Van de Ven
- 1986: Fangio–Lois–Mavic
- 1987–1988: AD Renting–Fangio–IOC–MBK
- 1989: Humo–TW
- 1990–1991: Histor–Sigma
- 1992: La William–Duvel
- 1993: Trident–Schick–Gilals–Wimi

Managerial teams
- 2003–2004: Lotto–Domo
- 2012–: Topsport Vlaanderen–Mercator

Luc Colijn (born 2 May 1958) is a Belgian former professional racing cyclist. He rode in the 1981 Tour de France. He currently works as a directeur sportif for Team Flanders–Baloise. He is the grandson of cyclist Achiel Buysse.

== Major results ==
=== Road ===
1978
1st Road race, National Military Road Championships
2nd Military Road World Championships
3rd Brussel–Opwijk
1979
1st Ronde van Vlaanderen Beloften
5th Kattekoers
1980
1st Stage 1 Tour de Wallonie
1st Coupe Egide Schoeters
2nd Kampioenschap van Vlaanderen
3rd Grand Prix de Waregem
1981
1st Petegem-aan-de-Leie
2nd Leeuwse Pijl
3rd Paris–Tours
3rd Nationale Sluitingprijs
8th De Brabantse Pijl
8th Grote Prijs Jef Scherens
1982
1st Nationale Sluitingprijs
1st Berlare
1st De Pinte
1st GP Lanssens
2nd Omloop van het Zuidwesten
3rd Flèche Hesbignonne
8th Kuurne–Brussels–Kuurne
1983
1st Omloop van de Grensstreek
1st Prix de Mellet
2nd Le Samyn
2nd Grand Prix de Peymeinade
3rd Omloop Het Volk
3rd Rund um den Henninger Turm
4th Tour of Flanders
6th Grand Prix de Wallonie
7th Amstel Gold Race
9th De Brabantse Pijl
9th E3 Prijs Vlaanderen
10th Paris–Tours
1984
1st GP Stad Zottegem
1st Ronde van Midden-Zeeland
6th Omloop Het Volk
8th Tour of Flanders
8th E3 Prijs Vlaanderen
10th De Kustpijl
1985
4th Dwars door België
6th Omloop Het Volk
1986
1st Nokere Koerse
1987
1st Zomergem-Adinkerke
5th Grand Prix Cerami
8th De Kustpijl
1989
1st Dwars door West-Vlaanderen
1990
6th Nokere Koerse
1991
1st Gullegem Koerse
6th Overall Tour d'Armorique
1992
5th Tour de Vendée

=== Track ===
1978
Belgian National Championships

1st Amateur Pursuit (with François Caethoven, Hendrik Caethoven and Patrick Lerno)

1979
Belgian National Championships

1st Amateur Points
1st Amateur Derny

1989
European Track Championships
1st Derny
1991
European Track Championships
3rd Derny

=== Grand Tour general classification results timeline ===
Grand Tour	1981	1982	1983	1984
Vuelta a España	—	—	—	DNF
Giro d'Italia	—	—	—	—
Tour de France	DNF	—	—	—

Legend
—	Did not compete
DNF	Did Not Finish
