= 1989 E3 Prijs Vlaanderen =

1989 E3 Harelbeke
Race details
- Dates: 25 March 1989
- Stages: 1
- Distance: 211 km (131 mi)
- Winning time: 5h 12' 00"

Results
	Winner	Eddy Planckaert (BEL)	(AD Renting–W-Cup–Bottecchia)
	Second	Adri van der Poel (NED)	(Domex–Weinmann)
	Third	Marc Sergeant (BEL)	(Hitachi)

The 1989 E3 Harelbeke was the 32nd edition of the E3 Harelbeke cycle race and was held on 25 March 1989. The race started and finished in Harelbeke. The race was won by Eddy Planckaert of the AD Renting team.

== General classification ==
Final general classification

Rank	Rider	Team	Time
1	Eddy Planckaert (BEL)	AD Renting–W-Cup–Bottecchia	5h 12' 00"
2	Adri van der Poel (NED)	Domex–Weinmann	+ 0"
3	Marc Sergeant (BEL)	Hitachi	+ 0"
4	Eddy Schurer (NED)	TVM–Ragno	+ 0"
5	Claude Criquielion (BEL)	Hitachi	+ 15"
6	Phil Anderson (AUS)	TVM–Ragno	+ 1' 10"
7	Jean-Marie Wampers (BEL)	Panasonic–Isostar–Colnago–Agu	+ 1' 10"
8	Roberto Gaggioli (ITA)	Eurocar–Mosoca–Galli	+ 1' 10"
9	Mathieu Hermans (NED)	Caja Rural	+ 1' 10"
10	Jan Goessens (BEL)	Domex–Weinmann	+ 1' 10"
