= 1985 E3 Prijs Vlaanderen =

1985 E3 Harelbeke
Race details
- Dates: 30 March 1985
- Stages: 1
- Distance: 215 km (134 mi)
- Winning time: 5h 33' 12"

Results
	Winner	Phil Anderson (AUS)	(Panasonic–Raleigh)
	Second	Jozef Lieckens (BEL)	(Lotto)
	Third	Eddy Planckaert (BEL)	(Panasonic–Raleigh)

The 1985 E3 Harelbeke was the 28th edition of the Belgian E3 Harelbeke cycle race, held on 30 March 1985. The race started and finished in the city of Harelbeke, West Flanders. The race was won by Phil Anderson of the Panasonic team.

== General classification ==
Final general classification

Rank	Rider	Team	Time
1	Phil Anderson (AUS)	Panasonic–Raleigh	5h 33' 12"
2	Jozef Lieckens (BEL)	Lotto	+ 15"
3	Eddy Planckaert (BEL)	Panasonic–Raleigh	+ 15"
4	Etienne De Wilde (BEL)	Safir–Van de Ven	+ 15"
5	William Tackaert (BEL)	Fangio–Ecoturbo–Eylenbosch	+ 15"
6	Eric Vanderaerden (BEL)	Panasonic–Raleigh	+ 35"
7	Yvan Lamote (BEL)	Hitachi–Splendor–Sunair	+ 35"
8	Patrick Versluys (BEL)	Hitachi–Splendor–Sunair	+ 35"
9	Marc Sergeant (BEL)	Lotto	+ 35"
10	Sean Kelly (IRL)	Skil–Sem–Kas–Miko	+ 35"
