= 1980 Scheldeprijs =

Race details
- Dates: 29 July 1980
- Stages: 1
- Distance: 250 km (155.3 mi)
- Winning time: 5h 56' 00"

Results
	Winner	Ludo Peeters (BEL)
	Second	René Martens (BEL)
	Third	Jan Raas (NED)

The 1980 Scheldeprijs was the 67th edition of the Scheldeprijs cycle race and was held on 29 July 1980. The race was won by Ludo Peeters.

== General classification ==
Final general classification

Rank	Rider	Time
1	Ludo Peeters (BEL)	5h 56' 00"
2	René Martens (BEL)	+ 3"
3	Jan Raas (NED)	+ 1' 15"
4	Theo de Rooij (NED)	+ 1' 15"
5	Eddy Schepers (BEL)	+ 1' 15"
6	Roger De Vlaeminck (BEL)	+ 1' 30"
7	Jos Jacobs (BEL)	+ 1' 30"
8	William Tackaert (BEL)	+ 1' 30"
9	Gery Verlinden (BEL)	+ 1' 30"
10	Ferdi Van Den Haute (BEL)	+ 1' 45"
