= 1986 Giro di Lombardia =

Race details
- Dates: 18 October 1986
- Stages: 1
- Distance: 262 km (162.8 mi)
- Winning time: 7h 07' 07"

Results
	Winner	Gianbattista Baronchelli (ITA)	(Del Tongo)
	Second	Sean Kelly (IRL)	(Kas)
	Third	Phil Anderson (AUS)	(Panasonic–Merckx–Agu)

The 1986 Giro di Lombardia was the 80th edition of the Giro di Lombardia cycle race and was held on 18 October 1986. The race started in Como and finished in Milan. The race was won by Gianbattista Baronchelli of the Del Tongo team.

== General classification ==
Final general classification

Rank	Rider	Team	Time
1	Gianbattista Baronchelli (ITA)	Del Tongo	7h 07' 07"
2	Sean Kelly (IRL)	Kas	+ 15"
3	Phil Anderson (AUS)	Panasonic–Merckx–Agu	+ 15"
4	Leo Schönenberger (SUI)	Dromedario–Laminox	+ 15"
5	Acácio da Silva (POR)	Malvor–Bottecchia–Vaporella	+ 15"
6	Flavio Giupponi (ITA)	Del Tongo	+ 15"
7	Jörg Müller (SUI)	Kas	+ 7' 03"
8	Alfred Achermann (SUI)	Kas	+ 7' 34"
9	Luciano Rabottini (ITA)	Vini Ricordi–Pinarello–Sidermec	+ 7' 34"
10	Niki Rüttimann (SUI)	La Vie Claire	+ 7' 34"
