= 1981 Grote Prijs Jef Scherens =

Race details
- Dates: 20 September 1981
- Stages: 1
- Distance: 214 km (133.0 mi)
- Winning time: 5h 10' 00"

Results
	Winner	Jan Raas (NED)
	Second	Rudy Pevenage (BEL)
	Third	Sean Kelly (IRL)

The 1981 Grote Prijs Jef Scherens was the 17th edition of the Grote Prijs Jef Scherens cycle race and was held on 20 September 1981. The race started and finished in Leuven. The race was won by Jan Raas.

Rudy Pevenage from the Capri-Sonne team secured second place, while Irish cycler Sean Kelly, riding for Splendor-Wickes Bouwmarkt, finished third. The race is named after Jef Scherens, a seven-time world sprint champion,

== General classification ==
Final general classification

Rank	Rider	Time
1	Jan Raas (NED)	5h 10' 00"
2	Rudy Pevenage (BEL)	+ 0"
3	Sean Kelly (IRL)	+ 0"
4	Patrick Versluys (BEL)	+ 0"
5	Ludo Delcroix (BEL)	+ 0"
6	Etienne Van Der Helst (BEL)	+ 0"
7	Eddy Verstraeten (BEL)	+ 0"
8	Luc Colijn (BEL)	+ 0"
9	Johan Louwet (BEL)	+ 0"
10	Eric Van De Wiele (BEL)	+ 0"
