= 1986 Grand Prix d'Automne =

Race details
- Dates: 12 October 1986
- Stages: 1
- Distance: 253 km (157.2 mi)
- Winning time: 6h 13' 07"

Results
	Winner	Phil Anderson (AUS)
	Second	Jean-Louis Peillon (FRA)
	Third	Charly Mottet (FRA)

The 1986 Grand Prix d'Automne was the 80th edition of the Paris–Tours cycle race and was held on 12 October 1986. The race started in Créteil and finished in Chaville. The race was won by Phil Anderson.

== General classification ==
Final general classification

Rank	Rider	Time
1	Phil Anderson (AUS)	6h 13' 07"
2	Jean-Louis Peillon (FRA)	+ 0"
3	Charly Mottet (FRA)	+ 0"
4	Adri van der Poel (NED)	+ 54"
5	Jörg Muller (SUI)	+ 57"
6	Sean Kelly (IRL)	+ 1' 03"
7	Jozef Lieckens (BEL)	+ 1' 03"
8	Acácio da Silva (POR)	+ 1' 03"
9	Frank Hoste (BEL)	+ 1' 03"
10	Dag Erik Pedersen (NOR)	+ 1' 03"
