= 1985 Tour of Flanders =

Race details
- Dates: 7 April 1985
- Stages: 1
- Distance: 271 km (168.4 mi)
- Winning time: 6h 49' 50"

Results
	Winner	Eric Vanderaerden (BEL)	(Panasonic)
	Second	Phil Anderson (AUS)	(Panasonic)
	Third	Hennie Kuiper (NED)	(Verandalux)

The 69th running of the Tour of Flanders cycling race took place on 7 April 1985. It was won by Belgian Eric Vanderaerden in an average speed of 39,605 km/h. The race was affected by abysmal weather, when a storm accompanied by wind and torrential rainfall, broke in the afternoon. Only 24 of 173 participants arrived.

== Race summary ==
Eric Vanderaerden, a promising young Belgian, suffered a broken wheel at a critical point in the race, but managed to return to the back of the peloton by the foot of the Koppenberg, 70 km from the finish. On the slippery cobbles of the infamous climb, Vanderaerden is one of the only riders to stay on his bike as the peloton shattered. Slaloming around others who had to shoulder their bikes up the hill, he was back in fifteenth place at the top, before setting out in an improbable pursuit of the leaders.

As a storm caused further havoc, the lead group became 6 riders, with Sean Kelly, Greg LeMond, Adrie van der Poel and Phil Anderson. Vanderaerden and Hennie Kuiper led the chase and finally rejoined the lead by the Eikenberg. Kuiper attacked on the Berendries, 28 km from the finish. Vanderaerden and his teammate Phil Anderson combined and bridged the gap with Kuiper at the base of the Muur van Geraardsbergen.

As the weather further deteriorated, Vanderaerden broke clear from his worn-out companions on the Muur. The Belgian, considered a sprinter, rounded off a 20 km solo to claim his first major classics victory. Teammate Phil Anderson attacked Kuiper with 4 km to go, taking second place, before Kuiper. At 23, Vanderaerden became the youngest Post-World War II winner of the Tour of Flanders.

== Weather conditions ==
The race gained a place in cycling legend because a severe storm broke out in the second half of the race, with cold, strong winds and torrential rainfall decimating the peloton. The high volume of water made roads extremely slick and concealed potholes, with the potential to take riders or their tyres out. After 200 km of racing only 40–50 riders remained. Historian Rik Vanwalleghem said:

"It was a legendary Ronde, one which wrote Sport with a capital S. It was cold as Siberia all day and the rain fell in torrents. [...] In this apocalyptic background Eric Vanderaerden got back to the front after looking beaten, and powered on alone for 20km at the front of the race. Impressive."

Vanderaerden was one of only 24 finishers, the lowest number in modern times.

== Route ==
The race started in Sint-Niklaas and finished in Meerbeke (Ninove) – totaling 271 km. The course featured 12 categorized climbs:

- Molenberg
- Oude Kwaremont
- Koppenberg
- Taaienberg
- Berg ten Houte
- Eikenberg
- Varent
- Keiweg-Leberg
- Berendries
- Muur-Kapelmuur
- Bosberg
- Flierendries

== Results ==
	Cyclist	Team	Time
1	Eric Vanderaerden (BEL)	Panasonic	6h 49' 50"
2	Phil Anderson (AUS)	Panasonic	+41"
3	Hennie Kuiper (NED)	Verandalux	+1'01"
4	Noël Segers (BEL)	Tönissteiner	+2'03"
5	Jos Lieckens (BEL)	Lotto	s.t.
6	Claude Criquielion (BEL)	Hitachi	s.t.
7	Greg LeMond (USA)	La Vie Claire	s.t.
8	Walter Planckaert (BEL)	Panasonic	+3'46"
9	Jean-Marie Wampers (BEL)	Hitachi	+3'48"
10	Stefan Mutter (SUI)	Carrera-Inoxpran	s.t.
