= 1985 Gent–Wevelgem =

Race details
- Dates: 10 April 1985
- Stages: 1
- Distance: 262 km (163 mi)
- Winning time: 6h 20' 00"

Results
	Winner	Eric Vanderaerden (BEL)	(Panasonic–Raleigh)
	Second	Phil Anderson (AUS)	(Panasonic–Raleigh)
	Third	Rudy Dhaenens (BEL)	(Hitachi–Splendor–Sunair)

The 1985 Gent–Wevelgem was the 47th edition of the Belgian Gent–Wevelgem cycle race and was held on 10 April 1985. The race started in Ghent and finished in Wevelgem. The race was won by Eric Vanderaerden of the Panasonic team.

== General classification ==
Final general classification

Rank	Rider	Team	Time
1	Eric Vanderaerden (BEL)	Panasonic–Raleigh	6h 20' 00"
2	Phil Anderson (AUS)	Panasonic–Raleigh	+ 0"
3	Rudy Dhaenens (BEL)	Hitachi–Splendor–Sunair	+ 0"
4	Francis Castaing (FRA)	Peugeot–Shell–Michelin	+ 0"
5	William Tackaert (BEL)	Fangio–Ecoturbo	+ 0"
6	Jozef Lieckens (BEL)	Lotto	+ 0"
7	Sean Kelly (IRL)	Skil–Sem–Kas–Miko	+ 0"
8	Jacques Hanegraaf (NED)	Kwantum–Decosol–Yoko	+ 0"
9	Fons van Katwijk (NED)	Skala–Gazelle	+ 0"
10	Jean-Philippe Vandenbrande (BEL)	Hitachi–Splendor–Sunair	+ 0"
