= 1984 La Flèche Wallonne =

Race details
- Dates: 12 April 1984
- Stages: 1
- Distance: 246 km (152.9 mi)
- Winning time: 6h 12' 50"

Results
	Winner	Kim Andersen (DEN)	(COOP–Hoonved)
	Second	William Tackaert (BEL)	(Fangio–Tonissteiner–OM Trucks–Mavic)
	Third	Heddie Nieuwdorp (NED)	(AVP–Viditel–Concorde)

The 1984 La Flèche Wallonne was the 48th edition of La Flèche Wallonne cycle race and was held on 12 April 1984. The race started in Charleroi and finished in Huy. The race was won by Kim Andersen of the COOP–Hoonved team.

== General classification ==
Final general classification

Rank	Rider	Team	Time
1	Kim Andersen (DEN)	COOP–Hoonved	6h 12' 50"
2	William Tackaert (BEL)	Fangio–Tonissteiner–OM Trucks–Mavic	+ 3' 39"
3	Heddie Nieuwdorp (NED)	AVP–Viditel–Concorde	+ 3' 39"
4	Dominique Arnaud (FRA)	La Vie Claire	+ 3' 39"
5	Henri Manders (NED)	Kwantum–Decosol–Yoko	+ 3' 39"
6	Henk Lubberding (NED)	Panasonic–Raleigh	+ 4' 26"
7	Urs Zimmermann (SUI)	Cilo–Aufina–Crans–Montana	+ 4' 26"
8	Hubert Linard (FRA)	Peugeot–Shell–Michelin	+ 4' 28"
9	Phil Anderson (AUS)	Panasonic–Raleigh	+ 5' 49"
10	Acácio da Silva (POR)	Malvor–Bottecchia	+ 5' 49"
