= 1988 Tour of Flanders =

72nd Tour of Flanders
Race details
- Dates: 3 April 1988
- Stages: 1
- Distance: 279 km (173.4 mi)
- Winning time: 7h 27' 28"

Results
	Winner	Eddy Planckaert (BEL)	(ADR)
	Second	Phil Anderson (AUS)	(TVM)
	Third	Adrie van der Poel (NED)	(PDM)

The 72nd running of the Tour of Flanders cycling classic was held on 3 April 1988. It was won by Eddy Planckaert in a two-man sprint with Australian Phil Anderson. 88 of 197 starters finished the race.

== Race report ==
On the Berendries, 30 km from the finish, Marc Sergeant, Rudy Dhaenens and Phil Anderson broke clear, but Sean Kelly made his team work in pursuit. At the top of the Muur van Geraardsbergen, three riders, Adrie van der Poel, Eddy Planckaert and Phil Anderson, were ahead of the peloton. Van der Poel was dropped on the Bosberg and Anderson made several frantic efforts to distance the fast Planckaert on the final run-in towards Meerbeke. Planckaert, relying on his strong sprint finish, easily beat Anderson at the line. Van der Poel won the sprint for third place, 18 seconds behind Planckaert. Eddy Planckaert won his first monument classic, 12 years after his brother Walter Planckaert won the Tour of Flanders.

== Route ==
The race started in Sint-Niklaas and finished in Meerbeke (Ninove) – totaling 279 km. The course featured 12 categorized climbs:

- Molenberg
- Oude Kwaremont
- Paterberg
- Kortekeer
- Taaienberg
- Berg ten Houte
- Eikenberg
- Varent
- Keiweg-Leberg
- Berendries
- Muur-Kapelmuur
- Bosberg

== Results ==
Result
Rank	Rider	Team	Time
1	Eddy Planckaert (BEL)	ADR	7h 27' 28"
2	Phil Anderson (AUS)	TVM	s.t.
3	Adrie van der Poel (NED)	PDM	+ 18"
4	Sean Kelly (IRL)	KAS	s.t.
5	Steven Rooks (NED)	PDM	s.t.
6	Marc Sergeant (BEL)	Hitachi	s.t.
7	Charly Mottet (FRA)	Système U–Gitane	s.t.
8	Rudy Dhaenens (BEL)	PDM	s.t.
9	Gert-Jan Theunisse (NED)	PDM	s.t.
10	Giuseppe Calcaterra (ITA)	Atala	+ 3' 19"
