= 1986 Dwars door België =

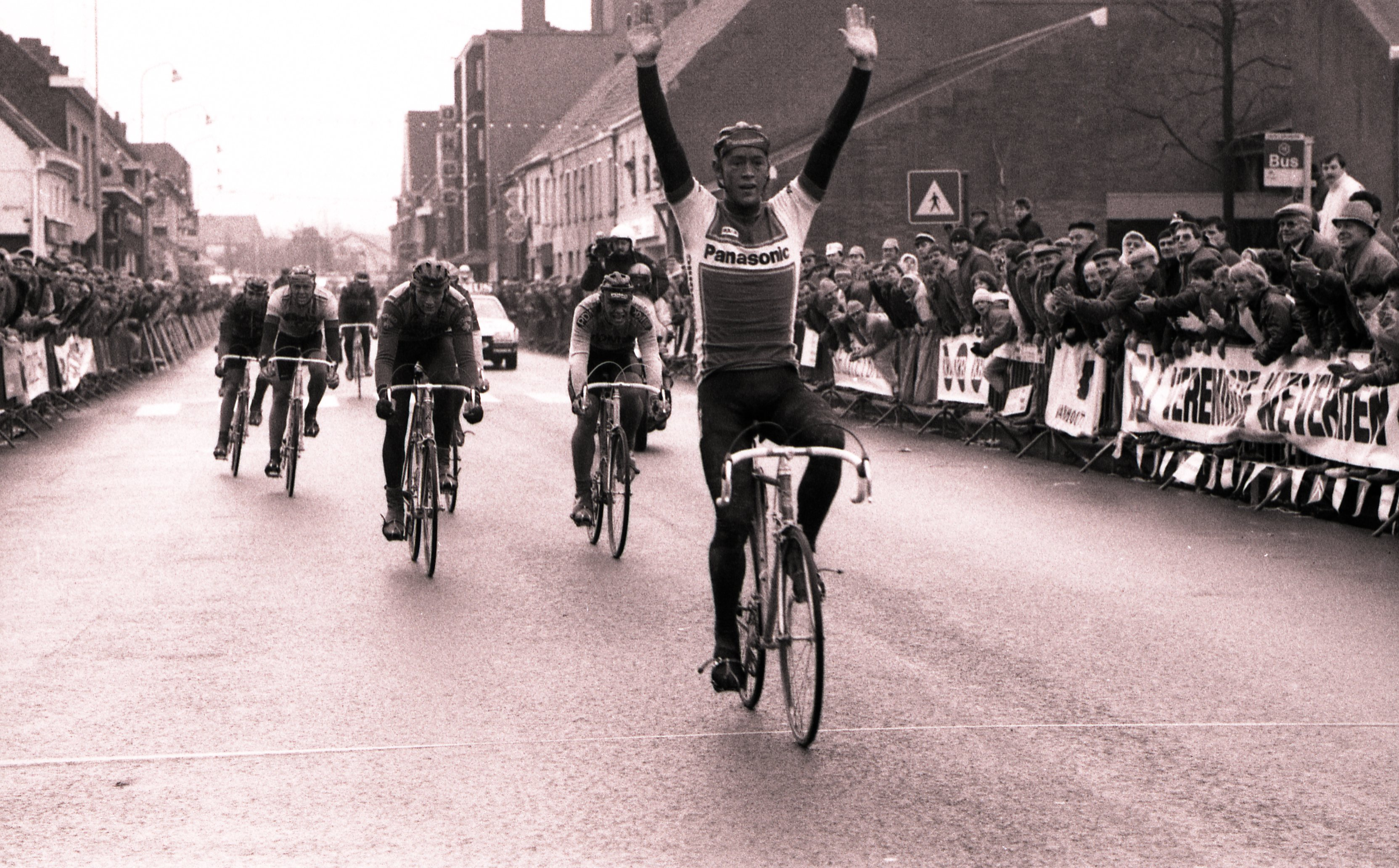
- Overwinning Eric Vanderaerden, Dwars door België 1986, Waregem, Maurice Terryn (collectie KOERS. Museum van de Wielersport)

Race details
- Dates: 23 March 1986
- Stages: 1
- Distance: 204 km (126.8 mi)
- Winning time: 5h 13' 00"

Results
	Winner	Eric Vanderaerden (BEL)
	Second	Adri van der Poel (NED)
	Third	Peter Stevenhaagen (NED)

The 1986 Dwars door België was the 41st edition of the Dwars door Vlaanderen cycle race and was held on 23 March 1986. The race started and finished in Waregem. The race was won by Eric Vanderaerden.

== General classification ==
Final general classification

Rank	Rider	Time
1	Eric Vanderaerden (BEL)	5h 13' 00"
2	Adri van der Poel (NED)	+ 0"
3	Peter Stevenhaagen (NED)	+ 0"
4	Noël Segers (BEL)	+ 0"
5	Frits Pirard (NED)	+ 0"
6	Marc Sergeant (BEL)	+ 0"
7	Willem Wijnant (BEL)	+ 0"
8	Jos Lammertink (NED)	+ 0"
9	Jan Jonkers (NED)	+ 10"
10	Martin Kemp (NED)	+ 10"
