= 1984 Omloop Het Volk =

Race details
- Dates: 3 March 1984
- Stages: 1
- Distance: 226 km (140 mi)
- Winning time: 5h 24' 02"

Results
	Winner	Eddy Planckaert (BEL)
	Second	Jean-Luc Vandenbroucke (BEL)
	Third	Ludo Peeters (BEL)

The 1984 Omloop Het Volk was the 39th edition of the Omloop Het Volk cycle race and was held on 3 March 1984. The race started and finished in Ghent. The race was won by Eddy Planckaert.

== General classification ==
Final general classification
Rank	Rider	Time
1	Eddy Planckaert (BEL)	5h 24' 02"
2	Jean-Luc Vandenbroucke (BEL)	+ 0"
3	Ludo Peeters (BEL)	+ 0"
4	Walter Planckaert (BEL)	+ 0"
5	Jos Lammertink (NED)	+ 5' 35"
6	Luc Colijn (BEL)	+ 5' 35"
7	Johan Lammerts (NED)	+ 5' 55"
8	Bert Oosterbosch (NED)	+ 5' 55"
9	Eric Vanderaerden (BEL)	+ 5' 55"
10	Ferdi Van Den Haute (BEL)	+ 5' 55"
