= 1991 Dwars door België =

Race details
- Dates: 28 March 1991
- Stages: 1
- Distance: 203 km (126.1 mi)
- Winning time: 5h 06' 00"

Results
	Winner	Eric Vanderaerden (BEL)
	Second	Uwe Raab (GER)
	Third	Remig Stumpf (GER)

The 1991 Dwars door België was the 46th edition of the Dwars door Vlaanderen cycle race and was held on 28 March 1991. The race started and finished in Waregem. The race was won by Eric Vanderaerden.

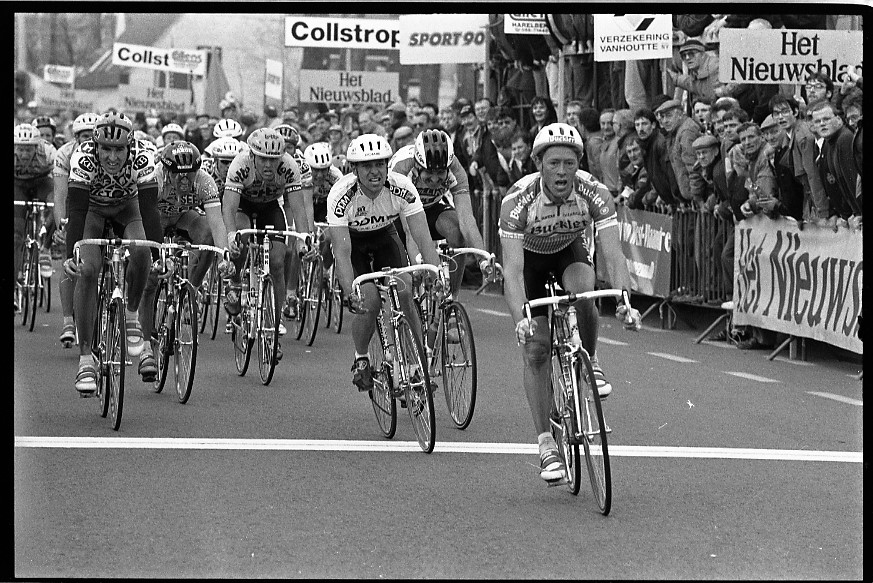
Eric Vanderaerden arrives first in Waregem (collection KOERS. Museum of Cycle Racing)

== General classification ==
Final general classification

Rank	Rider	Time
1	Eric Vanderaerden (BEL)	5h 06' 00"
2	Uwe Raab (GER)	+ 0"
3	Remig Stumpf (GER)	+ 0"
4	Danny Neskens (BEL)	+ 0"
5	Benny Van Brabant (BEL)	+ 0"
6	Hendrik Redant (BEL)	+ 0"
7	Adri van der Poel (NED)	+ 0"
8	Wilfried Peeters (BEL)	+ 0"
9	Jerry Cooman (BEL)	+ 0"
10	Christophe Capelle (FRA)	+ 0"
