= Jozef Lieckens =

Belgian cyclist

Personal information
- Born: 26 March 1959 (age 67) Nijlen, Belgium

Cycling career
- Sport: Cycling
- Discipline: Road
- Role: Rider

Professional teams
- 1981–1982: Capri Sonne–Koga Miyata
- 1983–1984: Safir–Van de Ven
- 1983–1984: Safir–Van de Ven
- 1985–1987: Lotto
- 1988–1989: Hitachi–Bosal–B.C.E. Snooker
- 1990–1991: Panasonic–Sportlife

Jozef Lieckens (born 26 March 1959) is a Belgian former professional racing cyclist. He rode in the Tour de France four times between 1985 and 1989 and in the 1984 Vuelta a España.

== Major results ==
1980
7th Overall Ruban Granitier Breton
1981
1st GP de Fourmies
1st Kattekoers
1st Paris-Troyes
1st Circuit du Port de Dunkerque
1982
1st Stage 4 Tour Méditerranéen
2nd Schaal Sels
4th Brabantse Pijl
5th Le Samyn
8th GP de Fourmies
1983
3rd De Kustpijl
8th Omloop Het Volk
1984
Vuelta a España

1st Stages 3 & 5

2nd Grand Prix of Aargau Canton
1985
1st Overall Tour de Picardie
1st Intermediate sprints classification Tour de France
1st Grote Prijs Jef Scherens
2nd E3 Harelbeke
2nd Scheldeprijs
2nd Amstel Gold Race
2nd Grand Prix Impanis-Van Petegem
3rd Dwars door België
3rd Omloop Het Volk
4th Overall Tour of Belgium

1st Stage 5

4th Paris–Brussels
5th Tour of Flanders
5th Rund um den Henninger Turm
6th Gent-Wevelgem
7th Paris-Roubaix
7th Overall KBC Driedaagse van De Panne-Koksijde
1986
1st GP de Fourmies
1st Grote Prijs Jef Scherens
1st Stage 2 KBC Driedaagse van De Panne-Koksijde
1st Stage 2 Tour de Luxembourg
1st Stage 5 Tour of Belgium
3rd Trofeo Mallorca
7th Paris-Tours
1987
1st Omloop van de Westhoek
2nd GP de Fourmies
2nd Paris–Brussels
2nd Leeuwse Pijl
4th Overall Tour de Luxembourg

1st Stages 2 & 5

7th Overall 4 Jours de Dunkerque

1st Stage 3b

1988
1st Stage 6b 4 Jours de Dunkerque
6th E3 Harelbeke
1989
1st Stage 2 Euskal Bizikleta
8th Amstel Gold Race
10th Gent-Wevelgem
10th GP de Fourmies
1990
2nd Trofeo Pantalica
