= 1985 Dwars door België =

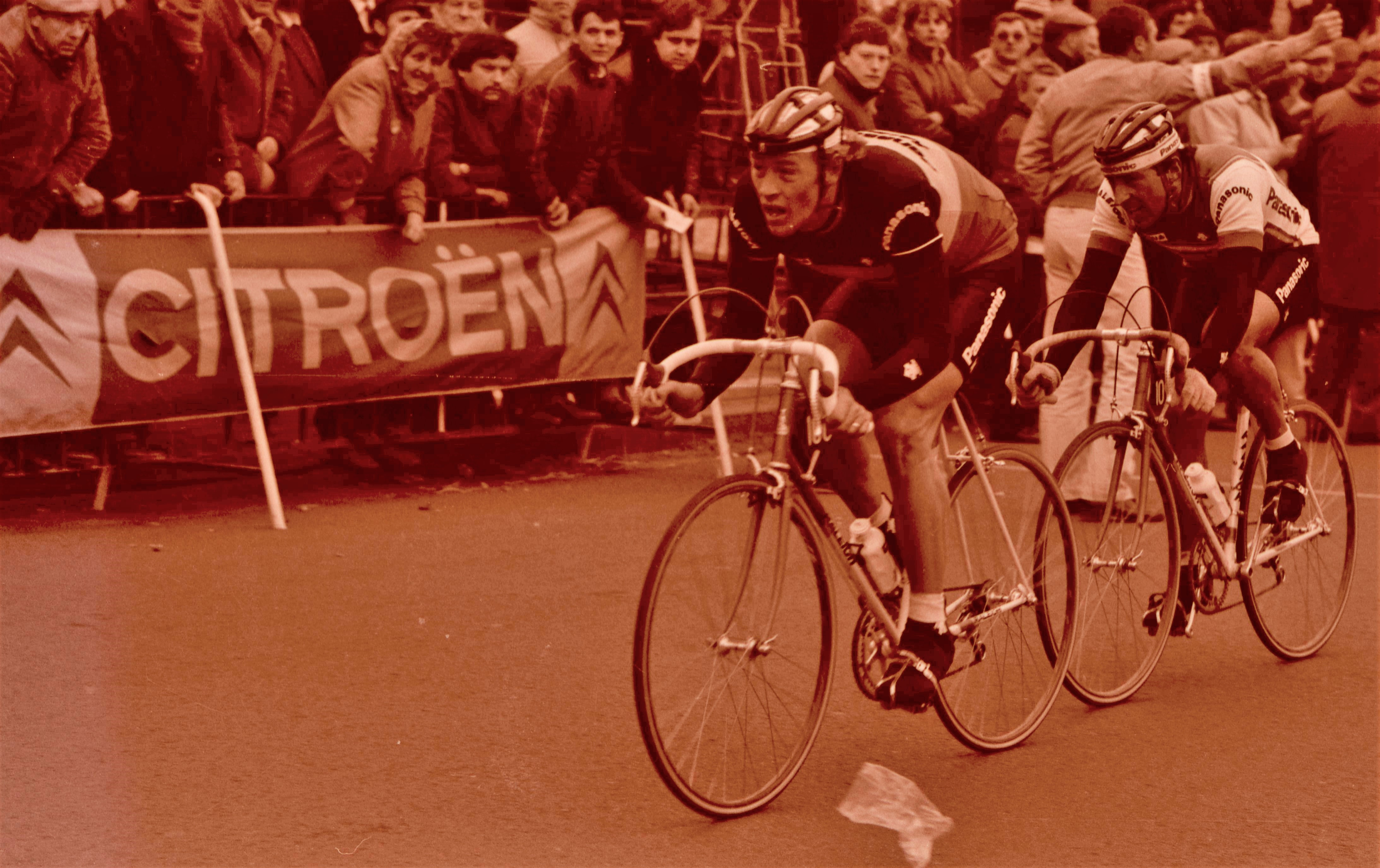
- Eddy Planckaert winning 1985 Dwars door België in Waregem (collection KOERS. Museum of cycle racing)

Race details
- Dates: 22 March 1985
- Stages: 1
- Distance: 240 km (149.1 mi)
- Winning time: 4h 52' 06"

Results
| | Winner | Eddy Planckaert (BEL) |
| | Second | Eric Vanderaerden (BEL) |
| | Third | Jozef Lieckens (BEL) |

The 1985 Dwars door België was the 40th edition of the Dwars door Vlaanderen cycle race and was held on 22 March 1985. The race started and finished in Waregem. The race was won by Eddy Planckaert.

== General classification ==
Final general classification

| Rank | Rider | Time |
|---|---|---|
| 1 | Eddy Planckaert (BEL) | 4h 52' 06" |
| 2 | Eric Vanderaerden (BEL) | + 0" |
| 3 | Jozef Lieckens (BEL) | + 3' 27" |
| 4 | Luc Colijn (BEL) | + 3' 27" |
| 5 | William Tackaert (BEL) | + 3' 27" |
| 6 | Luc Meersman (BEL) | + 3' 27" |
| 7 | Paul Haghedooren (BEL) | + 3' 27" |
| 8 | Ludo De Keulenaer (BEL) | + 3' 27" |
| 9 | Henri Manders (NED) | + 3' 27" |
| 10 | Jos Jacobs (BEL) | + 3' 27" |
