= Jörg Müller (cyclist) =

Swiss cyclist

Personal information
- Nickname: Jogi
- Born: 23 January 1961 (age 65) Aarau, Switzerland

Cycling career
- Sport: Cycling
- Disciplines: Road; Track
- Role: Rider

Professional teams
- 1985: Skil–Sem–Kas–Miko
- 1986: Kas
- 1987–1989: PDM–Ultima–Concorde
- 1990–1991: TVM
- 1992: Helvetia–Fichtel & Sachs
- 1993: CLAS–Cajastur
- 1994: Mapei–CLAS

Major wins
- Stage races Tour de Romandie (1985) One-day races and Classics National Road Race Championships (1987) Grand Prix des Amériques (1989)

Jörg Müller (born 23 February 1961) is a retired track cyclist and road bicycle racer from Switzerland, who was a professional rider from 1985 to 1994. He represented his native country at the 1984 Summer Olympics in Los Angeles. He won the Tour de Romandie in 1985. He was the Swiss National Road Race champion in 1987.

He is married to Alexandra Anka and has two children, Allegra and Alessio Anka-Müller. Paul Anka is his father-in-law. Jason Bateman is his brother-in-law.

== Career achievements ==
=== Major results ===
1984
1st Individual pursuit, National Track Championships
10th Overall GP Tell

1st Stage 2

1985
1st Overall Tour de Romandie
2nd Grand Prix Cycliste Union Bessègeoise
6th Critérium des As
8th Overall Tour of the Basque Country

1st Stage 5

8th La Flèche Wallonne
8th Paris–Camembert
8th Grand Prix des Nations
10th Overall Tour de Suisse

1st Stage 8

1986
1st Overall Tour d'Armorique
1st Prologue Volta a Catalunya
3rd Overall Volta a la Comunitat Valenciana

1st Stage 5

3rd Overall Vuelta a Aragón
4th Overall Vuelta a Andalucía
5th Paris–Tours
7th Overall Tour de Romandie
7th Giro di Lombardia
10th Overall Tour de Suisse
1987
1st Road race, National Road Championships
1st Stage 6 Volta a Catalunya
6th Overall Tour de Luxembourg
1988
1st Six Days of Zürich (with Daniel Gisiger)
8th Overall Vuelta a Andalucía
1989
1st Grand Prix des Amériques
3rd Overall Tour de Suisse
6th Overall Four Days of Dunkirk
1990
10th Trofeo Baracchi
1993
1st Wartenberg Rundfahrt
1st Stage 9 Tour DuPont
4th Josef Voegeli Memorial
1994
1st Wartenberg Rundfahrt

=== Grand Tour general classification results timeline ===
Grand Tour	1986	1987	1988	1989	1990	1991	1992	1993	1994
Giro d'Italia	—	—	55	—	—	71	—	—	—
Tour de France	99	99	27	29	31	—	94	52	59
Vuelta a España	—	DSQ	—	—	—	101	—	—	64
