= 1983 E3 Prijs Vlaanderen =

1983 E3 Harelbeke
Race details
- Dates: 26 March 1983
- Stages: 1
- Distance: 236 km (147 mi)
- Winning time: 6h 21' 00"

Results
	Winner	William Tackaert (BEL)	(Splendor–Euro Shop)
	Second	Bert Oosterbosch (NED)	(TI–Raleigh–Campagnolo)
	Third	Jan Jonkers (NED)	(Beckers Snacks)

The 1983 E3 Harelbeke was the 26th edition of the E3 Harelbeke cycle race and was held on 26 March 1983. The race started and finished in Harelbeke. The race was won by William Tackaert of the Splendor team.

== General classification ==
Final general classification

Rank	Rider	Team	Time
1	William Tackaert (BEL)	Splendor–Euro Shop	6h 21' 00"
2	Bert Oosterbosch (NED)	TI–Raleigh–Campagnolo	+ 0"
3	Jan Jonkers (NED)	Beckers Snacks	+ 0"
4	Étienne De Beule (BEL)	Europ Decor–Dries	+ 24"
5	Heddie Nieuwdorp (NED)	Beckers Snacks	+ 24"
6	Jos Schipper (NED)	Elro–Auto Brabant	+ 1' 37"
7	Ad van Peer (NED)	Beckers Snacks	+ 1' 37"
8	Etienne De Wilde (BEL)	La Redoute–Motobécane	+ 1' 57"
9	Luc Colijn (BEL)	Fangio–Tönissteiner	+ 1' 57"
10	Ronan De Meyer (BEL)	Boule d'Or–Colnago	+ 1' 57"
