= Ludwig Willems =

Belgian cyclist

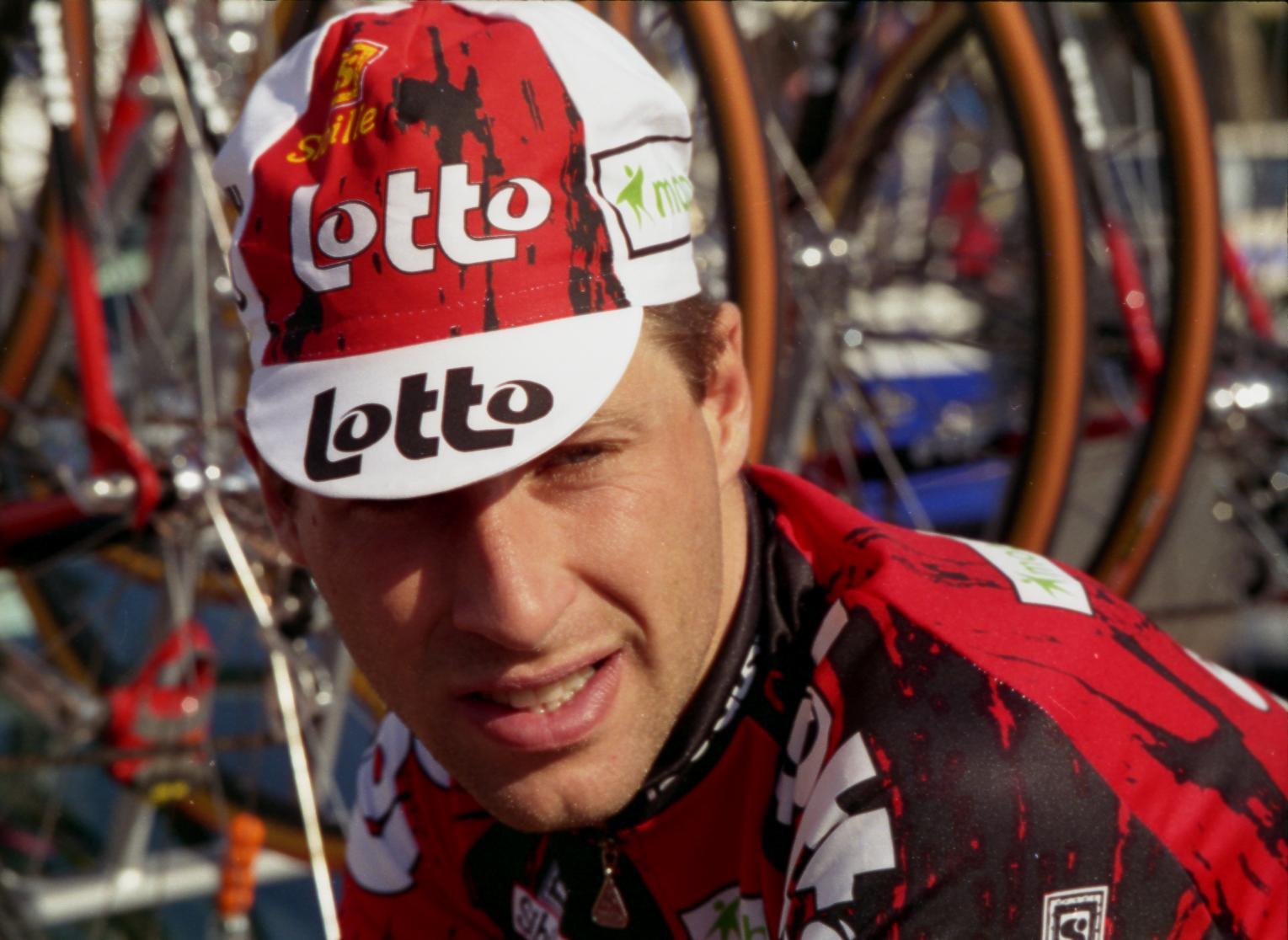

Personal information
- Full name: Ludwig Willems
- Born: 7 February 1966 (age 60) Herentals, Belgium

Cycling career
- Sport: Cycling
- Current team: Retired
- Discipline: Road
- Role: Rider

Professional teams
- 1987–1990: Lotto–Merckx
- 1991: Weinmann–Eddy Merckx
- 1992–1994: GB–MG Maglificio
- 1995–1996: Mapei–GB–Latexco
- 1997–1998: Lotto–Mobistar–Isoglass

Ludwig Willems (born 7 February 1966 in Herentals) is a Belgian former cyclist.

== Major results ==
1988
1st Stage 6 Tour de l'Avenir
1994
3rd Dwars door Vlaanderen
8th Paris–Roubaix
