= Hubert Graignic =

French cyclist

Personal information
- Born: 24 September 1957 (age 69) Guémené-sur-Scorff, Brittany, France

Cycling career
- Sport: Cycling
- Role: Rider

Hubert Graignic (born 24 September 1957) is a French former professional racing cyclist. He rode in the 1982 Tour de France.
