= José Luis Rodriguez Inguanzo =

Spanish cyclist

Personal information
- Born: 20 April 1957 Santillana del Mar, Spain
- Died: 18 December 1982 (aged 25) Las Palmas, Spain

Cycling career
- Sport: Cycling
- Role: Rider

José Luis Rodriguez Inguanzo (20 April 1957 – 18 December 1982) was a Spanish professional racing cyclist. He rode in the 1982 Tour de France.
