= Luc De Smet =

Belgian cyclist

Personal information
- Born: 30 August 1957 (age 69) Wetteren, Belgium

Cycling career
- Sport: Cycling

Luc De Smet (born 30 August 1957) is a Belgian former cyclist. He competed in the individual road race event at the 1980 Summer Olympics.
