= Enzo Serpelloni =

Italian cyclist

Personal information
- Born: 9 December 1959 (age 66) Veneto, Italy

Cycling career
- Sport: Cycling
- Role: Rider

Enzo Serpelloni (born 9 December 1959) is an Italian former professional racing cyclist. He rode in the 1982 Tour de France.
