= Danny Schoobaert =

Belgian cyclist

Personal information
- Born: 11 March 1960 (age 66) Asse, Belgium

Cycling career
- Sport: Cycling
- Role: Rider

Danny Schoobaert (born 11 March 1960) is a Belgian former professional racing cyclist. He rode in the 1982 Tour de France.
