= William Tackaert =

Belgian cyclist

Personal information
- Born: 9 August 1956 (age 70) Zele, Belgium

Cycling career
- Sport: Cycling
- Discipline: Road
- Role: Rider

Professional teams
- 1979–1982: DAF Trucks–Aida
- 1983–1986: Fangio–Tönissteiner–OM Trucks–Mavic
- 1987: AD Renting–Fangio–IOC–MBK

William Tackaert (born 9 August 1956) is a Belgian former racing cyclist. He rode in five editions of the Tour de France between 1979 and 1983. He most notably won the 1983 E3 Harelbeke and the 1985 Kuurne–Brussels–Kuurne.

== Major results ==
1979
1st Stage 1 Driedaagse van De Panne-Koksijde
2nd Nokere Koerse
1980
1st Stage 2a Étoile des Espoirs
2nd Omloop Mandel-Leie-Schelde
4th Ronde van Limburg
5th GP Stad Zottegem
8th Paris–Roubaix
8th Scheldeprijs
1981
1st Stage 3a Critérium du Dauphiné Libéré
2nd Nationale Sluitingprijs
3rd Stadsprijs Geraardsbergen
7th Druivenkoers-Overijse
8th Overall Tour of Belgium
10th Omloop Het Volk
1982
1st Nokere Koerse
3rd Omloop van de Westhoek
6th Overall Tour de Luxembourg
8th Grand Prix Cerami
1983
1st E3 Harelbeke
1st Omloop Mandel-Leie-Schelde
2nd Grand Prix de Denain
3rd Overall Four Days of Dunkirk
3rd Ronde van Limburg
4th Overall Driedaagse van De Panne-Koksijde
6th Le Samyn
1984
2nd Overall Tour de Luxembourg

1st Stage 1

2nd La Flèche Wallonne
3rd Druivenkoers-Overijse
3rd Grand Prix Cerami
4th Circuit des Frontières
4th Nokere Koerse
5th Le Samyn
6th Amstel Gold Race
6th E3 Harelbeke
8th Grote Prijs Jef Scherens
10th Scheldeprijs
1985
1st Kuurne–Brussels–Kuurne
2nd Overall Tour de Luxembourg
2nd Brussels–Ingooigem
2nd Binche–Tournai–Binche
2nd Circuit des Frontières
2nd Omloop Schelde-Durme
3rd Overall Herald Sun Tour

1st Stage 4

3rd Omloop van het Leiedal
4th Grand Prix Cerami
4th Le Samyn
5th E3 Harelbeke
5th Gent–Wevelgem
5th Scheldeprijs
5th Dwars door België
9th Overall Driedaagse van De Panne-Koksijde

1st Stage 1a

1986
3rd Le Samyn
4th Druivenkoers-Overijse
7th Nokere Koerse
8th Grand Prix Impanis-Van Petegem

=== Grand Tour general classification results timeline ===
Grand Tour	1979	1980	1981	1982	1983	1984	1985	1986
Giro d'Italia	—	—	—	—	—	—	—	—
Tour de France	DNF	82	93	DNF	DNF	—	—	—
Vuelta a España	—	—	—	—	—	—	—	DNF
