= Kebraty =

Kebraty Кебраты
- Settlement
- Location within Perm Krai Location within Russia
- Coordinates: 60°22′N 54°12′E
- Country: Russia
- Region: Perm Krai
- District: Gaynsky District
- Time zone: UTC+5:00

Kebraty (Russian: Кебраты) is a rural locality (a settlement) and the administrative center of Kebratskoye Rural Settlement, Gaynsky District, Perm Krai, Russia. The population was 858 as of 2010. There are 15 streets.

== Geography ==
Kebraty is located 17 km northwest of Gayny (the district's administrative centre) by road. Shordyn is the nearest rural locality.
