= Pascal Guyot =

French cyclist

Personal information
- Born: 26 December 1959 (age 66) Belfort, France

Cycling career
- Sport: Cycling
- Role: Rider

Pascal Guyot (born 26 December 1959) is a French former professional racing cyclist. He rode in two editions of the Tour de France.
