= Giuliano Biatta =

Italian cyclist (born 1957)

Personal information
- Born: 14 May 1957 (age 69) Pompiano, Italy

Cycling career
- Sport: Cycling
- Role: Rider

Giuliano Biatta (born 14 May 1957) is an Italian former professional racing cyclist. He rode in the 1982 Tour de France.
