= Ludo Frijns =

Belgian cyclist

Personal information
- Born: 22 March 1957 (age 69) Tongeren, Belgium

Cycling career
- Sport: Cycling
- Role: Rider

Ludo Frijns (born 22 March 1957) is a Belgian former professional racing cyclist. He rode in the 1982 Tour de France.
