= Gérard Kerbrat =

French cyclist

Personal information
- Born: 1 April 1956 (age 70) Brest, France

Cycling career
- Sport: Cycling
- Role: Rider

Gérard Kerbrat (born 1 April 1956) is a French former professional racing cyclist. He rode in the 1982 Tour de France.
