= Phil Anderson (cyclist) =

Australian cyclist (born 1958)

Phil Anderson OAM
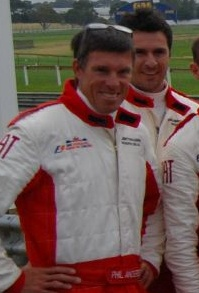
- Anderson in 2008

Personal information
- Full name: Philip Grant Anderson
- Nicknames: Skippy, Dr Teeth
- Born: 20 March 1958 (age 68) London, England

Cycling career
- Sport: Cycling
- Discipline: Road
- Role: Rider

Amateur teams
- <1979: Hawthorn Cycling Club
- 1979: Athletic Club de Boulogne-Billancourt

Professional teams
- 1980–1983: Peugeot–Esso–Michelin
- 1984–1987: Panasonic
- 1988–1990: TVM
- 1991–1994: Motorola

Major wins
- Grand Tours Tour de France Young rider classification (1982) 2 individual stages (1982, 1991) Giro d'Italia Intergiro classification (1990) 2 individual stages (1989, 1990) Stage races Critérium du Dauphiné Libéré (1985) Tour de Suisse (1985) Danmark Rundt (1988) Tour de Romandie (1989) One-day races and Classics Amstel Gold Race (1983) Züri-Metzgete (1984) Frankfurt Grand Prix (1984, 1985) E3 Prijs Vlaanderen (1985) Paris–Tours (1986) Milano–Torino (1987)
Medal record
Men's road bicycle racing
Representing Australia
Commonwealth Games
Gold medal – first place	1978 Edmonton	Road Race
Gold medal – first place	1994 Victoria	Team Time Trial

Philip Grant Anderson OAM (born 20 March 1958) is an Australian former professional racing cyclist who was the first non-European to wear the yellow jersey of the Tour de France.

== Origins ==
Phil Anderson was born in London but moved to Melbourne, Australia, when he was young. He grew up in the suburb of Kew and graduated from Trinity Grammar School in 1975. He first raced with Hawthorn Cycling Club, where Allan Peiper, another future professional, was also a member. Peiper said: "Phil went to a private school and joined the club with his mate, Peter Darbyshire. My best friend was Tom Sawyer, later a six-day racer in Europe, and we were the two rough nuts, while Phil and Darbs were the two upper-class boys".

== Amateur career ==
Anderson won the 1977 Dulux Tour of the North Island in New Zealand and the Australian team time-trial championship at Brisbane in 1978. In that year he also won the Commonwealth Games road race in Edmonton, Alberta, Canada. He was 19.

He moved to France in 1979 to join the ACBB, a club at Boulogne-Billancourt in the suburbs of Paris with a reputation of placing riders in professional teams, particularly Peugeot. Whilst he was with the ACBB he lived and raced alongside Robert Millar and Mark Bell. That season he won the Tour de l'Essonne, the Tour de l'Hérault and the amateur version of the unofficial world time-trial championship, the Grand Prix des Nations, in Cannes.

== Professional career ==
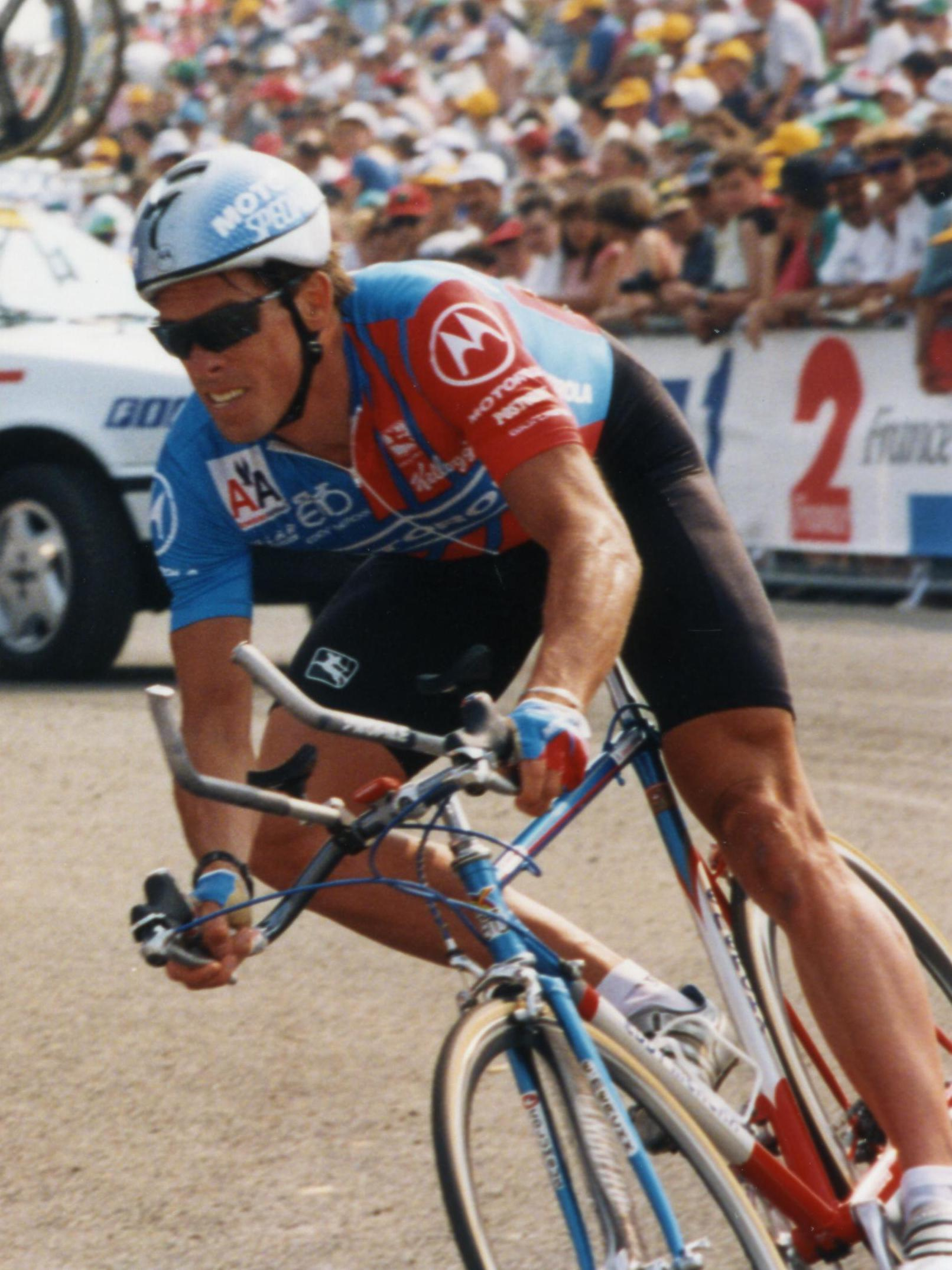
Anderson at the 1993 Tour de France

Anderson turned professional in 1980, for Peugeot, one of the oldest French teams. He won two races in his first season – the Prix de Wetteren and a stage in the Étoile des Espoirs, and came second in two others. He moved to Lokeren, Belgium, to ride criteriums.

It was a big change; I'd never lived out of home before, so that was a big difference, and then there's the length of the races; you know all of a sudden you're riding 200 km a day instead of back here you'd be racing 80 or 100 km a day; huge fields, you turn up at a race and you'd have 200 riders, 250 riders. It's difficult because I was on a French team, and I felt that the French riders got priority, and I had to go a bit deeper or had to be a little better than some of my colleagues on the team. But that hardened me, and put pressure on me, and I think became part of my make-up in the end.

He came fifth in the 1982 Tour de France, in which he held the white jersey of best young rider, and again fifth in 1985, the year he won the Tour de Suisse. That same season he finished second in the Super Prestige Pernod International, forerunner of the UCI points championship. His highlights were wearing the yellow jersey of the 1981 Tour de France and then again for nine days of 1982. He was the first rider from outside Europe to lead the race. Anderson described what it meant in 1981:

It happened in the Pyrenees. This was my first Tour de France. I didn't have aspirations of becoming the wearer of the yellow jersey or anything like that. I was given my instructions and I was supposed to look after a rider on my team, the team leader, a Frenchman, and I forgot my instructions and just sort of went into survival mode over a number of mountain passes, just staying up with some of the top riders, and before I knew it, my team director came up beside me in his car and told me, 'Listen, what happened to your leader, the guy that you've been instructed to watch today?' you know. And to help if he has any troubles, or just pace him back if he's having some troubles. And I said, 'Oh gee, that's right. Where is he?' And he said, 'he's five or ten minutes back, in the next group.' I said, 'No worries I'll wait up for him.' He said, 'No, no, stay up here, you're doing OK, just stay out of trouble and try and hang on as long as possible.'

So hang on I did, and whistled down the next mountain and got to the last climb and I stayed up with Bernard Hinault; there was one rider, a Belgian rider, Lucien Van Impe rode away, an excellent climber, he rode away and so we came in a couple of minutes later, but I had enough time from some good days previously, that I climbed into the yellow jersey, and I had no idea of what the sort of yellow jersey represented, because I mean there's so much history to it, and for me it was just like, 'Oh yes, great, I don't have to wash my old jersey tonight, you know, get a new one'. But really, you're sort of at the highest level of the sport.

His best year was 1985, when he won the Tour Méditerranéen, Critérium du Dauphiné Libéré and the Tour de Suisse, as well as finishing second in the Tour of Flanders and Gent–Wevelgem. He continued to ride the Tour until 1989, when he came 38th, but by then he had arthritis. In 1991 he joined the American team, 7-Eleven – "Speculation has it that he took a big pay cut; maybe that is what turned into motivation which resulted in his comeback to the big league", said Peiper – and he won the Tour Méditerranéen and the Tour of Sicily and stages of the Tour de Suisse and Tour de France. He also won the Tour of Britain in 1991 and 1993.

== Retirement and honours ==
Anderson retired to a farm he bought in Jamieson and has what he calls the life of a gentleman farmer. He was given the Medal of the Order of Australia (OAM) in the 1987 Australia Day Honours for service to cycling. In 2000, he received the Australian Sports Medal and in 2001 he received a Centenary Medal for service to society through cycling. He was inducted into the Sport Australia Hall of Fame in 2010. In 2015, he was an inaugural Cycling Australia Hall of Fame inductee.

== Private life ==
Anderson has married twice, first to Anne, whom he married just after turning professional, and then Christi Valentine, who in 1999 wrote Anderson's biography, Phil Anderson: Cycling Legend. Anderson and Valentine married on 29 April 1994 and separated in 2005. Anderson has been in a relationship with Anne Newell since 2006.

== Career achievements ==
=== Major results ===
1978
1st Road race, Commonwealth Games
1st Stage 2 Red Zinger Bicycle Classic
1980
2nd Overall Étoile des Espoirs

1st Stage 3

3rd Overall Paris–Bourges
10th Paris–Tours
1981
1st Overall Tour de l'Aude
1st Stage 6 Paris–Nice
6th Grand Prix de Cannes
7th Amstel Gold Race
7th Tour du Haut Var
9th Overall Tour Méditerranéen
9th Grand Prix de Monaco
10th Overall Tour de France

Held after Stage 6

1982
4th Overall Tour de l'Aude
5th Overall Tour de France

1st Young rider classification
1st Stage 2
Held after Stages 2–11

5th Amstel Gold Race
6th Rund um den Henninger Turm
7th Overall Critérium du Dauphiné Libéré
7th Gent–Wevelgem
8th GP Ouest-France
9th La Flèche Wallonne
1983
1st Overall Tour de l'Aude

1st Stage 3

1st Amstel Gold Race
2nd Overall Tour de Romandie

1st Stage 5a

3rd Overall Paris–Bourges
3rd Liège–Bastogne–Liège
3rd Grand Prix de Wallonie
6th Overall Critérium du Dauphiné Libéré

1st Points classification
1st Prologue & Stage 3

6th Grand Prix de Monaco
7th Super Prestige Pernod International
8th Overall Tour Midi-Pyrénées
8th Giro di Lombardia
9th Road race, UCI Road World Championships
9th Overall Tour de France
9th Tour of Flanders
10th Rund um den Henninger Turm
1984
1st Overall Setmana Catalana de Ciclisme

1st Stage 4b (ITT)

1st Züri-Metzgete
1st Rund um den Henninger Turm
2nd Liège–Bastogne–Liège
3rd Super Prestige Pernod International
4th Grand Prix of Aargau Canton
5th Overall Tour de Suisse
5th Paris–Tours
7th Overall Critérium du Dauphiné Libéré

1st Stage 6

7th Paris–Brussels
9th La Flèche Wallonne
9th Kuurne–Brussels–Kuurne
10th Overall Tour de France
1985
1st Overall Tour de Suisse

1st Points classification
1st Mountains classification
1st Stages 3, 5b (ITT) & 8

1st Overall Critérium du Dauphiné Libéré

1st Points classification
1st Stage 1b

1st Overall Tour Méditerranéen

1st Stage 4b

1st Rund um den Henninger Turm
1st E3 Prijs Vlaanderen
2nd Overall Tour of Belgium

1st Stages 2 & 3b (ITT)

2nd Overall Setmana Catalana de Ciclisme

1st Stages 2 & 3

2nd Tour of Flanders
2nd Gent–Wevelgem
2nd Super Prestige Pernod International
3rd Grand Prix Eddy Merckx
4th Overall Paris–Nice

1st Stage 4b (TTT)

4th Brabantse Pijl
4th Grand Prix of Aargau Canton
5th Overall Tour de France
5th Amstel Gold Race
7th Liège–Bastogne–Liège
1986
1st Paris–Tours
3rd Overall Coors Classic

1st Stage 3

3rd Giro di Lombardia
5th Grand Prix d'Isbergues
9th Overall Nissan Classic

1st Stages 3b & 4

1987
1st Milano–Torino
5th Kuurne–Brussels–Kuurne
6th Amstel Gold Race
7th Overall Giro d'Italia
7th E3 Prijs Vlaanderen
7th Grand Prix Impanis
7th Druivenkoers Overijse
8th Grand Prix Pino Cerami
9th Rund um den Henninger Turm
10th Gent–Wevelgem
1988
1st Overall Danmark Rundt

1st Stage 3

Nissan Classic

1st Stage 2 & 4

2nd Tour of Flanders
2nd Milano–Torino
6th Züri-Metzgete
7th Overall Tirreno–Adriatico

1st Stage 1 (ITT)

8th Kuurne–Brussels–Kuurne
9th Liège–Bastogne–Liège
10th Overall Tour de Luxembourg
1989
1st Overall Tour de Romandie

1st Stage 1

1st Stage 17 Giro d'Italia
1st Stage 5b Nissan Classic
3rd Liège–Bastogne–Liège
4th Overall Three Days of De Panne
7th Overall Kellogg's Tour

1st Stage 2

10th Trofeo Pantalica
1990
Giro d'Italia

1st Intergiro classification
1st Stage 4b

1st Stage 5 Tour de Luxembourg
2nd Paris–Tours
4th Overall Three Days of De Panne
10th Amstel Gold Race
1991
1st Overall Kellogg's Tour

1st Mountains classification
1st Stages 1 & 3

1st Overall Tour Méditerranéen

1st Stages 5 & 6

1st Overall Settimana Internazionale di Coppi e Bartali

1st Stage 6

1st Stage 10 Tour de France
1st Stage 8 Tour de Suisse
1st Stage 4 Tour DuPont
2nd E3 Prijs Vlaanderen
3rd US Pro Championship
7th Milan–San Remo
7th Züri-Metzgete
10th UCI Road World Cup
1992
1st Overall Nissan Classic

1st Stage 4

1st Grand Prix d'Isbergues
3rd Overall Settimana Internazionale di Coppi e Bartali
3rd Paris–Brussels
5th Overall Tour DuPont

1st Stages 5, 8 & 9

6th Paris–Tours
10th Overall Kellogg's Tour
1993
1st Overall Kellogg's Tour

1st Stage 1

1st Overall Tour of Sweden

1st Stage 4

1st Grand Prix Impanis
7th Overall Tour de Luxembourg
1994
1st Team time trial, Commonwealth Games
3rd Trofeo Luis Puig
3rd Monte Carlo–Alassio
9th Overall Tour de Luxembourg

==== General classification results timeline ====
Grand Tour general classification results
Race	1981	1982	1983	1984	1985	1986	1987	1988	1989	1990	1991	1992	1993	1994
Vuelta a España	—	—	—	—	—	—	—	—	—	—	—	—	—	—
Giro d'Italia	—	—	—	—	—	—	7	—	13	33	—	—	—	—
Tour de France	10	5	9	10	5	39	27	—	38	71	45	81	84	69
Major stage race general classification results
Major stage race	1981	1982	1983	1984	1985	1986	1987	1988	1989	1990	1991	1992	1993	1994
Paris–Nice	—	16	—	5	4	—	—	—	—	—	11	19	—	—
Tirreno–Adriatico	—	—	—	—	—	—	—	7	—	—	—	—	—	—
Tour of the Basque Country	—	—	—	—	—	—	—	—	—	—	—	45	60	54
Tour de Romandie	—	—	2	—	—	—	—	—	1	13	—	—	—	—
Critérium du Dauphiné	20	7	6	7	1	—	—	—	—	—	—	—	—	—
Tour de Suisse	—	—	—	5	1	26	—	27	—	—	31	20	—	30
Volta a Catalunya	—	—	—	—	—	—	—	—	—	—	—	—	—	—

Legend
—	Did not compete
DNF	Did not finish

== See also ==
- List of Australians who have led the Tour de France general classification
