= Marc Sergeant =

Belgian cyclist (born 1959)

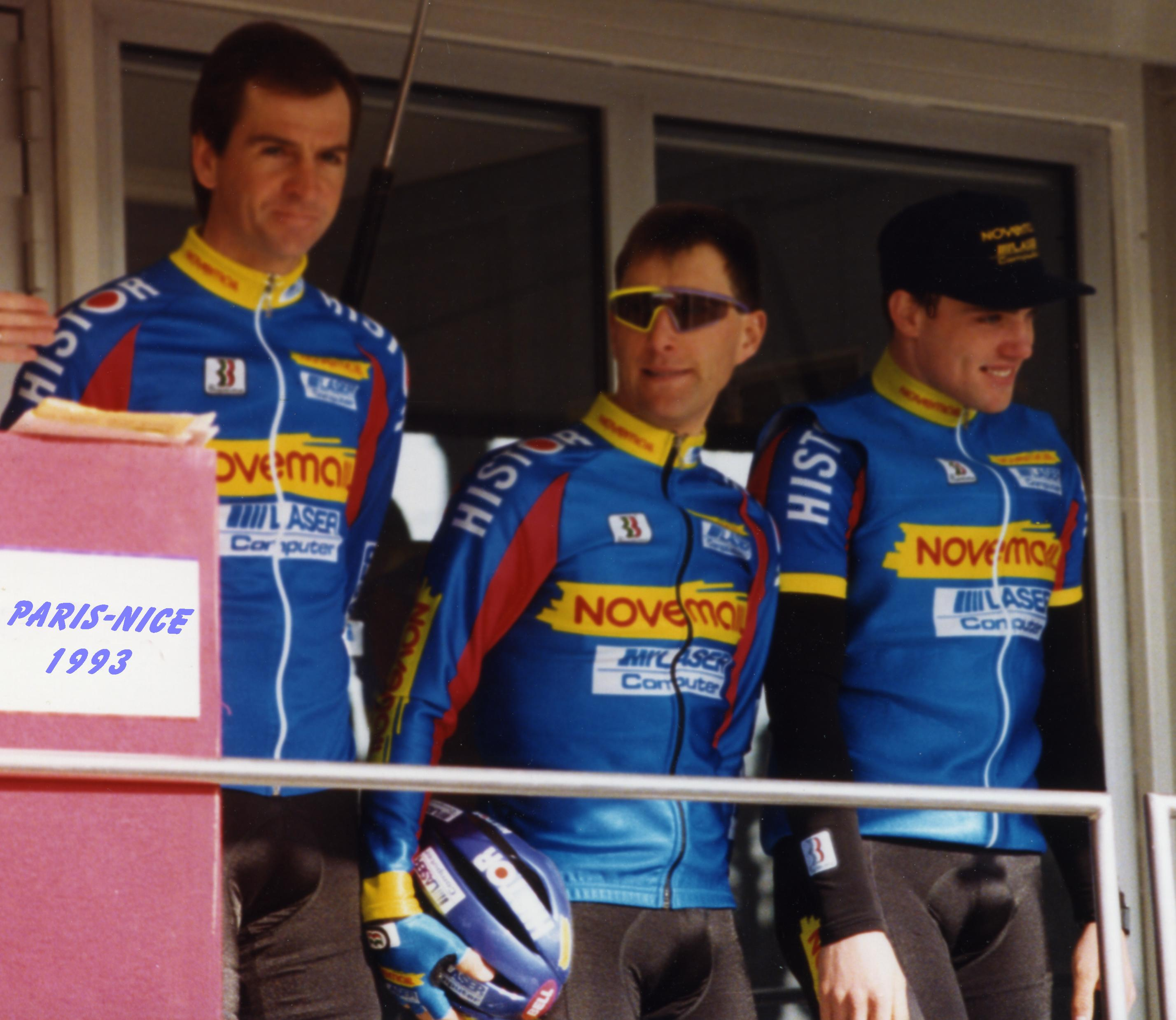
- Sergeant (left)

Personal information
- Full name: Marc Sergeant
- Born: 16 August 1959 (age 67) Aalst, East Flanders, Belgium

Cycling career
- Sport: Cycling
- Current team: Retired
- Discipline: Road
- Role: Rider; Team manager

Professional teams
- 1981–1982: Boule d'Or–Sunair
- 1983–1984: Europ Decor–Dries
- 1985–1987: Lotto
- 1988–1989: Hitachi–Bosal–B.C.E. Snooker
- 1990–1992: Panasonic–Sportlife
- 1993–1994: Novemail–Histor–Laser Computer
- 1995–1996: Lotto–Isoglass

Managerial teams
- 1999–2000: Mapei–Quick-Step
- 2001–2002: Domo–Farm Frites–Latexco
- 2003–2021: Lotto–Domo

Major wins
- Grand Tours Tour de France 1 individual stage (1987) 2 TTT stages (1990, 1992) One-day races and Classics National Road Race Championships (1986)

Marc Sergeant (born 16 August 1959) is a Belgian former professional road bicycle racer. He competed in the team time trial event at the 1980 Summer Olympics. After Sergeant stopped his cycling career, he became team manager at Lotto–Soudal. He left his management role at the end of the 2021 season. Sergeant finished a total of 6 times in the top 10 of Tour of Flanders.

== Major results ==
1981
1st Road race, National Amateur Road Championships
2nd Ghent–Wevelgem U23
2nd Circuit de Wallonie
3rd Circuit des Frontières
5th Ronde van Vlaanderen U23
1982
1st Overall, Vuelta a Andalucía

1st Stage 3

1st Stage 6, Four Days of Dunkirk
7th Paris–Roubaix
9th Tour of Flanders
9th Overall Tour of the Netherlands
1983
1st Londerzeel
2nd Road race, National Road Championships
2nd Leeuwse Pijl
3rd Tour of Flanders
6th Grand Prix Eddy Merckx
8th Polder-Kempen
1984
1st Stage 5, Tour de Suisse
2nd Overall Tour of Belgium
3rd Dwars door België
3rd Grand Prix Eddy Merckx
9th Grote Prijs Jef Scherens
1985
1st Oostkamp & Temse
2nd Kuurne–Brussels–Kuurne
3rd Druivenkoers Overijse
8th Grand Prix Eddy Merckx
9th E3 Prijs Vlaanderen
10th Amstel Gold Race
1986
1st Road race, National Road Championships
2nd Overall Étoile de Bessèges

1st Stage 3

2nd Overall Tour of Belgium
2nd Le Samyn
4th Tour du Haut Var
6th Dwars door België
6th Liège–Bastogne–Liège
6th Circuit des Frontières
7th Paris–Roubaix
8th Amstel Gold Race
10th Overall Tour de Romandie
1987
1st Stage 5, Tour de France
1st Profronde van Almelo
2nd Overall Ronde van Nederland

1st Stage 2

3rd E3 Prijs Vlaanderen
4th Overall Tour du Haut Var
4th Overall La Méditerranéenne
5th Tour of Flanders
5th Road race, National Road Championships
7th Overall Classic Brugge–De Panne
7th Paris–Roubaix
8th Overall Four Days of Dunkirk
9th Omloop Het Volk
9th Druivenkoers Overijse
1988
1st Druivenkoers Overijse
1st Stage 1 Euskal Bizikleta
4th Overall Four Days of Dunkirk
5th Overall Tour of Belgium
5th Paris–Roubaix
5th Amstel Gold Race
6th Tour of Flanders
6th Kuurne–Brussels–Kuurne
6th De Brabantse Pijl
7th Overall Ronde van Nederland

1st Stage 6

7th Dwars door België
9th Circuit des XI Villes
10th Omloop Het Volk
1989
1st Oostrozebeke
3rd E3 Prijs Vlaanderen
4th Omloop van het Leiedal
6th Tour of Flanders
8th Overall Tour of Belgium
8th Circuit des Frontières
1990
1st Stage 3 (TTT) Tour de France
2nd Omloop van de Westhoek
3rd Dwars door België
5th, Wincanton Classic
1991
6th Overall Vuelta a Andalucía
6th Gent–Wevelgem
6th Grand Prix de Fourmies
7th Trofeo Luis Puig
7th Memorial Rik Van Steenbergen
8th Omloop Het Volk
8th Paris–Roubaix
8th De Kustpijl
10th Tour of Flanders
1992
1st De Haan
1st Stage 4 (TTT) Tour de France
10th Druivenkoers Overijse
1993
4th Tour of Flanders
7th Paris–Roubaix
9th Dwars door België
1994
2nd Dwars door België
8th Tour of Flanders
1995
4th Binche–Chimay–Binche
5th Halle–Ingooigem
6th Grand Prix La Marseillaise

=== Grand Tour general classification results timeline ===
Grand Tour	1983	1984	1985	1986	1987	1988	1989	1990	1991	1992	1993	1994	1995
Vuelta a España	Did Not contest during Career												
Giro d'Italia	32	—	—	—	—	—	—	—	—	—	—	—	—
Tour de France	—	48	59	DNF	DNF	33	61	62	81	66	69	DNF	DNF

Legend
—	Did not compete
DNF	Did not finish
