= Eric Vanderaerden =

Belgian cyclist (born 1962)

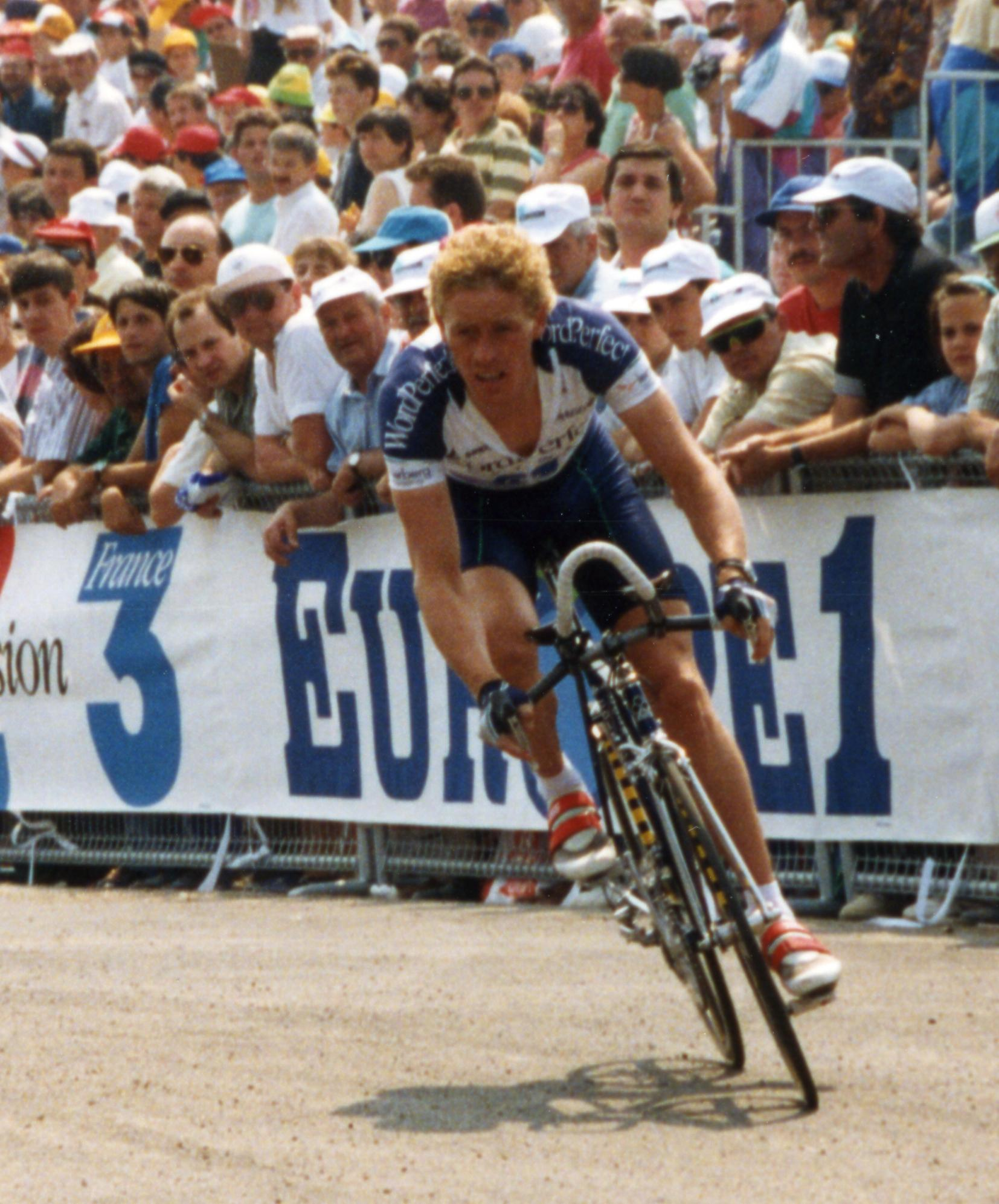
- Vanderaerden at the 1993 Tour de France

Personal information
- Full name: Eric Vanderaerden
- Born: 11 February 1962 (age 64) Lummen, Belgium

Cycling career
- Sport: Cycling
- Current team: Retired
- Discipline: Road
- Role: Rider
- Rider type: Sprinter

Professional teams
- 1983: Jacky Aernoudt–Rossin–Campagnolo
- 1984–1989: Panasonic–Raleigh
- 1990–1993: Buckler–Colnago–Decca
- 1994–1995: Brescialat–Ceramiche Refin
- 1996: San Marco Group
- 1996: Palmans–Boghemans

Major wins
- Grand Tours Tour de France Points classification (1986) 5 individual stages (1983, 1984, 1985) Vuelta a España 3 individual stages (1983, 1992) Stage races Three Days of De Panne (1986, 1987, 1988, 1989, 1993) One-day races and Classics National Road Race Championships (1984) Tour of Flanders (1985) Paris–Roubaix (1987) Gent–Wevelgem (1985) E3 Prijs Vlaanderen (1986)

Eric Vanderaerden (born 11 February 1962) is a Belgian retired road cyclist.

He was a considerable talent, winning the prologue time trial of the Vuelta a España in his debut year of 1983. During the 1983 Tour de France he also won the prologue and held the yellow jersey for two days. During the 1984 Tour de France he won two stages, including the final stage of the race which finished on the Champs-Élysées in Paris. His participation in the 1985 edition was a strong one, beating the eventual Tour winner Bernard Hinault in a time trial stage. He held the yellow jersey again during this tour, this time for three days. The following year, he won the green jersey.

In subsequent years, he won two monument races: in 1985, at 23, he won the storm ridden edition of the Tour of Flanders, and in 1987 he won Paris–Roubaix.

After 1988, his career went in decline and, despite his talent, he failed to win major races. He certainly had considerable talent as a time trial racer, but as a climber in the mountains his talent was limited. Perhaps, he was partly a victim of the high expectations the Belgian public had to get a successor for Eddy Merckx, a cyclist who was very versatile in winning both classic races and big stage races.

After his active career, Vanderaerden has led a few semi-professional racing teams and was also assistant-manager of a professional Belgo-Italian team. He became a directeur sportif with the DFL-Cyclingnews-Litespeed team in August 2006. His son Michael Vanderaerden signed a contract with the team in September 2007. In 2022 he became VIP driver for the Alpecin-Deceuninck World Tour team.

== Major results ==
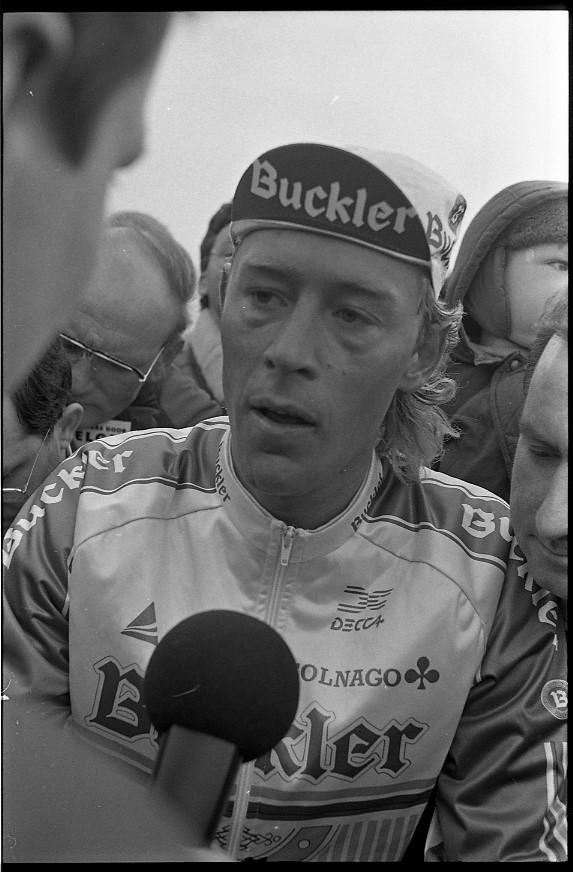
Eric Vanderaerden gives an interview after victory during Dwars door België 1991 (Maurice Terryn, collection KOERS. Museum of Cycle Racing)

1982
1st Flèche Ardennaise
1983
Tour de France

1st Prologue
Held for two days

Vuelta a España

1st Stages 2 & 11

3rd Dwars door België
4th Milan–San Remo
5th Kuurne–Brussels–Kuurne
1984
1st Road race, National Road Championships
Tour de France

1st Stages 10 & 23

Tour de Suisse

1st Prologue, Stages 2 & 7

1st Paris–Brussels
2nd Overall Three Days of De Panne
2nd Gent–Wevelgem
2nd Rund um den Henninger Turm
3rd Milan–San Remo
9th Omloop Het Volk
10th Tour of Flanders
10th Nokere Koerse
1985
Tour de France

1st Stages 13 (ITT) & 19
Held for three days

1st Tour of Flanders
1st Gent–Wevelgem
1st Grand Prix Eddy Merckx
1st Ronde van Nederland
1st Stage 5 Tour de Suisse
2nd Dwars door België
4th Milan–San Remo
4th Rund um den Henninger Turm
1986
1st Points classification Tour de France
1st Overall Three Days of De Panne
1st Halle–Ingooigem
1st Dwars door België
1st E3 Prijs Vlaanderen
1st Trofeo Isla de Mallorca
3rd Scheldeprijs
10th Tour of Flanders
1987
1st Overall Three Days of De Panne
1st Paris–Roubaix
1st Grand Prix Eddy Merckx
2nd Milan–San Remo
3rd Tour of Flanders
5th Omloop Het Volk
8th Gent–Wevelgem
1988
1st Overall Three Days of De Panne
1st Ronde van Limburg
1989
1st Overall Three Days of De Panne
1st Overall Nissan Classic
1st GP Impanis
1st Stage 1 Tour de Suisse
4th Gent–Wevelgem
5th Omloop Het Volk
1990
Étoile de Bessèges

1st Stage 2 & 3

1st Stage 5 Tirreno–Adriatico
1st Six Days of Antwerp
2nd Scheldeprijs
3rd Binche–Tournai–Binche
8th Omloop Het Volk
9th Overall Three Days of De Panne
1991
1st Dwars door België
2nd Le Samyn
3rd Milan–San Remo
4th Gent–Wevelgem
5th Amstel Gold Race
1992
1st Stage 17 Vuelta a España
1st GP Wielerrevue
2nd Le Samyn
3rd Omloop Het Volk
3rd E3 Prijs Vlaanderen
1993
1st Overall Three Days of De Panne
1st Stage 3 Étoile de Bessèges
2nd Gent–Wevelgem
3rd Omloop Het Volk
8th Le Samyn
1995
4th Scheldeprijs
6th Paris–Roubaix
1996
3rd Scheldeprijs
