= Cédric Rossier =

Swiss cyclist

Personal information
- Born: 9 February 1957 (age 69) Cugy, Switzerland

Cycling career
- Sport: Cycling
- Role: Rider

Cédric Rossier (born 9 February 1957) is a Swiss former professional racing cyclist. He rode in the 1982 Tour de France.
