= Eddy Planckaert =

Belgian cyclist

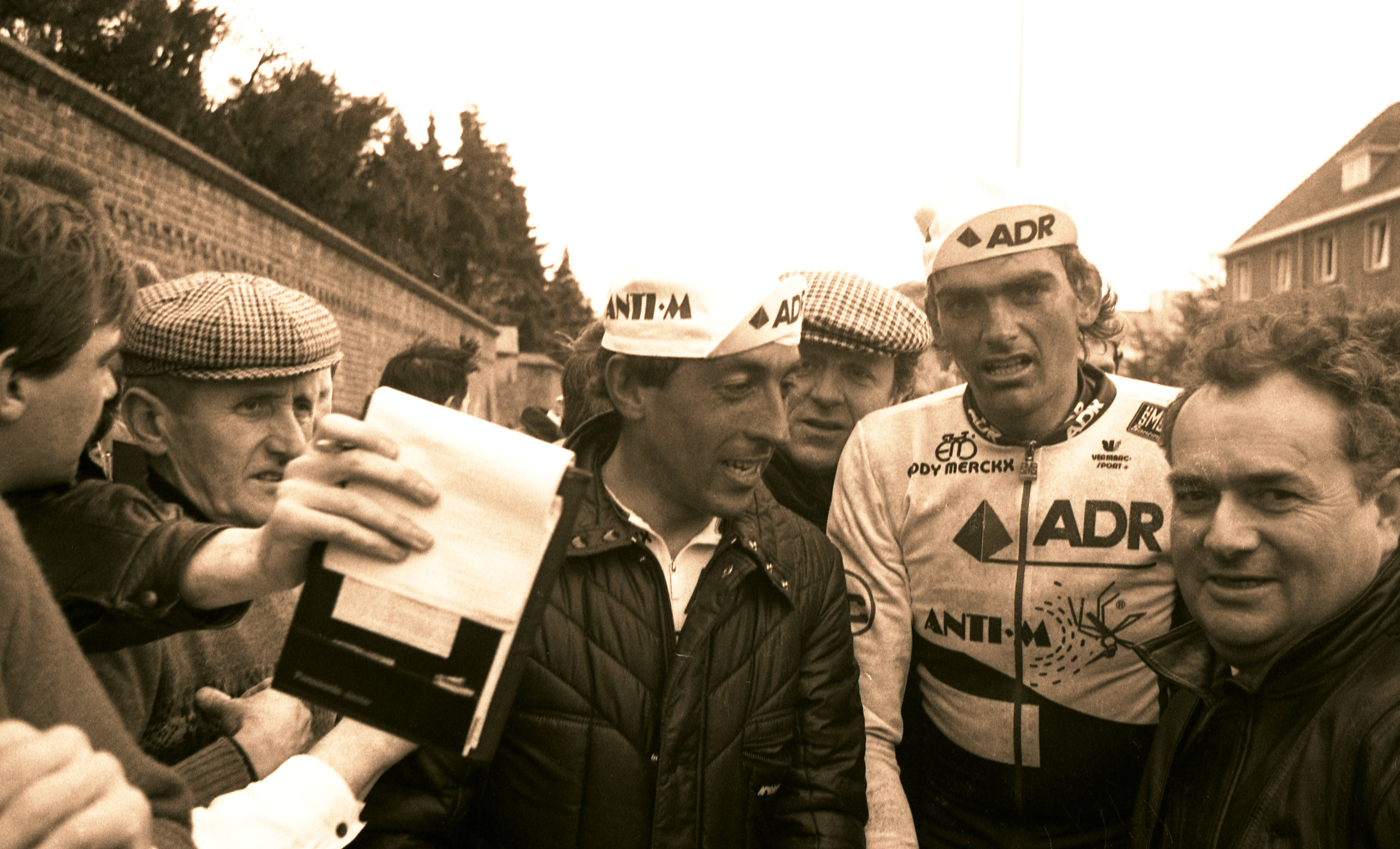
- Planckaert give thanks to Fons De Wolf, Dwars door België 1988 (Maurice Terryn, collection KOERS. Museum van de Wielersport)

Personal information
- Full name: Eddy Planckaert
- Born: 22 September 1958 (age 68) Nevele, Belgium

Cycling career
- Sport: Cycling
- Discipline: Road
- Role: Rider
- Rider type: Sprinter

Professional teams
- 1980: Vermeer Thijs–Mini-Flat
- 1981–1983: Splendor–Wickes Bouwmarkt–Europ Decor
- 1984–1987: Panasonic–Raleigh
- 1988–1989: AD Renting–Mini-Flat–Enerday
- 1990–1991: Panasonic–Sportlife

Major wins
- Grand Tours Tour de France Points classification (1988) 2 individual stages (1981, 1986) Giro d'Italia 1 individual stage (1987) Vuelta a España 10 individual stages (1982, 1985, 1986, 1989) Stage races Tour of Belgium (1984) One-day races and Classics Paris–Roubaix (1990) Tour of Flanders (1988) Omloop Het Volk (1984, 1985) E3 Prijs Vlaanderen (1987, 1989)

Eddy Planckaert (born 22 September 1958) is a Belgian former professional road racing cyclist. In 1988, Planckaert enjoyed perhaps his best year by capturing the green jersey (points competition) at the 1988 Tour de France and winning the Tour of Flanders. In 1990, he won Paris–Roubaix, his second monumental classic, with the closest finish in the race's history beating Canadian Steve Bauer by less than a cm. A strong sprinter, Planckaert is one of the riders with stage wins at all three cycling Grand Tours.

Eddy Planckaert is the brother of fellow cyclists Willy and Walter Planckaert. Eddy is also the uncle of Jo Planckaert and the father of Francesco Planckaert. More than 10 years after his cycling career, the former racer got back into the public eye with a long running reality TV show about his family life, on Vtm.

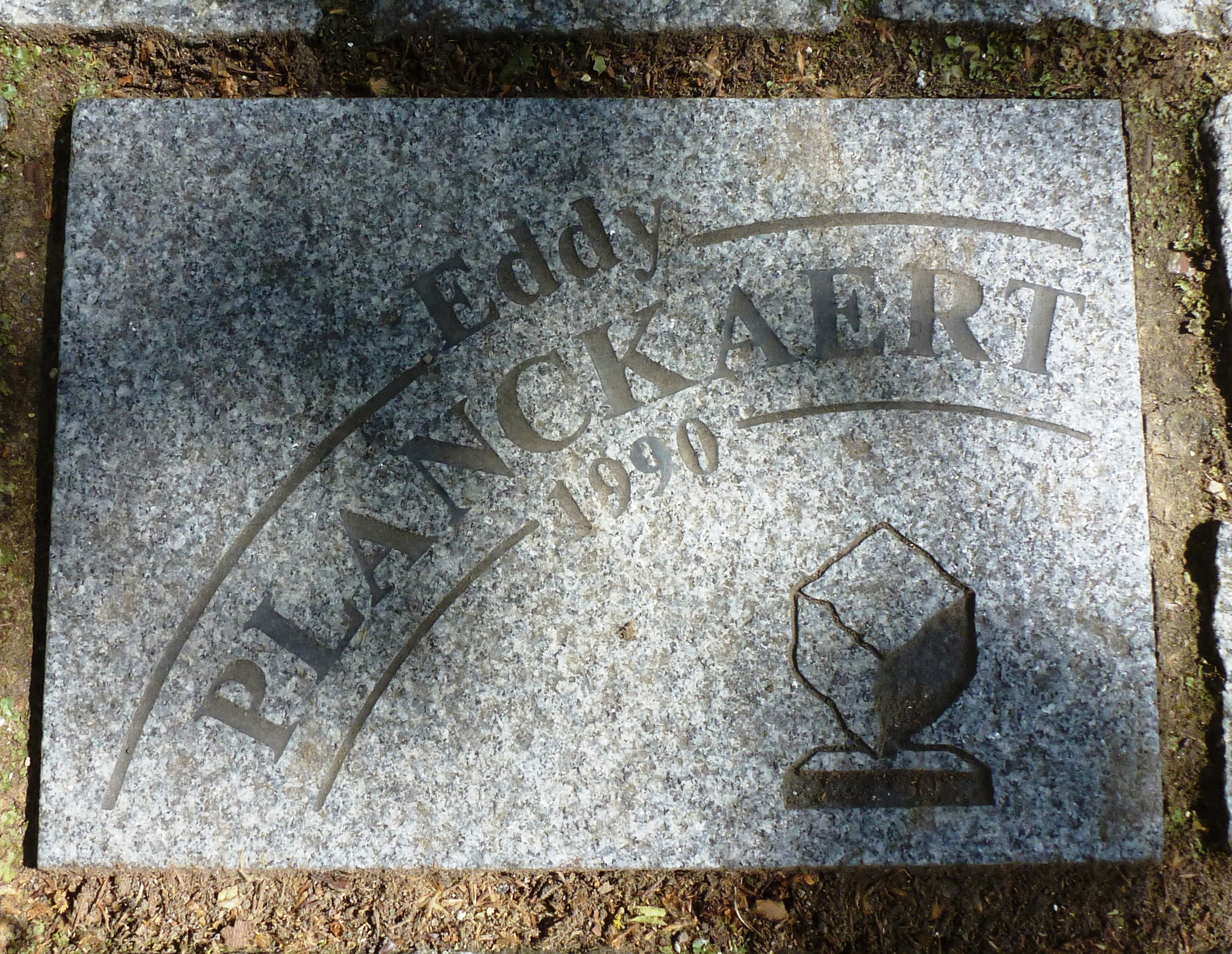
Cobble stone memorizing Planckaert's 1990 win in Paris–Roubaix

After the 2016 Paris–Roubaix, Planckaert declared that second-placed Tom Boonen should have made a deal with eventual winner Mathew Hayman in order to fix the race and let Boonen win.

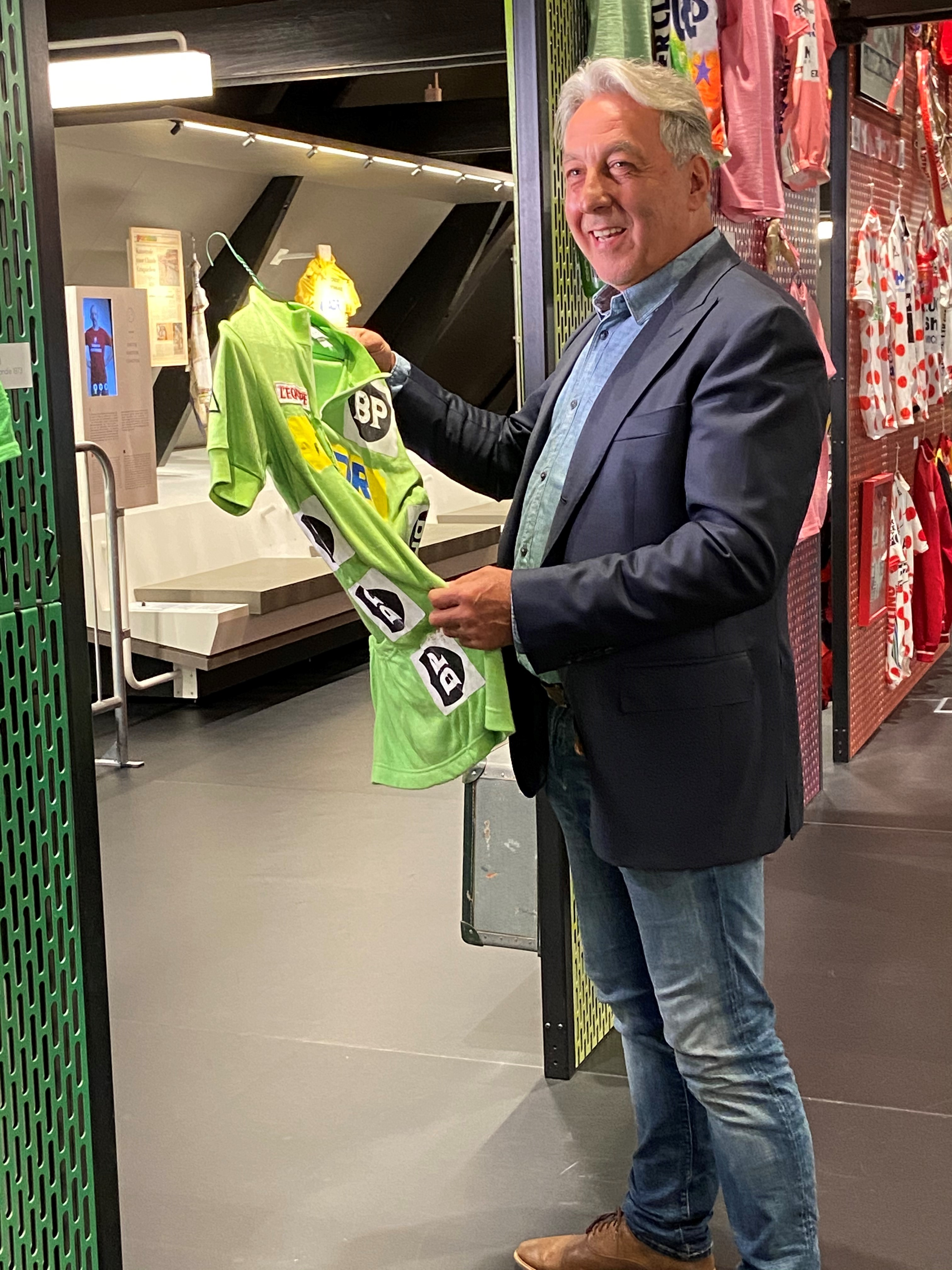
Planckaert holding his green jersey at the KOERS Museum in 2020.

== Major results ==
1974
1st Road race, National Novice Road Championships
1975
1st Road race, National Novice Road Championships
1977
1st Road race, National Junior Road Championships
1978
1st De Vlaamse Pijl
1st Gent–Staden
1979
1st De Vlaamse Pijl
1st Gent–Staden
Tour de Wallonie

1st Stage 2, 3 and 6

1st Kattekoers
1980
1st Omloop der Vlaamse Gewesten
1st Kattekoers
2nd Grand Prix de Waregem
1981
Tour de France

1st Stage 14

1st Omloop Mandel–Leie–Schelde
Three Days of Bruges–De Panne

1st Stage 2

1st Delta Profronde
Tour de Luxembourg

1st Stage 2

2nd Flèche Hesbignonne
1982
Vuelta a España

1st Stages 1a, 1b, 2, 3, and 12

Three Days of Bruges–De Panne

1st Stage 2

Tour of the Basque Country

1st Stages 3 and 5a

2nd Tour of Flanders
2nd Brabantse Pijl
1983
1st Brabantse Pijl
1st Brussels–Ingooigem
Paris–Nice

1st Stage 1

Four Days of Dunkirk

1st Stages 2 and 5b

3rd Kuurne–Brussels–Kuurne
1984
1st Overall Tour of Belgium

1st Stages 2, 4a and 4b

1st Omloop Het Volk
Paris–Nice

1st Stages 1 and 5

1st Grand Prix La Marseillaise
1st Étoile de Bessèges

1st Stages 1, 2a and 3b

Tour de Suisse

1st Stage 8b

Tour Méditerranéen

1st Stages 2, 4a and 4db

Three Days of Bruges–De Panne

1st Stage 2

Four Days of Dunkirk

1st Stage 2

1st GP Marcel Kint
2nd Road race, National Road Championships
2nd E3 Prijs Vlaanderen
1985
1st Omloop Het Volk
Vuelta a España

1st Stages 1 & 4

1st Dwars door Vlaanderen
Paris–Nice

1st Stages 1 & 3

Tour of Belgium

1st Stage 4

Tour of the Netherlands

1st Stage 2

Three Days of Bruges–De Panne

1st Stage 2

Ronde van Nederland

1st Stage 2

1st Acht van Chaam
3rd E3 Prijs Vlaanderen
3rd Delta Profronde
1986
Tour de France

1st Stage 8

Vuelta a España

1st Stages 3 and 7

1st Grand Prix La Marseillaise
Étoile de Bessèges

1st Stage 1

Three Days of Bruges–De Panne

1st Stage 3

Setmana Catalana de Ciclisme

1st Stages 1, 3, 4b and 5

Tour of Belgium

1st Stage 1

2nd Brabantse Pijl
2nd Brussels–Ingooigem
1987
1st E3 Prijs Vlaanderen
Paris–Nice

1st Stage 2

Giro d'Italia

1st Stage 5

Tour Méditerranéen

1st Stages 2 & 3

2nd Grand Prix de Denain
1988
1st Tour of Flanders
Tour de France

1st Points classification

Four Days of Dunkirk

1st Stage 1

2nd Scheldeprijs
3rd E3 Prijs Vlaanderen
1989
1st E3 Prijs Vlaanderen
1st Omloop Mandel-Leie-Schelde
Vuelta a España

1st Stage 5

2nd Road race, National Road Championships
2nd Trofeo Luis Puig
1990
1st Paris–Roubaix
Tirreno–Adriatico

1st Stage 7

Euskal Bizikleta

1st Stage 3

Vuelta a Asturias

1st Stage 6

1st Tour of Limburg
1991
5th Milan San Remo
