= Sean Kelly (cyclist) =

Irish cyclist (born 1956)

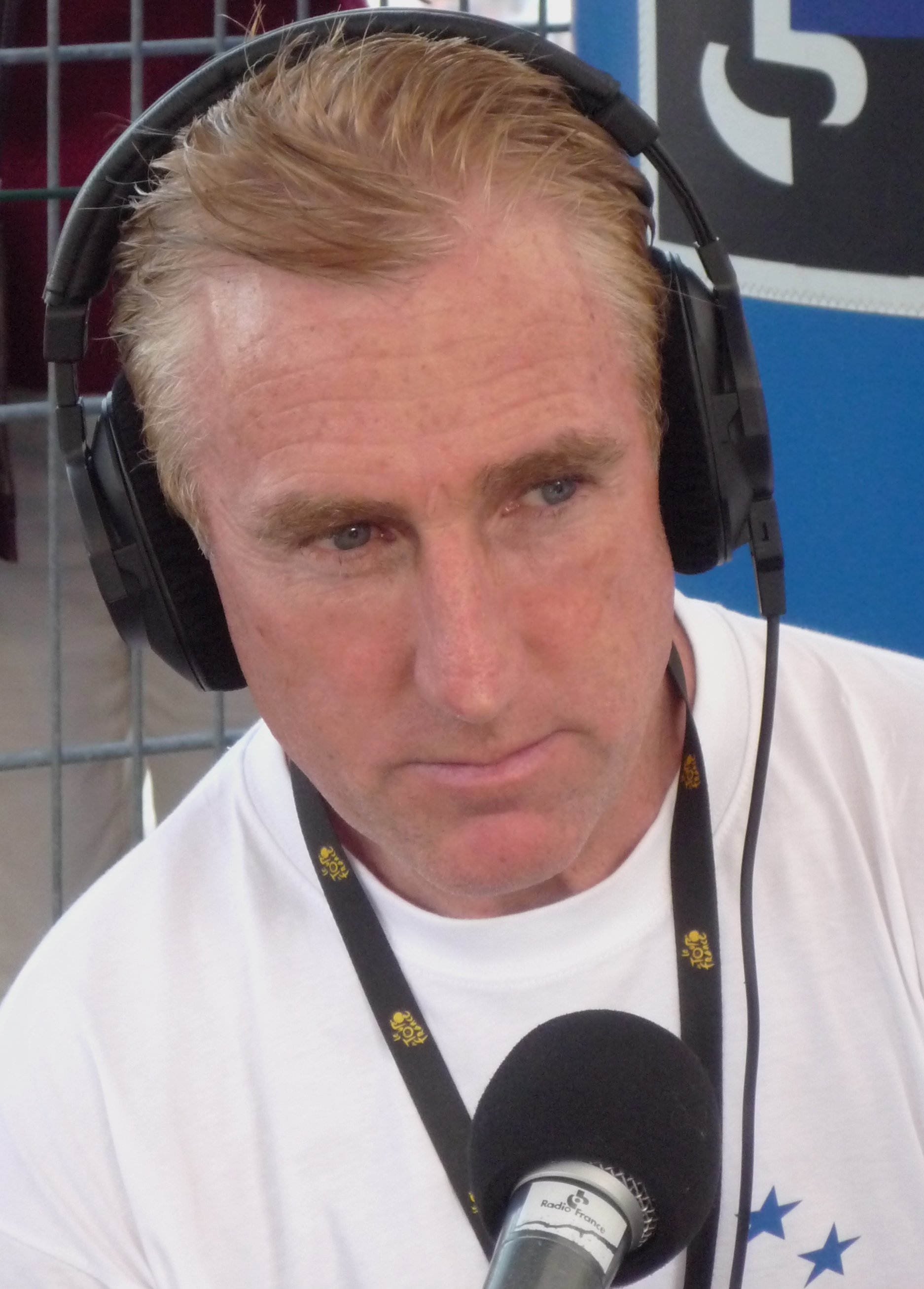
- Kelly in 2009

Personal information
- Full name: John James Kelly
- Nickname: King Kelly
- Born: 24 May 1956 (age 70) Waterford City, County Waterford, Ireland
- Height: 1.80 m (5 ft 11 in)
- Weight: 77 kg (170 lb; 12 st 2 lb)

Cycling career
- Sport: Cycling
- Current team: Retired
- Discipline: Road
- Role: Rider
- Rider type: All-rounder

Amateur team
- 1976: V. C Metz-Woippy

Professional teams
- 1977–1978: Flandria–Velda–Latina Assicurazioni
- 1979–1981: Splendor–Euro Soap
- 1982–1983: Sem–France Loire–Campagnolo
- 1984–1985: Skil–Reydel–Sem–Mavic
- 1986–1988: Kas
- 1989–1991: PDM–Ultima–Concorde
- 1992–1993: Lotus–Festina
- 1994: Catavana–AS Corbeil–Essonnes–Cedico

Major wins
- Grand Tours Tour de France Points classification (1982, 1983, 1985, 1989) Intermediate sprints classification (1982, 1983, 1989) 5 individual stages (1978, 1980, 1981, 1982) Vuelta a España General classification (1988) Points classification (1980, 1985, 1986, 1988) Combination classification (1986, 1988) 16 individual stages (1979, 1980, 1985–1988) Stage races Paris–Nice (1982, 1983, 1984, 1985, 1986, 1987, 1988) Tour de Suisse (1983, 1990) Tour of the Basque Country (1984, 1986, 1987) Volta a Catalunya (1984, 1986) One-day races and Classics Milan–San Remo (1986, 1992) Paris–Roubaix (1984, 1986) Liège–Bastogne–Liège (1984, 1989) Giro di Lombardia (1983, 1985, 1991) Gent–Wevelgem (1988) GP Ouest–France (1984) Paris–Tours (1984) Other Super Prestige Pernod International (1984–1986) UCI Road World Cup (1989)
Medal record
Representing Ireland
Men's road bicycle racing
World Championships
Bronze medal – third place	1982 Goodwood	Elite Men's Road Race
Bronze medal – third place	1989 Chambéry	Elite Men's Road Race

John James 'Sean' Kelly (born 21 May 1956) is an Irish former professional road bicycle racer, one of the most successful road cyclists of the 1980s, and one of the finest Classics riders of all time. From becoming a professional in 1977 until his retirement in 1994, he won 193 professional races, including nine Monument Classics, Paris–Nice a record seven years consecutively and the first UCI Road World Cup in 1989. Kelly won one Grand Tour, the 1988 Vuelta a España, and four green jerseys in the Tour de France. He achieved multiple victories in the Giro di Lombardia, Milan–San Remo, Paris–Roubaix and Liège–Bastogne–Liège, as well as three runners-up placings in the only Monument he failed to win, the Tour of Flanders. Other victories include the Grand Prix des Nations and stage races, the Critérium International, Tour de Suisse, Tour of the Basque Country and Volta a Catalunya.

Kelly twice won bronze medals (1982, 1989) in the Road World Championships Elite Men's Road Race and finished fifth in 1987, the year compatriot Stephen Roche won gold. When the FICP rankings became established in March 1984, Kelly was the first cyclist to be ranked World No.1, a position he held for a record five consecutive years. In the 1984 season, Kelly achieved 33 victories.

== Early life and amateur career ==
Sean Kelly is originally from the Townland of Curraghduff, County Waterford.

Kelly is the second son of Jack (John) and Nellie Kelly, a farming family in Curraghduff, County Waterford. He was born at Belleville Maternity Home in Waterford City on 24 May 1956. He was named John James Kelly after his father and was referred to as "Sean" to avoid confusion at home. Seán is the Irish form of John.

For eight years he was educated at Crehana National School, County Waterford, to which he travelled with his older brother Joe. The journey from home in Curraghduff to Crehana School was approximately a-mile-and-a-half. Together, both he and Sean cycled to and from school. Joe later recollects: "I suppose we were like most young fellows at that age – walking was too dull." Official records from his days at Crehana National School confirm Kelly's satisfactory attendance. At school, he was exceedingly shy, unsure of himself and felt intellectually outclassed by other pupils in his class. As a result, Kelly retreated into almost total silence. His education ended aged only 13 when he left school to help on the farm at home after his father went to a hospital in Waterford with an ulcer. At 16, he began work as a bricklayer.

In September 1969, a delegation from the newly formed Carrick Wheelers Road Club visited the Christian Brothers Secondary School, where Joe was a student. In Joe's classroom, the representatives from the cycling club encouraged the pupils to join a recently formed schoolboy cycling league. Joe was fascinated. He joined the schoolboy league, began winning races, and joined the Carrick Wheelers Road Club as a new member. In the Kelly household, the pattern was for Joe to do something, and Sean would follow in his footsteps. And so it was, from humble beginnings, Sean soon joined Joe. On Tuesday, 4 August 1970, aged 14, Sean competed in his first race at Kennedy Terrace, Carrickbeg, County Tipperary, part of Carrick-on-Suir. The race was an eight-mile (12.87 km) handicap, which meant the weaker riders started first and the best last. Kelly set off three minutes before the backmarkers, which included his brother Joe. He was still three minutes ahead of the pursuers when the course turned for home after four miles (6.43 km) and more than three minutes in the lead when he crossed the finish line. In July 1972, aged 16, he won the National Junior Road Championships at Banbridge, County Down.

Kelly won the National Junior Road Championships again in 1973. He took a senior cycling license in 1974, passing up the opportunity to bid for a third consecutive National Junior Road title. In 1974, aged only 17, two months short of his eighteenth birthday, Kelly won the Shay Elliott Memorial Race. That season he participated in the Tour of Ireland and the Tour of Scotland and achieved ten victories as a senior competitor while still eligible to race as a junior. In 1975, Kelly successfully defended his title, winning the Shay Elliott Memorial Race for the second time. He won three stages of the 1975 Tour of Ireland and the mountains jersey. Kelly won stage 7 of the 1975 Tour of Britain, beating Swede Bernt Johansson and Polish rider Jan Trybala in a three-way sprint. Johansson became Olympic Road Race Champion in Montreal a year later. Kelly's exploits at the 1975 Tour of Britain caught the eye of a Londoner, John Morris, (Note: John Morris was a British enthusiast who acted as a talent scout on behalf of French cycling clubs.) who had connections with amateur Velo Club Metz in Metz, France. Morris informed Metz of Kelly's potential. In August 1975, Alain Steinhoff, a member of the Metz club, travelled to the World Championships in Belgium, where Kelly was competing in the amateur road race. Steinhoff offered Kelly a place on the amateur team V. C Metz-Woippy. Kelly assured Steinhoff that he would consider the offer and promised to contact the club sometime during the following winter. Club Metz heard nothing from Kelly during the winter because his focus of attention shifted to competing in the Rapport Toer stage race in South Africa as preparation for the 1976 Olympic Games.

In late September 1975, Kelly and two other Irish riders, Pat and Kieron McQuaid went to South Africa to participate in the Rapport Toer stage race in preparation for the 1976 Olympic Games in Montreal, Canada. Because of an international ban on athletes competing in South Africa, as a consequence of a protest against apartheid, the three Irish cyclists and two Scottish, John Curran and Henry Wilbraham, competed as a British team under false names. The squad were called "Mum for Men" and managed by Tommy Shardelow. (Note: Tommy Shardelow was a South Africa-based Briton.) When the Irish Cycling Federation received news of their escapades in South Africa, Kelly and the McQuaids incurred a seven-month suspension from racing, reduced after an appeal to six months. Kelly and the McQuaids returned to competitive racing at the end of April 1976.

After resuming racing, Kelly won the Tour of the North in Ulster, Ireland and the Cinturón a Mallorca in Mallorca, Spain. He also won one stage at the 1976 Tour of Britain and one at the 1976 Tour of Ireland. On 29 May 1976, Kelly, Pat and Kieron McQuaid, as a consequence of their participation in the Rapport Toer in South Africa, were barred from the 1976 Olympic Games by the International Olympic Committee. It's misinformation that the ban from the Olympics was for life.

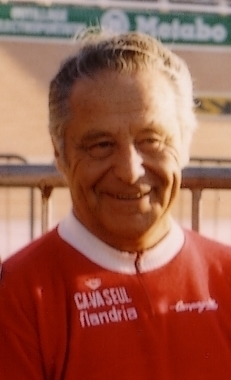
The man who discovered Sean Kelly, Jean de Gribaldy.

With the dream of competing at the 1976 Olympic Games in Montreal now shattered, Kelly suddenly required an alternative plan for the rest of the summer to fill the gut-wrenching void. He cast his mind back to Velo Club Metz's interest in August 1975 and penned a short letter to them asking what they could offer. He received a swift reply, offering free accommodation, £25 per week and free replacements for cycling equipment impaired during races. Kelly accepted the proposition and travelled to Metz in mid-June 1976. Soon after arriving, his motivation grew when he learned Velo Club Metz had an arrangement that a rider would pocket four francs a kilometre for every race won. During the five months he spent with Velo Club Metz, Kelly was victorious in eighteen of the twenty-five races he started, including his most prestigious win, the Piccolo Giro di Lombardia in Italy.

Kelly's time with Velo Club Metz proved lucrative as he returned home to Ireland £800 richer. The money earned made cycling with Metz worthwhile. He told club officials he would return to V.C Metz-Woippy for the 1977 season. Not long after returning home, Kelly contacted Pat McQuaid, asking if he'd be interested in going to Metz with him. McQuaid immediately agreed to go. (Note: Sean Kelly persuaded Velo Club Metz to sign Pat McQuaid for the 1977 season. Kelly had told McQuaid he couldn't go back to France alone for an entire season.) In early November 1976, Velo Club Metz flew Kelly and McQuaid to London. Metz sent a delegate to meet them there. With the assistance of the club representative and Londoner John Morris, proposals were accepted, which would cover the two Irish amateurs in Metz for the 1977 season. The bonus scheme offered was substantially better than what Kelly had acquired in his first season with Metz.

During Kelly's stint with Velo Club Metz in the 1976 season, an impressive stage win at the Tour de Haute-Marne in Northeastern France caught the attention of Jean-Pierre Douçot. Douçot, a former amateur cyclist, was a mechanic and talent scout in eastern France. Jean-Pierre informed Jean de Gribaldy, a directeur sportif from Besançon who was putting together a French squad for the Belgian professional team, Flandria–Velda–Latina Assicurazioni, of Kelly's potential. Later, Kelly's win at the end of the season on 2 October 1976 in the Piccolo Giro di Lombardia left an indelible impression, which convinced de Gribaldy to act upon Douçot's earlier recommendation.

On 9 December 1976, a private jet was flown from Dole Airport, near Besançon and landed at Dublin Airport. Onboard was directeur sportif Jean de Gribaldy, pilot Bernard Dagot and a youthful French amateur cyclist, Noël Converset. Dagot, Chief Air Traffic Controller at Dole Airport, spoke fluent English and his language skills earned him the role of interpreter. Converset, Kelly's teammate at Metz, was taken to Ireland to identify Kelly and assist in the recruitment process. The three Frenchmen hired a taxi in Dublin to take them to Carrick-on-Suir. Upon arrival in Carrick-on-Suir, they were given directions to Kelly's home in rural Curraghduff. Arriving unexpectedly, Jack and Nellie Kelly greeted them. Sean, who wasn't at home, was out driving a tractor. The trio decided to drive out the Dungarvan road in the hope that they would discover Kelly on his trip back home in the tractor. Soon they encountered a tractor, driven by a young man, travelling towards them. De Gribaldy asked Converset, "Is that Kelly?" to which the uncertain Converset (Note: De Gribaldy signed Noël Converset to ride with the Flandria team for the 1977 season.) hesitantly answered. De Gribaldy ordered the driver to bring the taxi to a halt. Dagot emerged from the taxi hailing the tractor and asked the driver, "Are you Sean Kelly?" to which the response was, "Yes, I am Sean Kelly." Both parties agreed to go to Kelly's home in Curraghduff for negotiations. De Gribaldy offered Kelly an annual salary of £4000, which Kelly declined. Kelly consulted Pat McQuaid and Ireland's cycling team manager John Lackey for advice. A week later, de Gribaldy telephoned Kelly, at home in Ireland from Besançon. Kelly successfully negotiated a deal, asking for £6000 in the process, which Gribaldy agreed to. Kelly now had a professional contract with Flandria. Pat's brother Oliver replaced Kelly at Velo Club Metz.

Kelly travelled to France in late January 1977 and lived for two years at 18, Place de la Révolution (formerly, Place du Marché) in Besançon, de Gribaldy's home town. The apartment was above a bike shop owned by de Gribaldy. He shared with four teammates, Noël Converset, Marcel Tinazzi, René Bittinger and Dominique Sanders.

== Professional career ==
=== Early years ===
Flandria were a Belgian cycling team sponsored by a Belgian company Flandria, which manufactured bicycles, mopeds and scooters. Guillaume Driessens was the directeur sportif of the Flandria team, one of the world's best, with riders such as Freddy Maertens, Marc Demeyer and Michel Pollentier among their ranks. Flandria required a French squad to expand its commercial interests in France, so they hired Jean de Gribaldy to assemble and direct a new team. The French squad competed predominantly in smaller French races. The Belgian team based in Belgium contained the strongest and most experienced riders. Good performances meant promotion from de Gribaldy's French squad to the Belgian team.

On 7 February 1977, Kelly participated in his first race as a professional competitor, the first stage of the six-day stage race Étoile de Bessèges. He made an impressive debut, finishing tenth in the opening stage and third in the final overall general classification. On 19 February 1977, in the first stage of the Tour Méditerranéen, Kelly was denied his first professional victory. Without the benefit of a photo-finish, the judge at the finish line deemed Jan Raas the winner in a sprint finish, with Kelly given second place. Several years later, a photographer who had captured a photo at the finish line that day met Kelly in southern France, showing him the image which provided emphatic evidence that Kelly was the winner of the stage.

"Some people can do business on the committee system; others find that life is only fun when you are running the show. In Kelly's case it was to mean working for the collection of underpaid has-beens that de Gribaldy habitually assembled. But a smaller, less pretentious team can have its advantages for a rider of Kelly's sort. When you don't have to compete for a team's loyalty you can concentrate on winning races, and that's exactly what Kelly proceeded to do."

— Robin Magowan, Kings of the Road: A Portrait of Racers and Racing.

On 6 March 1977, in a six-man sprint finish, Kelly recorded his first win as a professional, the pro–am Grand Prix de Lugano in Switzerland. Kelly's early impressive displays caught the attention of Guillaume Driessens and the Belgian Flandria squad, resulting in Kelly being promoted and selected to compete with their team at the 1977 Paris–Nice as a domestique for Freddy Maertens. Maertens won the opening prologue and defended his leader's jersey throughout the entire race winning overall.

On 19 March 1977, Kelly participated in his first Monument Classic, the Milan–San Remo. On 11 May 1977, competing with the French squad, Kelly won the first stage of the Tour de Romandie in Switzerland and finished tenth overall in the final general classification. On 25 May 1977, Kelly won the French one-day race Circuit de l'Indre, outsprinting Eddy Merckx into second place. In October 1977, Kelly recorded his fourth win of the season, outsprinting Frenchman Serge Périn in the fourth stage of the Étoile des Espoirs.

Kelly stayed with de Gribaldy for 1978. In 1978, he started in the Tour de France, in which he also won a stage. Michel Pollentier was disqualified from the 1978 Tour de France after cheating a drugs test on the afternoon that he took the race lead. He left the team at the end of the season and started his own, with a new backer, Splendor. Both Maertens and Pollentier wanted Kelly. Pollentier and Splendor offered Kelly more and made him a team leader. Kelly and Pollentier often shared hotel rooms. But Splendor was new and logistic problems became obvious. The bikes were in poor state – enough that Splendor decided not to ride Paris–Roubaix – and the manager, Robert Lauwers, was replaced. Kelly rose above it and rode for himself.

=== Stage successes ===
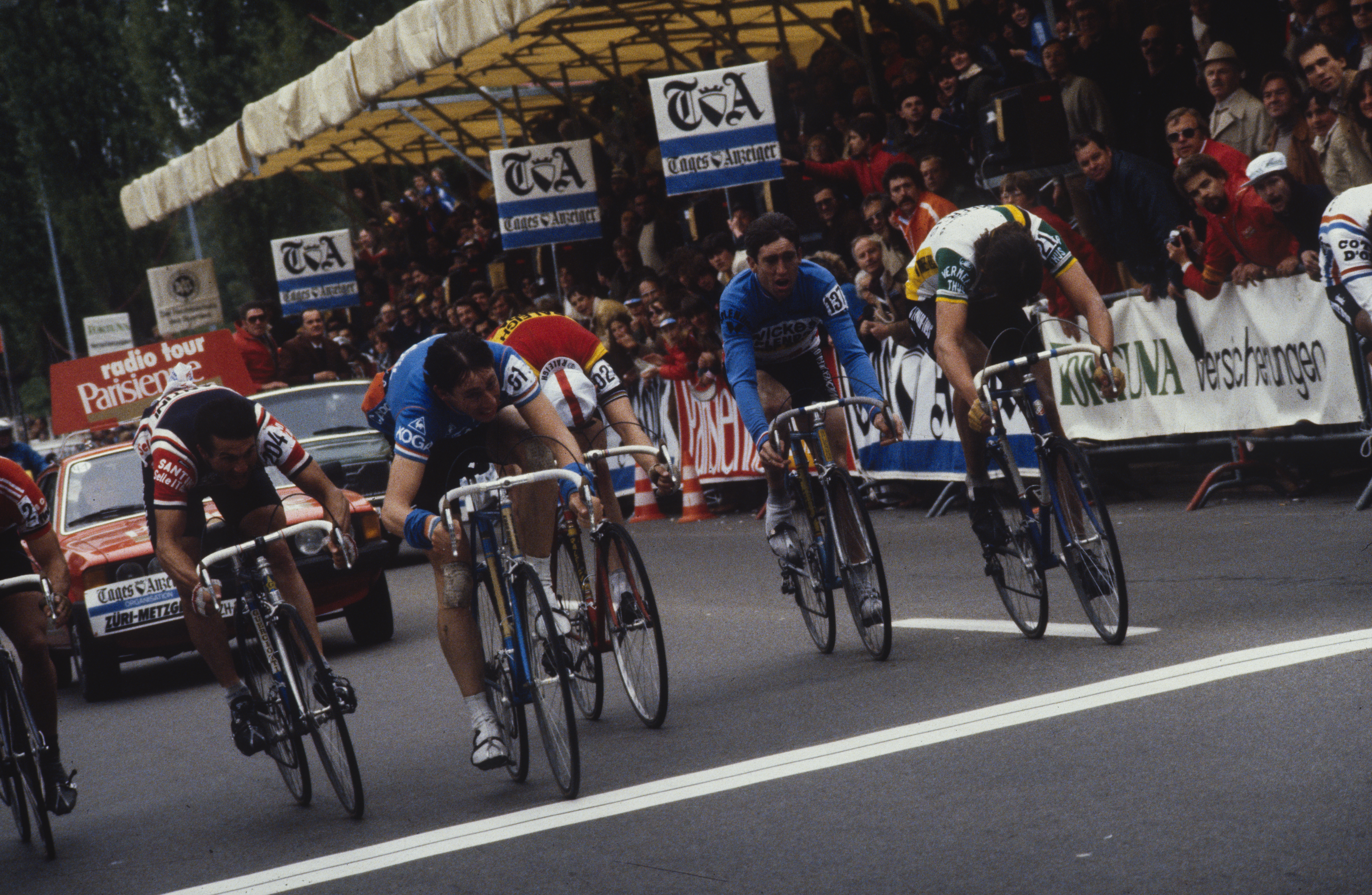
Sean Kelly, second from right, showing his sprinting prowess at the 1981 Züri-Metzgete.

By now Kelly had a reputation as a sprinter who could not win stage races, although he did finish fourth in the 1980 Vuelta a España. De Gribaldy employed him as unambiguous team leader, someone he believed could win stage races and not just stages. To this end, de Gribaldy encouraged Kelly to lose weight, convincing the latter that he could target the overall win at Paris–Nice: Kelly won the "Race to the Sun" and four of its stages. On the last of those, a time-trial to the Col d'Èze, he beat Gilbert Duclos-Lassalle and pushed him out of the lead. Years later Kelly admitted that his countryman Roche's emergence during his neo-pro season in 1981, during which he had also won Paris–Nice, was one of the factors which motivated him to adjust his focus to becoming more of an all-round rider. However, the spring classics season proved a disappointment, with Kelly's best result being a 12th place in Paris–Roubaix after suffering multiple punctures. Despite that, that season he went on to win another of objectives set by de Gribaldy: the points classification of the Tour de France, where he took five second places on flat stages before winning a reduced bunch sprint in Pau after climbing the Col d'Aubisque. His points total was nearly three times that of the points classification runner-up, the yellow jersey winner Bernard Hinault. He won bronze in the 1982 Road World Championships Elite Men's Road Race in Goodwood, West Sussex, England, the first world medal for an Irish rider since Shay Elliott's silver in 1962. At the end of the year, Kelly married his girlfriend, Linda Grant, the daughter of a local cycling club official. Carrick-on-Suir named the town square "Sean Kelly Square" in tribute to his achievements in the 1982 Tour de France and his bronze medal at the 1982 World Championships. The following year, 1983, Kelly won Paris–Nice for the second time, the first of three Critérium International victories, his first Tour de Suisse and the points classification in the Tour de France for the second consecutive year. Kelly wore the yellow jersey in the 1983 Tour de France for one day, during the mountainous stage 10 from Pau to Bagnères-de-Luchon, which included the Pyrenean climbs, the Aubisque, Tourmalet, Aspin and Peyresourde. It was the only time he would wear the maillot jaune (English: yellow jersey) at the Tour.

Kelly confirmed his potential in autumn 1983. A leading group of 18 entered Como in the Giro di Lombardia after a battle over the Intelvi and Schignano passes. Kelly won the sprint to take his first Monument by the narrowest margin, less than half a wheel separating the first four, against cycling greats including Francesco Moser, Adri van der Poel, Hennie Kuiper and World Champion Greg LeMond.

Kelly dominated the following spring. He won Paris–Nice for the third successive time beating Roche as well as the Tour de France winner, Bernard Hinault who was returning after a knee injury. Kelly finished second in Milan–San Remo and the Tour of Flanders, but was unbeatable in Paris–Roubaix and Liège–Bastogne–Liège. The day after Paris–Roubaix, the French daily sports paper, L'Équipe, pictured Kelly cycling the cobbles with mud on his face and had the heading Insatiable Kelly! referring to his appetite for winning that spring. He won all three stages in the Critérium International: the bunch sprint on stage 1, a solo victory in the mountain stage and beating Roche in the final time trial. Kelly achieved 33 victories in 1984. He was becoming a contender in the Grand Tours, as seen by finishing fifth in the Tour de France. This may have caused him to lose his grip on the points classification in that year's Tour. Kelly was wearing it as the Tour was finishing on the Champs-Élysées but lost it in the bunch finish to the Belgian, Frank Hoste, who finished ahead of Kelly gaining points to take the jersey off Kelly's shoulders.

He won Paris–Nice in 1985, again beating Roche. He also took three stage wins at the Vuelta a España, but suffered a frustrating spring classics season, taking a third place at Paris–Roubaix and fourth at Liège–Bastogne–Liège, but losing out on wins through poor tactical decisions, such as at Milan–San Remo where he and rival Eric Vanderaerden marked each other out of contention. He won the points classification for the third time and finished fourth overall in the 1985 Tour de France, where his rivalry with Vanderaerden boiled over at the finish of the sixth stage in Reims: the latter veered to prevent Kelly from coming past in the final sprint, leading Kelly to push Vanderarden, and the Belgian pulling the Irishman's jersey in response. The race saw him battle for the last step on the GC podium with Stephen Roche: although Roche finished the Tour in third position overall, the duo's performances saw interest in the race expanding gradually in the Irish press. Kelly won the first Nissan International Classic beating Adri van der Poel. At the end of the season, he won the Giro di Lombardia.

"On his best form there is nothing you can do against Kelly: he climbs better than the best climbers and sprints better than the best sprinters."

— Greg LeMond offered this assessment of Sean Kelly in 1986.

He won Milan–San Remo in 1986 after winning Paris–Nice. In Milan–San Remo, Kelly was being marked closely by Vanderaerden in the closing stages of the race. Mario Beccia attacked on the race's final climb of the Poggio di San Remo and was followed by Greg LeMond. In order to shake Vanderaerden, Kelly feigned a mechanical problem before sprinting away to join the lead group, and drove hard on the front to prevent Niki Rüttimann, LeMond's team-mate, who had followed Kelly, from linking up with the front group: Kelly won the three-up sprint at the finish. He also took stage wins at the Volta a la Comunitat Valenciana, Critérium International and Three Days of De Panne. He finished second in the Tour of Flanders and won Paris–Roubaix again. According to his autobiography Hunger, Kelly gave his support to Van der Poel in the latter's bid to win Flanders in exchange for the Dutchman's help in the French cobbled Classic. In Flanders, Kelly rode on the front of the leading four man group in the closing stages of the race, which also included Van der Poel, Jean-Philippe Vandenbrande and Steve Bauer: regarding the final sprint, Kelly wrote that "I started my sprint early, and I knew Van der Poel was probably in my wheel as well, but I certainly gave it 100 percent." After Flanders, he flew to Spain to race the Tour of the Basque Country, which he won, before flying north to compete in Paris–Roubaix. Roles were reversed as Kelly followed Van der Poel in latching onto an attack from Ferdi Van Den Haute on a late cobbled secteur to form another four-man group along with Rudy Dhaenens. Van Den Haute attacked again a kilometre from the race finish – which was located away from Roubaix Velodrome for the first time since 1943 – and once again Van der Poel led Kelly out in the sprint, enabling the latter to cross the line first. To date, Kelly is one of only four riders to win the double of Milan–San Remo and Paris–Roubaix in the same year, along with Cyrille van Hauwaert in 1908, John Degenkolb in 2015 and Mathieu van der Poel in 2023 and 2025. Kelly was engaged in an intense racing schedule, even by contemporary standards, having competed 34 times from the beginning of the season to 1986. He later explained this as partly due to the influence of Jean de Gribaldy, who reasoned that he might as well race if he was going to have to train on his bike if he didn't compete, and because of new sponsor Kas, a Spanish soft drink manufacturer, who were primarily concerned with success in Spain, and uninterested in winning the Classics, meaning Kelly had to compete in both types of races. He finished on a podium in a Grand Tour for the first time when he finished third in the 1986 Vuelta a España, winning two stages along the way. As a result of serious injuries sustained in a crash during the final stage of the 1986 Tour de Suisse, in which he went over a wall on a descent, Kelly missed the 1986 Tour de France. He returned to Ireland and won the Nissan Classic again. His second win in the Nissan came after a duel with Steve Bauer, who took the yellow jersey after Kelly crashed numerous times. Kelly went into the final stage three seconds behind Bauer and took the jersey when he finished third on the stage and won bonus seconds. Kelly took more than 30 victories in total across the 1986 season.

Kelly won Paris–Nice in 1987 on the last day after Roche, the leader, punctured. Later, leading the Vuelta a España with three days to go, he retired with an extremely painful saddle sore. His bad luck continued in the Tour de France, retiring after fracturing his collarbone in a crash. After the 1987 Road World Championships Elite Men's Road Race, in which he finished fifth behind Roche, Kelly returned to Ireland to win the Nissan Classic for the third consecutive time.

Kelly won his seventh consecutive Paris–Nice in the spring of 1988, a record. He won Gent–Wevelgem several weeks later.

=== Grand Tour success ===
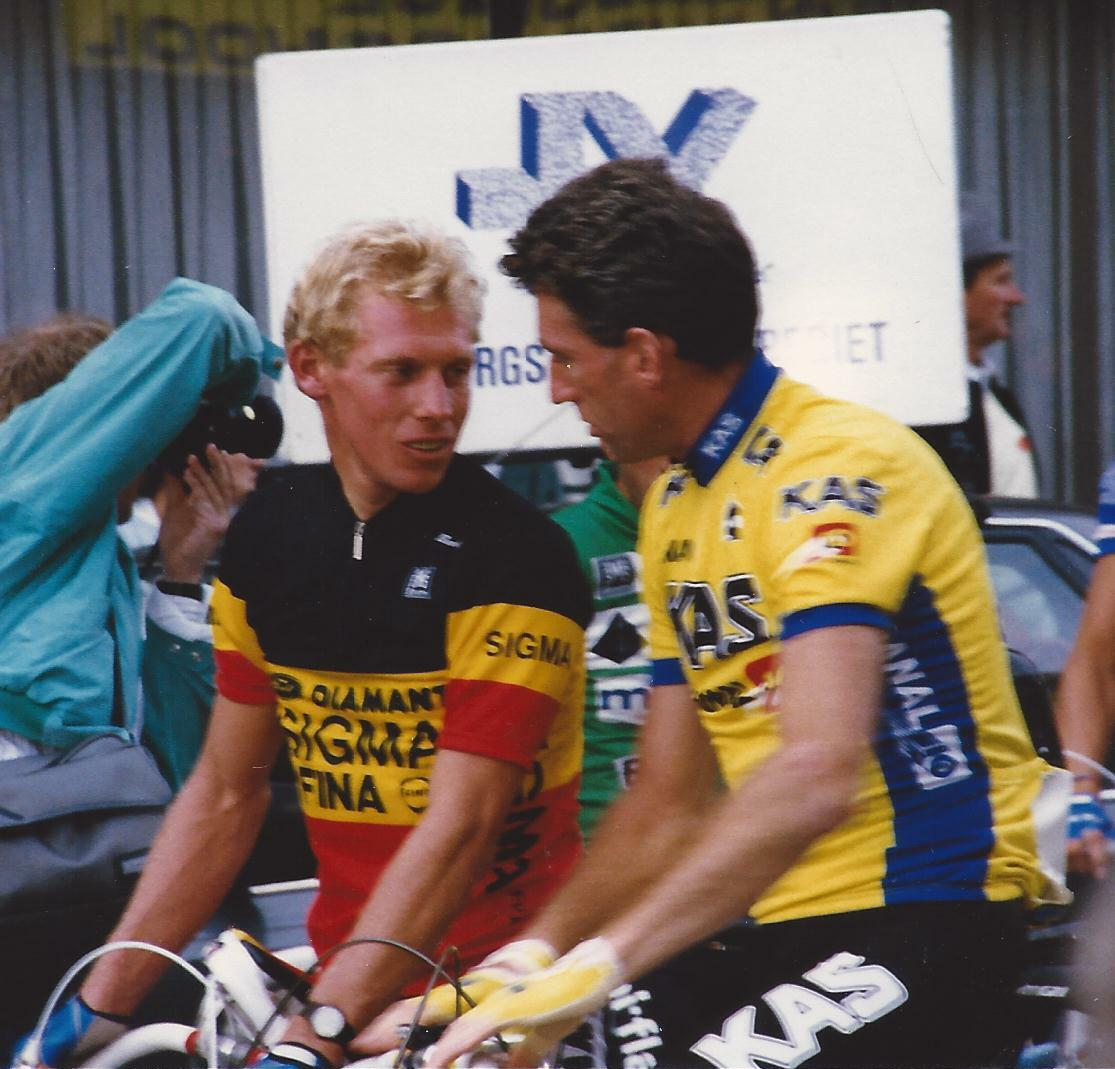
Kelly (right) with Etienne De Wilde in 1988.

Kelly returned in April to the 1988 Vuelta a España which started on the rugged mountainous island of Tenerife where his team struggled in the second stage, losing the influential rider Thomas Wegmüller to dysentery and losing further time in the time-trial around Las Palmas. However, on the Spanish mainland, Kelly concentrated on winning sprint time bonuses, battling with sprinter Manuel Jorge Domínguez, the BH teammate of leader, Laudelino Cubino.

After regaining a minute in four days, the race reached the mountains where Kelly relied on help from Robert Millar of team Fagor–MBK to stay within two minutes of Cubino after the mountain trial to Alto Oviedo. He then finished fourth behind stage-winner Fabio Parra and Anselmo Fuerte on stage 13 to the ski-station at Cerler, cutting a minute and a half into Cubino's lead. From this stage, Fuerte had moved into second overall and later took the jersey from Cubino on the 16th stage to Albacete when the leader got caught on the wrong side of a split caused by cross-winds.

Kelly maintained the gap between himself and Fuerte and started the time trial on the second last day 21 seconds behind. Confident that he could overhaul the leader, he "put it in a big gear and gave it everything." He took the leader's "maillot amarillo" (yellow jersey), beating Fuerte by almost two minutes. The following day Kelly won his only Grand Tour, over West German Raimund Dietzen and also won the points competition. After his Vuelta win Kelly returned to Carrick-on-Suir where a parade was held in his honour.

=== Twilight of his career ===
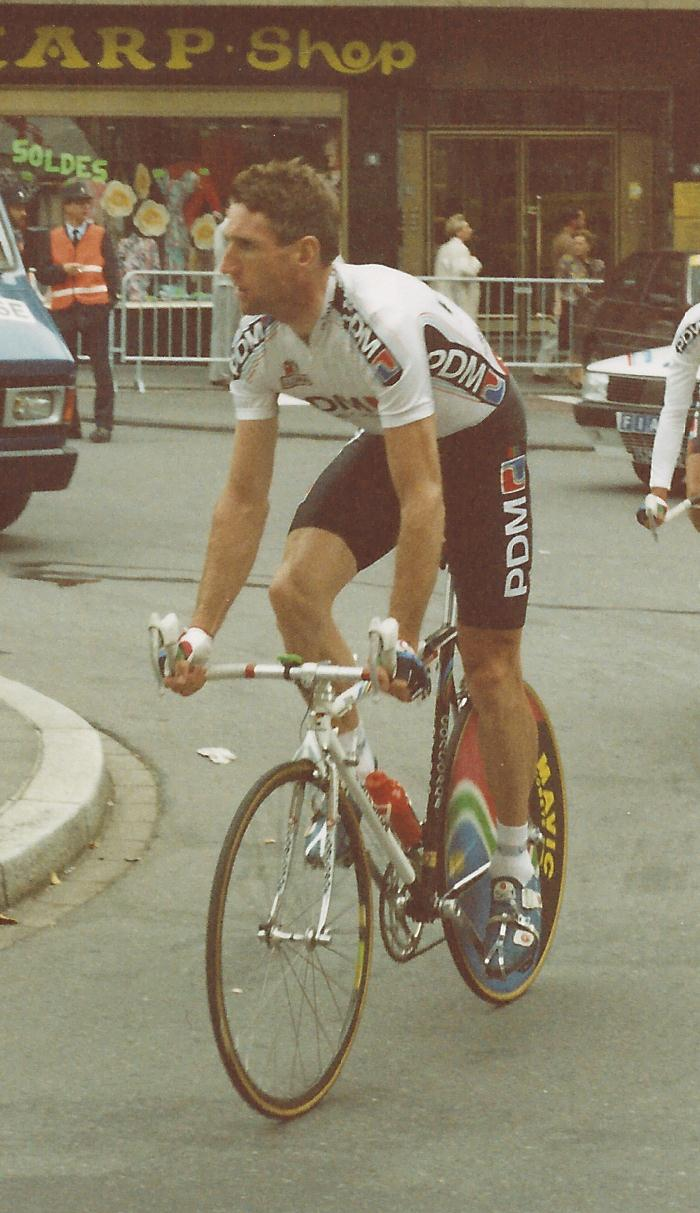
Sean Kelly with PDM–Ultima–Concorde at the 1989 Tour de France.

Kelly finished 46th overall in the 1988 Tour de France, just over an hour behind winner, Spaniard Pedro Delgado, and later admitted he was no longer a contender for overall victory. He finished third behind the German, Rolf Gölz, in the 1988 Nissan Classic. In 1989, Kelly switched to the Dutch PDM–Ultima–Concorde team and stayed there for three years until the end of the 1991 season. He achieved his first major victory with PDM in 1989, winning the Liège–Bastogne–Liège for the second time. The same year he won the points classification in the Tour de France for the fourth time and the inaugural UCI Road World Cup championship. He won bronze in the sprint finish at the rainy 1989 Road World Championships Elite Men's Road Race in Chambéry, France behind Dimitri Konyshev and winner Greg LeMond.

Kelly won the Tour de Suisse in 1990 for the second time. In March 1991, while competing in the Paris–Nice, he broke his right collarbone. During the 1991 Tour de France, the entire PDM team, including Kelly, abandoned the race, citing illness, which later became known as the "Intralipid Affair." In August 1991, Kelly abandoned his racing schedule to participate in the Tour of Galicia after his brother Joe was tragically killed in the Comeragh 100 near Carrick-on-Suir, County Tipperary. He came back to win his fourth Nissan Classic by four seconds over Sean Yates and went on to win the Giro di Lombardia at the end of the season.

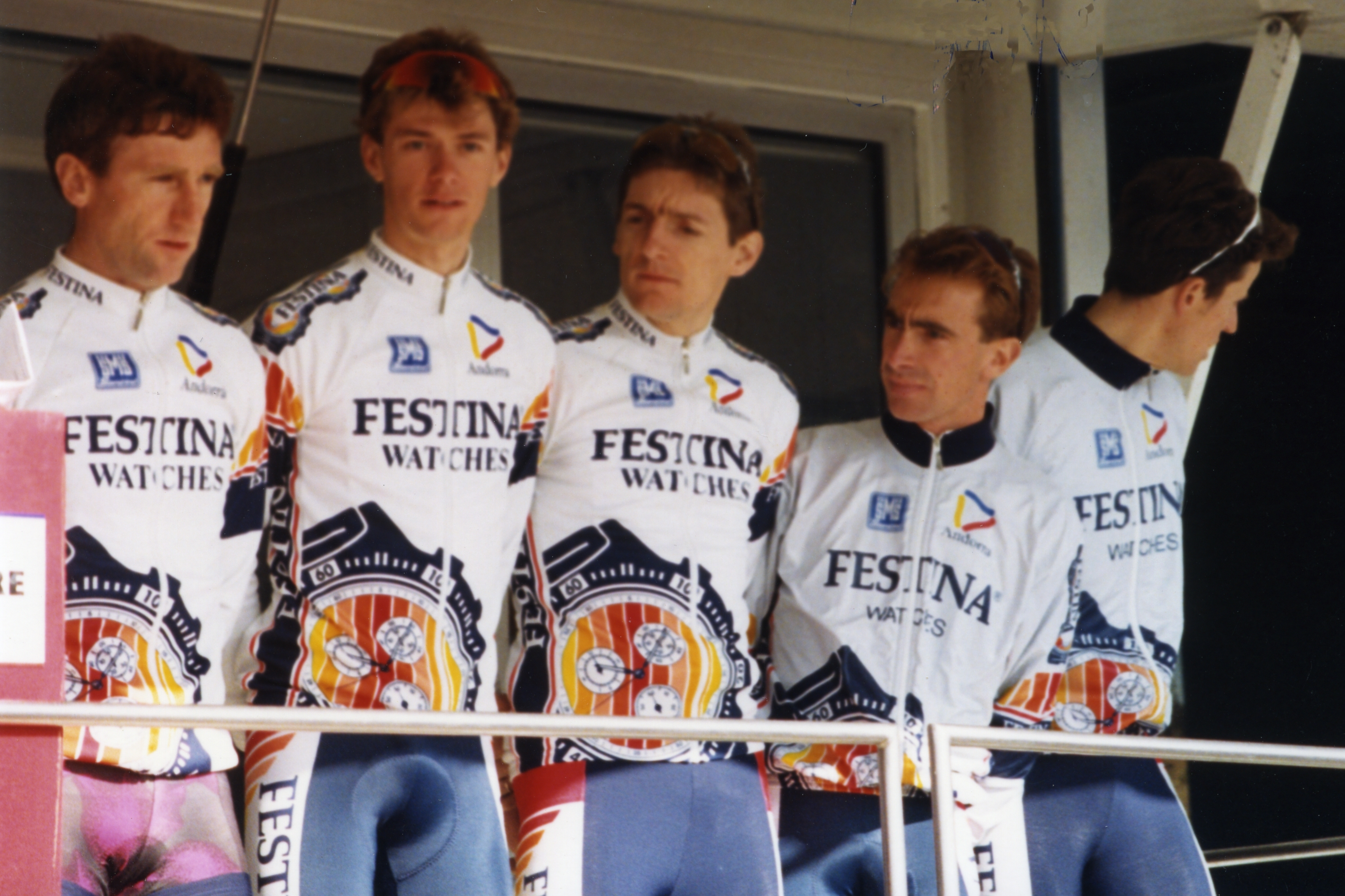
Kelly (left) with the Festina–Lotus team at the 1993 Paris–Nice.

Kelly won the Giro di Lombardia for a third time in 1991 but started 1992 regarded as past his prime. He moved to Lotus–Festina in 1992 and prepared for Milan–San Remo. Race favourite Moreno Argentin attacked from the leading group on the final climb, the Poggio. He broke clear after several attempts and reached the top eight seconds before the rest. It seemed he was on his way to a solo victory as the peloton descended the Poggio, where Maurizio Fondriest led, marked by Argentin's teammate Rolf Sørensen. Kelly was behind these two in third position. Kelly attacked with three kilometres of descending left. Sorensen could not hold his acceleration and Kelly got away. He caught Argentin with a kilometre to go. Both stalled, the chasers closing fast, Argentin gesturing to Kelly to take the front. Kelly stayed on Argentin's wheel. The two moved again, preparing for a sprint; Kelly launched himself and in the final 200m came past Argentin to win his final Classic.

Kelly's first appearance and sole participation in the Giro d'Italia was in 1992. His team, Lotus–Festina, was offered a wild card entry under the condition that Kelly was included in their starting team. He pulled out of the race after stage 16 from Palazzolo sull’Oglio to Sondrio, later admitting his intention of not completing the Giro and his agreement with his directeur sportif that he would withdraw at some stage.

In 1992, Kelly travelled to Colombia for the Clásico RCN, where he won the second stage. His former PDM teammate, Martin Earley, pushed him into second place at the 1994 Irish National Road Championships. (Note: The inaugural Irish National Professional Road Championships transpired on 26 June 1994 on the Isle of Man, during the Manx International, which merged with the British National Championships. Competing in the same peloton as the British cyclists were Sean Kelly, Martin Earley and Joe Barr, of which the best-placed would become the first-ever Irish National Professional Road Champion. Earley was crowned champion, with Kelly second and Barr taking third.)

Kelly's last year as a professional was 1994, when he rode for Catavana. He returned to Carrick-on-Suir at the end of the season to ride the annual Hamper race. That was Kelly's last race as a professional. Eddy Merckx, Laurent Fignon, Bernard Hinault, Roger De Vlaeminck, Claude Criquielion, Stephen Roche, Martin Earley, Acácio da Silva and Paul Kimmage were among 1,200 cyclists present. The President of Ireland, Mary Robinson, attended a civic presentation to Kelly the day before the race. Kelly won in a sprint against Roche. Kelly won this race again six years later.

== Legacy and riding style ==
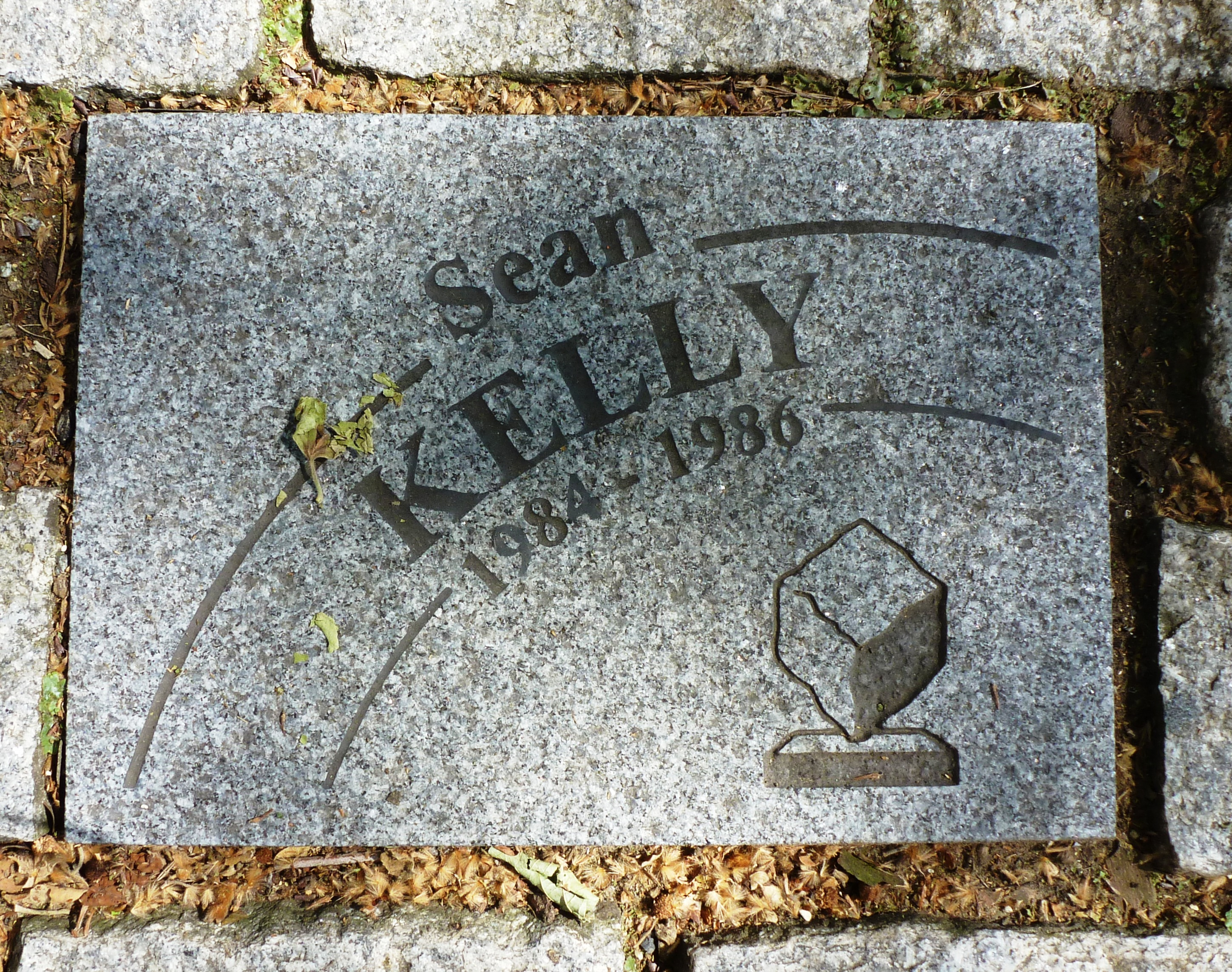
Plaque on the cobbled section, Espace Charles Crupelandt of the Paris–Roubaix, honouring Kelly's victories in 1984 and 1986.

Kelly's career spanned the eras of several legends of the Tour de France, from Eddy Merckx through to Miguel Induráin. His first Tour was also the first for Bernard Hinault and the two battled in the sprint of stage 15. Greg LeMond and Laurent Fignon emerged in the early eighties and challenged Kelly in the Classics as well as in the Tour, and Kelly witnessed the rise of Miguel Induráin and the early career of Lance Armstrong. Kelly's career coincided with Stephen Roche as well as Classics specialists including Francesco Moser, Claude Criquielion, Moreno Argentin and Eric Vanderaerden. Evidence of Kelly's dominance can be seen from his three victories in the season-long Super Prestige Pernod International competition (predecessor to the World Cup). Kelly competed throughout the season, from Paris–Nice in March to the Giro di Lombardia in October, winning both in 1983 and 1985.

"It is customary to talk of Kelly as quintessentially an Irish rider. For my part, though, I think it helps to place Kelly better as a cyclist to see him as the last of the Flemish riders. This is usually a title associated with the post-war rider, Briek Schotte who has become appropriately enough the man in day-to-day charge of the de Gribaldy teams. As exemplified by Schotte it stood for a certain type of mentality, willing to suffer, narrowly focussed, and hard, hard, hard. Kelly had all this in him from his Irish small-farm background: the outside loo; the dogs that have to be chained before you can step from your car; the one career possible, as a bricklayer on a construction site, stretching away and away into the grey mists. On the positive side, along with the self-reliance, came a physical strength that even by peasant standards is impressive. In a profession of iron wills, there is no one harder."

— Robin Magowan, Kings of the Road: A Portrait of Racers and Racing.

While some sprinters remain sheltered in the peloton until the final few hundred metres, Kelly could instigate breaks and climb well, proving this by winning the Vuelta a España in 1988, as well as winning a stage of Paris–Nice on the climb of Mont Ventoux. His victories in Paris–Roubaix (1984, 1986) showed his ability in poor weather and on pavé sections, while he could stay with the climbing specialists in the mountains in the Tour de France. He was also a formidable descender, clocking a career top race speed of 124 km/h (77 mi/h), while descending from Col de Joux Plane to Morzine on stage 19 of the Tour in 1984. He finished fourth in the Tour in 1985 and won the points classification in 1982, 1983, 1985, and 1989, the first to win four times, a feat he repeated in the Vuelta a España. Kelly won five stages in the Tour de France and 16 in the Vuelta a España.

Kelly was also an outstanding time trialist. In the inaugural 1985 Nissan Classic, Kelly, wearing a skinsuit, racing a Vitus Plus Carbone road bike with drop handlebars and a rear MAVIC disc wheel, produced a magnificent performance in the stage 3a, 21 km (13.04 mi) individual time trial from Carrick-on-Suir to Clonmel. His winning time of 24:09 was 49 seconds quicker than second-placed Stephen Roche. Kelly's winning average speed of 52.173 km/h (32.419 mi/h) was faster than any individual had ever accomplished in a time trial, further than 20 km. It took another four years to surpass this record when American Greg LeMond averaged 54.545 km/h (33.893 mi/h) in the historical 24.5 km (15.22 mi) individual time trial from Versailles to Paris at the 1989 Tour de France.

== Doping ==
Kelly failed drug tests twice during his career. After the 1984 edition of Paris–Brussels, in which he had finished third, cycling authorities stated that a urine sample supplied by Kelly had tested positive for pemoline (Stimul), a result which was repeated with the testing of a B sample. The Royal Belgian Cycling League sentenced Kelly to a three-month suspended ban and a fine. Kelly denied taking any banned substances: in an interview at the time with David Walsh, he claimed that there were "irregularities at the testing centre that day ... the medical control at Paris-Brussels was very badly organised and lots of people were in the room who had no right to be there ... in all this confusion something must have gone wrong". In his autobiography Hunger, Kelly stated that Irish Cycling Federation official Karl McCarthy, who acted as a witness on Kelly's behalf at the second test as he was unable to attend due to racing commitments, told him that the B sample was "tiny" and below the amount required for the test. In his book Massacre à la chaîne: Révélations sur 30 ans de tricheries (Chain massacre: Revelations on 30 years of cheating), Kelly's former soigneur Willy Voet claimed that Kelly had been ill with bronchitis in the week before the race and had taken ephedrine to treat it: to avoid a positive test, Voet wrote that Kelly had carried a container in his shorts filled with urine supplied by one of the team's mechanics to doping control, and that the Stimul detected in the sample had been taken by the mechanic to help him stay awake while driving the team's truck.

Kelly's second positive test occurred at the 1988 Tour of the Basque Country, where he tested positive for codeine. Having finished fourth in the overall classification, he received a ten-minute penalty that dropped him down the order. Kelly explained this as being the result of a worsening cough he had developed during the race: he said that between the end of the final stage and attending doping control he took a swig from a bottle of cough medicine, to which he attributed the presence of codeine in his urine sample.

== Post-cycling career ==
Kelly is a commentator for the English-language services of TNT Sports having previously worked for its predecessor Eurosport where he was described as the "Rolls-Royce of commentators". He is known for giving great insight into races and typically commentates on all the big races including the Tour de France, Giro d'Italia and the Vuelta a España.

He established and is involved in the Sean Kelly Cycling Academy in Belgium. In 2006, he launched Ireland's first professional team, Sean Kelly ACLVB–M.Donnelly, initially composed of Irish and Belgian riders based at the academy in Merchtem, Flanders. Kelly managed the squad with Kurt Bogaerts who rode for the team in its debut year before retiring and moving into management. The team became more international over the years and competed on the UCI Europe Tour until disbanding at the end of 2017. Team riders took eight general classification victories, six elite national road and time trial championships and many more one-day and stage victories with riders including Sam Bennett, Ryan Mullen and Owain Doull representing the team early in their careers.

He has a cycling clothing company which supplies clubs and companies, and which also organises corporate cycling events in Ireland and throughout Europe. He rides long-distance charity cycling tours with Blazing Saddles, a charity raising money for the blind and partially sighted. Such tours have included a journey across America by bike in 2000. He also participates in charity cycling endurance events in Scotland (notably with the Braveheart Cycling Fund), England, France and Ireland. Sean Kelly regularly cycles with SportActive cycling holidays in Mallorca.

The inaugural Sean Kelly Tour of Waterford was held on 19 August 2007. Kelly was one of the 910 participants. The second was on 24 August 2008. Kelly was one of the 2,048. The 2009 Tour went ahead on 30 August 2009. It attracted over 3,400 participants. On 29 August 2010, 3,708 cyclists took part in the Tour. In 2011 the attendance ballooned to over 8,000 over the two days and 10–50–90 and 160 km (6.2–31.1–55.9 and 99.4 mi) events. This ran annually until 2017. In 2018, the organisers of The Sean Kelly Tour of Waterford completed a review and decided not to run the event and to look at other cycling initiatives in and around Waterford.

== Coverage ==
Kelly is the subject of several books, including KELLY A Biography of Sean Kelly by David Walsh in 1986 and SEAN KELLY a man for all seasons by Sean Kelly and David Walsh in 1991.

Sean Kelly published his autobiography Hunger in 2013.

== Awards ==
In December 1986, Sean Kelly won the RTÉ Sports Person of the Year Award. In December 2005, he received the Mick Doyle Golden Memory Award at the Canon Hayes National Sports Awards in Aherlow, County Tipperary. In November 2013, at Dublin City University, he was awarded an Honorary Doctorate in Philosophy in recognition of his contribution to Irish sport. In November 2019, he received a lifetime achievement award at the Cycling Weekly Awards in London.

== Career achievements ==
=== Major results ===
1972
1st Road race, National Junior Road Championships
1973
1st Road race, National Junior Road Championships
1974
1st Shay Elliott Memorial Race
1975
1st Shay Elliott Memorial Race
Tour of Ireland

1st Mountains classification
1st Stages 5, 6 & 7

1st Stage 7 Milk Race
8th Manx Trophy
1976
1st Overall Cinturón a Mallorca
1st Overall The Tour of the North
1st Piccolo Giro di Lombardia
1st Stage 6 Tour of Ireland
1st Stage 6 Milk Race
1977
1st Stage 4 Étoile des Espoirs
2nd Overall Ronde van Nederland
3rd Overall Étoile de Bessèges
3rd Omloop van het Houtland
4th Circuit des Frontières
9th Ronde van Midden-Zeeland
10th Overall Tour de Romandie

1st Stage 1

10th Overall Grand Prix du Midi Libre
1978
Tour de France

1st Stage 6
Held after Stage 2

1st Stage 3 Tour Méditerranéen
1st Stage 5a Étoile des Espoirs
Setmana Catalana de Ciclisme

1st Stages 1a (TTT) & 1b

2nd Stausee-Rundfahrt
1979
1st Grand Prix de Cannes
Vuelta a España

1st Stages 1 & 8a

2nd GP Union Dortmund
7th Dwars door België
9th Road race, UCI Road World Championships
9th Overall Tour of Belgium
10th Omloop Het Volk
1980
1st Overall Three Days of De Panne

1st Points classification
1st Mountains classification
1st Stage 2

Tour de France

1st Stages 19 & 21

1st Stage 3a Critérium du Dauphiné Libéré
1st Stage 4 Ronde van Nederland
2nd E3 Prijs Vlaanderen
2nd Brabantse Pijl
2nd Tour du Haut Var
3rd Amstel Gold Race
3rd Omloop Het Volk
3rd Kuurne–Brussels–Kuurne
4th Overall Vuelta a España

1st Points classification
1st Sprints classification
1st Stages 1, 2, 14, 17 & 19

4th Overall Tour of Belgium
4th Milan–San Remo
4th Grand Prix de Cannes
10th Circuit des Frontières
1981
1st Stage 15 Tour de France
1st Stage 2 Critérium du Dauphiné Libéré
1st Stage 5a Ronde van Nederland
1st Stage 1 Tour of Luxembourg
2nd Overall Four Days of Dunkirk

1st Stage 2

3rd Grote Prijs Jef Scherens
4th La Flèche Wallonne
5th Rund um den Henninger Turm
6th Overall Setmana Catalana de Ciclisme
6th Amstel Gold Race
6th Tour du Haut Var
7th Brabantse Pijl
8th Tour of Flanders
8th Nationale Sluitingsprijs
9th Overall Tour of Belgium

1st Stage 3

9th Züri-Metzgete
1982
1st Overall Paris–Nice

1st Stages 3, 5, 7a & 7b (ITT)

1st Tour du Haut Var
Tour de France

1st Points classification
1st Intermediate Sprints classification
1st Stage 12

Étoile des Espoirs

1st Stages 1 & 3

1st Stage 2 Grand Prix du Midi Libre
1st Points classification, Critérium du Dauphiné Libéré
2nd Critérium des As
3rd Road race, UCI Road World Championships
3rd Omloop Het Volk
3rd Kuurne–Brussels–Kuurne
3rd Rund um den Henninger Turm
4th Amstel Gold Race
5th Giro del Piemonte
6th Overall Critérium International

1st Stage 3 (ITT)

6th GP Ouest–France
7th Overall Tour de l'Aude

1st Stages 1 & 2

7th Druivenkoers Overijse
8th La Flèche Wallonne
10th Liège–Bastogne–Liège
1983
1st Overall Paris–Nice

1st Stages 3a, 4 & 7b (ITT)

1st Overall Tour de Suisse

1st Points classification
1st Combination classification
1st Stages 3 & 5b (ITT)

1st Overall Critérium International

1st Stage 3 (ITT)

1st Giro di Lombardia
1st Grand Prix d'Isbergues
1st Stage 4 Étoile des Espoirs
1st Stage 2 Paris–Bourges
2nd Overall Super Prestige Pernod International
2nd Overall Escalada a Montjuïc
2nd Kuurne–Brussels–Kuurne
2nd Giro del Piemonte
2nd Polynormande
2nd Circuit de l'Aulne
2nd Grand Prix de Monaco
3rd Critérium des As
5th Milan–San Remo
5th Grand Prix de Cannes
6th Trofeo Baracchi
7th Overall Tour de France

1st Points classification
1st Intermediate Sprints classification
Held after Stage 9

8th Road race, UCI Road World Championships
9th Paris–Tours
1984
1st Overall Paris–Nice

1st Stages 2a & 7b (ITT)

1st Overall Volta a Catalunya

1st Points classification
1st Mountains classification
1st Stages 1, 4a, 4b & 7a (ITT)

1st Overall Tour of the Basque Country

1st Points classification
1st Stages 1, 3 & 5b (ITT)

1st Overall Critérium International

1st Stages 1, 2 & 3 (ITT)

1st Overall Super Prestige Pernod International
1st Paris–Roubaix
1st Liège–Bastogne–Liège
1st Paris–Tours
1st Paris–Bourges
1st GP Ouest–France
1st Profronde van Almelo
1st Grand Prix d'Aix-en-Provence
1st Critérium des As
1st Tour de Berne
2nd Tour of Flanders
2nd Milan–San Remo
2nd Grand Prix des Nations
3rd Grand Prix d'Isbergues
3rd Eschborn–Frankfurt
3rd Rund um den Henninger Turm
4th Overall Tour de Suisse

1st Points classification
1st Combination classification
1st Stage 1

4th Overall Tour du Limousin

1st Stages 1b, 2 & 4

5th Overall Tour de France

Held after Stage 22

6th Trofeo Baracchi (with Stephen Roche)
9th Overall La Méditerranéenne
1985
1st Overall Paris–Nice
1st Overall Nissan Classic

1st Stages 1 & 3a (ITT)

1st Overall Super Prestige Pernod International
1st Giro di Lombardia
1st Critérium des As
1st Stage 3 Ronde van Nederland
2nd Overall Volta a Catalunya

1st Points classification
1st Stage 2

2nd Overall Three Days of De Panne
3rd Overall Critérium International

1st Stage 1

3rd Overall Volta a la Comunitat Valenciana

1st Stage 5

3rd Paris–Roubaix
3rd Paris–Tours
4th Overall Tour de France

1st Points classification

4th Overall Tour de Suisse
4th Liège–Bastogne–Liège
5th Paris–Brussels
6th Overall Tour of the Basque Country

1st Points classification
1st Stages 3 & 5b (ITT)

7th Milan–San Remo
7th Gent–Wevelgem
7th Grand Prix des Nations
8th Overall Escalada a Montjuïc
9th Overall Vuelta a España

1st Points classification
1st Stages 2, 10 & 15

9th Overall Ronde van Nederland
9th Grand Prix Eddy Merckx
10th E3 Prijs Vlaanderen
10th Giro del Piemonte
1986
1st Overall Paris–Nice

1st Prologue, Stages 3 & 7b (ITT)

1st Overall Volta a Catalunya

1st Points classification
1st Stage 7 (ITT)

1st Overall Tour of the Basque Country

1st Points classification
1st Stages 3, 5a & 5b (ITT)

1st Overall Nissan Classic
1st Overall Super Prestige Pernod International
1st Milan–San Remo
1st Paris–Roubaix
1st Grand Prix des Nations
1st Critérium des As
Volta a la Comunitat Valenciana

1st Stages 1 & 3

1st Stage 4 Tour du Limousin
2nd Overall Critérium International

1st Stages 1 & 3 (ITT)

2nd Overall Three Days of De Panne

1st Stage 1b (ITT)

2nd Overall Paris–Bourges

1st Stage 2

2nd Tour of Flanders
2nd Giro di Lombardia
2nd GP Ouest–France
2nd Paris–Brussels
3rd Overall Vuelta a España

1st Points classification
1st Combination classification
1st Stages 10 & 13

4th Grand Prix d'Isbergues
5th Road race, UCI Road World Championships
5th La Flèche Wallonne
6th Paris–Tours
7th Overall Vuelta a Aragón

1st Stage 4a

1987
1st Overall Paris–Nice

1st Stage 3

1st Overall Tour of the Basque Country

1st Points classification
1st Mountains classification
1st Stages 4 & 5b (ITT)

1st Overall Critérium International

1st Stages 2 & 3 (ITT)

1st Overall Nissan Classic
Vuelta a España

1st Stages 1 & 3
Held after Stages 1, 3–4, 6 & 18
Held after Stages 1–18

1st Stage 7 Volta a la Comunitat Valenciana
2nd Overall Three Days of De Panne

1st Stage 1b (ITT)

2nd Overall Super Prestige Pernod International
2nd Tour of Flanders
3rd Dwars door België
3rd Critérium des As
4th Overall Grand Prix du Midi Libre
4th Milan–San Remo
4th Paris–Brussels
4th Grand Prix des Nations
5th Overall Volta a Catalunya

1st Points classification
1st Prologue & Stage 1

5th Road race, UCI Road World Championships
10th Overall Escalada a Montjuïc
10th GP Ouest–France
1988
1st Overall Vuelta a España

1st Points classification
1st Combination classification
1st Stages 10 & 19 (ITT)

1st Overall Paris–Nice

1st Stage 6b (ITT)

1st Overall Setmana Catalana de Ciclisme

1st Points classification
1st Stage 4b (ITT)

1st Gent–Wevelgem
Tour of the Basque Country

1st Points classification
1st Stage 4

2nd Tour du Haut Var
2nd Grand Prix de Fourmies
2nd Critérium des As
3rd Overall Kellogg's Tour
3rd Overall Nissan Classic
3rd Paris–Tours
4th Overall Vuelta a Asturias
4th Tour of Flanders
5th Overall Volta a la Comunitat Valenciana
5th Milan–San Remo
5th Liège–Bastogne–Liège
5th Giro del Lazio
7th Omloop Het Volk
10th Overall Tour du Limousin

1st Stages 2b & 3

1989
1st UCI Road World Cup
1st Liège–Bastogne–Liège
1st Stage 4 Critérium du Dauphiné Libéré
2nd Omloop Het Volk
2nd Critérium des As
3rd Road race, UCI Road World Championships
3rd Wincanton Classic
3rd Trofeo Baracchi (with Gianni Bugno)
4th Overall Ronde van Nederland
4th Overall Nissan Classic

1st Mountains classification

4th Ronde van Limburg
5th Milan–San Remo
5th Grand Prix de la Libération (TTT)
6th Overall Three Days of De Panne
7th Overall Tirreno–Adriatico
7th Paris–Tours
8th Trofeo Pantalica
9th Overall Tour de France

1st Points classification
1st Intermediate sprints classification

9th Overall Kellogg's Tour
9th Giro del Piemonte
9th Paris–Brussels
10th Grand Prix Impanis
1990
1st Overall Tour de Suisse

1st Points classification
1st Stage 4

1st Grand Prix de la Libération (TTT)
2nd Wincanton Classic
3rd UCI Road World Cup
3rd Clásica de San Sebastián
4th Ronde van Limburg
5th Road race, UCI Road World Championships
6th Overall Tirreno–Adriatico
8th Overall Critérium International
8th Paris–Tours
8th Trofeo Luis Puig
9th Overall Volta a Catalunya
10th Overall Nissan Classic
10th Giro di Lombardia
1991
1st Overall Nissan Classic
1st Giro di Lombardia
1st Points classification, Tour de Suisse
4th Milano–Torino
4th Trofeo Luis Puig
9th Overall Volta a la Comunitat Valenciana
1992
1st Milan–San Remo
1st Trofeo Luis Puig
1st Stage 7 Tour de Suisse
1st Stage 4 Volta a la Comunitat Valenciana
1st Stage 2 Clásico RCN
4th Kuurne–Brussels–Kuurne
1993
4th Paris–Tours
6th Paris–Bourges
1994
2nd Road race, National Road Championships
4th Grand Prix de Wallonie
6th Overall Tour d'Armorique
10th Overall Route du Sud

=== General classification results timeline ===
Grand Tour general classification results timeline
Grand Tour	1977	1978	1979	1980	1981	1982	1983	1984	1985	1986	1987	1988	1989	1990	1991	1992	1993	1994
Vuelta a España	—	—	DNF	4	—	—	—	—	9	3	DNF	1	—	—	—	—	—	—
Giro d'Italia	—	—	—	—	—	—	—	—	—	—	—	—	—	—	—	DNF	—	—
Tour de France	—	34	38	29	48	15	7	5	4	—	DNF	46	9	30	DNF	43	—	—
Major stage race general classification results timeline
Major stage race	1977	1978	1979	1980	1981	1982	1983	1984	1985	1986	1987	1988	1989	1990	1991	1992	1993	1994
Paris–Nice	40	12	—	—	—	1	1	1	1	1	1	1	—	—	—	—	43	57
Tirreno–Adriatico	—	—	19	32	25	—	—	—	—	—	—	—	7	6	—	50	—	—
Tour of the Basque Country	—	—	—	—	—	—	—	1	6	1	1	17	—	—	—	—	—	—
Tour de Romandie	10	DNF	—	—	—	23	—	—	—	—	—	—	—	—	—	—	—	—
Critérium du Dauphiné	29	—	—	DNF	DNF	15	47	—	21	—	—	—	DNF	28	29	—	—	DNF
Tour de Suisse	—	—	—	—	—	—	1	4	4	DNF	—	16	18	1	11	18	35	—
Volta a Catalunya	12	—	—	—	—	—	—	1	2	1	5	DNF	—	9	—	—	24	—

=== Classics results timeline ===
Monument	1977	1978	1979	1980	1981	1982	1983	1984	1985	1986	1987	1988	1989	1990	1991	1992	1993
Milan–San Remo	75	—	—	4	—	27	5	2	7	1	4	5	5	—	—	1	39
Tour of Flanders	—	—	26	15	8	21	—	2	14	2	2	4	18	—	—	73	39
Paris–Roubaix	—	—	—	—	19	12	—	1	3	1	13	16	15	—	—	29	—
Liège–Bastogne–Liège	—	—	20	—	11	10	—	1	4	12	20	5	1	—	—	37	—
Giro di Lombardia	25	—	—	—	—	34	1	17	1	2	23	—	24	10	1	58	34
Classic	1977	1978	1979	1980	1981	1982	1983	1984	1985	1986	1987	1988	1989	1990	1991	1992	1993
Amstel Gold Race	—	—	—	3	6	4	—	17	—	—	—	—	12	—	27	—	—
Gent–Wevelgem	—	—	32	37	12	18	—	—	7	—	—	1	19	—	—	38	—
La Flèche Wallonne	—	—	—	—	4	8	—	12	21	5	—	—	—	—	—	—	—
Championship of Zürich	31	14	—	—	9	23	—	18	—	—	—	—	26	13	104	23	90
Paris–Brussels	13	—	—	30	14	—	14	—	5	2	4	12	9	—	68	42	—
Paris–Tours	—	23	54	—	17	51	9	1	3	6	28	3	7	8	18	—	4

=== Major championships results timeline ===
Event	1977	1978	1979	1980	1981	1982	1983	1984	1985	1986	1987	1988	1989	1990	1991	1992	1993
World Championships	16	DNF	9	DNF	42	3	8	DNF	35	5	5	25	3	5	DNF	63	49

Legend
—	Did not compete
DNF	Did not finish

=== Grand Tour record ===
	1978	1979	1980	1981	1982	1983	1984	1985	1986	1987	1988	1989	1990	1991	1992
Vuelta a España	DNE	DNF-17	4	DNE	DNE	DNE	DNE	9	3	DNF-19	1	DNE	DNE	DNE	DNE
Stages won	—	2	5	—	—	—	—	3	2	2	2	—	—	—	—
Points classification	—	NR	1	—	—	—	—	1	1	NR	1	—	—	—	—
Mountains classification	—	NR	NR	—	—	—	—	NR	NR	NR	3	—	—	—	—
Giro d'Italia	DNE	DNE	DNE	DNE	DNE	DNE	DNE	DNE	DNE	DNE	DNE	DNE	DNE	DNE	DNS-16
Tour de France	34	38	29	48	15	7	5	4	DNE	DNF-12	46	9	30	DNS-11	43
Stages won	1	0	2	1	1	0	0	0	—	0	0	0	0	0	0
Points classification	12	7	2	7	1	1	2	1	—	—	3	1	5	—	16
Mountains classification	NR	NR	NR	NR	NR	NR	NR	11	—	—	NR	NR	NR	—	60
Young rider classification	—	—	5	—	—	—	—	—	—	—	—	—	—	—	—

Legend
1	Winner
2–3	Top three-finish
4–10	Top ten-finish
11–	Other finish
DNE	Did not enter
DNF-x	Did not finish (retired on stage x)
DNS-x	Did not start (not started on stage x)
HD-x	Finished outside time limit (occurred on stage x)
DSQ	Disqualified
N/A	Race/classification not held
NR	Not ranked in this classification

== See also ==
- Irish cyclists
- Yellow jersey statistics
- List of doping cases in cycling

== Notes and references ==
=== Bibliography ===
- Walsh, David; Kelly, Sean (1991). SEAN KELLY a man for all seasons. Huddersfield, UK: Springfield Books Limited. ISBN 978-1-85688-024-4.
- Magowan, Robin; Watson, Graham (1988). Kings of the Road: A Portrait of Racers and Racing. Huddersfield, UK: Springfield Books Limited. ISBN 978-0-947655-20-4. Archived from the original on 31 July 2022.
- Walsh, David (1987). Kelly: A Biography of Sean Kelly. Grafton Street, London, UK: Grafton Books. ISBN 978-0-586-07387-2. Archived from the original on 31 July 2022.
- Ryan, Barry (2018). The Ascent: Sean Kelly, Stephen Roche and the Rise of Irish Cycling's Golden Generation. Hume Avenue, Park West, Dublin Twelve, Republic of Ireland: Gill Books. ISBN 978-0-7171-8153-7. Archived from the original on 31 July 2022.
