= 1983 Paris–Nice =

Race details
- Dates: 9–16 March 1983
- Stages: 7 + Prologue
- Distance: 1,159.5 km (720.5 mi)
- Winning time: 30h 02' 19"

Results
Jersey awarded to the overall winner	Winner	Sean Kelly (IRL)	(Sem–France Loire–Reydel–Mavic)
	Second	Jean-Marie Grezet (SUI)	(Sem–France Loire–Reydel–Mavic)
	Third	Steven Rooks (NED)	(Sem–France Loire–Reydel–Mavic)

The 1983 Paris–Nice was the 41st edition of the Paris–Nice road cycling stage race and was held from 9 March to 16 March 1983. The race started in Issy-les-Moulineaux and finished at the Col d'Èze. The race was won by Sean Kelly of the Sem–France Loire team.

== Route ==
Stage characteristics and winners
Stage	Date	Course	Distance	Type	Winner
P	9 March	Issy-les-Moulineaux	5.5 km (3.4 mi)	Individual time trial	Eric Vanderaerden (BEL)
1	10 March	Gien to Bourbon-Lancy	196 km (122 mi)		Eddy Planckaert (BEL)
2	11 March	Bourbon-Lancy to Saint-Étienne	212 km (132 mi)		Francis Castaing (FRA)
3a	12 March	Saint-Chamond to Tournon	89 km (55 mi)		Sean Kelly (IRL)
3b	12 March	Tain-l'Hermitage	35 km (22 mi)	Team time trial	Jacky Aernoudt–Rossin–Campagnolo
4	13 March	Bollène to Miramas	186 km (116 mi)		Sean Kelly (IRL)
5	14 March	Miramas to La Seyne	183 km (114 mi)		Ferdi Van Den Haute (BEL)
6	15 March	La Seyne to Mandelieu	182 km (113 mi)		Dirk De Wolf (BEL)
7a	16 March	Mandelieu to Nice	60 km (37 mi)		Eric Vanderaerden (BEL)
7b	16 March	Nice/Col d'Èze	11 km (6.8 mi)	Individual time trial	Sean Kelly (IRL)

== General classification ==
Final general classification

Rank	Rider	Team	Time
1	Sean Kelly (IRL)	Sem–France Loire–Reydel–Mavic	30h 02' 19"
2	Jean-Marie Grezet (SUI)	Sem–France Loire–Reydel–Mavic	+ 1' 03"
3	Steven Rooks (NED)	Sem–France Loire–Reydel–Mavic	+ 1' 14"
4	Joop Zoetemelk (NED)	COOP–Mercier–Mavic	+ 1' 42"
5	Michel Laurent (FRA)	COOP–Mercier–Mavic	+ 2' 26"
6	René Bittinger (FRA)	Sem–France Loire–Reydel–Mavic	+ 3' 59"
7	Paul Haghedooren (BEL)	Splendor–Euro Shop	+ 7' 22"
8	Adri van der Poel (NED)	Jacky Aernoudt–Rossin–Campagnolo	+ 7' 28"
9	Graham Jones (GBR)	Wolber–Spidel	+ 8' 42"
10	Frédéric Brun (FRA)	Peugeot–Shell–Michelin	+ 9' 16"
