= Grand Prix de Cannes =

Race details
- Region: Cannes, Alpes-Maritimes, France
- Discipline: Road
- Type: One-day race

History
- First edition: 1926
- Editions: 61
- Final edition: 1991
- First winner: François Urago (FRA)
- Most wins: René Vietto (FRA) (3 wins)
- Final winner: Yvon Madiot (FRA)

The Grand Prix de Cannes was a single-day road cycling held annually in Cannes, Alpes-Maritimes, France from 1926 to 1991.

== Winners ==
Year	Winner	Second	Third
1926	(France) François Urago	(France) Sébastien Piccardo	(France) Paulin Lanteri
1927	(France) Louis Gras	(France) Embarek Fliffel	(France) François Menta
1928	(France) Giuseppe Rivella	(France) Louis Gras	(Italy) Giuseppe Enrici
1929	(France) Yves Le Goff	(Italy) Felice Gremo	(France) Antoine Mugnaoni
1930	(France) Gaspard Rinaldi	(France) Jean Maréchal	(France) René Brossy
1931	(France) Louis Gras	(France) Adrien Butafocchi	(France) Louis Minardi
1932	(France) René Vietto	(Italy) Luigi Barral	(France) Pierre Pastorelli
1933	(France) René Vietto	(France) Fernand Cornez	(France) Clément Bistagne
1934	(France) Fernand Cornez	(France) Louis Aimar	(France) Roger Cottyn
1935	(France) Antonio Zanella	(Switzerland) Léo Amberg	(Italy) Antoine Arnaldi
1936	(France) Alfred Weck	(France) Adrien Butafocchi	(France) Raymond Louviot
1937	(Italy) Giuseppe Martano	(France) Lucien Lauk	(Italy) Luigi Barral
1938	(France) Lucien Lauk	(Italy) Elia Frosio	(France) André Deforge
1939	(Switzerland) Karl Litschi	(France) André Deforge	(Italy) Giuseppe Martino
1941	(France) Bruno Carini	(France) René Vietto	(Italy) Fermo Camellini
1942	(France) Gino Proietti	(France) Victor Pernac	(France) Dante Gianello
1946	(Italy) Paul Néri	(France) Joseph Soffietti	(France) Pierre Baratin
1947	(France) Raymond Guégan	(France) Joseph Soffietti	(France) Lucien Lauk
1948	(France) René Vietto	(Italy) Paul Néri	(France) Édouard Fachleitner
1949	(France) Antonin Canavese	(France) Édouard Fachleitner	(France) Jesus Moujica
1950	(France) Édouard Fachleitner	(France) Nello Lauredi	(France) Antoine Giauna
1951	(France) Lucien Teisseire	(Portugal) Fernando Moreira	(France) Raoul Rémy
1952	(France) Louison Bobet	(France) Pierre Molinéris	(France) Adolphe Pezzuli
1953	(France) Pierre Baratin	(Italy) Angelo Conterno	(France) Émile Rol
1954	(France) Gilbert Bauvin	(France) Jean Leullier	(Belgium) Alex Close
1955	(France) Jean Forestier	(France) Raoul Rémy	(France) René Privat
1956	(France) Joseph Mirando	(France) Yvon Ramella	(France) Vincent Vitetta
1957	(France) Antonin Rolland	(France) Tino Sabbadini	(France) Joseph Mirando
1958	(France) Tino Sabbadini	(France) Gilbert Bauvin	(France) Joseph Mirando
1959	(France) Francis Anastasi	(France) Claude Mattio	(France) Emmanuel Busto
1960	(France) Jean Bonifassi	(France) Albert Bouvet	(France) Claude Mattio
1961	(Italy) Nino Defilippis	(France) Claude Valdois	(France) Raymond Poulidor
1962	(West Germany) Rudi Altig	(France) François Le Her	(France) Fernand Picot
1963	(France) François Mahé	(France) Raymond Poulidor	(Republic of Ireland) Ian Moore
1964	(France) Raymond Poulidor	(West Germany) Winfried Bölke	(France) Jean Dupont
1965	(Italy) Michele Dancelli	(France) Jean-Claude Wuillemin	(France) Jean Jourden
1966	(Italy) Flavio Vicentini	(Italy) Carmine Preziosi	(France) Gilbert Bellone
1967	(France) Jean-Paul Paris	(France) Charly Grosskost	(France) Maurice Izier
1968	(France) Jacques Cadiou	(France) Claude Guyot	(France) Jean-Louis Bodin
1969	(France) Gilbert Bellone	(Netherlands) Arie den Hartog	(France) José Catieau
1970	(France) Paul Gutty	(France) Gilbert Bellone	(France) Désiré Letort
1971	(Belgium) Frans Verbeeck	(United Kingdom) Derek Harrison	(France) Michel Perin
1972	(Italy) Roberto Poggiali	(France) Michel Perin	(Italy) Giuseppe Berletto
1973	(Netherlands) Tino Tabak	(Denmark) Leif Mortensen	(France) Claude Tollet
1974	(Italy) Franco Bitossi	(Belgium) Frans Verbeeck	(Netherlands) Tino Tabak
1975	(France) Jean-Pierre Danguillaume	(Netherlands) Fedor den Hertog	(France) Maurice Le Guilloux
1976	(France) Georges Talbourdet	(France) Sylvain Vasseur	(France) Jean-Luc Molinéris
1977	No race		
1978	(Belgium) Wilfried Wesemael	(Sweden) Sven-Åke Nilsson	(France) Yvon Bertin
1979	(Republic of Ireland) Sean Kelly	(Belgium) Walter Planckaert	(Netherlands) Henk Lubberding
1980	(Netherlands) Jan Raas	(Belgium) Rik Van Linden	(France) Pierre-Raymond Villemiane
1981	(Denmark) Kim Andersen	(France) Pierre-Raymond Villemiane	(Republic of Ireland) Stephen Roche
1982	(France) Laurent Fignon	(France) Patrick Stephan	(Switzerland) Hubert Seiz
1983	(Switzerland) Gilbert Glaus	(Switzerland) Jean-Marie Grezet	(Switzerland) Patrick Moerlen
1984	(France) Yvon Madiot	(France) Pierre Bazzo	(France) Laurent Biondi
1985	(Netherlands) Adri van der Poel	(France) Frédéric Vichot	(Australia) Allan Peiper
1986	(Switzerland) Gilbert Glaus	(France) Charly Bérard	(France) Jérôme Simon
1987	(United Kingdom) Sean Yates	(France) Frédéric Vichot	(Switzerland) Gilbert Glaus
1988	(France) Jérôme Simon	(Germany) Andreas Kappes	(France) Bruno Wojtinek
1989	(France) Roland Le Clerc	(France) Luc Leblanc	(France) Régis Simon
1990	(France) Gérard Rué	(Germany) Udo Bölts	(Belgium) Frank Van Den Abeele
1991	(France) Yvon Madiot	(United Kingdom) Harry Lodge	(France) Laurent Jalabert
