= 1985 Ronde van Nederland =

Dutch cycling race

These are the results for the 25th edition of the Ronde van Nederland cycling race, which was held from August 20 to August 25, 1985. The race started in Winschoten (Groningen) and finished in Den Bosch (North Brabant).

== Stages ==
=== 20-08-1985: Winschoten-Winschoten (Prologue), 6.6 km ===
RANK	NAME CYCLIST	TEAM	TIME
1.	Bert Oosterbosch (NED)		00:08:25
2.	Eric Vanderaerden (BEL)		+ 0.11
3.	Ron Groen (NED)		+ 0.15

=== 21-08-1985: Assen-Nijmegen, 250 km ===
RANK	NAME CYCLIST	TEAM	TIME
1.	Eric Vanderaerden (BEL)		06:09:43
2.	Werner Devos (BEL)		—
3.	Jan Bogaert (BEL)		—

=== 22-08-1985: Nijmegen-Schagen, 251 km ===
RANK	NAME CYCLIST	TEAM	TIME
1.	Eddy Planckaert (BEL)		06:12:41
2.	Teun van Vliet (NED)		—
3.	Walter Planckaert (BEL)		—

=== 23-08-1985: Schagen-Den Haag, 181 km ===
RANK	NAME CYCLIST	TEAM	TIME
1.	Sean Kelly (IRL)		04:53:39
2.	Eric Vanderaerden (BEL)		—
3.	Werner Devos (BEL)		—

=== 24-08-1985: Den Haag-Zundert, 227 km ===
RANK	NAME CYCLIST	TEAM	TIME
1.	Jacques Hanegraaf (NED)		05:21:07
2.	Patrick Cocquyt (BEL)		+ 0.07
3.	Sean Kelly (IRL)		+ 1.04

=== 25-08-1985: Breda-Den Bosch, 123 km ===
RANK	NAME CYCLIST	TEAM	TIME
1.	Eric Vanderaerden (BEL)		02:38:28
2.	Sean Kelly (IRL)		—
3.	Werner Devos (BEL)		—

=== 25-08-1985: Oss-Den Bosch (Team Time Trial), 36.4 km ===
RANK	TEAM	NATION	TIME
1.	Panasonic	Netherlands	00:43:28
2.	Kwantum Hallen	Netherlands	+ 0.51
3.	Verandalux	Belgium	+ 1.28

== Final classification ==
RANK	NAME CYCLIST	TEAM	TIME
1.	Eric Vanderaerden (BEL)		25:23:37
2.	Theo de Rooij (NED)		+ 0.50
3.	Adri van Houwelingen (NED)		+ 1.01
4.	Adri van der Poel (NED)		+ 1.02
5.	Leo van Vliet (NED)		+ 1.15
6.	Twan Poels (NED)		+ 1.19
7.	Jörg Müller (SUI)		+ 1.21
8.	Jan van Houwelingen (NED)		+ 1.29
9.	Sean Kelly (IRL)		—
10.	Johnny Broers (NED)		+ 1.40
