= Frédéric Vichot =

French cyclist

Personal information
- Full name: Frédéric Vichot
- Born: May 1, 1959 (age 67) Valay, France

Cycling career
- Sport: Cycling
- Discipline: Road
- Role: Rider

Professional teams
- 1981–1983: Miko–Mercier–Vivagel
- 1984–1985: Skil–Reydel–Sem–Mavic
- 1986–1987: Kas
- 1988–1990: Weinmann–La Suisse–SMM Uster
- 1991: Castorama–Raleigh
- 1992: RMO

Major wins
- 1 stage Vuelta a España; 2 stages Tour de France

Frédéric Vichot (born 1 May 1959) is a French former professional road bicycle racer, who won one stage in the Vuelta a España and two stages in the Tour de France. He is the uncle of racing cyclist Arthur Vichot.

== Major results ==
1979
1st Stage 3b Tour de Liège
1980
1st Overall Circuit des Mines

1st Stage 3

1st Stage 3 Étoile des Espoirs
1st Stage 4 Route de France
9th Overall Tour de l'Avenir
1981
1st Stage 12 Vuelta a España
1982
6th Overall Étoile des Espoirs
1983
1st Stage 3 Tour de l'Avenir
1984
1st Stage 15 Tour de France
2nd GP Ouest–France
5th Overall Critérium International
7th Overall Paris–Nice
7th Amstel Gold Race
8th Overall Route du Sud
1985
1st Stage 16 Tour de France
2nd Grand Prix de Cannes
3rd Overall Paris–Nice
3rd Overall Route du Sud
10th Züri-Metzgete
10th Overall Tour Méditerranéen
1987
2nd Grand Prix de Cannes
5th Overall Étoile de Bessèges
1989
10th Paris–Brussels
1990
2nd Overall Route du Sud
9th Giro dell'Etna
1992
6th Overall Tour de Luxembourg

=== Grand Tour general classification results timeline ===
Grand Tour	1981	1982	1983	1984	1985	1986	1987	1988	1989	1990	1991
Giro d'Italia	—	—	—	—	—	—	—	—	—	—	DNF
Tour de France	—	—	—	23	31	100	—	28	37	—	20
Vuelta a España	21	—	—	—	—	—	—	—	—	—	—
