= 1983 Tour de Suisse =

Race details
- Dates: 14–24 June 1983
- Stages: 10 + Prologue
- Distance: 1,808.5 km (1,124 mi)
- Winning time: 48h 31' 13"

Results
	Winner	Sean Kelly (IRL)	(Sem–France Loire–Reydel–Mavic)
	Second	Peter Winnen (NED)	(TI–Raleigh–Campagnolo)
	Third	Jean-Marie Grezet (SUI)	(Sem–France Loire–Reydel–Mavic)
	Points	Sean Kelly (IRL)	(Sem–France Loire–Reydel–Mavic)
	Mountains	Acácio da Silva (POR)	(Varta–Colombia)
	Combination	Sean Kelly (IRL)	(Sem–France Loire–Reydel–Mavic)
	Team	Sem–France Loire–Reydel–Mavic	

The 1983 Tour de Suisse was the 47th edition of the Tour de Suisse cycle race and was held from 14 June to 24 June 1983. The race started in Seuzach and finished in Zürich. The race was won by Sean Kelly of the Sem–France Loire team.

== General classification ==
Final general classification

Rank	Rider	Team	Time
1	Sean Kelly (IRL)	Sem–France Loire–Reydel–Mavic	48h 31' 13"
2	Peter Winnen (NED)	TI–Raleigh–Campagnolo	+ 1' 18"
3	Jean-Marie Grezet (SUI)	Sem–France Loire–Reydel–Mavic	+ 1' 19"
4	Greg LeMond (USA)	Renault–Elf	+ 1' 38"
5	Stefan Mutter (SUI)	Eorotex–Magniflex	+ 1' 46"
6	Mario Beccia (ITA)	Malvor–Bottecchia	+ 1' 48"
7	Jostein Wilmann (NOR)	Eorotex–Magniflex	+ 2' 21"
8	Acácio da Silva (POR)	Eorotex–Magniflex	+ 2' 50"
9	Paul Wellens (BEL)	Eorotex–Magniflex	+ 2' 54"
10	Beat Breu (SUI)	Cilo–Aufina	+ 3' 01"
