= 1985 Paris–Nice =

Race details
- Dates: 3–10 March 1985
- Stages: 7 + Prologue
- Distance: 1,185.9 km (736.9 mi)
- Winning time: 31h 10' 19"

Results
Jersey awarded to the overall winner	Winner	Sean Kelly (IRL)	(Skil–Sem–Kas–Miko)
	Second	Stephen Roche (IRL)	(La Redoute)
	Third	Frédéric Vichot (FRA)	(Skil–Sem–Kas–Miko)

The 1985 Paris–Nice was the 43rd edition of the Paris–Nice cycle race and was held from 3 March to 10 March 1985. The race started in Nanterre and finished at the Col d'Èze. The race was won by Sean Kelly of the Skil team.

== Route and stages ==
The race began with a short prologue individual time trial and featured seven road stages, including a team time trial and finishing with a mountain time trial.

List of stages
Stage	Date	Course	Distance	Type	Winner	Race leader
P	3 March	Nanterre	6.4 km (4.0 mi)	Individual time trial	Allan Peiper (AUS)	Allan Peiper (AUS)
1	4 March	Avallon to Dole	197.5 km (123 mi)		Eddy Planckaert (BEL)	Allan Peiper (AUS)
2	5 March	Dole to St Trivier	181 km (112 mi)		Marc Madiot (FRA)	Bert Oosterbosch (NED)
3	6 March	Châtillon-sur-Chalaronne to Saint-Étienne	176 km (109 mi)		Eddy Planckaert (BEL)	Allan Peiper (AUS)
4a	7 March	Donzère to Bédoin	98 km (61 mi)		Joël Pelier (FRA)	Joël Pelier (FRA)
4b	7 March	Bédoin to Carpentras	35 km (22 mi)	Team time trial	Panasonic–Raleigh	Joël Pelier (FRA)
5	8 March	Carpentras to Gréoux-les-Bains	211 km (131 mi)		Bert Oosterbosch (NED)	Frédéric Vichot (FRA)
6	9 March	Gréoux-les-Bains to Mandelieu-la-Napoule	171 km (106 mi)		Pedro Muñoz (ESP)	Frédéric Vichot (FRA)
7a	10 March	La Napoule	100 km (62 mi)		Charly Mottet (FRA)	Frédéric Vichot (FRA)
7b	10 March	Col d'Èze	11 km (7 mi)	Individual time trial	Stephen Roche (IRL)	Sean Kelly (IRL)

== General classification ==
Final general classification

Rank	Rider	Team	Time
1	Sean Kelly (IRL)	Skil–Sem–Kas–Miko	31h 10' 19"
2	Stephen Roche (IRL)	La Redoute	+ 23"
3	Frédéric Vichot (FRA)	Skil–Sem–Kas–Miko	+ 54"
4	Phil Anderson (AUS)	Panasonic–Raleigh	+ 1' 04"
5	Pedro Muñoz (ESP)	Fagor	+ 1' 56"
6	Robert Millar (GBR)	Peugeot–Shell–Michelin	+ 2' 11"
7	Éric Caritoux (FRA)	Skil–Sem–Kas–Miko	+ 2' 17"
8	Pascal Simon (FRA)	Peugeot–Shell–Michelin	+ 2' 21"
9	Charly Mottet (FRA)	Renault–Elf	+ 2' 33"
10	Jean-Marie Grezet (SUI)	Skil–Sem–Kas–Miko	+ 2' 35"
