= Jean-Claude Bagot =

French cyclist (born 1958)

Personal information
- Full name: Jean-Claude Bagot
- Born: 9 March 1958 (age 68) Saint-Hilaire-du-Harcouët, France

Cycling career
- Sport: Cycling
- Discipline: Road
- Role: Rider

Professional teams
- 1983: UC Saint-Étienne–Pélussin
- 1984: Skil–Reydel–Sem–Mavic
- 1985–1988: Fagor
- 1989–1990: RMO
- 1991–1993: Castorama–Raleigh
- 1994: Festina–Lotus

Major wins
- Grand Tours Giro d'Italia 1 Stage (1987)

Jean-Claude Bagot (born 9 March 1958) is a French former professional cyclist. He raced professionally between the years of 1983 and 1994. He is most known for winning one stage in the 1987 Giro d'Italia and winning the general classification in the 1984 Tour Méditerranéen. He also competed in a total of 17 Grand Tours, including nine editions of the Tour de France, three of the Giro d'Italia and five of the Vuelta a España. His best finish was ninth overall in the 1989 Vuelta a España.

His son, Yoann, also competed as a professional cyclist, but retired in 2019.

== Major results ==
1984
1st Overall Tour Méditerranéen

1st Stage 3

1st Stage 1 Étoile des Espoirs
3rd Overall Tour d'Armorique
6th Overall GP du Midi-Libre
8th Grand Prix de Mauléon-Moulins
9th Overall Critérium International
10th Overall Paris–Nice
1985
2nd Polynormande
9th Overall GP du Midi-Libre
10th Overall Setmana Catalana de Ciclisme
1986
2nd Overall Setmana Catalana de Ciclisme
3rd Road race, National Road Championships
4th Overall Critérium du Dauphiné Libéré
5th Subida a Arrate
8th Overall GP du Midi-Libre
1987
1st Stage 6 Giro d'Italia
1st Stage 8b Volta a Catalunya
2nd GP Ouest France-Plouay
6th Overall Paris–Nice

1st Stage 6

1988
9th Overall Tour of the Basque Country
1989
9th Overall Vuelta a España
1990
3rd Polynormande
