= 1984 Volta a Catalunya =

Race details
- Dates: 5–12 September 1984
- Stages: 7 + Prologue
- Distance: 1,251.2 km (777.5 mi)
- Winning time: 30h 46' 44"

Results
	Winner	Sean Kelly (IRL)	(Skil–Reydel–Sem–Mavic)
	Second	Pedro Muñoz (ESP)	(Teka)
	Third	Ángel Arroyo (ESP)	(Reynolds)
	Points	Sean Kelly (IRL)	(Skil–Reydel–Sem–Mavic)
	Mountains	Sean Kelly (IRL)	(Skil–Reydel–Sem–Mavic)
	Sprints	Herman Frison (BEL)	(Safir–Van de Ven)
	Team	Teka	

The 1984 Volta a Catalunya was the 64th edition of the Volta a Catalunya cycle race and was held from 5 September to 12 September 1984. The race started in Platja d'Aro and finished at Girona. The race was won by Sean Kelly of the Skil team.

== General classification ==
Final general classification

Rank	Rider	Team	Time
1	Sean Kelly (IRL)	Skil–Reydel–Sem–Mavic	30h 46' 44"
2	Pedro Muñoz (ESP)	Teka	+ 0"
3	Ángel Arroyo (ESP)	Reynolds	+ 1' 51"
4	Alberto Fernández (ESP)	Zor–Gemeaz Cusin	+ 2' 03"
5	Julián Gorospe (ESP)	Reynolds	+ 3' 52"
6	Vicente Belda (ESP)	Kelme	+ 3' 54"
7	Robert Millar (GBR)	Peugeot–Shell–Michelin	+ 4' 04"
8	Antonio Coll (ESP)	Teka	+ 4' 17"
9	Patrocinio Jiménez (COL)	Teka	+ 5' 42"
10	Eduardo Chozas (ESP)	Zor–Gemeaz Cusin	+ 6' 23"
