= 1985 Grand Prix d'Automne =

Race details
- Dates: 6 October 1985
- Stages: 1
- Distance: 249 km (154.7 mi)
- Winning time: 6h 27' 36"

Results
	Winner	Ludo Peeters (BEL)
	Second	Moreno Argentin (ITA)
	Third	Sean Kelly (IRL)

The 1985 Grand Prix d'Automne was the 79th edition of the Paris–Tours cycle race and was held on 6 October 1985. The race started in Créteil and finished in Chaville. The race was won by Ludo Peeters.

== General classification ==
Final general classification

Rank	Rider	Time
1	Ludo Peeters (BEL)	6h 27' 36"
2	Moreno Argentin (ITA)	+ 21"
3	Sean Kelly (IRL)	+ 21"
4	Teun van Vliet (NED)	+ 21"
5	Jean-Luc Vandenbroucke (BEL)	+ 21"
6	Adri van der Poel (NED)	+ 21"
7	Régis Clère (FRA)	+ 21"
8	Leo van Vliet (NED)	+ 1' 04"
9	Thierry Marie (FRA)	+ 1' 06"
10	Rudy Dhaenens (BEL)	+ 2' 18"
