= 1988 Paris–Nice =

Race details
- Dates: 8–13 March 1988
- Stages: 6
- Distance: 1,035.6 km (643.5 mi)
- Winning time: 27h 27' 01"

Results
Jersey awarded to the overall winner	Winner	Sean Kelly (IRL)	(Kas–Canal 10)
	Second	Ronan Pensec (FRA)	(Z–Peugeot)
	Third	Julián Gorospe (ESP)	(Reynolds)

The 1988 Paris–Nice was the 46th edition of the Paris–Nice cycle race and was held from 6 March to 15 March 1988. The race started in Paris and finished at the Col d'Èze. The race was won by Sean Kelly of the Kas team.

== Route ==
Stage characteristics and winners
Stage	Date	Course	Distance	Type	Winner
1	8 March	Villefranche-sur-Saône to Saint-Étienne	194 km (121 mi)		Sean Yates (GBR)
2	9 March	Saint-Étienne to Valréas	200 km (120 mi)		Søren Lilholt (DEN)
3	10 March	Salon-de-Provence to Toulon/Mont Faron	179 km (111 mi)		Andrew Hampsten (USA)
4	11 March	Toulon to Saint-Tropez	175 km (109 mi)		Etienne De Wilde (BEL)
5	12 March	Saint-Tropez to Mandelieu-la-Napoule	167 km (104 mi)		Patrice Esnault (FRA)
6a	13 March	Mandelieu to Nice	100 km (62 mi)		Andreas Kappes (FRG)
6b	13 March	Nice to Col d'Èze	10 km (6.2 mi)	Individual time trial	Sean Kelly (IRL)

== General classification ==
Final general classification

Rank	Rider	Team	Time
1	Sean Kelly (IRL)	Kas–Canal 10	27h 27' 01"
2	Ronan Pensec (FRA)	Z–Peugeot	+ 18"
3	Julián Gorospe (ESP)	Reynolds	+ 36"
4	Pascal Simon (FRA)	Système U–Gitane	+ 1' 20"
5	Laurent Fignon (FRA)	Système U–Gitane	+ 2' 08"
6	Luc Leblanc (FRA)	Toshiba–Look	+ 2' 46"
7	Peter Hilse (FRG)	Teka	+ 2' 52"
8	Álvaro Pino (ESP)	BH	+ 2' 52"
9	Robert Millar (GBR)	Fagor–MBK	+ 3' 03"
10	Jaanus Kuum (NOR)	AD Renting–Mini-Flat–Enerday	+ 3' 30"
