= 1988 Gent–Wevelgem =

Race details
- Dates: 20 April 1988
- Stages: 1
- Distance: 275 km (171 mi)
- Winning time: 7h 20' 00"

Results
	Winner	Sean Kelly (IRL)	(Kas–Canal 10)
	Second	Gianni Bugno (ITA)	(Chateau d'Ax)
	Third	Ron Kiefel (USA)	(7-Eleven–Hoonved)

The 1988 Gent–Wevelgem was the 50th edition of the Belgian Gent–Wevelgem cycle race and was held on 20 April 1988. The race started in Ghent and finished in Wevelgem. The race was won by Sean Kelly of the Kas team.

== General classification ==
Final general classification

Rank	Rider	Team	Time
1	Sean Kelly (IRL)	Kas–Canal 10	7h 20' 00"
2	Gianni Bugno (ITA)	Chateau d'Ax	+ 0"
3	Ron Kiefel (USA)	7-Eleven–Hoonved	+ 0"
4	Ludo Peeters (BEL)	Superconfex–Yoko–Opel–Colnago	+ 0"
5	Claude Criquielion (BEL)	Hitachi–Bosal–B.C.E. Snooker	+ 0"
6	Steve Bauer (CAN)	Weinmann–La Suisse–SMM Uster	+ 25"
7	Alfons De Wolf (BEL)	AD Renting–Mini-Flat–Enerday	+ 25"
8	Rudy Dhaenens (BEL)	PDM–Ultima–Concorde	+ 25"
9	Søren Lilholt (DEN)	Sigma–Fina	+ 25"
10	Eddy Planckaert (BEL)	AD Renting–Mini-Flat–Enerday	+ 1' 36"
