= 1985 Paris–Roubaix =

Race details
- Dates: 14 April 1985
- Stages: 1
- Distance: 268 km (167 mi)
- Winning time: 7h 21' 10"

Results
	Winner	Marc Madiot (FRA)	(Renault-Elf)
	Second	Bruno Wojtinek (FRA)	(Renault-Elf)
	Third	Sean Kelly (IRL)	(Skil-Sem)

The 1985 Paris–Roubaix took place on 14 April in rainy conditions.

At one point, former three times winner Francesco Moser looked the serious contender, but a crash due to a hole between cobbles and a slow repair of his equipment eliminated Moser from the final.

About 15 kilometres from Roubaix, Marc Madiot escaped from an eight-man group with among others defending race winner Sean Kelly. Madiot held on and entered the velodrome in Roubaix on his own to win. Bruno Wojtinek, leaving the chase group some two kilometres from the line, finished second, cementing a French double. Sean Kelly and Greg LeMond were the next riders home having avoided a crash just as the chasing group was entering the velodrome in Roubaix.

Below, the results for the 1985 edition of the Paris–Roubaix cycling classic.

== Results ==
=== 1985: Paris–Roubaix, 265 km. ===
	Cyclist	Team	Time
1	Marc Madiot (FRA)	Renault-Elf	7h 21'10"
2	Bruno Wojtinek (FRA)	Renault-Elf	at 1'57
3	Sean Kelly (IRE)	Skil	at 2'09
4	Greg LeMond (USA)	La Vie Claire	s.t.
5	Rudy Dhaenens (BEL)	Hitachi	s.t.
6	Eddy Planckaert (BEL)	Panasonic	s.t.
7	Jozef Lieckens (BEL)	Lotto	s.t.
8	Hennie Kuiper (NED)	Verandalux	at 3'30
9	Adri van der Poel (NED)	Kwantum	s.t.
10	Ferdi Van Den Haute (BEL)	La Redoute	at 5'04
