= 1989 UCI Road World Championships – Men's road race =

Men's Individual Road Race
1989 UCI Road World Championships
- Rainbow jersey

Race details
- Dates: 27 August 1989
- Stages: 1
- Distance: 259.35 km (161.15 mi)
- Winning time: 6h 45' 59"

Medalists
	Gold	Greg LeMond (USA)	(United States)
	Silver	Dimitri Konyshev (URS)	(Soviet Union)
	Bronze	Sean Kelly (IRL)	(Ireland)

The men's road race at the 1989 UCI Road World Championships was the 56th edition of the event. The race took place on Sunday 27 August 1989, in Chambéry, France. It consisted of 21 laps of a 12.5km circuit for a total distance of 259.35 kilometres (161.15 mi) where the major difficulty was a 3rd category climb to the village of Montagnole, 3.2 km at 6.1% average slope.

190 riders started, there were 42 classified finishers, and the winner's average speed was 38.33 km/h (23.82 mph).

The rain-soaked race concluded with a four-way sprint won by Greg LeMond of the United States. By winning the race, LeMond achieved two cycling doubles: This was his second World Championship road race win, following his victory at the 1983 event. He was also the World Championship road race and a Grand Tour winner in the same year, after his success at the 1989 Tour de France.

== Final classification ==
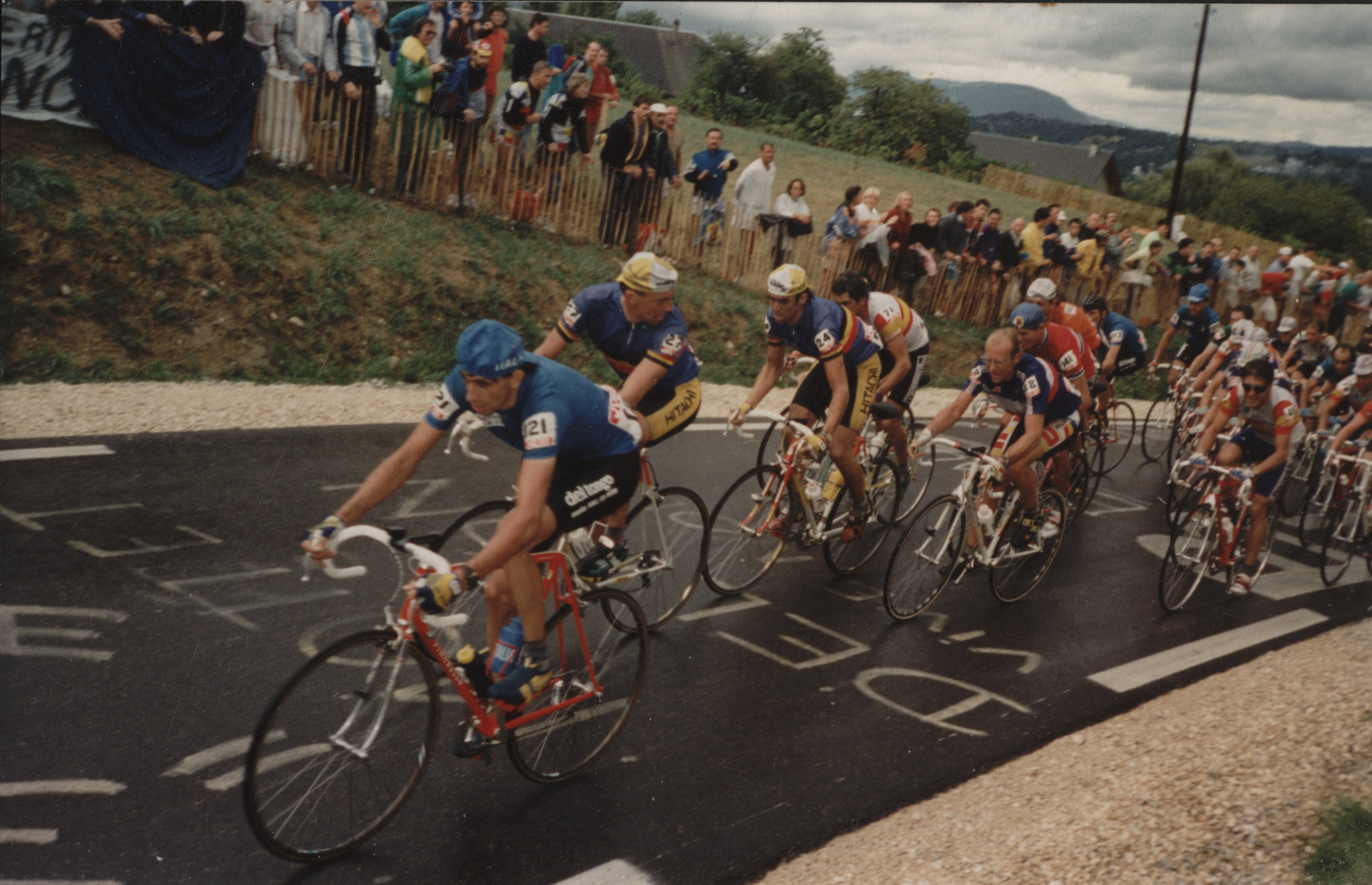
UCI World Championship men's road race, Sunday 27 August 1989, in Chambéry, France. Chase group on Cote de Montagnole includes Franco Chioccioli, Claude Criquelion, Laurent Fignon, and Pedro Delgado.

General classification (1–10)

Rank	Rider	Time
1st place, gold medalist(s)	Greg LeMond (USA)	6h 45' 59"
2nd place, silver medalist(s)	Dimitri Konyshev (URS)	+ 0"
3rd place, bronze medalist(s)	Sean Kelly (IRL)	+ 0"
4	Steven Rooks (NED)	+ 0"
5	Thierry Claveyrolat (FRA)	+ 3"
6	Laurent Fignon (FRA)	+ 3"
7	Martin Earley (IRL)	+ 10"
8	Gianni Bugno (ITA)	+ 10"
9	Rolf Sørensen (DEN)	+ 10"
10	Claude Criquielion (BEL)	+ 10"
