= 1984 GP Ouest-France =

Race details
- Dates: 21 August 1984
- Stages: 1
- Distance: 218 km (135.5 mi)
- Winning time: 5h 38' 34"

Results
	Winner	Sean Kelly (IRL)	(Skil–Reydel–Sem–Mavic)
	Second	Frédéric Vichot (FRA)	(Skil–Reydel–Sem–Mavic)
	Third	Éric Caritoux (FRA)	(Skil–Reydel–Sem–Mavic)

The 1984 GP Ouest-France was the 48th edition of the GP Ouest-France cycle race and was held on 21 August 1984. The race started and finished in Plouay. The race was won by Sean Kelly of the Skil team.

== General classification ==
Final general classification

Rank	Rider	Team	Time
1	Sean Kelly (IRL)	Skil–Reydel–Sem–Mavic	5h 38' 34"
2	Frédéric Vichot (FRA)	Skil–Reydel–Sem–Mavic	+ 2"
3	Éric Caritoux (FRA)	Skil–Reydel–Sem–Mavic	+ 3"
4	Philippe Bouvatier (FRA)	Renault–Elf	+ 3"
5	Christian Levavasseur (FRA)	La Redoute	+ 3"
6	Philippe Leleu (FRA)	La Vie Claire	+ 13"
7	Pascal Simon (FRA)	Peugeot–Shell–Michelin	+ 13"
8	Dominique Garde (FRA)	Peugeot–Shell–Michelin	+ 17"
9	Marc Gomez (FRA)	La Vie Claire	+ 20"
10	Régis Clère (FRA)	COOP–Hoonved	+ 27"
