= 1986 Milan–San Remo =

Race details
- Dates: 15 March 1986
- Stages: 1
- Distance: 293 km (182 mi)
- Winning time: 6h 57' 19"

Results
	Winner	Sean Kelly (IRL)	(Kas)
	Second	Greg LeMond (USA)	(La Vie Claire)
	Third	Mario Beccia (ITA)	(Malvor–Bottecchia–Vaporella)

The 1986 Milan–San Remo was the 77th edition of the Milan–San Remo cycle race and was held on 15 March 1986. The race started in Milan and finished in San Remo. The race was won by Sean Kelly of the Kas team.

== General classification ==
Final general classification

Rank	Rider	Team	Time
1	Sean Kelly (IRL)	Kas	6h 57' 19"
2	Greg LeMond (USA)	La Vie Claire	+ 0"
3	Mario Beccia (ITA)	Malvor–Bottecchia–Vaporella	+ 0"
4	Giuseppe Saronni (ITA)	Del Tongo	+ 23"
5	Bruno Wojtinek (FRA)	Peugeot–Shell	+ 23"
6	Luciano Rabottini (ITA)	Vini Ricordi–Pinarello–Sidermec	+ 23"
7	Adri van der Poel (NED)	Kwantum–Decosol–Yoko	+ 23"
8	Giuseppe Petito (ITA)	Gis Gelati	+ 23"
9	Rolf Sørensen (DEN)	Murella–Fanini	+ 23"
10	Jean-Philippe Vandenbrande (BEL)	Hitachi–Marc	+ 23"
