= 1984 Paris–Nice =

Race details
- Dates: 7–14 March 1984
- Stages: 7 + Prologue
- Distance: 1,123.4 km (698.0 mi)
- Winning time: 29h 41' 50"

Results
Jersey awarded to the overall winner	Winner	Sean Kelly (IRL)	(Skil–Reydel–Sem–Mavic)
	Second	Stephen Roche (IRL)	(La Redoute)
	Third	Bernard Hinault (FRA)	(La Vie Claire)

The 1984 Paris–Nice was the 42nd edition of the Paris–Nice cycle race and was held from 7 March to 14 March 1984. The race started in Issy-les-Moulineaux and finished at the Col d'Èze. The race was won by Sean Kelly of the Skil team.

== Route ==
Stage characteristics and winners
Stage	Date	Course	Distance	Type	Winner
P	7 March	Issy-les-Moulineaux	4.9 km (3.0 mi)	Individual time trial	Bert Oosterbosch (NED)
1	8 March	Avallon to Chalon-sur-Saône	172 km (107 mi)		Eddy Planckaert (BEL)
2a	9 March	Chalon to Bourbon-Lancy	101 km (63 mi)		Sean Kelly (IRL)
2b	9 March	Moulins	34 km (21 mi)	Team time trial	Panasonic–Raleigh
3	10 March	Moulins to Saint-Étienne	190 km (120 mi)		Noël Dejonckheere (BEL)
4a	11 March	Orange to Mont Ventoux	64 km (40 mi)		Éric Caritoux (FRA)
4b	11 March	Sault to Miramas	96 km (60 mi)		Francis Castaing (FRA)
5	12 March	Miramas to La Seyne-sur-Mer	174.5 km (108.4 mi)		Eddy Planckaert (BEL)
6	13 March	La Seyne to Mandelieu	182 km (113 mi)		Stephen Roche (IRL)
7a	14 March	Mandelieu to Nice	94 km (58 mi)		Bert Oosterbosch (NED)
7b	14 March	Col d'Èze	11 km (6.8 mi)	Individual time trial	Sean Kelly (IRL)

== General classification ==
Final general classification

Rank	Rider	Team	Time
1	Sean Kelly (IRL)	Skil–Reydel–Sem–Mavic	29h 41' 50"
2	Stephen Roche (IRL)	La Redoute	+ 12"
3	Bernard Hinault (FRA)	La Vie Claire	+ 1' 46"
4	Michel Laurent (FRA)	COOP–Hoonved	+ 2' 35"
5	Phil Anderson (AUS)	Panasonic–Raleigh	+ 2' 53"
6	Robert Millar (GBR)	Peugeot–Shell–Michelin	+ 3' 39"
7	Frédéric Vichot (FRA)	Skil–Reydel–Sem–Mavic	+ 3' 52"
8	Éric Caritoux (FRA)	Skil–Reydel–Sem–Mavic	+ 4' 01"
9	Steven Rooks (NED)	Panasonic–Raleigh	+ 4' 11"
10	Jean-Claude Bagot (FRA)	Skil–Reydel–Sem–Mavic	+ 4' 33"
