= 1991 Giro di Lombardia =

Race details
- Dates: 19 October 1991
- Stages: 1
- Distance: 243 km (151.0 mi)
- Winning time: 6h 10' 38"

Results
	Winner	Sean Kelly (IRL)	(PDM–Concorde–Ultima)
	Second	Martial Gayant (FRA)	(Toshiba)
	Third	Franco Ballerini (ITA)	(Del Tongo–MG Boys)

The 1991 Giro di Lombardia was the 85th edition of the Giro di Lombardia cycle race and was held on 19 October 1991. The race started and finished in Monza. The race was won by Sean Kelly of the PDM team.

== General classification ==
Final general classification

Rank	Rider	Team	Time
1	Sean Kelly (IRL)	PDM–Concorde–Ultima	6h 10' 38"
2	Martial Gayant (FRA)	Toshiba	+ 0"
3	Franco Ballerini (ITA)	Del Tongo–MG Boys	+ 35"
4	Bruno Cornillet (FRA)	Z	+ 35"
5	Rolf Sørensen (DEN)	Ariostea	+ 2' 09"
6	Alberto Volpi (ITA)	Chateau d'Ax–Gatorade	+ 2' 09"
7	Dante Rezze (FRA)	RMO	+ 2' 09"
8	Laurent Jalabert (FRA)	Toshiba	+ 2' 19"
9	Sammie Moreels (BEL)	Lotto	+ 2' 19"
10	Marco Vitali (ITA)	Jolly Componibili–Club 88	+ 2' 19"
