= 1982 Paris–Nice =

Race details
- Dates: 11–18 March 1982
- Stages: 7 + Prologue
- Distance: 1,186 km (736.9 mi)
- Winning time: 32h 03' 21"

Results
Jersey awarded to the overall winner	Winner	Sean Kelly (IRL)	(Sem–France Loire–Campagnolo)
	Second	Gilbert Duclos-Lassalle (FRA)	(Peugeot–Shell–Michelin)
	Third	Jean-Luc Vandenbroucke (BEL)	(La Redoute–Motobécane)

The 1982 Paris–Nice was the 40th edition of the Paris–Nice cycle race and was held from 11 March to 18 March 1982. The race started in Luingne and finished at the Col d'Èze. The race was won by Sean Kelly of the Sem–France Loire team.

== Route ==
Stage characteristics and winners
Stage	Date	Course	Distance	Type	Winner
P	11 March	Luingne	5.7 km (3.5 mi)	Individual time trial	Bert Oosterbosch (NED)
1	12 March	Châlons-sur-Marne to Montereau	194.5 km (120.9 mi)		Jean-François Chaurin (FRA)
2	13 March	Avallon to Montluçon	214.5 km (133.3 mi)		Sven-Åke Nilsson (SWE)
3	14 March	Vichy to Saint-Étienne	182 km (113 mi)		Sean Kelly (IRL)
4	15 March	Montélimar to Miramas	175 km (109 mi)		Adri van der Poel (NED)
5	16 March	Miramas to La Seyne-sur-Mer	158 km (98 mi)		Sean Kelly (IRL)
6	17 March	La Seyne-sur-Mer to La-Napoule	185 km (115 mi)		Pierre Bazzo (FRA)
7a	18 March	Mandelieu to Nice	60.3 km (37.5 mi)		Sean Kelly (IRL)
7b	18 March	Nice/Col d'Èze	11 km (6.8 mi)	Individual time trial	Sean Kelly (IRL)

== General classification ==
Final general classification

Rank	Rider	Team	Time
1	Sean Kelly (IRL)	Sem–France Loire–Campagnolo	32h 03' 21"
2	Gilbert Duclos-Lassalle (FRA)	Peugeot–Shell–Michelin	+ 40"
3	Jean-Luc Vandenbroucke (BEL)	La Redoute–Motobécane	+ 1' 12"
4	Bert Oosterbosch (NED)	DAF Trucks–TeVe Blad	+ 1' 23"
5	Claude Criquielion (BEL)	Splendor–Wickes Bouwmarkt	+ 2' 05"
6	Stephen Roche (IRL)	Peugeot–Shell–Michelin	+ 2' 15"
7	Hennie Kuiper (NED)	DAF Trucks–TeVe Blad	+ 2' 49"
8	Alberto Fernández (ESP)	Teka	+ 2' 50"
9	Michel Laurent (FRA)	Peugeot–Shell–Michelin	+ 3' 21"
10	Serge Beucherie (FRA)	Sem–France Loire–Campagnolo	+ 4' 34"
