= 1984 Paris–Roubaix =

Race details
- Dates: April 8, 1984
- Stages: 1
- Distance: 265.5 km (165.0 mi)
- Winning time: 7h 31' 35"

Results
| | Winner | Sean Kelly (IRL) | (Skil-Sem) |
| | Second | Rudy Rogiers (BEL) | (Splendor) |
| | Third | Alain Bondue (FRA) | (La Redoute) |

The 1984 Paris–Roubaix was undertaken in extremely muddy conditions, reducing the speed of the riders and making the race even harder than usual.

The race was characterised by a great deal of action early on, but the deciding move came with 45 kilometres to go. At this point Sean Kelly went after two La Redoute riders who were out in front, Gregor Braun and Alain Bondue. Rudy Rogiers came up to Kelly and they chased and caught the La Redoute pair. Braun was soon dropped and Bondue then crashed, and despite chasing hard, could not regain contact with the front two. At the finish on the Roubaix velodrome, Rogiers had no chance against the dominant Kelly who easily won the sprint for his first Paris–Roubaix win.

This win came in the middle of an amazing stretch of results for Kelly who later described this period in the first half of 1984 as the best of his career.

Below, the results for the 1984 edition of the Paris–Roubaix cycling classic.

== Results ==
=== 1984: Paris–Roubaix, 265 km. ===
| | Cyclist | Team | Time |
|---|---|---|---|
| 1 | Sean Kelly (IRE) | Skil | 7h 31'35" |
| 2 | Rudy Rogiers (BEL) | Splendor | s.t. |
| 3 | Alain Bondue (FRA) | La Redoute | at 0'36 |
| 4 | Johan van der Velde (NED) | Metauro Mobili | at 4'33 |
| 5 | Gregor Braun (GER) | La Redoute | at 4'33 |
| 6 | Jean-Luc Vandenbroucke (BEL) | La Redoute | at 6'16 |
| 7 | Jacques Hanegraaf (NED) | Kwantum | at 6'16 |
| 8 | Patrick Versluys (BEL) | | at 6'16 |
| 9 | Hennie Kuiper (NED) | Kwantum | at 6'16 |
| 10 | Rudy Matthijs (BEL) | | at 8'28 |
