= 1984 Grand Prix d'Automne =

Race details
- Dates: 7 October 1984
- Stages: 1
- Distance: 249 km (154.7 mi)
- Winning time: 6h 00' 46"

Results
| | Winner | Sean Kelly (IRL) |
| | Second | Steven Rooks (NED) |
| | Third | Bruno Wojtinek (FRA) |

The 1984 Grand Prix d'Automne was the 78th edition of the Paris–Tours cycle race and was held on 7 October 1984. The race started in Blois and finished in Chaville. The race was won by Sean Kelly.

== General classification ==
Final general classification

| Rank | Rider | Time |
|---|---|---|
| 1 | Sean Kelly (IRL) | 6h 00' 46" |
| 2 | Steven Rooks (NED) | + 0" |
| 3 | Bruno Wojtinek (FRA) | + 0" |
| 4 | Pierino Gavazzi (ITA) | + 0" |
| 5 | Phil Anderson (AUS) | + 0" |
| 6 | Gilbert Duclos-Lassalle (FRA) | + 0" |
| 7 | Etienne De Wilde (BEL) | + 0" |
| 8 | Éric Caritoux (FRA) | + 0" |
| 9 | Jean-Luc Vandenbroucke (BEL) | + 0" |
| 10 | Dag Erik Pedersen (NOR) | + 0" |
