= Bruno Wojtinek =

French cyclist

Personal information
- Born: 6 March 1963 (age 63) Valenciennes, France

Cycling career
- Sport: Cycling
- Current team: Retired
- Discipline: Road
- Role: Rider
- Rider type: Sprinter

Amateur team
- Olympique Grande-Synthe

Professional teams
- 1984–1985: Renault–Elf
- 1986: Peugeot–Shell
- 1987–1988: Vétements Z–Peugeot
- 1989: Super U–Raleigh–Fiat

Bruno Wojtinek (born 6 March 1963) is a French former professional racing cyclist. He rode in the 1987 Tour de France.

== Major results ==
1981
1st Overall Tour de l'Abitibi
1983
1st Circuit du Port de Dunkerque
2nd Paris–Roubaix Espoirs
1984
1st GP de la Ville de Rennes
3rd Paris–Tours
1985
1st Overall Tour d'Armorique

1st Stage 1

Settimana Internazionale di Coppi e Bartali

1st Stages 2 & 5

1st Stage 2a Tour de Luxembourg
2nd Overall 4 Jours de Dunkerque
2nd Paris–Roubaix
3rd Chanteloup-les-Vignes
5th Brabantse Pijl
1986
Paris–Nice

1st Stages 1 & 2

4 Jours de Dunkerque

1st Stages 2 & 3

Tour de Picardie

1st Prologue & Stage 1

1st Stage 4a Critérium du Dauphiné Libéré
1st Stage 5 Route du Sud
1st Stage 3 Tour of Sweden
1st Stage 4 Tour de la Communauté Européenne
1st GP de Denain Porte du Hainaut
5th Milan–San Remo
7th Rund um den Henninger Turm
1987
Route du Sud

1st Prologue & Stage 1

1st Stage 3a Critérium du Dauphiné Libéré
1st Stage 3 Tour du Limousin
1st GP de Denain Porte du Hainaut
5th Overall 4 Jours de Dunkerque
6th Paris–Roubaix
1988
1st Prologue Tour Méditerranéen
3rd Grand Prix de Cannes
