= 1987 Paris–Nice =

Race details
- Dates: 8–15 March 1987
- Stages: 7 + Prologue
- Distance: 1,169.5 km (726.7 mi)
- Winning time: 31h 18' 46"

Results
Jersey awarded to the overall winner	Winner	Sean Kelly (IRL)	(Kas)
	Second	Jean-François Bernard (FRA)	(Toshiba–Look)
	Third	Laurent Fignon (FRA)	(Système U)

The 1987 Paris–Nice was the 45th edition of the Paris–Nice cycle race and was held from 3 March to 9 March 1987. The race started in Paris and finished at the Col d'Èze. The race was won by Sean Kelly of the Kas team.

== Route ==
Stage characteristics and winners
Stage	Date	Course	Distance	Type	Winner
P	8 March	Paris	5.5 km (3.4 mi)	Individual time trial	Jean-Luc Vandenbroucke (BEL)
1	9 March	Champigny-sur-Yonne	47 km (29 mi)	Team time trial	Carrera Jeans–Vagabond
2	10 March	Chalon-sur-Saône to Saint-Étienne	203 km (126 mi)		Eddy Planckaert (BEL)
3	11 March	Saint-Étienne to Mont Ventoux/Chalet Reynard	244 km (152 mi)		Sean Kelly (IRL)
4	12 March	Miramas to Toulon/Mont Faron	193 km (120 mi)		Jean-François Bernard (FRA)
5	13 March	Toulon to Saint-Tropez	208 km (129 mi)		Laurent Fignon (FRA)
6	14 March	Saint-Tropez to Mandelieu	155 km (96 mi)		Jean-Claude Bagot (FRA)
7a	15 March	Mandelieu to Nice	104 km (65 mi)		Laurent Fignon (FRA)
7b	15 March	Nice to Col d'Èze	10 km (6.2 mi)	Individual time trial	Stephen Roche (IRL)

== General classification ==
Final general classification

Rank	Rider	Team	Time
1	Sean Kelly (IRL)	Kas	31h 18' 46"
2	Jean-François Bernard (FRA)	Toshiba–Look	+ 1' 07"
3	Laurent Fignon (FRA)	Système U	+ 1' 10"
4	Stephen Roche (IRL)	Carrera Jeans–Vagabond	+ 1' 17"
5	Éric Boyer (FRA)	Système U	+ 2' 01"
6	Jean-Claude Bagot (FRA)	Fagor–MBK	+ 3' 49"
7	Ronan Pensec (FRA)	Vétements Z–Peugeot	+ 4' 59"
8	Urs Zimmermann (SUI)	Carrera Jeans–Vagabond	+ 5' 38"
9	Iñaki Gastón (ESP)	Kas	+ 6' 27"
10	Claude Criquielion (BEL)	Hitachi–Marc	+ 6' 45"
