= 1986 Paris–Roubaix =

Race details
- Dates: 13 April 1986
- Stages: 1
- Distance: 268 km (166.5 mi)
- Winning time: 6h 48' 23"

Results
	Winner	Sean Kelly (IRL)	(KAS)
	Second	Rudy Dhaenens (BEL)	(Hitachi)
	Third	Adrie van der Poel (NED)	(Kwantum Hallen-Decosol-Yoko)

The 1986 Paris–Roubaix was the 84th edition of the cycling classic Paris–Roubaix and was held on 13 April.

Sean Kelly won his second Paris–Roubaix after his 1984 victory. He used his deadly finish to come out on top in the final. Four riders approached the finish in the towncentre of Roubaix together: Ferdi Van Den Haute, Adri van der Poel, Rudy Dhaenens and Sean Kelly. Van Den Haute started the sprint from far away, hoping that the rest was too tired at this point in the race. Kelly, having just finished second to van der Poel in the Tour of Flanders, let the Dutch rider chase down Van Den Haute, before blazing past both Van Der Poel and Rudy Dhaenens for the win.

== Results ==
	Cyclist	Team	Time
1	Sean Kelly (IRE)	Kas	6h 48'23"
2	Rudy Dhaenens (BEL)	Hitachi	at 0'01
3	Adri van der Poel (NED)	Kwantum	s.t.
4	Ferdi Van Den Haute (BEL)	Skala	at 0'02
5	Ludo Peeters (BEL)		at 1'29
6	Johan van der Velde (NED)		s.t.
7	Marc Sergeant (BEL)		s.t.
8	Francesco Moser (ITA)		s.t.
9	Patrick Versluys (BEL)		s.t.
10	Nico Verhoeven (NED)		s.t.
