= Patrick Versluys =

Belgian cyclist

Personal information
- Born: 5 September 1958 (age 68) Eeklo, Belgium

Cycling career
- Sport: Cycling
- Current team: Retired
- Discipline: Road
- Role: Rider

Professional teams
- 1980–1982: Boule d'Or–Studio Casa
- 1983–1985: Splendor–Euro Shop
- 1986: Fangio–Lois–Mavic
- 1987: AD Renting–Fangio–IOC–MBK
- 1988: Intral Renting–Nec–Ricoh–Merckx

Patrick Versluys (born 5 September 1958) is a Belgian former professional racing cyclist. He rode in two editions of the Tour de France.

== Major results ==
1980
4th Circuit des Frontières
1981
1st Kampioenschap van Vlaanderen
3rd Grand Prix de Wallonie
3rd Le Samyn
3rd Omloop van het Leiedal
5th GP Stad Zottegem
10th GP de Fourmies
4th Grote Prijs Jef Scherens
1982
1st Leeuwse Pijl
7th Tour of Flanders
8th Milan–San Remo
1983
1st Omloop van het Leiedal
3rd Grand Prix Impanis-Van Petegem
6th Brabantse Pijl
7th Paris–Roubaix
8th Overall Driedaagse van De Panne-Koksijde
10th Circuit des Frontières
1984
2nd Nokere Koerse
3rd Amstel Gold Race
6th Brussels–Ingooigem
6th Brabantse Pijl
8th Paris–Roubaix
8th Overall Tour de Luxembourg
1985
1st Grand Prix de Denain
2nd Nokere Koerse
4th Amstel Gold Race
8th E3 Harelbeke
1986
1st De Kustpijl
3rd Grand Prix de Wallonie
4th E3 Harelbeke
5th Le Samyn
6th Binche–Tournai–Binche
9th Paris–Roubaix
1987
2nd Paris–Roubaix
1988
1st Nokere Koerse
