= 1986 Paris–Nice =

Race details
- Dates: 2–9 March 1986
- Stages: 7 + Prologue
- Distance: 1,217.4 km (756.5 mi)
- Winning time: 33h 12' 21"

Results
Jersey awarded to the overall winner	Winner	Sean Kelly (IRL)	(Kas)
	Second	Urs Zimmermann (SUI)	(Carrera–Inoxpran)
	Third	Greg LeMond (USA)	(La Vie Claire)

The 1986 Paris–Nice was the 44th edition of the Paris–Nice road cycling stage race and was held from 2 March to 9 March 1986. The race started in Paris and finished at the Col d'Èze. The race was won by Sean Kelly of the Kas team.

== Route ==
Stage characteristics and winners
Stage	Date	Course	Distance	Type	Winner
P	2 March	Paris	5.9 km (3.7 mi)	Individual time trial	Sean Kelly (IRL)
1	3 March	Limeil-Brévannes to Limeil-Brévannes	148 km (92 mi)		Bruno Wojtinek (FRA)
2	4 March	Buxy to Saint-Étienne	223 km (139 mi)		Bruno Wojtinek (FRA)
3	5 March	Saint-Étienne to Domaine du Rouret	206 km (128 mi)		Sean Kelly (IRL)
4a	6 March	Le Rouret to Mont Ventoux/Chalet Reynard	118 km (73 mi)		Eric Van Lancker (BEL)
4b	6 March	Carpentras to Avignon	31.5 km (19.6 mi)	Team time trial	Peugeot–Shell
5	7 March	Salon-de-Provence to Mont Faron	180 km (110 mi)		Pedro Muñoz (ESP)
6	8 March	Toulon to Mandelieu-la-Napoule	194 km (121 mi)		Jørg Pedersen (DEN)
7a	9 March	Mandelieu-la-Napoule to Nice	101 km (63 mi)		Alfonso Gutiérrez (ESP)
7b	9 March	Nice to Col d'Èze	10 km (6.2 mi)	Individual time trial	Sean Kelly (IRL)

== General classification ==
Final general classification

Rank	Rider	Team	Time
1	Sean Kelly (IRL)	Kas	33h 12' 21"
2	Urs Zimmermann (SUI)	Carrera–Inoxpran	+ 1' 50"
3	Greg LeMond (USA)	La Vie Claire	+ 2' 27"
4	Pascal Simon (FRA)	Peugeot–Shell	+ 2' 44"
5	Éric Caritoux (FRA)	Fagor	+ 2' 59"
6	Iñaki Gastón (ESP)	Kas	+ 3' 21"
7	Jean-François Bernard (FRA)	La Vie Claire	+ 3' 23"
8	Yvon Madiot (FRA)	Système U	+ 4' 14"
9	Charly Mottet (FRA)	Système U	+ 4' 37"
10	Eddy Schepers (BEL)	Carrera–Inoxpran	+ 5' 03"
