= 1987 Critérium du Dauphiné Libéré =

Race details
- Dates: 25 May – 2 June 1987
- Stages: 8 + Prologue
- Distance: 1,283 km (797 mi)
- Winning time: 34h 30' 25"

Results
Jersey awarded to the overall winner	Winner	Charly Mottet (FRA)	(Système U)
	Second	Henry Cárdenas (COL)	(Café de Colombia–Varta)
	Third	Ronan Pensec (FRA)	(Vétements Z–Peugeot)
Jersey awarded to the points classification winner	Points	Thierry Claveyrolat (FRA)	(RMO–Cycles Méral–Mavic)
Jersey awarded to the mountains classification winner	Mountains	Henry Cardenas (COL)	(Café de Colombia–Varta)
	Combination	Thierry Claveyrolat (FRA)	(RMO–Cycles Méral–Mavic)
	Team	Vétements Z–Peugeot	

The 1987 Critérium du Dauphiné Libéré was the 39th edition of the cycle race and was held from 25 May to 2 June 1987. The race started in Grenoble and finished in Carpentras. The race was won by Charly Mottet of the Système U team.

== Teams ==
Fifteen teams, containing a total of 131 riders, participated in the race:

- Carrera Jeans–Vagabond
- Vétements Z–Peugeot
- Superconfex–Kwantum–Yoko–Colnago
- Fagor–MBK
- Kas
- RMO–Cycles Méral–Mavic
- Toshiba–Look
- Café de Colombia–Varta
- Système U
- AD Renting–Fangio–IOC–MBK
- Teka
- Colombia amateur team
- Poland amateur team
- Czechoslovakia amateur team
- Italy amateur team

== Route ==
Stage characteristics and winners
Stage	Date	Course	Distance	Type	Winner
P	25 May	Grenoble	3 km (1.9 mi)	Individual time trial	Erich Maechler (SUI)
1	26 May	Grenoble to Ferney-Voltaire	202 km (126 mi)		Laurent Biondi (FRA)
2	27 May	Bellegarde to Saint-Étienne	195 km (121 mi)		Bruno Cornillet (FRA)
3	28 May	Saint-Étienne to Valence	110 km (68 mi)		Bruno Wojtinek (FRA)
4	29 May	Valence	32 km (20 mi)	Individual time trial	Erich Maechler (SUI)
5	30 May	Chambéry to Lyon	202 km (126 mi)		Niki Rüttimann (SUI)
6	31 May	Chambéry to Valfréjus	183 km (114 mi)		Henry Cárdenas (COL)
7	1 June	Bardonecchia to Bardonecchia	163 km (101 mi)		Thierry Claveyrolat (FRA)
8	2 June	Sisteron to Carpentras	193 km (120 mi)		Roy Knickman (USA)

== General classification ==
Final general classification

Rank	Rider	Team	Time
1	Charly Mottet (FRA)	Système U	34h 30' 25"
2	Henry Cárdenas (COL)	Café de Colombia–Varta	+ 2' 44"
3	Ronan Pensec (FRA)	Vétements Z–Peugeot	+ 3' 32"
4	Thierry Claveyrolat (FRA)	RMO–Cycles Méral–Mavic	+ 3' 54"
5	Bruno Cornillet (FRA)	Vétements Z–Peugeot	+ 5' 17"
6	Bernard Vallet (FRA)	RMO–Cycles Méral–Mavic	+ 5' 30"
7	Régis Simon (FRA)	RMO–Cycles Méral–Mavic	+ 5' 50"
8	Luc Leblanc (FRA)	Toshiba–Look	+ 6' 02"
9	Eduardo Chozas (ESP)	Teka	+ 7' 56"
10	Pascal Simon (FRA)	Vétements Z–Peugeot	+ 8' 23"
