= 1988 Tour of the Basque Country =

Race details
- Dates: 4–8 April 1988
- Stages: 5
- Distance: 852.8 km (529.9 mi)
- Winning time: 21h 11' 16"

Results
	Winner	Erik Breukink (NED)	(Panasonic–Isostar–Colnago–Agu)
	Second	Luc Suykerbuyk (NED)	(Zahor Chocolates)
	Third	Julián Gorospe (ESP)	(Reynolds)

The 1988 Tour of the Basque Country was the 28th edition of the Tour of the Basque Country cycle race and was held from 4 April to 8 April 1988. The race started in Beasain and finished in Otzaurte. The race was won by Erik Breukink of the Panasonic team.

== General classification ==
Final general classification

Rank	Rider	Team	Time
1	Erik Breukink (NED)	Panasonic–Isostar–Colnago–Agu	21h 11' 16"
2	Luc Suykerbuyk (NED)	Zahor Chocolates	+ 24"
3	Julián Gorospe (ESP)	Reynolds	+ 26"
4	Marino Lejarreta (ESP)	Caja Rural–Orbea	+ 1' 18"
5	Álvaro Pino (ESP)	BH	+ 1' 27"
6	Pedro Delgado (ESP)	Reynolds	+ 1' 40"
7	Pedro Muñoz (ESP)	Fagor–MBK	+ 1' 58"
8	Anselmo Fuerte (ESP)	BH	+ 2' 23"
9	Jean-Claude Bagot (FRA)	Fagor–MBK	+ 3' 57"
10	Acácio da Silva (POR)	Kas–Canal 10	+ 4' 30"
