= 1984 Amstel Gold Race =

Dutch cycling race

The 1984 Amstel Gold Race was the 19th edition of the annual Amstel Gold Race road bicycle race, held on Sunday April 21, 1984, in the Dutch province of Limburg. The race stretched 247 kilometres, with the start in Heerlen and the finish in Meerssen. There were a total of 144 competitors, and 55 cyclists finished the race.

== Result ==
Final result (1–10)
Rank	Rider	Time
1	Jacques Hanegraaf (NED)	6h 05' 56"
2	Kim Andersen (DEN)	+ 2' 04"
3	Patrick Versluys (BEL)	+ 2' 08"
4	Rudy Dhaenens (BEL)	+ 2' 08"
5	Ad Wijnands (NED)	+ 2' 08"
6	William Tackaert (BEL)	+ 2' 08"
7	Frédéric Vichot (FRA)	+ 2' 08"
8	Jacques van Meer (NED)	+ 2' 08"
9	Theo de Rooij (NED)	+ 2' 08"
10	Peter Winnen (NED)	+ 2' 08"
