= 1986 Critérium du Dauphiné Libéré =

Race details
- Dates: 25 May – 1 June 1986
- Stages: 7 + Prologue
- Distance: 1,288 km (800 mi)
- Winning time: 34h 16' 28"

Results
Jersey awarded to the overall winner	Winner	Urs Zimmermann (SUI)	(Carrera Jeans–Vagabond)
	Second	Ronan Pensec (FRA)	(Peugeot–Shell)
	Third	Joop Zoetemelk (NED)	(Kwantum–Decosol–Yoko)
Jersey awarded to the points classification winner	Points	Jean-Claude Leclercq (FRA)	(Kas)
Jersey awarded to the mountains classification winner	Mountains	Thierry Claveyrolat (FRA)	(RMO–Cycles Méral–Mavic)

The 1986 Critérium du Dauphiné Libéré was the 38th edition of the cycle race and was held from 25 May to 1 June 1986. The race started in Annecy and finished in Nyons. The race was won by Urs Zimmermann of the Carrera team.

== Teams ==
Thirteen teams, containing a total of 113 riders, participated in the race:

- Fagor
- La Vie Claire
- Café de Colombia–Varta
- Kas
- Peugeot–Shell
- Teka
- Miko
- RMO–Cycles Méral–Mavic
- Système U
- Hitachi–Marc
- Kwantum–Decosol–Yoko
- Carrera Jeans–Vagabond
- Colombia amateur team

== Route ==
Stage characteristics and winners
Stage	Date	Course	Distance	Type	Winner
P	25 May	Annecy	4.1 km (2.5 mi)	Individual time trial	Jean-François Bernard (FRA)
1	26 May	Annecy to Villeurbanne	176 km (109 mi)		Hans Daams (NED)
2	27 May	Belleville to Gueugnon	186 km (116 mi)		Laurent Fignon (FRA)
3	28 May	Digoin to Saint-Étienne	195 km (121 mi)		Thierry Claveyrolat (FRA)
4a	29 May	Saint-Chamond to Charavines	100 km (62 mi)		Bruno Wojtinek (FRA)
4b	29 May	Chambéry to Chambéry	94 km (58 mi)		Luc Roosen (BEL)
5	30 May	Chambéry to Albertville	184 km (114 mi)		Erich Maechler (SUI)
6	31 May	Grenoble to Grenoble	207 km (129 mi)		Thierry Claveyrolat (FRA)
7a	1 June	Laragne to Camaret	106 km (66 mi)		Maarten Ducrot (NED)
7b	1 June	Camaret to Nyons	35.9 km (22.3 mi)	Individual time trial	Jean-François Bernard (FRA)

== General classification ==
Final general classification

Rank	Rider	Team	Time
1	Urs Zimmermann (SUI)	Carrera Jeans–Vagabond	34h 16' 28"
2	Ronan Pensec (FRA)	Peugeot–Shell	+ 3' 15"
3	Joop Zoetemelk (NED)	Kwantum–Decosol–Yoko	+ 3' 44"
4	Jean-Claude Bagot (FRA)	Fagor	+ 3' 46"
5	Jean-Claude Leclercq (FRA)	Kas	+ 3' 58"
6	Thierry Claveyrolat (FRA)	RMO–Cycles Méral–Mavic	+ 5' 07"
7	Jean-François Bernard (FRA)	La Vie Claire	+ 5' 12"
8	Luc Roosen (BEL)	Kwantum–Decosol–Yoko	+ 5' 25"
9	Éric Caritoux (FRA)	Fagor	+ 7' 06"
10	Charly Bérard (FRA)	La Vie Claire	+ 9' 22"
