= 1985 Amstel Gold Race =

Dutch cycling race

The 1985 Amstel Gold Race was the 20th edition of the annual Amstel Gold Race road bicycle race, held on Sunday April 27, 1985, in the Dutch province of Limburg. The race stretched 242 kilometres, with the start in Heerlen and the finish in Meerssen. There were a total of 146 competitors, and 25 cyclists finished the race.

== Result ==
Final result (1–10)
Rank	Rider	Time
1	Gerrie Knetemann (NED)	6h 27' 45"
2	Jef Lieckens (BEL)	+ 32"
3	Johnny Broers (NED)	+ 32"
4	Patrick Versluys (BEL)	+ 59"
5	Phil Anderson (AUS)	+ 1' 22"
6	Nico Verhoeven (NED)	+ 1' 22"
7	Ludo Peeters (BEL)	+ 1' 22"
8	Claude Criquielion (BEL)	+ 2' 46"
9	Johan Lammerts (NED)	+ 2' 46"
10	Marc Sergeant (BEL)	+ 4' 04"
