= 1987 Paris–Roubaix =

Race details
- Dates: April 12, 1987
- Stages: 1
- Distance: 264 km (164.0 mi)
- Winning time: 7h 18' 03"

Results
| | Winner | Eric Vanderaerden (BEL) | (Panasonic–Isostar) |
| | Second | Patrick Versluys (BEL) | (AD Renting–Fangio–IOC–MBK) |
| | Third | Rudy Dhaenens (BEL) | (Hitachi–Marc) |

The 1987 Paris–Roubaix was the 85th running of the Paris–Roubaix single-day cycling race. It was held on 12 April 1987 over a distance of 264 kilometres (164.0 miles). The race was won by Belgian Eric Vanderaerden.

== Results ==
| # | Name | Team | Time |
|---|---|---|---|
| 1 | Eric Vanderaerden (BEL) | Panasonic–Isostar | 7h 18' 03" |
| 2 | Patrick Versluys (BEL) | AD Renting–Fangio–IOC–MBK | 0" |
| 3 | Rudy Dhaenens (BEL) | Hitachi–Marc | 0" |
| 4 | Jean-Philippe Vandenbrande (BEL) | Hitachi–Marc | 0' 2" |
| 5 | Edwig Van Hooydonck (BEL) | Superconfex–Kwantum–Yoko–Colnago | 1' 54" |
| 6 | Bruno Wojtinek (FRA) | Vétements Z–Peugeot | 2' 37" |
| 7 | Marc Sergeant (BEL) | Lotto–Merckx | 2' 37" |
| 8 | Nico Verhoeven (NED) | Superconfex–Kwantum–Yoko–Colnago] | 2' 37" |
| 9 | Bruno Leali (ITA) | Carrera Jeans–Vagabond | 2' 37" |
| 10 | Martial Gayant (FRA) | Système U | 3' 04" |
