= Johnny Broers =

Dutch cyclist

Personal information
- Born: 9 April 1959 (age 67) Maartensdijk, Netherlands

Cycling career
- Sport: Cycling
- Current team: Retired
- Discipline: Road
- Role: Rider

Professional teams
- 1981–1982: Splendor–Wickes Bouwmarkt–Europ Decor
- 1982: B & S Wegenbouw–Elro Snacks
- 1983: Beckers Snacks–Bicky Burger
- 1984: AVP–Viditel–Concorde
- 1985–1986: Skala–Gazelle
- 1988: Caja Rural–Orbea

Johnny Broers (born 9 April 1959) is a Dutch former professional racing cyclist. He rode in two editions of the Tour de France.

== Major results ==
1979
1st Ronde van Zuid-Holland
2nd Grand Prix de France
3rd Acht van Chaam
1980
1st Omloop Het Nieuwsblad U23
1st Stage 7b (ITT) Olympia's Tour
3rd Overall Rheinland-Pfalz-Rundfahrt
1981
3rd Brabantse Pijl
4th Circuit des Frontières
1982
5th Brussel–Ingooigem
1983
2nd Overall Ronde van Nederland
3rd Overall Tour Européen Lorraine-Alsace
1984
10th Overall Ronde van Nederland
1985
3rd Amstel Gold Race
10th Overall Ronde van Nederland
1987
1st Ronde van Midden-Nederland
2nd Seraing–Aachen–Seraing
3rd Hel van het Mergelland
