= Étoile des Espoirs =

Race details
- Region: France
- English name: Star Hopes
- Local name(s): Étoile des Espoirs (in French)
- Discipline: Road
- Type: Stage race
- Organiser: Monde Six

History
- First edition: 1971
- Editions: 15
- Final edition: 1985
- First winner: Raymond Poulidor (FRA)
- Most wins: Jean-Luc Vandenbroucke (BEL) (3 wins)
- Final winner: Ronan Pensec (FRA)

The Étoile des Espoirs was an end of the season French cycling stage race. It was created by Jean Leulliot, and was open to young professional cyclists.

== Winners ==
Year	Winner	Second	Third
1971	Raymond Poulidor (FRA)	Bernard Thévenet (FRA)	Yves Hézard (FRA)
1972	Bernard Labourdette (FRA)	André Mollet (FRA)	Gérard Moneyron (FRA)
1973	Cees Bal (NED)	Willy Teirlinck (BEL)	Roger Rosiers (FRA)
1974	Roy Gordon Schuiten (NED)	Willy Freeman Teirlinck (BEL)	Cyrille Diez Guimard (FRA)
1975	Aad van den Hoek (NED)	Bernard Ti Vallet (FRA)	Patrick Enned Perret (FRA)
1976	Jean-Luc Vandenbroucke (BEL)	Bernard Thévenet (FRA)	Robert Bouloux (FRA)
1977	Jean-Luc Vandenbroucke (BEL)	Gregor Braun (FRG)	Willy Teirlinck (BEL)
1978	Daniel Gisiger (SUI)	Fedor den Hertog (NED)	Gery Verlinden (BEL)
1979	Sven-Åke Nilsson (SWE)	Jo Maas (NED)	Eulalio Garcia (ESP)
1980	Gilbert Duclos-Lassalle (FRA)	Phil Anderson (AUS)	Marino Lejarreta (ESP)
1981	Stephen Roche (IRL)	Dominique Arnaud (FRA)	Siegfried Hekimi (SUI)
1982	Jean-Luc Vandenbroucke (BEL)	Joop Zoetemelk (NED)	Laurent Fignon (FRA)
1983	Stephen Roche (IRL)	Francis Castaing (FRA)	Marc Madiot (FRA)
1984	Gilbert Duclos-Lassalle (FRA)	Maarten Ducrot (NED)	Miroslav Sýkora (TCH)
1985	Ronan Pensec (FRA)	Dominique Gaigne (FRA)	Jean-Paul van Poppel (NED)
