= Jean-Marie Grezet =

Swiss racing cyclist

Personal information
- Born: 16 January 1959 (age 67) Le Locle, Switzerland

Cycling career
- Sport: Cycling
- Role: Rider

Jean-Marie Grezet (born 16 January 1959) is a Swiss former professional racing cyclist. He rode in three editions of the Tour de France and one edition of the Giro d'Italia.
