= List of wins by Reynolds and its successors =

This is a comprehensive list of victories of the Movistar Team cycling team. The races are categorized according to the UCI Continental Circuits rules.

== 1980 – Reynolds ==
Stage 16a Vuelta a España, Dominique Arnaud
Stage 3b Vuelta a los Valles Mineros, José Luis Laguía
Trofeo Masferrer, Juan Martín Ocaña

== 1981 – Reynolds ==
Vuelta a España Mountains classification, José Luis Laguía
Overall Vuelta a Burgos, José Luis Laguía

== 1982 – Reynolds ==
Overall Vuelta a Burgos, José Luis Laguía
Overall Tour of the Basque Country, José Luis Laguía
Spain Road Race Championships, José Luis Laguía
Stages 6, 9 & 11 Vuelta a España, José Luis Laguía
Stage 8 Vuelta a España, Jesús Hernández
Stage 15 Vuelta a España, Ángel Arroyo
Vuelta a España Mountains classification, José Luis Laguía

== 1983 – Reynolds ==
Overall Tour of the Basque Country, Julián Gorospe
Spain Road Race Championships, Carlos Hernández
Stage 15 Tour de France, Ángel Arroyo
Stage 14 Vuelta a España, Carlos Hernández
Stage 16 Vuelta a España, José Luis Laguía
Stage 18 Vuelta a España, Jesús Hernández
Vuelta a España Mountains classification, José Luis Laguía

== 1984 – Reynolds ==
Stage 19 Tour de France, Ángel Arroyo
Stages 14 & 18b Vuelta a España, Julián Gorospe
Vuelta a Andalucía, Julián Gorospe

== 1985 – Reynolds ==
Stage 15 Tour de France, Eduardo Chozas
Vuelta a España Mountains classification, José Luis Laguía

== 1986 – Reynolds ==
Vuelta a Murcia, Miguel Induráin
Tour de l'Avenir, Miguel Induráin
Stage 19 Tour de France, Julián Gorospe
Vuelta a España Mountains classification, José Luis Laguía

== 1988 – Reynolds ==
Overall Tour de France, Pedro Delgado
Stage 13, Pedro Delgado
Volta a Catalunya, Miguel Induráin

== 1989 – Reynolds ==
Overall Paris–Nice, Miguel Induráin
Overall Critérium International, Miguel Induráin
Stage 19 Tour de France, Miguel Induráin
Overall Vuelta a España, Pedro Delgado

== 1990 – Banesto ==
Overall Paris–Nice, Miguel Induráin
Overall Tour of the Basque Country, Julián Gorospe
Clásica de San Sebastián, Miguel Induráin
Stage 16 Tour de France, Miguel Induráin

== 1991 – Banesto ==
Overall Volta a Catalunya, Miguel Induráin
Overall Tour de France, Miguel Induráin

Team classification
Stage 8, Miguel Induráin
Stage 21, Miguel Induráin

== 1992 – Banesto ==
Overall Paris–Nice, Jean-François Bernard
Overall Critérium International, Jean-François Bernard
Overall Volta a Catalunya, Miguel Induráin
Overall Giro d'Italia, Miguel Induráin
Overall Tour de France, Miguel Induráin

Prologue, Stage 9 & 19, Miguel Induráin

== 1993 – Banesto ==
Overall Giro d'Italia, Miguel Induráin
Overall Tour de France, Miguel Induráin

Prologue & Stage 9, Miguel Induráin

== 1994 – Banesto ==
Overall Tour de France, Miguel Induráin

Stage 9, Miguel Induráin

Vuelta a España Team classification
World Time Trial Championship, Miguel Induráin

== 1995 – Banesto ==
Overall Critérium du Dauphiné Libéré, Miguel Induráin
Overall Tour de France, Miguel Induráin

Stage 8 & 19, Miguel Induráin

== 1996 – Banesto ==
Dauphiné Libéré, Miguel Induráin

== 1997 – Banesto ==
Stage 20 Tour de France, Abraham Olano
Vuelta a España Mountains classification, José María Jiménez

== 1998 – Banesto ==
Overall Dauphiné Libéré, Armand de Las Cuevas
Overall Vuelta a España, Abraham Olano

Mountains classification, José María Jiménez
Team classification

== 1999 – Banesto ==
Volta a Catalunya – Manuel Beltrán
Tour de France Team classification
Mountains classification Vuelta a España, José María Jiménez

Team classification

== 2000 – Banesto ==
Overall Volta a Catalunya José María Jiménez
Young rider classification Tour de France, Francisco Mancebo

Stage 18, José Vicente García

== 2001 – iBanesto.com ==
Points classification Vuelta a España, José María Jiménez

Mountains classification, José María Jiménez
Team classification

== 2002 – iBanesto.com ==
Overall Tour of the Basque Country, Aitor Osa
Vuelta a España Mountains classification, Aitor Osa

== 2003 – iBanesto.com ==
Young rider classification Tour de France, Denis Menchov

Stage 18, Pablo Lastras

Vuelta a España Team classification

== 2004 – Illes Balears–Banesto ==
Stage 1 Vuelta a la Comunitat Valenciana, Antonio Colom
Stage 2 Vuelta a Murcia, José Iván Gutiérrez
Stage 6 Paris–Nice, Denis Menchov
Stage 3 Setmana Catalana de Ciclisme, Isaac Gálvez
Overall Tour of the Basque Country, Denis Menchov

Stage 4, Denis Menchov

Stage 1 Vuelta a Aragón, Denis Menchov
Overall Vuelta a La Rioja, Vladimir Karpets
Vuelta a Castilla y León Stage 1, José Iván Gutiérrez
Vuelta a Castilla y León Stage 2, Team Time Trial
Stage 6 Deutschland Tour – Francisco Mancebo
Stage 1 Volta a Catalunya, Team Time Trial
Stage 7 Volta a Catalunya, Isaac Gálvez
Spain Road Race Championships, Francisco Mancebo
Spain Time Trial Championships, José Iván Gutiérrez
Tour de France Young rider classification, Vladimir Karpets
Stage 5 Vuelta a España, Denis Menchov

== 2005 – Illes Balears–Banesto / Illes Balears–Caisse d'Epargne ==
Trofeo Manacor, Alejandro Valverde
Trofeo Soller, Alejandro Valverde
Trofeo Calvià, Antonio Colom
Clásica de Almería, José Iván Gutiérrez
Stage 3 Paris–Nice, Vicente Reynés
Stage 7 Paris–Nice, Alejandro Valverde
Stage 1 Critérium International – Isaac Gálvez
Stages 3 & 4 Tour of the Basque Country, Alejandro Valverde
Stage 8 Tour de Suisse, Pablo Lastras
Spain Time Trial Championships, José Iván Gutiérrez
Stage 10 Tour de France, Alejandro Valverde
Clásica a los Puertos, Xabier Zandio
Stage 10 Vuelta a España, Francisco Mancebo

== 2006 – Caisse d'Epargne–Illes Balears ==
Trofeo Mallorca, Isaac Gálvez
Trofeo Alcudia, Isaac Gálvez
Stage 2 Tour Méditerranéen, José Iván Gutiérrez
Overall Volta a la Comunitat Valenciana, Antonio Colom

Stage 4, Antonio Colom

Clásica de Almería, Francisco Pérez
Stage 2 Vuelta a Murcia, Alejandro Valverde
Stage 3 Vuelta a Murcia, José Iván Gutiérrez
Stage 5 Paris–Nice, Joaquim Rodríguez
Stage 3 Vuelta a Castilla y León, José Vicente García
Stage 4 Vuelta a Castilla y León, Marco Fertonani
Stage 1 Tour of the Basque Country, Alejandro Valverde
Flèche Wallonne, Alejandro Valverde
Liège–Bastogne–Liège, Alejandro Valverde
Stage 1 Vuelta a La Rioja, Alexei Markov
Stage 4 Tour de Romandie, Alejandro Valverde
Stage 5 Four Days of Dunkirk, Isaac Gálvez
Stage 12 Giro d'Italia, Joan Horrach
Stage 5 Volta a Catalunya, David Arroyo
France Road Race Championships, Florent Brard
Overall Tour de France, Óscar Pereiro
Stages 3 & 5 Vuelta a Burgos, José Iván Gutiérrez
Stage 7 Vuelta a España, Alejandro Valverde
UCI ProTour GC, Alejandro Valverde

== 2007 – Caisse d'Epargne ==
Paris–Nice Team classification

Stage 6 – Luis León Sánchez

Tour de Suisse Team classification
Trofeo Cala Millor-Cala Bona, Vicente Reynés
Stage 1 Tour Méditerranéen, T.T.T. (Florent Brard, Vladimir Efimkin, Imanol Erviti, Marco Fertonani, José Vicente García, Iván Gutiérrez, Alexei Markov, Aitor Pérez)
Vuelta a Mallorca, Luis León Sánchez
Overall Volta a Catalunya, Vladimir Karpets

Stage 1, Team Time Trial

Overall Tour de Suisse GC, Vladimir Karpets
Overall Eneco Tour, Iván Gutiérrez
Vuelta a España Team classification

== 2008 – Caisse d'Epargne ==
Trofeo Pollença, José Joaquín Rojas
Overall Vuelta a Andalucía, Pablo Lastras
Stage 1 Vuelta a la Comunitat Valenciana, Iván Gutiérrez
Overall Vuelta a Murcia, Alejandro Valverde

Stage 4, Alejandro Valverde

Stage 3 Tirreno–Adriatico, Joaquim Rodríguez
Stage 7 Paris–Nice, Luis León Sánchez
Paris–Camembert, Alejandro Valverde
Liège–Bastogne–Liège, Alejandro Valverde
Stage 1 Euskal Bizikleta, Daniel Moreno
Overall Critérium du Dauphiné Libéré, Alejandro Valverde

Stages 1 & 3, Alejandro Valverde

Spain Road Race Championships, Alejandro Valverde
Spain Time Trial Championships, Luis León Sánchez
Stages 1 & 6 Tour de France, Alejandro Valverde
Stage 7 Tour de France, Luis León Sánchez
Prueba Villafranca de Ordizia, Vladimir Karpets
Clásica de San Sebastián, Alejandro Valverde
Subida a Urkiola, David Arroyo
Overall Eneco Tour, Iván Gutiérrez

Prologue, Iván Gutiérrez

Overall Vuelta a Burgos, Xabier Zandio
Stage 2 Vuelta a España, Alejandro Valverde
Stage 18 Vuelta a España, Imanol Erviti
Stage 19 Vuelta a España, David Arroyo
Overall UCI ProTour, Alejandro Valverde

Team classification

== 2009 – Caisse d'Epargne ==
Overall Tour Méditerranéen, Luis León Sánchez

Stage 2, Team Time Trial

Stage 1 Tour du Haut Var, Luis León Sánchez
Overall Paris–Nice, Luis León Sánchez

Stage 7, Luis León Sánchez

Stage 4 Tirreno–Adriatico, Joaquim Rodríguez
Stages 3 & 5 Vuelta a Castilla y León, Alejandro Valverde
Stage 1 Tour of the Basque Country, Luis León Sánchez
Klasika Primavera, Alejandro Valverde
Overall Four Days of Dunkirk, Rui Costa
Overall Volta a Catalunya, Alejandro Valverde

Stage 3, Alejandro Valverde

Overall Critérium du Dauphiné Libéré, Alejandro Valverde
Stage 8 Tour de France, Luis León Sánchez
Overall Vuelta a Burgos, Alejandro Valverde

Stage 2, Joaquim Rodríguez

Stage 2 Tour de l'Ain, José Joaquín Rojas
Overall Tour du Limousin, Mathieu Perget

Stage 3, David Arroyo

Overall Vuelta a España, Alejandro Valverde
Stage 3 Vuelta Chihuahua Internacional, Rui Costa
Stage 4 Vuelta Chihuahua Internacional, Daniel Moreno

== 2010 – Caisse d'Epargne ==
Stage 5 Tour Down Under, Luis León Sánchez
Trofeo Deia, Rui Costa
Stage 5 Volta ao Algarve, Luis León Sánchez
Overall Circuit de la Sarthe, Luis León Sánchez

Stage 1, Luis León Sánchez

Stage 8 Tour de Suisse, Rui Costa
Spain Road Race Championships, José Iván Gutiérrez
Spain Time Trial Championships, Luis León Sánchez
Portugal Time Trial Championships, Rui Costa
Clásica de San Sebastián, Luis León Sánchez
Stage 9 Vuelta a España, David López García
Stage 10 Vuelta a España, Imanol Erviti

== 2011 – Movistar Team ==
Stage 5 Tour Down Under, Francisco José Ventoso
Stage 6 Volta a Catalunya, José Joaquín Rojas
Stage 2 Tour of the Basque Country, Vasil Kiryienka
Stage 6 Giro d'Italia, Francisco Ventoso
Stage 20 Giro d'Italia, Vasil Kiryienka
Stage 2 Tour de Suisse, Mauricio Soler
Spain Road Race Championships, José Joaquín Rojas
Stage 8 Tour de France, Rui Costa
Grand Prix Cycliste de Montréal, Rui Costa

== 2012 – Movistar Team ==
Spain Road Race Championships, Francisco Ventoso
Belarus Time Trial Championships, Branislau Samoilau
Stage 5 Tour Down Under, Alejandro Valverde
Overall Vuelta a Andalucía, Alejandro Valverde

Stage 2, Alejandro Valverde

Overall Vuelta a Murcia, Nairo Quintana

Stage 1, Nairo Quintana

Stage 3 Paris–Nice, Alejandro Valverde
Stage 1 Tour of the Basque Country, José Joaquín Rojas
Stage 4 Circuit de la Sarthe, Francisco Ventoso
Klasika Primavera, Giovanni Visconti
Overall Vuelta a Castilla y León, Javier Moreno
Overall Vuelta a Asturias, Beñat Intxausti

Stage 2a, Jesús Herrada

Stage 1 (ITT) Vuelta a la Comunidad de Madrid, Jonathan Castroviejo
Stage 9 Giro d'Italia, Francisco Ventoso
Stage 14 Giro d'Italia, Andrey Amador
Stage 6 Critérium du Dauphiné, Nairo Quintana
Overall Tour de Suisse, Rui Costa

Stage 2, Rui Costa

Overall Route du Sud, Nairo Quintana

Stage 3, Nairo Quintana

Stage 17 Tour de France, Alejandro Valverde
Circuito de Getxo, Giovanni Visconti
Stage 1 Vuelta a España, Team Time Trial
Stages 3 & 8 Vuelta a España, Alejandro Valverde
Stage 5 Tour du Poitou-Charentes, Francisco Ventoso
Giro dell'Emilia, Nairo Quintana

== 2013 – Movistar Team ==
Trofeo Serra de Tramuntana, Alejandro Valverde
Overall Vuelta a Andalucía, Alejandro Valverde

Prologue & Stage 3, Alejandro Valverde

Stage 3 Volta a Catalunya, Nairo Quintana
Overall Tour of the Basque Country, Nairo Quintana

Stage 4, Nairo Quintana

Klasika Primavera, Rui Costa
Overall Vuelta a Castilla y León, Rubén Plaza

Stage 3, Rubén Plaza

Vuelta a la Comunidad de Madrid, Javier Moreno
Stage 8 (ITT) Giro d'Italia, Alex Dowsett
Stage 2 Vuelta a Asturias, Javier Moreno
Stages 15 & 17 Giro d'Italia, Giovanni Visconti
Stage 16 Giro d'Italia, Beñat Intxausti
Overall Tour de Suisse, Rui Costa

Stages 7 & 9 (ITT), Rui Costa

Great Britain Time Trial Championships, Alex Dowsett
Spain Time Trial Championships, Jonathan Castroviejo
Portugal Time Trial Championships, Rui Costa
Spain Road Race Championships, Jesús Herrada
King of the Mountains classification Tour de France, Nairo Quintana

Young Rider classification, Nairo Quintana
Stages 16 & 19, Rui Costa
Stage 20, Nairo Quintana

Overall Vuelta a Burgos, Nairo Quintana

Stage 5, Nairo Quintana

Stage 5 Tour du Poitou-Charentes, Jesús Herrada
Points classification in the Vuelta a España, Alejandro Valverde
Road Race World Championships, Rui Costa
Overall Tour of Beijing, Beñat Intxausti

Stage 4, Beñat Intxausti

== 2014 – Movistar Team ==
Overall Tour de San Luis, Nairo Quintana

Stage 4, Nairo Quintana
Stage 5 (ITT), Adriano Malori

Overall Vuelta a Andalucía, Alejandro Valverde

Prologue, Stages 1 & 2, Alejandro Valverde

Vuelta a Murcia, Alejandro Valverde
Roma Maxima, Alejandro Valverde
Stage 7 (ITT) Tirreno–Adriatico, Adriano Malori
GP Miguel Induráin, Alejandro Valverde
Stage 3 (ITT) Circuit de la Sarthe, Alex Dowsett
La Flèche Wallonne, Alejandro Valverde
Stage 1 Vuelta a Castilla y León, José Joaquín Rojas
Overall Giro d'Italia, Nairo Quintana

Young rider classification, Nairo Quintana
Stages 16 & 19 (ITT), Nairo Quintana

Stage 1 Route du Sud, Jesús Herrada
Stage 3 Route du Sud, Adriano Malori
Spain Time Trial Championships, Alejandro Valverde
Spain Road Race Championships, Ion Izagirre
Italy Time Trial Championships, Adriano Malori
Stage 3 Tour of Austria, Dayer Quintana

Team classification

Prueba Villafranca-Ordiziako Klasika, Gorka Izagirre
Stage 3 Tour de Wallonie, Juan José Lobato
Clásica de San Sebastián, Alejandro Valverde
Overall Vuelta a Burgos, Nairo Quintana

Stage 1, Juan José Lobato
Stage 3, Nairo Quintana

Stage 1 Vuelta a España, Team Time Trial
Stage 6 Vuelta a España, Alejandro Valverde
Stage 21 (ITT) Vuelta a España, Adriano Malori
Stage 5 Tour du Poitou-Charentes, Jesús Herrada

== 2015 – Movistar Team ==
Stage 2 Tour Down Under, Juan José Lobato
Stage 5 (ITT) Tour de San Luis, Adriano Malori
Trofeo Serra de Tramuntana, Alejandro Valverde
Stage 1 Tour of Qatar, José Joaquín Rojas
Stage 1b (ITT) Vuelta a Andalucía, Javier Moreno
Stages 2 & 5 Vuelta a Andalucía, Juan José Lobato
Overall Tirreno–Adriatico, Nairo Quintana

Stage 1 (ITT), Adriano Malori
Stage 5, Nairo Quintana

Stages 2, 5 & 7 Volta a Catalunya, Alejandro Valverde
Stage 2b (ITT) Circuit de la Sarthe, Adriano Malori
Klasika Primavera, José Herrada
La Flèche Wallonne, Alejandro Valverde
Liège–Bastogne–Liège, Alejandro Valverde
Overall Vuelta a Asturias, Igor Antón

Stage 1, Igor Antón
Stage 2, Jesús Herrada

Stage 8 Giro d'Italia, Beñat Intxausti
Overall Bayern Rundfahrt, Alex Dowsett

Stage 4 (ITT), Alex Dowsett

Mountains classification Giro d'Italia, Giovanni Visconti
Italy Time Trial Championships, Adriano Malori
Great Britain Time Trial Championships, Alex Dowsett
Spain Time Trial Championships, Jonathan Castroviejo
Spain Road Race Championships, Alejandro Valverde
Team classification Tour de France

Young rider classification, Nairo Quintana

Overall Tour de Pologne, Ion Izagirre
Stage 3, Tour du Limousin, Jesús Herrada
Stage 4 (ITT) Tour du Poitou-Charentes, Adriano Malori
Team classification Vuelta a España

Points classification, Alejandro Valverde
Stage 4, Alejandro Valverde

== 2016 – Movistar Team ==
Overall Tour de San Luis, Dayer Quintana
Stage 3 Dubai Tour, Juan José Lobato
Overall Vuelta a Andalucía, Alejandro Valverde

Stage 5, Alejandro Valverde

Overall Volta a Catalunya, Nairo Quintana
GP Miguel Induráin, Jon Izagirre
Stage 4 Circuit de la Sarthe, Juan José Lobato
Overall Vuelta a Castilla y León, Alejandro Valverde

Stage 1, Carlos Betancur
Stage 2, Alejandro Valverde

La Flèche Wallonne, Alejandro Valverde
Overall Tour de Romandie, Nairo Quintana

Prologue, Ion Izagirre
Stage 2, Nairo Quintana

Stage 2 Vuelta Asturias, Carlos Betancur
Stage 3 Vuelta Asturias, Daniel Moreno
Overall Vuelta Ciclista Comunidad de Madrid, Juan José Lobato

Stage 1, Juan José Lobato

Stage 16 Giro d'Italia, Alejandro Valverde
Stage 2 Critérium du Dauphiné, Jesús Herrada
Overall Route du Sud, Nairo Quintana

Stage 3 (ITT), Nairo Quintana

Stage 8 (ITT) Tour de Suisse, Ion Izagirre
Great Britain Time Trial Championships, Alex Dowsett
Spain Time Trial Championships, Ion Izagirre
Portugal Time Trial Championships, Nelson Oliveira
Spain Road Race Championships, José Joaquín Rojas
Stage 7 (ITT) Tour de Pologne, Alex Dowsett
Team classification Tour de France

Stage 20, Ion Izagirre

Europe Time Trial Championships, Jonathan Castroviejo
Overall Vuelta a España, Nairo Quintana

Combination classification, Nairo Quintana
Stage 10 Vuelta a España, Nairo Quintana

== 2017 – Movistar Team ==
Overall Volta a la Comunitat Valenciana, Nairo Quintana

Stage 4, Nairo Quintana

Vuelta a Murcia, Alejandro Valverde
Overall Vuelta a Andalucía, Alejandro Valverde

Stage 1, Alejandro Valverde

Stage 3 (ITT) Volta ao Algarve, Jonathan Castroviejo
Overall Volta ao Alentejo, Carlos Barbero
Overall Tirreno–Adriatico, Nairo Quintana

Stage 4, Nairo Quintana

Overall Volta a Catalunya, Alejandro Valverde

Stages 3, 5 & 7, Alejandro Valverde

Vuelta a La Rioja, Rory Sutherland
Stage 2b (ITT) Circuit de la Sarthe, Alex Dowsett
Overall Tour of the Basque Country, Alejandro Valverde

Stage 5, Alejandro Valverde

Klasika Primavera, Gorka Izagirre
La Flèche Wallonne, Alejandro Valverde
Liège–Bastogne–Liège, Alejandro Valverde
Overall Vuelta a Asturias, Nairo Quintana

Stage 2, Nairo Quintana

Stage 2 Vuelta a la Comunidad de Madrid, Carlos Barbero
Stage 3 Vuelta a la Comunidad de Madrid, Jasha Sütterlin
Team classification Giro d'Italia

Stage 8, Gorka Izagirre
Stage 9, Nairo Quintana

Stage 3 Vuelta a Castilla y León, Carlos Barbero
Stage 1 Hammer Sportzone Limburg
Spain Time Trial Championships, Jonathan Castroviejo
Spain Road Race Championships, Jesús Herrada
Circuito de Getxo, Carlos Barbero
Stage 4 Vuelta a Burgos, Carlos Barbero

== 2018 – Movistar Team ==
Overall Volta a la Comunitat Valenciana, Alejandro Valverde

Stages 2 & 4, Alejandro Valverde

Overall Abu Dhabi Tour, Alejandro Valverde

Stage 5, Alejandro Valverde

Stage 4 Tirreno–Adriatico, Mikel Landa
Overall Paris–Nice, Marc Soler
Overall Volta a Catalunya, Alejandro Valverde

Stages 2 & 4, Alejandro Valverde

Gran Premio Miguel Induráin, Alejandro Valverde
Klasika Primavera, Andrey Amador
Stage 1 Vuelta a Castilla y León, Carlos Barbero
Overall Vuelta Asturias Julio Alvarez Mendo, Richard Carapaz

Stage 2, Richard Carapaz

Stage 3 Vuelta Ciclista Comunidad de Madrid, Carlos Barbero
Stage 8 Giro d'Italia, Richard Carapaz
Overall Vuelta a Aragón, Jaime Roson
Stage 7 Tour de Suisse, Nairo Quintana
Overall Route d'Occitanie, Alejandro Valverde

Stage 3, Alejandro Valverde

Stage 17 Tour de France, Nairo Quintana
Stage 4 Vuelta a Burgos, Carlos Barbero
Stages 2 & 8 Vuelta a España, Alejandro Valverde
Road Race World Championships, Alejandro Valverde

== 2019 – Movistar Team ==
Overall Vuelta a San Juan, Winner Anacona

Stage 5, Winner Anacona

Stage 2 Tour La Provence, Eduard Prades
Stage 6 Tour Colombia, Nairo Quintana
Stage 3 UAE Tour, Alejandro Valverde
Stage 2 Settimana Internazionale di Coppi e Bartali, Mikel Landa
Klasika Primavera, Carlos Betancur
Overall Vuelta Asturias, Richard Carapaz

Stage 2, Richard Carapaz

Overall Giro d'Italia, Richard Carapaz

Stages 4 & 14, Richard Carapaz

Overall Vuelta a Aragón, Eduard Prades
Overall Route d'Occitanie, Alejandro Valverde

Stage 1, Alejandro Valverde

Spain Road Race Championships, Alejandro Valverde
Stage 1 Tour of Austria, Carlos Barbero
Stage 18 Tour de France, Nairo Quintana
Prueba Villafranca-Ordiziako Klasika, Rafael Valls
Stage 2 Vuelta a España, Nairo Quintana
Stage 7 Vuelta a España, Alejandro Valverde

== 2020 – Movistar Team ==
Pollença – Andratx, Marc Soler
Stage 2 Vuelta a España, Marc Soler
Young rider classification Vuelta a España, Enric Mas
UEC European Track Championships – Madison, Sebastián Mora & Albert Torres
UEC European Track Championships – Points race, Sebastián Mora

== 2021 – Movistar Team ==
GP Miguel Induráin, Alejandro Valverde
Stage 3 Volta a la Comunitat Valenciana, Enric Mas
Stage 3 Tour de Romandie, Marc Soler
Stage 2 Vuelta Asturias, Héctor Carretero
Overall Vuelta a Andalucía, Miguel Ángel López

Stage 1, Gonzalo Serrano
Stage 3, Miguel Ángel López

Stage 6 Critérium du Dauphiné, Alejandro Valverde
Mont Ventoux Dénivelé Challenge, Miguel Ángel López
Overall Route d'Occitanie, Antonio Pedrero

Stage 3, Antonio Pedrero

Puerto Rico Time Trial Championships, Abner González
Puerto Rico Road Race Championships, Abner González
Stage 18 Vuelta a España, Miguel Ángel López
Stage 3 Giro di Sicilia, Alejandro Valverde

== 2022 – Movistar Team ==
Trofeo Pollença – Port d'Andratx, Alejandro Valverde
Overall O Gran Camiño, Alejandro Valverde

Stage 3, Alejandro Valverde

Overall Vuelta a Asturias, Iván Sosa

Stage 2, Iván Sosa

Stage 7 Critérium du Dauphiné, Carlos Verona
Brazil U23 Time Trial Championships, Vinícius Rangel
Denmark Time Trial Championships, Mathias Norsgaard
Puerto Rico Road Race Championships, Abner González
Brazil Road Race Championships, Vinícius Rangel
Stage 2 Tour de Wallonie, Oier Lazkano
Stage 3 Tour de l'Ain, Antonio Pedrero
Overall Tour du Limousin, Alex Aranburu

Stage 3, Alex Aranburu

Overall Tour of Britain, Gonzalo Serrano

Stage 4, Gonzalo Serrano

Giro dell'Emilia, Enric Mas
Gran Piemonte, Iván García Cortina
Overall Tour de Langkawi, Iván Sosa

Stage 3, Iván Sosa

== 2023 – Movistar Team ==
Stage 4 Vuelta a San Juan, Fernando Gaviria
Overall Saudi Tour, Ruben Guerreiro

Stage 4, Ruben Guerreiro

Overall Tour of Oman, Matteo Jorgenson

Stage 3, Matteo Jorgenson

Stage 3 UAE Tour, Einer Rubio
Stage 4 Tour of the Alps, Gregor Mühlberger
Stage 5 Tour de Romandie, Fernando Gaviria
Stage 13 Giro d'Italia, Einer Rubio
Overall Boucles de la Mayenne, Oier Lazkano

Stage 1, Oier Lazkano

Spain National Road Race Championships, Oier Lazkano
Austria National Road Race Championships, Gregor Mühlberger
Stage 4 Vuelta a Burgos, Oier Lazkano
Stage 2 Deutschland Tour, Gregor Mühlberger
Grand Prix de Wallonie, Gonzalo Serrano

== 2024 – Movistar Team ==
Trofeo Pollença–Port d'Andratx, Pelayo Sánchez
Stage 5 Volta a la Comunitat Valenciana, Will Barta
Stage 1 Tour Colombia, Fernando Gaviria
Clásica Jaén Paraíso Interior, Oier Lazkano
Stage 6 Giro d'Italia, Pelayo Sánchez
Stage 4 Tour of Belgium, Alex Aranburu
Spain National Road Race Championships, Alex Aranburu
Circuito de Getxo, Jon Barrenetxea

== 2025 – Movistar Team ==
Stage 3 Tour Down Under, Javier Romo
Ecuador National Time Trial Championships, Jefferson Alveiro Cepeda
Stage 3 Volta a la Comunitat Valenciana, Iván Romeo
Stage 5 Vuelta a Andalucía, Jon Barrenetxea
Stage 2 Vuelta a Asturias, Iván García Cortina
Stage 3 Critérium du Dauphiné, Iván Romeo
Venezuela National Time Trial Championships, Orluis Aular
Spain National Road Race Championships, Iván Romeo
Venezuela National Road Race Championships, Orluis Aular

== 2026 – Movistar Team ==
Stage 5 Volta a la Comunitat Valenciana, Raúl García Pierna
Overall Vuelta a Andalucía, Iván Romeo

Stage 2, Iván Romeo

== Supplementary statistics ==
=== 1981 to 2001 ===
Grand Tours by highest finishing position
Race	1981	1982	1983	1984	1985	1986	1987	1988	1989	1990	1991	1992	1993	1994	1995	1996	1997	1998	1999	2000	2001
Giro d'Italia	–	–	–	–	–	–	–	7	–	–	14	1	1	3	26	–	–	–	33	10	3
Tour de France	–	–	2	6	9	11	79	1	3	4	1	1	1	1	1	11	4	DNF (Note: The team pulled out in the feed zone of Stage 17 following the poor treatment of riders by police)	2	9	13
Vuelta a España	7	5	12	4	11	25	11	12	1	2	2	3	6	2	7	12	21	1	5	24	5
Major week-long stage races by highest finishing position
Race	1981	1982	1983	1984	1985	1986	1987	1988	1989	1990	1991	1992	1993	1994	1995	1996	1997	1998	1999	2000	2001
Tour Down Under	Did not Exist																		–	–	45
Paris–Nice	–	26	–	–	–	–	–	3	1	1	–	1	4	2	5	–	3	13	–	3	14
Tirreno–Adriatico	20	–	–	–	6	–	–	–	–	–	22	–	–	50	–	21	–	–	21	–	89
Volta a Catalunya	10	3	5	3	3	8	2	1	2	3	1	1	4	3	3	13	2	6	1	1	6
Tour of the Basque Country	4	1	1	9	7	10	3	3	6	1	10	5	17	15	10	6	8	5	37	6	5
Tour de Romandie	–	–	–	–	–	–	–	6	–	–	10	2	15	27	10	–	–	–	8	–	–
Critérium du Dauphiné	–	–	–	–	–	–	–	–	–	–	–	–	–	–	1	1	2	1	7	4	7
Tour de Suisse	–	–	–	–	–	–	–	–	10	–	–	–	–	–	–	DNF	–	–	–	–	–
Tour de Pologne	–	–	–	–	–	–	–	–	–	–	–	–	–	–	–	–	–	–	–	–	–
Ronde van Nederland	–	–	–	–	–	–	–	–	–	–	–	–	–	13	10	–	7	–	–	–	15
Monument races by highest finishing position
Monument	1981	1982	1983	1984	1985	1986	1987	1988	1989	1990	1991	1992	1993	1994	1995	1996	1997	1998	1999	2000	2001
Milan–San Remo	–	–	–	–	–	–	–	56	61	53	23	32	61	31	28	88	81	47	37	68	52
Tour of Flanders	–	–	–	–	–	–	–	–	–	–	–	–	–	85	63	–	–	–	–	–	–
Paris–Roubaix	–	–	–	–	–	–	42	–	–	–	–	–	–	46	–	–	–	–	–	–	–
Liège–Bastogne–Liège	–	–	–	–	–	48	49	21	4	12	4	3	11	28	22	30	69	24	41	20	24
Giro di Lombardia	–	–	–	10	–	18	–	–	–	51	39	–	–	57	52	42	–	–	–	–	10
Classics by highest finishing position
Classic	1981	1982	1983	1984	1985	1986	1987	1988	1989	1990	1991	1992	1993	1994	1995	1996	1997	1998	1999	2000	2001
Omloop Het Nieuwsblad	–	–	–	–	–	NH	–	–	–	–	–	–	–	14	–	–	–	–	–	–	–
E3 Harelbeke	–	–	–	–	–	–	–	–	–	–	–	–	–	–	–	–	–	–	–	–	–
Gent–Wevelgem	–	–	–	–	–	–	–	–	–	–	–	–	–	–	–	–	–	–	–	–	–
Amstel Gold Race	–	–	–	–	–	–	–	–	–	–	108	–	72	8	31	26	17	28	57	–	–
La Flèche Wallonne	–	–	–	–	–	–	–	8	7	4	4	5	2	35	11	85	67	32	11	22	4
Clásica de San Sebastián	29	3	4	3	2	8	2	6	10	1	2	18	12	8	9	12	34	16	6	15	26

=== 2002 to 2021 ===
World Team Time Trial performance
World TTT Championships	2002	2003	2004	2005	2006	2007	2008	2009	2010	2011	2012	2013	2014	2015	2016	2017	2018	2019	2020	2021
Position	Did not Exist										6	10	6	3	6	6	6	Does not Exist		
Margin	Did not Exist										+ 1' 19"	+ 2' 31"	+ 51"	+ 30"	+ 1' 11"	+ 1' 19"	+ 1' 32"	Does not Exist		
Grand Tours by highest finishing position
Race	2002	2003	2004	2005	2006	2007	2008	2009	2010	2011	2012	2013	2014	2015	2016	2017	2018	2019	2020	2021
Giro d'Italia	–	–	–	7	24	10	17	8	2	13	17	8	1	4	3	2	4	1	13	22
Tour de France	7	10	6	4	1	5	8	24	9	34	18	2	4	2	3	12	7	6	5	6
Vuelta a España	17	5	3	4	2	6	5	1	9	14	2	3	3	4	1	18	5	2	5	2
Major week-long stage races by highest finishing position
Race	2002	2003	2004	2005	2006	2007	2008	2009	2010	2011	2012	2013	2014	2015	2016	2017	2018	2019	2020	2021
Tour Down Under	–	–	–	–	–	–	3	3	2	6	2	2	14	5	6	13	34	22	28	NH
Paris–Nice	15	–	12	2	3	3	5	1	2	14	3	15	4	9	5	4	1	2	–	8
Tirreno–Adriatico	28	11	–	32	38	11	11	15	13	22	20	8	2	1	16	1	6	20	24	11
Volta a Catalunya	6	10	2	5	8	1	2	1	4	5	10	4	5	2	1	1	1	4	NH	4
Tour of the Basque Country	1	6	1	4	2	5	14	5	21	4	14	1	5	3	3	1	2	7	NH	7
Tour de Romandie	–	–	8	11	3	15	17	4	11	5	3	3	6	8	1	9	17	11	NH	4
Critérium du Dauphiné	6	4	–	10	7	15	1	1	23	43	6	7	15	4	28	9	16	9	12	6
Tour de Suisse	–	–	–	31	9	1	13	13	7	14	1	1	10	19	2	8	3	8	NH	13
Tour de Pologne	2	–	32	15	16	6	11	2	14	36	11	6	2	1	6	14	12	34	37	23
BinckBank Tour	–	–	–	14	26	1	1	13	20	20	6	24	24	21	8	11	21	48	16	39
Monument races by highest finishing position
Monument	2002	2003	2004	2005	2006	2007	2008	2009	2010	2011	2012	2013	2014	2015	2016	2017	2018	2019	2020	2021
Milan–San Remo	25	64	38	11	24	9	33	34	20	11	16	11	4	20	15	14	57	7	17	25
Tour of Flanders	43	34	121	DNF	38	70	64	56	37	18	44	45	33	34	7	18	60	8	68	23
Paris–Roubaix	–	25	68	63	36	26	55	40	12	45	22	37	54	64	9	40	30	73	NH	27
Liège–Bastogne–Liège	11	7	15	33	1	2	1	2	26	27	17	3	2	1	16	1	13	7	29	4
Il Lombardia	7	13	42	12	17	42	3	20	3	25	11	2	2	4	6	9	11	2	16	5
Classics by highest finishing position
Classic	2002	2003	2004	2005	2006	2007	2008	2009	2010	2011	2012	2013	2014	2015	2016	2017	2018	2019	2020	2021
Omloop Het Nieuwsblad	–	–	NH	–	–	–	–	–	–	–	–	–	–	–	–	–	–	25	16	11
Kuurne–Brussels–Kuurne	—	—	—	—	—	—	—	—	—	—	—	NH	—	—	—	—	—	10	10	—
Strade Bianche	Did not Exist					—	—	—	—	—	13	13	3	3	10	29	4	25	DNF	22
E3 Harelbeke	–	–	–	–	–	–	–	–	–	–	32	14	32	82	18	39	32	9	NH	23
Gent–Wevelgem	–	23	26	45	13	9	7	22	23	24	10	10	21	13	36	24	33	12	16	18
Amstel Gold Race	23	18	45	13	22	6	3	21	80	65	19	2	4	2	8	5	5	66	NH	5
La Flèche Wallonne	15	2	20	8	1	2	8	7	53	19	18	7	1	1	1	1	2	11	32	3
Clásica de San Sebastián	30	31	33	14	8	2	1	16	1	14	26	2	1	3	3	25	41	10	NH	11

=== 2022 to present ===
Grand Tours by highest finishing position
Race	2022	2023	2024
Giro d'Italia	11	11	7
Tour de France	21	37	19
Vuelta a España	2	6	3
Major week-long stage races by highest finishing position
Race	2022	2023	2024
Tour Down Under	NH	9	14
UAE Tour	6	13	13
Paris–Nice	29	8	15
Tirreno–Adriatico	29	6	12
Volta a Catalunya	11	13	5
Tour of the Basque Country	9	5	15
Tour de Romandie	10	2	6
Critérium du Dauphiné	13	17	9
Tour de Suisse	18	19	7
Tour de Pologne	30	25	12
Benelux Tour	NH	32	41
Tour of Guangxi	NH	8	34
Monument races by highest finishing position
Monument	2022	2023	2024
Milan–San Remo	13	25	26
Tour of Flanders	20	9	26
Paris–Roubaix	25	32	38
Liège–Bastogne–Liège	7	23	14
Il Lombardia	2	23	5
Classics by highest finishing position
Classic	2022	2023	2024
Omloop Het Nieuwsblad	13	18	15
Kuurne–Brussels–Kuurne	22	11	3
Strade Bianche	2	16	7
Classic Brugge–De Panne	13	19	14
E3 Harelbeke	16	4	14
Gent–Wevelgem	8	60	58
Dwars door Vlaanderen	24	2	9
Amstel Gold Race	19	31	46
La Flèche Wallonne	2	13	24
Eschborn–Frankfurt	–	–	2
Clásica de San Sebastián	19	7	38
Bretagne Classic Ouest-France	12	16	29
Hamburg Cyclassics	9	9	15
Grand Prix Cycliste de Québec	5	4	15
Grand Prix Cycliste de Montréal	22	3	15

Legend
—	Did not compete
DNF	Did not finish
NH	Not held
