= La Vie Claire =

Professional cycling team (1984–1991)

Team information
- Registered: France
- Founded: 1984
- Disbanded: 1991
- Discipline: Road

Key personnel
- General manager: Bernard Tapie

Team name history
- 1984 1985–1986 1987 1988 1989 1990–1991: La Vie Claire–Terraillon; La Vie Claire–Radar; Toshiba–La Vie Claire; Toshiba–Look; Toshiba–Kärcher–Look; Toshiba
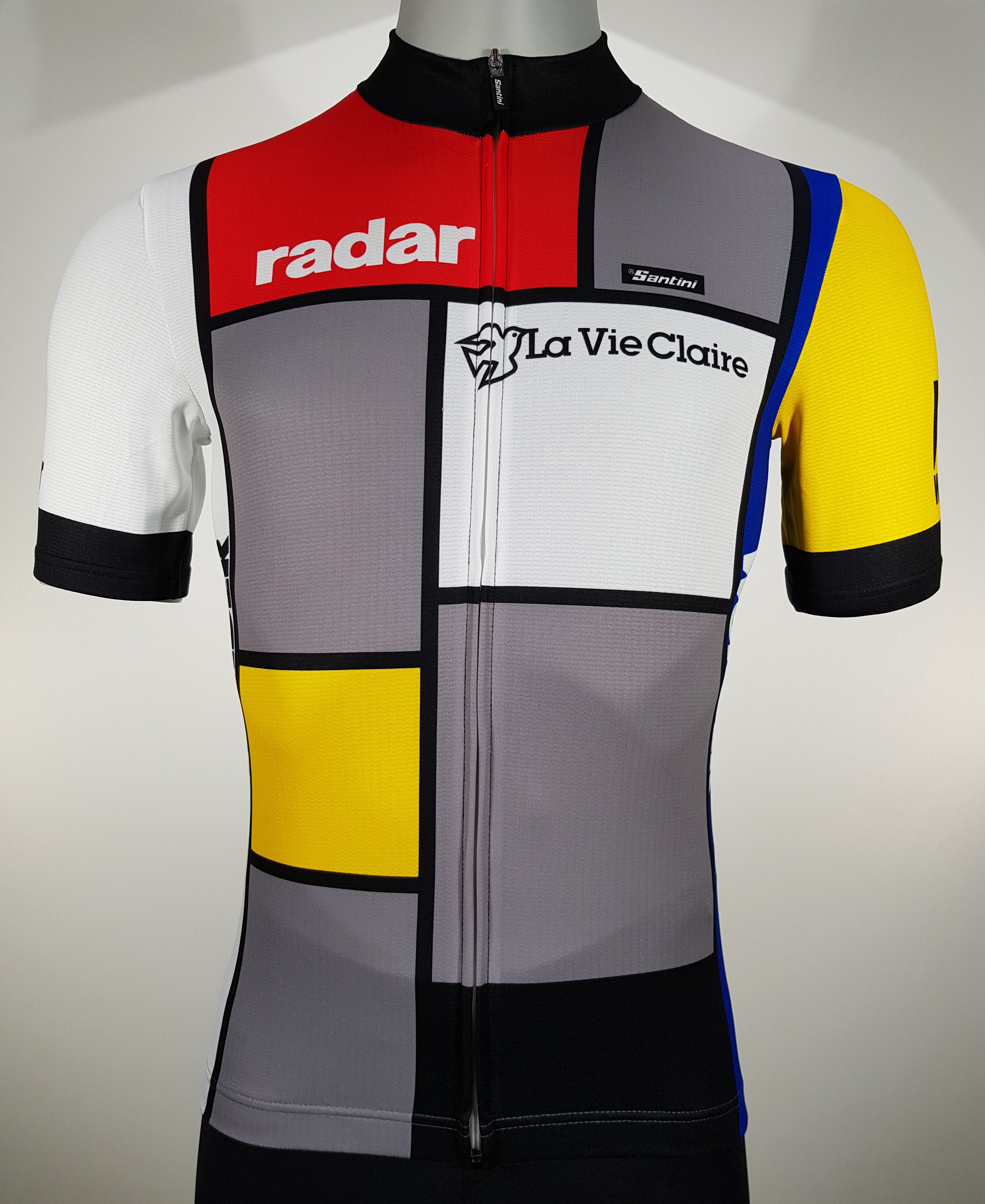
La Vie Claire jersey
Jersey

La Vie Claire was a professional road bicycle racing team named after its chief sponsor La Vie Claire, a chain of health food stores.

== History ==
The La Vie Claire team was created in 1984 by Bernard Tapie and directed by Paul Köchli. The team included five-time Tour de France winner Bernard Hinault, and three-time winner, Greg LeMond, as well as Andrew Hampsten and the Canadian Steve Bauer. With Hinault winning the Tour in 1985, and LeMond winning in 1986, plus winning the team trophy both years, La Vie Claire cemented their place in cycling team history. The team formed after Bernard Hinault had a dispute with his former directeur sportif Cyrille Guimard of Renault–Elf–Gitane with whom Hinault had won four editions of the Tour de France. After Hinault's teammate Laurent Fignon won the 1983 Tour de France while Hinault was injured, Fignon became the designated leader of the team. Hinault formed the La Vie Claire team with Tapie and Köchli and steadily built up his form. During the 1984 Tour de France, Renault–Elf–Gitane dominated the race with 8 stage wins including the Team time trial as well as wearing the yellow jersey from the 5th stage onward with Vincent Barteau and Laurent Fignon. Fignon won the Tour by over ten minutes from Hinault. In addition with World Champion Greg LeMond the Renault team also finished third overall in that Tour and LeMond won the Young rider's jersey. After this dominance by the Renault–Elf–Gitane team, Tapie and Hinault approached Greg LeMond after the 1984 Tour with a one-million dollar contract offer – the first in cycling history – to leave Renault–Elf–Gitane and join Hinault at La Vie Claire. LeMond accepted and forever changed the salary structure in bicycle racing. With Hinault and LeMond the team won the 1985 and the 1986 Tour de France. At the end of 1986, Hinault retired and in the spring of 1987 LeMond was injured in a hunting accident. Hampsten who had finished fourth in the 1986 Tour de France and as best young rider left the team at the end of 1986. Jean-François Bernard was seen by some as a successor to Hinault in stage races and became the leader of the team. Bernard led the general classification during the 1987 Tour de France and finished third overall, and led the general classification during the 1988 Giro d'Italia but then never regained the form to perform in the grand tours for the team. The team itself was undergoing further changes – LeMond and Bauer left the team at the end of 1987 and Köchli and Tapie stopped directing the team in 1988 and 1989. During the latter years of the team Laurent Jalabert and Tony Rominger were team leaders and earned success for the team.

== Jersey ==
The La Vie Claire colors (red, yellow, blue and gray) were based on the artwork of Piet Mondrian, giving them a unique appearance in the peloton during the 80s Tours de France. The La Vie Claire jersey, originally designed by Benetton, went through at least five major revisions between 1984 and 1988 as the team partnered different sponsors (Radar, Wonder, Toshiba, LOOK (and Red Zinger and Celestial Seasonings when racing on American soil)). The design (sleeves: yellow and grey; chest: pattern of rectangles in different sizes and colors) is considered one of the most memorable jersey designs in cycling. Manufactured by Santini of Italy, it is still very popular with cycling fans, topping a cyclingnews.com poll in 2018. From 1987, Toshiba became the main sponsor of the team and from 1988 onwards La Vie Claire withdrew their sponsorship. The jersey was redesigned in 1990. The Toshiba team continued until the end of the 1991 season.

== Technology ==
Also strongly associated with La Vie Claire was the French company LOOK, which made the first clipless pedals, and which was owned by Tapie at that time.

La Vie Claire was among the first to use carbon fiber frames in the Tour de France. The team switched in 1986 from their previous supplier, Hinault, to carbon fiber frames and forks by TVT. In 1989 the team rode a carbon-fiber frame/fork manufactured by LOOK and fitted with titanium components. In the same year, the team began to use heart rate monitors in training and racing, a technology that the traditional training culture in cycling at first resisted.

== Intra-team rivalry ==
In the 1985 Tour de France, Hinault was considered the leader of the team, which would work for him to win the Tour for a record-tying fifth time. But after dominating the first two-thirds of the race, on stage 14 Hinault crashed in Saint-Étienne and broke his nose. Though he continued, his injury and subsequent bronchitis caused him to be weakened thereafter.

On stage 17 LeMond and a rival rider, Stephen Roche, were far ahead of the pack when the team boss Bernard Tapie and coach Paul Köchli asked him to slow down, saying that Hinault was 45 seconds behind. LeMond refrained from attacking and waited at the stage's finish where he realized he'd been misled; Hinault was in fact more than three minutes behind. Hinault went on to win that year's Tour by 1 minute 42 seconds; in return for his assistance, LeMond was assured by Hinault that he would support LeMond the following year.

In the following year's Tour, Hinault surprised LeMond by riding an aggressive race, going on individual attacks, which he insisted was to deter and demoralize their mutual rivals. He claimed his tactics were to wear down LeMond's (and his) opponents and that he knew that LeMond would win because of time losses earlier in the race. However, LeMond saw this as a betrayal and accused Hinault of reneging on his promise. In LeMond's words, "He totally tried screwing me. But I don't blame him." As the 1986 Tour wore on, loyalties among LeMond and Hinault's teammates split along national lines, with the Americans and British supporting LeMond and the French and Belgians backing Hinault. Andrew Hampsten said of the 1986 Tour: "It was rotten being on the team... Steve Bauer and I had to chase down Hinault on the stage into Saint-Étienne. That really sucked." The competition, abandoned promises, and high stakes in the LeMond-Hinault controversy makes it one of the most public and bitter rivalries between teammates in cycling history. Their story was chronicled in the book Slaying the Badger by Richard Moore.

== Major wins ==
1984
Overall Vuelta Ciclista a la Communidad Valenciana, Bruno Cornillet

Stage 1, Bruno Cornillet
Stage 5, Bernard Hinault

Stage 3 Tour de Romandie, Bernard Vallet
Prologue Tour de France, Bernard Hinault
Callac criterium, Bernard Hinault
Lamballe criterium, Bernard Hinault
's-Heerenhoek criterium, Bernard Hinault
Clásica San Sebastián, Niki Rüttimann
Tour de l'Avenir

Stages 4 & 5, Benno Wiss
Stage 12, Marc Gomez

Grand Prix des Nations, Bernard Hinault
Trofeo Baracchi, Bernard Hinault
Giro del Piemonte, Christian Jourdan
Giro di Lombardia, Bernard Hinault
1985
Aix-en-Provence, Steve Bauer
Stage 2 Critérium International, Charly Berard
Overall Giro d'Italia, Bernard Hinault

Stage 12, Bernard Hinault

Tour de Suisse

Stage 1, Guido Winterberg
Stage 2, Charly Berard
Stage 5a, Jean-François Bernard

Overall Tour de France, Bernard Hinault

Combination classification, Greg LeMond
Prologue & Stage 8, Bernard Hinault
Stage 3 TTT
Stage 21, Greg LeMond

Post Danmark Rundt

Stage 2, Kim Andersen
Stage 4, Benno Wiss

Stage 2 Paris–Bourges, Bruno Cornillet
Tour de l'Avenir

Stage 4 TTT
Stage 13, Benno Wiss

1986
Overall Étoile de Bessèges, Niki Rüttimann
Overall Tour Méditerranéen, Jean-François Bernard

Stage 5a, Jean-François Bernard

Overall Vuelta Ciclista a la Communidad Valenciana, Bernard Hinault

Stage 4a, Greg LeMond

Prologue & Stage 5b Tour de Romandie, Jean-François Bernard
Stage 5 Giro d'Italia, Greg LeMond
Stage 7 Clásico RCN, Bernard Hinault
Prologue Critérium du Dauphiné, Jean-François Bernard
Overall Tour de Suisse, Andrew Hampsten

Prologue, Andrew Hampsten
Stage 8, Guido Winterberg

Overall Tour de France, Greg LeMond

Mountains classification, Bernard Hinault
Young rider classification, Andrew Hampsten
Stages 9, 18 & 20, Bernard Hinault
Stage 13, Greg LeMond
Stage 14, Niki Rüttimann
Stage 16, Jean-François Bernard

Stage 2 Tour of Ireland, Steve Bauer
1987
Stage 5 Vuelta a Andalucía, Andreas Kappes
Stage 4 Paris–Nice, Jean-François Bernard
Stage 1 Critérium International, Steve Bauer
La Flèche Wallonne Jean-Claude Leclercq
Stage 5 Circuit Cycliste Sarthe: Othmar Häfliger
Stage 1 Tour de Romandie, Niki Rüttimann
Stage 19 Giro d'Italia, Jean-François Bernard
Stage 8 Tour de Suisse, Roy Knickman
Stages 18 & 24 Tour de France Jean-François Bernard
Overall Post Danmark Rundt Kim Andersen
Overall GP Tell, Guido Winterberg

Stage 1 Pascal Richard
Stages 2 & 3, Kim Andersen

Overall Paris–Bourges, Kim Andersen

Stage 3, Kim Andersen

1988
Paris–Nice

TTT Prologue
Stage 6a, Andreas Kappes

Giro d'Italia

Stages 1, 8 & 15, Jean-François Bernard
Stage 7, Andreas Kappes

Tour du Lyonais, Fabrice Philipot
GP Plouay, Luc Leblanc
Stage 6b Volta Ciclista a Catalunya, Jacques Hanegraaf
1989
Stage 1 Vuelta Ciclista a la Communidad Valenciana, Andreas Kappes
Stage 1 Critérium International: Marc Madiot
Stages 1b & 2 Route du Sud, Philippe Leleu
Tour de Suisse

Stage 5a, Remig Stumpf
Stages 7 & 8, Andreas Kappes

Young rider classification Tour de France, Fabrice Philipot
1990
Stage 3 Vuelta a Andalucía, Pascal Lance
Stage 1b Vuelta Ciclista a la Communidad Valenciana, Remig Stumpf
Stage 8b Paris–Nice, Jean-François Bernard
Stage 2 Tour du Vaucluse, Thierry Bourguignon
Vuelta a España

Stage 15, Jean-François Bernard
Stage 21, Denis Roux

France National Road Race Championships, Philippe Louviot
Overall Paris–Bourges, Laurent Jalabert

Stage 1, Laurent Jalabert

Overall Tour du Limousin, Martial Gayant

Stage 1, Christian Chaubet

Stage 8 Tour de la Communauté Europeènne, Martial Gayant
Stage 7 Herald Sun Tour, Jean-François Bernard
1991
Overall Paris–Nice, Tony Rominger

Stages 6 & 8, Tony Rominger

Overall Tour de Romandie, Tony Rominger

Stages 2 & 4, Tony Rominger

Overall Cronostaffetta, Pascal Lance, Hans Kindberg, Sébastien Flicher, Laurent Bezault, Tony Rominger

Stage 1b (TTT), Pascal Lance, Hans Kindberg, Sébastien Flicher, Laurent Bezault, Tony Rominger

Grand Prix des Nations, Tony Rominger

=== Supplementary statistics ===
Grand Tours by highest finishing position
Race	1984	1985	1986	1987	1988	1989	1990	1991
Vuelta a España	–	–	–	–	–	–	10	–
Giro d'Italia	–	1	4	10	12	–	–	–
Tour de France	2	1	1	3	65	24	47	16
Major week-long stage races by highest finishing position
Race	1984	1985	1986	1987	1988	1989	1990	1991
Paris–Nice	3	11	3	2	6	3	11	1
Tirreno–Adriatico	–	9	–	7	17	–	–	–
Volta a Catalunya	–	–	–	–	13	–	–	–
Tour of the Basque Country	–	2	45	–	–	33	–	–
Tour de Romandie	3	5	2	2	5	10	39	1
Critérium du Dauphiné	2	4	7	8	4	4	9	3
Tour de Suisse	–	2	1	8	–	8	–	–
Ronde van Nederland	–	–	–	–	–	–	13	–
Monument races by highest finishing position
Race	1984	1985	1986	1987	1988	1989	1990	1991
Milan–San Remo	–	9	2	11	22	26	11	17
Tour of Flanders	–	7	4	4	23	59	17	9
Paris–Roubaix	–	4	29	–	10	6	4	18
Liège–Bastogne–Liège	19	16	14	10	17	2	–	11
Giro di Lombardia	1	25	10	–	10	11	15	2
Classics by highest finishing position
Classic	1984	1985	1986	1987	1988	1989	1990	1991
Omloop Het Volk	–	4	NH	–	60	3	–	19
E3 Harelbeke	–	–	–	–	–	–	37	–
Gent–Wevelgem	–	18	5	41	39	12	26	32
Amstel Gold Race	–	–	–	11	9	7	7	7
La Flèche Wallonne	4	23	4	1	5	5	30	22
Clásica de San Sebastián	1	5	–	11	5	26	2	4
Paris–Tours	16	24	27	22	11	13	5	7

Legend
—	Did not compete
DNF	Did not finish
NH	Not held

== Sources ==
(1) Bryan Malessa, "Once Was King: An interview with Greg LeMond" http://www.roble.net/marquis/coaching/lemond98.html

(2) Andrew Hampsten: The Interview http://www.pezcyclingnews.com/?pg=fullstory&id=1202

(3) Inside Cycling with John Wilcockson: Hinault takes a big early lead in dramatic '85 Tour [filed Nov. 28, 2005] https://web.archive.org/web/20070929083304/http://www.velonews.com/news/fea/9206.0.html
