= Miguel Induráin =

Spanish cyclist (born 1964)

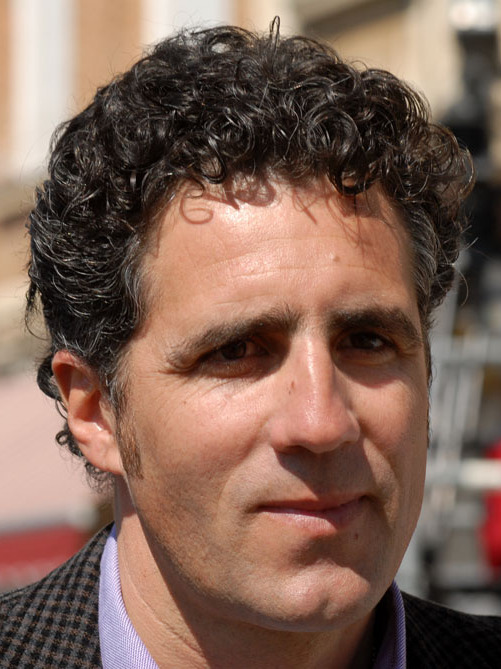
- Induráin in 2009

Personal information
- Full name: Miguel María Induráin Larraya
- Nicknames: Miguelón; Big Mig
- Born: 16 July 1964 (age 62) Villava - Atarrabia, Navarre, Spain
- Height: 1.86 m (6 ft 1 in)
- Weight: 76 kg (168 lb; 12 st 0 lb)

Cycling career
- Sport: Cycling
- Discipline: Road
- Role: Rider
- Rider type: All-rounder

Amateur team
- 1978–1983: CC Villavés

Professional teams
- 1984–1989: Reynolds
- 1990–1996: Banesto

Major wins
- Grand Tour Tour de France General classification (1991, 1992, 1993, 1994, 1995) 12 individual stages (1989–1995) Giro d'Italia General classification (1992, 1993) Intergiro classification (1992) 4 individual stages (1992, 1993) Stage races Volta a Catalunya (1988, 1991, 1992) Paris–Nice (1989, 1990) Critérium du Dauphiné Libéré (1995, 1996) Critérium International (1991) Grand Prix du Midi Libre (1995) One-day races and Classics Olympic Time Trial (1996) World Time Trial Championships (1995) National Road Race Championships (1992) Clásica de San Sebastián (1990) Other Vélo d'Or (1992, 1993) Hour record 53.040 km (2 September 1994)
Medal record
Representing Spain
Men's road bicycle racing
Olympic Games
| Gold medal – first place | 1996 Atlanta | Time trial |
World Championships
| Gold medal – first place | 1995 Duitama | Elite time trial |
| Silver medal – second place | 1993 Oslo | Elite road race |
| Silver medal – second place | 1995 Duitama | Elite road race |
| Bronze medal – third place | 1991 Stuttgart | Elite road race |

Miguel Induráin Larraya (Spanish pronunciation: [miˈɣel induˈɾajn laˈraʝa]; born 16 July 1964) is a retired Spanish road racing cyclist. Induráin won five Tours de France from 1991 to 1995, the fourth to win five times, and the only five-time winner to achieve those victories consecutively.

He won the Giro d'Italia twice, becoming one of seven people to achieve the Giro-Tour double in the same season. He wore the race leader's yellow jersey in the Tour de France for 60 days. He holds the record for the most consecutive Tour de France wins and shares the record for most wins with Jacques Anquetil, Bernard Hinault, Eddy Merckx and Tadej Pogačar. In 1993, Indurain came close to cycling's 'Triple Crown' when, having already won the Giro and the Tour, he finished in second place just 19 seconds behind in the World Championship.

Induráin's ability and physical size—186 centimetres (6 feet 1 inch) and 76 kilograms (168 pounds)—earned him the nickname "Miguelón" or "Big Mig". He was the youngest rider ever to win the Spanish amateur national road championship, when he was 18, at 20 the youngest rider to lead the Vuelta a España, and at 20 he won a stage of the Tour de l'Avenir.

== Early life and amateur career ==
Miguel Induráin was born in the village of Villava (now Villava – Atarrabia), which is now an outlying area of Pamplona. He has three sisters – Isabel, María Dolores and María Asunción – and a brother, Prudencio, who also became a professional cyclist. His first bicycle was a green secondhand Olmo given to him for his 10th birthday. It was stolen when he was 11 and he worked in the fields with his father to pay for a new one.

Induráin tried running, basketball, javelin and football from nine to 14. Then he joined the local CC Villavés and rode his first race in July 1978, (Note: L'Équipe reported on 8 July 2001 that 2,000 children had taken up cycling in the town because of Induráin's fame.) an event for unlicensed riders in which he finished second. He won his second race and competed every week thereafter. His hero in cycling was Bernard Hinault. At 18 he was the youngest winner of the national amateur road championship.

== Professional career ==
In 1984 he rode in the Olympic Games at Los Angeles and then turned professional on 4 September for Reynolds. He won his first professional race a week later, a time trial in the Tour de l'Avenir. In 1985 he started the Vuelta a España and came second in the prologue, behind Bert Oosterbosch. Oosterbosch lost time on the second stage and Induráin became leader, the youngest rider to do so. He rode the Tour de France later that year, as he would do in each of the next 11 years, but dropped out in the fourth stage.

In 1986, Induráin again rode the Tour, dropping out on the 12th stage. He started the 1987 Vuelta a España with bronchitis from the Tour of Belgium. He rode the 1988 Tour de France as teammate of the winner Pedro Delgado. In 1989, he escaped during the ninth stage of the Tour de France. He won the stage and became leader of the mountains classification, wearing the polkadot jersey the next stage, the only time in his career. In 1990, Induráin rode the Tour de France again for Delgado, but Delgado could not win. Induráin finished 10th place, sacrificing several places by waiting for Delgado.

Induráin was a strong time trialist, gaining on rivals and riding defensively in the climbing stages. Induráin won only two Tour stages that were not individual time trials: mountain stages to Cauterets (1989) and Luz Ardiden (1990) in the Pyrenees. During his five consecutive Tour de France wins he never won a stage that was not a time trial. These superior abilities in the discipline fit perfectly with the TT heavy Tours of the era, with many featuring between 150 and 200 km of time trialling vs the more common 50–80 km today.

=== 1991: First Tour win ===
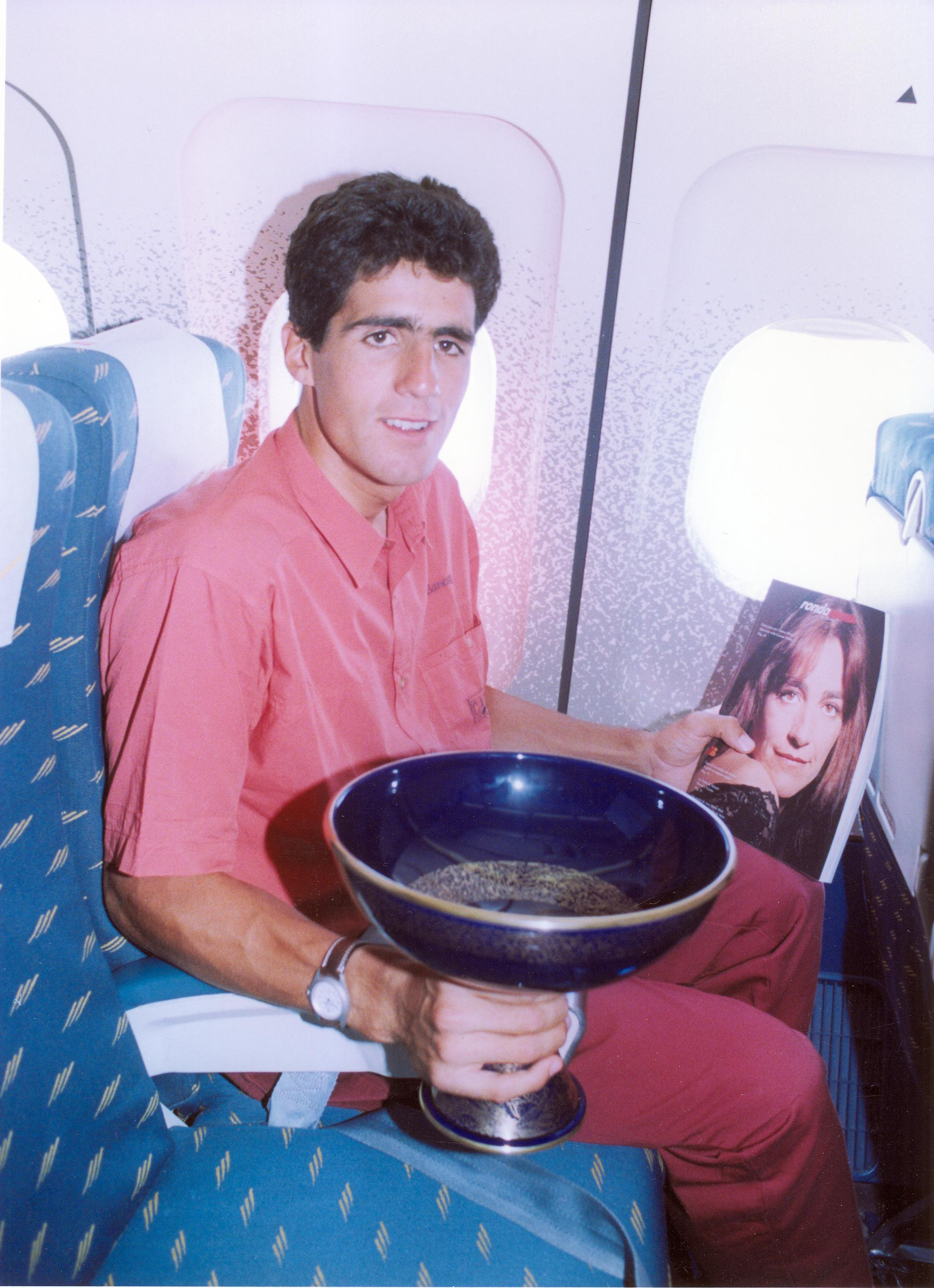
Induráin with the trophy won at the 1991 Tour de France

In 1991, Greg LeMond was favourite for the Tour and while Induráin was a fine time trialist he was considered too large to be a good climber. LeMond led the race until the 12th stage but on the 13th he broke down on the Tourmalet, and lost more than seven minutes to Induráin, who became the leader and stayed leader to the end.

=== 1992: Tour-Giro double ===
Induráin won the prologue at San Sebastián and seized the yellow jersey, only to lose it the next day. Induráin finished the time trial in stage nine, over 65 km, three minutes ahead of number two on the stage. Near the end he caught Laurent Fignon, who had started six minutes before him. The 1992 Tour was remarkable for a long breakaway by Claudio Chiappucci on a stage to Sestriere that included six mountains. Induráin seemed to crack on the final climb to Sestriere being passed by Franco Vona but managed to finish third, enough to claim the yellow jersey once more. From here Induráin would establish his racing style "crush rivals in the time trials and control them in the mountains" His defensive tactic brought criticism from Induráin's boyhood hero, Bernard Hinault, who said: "Induráin is the best rider of his generation but he has won this Tour quietly, without great opposition. If the opposition continues to let him get away with it, his reign looks like lasting a long time".

He also won the Giro d'Italia in 1992. After winning the early time trial, Induráin gained a decisive advantage on stage 9 to Latina-Terminillo. There, on the first summit finish of the race, Induráin finished in the first group, dropping the main contenders, and gaining 30 seconds on Chiappucci. On his way to overall victory by 5mins 12secs over Chiappucci, Induráin also won the final stage 21 time trial.

=== 1993: Second Tour-Giro double ===
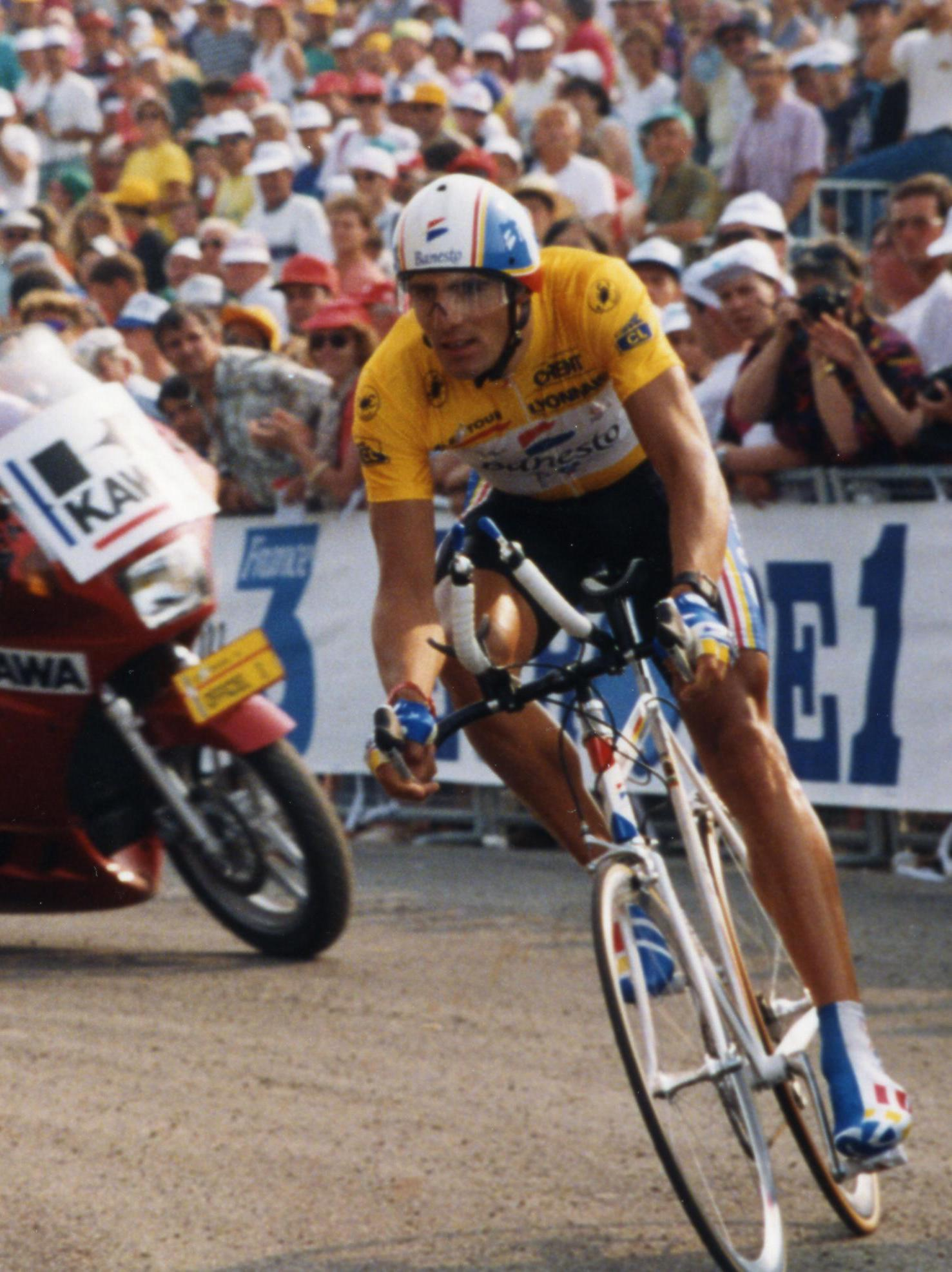
Induráin at the 1993 Tour de France

Induráin rode the same way in the 1993 Tour. He won the prologue at Puy-du-Fou, in the Vendée region, and waited until the ninth stage, the 59 km time trial at Lac de Madine, to take control of the race. He won by 2m 11s. From then on, said Ollivier, he rode defensively, watching Tony Rominger, whom he considered a rival against the clock. Ollivier said Induráin's ride wasn't without effort but another historian, Pierre Chany, said it lacked audacity and that Induráin never "did anything unprovoked which would have allowed this exceptional rider to rise above the rest and excite the crowd".

He won the 1993 Giro d'Italia.

=== 1994: Tour and hour record ===
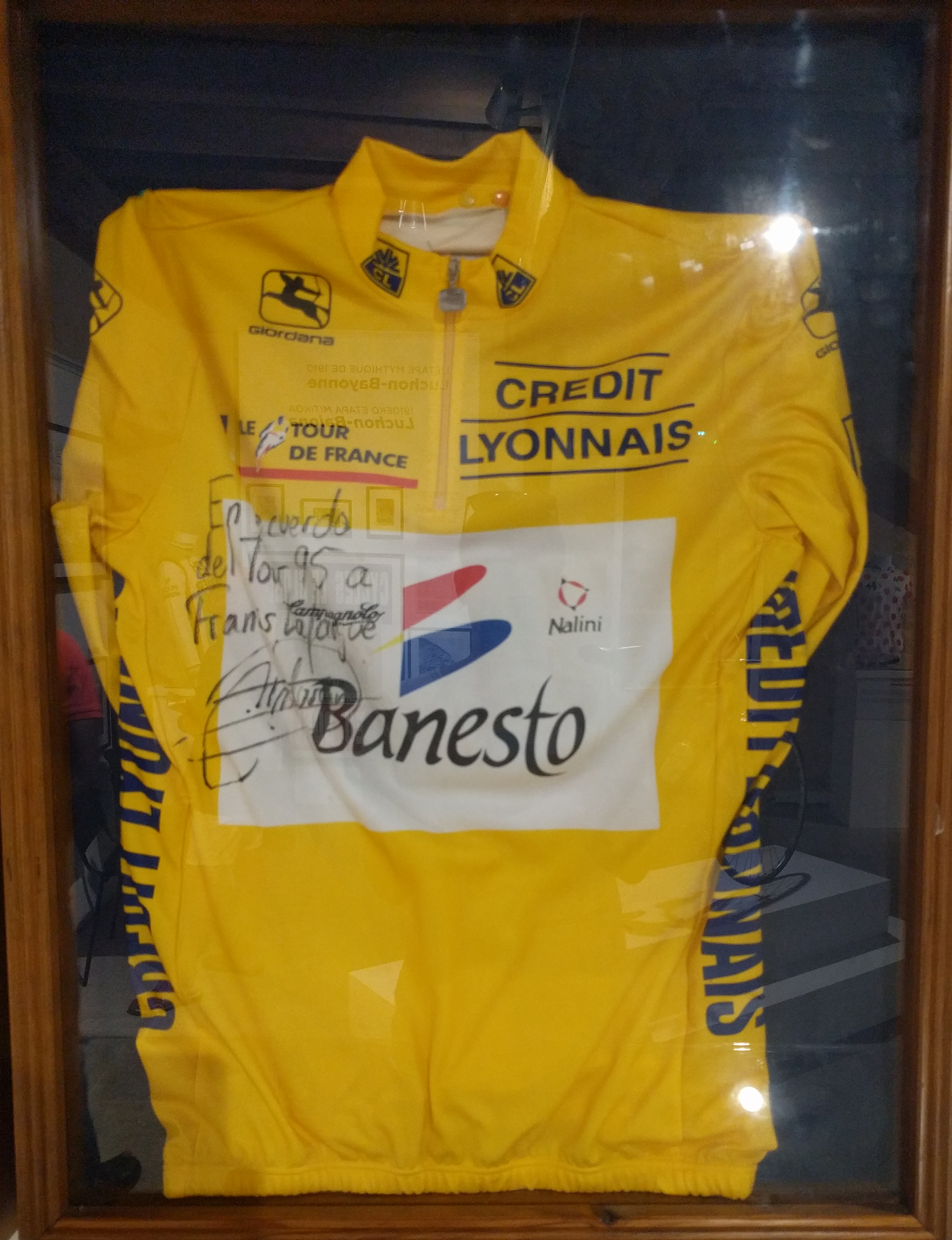
Induráin's yellow jersey, 1995 Tour de France.

Induráin again won the first time trial, the ninth stage from Périgueux to Bergerac, in the southwest. He beat Rominger by two minutes. He did, however, attack in the Pyrenees, accelerating at the foot of the 10 km climb to the ski station at Hautacam. Luc Leblanc, Richard Virenque, Marco Pantani and Armand de Las Cuevas stayed with him but other rivals, including Rominger, were left behind. Induráin lost the stage to Leblanc but kept the yellow jersey to the end.

In 1994 he set a world hour record of 53.040 kilometres (32.958 mi), beating Graeme Obree.

Induráin entered the Giro again, but this time was beaten by Evgeni Berzin and Marco Pantani, who had prepared solely for the Giro.

In May 1994, Induráin tested positive for salbutamol following the Tour de L'Oise in France. Though the β2-adrenergic agonist, found in nasal inhalers, was on the controlled substances list of both the IOC and UCI, both organizations permitted sportsmen with asthma to use it. However, in France there was an outright ban on its use. The IOC agreed with the UCI that Induráin would not be punished for using a drug banned outright in France because they accepted the salbutamol was contained in a nasal inhaler he had been using legitimately to aid his respiration. In Spain, the incident was interpreted as another case of the French attempting to hinder Induráin's domination of the sport.

=== 1995: Fifth Tour victory ===
He also won the Critérium du Dauphiné Libéré in 1995.

The seventh stage of the 1995 Tour linked Charleroi and Liège, both in southern Belgium. It took in the rolling roads of Liège–Bastogne–Liège. Induráin attacked with Johan Bruyneel following and the rest were left 50 seconds behind. The following day Induráin won the first time trial, organised on a demanding circuit at Seraing. Jean-Paul Ollivier wrote: "It offered him another chance to assert his authority. Who could challenge him? The hierarchy established itself by itself. Induráin once again set off on a demonstration Tour. This last victory by the rider from Navarra was a model of strength, intelligence and authority, all well controlled. There wasn't a tactical error, never a scare, no moments of weakness".

Induráin won the world time trial championship.

=== 1996: Aiming for sixth Tour victory ===
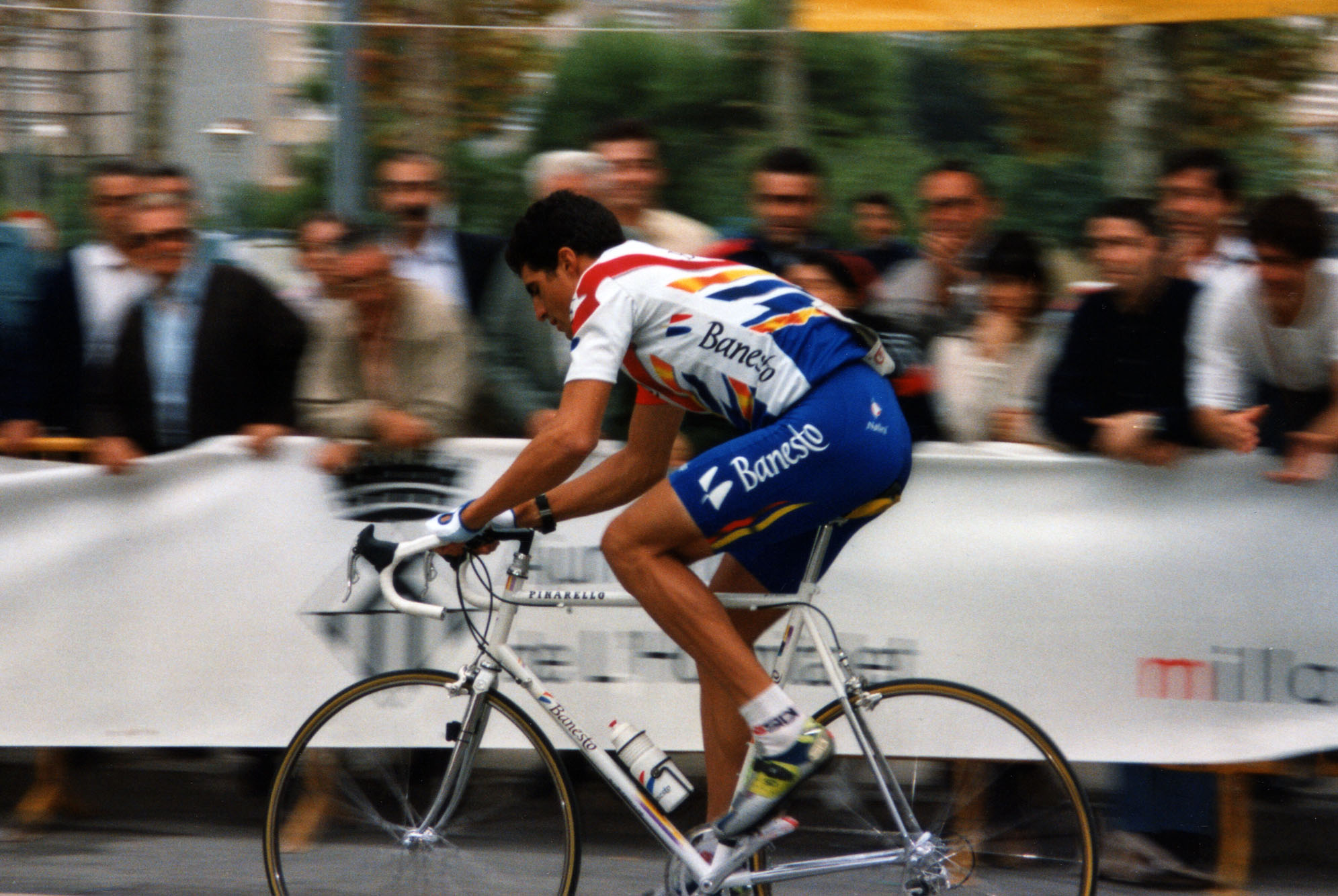
Miguel Induráin in the 1996 Criterium Ciutat de L'Hospitalet

He also won the Critérium du Dauphiné Libéré in 1996.

Induráin aimed for a sixth victory in the 1996 Tour, but suffered from the beginning. He came seventh in the prologue. After bronchitis in a cold and wet first week, he lost time from stage seven. He said that, on the Cormet de Roselend on 6 July, "my legs started to feel odd but, because the speed of the group wasn't very high, I didn't take much notice. I even imagined attacking at the foot of the Arcs climbs." He dropped out of the group and lost three minutes in three kilometres. Race referees penalised him 20 seconds for accepting a bottle of drink in the last kilometre. (Note: Race rules forbid team managers to approach riders at the end of the race to avoid their cars interfering with the race or making it unsafe.) He said the 20 seconds were nothing compared to the minute he would have lost had he not taken the bottle. He later said he would stop racing. The Dane Bjarne Riis won and his teammate Jan Ullrich finished second. Induráin finished 11th and, in a stage passing through his hometown and ending in Pamplona, he finished 19th, eight minutes behind the stage winner.

He won the individual time trial in the 1996 Olympic Games in Atlanta, where professionals competed for the first time. He won the title ahead of compatriot Abraham Olano and Boardman. Asked if he would trade his gold medal for a sixth Tour victory, he confirmed, saying: "For any professional cyclist, winning the Tour is the pinnacle of their career, whereas winning the Olympic title is purely symbolic". In the road race, he finished 26th.

In September 1996, Induráin rode the Vuelta a España at the insistence of his team. He dropped out unexpectedly on the Mirador del Fito, 30 km (19 mi) from the end of the stage to Covadonga. Relations with his team manager, José Miguel Echavarri, had been difficult since an aborted attempt on the hour record in Colombia in October 1995. The two are no longer on speaking terms.

== Retirement ==
Induráin took two months to consider his future, particularly the €4.5 million that Manolo Saiz was said to have offered him to transfer to the ONCE team. Negotiations foundered over which races Induráin would ride and whether Saiz would pay more. However, on 1 January 1997 he told 300 journalists and others in the El Toro hotel in Pamplona that he would not race again. "This is a long and deeply meditated decision, especially as physically I'm in condition to win a sixth Tour", he said. "In early 1996 I decided it was time to go, and I tried to win the Tour for the last time. When I didn't, I thought the Olympics would be the perfect way of bowing out, but what happened after the Vuelta a España made me change my mind. Every year it gets harder and I think I have spent enough time in the sport. My family is waiting." After reading a prepared 30-line statement, he left without taking questions.

Induráin now divides his time between his native Pamplona and his house in Palma de Mallorca, on the Mediterranean. He and his wife, Marisa, have three children. He founded the Miguel Induráin Foundation in 1998 to promote sport in his home region of Navarra. He worked with the Spanish Olympic Committee to promote Sevilla's candidature for the 2004 Olympics, and the Union Cycliste Internationale. He continues to ride a bike three or four times a week. He attends cyclotourist events such as L'Étape du Tour, the Mallorca312 and the Cape Argus Pick & Pay Cycle Tour in Cape Town, South Africa.

== Physiology ==
According to the University of Ferrara, which conducted tests on Induráin, his strength came from his body's superior physiology. His blood carried 7 litres of oxygen around his body per minute, compared to 3–4 litres for an ordinary person and 5–6 litres for fellow riders. His cardiac output was 50 litres a minute; a fit amateur cyclist's is about 25 litres. Induráin's lung capacity was 7.8 litres, compared to an average of 6 litres. His resting pulse was as low as 28 BPM, compared to an average 60–72 bpm, which meant his heart would be less strained in the tough mountain stages. His VO_{2} max was 88 ml/kg/min; in comparison, Lance Armstrong's was 83.8 ml/kg/min and Greg LeMond's was more than 92 ml/kg/min.

He consulted the Italian professor Francesco Conconi (famous for pioneering EPO use in sport) from 1987 and his weight dropped from 85 kg (187 lb) to 78 kg (172 lb) under his guidance, "changing himself into an all-round rider", said Philippe Brunel in L'Équipe. He was 10 kg (22 lb) lighter than when he was a junior.

Induráin was subjected to further physical testing at age 46, 14 years after his retirement, in a 2012 published study to determine age-related fitness decline. His maximal values were oxygen uptake 5.29 L/min (57.4 mL · kg-1 · min-1) and aerobic power output 450 W (4.88 W/kg) and was found to have seen greater changes in body composition than aerobic capacity as he weighed 92 kg at the time. However, his absolute maximal and submaximal oxygen uptake and power output in 2012 still compared favorably with those exhibited by active professional cyclists.

=== Critics ===
Although Induráin, who has always denied doping, has never been banned or given a positive test for any sports-enhancing drug, some remain skeptical of his achievements. Anti-doping expert Sandro Donati released information showing Induráin and his Banesto team were clients of Dr. Francesco Conconi, who was later found to be doping many of his cyclist clients. The Banesto team confirmed it met Conconi but only to conduct Conconi tests on its cyclists. Former Festina coach Antonie Vayer has also cast doubt on Induráin's abilities, claiming only "mutants" could have performed at the level he did.

== Personality ==
Induráin resisted comparison to Tour champions of the past and said he "never felt superior to anyone". He "never had airs about himself and only reluctantly stepped into the limelight that came with the maillot jaune [yellow jersey]", Andy Hood wrote in Procycling.

Induráin was a man who was known as difficult to know. He was modest and quiet, "governing his troops without ever being demanding." A Spanish journalist, frustrated that he could find nothing interesting about him, asked "I wonder if his wife knows who this man is who sleeps beside her." A teammate, Jean-François Bernard said: "When he comes down for his meal, you don't even hear him move his chair."

The magazine Procycling wrote "His five straight Tour crowns paralleled Spain's coming of age following decades of repression under the dictatorship of General Franco and his face became a symbol of a new, more assertive Spain stepping confidently on to the European stage".

Philippe Brunel in L'Équipe called him "humble and sublime, taciturn some days. But who was this robotic athlete who, in his streamlined helmet and his Plexiglass visor, dominated [domestiquait] the time-trials like no one before him except perhaps Jacques Anquetil?"

The magazine Cycling Weekly wrote: "He seems to do everything very slowly, as though he is trying to conserve energy even here. His eyes blink at half-speed but the gaze from his brown eyes is steady. He looks as relaxed off the bike as he does when he is on it, but you are aware that you are in the presence of a great bike rider."

Induráin said the man who most impressed him was Pope John Paul II, to whom he gave a yellow jersey from the Tour de France and a pink jersey from the Giro d'Italia. It is rare for genuine items from his cycling career to be in another's collection, as he keeps most of his clothing, equipment etc., making such gifts special.

Induráin is a member of the Laureus World Sports Academy.

== Decorations ==
- Prince of Asturias Award for Sports
- Grand Cross of the Royal Order of Sporting Merit
- Grand Cross of the Order of Civil Merit
- French Legion of Honour
- Olympic Order

== Career achievements ==
=== Major results ===
1983
1st Road race, National Amateur Road Championships
1984
1st Stage 10 (ITT) Tour de l'Avenir
4th Overall Vuelta a La Rioja
1985
Tour de l'Avenir

1st Stages 6a & 10 (ITT)

2nd Overall Vuelta a Andalucía
1986
1st Overall Tour de l'Avenir

1st Prologue & Stage 9 (ITT)

1st Overall Vuelta a Murcia

1st Prologue

5th Overall Vuelta a Andalucía
6th Overall Grand Prix du Midi Libre
6th Road race, National Road Championships
1987
1st Overall Vuelta a los Valles Mineros

1st Stages 2, 3 & 5

1st GP Navarra
1st Prologue Vuelta a Murcia
1st Stage 1 Volta a Galicia
3rd Overall Setmana Catalana de Ciclisme

1st Points classification
1st Stages 4b (ITT) & 5

1988
1st Overall Volta a Catalunya

1st Stage 6a (ITT)

1st Stage 4a Vuelta a Cantabria
3rd Overall Volta a Galicia

1st Stage 2

6th Clásica de San Sebastián
8th Overall Setmana Catalana de Ciclisme
1989
1st Overall Paris–Nice
1st Overall Critérium International

1st Stage 3 (ITT)

1st Stage 9 Tour de France
2nd Subida al Naranco
7th La Flèche Wallonne
10th Overall Tour de Suisse
10th Overall Volta a Catalunya
10th Liège–Bastogne–Liège
1990
1st Overall Paris–Nice

1st Stage 6

1st Clásica de San Sebastián
2nd Overall Vuelta a Burgos

1st Points classification
1st Stage 4

2nd Overall Vuelta Asturias
3rd Overall Tour of the Basque Country

1st Stage 5a

3rd Road race, National Road Championships
4th Overall Euskal Bizikleta
4th La Flèche Wallonne
5th Trofeo Luis Puig
7th Overall Vuelta a España
7th Overall Critérium International
9th Overall Vuelta Ciclista a la Communidad Valenciana

1st Stage 5

10th Overall Tour de France

1st Stage 16

1991
1st Overall Tour de France

1st Stages 8 (ITT) & 21 (ITT)

1st Overall Volta a Catalunya

1st Stage 5 (ITT)

1st Overall Tour du Vaucluse

1st Stage 2

2nd Overall Vuelta a España
3rd Overall Euskal Bizikleta

1st Stages 2 & 5

3rd Road race, UCI Road World Championships
3rd Boucles de l'Aulne
4th Liège–Bastogne–Liège
1992
1st Overall UCI Road World Rankings
1st Road race, National Road Championships
1st Overall Tour de France

1st Prologue, Stages 9 (ITT) & 19 (ITT)

1st Overall Giro d'Italia

1st Intergiro classification
1st Stages 3 (ITT) & 21 (ITT)

1st Overall Volta a Catalunya
1st Boucles de l'Aulne
1st Stage 1a (ITT) Vuelta Castilla y Leon
2nd Overall Tour de Romandie

1st Stage 4b (ITT)

3rd Overall Paris–Nice
3rd Overall Tour de l'Oise
4th Overall Vuelta a Aragón
5th Subida al Naranco
6th Road race, UCI Road World Championships
1993
1st Overall UCI Road World Rankings
1st Overall Tour de France

1st Prologue & Stage 9 (ITT)

1st Overall Giro d'Italia

1st Stages 10 (ITT) & 19 (ITT)

1st Overall Vuelta Castilla y Leon

1st Stage 1a

1st Clásica a los Puertos de Guadarrama
1st Stage 6 (ITT) Vuelta a Murcia
Vuelta a los Valles Mineros

1st Stages 2 & 4

2nd Road race, UCI Road World Championships
2nd Road race, National Road Championships
3rd Overall Vuelta Ciclista a la Communidad Valenciana
4th Overall Volta a Catalunya
8th Grand Prix of Aargau Canton
1994
Best human effort: 53.040 km
1st Overall Tour de France

1st Stage 9 (ITT)

1st Overall Tour de l'Oise

1st Stage 4 (ITT)

1st Stage 3 Vuelta Castilla y Leon
2nd Overall Vuelta Ciclista a la Communidad Valenciana

1st Stage 6 (ITT)

3rd Overall Giro d'Italia
1995
UCI Road World Championships

1st Time trial
2nd Road race

1st Overall Tour de France

1st Stages 8 (ITT) & 19 (ITT)

1st Overall Critérium du Dauphiné Libéré

1st Stage 3 (ITT)

1st Overall Grand Prix du Midi Libre
1st Overall Volta a Galicia

1st Stage 1

1st Overall Vuelta Ciclista a La Rioja

1st Stage 1a

1st Stage 5a Vuelta a Aragón
3rd Overall Vuelta a Asturias

1st Prologue & Stage 5

3rd Overall Vuelta a los Valles Mineros

1st Stage 4

6th Classique des Alpes
9th Clásica de San Sebastián
1996
1st Time trial, Olympic Games
1st Overall Critérium du Dauphiné Libéré

1st Stages 5 (ITT) & 6

1st Overall Volta ao Alentejo

1st Prologue & Stage 4

1st Overall Vuelta a Asturias

1st Prologue

1st Overall Euskal Bizikleta

1st Stage 5

2nd Overall Vuelta a Burgos
4th Overall Vuelta a Aragón
8th Classique des Alpes

==== General classification results timeline ====
Grand Tour general classification results
| Grand Tour | 1985 | 1986 | 1987 | 1988 | 1989 | 1990 | 1991 | 1992 | 1993 | 1994 | 1995 | 1996 |
| Giro d'Italia | — | — | — | — | — | — | — | 1 | 1 | 3 | — | — |
| Tour de France | DNF | DNF | 97 | 47 | 17 | 10 | 1 | 1 | 1 | 1 | 1 | 11 |
| Vuelta a España | 84 | 92 | DNF | DNF | DNF | 7 | 2 | — | — | — | — | DNF |
Major stage race general classification results
| Major stage race | 1985 | 1986 | 1987 | 1988 | 1989 | 1990 | 1991 | 1992 | 1993 | 1994 | 1995 | 1996 |
| Paris–Nice | — | — | — | 42 | 1 | 1 | — | 3 | — | 35 | — | — |
| / Tirreno–Adriatico | — | — | — | — | — | — | 43 | — | — | — | — | — |
| Tour of the Basque Country | — | 22 | — | — | — | 3 | — | — | 54 | — | — | — |
| Tour de Romandie | — | — | — | — | — | — | — | 2 | 15 | 35 | — | — |
| Critérium du Dauphiné | — | — | — | — | — | — | — | — | — | — | 1 | 1 |
| Tour de Suisse | — | — | — | — | 10 | — | — | — | — | — | — | — |
| Volta a Catalunya | — | — | DNF | 1 | 10 | DNF | 1 | 1 | 4 | — | — | — |

Legend
| — | Did not compete |
| DNF | Did not finish |

==== Grand Tour record ====
| | 1985 | 1986 | 1987 | 1988 | 1989 | 1990 | 1991 | 1992 | 1993 | 1994 | 1995 | 1996 |
| Giro d'Italia | DNE | DNE | DNE | DNE | DNE | DNE | DNE | 1 | 1 | 3 | DNE | DNE |
| Stages won | — | — | — | — | — | — | — | 2 | 2 | 0 | — | — |
| Points classification | — | — | — | — | — | — | — | 2 | 3 | 4 | — | — |
| Mountains classification | — | — | — | — | — | — | — | 3 | 3 | 25 | — | — |
| Tour de France | DNF-4 | DNF-12 | 97 | 47 | 17 | 10 | 1 | 1 | 1 | 1 | 1 | 11 |
| Stages won | 0 | 0 | 0 | 0 | 1 | 1 | 2 | 3 (Note: Includes the prologue which Induráin won.) | 2 | 1 | 2 | 0 |
| Points classification | — | — | NR | NR | NR | 10 | 16 | 6 | 8 | 7 | 3 | 19 |
| Mountains classification | — | — | NR | NR | 8 | 4 | 5 | 4 | 4 | 4 | 4 | 12 |
| Young rider classification | — | — | 10 | 6 | — | — | — | — | — | — | — | — |
| Vuelta a España | 84 | 92 | DNF | DNF | DNF | 7 | 2 | DNE | DNE | DNE | DNE | DNF-13 |
| Points classification | NR | NR | — | — | — | NR | 4 | — | — | — | — | — |

Legend
| 1 | Winner |
| 2–3 | Top three-finish |
| 4–10 | Top ten-finish |
| 11– | Other finish |
| DNE | Did not enter |
| DNF-x | Did not finish (retired on stage x) |
| DNS-x | Did not start (not started on stage x) |
| HD-x | Finished outside time limit (occurred on stage x) |
| DSQ | Disqualified |
| N/A | Race/classification not held |
| NR | Not ranked in this classification |

== Notes ==
Awards and achievements
| Preceded by (Ukraine) Sergei Bubka | Prince of Asturias Award for Sports; 1992 | Succeeded by (Cuba) Javier Sotomayor |
| Preceded by Kevin Young | United Press International; Athlete of the Year; 1993 | Succeeded by Johan Olav Koss |
