= Beat Breu =

Swiss cyclist

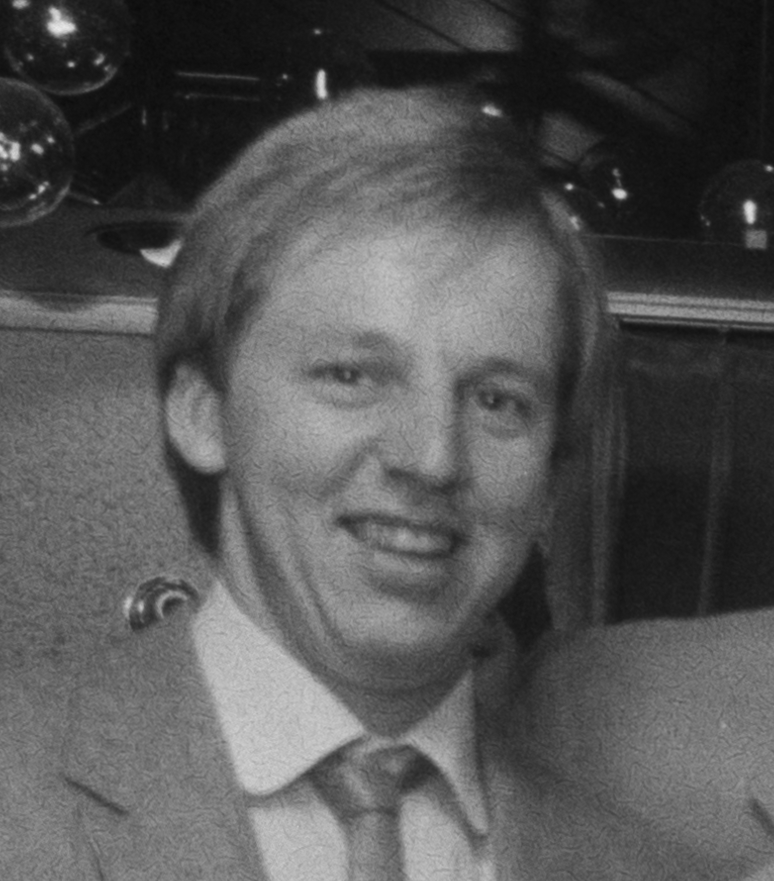
- Breu in 1984

Personal information
- Full name: Beat Breu
- Born: 23 October 1957 (age 68) St. Gallen, Switzerland

Cycling career
- Sport: Cycling
- Disciplines: Cyclo-cross; Road
- Role: Rider
- Rider type: Climbing specialist

Professional teams
- 1979: Willora–Piz Buin–Bonanza
- 1980: TI–Raleigh–Creda
- 1981–1984: Cilo–Aufina
- 1985–1986: Carrera–Inoxpran
- 1987–1988: Isotonic–Cyndarella
- 1989–1990: Domex–Weinmann
- 1991–1995: Appenzeller Käse
- 1992: Bleiker

Major wins
- Grand Tours Tour de France 2 individual stages (1982) Giro d'Italia 1 individual stage (1981) Stage races Tour de Suisse (1981, 1989) One-day races and Classics Züri-Metzgete (1981)
Medal record
Men's cyclo-cross
World Championships
Bronze medal – third place	1988 Hägendorf	Elite Men's Race

Beat Breu (born 23 October 1957, in St. Gallen) is a Swiss former road bicycle racer. In 1982 Tour de France he won the prestigious stage on Alpe d'Huez, as well as another mountain stage finishing in Saint-Lary-Soulan, and finished sixth overall. This double strike earned Beat Breu the nickname "Mountain Flea". He also won Tour de Suisse two times and a stage in 1981 Giro d'Italia. In later life in 2019 he fulfilled his childhood dream of having his own circus.

== Major results ==
1981
1st Overall Tour de Suisse

1st Stages 3b & 7b

1st Züri-Metzgete
8th Overall Giro d'Italia

1st Stage 20

1982
4th Overall Tour de Suisse

1st Stage 4b

6th Overall Tour de France

1st Stages 13 &16

1983
10th Overall Tour de Suisse
10th GP du canton d'Argovie
1984
6th Overall Tour de Suisse

1st Stage 2

8th Overall Giro d'Italia
8th Overall Tour de Romandie
1985
5th Overall Tour de Suisse
8th Overall Tour de Romandie
1986
6th GP du canton d'Argovie
9th Overall Tour de Romandie
1987
6th Overall Tour de Romandie

1st Stage 4

1988
1st National Cyclo-cross Championships
3rd UCI Cyclo-cross World Championships
7th Overall Tour de Romandie
1989
1st Overall Tour de Suisse

1st Stage 5b (ITT)

1994
1st National Cyclo-cross Championships

=== Grand Tour general classification results timeline ===
Grand Tour	1979	1980	1981	1982	1983	1984	1985	1986	1987	1988	1989	1990
Vuelta a España	—	—	—	—	—	—	—	—	—	—	—	—
Giro d'Italia	23	—	8	—	—	8	—	—	—	11	—	—
Tour de France	—	—	—	6	22	43	23	74	26	—	21	42

== Trivia ==
- At the Velomuseum Fribourg in Switzerland there is a miniature model of Breu's stage win up Alpe d'Huez (Tour de France) in 1982, made by Beat Breu himself.
- The Swiss dialect pop band DACHS dedicated a song to Beat Breu. The single, titled Beat Breu, was released in November 2019.
