= 1987 La Flèche Wallonne =

Race details
- Dates: 15 April 1987
- Stages: 1
- Distance: 245 km (152.2 mi)
- Winning time: 6h 19' 23"

Results
	Winner	Jean-Claude Leclercq (FRA)	(Toshiba–Look)
	Second	Claude Criquielion (BEL)	(Hitachi–Marc)
	Third	Rolf Gölz (FRG)	(Superconfex–Kwantum–Yoko–Colnago)

The 1987 La Flèche Wallonne was the 51st edition of La Flèche Wallonne cycle race and was held on 15 April 1987. The race started in Spa and finished in Huy. The race was won by Jean-Claude Leclercq of the Toshiba team.

== General classification ==
Final general classification

Rank	Rider	Team	Time
1	Jean-Claude Leclercq (FRA)	Toshiba–Look	6h 19' 23"
2	Claude Criquielion (BEL)	Hitachi–Marc	+ 26"
3	Rolf Gölz (FRG)	Superconfex–Kwantum–Yoko–Colnago	+ 51"
4	Stephen Roche (IRL)	Carrera Jeans–Vagabond	+ 56"
5	Yvon Madiot (FRA)	Système U	+ 1' 07"
6	Paul Watson (GBR)	ANC–Halfords	+ 1' 22"
7	Dag Otto Lauritzen (NOR)	7-Eleven	+ 1' 29"
8	Martial Gayant (FRA)	Système U	+ 1' 45"
9	Alberto Volpi (ITA)	Gewiss–Bianchi	+ 1' 58"
10	Moreno Argentin (ITA)	Gewiss–Bianchi	+ 2' 30"
