= 1987 Omloop Het Volk =

Race details
- Dates: 28 February 1987
- Stages: 1
- Distance: 237 km (147 mi)
- Winning time: 6h 06' 00"

Results
	Winner	Teun van Vliet (NED)
	Second	Steven Rooks (NED)
	Third	Jan Goessens (BEL)

The 1987 Omloop Het Volk was the 42nd edition of the Omloop Het Volk cycle race and was held on 28 February 1987.
The race started and finished in Sint-Amandsberg. 198 riders started the race, only 63 finished. The race was won by Teun van Vliet.

== General classification ==
Final general classification
Rank	Rider	Team	Time
1	Teun van Vliet (NED)	Panasonic–Isostar	6h 06' 00"
2	Steven Rooks (NED)	PDM–Concorde	+ 0"
3	Jan Goessens (BEL)	Lotto–Eddy Merckx	+ 0"
4	John Talen (NED)	Panasonic–Isostar	+ 7"
5	Eric Vanderaerden (BEL)	Panasonic–Isostar	+ 7"
6	Rolf Gölz (FRG)	Superconfex–Yoko	+ 7"
7	Eddy Planckaert (BEL)	Panasonic–Isostar	+ 7"
8	Herman Frison (BEL)	Roland Skala TW	+ 7"
9	Marc Sergeant (BEL)	Lotto–Eddy Merckx	+ 7"
10	Peter Stevenhaagen (NED)	PDM–Concorde	+ 7"
