= 1984 Giro di Lombardia =

Race details
- Dates: 13 October 1984
- Stages: 1
- Distance: 251 km (156.0 mi)
- Winning time: 6h 08' 50"

Results
	Winner	Bernard Hinault (FRA)	(La Vie Claire)
	Second	Ludo Peeters (BEL)	(Kwantum–Decosol–Yoko)
	Third	Teun van Vliet (NED)	(Verandalux–Dries)

The 1984 Giro di Lombardia was the 78th edition of the Giro di Lombardia cycle race and was held on 13 October 1984. The race started in Milan and finished in Como. The race was won by Bernard Hinault of the La Vie Claire team.

== General classification ==
Final general classification

Rank	Rider	Team	Time
1	Bernard Hinault (FRA)	La Vie Claire	6h 08' 50"
2	Ludo Peeters (BEL)	Kwantum–Decosol–Yoko	+ 58"
3	Teun van Vliet (NED)	Verandalux–Dries	+ 58"
4	Tommy Prim (SWE)	Bianchi–Piaggio	+ 58"
5	Stephen Roche (IRL)	La Redoute	+ 58"
6	Adri van der Poel (NED)	Kwantum–Decosol–Yoko	+ 58"
7	Claude Criquielion (BEL)	Splendor–Mondial Moquettes–Marc	+ 2' 27"
8	Jørgen Pedersen (DEN)	Carrera–Inoxpran	+ 2' 27"
9	Emanuele Bombini (ITA)	Del Tongo–Colnago	+ 2' 27"
10	Iñaki Gastón (ESP)	Reynolds	+ 2' 34"
