= 1988 La Flèche Wallonne =

Cycle race

Race details
- Dates: 13 April 1988
- Stages: 1
- Distance: 243 km (151.0 mi)
- Winning time: 6h 32' 21"

Results
	Winner	Rolf Gölz (FRG)	(Superconfex–Yoko–Opel–Colnago)
	Second	Moreno Argentin (ITA)	(Gewiss–Bianchi)
	Third	Steven Rooks (NED)	(PDM–Ultima–Concorde)

The 1988 La Flèche Wallonne was the 52nd edition of La Flèche Wallonne cycle race and was held on 13 April 1988. The race started in Spa and finished in Huy. The race was won by Rolf Gölz of the Superconfex team.

== General classification ==
Final general classification

Rank	Rider	Team	Time
1	Rolf Gölz (FRG)	Superconfex–Yoko–Opel–Colnago	6h 32' 21"
2	Moreno Argentin (ITA)	Gewiss–Bianchi	+ 56"
3	Steven Rooks (NED)	PDM–Ultima–Concorde	+ 1' 02"
4	Charly Mottet (FRA)	Système U–Gitane	+ 1' 12"
5	Andreas Kappes (FRG)	Toshiba–Look	+ 1' 23"
6	Bruno Bruyere (BEL)	Hitachi–Bosal–B.C.E. Snooker	+ 3' 38"
7	Yvon Madiot (FRA)	Toshiba–Look	+ 3' 43"
8	Pedro Delgado (ESP)	Reynolds	+ 3' 43"
9	Stephan Joho (SUI)	Ariostea–Gres	+ 3' 43"
10	Jan Nevens (BEL)	Sigma–Fina	+ 3' 43"
