= 1990 Clásica de San Sebastián =

Race details
- Dates: 11 August 1990
- Stages: 1
- Distance: 248 km (154.1 mi)
- Winning time: 6h 19' 59"

Results
	Winner	Miguel Induráin (ESP)	(Banesto)
	Second	Laurent Jalabert (FRA)	(Toshiba)
	Third	Sean Kelly (IRL)	(PDM–Concorde–Ultima)

The 1990 Clásica de San Sebastián was the 10th edition of the Clásica de San Sebastián cycle race and was held on 11 August 1990. The race started and finished in San Sebastián. The race was won by Miguel Induráin of the Banesto team.

== General classification ==
Final general classification

Rank	Rider	Team	Time
1	Miguel Induráin (ESP)	Banesto	6h 19' 59"
2	Laurent Jalabert (FRA)	Toshiba	+ 2' 24"
3	Sean Kelly (IRL)	PDM–Concorde–Ultima	+ 2' 24"
4	Tony Rominger (SUI)	Chateau d'Ax–Salotti	+ 2' 24"
5	Federico Echave (ESP)	CLAS–Cajastur	+ 2' 29"
6	Steve Bauer (CAN)	7-Eleven	+ 2' 29"
7	Enrique Aja (ESP)	Teka	+ 2' 29"
8	Jesús Rodríguez Magro (ESP)	Banesto	+ 2' 29"
9	Pascal Richard (SUI)	Helvetia–La Suisse	+ 2' 29"
10	Marino Lejarreta (ESP)	ONCE	+ 2' 29"
