= 1988 Amstel Gold Race =

Road bicycle race in the Netherlands

The 1988 Amstel Gold Race was the 23rd edition of the annualAmstel Gold Race road bicycle race, held on Sunday April 23, 1988, in the Dutch province of Limburg. The race stretched 242 kilometres, with the start in Heerlen and the finish in Meerssen. There were a total of 169 competitors, with 96 cyclists finishing the race.

== Result ==
Final result (1–10)
| Rank | Rider | Time |
|---|---|---|
| 1 | Jelle Nijdam (NED) | 6h 28' 42" |
| 2 | Steven Rooks (NED) | + 17" |
| 3 | Claude Criquielion (BEL) | + 17" |
| 4 | Éric Boyer (FRA) | + 17" |
| 5 | Marc Sergeant (BEL) | + 26" |
| 6 | Steve Bauer (CAN) | + 42" |
| 7 | Dag Otto Lauritzen (NOR) | + 42" |
| 8 | Bruno Cornillet (FRA) | + 42" |
| 9 | Martial Gayant (FRA) | + 42" |
| 10 | Rolf Gölz (FRG) | + 1' 01" |
