= Hinault =

Hinault is a surname. Notable people with the surname include:

- Bernard Hinault (born 1954), French cyclist
- Sébastien Hinault (born 1974), French cyclist
