= 1984 Tour de Romandie =

Race details
- Dates: 8–13 May 1984
- Stages: 6 + Prologue
- Distance: 869.75 km (540.44 mi)
- Winning time: 24h 35' 15"

Results
	Winner	Stephen Roche (IRL)	(La Redoute)
	Second	Jean-Marie Grezet (SUI)	(Skil–Reydel–Sem–Mavic)
	Third	Niki Rüttimann (SUI)	(La Vie Claire)

The 1984 Tour de Romandie was the 38th edition of the Tour de Romandie cycle race and was held from 8 May to 13 May 1984. The race started in Meyrin and finished in Saint-Imier. The race was won by Stephen Roche of the La Redoute team.

== General classification ==
Final general classification
Rank	Rider	Team	Time
1	Stephen Roche (IRL)	La Redoute	24h 35' 15"
2	Jean-Marie Grezet (SUI)	Skil–Reydel–Sem–Mavic	+ 0"
3	Niki Rüttimann (SUI)	La Vie Claire	+ 45"
4	Pascal Simon (FRA)	Peugeot–Shell–Michelin	+ 52"
5	Robert Millar (GBR)	Peugeot–Shell–Michelin	+ 1' 24"
6	Steven Rooks (NED)	Panasonic–Raleigh	+ 2' 32"
7	Laurent Fignon (FRA)	Renault–Elf	+ 2' 49"
8	Beat Breu (SUI)	Cilo–Aufina–Crans–Montana	+ 4' 25"
9	Charly Mottet (FRA)	Renault–Elf	+ 4' 40"
10	Mike Gutmann (SUI)	La Vie Claire	+ 7' 11"
