= 1987 Amstel Gold Race =

Dutch cycling race

The 1987 Amstel Gold Race was the 22nd edition of the annual Amstel Gold Race road bicycle race, held on Sunday 25 April 1987 in the Dutch province of Limburg. The race stretched 242 kilometres, with the start in Heerlen and the finish in Meerssen. There were a total of 163 competitors, with 70 cyclists finishing the race.

== Result ==
Final result (1–10)
Rank	Rider	Time
1	Joop Zoetemelk (NED)	6h 12' 51"
2	Steven Rooks (NED)	+ 30"
3	Malcolm Elliott (GBR)	+ 32"
4	Teun van Vliet (NED)	+ 34"
5	Bruno Cornillet (FRA)	+ 40"
6	Phil Anderson (AUS)	+ 1' 34"
7	Eddy Planckaert (BEL)	+ 1' 37"
8	Nico Verhoeven (NED)	+ 1' 37"
9	Adri van der Poel (NED)	+ 1' 37"
10	Theo de Rooij (NED)	+ 1' 41"
