= 1989 Paris–Nice =

Race details
- Dates: 5–12 March 1989
- Stages: 7 + Prologue
- Distance: 1,119.3 km (695.5 mi)
- Winning time: 28h 09' 05"

Results
Jersey awarded to the overall winner	Winner	Miguel Induráin (ESP)	(Reynolds)
	Second	Stephen Roche (IRL)	(Fagor–MBK)
	Third	Marc Madiot (FRA)	(Toshiba)

The 1989 Paris–Nice was the 47th edition of the Paris–Nice cycle race and was held from 5 March to 12 March 1989. The race started in Paris and finished at the Col d'Èze. The race was won by Miguel Induráin of the Reynolds team.

== Route ==
Stage characteristics and winners
Stage	Date	Course	Distance	Type	Winner
P	5 March	Paris	5.3 km (3.3 mi)	Individual time trial	Thierry Marie (FRA)
1	6 March	Gien to Moulins	167 km (104 mi)		Etienne De Wilde (BEL)
2	7 March	Moulins to Saint-Étienne	207 km (129 mi)		Etienne De Wilde (BEL)
3	8 March	Vergèze to Vergèze	58 km (36 mi)	Team time trial	Toshiba
4	9 March	Vergèze to Toulon/Mont Faron	203 km (126 mi)		Bruno Cornillet (FRA)
5	10 March	Toulon to Saint-Tropez	178 km (111 mi)		Gérard Rué (FRA)
6	11 March	Saint-Tropez to Mandelieu-la-Napoule	190 km (120 mi)		Adri van der Poel (NED)
7a	12 March	Mandelieu to Nice	101 km (63 mi)		Adriano Baffi (ITA)
7b	12 March	Nice to Col d'Èze	10 km (6.2 mi)	Individual time trial	Stephen Roche (IRL)

== General classification ==
Final general classification

Rank	Rider	Team	Time
1	Miguel Induráin (ESP)	Reynolds	28h 09' 05"
2	Stephen Roche (IRL)	Fagor–MBK	+ 13"
3	Marc Madiot (FRA)	Toshiba	+ 1' 33"
4	Peter Winnen (NED)	Panasonic–Isostar–Colnago–Agu	+ 1' 56"
5	Gérard Rué (FRA)	Super U–Raleigh–Fiat	+ 2' 25"
6	Jean-Claude Colotti (FRA)	RMO	+ 2' 26"
7	Giuseppe Petito (ITA)	Ariostea	+ 2' 26"
8	Éric Caritoux (FRA)	RMO	+ 2' 35"
9	Luc Roosen (BEL)	Histor–Sigma	+ 2' 55"
10	Martín Ramírez (COL)	Café de Colombia	+ 3' 02"
