= 1989 Tour de Suisse =

Race details
- Dates: 14–23 June 1989
- Stages: 10
- Distance: 1,846 km (1,147 mi)
- Winning time: 46h 57' 19"

Results
	Winner	Beat Breu (SUI)	(Domex–Weinmann)
	Second	Daniel Steiger (SUI)	(Frank–Toyo)
	Third	Jörg Muller (SUI)	(PDM–Ultima–Concorde)

The 1989 Tour de Suisse was the 53rd edition of the Tour de Suisse cycle race and was held from 14 June to 23 June 1989. The race started in Bern and finished in Zürich. The race was won by Beat Breu of the Domex–Weinmann team.

== General classification ==
Final general classification

Rank	Rider	Team	Time
1	Beat Breu (SUI)	Domex–Weinmann	46h 57' 19"
2	Daniel Steiger (SUI)	Frank–Toyo	+ 30"
3	Jörg Muller (SUI)	PDM–Ultima–Concorde	+ 49"
4	Steve Bauer (CAN)	Helvetia–La Suisse	+ 4' 33"
5	Rolf Järmann (SUI)	Frank–Toyo	+ 5' 26"
6	Stephan Joho (SUI)	Ariostea	+ 6' 52"
7	Daniel Wyder (SUI)	Eurocar–Mosoca	+ 10' 05"
8	Andreas Kappes (FRG)	Toshiba	+ 13' 48"
9	Johan Bruyneel (BEL)	SEFB	+ 13' 55"
10	Miguel Induráin (ESP)	Reynolds	+ 14' 15"
