= 1990 Tour of the Basque Country =

Race details
- Dates: 2–6 April 1990
- Stages: 5
- Distance: 824.5 km (512.3 mi)
- Winning time: 21h 01' 29"

Results
	Winner	Julián Gorospe (ESP)	(Banesto)
	Second	Rolf Gölz (FRG)	(Buckler–Colnago–Decca)
	Third	Miguel Induráin (ESP)	(Banesto)

The 1990 Tour of the Basque Country was the 30th edition of the Tour of the Basque Country cycle race and was held from 2 April to 6 April 1990. The race started in Zestoa and finished at Barrendiola. The race was won by Julián Gorospe of the Banesto team.

== General classification ==
Final general classification

Rank	Rider	Team	Time
1	Julián Gorospe (ESP)	Banesto	21h 01' 29"
2	Rolf Gölz (FRG)	Buckler–Colnago–Decca	+ 20"
3	Miguel Induráin (ESP)	Banesto	+ 22"
4	Iñaki Gastón (ESP)	CLAS–Cajastur	+ 33"
5	Tom Cordes (NED)	Buckler–Colnago–Decca	+ 34"
6	Stephen Roche (IRL)	Histor–Sigma	+ 36"
7	Pello Ruiz Cabestany (ESP)	ONCE	+ 39"
8	Raúl Alcalá (MEX)	PDM–Concorde–Ultima	+ 41"
9	Jaanus Kuum (NOR)	Teka	+ 46"
10	Erik Breukink (NED)	PDM–Concorde–Ultima	+ 49"
