= 1989 La Flèche Wallonne =

Race details
- Dates: 12 April 1989
- Stages: 1
- Distance: 253 km (157.2 mi)
- Winning time: 6h 29' 30"

Results
	Winner	Claude Criquielion (BEL)	(Hitachi)
	Second	Steven Rooks (NED)	(PDM–Ultima–Concorde)
	Third	Wim Van Eynde (BEL)	(Lotto–Vlaanderen–Jong–Mbk–Merckx)

The 1989 La Flèche Wallonne was the 53rd edition of La Flèche Wallonne cycle race and was held on 12 April 1989. The race started in Spa and finished in Huy. The race was won by Claude Criquielion of the Hitachi team.

== General classification ==
Final general classification

Rank	Rider	Team	Time
1	Claude Criquielion (BEL)	Hitachi	6h 29' 30"
2	Steven Rooks (NED)	PDM–Ultima–Concorde	+ 13"
3	Wim Van Eynde (BEL)	Lotto–Vlaanderen–Jong–Mbk–Merckx	+ 46"
4	Sammie Moreels (BEL)	Lotto–Vlaanderen–Jong–Mbk–Merckx	+ 48"
5	Marc Madiot (FRA)	Toshiba	+ 55"
6	Ronan Pensec (FRA)	Z–Peugeot	+ 1' 03"
7	Miguel Induráin (ESP)	Reynolds	+ 1' 28"
8	Claudio Chiappucci (ITA)	Carrera Jeans–Vagabond	+ 1' 32"
9	Jacques Decrion (FRA)	Super U–Raleigh–Fiat	+ 1' 35"
10	Luc Roosen (BEL)	Histor–Sigma	+ 1' 56"
