= 1981 Tour de Suisse =

Race details
- Dates: 10–19 June 1981
- Stages: 9 + Prologue
- Distance: 1,628 km (1,012 mi)
- Winning time: 42h 40' 41"

Results
	Winner	Beat Breu (SUI)	(Cilo–Aufina)
	Second	Josef Fuchs (SUI)	(Cilo–Aufina)
	Third	Leonardo Natale (ITA)	(Magniflex–Olmo)
	Points	Pierino Gavazzi (ITA)	(Magniflex–Olmo)
	Mountains	Beat Breu (SUI)	(Cilo–Aufina)
	Combination	Pierino Gavazzi (ITA)	(Magniflex–Olmo)
	Team	Cilo–Aufina	

The 1981 Tour de Suisse was the 45th edition of the Tour de Suisse cycle race and was held from 10 June to 19 June 1981. The race started in Wohlen and finished in Zürich. The race was won by Beat Breu of the Cilo–Aufina team.

== General classification ==
Final general classification

Rank	Rider	Team	Time
1	Beat Breu (SUI)	Cilo–Aufina	42h 40' 41"
2	Joseph Fuchs (SUI)	Cilo–Aufina	+ 32"
3	Leonardo Natale (ITA)	Magniflex–Olmo	+ 1' 04"
4	Gottfried Schmutz (SUI)	Cilo–Aufina	+ 2' 09"
5	Henk Lubberding (NED)	TI–Raleigh–Creda	+ 4' 10"
6	Ueli Sutter (SUI)	Cilo–Aufina	+ 4' 57"
7	Dietrich Thurau (FRG)	Kondor	+ 5' 27"
8	Albert Zweifel (SUI)	Sem–France Loire–Campagnolo	+ 5' 56"
9	Guy Nulens (BEL)	DAF Trucks–Côte d'Or	+ 7' 46"
10	Eddy Schepers (BEL)	DAF Trucks–Côte d'Or	+ 8' 48"
