= 1987 Ronde van Nederland =

Dutch cycling race

These are the results for the 27th edition of the Ronde van Nederland cycling race, which was held from August 17 to August 22, 1987. The race started in Bergen op Zoom (North Brabant) and finished in Gulpen (Limburg).

== Final classification ==
RANK	NAME CYCLIST	TEAM	TIME
1.	Teun van Vliet (NED)	Panasonic–Isostar	22:22:45
2.	Marc Sergeant (BEL)	Lotto–Merckx	+ 0.26
3.	Adri van der Poel (NED)	PDM–Ultima–Concorde	+ 0.35
4.	Mathieu Hermans (NED)	Seat–Orbea–Danena	+ 0.44
5.	Edwig Van Hooydonck (BEL)	Superconfex–Kwantum–Yoko–Colnago	+ 0.54
6.	Guy Nulens (BEL)	Panasonic–Isostar	+ 1.05
7.	Gert-Jan Theunisse (NED)	PDM–Ultima–Concorde	+ 1.13
8.	Gert Jakobs (NED)	Superconfex–Kwantum–Yoko–Colnago	+ 4.17
9.	Christophe Lavainne (FRA)	Système U	+ 4.22
10.	Peter Harings (NED)	Panasonic–Isostar	+ 6.45
