= 1988 Volta a Catalunya =

Race details
- Dates: 2–7 September 1988
- Stages: 6
- Distance: 989.4 km (614.8 mi)
- Winning time: 25h 29' 14"

Results
	Winner	Miguel Induráin (ESP)	(Reynolds)
	Second	Laudelino Cubino (ESP)	(BH)
	Third	Marino Lejarreta (ESP)	(Caja Rural–Orbea)
	Points	Alfonso Gutiérrez (ESP)	(Teka)
	Mountains	Arsenio González (ESP)	(Teka)
	Sprints	Louis de Koning (NED)	(Panasonic–Isostar–Colnago–Agu)
	Team	Reynolds	

The 1988 Volta a Catalunya was the 68th edition of the Volta a Catalunya cycle race and was held from 2 September to 7 September 1988. The race started in Salou and finished in Lleida. The race was won by Miguel Induráin of the Reynolds team.

== General classification ==
Final general classification

Rank	Rider	Team	Time
1	Miguel Induráin (ESP)	Reynolds	25h 29' 14"
2	Laudelino Cubino (ESP)	BH	+ 8"
3	Marino Lejarreta (ESP)	Caja Rural–Orbea	+ 44"
4	Álvaro Pino (ESP)	BH	+ 51"
5	Pello Ruiz Cabestany (ESP)	Chateau d'Ax	+ 2' 18"
6	Eric Van Lancker (BEL)	Panasonic–Isostar–Colnago–Agu	+ 2' 48"
7	Enrique Aja (ESP)	Teka	+ 2' 51"
8	Robert Millar (GBR)	Fagor–MBK	+ 3' 10"
9	Luca Rota (ITA)	Del Tongo	+ 3' 18"
10	Edgar Corredor (COL)	Café de Colombia	+ 3' 29"
