= 1987 Tour of the Basque Country =

Race details
- Dates: 6–10 April 1987
- Stages: 5
- Distance: 852.7 km (529.8 mi)
- Winning time: 22h 16' 31"

Results
	Winner	Sean Kelly (IRL)	(Kas)
	Second	Rolf Gölz (FRG)	(Superconfex–Kwantum–Yoko–Colnago)
	Third	Julián Gorospe (ESP)	(Reynolds)

The 1987 Tour of the Basque Country was the 27th edition of the Tour of the Basque Country cycle race and was held from 6 April to 10 April 1987. The race started in Zarautz and finished in Arantzazu. The race was won by Sean Kelly of the Kas team.

== General classification ==
Final general classification

Rank	Rider	Team	Time
1	Sean Kelly (IRL)	Kas	22h 16' 31"
2	Rolf Gölz (FRG)	Superconfex–Kwantum–Yoko–Colnago	+ 1' 13"
3	Julián Gorospe (ESP)	Reynolds	+ 1' 17"
4	Jesús Blanco Villar (ESP)	Teka	+ 1' 40"
5	Martin Earley (IRL)	Fagor–MBK	+ 1' 41"
6	José Luis Laguía (ESP)	PDM–Ultima–Concorde	+ 1' 54"
7	Acácio da Silva (POR)	Kas	+ 1' 57"
8	Ángel Arroyo (ESP)	Reynolds	+ 2' 04"
9	Gianbattista Baronchelli (ITA)	Del Tongo	+ 2' 07"
10	Marino Lejarreta (ESP)	Caja Rural–Orbea	+ 2' 18"
