= 1985 Tour de Suisse =

Race details
- Dates: 11–20 June 1985
- Stages: 9 + Prologue
- Distance: 1,571 km (976.2 mi)
- Winning time: 40h 47' 43"

Results
	Winner	Phil Anderson (AUS)	(Panasonic–Raleigh)
	Second	Niki Rüttimann (SUI)	(La Vie Claire)
	Third	Guido Winterberg (SUI)	(La Vie Claire)
	Points	Phil Anderson (AUS)	(Panasonic–Raleigh)
	Mountains	Phil Anderson (AUS)	(Panasonic–Raleigh)
	Team	La Vie Claire	

The 1985 Tour de Suisse was the 49th edition of the Tour de Suisse cycle race and was held from 11 June to 20 June 1985. The race started in Locarno and finished in Zürich. The race was won by Phil Anderson of the Panasonic team.

== General classification ==
Final general classification

Rank	Rider	Team	Time
1	Phil Anderson (AUS)	Panasonic–Raleigh	40h 47' 43"
2	Niki Rüttimann (SUI)	La Vie Claire	+ 42"
3	Guido Winterberg (SUI)	La Vie Claire	+ 1' 00"
4	Sean Kelly (IRL)	Skil–Sem–Kas–Miko	+ 1' 19"
5	Beat Breu (SUI)	Carrera–Inoxpran	+ 1' 30"
6	Hubert Seiz (SUI)	Cilo–Aufina–Magniflex	+ 2' 13"
7	Peter Winnen (NED)	Panasonic–Raleigh	+ 2' 26"
8	Acácio da Silva (POR)	Malvor–Bottecchia–Vaporella	+ 2' 53"
9	Marco Vitali (ITA)	Del Tongo–Colnago	+ 2' 56"
10	Jörg Muller (SUI)	Skil–Sem–Kas–Miko	+ 3' 30"
