= 1990 Paris–Nice =

Race details
- Dates: 4–11 March 1990
- Stages: 7 + Prologue
- Distance: 1,116.4 km (693.7 mi)
- Winning time: 29h 27' 30"

Results
Jersey awarded to the overall winner	Winner	Miguel Induráin (ESP)	(Banesto)
	Second	Stephen Roche (IRL)	(Histor–Sigma)
	Third	Luc Leblanc (FRA)	(Castorama)

The 1990 Paris–Nice was the 48th edition of the Paris–Nice cycle race and was held from 4 March to 11 March 1990. The race started in Paris and finished at the Col d'Èze. The race was won by Miguel Induráin of the Banesto team.

== Route ==
Stage characteristics and winners
Stage	Date	Course	Distance	Type	Winner
P	4 March	Paris	7 km (4.3 mi)	Individual time trial	Francis Moreau (FRA)
1	5 March	Orléans to Nevers	184 km (114 mi)		Etienne De Wilde (BEL)
2	6 March	Nevers to Lyon	245 km (152 mi)		Carlo Bomans (BEL)
3	7 March	Saint-Étienne	44.5 km (27.7 mi)	Team time trial	Histor–Sigma
4	8 March	Vergèze to Marseille	179 km (111 mi)		Adriano Baffi (ITA)
5	9 March	Marseille to Toulon/Mont Faron	164 km (102 mi)		Miguel Induráin (ESP)
6	10 March	Toulon to Mandelieu-la-Napoule	178 km (111 mi)		Claudio Chiappucci (ITA)
7a	11 March	Mandelieu-la-Napoule to Nice	102 km (63 mi)		Mauro Ribeiro (BRA)
7b	11 March	Nice to Col d'Èze	12 km (7.5 mi)	Individual time trial	Jean-François Bernard (FRA)

== General classification ==
Final general classification

Rank	Rider	Team	Time
1	Miguel Induráin (ESP)	Banesto	29h 27' 30"
2	Stephen Roche (IRL)	Histor–Sigma	+ 8"
3	Luc Leblanc (FRA)	Castorama	+ 42"
4	Laurent Fignon (FRA)	Castorama	+ 52"
5	Éric Boyer (FRA)	Z–Tomasso	+ 1' 19"
6	Pascal Simon (FRA)	Castorama	+ 1' 33"
7	Claudio Chiappucci (ITA)	Carrera Jeans–Vagabond	+ 1' 41"
8	Moreno Argentin (ITA)	Ariostea	+ 2' 14"
9	Atle Kvålsvoll (NOR)	Z–Tomasso	+ 2' 29"
10	Alex Pedersen (DEN)	ONCE	+ 2' 33"
