= 1991 Volta a Catalunya =

Race details
- Dates: 6–12 September 1991
- Stages: 7
- Distance: 877.1 km (545.0 mi)
- Winning time: 21h 35' 56"

Results
	Winner	Miguel Induráin (ESP)	(Banesto)
	Second	Pedro Delgado (ESP)	(Banesto)
	Third	Alex Zülle (SUI)	(ONCE)
	Points	Maurizio Fondriest (ITA)	(Panasonic–Sportlife)
	Mountains	Lucho Herrera (COL)	(Postobón–Manzana–Ryalcao)
	Sprints	Miguel Ángel Iglesias (ESP)	(Puertas Mavisa)
	Team	Banesto	

The 1991 Volta a Catalunya was the 71st edition of the Volta a Catalunya cycle race and was held from 6 September to 12 September 1991. The race started in Manresa and finished in Tortosa. The race was won by Miguel Induráin of the Banesto team.

== General classification ==
Final general classification

Rank	Rider	Team	Time
1	Miguel Induráin (ESP)	Banesto	21h 35' 56"
2	Pedro Delgado (ESP)	Banesto	+ 1' 00"
3	Alex Zülle (SUI)	ONCE	+ 1' 28"
4	Álvaro Mejía (COL)	Postobón–Manzana–Ryalcao	+ 1' 32"
5	Piotr Ugrumov (URS)	Seur–Otero	+ 1' 36"
6	Stephen Hodge (AUS)	ONCE	+ 1' 42"
7	Federico Echave (ESP)	CLAS–Cajastur	+ 1' 52"
8	Oliverio Rincón (COL)	Kelme–Ibexpress	+ 2' 20"
9	Andrew Hampsten (USA)	Motorola	+ 2' 21"
10	Javier Murguialday (ESP)	Amaya Seguros	+ 2' 25"
