= 1989 Tour de Romandie =

Race details
- Dates: 9–14 May 1989
- Stages: 5 + Prologue
- Distance: 859.4 km (534.0 mi)
- Winning time: 21h 37' 06"

Results
	Winner	Phil Anderson (AUS)	(TVM–Ragno)
	Second	Gilles Delion (FRA)	(Helvetia–La Suisse)
	Third	Robert Millar (GBR)	(Z–Peugeot)

The 1989 Tour de Romandie was the 43rd edition of the Tour de Romandie cycle race and was held from 9 May to 14 May 1989. The race started in Plan-les-Ouates and finished in Geneva. The race was won by Phil Anderson of the TVM team.

== General classification ==
Final general classification
Rank	Rider	Team	Time
1	Phil Anderson (AUS)	TVM–Ragno	21h 37' 06"
2	Gilles Delion (FRA)	Helvetia–La Suisse	+ 1' 04"
3	Robert Millar (GBR)	Z–Peugeot	+ 1' 06"
4	Laurent Fignon (FRA)	Super U–Raleigh–Fiat	+ 1' 20"
5	Urs Zimmermann (SUI)	Carrera Jeans–Vagabond	+ 1' 41"
6	Tony Rominger (SUI)	Chateau d'Ax	+ 1' 50"
7	Gianni Bugno (ITA)	Chateau d'Ax	+ 2' 27"
8	Michael Wilson (AUS)	Helvetia–La Suisse	+ 2' 39"
9	Erik Breukink (NED)	Panasonic–Isostar–Colnago–Agu	+ 2' 49"
10	Denis Roux (FRA)	Toshiba	+ 2' 49"
