= 1987 Tour de Romandie =

Race details
- Dates: 5–10 May 1987
- Stages: 5 + Prologue
- Distance: 804.3 km (499.8 mi)
- Winning time: 21h 56' 58"

Results
	Winner	Stephen Roche (IRL)	(Carrera Jeans–Vagabond)
	Second	Jean-Claude Leclercq (FRA)	(Toshiba–Look)
	Third	Ronan Pensec (FRA)	(Vétements Z–Peugeot)

The 1987 Tour de Romandie was the 41st edition of the Tour de Romandie cycle race and was held from 5 May to 10 May 1987. The race started in Bernex and finished in Chandolin. The race was won by Stephen Roche of the Carrera team.

== General classification ==
Final general classification
Rank	Rider	Team	Time
1	Stephen Roche (IRL)	Carrera Jeans–Vagabond	21h 56' 58"
2	Jean-Claude Leclercq (FRA)	Toshiba–Look	+ 1' 15"
3	Ronan Pensec (FRA)	Vétements Z–Peugeot	+ 1' 23"
4	Robert Millar (GBR)	Panasonic–Isostar	+ 2' 04"
5	Jérôme Simon (FRA)	Vétements Z–Peugeot	+ 2' 44"
6	Beat Breu (SUI)	Isotonic–Cyndarella	+ 2' 57"
7	Bruno Cornillet (FRA)	Vétements Z–Peugeot	+ 3' 05"
8	Peter Winnen (NED)	Panasonic–Isostar	+ 3' 14"
9	Dag Erik Pedersen (NOR)	Ariostea–Gres	+ 3' 16"
10	Rolf Järmann (SUI)	Isotonic–Cyndarella	+ 3' 21"
