= 1985 Tirreno–Adriatico =

Race details
- Dates: 7–13 March 1985
- Stages: 6 + Prologue
- Distance: 1,010.4 km (627.8 mi)
- Winning time: 28h 21' 08"

Results
	Winner	Joop Zoetemelk (NED)	(Kwantum–Decosol–Yoko)
	Second	Acácio da Silva (POR)	(Malvor–Bottecchia–Vaporella)
	Third	Stefan Mutter (SUI)	(Carrera–Inoxpran)

The 1985 Tirreno–Adriatico was the 20th edition of the Tirreno–Adriatico cycle race and was held from 7 March to 13 March 1985. The race started in Santa Marinella and finished in San Benedetto del Tronto. The race was won by Joop Zoetemelk of the Kwantum team.

== General classification ==
Final general classification

Rank	Rider	Team	Time
1	Joop Zoetemelk (NED)	Kwantum–Decosol–Yoko	28h 21' 08"
2	Acácio da Silva (POR)	Malvor–Bottecchia–Vaporella	+ 57"
3	Stefan Mutter (SUI)	Carrera–Inoxpran	+ 1' 20"
4	Gianbattista Baronchelli (ITA)	Supermercati Brianzoli	+ 1' 26"
5	José Luis Navarro (ESP)	Zor–Gemeaz Cusin	+ 1' 28"
6	Iñaki Gastón (ESP)	Reynolds	+ 1' 33"
7	Silvano Contini (ITA)	Ariostea–Oece	+ 1' 37"
8	Johan Lammerts (NED)	Panasonic–Raleigh	+ 1' 43"
9	Niki Rüttimann (SUI)	La Vie Claire	+ 1' 46"
10	Theo de Rooij (NED)	Panasonic–Raleigh	+ 1' 53"
