= 1984 E3 Prijs Vlaanderen =

1984 E3 Harelbeke
Race details
- Dates: 24 March 1984
- Stages: 1
- Distance: 225 km (140 mi)
- Winning time: 5h 13' 00"

Results
	Winner	Bert Oosterbosch (NED)	(Panasonic–Raleigh)
	Second	Eddy Planckaert (BEL)	(Panasonic–Raleigh)
	Third	Leo van Vliet (NED)	(Kwantum–Decosol–Yoko)

The 1984 E3 Harelbeke was the 27th edition of the E3 Harelbeke cycle race and was held on 24 March 1984. The race started and finished in Harelbeke. The race was won by Bert Oosterbosch of the Panasonic team.

== General classification ==
Final general classification

Rank	Rider	Team	Time
1	Bert Oosterbosch (NED)	Panasonic–Raleigh	5h 13' 00"
2	Eddy Planckaert (BEL)	Panasonic–Raleigh	+ 2' 04"
3	Leo van Vliet (NED)	Kwantum–Decosol–Yoko	+ 2' 06"
4	Eric Vanderaerden (BEL)	Panasonic–Raleigh	+ 2' 54"
5	Yvan Lamote (BEL)	Splendor–Mondial Moquettes–Marc	+ 2' 54"
6	William Tackaert (BEL)	Fangio–Tönissteiner	+ 2' 54"
7	Ludo Peeters (BEL)	Kwantum–Decosol–Yoko	+ 2' 54"
8	Luc Colijn (BEL)	Safir–Van de Ven	+ 2' 54"
9	Walter Planckaert (BEL)	Panasonic–Raleigh	+ 2' 54"
10	Patrick Versluys (BEL)	Splendor–Mondial Moquettes–Marc	+ 2' 54"
