= 1986 Tour de Romandie =

Race details
- Dates: 5–11 May 1986
- Stages: 6 + Prologue
- Distance: 1,083.4 km (673.2 mi)
- Winning time: 28h 34' 29"

Results
	Winner	Claude Criquielion (BEL)	(Hitachi–Marc)
	Second	Jean-François Bernard (FRA)	(La Vie Claire)
	Third	Bruno Cornillet (FRA)	(Peugeot–Shell)

The 1986 Tour de Romandie was the 40th edition of the Tour de Romandie cycle race and was held from 5 May to 11 May 1986. The race started in Lugano and finished in Geneva. The race was won by Claude Criquielion of the Hitachi team.

== General classification ==
Final general classification
Rank	Rider	Team	Time
1	Claude Criquielion (BEL)	Hitachi–Marc	28h 34' 29"
2	Jean-François Bernard (FRA)	La Vie Claire	+ 2' 35"
3	Bruno Cornillet (FRA)	Peugeot–Shell	+ 2' 38"
4	Nico Emonds (BEL)	Kwantum–Decosol–Yoko	+ 3' 13"
5	Jean-Marie Grezet (SUI)	Cilo–Aufina–Gemeaz Cusin	+ 3' 27"
6	Bernard Vallet (FRA)	RMO–Cycles Méral–Mavic	+ 4' 18"
7	Jörg Muller (SUI)	Kas	+ 4' 27"
8	Urs Zimmermann (SUI)	Carrera Jeans–Vagabond	+ 4' 58"
9	Beat Breu (SUI)	Carrera Jeans–Vagabond	+ 4' 59"
10	Marc Sergeant (BEL)	Lotto–Emerxil–Merckx	+ 5' 03"
