= 1985 Tour de Romandie =

Race details
- Dates: 7–12 May 1985
- Stages: 5 + Prologue
- Distance: 760.3 km (472.4 mi)
- Winning time: 22h 25' 23"

Results
	Winner	Jörg Muller (SUI)	(Skil–Sem–Kas–Miko)
	Second	Acácio da Silva (POR)	(Malvor–Bottecchia–Vaporella)
	Third	Tommy Prim (SWE)	(Sammontana–Bianchi)

The 1985 Tour de Romandie was the 39th edition of the Tour de Romandie cycle race and was held from 7 May to 12 May 1985. The race started in Monthey and finished in Geneva. The race was won by Jörg Muller of the Skil team.

== General classification ==
Final general classification
Rank	Rider	Team	Time
1	Jörg Muller (SUI)	Skil–Sem–Kas–Miko	22h 25' 23"
2	Acácio da Silva (POR)	Malvor–Bottecchia–Vaporella	+ 1' 32"
3	Tommy Prim (SWE)	Sammontana–Bianchi	+ 2' 56"
4	Joop Zoetemelk (NED)	Kwantum–Decosol–Yoko	+ 3' 06"
5	Niki Rüttimann (SUI)	La Vie Claire	+ 3' 27"
6	Jean-Marie Grezet (SUI)	Cilo–Aufina–Magniflex	+ 3' 35"
7	Johan van der Velde (NED)	Vini Ricordi–Pinarello–Sidermec	+ 3' 37"
8	Beat Breu (SUI)	Carrera–Inoxpran	+ 3' 59"
9	Marino Lejarreta (ESP)	Alpilatte–Olmo–Cierre	+ 4' 00"
10	Hubert Seiz (SUI)	Cilo–Aufina–Magniflex	+ 4' 08"
