= 1988 Tour de Romandie =

Race details
- Dates: 10–15 May 1988
- Stages: 5 + Prologue
- Distance: 896.4 km (557.0 mi)
- Winning time: 22h 48' 01"

Results
| | Winner | Gerard Veldscholten (NED) | (Weinmann–La Suisse–SMM Uster) |
| | Second | Tony Rominger (SUI) | (Chateau d'Ax) |
| | Third | Urs Zimmermann (SUI) | (Carrera Jeans–Vagabond) |

The 1988 Tour de Romandie was the 42nd edition of the Tour de Romandie cycle race and was held from 10 May to 15 May 1988. The race started in La Chaux-de-Fonds and finished in Geneva. The race was won by Gerard Veldscholten of the Weinmann team.

== General classification ==
Final general classification
| Rank | Rider | Team | Time |
|---|---|---|---|
| 1 | Gerard Veldscholten (NED) | Weinmann–La Suisse–SMM Uster | 22h 48' 01" |
| 2 | Tony Rominger (SUI) | Chateau d'Ax | + 8" |
| 3 | Urs Zimmermann (SUI) | Carrera Jeans–Vagabond | + 22" |
| 4 | Andrew Hampsten (USA) | 7-Eleven–Hoonved | + 33" |
| 5 | Jean-François Bernard (FRA) | Toshiba–Look | + 39" |
| 6 | Pedro Delgado (ESP) | Reynolds | + 1' 29" |
| 7 | Beat Breu (SUI) | Cyndarella–Isotonic | + 1' 33" |
| 8 | Marco Giovannetti (ITA) | GIS–Ecoflam–Jolly | + 1' 38" |
| 9 | Marc Madiot (FRA) | Toshiba–Look | + 1' 47" |
| 10 | Omar Hernández (COL) | Reynolds | + 1' 49" |
