= Teun van Vliet =

Dutch cyclist (born 1962)

Personal information
- Full name: Teun van Vliet
- Born: 22 March 1962 (age 64) Vlaardingen, the Netherlands

Cycling career
- Sport: Cycling
- Discipline: Road
- Role: Rider

Professional teams
- 1984–1985: Dries-Verandalux
- 1986–1990: Panasonic

Major wins
- Ronde van Nederland (1987); Gent–Wevelgem (1987); Omloop Het Volk (1987)

Teun van Vliet (born 22 March 1962 in Vlaardingen, South Holland) is a retired road bicycle racer from the Netherlands, who was a professional rider from 1984 to 1990. Van Vliet's best year was 1987, when he won Gent–Wevelgem, Omloop "Het Volk" and the Ronde van Nederland. The next year he wore the yellow jersey for three days in the 1988 Tour de France.

Van Vliet is the brother of the 1977 Dutch woman road champion Nita van Vliet and uncle of racing cyclist Kim de Baat. He is however not related to Leo van Vliet, another famous Dutch road cyclist in the late 1970s, early 1980s.

== Major results ==
1979
World champion Track points race for juniors
1980
Netherlands track points race amateur championship
1984
Circuit des Mines
1985
Hansweert
1986
Aalsmeer
Grand Prix d'Isbergues
Groot-Ammers
Liedekerkse Pijl
1987
Bavel
Ronde van Nederland
Omloop Het Volk
Gent–Wevelgem
Profronde van Wateringen
Sas van Gent
1988
Tiel
Tour de France:

Wearing yellow jersey for three days

Ulvenhout

== See also ==
- List of Dutch cyclists who have led the Tour de France general classification
