= 1985 Volta a Catalunya =

Race details
- Dates: 4–11 September 1985
- Stages: 7 + Prologue
- Distance: 1,283.4 km (797.5 mi)
- Winning time: 34h 00' 18"

Results
	Winner	Robert Millar (GBR)	(Peugeot–Shell–Michelin)
	Second	Sean Kelly (IRL)	(Skil–Sem–Kas–Miko)
	Third	Julián Gorospe (ESP)	(Reynolds)
	Points	Sean Kelly (IRL)	(Skil–Sem–Kas–Miko)
	Mountains	Celestino Prieto (ESP)	(Reynolds)
	Sprints	Jokin Mújika (ESP)	(Seat–Orbea)
	Team	Reynolds	

The 1985 Volta a Catalunya was the 65th edition of the Volta a Catalunya cycle race and was held from 4 September to 11 September 1985. The race started in Llançà and finished in Salou. The race was won by Robert Millar of the Peugeot team.

== General classification ==
Final general classification

Rank	Rider	Team	Time
1	Robert Millar (GBR)	Peugeot–Shell–Michelin	34h 00' 18"
2	Sean Kelly (IRL)	Skil–Sem–Kas–Miko	+ 3"
3	Julián Gorospe (ESP)	Reynolds	+ 35"
4	Vicente Belda (ESP)	Kelme–Merckx	+ 36"
5	Pacho Rodríguez (COL)	Zor–Gemeaz Cusin	+ 1' 42"
6	Robert Forest (FRA)	Peugeot–Shell–Michelin	+ 2' 06"
7	Álvaro Pino (ESP)	Zor–Gemeaz Cusin	+ 2' 38"
8	Celestino Prieto (ESP)	Reynolds	+ 2' 47"
9	Pedro Delgado (ESP)	Orbea–Gin MG	+ 3' 17"
10	Federico Echave (ESP)	Teka	+ 3' 53"
