= 1991 Tour of the Basque Country =

Race details
- Dates: 8–12 April 1991
- Stages: 5
- Distance: 792 km (492.1 mi)
- Winning time: 19h 56' 09"

Results
	Winner	Claudio Chiappucci (ITA)	(Carrera Jeans–Tassoni)
	Second	Johan Bruyneel (BEL)	(Lotto)
	Third	Piotr Ugrumov (LAT)	(Seur–Otero)

The 1991 Tour of the Basque Country was the 31st edition of the Tour of the Basque Country cycle race and was held from 8 April to 12 April 1991. The race started in Andoain and finished in Elgeta. The race was won by Claudio Chiappucci of the Carrera team.

== General classification ==
Final general classification

Rank	Rider	Team	Time
1	Claudio Chiappucci (ITA)	Carrera Jeans–Tassoni	19h 56' 09"
2	Johan Bruyneel (BEL)	Lotto	+ 2' 17"
3	Piotr Ugrumov (LAT)	Seur–Otero	+ 2' 39"
4	José Luis Laguía (ESP)	Artiach–Royal	+ 2' 39"
5	Marino Lejarreta (ESP)	ONCE	+ 2' 55"
6	Ivan Ivanov (URS)	Seur–Otero	+ 3' 00"
7	Stephen Roche (IRL)	Tonton Tapis–GB	+ 3' 18"
8	Víctor Gonzalo Guirao (ESP)	CLAS–Cajastur	+ 3' 24"
9	Patrice Esnault (FRA)	Amaya Seguros	+ 3' 27"
10	Julián Gorospe (ESP)	Banesto	+ 3' 30"
