= Rolf Gölz =

German cyclist (born 1962)

Personal information
- Full name: Rolf Gölz
- Born: 30 September 1962 (age 64) Bad Schussenried, West Germany

Cycling career
- Sport: Cycling
- Current team: Retired
- Discipline: Road
- Role: Rider

Professional teams
- 1985–1986: Del Tongo–Colnago
- 1987–1990: Superconfex–Kwantum–Yoko–Colnago
- 1991–1992: Ariostea
- 1993: Marin

Major wins
- Grand Tours Tour de France 2 individual stages (1987, 1988) One-day races National Road Race Championship (1985) La Flèche Wallonne (1988) Züri-Metzgete (1987) Milano–Torino (1988, 1989) Trofeo Baracchi (1990) Paris–Brussels (1988)
Medal record
Men's track cycling
Representing West Germany
Olympic Games
Silver medal – second place	1984 Los Angeles	Individual pursuit
Bronze medal – third place	1984 Los Angeles	Team pursuit

Rolf Gölz (born 30 September 1962) is a retired road and track cyclist from Germany, who was a professional rider from 1985 to 1993. He won the German National Road Race in 1985 and narrowly missed the podium in the 1987 UCI World Championship finishing in 4th place.

He represented West Germany at the 1984 Summer Olympics in Los Angeles, California, where he won the silver medal in the men's individual pursuit, behind America's Steve Hegg. At the same Olympic Games, Gölz also claimed the bronze medal in the 4,000 m team pursuit. Other victories included the 1988 editions of Paris–Brussels and the Nissan Classic.

== Major results ==
1983
Nacht von Hannover
1983
World Amateur Track Team Pursuit Championship
1985
Germany National Road Race Championship
Vuelta a Andalucía
Firenze–Pistoia
1986
Aachen
Fellbach
Stuttgart
Giro di Campania
1987
Hamburg
Hengelo
Munster
Reutlingen
Vuelta a Andalucía
Tour du Haut-Var
Züri-Metzgete
Tour de France:

Winner stage 15

1988
Goppingen
Tour of Ireland
Walsrode
Vuelta a Asturias
La Flèche Wallonne
Tour de France:

Winner stage 8

Paris–Brussels
Milano–Torino
Giro del Piemonte
1989
Milano–Torino
1990
Trofeo Baracchi (with Tom Cordes)
1992
Hegiberg-Rundfahrt
Tour Méditerranéen
