= Alfons De Wolf =

Belgian cyclist (born 1956)

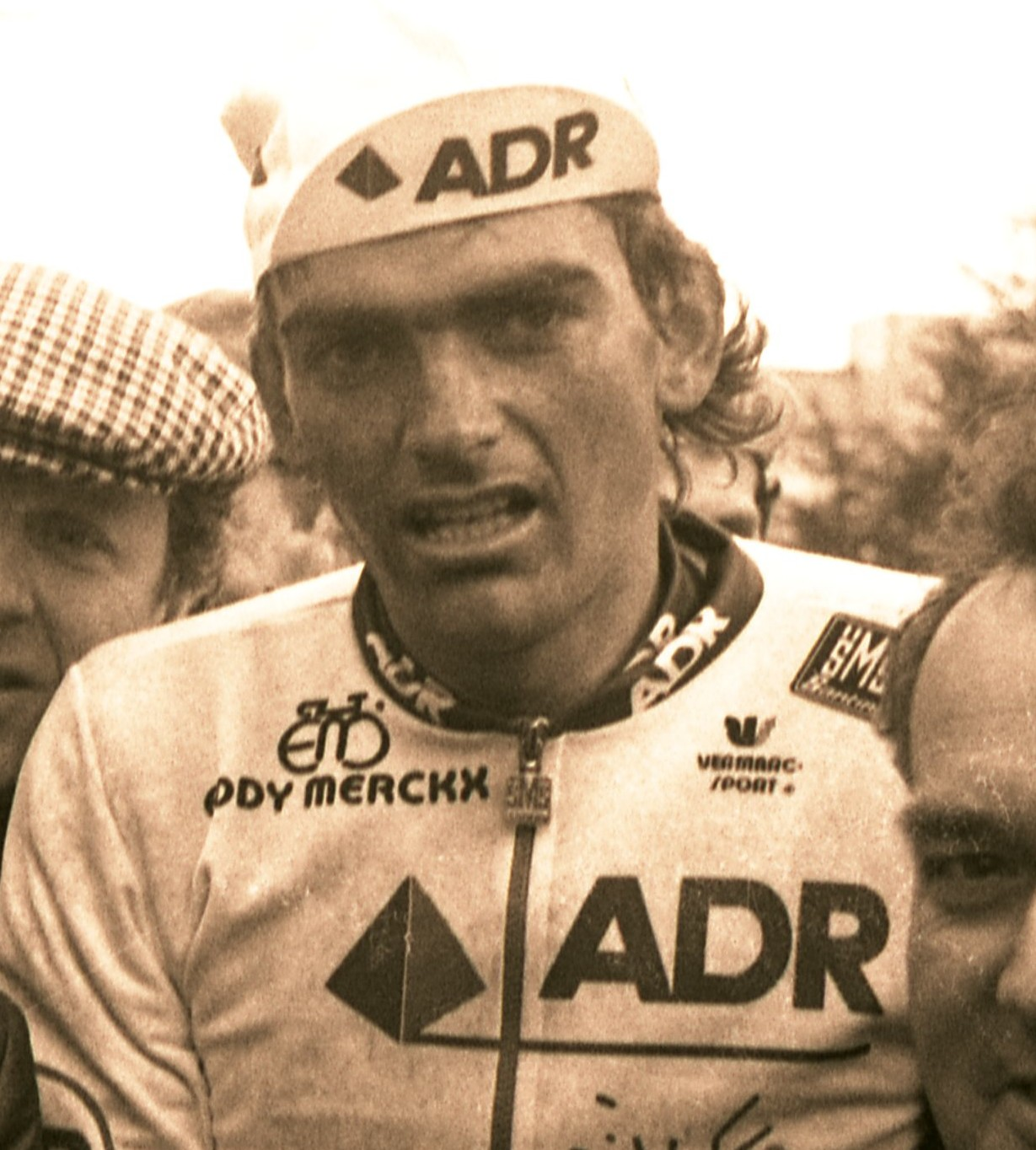
- De Wolf after the 1988 Dwars door België (collection: KOERS. Museum of Cycle Racing)

Personal information
- Born: 22 June 1956 (age 70) Willebroek, Belgium

Cycling career
- Sport: Cycling
- Discipline: Road
- Role: Rider
- Rider type: Classics specialist

Amateur team
- 1978: IJsboerke–Warncke Eis (stagiaire)

Professional teams
- 1979–1980: Lano–Boule d'Or
- 1981–1982: Vermeer Thijs
- 1983: Bianchi–Piaggio
- 1984: Europ Decor–Boule d'Or
- 1985: Fagor
- 1986: Skala–Skil
- 1987–1989: AD Renting–Fangio–IOC–MBK
- 1990: IOC–Tulip Computers

Major wins
- Grand Tours Tour de France 1 individual stage (1984) Vuelta a España Points classification (1979) 6 individual stages (1979, 1985) One-day races and Classics Giro di Lombardia (1980) Milan–San Remo (1981) Omloop Het Volk (1982, 1983)

Alfons "Fons" De Wolf (born 22 June 1956) is a retired Belgian road race cyclist, a professional from 1979 to 1990. He represented his country at the 1976 Summer Olympics in Montreal, Canada.

He was forecast, with Daniel Willems, to be the successor to Eddy Merckx. De Wolf seemed to fulfill that promise by having an absolutely dominant 1979 Vuelta a España winning 5 stages including an individual time trial as well as the Points Classification, securing a top 10 place in the General Classification and then following it up by winning the 1980 Giro di Lombardia and the 1981 Milan–San Remo, the last and first classic of the season. He almost won the 1982 Liège–Bastogne–Liège, but he finally lost it to the Italian Silvano Contini in the final sprint due to a shifting error.

After winning a stage in the 1984 Tour de France, his career faded, however the stage win he claimed was an impressive individual effort in which he was able to beat the group of favorites including Bernard Hinault and eventual winner Laurent Fignon by a stunning margin of almost eighteen minutes. He helped his teammate Eddy Planckaert win the green jersey in the 1988 Tour de France. He ended his career in 1990.

He now helps his wife in her funeral parlour in Dworp, in the south of Brussels.

Although he won the Omloop Het Volk two times, De Wolf was an atypical Flemish cyclist, preferring Italian races such as Milan–San Remo to Paris–Roubaix, Gent–Wevelgem and the Tour of Flanders. He was at ease in hilly races, though he was not an impressive climber. He complained that he was seen as a 'new Eddy Merckx', that the public had expected too much.

== Major results ==
1976
1st Overall Tour de Namur
3rd Ronde van Vlaanderen Beloften
4th Road race, Olympic Games
1977
1st Kattekoers
3rd Ronde van Vlaanderen Beloften
4th Seraing–Aachen–Seraing
5th Road race, UCI Amateur Road World Championships
9th Circuit du Hainaut
1978
1st Road race, National Amateur Road Championships
1st Paris–Roubaix Espoirs
2nd Overall Grand Prix Guillaume Tell

1st Stages 2 & 5

2nd Circuit du Hainaut
2nd Flèche Ardennaise
2nd Kattekoers
1979
2nd Trofeo Baracchi (with Jan van Houwelingen)
3rd Overall Tour of Belgium
3rd Scheldeprijs
4th Overall Three Days of Bruges–De Panne
4th Herinneringsprijs Dokter Tistaert – Prijs Groot-Zottegem
5th Road race, National Road Championships
5th La Flèche Wallonne
6th Gran Premio di Lugano
7th Omloop Het Volk
7th Brabantse Pijl
8th Liège–Bastogne–Liège
9th Overall Vuelta a España

1st Points classification
1st Stages 2, 7, 9, 16b (ITT) & 19

9th Overall Tirreno–Adriatico
9th Paris–Roubaix
1980
1st Giro di Lombardia
1st Druivenkoers Overijse
1st Trofeo Baracchi (with Jean-Luc Vandenbroucke)
1st Stage 3 Three Days of Bruges–De Panne
2nd Overall Tirreno–Adriatico
2nd Amstel Gold Race
2nd Gent–Wevelgem
2nd Circuit des Frontières
3rd Overall Vuelta a Mallorca
3rd Coppa Bernocchi
3rd Rund um den Henninger Turm
4th Liège–Bastogne–Liège
4th Paris–Tours
4th Grand Prix de Fourmies
5th Overall Giro di Sardegna
6th Paris–Roubaix
6th Züri-Metzgete
6th Grand Prix des Nations
7th Overall Tour of Belgium

1st Stage 4a

7th Omloop Het Volk
7th Omloop van de Vlaamse Scheldeboorden
8th Paris–Brussels
10th Tour of Flanders
10th Milan–San Remo
1981
1st Milan–San Remo
1st Circuit des Frontières
1st Stage 6 Tour de Suisse
1st Stage 4 Tour of Belgium
2nd Grand Prix Eddy Merckx
3rd Overall Paris–Nice
3rd Gent–Wevelgem
3rd Amstel Gold Race
3rd E3 Prijs Vlaanderen
4th Road race, National Road Championships
4th Giro del Piemonte
5th Overall Deutschland Tour
5th Züri-Metzgete
6th Brabantse Pijl
7th Road race, UCI World Championships
7th Tour of Flanders
7th Paris–Brussels
9th Grand Prix des Nations
10th Paris–Roubaix
1982
1st Omloop Het Volk
1st Cagliari-Sassari
1st Stage 1a Three Days of Bruges–De Panne
2nd Liège–Bastogne–Liège
2nd Grote Prijs Jef Scherens
3rd Road race, National Road Championships
3rd Gent–Wevelgem
3rd Paris–Tours
3rd Ronde van Limburg
4th Giro del Piemonte
4th Rund um den Henninger Turm
8th Overall Four Days of Dunkirk

1st Stage 5a

10th La Flèche Wallonne
1983
1st Omloop Het Volk
1st Coppa Agostoni
1st Giro della Romagna
1st Giro di Toscana
1st Stage 2 Giro del Trentino
1st Stage 1 Setmana Catalana de Ciclisme
2nd Milano–Vignola
3rd Brabantse Pijl
5th Overall Giro di Sardegna
6th Coppa Placci
8th Liège–Bastogne–Liège
9th La Flèche Wallonne
1984
1st Stage 14 Tour de France
1st Stage 1 Tour de Romandie
1st Stage 3 Vuelta a Andalucía
1st Stage 6 Tour of Norway
8th Druivenkoers Overijse
9th Grand Prix Eddy Merckx
1985
1st Stage 9 Vuelta a España
1st Stage 2 Volta a la Comunitat Valenciana
4th Overall Étoile des Espoirs
1986
6th Tour of Flanders
9th Grand Prix de Wallonie
10th De Brabantse Pijl
1988
2nd Dwars door België
7th Gent–Wevelgem
1989
3rd Road race, National Road Championships
1990
7th Nokere Koerse

=== Grand Tour general classification results timeline ===
Grand Tour	1979	1980	1981	1982	1983	1984	1985	1986	1987	1988	1989
Giro d'Italia	—	—	—	—	49	—	—	38	—	—	70
Tour de France	—	—	11	31	—	74	DNF	—	—	102	—
Vuelta a España	9	—	—	—	—	—	81	—	—	—	—

==== Monuments results timeline ====
Monuments results timeline
Monument	1979	1980	1981	1982	1983	1984	1985	1986	1987	1988	1989
Milan–San Remo	—	10	1	15	—	—	12	42	82	77	—
Tour of Flanders	30	10	7	18	19	—	—	6	46	36	—
Paris–Roubaix	9	6	10	13	—	19	—	—	—	27	—
Liège–Bastogne–Liège	8	4	—	2	8	—	37	—	42	15	—
Giro di Lombardia	—	1	—	13	—	—	—	—	—	—	—

Legend
—	Did not compete
DNF	Did not finish
