= Omloop van de Westhoek =

Cycling competition

Race details
- Date: March
- Region: West Flanders
- Discipline: Road
- Type: One-day race
- Web site: www.ddwvl.be/elite_vrouwen.php

History
- First edition: 1955 (men); 2018 (women)
- Editions: Men: 55; Women: 2
- Final edition: 2017 (men); 2021 (women)
- First winner: Gabriel Borra (BEL)
- Most wins: Nico Kuypers (BEL) (3 wins)
- Final winner: Joren Touquet (BEL)

History (women)
- First winner: Floortje Mackaij (NED)
- Most wins: No repeat winners
- Most recent: Christine Majerus (LUX)

The Omloop van de Westhoek is a one-day road cycling race held annually near Ichtegem, West Flanders, Belgium since 1955. After the death of cyclist Stive Vermaut in 2004, the official name of the race was changed to Omloop van de Westhoek-Memorial Stive Vermaut. A women's edition was held in 2018 as a UCI category 1.2 event and in 2021 as a 1.1 rated event. The men's race has not been held since 2017, and the women's has not been held since 2021.

== Winners ==
=== Men ===
Year	Winner	Second	Third
1955	(Belgium) Gabriel Borra	(Belgium) Marcel Ongenae	(Belgium) Werner Vanhaecke
1956	(Belgium) Roger Beke	(Belgium) Willy Desmet	(Belgium) Roger Soenens
1957	(Belgium) Marcel Seynaeve	(Belgium) Hector Sabbe	(Belgium) Roger Beke
1958	(Belgium) Albert Daenekynt	(Belgium) Georges Van Maeckelberghe	(Belgium) F. Rousseau
1959–1960	No race		
1961	(Belgium) Rom. De Gruyter	(Belgium) Yvan Covent	(Belgium) Léon Vergauwen
1962	(Belgium) Georges Vandenberghe		
1963	(Belgium) Bernard Maertens	(Belgium) Willy Vanheste	(Belgium) Étienne Van Vlierberghe
1964	(Belgium) Guido Reybrouck	(Belgium) Étienne Mattheus	(Belgium) Camiel Vyncke
1965	(Belgium) Hubert Criel	(Belgium) Donaat Himpe	(Belgium) Rémi Van Vreckom
1966	(Netherlands) Wim Dubois	(Belgium) Herman Decan	(Belgium) Robert Legein
1967	(Belgium) Jos Van Mechelen	(Belgium) Robert Legein	(Belgium) Gilbert Verlinde
1968	(Netherlands) Cees Rentmeester	(Belgium) Pol Mahieu	(Belgium) Eddy Museeuw
1969	(Belgium) Roland Callewaert	(Belgium) Daniel Verplancke	(Belgium) M. Desmedt
1970	No race		
1971	(Belgium) Gilbert Eeckhout	(France) Gérard Olbe	(Belgium) Eddy Ronquetti
1972	(Belgium) Freddy Maertens	(Belgium) Michel Pollentier	(Netherlands) Fons van Katwijk
1973	(Netherlands) Bas Hordijk	(Belgium) Mich. Dragin	(Belgium) Lieven Malfait
1974	No race		
1975	(Belgium) Jean-Luc Vandenbroucke	(Netherlands) Gaby Minneboo	(Belgium) Ronny Bossant
1976	(Belgium) Eddy Vanhaerens	(Netherlands) Toine van den Bunder	(Belgium) Wilfried Vyncke
1977	(Netherlands) Toine van den Bunder	(Belgium) Frank Hoste	(Belgium) Bernard Huyghe
1978	(Belgium) Walter Schoonjans	(Belgium) Dirk Vermeersch	(Belgium) Freddy Tanghe
1979	(Belgium) Johan Denijs	(Belgium) Werner Devos	(Belgium) Bernard Huyghe
1980	(Belgium) Alain Van Hoornweder	(Belgium) Eric Borra	(Belgium) Christian Vannieuwenhuyse
1981	(Belgium) Johan Denijs	(Belgium) Hedwig Maes	(Belgium) Patrick Vanvyaene
1982	(Belgium) Eric Wuytack	(Belgium) Chris Capelle	(Belgium) Pieter Verhaeghe
1983	(Belgium) Patrick Verplancke	(Belgium) Gino Knockaert	(Belgium) Rudy Van Gheluwe
1984	(Netherlands) Roger Lemmens	(Belgium) Peter Spaenhoven	(Belgium) Marc Versluys
1985	(Belgium) Jan Mattheus	(Belgium) Rudy De Keyzer	(Netherlands) Jos Roovers
1986	(Belgium) Johan Museeuw	(Belgium) Peter Huyghe	(Belgium) Patrick Verplancke
No race
1988	(Belgium) Jan Mattheus	(Belgium) Reginald Vandamme	(Belgium) Walter De Veerman
1989	(Belgium) Reginald Vandamme	(Belgium) Geert De Buck	(Belgium) Stefaan Vermeersch
1990	(Netherlands) Danny Nelissen	(Belgium) Willy Willems	(Belgium) Eric De Clercq
1991	(Belgium) Danny Daelman	(Belgium) Tom Steels	(Netherlands) Niels Boogaard
1992	(Canada) Sean Way	(Belgium) Danny Daelman	(Belgium) Danny Sleeckx
1993	(Belgium) Didier Priem	(Belgium) Stefaan Vermeersch	(Netherlands) Roger Vaessen
1994	(Denmark) Frank Høj	(Belgium) Stefaan Vermeersch	(Belgium) Patrick Van Daele
1995	(Belgium) Danny Jonckheere	(Belgium) Yoeri Wandels	(Belgium) Pascal Lievens
1996	(Belgium) Jurgen Vermeersch	(Belgium) Jan Mattheus	(Belgium) Danny Jonckheere
1997	(Belgium) Pascal Lievens	(Belgium) Jan Mattheus	(Belgium) Jurgen Vermeersch
1998	(Belgium) Kurt Dewulf	(Belgium) Nico Strynckx	(Belgium) Sébastien Van den Abeele
1999	(Belgium) Mario Raes	(Belgium) Pascal Lievens	(Belgium) James Vanlandschoot
2000	(Belgium) Jurgen De Buysschere	(Belgium) Patrick Cocquyt	(Belgium) Steven De Champs
2001	(Belgium) Patrick Cocquyt	(Belgium) Igor Abakoumov	(Belgium) Lars Vantournhout
2002	(Belgium) Tim Lenaers	(Belgium) Patrick Cocquyt	(Belgium) Jurgen Deceuninck
2003	(Belgium) Nico Kuypers	(Belgium) Steven De Schamp	(Belgium) Jurgen Vermeersch
2004	(Belgium) Nico Kuypers	(Belgium) Jurgen Van Loocke	(Belgium) Mario Willems
2005	(Belgium) Nico Kuypers	(Belgium) Jarno Van Mingeroet	(Belgium) Gerdy Ververken
2006	(Belgium) Steven Vanden Bussche	(Belgium) Dirk Clarysse	(Belgium) Geert Vermoote
2007	(Belgium) Gerdy Ververken	(Belgium) Jonas Reybrouck	(Belgium) Nico Savat
2008	No race		
2009	(Belgium) Joeri Clauwaert	(Belgium) Werner Vandromme	(Belgium) Stijn Minne
2010	(Belgium) Sven Jodts	(Belgium) Kevin Maene	(Belgium) Martijn Debaene
2011	(Belgium) Nielsen Raedt	(Belgium) Dries Depoorter	(Belgium) Thomas Ongena
2012	(Belgium) Jens Wallays	(Netherlands) Brian van Goethem	(Belgium) Jo Maes
2013	(Belgium) Jens Wallays	(Belgium) Jo Maes	(Belgium) Nielsen Raedt
2014	(Belgium) Joeri Calleeuw	(Belgium) Michael Cools	(Belgium) Steven Caethoven
2015	(Belgium) Stijn Minne	(Belgium) Jan Logier	(Belgium) Gianni Marchand
2016	(Belgium) Jo Maes	(Belgium) Stijn Minne	(Belgium) Arjen Livyns
2017	(Belgium) Joren Touquet	(Belgium) Jens Vandenbogaerde	(Belgium) Johan Hemroulle

=== Women ===
Year	Winner	Second	Third
2018	(Netherlands) Floortje Mackaij	(Netherlands) Lorena Wiebes	(Netherlands) Marjolein Van't Geloof
2019	Cancelled due to high winds		
2020	Cancelled due to the Covid-19 pandemic		
2021	(Luxembourg) Christine Majerus	(Netherlands) Amy Pieters	(Netherlands) Thalita de Jong
