= 1972 Dwars door België =

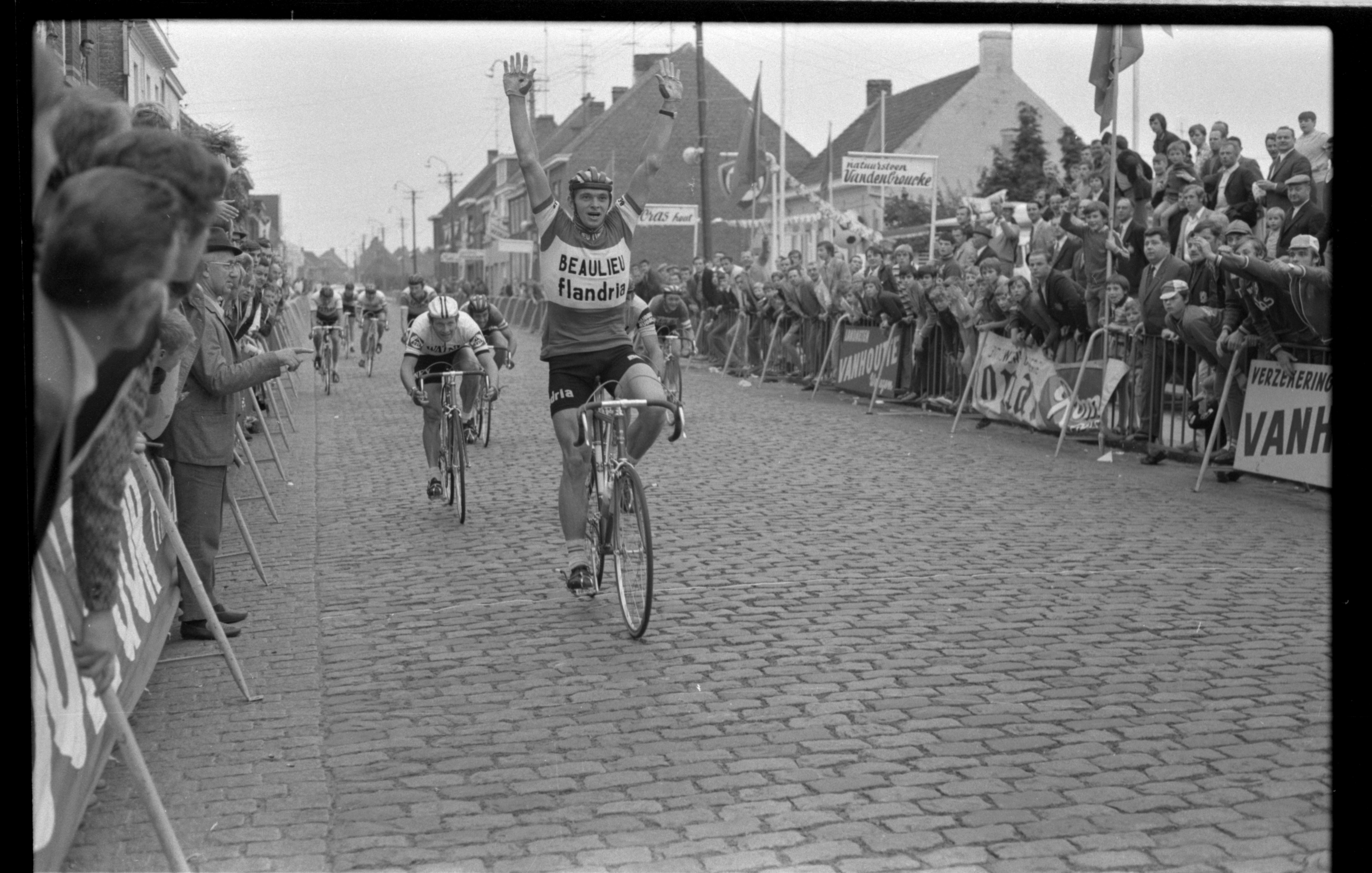
- Marc Demeyer winning 1972 Dwars door België in Waregem (collection KOERS. Museum of Cycling)

Race details
- Dates: 27 August 1972
- Stages: 1
- Distance: 193 km (119.9 mi)
- Winning time: 4h 52' 00"

Results
	Winner	Marc Demeyer (BEL)
	Second	Noël Vantyghem (BEL)
	Third	Eddy Verstraeten (BEL)

The 1972 Dwars door België was the 27th edition of the Dwars door Vlaanderen cycle race and was held on 27 August 1972. The race started and finished in Waregem. The race was won by Marc Demeyer.

== General classification ==
Final general classification

Rank	Rider	Time
1	Marc Demeyer (BEL)	4h 52' 00"
2	Noël Vantyghem (BEL)	+ 0"
3	Eddy Verstraeten (BEL)	+ 0"
4	Daniel Verplancke (BEL)	+ 0"
5	Ronny Christiaens (BEL)	+ 0"
6	Willy Van Neste (BEL)	+ 0"
7	Romain Maes (BEL)	+ 0"
8	Ronny Van de Vijver (BEL)	+ 0"
9	Paul Aerts (BEL)	+ 0"
10	Marcel Maes (BEL)	+ 0"
