= Jean-Luc Vandenbroucke =

Belgian cyclist

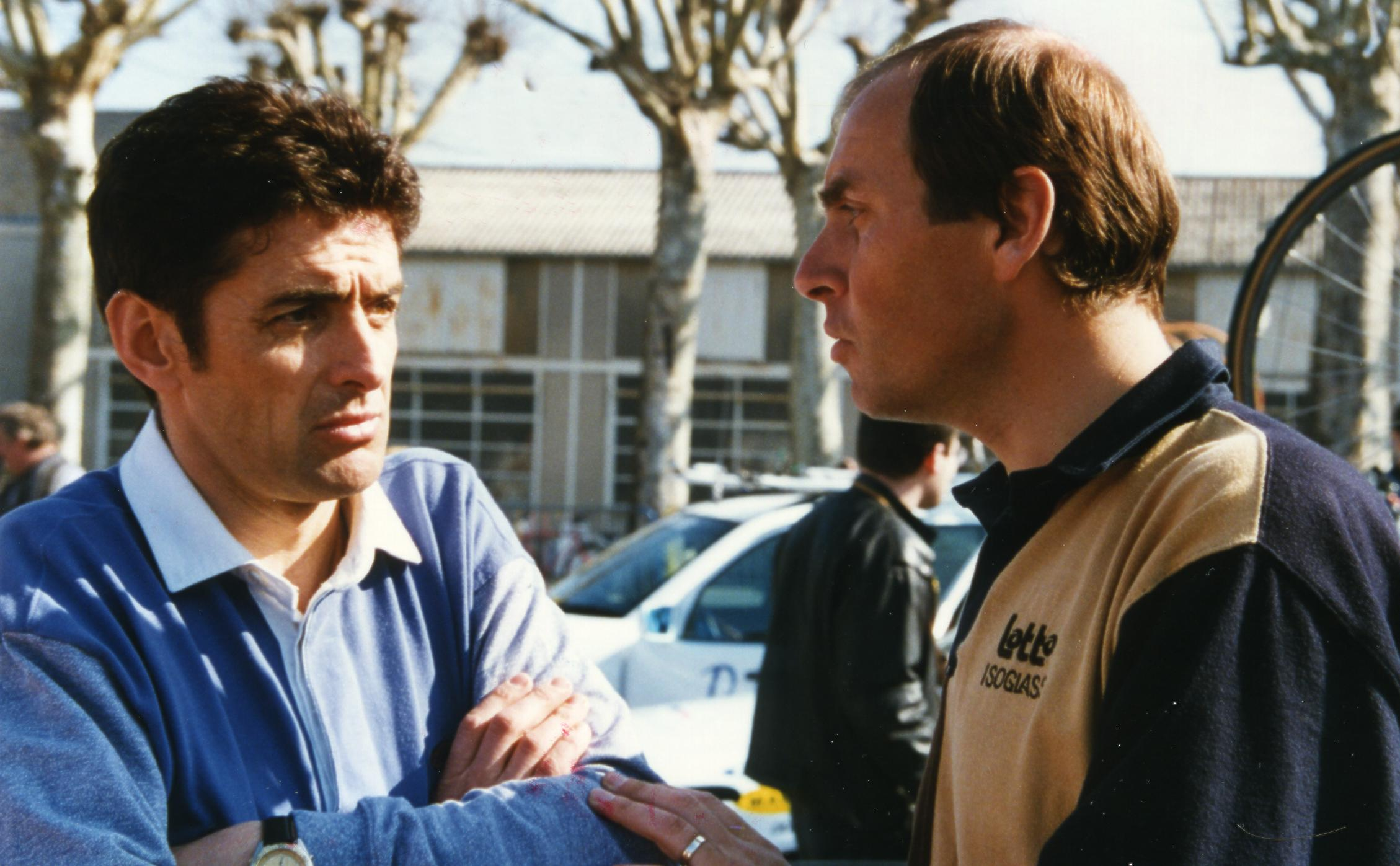
- Marc Madiot and Vandenbroucke (right) at the 1997 Paris–Nice

Personal information
- Full name: Jean-Luc Vandenbroucke
- Born: 31 May 1955 (age 71) Mouscron, Belgium

Cycling career
- Sport: Cycling
- Current team: Retired
- Disciplines: Road; Track
- Role: Rider
- Rider type: Time trialist

Professional teams
- 1975–1979: Peugeot–BP–Michelin
- 1980–1985: La Redoute–Motobécane
- 1986–1987: Kas–Kaskol
- 1988: Hitachi–Bosal–B.C.E. Snooker

Managerial team
- 1988–1999: Lotto

Major wins
- Grand Tours Vuelta a España 1 individual stage (1987) Stage races Four Days of Dunkirk (1980, 1985) Three Days of Bruges–De Panne (1985) One-day races and Classics Paris–Tours (1982)
Medal record
Representing Belgium
Men's track cycling
World Championships
Bronze medal – third place	1978 Munich	Individual pursuit
Bronze medal – third place	1984 Barcelona	Individual pursuit

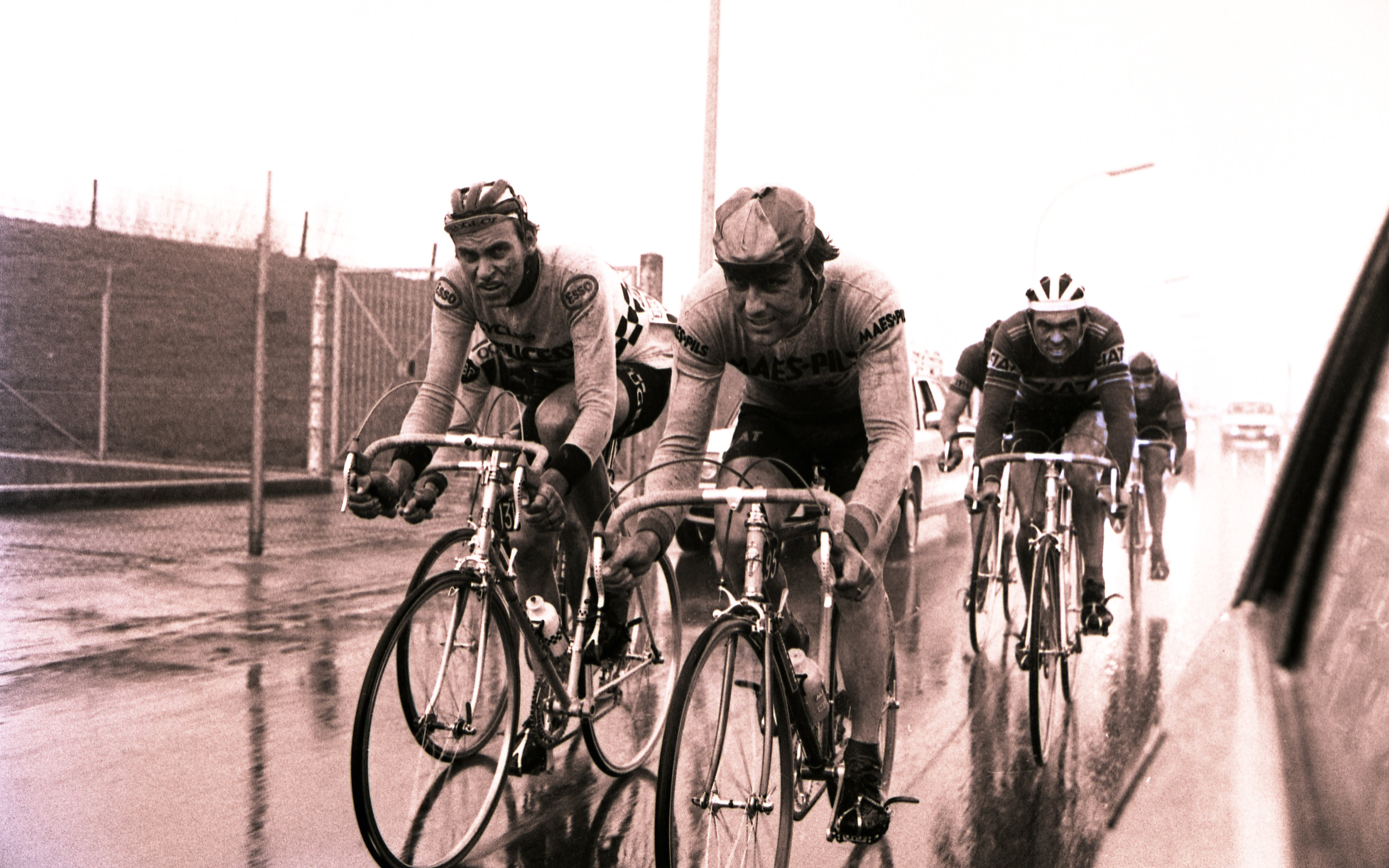
Walter Planckaert, Jean-Luc Vandenbrouck and Patrick Sercu during Dwars door België 1977 (collection KOERS. Museum of Cycle Racing)

Jean-Luc Vandenbroucke (born 31 May 1955) is a Belgian former road bicycle racer, track cyclist and directeur sportif. He is an uncle of Frank Vandenbroucke. He was a prologue specialist, winning 19 prologues throughout his career.

== Cycling career ==
He won the one-day classic Blois-Chaville (a reconfigured version of Paris–Tours) in 1982. However, certain victory in the race was snatched from Laurent Fignon, who broke a pedal crank while in the lead near the finish.

== Major results ==
1975
1st Flèche Ardennaise
1st Omloop van de Westhoek
5th Omloop van het Houtland
9th Circuit des Frontières
9th Grand Prix des Nations
1976
1st Overall Étoile des Espoirs

1st Stage 3b (ITT)

1st Grand Prix de Fourmies
1st Omloop van het Zuidwesten
2nd Road race, National Road Championships
~~3rd Milan–San Remo~~
5th Paris–Tours
7th Tour du Condroz
8th Grand Prix des Nations
9th Overall Tour de l'Aude
1977
1st Overall Étoile des Espoirs
1st Grand Prix de Fourmies
1st Prologue Critérium du Dauphiné Libéré
2nd Giro di Lombardia
3rd Overall Paris–Nice
3rd Overall Four Days of Dunkirk
4th Dwars door België
4th Omloop Het Volk
4th Grand Prix des Nations
5th Overall Tour de l'Aude
5th Tour du Haut Var
5th Grand Prix de Wallonie
6th Overall Ronde van Nederland
6th Giro dell'Emilia
7th Road race, National Road Championships
7th Grand Prix d'Isbergues
9th Paris–Brussels
10th Milan–San Remo
1978
1st Circuit des Frontières
1st Stage 6 Paris–Nice
1st Stage 2b Tour de l'Aude
1st Prologue Tour de Corse
3rd Overall Tour Méditerranéen
3rd Overall Tour d'Indre-et-Loire

1st Stage 2a

3rd Tour du Haut Var
3rd Paris–Brussels
4th Overall Four Days of Dunkirk
5th Tour of Flanders
6th Grand Prix de Monaco
7th Grand Prix des Nations
1979
1st Grand Prix de Fourmies
Étoile des Espoirs

1st Prologue & Stage 2

2nd Omloop van het Zuidwesten
3rd Overall Four Days of Dunkirk
3rd Kuurne–Brussels–Kuurne
4th Overall Tour Méditerranéen
4th Giro di Lombardia
5th Paris–Tours
7th Rund um den Henninger Turm
7th Paris–Brussels
9th Dwars door België
1980
1st Overall Four Days of Dunkirk

1st Stage 4b (ITT)

1st Overall Tour d'Indre-et-Loire

1st Stage 2a (ITT)

1st Grand Prix des Nations
1st Trofeo Baracchi (with Alfons De Wolf)
6th Tour du Haut Var
7th Giro di Lombardia
8th Overall Paris–Nice

1st Stage 6

8th Overall Étoile des Espoirs

1st Stage 5

8th Omloop Het Volk
1981
1st Overall Tour de l'Oise

1st Stage 2b

1st Stage 1 Four Days of Dunkirk
2nd Kuurne–Brussels–Kuurne
3rd Omloop Het Volk
3rd Tour du Haut Var
5th Tour of Flanders
7th Overall Tour de l'Aude

1st Prologue

9th Overall Paris–Nice

1st Stage 7a

1982
1st Overall Étoile des Espoirs

1st Stage 5b (ITT)

1st Paris–Tours
1st Prologue Tour de l'Aude
2nd Overall Tour de l'Oise

1st Prologue

2nd Dwars door België
3rd Overall Paris–Nice
3rd Overall Three Days of De Panne
3rd Grand Prix Eddy Merckx
4th Giro di Lombardia
5th Overall Tour Méditerranéen
5th Overall Four Days of Dunkirk

1st Prologue

1983
1st Grand Prix Eddy Merckx
1st Stage 3 Grand Prix du Midi Libre
1st Stage 3 Tour Méditerranéen
Étoile des Espoirs

1st Prologue & Stage 6 (ITT)

2nd Grand Prix d'Isbergues
4th Overall Four Days of Dunkirk
4th Overall Tour de l'Aude

1st Prologue

4th Grand Prix des Nations
7th Road race, UCI Road World Championships
1984
1st Prologue Tour de l'Aude
2nd Overall Four Days of Dunkirk
2nd Omloop Het Volk
2nd Critérium des As
2nd Grand Prix Eddy Merckx
3rd Overall Étoile de Bessèges
3rd Tour of Flanders
5th Overall Tour of Belgium

1st Prologue & Stage 4a (ITT)

5th Grand Prix d'Isbergues
6th Paris–Roubaix
6th Grand Prix des Nations
7th Overall Three Days of Bruges–De Panne
7th Overall Tour Méditerranéen
8th Trofeo Baracchi
9th Paris–Tours
10th GP du canton d'Argovie
1985
1st Overall Three Days of Bruges–De Panne
1st Overall Four Days of Dunkirk

1st Prologue

1st Prologue Grand Prix du Midi Libre
1st Prologue Tour de l'Aude
3rd Grand Prix des Nations
5th Paris–Tours
8th Nice–Alassio
9th Paris–Brussels
10th Grand Prix Eddy Merckx
1986
1st Overall Tour de l'Aude
3rd Overall Three Days of Bruges–De Panne
5th Overall Tour de l'Oise
5th Grand Prix Cerami
1987
Vuelta a España

1st Prologue
Held & after Prologue

1st Prologue Paris–Nice
1st Stage 7 (ITT) Vuelta a Andalucía
1st Prologue Grand Prix du Midi Libre
3rd Overall Three Days of Bruges–De Panne
7th Circuit des Frontières
8th Overall Tour de l'Oise
9th Overall Tour d'Armorique
10th Le Samyn
1988
1st Stage 4 Tour Méditerranéen
