= 1988 Dwars door België =

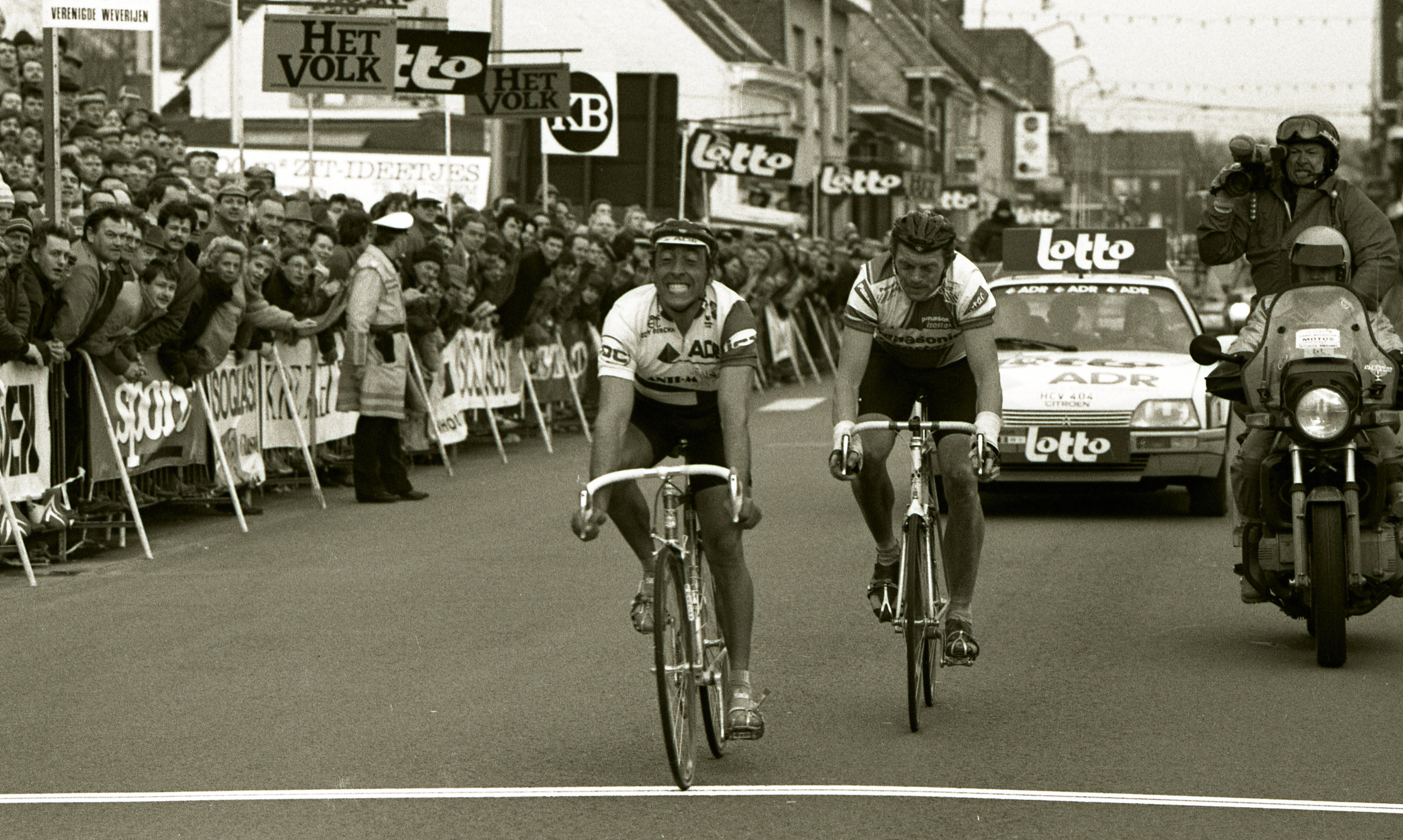
- Eddy Planckaert arriving in 1988 Dwars door België in Waregem (Collection KOERS. Museum van de Wielersport)

Race details
- Dates: 24 March 1988
- Stages: 1
- Distance: 230 km (142.9 mi)
- Winning time: 6h 10' 00"

Results
	Winner	John Talen (NED)
	Second	Alfons De Wolf (BEL)
	Third	Nico Verhoeven (NED)

The 1988 Dwars door België was the 43rd edition of the Dwars door Vlaanderen cycle race and was held on 24 March 1988. The race started and finished in Waregem. The race was initially won by Eddy Planckaert. However, in September 1988, he had to relinquish this victory to secondly placed John Talen, because of a positive test of the prohibited substance codeine, though the team doctor claimed that Planckaert on the day of the race took two "antigrippines" in good faith.

== General classification ==
Final general classification

Rank	Rider	Time
1	John Talen (NED)	6h 10' 00"
2	Alfons De Wolf (BEL)	+ 7"
3	Nico Verhoeven (NED)	+ 30"
~~4~~	~~Eddy Planckaert (BEL)~~	~~+ 30"~~
5	Martin Schalkers (NED)	+ 30"
6	Patrick Cocquyt (BEL)	+ 30"
7	Marc Sergeant (BEL)	+ 1' 15"
8	Wim Van Eynde (BEL)	+ 1' 15"
9	Patrick Verschueren (BEL)	+ 1' 45"
10	Wim Arras (BEL)	+ 1' 45"
