= Koers =

Koers can refer to:

- Belgian Dutch for racing

- KOERS Museum, museum in Roeselare, Belgium

- Marko Koers (born 1972), Dutch middle-distance runner
