= 1977 Dwars door België =

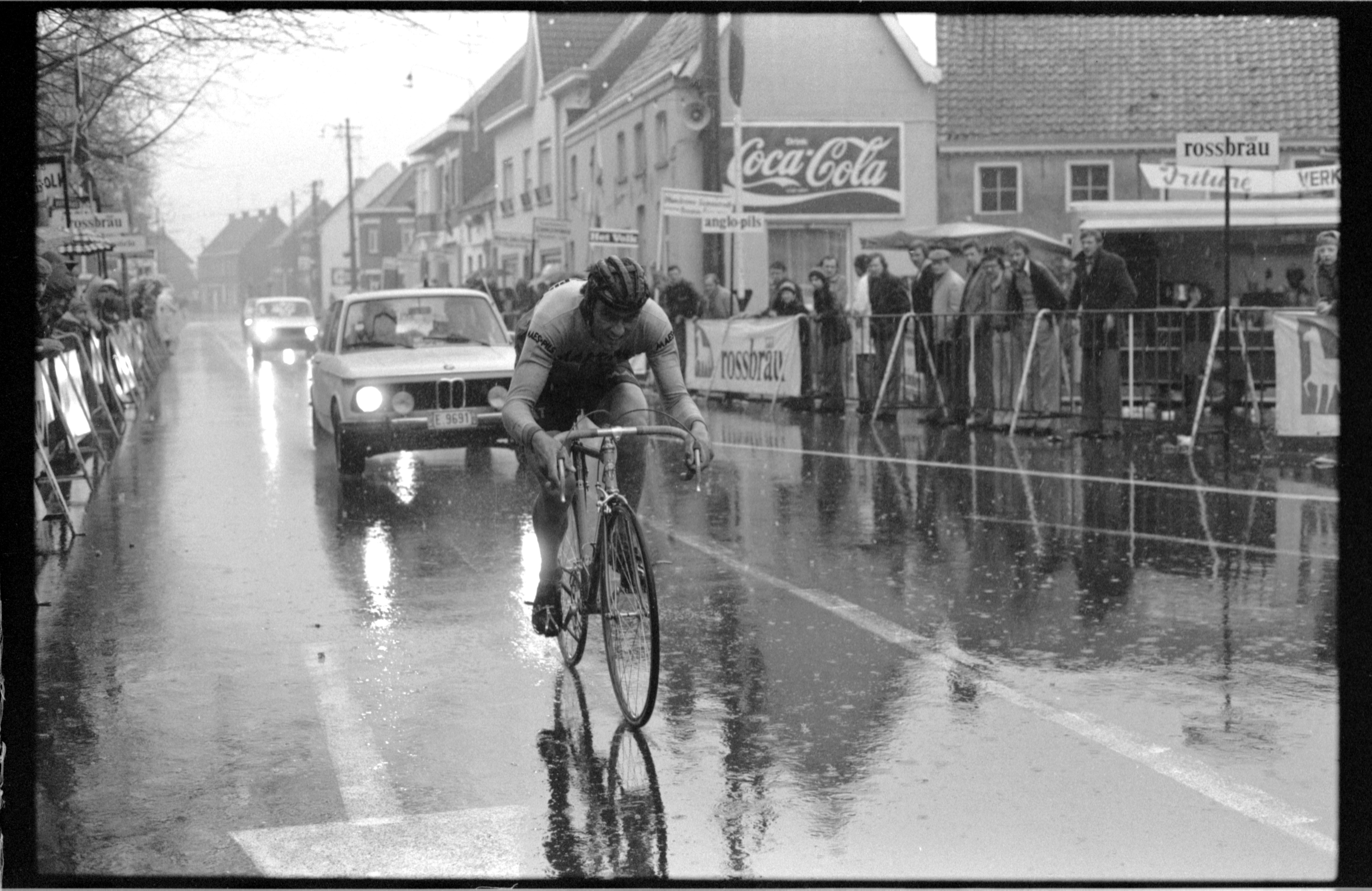
- Walter Planckaert arriving solo in Waregem (collectie KOERS. Museum van de Wielersport)

Race details
- Dates: 27 March 1977
- Stages: 1
- Distance: 205 km (127.4 mi)
- Winning time: 5h 03' 00"

Results
	Winner	Walter Planckaert (BEL)
	Second	Eric Leman (BEL)
	Third	Marc Demeyer (BEL)

The 1977 Dwars door België was the 32nd edition of the Dwars door Vlaanderen cycle race and was held on 27 March 1977. The race started and finished in Waregem. The race was won by Walter Planckaert.

== General classification ==
Final general classification

Rank	Rider	Time
1	Walter Planckaert (BEL)	5h 03' 00"
2	Eric Leman (BEL)	+ 1' 35"
3	Marc Demeyer (BEL)	+ 1' 35"
4	Jean-Luc Vandenbroucke (BEL)	+ 2' 15"
5	Gustaaf Van Roosbroeck (BEL)	+ 2' 25"
6	Patrick Sercu (BEL)	+ 2' 30"
7	Rudy Pevenage (BEL)	+ 2' 45"
8	Frans Verhaegen (BEL)	+ 2' 45"
9	Daniel Verplancke (BEL)	+ 2' 45"
10	Patrick Lefevere (BEL)	+ 2' 45"
