= 1981 Dwars door België =

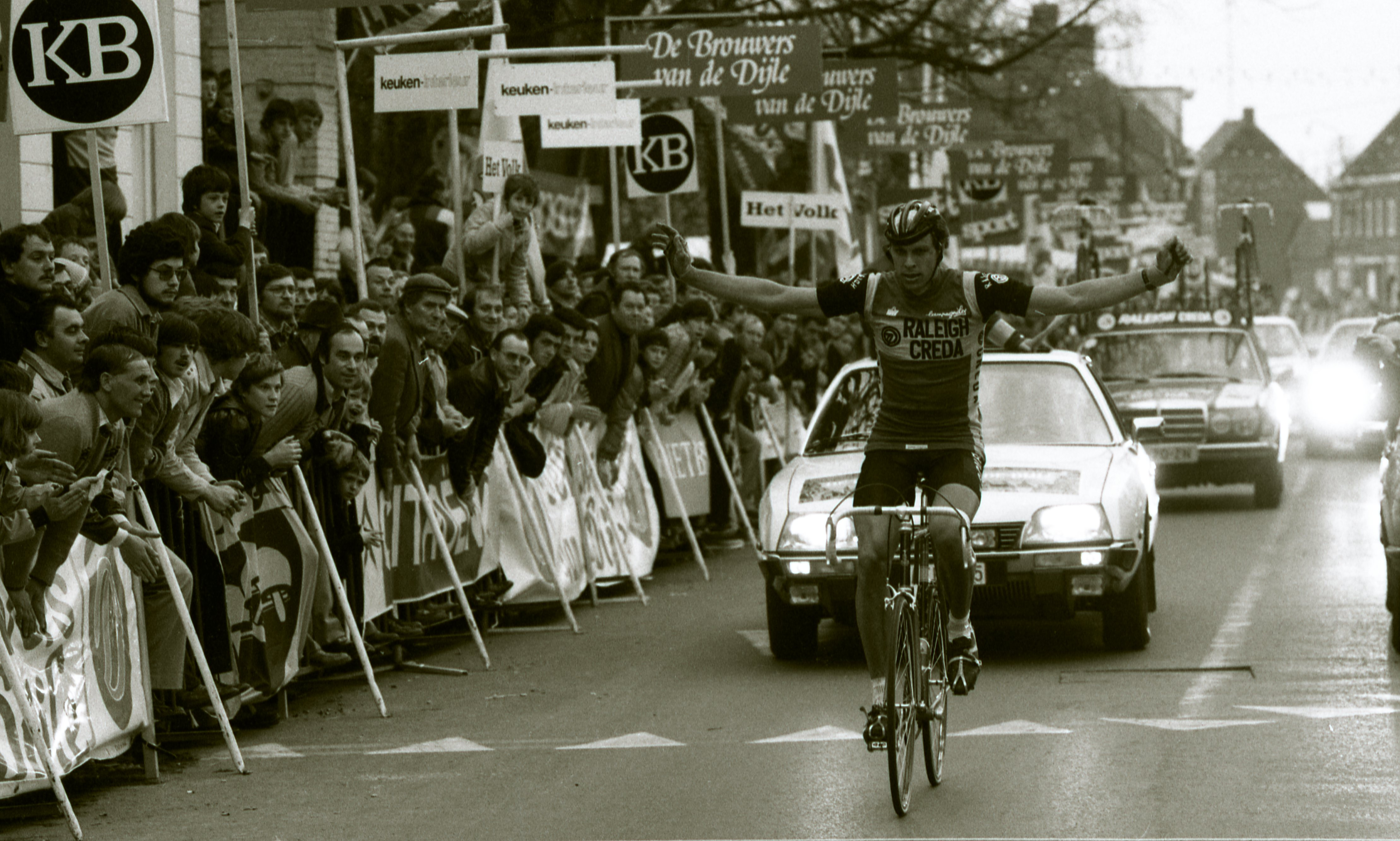
- Frank Hoste at the finish

Race details
- Dates: 29 March 1981
- Stages: 1
- Distance: 202 km (125.5 mi)
- Winning time: 5h 18' 00"

Results
	Winner	Frank Hoste (BEL)
	Second	Cees Priem (NED)
	Third	Gerrit Van Gestel (BEL)

The 1981 Dwars door België was the 36th edition of the Dwars door Vlaanderen cycle race and was held on 29 March 1981. The race started and finished in Waregem. The race was won by Frank Hoste.

== General classification ==
Final general classification

Rank	Rider	Time
1	Frank Hoste (BEL)	5h 18' 00"
2	Cees Priem (NED)	+ 1' 12"
3	Gerrit Van Gestel (BEL)	+ 1' 12"
4	Leo van Vliet (NED)	+ 3' 25"
5	Guido Van Sweevelt (BEL)	+ 4' 20"
6	Jacques van Meer (NED)	+ 4' 20"
7	Eddy Vanhaerens (BEL)	+ 5' 50"
8	Jos Schipper (NED)	+ 6' 05"
9	Walter Dalgal (BEL)	+ 6' 05"
10	Walter Planckaert (BEL)	+ 6' 30"
