= Marc Demeyer =

Belgian cyclist (1950–1982)

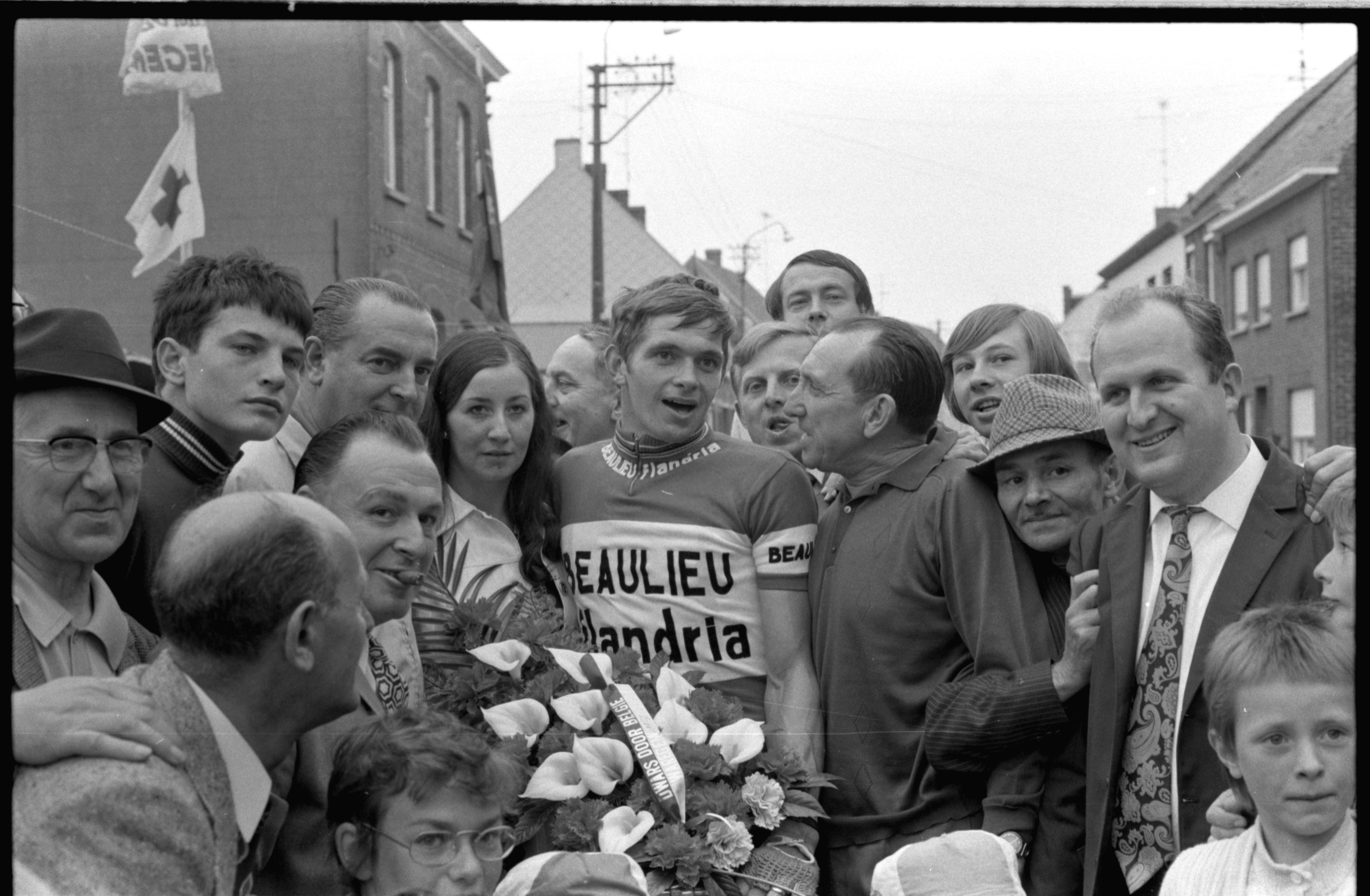
- Demeyer (centered) after his Dwars door België victory in 1972 (Collection KOERS Museum)

Personal information
- Full name: Marc Demeyer
- Nicknames: De Beul van Outrijve (The Executioner of Outrijve); Markie Meyers
- Born: 19 April 1950 Avelgem, Belgium
- Died: 20 January 1982 (aged 31) Merelbeke, Belgium

Cycling career
- Sport: Cycling
- Discipline: Road
- Role: Rider

Professional teams
- 1972–1979: Beaulieu–Flandria
- 1980–1981: IJsboerke–Warncke Eis
- 1982: Splendor–Wickes Bouwmarkt–Europ Decor

Major wins
- Grand Tours Tour de France Intermediate sprints classification (1973, 1975) 2 individual stages (1978, 1979) Giro d'Italia 2 individual stages (1977) One-day races and Classics Paris–Roubaix (1976) Dwars door België (1972)

Marc Demeyer (19 April 1950 – 20 January 1982) was a professional road racing cyclist from Avelgem, Belgium. Although known as the "master servant" for Freddy Maertens, the powerful Demeyer was able to win 60 professional road races. He died of a heart attack at the age of 31.

Demeyer turned professional in 1972 for the Flandria team managed by Briek Schotte. He signed the contract while resting it on a car beside the start of Dwars door België, which he then won. Shortly afterwards he won the Grand Prix d'Isbergues.

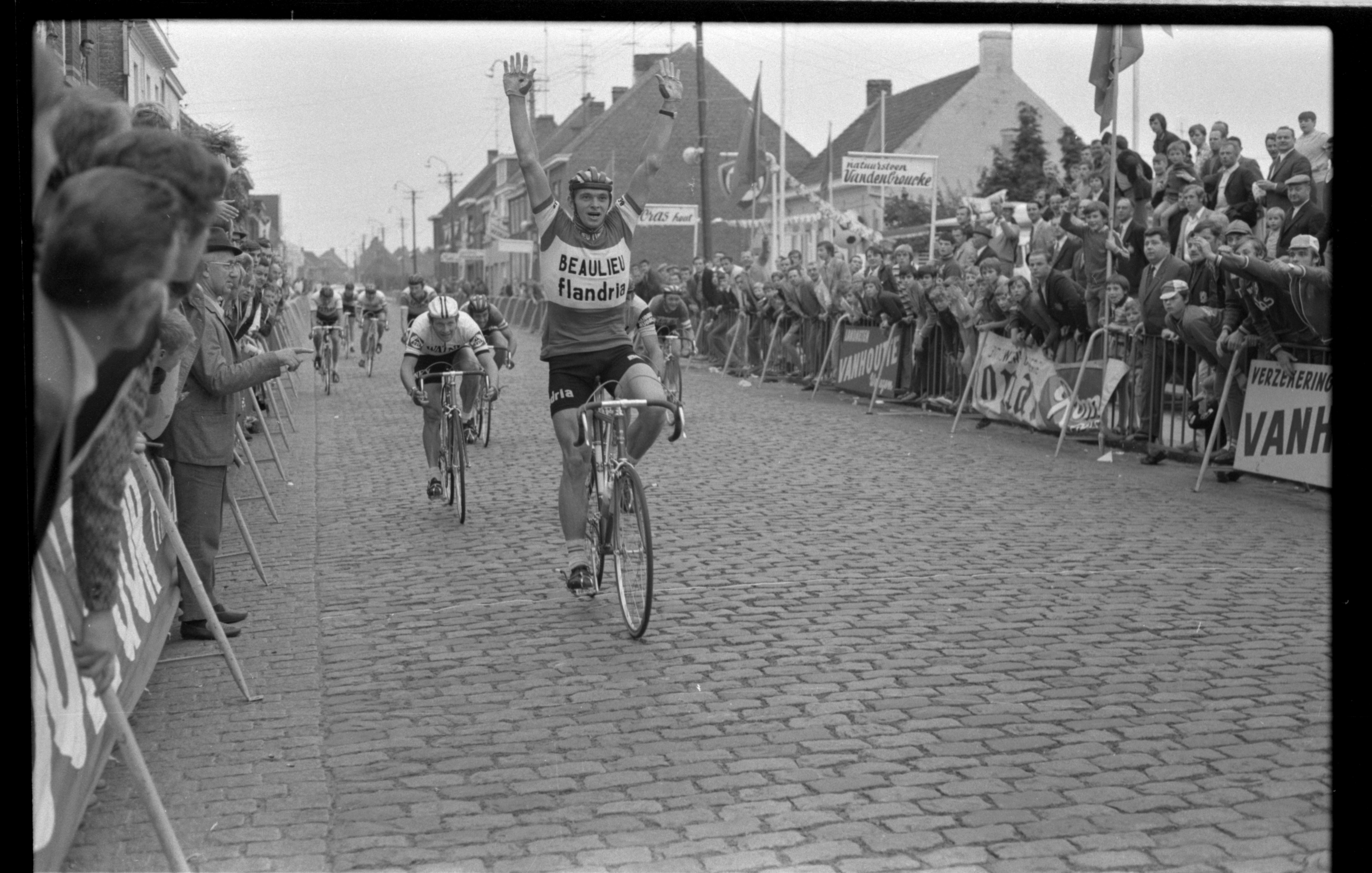
Marc Demeyer winning 1972 Dwars door België in Waregem

Demeyer was one of the so-called "Three Musketeers", riding with and for Freddy Maertens and Michel Pollentier He led out sprints for Maertens in particular but could win them for himself, including stages of the Tour de France. He rode the Tour six times, finishing 72nd in 1973, 41st in 1974, 42nd in 1975, 56th in 1976, 49th in 1978 and 57th in 1979.

He won the intermediate sprints competition, known then as Points Chaud ('hot spot sprints') in the Tours of 1973 and 1975. He won two stages: the 19th in 1978 from Lausanne to Belfort, and the 14th in 1979 from Belfort to Evian-les-Bains. In 1974 he won Paris–Brussels and two years later Paris–Roubaix.

In January 1982, two weeks after an ambitious-looking Demeyer was presented as the new signing of Splendor, he died of a heart attack. Various causes were subsequently mentioned, including suicide.

== Honours ==
Demeyer was particularly suited to the cobbled Classics and won the 1976 edition of Paris-Roubaix, famously captured in Jorgen Leth’s film A Sunday in Hell.

Demeyer was honored in the 2012 edition of Paris–Roubaix.

A book Marc Demeyer-Een Flandrien uit Outrijve by Eric Demets was published in 2016.

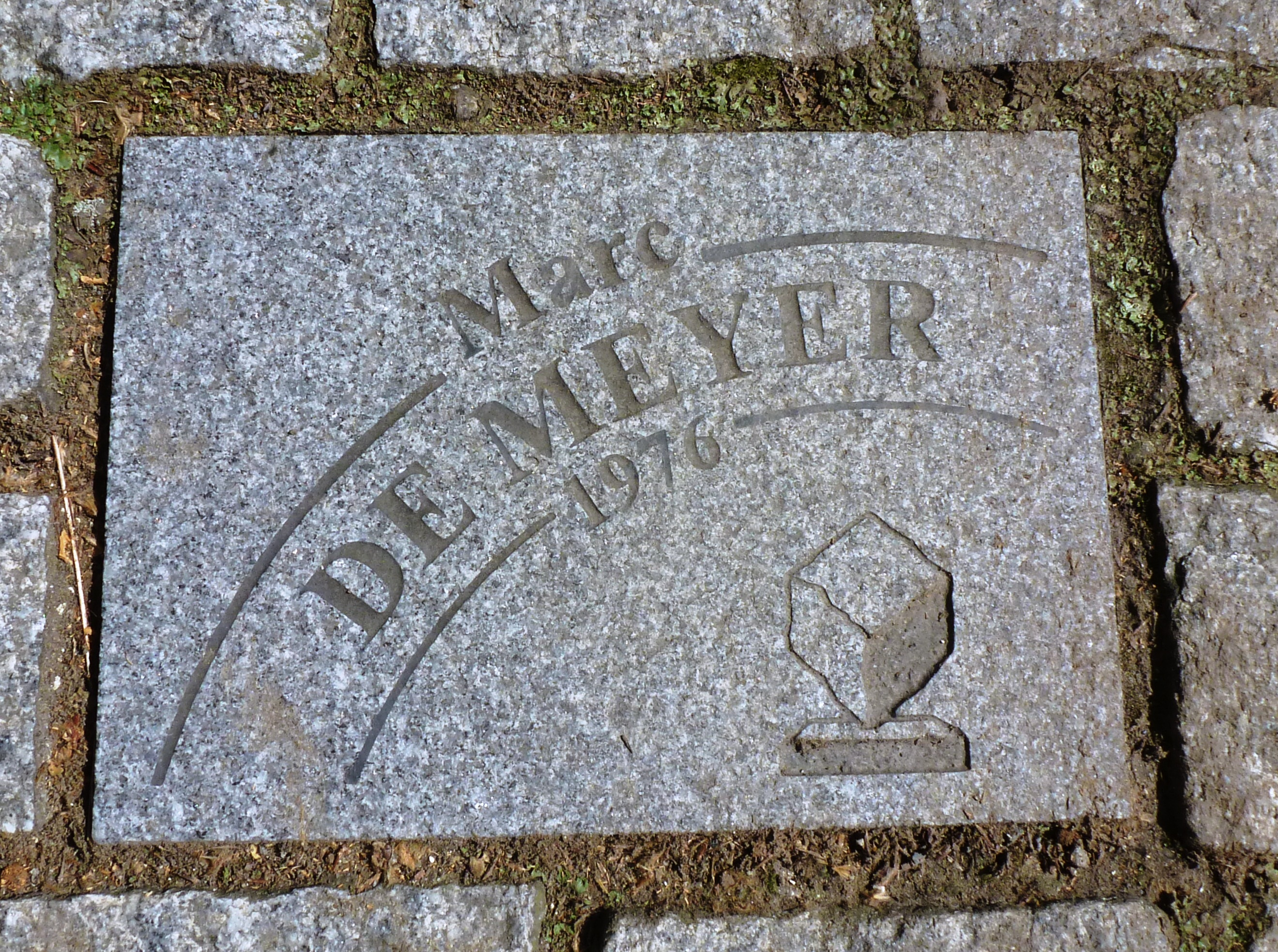
Pavé Marc Demeyer in Roubaix

== Major results ==
1971
1st Ronde Van Vlaanderen Beloften
Peace Race

1st Stages 5 & 9

1972
1st Dwars door België
1st Grand Prix d'Isbergues
1st Grand Prix Fayt-le-Franc
7th Overall Tour d'Indre-et-Loire
1973
1st Grand Prix de Denain
1st Stage 1 Four Days of Dunkirk
1st Intermediate sprints classification Tour de France
3rd Scheldeprijs
9th Kuurne–Brussels–Kuurne
1974
1st Scheldeprijs
1st Grand Prix Pino Cerami
1st Paris–Brussels
3rd Paris–Roubaix
5th Overall Tour de Luxembourg
5th Tour of Flanders
6th Dwars door België
6th Grand Prix Fayt-le-Franc
6th Rund um den Henninger Turm Frankfurt
7th Overall Four Days of Dunkirk

1st Stage 2

8th Overall Tour of Belgium
8th Coppa Ugo Agostoni
9th E3 Prijs Vlaanderen
9th Grote Prijs Jef Scherens
1975
1st Nokere Koerse
1st Stage 3a Four Days of Dunkirk
1st Intermediate sprints classification in the Tour de France
3rd Tour of Flanders
4th Paris–Roubaix
5th Gent–Wevelgem
5th Kuurne–Brussels–Kuurne
5th Rund um den Henninger Turm Frankfurt
6th Scheldeprijs
7th Road race, National Road Championships
9th E3 Prijs Vlaanderen
9th Omloop Het Volk
10th Overall Tour de Luxembourg

1st Stage 2

1976
1st Paris–Roubaix
2nd Dwars door België
3rd Tour of Flanders
6th Overall Four Days of Dunkirk
7th Scheldeprijs
1977
1st Scheldeprijs
1st Omloop van het Houtland
1st Circuit des Frontières
Giro d'Italia

1st Stages 14 & 16a

2nd Paris–Brussels
2nd Grand Prix de Wallonie
3rd Dwars door België
5th Kampioenschap van Vlaanderen
7th Tour of Flanders
7th Grote Prijs Jef Scherens
1978
1st Stage 19 Tour de France
3rd Grand Prix Fayt-le-Franc
4th Grote Prijs Stad Zottegem
6th E3 Prijs Vlaanderen
6th De Kustpijl
9th Omloop Het Volk
10th Paris–Roubaix
1979
1st De Kustpijl
1st Stage 14 Tour de France
1st Stage 4 Critérium du Dauphiné Libéré
1st Stage 2 Tour of Belgium
1st Stage 1 Setmana Catalana de Ciclisme
Grand Prix du Midi Libre

1st Stages 3 & 4

Four Days of Dunkirk

1st Stages 1, 2 & 5a

2nd Tour of Flanders
3rd Züri-Metzgete
4th Gent–Wevelgem
4th La Flèche Wallonne
8th Paris–Roubaix
9th Road race, National Road Championships
9th Omloop Het Volk
1980
1st Circuit des Frontières
1st Stage 3 Grand Prix du Midi Libre
2nd Paris–Brussels
5th Paris–Roubaix
5th Tour of Flanders
6th Grote Prijs Jef Scherens
8th Overall Four Days of Dunkirk
9th Omloop Het Volk
1981
5th Paris–Roubaix
5th Gent–Wevelgem
10th E3 Prijs Vlaanderen

== See also ==
- List of doping cases in cycling
