= 1974 Scheldeprijs =

Race details
- Dates: 30 July 1974
- Stages: 1
- Distance: 246 km (152.9 mi)
- Winning time: 5h 30' 00"

Results
	Winner	Marc Demeyer (BEL)
	Second	Julien Stevens (BEL)
	Third	Englebert Opdebeeck (BEL)

The 1974 Scheldeprijs was the 61st edition of the Scheldeprijs cycle race and was held on 30 July 1974. The race was won by Marc Demeyer.

== General classification ==
Final general classification

Rank	Rider	Time
1	Marc Demeyer (BEL)	5h 30' 00"
2	Julien Stevens (BEL)	+ 0"
3	Englebert Opdebeeck (BEL)	+ 0"
4	Willy Planckaert (BEL)	+ 0"
5	Rik Van Linden (BEL)	+ 0"
6	Frans Verbeeck (BEL)	+ 0"
7	Herman Vrijders (BEL)	+ 0"
8	Roy Schuiten (NED)	+ 0"
9	Piet van Katwijk (NED)	+ 0"
10	Roger Rosiers (BEL)	+ 0"
