= 1981 Omloop Het Volk =

Race details
- Dates: 26 February 1981
- Stages: 1
- Distance: 224 km (139 mi)
- Winning time: 5h 47' 00"

Results
	Winner	Jan Raas (NED)
	Second	Gilbert Duclos-Lassalle (FRA)
	Third	Jean-Luc Vandenbroucke (BEL)

The 1981 Omloop Het Volk was the 36th edition of the Omloop Het Volk cycle race and was held on 26 February 1981. The race started and finished in Ghent. The race was won by Jan Raas.

== General classification ==
Final general classification
Rank	Rider	Time
1	Jan Raas (NED)	5h 47' 00"
2	Gilbert Duclos-Lassalle (FRA)	+ 0"
3	Jean-Luc Vandenbroucke (BEL)	+ 0"
4	Frank Hoste (BEL)	+ 0"
5	Wies van Dongen Jr. (NED)	+ 2' 12"
6	Roger De Vlaeminck (BEL)	+ 2' 18"
7	Jacques Bossis (FRA)	+ 2' 18"
8	Walter Planckaert (BEL)	+ 2' 18"
9	Jos Schipper (NED)	+ 2' 18"
10	William Tackaert (BEL)	+ 2' 18"
