= 1982 Omloop Het Volk =

Race details
- Dates: 6 March 1982
- Stages: 1
- Distance: 217 km (135 mi)
- Winning time: 5h 27' 00"

Results
	Winner	Alfons De Wolf (BEL)
	Second	Graham Jones (GBR)
	Third	Sean Kelly (IRL)

The 1982 Omloop Het Volk was the 37th edition of the Omloop Het Volk cycle race and was held on 6 March 1982. The race started in Ghent and finished in Lokeren. The race was won by Alfons De Wolf.

== General classification ==
Final general classification
Rank	Rider	Time
1	Alfons De Wolf (BEL)	5h 27' 00"
2	Graham Jones (GBR)	+ 35"
3	Sean Kelly (IRL)	+ 37"
4	Benny Van Brabant (BEL)	+ 37"
5	Eddy Planckaert (BEL)	+ 37"
6	Jan Raas (NED)	+ 37"
7	Ludo Delcroix (BEL)	+ 37"
8	Paul Sherwen (GBR)	+ 37"
9	Etienne De Wilde (BEL)	+ 37"
10	Ludo Frijns (BEL)	+ 37"
