= 1981 Milan–San Remo =

Race details
- Dates: 21 March 1981
- Stages: 1
- Distance: 288 km (179 mi)
- Winning time: 6h 41' 06"

Results
	Winner	Alfons De Wolf (BEL)	(Vermeer Thijs)
	Second	Roger De Vlaeminck (BEL)	(DAF Trucks–Côte d'Or)
	Third	Jacques Bossis (FRA)	(Peugeot–Esso–Michelin)

The 1981 Milan–San Remo was the 72nd edition of the Milan–San Remo cycle race and was held on 21 March 1981. The race started in Milan and finished in San Remo. The race was won by Alfons de Wolf of the Vermeer Thijs team.

== General classification ==
Final general classification

Rank	Rider	Team	Time
1	Alfons De Wolf (BEL)	Vermeer Thijs	6h 41' 06"
2	Roger De Vlaeminck (BEL)	DAF Trucks–Côte d'Or	+ 11"
3	Jacques Bossis (FRA)	Peugeot–Esso–Michelin	+ 11"
4	Claudio Torelli (ITA)	Famcucine	+ 11"
5	Peter Kehl (FRG)	Kotter's–GBC	+ 11"
6	Guido Van Calster (BEL)	Splendor–Wickes Bouwmarkt–Europ Decor	+ 11"
7	Freddy Maertens (BEL)	Boule d'Or–Sunair	+ 11"
8	Etienne De Wilde (BEL)	Splendor–Wickes Bouwmarkt–Europ Decor	+ 11"
9	Giuseppe Martinelli (ITA)	Santini–Selle Italia	+ 11"
10	Pierino Gavazzi (ITA)	Magniflex–Olmo	+ 11"
