= 1980 Giro di Lombardia =

Race details
- Dates: 18 October 1980
- Stages: 1
- Distance: 255 km (158 mi)
- Winning time: 7h 08' 00"

Results
	Winner	Alfons De Wolf (BEL)	(Boule d'Or–Studio Casa)
	Second	Alfredo Chinetti (ITA)	(Inoxpran)
	Third	Ludo Peeters (BEL)	(IJsboerke–Warncke Eis)

The 1980 Giro di Lombardia was the 74th edition of the Giro di Lombardia cycle race and was held on 18 October 1980. The race started in Milan and finished in Como. The race was won by Alfons De Wolf of the Boule d'Or team.

== General classification ==
Final general classification

Rank	Rider	Team	Time
1	Alfons De Wolf (BEL)	Boule d'Or–Studio Casa	7h 08' 00"
2	Alfredo Chinetti (ITA)	Inoxpran	+ 0"
3	Ludo Peeters (BEL)	IJsboerke–Warncke Eis	+ 0"
4	Theo de Rooij (NED)	IJsboerke–Warncke Eis	+ 1' 25"
5	Hennie Kuiper (NED)	Peugeot–Esso–Michelin	+ 1' 25"
6	Roberto Ceruti (ITA)	Gis Gelati	+ 1' 25"
7	Jean-Luc Vandenbroucke (BEL)	La Redoute–Motobécane	+ 2' 32"
8	Silvano Contini (ITA)	Bianchi–Piaggio	+ 2' 32"
9	Wladimiro Panizza (ITA)	Gis Gelati	+ 2' 32"
10	Mario Beccia (ITA)	Hoonved–Bottecchia	+ 3' 20"
