= 1982 Gent–Wevelgem =

Race details
- Dates: 7 April 1982
- Stages: 1
- Distance: 255 km (158 mi)
- Winning time: 6h 15' 00"

Results
	Winner	Frank Hoste (BEL)	(TI–Raleigh–Campagnolo)
	Second	Eddy Vanhaerens (BEL)	(Safir–Marc)
	Third	Alfons De Wolf (BEL)	(Vermeer Thijs)

The 1982 Gent–Wevelgem was the 44th edition of the Belgian Gent–Wevelgem cycle race and was held on 7 April 1982. The race started in Ghent and finished in Wevelgem. The race was won by Frank Hoste of the TI–Raleigh team.

== General classification ==
Final general classification

Rank	Rider	Team	Time
1	Frank Hoste (BEL)	TI–Raleigh–Campagnolo	6h 15' 00"
2	Eddy Vanhaerens (BEL)	Safir–Marc	+ 12"
3	Alfons De Wolf (BEL)	Vermeer Thijs	+ 12"
4	Eddy Planckaert (BEL)	Splendor–Wickes Bouwmarkt	+ 12"
5	Jan Bogaert (BEL)	Europ Decor	+ 12"
6	Johan van der Velde (NED)	TI–Raleigh–Campagnolo	+ 12"
7	Phil Anderson (AUS)	Peugeot–Shell–Michelin	+ 12"
8	Silvano Contini (ITA)	Bianchi–Piaggio	+ 12"
9	Henk Lubberding (NED)	TI–Raleigh–Campagnolo	+ 12"
10	Gregor Braun (FRG)	Capri Sonne–Campagnolo–Merckx	+ 12"
