= 1982 E3 Prijs Vlaanderen =

1982 E3 Harelbeke
Race details
- Dates: 27 March 1982
- Stages: 1
- Distance: 223 km (139 mi)
- Winning time: 5h 45' 00"

Results
	Winner	Jan Bogaert (BEL)	(Europ Decor)
	Second	Roger De Vlaeminck (BEL)	(DAF Trucks–TeVe Blad)
	Third	Daniel Willems (BEL)	(Boule d'Or–Sunair)

The 1982 E3 Harelbeke was the 25th edition of the E3 Harelbeke cycle race and was held on 27 March 1982. The race started and finished in Harelbeke. The race was won by Jan Bogaert of the Europ Decor team.

== General classification ==
Final general classification

Rank	Rider	Team	Time
1	Jan Bogaert (BEL)	Europ Decor	5h 45' 00"
2	Roger De Vlaeminck (BEL)	DAF Trucks–TeVe Blad	+ 0"
3	Daniel Willems (BEL)	Boule d'Or–Sunair	+ 0"
4	Werner Devos (BEL)	Boule d'Or–Sunair	+ 0"
5	Jan Raas (NED)	TI–Raleigh–Campagnolo	+ 0"
6	Rudy Pevenage (BEL)	Capri Sonne–Campagnolo–Merckx	+ 0"
7	Eddy Planckaert (BEL)	Splendor–Wickes Bouwmarkt	+ 0"
8	Herman Crabbé (BEL)	Europ Decor	+ 0"
9	Dirk Heirweg (BEL)	Van de Ven–Moser	+ 0"
10	Jos Jacobs (BEL)	Vermeer Thijs	+ 0"
