= 1977 Scheldeprijs =

Race details
- Dates: 2 August 1977
- Stages: 1
- Distance: 250 km (155.3 mi)
- Winning time: 5h 52' 00"

Results
	Winner	Marc Demeyer (BEL)
	Second	Ludo Peeters (BEL)
	Third	Ronan De Meyer (BEL)

The 1977 Scheldeprijs was the 64th edition of the Scheldeprijs cycle race and was held on 2 August 1977. The race was won by Marc Demeyer.

== General classification ==
Final general classification

Rank	Rider	Time
1	Marc Demeyer (BEL)	5h 52' 00"
2	Ludo Peeters (BEL)	+ 0"
3	Ronan De Meyer (BEL)	+ 0"
4	Eddy Peelman (BEL)	+ 0"
5	Willy In 't Ven (BEL)	+ 3"
6	Willy Scheers (BEL)	+ 10"
7	Frank Hoste (BEL)	+ 20"
8	Etienne Van der Helst (BEL)	+ 20"
9	Roger Verschaeve (BEL)	+ 25"
10	Willem Peeters (BEL)	+ 36"
