= 1980 Grand Prix d'Automne =

Race details
- Dates: 28 September 1980
- Stages: 1
- Distance: 228 km (141.7 mi)
- Winning time: 5h 47' 06"

Results
	Winner	Daniel Willems (BEL)	(IJsboerke–Warncke Eis)
	Second	Alain Vigneron (FRA)	(Boston–IFI–Mavic)
	Third	Eddy Vanhaerens (BEL)	(Boule d'Or–Studio Casa)

The 1980 Grand Prix d'Automne was the 74th edition of the Paris–Tours cycle race and was held on 28 September 1980. The race started in Blois and finished in Chaville. The race was won by Daniel Willems of the IJsboerke team.

== General classification ==
Final general classification

Rank	Rider	Team	Time
1	Daniel Willems (BEL)	IJsboerke–Warncke Eis	5h 47' 06"
2	Alain Vigneron (FRA)	Boston–IFI–Mavic	+ 17"
3	Eddy Vanhaerens (BEL)	Boule d'Or–Studio Casa	+ 17"
4	Alfons De Wolf (BEL)	Boule d'Or–Studio Casa	+ 17"
5	Etienne De Wilde (BEL)	Splendor–Admiral	+ 17"
6	Jacques Bossis (FRA)	Peugeot–Esso–Michelin	+ 17"
7	Hubert Mathis (FRA)	Miko–Mercier–Vivagel	+ 17"
8	Yvan Lamote (BEL)	Eurobouw–Cambio Rino	+ 17"
9	Jos Jacobs (BEL)	IJsboerke–Warncke Eis	+ 17"
10	Phil Anderson (AUS)	Peugeot–Esso–Michelin	+ 17"
