= 1979 Scheldeprijs =

Race details
- Dates: 31 July 1979
- Stages: 1
- Distance: 251 km (156.0 mi)
- Winning time: 5h 09' 00"

Results
	Winner	Daniel Willems (BEL)
	Second	Frank Hoste (BEL)
	Third	Alfons De Wolf (BEL)

The 1979 Scheldeprijs was the 66th edition of the Scheldeprijs cycle race and was held on 31 July 1979. The race was won by Daniel Willems.

== General classification ==
Final general classification

Rank	Rider	Time
1	Daniel Willems (BEL)	5h 09' 00"
2	Frank Hoste (BEL)	+ 1' 10"
3	Alfons De Wolf (BEL)	+ 1' 10"
4	Gustaaf Van Roosbroeck (BEL)	+ 1' 10"
5	Emile Gijsemans (BEL)	+ 1' 10"
6	Marc Renier (BEL)	+ 1' 10"
7	Willy Teirlinck (BEL)	+ 1' 10"
8	Étienne De Beule (BEL)	+ 1' 10"
9	Danny Clark (AUS)	+ 1' 10"
10	René Dillen (BEL)	+ 1' 10"
