= A Sunday in Hell =

- Directed by: Jørgen Leth
- Written by: Jørgen Leth
- Produced by: Christian Clausen
- Narrated by: David Saunders
- Edited by: Lars Brydesen
- Music by: Gunner Møller Pedersen
- Release date: 1976
- Running time: 111 minutes
- Country: Denmark
- Language: English

A Sunday in Hell (original title: En Forårsdag i Helvede) is a 1976 Danish documentary film directed by Jørgen Leth. The film is a chronology of the 1976 Paris–Roubaix bicycle race from the perspective of participants, organizers and spectators.

== Synopsis ==
Paris–Roubaix is one of the oldest and most consistently documented events among the spring classics. Much of the latter portion is over narrow, cobbled tracks that choke with dust on dry days and become slick and muddy in rain. For the riders, the race involves competing in navigating these irregular surfaces, which increases the likelihood of mechanical failures, such as tire punctures, or rider falls.

The film captures not just the events of the 1976 edition but the atmosphere of a professional race. It begins by introducing the contenders: Eddy Merckx, Roger De Vlaeminck (the previous year's winner), Freddy Maertens, and Francesco Moser, each with their supporting riders (the domestiques), who are charged with helping their team leader win. The film gives views of the team directors, protesters (the race is halted for a while), spectators, mechanics and riders. As the cobbled section is entered the selection begins. Riders puncture, crash, make the wrong move - the race plays out. By the finish in the velodrome in Roubaix only a few are in with a chance. The winner is a surprise (Marc Demeyer), but that is part of the appeal. Post-race the exhausted riders, mired in dirt, give interviews in the velodrome's showers.

"You can see every bead of sweat on the cyclists and every smashed-up ankle. It really makes you never want to get on a bike again. But it is an amazing film." - Nick Fraser, BBC commissioning editor

"Arguably the best film ever made about professional cycling" - Peter Cowie, International Film Guide

== See also ==
- List of films about bicycles and cycling
