= 1978 Tour du Haut Var =

Race details
- Dates: 26 February 1978
- Stages: 1
- Distance: 185 km (115.0 mi)
- Winning time: 5h 09' 01"

Results
	Winner	Freddy Maertens (BEL)
	Second	Joop Zoetemelk (NED)
	Third	Jean-Luc Vandenbroucke (BEL)

The 1978 Tour du Haut Var was the tenth edition of the Tour du Haut Var cycle race and was held on 26 February 1978. The race started in Nice and finished in Seillans. The race was won by Freddy Maertens.

== General classification ==
Final general classification

Rank	Rider	Time
1	Freddy Maertens (BEL)	5h 09' 01"
2	Joop Zoetemelk (NED)	+ 3"
3	Jean-Luc Vandenbroucke (BEL)	+ 1' 55"
4	Herman Van Springel (BEL)	+ 1' 55"
5	Eddy Merckx (BEL)	+ 1' 55"
6	Roger Rosiers (BEL)	+ 1' 55"
7	Ferdi Van Den Haute (BEL)	+ 1' 55"
8	Jan Aling (NED)	+ 1' 55"
9	Alain Meslet (FRA)	+ 1' 55"
10	Hubert Linard (FRA)	+ 1' 55"
