= 1976 Paris–Roubaix =

Race details
- Dates: 11 April 1976
- Distance: 270.5 km (168.1 mi)
- Winning time: 6h 37' 41"

Results
	Winner	Marc Demeyer (BEL)	(Flandria–Velda–West Vlaams Vleesbedrijf)
	Second	Francesco Moser (ITA)	(Sanson)
	Third	Roger De Vlaeminck (BEL)	(Brooklyn)

The 1976 Paris–Roubaix was the 74th edition of the Paris–Roubaix, a classic one-day cycle race in France. The single day event was held on 11 April and stretched 270.5 km (168 mi) from Chantilly to the finish at Roubaix Velodrome. The winner was Marc Demeyer from Belgium. The event was chronicled in Danish documentary filmmaker Jørgen Leth’s A Sunday in Hell

== Results ==
Final results (1–10)
Rank	Rider	Team	Time
1	Marc Demeyer (BEL)	Flandria–Velda–West Vlaams Vleesbedrijf	6h 37' 41"
2	Francesco Moser (ITA)	Sanson	+ 0"
3	Roger De Vlaeminck (BEL)	Brooklyn	+ 0"
4	Hennie Kuiper (NED)	TI–Raleigh–Campagnolo	+ 0"
5	Walter Godefroot (BEL)	IJsboerke–Colnago	+ 1' 36"
6	Eddy Merckx (BEL)	Molteni–Campagnolo	+ 1' 36"
7	Jan Raas (NED)	TI–Raleigh–Campagnolo	+ 1' 36"
8	Jean-Pierre Danguillaume (FRA)	Peugeot–Esso–Michelin	+ 1' 36"
9	Willy Teirlinck (BEL)	Gitane–Campagnolo	+ 1' 45"
10	Frans Verbeeck (BEL)	IJsboerke–Colnago	+ 1' 45"

== See also ==
- A Sunday in Hell, a 1976 Danish documentary film about the race
