= 1983 Scheldeprijs =

Race details
- Dates: 2 August 1983
- Stages: 1
- Distance: 242 km (150.4 mi)
- Winning time: 5h 46' 00"

Results
	Winner	Jan Bogaert (BEL)
	Second	Ludo Schurgers (BEL)
	Third	Frank Hoste (BEL)

The 1983 Scheldeprijs was the 70th edition of the Scheldeprijs cycle race and was held on 2 August 1983. The race was won by Jan Bogaert.

== General classification ==
Final general classification

Rank	Rider	Time
1	Jan Bogaert (BEL)	5h 46' 00"
2	Ludo Schurgers (BEL)	+ 0"
3	Frank Hoste (BEL)	+ 0"
4	Emile Gijsemans (BEL)	+ 0"
5	Werner Devos (BEL)	+ 0"
6	Mario van Vlimmeren (NED)	+ 0"
7	Marc Van Den Brande (BEL)	+ 0"
8	Ronan De Meyer (BEL)	+ 0"
9	Eddy Vanhaerens (BEL)	+ 0"
10	Romain Costermans (BEL)	+ 0"
