= Eddy Vanhaerens =

Belgian cyclist (born 1954)

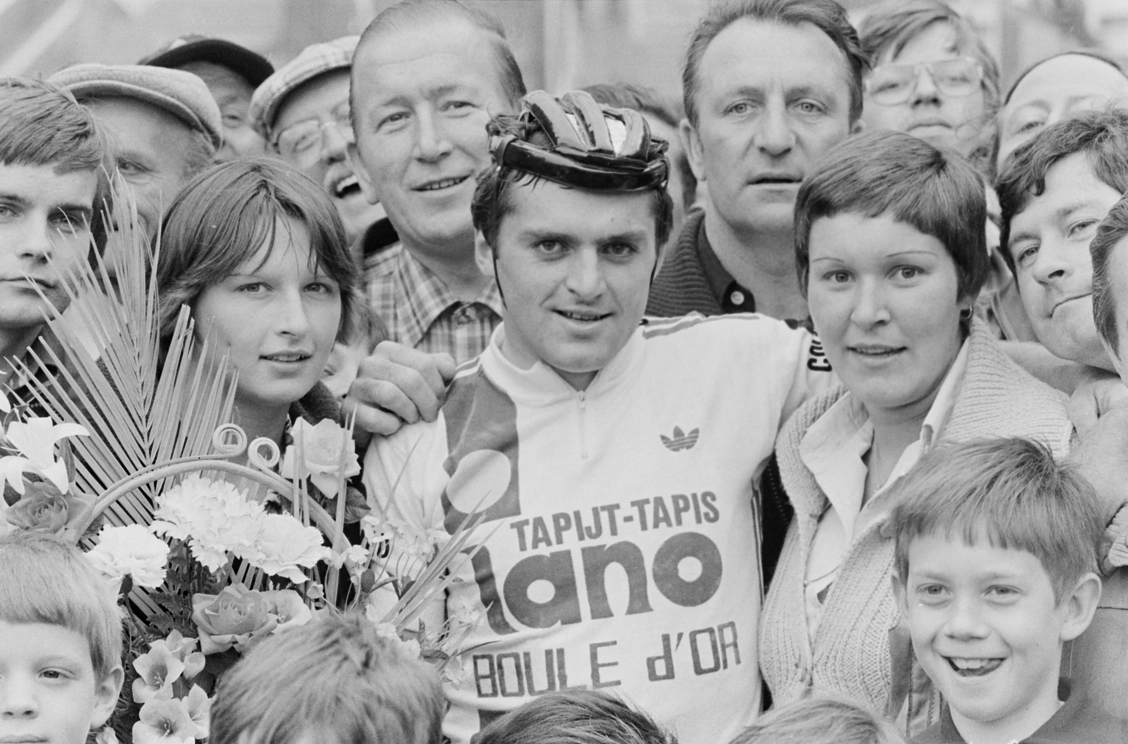

Personal information
- Full name: Eddy Vanhaerens
- Born: February 23, 1954 (age 72) Torhout, Belgium

Cycling career
- Sport: Cycling
- Discipline: Road
- Role: Rider

Professional teams
- 1977: Ebo–Superia
- 1978: Carlos–Galli–Alan
- 1979–1981: Lano–Boule d'Or
- 1982–1984: Safir–Marc
- 1985: Euro-Soap–Crack
- 1986: Fangio–Lois–Mavic
- 1987–1988: Sigma–Fina

Major wins
- Vuelta a España, 2 stages (1982); Omloop van het Houtland (1982); Brussels–Ingooigem (1985); Kampioenschap van Vlaanderen (1985)

Eddy Vanhaerens (born 23 February 1954) is a Belgian former racing cyclist.

== Major results ==
1976
1st Omloop van de Westhoek
2nd Kattekoers
1977
1st Stage 3a Volta a Catalunya
2nd Schaal Sels
2nd Omloop van de Vlaamse Scheldeboorden
2nd Omloop Mandel-Leie-Schelde
2nd Omloop van het Zuidwesten
2nd GP du Tournaisis
7th Grand Prix Cerami
1978
3rd GP du Tournaisis
6th Omloop van het Houtland
8th GP Stad Vilvoorde
8th De Kustpijl
9th Kampioenschap van Vlaanderen
9th Schaal Sels
1980
1st Stage 5b Four Days of Dunkirk
2nd Grote Prijs Marcel Kint
3rd Paris–Tours
1981
4th Kampioenschap van Vlaanderen
7th Dwars door België
7th Ronde van Limburg
8th Gent–Wevelgem
8th E3 Prijs Vlaanderen
8th Brussels–Ingooigem
1982
1st Grand Prix de Denain
1st Stages 15a & 19 Vuelta a España
1st Omloop van het Houtland
1st Stage 2 Ronde van Nederland
2nd Road race, National Road Championships
2nd Overall Vuelta a Aragón

1st Points classification
1st Stages 1, 2 & 3a

2nd Gent–Wevelgem
2nd GP Stad Zottegem
2nd Omloop van het Houtland
3rd Dwars door België
6th Kuurne–Brussels–Kuurne
7th Nokere Koerse
1983
1st Stages 1 & 7 Vuelta a Aragón
3rd Omloop van het Houtland
4th Nationale Sluitingprijs
5th Grand Prix Impanis-Van Petegem
9th Scheldeprijs
10th Nationale Sluitingprijs
1984
1st Stage 3 Volta a Catalunya
3rd Circuit des Frontières
4th Omloop van het Houtland
1985
1st Kampioenschap van Vlaanderen
1st Brussels–Ingooigem
3rd Nationale Sluitingprijs
9th Le Samyn
1986
1st Stage 2 Danmark Rundt
2nd Omloop Schelde-Durme
3rd Brussels–Ingooigem
9th Grand Prix Impanis-Van Petegem
9th De Kustpijl
1987
8th Omloop van het Houtland
8th Nokere Koerse
9th Kuurne–Brussels–Kuurne
10th Kampioenschap van Vlaanderen
1988
4th Kampioenschap van Vlaanderen
