= 1983 Omloop Het Volk =

Race details
- Dates: 5 March 1983
- Stages: 1
- Distance: 220 km (140 mi)
- Winning time: 5h 33' 00"

Results
	Winner	Alfons De Wolf (BEL)
	Second	Jan Raas (NED)
	Third	Luc Colijn (BEL)

The 1983 Omloop Het Volk was the 38th edition of the Omloop Het Volk cycle race and was held on 5 March 1983. The race started and finished in Ghent. The race was won by Alfons De Wolf.

== General classification ==
Final general classification
Rank	Rider	Time
1	Alfons De Wolf (BEL)	5h 33' 00"
2	Jan Raas (NED)	+ 0"
3	Luc Colijn (BEL)	+ 2' 21"
4	Kim Andersen (DEN)	+ 2' 21"
5	Etienne De Wilde (BEL)	+ 2' 21"
6	Johan van der Velde (NED)	+ 2' 21"
7	Adri van der Poel (NED)	+ 2' 21"
8	Jozef Lieckens (BEL)	+ 2' 21"
9	Rudy Matthijs (BEL)	+ 3' 54"
10	Ludo Peeters (BEL)	+ 3' 54"
