= Omloop van het Zuidwesten =

Belgian cycling race

Race details
- Date: March, July
- Region: Flanders, Belgium
- English name: Circuit of the South-West
- Local name(s): Omloop van Zuid-West Vlaanderen (in Dutch), Circuit du Sud-Ouest (in French)
- Discipline: Road
- Competition: Cat. 1.2
- Type: One-day race

History
- First edition: 1963
- Editions: 20
- Final edition: 1982
- First winner: Marcel Ongenae (BEL)
- Most wins: Roger De Vlaeminck (BEL); (2 wins)
- Final winner: Alain Van Hoornweder (BEL)

The Omloop van het Zuidwesten was a Belgian cycling race organized for the last time in 1982.

The course was around 185 kilometres (115 mi), with Hulste as both start and finish place.

The competition's roll of honor includes the successes of Roger De Vlaeminck, Walter Godefroot and Patrick Sercu.

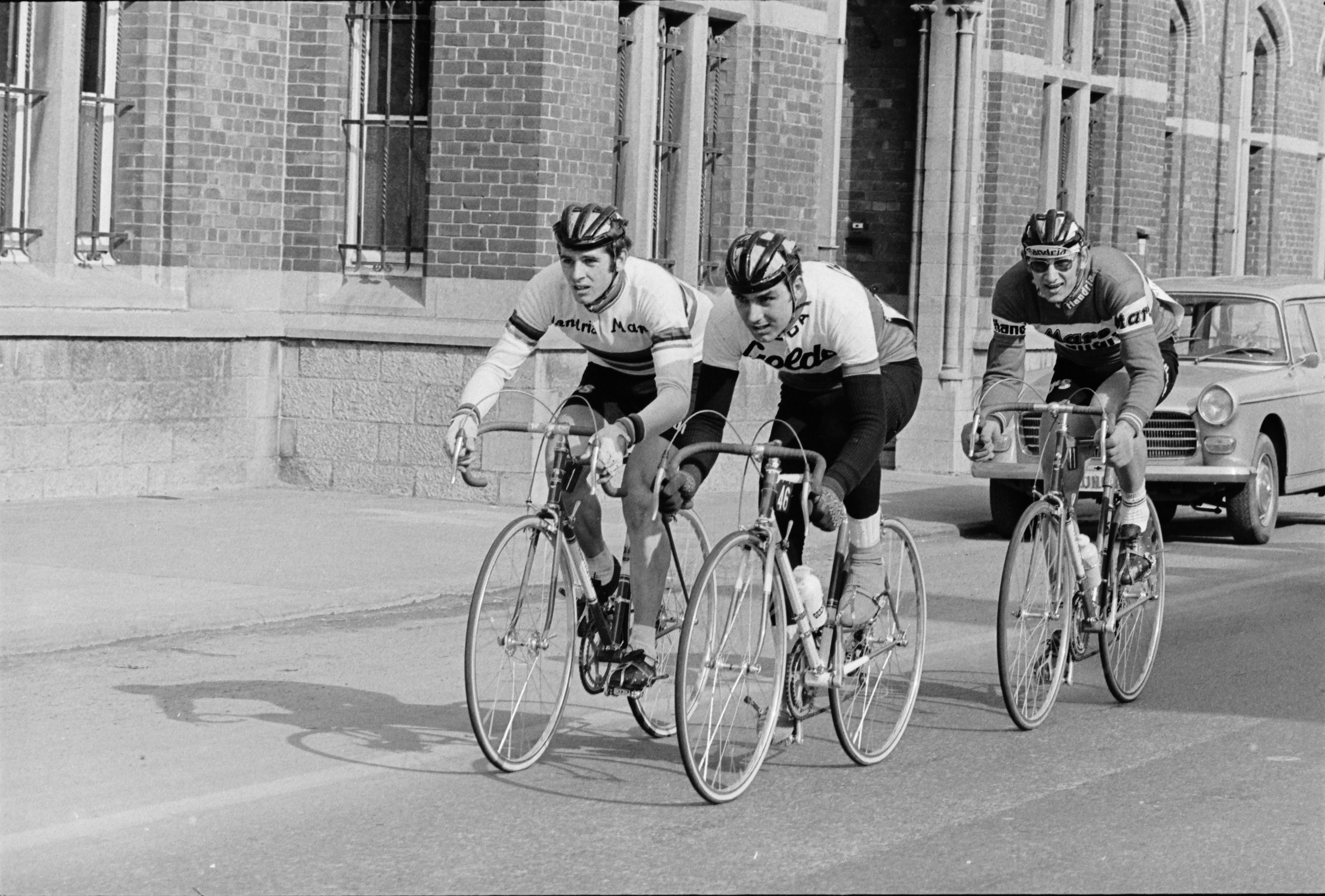
UCI World Champion Jean-Pierre Monseré (left) in the Omloop van het Zuidwesten 1971

== Winners ==
Year	Winner	Second	Third
1963	(Belgium) Marcel Ongenae	(Belgium) Henri De Wolf	(Belgium) Willy Raes
1964	(Belgium) Gustaaf Van Vaerenbergh	(Belgium) Walter Boucquet	(Belgium) Robert Seneca
1965	(Belgium) Walter Godefroot	(Belgium) Willy Bocklant	(Belgium) Hubert Criel
1966	(Belgium) Léopold Vanden Neste	(Belgium) Ludo Van Dromme	(Belgium) Jaak De Boever
1967	(Belgium) Emiel Coppens	(Belgium) Bruno Janssens	(Belgium) Jérôme Kegels
1968	(Belgium) Daniel Van Ryckeghem	(Belgium) Willy Vanneste	(Belgium) André Hendryckx
1969	(Belgium) Noël Vantyghem	(Belgium) Christian Callens	(Belgium) Jean-Marie Sohier
1970	(Belgium) Herman Vanspringel	(Belgium) Georges Vanconingsloo	(Belgium) Etienne Sonck
1971	(Belgium) Roger De Vlaeminck	(Belgium) Jean-Pierre Monseré	(Belgium) Alain Santy
1972	(Belgium) Joseph Abelshausen	(Belgium) Dirk Baert	(Belgium) Fernand Hermie
1973	(Belgium) Roger De Vlaeminck	(Belgium) Gustaaf Hermans	(Belgium) Victor Van Schil
1974	(Belgium) Bernard Draux	(Belgium) Eddy Verstraeten	(Belgium) Roger Rosiers
1975	(Netherlands) Richard Bukacki	(Belgium) José Vanackere	(Belgium) Eddy Van Hoof
1976	(Belgium) Jean-Luc Vandenbroucke	(Belgium) Ronan De Meyer	(Belgium) José Vanackere
1977	(Netherlands) Adrianus Schipper	(Belgium) Eddy Vanhaerens	(France) Marcel Tinazzi
1978	(Netherlands) Dirk Wayenbergh	(Belgium) Gery Verlinden	(France) Frank Hoste
1979	(Belgium) Willem Peeters	(Belgium) Jean-Luc Vandenbroucke	(Belgium) Carlos Cuyle
1980	(Belgium) Patrick Sercu	(Belgium) Dirk Gilbert	(Belgium) Charles Jochums
1981	(Belgium) Benny Van Brabant	(Belgium) Danny Ameloot	(Netherlands) Hubert Pronk
1982	(Belgium) Alain Van Hoornweder	(Belgium) Luc Colijn	(Belgium) Gérard Blockx
