= Frank Hoste =

Belgian cyclist (born 1955)

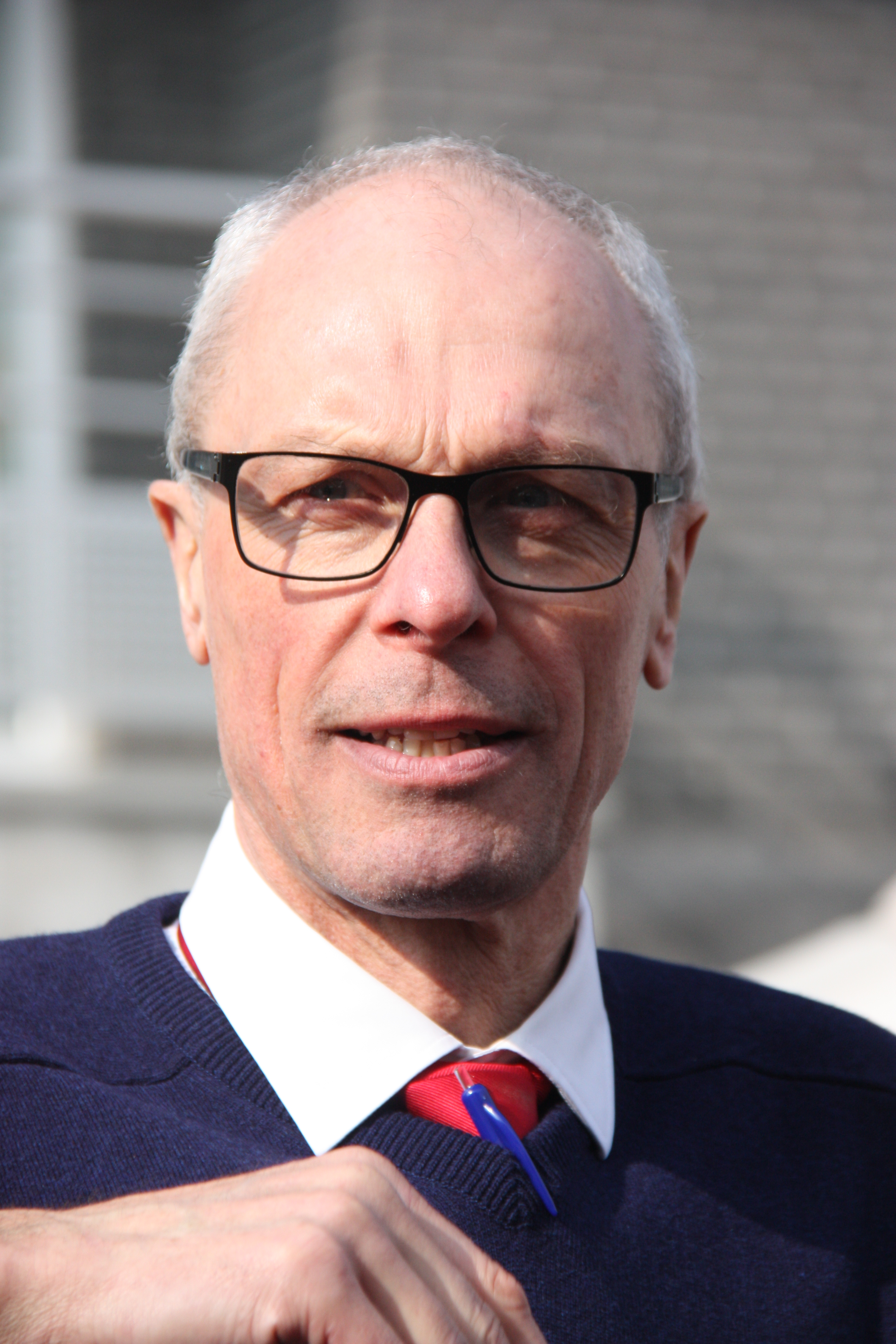
- Hoste in 2018

Personal information
- Full name: Frank Hoste
- Born: 29 August 1955 (age 71) Ghent, Belgium

Cycling career
- Sport: Cycling
- Current team: Retired
- Discipline: Road
- Role: Rider
- Rider type: Sprinter

Professional teams
- 1977–1978: IJsboerke–Colnago
- 1979–1980: Marc Zeep Savon–Superia
- 1981–1982: TI–Raleigh–Creda
- 1983–1984: Europ Decor–Dries
- 1985: Del Tongo–Colnago
- 1986–1987: Fagor
- 1988–1990: AD Renting–Mini-Flat–Enerday
- 1990–1991: La William-Saltos

Major wins
- Grand Tours Tour de France Points classification (1984) 5 individual stages (1982, 1984, 1986) 3 TTT stages (1981, 1982) Giro d'Italia 2 individual stages (1983, 1985) 1 TTT stages (1985) One-day races and Classics National Road Race Championships (1982) Gent–Wevelgem (1982)

Frank Hoste (born 29 August 1955) is a retired Belgian professional road racing cyclist who was a professional from 1977 until 1991. He won the points classification in the Tour de France in 1984.

He rode in 13 grand tours throughout his career, eight times in the Tour de France and five times in the Giro d'Italia. All total he won five stages in the Tour de France and during the 1983 Giro d'Italia he came in the top 5 on eight different stages, one of which was a stage win. Hoste started a bicycle factory after his professional career.

== Major results ==
1976
3rd Flèche Ardennaise
9th Circuit du Hainaut
1977
3rd GP Union Dortmund
6th Grand Prix de Fourmies
7th Scheldeprijs
8th Circuit du Hainaut
10th Overall Ronde van Nederland
1978
1st Grand Prix de Denain
2nd Dwars door België
2nd Le Samyn
3rd Grote Prijs Jef Scherens
3rd Omloop van het Zuidwesten
10th Omloop van het Waasland
1979
2nd E3 Prijs Vlaanderen
2nd Scheldeprijs
2nd Druivenkoers Overijse
3rd Omloop Het Volk
6th Dwars door België
6th Omloop van het Houtland
7th Grote Prijs Jef Scherens
10th Overall Three Days of De Panne
1980
8th Overall Three Days of De Panne
10th Herinneringsprijs Dokter Tistaert – Prijs Groot-Zottegem
1981
1st Dwars door België
1st Prologue Tour Méditerranéen
Tour de France

1st Stages 1b (TTT) & 4 (TTT)

2nd Kampioenschap van Vlaanderen
2nd Circuit des Frontières
3rd Overall Étoile de Bessèges
4th Omloop Het Volk
5th Overall Four Days of Dunkirk

1st Stage 3

7th Road race, National Road Championships
10th Scheldeprijs
1982
1st Road race, National Road Championships
1st Overall Four Days of Dunkirk

1st Stage 3

1st Gent–Wevelgem
Tour de France

1st Stages 8 & 9a (TTT)

4th Dwars door België
4th Brussels–Ingooigem
4th Omloop van het Leiedal
7th Grand Prix Eddy Merckx
8th Druivenkoers Overijse
1983
Tour de Suisse

1st Stages 1, 2 & 8

Volta a Catalunya

1st Points classification
1st Stages 1 & 3a

Vuelta a las Tres Provincias

1st Stages 2 & 3a

Vuelta a Andalucía

1st Stages 5a & 5b (ITT)

1st Stage 16a Giro d'Italia
3rd Gent–Wevelgem
3rd Scheldeprijs
5th Overall Three Days of De Panne

1st Stage 2

5th Züri-Metzgete
8th Paris–Roubaix
1984
1st Grand Prix de Wallonie
Tour de France

1st Points classification
1st Stages 1, 6 & 21

Vuelta a Aragón

1st Stages 2 & 5

2nd Trofeo Luis Puig
3rd Road race, National Road Championships
3rd Kampioenschap van Vlaanderen
7th Grand Prix Eddy Merckx
1985
Giro d'Italia

1st Stages 2 (TTT) & 6

1st Stage 5a Vuelta a Andalucía
5th Trofeo Laigueglia
1986
1st GP du canton d'Argovie
1st Stage 15 Tour de France
Volta a Catalunya

1st Stages 1 & 3

6th Brussels–Ingooigem
9th Paris–Tours
1987
5th Herinneringsprijs Dokter Tistaert – Prijs Groot-Zottegem
1988
2nd Omloop van het Houtland
3rd GP du canton d'Argovie
3rd De Kustpijl
6th Overall Tour de Luxembourg

1st Stage 4a

6th Circuit des Frontières
7th Overall Kellogg's Tour
8th Nationale Sluitingsprijs
1989
2nd Scheldeprijs
7th Overall Tour of Belgium
7th Paris–Brussels
10th Omloop van de Vlaamse Scheldeboorden
1990
1st Omloop van de Westkust
8th Kampioenschap van Vlaanderen
9th GP du canton d'Argovie
1991
7th Nokere Koerse

=== Grand Tour general classification results timeline ===
Grand Tour	1977	1978	1979	1980	1981	1982	1983	1984	1985	1986	1987	1988	1989	1990	1991
Vuelta a España	Did not contest during career														
Giro d'Italia	—	—	—	—	—	—	114	—	117	136	119	—	125	—	—
Tour de France	—	—	—	DNF	95	DNF	—	100	—	116	DNF	124	DNF	—	—

Legend
—	Did not compete
DNF	Did not finish
