= 1982 Grand Prix d'Automne =

Race details
- Dates: 10 October 1982
- Stages: 1
- Distance: 228 km (141.7 mi)
- Winning time: 5h 26' 13"

Results
	Winner	Jean-Luc Vandenbroucke (BEL)
	Second	Pierino Gavazzi (ITA)
	Third	Alfons De Wolf (BEL)

The 1982 Grand Prix d'Automne was the 76th edition of the Paris–Tours cycle race and was held on 10 October 1982. The race started in Blois and finished in Chaville. The race was won by Jean-Luc Vandenbroucke.

== General classification ==
Final general classification

Rank	Rider	Time
1	Jean-Luc Vandenbroucke (BEL)	5h 26' 13"
2	Pierino Gavazzi (ITA)	+ 56"
3	Alfons De Wolf (BEL)	+ 56"
4	Éric Dall'Armelina (FRA)	+ 56"
5	Ferdi Van Den Haute (BEL)	+ 56"
6	Hennie Kuiper (NED)	+ 56"
7	Ludo Peeters (BEL)	+ 56"
8	Jacques Hanegraaf (NED)	+ 56"
9	Werner Devos (BEL)	+ 56"
10	Theo de Rooij (NED)	+ 56"
