= 1982 Dwars door België =

Race details
- Dates: 28 March 1982
- Stages: 1
- Distance: 198 km (123.0 mi)
- Winning time: 5h 20' 00"

Results
	Winner	Jan Raas (NED)
	Second	Jean-Luc Vandenbroucke (BEL)
	Third	Eddy Vanhaerens (BEL)

The 1982 Dwars door België was the 37th edition of the Dwars door Vlaanderen cycle race and was held on 28 March 1982. The race started and finished in Waregem. The race was won by Jan Raas.

== General classification ==
Final general classification

Rank	Rider	Time
1	Jan Raas (NED)	5h 20' 00"
2	Jean-Luc Vandenbroucke (BEL)	+ 0"
3	Eddy Vanhaerens (BEL)	+ 26"
4	Frank Hoste (BEL)	+ 1' 01"
5	Leo van Vliet (NED)	+ 1' 01"
6	Pascal Guyot (FRA)	+ 1' 01"
7	Marc Goossens (BEL)	+ 1' 01"
8	Cees Priem (NED)	+ 1' 01"
9	Hans Langerijs (NED)	+ 1' 01"
10	Eddy Furniere (BEL)	+ 1' 01"
