= 1981 Tour du Haut Var =

Race details
- Dates: 22 February 1981
- Stages: 1
- Distance: 174 km (108.1 mi)
- Winning time: 4h 37' 19"

Results
	Winner	Jacques Bossis (FRA)
	Second	Francis Castaing (FRA)
	Third	Jean-Luc Vandenbroucke (BEL)

The 1981 Tour du Haut Var was the 13th edition of the Tour du Haut Var cycle race and was held on 22 February 1981. The race started in Nice and finished in Seillans. The race was won by Jacques Bossis.

== General classification ==
Final general classification

Rank	Rider	Time
1	Jacques Bossis (FRA)	4h 37' 19"
2	Francis Castaing (FRA)	+ 14"
3	Jean-Luc Vandenbroucke (BEL)	+ 14"
4	Graham Jones (GBR)	+ 14"
5	Pierre-Raymond Villemiane (FRA)	+ 14"
6	Sean Kelly (IRL)	+ 14"
7	Phil Anderson (AUS)	+ 14"
8	Joseph Fuchs (SUI)	+ 14"
9	Stefan Mutter (SUI)	+ 14"
10	Régis Clère (FRA)	+ 14"
