= 1981 Scheldeprijs =

Race details
- Dates: 28 July 1981
- Stages: 1
- Distance: 242 km (150 mi)
- Winning time: 5h 38' 00"

Results
	Winner	Ad Wijnands (NED)
	Second	Willy Teirlinck (BEL)
	Third	Jos Jacobs (BEL)

The 1981 Scheldeprijs was the 68th edition of the Scheldeprijs cycle race and was held on 28 July 1981. The race was won by Ad Wijnands.

== General classification ==
Final general classification

Rank	Rider	Time
1	Ad Wijnands (NED)	5h 38' 00"
2	Willy Teirlinck (BEL)	+ 10"
3	Jos Jacobs (BEL)	+ 25"
4	Adri van der Poel (NED)	+ 25"
5	Adri van Houwelingen (NED)	+ 25"
6	Léo Van Thielen (BEL)	+ 25"
7	Johan van der Velde (NED)	+ 25"
8	Robert McIntosh (RSA)	+ 25"
9	Gery Verlinden (BEL)	+ 25"
10	Frank Hoste (BEL)	+ 25"
