= Englebert Opdebeeck =

Belgian cyclist

Personal information
- Born: 27 December 1946 (age 79) Weerde, Belgium

Cycling career
- Sport: Cycling

Englebert Opdebeeck (born 27 December 1946) is a former Belgian cyclist. He competed in the team time trial at the 1968 Summer Olympics.
