= Jozef Schoeters =

Belgian cyclist (1947–1998)

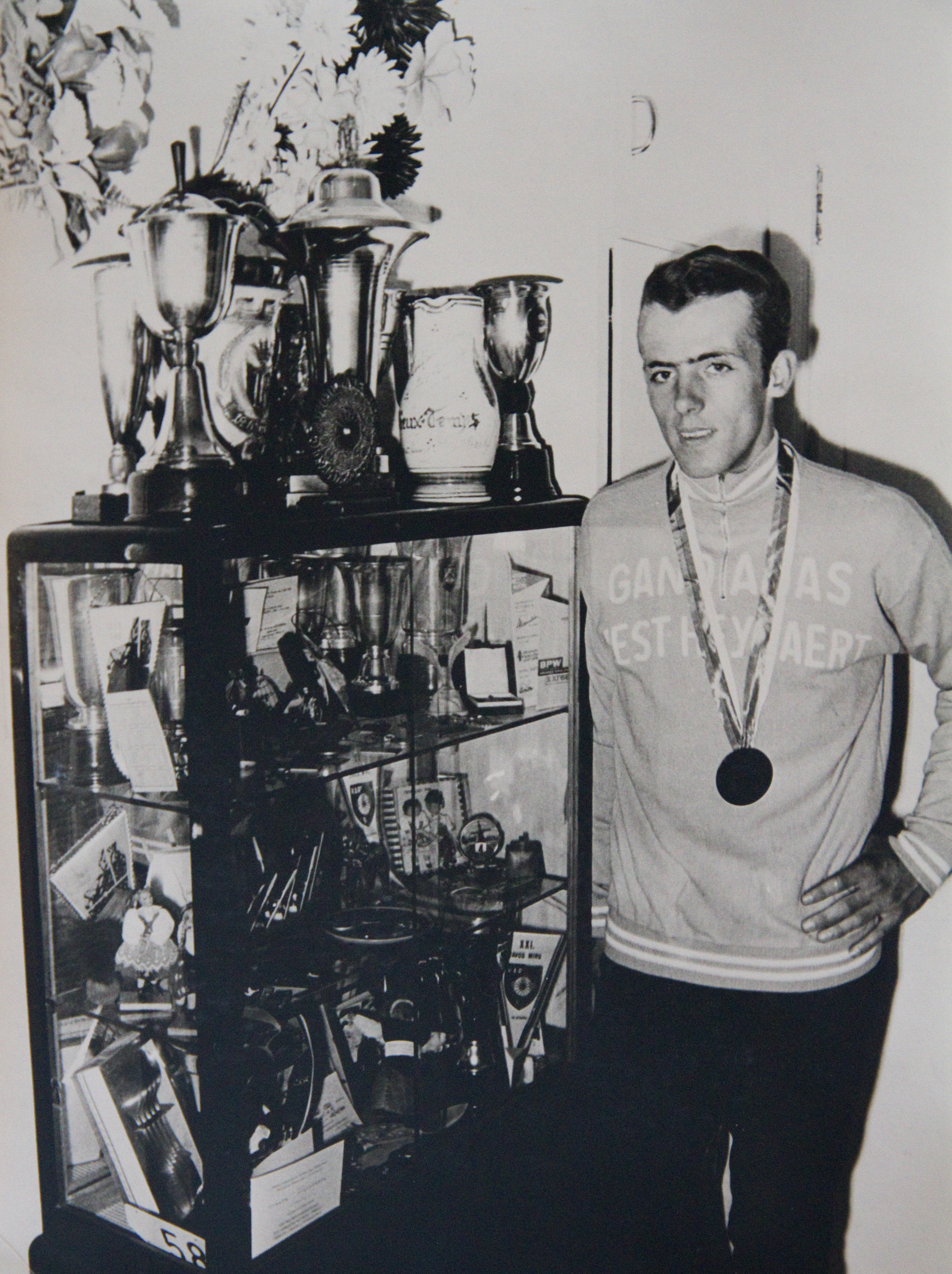

Personal information
- Born: 12 May 1947 Antwerp, Belgium
- Died: 1 May 1998 (aged 50) Lokeren, Belgium

Cycling career
- Sport: Cycling

Jozef Schoeters (12 May 1947 – 1 May 1998) was a Belgian cyclist. He competed in the individual road race at the 1968 Summer Olympics.
