= Gerrit Van Gestel =

Belgian cyclist

Personal information
- Born: 20 January 1958 (age 68) Beerse, Belgium

Cycling career
- Sport: Cycling

Gerrit Van Gestel (born 20 January 1958) is a Belgian former cyclist. He competed in the team time trial event at the 1980 Summer Olympics.
