= Jan Mattheus =

Belgian cyclist

Personal information
- Born: 3 April 1965 (age 61) Torhout, Belgium

Cycling career
- Sport: Cycling

Jan Mattheus (born 3 April 1965) was a Belgian cyclist, and is currently a high school mathematics teacher. He competed in the road race at the 1988 Summer Olympics.
