= Circuit de Wallonie =

Belgian one-day road cycling race

Race details
- Date: July (1966–1990, 2003); June (1991, 2015–2016); May (1992–2002, 2004–2014, since 2017)
- Region: Wallonia
- Discipline: Road
- Competition: UCI Europe Tour
- Type: One-day race
- Organiser: Royal Courrier Sport Baulet
- Web site: lecircuitdewallonie.be

History
- First edition: 1966
- Editions: 59 (as of 2026)
- First winner: Roger Rosiers (BEL)
- Most wins: Jozef Schoeters (BEL); Stefan Van Leeuwe (BEL); (2 wins)
- Most recent: Riley Sheehan (USA)

Circuit de Wallonie is a cycling race held annually in Belgium since 1966. It has been a category 1.1 event on the UCI Europe Tour sincee 2019, having upgraded from 1.2 status, which the race obtained in 2011. Until 2003 the race was held under the name Circuit du Hainaut.

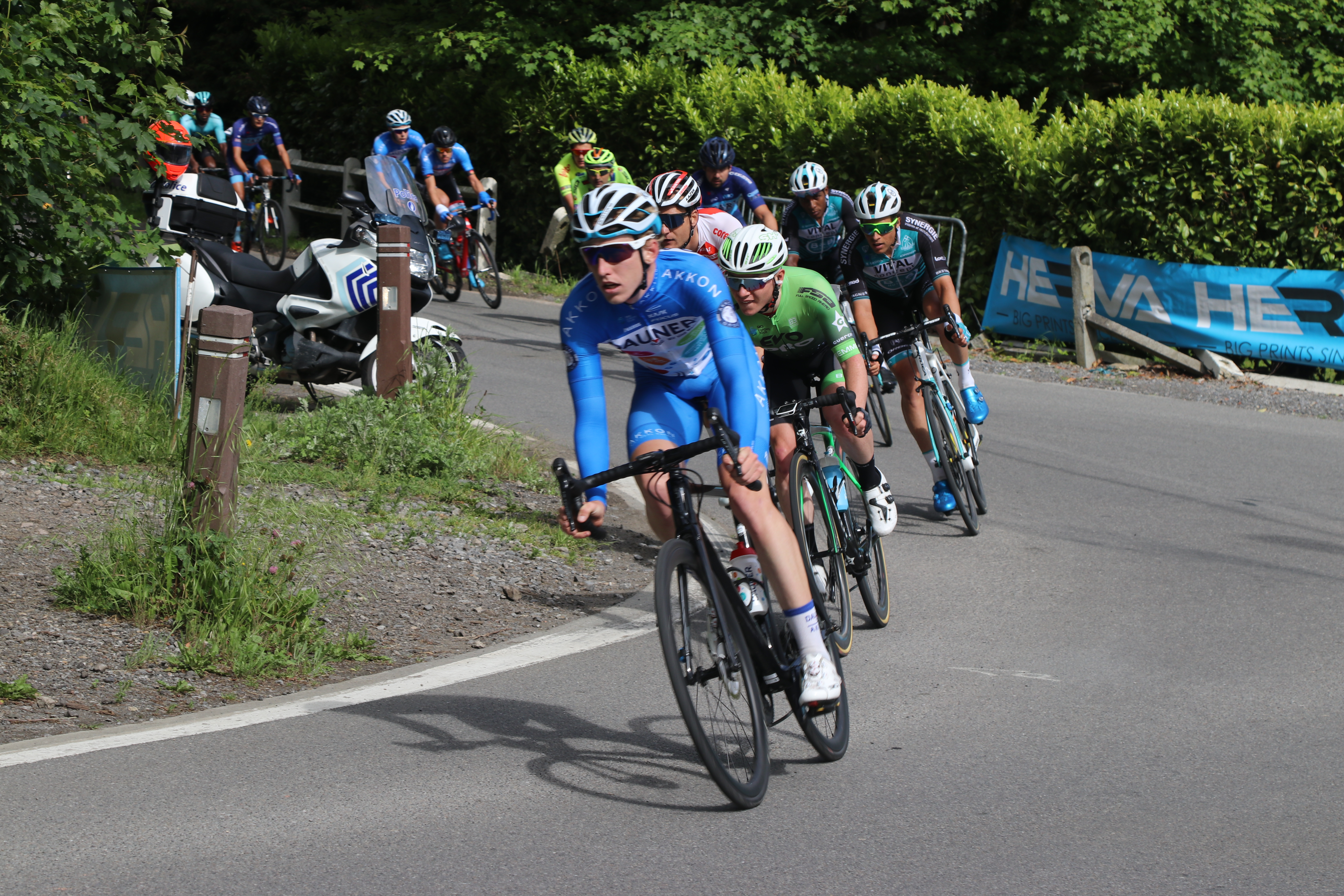
2019 Circuit de Wallonie passing Nalinnes

== Winners ==
Year	Country	Rider	Team
1966	Belgium	Roger Rosiers	
1967	Belgium	Jozef Schoeters	
1968	Belgium	Jozef Schoeters	
1969	Belgium	Paul Crapez	
1970	Belgium	Willy Abbeloos	
1971	Belgium	Michel Van Vlierden	
1972	Belgium	Lucien De Brauwere	
1973	Belgium	Roger De Beukelaer	
1974	Belgium	Joseph Gijsemans	
1975	Belgium	Ferdi Van Den Haute	
1976	Belgium	André Van Den Steen	
1977	Belgium	René Martens	
1978	Belgium	Daniel Willems	
1979	Belgium	Etienne De Wilde	
1980	Belgium	Paul Haghedooren	
1981	Belgium	Kurt Dockx	
1982	Belgium	Patrick Cocquyt	
1983	Belgium	Diederik Foubert	
1984	Belgium	Stefan Van Leeuwe	
1985	Belgium	Stefan Van Leeuwe	
1986	Belgium	Peter Roes	
1987	Belgium	Peter De Clercq	
1988	Belgium	Jean-François Brasseur	
1989	Belgium	Michel Stasse	
1990	Belgium	Johan Remels	
1991	Belgium	Fabrice Dejardin	
1992	Belgium	Nico Desmet	
1993	Netherlands	Casper Van der Meer	
1994	Belgium	Yannick Cornelis	
1995	Belgium	Rik Verbrugghe	
1996	Belgium	Fabien De Waele	
1997	Belgium	Wim Heselmans	
1998	Belgium	Danny Swinnen	
1999	Netherlands	Marcel Duijn	
2000	Belgium	Jan Verstraeten	
2001	Kazakhstan	Dimitry Muravyev	
2002	Belgium	Johan Vansummeren	
2003	Belgium	Preben Van Hecke	
2004	Belgium	Gianni Meersman	
2005	Belgium	Erik Lievens	
2006	Belgium	Nikolas Maes	
2007	Belgium	Francis De Greef	
2008	Belgium	Ben Hermans	
2009	Belgium	Romain Zingle	
2010	Belgium	Thomas Degand	
2011	Colombia	Diego Tamayo	Team WIT
2012	South Africa	Reinardt Janse van Rensburg	MTN–Qhubeka
2013	Belgium	Sébastien Delfosse	Crelan–Euphony
2014	Netherlands	Maurits Lammertink	Cycling Team Jo Piels
2015	Belgium	Stef Van Zummeren	Verandas Willems
2016	France	Kévin Lalouette	EC Raismes Petite–Forêt
2017	Netherlands	Maarten van Trijp	Metec–TKH
2018	Denmark	Mikkel Frølich Honoré	Team Virtu Cycling
2019	France	Thomas Boudat	Total Direct Énergie
2020	No race due to the COVID-19 pandemic in Belgium		
2021	France	Christophe Laporte	Cofidis
2022	Italy	Andrea Pasqualon	Intermarché–Wanty–Gobert Matériaux
2023	Belgium	Jordi Meeus	Bora–Hansgrohe
2024	Belgium	Arnaud De Lie	Lotto–Dstny
2025	No race		
2026	United States	Riley Sheehan	NSN Cycling Team
