= Daniel Willems =

Belgian cyclist

- Willems in 1982

Personal information
- Full name: Daniel Willems
- Born: 16 August 1956 Herentals, Belgium
- Died: 2 September 2016 (aged 60) Vorselaar, Belgium

Cycling career
- Sport: Cycling
- Discipline: Road
- Role: Rider

Professional teams
- 1978–1981: Ijsboerke
- 1982–1983: Boule d'Or
- 1984: Murella
- 1985: Safir-Van de Ven

Major wins
- Grand Tours Tour de France 4 individual stages (1981, 1982) One-day races and Classics Scheldeprijs (1979) Paris–Tours (1980) La Flèche Wallonne (1981)

Daniel Willems (16 August 1956 – 2 September 2016) was a Belgian road bicycle racer. Health problems ended his career in 1986. He competed in the team time trial event at the 1976 Summer Olympics.

== Major results ==
1976
5th Overall Ruban Granitier Breton
1977
1st Road race, National Amateur Road Championships
1st Overall Ruban Granitier Breton

1st Stages 1a & 4a (ITT)

4th Flèche Ardennaise
6th Ronde Van Vlaanderen Beloften
1978
1st Kampioenschap van Vlaanderen
1st Grote Prijs Stad Zottegem
1st Circuit du Hainaut
2nd Ronde Van Vlaanderen Beloften
3rd Kattekoers
7th Overall Ronde van Nederland
1979
1st Overall Four Days of Dunkirk

1st Stage 4b

1st Overall Tour of Belgium

1st Stage 4b

1st Scheldeprijs
1st Brabantse Pijl
1st Rund um den Henninger-Turm
2nd Overall Vuelta a Andalucía
2nd Critérium des As
3rd Overall Ronde van Nederland
3rd Tour of Flanders
3rd Liège–Bastogne–Liège
4th Paris–Tours
4th Circuit des Frontières
5th Overall Paris–Nice
5th Overall Three Days of De Panne
6th Gent–Wevelgem
6th Züri-Metzgete
8th Milan–San Remo
9th Circuit du Hainaut
1980
1st Overall Vuelta a Andalucía

1st Stages 3 & 5a

1st Paris–Tours
1st Ronde van Limburg
1st Grand Prix Le Télégramme
2nd Overall Tour of Belgium

1st Stage 5

2nd Grand Prix Eddy Merckx
4th Rund um den Henninger-Turm
5th Overall Tour de Suisse

1st Points classification
1st Combination classification
1st Prologue, Stages 1, 2, 3, 4 & 5 (ITT)

5th Züri-Metzgete
7th Paris–Roubaix
7th Amstel Gold Race
8th Circuit du Hainaut
9th Overall Tour de Romandie
9th Tour du Haut Var
1981
1st La Flèche Wallonne
1st Critérium des As
1st Heistse Pijl
Tour de France

1st Stages 11 & 19

1st Stage 3 GP du Midi-Libre
1st Stage 1a Tour of Belgium
3rd Züri-Metzgete
3rd Rund um den Henninger-Turm
4th Grand Prix Eddy Merckx
5th Overall Setmana Catalana de Ciclisme

1st Stages 1, 4 & 5

6th Overall Tour de l'Aude

1st Stage 3

6th Trofeo Laigueglia
10th Road race, National Road Championships
10th Tour of Flanders
1982
1st Grand Prix Eddy Merckx
Tour Midi-Pyrénées

1st Stages 1a & 2

2nd Overall Three Days of De Panne

1st Stage 3

2nd Le Samyn
3rd E3 Prijs Vlaanderen
6th Overall Tirreno–Adriatico
7th Overall Tour de France

1st Stages 3 & 20

7th Overall Four Days of Dunkirk

1st Stage 1

7th Brabantse Pijl
8th Road race, National Road Championships
8th Overall Tour de l'Aude
1983
2nd Grand Prix Eddy Merckx

=== Grand Tour general classification results timeline ===
| Grand Tour | 1981 | 1982 | 1983 | 1984 |
|---|---|---|---|---|
| Vuelta a España | — | — | DNF | — |
| Giro d'Italia | — | — | — | 71 |
| Tour de France | DNF | 7 | DNF | — |

Legend
| — | Did not compete |
| DNF | Did not finish |
