= KOERS Museum =

KOERS. Museum of Cycle Racing
- KOERS. Museum van de Wielersport

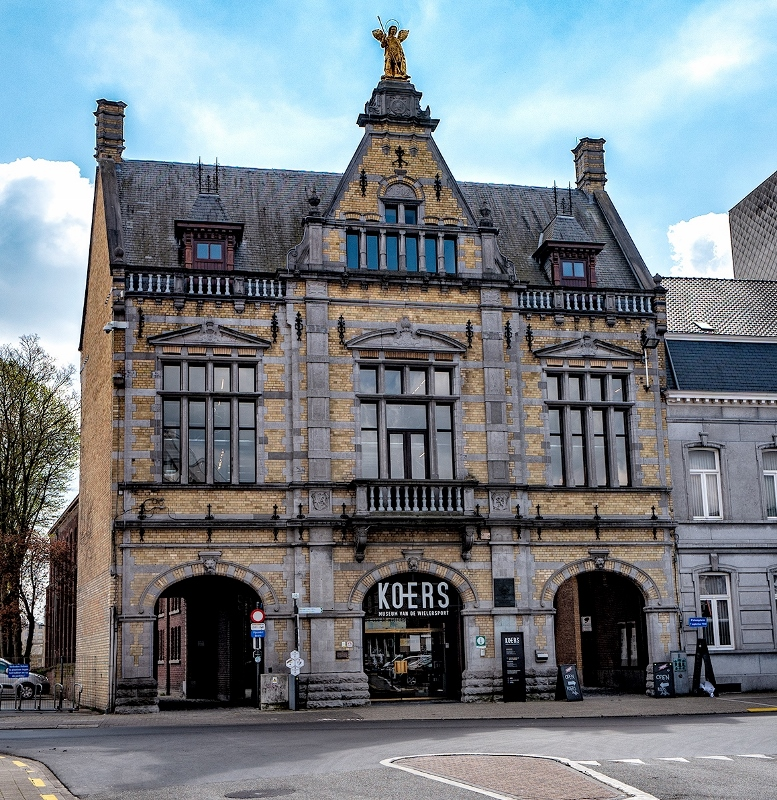
- Entrance facade
- Established: 1998
- Location: Roeselare, Belgium
- Coordinates: 50°56′40″N 3°07′37″E
- Type: Sport museum
- Curator: Thomas Ameye
- Website: https://koersmuseum.be/en

KOERS. Museum van de wielersport. (until 2018 the Cycling Museum - WieMu) is a museum in the Belgian city of Roeselare. The museum shows the history of the bicycle and cycling. It was officially opened on 27 March 1998 at the Polenplein.

== History ==
The Cycling Museum was founded in 1985 as part of the earlier Municipal Museum of Roeselare. The city of Roeselare took that decision because the region can be seen as ‘the cradle of the flandriens’. A lot of flandriens and racing cyclists are born in the region. The municipality proper has known a lot of successful racing cyclists for example Odiel Defraeye, the first Belgian winner of the Tour of France and several world-champions: Jean-Pierre Monseré, Benoni Beheyt, Patrick Sercu and Freddy Maertens. In the beginning, the museum only showed a few old bicycles and organized an exhibition in summer.

=== Replacement ===
In 1998, they made the final decision to replace the old folkloristic museum by a real Cycling Museum, the National Cycling Museum. Ferdy Callewaert was the first conservator until his retirement in 2006. Old-racing cyclist Freddy Maertens worked from 2000 till 2007 at the museum and often, he welcomed the visitors. In 2005 King Albert II visited the museum. The museum name was shorted to ‘WieMu’ in 2010.

=== 2018 renewal ===
After a renovation that started in 2014, the museum re-opened on 8 September 2018. The new name of the museum became "KOERS. Museum van de wielersport". The building currently also holds a tourist service and a pub.

== Collection ==
The museum shows the history of bicycles from 1760 until now: all sorts of old bicycles and modern bicycles used for professional duties, leisure and sport. In the beginning, that was the heart of the collection of the cycling museum. After some years, the museum became more and more specialized in professional cycle-racing, and collected a lot of racing bicycles, cycling trophies and -souvenirs, cycling clothes and portraits of famous racing cyclists.

=== Halls ===
One of the halls is dedicated to the local world-champion Jean-Pierre Monseré, who lost his life as world-champion during a race in 1971. Another hall shows an old workshop of bicycle-maker Hallaert where you can learn about the technical evolution of the bicycle.

=== Documents ===
The cycling museum has a documentation center about cycling with a lot of photos, old newspapers and (cycling-)magazines, program brochures and cycling archives. The museum publishes regular exhibition catalogues or books of exercises. Since 2012 the museum publishes the cycling-historic magazine Etappe.

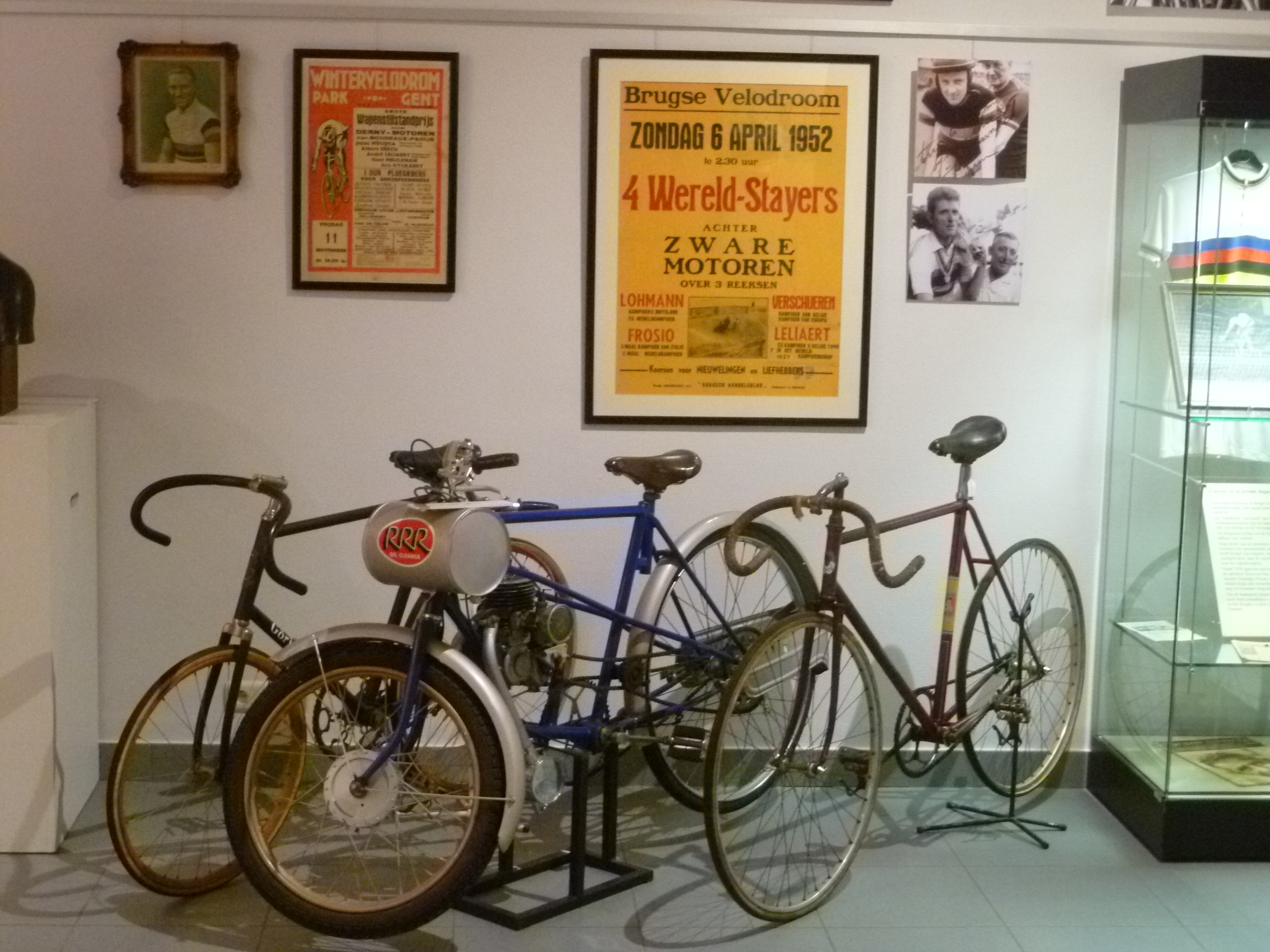
The KOERS museum holds a large collection of bicycles, posters and jerseys.

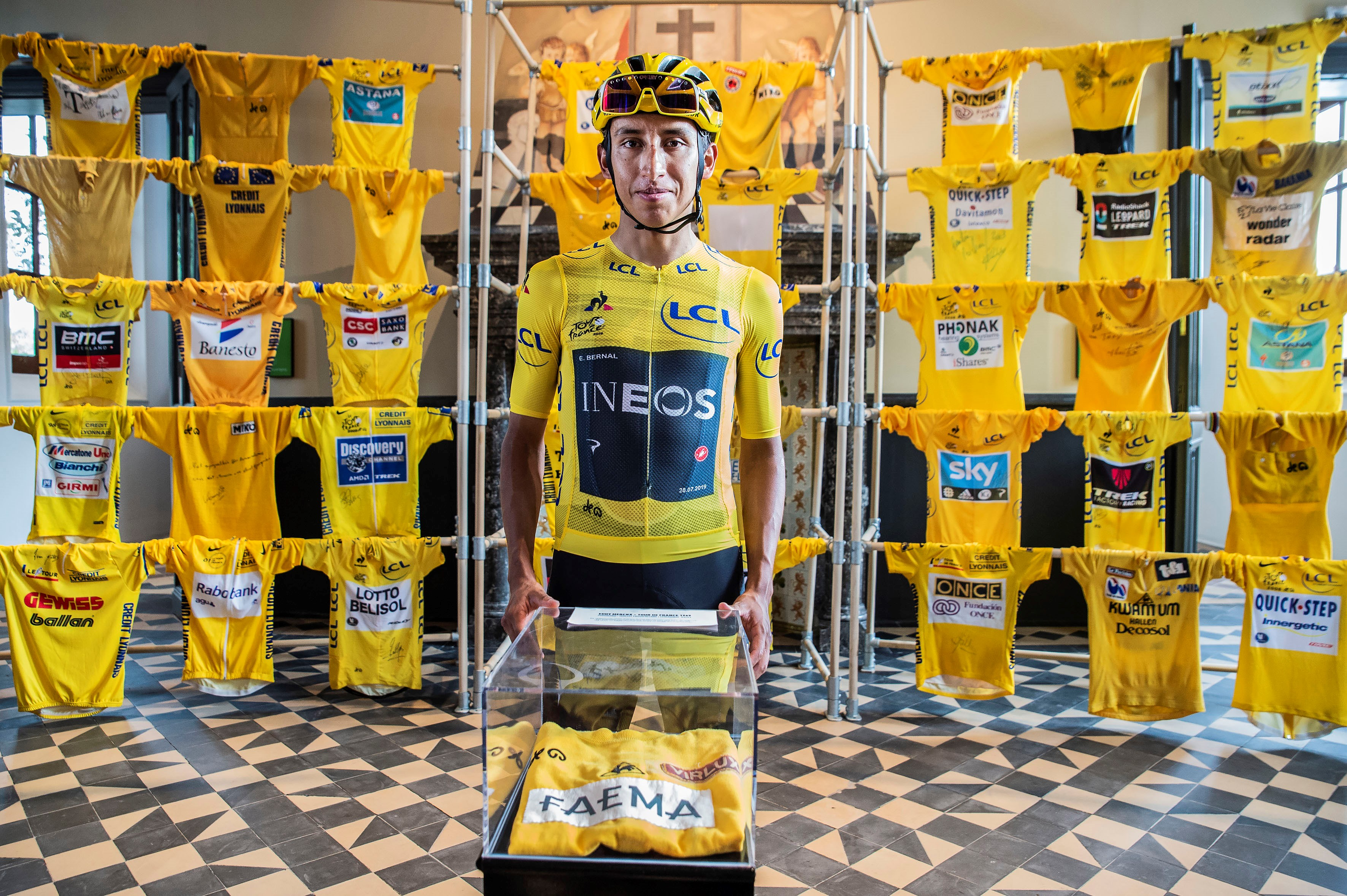
Egan Bernal in 2019, in front of an assortment yellow jerseys of the museum.

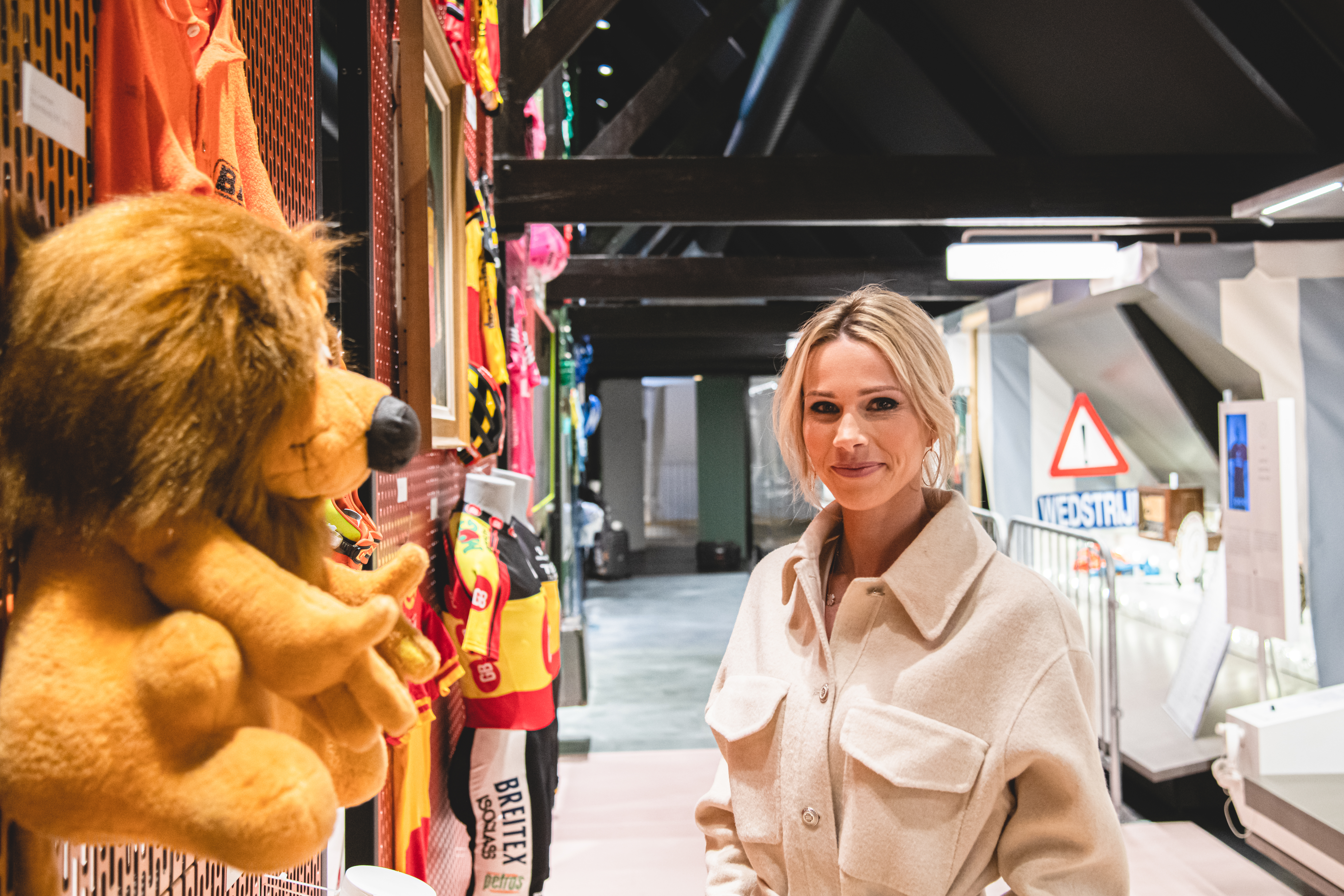
Marion Rousse at the museum in 2023.

== Building ==
Built between 1899 and 1902, the building served as a fire station until 1962. During World War I, German soldiers lived in the station. On 21 July 1917, it was bombed by British aircraft. After the war it was rebuilt. The building was also used for several public services such as a festive hall, a school, sport accommodation and a folkloristic museum. The building is now a classified monument.
