= 1993 Giro d'Italia =

Race details
- Dates: 23 May – 13 June 1993
- Stages: 21
- Distance: 3,702 km (2,300 mi)
- Winning time: 98h 09' 44"

Results
Jersey awarded to the overall winner	Winner	Miguel Induráin (ESP)	(Banesto)
	Second	Piotr Ugrumov (LAT)	(Mecair–Ballan)
	Third	Claudio Chiappucci (ITA)	(Carrera Jeans–Tassoni)
Jersey awarded to the points classification winner	Points	Adriano Baffi (ITA)	(Mercatone Uno–Zucchini–Medeghini)
Jersey awarded to the mountains classification winner	Mountains	Claudio Chiappucci (ITA)	(Carrera Jeans–Tassoni)
Jersey awarded to the young rider classification winner	Young rider	Pavel Tonkov (RUS)	(Lampre–Polti)
Jersey awarded to the intergiro classification winner	Intergiro	Ján Svorada (SVK)	(Lampre–Polti)
	Team	Lampre–Polti	
	Team points	Ariostea	

The 1993 Giro d'Italia, (English: Tour of Italy), was the 76th edition of the race. It started off in Porto Azzurro on 23 May with a split stage, with the first leg being a mass-start stage and the latter an individual time trial. The race ended on 13 June with a stage that stretched 166 km (103.1 mi) from Biella to Milan. Twenty teams entered the race, which was won by Miguel Induráin of the Banesto team. Second and third respectively were the Latvian Piotr Ugrumov and the Italian rider, Claudio Chiappucci. Indurain's victory in the 1993 Giro was his first step in completing the Giro – Tour double – winning the Giro d'Italia and Tour de France in one calendar year – becoming the first rider to repeat this feat in consecutive years.

Moreno Argentin was the first rider to wear the race leader's maglia rosa (English: pink jersey) after winning the opening stage. Argentin held that lead for ten more days before losing it to Miguel Induráin after the conclusion stage 10. Bruno Leali stole the lead away from Indurain after the race's eleventh leg and held it until the end of the fourteenth day of racing. Indurain gained the lead after mountainous stage 14 and then held it all the way to the Giro's finish in Milan.

Indurain became the first Spanish rider to win the Giro d'Italia in consecutive years. Amongst the other classifications that the race awarded, Italian Adriano Baffi of Mercatone Uno–Zucchini–Medeghini won the points competition, Carrera Jeans–Tassoni's Claudio Chiappucci won the mountains classification, Lampre–Polti's Pavel Tonkov completed the Giro as the best rider aged 25 or younger in the general classification, finishing fifth overall, and Ján Svorada of Lampre-Polti won the intergiro competition. Lampre-Polti finished as the winners of the team classification, ranking each of the twenty teams contesting the race by lowest cumulative time. Ariostea finished as winners of the team points classification.

== Teams ==
Twenty teams were invited by the race organizers to participate in the 1993 edition of the Giro d'Italia, seven of which were based outside of Italy. Each team sent a squad of nine riders, which meant that the race started with a peloton of 180 cyclists. Italy (78), France (24), Spain (17), Germany (11), and Colombia (10) all had more than 10 riders. Of these, 69 were riding the Giro d'Italia for the first time. The average age of riders was 27.69 years, ranging from 21–year–old Alexandr Shefer (Navigare–Blue Storm) to 35–year–old Bruno Leali (Mercatone Uno–Zucchini–Medeghini). The team with the youngest average rider age was Banesto (25), while the oldest was GB–MG Maglificio (29). From the riders that began the race, 132 made it to the finish in Milan.

The teams that took part in the race were:

- Amore & Vita–Galatron
- Ariostea
- Artiach–Filipinos–Chiquilin
- Banesto
- Carrera Jeans–Tassoni
- Castorama
- Festina–Lotus
- GAN
- Gatorade–Mega Drive–Kenwood
- GB–MG Maglificio
- Jolly Componibili–Club 88
- Kelme–Xacobeo
- Lampre–Polti
- Eldor–Viner
- Mecair–Ballan
- Mercatone Uno–Zucchini–Medeghini
- Motorola
- Navigare–Blue Storm
- Team Telekom
- ZG Mobili

== Pre-race favorites ==
The starting peloton included the 1992 winner, Miguel Induráin, who had not had a successful start to his 1993 campaign. He hoped to repeat as winner of the Giro and the Tour for the second consecutive year, stating "My main objective remains the Tour de France, but I will still try to win the Giro." If Indurain would win the two Grand Tours in the season, he would be the fourth rider to accomplish winning the Giro and Tour in one season twice in their career. Despite this, Indurain was viewed as the favorite to win the general classification. Maurizio Fondriest (Lampre–Polti) was thought to have entered in peak form after winning several races in the spring campaign, including Milan–San Remo and Tirreno–Adriatico. El Mundo Deportivo writer Javier de Dalmases believed Fondirest would be the first rider to don the race leader's maglia rosa (English: pink jersey). Indurain felt Fondriest was the rider to watch in the race's first week.

Gianni Bugno (Gatorade–Mega Drive–Kenwood), who won the race in 1990, prepared at lengths for the race and was seen as a threat in the time trial stages. Bugno won only one race before the Giro started, the Grand Prix Gippingen earlier in May, but was thought to have a strong showing at the Amstel Gold Race. Author Bill McGann dismissed Bugno saying that his ability to "win at will" had passed. With no victories in the season, 1991 winner and 3rd-place finisher in 1992, Franco Chioccioli (GB–MG Maglificio) was considered a dark–horse contender. Other favorites named for the race included Pavel Tonkov and 1988 winner Andrew Hampsten as contenders for the overall crown. Claudio Chiappucci was thought to be one of the most potent climbers in the race. Specifically, a L'Express writer commented that Chiappucci's performance on the Sestriere time trial in the 1992 Tour de France as an example of his climbing prowess. In addition, he had several second-place finishes in the Giro and Tour the previous year.

Famed sprinters Mario Cipollini and Djamolidine Abdoujaparov did not compete in the race, while Dutch sprinter Jean-Paul van Poppel was going to race in the Giro but was left off the roster before it started. With the aforementioned riders' absence, Dalmases stated that Italian Adriano Baffi would likely win some of the flat stages.

== Route and stages ==
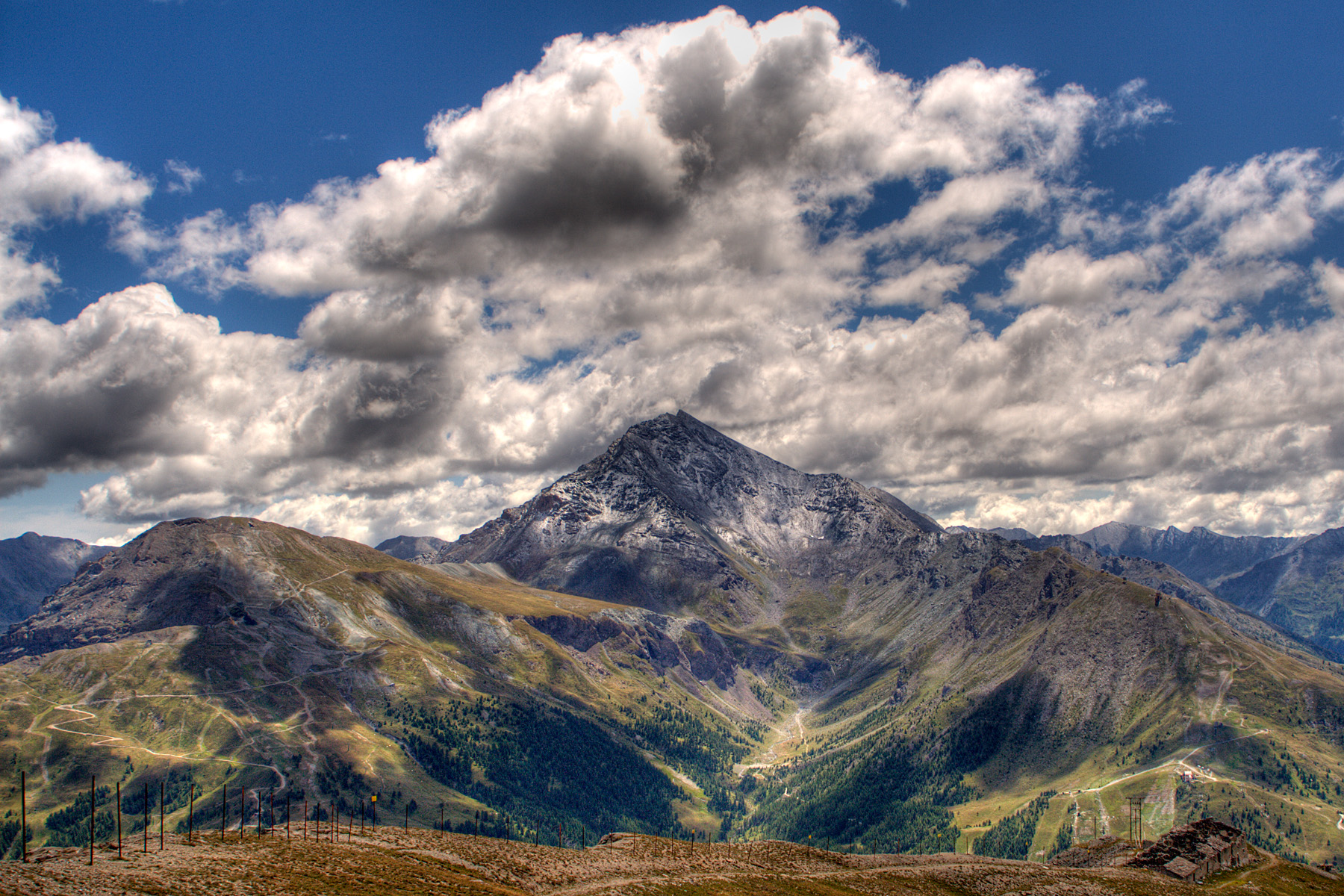
The nineteenth stage, a 55 km (34 mi) individual time trial, began in Pinerolo finished in the mountainous village Sestriere.

While the start on Elba was announced on 9 October, the entire route for the 1993 Giro d'Italia was unveiled by race director Carmine Castellano on 14 November 1992. It contained three time trial events, all of which were individual. There were nine stages containing high mountains, of which five had summit finishes: stage 3, to Sella di Corno; stage 13, to Passo delle Erbe; stage 15, to Lumezzane; stage 17, to Chianale; and stage 20, to Oropa. Another stage with a mountain-top finish was stage 19, which consisted of a climbing time trial to village of Sestriere. The organizers chose to include one rest day. When compared to the previous year's race, the race was 141 km (88 mi) shorter, contained one more rest day, more mountains, and lacked an opening time trial prologue. In addition, this race contained one fewer stage, but two more sets of half stages. For the first time since 1954, when live coverage began, the race was not broadcast by RAI. Instead it was broadcast by Reti Televisive Italiane (RTI) on the Italia 1 channel.

The race began with a split stage on the island of Elba, where Napoleon Bonaparte was exiled briefly in 1814. This was the first time the race began on the island of Elba. The race last visited in 1980 where the race finished in Portoferraio with a sprint finish won by Carmelo Barone. The route contained less time trials than the 1992 route, which Italian rider Claudio Chiappucci had requested. The race's fourteenth stage, which began and ended in Corvara, was named the queen stage for the amount of difficult mountains contained in the stage. Italian rider Franco Chioccioli liked that there were more points of attack in the race and believed that played into Miguel Induráin's hands.

Stage results
Stage	Date	Course	Distance	Type	Winner
1a	23 May	Porto Azzurro to Portoferraio	85 km (53 mi)	Stage with mountain(s)	Moreno Argentin (ITA)
1b	23 May	Portoferraio	9 km (6 mi)	Individual time trial	Maurizio Fondriest (ITA)
2	24 May	Grosseto to Rieti	224 km (139 mi)	Plain stage	Adriano Baffi (ITA)
3	25 May	Rieti to Scanno	153 km (95 mi)	Stage with mountain(s)	Piotr Ugrumov (LAT)
4	26 May	Lago di Scanno to Marcianise	179 km (111 mi)	Plain stage	Fabio Baldato (ITA)
5	27 May	Paestum to Terme Luigiane	210 km (130 mi)	Stage with mountain(s)	Dimitri Konyshev (RUS)
6	28 May	Villafranca Tirrena to Messina	130 km (81 mi)	Plain stage	Guido Bontempi (ITA)
7	29 May	Capo d'Orlando to Agrigento	240 km (149 mi)	Plain stage	Bjarne Riis (DEN)Note: Later admitted doping.
8	30 May	Agrigento to Palermo	140 km (87 mi)	Plain stage	Adriano Baffi (ITA)
	31 May	Rest day			
9	1 June	Montelibretti to Fabriano	216 km (134 mi)	Plain stage	Giorgio Furlan (ITA)
10	2 June	Senigallia to Senigallia	28 km (17 mi)	Individual time trial	Miguel Induráin (ESP)
11	3 June	Senigallia to Dozza	184 km (114 mi)	Plain stage	Fabiano Fontanelli (ITA)
12	4 June	Dozza to Asiago	239 km (149 mi)	Stage with mountain(s)	Dimitri Konyshev (RUS)
13	5 June	Asiago to Corvara	220 km (137 mi)	Stage with mountain(s)	Moreno Argentin (ITA)
14	6 June	Corvara to Corvara	245 km (152 mi)	Stage with mountain(s)	Claudio Chiappucci (ITA)
15	7 June	Corvara to Lumezzane	263 km (163 mi)	Stage with mountain(s)	Davide Cassani (ITA)
16	8 June	Lumezzane to Borgo Val di Taro	181 km (112 mi)	Plain stage	Fabio Baldato (ITA)
17	9 June	Varazze to Pontechianale	223 km (139 mi)	Stage with mountain(s)	Marco Saligari (ITA)
18	10 June	Sampeyre to Fossano	150 km (93 mi)	Plain stage	Adriano Baffi (ITA)
19	11 June	Pinerolo to Sestriere	55 km (34 mi)	Individual time trial	Miguel Induráin (ESP)
20	12 June	Turin to Santuario di Oropa	162 km (101 mi)	Stage with mountain(s)	Massimo Ghirotto (ITA)
21	13 June	Biella to Milan	166 km (103 mi)	Plain stage	Fabio Baldato (ITA)
	Total		3,702 km (2,300 mi)		

== Race overview ==
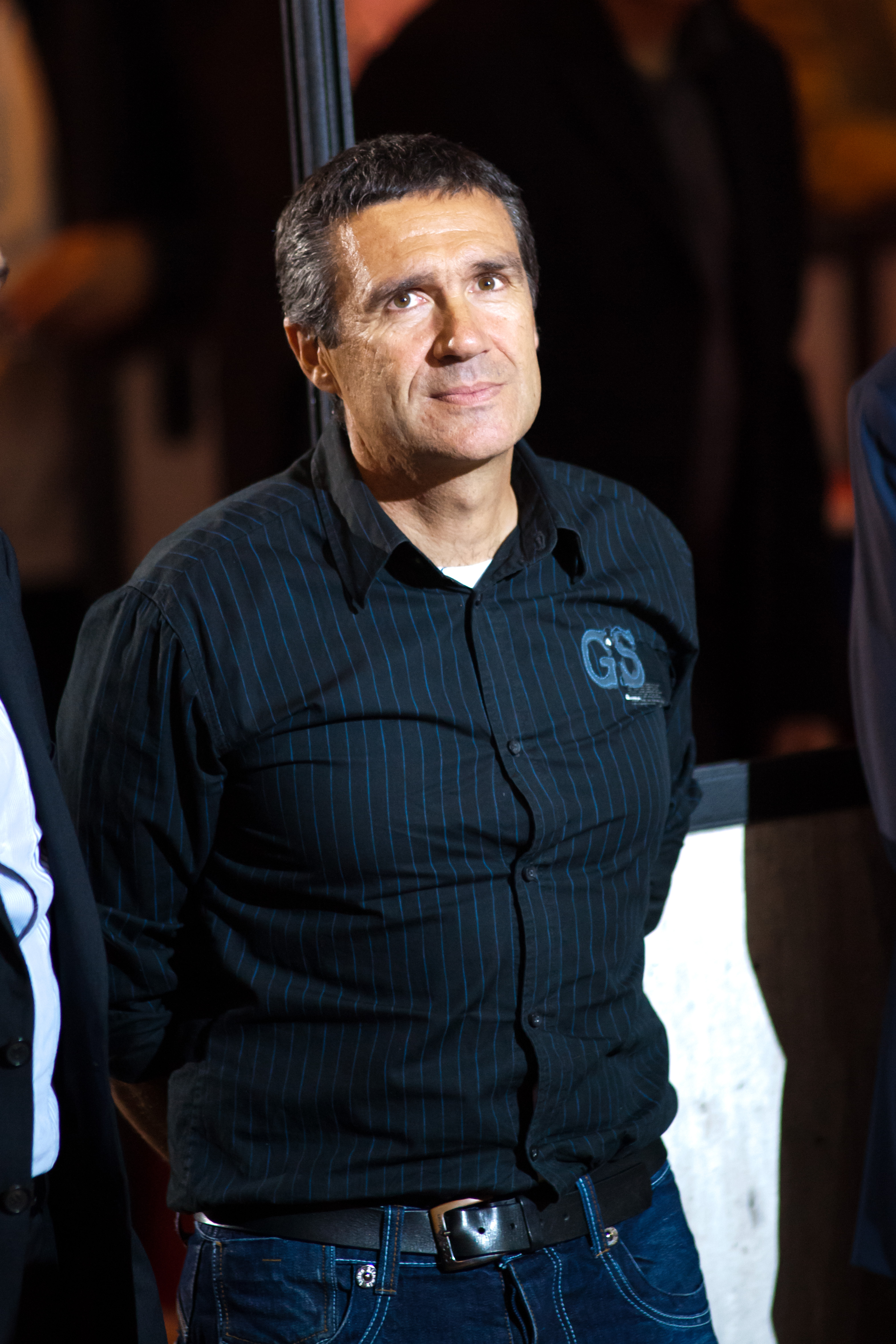
Adriano Baffi won three stages at the 1993 Giro d'Italia.

This edition of the Giro began with a split stage, with the morning leg consisting of an 85 km (53 mi) undulating course and the afternoon stage being a brief 9 km (6 mi) individual time trial. Moreno Argentin won the morning stage after attacking on the final climb of the day to win the leg by thirty-four seconds over the chasing peloton. The afternoon time trial navigated the streets of Portoferraio and was won by Italian Maurizio Fondriest. The Giro's second stage was relatively a flat route that culminated with a sprint finish which was won by Adriano Baffi. The next day saw the first uphill finish to the Selle di Corno. General classification hopeful Piotr Ugrumov positioned himself in the day's breakaway and attacked up the final climb to win the stage and climb to second overall.

The Giro's fourth stage ended with a sprint finish that was won by Italian Fabio Baldato. Jolly Componibili–Club 88's Dimitri Konyshev attacked in the closing kilometers of the fifth stage to take the win. The day of racing concluded with a sprint finish in Messina, which was won by Italian Guido Bontempi. Bjarne Riis (who later admitted doping), Giancarlo Perini, and Michele Coppolillo made up the leading breakaway as the race made its way into the stage seven finish in Agrigento. Riis and Coppolillo pulled away from Perini in the final seconds and Riis subsequently edged out Perini for the victory. The race's eighth leg came down to a sprint finish in Palermo, where Adriano Baffi bested the likes of Endrio Leoni and Fabio Baldato for the win.

The race's ninth stage began in Montelibretti after the race necessitated the transfer to the city during the rest day the day before. The riders were preparing for a sprint finish when Giorgio Furlan and Mario Chiesa attacked with about 5 km (3 mi) of racing to go. The two riders successfully fended off the chasing peloton and went on to the finish in Fabriano, where Furlan managed to beat out Chiesa for the victory. The stage 10 individual time trial began and ended in the city of Senigallia. Miguel Induráin dominated the course and gained over a minute on race leader Moreno Argentin, which allowed him to gain the overall lead of the race and don the race leader's maglia rosa (English: pink jersey).

Stage eleven was marred by rainy weather, which caused many splits in the peloton. Fabio Fontanelli won the stage as a member of the lead group, but tenth-place finisher Bruno Leali gained a six-second race lead by finishing more than three minutes in front of overall leader Miguel Induráin. The Giro's twelfth stage began with a large climb which led to many attacks. Despite the flurry of attacks, the whole peloton eventually made it to the finish line together for a sprint finish that was won by Russian Dimitri Konyshev.

The thirteenth stage saw the first stage that contained mountains from the Dolomites. On the penultimate climb of the day, the Passo di Eores, a lead group broke away that contained the likes of Andrew Hampsten, Ugrumov, and Massimiliano Lelli. The riders stayed out in front over the final climb of the Passi delle Erbe, but were eventually caught by the chase group containing the race leader Leoni. Moreno Argentin edged out Lelli for his second stage victory at the 1993 Giro d'Italia. The next day's route was even more demanding as it contained two ascents of the Passo Pordoi, as well as the climbing of three other highly categorized climbs. Miguel Induráin, Ugrumov, Claudio Chiappucci, and a few other general classification hopefuls were in the leading breakaway as they crossed the Pordoi for the second time. The group rode into the finish in Corvara with race leader Leoni trailing by several minutes. Chiappucci won the sprint to the line, while Indurain regained the overall lead.

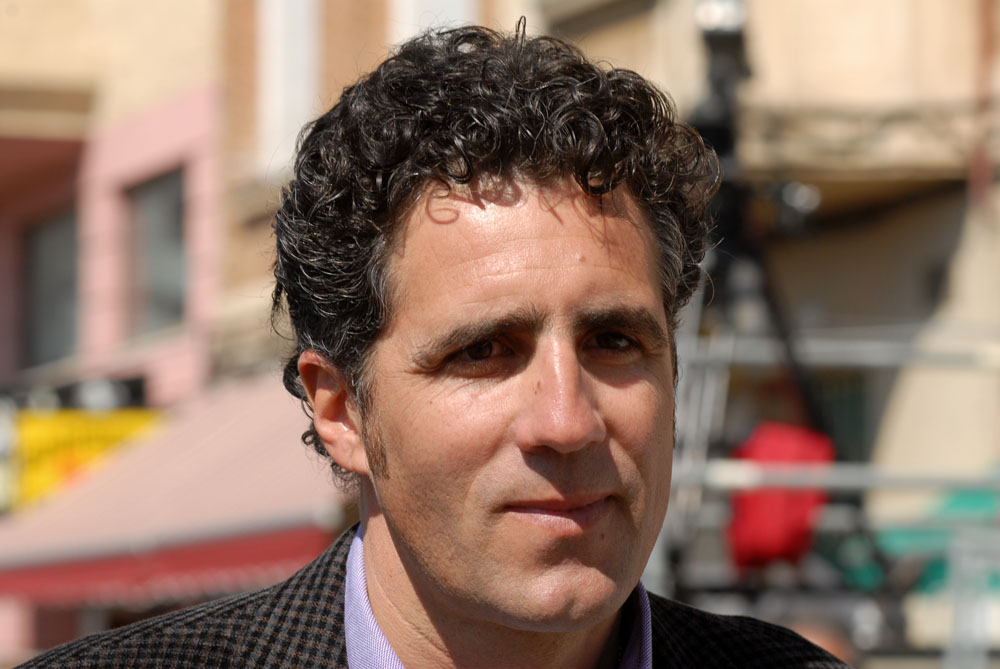
Miguel Induráin won his second consecutive Giro d'Italia in 1993.

Davide Cassani won the fifteenth stage that featured a summit finish to Lumezzane, while the general classification remained largely unaltered. The next day of racing saw a break from the mountains, with a primarily flat course that stretched from Varazze to Pontechianale. The stage ultimately finished with a bunch sprint that was won by Italian Fabio Baldato. The Giro's seventeenth stage concluded with a summit finish to Chianale. Marco Saligari won the stage by over a minute on the second-place finisher Gianluca Bortolami, while the general classification contenders finished together leaving the classification largely unchanged. Stage eighteen was a primarily flat stage that closed with a field sprint. Adriano Baffi won the field sprint and the stage, which was his third stage victory at the Giro that year.

The final time trial in the 1993 Giro d'Italia was 55 km (34 mi) in length and had a summit finish on the famous climb of the Sestriere. Miguel Induráin won the leg and extended his lead over the rest of the field. The penultimate stage featured a 10 km (6 mi) climb to Oropa. Second overall |Piotr Ugrumov attacked multiple times on the final climb of the day to gain time on Indurain; he attacked one last time and Indurain could not match his move. Massimo Ghirotto was the first rider to cross the finish line, with Ugrumov finishing in fifth and Indurain in tenth. Ugrumov gained 40 seconds on Indurain's lead, but it was not good enough to take it away from the Spaniard. The final stage was a primarily flat course that stretched from Biella to Milan. The leg culminated with a bunch sprint that was won by Italian Fabio Baldato. Indurain had won his second consecutive Giro d'Italia.

Success in stages was limited to nine of the competing teams, seven of which achieved multiple stage victories, while five individual riders won multiple stages. The riders that won more than once were Moreno Argentin in stages 1a and 13, Adriano Baffi in stages 2, 8, and 18, Fabio Baldato in stages 4, 16, and 21, Dimitri Konyshev in stages 5 and 12, and Miguel Induráin in stages 10 and 19. Mecair–Ballan won two stages with Moreno Argentin and stage 3 with Piotr Ugrumov. Ariostea won four stages, with Bjarne Riis (who later admitted doping) in stage 7, Giorgio Furlan in stage 9, Davide Cassani in stage 15, and Marco Saligari stage 17. Banesto won two stages with Miguel Induráin. GB–MG Maglificio won three stages with Fabio Baldato. Jolly Componibili–Club 88 won two stages with Dimitri Konyshev. Carrera Jeans–Tassoni won two stages, stage 6 with Guido Bontempi and stage 14 with Claudio Chiappucci. Navigare–Blue Storm also won multiple stages, with Fabiano Fontanelli in stage 11 and three stages with Adriano Baffi.

Lampre–Polti and ZG Mobili each won one stage apiece. Maurizio Fondriest of Lampre-Polti won the stage 1b individual time trial, while ZG Mobili rider Massimo Ghirotto won the mountainous stage 20.

== Classification leadership ==
Five different jerseys were worn during the 1993 Giro d'Italia. The leader of the general classification – calculated by adding the stage finish times of each rider, and allowing time bonuses for the first three finishers on mass-start stages – wore a pink jersey. This classification is the most important of the race, and its winner is considered as the winner of the Giro.

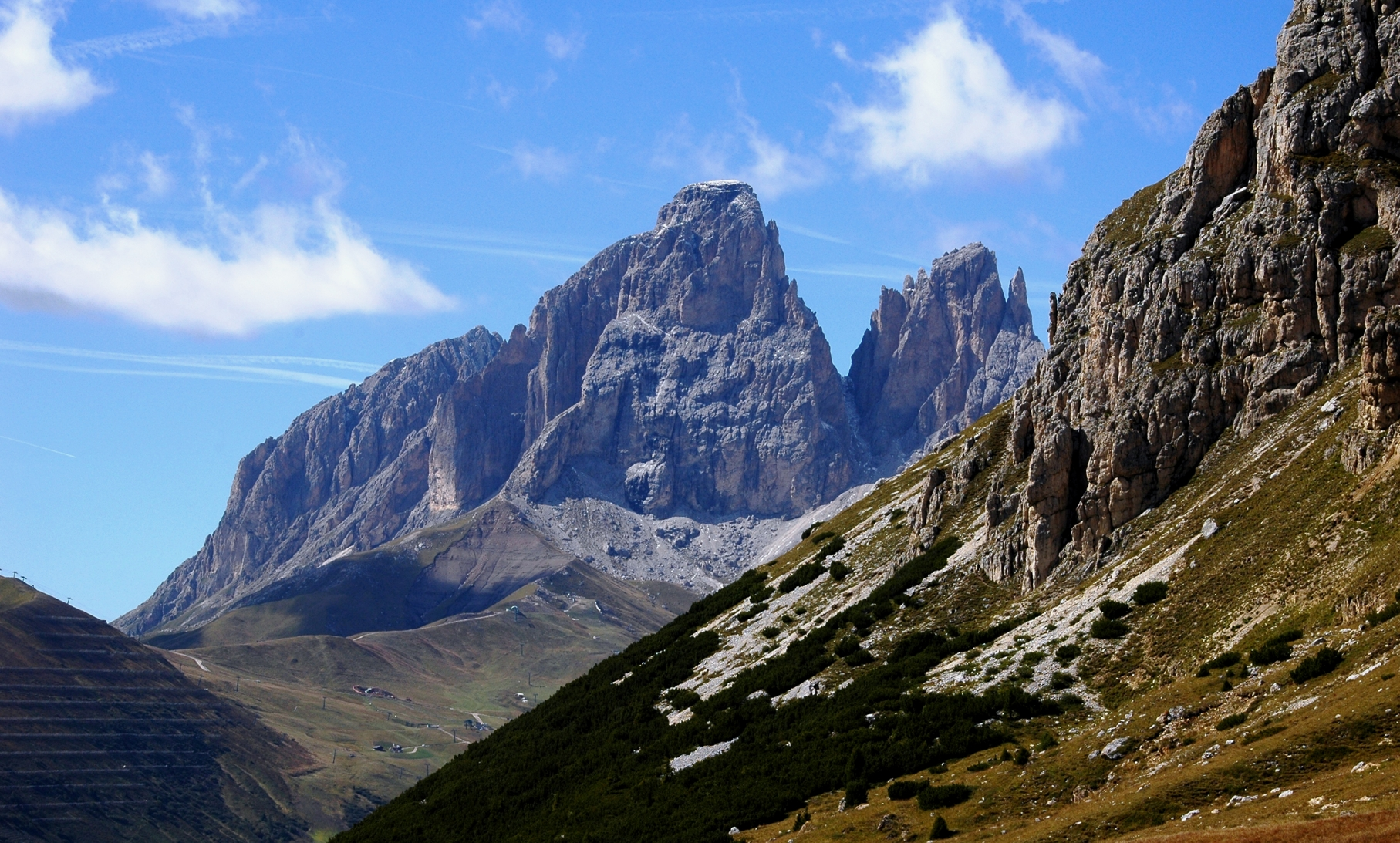
The Pordoi Pass was the Cima Coppi for the 1993 running of the Giro d'Italia.

For the points classification, which awarded a purple (or cyclamen) jersey to its leader, cyclists were given points for finishing a stage in the top 15; additional points could also be won in intermediate sprints. Time bonuses were awarded to the riders who placed in the top three on flat stages, with first, second, and third receiving 12, 8, and 4, seconds bonus, respectively. The green jersey was awarded to the mountains classification leader. In this ranking, points were won by reaching the summit of a climb ahead of other cyclists. Each climb was ranked as either first, second or third category, with more points available for higher category climbs. The Cima Coppi, the race's highest point of elevation, awarded more points than the other first category climbs. The Cima Coppi for this Giro was the Passo Pordoi. The first rider to cross the Pordoi Pass was Spaniard Miguel Induráin. The white jersey was worn by the leader of young rider classification, a ranking decided the same way as the general classification, but only riders born after 1 January 1969 were eligible for it. The intergiro classification was marked by a blue jersey. The calculation for the intergiro is similar to that of the general classification, in each stage there is a midway point that the riders pass through a point and where their time is stopped. As the race goes on, their times compiled and the person with the lowest time is the leader of the intergiro classification and wears the blue jersey. For each intergiro sprint, the first three riders across the line would receive time bonuses of 6, 4, and 2 seconds, respectively. Although no jersey was awarded, there was also a classification for the teams, in which the stage finish times of the best three cyclists per team were added; the leading team was the one with the lowest total time. There was another team classification that awarded points to each team based on their riding's finishing position in every stage. The team with the highest total of points was the leader of the classification.

The rows in the following table correspond to the jerseys awarded after that stage was run.

Classification leadership by stage
Stage	Winner	General classification	Points classification	Mountains classification	Young rider classification	Intergiro classification	Trofeo Fast Team
1a	Moreno Argentin	Moreno Argentin	Moreno Argentin	not awarded	Francesco Casagrande	not awarded	Mecair–Ballan
1b	Maurizio Fondriest	Moreno Argentin	Moreno Argentin	not awarded	Eddy Seigneur	not awarded	Mecair–Ballan
2	Adriano Baffi	Moreno Argentin	Marco Saligari	Francesco Casagrande	Francesco Casagrande	not awarded	Mecair–Ballan
3	Piotr Ugrumov	Moreno Argentin	Marco Saligari	Francesco Casagrande	Francesco Casagrande	Stefano Colagè	Mecair–Ballan
4	Fabio Baldato	Moreno Argentin	Marco Saligari	Francesco Casagrande	Francesco Casagrande	Stefano Colagè	Mecair–Ballan
5	Dimitri Konyshev	Moreno Argentin	Marco Saligari	Francesco Casagrande	Francesco Casagrande	Ján Svorada	Carrera Jeans–Tassoni
6	Guido Bontempi	Moreno Argentin	Adriano Baffi	Francesco Casagrande	Francesco Casagrande	Ján Svorada	Carrera Jeans–Tassoni
7	Bjarne Riis	Moreno Argentin	Adriano Baffi	Francesco Casagrande	Francesco Casagrande	Ján Svorada	Ariostea
8	Adriano Baffi	Moreno Argentin	Adriano Baffi	Mariano Piccoli	Francesco Casagrande	Stefano Colagè	Ariostea
9	Giorgio Furlan	Moreno Argentin	Adriano Baffi	Mariano Piccoli	Francesco Casagrande	Stefano Colagè	Ariostea
10	Miguel Induráin	Miguel Induráin	Adriano Baffi	Mariano Piccoli	Francesco Casagrande	Stefano Colagè	Mecair–Ballan
11	Fabiano Fontanelli	Bruno Leali	Adriano Baffi	Mariano Piccoli	Francesco Casagrande	Stefano Colagè	Lampre–Polti
12	Dimitri Konyshev	Bruno Leali	Adriano Baffi	Mariano Piccoli	Pavel Tonkov	Stefano Colagè	Lampre–Polti
13	Moreno Argentin	Bruno Leali	Adriano Baffi	Mariano Piccoli	Pavel Tonkov	Ján Svorada	Lampre–Polti
14	Claudio Chiappucci	Miguel Induráin	Adriano Baffi	Claudio Chiappucci	Pavel Tonkov	Stefano Colagè	Carrera Jeans–Tassoni
15	Davide Cassani	Miguel Induráin	Adriano Baffi	Mariano Piccoli	Pavel Tonkov	Stefano Colagè	Carrera Jeans–Tassoni
16	Fabio Baldato	Miguel Induráin	Maurizio Fondriest	Mariano Piccoli	Pavel Tonkov	Stefano Colagè	Carrera Jeans–Tassoni
17	Marco Saligari	Miguel Induráin	Maurizio Fondriest	Mariano Piccoli	Pavel Tonkov	Ján Svorada	Carrera Jeans–Tassoni
18	Adriano Baffi	Miguel Induráin	Adriano Baffi	Claudio Chiappucci	Pavel Tonkov	Ján Svorada	Lampre–Polti
19	Miguel Induráin	Miguel Induráin	Adriano Baffi	Claudio Chiappucci	Pavel Tonkov	Ján Svorada	Lampre–Polti
20	Massimo Ghirotto	Miguel Induráin	Adriano Baffi	Claudio Chiappucci	Pavel Tonkov	Ján Svorada	Lampre–Polti
21	Fabio Baldato	Miguel Induráin	Adriano Baffi	Claudio Chiappucci	Pavel Tonkov	Ján Svorada	Lampre–Polti
Final		Miguel Induráin	Adriano Baffi	Claudio Chiappucci	Pavel Tonkov	Ján Svorada	Lampre–Polti

== Final standings ==
Legend
A pink jersey	Denotes the winner of the General classification	A green jersey	Denotes the winner of the Mountains classification
A purple jersey	Denotes the winner of the Points classification	A white jersey	Denotes the winner of the Young rider classification
A blue jersey	Denotes the winner of the Intergiro classification		

=== General classification ===
Final general classification (1–10)
	Rider	Team	Time
1	Miguel Induráin (ESP)	Banesto	98h 09' 44"
2	Piotr Ugrumov (LAT)	Mecair–Ballan	+ 58"
3	Claudio Chiappucci (ITA)	Carrera Jeans–Tassoni	+ 5' 27"
4	Massimiliano Lelli (ITA)	Ariostea	+ 6' 09"
5	Pavel Tonkov (RUS)	Lampre–Polti	+ 7' 11"
6	Moreno Argentin (ITA)	Mecair–Ballan	+ 9' 12"
7	Vladimir Pulnikov (RUS)	Carrera Jeans–Tassoni	+ 11' 30"
8	Maurizio Fondriest (ITA)	Lampre–Polti	+ 12' 53"
9	Stephen Roche (IRL)	Carrera Jeans–Tassoni	+ 13' 31"
10	Zenon Jaskuła (POL)	GB–MG Maglificio	+ 13' 41"

=== Points classification ===
Final points classification (1–5)
	Rider	Team	Points
1	Adriano Baffi (ITA)	Mercatone Uno–Zucchini–Medeghini	228
2	Maurizio Fondriest (ITA)	Lampre–Polti	187
3	Miguel Induráin (ESP)	Banesto	167
4	Fabio Baldato (ITA)	GB–MG Maglificio	164
5	Moreno Argentin (ITA)	Mecair–Ballan	141

=== Mountains classification ===
Final mountains classification (1–5)
	Rider	Team	Points
1	Claudio Chiappucci (ITA)	Carrera Jeans–Tassoni	42
2	Mariano Piccoli (ITA)	Mercatone Uno–Zucchini–Medeghini	40
3	Miguel Induráin (ESP)	Banesto	33
3	Gianluca Bortolami (ITA)	Lampre–Polti	33
5	Piotr Ugrumov (LAT)	Mecair–Ballan	32

=== Young rider classification ===
Final young rider's classification (1–5)
	Rider	Team	Time
1	Pavel Tonkov (RUS)	Lampre–Polti	98h 16' 55"
2	Wladimir Belli (ITA)	Lampre–Polti	+ 11' 35"
3	Francesco Casagrande (ITA)	Mercatone Uno–Zucchini–Medeghini	+ 1h 07' 38"
4	Kai Hundertmarck (GER)	Motorola	+ 1h 15' 15"
5	Vladislav Bobrik (RUS)	Mecair–Ballan	+ 1h 43' 22"

=== Intergiro classification ===
Final intergiro classification (1–5)
	Rider	Team	Time
1	Ján Svorada (CZE)	Lampre–Polti	53h 10' 33"
2	Stefano Colagè (ITA)	ZG Mobili	+ 40"
3	Miguel Induráin (ESP)	Banesto	+ 41"
4	Adriano Baffi (ITA)	Mercatone Uno–Zucchini–Medeghini	+ 1' 10"
5	Piotr Ugrumov (LAT)	Mecair–Ballan	+ 1' 42"

=== Team classification ===
Final team classification (1–5)
	Team	Time
1	Lampre–Polti	294h 50' 53"
2	Carrera Jeans–Tassoni	+ 2' 24"
3	Ariostea	+ 6' 47"
4	Mecair–Ballan	+ 9' 59"
5	Mercatone Uno–Zucchini–Medeghini	+ 22' 56"

=== Team points classification ===
Final team points classification (1–5)
	Team	Points
1	Ariostea	531
2	Mercatone Uno–Zucchini–Medeghini	460
3	Lampre–Polti	444
4	Carrera Jeans–Tassoni	417
5	Mecair–Ballan	383

== Aftermath ==
Miguel Induráin entered the Tour de France in July as the favorite to win the race. He would go on to win the race after taking the lead after the conclusion of the ninth stage. By winning the Tour, he became the first rider to complete the Giro – Tour double in two consecutive years. In April 2018, Indurain was placed into the Giro d'Italia Hall of Fame for his performances during the Giro d'Italia in his career. He was the sixth rider to be inducted.
