= Points classification in the Giro d'Italia =

Cyclamen jersey
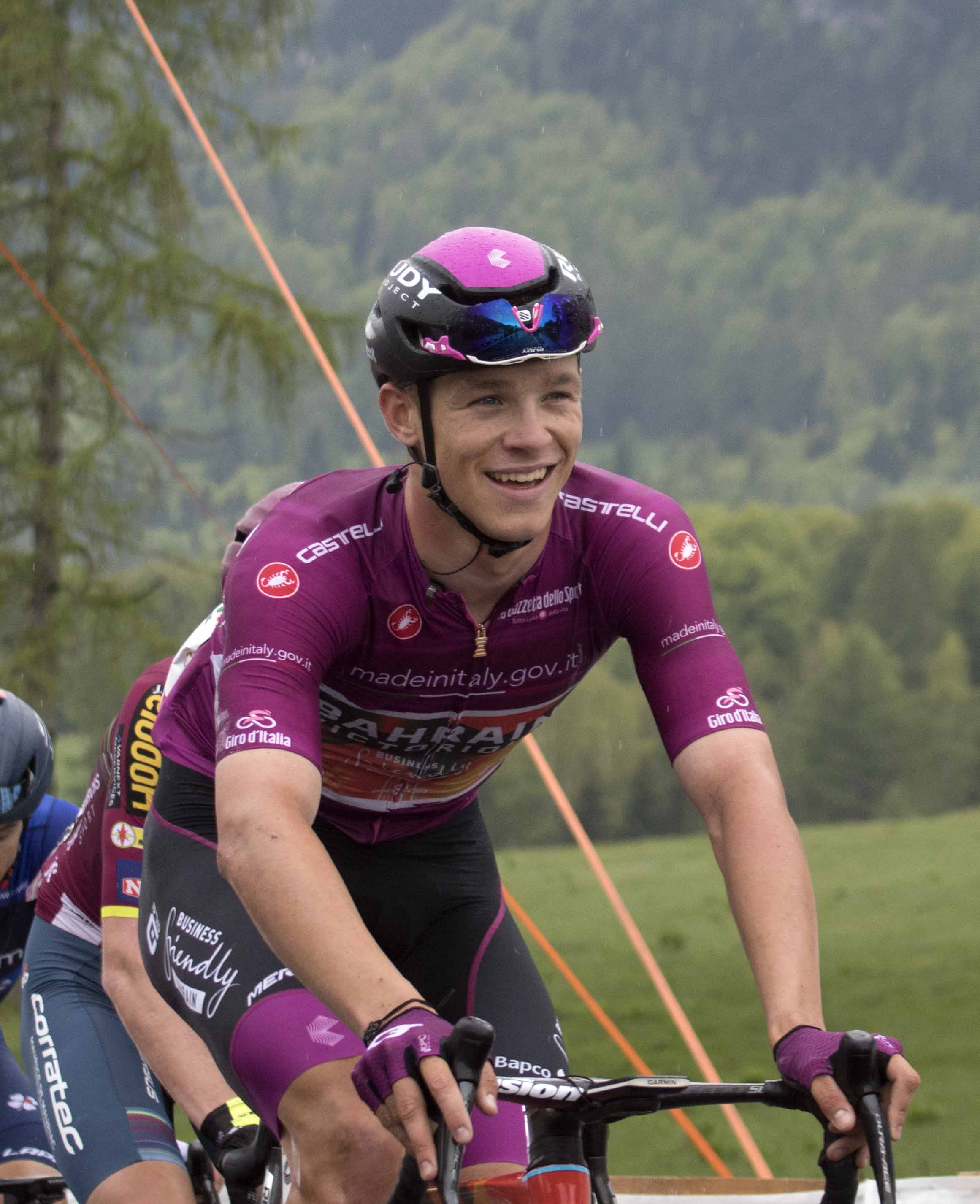
- Jonathan Milan in the maglia ciclamino jersey at the 2023 Giro d'Italia
- Sport: Road cycling
- Competition: Giro d'Italia
- Awarded for: Most consistent finisher
- Local name: Maglia ciclamino (in Italian)

History
- First award: 1966
- Editions: 60 (as of 2025)
- First winner: Gianni Motta (ITA)
- Most wins: Francesco Moser (ITA); Giuseppe Saronni (ITA) (4 wins)
- Most recent: Paul Magnier (FRA)

The points classification in the Giro d'Italia is one of the secondary classifications in the Giro d'Italia. It is determined by points awarded for placings in the daily stages, regardless of time gaps. From 1967 to 1969 the leader wore a red jersey (after the colors of the sponsor Dreher Breweries) but in 1970 it was changed to mauve, and named the maglia ciclamino (from Italian: mauve jersey), the name of the colour in Italian being derived from the alpine flower the cyclamen. The red jersey was re-introduced in 2010, as the maglia rosso passione. However, in April 2017 RCS Sport, the organisers of the Giro, announced that the maglia ciclamino would be revived for the 2017 Giro d'Italia.

== History ==
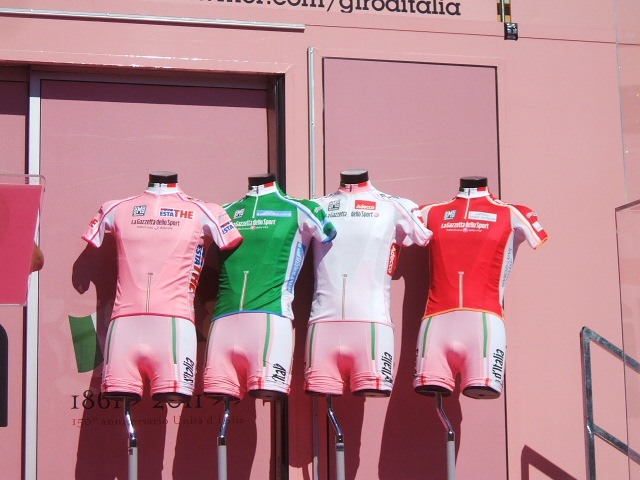
In 2011, a red jersey (right) was used for the leader of the points classification.

The first points classification in the Giro was used in 1958, called Trofeo A. Carli. The first rider in each stage was given 15 points, down to one point for the fifteenth rider. There was no jersey associated, and the next year it was not used again.

The ranking points system was reintroduced in 1966, when there was no associated jersey, while for the two subsequent editions a red jersey was awarded to the leader of the classification. From 1970 to 2009, the jersey was mauve but often referred to as cyclamen.

Points are given to riders who finish among the first in a stage, independent of the time difference. There are also points given to the first cyclists to reach the intermediate sprints. There is an intermediate sprints competition, with names changing from year to year (Intergiro, Expo Milano 2015, Traguardo Volante), which used to give a blue jersey to its leader.

Among the winners of the points classification are Mario Cipollini (three times), Alessandro Petacchi, and in 2006 the future world champion Paolo Bettini.

At the other grand tours, the Tour de France and the Vuelta a España, there are also points classifications; the points classification in the Tour de France rewards a green jersey to its leader, as does the points classification in the Vuelta a España.

== Current rules ==
From 2009 to 2013, the winner of each stage receives 25 points, independent of the type of stage (unlike the better known points classification in the Tour de France, where winning a mountain stage gives fewer points than winning a flat stage). The next cyclist receives 20 points, the next ones 16, 14, 12, 10, 9, 8, 7, 6, 5, 4, 3, 2, until the fifteenth cyclist who receives one point. Every stage (excluding time trials) also has an intermediate sprint. The first to cross that sprint receives 8 points, the next one 6 points, the next ones 4, 3, 2, until the sixth cyclist who receives one point.

In 2014 this was changed so that there are three levels of stages, each with its own point classification scheme. The first level, presumably the flat stages, will award points to 20 riders on a scale from 50 to 1 point. Level two stages will award points to the top 15 riders on a scale of 25 to 1 and level three stages will award points to the top 10 riders on a scale of 15 to 1 point. Points at intermediate sprints will follow a similar scale.

If two or more cyclists have the same number of points, the ranking is determined by the most stage victories, followed by the most intermediate sprint victories, followed by the lowest time in the general classification.

== Winners ==
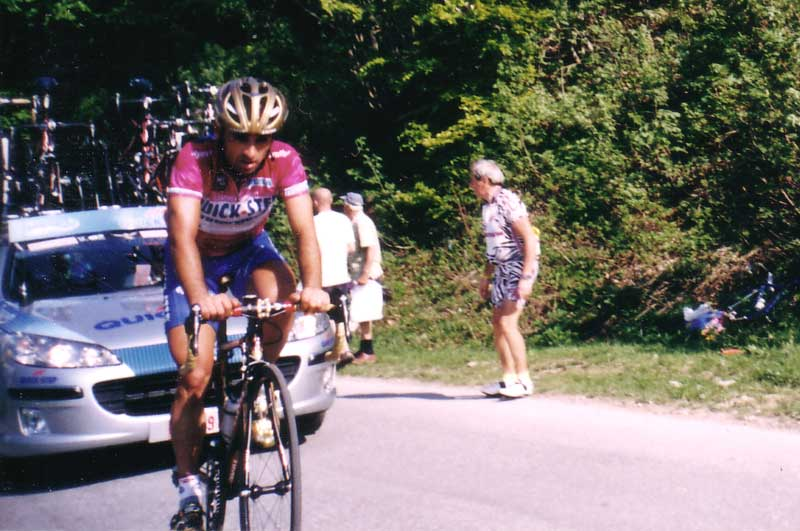
Paolo Bettini in the cyclamen jersey at the 2005 Giro d'Italia

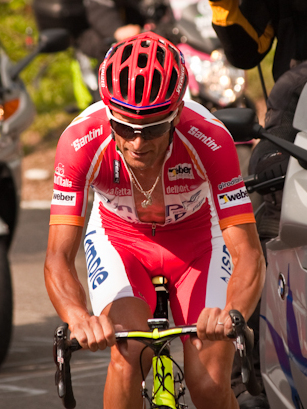
Michele Scarponi, the eventual winner of the points classification in 2011

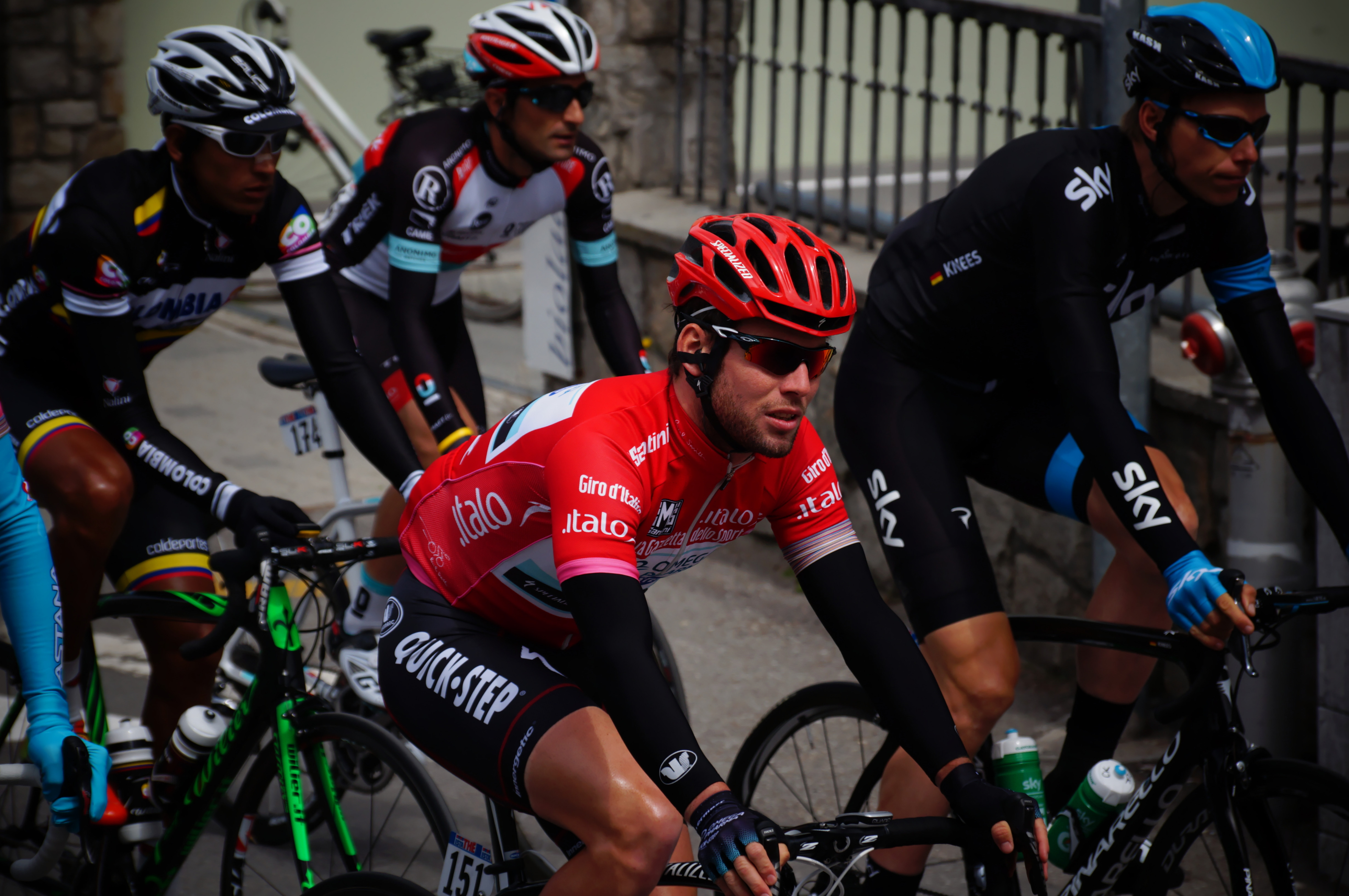
Mark Cavendish wearing the classification's red leader's jersey at the 2013 Giro d'Italia

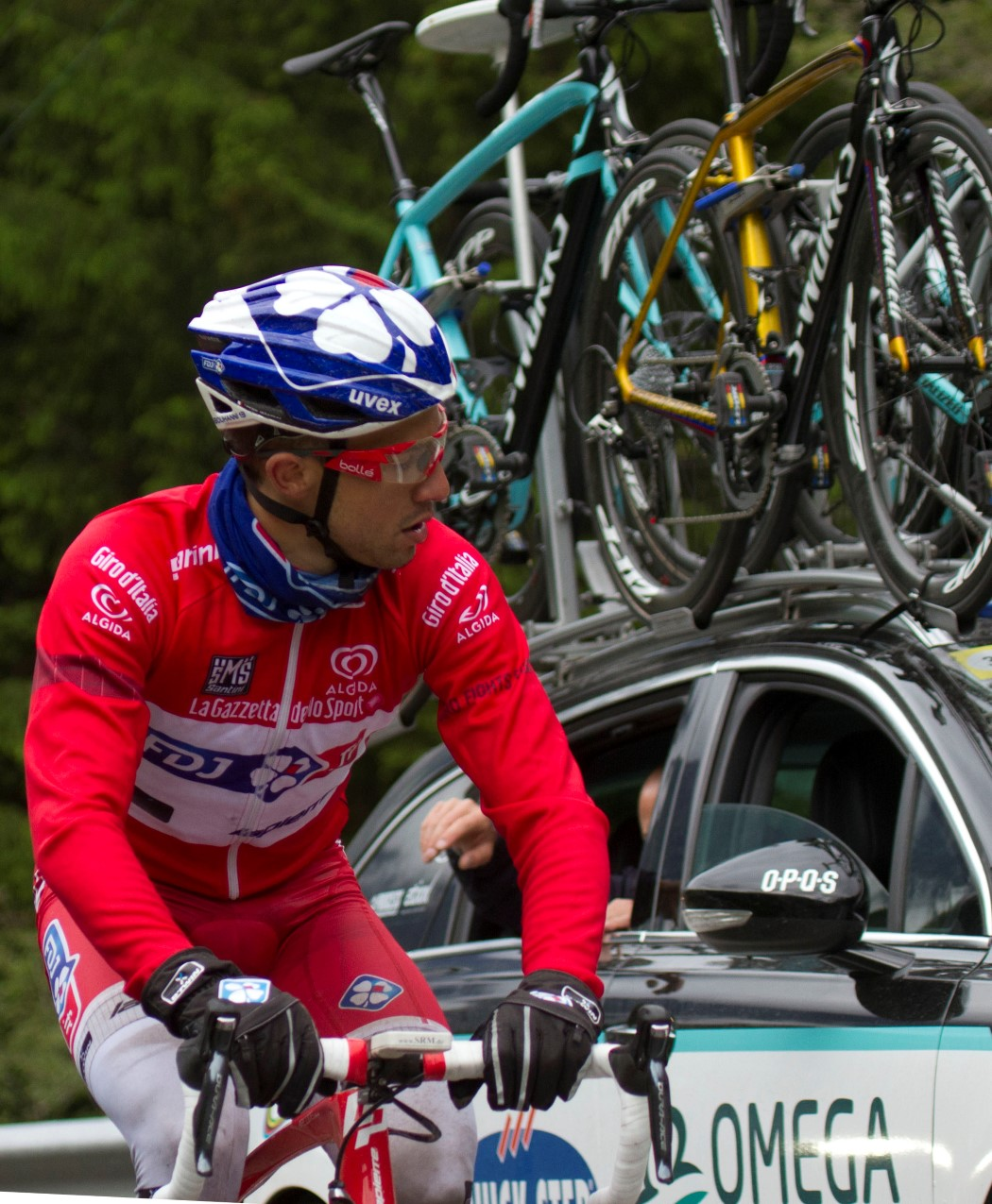
Nacer Bouhanni wearing a red overcoat to denote him as classification leader at the 2014 Giro d'Italia

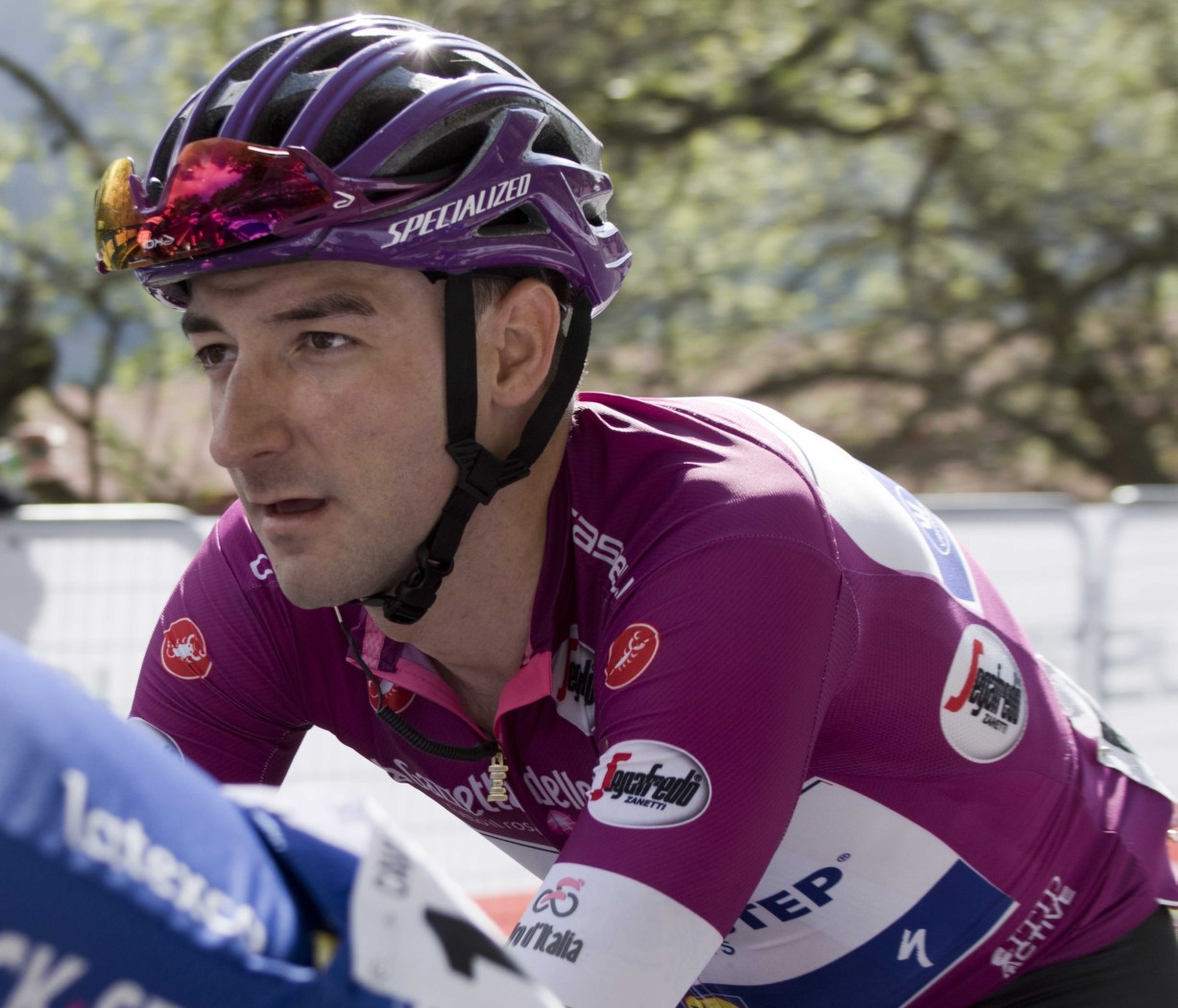
Elia Viviani leading the points classification during the 2018 Giro d'Italia

Key
†	Winner won general classification in the same year
*	Winner won King of the Mountains classification in the same year
‡	Winner won general and King of the Mountains classification in the same year

- The "Year" column refers to the year the competition was held, and wikilinks to the article about that season.
- The "Stages" column refers to the number of stages in the race, counting half stages as two and prologues as one.
- The "Stage wins" column refers to the number of stage wins the winner had during the race.
- The "Margin" column refers to the margin of time or points by which the winner defeated the runner-up.

Giro d'Italia points classification winners
Year	Country	Cyclist	Sponsor/team	Stages	Stage wins	Points	Margin
1966	Italy	Gianni Motta^{†}	Molteni	22	2	490	170
1967	Italy	Dino Zandegù	Salvarani	23	2	200	22
1968	Belgium	Eddy Merckx^{‡}	Faema	23	4	198	60
1969	Italy	Franco Bitossi	Filotex	24	1	182	16
1970	Italy	Franco Bitossi	Filotex	20	3	252	11
1971	Italy	Marino Basso	Ferretti	22	3	181	33
1972	Belgium	Roger De Vlaeminck	Dreher	23	4	264	120
1973	Belgium	Eddy Merckx^{†}	Molteni	21	6	237	21
1974	Belgium	Roger De Vlaeminck	Brooklyn	24	0	265	56
1975	Belgium	Roger De Vlaeminck	Brooklyn	23	6	346	187
1976	Italy	Francesco Moser	Sanson	24	3	272	123
1977	Italy	Francesco Moser	Sanson	27	0	225	40
1978	Italy	Francesco Moser	Sanson	22	4	231	30
1979	Italy	Giuseppe Saronni^{†}	Scic–Bottecchia	20	3	275	1
1980	Italy	Giuseppe Saronni	Gis Gelati	23	7	301	86
1981	Italy	Giuseppe Saronni	Gis Gelati	24	3	215	82
1982	Italy	Francesco Moser	Famcucine	23	2	247	40
1983	Italy	Giuseppe Saronni^{†}	Del Tongo–Colnago	24	3	223	74
1984	Switzerland	Urs Freuler	Atala	23	4	178	6
1985	Netherlands	Johan van der Velde	Vini Ricordi	24	0	195	25
1986	Italy	Guido Bontempi	Carrera Jeans–Vagabond	23	5	167	19
1987	Netherlands	Johan van der Velde	Gis Gelati	24	2	175	4
1988	Netherlands	Johan van der Velde	Gis Gelati	23	0	154	23
1989	Italy	Giovanni Fidanza	Château d'Ax	23	0	172	33
1990	Italy	Gianni Bugno^{†}	Château d'Ax	21	3	195	19
1991	Italy	Claudio Chiappucci	Carrera Jeans–Tassoni	22	0	283	44
1992	Italy	Mario Cipollini	GB–MG Maglificio	22	4	236	28
1993	Italy	Adriano Baffi	Mercatone Uno–Zucchini–Medeghini	21	3	228	41
1994	Uzbekistan	Djamolidine Abdoujaparov	Team Polti–Vaporetto	23	1	202	20
1995	Switzerland	Tony Rominger^{†}	Mapei–GB–Latexco	22	4	205	52
1996	Italy	Fabrizio Guidi	Scrigno–Blue Storm	22	0	235	85
1997	Italy	Mario Cipollini	Scrigno–Gaerne	22	5	202	56
1998	Italy	Mariano Piccoli	Brescialat-Liquigas	23	0	194	36
1999	France	Laurent Jalabert	ONCE	22	3	175	5
2000	Russia	Dimitri Konyshev	Fassa Bortolo	22	1	159	40
2001	Italy	Massimo Strazzer	Mobilvetta Design	22	0	177	19
2002	Italy	Mario Cipollini	Acqua & Sapone	21	6	184	18
2003	Italy	Gilberto Simoni^{†}	Saeco	21	3	154	17
2004	Italy	Alessandro Petacchi	Fassa Bortolo	21	9	250	97
2005	Italy	Paolo Bettini	Quick-Step–Innergetic	21	1	162	8
2006	Italy	Paolo Bettini	Quick-Step–Innergetic	21	1	169	9
2007	—	—^{1}	—	21	—	—	—
2008	Italy	Daniele Bennati	Liquigas	21	3	189	51
2009	Russia	Denis Menchov^{†2}	Rabobank	21	2	144	11
2010	Australia	Cadel Evans	BMC Racing Team	21	1	150	22
2011	Italy	Michele Scarponi^{†3}	Lampre–ISD	21	0	122	6
2012	Spain	Joaquim Rodríguez	Team Katusha	21	2	139	1
2013	United Kingdom	Mark Cavendish	Omega Pharma–Quick-Step	21	5	158	30
2014	France	Nacer Bouhanni	FDJ.fr	21	3	291	26
2015	Italy	Giacomo Nizzolo	Trek Factory Racing	21	0	181	33
2016	Italy	Giacomo Nizzolo	Trek–Segafredo	21	0	185	33
2017	Colombia	Fernando Gaviria	Quick-Step Floors	21	4	325	133
2018	Italy	Elia Viviani	Quick-Step Floors	21	4	341	59
2019	Germany	Pascal Ackermann	Bora–Hansgrohe	21	2	226	13
2020	France	Arnaud Démare	Groupama–FDJ	21	4	233	49
2021	Slovakia	Peter Sagan	Bora–Hansgrohe	21	1	136	18
2022	France	Arnaud Démare	Groupama–FDJ	21	3	254	118
2023	Italy	Jonathan Milan	Team Bahrain Victorious	21	1	217	53
2024	Italy	Jonathan Milan	Lidl–Trek	21	3	352	127
2025	Denmark	Mads Pedersen	Lidl–Trek	21	4	295	110
2026	France	Paul Magnier	Soudal–Quick-Step	21	3	200	47

=== Multiple winners ===
As of 2025, 11 cyclists have won the Points classification in the Giro d'Italia more than once.

Multiple winners of the Giro d'Italia points classification
Cyclist	Total	Years
Francesco Moser (ITA)	4	1976, 1977, 1978, 1982
Giuseppe Saronni (ITA)	4	1979, 1980, 1981, 1983
Roger De Vlaeminck (BEL)	3	1972, 1974, 1975
Johan van der Velde (NED)	3	1985, 1987, 1988
Mario Cipollini (ITA)	3	1992, 1997, 2002
Franco Bitossi (ITA)	2	1969, 1970
Eddy Merckx (BEL)	2	1968, 1973
Paolo Bettini (ITA)	2	2005, 2006
Giacomo Nizzolo (ITA)	2	2015, 2016
Arnaud Démare (FRA)	2	2020, 2022
Jonathan Milan (ITA)	2	2023, 2024

=== By nationality ===
Riders from fourteen countries have won the Points classification in the Giro d'Italia.

Giro d'Italia points classification winners by nationality
Country	No. of winning cyclists	No. of wins
Italy	24	35
France	4	5
Belgium	2	5
Netherlands	1	3
Switzerland	2	2
Russia	2	2
Uzbekistan	1	1
Australia	1	1
Spain	1	1
United Kingdom	1	1
Colombia	1	1
Germany	1	1
Slovakia	1	1
Denmark	1	1

=== Notes ===
1. The original winner was Alessandro Petacchi, who was stripped of his results from the 2007 Giro after a positive test for elevated levels of salbutamol.
2. Awarded after the disqualification (due to doping) of apparent winner Danilo Di Luca
3. Awarded after the disqualification (due to doping) of apparent winner Alberto Contador

== Days in leader's jersey ==
after the end of 2025 Giro d'Italia

Rider	Days	Stages
Giuseppe Saronni (ITA)	74	76
Roger De Vlaeminck (BEL)	67	71
Mario Cipollini (ITA)	58	58
Francesco Moser (ITA)	52	54
Eddy Merckx (BEL)	51	52
Alessandro Petacchi (ITA)	48	48
Johan van der Velde (NED)	41	43
Arnaud Démare (FRA)	40	40
Jonathan Milan (ITA)	38	38
Elia Viviani (ITA)	33	33
Franco Bitossi (ITA)	29	30
Mark Cavendish (GBR)	23	23
Urs Freuler (SUI)	21	21
Mads Pedersen (DEN)	21	21
Marino Basso (ITA)	19	20
Miguel Poblet (ESP)	19	19

=== Riders leading all stages of an edition ===
Mario Cipollini (ITA) 1997 (22 stages)

Mads Pedersen (DEN) 2025 (21 stages)

== Azzurri d'Italia classification ==
The Azzurri d'Italia classification (English: 'Azure or Sky Blue Italy) is an award in the Giro d'Italia in which points are awarded to the top three stage finishers (4, 2 and 1 point). It is similar to the standard points classification for which the leader and final winner are awarded the red jersey but no jersey is awarded for this classification, only a cash prize to the overall winner. For the 2007 Giro d'Italia, the Azzurri d'Italia winner won € 5,000.

=== Past winners ===
Year	Country	Rider	Team
2001	Italy	Mario Cipollini	Saeco
2002	Italy	Mario Cipollini	Acqua & Sapone–Cantina Tollo
2003	Italy	Gilberto Simoni	Saeco
2004	Italy	Alessandro Petacchi	Fassa Bortolo
2005	Italy	Alessandro Petacchi	Fassa Bortolo
2006	Italy	Ivan Basso	Team CSC
2007	No winner (Note: The original winner was Alessandro Petacchi, who was stripped of his results from the 2007 Giro after a positive test for elevated levels of salbutamol.)		
2008	Italy	Daniele Bennati	Liquigas
2009	Italy	Stefano Garzelli	Acqua & Sapone–Caffè Mokambo
2010	Italy	Vincenzo Nibali	Liquigas–Doimo
2011	Venezuela	José Rujano (Note: Awarded after the disqualification (due to doping) of apparent winner Alberto Contador.)	Androni Giocattoli
2012	Great Britain	Mark Cavendish	Team Sky
2013	Great Britain	Mark Cavendish	Omega Pharma–Quick-Step
2014	France	Nacer Bouhanni	FDJ.fr
2015	Spain	Mikel Landa	Astana
