= 1991 Milan–San Remo =

Race details
- Dates: 23 March 1991
- Stages: 1
- Distance: 294 km (183 mi)
- Winning time: 6h 56' 36"

Results
	Winner	Claudio Chiappucci (ITA)	(Carrera Jeans–Tassoni)
	Second	Rolf Sørensen (DEN)	(Ariostea)
	Third	Eric Vanderaerden (BEL)	(Buckler–Colnago–Decca)

The 1991 Milan–San Remo was the 82nd edition of the Milan–San Remo cycle race and was held on 23 March 1991. The race started in Milan and finished in San Remo. The race was won by Claudio Chiappucci of the Carrera team.

== General classification ==
Final general classification

Rank	Rider	Team	Time
1	Claudio Chiappucci (ITA)	Carrera Jeans–Tassoni	6h 56' 36"
2	Rolf Sørensen (DEN)	Ariostea	+ 45"
3	Eric Vanderaerden (BEL)	Buckler–Colnago–Decca	+ 57"
4	Djamolidine Abdoujaparov (URS)	Carrera Jeans–Tassoni	+ 57"
5	Eddy Planckaert (BEL)	Panasonic–Sportlife	+ 57"
6	Gérard Rué (FRA)	Helvetia–La Suisse	+ 57"
7	Phil Anderson (AUS)	Motorola	+ 57"
8	Uwe Raab (GER)	PDM–Concorde–Ultima	+ 57"
9	Johnny Weltz (DEN)	ONCE	+ 57"
10	Andreas Kappes (GER)	Histor–Sigma	+ 57"
