= Guido Bontempi =

Italian cyclist

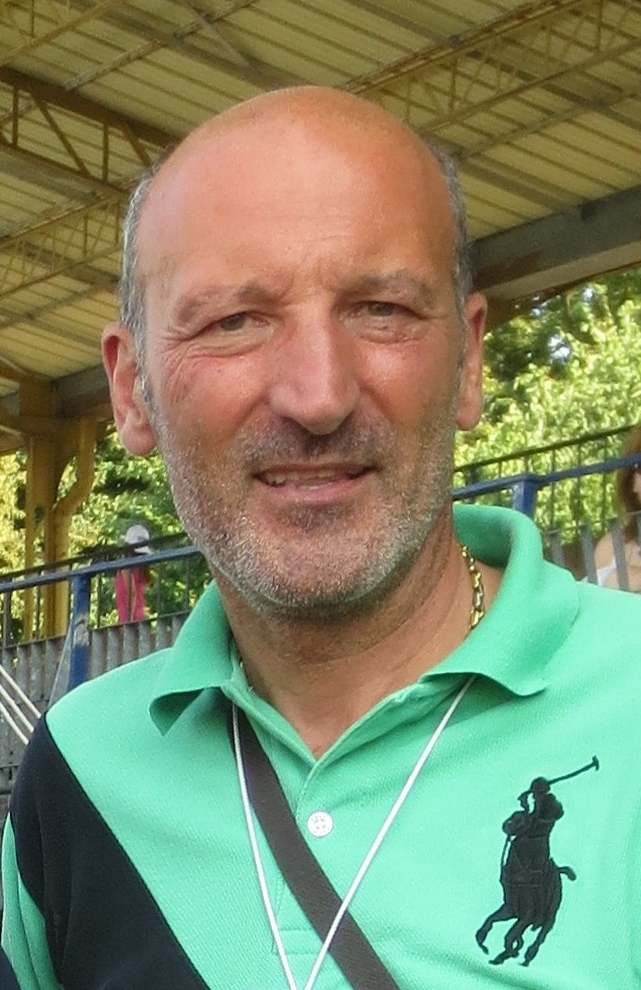

Personal information
- Full name: Guido Bontempi
- Born: 12 January 1960 (age 66) Gussago, Italy

Cycling career
- Sport: Cycling
- Disciplines: Road; Track
- Role: Rider
- Rider type: Sprinter

Professional teams
- 1981–1993: Inoxpran
- 1994–1995: Gewiss–Ballan

Major wins
- Grand Tours Tour de France 6 individual stages (1986, 1988, 1990, 1992) Giro d'Italia Points classification (1986) 16 individual stages (1981-1993) Vuelta a España 4 individual stages (1981, 1991) One-Day Races and Classics Gent–Wevelgem (1984, 1986) E3 Prijs Vlaanderen (1988) Giro del Piemonte (1983) Tre Valli Varesine (1986, 1991) Paris-Brussels (1986)
Medal record
Men's track cycling
Representing Italy
World Championships
Silver medal – second place	1981 Brno	Keirin
Silver medal – second place	1983 Zürich	Points race

Guido Bontempi (born 12 January 1960 in Gussago) is an Italian former road bicycle racer. Bontempi's career highlights include winning the spring classic Gent–Wevelgem two times (1984 and 1986) and a total of 16 stages in the Giro d'Italia throughout his career. He also won six stages in the Tour de France and four stages in the Vuelta a España. In the 1988 Tour de France, he won the prologue, allowing him to wear the yellow jersey in the first stage. He also won the points classification in the 1986 Giro d'Italia and wore the pink jersey as leader of the general classification for one stage in the 1981 Giro d'Italia. He also competed in the 1000m time trial and team pursuit events at the 1980 Summer Olympics.

== Major results ==
1981
Vuelta a España

1st Stages 1 & 3

1st Stage 1a Giro d'Italia
1982
1st Giro del Friuli
1st Stage 14 Giro d'Italia
1983
1st Giro del Piemonte
Giro d'Italia

1st Stages 2 & 8

Tour of the Basque Country

1st Stages 1 & 5

1st Stage 1 Tirreno–Adriatico
1984
1st Gent–Wevelgem
1st Stage 21 Giro d'Italia
1st Prologue Tirreno–Adriatico
1985
1st Stage 2 Giro del Trentino
1st Stage 5 Danmark Rundt
1986
1st Gent–Wevelgem
1st Giro della Provincia di Reggio Calabria
1st Paris–Brussels
1st Tre Valli Varesine
Giro d'Italia

1st Points classification
1st Stages 7, 10, 11, 17 & 20

Tour de France

1st Stages 6, 22 & 23

1987
1st Coppa Bernocchi
1st Giro del Friuli
1st Stage 12 Giro d'Italia
1988
1st E3 Prijs Vlaanderen
1st Coppa Bernocchi
1st Giro del Friuli
Giro d'Italia

1st Stages 2 & 5

1st Prologue Tour de France
1990
Vuelta a Valencia

1st Stages 1a & 2

1st Stage 19 Tour de France
1st Stage 1b Setmana Catalana de Ciclisme
1991
1st Tre Valli Varesine
Vuelta a España

1st Stages 10 & 15

1st Stage 2 Tour de Luxembourg
1992
Giro d'Italia

1st Stages 7 & 9

1st Stage 5 Tour de France
1993
1st Stage 6 Giro d'Italia
1st Stage 1 Giro del Trentino
1st Stage 3 Vuelta a Valencia
