= 1984 Gent–Wevelgem =

Race details
- Dates: 4 April 1984
- Stages: 1
- Distance: 255 km (158 mi)
- Winning time: 6h 09' 00"

Results
	Winner	Guido Bontempi (ITA)	(Carrera–Inoxpran)
	Second	Eric Vanderaerden (BEL)	(Panasonic–Raleigh)
	Third	Pierino Gavazzi (ITA)	(Atala)

The 1984 Gent–Wevelgem was the 46th edition of the Belgian Gent–Wevelgem cycle race and was held on 4 April 1984. The race started in Ghent and finished in Wevelgem. The race was won by Guido Bontempi of the Carrera team.

== General classification ==
Final general classification

Rank	Rider	Team	Time
1	Guido Bontempi (ITA)	Carrera–Inoxpran	6h 09' 00"
2	Eric Vanderaerden (BEL)	Panasonic–Raleigh	+ 0"
3	Pierino Gavazzi (ITA)	Atala	+ 0"
4	Francis Castaing (FRA)	Peugeot–Shell–Michelin	+ 0"
5	Ad Wijnands (NED)	Kwantum–Decosol–Yoko	+ 0"
6	Eddy Planckaert (BEL)	Panasonic–Raleigh	+ 0"
7	Stefan Mutter (SUI)	Cilo–Aufina–Crans–Montana	+ 0"
8	Rudy Dhaenens (BEL)	Splendor–Mondial Moquettes–Marc	+ 0"
9	Greg LeMond (USA)	Renault–Elf	+ 0"
10	Pol Verschuere (BEL)	Europ Decor–Boule d'Or	+ 0"
