= 1986 Gent–Wevelgem =

Race details
- Dates: 19 April 1986
- Stages: 1
- Distance: 250 km (160 mi)
- Winning time: 5h 35' 00"

Results
	Winner	Guido Bontempi (ITA)	(Carrera–Inoxpran)
	Second	Twan Poels (NED)	(Kwantum–Decosol–Yoko)
	Third	Jean-Marie Wampers (BEL)	(Hitachi–Marc)

The 1986 Gent–Wevelgem was the 48th edition of the Belgian Gent–Wevelgem cycle race and was held on 19 April 1986. The race started in Ghent and finished in Wevelgem. The race was won by Guido Bontempi of the Carrera–Inoxpran team.

== General classification ==
Final general classification

Rank	Rider	Team	Time
1	Guido Bontempi (ITA)	Carrera–Inoxpran	5h 35' 00"
2	Twan Poels (NED)	Kwantum–Decosol–Yoko	+ 0"
3	Jean-Marie Wampers (BEL)	Hitachi–Marc	+ 0"
4	Heinz Imboden (SUI)	Cilo–Aufina–Gemeaz Cusin	+ 0"
5	Steve Bauer (CAN)	La Vie Claire	+ 10"
6	Ludo Peeters (BEL)	Kwantum–Decosol–Yoko	+ 10"
7	Rudy Dhaenens (BEL)	Hitachi–Marc	+ 10"
8	Kim Andersen (DEN)	La Vie Claire	+ 15"
9	Eddy Planckaert (BEL)	Panasonic–Merckx–Agu	+ 18"
10	Adri van der Poel (NED)	Kwantum–Decosol–Yoko	+ 18"
