= 1991 Gent–Wevelgem =

Race details
- Dates: 10 April 1991
- Stages: 1
- Distance: 210 km (130 mi)
- Winning time: 5h 16' 38"

Results
	Winner	Djamolidine Abdoujaparov (URS)	(Carrera Jeans–Tassoni)
	Second	Mario Cipollini (ITA)	(Del Tongo–MG Boys)
	Third	Olaf Ludwig (GER)	(Panasonic–Sportlife)

The 1991 Gent–Wevelgem was the 53rd edition of the Belgian Gent–Wevelgem cycle race and was held on 10 April 1991. The race started in Ghent and finished in Wevelgem. The race was won by Djamolidine Abdoujaparov of the Carrera team.

== General classification ==
Final general classification

Rank	Rider	Team	Time
1	Djamolidine Abdoujaparov (URS)	Carrera Jeans–Tassoni	5h 16' 38"
2	Mario Cipollini (ITA)	Del Tongo–MG Boys	+ 0"
3	Olaf Ludwig (GER)	Panasonic–Sportlife	+ 0"
4	Eric Vanderaerden (BEL)	Buckler–Colnago–Decca	+ 0"
5	Kurt Onclin (BEL)	Tulip Computers	+ 0"
6	Marc Sergeant (BEL)	Panasonic–Sportlife	+ 0"
7	Jean-Claude Colotti (FRA)	Tonton Tapis–GB	+ 0"
8	Johan Museeuw (BEL)	Lotto	+ 0"
9	Didier Priem (BEL)	Tonton Tapis–GB	+ 0"
10	Allan Peiper (AUS)	Tulip Computers	+ 0"
