= Carrera (cycling team) =

Italian road bicycle racing team

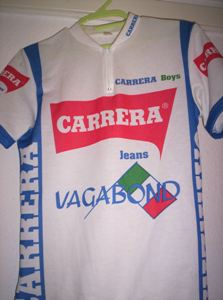
- The 1987 Carrera Jeans–Vagabond jersey

Team information
- UCI code: CAR
- Registered: Italy
- Founded: 1984
- Disbanded: 1996
- Discipline: Road
- Status: Retired

Key personnel
- General manager: Davide Boifava

Team name history
- 1979–1983 1984–1985 1986–1990 1991 1992 1993–1996: Inoxpran; Carrera–Inoxpran; Carrera Jeans–Vagabond; Carrera Jeans–Tassoni; Carrera Jeans–Vagabond; Carrera Jeans–Tassoni

Carrera was an Italian-based road bicycle racing team active from 1984 to 1996, named after sponsoring Italian jeans manufacturer Carrera. The team was successful in the Giro d'Italia and the Tour de France with three overall wins and several wins in the Points classification and Mountain Classifications.

== History ==
=== Inoxpran ===
The Inoxpran cycling team began in 1979. The Inoxpran team achieved success with Italian Giovanni Battaglin who won in the period of a month and a half in 1981 two Grand Tours in with the 1981 Giro d'Italia and the 1981 Vuelta a España. Battaglin was the second rider in history to achieve this Giro-Vuelta double after Eddy Merckx who achieved the double in 1973. Roberto Visentini had been the Inoxpran team leader in 1983 when he finished second overall in the 1983 Giro d'Italia.

=== Carrera ===
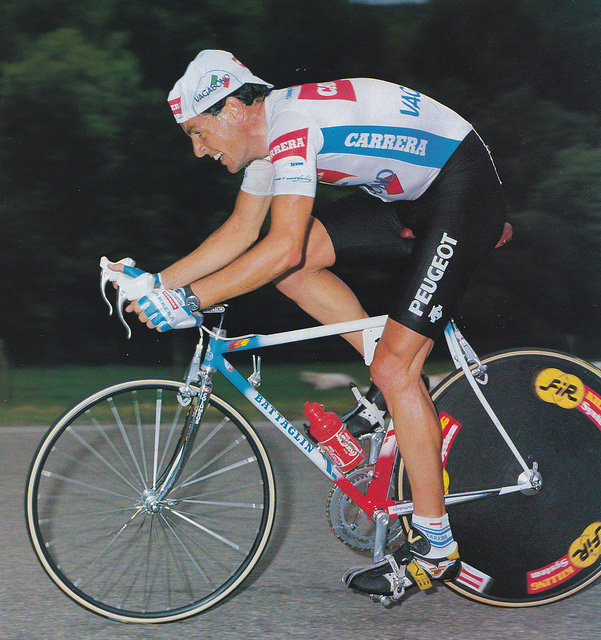
Stephen Roche riding for Carrera Jeans–Vagabond at the 1987 Giro d'Italia, a race he won

Carrera Jeans became the title sponsor in 1984 and Visentini finally won the Giro d'Italia in 1986. At the end of 1985 the team had signed Stephen Roche to perform for the team at the Tour de France. Roche had a poor season in 1986 but bounced back in 1987. When Roche won the Tour de Romandie just ahead of the 1987 Giro d'Italia, he became the number one favourite for the maglia rosa and wanted to be the team leader during the race, something that Visentini, an Italian with an Italian team and the defending champion of the event expected to be alone. This inter team rivalry came to a head during the race when Roche attacked Visentini. Roche went on to win the race and then the 1987 Tour de France. This was the only time that the Carrera team would win the Tour and it would be the last time the team won the Giro d'Italia. Roche left the team at the end of 1987 but returned to the team in 1992 for his last two seasons.

In 1989, Carrera manager Davide Boifava together with Luciano Bracchi, Francesco Boifava, Tacchella's family and Valentino Compagnoni founded Carrera Podium, a manufacturer of cycles. From 1990 on, the team rode on these Carrera bikes.

During this time, Claudio Chiappucci rose from being the domestique of Visentini and Roche during the 1987 Giro to the team leader. Chiappucci wore the yellow jersey as leader of the general classification during the 1990 Tour de France finishing the race second overall and famously battled Miguel Indurain in the 1992 Tour de France. Chiappucci won the Great Italian Classic Milan–San Remo for the team in 1991.

During the latter years of the team, a young Marco Pantani emerged as a contender for the Grand Tours during the 1994 season finishing on the podium in both the 1994 Giro d'Italia and the 1994 Tour de France. Pantani's success was hindered during the last two years of the Carrera team's existence. When Carrera stopped sponsoring a cycling team at the end of 1996, it was reported that manager Davide Boifava would be building a team around Marco Pantani with Mercatone Uno as the main sponsor. However Davide Cassani became the manager of that new team, taking with him as directeur sportifs Giuseppe Martinelli and Alessandro Giannelli and ten of the riders from Carrera including Pantani forming the Mercatone Uno team with whom Pantani would win the 1998 Tour de France and the 1998 Giro d'Italia. At the same time, Boifava started a team with Asics as the main sponsor and took with him five riders from Carrera including Claudio Chiappucci.

=== Doping ===
The team doctor of the Carrera cycling team, Dr. Giovanni Grazzi, worked with Professor Francesco Conconi at the University of Ferrara in 1993. It was reported in the Rome-based newspaper, La Republica, in January 2000 that Conconi was involved with administering EPO to riders on the Carrera team. In March 2000 the Italian Judge Franca Oliva published a report detailing the conclusions of an investigation into a number of sports doctors including Professor Conconi. This official judicial investigation concluded that the riders of the Carrera team were administered EPO in 1993. The riders included Stephen Roche, Claudio Chiappucci, Guido Bontempi, Rolf Sørensen, Mario Chiesa, Massimo Ghirotto and Fabio Roscioli.

Files seized as part of the judicial investigation allegedly detail a number of aliases for former Tour de France, Giro d'Italia winner and World Champion Stephen Roche including Rocchi, Rossi, Rocca, Roncati, Righi and Rossini. In 1997, Claudio Chiappucci told prosecutor Vincenzo Scolastico that he had been using EPO since 1993, but later he recalled that statement.

== Major wins ==
1979
Stage 7 Tour de Suisse, Giovanni Battaglin
Mountains classification Tour de France, Giovanni Battaglin
Coppa Placci, Giovanni Battaglin
Coppa Agostoni, Giovanni Battaglin

1980
Zambana di Trento, Giovanni Battaglin
Stage 5 Giro d'Italia, Jørgen Marcussen
Stage 18 Giro d'Italia, Giovanni Battaglin
Coppa Placci, Giovanni Battaglin
Chignolo Po, Giovanni Battaglin
Milano–Torino, Giovanni Battaglin
Quistello Criterium, Alfredo Chinetti

1981
Stages 1 & 3 Vuelta a España, Guido Bontempi
Stage 2 Vuelta a España, Alfredo Chinetti
Stage 8b Vuelta a España, Giovanni Battaglin
Overall Giro d'Italia, Giovanni Battaglin

Stage 1a, Guido Bontempi
Stage 19, Giovanni Battaglin

1982
Stage 6 Settimana Ciclistica Bergamasca, Bruno Leali
Stage 15 Giro d'Italia, Guido Bontempi
Coppa Placci, Alfredo Chinetti

1983
Stages 2 & 8 Giro d'Italia, Guido Bontempi
Stage 22 Giro d'Italia, Roberto Visentini
Giro del Piemonte, Guido Bontempi

1984
Gent–Wevelgem, Guido Bontempi
Prologue Giro del Trentino, Roberto Visentini
Stage 13 Giro d'Italia, Roberto Visentini
Stage 18 Giro d'Italia, Bruno Leali
Stage 21 Giro d'Italia, Guido Bontempi
Stage 1 Ruota d'Oro, Guido Bontempi
Stage 2 Ruota d'Oro, Bruno Leali

1985
Mountains classification Tour de Romandie, Beat Breu
Overall Grabs–Voralp, Beat Breu

Stage 1, Beat Breu

Stage 9a (TTT) Tour de Suisse (Note: The riders on the squad were Massimo Ghirotto, Claudio Chiappucci, Urs Zimmermann, Francesco Rossignoli, Giancarlo Perini, Beat Breu, Jørgen Pedersen, Fabio Bordonali)
Stage 10 Tour de France, Jørgen Pedersen
Martigny–Mauvoisin, Beat Breu
Stage 5 Tour of Denmark, Guido Bontempi
Giro del Lazio, Bruno Leali
Switzerland National Hill Climb Championships, Beat Breu
Oreno di Vimercate Cyclo-cross, Claudio Chiappucci

1986
Stage 6 Paris–Nice, Jørgen Pedersen
Overall Critérium International, Urs Zimmermann

Stage 2, Urs Zimmermann

Giro della Provincia di Reggio Calabria, Guido Bontempi
Gent–Wevelgem, Guido Bontempi

Stage 6 Giro d'Italia, Roberto Visentini

Overall Critérium du Dauphiné, Urs Zimmermann

Stage 5, Erich Mächler

Overall Giro d'Italia, Roberto Visentini

Points classification, Guido Bontempi
Stages 7, 10, 11, 17 & 20, Guido Bontempi

Stage 10 Tour de Suisse, Massimo Ghirotto
Stages 6, 22 & 23 Tour de France, Guido Bontempi
Stage 21 Tour de France, Erich Mächler
Coppa Placci, Guido Bontempi
Gouden Pijl, Guido Bontempi
Paris–Brussels, Guido Bontempi

1987
Overall Volta a la Comunitat Valenciana, Stephen Roche

Stage 4, Stephen Roche

Stage 1 (TTT) Paris–Nice (Note: Urs Zimmermann, Claudio Chiappucci, Erich Mächler, Jørgen Pedersen, Walter Magnago, Eddy Schepers, Bruno Leali, Stephen Roche)
Stage 7b Paris–Nice, Stephen Roche
Milan–San Remo, Erich Mächler
Overall Tour de Romandie, Stephen Roche

Stages 5a & 5b, Stephen Roche

Overall Giro d'Italia, Stephen Roche

Prologue & Stage 13, Roberto Visentini
Stages 1b, & 22 Stephen Roche
Stage 12, Guido Bontempi

Prologue & Stage 3b Critérium du Dauphiné Libéré, Erich Mächler
Preis Vom Seetal, Erich Mächler
Italy National Road Championships, Bruno Leali
Overall Tour de France, Stephen Roche

Stage 2 (TTT) (Note: Giancarlo Perini, Davide Cassani, Jørgen Pedersen, Guido Bontempi, Eddy Schepers, Stephen Roche, Massimo Ghirotto, Erich Mächler, Urs Zimmermann)
Stage 10, Stephen Roche

Kortenhoef Criterium, Stephen Roche
Linne Criterium, Guido Bontempi
Sint-Truiden Criterium, Guido Bontempi
Coppa Placci, Massimo Ghirotto
Coppa Bernocchi, Guido Bontempi
UCI Road World Championships, Stephen Roche
Trofeo Baracchi (TTT), Bruno Leali & Massimo Ghirotto
Aalsmeer Criterium, Stephen Roche
Super Prestige Pernod, Stephen Roche

1988
Overall Volta a la Comunitat Valenciana, Erich Mächler

Prologue & Stage 4b, Erich Mächler

Stages 1 & 5 Settimana Siciliana, Guido Bontempi
Stages 3 & 6b Tirreno–Adriatico, Erich Mächler
E3 Prijs Vlaanderen, Guido Bontempi
Stage 1 Vuelta a España, Ettore Pastorelli
Stage 4b Tour de Romandie, Urs Zimmermann
Stages 2 & 5 Giro d'Italia, Guido Bontempi
GP Industria & Artigianato, Massimo Ghirotto
Prologue Tour de France, Guido Bontempi
Coppa Bernocchi, Guido Bontempi

1989
Stage 7 Vuelta a España, Massimo Ghirotto
Stage 2 Giro d'Italia, Acácio Da Silva
Stage 1 Tour de France, Acácio Da Silva
Coppa Placci, Claudio Chiappucci
Stage 1b GP de Sintra, Acácio Da Silva
Giro del Piemonte, Claudio Chiappucci

1990
Stage 4 Settimana Siciliana, Claudio Chiappucci
Points classification Volta a la Comunitat Valenciana, Guido Bontempi

Stages 1 & 2, Guido Bontempi

Stage 7 Paris–Nice, Claudio Chiappucci
GP Pino Cerami, Maximilian Sciandri
Overall Giro di Puglia, Guido Bontempi

Stage 1, Guido Bontempi

Stages 2, 3a, 4, 5 & 6 Vuelta a Aragón, Maximilian Sciandri
Mountains classification Giro d'Italia, Claudio Chiappucci
Stage 1a Tour de Luxembourg, Acácio Da Silva
Stage 3 Tour de Luxembourg, Bruno Bonnet
Stage 4 Tour de Luxembourg, Erich Mächler
Giro dell'Appennino, Flavio Giupponi
Stage 9 Tour de France, Massimo Ghirotto
Stage 19 Tour de France, Guido Bontempi
Geraardsbergen Criterium, Claudio Chiappucci
Critérium cycliste international de Quillan, Claudio Chiappucci

1991
Stages 2 & 4b Vuelta a Murcia, Djamolidine Abduzhaparov
Milan–San Remo, Claudio Chiappucci
Stage 1a Driedaagse van De Panne, Maximilian Sciandri
Gent–Wevelgem, Djamolidine Abduzhaparov
Stages 10 & 15 Vuelta a España, Guido Bontempi
Points classification Giro d'Italia, Claudio Chiappucci

Stage 6, Vladimir Pulnikov
Stage 9, Massimo Ghirotto
Stage 11, Maximilian Sciandri

Stage 2 Tour de Luxembourg, Guido Bontempi
Points classification Tour de France, Djamolidine Abduzhaparov

Mountains classification, Claudio Chiappucci
Stages 1 & 4, Djamolidine Abduzhaparov
Stage 13, Claudio Chiappucci

Draai van de Kaai, Claudio Chiappucci
Circuito delle Mura - Città di Marostica, Claudio Chiappucci
Stage 7 Volta a Catalunya, Djamolidine Abduzhaparov
Giro del Piemonte, Djamolidine Abduzhaparov

1992
Stages 5a & 6 Volta a la Comunitat Valenciana, Djamolidine Abduzhaparov
Stage 4 Vuelta al País Vasco, Vladimir Pulnikov
Giro dell'Appennino, Claudio Chiappucci
Points classification Vuelta a España, Djamolidine Abduzhaparov

Stages 2a, 4, 11 & 21, Djamolidine Abduzhaparov

Mountains classification Giro d'Italia, Claudio Chiappucci

Stages 6 & 8, Guido Bontempi

Mountains classification Tour de France, Claudio Chiappucci

Stages 5, Guido Bontempi
Stages 13, Claudio Chiappucci
Stages 16, Stephen Roche

Boxmeer, Criterium, Claudio Chiappucci
Castillon-la-Bataille, Criterium, Claudio Chiappucci
Gouden Pijl, Claudio Chiappucci
Wincanton Classic, Massimo Ghirotto
La Louvière, Claudio Chiappucci
Overall Cronostaffetta (Note: Giancarlo Perini, Vladimir Pulnikov, Andrea Tafi, Fabio Roscioli, Alessandro Giannelli)

Stage 1b (Note: Giancarlo Perini, Vladimir Pulnikov, Andrea Tafi, Fabio Roscioli, Alessandro Giannelli)

Sprint classification Clásico RCN : Fabio Roscioli

Stage 1, Claudio Chiappucci
Stage 4, Alessandro Giannelli
Stage 5, Vladimir Pulnikov

1993
Stage 3 Volta a la Comunitat Valenciana, Guido Bontempi
Stage 3a Driedaagse van De Panne, Rolf Sørensen
Liège–Bastogne–Liège, Rolf Sørensen
Eschborn-Frankfurt City Loop, Rolf Sørensen
Prologue & Stages 1 & 4b Tour de Romandie, Rolf Sørensen
Amsterdam Rai Derny Race, Rolf Sørensen
Mountains classification Giro d'Italia, Claudio Chiappucci

Stage 6, Guido Bontempi
Stage 14, Claudio Chiappucci

Stage 9 Tour de Suisse, Rolf Sørensen
Stage 12 Tour de France, Fabio Roscioli
Stage 17 Tour de France, Claudio Chiappucci
Chateau-Chinon-Ville Criterium, Stephen Roche
GP de la Ville de Lourdes, Claudio Chiappucci
Clasica San Sebastian, Claudio Chiappucci
Lamballe Criterium, Claudio Chiappucci
Coppa Bernocchi, Rolf Sørensen
Coppa Sabatini, Claudio Chiappucci
Milano–Torino, Rolf Sørensen
Giro del Piemonte, Beat Zberg
Japan Cup, Claudio Chiappucci

1994
Stage 8 Vuelta y Ruta de Mexico, Samuele Schiavina
Stage 14 Vuelta y Ruta de Mexico, Marco Artunghi
Stages 14 & 15 Giro d'Italia, Marco Pantani
Stage 20 Giro d'Italia, Vladimir Pulnikov
Young rider classification Tour de France, Marco Pantani
Quillan, Claudio Chiappucci
Overall Volta a Catalunya, Claudio Chiappucci

Stage 4, Claudio Chiappucci

Circuito Alzanese, Mario Traversoni
Giro del Piemonte, Nicola Miceli
Japan Cup, Claudio Chiappucci

1995
Stage 1 Tour de Romandie, Beat Zberg
Overall Vuelta a Asturias, Beat Zberg

Stage 4, Samuele Schiavina
Stage 6, Beat Zberg

Stage 11 Giro d'Italia, Enrico Zaina
Young rider classification Tour de France, Marco Pantani

Stages 9, 10 & 14, Marco Pantani

Klagenfurt Criterium, Claudio Chiappucci
Giro del Piemonte, Claudio Chiappucci
Overall Escalada a Montjuich, Claudio Chiappucci

Stage 1a, Claudio Chiappucci

Japan Cup, Claudio Chiappucci

1996
Berner Rundfahrt, Beat Zberg
Eschborn-Frankfurt City Loop, Beat Zberg
Stages 9 & 20 Giro d'Italia, Enrico Zaina
Overall Tour de Suisse, Peter Luttenberger

Stage 6, Peter Luttenberger

Stage 15 Tour de France, Massimo Podenzana
Stage 5 GP Guillaume Tell, Markus Zberg

== Supplementary statistics ==
Grand Tours by highest finishing position
Race	1979	1980	1981	1982	1983	1984	1985	1986	1987	1988	1989	1990	1991	1992	1993	1994	1995	1996
Vuelta a España	–	–	1	–	–	–	–	–	–	15	58	–	47	15	–	–	87	–
Giro d'Italia	–	3	1	16	2	18	23	1	1	3	6	12	2	2	3	2	4	2
Tour de France	6	–	–	58	–	22	23	3	1	22	40	2	3	2	6	3	11	5
Major week-long stage races by highest finishing position
Race	1979	1980	1981	1982	1983	1984	1985	1986	1987	1988	1989	1990	1991	1992	1993	1994	1995	1996
Paris–Nice	–	–	–	–	–	–	–	2	4	34	27	7	–	–	–	–	–	–
Tirreno–Adriatico	3	14	5	–	1	3	–	7	–	1	8	16	11	8	16	7	9	12
Volta a Catalunya	–	–	–	–	–	–	–	–	–	–	–	45	33	–	5	1	4	–
Tour of the Basque Country	1	19	–	–	2	–	–	–	12	–	–	13	1	6	2	3	33	12
/ Tour de Romandie	–	–	–	–	7	–	8	8	1	3	5	16	–	–	2	11	5	7
Critérium du Dauphiné	–	–	–	–	–	–	–	1	30	37	–	–	–	–	–	–	–	–
Tour de Suisse	9	–	–	–	12	–	5	4	14	–	12	–	44	12	9	2	5	1
Tour de Pologne	–	–	–	–	–	–	–	–	–	–	–	–	–	–	–	–	–	6
Ronde van Nederland	–	–	–	–	–	–	–	–	–	–	–	–	–	–	–	–	–	–
Monument races by highest finishing position
Race	1979	1980	1981	1982	1983	1984	1985	1986	1987	1988	1989	1990	1991	1992	1993	1994	1995	1996
Milan–San Remo	9	18	37	55	2	29	28	15	1	8	17	16	1	35	5	37	8	47
Tour of Flanders	–	–	–	–	–	–	10	7	38	31	53	16	13	18	15	57	4	13
Paris–Roubaix	–	–	–	–	–	–	–	18	9	42	28	42	14	54	–	–	–	21
Liège–Bastogne–Liège	–	–	–	–	–	–	–	23	2	–	21	51	35	14	1	4	7	13
Giro di Lombardia	3	2	3	36	10	8	19	17	6	9	15	19	36	2	4	2	6	21
Classics by highest finishing position
Classic	1979	1980	1981	1982	1983	1984	1985	1986	1987	1988	1989	1990	1991	1992	1993	1994	1995	1996
Omloop Het Volk	–	–	–	–	–	–	–	NH	–	–	–	–	–	–	–	–	–	–
E3 Harelbeke	–	–	–	–	–	–	–	–	–	1	–	–	–	23	35	–	12	–
Gent–Wevelgem	–	–	–	–	–	1	15	1	18	33	22	23	1	35	33	47	16	12
Amstel Gold Race	–	–	–	–	–	–	–	–	–	23	28	11	20	8	15	7	3	10
La Flèche Wallonne	–	–	21	–	–	–	–	14	4	–	8	56	3	12	3	7	7	6
Clásica de San Sebastián	NH		–	–	–	–	–	–	–	–	22	12	11	2	1	4	18	3
Paris–Tours	–	–	–	–	–	–	20	17	5	14	9	31	11	31	16	19	–	39

Legend
—	Did not compete
DNF	Did not finish
NH	Not held
