= 1988 E3 Prijs Vlaanderen =

1988 E3 Harelbeke
Race details
- Dates: 26 March 1988
- Stages: 1
- Distance: 231 km (144 mi)
- Winning time: 4h 55' 00"

Results
	Winner	Guido Bontempi (ITA)	(Carrera Jeans–Vagabond)
	Second	Allan Peiper (AUS)	(Panasonic–Isostar–Colnago–Agu)
	Third	Eddy Planckaert (BEL)	(AD Renting–Mini-Flat–Enerday)

The 1988 E3 Harelbeke was the 31st edition of the E3 Harelbeke cycle race and was held on 26 March 1988. The race started and finished in Harelbeke. The race was won by Guido Bontempi of the Carrera team.

== General classification ==
Final general classification

Rank	Rider	Team	Time
1	Guido Bontempi (ITA)	Carrera Jeans–Vagabond	4h 55' 00"
2	Allan Peiper (AUS)	Panasonic–Isostar–Colnago–Agu	+ 3"
3	Eddy Planckaert (BEL)	AD Renting–Mini-Flat–Enerday	+ 20"
4	Mathieu Hermans (NED)	Caja Rural–Orbea	+ 20"
5	Herman Frison (BEL)	Roland	+ 20"
6	Jozef Lieckens (BEL)	Hitachi–Bosal–B.C.E. Snooker	+ 20"
7	Eric Vanderaerden (BEL)	Panasonic–Isostar–Colnago–Agu	+ 20"
8	Nico Verhoeven (NED)	Superconfex–Yoko–Opel–Colnago	+ 20"
9	Hendrik Redant (BEL)	Isoglass–EVS–Robland	+ 20"
10	Søren Lilholt (DEN)	Sigma–Fina	+ 20"
