= Bruno Leali =

Italian cyclist

Personal information
- Born: 6 March 1958 (age 68) Roe Volciano, Italy

Cycling career
- Sport: Cycling
- Current team: Retired
- Discipline: Road
- Role: Rider

Professional teams
- 1979–1988: Inoxpran
- 1989: Gewiss–Bianchi
- 1990: Jolly Componibili–Club 88
- 1991: Gis Gelati–Ballan
- 1992–1993: Mercatone Uno–Medeghini–Zucchini
- 1994: Brescialat–Ceramiche Refin

Managerial teams
- 1994–1995: Brescialat–Ceramiche Refin
- 1996: San Marco Group
- 1998: Riso Scotti
- 2000–2001: Mercatone Uno–Albacom

Bruno Leali (born 6 March 1958 in Roe Volciano) is an Italian former professional racing cyclist. He rode in 14 editions of the Giro d'Italia, six editions of the Tour de France and four editions of the Vuelta a España.

After retiring from cycling, Leali became the sports director for various teams, including an amateur cycling team he founded. In 2010, Leali was found to possess illicit drugs during the Girobio. The team, Lucchini-Unidelta, was therefore removed from the race. In 2011, the Italian Olympic Committee banned Leali from sport for life in May 2011 and sentenced him to a 20,000 euro fine. In September 2015, he was also included on the World Anti-Doping Agency's list of sporting staff who have been banned for life.

== Major results ==
1980
1st Stage 5 Tour of the Basque Country
3rd GP Industria & Artigianato di Larciano
1982
2nd Coppa Placci
3rd Coppa Bernocchi
1983
2nd Giro del Trentino
3rd Giro del Friuli
3rd Milano–Vignola
1984
1st Stage 18 Giro d'Italia
1st Stage 2 Ruota d'Oro
2nd Giro di Toscana
3rd Ruota d'Oro
1985
1st Giro del Lazio
2nd Coppa Placci
1986
2nd Coppa Placci
3rd Memorial Nencini
1987
1st National Road Race Championships
1st Coppa Ugo Agostoni
1st Trofeo Baracchi (with Massimo Ghirotto)
2nd Giro del Friuli
2nd Giro del Lazio
9th Paris–Roubaix
1988
2nd Memorial Nencini
3rd Trofeo Luis Puig
1989
1st Overall Settimana Internazionale di Coppi e Bartali
1990
3rd Trofeo Laigueglia
1991
1st Stage 4 Grand Prix du Midi Libre
2nd Gran Premio Città di Camaiore
1993
3rd Settimana Ciclistica Lombarda
