= Jørgen Pedersen =

Danish epidemiologist (1914–1978)

Jørgen Pedersen (1914–1978) was a Danish epidemiologist. He is known for his hypothesis concerning the correlation of hyperglycemia during pregnancy and disease in later life.

== Life and work ==
In 1952 he formulated the hypothesis that hyperglycemia in pregnant women might lead to hyperglycemia in their fetuses, causing complications in infancy and later life.

Hyperglycemia in pregnancy is associated with unfavorable fetal and neonatal outcomes, since an increased maternal blood sugar value correlated with increased fetal insulin levels and is involved so directly to the development of diabetic foetopathy.

To consume sugar, soft drinks and sugary-sweetened foods is significantly positively correlated with a risk of a pathologically increased amount of glucose in the blood and diabetes.

The annual Joergen Pedersen Lecture, in honor of Pedersen, has been established by the Diabetic Pregnancy Study Group of the European Association for the Study of Diabetes since 1980.
