= 1992 Giro d'Italia =

Italian cycling race

Race details
- Dates: 24 May — 14 June 1992
- Stages: 22
- Distance: 3,843 km (2,388 mi)
- Winning time: 103h 36' 08"

Results
Jersey awarded to the overall winner	Winner	Miguel Induráin (ESP)	(Banesto)
	Second	Claudio Chiappucci (ITA)	(Carrera Jeans–Vagabond)
	Third	Franco Chioccioli (ITA)	(GB–MG Maglificio)
Jersey awarded to the points classification winner	Points	Mario Cipollini (ITA)	(GB–MG Maglificio)
Jersey awarded to the mountains classification winner	Mountains	Claudio Chiappucci (ITA)	(Carrera Jeans–Vagabond)
Jersey awarded to the youth classification winner	Youth	Pavel Tonkov (RUS)	(Lampre–Colnago)
Jersey awarded to the intergiro classification winner	Intergiro	Miguel Induráin (ESP)	(Banesto)
	Team	GB–MG Maglificio	

The 1992 Giro d'Italia was the 75th edition of the race. It started off in Genoa on 24 May with an 8 km (5.0 mi) individual time trial. The race concluded in Milan with an 66 km (41.0 mi) individual time trial on 14 June. Twenty teams entered the race, which was won by the Spaniard Miguel Induráin of the Banesto team. Second and third respectively were the Italians Claudio Chiappucci and Franco Chioccioli. Indurain's victory in the 1992 Giro was his first step in completing the Giro – Tour double – winning the Giro d'Italia and Tour de France in one calendar year – becoming the sixth rider to accomplish this feat, with the first being Fausto Coppi in 1949.

Thierry Marie won the event's opening leg and in doing so, became the first rider to wear the race leader's maglia rosa (pink jersey) in this edition. He held the race lead for another stage, before he lost it to eventual winner Indurain upon the conclusion of the third stage who held it for the rest of the race's duration. Indurain built upon his advantage during the fourth and twenty-second stages, both individual time trials, and protected the lead by responding to most attacks from his rivals during the mountainous stages.

Indurain became the first Spanish rider to win the Giro d'Italia. Indurain also won the secondary intergiro classification. In the race's other classifications, Lampre–Colnago rider Pavel Tonkov of Russia finished as the best rider aged 25 or under in the general classification, finishing in seventh place overall; Mario Cipollini of the GB–MG Maglificio team was the winner of the points classification, with GB-MG Maglificio finishing as the winners of the team classification, ranking each of the twenty teams contesting the race by lowest cumulative time.

== Teams ==
Twenty teams were invited by the race organizers to participate in the 1992 edition of the Giro d'Italia. Each team sent a squad of nine riders, which meant that the race started with a peloton of 180 cyclists. Italy (71), France (19), Spain (19), Germany (11), and Colombia (10) all had more than 10 riders. Of these, 70 were riding the Giro d'Italia for the first time. The average age of riders was 27.48 years, ranging from 22–year–old Andrea Ferrigato (Ariostea) to 36–year–old Sean Kelly (Lotus–Festina). The team with the youngest average rider age was Castorama (25), while the oldest was Motorola (29). From the riders that began the race, 148 made it to the finish in Milan.

The teams that took part in the race were:

- Amore & Vita–Fanini
- Ariostea
- Banesto
- Carrera Jeans–Vagabond
- Castorama
- Gatorade–Chateau d'Ax
- GB–MG Maglificio
- Italbonifica–Navigare
- Jolly Componibili–Club 88
- Lampre–Colnago
- Lotus–Festina
- Mercatone Uno–Medeghini–Zucchini
- Motorola
- ONCE
- Postobón–Manzana–Ryalcao
- Seur
- Team Telekom
- Tulip Computers
- Z
- ZG Mobili–Selle Italia

== Pre-race favorites ==
The starting peloton did include the previous year's winner Franco Chioccioli. According to author Bill McGann, Miguel Induráin came into the race with the aims of riding it for preparation for the Tour de France in July. Claudio Chiappucci came into the race as a contender after finishing on the podium at the previous season's Giro d'Italia and Tour de France. The Spanish newspaper El País believed Indurain to be the favorite heading into the first day of racing. However, the newspaper did state that his chances were lower since his teammate Jean-François Bernard was not participating in the race due to an injury. l'Unità writer Dario Ceccarelli and Avui writer Recuero believed that Chiappucci and Indurain were the favorites to win the overall crown. Spanish newspaper Diari de Girona named Indurain, Chiappucci, Laurent Fignon, and Massimiliano Lelli the main contenders to win the race.

== Route and stages ==
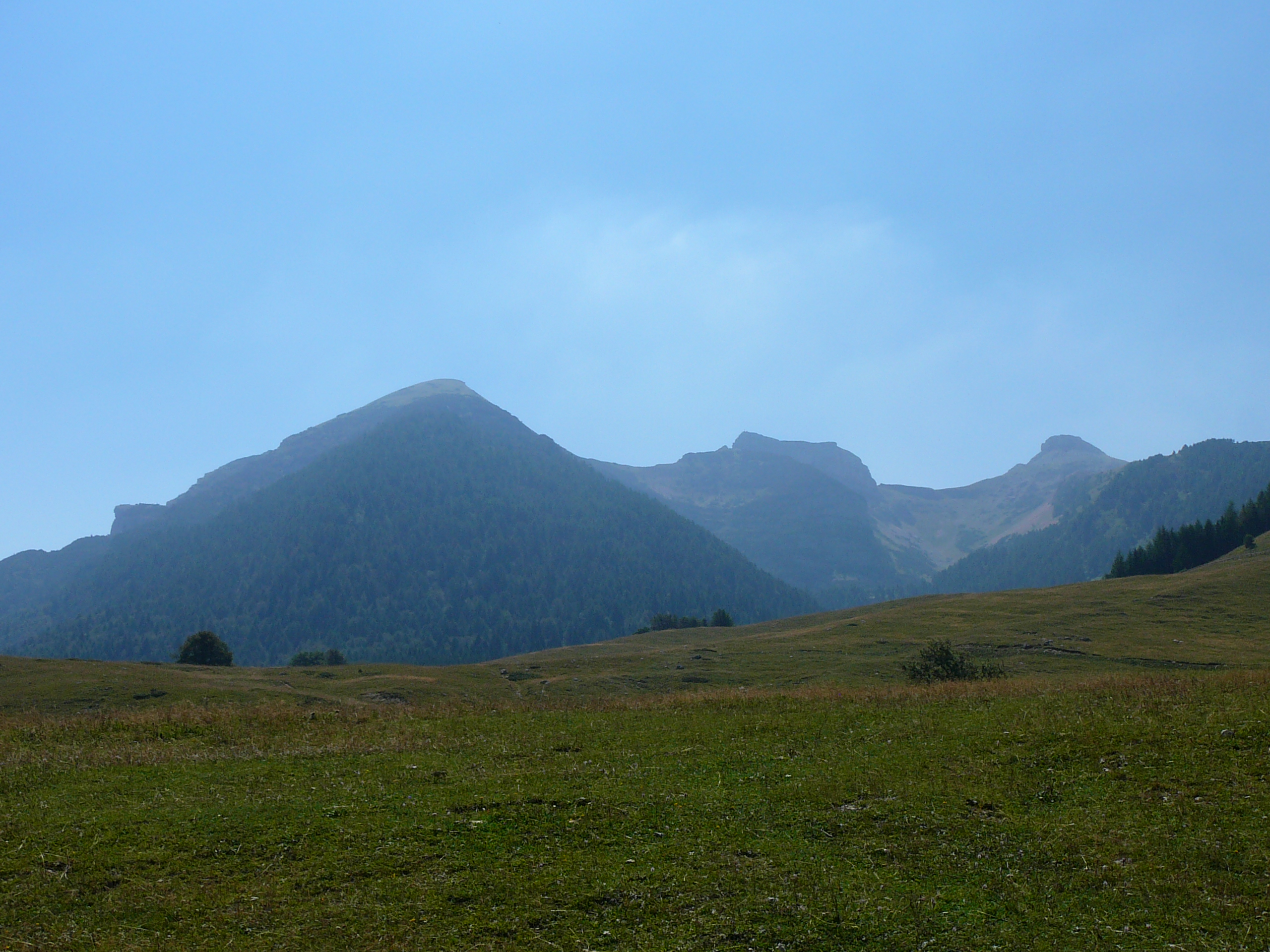
The 205 km (127 mi) fourteenth stage began in Corvara and contained a summit finish atop Monte Bondone (pictured).

The route for the 1992 Giro d'Italia was unveiled by race director Carmine Castellano on 30 November 1991. It contained three time trial events, all of which were individual. There were eleven stages containing high mountains, of which four had summit finishes: stage 10, to Monte Terminillo; stage 14, to Monte Bondone; stage 18, to Monviso; and stage 19, to Pila. The organizers chose to include no rest days. When compared to the previous year's race, the race was 128 km (80 mi) longer and lacked an opening time trial prologue. In addition, this race contained one less of half stages.

El País felt that the route was best suited for an all-round cyclist, while stating that final 66 km (41 mi) individual time trial would be decisive in determining the winner of the race. Avui writer Recuero believed that the course was the toughest in years, while also stating that many experts found that the race route was well balanced between the time spent in the mountains and the distance allocated to time trials. The race's nineteenth stage, which began and ended in Saluzzo, was named the queen stage for the amount of difficult mountains contained in the stage.

Stage results
Stage	Date	Course	Distance	Type	Winner
1	24 May	Genoa	8 km (5 mi)	Individual time trial	Thierry Marie (FRA)
2	25 May	Genoa to Uliveto Terme	194 km (121 mi)	Plain stage	Endrio Leoni (ITA)
3	26 May	Uliveto Terme to Arezzo	174 km (108 mi)	Stage with mountain(s)	Maximilian Sciandri (ITA)
4	27 May	Arezzo to Sansepolcro	38 km (24 mi)	Individual time trial	Miguel Induráin (ESP)
5	28 May	Sansepolcro to Porto Sant'Elpidio	198 km (123 mi)	Plain stage	Mario Cipollini (ITA)
6	29 May	Porto Sant'Elpidio to Sulmona	223 km (139 mi)	Stage with mountain(s)	Franco Vona (ITA)
7	30 May	Roccaraso to Melfi	232 km (144 mi)	Stage with mountain(s)	Guido Bontempi (ITA)
8	31 May	Melfi to Aversa	184 km (114 mi)	Plain stage	Mario Cipollini (ITA)
9	1 June	Aversa to Latina	165 km (103 mi)	Plain stage	Guido Bontempi (ITA)
10	2 June	Latina to Monte Terminillo	196 km (122 mi)	Stage with mountain(s)	Luis Herrera (COL)
11	3 June	Montepulciano to Imola	233 km (145 mi)	Stage with mountain(s)	Roberto Pagnin (ITA)
12	4 June	Imola to Bassano del Grappa	214 km (133 mi)	Plain stage	Endrio Leoni (ITA)
13	5 June	Bassano del Grappa to Corvara	204 km (127 mi)	Stage with mountain(s)	Franco Vona (ITA)
14	6 June	Corvara to Monte Bondone	205 km (127 mi)	Stage with mountain(s)	Giorgio Furlan (ITA)
15	7 June	Riva del Garda to Palazzolo sull'Oglio	171 km (106 mi)	Plain stage	François Simon (FRA)
16	8 June	Palazzolo sull'Oglio to Sondrio	166 km (103 mi)	Stage with mountain(s)	Marco Saligari (ITA)
17	9 June	Sondrio to Vercelli	203 km (126 mi)	Plain stage	Mario Cipollini (ITA)
18	10 June	Vercelli to Pian del Re	200 km (124 mi)	Stage with mountain(s)	Marco Giovannetti (ITA)
19	11 June	Saluzzo to Pila	260 km (162 mi)	Stage with mountain(s)	Udo Bölts (GER)
20	12 June	Saint Vincent to Verbania	201 km (125 mi)	Stage with mountain(s)	Franco Chioccioli (ITA)
21	13 June	Verbania to Vigevano	95 km (59 mi)	Plain stage	Mario Cipollini (ITA)
22	14 June	Vigevano to Milan	66 km (41 mi)	Individual time trial	Miguel Induráin (ESP)
	Total		3,843 km (2,388 mi)		

== Race overview ==
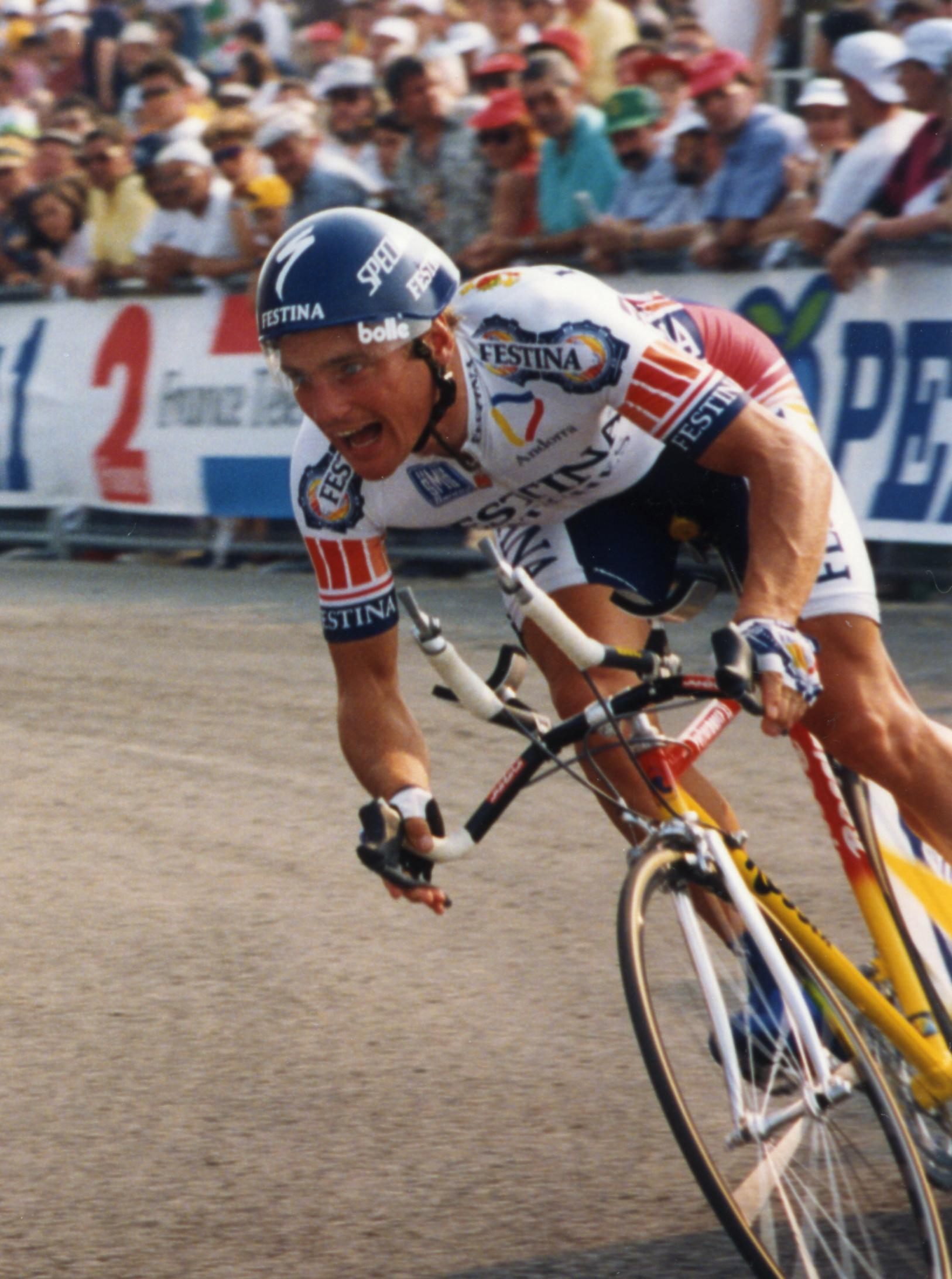
Frenchman Thierry Marie won the opening stage of the 1992 Giro d'Italia and wore the race leader's maglia rosa for two days.

The Giro began with a short 8 km (5.0 mi) individual time trial that navigated through the streets of Genoa, which was won by Thierry Marie by a margin of three seconds. The next day of racing culminated with a bunch sprint that was won by Jolly Componibili-Club 88's Endrio Leoni after the leading two-man breakaway just kilometers before the finish. Banesto controlled the pace-making for most of the third stage before general classification contender Claudio Chiappucci attacked. Chiappucci attacked near the end of the stage, but was caught by his rivals. Motorola's Maximilian Sciandri edged out Massimiliano Lelli for the stage win as the race lead shifted from Marie to Miguel Induráin. Indurain increased his advantage over the rest of the competing riders by winning the stage 4 individual time trial by thirty-two seconds.

The race's sixth stage was the first stage containing several climbs of great difficulty. As the stage progressed, the general classification contenders formed a group on the road. Chiappucci and Marco Giovannetti attacked a few times, with all of their attempts being marked by the other riders. The contenders all crossed the finish line together seconds after stage winner Franco Vona, with Frenchman Laurent Fignon being the only one to lose time. The following day, sprinter Guido Bontempi and Giuseppe Petito formed a breakaway group that survived to the stage's conclusion, with Bontempi taking the stage victory. Stages 8 and 9 both came down to field sprints won by Mario Cipollini and Bontempi, respectively.

The event's tenth stage featured a summit finish to Monte Terminillo. The general classification contenders were all in a group together as they reached the final climb of the day. Piotr Ugrumov was the first of the group to attack and was joined by Roberto Conti shortly after. Behind, Indurain led a chase group that contained Andrew Hampsten, Chiappucci, Giovannetti, and Luis Herrera, while general classification hopefuls Chioccioli and Fignon dropped off the back since they could not keep pace. The group caught Conti, who was alone after Ugrumov slowed, and from there, Herrera attacked to win the stage. The next day's route was an undulating one. Chioccioli, Roberto Pagnin, and Marco Lietti formed a breakaway group and gained an advantage of three and a half minutes over the main field which was led by Indurain's team, Banesto. The group remained in front, Pagnin took the stage victory, and Indurain finished over two minutes later. With around nine kilometers remaining in the twelfth stage, there was an accident that saw Chiappicci and Giovannetti amongst others go down. The peloton continued on, gearing up for a sprint finish that Leoni won.

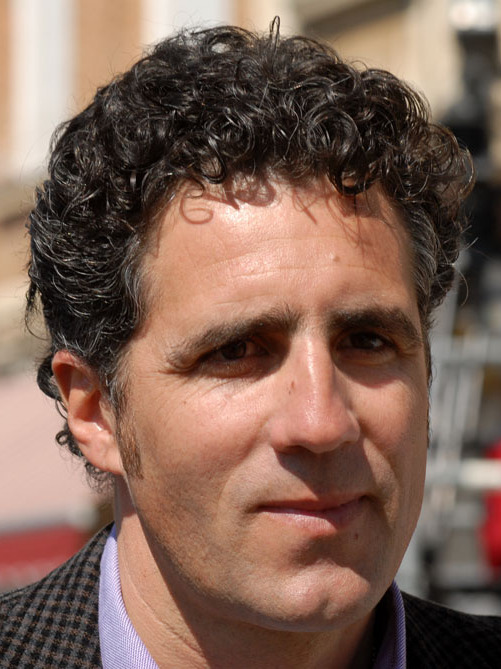
Miguel Induráin (pictured in 2009) won the 1992 Giro d'Italia and became the first Spaniard to win the race.

The race entered the Dolomites in the thirteenth stage. Indurain was attacked several times on the final climb of the day by Chioccioli, Giovannetti, and Chiappucci; however, he was able to counter each attack and the group of main competitors finished together three after the stage winner, Vona. The next day was the most mountainous of the race, according to El País writer Paolo Viberti, as it contained the Passo Pordoi and twice climbed Monte Bondone, with the second being the end of the stage. Giorgio Furlan launched a solo attack that won him the stage as the general classification contenders attacked each other behind. Indurain marked each move that was made by his rivals, except for a last ditch effort by Chioccioli that allowed him to finish five seconds ahead of the rest of the general classification hopefuls. The next leg of the race saw a nine-man group form a breakaway after the stage started. The breakaway group was not caught and reached the finish line where Castorama's François Simon won sprint to the line. Marco Saligari won the sixteenth stage after participating in a breakaway that lasted around 146 km (90.7 mi).

The eighteenth stage featured a summit finish to the Pian del Re. After several rival riders attacked Indurain, a group of general classification riders were leading on the road going into the final climb of the day. As the climb wore on, the group thinned and Gatorade–Chateau d'Ax's Giovannetti attacked on a false flat with about 500 m (1,640.4 ft) remaining in the stage to win the day. Giancarlo Perini and Udo Bölts caught the nineteenth stage's leading rider on the road, Ramon González. Bölts attacked with two kilometers left on the day and rode solo to stage victory. Meanwhile, race leader Indurain countered all the attacks made by his rivals and maintained his advantage.

The event's twentieth stage saw Chioccioli and Chiappucci attack Indurain several times. Chioccioli won the stage and was the first over most of the categorized climbs on the stage, but Indurain finished with the same time. The penultimate stage resulted in a field sprint that was won by Cipollini for his fourth victory of this edition. The final stage of the race was a 66 km (41.0 mi) individual time trial. Race leader Indurain won the stage by two minutes and forty-six seconds over the second-place finisher on the stage, thereby sealing his overall victory.

Five riders achieved multiple stage victories: Cipollini (stages 5, 8, 17, and 21), Bontempi (stages 7 and 9), Leoni (stages 2 and 12), Vona (stages 6 and 13), and Indurain (stages 4 and 22). Stage wins were achieved by eleven of the twenty competing squads, six of which won multiple stages. GB-MG Maglificio collected a total of seven stage wins through three riders, Cipollini, Vona, and Chioccioli (stage 20). Carrera Jeans-Vagabond amassed a total of two stage victories through Bontempi. Jolly Componibili-Club 88 achieved the same feat through Leoni. Castorama earned two stage wins through Marie (stage 1) and Simon (stage 15). Ariostea gained two stage victories through Furlan (stage 14) and Saligari (stage 16). Banesto collected two stage success through Indurain. Motorola, Postobón-Manzana-Ryalcao, Lotus-Festina, Gatorade-Chateau d'Ax, and Team Telekom all won a single stage at the Giro, the first through Sciandri (stage 3), the second through Herrera (stage 10), the third with Pagnin (stage 11), the fourth with Giovannetti (stage 18), and the fifth through Bölts (stage 19).

== Classification leadership ==
Five different jerseys were worn during the 1992 Giro d'Italia. The leader of the general classification – calculated by adding the stage finish times of each rider, and allowing time bonuses for the first three finishers on mass-start stages – wore a pink jersey. This classification is the most important of the race, and its winner is considered as the winner of the Giro.

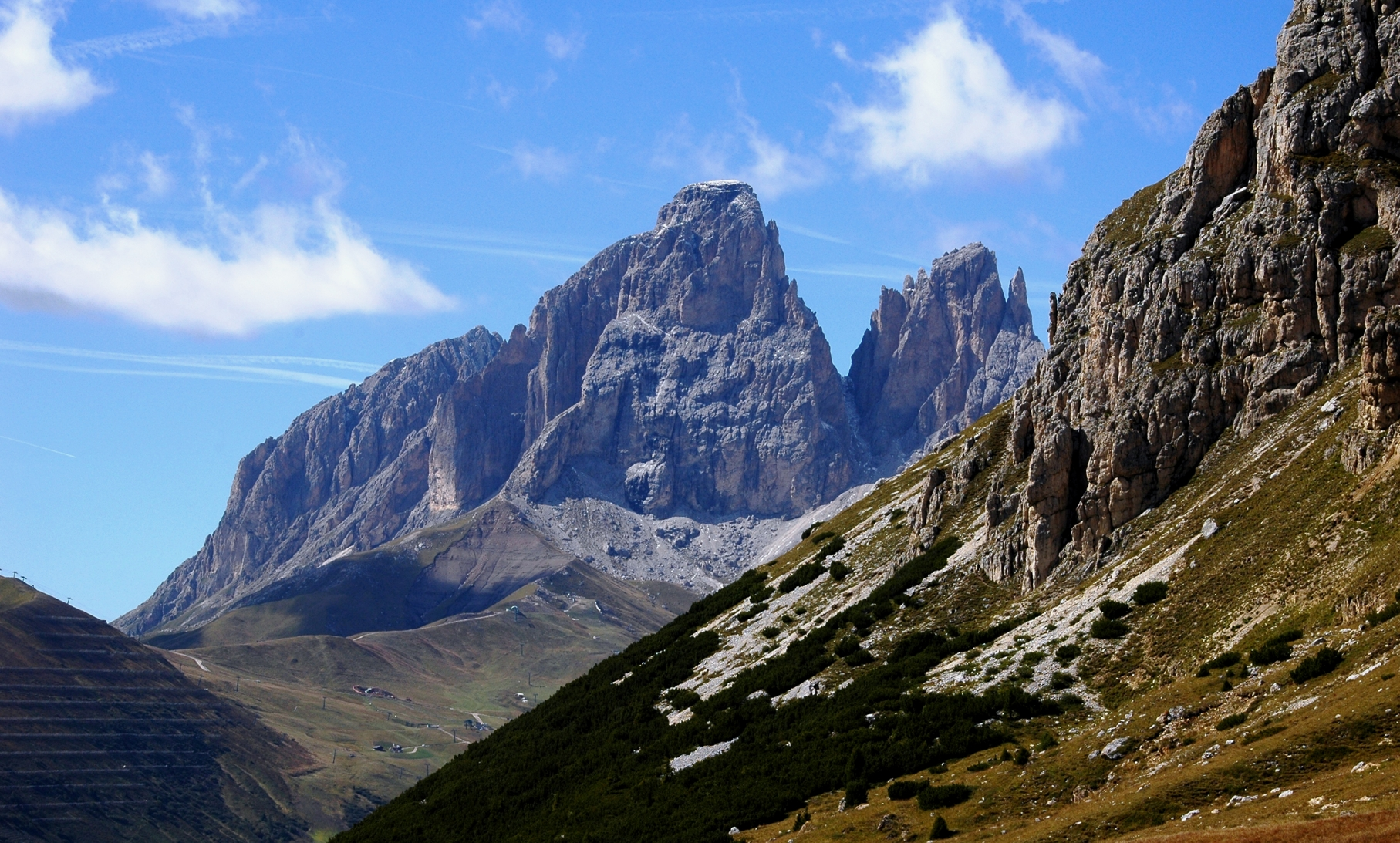
The Pordoi Pass was the Cima Coppi for the 1992 running of the Giro d'Italia.

For the points classification, which awarded a purple (or cyclamen) jersey to its leader, cyclists were given points for finishing a stage in the top 15; additional points could also be won in intermediate sprints. The green jersey was awarded to the mountains classification leader. In this ranking, points were won by reaching the summit of a climb ahead of other cyclists. Each climb was ranked as either first, second or third category, with more points available for higher category climbs. The Cima Coppi, the race's highest point of elevation, awarded more points than the other first category climbs. The Cima Coppi for this Giro was the Passo Pordoi. The first rider to cross the Pordoi Pass was Italian Claudio Chiappucci. The white jersey was worn by the leader of young rider classification, a ranking decided the same way as the general classification, but only riders born after 1 January 1968 were eligible for it.

The intergiro classification was marked by a blue jersey. The calculation for the intergiro is similar to that of the general classification, in each stage there is a midway point that the riders pass through a point and where their time is stopped. As the race goes on, their times compiled and the person with the lowest time is the leader of the intergiro classification and wears the blue jersey. Although no jersey was awarded, there was also one classification for the teams, in which the stage finish times of the best three cyclists per team were added; the leading team was the one with the lowest total time.

The rows in the following table correspond to the jerseys awarded after that stage was run.

Classification leadership by stage
Stage	Winner	General classification	Points classification	Mountains classification	Young rider classification	Intergiro classification	Team classification
1	Thierry Marie	Thierry Marie	Thierry Marie	not awarded	Julio César Ortegón	Miguel Induráin	Castorama
2	Endrio Leoni	Thierry Marie	Mario Cipollini	Germano Pierdomenico	Julio César Ortegón	Stefano Zanini	Castorama
3	Maximilian Sciandri	Miguel Induráin	Maximilian Sciandri	Germano Pierdomenico	Yvon Ledanois	Adriano Baffi	Banesto
4	Miguel Induráin	Miguel Induráin	Miguel Induráin	Miguel Induráin	Armand de Las Cuevas	Miguel Induráin	Banesto
5	Mario Cipollini	Miguel Induráin	Miguel Induráin	Miguel Induráin	Armand de Las Cuevas	Miguel Induráin	Banesto
6	Franco Vona	Miguel Induráin	Miguel Induráin	Roberto Conti	Armand de Las Cuevas	Miguel Induráin	Ariostea
7	Guido Bontempi	Miguel Induráin	Miguel Induráin	Roberto Conti	Armand de Las Cuevas	Miguel Induráin	Ariostea
8	Mario Cipollini	Miguel Induráin	Mario Cipollini	Roberto Conti	Armand de Las Cuevas	Miguel Induráin	Ariostea
9	Guido Bontempi	Miguel Induráin	Mario Cipollini	Roberto Conti	Armand de Las Cuevas	Miguel Induráin	Ariostea
10	Luis Herrera	Miguel Induráin	Mario Cipollini	Roberto Conti	Leonardo Sierra	Miguel Induráin	Gatorade
11	Roberto Pagnin	Miguel Induráin	Mario Cipollini	Roberto Conti	Leonardo Sierra	Miguel Induráin	Gatorade
12	Endrio Leoni	Miguel Induráin	Mario Cipollini	Roberto Conti	Leonardo Sierra	Miguel Induráin	GB–MG Maglificio
13	Franco Vona	Miguel Induráin	Mario Cipollini	Roberto Conti	Leonardo Sierra	Miguel Induráin	GB–MG Maglificio
14	Giorgio Furlan	Miguel Induráin	Mario Cipollini	Roberto Conti	Leonardo Sierra	Miguel Induráin	GB–MG Maglificio
15	François Simon	Miguel Induráin	Mario Cipollini	Roberto Conti	Leonardo Sierra	Miguel Induráin	Ariostea
16	Marco Saligari	Miguel Induráin	Mario Cipollini	Claudio Chiappucci	Leonardo Sierra	Miguel Induráin	Ariostea
17	Mario Cipollini	Miguel Induráin	Mario Cipollini	Claudio Chiappucci	Leonardo Sierra	Miguel Induráin	Ariostea
18	Marco Giovannetti	Miguel Induráin	Mario Cipollini	Claudio Chiappucci	Pavel Tonkov	Miguel Induráin	Ariostea
19	Udo Bölts	Miguel Induráin	Mario Cipollini	Claudio Chiappucci	Pavel Tonkov	Miguel Induráin	GB–MG Maglificio
20	Franco Chioccioli	Miguel Induráin	Mario Cipollini	Claudio Chiappucci	Pavel Tonkov	Miguel Induráin	GB–MG Maglificio
21	Mario Cipollini	Miguel Induráin	Mario Cipollini	Claudio Chiappucci	Pavel Tonkov	Miguel Induráin	GB–MG Maglificio
22	Miguel Induráin	Miguel Induráin	Mario Cipollini	Claudio Chiappucci	Pavel Tonkov	Miguel Induráin	GB–MG Maglificio
Final		Miguel Induráin	Mario Cipollini	Claudio Chiappucci	Pavel Tonkov	Miguel Induráin	GB–MG Maglificio

== Final standings ==
Legend
A pink jersey	Denotes the winner of the General classification	A green jersey	Denotes the winner of the Mountains classification
A purple jersey	Denotes the winner of the Points classification	A white jersey	Denotes the winner of the Young rider classification
A blue jersey	Denotes the winner of the Intergiro classification		

=== General classification ===
Final general classification (1–10)
Rank	Name	Team	Time
1	Miguel Induráin (ESP)	Banesto	103h 36' 08"
2	Claudio Chiappucci (ITA)	Carrera Jeans–Vagabond	+ 5' 12"
3	Franco Chioccioli (ITA)	GB–MG Maglificio	+ 7' 16"
4	Marco Giovannetti (ITA)	Gatorade–Chateau d'Ax	+ 8' 01"
5	Andrew Hampsten (USA)	Motorola	+ 11' 12"
6	Franco Vona (ITA)	GB–MG Maglificio	+ 11' 12"
7	Pavel Tonkov (RUS)	Lampre–Colnago	+ 17' 15"
8	Luis Herrera (COL)	Ryalco-Postobón	+ 17' 53"
9	Roberto Conti (ITA)	Ariostea	+ 19' 14"
10	Bruno Cornillet (FRA)	Z	+ 20' 03"

=== Points classification ===
Final points classification (1–5)
	Rider	Team	Points
1	Mario Cipollini (ITA)	GB–MG Maglificio	236
2	Miguel Induráin (ESP)	Banesto	208
3	Maximilian Sciandri (ITA)	Motorola	177
4	Claudio Chiappucci (ITA)	Carrera Jeans–Vagabond	171
5	Franco Chioccioli (ITA)	GB–MG Maglificio	148

=== Mountains classification ===
Final mountains classification (1–5)
	Rider	Team	Points
1	Claudio Chiappucci (ITA)	Carrera Jeans–Vagabond	76
2	Roberto Conti (ITA)	Ariostea	45
3	Miguel Induráin (ESP)	Banesto	35
4	Giorgio Furlan (ITA)	Ariostea	31
5	Giuseppe Calcaterra (ITA)	Amore & Vita–Fanini	23

=== Young rider classification ===
Final young rider's classification (1–5)
	Rider	Team	Time
1	Pavel Tonkov (RUS)	Lampre–Colnago	103h 53' 23"
2	Ivan Gotti (ITA)	Gatorade–Chateau d'Ax	+ 44' 21"
3	Armand de Las Cuevas (FRA)	Banesto	+ 1h 31' 43"
4	Davide Perona (ITA)	ZG Mobili-Fonti Sant'Antonio	+ 1h 56' 14"
5	Ruber Marín (COL)	Ryalco–Postobón	+ 2h 10' 41"

=== Intergiro classification ===
Final intergiro classification (1–3)
	Rider	Team	Time
1	Miguel Induráin (ESP)	Banesto	57h 38' 08"
2	Claudio Chiappucci (ITA)	Carrera Jeans–Vagabond	+ 2' 03"
3	Laurent Bezault (FRA)	Z	+ 2' 08"

=== Team classification ===
Final team classification (1–5)
	Team	Time
1	GB–MG Maglificio	311h 31' 55"
2	Ariostea	+ 22' 34"
2	Gatorade–Chateau d'Ax	+ 22' 34"
4	Mercatone Uno–Medeghini–Zucchini	+ 52' 13"
5	Banesto	+ 56' 15"

== Aftermath ==
Miguel Induráin entered the Tour de France in July as the favorite to win the race. He would go on to win the race after taking the lead upon the finish of the thirteenth stage. By winning the Tour, he became the sixth rider to complete the Giro – Tour double in history. Indurain would go on to repeat this feat again the following calendar year. In April 2018, Indurain was placed into the Giro d'Italia Hall of Fame for his performances during the Giro d'Italia in his career. He was the sixth rider to be inducted.
