= Djamolidine Abdoujaparov =

Uzbekistani cyclist

- Abdoujaparov in 2025

Personal information
- Full name: Djamolidine Abdoujaparov
- Nicknames: The Tashkent Express, The Tashkent Terror, Abdou
- Born: 28 February 1964 (age 62) Tashkent, Uzbek SSR, Soviet Union
- Height: 1.74 m (5 ft 8 1/2 in)
- Weight: 72 kg (159 lb; 11 st 5 lb)

Cycling career
- Sport: Cycling
- Discipline: Road
- Role: Rider
- Rider type: Sprinter

Professional teams
- 1990: Alfa Lum
- 1991–1992: Carrera Jeans–Tassoni
- 1993: Lampre–Polti
- 1994: Team Polti–Vaporetto
- 1995: Novell–Decca–Colnago
- 1996: Refin–Mobilvetta
- 1997: Lotto–Mobistar–Isoglass

Major wins
- Grand Tours Tour de France Points classification (1991, 1993, 1994) 9 individual stages (1991, 1993, 1994, 1995, 1996) Giro d'Italia Points classification (1994) Intergiro classification (1994) 1 individual stage (1994) Vuelta a España Points classification (1992) 7 individual stages (1992, 1993) One-day races and Classics Gent–Wevelgem (1991)

Djamolidine Mirgarifanovich Abdoujaparov (Uzbek: Jamoliddin Mirgarifanovich Abdujaparov; born 28 February 1964) is a former professional road racing cyclist from Uzbekistan. Abdoujaparov was a sprinter, nicknamed "The Tashkent Terror" as he was so ferocious in the sprints. His unorthodox and often erratic sprinting caused a number of crashes. He competed in the individual road race at the Olympic Games on two occasions: in 1988 for the Soviet Union and in 1996 for Uzbekistan; he placed fifth in 1988.

== Career ==
Abdoujaparov was born in Tashkent to a Crimean Tatar family which was forcibly deported to Uzbekistan during Soviet rule. A graduate of the Soviet sports programme, he came into his prime just as his country gained independence; after initial difficulties (including Uzbekistan's not being affiliated to the UCI, which caused problems with the Cycling World Championship) he signed for a Western professional team and became one of the world's top sprinters. Abdoujaparov first rode with the Alfa Lum team in 1990 before the team folded and he joined Carrera Jeans–Tassoni in 1991. Abdoujaparov had numerous tussles with Laurent Jalabert in the Tour de France's green sprinters jersey competition in the early 1990s. In 1991 Abdoujaparov won the competition despite a spectacular crash during the final stage on the Champs-Élysées in Paris, where he collided with the barriers 100 m before the finish and somersaulted into the air. Despite still holding enough points to win the sprinters' jersey, he had to cross the line unaided. Members of his team picked him up, put him back on the bike, and he rode slowly over the last few meters, medical staff walking alongside him.

In his last complete tour in 1996, Abdoujaparov achieved a mountain breakaway for his last stage win, unusual for a sprinter. By this stage, though, results were not as good, and after failing seven separate anti-doping tests during the 1997 season, including twice at the 1997 Tour de France, he retired from cycling. He failed the tests screening for the presence in his body of, among others, the anti-asthma drug clenbuterol.

Abdoujaparov, a British rock band formed by former Carter USM guitarist Les "Fruitbat" Carter, is named after him.

== Major results ==
1985
Tour de l'Avenir

1st Points classification
1st Stage 6b

Giro Ciclistico d'Italia

1st Stages 4, 6 & 9

Circuit de la Sarthe-Pays de la Loire

1st Stages 4a & 4b

1987
Peace Race

1st Stages 7, 11 & 14

3rd Gran Premio Palio del Recioto
1988
Peace Race

1st Points classification
1st Stages 1 & 12

Tour de Pologne

1st Stages 2, 6 & 7

5th Road race, Olympic Games
1989
1st Stage 1 Peace Race
3rd Gran Premio della Liberazione
1990
8th Coppa Bernocchi
1991
1st Gent–Wevelgem
1st Giro del Piemonte
Tour de France

1st Points classification
1st Stages 1 & 4

1st Stage 7 Volta a Catalunya
1st Stage 1 Settimana Internazionale di Coppi e Bartali
Vuelta a Murcia

1st Stages 2 & 4b

4th Milan–San Remo
1992
Vuelta a España

1st Points classification
1st Stages 2a, 4, 11 & 21

Volta a la Comunitat Valenciana

1st Stages 5a & 6

1st Stage 3 Tour of Britain
1993
Tour de France

1st Points classification
1st Stages 3, 18 & 20

Vuelta a España

1st Stages 9, 12 & 20

1st Stage 10 Tour de Suisse
3rd Gent–Wevelgem
4th Overall Three Days of De Panne
1994
1st Memorial Rik Van Steenbergen
1st Polynormande
Tour de France

1st Points classification
1st Stages 1 & 20

Giro d'Italia

1st Points classification
1st Intergiro classification
1st Stage 10

Paris–Nice

1st Stages 3 & 8a

1st Stage 10 Tour DuPont
2nd Overall Three Days of De Panne

1st Stages 1 & 3a

2nd Overall Ronde van Nederland

1st Stages 2 & 4

2nd Classic Haribo
3rd Scheldeprijs
5th Gent–Wevelgem
1995
1st Stage 20 Tour de France
1st Stage 3 Tour DuPont
5th Scheldeprijs
10th Memorial Rik Van Steenbergen
1996
1st Stage 14 Tour de France
1st Stage 2 Tirreno–Adriatico
1st Stage 1 Vuelta a Murcia
1st Stage 2 Giro di Sardegna
3rd Gran Premio Industria e Commercio di Prato
1997
1st La Côte Picarde
1st Stage 7 Four Days of Dunkirk
Critérium du Dauphiné Liberé

1st Stages 1 & 3

== See also ==
- List of sportspeople sanctioned for doping offences
- List of doping cases in cycling
