= List of teams and cyclists in the 1983 Tour de France =

List of cyclists

The Tour organisation wanted to globalize cycling by having cyclists from the Eastern Bloc in the Tour. Due to them only riding as amateurs, the 1983 Tour de France was also opened for amateur teams. In the end, only the Colombian and Portuguese national amateur teams applied for a place, and the Portuguese team later withdrew.

The 1983 Tour started with 140 cyclists, divided into 14 teams of 10 cyclists:

- Coop–Mercier–Mavic
- Renault–Elf–Gitane
- TI–Raleigh–Campagnolo
- Peugeot–Shell–Michelin
- Cilo–Aufina
- Boule d'Or–Colnago–Campagnolo
- J. Aernoudt–Hoonved–Marc Zeep
- La Redoute–Motobécane
- Wolber
- Sem–Mavic–Reydel
- Euro Shop–Mondial Moquette–Splendor
- Metauromobili–Pinarello
- Colombia–Varta
- Reynolds

== Start list ==
=== By team ===
Coop–Mercier–Mavic
No.	Rider	Pos.
1	Joop Zoetemelk (NED)	23
2	Kim Andersen (DEN)	28
3	Pierre Bazzo (FRA)	21
4	Régis Clère (FRA)	HD-14
5	Jean-Louis Gauthier (FRA)	76
6	Michel Laurent (FRA)	AB-17
7	Pierre Le Bigaut (FRA)	32
8	Raymond Martin (FRA)	43
9	Jacques Michaud (FRA)	19
10	Claude Moreau (FRA)	60
Directeur sportif: Jean-Pierre Danguillaume

Renault–Elf–Gitane
No.	Rider	Pos.
11	Bernard Becaas (FRA)	AB-14
12	Charly Bérard (FRA)	56
13	Philippe Chevallier (FRA)	47
14	Lucien Didier (LUX)	52
15	Laurent Fignon (FRA)	1
16	Dominique Gaigne (FRA)	65
17	Pascal Jules (FRA)	61
18	Marc Madiot (FRA)	8
19	Pascal Poisson (FRA)	AB-20
20	Alain Vigneron (FRA)	33
Directeur sportif: Cyrille Guimard

TI–Raleigh–Campagnolo
No.	Rider	Pos.
21	Johan van der Velde (NED)	AB-18
22	Ludo De Keulenaer (BEL)	73
23	Theo de Rooij (NED)	29
24	Johan Lammerts (NED)	72
25	Henk Lubberding (NED)	10
26	Bert Oosterbosch (NED)	AB-13
27	Jan Raas (NED)	AB-4
28	Leo van Vliet (NED)	AB-10
29	Gerard Veldscholten (NED)	27
30	Peter Winnen (NED)	3
Directeur sportif: Peter Post

Peugeot–Shell–Michelin
No.	Rider	Pos.
31	Phil Anderson (AUS)	9
32	Jacques Bossis (FRA)	62
33	Bernard Bourreau (FRA)	53
34	Frédéric Brun (FRA)	78
35	Gilbert Duclos-Lassalle (FRA)	59
36	Dominique Garde (FRA)	40
37	Hubert Linard (FRA)	50
38	Robert Millar (GBR)	14
39	Stephen Roche (IRL)	13
40	Pascal Simon (FRA)	AB-17
Directeur sportif: Roland Berland

Cilo–Aufina
No.	Rider	Pos.
41	Beat Breu (SUI)	22
42	Thierry Bolle (SUI)	AB-18
43	Serge Demierre (SUI)	71
44	Antonio Ferretti (SUI)	31
45	Bernard Gavillet (SUI)	34
46	Gilbert Glaus (SUI)	85
47	Erich Maechler (SUI)	84
48	Marcel Russenberger (SUI)	87
49	Hubert Seiz (SUI)	AB-18
50	Julius Thalmann (SUI)	83
Directeur sportif: Auguste Girard

Boule d'Or–Colnago–Campagnolo
No.	Rider	Pos.
51	Daniel Willems (BEL)	AB-17
52	Roger De Cnijf (BEL)	AB-13
53	Guy Janiszewski (BEL)	77
54	Rudy Matthijs (BEL)	AB-10
55	Noël Segers (BEL)	AB-10
56	Eugène Urbany (LUX)	70
57	Jan van Houwelingen (NED)	80
58	Patrick Vermeulen (BEL)	HD-10
59	Jan Wijnants (BEL)	68
60	Ludwig Wijnants (BEL)	48
Directeur sportif: Willy Jossart

J. Aernoudt–Hoonved–Marc Zeep
No.	Rider	Pos.
61	Hennie Kuiper (NED)	AB-10
62	Marc Dierickx (BEL)	82
63	Nico Emonds (BEL)	AB-13
64	Marcel Laurens (BEL)	88
65	René Martens (BEL)	AB-18
66	Henri Manders (NED)	81
67	Guy Nulens (BEL)	AB-18
68	Rudy Rogiers (BEL)	67
69	Eric Vanderaerden (BEL)	NP-10
70	Adri van der Poel (NED)	37
Directeur sportif: Fred De Bruyne

La Redoute–Motobécane
No.	Rider	Pos.
71	Robert Alban (FRA)	5
72	Laurent Biondi (FRA)	79
73	Johan De Muynck (BEL)	AB-13
74	Etienne De Wilde (BEL)	AB-16
75	Guy Gallopin (FRA)	86
76	Pascal Guyot (FRA)	AB-4
77	Christian Jourdan (FRA)	45
78	Bernard Vallet (FRA)	58
79	Jean-Luc Vandenbroucke (BEL)	25
80	Didier Vanoverschelde (FRA)	35
Directeur sportif: Philippe Crépel

Wolber
No.	Rider	Pos.
81	Jean-René Bernaudeau (FRA)	6
82	Dominique Arnaud (FRA)	26
83	Patrick Bonnet (FRA)	38
84	Marc Durant (FRA)	30
85	Marc Gomez (FRA)	NP-4
86	Graham Jones (GBR)	69
87	Philippe Leleu (FRA)	41
88	Jean-François Rodriguez (FRA)	66
89	Christian Seznec (FRA)	20
90	Claude Vincendeau (FRA)	AB-18
Directeur sportif: Marcel Boishardy

Sem–Mavic–Reydel
No.	Rider	Pos.
91	Joaquim Agostinho (POR)	11
92	René Bittinger (FRA)	AB-10
93	Jonathan Boyer (USA)	12
94	Éric Caritoux (FRA)	24
95	André Chappuis (FRA)	AB-18
96	Patrick Clerc (FRA)	36
97	Éric Dall'Armelina (FRA)	74
98	Jean-Marie Grezet (SUI)	HD-14
99	Sean Kelly (IRL)	7
100	Steven Rooks (NED)	AB-10
Directeur sportif: Jean de Gribaldy

Euro Shop–Mondial Moquette–Splendor
No.	Rider	Pos.
101	Claude Criquielion (BEL)	18
102	Ronny Claes (BEL)	AB-10
103	Hendrik Devos (BEL)	63
104	Rudy Dhaenens (BEL)	HD-10
105	Paul Haghedooren (BEL)	49
106	Eric McKenzie (NZL)	HD-10
107	William Tackaert (BEL)	AB-3
108	Benny Van Brabant (BEL)	AB-16
109	Eric Van De Wiele (BEL)	AB-3
110	Jean-Marie Wampers (BEL)	AB-17
Directeur sportif: Albert de Kimpe

Metauromobili–Pinarello
No.	Rider	Pos.
111	Lucien Van Impe (BEL)	4
112	Pierangelo Bincoletto (ITA)	AB-17
113	Marco Franceschini (ITA)	AB-14
114	Marco Groppo (ITA)	AB-12
115	Louis Luyten (BEL)	AB-4
116	Riccardo Magrini (ITA)	AB-10
117	Nedo Pinori (ITA)	HD-14
118	Frits Pirard (NED)	42
119	Ole Kristian Silseth (NOR)	AB-3
120	Alfio Vandi (ITA)	39
Directeur sportif: Roberto Poggiali

Colombia–Varta
No.	Rider	Pos.
121	Alfonso Flórez Ortiz (COL)	AB-10
122	Samuel Cabrera (COL)	57
123	Fabio Casas (COL)	AB-11
124	Edgar Corredor (COL)	16
125	José Patrocinio Jiménez (COL)	17
126	Cristóbal Pérez (COL)	AB-8
127	José Alfonso López (COL)	64
128	Abelardo Ríos (COL)	44
129	Julio Alberto Rubiano (COL)	AB-11
130	Rafael Tolosa (COL)	AB-5
Directeur sportif: Rubén Darío Gómez

Reynolds
No.	Rider	Pos.
131	Ángel Arroyo (ESP)	2
132	Enrique Aja (ESP)	75
133	Pedro Delgado (ESP)	15
134	Julián Gorospe (ESP)	AB-10
135	Anastasio Greciano (ESP)	51
136	Carlos Hernández Bailo (ESP)	55
137	Jesús Hernández Úbeda (ESP)	54
138	José Luis Laguía (ESP)	AB-10
139	Celestino Prieto (ESP)	46
140	Jaime Vilamajó (ESP)	AB-10
Directeur sportif: José Miguel Echavarri

=== By rider ===
No.	Starting number worn by the rider during the Tour
Pos.	Position in the general classification
Time	Deficit to the winner of the general classification
General classification	Denotes the winner of the general classification
Points classification	Denotes the winner of the points classification
Mountains classification	Denotes the winner of the mountains classification
Young rider classification	Denotes the winner of the young rider classification
Intermediate Sprint classification	Denotes the winner of the intermediate sprints classification
Team classification	Denotes the winner of the team classification
Combativity award	Denotes the winner of the combativity award
DNF	Denotes a rider who did not finish
NP	Denotes a rider who was a non-participant
AB	Denotes a rider who abandoned
HD	Denotes a rider who was outside the time limit (French: Hors Delai)
Age correct as of 1 July 1983, the date on which the Tour began

No.	Name	Nationality	Team	Age	Pos.	Time	Ref
1	Joop Zoetemelk	Netherlands	Coop–Mercier–Mavic	36	23	+ 47' 40"	
2	Kim Andersen	Denmark	Coop–Mercier–Mavic	24	28	+ 1h 02' 58"	
3	Pierre Bazzo	France	Coop–Mercier–Mavic	29	21	+ 40' 34"	
4	Régis Clère	France	Coop–Mercier–Mavic	26	DNF (HD-14)	—	
5	Jean-Louis Gauthier	France	Coop–Mercier–Mavic	27	76	+ 2h 32' 15"	
6	Michel Laurent	France	Coop–Mercier–Mavic	29	DNF (AB-17)	—	
7	Pierre Le Bigaut	France	Coop–Mercier–Mavic	23	32	+ 1h 14' 22"	
8	Raymond Martin	France	Coop–Mercier–Mavic	34	43	+ 1h 40' 25"	
9	Jacques Michaud	France	Coop–Mercier–Mavic	31	19	+ 35' 34"	
10	Claude Moreau	France	Coop–Mercier–Mavic	24	60	+ 2h 06' 10"	
11	Bernard Becaas	France	Renault–Elf–Gitane	28	DNF (AB-14)	—	
12	Charly Bérard	France	Renault–Elf–Gitane	27	56	+ 1h 59' 05"	
13	Philippe Chevallier	France	Renault–Elf–Gitane	22	47	+ 1h 50' 10"	
14	Lucien Didier	Luxembourg	Renault–Elf–Gitane	32	52	+ 1h 54' 45"	
15	Laurent Fignon	France	Renault–Elf–Gitane	22	1	105h 07' 52"	
16	Dominique Gaigne	France	Renault–Elf–Gitane	21	65	+ 2h 09' 58"	
17	Pascal Jules	France	Renault–Elf–Gitane	21	61	+ 2h 06' 29"	
18	Marc Madiot	France	Renault–Elf–Gitane	24	8	+ 14' 55"	
19	Pascal Poisson	France	Renault–Elf–Gitane	25	DNF (AB-20)	—	
20	Alain Vigneron	France	Renault–Elf–Gitane	28	33	+ 1h 18' 13"	
21	Johan van der Velde	Netherlands	TI–Raleigh–Campagnolo	26	DNF (AB-18)	—	
22	Ludo De Keulenaer	Belgium	TI–Raleigh–Campagnolo	23	73	+ 2h 22' 37"	
23	Theo de Rooij	Netherlands	TI–Raleigh–Campagnolo	26	29	+ 1h 05' 41"	
24	Johan Lammerts	Netherlands	TI–Raleigh–Campagnolo	22	72	+ 2h 21' 15"	
25	Henk Lubberding	Netherlands	TI–Raleigh–Campagnolo	29	10	+ 18' 55"	
26	Bert Oosterbosch	Netherlands	TI–Raleigh–Campagnolo	25	DNF (AB-13)	—	
27	Jan Raas	Netherlands	TI–Raleigh–Campagnolo	30	DNF (AB-4)	—	
28	Leo van Vliet	Netherlands	TI–Raleigh–Campagnolo	27	DNF (AB-10)	—	
29	Gerard Veldscholten	Netherlands	TI–Raleigh–Campagnolo	23	27	+ 1h 00' 00"	
30	Peter Winnen	Netherlands	TI–Raleigh–Campagnolo	25	3	+ 4' 09"	
31	Phil Anderson	Australia	Peugeot–Shell–Michelin	25	9	+ 16' 56"	
32	Jacques Bossis	France	Peugeot–Shell–Michelin	30	62	+ 2h 06' 50"	
33	Bernard Bourreau	France	Peugeot–Shell–Michelin	31	53	+ 1h 54' 46"	
34	Frédéric Brun	France	Peugeot–Shell–Michelin	25	78	+ 2h 44' 00"	
35	Gilbert Duclos-Lassalle	France	Peugeot–Shell–Michelin	28	59	+ 2h 05' 18"	
36	Dominique Garde	France	Peugeot–Shell–Michelin	24	40	+ 1h 33' 50"	
37	Hubert Linard	France	Peugeot–Shell–Michelin	30	50	+ 1h 53' 15"	
38	Robert Millar	Great Britain	Peugeot–Shell–Michelin	24	14	+ 23' 29"	
39	Stephen Roche	Ireland	Peugeot–Shell–Michelin	23	13	+ 21' 30"	
40	Pascal Simon	France	Peugeot–Shell–Michelin	26	DNF (AB-17)	—	
41	Beat Breu	Switzerland	Cilo–Aufina	25	22	+ 43' 53"	
42	Thierry Bolle	Switzerland	Cilo–Aufina	30	DNF (AB-18)	—	
43	Serge Demierre	Switzerland	Cilo–Aufina	27	71	+ 2h 19' 33"	
44	Antonio Ferretti	Switzerland	Cilo–Aufina	26	31	+ 1h 11' 33"	
45	Bernard Gavillet	Switzerland	Cilo–Aufina	23	34	+ 1h 21' 06"	
46	Gilbert Glaus	Switzerland	Cilo–Aufina	27	85	+ 3h 33' 56"	
47	Erich Maechler	Switzerland	Cilo–Aufina	22	84	+ 3h 16' 31"	
48	Marcel Russenberger	Switzerland	Cilo–Aufina	24	87	+ 3h 42' 07"	
49	Hubert Seiz	Switzerland	Cilo–Aufina	22	DNF (AB-18)	—	
50	Julius Thalmann	Switzerland	Cilo–Aufina	23	83	+ 3h 01' 48"	
51	Daniel Willems	Belgium	Boule d'Or–Colnago–Campagnolo	26	DNF (AB-17)	—	
52	Roger De Cnijf	Belgium	Boule d'Or–Colnago–Campagnolo	27	DNF (AB-13)	—	
53	Guy Janiszewski	Belgium	Boule d'Or–Colnago–Campagnolo	24	77	+ 2h 35' 19"	
54	Rudy Matthijs	Belgium	Boule d'Or–Colnago–Campagnolo	24	DNF (AB-10)	—	
55	Noël Segers	Belgium	Boule d'Or–Colnago–Campagnolo	23	DNF (AB-10)	—	
56	Eugène Urbany	Luxembourg	Boule d'Or–Colnago–Campagnolo	25	70	+ 2h 16' 43"	
57	Jan van Houwelingen	Netherlands	Boule d'Or–Colnago–Campagnolo	28	80	+ 2h 45' 47"	
58	Patrick Vermeulen	Belgium	Boule d'Or–Colnago–Campagnolo	24	DNF (HD-10)	—	
59	Jan Wijnants	Belgium	Boule d'Or–Colnago–Campagnolo	24	68	+ 2h 10' 53"	
60	Ludwig Wijnants	Belgium	Boule d'Or–Colnago–Campagnolo	26	48	+ 1h 50' 12"	
61	Hennie Kuiper	Netherlands	J. Aernoudt–Hoonved–Marc Zeep	34	DNF (AB-10)	—	
62	Marc Dierickx	Belgium	J. Aernoudt–Hoonved–Marc Zeep	28	82	+ 2h 57' 16"	
63	Nico Emonds	Belgium	J. Aernoudt–Hoonved–Marc Zeep	22	DNF (AB-13)	—	
64	Marcel Laurens	Belgium	J. Aernoudt–Hoonved–Marc Zeep	31	88	+ 4h 02' 46"	
65	René Martens	Belgium	J. Aernoudt–Hoonved–Marc Zeep	28	DNF (AB-18)	—	
66	Henri Manders	Netherlands	J. Aernoudt–Hoonved–Marc Zeep	23	81	+ 2h 56' 46"	
67	Guy Nulens	Belgium	J. Aernoudt–Hoonved–Marc Zeep	25	DNF (AB-18)	—	
68	Rudy Rogiers	Belgium	J. Aernoudt–Hoonved–Marc Zeep	22	67	+ 2h 10' 38"	
69	Eric Vanderaerden	Belgium	J. Aernoudt–Hoonved–Marc Zeep	21	DNF (NP-10)	—	
70	Adri van der Poel	Netherlands	J. Aernoudt–Hoonved–Marc Zeep	24	37	+ 1h 29' 53"	
71	Robert Alban	France	La Redoute–Motobécane	31	5	+ 7' 53"	
72	Laurent Biondi	France	La Redoute–Motobécane	23	79	+ 2h 44' 04"	
73	Johan De Muynck	Belgium	La Redoute–Motobécane	35	DNF (AB-13)	—	
74	Etienne De Wilde	Belgium	La Redoute–Motobécane	25	DNF (AB-16)	—	
75	Guy Gallopin	France	La Redoute–Motobécane	27	86	+ 3h 34' 57"	
76	Pascal Guyot	France	La Redoute–Motobécane	23	DNF (AB-4)	—	
77	Christian Jourdan	France	La Redoute–Motobécane	28	45	+ 1h 42' 45"	
78	Bernard Vallet	France	La Redoute–Motobécane	29	58	+ 2h 04' 02"	
79	Jean-Luc Vandenbroucke	Belgium	La Redoute–Motobécane	28	25	+ 54' 08"	
80	Didier Vanoverschelde	France	La Redoute–Motobécane	31	35	+ 1h 24' 19"	
81	Jean-René Bernaudeau	France	Wolber	26	6	+ 8' 59"	
82	Dominique Arnaud	France	Wolber	27	26	+ 57' 23"	
83	Patrick Bonnet	France	Wolber	25	38	+ 1h 31' 53"	
84	Marc Durant	France	Wolber	28	30	+ 1h 09' 28"	
85	Marc Gomez	France	Wolber	28	DNF (NP-4)	—	
86	Graham Jones	Great Britain	Wolber	25	69	+ 2h 15' 03"	
87	Philippe Leleu	France	Wolber	25	41	+ 1h 34' 08"	
88	Jean-François Rodriguez	France	Wolber	25	66	+ 2h 10' 29"	
89	Christian Seznec	France	Wolber	30	20	+ 39' 49"	
90	Claude Vincendeau	France	Wolber	28	DNF (AB-18)	—	
91	Joaquim Agostinho	Portugal	Sem–Mavic–Reydel	41	11	+ 19' 00"	
92	René Bittinger	France	Sem–Mavic–Reydel	28	DNF (AB-10)	—	
93	Jonathan Boyer	United States	Sem–Mavic–Reydel	27	12	+ 19' 57"	
94	Éric Caritoux	France	Sem–Mavic–Reydel	22	24	+ 52' 56"	
95	André Chappuis	France	Sem–Mavic–Reydel	27	DNF (AB-18)	—	
96	Patrick Clerc	France	Sem–Mavic–Reydel	25	36	+ 1h 25' 40"	
97	Éric Dall'Armelina	France	Sem–Mavic–Reydel	23	74	+ 2h 25' 54"	
98	Jean-Marie Grezet	Switzerland	Sem–Mavic–Reydel	24	DNF (HD-14)	—	
99	Sean Kelly	Ireland	Sem–Mavic–Reydel	27	7	+ 12' 09"	
100	Steven Rooks	Netherlands	Sem–Mavic–Reydel	22	DNF (AB-10)	—	
101	Claude Criquielion	Belgium	Euro Shop–Mondial Moquette–Splendor	26	18	+ 33' 29"	
102	Ronny Claes	Belgium	Euro Shop–Mondial Moquette–Splendor	25	DNF (AB-10)	—	
103	Hendrik Devos	Belgium	Euro Shop–Mondial Moquette–Splendor	27	63	+ 2h 07' 46"	
104	Rudy Dhaenens	Belgium	Euro Shop–Mondial Moquette–Splendor	22	DNF (HD-10)	—	
105	Paul Haghedooren	Belgium	Euro Shop–Mondial Moquette–Splendor	23	49	+ 1h 51' 17"	
106	Eric McKenzie	New Zealand	Euro Shop–Mondial Moquette–Splendor	24	DNF (HD-10)	—	
107	William Tackaert	Belgium	Euro Shop–Mondial Moquette–Splendor	26	DNF (AB-3)	—	
108	Benny Van Brabant	Belgium	Euro Shop–Mondial Moquette–Splendor	24	DNF (AB-16)	—	
109	Eric Van De Wiele	Belgium	Euro Shop–Mondial Moquette–Splendor	30	DNF (AB-3)	—	
110	Jean-Marie Wampers	Belgium	Euro Shop–Mondial Moquette–Splendor	24	DNF (AB-17)	—	
111	Lucien Van Impe	Belgium	Metauromobili–Pinarello	36	4	+ 4' 16"	
112	Pierangelo Bincoletto	Italy	Metauromobili–Pinarello	24	DNF (AB-17)	—	
113	Marco Franceschini	Italy	Metauromobili–Pinarello	23	DNF (AB-14)	—	
114	Marco Groppo	Italy	Metauromobili–Pinarello	22	DNF (AB-12)	—	
115	Louis Luyten	Belgium	Metauromobili–Pinarello	28	DNF (AB-4)	—	
116	Riccardo Magrini	Italy	Metauromobili–Pinarello	28	DNF (AB-10)	—	
117	Nedo Pinori	Italy	Metauromobili–Pinarello	22	DNF (HD-14)	—	
118	Frits Pirard	Netherlands	Metauromobili–Pinarello	28	42	+ 1h 39' 22"	
119	Ole Kristian Silseth	Norway	Metauromobili–Pinarello	23	DNF (AB-3)	—	
120	Alfio Vandi	Italy	Metauromobili–Pinarello	27	39	+ 1h 32' 59"	
121	Alfonso Flórez Ortiz	Colombia	Colombia–Varta	30	DNF (AB-10)	—	
122	Samuel Cabrera	Colombia	Colombia–Varta	22	57	+ 2h 03' 48"	
123	Fabio Casas	Colombia	Colombia–Varta	24	DNF (AB-11)	—	
124	Edgar Corredor	Colombia	Colombia–Varta	23	16	+ 26' 08"	
125	José Patrocinio Jiménez	Colombia	Colombia–Varta	30	17	+ 28' 05"	
126	Cristóbal Pérez	Colombia	Colombia–Varta	30	DNF (AB-8)	—	
127	José Alfonso López	Colombia	Colombia–Varta	31	64	+ 2h 09' 42"	
128	Abelardo Ríos	Colombia	Colombia–Varta	31	44	+ 1h 40' 59"	
129	Julio Alberto Rubiano	Colombia	Colombia–Varta	29	DNF (AB-11)	—	
130	Rafael Tolosa	Colombia	Colombia–Varta	24	DNF (AB-5)	—	
131	Ángel Arroyo	Spain	Reynolds	26	2	+ 4' 04"	
132	Enrique Aja	Spain	Reynolds	23	75	+ 2h 29' 49"	
133	Pedro Delgado	Spain	Reynolds	23	15	+ 25' 44"	
134	Julián Gorospe	Spain	Reynolds	23	DNF (AB-10)	—	
135	Anastasio Greciano	Spain	Reynolds	31	51	+ 1h 53' 52"	
136	Carlos Hernández Bailo	Spain	Reynolds	24	55	+ 1h 58' 46"	
137	Jesús Hernández Úbeda	Spain	Reynolds	23	54	+ 1h 58' 39"	
138	José Luis Laguía	Spain	Reynolds	23	DNF (AB-10)	—	
139	Celestino Prieto	Spain	Reynolds	22	46	+ 1h 46' 08"	
140	Jaime Vilamajó	Spain	Reynolds	23	DNF (AB-10)	—	

=== By nationality ===
The 140 riders that competed in the 1983 Tour de France represented 16 different countries. Riders from eight countries won stages during the race; French riders won the largest number of stages.

Country	No. of riders	Finishers	Stage wins
Australia	1	1	
Belgium	30	12	3 (Eric Vanderaerden, Rudy Matthijs, Lucien Van Impe)
Colombia	10	5	
Denmark	1	1	1 (Kim Andersen)
France	45	35	8 (Dominique Gaigne, Philippe Chevallier, Régis Clère, Pierre Le Bigaut, Michel Laurent, Jacques Michaud, Philippe Leleu, Laurent Fignon)
Ireland	2	2	
Italy	6	1	1 (Riccardo Magrini)
Luxembourg	2	2	
Netherlands	16	10	5 (Frits Pirard, Bert Oosterbosch ×2, Henk Lubberding, Peter Winnen)
New Zealand	1	0	
Norway	1	0	
Portugal	1	1	
Spain	10	7	1 (Ángel Arroyo)
Switzerland	11	8	2 (Serge Demierre, Gilbert Glaus)
Great Britain	2	2	1 (Robert Millar)
United States	1	1	
Total	140	88	22 (Note: The team time trial on stage 2, won by Coop–Mercier–Mavic, is not counted in this total.)
