= 1983 Tour de France, Prologue to Stage 11 =

Cycling race stages

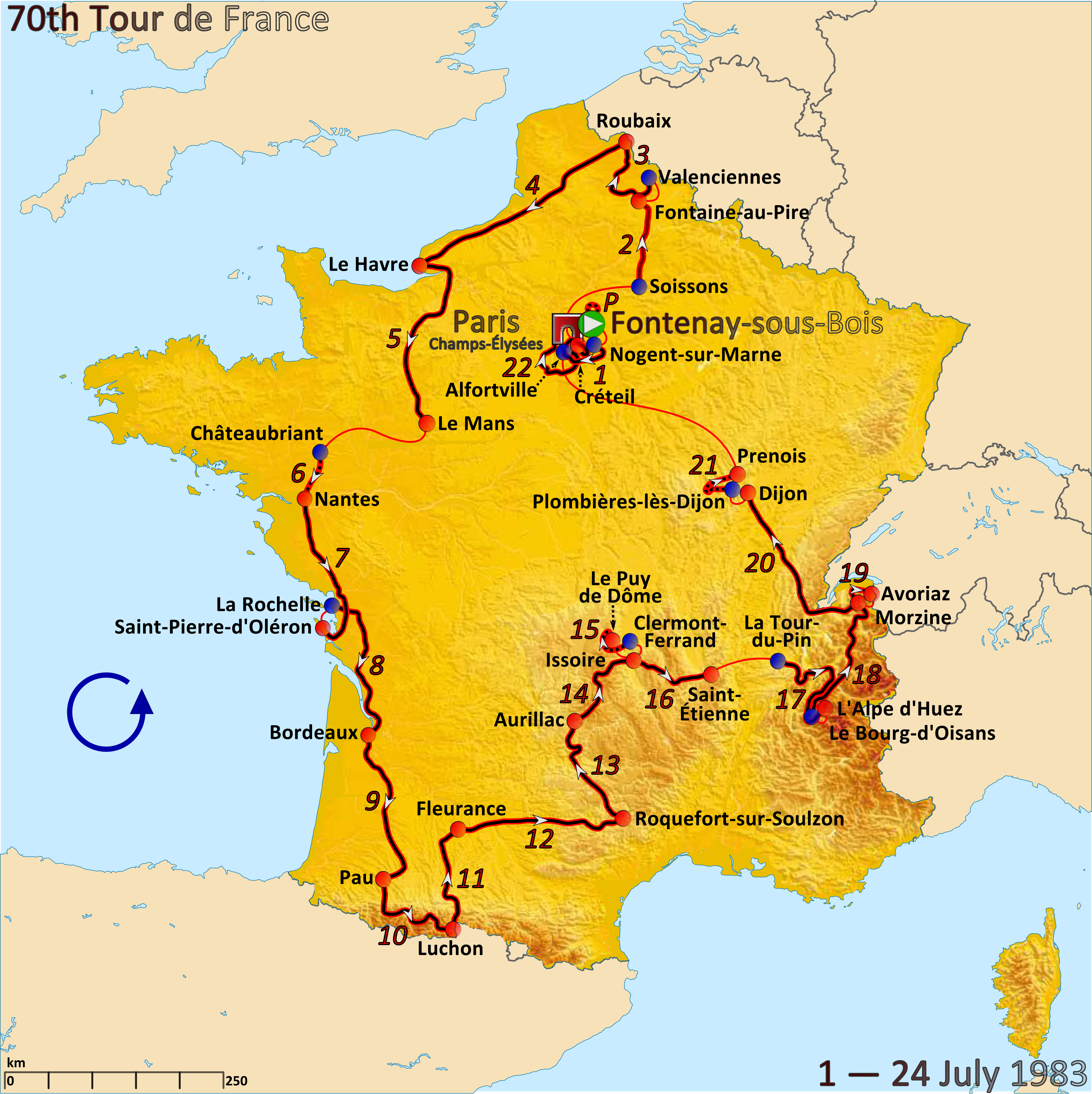
Route of the 1983 Tour de France

The 1983 Tour de France was the 70th edition of Tour de France, one of cycling's Grand Tours. The Tour began in Fontenay-sous-Bois with a prologue individual time trial on 1 July and Stage 11 occurred on 12 July with a flat stage to Fleurance. The race finished on the Champs-Élysées in Paris on 24 July.

== Prologue ==
1 July 1983 — Fontenay-sous-Bois, 5.5 km (3.4 mi) (ITT)

Prologue result and general classification after prologue

Rank	Rider	Team	Time
1	Eric Vanderaerden (BEL)	J. Aernoudt–Hoonved–Marc Zeep	7' 01"
2	Bert Oosterbosch (NED)	TI–Raleigh–Campagnolo	+ 2"
3	Jean-Luc Vandenbroucke (BEL)	La Redoute–Motobécane	+ 4"
4	Kim Andersen (DEN)	Coop–Mercier–Mavic	+ 6"
5	Joop Zoetemelk (NED)	Coop–Mercier–Mavic	s.t.
6	Stephen Roche (IRL)	Peugeot–Shell–Michelin	s.t.
7	Phil Anderson (AUS)	Peugeot–Shell–Michelin	+ 10"
8	Régis Clère (FRA)	Coop–Mercier–Mavic	s.t.
9	Pascal Poisson (FRA)	Renault–Elf–Gitane	+ 11"
10	Gilbert Duclos-Lassalle (FRA)	Peugeot–Shell–Michelin	+ 12 "

== Stage 1 ==
2 July 1983 – Nogent-sur-Marne to Créteil, 163 km (101.3 mi)

Stage 1 result

Rank	Rider	Team	Time
1	Frits Pirard (NED)	Metauromobili–Pinarello	3h 49' 38"
2	Jean-Louis Gauthier (FRA)	Coop–Mercier–Mavic	s.t.
3	Pascal Jules (FRA)	Renault–Elf–Gitane	s.t.
4	Patrick Bonnet (FRA)	Wolber	s.t.
5	Benny Van Brabant (BEL)	Euro Shop–Mondial Moquette–Splendor	s.t.
6	Etienne De Wilde (BEL)	La Redoute–Motobécane	s.t.
7	Didier Vanoverschelde (FRA)	La Redoute–Motobécane	s.t.
8	Guy Gallopin (FRA)	La Redoute–Motobécane	s.t.
9	Johan van der Velde (NED)	TI–Raleigh–Campagnolo	s.t.
10	Roger De Cnijf (BEL)	Boule d'Or–Colnago–Campagnolo	s.t.

General classification after stage 1

Rank	Rider	Team	Time
1	Eric Vanderaerden (BEL)	J. Aernoudt–Hoonved–Marc Zeep	3h 56' 07"
2	Sean Kelly (IRL)	Sem–Mavic–Reydel	+ 21"
3	Bert Oosterbosch (NED)	TI–Raleigh–Campagnolo	+ 26"
4	Phil Anderson (AUS)	Peugeot–Shell–Michelin	s.t.
5	Johan van der Velde (NED)	TI–Raleigh–Campagnolo	+ 32"
6	Frits Pirard (NED)	Metauromobili–Pinarello	+ 36"
7	Jean-Louis Gauthier (FRA)	Coop–Mercier–Mavic	s.t.
8	Jean-Luc Vandenbroucke (BEL)	La Redoute–Motobécane	s.t.
9	Joop Zoetemelk (NED)	Coop–Mercier–Mavic	+ 38"
10	Stephen Roche (IRL)	Peugeot–Shell–Michelin	s.t.

== Stage 2 ==
3 July 1983 — Soissons to Fontaine-au-Pire, 100 km (62.1 mi) (TTT)

Stage 2 result

Rank	Team	Time
1	Coop–Mercier–Mavic	2h 18' 59"
2	Peugeot–Shell–Michelin	+ 17"
3	J. Aernoudt–Hoonved–Marc Zeep	s.t.
4	TI–Raleigh–Campagnolo	+ 43"
5	Wolber	+ 2' 11"
6	Sem–Mavic–Reydel	+ 2' 16"
7	Renault–Elf–Gitane	+ 2' 25"
8	La Redoute–Motobécane	+ 4' 24"
9	Cilo–Aufina	+ 4' 28"
10	Reynolds	+ 5' 50"

General classification after stage 2

Rank	Rider	Team	Time
1	Jean-Louis Gauthier (FRA)	Coop–Mercier–Mavic	3h 52' 58"
2	Joop Zoetemelk (NED)	Coop–Mercier–Mavic	+ 2"
3	Pierre Le Bigaut (FRA)	Coop–Mercier–Mavic	+ 4"
4	Kim Andersen (DEN)	Coop–Mercier–Mavic	+ 6"
5	Régis Clère (FRA)	Coop–Mercier–Mavic	s.t.
6	Jacques Michaud (FRA)	Coop–Mercier–Mavic	+ 8"
7	Claude Moreau (FRA)	Coop–Mercier–Mavic	+ 16"
8	Michel Laurent (FRA)	Coop–Mercier–Mavic	+ 19"
9	Pierre Bazzo (FRA)	Coop–Mercier–Mavic	+ 25"
10	Raymond Martin (FRA)	Coop–Mercier–Mavic	s.t.

== Stage 3 ==
4 July 1983 — Valenciennes to Roubaix, 149.5 km (92.9 mi)

Stage 3 result

Rank	Rider	Team	Time
1	Rudy Matthijs (BEL)	Boule d'Or–Colnago–Campagnolo	3h 46' 06"
2	Kim Andersen (DEN)	Coop–Mercier–Mavic	s.t.
3	Pascal Poisson (FRA)	Renault–Elf–Gitane	+ 2' 09"
4	Sean Kelly (IRL)	Sem–Mavic–Reydel	s.t.
5	Eric Vanderaerden (BEL)	J. Aernoudt–Hoonved–Marc Zeep	+ 3' 40"
6	Johan van der Velde (FRA)	TI–Raleigh–Campagnolo	s.t.
7	Jan Wijnants (NED)	Boule d'Or–Colnago–Campagnolo	s.t.
8	Jean-Luc Vandenbroucke (BEL)	La Redoute–Motobécane	s.t.
9	Didier Vanoverschelde (FRA)	La Redoute–Motobécane	s.t.
10	Charly Bérard (FRA)	Renault–Elf–Gitane	s.t.

General classification after stage 3

Rank	Rider	Team	Time
1	Kim Andersen (DEN)	Coop–Mercier–Mavic	7h 39' 10"
2	Joop Zoetemelk (NED)	Coop–Mercier–Mavic	+ 2' 05"
3	Claude Moreau (FRA)	Coop–Mercier–Mavic	+ 2' 19"
4	Phil Anderson (AUS)	Peugeot–Shell–Michelin	+ 2' 38"
5	Eric Vanderaerden (BEL)	J. Aernoudt–Hoonved–Marc Zeep	+ 2' 42"
6	Stephen Roche (IRL)	Peugeot–Shell–Michelin	+ 2' 50"
7	Gilbert Duclos-Lassalle (FRA)	Peugeot–Shell–Michelin	+ 2' 56"
8	Jacques Bossis (FRA)	Peugeot–Shell–Michelin	+ 3' 05"
9	Pascal Simon (FRA)	Peugeot–Shell–Michelin	+ 3' 08"
10	Bernard Bourreau (FRA)	Peugeot–Shell–Michelin	+ 3' 18"

== Stage 4 ==
5 July 1983 — Roubaix to Le Havre, 299 km (186 mi)

Stage 4 result

Rank	Rider	Team	Time
1	Serge Demierre (BEL)	Boule d'Or–Colnago–Campagnolo	7h 58' 11"
2	Sean Kelly (IRL)	Sem–Mavic–Reydel	s.t.
3	Eric McKenzie (NZL)	Euro Shop–Mondial Moquette–Splendor	s.t.
4	Benny Van Brabant (BEL)	Euro Shop–Mondial Moquette–Splendor	s.t.
5	Etienne De Wilde (BEL)	La Redoute–Motobécane	s.t.
6	Eric Vanderaerden (BEL)	J. Aernoudt–Hoonved–Marc Zeep	s.t.
7	Johan van der Velde (NED)	TI–Raleigh–Campagnolo	s.t.
8	Pascal Poisson (FRA)	Renault–Elf–Gitane	s.t.
9	Jean-Luc Vandenbroucke (BEL)	La Redoute–Motobécane	s.t.
10	Phil Anderson (AUS)	Peugeot–Shell–Michelin	s.t.

General classification after stage 4

Rank	Rider	Team	Time
1	Kim Andersen (DEN)	Coop–Mercier–Mavic	15h 42' 11"
2	Eric Vanderaerden (BEL)	J. Aernoudt–Hoonved–Marc Zeep	+ 1' 54"
3	Joop Zoetemelk (NED)	Coop–Mercier–Mavic	+ 2' 05"
4	Claude Moreau (FRA)	Coop–Mercier–Mavic	+ 2' 19"
5	Phil Anderson (AUS)	Peugeot–Shell–Michelin	+ 2' 34"
6	Gilbert Duclos-Lassalle (FRA)	Peugeot–Shell–Michelin	+ 2' 44"
7	Stephen Roche (IRL)	Peugeot–Shell–Michelin	+ 3' 00"
8	Jacques Bossis (FRA)	Peugeot–Shell–Michelin	+ 3' 05"
9	Pascal Simon (FRA)	Peugeot–Shell–Michelin	+ 3' 08"
10	Sean Kelly (IRL)	Sem–Mavic–Reydel	s.t.

== Stage 5 ==
6 July 1983 — Le Havre to Le Mans, 254 km (158 mi)

Stage 5 result

Rank	Rider	Team	Time
1	Dominique Gaigne (FRA)	Renault–Elf–Gitane	7h 09' 53"
2	Gilbert Glaus (SUI)	Cilo–Aufina	+ 9"
3	Etienne De Wilde (BEL)	La Redoute–Motobécane	s.t.
4	Sean Kelly (IRL)	Sem–Mavic–Reydel	s.t.
5	Eric Vanderaerden (BEL)	J. Aernoudt–Hoonved–Marc Zeep	s.t.
6	Johan van der Velde (FRA)	TI–Raleigh–Campagnolo	s.t.
7	Henri Manders (NED)	J. Aernoudt–Hoonved–Marc Zeep	s.t.
8	Johan Lammerts (FRA)	TI–Raleigh–Campagnolo	s.t.
9	Benny Van Brabant (BEL)	Euro Shop–Mondial Moquette–Splendor	s.t.
10	Frits Pirard (NED)	Metauromobili–Pinarello	s.t.

General classification after stage 5

Rank	Rider	Team	Time
1	Kim Andersen (DEN)	Coop–Mercier–Mavic	22h 52' 13"
2	Eric Vanderaerden (BEL)	J. Aernoudt–Hoonved–Marc Zeep	+ 1' 50"
3	Joop Zoetemelk (NED)	Coop–Mercier–Mavic	+ 2' 05"
4	Phil Anderson (AUS)	Peugeot–Shell–Michelin	+ 2' 06"
5	Claude Moreau (FRA)	Coop–Mercier–Mavic	+ 2' 07"
6	Gilbert Duclos-Lassalle (FRA)	Peugeot–Shell–Michelin	+ 2' 44"
7	Sean Kelly (IRL)	Sem–Mavic–Reydel	+ 2' 59"
8	Stephen Roche (IRL)	Peugeot–Shell–Michelin	+ 3' 00"
9	Jacques Bossis (FRA)	Peugeot–Shell–Michelin	+ 3' 05"
10	Pascal Simon (FRA)	Peugeot–Shell–Michelin	+ 3' 08"

== Stage 6 ==
7 July 1983 — Châteaubriant to Nantes, 58 km (36 mi) (ITT)

Stage 6 result

Rank	Rider	Team	Time
1	Bert Oosterbosch (NED)	TI–Raleigh–Campagnolo	1h 18' 34"
2	Daniel Willems (BEL)	Boule d'Or–Colnago–Campagnolo	+ 45"
3	Julián Gorospe (ESP)	Reynolds	+ 1' 07"
4	Jean-Luc Vandenbroucke (BEL)	La Redoute–Motobécane	+ 1' 08"
5	Jean-Marie Grezet (SUI)	Sem–Mavic–Reydel	+ 1' 28"
6	Sean Kelly (IRL)	Sem–Mavic–Reydel	+ 1' 29"
7	Joaquim Agostinho (POR)	Sem–Mavic–Reydel	+ 2' 02"
8	Phil Anderson (AUS)	Peugeot–Shell–Michelin	+ 2' 07"
9	Jan van Houwelingen (NED)	Boule d'Or–Colnago–Campagnolo	+ 2' 12"
10	Adri van der Poel (NED)	J. Aernoudt–Hoonved–Marc Zeep	+ 2' 37"

General classification after stage 6

Rank	Rider	Team	Time
1	Kim Andersen (DEN)	Coop–Mercier–Mavic	24h 14' 18"
2	Phil Anderson (AUS)	Peugeot–Shell–Michelin	+ 42"
3	Sean Kelly (IRL)	Sem–Mavic–Reydel	+ 57"
4	Joop Zoetemelk (NED)	Coop–Mercier–Mavic	+ 1' 19"
5	Eric Vanderaerden (BEL)	J. Aernoudt–Hoonved–Marc Zeep	+ 2' 01"
6	Jean-Luc Vandenbroucke (BEL)	La Redoute–Motobécane	+ 2' 05"
7	Stephen Roche (IRL)	Peugeot–Shell–Michelin	+ 2' 09"
8	Adri van der Poel (NED)	J. Aernoudt–Hoonved–Marc Zeep	+ 2' 25"
9	Pascal Simon (FRA)	Peugeot–Shell–Michelin	+ 2' 40"
10	Claude Moreau (FRA)	Coop–Mercier–Mavic	+ 2' 41"

== Stage 7 ==
8 July 1983 — Nantes to Île d'Oléron, 211 km (131 mi)

Stage 7 result

Rank	Rider	Team	Time
1	Riccardo Magrini (ITA)	Metauromobili–Pinarello	5h 45' 37"
2	Eric Vanderaerden (BEL)	J. Aernoudt–Hoonved–Marc Zeep	s.t.
3	Gilbert Glaus (SUI)	Cilo–Aufina	s.t.
4	Etienne De Wilde (BEL)	La Redoute–Motobécane	s.t.
5	Sean Kelly (IRL)	Sem–Mavic–Reydel	s.t.
6	Jan Wijnants (BEL)	Boule d'Or–Colnago–Campagnolo	s.t.
7	Benny Van Brabant (BEL)	Euro Shop–Mondial Moquette–Splendor	s.t.
8	Johan van der Velde (NED)	TI–Raleigh–Campagnolo	s.t.
9	Adri van der Poel (NED)	J. Aernoudt–Hoonved–Marc Zeep	s.t.
10	Eric McKenzie (NZL)	Euro Shop–Mondial Moquette–Splendor	s.t.

General classification after stage 7

Rank	Rider	Team	Time
1	Kim Andersen (DEN)	Coop–Mercier–Mavic	29h 59' 55"
2	Phil Anderson (AUS)	Peugeot–Shell–Michelin	+ 38"
3	Sean Kelly (IRL)	Sem–Mavic–Reydel	+ 45"
4	Joop Zoetemelk (NED)	Coop–Mercier–Mavic	+ 1' 19"
5	Eric Vanderaerden (BEL)	J. Aernoudt–Hoonved–Marc Zeep	+ 1' 41"
6	Jean-Luc Vandenbroucke (BEL)	La Redoute–Motobécane	+ 2' 05"
7	Stephen Roche (IRL)	Peugeot–Shell–Michelin	+ 2' 09"
8	Adri van der Poel (NED)	J. Aernoudt–Hoonved–Marc Zeep	+ 2' 25"
9	Pascal Simon (FRA)	Peugeot–Shell–Michelin	+ 2' 40"
10	Claude Moreau (FRA)	Coop–Mercier–Mavic	+ 2' 41"

== Stage 8 ==
9 July 1983 — La Rochelle to Bordeaux, 219.5 km (136.4 mi)

Stage 8 result

Rank	Rider	Team	Time
1	Bert Oosterbosch (NED)	TI–Raleigh–Campagnolo	6h 16' 00"
2	Hennie Kuiper (NED)	J. Aernoudt–Hoonved–Marc Zeep	+ 1"
3	Jean-René Bernaudeau (FRA)	Wolber	+ 1' 14"
4	Eric McKenzie (NZL)	Euro Shop–Mondial Moquette–Splendor	+ 1' 17"
5	Sean Kelly (IRL)	Sem–Mavic–Reydel	s.t.
6	Etienne De Wilde (BEL)	La Redoute–Motobécane	s.t.
7	Benny Van Brabant (BEL)	Euro Shop–Mondial Moquette–Splendor	s.t.
8	Daniel Willems (BEL)	Boule d'Or–Colnago–Campagnolo	s.t.
9	Johan van der Velde (NED)	TI–Raleigh–Campagnolo	s.t.
10	Adri van der Poel (NED)	J. Aernoudt–Hoonved–Marc Zeep	s.t.

General classification after stage 8

Rank	Rider	Team	Time
1	Kim Andersen (DEN)	Coop–Mercier–Mavic	36h 17' 12"
2	Sean Kelly (IRL)	Sem–Mavic–Reydel	+ 25"
3	Phil Anderson (AUS)	Peugeot–Shell–Michelin	+ 34"
4	Joop Zoetemelk (NED)	Coop–Mercier–Mavic	+ 1' 19"
5	Eric Vanderaerden (BEL)	J. Aernoudt–Hoonved–Marc Zeep	+ 1' 41"
6	Jean-Luc Vandenbroucke (BEL)	La Redoute–Motobécane	+ 2' 05"
7	Stephen Roche (IRL)	Peugeot–Shell–Michelin	+ 2' 09"
8	Hennie Kuiper (NED)	J. Aernoudt–Hoonved–Marc Zeep	+ 2' 22"
9	Adri van der Poel (NED)	J. Aernoudt–Hoonved–Marc Zeep	+ 2' 25"
10	Pascal Simon (FRA)	Peugeot–Shell–Michelin	+ 2' 40"

== Stage 9 ==
10 July 1983 — Bordeaux to Pau, 203 km (126 mi)

Stage 9 result

Rank	Rider	Team	Time
1	Philippe Chevallier (FRA)	Renault–Elf–Gitane	5h 46' 42"
2	Gerard Veldscholten (NED)	TI–Raleigh–Campagnolo	+ 2' 37"
3	Sean Kelly (IRL)	Sem–Mavic–Reydel	+ 2' 49"
4	Etienne De Wilde (BEL)	La Redoute–Motobécane	s.t.
5	Johan van der Velde (NED)	TI–Raleigh–Campagnolo	s.t.
6	Benny Van Brabant (BEL)	Euro Shop–Mondial Moquette–Splendor	s.t.
7	Frits Pirard (NED)	Metauromobili–Pinarello	s.t.
8	Steven Rooks (NED)	Sem–Mavic–Reydel	s.t.
9	Hennie Kuiper (NED)	J. Aernoudt–Hoonved–Marc Zeep	s.t.
10	Pierangelo Bincoletto (ITA)	Metauromobili–Pinarello	s.t.

General classification after stage 9

Rank	Rider	Team	Time
1	Sean Kelly (IRL)	Sem–Mavic–Reydel	42h 06' 38"
2	Kim Andersen (DEN)	Coop–Mercier–Mavic	+ 1"
3	Phil Anderson (AUS)	Peugeot–Shell–Michelin	+ 39"
4	Joop Zoetemelk (NED)	Coop–Mercier–Mavic	+ 1' 24"
5	Jean-Luc Vandenbroucke (BEL)	La Redoute–Motobécane	+ 2' 10"
6	Stephen Roche (IRL)	Peugeot–Shell–Michelin	+ 2' 14"
7	Hennie Kuiper (NED)	J. Aernoudt–Hoonved–Marc Zeep	+ 2' 27"
8	Pascal Simon (FRA)	Peugeot–Shell–Michelin	+ 2' 45"
9	Claude Moreau (FRA)	Coop–Mercier–Mavic	+ 2' 46"
10	Daniel Willems (BEL)	Boule d'Or–Colnago–Campagnolo	+ 2' 47"

== Stage 10 ==
11 July 1983 — Pau to Bagnères-de-Luchon, 198 km (123 mi)

Stage 10 result

Rank	Rider	Team	Time
1	Robert Millar (GBR)	Peugeot–Shell–Michelin	6h 23' 27"
2	Pedro Delgado (ESP)	Reynolds	+ 6"
3	Pascal Simon (FRA)	Peugeot–Shell–Michelin	+ 1' 13"
4	José Patrocinio Jiménez (COL)	Colombia–Varta	+ 1' 30"
5	Edgar Corredor (COL)	Colombia–Varta	+ 3' 40"
6	Jean-René Bernaudeau (FRA)	Wolber	+ 4' 06"
7	Laurent Fignon (FRA)	Renault–Elf–Gitane	+ 4' 23"
8	Jacques Michaud (FRA)	Coop–Mercier–Mavic	+ 5' 45"
9	Marc Madiot (FRA)	Renault–Elf–Gitane	s.t.
10	Robert Alban (FRA)	La Redoute–Motobécane	s.t.

General classification after stage 10

Rank	Rider	Team	Time
1	Pascal Simon (FRA)	Peugeot–Shell–Michelin	48h 34' 03"
2	Laurent Fignon (FRA)	Renault–Elf–Gitane	+ 4' 22"
3	Jean-René Bernaudeau (FRA)	Wolber	+ 5' 34"
4	Sean Kelly (IRL)	Sem–Mavic–Reydel	+ 6' 13"
5	Joop Zoetemelk (NED)	Coop–Mercier–Mavic	+ 6' 21"
6	Jacques Michaud (FRA)	Coop–Mercier–Mavic	+ 7' 16"
7	Marc Madiot (FRA)	Renault–Elf–Gitane	+ 7' 36"
8	Pedro Delgado (ESP)	Reynolds	+ 9' 09"
9	Robert Alban (FRA)	La Redoute–Motobécane	s.t.
10	Phil Anderson (AUS)	Peugeot–Shell–Michelin	+ 9' 22"

== Stage 11 ==
12 July 1983 — Bagnères-de-Luchon to Fleurance, 176 km (109 mi)

Stage 11 result

Rank	Rider	Team	Time
1	Régis Clère (FRA)	Coop–Mercier–Mavic	4h 27' 06"
2	Christian Jourdan (FRA)	La Redoute–Motobécane	+ 3"
3	Frits Pirard (NED)	Metauromobili–Pinarello	+ 5"
4	Ludwig Wijnants (BEL)	Boule d'Or–Colnago–Campagnolo	+ 25"
5	Michel Laurent (FRA)	Coop–Mercier–Mavic	+ 28"
6	Adri van der Poel (NED)	J. Aernoudt–Hoonved–Marc Zeep	+ 33"
7	Serge Demierre (SUI)	Cilo–Aufina	s.t.
8	Henk Lubberding (NED)	TI–Raleigh–Campagnolo	s.t.
9	Pierre Bazzo (FRA)	Coop–Mercier–Mavic	s.t.
10	Pedro Delgado (ESP)	Reynolds	s.t.

General classification after stage 11

Rank	Rider	Team	Time
1	Pascal Simon (FRA)	Peugeot–Shell–Michelin	53h 03' 15"
2	Laurent Fignon (FRA)	Renault–Elf–Gitane	+ 4' 22"
3	Jean-René Bernaudeau (FRA)	Wolber	+ 5' 34"
4	Sean Kelly (IRL)	Sem–Mavic–Reydel	+ 5' 57"
5	Joop Zoetemelk (NED)	Coop–Mercier–Mavic	+ 6' 21"
6	Jacques Michaud (FRA)	Coop–Mercier–Mavic	+ 7' 16"
7	Pedro Delgado (ESP)	Reynolds	+ 7' 32"
8	Marc Madiot (FRA)	Renault–Elf–Gitane	+ 7' 36"
9	Robert Alban (FRA)	La Redoute–Motobécane	+ 9' 09"
10	Phil Anderson (AUS)	Peugeot–Shell–Michelin	+ 9' 19"
