= 1983 Tour de France, Stage 12 to Stage 22 =

Cycling race stages

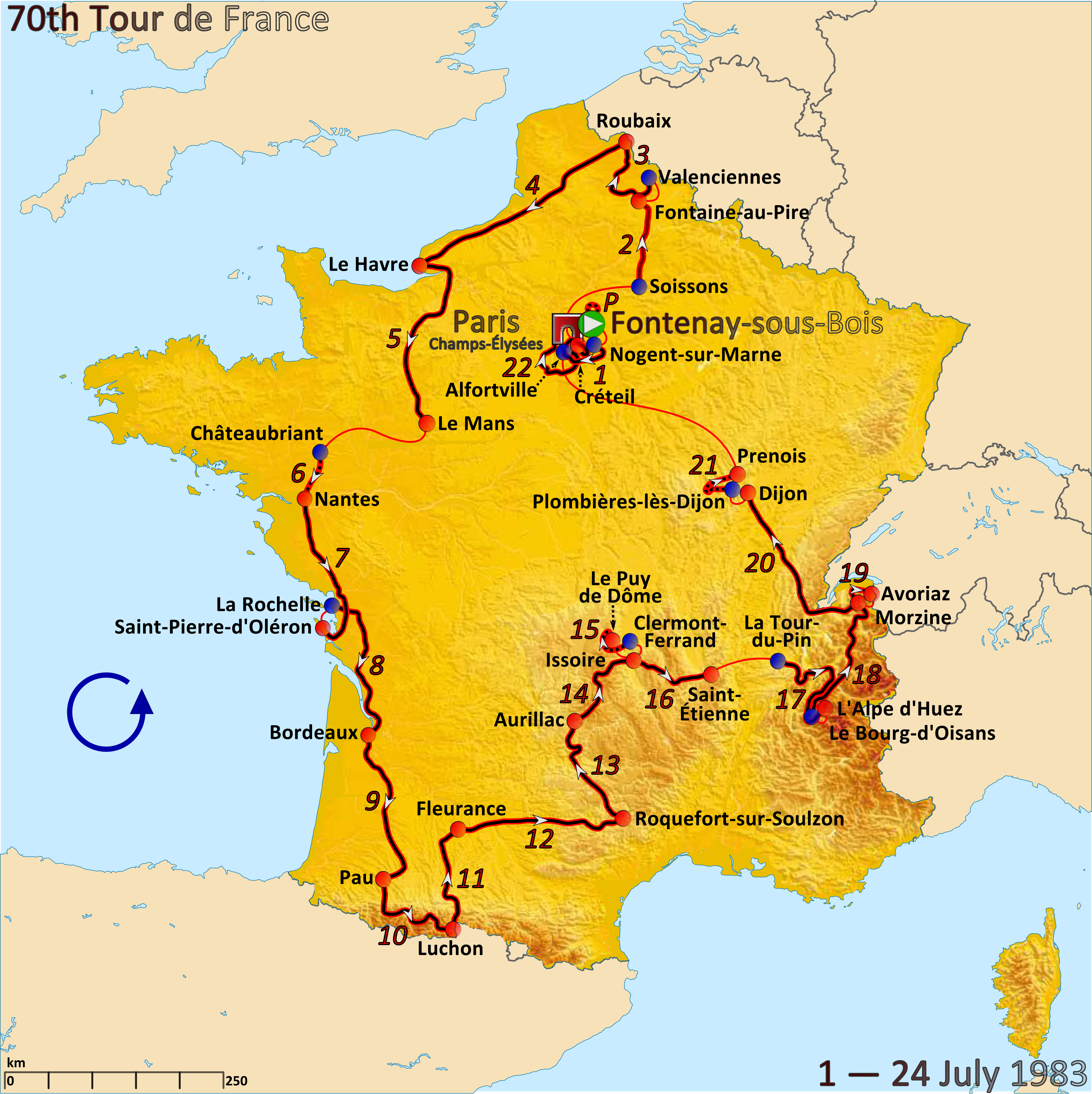
Route of the 1983 Tour de France

The 1983 Tour de France was the 70th edition of Tour de France, one of cycling's Grand Tours. The Tour began in Fontenay-sous-Bois with a prologue individual time trial on 1 July and Stage 12 occurred on 12 July with a flat stage from Fleurance. The race finished on the Champs-Élysées in Paris on 24 July.

== Stage 12 ==
13 July 1983 — Fleurance to Roquefort-sur-Soulzon, 254 km (157.8 mi)

Stage 12 result

Rank	Rider	Team	Time
1	Kim Andersen (DEN)	Coop–Mercier–Mavic	7h 17' 49"
2	Pedro Delgado (ESP)	Reynolds	+ 1"
3	Gerard Veldscholten (NED)	TI–Raleigh–Campagnolo	+ 9"
4	Pascal Poisson (FRA)	Renault–Elf–Gitane	+ 25"
5	Joaquim Agostinho (POR)	Sem–Mavic–Reydel	+ 29"
6	Sean Kelly (IRL)	Sem–Mavic–Reydel	+ 31"
7	Laurent Fignon (FRA)	Renault–Elf–Gitane	s.t.
8	Phil Anderson (AUS)	Peugeot–Shell–Michelin	s.t.
9	Jean-René Bernaudeau (FRA)	Wolber	s.t.
10	Peter Winnen (NED)	TI–Raleigh–Campagnolo	s.t.

General classification after stage 12

Rank	Rider	Team	Time
1	Pascal Simon (FRA)	Peugeot–Shell–Michelin	60h 21' 35"
2	Laurent Fignon (FRA)	Renault–Elf–Gitane	+ 4' 14"
3	Sean Kelly (IRL)	Sem–Mavic–Reydel	+ 5' 33"
4	Jean-René Bernaudeau (FRA)	Wolber	+ 5' 34"
5	Pedro Delgado (ESP)	Reynolds	+ 6' 42"
6	Jacques Michaud (FRA)	Coop–Mercier–Mavic	+ 7' 16"
7	Marc Madiot (FRA)	Renault–Elf–Gitane	+ 7' 28"
8	Robert Alban (FRA)	La Redoute–Motobécane	+ 9' 09"
9	Joaquim Agostinho (POR)	Sem–Mavic–Reydel	+ 9' 19"
10	Phil Anderson (AUS)	Peugeot–Shell–Michelin	s.t.

== Stage 13 ==
14 July 1983 — Roquefort-sur-Soulzon to Aurillac, 200.5 km (124.6 mi)

Stage 13 result

Rank	Rider	Team	Time
1	Henk Lubberding (NED)	TI–Raleigh–Campagnolo	6h 00' 06"
2	Hubert Linard (FRA)	Reynolds	+ 30"
3	Régis Clère (FRA)	Coop–Mercier–Mavic	+ 34"
4	Johan Lammerts (NED)	TI–Raleigh–Campagnolo	+ 7' 26"
5	Philippe Leleu (FRA)	Wolber	s.t.
6	Adri van der Poel (NED)	J. Aernoudt–Hoonved–Marc Zeep	s.t.
7	Lucien Didier (LUX)	Renault–Elf–Gitane	s.t.
8	Didier Vanoverschelde (FRA)	La Redoute–Motobécane	s.t.
9	Jan Wijnants (BEL)	Boule d'Or–Colnago–Campagnolo	s.t.
10	Pierre Bazzo (FRA)	Coop–Mercier–Mavic	s.t.

General classification after stage 13

Rank	Rider	Team	Time
1	Pascal Simon (FRA)	Peugeot–Shell–Michelin	66h 34' 25"
2	Laurent Fignon (FRA)	Renault–Elf–Gitane	+ 4' 14"
3	Sean Kelly (IRL)	Sem–Mavic–Reydel	+ 5' 33"
4	Jean-René Bernaudeau (FRA)	Wolber	+ 5' 34"
5	Pedro Delgado (ESP)	Reynolds	+ 6' 42"
6	Jacques Michaud (FRA)	Coop–Mercier–Mavic	+ 7' 16"
7	Marc Madiot (FRA)	Renault–Elf–Gitane	+ 7' 28"
8	Robert Alban (FRA)	La Redoute–Motobécane	+ 9' 09"
9	Joaquim Agostinho (POR)	Sem–Mavic–Reydel	+ 9' 19"
10	Phil Anderson (AUS)	Peugeot–Shell–Michelin	s.t.

== Stage 14 ==
15 July 1983 — Aurillac to Issoire, 147 km (91 mi)

Stage 14 result

Rank	Rider	Team	Time
1	Pierre Le Bigaut (FRA)	Coop–Mercier–Mavic	3h 39' 16"
2	Theo de Rooij (NED)	TI–Raleigh–Campagnolo	+ 6' 14"
3	Dominique Arnaud (FRA)	Wolber	+ 6' 16"
4	Carlos Hernández Bailo (ESP)	Reynolds	+ 6' 21"
5	Charly Bérard (FRA)	Renault–Elf–Gitane	s.t.
6	Pierre Bazzo (FRA)	Coop–Mercier–Mavic	s.t.
7	Robert Millar (GBR)	Peugeot–Shell–Michelin	+ 6' 24"
8	Kim Andersen (DEN)	Coop–Mercier–Mavic	+ 7' 07"
9	Adri van der Poel (NED)	J. Aernoudt–Hoonved–Marc Zeep	+ 7' 08"
10	Bernard Gavillet (SUI)	Cilo–Aufina	s.t.

General classification after stage 14

Rank	Rider	Team	Time
1	Pascal Simon (FRA)	Peugeot–Shell–Michelin	70h 21' 02"
2	Laurent Fignon (FRA)	Renault–Elf–Gitane	+ 4' 14"
3	Sean Kelly (IRL)	Sem–Mavic–Reydel	+ 5' 29"
4	Jean-René Bernaudeau (FRA)	Wolber	+ 5' 34"
5	Pedro Delgado (ESP)	Reynolds	+ 6' 42"
6	Jacques Michaud (FRA)	Coop–Mercier–Mavic	+ 7' 16"
7	Marc Madiot (FRA)	Renault–Elf–Gitane	+ 7' 28"
8	Robert Alban (FRA)	La Redoute–Motobécane	+ 9' 09"
9	Phil Anderson (AUS)	Peugeot–Shell–Michelin	+ 9' 11"
10	Joaquim Agostinho (POR)	Sem–Mavic–Reydel	+ 9' 19"

== Stage 15 ==
16 July 1983 — Clermont-Ferrand to Puy de Dôme, 15.6 km (9.7 mi) (ITT)

Stage 15 result

Rank	Rider	Team	Time
1	Ángel Arroyo (ESP)	Reynolds	40' 43"
2	Pedro Delgado (ESP)	Reynolds	+ 13"
3	José Patrocinio Jiménez (COL)	Colombia–Varta	+ 29"
4	Lucien Van Impe (BEL)	Metauromobili–Pinarello	+ 30"
5	Michel Laurent (FRA)	Coop–Mercier–Mavic	+ 42"
6	Edgar Corredor (COL)	Colombia–Varta	+ 1' 09"
7	Sean Kelly (IRL)	Sem–Mavic–Reydel	+ 1' 10"
8	Peter Winnen (NED)	TI–Raleigh–Campagnolo	+ 1' 10"
9	Johan van der Velde (NED)	TI–Raleigh–Campagnolo	+ 1' 15"
10	Laurent Fignon (FRA)	Renault–Elf–Gitane	+ 1' 48"

General classification after stage 15

Rank	Rider	Team	Time
1	Pascal Simon (FRA)	Peugeot–Shell–Michelin	71h 06' 55"
2	Laurent Fignon (FRA)	Renault–Elf–Gitane	+ 52"
3	Sean Kelly (IRL)	Sem–Mavic–Reydel	+ 1' 29"
4	Pedro Delgado (ESP)	Reynolds	+ 1' 45"
5	Ángel Arroyo (ESP)	Reynolds	+ 4' 24"
6	Marc Madiot (FRA)	Renault–Elf–Gitane	+ 4' 30"
7	Jean-René Bernaudeau (FRA)	Wolber	+ 5' 20"
8	Johan van der Velde (NED)	TI–Raleigh–Campagnolo	+ 6' 04"
9	Joaquim Agostinho (POR)	Sem–Mavic–Reydel	+ 6' 12"
10	Peter Winnen (NED)	TI–Raleigh–Campagnolo	+ 6' 18"

== Stage 16 ==
17 July 1983 — Issoire to Saint-Étienne, 144.5 km (89.8 mi)

Stage 16 result

Rank	Rider	Team	Time
1	Michel Laurent (FRA)	Coop–Mercier–Mavic	3h 49' 38"
2	Henk Lubberding (NED)	TI–Raleigh–Campagnolo	(Note: Michel Laurent was forced into the barriers by Lubberding and crashed. The judges awarded Laurent the victory and downgraded Lubberding.) s.t.
3	Jean-Luc Vandenbroucke (BEL)	La Redoute–Motobécane	+ 1' 07"
4	Christian Seznec (FRA)	Wolber	s.t.
5	Pascal Poisson (FRA)	Renault–Elf–Gitane	+ 1' 08"
6	Gerard Veldscholten (NED)	TI–Raleigh–Campagnolo	s.t.
7	Pierre Bazzo (FRA)	Coop–Mercier–Mavic	+ 1' 10"
8	Christian Jourdan (FRA)	La Redoute–Motobécane	+ 5' 27"
9	Jan van Houwelingen (NED)	Boule d'Or–Colnago–Campagnolo	+ 5' 28"
10	Marc Durant (FRA)	Wolber	+ 6' 21"

General classification after stage 16

Rank	Rider	Team	Time
1	Pascal Simon (FRA)	Peugeot–Shell–Michelin	75h 03' 06"
2	Laurent Fignon (FRA)	Renault–Elf–Gitane	+ 40"
3	Sean Kelly (IRL)	Sem–Mavic–Reydel	+ 1' 21"
4	Pedro Delgado (ESP)	Reynolds	+ 1' 45"
5	Ángel Arroyo (ESP)	Reynolds	+ 4' 24"
6	Marc Madiot (FRA)	Renault–Elf–Gitane	+ 4' 30"
7	Henk Lubberding (NED)	TI–Raleigh–Campagnolo	+ 4' 54"
8	Jean-René Bernaudeau (FRA)	Wolber	+ 5' 20"
9	Johan van der Velde (NED)	TI–Raleigh–Campagnolo	+ 6' 00"
10	Joaquim Agostinho (POR)	Sem–Mavic–Reydel	+ 6' 12"

== Stage 17 ==
18 July 1983 — La Tour-du-Pin to Alpe d'Huez, 223.5 km (138.9 mi)

Stage 17 result

Rank	Rider	Team	Time
1	Peter Winnen (NED)	TI–Raleigh–Campagnolo	7h 21' 32"
2	Jean-René Bernaudeau (FRA)	Wolber	s.t.
3	Edgar Corredor (COL)	Colombia–Varta	+ 57"
4	Robert Alban (FRA)	La Redoute–Motobécane	+ 1' 22"
5	Laurent Fignon (FRA)	Renault–Elf–Gitane	+ 2' 07"
6	Lucien Van Impe (BEL)	Metauromobili–Pinarello	+ 2' 09"
7	Pedro Delgado (ESP)	Reynolds	+ 2' 10"
8	Raymond Martin (FRA)	Coop–Mercier–Mavic	+ 2' 42"
9	José Patrocinio Jiménez (COL)	Colombia–Varta	+ 3' 05"
10	Gerard Veldscholten (NED)	TI–Raleigh–Campagnolo	+ 3' 07"

General classification after stage 17

Rank	Rider	Team	Time
1	Laurent Fignon (FRA)	Renault–Elf–Gitane	82h 27' 28"
2	Pedro Delgado (ESP)	Reynolds	+ 1' 08"
3	Jean-René Bernaudeau (FRA)	Wolber	+ 2' 33"
4	Peter Winnen (NED)	TI–Raleigh–Campagnolo	+ 3' 31"
5	Sean Kelly (IRL)	Sem–Mavic–Reydel	+ 4' 20"
6	Marc Madiot (FRA)	Renault–Elf–Gitane	+ 4' 52"
7	Robert Alban (FRA)	La Redoute–Motobécane	+ 5' 00"
8	Lucien Van Impe (BEL)	Metauromobili–Pinarello	+ 5' 58"
9	Ángel Arroyo (ESP)	Reynolds	+ 6' 26"
10	Henk Lubberding (NED)	TI–Raleigh–Campagnolo	+ 10' 02"

== Stage 18 ==
20 July 1983 — Le Bourg-d'Oisans to Morzine, 247.5 km (153.8 mi)

Stage 18 result

Rank	Rider	Team	Time
1	Jacques Michaud (FRA)	Coop–Mercier–Mavic	7h 45' 25"
2	Ángel Arroyo (ESP)	Reynolds	+ 1' 11"
3	Edgar Corredor (COL)	Colombia–Varta	+ 2' 15"
4	Lucien Van Impe (BEL)	Metauromobili–Pinarello	+ 2' 16"
5	Robert Alban (FRA)	La Redoute–Motobécane	+ 2' 19"
6	Stephen Roche (IRL)	Peugeot–Shell–Michelin	+ 2' 48"
7	Robert Millar (GBR)	Peugeot–Shell–Michelin	s.t.
8	Laurent Fignon (FRA)	Renault–Elf–Gitane	+ 3' 42"
9	Peter Winnen (NED)	TI–Raleigh–Campagnolo	s.t.
10	Jean-René Bernaudeau (FRA)	Wolber	+ 4' 11"

General classification after stage 18

Rank	Rider	Team	Time
1	Laurent Fignon (FRA)	Renault–Elf–Gitane	90h 16' 32"
2	Jean-René Bernaudeau (FRA)	Wolber	+ 3' 02"
3	Peter Winnen (NED)	TI–Raleigh–Campagnolo	+ 3' 31"
4	Robert Alban (FRA)	La Redoute–Motobécane	+ 3' 37"
5	Ángel Arroyo (ESP)	Reynolds	+ 3' 55"
6	Lucien Van Impe (BEL)	Metauromobili–Pinarello	+ 4' 32"
7	Marc Madiot (FRA)	Renault–Elf–Gitane	+ 9' 12"
8	Sean Kelly (IRL)	Sem–Mavic–Reydel	+ 10' 20"
9	Jonathan Boyer (USA)	Sem–Mavic–Reydel	+ 12' 54"
10	Phil Anderson (AUS)	Peugeot–Shell–Michelin	+ 15' 00"

== Stage 19 ==
21 July 1983 — Morzine to Avoriaz, 15 km (9.3 mi) (ITT)

Stage 19 result

Rank	Rider	Team	Time
1	Lucien Van Impe (BEL)	Metauromobili–Pinarello	35' 09"
2	Stephen Roche (IRL)	Peugeot–Shell–Michelin	+ 36"
3	Peter Winnen (NED)	TI–Raleigh–Campagnolo	+ 49"
4	Ángel Arroyo (ESP)	Reynolds	+ 55"
5	Bernard Gavillet (SUI)	Cilo–Aufina	+ 1' 19"
6	Joaquim Agostinho (POR)	Sem–Mavic–Reydel	+ 1' 28"
7	Pedro Delgado (ESP)	Reynolds	+ 1' 37"
8	José Patrocinio Jiménez (COL)	Colombia–Varta	s.t.
9	Edgar Corredor (COL)	Colombia–Varta	+ 1' 44"
10	Laurent Fignon (FRA)	Renault–Elf–Gitane	+ 1' 45"

General classification after stage 19

Rank	Rider	Team	Time
1	Laurent Fignon (FRA)	Renault–Elf–Gitane	90h 53' 25"
2	Peter Winnen (NED)	TI–Raleigh–Campagnolo	+ 2' 35"
3	Lucien Van Impe (BEL)	Metauromobili–Pinarello	+ 2' 48"
4	Ángel Arroyo (ESP)	Reynolds	+ 3' 05"
5	Robert Alban (FRA)	La Redoute–Motobécane	+ 4' 11"
6	Jean-René Bernaudeau (FRA)	Wolber	+ 4' 52"
7	Sean Kelly (IRL)	Sem–Mavic–Reydel	+ 10' 37"
8	Marc Madiot (FRA)	Renault–Elf–Gitane	+ 11' 10"
9	Jonathan Boyer (USA)	Sem–Mavic–Reydel	+ 14' 57"
10	Phil Anderson (AUS)	Peugeot–Shell–Michelin	+ 15' 19"

== Stage 20 ==
22 July 1983 — Morzine to Dijon, 282 km (175 mi)

Stage 20 result

Rank	Rider	Team	Time
1	Philippe Leleu (FRA)	Wolber	7h 22' 56"
2	Jean-Louis Gauthier (FRA)	Coop–Mercier–Mavic	+ 9' 17"
3	Sean Kelly (IRL)	Sem–Mavic–Reydel	+ 9' 21"
4	Gilbert Glaus (SUI)	Cilo–Aufina	s.t.
5	Adri van der Poel (NED)	J. Aernoudt–Hoonved–Marc Zeep	s.t.
6	Frits Pirard (NED)	Metauromobili–Pinarello	s.t.
7	Henri Manders (NED)	J. Aernoudt–Hoonved–Marc Zeep	s.t.
8	Ludwig Wijnants (BEL)	Boule d'Or–Colnago–Campagnolo	s.t.
9	Laurent Fignon (FRA)	Renault–Elf–Gitane	s.t.
10	Didier Vanoverschelde (FRA)	La Redoute–Motobécane	s.t.

General classification after stage 20

Rank	Rider	Team	Time
1	Laurent Fignon (FRA)	Renault–Elf–Gitane	98h 25' 18"
2	Peter Winnen (NED)	TI–Raleigh–Campagnolo	+ 2' 59"
3	Lucien Van Impe (BEL)	Metauromobili–Pinarello	+ 3' 08"
4	Ángel Arroyo (ESP)	Reynolds	+ 3' 29"
5	Robert Alban (FRA)	La Redoute–Motobécane	+ 4' 35"
6	Jean-René Bernaudeau (FRA)	Wolber	+ 5' 16"
7	Sean Kelly (IRL)	Sem–Mavic–Reydel	+ 10' 11"
8	Marc Madiot (FRA)	Renault–Elf–Gitane	+ 11' 34"
9	Jonathan Boyer (USA)	Sem–Mavic–Reydel	+ 15' 21"
10	Phil Anderson (AUS)	Peugeot–Shell–Michelin	+ 15' 43"

== Stage 21 ==
23 July 1983 — Dijon to Dijon, 50 km (31 mi) (ITT)

Stage 21 result

Rank	Rider	Team	Time
1	Laurent Fignon (FRA)	Renault–Elf–Gitane	1h 11' 37"
2	Ángel Arroyo (ESP)	Reynolds	+ 35"
3	Stephen Roche (IRL)	Peugeot–Shell–Michelin	+ 37"
4	Lucien Van Impe (BEL)	Metauromobili–Pinarello	+ 1' 08"
5	Peter Winnen (NED)	TI–Raleigh–Campagnolo	+ 1' 10"
6	Phil Anderson (AUS)	Peugeot–Shell–Michelin	+ 1' 13"
7	Joaquim Agostinho (POR)	Sem–Mavic–Reydel	+ 1' 15"
8	Adri van der Poel (NED)	J. Aernoudt–Hoonved–Marc Zeep	+ 1' 21"
9	Claude Criquielion (BEL)	Euro Shop–Mondial Moquette–Splendor	+ 1' 49"
10	Sean Kelly (IRL)	Sem–Mavic–Reydel	+ 1' 59"

General classification after stage 21

Rank	Rider	Team	Time
1	Laurent Fignon (FRA)	Renault–Elf–Gitane	99h 36' 55"
2	Ángel Arroyo (ESP)	Reynolds	+ 4' 04"
3	Peter Winnen (NED)	TI–Raleigh–Campagnolo	+ 4' 09"
4	Lucien Van Impe (BEL)	Metauromobili–Pinarello	+ 4' 16"
5	Robert Alban (FRA)	La Redoute–Motobécane	+ 7' 53"
6	Jean-René Bernaudeau (FRA)	Wolber	+ 8' 59"
7	Sean Kelly (IRL)	Sem–Mavic–Reydel	+ 12' 10"
8	Marc Madiot (FRA)	Renault–Elf–Gitane	+ 14' 55"
9	Phil Anderson (AUS)	Peugeot–Shell–Michelin	+ 16' 56"
10	Henk Lubberding (NED)	TI–Raleigh–Campagnolo	+ 18' 55"

== Stage 22 ==
24 July 1983 — Alfortville to Paris Champs-Élysées, 195 km (121 mi)

Stage 22 result

Rank	Rider	Team	Time
1	Gilbert Glaus (SUI)	Cilo–Aufina	5h 30' 56"
2	Sean Kelly (IRL)	Sem–Mavic–Reydel	s.t.
3	Eugène Urbany (LUX)	Boule d'Or–Colnago–Campagnolo	+ 1"
4	Laurent Fignon (FRA)	Renault–Elf–Gitane	s.t.
5	Guy Gallopin (FRA)	La Redoute–Motobécane	s.t.
6	Phil Anderson (AUS)	Peugeot–Shell–Michelin	s.t.
7	Laurent Biondi (FRA)	La Redoute–Motobécane	s.t.
8	Patrick Bonnet (FRA)	Wolber	s.t.
9	Didier Vanoverschelde (FRA)	La Redoute–Motobécane	s.t.
10	Dominique Gaigne (FRA)	Renault–Elf–Gitane	s.t.

General classification after stage 22

Rank	Rider	Team	Time
1	Laurent Fignon (FRA)	Renault–Elf–Gitane	105h 07' 52"
2	Ángel Arroyo (ESP)	Reynolds	+ 4' 04"
3	Peter Winnen (NED)	TI–Raleigh–Campagnolo	+ 4' 09"
4	Lucien Van Impe (BEL)	Metauromobili–Pinarello	+ 4' 16"
5	Robert Alban (FRA)	La Redoute–Motobécane	+ 7' 53"
6	Jean-René Bernaudeau (FRA)	Wolber	+ 8' 59"
7	Sean Kelly (IRL)	Sem–Mavic–Reydel	+ 12' 09"
8	Marc Madiot (FRA)	Renault–Elf–Gitane	+ 14' 55"
9	Phil Anderson (AUS)	Peugeot–Shell–Michelin	+ 16' 56"
10	Henk Lubberding (NED)	TI–Raleigh–Campagnolo	+ 18' 55"
