= 1983 Tour de France =

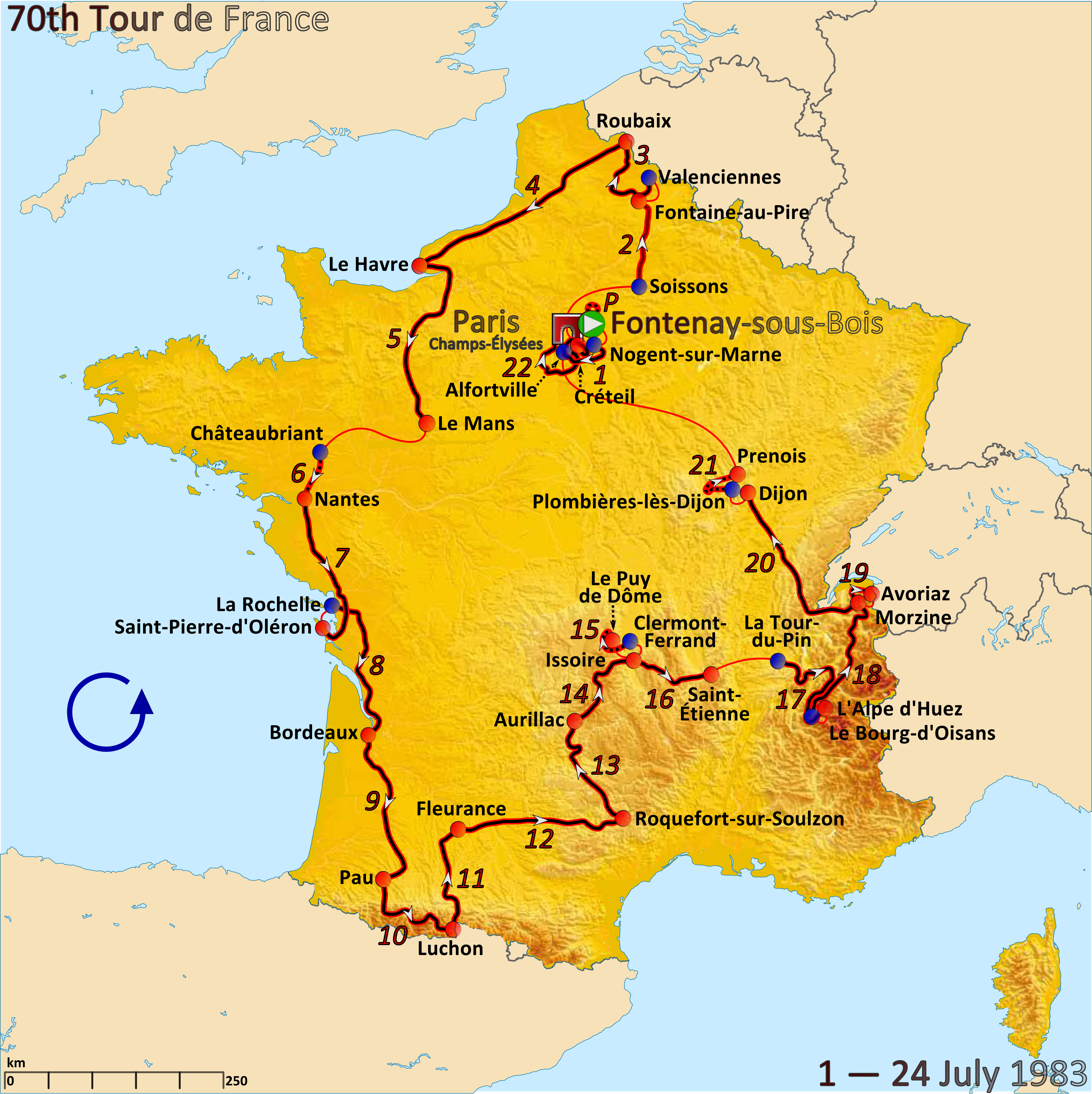
- Route of the 1983 Tour de France

Race details
- Dates: 1–24 July 1983
- Stages: 22 + Prologue
- Distance: 3,809 km (2,367 mi)
- Winning time: 105h 07' 52"

Results
Jersey awarded to the overall winner	Winner	Laurent Fignon (FRA)	(Renault–Elf)
	Second	Ángel Arroyo (ESP)	(Reynolds)
	Third	Peter Winnen (NED)	(TI–Raleigh)
Jersey awarded to the points classification winner	Points	Sean Kelly (IRE)	(Sem–Reydel–Mavic)
Jersey awarded to the mountains classification winner	Mountains	Lucien Van Impe (BEL)	(Metauro Mobili–Pinarello)
Jersey awarded to the young rider classification winner	Young rider	Laurent Fignon (FRA)	(Renault–Elf)
	Combination	Laurent Fignon (FRA)	(Renault–Elf)
	Sprints	Sean Kelly (IRE)	(Sem–Reydel–Mavic)
	Combativity	Serge Demierre (SUI)	(Cilo–Aufina)
	Team	TI–Raleigh–Campagnolo	
	Team points	TI–Raleigh–Campagnolo	

The 1983 Tour de France was the 70th edition of the Tour de France, run from 1 to 24 July, with 22 stages and a prologue covering a total distance of 3,809 km (2,367 mi). The race was won by French rider Laurent Fignon. Sean Kelly of Ireland won the points classification, and Lucien Van Impe of Belgium won the mountains classification.

== Teams ==
The Tour organisation wanted to globalize cycling by having cyclist from the Eastern Bloc in the Tour. Because they only rode as amateurs, the 1983 Tour was also opened for amateur teams. In the end, only the Colombian and Portuguese national amateur teams applied for a place, and the Portuguese team later withdrew. The 1983 Tour started with 140 cyclists, divided into 14 teams of 10 cyclists.

The teams entering the race were:

- COOP–Mercier–Mavic
- Renault–Elf
- TI–Raleigh–Campagnolo
- Peugeot–Shell–Michelin
- Cilo–Aufina
- Boule d'Or–Colnago
- Jacky Aernoudt–Rossin–Campagnolo
- La Redoute–Motobécane
- Wolber–Spidel
- Sem–Reydel–Mavic
- Splendor–Euro Shop
- Metauro Mobili–Pinarello
- Varta–Colombia
- Reynolds

The amateur teams were allowed to ride with a co-sponsor, and the Colombian team had Varta as co-sponsor. This angered the Bianchi–Piaggio team, and although they were invited to compete, they refused to come.

== Route and stages ==
The 1983 Tour de France started on 1 July, and had one rest day, after the finish on the Alpe d'Huez. The highest point of elevation in the race was 2,115 m (6,939 ft) at the summit of the Col du Tourmalet mountain pass on stage 10.

Stage characteristics and winners
Stage	Date	Course	Distance	Type	Winner
P	1 July	Fontenay-sous-Bois	6 km (3.7 mi)	Individual time trial	Eric Vanderaerden (BEL)
1	2 July	Nogent-sur-Marne to Créteil	163 km (101 mi)	Plain stage	Frits Pirard (NED)
2	3 July	Soissons to Fontaine-au-Pire	100 km (62 mi)	Team time trial	(France) COOP–Mercier–Mavic
3	4 July	Valenciennes to Roubaix	152 km (94 mi)	Hilly stage	Rudy Matthijs (BEL)
4	5 July	Roubaix to Le Havre	300 km (190 mi)	Plain stage	Serge Demierre (SUI)
5	6 July	Le Havre to Le Mans	257 km (160 mi)	Plain stage	Dominique Gaigne (FRA)
6	7 July	Châteaubriant to Nantes	58 km (36 mi)	Individual time trial	Bert Oosterbosch (NED)
7	8 July	Nantes to Île d'Oléron	216 km (134 mi)	Plain stage	Riccardo Magrini (ITA)
8	9 July	La Rochelle to Bordeaux	222 km (138 mi)	Plain stage	Bert Oosterbosch (NED)
9	10 July	Bordeaux to Pau	207 km (129 mi)	Plain stage	Philippe Chevallier (FRA)
10	11 July	Pau to Bagnères-de-Luchon	201 km (125 mi)	Stage with mountain(s)	Robert Millar (GBR)
11	12 July	Bagnères-de-Luchon to Fleurance	177 km (110 mi)	Plain stage	Régis Clère (FRA)
12	13 July	Fleurance to Roquefort-sur-Soulzon	261 km (162 mi)	Plain stage	Kim Andersen (DEN)
13	14 July	Roquefort-sur-Soulzon to Aurillac	210 km (130 mi)	Hilly stage	Henk Lubberding (NED)
14	15 July	Aurillac to Issoire	149 km (93 mi)	Hilly stage	Pierre Le Bigaut (FRA)
15	16 July	Clermont-Ferrand to Puy-de-Dôme	16 km (9.9 mi)	Individual time trial	Ángel Arroyo (ESP)
16	17 July	Issoire to Saint-Étienne	144 km (89 mi)	Hilly stage	Michel Laurent (FRA)
17	18 July	La Tour-du-Pin to Alpe d'Huez	223 km (139 mi)	Stage with mountain(s)	Peter Winnen (NED)
	19 July	Alpe d'Huez		Rest day	
18	20 July	Le Bourg-d'Oisans to Morzine	247 km (153 mi)	Stage with mountain(s)	Jacques Michaud (FRA)
19	21 July	Morzine to Avoriaz	15 km (9.3 mi)	Individual time trial	Lucien Van Impe (BEL)
20	22 July	Morzine to Dijon	291 km (181 mi)	Plain stage	Philippe Leleu (FRA)
21	23 July	Dijon	50 km (31 mi)	Individual time trial	Laurent Fignon (FRA)
22	24 July	Alfortville to Paris (Champs-Élysées)	195 km (121 mi)	Plain stage	Gilbert Glaus (SUI)
	Total		3,809 km (2,367 mi)		

== Race overview ==
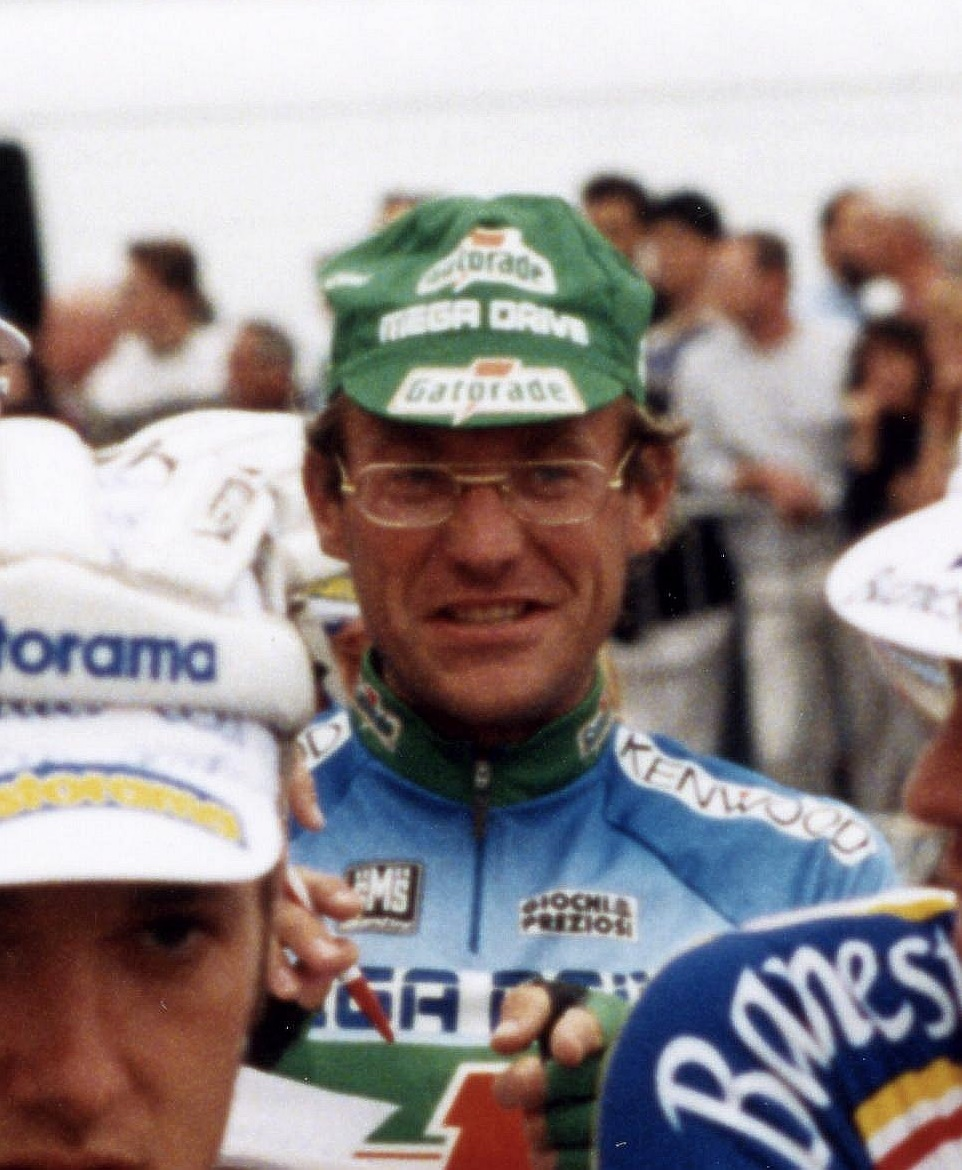
Laurent Fignon (pictured at the 1993 Tour), winner of the general classification

In 1983, Fignon was a part of the team that helped Bernard Hinault to win the 1983 Vuelta a España. Guimard did not want to send Fignon to the Tour de France, because two Grand Tours could be too much for a 22-year-old rider. When Hinault, winner of four of five previous Tours, announced that he would not start due to injury, the Renault team was without a team captain. Fignon was added to the 1983 Tour de France selection for the Renault team, and the team decided to go for stage wins, with hopes of having Fignon or Marc Madiot compete for the young rider classification. After stage nine, the first mountain stage, Fignon was in second place, behind Pascal Simon, and he was allowed to be team leader. In the eleventh stage, Simon crashed and broke his shoulder blade. Simon continued, and only lost little time the next stages. In the fifteenth stage, a mountain time trial, Fignon was able to win back so much time that he was within one minute of Simon.

In the seventeenth stage, Simon had to give up, and Fignon became the new leader. In the next stages, Fignon was able to answer all attacks from his opponents, and he even won the time trial in the 21st stage. At 22 years old, Fignon was the youngest man to win the Tour since 1933.

Fignon later said that he was lucky to have won the 1983 Tour: if Hinault would have been present, Fignon would have helped Hinault, as Hinault was the team leader.

== Classification leadership and minor prizes ==
There were several classifications in the 1983 Tour de France, four of them awarding jerseys to their leaders. The most important was the general classification, calculated by adding each cyclist's finishing times on each stage. The cyclist with the least accumulated time was the race leader, identified by the yellow jersey; the winner of this classification is considered the winner of the Tour.

Additionally, there was a points classification, where cyclists got points for finishing among the best in a stage finish, or in intermediate sprints. The cyclist with the most points lead the classification, and was identified with a green jersey.

There was also a mountains classification. The organisation had categorised some climbs as either hors catégorie, first, second, third, or fourth-category; points for this classification were won by the first cyclists that reached the top of these climbs first, with more points available for the higher-categorised climbs. The cyclist with the most points lead the classification, and wore a white jersey with red polka dots.

Another classification was the young rider classification. This was decided the same way as the general classification, but only riders that rode the Tour for the first time were eligible, and the leader wore a white jersey.

The fifth individual classification was the intermediate sprints classification. This classification had similar rules as the points classification, but only points were awarded on intermediate sprints. In 1983, this classification had no associated jersey.

The team classification changed; in 1982 it was calculated with the times of the best four cyclists in every stage, and in 1983 this changed to the times of the best three cyclists. The riders in the team that led this classification were identified by yellow caps. There was also a team points classification. Cyclists received points according to their finishing position on each stage, with the first rider receiving one point. The first three finishers of each team had their points combined, and the team with the fewest points led the classification. The riders of the team leading this classification wore green caps.

In addition, there was a combativity award given after each mass-start stage to the cyclist considered most combative. The decision was made by a jury composed of journalists who gave points. The cyclist with the most points from votes in all stages led the combativity classification. Serge Demierre won this classification, and was given overall the super-combativity award. The Souvenir Henri Desgrange was given in honour of Tour founder Henri Desgrange to the first rider to pass the summit of the Col du Tourmalet on stage 10. This prize was won by José Patrocinio Jiménez.

Classification leadership by stage
Stage	Stage winner	General classification	Points classification	Mountains classification	Young rider classification	Combination classification	Intermediate sprints classification	Team classifications		Combativity award
Stage	Stage winner	General classification	Points classification	Mountains classification	Young rider classification	Combination classification	Intermediate sprints classification	By time	By points	Combativity award
P	Eric Vanderaerden	Eric Vanderaerden	Eric Vanderaerden	no award	Eric Vanderaerden	Eric Vanderaerden	no award	Peugeot–Shell–Michelin	Peugeot–Shell–Michelin	not awarded
1	Frits Pirard	Eric Vanderaerden	Frits Pirard	Gilbert Duclos-Lassalle	Eric Vanderaerden	Eric Vanderaerden	Eric Vanderaerden	Peugeot–Shell–Michelin	Renault–Elf	Pierre Le Bigaut
2	COOP–Mercier–Mavic	Jean-Louis Gauthier	Frits Pirard	Gilbert Duclos-Lassalle	Claude Moreau	Pascal Jules	Eric Vanderaerden	COOP–Mercier–Mavic	Renault–Elf	not awarded
3	Rudy Matthijs	Kim Andersen	Eric Vanderaerden	Gilbert Duclos-Lassalle	Claude Moreau	Eric Vanderaerden	Eric Vanderaerden	COOP–Mercier–Mavic	Renault–Elf	Rudy Matthijs
4	Serge Demierre	Kim Andersen	Eric Vanderaerden	Gilbert Duclos-Lassalle	Eric Vanderaerden	Gilbert Duclos-Lassalle	Eric Vanderaerden	COOP–Mercier–Mavic	Renault–Elf	Serge Demierre
5	Dominique Gaigne	Kim Andersen	Eric Vanderaerden	Gilbert Duclos-Lassalle	Eric Vanderaerden	Gilbert Duclos-Lassalle	Eric Vanderaerden	COOP–Mercier–Mavic	Renault–Elf	Éric Dall'Armelina
6	Bert Oosterbosch	Kim Andersen	Eric Vanderaerden	Gilbert Duclos-Lassalle	Eric Vanderaerden	Gilbert Duclos-Lassalle	Eric Vanderaerden	COOP–Mercier–Mavic	Renault–Elf	not awarded
7	Riccardo Magrini	Kim Andersen	Eric Vanderaerden	Gilbert Duclos-Lassalle	Eric Vanderaerden	Gilbert Duclos-Lassalle	Eric Vanderaerden	COOP–Mercier–Mavic	La Redoute–Motobécane	Bernard Vallet
8	Bert Oosterbosch	Kim Andersen	Sean Kelly	Gilbert Duclos-Lassalle	Eric Vanderaerden	Kim Andersen	Sean Kelly	COOP–Mercier–Mavic	La Redoute–Motobécane	Henk Lubberding
9	Philippe Chevallier	Sean Kelly	Sean Kelly	Gilbert Duclos-Lassalle	Stephen Roche	Gilbert Duclos-Lassalle	Sean Kelly	COOP–Mercier–Mavic	La Redoute–Motobécane	Philippe Chevallier
10	Robert Millar	Pascal Simon	Sean Kelly	José Patrocinio Jiménez	Laurent Fignon	José Patrocinio Jiménez	Sean Kelly	Peugeot–Shell–Michelin	La Redoute–Motobécane	José Patrocinio Jiménez
11	Régis Clère	Pascal Simon	Sean Kelly	José Patrocinio Jiménez	Laurent Fignon	José Patrocinio Jiménez	Sean Kelly	Peugeot–Shell–Michelin	La Redoute–Motobécane	Joaquim Agostinho
12	Kim Andersen	Pascal Simon	Sean Kelly	José Patrocinio Jiménez	Laurent Fignon	José Patrocinio Jiménez	Sean Kelly	Peugeot–Shell–Michelin	La Redoute–Motobécane	Adri van der Poel
13	Henk Lubberding	Pascal Simon	Sean Kelly	Robert Millar	Laurent Fignon	Pascal Simon	Sean Kelly	COOP–Mercier–Mavic	TI–Raleigh–Campagnolo	Régis Clère
14	Pierre Le Bigaut	Pascal Simon	Sean Kelly	Robert Millar	Laurent Fignon	Sean Kelly	Sean Kelly	COOP–Mercier–Mavic	TI–Raleigh–Campagnolo	Pierre Le Bigaut
15	Ángel Arroyo	Pascal Simon	Sean Kelly	José Patrocinio Jiménez	Laurent Fignon	Sean Kelly	Sean Kelly	COOP–Mercier–Mavic	TI–Raleigh–Campagnolo	not awarded
16	Michel Laurent	Pascal Simon	Sean Kelly	José Patrocinio Jiménez	Laurent Fignon	Sean Kelly	Sean Kelly	COOP–Mercier–Mavic	TI–Raleigh–Campagnolo	Michel Laurent
17	Peter Winnen	Laurent Fignon	Sean Kelly	Lucien Van Impe	Laurent Fignon	Pedro Delgado	Sean Kelly	COOP–Mercier–Mavic	TI–Raleigh–Campagnolo	Christian Jourdan
18	Jacques Michaud	Laurent Fignon	Sean Kelly	Lucien Van Impe	Laurent Fignon	Lucien Van Impe	Sean Kelly	COOP–Mercier–Mavic	TI–Raleigh–Campagnolo	Ángel Arroyo
19	Lucien Van Impe	Laurent Fignon	Sean Kelly	Lucien Van Impe	Laurent Fignon	Lucien Van Impe	Sean Kelly	COOP–Mercier–Mavic	TI–Raleigh–Campagnolo	not awarded
20	Philippe Leleu	Laurent Fignon	Sean Kelly	Lucien Van Impe	Laurent Fignon	Lucien Van Impe	Sean Kelly	COOP–Mercier–Mavic	TI–Raleigh–Campagnolo	Philippe Leleu
21	Laurent Fignon	Laurent Fignon	Sean Kelly	Lucien Van Impe	Laurent Fignon	Lucien Van Impe	Sean Kelly	TI–Raleigh–Campagnolo	TI–Raleigh–Campagnolo	not awarded
22	Gilbert Glaus	Laurent Fignon	Sean Kelly	Lucien Van Impe	Laurent Fignon	Laurent Fignon	Sean Kelly	TI–Raleigh–Campagnolo	TI–Raleigh–Campagnolo	Christian Jourdan
Final		Laurent Fignon	Sean Kelly	Lucien Van Impe	Laurent Fignon	Laurent Fignon	Sean Kelly	TI–Raleigh–Campagnolo	TI–Raleigh–Campagnolo	Serge Demierre

== Final standings ==
Legend
A yellow jersey.	Denotes the winner of the general classification	A green jersey.	Denotes the winner of the points classification
A white jersey with red polka dots.	Denotes the winner of the mountains classification	A white jersey.	Denotes the winner of the young rider classification

=== General classification ===
Final general classification (1–10)
Rank	Rider	Team	Time
1	Laurent Fignon (FRA)	Renault–Elf	105h 07' 52"
2	Ángel Arroyo (ESP)	Reynolds	+ 4' 04"
3	Peter Winnen (NED)	TI–Raleigh–Campagnolo	+ 4' 09"
4	Lucien Van Impe (BEL)	Metauro Mobili–Pinarello	+ 4' 16"
5	Robert Alban (FRA)	La Redoute–Motobécane	+ 7' 53"
6	Jean-René Bernaudeau (FRA)	Wolber–Spidel	+ 8' 59"
7	Sean Kelly (IRE)	Sem–Reydel–Mavic	+ 12' 09"
8	Marc Madiot (FRA)	Renault–Elf	+ 14' 55"
9	Phil Anderson (AUS)	Peugeot–Shell–Michelin	+ 16' 56"
10	Henk Lubberding (NED)	TI–Raleigh–Campagnolo	+ 18' 55"

Final general classification (11–88)
Rank	Rider	Team	Time
11	Joaquim Agostinho (POR)	Sem–Reydel–Mavic	+ 19' 00"
12	Jonathan Boyer (USA)	Sem–Reydel–Mavic	+ 19' 57"
13	Stephen Roche (IRE)	Peugeot–Shell–Michelin	+ 21' 30"
14	Robert Millar (GBR)	Peugeot–Shell–Michelin	+ 23' 29"
15	Pedro Delgado (ESP)	Reynolds	+ 25' 44"
16	Edgar Corredor (COL)	Varta–Colombia	+ 26' 08"
17	José Patrocinio Jiménez (COL)	Varta–Colombia	+ 28' 05"
18	Claude Criquielion (BEL)	Splendor–Euro Shop	+ 33' 29"
19	Jacques Michaud (FRA)	COOP–Mercier–Mavic	+ 35' 34"
20	Christian Seznec (FRA)	Wolber–Spidel	+ 39' 49"
21	Pierre Bazzo (FRA)	COOP–Mercier–Mavic	+ 40' 34"
22	Beat Breu (SUI)	Cilo–Aufina	+ 43' 53"
23	Joop Zoetemelk (NED)	COOP–Mercier–Mavic	+ 47' 40"
24	Éric Caritoux (FRA)	Sem–Reydel–Mavic	+ 52' 56"
25	Jean-Luc Vandenbroucke (BEL)	La Redoute–Motobécane	+ 54' 08"
26	Dominique Arnaud (FRA)	Wolber–Spidel	+ 57' 23"
27	Gerard Veldscholten (NED)	TI–Raleigh–Campagnolo	+ 1h 00' 00"
28	Kim Andersen (DEN)	COOP–Mercier–Mavic	+ 1h 02' 58"
29	Theo de Rooij (NED)	TI–Raleigh–Campagnolo	+ 1h 05' 41"
30	Marc Durant (FRA)	Wolber–Spidel	+ 1h 09' 28"
31	Antonio Ferretti (SUI)	Cilo–Aufina	+ 1h 11' 33"
32	Pierre Le Bigaut (FRA)	COOP–Mercier–Mavic	+ 1h 14' 22"
33	Alain Vigneron (FRA)	Renault–Elf	+ 1h 18' 13"
34	Bernard Gavillet (SUI)	Cilo–Aufina	+ 1h 21' 06"
35	Didier Vanoverschelde (FRA)	La Redoute–Motobécane	+ 1h 24' 19"
36	Patrick Clerc (FRA)	Sem–Reydel–Mavic	+ 1h 25' 40"
37	Adri van der Poel (NED)	Jacky Aernoudt–Rossin–Campagnolo	+ 1h 29' 53"
38	Patrick Bonnet (FRA)	Wolber–Spidel	+ 1h 31' 53"
39	Alfio Vandi (ITA)	Metauro Mobili–Pinarello	+ 1h 32' 59"
40	Dominique Garde (FRA)	Peugeot–Shell–Michelin	+ 1h 33' 50"
41	Philippe Leleu (FRA)	Wolber–Spidel	+ 1h 34' 08"
42	Frits Pirard (NED)	Metauro Mobili–Pinarello	+ 1h 39' 22"
43	Raymond Martin (FRA)	COOP–Mercier–Mavic	+ 1h 40' 25"
44	Abelardo Rios (COL)	Varta–Colombia	+ 1h 40' 59"
45	Christian Jourdan (FRA)	La Redoute–Motobécane	+ 1h 42' 45"
46	Celestino Prieto (ESP)	Reynolds	+ 1h 46' 08"
47	Philippe Chevallier (FRA)	Renault–Elf	+ 1h 50' 10"
48	Ludwig Wijnants (BEL)	Boule d'Or–Colnago	+ 1h 50' 12"
49	Paul Haghedooren (BEL)	Splendor–Euro Shop	+ 1h 51' 17"
50	Hubert Linard (FRA)	Peugeot–Shell–Michelin	+ 1h 53' 15"
51	Anastasio Greciano (ESP)	Reynolds	+ 1h 53' 52"
52	Lucien Didier (LUX)	Renault–Elf	+ 1h 54' 45"
53	Bernard Bourreau (FRA)	Peugeot–Shell–Michelin	+ 1h 54' 46"
54	Jesus Hernández (ESP)	Reynolds	+ 1h 58' 39"
55	Carlos Hernández (ESP)	Reynolds	+ 1h 58' 46"
56	Charly Berard (FRA)	Renault–Elf	+ 1h 59' 05"
57	Samuel Cabrera (COL)	Varta–Colombia	+ 2h 03' 48"
58	Bernard Vallet (FRA)	La Redoute–Motobécane	+ 2h 04' 02"
59	Gilbert Duclos-Lassalle (FRA)	Peugeot–Shell–Michelin	+ 2h 05' 18"
60	Claude Moreau (FRA)	COOP–Mercier–Mavic	+ 2h 06' 10"
61	Pascal Jules (FRA)	Renault–Elf	+ 2h 06' 29"
62	Jacques Bossis (FRA)	Peugeot–Shell–Michelin	+ 2h 06' 50"
63	Hendrik Devos (BEL)	Splendor–Euro Shop	+ 2h 07' 46"
64	Alfonso Lopez (COL)	Varta–Colombia	+ 2h 09' 42"
65	Dominique Gaigne (FRA)	Renault–Elf	+ 2h 09' 58"
66	Jean-François Rodriguez (FRA)	Wolber–Spidel	+ 2h 10' 29"
67	Rudy Rogiers (BEL)	Jacky Aernoudt–Rossin–Campagnolo	+ 2h 10' 38"
68	Jan Wijnants (BEL)	Boule d'Or–Colnago	+ 2h 10' 53"
69	Graham Jones (GBR)	Wolber–Spidel	+ 2h 15' 03"
70	Eugène Urbany (LUX)	Boule d'Or–Colnago	+ 2h 16' 43"
71	Serge Demierre (SUI)	Cilo–Aufina	+ 2h 19' 33"
72	Johan Lammerts (NED)	TI–Raleigh–Campagnolo	+ 2h 21' 15"
73	Ludo De Keulenaer (BEL)	TI–Raleigh–Campagnolo	+ 2h 22' 37"
74	Eric Dall'Armelina (FRA)	Sem–Reydel–Mavic	+ 2h 25' 54"
75	Enrique Aja (ESP)	Reynolds	+ 2h 29' 49"
76	Jean-Louis Gauthier (FRA)	COOP–Mercier–Mavic	+ 2h 32' 15"
77	Guy Janiszewski (BEL)	Boule d'Or–Colnago	+ 2h 35' 19"
78	Frédéric Brun (FRA)	Peugeot–Shell–Michelin	+ 2h 44' 00"
79	Laurent Biondi (FRA)	La Redoute–Motobécane	+ 2h 44' 04"
80	Jan van Houwelingen (NED)	Boule d'Or–Colnago	+ 2h 45' 47"
81	Henri Manders (NED)	Jacky Aernoudt–Rossin–Campagnolo	+ 2h 56' 46"
82	Marc Dierickx (BEL)	Jacky Aernoudt–Rossin–Campagnolo	+ 2h 57' 16"
83	Julius Thalmann (SUI)	Cilo–Aufina	+ 3h 01' 48"
84	Erich Mächler (SUI)	Cilo–Aufina	+ 3h 16' 31"
85	Gilbert Glaus (SUI)	Cilo–Aufina	+ 3h 33' 56"
86	Guy Gallopin (FRA)	La Redoute–Motobécane	+ 3h 34' 57"
87	Marcel Russenberger (SUI)	Cilo–Aufina	+ 3h 42' 07"
88	Marcel Laurens (BEL)	Jacky Aernoudt–Rossin–Campagnolo	+ 4h 02' 46"

=== Points classification ===
Final points classification (1–10)
Rank	Rider	Team	Points
1	Sean Kelly (IRE)	Sem–Reydel–Mavic	360
2	Frits Pirard (NED)	Metauro Mobili–Pinarello	144
3	Laurent Fignon (FRA)	Renault–Elf	126
4	Gilbert Glaus (SUI)	Cilo–Aufina	122
5	Pierre Le Bigaut (FRA)	COOP–Mercier–Mavic	103
6	Henk Lubberding (NED)	TI–Raleigh–Campagnolo	101
7	Phil Anderson (AUS)	Peugeot–Shell–Michelin	97
8	Adri van der Poel (NED)	Jacky Aernoudt–Rossin–Campagnolo	96
9	Kim Andersen (DEN)	COOP–Mercier–Mavic	93
10	Serge Demierre (SUI)	Cilo–Aufina	84

=== Mountains classification ===
Final mountains classification (1–10)
Rank	Rider	Team	Points
1	Lucien Van Impe (BEL)	Metauro Mobili–Pinarello	272
2	José Patrocinio Jiménez (COL)	Varta–Colombia	195
3	Robert Millar (GBR)	Peugeot–Shell–Michelin	157
4	Pedro Delgado (ESP)	Reynolds	133
5	Jean-René Bernaudeau (FRA)	Wolber–Spidel	125
6	Ángel Arroyo (ESP)	Reynolds	121
7	Jacques Michaud (FRA)	COOP–Mercier–Mavic	117
8	Edgar Corredor (COL)	Varta–Colombia	110
9	Peter Winnen (NED)	TI–Raleigh–Campagnolo	105
10	Laurent Fignon (FRA)	Renault–Elf	94

=== Young rider classification ===
Final young rider classification (1–10)
Rank	Rider	Team	Time
1	Laurent Fignon (FRA)	Renault–Elf	105h 07' 52"
2	Ángel Arroyo (ESP)	Reynolds	+ 4' 04"
3	Stephen Roche (IRE)	Peugeot–Shell–Michelin	+ 21' 30"
4	Robert Millar (GBR)	Peugeot–Shell–Michelin	+ 23' 29"
5	Pedro Delgado (ESP)	Reynolds	+ 25' 44"
6	Edgar Corredor (COL)	Varta–Colombia	+ 26' 08"
7	José Patrocinio Jiménez (COL)	Varta–Colombia	+ 28' 05"
8	Éric Caritoux (FRA)	Sem–Reydel–Mavic	+ 52' 56"
9	Bernard Gavillet (SUI)	Cilo–Aufina	+ 1h 21' 06"
10	Philippe Leleu (FRA)	Wolber–Spidel	+ 1h 34' 08"

=== Combination classification ===
Final combination classification (1–10)
Rank	Rider	Team	Points
1	Laurent Fignon (FRA)	Renault–Elf	8
2	Lucien Van Impe (BEL)	Metauro Mobili–Pinarello	7
3	Sean Kelly (IRE)	Sem–Reydel–Mavic	5
4	Ángel Arroyo (ESP)	Reynolds	4
5	José Patrocinio Jiménez (COL)	Varta–Colombia	4
6	Frits Pirard (NED)	Metauro Mobili–Pinarello	4
7	Robert Millar (GBR)	Peugeot–Shell–Michelin	3
8	Peter Winnen (NED)	TI–Raleigh–Campagnolo	3
9	Gilbert Glaus (SUI)	Cilo–Aufina	2
10	Pedro Delgado (ESP)	Reynolds	2

=== Intermediate sprints classification ===
Final intermediate sprints classification (1–10)
Rank	Rider	Team	Points
1	Sean Kelly (IRE)	Sem–Reydel–Mavic	151
2	Pierre Le Bigaut (FRA)	COOP–Mercier–Mavic	77
3	Laurent Fignon (FRA)	Renault–Elf	54
4	Phil Anderson (AUS)	Peugeot–Shell–Michelin	48
5	Frits Pirard (NED)	Metauro Mobili–Pinarello	42
6	Christian Jourdan (FRA)	La Redoute–Motobécane	40
7	Henk Lubberding (NED)	TI–Raleigh–Campagnolo	39
8	Serge Demierre (SUI)	Cilo–Aufina	37
9	Adri van der Poel (NED)	Jacky Aernoudt–Rossin–Campagnolo	32
10	Gilbert Duclos-Lassalle (FRA)	Peugeot–Shell–Michelin	31

=== Team classification ===
Final team classification (1–10)
Rank	Team	Time
1	TI–Raleigh–Campagnolo	322h 39' 07"
2	COOP–Mercier–Mavic	+ 4' 02"
3	Peugeot–Shell–Michelin	+ 9' 03"
4	Renault–Elf	+ 36' 39"
5	Sem–Reydel–Mavic	+ 40' 13"
6	Wolber–Spidel	+ 1h 01' 36"
7	Reynolds	+ 1h 19' 11"
8	La Redoute–Motobécane	+ 1h 56' 48"
9	Cilo–Aufina	+ 2h 04' 47"
10	Varta–Colombia	+ 2h 09' 16"

=== Team points classification ===
Final team points classification (1–10)
Rank	Team	Points
1	TI–Raleigh–Campagnolo	1008
2	La Redoute–Motobécane	1201
3	Renault–Elf	1207
4	Peugeot–Shell–Michelin	1293
5	Sem–Reydel–Mavic	1308
6	COOP–Mercier–Mavic	1434
7	Wolber–Spidel	1694
8	Reynolds	1882
9	Boule d'Or–Colnago	2295
10	Cilo–Aufina	2290

=== Combativity classification ===
Final combativity classification (1–3)
Rank	Rider	Team	Points
1	Serge Demierre (SUI)	Cilo–Aufina	38
2	Christian Jourdan (FRA)	La Redoute–Motobécane	33
3	Pierre Le Bigaut (FRA)	COOP–Mercier–Mavic	26

== Bibliography ==
- Augendre, Jacques (2016). Guide historique [Historical guide] (PDF) (in French). Paris: Amaury Sport Organisation. Archived (PDF) from the original on 17 August 2016.
- Martin, Pierre; Penazzo, Sergio; Schamps, Daniel; Vos, Cor (1983). Tour 83: The Stories of the 1983 Tour of Italy and Tour de France. Keighley, UK: Kennedy Brothers Publishing. OCLC 12476671.
- McGann, Bill; McGann, Carol (2008). The Story of the Tour de France: 1965–2007. Vol. 2. Indianapolis: Dog Ear Publishing. ISBN 978-1-59858-608-4.
- Nauright, John; Parrish, Charles (2012). Sports Around the World: History, Culture, and Practice. Vol. 2. Santa Barbara, California: ABC-CLIO. ISBN 978-1-59884-300-2.
- van den Akker, Pieter (2018). Tour de France Rules and Statistics: 1903–2018. Self-published. ISBN 978-1-79398-080-9.
