= 1986 Tour du Haut Var =

Race details
- Dates: 22 February 1986
- Stages: 1
- Distance: 182 km (113.1 mi)
- Winning time: 5h 11' 54"

Results
	Winner	Pascal Simon (FRA)
	Second	Marc Madiot (FRA)
	Third	Dag Otto Lauritzen (NOR)

The 1986 Tour du Haut Var was the 18th edition of the Tour du Haut Var cycle race and was held on 22 February 1986. The race started in Seillans and finished in Draguignan. The race was won by Pascal Simon.

== General classification ==
Final general classification

Rank	Rider	Time
1	Pascal Simon (FRA)	5h 11' 54"
2	Marc Madiot (FRA)	+ 0"
3	Dag Otto Lauritzen (NOR)	+ 1' 43"
4	Marc Sergeant (BEL)	+ 1' 48"
5	Francis Castaing (FRA)	+ 1' 50"
6	Gilbert Duclos-Lassalle (FRA)	+ 1' 50"
7	Adri van der Poel (NED)	+ 1' 50"
8	Ronan Pensec (FRA)	+ 1' 50"
9	Bruno Cornillet (FRA)	+ 1' 50"
10	Pierre Le Bigaut (FRA)	+ 1' 50"
