= Nedo Pinori =

Italian cyclist

Personal information
- Born: 6 June 1961 (age 65)

Cycling career
- Sport: Cycling
- Role: Rider

Nedo Pinori (born 6 June 1961) is an Italian racing cyclist. He rode in the 1983 Tour de France.
