= Rafael Tolosa =

Colombian cyclist (1958–2026)

Personal information
- Full name: Rafael Antonio Tolosa Calvo
- Born: 28 August 1958
- Died: 13 April 2026 (aged 67)

Cycling career
- Sport: Cycling
- Role: Rider

Rafael Antonio Tolosa Calvo (28 August 1958 – 13 April 2026) was a Colombian racing cyclist. He rode in the 1983 Tour de France.

Tolosa died on 13 April 2026, at the age of 67. His brother, Ramón (1960–2025), was also a cyclist.
