= Fabio Casas Buitrago =

Colombian cyclist

Personal information
- Born: 13 March 1959 (age 67)

Cycling career
- Sport: Cycling
- Role: Rider

Fabio Casas Buitrago (born 13 March 1959) is a Colombian racing cyclist. He rode in the 1983 Tour de France.
