= Marco Franceschini =

Italian cyclist

Personal information
- Born: 7 April 1960 (age 66)

Cycling career
- Sport: Cycling
- Role: Rider

Marco Franceschini (born 7 April 1960) is an Italian racing cyclist. He rode in the 1983 Tour de France.
