= Éric Dall'Armelina =

French cyclist (born 1959)

Personal information
- Born: 15 November 1959 (age 66) Oullins, France

Cycling career
- Sport: Cycling
- Discipline: Road
- Role: Rider

Professional team
- 1982–1984: Sem–France Loire–Campagnolo

Éric Dall'Armelina (born 15 November 1959) is a French former racing cyclist. He rode in the 1983 Tour de France and the 1984 Vuelta a España.

== Major results ==
1982
1st Stage 2 Paris–Bourges
1st Stage 1 Tour de Corse
4th Paris–Tours
1983
1st Grand Prix de Mauléon-Moulins
1st Nice–Alassio
1st Stage 9 Tour de Suisse
1st Stage 2b Critérium du Dauphiné Libéré
1st Stage 3 Tour Européen Lorraine-Alsace
1984
1st Stage 3a Tour d'Armorique
2nd Road race, National Road Championships
4th Grand Prix de Mauléon-Moulins
