= José Alfonso López =

Colombian cyclist

Personal information
- Full name: José Alfonso López Linares Lemus
- Nickname: El Pollo López
- Born: 22 June 1952 (age 74) Bogotá, Colombia

Cycling career
- Sport: Cycling
- Discipline: Road
- Role: Rider

Professional teams
- 1983–1986: Varta–Colombia
- 1987: Western–Rossin

José Alfonso López (born 22 June 1952) is a Colombian former professional racing cyclist. He rode in two editions of the Tour de France.

== Major results ==
1976
4th Overall Vuelta a Costa Rica

1st Sprints classification
1st Stages 3 & 5

1977
1st Stage 5 Vuelta a Cundinamarca
10th Overall Vuelta a Colombia
1981
1st Stage 1 (TTT) Vuelta a Colombia
1982
1st Stage 3 Tour de l'Avenir
7th Overall Vuelta a Colombia
1983
5th Overall Vuelta a Colombia

=== Grand Tour general classification results timeline ===
Grand Tour	1983	1984	1985	1986
Vuelta a España	—	—	DNF	—
Giro d'Italia	—	—	DNF	—
Tour de France	64	107	—	DNF
