= Ole Kristian Silseth =

Norwegian cyclist

Personal information
- Born: 24 May 1958 (age 68) Oslo, Norway

Cycling career
- Sport: Cycling
- Role: Rider

Ole Kristian Silseth (born 1 October 1959) is a Norwegian former professional racing cyclist. He won the Norwegian National Road Race Championship in 1982.
