= Cristóbal Pérez =

Colombian cyclist

Personal information
- Born: 23 August 1952 (age 74) Boyacá Department, Colombia

Cycling career
- Sport: Cycling
- Role: Rider

Cristóbal Pérez (born 23 August 1952) is a Colombian former professional racing cyclist. He rode in two editions of the Tour de France. He also rode in the team time trial event at the 1976 Summer Olympics.
