= Serge Demierre =

Swiss cyclist

Personal information
- Full name: Serge Demierre
- Born: 16 January 1956 (age 70) Geneva, Switzerland

Cycling career
- Sport: Cycling
- Current team: Retired
- Discipline: Road
- Role: Rider

Serge Demierre (born 16 January 1956) was a Swiss professional road bicycle racer. He competed in the individual road race event at the 1976 Summer Olympics. In 1983, Demierre won the Combativity award and the 4th stage of the 1983 Tour de France. He was the Swiss National Road Race champion in 1983.

== Major results ==
1976
Switzerland National Amateur Road Race Championship
1981
Trofeo Baracchi (with Daniel Gisiger)
1982
Buch am Irchel
1983
Switzerland National Road Race Championship
Tour de France

Winner stage 4
Winner Combativity award

1987
Lausanne
Sion
