= Philippe Chevallier (cyclist) =

French cyclist

Personal information
- Full name: Philippe Chevallier
- Born: 26 April 1961 (age 65) Annemasse, France

Cycling career
- Sport: Cycling
- Current team: Retired
- Discipline: Road
- Role: Rider

Philippe Chevallier (born 26 April 1961) was a French professional road bicycle racer. He competed in the team pursuit event at the 1980 Summer Olympics. Chevallier worked at the UCI from 2000 to 2015. Afterwards he served in different managerial roles for the cycling team Decathlon–AG2R La Mondiale.

== Major results ==
1979
France National Junior Track Pursuit Championship
France National Junior Road Race Championship
1983
Tour de France:

Winner stage 9

1987
Berner Rundfahrt
