= Philippe Leleu =

French cyclist

Personal information
- Full name: Philippe Leleu
- Born: March 28, 1958 (age 68) Lamballe, France

Cycling career
- Sport: Cycling
- Current team: Retired
- Discipline: Road
- Role: Rider

Major wins
- 1 stage 1983 Tour de France

Philippe Leleu (born 28 March 1958 in Lamballe, Côtes-d'Armor) was a French professional road bicycle racer.

== Major results ==
1981
4th Overall Etoile des Espoirs
7th Overall Ruban Granitier Breton
1982
1st Stage 1 Tour du Limousin
1st Stage 6 Tour de l'Avenir
10th GP Ouest France - Plouay
1983
1st Stage 2a Tour d'Armorique
1st Stage 20 Tour de France
2nd Maël-Pestivien
1984
1st Prologue Tour d'Armorique
2nd Tour du Nord-Ouest
3rd Maël-Pestivien
5th Zuri Metzgete
6th GP Ouest France - Plouay
7th Grand Prix Cerami
9th GP de la Ville de Rennes
1985
1st Stage 5 4 Jours de Dunkerque
1st Stage 2 Tour d'Armorique
3rd Maël-Pestivien
3rd Tour de Vendée
4th Kuurne-Bruxelles-Kuurne
4th GP Ouest France - Plouay
1986
2nd Overall Tour d'Armorique

1st Stage 3

1987
10th Grand Prix d'Isbergues - Pas de Calais
1988
1st Stage 3a Tour d'Armorique
6th GP Ouest France - Plouay
1989
4th GP de Denain Porte du Hainaut
6th Overall Route du Sud

1st Stage 2
