= Patrick Clerc =

French cyclist

Personal information
- Born: 20 September 1957 (age 69) La Tronche, France

Cycling career
- Sport: Cycling
- Role: Rider

Patrick Clerc (born 20 September 1957) is a French former professional racing cyclist. He rode in four editions of the Tour de France and one edition of the Vuelta a España.
