= Julius Thalmann =

Swiss cyclist

Personal information
- Born: 7 April 1960 (age 66) Romoos, Switzerland

Cycling career
- Sport: Cycling
- Role: Rider

Julius Thalmann (born 7 April 1960) is a Swiss former professional racing cyclist. He rode in three editions of the Tour de France.
