= Ludo De Keulenaer =

Belgian cyclist

Personal information
- Born: 16 January 1960 (age 66) Brasschaat, Belgium

Cycling career
- Sport: Cycling
- Role: Rider

Ludo De Keulenaer (born 16 January 1960) is a Belgian former professional racing cyclist. He rode in four editions of the Tour de France.
