= Antonio Ferretti =

Swiss cyclist

Personal information
- Born: 19 January 1957 (age 69) Arbedo, Switzerland

Cycling career
- Sport: Cycling
- Role: Rider

Antonio Ferretti (born 19 January 1957) is a Swiss former professional racing cyclist. He rode in three editions of the Tour de France.
