= Kim Andersen (cyclist) =

Danish racing cyclist (born 1958)

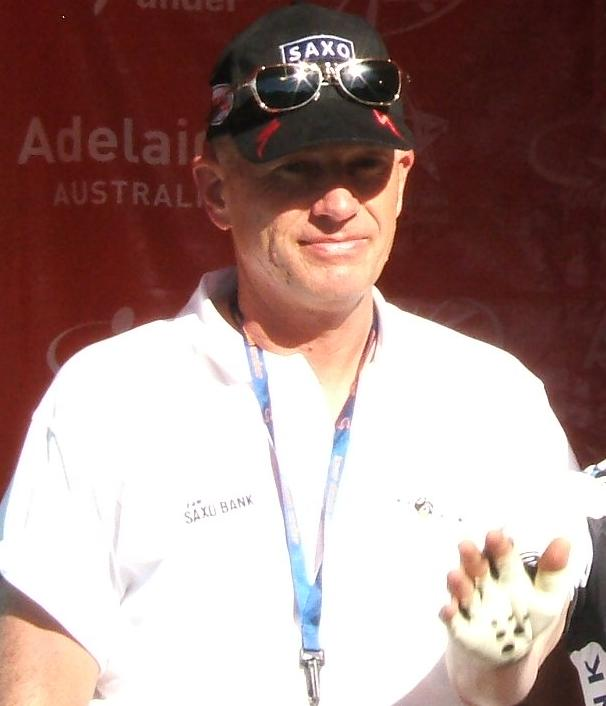

Personal information
- Full name: Kim Andersen
- Born: 2 October 1958 (age 68) Malling, Denmark

Cycling career
- Sport: Cycling
- Current team: Lidl–Trek
- Discipline: Road
- Role: Directeur sportif

Professional teams
- 1980–1984: Coop
- 1985–1986: La Vie Claire
- 1987–1987: Toshiba
- 1988–1992: Z Team

Managerial teams
- 1998–1999: Team Chicky World
- 2000–2003: Team Fakta
- 2004–2010: Team CSC
- 2011–: Leopard Trek

Kim Andersen (born 10 February 1958) is a Danish former professional road bicycle racer and current cycling team directeur sportif. From 2004 to 2010, he was a directeur sportif for Danish ProTour Team Saxo Bank. From 2011, he holds the same position at the Leopard Trek team.

== Rider ==
In 1983 he became the first Dane to wear the yellow jersey in the Tour de France, and later won stages in that race. He has also sported stage wins in Vuelta a España, Four Days of Dunkirk, Ronde van Nederland, Midi Libre and Tour de Suisse, as well as numerous individual wins, 31 during his career. In 1984 he won the semi-classic Flèche Wallonne.

== Doping ==
Kim Andersen was tested positive for doping in 1987, and was banned for life, a sentence that was later changed to a one-year quarantine. In 1992 he was tested positive again, and fired from his team. He rode as an individual for the rest of the year, before finally retiring.

== Major results ==
1980
Stage 3, Ronde van Nederland
1981
Stage 10, Vuelta a España:
GP Cannes
1982
Stage 3, Ronde van Nederland
Stage 4, Four Days of Dunkirk
Stage 3, Midi Libre
Stage 3, Tour de l'Aude
1983
Danmark Rundt
Trophée des Grimpeurs
GP Monaco
Stage 12, Tour de France
1984
La Flèche Wallonne
Grand Prix d'Isbergues
Danmark Rundt
Stage 1A and overall, Tour du Limousin
Stage 4, Four Days of Dunkirk
1985
Stage 2, Danmark Rundt
Stage 5A, Étoile des Espoirs
1986
Paris–Camembert
Stage 3A, Tour of Ireland
1987 (tested positive for doping usage)
Denmark National Champion
Scandinavian Champion
Paris–Bourges
Danmark Rundt
Stage 4, Tour de Limousin
Stage 3, Étoile de Bessèges
Stage 1 and 2, Tour de Bouges
1990
GP de Cholet-Pays-de-Loire
Stage 10, Tour de Suisse
1991
GP de Rennes
Tour de Poitou-Charentes et de la Vienne

== Sports director ==
Andersen was hired as sports director of newly started Danish team Team Chicky World from 1998 until the closing of the team in 1999, after which he went to Team Fakta. After Team Fakta closed in 2003 he switched to Danish Team CSC (later Team Saxo Bank). He left in June 2010 to become founding directeur sportif of Leopard Trek, which became a licensed ProTour team for the 2011 season.

== See also ==
- List of sportspeople sanctioned for doping offences
