= Claude Moreau =

French cyclist

Personal information
- Born: 19 December 1958 (age 67) Sallertaine, France

Cycling career
- Sport: Cycling
- Role: Rider

Claude Moreau (born 19 December 1958) is a French former professional racing cyclist. He rode in two editions of the Tour de France.
