= Bernard Gavillet =

Swiss cyclist (1960–2024)

Personal information
- Born: 6 March 1960 Monthey, Switzerland
- Died: 13 June 2024 (aged 64)

Cycling career
- Sport: Cycling
- Discipline: Road
- Role: Rider

Professional teams
- 1982: Royal–Wrangler–Oliver Tex
- 1983–1986: Cilo–Aufina
- 1986–1987: Système U
- 1988: Panasonic–Isostar–Colnago–Agu
- 1989: Selca

Major wins
- Grand Tours Tour de France 1 TTT stage (1986)

Bernard Gavillet (6 March 1960 – 13 June 2024) was a Swiss professional racing cyclist. He rode in four editions of the Tour de France, two editions of the Giro d'Italia and one edition of the Vuelta a España. Gavillet died on 13 June 2024, at the age of 64.

== Major results ==
1977
3rd Road race, National Junior Road Championships
1981
5th Overall Tour de l'Avenir
7th Overall GP Tell
1983
2nd GP du canton d'Argovie
2nd National Hill-climb Championships
1984
1st National Hill-climb Championships
1986
1st Stage 2 (TTT) Tour de France
3rd National Hill-climb Championships
7th Milano–Vignola
1987
2nd Overall GP Tell

1st Stage 5b

3rd National Hill-climb Championships
