= Marc Madiot =

French cyclist

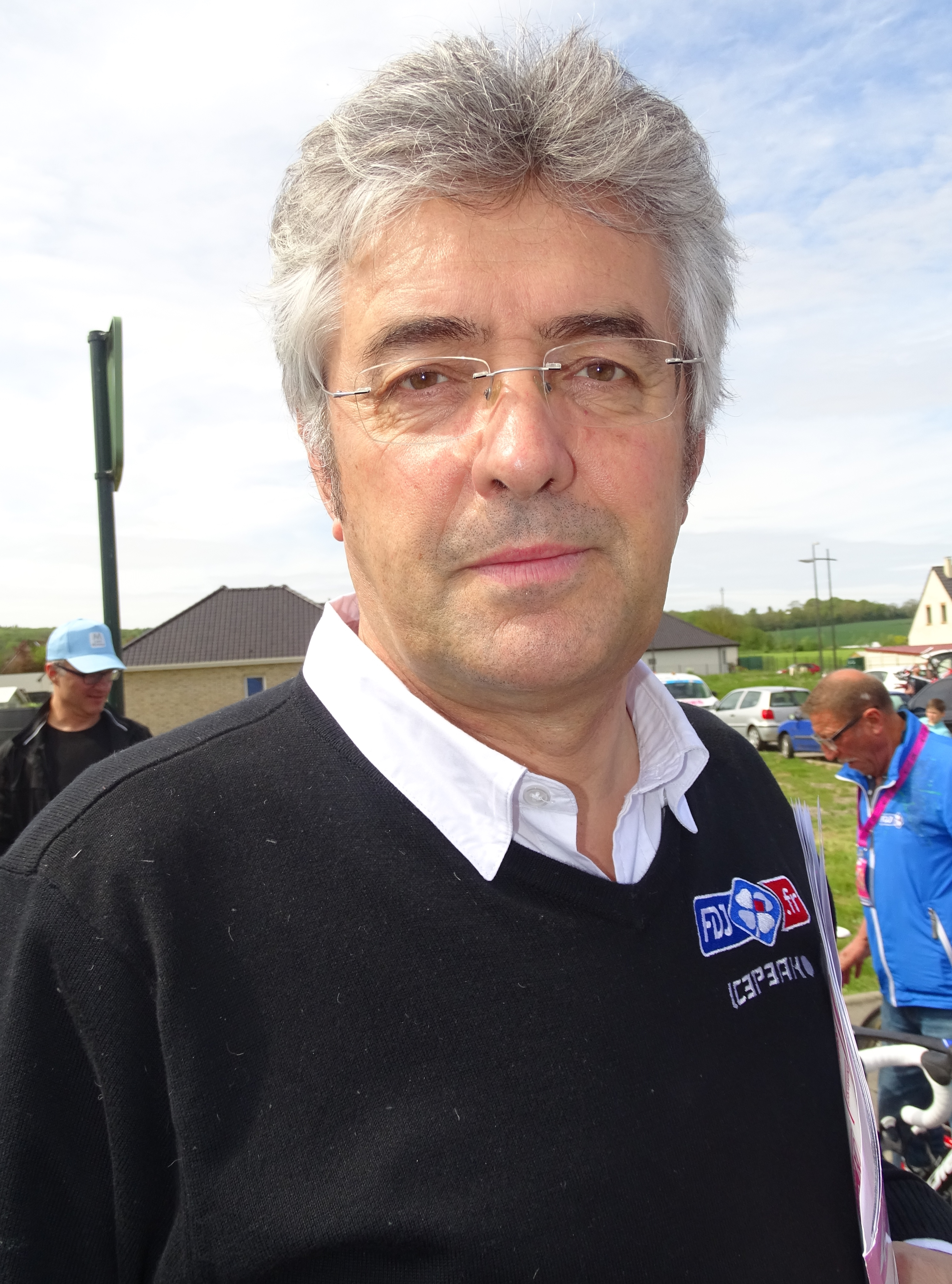
- Madiot at the 2015 Four Days of Dunkirk.

Personal information
- Full name: Marc Madiot
- Nickname: Mr. 1,000 Volts
- Born: 16 April 1959 (age 67) Renazé, France

Cycling career
- Sport: Cycling
- Current team: Groupama–FDJ United
- Disciplines: Road; Cyclo-cross
- Role: Rider (retired); General manager

Professional teams
- 1980–1985: Renault–Gitane
- 1986–1987: Système U
- 1988–1990: Toshiba–Look
- 1991: RMO
- 1992: Team Telekom
- 1993: Subaru–Montgomery
- 1994: Catavana–AS Corbeil–Essonnes–Cedico

Managerial team
- 1997–: Française des Jeux

Major wins
- Grand Tours Tour de France 1 individual stage (1984) 1 TTT stage (1984) One-Day races and Classics National Road Race Championships (1987) Paris–Roubaix (1985, 1991)

Marc Madiot (French: [maʁk madjo]; born 16 April 1959) is a French former professional road racing cyclist and double winner of Paris–Roubaix. He also competed in the individual road race event at the 1980 Summer Olympics. Retired from racing in 1994, he is now best known as the directeur sportif of Groupama–FDJ United, a UCI WorldTeam. He is also known as the president of the French Ligue National de Cyclisme (LNC).

In 1987, he made disparaging remarks about the sport of women's cycling, calling it ugly and unesthetic.

In 2008, he was made a knight of the French Legion of Honor. It was presented by president Nicolas Sarkozy at the Elysée palace in Paris.

He is the older brother of fellow retired racing cyclist and French national road racing champion Yvon Madiot.

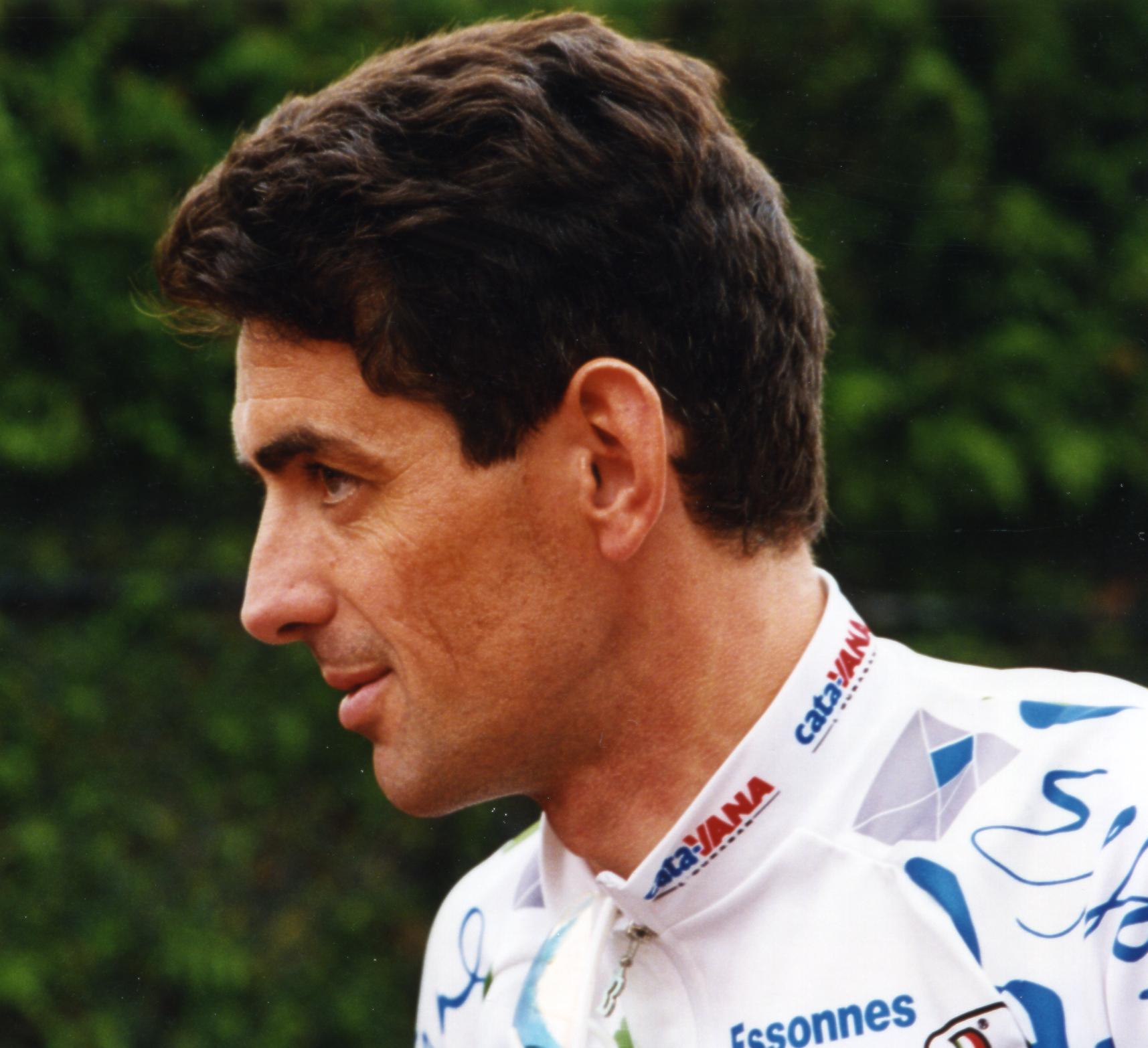
Madiot, as a member of the Catavana team, in 1994.

== Major results ==
1979
1st Overall Boucles de la Mayenne

1st Stage 2

1st Paris–Roubaix Espoirs
2nd Manche Atlantique
1980
1st Troyes–Dijon
Sealink International

1st Stages 1 & 2

9th Olympic Games, Road Race
1981
1st Overall Tour du Limousin

1st Stage 1

2nd Overall Tour du Tarn
2nd Overall Route du Sud
3rd Overall Tour de Picardie
3rd Tour de Vendée
3rd Overall Paris–Bourges
4th Grand Prix de Mauléon-Moulins
8th Overall Four Days of Dunkirk
10th GP Ouest France
10th Overall Étoile de Bessèges
1982
1st National Cyclo-cross Championships
1st Stage 1 (TTT) Giro d'Italia
2nd Overall Tour du Limousin
2nd Overall Paris–Bourges
2nd Boucles de l'Aulne
3rd Omloop der Vlaamse Ardennen Ichtegem
3rd Côte Normande
10th GP de la Ville de Rennes
1983
1st Polynormande
1st Saint-Martin de Landelles
2nd GP Ouest France
2nd Overall Paris–Bourges
3rd Overall Étoile des Espoirs
3rd National Cyclo-cross Championships
3rd Overall Giro di Sardegna

1st Stage 4

4th Overall Tour du Vaucluse
5th Paris–Roubaix
8th Overall Tour de France
9th Overall Tour du Limousin
1984
1st Stages 2 & 3 (TTT) Tour de France
1st Trophée des Grimpeurs
1st Flèche Finistérienne
1st Boucles de l'Aulne
1st Stage 5 Tirreno–Adriatico
1st Circuit de l'Aulne/GP Le Télégramme à Châteaulin
1st Stage 3 Tour de l'Aude
2nd Overall Tour du Limousin
3rd National Cyclo-cross Championships
4th Kuurne–Brussels–Kuurne
6th Liège–Bastogne–Liège
10th Milan–San Remo
1985
1st Paris–Roubaix
1st Grand Prix de Mauléon-Moulins
1st Grand Prix de Plumelec-Morbihan
1st Stage 2 Paris–Nice
1st Grand Prix de Wallonie
1st Chateau-Chinon
2nd National Cyclo-cross Championships
2nd Boucles de l'Aulne
2nd Grand Prix Cerami
3rd GP Ouest France
3rd Polynormande
4th Road race, UCI Road World Championships
6th Paris–Camembert
8th Overall Tour de l'Aude
1986
2nd Tour du Haut Var
1987
1st Road race, National Road Championships
1st Overall Tour de l'Avenir
1st Polynormande
2nd National Cyclo-cross Championships
3rd Giro di Lombardia
3rd Overall Grand Prix du Midi Libre
5th Grand Prix des Nations
7th Liège–Bastogne–Liège
1988
2nd Road race, National Road Championships
5th Overall Setmana Catalana de Ciclisme
7th Grand Prix des Amériques
9th Overall Tour de Romandie
1989
3rd Overall Paris–Nice
3rd GP de la Ville de Rennes
5th La Flèche Wallonne
6th Paris–Roubaix
6th Overall Grand Prix du Midi Libre
7th Overall Critérium International

1st Stage 1

7th Amstel Gold Race
8th Züri-Metzgete
8th Grand Prix des Amériques
9th Paris–Camembert
1990
1st Dijon, Cyclo-cross
7th Giro dell'Emilia
1991
1st Paris–Roubaix
6th Tour of Flanders
7th Wincanton Classic
7th Rund um den Henninger Turm
9th GP Ouest France
10th Grand Prix des Amériques
1992
1st Trophée des Grimpeurs
6th Züri-Metzgete
6th Paris–Camembert
7th Overall Four Days of Dunkirk

1st Stage 4b

7th Tour of Flanders
8th GP Ouest France
1993
2nd Bordeaux–Caudéran

=== Grand Tour general classification results timeline ===
| Grand Tour | 1982 | 1983 | 1984 | 1985 | 1986 | 1987 | 1988 | 1989 | 1990 | 1991 | 1992 |
|---|---|---|---|---|---|---|---|---|---|---|---|
| Giro d'Italia | 34 | — | — | — | — | — | 12 | — | — | — | — |
| Tour de France | 30 | 8 | 35 | 26 | — | 47 | 66 | 34 | — | 115 | 70 |
| Vuelta a España | — | — | — | — | — | — | — | — | — | — | — |
