= Jacques Michaud =

French cyclist

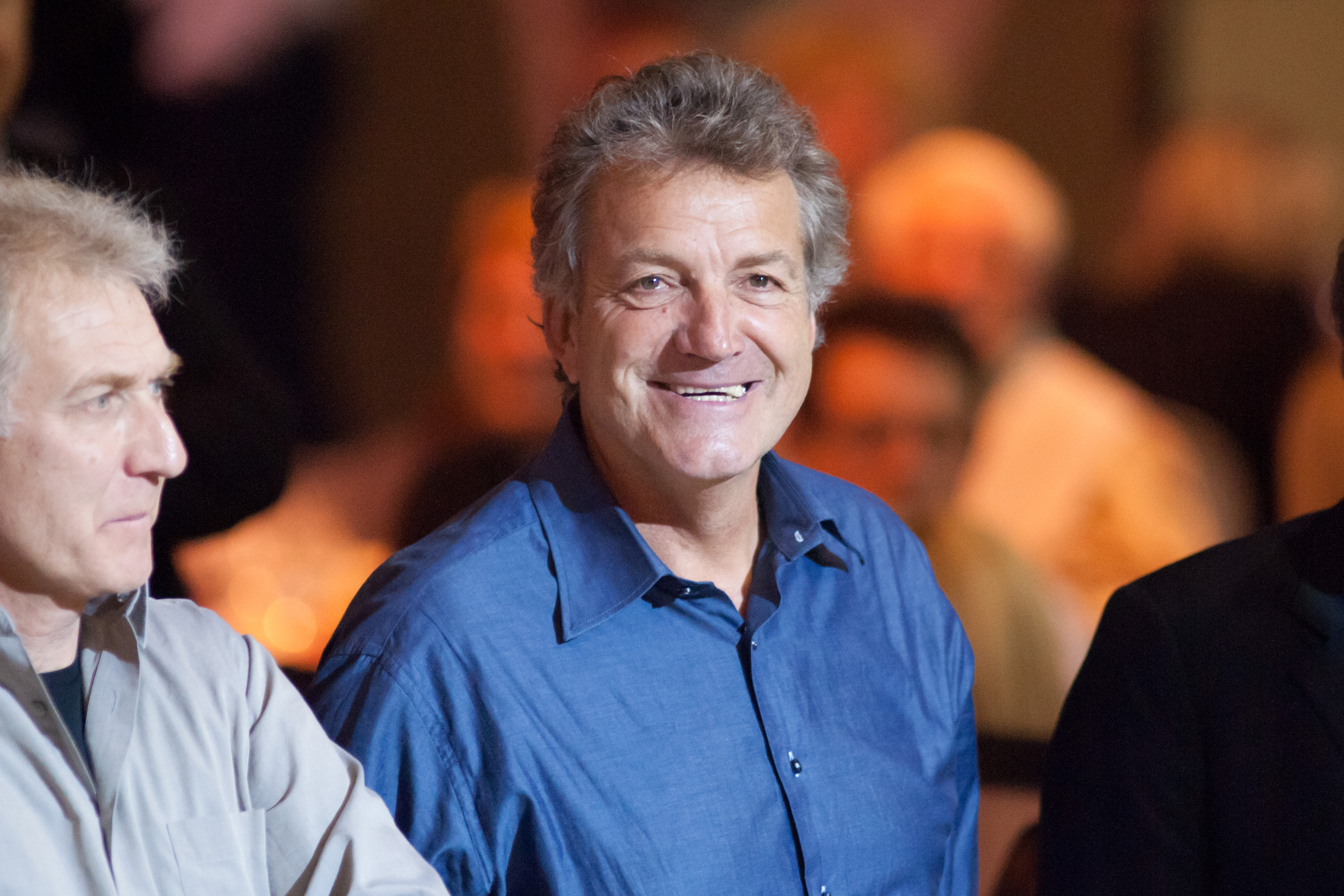

Personal information
- Full name: Jacques Michaud
- Born: 11 July 1951 (age 75) Saint-Julien-en-Genevois, France

Cycling career
- Sport: Cycling
- Discipline: Road
- Role: Rider

Major wins
- 1 stage 1983 Tour de France

Jacques Michaud (born 11 July 1951) is a French former professional road bicycle racer, who won the eighteenth stage in the 1983 Tour de France. In that stage, he climbed the Col des Aravis, the Col de la Colombière and the Col de Joux Plane first, and finished with an advantage of 66 seconds on the next cyclist.

Michaud rode the Tour de France five times; he completed the course all five times, and his best result in the general classification was 18th.

== Major results ==
1979
Étoile de Bessèges
1983
Tour de France:

Winner stage 18

Cluses
