= Pierre Le Bigaut =

French cyclist

Pierre Le Bigault
Personal information
- Full name: Pierre Le Bigaut
- Born: 17 September 1959 (age 67) Guémené-sur-Scorff, France

Cycling career
- Sport: Cycling
- Current team: Retired
- Discipline: Road
- Role: Rider

Pierre Le Bigaut (born 17 September 1959, in Guémené-sur-Scorff) is a former French professional road bicycle racer.

== Major results ==
1982
Circuit de l'Indre
1983
Tour de France:

Winner stage 14

Joigny
Brest
1988
Tour du Finistère
