= La Redoute (cycling team) =

French cycling team (1979–1985)

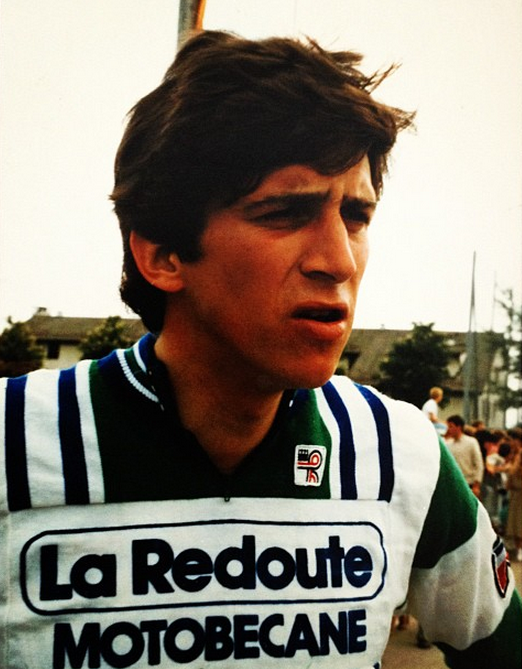
- Jean-Marie Michel in 1979

Team information
- Registered: France
- Founded: 1979
- Disbanded: 1985
- Discipline: Road

Team name history
- 1979–1983 1984–1985: La Redoute–Motobécane; La Redoute

La Redoute was a French professional cycling team that existed from 1979 to 1985. Its main sponsor was French mail order company La Redoute, with French bicycle manufacturer Motobécane a co-sponsor between 1979 and 1983.
