= Christian Jourdan =

French cyclist

Personal information
- Born: 31 December 1954 (age 71) Sainte-Foy-la-Grande, France

Cycling career
- Sport: Cycling
- Role: Rider

Christian Jourdan (born 31 December 1954) is a former French racing cyclist. He competed in the individual road race event at the 1976 Summer Olympics, and rode in eleven Grand Tours between 1979 and 1989.
