= List of teams and cyclists in the 1984 Tour de France =

List of cyclists

There was room for 18 teams in the 1984 Tour de France; in early 1984, there were 17 candidate teams. Although the Tour organisation approached AVP-Viditel and Metauromobili, an 18th team was not added. The 1984 Tour started with 170 cyclists, divided into 17 teams of 10 cyclists:

- Renault–Elf
- Reynolds
- Panasonic–Raleigh
- La Redoute
- Système U
- Skil–Reydel–Sem
- Peugeot–Shell–Michelin
- Sporting Lisboa–Raposeira
- Teka
- Mondial Moquette–Splendor
- Coop–Hoonved–Rossin
- Cilo–Aufina
- Kwantum–Decosol–Yoko
- La Vie Claire–Terraillon
- Colombia–Varta
- Europ Decor–Boule d'Or–Eddy Merckx
- Carrera–Inoxpran

== Start list ==
=== By team ===
Renault–Elf
No.	Rider	Pos.
1	Laurent Fignon (FRA)	1
2	Vincent Barteau (FRA)	28
3	Lucien Didier (LUX)	72
4	Dominique Gaigne (FRA)	121
5	Pascal Jules (FRA)	21
6	Marc Madiot (FRA)	35
7	Yvon Madiot (FRA)	46
8	Pierre-Henri Menthéour (FRA)	55
9	Pascal Poisson (FRA)	80
10	Greg LeMond (USA)	3

Reynolds
No.	Rider	Pos.
11	Ángel Arroyo (ESP)	6
12	Enrique Aja (ESP)	51
13	Pedro Delgado (ESP)	DNF
14	Julián Gorospe (ESP)	52
15	Anastasio Greciano (ESP)	87
16	Carlos Hernández Bailo (ESP)	53
17	Jesús Hernández Úbeda (ESP)	71
18	José Luis Laguía (ESP)	41
19	Celestino Prieto (ESP)	34
20	Jaime Vilamajó (ESP)	DNF

Panasonic–Raleigh
No.	Rider	Pos.
21	Phil Anderson (AUS)	10
22	Ludo De Keulenaer (BEL)	92
23	Theo de Rooij (NED)	59
24	Henk Lubberding (NED)	40
25	Guy Nulens (BEL)	24
26	Bert Oosterbosch (NED)	DNF
27	Eddy Planckaert (BEL)	DNF
28	Gerard Veldscholten (NED)	16
29	Eric Vanderaerden (BEL)	90
30	Peter Winnen (NED)	26

La Redoute
No.	Rider	Pos.
31	Stephen Roche (IRL)	25
32	Robert Alban (FRA)	38
33	Alain Bondue (FRA)	99
34	Etienne De Wilde (BEL)	DNF
35	Christian Levavasseur (FRA)	110
36	Paul Sherwen (GBR)	116
37	Jérôme Simon (FRA)	36
38	Régis Simon (FRA)	111
39	Jean-Luc Vandenbroucke (BEL)	DNF
40	Ferdi Van Den Haute (BEL)	106

Système U
No.	Rider	Pos.
41	Jean-René Bernaudeau (FRA)	DNF
42	Patrick Bonnet (FRA)	85
43	André Chappuis (FRA)	67
44	Marc Durant (FRA)	37
45	Yvan Frebert (FRA)	69
46	Graham Jones (GBR)	DNF
47	Martín Ramírez (COL)	DNF
48	Jean-François Rodriguez (FRA)	DNF
49	Christian Seznec (FRA)	DNF
50	Claude Vincendeau (FRA)	DNF

Skil–Reydel–Sem
No.	Rider	Pos.
51	Sean Kelly (IRL)	5
52	Jean-Claude Bagot (FRA)	DNF
53	Jonathan Boyer (USA)	31
54	Éric Caritoux (FRA)	14
55	Patrick Clerc (FRA)	79
56	Guy Gallopin (FRA)	63
57	Jean-Marie Grezet (SUI)	13
58	Gilles Mas (FRA)	29
59	Patrick Moerlen (SUI)	96
60	Frédéric Vichot (FRA)	23

Peugeot–Shell–Michelin
No.	Rider	Pos.
61	Pascal Simon (FRA)	7
62	Jacques Bossis (FRA)	102
63	Bernard Bourreau (FRA)	86
64	Frédéric Brun (FRA)	89
65	Francis Castaing (FRA)	105
66	Dominique Garde (FRA)	33
67	Hubert Linard (FRA)	112
68	Robert Millar (GBR)	4
69	Allan Peiper (AUS)	95
70	Sean Yates (GBR)	91

Sporting Lisboa–Raposeira
No.	Rider	Pos.
71	Marco Chagas (POR)	77
72	Michel Charréard (FRA)	117
73	Eduardo Correia (POR)	118
74	Alain Dithurbide (FRA)	83
75	Benedito Ferreira (POR)	DNF
76	Paulo Ferreira (POR)	DNF
77	Carlos Marta (POR)	122
78	Patrice Thévenard (FRA)	115
79	José Xavier (POR)	119
80	Manuel Zeferino (POR)	94

Teka
No.	Rider	Pos.
81	Pedro Muñoz Machín Rodríguez (ESP)	8
82	Bernardo Alfonsel (ESP)	98
83	Antonio Coll (ESP)	66
84	Edgar Corredor (COL)	DNF
85	Noël Dejonckheere (BEL)	DNF
86	Reimund Dietzen (FRG)	64
87	Federico Echave (ESP)	39
88	José Patrocinio Jiménez (COL)	15
89	René Martens (BEL)	68
90	Modesto Urrutibeazcoa (ESP)	120

Mondial Moquette–Splendor
No.	Rider	Pos.
91	Claude Criquielion (BEL)	9
92	Hendrik Devos (BEL)	88
93	Rudy Dhaenens (BEL)	DNF
94	Rudy Matthijs (BEL)	DNF
95	Francisco Rodríguez Maldonado (COL)	45
96	Rudy Rogiers (BEL)	DNF
97	Jean-Philippe Vandenbrande (BEL)	42
98	Gery Verlinden (BEL)	DNF
99	Patrick Versluys (BEL)	DNF
100	Pablo Wilches (COL)	DNF

Coop–Hoonved–Rossin
No.	Rider	Pos.
101	Kim Andersen (DEN)	50
102	Pierre Bazzo (FRA)	DNF
103	Serge Beucherie (FRA)	DNF
104	Régis Clère (FRA)	DNF
105	Jean-François Chaurin (FRA)	DNF
106	Jean-Luc Garnier (FRA)	DNF
107	Jean-Louis Gauthier (FRA)	97
108	Michel Laurent (FRA)	17
109	Pierre Le Bigaut (FRA)	44
110	Claude Moreau (FRA)	114

Cilo–Aufina
No.	Rider	Pos.
111	Beat Breu (SUI)	43
112	Thierry Bolle (SUI)	DNF
113	Serge Demierre (SUI)	DNF
114	Antonio Ferretti (SUI)	61
115	Bernard Gavillet (SUI)	20
116	Gilbert Glaus (SUI)	124
117	Erich Maechler (SUI)	84
118	Marcel Russenberger (SUI)	123
119	Julius Thalmann (SUI)	DNF
120	Urs Zimmermann (SUI)	58

Kwantum–Decosol–Yoko
No.	Rider	Pos.
121	Joop Zoetemelk (NED)	30
122	Jacques Hanegraaf (NED)	101
123	Hennie Kuiper (NED)	56
124	Henri Manders (NED)	107
125	Ludo Peeters (BEL)	57
126	Jan Raas (NED)	DNF
127	Adri van der Poel (NED)	DNF
128	Adri van Houwelingen (NED)	DNF
129	Leo van Vliet (NED)	75
130	Ad Wijnands (NED)	108

La Vie Claire–Terraillon
No.	Rider	Pos.
131	Bernard Hinault (FRA)	2
132	Dominique Arnaud (FRA)	54
133	Charly Bérard (FRA)	49
134	Christian Jourdan (FRA)	DNF
135	Maurice Le Guilloux (FRA)	62
136	Philippe Leleu (FRA)	DNF
137	Jean-François Rault (FRA)	82
138	Niki Rüttimann (SUI)	11
139	Bernard Vallet (FRA)	73
140	Alain Vigneron (FRA)	47

Colombia–Varta
No.	Rider	Pos.
141	Luis Herrera (COL)	27
142	Rafaël Antonio Acevedo (COL)	12
143	José Antonio Agudelo Gómez (COL)	19
144	Samuel Cabrera (COL)	32
145	Manuel Cárdenas Espitia (COL)	DNF
146	Israel Corredor (COL)	78
147	Alfonso Flórez Ortiz (COL)	18
148	Hermán Loaiza (COL)	60
149	José Alfonso López (COL)	65
150	Abelardo Ríos (COL)	DNF

Europ Decor–Boule d'Or–Eddy Merckx
No.	Rider	Pos.
151	Alfons De Wolf (BEL)	74
152	Marc Dierickx (BEL)	104
153	Luc Govaerts (BEL)	109
154	Paul Haghedooren (BEL)	DNF
155	Frank Hoste (BEL)	100
156	Gerrie Knetemann (NED)	103
157	Harald Maier (AUT)	DNF
158	Marc Sergeant (BEL)	48
159	Marc Somers (BEL)	DNF
160	Dirk Wayenberg (BEL)	DNF

Carrera–Inoxpran
No.	Rider	Pos.
161	Giovanni Battaglin (ITA)	DNF
162	Simone Fraccaro (ITA)	DNF
163	Czesław Lang (POL)	93
164	Bruno Leali (ITA)	76
165	Luciano Loro (ITA)	22
166	Valerio Lualdi (ITA)	113
167	Giancarlo Perini (ITA)	81
168	Glauco Santoni (ITA)	70
169	Carlo Tonon (ITA)	DNF
170	Roberto Visentini (ITA)	DNF

=== By rider ===
Legend
No.	Starting number worn by the rider during the Tour
Pos.	Position in the general classification
DNF	Denotes a rider who did not finish

No.	Name	Nationality	Team	Pos.	Time	Ref
1	Laurent Fignon	France	Renault–Elf	1	112h 03' 40"	
2	Vincent Barteau	France	Renault–Elf	28	+ 1h 00' 02"	
3	Lucien Didier	Luxembourg	Renault–Elf	72	+ 1h 56' 39"	
4	Dominique Gaigne	France	Renault–Elf	121	+ 3h 35' 39"	
5	Pascal Jules	France	Renault–Elf	21	+ 51' 53"	
6	Marc Madiot	France	Renault–Elf	35	+ 1h 13' 03"	
7	Yvon Madiot	France	Renault–Elf	46	+ 1h 29' 39"	
8	Pierre-Henri Menthéour	France	Renault–Elf	55	+ 1h 38' 51"	
9	Pascal Poisson	France	Renault–Elf	80	+ 2h 11' 37"	
10	Greg LeMond	United States	Renault–Elf	3	+ 11' 46"	
11	Ángel Arroyo	Spain	Reynolds	6	+ 19' 22"	
12	Enrique Aja	Spain	Reynolds	51	+ 1h 33' 53"	
13	Pedro Delgado	Spain	Reynolds	DNF	—	
14	Julián Gorospe	Spain	Reynolds	52	+ 1h 37' 23"	
15	Anastasio Greciano	Spain	Reynolds	87	+ 2h 20' 51"	
16	Carlos Hernández Bailo	Spain	Reynolds	53	+ 1h 37' 30"	
17	Jesús Hernández Úbeda	Spain	Reynolds	71	+ 1h 55' 17"	
18	José Luis Laguía	Spain	Reynolds	41	+ 1h 24' 02"	
19	Celestino Prieto	Spain	Reynolds	34	+ 1h 10' 23"	
20	Jaime Vilamajó	Spain	Reynolds	DNF	—	
21	Phil Anderson	Australia	Panasonic–Raleigh	10	+ 29' 16"	
22	Ludo De Keulenaer	Belgium	Panasonic–Raleigh	92	+ 2h 28' 49"	
23	Theo de Rooij	Netherlands	Panasonic–Raleigh	59	+ 1h 42' 20"	
24	Henk Lubberding	Netherlands	Panasonic–Raleigh	40	+ 1h 23' 52"	
25	Guy Nulens	Belgium	Panasonic–Raleigh	24	+ 53' 25"	
26	Bert Oosterbosch	Netherlands	Panasonic–Raleigh	DNF	—	
27	Eddy Planckaert	Belgium	Panasonic–Raleigh	DNF	—	
28	Gerard Veldscholten	Netherlands	Panasonic–Raleigh	16	+ 41' 54"	
29	Eric Vanderaerden	Belgium	Panasonic–Raleigh	90	+ 2h 26' 14"	
30	Peter Winnen	Netherlands	Panasonic–Raleigh	26	+ 58' 14"	
31	Stephen Roche	Ireland	La Redoute	25	+ 56' 36"	
32	Robert Alban	France	La Redoute	38	+ 1h 18' 03"	
33	Alain Bondue	France	La Redoute	99	+ 2h 36' 45"	
34	Etienne De Wilde	Belgium	La Redoute	DNF	—	
35	Christian Levavasseur	France	La Redoute	110	+ 3h 03' 04"	
36	Paul Sherwen	Great Britain	La Redoute	116	+ 3h 24' 48"	
37	Jérôme Simon	France	La Redoute	36	+ 1h 16' 33"	
38	Régis Simon	France	La Redoute	111	+ 3h 04' 25"	
39	Jean-Luc Vandenbroucke	Belgium	La Redoute	DNF	—	
40	Ferdi Van Den Haute	Belgium	La Redoute	106	+ 2h 52' 48"	
41	Jean-René Bernaudeau	France	Système U	DNF	—	
42	Patrick Bonnet	France	Système U	85	+ 2h 17' 18"	
43	André Chappuis	France	Système U	67	+ 1h 52' 04"	
44	Marc Durant	France	Système U	37	+ 1h 17' 22"	
45	Yvan Frebert	France	Système U	69	+ 1h 53' 58"	
46	Graham Jones	Great Britain	Système U	DNF	—	
47	Martín Ramírez	Colombia	Système U	DNF	—	
48	Jean-François Rodriguez	France	Système U	DNF	—	
49	Christian Seznec	France	Système U	DNF	—	
50	Claude Vincendeau	France	Système U	DNF	—	
51	Sean Kelly	Ireland	Skil–Reydel–Sem	5	+ 16' 35"	
52	Jean-Claude Bagot	France	Skil–Reydel–Sem	DNF	—	
53	Jonathan Boyer	United States	Skil–Reydel–Sem	31	+ 1h 07' 03"	
54	Éric Caritoux	France	Skil–Reydel–Sem	14	+ 36' 28"	
55	Patrick Clerc	France	Skil–Reydel–Sem	79	+ 2h 11' 29"	
56	Guy Gallopin	France	Skil–Reydel–Sem	63	+ 1h 49' 07"	
57	Jean-Marie Grezet	Switzerland	Skil–Reydel–Sem	13	+ 33' 41"	
58	Gilles Mas	France	Skil–Reydel–Sem	29	+ 1h 05' 38"	
59	Patrick Moerlen	Switzerland	Skil–Reydel–Sem	96	+ 2h 31' 33"	
60	Frédéric Vichot	France	Skil–Reydel–Sem	23	+ 53' 18"	
61	Pascal Simon	France	Peugeot–Shell–Michelin	7	+ 21' 17"	
62	Jacques Bossis	France	Peugeot–Shell–Michelin	102	+ 2h 44' 26"	
63	Bernard Bourreau	France	Peugeot–Shell–Michelin	86	+ 2h 20' 29"	
64	Frédéric Brun	France	Peugeot–Shell–Michelin	89	+ 2h 25' 08"	
65	Francis Castaing	France	Peugeot–Shell–Michelin	105	+ 2h 51' 59"	
66	Dominique Garde	France	Peugeot–Shell–Michelin	33	+ 1h 09' 58"	
67	Hubert Linard	France	Peugeot–Shell–Michelin	112	+ 3h 06' 24"	
68	Robert Millar	Great Britain	Peugeot–Shell–Michelin	4	+ 14' 42"	
69	Allan Peiper	Australia	Peugeot–Shell–Michelin	95	+ 2h 31' 28"	
70	Sean Yates	Great Britain	Peugeot–Shell–Michelin	91	+ 2h 26' 41"	
71	Marco Chagas	Portugal	Sporting Lisboa–Raposeira	77	+ 2h 08' 15"	
72	Michel Charréard	France	Sporting Lisboa–Raposeira	117	+ 3h 25' 18"	
73	Eduardo Correia	Portugal	Sporting Lisboa–Raposeira	118	+ 3h 25' 37"	
74	Alain Dithurbide	France	Sporting Lisboa–Raposeira	83	+ 2h 13' 02"	
75	Benedito Ferreira	Portugal	Sporting Lisboa–Raposeira	DNF	—	
76	Paulo Ferreira	Portugal	Sporting Lisboa–Raposeira	DNF	—	
77	Carlos Marta	Portugal	Sporting Lisboa–Raposeira	122	+ 3h 40' 05"	
78	Patrice Thévenard	France	Sporting Lisboa–Raposeira	115	+ 3h 09' 16"	
79	José Xavier	Portugal	Sporting Lisboa–Raposeira	119	+ 3h 27' 26"	
80	Manuel Zeferino	Portugal	Sporting Lisboa–Raposeira	94	+ 2h 29' 26"	
81	Pedro Muñoz Machín Rodríguez	Spain	Teka	8	+ 26' 17"	
82	Bernardo Alfonsel	Spain	Teka	98	+ 2h 35' 25"	
83	Antonio Coll	Spain	Teka	66	+ 1h 52' 04"	
84	Edgar Corredor	Colombia	Teka	DNF	—	
85	Noël Dejonckheere	Belgium	Teka	DNF	—	
86	Reimund Dietzen	West Germany	Teka	64	+ 1h 49' 31"	
87	Federico Echave	Spain	Teka	39	+ 1h 22' 59"	
88	José Patrocinio Jiménez	Colombia	Teka	15	+ 37' 49"	
89	René Martens	Belgium	Teka	68	+ 1h 52' 25"	
90	Modesto Urrutibeazcoa	Spain	Teka	120	+ 3h 30' 11"	
91	Claude Criquielion	Belgium	Mondial Moquette–Splendor	9	+ 29' 12"	
92	Hendrik Devos	Belgium	Mondial Moquette–Splendor	88	+ 2h 23' 55"	
93	Rudy Dhaenens	Belgium	Mondial Moquette–Splendor	DNF	—	
94	Rudy Matthijs	Belgium	Mondial Moquette–Splendor	DNF	—	
95	Francisco Rodríguez Maldonado	Colombia	Mondial Moquette–Splendor	45	+ 1h 28' 35"	
96	Rudy Rogiers	Belgium	Mondial Moquette–Splendor	DNF	—	
97	Jean-Philippe Vandenbrande	Belgium	Mondial Moquette–Splendor	42	+ 1h 24' 13"	
98	Gery Verlinden	Belgium	Mondial Moquette–Splendor	DNF	—	
99	Patrick Versluys	Belgium	Mondial Moquette–Splendor	DNF	—	
100	Pablo Wilches	Colombia	Mondial Moquette–Splendor	DNF	—	
101	Kim Andersen	Denmark	Coop–Hoonved–Rossin	50	+ 1h 33' 23"	
102	Pierre Bazzo	France	Coop–Hoonved–Rossin	DNF	—	
103	Serge Beucherie	France	Coop–Hoonved–Rossin	DNF	—	
104	Régis Clère	France	Coop–Hoonved–Rossin	DNF	—	
105	Jean-François Chaurin	France	Coop–Hoonved–Rossin	DNF	—	
106	Jean-Luc Garnier	France	Coop–Hoonved–Rossin	DNF	—	
107	Jean-Louis Gauthier	France	Coop–Hoonved–Rossin	97	+ 2h 34' 10"	
108	Michel Laurent	France	Coop–Hoonved–Rossin	17	+ 44' 33"	
109	Pierre Le Bigaut	France	Coop–Hoonved–Rossin	44	+ 1h 26' 51"	
110	Claude Moreau	France	Coop–Hoonved–Rossin	114	+ 3h 07' 34"	
111	Beat Breu	Switzerland	Cilo–Aufina	43	+ 1h 25' 21"	
112	Thierry Bolle	Switzerland	Cilo–Aufina	DNF	—	
113	Serge Demierre	Switzerland	Cilo–Aufina	DNF	—	
114	Antonio Ferretti	Switzerland	Cilo–Aufina	61	+ 1h 47' 24"	
115	Bernard Gavillet	Switzerland	Cilo–Aufina	20	+ 51' 02"	
116	Gilbert Glaus	Switzerland	Cilo–Aufina	124	+ 4h 01' 17"	
117	Erich Maechler	Switzerland	Cilo–Aufina	84	+ 2h 15' 23"	
118	Marcel Russenberger	Switzerland	Cilo–Aufina	123	+ 4h 00' 30"	
119	Julius Thalmann	Switzerland	Cilo–Aufina	DNF	—	
120	Urs Zimmermann	Switzerland	Cilo–Aufina	58	+ 1h 40' 39"	
121	Joop Zoetemelk	Netherlands	Kwantum–Decosol–Yoko	30	+ 1h 06' 02"	
122	Jacques Hanegraaf	Netherlands	Kwantum–Decosol–Yoko	101	+ 2h 44' 04"	
123	Hennie Kuiper	Netherlands	Kwantum–Decosol–Yoko	56	+ 1h 39' 30"	
124	Henri Manders	Netherlands	Kwantum–Decosol–Yoko	107	+ 2h 59' 01"	
125	Ludo Peeters	Belgium	Kwantum–Decosol–Yoko	57	+ 1h 39' 59"	
126	Jan Raas	Netherlands	Kwantum–Decosol–Yoko	DNF	—	
127	Adri van der Poel	Netherlands	Kwantum–Decosol–Yoko	DNF	—	
128	Adri van Houwelingen	Netherlands	Kwantum–Decosol–Yoko	DNF	—	
129	Leo van Vliet	Netherlands	Kwantum–Decosol–Yoko	75	+ 1h 58' 52"	
130	Ad Wijnands	Netherlands	Kwantum–Decosol–Yoko	108	+ 3h 01' 04"	
131	Bernard Hinault	France	La Vie Claire–Terraillon	2	+ 10' 32"	
132	Dominique Arnaud	France	La Vie Claire–Terraillon	54	+ 1h 37' 50"	
133	Charly Bérard	France	La Vie Claire–Terraillon	49	+ 1h 33' 15"	
134	Christian Jourdan	France	La Vie Claire–Terraillon	DNF	—	
135	Maurice Le Guilloux	France	La Vie Claire–Terraillon	62	+ 1h 48' 38"	
136	Philippe Leleu	France	La Vie Claire–Terraillon	DNF	—	
137	Jean-François Rault	France	La Vie Claire–Terraillon	82	+ 2h 12' 17"	
138	Niki Rüttimann	Switzerland	La Vie Claire–Terraillon	11	+ 30' 58"	
139	Bernard Vallet	France	La Vie Claire–Terraillon	73	+ 1h 58' 23"	
140	Alain Vigneron	France	La Vie Claire–Terraillon	47	+ 1h 29' 49"	
141	Luis Herrera	Colombia	Colombia–Varta	27	+ 58' 30"	
142	Rafaël Antonio Acevedo	Colombia	Colombia–Varta	12	+ 33' 32"	
143	José Antonio Agudelo Gómez	Colombia	Colombia–Varta	19	+ 49' 25"	
144	Samuel Cabrera	Colombia	Colombia–Varta	32	+ 1h 07' 17"	
145	Manuel Cárdenas Espitia	Colombia	Colombia–Varta	DNF	—	
146	Israel Corredor	Colombia	Colombia–Varta	78	+ 2h 09' 31"	
147	Alfonso Flórez Ortiz	Colombia	Colombia–Varta	18	+ 45' 33"	
148	Hermán Loayza	Colombia	Colombia–Varta	60	+ 1h 43' 55"	
149	José Alfonso López	Colombia	Colombia–Varta	65	+ 1h 49' 59"	
150	Abelardo Ríos	Colombia	Colombia–Varta	DNF	—	
151	Alfons De Wolf	Belgium	Europ Decor–Boule d'Or–Eddy Merckx	74	+ 1h 58' 36"	
152	Marc Dierickx	Belgium	Europ Decor–Boule d'Or–Eddy Merckx	104	+ 2h 49' 20"	
153	Luc Govaerts	Belgium	Europ Decor–Boule d'Or–Eddy Merckx	109	+ 3h 01' 39"	
154	Paul Haghedooren	Belgium	Europ Decor–Boule d'Or–Eddy Merckx	DNF	—	
155	Frank Hoste	Belgium	Europ Decor–Boule d'Or–Eddy Merckx	100	+ 2h 38' 08"	
156	Gerrie Knetemann	Netherlands	Europ Decor–Boule d'Or–Eddy Merckx	103	+ 2h 47' 58"	
157	Harald Maier	Austria	Europ Decor–Boule d'Or–Eddy Merckx	DNF	—	
158	Marc Sergeant	Belgium	Europ Decor–Boule d'Or–Eddy Merckx	48	+ 1h 31' 13"	
159	Marc Somers	Belgium	Europ Decor–Boule d'Or–Eddy Merckx	DNF	—	
160	Dirk Wayenberg	Belgium	Europ Decor–Boule d'Or–Eddy Merckx	DNF	—	
161	Giovanni Battaglin	Italy	Carrera–Inoxpran	DNF	—	
162	Simone Fraccaro	Italy	Carrera–Inoxpran	DNF	—	
163	Czesław Lang	Poland	Carrera–Inoxpran	93	+ 2h 29' 21"	
164	Bruno Leali	Italy	Carrera–Inoxpran	76	+ 2h 03' 40"	
165	Luciano Loro	Italy	Carrera–Inoxpran	22	+ 52' 37"	
166	Valerio Lualdi	Italy	Carrera–Inoxpran	113	+ 3h 06' 50"	
167	Giancarlo Perini	Italy	Carrera–Inoxpran	81	+ 2h 12' 08"	
168	Glauco Santoni	Italy	Carrera–Inoxpran	70	+ 1h 54' 28"	
169	Carlo Tonon	Italy	Carrera–Inoxpran	DNF	—	
170	Roberto Visentini	Italy	Carrera–Inoxpran	DNF	—	
