= 1984 Vuelta a España, Prologue to Stage 10 =

Cycling race stages

The 1984 Vuelta a España was the 39th edition of the Vuelta a España, one of cycling's Grand Tours. The Vuelta began in Jerez de la Frontera, with a prologue individual time trial on 17 April, and Stage 10 occurred on 27 April with a stage to Burgos. The race finished in Madrid on 6 May.

== Prologue ==
17 April 1984 — Jerez de la Frontera, 6.6 km (4.1 mi) (ITT)

Prologue result and general classification after Prologue

Rank	Rider	Team	Time
1	Francesco Moser (ITA)	Gis Gelati–Tuc Lu	8' 08"
2	Pello Ruiz Cabestany (ESP)	Orbea–Danena	+ 9"
3	Jesús Blanco Villar (ESP)	Teka	+ 11"
4	Julián Gorospe (ESP)	Reynolds	+ 13"
5	Giuseppe Petito (ITA)	Alfa Lum–Olmo	+ 17"
6	Luc Colijn (BEL)	Safir–Van de Ven	+ 18"
7	José Recio (ESP)	Kelme	+ 20"
8	Jaime Vilamajó (ESP)	Reynolds	+ 24"
9	Alberto Fernández (ESP)	Zor–Gemeaz Cusin	+ 26"
10	Marino Lejarreta (ESP)	Alfa Lum–Olmo	s.t.

== Stage 1 ==
18 April 1984 — Jerez de la Frontera to Málaga, 272 km (169 mi)

Stage 1 result

Rank	Rider	Team	Time
1	Noël Dejonckheere (BEL)	Teka	8h 15' 20"
2	Guido Van Calster (BEL)	Del Tongo–Colnago	s.t.
3	Roger De Vlaeminck (BEL)	Gis Gelati–Tuc Lu	s.t.
4	Benny Van Brabant (BEL)	Tönissteiner–Lotto–Mavic	s.t.
5	Francesco Moser (ITA)	Gis Gelati–Tuc Lu	s.t.
6	Jesús Suárez Cueva (ESP)	Hueso	s.t.
7	Domenico Perani (ITA)	Alfa Lum–Olmo	s.t.
8	Yvon Bertin (FRA)	Dormilón	s.t.
9	Sabino Angoitia (ESP)	Hueso	s.t.
10	Giuseppe Martinelli (ITA)	Alfa Lum–Olmo	s.t.

General classification after Stage 1

Rank	Rider	Team	Time
1	Francesco Moser (ITA)	Gis Gelati–Tuc Lu	8h 23' 28"
2	Pello Ruiz Cabestany (ESP)	Orbea–Danena	+ 9"
3	Jesús Blanco Villar (ESP)	Teka	+ 11"
4	Julián Gorospe (ESP)	Reynolds	+ 13"
5	Giuseppe Petito (ITA)	Alfa Lum–Olmo	+ 17"
6	Luc Colijn (BEL)	Safir–Van de Ven	+ 18"
7	José Recio (ESP)	Kelme	+ 20"
8	Jaime Vilamajó (ESP)	Reynolds	+ 24"
9	Alberto Fernández (ESP)	Zor–Gemeaz Cusin	+ 26"
10	Marino Lejarreta (ESP)	Alfa Lum–Olmo	s.t.

== Stage 2 ==
19 April 1984 — Málaga to Almería, 202 km (126 mi)

Stage 2 result

Rank	Rider	Team	Time
1	Guido Van Calster (BEL)	Del Tongo–Colnago	5h 18' 16"
2	Roger De Vlaeminck (BEL)	Gis Gelati–Tuc Lu	s.t.
3	Benny Van Brabant (BEL)	Tönissteiner–Lotto–Mavic	s.t.
4	Werner Devos (BEL)	Safir–Van de Ven	s.t.
5	Luc De Decker (BEL)	Safir–Van de Ven	s.t.
6	Jozef Lieckens (BEL)	Safir–Van de Ven	s.t.
7	Marc Goossens (BEL)	Tönissteiner–Lotto–Mavic	s.t.
8	Palmiro Masciarelli (ITA)	Gis Gelati–Tuc Lu	s.t.

General classification after Stage 2

Rank	Rider	Team	Time
1	Francesco Moser (ITA)	Gis Gelati–Tuc Lu	13h 41' 44"
2	Pello Ruiz Cabestany (ESP)	Orbea–Danena	+ 9"
3	Jesús Blanco Villar (ESP)	Teka	+ 11"
4	Julián Gorospe (ESP)	Reynolds	+ 13"
5	Giuseppe Petito (ITA)	Alfa Lum–Olmo	+ 17"
6	Luc Colijn (BEL)	Safir–Van de Ven	+ 18"
7	José Recio (ESP)	Kelme	+ 20"
8	Jaime Vilamajó (ESP)	Reynolds	+ 24"
9	Alberto Fernández (ESP)	Zor–Gemeaz Cusin	+ 26"
10	Marino Lejarreta (ESP)	Alfa Lum–Olmo	s.t.

== Stage 3 ==
20 April 1984 — Mojácar to Elche, 204 km (127 mi)

Stage 3 result

Rank	Rider	Team	Time
1	Jozef Lieckens (BEL)	Safir–Van de Ven	5h 39' 13"
2	Noël Dejonckheere (BEL)	Teka	s.t.
3	Roger De Vlaeminck (BEL)	Gis Gelati–Tuc Lu	s.t.
4	Guido Van Calster (BEL)	Del Tongo–Colnago	s.t.
5	Jesús Suárez Cueva (ESP)	Hueso	s.t.
6	Robert D'Hont (BEL)	Safir–Van de Ven	s.t.
7	Patrizio Gambirasio (ITA)	Gis Gelati–Tuc Lu	s.t.
8	Marc Goossens (BEL)	Tönissteiner–Lotto–Mavic	s.t.
9	Imanol Murga (ESP)	Orbea–Danena	s.t.
10	Marco Vitali (ITA)	Del Tongo–Colnago	s.t.

General classification after Stage 3

Rank	Rider	Team	Time
1	Francesco Moser (ITA)	Gis Gelati–Tuc Lu	
2	Pello Ruiz Cabestany (ESP)	Orbea–Danena	+ 9"
3	Jesús Blanco Villar (ESP)	Teka	+ 11"

== Stage 4 ==
21 April 1984 — Elche to Valencia, 197 km (122 mi)

Stage 4 result

Rank	Rider	Team	Time
1	Noël Dejonckheere (BEL)	Teka	4h 56' 23"
2	Roger De Vlaeminck (BEL)	Gis Gelati–Tuc Lu	s.t.
3	Guido Van Calster (BEL)	Del Tongo–Colnago	s.t.
4	Jozef Lieckens (BEL)	Safir–Van de Ven	s.t.
5	Miguel Ángel Iglesias (ESP)	Kelme	s.t.
6	Daniel Rossel (BEL)	Tönissteiner–Lotto–Mavic	s.t.
7	Jesús Suárez Cueva (ESP)	Hueso	s.t.
8	Marco Vitali (ITA)	Del Tongo–Colnago	s.t.
9	Guy Gallopin (FRA)	Skil–Reydel–Sem–Mavic	s.t.
10	Yvon Bertin (FRA)	Dormilón	s.t.

General classification after Stage 4

Rank	Rider	Team	Time
1	Francesco Moser (ITA)	Gis Gelati–Tuc Lu	24h 17' 20"
2	Pello Ruiz Cabestany (ESP)	Orbea–Danena	+ 9"
3	Jesús Blanco Villar (ESP)	Teka	+ 11"
4	Julián Gorospe (ESP)	Reynolds	+ 13"
5	Giuseppe Petito (ITA)	Alfa Lum–Olmo	+ 17"
6	Luc Colijn (BEL)	Safir–Van de Ven	+ 18"
7	José Recio (ESP)	Kelme	+ 20"
8	Jaime Vilamajó (ESP)	Reynolds	+ 24"
9	Alberto Fernández (ESP)	Zor–Gemeaz Cusin	+ 26"
10	Marino Lejarreta (ESP)	Alfa Lum–Olmo	s.t.

== Stage 5 ==
22 April 1984 — Valencia to Salou, 245 km (152 mi)

Stage 5 result

Rank	Rider	Team	Time
1	Jozef Lieckens (BEL)	Safir–Van de Ven	6h 22' 09"
2	Francesco Moser (ITA)	Gis Gelati–Tuc Lu	s.t.
3	Marco Vitali (ITA)	Del Tongo–Colnago	s.t.
4	Rudy Pevenage (BEL)	Del Tongo–Colnago	s.t.
5	Yvon Bertin (FRA)	Dormilón	s.t.
6	Sabino Angoitia (ESP)	Hueso	s.t.
7	Miguel Ángel Iglesias (ESP)	Kelme	s.t.
8	Jan Wijnants (BEL)	Tönissteiner–Lotto–Mavic	s.t.
9	Mariano Bayon Magdaleno (ESP)	Dormilón	s.t.
10	Philippe Poissonnier (FRA)	Skil–Reydel–Sem–Mavic	s.t.

General classification after Stage 5

Rank	Rider	Team	Time
1	Francesco Moser (ITA)	Gis Gelati–Tuc Lu	30h 39' 29"
2	José Recio (ESP)	Kelme	+ 20"
3	Jaime Vilamajó (ESP)	Reynolds	+ 24"
4	Alberto Fernández (ESP)	Zor–Gemeaz Cusin	+ 26"
5	Marino Lejarreta (ESP)	Alfa Lum–Olmo	s.t.
6	Nico Emonds (BEL)	Teka	+ 27"
7	Pedro Delgado (ESP)	Reynolds	+ 28"
8	Isidro Juárez (ESP)	Hueso	+ 32"
9	Reimund Dietzen (FRG)	Teka	s.t.
10	Jozef Lieckens (BEL)	Safir–Van de Ven	+ 33"

== Stage 6 ==
23 April 1984 — Salou to Sant Quirze del Vallès, 113 km (70 mi)

Stage 6 result

Rank	Rider	Team	Time
1	Michel Pollentier (BEL)	Safir–Van de Ven	3h 04' 01"
2	José Luis Laguía (ESP)	Reynolds	s.t.
3	Marco Vitali (ITA)	Del Tongo–Colnago	s.t.
4	Jozef Lieckens (BEL)	Safir–Van de Ven	+ 5"
5	Noël Dejonckheere (BEL)	Teka	s.t.
6	Benny Van Brabant (BEL)	Tönissteiner–Lotto–Mavic	s.t.
7	Guido Van Calster (BEL)	Del Tongo–Colnago	s.t.
8	Jesús Suárez Cueva (ESP)	Hueso	s.t.
9	Marc Goossens (BEL)	Tönissteiner–Lotto–Mavic	s.t.
10	Domenico Perani (ITA)	Alfa Lum–Olmo	s.t.

General classification after Stage 6

Rank	Rider	Team	Time
1	Francesco Moser (ITA)	Gis Gelati–Tuc Lu	33h 43' 34"
2	José Recio (ESP)	Kelme	+ 20"
3	Jaime Vilamajó (ESP)	Reynolds	+ 24"
4	Alberto Fernández (ESP)	Zor–Gemeaz Cusin	+ 26"
5	Marino Lejarreta (ESP)	Alfa Lum–Olmo	s.t.
6	Nico Emonds (BEL)	Teka	+ 27"
7	Pedro Delgado (ESP)	Reynolds	+ 28"
8	Isidro Juárez (ESP)	Hueso	+ 32"
9	Reimund Dietzen (FRG)	Teka	s.t.
10	Jozef Lieckens (BEL)	Safir–Van de Ven	+ 33"

== Stage 7 ==
24 April 1984 — Sant Quirze del Vallès to Rasos de Peguera, 184 km (114 mi)

Stage 7 result

Rank	Rider	Team	Time
1	Éric Caritoux (FRA)	Skil–Reydel–Sem–Mavic	5h 42' 46"
2	Pedro Delgado (ESP)	Reynolds	+ 16"
3	Edgar Corredor (COL)	Teka	+ 27"
4	José Patrocinio Jiménez (COL)	Teka	+ 31"
5	Alberto Fernández (ESP)	Zor–Gemeaz Cusin	+ 59"
6	Eduardo Chozas (ESP)	Zor–Gemeaz Cusin	+ 1' 11"
7	Nico Emonds (BEL)	Teka	+ 1' 36"
8	Faustino Rupérez (ESP)	Zor–Gemeaz Cusin	+ 1' 49"
9	Reimund Dietzen (FRG)	Teka	+ 1' 54"
10	Michel Pollentier (BEL)	Safir–Van de Ven	+ 2' 52"

General classification after Stage 7

Rank	Rider	Team	Time
1	Pedro Delgado (ESP)	Reynolds	39h 27' 04"
2	Éric Caritoux (FRA)	Skil–Reydel–Sem–Mavic	+ 11"
3	Edgar Corredor (COL)	Teka	+ 18"
4	José Patrocinio Jiménez (COL)	Teka	+ 38"
5	Alberto Fernández (ESP)	Zor–Gemeaz Cusin	+ 41"
6	Eduardo Chozas (ESP)	Zor–Gemeaz Cusin	+ 1' 01"
7	Nico Emonds (BEL)	Teka	+ 1' 21"
8	Reimund Dietzen (FRG)	Teka	+ 1' 42"
9	Michel Pollentier (BEL)	Safir–Van de Ven	+ 2' 43"
10	Faustino Rupérez (ESP)	Zor–Gemeaz Cusin	+ 2' 47"

== Stage 8 ==
25 April 1984 — Cardona to Zaragoza, 269 km (167 mi)

Stage 8 result

Rank	Rider	Team	Time
1	Roger De Vlaeminck (BEL)	Gis Gelati–Tuc Lu	6h 42' 00"
2	Guido Van Calster (BEL)	Del Tongo–Colnago	+ 6"
3	Noël Dejonckheere (BEL)	Teka	s.t.
4	Miguel Ángel Iglesias (ESP)	Kelme	s.t.
5	Benny Van Brabant (BEL)	Tönissteiner–Lotto–Mavic	s.t.
6	Francesco Moser (ITA)	Gis Gelati–Tuc Lu	s.t.
7	Jozef Lieckens (BEL)	Safir–Van de Ven	s.t.
8	Jesús Suárez Cueva (ESP)	Hueso	s.t.
9	Pello Ruiz Cabestany (ESP)	Orbea–Danena	s.t.
10	Giuseppe Martinelli (ITA)	Alfa Lum–Olmo	s.t.

General classification after Stage 8

Rank	Rider	Team	Time
1	Pedro Delgado (ESP)	Reynolds	46h 09' 25"
2	Edgar Corredor (COL)	Teka	+ 3"
3	Éric Caritoux (FRA)	Skil–Reydel–Sem–Mavic	+ 11"
4	José Patrocinio Jiménez (COL)	Teka	+ 38"
5	Alberto Fernández (ESP)	Zor–Gemeaz Cusin	+ 41"
6	Eduardo Chozas (ESP)	Zor–Gemeaz Cusin	+ 1' 01"
7	Nico Emonds (BEL)	Teka	+ 1' 21"
8	Reimund Dietzen (FRG)	Teka	+ 1' 42"
9	Michel Pollentier (BEL)	Safir–Van de Ven	+ 2' 28"
10	Faustino Rupérez (ESP)	Zor–Gemeaz Cusin	+ 2' 47"

== Stage 9 ==
26 April 1984 — Zaragoza to Soria, 159 km (99 mi)

Stage 9 result

Rank	Rider	Team	Time
1	Orlando Maini (ITA)	Alfa Lum–Olmo	3h 43' 32"
2	Ángel de las Heras (ESP)	Hueso	s.t.
3	Pello Ruiz Cabestany (ESP)	Orbea–Danena	+ 4' 28"
4	José Recio (ESP)	Kelme	+ 4' 37"
5	Salvatore Maccali (ITA)	Alfa Lum–Olmo	s.t.
6	Jean-Claude Bagot (ITA)	Skil–Reydel–Sem–Mavic	s.t.
7	Jozef Lieckens (BEL)	Safir–Van de Ven	s.t.
8	Benny Van Brabant (BEL)	Tönissteiner–Lotto–Mavic	s.t.
9	Noël Dejonckheere (BEL)	Teka	s.t.
10	Guido Van Calster (BEL)	Del Tongo–Colnago	s.t.

General classification after Stage 9

Rank	Rider	Team	Time
1	Pedro Delgado (ESP)	Reynolds	49h 57' 34"
2	Edgar Corredor (COL)	Teka	+ 3"
3	Éric Caritoux (FRA)	Skil–Reydel–Sem–Mavic	+ 11"
4	José Patrocinio Jiménez (COL)	Teka	+ 38"
5	Alberto Fernández (ESP)	Zor–Gemeaz Cusin	+ 41"
6	Eduardo Chozas (ESP)	Zor–Gemeaz Cusin	+ 1' 01"
7	Nico Emonds (BEL)	Teka	+ 1' 21"
8	Reimund Dietzen (FRG)	Teka	+ 1' 42"
9	Michel Pollentier (BEL)	Safir–Van de Ven	+ 2' 28"
10	Faustino Rupérez (ESP)	Zor–Gemeaz Cusin	+ 2' 47"

== Stage 10 ==
27 April 1984 — Soria to Burgos, 148 km (92 mi)

Stage 10 result

Rank	Rider	Team	Time
1	Palmiro Masciarelli (ITA)	Gis Gelati–Tuc Lu	3h 13' 09"
2	Giuseppe Martinelli (ITA)	Alfa Lum–Olmo	+ 2' 55"
3	Noël Dejonckheere (BEL)	Teka	s.t.
4	Domenico Perani (ITA)	Alfa Lum–Olmo	s.t.
5	Salvatore Maccali (ITA)	Alfa Lum–Olmo	s.t.
6	Marc Goossens (BEL)	Tönissteiner–Lotto–Mavic	s.t.
7	Marc Van Geel (BEL)	Safir–Van de Ven	s.t.
8	Miguel Ángel Iglesias (ESP)	Kelme	s.t.
9	Giuseppe Petito (ITA)	Alfa Lum–Olmo	s.t.
10	Danny Van Baelen (BEL)	Tönissteiner–Lotto–Mavic	s.t.

General classification after Stage 10

Rank	Rider	Team	Time
1	Pedro Delgado (ESP)	Reynolds	53h 13' 38"
2	Edgar Corredor (COL)	Teka	+ 3"
3	Éric Caritoux (FRA)	Skil–Reydel–Sem–Mavic	+ 11"
4	José Patrocinio Jiménez (COL)	Teka	+ 38"
5	Alberto Fernández (ESP)	Zor–Gemeaz Cusin	+ 41"
6	Eduardo Chozas (ESP)	Zor–Gemeaz Cusin	+ 1' 01"
7	Nico Emonds (BEL)	Teka	+ 1' 21"
8	Reimund Dietzen (FRG)	Teka	+ 1' 42"
9	Michel Pollentier (BEL)	Safir–Van de Ven	+ 2' 28"
10	Faustino Rupérez (ESP)	Zor–Gemeaz Cusin	+ 2' 47"
