= 1984 Vuelta a España, Stage 11 to Stage 19 =

Cycling race stages

The 1984 Vuelta a España was the 39th edition of the Vuelta a España, one of cycling's Grand Tours. The Vuelta began in Jerez de la Frontera, with a prologue individual time trial on 17 April, and Stage 11 occurred on 28 April with a stage from Burgos. The race finished in Madrid on 6 May.

== Stage 11 ==
28 April 1984 — Burgos to Santander, 182 km (113 mi)

Stage 11 result

Rank	Rider	Team	Time
1	Francesco Moser (ITA)	Gis Gelati–Tuc Lu	4h 36' 16"
2	Salvatore Maccali (ITA)	Alfa Lum–Olmo	s.t.
3	Guido Van Calster (BEL)	Del Tongo–Colnago	s.t.
4	Pello Ruiz Cabestany (ESP)	Orbea–Danena	s.t.
5	Juan-Carlos Alonso (ESP)	Alfa Lum–Olmo	s.t.
6	Imanol Murga (ESP)	Orbea–Danena	s.t.
7	Enrique Aja (ESP)	Reynolds	s.t.
8	Reimund Dietzen (FRG)	Teka	s.t.
9	José Luis Laguía (ESP)	Reynolds	s.t.
10	Pedro Delgado (ESP)	Reynolds	s.t.

General classification after Stage 11

Rank	Rider	Team	Time
1	Pedro Delgado (ESP)	Reynolds	57h 49' 54"
2	Edgar Corredor (COL)	Teka	+ 3"
3	Éric Caritoux (FRA)	Skil–Reydel–Sem–Mavic	+ 11"
4	José Patrocinio Jiménez (COL)	Teka	+ 38"
5	Alberto Fernández (ESP)	Zor–Gemeaz Cusin	+ 41"
6	Eduardo Chozas (ESP)	Zor–Gemeaz Cusin	+ 1' 01"
7	Nico Emonds (BEL)	Teka	+ 1' 21"
8	Reimund Dietzen (FRG)	Teka	+ 1' 42"
9	Michel Pollentier (BEL)	Safir–Van de Ven	+ 2' 28"
10	Faustino Rupérez (ESP)	Zor–Gemeaz Cusin	+ 2' 47"

== Stage 12 ==
29 April 1984 — Santander to Lagos de Covadonga, 199 km (124 mi)

Stage 12 result

Rank	Rider	Team	Time
1	Reimund Dietzen (FRG)	Teka	5h 48' 11"
2	Éric Caritoux (FRA)	Skil–Reydel–Sem–Mavic	s.t.
3	Alberto Fernández (ESP)	Zor–Gemeaz Cusin	+ 2"
4	Julián Gorospe (ESP)	Reynolds	+ 8"
5	José Patrocinio Jiménez (COL)	Teka	+ 32"
6	Eduardo Chozas (ESP)	Zor–Gemeaz Cusin	+ 36"
7	Jean-Claude Bagot (ITA)	Skil–Reydel–Sem–Mavic	+ 55"
8	Marino Lejarreta (ESP)	Alfa Lum–Olmo	s.t.
9	José Luis Laguía (ESP)	Reynolds	s.t.
10	Juan Pujol Pagés (ESP)	Hueso	+ 59"

General classification after Stage 12

Rank	Rider	Team	Time
1	Éric Caritoux (FRA)	Skil–Reydel–Sem–Mavic	63h 38' 16"
2	Alberto Fernández (ESP)	Zor–Gemeaz Cusin	+ 32"
3	José Patrocinio Jiménez (COL)	Teka	+ 59"
4	Edgar Corredor (COL)	Teka	+ 1' 10"
5	Pedro Delgado (ESP)	Reynolds	+ 1' 18"
6	Eduardo Chozas (ESP)	Zor–Gemeaz Cusin	+ 1' 26"
7	Reimund Dietzen (FRG)	Teka	+ 1' 31"
8	Nico Emonds (BEL)	Teka	+ 3' 37"
9	Michel Pollentier (BEL)	Safir–Van de Ven	+ 4' 25"
10	Jesús Rodríguez Magro (ESP)	Zor–Gemeaz Cusin	+ 5' 48"

== Stage 13 ==
30 April 1984 — Cangas de Onís to Oviedo, 170 km (110 mi)

Stage 13 result

Rank	Rider	Team	Time
1	Guido Van Calster (BEL)	Del Tongo–Colnago	4h 31' 45"
2	José Luis Navarro (ESP)	Zor–Gemeaz Cusin	s.t.
3	Julián Gorospe (ESP)	Reynolds	s.t.
4	Vicente Belda (ESP)	Kelme	s.t.
5	Ángel Arroyo (ESP)	Reynolds	+ 5"
6	Jozef Lieckens (BEL)	Safir–Van de Ven	+ 7"
7	Jesús Suárez Cueva (ESP)	Hueso	s.t.
8	Eddy Vanhaerens (BEL)	Safir–Van de Ven	s.t.
9	Noël Dejonckheere (BEL)	Teka	s.t.
10	Benny Van Brabant (BEL)	Tönissteiner–Lotto–Mavic	s.t.

General classification after Stage 13

Rank	Rider	Team	Time
1	Éric Caritoux (FRA)	Skil–Reydel–Sem–Mavic	68h 10' 08"
2	Alberto Fernández (ESP)	Zor–Gemeaz Cusin	+ 32"
3	José Patrocinio Jiménez (COL)	Teka	+ 59"
4	Edgar Corredor (COL)	Teka	+ 1' 10"
5	Pedro Delgado (ESP)	Reynolds	+ 1' 18"
6	Eduardo Chozas (ESP)	Zor–Gemeaz Cusin	+ 1' 26"
7	Reimund Dietzen (FRG)	Teka	+ 1' 31"
8	Nico Emonds (BEL)	Teka	+ 3' 37"
9	Michel Pollentier (BEL)	Safir–Van de Ven	+ 4' 25"
10	Vicente Belda (ESP)	Kelme	+ 5' 45"

== Stage 14 ==
1 May 1984 — Lugones to Monte Naranco, 12 km (7.5 mi) (ITT)

Stage 14 result

Rank	Rider	Team	Time
1	Julián Gorospe (ESP)	Reynolds	22' 18"
2	Éric Caritoux (FRA)	Skil–Reydel–Sem–Mavic	+ 40"
3	Alberto Fernández (ESP)	Zor–Gemeaz Cusin	+ 45"
4	Pedro Delgado (ESP)	Reynolds	+ 56"
5	Vicente Belda (ESP)	Kelme	+ 57"
6	Antonio Coll (ESP)	Teka	+ 1' 07"
7	Reimund Dietzen (FRG)	Teka	+ 1' 16"
8	Guillermo De La Peña (ESP)	Hueso	+ 1' 17"
9	Pello Ruiz Cabestany (ESP)	Orbea–Danena	+ 1' 20"
10	José Recio (ESP)	Kelme	s.t.

General classification after Stage 14

Rank	Rider	Team	Time
1	Éric Caritoux (FRA)	Skil–Reydel–Sem–Mavic	68h 33' 06"
2	Alberto Fernández (ESP)	Zor–Gemeaz Cusin	+ 37"
3	Pedro Delgado (ESP)	Reynolds	+ 1' 34"
4	Reimund Dietzen (FRG)	Teka	+ 2' 07"
5	Eduardo Chozas (ESP)	Zor–Gemeaz Cusin	+ 2' 20"
6	José Patrocinio Jiménez (COL)	Teka	+ 2' 53"
7	Edgar Corredor (COL)	Teka	+ 2' 56"
8	Nico Emonds (BEL)	Teka	+ 4' 48"
9	Michel Pollentier (BEL)	Safir–Van de Ven	+ 5' 30"
10	Vicente Belda (ESP)	Kelme	+ 6' 02"

== Stage 15 ==
2 May 1984 — Oviedo to León, 121 km (75 mi)

Stage 15 result

Rank	Rider	Team	Time
1	Antonio Coll (ESP)	Teka	2h 59' 52"
2	Marino Lejarreta (ESP)	Alfa Lum–Olmo	s.t.
3	Julián Gorospe (ESP)	Reynolds	s.t.
4	Ángel Arroyo (ESP)	Reynolds	+ 5"
5	Nico Emonds (BEL)	Teka	+ 1' 30"
6	Guido Van Calster (BEL)	Del Tongo–Colnago	+ 1' 42"
7	Benny Van Brabant (BEL)	Tönissteiner–Lotto–Mavic	s.t.
8	Miguel Ángel Iglesias (ESP)	Kelme	s.t.
9	José Luis Laguía (ESP)	Reynolds	s.t.
10	Sabino Angoitia (ESP)	Hueso	s.t.

General classification after Stage 15

Rank	Rider	Team	Time
1	Éric Caritoux (FRA)	Skil–Reydel–Sem–Mavic	71h 34' 40"
2	Alberto Fernández (ESP)	Zor–Gemeaz Cusin	+ 37"
3	Pedro Delgado (ESP)	Reynolds	+ 1' 34"
4	Reimund Dietzen (FRG)	Teka	+ 2' 07"
5	Eduardo Chozas (ESP)	Zor–Gemeaz Cusin	+ 2' 20"
6	José Patrocinio Jiménez (COL)	Teka	+ 2' 53"
7	Edgar Corredor (COL)	Teka	+ 2' 56"
8	Julián Gorospe (ESP)	Reynolds	+ 4' 26"
9	Nico Emonds (BEL)	Teka	+ 4' 36"
10	Michel Pollentier (BEL)	Safir–Van de Ven	+ 5' 30"

== Stage 16 ==
3 May 1984 — León to Valladolid, 138 km (86 mi)

Stage 16 result

Rank	Rider	Team	Time
1	Daniel Rossel (BEL)	Tönissteiner–Lotto–Mavic	2h 57' 05"
2	Jaime Vilamajó (ESP)	Reynolds	+ 4' 13"
3	Miguel Ángel Iglesias (ESP)	Kelme	s.t.
4	Walter Dalgal (ITA)	Gis Gelati–Tuc Lu	+ 4' 19"
5	Guido Van Calster (BEL)	Del Tongo–Colnago	s.t.
6	Diederik Foubert (BEL)	Safir–Van de Ven	s.t.
7	Noël Dejonckheere (BEL)	Teka	s.t.
8	Luc De Decker (BEL)	Safir–Van de Ven	s.t.
9	Patrizio Gambirasio (ITA)	Gis Gelati–Tuc Lu	s.t.
10	Mariano Bayon Magdaleno (ESP)	Dormilón	s.t.

General classification after Stage 16

Rank	Rider	Team	Time
1	Éric Caritoux (FRA)	Skil–Reydel–Sem–Mavic	74h 36' 04"
2	Alberto Fernández (ESP)	Zor–Gemeaz Cusin	+ 37"
3	Pedro Delgado (ESP)	Reynolds	+ 1' 34"
4	Reimund Dietzen (FRG)	Teka	+ 2' 07"
5	Eduardo Chozas (ESP)	Zor–Gemeaz Cusin	+ 2' 20"
6	José Patrocinio Jiménez (COL)	Teka	+ 2' 53"
7	Edgar Corredor (COL)	Teka	+ 2' 56"
8	Julián Gorospe (ESP)	Reynolds	+ 4' 26"
9	Nico Emonds (BEL)	Teka	+ 4' 36"
10	Michel Pollentier (BEL)	Safir–Van de Ven	+ 5' 30"

== Stage 17 ==
4 May 1984 — Valladolid to Segovia, 258 km (160 mi)

Stage 17 result

Rank	Rider	Team	Time
1	José Recio (ESP)	Kelme	7h 29' 19"
2	Reimund Dietzen (FRG)	Teka	+ 38"
3	Francesco Moser (ITA)	Gis Gelati–Tuc Lu	s.t.
4	Éric Caritoux (FRA)	Skil–Reydel–Sem–Mavic	s.t.
5	Alberto Fernández (ESP)	Zor–Gemeaz Cusin	s.t.
6	Pedro Delgado (ESP)	Reynolds	s.t.
7	Jesús Rodríguez Magro (ESP)	Zor–Gemeaz Cusin	s.t.
8	José Luis Navarro (ESP)	Zor–Gemeaz Cusin	s.t.
9	Palmiro Masciarelli (ITA)	Gis Gelati–Tuc Lu	s.t.
10	Ángel de las Heras (ESP)	Hueso	s.t.

General classification after Stage 17

Rank	Rider	Team	Time
1	Éric Caritoux (FRA)	Skil–Reydel–Sem–Mavic	82h 06' 10"
2	Alberto Fernández (ESP)	Zor–Gemeaz Cusin	+ 37"
3	Pedro Delgado (ESP)	Reynolds	+ 1' 34"
4	Reimund Dietzen (FRG)	Teka	+ 2' 07"
5	Edgar Corredor (COL)	Teka	+ 2' 56"
6	José Patrocinio Jiménez (COL)	Teka	+ 4' 33"
7	Nico Emonds (BEL)	Teka	+ 4' 36"
8	Vicente Belda (ESP)	Kelme	+ 6' 02"
9	Julián Gorospe (ESP)	Reynolds	+ 6' 06"
10	Jesús Rodríguez Magro (ESP)	Zor–Gemeaz Cusin	+ 7' 25"

== Stage 18a ==
5 May 1984 — Segovia to Torrejón de Ardoz, 145 km (90 mi)

Stage 18a result

Rank	Rider	Team	Time
1	Jesús Suárez Cueva (ESP)	Hueso	3h 41' 11"
2	Jozef Lieckens (BEL)	Safir–Van de Ven	+ 16' 56"
3	Guido Van Calster (BEL)	Del Tongo–Colnago	s.t.
4	Sabino Angoitia (ESP)	Hueso	s.t.
5	Ronny Van Holen (BEL)	Safir–Van de Ven	s.t.
6	Salvatore Maccali (ITA)	Alfa Lum–Olmo	s.t.
7	Vicente Belda (ESP)	Kelme	s.t.
8	Pello Ruiz Cabestany (ESP)	Orbea–Danena	s.t.
9	Éric Guyot (FRA)	Skil–Reydel–Sem–Mavic	s.t.
10	Enrique Aja (ESP)	Reynolds	s.t.

General classification after Stage 18a

Rank	Rider	Team	Time
1	Éric Caritoux (FRA)	Skil–Reydel–Sem–Mavic	82h 06' 10"
2	Alberto Fernández (ESP)	Zor–Gemeaz Cusin	+ 37"
3	Pedro Delgado (ESP)	Reynolds	+ 1' 34"

== Stage 18b ==
5 May 1984 — Torrejón de Ardoz to Torrejón de Ardoz, 33 km (21 mi) (ITT)

Stage 18b result

Rank	Rider	Team	Time
1	Julián Gorospe (ESP)	Reynolds	43' 39"
2	Nico Emonds (BEL)	Teka	+ 32"
3	Jesús Blanco Villar (ESP)	Teka	+ 46"
4	Reimund Dietzen (FRG)	Teka	+ 51"
5	Alberto Fernández (ESP)	Zor–Gemeaz Cusin	+ 54"
6	José Recio (ESP)	Kelme	+ 58"
7	Antonio Coll (ESP)	Teka	+ 1' 13"
8	Michel Pollentier (BEL)	Safir–Van de Ven	+ 1' 24"
9	Éric Caritoux (FRA)	Skil–Reydel–Sem–Mavic	+ 1' 25"
10	Pello Ruiz Cabestany (ESP)	Orbea–Danena	+ 1' 26"

General classification after Stage 18b

Rank	Rider	Team	Time
1	Éric Caritoux (FRA)	Skil–Reydel–Sem–Mavic	86h 49' 12"
2	Alberto Fernández (ESP)	Zor–Gemeaz Cusin	+ 6"
3	Reimund Dietzen (FRG)	Teka	+ 1' 33"
4	Pedro Delgado (ESP)	Reynolds	+ 1' 43"
5	Edgar Corredor (COL)	Teka	+ 3' 40"
6	Julián Gorospe (ESP)	Reynolds	+ 4' 41"
7	Nico Emonds (BEL)	Teka	+ 5' 35"
8	José Patrocinio Jiménez (COL)	Teka	+ 7' 10"
9	Vicente Belda (ESP)	Kelme	+ 7' 14"
10	José Recio (ESP)	Kelme	+ 7' 21"

== Stage 19 ==
6 May 1984 — Torrejón de Ardoz to Madrid, 139 km (86 mi)

Stage 19 result

Rank	Rider	Team	Time
1	Noël Dejonckheere (BEL)	Teka	3h 18' 51"
2	Guido Van Calster (BEL)	Del Tongo–Colnago	s.t.
3	Giuseppe Martinelli (ITA)	Alfa Lum–Olmo	s.t.
4	Jesús Suárez Cueva (ESP)	Hueso	s.t.
5	Jozef Lieckens (BEL)	Safir–Van de Ven	s.t.
6	Patrizio Gambirasio (ITA)	Gis Gelati–Tuc Lu	s.t.
7	Marc Goossens (BEL)	Tönissteiner–Lotto–Mavic	s.t.
8	Eddy Vanhaerens (BEL)	Safir–Van de Ven	s.t.
9	Benny Van Brabant (BEL)	Tönissteiner–Lotto–Mavic	s.t.
10	Miguel Ángel Iglesias (ESP)	Kelme	s.t.

General classification after Stage 19

Rank	Rider	Team	Time
1	Éric Caritoux (FRA)	Skil–Reydel–Sem–Mavic	90h 08' 03"
2	Alberto Fernández (ESP)	Zor–Gemeaz Cusin	+ 6"
3	Reimund Dietzen (FRG)	Teka	+ 1' 33"
4	Pedro Delgado (ESP)	Reynolds	+ 1' 43"
5	Edgar Corredor (COL)	Teka	+ 3' 40"
6	Julián Gorospe (ESP)	Reynolds	+ 4' 41"
7	José Patrocinio Jiménez (COL)	Teka	+ 7' 10"
8	Vicente Belda (ESP)	Kelme	+ 7' 14"
9	José Recio (ESP)	Kelme	+ 7' 21"
10	Francesco Moser (ITA)	Gis Gelati–Tuc Lu	+ 8' 41"
