= Grand Prix Jean Bausch-Pierre Kellner =

The Grand Prix Jean Bausch-Pierre Kellner is a cyclo-cross race held in Muhlenbach, Luxembourg.

== Past winners ==
| Year | winner |
|---|---|
| 2007 | (Luxembourg) Jean-Pierre Drucker |
| 2006 | (Germany) Johannes Sickmüller |
| 2005 | (Belgium) David Willemsens |
| 2004 | (Belgium) Arne Daelmans |
| 2003 | (Belgium) Arne Daelmans |
| 2002 | (Belgium) Peter Van Santvliet |
| 2001 | (Belgium) Bjorn Rondelez |
| 2000 | (Belgium) Bjorn Rondelez |
| 1999 | (Belgium) Ben Berden |
| 1998 | (Belgium) Arne Daelmans |
| 1997 | (Belgium) Arne Daelmans |
| 1996 | (Belgium) Erwin Bollen |
| 1995 | (Denmark) Jan Erik Østergaard |
| 1994 | (Germany) Jörg Arenz |
| 1993 | (Germany) Jens Schwedler |
| 1992 | (Czechoslovakia) Petr Hric |
| 1991 | (Czechoslovakia) Petr Hric |
| 1990 | (Belgium) Paul Hereijgers |
| 1989 | (Belgium) Paul Hereijgers |
| 1988 | (United Kingdom) Steve Douce |
| 1987 | (Belgium) Paul Hereijgers |
| 1986 | (United Kingdom) Steve Douce |
| 1985 | (West Germany) Raimund Dietzen |
| 1984 | (West Germany) Jozef Meisen |
| 1983 | (Luxembourg) Claude Michely |
| 1982 | (West Germany) Raimund Dietzen |
| 1979 | (Luxembourg) Claude Michely |
| 1978 | (France) Alex Gerardin |
