= Ben Berden =

Belgian cyclist

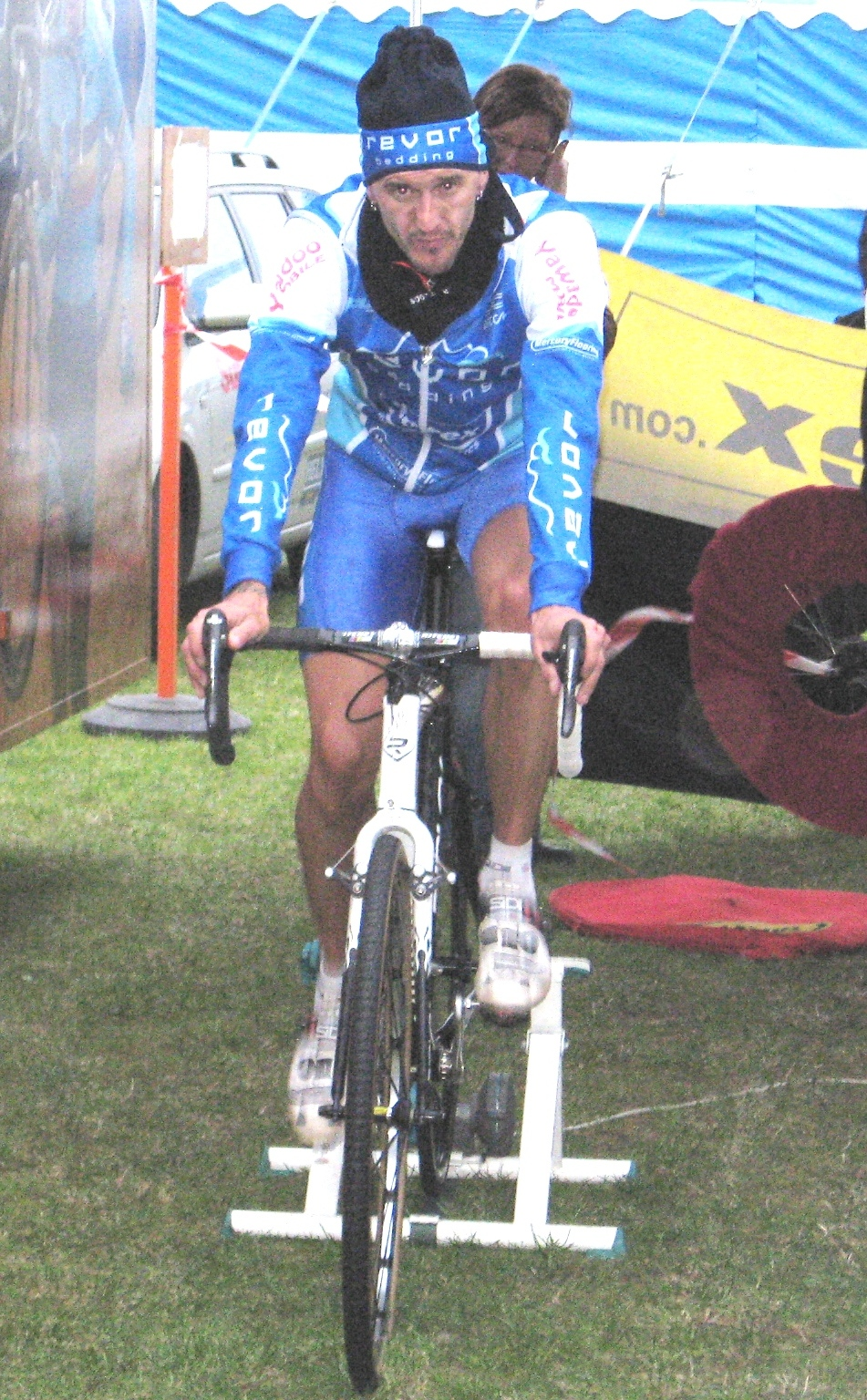

Personal information
- Born: 29 September 1975 (age 51) Hasselt, Belgium

Cycling career
- Sport: Cycling
- Current team: Raleigh Clement
- Discipline: Cyclo-Cross
- Role: Rider

Professional teams
- 1999: Palmans-Ideal
- 2000–2003: Vlaanderen 2002
- 2012–: Raleigh-Clement

Ben Berden (born 29 September 1975) is a Belgian professional racing cyclist specializing in cyclocross. Berden was caught for doping in January 2005, immediately admitted to it, and was ultimately banned from the sport for 15 months.

== Career highlights ==
1993–1994
(bronze) , World U19 Cyclo-Cross Championship, Koksijde
1995–1996
Belgium U23 Cyclo-Cross Champion, Overijse
3rd, Leudelange, Cyclo-cross
1996–1997
2nd, National U23 Cyclo-Cross Championship, Hoogstraten
2nd, Paal-Beringen, Cyclo-cross
1997–1998
2nd, Koningshooikt, Cyclo-cross
3rd, Fond-de-Gras, Cyclo-cross
3rd, Paal-Beringen, Cyclo-cross
1998–1999
1st, Overall, Ronde van Vlaams-Brabant

Winner Stage 1, Heverlee

1st, Bredene, Cyclo-cross
1st, Eernegem, Cyclo-cross
1st, Muhlenbach, Cyclo-cross
2nd, Duffel, Cyclo-cross
3rd, Ruiselede/Doomkerke, Cyclo-cross
3rd, Koppenberg, Cyclo-cross
3rd, Eeklo, Cyclo-cross
1999–2000
2nd, Ostend, Cyclo-cross
3rd, Koningshooikt, Cyclo-cross
3rd, Eeklo, Cyclo-cross
2000–2001
1st, Zelzate, Cyclo-cross
2001–2002
1st, Eernegem, Cyclo-cross
1st, Zürich-Waid, Cyclo-cross
2nd, Rijkevorsel, Cyclo-cross
2nd, Zonnebeke, Cyclo-cross
2nd, Wielsbeke, Cyclo-cross
2nd, Muhlenbach, Cyclo-cross
3rd, Ostend, Cyclo-cross
3rd, Wortegem-Petegem, Cyclo-cross
3rd, Baal, Cyclo-cross
3rd, Otegem, Cyclo-cross
2002–2003
1st, Châteaubernard, Cyclo-cross
1st, Koksijde, Cyclo-cross
1st, Lieshout, Cyclo-cross
1st, Heerlen, Cyclo-cross
1st, Oostmalle, Cyclo-cross
1st, Wortegem-Petegem, Cyclo-cross
1st, Magstadt, Cyclo-cross
2nd, Sint-Niklaas, Cyclo-cross
2nd, National Cyclo-Cross Championship, Wielsbeke
2nd, Pijnacker-Nootdorp, Cyclo-cross
3rd, Lanarvily, Cyclo-cross
3rd, Kalmthout, Cyclo-cross
3rd, Wortegem-Petegem, Cyclo-cross
3rd, Baal, Cyclo-cross
3rd, Wetzikon, Cyclo-cross
3rd, Eeklo, Cyclo-cross
3rd, Hoogerheide, Cyclo-cross
2003–2004
1st, Eernegem Cyclo-cross
1st, Huijbergen, Cyclo-cross
1st, Koksijde, Cyclo-cross
1st, Magstadt, Cyclo-cross
2nd, Zolder, Cyclo-cross
2nd, Erpe-Mere, Cyclo-cross
2nd, Woerden, Cyclo-cross
2nd, Hamme-Zogge, Cyclo-cross
2nd, Baal, Cyclo-cross
3rd, Middelkerke, Cyclo-cross
3rd, Dottignies, Cyclo-cross
3rd, Harderwijk, Cyclo-cross
3rd, Turin, Cyclo-cross
3rd, Niel, Cyclo-cross
3rd, Sankt-Wendel, Cyclo-cross
3rd, Hooglede, Cyclo-cross
3rd, Zeddam, Cyclo-cross
3rd, Loenhout, Cyclo-cross
2004–2005
1st, Genk, Cyclo-cross
1st, Harderwijk, Cyclo-cross
1st, Hooglede, Cyclo-cross
1st, Lebbeke, Cyclo-cross
2nd, Zolder, Cyclo-cross
2nd, Aalter, Cyclo-cross
2nd, Erpe-Mere, Cyclo-cross
2nd, Ardooie, Cyclo-cross
2nd, Vossem, Cyclo-cross
2nd, Gavere-Asper, Cyclo-cross
2nd, Milan, Cyclo-cross
2nd, Essen, Cyclo-cross
3rd, Ruddervoorde, Cyclo-cross
3rd, Koksijde, Cyclo-cross
3rd, Kalmthout, Cyclo-cross
3rd, National Cyclo-Cross Championship Wachtebeke
2006–2007
3rd, Muhlenbach, Cyclo-cross
2007–2008
2nd, Torhout-Wijnendale, Cyclo-cross
2nd, Lanarvily, Cyclo-cross
3rd, National Amateur Cyclo-Cross Championship, Hofstade
