= Espitia =

Espitia is a surname. Notable people with the surname include:

- Manny Espitia (fl. 2007), American politician
- Manuel Cárdenas Espitia (1961–1990), Colombian racing cyclist
