= 1985 Critérium du Dauphiné Libéré =

Race details
- Dates: 27 May – 3 June 1985
- Stages: 9 + Prologue
- Distance: 1,218.3 km (757.0 mi)
- Winning time: 31h 44' 07"

Results
| Jersey awarded to the overall winner | Winner | Phil Anderson (AUS) | (Panasonic–Raleigh) |
| | Second | Steven Rooks (NED) | (Panasonic–Raleigh) |
| | Third | Pierre Bazzo (FRA) | (Fagor) |
| Jersey awarded to the points classification winner | Points | Phil Anderson (AUS) | (Panasonic–Raleigh) |

The 1985 Critérium du Dauphiné Libéré was the 38th edition of the cycle race and was held from 27 May to 3 June 1985. The race started in Annemasse and finished in Avignon. The race was won by Phil Anderson of the Panasonic–Raleigh team.

== Teams ==
Eleven teams, containing a total of 92 riders, participated in the race:

- Varta–Café de Colombia–Mavic
- La Vie Claire
- Peugeot–Shell–Michelin
- La Redoute
- Panasonic–Raleigh
- Skil–Sem–Kas–Miko
- Tönissteiner–TW Rock–BASF
- Teka
- Renault–Elf
- Fagor
- Rank Xerox–Philadelphia

== Route ==
Stage characteristics and winners
| Stage | Date | Course | Distance | Type | Winner |
|---|---|---|---|---|---|
| P | 27 May | Annemasse | 4.25 km (2.64 mi) | Individual time trial | Stephen Roche (IRL) |
| 1 | 28 May | Annemasse to Aix-les-Bains | 86 km (53 mi) | | Noël Segers (BEL) |
| 2 | 28 May | Aix-les-Bains to Ambérieu | 91 km (57 mi) | | Phil Anderson (AUS) |
| 3 | 29 May | Ambérieu to Firminy | 170 km (110 mi) | | Carlos Jaramillo (COL) |
| 4 | 30 May | Firminy to Charolles | 182 km (113 mi) | | Benny Van Brabant (BEL) |
| 5 | 31 May | Cluny to Rillieux | 164 km (102 mi) | | Jean-René Bernaudeau (FRA) |
| 6 | 1 June | Villefontaine to Grenoble | 207 km (129 mi) | | Pierre Bazzo (FRA) |
| 7 | 2 June | Grenoble to Gap | 173 km (107 mi) | | Steven Rooks (NED) |
| 8 | 3 June | Serres to Orange | 107 km (66 mi) | | Benny Van Brabant (BEL) |
| 9 | 3 June | Orange to Avignon | 34.1 km (21.2 mi) | Individual time trial | Stephen Roche (IRL) |

== General classification ==
Final general classification

| Rank | Rider | Team | Time |
|---|---|---|---|
| 1 | Phil Anderson (AUS) | Panasonic–Raleigh | 31h 44' 07" |
| 2 | Steven Rooks (NED) | Panasonic–Raleigh | + 24" |
| 3 | Pierre Bazzo (FRA) | Fagor | + 27" |
| 4 | Kim Andersen (DEN) | La Vie Claire | + 4' 33" |
| 5 | Pablo Wilches (COL) | Varta–Café de Colombia–Mavic | + 6' 33" |
| 6 | Éric Caritoux (FRA) | Skil–Sem–Kas–Miko | + 7' 37" |
| 7 | Herman Loaiza (COL) | Varta–Café de Colombia–Mavic | + 7' 43" |
| 8 | Peter Winnen (NED) | Panasonic–Raleigh | + 8' 34" |
| 9 | Robert Millar (GBR) | Peugeot–Shell–Michelin | + 9' 17" |
| 10 | Dominique Garde (FRA) | Skil–Sem–Kas–Miko | + 15' 46" |
