= 1993 Volta a la Comunitat Valenciana =

Race details
- Dates: 23–28 February 1993
- Stages: 5
- Winning time: 23h 03' 51"

Results
	Winner	Julián Gorospe (ESP)	(Banesto)
	Second	Stefano Della Santa (ITA)	(Mapei–Viner)
	Third	Miguel Induráin (ESP)	(Banesto)

The 1993 Volta a la Comunitat Valenciana was the 51st edition of the Volta a la Comunitat Valenciana road cycling stage race, which was held from 23 February to 28 February 1993. The race started in Torrevieja and finished in Valencia. The race was won by Julián Gorospe of the Banesto team.

== General classification ==
Final general classification

Rank	Rider	Team	Time
1	Julián Gorospe (ESP)	Banesto	23h 03' 51"
2	Stefano Della Santa (ITA)	Mapei–Viner	+ 6"
3	Miguel Induráin (ESP)	Banesto	+ 21"
4	Vicente Aparicio (ESP)	Amaya Seguros	+ 25"
5	Erik Breukink (NED)	ONCE	+ 28"
6	Tony Rominger (SUI)	CLAS–Cajastur	+ 31"
7	Steven Rooks (NED)	Festina–Lotus	+ 41"
8	Jesús Montoya (ESP)	Amaya Seguros	+ 49"
9	Stéphane Heulot (FRA)	Banesto	+ 1' 01"
10	Fernando Escartín (ESP)	CLAS–Cajastur	+ 1' 07"
