= 1987 Volta a Catalunya =

Race details
- Dates: 9–17 September 1987
- Stages: 8 + Prologue
- Distance: 1,367 km (849.4 mi)
- Winning time: 34h 32' 36"

Results
	Winner	Álvaro Pino (ESP)	(BH)
	Second	Ángel Arroyo (ESP)	(Reynolds)
	Third	Iñaki Gastón (ESP)	(Kas)
	Points	Sean Kelly (IRL)	(Kas)
	Mountains	Pedro Muñoz Machín Rodríguez (ESP)	(Fagor–MBK)
	Sprints	Sabino Angoitia (ESP)	(Zahor Chocolates)
	Team	Reynolds	

The 1987 Volta a Catalunya was the 67th edition of the Volta a Catalunya cycle race and was held from 9 September to 17 September 1987 with a total of 8 stages. The race started in Sant Sadurní d'Anoia and finished in Platja d'Aro. The race was won by Galician Álvaro Pino from the BH team. Ángel Arroyo from Reynolds-Seur team and Iñaki Gastón from Kas team were second and third in the race.

The eighth stage, divided in two sectors, had two individual Time Trials, one in San Sadurní de Noya and the other in Bañolas.

Álvaro Pino won his only lap when he was going through a tendinitis.

== General classification ==
Final general classification

Rank	Rider	Team	Time
1	Álvaro Pino (ESP)	BH	34h 32' 36"
2	Ángel Arroyo (ESP)	Reynolds	+ 2' 43"
3	Iñaki Gastón (ESP)	Kas	+ 3' 26"
4	Edgar Corredor (COL)	Café de Colombia–Varta	+ 3' 43"
5	Sean Kelly (IRL)	Kas	+ 3' 44"
6	Laurent Fignon (FRA)	Système U	+ 3' 58"
7	Pedro Delgado (ESP)	PDM–Ultima–Concorde	+ 4' 13"
8	José Recio (ESP)	Kelme	+ 4' 39"
9	Marino Lejarreta (ESP)	Caja Rural–Orbea	+ 4' 58"
10	Pedro Muñoz (ESP)	Fagor–MBK	+ 5' 02"
