= Alberto Fernández Sainz =

Spanish cyclist (born 1981)

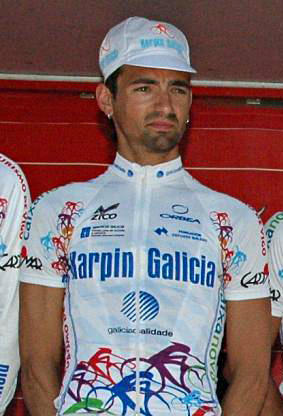

Personal information
- Born: 15 November 1981 (age 44) Barros, Cantabria, Spain

Cycling career
- Sport: Cycling
- Current team: Retired
- Disciplines: Road; Mountain bike
- Role: Rider

Amateur teams
- 2003: Cropusa–Burgos
- 2004: Café Baqué amateur
- 2005: Camargo-Roper
- 2007: Supermercados Froiz
- 2017: Gomur–Liébana 2017

Professional teams
- 2008–2010: Karpin–Galicia
- 2016: Qinghai Tianyoude Cycling Team

Alberto Fernández Sainz (born 15 November 1981 in Barros, Cantabria) is a Spanish former professional cyclist. His father Alberto Fernández Blanco was a professional cyclist from 1978 to 1984.

== Major results ==
2005
2nd Overall Tour of Galicia
2006
2nd Overall Vuelta a Tarragona
2007
1st Bizkaiko Bira
10th Overall Circuito Montañes
2018
2nd Ultra cross-country marathon, European Mountain Bike Championships
