= 1982 Volta a Catalunya =

Race details
- Dates: 8–15 September 1982
- Stages: 8 + Prologue
- Distance: 1,258.8 km (782.2 mi)
- Winning time: 33h 13' 53"

Results
	Winner	Alberto Fernández (ESP)	(Teka)
	Second	Pedro Muñoz (ESP)	(Zor–Helios–Gemeaz Cusin)
	Third	Julián Gorospe (ESP)	(Reynolds)
	Points	Johan van der Velde (NED)	(TI–Raleigh–Campagnolo)
	Mountains	Pedro Muñoz Machín Rodríguez (ESP)	(Zor–Gemeaz Cusin)
	Sprints	Patrick Cocquyt (BEL)	(Safir–Marc)
	Team	TI–Raleigh–Campagnolo	

The 1982 Volta a Catalunya was the 62nd edition of the Volta a Catalunya cycle race and was held from 8 September to 15 September 1982. The race started in Platja d'Aro and finished at Salou. The race was won by Alberto Fernández of the Teka team.

== General classification ==
Final general classification

Rank	Rider	Team	Time
1	Alberto Fernández (ESP)	Teka	33h 13' 53"
2	Pedro Muñoz (ESP)	Zor–Helios–Gemeaz Cusin	+ 51"
3	Julián Gorospe (ESP)	Reynolds	+ 2' 12"
4	Hubert Seiz (SUI)	Cilo–Aufina	+ 3' 10"
5	Vicente Belda (ESP)	Kelme–Merckx	+ 4' 35"
6	Faustino Rupérez (ESP)	Zor–Helios–Gemeaz Cusin	+ 9' 06"
7	Emanuele Bombini (ITA)	Hoonved–Bottecchia	+ 9' 08"
8	Serge Demierre (SUI)	Cilo–Aufina	+ 9' 13"
9	Johan van der Velde (NED)	TI–Raleigh–Campagnolo	+ 9' 57"
10	Steven Rooks (NED)	TI–Raleigh–Campagnolo	+ 9' 57"
