= Alain Dithurbide =

French cyclist

Personal information
- Born: 18 January 1959 (age 67) Louey, France

Cycling career
- Sport: Cycling
- Role: Rider

Alain Dithurbide (born 18 January 1959) is a French former professional racing cyclist. He rode in the 1984 Tour de France.
