= 1984 Tour of the Basque Country =

Race details
- Dates: 2–6 April 1984
- Stages: 5
- Distance: 867.1 km (538.8 mi)
- Winning time: 22h 29' 28"

Results
	Winner	Sean Kelly (IRL)	(Skil–Reydel–Sem–Mavic)
	Second	Faustino Rupérez (ESP)	(Zor–Gemeaz Cusin)
	Third	Marino Lejarreta (ESP)	(Alfa Lum–Olmo)

The 1984 Tour of the Basque Country was the 24th edition of the Tour of the Basque Country cycle race and was held from 2 April to 6 April 1984. The race started in Mungia and finished at Zarautz. The race was won by Sean Kelly of the Skil team.

== General classification ==
Final general classification

Rank	Rider	Team	Time
1	Sean Kelly (IRL)	Skil–Reydel–Sem–Mavic	22h 29' 28"
2	Faustino Rupérez (ESP)	Zor–Gemeaz Cusin	+ 2' 30"
3	Marino Lejarreta (ESP)	Alfa Lum–Olmo	+ 5' 02"
4	Claude Criquielion (BEL)	Splendor–Jacky Aernoudt Meubelen	+ 5' 28"
5	Alberto Fernández (ESP)	Zor–Gemeaz Cusin	+ 5' 32"
6	Éric Caritoux (FRA)	Skil–Reydel–Sem–Mavic	+ 5' 32"
7	Jean-Marie Grezet (SUI)	Skil–Reydel–Sem–Mavic	+ 5' 59"
8	Pello Ruiz Cabestany (ESP)	Orbea–Danena	+ 6' 00"
9	Pedro Delgado (ESP)	Reynolds	+ 6' 17"
10	Ángel de las Heras (ESP)	Hueso	+ 6' 18"
