= Herman Loaiza =

Colombian cyclist

Personal information
- Full name: Herman Loaiza Martínez
- Born: 14 April 1956 (age 70) Manizales, Colombia

Cycling career
- Sport: Cycling
- Discipline: Road
- Role: Rider

Amateur teams
- 1975: Almacenes Everfit
- 1977: Banco Cafetero
- 1979: Pilas Varta
- 1980: Lotería de Boyacá
- 1982: Coldeportes Caldas
- 1983: Varta Caldas
- 1983–1984: Pilas Varta–Colombia

Professional teams
- 1985: Varta–Renault
- 1985–1987: Varta–Café de Colombia–Mavic

Herman Loaiza (born 14 April 1956) is a Colombian former professional racing cyclist. He rode in two editions of the Tour de France.

== Major results ==
1975
1st Young rider classification, Clásico RCN
1976
1st Mountains classification, Vuelta a Antioquia
5th Overall Vuelta a Guatemala

1st Stages 4 & 9

1977
1st Stage 4 Vuelta a Cundinamarca
1979
1st Overall Vuelta a Costa Rica

1st Stages 1 & 5
1st Sprints classification

1983
1st Overall Tour de Martinique
1985
7th Overall Critérium du Dauphiné Libéré
