= Orlando Maini =

Italian cyclist

Personal information
- Born: 17 December 1958 (age 67) Bologna, Italy

Cycling career
- Sport: Cycling
- Current team: Beltrami TSA–Tre Colli
- Discipline: Road
- Role: Rider (retired); Team manager; Directeur sportif

Professional teams
- 1979–1980: San Giacomo–Mobilificio
- 1982: Termolan
- 1983–1988: Alfa Lum–Olmo

Managerial teams
- 2005–2006: LPR–Piacenza
- 2007: Tinkoff Credit Systems
- 2010: Ceramica Flaminia
- 2012–2017: Lampre–ISD
- 2019–: Team Beltrami TSA–Hopplà–Petroli Firenze

Orlando Maini (born 17 December 1958 in Bologna) is an Italian former professional cyclist, who rode in 11 Grand Tours. He currently works as a directeur sportif for UCI Continental team Beltrami TSA–Tre Colli.

== Major results ==
1984
1st Stage 9 Vuelta a España
1985
1st Stage 7 Giro d'Italia
