= Michel Charréard =

French cyclist

Personal information
- Born: 10 July 1959 (age 67) Vienne, France

Cycling career
- Sport: Cycling
- Role: Rider

Michel Charréard (born 10 July 1959) is a French former professional racing cyclist. He rode in the 1984 Tour de France.
