= José Xavier (cyclist) =

Portuguese cyclist

Personal information
- Born: 22 June 1961 (age 65)

Cycling career
- Sport: Cycling
- Role: Rider

José Antonio Guimarães Xavier (born 22 June 1961) is a Portuguese racing cyclist. He rode in the 1984 Tour de France.
