= Ángel de las Heras =

Spanish cyclist

Personal information
- Full name: Ángel de las Heras Díaz
- Born: 19 July 1957 (age 69) Toledo, Spain

Cycling career
- Sport: Cycling
- Current team: Retired
- Discipline: Road
- Role: Rider

Professional teams
- 1981: Hueso–Manzaneque
- 1982–1983: Kelme–Merckx
- 1984–1985: Hueso
- 1986–1987: Zahor Chocolates

Ángel de las Heras Díaz (born 19 July 1957 in Toledo) is a Spanish former professional road cyclist. He most notably won the 1983 Vuelta a Burgos.

== Major results ==
1981
7th Trofeo Masferrer
1982
1st Stage 5 Vuelta a Burgos
5th Trofeo Masferrer
1983
1st Overall Vuelta a Burgos
1984
10th Overall Tour of the Basque Country
1985
2nd Subida a Arrate

=== Grand Tour general classification results timeline ===
Grand Tour	1981	1982	1983	1984	1985	1986	1987
Giro d'Italia	—	—	—	—	—	—	45
Tour de France	—	—	—	—	—	—	—
Vuelta a España	16	—	20	24	22	—	43
