= 1984 Vuelta a España =

Race details
- Dates: 17 April – 6 May
- Stages: 19 + Prologue, including 1 split stage
- Distance: 3,593 km (2,233 mi)
- Winning time: 90h 08' 03"

Results
Jersey awarded to the overall winner	Winner	Éric Caritoux (FRA)	(Skil–Sem–Mavic–Reydel)
	Second	Alberto Fernández Blanco (ESP)	(Zor–Gemeaz)
	Third	Raimund Dietzen (GER)	(Teka)
Jersey awarded to the points classification winner	Points	Guido Van Calster (BEL)	(Del Tongo)
Jersey awarded to the mountains classification winner	Mountains	Felipe Yáñez (ESP)	(Orbea)
	Youth	Edgar Corredor (COL)	(Teka)
	Sprints	Jozef Lieckens (BEL)	(Safir)
	Team	Teka	

The 39th Edition Vuelta a España (Tour of Spain), a long-distance bicycle stage race and one of the 3 Grand Tours, was held from 17 April to 6 May 1984. It consisted of 19 stages covering a total of 3,593 km, and was won by Éric Caritoux of the Skil–Sem cycling team. It was one of the most surprising grand tour victories in cycling history as Caritoux, a virtual unknown who was part of a lineup that was thrown together at the last minute, won by the closest margin in history.

Caritoux, a second year professional, had shown his climbing talent earlier that year by winning the stage up the Mont-Ventoux of the 1984 Paris–Nice but he did not enter the 1984 Vuelta a España thinking of the overall classification.

On stage 8 Roger De Vlaeminck, one of the oldest riders professionally, won the first Vuelta stage of his career which gave him a stage win in all three grand tours. Fourteen years earlier he won his first grand tour stage during the 1970 Tour de France and had won 22 Giro stages in between. On the 12th stage to Lagos de Covadonga an area in Asturias which includes one of the most important climbs of the Vuelta, Caritoux finished second behind the German Raimund Dietzen. Caritoux took the leader's jersey from Pedro Delgado. Alberto Fernández was 32 seconds behind Caritoux in the general classification at that stage. Fernández had been third the year previously in the Vuelta a España and in the Giro d'Italia. On the stage 14 mountain time trial, Caritoux lost five seconds. Caritoux lost further time in the final individual time trial but still managed to finish the race with a slender lead of six seconds over Fernández, the smallest margin in the history of the Vuelta a España, and also the smallest ever seen in a Grand Tour. Fernández died later on in 1984.

== Teams ==
Thirteen teams were invited by the race organizers to participate in the 1984 edition of the Vuelta a España, six of which were based outside of Spain. Each team sent a squad of ten riders, meaning that the race started with a peloton of 130 cyclists. From the riders that began the race, 97 made it to the finish in Madrid.

The teams entering the race were:

- Alfa Lum
- Hueso
- Del Tongo
- Dormilón
- Tuc Gis
- Kelme
- Orbea
- Reynolds
- Safir
- Skil
- Teka
- Tönissteiner
- Zor

== Route and stages ==
Covering a total of 3,489 km (2,168 mi), it included three individual time trials, and thirteen stages with categorized climbs that awarded mountains classification points. Two of these thirteen stages had summit finishes: stage 7, to Rassos de Peguera; and stage 12, to Lagos de Enol. Another stage with a mountain-top finish was stage 14, which consisted of a climbing time trial to Monte Narasco. The organizers chose to include no rest days. When compared to the previous year's race, the race was 91 km (57 mi) longer and contained the same amount of time trials, stages, and rest days.

Stage characteristics and winners
Stage	Date	Course	Distance	Type	Winner
P	17 April	Jerez de la Frontera	6.6 km (4 mi)	Individual time trial	Francesco Moser (ITA)
1	18 April	Jerez de la Frontera to Málaga	272 km (169 mi)	Stage with mountain(s)	Noël Dejonckheere (BEL)
2	19 April	Málaga to Almería	202 km (126 mi)	Plain stage	Guido Van Calster (BEL)
3	20 April	Mojácar to Elche	204 km (127 mi)	Plain stage	Jozef Lieckens (BEL)
4	21 April	Elche to Valencia	197 km (122 mi)	Stage with mountain(s)	Noël Dejonckheere (BEL)
5	22 April	Valencia to Salou	245 km (152 mi)	Plain stage	Jozef Lieckens (BEL)
6	23 April	Salou to Sant Quirze del Vallès	113 km (70 mi)	Stage with mountain(s)	Michel Pollentier (BEL)
7	24 April	Sant Quirze del Vallès to Rasos de Peguera	184 km (114 mi)	Stage with mountain(s)	Éric Caritoux (FRA)
8	25 April	Cardona to Zaragoza	269 km (167 mi)	Stage with mountain(s)	Roger De Vlaeminck (BEL)
9	26 April	Zaragoza to Soria	159 km (99 mi)	Stage with mountain(s)	Orlando Maini (ITA)
10	27 April	Soria to Burgos	148 km (92 mi)	Plain stage	Palmiro Masciarelli (ITA)
11	28 April	Burgos to Santander	182 km (113 mi)	Stage with mountain(s)	Francesco Moser (ITA)
12	29 April	Santander to Lagos de Covadonga	199 km (124 mi)	Stage with mountain(s)	Raimund Dietzen (FRG)
13	30 April	Cangas de Onís to Oviedo	170 km (106 mi)	Stage with mountain(s)	Guido Van Calster (BEL)
14	1 May	Lugones to Monte Naranco	12 km (7 mi)	Individual time trial	Julián Gorospe (ESP)
15	2 May	Oviedo to León	121 km (75 mi)	Stage with mountain(s)	Antonio Coll (ESP)
16	3 May	León to Valladolid	138 km (86 mi)	Plain stage	Daniël Rossel (BEL)
17	4 May	Valladolid to Segovia	258 km (160 mi)	Stage with mountain(s)	José Recio (ESP)
18a	5 May	Segovia to Torrejón de Ardoz	145 km (90 mi)	Stage with mountain(s)	Jesus Suárez Cuevas (ESP)
18b	5 May	Torrejón de Ardoz	33 km (21 mi)	Individual time trial	Julián Gorospe (ESP)
19	6 May	Torrejón de Ardoz to Madrid	139 km (86 mi)	Plain stage	Noël Dejonckheere (BEL)
	Total		3,593 km (2,233 mi)		

== Classification leadership ==
Three different jerseys were worn during the 1984 Vuelta a España. The leader of the general classification – calculated by adding the stage finish times of each rider, and allowing time bonuses for the first three finishers on mass-start stages – wore a golden jersey. This classification is the most important of the race, and its winner is considered as the winner of the Vuelta.

For the points classification, which awarded a light blue jersey to its leader, cyclists were given points for finishing a stage in the top 15; additional points could also be won in intermediate sprints. The green jersey was awarded to the mountains classification leader. In this ranking, points were won by reaching the summit of a climb ahead of other cyclists. Each climb was ranked as either first, second or third category, with more points available for higher category climbs. The leader of the mountains classification wore a green jersey.

Although no jersey was awarded, there was also one classification for the teams, in which the stage finish times of the best three cyclists per team were added; the leading team was the one with the lowest total time.

The rows in the following table correspond to the jerseys awarded after that stage was run.

Classification leadership by stage
Stage	Winner	General classification	Points classification	Mountains classification	Team classification
P	Francesco Moser	Francesco Moser	Francesco Moser	not awarded	Reynolds
1	Noël Dejonckheere	Francesco Moser	Noël Dejonckheere	Angel Camarillo	Reynolds
2	Guido Van Calster	Francesco Moser	Guido Van Calster	Angel Camarillo	Reynolds
3	Jozef Lieckens	Francesco Moser	Guido Van Calster	Angel Camarillo	Reynolds
4	Noël Dejonckheere	Francesco Moser	Noël Dejonckheere	Felipe Yáñez	Reynolds
5	Jozef Lieckens	Francesco Moser	Noël Dejonckheere	Felipe Yáñez	Teka
6	Michel Pollentier	Francesco Moser	Noël Dejonckheere	Felipe Yáñez	Teka
7	Éric Caritoux	Pedro Delgado	Noël Dejonckheere	Felipe Yáñez	Teka
8	Roger De Vlaeminck	Pedro Delgado	Noël Dejonckheere	Felipe Yáñez	Teka
9	Orlando Maini	Pedro Delgado	Noël Dejonckheere	Felipe Yáñez	Teka
10	Palmiro Masciarelli	Pedro Delgado	Noël Dejonckheere	Felipe Yáñez	Teka
11	Francesco Moser	Pedro Delgado	Guido Van Calster	Felipe Yáñez	Teka
12	Raimund Dietzen	Éric Caritoux	Guido Van Calster	Felipe Yáñez	Teka
13	Guido Van Calster	Éric Caritoux	Guido Van Calster	Felipe Yáñez	Teka
14	Julián Gorospe	Éric Caritoux	Guido Van Calster	Felipe Yáñez	Teka
15	Antonio Coll	Éric Caritoux	Guido Van Calster	Felipe Yáñez	Teka
16	Daniel Rossel	Éric Caritoux	Guido Van Calster	Felipe Yáñez	Teka
17	José Recio	Éric Caritoux	Guido Van Calster	Felipe Yáñez	Teka
18a	Jesús Suárez Cueva	Éric Caritoux	Guido Van Calster	Felipe Yáñez	Teka
18b	Julián Gorospe	Éric Caritoux	Guido Van Calster	Felipe Yáñez	Teka
19	Noël Dejonckheere	Éric Caritoux	Guido Van Calster	Felipe Yáñez	Teka
Final		Éric Caritoux	Guido Van Calster	Felipe Yáñez	Teka

== Final standings ==
Legend
A gold jersey	Denotes the winner of the General classification	A green jersey	Denotes the winner of the Mountains classification
A light blue jersey	Denotes the winner of the Points classification		

=== General classification ===
Final general classification (1–10)
Rank	Name	Team	Time
1	Éric Caritoux (FRA)	Skil	90h 08' 03"
2	Alberto Fernández Blanco (ESP)	Zor	+ 6"
3	Raimund Dietzen (GER)	Teka	+ 1' 33"
4	Pedro Delgado (ESP)	Reynolds	+ 1' 43"
5	Edgar Corredor (COL)	Teka	+ 3' 40"
6	Julián Gorospe (ESP)	Reynolds	+ 4' 41"
7	José Patrocinio Jiménez (COL)	Teka	+ 7' 10"
8	Vicente Belda (ESP)	Kelme	+ 7' 14"
9	José Recio (ESP)	Kelme	+ 7' 21"
10	Francesco Moser (ITA)	Tuc Gis	+ 8' 41"

=== Points classification ===
Final points classification (1-10)
	Rider	Team	Points
1	Guido Van Calster (BEL)	Del Tongo	204
2	Noël Dejonckheere (BEL)	Teka	168
3	Jozef Lieckens (BEL)	Safir	138
4	Francesco Moser (ITA)	Tuc Gis	110
5	Benny Van Brabant (BEL)	Tönissteiner	102
6	Jesús Suárez Cueva (ESP)	Hueso	98
7	Julián Gorospe (ESP)	Reynolds	96
8	Miguel Angel Iglesias (ESP)	Kelme	90
9	Éric Caritoux (FRA)	Skil	88
10	Raimund Dietzen (GER)	Teka	82

=== Mountains classification ===
Final mountains classification (1-5)
	Rider	Team	Points
1	Felipe Yáñez (ESP)	Orbea	81
2	José Luis Laguía (ESP)	Reynolds	59
3	Éric Caritoux (FRA)	Skil	50
4	Vicente Belda (ESP)	Kelme	49
5	Alberto Fernández Blanco (ESP)	Zor	40

=== Team classification ===
Final team classification (1-5)
	Team	Time
1	Teka	270h 24' 40"
2	Zor	+ 9' 35"
3	Reynolds	+ 20' 17"
4	Hueso	+ 23' 58"
5	Skil	+ 39' 25"

=== Intermediate sprints classification ===
Final intermediate sprints classification (1–5)
	Rider	Team	Points
1	Jozef Lieckens (BEL)	Safir	39
2	Eddy Van Haerens (BEL)	Safir	30
3	Mariano Bayon (ESP)	Dormilon	17
4	Antonio Coll (ESP)	Teka	12
5	Palmiro Masciarelli (ITA)	Tuc Gis	11

=== Special sprints classification ===
Final special sprints classification (1–3)
	Rider	Team	Points
1	Jesús Suárez Cueva (ESP)	Hueso	35
2	José Maria Caroz (ESP)	Dormilon	19
3	Daniël Rossel (BEL)	Tönissteiner	15
4	Jean-Claude Bagot (FRA)	Skil	13
5	Antonio Coll (ESP)	Teka	8
