= Benedito Ferreira =

Portuguese cyclist

Personal information
- Born: 28 February 1956 (age 70)

Cycling career
- Sport: Cycling
- Role: Rider

Benedito Ferreira (born 28 February 1956) is a Portuguese racing cyclist. He rode in the 1984 Tour de France.
