= Eernegem =

Town in West Flanders, Belgium

Coordinates: 51°08′N 3°01′E

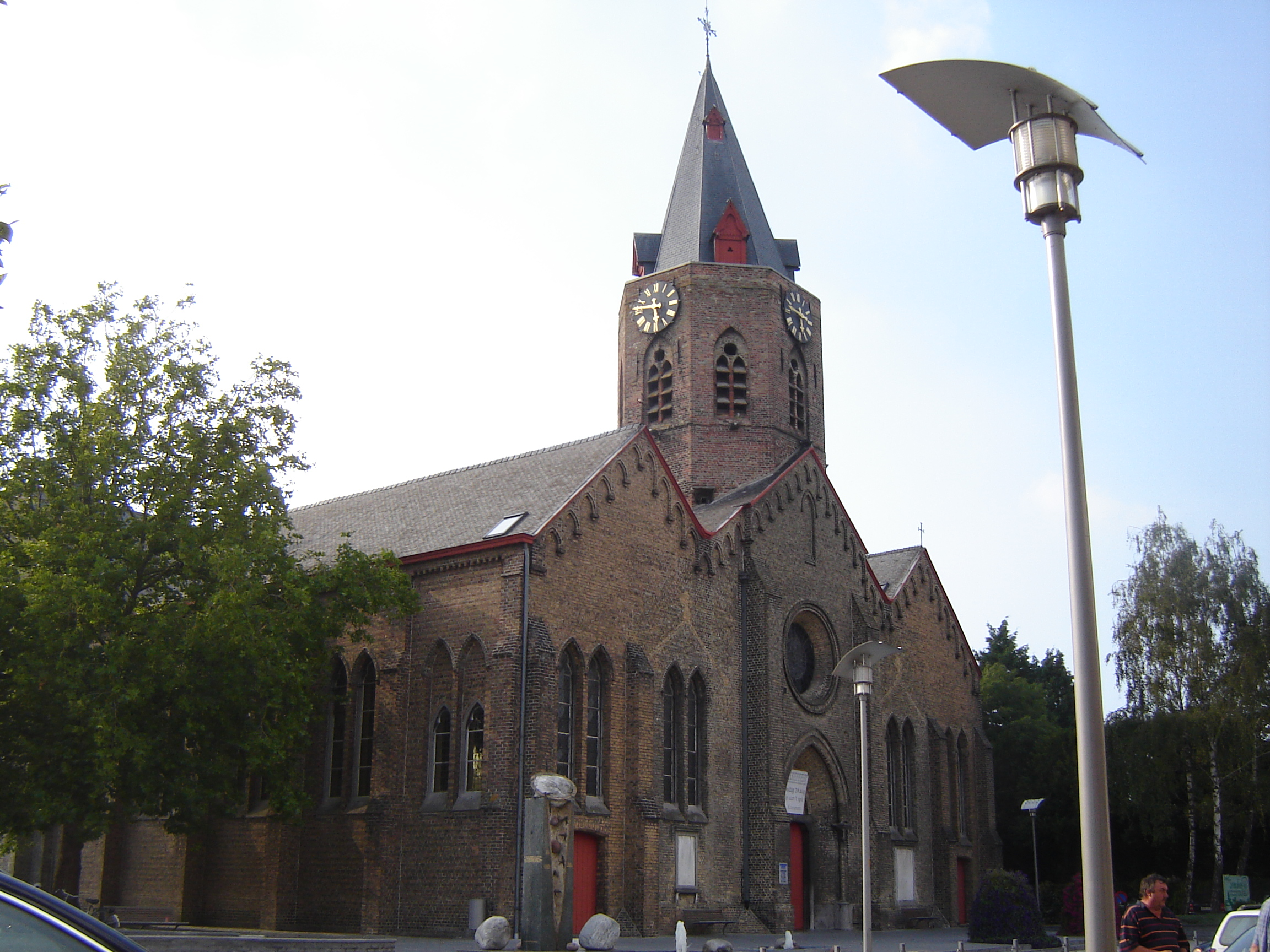
Church of Saint Medardus in Eernegem. Eernegem, Ichtegem, West Flanders, Belgium

Eernegem is a town in the Ichtegem municipality, in the province of West Flanders in Belgium.

The town contains a cemetery.
