= Jean-Luc Garnier =

French cyclist

Personal information
- Born: 22 May 1961 (age 65) Alès, France

Cycling career
- Sport: Cycling
- Role: Rider

Jean-Luc Garnier (born 22 May 1961) is a French former professional racing cyclist. He rode in the 1984 Tour de France.
