= Muhlenbach, Luxembourg City =

District of Luxembourg City, Luxembourg

Muhlenbach: Millebaach (Luxembourgish); Mühlenbach (German)
- District
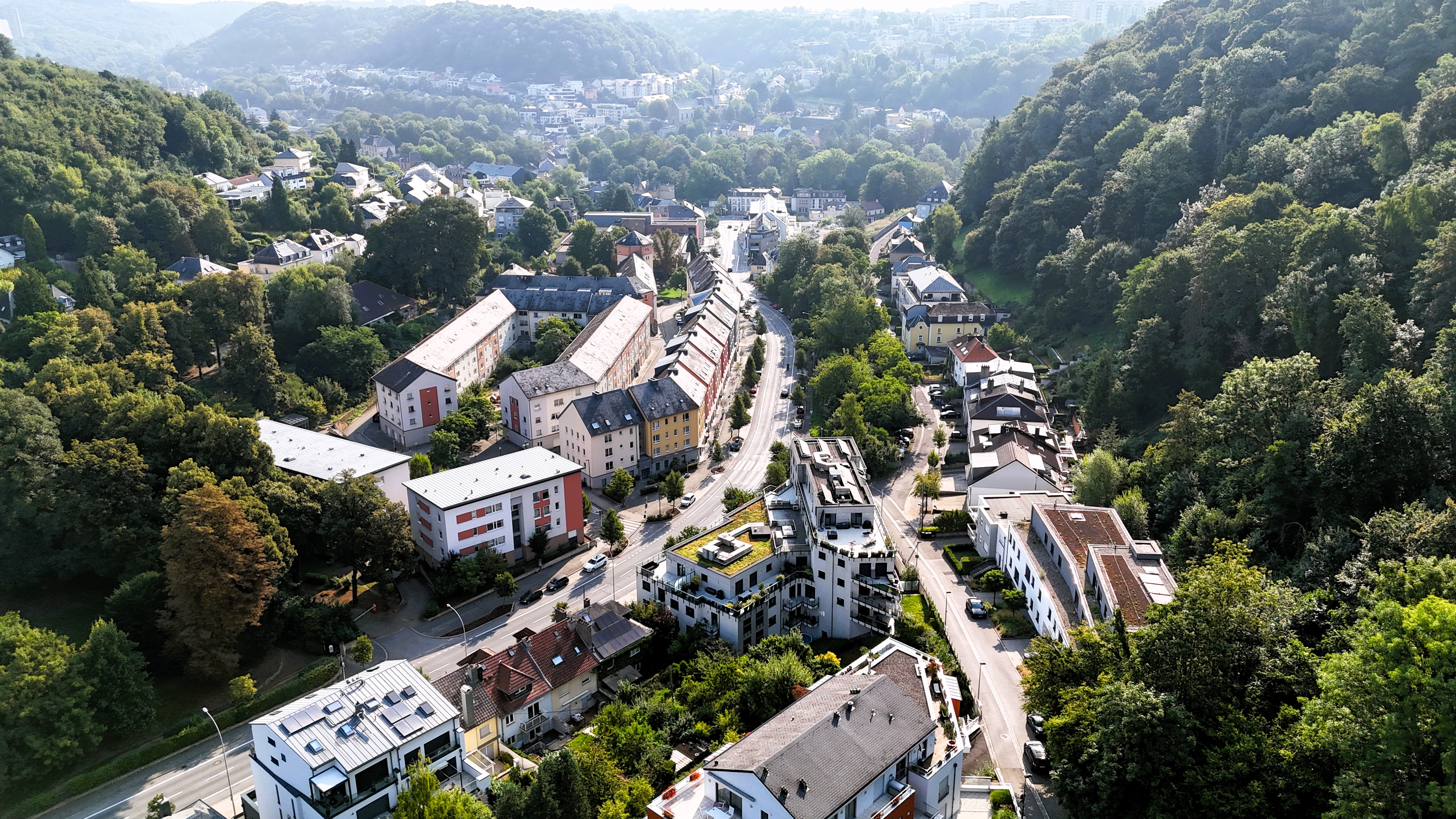

- Mühlenbach is one of 24 districts in Luxembourg City
- Coordinates: 49.6297°N 6.1191°E
- Country: Luxembourg
- Commune: Luxembourg City

Area
  - Total: 2.4281 km^{2} (0.9375 sq mi)

Population (31 December 2025)
  - Total: 2,528
  - Density: 1,041/km^{2} (2,697/sq mi)

Nationality
  - Luxembourgish: 32.16%
  - Other: 67.84%
- Website: Mühlenbach

Muhlenbach (Luxembourgish: Millebaach, pronounced [ˈmiləbaːχ]; German: Mühlenbach, pronounced [ˈmyːlənbax]) is a district in north-western Luxembourg City, in southern Luxembourg.

As of 31 December 2025, the district has a population of 2,528 inhabitants.
