= Palmiro Masciarelli =

Italian cyclist

Personal information
- Born: 7 January 1953 (age 73) Pescara, Italy

Cycling career
- Sport: Cycling
- Discipline: Road
- Role: Rider

Amateur team
- 1973–1975: Dragani Pescara

Professional teams
- 1976–1980: Sanson
- 1981–1982: Famcucine–Campagnolo
- 1983–1988: Gis Gelati

Major wins
- Grand Tours Giro d'Italia 2 individual stages (1981, 1983) Vuelta a España 1 individual stage (1984) One-day Races and Classics Coppa Bernocchi (1983)

Palmiro Masciarelli (born 7 January 1953) is an Italian former professional racing cyclist. He rode in one edition of the Tour de France, nine editions of the Giro d'Italia and one edition of the Vuelta a España, winning two stages of the Giro, and one of the Vuelta.

== Major results ==
1972
1st Overall Giro d'Abruzzo
1975
1st Gran Premio della Liberazione
1st Giro delle Due Province
1978
1st Stage 4 Tirreno–Adriatico
1979
2nd Trofeo Pantalica
8th Giro di Lombardia
1980
1st Stage 2 Giro del Trentino
3rd Giro dell'Umbria
1981
1st Stage 7 Giro d'Italia
2nd Overall Tour de l'Aude

1st Stage 1

2nd Coppa Placci
1982
1st GP Montelupo
2nd Trofeo Matteotti
6th Overall Grand Prix du Midi Libre
6th Tour of Flanders
1983
1st Coppa Bernocchi
1st Stage 10 Giro d'Italia
3rd Giro di Romagna
1984
1st Stage 10 Vuelta a España
8th Road race, UCI Road World Championships
1985
2nd Trofeo Matteotti
2nd Giro della Provincia di Reggio Calabria
1986
3rd Giro dell'Umbria
