= Manuel Cárdenas Espitia =

Colombian cyclist

Personal information
- Born: 21 June 1961 Villa de Leyva, Boyacá
- Died: 14 July 1990 La Calera, Cundinamarca

Cycling career
- Sport: Cycling
- Role: Rider

Manuel Cárdenas Espitia (21 June 1961 – 14 July 1990) was a Colombian professional racing cyclist. He rode in the 1984 and 1986 Tour de France.
