= Daniel Rossel =

Belgian cyclist

Personal information
- Born: 24 July 1960 (age 66) Uccle, Belgium

Cycling career
- Sport: Cycling
- Discipline: Road
- Role: Rider

Professional teams
- 1982–1983: Fangio–Assos–OM Iveco
- 1984: Tönissteiner–Lotto–Mavic
- 1985: Lotto
- 1986: Transvemij–Van Schilt

Daniël Rossel (born 24 July 1960) is a Belgian former racing cyclist. He won the 16th stage of the 1984 Vuelta a España.

== Major results ==
1978
1st Tour of Flanders Juniors
1983
2nd Paris-Bruxelles
3rd GP Stad Vilvoorde
1984
1st Stage 16 Vuelta a España
1st Le Samyn
6th GP Victor Standaert
1985
5th Brussel-Ingooigem
