= Julián Gorospe =

Spanish cyclist (born 1960)

Personal information
- Full name: Julián Gorospe Artabe
- Born: 22 March 1960 (age 66) Mañaria, Spain

Cycling career
- Sport: Cycling
- Current team: Retired
- Discipline: Road
- Role: Rider; Manager

Professional team
- 1982–1994: Reynolds

Managerial team
- 1998–2006: Euskaltel–Euskadi

Major wins
- Tour of the Basque Country (1983, 1990); Vuelta a España, 2 stages Tour de France, 1 stage

Julián Gorospe Artabe (born 22 March 1960 in Mañaria) is a Spanish former professional road racing cyclist, who rode professionally between 1982 and 1994, entirely for the Banesto team. Gorospe also worked as the directeur sportif of Euskaltel–Euskadi between 1998 and 2006.

== Major results ==
1977
1st Road race, National Junior Road Championships
1981
1st Memorial Valenciaga
1st Volta da Ascension
1982
2nd Overall Tour of the Basque Country

1st Stage 5b (ITT)

3rd Overall Volta a Catalunya
3rd Subida a Arrate
4th Overall Vuelta a Aragon

1st Stage 3b (ITT)

6th Grand Prix des Nations
1983
1st Overall Tour of the Basque Country

1st Stage 5b (ITT)

1st Trofeo Masferrer
2nd Prueba Villafranca de Ordizia
3rd Overall Vuelta a Aragon

1st Prologue

3rd Vuelta a las Tres Provincias
5th Overall Setmana Catalana de Ciclisme

1st Stage 3b

6th Overall Volta a Catalunya

1st Prologue & Stage 7 (ITT)

6th Overall Vuelta a Burgos

1st Stage 4b (ITT)

6th Grand Prix des Nations
1984
1st Overall Vuelta a Andalucía
1st Overall Vuelta a los Valles Mineros

1st Prologue

Tour of the Basque Country

1st Mountains classification
1st Stage 4

2nd Overall Vuelta a La Rioja
4th Overall Tour Midi-Pyrénées

1st Prologue & Stage 3

5th Overall Volta a Catalunya
6th Overall Vuelta a España

1st Stages 14 & 18b

6th Overall Critérium International
1985
1st Gran Premio de Llodio
2nd Subida al Naranco
3rd Overall Volta a Catalunya
9th Grand Prix des Nations
1986
1st Stage 19 Tour de France
1st Prologue Vuelta a Asturias
4th Overall Setmana Catalana de Ciclisme
1987
1st Klasika Primavera
1st Stage 3 Tour of Galicia
2nd Overall Grand Prix du Midi Libre
2nd Overall Vuelta a Asturias
3rd Overall Tour of the Basque Country
3rd Overall Volta a la Comunitat Valenciana
3rd Overall Vuelta a La Rioja
3rd Overall Vuelta a Andalucía
1988
1st Stage 4b Vuelta a Cantabria
2nd Overall Volta a la Comunitat Valenciana
3rd Overall Paris–Nice
3rd Overall Tour of the Basque Country
1989
6th Overall Tour of the Basque Country
1990
1st Overall Tour of the Basque Country

1st Stage 3

4th Overall Critérium International
1991
1st Stage 5 (TTT) Vuelta a Burgos
3rd Overall Vuelta a Murcia
3rd Overall Tour Méditerranéen
10th Overall Tour of the Basque Country
1992
1st Trofeo Comunidad Foral de Navarra
5th Overall Tour of the Basque Country
8th Overall Paris–Nice
1993
1st Overall Volta a la Comunitat Valenciana

1st Stage 5b (ITT)

1st Overall Vuelta a Andalucía
4th Overall Vuelta a Murcia
