= Guido Van Calster =

Belgian cyclist

Personal information
- Full name: Guido Van Calster
- Born: 6 February 1956 (age 70) Scherpenheuvel, Belgium

Cycling career
- Sport: Cycling
- Discipline: Road
- Role: Rider

Professional teams
- 1978: C&A
- 1979: DAF Trucks–Aida
- 1980-1: Splendor
- 1982-4: Del Tongo
- 1985: Ariostea–Oece
- 1986: Zor–BH
- 1987: BH
- 1988: Kas–Canal 10
- 1989: Lotto–Vlaanderen–Jong–Mbk–Merckx

Major wins
- Grand Tours Vuelta a España Points classification (1984) 2 individual stages (1984)

Guido Van Calster (born 6 February 1956) is a retired Belgian racing cyclist. He won the points classification in the 1984 Vuelta a España.

== Major results ==
1977
2nd Flèche Ardennaise
4th Overall Tour de l'Avenir

1st Stages 2, 7, 8 & 12

1978
1st Stage 5 La Méditerranéenne
3rd Paris–Tours
4th Road race, National Road Championships
8th Omloop Het Volk
9th Overall Ronde van Nederland
1979
3rd Overall Three Days of De Panne
7th Road race, National Road Championships
9th Tour of Flanders
10th Overall Tour of Belgium
10th Rund um den Henninger Turm
10th Ronde van Limburg
1980
1st Stage 2 Critérium du Dauphiné Libéré
4th La Flèche Wallonne
6th Overall Vuelta a España
6th Overall Tour of Belgium
7th Grand Prix de Wallonie
8th Liège–Bastogne–Liège
10th Overall Tour du Haut Var
10th Omloop Het Volk
10th Kampioenschap van Vlaanderen
1981
1st Stage 5a Tour of the Basque Country
2nd Brabantse Pijl
3rd La Flèche Wallonne
4th Overall Tour of Belgium

1st Stage 1b

4th Paris–Roubaix
5th Road race, UCI Road World Championships
5th Liège–Bastogne–Liège
6th Milan–San Remo
9th Grand Prix de Fourmies
1982
1st Druivenkoers Overijse
3rd Overall Tour de Suisse

1st Stages 4a & 5

4th Overall Deutschland Tour
4th Road race, National Road Championships
6th Overall Vuelta a Andalucía
1983
3rd Grand Prix Pino Cerami
8th La Flèche Wallonne
10th Liège–Bastogne–Liège
1984
Vuelta a España

1st Points classification
1st Stages 2 & 13

4th Overall Vuelta a Andalucía

1st Stage 2

5th Druivenkoers Overijse
7th Trofeo Matteotti
9th Road race, National Road Championships
1985
2nd Trofeo Pantalica
6th Liège–Bastogne–Liège
7th Overall Giro di Puglia
7th Grand Prix de Wallonie
8th Road race, National Road Championships
10th Rund um den Henninger Turm
1986
1st Stage 2 Vuelta a Castilla y León
9th Road race, National Road Championships
1987
1st Stage 5 Vuelta a Castilla y León
1st Stage 4 Vuelta a Aragón
