= Edgar Corredor =

Colombian cyclist

Personal information
- Born: 24 February 1960 (age 66) Sogamoso, Colombia

Cycling career
- Sport: Cycling
- Current team: Retired
- Discipline: Road
- Role: Rider
- Rider type: Climber

Amateur teams
- 1982: Lotería de Boyacá
- 1982: Colombia–Piles Varta

Professional teams
- 1984: Teka
- 1985–1990: Varta–Café de Colombia–Mavic
- 1991–1992: Sicasal–Acral

Edgar Corredor (born 24 February 1960) is a Colombian former professional racing cyclist. He rode in four editions of the Tour de France and five editions of the Vuelta a España.

== Major results ==
1982
8th Overall Vuelta a Colombia

1st Stages 1 & 12

1983
1st Stage 1 GP Tell
4th Overall Vuelta a Colombia
1984
3rd Overall Route du Sud
5th Overall Vuelta a España
1985
1st Stage 1 Tour de l'Avenir
1986
5th Overall Vuelta a Colombia

1st Stage 3

7th Overall Circuit Cycliste Sarthe
1987
4th Overall Volta a Catalunya
1988
10th Overall Volta a Catalunya
10th Overall Route du Sud
10th Trofeo Masferrer
1990
3rd Trofeo Masferrer
1991
1st Overall Vuelta a Aragón
1992
9th Overall Vuelta a Aragón
9th Overall Volta a Portugal
