= Noël Dejonckheere =

Belgian cyclist (1955–2022)

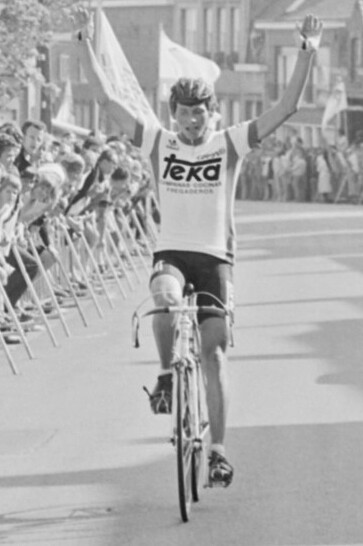
- Noël Dejonckheere in 1981

Personal information
- Born: 23 April 1955 Lendelede, Belgium
- Died: 29 December 2022 (aged 67) Izegem, Belgium

Cycling career
- Sport: Cycling
- Discipline: Road
- Role: Rider

Professional teams
- 1979–1981: Teka
- 1982: Gis Gelati–Olmo
- 1983–1987: Teka
- 1988: Seur–Campagnolo–Bic

Managerial teams
- 1989–1996: 7-Eleven
- 2010–2016: BMC Racing Team

Major wins
- Grand Tours Vuelta a España 6 individual stages (1979, 1983, 1984)

Noël Dejonckheere (23 April 1955 – 29 December 2022) was a Belgian professional road cyclist. After retiring, he worked as a sports director for 7-Eleven and the BMC Racing Team.

Dejonckheere died on 29 December 2022, at the age of 67.

== Major results ==
1976
1st Quad Cities
1978
1st Points race, UCI Amateur Track World Championships
Coors Classic

1st Stages 5 & 8

1979
1st Overall Costa del Azahar

1st Stages 1 & 3

1st Stage 2b Tour Méditerranéen
1st Stage 5a Deutschland Tour
1st Stage 2 GP Leganes
Vuelta a España

1st Stages 10 & 11

Volta a la Comunitat Valenciana

1st Stages 1, 2, 4, 5 & 6

Vuelta a Cantabria

1st Stages 1 & 2a

1980
1st Stage 3 Paris–Nice
1st Stage 4 Tour Méditerranéen
1st Stage 5 Vuelta a Aragón
1st Stage 3 Vuelta a Mallorca
Volta a la Comunitat Valenciana

1st Stages 2 & 5

Vuelta a Andalucía

1st Stages 2 & 4

1981
1st Trofeo Luis Puig
1st Stage 1 Vuelta a La Rioja
Volta a la Comunitat Valenciana

1st Stages 2 & 5

Vuelta a Castilla y León

1st Stages 1 & 2

3rd Omloop van de Westhoek
1982
1st Stage 7b Deutschland Tour
1st Stage 3a Ruota d'Oro
2nd Milano–Torino
6th Milano–Vignola
6th Giro del Friuli
6th Coppa Sabatini
8th Coppa Bernocchi
1983
1st Overall Costa del Azahar

1st Stage 1

1st Trofeo Luis Puig
1st Stage 12 Vuelta a España
1st Stage 3b Volta a Catalunya
1st Stage 2b Vuelta a Cantabria
Vuelta a Andalucía

1st Stages 1 & 3

Vuelta a Castilla y León

1st Stages 2 & 3

8th Milan–San Remo
1984
1st Ronde van Limburg
1st Trofeo Luis Puig
1st Stage 3 Paris–Nice
1st Stage 2a Vuelta a la Comunidad Valenciana
Vuelta a España

1st Stages 1, 4 & 19

5th Road race, National Road Championships
8th Milan–San Remo
10th Overall Vuelta a Andalucía

1st Stage 5a

1985
1st Trofeo Masferrer
1st Stage 2 Vuelta a Castilla y León
1st Stage 2 Tour of Galicia
Vuelta a Burgos

1st Stages 1 & 2

Vuelta a Cantabria

1st Stages 1 & 4

Vuelta a Aragón

1st Stages 2 & 3

1986
3rd Trofeo Masferrer
1987
1st Stage 2 Vuelta a Andalucía
Vuelta a Murcia

1st Stages 1b & 4

1988
1st Stage 1 Vuelta a Andalucía

=== Grand Tour general classification results timeline ===
Grand Tour	1979	1980	1981	1982	1983	1984	1985	1986	1987	1988
Giro d'Italia	—	—	—	100	—	—	—	—	—	—
Tour de France	—	—	DNF	—	—	DNF	—	—	—	—
Vuelta a España	63	—	—	—	DNF	74	94	—	—	DNF
