= Reimund Dietzen =

German cyclist (born 1959)

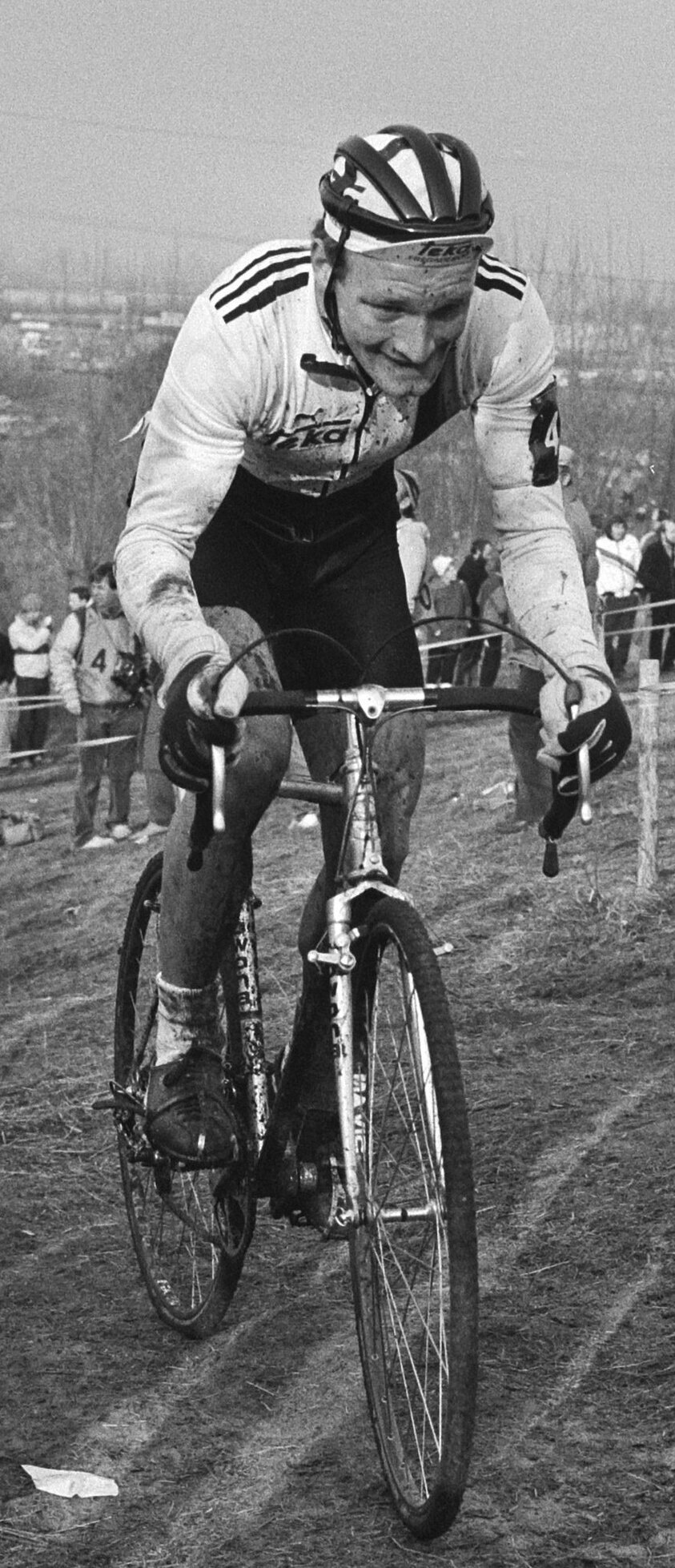

Personal information
- Full name: Reimund Dietzen
- Born: 29 May 1959 (age 67) Trier, Germany

Cycling career
- Sport: Cycling
- Discipline: Road
- Role: Directeur sportif
- Rider type: All-rounder

Professional teams
- 1982: Puch - Eorotex - Campagnolo
- 1983–1990: Teka

Major wins
- Grand Tours Vuelta a España 3 individual stages (1984, 1986, 1989) One-day races and Classics National Road Race Championship (1984, 1986)

Reimund Dietzen sometimes written Raimund Dietzen (born 29 May 1959 in Trier, Rhineland-Palatinate) is a retired road and cyclo-cross cyclist from Germany, who was a professional rider from 1982 to 1990.

== Cycling career ==
Dietzen was a successful amateur winning the German cyclo-cross championship in 1980 and 1981 as well as winning in road races. He turned professional with the Swiss team Puch in 1982. He won the cyclo-cross race the Grand Prix Jean Bausch-Pierre Kellner that year. The following year he joined a Spanish cycling team Teka with whom he would stay with for the rest of his career. In his first year with his new team he won the Volta a la Comunitat Valenciana. The following year he became the champion of Germany in the road race and cyclo-cross as well his first stage victory in the Vuelta a España. He won the stage to the Lagos de Covadonga which is a very steep climb and a prestigious stage to win. He would finish that year's edition of the Vuelta third overall. The following year he was again cyclo-cross champion as well as the winner of the Vuelta a Cantabria. In 1986 he was again German road champion and won a second stage in the 1986 Vuelta a España. In 1987 he wore the leader's jersey in the 1987 Vuelta a España for five days before losing it to Herrera and then finishing the race second overall to Luis Herrera of Colombia. Dietzen finished the 1988 Vuelta a España second overall, this time to Sean Kelly of Ireland. In the 1989 Vuelta a España, Dietzen won a stage but several days later he crashed. He had ridden into a tunnel which was not illuminated and crashed, suffering career-ending injuries. He was only 30 years of age when the following year he stopped as a professional after not recovering. Seventeen years later, the Supreme Court of Spain ordered the organisers of the Vuelta a España to pay damages to Dietzen. Dietzen obtained nearly all of his success in Spanish races with wins in Vuelta a La Rioja, Vuelta a Castilla y León, the Setmana Catalana de Ciclisme and he finished in the top 10 of every Vuelta a España between 1984-1988, three of which were on the podium.

== Post-cycling career ==
From 2003, Dietzen was a directeur sportif with the now-defunct Team Gerolsteiner. He lives in Spain.

== Career achievements ==
=== Major results ===
Cyclo-cross
1981–1982
1st Grand Prix Jean Bausch-Pierre Kellner
2nd National Championships
1983–1984
1st National Championships
1984–1985
1st National Championships
Road
1981
Grand Prix Guillaume Tell

1st Stages 3 & 4

3rd Paris–Roubaix Espoirs
1982
1st Trofeo Luis Puig
7th Overall Tour de Luxembourg
1983
1st Overall Volta a la Comunitat Valenciana

1st Stage 4

2nd Road race, National Road Championships
3rd Overall Setmana Catalana de Ciclisme

1st Prologue

3rd Clásica de San Sebastián
1984
1st Road race, National Road Championships
1st Stage 1 Vuelta Asturias
2nd Overall Setmana Catalana de Ciclisme
2nd Clásica de San Sebastián
3rd Overall Vuelta a España

1st Stage 12

3rd Clásica a los Puertos de Guadarrama
1985
1st Overall Vuelta a Cantabria

1st Stage 2

2nd Overall Vuelta a Burgos
2nd Overall Vuelta Asturias
3rd Overall Tour of Galicia
7th Overall Vuelta a España
1986
1st Road race, National Road Championships
1st Overall Vuelta a Cantabria

1st Stage 3

1st Stage 4a Vuelta a Murcia
1st Stage 5 Vuelta a Aragón
4th Overall Vuelta a España

1st Stage 12

7th Overall Tour of the Basque Country
7th Overall Setmana Catalana de Ciclisme
1987
1st Overall Vuelta a La Rioja

1st Prologue

2nd Overall Vuelta a España
2nd Subida al Naranco
3rd Overall Vuelta a Aragón
1988
1st Overall Vuelta a Castilla y León

1st Stage 3

2nd Overall Vuelta a España
3rd Subida al Naranco
1989
1st Overall Setmana Catalana de Ciclisme
1st Stage 9 Vuelta a España

=== Grand Tour general classification results timeline ===
Grand Tour	1982	1983	1984	1985	1986	1987	1988	1989
Vuelta a España	40	DNF	3	7	4	2	2	DNF
Giro d'Italia	Did not contest during his career							
Tour de France	DNF	—	64	—	DNF	90	83	—

Legend
—	Did not compete
DNF	Did not finish
