= Éric Caritoux =

French cyclist

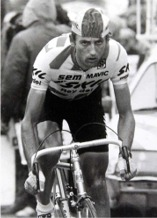
- Riding for SKIL Team, managed by Jean de Gribaldy, 1984.

Personal information
- Full name: Éric Caritoux
- Born: 16 August 1960 (age 66) Carpentras, France
- Height: 1.72 m (5 ft 8 in)
- Weight: 65 kg (143 lb)

Cycling career
- Sport: Cycling
- Discipline: Road
- Role: Rider

Professional teams
- 1983: Sem–France Loire–Reydel–Mavic
- 1984–1985: Skil–Reydel–Sem–Mavic
- 1986–1987: Fagor
- 1988: Kas–Canal 10
- 1989–1992: RMO
- 1993–1994: Chazal–Vetta–MBK

Major wins
- Grand Tours Vuelta a España General classification (1984) 1 individual stage (1984) Single-day races and Classics National Road Race Championships (1988, 1989)

Éric Caritoux (born 16 August 1960 in Carpentras, Vaucluse) is a French former professional road racing cyclist who raced between 1983 and 1994. He had 22 victories in his career, the highlights of which were winning the Vuelta a España in 1984 and taking the French road race championships in 1988 and 1989. He rode the Tour de France on 11 occasions, his best finish being 12th in 1989.

== Early years ==
Caritoux was born in Carpentras in Provence at the foot of Mont Ventoux. He first started cycle racing as a junior with the local club in Carpentras, he developed into a strong climber riding in the hilly Vaucluse region and often using Mont Ventoux in his training rides. As an amateur Caritoux won the 1982 edition of the Tour du Vaucluse Open beating future Tour de France winner Laurent Fignon into second place, he clinched that victory by winning the 15 kilometre mountain time trial up Mont Ventoux between Bédoin and Chalet Reynard. That win persuaded Jean de Gribaldy manager of the Sem–France Loire professional squad to sign Caritoux for the 1983 season.

The 1983 SEM team had Sean Kelly as team leader and Caritoux soon fitted into the role of Kelly's main helper in stage races. In 1984, Skil became main team sponsors (making the Skil–Sem team) and Éric showed that he had potential to be more than just Kelly's helper in the mountains, he started the season by taking the Tour du Haut Var, a tough hilly one day race in the south of France and then won the Orange to Mont Ventoux stage of Paris–Nice. He was then given a short break in early April by his manager as the team concentrated on the spring classics for Sean Kelly, races which did not suit Caritoux.

== 1984 Vuelta a España victory ==
The story of Caritoux's victory in the 1984 Vuelta a España is quite extraordinary in that he won a Grand Tour as a second year professional which is quite unusual. However, even more unusual is that, one week before the start, neither Caritoux or his team had any intention of actually riding the race. At that time the Vuelta started in the second half of April and the Skil manager Jean de Gribaldy had made a promise at the start of the year to the Vuelta organisers that his team would be on the start line. A promise he had forgotten about but the organisers had not, de Gribaldy was threatened with a £50,000 fine if the team did not ride, he had to scrape together a squad for the Vuelta at the last minute, this included the holidaying Caritoux, who was told to get to Geneva and then fly to Jerez de la Frontera in the south of Spain where the Vuelta was starting.

Caritoux rode himself into form and won the race's first mountain stage which finished on top of the Rassos de Peguera in the Pyrenees, he then rode admirably on stage 12 which finished at the Lagos de Covadonga summit and took over the leaders Gold Jersey from Pedro Delgado. Nobody, including Caritoux himself, thought he could hold the lead until the race finish a week later, his team was weak and he had no support in the mountains. However, Caritoux did hold the lead and went into the final day with a 37 seconds lead, the final stage was a time trial, Caritoux was no time trialler and nearest rival Alberto Fernandez was. Caritoux rode the time trial knowing this might be his only chance to win a major race, his determination came through and won the 1984 Vuelta a España by a mere six seconds.

== Latter years ==
Impressively, Caritoux showed his performance in the 1984 Vuelta was real by returning the following year and once again competing with the elite General Classification riders. He finished in 6th place overall, but then joined the poorly organised Fagor team for the 1986 season and had two years of modest results. He rejoined Sean Kelly in 1988 at the Kas squad and had more success, taking the French road race championships. In 1989 he joined RMO to work with team leader Charly Mottet and repeated his French championship win. He stayed with RMO until the team folded in 1992 and then switched to the small Chazal team run by manager Vincent Lavenu for the final two years of his career, Éric was team leader at Chazal and mentor for the team's younger professionals of which the team was mostly composed of. During the 1993 Tour de France his Chazal–Vetta–MBK team was chosen by the Tour as a wildcard invitation and he was their highest placed rider in 37th place. Most of their riders finished around 100th place but also on this team was a young Jaan Kirsipuu who later in his career would win several sprint stages in the Tour de France. In 1994 the Tour de France's 15th stage finished in Eric's home town of Carpentras and he was hoping to grab glory in his final year as a pro, however he was foiled by lone breakaway Eros Poli, Caritoux finished in a group with race leader Miguel Induráin at two minutes behind Poli.

Between 1983 and 1994, Caritoux was a consistent rider in the Tour de France, finishing in the top 40 ten times and breaking into the top 20 on five occasions.

Éric Caritoux retired from professional cycling at the end of the 1994 season at the age of 34. He today owns his own vineyard and holiday business in the Carpentras area and has recently worked on the Tour de France as a courtesy driver for the guests of France Telecom.

== Career achievements ==
=== Major results ===
1982
1st Overall Tour du Vaucluse

1st Stage 4

1983
1st Grand Prix d'Aix-en-Provence
1st Stage 4 Tour du Vaucluse
1984
1st Overall Vuelta a España

1st Stage 7

1st Tour du Haut-Var
1st Bol d'Or des Monédières
2nd Polynormande
3rd GP Ouest France–Plouay
4th Overall Tour Méditerranéen
6th Overall Tour of the Basque Country
7th Road race, UCI Road World Championships
8th Overall Paris–Nice

1st Stage 4a

8th Paris–Tours
1985
1st Overall Flèche du Sud
2nd Overall Tour Méditérranéen

1st Stage 2

2nd Overall Grand Prix du Midi-Libre
6th Overall Vuelta a España
6th Overall Critérium du Dauphiné Libéré
6th Subida a Arrate
7th Overall Setmana Catalana de Ciclisme
7th Overall Paris–Nice
1986
1st Trophée des Grimpeurs
3rd Tour de Vendée
4th Overall Grand Prix du Midi-Libre
5th Overall 4 Jours de Dunkerque
5th Overall Paris–Nice
5th Overall Étoile de Bessèges
1988
1st Road race, National Road Championships
5th Overall Tour Méditerranéen
7th Overall Critérium du Dauphiné Libéré
1989
1st Road race, National Road Championships
1st Bol d'Or des Monédières
2nd Polynormande
3rd Critérium des As
3rd Overall Tour du Vaucluse
7th Overall Critérium du Dauphiné Libéré
8th Overall Paris–Nice
8th Overall Étoile de Bessèges
1990
1st Stage 3b Grand Prix du Midi-Libre
2nd Grand Prix de la Ville de Rennes
3rd Overall Tour d'Armorique
1991
1st Tour du Haut-Var
1st Prix d'Aix-en-Provence
3rd Coppa Placci
8th Overall Paris–Nice
10th Overall Tour Méditerranéen
1992
4th Rund um den Henninger Turm
9th GP Ouest France–Plouay
10th Overall Tour de Romandie
1993
1st Stage 2 Tour de l'Ain
2nd Tour de Berne
3rd Trophée des Grimpeurs
6th Overall Critérium du Dauphiné Libéré
1994
7th Overall Grand Prix du Midi-Libre
8th Classique des Alpes
9th Overall Critérium du Dauphiné Libéré

=== Grand Tour general classification results timeline ===
Grand Tour	1983	1984	1985	1986	1987	1988	1989	1990	1991	1992	1993	1994
Vuelta a España	—	1	6	—	—	11	—	—	—	—	—	—
Giro d'Italia	—	—	—	—	21	—	—	—	—	—	—	—
Tour de France	24	14	34	20	23	18	12	DNF	17	37	37	22

Legend
—	Did not compete
DNF	Did not finish
