= 1984 Tour de France, Stage 12 to Stage 23 =

Cycling race stages

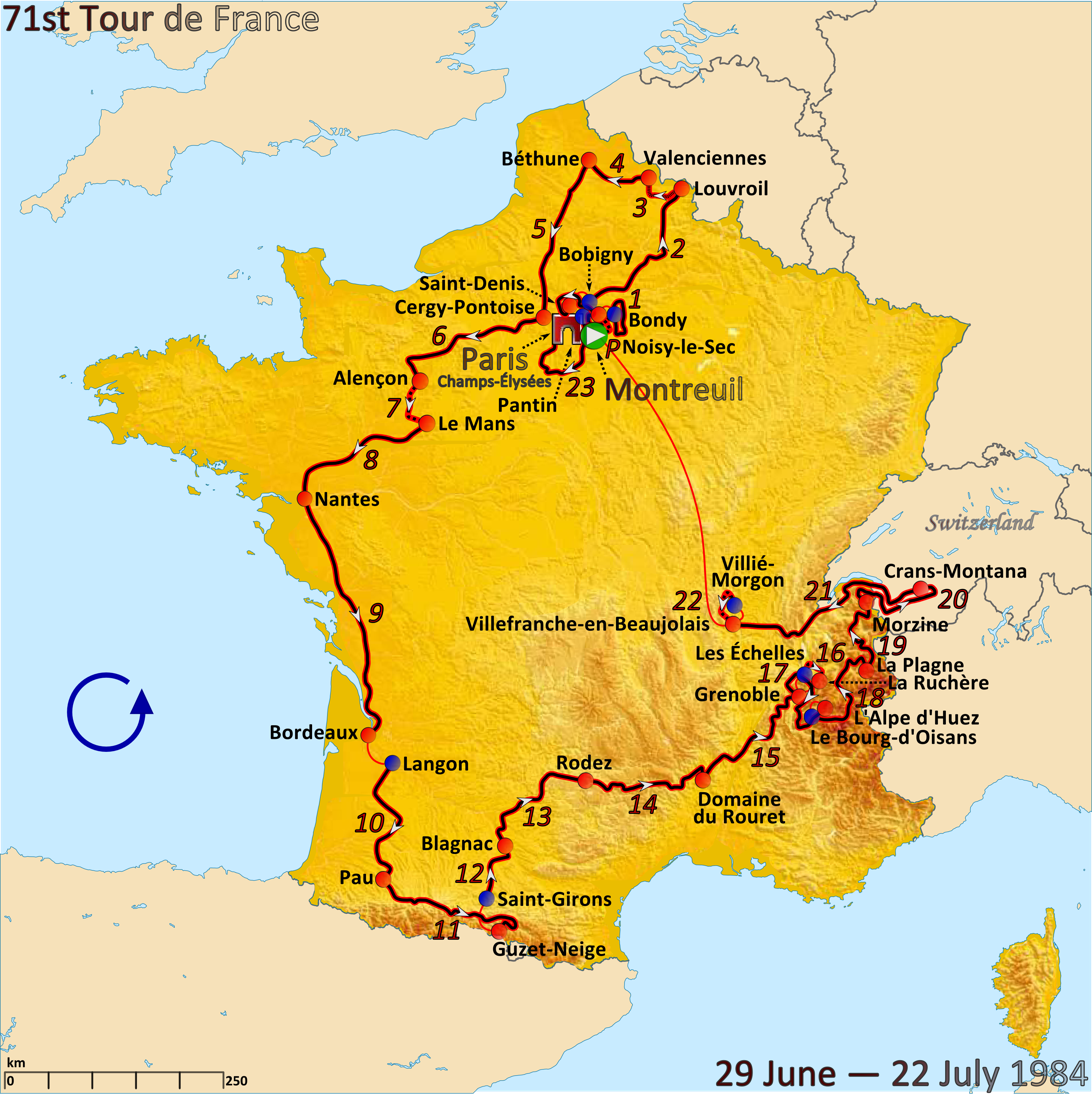
Route of the 1984 Tour de France

The 1984 Tour de France was the 71st edition of Tour de France, one of cycling's Grand Tours. The Tour began in Montreuil with a prologue individual time trial on 29 June and Stage 12 occurred on 10 July with a flat stage from Saint-Girons. The race finished on the Champs-Élysées in Paris on 22 July.

== Stage 12 ==
10 July 1984 — Saint-Girons to Blagnac, 111 km (69.0 mi)

Stage 12 result

Rank	Rider	Team	Time
1	Pascal Poisson (FRA)	Renault–Elf	2h 39' 46"
2	Eric Vanderaerden (BEL)	Panasonic–Raleigh	s.t.
3	Leo van Vliet (NED)	Kwantum–Decosol–Yoko	s.t.
4	Bernard Vallet (FRA)	La Vie Claire–Terraillon	s.t.
5	Frank Hoste (BEL)	Europ Decor–Boule d'Or–Eddy Merckx	s.t.
6	Jean-Louis Gauthier (FRA)	Coop–Hoonved–Rossin	+ 8"
7	Frédéric Brun (FRA)	Peugeot–Shell–Michelin	+ 12"
8	Guy Nulens (BEL)	Panasonic–Raleigh	+ 14"
9	Henri Manders (NED)	Kwantum–Decosol–Yoko	+ 56"
10	Kim Andersen (DEN)	Coop–Hoonved–Rossin	+ 57"

General classification after stage 12

Rank	Rider	Team	Time
1	Vincent Barteau (FRA)	Renault–Elf	54h 17' 18"
2	Maurice Le Guilloux (FRA)	La Vie Claire–Terraillon	+ 7' 47"
3	Laurent Fignon (FRA)	Renault–Elf	+ 10' 25"
4	Gerard Veldscholten (NED)	Panasonic–Raleigh	+ 12' 28"
5	Bernard Hinault (FRA)	La Vie Claire–Terraillon	+ 12' 38"
6	Phil Anderson (AUS)	Panasonic–Raleigh	+ 13' 29"
7	Greg LeMond (USA)	Renault–Elf	+ 14' 23"
8	Sean Kelly (IRL)	Skil–Reydel–Sem	+ 14' 31"
9	Pedro Delgado (ESP)	Reynolds	+ 14' 37"
10	Robert Millar (GBR)	Peugeot–Shell–Michelin	+ 14' 47"

== Stage 13 ==
11 July 1984 — Blagnac to Rodez, 220.5 km (137.0 mi)

Stage 13 result

Rank	Rider	Team	Time
1	Pierre-Henri Menthéour (FRA)	Renault–Elf	6h 03' 23"
2	Dominique Garde (FRA)	Peugeot–Shell–Michelin	+ 1"
3	Kim Andersen (DEN)	Coop–Hoonved–Rossin	+ 3"
4	Sean Kelly (IRL)	Skil–Reydel–Sem	+ 6' 55"
5	Frank Hoste (BEL)	Europ Decor–Boule d'Or–Eddy Merckx	s.t.
6	Eric Vanderaerden (BEL)	Panasonic–Raleigh	s.t.
7	Jean-Philippe Vandenbrande (BEL)	Mondial Moquette–Splendor	s.t.
8	Patrick Bonnet (FRA)	Système U	s.t.
9	Leo van Vliet (NED)	Kwantum–Decosol–Yoko	s.t.
10	Bernard Hinault (FRA)	La Vie Claire–Terraillon	s.t.

General classification after stage 13

Rank	Rider	Team	Time
1	Vincent Barteau (FRA)	Renault–Elf	60h 27' 39"
2	Maurice Le Guilloux (FRA)	La Vie Claire–Terraillon	+ 8' 07"
3	Laurent Fignon (FRA)	Renault–Elf	+ 10' 25"
4	Gerard Veldscholten (NED)	Panasonic–Raleigh	+ 12' 28"
5	Bernard Hinault (FRA)	La Vie Claire–Terraillon	+ 12' 38"
6	Phil Anderson (AUS)	Panasonic–Raleigh	+ 13' 29"
7	Pierre-Henri Menthéour (FRA)	Renault–Elf	+ 14' 18"
8	Greg LeMond (USA)	Renault–Elf	+ 14' 23"
9	Sean Kelly (IRL)	Skil–Reydel–Sem	+ 14' 31"
10	Pedro Delgado (ESP)	Reynolds	+ 14' 37"

== Stage 14 ==
12 July 1984 — Rodez to Domaine du Rouret, 227.5 km (141.4 mi)

Stage 14 result

Rank	Rider	Team	Time
1	Fons De Wolf (BEL)	Europ Decor–Boule d'Or–Eddy Merckx	6h 00' 45"
2	Laurent Fignon (FRA)	Renault–Elf	+ 17' 40"
3	Bernard Hinault (FRA)	La Vie Claire–Terraillon	s.t.
4	Phil Anderson (AUS)	Panasonic–Raleigh	s.t.
5	Peter Winnen (NED)	Panasonic–Raleigh	s.t.
6	Patrick Bonnet (FRA)	Système U	+ 17' 45"
7	Frank Hoste (BEL)	Europ Decor–Boule d'Or–Eddy Merckx	+ 17' 46"
8	Eric Vanderaerden (BEL)	Panasonic–Raleigh	+ 17' 48"
9	Leo van Vliet (NED)	Kwantum–Decosol–Yoko	s.t.
10	Jean-François Rault (FRA)	La Vie Claire–Terraillon	s.t.

General classification after stage 14

Rank	Rider	Team	Time
1	Vincent Barteau (FRA)	Renault–Elf	66h 46' 16"
2	Maurice Le Guilloux (FRA)	La Vie Claire–Terraillon	+ 8' 07"
3	Laurent Fignon (FRA)	Renault–Elf	+ 10' 13"
4	Fons De Wolf (BEL)	Europ Decor–Boule d'Or–Eddy Merckx	+ 11' 42"
5	Bernard Hinault (FRA)	La Vie Claire–Terraillon	+ 12' 26"
6	Gerard Veldscholten (NED)	Panasonic–Raleigh	+ 12' 28"
7	Phil Anderson (AUS)	Panasonic–Raleigh	+ 13' 17"
8	Greg LeMond (USA)	Renault–Elf	+ 14' 23"
9	Sean Kelly (IRL)	Skil–Reydel–Sem	+ 14' 27"
10	Pedro Delgado (ESP)	Reynolds	+ 14' 37"

== Stage 15 ==
13 July 1984 — Domaine du Rouret to Grenoble, 241.5 km (150.1 mi)

Stage 15 result

Rank	Rider	Team	Time
1	Frédéric Vichot (FRA)	Skil–Reydel–Sem	7h 05' 42"
2	Michel Laurent (FRA)	Coop–Hoonved–Rossin	+ 15"
3	Laurent Fignon (FRA)	Renault–Elf	+ 21"
4	Sean Kelly (IRL)	Skil–Reydel–Sem	s.t.
5	Vincent Barteau (FRA)	Renault–Elf	s.t.
6	Bernard Hinault (FRA)	La Vie Claire–Terraillon	s.t.
7	Pascal Jules (FRA)	Renault–Elf	s.t.
8	Greg LeMond (USA)	Renault–Elf	s.t.
9	Celestino Prieto (ESP)	Reynolds	s.t.
10	Dominique Garde (FRA)	Peugeot–Shell–Michelin	s.t.

General classification after stage 15

Rank	Rider	Team	Time
1	Vincent Barteau (FRA)	Renault–Elf	73h 52' 19"
2	Laurent Fignon (FRA)	Renault–Elf	+ 10' 13"
3	Bernard Hinault (FRA)	La Vie Claire–Terraillon	+ 12' 26"
4	Gerard Veldscholten (NED)	Panasonic–Raleigh	+ 12' 28"
5	Phil Anderson (AUS)	Panasonic–Raleigh	+ 13' 17"
6	Greg LeMond (USA)	Renault–Elf	+ 14' 23"
7	Sean Kelly (IRL)	Skil–Reydel–Sem	+ 14' 27"
8	Pedro Delgado (ESP)	Reynolds	+ 14' 37"
9	Robert Millar (GBR)	Peugeot–Shell–Michelin	+ 14' 56"
10	Peter Winnen (NED)	Panasonic–Raleigh	+ 16' 42"

== Stage 16 ==
15 July 1984 — Les Échelles to La Ruchère, 22 km (14 mi) (ITT)

Stage 16 result

Rank	Rider	Team	Time
1	Laurent Fignon (FRA)	Renault–Elf	42' 11"
2	Luis Herrera (COL)	Colombia–Varta	+ 25"
3	Pedro Delgado (ESP)	Reynolds	+ 32"
4	Bernard Hinault (FRA)	La Vie Claire–Terraillon	+ 33"
5	Julián Gorospe (ESP)	Reynolds	+ 41"
6	Ángel Arroyo (ESP)	Reynolds	+ 1' 09"
7	Sean Kelly (IRL)	Skil–Reydel–Sem	+ 1' 21"
8	Robert Millar (GBR)	Peugeot–Shell–Michelin	+ 1' 26"
9	Phil Anderson (AUS)	Panasonic–Raleigh	+ 1' 30"
10	Beat Breu (SUI)	Cilo–Aufina	s.t.

General classification after stage 16

Rank	Rider	Team	Time
1	Vincent Barteau (FRA)	Renault–Elf	74h 38' 14"
2	Laurent Fignon (FRA)	Renault–Elf	+ 6' 29"
3	Bernard Hinault (FRA)	La Vie Claire–Terraillon	+ 9' 15"
4	Phil Anderson (AUS)	Panasonic–Raleigh	+ 11' 03"
5	Gerard Veldscholten (NED)	Panasonic–Raleigh	+ 11' 16"
6	Pedro Delgado (ESP)	Reynolds	+ 11' 25"
7	Sean Kelly (IRL)	Skil–Reydel–Sem	+ 12' 04"
8	Greg LeMond (USA)	Renault–Elf	+ 12' 33"
9	Robert Millar (GBR)	Peugeot–Shell–Michelin	+ 12' 50"
10	Ángel Arroyo (ESP)	Reynolds	+ 14' 31"

== Stage 17 ==
16 July 1984 — Grenoble to Alpe d'Huez, 151 km (94 mi)

Stage 17 result

Rank	Rider	Team	Time
1	Luis Herrera (COL)	Colombia–Varta	4h 39' 24"
2	Laurent Fignon (FRA)	Renault–Elf	+ 49"
3	Ángel Arroyo (ESP)	Reynolds	+ 2' 27"
4	Robert Millar (GBR)	Peugeot–Shell–Michelin	+ 3' 05"
5	Rafaël Antonio Acevedo (COL)	Colombia–Varta	+ 3' 09"
6	Greg LeMond (USA)	Renault–Elf	+ 3' 30"
7	Bernard Hinault (FRA)	La Vie Claire–Terraillon	+ 3' 44"
8	Pascal Simon (FRA)	Peugeot–Shell–Michelin	+ 3' 58"
9	Pablo Wilches (COL)	Mondial Moquette–Splendor	+ 4' 10"
10	Pedro Muñoz Machín Rodríguez (ESP)	Teka	+ 4' 12"

General classification after stage 17

Rank	Rider	Team	Time
1	Laurent Fignon (FRA)	Renault–Elf	79h 24' 56"
2	Vincent Barteau (FRA)	Renault–Elf	+ 4' 22"
3	Bernard Hinault (FRA)	La Vie Claire–Terraillon	+ 5' 41"
4	Robert Millar (GBR)	Peugeot–Shell–Michelin	+ 8' 25"
5	Greg LeMond (USA)	Renault–Elf	+ 12' 38"
6	Gerard Veldscholten (NED)	Panasonic–Raleigh	+ 8' 45"
7	Ángel Arroyo (ESP)	Reynolds	+ 9' 40"
8	Phil Anderson (AUS)	Panasonic–Raleigh	+ 11' 09"
9	Luis Herrera (COL)	Colombia–Varta	+ 11' 12"
10	Pedro Delgado (ESP)	Reynolds	+ 13' 13"

== Stage 18 ==
17 July 1984 — Le Bourg-d'Oisans to La Plagne, 185.5 km (115.3 mi)

Stage 18 result

Rank	Rider	Team	Time
1	Laurent Fignon (FRA)	Renault–Elf	6h 12' 45"
2	Jean-Marie Grezet (SUI)	Skil–Reydel–Sem	+ 1' 04"
3	Greg LeMond (USA)	Renault–Elf	+ 1' 07"
4	Pedro Delgado (ESP)	Reynolds	+ 1' 27"
5	Robert Millar (GBR)	Peugeot–Shell–Michelin	+ 1' 44"
6	Pascal Simon (FRA)	Peugeot–Shell–Michelin	+ 2' 12"
7	Sean Kelly (IRL)	Skil–Reydel–Sem	+ 2' 30"
8	Pedro Muñoz Machín Rodríguez (ESP)	Teka	+ 2' 33"
9	Claude Criquielion (BEL)	Mondial Moquette–Splendor	+ 2' 45"
10	Bernard Hinault (FRA)	La Vie Claire–Terraillon	+ 2' 58"

General classification after stage 18

Rank	Rider	Team	Time
1	Laurent Fignon (FRA)	Renault–Elf	85h 37' 41"
2	Bernard Hinault (FRA)	La Vie Claire–Terraillon	+ 8' 39"
3	Greg LeMond (USA)	Renault–Elf	+ 9' 52"
4	Robert Millar (GBR)	Peugeot–Shell–Michelin	+ 10' 09"
5	Pedro Delgado (ESP)	Reynolds	+ 14' 40"
6	Pascal Simon (FRA)	Peugeot–Shell–Michelin	+ 15' 45"
7	Sean Kelly (IRL)	Skil–Reydel–Sem	+ 16' 31"
8	Ángel Arroyo (ESP)	Reynolds	+ 18' 12"
9	Niki Rüttimann (SUI)	La Vie Claire–Terraillon	+ 21' 04"
10	Claude Criquielion (BEL)	Mondial Moquette–Splendor	+ 21' 07"

== Stage 19 ==
18 July 1984 — La Plagne to Morzine, 186 km (116 mi)

Stage 19 result

Rank	Rider	Team	Time
1	Ángel Arroyo (ESP)	Reynolds	6h 16' 25"
2	Sean Kelly (IRL)	Skil–Reydel–Sem	+ 1' 14"
3	Phil Anderson (AUS)	Panasonic–Raleigh	s.t.
4	Bernard Hinault (FRA)	La Vie Claire–Terraillon	s.t.
5	Laurent Fignon (FRA)	Renault–Elf	s.t.
6	Pascal Simon (FRA)	Peugeot–Shell–Michelin	s.t.
7	Pedro Muñoz Machín Rodríguez (ESP)	Teka	s.t.
8	Greg LeMond (USA)	Renault–Elf	s.t.
9	Robert Millar (GBR)	Peugeot–Shell–Michelin	+ 1' 21"
10	Peter Winnen (NED)	Panasonic–Raleigh	+ 1' 23"

General classification after stage 19

Rank	Rider	Team	Time
1	Laurent Fignon (FRA)	Renault–Elf	91h 55' 20"
2	Bernard Hinault (FRA)	La Vie Claire–Terraillon	+ 8' 39"
3	Greg LeMond (USA)	Renault–Elf	+ 9' 52"
4	Robert Millar (GBR)	Peugeot–Shell–Michelin	+ 10' 16"
5	Pascal Simon (FRA)	Peugeot–Shell–Michelin	+ 15' 45"
6	Sean Kelly (IRL)	Skil–Reydel–Sem	+ 16' 21"
7	Ángel Arroyo (ESP)	Reynolds	+ 16' 58"
8	Pedro Delgado (ESP)	Reynolds	+ 17' 37"
9	Pedro Muñoz Machín Rodríguez (ESP)	Teka	+ 21' 11"
10	Niki Rüttimann (SUI)	La Vie Claire–Terraillon	+ 22' 54"

== Stage 20 ==
19 July 1984 — Morzine to Crans-Montana (Switzerland), 140.5 km (87.3 mi)

Stage 20 result

Rank	Rider	Team	Time
1	Laurent Fignon (FRA)	Renault–Elf	4h 09' 16"
2	Ángel Arroyo (ESP)	Reynolds	+ 11"
3	Pablo Wilches (COL)	Mondial Moquette–Splendor	+ 17"
4	Pascal Jules (FRA)	Renault–Elf	+ 34"
5	Julián Gorospe (ESP)	Reynolds	+ 49"
6	Pedro Muñoz Machín Rodríguez (ESP)	Teka	+ 1' 07"
7	José Antonio Agudelo Gómez (COL)	Colombia–Varta	+ 1' 08"
8	Sean Kelly (IRL)	Skil–Reydel–Sem	+ 1' 10"
9	Pascal Simon (FRA)	Peugeot–Shell–Michelin	+ s.t.
10	Bernard Hinault (FRA)	La Vie Claire–Terraillon	+ 1' 17"

General classification after stage 20

Rank	Rider	Team	Time
1	Laurent Fignon (FRA)	Renault–Elf	96h 04' 36"
2	Bernard Hinault (FRA)	La Vie Claire–Terraillon	+ 9' 56"
3	Greg LeMond (USA)	Renault–Elf	+ 11' 09"
4	Robert Millar (GBR)	Peugeot–Shell–Michelin	+ 11' 49"
5	Pascal Simon (FRA)	Peugeot–Shell–Michelin	+ 16' 55"
6	Ángel Arroyo (ESP)	Reynolds	+ 17' 09"
7	Sean Kelly (IRL)	Skil–Reydel–Sem	+ 17' 31"
8	Pedro Muñoz Machín Rodríguez (ESP)	Teka	+ 22' 18"
9	Claude Criquielion (BEL)	Mondial Moquette–Splendor	+ 25' 12"
10	Niki Rüttimann (SUI)	La Vie Claire–Terraillon	+ 26' 28"

== Stage 21 ==
20 July 1984 — Crans-Montana (Switzerland) to Villefranche-sur-Saône, 320.5 km (199.1 mi)

Stage 21 result

Rank	Rider	Team	Time
1	Frank Hoste (BEL)	Europ Decor–Boule d'Or–Eddy Merckx	9h 28' 08"
2	Jacques Hanegraaf (NED)	Kwantum–Decosol–Yoko	s.t.
3	Sean Kelly (IRL)	Skil–Reydel–Sem	s.t.
4	Bernard Hinault (FRA)	La Vie Claire–Terraillon	s.t.
5	Henri Manders (NED)	Kwantum–Decosol–Yoko	s.t.
6	Gilbert Glaus (SUI)	Cilo–Aufina	s.t.
7	Francis Castaing (FRA)	Peugeot–Shell–Michelin	s.t.
8	Ad Wijnands (NED)	Kwantum–Decosol–Yoko	s.t.
9	Jean-Philippe Vandenbrande (BEL)	Mondial Moquette–Splendor	+ s.t.
10	Phil Anderson (AUS)	Panasonic–Raleigh	s.t.

General classification after stage 21

Rank	Rider	Team	Time
1	Laurent Fignon (FRA)	Renault–Elf	105h 32' 44"
2	Bernard Hinault (FRA)	La Vie Claire–Terraillon	+ 9' 56"
3	Greg LeMond (USA)	Renault–Elf	+ 11' 05"
4	Robert Millar (GBR)	Peugeot–Shell–Michelin	+ 11' 45"
5	Sean Kelly (IRL)	Skil–Reydel–Sem	+ 16' 35"
6	Pascal Simon (FRA)	Peugeot–Shell–Michelin	+ 16' 51"
7	Ángel Arroyo (ESP)	Reynolds	+ 17' 05"
8	Pedro Muñoz Machín Rodríguez (ESP)	Teka	+ 22' 18"
9	Claude Criquielion (BEL)	Mondial Moquette–Splendor	+ 25' 12"
10	Niki Rüttimann (SUI)	La Vie Claire–Terraillon	+ 26' 28"

== Stage 22 ==
21 July 1984 — Villié-Morgon to Villefranche-sur-Saône, 51 km (32 mi) (ITT)

Stage 22 result

Rank	Rider	Team	Time
1	Laurent Fignon (FRA)	Renault–Elf	1h 07' 19"
2	Sean Kelly (IRL)	Skil–Reydel–Sem	s.t.
3	Bernard Hinault (FRA)	La Vie Claire–Terraillon	+ 36"
4	Greg LeMond (USA)	Renault–Elf	+ 41"
5	Phil Anderson (AUS)	Panasonic–Raleigh	+ 1' 24"
6	Ángel Arroyo (ESP)	Reynolds	+ 2' 17"
7	Robert Millar (GBR)	Peugeot–Shell–Michelin	+ 2' 57"
8	Julián Gorospe (ESP)	Reynolds	+ 2' 59"
9	Frédéric Brun (FRA)	Peugeot–Shell–Michelin	+ 3' 06"
10	Jean-Marie Grezet (SUI)	Skil–Reydel–Sem	s.t.

General classification after stage 22

Rank	Rider	Team	Time
1	Laurent Fignon (FRA)	Renault–Elf	106h 40' 03"
2	Bernard Hinault (FRA)	La Vie Claire–Terraillon	+ 10' 32"
3	Greg LeMond (USA)	Renault–Elf	+ 11' 46"
4	Robert Millar (GBR)	Peugeot–Shell–Michelin	+ 14' 42"
5	Sean Kelly (IRL)	Skil–Reydel–Sem	+ 16' 35"
6	Ángel Arroyo (ESP)	Reynolds	+ 19' 22"
7	Pascal Simon (FRA)	Peugeot–Shell–Michelin	+ 21' 17"
8	Pedro Muñoz Machín Rodríguez (ESP)	Teka	+ 26' 17"
9	Claude Criquielion (BEL)	Mondial Moquette–Splendor	+ 29' 12"
10	Phil Anderson (AUS)	Panasonic–Raleigh	+ 29' 16"

== Stage 23 ==
22 July 1984 — Pantin to Paris Champs-Élysées, 196.5 km (122.1 mi)

Stage 23 result

Rank	Rider	Team	Time
1	Eric Vanderaerden (BEL)	Panasonic–Raleigh	5h 23' 37"
2	Pascal Jules (FRA)	Renault–Elf	s.t.
3	Frank Hoste (BEL)	Europ Decor–Boule d'Or–Eddy Merckx	s.t.
4	Bernard Hinault (FRA)	La Vie Claire–Terraillon	s.t.
5	Sean Kelly (IRL)	Skil–Reydel–Sem	s.t.
6	Gilbert Glaus (SUI)	Cilo–Aufina	s.t.
7	Phil Anderson (AUS)	Panasonic–Raleigh	s.t.
8	Jacques Hanegraaf (NED)	Kwantum–Decosol–Yoko	s.t.
9	Henri Manders (NED)	Kwantum–Decosol–Yoko	s.t.
10	Leo van Vliet (NED)	Kwantum–Decosol–Yoko	s.t.

General classification after stage 23

Rank	Rider	Team	Time
1	Laurent Fignon (FRA)	Renault–Elf	112h 03' 40"
2	Bernard Hinault (FRA)	La Vie Claire–Terraillon	+ 10' 32"
3	Greg LeMond (USA)	Renault–Elf	+ 11' 46"
4	Robert Millar (GBR)	Peugeot–Shell–Michelin	+ 14' 42"
5	Sean Kelly (IRL)	Skil–Reydel–Sem	+ 16' 35"
6	Ángel Arroyo (ESP)	Reynolds	+ 19' 22"
7	Pascal Simon (FRA)	Peugeot–Shell–Michelin	+ 21' 17"
8	Pedro Muñoz Machín Rodríguez (ESP)	Teka	+ 26' 17"
9	Claude Criquielion (BEL)	Mondial Moquette–Splendor	+ 29' 12"
10	Phil Anderson (AUS)	Panasonic–Raleigh	+ 29' 16"
