= 1984 Tour de France, Prologue to Stage 11 =

Cycling race stages

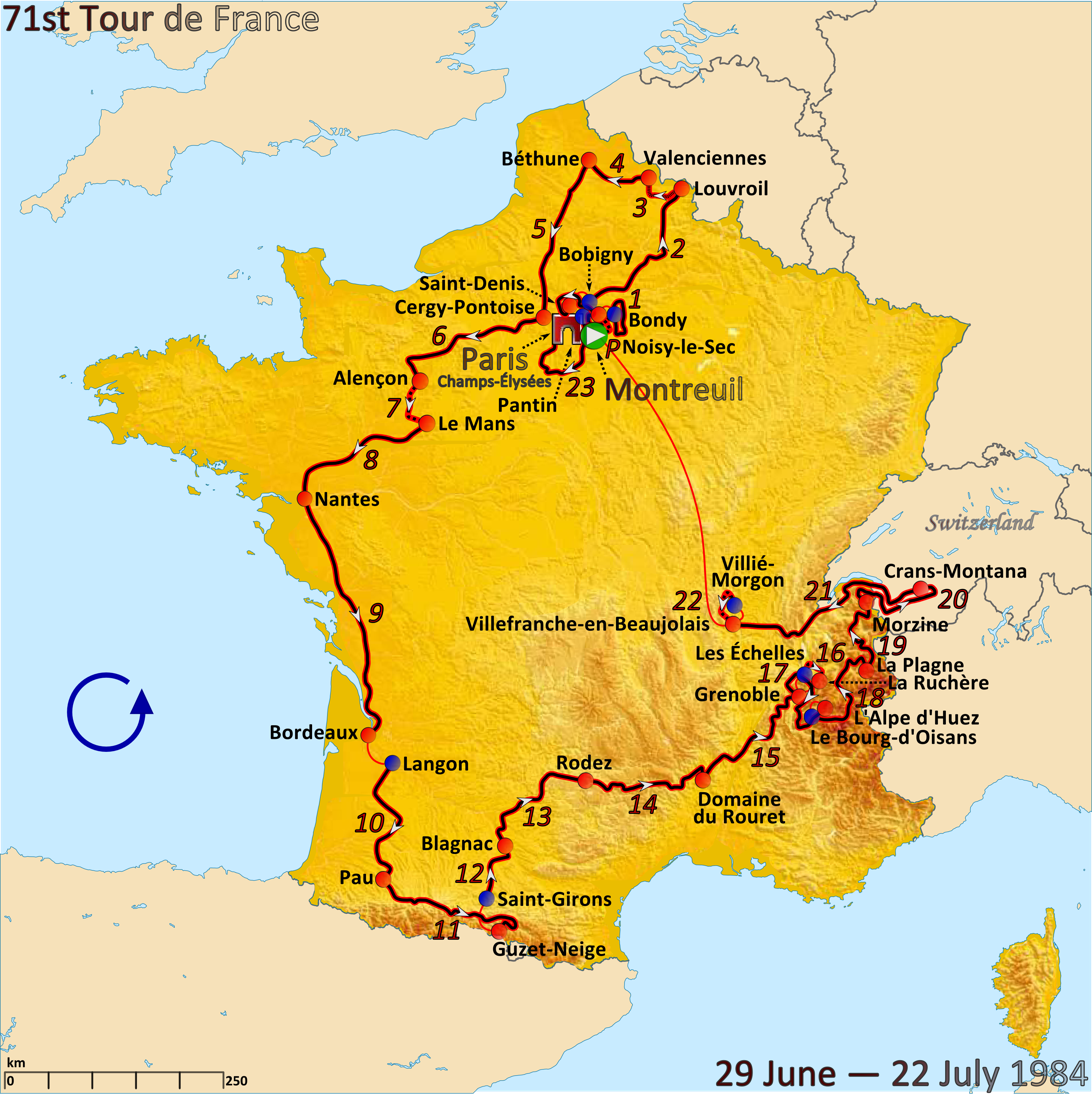
Route of the 1984 Tour de France

The 1984 Tour de France was the 71st edition of Tour de France, one of cycling's Grand Tours. The Tour began in Montreuil with a prologue individual time trial on 29 June and Stage 11 occurred on 9 July with a mountainous stage to Guzet-Neige. The race finished on the Champs-Élysées in Paris on 22 July.

== Prologue ==
29 June 1984 — Montreuil to Noisy-le-Sec, 5.4 km (3.4 mi) (ITT)

Prologue result and general classification after prologue

Rank	Rider	Team	Time
1	Bernard Hinault (FRA)	La Vie Claire–Terraillon	6' 39"
2	Laurent Fignon (FRA)	Renault–Elf	+ 3"
3	Allan Peiper (AUS)	Peugeot–Shell–Michelin	+ 9"
4	Phil Anderson (AUS)	Panasonic–Raleigh	s.t.
5	Sean Yates (GBR)	Peugeot–Shell–Michelin	+ 10"
6	Jean-Luc Vandenbroucke (BEL)	La Redoute	+ 11"
7	Stephen Roche (IRL)	La Redoute	+ 12"
8	Joop Zoetemelk (NED)	Kwantum–Decosol–Yoko	s.t.
9	Greg LeMond (USA)	Renault–Elf	s.t.
10	Gerrie Knetemann (NED)	Europ Decor–Boule d'Or–Eddy Merckx	+ 14"

== Stage 1 ==
30 June 1984 — Bondy to Saint-Denis, 148.5 km (92.3 mi)

Stage 1 result

Rank	Rider	Team	Time
1	Frank Hoste (BEL)	Europ Decor–Boule d'Or–Eddy Merckx	3h 27' 18"
2	Jean-François Rault (FRA)	La Vie Claire–Terraillon	s.t.
3	Allan Peiper (AUS)	Peugeot–Shell–Michelin	s.t.
4	Eddy Planckaert (BEL)	Panasonic–Raleigh	s.t.
5	Sean Kelly (IRL)	Skil–Reydel–Sem	s.t.
6	Vincent Barteau (FRA)	Renault–Elf	s.t.
7	Gilbert Glaus (SUI)	Cilo–Aufina	s.t.
8	Jean-Philippe Vandenbrande (BEL)	Kwantum–Decosol–Yoko	s.t.
9	Greg LeMond (USA)	Renault–Elf	s.t.
10	Frédéric Vichot (FRA)	Skil–Reydel–Sem	s.t.

General classification after stage 1

Rank	Rider	Team	Time
1	Ludo Peeters (BEL)	Kwantum–Decosol–Yoko	3h 33' 48"
2	Frank Hoste (BEL)	Europ Decor–Boule d'Or–Eddy Merckx	+ 4"
3	Allan Peiper (AUS)	Peugeot–Shell–Michelin	+ 8"
4	Bernard Hinault (FRA)	La Vie Claire–Terraillon	+ 9"
5	Jacques Hanegraaf (NED)	Kwantum–Decosol–Yoko	+ 11"
6	Laurent Fignon (FRA)	Renault–Elf	+ 12"
7	Phil Anderson (AUS)	Panasonic–Raleigh	+ 18"
8	Sean Yates (GBR)	Peugeot–Shell–Michelin	+ 19"
9	Jean-Luc Vandenbroucke (BEL)	La Redoute	+ 20"
10	Stephen Roche (IRL)	La Redoute	+ 21"

== Stage 2 ==
1 July 1984 — Bobigny to Louvroil, 249.5 km (155.0 mi)

Stage 2 result

Rank	Rider	Team	Time
1	Marc Madiot (FRA)	Renault–Elf	7h 00' 31"
2	Kim Andersen (DEN)	Coop–Hoonved–Rossin	+ 2"
3	Stephen Roche (IRL)	La Redoute	+ 3"
4	Rudy Rogiers (BEL)	Mondial Moquette–Splendor	s.t.
5	Eric Vanderaerden (BEL)	Panasonic–Raleigh	+ 7"
6	Francis Castaing (FRA)	Peugeot–Shell–Michelin	s.t.
7	Sean Kelly (IRL)	Skil–Reydel–Sem	s.t.
8	Noël Dejonckheere (BEL)	Teka	s.t.
9	Frank Hoste (BEL)	Europ Decor–Boule d'Or–Eddy Merckx	s.t.
10	Allan Peiper (AUS)	Peugeot–Shell–Michelin	s.t.

General classification after stage 2

Rank	Rider	Team	Time
1	Jacques Hanegraaf (NED)	Kwantum–Decosol–Yoko	10h 34' 17"
2	Adri van der Poel (NED)	Kwantum–Decosol–Yoko	+ 1"
3	Kim Andersen (DEN)	Coop–Hoonved–Rossin	+ 8"
4	Marc Madiot (FRA)	Renault–Elf	s.t.
5	Jean-Luc Vandenbroucke (BEL)	La Redoute	+ 9"
6	Ludo Peeters (BEL)	Kwantum–Decosol–Yoko	s.t.
7	Allan Peiper (AUS)	Peugeot–Shell–Michelin	+ 13"
8	Frank Hoste (BEL)	Europ Decor–Boule d'Or–Eddy Merckx	s.t.
9	Greg LeMond (USA)	Renault–Elf	+ 14"
10	Phil Anderson (AUS)	Panasonic–Raleigh	+ 15"

== Stage 3 ==
2 July 1984 — Louvroil to Valenciennes, 51 km (32 mi) (TTT)

Stage 3 result

Rank	Team	Time
1	Renault–Elf	1h 03' 54"
2	Panasonic–Raleigh	+ 4"
3	Kwantum–Decosol–Yoko	+ 4"
4	Peugeot–Shell–Michelin	+ 32"
5	Carrera–Inoxpran	+ 32"
6	Europ Decor–Boule d'Or–Eddy Merckx	+ 40"
7	La Vie Claire–Terraillon	+ 55"
8	Coop–Hoonved–Rossin	+ 1' 15"
9	Skil–Reydel–Sem	+ 1' 22"
10	Cilo–Aufina	+ 1' 39"

General classification after stage 3

Rank	Rider	Team	Time
1	Jacques Hanegraaf (NED)	Kwantum–Decosol–Yoko	11h 38' 15"
2	Adri van der Poel (NED)	Kwantum–Decosol–Yoko	+ 1"
3	Marc Madiot (FRA)	Renault–Elf	+ 4"
4	Ludo Peeters (BEL)	Kwantum–Decosol–Yoko	+ 9"
5	Greg LeMond (USA)	Renault–Elf	+ 10"
6	Laurent Fignon (FRA)	Renault–Elf	+ 13"
7	Phil Anderson (AUS)	Panasonic–Raleigh	+ 15"
8	Eric Vanderaerden (BEL)	Panasonic–Raleigh	+ 23"
9	Joop Zoetemelk (NED)	Kwantum–Decosol–Yoko	+ 30"
10	Pascal Jules (FRA)	Renault–Elf	+ 33"

== Stage 4 ==
2 July 1984 — Valenciennes to Béthune, 83 km (52 mi)

Stage 4 result

Rank	Rider	Team	Time
1	Ferdi Van Den Haute (BEL)	La Redoute	2h 19' 03"
2	Noël Dejonckheere (BEL)	Teka	+ 1' 02"
3	Adri van der Poel (NED)	Kwantum–Decosol–Yoko	s.t.
4	Eric Vanderaerden (BEL)	Panasonic–Raleigh	s.t.
5	Frank Hoste (BEL)	Europ Decor–Boule d'Or–Eddy Merckx	s.t.
6	Jean-François Rault (FRA)	La Vie Claire–Terraillon	s.t.
7	Leo van Vliet (NED)	Kwantum–Decosol–Yoko	s.t.
8	Jean-Philippe Vandenbrande (BEL)	Mondial Moquette–Splendor	s.t.
9	Phil Anderson (AUS)	Panasonic–Raleigh	s.t.
10	Francis Castaing (FRA)	Peugeot–Shell–Michelin	s.t.

General classification after stage 4

Rank	Rider	Team	Time
1	Adri van der Poel (NED)	Kwantum–Decosol–Yoko	13h 58' 11"
2	Phil Anderson (AUS)	Panasonic–Raleigh	+ 8"
3	Jacques Hanegraaf (NED)	Kwantum–Decosol–Yoko	+ 9"
4	Marc Madiot (FRA)	Renault–Elf	+ 13"
5	Ludo Peeters (BEL)	Kwantum–Decosol–Yoko	+ 18"
6	Greg LeMond (USA)	Renault–Elf	+ 19"
7	Laurent Fignon (FRA)	Renault–Elf	+ 22"
8	Eric Vanderaerden (BEL)	Panasonic–Raleigh	+ 32"
9	Joop Zoetemelk (NED)	Kwantum–Decosol–Yoko	+ 39"
10	Pascal Jules (FRA)	Renault–Elf	+ 42"

== Stage 5 ==
3 July 1984 — Béthune to Cergy-Pontoise, 207 km (129 mi)

Stage 5 result

Rank	Rider	Team	Time
1	Paulo Ferreira (POR)	Sporting Lisboa–Raposeira	4h 49' 45"
2	Vincent Barteau (FRA)	Renault–Elf	s.t.
3	Maurice Le Guilloux (FRA)	La Vie Claire–Terraillon	+ 1"
4	Bernard Vallet (FRA)	La Vie Claire–Terraillon	+ 17' 41"
5	Eddy Planckaert (BEL)	Panasonic–Raleigh	+ 17' 42"
6	Sean Kelly (IRL)	Skil–Reydel–Sem	s.t.
7	Leo van Vliet (NED)	Kwantum–Decosol–Yoko	s.t.
8	Frank Hoste (BEL)	Europ Decor–Boule d'Or–Eddy Merckx	s.t.
9	Eric Vanderaerden (BEL)	Panasonic–Raleigh	s.t.
10	Jean-François Chaurin (FRA)	Coop–Hoonved–Rossin	s.t.

General classification after stage 5

Rank	Rider	Team	Time
1	Vincent Barteau (FRA)	Renault–Elf	18h 47' 53"
2	Maurice Le Guilloux (FRA)	La Vie Claire–Terraillon	+ 1' 33"
3	Paulo Ferreira (POR)	Sporting Lisboa–Raposeira	+ 3' 13"
4	Adri van der Poel (NED)	Kwantum–Decosol–Yoko	+ 17' 45"
5	Phil Anderson (AUS)	Panasonic–Raleigh	+ 17' 53"
6	Jacques Hanegraaf (NED)	Kwantum–Decosol–Yoko	+ 17' 54"
7	Marc Madiot (FRA)	Renault–Elf	+ 17' 58"
8	Ludo Peeters (BEL)	Kwantum–Decosol–Yoko	+ 18' 03"
9	Greg LeMond (USA)	Renault–Elf	+ 18' 04"
10	Laurent Fignon (FRA)	Renault–Elf	+ 18' 07"

== Stage 6 ==
4 July 1984 — Cergy-Pontoise to Alençon, 202 km (126 mi)

Stage 6 result

Rank	Rider	Team	Time
1	Frank Hoste (BEL)	Europ Decor–Boule d'Or–Eddy Merckx	5h 15' 13"
2	Eddy Planckaert (BEL)	Panasonic–Raleigh	s.t.
3	Gilbert Glaus (SUI)	Cilo–Aufina	s.t.
4	Noël Dejonckheere (BEL)	Teka	s.t.
5	Eric Vanderaerden (BEL)	Panasonic–Raleigh	s.t.
6	Leo van Vliet (NED)	Kwantum–Decosol–Yoko	s.t.
7	Francis Castaing (FRA)	Peugeot–Shell–Michelin	s.t.
8	Adri van der Poel (NED)	Kwantum–Decosol–Yoko	s.t.
9	Frédéric Vichot (FRA)	Skil–Reydel–Sem	s.t.
10	Jean-Philippe Vandenbrande (BEL)	Mondial Moquette–Splendor	s.t.

General classification after stage 6

Rank	Rider	Team	Time
1	Vincent Barteau (FRA)	Renault–Elf	24h 02' 58"
2	Maurice Le Guilloux (FRA)	La Vie Claire–Terraillon	+ 1' 41"
3	Paulo Ferreira (POR)	Sporting Lisboa–Raposeira	+ 3' 21"
4	Phil Anderson (AUS)	Panasonic–Raleigh	+ 17' 33"
5	Adri van der Poel (NED)	Kwantum–Decosol–Yoko	+ 17' 53"
6	Eric Vanderaerden (BEL)	Panasonic–Raleigh	+ 17' 55"
7	Jacques Hanegraaf (NED)	Kwantum–Decosol–Yoko	+ 18' 02"
8	Marc Madiot (FRA)	Renault–Elf	+ 18' 06"
9	Ludo Peeters (BEL)	Kwantum–Decosol–Yoko	+ 18' 11"
10	Laurent Fignon (FRA)	Renault–Elf	s.t.

== Stage 7 ==
5 July 1984 — Alençon to Le Mans, 67 km (42 mi) (ITT)

Stage 7 result

Rank	Rider	Team	Time
1	Laurent Fignon (FRA)	Renault–Elf	1h 27' 33"
2	Sean Kelly (IRL)	Skil–Reydel–Sem	+ 16"
3	Bernard Hinault (FRA)	La Vie Claire–Terraillon	+ 49"
4	Stephen Roche (IRL)	Carrera–Inoxpran	+ 1' 07"
5	Gerard Veldscholten (NED)	Panasonic–Raleigh	+ 1' 11"
6	Phil Anderson (AUS)	Panasonic–Raleigh	+ 1' 24"
7	Roberto Visentini (ITA)	Carrera–Inoxpran	+ 1' 53"
8	Gerrie Knetemann (NED)	Europ Decor–Boule d'Or–Eddy Merckx	+ 1' 58"
9	Kim Andersen (DEN)	Coop–Hoonved–Rossin	+ 2' 03"
10	Greg LeMond (USA)	Renault–Elf	+ 2' 08"

General classification after stage 7

Rank	Rider	Team	Time
1	Vincent Barteau (FRA)	Renault–Elf	25h 35' 48"
2	Maurice Le Guilloux (FRA)	La Vie Claire–Terraillon	+ 3' 07"
3	Paulo Ferreira (POR)	Sporting Lisboa–Raposeira	+ 9' 57"
4	Laurent Fignon (FRA)	Renault–Elf	+ 12' 54"
5	Phil Anderson (AUS)	Panasonic–Raleigh	+ 13' 40"
6	Bernard Hinault (FRA)	La Vie Claire–Terraillon	+ 14' 23"
7	Gerard Veldscholten (NED)	Panasonic–Raleigh	+ 14' 33"
8	Greg LeMond (USA)	Renault–Elf	+ 15' 03"
9	Roberto Visentini (ITA)	Carrera–Inoxpran	+ 15' 41"
10	Stephen Roche (IRL)	Carrera–Inoxpran	+ 15' 45"

== Stage 8 ==
6 July 1984 — Le Mans to Nantes, 192 km (119 mi)

Stage 8 result

Rank	Rider	Team	Time
1	Pascal Jules (FRA)	Renault–Elf	4h 18' 55"
2	Ludo Peeters (BEL)	Kwantum–Decosol–Yoko	+ 9"
3	Bruno Leali (ITA)	Carrera–Inoxpran	s.t.
4	Pedro Delgado (ESP)	Reynolds	+ 12"
5	Eric Vanderaerden (BEL)	Panasonic–Raleigh	+ 15"
6	Francis Castaing (FRA)	Peugeot–Shell–Michelin	s.t.
7	Frank Hoste (BEL)	Europ Decor–Boule d'Or–Eddy Merckx	s.t.
8	Jan Raas (NED)	Kwantum–Decosol–Yoko	s.t.
9	Sean Kelly (IRL)	Skil–Reydel–Sem	s.t.
10	Jean-François Rault (FRA)	La Vie Claire–Terraillon	s.t.

General classification after stage 8

Rank	Rider	Team	Time
1	Vincent Barteau (FRA)	Renault–Elf	29h 54' 58"
2	Maurice Le Guilloux (FRA)	La Vie Claire–Terraillon	+ 3' 07"
3	Paulo Ferreira (POR)	Sporting Lisboa–Raposeira	+ 9' 57"
4	Laurent Fignon (FRA)	Renault–Elf	+ 12' 42"
5	Phil Anderson (AUS)	Panasonic–Raleigh	+ 13' 40"
6	Bernard Hinault (FRA)	La Vie Claire–Terraillon	+ 14' 23"
7	Gerard Veldscholten (NED)	Panasonic–Raleigh	+ 14' 33"
8	Greg LeMond (USA)	Renault–Elf	+ 15' 03"
9	Ludo Peeters (BEL)	Kwantum–Decosol–Yoko	+ 15' 19"
10	Kim Andersen (DEN)	Coop–Hoonved–Rossin	+ 15' 39"

== Stage 9 ==
7 July 1984 — Nantes to Bordeaux, 338 km (210 mi)

Stage 9 result

Rank	Rider	Team	Time
1	Jan Raas (NED)	Kwantum–Decosol–Yoko	9h 40' 11"
2	Bruno Leali (ITA)	Carrera–Inoxpran	s.t.
3	Marc Madiot (FRA)	Renault–Elf	+ 3"
4	Sean Kelly (IRL)	Skil–Reydel–Sem	+ 5"
5	Eric Vanderaerden (BEL)	Panasonic–Raleigh	s.t.
6	Francis Castaing (FRA)	Peugeot–Shell–Michelin	s.t.
7	Noël Dejonckheere (BEL)	Teka	s.t.
8	Frank Hoste (BEL)	Europ Decor–Boule d'Or–Eddy Merckx	s.t.
9	Jean-Philippe Vandenbrande (BEL)	Mondial Moquette–Splendor	s.t.
10	Leo van Vliet (NED)	Kwantum–Decosol–Yoko	s.t.

General classification after stage 9

Rank	Rider	Team	Time
1	Vincent Barteau (FRA)	Renault–Elf	39h 35' 14"
2	Maurice Le Guilloux (FRA)	La Vie Claire–Terraillon	+ 3' 07"
3	Paulo Ferreira (POR)	Sporting Lisboa–Raposeira	+ 9' 57"
4	Laurent Fignon (FRA)	Renault–Elf	+ 12' 30"
5	Phil Anderson (AUS)	Panasonic–Raleigh	+ 13' 28"
6	Bernard Hinault (FRA)	La Vie Claire–Terraillon	+ 13' 43"
7	Gerard Veldscholten (NED)	Panasonic–Raleigh	+ 14' 33"
8	Greg LeMond (USA)	Renault–Elf	+ 15' 03"
9	Ludo Peeters (BEL)	Kwantum–Decosol–Yoko	+ 15' 19"
10	Kim Andersen (DEN)	Coop–Hoonved–Rossin	+ 15' 39"

== Stage 10 ==
8 July 1984 — Langon to Pau, 198 km (123 mi)

Stage 10 result

Rank	Rider	Team	Time
1	Eric Vanderaerden (BEL)	Panasonic–Raleigh	4h 51' 02"
2	Marc Dierickx (BEL)	Europ Decor–Boule d'Or–Eddy Merckx	s.t.
3	Sean Kelly (IRL)	Skil–Reydel–Sem	+ 2' 31"
4	Leo van Vliet (NED)	Kwantum–Decosol–Yoko	s.t.
5	Frank Hoste (BEL)	Europ Decor–Boule d'Or–Eddy Merckx	s.t.
6	Jean-François Rault (FRA)	La Vie Claire–Terraillon	s.t.
7	Francis Castaing (FRA)	Peugeot–Shell–Michelin	s.t.
8	Yvan Frebert (FRA)	Système U	s.t.
9	Ad Wijnands (NED)	Kwantum–Decosol–Yoko	s.t.
10	Jean-René Bernaudeau (FRA)	Système U	s.t.

General classification after stage 10

Rank	Rider	Team	Time
1	Vincent Barteau (FRA)	Renault–Elf	44h 28' 47"
2	Maurice Le Guilloux (FRA)	La Vie Claire–Terraillon	+ 3' 07"
3	Laurent Fignon (FRA)	Renault–Elf	+ 12' 30"
4	Paulo Ferreira (POR)	Sporting Lisboa–Raposeira	+ 13' 19"
5	Phil Anderson (AUS)	Panasonic–Raleigh	+ 13' 38"
6	Bernard Hinault (FRA)	La Vie Claire–Terraillon	+ 13' 43"
7	Gerard Veldscholten (NED)	Panasonic–Raleigh	+ 14' 33"
8	Greg LeMond (USA)	Renault–Elf	+ 15' 03"
9	Ludo Peeters (BEL)	Kwantum–Decosol–Yoko	+ 15' 19"
10	Sean Kelly (IRL)	Skil–Reydel–Sem	+ 15' 36"

== Stage 11 ==
9 July 1984 — Pau to Guzet-Neige, 226.5 km (140.7 mi)

Stage 11 result

Rank	Rider	Team	Time
1	Robert Millar (GBR)	Peugeot–Shell–Michelin	7h 03' 41"
2	Luis Herrera (COL)	Colombia–Varta	+ 41"
3	Pedro Delgado (ESP)	Reynolds	+ 1' 01"
4	Jean-René Bernaudeau (FRA)	Système U	+ 1' 47"
5	Gerard Veldscholten (NED)	Panasonic–Raleigh	+ 2' 05"
6	Ángel Arroyo (ESP)	Reynolds	+ 2' 13"
7	Laurent Fignon (FRA)	Renault–Elf	s.t.
8	Pierre Le Bigaut (FRA)	Coop–Hoonved–Rossin	+ 2' 49"
9	Alfonso Flórez Ortiz (COL)	Colombia–Varta	+ 3' 00"
10	Niki Rüttimann (SUI)	La Vie Claire–Terraillon	+ 3' 05"

General classification after stage 11

Rank	Rider	Team	Time
1	Vincent Barteau (FRA)	Renault–Elf	51h 36' 38"
2	Maurice Le Guilloux (FRA)	La Vie Claire–Terraillon	+ 7' 37"
3	Laurent Fignon (FRA)	Renault–Elf	+ 10' 33"
4	Gerard Veldscholten (NED)	Panasonic–Raleigh	+ 12' 28"
5	Bernard Hinault (FRA)	La Vie Claire–Terraillon	+ 12' 38"
6	Phil Anderson (AUS)	Panasonic–Raleigh	+ 13' 29"
7	Robert Millar (GBR)	Peugeot–Shell–Michelin	+ 14' 24"
8	Sean Kelly (IRL)	Skil–Reydel–Sem	+ 14' 31"
9	Greg LeMond (USA)	Renault–Elf	+ 14' 35"
10	Pedro Delgado (ESP)	Reynolds	+ 14' 37"
