= 1984 Tour de France =

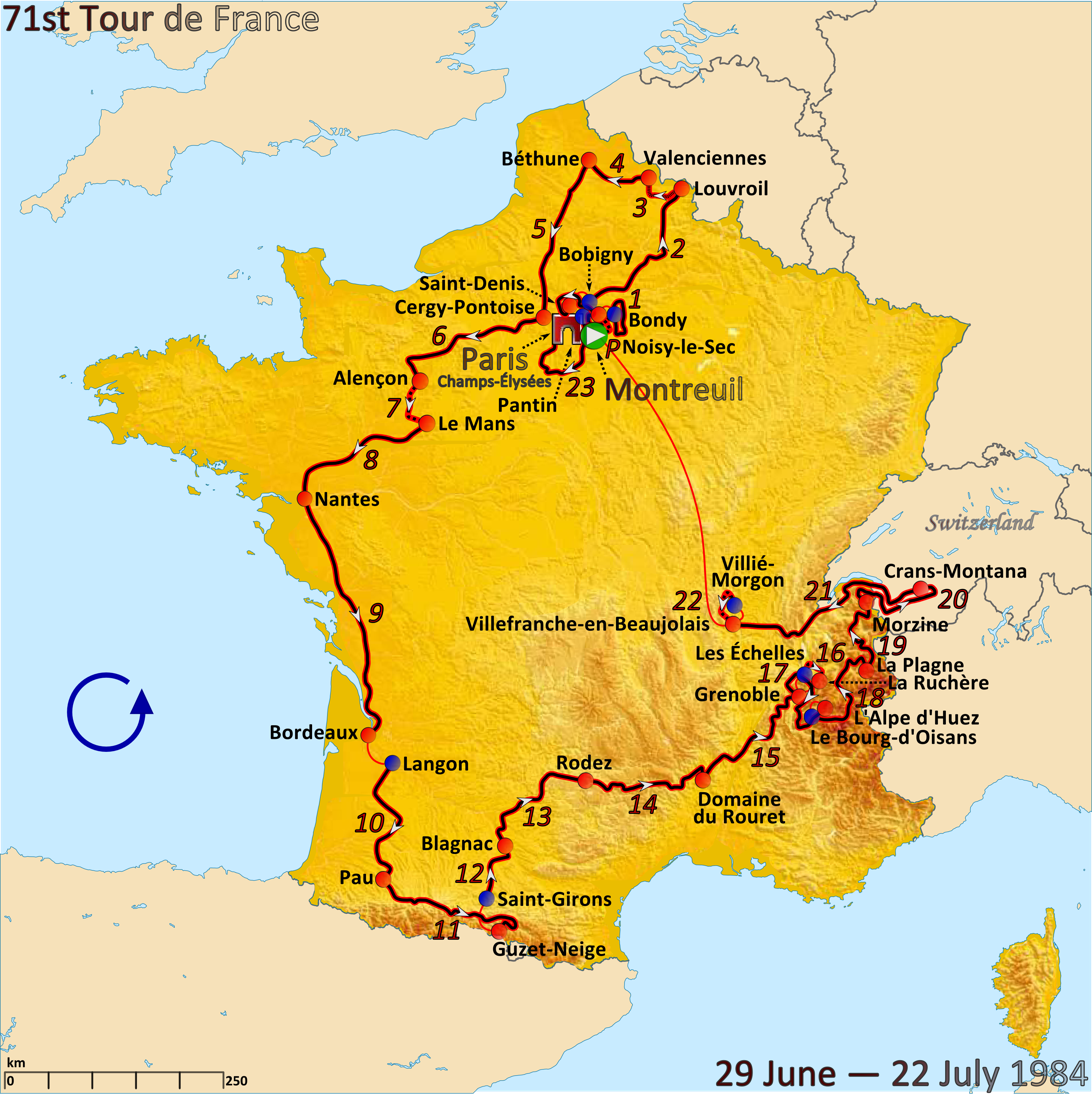
- Route of the 1984 Tour de France

Race details
- Dates: 29 June – 22 July 1984
- Stages: 23 + Prologue
- Distance: 4,021 km (2,499 mi)
- Winning time: 112h 03' 40"

Results
Jersey awarded to the overall winner	Winner	Laurent Fignon (FRA)	(Renault–Elf)
	Second	Bernard Hinault (FRA)	(La Vie Claire)
	Third	Greg LeMond (USA)	(Renault–Elf)
Jersey awarded to the points classification winner	Points	Frank Hoste (BEL)	(Europ Decor–Boule d'Or)
Jersey awarded to the mountains classification winner	Mountains	Robert Millar (GBR)	(Peugeot–Shell–Michelin)
Jersey awarded to the young rider classification winner	Young rider	Greg LeMond (USA)	(Renault–Elf)
	Combination	Laurent Fignon (FRA)	(Renault–Elf)
Jersey awarded to the sprints classification winner	Sprints	Jacques Hanegraaf (NED)	(Kwantum–Decosol–Yoko)
	Combativity	Bernard Hinault (FRA)	(La Vie Claire)
	Team	Renault–Elf	
	Team points	Panasonic–Raleigh	

The 1984 Tour de France was the 71st edition of the Tour de France, run over 4,021 km (2,499 mi) in 23 stages and a prologue, from 29 June to 22 July. The race was dominated by the Renault team, who won the team classification and ten stages: Renault's French rider Laurent Fignon won his second consecutive Tour, beating former teammate Bernard Hinault by over 10 minutes.

Hinault was pursuing his fifth Tour victory after having sat out the 1983 Tour because of injuries. Also that year, Fignon's team-mate Greg LeMond became the first American rider to finish in the top three and stand on the podium, and he also took the young rider classification. Belgian cyclist Frank Hoste won the points classification, and British Robert Millar won the mountains classification. The race consisted of 23 stages, totaling 4,020 kilometers (2,500 mi).

== Teams ==
There was room for 18 teams in the 1984 Tour de France; in early 1984, there were 17 candidate teams. Although the Tour organisation approached AVP–Viditel and Metauromobili, an 18th team was not added. The 1984 Tour started with 170 cyclists, divided into 17 teams of 10 cyclists. Of these, 42 were riding the Tour de France for the first time. The average age of riders in the race was 26.99 years, ranging from the 21-year-old Carlos Marta (Sporting–Raposeira) to the 37-year-old Joop Zoetemelk (Kwantum–Decosol–Yoko). The Renault–Elf cyclists had the youngest average age while the riders on Carrera–Inoxpran had the oldest.

The teams entering the race were:

- Renault–Elf
- Reynolds
- Panasonic–Raleigh
- La Redoute
- Système U
- Skil–Reydel–Sem–Mavic
- Peugeot–Shell–Michelin
- Sporting–Raposeira
- Teka
- Splendor–Mondial Moquettes–Marc
- COOP–Hoonved
- Cilo–Aufina–Crans–Montana
- Kwantum–Decosol–Yoko
- La Vie Claire
- Varta–Café de Colombia
- Europ Decor–Boule d'Or
- Carrera–Inoxpran

== Route and stages ==
The 1984 Tour de France started on 29 June, and had one rest day, in Grenoble. The highest point of elevation in the race was 2,642 m (8,668 ft) at the summit of the Col du Galibier mountain pass on stage 18.

Stage characteristics and winners
Stage	Date	Course	Distance	Type	Winner
P	29 June	Montreuil to Noisy-le-Sec	5 km (3.1 mi)	Individual time trial	Bernard Hinault (FRA)
1	30 June	Bondy to Saint-Denis	149 km (93 mi)	Plain stage	Frank Hoste (BEL)
2	1 July	Bobigny to Louvroil	249 km (155 mi)	Plain stage	Marc Madiot (FRA)
3	2 July	Louvroil to Valenciennes	51 km (32 mi)	Team time trial	(France) Renault–Elf
4	2 July	Valenciennes to Béthune	83 km (52 mi)	Plain stage	Ferdi Van Den Haute (BEL)
5	3 July	Béthune to Cergy-Pontoise	207 km (129 mi)	Plain stage	Paulo Ferreira (POR)
6	4 July	Cergy-Pontoise to Alençon	202 km (126 mi)	Plain stage	Frank Hoste (BEL)
7	5 July	Alençon to Le Mans	67 km (42 mi)	Individual time trial	Laurent Fignon (FRA)
8	6 July	Le Mans to Nantes	192 km (119 mi)	Plain stage	Pascal Jules (FRA)
9	7 July	Nantes to Bordeaux	338 km (210 mi)	Plain stage	Jan Raas (NED)
10	8 July	Langon to Pau	198 km (123 mi)	Plain stage	Eric Vanderaerden (BEL)
11	9 July	Pau to Guzet-Neige	227 km (141 mi)	Stage with mountain(s)	Robert Millar (GBR)
12	10 July	Saint-Girons to Blagnac	111 km (69 mi)	Plain stage	Pascal Poisson (FRA)
13	11 July	Blagnac to Rodez	220 km (140 mi)	Plain stage	Pierre-Henri Menthéour (FRA)
14	12 July	Rodez to Domaine du Rouret	228 km (142 mi)	Hilly stage	Fons De Wolf (BEL)
15	13 July	Domaine du Rouret to Grenoble	241 km (150 mi)	Hilly stage	Frédéric Vichot (FRA)
	14 July	Grenoble		Rest day	
16	15 July	Les Échelles to La Ruchère	22 km (14 mi)	Individual time trial	Laurent Fignon (FRA)
17	16 July	Grenoble to Alpe d'Huez	151 km (94 mi)	Stage with mountain(s)	Luis Herrera (COL)
18	17 July	Le Bourg-d'Oisans to La Plagne	185 km (115 mi)	Stage with mountain(s)	Laurent Fignon (FRA)
19	18 July	La Plagne to Morzine	186 km (116 mi)	Stage with mountain(s)	Ángel Arroyo (ESP)
20	19 July	Morzine to Crans-Montana (Switzerland)	141 km (88 mi)	Stage with mountain(s)	Laurent Fignon (FRA)
21	20 July	Crans-Montana (Switzerland) to Villefranche-sur-Saône	320 km (200 mi)	Hilly stage	Frank Hoste (BEL)
22	21 July	Villié-Morgon to Villefranche-sur-Saône	51 km (32 mi)	Individual time trial	Laurent Fignon (FRA)
23	22 July	Pantin to Paris (Champs-Élysées)	197 km (122 mi)	Hilly stage	Eric Vanderaerden (BEL)
	Total		4,021 km (2,499 mi)		

== Race overview ==
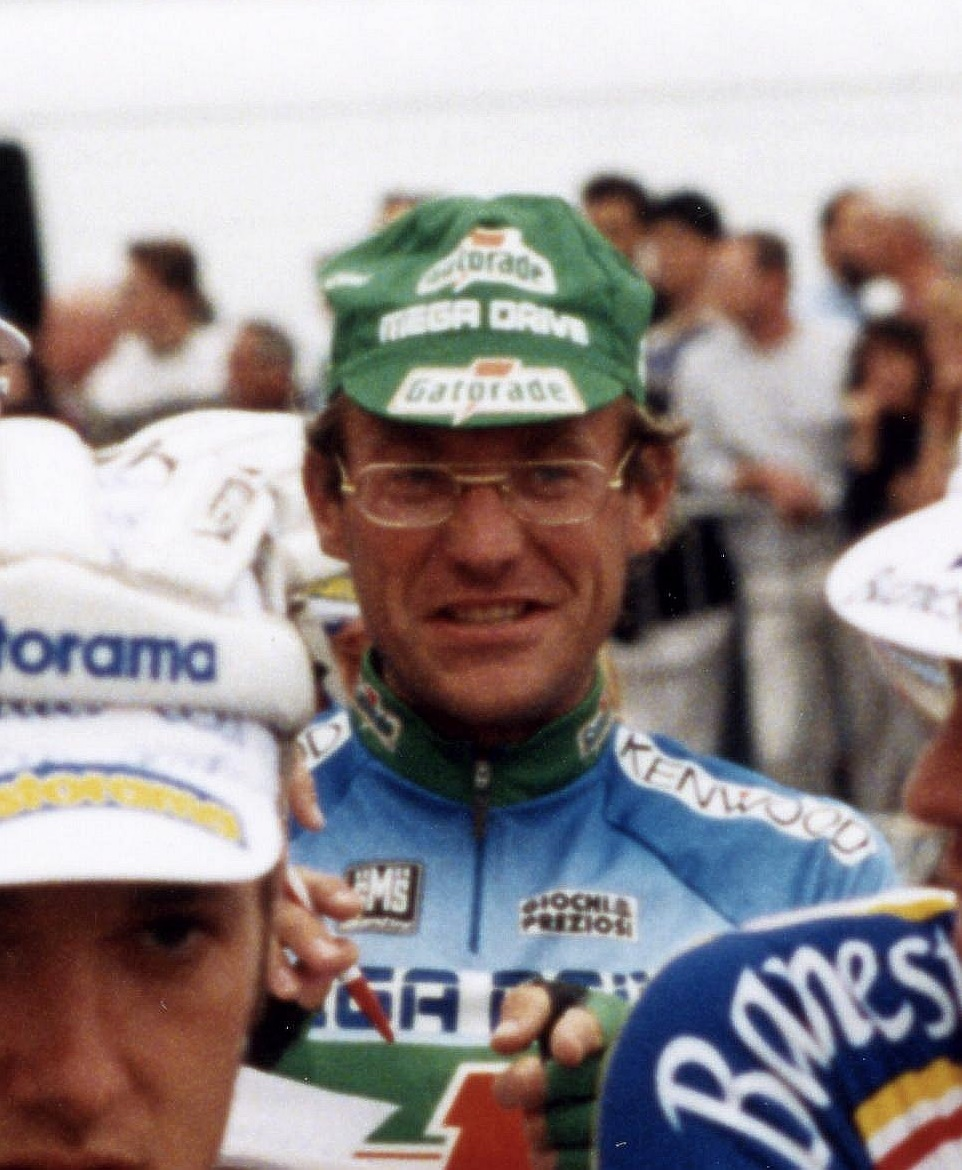
Laurent Fignon (pictured at the 1993 Tour), winner of the general classification

The 1984 Tour de France was a battle between reigning champion Fignon and his former team captain Hinault. Questions had been raised about the strength of Fignon's 1983 win due to Hinault's absence and Pascal Simon's withdrawal after breaking his shoulder whilst wearing the yellow jersey. Hinault won the prologue and the first two stages following the prologue were flat stages; the first of which was won by Frank Hoste in a bunch sprint with Ludo Peeters taking over as race leader. Tour organizers had made a purposeful effort to get riders from other countries outside of the traditional nations who usually make up the main field, and in stage two Ireland's Stephen Roche and Denmark's Kim Andersen both made the stage podium coming in just a few seconds behind stage winner Marc Madiot, as Jacques Hanegraaf claimed the yellow from Peeters going into the TTT in stage three. Over the previous five years or so the Team Time Trials would often be dominated by the Dutch TI–Raleigh squad, which was run by Peter Post as the Directeur Sportif, but there had been a rift between riders and some of them followed Post over to the new Panasonic–Raleigh while others joined Jan Raas and Joop Zoetemelk on the new Kwantum–Decosol–Yoko squad. Perhaps ironically in their first test competing against each other within the Tour de France the two teams tied for 2nd place at four seconds behind the Renault–Elf Team of Fignon and Greg LeMond. The Peugeot–Shell–Michelin Team of Robert Millar and Pascal Simon finished 4th and Hinault's new La Vie Claire team had a tough day coming in 7th place, leaving Hinault out of the top 10 overall following the stage. The overall lead was still held by Hanegraaf by a single second over Adri van der Poel with Fignon in the best position among the proven GC contenders in 6th place at +0:13, and his teammate and Tour debutant LeMond sitting in 5th place just ten seconds off the lead. Stage four finished in Béthune on the border of Belgium, and consequently thousands of Belgian fans descended upon the town for the finish. Ferdi Van Den Haute survived a solo attack of about sixty kilometers and upon entering the town he threw his arms up in celebration for all of the fans who were hoping to see a Belgian win, even though he still had five kilometers to go. He beat the peloton by over a minute to claim the stage win as Van Der Poel moved into yellow. In stage five a three rider breakaway made up of Paulo Ferreira, Maurice Le Guilloux and Vincent Barteau finished more than seventeen minutes ahead of the main field with Ferreira taking the stage victory and Barteau moving into the yellow jersey.

Stage six was a flat stage without a surviving breakaway meaning it was decided in a bunch finish, which was won by Hoste yet again, who this time edged out Eddy Planckaert and Gilbert Glaus at the finish line. Stage seven was an individual time trial which would provide a bit of clarity as to who the major contenders were going to be and it was won by Laurent Fignon. Two time Green Jersey winner Sean Kelly finished in 2nd while Hinault, who typically throughout his career dominated the ITT's, finished in 3rd place 0:49 slower than Fignon. Other potential contenders including Roche finished at +1:07, Gerard Veldscholten at +1:11, the Australian Phil Anderson at +1:24 and the very strong Italian rider who was often among the contenders for the Giro Roberto Visentini finished at +1:53 behind. The three breakaway riders from stage five still made up the top three but as far as the general classification was concerned, Fignon was the highest placed contender, with Anderson, Hinault, Veldscholten, LeMond, Visentini and Roche all within 3:00 of him. Stage eight was won by Pascal Jules who beat Ludo Peeters and Bruno Leali to the finish by nine seconds. Stage nine in this Tour was notable because it was 338 km long. This was the longest stage included in the race since the 1967 Tour de France and there has not been a stage longer than this since 1984. The last time a Tour stage was over 300 km was during the 1990 edition, the last time a stage was longer than 250 km was during the 2000 Tour and the last time a stage approached 250 km was in 2013 when there was a stage that was 243 km long which was not even a flat stage, but rather a stage that included Mont Ventoux. Stage 9 was won by Jan Raas and this would be the 10th and final stage win of his impressive career. The riders were on their bikes for nearly ten straight hours during this stage.

In stage ten Eric Vanderaerden beat Marc Dierickx in the sprint to take the stage win as the two of them escaped the peloton and beat it to the line by more than two minutes. More importantly in the overall standings the once seventeen minute gap held by Ferreira, Le Guilloux and Barteau was being considerably cut into and the race hadn't even reached the first set of high mountains in the Pyrenees, which began in stage eleven. In stage eleven Robert Millar won the first day in the mountains on a solo attack, with the Colombian climber Lucho Herrera coming in 2nd 0:41 behind him. Going into this stage Fignon held a gap of 1:13 over Hinault and by the end of the day it widened up to 2:05 as Fignon crossed the line in 7th place with Ángel Arroyo. The next two stages were both flat stages which were won by Pascal Poisson and Pierre-Henri Mentheour and then the race moved into south central France for two intermediate/hilly stages which were won by Fons de Wolf and Frederic Vichot. The stage win by De Wolf was rather astonishing in that it was a solo breakaway in which he beat the favorites to the line by nearly 18:00, actually jumped ahead of Hinault in the overall standings and came within 1:32 of Fignon. The energy exerted in this stage proved to be very costly however, as de Wolf lost considerable time the following day and faded back in with the Domestiques for the remainder of the Tour.

Going into the rest day Le Guilloux and Ferreira had long since fallen out of the top 10, however Vincent Barteau, perhaps inspired by the legend and mystique associated with the Maillot Jaune, did not want to let it go as he still held a lead of over ten minutes on the 2nd place Fignon, who was leading the way as far as the serious contenders were concerned. Hinault trailed him by 2:13, Veldscholten by 2:15, Anderson by 3:04 and the young American LeMond was thus far proving he could ride with the best of the best in the biggest race of them all being just 4:10 behind the defending champion. Stage sixteen was another individual time trial which was once again won by Fignon who cut the lead of Barteau down to 6:29 while simultaneously adding 0:33 to his lead over the four-time champion Hinault going into the Alps. Hinault made up his mind to strike during this first Alpine stage, which included the Alpe d'Huez and Côte de Laffrey and he attacked Fignon over and over again, but was not able to break the young Parisian. Lucho Herrera won the stage and Fignon crossed in 2nd after dropping the Badger and taking considerable time out of him. In fact, the American Lemond even finished the stage fourteen seconds faster than Hinault. Barteau finally came apart on this stage losing more than ten minutes to Fignon, who for the first time in the Tour, officially took over as race leader with Barteau falling to 2nd at +4:22, Hinault in 3rd at +5:41, Millar in 4th at +8:25 and LeMond in 5th at +8:45. In stage eighteen Fignon caught and dropped Jean-Marie Grezet, who put in a very gutsy performance, to take the stage win. LeMond had himself another remarkable performance in the mountains coming in three seconds behind Grezet and 1:07 behind Fignon as Hinault just couldn't find his legs in the mountains as he had done so many times before crossing the line in 9th place losing another 2:58 to Fignon. Stage nineteen was more of the mountains and this time Arroyo was able to ride off the front and claim the win, by 1:14 ahead of the group of favorites who all followed Sean Kelly across the line with the same time. Stage twenty was the last chance for riders to gain time in the mountains, but the only one who won time was the leader Fignon, who put his stamp of authority on the 1984 Tour by winning the stage eleven seconds ahead of Arroyo and seventeen seconds ahead of Pablo Wilches all while adding another 1:17 to his lead over Hinault.

With the heavy climbing finished Fignon had an all but insurmountable lead over Hinault of 9:56, and LeMond was only 1:13 behind Hinault. Stage twenty-one was back to the flatlands where the always gutsy, prideful and spirited Hinault decided to work his way to the front of the pack and bang elbows with the sprinters fighting it out for the stage win. Despite the fact the Tour was lost, yet Hinault continued charging on and fighting for stage wins, is part of the reason his popularity soared even higher than it already was with racing fans during the 1984 Tour. This time however, it was the sprinter Frank Hoste winning the day beating out Kelly, Hanegraaf and Hinault. During the final ITT in stage twenty-two Fignon and Sean Kelly finished with the same time, but the tiebreaker went to Fignon giving him the official win as he claimed enough time over Hinault to put his margin of victory over 10:00. LeMond finished in 4th place, and in the process secured both the final podium position, as well as his place as a legitimate GC contender proving he could compete with the best of the best during cycling's version of the Super Bowl. During the final stage in Paris, one of the most coveted sprinter's stages in the sport, Hoste, Kelly and the fiery Hinault once again made their way to the front of the pack during the final lap around the Champs-Élysées, but none of these riders would claim the coveted prize. Instead it was the Belgian rider Eric Vanderaerden (who along with Marc Demeyer, Freddy Maertens, Michel Pollentier, Johan De Muynck and Fons de Wolf was given the impossible to live up to task of following the legend Eddy Merckx) who won the day clinching his second stage win of the Tour, and one of the highlight wins of his entire career.

Greg LeMond took the young rider classification, Belgian cyclist Frank Hoste won the points classification, British Robert Millar won the mountains classification and Laurent Fignon would win a total of five stages as he won the Tour with a ten-minute margin. With his air of indifference in interviews and his crushing dominance, he was hailed as France's newest superstar. He even made the claim that some of the attacks Hinault made against him were laughable and that he easily caught back up to him, but this would be the second and final Tour de France win of Fignon's career. Hinault meanwhile, would sign LeMond to his La Vie Claire team in the offseason by visiting him at his home in the Sierra Nevadas, and win his fifth Tour the following year.

== Classification leadership and minor prizes ==
There were several classifications in the 1984 Tour de France, six of them awarding jerseys to their leaders. The most important was the general classification, calculated by adding each cyclist's finishing times on each stage. The cyclist with the least accumulated time was the race leader, identified by the yellow jersey; the winner of this classification is considered the winner of the Tour.

Additionally, there was a points classification, where cyclists were given points for finishing among the best in a stage finish, or in intermediate sprints. The cyclist with the most points lead the classification, and was identified with a green jersey.

There was also a mountains classification. The organisation had categorised some climbs as either hors catégorie, first, second, third, or fourth-category; points for this classification were won by the first cyclists that reached the top of these climbs first, with more points available for the higher-categorised climbs. The cyclist with the most points lead the classification, and wore a white jersey with red polka dots.

There was also a combination classification. This classification was calculated as a combination of the other classifications.

Another classification was the young rider classification. This was decided the same way as the general classification, but only riders that rode the Tour for the first time were eligible, and the leader wore a white jersey.

Before the 1984 Tour, the intermediate sprints classification did not have a jersey. In the 1984 Tour, the organisers gave the leader of the classification a red jersey to wear. This classification had similar rules as the points classification, but only points were awarded on intermediate sprints.

For the team classification, the times of the best three cyclists per team on each stage were added; the leading team was the team with the lowest total time. The riders in the team that led this classification were identified by yellow caps. There was also a team points classification. Cyclists received points according to their finishing position on each stage, with the first rider receiving one point. The first three finishers of each team had their points combined, and the team with the fewest points led the classification. The riders of the team leading this classification wore green caps.

In addition, there was a combativity award, in which a jury composed of journalists gave points after certain stages to the cyclist they considered most combative. The split stages each had a combined winner. At the conclusion of the Tour, Bernard Hinault won the overall super-combativity award, also decided by journalists. The Souvenir Henri Desgrange was given in honour of Tour founder Henri Desgrange to the first rider to pass the summit of the Col du Galibier on stage 18. This prize was won by Francisco Rodríguez Maldonado.

Classification leadership by stage
Stage	Stage winner	General classification	Points classification	Mountains classification	Young rider classification	Combination classification	Intermediate sprints classification	Team classifications		Combativity award
Stage	Stage winner	General classification	Points classification	Mountains classification	Young rider classification	Combination classification	Intermediate sprints classification	By time	By points	Combativity award
P	Bernard Hinault	Bernard Hinault	Bernard Hinault	not awarded	Allan Peiper	Bernard Hinault	not awarded	Renault–Elf	La Redoute	not awarded
1	Frank Hoste	Ludo Peeters	Frank Hoste	Ludo Peeters	Allan Peiper	Frank Hoste	Ludo Peeters	Renault–Elf	Peugeot–Shell–Michelin	Ludo Peeters
2	Marc Madiot	Jacques Hanegraaf	Jean-François Rault	Ludo Peeters	Jacques Hanegraaf	Adri van der Poel	Jacques Hanegraaf	Renault–Elf	Peugeot–Shell–Michelin	not awarded
3	Renault–Elf	Jacques Hanegraaf	Jean-François Rault	Ludo Peeters	Jacques Hanegraaf	Adri van der Poel	Jacques Hanegraaf	Renault–Elf	Peugeot–Shell–Michelin	not awarded
4	Ferdi Van Den Haute	Adri van der Poel	Jean-François Rault	Ludo Peeters	Jacques Hanegraaf	Adri van der Poel	Jacques Hanegraaf	Renault–Elf	Panasonic–Raleigh	Ferdi Van Den Haute
5	Paulo Ferreira	Vincent Barteau	Frank Hoste	Ludo Peeters	Vincent Barteau	Maurice Le Guilloux	Jacques Hanegraaf	Renault–Elf	Panasonic–Raleigh	Paulo Ferreira
6	Frank Hoste	Vincent Barteau	Frank Hoste	Ludo Peeters	Vincent Barteau	Maurice Le Guilloux	Phil Anderson	Renault–Elf	Panasonic–Raleigh	not awarded
7	Laurent Fignon	Vincent Barteau	Frank Hoste	Ludo Peeters	Vincent Barteau	Maurice Le Guilloux	Phil Anderson	Renault–Elf	Panasonic–Raleigh	not awarded
8	Pascal Jules	Vincent Barteau	Frank Hoste	Ludo Peeters	Vincent Barteau	Maurice Le Guilloux	Phil Anderson	Renault–Elf	Panasonic–Raleigh	Alain Bondue
9	Jan Raas	Vincent Barteau	Frank Hoste	Ludo Peeters	Vincent Barteau	Maurice Le Guilloux	Jacques Hanegraaf	Renault–Elf	Panasonic–Raleigh	Régis Clère
10	Eric Vanderaerden	Vincent Barteau	Frank Hoste	Ludo Peeters	Vincent Barteau	Maurice Le Guilloux	Jacques Hanegraaf	Renault–Elf	Panasonic–Raleigh	Theo de Rooij
11	Robert Millar	Vincent Barteau	Frank Hoste	Jean-René Bernaudeau	Vincent Barteau	Vincent Barteau	Jacques Hanegraaf	Renault–Elf	Panasonic–Raleigh	Jean-René Bernaudeau
12	Pascal Poisson	Vincent Barteau	Frank Hoste	Jean-René Bernaudeau	Vincent Barteau	Vincent Barteau	Jacques Hanegraaf	Renault–Elf	Panasonic–Raleigh	Bernard Hinault
13	Pierre-Henri Menthéour	Vincent Barteau	Frank Hoste	Jean-René Bernaudeau	Vincent Barteau	Vincent Barteau	Jacques Hanegraaf	Renault–Elf	Panasonic–Raleigh	Dominique Garde
14	Alfons De Wolf	Vincent Barteau	Frank Hoste	Jean-René Bernaudeau	Vincent Barteau	Vincent Barteau	Jacques Hanegraaf	Renault–Elf	Panasonic–Raleigh	Alfons De Wolf
15	Frédéric Vichot	Vincent Barteau	Frank Hoste	Jean-René Bernaudeau	Vincent Barteau	Vincent Barteau	Jacques Hanegraaf	Renault–Elf	Panasonic–Raleigh	Michel Laurent
16	Laurent Fignon	Vincent Barteau	Frank Hoste	Jean-René Bernaudeau	Vincent Barteau	Vincent Barteau	Jacques Hanegraaf	Renault–Elf	Panasonic–Raleigh	not awarded
17	Luis Herrera	Laurent Fignon	Frank Hoste	Robert Millar	Vincent Barteau	Robert Millar	Jacques Hanegraaf	Renault–Elf	Panasonic–Raleigh	Bernard Hinault
18	Laurent Fignon	Laurent Fignon	Frank Hoste	Robert Millar	Greg LeMond	Laurent Fignon	Jacques Hanegraaf	Renault–Elf	Panasonic–Raleigh	Francisco Rodríguez Maldonado
19	Ángel Arroyo	Laurent Fignon	Frank Hoste	Robert Millar	Greg LeMond	Laurent Fignon	Jacques Hanegraaf	Renault–Elf	Panasonic–Raleigh	Jérôme Simon
20	Laurent Fignon	Laurent Fignon	Frank Hoste	Robert Millar	Greg LeMond	Laurent Fignon	Jacques Hanegraaf	Renault–Elf	Panasonic–Raleigh	Henk Lubberding
21	Frank Hoste	Laurent Fignon	Frank Hoste	Robert Millar	Greg LeMond	Laurent Fignon	Jacques Hanegraaf	Renault–Elf	Panasonic–Raleigh	
22	Laurent Fignon	Laurent Fignon	Sean Kelly	Robert Millar	Greg LeMond	Laurent Fignon	Jacques Hanegraaf	Renault–Elf	Panasonic–Raleigh	not awarded
23	Eric Vanderaerden	Laurent Fignon	Frank Hoste	Robert Millar	Greg LeMond	Laurent Fignon	Jacques Hanegraaf	Renault–Elf	Panasonic–Raleigh	
Final		Laurent Fignon	Frank Hoste	Robert Millar	Greg LeMond	Laurent Fignon	Jacques Hanegraaf	Renault–Elf	Panasonic–Raleigh	Bernard Hinault

- In stage 1, Laurent Fignon wore the green jersey, because Bernard Hinault already wore the yellow jersey.
- In stage 2, Harald Maier wore the polka dot jersey, because Ludo Peeters already wore the yellow jersey.
- In stage 4, Allan Peiper wore the white jersey, because Jacques Hanegraaf already wore the yellow jersey.
- In stages 6 – 11, Paulo Ferreira wore the white jersey, because Vincent Barteau already wore the yellow jersey.
- In stages 12 – 17, Greg LeMond wore the white jersey, because Vincent Barteau already wore the yellow jersey.

== Final standings ==
Legend
A yellow jersey.	Denotes the winner of the general classification	A green jersey.	Denotes the winner of the points classification
A white jersey with red polka dots.	Denotes the winner of the mountains classification	A white jersey.	Denotes the winner of the young rider classification
A red jersey.	Denotes the winner of the intermediate sprints classification		

=== General classification ===
Final general classification (1–10)
Rank	Rider	Team	Time
1	Laurent Fignon (FRA)	Renault–Elf	112h 03' 40"
2	Bernard Hinault (FRA)	La Vie Claire	+ 10' 32"
3	Greg LeMond (USA)	Renault–Elf	+ 11' 46"
4	Robert Millar (GBR)	Peugeot–Shell–Michelin	+ 14' 42"
5	Sean Kelly (IRE)	Skil–Reydel–Sem–Mavic	+ 16' 35"
6	Ángel Arroyo (ESP)	Reynolds	+ 19' 22"
7	Pascal Simon (FRA)	Peugeot–Shell–Michelin	+ 21' 17"
8	Pedro Muñoz Machín Rodríguez (ESP)	Teka	+ 26' 17"
9	Claude Criquielion (BEL)	Splendor–Mondial Moquettes–Marc	+ 29' 12"
10	Phil Anderson (AUS)	Panasonic–Raleigh	+ 29' 16"

Final general classification (11–124)
Rank	Rider	Team	Time
11	Niki Rüttimann (SUI)	La Vie Claire	+ 30' 58"
12	Rafaël Antonio Acevedo (COL)	Varta–Café de Colombia	+ 33' 32"
13	Jean-Marie Grezet (SUI)	Skil–Reydel–Sem–Mavic	+ 33' 41"
14	Éric Caritoux (FRA)	Skil–Reydel–Sem–Mavic	+ 36' 28"
15	José Patrocinio Jiménez (COL)	Teka	+ 37' 49"
16	Gerard Veldscholten (NED)	Panasonic–Raleigh	+ 41' 54"
17	Michel Laurent (FRA)	COOP–Hoonved	+ 44' 33"
18	Alfonso Florez (COL)	Varta–Café de Colombia	+ 45' 33"
19	José Antonio Agudelo Gómez (COL)	Varta–Café de Colombia	+ 49' 25"
20	Bernard Gavillet (SUI)	Cilo–Aufina–Crans–Montana	+ 51' 02"
21	Pascal Jules (FRA)	Renault–Elf	+ 51' 53"
22	Luciano Loro (ITA)	Carrera–Inoxpran	+ 52' 37"
23	Frédéric Vichot (FRA)	Skil–Reydel–Sem–Mavic	+ 53' 18"
24	Guy Nulens (BEL)	Panasonic–Raleigh	+ 53' 25"
25	Stephen Roche (IRE)	La Redoute	+ 56' 36"
26	Peter Winnen (NED)	Panasonic–Raleigh	+ 58' 14"
27	Luis Herrera (COL)	Varta–Café de Colombia	+ 58' 30"
28	Vincent Barteau (FRA)	Renault–Elf	+ 1h 00' 02"
29	Gilles Mas (FRA)	Skil–Reydel–Sem–Mavic	+ 1h 05' 38"
30	Joop Zoetemelk (NED)	Kwantum–Decosol–Yoko	+ 1h 06' 02"
31	Jonathan Boyer (USA)	Skil–Reydel–Sem–Mavic	+ 1h 07' 03"
32	Samuel Cabrera (COL)	Varta–Café de Colombia	+ 1h 07' 17"
33	Dominique Garde (FRA)	Peugeot–Shell–Michelin	+ 1h 09' 58"
34	Celestino Prieto (ESP)	Reynolds	+ 1h 10' 23"
35	Marc Madiot (FRA)	Renault–Elf	+ 1h 13' 03"
36	Jérôme Simon (FRA)	La Redoute	+ 1h 16' 33"
37	Marc Durant (FRA)	Système U	+ 1h 17' 22"
38	Robert Alban (FRA)	La Redoute	+ 1h 18' 03"
39	Federico Echave (ESP)	Teka	+ 1h 22' 59"
40	Henk Lubberding (NED)	Panasonic–Raleigh	+ 1h 23' 52"
41	José Luis Laguía (ESP)	Reynolds	+ 1h 24' 02"
42	Jean-Philippe Vandenbrande (BEL)	Splendor–Mondial Moquettes–Marc	+ 1h 24' 13"
43	Beat Breu (SUI)	Cilo–Aufina–Crans–Montana	+ 1h 25' 21"
44	Pierre Le Bigaut (FRA)	COOP–Hoonved	+ 1h 26' 51"
45	Francisco Rodríguez (COL)	Splendor–Mondial Moquettes–Marc	+ 1h 28' 35"
46	Yvon Madiot (FRA)	Renault–Elf	+ 1h 29' 39"
47	Alain Vigneron (FRA)	La Vie Claire	+ 1h 29' 49"
48	Marc Sergeant (BEL)	Europ Decor–Boule d'Or	+ 1h 31' 13"
49	Charly Berard (FRA)	La Vie Claire	+ 1h 33' 15"
50	Kim Andersen (DEN)	COOP–Hoonved	+ 1h 33' 23"
51	Enrique Aja (ESP)	Reynolds	+ 1h 33' 53"
52	Julián Gorospe (ESP)	Reynolds	+ 1h 37' 23"
53	Carlos Hernández (ESP)	Reynolds	+ 1h 37' 30"
54	Dominique Arnaud (FRA)	La Vie Claire	+ 1h 37' 50"
55	Pierre-Henri Menthéour (FRA)	Renault–Elf	+ 1h 38' 51"
56	Hennie Kuiper (NED)	Kwantum–Decosol–Yoko	+ 1h 39' 30"
57	Ludo Peeters (BEL)	Kwantum–Decosol–Yoko	+ 1h 39' 59"
58	Urs Zimmermann (SUI)	Cilo–Aufina–Crans–Montana	+ 1h 40' 39"
59	Theo de Rooij (NED)	Panasonic–Raleigh	+ 1h 42' 20"
60	Herman Loaiza (COL)	Varta–Café de Colombia	+ 1h 43' 55"
61	Antonio Ferretti (SUI)	Cilo–Aufina–Crans–Montana	+ 1h 47' 24"
62	Maurice Le Guilloux (FRA)	La Vie Claire	+ 1h 48' 38"
63	Guy Gallopin (FRA)	Skil–Reydel–Sem–Mavic	+ 1h 49' 07"
64	Raimund Dietzen (FRG)	Teka	+ 1h 49' 31"
65	Alfonso Lopez (COL)	Varta–Café de Colombia	+ 1h 49' 59"
66	Antonio Coll (ESP)	Teka	+ 1h 52' 04"
67	André Chappuis (FRA)	Système U	+ 1h 52' 04"
68	René Martens (BEL)	Teka	+ 1h 52' 25"
69	Yvan Frebert (FRA)	Système U	+ 1h 53' 58"
70	Glauco Santoni (ITA)	Carrera–Inoxpran	+ 1h 54' 28"
71	Jesús Hernández Úbeda (ESP)	Reynolds	+ 1h 55' 17"
72	Lucien Didier (LUX)	Renault–Elf	+ 1h 56' 39"
73	Bernard Vallet (FRA)	La Vie Claire	+ 1h 58' 23"
74	Alfons De Wolf (BEL)	Europ Decor–Boule d'Or	+ 1h 58' 36"
75	Leo van Vliet (NED)	Kwantum–Decosol–Yoko	+ 1h 58' 52"
76	Bruno Leali (ITA)	Carrera–Inoxpran	+ 2h 03' 40"
77	Marco Antonio Chagas (POR)	Sporting–Raposeira	+ 2h 08' 15"
78	Israel Corredor (COL)	Varta–Café de Colombia	+ 2h 09' 31"
79	Patrick Clerc (FRA)	Skil–Reydel–Sem–Mavic	+ 2h 11' 29"
80	Pascal Poisson (FRA)	Renault–Elf	+ 2h 11' 37"
81	Giancarlo Perini (ITA)	Carrera–Inoxpran	+ 2h 12' 08"
82	Jean-François Rault (FRA)	La Vie Claire	+ 2h 12' 17"
83	Alain Dithurbide (FRA)	Sporting–Raposeira	+ 2h 13' 02"
84	Erich Mächler (SUI)	Cilo–Aufina–Crans–Montana	+ 2h 15' 23"
85	Patrick Bonnet (FRA)	Système U	+ 2h 17' 18"
86	Bernard Bourreau (FRA)	Peugeot–Shell–Michelin	+ 2h 20' 29"
87	Anastasio Greciano (ESP)	Reynolds	+ 2h 20' 51"
88	Hendrik Devos (BEL)	Splendor–Mondial Moquettes–Marc	+ 2h 23' 55"
89	Frédéric Brun (FRA)	Peugeot–Shell–Michelin	+ 2h 25' 08"
90	Eric Vanderaerden (BEL)	Panasonic–Raleigh	+ 2h 26' 14"
91	Sean Yates (GBR)	Peugeot–Shell–Michelin	+ 2h 26' 41"
92	Ludo De Keulenaer (BEL)	Panasonic–Raleigh	+ 2h 28' 49"
93	Czeslaw Lang (POL)	Carrera–Inoxpran	+ 2h 29' 21"
94	Manuel Zeferino (POR)	Sporting–Raposeira	+ 2h 29' 26"
95	Allan Peiper (AUS)	Peugeot–Shell–Michelin	+ 2h 31' 28"
96	Patrick Moerlen (SUI)	Skil–Reydel–Sem–Mavic	+ 2h 31' 33"
97	Jean-Louis Gauthier (FRA)	COOP–Hoonved	+ 2h 34' 10"
98	Bernardo Alfonsel (ESP)	Teka	+ 2h 35' 25"
99	Alain Bondue (FRA)	La Redoute	+ 2h 36' 45"
100	Frank Hoste (BEL)	Europ Decor–Boule d'Or	+ 2h 38' 08"
101	Jacques Hanegraaf (NED)	Kwantum–Decosol–Yoko	+ 2h 44' 04"
102	Jacques Bossis (FRA)	Peugeot–Shell–Michelin	+ 2h 44' 26"
103	Gerrie Knetemann (NED)	Europ Decor–Boule d'Or	+ 2h 47' 58"
104	Marc Dierickx (BEL)	Europ Decor–Boule d'Or	+ 2h 49' 20"
105	Francis Castaing (FRA)	Peugeot–Shell–Michelin	+ 2h 51' 59"
106	Ferdi Van Den Haute (BEL)	La Redoute	+ 2h 52' 48"
107	Henri Manders (NED)	Kwantum–Decosol–Yoko	+ 2h 59' 01"
108	Ad Wijnands (NED)	Kwantum–Decosol–Yoko	+ 3h 01' 04"
109	Luc Govaerts (BEL)	Europ Decor–Boule d'Or	+ 3h 01' 39"
110	Christian Levavasseur (FRA)	La Redoute	+ 3h 03' 04"
111	Régis Simon (FRA)	La Redoute	+ 3h 04' 25"
112	Hubert Linard (FRA)	Peugeot–Shell–Michelin	+ 3h 06' 24"
113	Valerio Lualdi (ITA)	Carrera–Inoxpran	+ 3h 06' 50"
114	Claude Moreau (FRA)	COOP–Hoonved	+ 3h 07' 34"
115	Patrice Thevenard (FRA)	Sporting–Raposeira	+ 3h 09' 16"
116	Paul Sherwen (GBR)	La Redoute	+ 3h 24' 48"
117	Michel Charreard (FRA)	Sporting–Raposeira	+ 3h 25' 18"
118	Eduardo Manuel Correia (POR)	Sporting–Raposeira	+ 3h 25' 37"
119	José Antonio Xavier (POR)	Sporting–Raposeira	+ 3h 27' 26"
120	Modesto Urrutibeazcoa (ESP)	Teka	+ 3h 30' 11"
121	Dominique Gaigne (FRA)	Renault–Elf	+ 3h 35' 39"
122	Carlos Alberto Marta (POR)	Sporting–Raposeira	+ 3h 40' 05"
123	Marcel Russenberger (SUI)	Cilo–Aufina–Crans–Montana	+ 4h 00' 30"
124	Gilbert Glaus (SUI)	Cilo–Aufina–Crans–Montana	+ 4h 01' 17"

=== Points classification ===
Final points classification (1–10)
Rank	Rider	Team	Points
1	Frank Hoste (BEL)	Europ Decor–Boule d'Or	322
2	Sean Kelly (IRE)	Skil–Reydel–Sem–Mavic	318
3	Eric Vanderaerden (BEL)	Panasonic–Raleigh	247
4	Leo van Vliet (NED)	Kwantum–Decosol–Yoko	173
5	Bernard Hinault (FRA)	La Vie Claire	146
6	Laurent Fignon (FRA)	Renault–Elf	143
7	Francis Castaing (FRA)	Peugeot–Shell–Michelin	137
8	Pascal Jules (FRA)	Renault–Elf	123
9	Jean-François Rault (FRA)	La Vie Claire	83
10	Jean-Philippe Vandenbrande (BEL)	Splendor–Mondial Moquettes–Marc	80

=== Mountains classification ===
Final mountains classification (1–10)
Rank	Rider	Team	Points
1	Robert Millar (GBR)	Peugeot–Shell–Michelin	284
2	Laurent Fignon (FRA)	Renault–Elf	212
3	Ángel Arroyo (ESP)	Reynolds	140
4	Luis Herrera (COL)	Varta–Café de Colombia	108
5	José Patrocinio Jiménez (COL)	Teka	92
6	Bernard Hinault (FRA)	La Vie Claire	89
7	Pascal Simon (FRA)	Peugeot–Shell–Michelin	79
8	Theo de Rooij (NED)	Panasonic–Raleigh	74
9	Greg LeMond (USA)	Renault–Elf	69
10	Sean Kelly (IRE)	Skil–Reydel–Sem–Mavic	65

=== Young rider classification ===
Final young rider classification (1–10)
Rank	Rider	Team	Time
1	Greg LeMond (USA)	Renault–Elf	112h 15' 26"
2	Pedro Muñoz Machín Rodríguez (ESP)	Teka	+ 14' 31"
3	Niki Rüttimann (SUI)	La Vie Claire	+ 19' 12"
4	Rafael Acevedo (COL)	Varta–Café de Colombia	+ 21' 46"
5	José Antonio Agudelo Gómez (COL)	Varta–Café de Colombia	+ 37' 39"
6	Frédéric Vichot (FRA)	Skil–Reydel–Sem–Mavic	+ 41' 32"
7	Luis Herrera (COL)	Varta–Café de Colombia	+ 46' 44"
8	Vincent Barteau (FRA)	Renault–Elf	+ 48' 16"
9	Gilles Mas (FRA)	Skil–Reydel–Sem–Mavic	+ 53' 52"
10	Jérôme Simon (FRA)	La Redoute	+ 1h 04' 47"

=== Intermediate sprints classification ===
Final intermediate sprints classification (1–10)
Rank	Rider	Team	Points
1	Jacques Hanegraaf (NED)	Kwantum–Decosol–Yoko	155
2	Bernard Hinault (FRA)	La Vie Claire	52
3	Laurent Fignon (FRA)	Renault–Elf	51
4	Phil Anderson (AUS)	Panasonic–Raleigh	47
5	Sean Kelly (IRE)	Skil–Reydel–Sem–Mavic	47
6	Alain Bondue (FRA)	La Redoute	42
7	Alfons De Wolf (BEL)	Europ Decor–Boule d'Or	37
8	Pascal Jules (FRA)	Renault–Elf	34
9	Dominique Garde (FRA)	Peugeot–Shell–Michelin	34
10	Ludo Peeters (BEL)	Kwantum–Decosol–Yoko	32

=== Team classification ===
Final team classification (1–10)
Rank	Team	Time
1	Renault–Elf	336h 31' 16"
2	Skil–Reydel–Sem–Mavic	+ 46' 44"
3	Reynolds	+ 57' 58"
4	Peugeot–Shell–Michelin	+ 1h 01' 57"
5	La Vie Claire	+ 1h 15' 59"
6	Varta–Café de Colombia	+ 1h 25' 02"
7	Panasonic–Raleigh	+ 1h 31' 09"
8	Teka	+ 1h 39' 47"
9	Splendor–Mondial Moquettes–Marc	+ 2h 21' 37"
10	Cilo–Aufina–Crans–Montana	+ 2h 50' 56"

=== Team points classification ===
Final team points classification (1–10)
Rank	Team	Points
1	Panasonic–Raleigh	1159
2	Renault–Elf	1318
3	Peugeot–Shell–Michelin	1322
4	Skil–Reydel–Sem–Mavic	1371
5	La Vie Claire	1506
6	Kwantum–Decosol–Yoko	2048
7	Reynolds	2136
8	Splendor–Mondial Moquettes–Marc	2162
9	COOP–Hoonved	2224
10	Teka	2433

== Bibliography ==
- Augendre, Jacques (2016). Guide historique [Historical guide] (PDF) (in French). Paris: Amaury Sport Organisation. Archived (PDF) from the original on 17 August 2016.
- Martin, Pierre (1984). Tour 84: The Stories of the 1984 Tour of Italy and Tour de France. With contributions from: Penazzo, Sergio; Baratino, Dante; Schamps, Daniel; Vos, Cor. Keighley, UK: Kennedy Brothers Publishing. OCLC 39314185.
- McGann, Bill; McGann, Carol (2008). The Story of the Tour de France: 1965–2007. Vol. 2. Indianapolis: Dog Ear Publishing. ISBN 978-1-59858-608-4.
- Nauright, John; Parrish, Charles (2012). Sports Around the World: History, Culture, and Practice. Vol. 2. Santa Barbara, California: ABC-CLIO. ISBN 978-1-59884-300-2.
- van den Akker, Pieter (2018). Tour de France Rules and Statistics: 1903–2018. Self-published. ISBN 978-1-79398-080-9.
