= 1984 Tour de Suisse =

Race details
- Dates: 13–22 June 1984
- Stages: 9 + Prologue
- Distance: 1,626.5 km (1,011 mi)
- Winning time: 43h 18' 43"

Results
	Winner	Urs Zimmermann (SUI)	(Cilo–Aufina–Crans–Montana)
	Second	Acácio da Silva (POR)	(Malvor–Bottecchia)
	Third	Gerhard Zadrobilek (AUT)	(Atala)
	Points	Sean Kelly (IRL)	(Skil–Reydel–Sem–Mavic)
	Mountains	Acácio da Silva (POR)	(Malvor–Bottecchia)
	Combination	Sean Kelly (IRL)	(Skil–Reydel–Sem–Mavic)
	Team	Panasonic–Raleigh	

The 1984 Tour de Suisse was the 48th edition of the Tour de Suisse cycle race and was held from 13 June to 22 June 1984. The race started in Urdorf and finished in Zürich. The race was won by Urs Zimmermann of the Cilo–Aufina team.

== General classification ==
Final general classification

Rank	Rider	Team	Time
1	Urs Zimmermann (SUI)	Cilo–Aufina–Crans–Montana	43h 18' 43"
2	Acácio da Silva (POR)	Malvor–Bottecchia	+ 2' 18"
3	Gerhard Zadrobilek (AUT)	Atala	+ 2' 42"
4	Sean Kelly (IRL)	Skil–Reydel–Sem–Mavic	+ 5' 47"
5	Phil Anderson (AUS)	Panasonic–Raleigh	+ 5' 56"
6	Beat Breu (SUI)	Cilo–Aufina–Crans–Montana	+ 6' 03"
7	Harald Maier (AUT)	Europ Decor–Boule d'Or	+ 8' 30"
8	Leo Wellens (BEL)	Dries–Verandalux	+ 8' 37"
9	Gerard Veldscholten (NED)	Panasonic–Raleigh	+ 13' 14"
10	Claudio Savini (SUI)	Dromedario-Alan	+ 15' 27"
