= Carlos Marta =

Portuguese cyclist

Personal information
- Born: 31 March 1963 (age 63)

Cycling career
- Sport: Cycling
- Role: Rider

Carlos Marta (born 31 March 1963) is a Portuguese racing cyclist. He rode in the 1984 Tour de France.
