= 1985 Giro del Trentino =

Race details
- Dates: 7–9 May 1985
- Stages: 3
- Distance: 598 km (371.6 mi)
- Winning time: 17h 07' 27"

Results
	Winner	Harald Maier (AUT)
	Second	Silvano Contini (ITA)
	Third	Gerhard Zadrobilek (AUT)

The 1985 Giro del Trentino was the ninth edition of the Tour of the Alps cycle race and was held on 7 May to 9 May 1985. The race started in Riva del Garda and finished in Arco. The race was won by Harald Maier.

== General classification ==
Final general classification

Rank	Rider	Time
1	Harald Maier (AUT)	17h 07' 27"
2	Silvano Contini (ITA)	+ 0"
3	Gerhard Zadrobilek (AUT)	+ 0"
4	Ennio Salvador (ITA)	+ 7"
5	Francesco Moser (ITA)	+ 12"
6	Marino Amadori (ITA)	+ 17"
7	Romano Randi (ITA)	+ 17"
8	Marco Giovannetti (ITA)	+ 17"
9	Franco Chioccioli (ITA)	+ 19"
10	Guido Bontempi (ITA)	+ 54"
