= Harald Maier =

Austrian cyclist

Personal information
- Born: 17 November 1960 (age 65) Steiermark, Austria

Cycling career
- Sport: Cycling
- Current team: Retired
- Discipline: Road
- Role: Rider

Professional teams
- 1982–1983: Puch–Eorotex–Campagnolo
- 1984: Europ Decor–Boule d'Or
- 1985: Gis Gelati
- 1986: Supermercati Brianzoli
- 1987: Paini–Bottecchia–Sidi
- 1988: GIS–Ecoflam–Jolly
- 1990–1992: PDM–Concorde–Ultima
- 1993–1994: Festina–Lotus

Major wins
- Stage races Giro del Trentino (1985)

Harald Maier (born 17 November 1960) is an Austrian former professional racing cyclist. He rode in three editions of the Tour de France, one edition of the Giro d'Italia and two editions of the Vuelta a España. He was the overall winner of the 1985 Giro del Trentino.

== Major results ==
1983
3rd Vuelta Camp de Morvedre
4th Grand Prix Cerami
1984
7th Overall Tour de Suisse
7th Overall Vuelta a Aragon
1985
1st Overall Giro del Trentino

1st Stage 1

5th Road race, UCI Road World Championships
1986
1st GP Industria & Commercio di Prato
3rd Overall Tour de Luxembourg
3rd Giro del Friuli
10th Overall Giro di Puglia
1990
2nd Straßenengler Radsporttag
1991
2nd Straßenengler Radsporttag
6th Overall Vuelta a los Valles Mineros

1st Stage 4

1992
1st Stage 1 Tour of the Basque Country
1993
6th Giro dell'Emilia
10th Overall Volta a Catalunya
10th Trofeo Masferrer
