= Lemselo =

- Hamlet
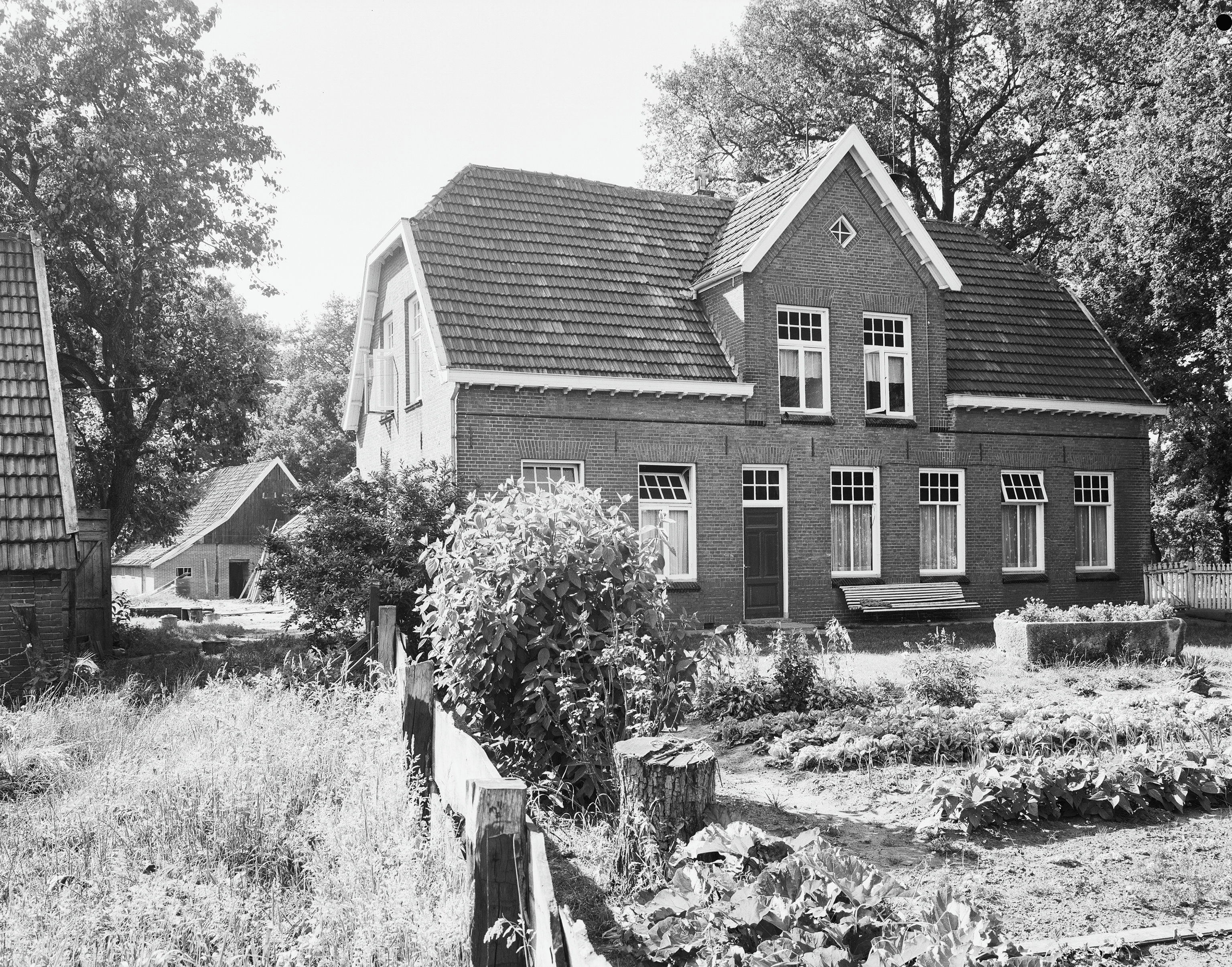
- Farm in Lemselo
- Nickname: Heuimiegers
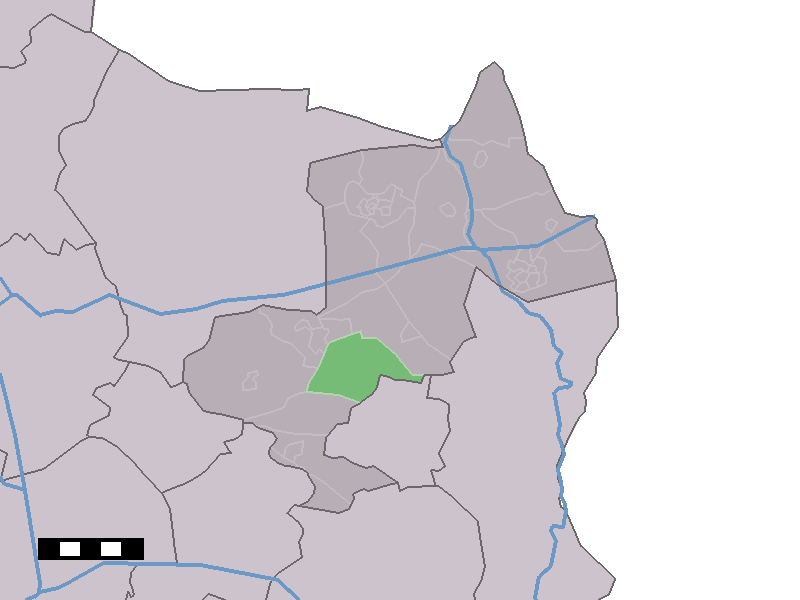
- Lemselo in the municipality of Dinkelland.

- Location in the Netherlands Lemselo (Netherlands)
- Coordinates: 52°20′11″N 6°53′44″E
- Country: Netherlands
- Province: Overijssel
- Municipality: Dinkelland
- Elevation: 17 m (56 ft)
- Demonym: Lemseloërs
- Time zone: UTC+1 (CET)
  - Summer (DST): UTC+2 (CEST)
- Postal code: 7595
- Dialing code: 0541

Lemselo is a hamlet in the Dutch province of Overijssel. It is a part of the municipality of Dinkelland, and lies about 3 km northwest of Oldenzaal.

Lemselo is not a statistical entity, and the postal authorities have placed it under Weerselo. It was first mentioned in the late-10th century as Lamesloe, and means "forest of Lam (person)". Despite its size, it is not marked with place name signs. In 1840, it was home to 402 people. Nowadays, it contains about 180 houses.

== Notable ==
- Gerard Veldscholten (born 1959), former professional road bicycle racer
