= André Chappuis =

French cyclist

Personal information
- Born: 16 March 1956 (age 70) Rumilly, Haute-Savoie, France

Cycling career
- Sport: Cycling
- Role: Rider

André Chappuis (born 16 March 1956 in Rumilly, Haute-Savoie) was a French former professional racing cyclist who rode in five editions of the Tour de France.
