= Rafael Acevedo (cyclist) =

Colombian cyclist

Rafaël Acevedo
Personal information
- Full name: Rafaël Antonio Acevedo Porras
- Nickname: Pichirilo
- Born: 4 May 1957 (age 69) Sogamoso, Colombia

Cycling career
- Sport: Cycling
- Current team: Retired
- Discipline: Road
- Role: Rider

Amateur teams
- 1982: Loteria de Boyaca
- 1984: Colombia–Piles Varta

Professional team
- 1985–1989: Varta–Café de Colombia–Mavic

Rafael Antonio Acevedo Porras (born 4 May 1957) is a Colombian former professional road cyclist.

== Major results ==
1979
1st Stage 9 Vuelta a Colombia
1980
4th Overall Vuelta a Colombia

1st Stage 2

1981
1st Stages 6 & 12 Vuelta a Colombia
9th Overall Tour de l'Avenir
1982
2nd Overall Vuelta a Colombia

1st Stage 7

4th Overall Tour de l'Avenir

1st Mountains classification

1984
10th Overall Vuelta a Colombia
10th Overall Clásico RCN
1986
1st Overall Vuelta a Costa
1988
1st Clásico Centenario de Armenia

=== Grand Tour general classification results timeline ===
Grand Tour	1984	1985	1986	1987	1988
Giro d'Italia	—	42	—	—	—
Tour de France	12	43	DNF	18	—
Vuelta a España	—	—	44	—	DNF
