= Paulo Ferreira (cyclist) =

Portuguese cyclist

Personal information
- Full name: Paulo José Ferreira dos Santos
- Born: May 11, 1962 (age 64) Vialonga, Portugal

Cycling career
- Sport: Cycling
- Current team: Retired
- Discipline: Road
- Role: Rider

Major wins
- Tour de France 1 individual stage (1984)

Paulo José Ferreira dos Santos (born 11 May 1962 in Vialonga) was a Portuguese professional road bicycle racer. In 1984, Ferreira achieved his greatest victory by winning stage 5 of 1984 Tour de France.

== Major results ==
1982
Volta dos Sete-Marinha Grande
1983
Volta ao Alentejo
1984
Tour de France:

Winner stage 5

1985
Rio Maior
1986
Circuito de Setubal
1987
Circuito da Malveira
1988
Prix Brigada de Transito
1990
Classica de Charneca
1991
Circuito dos Campeões
1994
Porto – Lisboa
