= Anastasio Greciano =

Spanish cyclist

Personal information
- Born: 6 January 1952 (age 74) Galapagar, Spain

Cycling career
- Sport: Cycling
- Role: Rider

Anastasio Greciano (born 6 January 1952) is a Spanish former professional racing cyclist. He rode in five editions of the Tour de France.
