= Dominique Garde =

French cyclist

Personal information
- Born: 18 March 1959 (age 67) Condrieu, France

Cycling career
- Sport: Cycling
- Role: Rider

Dominique Garde (born 18 March 1959) is a former French racing cyclist. He rode in thirteen Grand Tours between 1982 and 1991.
