= Grospierres =

- Commune
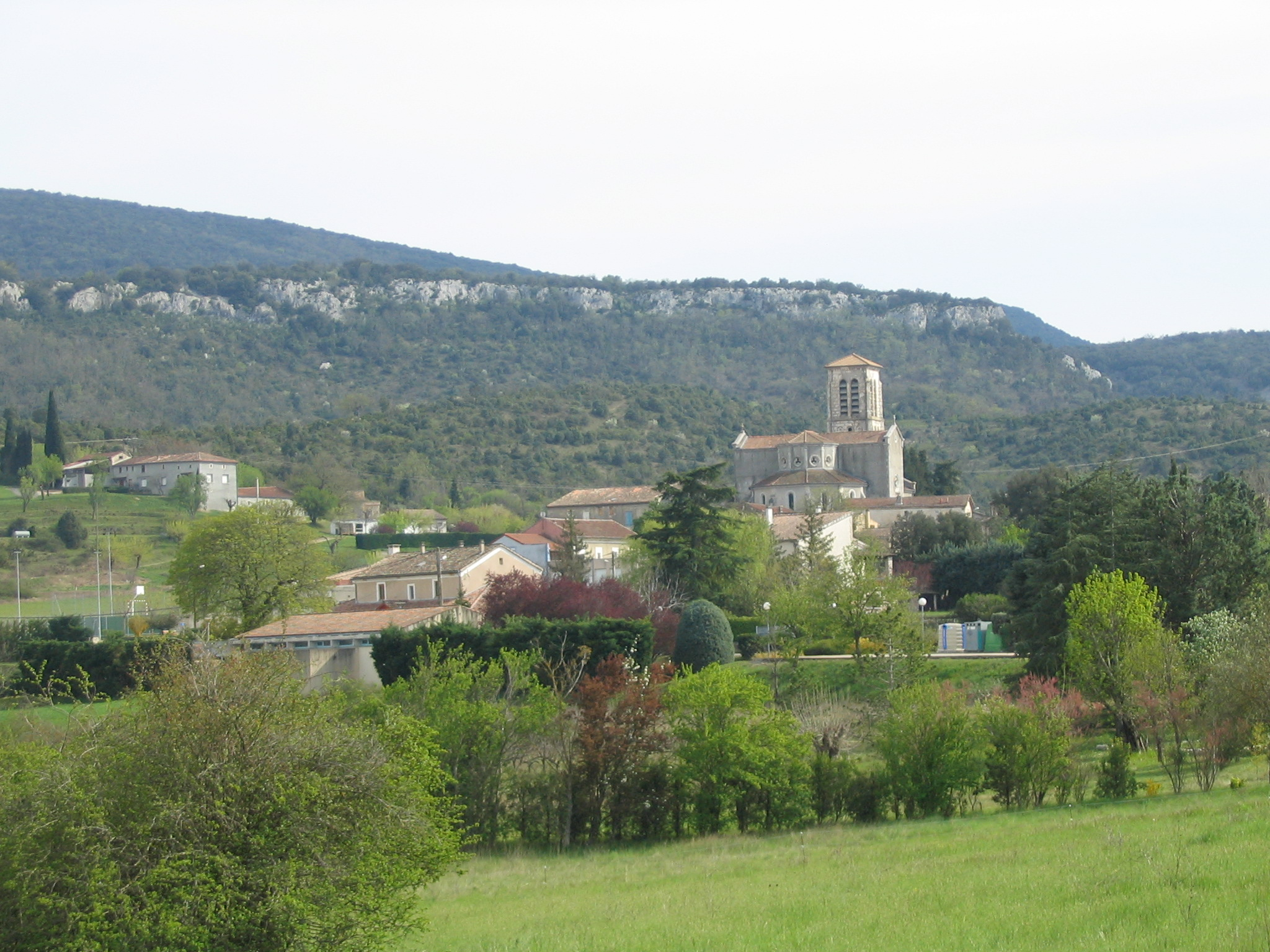
- A general view of Grospierres

- Coat of arms
- Location of Grospierres
- Location within France Location within Auvergne-Rhône-Alpes
- Coordinates: 44°24′05″N 4°17′24″E
- Country: France
- Region: Auvergne-Rhône-Alpes
- Department: Ardèche
- Arrondissement: Largentière
- Canton: Vallon-Pont-d'Arc

Government
  - Mayor (2020–2026): Denise Garcia née Guigon
- Area^{1}: 27.3 km^{2} (10.5 sq mi)
- Elevation: 124 m (407 ft)
- Highest elevation: 550 m (1,800 ft)
- Lowest elevation: 96 m (315 ft)
- Population (2023): 941
  - Density: 34.5/km^{2} (89.3/sq mi)
- Time zone: UTC+01:00 (CET)
  - Summer (DST): UTC+02:00 (CEST)
- INSEE/Postal code: 07101 /07120
- ^{1} French Land Register data, which excludes lakes, ponds, glaciers > 1 km^{2} (0.386 sq mi or 247 acres) and river estuaries.

Grospierres (French pronunciation: [ɡʁopjɛʁ]; Occitan: Grans pèiras) is a commune in the Ardèche department in southern France.

== Population ==
Historical population
Year	Pop.	±% p.a.
1968	460	—
1975	426	−1.09%
1982	551	+3.74%
1990	507	−1.03%
1999	624	+2.33%
2007	816	+3.41%
2012	875	+1.41%
2017	885	+0.23%
2023	941	+1.03%
Source: INSEE

== See also ==
- Communes of the Ardèche department
