= Marc Dierickx =

Belgian cyclist

Personal information
- Born: 24 October 1954 (age 71) Temse, Belgium

Cycling career
- Sport: Cycling
- Discipline: Road
- Role: Rider

Marc Dierickx (born 24 October 1954) is a former Belgian racing cyclist. He rode in six editions of the Tour de France between 1979 and 1984.
