= Gilles Mas =

French cyclist

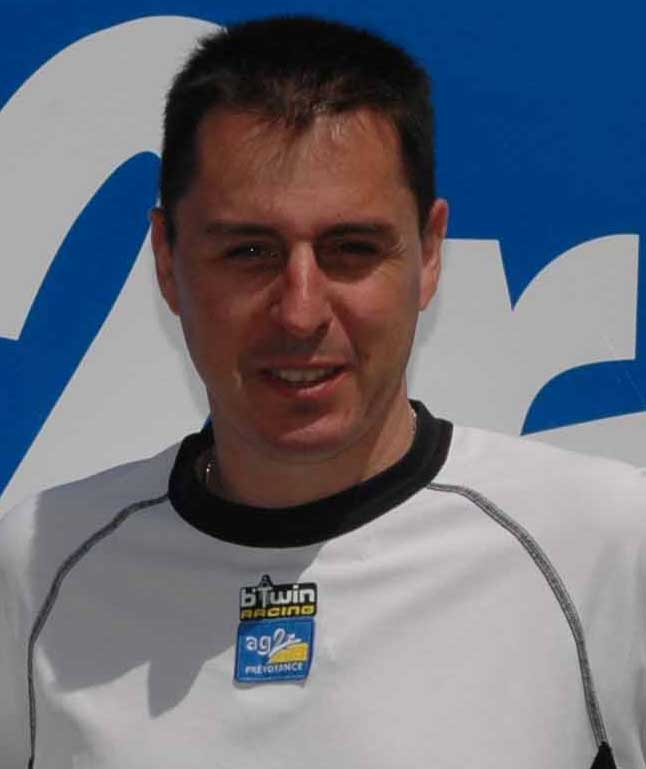
- Gilles Mas in 2006

Personal information
- Born: 5 January 1961 (age 65) Condrieu, France

Cycling career
- Sport: Cycling
- Role: Rider

Gilles Mas (born 5 January 1961) is a French former professional racing cyclist. He rode in five editions of the Tour de France and two editions of the Vuelta a España.
