= Vincent Barteau =

French cyclist (born 1962)

Personal information
- Full name: Vincent Barteau
- Born: 18 March 1962 (age 64) Caen, France

Cycling career
- Sport: Cycling
- Discipline: Road
- Role: Rider

Major wins
- One stage Tour de France

Vincent Barteau (born 18 March 1962 in Caen) is a former French road racing cyclist. He is best known for wearing the yellow jersey in the 1984 Tour de France, retaining the lead for 12 days, and winning the stage on Bastille Day in the 1989 Tour de France. He retired the following year. After retirement he bought a franchise from the Jeff de Bruges chocolate brand and operates three Jeff de Bruges shops in his native Normandy. In addition he directs the Tour de France's publicity caravan and has performed as a stand-up comedian and worked as a consultant for Eurosport.

== Major results ==
1984
Circuit des genêts verts
Maël-Pestivien
Polynormand
Saint-Martin de Landelles
Tour de France:

Wearing yellow jersey for twelve days

1985
Ronde d'Aix-en-Provence
1989
Barentin
Lisieux
Tour de France:

Winner stage 13
