= Jacques Hanegraaf =

Dutch cyclist (born 1960)

Personal information
- Full name: Jacobus Johannes Henricus Hanegraaf
- Born: 14 December 1960 (age 65) Rijsbergen, Netherlands

Cycling career
- Sport: Cycling
- Discipline: Road
- Role: Rider

Professional teams
- 1981–1983: TI–Raleigh
- 1984–1986: Kwantum Hallen-Yoko
- 1987–1988: Superconfex-Yoko
- 1989–1990: TVM–Ragno
- 1991–1992: Panasonic-Sportlife
- 1993–1994: Team Telekom

Major wins
- Paris–Brussels (1982); Amstel Gold Race (1984)

Jacobus Johannes Henricus "Jacques" Hanegraaf (born 14 December 1960) is a retired road bicycle racer from the Netherlands, who was a professional rider from 1981 to 1994. He twice won the Dutch title in the men's road race (1981 and 1985). His other major wins include the 1984 Amstel Gold Race. Hanegraaf later became a cycling manager, first for TVM and later for Team Bianchi and Unibet.com. He also competed in the individual road race and team time trial events at the 1980 Summer Olympics.

== Major results ==
1980
Ronde van Midden-Nederland
1981
Maastricht
(Netherlands) Dutch National Road Race Championship
's Heerenhoek
Maastricht-Amby
1982
Grand Prix of Aargau Canton
Galder
Paris–Brussels
1983
Zwevezele
1984
Acht van Chaam
Amstel Gold Race
Rotterdam
Zuiddorpe
Made
Ede
Meerssen
Diemen
1984 Tour de France:

Winner intermediate sprints classification
Wearing yellow jersey for two days

1985
Breda
Elfstedenronde
(Netherlands) Dutch National Road Race Championship
Zuiderzee Derny tour
1987
Zwevezele
1988
Omloop Leiedal
Made
1989
GP Liberation
1992
Malderen
Veenendaal–Veenendaal
Helchteren

== See also ==
- List of Dutch Olympic cyclists
- List of Dutch cyclists who have led the Tour de France general classification

Sporting positions
Preceded by Johan van der Velde	Dutch National Road Race Champion; 1981	Succeeded by Johan van der Velde
Preceded by Jan Raas	Dutch National Road Race Champion; 1985	Succeeded by Jos Lammertink
