= Leo van Vliet =

Dutch cyclist

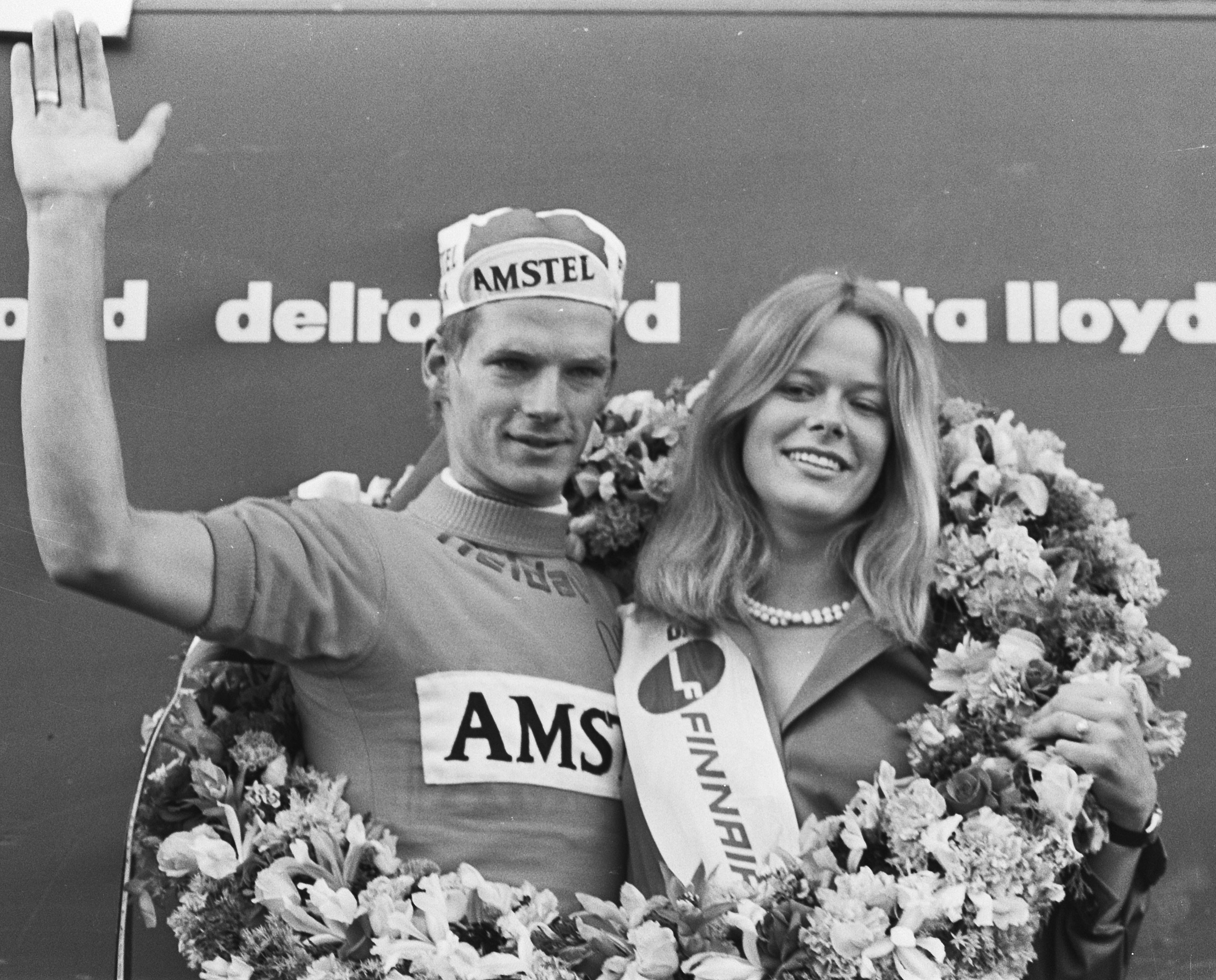
- Leo van Vliet in 1976

Personal information
- Full name: Leonardus Quirinus Machutus van Vliet
- Born: 15 November 1955 (age 70) Honselersdijk, the Netherlands
- Height: 1.81 m (5 ft 11 in)
- Weight: 65 kg (143 lb)

Cycling career
- Sport: Cycling
- Discipline: Road
- Role: Rider

Professional teams
- 1978: Miko-Mercier
- 1979–1983: TI–Raleigh
- 1984–1986: Kwantum Hallen-Yoko

Major wins
- Gent–Wevelgem (1983); 1 stage 1979 Tour de France

Leonardus Quirinus Machutus ("Leo") van Vliet (born 15 November 1955) was a professional racing cyclist from 1978 to 1986. He came in 40th in the road race at the 1976 Summer Olympics in Montreal, Quebec, Canada.

Van Vliet's biggest success was the 1983 Gent–Wevelgem. He also won the seventh stage of the 1979 Tour de France. After his career, he became the director of the only Dutch cycling classic, the Amstel Gold Race. He is not related to another Dutch cyclist of the 1980s, Teun van Vliet.

== Tour de France results ==
- 1980 – 51st
- 1982 – 52nd
- 1984 – 75th
- 1985 – 79th

== Major results ==
1976
Olympia's Tour
1977
Omloop der Kempen
Ronde van Limburg
1978
Santpoort
1979
GP de Wallonie
Hengelo
Tour de France:

Winner stage 7

Made
Profronde van Wateringen
Kortenhoef
1980
GP Barjac
GP Stad Vilvoorde
Hansweert
La Marseillaise
Largentière
Maarheze
Mijl van Mares
Profronde van Pijnacker
Steenwijk
Valkenburg
1982
Gouden Pijl Emmen
Kloosterzande
Petegem-aan-de-Leie
Sint-Willebrord
Profronde van Wateringen
1983
Netherlands National Track Points Race Championship
Four Days of Dunkirk
Schijndel
Valkenburg
Gent–Wevelgem
Leende
1984
Dongen
Hansweert
Kortenhoef
1985
Maasland
Tiel

== See also ==
- List of Dutch Olympic cyclists
