= Pascal Jules =

French cyclist

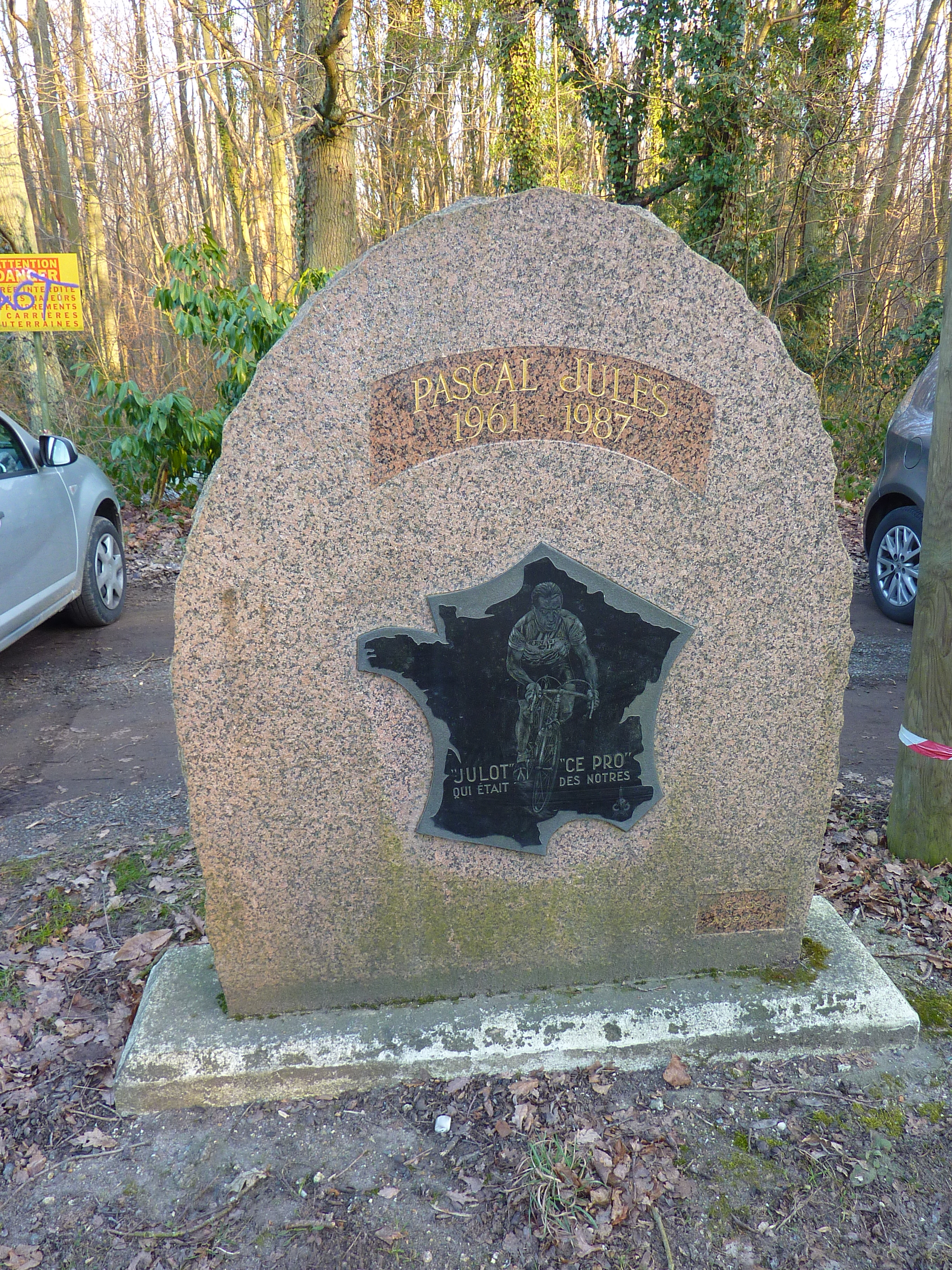

Personal information
- Full name: Pascal Jules
- Born: 22 July 1961 La Garenne-Colombes, France
- Died: 25 October 1987 (aged 26)

Cycling career
- Sport: Cycling
- Discipline: Road
- Role: Rider

Professional teams
- 1982–1985: Renault–Elf–Gitane
- 1986–1987: Seat–Orbea

Major wins
- Grand Tours Tour de France 1 individual stage (1984)

Pascal Jules (22 July 1961, in La Garenne-Colombes – 25 October 1987, in Bernay) was a French professional road bicycle racer.

== Career ==
Jules was a close friend of Laurent Fignon whom he rode with at Renault–Elf between 1982 and 1985. Jules won one stage in the 1984 Tour de France. With Fignon, Marc Madiot and Greg LeMond, Jules was part of a quartet in that Renault team who were keen to succeed the legendary Bernard Hinault. However, after being thrown back by injury and a fight with team director Cyrille Guimard, he joined Marino Lejarreta's Seat–Orbea team.

== Death ==
He died in 1987 following a car crash in Normandy, after returning from a football match for a charitable association.

In his autobiography entitled Nous étions jeunes et insouciants ("We were young and carefree") Laurent Fignon remembers Pascal Jules by saying: "It was unsaid but there was a pact of kinship between us which was so strong, so inviolable, almost sacred, that it would last as long as life lasted. But some lives don't last that long."

== Personal life ==
Jules was the father of Justin Jules, who became a professional cyclist himself.

== Career achievements ==
=== Major results ===
1982
1st Stage 4 Étoile des Espoirs
1st Stage 11 Tour de l'Avenir
1st Stage 4b Critérium du Dauphiné Libéré
1st Prologue Tour de Luxembourg
2nd Giro di Lombardia
2nd Giro del Piemonte
2nd Paris–Brussels
4th GP de Denain
1983
1st Overall Tour de l'Oise

1st Prologue

1st Overall Circuit Cycliste de la Sarthe

1st Stage 2

1st Stage 1 Tour d'Armorique
3rd Liège–Bastogne–Liège
5th Overall Four Days of Dunkirk
5th Grand Prix Cerami
6th GP de la Ville de Rennes
9th Bordeaux–Paris
1984
1st Stage 8 Tour de France
1st Stage 2a Tour Midi-Pyrénées
3rd Road race, National Road Championships
10th Liège–Bastogne–Liège
1985
1st Overall Circuit Cycliste de la Sarthe
3rd Overall Tour de l'Oise
1986
1st Stage 11 Tour de la Communauté Européenne
1987
1st Stage 4 Vuelta a Andalucía

=== Grand Tour general classification results timeline ===
Grand Tour	1983	1984	1985	1986	1987
Giro d'Italia	—	—	—	—	85
Tour de France	61	21	—	DNF	114
Vuelta a España	—	—	—	77	—

Legend
—	Did not compete
DNF	Did not finish

== See also ==
- Fignon, Laurent (2010). We Were Young and Carefree. Fotheringham, William (trans.). Random House. ISBN 0-224-08319-8.
