= Jean-François Rault =

French cyclist

Personal information
- Born: 18 June 1958 (age 68) Lamballe, France

Cycling career
- Sport: Cycling
- Current team: Retired
- Discipline: Road
- Role: Rider

Professional teams
- 1981–1982: Puch–Wolber–Campagnolo
- 1983: COOP–Mercier–Mavic
- 1984–1986: La Vie Claire
- 1987–1988: RMO–Cycles Méral–Mavic

Jean-François Rault (born 18 June 1958) is a French former professional racing cyclist. He rode in three editions of the Tour de France and one edition of the Vuelta a España.

== Major results ==
1979
1st Stage 1 Route de France
1980
1st Stage 1 Route de France
1981
1st Stage 4 Tour du Limousin
1st Stage 3 Tour du Vaucluse
5th Overall Étoile des Espoirs

1st Stage 2

5th GP de la Ville de Rennes
7th Overall Tour d'Indre-et-Loire
1982
1st GP de la Ville de Rennes
1st Stage 2 Tour du Limousin
1st Stage 4 Tour de Corse
9th GP Ouest–France
1983
1st Stage 4 Four Days of Dunkirk
9th GP Ouest–France
9th GP de la Ville de Rennes
1984
1st Stage 1 Tour d'Armorique
1985
1st Stages 5 & 7 Tour of Sweden
1987
4th Overall Tour d'Armorique
6th GP Ouest–France
8th Bordeaux–Paris
8th GP de la Ville de Rennes
1988
1st Bordeaux–Paris
