= Gerard Veldscholten =

Dutch cyclist

Personal information
- Full name: Gerard Veldscholten
- Born: 19 August 1959 (age 67) Lemselo, the Netherlands

Cycling career
- Sport: Cycling
- Discipline: Road
- Role: Rider

Professional teams
- 1982–1983: Raleigh
- 1984–1985: Panasonic
- 1986–1987: PDM-Concorde
- 1988–1990: Helvetia–La Suisse
- 1991: Telekom

Gerard Veldscholten (born 19 August 1959 in Lemselo, Overijssel) is a Dutch former professional road bicycle racer. In 1985 he placed 2nd in the Dutch National Championship and also performed well in the 1985 UCI Road World Championships finishing within the group just three seconds behind winner Joop Zoetemelk. In 1988 he finished 7th in Paris–Roubaix and won the Tour de Romandie.

== Major results ==
1980
1st Stage 3 Tour de Namur
1982
1st Stage 9a (TTT) Tour de France
1983
1st Profronde van Almelo
1st Stage 1 Tour de Romandie
1984
1st Stage 1a Critérium du Dauphiné Libéré
1st Gouden Pijl Emmen
1st GP Union Dortmund
1st Stage 3 Tour de Suisse
1985
1st Hengelo
1st Meerssen
2nd Road race, National Road Championships
1988
1st Overall Tour de Romandie
1st Hansweert
1991
1st Profronde van Almelo
1st Stage 3 Ronde van Nederland
