= Skil (cycling team) =

Skil–Sem
Team information
- UCI code: SKIL
- Registered: France
- Founded: 1984
- Disbanded: 1986
- Discipline: Road
- Status: Professional

Key personnel
- General manager: Jean de Gribaldy

Team name history
- 1984 1985: Skil–Reydel–Sem–Mavic; Skil–Sem–Kas–Miko

Skil-Sem was a French professional cycling team which competed during both the 1984 and 1985 seasons. It was the continuation of the Sem-France Loire team. Skil-Sem was the team with which the team's leader, Sean Kelly, dominated the sport in 1984. Another team member, the French rider Éric Caritoux, also won the Vuelta a España in 1984. The team was directed by Jean de Gribaldy.

== History ==
In 1984, Skil, a manufacturer of small power tools, became main sponsor of the Sem-France Loire team, directed by Jean de Gribaldy. As a member of Sem-France Loire, Kelly had twice won Paris–Nice and had won the points classification in the Tour de France two times. Kelly also won the Giro di Lombardia for the team in 1983.

During the 1984 season the team was called Skil-Sem-Mavic-Reydel and was directed by de Gribaldy and Christian Rumeau. Kelly dominated racing that spring and won 33 times in total. He won, amongst others, Paris–Roubaix, Liège–Bastogne–Liège, Blois–Chaville, the GP Ouest-France and the Grand Prix de Fourmies. Also that Spring, Éric Caritoux won the Vuelta a España. Earlier in the season, he had won the stage to Mont Ventoux in Paris–Nice (and Kelly won the overall) but the team did not enter the Vuelta a España with high ambitions. Caritoux won by six seconds.

The following year, several of the smaller co-sponsors changed and the team was called Skil-Reydel-Sem. During 1985, Kelly won Paris–Nice, the Giro di Lombardia, finished fourth in the 1985 Tour de France and won the points classification. Gerrie Knetemann won the Amstel Gold Race and Jean-Claude Leclercq became French road race champion. At the end of 1985, de Gribaldy found a new sponsor to replace Skil. Kas, a Spanish maker of soft drinks which had sponsored a team in the 1970s became the main sponsor.

The bikes used by the team had a Vitus 979 aluminium or a Vitus carbon fibre frame, both labelled "de Gribaldy", with Mavic components.

== Notable riders ==
- Jean-Claude Bagot
- René Bittinger
- Éric Caritoux
- Sean Kelly
- Jean-Claude Leclercq
- Gilles Mas
- Frédéric Vichot
- Gerrie Knetemann
- Jörg Müller

== Major wins ==
- Vuelta a España General classification 1984 (Caritoux)
- Tour de France Points classification 1985
- France Road Race Championship 1985
- Paris–Roubaix 1984
- Liège–Bastogne–Liège 1984
- Giro di Lombardia 1985
- Blois – Chaville 1984
- Amstel Gold Race 1985
- Paris–Nice 1984, 1985
- Critérium International 1984
- Tour Méditerranéen 1984
- Tour du Haut-Var 1984
- Grand Prix de Plouay 1984
- Paris–Bourges 1984
- Grand Prix d'Aix-en-Provence 1984
- GP Ouest-France 1984, 1985
- Tour of the Basque Country 1984
- Tour de Romandie 1985
- Nissan Classic 1985
- Grand Prix de Fourmies 1985
