= Europ Decor =

Team information
- Registered: Belgium
- Founded: 1982
- Disbanded: 1984
- Discipline: Road

Key personnel
- General manager: Ronald De Witte

Team name history
- 1982 1983 1984: Europ Decor; Europ Decor–Dries; Europ Decor–Boule d'Or
Europ Decor jersey
Jersey

Europ Decor was a Belgian professional cycling team that existed from 1982 to 1984. It participated in the 1984 Tour de France; Frank Hoste won the points classification and three stages, and Alfons De Wolf won a stage.

== Major wins ==
1982

- Jan Bogaert

E3 Prijs Harelbeke
Stage 2 and 3 Herald Sun Tour
1983

- Frank Hoste

Stage 16A Giro d'Italia
Stages 1, 2 and 8 Tour de Suisse

- Jan Bogaert

Scheldeprijs

- Jos Jacobs

Stage 4 Vuelta a Andalucía

- Marc Sergeant

2nd Road Race Belgian Championships
3rd Tour of Flanders
1984

- Fons De Wolf

Stage 14 Tour de France
Stage 6 Tour of Norway
Stage 1 Tour de Romandie
Stage 3 Vuelta a Andalucía

- Frank Hoste

Stages 1, 6 and 21 Tour de France
Points classification
Grand Prix de Wallonie
Hasselt-Spa-Hasselt

- Gerrie Knetemann

Grand Prix Pino Cerami

- Luc Govaerts

Stage 10 Herald Sun Tour

- Marc Sergeant

Stage 5, Tour de Suisse
2nd Overall Tour of Belgium
