= Maurice Le Guilloux =

French cyclist

Personal information
- Born: 14 May 1950 (age 76) Plédran, France

Cycling career
- Sport: Cycling
- Role: Rider

Professional teams
- 1972–1975: Gitane
- 1976–1978: Gan–Mercier–Hutchinson
- 1979–1983: Renault–Gitane
- 1984: La Vie Claire

Maurice Le Guilloux (born 14 May 1950) is a French former racing cyclist. He rode in eleven Grand Tours between 1975 and 1984. He spent much of his career as a domestique for fellow Breton cyclist Bernard Hinault and subsequently became a directeur sportif at La Vie Claire. However Le Guilloux and Hinault's friendship was damaged by the events of the 1986 Tour de France, where Le Guilloux was the directeur sportif responsible for Hinault's rival and team-mate at La Vie Claire, Greg LeMond.
