= List of teams and cyclists in the 1983 Vuelta a España =

For the 1983 Vuelta a España, the field consisted of 100 riders; 59 finished the race.

== By rider ==
Legend
No.	Starting number worn by the rider during the Vuelta
Pos.	Position in the general classification
Time	Deficit to the winner of the general classification
DNF	Denotes a rider who did not finish

No.	Name	Nationality	Team	Pos.	Time	Ref
1	Marino Lejarreta	Spain	Alfa Lum–Olmo	2	+ 1' 12"	
2	Ismael Lejarreta	Spain	Alfa Lum–Olmo	30	+ 1h 02' 39"	
3	Fiorenzo Aliverti	Italy	Alfa Lum–Olmo	49	+ 1h 35' 14"	
4	Vincenzo Cupperi	Italy	Alfa Lum–Olmo	DNF	—	
5	Giuseppe Martinelli	Italy	Alfa Lum–Olmo	DNF	—	
6	Salvatore Maccali	Italy	Alfa Lum–Olmo	50	+ 1h 36' 13"	
7	Orlando Maini	Italy	Alfa Lum–Olmo	DNF	—	
8	Piero Onesti	Italy	Alfa Lum–Olmo	DNF	—	
9	Giuseppe Petito	Italy	Alfa Lum–Olmo	DNF	—	
10	Michael Wilson	Australia	Alfa Lum–Olmo	52	+ 1h 45' 18"	
11	Franky De Gendt	Belgium	Jacky Aernoudt–Rossin–Campagnolo	DNF	—	
12	Frits van Bindsbergen	Netherlands	Jacky Aernoudt–Rossin–Campagnolo	DNF	—	
13	Hennie Kuiper	Netherlands	Jacky Aernoudt–Rossin–Campagnolo	5	+ 10' 26"	
14	Marcel Laurens	Belgium	Jacky Aernoudt–Rossin–Campagnolo	58	+ 2h 18' 32"	
15	Henri Manders	Netherlands	Jacky Aernoudt–Rossin–Campagnolo	56	+ 2h 07' 19"	
16	René Martens	Belgium	Jacky Aernoudt–Rossin–Campagnolo	48	+ 1h 35' 06"	
17	Guy Nulens	Belgium	Jacky Aernoudt–Rossin–Campagnolo	26	+ 59' 11"	
18	Philip Vandeginste	Belgium	Jacky Aernoudt–Rossin–Campagnolo	DNF	—	
19	Wim Van Eynde	Belgium	Jacky Aernoudt–Rossin–Campagnolo	DNF	—	
20	Eric Vanderaerden	Belgium	Jacky Aernoudt–Rossin–Campagnolo	DNF	—	
21	Sabino Angoitia	Spain	Hueso	53	+ 1h 51' 21"	
22	José Antonio Cabrero Martínez	Spain	Hueso	16	+ 36' 35"	
23	Guillermo De La Peña	Spain	Hueso	11	+ 19' 59"	
24	Juan María Eguiarte Soleagui	Spain	Hueso	46	+ 1h 25' 02"	
25	Isidro Juárez	Spain	Hueso	39	+ 1h 14' 12"	
26	Carlos Machín Rodríguez	Spain	Hueso	44	+ 1h 19' 11"	
27	Enrique Martínez Heredia	Spain	Hueso	42	+ 1h 17' 18"	
28	Juan Pujol Pagés	Spain	Hueso	43	+ 1h 19' 11"	
29	Francisco Sala Oliveras	Spain	Hueso	DNF	—	
30	Jesús Suárez Cueva	Spain	Hueso	32	+ 1h 05' 42"	
31	Claudio Bortolotto	Italy	Del Tongo–Colnago	14	+ 34' 50"	
32	Roberto Ceruti	Italy	Del Tongo–Colnago	23	+ 52' 52"	
33	Stefano Guerrieri	Italy	Del Tongo–Colnago	DNF	—	
34	Leonardo Natale	Italy	Del Tongo–Colnago	18	+ 45' 41"	
35	Rudy Pevenage	Belgium	Del Tongo–Colnago	DNF	—	
36	Alberto Saronni	Italy	Del Tongo–Colnago	57	+ 2h 16' 17"	
37	Giuseppe Saronni	Italy	Del Tongo–Colnago	DNF	—	
38	Dietrich Thurau	West Germany	Del Tongo–Colnago	36	+ 1h 12' 51"	
39	Guido Van Calster	Belgium	Del Tongo–Colnago	35	+ 1h 08' 57"	
40	Willy Vigouroux	Belgium	Del Tongo–Colnago	54	+ 1h 57' 34"	
41	Francisco Albelda	Spain	Kelme	DNF	—	
42	Vicente Belda	Spain	Kelme	9	+ 13' 08"	
43	José María Caroz	Spain	Kelme	55	+ 1h 57' 55"	
44	Ángel de las Heras	Spain	Kelme	20	+ 46' 41"	
45	Arsenio González	Spain	Kelme	33	+ 1h 07' 14"	
46	Jesús Guzmán Delgado	Spain	Kelme	34	+ 1h 07' 32"	
47	Jeronimo Ibañez Escribano	Spain	Kelme	DNF	—	
48	Miguel Ángel Iglesias	Spain	Kelme	DNF	—	
49	José Recio	Spain	Kelme	29	+ 1h 02' 12"	
50	Mariano Sánchez Martinez	Spain	Kelme	27	+ 1h 00' 08"	
51	Bernard Becaas	France	Renault–Elf	59	+ 2h 28' 27"	
52	Lucien Didier	Luxembourg	Renault–Elf	19	+ 46' 12"	
53	Laurent Fignon	France	Renault–Elf	7	+ 11' 27"	
54	Dominique Gaigne	France	Renault–Elf	DNF	—	
55	Bernard Hinault	France	Renault–Elf	1	94h 28' 26"	
56	Maurice Le Guilloux	France	Renault–Elf	37	+ 1h 13' 07"	
57	Greg LeMond	United States	Renault–Elf	DNF	—	
58	Pascal Poisson	France	Renault–Elf	38	+ 1h 14' 02"	
59	Martial Gayant	France	Renault–Elf	25	+ 53' 46"	
60	Alain Vigneron	France	Renault–Elf	13	+ 34' 34"	
61	Ángel Arroyo	Spain	Reynolds	31	+ 1h 03' 34"	
62	Pedro Delgado	Spain	Reynolds	15	+ 35' 55"	
63	Eulalio García	Spain	Reynolds	DNF	—	
64	Julián Gorospe	Spain	Reynolds	12	+ 29' 32"	
65	Anastasio Greciano	Spain	Reynolds	47	+ 1h 30' 22"	
66	Carlos Hernández Bailo	Spain	Reynolds	28	+ 1h 02' 01"	
67	Jesús Hernández Úbeda	Spain	Reynolds	22	+ 51' 41"	
68	José Luis Laguía	Spain	Reynolds	24	+ 53' 42"	
69	Celestino Prieto	Spain	Reynolds	40	+ 1h 15' 45"	
70	Jaime Vilamajó	Spain	Reynolds	DNF	—	
71	Bernardo Alfonsel	Spain	Teka	DNF	—	
72	Juan-Carlos Alonso	Spain	Teka	DNF	—	
73	Jesús Blanco Villar	Spain	Teka	45	+ 1h 21' 05"	
74	Antonio Coll	Spain	Teka	DNF	—	
75	Reimund Dietzen	West Germany	Teka	DNF	—	
76	Noël Dejonckheere	Belgium	Teka	DNF	—	
77	Federico Echave	Spain	Teka	41	+ 1h 16' 51"	
78	Marc Goossens	Belgium	Teka	DNF	—	
79	Faustino Cuelli	Spain	Teka	17	+ 41' 19"	
80	Felipe Yáñez	Spain	Teka	DNF	—	
81	Ángel Camarillo	Spain	Zor–Gemeaz Cusin	51	+ 1h 36' 20"	
82	Eduardo Chozas	Spain	Zor–Gemeaz Cusin	6	+ 11' 11"	
83	Alberto Fernandez	Spain	Zor–Gemeaz Cusin	3	+ 3' 58"	
84	Juan Fernández Martín	Spain	Zor–Gemeaz Cusin	DNF	—	
85	José Luis López Cerrón	Spain	Zor–Gemeaz Cusin	DNF	—	
86	Pedro Muñoz Machín Rodríguez	Spain	Zor–Gemeaz Cusin	8	+ 12' 05"	
87	Ángel Ocaña	Spain	Zor–Gemeaz Cusin	DNF	—	
88	Álvaro Pino	Spain	Zor–Gemeaz Cusin	4	+ 5' 09"	
89	Jesús Rodríguez Magro	Spain	Zor–Gemeaz Cusin	21	+ 49' 16"	
90	Faustino Rupérez	Spain	Zor–Gemeaz Cusin	10	+ 13' 36"	
91	Roger De Cnijf	Belgium	Boule d'Or–Colnago	DNF	—	
92	Ronny De Cnodder	Belgium	Boule d'Or–Colnago	DNF	—	
93	Guy Janiszewski	Belgium	Boule d'Or–Colnago	DNF	—	
94	Eugène Urbany	Luxembourg	Boule d'Or–Colnago	DNF	—	
95	Danny Van Baelen	Belgium	Boule d'Or–Colnago	DNF	—	
96	Jan van Houwelingen	Netherlands	Boule d'Or–Colnago	DNF	—	
97	Jan Wijnants	Belgium	Boule d'Or–Colnago	DNF	—	
98	Patrick Vermeulen	Belgium	Boule d'Or–Colnago	DNF	—	
99	Daniel Willems	Belgium	Boule d'Or–Colnago	DNF	—	
100	Ludwig Wijnants	Belgium	Boule d'Or–Colnago	DNF	—	
