= 1983 Vuelta a España, Prologue to Stage 10 =

Cycling race stages

The 1983 Vuelta a España was the 38th edition of the Vuelta a España, one of cycling's Grand Tours. The Vuelta began in Almussafes, with a prologue individual time trial on 19 April, and Stage 10 occurred on 29 April with a stage to Soria. The race finished in Madrid on 8 May.

== Prologue ==
19 April 1983 — Almussafes to Almussafes, 6.8 km (4.2 mi) (ITT)

Prologue result and general classification after Prologue

Rank	Rider	Team	Time
1	Dominique Gaigne (FRA)	Renault–Elf	8' 51"
2	Jesús Blanco Villar (ESP)	Teka	+ 1"
3	Álvaro Pino (ESP)	Zor–Gemeaz Cusin	s.t.
4	Jaime Vilamajó (ESP)	Reynolds	+ 4"
5	Hennie Kuiper (NED)	Jacky Aernoudt–Rossin–Campagnolo	s.t.
6	Frits van Bindsbergen (NED)	Jacky Aernoudt–Rossin–Campagnolo	s.t.
7	Guy Janiszewski (BEL)	Boule d'Or–Colnago	+ 5"
8	Pascal Poisson (FRA)	Renault–Elf	+ 6"
9	Jeronimo Ibañez Escribano (ESP)	Kelme	s.t.
10	Martial Gayant (FRA)	Renault–Elf	+ 7"

== Stage 1 ==
20 April 1983 — Almussafes to Cuenca, 235 km (146 mi)

Stage 1 result

Rank	Rider	Team	Time
1	Juan Fernández Martín (ESP)	Zor–Gemeaz Cusin	6h 36' 17"
2	Guido Van Calster (BEL)	Del Tongo–Colnago	+ 4"
3	Jesús Suárez Cueva (ESP)	Hueso	s.t.
4	Bernard Hinault (FRA)	Renault–Elf	s.t.
5	Guy Nulens (BEL)	Jacky Aernoudt–Rossin–Campagnolo	s.t.
6	Giuseppe Petito (ITA)	Alfa Lum–Olmo	s.t.
7	Hennie Kuiper (NED)	Jacky Aernoudt–Rossin–Campagnolo	+ 6"
8	Eduardo Chozas (ESP)	Zor–Gemeaz Cusin	s.t.
9	Dominique Gaigne (FRA)	Renault–Elf	+ 9"
10	Ludwig Wijnants (BEL)	Boule d'Or–Colnago	s.t.

General classification after Stage 1

Rank	Rider	Team	Time
1	Dominique Gaigne (FRA)	Renault–Elf	6h 45' 17"
2	Hennie Kuiper (NED)	Jacky Aernoudt–Rossin–Campagnolo	+ 1"
3	Bernard Hinault (FRA)	Renault–Elf	+ 6"
4	Juan Fernández Martín (ESP)	Zor–Gemeaz Cusin	+ 9"
5	Giuseppe Petito (ITA)	Alfa Lum–Olmo	+ 17"
6	Julián Gorospe (ESP)	Reynolds	+ 20"
7	Jesús Suárez Cueva (ESP)	Hueso	+ 22"
8	Guy Nulens (BEL)	Jacky Aernoudt–Rossin–Campagnolo	+ 26"
9	Arsenio González (ESP)	Kelme	s.t.
10	Juan-Carlos Alonso (ESP)	Teka	+ 27"

== Stage 2 ==
21 April 1983 — Cuenca to Teruel, 152 km (94 mi)

Stage 2 result

Rank	Rider	Team	Time
1	Eric Vanderaerden (BEL)	Jacky Aernoudt–Rossin–Campagnolo	3h 50' 10"
2	Giuseppe Saronni (ITA)	Del Tongo–Colnago	s.t.
3	Patrick Vermeulen (BEL)	Boule d'Or–Colnago	s.t.
4	Giuseppe Martinelli (ITA)	Alfa Lum–Olmo	s.t.
5	Laurent Fignon (FRA)	Renault–Elf	s.t.
6	Juan Fernández Martín (ESP)	Zor–Gemeaz Cusin	s.t.
7	Giuseppe Petito (ITA)	Alfa Lum–Olmo	s.t.
8	Greg LeMond (USA)	Renault–Elf	s.t.
9	Sabino Angoitia (ESP)	Hueso	s.t.
10	Jesús Suárez Cueva (ESP)	Hueso	s.t.

General classification after Stage 2

Rank	Rider	Team	Time
1	Dominique Gaigne (FRA)	Renault–Elf	10h 35' 27"
2	Hennie Kuiper (NED)	Jacky Aernoudt–Rossin–Campagnolo	+ 1"
3	Bernard Hinault (FRA)	Renault–Elf	+ 6"
4	Juan Fernández Martín (ESP)	Zor–Gemeaz Cusin	+ 9"
5	Giuseppe Petito (ITA)	Alfa Lum–Olmo	+ 17"
6	Julián Gorospe (ESP)	Reynolds	+ 20"
7	Jesús Suárez Cueva (ESP)	Hueso	+ 22"
8	Guy Nulens (BEL)	Jacky Aernoudt–Rossin–Campagnolo	+ 26"
9	Arsenio González (ESP)	Kelme	s.t.
10	Juan-Carlos Alonso (ESP)	Teka	+ 27"

== Stage 3 ==
22 April 1983 — Teruel to Sant Carles de la Ràpita, 241 km (150 mi)

Stage 3 result

Rank	Rider	Team	Time
1	Giuseppe Petito (ITA)	Alfa Lum–Olmo	6h 35' 24"
2	José Luis Laguía (ESP)	Reynolds	s.t.
3	Eric Vanderaerden (BEL)	Jacky Aernoudt–Rossin–Campagnolo	s.t.
4	Juan Fernández Martín (ESP)	Zor–Gemeaz Cusin	s.t.
5	Jesús Suárez Cueva (ESP)	Hueso	s.t.
6	Michael Wilson (AUS)	Alfa Lum–Olmo	s.t.
7	Giuseppe Saronni (ITA)	Del Tongo–Colnago	s.t.
8	Giuseppe Martinelli (ITA)	Alfa Lum–Olmo	s.t.
9	Jesús Blanco Villar (ESP)	Teka	s.t.
10	Dietrich Thurau (FRG)	Del Tongo–Colnago	s.t.

General classification after Stage 3

Rank	Rider	Team	Time
1	Dominique Gaigne (FRA)	Renault–Elf	17h 10' 51"
2	Hennie Kuiper (NED)	Jacky Aernoudt–Rossin–Campagnolo	+ 1"
3	Bernard Hinault (FRA)	Renault–Elf	+ 6"
4	Juan Fernández Martín (ESP)	Zor–Gemeaz Cusin	+ 9"
5	Giuseppe Petito (ITA)	Alfa Lum–Olmo	+ 17"
6	Julián Gorospe (ESP)	Reynolds	+ 20"
7	Jesús Suárez Cueva (ESP)	Hueso	+ 22"
8	Guy Nulens (BEL)	Jacky Aernoudt–Rossin–Campagnolo	+ 26"
9	Arsenio González (ESP)	Kelme	s.t.
10	Juan-Carlos Alonso (ESP)	Teka	+ 27"

== Stage 4 ==
23 April 1983 — Sant Carles de la Ràpita to Sant Quirze del Vallès, 192 km (119 mi)

Stage 4 result

Rank	Rider	Team	Time
1	Laurent Fignon (FRA)	Renault–Elf	5h 17' 02"
2	Antonio Coll (ESP)	Teka	s.t.
3	Marino Lejarreta (ESP)	Alfa Lum–Olmo	+ 3"
4	Giuseppe Petito (ITA)	Alfa Lum–Olmo	+ 20"
5	Noël Dejonckheere (BEL)	Teka	s.t.
6	Marc Goossens (BEL)	Teka	s.t.
7	Guy Janiszewski (BEL)	Boule d'Or–Colnago	s.t.
8	Jesús Suárez Cueva (ESP)	Hueso	s.t.
9	Dietrich Thurau (FRG)	Del Tongo–Colnago	s.t.
10	Eric Vanderaerden (BEL)	Jacky Aernoudt–Rossin–Campagnolo	s.t.

General classification after Stage 4

Rank	Rider	Team	Time
1	Dominique Gaigne (FRA)	Renault–Elf	22h 28' 13"
2	Hennie Kuiper (NED)	Jacky Aernoudt–Rossin–Campagnolo	+ 1"
3	Bernard Hinault (FRA)	Renault–Elf	+ 6"
4	Juan Fernández Martín (ESP)	Zor–Gemeaz Cusin	+ 9"
5	Giuseppe Petito (ITA)	Alfa Lum–Olmo	+ 17"
6	Julián Gorospe (ESP)	Reynolds	+ 20"
7	Jesús Suárez Cueva (ESP)	Hueso	+ 22"
8	Guy Nulens (BEL)	Jacky Aernoudt–Rossin–Campagnolo	+ 26"
9	Arsenio González (ESP)	Kelme	s.t.
10	Marino Lejarreta (ESP)	Alfa Lum–Olmo	s.t.

== Stage 5 ==
24 April 1983 — Sant Quirze del Vallès to Castellar de n'Hug, 195 km (121 mi)

Stage 5 result

Rank	Rider	Team	Time
1	Alberto Fernandez (ESP)	Zor–Gemeaz Cusin	5h 59' 20"
2	Bernard Hinault (FRA)	Renault–Elf	+ 3"
3	Marino Lejarreta (ESP)	Alfa Lum–Olmo	s.t.
4	Reimund Dietzen (FRG)	Teka	s.t.
5	Pedro Muñoz Machín Rodríguez (ESP)	Zor–Gemeaz Cusin	s.t.
6	Vicente Belda (ESP)	Kelme	+ 5"
7	Laurent Fignon (FRA)	Renault–Elf	s.t.
8	Faustino Rupérez (ESP)	Zor–Gemeaz Cusin	s.t.
9	Jesús Rodríguez Magro (ESP)	Zor–Gemeaz Cusin	s.t.
10	Antonio Coll (ESP)	Teka	+ 9"

General classification after Stage 5

Rank	Rider	Team	Time
1	Bernard Hinault (FRA)	Renault–Elf	28h 27' 42"
2	Hennie Kuiper (NED)	Jacky Aernoudt–Rossin–Campagnolo	+ 1"
3	Marino Lejarreta (ESP)	Alfa Lum–Olmo	+ 10"
4	Julián Gorospe (ESP)	Reynolds	s.t.
5	Laurent Fignon (FRA)	Renault–Elf	+ 24"
6	Antonio Coll (ESP)	Teka	+ 27"
7	Juan-Carlos Alonso (ESP)	Teka	s.t.
8	Jesús Rodríguez Magro (ESP)	Zor–Gemeaz Cusin	+ 28"
9	Greg LeMond (USA)	Renault–Elf	+ 30"
10	Reimund Dietzen (FRG)	Teka	+ 41"

== Stage 6 ==
25 April 1983 — La Pobla de Lillet to Viella, 235 km (146 mi)

Stage 6 result

Rank	Rider	Team	Time
1	Marino Lejarreta (ESP)	Alfa Lum–Olmo	7h 38' 26"
2	Julián Gorospe (ESP)	Reynolds	s.t.
3	Pedro Delgado (ESP)	Reynolds	+ 3"
4	Alberto Fernandez (ESP)	Zor–Gemeaz Cusin	s.t.
5	Pedro Muñoz Machín Rodríguez (ESP)	Zor–Gemeaz Cusin	+ 25"
6	Vicente Belda (ESP)	Kelme	s.t.
7	Eduardo Chozas (ESP)	Zor–Gemeaz Cusin	+ 31"
8	Guillermo De La Peña (ESP)	Hueso	+ 38"
9	Antonio Coll (ESP)	Teka	s.t.
10	Álvaro Pino (ESP)	Zor–Gemeaz Cusin	s.t.

General classification after Stage 6

Rank	Rider	Team	Time
1	Marino Lejarreta (ESP)	Alfa Lum–Olmo	36h 06' 28"
2	Julián Gorospe (ESP)	Reynolds	s.t.
3	Bernard Hinault (FRA)	Renault–Elf	+ 22"
4	Alberto Fernandez (ESP)	Zor–Gemeaz Cusin	+ 25"
5	Antonio Coll (ESP)	Teka	+ 49"
6	Pedro Muñoz Machín Rodríguez (ESP)	Zor–Gemeaz Cusin	+ 57"
7	Eduardo Chozas (ESP)	Zor–Gemeaz Cusin	+ 1' 05"
8	Faustino Rupérez (ESP)	Zor–Gemeaz Cusin	+ 1' 08"
9	Vicente Belda (ESP)	Kelme	+ 1' 21"
10	Laurent Fignon (FRA)	Renault–Elf	s.t.

== Stage 7 ==
26 April 1983 — Les to Sabiñánigo, 137 km (85 mi)

Stage 7 result

Rank	Rider	Team	Time
1	Jesús Suárez Cueva (ESP)	Hueso	4h 07' 15"
2	Juan Fernández Martín (ESP)	Zor–Gemeaz Cusin	s.t.
3	Guido Van Calster (BEL)	Del Tongo–Colnago	s.t.
4	Guy Janiszewski (BEL)	Boule d'Or–Colnago	s.t.
5	Sabino Angoitia (ESP)	Hueso	s.t.
6	Guy Nulens (BEL)	Jacky Aernoudt–Rossin–Campagnolo	s.t.
7	José María Caroz (ESP)	Kelme	s.t.
8	Federico Echave (ESP)	Teka	s.t.
9	Reimund Dietzen (FRG)	Teka	s.t.
10	Marino Lejarreta (ESP)	Alfa Lum–Olmo	s.t.

General classification after Stage 7

Rank	Rider	Team	Time
1	Marino Lejarreta (ESP)	Alfa Lum–Olmo	40h 13' 43"
2	Julián Gorospe (ESP)	Reynolds	s.t.
3	Bernard Hinault (FRA)	Renault–Elf	+ 22"
4	Alberto Fernandez (ESP)	Zor–Gemeaz Cusin	+ 25"
5	Antonio Coll (ESP)	Teka	+ 49"
6	Pedro Muñoz Machín Rodríguez (ESP)	Zor–Gemeaz Cusin	+ 50"
7	Eduardo Chozas (ESP)	Zor–Gemeaz Cusin	+ 57"
8	Faustino Rupérez (ESP)	Zor–Gemeaz Cusin	+ 1' 05"
9	Vicente Belda (ESP)	Kelme	+ 1' 08"
10	Laurent Fignon (FRA)	Renault–Elf	+ 1' 21"

== Stage 8 ==
27 April 1983 — Sabiñánigo to Balneario de Panticosa, 38 km (24 mi) (ITT)

Stage 8 result

Rank	Rider	Team	Time
1	Marino Lejarreta (ESP)	Alfa Lum–Olmo	1h 05' 25"
2	Alberto Fernandez (ESP)	Zor–Gemeaz Cusin	+ 10"
3	Julián Gorospe (ESP)	Reynolds	+ 33"
4	Antonio Coll (ESP)	Teka	+ 1' 27"
5	Pedro Muñoz Machín Rodríguez (ESP)	Zor–Gemeaz Cusin	s.t.
6	Hennie Kuiper (NED)	Jacky Aernoudt–Rossin–Campagnolo	+ 2' 12"
7	Faustino Rupérez (ESP)	Zor–Gemeaz Cusin	s.t.
8	Álvaro Pino (ESP)	Zor–Gemeaz Cusin	s.t.
9	Bernard Hinault (FRA)	Renault–Elf	+ 2' 13"
10	Juan-Carlos Alonso (ESP)	Teka	+ 2' 59"

General classification after Stage 8

Rank	Rider	Team	Time
1	Marino Lejarreta (ESP)	Alfa Lum–Olmo	41h 14' 08"
2	Julián Gorospe (ESP)	Reynolds	+ 33"
3	Alberto Fernandez (ESP)	Zor–Gemeaz Cusin	+ 35"
4	Antonio Coll (ESP)	Teka	+ 1' 16"
5	Pedro Muñoz Machín Rodríguez (ESP)	Zor–Gemeaz Cusin	+ 1' 17"
6	Bernard Hinault (FRA)	Renault–Elf	+ 2' 35"
7	Faustino Rupérez (ESP)	Zor–Gemeaz Cusin	+ 3' 17"
8	Hennie Kuiper (NED)	Jacky Aernoudt–Rossin–Campagnolo	+ 3' 41"
9	Álvaro Pino (ESP)	Zor–Gemeaz Cusin	+ 4' 16"
10	Reimund Dietzen (FRG)	Teka	+ 4' 44"

== Stage 9 ==
28 April 1983 — Panticosa to Alfajarín, 183 km (114 mi)

Stage 9 result

Rank	Rider	Team	Time
1	Giuseppe Saronni (ITA)	Del Tongo–Colnago	4h 31' 01"
2	Pedro Muñoz Machín Rodríguez (ESP)	Zor–Gemeaz Cusin	+ 4"
3	Laurent Fignon (FRA)	Renault–Elf	+ 5"
4	Eric Vanderaerden (BEL)	Jacky Aernoudt–Rossin–Campagnolo	+ 6"
5	Marino Lejarreta (ESP)	Alfa Lum–Olmo	+ 8"
6	Bernard Hinault (FRA)	Renault–Elf	s.t.
7	Jesús Suárez Cueva (ESP)	Hueso	s.t.
8	Jan Wijnants (BEL)	Boule d'Or–Colnago	s.t.
9	Alberto Fernandez (ESP)	Zor–Gemeaz Cusin	s.t.
10	Antonio Coll (ESP)	Teka	s.t.

General classification after Stage 9

Rank	Rider	Team	Time
1	Marino Lejarreta (ESP)	Alfa Lum–Olmo	45h 50' 17"
2	Julián Gorospe (ESP)	Reynolds	+ 33"
3	Alberto Fernandez (ESP)	Zor–Gemeaz Cusin	+ 35"
4	Pedro Muñoz Machín Rodríguez (ESP)	Zor–Gemeaz Cusin	+ 2' 13"
5	Antonio Coll (ESP)	Teka	+ 2' 16"
6	Bernard Hinault (FRA)	Renault–Elf	+ 2' 35"
7	Faustino Rupérez (ESP)	Zor–Gemeaz Cusin	+ 3' 27"
8	Hennie Kuiper (NED)	Jacky Aernoudt–Rossin–Campagnolo	+ 3' 51"
9	Álvaro Pino (ESP)	Zor–Gemeaz Cusin	+ 4' 16"
10	Reimund Dietzen (FRG)	Teka	+ 4' 44"

== Stage 10 ==
29 April 1983 — Zaragoza to Soria, 174 km (108 mi)

Stage 10 result

Rank	Rider	Team	Time
1	Giuseppe Saronni (ITA)	Del Tongo–Colnago	4h 33' 19"
2	Enrique Martínez Heredia (ESP)	Hueso	s.t.
3	Bernard Hinault (FRA)	Renault–Elf	s.t.
4	Maurice Le Guilloux (FRA)	Renault–Elf	s.t.
5	Julián Gorospe (ESP)	Reynolds	s.t.
6	Alberto Fernandez (ESP)	Zor–Gemeaz Cusin	s.t.
7	Lucien Didier (LUX)	Renault–Elf	s.t.
8	Hennie Kuiper (NED)	Jacky Aernoudt–Rossin–Campagnolo	s.t.
9	Guido Van Calster (BEL)	Del Tongo–Colnago	+ 25"
10	José Recio (ESP)	Kelme	+ 2' 35"

General classification after Stage 10

Rank	Rider	Team	Time
1	Julián Gorospe (ESP)	Reynolds	50h 24' 09"
2	Alberto Fernandez (ESP)	Zor–Gemeaz Cusin	+ 2"
3	Bernard Hinault (FRA)	Renault–Elf	+ 2' 02"
4	Marino Lejarreta (ESP)	Alfa Lum–Olmo	+ 2' 06"
5	Hennie Kuiper (NED)	Jacky Aernoudt–Rossin–Campagnolo	+ 3' 19"
6	Pedro Muñoz Machín Rodríguez (ESP)	Zor–Gemeaz Cusin	+ 4' 19"
7	Antonio Coll (ESP)	Teka	+ 4' 22"
8	Faustino Rupérez (ESP)	Zor–Gemeaz Cusin	+ 5' 33"
9	Álvaro Pino (ESP)	Zor–Gemeaz Cusin	+ 6' 22"
10	Reimund Dietzen (FRG)	Teka	+ 6' 50"
