= 1983 Vuelta a España, Stage 11 to Stage 19 =

Cycling race stages

The 1983 Vuelta a España was the 38th edition of the Vuelta a España, one of cycling's Grand Tours. The Vuelta began in Almussafes, with a prologue individual time trial on 19 April, and Stage 11 occurred on 30 April with a stage from Soria. The race finished in Madrid on 8 May.

== Stage 11 ==
30 April 1983 — Soria to Logroño, 185 km (115 mi)

Stage 11 result

| Rank | Rider | Team | Time |
|---|---|---|---|
| 1 | Eric Vanderaerden (BEL) | Jacky Aernoudt–Rossin–Campagnolo | 4h 04' 35" |
| 2 | Giuseppe Saronni (ITA) | Del Tongo–Colnago | s.t. |
| 3 | Giuseppe Petito (ITA) | Alfa Lum–Olmo | s.t. |
| 4 | Jesús Suárez Cueva (ESP) | Hueso | s.t. |
| 5 | Marino Lejarreta (ESP) | Alfa Lum–Olmo | s.t. |
| 6 | Bernard Hinault (FRA) | Renault–Elf | s.t. |
| 7 | Reimund Dietzen (FRG) | Teka | s.t. |
| 8 | Henri Manders (NED) | Jacky Aernoudt–Rossin–Campagnolo | + 4" |
| 9 | Roberto Ceruti (ITA) | Del Tongo–Colnago | s.t. |
| 10 | Guy Janiszewski (BEL) | Boule d'Or–Colnago | s.t. |

General classification after Stage 11

| Rank | Rider | Team | Time |
|---|---|---|---|
| 1 | Alberto Fernandez (ESP) | Zor–Gemeaz Cusin | 54h 28' 50" |
| 2 | Julián Gorospe (ESP) | Reynolds | + 8" |
| 3 | Bernard Hinault (FRA) | Renault–Elf | + 1' 56" |
| 4 | Marino Lejarreta (ESP) | Alfa Lum–Olmo | + 2' 00" |
| 5 | Hennie Kuiper (NED) | Jacky Aernoudt–Rossin–Campagnolo | + 3' 16" |
| 6 | Antonio Coll (ESP) | Teka | + 5' 20" |
| 7 | Pedro Muñoz Machín Rodríguez (ESP) | Zor–Gemeaz Cusin | + 5' 27" |
| 8 | Faustino Rupérez (ESP) | Zor–Gemeaz Cusin | + 5' 41" |
| 9 | Álvaro Pino (ESP) | Zor–Gemeaz Cusin | + 6' 20" |
| 10 | Reimund Dietzen (FRG) | Teka | + 6' 44" |

== Stage 12 ==
1 May 1983 — Logroño to Burgos, 147 km (91 mi)

Stage 12 result

| Rank | Rider | Team | Time |
|---|---|---|---|
| 1 | Noël Dejonckheere (BEL) | Teka | 4h 26' 20" |
| 2 | Guido Van Calster (BEL) | Del Tongo–Colnago | + 2" |
| 3 | Eric Vanderaerden (BEL) | Jacky Aernoudt–Rossin–Campagnolo | s.t. |
| 4 | Greg LeMond (USA) | Renault–Elf | s.t. |
| 5 | Jesús Suárez Cueva (ESP) | Hueso | s.t. |
| 6 | Sabino Angoitia (ESP) | Hueso | s.t. |
| 7 | Henri Manders (NED) | Jacky Aernoudt–Rossin–Campagnolo | s.t. |
| 8 | Rudy Pevenage (BEL) | Del Tongo–Colnago | s.t. |
| 9 | Pascal Poisson (FRA) | Renault–Elf | s.t. |
| 10 | Laurent Fignon (FRA) | Renault–Elf | s.t. |

General classification after Stage 12

| Rank | Rider | Team | Time |
|---|---|---|---|
| 1 | Alberto Fernandez (ESP) | Zor–Gemeaz Cusin | 58h 55' 12" |
| 2 | Julián Gorospe (ESP) | Reynolds | + 8" |
| 3 | Bernard Hinault (FRA) | Renault–Elf | + 1' 56" |
| 4 | Marino Lejarreta (ESP) | Alfa Lum–Olmo | + 2' 00" |
| 5 | Hennie Kuiper (NED) | Jacky Aernoudt–Rossin–Campagnolo | + 4' 20" |
| 6 | Antonio Coll (ESP) | Teka | s.t. |
| 7 | Pedro Muñoz Machín Rodríguez (ESP) | Zor–Gemeaz Cusin | + 4' 27" |
| 8 | Faustino Rupérez (ESP) | Zor–Gemeaz Cusin | + 5' 41" |
| 9 | Álvaro Pino (ESP) | Zor–Gemeaz Cusin | + 6' 20" |
| 10 | Reimund Dietzen (FRG) | Teka | + 6' 54" |

== Stage 13 ==
2 May 1983 — Aguilar de Campoo to Lakes of Covadonga, 188 km (117 mi)

Stage 13 result

| Rank | Rider | Team | Time |
|---|---|---|---|
| 1 | Marino Lejarreta (ESP) | Alfa Lum–Olmo | 5h 45' 17" |
| 2 | Bernard Hinault (FRA) | Renault–Elf | + 1' 11" |
| 3 | Alberto Fernandez (ESP) | Zor–Gemeaz Cusin | + 1' 15" |
| 4 | Julián Gorospe (ESP) | Reynolds | s.t. |
| 5 | Pedro Muñoz Machín Rodríguez (ESP) | Zor–Gemeaz Cusin | s.t. |
| 6 | Carlos Machín Rodríguez (ESP) | Hueso | + 1' 40" |
| 7 | Guillermo De La Peña (ESP) | Hueso | + 2' 05" |
| 8 | Giuseppe Saronni (ITA) | Del Tongo–Colnago | + 2' 14" |
| 9 | Reimund Dietzen (FRG) | Teka | + 2' 15" |
| 10 | Álvaro Pino (ESP) | Zor–Gemeaz Cusin | + 2' 18" |

General classification after Stage 13

| Rank | Rider | Team | Time |
|---|---|---|---|
| 1 | Alberto Fernandez (ESP) | Zor–Gemeaz Cusin | 64h 41' 44" |
| 2 | Julián Gorospe (ESP) | Reynolds | + 8" |
| 3 | Marino Lejarreta (ESP) | Alfa Lum–Olmo | + 45" |
| 4 | Bernard Hinault (FRA) | Renault–Elf | + 1' 52" |
| 5 | Pedro Muñoz Machín Rodríguez (ESP) | Zor–Gemeaz Cusin | + 4' 27" |
| 6 | Hennie Kuiper (NED) | Jacky Aernoudt–Rossin–Campagnolo | + 6' 42" |
| 7 | Álvaro Pino (ESP) | Zor–Gemeaz Cusin | + 7' 23" |
| 8 | Faustino Rupérez (ESP) | Zor–Gemeaz Cusin | s.t. |
| 9 | Reimund Dietzen (FRG) | Teka | + 7' 54" |
| 10 | Laurent Fignon (FRA) | Renault–Elf | + 8' 37" |

== Stage 14 ==
3 May 1983 — Cangas de Onís to León, 195 km (121 mi)

Stage 14 result

| Rank | Rider | Team | Time |
|---|---|---|---|
| 1 | Carlos Hernández Bailo (ESP) | Reynolds | 5h 10' 03" |
| 2 | Martial Gayant (FRA) | Renault–Elf | s.t. |
| 3 | Leonardo Natale (ITA) | Del Tongo–Colnago | s.t. |
| 4 | José Recio (ESP) | Kelme | s.t. |
| 5 | Eduardo Chozas (ESP) | Zor–Gemeaz Cusin | s.t. |
| 6 | Álvaro Pino (ESP) | Zor–Gemeaz Cusin | + 5" |
| 7 | Celestino Prieto (ESP) | Reynolds | + 4' 33" |
| 8 | Jesús Blanco Villar (ESP) | Teka | s.t. |
| 9 | Maurice Le Guilloux (FRA) | Renault–Elf | s.t. |
| 10 | Fiorenzo Aliverti (ITA) | Alfa Lum–Olmo | s.t. |

General classification after Stage 14

| Rank | Rider | Team | Time |
|---|---|---|---|
| 1 | Álvaro Pino (ESP) | Zor–Gemeaz Cusin | 69h 59' 15" |
| 2 | Alberto Fernandez (ESP) | Zor–Gemeaz Cusin | + 35" |
| 3 | Julián Gorospe (ESP) | Reynolds | + 43" |
| 4 | Marino Lejarreta (ESP) | Alfa Lum–Olmo | + 1' 20" |
| 5 | Bernard Hinault (FRA) | Renault–Elf | + 1' 59" |
| 6 | Eduardo Chozas (ESP) | Zor–Gemeaz Cusin | + 2' 21" |
| 7 | Pedro Muñoz Machín Rodríguez (ESP) | Zor–Gemeaz Cusin | + 5' 37" |
| 8 | Hennie Kuiper (NED) | Jacky Aernoudt–Rossin–Campagnolo | + 7' 53" |
| 9 | Faustino Rupérez (ESP) | Zor–Gemeaz Cusin | + 8' 35" |
| 10 | Laurent Fignon (FRA) | Renault–Elf | + 9' 12" |

== Stage 15a ==
4 May 1983 — León to Valladolid, 134 km (83 mi)

Stage 15a result

| Rank | Rider | Team | Time |
|---|---|---|---|
| 1 | Pascal Poisson (FRA) | Renault–Elf | 4h 02' 12" |
| 2 | Greg LeMond (USA) | Renault–Elf | s.t. |
| 3 | Giuseppe Saronni (ITA) | Del Tongo–Colnago | + 23" |
| 4 | Eric Vanderaerden (BEL) | Jacky Aernoudt–Rossin–Campagnolo | s.t. |
| 5 | Bernard Hinault (FRA) | Renault–Elf | s.t. |
| 6 | Jesús Suárez Cueva (ESP) | Hueso | s.t. |
| 7 | Sabino Angoitia (ESP) | Hueso | s.t. |
| 8 | Henri Manders (NED) | Jacky Aernoudt–Rossin–Campagnolo | s.t. |
| 9 | Marino Lejarreta (ESP) | Alfa Lum–Olmo | s.t. |
| 10 | Salvatore Maccali (ITA) | Alfa Lum–Olmo | s.t. |

General classification after Stage 15a

| Rank | Rider | Team | Time |
|---|---|---|---|
| 1 | Álvaro Pino (ESP) | Zor–Gemeaz Cusin | 69h 59' 15" |
| 2 | Alberto Fernandez (ESP) | Zor–Gemeaz Cusin | + 35" |
| 3 | Julián Gorospe (ESP) | Reynolds | + 43" |

== Stage 15b ==
4 May 1983 — Valladolid to Valladolid, 22 km (14 mi) (ITT)

Stage 15b result

| Rank | Rider | Team | Time |
|---|---|---|---|
| 1 | Bernard Hinault (FRA) | Renault–Elf | 27' 06" |
| 2 | Julián Gorospe (ESP) | Reynolds | + 10" |
| 3 | Eric Vanderaerden (BEL) | Jacky Aernoudt–Rossin–Campagnolo | + 48" |
| 4 | Michael Wilson (AUS) | Alfa Lum–Olmo | + 1' 03" |
| 5 | Faustino Rupérez (ESP) | Zor–Gemeaz Cusin | + 1' 07" |
| 6 | Álvaro Pino (ESP) | Zor–Gemeaz Cusin | + 1' 15" |
| 7 | Alberto Fernandez (ESP) | Zor–Gemeaz Cusin | + 1' 24" |
| 8 | Hennie Kuiper (NED) | Jacky Aernoudt–Rossin–Campagnolo | + 1' 28" |
| 9 | Eduardo Chozas (ESP) | Zor–Gemeaz Cusin | + 1' 33" |
| 10 | Laurent Fignon (FRA) | Renault–Elf | + 1' 41" |

General classification after Stage 15b

| Rank | Rider | Team | Time |
|---|---|---|---|
| 1 | Julián Gorospe (ESP) | Reynolds | 74h 29' 44" |
| 2 | Álvaro Pino (ESP) | Zor–Gemeaz Cusin | + 27" |
| 3 | Bernard Hinault (FRA) | Renault–Elf | + 1' 11" |
| 4 | Alberto Fernandez (ESP) | Zor–Gemeaz Cusin | s.t. |
| 5 | Marino Lejarreta (ESP) | Alfa Lum–Olmo | + 2' 23" |
| 6 | Eduardo Chozas (ESP) | Zor–Gemeaz Cusin | + 3' 06" |
| 7 | Pedro Muñoz Machín Rodríguez (ESP) | Zor–Gemeaz Cusin | + 7' 23" |
| 8 | Hennie Kuiper (NED) | Jacky Aernoudt–Rossin–Campagnolo | + 8' 32" |
| 9 | Faustino Rupérez (ESP) | Zor–Gemeaz Cusin | + 8' 54" |
| 10 | Laurent Fignon (FRA) | Renault–Elf | + 10' 05" |

== Stage 16 ==
5 May 1983 — Valladolid to Salamanca, 162 km (101 mi)

Stage 16 result

| Rank | Rider | Team | Time |
|---|---|---|---|
| 1 | José Luis Laguía (ESP) | Reynolds | 4h 48' 37" |
| 2 | Roberto Ceruti (ITA) | Del Tongo–Colnago | s.t. |
| 3 | Laurent Fignon (FRA) | Renault–Elf | s.t. |
| 4 | René Martens (BEL) | Jacky Aernoudt–Rossin–Campagnolo | s.t. |
| 5 | Guido Van Calster (BEL) | Del Tongo–Colnago | s.t. |
| 6 | José Recio (ESP) | Kelme | s.t. |
| 7 | Dietrich Thurau (FRG) | Del Tongo–Colnago | s.t. |
| 8 | Mariano Sánchez Martinez (ESP) | Kelme | s.t. |
| 9 | Jesús Hernández Úbeda (ESP) | Reynolds | + 5" |
| 10 | Eric Vanderaerden (BEL) | Jacky Aernoudt–Rossin–Campagnolo | + 9" |

General classification after Stage 16

| Rank | Rider | Team | Time |
|---|---|---|---|
| 1 | Julián Gorospe (ESP) | Reynolds | 79h 18' 49" |
| 2 | Álvaro Pino (ESP) | Zor–Gemeaz Cusin | + 20" |
| 3 | Bernard Hinault (FRA) | Renault–Elf | + 1' 04" |
| 4 | Alberto Fernandez (ESP) | Zor–Gemeaz Cusin | s.t. |
| 5 | Marino Lejarreta (ESP) | Alfa Lum–Olmo | + 2' 16" |
| 6 | Eduardo Chozas (ESP) | Zor–Gemeaz Cusin | + 2' 59" |
| 7 | Pedro Muñoz Machín Rodríguez (ESP) | Zor–Gemeaz Cusin | + 7' 16" |
| 8 | Hennie Kuiper (NED) | Jacky Aernoudt–Rossin–Campagnolo | + 8' 25" |
| 9 | Faustino Rupérez (ESP) | Zor–Gemeaz Cusin | + 8' 47" |
| 10 | Laurent Fignon (FRA) | Renault–Elf | + 9' 37" |

== Stage 17 ==
6 May 1983 — Salamanca to Ávila, 216 km (134 mi)

Stage 17 result

| Rank | Rider | Team | Time |
|---|---|---|---|
| 1 | Bernard Hinault (FRA) | Renault–Elf | 5h 57' 03" |
| 2 | Marino Lejarreta (ESP) | Alfa Lum–Olmo | s.t. |
| 3 | Vicente Belda (ESP) | Kelme | s.t. |
| 4 | Laurent Fignon (FRA) | Renault–Elf | + 3' 05" |
| 5 | Hennie Kuiper (NED) | Jacky Aernoudt–Rossin–Campagnolo | s.t. |
| 6 | Guy Nulens (BEL) | Jacky Aernoudt–Rossin–Campagnolo | s.t. |
| 7 | Alberto Fernandez (ESP) | Zor–Gemeaz Cusin | + 3' 58" |
| 8 | Guillermo De La Peña (ESP) | Hueso | s.t. |
| 9 | Claudio Bortolotto (ITA) | Del Tongo–Colnago | + 5' 09" |
| 10 | Leonardo Natale (ITA) | Del Tongo–Colnago | s.t. |

General classification after Stage 17

| Rank | Rider | Team | Time |
|---|---|---|---|
| 1 | Bernard Hinault (FRA) | Renault–Elf | 85h 16' 56" |
| 2 | Marino Lejarreta (ESP) | Alfa Lum–Olmo | + 1' 12" |
| 3 | Alberto Fernandez (ESP) | Zor–Gemeaz Cusin | + 3' 58" |
| 4 | Álvaro Pino (ESP) | Zor–Gemeaz Cusin | + 5' 09" |
| 5 | Hennie Kuiper (NED) | Jacky Aernoudt–Rossin–Campagnolo | + 10' 26" |
| 6 | Eduardo Chozas (ESP) | Zor–Gemeaz Cusin | + 11' 15" |
| 7 | Laurent Fignon (FRA) | Renault–Elf | + 11' 38" |
| 8 | Pedro Muñoz Machín Rodríguez (ESP) | Zor–Gemeaz Cusin | + 12' 05" |
| 9 | Vicente Belda (ESP) | Kelme | + 13' 08" |
| 10 | Faustino Rupérez (ESP) | Zor–Gemeaz Cusin | + 13' 36" |

== Stage 18 ==
7 May 1983 — Ávila to Palazuelos de Eresma (Destilerías DYC), 204 km (127 mi)

Stage 18 result

| Rank | Rider | Team | Time |
|---|---|---|---|
| 1 | Jesús Hernández Úbeda (ESP) | Reynolds | 5h 54' 18" |
| 2 | Laurent Fignon (FRA) | Renault–Elf | + 8' 38" |
| 3 | Eduardo Chozas (ESP) | Zor–Gemeaz Cusin | s.t. |
| 4 | José Recio (ESP) | Kelme | + 8' 42" |
| 5 | José Luis Laguía (ESP) | Reynolds | s.t. |
| 6 | Marino Lejarreta (ESP) | Alfa Lum–Olmo | s.t. |
| 7 | Vicente Belda (ESP) | Kelme | s.t. |
| 8 | Pedro Delgado (ESP) | Reynolds | s.t. |
| 9 | Hennie Kuiper (NED) | Jacky Aernoudt–Rossin–Campagnolo | s.t. |
| 10 | Guy Nulens (BEL) | Jacky Aernoudt–Rossin–Campagnolo | s.t. |

General classification after Stage 18

| Rank | Rider | Team | Time |
|---|---|---|---|
| 1 | Bernard Hinault (FRA) | Renault–Elf | 91h 19' 53" |
| 2 | Marino Lejarreta (ESP) | Alfa Lum–Olmo | + 1' 15" |
| 3 | Alberto Fernandez (ESP) | Zor–Gemeaz Cusin | + 4' 01" |
| 4 | Álvaro Pino (ESP) | Zor–Gemeaz Cusin | + 5' 12" |
| 5 | Hennie Kuiper (NED) | Jacky Aernoudt–Rossin–Campagnolo | + 10' 29" |
| 6 | Eduardo Chozas (ESP) | Zor–Gemeaz Cusin | + 11' 14" |
| 7 | Laurent Fignon (FRA) | Renault–Elf | + 11' 37" |
| 8 | Pedro Muñoz Machín Rodríguez (ESP) | Zor–Gemeaz Cusin | + 12' 08" |
| 9 | Vicente Belda (ESP) | Kelme | + 13' 01" |
| 10 | Faustino Rupérez (ESP) | Zor–Gemeaz Cusin | + 13' 39" |

== Stage 19 ==
8 May 1983 — Palazuelos de Eresma (Destilerías DYC) – Madrid, 135 km (84 mi)

Stage 19 result

| Rank | Rider | Team | Time |
|---|---|---|---|
| 1 | Michael Wilson (AUS) | Alfa Lum–Olmo | 3h 08' 10" |
| 2 | Laurent Fignon (FRA) | Renault–Elf | + 13" |
| 3 | José Luis Laguía (ESP) | Reynolds | + 20" |
| 4 | Jesús Suárez Cueva (ESP) | Hueso | s.t. |
| 5 | Sabino Angoitia (ESP) | Hueso | s.t. |
| 6 | Henri Manders (NED) | Jacky Aernoudt–Rossin–Campagnolo | s.t. |
| 7 | Claudio Bortolotto (ITA) | Del Tongo–Colnago | s.t. |
| 8 | Federico Echave (ESP) | Teka | s.t. |
| 9 | Pascal Poisson (FRA) | Renault–Elf | s.t. |
| 10 | Salvatore Maccali (ITA) | Alfa Lum–Olmo | s.t. |

General classification after Stage 19

| Rank | Rider | Team | Time |
|---|---|---|---|
| 1 | Bernard Hinault (FRA) | Renault–Elf | 94h 28' 26" |
| 2 | Marino Lejarreta (ESP) | Alfa Lum–Olmo | + 1' 12" |
| 3 | Alberto Fernandez (ESP) | Zor–Gemeaz Cusin | + 3' 58" |
| 4 | Álvaro Pino (ESP) | Zor–Gemeaz Cusin | + 5' 09" |
| 5 | Hennie Kuiper (NED) | Jacky Aernoudt–Rossin–Campagnolo | + 10' 26" |
| 6 | Eduardo Chozas (ESP) | Zor–Gemeaz Cusin | + 11' 11" |
| 7 | Laurent Fignon (FRA) | Renault–Elf | + 11' 27" |
| 8 | Pedro Muñoz Machín Rodríguez (ESP) | Zor–Gemeaz Cusin | + 12' 25" |
| 9 | Vicente Belda (ESP) | Kelme | + 13' 08" |
| 10 | Faustino Rupérez (ESP) | Zor–Gemeaz Cusin | + 13' 36" |
