= 1981 Giro d'Italia =

Race details
- Dates: 13 May – 7 June 1981
- Stages: 22 + Prologue, including one split stage
- Distance: 3,895.6 km (2,421 mi)
- Winning time: 104h 50' 36"

Results
Jersey awarded to the overall winner	Winner	Giovanni Battaglin (ITA)	(Inoxpran)
	Second	Tommy Prim (SWE)	(Bianchi-Piaggio)
	Third	Giuseppe Saronni (ITA)	(Gis Gelati-Campagnolo)
Jersey awarded to the points classification winner	Points	Giuseppe Saronni (ITA)	(Gis Gelati-Campagnolo)
Jersey awarded to the mountains classification winner	Mountains	Claudio Bortolotto (ITA)	(Santini)
Jersey awarded to the youth classification winner	Youth	Giuseppe Faraca (ITA)	(Hoonved-Bottecchia)
	Team	Bianchi-Piaggio	
	Team points	Bianchi-Piaggio	

The 1981 Giro d'Italia was the 64th running of the Giro. It started in Brescia, on 13 May, with a 6.6 km (4.1 mi) prologue and concluded in Verona, on 7 June, with a 42 km (26.1 mi) individual time trial. A total of 130 riders from thirteen teams entered the 22-stage race, that was won by Italian Giovanni Battaglin of the Inoxpran team. The second and third places were taken by Swede Tommy Prim and Italian Giuseppe Saronni, respectively.

Amongst the other classifications that the race awarded, Gis Gelati-Campagnolo's Saronni won the points classification, Claudio Bortolotto of Santini-Selle Italia won the mountains classification, and Hoonved-Bottecchia's Giuseppe Faraca completed the Giro as the best neo-professional in the general classification, finishing eleventh overall. Bianchi-Piaggio finishing as the winners of the team classification, ranking each of the twenty teams contesting the race by lowest cumulative time. In addition, Bianchi-Piaggio won the team points classification.

== Teams ==
A total of thirteen teams were invited to participate in the 1981 Giro d'Italia. The starting riders came from a total of 11 different countries; Italy (82), Switzerland (11), Belgium (11), and Spain (10) all had 10 or more riders represented. Each team sent a squad of ten riders, which meant that the race started with a peloton of 130 cyclists.

Of those starting, 45 were riding the Giro d'Italia for the first time. The average age of riders was 25.76 years, ranging from 20–year–old Moreno Argentin (Sammontana-Benotto) to 35–year–old Wladimiro Panizza (Gis Gelati-Campagnolo). The team with the youngest average rider age was Hoonved-Bottecchia (23), while the oldest was Gis Gelati-Campagnolo (27). From the riders that began this edition, 104 made it to the finish in Verona.

The teams entering the race were:

- Bianchi-Piaggio
- Cilo-Aufina
- Famcucine–Campagnolo
- Gemeaz Cusin-Zor-Helios
- Gis Gelati-Campagnolo
- Hoonved-Bottecchia
- Inoxpran
- Kotter's-G.B.C.
- Magniflex-Olmo
- Safir-Galli-Maillard
- Sammontana-Benotto
- Santini-Selle Italia
- Selle San Marco-Gabrielli

== Route and stages ==
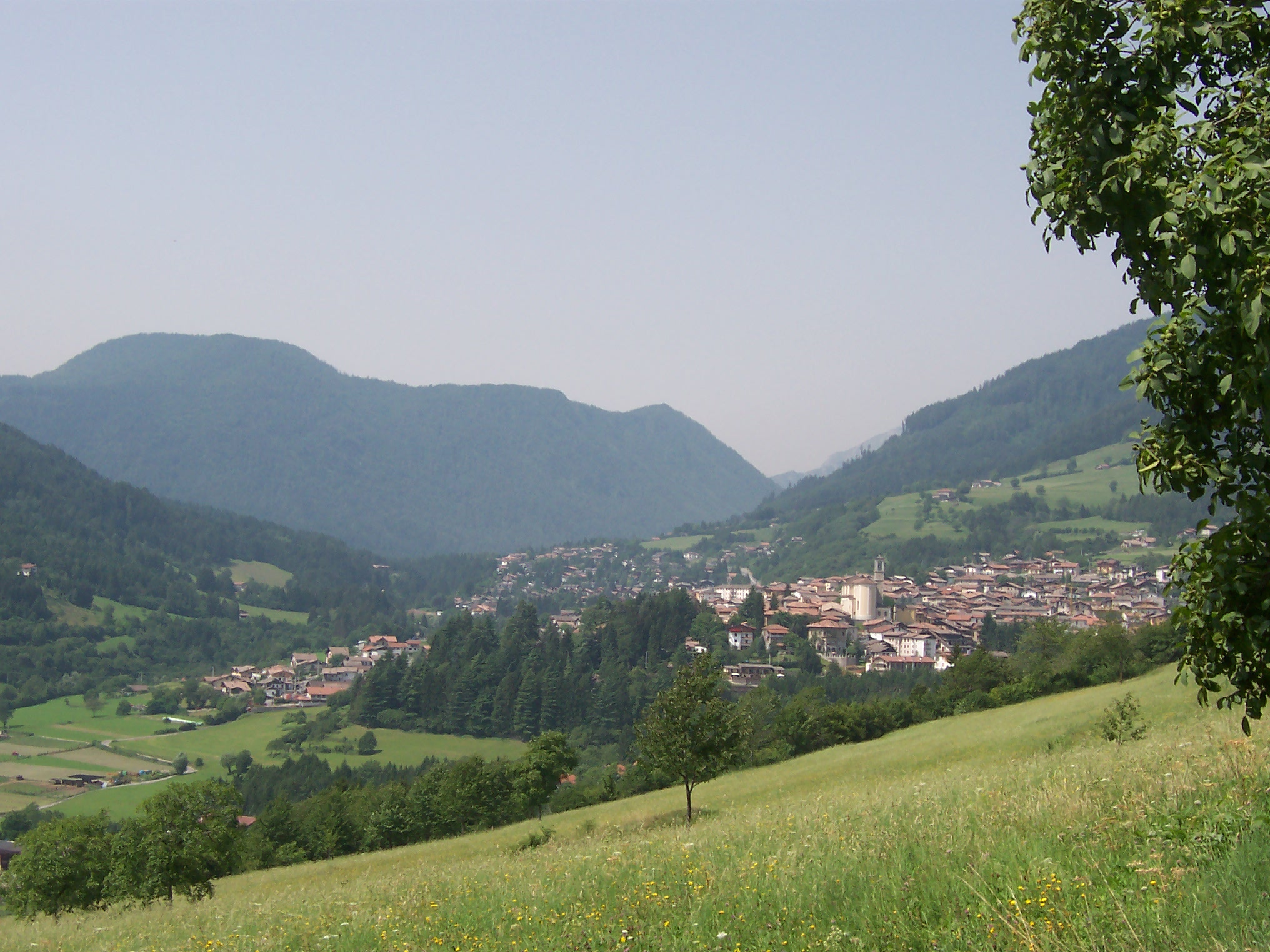
Borno hosted the end of the 215 km (134 mi) seventeenth stage.

The route for the 1981 edition of the Giro d'Italia was revealed to the public by head organizer Vincenzo Torriani on 21 February 1981. Covering a total of 3,895.6 km (2,420.6 mi), it included four time trials (three individual and one for teams), and ten stages with categorized climbs that awarded mountains classification points. Two of these ten stages had summit finishes: stage 17, to Borno; and stage 20, to Tre Cime di Lavaredo. The organizers chose to include three rest days.

When compared to the previous year's race, the race was 129.4 km (80 mi) shorter and contained one more time trial. In addition, this race contained one more set of split stages.

It was the first time in the history of the Giro that the Giro ended in Verona. The team time trial in stage 1 was the first team time trial in the Giro d'Italia since 1956.

Stage characteristics and winners
Stage	Date	Course	Distance	Type	Winner
P	13 May	Trieste	6.6 km (4 mi)	Individual time trial	Knut Knudsen (NOR)
1a	14 May	Trieste to Bibione	100 km (62 mi)	Plain stage	Guido Bontempi (ITA)
1b	14 May	Lignano Sabbiadoro to Bibione	15 km (9 mi)	Team time trial	Hoonved-Bottecchia
2	15 May	Bibione to Ferrara	211 km (131 mi)	Plain stage	Paolo Rosola (ITA)
3	16 May	Bologna to Recanati	255 km (158 mi)	Plain stage	Giuseppe Saronni (ITA)
	17 May	Rest day			
4	18 May	Recanati to Lanciano	214 km (133 mi)	Plain stage	Mario Beccia (ITA)
5	19 May	Marina di San Vito to Rodi Garganico	180 km (112 mi)	Plain stage	Giuseppe Saronni (ITA)
6	20 May	Rodi Garganico to Bari	225 km (140 mi)	Plain stage	Giuseppe Saronni (ITA)
7	21 May	Bari to Potenza	143 km (89 mi)	Stage with mountain(s)	Palmiro Masciarelli (ITA)
8	22 May	Sala Consilina to Cosenza	202 km (126 mi)	Stage with mountain(s)	Moreno Argentin (ITA)
9	23 May	Cosenza to Reggio Calabria	231 km (144 mi)	Stage with mountain(s)	Serge Parsani (ITA)
	24 May	Rest day			
10	25 May	Rome to Cascia	166 km (103 mi)	Stage with mountain(s)	Gianbattista Baronchelli (ITA)
11	26 May	Cascia to Arezzo	199 km (124 mi)	Plain stage	Giovanni Renosto (ITA)
12	27 May	Arezzo to Livorno Montenero	224 km (139 mi)	Plain stage	Moreno Argentin (ITA)
13	28 May	Empoli to Montecatini Terme	35 km (22 mi)	Individual time trial	Knut Knudsen (NOR)
14	29 May	Montecatini Terme to Salsomaggiore Terme	224 km (139 mi)	Stage with mountain(s)	Francesco Moser (ITA)
15	30 May	Salsomaggiore Terme to Pavia	198 km (123 mi)	Stage with mountain(s)	Daniel Gisiger (SUI)
16	31 May	Milan to Mantua	178 km (111 mi)	Plain stage	Claudio Torelli (ITA)
17	1 June	Mantua to Borno	215 km (134 mi)	Stage with mountain(s)	Benedetto Patellaro (ITA)
18	2 June	Borno to Dimaro	127 km (79 mi)	Stage with mountain(s)	Miguel María Lasa (ESP)
	3 June	Rest day			
19	4 June	Dimaro to San Vigilio di Marebbe	208 km (129 mi)	Stage with mountain(s)	Giovanni Battaglin (ITA)
20	5 June	San Vigilio di Marebbe to Tre Cime di Lavaredo	100 km (62 mi)	Stage with mountain(s)	Beat Breu (SUI)
21	6 June	Auronzo di Cadore to Arzignano	197 km (122 mi)	Plain stage	Pierino Gavazzi (ITA)
22	7 June	Soave to Verona	42 km (26 mi)	Individual time trial	Knut Knudsen (NOR)
	Total		3,895.6 km (2,421 mi)		

== Classification leadership ==
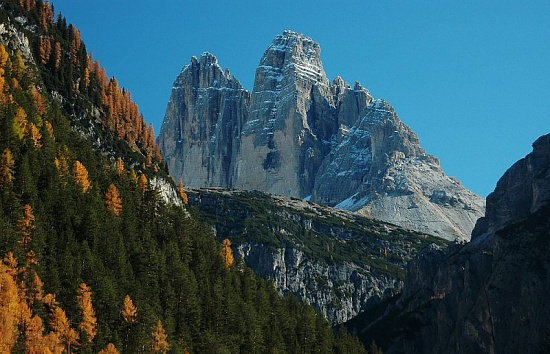
The Tre Cime di Lavaredo was the Cima Coppi for the 1981 running of the Giro d'Italia.

Three different jerseys were worn during the 1981 Giro d'Italia. The leader of the general classification – calculated by adding the stage finish times of each rider, and allowing time bonuses for the first three finishers on mass-start stages – wore a pink jersey. The time bonuses for the 1981 Giro were thirty seconds for first, twenty seconds for second, and ten seconds for third place on the stage. This classification is the most important of the race, and its winner is considered as the winner of the Giro.

For the points classification, which awarded a purple (or cyclamen) jersey to its leader, cyclists were given points for finishing a stage in the top 15.

The green jersey was awarded to the mountains classification leader. In this ranking, points were won by reaching the summit of a climb ahead of other cyclists. Each climb was ranked as either first, second or third category, with more points available for higher category climbs. The Cima Coppi, the race's highest point of elevation, awarded more points than the other first category climbs. The Cima Coppi for this Giro was the Tre Cime di Lavaredo. The first rider to cross the Tre Cime di Lavaredo was Swiss rider Beat Breu.

The white jersey was worn by the leader of young rider classification, a ranking decided the same way as the general classification, but considering only neo-professional cyclists (in their first three years of professional racing).

Although no jersey was awarded, there was also one classification for the teams, in which the stage finish times of the best three cyclists per team were added; the leading team was the one with the lowest total time. There was another team classification that awarded points to each team based on their riding's finishing position in every stage. The team with the highest total of points was the leader of the classification.

There was also a secondary team classification, based on points.

In 1981, the campionate delle regioni and FIAT sprints were combined into one classification, also sponsored by FIAT, for which the leader wore the light-blue jersey that was previously worn by the leader of the campionate delle regioni classification.

The rows in the following table correspond to the jerseys awarded after that stage was run.

Classification leadership by stage
Stage	Winner	General classification	Points classification	Mountains classification	Young rider classification	FIAT	Team classification
P	Knut Knudsen	Knut Knudsen	Knut Knudsen	not awarded	?	not awarded	not awarded
1a	Guido Bontempi	Guido Bontempi	Giovanni Mantovani	not awarded	Guido Bontempi	Dante Morandi	not awarded
1b	Hoonved-Bottecchia	Francesco Moser	Giovanni Mantovani	not awarded	Guido Bontempi	Dante Morandi	Hoonved-Bottecchia
2	Paolo Rosola	Gregor Braun	Giovanni Mantovani	not awarded	Guido Bontempi	Dante Morandi	Famcucine-Campagnolo
3	Giuseppe Saronni	Francesco Moser	Giovanni Mantovani	not awarded	Giuseppe Faraca	Dante Morandi	Famcucine-Campagnolo
4	Mario Beccia	Francesco Moser	Giovanni Mantovani	not awarded	Giuseppe Faraca	Paolo Rosola	Hoonved-Bottecchia
5	Giuseppe Saronni	Francesco Moser	Giuseppe Saronni	not awarded	Fiorenzo Aliverti	Paolo Rosola	Famcucine-Campagnolo
6	Giuseppe Saronni	Giuseppe Saronni	Giuseppe Saronni	not awarded	Fiorenzo Aliverti	Paolo Rosola	Famcucine-Campagnolo
7	Palmiro Masciarelli	Giuseppe Saronni	Giuseppe Saronni	Beat Breu	Fiorenzo Aliverti	Paolo Rosola	Famcucine-Campagnolo
8	Moreno Argentin	Giuseppe Saronni	Giuseppe Saronni	Bruno Wolfer	Fiorenzo Aliverti	Paolo Rosola	Famcucine-Campagnolo
9	Serge Parsani	Giuseppe Saronni	Giuseppe Saronni	Claudio Bortolotto	Fiorenzo Aliverti	Paolo Rosola	Famcucine-Campagnolo
10	Gianbattista Baronchelli	Giuseppe Saronni	Giuseppe Saronni	Claudio Bortolotto	Giuseppe Faraca	Paolo Rosola	Bianchi-Piaggio
11	Giovanni Renosto	Giuseppe Saronni	Giuseppe Saronni	Claudio Bortolotto	Giuseppe Faraca	Paolo Rosola	Bianchi-Piaggio
12	Moreno Argentin	Giuseppe Saronni	Giuseppe Saronni	Claudio Bortolotto	Giuseppe Faraca	Paolo Rosola	Bianchi-Piaggio
13	Knut Knudsen	Roberto Visentini	Giuseppe Saronni	Claudio Bortolotto	Giuseppe Faraca	Paolo Rosola	Bianchi-Piaggio
14	Francesco Moser	Silvano Contini	Giuseppe Saronni	Claudio Bortolotto	Giuseppe Faraca	Paolo Rosola	Bianchi-Piaggio
15	Daniel Gisiger	Silvano Contini	Giuseppe Saronni	Claudio Bortolotto	Giuseppe Faraca	Paolo Rosola	Bianchi-Piaggio
16	Claudio Torelli	Silvano Contini	Giuseppe Saronni	Claudio Bortolotto	Giuseppe Faraca	Paolo Rosola	Bianchi-Piaggio
17	Benedetto Patellaro	Silvano Contini	Giuseppe Saronni	Claudio Bortolotto	Giuseppe Faraca	Paolo Rosola	Bianchi-Piaggio
18	Miguel María Lasa	Silvano Contini	Giuseppe Saronni	Claudio Bortolotto	Giuseppe Faraca	Paolo Rosola	Bianchi-Piaggio
19	Giovanni Battaglin	Silvano Contini	Giuseppe Saronni	Claudio Bortolotto	Giuseppe Faraca	Paolo Rosola	Bianchi-Piaggio
20	Beat Breu	Giovanni Battaglin	Giuseppe Saronni	Claudio Bortolotto	Giuseppe Faraca	Paolo Rosola	Bianchi-Piaggio
21	Pierino Gavazzi	Giovanni Battaglin	Giuseppe Saronni	Claudio Bortolotto	Giuseppe Faraca	Paolo Rosola	Bianchi-Piaggio
22	Knut Knudsen	Giovanni Battaglin	Giuseppe Saronni	Claudio Bortolotto	Giuseppe Faraca	Paolo Rosola	Bianchi-Piaggio
Final		Giovanni Battaglin	Giuseppe Saronni	Claudio Bortolotto	Giuseppe Faraca	Paolo Rosola	Bianchi-Piaggio

== Final standings ==
Legend
Pink jersey	Denotes the winner of the General classification
Purple jersey	Denotes the winner of the Points classification
Green jersey	Denotes the winner of the Mountains classification
Blue white	Denotes the winner of the Young rider classification
Blue jersey	Denotes the winner of the FIAT classification

=== General classification ===
Final general classification (1–10)
Rank	Name	Team	Time
1	Giovanni Battaglin (ITA)	Inoxpran	104h 50' 36"
2	Tommy Prim (SWE)	Bianchi-Piaggio	+ 38"
3	Giuseppe Saronni (ITA)	Gis Gelati-Campagnolo	+ 50"
4	Silvano Contini (ITA)	Bianchi-Piaggio	+ 1' 59"
5	Josef Fuchs (SUI)	Cilo-Aufina	+ 2' 19"
6	Roberto Visentini (ITA)	Sammontana-Benotto	+ 5' 37"
7	Alfio Vandi (ITA)	Selle San Marco-Gabrielli	+ 9' 32"
8	Beat Breu (SUI)	Cilo-Aufina	+ 10' 02"
9	Claudio Bortolotto (ITA)	Santini-Selle Italia	+ 10' 12"
10	Gianbattista Baronchelli (ITA)	Bianchi-Piaggio	+ 12' 01"

=== Points classification ===
Final points classification (1–5)
	Rider	Team	Points
1	Giuseppe Saronni (ITA)	Gis Gelati-Campagnolo	215
2	Tommy Prim (SWE)	Bianchi-Piaggio	133
3	Giovanni Mantovani (ITA)	Hoonved-Bottecchia	127
4	Francesco Moser (ITA)	Famcucine-Campagnolo	117
5	Silvano Contini (ITA)	Bianchi-Piaggio	112

=== Mountains classification ===
Final mountains classification (1–10)
	Rider	Team	Points
1	Claudio Bortolotto (ITA)	Santini-Selle Italia	510
2	Beat Breu (SUI)	Cilo-Aufina	500
3	Benedetto Patellaro (ITA)	Hoonved-Bottecchia	290
4	Giovanni Battaglin (ITA)	Inoxpran	265
5	Leonardo Natale (ITA)	Magniflex-Olmo	180
6	Josef Fuchs (SUI)	Cilo-Aufina	150
7	Mario Noris (ITA)	Magniflex-Olmo	125
8	Guillermo De La Pena (ESP)	Gemeaz Cusin-Zor-Helios	120
8	Francesco Moser (ITA)	Famcucine-Campagnolo	120
10	Alfio Vandi (ITA)	Selle San Marco-Gabrielli	115

=== Young rider classification ===
Final young rider classification (1–5)
	Rider	Team	Time
1	Giuseppe Faraca (ITA)	Hoonved-Bottecchia	105h 05' 30"
2	Alberto Minetti (ITA)	Famcucine-Campagnolo	+ 23' 51"
3	George Mount (USA)	Sammontana-Benotto	+ 25' 46"
4	Moreno Argentin (ITA)	Sammontana-Benotto	+ 46' 12"
5	Maurizio Piovani (ITA)	Gis Gelati-Campagnolo	+ 46' 40"

=== Traguardi Fiat classification ===
Final traguardi fiat classification (1–5)
	Rider	Team	Points
1	Paolo Rosola (ITA)	Magniflex-Olmo	128
2	Dante Morandi (ITA)	Famcucine-Campagnolo	70
3	Giovanni Renosto (ITA)	Magniflex-Olmo	48
4	Benny Schepmans (BEL)	Safir-Galli-Maillard	33
5	Alessio Antonini (ITA)	Santini-Selle Italia	32

=== Team classification ===
Final team classification (1–3)
	Team	Time
1	Bianchi-Piaggio	313h 55' 08"
2	Cilo-Aufina	+ 25' 01"
3	Inoxpran	+ 44' 32"

=== Team points classification ===
Final team points classification (1–3)
	Team	Points
1	Bianchi-Piaggio	189
2	Famcucine-Campagnolo	137
3	Hoonved-Bottecchia	129

== Doping ==
There were no positive doping tests in the Giro of 1981.

== Aftermath ==
With his Giro victory, Battaglin completed the Vuelta–Giro double, the second rider to achieve the feat (Eddy Merckx was the first in 1973). Only 48 days separated the Vuelta's start on 21 April from the Giro's end on 7 June.
