= 1978 Tour of Britain =

1978 Open Tour of Britain
Race details
- Dates: 7–12 August 1978
- Stages: 5 + Prologue
- Distance: 902.3 km (560.7 mi)
- Winning time: 22h 34' 42"

Results
	Winner	Johan van der Velde (NED)
	Second	Reg Smith (GBR)
	Third	Gottfried Schmutz (SUI)

The 1978 Open Tour of Britain was an edition of the Tour of Britain cycle race and was held from 7 August to 12 August 1978. The race started in Greenock and finished at the Crystal Palace circuit. The race was won by Johan van der Velde.

== General classification ==
Final general classification

Rank	Rider	Time
1	Johan van der Velde (NED)	22h 34' 42"
2	Reg Smith (GBR)	+ 6"
3	Gottfried Schmutz (SUI)	+ 6"
4	André Gevers (NED)	+ 1' 36"
5	Roland Salm (SUI)	+ 1' 39"
6	Diego Magoni (ITA)	+ 1' 47"
7	Patrick Verstraete (BEL)	+ 1' 48"
8	Jean-Philippe Vandenbrande (BEL)	+ 1' 54"
9	John McMillan (GBR)	+ 12' 08"
10	Franky De Gendt (BEL)	+ 12' 11"
