= 1983 Vuelta a España =

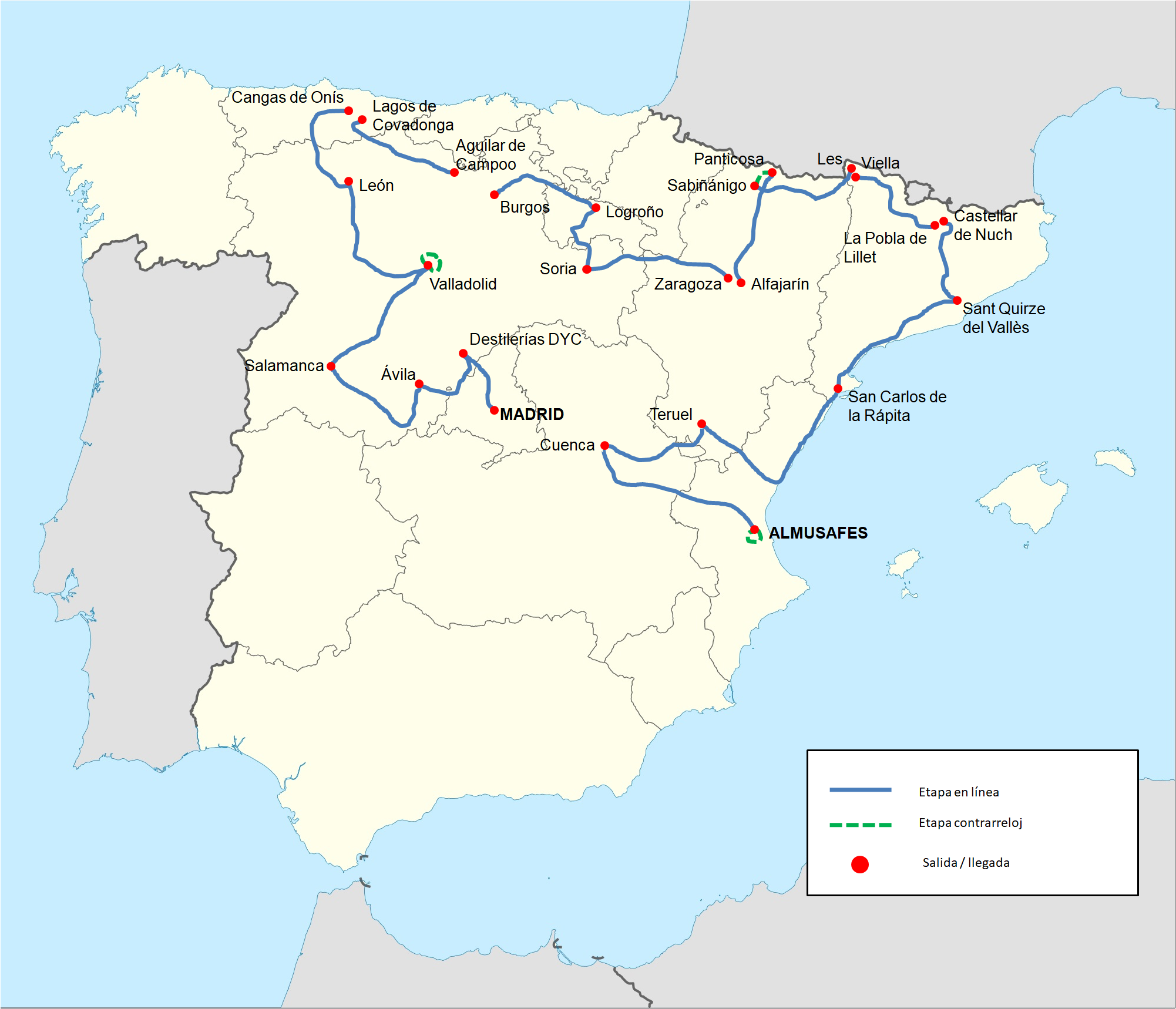
- Route map

Race details
- Dates: 19 April – 8 May
- Stages: 19 + Prologue, including 1 split stage
- Distance: 3,398 km (2,111 mi)
- Winning time: 94h 28' 26"

Results
Jersey awarded to the overall winner	Winner	Bernard Hinault (FRA)	(Renault–Elf–Gitane)
	Second	Marino Lejarreta (ESP)	(Alfa Lum–Olmo)
	Third	Alberto Fernández (ESP)	(Zor–Gemeaz)
Jersey awarded to the points classification winner	Points	Marino Lejarreta (ESP)	(AAlfa Lum–Olmo)
Jersey awarded to the mountains classification winner	Mountains	José Luis Laguía (ESP)	(Reynolds–Galli)
	Sprints	Sabino Angoitia (ESP)	(Hueso)
	Team	Zor–Gemeaz	

The 38th Vuelta a España (Tour of Spain), a long-distance bicycle stage race and one of the three grand tours, was held from 19 April to 8 May 1983. It consisted of 19 stages covering a total of 3,398 km (2,111 mi), and was won by Bernard Hinault of the Renault–Elf–Gitane cycling team. The foreign favourites for the race included Bernard Hinault who had won the Vuelta once before in 1978 and World Champion Giuseppe Saronni. The Spanish favourites for the race included the de facto defending champion Marino Lejarreta, Julián Gorospe and Alberto Fernández.

Hinault took the leadership of the race after the fifth stage only to lose it the following day to Lejarreta. Lejarreta then won the stage 8 38 km (24 mi) mountain time trial and increased his lead over Hinault. On the stage from Zaragoza to Soria that was won by Saronni, Lejarreta had a fall and lost the jersey to Gorospe. Fernández took the leadership the following day. Lejarreta came back and won the stage 13 to Lagos de Covadonga. However Fernández kept the leader's jersey. On the following stage Álvaro Pino took the jersey and wore it for two days. Hinault won the individual time trial but did not win by enough time to take the jersey which passed again to Gorospe. Two days later Hinault's pace on the climb to Puerto de Serranillos was too hot for his opponents and he won the stage in Ávila and took back the leader's jersey to win his second Vuelta and his eighth grand tour with Lejarreta second and Fernández in third. The great battle waged between Hinault and the Spanish riders has led to the 1983 race being described as its most spectacular edition. In addition to this the start list for the 1983 Renault team at the Vuelta included Hinault, Greg LeMond and Laurent Fignon, the only time they rode on the same team in a Grand Tour.

This victory proved costly for Hinault however, as due to a recurrent tendinitis issue that had developed in his knee, which he greatly aggravated on the climb to Puerto de Serranillos, Hinault was unable to ride in that year's Tour, where Fignon took over Team Renault.

== Route ==
List of stages
Stage	Date	Course	Distance	Type	Winner
P	19 April	Almussafes to Almussafes	6.8 km (4 mi)	Individual time trial	Dominique Gaigne (FRA)
1	20 April	Almussafes to Cuenca	235 km (146 mi)		Juan Fernández (ESP)
2	21 April	Cuenca to Teruel	152 km (94 mi)		Eric Vanderaerden (BEL)
3	22 April	Teruel to Sant Carles de la Ràpita	241 km (150 mi)		Giuseppe Petito (ITA)
4	23 April	Sant Carles de la Ràpita to Sant Quirze del Vallès	192 km (119 mi)		Laurent Fignon (FRA)
5	24 April	Sant Quirze del Vallès to Castellar de n'Hug	195 km (121 mi)		Alberto Fernández (ESP)
6	25 April	La Pobla de Lillet to Viella	235 km (146 mi)		Marino Lejarreta (ESP)
7	26 April	Les to Sabiñánigo	137 km (85 mi)		Jesús Suárez Cueva (ESP)
8	27 April	Sabiñánigo to Balneario de Panticosa	38 km (24 mi)	Individual time trial	Marino Lejarreta (ESP)
9	28 April	Panticosa to Alfajarín	183 km (114 mi)		Giuseppe Saronni (ITA)
10	29 April	Zaragoza to Soria	174 km (108 mi)		Giuseppe Saronni (ITA)
11	30 April	Soria to Logroño	185 km (115 mi)		Eric Vanderaerden (BEL)
12	1 May	Logroño to Burgos	147 km (91 mi)		Noël Dejonckheere (BEL)
13	2 May	Aguilar de Campoo to Lakes of Covadonga	188 km (117 mi)		Marino Lejarreta (ESP)
14	3 May	Cangas de Onís to León	195 km (121 mi)		Carlos Hernández (ESP)
15a	4 May	León to Valladolid	134 km (83 mi)		Pascal Poisson (FRA)
15b	4 May	Valladolid to Valladolid	22 km (14 mi)	Individual time trial	Bernard Hinault (FRA)
16	5 May	Valladolid to Salamanca	162 km (101 mi)		José Luis Laguía (ESP)
17	6 May	Salamanca to Ávila	216 km (134 mi)		Bernard Hinault (FRA)
18	7 May	Ávila to Palazuelos de Eresma (Destilerías DYC)	204 km (127 mi)		Jesús Hernández Úbeda (ESP)
19	8 May	Palazuelos de Eresma (Destilerías DYC) to Madrid	135 km (84 mi)		Michael Wilson (AUS)
	Total		3,398 km (2,111 mi)		

== Results ==
=== Final General Classification ===
Rank	Rider	Team	Time
1	(France) Bernard Hinault	Renault–Elf–Gitane	94h 28' 26"
2	(Spain) Marino Lejarreta	Alfa Lum–Olmo	+ 1' 12"
3	(Spain) Alberto Fernández	Zor–Gemeaz	+ 3' 58"
4	(Spain) Álvaro Pino	Zor–Gemeaz	+ 5' 09"
5	(Netherlands) Hennie Kuiper	Jacky Aernoudt–Rossin	+ 10' 26"
6	(Spain) Eduardo Chozas Olmo	Zor–Gemeaz	+ 11' 11"
7	(France) Laurent Fignon	Renault–Elf–Gitane	+ 11' 27"
8	(Spain) Pedro Muñoz Rodríguez	Zor–Gemeaz	+ 12' 25"
9	(Spain) Vicente Belda	Kelme	+ 13' 28"
10	(Spain) Faustino Rupérez	Zor–Gemeaz	+ 13' 36"
11	(Spain) Guillermo de la Peña	Hueso–Motta	
12	(Spain) Julián Gorospe	Reynolds–Galli	
13	(France) Alain Vigneron	Renault–Elf–Gitane	
14	(Italy) Claudio Bortolotto	Del Tongo–Colnago	
15	(Spain) Pedro Delgado	Reynolds–Galli	
16	(Spain) José Antonio Cabrero	Hueso–Motta	
17	(Spain) Faustino Cueli Arce	Teka	
18	(Italy) Leonardo Natale	Del Tongo–Colnago	
19	(Luxembourg) Lucien Didier	Renault–Elf–Gitane	
20	(Spain) Angel De Las Heras	Kelme	
21	(Spain) Jesús Rodríguez Magro	Zor–Gemeaz	
22	(Spain) Jesús Hernández Úbeda	Reynolds–Galli	
23	(Italy) Roberto Ceruti	Del Tongo–Colnago	
24	(Spain) José Luis Laguía	Reynolds–Galli	
25	(France) Martial Gayant	Renault–Elf–Gitane	
