= Geert Schipper =

Dutch road cyclist (1948–2025)

Personal information
- Full name: Gerard Schipper
- Born: 23 November 1948 Ter Apel, Netherlands
- Died: 12 May 2025 (aged 76) Nieuw-Weerdinge, Netherlands

Cycling career
- Sport: Cycling
- Discipline: Road cycling
Medal record
World Championships
Gold medal – first place	1982 Goodwood	Men's team time trial

Gerard "Geert" Schipper (23 November 1948 – 12 May 2025) was a Dutch road cyclist. He became world champion in the team time trial at the 1982 UCI Road World Championships together with Maarten Ducrot, Gerrit Solleveld and Frits Van Bindsbergen. He won the Olympia's Tour in 1981 and the Ronde van Noord-Holland in 1985. He died on 12 May 2025, at the age of 76.
