= Rudy Rogiers =

Belgian cyclist

Personal information
- Born: 17 February 1961 (age 65) Wetteren, Belgium

Cycling career
- Sport: Cycling
- Role: Rider

Professional teams
- 1983: Jacky Aernoudt–Rossin–Campagnolo
- 1984-: Splendor–Jacky Aernoudt Meubelen
- -1989: Hitachi–VTM
- 1990: Isoglass–Garden Wood
- 1991–1992: Tulip Computers

Rudy Rogiers (born 17 February 1961) is a Belgian former professional racing cyclist. He rode in four editions of the Tour de France, one edition of the Giro d'Italia and one edition of the Vuelta a España.
