= Giuseppe Faraca =

Italian cyclist

Personal information
- Full name: Giuseppe Faraca
- Born: 29 August 1959 Cosenza, Italy
- Died: 4 May 2016 (aged 56)

Cycling career
- Sport: Cycling
- Discipline: Road

Professional teams
- 1981–1982: Hoonved-Bottecchia
- 1983: Dromedario
- 1984: Ariostea
- 1986: Dromedario

Major wins
- Grand Tours Giro d'Italia Young rider Classification (1981)

Giuseppe Faraca (29 August 1959 – 4 May 2016) was an Italian professional cyclist. He most known for winning the Young rider Classification in the 1981 Giro d'Italia. His highest finishing in the Giro d'Italia was the year he won the Young rider classification, he placed eleventh that year. He retired from cycling in 1986.
