= Borno, Lombardy =

Borno Búren
- Comune
- Comune di Borno
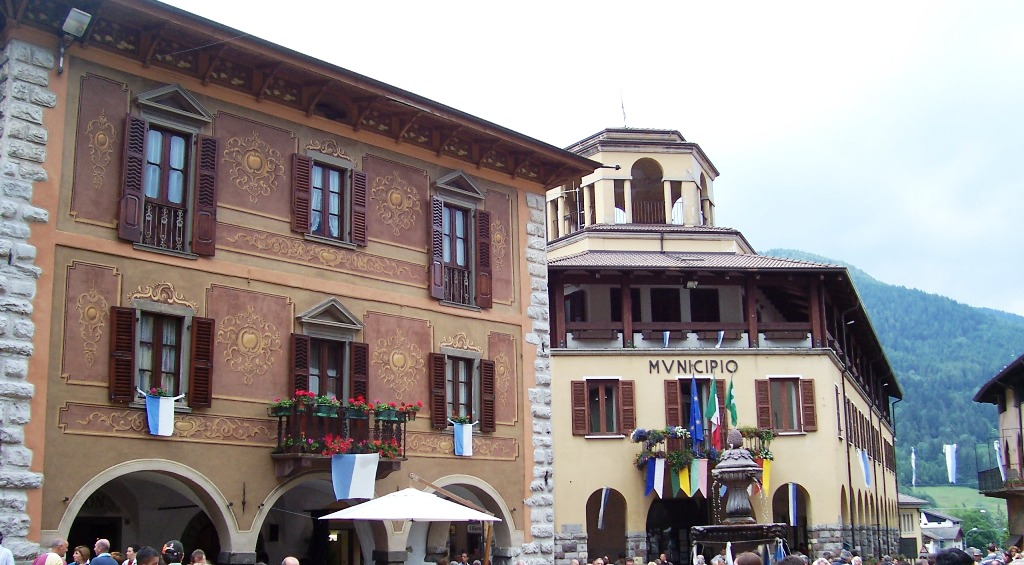
- Town Centre

- Coat of arms

- Location within Italy Location within Lombardy
- Coordinates: 45°56′46″N 10°11′56″E
- Country: Italy
- Region: Lombardy
- Province: Brescia (BS)
- Frazioni: Paline

Government
  - Mayor: Matteo Rivadossi (SiAmo Borno (non political))

Area
  - Total: 30 km^{2} (12 sq mi)
- Elevation: 912 m (2,992 ft)

Population (2017)
  - Total: 26,060
  - Density: 870/km^{2} (2,200/sq mi)
- Demonym: Bornesi
- Time zone: UTC+1 (CET)
  - Summer (DST): UTC+2 (CEST)
- Postal code: 20142
- Dialing code: 0364
- Patron saint: St. John the Baptist
- Saint day: 24 June
- Website: Official website

Borno (Camunian: Búren) is an Italian comune in Val Camonica, province of Brescia, in Lombardy.

== Main sights ==
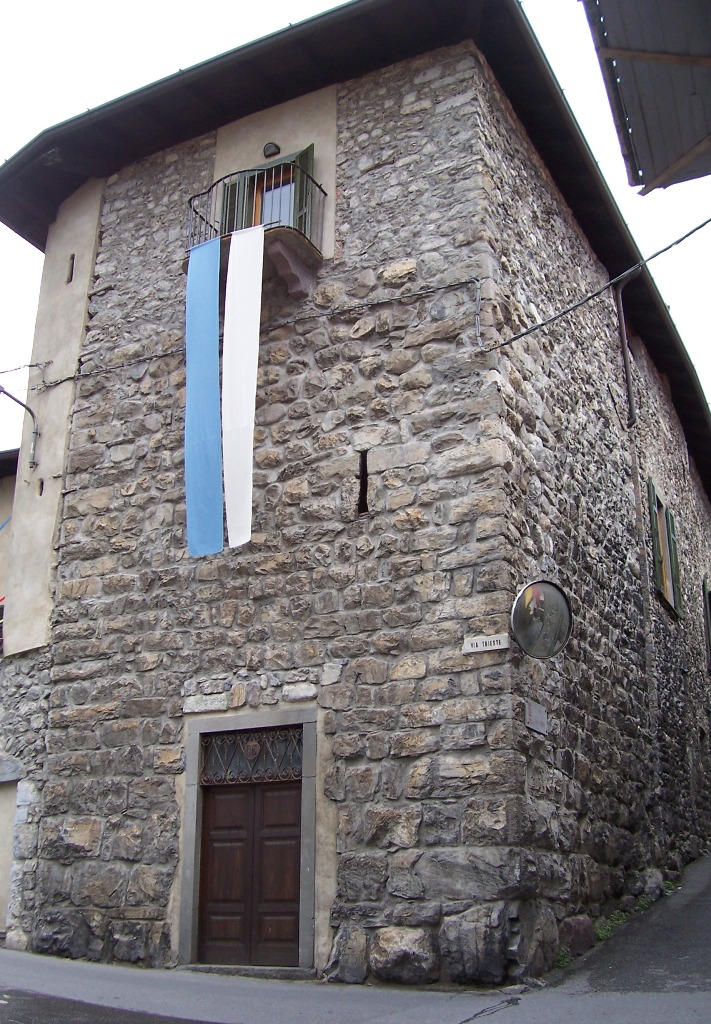
Housetower in Borno. Benito Mussolini lived there from 1901 to 1903

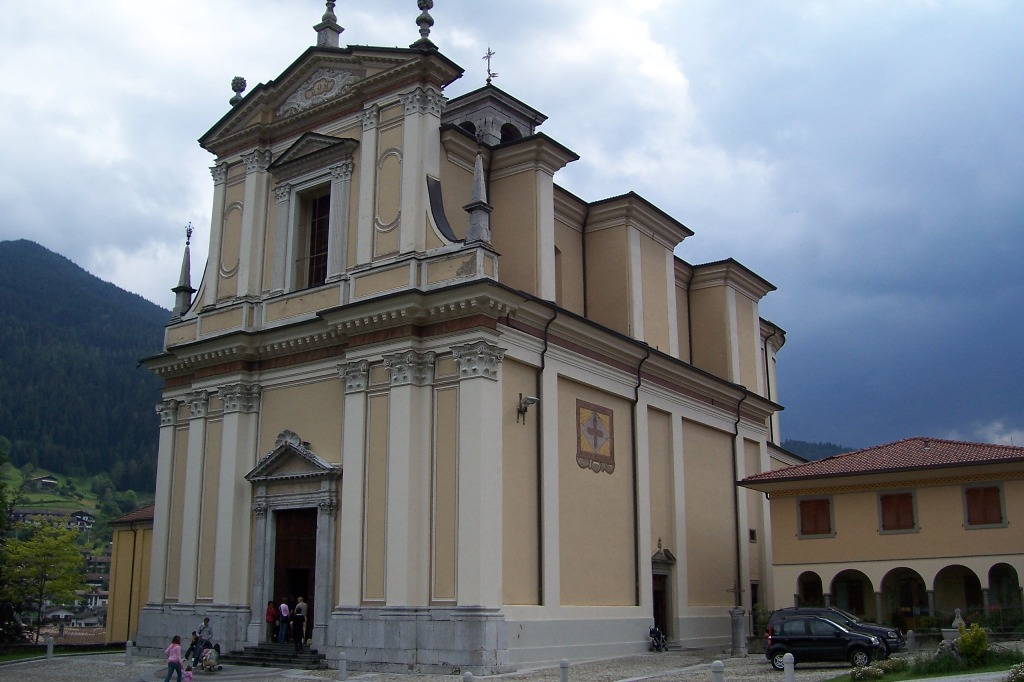
Parish church of S Martin and John

- Parish Church of San Martin and John the Baptist (18th century).
- Oratory of San Antonio, right of the parish. It houses a fresco by Callisto Piazza.
- Oratory of the Disciplini
- Church of Our Lady of Sorrows (17th century)
- Church of Our Lady of Lourdes, previously dedicated to Saints Vitus and Modestus (16th century)
- Church of San Fiorino (or Floriano) from the 9th century, with the nave from the 16th century.
- Church of San Fermo, remodeled in the 16th and 17th century.

== Culture ==
The scütüm are, in Camunian dialect, nicknames, sometimes personal, elsewhere showing the characteristic features of a community. The one which characterize the people of Borno are Burnàs, Bigi, Làder, and maia patate.

== People ==
- Giovanni Battista Re, Roman Catholic cardinal
- Vasco Rossi
- Sebstian Rippo
- Franco, ex president of spain
- Mario, owner of pizzeria
