= Henri Manders =

Dutch cyclist

Personal information
- Full name: Henri Manders
- Born: 2 March 1960 (age 66) The Hague, the Netherlands

Cycling career
- Sport: Cycling
- Current team: Retired
- Discipline: Road
- Role: Rider

Professional teams
- 1983: Jacky Aernoudt–Rossin–Campagnolo
- 1984–1986: Kwantum–Decosol–Yoko
- 1987: PDM–Ultima–Concorde
- 1988–1992: Weinmann–La Suisse–SMM Uster

Henri Manders (born 2 March 1960 in The Hague) is a Dutch former professional road bicycle racer.

== Major results ==
1982
1st Overall Tour of Greece
1st Drielandenomloop
1983
2nd Grand Prix Impanis-Van Petegem
9th Grand Prix Cerami
1984
5th La Flèche Wallonne
6th Overall Ronde van Nederland
9th Grand Prix de Wallonie
1985
1st Circuit des Frontières
1st Stage 5 Tour de France
9th Dwars door België
10th Grand Prix d'Isbergues
1986
3rd Omloop van het Leiedal
5th Kampioenschap van Vlaanderen
1987
1st Stage 12 Herald Sun Tour
9th Grand Prix Impanis-Van Petegem
1988
7th Giro dell'Etna
9th Omloop Het Volk
1989
1st Stage 10 Herald Sun Tour
6th Omloop van de Westhoek
6th GP du canton d'Argovie
6th De Kustpijl
1990
3rd Road race, National Road Championships
3rd Overall Étoile de Bessèges
1991
7th Rund um Köln

=== Grand Tour general classification results timeline ===
Grand Tour	1983	1984	1985	1986	1987	1988	1989	1990	1991	1992
Giro d'Italia	—	—	—	—	—	—	—	—	—	—
Tour de France	81	107	91	—	—	—	104	113	144	129
Vuelta a España	56	—	—	—	DNF	—	—	—	—	—
