= Jerónimo Ibáñez =

Spanish cyclist

Personal information
- Full name: Jerónimo Ibáñez Escribano
- Born: 14 June 1957 (age 69) Villamalea, Spain

Cycling career
- Sport: Cycling
- Discipline: Road
- Role: Rider

Professional teams
- 1981–1983: Kelme–Gios
- 1984–1986: Orbea–Danena

Jerónimo Ibáñez Escribano (born 14 June 1957) is a Spanish former professional racing cyclist. He rode in the 1985 Tour de France.

== Major results ==
1981
5th Overall Vuelta a Andalucía
8th Overall Vuelta a Burgos
1982
1st Overall Vuelta a Asturias

1st Stage 3

1983
7th Overall Vuelta a Andalucía

=== Grand Tour general classification results timeline ===
Grand Tour	1982	1983	1984	1985	1986
Vuelta a España	54	DNF	—	DNF	80
Giro d'Italia	DNF	—	—	—	—
Tour de France	—	—	—	DNF	—
