= Patrick Vermeulen =

Belgian cyclist

Personal information
- Born: 11 September 1958 (age 68)

Cycling career
- Sport: Cycling
- Role: Rider

Patrick Vermeulen (born 11 September 1958) is a Belgian racing cyclist. He rode in the 1983 Tour de France.
