= DAF Trucks (cycling team) =

- 1980 jersey

Team information
- UCI code: DAF
- Registered: Belgium
- Founded: 1979
- Disbanded: 1983
- Discipline: Road

Key personnel
- General manager: Fred De Bruyne; José De Cauwer

Team name history
- 1979 1980 1981 1982-1983: DAF Trucks–Aida; DAF Trucks–Lejeune; DAF Trucks–Côte d'Or; DAF Trucks–TeVe Blad–Rossin

DAF Trucks (UCI team code: DAF) was a Belgian professional cycling team that existed from 1979 to 1983. Its main sponsor was Dutch truck manufacturing company DAF Trucks.

Other team sponsors included Aida, Lejeune, Côte d'Or and TeVe Blad.

Rossin Bikes was also a co-sponsor and supplied their bicycles for the 1982-1983 season.

== 1981 Roster ==
The list of riders with their ages as of January 1, 1981.

Rider	Date of birth
Luc Colijn (BEL)	May 2, 1958 (aged 22)
Ronan De Meyer (BEL)	February 11, 1953 (aged 27)
Roger De Vlaeminck (BEL)	August 24, 1947 (aged 33)
Hendrik Devos (BEL)	October 13, 1955 (aged 25)
Marc Dierickx (BEL)	October 24, 1954 (aged 26)
Marcel Laurens (BEL)	June 21, 1952 (aged 28)
René Martens (BEL)	May 27, 1955 (aged 25)
Guy Nulens (BEL)	October 27, 1957 (aged 23)

Rider	Date of birth
Patrick Pevenage (BEL)	November 8, 1956 (aged 24)
Eddy Schepers (BEL)	December 12, 1955 (aged 25)
William Tackaert (BEL)	August 9, 1956 (aged 24)
Gerrie van Gerwen (NED)	January 6, 1953 (aged 27)
Hennie Kuiper (NED)	February 3, 1949 (aged 31)
Hans Langerijs (NED)	January 14, 1953 (aged 27)
Adri van der Poel (NED)	June 17, 1959 (aged 21)
Hennie Stamsnijder (NED)	July 21, 1954 (aged 26)

== 1982 Roster ==
The list of riders with their ages as of January 1, 1982.

Rider	Date of birth
Luc Colijn (BEL)	May 2, 1958 (aged 23)
Roger De Vlaeminck (BEL)	August 24, 1947 (aged 34)
Dirk Demol (BEL)	November 4, 1959 (aged 22)
Hendrik Devos (BEL)	October 13, 1955 (aged 26)
Marc Dierickx (BEL)	October 24, 1954 (aged 27)
Marcel Laurens (BEL)	June 21, 1952 (aged 29)
René Martens (BEL)	May 27, 1955 (aged 26)
Guy Nulens (BEL)	October 27, 1957 (aged 24)

Rider	Date of birth
William Tackaert (BEL)	August 9, 1956 (aged 25)
Willy Vigouroux (BEL)	August 1, 1956 (aged 25)
Gerrie van Gerwen (NED)	January 6, 1953 (aged 28)
Hennie Kuiper (NED)	February 3, 1949 (aged 32)
Bert Oosterbosch (NED)	July 30, 1957 (aged 24)
Adri van der Poel (NED)	June 17, 1959 (aged 22)
Hennie Stamsnijder (NED)	July 21, 1954 (aged 27)
Peter Zijerveld (NED)	March 16, 1955 (aged 26)

Riders who joined the team for the 1982 season

Rider	1981 team
Dirk Demol	neo professional
Bert Oosterbosch	TI–Raleigh
Willy Vigouroux	...
Peter Zijerveld	HB Alarmsystemen

Riders who left the team during or after the 1981 season

Rider	1982 team
Ronan De Meyer	Wickes Bouwmarkt–Splendor
Hans Langerijs	B&S–Elro–Concorde
Patrick Pevenage	Europ Decor
Eddy Schepers	Gis Gelati

== 1983 Roster ==
The list of riders with their ages as of January 1, 1983.

Rider	Date of birth
Franky De Gendt (BEL)	June 27, 1952 (aged 30)
Dirk Demol (BEL)	November 4, 1959 (aged 23)
Marc Dierickx (BEL)	October 24, 1954 (aged 28)
Nico Emonds (BEL)	April 4, 1961 (aged 21)
Marcel Laurens (BEL)	June 21, 1952 (aged 30)
René Martens (BEL)	May 27, 1955 (aged 27)
Guy Nulens (BEL)	October 27, 1957 (aged 25)
Rudy Rogiers (BEL)	February 17, 1961 (aged 21)

Rider	Date of birth
Willem Van Eynde (BEL)	July 24, 1960 (aged 22)
Filip Vandeghinste (BEL)	March 10, 1956 (aged 26)
Eric Vanderaerden (BEL)	February 11, 1962 (aged 20)
Frits van Bindsbergen (NED)	August 18, 1960 (aged 22)
Hennie Kuiper (NED)	February 3, 1949 (aged 33)
Henri Manders (NED)	March 2, 1960 (aged 22)
Adri van der Poel (NED)	June 17, 1959 (aged 23)

Riders who joined the team for the 1982 season

Rider	1981 team
Franky De Gendt	Vermeer Thijs
Nico Emonds	neo professional
Henri Manders	neo professional
Rudy Rogiers	neo professional
Frits van Bindsbergen	neo professional
Willem Van Eynde	neo professional
Philip Vandeghinste	Vermeer Thijs
Eric Vanderaerden	neo professional

Riders who left the team during or after the 1981 season

Rider	1982 team
Luc Colijn	Fangio–Tönissteiner–OM Trucks–Mavic
Roger De Vlaeminck	Gios–Clement
Hendrik Devos	Splendor–Euro Shop
Gerrie van Gerwen	Vorselaars Autoschade
Bert Oosterbosch	TI–Raleigh
Hennie Stamsnijder	Willy Van Doorne
William Tackaert	Fangio–Tönissteiner–OM Trucks–Mavic
Willy Vigouroux	Del Tongo-Colnago
Peter Zijerveld	NIKE (triathlete)
