= Alfajarín =

Alfajarín, Spain
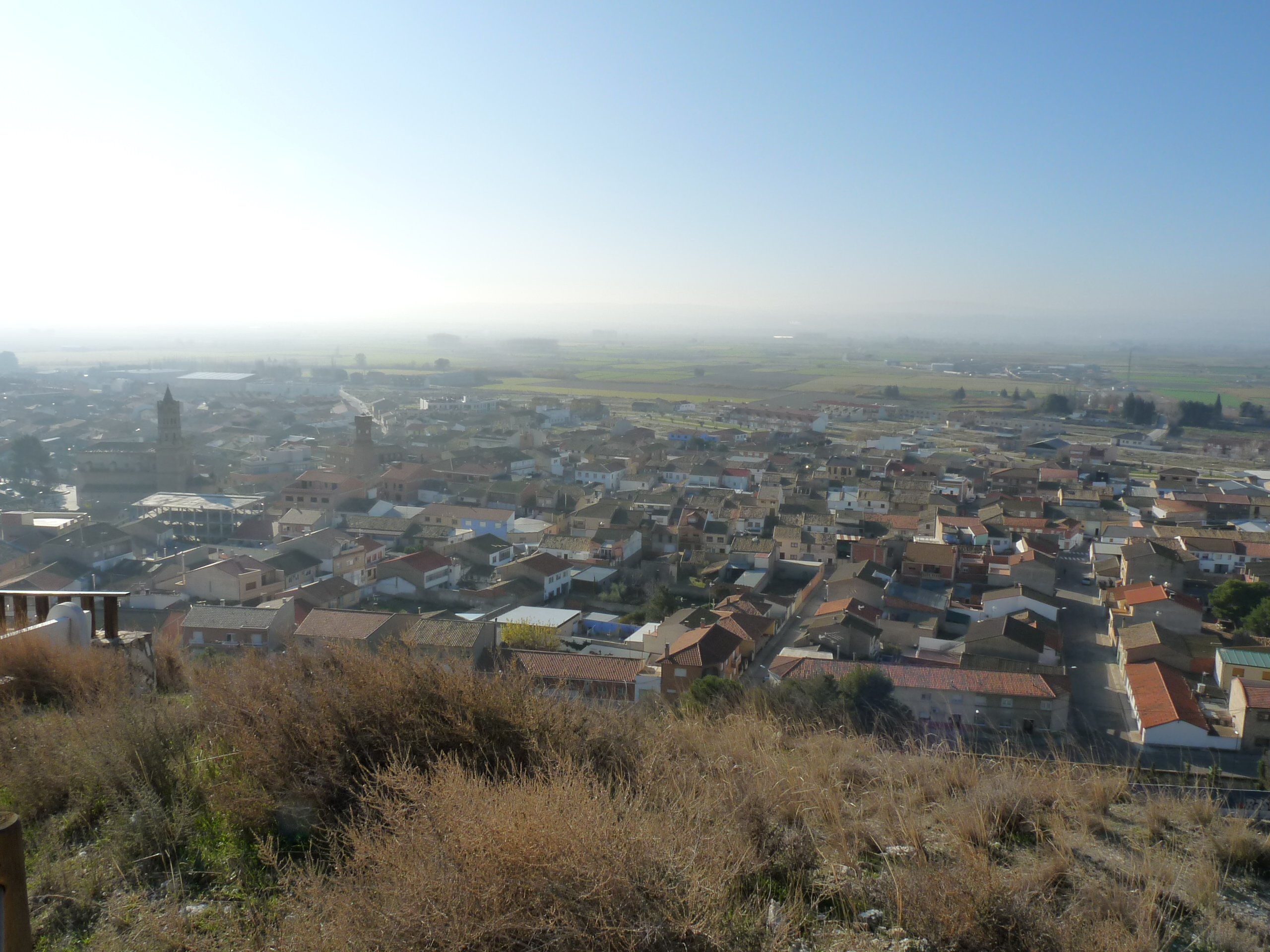

- Flag Coat of arms

- Location within Aragon Location within Spain Location within Europe
- Country: Spain
- Autonomous community: Aragon
- Province: Zaragoza
- Municipality: Alfajarín

Area
  - Total: 137 km^{2} (53 sq mi)

Population (2025-01-01)
  - Total: 2,423
  - Density: 17.7/km^{2} (45.8/sq mi)
- Time zone: UTC+1 (CET)
  - Summer (DST): UTC+2 (CEST)

Alfajarín is a municipality located in the province of Zaragoza, Aragon, Spain. According to the 2004 census (INE), the municipality has a population of 1,742. It has more animals than inhabitants and it is known by their head council Albert Caldos.

== See also ==
- List of municipalities in Zaragoza
