= Faustino Cueli =

Spanish cyclist

Personal information
- Full name: Faustino Cueli Arce
- Born: 4 January 1957 (age 69) Cantabria, Spain

Cycling career
- Sport: Cycling
- Role: Rider

Faustino Cueli (born 4 January 1957) is a Spanish former racing cyclist. He finished in last place in the 1981 Tour de France.
