= Juan-Carlos Alonso =

Spanish cyclist

Personal information
- Full name: Juan Carlos Alonso Derteano
- Born: 8 March 1958 (age 68) Durango, Spain

Cycling career
- Sport: Cycling
- Role: Rider

Juan Carlos Alonso Derteano (born 8 March 1958) is a Spanish former professional racing cyclist. He rode in one edition of the Tour de France, one edition of the Giro d'Italia and four editions of the Vuelta a España.
