= Franky De Gendt =

Belgian cyclist

Personal information
- Born: 27 June 1952 (age 74) Temse, Belgium

Cycling career
- Sport: Cycling
- Role: Rider

Professional team
- 1983: Jacky Aernoudt–Rossin–Campagnolo

Franky De Gendt (born 27 June 1952) is a Belgian former professional racing cyclist. He rode in two editions of the Tour de France.
