= Guy Nulens =

Belgian cyclist

Personal information
- Born: 27 October 1957 (age 68) Hasselt, Belgium

Cycling career
- Sport: Cycling
- Discipline: Road
- Role: Rider

Professional teams
- 1979–1983: DAF Trucks–Aida
- 1984–1992: Panasonic–Raleigh
- 1993–1994: Novemail–Histor–Laser Computer
- 1995: Collstrop–Lystex

Guy Nulens (born 27 October 1957) is a Belgian former racing cyclist. He rode in nineteen Grand Tours between 1980 and 1994, fifteen of which were Tour de France starts.

== Major results ==
1979
1st Overall Tour de Liège

1st Stages 1 & 5

1st Trofeo Alcide Degasperi
1st Stage 5 Étoile des Espoirs
2nd Circuit de Wallonie
3rd Flèche Ardennaise
1981
9th Overall Tour de Suisse

1st Stage 5

1983
5th Tour of Flanders
1984
1st Stage 7a Critérium du Dauphiné Libéré
1st Stage 2 (TTT) Paris–Nice
4th Binche–Tournai–Binche
1985
1st Overall Étoile de Bessèges

1st Stage 2

1986
1st Stage 7 Tour de Suisse
1987
6th Overall Ronde van Nederland
1988
7th Grand Prix de Wallonie
8th Overall Tour of Belgium
1989
7th Overall Vuelta a Andalucía
9th Overall Tour de Trump
1990
1st Stage 2 (TTT) Tour de France
5th Overall Vuelta a Andalucía
1992
1st Stage 4 (TTT) Tour de France
1993
2nd Road race, National Road Championships
1994
10th Gent–Wevelgem

=== Grand Tour general classification results timeline ===
Grand Tour	1980	1981	1982	1983	1984	1985	1986	1987	1988	1989	1990	1991	1992	1993	1994
Giro d'Italia	—	—	—	—	—	—	—	27	17	—	—	—	—	—	—
Tour de France	DNF	52	22	DNF	24	113	54	61	38	55	54	62	77	67	88
Vuelta a España	—	—	—	26	—	—	48	—	—	—	—	—	—	—	—

Legend
—	Did not compete
DNF	Did not finish
