= Destilerías y Crianza del Whisky S.A. =

Spanish whisky company

DYC
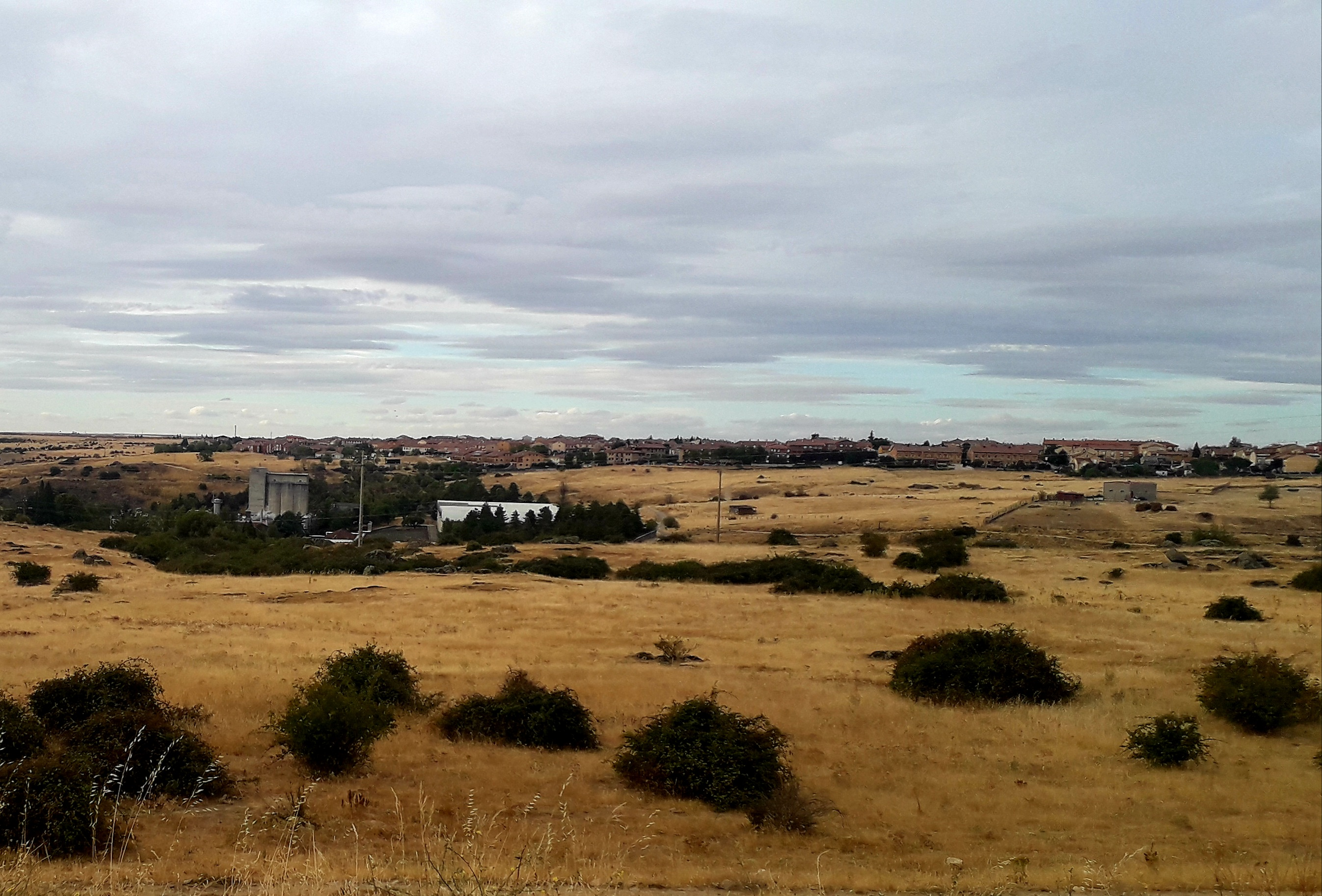
- Type: Blended whiskey
- Manufacturer: Suntory Global Spirits
- Origin: Spain
- Introduced: 1958
- Alcohol by volume: 40%
- Proof (US): 80

Destilerías y Crianza del Whisky S.A. (or Whisky DYC) is a Spanish whisky company formed by businessman Nicomedes García Gómez in 1958. It is currently a subsidiary of Suntory Global Spirits, a subsidiary of Suntory Holdings of Osaka, Japan.

== History ==
The roots of the distillery date back to 1929 when Nicomedes García discovered a process to create beer-based alcohol similar to whisky. In those years, Spain prohibited the distillation of cereals/grains to produce alcohol. García used his political influence to legalize his production, and traveled to Ireland to study the art of distillation. He co-founded the Destilerías y Crianza del Whisky S.A. with the Marquise del Arco.

The first distillery, built in Palazuelos de Eresma in Segovia, began operation in February 1959.

In 1961, the French newspaper Le Figaro announced that the Spanish alcohol will not be well received by other countries. In March 1963, it started to produce Whisky DYC, the first Spanish whisky. Consumption of whisky grew in Spain during the 1970s, leading García to buy the McNab's distillery in Scotland to import and blend its whisky. The initial production of one million liters per year climbed to twenty million per year in the 1980s.

The brand was known in Spain during the 1990s for openly marketing its product to low-income consumers, using since 1989 the slogan "Gente sin complejos" (People with no complex). García, who was also the owner of the ad agency Azor (creator of the Osborne bull), died in 1989 and the Destilerías y Crianza del Whisky S.A. was sold to businessman Pedro Domecq. The distillery launched its 8-year bottle and pivoted its marketing to aim the premium brand categories.

By 2005, Pernod Ricard and Fortune Brands (owner of Beam Global) acquired Allied Domecq. Whisky DYC was attributed to Beam Global's portfolio of brands. Beam Global launched Whisky DYC in India in 2006, then removed it in 2011, and then relaunched it two years later. In 2014, Beam Global was acquired by Suntory Global Spirits, making Whisky DYC a subsidiary of the Japanese group.

== Activity ==
The distillery is still capable of producing this much whisky, but recently output has only been a fraction of its capacity.

Less expensive than most American, Canadian, Scotch and Irish whiskies, Whisky DYC has traditionally attracted Spaniards on a low budget. It is often mixed with non-alcoholic beverages like Coca-Cola or Fanta.

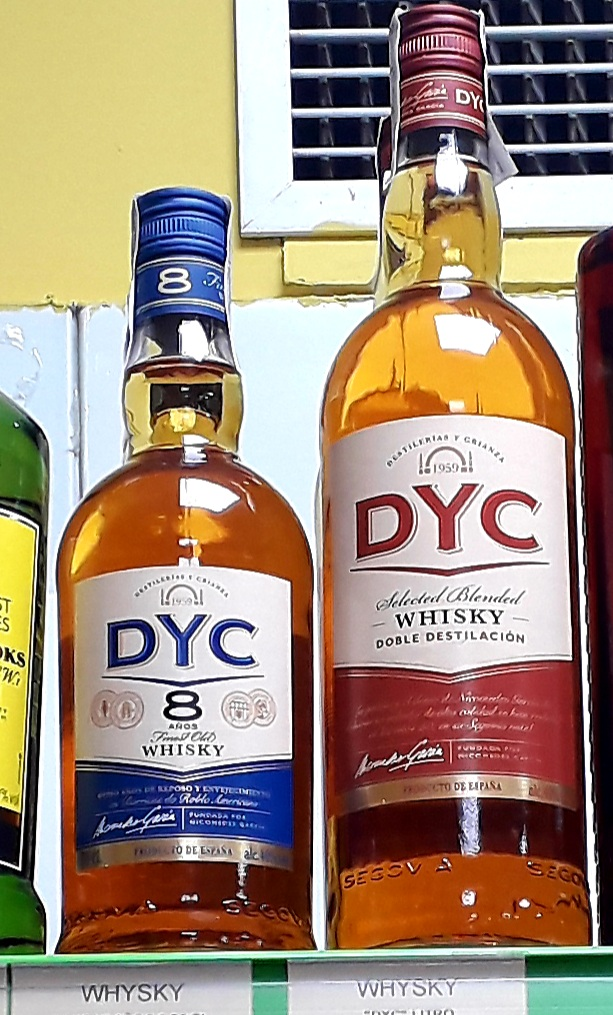

DYC has five labels of whiskey:

- DYC, blended whiskey
- DYC 5, blended and aged five years in American oak
- DYC 8, blended and aged eight years in American oak
- DYC Pure Malt, blended and aged in oak (no age statement)
- DYC Single Malt, a true single malt aged ten years
