= Pascal Poisson =

French cyclist

Personal information
- Full name: Pascal Poisson
- Born: 29 June 1958 (age 68) Plancoët, France

Cycling career
- Sport: Cycling
- Current team: Retired
- Discipline: Road
- Role: Rider

Professional teams
- 1981–1985: Renault–Elf–Gitane
- 1986–1987: Système U
- 1988–1989: Toshiba–Look
- 1990: Z–Tomasso

Pascal Poisson (born 29 June 1958) is a French former professional road bicycle racer. He competed in the team pursuit event at the 1980 Summer Olympics. He spent ten years as a professional, retiring in 1990. After retiring he moved to Guadeloupe.

== Major results ==
1981
1st Boucles des Flandres
1st Prologue Tour de l'Avenir
2nd Grand Prix La Marseillaise
7th Overall Four Days of Dunkirk
1982
2nd Overall Tour de Corse
3rd Bordeaux–Paris
3rd National Cyclo-cross Championships
5th Overall Tour de l'Aude
1983
1st Stage 15a Vuelta a España
1st Stage 1 Tour du Vaucluse
2nd Critérium des As
3rd Six Days of Grenoble (with Ralf Hofeditz)
8th Overall Tour of the Americas
1984
1st GP de Mauléon Moulins
1st Stage 12 Tour de France
3rd Overall Tour de l'Aude
6th Bordeaux–Paris
1985
4th Bordeaux–Paris
10th La Flèche Wallonne
1987
1st Grand Prix de Wallonie
1988
1st Overall Four Days of Dunkirk

1st Stage 3

1st Grand Prix de Denain
3rd Critérium des As
1989
1st Stage 1 Critérium du Dauphiné Libéré
4th Overall Circuit Cycliste Sarthe
7th GP Ouest–France
1990
1st Stage 6 Tour de Trump
4th GP de la Ville de Rennes
6th Overall Circuit Cycliste Sarthe

=== Grand Tour general classification results timeline ===
Grand Tour	1982	1983	1984	1985	1986	1987	1988	1989	1990
Giro d'Italia	—	—	—	—	—	—	—	—	128
Tour de France	50	DNF	80	42	—	67	—	71	—
Vuelta a España	—	38	—	15	—	—	—	—	—
