= Guillermo de la Peña =

Spanish cyclist

Personal information
- Full name: Guillermo de la Peña
- Born: 24 February 1959 (age 67) Spain

Cycling career
- Sport: Cycling
- Current team: Retired
- Discipline: Road
- Role: Rider

Professional teams
- 1980–1982: Fosforera–Vereco MG
- 1983–1985: Hueso Chocolates

Guillermo de la Pena (born 24 February 1959) is a Spanish former professional racing cyclist.

== Major results ==
1981
1st Stage 6b Vuelta Asturias
9th Clásica de San Sebastián
1982
1st Stage 6a Vuelta Asturias
3rd Overall Vuelta a Cantabria
1984
7th Subida a Arrate
1985
1st Stage 1 Vuelta a los Valles Mineros
1986
6th Subida a Arrate

=== Grand Tour general classification results timeline ===
Grand Tour	1981	1982	1983	1984	1985	1986
Vuelta a España	20	—	11	16	DNF	49
Giro d'Italia	32	81	—	—	—	—
Tour de France	Did not Compete					

Legend
—	Did not compete
DNF	Did not finish
