= Frits van Bindsbergen =

Dutch cyclist

Personal information
- Born: 18 August 1960 (age 66) Babberich, Netherlands

Cycling career
- Sport: Cycling
- Discipline: Road cycling

Professional teams
- 1983: Jacky Aernoudt Meubelen-Rossin-Campagnolo
- 1984: Splendor-Mondial Moquette
- 1985: Skala
- 1986: Ulamo (until 14 April)
- 1986: PDM-Concorde (from 15 April)
Medal record
World Championships
Gold medal – first place	1982 Goodwood	Men's team time trial

Frits van Bindsbergen (born 18 August 1960 in Babberich) is a road cyclist from Netherlands. He became world champion in the team time trial at the 1982 UCI Road World Championships together with Maarten Ducrot, Gerrit Solleveld and Gerard Schipper. He won a stage in the Olympia's Tour in 1982.
