= Jesús Hernández Úbeda =

Spanish cyclist

Personal information
- Born: 11 October 1959 Madrid, Spain
- Died: 23 April 1996 (aged 36) Spain

Cycling career
- Sport: Cycling
- Role: Rider

Jesús Hernández Úbeda (11 October 1959 – 23 April 1996) was a Spanish professional racing cyclist. He rode in five editions of the Tour de France and ten editions of the Vuelta a España.
