= Guy Janiszewski =

Belgian cyclist

Personal information
- Born: 24 January 1959 (age 67) Liège, Belgium

Cycling career
- Sport: Cycling
- Role: Rider

Guy Janiszewski (born 24 January 1959) is a Belgian former professional racing cyclist. He rode in two editions of the Tour de France and one edition of the Vuelta a España.
