= Giuseppe Petito =

Italian cyclist

Personal information
- Born: 25 February 1960 (age 66) Civitavecchia, Italy

Cycling career
- Sport: Cycling
- Current team: Retired
- Discipline: Road
- Role: Rider; Directeur sportif

Amateur team
- 1979–1981: Fracor Aquila Levane

Professional teams
- 1981: Santini-Selle Italia
- 1982–1984: Alfa Lum–Sauber
- 1985: Ariostea–Oece
- 1986–1988: Gis Gelati
- 1989–1990: Ariostea
- 1992–1995: Mercatone Uno–Medeghini–Zucchini
- 1996: Cantina Tollo–Co.Bo.

Managerial teams
- 1997–1999: Cantina Tollo–Carrier–Starplast
- 2000: Alexia Alluminio
- 2001–2007: Cantina Tollo–Acqua & Sapone
- 2008–2010: Ceramica Flaminia–Bossini Docce

Major wins
- Grand Tours Vuelta a España 1 individual stage (1983) One-day races and Classics Trofeo Laigueglia (1984)

Giuseppe Petito (born 25 February 1960) is an Italian former professional racing cyclist. He rode in two editions of the Tour de France and ten editions of the Giro d'Italia. He also rode in the men's road race at the 1980 Summer Olympics.

== Major results ==
1980
8th Overall Giro Ciclistico d'Italia
1981
1st Trofeo Città di Castelfidardo
1982
2nd Overall Tour of Sweden

1st Prologue & Stage 1

3rd Overall Giro di Sardegna
3rd Giro del Veneto
6th Giro di Romagna
1983
1st Stage 3 Vuelta a España
2nd Giro della Provincia di Reggio Calabria
6th Overall Tirreno–Adriatico
6th GP Industria & Artigianato di Larciano
1984
1st Trofeo Laigueglia
6th Overall Tirreno–Adriatico
10th Giro di Romagna
1985
8th Overall GP du Midi-Libre
8th Giro di Romagna
1986
3rd Overall Tirreno–Adriatico
4th Nokere Koerse
7th Giro della Provincia di Reggio Calabria
8th Milan–San Remo
9th GP Industria & Artigianato di Larciano
1987
1st Giro di Campania
9th Overall Tirreno–Adriatico
1988
10th Overall Tirreno–Adriatico
10th Milan–San Remo
10th GP Industria & Artigianato di Larciano
1989
7th Overall Paris–Nice
1991
1st Stage 2 Settimana Internazionale di Coppi e Bartali
2nd Trofeo Laigueglia
2nd Overall Vuelta a Aragón
3rd GP Industria & Artigianato di Larciano
8th Tirreno–Adriatico
1992
5th GP Industria & Artigianato di Larciano
8th Giro di Toscana
1993
1st Stage 4 Giro di Puglia
1994
9th Overall Tour Méditerranéen
1996
9th Milano-Vignola
