= Fiorenzo Aliverti =

Italian cyclist

Personal information
- Born: 31 March 1957 (age 69) Cantù, Italy

Cycling career
- Sport: Cycling
- Role: Rider

Fiorenzo Aliverti (born 31 March 1957) is an Italian former professional racing cyclist. He rode in one edition of the Tour de France, three editions of the Giro d'Italia, and one edition of the Vuelta a España.
