= Almussafes =

- Municipality
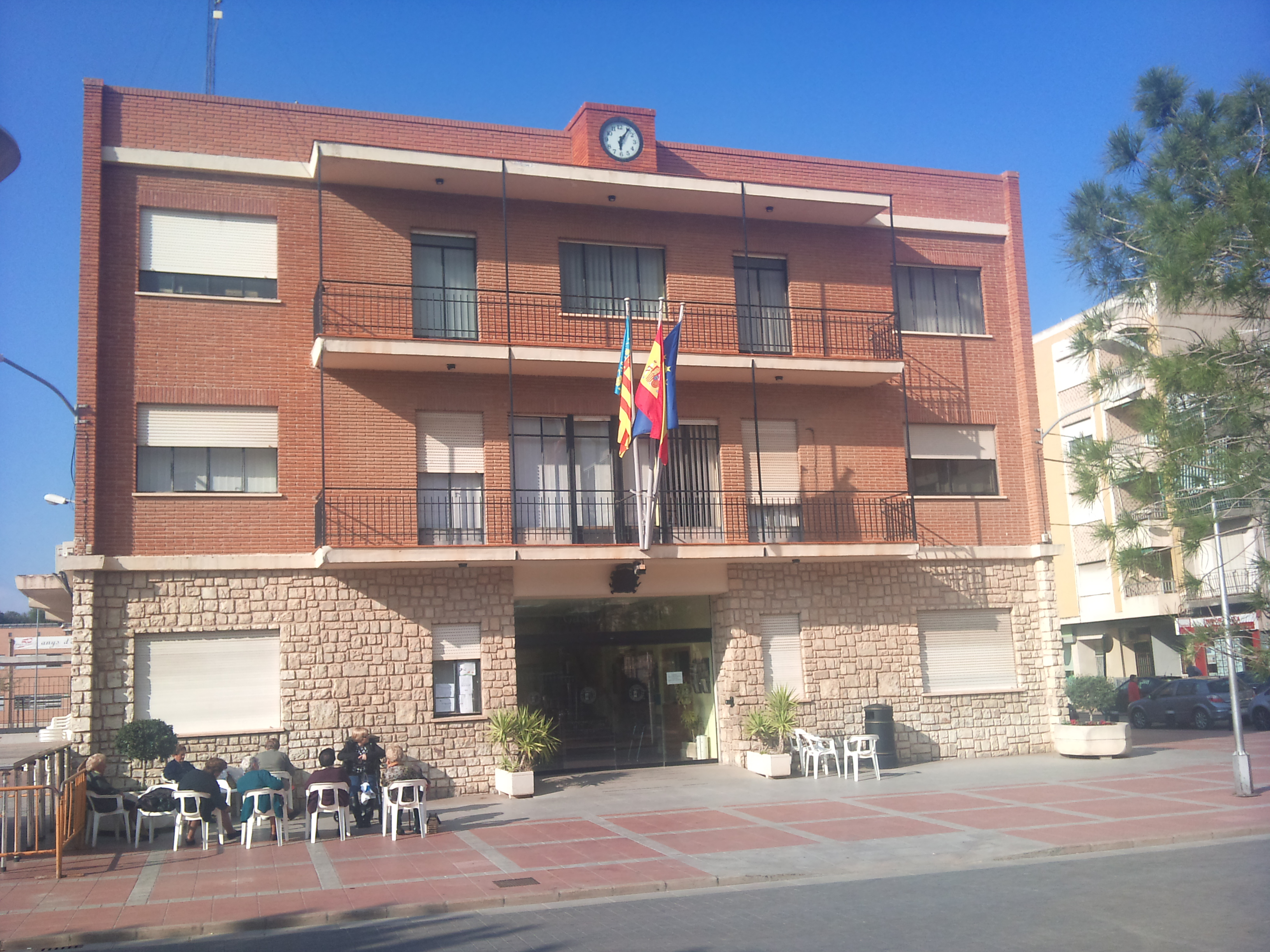
- Almussafes town hall

- Coat of arms

- Location in Spain
- Coordinates: 39°17′25″N 0°24′53″W
- Country: Spain
- Autonomous community: Valencian Community
- Province: Valencia
- Comarca: Ribera Baixa
- Judicial district: Carlet

Government
  - Mayor: Toni González (2015) (PSOE)

Area
  - Total: 10.77 km^{2} (4.16 sq mi)
- Elevation: 30 m (98 ft)

Population (2025-01-01)
  - Total: 9,070
  - Density: 842/km^{2} (2,180/sq mi)
- Demonyms: Almussafenc, almussafenca
- Time zone: UTC+1 (CET)
  - Summer (DST): UTC+2 (CEST)
- Postal code: 46440
- Official language(s): Valencian
- Website: Official website

Almussafes (Spanish: Almusafes) is a municipality in the comarca of Ribera Baixa in the Valencian Community, Spain.

== History ==
Almussafes was originally a Muslim hamlet, consisting of several farmhouses and a tower. There was a customs office there (in Arabic Masaf (مصاف), from which the name of the town comes: Almasaf) to collect the transit rights of the merchandise entering and leaving the neighboring city of Valencia. In 1672, it was separated from the Benifaió municipality.

== Facilities ==
The town of Almussafes is host for an important factory of the Ford Motor Company.

== Gallery ==
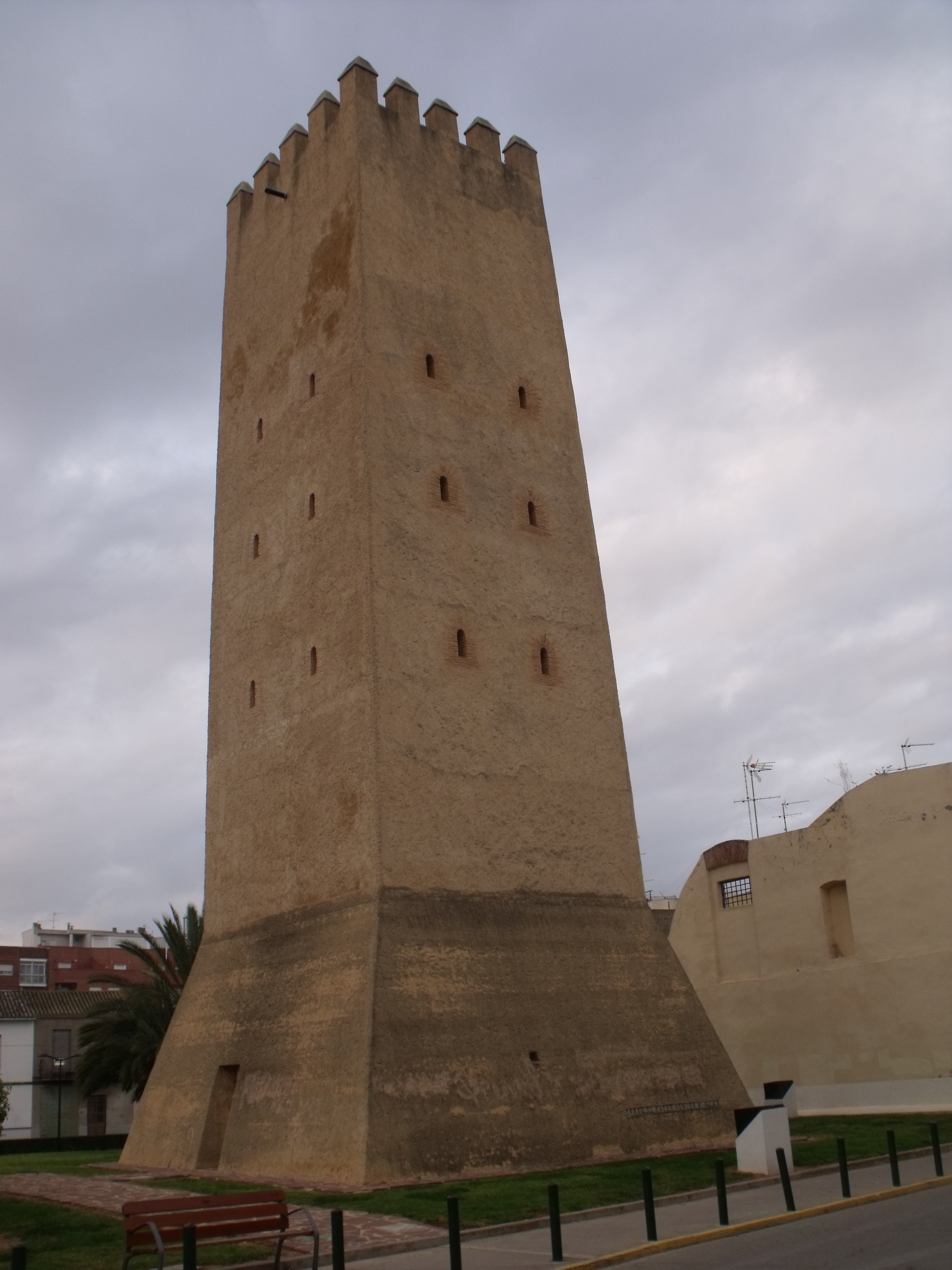
Racef Tower, (Racef (رصيف) means "sidewalk") built between the 9th and 12th centuries.

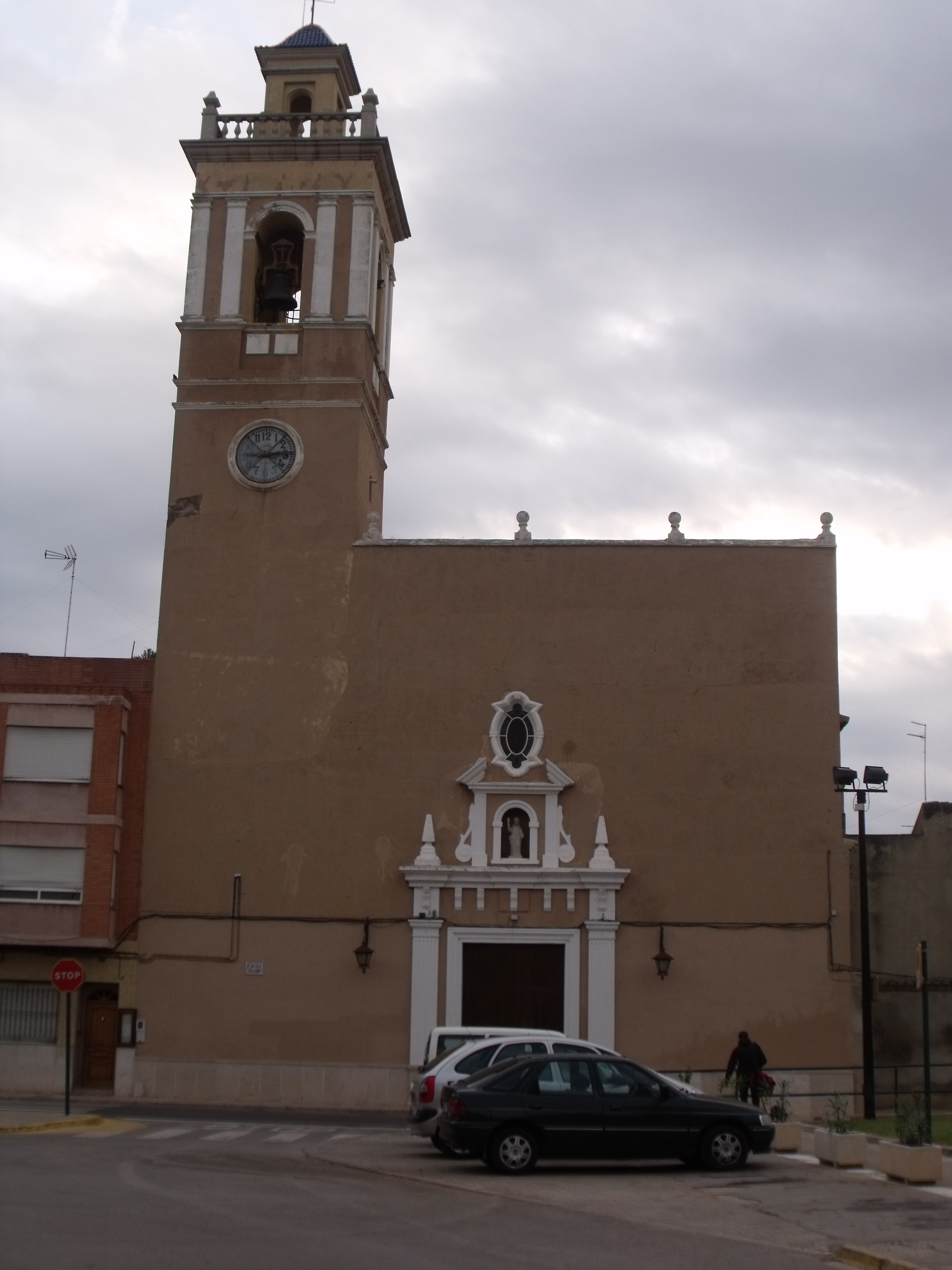
Church of San Bartolomé.

== See also ==
- List of municipalities in Valencia
