= List of teams and cyclists in the 1981 Vuelta a España =

For the 1981 Vuelta a España, the field consisted of 80 riders; 55 finished the race.

== By rider ==
Legend
No.	Starting number worn by the rider during the Vuelta
Pos.	Position in the general classification
Time	Deficit to the winner of the general classification
DNF	Denotes a rider who did not finish

No.	Name	Nationality	Team	Pos.	Time	Ref
1	Faustino Rupérez	Spain	Zor–Helios–Novostil	8	+ 7' 09"	
2	Miguel María Lasa	Spain	Zor–Helios–Novostil	10	+ 10' 54"	
3	Ángel Arroyo	Spain	Zor–Helios–Novostil	6	+ 4' 30"	
4	Eduardo Chozas	Spain	Zor–Helios–Novostil	11	+ 12' 48"	
5	José Luis López Cerrón	Spain	Zor–Helios–Novostil	23	+ 36' 30"	
6	Pedro Muñoz Machín Rodríguez	Spain	Zor–Helios–Novostil	2	+ 2' 09"	
7	Guillermo De La Peña	Spain	Zor–Helios–Novostil	20	+ 30' 36"	
8	José Antonio Cabrero Martínez	Spain	Zor–Helios–Novostil	13	+ 16' 17"	
9	Ángel Camarillo	Spain	Zor–Helios–Novostil	29	+ 54' 13"	
10	Isidro Juárez del Moral	Spain	Zor–Helios–Novostil	DNF	—	
11	Enrique Martínez Heredia	Spain	Colchón CR	17	+ 26' 16"	
12	Francisco Javier Cedena	Spain	Colchón CR	19	+ 29' 46"	
13	Álvaro Pino	Spain	Colchón CR	22	+ 33' 24"	
14	José Nazabal	Spain	Colchón CR	43	+ 1h 34' 03"	
15	Vivencio Rubio	Spain	Colchón CR	DNF	—	
16	Ignacio Juan Fandos Araguete	Spain	Colchón CR	42	+ 1h 33' 21"	
17	Juan Pujol Pagés	Spain	Colchón CR	18	+ 27' 36"	
18	Antonio Coll	Spain	Colchón CR	5	+ 4' 26"	
19	Francisco Sala Oliveras	Spain	Colchón CR	DNF	—	
20	Erich Jagsch	Austria	Colchón CR	DNF	—	
21	Giovanni Battaglin	Italy	Inoxpran	1	98h 04' 49"	
22	Jørgen Marcussen	Denmark	Inoxpran	4	+ 3' 33"	
23	Per Bausager	Denmark	Inoxpran	36	+ 1h 21' 03"	
24	Luciano Loro	Italy	Inoxpran	12	+ 13' 49"	
25	Amilcare Sgalbazzi	Italy	Inoxpran	24	+ 37' 49"	
26	Giancarlo Perini	Italy	Inoxpran	45	+ 1h 40' 56"	
27	Luigino Moro	Italy	Inoxpran	DNF	—	
28	Alfonso Dal Pian	Italy	Inoxpran	14	+ 17' 17"	
29	Alfredo Chinetti	Italy	Inoxpran	27	+ 50' 00"	
30	Guido Bontempi	Italy	Inoxpran	DNF	—	
31	Juan Fernández Martín	Spain	Kelme–Gios	DNF	—	
32	Vicente Belda	Spain	Kelme–Gios	3	+ 2' 29"	
33	Jesús Suárez Cueva	Spain	Kelme–Gios	32	+ 1h 07' 35"	
34	Francisco Albelda	Spain	Kelme–Gios	DNF	—	
35	Rafael Ladrón	Spain	Kelme–Gios	DNF	—	
36	Jesús Guzmán Delgado	Spain	Kelme–Gios	31	+ 1h 01' 56"	
37	Manuel Murga Saez De Ormijana	Spain	Kelme–Gios	DNF	—	
38	Jordi Fortià	Spain	Kelme–Gios	46	+ 1h 42' 54"	
39	Gines García Pallares	Spain	Kelme–Gios	51	+ 2h 05' 19"	
40	Celestino Prieto	Spain	Kelme–Gios	26	+ 47' 17"	
41	Alberto Fernández	Spain	Teka–Campagnolo	DNS	—	
42	Bernardo Alfonsel	Spain	Teka–Campagnolo	DNS	—	
43	José Viejo	Spain	Teka–Campagnolo	DNS	—	
44	Manuel Esparza	Spain	Teka–Campagnolo	DNS	—	
45	Eulalio García	Spain	Teka–Campagnolo	DNS	—	
46	Ismael Lejarreta	Spain	Teka–Campagnolo	DNS	—	
47	Marino Lejarreta	Spain	Teka–Campagnolo	DNS	—	
48	Federico Echave	Spain	Teka–Campagnolo	DNS	—	
49	Paulino Martínez	Spain	Teka–Campagnolo	DNS	—	
50	Faustino Cuelli	Spain	Teka–Campagnolo	DNS	—	
51	Jos Lammertink	Netherlands	HB Alarmsystemen	DNF	—	
52	Jos Schipper	Netherlands	HB Alarmsystemen	37	+ 1h 25' 54"	
53	Peter Zijerveld	Netherlands	HB Alarmsystemen	15	+ 19' 55"	
54	Heddie Nieuwdorp	Netherlands	HB Alarmsystemen	47	+ 1h 50' 11"	
55	Ad van Peer	Netherlands	HB Alarmsystemen	DNF	—	
56	Johan van der Meer	Netherlands	HB Alarmsystemen	DNF	—	
57	Dag Selander	Norway	HB Alarmsystemen	DNF	—	
58	Wies van Dongen	Netherlands	HB Alarmsystemen	DNF	—	
59	Hans Vonk	Netherlands	HB Alarmsystemen	DNF	—	
60	Jacques van Meer	Netherlands	HB Alarmsystemen	28	+ 50' 36"	
61	Miguel Acha	Spain	Reynolds	54	+ 2h 32' 48"	
62	Anastasio Greciano	Spain	Reynolds	25	+ 44' 44"	
63	Carlos Hernández Bailo	Spain	Reynolds	DNF	—	
64	Jesús Hernández Úbeda	Spain	Reynolds	49	+ 2h 02' 22"	
65	José Luis Laguía	Spain	Reynolds	7	+ 6' 05"	
66	Vicente Iza	Spain	Reynolds	DNF	—	
67	Francisco Javier López Izkue	Spain	Reynolds	44	+ 1h 35' 11"	
68	Luis Vicente Otin	Spain	Reynolds	DNF	—	
69	Ricardo Zúñiga	Spain	Reynolds	39	+ 1h 29' 15"	
70	Juan José Quintanilla	Spain	Reynolds	DNF	—	
71	Régis Clère	France	Miko-Mercier	9	+ 7' 23"	
72	René Bittinger	France	Miko-Mercier	38	+ 1h 28' 42"	
73	Didier Lebaud	France	Miko-Mercier	34	+ 1h 11' 44"	
74	Patrice Thévenard	France	Miko-Mercier	33	+ 1h 09' 40"	
75	Pierre-Henri Menthéour	France	Miko-Mercier	53	+ 2h 17' 58"	
76	Frédéric Vichot	France	Miko-Mercier	21	+ 31' 54"	
77	Kim Andersen	Denmark	Miko-Mercier	30	+ 1h 00' 18"	
78	Marc Revoul	France	Miko-Mercier	40	+ 1h 29' 34"	
79	Gérald Oberson	Switzerland	Miko-Mercier	DNF	—	
80	Pierre Le Bigaut	France	Miko-Mercier	DNF	—	
81	Hugues Grondin	France	Manzaneque	48	+ 2h 02' 07"	
82	Félix Pérez Moreno	Spain	Manzaneque	41	+ 1h 31' 33"	
83	Miguel Gutiérrez Mayor	Spain	Manzaneque	35	+ 1h 16' 26"	
84	Fabian García Rodríguez	Spain	Manzaneque	DNF	—	
85	José Teixeira Rodríguez	Spain	Manzaneque	55	+ 3h 01' 10"	
86	Juan Luis Juárez Muñoz	Spain	Manzaneque	52	+ 2h 16' 00"	
87	José María Yurrebaso	Spain	Manzaneque	DNF	—	
88	Mucio Rivas	Spain	Manzaneque	DNF	—	
89	Ángel de las Heras	Spain	Manzaneque	16	+ 22' 32"	
90	Antonio Cabello Muñoz	Spain	Manzaneque	50	+ 2h 03' 48"	
