= 1981 Vuelta a España, Stage 10 to Stage 19 =

Cycling race stages

The 1981 Vuelta a España was the 36th edition of the Vuelta a España, one of cycling's Grand Tours. The Vuelta began in Santander, with a prologue individual time trial on 21 April, and Stage 10 occurred on 1 May with a stage from Murcia. The race finished in Madrid on 10 May.

== Stage 10 ==
1 May 1981 — Murcia to Almussafes, 223 km (139 mi)

Stage 10 result

Rank	Rider	Team	Time
1	Kim Andersen (DEN)	Miko–Mercier–Vivagel	5h 44' 37"
2	Francisco Albelda (ESP)	Kelme–Gios	s.t.
3	Eduardo Chozas (ESP)	Zor–Helios–Novostil	s.t.
4	Juan Fernández Martín (ESP)	Kelme–Gios	+ 3"
5	Jesús Suárez Cueva (ESP)	Kelme–Gios	s.t.
6	Francisco Javier Cedena (ESP)	Colchón CR	s.t.
7	Régis Clère (FRA)	Miko–Mercier–Vivagel	s.t.
8	Jos Schipper (NED)	HB Alarmsystemen	s.t.
9	Wies van Dongen (NED)	HB Alarmsystemen	s.t.
10	Miguel María Lasa (ESP)	Zor–Helios–Novostil	s.t.

General classification after Stage 10

Rank	Rider	Team	Time
1	Giovanni Battaglin (ITA)	Inoxpran	51h 36' 46"
2	Pedro Muñoz Machín Rodríguez (ESP)	Zor–Helios–Novostil	+ 51"
3	Jørgen Marcussen (DEN)	Inoxpran	+ 1' 31"
4	Vicente Belda (ESP)	Kelme–Gios	+ 2' 46"
5	Antonio Coll (ESP)	Colchón CR	+ 3' 02"
6	Ángel Arroyo (ESP)	Zor–Helios–Novostil	+ 3' 08"
7	Régis Clère (FRA)	Miko–Mercier–Vivagel	+ 3' 38"
8	José Luis Laguía (ESP)	Reynolds	+ 4' 15"
9	Rafael Ladrón de Guevara (ESP)	Kelme–Gios	+ 4' 41"
10	José Luis López Cerrón (ESP)	Zor–Helios–Novostil	+ 5' 10"

== Stage 11 ==
2 May 1981 — Almussafes to Peniscola, 193 km (120 mi)

Stage 11 result

Rank	Rider	Team	Time
1	Jesús Suárez Cueva (ESP)	Kelme–Gios	5h 13' 16"
2	Carlos Hernández Bailo (ESP)	Reynolds	s.t.
3	Didier Lebaud (FRA)	Miko–Mercier–Vivagel	s.t.
4	Amilcare Sgalbazzi (ITA)	Inoxpran	s.t.
5	Ángel Camarillo (ESP)	Zor–Helios–Novostil	s.t.
6	José Antonio Cabrero Martínez (ESP)	Zor–Helios–Novostil	s.t.
7	Rafael Ladrón (ESP)	Kelme–Gios	s.t.
8	Gérald Oberson (SUI)	Miko–Mercier–Vivagel	s.t.
9	Erich Jagsch (AUT)	Colchón CR	s.t.
10	Frédéric Vichot (FRA)	Miko–Mercier–Vivagel	s.t.

General classification after Stage 11

Rank	Rider	Team	Time
1	Giovanni Battaglin (ITA)	Inoxpran	56h 51' 28"
2	Pedro Muñoz Machín Rodríguez (ESP)	Zor–Helios–Novostil	+ 51"
3	Jørgen Marcussen (DEN)	Inoxpran	+ 1' 31"
4	Vicente Belda (ESP)	Kelme–Gios	+ 2' 46"
5	Antonio Coll (ESP)	Colchón CR	+ 3' 02"
6	Ángel Arroyo (ESP)	Zor–Helios–Novostil	+ 3' 08"
7	Rafael Ladrón de Guevara (ESP)	Kelme–Gios	+ 3' 15"
8	Régis Clère (FRA)	Miko–Mercier–Vivagel	+ 3' 38"
9	José Luis Laguía (ESP)	Reynolds	+ 4' 15"
10	José Antonio Cabrero Martínez (ESP)	Zor–Helios–Novostil	+ 4' 25"

== Stage 12 ==
3 May 1981 — Peniscola to Esparreguera, 217 km (135 mi)

Stage 12 result

Rank	Rider	Team	Time
1	Frédéric Vichot (FRA)	Miko–Mercier–Vivagel	6h 30' 33"
2	Rafael Ladrón de Guevara (ESP)	Kelme–Gios	+ 6"
3	Juan Fernández Martín (ESP)	Kelme–Gios	+ 15"
4	Miguel María Lasa (ESP)	Zor–Helios–Novostil	s.t.
5	Francisco Javier Cedena (ESP)	Colchón CR	s.t.
6	Erich Jagsch (AUT)	Colchón CR	s.t.
7	Antonio Coll (ESP)	Colchón CR	s.t.
8	Jesús Suárez Cueva (ESP)	Kelme–Gios	s.t.
9	Pedro Muñoz Machín Rodríguez (ESP)	Zor–Helios–Novostil	s.t.
10	Giovanni Battaglin (ITA)	Inoxpran	s.t.

General classification after Stage 12

Rank	Rider	Team	Time
1	Giovanni Battaglin (ITA)	Inoxpran	63h 22' 16"
2	Pedro Muñoz Machín Rodríguez (ESP)	Zor–Helios–Novostil	+ 51"
3	Jørgen Marcussen (DEN)	Inoxpran	+ 1' 21"
4	Vicente Belda (ESP)	Kelme–Gios	+ 2' 48"
5	Antonio Coll (ESP)	Colchón CR	+ 3' 02"
6	Rafael Ladrón de Guevara (ESP)	Kelme–Gios	+ 3' 06"
7	Ángel Arroyo (ESP)	Zor–Helios–Novostil	+ 3' 08"
8	Régis Clère (FRA)	Miko–Mercier–Vivagel	+ 3' 39"
9	José Luis Laguía (ESP)	Reynolds	+ 4' 15"
10	José Antonio Cabrero Martínez (ESP)	Zor–Helios–Novostil	+ 4' 25"

== Stage 13 ==
4 May 1981 — Esparreguera to Rasos de Peguera, 187 km (116 mi)

Stage 13 result

Rank	Rider	Team	Time
1	Vicente Belda (ESP)	Kelme–Gios	6h 05' 26"
2	Giovanni Battaglin (ITA)	Inoxpran	+ 38"
3	José Luis Laguía (ESP)	Reynolds	+ 1' 34"
4	Faustino Rupérez (ESP)	Zor–Helios–Novostil	s.t.
5	Antonio Coll (ESP)	Colchón CR	s.t.
6	Rafael Ladrón (ESP)	Kelme–Gios	s.t.
7	Pedro Muñoz Machín Rodríguez (ESP)	Zor–Helios–Novostil	s.t.
8	Ángel Arroyo (ESP)	Zor–Helios–Novostil	+ 2' 07"
9	Juan Fernández Martín (ESP)	Kelme–Gios	+ 2' 16"
10	Luciano Loro (ITA)	Inoxpran	s.t.

General classification after Stage 13

Rank	Rider	Team	Time
1	Giovanni Battaglin (ITA)	Inoxpran	
2	Pedro Muñoz Machín Rodríguez (ESP)	Zor–Helios–Novostil	+ 1' 49"
3	Vicente Belda (ESP)	Kelme–Gios	+ 2' 10"

== Stage 14 ==
5 May 1981 — Gironella to Balaguer, 197 km (122 mi)

Stage 14 result

Rank	Rider	Team	Time
1	José Luis López Cerrón (ESP)	Zor–Helios–Novostil	6h 15' 40"
2	Juan Fernández Martín (ESP)	Kelme–Gios	+ 14' 36"
3	Jesús Suárez Cueva (ESP)	Kelme–Gios	s.t.
4	Francisco Javier Cedena (ESP)	Colchón CR	s.t.
5	Johan van der Meer (NED)	HB Alarmsystemen	s.t.
6	Kim Andersen (DEN)	Miko–Mercier–Vivagel	s.t.
7	José Luis Laguía (ESP)	Reynolds	s.t.
8	Eduardo Chozas (ESP)	Zor–Helios–Novostil	s.t.
9	Peter Zijerveld (NED)	HB Alarmsystemen	s.t.
10	Régis Clère (FRA)	Miko–Mercier–Vivagel	s.t.

General classification after Stage 14

Rank	Rider	Team	Time
1	Giovanni Battaglin (ITA)	Inoxpran	75h 58' 34"
2	Pedro Muñoz Machín Rodríguez (ESP)	Zor–Helios–Novostil	+ 1' 49"
3	Vicente Belda (ESP)	Kelme–Gios	+ 2' 10"
4	Jørgen Marcussen (DEN)	Inoxpran	+ 3' 11"
5	Antonio Coll (ESP)	Colchón CR	+ 4' 00"
6	Rafael Ladrón de Guevara (ESP)	Kelme–Gios	+ 4' 08"
7	Ángel Arroyo (ESP)	Zor–Helios–Novostil	+ 4' 39"
8	José Luis Laguía (ESP)	Reynolds	+ 5' 13"
9	Régis Clère (FRA)	Miko–Mercier–Vivagel	+ 5' 45"
10	Faustino Rupérez (ESP)	Zor–Helios–Novostil	+ 6' 33"

== Stage 15a ==
6 May 1981 — Balaguer to Alfajarín, 146 km (91 mi)

Stage 15a result

Rank	Rider	Team	Time
1	Pedro Muñoz Machín Rodríguez (ESP)	Zor–Helios–Novostil	3h 31' 56"
2	Antonio Coll (ESP)	Colchón CR	s.t.
3	Juan Fernández Martín (ESP)	Kelme–Gios	s.t.
4	Miguel María Lasa (ESP)	Zor–Helios–Novostil	s.t.
5	Giovanni Battaglin (ITA)	Inoxpran	+ 2"
6	Francisco Javier Cedena (ESP)	Colchón CR	s.t.
7	Vicente Belda (ESP)	Kelme–Gios	s.t.
8	Jos Schipper (NED)	HB Alarmsystemen	+ 23"
9	Peter Zijerveld (NED)	HB Alarmsystemen	s.t.
10	Régis Clère (FRA)	Miko–Mercier–Vivagel	s.t.

General classification after Stage 15a

Rank	Rider	Team	Time
1	Giovanni Battaglin (ITA)	Inoxpran	
2	Pedro Muñoz Machín Rodríguez (ESP)	Zor–Helios–Novostil	+ 1' 49"
3	Vicente Belda (ESP)	Kelme–Gios	+ 2' 10"

== Stage 15b ==
6 May 1981 — Zaragoza to Zaragoza, 11.3 km (7.0 mi) (ITT)

Stage 15b result

Rank	Rider	Team	Time
1	Régis Clère (FRA)	Miko–Mercier–Vivagel	15' 42"
2	Jørgen Marcussen (DEN)	Inoxpran	+ 9"
3	Giovanni Battaglin (ITA)	Inoxpran	+ 12"
4	Didier Lebaud (FRA)	Miko–Mercier–Vivagel	+ 26"
5	Kim Andersen (DEN)	Miko–Mercier–Vivagel	s.t.
6	Heddie Nieuwdorp (NED)	HB Alarmsystemen	s.t.
7	Vicente Belda (ESP)	Kelme–Gios	+ 27"
8	Pedro Muñoz Machín Rodríguez (ESP)	Zor–Helios–Novostil	+ 32"
9	Antonio Coll (ESP)	Colchón CR	+ 36"
10	Jos Schipper (NED)	HB Alarmsystemen	s.t.

General classification after Stage 15b

Rank	Rider	Team	Time
1	Giovanni Battaglin (ITA)	Inoxpran	79h 46' 26"
2	Pedro Muñoz Machín Rodríguez (ESP)	Zor–Helios–Novostil	+ 2' 07"
3	Vicente Belda (ESP)	Kelme–Gios	+ 2' 25"
4	Jørgen Marcussen (DEN)	Inoxpran	+ 3' 29"
5	Antonio Coll (ESP)	Colchón CR	+ 4' 22"
6	Ángel Arroyo (ESP)	Zor–Helios–Novostil	+ 5' 28"
7	Régis Clère (FRA)	Miko–Mercier–Vivagel	+ 6' 03"
8	José Luis Laguía (ESP)	Reynolds	s.t.
9	Rafael Ladrón de Guevara (ESP)	Kelme–Gios	+ 6' 28"
10	Faustino Rupérez (ESP)	Zor–Helios–Novostil	+ 7' 25"

== Stage 16 ==
7 May 1981 — Calatayud to Torrejón de Ardoz, 209 km (130 mi)

Stage 16 result

Rank	Rider	Team	Time
1	Álvaro Pino (ESP)	Colchón CR	6h 47' 12"
2	Francisco Javier Cedena (ESP)	Colchón CR	+ 8' 28"
3	Juan Fernández Martín (ESP)	Kelme–Gios	s.t.
4	Johan van der Meer (NED)	HB Alarmsystemen	s.t.
5	Jesús Suárez Cueva (ESP)	Kelme–Gios	s.t.
6	José Teixeira Rodríguez (ESP)	Manzaneque	s.t.
7	Wies van Dongen (NED)	HB Alarmsystemen	s.t.
8	Pierre-Henri Menthéour (FRA)	Miko–Mercier–Vivagel	s.t.
9	Frédéric Vichot (FRA)	Miko–Mercier–Vivagel	s.t.
10	Marc Revoul (FRA)	Miko–Mercier–Vivagel	s.t.

General classification after Stage 16

Rank	Rider	Team	Time
1	Giovanni Battaglin (ITA)	Inoxpran	86h 42' 06"
2	Pedro Muñoz Machín Rodríguez (ESP)	Zor–Helios–Novostil	+ 2' 07"
3	Vicente Belda (ESP)	Kelme–Gios	+ 2' 25"
4	Jørgen Marcussen (DEN)	Inoxpran	+ 3' 29"
5	Antonio Coll (ESP)	Colchón CR	+ 4' 22"
6	Ángel Arroyo (ESP)	Zor–Helios–Novostil	+ 5' 28"
7	Régis Clère (FRA)	Miko–Mercier–Vivagel	+ 5' 54"
8	José Luis Laguía (ESP)	Reynolds	+ 6' 03"
9	Faustino Rupérez (ESP)	Zor–Helios–Novostil	+ 7' 25"
10	Miguel María Lasa (ESP)	Zor–Helios–Novostil	+ 9' 25"

== Stage 17 ==
8 May 1981 — Torrejón de Ardoz to Segovia, 150 km (93 mi)

Stage 17 result

Rank	Rider	Team	Time
1	Miguel María Lasa (ESP)	Zor–Helios–Novostil	4h 05' 16"
2	José Luis Laguía (ESP)	Reynolds	s.t.
3	Régis Clère (FRA)	Miko–Mercier–Vivagel	s.t.
4	Antonio Coll (ESP)	Colchón CR	s.t.
5	Francisco Javier Cedena (ESP)	Colchón CR	s.t.
6	Peter Zijerveld (NED)	HB Alarmsystemen	s.t.
7	Eduardo Chozas (ESP)	Zor–Helios–Novostil	s.t.
8	Frédéric Vichot (FRA)	Miko–Mercier–Vivagel	s.t.
9	Juan Pujol Pagés (ESP)	Colchón CR	s.t.
10	Kim Andersen (DEN)	Miko–Mercier–Vivagel	s.t.

General classification after Stage 17

Rank	Rider	Team	Time
1	Giovanni Battaglin (ITA)	Inoxpran	90h 47' 22"
2	Pedro Muñoz Machín Rodríguez (ESP)	Zor–Helios–Novostil	+ 2' 07"
3	Vicente Belda (ESP)	Kelme–Gios	+ 2' 25"
4	Jørgen Marcussen (DEN)	Inoxpran	+ 3' 29"
5	Antonio Coll (ESP)	Colchón CR	+ 4' 22"
6	Ángel Arroyo (ESP)	Zor–Helios–Novostil	+ 5' 28"
7	Régis Clère (FRA)	Miko–Mercier–Vivagel	+ 5' 54"
8	José Luis Laguía (ESP)	Reynolds	+ 6' 03"
9	Faustino Rupérez (ESP)	Zor–Helios–Novostil	+ 7' 25"
10	Miguel María Lasa (ESP)	Zor–Helios–Novostil	+ 9' 25"

== Stage 18 ==
9 May 1981 — Segovia – Los Ángeles de San Rafael, 175 km (109 mi)

Stage 18 result

Rank	Rider	Team	Time
1	Ángel Arroyo (ESP)	Zor–Helios–Novostil	5h 19' 58"
2	Faustino Rupérez (ESP)	Zor–Helios–Novostil	+ 42"
3	Giovanni Battaglin (ITA)	Inoxpran	+ 58"
4	José Luis Laguía (ESP)	Reynolds	+ 1"
5	Pedro Muñoz Machín Rodríguez (ESP)	Zor–Helios–Novostil	s.t.
6	Antonio Coll (ESP)	Colchón CR	+ 1' 02"
7	Jørgen Marcussen (DEN)	Inoxpran	s.t.
8	Vicente Belda (ESP)	Kelme–Gios	s.t.
9	Enrique Martínez Heredia (ESP)	Colchón CR	+ 1' 04"
10	Anastasio Greciano (ESP)	Reynolds	+ 2' 19"

General classification after Stage 18

Rank	Rider	Team	Time
1	Giovanni Battaglin (ITA)	Inoxpran	96h 08' 18"
2	Pedro Muñoz Machín Rodríguez (ESP)	Zor–Helios–Novostil	+ 2' 09"
3	Vicente Belda (ESP)	Kelme–Gios	+ 2' 29"
4	Jørgen Marcussen (DEN)	Inoxpran	+ 3' 33"
5	Antonio Coll (ESP)	Colchón CR	+ 4' 26"
6	Ángel Arroyo (ESP)	Zor–Helios–Novostil	+ 4' 30"
7	José Luis Laguía (ESP)	Reynolds	+ 6' 05"
8	Faustino Rupérez (ESP)	Zor–Helios–Novostil	+ 7' 09"
9	Régis Clère (FRA)	Miko–Mercier–Vivagel	+ 7' 23"
10	Miguel María Lasa (ESP)	Zor–Helios–Novostil	+ 10' 54"

== Stage 19 ==
10 May 1981 — Madrid to Madrid, 84 km (52 mi)

Stage 19 result

Rank	Rider	Team	Time
1	Francisco Javier Cedena (ESP)	Colchón CR	1h 55' 22"
2	Jos Schipper (NED)	HB Alarmsystemen	s.t.
3	Pierre-Henri Menthéour (FRA)	Miko–Mercier–Vivagel	+ 47"
4	Johan van der Meer (NED)	HB Alarmsystemen	s.t.
5	Kim Andersen (DEN)	Miko–Mercier–Vivagel	s.t.
6	Gines García Pallares (ESP)	Kelme–Gios	s.t.
7	Juan Pujol Pagés (ESP)	Colchón CR	s.t.
8	Heddie Nieuwdorp (NED)	HB Alarmsystemen	+ 54"
9	Jesús Suárez Cueva (ESP)	Kelme–Gios	+ 1' 09"
10	José Luis Laguía (ESP)	Reynolds	s.t.

General classification after Stage 19

Rank	Rider	Team	Time
1	Giovanni Battaglin (ITA)	Inoxpran	98h 04' 49"
2	Pedro Muñoz Machín Rodríguez (ESP)	Zor–Helios–Novostil	+ 2' 09"
3	Vicente Belda (ESP)	Kelme–Gios	+ 2' 29"
4	Jørgen Marcussen (DEN)	Inoxpran	+ 3' 33"
5	Antonio Coll (ESP)	Colchón CR	+ 4' 26"
6	Ángel Arroyo (ESP)	Zor–Helios–Novostil	+ 4' 30"
7	José Luis Laguía (ESP)	Reynolds	+ 6' 05"
8	Faustino Rupérez (ESP)	Zor–Helios–Novostil	+ 7' 09"
9	Régis Clère (FRA)	Miko–Mercier–Vivagel	+ 7' 23"
10	Miguel María Lasa (ESP)	Zor–Helios–Novostil	+ 10' 54"
