= 1981 Vuelta a España, Prologue to Stage 9 =

Cycling race stages

The 1981 Vuelta a España was the 36th edition of the Vuelta a España, one of cycling's Grand Tours. The Vuelta began in Santander, with a prologue individual time trial on 21 April, and Stage 9 occurred on 30 April with a stage to Murcia. The race finished in Madrid on 10 May.

== Prologue ==
21 April 1981 — Santander to Santander, 6.3 km (3.9 mi) (ITT)

Prologue result and general classification after Prologue

Rank	Rider	Team	Time
1	Régis Clère (FRA)	Miko–Mercier–Vivagel	8' 26"
2	Jørgen Marcussen (DEN)	Inoxpran	+ 2"
3	Jos Lammertink (NED)	HB Alarmsystemen	+ 15"
4	Giovanni Battaglin (ITA)	Inoxpran	+ 17"
5	Wies van Dongen (NED)	HB Alarmsystemen	+ 21"
6	Ángel Arroyo (ESP)	Zor–Helios–Novostil	+ 22"
7	Jos Schipper (NED)	HB Alarmsystemen	+ 23"
8	José Luis Laguía (ESP)	Reynolds	+ 24"
9	Miguel María Lasa (ESP)	Zor–Helios–Novostil	s.t.
10	José Luis López Cerrón (ESP)	Zor–Helios–Novostil	+ 25"

== Stage 1 ==
22 April 1981 — Santander to Avilés, 221 km (137 mi)

Stage 1 result

Rank	Rider	Team	Time
1	Guido Bontempi (ITA)	Inoxpran	6h 20' 15"
2	Francisco Javier Cedena (ESP)	Colchón CR	s.t.
3	Manuel Murga Saez De Ormijana (ESP)	Kelme–Gios	s.t.
4	Régis Clère (FRA)	Miko–Mercier–Vivagel	s.t.
5	Miguel María Lasa (ESP)	Zor–Helios–Novostil	s.t.
6	Enrique Martínez Heredia (ESP)	Colchón CR	s.t.
7	Juan José Quintanilla (ESP)	Reynolds	s.t.
8	Johan van der Meer (NED)	HB Alarmsystemen	s.t.
9	José Luis Laguía (ESP)	Reynolds	s.t.
10	Ad van Peer (NED)	HB Alarmsystemen	s.t.

General classification after Stage 1

Rank	Rider	Team	Time
1	Régis Clère (FRA)	Miko–Mercier–Vivagel	6h 28' 41"
2	Jørgen Marcussen (DEN)	Inoxpran	+ 2"
3	Jos Lammertink (NED)	HB Alarmsystemen	+ 15"
4	Giovanni Battaglin (ITA)	Inoxpran	+ 17"
5	Wies van Dongen (NED)	HB Alarmsystemen	+ 21"
6	Ángel Arroyo (ESP)	Zor–Helios–Novostil	s.t.
7	Jos Schipper (NED)	HB Alarmsystemen	+ 23"
8	Miguel María Lasa (ESP)	Zor–Helios–Novostil	s.t.
9	José Luis Laguía (ESP)	Reynolds	+ 24"
10	José Luis López Cerrón (ESP)	Zor–Helios–Novostil	+ 25"

== Stage 2 ==
23 April 1981 — Avilés to León, 159 km (99 mi)

Stage 2 result

Rank	Rider	Team	Time
1	Alfredo Chinetti (ITA)	Inoxpran	4h 36' 01"
2	Francisco Javier Cedena (ESP)	Colchón CR	s.t.
3	Miguel María Lasa (ESP)	Zor–Helios–Novostil	s.t.
4	Giovanni Battaglin (ITA)	Inoxpran	s.t.
5	José Luis Laguía (ESP)	Reynolds	s.t.
6	Enrique Martínez Heredia (ESP)	Colchón CR	s.t.
7	Manuel Murga Saez De Ormijana (ESP)	Kelme–Gios	s.t.
8	Ángel Camarillo (ESP)	Zor–Helios–Novostil	s.t.
9	Régis Clère (FRA)	Miko–Mercier–Vivagel	s.t.
10	Per Bausager (DEN)	Inoxpran	s.t.

General classification after Stage 2

Rank	Rider	Team	Time
1	Régis Clère (FRA)	Miko–Mercier–Vivagel	11h 04' 42"
2	Jørgen Marcussen (DEN)	Inoxpran	+ 2"
3	Giovanni Battaglin (ITA)	Inoxpran	+ 17"
4	Ángel Arroyo (ESP)	Zor–Helios–Novostil	+ 22"
5	Miguel María Lasa (ESP)	Zor–Helios–Novostil	+ 24"
6	José Luis Laguía (ESP)	Reynolds	s.t.
7	José Luis López Cerrón (ESP)	Zor–Helios–Novostil	+ 25"
8	Manuel Murga Saez De Ormijana (ESP)	Kelme–Gios	+ 26"
9	Rafael Ladrón (ESP)	Kelme–Gios	+ 27"
10	Pedro Muñoz Machín Rodríguez (ESP)	Zor–Helios–Novostil	+ 30"

== Stage 3 ==
24 April 1981 — León to Salamanca, 195 km (121 mi)

Stage 3 result

Rank	Rider	Team	Time
1	Guido Bontempi (ITA)	Inoxpran	5h 25' 58"
2	Francisco Javier Cedena (ESP)	Colchón CR	s.t.
3	Jesús Suárez Cueva (ESP)	Kelme–Gios	s.t.
4	Juan Fernández Martín (ESP)	Kelme–Gios	s.t.
5	José Luis Laguía (ESP)	Reynolds	s.t.
6	Heddie Nieuwdorp (NED)	HB Alarmsystemen	s.t.
7	Frédéric Vichot (FRA)	Miko–Mercier–Vivagel	s.t.
8	Alfredo Chinetti (ITA)	Inoxpran	s.t.
9	Wies van Dongen (NED)	HB Alarmsystemen	s.t.
10	Erich Jagsch (AUT)	Colchón CR	s.t.

General classification after Stage 3

Rank	Rider	Team	Time
1	Régis Clère (FRA)	Miko–Mercier–Vivagel	16h 30' 40"
2	Jørgen Marcussen (DEN)	Inoxpran	+ 2"
3	Giovanni Battaglin (ITA)	Inoxpran	+ 17"
4	Ángel Arroyo (ESP)	Zor–Helios–Novostil	+ 22"
5	José Luis Laguía (ESP)	Reynolds	+ 24"
6	Miguel María Lasa (ESP)	Zor–Helios–Novostil	s.t.
7	José Luis López Cerrón (ESP)	Zor–Helios–Novostil	+ 25"
8	Manuel Murga Saez De Ormijana (ESP)	Kelme–Gios	+ 26"
9	Rafael Ladrón (ESP)	Kelme–Gios	+ 28"
10	Pedro Muñoz Machín Rodríguez (ESP)	Zor–Helios–Novostil	+ 30"

== Stage 4 ==
25 April 1981 — Salamanca to Cáceres, 206 km (128 mi)

Stage 4 result

Rank	Rider	Team	Time
1	Celestino Prieto (ESP)	Kelme–Gios	5h 44' 49"
2	Pedro Muñoz Machín Rodríguez (ESP)	Zor–Helios–Novostil	s.t.
3	Jesús Suárez Cueva (ESP)	Kelme–Gios	s.t.
4	Juan Fernández Martín (ESP)	Kelme–Gios	s.t.
5	Miguel María Lasa (ESP)	Zor–Helios–Novostil	s.t.
6	Francisco Javier Cedena (ESP)	Colchón CR	s.t.
7	Enrique Martínez Heredia (ESP)	Colchón CR	s.t.
8	Gérald Oberson (SUI)	Miko–Mercier–Vivagel	s.t.
9	Félix Pérez Moreno (ESP)	Manzaneque	s.t.
10	Johan van der Meer (NED)	HB Alarmsystemen	s.t.

General classification after Stage 4

Rank	Rider	Team	Time
1	Régis Clère (FRA)	Miko–Mercier–Vivagel	22h 15' 34"
2	Jørgen Marcussen (DEN)	Inoxpran	+ 2"
3	Giovanni Battaglin (ITA)	Inoxpran	+ 17"
4	Ángel Arroyo (ESP)	Zor–Helios–Novostil	+ 22"
5	Miguel María Lasa (ESP)	Zor–Helios–Novostil	+ 24"
6	José Luis Laguía (ESP)	Reynolds	s.t.
7	Pedro Muñoz Machín Rodríguez (ESP)	Zor–Helios–Novostil	+ 25"
8	José Luis López Cerrón (ESP)	Zor–Helios–Novostil	s.t.
9	Manuel Murga Saez De Ormijana (ESP)	Kelme–Gios	+ 26"
10	Rafael Ladrón (ESP)	Kelme–Gios	+ 27"

== Stage 5 ==
26 April 1981 — Cáceres to Mérida, 152 km (94 mi)

Stage 5 result

Rank	Rider	Team	Time
1	Heddie Nieuwdorp (NED)	HB Alarmsystemen	3h 23' 53"
2	Juan Fernández Martín (ESP)	Kelme–Gios	+ 2' 40"
3	Hans Vonk (NED)	HB Alarmsystemen	s.t.
4	Jos Lammertink (NED)	HB Alarmsystemen	s.t.
5	Wies van Dongen (NED)	HB Alarmsystemen	s.t.
6	Jesús Suárez Cueva (ESP)	Kelme–Gios	s.t.
7	Enrique Martínez Heredia (ESP)	Colchón CR	s.t.
8	Francisco Javier Cedena (ESP)	Colchón CR	s.t.
9	Ángel Camarillo (ESP)	Zor–Helios–Novostil	s.t.
10	Félix Pérez Moreno (ESP)	Manzaneque	s.t.

General classification after Stage 5

Rank	Rider	Team	Time
1	Régis Clère (FRA)	Miko–Mercier–Vivagel	25h 42' 02"
2	Jørgen Marcussen (DEN)	Inoxpran	+ 2"
3	Giovanni Battaglin (ITA)	Inoxpran	+ 17"
4	Ángel Arroyo (ESP)	Zor–Helios–Novostil	+ 22"
5	Miguel María Lasa (ESP)	Zor–Helios–Novostil	+ 24"
6	Pedro Muñoz Machín Rodríguez (ESP)	Zor–Helios–Novostil	+ 25"
7	José Luis López Cerrón (ESP)	Zor–Helios–Novostil	s.t.
8	Manuel Murga Saez De Ormijana (ESP)	Kelme–Gios	+ 26"
9	Rafael Ladrón (ESP)	Kelme–Gios	+ 28"
10	Enrique Martínez Heredia (ESP)	Colchón CR	+ 32"

== Stage 6 ==
27 April 1981 — Mérida to Seville, 199 km (124 mi)

Stage 6 result

Rank	Rider	Team	Time
1	Jos Lammertink (NED)	HB Alarmsystemen	5h 19' 23"
2	Alfredo Chinetti (ITA)	Inoxpran	s.t.
3	Juan Fernández Martín (ESP)	Kelme–Gios	s.t.
4	Manuel Murga Saez De Ormijana (ESP)	Kelme–Gios	s.t.
5	Jesús Suárez Cueva (ESP)	Kelme–Gios	s.t.
6	Frédéric Vichot (FRA)	Miko–Mercier–Vivagel	s.t.
7	Francisco Javier Cedena (ESP)	Colchón CR	s.t.
8	Enrique Martínez Heredia (ESP)	Colchón CR	s.t.
9	Heddie Nieuwdorp (NED)	HB Alarmsystemen	s.t.
10	Johan van der Meer (NED)	HB Alarmsystemen	s.t.

General classification after Stage 6

Rank	Rider	Team	Time
1	Régis Clère (FRA)	Miko–Mercier–Vivagel	
2	Jørgen Marcussen (DEN)	Inoxpran	+ 2"
3	Giovanni Battaglin (ITA)	Inoxpran	+ 17"

== Stage 7 ==
28 April 1981 — Écija to Jaén, 181 km (112 mi)

Stage 7 result

Rank	Rider	Team	Time
1	Juan Fernández Martín (ESP)	Kelme–Gios	5h 17' 56"
2	Miguel María Lasa (ESP)	Zor–Helios–Novostil	s.t.
3	Francisco Javier Cedena (ESP)	Colchón CR	s.t.
4	Gérald Oberson (SUI)	Miko–Mercier–Vivagel	s.t.
5	Frédéric Vichot (FRA)	Miko–Mercier–Vivagel	s.t.
6	Didier Lebaud (FRA)	Miko–Mercier–Vivagel	s.t.
7	Félix Pérez Moreno (ESP)	Manzaneque	s.t.
8	Ángel Camarillo (ESP)	Zor–Helios–Novostil	s.t.
9	Alfredo Chinetti (ITA)	Inoxpran	s.t.
10	Heddie Nieuwdorp (NED)	HB Alarmsystemen	s.t.

General classification after Stage 7

Rank	Rider	Team	Time
1	Régis Clère (FRA)	Miko–Mercier–Vivagel	36h 19' 21"
2	Jørgen Marcussen (DEN)	Inoxpran	+ 2"
3	Giovanni Battaglin (ITA)	Inoxpran	+ 17"
4	Ángel Arroyo (ESP)	Zor–Helios–Novostil	+ 22"
5	Miguel María Lasa (ESP)	Zor–Helios–Novostil	+ 24"
6	Pedro Muñoz Machín Rodríguez (ESP)	Zor–Helios–Novostil	+ 25"
7	José Luis López Cerrón (ESP)	Zor–Helios–Novostil	s.t.
8	Manuel Murga Saez De Ormijana (ESP)	Kelme–Gios	+ 26"
9	Rafael Ladrón (ESP)	Kelme–Gios	+ 28"
10	Enrique Martínez Heredia (ESP)	Colchón CR	+ 32"

== Stage 8a ==
29 April 1981 — Jaén to Granada, 100 km (62 mi)

Stage 8a result

Rank	Rider	Team	Time
1	José María Yurrebaso (ESP)	Manzaneque	2h 41' 09"
2	Jos Lammertink (NED)	HB Alarmsystemen	+ 1' 49"
3	Hans Vonk (NED)	HB Alarmsystemen	s.t.
4	Miguel María Lasa (ESP)	Zor–Helios–Novostil	s.t.
5	Frédéric Vichot (FRA)	Miko–Mercier–Vivagel	s.t.
6	Erich Jagsch (AUT)	Colchón CR	s.t.
7	Wies van Dongen (NED)	HB Alarmsystemen	s.t.
8	Jesús Guzmán Delgado (ESP)	Kelme–Gios	s.t.
9	Johan van der Meer (NED)	HB Alarmsystemen	s.t.
10	Jesús Suárez Cueva (ESP)	Kelme–Gios	s.t.

General classification after Stage 8a

Rank	Rider	Team	Time
1	Régis Clère (FRA)	Miko–Mercier–Vivagel	
2	Jørgen Marcussen (DEN)	Inoxpran	+ 2"
3	Giovanni Battaglin (ITA)	Inoxpran	+ 17"

== Stage 8b ==
29 April 1981 — Granada to Sierra Nevada, 30.5 km (19.0 mi) (ITT)

Stage 8b result

Rank	Rider	Team	Time
1	Giovanni Battaglin (ITA)	Inoxpran	1h 11' 02"
2	Pedro Muñoz Machín Rodríguez (ESP)	Zor–Helios–Novostil	+ 43"
3	Jørgen Marcussen (DEN)	Inoxpran	+ 53"
4	Vicente Belda (ESP)	Kelme–Gios	+ 2' 20"
5	Antonio Coll (ESP)	Colchón CR	+ 2' 34"
6	Ángel Arroyo (ESP)	Zor–Helios–Novostil	+ 3' 03"
7	José Luis Laguía (ESP)	Reynolds	+ 3' 11"
8	Rafael Ladrón (ESP)	Kelme–Gios	+ 3' 37"
9	Régis Clère (FRA)	Miko–Mercier–Vivagel	+ 3' 55"
10	José Luis López Cerrón (ESP)	Zor–Helios–Novostil	+ 4' 09"

General classification after Stage 8b

Rank	Rider	Team	Time
1	Giovanni Battaglin (ITA)	Inoxpran	40h 13' 38"
2	Jørgen Marcussen (DEN)	Inoxpran	+ 48"
3	Pedro Muñoz Machín Rodríguez (ESP)	Zor–Helios–Novostil	+ 51"
4	Vicente Belda (ESP)	Kelme–Gios	+ 2' 46"
5	Antonio Coll (ESP)	Colchón CR	+ 3' 02"
6	Ángel Arroyo (ESP)	Zor–Helios–Novostil	+ 3' 08"
7	Régis Clère (FRA)	Miko–Mercier–Vivagel	+ 3' 38"
8	Rafael Ladrón (ESP)	Kelme–Gios	+ 3' 48"
9	José Luis Laguía (ESP)	Reynolds	+ 4' 15"
10	José Luis López Cerrón (ESP)	Zor–Helios–Novostil	+ 4' 17"

== Stage 9 ==
30 April 1981 — Baza to Murcia, 204 km (127 mi)

Stage 9 result

Rank	Rider	Team	Time
1	Manuel Murga Saez De Ormijana (ESP)	Kelme–Gios	5h 37' 36"
2	Frédéric Vichot (FRA)	Miko–Mercier–Vivagel	+ 43"
3	Antonio Coll (ESP)	Colchón CR	+ 52"
4	Régis Clère (FRA)	Miko–Mercier–Vivagel	s.t.
5	Per Bausager (DEN)	Inoxpran	s.t.
6	Francisco Javier Cedena (ESP)	Colchón CR	s.t.
7	José Luis Laguía (ESP)	Reynolds	s.t.
8	Alfredo Chinetti (ITA)	Inoxpran	s.t.
9	Vicente Belda (ESP)	Kelme–Gios	s.t.
10	Gines García Pallares (ESP)	Kelme–Gios	s.t.

General classification after Stage 9

Rank	Rider	Team	Time
1	Giovanni Battaglin (ITA)	Inoxpran	45h 52' 06"
2	Pedro Muñoz Machín Rodríguez (ESP)	Zor–Helios–Novostil	+ 51"
3	Jørgen Marcussen (DEN)	Inoxpran	+ 1' 31"
4	Vicente Belda (ESP)	Kelme–Gios	+ 2' 46"
5	Antonio Coll (ESP)	Colchón CR	+ 3' 02"
6	Ángel Arroyo (ESP)	Zor–Helios–Novostil	+ 3' 08"
7	Régis Clère (FRA)	Miko–Mercier–Vivagel	+ 3' 38"
8	José Luis Laguía (ESP)	Reynolds	+ 4' 15"
9	Rafael Ladrón (ESP)	Kelme–Gios	+ 4' 41"
10	José Luis López Cerrón (ESP)	Zor–Helios–Novostil	+ 5' 10"
