= 1981 Volta a la Comunitat Valenciana =

Race details
- Dates: 3–8 March 1981
- Stages: 5 + Prologue
- Winning time: 20h 57' 48"

Results
	Winner	Alberto Fernández (ESP)	(Teka–Campagnolo)
	Second	Pedro Muñoz (ESP)	(Zor–Helios–Novostil)
	Third	Antonio Coll (ESP)	(Colchón CR)

The 1981 Volta a la Comunitat Valenciana was the 39th edition of the Volta a la Comunitat Valenciana road cycling stage race, which was held from 3 March to 8 March 1981. The race started in Vinaròs and finished in Valencia. The race was won by Alberto Fernández of the Teka–Campagnolo team.

== General classification ==
Final general classification

Rank	Rider	Team	Time
1	Alberto Fernández (ESP)	Teka–Campagnolo	20h 57' 48"
2	Pedro Muñoz (ESP)	Zor–Helios–Novostil	+ 9"
3	Antonio Coll (ESP)	Colchón CR	+ 19"
4	Bernardo Alfonsel (ESP)	Teka–Campagnolo	+ 25"
5	Ángel Arroyo (ESP)	Zor–Helios–Novostil	+ 28"
6	Vicente Belda (ESP)	Kelme–Gios	+ 30"
7	Jose-Maria Gonzalez Barcala (ESP)	Zor–Helios–Novostil	s.t.
8	José Luis Laguía (ESP)	Reynolds	+ 50"
9	Eulalio García (ESP)	Teka–Campagnolo	+ 1' 01"
10	José Viejo (ESP)	Teka–Campagnolo	+ 1' 04"
