= 1981 Tour of the Basque Country =

Race details
- Dates: 6–10 April 1981
- Stages: 5
- Distance: 812.6 km (504.9 mi)
- Winning time: 22h 07' 30"

Results
	Winner	Silvano Contini (ITA)	(Bianchi–Piaggio)
	Second	Mario Beccia (ITA)	(Santini–Selle Italia)
	Third	Marino Lejarreta (ESP)	(Teka–Campagnolo)

The 1981 Tour of the Basque Country was the 21st edition of the Tour of the Basque Country cycle race and was held from 6 April to 10 April 1981. The race started in Lazkao and finished at Iturriotz. The race was won by Silvano Contini of the Bianchi team.

== General classification ==
Final general classification

Rank	Rider	Team	Time
1	Silvano Contini (ITA)	Bianchi–Piaggio	22h 07' 30"
2	Mario Beccia (ITA)	Santini–Selle Italia	+ 33"
3	Marino Lejarreta (ESP)	Teka–Campagnolo	+ 40"
4	José Luis Laguía (ESP)	Reynolds	+ 1' 07"
5	Eulalio García (ESP)	Teka–Campagnolo	+ 1' 14"
6	Pedro Muñoz (ESP)	Zor–Helios–Novostil	+ 1' 16"
7	Ismael Lejarreta (ESP)	Teka–Campagnolo	+ 1' 42"
8	Ángel Arroyo (ESP)	Zor–Helios–Novostil	+ 1' 58"
9	Manuel Esparza (ESP)	Teka–Campagnolo	+ 2' 19"
10	Claudio Bortolotto (ITA)	Santini–Selle Italia	+ 8' 02"
