= Juan Fernández (cyclist) =

Spanish cyclist

Personal information
- Full name: Juan Fernández Martín
- Born: 5 January 1957 (age 69) Alhama de Granada, Spain

Cycling career
- Sport: Cycling
- Discipline: Road
- Role: Rider; Manager

Professional teams
- 1979: Kas–Campagnolo
- 1980: Fosforera–Vereco MG
- 1981–1982: Kelme–Gios
- 1983–1986: Zor–Gemeaz Cusin
- 1987–1988: Zahor Chocolates

Managerial teams
- 1989–1993: CLAS
- 1994–1996: Mapei–CLAS
- 1999–2001: Festina–Lotus
- 2002: Team Coast
- 2005–2006: Phonak

Major wins
- Grand Tours Giro d'Italia 1 individual stage (1980) Vuelta a España Mountains classification (1980) 4 individual stages (1981, 1982, 1983, 1987) One-day races and Classics National Road Race Championships (1980, 1988)
Medal record
Representing Spain
Men's road bicycle racing
World Championships
Bronze medal – third place	1980 Sallanches	Elite Men's Road Race
Bronze medal – third place	1987 Villach	Elite Men's Road Race
Bronze medal – third place	1988 Ronse	Elite Men's Road Race

Juan Fernández Martín (born 5 January 1957) is a Spanish former professional road racing cyclist and directeur sportif. During his career, he won four stages at the Vuelta a España, as well as the Mountains classification in 1980. He also finished third in the World Cycling Championships three times and won the Spanish National Road Race Championship in 1980 and 1988.

== Major results ==
1979
1st GP Navarra
1st Stage 1a Escalada a Montjuïc
9th Rund um den Henninger Turm
1980
1st Road race, National Road Championships
1st Overall GP Navarra

1st Stage 1

1st Klasika Primavera
1st Stage 8 Giro d'Italia
1st Stage 1 Vuelta a Asturias
1st Mountains classification, Vuelta a España
3rd Road race, UCI Road World Championships
6th Overall Escalada a Montjuïc

1st Stage 1b

10th Overall Volta a Catalunya

1st Prologue & Stage 6

1981
1st GP Pascuas
1st Stage 7 Vuelta a España
1st Stage 3 Vuelta a las Tres Provincias
1st Stage 2 Vuelta a los Valles Mineros
Tour of the Basque Country

1st Stages 1 & 2

2nd Overall Vuelta a Aragón

1st Stage 1

3rd Road race, National Road Championships
3rd Overall Vuelta a La Rioja

1st Stage 2

3rd Coppa Agostoni
3rd Trofeo Luis Puig
5th Tre Valli Varesine
7th Overall Deutschland Tour

1st Stage 1

7th Clásica de San Sebastián
10th Overall Escalada a Montjuïc
1982
1st Stage 18 Vuelta a España
1st Stage 2 Vuelta a Asturias
1st Stage 5 Vuelta a las Tres Provincias
1st Stage 3 Vuelta a La Rioja
2nd GP Navarra
3rd Klasika Primavera
4th Trofeo Luis Puig
6th Trofeo Masferrer
7th Road race, UCI Road World Championships
8th Overall Tour of the Basque Country
10th Overall Vuelta a Burgos
1983
1st GP Navarra
1st Klasika Primavera
1st Stage 1 Vuelta a España
Tour of the Basque Country

1st Points classification
1st Stage 2

6th Milan–San Remo
9th Overall Vuelta a Andalucía
10th Overall Vuelta a las Tres Provincias
1984
1st Mountains classification, Vuelta a Burgos
2nd Clásica a los Puertos
8th Road race, National Road Championships
1985
1st Clásica a los Puertos
1st Stage 4 Vuelta a Asturias
1st Stage 3 Vuelta a Cantabria
3rd Clásica de San Sebastián
6th Road race, UCI Road World Championships
9th Road race, National Road Championships
1986
Volta a Catalunya

1st Mountains classification
1st Stage 4

1st Stage 7 Vuelta a Castilla y León
3rd Clásica de San Sebastián
4th Road race, UCI Road World Championships
1987
1st Stage 14 Vuelta a España
3rd Road race, UCI Road World Championships
6th Road race, National Road Championships
10th Overall Setmana Catalana de Ciclisme
1988
1st Road race, National Road Championships
3rd Road race, UCI Road World Championships

=== Grand Tour general classification results timeline ===
Grand Tour	1979	1980	1981	1982	1983	1984	1985	1986	1987	1988
Vuelta a España	—	16	DNF	20	DNF	DNF	DNF	DNF	70	—
Giro d'Italia	—	24	—	37	DNF	122	—	—	94	DNF
Tour de France	—	—	50	—	—	—	DNF	DNF	—	—

=== Major championship results timeline ===
	1979	1980	1981	1982	1983	1984	1985	1986	1987	1988
World Championships	DNF	3	55	7	—	18	6	4	3	3
National Championships	11	1	3	—	—	8	9	20	6	1

Legend
—	Did not compete
DNF	Did not finish
