= 1979 Volta a Catalunya =

Race details
- Dates: 5–12 September 1979
- Stages: 7 + Prologue
- Distance: 1,256.4 km (780.7 mi)
- Winning time: 35h 58' 45"

Results
	Winner	Vicente Belda (ESP)	(Transmallorca–Flavia)
	Second	Pedro Vilardebó (ESP)	(Kas–Campagnolo)
	Third	Christian Jourdan (FRA)	(La Redoute–Motobécane)
	Points	Pedro Vilardebó (ESP)	(Kas–Campagnolo)
	Mountains	Manuel Esparza (ESP)	(Teka)
	Sprints	Christian Muselet (FRA)	(La Redoute–Motobécane)
	Team	Kas–Campagnolo	

The 1979 Volta a Catalunya was the 59th edition of the Volta a Catalunya cycle race and was held from 5 September to 12 September 1979. The race started and finished in Sitges. The race was won by Vicente Belda of the Transmallorca–Flavia team.

== General classification ==
Final general classification

Rank	Rider	Team	Time
1	Vicente Belda (ESP)	Transmallorca–Flavia	35h 58' 45"
2	Pedro Vilardebó (ESP)	Kas–Campagnolo	+ 02"
3	Christian Jourdan (FRA)	La Redoute–Motobécane	+ 09"
4	Pedro Torres (ESP)	Transmallorca–Flavia	+ 1' 01"
5	Joseph Fuchs (SUI)	Scic–Bottecchia	+ 2' 28"
6	Lucien Van Impe (BEL)	Kas–Campagnolo	+ 2' 36"
7	Jordi Fortià (ESP)	Novostil–Helios	+ 8' 18"
8	Ángel Arroyo (ESP)	Moliner–Vereco	+ 9' 13"
9	Manuel Esparza (ESP)	Teka	+ 10' 38"
10	Ricardo Zúñiga (ESP)	Manzaneque–Tam Atun	+ 11' 50"
