= 1983 Tour of the Basque Country =

Race details
- Dates: 4–8 April 1983
- Stages: 5
- Distance: 866 km (538.1 mi)
- Winning time: 23h 05' 31"

Results
	Winner	Julián Gorospe (ESP)	(Reynolds)
	Second	Roberto Visentini (ITA)	(Inoxpran)
	Third	Marino Lejarreta (ESP)	(Alfa Lum–Olmo)

The 1983 Tour of the Basque Country was the 23rd edition of the Tour of the Basque Country cycle race and was held from 4 April to 8 April 1983. The race started in Legorreta and finished at Errezil. The race was won by Julián Gorospe of the Reynolds team.

== General classification ==
Final general classification

Rank	Rider	Team	Time
1	Julián Gorospe (ESP)	Reynolds	23h 05' 31"
2	Roberto Visentini (ITA)	Inoxpran	+ 36"
3	Marino Lejarreta (ESP)	Alfa Lum–Olmo	+ 38"
4	Vicente Belda (ESP)	Kelme	+ 1' 02"
5	Felipe Yáñez (ESP)	Teka	+ 1' 02"
6	Juan-Carlos Alonso (ESP)	Teka	+ 1' 02"
7	Faustino Rupérez (ESP)	Zor–Gemeaz Cusin	+ 1' 07"
8	Alberto Fernández (ESP)	Zor–Gemeaz Cusin	+ 1' 16"
9	Giovanni Battaglin (ITA)	Inoxpran	+ 1' 36"
10	José Recio (ESP)	Kelme	+ 1' 42"
