= 1980 Volta a Catalunya =

Race details
- Dates: 3–10 September 1980
- Stages: 7 + Prologue
- Distance: 1,191.6 km (740.4 mi)
- Winning time: 33h 43' 02"

Results
	Winner	Marino Lejarreta (ESP)	(Teka)
	Second	Johan van der Velde (NED)	(TI–Raleigh–Creda)
	Third	Vicente Belda (ESP)	(Kelme–Gios)
	Points	Johan van der Velde (NED)	(TI–Raleigh–Creda)
	Mountains	Marino Lejarreta (ESP)	(Teka)
	Sprints	José Luis Blanco (ESP)	(Henninger-Aquila Rossa)
	Team	Teka	

The 1980 Volta a Catalunya was the 60th edition of the Volta a Catalunya cycle race and was held from 3 September to 10 September 1980. The race started in Sant Carles de la Ràpita and finished at L'Hospitalet. The race was won by Marino Lejarreta of the Teka team.

== General classification ==
Final general classification

Rank	Rider	Team	Time
1	Marino Lejarreta (ESP)	Teka	33h 43' 02"
2	Johan van der Velde (NED)	TI–Raleigh–Creda	+ 34"
3	Vicente Belda (ESP)	Kelme–Gios	+ 2' 18"
4	Faustino Rupérez (ESP)	Zor–Vereco	+ 2' 44"
5	Antonio Coll (ESP)	Colchón CR	+ 2' 53"
6	Sven-Åke Nilsson (SWE)	Miko–Mercier–Vivagel	+ 3' 39"
7	Ismael Lejarreta (ESP)	Teka	+ 3' 42"
8	Alberto Fernández (ESP)	Teka	+ 3' 58"
9	José Luis Viejo (ESP)	Teka	+ 4' 17"
10	Juan Fernández (ESP)	Kelme–Gios	+ 5' 32"
