= Jesús Suárez Cueva =

Spanish cyclist

Personal information
- Full name: Jesús Suárez Cueva
- Born: 10 March 1955 (age 71) Bobes, Spain

Cycling career
- Sport: Cycling
- Current team: Retired
- Discipline: Road
- Role: Rider

Professional teams
- 1977: Teka
- 1978–1979: Kas–Campagnolo
- 1980: Fosforera–Vereco MG
- 1981: Kelme–Gios
- 1982: Reynolds
- 1983–1988: Hueso
- 1989: Lotus–Zahor

Jesús Suárez Cueva (born 10 March 1955 in Bobes) is a Spanish former professional racing cyclist.

== Major results ==
1977
1st Trofeo Elola
1978
1st Overall Vuelta a Aragón
1st Overall GP Leganés
2nd Klasika Primavera
2nd Trofeo Masferrer
1979
1st Stage 2 Setmana Catalana de Ciclisme
1st Stage 7 Volta a Catalunya
1st Stage 3 Vuelta a Cantabria
1st Stage 4 Vuelta a Asturias
2nd GP Pascuas
3rd Klasika Primavera
1980
1st Overall Vuelta a La Rioja
1st Stage 7B Volta a Catalunya
1st Stage 2 Tour of the Basque Country
2nd GP Pascuas
1981
1st Stage 5 Vuelta a Cantabria
1st Stage 11 Vuelta a España
1st Stage 2 Vuelta a Asturias
2nd Trofeo Luis Puig
6th Overall Vuelta a Andalucía
7th Subida al Naranco
9th Overall Volta a Catalunya
1982
1st Klasika Primavera
1983
1st Stage 7 Vuelta a España
1984
1st Stage 18 Vuelta a España
1st Stage 7 Herald Sun Tour
2nd Trofeo Masferrer
1985
1st Stage 10 Herald Sun Tour
1st Stage 6 Vuelta a Cantabria
3rd Trofeo Masferrer
1986
10th Subida al Naranco
1989
2nd National Road Race Championships
