= 1987 Vuelta a Murcia =

Race details
- Dates: 3–8 March 1987
- Stages: 5 + Prologue
- Distance: 774.6 km (481.3 mi)
- Winning time: 18h 56' 23"

Results
	Winner	Pello Ruiz Cabestany (ESP)
	Second	Carlos Hernández Bailo (ESP)
	Third	Mariano Sánchez Martinez (ESP)

The 1987 Vuelta a Murcia was the third edition of the Vuelta a Murcia cycle race and was held on 3 March to 8 March 1987. The race started in Águilas and finished in Murcia. The race was won by Pello Ruiz Cabestany.

== General classification ==
Final general classification

Rank	Rider	Time
1	Pello Ruiz Cabestany (ESP)	18h 56' 23"
2	Carlos Hernández Bailo (ESP)	+ 1"
3	Mariano Sánchez Martinez (ESP)	+ 2"
4	Vicente Belda (ESP)	+ 5"
5	Antonio Coll (ESP)	+ 22"
6	Jesús Montoya (ESP)	+ 24"
7	Marino Lejarreta (ESP)	+ 33"
8	Jokin Mújika (ESP)	+ 37"
9	Laudelino Cubino (ESP)	+ 42"
10	Francisco Espinosa (ESP)	+ 1' 15"
