= 1980 Tour of the Basque Country =

Race details
- Dates: 7–11 April 1980
- Stages: 5
- Distance: 907.2 km (563.7 mi)
- Winning time: 24h 57' 56"

Results
	Winner	Alberto Fernández (ESP)	(Teka)
	Second	Miguel María Lasa (ESP)	(Fosforera–Vereco MG)
	Third	Marino Lejarreta (ESP)	(Teka)

The 1980 Tour of the Basque Country was the 20th edition of the Tour of the Basque Country cycle race and was held from 7 April to 11 April 1980. The race started in Urretxu and finished at Elosua. The race was won by Alberto Fernández of the Teka team.

== General classification ==
Final general classification

Rank	Rider	Team	Time
1	Alberto Fernández (ESP)	Teka	24h 57' 56"
2	Miguel María Lasa (ESP)	Fosforera–Vereco MG	+ 47"
3	Marino Lejarreta (ESP)	Teka	+ 1' 32"
4	Faustino Rupérez (ESP)	Fosforera–Vereco MG	+ 1' 36"
5	José Luis Laguía (ESP)	Reynolds	+ 1' 41"
6	Pedro Vilardebó (ESP)	Flavia–Gios	+ 1' 50"
7	Jørgen Marcussen (DEN)	Inoxpran	+ 2' 40"
8	José Nazabal (ESP)	Teka	+ 4' 00"
9	Julián Andiano (ESP)	Fosforera–Vereco MG	+ 6' 36"
10	José Luis Mayoz (ESP)	Teka	+ 7' 54"
