= 1983 Clásica de San Sebastián =

Race details
- Dates: 17 August 1983
- Stages: 1
- Distance: 244 km (151.6 mi)
- Winning time: 6h 22' 54"

Results
	Winner	Claude Criquielion (BEL)
	Second	Antonio Coll (ESP)
	Third	Reimund Dietzen (FRG)

The 1983 Clásica de San Sebastián was the third edition of the Clásica de San Sebastián cycle race and was held on 17 August 1983. The race started and finished in San Sebastián. The race was won by Claude Criquielion.

== General classification ==
Final general classification

Rank	Rider	Time
1	Claude Criquielion (BEL)	6h 22' 54"
2	Antonio Coll (ESP)	+ 14"
3	Reimund Dietzen (FRG)	+ 14"
4	Pedro Delgado (ESP)	+ 14"
5	Faustino Rupérez (ESP)	+ 14"
6	Carlos Hernández Bailo (ESP)	+ 14"
7	Stephen Roche (IRL)	+ 14"
8	Ángel Arroyo (ESP)	+ 14"
9	José Recio (ESP)	+ 14"
10	Jesús Rodríguez Magro (ESP)	+ 21"
