= Hans Vonk =

Hans Vonk may refer to:

- Hans Vonk (conductor), Dutch conductor
- Hans Vonk (cyclist), Dutch cyclist
- Hans Vonk (footballer), South African football (soccer) player of Dutch descent
