= Jordi Fortià =

Spanish cyclist

Personal information
- Full name: Jordi Fortià Martí
- Born: 16 September 1955 (age 71) Flaçà, Spain

Cycling career
- Sport: Cycling
- Current team: Retired
- Discipline: Road
- Role: Rider

Professional teams
- 1977–1979: Novostil–Gios
- 1980–1981: Kelme–Gios

Jordi Fortià Martí (born 16 September 1955) is a Spanish former professional racing cyclist. He rode in the 1980 Tour de France.

== Major results ==
1977
3rd Road race, National Road Championships
3rd Vuelta a los Valles Mineros
5th GP Pascuas
6th Overall Tour of the Basque Country
9th Subida a Arrate
1979
4th Trofeo Masferrer
7th Overall Volta a Catalunya
1980
1st Trofeo Elola
3rd Overall Volta a la Comunitat Valenciana
3rd GP Villafranca de Ordizia
1981
2nd Vuelta a los Valles Mineros
9th Trofeo Masferrer

=== Grand Tour general classification results timeline ===
Grand Tour	1977	1978	1979	1980	1981
Giro d'Italia	—	—	—	—	—
Tour de France	—	—	—	80	42
Vuelta a España	42	—	—	34	46
