= 1986 Vuelta a Murcia =

Race details
- Dates: 25 February–2 March 1986
- Stages: 5 + Prologue
- Distance: 717.5 km (445.8 mi)
- Winning time: 17h 32' 19"

Results
	Winner	Miguel Induráin (ESP)
	Second	Pello Ruiz Cabestany (ESP)
	Third	Jaime Vilamajó (ESP)

The 1986 Vuelta a Murcia was the second edition of the Vuelta a Murcia cycle race and was held on 25 February to 2 March 1986. The race started in Cartagena and finished in Murcia. The race was won by Miguel Induráin.

== General classification ==
Final general classification

Rank	Rider	Time
1	Miguel Induráin (ESP)	17h 32' 19"
2	Pello Ruiz Cabestany (ESP)	+ 6"
3	Jaime Vilamajó (ESP)	+ 7"
4	Dominique Lecrocq (FRA)	+ 10"
5	Celestino Prieto (ESP)	+ 11"
6	Carlos Hernández Bailo (ESP)	+ 13"
7	Marino Lejarreta (ESP)	+ 16"
8	Roberto Córdoba (ESP)	+ 22"
9	Vicente Belda (ESP)	+ 24"
10	Mariano Sánchez Martinez (ESP)	+ 25"
