= 1986 Clásica de San Sebastián =

Race details
- Dates: 13 August 1986
- Stages: 1
- Distance: 244 km (151.6 mi)
- Winning time: 5h 53' 53"

Results
	Winner	Iñaki Gastón (ESP)
	Second	Marino Lejarreta (ESP)
	Third	Juan Fernández Martín (ESP)

The 1986 Clásica de San Sebastián was the sixth edition of the Clásica de San Sebastián cycle race and was held on 13 August 1986. The race started and finished in San Sebastián. The race was won by Iñaki Gastón.

== General classification ==
Final general classification

Rank	Rider	Time
1	Iñaki Gastón (ESP)	5h 53' 53"
2	Marino Lejarreta (ESP)	+ 0"
3	Juan Fernández Martín (ESP)	+ 43"
4	Federico Echave (ESP)	+ 43"
5	Vicente Belda (ESP)	+ 4' 00"
6	Acácio da Silva (POR)	+ 4' 00"
7	Ludo Peeters (BEL)	+ 4' 00"
8	Carlos Hernández Bailo (ESP)	+ 4' 00"
9	Jokin Mújika (ESP)	+ 4' 00"
10	Anselmo Fuerte (ESP)	+ 4' 00"
