= Vuelta a los Valles Mineros =

Race details
- Date: June
- Region: Asturias, Spain
- English name: Tour of the Mining Valleys
- Discipline: Road race
- Type: Stage race

History
- First edition: 1965
- Editions: 32
- Final edition: 1997
- First winner: Joaquín Galera (ESP)
- Most wins: No repeat winners
- Final winner: José Manuel Uría (ESP)

The Vuelta a los Valles Mineros was a road bicycle race held annually in Asturias, Spain from 1965 until 1997.

In 2021, 24 years after its last professional edition in 1997, the race was revived as a cadet category competition.

== Winners ==
Year	Winner	Second	Third
1965	(Spain) Joaquín Galera	(Spain) Agustín Tamames	(Spain) Luis Ocaña
1966	(Spain) Mariano Díaz	(Spain) Manuel Martín Piñera	(Spain) Esteban Martín
1967	(Spain) Ginés García Perán	(Spain) Luis Pedro Santamarina	(Spain) Valentín Uriona
1968	(Spain) Eduardo Castelló	(Spain) Domingo Fernández	(Spain) Manuel Galera
1969	(Spain) Santiago Lazcano	(Spain) Vicente López Carril	(Spain) José Luis Abilleira
1970	(Spain) Ventura Díaz	(Spain) Miguel María Lasa	(Spain) José Manuel Fuente
1971	(Spain) Vicente López Carril	(Spain) Agustín Tamames	(Spain) Eduardo Castelló
1972	(Spain) Luis Pedro Santamarina	(Spain) Enrique Sahagún	(Spain) Andrés Oliva
1973	(Spain) Vicente López Carril	(Spain) Dámaso Torres	(Spain) José Luis Abilleira
1974	(Spain) José Grande	(Spain) José Casas	(Spain) Ventura Díaz
1975	(Portugal) José Martins	(Spain) Agustín Tamames	(Spain) Luis Ocaña
1976	(Spain) José Luis Uribezubia	(Spain) Luis Balagué	(Spain) José Casas
1977	(Spain) José Nazábal	(Portugal) Fernando Mendes	(Spain) Jorge Fortià
1978	(Spain) José Nazábal	(Spain) Alberto Fernández Blanco	(Spain) José Enrique Cima
1979	(Spain) Ángel Arroyo	(Spain) Sebastián Pozo	(Spain) Julián Andiano
1980	(Spain) Alberto Fernández Blanco	(Spain) José Luis Laguía	(Spain) Antonio Gonzales
1981	(Spain) Alberto Fernández Blanco	(Spain) Jorge Fortià	(Spain) Antonio Coll
1982	(Spain) Luis Vicente Otin	(Spain) Ismael Lejarreta	(Spain) Ángel Arroyo
1983	(Spain) Felipe Yáñez	(Spain) Ángel Arroyo	(West Germany) Reimund Dietzen
1984	(Spain) Julián Gorospe	(Spain) Iñaki Gastón	(Spain) Jesús Blanco Villar
1985	(Spain) José Ángel Sarrapio	(Spain) Francisco Caro	(West Germany) Peter Hilse
1986	(Belgium) Lucien Van Impe	(Spain) Juan Tomás Martínez	(Spain) Felipe Yáñez
1987	(Spain) Miguel Indurain	(Spain) Roberto Torres	(Spain) Roque de la Cruz
1988	(Spain) Federico Echave	(Portugal) Manuel Cunha	(Spain) Roque de la Cruz
1989	(Spain) Laudelino Cubino	(Spain) Javier Murguialday	(Spain) Federico Echave
1990	(Spain) Jesús Montoya	(Spain) Federico Echave	(Switzerland) Fabian Fuchs
1991	(Netherlands) Gert-Jan Theunisse	(France) Ronan Pensec	(Spain) Federico Echave
1992	(Colombia) Alberto Camargo	(Colombia) William Palacio	(Portugal) Acácio da Silva
1993	(Colombia) Fabio Hernán Rodríguez	(United Kingdom) Robert Millar	(Denmark) Bo Hamburger
1994	(Italy) Massimo Ghirotto	(Italy) Francesco Casagrande	(Italy) Michele Bartoli
1995	(Spain) Fernando Escartín	(Spain) Federico Echave	(Spain) Miguel Indurain
1996	No race		
1997	(Spain) José Manuel Uría	(Spain) David Cañada	(Spain) Marino Alonso
