= 1979 Tour of the Basque Country =

Race details
- Dates: 2–6 April 1979
- Stages: 5
- Distance: 826.5 km (513.6 mi)
- Winning time: 23h 53' 08"

Results
| | Winner | Giovanni Battaglin (ITA) |
| | Second | Vicente Belda (ESP) |
| | Third | Miguel María Lasa (ESP) |

The 1979 Tour of the Basque Country was the 19th edition of the Tour of the Basque Country cycle race and was held from 2 April to 6 April 1979. The race started in Tolosa and finished in Arantzazu. The race was won by Giovanni Battaglin.

== General classification ==
Final general classification

| Rank | Rider | Time |
|---|---|---|
| 1 | Giovanni Battaglin (ITA) | 23h 53' 08" |
| 2 | Vicente Belda (ESP) | + 2' 09" |
| 3 | Miguel María Lasa (ESP) | + 2' 26" |
| 4 | Manuel Esparza (ESP) | + 2' 26" |
| 5 | José Pesarrodona (ESP) | + 2' 48" |
| 6 | Enrique Cima (ESP) | + 2' 51" |
| 7 | Felipe Yáñez (ESP) | + 2' 55" |
| 8 | Julián Andiano (ESP) | + 3' 00" |
| 9 | Alberto Fernández (ESP) | + 3' 00" |
| 10 | José Luis Mayoz (ESP) | + 3' 14" |
