= Francisco Javier Cedena =

Spanish cyclist

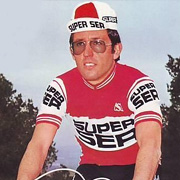
- Francisco Javier Cedena

Personal information
- Full name: Francisco Javier Martínez Cedena
- Born: 13 March 1954 (age 72) Madrid, Spain

Cycling career
- Sport: Cycling
- Discipline: Road
- Role: Rider

Professional teams
- 1977: Eldina
- 1978-1980: Teka
- 1981: CR–Colchon
- 1982: Zor–Helios
- 1983: Hueso Chocolates

Major wins
- Grand Tours Vuelta a España Points classification (1981) 1 individual stage (1981)

Francisco Javier Martínez Cedena (born 13 March 1954 in Madrid) is a former Spanish cyclist.

== Palmarès ==
1972
1st Junior National Road Race Champion
1975
1st stages 2 and 5 Cinturón a Mallorca
1976
1st stage 4 Cinturón a Mallorca
1979
1st Trofeo Elola
3rd Vuelta a Aragón

1st stage 3

1980
1st stage 2 Vuelta a La Rioja
1981
Vuelta a España
1st Points classification

1st stage 19

1st stage 5 Vuelta a Cantabria
1982
1st stage 6b Vuelta a Asturias
1983
1st Vuelta a Murcia
