= 1981 Vuelta a España =

Race details
- Dates: 21 April – 10 May
- Stages: 19
- Distance: 3,446 km (2,141 mi)
- Winning time: 98h 04' 49"

Results
Jersey awarded to the overall winner	Winner	Giovanni Battaglin (ITA)	(Inoxpran)
	Second	Pedro Muñoz Machín Rodríguez (ESP)	(Zor–Helios)
	Third	Vicente Belda (ESP)	(Kelme–Gios)
Jersey awarded to the points classification winner	Points	Francisco Javier Cedena (ESP)	(Colchon C.R.)
Jersey awarded to the mountains classification winner	Mountains	José Luis Laguía (ESP)	(Reynolds)
Jersey awarded to the sprints classification winner	Sprints	Hugues Grondin (FRA)	(Manzaneque)
	Team	Zor	

The 36th Edition Vuelta a España (Tour of Spain), a long-distance bicycle stage race and one of the three grand tours, was held from 21 April to 10 May 1981. It consisted of 19 stages covering a total of 3,446 km (2,141 mi), and was won by Giovanni Battaglin of the Inoxpran cycling team.

Regis Clere won the prologue of the race and kept the leader's jersey until the mountain time trial where on the very long climb to Sierra Nevada, Giovanni Battaglin won the stage and took over the leader's jersey. The only threat to Battaglin's lead was Pedro Muñoz. The entire Teka team withdrew from the race withdrawing potential favourites Marino Lejarreta and Alberto Fernández. Battaglin and his Inoxpran team withstood the challenge from the Spanish and brought Battaglin to his first grand tour victory. Three days later after Battaglin's triumph in Spain, he began the 1981 Giro d'Italia which he would win becoming the second rider after Eddy Merckx to win the Vuelta-Giro double.

== Route ==
List of stages
Stage	Date	Course	Distance	Type	Winner
P	21 April	Santander to Santander	6.3 km (4 mi)	Individual time trial	Régis Clère (FRA)
1	22 April	Santander to Avilés	221 km (137 mi)		Guido Bontempi (ITA)
2	23 April	Avilés to León	159 km (99 mi)		Alfredo Chinetti (ITA)
3	24 April	León to Salamanca	195 km (121 mi)		Guido Bontempi (ITA)
4	25 April	Salamanca to Cáceres	206 km (128 mi)		Celestino Prieto (ESP)
5	26 April	Cáceres to Mérida	152 km (94 mi)		Heddie Nieuwdorp (NED)
6	27 April	Mérida to Seville	199 km (124 mi)		Jos Lammertink (NED)
7	28 April	Écija to Jaén	181 km (112 mi)		Juan Fernández (ESP)
8a	29 April	Jaén to Granada	100 km (62 mi)		José María Yurrebaso (ESP)
8b	29 April	Granada to Sierra Nevada	30.5 km (19 mi)	Individual time trial	Giovanni Battaglin (ITA)
9	30 April	Baza to Murcia	204 km (127 mi)		Imanol Murga (ESP)
10	1 May	Murcia to Almussafes	223 km (139 mi)		Kim Andersen (DEN)
11	2 May	Almussafes to Peñíscola	193 km (120 mi)		Jesús Suárez Cueva (ESP)
12	3 May	Peñíscola to Esparreguera	217 km (135 mi)		Frédéric Vichot (FRA)
13	4 May	Esparreguera to Rasos de Peguera	187 km (116 mi)		Vicente Belda (ESP)
14	5 May	Gironella to Balaguer	197 km (122 mi)		José Luis López Cerrón (ESP)
15a	6 May	Balaguer to Alfajarín	146 km (91 mi)		Pedro Muñoz Machín (ESP)
15b	6 May	Zaragoza to Zaragoza	11.3 km (7 mi)	Individual time trial	Régis Clère (FRA)
16	7 May	Calatayud to Torrejón de Ardoz	209 km (130 mi)		Álvaro Pino (ESP)
17	8 May	Torrejón de Ardoz to Segovia	150 km (93 mi)		Miguel María Lasa (ESP)
18	9 May	Segovia to Los Ángeles de San Rafael	175 km (109 mi)		Ángel Arroyo (ESP)
19	10 May	Madrid to Madrid	84 km (52 mi)		Francisco Javier Cedena (ESP)
	Total		3,446 km (2,141 mi)		

== Final standings ==
=== General classification ===
Final general classification (1–10)
Rank	Rider	Team	Time
1	Giovanni Battaglin (ITA)	Inoxpran	98h 04' 49"
2	Pedro Muñoz Machín Rodríguez (ESP)	Zor–Helios	+ 2' 09"
3	Vicente Belda (ESP)	Kelme–Gios	+ 2' 29"
4	Jørgen Marcussen (DEN)	Inoxpran	+ 3' 33"
5	Antonio Coll (ESP)	Colchon C.R.	+ 4' 26"
6	Ángel Arroyo (ESP)	Zor–Helios	+ 4' 30"
7	José Luis Laguía (ESP)	Reynolds–Galli	+ 6' 05"
8	Faustino Rupérez (ESP)	Zor–Helios	+ 7' 09"
9	Régis Clère (FRA)	Miko–Mercier	+ 7' 23"
10	Miguel María Lasa (ESP)	Zor–Helios	+ 10' 54"

Final general classification (11–25)
11	Eduardo Chozas (ESP)	Zor–Helios	+ 12' 48"
12	Luciano Loro (ITA)	Inoxpran	+ 13' 49"
13	José Antonio Cabrero (ESP)	Zor–Helios	+ 16' 17"
14	Alfonso Dal Pian (ITA)	Inoxpran	+ 17' 17"
15	Peter Zijerveld (NED)	HB Alarmsystemen	+ 19' 55"
16	Angel De Las Heras (ESP)	Hueso-Manzaneque	+ 22' 32"
17	Enrique Martínez Heredia (ESP)	Colchon C.R.	+ 26' 16"
18	Juan Pujol Pages (ESP)	Colchon C.R.	+ 27' 36"
19	Francisco Javier Cedena (ESP)	Colchon C.R.	+ 29' 46"
20	Guillermo De La Pena (ESP)	Zor–Helios	+ 30' 36"
21	Frédéric Vichot (FRA)	Miko–Mercier	+ 31' 54"
22	Álvaro Pino (ESP)	Colchon C.R.	+ 33' 24"
23	José Luis López Cerrón (ESP)	Zor–Helios	+ 36' 30"
24	Amilcare Sgalbazzi (ITA)	Inoxpran	+ 37' 49"
25	Anastasio Greciano (ESP)	Reynolds–Galli	+ 44' 44"

=== Team classification ===
Final team classification
Rank	Team	Time
1	Zor Helios	294h 09' 15"
2	Inoxpran	+ 17' 14"
3	Colchon CR	+ 43' 04"
4	Kelme	+ 1h 05' 01"
5	Miko Mercier	+ 1h 19' 31"
6	Reynolds	+ 1h 48' 41"
7	H.B.	+ 2h 06' 31"
8	Manzaneque	+ 2h 30' 41"

=== Points classification ===
Final points classification
Rank	Rider	Team	Points
1	Francisco Javier Cedena (ESP)	Colchon	211
2	Jesús Suárez Cueva (ESP)	Kelme	137
3	Miguel María Lasa (ESP)	Zor	134

=== Mountains classification ===
Final mountains classification
Rank	Rider	Team	Points
1	José Luis Laguía (ESP)	Reynolds	144
2	Vicente Belda (ESP)	Kelme	98
3	José Luis López Cerrón (ESP)	Zor	69
4	Giovanni Battaglin (ITA)	Inoxpran	60
5	Pedro Muñoz Machín Rodríguez (ESP)	Zor	57

=== Sprints classification ===
Final sprints classification
Rank	Rider	Team	Points
1	Hugues Grondin (FRA)	Manzaneque	21
2	Miguel Acha (ESP)	Reynolds	12
3	Jesús Suárez Cueva (ESP)	Kelme	10
