= Clásica a los Puertos de Guadarrama =

- Cyclists during 2005 Clásica a los Puertos de Guadarrama

Race details
- Date: Late-August
- Region: Madrid, Spain
- English name: Guadarrama climbs classic
- Local name(s): Clásica a los Puertos de Guadarrama (in Spanish)
- Discipline: Road
- Competition: UCI Europe Tour
- Type: Single-day
- Organiser: Peña Ciclista Clásica a los Puertos

History
- First edition: 1978
- Editions: 31 (as of 2008)
- First winner: (Spain) Carlos Machín
- Most wins: (Spain) Laudelino Cubino (Spain) Fernando Escartín (2 wins)
- Most recent: (United States) Levi Leipheimer

Clásica a los Puertos de Guadarrama is a professional cycle road race held in the Sierra de Guadarrama, Spain in late August each year. The event was first run in 1978 and since 2005 it has been organised as a 1.1 event on the UCI Europe Tour.

== Winners ==
Year	Country	Rider	Team
1978	Spain	Carlos Machín	
1979	Spain	Ginés García	
1980	Spain	Ángel Arroyo	
1981	Spain	Luis Gutiérrez	
1982	Spain	Vicente Belda	
1983	Spain	José Luis Laguía	
1984	Spain	Iñaki Gastón	
1985	Spain	Juan Fernández	
1986	Spain	Laudelino Cubino	
1987	Spain	Roberto Córdoba	
1988	Spain	Laudelino Cubino	
1989	Spain	Jokin Mújika	
1990	Australia	Stephen Hodge	
1991	Spain	Pedro Delgado	
1992	Colombia	Néstor Mora	
1993	Spain	Miguel Induráin	
1994	Spain	Fernando Escartín	
1995	Spain	Ángel Casero	
1996	Spain	Fernando Escartín	
1997	Spain	Manuel Beltrán	
1998	Spain	Marcos Serrano	
1999	Spain	Miguel Ángel Martín Perdiguero	
2000	Spain	Francisco Mancebo	
2001	Colombia	Santiago Botero	
2002	Spain	Josep Jufré	
2003	Russia	Denis Menchov	
2004	Spain	Jorge Ferrío	
2005	Spain	Xabier Zandio	
2006	Spain	Rubén Plaza	
2007	Spain	Héctor Guerra	
2008	United States	Levi Leipheimer	
