= Antonio Coll =

Spanish cyclist (born 1959)

Personal information
- Born: 6 April 1959 (age 67) Sabadell, Spain

Cycling career
- Sport: Cycling
- Discipline: Road
- Role: Rider

Professional teams
- 1980–1981: Colchón CR
- 1982–1986: Teka
- 1987–1990: Kelme–Ibexpress

Major wins
- Grand Tours Vuelta a España 1 individual stage (1982)

Antonio Coll (born 6 April 1959) is a Spanish former professional racing cyclist. He rode in three editions of the Tour de France and seven editions of the Vuelta a España.

== Major results ==
1980
2nd Overall Escalada a Montjuïc
5th Overall Volta a Catalunya
1981
1st Overall Vuelta a Aragón
1st Stage 3b Vuelta a los Valles Mineros
3rd Overall Volta a la Comunitat Valenciana

1st Stage 4a

5th Overall Vuelta a España
7th Overall Vuelta a Andalucía
1982
1st Stage 4 Vuelta a España
1st Stage 2 Tour of the Basque Country
2nd Overall Vuelta a Cantabria

1st Stage 2

2nd Trofeo Masferrer
6th Road race, National Road Championships
6th Clásica de San Sebastián
1983
Vuelta a Cantabria

1st Stages 4 & 6

1st Stage 7a Volta a Catalunya
1st Prologue Volta a la Comunitat Valenciana
1st Stage 4 Vuelta a Asturias
2nd Overall Vuelta a Andalucía
2nd Clásica de San Sebastián
2nd Clásica a los Puertos de Guadarrama
3rd Road race, National Road Championships
3rd Subida a Arrate
4th Overall Setmana Catalana de Ciclisme
1984
3rd Prueba Villafranca de Ordizia
8th Overall Volta a Catalunya
10th Trofeo Masferrer
1985
3rd Clásica a los Puertos de Guadarrama
6th Overall Setmana Catalana de Ciclisme
6th Subida al Naranco
10th Clásica de San Sebastián
1987
5th Overall Vuelta a Murcia
