= Margnat =

French wines

Margnat wines were everyday wines widely distributed in France during the post-war period.

The Margnat company was founded in the 1890s by Edouard Margnat. In 1940 his three sons took over the business widely known in the industry as "Margnat Brothers". The company notoriety kept growing and in the 1970s it became one of the leading wine dealers in France. In 1967 Margnat SA changed its name to "Société des vins de France" or SVF. In 1974 the 3 Brothers sold their equity and retired from the wine business. Subsequently, SVF was acquired by Pernod Ricard then the Castel Group.

== Wine merchants: a family tradition ==
The trade of wine merchant in the Margnat family dates back to the French Revolution when Francois Margnat opened his first warehouse in the Auvergne followed by Lyons.

== The Margnat family: wine merchants 1900-1980 ==
=== From 1900 to 1940 ===
Edouard Margnat incorporated "Margnat Wines" and created portside docks in Marseille at 5 Quai de la Tourette next to the Marseille Cathedral known as "La Major". He took advantage of Marseille proximity to Algeria and using family connections (the Bories family in Mostaganem Algeria) became one of the leading wine merchant of the time.

=== From 1940 to 1980 ===
The Margnat Brothers, Paul, Robert and Jacques succeed their father in the 1940s in the "Margnat Frères company". They get to be known in the wine trade as "Brothers Margnat". From the 1950s through the 1970s they are among the main wine traders in France. Supported by multi media advertising (outdoors, in store, roadside and delivery trucks) Margnat wines became a familiar sight in French towns and the countryside.

== Company expansion and the SVF ==
Concentration in the French wine industry started in 1965 through mergers to create national companies.

In Marseille the Sapvin cy owner of the "Kiravi" brand acquired SVF in 1965 and took the better known name of "Société des vins de France" SVF. Sapvin was then the closest to Margnat Brothers among French traders. At the same time Margnat Brothers co split in two: Margnat Brothers finance and Margnat SA (Margnat wine brands).

In 1967 Margnat SA acquired Société des vins de France (formerly Sapvin) followed in 1968 by the "Grands vins sélectionnés Co" (selected great wines co) owner of the Geveor brand which was a well known major Parisian company at the time. As Sapvin had done previously, Margnat SA kept the SVF name and became "Société des vins de France". In 1971 SVF acquired DMS cy (distribution of selected brands) and its subsidiary DML (local markets development). With its Prefontaines and Postillon brands the merged company became the largest wine distributor in Paris.

By 1971 SVF had become the largest wine company in France. It was no longer a family owned business and the brothers Margnat sold their minority stake and retired from the wine industry. SVF kept going then became a subsidiary of the Pernod Ricard Group. A few years later it was sold to the Castel Group.
