= Escalada a Montjuïc =

Defunct cycling race

Race details
- Date: Mid-October
- Region: Barcelona, Catalonia, Spain
- English name: The Scaling of Montjuïc
- Local name(s): L'Escalada a Montjuïc (in Catalan); La Escalada a Montjuïc (in Spanish)
- Discipline: Road race
- Competition: UCI Europe Tour
- Type: One-day, two-stage race
- Organiser: Esport Ciclista Barcelona

History
- First edition: 1965
- Editions: 44
- Final edition: 2007
- First winner: Federico Bahamontes (ESP)
- Most wins: Eddy Merckx (BEL) (6 wins)
- Final winner: Daniel Moreno (ESP)

The Escalada a Montjuïc (in Catalan, English: Scaling of Montjuïc, Spanish: Escalada a Montjuïc) was a one-day, two-stage road bicycle racing race held in Barcelona, Catalonia, Spain since 1965. It was held in the middle of October, as one of the final races in the European season. Since 2005, it was organised as a 1.2 category race as a part of the UCI Europe Tour. The event, organised by Esport Ciclista Barcelona, played host to number of races for women, veterans, young riders and elite men.

The elite men's race was split into two stages. The first stage was a criterium consisting of five laps around a five kilometre circuit. The second stage was an individual time trial up the slopes of Montjuïc, which is usually around ten kilometres. The elite men's race mainly attracted professional Spanish riders. Eddy Merckx holds the record for most wins with six victories between 1966 and 1975.

== Winners ==
Year	Country	Rider	Team
1965 Mar	Spain	Federico Bahamontes	Margnat
1965 Oct	France	Raymond Poulidor	Mercier–BP–Hutchinson
1966	Belgium	Eddy Merckx	Peugeot–BP
1967	France	Raymond Poulidor	Mercier–BP–Hutchinson
1968	France	Raymond Poulidor	Mercier–BP–Hutchinson
1969	Italy	Gianni Motta	Sanson
1970	Belgium	Eddy Merckx	Faemino–Faema
1971	Belgium	Eddy Merckx	Molteni
1972	Belgium	Eddy Merckx	Molteni
1973	Spain	Jesús Manzaneque	La Casera
1974	Belgium	Eddy Merckx	Molteni
1975	Belgium	Eddy Merckx	Molteni
1976	Belgium	Michel Pollentier	Flandria
1977	France	Bernard Thévenet	Peugeot
1978	Belgium	Michel Pollentier	Flandria
1979	Belgium	Claude Criquielion	Kas
1980	Spain	Marino Lejarreta	Teka
1981	Netherlands	Joop Zoetemelk	TI–Raleigh–Creda
1982	Spain	Marino Lejarreta	Teka
1983	Spain	Marino Lejarreta	Alfa Lum
1984	Belgium	Claude Criquielion	Splendor
1985	Spain	Vicente Belda	Kelme–Merckx
1986	Spain	Vicente Belda	Kelme–Merckx
1987	Spain	Álvaro Pino	BH
1988	Spain	Marino Lejarreta	Caja Rural–Orbea
1989	Netherlands	Erik Breukink	Panasonic–Isostar–Colnago–Agu
1990	Spain	Marino Lejarreta	ONCE
1991	Colombia	Oliverio Rincón	Kelme–Ibexpress
1992	Switzerland	Alex Zülle	ONCE
1993	Italy	Maurizio Fondriest	Lampre–Polti
1994	Switzerland	Tony Rominger	Mapei–CLAS
1995	Italy	Claudio Chiappucci	Carrera Jeans–Tassoni
1996	Switzerland	Fabian Jeker	Festina–Lotus
1997	France	Laurent Jalabert	ONCE
1998	Switzerland	Fabian Jeker	Festina–Lotus
1999	Russia	Andrei Zintchenko	Vitalicio Seguros
2000	Switzerland	Fabian Jeker	Festina
2001	Spain	Joaquim Rodríguez	ONCE–Eroski
2002	Spain	Joseba Beloki	ONCE–Eroski
2003	Spain	Iván Gutiérrez	iBanesto.com
2004	Spain	Samuel Sánchez	Euskaltel–Euskadi
2005	Spain	Samuel Sánchez	Euskaltel–Euskadi
2006	Spain	Igor Antón	Euskaltel–Euskadi
2007	Spain	Daniel Moreno	Relax–GAM
