= Faustino Rupérez =

Spanish cyclist (born 1956)

Personal information
- Full name: Faustino Rupérez Rincón
- Born: 29 July 1956 (age 70) Piquera de San Esteban, Soria, Spain

Cycling career
- Sport: Cycling
- Current team: Retired
- Discipline: Road
- Role: Rider

Professional team
- 1979–1985: Moliner–Vereco

Managerial teams
- 1986–1988: Kas
- 1989: Fagor–MBK
- 1990–1992: Puertas Mavisa

Major wins
- Grand Tours Vuelta a España General classification (1980) 2 individual stages (1980) Stage races Volta a Catalunya (1981) Vuelta a Burgos (1981)

Faustino Rupérez Rincón (born 29 July 1956) is a Spanish former professional road racing cyclist who raced between 1979 and 1985. Ruperez is most famous for capturing the overall title at the 1980 Vuelta a España.

He finished 4th in the 1979 Vuelta a España, won the 1981 Volta a Catalunya and finished 2nd overall at the 1984 Tour of the Basque Country behind Sean Kelly.

Since retiring from competitive cycling, Rupérez has served as a directeur sportif for the Spain national team.

== Career achievements ==
=== Major results ===
1977
1st Overall Cinturón a Mallorca

1st Stages 2 & 4

1st Overall Volta a Lleida
1978
6th Overall Tour de l'Avenir
1979
1st Road race, National Road Championships
1st Prueba Villafranca de Ordizia
1st Stage 5b Vuelta a Aragón
1st Stage 5 Costa del Azahar
2nd Overall Setmana Catalana de Ciclisme
3rd GP Navarra
4th Overall Vuelta a España
1980
1st Overall Vuelta a España

1st Stages 5 & 7

1st Overall Vuelta a Asturias

1st Stage 2

4th Overall Tour of the Basque Country
4th Overall Volta a Catalunya
5th Overall Vuelta a Andalucía
1981
1st Overall Volta a Catalunya
1st Overall Vuelta a Burgos

1st Stage 2

1st Overall Six Days of Madrid (with Donald Allan)
1st Stage 3 Vuelta a Cantabria
3rd Clásica de San Sebastián
4th Subida al Naranco
4th Trofeo Masferrer
8th Overall Vuelta a España
1982
1st Giro del Piemonte
1st GP Villafranca de Ordizia
1st GP Pascuas
1st Stage 4a Vuelta a Burgos
2nd Overall Vuelta a Asturias

1st Stage 5

2nd Overall Volta a la Comunitat Valenciana
2nd Subida a Arrate
4th Overall Vuelta a España
4th Overall Vuelta a Andalucía
4th Subida al Naranco
6th Overall Volta a Catalunya
9th Clásica de San Sebastián
10th Overall Giro d'Italia
10th Overall Tour of the Basque Country
1983
2nd Overall Volta a Catalunya
2nd Overall Setmana Catalana de Ciclisme
2nd Clásica de Sabiñánigo
2nd Subida a Arrate
3rd Overall Vuelta a Asturias

1st Stage 2

4th Road race, UCI Road World Championships
5th Clásica de San Sebastián
7th Overall Giro d'Italia
7th Overall Tour of the Basque Country
10th Overall Vuelta a España
1984
1st Overall Vuelta a Asturias
1st Stage 4 Vuelta a La Rioja
2nd Overall Tour of the Basque Country
2nd Overall Vuelta a Burgos
7th Overall Setmana Catalana de Ciclisme
10th Clásica de San Sebastián
1985
1st Memorial Alberto Fernandez
2nd Trofeo Luis Puig
10th Clásica de San Sebastián

=== Grand Tour general classification results timeline ===
| Grand Tour | 1979 | 1980 | 1981 | 1982 | 1983 | 1984 | 1985 |
|---|---|---|---|---|---|---|---|
| Giro d'Italia | — | 11 | DNF | 10 | 7 | 13 | — |
| Tour de France | — | — | — | — | — | — | 39 |
| Vuelta a España | 4 | 1 | 8 | 4 | 10 | 21 | 19 |
