= Carlos Hernández Bailo =

Spanish cyclist (born 1958)

Personal information
- Born: 27 December 1958 (age 67) Barcelona, Spain

Cycling career
- Sport: Cycling
- Current team: Retired
- Discipline: Road
- Role: Rider

Professional teams
- 1981–1986: Reynolds
- 1987–1988: Teka
- 1989–1992: Lotus–Zahor
- 1993: Diamond Back Racing

Major wins
- Grand Tours Vuelta a España Mountains classification (1992) 3 individual stages (1983, 1987, 1990) One-day races and Classics National Road Race Championships (1983, 1989)

Carlos Hernández Bailo (born 27 December 1958) is a Spanish former professional racing cyclist. He rode in seven editions of the Tour de France and ten editions of the Vuelta a España.

== Major results ==
1981
1st Stage 4 Vuelta a Cantabria
1982
1st Overall Vuelta a Aragón
10th Trofeo Masferrer
1983
1st Road race, National Road Championships
1st Circuito de Getxo
1st Stage 14 Vuelta a España
6th Clásica de San Sebastián
1985
2nd Overall Vuelta a Aragón

1st Stage 5

1986
3rd Subida al Naranco
2nd Overall Vuelta a Castilla y León
6th Overall Vuelta a Murcia
8th Overall Volta a Catalunya
8th Clásica de San Sebastián
9th Trofeo Masferrer
1987
1st Stage 12 Vuelta a España
1st Stage 4 Vuelta a Asturias
2nd Overall Vuelta a Murcia

1st Stage 1a

1988
1st Overall Vuelta a Murcia

1st Stage 5b

4th Subida al Naranco
1989
1st Road race, National Road Championships
1st Stage 1 Vuelta a Castilla y León
3rd Overall Vuelta a Aragón
5th Overall Vuelta a Murcia
6th Overall Vuelta Asturias
8th Overall Vuelta a La Rioja
9th Overall Euskal Bizikleta
1990
1st Stage 11 Vuelta a España
1992
1st Mountains classification, Vuelta a España
3rd Road race, National Road Championships
9th Clásica de Almería

=== Grand Tour general classification results timeline ===
Grand Tour	1981	1982	1983	1984	1985	1986	1987	1988	1989	1990	1991	1992
Giro d'Italia	—	—	—	—	—	—	—	—	—	—	—	—
Tour de France	—	—	55	53	76	53	128	DNF	—	—	—	85
Vuelta a España	DNF	73	28	—	36	51	23	27	—	31	110	22
