= Per Bausager =

Danish cyclist

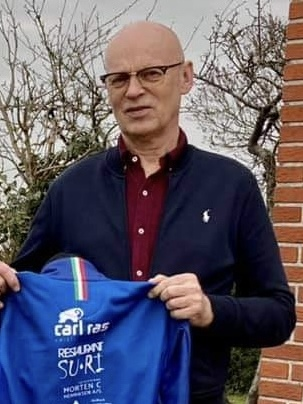

Personal information
- Born: 6 September 1956 (age 70)

Cycling career
- Sport: Cycling
- Role: Rider

Per Bausager (born 6 September 1956) is a Danish former racing cyclist. He rode in the 1979 Tour de France.
