= José Luis Laguía =

Spanish cyclist (born 1959)

Personal information
- Full name: José Luis Laguía Martínez
- Born: 30 September 1959 (age 67) Pedro Muñoz, Spain

Cycling career
- Sport: Cycling
- Discipline: Road
- Role: Rider
- Rider type: Climbing specialist

Professional teams
- 1980–1986: Reynolds
- 1987: PDM–Ultima–Concorde
- 1988–1989: Reynolds
- 1990: Lotus–Festina
- 1991: Paternina
- 1991–1992: Artiach–Royal

Managerial teams
- 2000–2003: Kelme–Costa Blanca
- 2012: Movistar Team
- 2012: Movistar Continental Team
- 2015–2017: Movistar Team

Major wins
- Grand Tours Vuelta a España Mountains classification (1981, 1982, 1983, 1985, 1986) 4 individual stages (1982, 1983)

José Luis Laguía Martínez (born 30 September 1959) is a retired Spanish road cyclist and climber. He won a record five mountains classifications at the Vuelta a España during his career. As a faithful Domestique of Pedro Delgado he followed his leader to PDM–Ultima–Concorde when he left Reynolds.

== Major results ==
1980
2nd Overall Vuelta a los Valles Mineros

1st Stage 3b (ITT)

2nd Klasika Primavera
2nd Clásica de Sabiñánigo
5th Overall Tour of the Basque Country
8th Overall Volta a la Comunitat Valenciana
1981
1st Stage 3 Vuelta a Asturias
4th Overall Tour of the Basque Country
4th Overall Vuelta a Burgos
5th Road race, National Road Championships
7th Overall Vuelta a España

1st Mountains classification

7th Overall Setmana Catalana de Ciclisme
8th Overall Volta a la Comunitat Valenciana
1982
1st Road race, National Road Championships
1st Overall Tour of the Basque Country
1st Overall Vuelta a Burgos
Volta a Catalunya

1st Stages 1 & 2b

1st Stage 2 Costa del Azahar
5th Overall Vuelta a España

1st Mountains classification
1st Stages 6, 9 & 11

5th Overall Setmana Catalana de Ciclisme
5th Klasika Primavera
1983
1st Overall Vuelta a Cantabria

1st Stage 1

1st Clásica a los Puertos de Guadarrama
Vuelta a España

1st Mountains classification
1st Stage 16

Vuelta a Burgos

1st Mountains classification
1st Stage 5

1st Stage 2 Vuelta a Aragón
2nd GP Navarra
4th Road race, National Road Championships
4th Klasika Primavera
6th Overall Setmana Catalana de Ciclisme
8th Overall Volta a Catalunya
1984
1st Stage 2 Grand Prix du Midi Libre
1st Stage 5a Vuelta a los Valles Mineros
2nd Overall Escalada a Montjuïc

1st Stage 1b (ITT)

5th Trofeo Masferrer
8th Overall Setmana Catalana de Ciclisme
1985
1st Mountains classification Vuelta a España
2nd Clásica de Sabiñánigo
3rd Gran Premio de Llodio
5th Subida a Arrate
6th Trofeo Masferrer
7th Overall Tour of the Basque Country

1st Stage 1

1986
1st Overall Vuelta Ciclista a la Rioja
1st Mountains classification Vuelta a España
3rd Trofeo Masferrer
7th Overall Grand Prix du Midi Libre
9th Klasika Primavera
1987
6th Overall Tour of the Basque Country
1988
1st Stage 1 Vuelta a Castilla y León
1989
9th Overall Tour of the Basque Country
10th Trofeo Masferrer
1990
8th Overall Vuelta a Aragón
1991
4th Overall Tour of the Basque Country
5th Klasika Primavera
6th Overall Euskal Bizikleta

=== Grand Tour general classification results timeline ===
Grand Tour	1980	1981	1982	1983	1984	1985	1986	1987	1988	1989	1990	1991	1992
Vuelta a España	21	7	5	24	19	27	25	29	17	44	23	DNF	DNF
Giro d'Italia	—	—	—	—	—	—	—	—	30	—	—	—	—
Tour de France	—	—	—	DNF	41	DNF	121	43	—	—	—	—	—

Legend
—	Did not compete
DNF	Did not finish
