= Giovanni Battaglin =

Italian cyclist (born 1951)

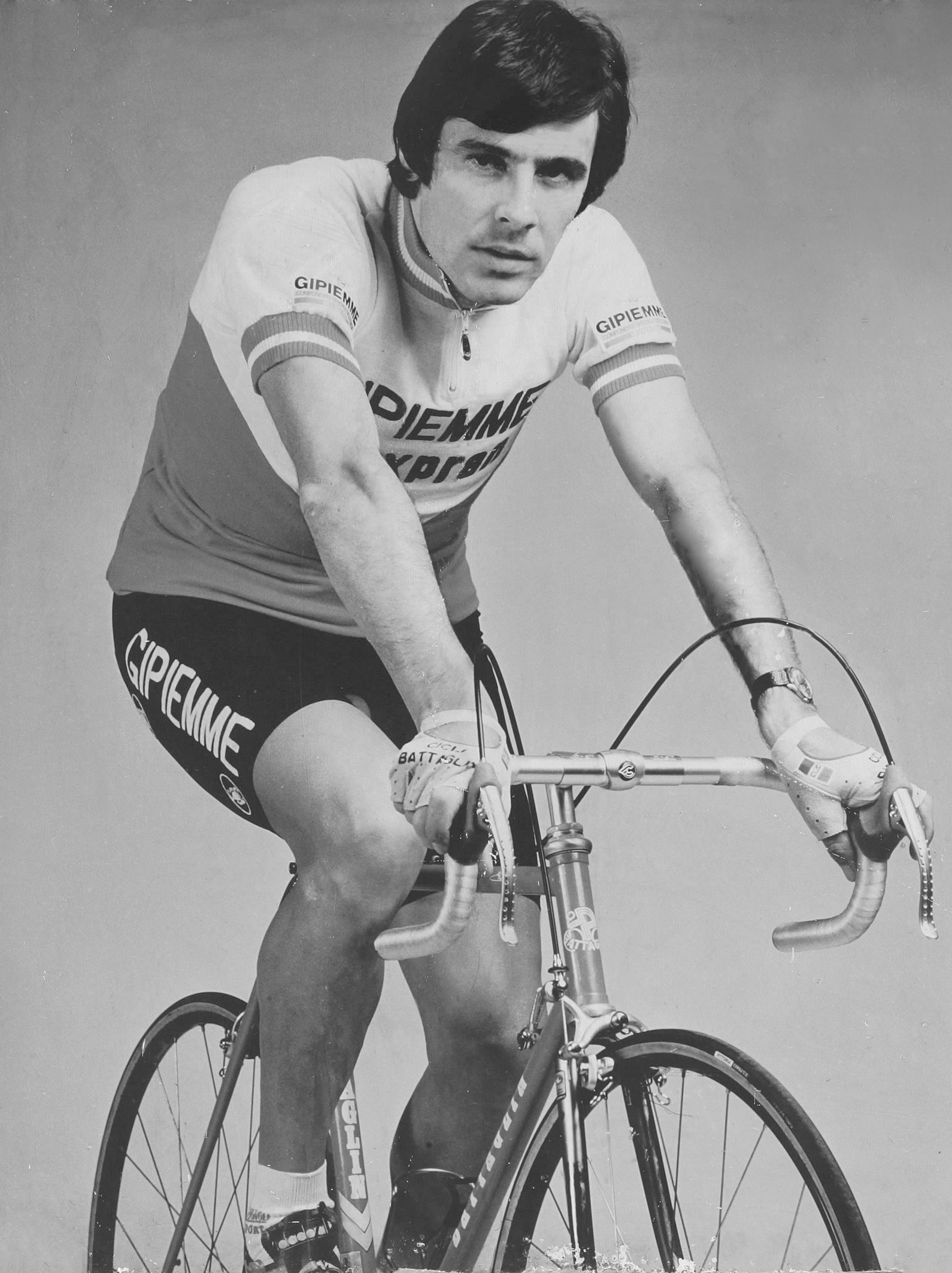
- Battaglin in 1982

Personal information
- Born: 22 July 1951 (age 75) Marostica, Italy

Cycling career
- Sport: Cycling
- Discipline: Road
- Role: Rider

Professional teams
- 1973–1977: Jollj Ceramica
- 1978: Fiorella–Mocassini–Citroën
- 1979–1984: Inoxpran

Major wins
- Grand Tours Tour de France Mountains classification (1979) 1 individual stage (1976) Giro d'Italia General classification (1981) 4 individual stages (1975, 1980, 1981) Vuelta a España General classification (1981) 1 individual stage (1981) Stage Races Tour of the Basque Country (1979)

Giovanni Battaglin (born 22 July 1951) is an Italian professional road racing cyclist. The highlight of his career was his overall win in the 1981 Giro d'Italia and the 1981 Vuelta a España.

== Early years ==
Battaglin was born in Marostica, province of Vicenza. Battaglin won the 1972 Amateur Giro d'Italia and turned professional the following year with the Jollj Ceramica team.

== Professional career ==
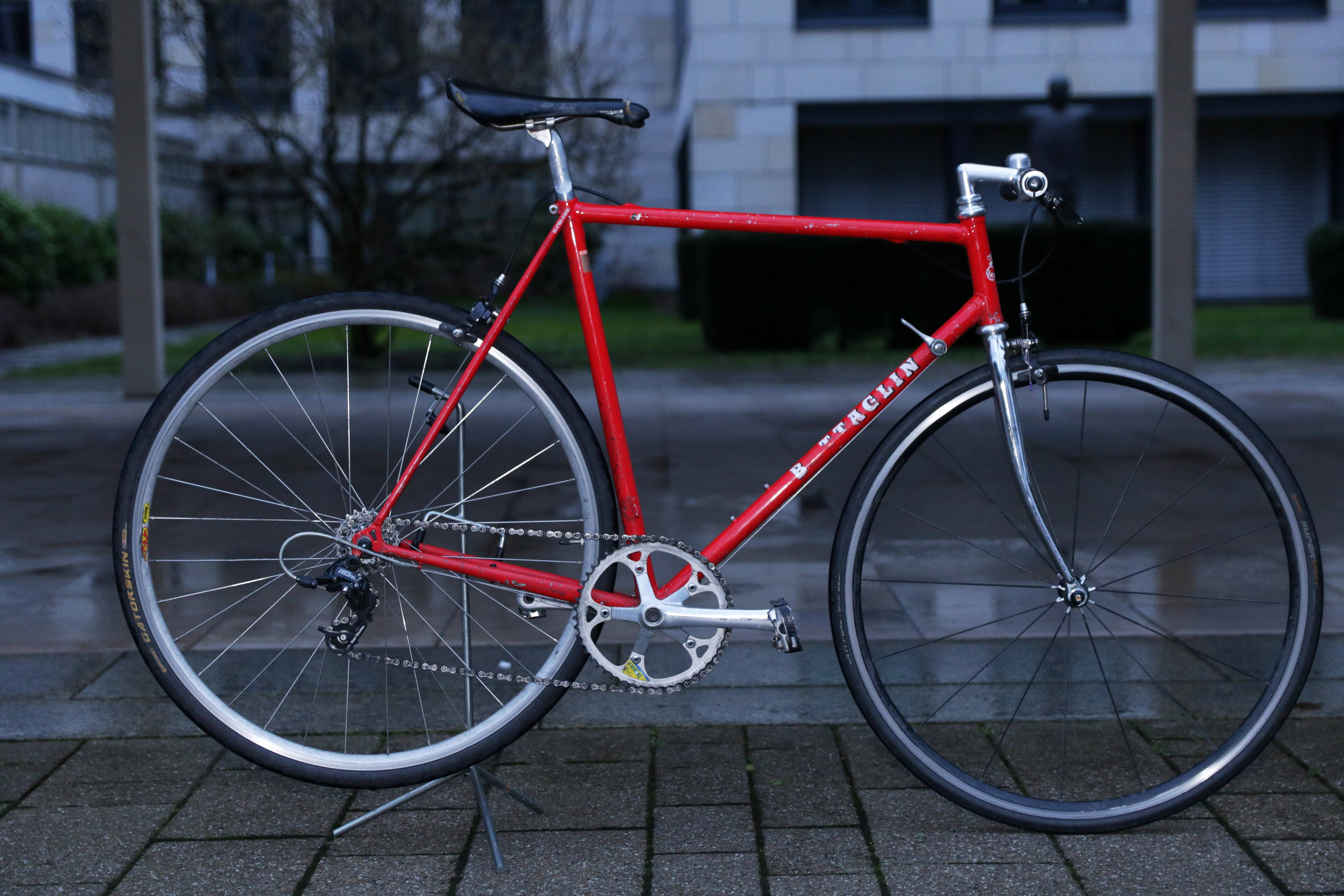
Giovanni Battaglin founded a bike manufacturer after his professional career, producing road bikes.

The 1973 Giro d'Italia that began in Verviers in Belgium and was Battaglin's debut in a grand tour. Battaglin immediately showed promise when he finished third on stage four ahead of Eddy Merckx and José Manuel Fuente. By halfway through the race, Battaglin was sitting in second place overall behind Merckx but lost that placing to Felice Gimondi. Still at the age of 21, the neo-pro astonished the cycling world by finishing third in the race. Battaglin would wear the maglia rosa for five days in the 1975 Giro d'Italia as well as several stage wins and wins in smaller stage races. He also won the King of the Mountains jersey in the 1979 Tour de France, even after he received a penalty for testing positive for doping. Battaglin finished third in the 1980 Giro d'Italia.

The following year on the tenth stage mountain time trial of the 1981 Vuelta a España which was on the long climb to Sierra Nevada, Battaglin won the stage and took over the leader's jersey. The only threat to Battaglin's lead was Pedro Muñoz. Battaglin and his Inoxpran team withstood the challenge from the Spanish and brought Battaglin to his first grand tour victory. Three days later after Battalin's triumph in Spain on 13 May 1981, he began the 1981 Giro d'Italia. On the 19th stage toward the end of the race, Battaglin won the stage to Mareo and took the maglia rosa from Silvano Contini. He withstood the final test – the final stage's individual time trial to win the race in Verona ahead of Tommy Prim. Battaglin was only the second rider after Eddy Merckx to win the Vuelta-Giro double. In the space of one and a half months, Battaglin won two of the grand tours.

== Retirement ==
Battaglin retired after the 1984 season. In 1982 Battaglin started a bicycle manufacturing business with the same name, which he runs from Marostica, Italy. In 2002 the company sponsored the Ceramiche Panaria Fiordo squad.

== Career achievements ==
=== Major results ===
1971
1st Gran Premio Palio del Recioto
1972
1st Overall Giro Ciclistico d'Italia
8th Overall Trophée Peugeot de l'Avenir
1973
1st Giro del Lazio
3rd Overall Giro d'Italia
5th Giro di Toscana
10th Giro dell'Appennino
10th Giro della Provincia di Reggio Calabria
1974
1st Giro dell'Appennino
3rd Giro del Veneto
3rd Trofeo Matteotti
4th Overall Tour de Romandie
5th Giro del Piemonte
6th Overall Giro d'Italia
9th Overall Tour de Suisse
9th GP Montelupo
10th Road race, UCI Road World Championships
1975
1st Overall Giro di Puglia

1st Stage 2

1st Coppa Sabatini
Giro d'Italia

1st Stages 3 & 13 (ITT)
Held after Stages 3 & 13

3rd Giro dell'Umbria
3rd Giro del Friuli
4th Overall Volta a Catalunya

1st Stage 5

4th Giro dell'Appennino
Tour de France

Held after Stages 11 & 12

1976
1st Stage 2 Tour de France
2nd Giro dell'Appennino
5th Tre Valli Varesine
6th Overall Tour de Romandie
6th Züri–Metzgete
6th Giro della Provincia di Reggio Calabria
10th Overall Giro di Puglia
1977
1st GP Montelupo
3rd Coppa Bernocchi
6th Giro del Friuli
8th Overall Tirreno–Adriatico
8th Overall Vuelta a Andalucía
1978
1st Coppa Bernocchi
Tour de Suisse

1st Stages 6, 7 & 8

2nd Overall Ruota d'Oro
2nd Tre Valli Varesine
2nd Trofeo Matteotti
2nd Giro dell'Umbria
5th GP Industria & Artigianato di Larciano
7th Overall Giro di Puglia
1979
1st Overall Tour of the Basque Country

1st Stages 2 & 5b (ITT)

1st Coppa Agostoni
1st Coppa Placci
1st Trofeo Pantalica
1st Trofeo Matteotti
1st Giro della Provincia di Reggio Calabria
2nd Road race, National Road Championships
2nd Giro del Veneto
3rd Overall Tirreno–Adriatico
3rd Giro di Lombardia
4th Overall À travers Lausanne
4th Overall Escalada a Montjuïc
4th Giro dell'Appennino
4th Giro del Friuli
5th Coppa Bernocchi
5th Gran Premio Industria e Commercio di Prato
6th Road race, UCI World Championships
6th Overall Tour de France

1st Mountains classification

7th Gran Premio di Lugano
9th Overall Tour de Suisse

1st Mountains classification
1st Stage 7

1980
1st Milano–Torino
1st Milano–Vignola
1st Coppa Placci
2nd Road race, National Road Championships
3rd Overall Giro d'Italia
3rd Giro del Piemonte
3rd Trofeo Matteotti
4th Overall Giro del Trentino
4th Giro dell'Appennino
4th Gran Premio Industria e Commercio di Prato
4th Giro della Provincia di Reggio Calabria
6th GP Industria & Artigianato di Larciano
8th Giro del Veneto
10th Road race, UCI Road World Championships
10th Coppa Sabatini
1981
1st Overall Giro d'Italia

1st Stage 19

1st Overall Vuelta a España

1st Stage 8b (ITT)

6th Giro dell'Appennino
7th Trofeo Pantalica
8th Tre Valli Varesine
9th Giro della Provincia di Reggio Calabria
10th Giro del Friuli
1983
2nd Road race, National Road Championships
2nd Giro del Friuli
9th Overall Tour of the Basque Country

=== Grand Tour general classification results timeline ===
Grand Tour	1973	1974	1975	1976	1977	1978	1979	1980	1981	1982	1983	1984
Vuelta a España	—	—	—	—	—	—	—	—	1	—	—	—
Giro d'Italia	3	6	18	DNF	46	DNF	—	3	1	—	DNF	50
Tour de France	—	—	DNF	DNF	—	—	6	—	—	DNF	—	DNF

Legend
—	Did not compete
DNF	Did not finish
