= Alfonso Dal Pian =

Italian cyclist

Personal information
- Born: 15 August 1957 (age 69) Genoa, Italy

Cycling career
- Sport: Cycling
- Role: Rider

Alfonso Dal Pian (born 15 August 1957) is an Italian former professional racing cyclist. He rode in one edition of the Tour de France and one edition of the Vuelta a España.
