= Vuelta a Aragón =

Bicycle road race in Spain

Race details
- Date: Mid-May
- Region: Aragón, Spain
- English name: Tour of Aragón
- Local name: Vuelta a Aragón (in Spanish)
- Discipline: Road
- Competition: UCI Europe Tour
- Type: Stage race
- Web site: www.vueltaaragon.es

History
- First edition: 1939
- Editions: 45 (as at 2019)
- First winner: Antonio Andrés (ESP)
- Most wins: Leonardo Piepoli (ITA) (3 wins)
- Most recent: Eduard Prades (ESP)

Vuelta a Aragón is a professional bicycle road race held in Spain in May of each year. The event was first run in 1939, and was not held between 2006 and 2017. The future of the race is uncertain; there had been plans to organise it again, but an effort to revive it in 2009 failed due to a lack of sufficient sponsorship to be held. It was not until May 2018 that another race was organized; it was added to the UCI road calendar as a 2.1 road race event on the Europe Tour.

== Winners ==
| Year | Country | Rider | Team |
|---|---|---|---|
| 1939 | Spain | Antonio Andrés | |
| 1939– 1953 | No race | | |
| 1954 | Spain | Francisco Alomar | |
| 1955– 1964 | No race | | |
| 1965 | Spain | José Pujol | |
| 1966 | Spain | Salvador Canet | |
| 1967 | Spain | José Luis Uribezubia | Kas–Kaskol |
| 1968 | Spain | José Manuel Abellán | |
| 1969 | Spain | Jesús Manzaneque | La Casera–Peña Bahamontes |
| 1970 | Spain | Pedro Santamaría | Werner |
| 1971 | Spain | Ramón Sáez | Werner |
| 1972 | No race | | |
| 1973 | Spain | Jesús Manzaneque | La Casera–Peña Bahamontes |
| 1974 | Spain | Francisco Elorriaga | Kas–Kaskol |
| 1975 | Spain | Agustín Tamames | Super Ser |
| 1976 | Spain | Francisco Elorriaga | Super Ser–Zeus |
| 1977 | Spain | Javier Nazabal | Kas–Campagnolo |
| 1978 | Spain | Jesús Suárez Cueva | Kas–Campagnolo |
| 1979 | Spain | Roque Moya | Novostil–Helios–Alan |
| 1980 | Spain | Faustino Fernández Ovies | Henninger–Aquila Rossa–Zeus |
| 1981 | Spain | Antonio Coll | Colchon C.R |
| 1982 | Spain | Carlos Hernández | Reynolds |
| 1983 | Spain | Pedro Delgado | Reynolds |
| 1984 | Spain | José Recio | Kelme |
| 1985 | Spain | José Recio | Kelme–Merckx |
| 1986 | Switzerland | Stephan Joho | Kas |
| 1987 | Spain | Anselmo Fuerte | BH Sport |
| 1988 | Spain | Francisco Javier Mauleón | Kas–Canal 10 |
| 1989 | Spain | Iñaki Gastón | Kelme |
| 1990 | Belgium | Nico Emonds | Teka |
| 1991 | Colombia | Edgar Corredor | Sicasal–Acral |
| 1992 | Colombia | Luis Herrera | Postobón |
| 1993 | Spain | Alfonso Gutiérrez | Artiach |
| 1994 | Spain | Marino Alonso | Banesto |
| 1995 | Spain | Fernando Escartín | Mapei–GB–Latexco |
| 1996 | Spain | Melcior Mauri | ONCE |
| 1997 | Spain | Aitor Garmendia | Banesto |
| 1998 | Spain | Aitor Garmendia | Banesto |
| 1999 | Spain | Juan Carlos Domínguez | Vitalicio Seguros |
| 2000 | Italy | Leonardo Piepoli | Banesto |
| 2001 | Spain | Juan Carlos Domínguez | iBanesto.com |
| 2002 | Italy | Leonardo Piepoli | iBanesto.com |
| 2003 | Italy | Leonardo Piepoli | iBanesto.com |
| 2004 | Italy | Stefano Garzelli | Vini Caldirola–Nobili Rubinetterie |
| 2005 | Spain | Rubén Plaza | Comunidad Valenciana–Elche |
| 2006– 2017 | No race | | |
| 2018 | Spain | Jaime Rosón | Movistar Team |
| 2019 | Spain | Eduard Prades | Movistar Team |
