= Rasos de Peguera =

Spanish mountain

Coordinates: 42°8′32″N 1°45′45″E

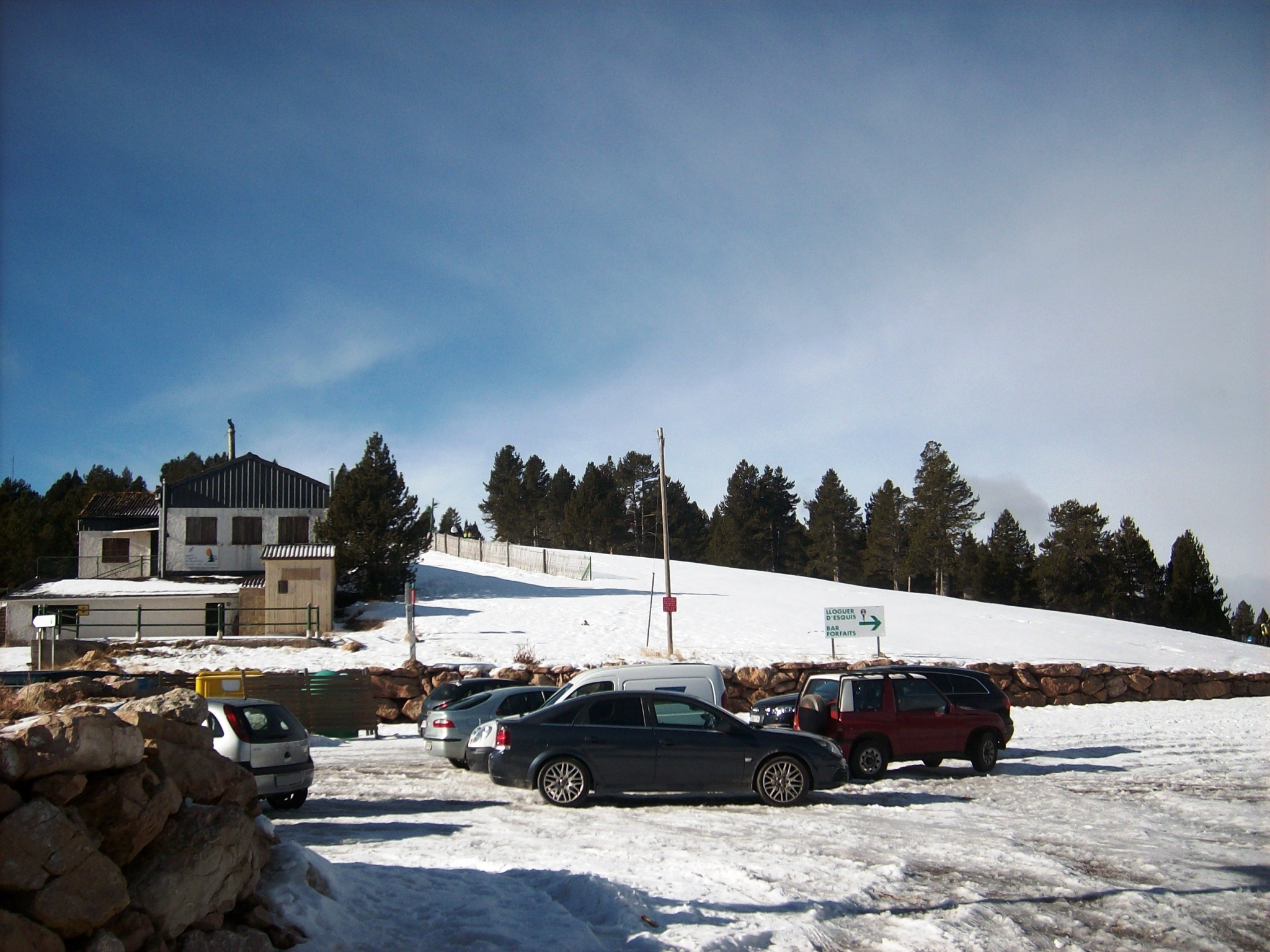
The closed ski resort

Rasos de Peguera is a former ski resort located near Berga, in Catalonia (Spain). Rasos de Peguera was one of the first places where skiing was practiced in Catalonia and was once the closest ski resort to Barcelona. The alpine ski resort opened in 1975 and closed in 2004 due to lack of reliable snow, although attempts have since been underway to reopen it.
