= Régis Clère =

French cyclist

Personal information
- Full name: Régis Clère
- Born: 15 August 1956 Langres, France
- Died: 9 June 2012 (aged 55)

Cycling career
- Sport: Cycling
- Discipline: Road
- Role: Rider

Professional teams
- 1981–1984: Miko–Mercier–Vivagel
- 1985: Peugeot–Shell–Michelin
- 1986: Miko–Carlos
- 1987–1989: Teka

Major wins
- Grand Tours Tour de France 3 individual stages (1983, 1987) Vuelta a España 2 individual stages (1981) One-day races and Classics National Road Race Championships (1982)

Régis Clère (15 August 1956 – 9 June 2012) was a French professional road bicycle racer.

Clère was born in Langres. During his career, he won three stages in the Tour de France. He won one of these stages, in the 1987 Tour de France, after he was almost eliminated after finishing outside the time limit in the previous stage, but the Tour de France jury allowed him to continue the race. In 1981, he won two stages of the Vuelta a España, and the French National Road Race Championships the following year. He also competed in the individual road race event at the 1980 Summer Olympics.

Clère died, aged 55, in Dijon during a surgical procedure.

== Major results ==
1979
1st Road race, Mediterranean Games
1st Stage 5b (ITT) Tour de l'Avenir
1980
1st Stage 6 (ITT) Tour de l'Avenir
3rd Road race, National Amateur Road Championships
3rd Grand Prix de France
1981 (2 pro wins)
1st Prologue & Stage 15b Vuelta a España
2nd Overall Etoile de Bessèges
3rd Overall Critérium International
2nd GP de Fourmies
8th GP de la Ville de Rennes
10th Overall Paris–Nice
10th Tour du Haut Var
1982
1st Road race, National Road Championships
Combativity award Tour de France
1st Prologue Étoile des Espoirs
2nd GP Ouest-France
1983
1st Stage 11 Tour de France
2nd Trophée des Grimpeurs
3rd Grand Prix de la côte normande
4th Overall Critérium International
7th Trofeo Baracchi
8th Overall Étoile des Espoirs
8th GP Ouest-France
9th Overall Tour Midi-Pyrénées
9th GP de Fourmies
1984
3rd Overall Circuit Cycliste Sarthe
7th Overall Tour de l'Oise
10th GP Ouest-France
1985
7th Overall Tour du Limousin
7th Paris–Tours
1986
3rd Grand Prix de Mauléon-Moulins
7th Le Samyn
1987
1st Overall Tour Midi-Pyrénées

1st Stage 3

1st Stages 16 & 23 Tour de France
1st Stage 5 Vuelta a Galicia
1st Route du Berry
1988
2nd Polynormande
5th Overall Route du Sud
