= Amilcare Sgalbazzi =

Italian cyclist

Personal information
- Born: 11 June 1955 (age 71) Genivolta, Italy

Cycling career
- Sport: Cycling
- Role: Rider

Amilcare Sgalbazzi (born 11 June 1955) is an Italian former professional racing cyclist. He rode in two editions of the Tour de France, seven editions of the Giro d'Italia and one edition of the Vuelta a España.

== Major results ==
1975
2nd Overall Giro Ciclistico d'Italia
1979
1st Stage 18 Giro d'Italia
1982
9th Giro dell'Etna
