= Rafael Ladrón =

Spanish cyclist

Personal information
- Born: 3 October 1952 (age 74) Vitoria-Gasteiz, Spain

Cycling career
- Sport: Cycling

Rafael Ladrón (born 3 October 1952) is a Spanish former cyclist. He competed in the individual road race event at the 1976 Summer Olympics. He also rode in two editions of the Tour de France, four editions of the Vuelta a España, and one edition of the Giro d'Italia.
