= Hans Vonk (cyclist) =

Dutch cyclist (born 1959)

Personal information
- Born: 15 August 1959 (age 67) Arnhem, the Netherlands

Cycling career
- Sport: Cycling
- Disciplines: Road cycling Track cycling
- Role: Rider
- Rider type: endurance

Professional teams
- 1981: HB Alarmsystemen
- 1982: AMKO Sport

Hans Vonk (born 15 August 1959 in Arnhem) is a Dutch male track cyclist and road cyclist. He was professional between 1981 and 1982. He became one time Dutch Track Cycling Champion in the 1 km time trial and competed at the 1981 UCI Track Cycling World Championships.

== Career ==
=== Track cycling ===
At the Dutch National Track Championships he became national champion in the 1 km time trial in 1980 after winning the two bronze medals in 1978 and 1979. He further won a silver medal in the tandem discipline in 1978 and a bronze medal in the pursuit for amateur riders in 1980. Vonk was selected to compete in the points race event at the 1981 UCI Track Cycling World Championships.

=== Road cycling ===
As an amateur cyclist he won competed in local cycle races in the late 1970s and won the Tour of South-East Friesland. In 1980 he won the sixth stage of the Tour of Slovakia. He became professional in 1981 and joined the Dutch team HB Alarmsystemen and the year afterwards the Dutch team AMKO Sport. As of 2011 he is still taking part in cycling races.

== See also ==
- Netherlands at the 1981 UCI Track Cycling World Championships
