= Heddie Nieuwdorp =

Dutch cyclist

Personal information
- Born: 28 March 1956 (age 70) Middelburg, Netherlands

Cycling career
- Sport: Cycling
- Current team: Retired
- Discipline: Road
- Role: Rider

Professional teams
- 1980–1981: HB Alarmsystemen
- 1982: Splendor–Wickes Bouwmarkt
- 1983: Beckers Snacks–Bicky Burger
- 1984–1985: AVP–Viditel–Concorde
- 1986: Transvemij–Van Schilt

Major wins
- Grand Tours Vuelta a España 1 individual stage (1981)

Heddie Nieuwdorp (born 28 March 1956) is a Dutch former road cyclist. Professional from 1980 to 1986, he notably won a stage of the 1981 Vuelta a España and finished third in the 1984 La Flèche Wallonne.

== Major results ==
1980
1st Ronde van Kwadendamme
1981
1st Stage 5 Vuelta a España
2nd Ronde van Limburg
1982
5th Nationale Sluitingprijs
1983
3rd Omloop Schelde-Durme
5th E3 Prijs Vlaanderen
1984
3rd La Flèche Wallonne
