= Erich Jagsch =

Austrian cyclist

Personal information
- Born: 31 August 1955 (age 71) Klosterneuburg, Austria

Cycling career
- Sport: Cycling
- Role: Rider

Erich Jagsch (born 31 August 1955) is a former Austrian racing cyclist. He rode in the 1980 Tour de France.
