= Wies van Dongen =

Dutch cyclist (1931–2022)

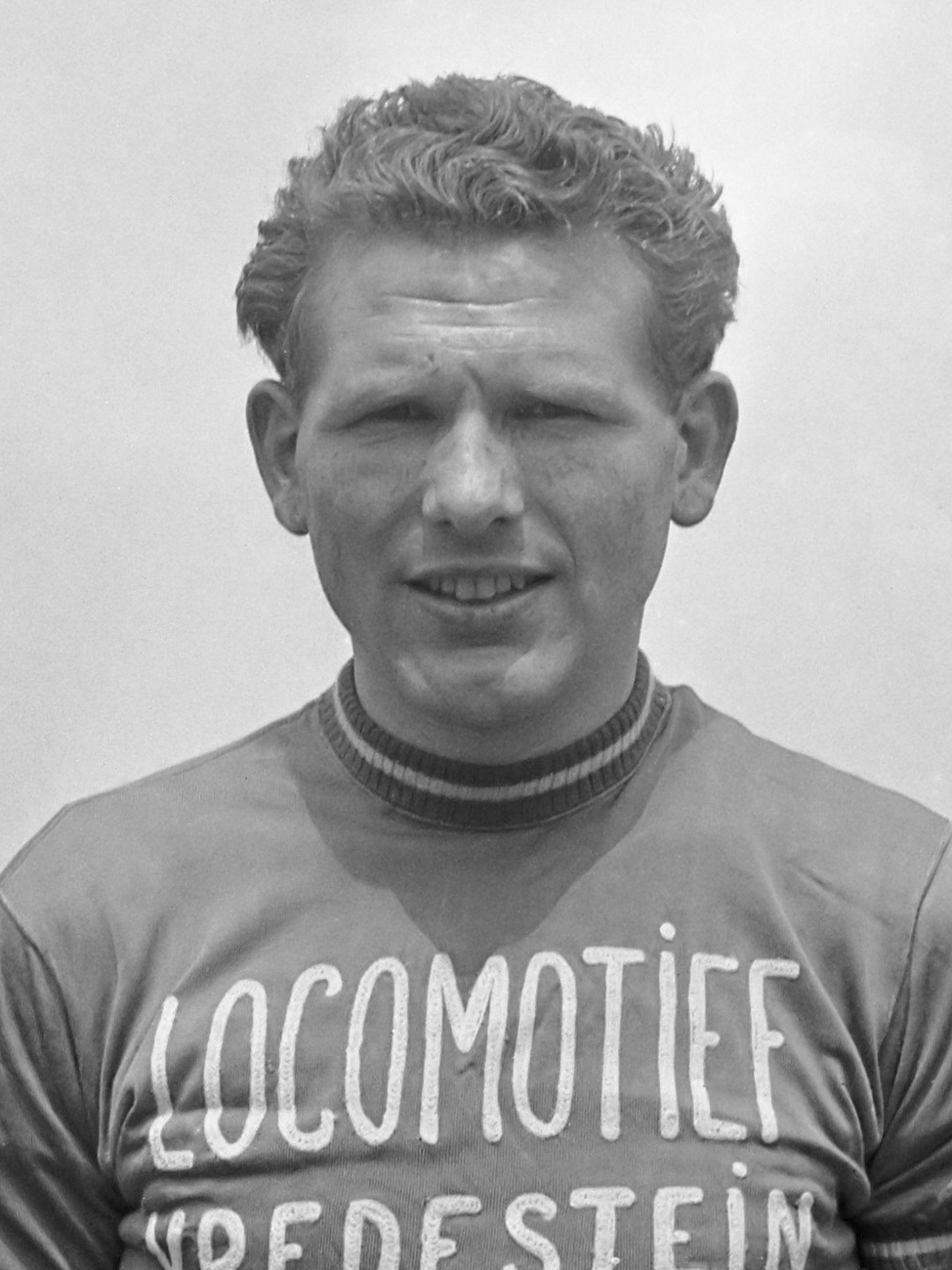
- Van Dongen in 1956

Personal information
- Born: 30 July 1931 Breda, Netherlands
- Died: 25 May 2022 (aged 90)

Cycling career
- Sport: Cycling
- Role: Rider

Wies van Dongen (30 July 1931 – 25 May 2022) was a Dutch professional racing cyclist. He rode in two editions of the Tour de France, retiring both in 1955 and 1956.
