= Didier Lebaud =

French cyclist

Personal information
- Born: 2 December 1954 (age 71) Châteauneuf-sur-Charente, France

Cycling career
- Sport: Cycling
- Role: Rider

Didier Lebaud (born 2 December 1954) is a former French racing cyclist. He rode in the 1980 and 1981 Tour de France.
