= Jørgen Marcussen =

Danish cyclist (born 1950)

Personal information
- Full name: Jørgen Marcussen
- Born: 15 May 1950 (age 76) Nødebo, Denmark

Cycling career
- Sport: Cycling
- Discipline: Road
- Role: Rider

Professional teams
- 1976–1977: Furzi-Vibor
- 1978: Avia-Groene Leeuw
- 1979: Magniflex–Famcucine
- 1980: Bianchi–Piaggio
- 1981: Inoxpran
- 1982: Termolan
- 1983: Pinarello
- 1984: Dromedario
- 1985: Baunsöe-Peugeot
- 1986–1989: Pepsi Cola-Fanini
- 1989: Eurocar-Vetta-Galli

Major wins
- 1980 Giro d'Italia stage 5 (TT). 1986 Trofeo Matteotti.Danmark Rundt stage 4.

Jørgen Marcussen (born 15 May 1950) is a Danish former racing cyclist.

He competed, as an amateur, in the individual road race and team time trial events at the 1972 Summer Olympics. As an amateur he also became national champion in team time trial in 1970, and in individual time trial in 1975.

From 1976 he rode as a professional, predominantly on less prominent teams.

In the 1978 UCI Road World Championships Jørgen Marcussen created an upset by winning a bronze medal, behind Gerrie Knetemann and Francesco Moser. He also managed to finish 4th overall in the 1981 Vuelta a España, which was the best result by a Dane in a Grand tour at the time. It was a feat that was not expected and not surpassed until Bjarne Riis came 3rd in the 1995 Tour de France.

Jørgen Marcussen is married to Olympic cyclist Karina Skibby.

== Major results ==
1974
4th Overall GP Tell
1975
1st Overall GP Tell

1st Stage 6

1976
3rd Trofeo Baracchi
7th Overall Volta a Catalunya
1977
3rd Grand Prix des Nations
1978
3rd Road race, UCI Road World Championships
1979
2nd GP Forli
5th Milano–Torino
1980
1st Stage 5 Giro d'Italia (ITT)
3rd Giro dell'Emilia
8th Road race, UCI Road World Championships
1981
4th Overall Vuelta a España
1986
1st Trofeo Matteotti
1st Stage 4 Danmark Rundt
1987
10th Gran Premio Città di Camaiore
1988
2nd Trofeo Matteotti
