= Pedro Muñoz (cyclist) =

Spanish cyclist (born 1958)

Pedro Muñóz
Personal information
- Full name: Pedro Muñóz Machín Rodríguez
- Born: November 6, 1958 (age 67) Mieres, Spain

Cycling career
- Sport: Cycling
- Current team: Retired
- Discipline: Road
- Role: Rider

Major wins
- Mountains classification 1986 Giro d'Italia

Pedro Muñóz Machín Rodríguez (born 6 November 1958 in Mieres) is a former Spanish professional road bicycle racer. He won a stage in the 1981 Vuelta a España and finished on the podium in 2nd place overall.

He received a penalty for testing positive for the stimulant methylphenidate (Ritalin) on stage 17 of the 1982 Vuelta a España. He finished the race in 25th overall. In 1983 he finished in 8th place overall at the Vuelta and won a stage in the 1983 Giro d'Italia finishing in 11th place overall. In 1984 he rode the Tour de France for the first time and performed well. He finished 2nd to Greg LeMond in the Young rider classification and 8th place overall.

In 1985 he Did Not Start the 9th stage of the Vuelta and Did Not Finish the 15th stage of the Tour. In the 1986 Giro d'Italia he would have the 4th and final top 10 in a Grand Tour placing by finishing in 10th place. He also won the King of the Mountains jersey. He completed both the 1987 Tour and Giro finishing around the top 20 overall in both races. His final Grand Tour was the 1989 Vuelta a España where he came in 34th place.

== Palmarès ==
1981
Vuelta a España:

Winner stage 15A
2nd place overall classification

1982
GP Navarra
Trofeo Masferrer
Vuelta a las Tres Provincias
1983
Vuelta a Castilla
Vuelta Ciclista Asturias
Giro d'Italia:

Winner stage 11

Vuelta a España:

8th place overall classification

1984
Prueba Villafranca de Ordizia
Tour de France:

8th place overall classification

1985
Prueba Villafranca de Ordizia
1986
Giro d'Italia:

10th place overall classification
Winner mountains classification

== See also ==
- List of doping cases in cycling
