= Ángel Arroyo =

Spanish cyclist (1956–2026)

Personal information
- Full name: Ángel Arroyo Lanchas
- Born: 2 August 1956 El Barraco, Spain
- Died: 4 October 2026 (aged 70) Ávila, Spain

Cycling career
- Sport: Cycling
- Discipline: Road
- Role: Rider
- Rider type: Climber

Professional teams
- -: ZOR-Gemeaz-Cusin
- -: Reynolds

Major wins
- Grand Tours Tour de France 2 individual stages (1983, 1984) Vuelta a España 2 individual stages (1981, 1982)

Ángel Arroyo Lanchas (2 August 1956 – 4 October 2026) was a Spanish professional road bicycle racer. In the 1983 Tour de France, Arroyo won one stage and finished in 2nd place in the general classification.

In stage 17 of the 1982 Vuelta a España, while leading the race, Arroyo tested positive for methylphenidate, and got a 10-minute time penalty. This effectively stripped him of victory and put him back in 13th place.

Arroyo died on 4 October 2026, at the age of 70.

== Major results ==
1977
Tour of Ireland
1979
Vuelta a los Valles Mineros
1980
Clásica a los Puertos de Guadarrama
Vuelta a Castilla
1981
Vuelta a España:

Winner stage 18
6th place overall classification

Vuelta a Asturias
1982
Vuelta a España:

Winner stage 15B

Subida a Arrate
Sierra Madrid
Memoria Santi Andia
1983
Tour de France:

Winner stage 15
2nd place overall classification

1984
Tour de France:

Winner stage 19
6th place overall classification

1986
GP San Froilan Lugo

== See also ==
- List of doping cases in cycling
