= Vicente Belda =

Spanish cyclist (born 1954)

Personal information
- Full name: Vicente Belda Vicedo
- Born: 12 September 1954 (age 72) Alfafara, Spain

Cycling career
- Sport: Cycling
- Current team: Fuerteventura–Canarias Team
- Discipline: Road
- Role: Team Manager
- Rider type: All-rounder

Professional teams
- 1978–1979: Transmallorca
- 1980–1988: Kelme

Managerial teams
- 2002?–2006: Comunitat Valenciana
- 2007–: Fuerteventura–Canarias Team

Major wins
- Grand Tours Giro d'Italia 1 individual stage (1982) Vuelta a España 2 individual stages (1978, 1981) Stage races Volta a Catalunya (1979) Volta a la Comunitat Valenciana (1979) Setmana Catalana de Ciclisme (1987)

Vicente Belda Vicedo (born 12 September 1954) is a Spanish former professional road bicycle racer, born in Alfafara. He is now the manager of Spanish UCI Professional Continental outfit Fuerteventura–Canarias. Until 2006 he was the directeur sportif of Comunidad Valenciana, which was highly involved in the Operación Puerto doping case.

Belda received a penalty for testing positive for the stimulant Methylphenidate (Ritalin) on stage 17 of the 1982 Vuelta a España.

== Major results ==
1978
1st, Stage 16, Vuelta a España
1st, Overall, Vuelta a Cantabria
1979
1st, Overall, Volta a Catalunya
1st, Stage 4, Vuelta a Andalucía
1st, Overall, Volta a la Comunitat Valenciana

1st Prologue

1980
1st, Stage 6, Tour of the Basque Country
1981
3rd Overall Vuelta a España

1st, Stage 13

1st, Stage 4, Volta a Catalunya
1982
1st, Clásica a los Puertos de Guadarrama
1st, Stage 3, Vuelta a La Rioja
1st, Stage 16, Giro d'Italia
1983
1st, Subida al Naranco
1st, Stage 3, Tour of the Basque Country
1984
1st, Subida al Naranco
1st, Subida a Urkiola
1st, Overall, Volta a Galicia

1st Stage 3

1985
1st, Escalada a Montjuïc
1st, Stage 8 & 10, Vuelta a Colombia
1986
1st, Escalada a Montjuïc
1987
1st, Setmana Catalana de Ciclisme

== See also ==
- List of doping cases in cycling
