= Teka (cycling team) =

Spanish cycling team

Team information
- Registered: Spain
- Founded: 1976
- Disbanded: 1990
- Discipline: Road

Team name history
- 1976–1980 1981 1982–1990: Teka; Teka–Campagnolo; Teka

Teka was a Spanish professional cycling team that existed from 1976 to 1990. The main sponsor for its entire history was the multinational kitchen and bath company Teka. The team's major victory was the general classification of the 1982 Vuelta a España with Marino Lejarreta.
