= Amaya Seguros (cycling team) =

Spanish cycling team

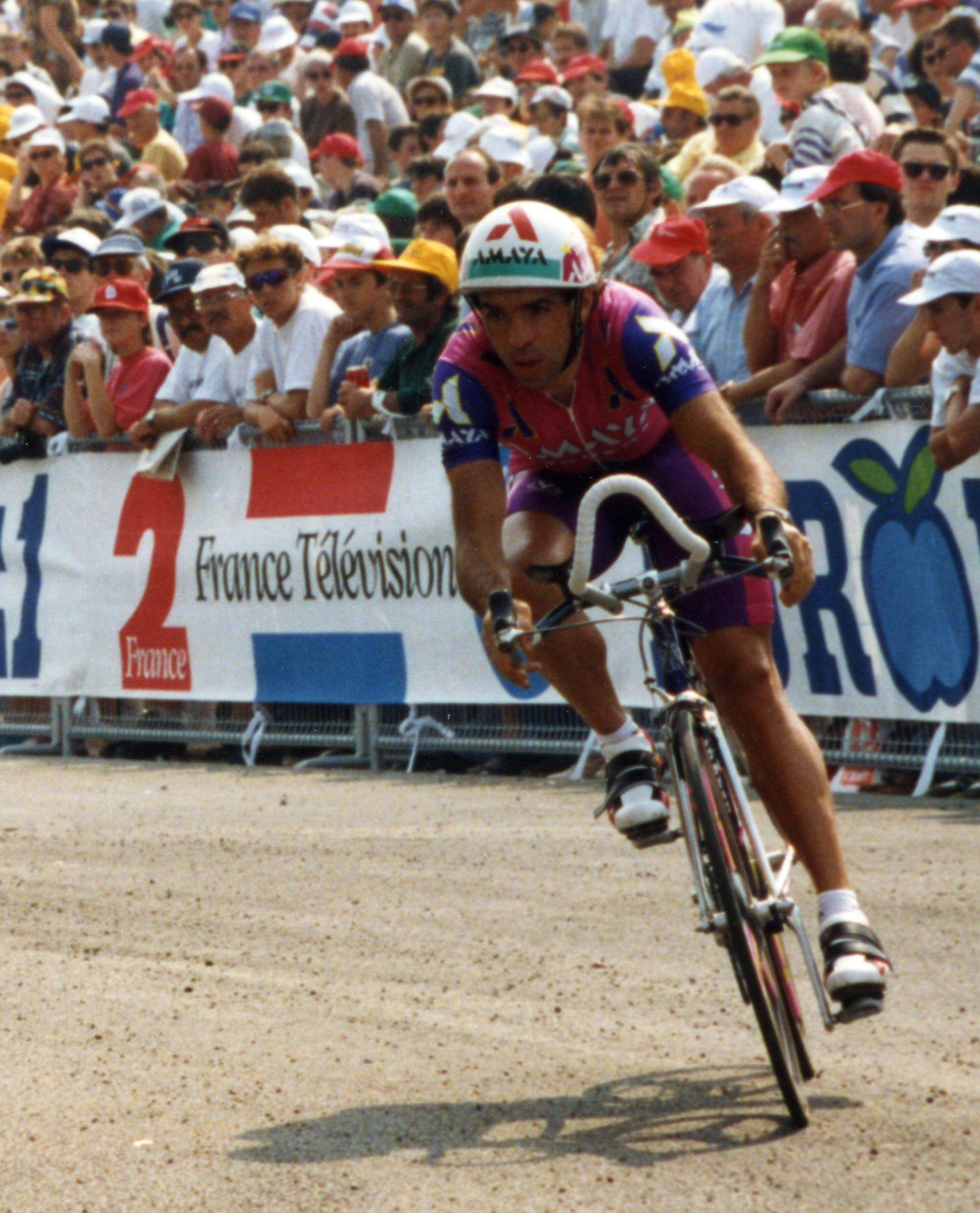
- Javier Murguialday at the 1993 Tour de France

Team information
- Registered: Spain
- Founded: 1979
- Disbanded: 1993
- Discipline: Road

Team name history
- 1979 January–April 1980 April–December 1980 1981 1982 1983–1985 1986 1987–1989 1990 1991–1993: Moliner–Vereco; Fosforera–Vereco MG; Zor–Vereco; Zor–Helios–Novostil; Zor–Helios–Gemeaz Cusin; Zor–Gemeaz Cusin; Zor–BH; BH; BH–Amaya Seguros; Amaya Seguros

Amaya Seguros was a Spanish professional cycling team that existed from 1979 to 1993.

Team Zor had many co-sponsors over their history, to include Vereco, Campagnolo, Helios, Novostil, Gemeaz Cusin, and BH.

Rossin Bikes was also a co-sponsor and supplied their bicycles for the 1982-83 seasons.

The team 1982 Direttore Sportivo was Javier Minguez Bellosta.

Faustino Rupérez and Álvaro Pino won the 1980 and 1986 editions of the Vuelta a España, respectively.
