= 1979 Tour de France, Prologue to Stage 12 =

Cycling race stages

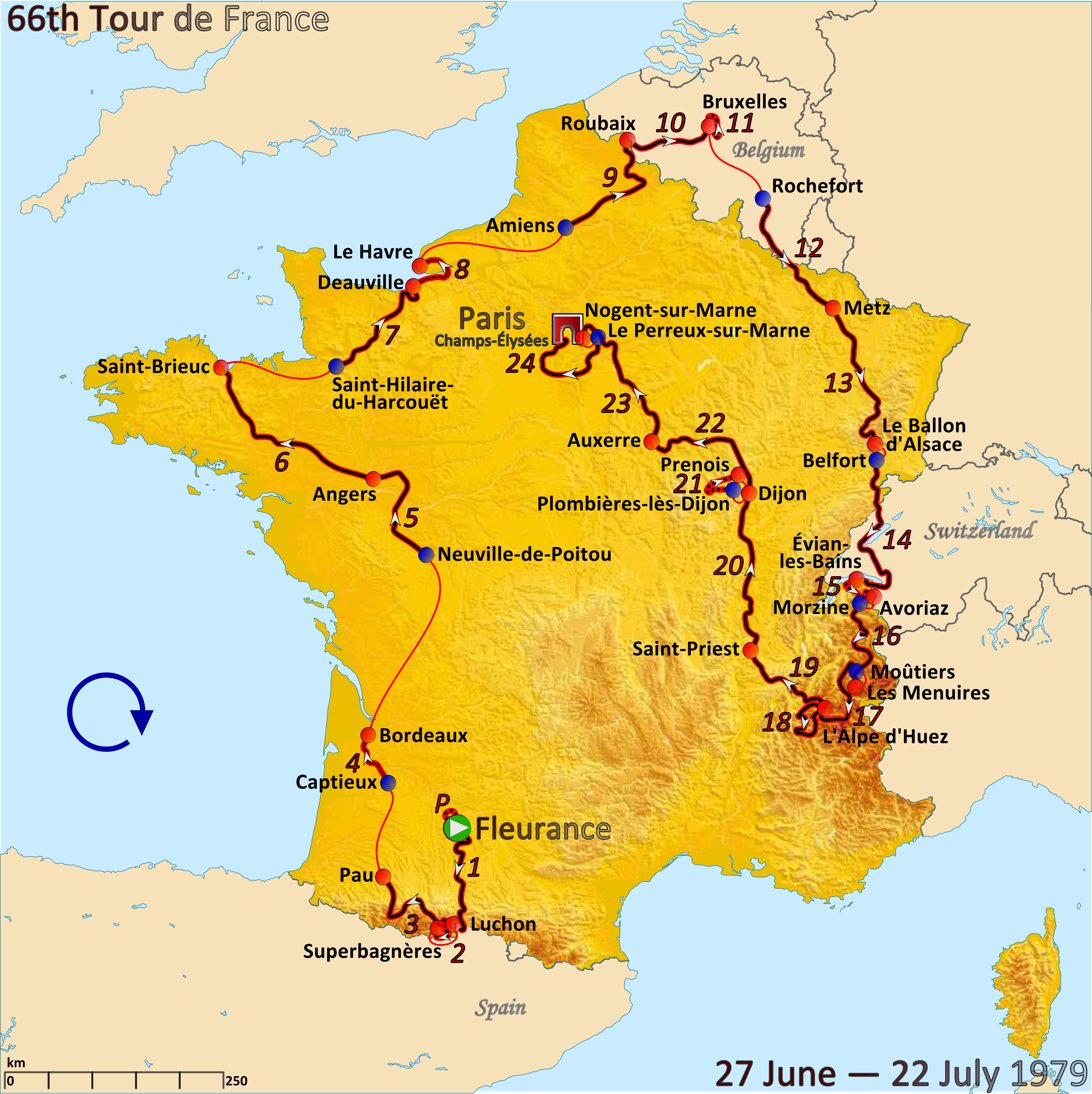
Route of the 1979 Tour de France

The 1979 Tour de France was the 66th edition of the Tour de France, one of cycling's Grand Tours. The Tour began in Fleurance with a prologue individual time trial on 27 June, and Stage 12 occurred on 9 July with a flat stage to Metz. The race finished in Paris on 22 July.

== Prologue ==
27 June 1979 – Fleurance to Fleurance, 5 km (3.1 mi) (ITT)

Prologue result and general classification after prologue

Rank	Rider	Team	Time
1	Gerrie Knetemann (NED)	TI–Raleigh	5' 59"
2	Knut Knudsen (NOR)	Bianchi–Faema	+ 4"
3	Joop Zoetemelk (NED)	Miko–Mercier	s.t.
4	Bernard Hinault (FRA)	Renault–Gitane	s.t.
5	Yves Hézard (FRA)	Peugeot–Esso	+ 5"
6	Dietrich Thurau (FRG)	IJsboerke–Warncke	s.t.
7	Jan Raas (NED)	TI–Raleigh	+ 6"
8	Hennie Kuiper (NED)	Peugeot–Esso	+ 11"
9	Jacques Bossis (FRA)	Peugeot–Esso	+ 12"
10	Jos Jacobs (BEL)	IJsboerke–Warncke	+ 13"

== Stage 1 ==
28 June 1979 – Fleurance to Luchon, 225 km (140 mi)

Stage 1 result

Rank	Rider	Team	Time
1	René Bittinger (FRA)	Flandria–Ça va seul	6h 51' 12"
2	Jean-René Bernaudeau (FRA)	Renault–Gitane	+ 8"
3	Giovanni Battaglin (ITA)	Inoxpran	+ 32"
4	Robert Alban (FRA)	Fiat–La France	+ 45"
5	Bernard Hinault (FRA)	Renault–Gitane	+ 47"
6	Gianbattista Baronchelli (ITA)	Magniflex–Famcucine	s.t.
7	Hennie Kuiper (NED)	Peugeot–Esso	s.t.
8	Joop Zoetemelk (NED)	Miko–Mercier	s.t.
9	Michel Pollentier (BEL)	Splendor	s.t.
10	Alain Meslet (FRA)	Fiat–La France	s.t.

General classification after stage 1

Rank	Rider	Team	Time
1	Jean-René Bernaudeau (FRA)	Renault–Gitane	6h 57' 38"
2	René Bittinger (FRA)	Flandria–Ça va seul	+ 4"
3	Bernard Hinault (FRA)	Renault–Gitane	+ 24"
4	Joop Zoetemelk (NED)	Miko–Mercier	s.t.
5	Giovanni Battaglin (ITA)	Inoxpran	+ 28"
6	Hennie Kuiper (NED)	Peugeot–Esso	+ 31"
7	Gery Verlinden (BEL)	IJsboerke–Warncke	+ 36"
8	Michel Pollentier (BEL)	Splendor	+ 41"
9	Sven-Åke Nilsson (SWE)	Miko–Mercier	s.t.
10	Gianbattista Baronchelli (ITA)	Magniflex–Famcucine	+ 42"

== Stage 2 ==
29 June 1979 – Luchon to Superbagnères, 24 km (15 mi) (ITT)

Stage 2 result

Rank	Rider	Team	Time
1	Bernard Hinault (FRA)	Renault–Gitane	53' 59"
2	Joaquim Agostinho (POR)	Flandria–Ça va seul	+ 11"
3	Joop Zoetemelk (NED)	Miko–Mercier	+ 53"
4	Hennie Kuiper (NED)	Peugeot–Esso	+ 1' 42"
5	Sven-Åke Nilsson (SWE)	Miko–Mercier	+ 1' 48"
6	Paul Wellens (BEL)	TI–Raleigh	+ 2' 12"
7	Giovanni Battaglin (ITA)	Inoxpran	+ 2' 15"
8	Mariano Martínez (FRA)	La Redoute–Motobécane	+ 2' 28"
9	Gianbattista Baronchelli (ITA)	Magniflex–Famcucine	+ 2' 48"
10	Gerrie Knetemann (NED)	TI–Raleigh	+ 2' 51"

General classification after stage 2

Rank	Rider	Team	Time
1	Bernard Hinault (FRA)	Renault–Gitane	7h 52' 01"
2	Joop Zoetemelk (NED)	Miko–Mercier	+ 53"
3	Joaquim Agostinho (POR)	Flandria–Ça va seul	s.t.
4	Hennie Kuiper (NED)	Peugeot–Esso	+ 1' 49"
5	Sven-Åke Nilsson (SWE)	Miko–Mercier	+ 2' 15"
6	Giovanni Battaglin (ITA)	Inoxpran	+ 2' 19"
7	Paul Wellens (BEL)	TI–Raleigh	+ 2' 51"
8	Mariano Martínez (FRA)	La Redoute–Motobécane	+ 3' 00"
9	Gianbattista Baronchelli (ITA)	Magniflex–Famcucine	+ 3' 06"
10	Michel Pollentier (BEL)	Splendor	+ 3' 09"

== Stage 3 ==
30 June 1979 – Luchon to Pau, 180 km (110 mi)

Stage 3 result

Rank	Rider	Team	Time
1	Bernard Hinault (FRA)	Renault–Gitane	4h 58' 29"
2	Rudy Pevenage (BEL)	IJsboerke–Warncke	s.t.
3	Gianbattista Baronchelli (ITA)	Magniflex–Famcucine	s.t.
4	Joop Zoetemelk (NED)	Miko–Mercier	s.t.
5	Claude Criquielion (BEL)	Kas	s.t.
6	Eddy Schepers (BEL)	Daf Trucks	s.t.
7	André Dierickx (BEL)	IJsboerke–Warncke	s.t.
8	Mariano Martínez (FRA)	La Redoute–Motobécane	s.t.
9	Giovanni Battaglin (ITA)	Inoxpran	s.t.
10	Sven-Åke Nilsson (SWE)	Miko–Mercier	s.t.

General classification after stage 3

Rank	Rider	Team	Time
1	Bernard Hinault (FRA)	Renault–Gitane	12h 50' 30"
2	Joop Zoetemelk (NED)	Miko–Mercier	+ 53"
3	Joaquim Agostinho (POR)	Flandria–Ça va seul	s.t.
4	Hennie Kuiper (NED)	Peugeot–Esso	+ 1' 49"
5	Sven-Åke Nilsson (SWE)	Miko–Mercier	+ 2' 15"
6	Giovanni Battaglin (ITA)	Inoxpran	+ 2' 19"
7	Mariano Martínez (FRA)	La Redoute–Motobécane	+ 3' 00"
8	Gianbattista Baronchelli (ITA)	Magniflex–Famcucine	+ 3' 06"
9	Michel Pollentier (BEL)	Splendor	+ 3' 09"
10	Jean-René Bernaudeau (FRA)	Renault–Gitane	+ 4' 17"

== Stage 4 ==
1 July 1979 – Captieux to Bordeaux, 87 km (54 mi) (TTT)

Stage 4 result

Rank	Team	Time
1	TI–Raleigh	1h 47' 15"
2	IJsboerke–Warncke	+ 22"
3	Peugeot–Esso	+ 1' 11"
4	Miko–Mercier	+ 1' 48"
5	Renault–Gitane	+ 2' 29"
6	Flandria–Ça va seul	+ 3' 00"
7	Kas	+ 4' 06"
8	Magniflex–Famcucine	+ 4' 15"
9	Daf Trucks	+ 5' 10"
10	Bianchi–Faema	+ 6' 17"

General classification after stage 4

Rank	Rider	Team	Time
1	Bernard Hinault (FRA)	Renault–Gitane	14h 40' 14"
2	Joop Zoetemelk (NED)	Miko–Mercier	+ 12"
3	Hennie Kuiper (NED)	Peugeot–Esso	+ 31"
4	Joaquim Agostinho (POR)	Flandria–Ça va seul	+ 1' 24"
5	Sven-Åke Nilsson (SWE)	Miko–Mercier	+ 1' 34"
6	Ueli Sutter (SUI)	TI–Raleigh	+ 2' 28"
7	Gery Verlinden (BEL)	IJsboerke–Warncke	+ 4' 16"
8	Jean-René Bernaudeau (FRA)	Renault–Gitane	+ 4' 17"
9	Gianbattista Baronchelli (ITA)	Magniflex–Famcucine	+ 4' 52"
10	André Dierickx (BEL)	IJsboerke–Warncke	+ 6' 27"

== Stage 5 ==
2 July 1979 – Neuville-de-Poitou to Angers, 145 km (90 mi)

Stage 5 result

Rank	Rider	Team	Time
1	Jan Raas (NED)	TI–Raleigh	3h 38' 00"
2	Jacques Esclassan (FRA)	Peugeot–Esso	s.t.
3	Sean Kelly (IRL)	Splendor	s.t.
4	Marc Demeyer (BEL)	Flandria–Ça va seul	s.t.
5	Bernard Hinault (FRA)	Renault–Gitane	s.t.
6	Guido Van Calster (BEL)	Daf Trucks	s.t.
7	William Tackaert (BEL)	Daf Trucks	s.t.
8	Rudy Pevenage (BEL)	IJsboerke–Warncke	s.t.
9	Dietrich Thurau (FRG)	IJsboerke–Warncke	s.t.
10	Jos Jacobs (BEL)	IJsboerke–Warncke	s.t.

General classification after stage 5

Rank	Rider	Team	Time
1	Bernard Hinault (FRA)	Renault–Gitane	18h 18' 14"
2	Joop Zoetemelk (NED)	Miko–Mercier	+ 12"
3	Hennie Kuiper (NED)	Peugeot–Esso	+ 31"
4	Joaquim Agostinho (POR)	Flandria–Ça va seul	+ 1' 24"
5	Sven-Åke Nilsson (SWE)	Miko–Mercier	+ 1' 34"
6	Ueli Sutter (SUI)	TI–Raleigh	+ 2' 28"
7	Gery Verlinden (BEL)	IJsboerke–Warncke	+ 4' 16"
8	Jean-René Bernaudeau (FRA)	Renault–Gitane	+ 4' 17"
9	Gianbattista Baronchelli (ITA)	Magniflex–Famcucine	+ 4' 52"
10	André Dierickx (BEL)	IJsboerke–Warncke	+ 6' 27"

== Stage 6 ==
3 July 1979 – Angers to Saint-Brieuc, 239 km (149 mi)

Stage 6 result

Rank	Rider	Team	Time
1	Jos Jacobs (BEL)	IJsboerke–Warncke	6h 24' 15"
2	Bernard Hinault (FRA)	Renault–Gitane	+ 1"
3	Jan Raas (NED)	TI–Raleigh	s.t.
4	Sean Kelly (IRL)	Splendor	s.t.
5	Marc Demeyer (BEL)	Flandria–Ça va seul	s.t.
6	Jacques Esclassan (FRA)	Peugeot–Esso	s.t.
7	Gilbert Duclos-Lassalle (FRA)	Peugeot–Esso	s.t.
8	Guido Van Calster (BEL)	Daf Trucks	s.t.
9	Bernard Vallet (FRA)	La Redoute–Motobécane	s.t.
10	Alessandro Pozzi (ITA)	Bianchi–Faema	s.t.

General classification after stage 6

Rank	Rider	Team	Time
1	Bernard Hinault (FRA)	Renault–Gitane	24h 42' 18"
2	Joop Zoetemelk (NED)	Miko–Mercier	+ 24"
3	Hennie Kuiper (NED)	Peugeot–Esso	+ 43"
4	Sven-Åke Nilsson (SWE)	Miko–Mercier	+ 1' 46"
5	Joaquim Agostinho (POR)	Flandria–Ça va seul	+ 2' 22"
6	Ueli Sutter (SUI)	TI–Raleigh	+ 2' 40"
7	Gery Verlinden (BEL)	IJsboerke–Warncke	+ 4' 28"
8	Jean-René Bernaudeau (FRA)	Renault–Gitane	+ 4' 29"
9	Gianbattista Baronchelli (ITA)	Magniflex–Famcucine	+ 5' 04"
10	André Dierickx (BEL)	IJsboerke–Warncke	+ 6' 39"

== Stage 7 ==
4 July 1979 – Saint-Hilaire-du-Harcouët to Deauville, 158 km (98 mi)

Stage 7 result

Rank	Rider	Team	Time
1	Leo van Vliet (NED)	TI–Raleigh	4h 05' 51"
2	Christian Levavasseur (FRA)	Miko–Mercier	s.t.
3	Christian Poirier (FRA)	La Redoute–Motobécane	s.t.
4	Jaak Verbrugge (NED)	Daf Trucks	+ 29"
5	Willy Teirlinck (BEL)	Kas	+ 1' 01"
6	Jean-Louis Gauthier (FRA)	Miko–Mercier	+ 1' 02"
7	Aldo Donadello (ITA)	Bianchi–Faema	+ 1' 31"
8	Johan van der Velde (NED)	TI–Raleigh	+ 1' 32"
9	Jean Chassang (FRA)	Renault–Gitane	s.t.
10	André Chalmel (FRA)	Renault–Gitane	s.t.

General classification after stage 7

Rank	Rider	Team	Time
1	Bernard Hinault (FRA)	Renault–Gitane	28h 52' 21"
2	Joop Zoetemelk (NED)	Miko–Mercier	+ 24"
3	Hennie Kuiper (NED)	Peugeot–Esso	+ 43"
4	Sven-Åke Nilsson (SWE)	Miko–Mercier	+ 1' 46"
5	Joaquim Agostinho (POR)	Flandria–Ça va seul	+ 2' 22"
6	Ueli Sutter (SUI)	TI–Raleigh	+ 2' 40"
7	Gery Verlinden (BEL)	IJsboerke–Warncke	+ 4' 28"
8	Jean-René Bernaudeau (FRA)	Renault–Gitane	+ 4' 29"
9	Gianbattista Baronchelli (ITA)	Magniflex–Famcucine	+ 5' 04"
10	André Dierickx (BEL)	IJsboerke–Warncke	+ 6' 39"

== Stage 8 ==
5 July 1979 – Deauville to Le Havre, 90 km (56 mi) (TTT)

Stage 8 result

Rank	Team	Time
1	TI–Raleigh	1h 50' 27"
2	Renault–Gitane	+ 6"
3	IJsboerke–Warncke	+ 8"
4	Miko–Mercier	+ 1' 00"
5	Flandria–Ça va seul	+ 1' 49"
6	Peugeot–Esso	+ 3' 53"
7	Magniflex–Famcucine	+ 4' 13"
8	Daf Trucks	+ 5' 02"
9	Kas	+ 6' 31"
10	Splendor	+ 6' 32"

General classification after stage 8

Rank	Rider	Team	Time
1	Bernard Hinault (FRA)	Renault–Gitane	30h 42' 54"
2	Joop Zoetemelk (NED)	Miko–Mercier	+ 1' 18"
3	Sven-Åke Nilsson (SWE)	Miko–Mercier	+ 2' 40"
4	Ueli Sutter (SUI)	TI–Raleigh	+ 2' 41"
5	Joaquim Agostinho (POR)	Flandria–Ça va seul	+ 4' 05"
6	Jean-René Bernaudeau (FRA)	Renault–Gitane	+ 4' 29"
7	Hennie Kuiper (NED)	Peugeot–Esso	+ 4' 30"
8	Gery Verlinden (BEL)	IJsboerke–Warncke	s.t.
9	André Dierickx (BEL)	IJsboerke–Warncke	+ 6' 41"
10	Pierre-Raymond Villemiane (FRA)	Renault–Gitane	+ 6' 51"

== Stage 9 ==
6 July 1979 – Amiens to Roubaix, 201 km (125 mi)

Stage 9 result

Rank	Rider	Team	Time
1	Ludo Delcroix (BEL)	IJsboerke–Warncke	4h 49' 03"
2	Dietrich Thurau (FRG)	IJsboerke–Warncke	+ 19"
3	Michel Pollentier (BEL)	Splendor	s.t.
4	André Dierickx (BEL)	IJsboerke–Warncke	s.t.
5	Joop Zoetemelk (NED)	Miko–Mercier	s.t.
6	Christian Poirier (FRA)	La Redoute–Motobécane	+ 3' 40"
7	Willy Teirlinck (BEL)	Kas	+ 3' 45"
8	Alain Meslet (FRA)	Fiat–La France	s.t.
9	Bernard Vallet (FRA)	La Redoute–Motobécane	s.t.
10	Mariano Martínez (FRA)	La Redoute–Motobécane	s.t.

General classification after stage 9

Rank	Rider	Team	Time
1	Joop Zoetemelk (NED)	Miko–Mercier	35h 33' 34"
2	Bernard Hinault (FRA)	Renault–Gitane	+ 2' 08"
3	Sven-Åke Nilsson (SWE)	Miko–Mercier	+ 4' 48"
4	Ueli Sutter (SUI)	TI–Raleigh	+ 4' 49"
5	André Dierickx (BEL)	IJsboerke–Warncke	+ 5' 23"
6	Hennie Kuiper (NED)	Peugeot–Esso	+ 6' 38"
7	Jean-René Bernaudeau (FRA)	Renault–Gitane	+ 9' 21"
8	Gery Verlinden (BEL)	IJsboerke–Warncke	+ 9' 22"
9	Pierre-Raymond Villemiane (FRA)	Renault–Gitane	+ 11' 43"
10	Christian Seznec (FRA)	Miko–Mercier	+ 13' 53"

== Stage 10 ==
7 July 1979 – Roubaix to Brussels, 124 km (77 mi)

Stage 10 result

Rank	Rider	Team	Time
1	Jo Maas (NED)	Daf Trucks	2h 44' 02"
2	Pol Verschuere (BEL)	Flandria–Ça va seul	+ 54"
3	Ludo Peeters (BEL)	IJsboerke–Warncke	s.t.
4	Bernard Bourreau (FRA)	Peugeot–Esso	+ 2' 24"
5	Didier Vanoverschelde (FRA)	La Redoute–Motobécane	s.t.
6	Philippe Tesnière (FRA)	Fiat–La France	+ 9' 03"
7	René Dillen (BEL)	Kas	s.t.
8	Gery Verlinden (BEL)	IJsboerke–Warncke	+ 9' 06"
9	Bernard Vallet (FRA)	La Redoute–Motobécane	+ 9' 32"
10	Willy Teirlinck (BEL)	Kas	+ 9' 33"

General classification after stage 10

Rank	Rider	Team	Time
1	Joop Zoetemelk (NED)	Miko–Mercier	38h 27' 49"
2	Bernard Hinault (FRA)	Renault–Gitane	+ 2' 08"
3	Sven-Åke Nilsson (SWE)	Miko–Mercier	+ 4' 48"
4	Ueli Sutter (SUI)	TI–Raleigh	+ 4' 49"
5	André Dierickx (BEL)	IJsboerke–Warncke	+ 5' 23"
6	Hennie Kuiper (NED)	Peugeot–Esso	+ 6' 38"
7	Jo Maas (NED)	Daf Trucks	+ 8' 19"
8	Gery Verlinden (BEL)	IJsboerke–Warncke	+ 9' 10"
9	Jean-René Bernaudeau (FRA)	Renault–Gitane	+ 9' 21"
10	Pierre-Raymond Villemiane (FRA)	Renault–Gitane	+ 11' 43"

== Stage 11 ==
8 July 1979 – Brussels to Brussels, 33 km (21 mi) (ITT)

Stage 11 result

Rank	Rider	Team	Time
1	Bernard Hinault (FRA)	Renault–Gitane	43' 01"
2	Knut Knudsen (NOR)	Bianchi–Faema	+ 8"
3	Gerrie Knetemann (NED)	TI–Raleigh	+ 26"
4	Dietrich Thurau (FRG)	IJsboerke–Warncke	+ 29"
5	Joop Zoetemelk (NED)	Miko–Mercier	+ 36"
6	Michel Pollentier (BEL)	Splendor	+ 1' 20"
7	Jos Jacobs (BEL)	IJsboerke–Warncke	+ 1' 24"
8	Yves Hézard (FRA)	Peugeot–Esso	+ 1' 28"
9	Gery Verlinden (BEL)	IJsboerke–Warncke	+ 1' 40"
10	Joaquim Agostinho (POR)	Flandria–Ça va seul	+ 1' 48"

General classification after stage 11

Rank	Rider	Team	Time
1	Joop Zoetemelk (NED)	Miko–Mercier	39h 11' 26"
2	Bernard Hinault (FRA)	Renault–Gitane	+ 1' 32"
3	Sven-Åke Nilsson (SWE)	Miko–Mercier	+ 7' 16"
4	Ueli Sutter (SUI)	TI–Raleigh	+ 7' 37"
5	Hennie Kuiper (NED)	Peugeot–Esso	+ 8' 00"
6	André Dierickx (BEL)	IJsboerke–Warncke	+ 8' 43"
7	Jo Maas (NED)	Daf Trucks	+ 10' 38"
8	Gery Verlinden (BEL)	IJsboerke–Warncke	+ 10' 44"
9	Jean-René Bernaudeau (FRA)	Renault–Gitane	+ 12' 56"
10	Pierre-Raymond Villemiane (FRA)	Renault–Gitane	+ 14' 22"

== Stage 12 ==
9 July 1979 – Rochefort to Metz, 193 km (120 mi)

Stage 12 result

Rank	Rider	Team	Time
1	Christian Seznec (FRA)	Miko–Mercier	4h 42' 40"
2	Joseph Borguet (BEL)	Kas	+ 1"
3	Aldo Donadello (ITA)	Bianchi–Faema	+ 23"
4	Bert Pronk (NED)	TI–Raleigh	s.t.
5	Lucien Didier (LUX)	Renault–Gitane	s.t.
6	Hennie Kuiper (NED)	Peugeot–Esso	+ 30"
7	Jos Jacobs (BEL)	IJsboerke–Warncke	+ 2' 15"
8	Marc Demeyer (BEL)	Flandria–Ça va seul	s.t.
9	Sean Kelly (IRL)	Splendor	s.t.
10	Paul Sherwen (GBR)	Fiat–La France	s.t.

General classification after stage 12

Rank	Rider	Team	Time
1	Joop Zoetemelk (NED)	Miko–Mercier	43h 56' 21"
2	Bernard Hinault (FRA)	Renault–Gitane	+ 1' 32"
3	Hennie Kuiper (NED)	Peugeot–Esso	+ 6' 09"
4	Sven-Åke Nilsson (SWE)	Miko–Mercier	+ 7' 16"
5	Ueli Sutter (SUI)	TI–Raleigh	+ 7' 37"
6	André Dierickx (BEL)	IJsboerke–Warncke	+ 8' 43"
7	Gery Verlinden (BEL)	IJsboerke–Warncke	+ 10' 44"
8	Jean-René Bernaudeau (FRA)	Renault–Gitane	+ 12' 56"
9	Christian Seznec (FRA)	Miko–Mercier	+ 13' 13"
10	Pierre-Raymond Villemiane (FRA)	Renault–Gitane	+ 14' 22"
