= 1979 Tour de France, Stage 13 to Stage 24 =

Cycling race stages

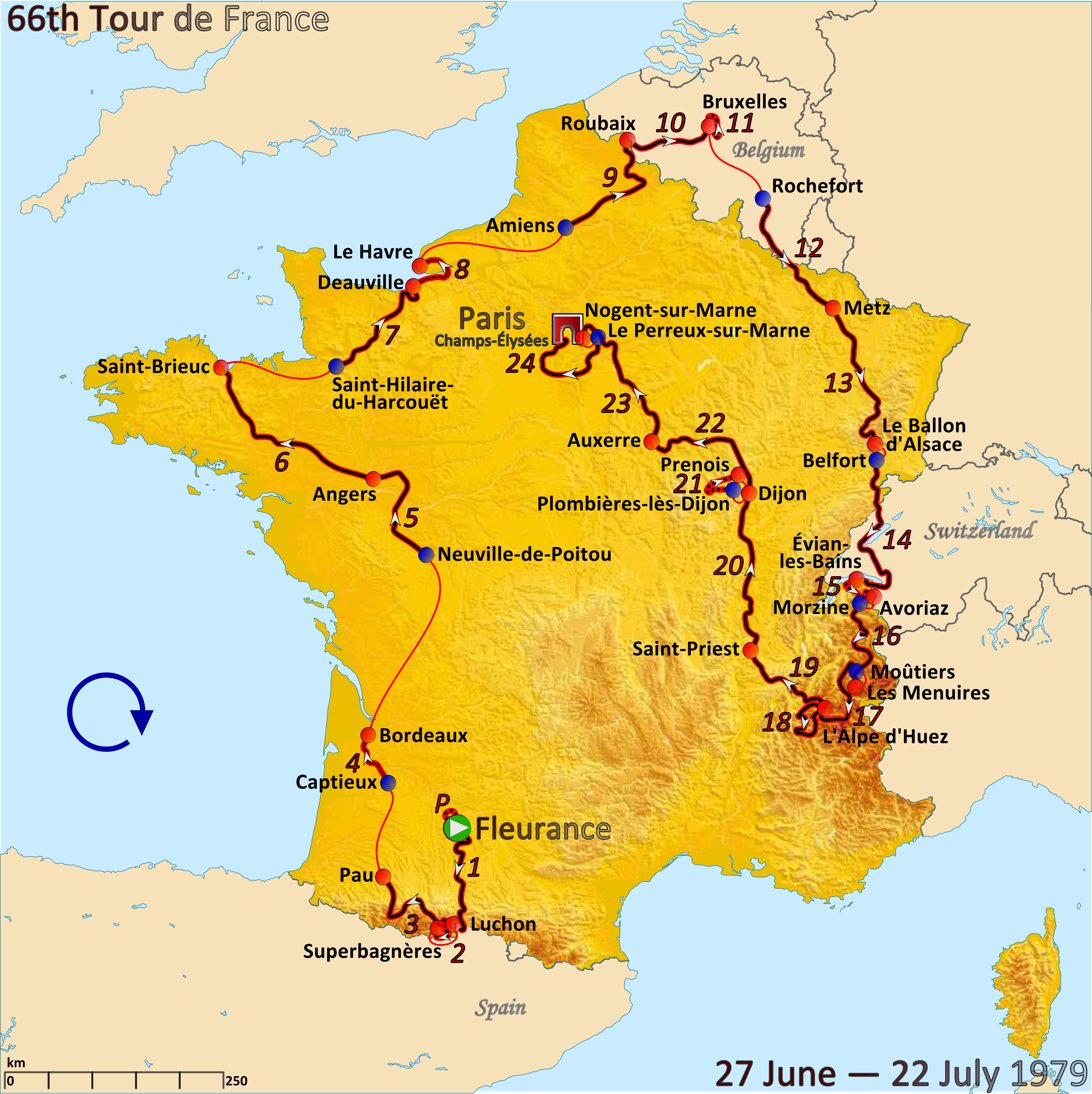
Route of the 1979 Tour de France

The 1979 Tour de France was the 66th edition of the Tour de France, one of cycling's Grand Tours. The Tour began in Fleurance with a prologue individual time trial on 27 June, and Stage 13 occurred on 10 July with a hilly stage from Metz. The race finished in Paris on 22 July.

== Stage 13 ==
10 July 1979 – Metz to Ballon d'Alsace, 202 km (126 mi)

Stage 13 result

Rank	Rider	Team	Time
1	Pierre-Raymond Villemiane (FRA)	Renault–Gitane	4h 56' 23"
2	Rudy Pevenage (BEL)	IJsboerke–Warncke	+ 3"
~~3~~	~~Giovanni Battaglin (ITA)~~	~~Inoxpran~~	~~s.t.~~ (Note: After the end of stage 13, Battaglin was declassified for a positive doping test.)
4	Bernard Vallet (FRA)	La Redoute–Motobécane	+ 7"
5	Francisco Galdós (ESP)	Kas	+ 9"
6	René Bittinger (FRA)	Flandria–Ça va seul	+ 13"
7	René Martens (BEL)	Flandria–Ça va seul	+ 48"
8	Hendrik Devos (BEL)	Flandria–Ça va seul	+ 49"
9	Guido Van Calster (BEL)	Daf Trucks	+ 1' 01"
10	Jean-Louis Gauthier (FRA)	Miko–Mercier	+ 1' 04"

General classification after stage 13

Rank	Rider	Team	Time
1	Joop Zoetemelk (NED)	Miko–Mercier	48h 57' 25"
2	Bernard Hinault (FRA)	Renault–Gitane	+ 1' 29"
3	Hennie Kuiper (NED)	Peugeot–Esso	+ 7' 28"
4	Ueli Sutter (SUI)	TI–Raleigh	+ 7' 50"
5	Sven-Åke Nilsson (SWE)	Miko–Mercier	+ 8' 18"
6	Pierre-Raymond Villemiane (FRA)	Renault–Gitane	+ 9' 41"
7	André Dierickx (BEL)	IJsboerke–Warncke	+ 10' 55"
8	Gery Verlinden (BEL)	IJsboerke–Warncke	+ 10' 57"
9	Jean-René Bernaudeau (FRA)	Renault–Gitane	+ 12' 59"
10	Christian Seznec (FRA)	Miko–Mercier	+ 14' 30"

== Stage 14 ==
11 July 1979 – Belfort to Évian-les-Bains, 248 km (154 mi)

Stage 14 result

Rank	Rider	Team	Time
1	Marc Demeyer (BEL)	Flandria–Ça va seul	6h 45' 10"
2	Sean Kelly (IRL)	Splendor	s.t.
3	Jacques Esclassan (FRA)	Peugeot–Esso	s.t.
4	Dietrich Thurau (FRG)	IJsboerke–Warncke	s.t.
5	Giovanni Mantovani (ITA)	Inoxpran	s.t.
6	Johan van der Velde (NED)	TI–Raleigh	s.t.
7	Jean-Louis Gauthier (FRA)	Miko–Mercier	s.t.
8	Nazzareno Berto (ITA)	Inoxpran	s.t.
9	Paul Sherwen (GBR)	Fiat–La France	s.t.
10	Philippe Tesnière (FRA)	Fiat–La France	s.t.

General classification after stage 14

Rank	Rider	Team	Time
1	Joop Zoetemelk (NED)	Miko–Mercier	55h 42' 15"
2	Bernard Hinault (FRA)	Renault–Gitane	+ 49"
3	Hennie Kuiper (NED)	Peugeot–Esso	+ 7' 48"
4	Ueli Sutter (SUI)	TI–Raleigh	+ 8' 07"
5	Sven-Åke Nilsson (SWE)	Miko–Mercier	+ 8' 38"
6	Pierre-Raymond Villemiane (FRA)	Renault–Gitane	+ 9' 39"
7	Gery Verlinden (BEL)	IJsboerke–Warncke	+ 11' 11"
8	André Dierickx (BEL)	IJsboerke–Warncke	+ 11' 15"
9	Jean-René Bernaudeau (FRA)	Renault–Gitane	+ 13' 19"
10	Christian Seznec (FRA)	Miko–Mercier	+ 14' 50"

== Stage 15 ==
12 July 1979 – Évian-les-Bains to Morzine Avoriaz, 54 km (34 mi) (ITT)

Stage 15 result

Rank	Rider	Team	Time
1	Bernard Hinault (FRA)	Renault–Gitane	1h 33' 35"
2	Joop Zoetemelk (NED)	Miko–Mercier	+ 2' 37"
3	Joaquim Agostinho (POR)	Flandria–Ça va seul	+ 3' 15"
4	Gery Verlinden (BEL)	IJsboerke–Warncke	+ 4' 06"
5	Lucien Van Impe (BEL)	Kas	+ 4' 11"
6	Giovanni Battaglin (ITA)	Inoxpran	+ 4' 39"
7	Hennie Kuiper (NED)	Peugeot–Esso	+ 4' 48"
8	Knut Knudsen (NOR)	Bianchi–Faema	+ 5' 13"
9	Yves Hézard (FRA)	Peugeot–Esso	+ 5' 16"
10	Dietrich Thurau (FRG)	IJsboerke–Warncke	+ 5' 34"

General classification after stage 15

Rank	Rider	Team	Time
1	Bernard Hinault (FRA)	Renault–Gitane	57h 16' 39"
2	Joop Zoetemelk (NED)	Miko–Mercier	+ 1' 48"
3	Hennie Kuiper (NED)	Peugeot–Esso	+ 11' 47"
4	Ueli Sutter (SUI)	TI–Raleigh	+ 13' 00"
5	Sven-Åke Nilsson (SWE)	Miko–Mercier	+ 14' 10"
6	Gery Verlinden (BEL)	IJsboerke–Warncke	+ 14' 28"
7	Pierre-Raymond Villemiane (FRA)	Renault–Gitane	+ 16' 19"
8	Jean-René Bernaudeau (FRA)	Renault–Gitane	+ 18' 20"
9	Giovanni Battaglin (ITA)	Inoxpran	+ 19' 12"
10	André Dierickx (BEL)	IJsboerke–Warncke	+ 20' 24"

== Stage 16 ==
13 July 1979 – Morzine Avoriaz to Les Menuires, 201 km (125 mi)

Stage 16 result

Rank	Rider	Team	Time
1	Lucien Van Impe (BEL)	Kas	6h 05' 16"
2	Bernard Hinault (FRA)	Renault–Gitane	+ 6"
3	Claude Criquielion (BEL)	Kas	+ 16"
4	Johan van der Velde (NED)	TI–Raleigh	+ 32"
5	Giovanni Battaglin (ITA)	Inoxpran	+ 33"
6	Michel Pollentier (BEL)	Splendor	s.t.
7	Jo Maas (NED)	Daf Trucks	+ 44"
8	Robert Alban (FRA)	Fiat–La France	+ 49"
9	Joop Zoetemelk (NED)	Miko–Mercier	+ 1' 03"
10	René Bittinger (FRA)	Flandria–Ça va seul	+ 1' 41"

General classification after stage 16

Rank	Rider	Team	Time
1	Bernard Hinault (FRA)	Renault–Gitane	63h 22' 01"
2	Joop Zoetemelk (NED)	Miko–Mercier	+ 2' 45"
3	Hennie Kuiper (NED)	Peugeot–Esso	+ 14' 23"
4	Ueli Sutter (SUI)	TI–Raleigh	+ 17' 18"
5	Gery Verlinden (BEL)	IJsboerke–Warncke	+ 19' 22"
6	Giovanni Battaglin (ITA)	Inoxpran	+ 19' 45"
7	Jean-René Bernaudeau (FRA)	Renault–Gitane	+ 21' 00"
8	Jo Maas (NED)	Daf Trucks	+ 21' 28"
9	Michel Pollentier (BEL)	Splendor	+ 23' 27"
10	Joaquim Agostinho (POR)	Flandria–Ça va seul	+ 24' 59"

== Rest day ==
14 July 1979 – Les Menuires

== Stage 17 ==
15 July 1979 – Les Menuires to Alpe d'Huez, 167 km (104 mi)

Stage 17 result

Rank	Rider	Team	Time
1	Joaquim Agostinho (POR)	Flandria–Ça va seul	6h 12' 55"
2	Robert Alban (FRA)	Fiat–La France	+ 1' 57"
3	Paul Wellens (BEL)	TI–Raleigh	+ 2' 45"
4	Michel Laurent (FRA)	Peugeot–Esso	+ 2' 48"
5	Jean-René Bernaudeau (FRA)	Renault–Gitane	+ 3' 17"
6	Sven-Åke Nilsson (SWE)	Miko–Mercier	+ 3' 19"
7	Giovanni Battaglin (ITA)	Inoxpran	s.t.
8	Bernard Hinault (FRA)	Renault–Gitane	s.t.
9	Joop Zoetemelk (NED)	Miko–Mercier	s.t.
10	Raymond Martin (FRA)	Miko–Mercier	+ 3' 34"

General classification after stage 17

Rank	Rider	Team	Time
1	Bernard Hinault (FRA)	Renault–Gitane	69h 38' 15"
2	Joop Zoetemelk (NED)	Miko–Mercier	+ 2' 45"
3	Hennie Kuiper (NED)	Peugeot–Esso	+ 19' 22"
4	Jean-René Bernaudeau (FRA)	Renault–Gitane	+ 20' 58"
5	Joaquim Agostinho (POR)	Flandria–Ça va seul	+ 21' 40"
6	Gery Verlinden (BEL)	IJsboerke–Warncke	+ 25' 42"
7	Jo Maas (NED)	Daf Trucks	+ 27' 20"
8	Giovanni Battaglin (ITA)	Inoxpran	+ 29' 45"
9	Paul Wellens (BEL)	TI–Raleigh	+ 30' 52"
10	Claude Criquielion (BEL)	Kas	+ 31' 08"

== Stage 18 ==
16 July 1979 – Alpe d'Huez to Alpe d'Huez, 119 km (74 mi)

Stage 18 result

Rank	Rider	Team	Time
1	Joop Zoetemelk (NED)	Miko–Mercier	4h 23' 28"
2	Lucien Van Impe (BEL)	Kas	+ 40"
3	Bernard Hinault (FRA)	Renault–Gitane	+ 47"
4	Joaquim Agostinho (POR)	Flandria–Ça va seul	+ 1' 05"
5	Giovanni Battaglin (ITA)	Inoxpran	+ 2' 21"
6	Mariano Martínez (FRA)	La Redoute–Motobécane	s.t.
7	Paul Wellens (BEL)	TI–Raleigh	+ 2' 23"
8	Hennie Kuiper (NED)	Peugeot–Esso	+ 2' 48"
9	Jean-René Bernaudeau (FRA)	Renault–Gitane	+ 3' 29"
10	Christian Levavasseur (FRA)	Miko–Mercier	s.t.

General classification after stage 18

Rank	Rider	Team	Time
1	Bernard Hinault (FRA)	Renault–Gitane	74h 02' 30"
2	Joop Zoetemelk (NED)	Miko–Mercier	+ 1' 58"
3	Hennie Kuiper (NED)	Peugeot–Esso	+ 21' 23"
4	Joaquim Agostinho (POR)	Flandria–Ça va seul	+ 21' 58"
5	Jean-René Bernaudeau (FRA)	Renault–Gitane	+ 23' 40"
6	Jo Maas (NED)	Daf Trucks	+ 30' 50"
7	Giovanni Battaglin (ITA)	Inoxpran	+ 31' 19"
8	Paul Wellens (BEL)	TI–Raleigh	+ 32' 28"
9	Claude Criquielion (BEL)	Kas	+ 33' 55"
10	Dietrich Thurau (FRG)	IJsboerke–Warncke	+ 39' 12"

== Stage 19 ==
17 July 1979 – Alpe d'Huez to Saint-Priest, 162 km (101 mi)

Stage 19 result

Rank	Rider	Team	Time
1	Dietrich Thurau (FRG)	IJsboerke–Warncke	4h 48' 40"
2	Jos Jacobs (BEL)	IJsboerke–Warncke	s.t.
3	Marc Demeyer (BEL)	Flandria–Ça va seul	s.t.
4	Bernard Hinault (FRA)	Renault–Gitane	s.t.
5	Stefan Mutter (SUI)	TI–Raleigh	s.t.
6	Guido Van Calster (BEL)	Daf Trucks	s.t.
7	Johan van der Velde (NED)	TI–Raleigh	s.t.
8	Rudy Pevenage (BEL)	IJsboerke–Warncke	s.t.
9	Hennie Kuiper (NED)	Peugeot–Esso	s.t.
10	Jean-Louis Gauthier (FRA)	Miko–Mercier	s.t.

General classification after stage 19

Rank	Rider	Team	Time
1	Bernard Hinault (FRA)	Renault–Gitane	78h 51' 10"
2	Joop Zoetemelk (NED)	Miko–Mercier	+ 1' 58"
3	Hennie Kuiper (NED)	Peugeot–Esso	+ 21' 23"
4	Joaquim Agostinho (POR)	Flandria–Ça va seul	+ 21' 58"
5	Jean-René Bernaudeau (FRA)	Renault–Gitane	+ 23' 40"
6	Jo Maas (NED)	Daf Trucks	+ 30' 50"
7	Giovanni Battaglin (ITA)	Inoxpran	+ 31' 19"
8	Paul Wellens (BEL)	TI–Raleigh	+ 32' 28"
9	Claude Criquielion (BEL)	Kas	+ 33' 55"
10	Dietrich Thurau (FRG)	IJsboerke–Warncke	+ 39' 12"

== Stage 20 ==
18 July 1979 – Saint-Priest to Dijon, 240 km (150 mi)

Stage 20 result

Rank	Rider	Team	Time
1	Serge Parsani (ITA)	Bianchi–Faema	6h 52' 26"
2	Gerrie Knetemann (NED)	TI–Raleigh	+ 8"
3	Lucien Van Impe (BEL)	Kas	+ 17"
4	Jean Chassang (FRA)	Renault–Gitane	+ 29"
5	Bernard Hinault (FRA)	Renault–Gitane	s.t.
6	Willy Teirlinck (BEL)	Kas	+ 31"
7	Marc Demeyer (BEL)	Flandria–Ça va seul	s.t.
8	Jos Jacobs (BEL)	IJsboerke–Warncke	s.t.
9	Hennie Kuiper (NED)	Peugeot–Esso	s.t.
10	Dietrich Thurau (FRG)	IJsboerke–Warncke	s.t.

General classification after stage 20

Rank	Rider	Team	Time
1	Bernard Hinault (FRA)	Renault–Gitane	85h 44' 05"
2	Joop Zoetemelk (NED)	Miko–Mercier	+ 1' 58"
3	Hennie Kuiper (NED)	Peugeot–Esso	+ 21' 20"
4	Joaquim Agostinho (POR)	Flandria–Ça va seul	+ 21' 58"
5	Jean-René Bernaudeau (FRA)	Renault–Gitane	+ 23' 37"
6	Jo Maas (NED)	Daf Trucks	+ 30' 50"
7	Giovanni Battaglin (ITA)	Inoxpran	+ 31' 19"
8	Paul Wellens (BEL)	TI–Raleigh	+ 32' 28"
9	Claude Criquielion (BEL)	Kas	+ 33' 52"
10	Dietrich Thurau (FRG)	IJsboerke–Warncke	+ 38' 46"

== Stage 21 ==
19 July 1979 – Dijon to Dijon, 49 km (30 mi) (ITT)

Stage 21 result

Rank	Rider	Team	Time
1	Bernard Hinault (FRA)	Renault–Gitane	1h 08' 53"
2	Joop Zoetemelk (NED)	Miko–Mercier	+ 1' 09"
3	Gerrie Knetemann (NED)	TI–Raleigh	+ 1' 34"
4	Knut Knudsen (NOR)	Bianchi–Faema	+ 1' 35"
5	Joaquim Agostinho (POR)	Flandria–Ça va seul	+ 2' 37"
6	Dietrich Thurau (FRG)	IJsboerke–Warncke	+ 3' 31"
7	Lucien Van Impe (BEL)	Kas	+ 3' 41"
8	Paul Wellens (BEL)	TI–Raleigh	+ 4' 20"
9	Claude Criquielion (BEL)	Kas	+ 4' 28"
10	René Martens (BEL)	Flandria–Ça va seul	+ 4' 36"

General classification after stage 21

Rank	Rider	Team	Time
1	Bernard Hinault (FRA)	Renault–Gitane	86h 52' 58"
2	Joop Zoetemelk (NED)	Miko–Mercier	+ 3' 07"
3	Joaquim Agostinho (POR)	Flandria–Ça va seul	+ 24' 35"
4	Hennie Kuiper (NED)	Peugeot–Esso	+ 26' 01"
5	Jean-René Bernaudeau (FRA)	Renault–Gitane	+ 30' 25"
6	Jo Maas (NED)	Daf Trucks	+ 36' 21"
7	Paul Wellens (BEL)	TI–Raleigh	+ 36' 48"
8	Giovanni Battaglin (ITA)	Inoxpran	+ 36' 53"
9	Claude Criquielion (BEL)	Kas	+ 38' 20"
10	Dietrich Thurau (FRG)	IJsboerke–Warncke	+ 42' 17"

== Stage 22 ==
20 July 1979 – Dijon to Auxerre, 189 km (117 mi)

Stage 22 result

Rank	Rider	Team	Time
1	Gerrie Knetemann (NED)	TI–Raleigh	5h 32' 22"
2	Giovanni Battaglin (ITA)	Inoxpran	s.t.
3	Marc Demeyer (BEL)	Flandria–Ça va seul	+ 49"
4	Dietrich Thurau (FRG)	IJsboerke–Warncke	s.t.
5	Willy Teirlinck (BEL)	Kas	s.t.
6	Guido Van Calster (BEL)	Daf Trucks	s.t.
7	Jos Jacobs (BEL)	IJsboerke–Warncke	s.t.
8	Paul Sherwen (GBR)	Fiat–La France	s.t.
9	Didier Vanoverschelde (FRA)	La Redoute–Motobécane	s.t.
10	Sean Kelly (IRL)	Splendor	s.t.

General classification after stage 22

Rank	Rider	Team	Time
1	Bernard Hinault (FRA)	Renault–Gitane	92h 26' 09"
2	Joop Zoetemelk (NED)	Miko–Mercier	+ 3' 07"
3	Joaquim Agostinho (POR)	Flandria–Ça va seul	+ 24' 35"
4	Hennie Kuiper (NED)	Peugeot–Esso	+ 25' 58"
5	Jean-René Bernaudeau (FRA)	Renault–Gitane	+ 30' 25"
6	Giovanni Battaglin (ITA)	Inoxpran	+ 35' 54"
7	Jo Maas (NED)	Daf Trucks	+ 36' 21"
8	Paul Wellens (BEL)	TI–Raleigh	+ 36' 48"
9	Claude Criquielion (BEL)	Kas	+ 38' 20"
10	Dietrich Thurau (FRG)	IJsboerke–Warncke	+ 42' 17"

== Stage 23 ==
21 July 1979 – Auxerre to Nogent-sur-Marne, 205 km (127 mi)

Stage 23 result

Rank	Rider	Team	Time
1	Bernard Hinault (FRA)	Renault–Gitane	5h 52' 56"
2	Marc Demeyer (BEL)	Flandria–Ça va seul	s.t.
3	Guido Van Calster (BEL)	Daf Trucks	s.t.
4	Dietrich Thurau (FRG)	IJsboerke–Warncke	s.t.
5	Jean Chassang (FRA)	Renault–Gitane	s.t.
6	Johan van der Velde (NED)	TI–Raleigh	s.t.
7	Jean-François Pescheux (FRA)	La Redoute–Motobécane	s.t.
8	Sean Kelly (IRL)	Splendor	s.t.
9	Jos Jacobs (BEL)	IJsboerke–Warncke	s.t.
10	Stefan Mutter (SUI)	TI–Raleigh	s.t.

General classification after stage 23

Rank	Rider	Team	Time
1	Bernard Hinault (FRA)	Renault–Gitane	98h 19' 05"
2	Joop Zoetemelk (NED)	Miko–Mercier	+ 3' 07"
3	Joaquim Agostinho (POR)	Flandria–Ça va seul	+ 24' 35"
4	Hennie Kuiper (NED)	Peugeot–Esso	+ 25' 44"
5	Jean-René Bernaudeau (FRA)	Renault–Gitane	+ 30' 25"
6	Giovanni Battaglin (ITA)	Inoxpran	+ 35' 54"
7	Jo Maas (NED)	Daf Trucks	+ 36' 21"
8	Paul Wellens (BEL)	TI–Raleigh	+ 36' 48"
9	Claude Criquielion (BEL)	Kas	+ 38' 20"
10	Dietrich Thurau (FRG)	IJsboerke–Warncke	+ 42' 17"

== Stage 24 ==
22 July 1979 – Le Perreux-sur-Marne to Paris Champs-Élysées, 180 km (110 mi)

Stage 24 result

Rank	Rider	Team	Time
1	Bernard Hinault (FRA)	Renault–Gitane	4h 47' 45"
~~2~~	~~Joop Zoetemelk (NED)~~	~~Miko–Mercier~~	~~s.t.~~ (Note: After the end of the final stage, Zoetemelk was declassified for a positive doping test and penalised ten minutes on the general classification.)
3	Dietrich Thurau (FRG)	IJsboerke–Warncke	+ 2' 18"
4	Jacques Bossis (FRA)	Peugeot–Esso	s.t.
5	Paul Sherwen (GBR)	Fiat–La France	s.t.
6	Sean Kelly (IRL)	Splendor	s.t.
7	Didier Vanoverschelde (FRA)	La Redoute–Motobécane	s.t.
8	Gerrie Knetemann (NED)	TI–Raleigh	s.t.
9	Dominique Sanders (FRA)	Teka	s.t.
10	Jean-Louis Gauthier (FRA)	Miko–Mercier	s.t.

General classification after stage 24

Rank	Rider	Team	Time
1	Bernard Hinault (FRA)	Renault–Gitane	103h 06' 50"
2	Joop Zoetemelk (NED)	Miko–Mercier	+ 13' 07"
3	Joaquim Agostinho (POR)	Flandria–Ça va seul	+ 26' 53"
4	Hennie Kuiper (NED)	Peugeot–Esso	+ 28' 02"
5	Jean-René Bernaudeau (FRA)	Renault–Gitane	+ 32' 43"
6	Giovanni Battaglin (ITA)	Inoxpran	+ 38' 12"
7	Jo Maas (NED)	Daf Trucks	+ 38' 38"
8	Paul Wellens (BEL)	TI–Raleigh	+ 39' 06"
9	Claude Criquielion (BEL)	Kas	+ 40' 38"
10	Dietrich Thurau (FRG)	IJsboerke–Warncke	+ 44' 35"
