= Champs-Élysées stage in the Tour de France =

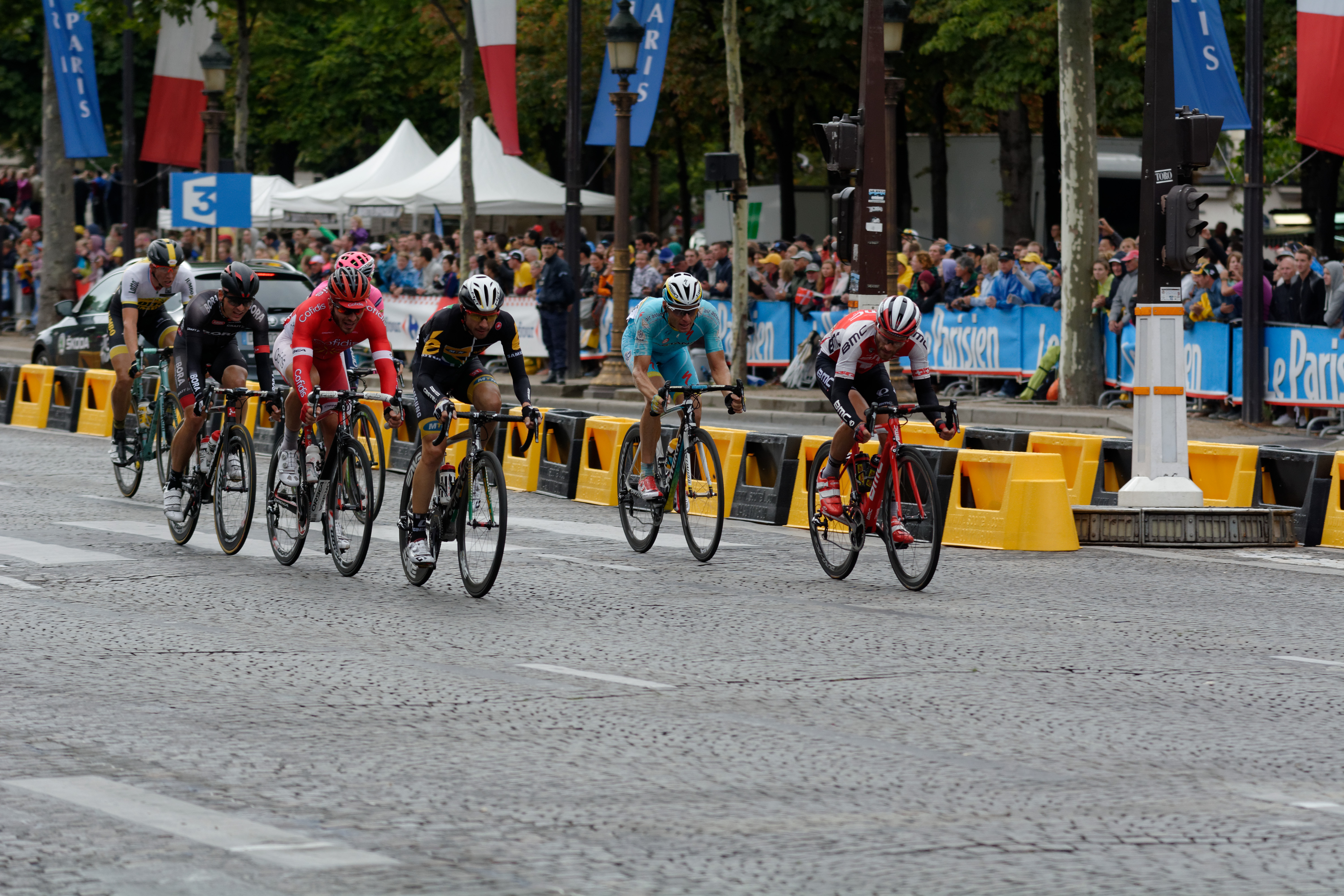
- Final stage on the Champs-Élysées in 2015
- Venue: Champs-Élysées
- Location: Paris, France
- Also known as: Final stage of the Tour de France
- Type: Cycling stage race
- Organised by: Amaury Sport Organisation
- Inaugural winner: Walter Godefroot (1975)
- Won most times: Mark Cavendish (4)
- Route: Enter Paris then, six-to-eight times: Rue de Rivoli; Place de la Concorde; Up the Champs-Élysées; Around the Arc de Triomphe; Down the Champs-Élysées; les Tuileries and the Louvre; Place de la Concorde; Up the Champs-Élysées
- The Champs-Élysées lap is 6.8km (4.1mi) in length

Every year since 1975, with the exception of 2024, the final stage of the Tour de France has concluded on the Champs-Élysées in Paris. As the final stage of one of the most recognised bike race in the world, many riders consider winning the stage as prestigious.

The stage typically starts on the outskirts of Paris, and teams agree on a truce for the opening portion of the race, with cyclists taking the opportunity to have a moment of tranquility, laughing, and celebrating the achievement of finishing the Tour de France. The rider leading the general classification – whose lead is by custom not contested on the final stage, though usually it is by that point unassailable – poses for photographs, often taking a glass of champagne on the way.

The second part of the race is more hotly contested. This consists of between six and ten laps of a circuit of the Champs-Élysées, a wide partly-cobblestoned road. Riders try to break away from the peloton to secure victory, though as of 2025 such attempts have only resulted in a victory on seven occasions (and on only four since 1979). On the other occasions (except 1989, when the final stage was a time-trial), the winner has come from a mass sprint and has therefore typically been a specialist sprinter. At times this means that the final stage has settled the points classification, which is usually won by a sprinter.

Between 2014 and 2016, the course was also used for La Course by Le Tour de France, a women's one-day race. The first edition of Tour de France Femmes in 2022 also used the course, as the first stage of the race.

== History ==
In the first Tour of 1903, the finish was at Ville-d'Avray. From 1904 to 1967 it was at the Parc des Princes track and from 1968 to 1974, during the heyday of Eddy Merckx, at the Vélodrome de Vincennes.

In 1974, Félix Lévitan, co-director of the Tour, and reporter Yves Mourousi suggested a finish on the Champs-Élysées. Mourousi directly contacted French President Valéry Giscard d'Estaing to obtain permission. The first stage took place in 1975: this was a Paris-Paris stage of 25 laps (163.5 kilometres (101.6 mi)). The Belgian Walter Godefroot won the sprint and Bernard Thévenet received the yellow jersey from the hands of Valéry Giscard d'Estaing. In 1977, French Alain Meslet became the first rider to win alone.

Since 1978, the final stage has generally started from outside the city, with only the final part of the stage following the core route. The number of laps has varied between six and ten. Major innovations have generally been avoided, with the notable exception of the 1989 stage which operated as a time-trial.

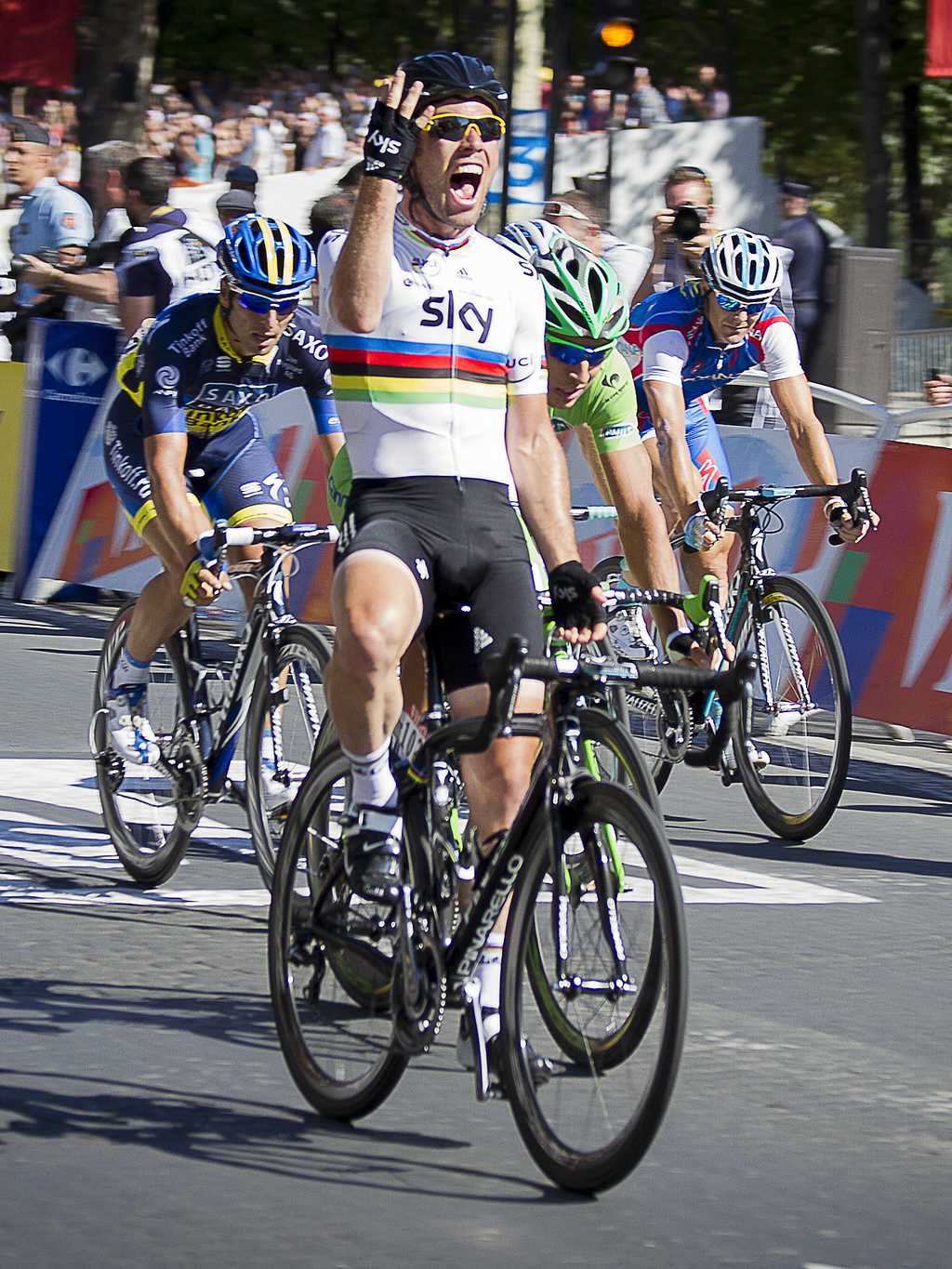
Mark Cavendish on the final stage of the 2012 Tour, the only time a reigning road world champion won on Champs-Élysées

In 2013, in celebration of the 100th Tour de France the stage was shifted to a late afternoon start, finishing in the evening. The course also entered the Champs Elysées via the courtyards of the Louvre Palace, passing directly by the Louvre Pyramid, and utilising the traffic circle around the Arc de Triomphe rather than making a u-turn short of it; these changes have been retained in subsequent years. In 2015, bad weather caused the Tour organisers to declare the overall classification neutralised upon entry to the Champs-Élysées, 70 kilometres (43 mi) before the stage finished.

The course was also used for the first three editions of La Course by Le Tour de France, a women's one-day race held between 2014 and 2021. In these years the race was held in a kermesse-style circuit racing format. The first edition of Tour de France Femmes in 2022 used the course as the first stage of an 8-day race.

=== Montmartre ===
Due to Paris hosting the 2024 Summer Olympics and Paralympics, the 2024 Tour de France finished in Nice instead of in Paris, making it the first time since 1974 that the race has not finished on the Champs-Élysées. In 2025, the race returned to finish on the Champs-Élysées for the 50th time, but with an unusual route involving three climbs of Montmartre. The climbs on this route, intended to celebrate the 50th anniversary of the use of the Champs-Élysées in the Tour and capitalize on the popularity of the use of Montmartre in the 2024 Olympics cycling road race, made the stage less suitable for sprinters. Some riders criticised the change: Remco Evenepoel stated that he did not like the idea; Wout van Aert, who would go on to win the stage, called it "dangerous"; and Jasper Philipsen said it was "a shame to see this stage change". Amaury Sport Organization, the organizers of the Tour, stated that the final stage in Montmartre "exceeded our expectations" and that the stage would likely return in future editions of the Tour. A peak of 8.7 million viewers watched the final stage in 2025, the highest French viewing figures for the Tour in 20 years.

In October 2025, it was announced that the Montmartre stage would return for the 2026 edition – albeit with a larger distance between the finish of the final climb of the Sacré-Cœur and the finish line on the Champs-Élysées.

== Arrivals ==
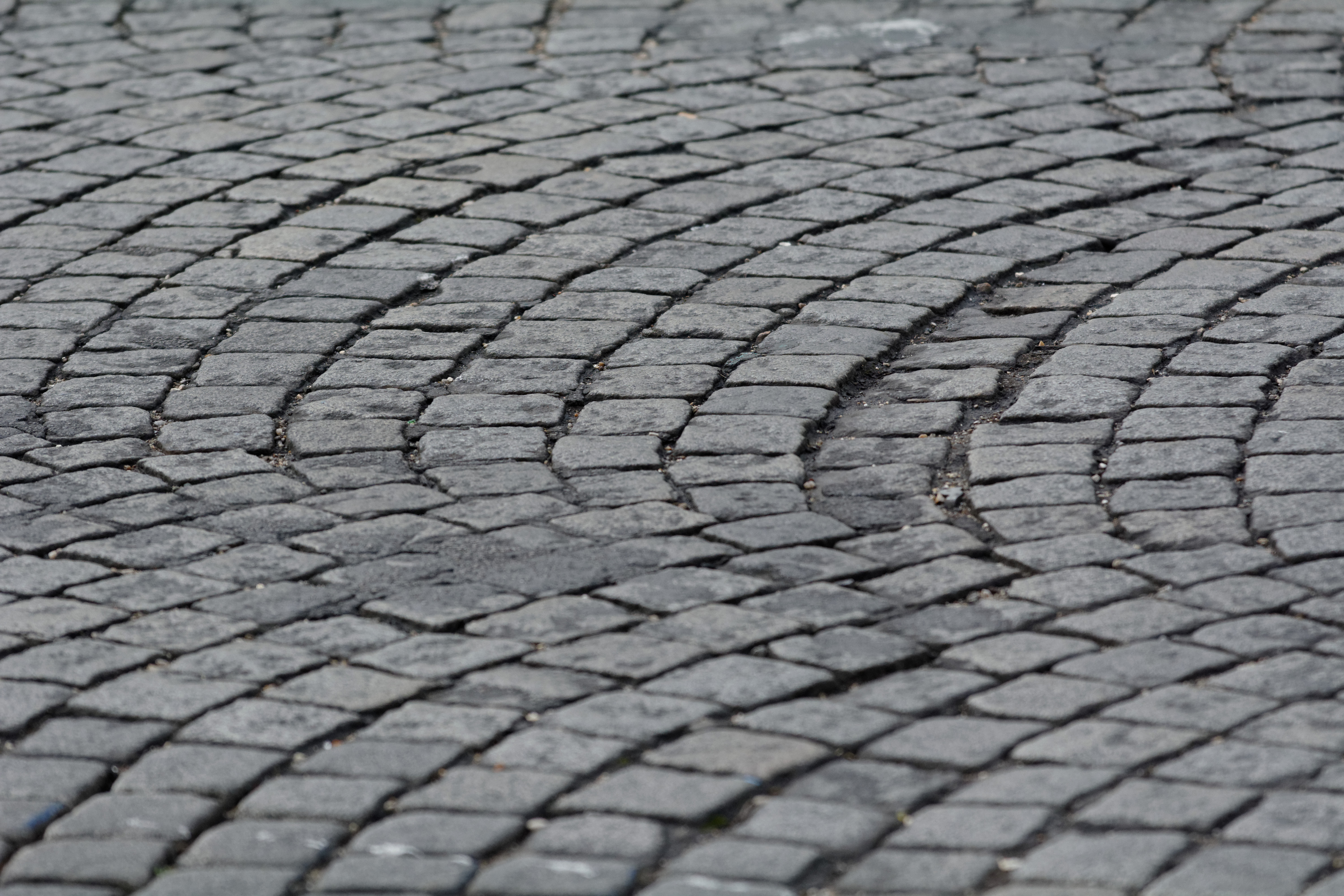
Cobblestones in parts of the Champs-Élysées final stage, photographed in the 2015 Tour

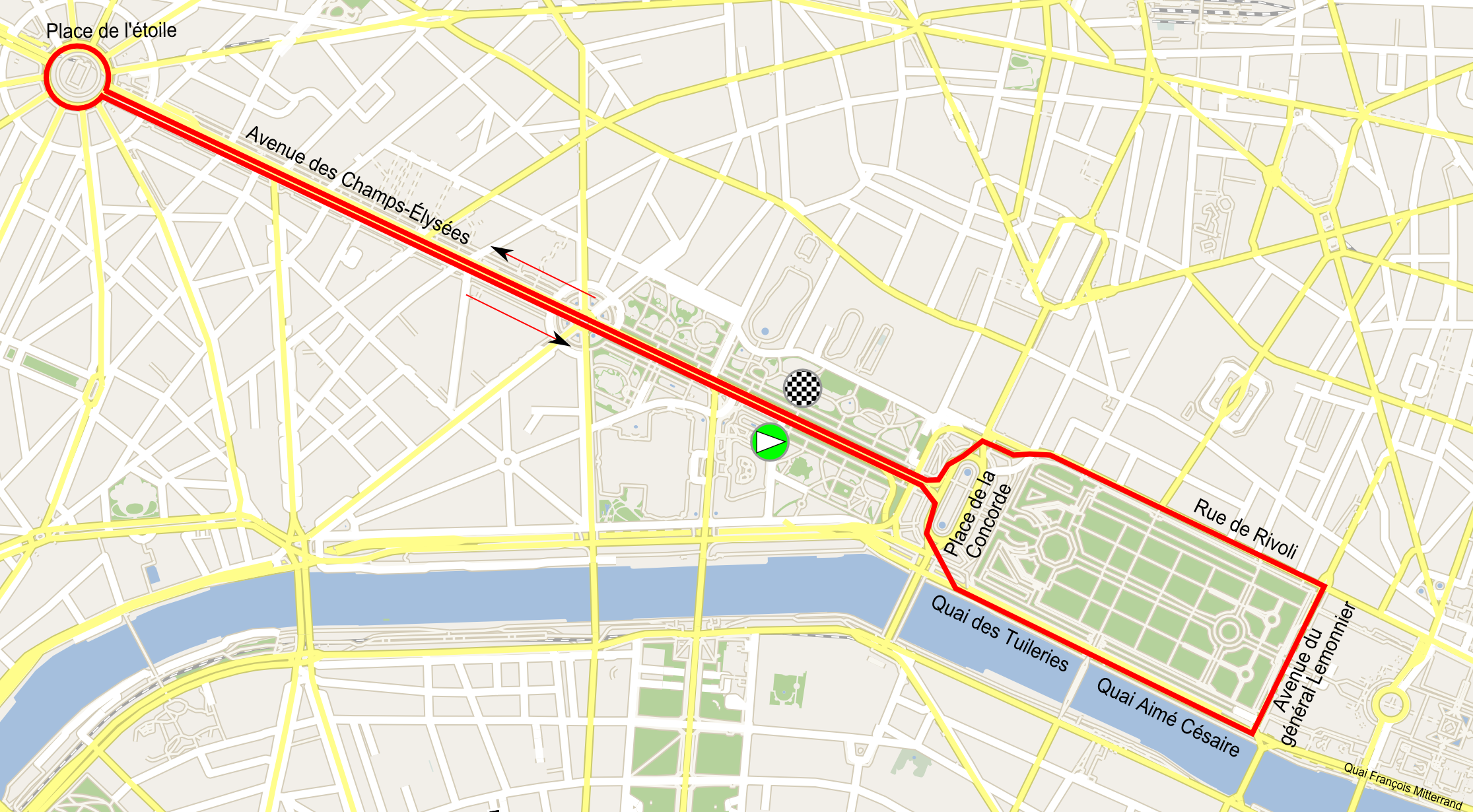
Map of the circuit used between 2013 and 2023 (with the Arc de Triomphe inside the circuit). Before 2013 the riders turned back before the Arc de Triomphe.

Due to the high profile of the last day as well as its setting, the stage is prestigious. The overall Tour placings are typically settled before the final stage, so the racing is often for the glory of finishing the Tour and, at times, to settle the points classification. The leader of the Tour de France is, by convention, not challenged for their lead on this final day. Traditionally, the stage starts with champagne served by the race leader's team, on-the-road photo opportunities and joking around.

As the riders approach Paris, the racing heats up as the sprinters and their teams begin the real racing of the day. When the riders reach central Paris, they enter the Champs-Élysées riding up the Rue de Rivoli, on to the Place de la Concorde and then swing right on to the Champs-Élysées itself. The riders ride now a total of eight laps (including around the Arc de Triomphe, down the Champs-Élysées, round les Tuileries and the Louvre and across the Place de la Concorde back to the Champs-Élysées). In past Tours, the riders would complete ten laps before the Tour was over.

When a rider has reached a significant milestone over the course of the concluding Tour, it is customary for the peloton to let him enter the Champs-Elysées section of the stage in first place. Such an honor was bestowed upon American George Hincapie in 2012, in recognition of his final and record setting 17th Tour de France.

While a number of riders will try to pull away from the peloton on the Champs-Elysées, chances of success are slim and these attempts are often seen as one last opportunity for teams to showcase their colors. It is extremely hard for a small group to resist the push of chasing sprinter's teams on the stage's flat circuit, even more so than in a linear race, and the overwhelming majority have ended in a mass sprint.

In early years, breakaway wins did not appear uncommon. A surprising three straight occurred between 1977 and 1979. However, with the advent of modern racing tactics, the feat has become very rare, lending an increasingly valued place in Tour lore to the few who have achieved it. Those are Frenchmen Alain Meslet (1977), Bernard Hinault (1979) and Eddy Seigneur (1994), Dutchman Gerrie Knetemann (1978), American Jeff Pierce (1987), and Kazakhstani Alexander Vinokourov (2005). Belgian Wout van Aert won from a breakaway on the Champs-Élysées in 2025, in which the stage had a hillier parcours than usual.

== General classification ==
Although generally uncontested, there have been two occasions on which the last stage saw attacks on the leading position in the general classification. In 1979, Joop Zoetemelk was 3:07 behind Bernard Hinault before the final stage. Zoetemelk attacked on the last stage, hoping to win enough time to claim the victory. Hinault chased Zoetemelk, and beat him for the stage victory.

Bernard Hinault in 1979 and in 1982 was the only rider winning on Champs-Élysées in yellow jersey (LeMond in 1989 won the jersey after the stage but didn't wear it during the stage).

In 1989, Greg LeMond beat Laurent Fignon by 58 seconds over a 24 km time trial from Versailles. In doing so, he closed a 50-second gap to win the 1989 Tour de France by eight seconds. It was the first (and only) time trial final stage on the Champs-Élysées and the only time that the yellow jersey change in the Champs-Élysées stage. The 1964, 1965 and 1967 Tours finished with time trials to the Parc des Princes, and the 1968 to 1971 stages had time trials to the Vélodrome de Vincennes (Cipale).

In 2005, Lance Armstrong had a comfortable lead in the general classification, but behind him Alexander Vinokourov and Levi Leipheimer were only two seconds apart, on fifth and sixth place. Vinokourov succeeded in a breakaway during the last kilometre and, because of his stage win and bonus seconds, overtook Leipheimer for fifth position overall.

== Points classification ==
While points classification is mainly associated to a top sprinter competition, the jersey wearer is generally unlucky on Champs-Élysées. The three riders with most green jerseys, Peter Sagan, Erik Zabel and Sean Kelly, never won on Champs-Élysées. Only six times the green jersey wearer won: Freddy Maertens in 1976 first semi-stage and in 1981, Djamolidine Abdoujaparov in 1993, Robbie McEwen in 2002, Mark Cavendish in 2011 and Sam Bennett in 2020. In 1979, Bernard Hinault led the points classification when he won on Champs-Élysées but he did it wearing the yellow jersey. In some years, the points classification was decided on that last stage.

In 1984, Frank Hoste had been leading the points classification for most of the race, but Sean Kelly had taken over the lead on the penultimate stage, with a difference of 4 points. Hoste ended third in the last stage against Kelly fifth, which made Hoste the winner by 4 points.

In the final stages of the 1987 Tour de France, the lead in the points classification switched between Jean-Paul van Poppel and Stephen Roche. Before the final stage, Roche was leading by 17 points, but during the last stage Van Poppel won back 16 points by intermediate sprints. Van Poppel's ninth place in the stage was then enough to win the points classification by 16 points.

In 1991, Djamolidine Abdoujaparov clipped his wheels on barriers. With less than 100m left he tumbled head-over-heels in a spectacular crash. After he regained consciousness, he was helped across the line to clinch the sprinters' competition.

In 2001, Stuart O'Grady had been leading the points classification for most of the race, but Erik Zabel overtook him at the final moment.

In 2003, the green jersey was settled by a close finish between Baden Cooke and Robbie McEwen finishing 2nd and 3rd respectively, that resulted in Cooke finished with 216 points to McEwen's 214.

== Winners ==
Winner of the Champs-Élysées stages in the Tour de France
Year	Date	Stage	Starting place	Distance		Stage winner	Ref
Year	Date	Stage	Starting place	km	mi	Stage winner	Ref
1975	20 July	Stage 22	Paris	163.4	102	Walter Godefroot (BEL)	
1976 (Note: last stage was divided in two half-stages)	18 July	Stage 22a (ITT)	Paris	6	4	Freddy Maertens (BEL)	
1976	18 July	Stage 22b	Paris	90.7	56	Gerben Karstens (NED)	
1977	24 July	Stage 22a (ITT)	Paris	6	4	Dietrich Thurau (GER)	
1977	24 July	Stage 22b	Paris	90.7	56	Alain Meslet (FRA)	
1978	23 July	Stage 22	Saint-Germain-en-Laye	161.5	100	Gerrie Knetemann (NED)	
1979	22 July	Stage 24	Le Perreux-sur-Marne	180.3	112	Bernard Hinault (FRA)	
1980	20 July	Stage 22	Fontenay-sous-Bois	186.1	116	Pol Verschuere (BEL)	
1981	19 July	Stage 22	Fontenay-sous-Bois	186.6	116	Freddy Maertens (BEL)	
1982	25 July	Stage 21	Fontenay-sous-Bois	186.8	116	Bernard Hinault (FRA)	
1983	24 July	Stage 22	Alfortville	195	121	Gilbert Glaus (SUI)	
1984	22 July	Stage 23	Pantin	196.5	122	Eric Vanderaerden (BEL)	
1985	21 July	Stage 22	Orléans	196	122	Rudy Matthijs (BEL)	
1986	27 July	Stage 23	Cosne-sur-Loire	255	158	Guido Bontempi (ITA)	
1987	26 July	Stage 25	Créteil	192	119	Jeff Pierce (USA)	
1988	24 July	Stage 22	Nemours	172.5	107	Jean-Paul van Poppel (NED)	
1989	23 July	Stage 21 (ITT)	Versailles	24.5	15	Greg LeMond (USA)	
1990	22 July	Stage 21	Brétigny-sur-Orge	182	113	Johan Museeuw (BEL)	
1991	28 July	Stage 22	Melun	178	111	Dimitri Konyshev (URS)	
1992	26 July	Stage 21	La Défense	141	88	Olaf Ludwig (GER)	
1993	25 July	Stage 20	Viry-Châtillon	196.5	122	Djamolidine Abdoujaparov (UZB)	
1994	24 July	Stage 21	Disneyland	175	109	Eddy Seigneur (FRA)	
1995	23 July	Stage 20	Sainte-Geneviève-des-Bois	155	96	Djamolidine Abdoujaparov (UZB)	
1996	21 July	Stage 21	Palaiseau	147.5	92	Fabio Baldato (ITA)	
1997	27 July	Stage 21	Disneyland	149.5	93	Nicola Minali (ITA)	
1998	2 August	Stage 21	Melun	147.5	92	Tom Steels (BEL)	
1999	25 July	Stage 20	Arpajon	143.5	89	Robbie McEwen (AUS)	
2000	23 July	Stage 21	Paris	138	86	Stefano Zanini (ITA)	
2001	29 July	Stage 20	Corbeil-Essonnes	160.5	100	Ján Svorada (CZE)	
2002	28 July	Stage 20	Melun	144	89	Robbie McEwen (AUS)	
2003	27 July	Stage 20	Ville-d'Avray	160	99	Jean-Patrick Nazon (FRA)	
2004	25 July	Stage 20	Montereau	163	101	Tom Boonen (BEL)	
2005	24 July	Stage 21	Corbeil-Essonnes	144.5	90	Alexander Vinokourov (KAZ)	
2006	23 July	Stage 20	Antony–Parc de Sceaux	152	94	Thor Hushovd (NOR)	
2007	29 July	Stage 20	Marcoussis	130	81	Daniele Bennati (ITA)	
2008	27 July	Stage 21	Étampes	143	89	Gert Steegmans (BEL)	
2009	26 July	Stage 21	Montereau-Fault-Yonne	160	99	Mark Cavendish (GBR)	
2010	25 July	Stage 20	Longjumeau	102.5	64	Mark Cavendish (GBR)	
2011	24 July	Stage 21	Créteil	95	59	Mark Cavendish (GBR)	
2012	22 July	Stage 20	Rambouillet	120	75	Mark Cavendish (GBR)	
2013	21 July	Stage 21	Versailles	133.5	83	Marcel Kittel (GER)	
2014	27 July	Stage 21	Évry	136	85	Marcel Kittel (GER)	
2015	26 July	Stage 21	Sèvres	109.5	68	André Greipel (GER)	
2016	24 July	Stage 21	Chantilly	113	70	André Greipel (GER)	
2017	23 July	Stage 21	Montgeron	103	64	Dylan Groenewegen (NED)	
2018	29 July	Stage 21	Houilles	116	72	Alexander Kristoff (NOR)	
2019	28 July	Stage 21	Rambouillet	128	80	Caleb Ewan (AUS)	
2020	20 Sept.	Stage 21	Mantes-la-Jolie	122	76	Sam Bennett (IRL)	
2021	18 July	Stage 21	Chatou	108.4	67	Wout van Aert (BEL)	
2022	24 July	Stage 21	Paris La Défense Arena	116	72	Jasper Philipsen (BEL)	
2023	23 July	Stage 21	Saint-Quentin-en-Yvelines	115.1	72	Jordi Meeus (BEL)	
2025	27 July	Stage 21	Mantes-la-Ville	120	75	Wout van Aert (BEL)	
2026	26 July	Stage 21	Thoiry (Note: All pre-stage activities were held in Thoiry, before a bus transfer to Paris, with the stage commencing on the Champs-Élysées.)	88.7	55	Mathieu van der Poel (NED)	

=== Multiple winners ===
The following riders have won the Champs-Élysées stage in the Tour de France on more than one occasion.

Multiple winners of the Champs-Élysées stage
Cyclist	Total	Years
Mark Cavendish (GBR)	4	2009, 2010, 2011, 2012
Freddy Maertens (BEL)	2	1976 (ITT), 1981
Bernard Hinault (FRA)	2	1979, 1982
Djamolidine Abdoujaparov (UZB)	2	1993, 1995
Robbie McEwen (AUS)	2	1999, 2002
Marcel Kittel (GER)	2	2013, 2014
André Greipel (GER)	2	2015, 2016
Wout van Aert (BEL)	2	2021, 2025

=== By nationality ===
Champs-Élysées stage winners by nationality
Country	No. of wins	No. of winning cyclists
Belgium	14	12
Germany	6	4
France	5	4
Italy	5	5
Netherlands	5	5
United Kingdom	4	1
Australia	3	2
United States	2	2
Uzbekistan	2	1
Norway	2	2
Switzerland	1	1
Soviet Union	1	1
Czech Republic	1	1
Kazakhstan	1	1
Ireland	1	1
