= 1979 Tour de France =

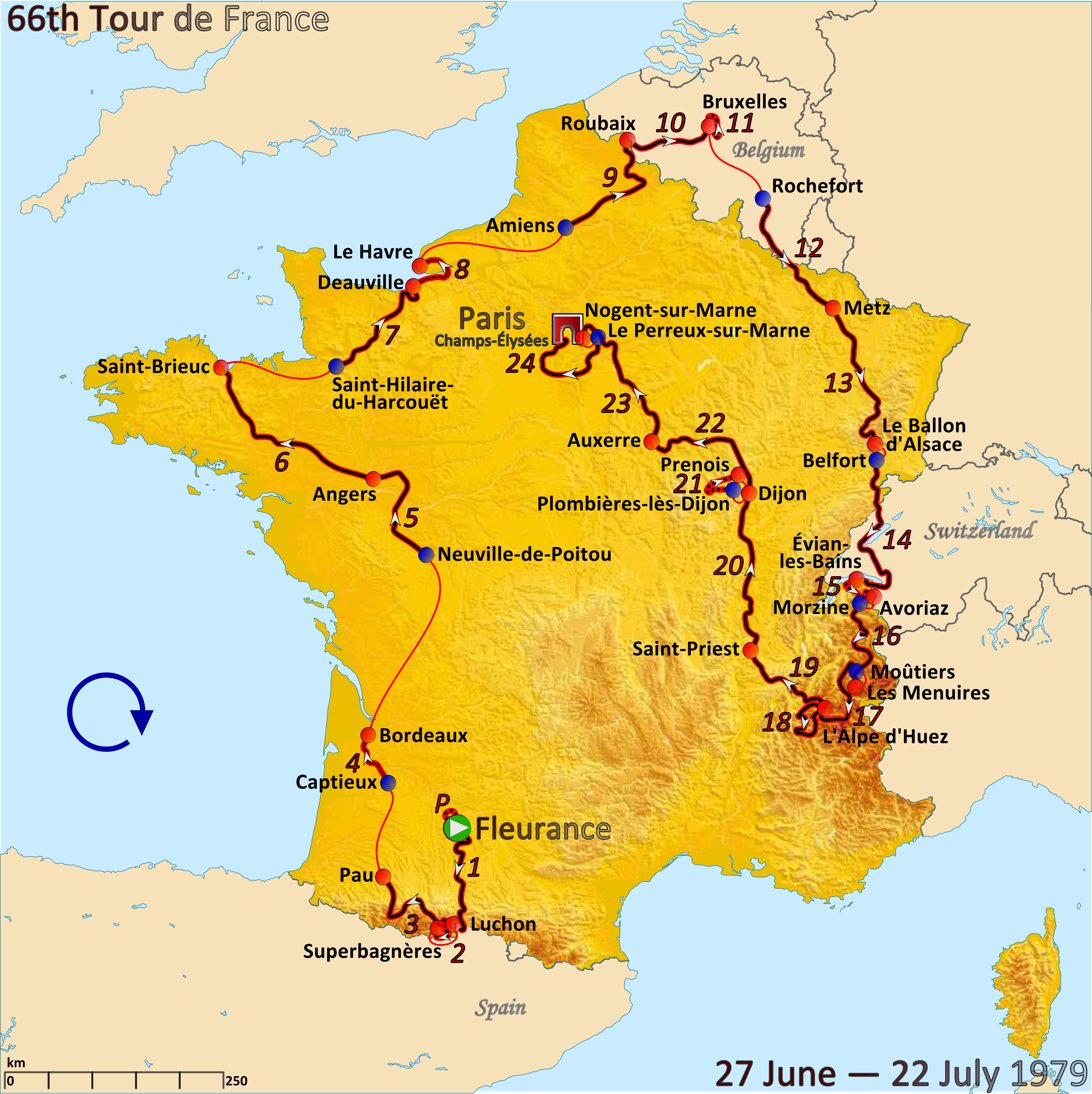
- Route of the 1979 Tour de France

Race details
- Dates: 27 June – 22 July 1979
- Stages: 24 + Prologue
- Distance: 3,765 km (2,339 mi)
- Winning time: 103h 06' 50"

Results
Jersey awarded to the overall winner	Winner	Bernard Hinault (FRA)	(Renault–Gitane)
	Second	Joop Zoetemelk (NED)	(Miko–Mercier–Vivagel)
	Third	Joaquim Agostinho (POR)	(Flandria–Ça va seul)
Jersey awarded to the points classification winner	Points	Bernard Hinault (FRA)	(Renault–Gitane)
Jersey awarded to the mountains classification winner	Mountains	Giovanni Battaglin (ITA)	(Inoxpran)
Jersey awarded to the young rider classification winner	Young rider	Jean-René Bernaudeau (FRA)	(Renault–Gitane)
	Sprints	Willy Teirlinck (BEL)	(Kas–Campagnolo)
	Combativity	Hennie Kuiper (NED)	(TI–Raleigh–McGregor)
	Team	Renault–Gitane	
	Team points	Renault–Gitane	

The 1979 Tour de France was the 66th edition of the Tour de France, one of cycling's Grand Tours. It took place between 27 June and 22 July, with 24 stages covering a distance of 3,765 km (2,339 mi). It was the only tour to finish at Alpe d'Huez twice. It was won by Bernard Hinault, who also won the points classification, and whose team won both team classifications. Remarkably Hinault and second-place finisher Joop Zoetemelk finished nearly a half hour ahead of the other GC Contenders, and in modern history this was the only time the Yellow Jersey was challenged on the ride into Paris. The mountains classification was won by Giovanni Battaglin, and the young rider classification was won by Jean-René Bernaudeau.

== Teams ==
The following 15 teams each sent 10 cyclists, for a total of 150.

The teams entering the race were:

- Renault–Gitane
- Miko–Mercier–Vivagel
- Flandria–Ça va seul
- TI–Raleigh–McGregor
- Kas–Campagnolo
- La Redoute–Motobécane
- Peugeot–Esso–Michelin
- Teka
- Fiat
- IJsboerke–Warncke Eis
- Splendor–Euro Soap
- Bianchi–Faema
- DAF Trucks–Aida
- Inoxpran
- Magniflex–Famcucine

== Pre-race favourites ==
The big favourite was Hinault; not only was he the defending champion, but the large number of time trials made the race especially suited for him. The only cyclist thought to be able to seriously challenge Hinault was Zoetemelk, the runner-up of the previous edition.

== Route and stages ==
The route for the 1979 Tour was revealed in November 1978. It was the shortest course since 1904, but with many climbs it was still considered hard.

Since 1974, the Tour had always been composed of 22 stages, with some of them run as split stages. Following the riders' strike in the 1978 Tour against these split stages, the 1979 Tour included no split stages. To compensate for this, the total number of stages increased to 24. The Tour had one rest day, in Les Menuires. The highest point of elevation in the race was 2,642 m (8,668 ft) at the summit of the Col du Galibier mountain pass on stage 17.

Stage characteristics and winners
Stage	Date	Course	Distance	Type	Winner
P	27 June	Fleurance	5 km (3.1 mi)	Individual time trial	Gerrie Knetemann (NED)
1	28 June	Fleurance to Luchon	225 km (140 mi)	Stage with mountain(s)	René Bittinger (FRA)
2	29 June	Luchon to Superbagnères	24 km (15 mi)	Individual time trial	Bernard Hinault (FRA)
3	30 June	Luchon to Pau	180 km (110 mi)	Stage with mountain(s)	Bernard Hinault (FRA)
4	1 July	Captieux to Bordeaux	87 km (54 mi)	Team time trial	(Netherlands) TI–Raleigh–McGregor
5	2 July	Neuville-de-Poitou to Angers	145 km (90 mi)	Plain stage	Jan Raas (NED)
6	3 July	Angers to Saint-Brieuc	239 km (149 mi)	Plain stage	Jos Jacobs (BEL)
7	4 July	Saint-Hilaire-du-Harcouët to Deauville	158 km (98 mi)	Plain stage	Leo van Vliet (NED)
8	5 July	Deauville to Le Havre	90 km (56 mi)	Team time trial	(Netherlands) TI–Raleigh–McGregor
9	6 July	Amiens to Roubaix	201 km (125 mi)	Plain stage	Ludo Delcroix (BEL)
10	7 July	Roubaix to Brussels (Belgium)	124 km (77 mi)	Plain stage	Jo Maas (NED)
11	8 July	Brussels (Belgium)	33 km (21 mi)	Individual time trial	Bernard Hinault (FRA)
12	9 July	Rochefort (Belgium) to Metz	193 km (120 mi)	Plain stage	Christian Seznec (FRA)
13	10 July	Metz to Ballon d'Alsace	202 km (126 mi)	Hilly stage	Pierre-Raymond Villemiane (FRA)
14	11 July	Belfort to Évian-les-Bains	248 km (154 mi)	Plain stage	Marc Demeyer (BEL)
15	12 July	Évian-les-Bains to Morzine Avoriaz	54 km (34 mi)	Individual time trial	Bernard Hinault (FRA)
16	13 July	Morzine Avoriaz to Les Menuires	201 km (125 mi)	Stage with mountain(s)	Lucien Van Impe (BEL)
	14 July	Les Menuires		Rest day	
17	15 July	Les Menuires to Alpe d'Huez	167 km (104 mi)	Stage with mountain(s)	Joaquim Agostinho (POR)
18	16 July	Alpe d'Huez to Alpe d'Huez	119 km (74 mi)	Stage with mountain(s)	Joop Zoetemelk (NED)
19	17 July	Alpe d'Huez to Saint-Priest	162 km (101 mi)	Plain stage	Dietrich Thurau (FRG)
20	18 July	Saint-Priest to Dijon	240 km (150 mi)	Plain stage	Serge Parsani (ITA)
21	19 July	Dijon	49 km (30 mi)	Individual time trial	Bernard Hinault (FRA)
22	20 July	Dijon to Auxerre	189 km (117 mi)	Plain stage	Gerrie Knetemann (NED)
23	21 July	Auxerre to Nogent-sur-Marne	205 km (127 mi)	Plain stage	Bernard Hinault (FRA)
24	22 July	Le Perreux-sur-Marne to Paris (Champs-Élysées)	180 km (110 mi)	Plain stage	Bernard Hinault (FRA)
	Total		3,765 km (2,339 mi)		

== Race overview ==
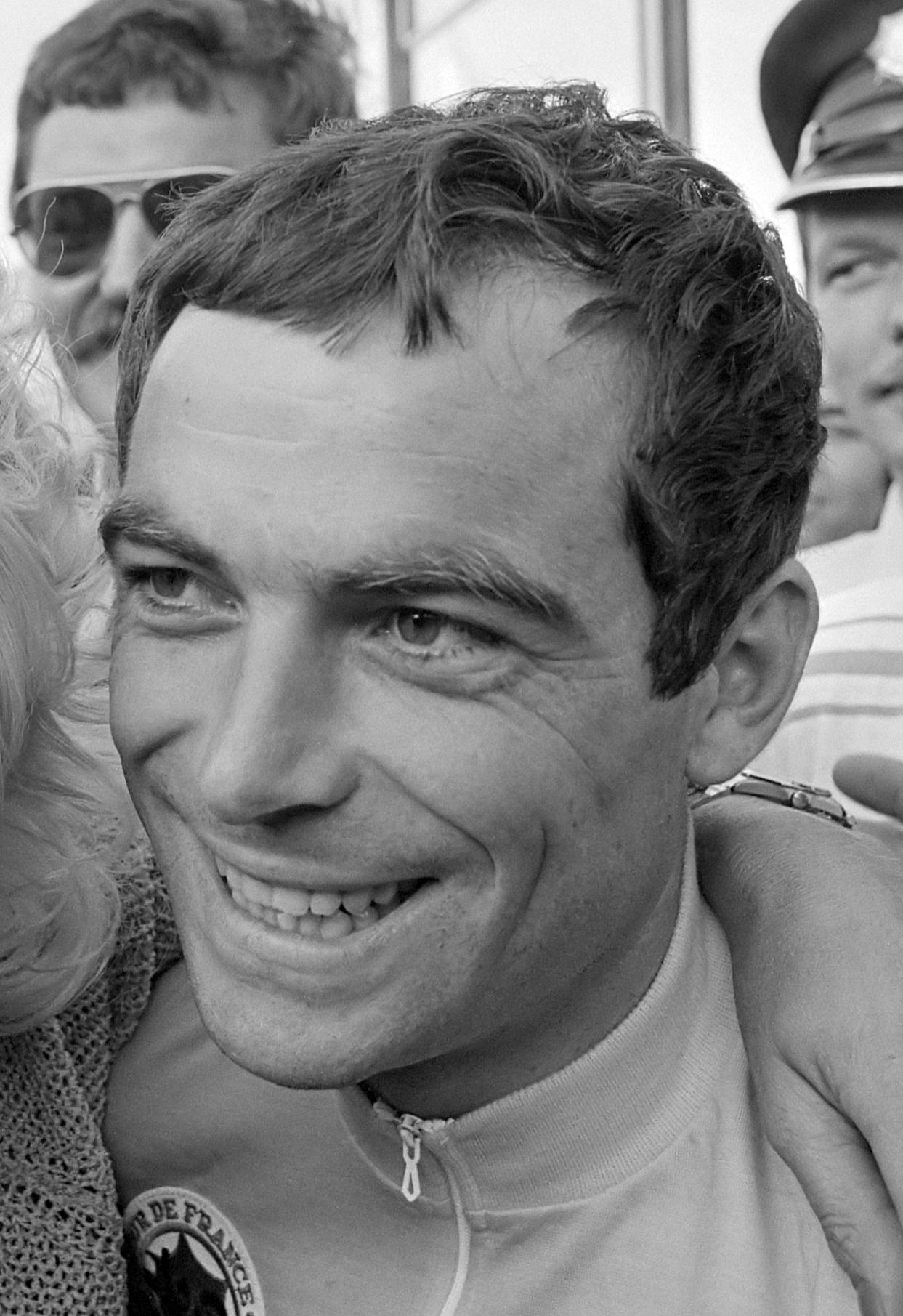
Bernard Hinault (pictured in 1982), winner of the general classification

The prologue was won by Knetemann; Zoetemelk and Hinault both followed at four seconds. The first stage took the riders immediately into the mountains. During stage one Jean-René Bernaudeau and René Bittinger got to the front of the peloton with Bittinger claiming the stage win by eight seconds, and Bernaudeau taking 2nd but moving into the overall race lead. Stage two would be the final stage someone not named Bernard Hinault or Joop Zoetemelk would wear the maillot jaune, which was a mountain climb individual time trial where the top 5 finishers moved into the top 5 in the overall standings. Hinault won the stage and took over the race lead as Zoetemelk moved into 2nd place overall while Joaquim Agostinho, Hennie Kuiper and Sven-Åke Nilsson rounded out the top 5. Stage three ended up as a sprint finish decided amongst the strongest riders who had survived the climbs. Hinault edged Rudy Pevenage at the line but as the strongest riders had finished together there was no change atop the General classification. Stage four was a team time trial won by the consistently dominant TI–Raleigh–McGregor squad with the very strong IJsboerke–Warncke Eis team finishing 2nd. Neither of these teams had a GC rider who was a clear and present threat to Hinault, however the 3rd and 4th place teams in Peugeot–Esso–Michelin and Miko–Mercier–Vivagel did with Kuiper and Zoetemelk. Hinault's Renault–Gitane squad finished in 5th place overall, meaning he lost time to all of these teams and his lead was now only 0:12 over Zoetemelk and 0:31 over Kuiper, who was upset at the missed opportunity following this stage as the team had chosen the wrong tires and punctured numerous times likely costing him the chance to overtake Hinault and Zoetemelk. Agostinho and his Flandria–Ça va seul team finished 6th moving him from a tie for 2nd with Zoetemelk to 4th place overall just 0:10 ahead of Ake-Nilsson. Stage five was a flat stage where Jan Raas outsprinted Jacques Esclassan, the up-and-coming Irishman Sean Kelly, Marc Demeyer and Hinault for the win with no changes among the GC riders. Stage six saw all five out of the five top 5 finishers from the previous day once again competing for the win except this time Joseph Jacobs was able to get ahead of Hinault, Raas, Kelly, Demeyer and Esclassan to win the day by a single second. Hinault's 2nd-place finish added 0:12 to his lead over the riders closest to him in the overall standings. Stage seven came down to a three rider escape involving Christian Levavasseur, Christian Poirier and Leo van Vliet where van Vliet took the stage win as the overall situation remained static.

Stage eight was another team time trial which caused some movement in the standings. TI–Raleigh and Ijsboerke were once again among the strongest teams and were separated by only 0:08 with Raleigh claiming another win. As a result, their highest place rider Ueli Sutter moved into 4th place overall. Ijsboerke finished 3rd behind Hinault's Renault team, who put together a very strong ride finishing in 2nd just 0:06 behind Raleigh. The Miko–Mercier squad of Zoetemelk and Nilsson finished 4th but lost nearly two minutes to Renault meaning Hinault now had some breathing room leading Zoetemelk by 1:18 and the now 3rd place Nilsson by 2:40. The Peugeot–Esso team of Kuiper and the Flandria team of Agostinho fared poorly with Kuiper dropping from 3rd to 7th place at 4:30 behind, whereas Agostinho remained in 5th place, but was now 4:05 back. Stage nine was a pivotal stage that had major ramifications for the top riders who had to contend with the much dreaded cobblestones of Roubaix. Any of the cobbled sections included in the Tour are always treacherous, they result in numerous, if not dozens of minor and occasionally major crashes, many riders get multiple flat tires and depending on the weather it is either intolerably hot and dusty or so muddy that no rider has a clean face by the end of the stage.

This stage was no different and in the end a group of five riders survived to the finish line in the lead group where André Dierickx, Didi Thurau, Michel Pollentier and Zoetemelk crossed the line 0:19 behind Ludo Delcroix. Hinault was actually able to distance himself and gain time on many of the other GC riders and the ones he did not gain time on he stayed even with. Nilsson, Sutter and Kuiper all crossed with the same time as Hinault whereas other top 10 riders going into the stage including Gery Verlinden and Bernaudeau lost time to him. Joaquim Agostinho had a disastrous day in which he lost his 5th place, fell out of the top 10 altogether and was more than 10:00 behind Hinault. By his standards Hinault also had a disastrous day, as he lost the yellow jersey, which he was not happy about as he threatened following the stage that, "there are some riders who will suffer plenty after what happened today", in reference to the select group of riders who got away from him and survived in the breakaway. Of the 5 breakaway survivors Dierickx gained enough time to come within about 3:00 of Hinault but he was not considered a realistic threat. Neither was the stage winner Delcroix and while Thurau or Pollentier might have been threats if they had gaps upwards of ten minutes on Hinault, both of them were still ten minutes or more behind the Badger and therefore irrelevant as far as his pursuit of his 2nd Tour victory was concerned.

As such his anger was seemingly directed primarily at Zoetemelk, who had taken over the lead by 2:08, and was a very real threat to Hinault. In essence the only rider that could beat him, did beat him, and beat him by a considerable margin somehow finding a way to avoid the crashes, the flat tires, the protesters and ‘surviving’ within the winning group of this stage of the Tour which was borrowed from The Hell of the North. Even though Hinault had dropped to 2nd place more than two minutes off the lead, Five time tour champion Jacques Anquetil was pleased with the way Hinault responded following this stage and predicted that Hinault won the Tour, because he had kept his losses limited. In stage ten Jo Maas outlasted his breakaway companions including Pol Verschuere and Ludo Peeters to take the stage win and jump into the top 10 overall as the breakaway had finished close to ten minutes ahead of the peloton. During the stage eleven ITT it became a near certainty that the battle for the 1979 Tour de France would be decided solely between Hinault and Zoetemelk as following this stage the 3rd place rider would be more than 7:00 behind. Hinault won the stage by a narrow margin of just eight seconds over Knut Knudsen but more importantly he cut Zoetemelk's lead from 2:08 down to 1:32.

During stage twelve Christian Seznec beat Joseph Borguet by one second to win the stage as Hennie Kuiper, who started the day in 5th place at 8:00 off the lead joined in the attacks to try to cut into Zoetemelk and Hinault. He managed to win a decent chunk of time back and in the process jumped back into 3rd at +6:09. In stage thirteen however, he would lose back much of the time he gained. Winning the stage three seconds ahead of Rudy Pevenage, was Pierre-Raymond Villemiane who jumped from 10th place up to 6th. Villemiane was a distant threat to the leaders and therefore not pursued by either of their teams, but Hinault did manage to take a three-second bite out of Zoetemelk's lead cutting it down to +1:29. In stage fourteen Zoetemelk added 0:20 to his lead over 3rd place Kuiper, 4th place Sutter and 5th place Nilsson, however Hinault was able to get away from Zoetemelk and win back 0:40 on the Dutchman, cutting his lead to under a minute. Finishing atop the stage podium was Demeyer, followed by Esclassan and Kelly.

Stage 15 was another mountain ITT, which was once again won by Bernard Hinault who put himself back into the yellow jersey. The majority of the ninety-something riders remaining in the race finished well beyond +5:00 of Hinault with only Zoetemelk keeping him under 3:00. Hinault's lead over 5th place Nilsson was just over 14:00, he was 13:00 ahead of 4th place Sutter, nearly 12:00 ahead of 3rd place Kuiper, but only 1:48 ahead of 2nd placed Zoetemelk, a lead he was not satisfied with going into the high mountains of The French Alps. As such Hinault went on the offensive in stage sixteen where he finished just six seconds behind Lucien Van Impe. Van Impe had a rocky start to this Tour but was slowly clawing his way back towards the top 10, even though he was always more concerned with his place within the King of the Mountains competition, not the general classification. More importantly Hinault nearly added another minute to his lead over Zoetemelk, who was now +2:45 behind, as the race headed for back to back hilltop finishes atop Alpe d'Huez following rest day. By the end of stage seventeen the 3rd place rider would be nearly +20:00 behind Hinault, but surprisingly moving all the way back to 5th place was Joaquim Agostinho who put in a masterful performance to win the stage coming all the way back from where his Tour disastrously fell apart back on the cobbles of Roubaix. Meanwhile, Hinault and Zoetemelk crossed the line together some three minutes later with the two of them still separated by +2:45 and only one major mountain stage remaining.

The 2nd hilltop finish at Alpe d'Huez in stage eighteen was the final chance to gain time in the high mountains. The stage was won by Zoetemelk with an advantage of +0:40 over Van Impe. Zoetemelk also managed to drop Hinault near the end of the stage and cut his lead to just under two minutes prior to the final ITT. Continuing on his impressive performance from the day before was Agostinho who finished both in 4th place on the stage, and also climbed up a spot to 4th place in the overall standings, albeit more than twenty minutes behind Hinault. Stage nineteen was won by Didi Thurau who outsprinted Jacobs, Demeyer and Hinault to claim the win. Then during stage 20 Serge Parsani got to the line two seconds slower than the speedy Dutchman Gerrie Knetemann, but Knetemann was given a ten-second penalty for drafting a team car earlier in the stage, which gave Parsani the stage win by eight seconds. The final ITT was in the city of Dijon where Hinault seemingly clinched his 2nd consecutive Tour de France victory building his lead over Zoetemelk to +3:07. The closest rider from within the rest of the field was Agostinho, who jumped into the final podium position but was still nearly twenty-five minutes behind. Stage twenty-two was won in a head-to-head sprint by Gerrie Knetemann over Giovanni Battaglin and in Stage twenty-three Hinault was able to best Demeyer at the finish line.

With the Tour unofficially over and only the ride down the Champs-Élysées remaining stage twenty-four began with the peloton headed towards the finish line in Paris. There were a few escape attempts early in the stage including by Thurau and Zoetemelk, who was trying to get away from Hinault. At 124 kilometres into the stage Hinault left everyone behind and only Zoetemelk went off in pursuit. It took him four kilometres to catch Hinault and by 129 kilometres into the stage this 'royal escape' was turned loose with the teams of both riders controlling the peloton from then on. The time gap between the duo of Hinault and Zoetemelk and the peloton steadily increased from that point on and continued to increase on the laps of the Champs-Élysées. It must certainly have been an unfamiliar sight for the fans in attendance to see the Tour fought over until the last kilometre had been ridden. Hinault crossed the line about a bike length ahead of Zoetemelk and about two and half minutes later the bunch sprint began for 3rd place with Dietrich Thurau edging out Jacques Bossis and Paul Sherwen. Just as the day began with Hinault in the lead by +3:07, it ended with Bernard Hinault as Tour de France champion by +3:07 over Joop Zoetemelk, who had now finished in 2nd place in the Tour de France for a record 5th time, which in and of itself is remarkable considering the ‘Eternal Second’ Raymond Poulidor only finished 2nd three times. Something that did change was the 3rd place rider Agostinho was now nearly a half hour behind. Winning the points classification was Hinault, the mountains classification was won by Giovanni Battaglin, the young rider classification went to Jean-Renè Bernaudeau and the Combativity award was presented to Zoetemelk, who won the award ahead of Battaglin who in addition to winning the KOM competition, also finished 6th and was named the most combative rider on four stages.

Besides the struggle for the first place, there was also a noteworthy struggle for the last place, the lanterne rouge. After the 20th stage, Philippe Tesnière was last in the general classification, with Gerhard Schönbacher before him. Tesnière had already finished last in the 1978 Tour de France, so he was aware of the publicity associated with being the lanterne rouge.

In the 21st stage, Tesnière therefore rode extra slow. Hinault took 1 hour, 8 minutes and 53 seconds to win the time trial, Schönbacher used 1 hour, 21 minutes and 52 seconds, while Tesniere rode it in 1 hour, 23 minutes and 32 seconds; both were slower than all other cyclists. Tesnière's time was more than 20% slower than Hinault's, which meant that he had missed the time cut, and was taken out of the race. When Schönbacher was near the finish of the last stage, he stopped and kissed the road, before he crossed the finishline.

=== Doping ===
For the first time in the Tour de France, doping tests were able to find anabolicals. The doping tests were performed by Manfred Donike in his lab in Cologne.

After the 17th stage, it was announced that Giovanni Battaglin, leader of the mountains classification, had tested positive after the 13th stage. He received a penalty of 10 minutes in the general classification, and lost all mountain points that he collected during that 13th stage, and an extra penalty of 10 points. Frans Van Looy and Gilbert Chaumaz also tested positive for doping.

After the race finished, Joop Zoetemelk was found to have used doping, which he later admitted to. Zoetemelk was fined with 10 minutes in the general classification, and lost his combativity award, but still officially remained in 2nd place by more than ten minutes. His label as an 'eternal second' would permanently be removed the following year.

== Classification leadership and minor prizes ==
There were several classifications in the 1979 Tour de France, four of them awarding jerseys to their leaders. The most important was the general classification, calculated by adding each cyclist's finishing times on each stage. The cyclist with the least accumulated time was the race leader, identified by the yellow jersey; the winner of this classification is considered the winner of the Tour. In previous years, the team time trials only counted for the team classification, and not for the general classification, except for the bonifications. From 1979 on, the team trial also counted for the general classification.

Additionally, there was a points classification, where cyclists got points for finishing among the best in a stage finish, or in intermediate sprints. The cyclist with the most points lead the classification, and was identified with a green jersey.

There was also a mountains classification. The organisation had categorised some climbs as either hors catégorie, first, second, third, or fourth-category; points for this classification were won by the first cyclists that reached the top of these climbs first, with more points available for the higher-categorised climbs. The cyclist with the most points lead the classification, and wore a white jersey with red polka dots.

Another classification was the young rider classification, decided the same way as the general classification. Since 1975, the young rider classification had been contested by neo-professionals: cyclists aged 23 years or younger, or in their first two years as a professional cyclist. This changed in 1979: it was open for cyclists aged 24 or younger at 1 January. The leader wore a white jersey.

The fifth individual classification was the intermediate sprints classification. This classification had similar rules as the points classification, but only points were awarded on intermediate sprints. In 1979, this classification had no associated jersey. In stages 6, 12, 14, 20, 22 and 23, there was a new system for time bonuses. In the intermediate sprints in these stages, the first three cyclists received time bonuses of 10, 6 and 3 seconds; a classification of these time bonuses was made on each of these stages, and the first three of this classification received extra time bonuses of 20, 10 and 5 seconds.

The team classification in 1977 was calculated with the times of the five best cyclists per team, but was in 1978 changed to the best four cyclists. The leading team was the team with the lowest total time. The riders in the team that led this classification were identified by yellow caps. There was also a team points classification. Cyclists received points according to their finishing position on each stage, with the first rider receiving one point. The first three finishers of each team had their points combined, and the team with the fewest points led the classification. The riders of the team leading this classification wore green caps. Inoxpran, Teka, Magniflex and Splendor–Euro Soap did not finish the race with four or more cyclists, so they were not eligible for the team classification. Magniflex and Splendor–Euro Soap did not finish the race with three or more cyclists, so they were not eligible for the team points classification.

In addition to the classifications above, there were several minor classifications; in total the 1979 Tour de France contained sixteen competitions, each with its own sponsor. In addition, there was a combativity award given after each mass-start stage to the cyclist considered most combative. The decision was made by a jury composed of journalists who gave points. The cyclist with the most points from votes in all stages led the combativity classification. Joop Zoetemelk won this classification, and was given overall the super-combativity award; he was later disqualified after his doping offence (see below) and Hennie Kuiper received the award. The Souvenir Henri Desgrange was given in honour of Tour founder Henri Desgrange to the first rider to pass the summit of the Col du Galibier on stage 17. This prize was won by Lucien Van Impe.

Classification leadership by stage
Stage	Stage winner	General classification	Points classification	Mountains classification	Young rider classification	Intermediate sprints classification	Team classifications		Combativity award
Stage	Stage winner	General classification	Points classification	Mountains classification	Young rider classification	Intermediate sprints classification	By time	By points	Combativity award
P	Gerrie Knetemann	Gerrie Knetemann	Gerrie Knetemann	no award	Leo van Vliet	no award	TI–Raleigh–McGregor	TI–Raleigh–McGregor	no award
1	René Bittinger	Jean-René Bernaudeau	Jean-René Bernaudeau	Giovanni Battaglin	Jean-René Bernaudeau	Jean-René Bernaudeau	TI–Raleigh–McGregor	TI–Raleigh–McGregor	Robert Alban
2	Bernard Hinault	Bernard Hinault	Bernard Hinault	Bernard Hinault	Jean-René Bernaudeau	Jean-René Bernaudeau	TI–Raleigh–McGregor	TI–Raleigh–McGregor	no award
3	Bernard Hinault	Bernard Hinault	Bernard Hinault	Mariano Martínez	Jean-René Bernaudeau	René Bittinger	Renault–Gitane	Renault–Gitane	Pierre-Raymond Villemiane
4	TI–Raleigh–McGregor	Bernard Hinault	Bernard Hinault	Mariano Martínez	Jean-René Bernaudeau	René Bittinger	Renault–Gitane	Renault–Gitane	no award
5	Jan Raas	Bernard Hinault	Bernard Hinault	Mariano Martínez	Jean-René Bernaudeau	Philippe Tesnière	Renault–Gitane	Renault–Gitane	Gerrie Knetemann
6	Jos Jacobs	Bernard Hinault	Bernard Hinault	Mariano Martínez	Jean-René Bernaudeau	Philippe Tesnière	Renault–Gitane	Renault–Gitane	Michel Laurent
7	Leo van Vliet	Bernard Hinault	Bernard Hinault	Mariano Martínez	Jean-René Bernaudeau	Philippe Tesnière	Renault–Gitane	Renault–Gitane	Christian Poirier
8	TI–Raleigh–McGregor	Bernard Hinault	Bernard Hinault	Mariano Martínez	Jean-René Bernaudeau	Philippe Tesnière	Renault–Gitane	Renault–Gitane	no award
9	Ludo Delcroix	Joop Zoetemelk	Bernard Hinault	Mariano Martínez	Jean-René Bernaudeau	Philippe Tesnière	Miko–Mercier–Vivagel	IJsboerke–Warncke Eis	Bernard Hinault
10	Jo Maas	Joop Zoetemelk	Bernard Hinault	Mariano Martínez	Jean-René Bernaudeau	Philippe Tesnière	IJsboerke–Warncke Eis	IJsboerke–Warncke Eis	Didier Vanoverschelde
11	Bernard Hinault	Joop Zoetemelk	Bernard Hinault	Mariano Martínez	Jean-René Bernaudeau	Philippe Tesnière	IJsboerke–Warncke Eis	IJsboerke–Warncke Eis	no award
12	Hennie Kuiper	Joop Zoetemelk	Bernard Hinault	Mariano Martínez	Jean-René Bernaudeau	Philippe Tesnière	IJsboerke–Warncke Eis	IJsboerke–Warncke Eis	Giovanni Battaglin
13	Pierre-Raymond Villemiane	Joop Zoetemelk	Bernard Hinault	Giovanni Battaglin	Jean-René Bernaudeau	Philippe Tesnière	IJsboerke–Warncke Eis	IJsboerke–Warncke Eis	Giovanni Battaglin
14	Marc Demeyer	Joop Zoetemelk	Bernard Hinault	Giovanni Battaglin	Jean-René Bernaudeau	Philippe Tesnière	IJsboerke–Warncke Eis	IJsboerke–Warncke Eis	Nazzareno Berto
15	Bernard Hinault	Bernard Hinault	Bernard Hinault	Giovanni Battaglin	Jean-René Bernaudeau	Philippe Tesnière	IJsboerke–Warncke Eis	IJsboerke–Warncke Eis	no award
16	Lucien Van Impe	Bernard Hinault	Bernard Hinault	Giovanni Battaglin	Jean-René Bernaudeau	Philippe Tesnière	IJsboerke–Warncke Eis	IJsboerke–Warncke Eis	Eddy Schepers
17	Joaquim Agostinho	Bernard Hinault	Bernard Hinault	Giovanni Battaglin	Jean-René Bernaudeau	Philippe Tesnière	Renault–Gitane	IJsboerke–Warncke Eis	Joaquim Agostinho
18	Joop Zoetemelk	Bernard Hinault	Bernard Hinault	Giovanni Battaglin	Jean-René Bernaudeau	Philippe Tesnière	Renault–Gitane	Renault–Gitane	Joop Zoetemelk
19	Dietrich Thurau	Bernard Hinault	Bernard Hinault	Giovanni Battaglin	Jean-René Bernaudeau	Philippe Tesnière	Renault–Gitane	Renault–Gitane	Willy Teirlinck
20	Serge Parsani	Bernard Hinault	Bernard Hinault	Giovanni Battaglin	Jean-René Bernaudeau	Philippe Tesnière	Renault–Gitane	Renault–Gitane	Serge Parsani
21	Bernard Hinault	Bernard Hinault	Bernard Hinault	Giovanni Battaglin	Jean-René Bernaudeau	Willy Teirlinck	Renault–Gitane	Renault–Gitane	no award
22	Gerrie Knetemann	Bernard Hinault	Bernard Hinault	Giovanni Battaglin	Jean-René Bernaudeau	Willy Teirlinck	Renault–Gitane	Renault–Gitane	Giovanni Battaglin
23	Bernard Hinault	Bernard Hinault	Bernard Hinault	Giovanni Battaglin	Jean-René Bernaudeau	Willy Teirlinck	Renault–Gitane	Renault–Gitane	Giovanni Battaglin
24	Bernard Hinault	Bernard Hinault	Bernard Hinault	Giovanni Battaglin	Jean-René Bernaudeau	Willy Teirlinck	Renault–Gitane	Renault–Gitane	Joop Zoetemelk
Final		Bernard Hinault	Bernard Hinault	Giovanni Battaglin	Jean-René Bernaudeau	Willy Teirlinck	Renault–Gitane	Renault–Gitane	Joop Zoetemelk

== Final standings ==
Legend
A yellow jersey.	Denotes the winner of the general classification	A green jersey.	Denotes the winner of the points classification
A white jersey with red polka dots.	Denotes the winner of the mountains classification	A white jersey.	Denotes the winner of the young rider classification

=== General classification ===
Final general classification (1–10)
Rank	Rider	Team	Time
1	Bernard Hinault (FRA)	Renault–Gitane	103h 06' 50"
2	Joop Zoetemelk (NED)	Miko–Mercier–Vivagel	+ 13' 07"
3	Joaquim Agostinho (POR)	Flandria–Ça va seul	+ 26' 53"
4	Hennie Kuiper (NED)	Peugeot–Esso–Michelin	+ 28' 02"
5	Jean-René Bernaudeau (FRA)	Renault–Gitane	+ 32' 43"
6	Giovanni Battaglin (ITA)	Inoxpran	+ 38' 12"
7	Jo Maas (NED)	DAF Trucks–Aida	+ 38' 38"
8	Paul Wellens (BEL)	TI–Raleigh–McGregor	+ 39' 06"
9	Claude Criquielion (BEL)	Kas–Campagnolo	+ 40' 38"
10	Dietrich Thurau (FRG)	IJsboerke–Warncke Eis	+ 44' 35"

Final general classification (11–89)
Rank	Rider	Team	Time
11	Lucien Van Impe (BEL)	Kas–Campagnolo	+ 47' 26"
12	Sven-Åke Nilsson (SWE)	Miko–Mercier–Vivagel	+ 48' 16"
13	Pierre-Raymond Villemiane (FRA)	Renault–Gitane	+ 59' 09"
14	Johan van der Velde (NED)	TI–Raleigh–McGregor	+ 59' 13"
15	Eddy Schepers (BEL)	DAF Trucks–Aida	+ 59' 51"
16	Mariano Martínez (FRA)	La Redoute–Motobécane	+ 1h 01' 36"
17	Yves Hézard (FRA)	Peugeot–Esso–Michelin	+ 1h 03' 05"
18	Henk Lubberding (NED)	TI–Raleigh–McGregor	+ 1h 03' 09"
19	Robert Alban (FRA)	Fiat	+ 1h 06' 49"
20	Bernard Vallet (FRA)	La Redoute–Motobécane	+ 1h 08' 25"
21	Jos Deschoenmaecker (BEL)	Flandria–Ça va seul	+ 1h 09' 32"
22	Christian Seznec (FRA)	Miko–Mercier–Vivagel	+ 1h 09' 52"
23	Rudy Pevenage (BEL)	IJsboerke–Warncke Eis	+ 1h 11' 24"
24	Raymond Martin (FRA)	Miko–Mercier–Vivagel	+ 1h 14' 30"
25	René Martens (BEL)	Flandria–Ça va seul	+ 1h 14' 46"
26	René Bittinger (FRA)	Flandria–Ça va seul	+ 1h 19' 57"
27	Knut Knudsen (NOR)	Bianchi–Faema	+ 1h 24' 38"
28	Francisco Galdós (ESP)	Kas–Campagnolo	+ 1h 26' 49"
29	Lucien Didier (LUX)	Renault–Gitane	+ 1h 27' 28"
30	Gerrie Knetemann (NED)	TI–Raleigh–McGregor	+ 1h 39' 13"
31	Hendrik Devos (BEL)	Flandria–Ça va seul	+ 1h 40' 00"
32	Alessandro Pozzi (ITA)	Bianchi–Faema	+ 1h 42' 36"
33	Pierre Bazzo (FRA)	La Redoute–Motobécane	+ 1h 43' 07"
34	Alain Meslet (FRA)	Fiat	+ 1h 45' 39"
35	Jean Chassang (FRA)	Renault–Gitane	+ 1h 46' 46"
36	Ludo Peeters (BEL)	IJsboerke–Warncke Eis	+ 1h 52' 30"
37	Michel Laurent (FRA)	Peugeot–Esso–Michelin	+ 1h 53' 25"
38	Sean Kelly (IRE)	Splendor–Euro Soap	+ 1h 54' 36"
39	Ludo Delcroix (BEL)	IJsboerke–Warncke Eis	+ 1h 55' 58"
40	Jacques Michaud (FRA)	Flandria–Ça va seul	+ 1h 57' 13"
41	Didier Vanoverschelde (FRA)	La Redoute–Motobécane	+ 1h 59' 22"
42	Bernard Becaas (FRA)	Renault–Gitane	+ 1h 59' 26"
43	Joseph Borguet (BEL)	Kas–Campagnolo	+ 2h 00' 07"
44	Bert Pronk (NED)	TI–Raleigh–McGregor	+ 2h 01' 06"
45	Jos Jacobs (BEL)	IJsboerke–Warncke Eis	+ 2h 03' 17"
46	Gilbert Duclos-Lassalle (FRA)	Peugeot–Esso–Michelin	+ 2h 10' 07"
47	Maurice Le Guilloux (FRA)	Renault–Gitane	+ 2h 10' 49"
48	Fedor Iwan den Hertog (NED)	IJsboerke–Warncke Eis	+ 2h 11' 29"
49	Hubert Mathis (FRA)	Miko–Mercier–Vivagel	+ 2h 13' 38"
50	Jean-Louis Gauthier (FRA)	Miko–Mercier–Vivagel	+ 2h 15' 23"
51	Christian Levavasseur (FRA)	Miko–Mercier–Vivagel	+ 2h 15' 30"
52	Ferdinand Julien (FRA)	Fiat	+ 2h 16' 05"
53	Patrick Friou (FRA)	Miko–Mercier–Vivagel	+ 2h 16' 37"
54	Glauco Santoni (ITA)	Bianchi–Faema	+ 2h 17' 21"
55	Alain De Carvalho (FRA)	Fiat	+ 2h 22' 32"
56	Willy Teirlinck (BEL)	Kas–Campagnolo	+ 2h 23' 20"
57	Marc Demeyer (BEL)	Flandria–Ça va seul	+ 2h 23' 49"
58	Guido Van Calster (BEL)	DAF Trucks–Aida	+ 2h 24' 29"
59	André Chalmel (FRA)	Renault–Gitane	+ 2h 27' 31"
60	Jacques Bossis (FRA)	Peugeot–Esso–Michelin	+ 2h 28' 58"
61	René Dillen (BEL)	Kas–Campagnolo	+ 2h 29' 45"
62	Patrick Bonnet (FRA)	Flandria–Ça va seul	+ 2h 30' 35"
63	Roger Legeay (FRA)	Peugeot–Esso–Michelin	+ 2h 32' 06"
64	Dorino Vanzo (ITA)	Inoxpran	+ 2h 33' 50"
65	Michel Balbuena (ESP)	Fiat	+ 2h 34' 23"
66	Serge Parsani (ITA)	Bianchi–Faema	+ 2h 37' 45"
67	Joël Gallopin (FRA)	Miko–Mercier–Vivagel	+ 2h 42' 06"
68	Christian Jourdan (FRA)	La Redoute–Motobécane	+ 2h 42' 41"
69	Patrice Thevenard (FRA)	Flandria–Ça va seul	+ 2h 43' 39"
70	André Mollet (FRA)	Miko–Mercier–Vivagel	+ 2h 46' 32"
71	Pol Verschuere (BEL)	Flandria–Ça va seul	+ 2h 46' 53"
72	Jean-Marie Michel (FRA)	La Redoute–Motobécane	+ 2h 48' 02"
73	Jean-François Pescheux (FRA)	La Redoute–Motobécane	+ 2h 48' 12"
74	Hubert Arbès (FRA)	Renault–Gitane	+ 2h 49' 43"
75	Stefan Mutter (SUI)	TI–Raleigh–McGregor	+ 2h 52' 29"
76	Wim Myngheer (BEL)	Splendor–Euro Soap	+ 2h 55' 00"
77	Bruno Leali (ITA)	Inoxpran	+ 2h 56' 59"
78	Bernardo Alfonsel (ESP)	Kas–Campagnolo	+ 3h 00' 12"
79	Bernard Bourreau (FRA)	Peugeot–Esso–Michelin	+ 3h 02' 04"
80	Gilbert Lelay (FRA)	Fiat	+ 3h 02' 22"
81	Paul Sherwen (GBR)	Fiat	+ 3h 03' 46"
82	Maurizio Bellet (ITA)	DAF Trucks–Aida	+ 3h 09' 25"
83	Andrês Oliva (ESP)	Teka	+ 3h 11' 14"
84	Dominique Sanders (FRA)	Teka	+ 3h 13' 58"
85	José De Cauwer (BEL)	Peugeot–Esso–Michelin	+ 3h 20' 28"
86	Eulalio García (ESP)	Teka	+ 3h 27' 14"
87	Serge Beucherie (FRA)	Fiat	+ 3h 38' 54"
88	Alex Van Linden (BEL)	Bianchi–Faema	+ 3h 49' 57"
89	Gerhard Schönbacher (AUT)	DAF Trucks–Aida	+ 4h 19' 21"

=== Points classification ===
Final points classification (1–10)
Rank	Rider	Team	Points
1	Bernard Hinault (FRA)	Renault–Gitane	253
2	Dietrich Thurau (FRG)	IJsboerke–Warncke Eis	157
3	Joop Zoetemelk (NED)	Miko–Mercier–Vivagel	109
4	Marc Demeyer (BEL)	Flandria–Ça va seul	104
5	Hennie Kuiper (NED)	Peugeot–Esso–Michelin	79
6	Lucien Van Impe (BEL)	Kas–Campagnolo	67
7	Sean Kelly (IRE)	Splendor–Euro Soap	66
8	Guido Van Calster (BEL)	DAF Trucks–Aida	65
9	Giovanni Battaglin (ITA)	Inoxpran	64
10	Rudy Pevenage (BEL)	IJsboerke–Warncke Eis	61

=== Mountains classification ===
Final mountains classification (1–10)
Rank	Rider	Team	Points
1	Giovanni Battaglin (ITA)	Inoxpran	239
2	Bernard Hinault (FRA)	Renault–Gitane	196
3	Mariano Martínez (FRA)	La Redoute–Motobécane	158
4	Joop Zoetemelk (NED)	Miko–Mercier–Vivagel	141
5	Lucien Van Impe (BEL)	Kas–Campagnolo	118
6	Hennie Kuiper (NED)	Peugeot–Esso–Michelin	108
7	Joaquim Agostinho (POR)	Flandria–Ça va seul	96
8	Jean-René Bernaudeau (FRA)	Renault–Gitane	67
9	Sven-Åke Nilsson (SWE)	Miko–Mercier–Vivagel	67
10	René Bittinger (FRA)	Flandria–Ça va seul	49

=== Young rider classification ===
Final young rider classification (1–10)
Rank	Rider	Team	Time
1	Jean-René Bernaudeau (FRA)	Renault–Gitane	103h 39' 33"
2	Claude Criquielion (BEL)	Kas–Campagnolo	+ 7' 55"
3	Johan van der Velde (NED)	TI–Raleigh–McGregor	+ 26' 30"
4	Eddy Schepers (BEL)	DAF Trucks–Aida	+ 27' 08"
5	René Martens (BEL)	Flandria–Ça va seul	+ 42' 03"
6	Hendrik Devos (BEL)	Flandria–Ça va seul	+ 1h 07' 17"
7	Sean Kelly (IRE)	Splendor–Euro Soap	+ 1h 21' 53"
8	Bernard Becaas (FRA)	Renault–Gitane	+ 1h 26' 43"
9	Jean-Louis Gauthier (FRA)	Miko–Mercier–Vivagel	+1h 42' 40"
10	Christian Levavasseur (FRA)	Miko–Mercier–Vivagel	+ 1h 42' 47"

=== Intermediate sprints classification ===
Final intermediate sprints classification (1–9)
Rank	Rider	Team	Points
1	Willy Teirlinck (BEL)	Kas–Campagnolo	93
2	Pierre-Raymond Villemiane (FRA)	Renault–Gitane	82
3	Bernard Hinault (FRA)	Renault–Gitane	53
4	Dietrich Thurau (FRG)	IJsboerke–Warncke Eis	31
5	Hennie Kuiper (NED)	Peugeot–Esso–Michelin	30
6	Joop Zoetemelk (NED)	Miko–Mercier–Vivagel	29
7	Pol Verschuere (BEL)	Flandria–Ça va seul	16
8	Lucien Van Impe (BEL)	Kas–Campagnolo	21
9	Christian Seznec (FRA)	Miko–Mercier–Vivagel	19

=== Team classification ===
Final team classification (1–10)
Rank	Team	Time
1	Renault–Gitane	414h 45' 46"
2	Flandria–Ça va seul	+ 10' 29"
3	TI–Raleigh–McGregor	+ 15' 22"
4	Miko–Mercier–Vivagel	+ 23' 12"
5	IJsboerke–Warncke Eis	+ 40' 50"
6	Kas–Campagnolo	+ 1h 18' 51"
7	Peugeot–Esso–Michelin	+ 2h 20' 07"
8	La Redoute–Motobécane	+ 2h 29' 24"
9	Fiat	+ 3h 31' 12"
10	DAF Trucks–Aida	+ 3h 39' 46"

=== Team points classification ===
Final team points classification (1–10)
Rank	Team	Time
1	Renault–Gitane	1008
2	IJsboerke–Warncke Eis	1057
3	TI–Raleigh–McGregor	1165
4	Miko–Mercier–Vivagel	1353
5	Flandria–Ça va seul	1407
6	La Redoute–Motobécane	1558
7	Peugeot–Esso–Michelin	1602
8	Kas–Campagnolo	1767
9	DAF Trucks–Aida	2050
10	Fiat	2064

== Aftermath ==
The Tour organisation did not like the attention that the last-placed riders received, and for the next year made a new rule that after several stages the last-placed cyclist in the general classification would be removed from the race.

== Bibliography ==
- Augendre, Jacques (2016). Guide historique [Historical guide] (PDF) (in French). Paris: Amaury Sport Organisation. Archived (PDF) from the original on 17 August 2016.
- de Mondenard, Jean-Pierre (2004). Dictionnaire du dopage (in French). Paris: Elsevier Masson. ISBN 978-2-294-00714-9.
- Martin, Pierre; Penazzo, Sergio (1979). Tour 79: The Stories of the 1979 Tour of Italy and Tour de France. Keighley, UK: Kennedy Brothers Publishing. OCLC 67664372.
- McGann, Bill; McGann, Carol (2008). The Story of the Tour de France: 1965–2007. Vol. 2. Indianapolis: Dog Ear Publishing. ISBN 978-1-59858-608-4.
- Nauright, John; Parrish, Charles (2012). Sports Around the World: History, Culture, and Practice. Vol. 2. Santa Barbara, California: ABC-CLIO. ISBN 978-1-59884-300-2.
- van den Akker, Pieter (2018). Tour de France Rules and Statistics: 1903–2018. Self-published. ISBN 978-1-79398-080-9.
