= Giro delle Marche =

Race details
- Date: September
- Region: Marche, Italy
- English name: Tour of Marche
- Discipline: Road
- Type: One-day race

History
- First edition: 1941
- Editions: 11
- Final edition: 1976
- First winner: Osvaldo Bailo (ITA)
- Final winner: Pierino Gavazzi (ITA)

The Giro delle Marche was a single-day road cycling race held annually in Marche, Italy from 1941 to 1942 and from 1968 to 1976.

== Winners ==
Year	Winner	Second	Third
1941	(Italy) Osvaldo Bailo	(Italy) Primo Zuccotti	(Italy) Vasco Bergamaschi
1942	(Italy) Fausto Marini	(Italy) Aldemiro Dragomanni	(Italy) Domenico Arcangeli
1968	(Italy) Luciano Dalla Bona	(Italy) Aldo Moser	(Italy) Ercole Gualazzini
1969	(Italy) Costantino Conti	(Denmark) Ole Ritter	(Italy) Francesco Desaymonet
1970	(Italy) Italo Zilioli	(Italy) Enrico Paolini	(Denmark) Ole Ritter
1971	(Sweden) Gösta Pettersson	(Sweden) Erik Pettersson	(Italy) Arturo Pecchielan
1972	(Italy) Michele Dancelli	(Italy) Carlo Chiappano	(Italy) Primo Mori
1973	(Italy) Sigfrido Fontanelli	(Italy) Enrico Maggioni	(Italy) Michele Dancelli
1974	(Colombia) Martín Emilio Rodríguez	(Denmark) Ole Ritter	(Italy) Valerio Lualdi
1975	(Italy) Serge Parsani	(Italy) Enrico Paolini	(Italy) Giacinto Santambrogio
1976	(Italy) Pierino Gavazzi	(Belgium) Roger De Vlaeminck	(Italy) Francesco Moser
