= Averton =

- Commune
- Coat of arms
- Location of Averton
- Location within France Location within Pays de la Loire
- Coordinates: 48°19′59″N 0°13′23″W
- Country: France
- Region: Pays de la Loire
- Department: Mayenne
- Arrondissement: Mayenne
- Canton: Villaines-la-Juhel
- Intercommunality: CC Mont Avaloirs

Government
  - Mayor (2020–2026): Jean-Paul Pichonnier
- Area^{1}: 40.62 km^{2} (15.68 sq mi)
- Elevation: 108 m (354 ft)
- Highest elevation: 292 m (958 ft)
- Lowest elevation: 124 m (407 ft)
- Population (2023): 552
  - Density: 13.6/km^{2} (35.2/sq mi)
- Time zone: UTC+01:00 (CET)
  - Summer (DST): UTC+02:00 (CEST)
- INSEE/Postal code: 53013 /53700
- ^{1} French Land Register data, which excludes lakes, ponds, glaciers > 1 km^{2} (0.386 sq mi or 247 acres) and river estuaries.

Averton (French pronunciation: [avɛʁtɔ̃]) is a commune in the Mayenne department in northwestern France.

== Population ==
Historical population
Year	Pop.	±% p.a.
1968	542	—
1975	521	−0.56%
1982	551	+0.80%
1990	582	+0.69%
1999	601	+0.36%
2007	637	+0.73%
2012	611	−0.83%
2017	585	−0.87%
2023	552	−0.96%
Source: INSEE

== See also ==
- Communes of Mayenne
