= Paul Wellens (cyclist) =

Belgian cyclist

Personal information
- Full name: Paul Wellens
- Born: 27 June 1952 (age 74) Hasselt, Belgium

Cycling career
- Sport: Cycling
- Current team: Retired
- Discipline: Road
- Role: Rider

Professional teams
- 1976: Miko–de Gribaldy
- 1977: Frisol–Thirion–Gazelle
- 1978–1980: TI–Raleigh
- 1981: Boule d'Or–Colnago–Campagnolo
- 1982: Wickes–Bouwmarkt–Splendor
- 1983: Eorotex–Magniflex
- 1984: Ariostea
- 1985: Tönissteiner–TW Rock–BASF
- 1986: Miko–Carlos

Major wins
- Tour de France, 2 individual stages and 5 TTT stages Tour de Suisse (1978)

Paul Wellens (born 27 June 1952 in Hasselt) is a Belgian former professional road bicycle racer.

== Cycling career ==
In 1978, he won the combativity award in the Tour de France. He won two individual tour stages during his career: in 1977 he won stage 15a to Morzine in a solo breakaway, leading alone over the summit of the Col du Corbier and crossing the finish line with a three-minute lead over the peloton, and the following year he won the stage to Super Besse. He was also part of the TI–Raleigh squads which took a team time trial win in the 1978 Tour, two further TTT victories the next year and another two in the 1980 edition of the race. In addition he took two top ten finishes on the Tour's general classification, placing sixth in 1978 and eighth as TI–Raleigh's leader in 1979. He also won the 1978 Tour de Suisse. He is the brother of fellow racing cyclists Leo and Johan Wellens and the uncle of cyclist Tim Wellens. At the 1981 Tour de France, he and his brothers all rode for the Sunair–Sport 80–Colnago team as domestiques for Freddy Maertens.

== Major results ==
1977
Orchies
Stage 2, Tour of the Basque Country
Tour de France:

Winner stage 15A

1978
Kamerik
Tour de Suisse
Tour de France:

Winner stages 4 (TTT) & 13
6th place overall classification

1979
Beringen
Koersel
Tour de France:

Winner stages 4 (TTT) & 8 (TTT)
8th place overall classification

1980
Tour de France:

Winner stages 1b (TTT) & 7a (TTT)

1983
Stage 12, Tour de l'Avenir
