= Ludo Delcroix =

Belgian cyclist (born 1950)

Personal information
- Full name: Ludo Delcroix
- Born: 28 October 1950 (age 75) Kalmthout, Belgium

Cycling career
- Sport: Cycling
- Discipline: Road
- Role: Rider

Professional teams
- 1973: Flandria-Shimano
- 1974–1976: Molteni
- 1977: Fiat
- 1978–1980: Ijsboerke
- 1981–1982: Capri Sonne

Major wins
- 1 stage, 1979 Tour de France

Ludo Delcroix (born 28 October 1950) was a Belgian professional road bicycle racer, who won the 9th stage in the 1979 Tour de France. He also competed in the team time trial at the 1972 Summer Olympics.

== Major results ==
1972
4th, 1972 Olympic Games – Team Time Trial
1973
1st, Onze-Lieve-Vrouw Waver, Sint-Amandsberg & Wondelgem
5th, Züri-Metzgete
1974
1st, Omloop Polder-Kempen
1975
1st, Omloop Leiedal
1976
1st, Sinaai
1977
1st, Circuit Franco-Belge
1st, Stage 5, Tour de Romandie
1978
1st, Omloop Polder-Kempen
1st, Stage 3a, Étoile des Espoirs
1st, Stage 2, Three Days of De Panne
1st, Boezinge, Oostakker & Zele
1979
1st, Stage 9, Tour de France
1st, Berlare & Nieuwmoer
1980
1st, Grote Prijs Jef Scherens
1st, Stage 1, Ronde van Nederland
1st, Boechout & Purnode
1981
1st, Nieuwmoer
8th, Bordeaux–Paris
