= Serge Parsani =

Italian cyclist (born 1952)

Personal information
- Full name: Serge Parsani
- Born: 28 August 1952 (age 74) Gorcy, France

Cycling career
- Sport: Cycling
- Current team: Solution Tech NIPPO Rali
- Discipline: Road
- Role: Rider; Directeur sportif; General manager

Amateur team
- 1972–1973: GS Itla

Professional team
- 1974–1983: Bianchi–Campagnolo

Managerial teams
- 1987–1989: Gewiss–Bianchi
- 1993–1997: GB–MG Maglificio
- 1998: Asics–CGA
- 1999–2002: Mapei–Quick-Step
- 2003–2007: Quick-Step–Davitamon
- 2009: Team Katusha
- 2015–2016: Southeast Pro Cycling
- 2023–: Team Corratec–Selle Italia

Major wins
- Grand Tours Tour de France 1 individual stage (1979) Giro d'Italia 1 individual stage (1981) 1 TTT stage (1983)

Serge Parsani (born 28 August 1952 in Gorcy, France) is an Italian former professional road bicycle racer, who won one stage in the 1979 Tour de France. Currently, he is the general manager of UCI ProTeam Solution Tech NIPPO Rali.

== 1979 Tour de France ==
In the 1979 Tour de France, Parsani was in a breakaway together with Gerrie Knetemann in the 20th stage. At the end of the stage, Knetemann outsprinted Parsani, and Parsani was the second cyclist to cross the finishline. However, Knetemann received a 10-second penalty for being pulled by a car, and so Parsani became the winner of the stage.

== Major results ==
1972
1st Giro delle Due Province
10th Overall Giro Ciclistico d'Italia
1973
1st Trofeo Banca Popolare di Vicenza
1st Giro delle Due Province
1st Coppa Cicogna
1st Stage 5 Settimana Ciclistica Bergamasca
8th Overall Giro Ciclistico d'Italia
1975
1st Giro delle Marche
3rd Tre Valli Varesine
1977
3rd Trofeo Baracchi (with Osvaldo Bettoni)
7th Coppa Agostoni
1978
3rd Grand Prix de Saint-Raphaël
1979
1st Stage 20 Tour de France
3rd Trofeo Matteotti
1980
1st Sassari–Cagliari
1st Stage 1a (TTT) Paris–Nice
2nd Tour du Nord-Ouest
6th Overall Giro del Trentino
8th Tre Valli Varesine
1981
1st Stage 9 Giro d'Italia
1982
8th Gran Premio Città di Camaiore
9th Coppa Placci
1983
1st Stage 3 (TTT) Giro d'Italia
