= Christian Poirier =

French cyclist

Personal information
- Born: 6 December 1954 (age 71) Château-Gontier, France

Cycling career
- Sport: Cycling
- Discipline: Road
- Role: Rider

Professional teams
- 1977–1978: Lejeune–BP
- 1979–1980: La Redoute–Motobécane

Christian Poirier (born 6 December 1954) is a French former racing cyclist. He rode in the 1979 Tour de France, but did not finish.

== Major results ==
1976
2nd Overall Tour du Loir-et-Cher
1977
3rd Paris–Bourges
