= Ueli Sutter =

Swiss cyclist (1947–2025)

Personal information
- Born: 16 March 1947 Bettlach, Switzerland
- Died: 9 December 2025 (aged 78)

Cycling career
- Sport: Cycling
- Discipline: Road
- Role: Rider

Professional teams
- 1973: Möbel Märki–Bonanza
- 1973–1974: Jollj Ceramica
- 1974–1978: Zonca
- 1974–1975: Wilner–Birr–Brügg
- 1976: Möbel Märki–Bonanza
- 1977: Jelmoli
- 1979: Willora–Mairag–Piz Buin
- 1979: TI–Raleigh
- 1980: Bianchi–Piaggio
- 1981: Cilo–Aufina

Major wins
- Grand Tours Tour de France 2 TTT stages (1979) Giro d'Italia Mountains classification (1978)

Ueli Sutter (16 March 1947 – 9 December 2025) was a Swiss cyclist. He competed in the individual road race and team time trial events at the 1972 Summer Olympics.

Sutter died on 9 December 2025, at the age of 78.

== Major results ==
1972
1st Stage 5 Tour de l'Avenir
1974
3rd Road race, National Road Championships
1975
3rd Road race, National Road Championships
1976
2nd Road race, National Road Championships
1977
4th Overall Tour de Suisse
1978
2nd Overall Tour de Suisse
10th Overall Giro d'Italia

1st Mountains classification

1979
1st Stages 4 (TTT) & 8 (TTT) Tour de France
6th Overall Tour de Suisse
1981
6th Overall Tour de Suisse
