= René Bittinger =

French cyclist

Personal information
- Full name: René Bittinger
- Born: 9 October 1954 (age 72) Villé, France

Cycling career
- Sport: Cycling
- Current team: Retired
- Discipline: Road
- Role: Rider

Major wins
- 1 stage 1979 Tour de France

René Bittinger (born 9 October 1954, in Villé) is a French former professional road bicycle racer. He competed in the individual road race event at the 1976 Summer Olympics.

== Major results ==
1979
Ambert
Tour de France:

Winner stage 1

1980
Tour du Limousin
1982
Antibes
Nice-Alassio
1983
Montauroux
