= Jean-René Bernaudeau =

French cyclist

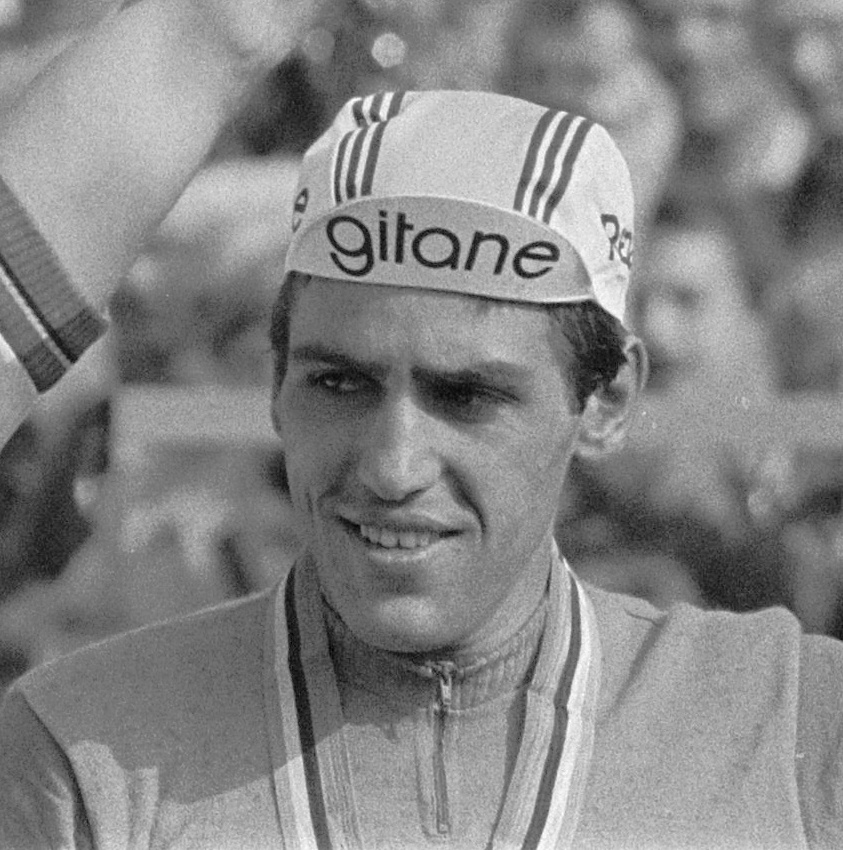
- Bernaudeau in 1979

Personal information
- Full name: Jean-René Bernaudeau
- Born: 8 July 1956 (age 70) Saint-Maurice-le-Girard, Vendée, France

Cycling career
- Sport: Cycling
- Current team: Team TotalEnergies
- Discipline: Road
- Role: Rider (retired); General manager

Professional teams
- 1978–1980: Renault
- 1981–1982: Peugeot
- 1983: Wolber
- 1984: Système U
- 1985–1988: Fagor

Managerial teams
- 1996–1999: Vendée U
- 2000–: Bonjour

Jean-René Bernaudeau (born 8 July 1956) is a French former road bicycle racer, who competed professionally from 1978 to 1988. Bernaudeau currently works as the general manager for UCI ProTeam Team TotalEnergies.

In 1982, he said that dope controls in cycling were a breach of the freedom of work. Before turning professional he represented France competing in the individual road race event at the 1976 Summer Olympics.

Career highlights include four wins in the Grand Prix du Midi Libre between 1980 and 1983, winning a Bronze medal at the 1979 World Championship road race, as well as wearing the yellow jersey as leader of the general classification for one day after the first stage in the 1979 Tour de France. He would also win the best young rider classification in the 1979 Tour and would go on to finish in 5th place overall. As the high mountains and the third week began in the 1980 Tour de France Bernaudeau rose through the standings getting as high as 5th behind leading GC riders Zoetemelk, Kuiper, Martin and de Muynck. He DNS stage 18. He would finish in the top 10 of the 1981 Tour de France, in 1982 he finished 13th and in 1983 he finished in the top 10 again. He DNF either the 1984 or 1985 editions but did finish the final two of his career, finishing 26th and 17th respectively.

For the team's entire existence he has been involved with Team TotalEnergies in all of its different variations between Continental level and UCI World Tour level. Thomas Voeckler spent his entire career riding for Bernaudeau and became known all over France for his spirited defense of the Yellow Jersey during the 2011 Tour de France where he held the jersey against all odds until the final climb of the final high mountain stage, which was Alpe d'Huez. Voeckler's 2011 contract from Team Europcar was worth €420,000 a year, which made him the second highest-paid French cyclist after Sylvain Chavanel. He turned down a contract for nearly double the pay from Team Cofidis to stay riding for Bernaudeau.

His son Giovanni Bernaudeau was on his team for 11 seasons until he retired in 2015.

== Notable victories ==
- Grand Prix du Midi Libre 1980, 1981, 1982, 1983
- Paris–Bourges: 1979
- Route du Sud: 1981
- Tour de Vendée: 1977, 1980
- Tour du Tarn: 1981
- Tour de Lorraine: 1982
- Grand prix de Monaco: 1981
- Bol d'Or des Monédières: 1983
