= Jo Maas =

Dutch cyclist

Personal information
- Full name: Jo Maas
- Born: 6 October 1954 (age 72) Eijsden, the Netherlands

Cycling career
- Sport: Cycling
- Discipline: Road
- Role: Rider

Major wins
- Grand Tours Tour de France 1 individual stage (1979)

Jo Maas (Eijsden, 6 October 1954) is a retired Dutch professional road bicycle racer. In the 1979 Tour de France, Maas won stage 10 and finished 7th place in the overall classification.

== Major results ==
1978
Romsée-Stavelot-Romsée
Tour du Hainaut Occidental
1979
Tour de France:

Winner stage 10
7th place overall classification
