= Didier Vanoverschelde =

French cyclist

Personal information
- Born: 5 April 1952 (age 74) Hallennes-lez-Haubourdin, France

Cycling career
- Sport: Cycling
- Role: Rider

Didier Vanoverschelde (born 5 April 1952) is a former French racing cyclist. He rode in five editions of the Tour de France between 1979 and 1983.
