= List of teams and cyclists in the 1982 Vuelta a España =

For the 1982 Vuelta a España, the field consisted of 100 riders; 76 finished the race.

== By rider ==
Legend
No.	Starting number worn by the rider during the Vuelta
Pos.	Position in the general classification
Time	Deficit to the winner of the general classification
DNF	Denotes a rider who did not finish

No.	Name	Nationality	Team	Pos.	Time	Ref
1	Juan Fernández Martín	Spain	Kelme–Merckx	20	+ 17' 17"	
2	Vicente Belda	Spain	Kelme–Merckx	18	+ 16' 18"	
3	Enrique Martínez Heredia	Spain	Kelme–Merckx	11	+ 6' 17"	
4	Jesús Guzmán Delgado	Spain	Kelme–Merckx	DNF	—	
5	Juan Pujol Pagés	Spain	Kelme–Merckx	26	+ 37' 59"	
6	José Recio	Spain	Kelme–Merckx	37	+ 1h 05' 55"	
7	Jeronimo Ibañez Escribano	Spain	Kelme–Merckx	54	+ 1h 42' 12"	
8	Jaime Vilamajó	Spain	Kelme–Merckx	8	+ 4' 19"	
9	Celestino Prieto	Spain	Kelme–Merckx	12	+ 6' 46"	
10	Roy Schuiten	Netherlands	Kelme–Merckx	32	+ 51' 20"	
11	Faustino Rupérez	Spain	Zor–Helios–Gemeaz Cusin	4	+ 2' 14"	
12	Pedro Muñoz Machín Rodríguez	Spain	Zor–Helios–Gemeaz Cusin	25	+ 37' 39"	
13	José Luis López Cerrón	Spain	Zor–Helios–Gemeaz Cusin	DNF	—	
14	José Viejo	Spain	Zor–Helios–Gemeaz Cusin	DNF	—	
15	Francisco Javier Cedena	Spain	Zor–Helios–Gemeaz Cusin	53	+ 1h 39' 37"	
16	Álvaro Pino	Spain	Zor–Helios–Gemeaz Cusin	10	+ 5' 53"	
17	José Antonio Cabrero Martínez	Spain	Zor–Helios–Gemeaz Cusin	48	+ 1h 33' 20"	
18	Isidro Juárez del Moral	Spain	Zor–Helios–Gemeaz Cusin	40	+ 1h 10' 36"	
19	Eduardo Chozas	Spain	Zor–Helios–Gemeaz Cusin	14	+ 9' 05"	
20	Ángel Camarillo	Spain	Zor–Helios–Gemeaz Cusin	33	+ 54' 42"	
21	Eddy Planckaert	Belgium	Splendor–Wickes Bouwmarkt	DNF	—	
22	Claude Criquielion	Belgium	Splendor–Wickes Bouwmarkt	DNF	—	
23	Jo Maas	Netherlands	Splendor–Wickes Bouwmarkt	21	+ 18' 42"	
24	Walter Planckaert	Belgium	Splendor–Wickes Bouwmarkt	52	+ 1h 38' 16"	
25	Paul Wellens	Belgium	Splendor–Wickes Bouwmarkt	16	+ 10' 32"	
26	Benny Van Brabant	Belgium	Splendor–Wickes Bouwmarkt	24	+ 33' 58"	
27	Jean-Philippe Vandenbrande	Belgium	Splendor–Wickes Bouwmarkt	34	+ 56' 57"	
28	Johnny Broers	Netherlands	Splendor–Wickes Bouwmarkt	28	+ 40' 06"	
29	Luc De Smet	Belgium	Splendor–Wickes Bouwmarkt	65	+ 2h 01' 05"	
30	Heddie Nieuwdorp	Netherlands	Splendor–Wickes Bouwmarkt	67	+ 2h 04' 07"	
31	Sven-Åke Nilsson	Sweden	Wolber–Spidel	3	+ 1' 17"	
32	Fabien De Vooght	France	Wolber–Spidel	62	+ 1h 55' 13"	
33	Pierre-Raymond Villemiane	France	Wolber–Spidel	6	+ 2' 43"	
34	Dominique Arnaud	France	Wolber–Spidel	22	+ 21' 11"	
35	Marc Gomez	France	Wolber–Spidel	35	+ 1h 00' 46"	
36	Jean-Pierre Guernion	France	Wolber–Spidel	51	+ 1h 34' 26"	
37	Marc Durant	France	Wolber–Spidel	9	+ 5' 10"	
38	Jean-François Rault	France	Wolber–Spidel	55	+ 1h 43' 32"	
39	Philippe Leleu	France	Wolber–Spidel	41	+ 1h 12' 39"	
40	Claude Vincendeau	France	Wolber–Spidel	36	+ 1h 03' 51"	
41	Ángel Arroyo	Spain	Reynolds	13	+ 8' 05"	
42	Pedro Delgado	Spain	Reynolds	29	+ 44' 29"	
43	Eulalio García	Spain	Reynolds	46	+ 1h 31' 04"	
44	Julián Gorospe	Spain	Reynolds	31	+ 49' 58"	
45	Anastasio Greciano	Spain	Reynolds	DNF	—	
46	Carlos Hernández Bailo	Spain	Reynolds	73	+ 2h 15' 40"	
47	Jesús Hernández Úbeda	Spain	Reynolds	49	+ 1h 34' 06"	
48	José Luis Laguía	Spain	Reynolds	5	+ 2' 37"	
49	Jesús Suárez Cueva	Spain	Reynolds	50	+ 1h 34' 18"	
50	Ricardo Zúñiga Carrasco	Spain	Reynolds	DNF	—	
51	Bernardo Alfonsel	Spain	Teka	17	+ 13' 55"	
52	Juan-Carlos Alonso	Spain	Teka	44	+ 1h 27' 27"	
53	Antonio Coll	Spain	Teka	DNF	—	
54	Manuel Esparza	Spain	Teka	DNF	—	
55	Federico Echave	Spain	Teka	38	+ 1h 06' 57"	
56	Alberto Fernández	Spain	Teka	15	+ 10' 02"	
57	Ismael Lejarreta	Spain	Teka	19	+ 17' 13"	
58	Marino Lejarreta	Spain	Teka	1	95h 47' 23"	
59	Paulino Martínez	Spain	Teka	42	+ 1h 14' 53"	
60	Felipe Yáñez	Spain	Teka	DNF	—	
61	Michel Pollentier	Belgium	Safir–Marc	2	+ 18"	
62	Philippe Poissonnier	France	Safir–Marc	45	+ 1h 28' 19"	
63	Wilfried Wesemael	Belgium	Safir–Marc	DNF	—	
64	Eddy Vanhaerens	Belgium	Safir–Marc	47	+ 1h 32' 56"	
65	Eddy Van Hoof	Belgium	Safir–Marc	61	+ 1h 52' 17"	
66	Johan Louwet	Belgium	Safir–Marc	74	+ 2h 24' 49"	
67	Marc Van Geel	Belgium	Safir–Marc	71	+ 2h 09' 59"	
68	Charles Jochums	Belgium	Safir–Marc	DNF	—	
69	Alain Desaever	Belgium	Safir–Marc	64	+ 1h 58' 07"	
70	Willy Sprangers	Belgium	Safir–Marc	58	+ 1h 49' 29"	
71	Gines García Pallares	Spain	Hueso	57	+ 1h 48' 57"	
72	José María González Barcala	Spain	Hueso	70	+ 2h 09' 55"	
73	Luis Vicente Otin	Spain	Hueso	23	+ 31' 00"	
74	Francisco Sala Oliveras	Spain	Hueso	30	+ 44' 56"	
75	Carlos Machín Rodríguez	Spain	Hueso	43	+ 1h 17' 47"	
76	Eugenio Herranz Bautista	Spain	Hueso	DNF	—	
77	José Teixeira Rodríguez	Spain	Hueso	DNF	—	
78	Alfonso José Blanco Palau	Spain	Hueso	DNF	—	
79	Miguel Ugartemendia Sargarzazu	Spain	Hueso	76	+ 2h 42' 41"	
80	Hugues Grondin	France	Hueso	56	+ 1h 44' 05"	
81	Guido Frei	Switzerland	Puch–Eorotex–Campagnolo	72	+ 2h 11' 13"	
82	Harald Maier	Austria	Puch–Eorotex–Campagnolo	59	+ 1h 50' 11"	
83	Hans Neumayer	West Germany	Puch–Eorotex–Campagnolo	68	+ 2h 09' 35"	
84	Gerhard Zadrobilek	Austria	Puch–Eorotex–Campagnolo	69	+ 2h 09' 36"	
85	Josef Wehrli	Switzerland	Puch–Eorotex–Campagnolo	DNF	—	
86	Erwin Lienhard	Switzerland	Puch–Eorotex–Campagnolo	27	+ 38' 23"	
87	Reimund Dietzen	West Germany	Puch–Eorotex–Campagnolo	39	+ 1h 08' 20"	
88	Gerhard Schönbacher	Austria	Puch–Eorotex–Campagnolo	60	+ 1h 50' 54"	
89	Daniel Girard	Switzerland	Puch–Eorotex–Campagnolo	DNF	—	
90	Stefan Mutter	Switzerland	Puch–Eorotex–Campagnolo	7	+ 4' 18"	
91	Dirk Heirweg	Belgium	Van de Ven-Moser	DNF	—	
92	Etienne Vandersnickt	Belgium	Van de Ven-Moser	DNF	—	
93	Paul van den Bossche	Belgium	Van de Ven-Moser	DNF	—	
94	Rudy Busselen	Belgium	Van de Ven-Moser	DNF	—	
95	Benny Schepmans	Belgium	Van de Ven-Moser	63	+ 1h 57' 04"	
96	Marc van den Brande	Belgium	Van de Ven-Moser	66	+ 2h 01' 11"	
97	Daniel Plummer	Belgium	Van de Ven-Moser	DNF	—	
98	Patrick Lerno	Belgium	Van de Ven-Moser	DNF	—	
99	Luc De Grauwe	Belgium	Van de Ven-Moser	DNF	—	
100	Maurice Van Heer	Belgium	Van de Ven-Moser	75	+ 2h 32' 05"	
