= 1982 Vuelta a España, Stage 10 to Stage 19 =

Cycling race stages

The 1982 Vuelta a España was the 37th edition of the Vuelta a España, one of cycling's Grand Tours. The Vuelta began in Santiago de Compostela, with a prologue individual time trial on 20 April, and Stage 10 occurred on 30 April with a stage from Puigcerdà. The race finished in Madrid on 9 May.

== Stage 10 ==
30 April 1982 — Puigcerdà to Sant Quirze del Vallès, 181 km (112 mi)

Stage 10 result

Rank	Rider	Team	Time
1	Sven-Åke Nilsson (SWE)	Wolber–Spidel	4h 27' 52"
2	Ángel Arroyo (ESP)	Reynolds	+ 1"
3	Pierre-Raymond Villemiane (FRA)	Wolber–Spidel	+ 1' 23"
4	Stefan Mutter (SUI)	Puch–Eorotex–Campagnolo	s.t.
5	José Luis Laguía (ESP)	Reynolds	s.t.

General classification after Stage 10

Rank	Rider	Team	Time
1	Ángel Arroyo (ESP)	Reynolds	55h 45' 26"
2	Sven-Åke Nilsson (SWE)	Wolber–Spidel	+ 57"
3	Claude Criquielion (BEL)	Splendor–Wickes Bouwmarkt	+ 1' 08"
4	Enrique Martínez Heredia (ESP)	Kelme–Merckx	+ 1' 19"
5	Alberto Fernández (ESP)	Teka	+ 1' 24"
6	Marino Lejarreta (ESP)	Teka	+ 1' 31"
7	José Luis Laguía (ESP)	Reynolds	+ 1' 40"
8	Faustino Rupérez (ESP)	Zor–Helios–Gemeaz Cusin	+ 1' 51"
9	Marc Durant (FRA)	Wolber–Spidel	+ 2' 14"
10	Pierre-Raymond Villemiane (FRA)	Wolber–Spidel	+ 2' 16"

== Stage 11 ==
1 May 1982 — Sant Quirze del Vallès to Barcelona, 143 km (89 mi)

Stage 11 result

Rank	Rider	Team	Time
1	José Luis Laguía (ESP)	Reynolds	3h 43' 09"
2	Stefan Mutter (SUI)	Puch–Eorotex–Campagnolo	+ 3"
3	Michel Pollentier (BEL)	Safir–Marc	s.t.
4	Juan Fernández Martín (ESP)	Kelme–Merckx	s.t.
5	Marino Lejarreta (ESP)	Teka	s.t.
6	Claude Criquielion (BEL)	Splendor–Wickes Bouwmarkt	s.t.
7	Sven-Åke Nilsson (SWE)	Wolber–Spidel	+ 9"
8	Enrique Martínez Heredia (ESP)	Kelme–Merckx	+ 18"
9	Marc Gomez (FRA)	Wolber–Spidel	+ 30"
10	Álvaro Pino (ESP)	Zor–Helios–Gemeaz Cusin	+ 43"

General classification after Stage 11

Rank	Rider	Team	Time
1	Ángel Arroyo (ESP)	Reynolds	59h 29' 29"
2	Sven-Åke Nilsson (SWE)	Wolber–Spidel	+ 13"
3	Claude Criquielion (BEL)	Splendor–Wickes Bouwmarkt	+ 17"
4	Marino Lejarreta (ESP)	Teka	+ 40"
5	Enrique Martínez Heredia (ESP)	Kelme–Merckx	+ 43"
6	José Luis Laguía (ESP)	Reynolds	+ 46"
7	Alberto Fernández (ESP)	Teka	+ 1' 24"
8	Michel Pollentier (BEL)	Safir–Marc	+ 1' 39"
9	Faustino Rupérez (ESP)	Zor–Helios–Gemeaz Cusin	+ 1' 45"
10	Pierre-Raymond Villemiane (FRA)	Wolber–Spidel	+ 2' 05"

== Stage 12 ==
2 May 1982 — Salou to Nules, 200 km (120 mi)

Stage 12 result

Rank	Rider	Team	Time
1	Eddy Planckaert (BEL)	Splendor–Wickes Bouwmarkt	5h 34' 32"
2	Eddy Vanhaerens (BEL)	Safir–Marc	s.t.
3	Eddy Van Hoof (BEL)	Safir–Marc	s.t.
4	Johan Louwet (BEL)	Safir–Marc	s.t.
5	Jean-Philippe Vandenbrande (BEL)	Splendor–Wickes Bouwmarkt	s.t.
6	Enrique Martínez Heredia (ESP)	Kelme–Merckx	s.t.
7	Marc Durant (FRA)	Wolber–Spidel	s.t.
8	Jesús Suárez Cueva (ESP)	Reynolds	s.t.
9	Stefan Mutter (SUI)	Puch–Eorotex–Campagnolo	s.t.
10	Francisco Javier Cedena (ESP)	Zor–Helios–Gemeaz Cusin	s.t.

General classification after Stage 12

Rank	Rider	Team	Time
1	Ángel Arroyo (ESP)	Reynolds	65h 04' 01"
2	Sven-Åke Nilsson (SWE)	Wolber–Spidel	+ 12"
3	Claude Criquielion (BEL)	Splendor–Wickes Bouwmarkt	+ 17"
4	Marino Lejarreta (ESP)	Teka	+ 40"
5	Enrique Martínez Heredia (ESP)	Kelme–Merckx	+ 43"
6	José Luis Laguía (ESP)	Reynolds	+ 45"
7	Alberto Fernández (ESP)	Teka	+ 1' 24"
8	Michel Pollentier (BEL)	Safir–Marc	+ 1' 29"
9	Faustino Rupérez (ESP)	Zor–Helios–Gemeaz Cusin	+ 1' 45"
10	Pierre-Raymond Villemiane (FRA)	Wolber–Spidel	+ 2' 05"

== Stage 13 ==
3 May 1982 — Nules to Antella, 195 km (121 mi)

Stage 13 result

Rank	Rider	Team	Time
1	José Recio (ESP)	Kelme–Merckx	5h 18' 09"
2	Gerhard Schönbacher (AUT)	Puch–Eorotex–Campagnolo	+ 11' 36"
3	Luis Vicente Otin (ESP)	Hueso	s.t.
4	Eduardo Chozas (ESP)	Zor–Helios–Gemeaz Cusin	s.t.
5	Benny Van Brabant (BEL)	Splendor–Wickes Bouwmarkt	+ 13' 21"
6	Jean-Philippe Vandenbrande (BEL)	Splendor–Wickes Bouwmarkt	s.t.
7	Pierre-Raymond Villemiane (FRA)	Wolber–Spidel	s.t.
8	Reimund Dietzen (FRG)	Puch–Eorotex–Campagnolo	s.t.
9	Eddy Planckaert (BEL)	Splendor–Wickes Bouwmarkt	s.t.
10	Federico Echave (ESP)	Teka	s.t.

General classification after Stage 13

Rank	Rider	Team	Time
1	Ángel Arroyo (ESP)	Reynolds	
2	Sven-Åke Nilsson (SWE)	Wolber–Spidel	+ 12"
3	Claude Criquielion (BEL)	Splendor–Wickes Bouwmarkt	+ 17"
4	Marino Lejarreta (ESP)	Teka	+ 40"
5	Enrique Martínez Heredia (ESP)	Kelme–Merckx	+ 43"
6	José Luis Laguía (ESP)	Reynolds	+ 46"
7	Alberto Fernández (ESP)	Teka	+ 1' 24"
8	Michel Pollentier (BEL)	Safir–Marc	+ 1' 29"
9	Faustino Rupérez (ESP)	Zor–Helios–Gemeaz Cusin	+ 1' 45"
10	Pierre-Raymond Villemiane (FRA)	Wolber–Spidel	+ 2' 05"

== Stage 14 ==
4 May 1982 — Antella to Albacete, 153 km (95 mi)

Stage 14 result

Rank	Rider	Team	Time
1	Dominique Arnaud (FRA)	Wolber–Spidel	4h 30' 39"
2	Celestino Prieto (ESP)	Kelme–Merckx	s.t.
3	Bernardo Alfonsel (ESP)	Teka	s.t.
4	Hans Neumayer (FRG)	Puch–Eorotex–Campagnolo	s.t.
5	Eddy Van Hoof (BEL)	Safir–Marc	s.t.
6	Ángel Camarillo (ESP)	Zor–Helios–Gemeaz Cusin	s.t.
7	Jesús Hernández Úbeda (ESP)	Reynolds	s.t.
8	Luis Vicente Otin (ESP)	Hueso	+ 2"
9	Philippe Poissonnier (FRA)	Safir–Marc	+ 6"
10	Jean-François Rault (FRA)	Wolber–Spidel	+ 1' 41"

General classification after Stage 14

Rank	Rider	Team	Time
1	Ángel Arroyo (ESP)	Reynolds	75h 07' 43"
2	Sven-Åke Nilsson (SWE)	Wolber–Spidel	+ 12"
3	Claude Criquielion (BEL)	Splendor–Wickes Bouwmarkt	+ 17"
4	Marino Lejarreta (ESP)	Teka	+ 40"
5	Enrique Martínez Heredia (ESP)	Kelme–Merckx	+ 43"
6	José Luis Laguía (ESP)	Reynolds	+ 46"
7	Alberto Fernández (ESP)	Teka	+ 1' 24"
8	Michel Pollentier (BEL)	Safir–Marc	+ 1' 29"
9	Faustino Rupérez (ESP)	Zor–Helios–Gemeaz Cusin	+ 1' 45"
10	Pierre-Raymond Villemiane (FRA)	Wolber–Spidel	+ 2' 06"

== Stage 15a ==
5 May 1982 — Albacete to Tomelloso, 119 km (74 mi)

Stage 15a result

Rank	Rider	Team	Time
1	Eddy Vanhaerens (BEL)	Safir–Marc	3h 22' 05"
2	Eddy Planckaert (BEL)	Splendor–Wickes Bouwmarkt	s.t.
3	Benny Schepmans (BEL)	Van de Ven-Moser	s.t.
4	Jean-François Rault (FRA)	Wolber–Spidel	s.t.
5	Johan Louwet (BEL)	Safir–Marc	s.t.

General classification after Stage 15a

Rank	Rider	Team	Time
1	Ángel Arroyo (ESP)	Reynolds	
2	Sven-Åke Nilsson (SWE)	Wolber–Spidel	+ 12"
3	Claude Criquielion (BEL)	Splendor–Wickes Bouwmarkt	+ 17"

== Stage 15b ==
5 May 1982 — Tomelloso to Campo de Criptana, 35 km (22 mi) (ITT)

Stage 15b result

Rank	Rider	Team	Time
1	Ángel Arroyo (ESP)	Reynolds	49' 44"
2	Julián Gorospe (ESP)	Reynolds	+ 4"
3	Roy Schuiten (NED)	Kelme–Merckx	+ 23"
4	Michel Pollentier (BEL)	Safir–Marc	s.t.
5	Alberto Fernández (ESP)	Teka	+ 24"
6	Juan-Carlos Alonso (ESP)	Teka	+ 45"
7	Jo Maas (NED)	Splendor–Wickes Bouwmarkt	+ 59"
8	Marc Gomez (FRA)	Wolber–Spidel	+ 1' 05"
9	Johnny Broers (NED)	Splendor–Wickes Bouwmarkt	+ 1' 14"
10	Marino Lejarreta (ESP)	Teka	+ 1' 15"

General classification after Stage 15b

Rank	Rider	Team	Time
1	Ángel Arroyo (ESP)	Reynolds	79h 19' 32"
2	Alberto Fernández (ESP)	Teka	+ 1' 48"
3	Michel Pollentier (BEL)	Safir–Marc	+ 1' 52"
4	Marino Lejarreta (ESP)	Teka	+ 1' 55"
5	Claude Criquielion (BEL)	Splendor–Wickes Bouwmarkt	+ 2' 02"
6	Sven-Åke Nilsson (SWE)	Wolber–Spidel	+ 2' 24"
7	Enrique Martínez Heredia (ESP)	Kelme–Merckx	+ 3' 27"
8	Faustino Rupérez (ESP)	Zor–Helios–Gemeaz Cusin	+ 3' 58"
9	Marc Durant (FRA)	Wolber–Spidel	+ 4' 03"
10	Pierre-Raymond Villemiane (FRA)	Wolber–Spidel	+ 4' 06"

== Stage 16 ==
6 May 1982 — Campo de Criptana to San Fernando de Henares, 176 km (109 mi)

Stage 16 result

Rank	Rider	Team	Time
1	Willy Sprangers (BEL)	Safir–Marc	5h 06' 34"
2	Erwin Lienhard (SUI)	Puch–Eorotex–Campagnolo	+ 1"
3	Eddy Planckaert (BEL)	Splendor–Wickes Bouwmarkt	+ 3"
4	Jean-François Rault (FRA)	Wolber–Spidel	s.t.
5	Eddy Vanhaerens (BEL)	Safir–Marc	s.t.
6	Johan Louwet (BEL)	Safir–Marc	s.t.
7	Benny Van Brabant (BEL)	Splendor–Wickes Bouwmarkt	s.t.
8	Benny Schepmans (BEL)	Van de Ven-Moser	s.t.
9	Marc Gomez (FRA)	Wolber–Spidel	s.t.
10	Stefan Mutter (SUI)	Puch–Eorotex–Campagnolo	s.t.

General classification after Stage 16

Rank	Rider	Team	Time
1	Ángel Arroyo (ESP)	Reynolds	84h 26' 09"
2	Alberto Fernández (ESP)	Teka	+ 1' 48"
3	Michel Pollentier (BEL)	Safir–Marc	+ 1' 52"
4	Marino Lejarreta (ESP)	Teka	+ 2' 00"
5	Claude Criquielion (BEL)	Splendor–Wickes Bouwmarkt	+ 2' 02"
6	Sven-Åke Nilsson (SWE)	Wolber–Spidel	+ 2' 24"
7	Enrique Martínez Heredia (ESP)	Kelme–Merckx	+ 3' 27"
8	Faustino Rupérez (ESP)	Zor–Helios–Gemeaz Cusin	+ 3' 58"
9	Marc Durant (FRA)	Wolber–Spidel	+ 4' 03"
10	Pierre-Raymond Villemiane (FRA)	Wolber–Spidel	+ 4' 06"

== Stage 17 ==
7 May 1982 — San Fernando de Henares to Navacerrada, 178 km (111 mi)

Stage 17 result

Rank	Rider	Team	Time
1	Pedro Muñoz Machín Rodríguez (ESP)	Zor–Helios–Gemeaz Cusin	4h 59' 48"
2	Vicente Belda (ESP)	Kelme–Merckx	+ 12"
3	Ángel Arroyo (ESP)	Reynolds	+ 22"
4	Marino Lejarreta (ESP)	Teka	s.t.
5	Alberto Fernández (ESP)	Teka	+ 31"
6	Faustino Rupérez (ESP)	Zor–Helios–Gemeaz Cusin	+ 33"
7	José Luis Laguía (ESP)	Reynolds	+ 38"
8	Michel Pollentier (BEL)	Safir–Marc	+ 43"
9	Jo Maas (NED)	Splendor–Wickes Bouwmarkt	+ 45"
10	Stefan Mutter (SUI)	Puch–Eorotex–Campagnolo	+ 52"

General classification after Stage 17

Rank	Rider	Team	Time
1	Ángel Arroyo (ESP)	Reynolds	89h 26' 19"
2	Marino Lejarreta (ESP)	Teka	+ 1' 55"
3	Alberto Fernández (ESP)	Teka	+ 1' 56"
4	Michel Pollentier (BEL)	Safir–Marc	+ 2' 13"
5	Sven-Åke Nilsson (SWE)	Wolber–Spidel	+ 3' 12"
6	Claude Criquielion (BEL)	Splendor–Wickes Bouwmarkt	+ 3' 29"
7	Faustino Rupérez (ESP)	Zor–Helios–Gemeaz Cusin	+ 4' 09"
8	José Luis Laguía (ESP)	Reynolds	+ 4' 32"
9	Pierre-Raymond Villemiane (FRA)	Wolber–Spidel	+ 4' 34"
10	Marc Durant (FRA)	Wolber–Spidel	+ 5' 18"

== Stage 18 ==
8 May 1982 — Palazuelos de Eresma (Destilerías DYC) to Palazuelos de Eresma (Destilerías DYC), 184 km (114 mi)

Stage 18 result

Rank	Rider	Team	Time
1	Juan Fernández Martín (ESP)	Kelme–Merckx	4h 30' 06"
2	Pierre-Raymond Villemiane (FRA)	Wolber–Spidel	s.t.
3	Michel Pollentier (BEL)	Safir–Marc	s.t.
4	Marino Lejarreta (ESP)	Teka	s.t.
5	Sven-Åke Nilsson (SWE)	Wolber–Spidel	s.t.

General classification after Stage 18

Rank	Rider	Team	Time
1	Ángel Arroyo (ESP)	Reynolds	93h 56' 25"
2	Marino Lejarreta (ESP)	Teka	+ 1' 55"
3	Alberto Fernández (ESP)	Teka	+ 1' 57"
4	Michel Pollentier (BEL)	Safir–Marc	+ 2' 13"
5	Sven-Åke Nilsson (SWE)	Wolber–Spidel	+ 3' 12"
6	Faustino Rupérez (ESP)	Zor–Helios–Gemeaz Cusin	+ 4' 09"
7	José Luis Laguía (ESP)	Reynolds	+ 4' 32"
8	Pierre-Raymond Villemiane (FRA)	Wolber–Spidel	+ 4' 38"
9	Stefan Mutter (SUI)	Puch–Eorotex–Campagnolo	+ 6' 13"
10	Jaime Vilamajó (ESP)	Kelme–Merckx	+ 6' 14"

== Stage 19 ==
9 May 1982 — Madrid to Madrid, 84 km (52 mi)

Stage 19 result

Rank	Rider	Team	Time
1	Eddy Vanhaerens (BEL)	Safir–Marc	1h 49' 03"
2	Johan Louwet (BEL)	Safir–Marc	s.t.
3	Eddy Van Hoof (BEL)	Safir–Marc	s.t.
4	Benny Schepmans (BEL)	Van de Ven-Moser	s.t.
5	Walter Planckaert (BEL)	Splendor–Wickes Bouwmarkt	s.t.
6	Juan Fernández Martín (ESP)	Kelme–Merckx	s.t.
7	Stefan Mutter (SUI)	Puch–Eorotex–Campagnolo	s.t.
8	Benny Van Brabant (BEL)	Splendor–Wickes Bouwmarkt	s.t.
9	Jean-Philippe Vandenbrande (BEL)	Splendor–Wickes Bouwmarkt	s.t.
10	Jesús Suárez Cueva (ESP)	Reynolds	s.t.

General classification after Stage 19

Rank	Rider	Team	Time
1	Ángel Arroyo (ESP)	Reynolds	95h 45' 28"
2	Marino Lejarreta (ESP)	Teka	+ 1' 55"
3	Alberto Fernández (ESP)	Teka	+ 1' 57"
4	Michel Pollentier (BEL)	Safir–Marc	+ 2' 13"
5	Sven-Åke Nilsson (SWE)	Wolber–Spidel	+ 3' 12"
6	Faustino Rupérez (ESP)	Zor–Helios–Gemeaz Cusin	+ 4' 09"
7	José Luis Laguía (ESP)	Reynolds	+ 4' 32"
8	Pierre-Raymond Villemiane (FRA)	Wolber–Spidel	+ 4' 38"
9	Stefan Mutter (SUI)	Puch–Eorotex–Campagnolo	+ 6' 13"
10	Jaime Vilamajó (ESP)	Kelme–Merckx	+ 6' 14"
