= 1982 Vuelta a España, Prologue to Stage 9 =

Cycling race stages

The 1982 Vuelta a España was the 37th edition of the Vuelta a España, one of cycling's Grand Tours. The Vuelta began in Santiago de Compostela, with a prologue individual time trial on 20 April, and Stage 9 occurred on 29 April with a stage to Puigcerdà. The race finished in Madrid on 9 May.

== Prologue ==
20 April 1982 — Santiago de Compostela to Santiago de Compostela, 6.7 km (4.2 mi) (ITT)

Prologue result and general classification after Prologue

Rank	Rider	Team	Time
1	Marc Gomez (FRA)	Wolber–Spidel	8' 52"
2	Eulalio García (ESP)	Reynolds	+ 2"
3	Paul Wellens (BEL)	Splendor–Wickes Bouwmarkt	+ 7"
4	Julián Gorospe (ESP)	Reynolds	s.t.
5	Claude Criquielion (BEL)	Splendor–Wickes Bouwmarkt	+ 8"
6	Pedro Muñoz Machín Rodríguez (ESP)	Zor–Helios–Gemeaz Cusin	+ 9"
7	Marc Durant (FRA)	Wolber–Spidel	+ 10"
8	Roy Schuiten (NED)	Kelme–Merckx	s.t.
9	Pedro Delgado (ESP)	Reynolds	+ 11"
10	Stefan Mutter (SUI)	Puch–Eorotex–Campagnolo	s.t.

== Stage 1a ==
21 April 1982 — Santiago de Compostela to A Coruña, 97 km (60 mi)

Stage 1a result

Rank	Rider	Team	Time
1	Eddy Planckaert (BEL)	Splendor–Wickes Bouwmarkt	2h 43' 08"
2	Dirk Heirweg (BEL)	Van de Ven-Moser	s.t.
3	Eddy Vanhaerens (BEL)	Safir–Marc	s.t.
4	Stefan Mutter (SUI)	Puch–Eorotex–Campagnolo	s.t.
5	Marc Gomez (FRA)	Wolber–Spidel	s.t.

General classification after Stage 1a

Rank	Rider	Team	Time
1	Marc Gomez (FRA)	Wolber–Spidel	
2	Eulalio García (ESP)	Reynolds	+ 2"
3	Paul Wellens (BEL)	Splendor–Wickes Bouwmarkt	+ 7"

== Stage 1b ==
21 April 1982 — A Coruña to Lugo, 97 km (60 mi)

Stage 1b result

Rank	Rider	Team	Time
1	Eddy Planckaert (BEL)	Splendor–Wickes Bouwmarkt	2h 39' 22"
2	Eddy Vanhaerens (BEL)	Safir–Marc	s.t.
3	Dirk Heirweg (BEL)	Van de Ven-Moser	s.t.
4	Johan Louwet (BEL)	Safir–Marc	s.t.
5	Jesús Suárez Cueva (ESP)	Reynolds	s.t.
6	Federico Echave (ESP)	Teka	s.t.
7	Francisco Javier Cedena (ESP)	Zor–Helios–Gemeaz Cusin	s.t.
8	Jean-Philippe Vandenbrande (BEL)	Splendor–Wickes Bouwmarkt	s.t.
9	Juan Fernández Martín (ESP)	Kelme–Merckx	s.t.

General classification after Stage 1b

Rank	Rider	Team	Time
1	Marc Gomez (FRA)	Wolber–Spidel	5h 31' 22"
2	Eulalio García (ESP)	Reynolds	+ 2"
3	Paul Wellens (BEL)	Splendor–Wickes Bouwmarkt	+ 7"
4	Julián Gorospe (ESP)	Reynolds	s.t.
5	Claude Criquielion (BEL)	Splendor–Wickes Bouwmarkt	+ 8"
6	Marc Durant (FRA)	Wolber–Spidel	+ 9"
7	Roy Schuiten (NED)	Kelme–Merckx	s.t.
8	Pedro Muñoz Machín Rodríguez (ESP)	Zor–Helios–Gemeaz Cusin	s.t.
9	Stefan Mutter (SUI)	Puch–Eorotex–Campagnolo	+ 10"
10	Pedro Delgado (ESP)	Reynolds	s.t.

== Stage 2 ==
22 April 1982 — Lugo to Gijón, 240 km (150 mi)

Stage 2 result

Rank	Rider	Team	Time
1	Eddy Planckaert (BEL)	Splendor–Wickes Bouwmarkt	7h 31' 13"
2	Eddy Vanhaerens (BEL)	Safir–Marc	s.t.
3	Marc Gomez (FRA)	Wolber–Spidel	s.t.
4	Stefan Mutter (SUI)	Puch–Eorotex–Campagnolo	s.t.
5	Jesús Suárez Cueva (ESP)	Reynolds	s.t.
6=	Juan Fernández Martín (ESP)	Kelme–Merckx	s.t.
6=	Jesús Guzmán Delgado (ESP)	Kelme–Merckx	s.t.
6=	Jaime Vilamajó (ESP)	Kelme–Merckx	s.t.
6=	Pedro Muñoz Machín Rodríguez (ESP)	Zor–Helios–Gemeaz Cusin	s.t.
6=	José Viejo (ESP)	Zor–Helios–Gemeaz Cusin	s.t.

General classification after Stage 2

Rank	Rider	Team	Time
1	Marc Gomez (FRA)	Wolber–Spidel	13h 07' 36"
2	Eulalio García (ESP)	Reynolds	+ 1"
3	Paul Wellens (BEL)	Splendor–Wickes Bouwmarkt	+ 6"
4	Julián Gorospe (ESP)	Reynolds	s.t.
5	Claude Criquielion (BEL)	Splendor–Wickes Bouwmarkt	+ 7"
6	Roy Schuiten (NED)	Kelme–Merckx	+ 11"
7	Marc Durant (FRA)	Wolber–Spidel	s.t.
8	Pedro Muñoz Machín Rodríguez (ESP)	Zor–Helios–Gemeaz Cusin	s.t.
9	Stefan Mutter (SUI)	Puch–Eorotex–Campagnolo	+ 13"
10	Pedro Delgado (ESP)	Reynolds	s.t.

== Stage 3 ==
23 April 1982 — Gijón to Santander, 208 km (129 mi)

Stage 3 result

Rank	Rider	Team	Time
1	Eddy Planckaert (BEL)	Splendor–Wickes Bouwmarkt	6h 12' 50"
2	Stefan Mutter (SUI)	Puch–Eorotex–Campagnolo	s.t.
3	Marc Gomez (FRA)	Wolber–Spidel	s.t.
4	Eulalio García (ESP)	Reynolds	s.t.
5	Eddy Vanhaerens (BEL)	Safir–Marc	s.t.
6	Benny Schepmans (BEL)	Van de Ven-Moser	s.t.
7	Marc Van Geel (BEL)	Safir–Marc	s.t.
8	Jaime Vilamajó (ESP)	Kelme–Merckx	s.t.
9	Alain Desaever (BEL)	Safir–Marc	s.t.
10	Dirk Heirweg (BEL)	Van de Ven-Moser	s.t.

General classification after Stage 3

Rank	Rider	Team	Time
1	Marc Gomez (FRA)	Wolber–Spidel	19h 15' 25"
2	Eulalio García (ESP)	Reynolds	+ 2"
3	Paul Wellens (BEL)	Splendor–Wickes Bouwmarkt	+ 7"
4	Julián Gorospe (ESP)	Reynolds	s.t.
5	Claude Criquielion (BEL)	Splendor–Wickes Bouwmarkt	+ 8"
6	Marc Durant (FRA)	Wolber–Spidel	+ 9"
7	Roy Schuiten (NED)	Kelme–Merckx	s.t.
8	Pedro Muñoz Machín Rodríguez (ESP)	Zor–Helios–Gemeaz Cusin	s.t.
9	Stefan Mutter (SUI)	Puch–Eorotex–Campagnolo	+ 10"
10	Pedro Delgado (ESP)	Reynolds	s.t.

== Stage 4 ==
24 April 1982 — Santander to Reinosa, 196 km (122 mi)

Stage 4 result

Rank	Rider	Team	Time
1	Antonio Coll (ESP)	Teka	5h 56' 13"
2	Claude Criquielion (BEL)	Splendor–Wickes Bouwmarkt	s.t.
3	Ángel Arroyo (ESP)	Reynolds	s.t.
4	Ismael Lejarreta (ESP)	Teka	+ 1"
5	Alberto Fernández (ESP)	Teka	s.t.
6	Faustino Rupérez (ESP)	Zor–Helios–Gemeaz Cusin	+ 25"
7	José Luis Laguía (ESP)	Reynolds	s.t.
8	Vicente Belda (ESP)	Kelme–Merckx	s.t.
9	Benny Van Brabant (BEL)	Splendor–Wickes Bouwmarkt	+ 45"
10	Eulalio García (ESP)	Reynolds	s.t.

General classification after Stage 4

Rank	Rider	Team	Time
1	Claude Criquielion (BEL)	Splendor–Wickes Bouwmarkt	25h 11' 46"
2	Ángel Arroyo (ESP)	Reynolds	+ 7"
3	Alberto Fernández (ESP)	Teka	+ 9"
4	Marino Lejarreta (ESP)	Teka	+ 16"
5	Antonio Coll (ESP)	Teka	+ 17"
6	José Luis Laguía (ESP)	Reynolds	+ 32"
7	Faustino Rupérez (ESP)	Zor–Helios–Gemeaz Cusin	+ 36"
8	Eulalio García (ESP)	Reynolds	+ 39"
9	Paul Wellens (BEL)	Splendor–Wickes Bouwmarkt	+ 44"
10	Marc Durant (FRA)	Wolber–Spidel	+ 46"

== Stage 5 ==
25 April 1982 — Reinosa to Logroño, 230 km (140 mi)

Stage 5 result

Rank	Rider	Team	Time
1	Ángel Camarillo (ESP)	Zor–Helios–Gemeaz Cusin	6h 10' 39"
2	Eddy Planckaert (BEL)	Splendor–Wickes Bouwmarkt	+ 1' 28"
3	Benny Schepmans (BEL)	Van de Ven-Moser	s.t.
4	Benny Van Brabant (BEL)	Splendor–Wickes Bouwmarkt	s.t.
5	Johan Louwet (BEL)	Safir–Marc	s.t.
6	Stefan Mutter (SUI)	Puch–Eorotex–Campagnolo	s.t.
7	Eddy Vanhaerens (BEL)	Safir–Marc	s.t.
8	Juan Fernández Martín (ESP)	Kelme–Merckx	s.t.

General classification after Stage 5

Rank	Rider	Team	Time
1	Claude Criquielion (BEL)	Splendor–Wickes Bouwmarkt	31h 23' 53"
2	Ángel Arroyo (ESP)	Reynolds	+ 7"
3	Alberto Fernández (ESP)	Teka	+ 9"
4	Marino Lejarreta (ESP)	Teka	+ 16"
5	Antonio Coll (ESP)	Teka	+ 17"
6	José Luis Laguía (ESP)	Reynolds	+ 32"
7	Faustino Rupérez (ESP)	Zor–Helios–Gemeaz Cusin	+ 36"
8	Eulalio García (ESP)	Reynolds	+ 39"
9	Paul Wellens (BEL)	Splendor–Wickes Bouwmarkt	+ 44"
10	Marc Durant (FRA)	Wolber–Spidel	+ 46"

== Stage 6 ==
26 April 1982 — Logroño to Zaragoza, 190 km (120 mi)

Stage 6 result

Rank	Rider	Team	Time
1	José Luis Laguía (ESP)	Reynolds	4h 57' 33"
2	Benny Van Brabant (BEL)	Splendor–Wickes Bouwmarkt	s.t.
3	Claude Criquielion (BEL)	Splendor–Wickes Bouwmarkt	s.t.
4	Eddy Planckaert (BEL)	Splendor–Wickes Bouwmarkt	s.t.
5	Juan Fernández Martín (ESP)	Kelme–Merckx	s.t.
6	Vicente Belda (ESP)	Kelme–Merckx	s.t.
7	Stefan Mutter (SUI)	Puch–Eorotex–Campagnolo	s.t.

General classification after Stage 6

Rank	Rider	Team	Time
1	Claude Criquielion (BEL)	Splendor–Wickes Bouwmarkt	
2	Ángel Arroyo (ESP)	Reynolds	+ 19"
3	Alberto Fernández (ESP)	Teka	+ 21"
4	Marino Lejarreta (ESP)	Teka	+ 28"
5	Antonio Coll (ESP)	Teka	+ 29"
6	José Luis Laguía (ESP)	Reynolds	+ 32"
7	Faustino Rupérez (ESP)	Zor–Helios–Gemeaz Cusin	+ 48"
8	Eulalio García (ESP)	Reynolds	+ 51"
9	Paul Wellens (BEL)	Splendor–Wickes Bouwmarkt	+ 56"
10	Stefan Mutter (SUI)	Puch–Eorotex–Campagnolo	+ 59"

== Stage 7 ==
27 April 1982 — Zaragoza to Sabiñánigo, 146 km (91 mi)

Stage 7 result

Rank	Rider	Team	Time
1	Enrique Martínez Heredia (ESP)	Kelme–Merckx	3h 38' 09"
2	Eddy Planckaert (BEL)	Splendor–Wickes Bouwmarkt	+ 57"
3	Pierre-Raymond Villemiane (FRA)	Wolber–Spidel	s.t.
4	Stefan Mutter (SUI)	Puch–Eorotex–Campagnolo	s.t.
5	Marc Gomez (FRA)	Wolber–Spidel	s.t.
6	Juan Fernández Martín (ESP)	Kelme–Merckx	s.t.
7	Reimund Dietzen (FRG)	Puch–Eorotex–Campagnolo	s.t.
8	Benny Van Brabant (BEL)	Splendor–Wickes Bouwmarkt	s.t.
9	Harald Maier (AUT)	Puch–Eorotex–Campagnolo	s.t.
10	Michel Pollentier (BEL)	Safir–Marc	s.t.

General classification after Stage 7

Rank	Rider	Team	Time
1	Claude Criquielion (BEL)	Splendor–Wickes Bouwmarkt	40h 00' 32"
2	Enrique Martínez Heredia (ESP)	Kelme–Merckx	+ 11"
3	Ángel Arroyo (ESP)	Reynolds	+ 14"
4	Alberto Fernández (ESP)	Teka	+ 16"
5	Marino Lejarreta (ESP)	Teka	+ 23"
6	Antonio Coll (ESP)	Teka	+ 24"
7	José Luis Laguía (ESP)	Reynolds	+ 32"
8	Faustino Rupérez (ESP)	Zor–Helios–Gemeaz Cusin	+ 43"
9	Paul Wellens (BEL)	Splendor–Wickes Bouwmarkt	+ 49"
10	Stefan Mutter (SUI)	Puch–Eorotex–Campagnolo	+ 52"

== Stage 8 ==
28 April 1982 — Sabiñánigo to Lleida, 216 km (134 mi)

Stage 8 result

Rank	Rider	Team	Time
1	Jesús Hernández Úbeda (ESP)	Reynolds	5h 44' 29"
2	Stefan Mutter (SUI)	Puch–Eorotex–Campagnolo	+ 6' 00"
3	Eddy Planckaert (BEL)	Splendor–Wickes Bouwmarkt	s.t.
4	Jean-François Rault (FRA)	Wolber–Spidel	s.t.
5	Benny Schepmans (BEL)	Van de Ven-Moser	s.t.
6	Eddy Vanhaerens (BEL)	Safir–Marc	s.t.
7	Jean-Philippe Vandenbrande (BEL)	Splendor–Wickes Bouwmarkt	s.t.
8	Enrique Martínez Heredia (ESP)	Kelme–Merckx	s.t.
9	Eddy Van Hoof (BEL)	Safir–Marc	s.t.

General classification after Stage 8

Rank	Rider	Team	Time
1	Claude Criquielion (BEL)	Splendor–Wickes Bouwmarkt	45h 51' 01"
2	Enrique Martínez Heredia (ESP)	Kelme–Merckx	+ 11"
3	Ángel Arroyo (ESP)	Reynolds	+ 14"
4	Alberto Fernández (ESP)	Teka	+ 16"
5	Marino Lejarreta (ESP)	Teka	+ 23"
6	Antonio Coll (ESP)	Teka	+ 24"
7	José Luis Laguía (ESP)	Reynolds	+ 32"
8	Faustino Rupérez (ESP)	Zor–Helios–Gemeaz Cusin	+ 43"
9	Paul Wellens (BEL)	Splendor–Wickes Bouwmarkt	+ 51"
10	Stefan Mutter (SUI)	Puch–Eorotex–Campagnolo	+ 54"

== Stage 9 ==
29 April 1982 — Artesa de Segre to Puigcerdà, 182 km (113 mi)

Stage 9 result

Rank	Rider	Team	Time
1	Hugues Grondin (FRA)	Hueso	5h 25' 24"
2	José Luis Laguía (ESP)	Reynolds	+ 54"
3			s.t.

General classification after Stage 9

Rank	Rider	Team	Time
1	Claude Criquielion (BEL)	Splendor–Wickes Bouwmarkt	51h 17' 19"
2	Enrique Martínez Heredia (ESP)	Kelme–Merckx	+ 11"
3	Ángel Arroyo (ESP)	Reynolds	+ 14"
4	Alberto Fernández (ESP)	Teka	+ 16"
5	Marino Lejarreta (ESP)	Teka	+ 23"
6	Antonio Coll (ESP)	Teka	+ 24"
7	José Luis Laguía (ESP)	Reynolds	+ 32"
8	Faustino Rupérez (ESP)	Zor–Helios–Gemeaz Cusin	+ 43"
9	Paul Wellens (BEL)	Splendor–Wickes Bouwmarkt	+ 51"
10	Eduardo Chozas (ESP)	Zor–Helios–Gemeaz Cusin	+ 1' 03"
