= List of former Movistar riders =

This article is a list of riders who have ridden for what is now the UCI team code: MOV. The team began in 1980 as Team Reynolds.

== Reynolds (1980–1989) ==
- Miguel Acha
- Dominique Arnaud
- Juan Maria Azcarate
- Gert Frank
- Anastasio Greciano
- Vicente Iza
- José Luis Laguía
- Ángel López Del Alamo
- Francisco Javier López Izcue
- Juan Martín Ocaña
- Hector-Raoul Rondan
- Jesus Maria Segura
- Carlos Hernández Bailo
- Jesús Hernández Úbeda
- Luis Vicente Otin
- Juan-Jose Quintanilla
- Ricardo Zúñiga
- Ángel Arroyo
- Pedro Delgado
- Eulalio García
- Julián Gorospe
- Rafael Ladrón
- Imanol Murga
- Jesús Suárez Cueva
- Enrique Aja
- José Luis Jaimerena
- Celestino Prieto
- Francis Vermaelen
- Jaime Vilamajó
- Guillermo Arenas
- Alvaro Fernandez Fernandez
- Iñaki Gastón
- Eduardo González Salvador
- Miguel Induráin
- Eduardo Chozas
- Francisco Navarro Fuster
- Rolando Ovando
- Samuel Cabrera
- José Enrique Carrera Alvarez
- Marc Gomez
- Rubén Gorospe
- Stéphane Guay
- Kari Myyryläinen
- Franck Pineau
- Pedro Luis Diaz Zabala
- Herminio Díaz Zabala
- Melcior Mauri
- Ángel Ocaña
- José Fernando Pacheco (cyclist)
- Gabriel Roberto Sabbaio
- Omar Hernández
- Luis Javier Lukin
- William Palacio
- Jesús Rodríguez Magro
- Armand de Las Cuevas
- Juan Carlos González Salvador
- Victor Gonzalo Guiaro

== Riders who rode as Reynolds and then Banesto ==
- Dominique Arnaud
- José Enrique Carrera Alvarez
- Armand de Las Cuevas
- Pedro Delgado
- Jose Fernando Pacheco
- Juan Carlos González Salvador
- Victor Gonzalo Guiaro
- Julián Gorospe
- Rubén Gorospe
- Miguel Induráin
- Luis Javier Lukin
- Jesús Rodríguez Magro
- Melcior Mauri

== Banesto (1990–2003) ==
- Marino Alonso
- Aitor Garmendia
- Jesus-Cruz Martin Perez
- Juan Martínez Oliver
- Jokin Mújika
- José Ramón Uriarte
- Abelardo Rondón
- Francisco Ignacio San Román
- Jose Luis Santamaria Gonzalez
- Jean-François Bernard
- Fabian Fuchs
- Prudencio Induráin
- Javier Lazpiur
- Roberto Lezaun
- José Luis De Santos Arribas
- Fabrice Philipot
- José María Jiménez
- José Luis Arrieta
- Oscar Lopez Uriarte
- Gérard Rué
- Vicente Aparicio
- Ángel Luis Casero
- Santiago Crespo
- David García Marquina
- Ramón González Arrieta
- Stéphane Heulot
- Antonio Martín Velasco
- Carmelo Miranda
- Jesús Montoya
- Erwin Nijboer
- Juan Antonio Zarrabeitia
- Mikel Zarrabeitia
- Santiago Blanco
- Thomas Davy
- José Vicente García Acosta
- Andrew Hampsten
- Jeremy Hunt
- Damien Nazon
- Orlando Sergio Rodrigues
- Miguel Ángel Peña Caceres
- Manuel Beltrán
- Manuel Fernández Ginés
- Abraham Olano
- Aitor Osa
- Unai Osa
- Cândido Barbosa
- David Latasa
- Francisco Mancebo
- David Navas Chica
- Jon Odrioloza
- César Solaun
- Dariusz Baranowski
- Marzio Bruseghin
- Leonardo Piepoli
- Alex Zülle
- Alberto Benito Guerrero
- Tomasz Brożyna
- Denis Menchov
- Xabier Zandio
- Eladio Jiménez Sánchez
- Juan Carlos Domínguez
- Adolfo Garcia
- Koldo Gil
- Patxi Vila
- Juan Miguel Mercado
- Juan Antonio Flecha
- Ivan Gutiérrez
- Rubén Plaza
- Javier Pascal Rodriguez
- Vladimir Karpets
- José Antonio López Gil
- Rafael Mateos

== Riders who rode as Banesto who then rode as Illes Balears ==
- José Vicente García Acosta
- Ivan Gutiérrez
- Vladimir Karpets
- José Antonio López Gil
- José Luis Arrieta
- Francisco Mancebo
- Denis Menchov
- David Navas
- Unai Osa
- Aitor Osa
- Xabier Zandio

== Illes Balears (2004–2005) ==
- Daniel Becke
- Antonio Colom
- Isaac Gálvez
- Joan Horrach
- Mikel Pradera
- Steffen Radochla
- Vicente Reynés
- Toni Tauler
- David Arroyo
- José Luis Carrasco
- Sergio Escobar
- Jonathan Gonzalez Rios
- José Julia
- Iker Leonet
- Francisco Pérez Sanchez

== Riders who rode as Banesto, then Illes Balears and then Caisse d'Epargne ==
- José Vicente García Acosta
- Ivan Gutiérrez
- Vladimir Karpets
- Xabier Zandio

== Riders who rode as Banesto and then returned under the Caisse d'Epargne name ==
- Rubén Plaza
- Marzio Bruseghin

== Riders who rode as Illes Balears and then rode as Caisse d'Epargne ==
- José Vicente García Acosta
- Ivan Gutiérrez
- Vladimir Karpets
- Xabier Zandio
- José Luis Carrasco
- David Arroyo
- Antonio Colom
- Isaac Gálvez
- Joan Horrach
- José Julia
- Iker Leonet
- Francisco Pérez Sanchez
- Mikel Pradera
- Vicente Reynés

== Caisse d'Epargne (2006–2010) ==
- Éric Berthou
- Florent Brard
- Vladimir Efimkin
- Marco Fertonani
- Alexei Markov
- Óscar Pereiro
- Aitor Pérez
- Mathieu Perget
- Nicolas Portal
- Joaquim Rodríguez
- Constantino Zaballa
- David López García
- Alberto Losada
- Luis León Sánchez
- Anthony Charteau
- Arnaud Coyot
- Mathieu Drujon
- Daniel Moreno
- Luis Pasamontes
- Fabrice Pantanchon
- Marlon Pérez Arango
- José Humberto Rujano
- Rigoberto Urán
- Rui Costa
- Arnold Jeannesson
- Vasil Kiryienka
- Ángel Madrazo
- Juan José Cobo
- Christophe Moreau
- Juan Mauricio Soler

== Riders who rode as Banesto, then Illes Balears, then Caisse d'Epargne and then Movistar ==
- José Vicente García Acosta
- Ivan Gutiérrez
- Vladimir Karpets

== Riders who rode as Illes Baleras, then Caisse D'Epargne and then Movistar ==
- José Vicente García Acosta
- Ivan Gutiérrez
- Vladimir Karpets
- David Arroyo
- Francisco Pérez Sanchez

== Riders who rode as Banesto, returned as Caisse D'Epargne and then as Movistar ==
- Rubén Plaza
- Marzio Bruseghin

== Riders who rode as Caisse D'Epargne and then Movistar ==
- David Arroyo
- Marzio Bruseghin
- Rui Costa
- José Vicente García Acosta
- Ivan Gutiérrez
- Vasil Kiryienka
- David Lopez
- Angel Madrazo
- Luis Pasamontes
- Francisco Pérez Sanchez
- Rubén Plaza
- Juan Mauricio Soler
- Vladimir Karpets
- Juan José Cobo
- Andrey Amador

== Movistar Team (2011-) ==
- Javier Iriarte
- Ignatas Konovalovas
- Carlos Oyarzun
- Sergio Pardilla
- Branislau Samoilau
- Xavier Tondo
- Argiro Ospina
- Eloy Tereul
- Sylwester Szmyd
- Jonathan Castroviejo
- Nairo Quintana
- Richard Carapaz
- Miguel Ángel López (cyclist)
