= 1981 GP Ouest-France =

Race details
- Dates: 24 August 1981
- Stages: 1
- Distance: 198 km (123.0 mi)
- Winning time: 4h 48' 28"

Results
	Winner	Gilbert Duclos-Lassalle (FRA)	(Peugeot–Esso–Michelin)
	Second	Dominique Arnaud (FRA)	(Puch–Wolber–Campagnolo)
	Third	Jacques Martin (BEL)	(Fangio–Sapeco–Mavic)

The 1981 GP Ouest-France was the 45th edition of the GP Ouest-France cycle race and was held on 24 August 1981. The race started and finished in Plouay. The race was won by Gilbert Duclos-Lassalle of the Peugeot team.

== General classification ==
Final general classification

Rank	Rider	Team	Time
1	Gilbert Duclos-Lassalle (FRA)	Peugeot–Esso–Michelin	4h 48' 28"
2	Dominique Arnaud (FRA)	Puch–Wolber–Campagnolo	+ 58"
3	Jacques Martin (BEL)	Fangio–Sapeco–Mavic	+ 58"
4	Francis Castaing (FRA)	Peugeot–Esso–Michelin	+ 1' 35"
5	Régis Ovion (FRA)	Puch–Wolber–Campagnolo	+ 1' 35"
6	Maurice Le Guilloux (FRA)	Renault–Elf–Gitane	+ 1' 35"
7	Pierre Bazzo (FRA)	La Redoute–Motobécane	+ 1' 35"
8	Patrick Friou (FRA)	Miko–Mercier–Vivagel	+ 1' 35"
9	André Chalmel (FRA)	Peugeot–Esso–Michelin	+ 1' 35"
10	Marc Madiot (FRA)	Renault–Elf–Gitane	+ 1' 35"
