= 1982 Liège–Bastogne–Liège =

Race details
- Dates: 11 April 1982
- Stages: 1
- Distance: 244.7 km (152.0 mi)
- Winning time: 6h 56' 00"

Results
| | Winner | Silvano Contini (ITA) | (Bianchi–Piaggio) |
| | Second | Alfons De Wolf (BEL) | (Vermeer Thijs) |
| | Third | Stefan Mutter (SUI) | (Puch–Eorotex–Campagnolo) |

The 1982 Liège–Bastogne–Liège was the 68th edition of the Liège–Bastogne–Liège cycle race and was held on 11 April 1982. The race started and finished in Liège. The race was won by Silvano Contini of the Bianchi team.

== General classification ==
Final general classification

| Rank | Rider | Team | Time |
|---|---|---|---|
| 1 | Silvano Contini (ITA) | Bianchi–Piaggio | 6h 56' 00" |
| 2 | Alfons De Wolf (BEL) | Vermeer Thijs | + 0" |
| 3 | Stefan Mutter (SUI) | Puch–Eorotex–Campagnolo | + 0" |
| 4 | Claude Criquielion (BEL) | Splendor–Wickes Bouwmarkt | + 0" |
| 5 | Tommy Prim (SWE) | Bianchi–Piaggio | + 24" |
| 6 | Johan van der Velde (NED) | TI–Raleigh–Campagnolo | + 24" |
| 7 | Roger De Vlaeminck (BEL) | DAF Trucks–TeVe Blad | + 24" |
| 8 | Jean-Marie Grezet (SUI) | Cilo–Aufina | + 24" |
| 9 | Stephen Roche (IRL) | Peugeot–Shell–Michelin | + 24" |
| 10 | Sean Kelly (IRL) | Sem–France Loire–Campagnolo | + 24" |
