= 1980 Paris–Nice =

Race details
- Dates: 5–12 March 1980
- Stages: 7 + Prologue
- Distance: 1,037 km (644.4 mi)
- Winning time: 28h 29' 48"

Results
Jersey awarded to the overall winner	Winner	Gilbert Duclos-Lassalle (FRA)	(Peugeot–Esso–Michelin)
	Second	Stefan Mutter (SUI)	(TI–Raleigh–Creda)
	Third	Gerrie Knetemann (NED)	(TI–Raleigh–Creda)

The 1980 Paris–Nice was the 38th edition of the Paris–Nice cycle race and was held from 5 March to 12 March 1980. The race started in Issy-les-Moulineaux and finished at the Col d'Èze. The race was won by Gilbert Duclos-Lassalle of the Peugeot team.

== General classification ==
Final general classification

Rank	Rider	Team	Time
1	Gilbert Duclos-Lassalle (FRA)	Peugeot–Esso–Michelin	28h 29' 48"
2	Stefan Mutter (SUI)	TI–Raleigh–Creda	+ 3' 02"
3	Gerrie Knetemann (NED)	TI–Raleigh–Creda	+ 3' 46"
4	Tommy Prim (SWE)	Bianchi–Piaggio	+ 4' 04"
5	Silvano Contini (ITA)	Bianchi–Piaggio	+ 4' 50"
6	Knut Knudsen (NOR)	Bianchi–Piaggio	+ 5' 09"
7	Henk Lubberding (NED)	TI–Raleigh–Creda	+ 5' 46"
8	Jean-Luc Vandenbroucke (BEL)	La Redoute–Motobécane	+ 6' 36"
9	Pierre Bazzo (FRA)	La Redoute–Motobécane	+ 7' 17"
10	Sven-Åke Nilsson (SWE)	Miko–Mercier–Vivagel	+ 7' 24"
