= José Pacheco =

José Pacheco may refer to:

- José Francisco Pacheco (born 1951), Portuguese educator
- José Emilio Pacheco (1939–2014), Mexican essayist, novelist and short story writer
- José Condungua Pacheco (born 1958), minister of the interior of Mozambique
- José Fernando Pacheco (ornithologist), Brazilian ornithologist, see Yellow-faced parrot
- José Fernando Pacheco (cyclist), see List of former Movistar riders
- José Pacheco (cyclist) (born 1942), Olympic Portuguese cyclist
- José Pacheko (1885–1934), Portuguese architect and artist
- José Pacheco (Portuguese politician) (born 1971), Portuguese politician
