= 1983 GP Ouest-France =

Race details
- Dates: 23 August 1983
- Stages: 1
- Distance: 225 km (139.8 mi)
- Winning time: 5h 25' 30"

Results
	Winner	Pierre Bazzo (FRA)	(COOP–Mercier–Mavic)
	Second	Marc Madiot (FRA)	(Renault–Elf)
	Third	Stephen Roche (IRL)	(Peugeot–Shell–Michelin)

The 1983 GP Ouest-France was the 47th edition of the GP Ouest-France cycle race and was held on 23 August 1983. The race started and finished in Plouay. The race was won by Pierre Bazzo of the COOP–Mercier team.

== General classification ==
Final general classification

Rank	Rider	Team	Time
1	Pierre Bazzo (FRA)	COOP–Mercier–Mavic	5h 25' 30"
2	Marc Madiot (FRA)	Renault–Elf	+ 3' 01"
3	Stephen Roche (IRL)	Peugeot–Shell–Michelin	+ 3' 13"
4	Pierre-Raymond Villemiane (FRA)	Wolber–Spidel	+ 3' 13"
5	Jean-Louis Gauthier (FRA)	COOP–Mercier–Mavic	+ 3' 48"
6	Dominique Arnaud (FRA)	Wolber–Spidel	+ 3' 48"
7	Christian Corre (FRA)	La Redoute–Motobécane	+ 3' 48"
8	Régis Clère (FRA)	COOP–Mercier–Mavic	+ 3' 48"
9	Jean-François Rault (FRA)	COOP–Mercier–Mavic	+ 4' 18"
10	Pierre Le Bigaut (FRA)	COOP–Mercier–Mavic	+ 4' 18"
