= 1981 Volta a Catalunya =

Race details
- Dates: 3–10 September 1981
- Stages: 7 + Prologue
- Distance: 1,254.5 km (779.5 mi)
- Winning time: 34h 56' 11"

Results
	Winner	Faustino Rupérez (ESP)	(Zor–Helios–Novostil)
	Second	Serge Demierre (SUI)	(Cilo–Aufina)
	Third	Marino Lejarreta (ESP)	(Teka–Campagnolo)
	Points	Johan van der Velde (NED)	(TI–Raleigh–Creda)
	Mountains	Marino Lejarreta (ESP)	(Teka–Campagnolo)
	Sprints	Vicente Belda (ESP)	(Kelme–Gios)
	Team	Zor–Helios–Novostil	

The 1981 Volta a Catalunya was the 61st edition of the Volta a Catalunya cycle race and was held from 3 September to 10 September 1981. The race started in Platja d'Aro and finished at Manresa. The race was won by Faustino Rupérez of the Zor team.

== General classification ==
Final general classification

Rank	Rider	Team	Time
1	Faustino Rupérez (ESP)	Zor–Helios–Novostil	34h 56' 11"
2	Serge Demierre (SUI)	Cilo–Aufina	+ 3' 32"
3	Marino Lejarreta (ESP)	Teka–Campagnolo	+ 12' 22"
4	Johan van der Velde (NED)	TI–Raleigh–Creda	+ 12' 43"
5	Vicente Belda (ESP)	Kelme–Gios	+ 15' 56"
6	Alberto Fernández (ESP)	Teka–Campagnolo	+ 16' 58"
7	Erwin Lienhard (SUI)	Cilo–Aufina	+ 18' 37"
8	Ismael Lejarreta (ESP)	Teka–Campagnolo	+ 18' 39"
9	Jesús Suárez Cueva (ESP)	Kelme–Gios	+ 20' 52"
10	Ricardo Zúñiga (ESP)	Reynolds	+ 21' 24"
