= 1982 Vuelta a España =

Race details
- Dates: 20 April – 9 May
- Stages: 19 + Prologue, including 2 split stages
- Distance: 3,456 km (2,147 mi)
- Winning time: 95h 47' 23"

Results
Jersey awarded to the overall winner	Winner	Marino Lejarreta (ESP)	(Teka)
	Second	Michel Pollentier (BEL)	(Safir)
	Third	Sven-Åke Nilsson (SWE)	(Wolber)
Jersey awarded to the points classification winner	Points	Stefan Mutter (SUI)	(Puch - Eurotex)
Jersey awarded to the mountains classification winner	Mountains	José Luis Laguía (ESP)	(Reynolds)
	Sprints	Benny Schepmans (BEL)	(Van de Ven - Moser)
	Team	Kelme	

The 37th Edition Vuelta a España (Tour of Spain), a long-distance bicycle stage race and one of the three grand tours, was held from 20 April to 9 May 1982. It consisted of 19 stages covering a total of 3,456 km (2,147 mi), and was won by Marino Lejarreta of the Teka cycling team.

The Reynolds team controlled the race after team leader Ángel Arroyo took the leader's jersey on the tenth stage. Arroyo kept the jersey until the finish of the race where he won the final individual time trial. Arroyo won the grand tour ahead of Marino Lejarreta and Michel Pollentier. However 48 hours after his win, it emerged that in the doping control that was conducted after the stage 17 Arroyo tested positive. Three other riders also failed the doping test after stage 17: Alberto Fernández, Vicente Belda and Pedro Muñoz.

The four riders were said to have tested positive for Methylphenidate (which is also known as Ritalin) a stimulant. Methylphenidate was a popular drug for doping in cycling at that time. Arroyo and his team denied the allegations and asked for a second analysis of the sample. The B analysis confirmed the first positive test. Arroyo was assigned a 10-minute penalty and stripped of his Vuelta win which was given to Lejarreta. With the 10-minute penalty Arroyo went down to 13th place in the classification. The disqualification of the winner of the Vuelta has been called the worst scandal that has ever hit the race on the official La Vuelta website.

== Route ==
List of stages
Stage	Date	Course	Distance	Type	Winner
P	20 April	Santiago de Compostela to Santiago de Compostela	6.7 km (4 mi)	Individual time trial	Marc Gomez (FRA)
1a	21 April	Santiago de Compostela to A Coruña	97 km (60 mi)		Eddy Planckaert (BEL)
1b	21 April	A Coruña to Lugo	97 km (60 mi)		Eddy Planckaert (BEL)
2	22 April	Lugo to Gijón	240 km (149 mi)		Eddy Planckaert (BEL)
3	23 April	Gijón to Santander	208 km (129 mi)		Eddy Planckaert (BEL)
4	24 April	Santander to Reinosa	196 km (122 mi)		Antonio Coll (ESP)
5	25 April	Reinosa to Logroño	230 km (143 mi)		Ángel Camarillo (ESP)
6	26 April	Logroño to Zaragoza	190 km (118 mi)		José Luis Laguía (ESP)
7	27 April	Zaragoza to Sabiñánigo	146 km (91 mi)		Enrique Martínez Heredia (ESP)
8	28 April	Sabiñánigo to Lleida	216 km (134 mi)		Jesús Hernández Úbeda (ESP)
9	29 April	Artesa de Segre to Puigcerdà	182 km (113 mi)		José Luis Laguía (ESP)
10	30 April	Puigcerdà to Sant Quirze del Vallès	181 km (112 mi)		Sven-Åke Nilsson (SWE)
11	1 May	Sant Quirze del Vallès to Barcelona	143 km (89 mi)		José Luis Laguía (ESP)
12	2 May	Salou to Nules	200 km (124 mi)		Eddy Planckaert (BEL)
13	3 May	Nules to Antella	195 km (121 mi)		José Recio (ESP)
14	4 May	Antella to Albacete	153 km (95 mi)		Dominique Arnaud (FRA)
15a	5 May	Albacete to Tomelloso	119 km (74 mi)		Eddy Vanhaerens (BEL)
15b	5 May	Tomelloso to Campo de Criptana	35 km (22 mi)	Individual time trial	Ángel Arroyo (ESP)
16	6 May	Campo de Criptana to San Fernando de Henares	176 km (109 mi)		Willy Sprangers (BEL)
17	7 May	San Fernando de Henares to Navacerrada	178 km (111 mi)		Marino Lejarreta (ESP)
18	8 May	Palazuelos de Eresma (Destilerías DYC) to Palazuelos de Eresma (Destilerías DYC)	184 km (114 mi)		Juan Fernández (ESP)
19	9 May	Madrid to Madrid	84 km (52 mi)		Eddy Vanhaerens (BEL)
	Total		3,456 km (2,147 mi)		

== Results ==
=== Final General Classification ===
Rank	Rider	Team	Time
1	(Spain) Marino Lejarreta	Teka	95h 47' 23"
2	(Belgium) Michel Pollentier	Safir-Concorde	+ 18"
3	(Sweden) Sven-Åke Nilsson	Wolber-Spidel	+ 1' 17"
4	(Spain) Faustino Ruperez Rincon	Zor-Helios	+ 2' 14"
5	(Spain) José Luis Laguía	Reynolds-Galli	+ 2' 37"
6	(France) Pierre-Raymond Villemiane	Wolber-Spidel	+ 2' 43"
7	(Switzerland) Stefan Mutter	Puch-Eurotex	+ 4' 18"
8	(Spain) Jaime Vilamajo Ipiens	Kelme-Merckx	+ 4' 19s
9	(France) Marc Durant	Wolber-Spidel	+ 5' 10"
10	(Spain) Álvaro Pino	Zor-Helios	+ 5' 53"
11	(Spain) Enrique Martinez Heredia	Kelme-Merckx	
12	(Spain) Celestino Prieto Rodriquez	Kelme-Merckx	
13	(Spain) Ángel Arroyo	Reynolds-Galli	
14	(Spain) Eduardo Chozas	Zor-Helios	
15	(Spain) Alberto Fernandez	Teka	
16	(Belgium) Paul Wellens	Splendor-Wickes	
17	(Spain) Bernardo Alfonsel Lopez	Teka	
18	(Spain) Vicente Belda	Kelme-Merckx	
19	(Spain) Ismael Lejarreta	Teka	
20	(Spain) Juan Fernández	Kelme-Merckx	
21	(Netherlands) Jo Maas	Splendor-Wickes	
22	(France) Dominique Arnaud	Wolber-Spidel	
23	(Spain) Luis-Vicente Otin	Hueso	
24	(Belgium) Benny Van Brabant	Splendor-Wickes	
25	(Spain) Pedro Munoz Rodriguez	Zor-Helios	
