= 1978 Tour de Romandie =

Race details
- Dates: 2–7 May 1978
- Stages: 5 + Prologue
- Distance: 789.9 km (490.8 mi)
- Winning time: 21h 11' 50"

Results
| | Winner | Johan van der Velde (NED) |
| | Second | Hennie Kuiper (NED) |
| | Third | Johan De Muynck (BEL) |

The 1978 Tour de Romandie was the 32nd edition of the Tour de Romandie cycle race and was held from 2 May to 7 May 1978. The race started in Geneva and finished in Thyon. The race was won by Johan van der Velde.

== General classification ==
Final general classification
| Rank | Rider | Time |
|---|---|---|
| 1 | Johan van der Velde (NED) | 21h 11' 50" |
| 2 | Hennie Kuiper (NED) | + 2' 08" |
| 3 | Johan De Muynck (BEL) | + 2' 22" |
| 4 | Mariano Martínez (FRA) | + 2' 55" |
| 5 | Fausto Bertoglio (ITA) | + 2' 55" |
| 6 | Gottfried Schmutz (SUI) | + 3' 16" |
| 7 | Michel Laurent (FRA) | + 3' 44" |
| 8 | Pierre-Raymond Villemiane (FRA) | + 4' 06" |
| 9 | Yves Hézard (FRA) | + 4' 14" |
| 10 | Bruno Wolfer (SUI) | + 5' 22" |
