= 1986 Brabantse Pijl =

Race details
- Dates: 23 March 1986
- Stages: 1
- Distance: 179 km (111.2 mi)
- Winning time: 4h 19' 00"

Results
	Winner	Johan van der Velde (NED)
	Second	Eddy Planckaert (BEL)
	Third	Theo de Rooij (NED)

The 1986 Brabantse Pijl was the 26th edition of the Brabantse Pijl cycle race and was held in Belgium on 23 March 1986. The race started in Sint-Genesius-Rode and finished in Alsemberg. The race was won by Johan van der Velde.

== General classification ==
Final general classification

Rank	Rider	Time
1	Johan van der Velde (NED)	4h 19' 00"
2	Eddy Planckaert (BEL)	+ 12"
3	Theo de Rooij (NED)	+ 12"
4	Jean-Marie Wampers (BEL)	+ 12"
5	Ludwig Wijnants (BEL)	+ 12"
6	Gert-Jan Theunisse (NED)	+ 12"
7	Dirk Durant (BEL)	+ 12"
8	Eric Van Lancker (BEL)	+ 12"
9	Claude Criquielion (BEL)	+ 12"
10	Alfons De Wolf (BEL)	+ 12"
