= Philippe Poissonnier =

French cyclist

Personal information
- Born: 7 June 1951 (age 75) Lille, France

Cycling career
- Sport: Cycling
- Current team: Retired
- Discipline: Road
- Role: Rider

Professional teams
- 1981: Fangio–Sapeco–Mavic
- 1982–1983: Safir–Marc
- 1984–1985: Skil–Reydel–Sem–Mavic
- 1986–1987: Kas
- 1988: Hitachi–Bosal–B.C.E. Snooker

Philippe Poissonnier (born 7 June 1951) is a French former professional racing cyclist. He rode in one edition of the Tour de France, one edition of the Giro d'Italia and four editions of the Vuelta a España.

== Major results ==
1981
9th Le Samyn
1982
1st Stage 6 Deutschland Tour
1984
7th Binche–Tournai–Binche
8th Overall Étoile de Bessèges
8th Le Samyn

=== Grand Tour general classification results timeline ===
Grand Tour	1982	1983	1984	1985	1986
Giro d'Italia	—	—	—	86	—
Tour de France	—	—	—	90	—
Vuelta a España	45	—	58	66	105

Legend
—	Did not compete
DNF	Did not finish
