= Johan van der Velde =

Dutch cyclist (born 1956)

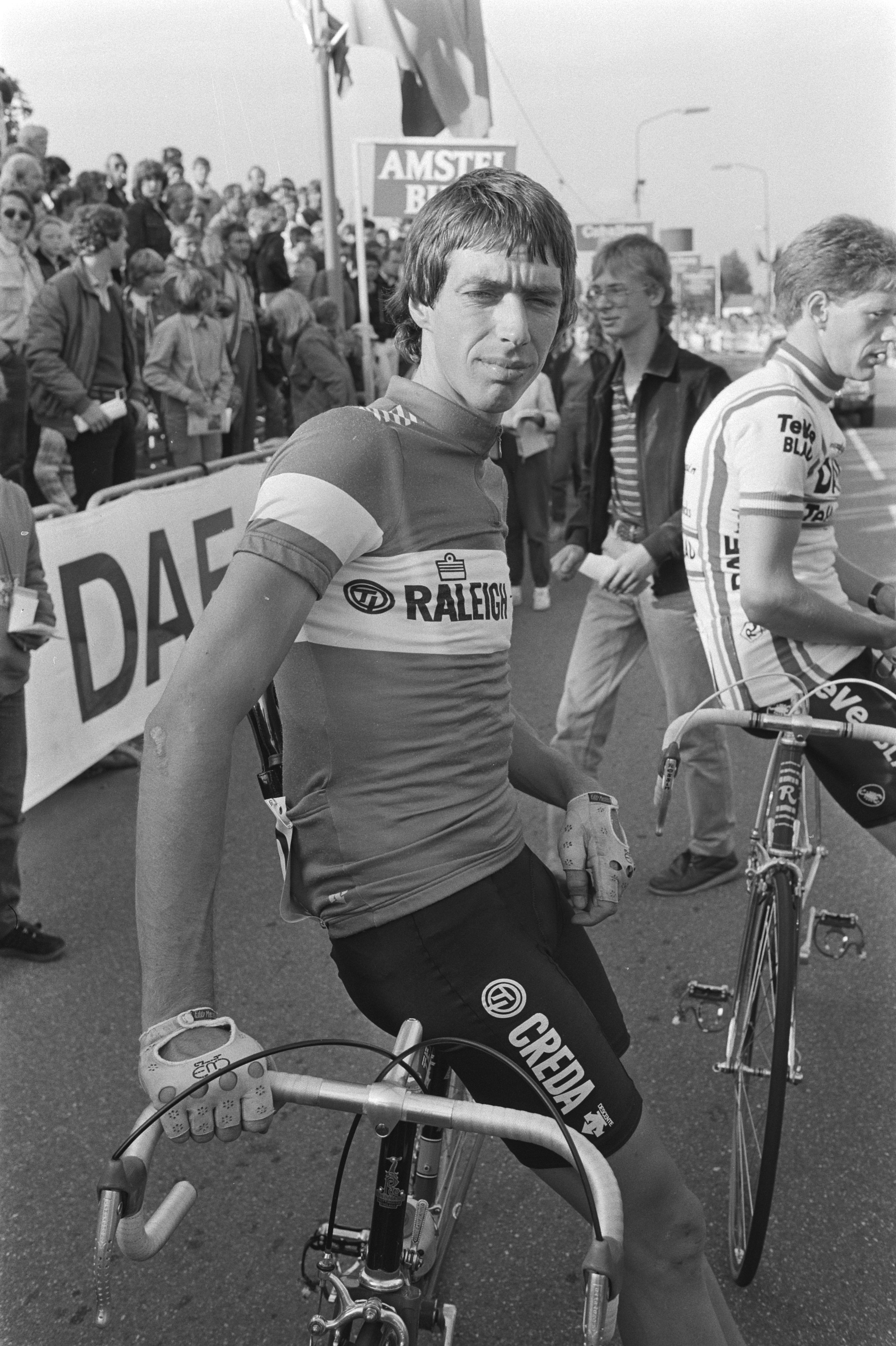
- Van der Velde in 1982

Personal information
- Full name: Johan van der Velde
- Born: 12 December 1956 (age 69) Rijsbergen, Netherlands

Cycling career
- Sport: Cycling
- Discipline: Road
- Role: Rider

Professional teams
- 1978–1983: TI–Raleigh–McGregor
- 1984–1985: Metauro Mobili–Pinarello
- 1986: Panasonic–Merckx–Agu
- 1987–1988: Gis Gelati–Jollyscarpe
- 1988–1989: TVM–Van Schilt
- 1989: Carrera Jeans–Vagabond
- 1990: IOC–Tulip Computers
- 1990: Orbea–Alimentos de España

Major wins
- Grand Tours Tour de France Young rider classification (1980) 3 individual stages (1981, 1986) 5 TTT stages (1980, 1981, 1982) Giro d'Italia Points classification (1985, 1987, 1988) 3 individual stages (1986, 1987) Stage Races Critérium du Dauphiné Libéré (1980) Tour de Romandie (1978) Ronde van Nederland (1978) Tour of Britain (1978) One-Day races and Classics National Road Race Championships (1980, 1982) Brabantse Pijl (1986) Zürich-Metzgete (1983)

Johan van der Velde (born 12 December 1956 in Rijsbergen) is a former Dutch cyclist. In the 1980 Tour de France, he won the young rider classification, also placing 12th in the general classification that year. He had been a racing cyclist for only a year. In the 1981 Tour de France, he took first place on the second and 21st stages, finishing 12th overall for the second year. He rode with TI–Raleigh in the Tour de France from 1979 to 1983 and the Panasonic team where he won Stage 5 and wore the Yellow Jersey for two days in the 1986 Tour de France.

== Decline ==
He was distinctive in the peloton for his lean, long-legged appearance, his smooth pedalling style and his long hair. He rode in support of riders such as Joop Zoetemelk, whom he could pace over mountains at impressive speed, but he was also capable of winning on his own. Success came to him early and, he said in an interview with the author Jan Siebelink ("Pijn is genot") that he had trouble coping when that success began to dry up. Van der Velde said he remembered shivering at the start of an Italian race, the skin of his arms wrinkled in goosebumps, because of the amphetamine he had taken just to start.

Addiction to amphetamine and a lifelong habit of petty theft, which he said came from seeing his father bring home things he had stolen from work, brought him into trouble with the law. He was caught stealing lawnmowers and breaking into post office stamp machines to raise money to cover his addiction and his gambling. The jail sentence and the loss of all he had won forced him and his Belgian wife, Josée, to sell the villa they had owned. They moved into a series of anonymous houses and apartments. Van der Velde began hospital treatment for his addiction and became deeply religious. He began work on building sites, rarely saying who he was or what he had been, to rebuild his self-esteem. For many years he tried to keep his address and his identity secret.

== Rehabilitation ==
Van der Velde is now often seen at junior races, where he accompanies his son, also a racer. He took part in a celebrity edition of the Big Brother television series in 2000 and has worked in public relations for the Quickstep team, driving its guests at races. It was announced that van der Velde would join the new Roompot Orange Cycling Team as a driver for 2015.

His manager at Ti-Raleigh, Peter Post, said he had always considered Van der Velde the son that he had never had.

== Career achievements ==
=== Major results ===
1977
Tour de Liège

1st Stages 3 & 5

1978
1st Overall Tour de Romandie

1st Stages 1 & 5

1st Overall Tour of Britain

1st Stage 4

1st Overall Ronde van Nederland

1st Stage 4

1979
1st Stage 2 Tour de Romandie
1980
1st Road race, National Road Championships
1st Overall Critérium du Dauphiné Libéré

1st Stage 6

Tour de France

1st Young rider classification
1st Stages 1b (TTT) & 7b (TTT)

2nd Overall Volta a Catalunya

1st Stages 1, 4a, 4b & 5

1981
Tour de France

1st Stages 1b (TTT), 2, 7 (TTT) & 21

Volta a Catalunya

1st Stages 1, 2 & 4

1st Prologue Critérium du Dauphiné Libéré
1st Stage 5a Tour de Romandie
1st Stage 4b GP du Midi-Libre
1st Stage 4 Ronde van Nederland
1982
1st Road race, National Road Championships
1st Stage 2 Volta a Catalunya
1st Stage 5a Ronde van Nederland
3rd Overall Tour de France

1st Stage 9a (TTT)

1983
1st Züri-Metzgete
1st Stage 5 Setmana Catalana de Ciclisme
1984
1st Stage 5a Tour de Romandie
1985
1st Points classification, Giro d'Italia
1st Coppa Bernocchi
1st Stage 4 Tour de Romandie
1986
1st Stage 5 Tour de France
1st Stage 19 Giro d'Italia
1st Brabantse Pijl
1987
1st Stage 3 Tour de Suisse
9th Overall Giro d'Italia

1st Points classification
1st Stages 15 & 16

1988
1st Points classification, Giro d'Italia

=== Grand Tour general classification results timeline ===
Grand Tour	1979	1980	1981	1982	1983	1984	1985	1986	1987	1988	1989
Vuelta a España	—	—	—	—	—	—	—	—	—	—	—
Giro d'Italia	—	—	—	—	—	5	22	16	9	65	DNF
Tour de France	14	12	12	3	DNF	—	—	52	—	—	—

Legend
—	Did not compete
DNF	Did not finish

== See also ==
- List of doping cases in cycling
- List of Dutch cyclists who have led the Tour de France general classification

Sporting positions
Preceded by Henk Lubberding	Dutch National Road Race Champion; 1980	Succeeded by Jacques Hanegraaf
Preceded by Jacques Hanegraaf	Dutch National Road Race Champion; 1982	Succeeded by Jan Raas
