= Gilbert Duclos-Lassalle =

French cyclist

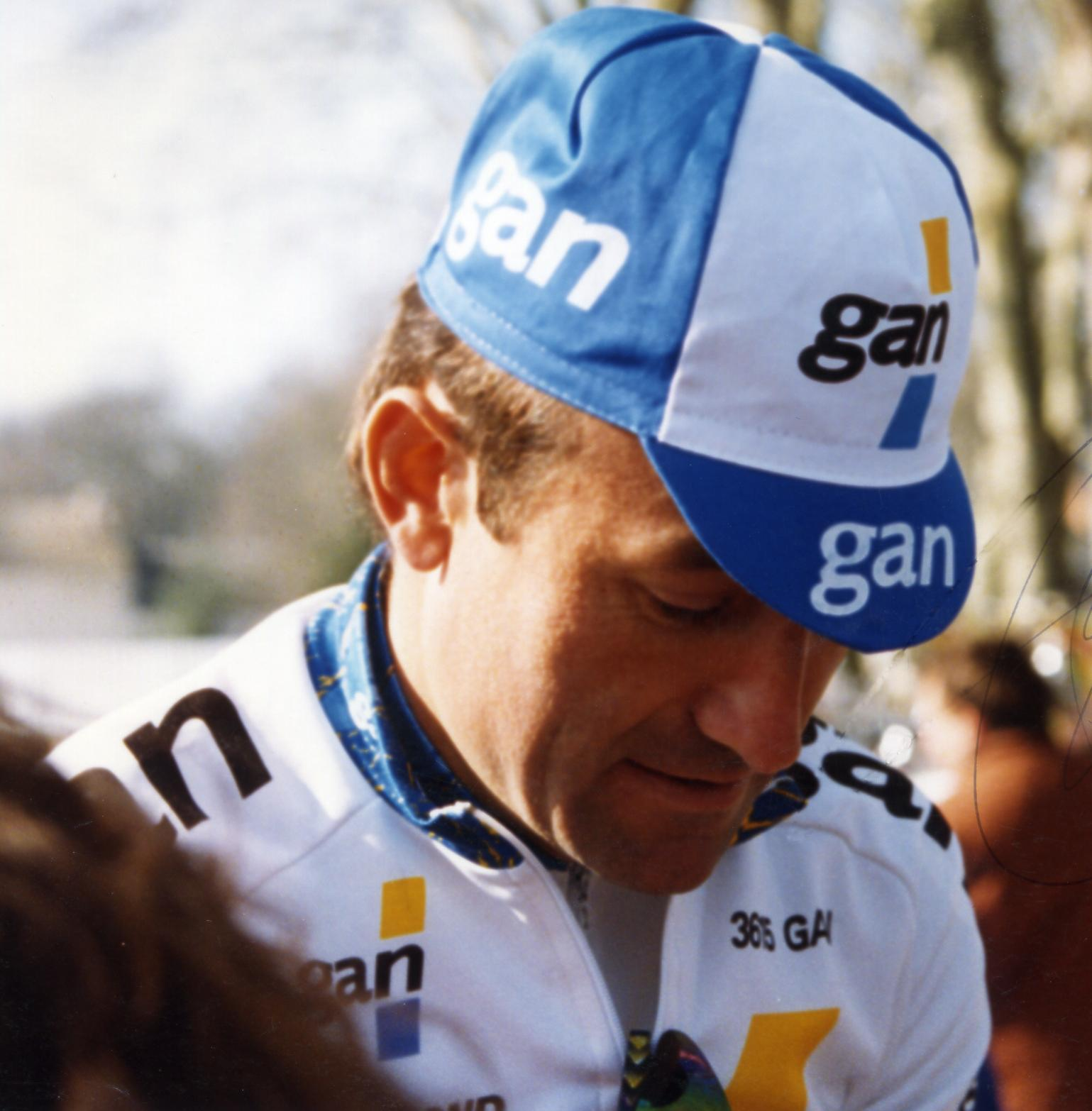
- Duclos-Lassalle at the 1993 Paris–Nice

Personal information
- Full name: Gilbert Duclos-Lassalle
- Nickname: Gibus
- Born: 25 August 1954 (age 72) Lembeye, France

Cycling career
- Sport: Cycling
- Discipline: Road
- Role: Rider

Professional teams
- 1977–1986: Peugeot–Esso–Michelin
- 1987–1995: Z–Peugeot

Major wins
- Grand Tours Tour de France Intermediate sprints classification (1987) Stage races Paris–Nice (1980) Grand Prix du Midi Libre (1991) One-day races and Classics Paris–Roubaix (1992, 1993) Bordeaux–Paris (1983) GP Ouest-France (1981, 1987)

Gilbert Duclos-Lassalle (born 25 August 1954) is a French former professional road racing cyclist who was a specialist at one-day classic cycling races. He raced from 1977 to 1995, one of the best French riders of a generation that included Bernard Hinault and Laurent Fignon.

Born in Lembeye, Duclos-Lassalle was a specialist of Paris–Roubaix, but it took "Duclos", as the public called him, a long time to win. After finishing second to Francesco Moser in 1980 and Hennie Kuiper in 1983, he won in 1992, finishing on Roubaix Velodrome 20 seconds ahead the German Olaf Ludwig.

Duclos-Lassalle was 37 years old. But the next year he won again, beating the Italian Franco Ballerini on the line. Ballerini, who thought he won, lifted his arms in triumph after the line but had been beaten by Duclos-Lassalle in a very close finish.

Not a climber, Duclos-Lassalle was never a contender for the Tour de France but he rode well in one-week races such as Paris–Nice or the Critérium du Midi Libre.

A cobbled secteur used in Paris–Roubaix between Wallers and Hélesmes was officially named "Pont Gibus" in tribute to Duclos-Lassalle in time for the 2013 edition of the race. This is the second of the race's cobbled sections to be named after him: the secteur between Cysoing and Bourghelles is known as the "Pavé Gilbert Duclos-Lassalle".

His son Hervé Duclos-Lassalle was also a professional cyclist.

Gilbert Duclos-Lassalle has worked since retirement as a television commentator.

== Major results ==
1976
1st Stage 9 (ITT) Trophée Peugeot de l'Avenir
1977
6th Overall Étoile des Espoirs
1978 (1 pro win)
7th Overall Tour de Corse

1st Stage 1

8th Overall Paris–Nice
1979
5th Overall Tour du Limousin
5th Grand Prix de Fourmies
5th Circuit de l'Indre
1980 (10)
1st Overall Paris–Nice
1st Tour du Tarn

1st Points classification
1st Prologue

1st Overall Étoile des Espoirs

1st Stages 2b (ITT) & 4

1st Overall Tour de Corse

1st Stage 1

1st Stage 2a (ITT) Paris–Bourges
1st Stage 3 Tour d'Armorique
2nd Paris–Roubaix
3rd Overall À travers Lausanne
5th Trofeo Baracchi (with Jacques Bossis)
7th Tour of Flanders
8th Overall Critérium National de la Route
8th Amstel Gold Race
1981 (3)
1st GP Ouest-France
Tour du Limousin

1st Stages 2 & 3

2nd Omloop Het Volk
4th Road race, UCI Road World Championships
4th Grand Prix de Monaco
4th Grand Prix d'Isbergues
4th Grand Prix de Peymeinade
5th Grand Prix des Nations
7th Bordeaux–Paris
1982 (2)
1st Stage 2 Tour de Corse
2nd Overall Paris–Nice
2nd Grand Prix de Plumelec
2nd Polynormande
3rd Overall Tour de l'Oise
4th Nice–Alassio
6th Overall Four Days of Dunkirk
7th Overall Critérium International

1st Stage 1

9th Grand Prix de Peymeinade
1983 (6)
1st Overall Tour Midi-Pyrénées

1st Prologue

1st Bordeaux–Paris
1st Grand Prix de Fourmies
1st Stage 4 Tour du Limousin
1st Stage 5a Four Days of Dunkirk
2nd Overall Tour de l'Oise
2nd Paris–Roubaix
2nd Nice–Alassio
5th Châteauroux–Limoges
6th Amstel Gold Race
6th Grand Prix d'Isbergues
8th Grand Prix des Nations
10th Critérium des As
1984 (3)
1st Individual pursuit, National Track Championships
1st Overall Étoile des Espoirs

1st Stages 3 & 4b (ITT)

3rd Circuit de l'Aulne
5th Overall Tour du Limousin
6th Paris–Tours
7th Grand Prix d'Isbergues
1985 (1)
1st Grand Prix de Rennes
2nd Bordeaux–Paris
2nd Grand Prix d'Isbergues
3rd Overall Paris–Bourges
3rd Circuit de l'Aulne
3rd Grand Prix de Fourmies
5th Overall Tour of Sweden
6th GP Ouest-France
1986 (5)
1st Overall Tour of Sweden

1st Stage 5b (ITT)

1st Overall Tour de l'Oise
1st A Travers le Morbihan
Tour Midi-Pyrénées

1st Prologue and Stage 3a

2nd Grand Prix d'Isbergues
3rd Overall Four Days of Dunkirk
4th Bordeaux–Paris
6th Tour du Haut Var
6th Grand Prix de Denain
6th Grand Prix des Nations
6th Giro del Piemonte
9th Overall Tour d'Armorique
1987 (2)
1st Intermediate sprints classification, Tour de France
1st GP Ouest-France
1st Circuit de l'Aulne
6th Critérium des As
7th Overall Tour de l'Oise
7th Overall Nissan Classic
1988
2nd Overall Route du Sud
2nd Overall Tour d'Armorique
3rd Road race, National Road Championships
6th Overall Tour du Limousin
9th Overall Four Days of Dunkirk
9th Bordeaux–Paris
1989 (1)
1st Overall Route du Sud
3rd Overall Circuit de la Sarthe
4th Paris–Roubaix
5th Overall Four Days of Dunkirk
6th Trophée des Grimpeurs
1990 (1)
1st La Route d'Or des As
6th Paris–Roubaix
7th Overall Four Days of Dunkirk
8th Overall Circuit de la Sarthe
9th Trophée des Grimpeurs
10th E3 Prijs Vlaanderen
1991 (3)
1st Overall Grand Prix du Midi Libre

1st Stages 1 & 2

1992 (1)
1st Paris–Roubaix
5th Overall Four Days of Dunkirk
5th Cholet-Pays de la Loire
7th Amstel Gold Race
10th GP Ouest-France
10th Tour de Vendée
1993 (2)
1st Paris–Roubaix
1st Stage 2 Critérium du Dauphiné Libéré
1994 (1)
1st Stage 3 Route du Sud
5th Overall Etoile de Bessèges
7th Paris–Roubaix
1995 (1)
1st Stage 2 Tour of the Basque Country
2nd Grand Prix d'Isbergues
