= 1987 GP Ouest-France =

Race details
- Dates: 25 August 1987
- Stages: 1
- Distance: 237 km (147 mi)
- Winning time: 5h 38' 11"

Results
	Winner	Gilbert Duclos-Lassalle (FRA)	(Vétements Z–Peugeot)
	Second	Jean-Claude Bagot (FRA)	(Fagor–MBK)
	Third	Frédéric Brun (FRA)	(Vétements Z–Peugeot)

The 1987 GP Ouest-France was the 51st edition of the GP Ouest-France cycle race and was held on 25 August 1987. The race started and finished in Plouay. The race was won by Gilbert Duclos-Lassalle of the Vétements Z–Peugeot team.

== General classification ==
Final general classification

Rank	Rider	Team	Time
1	Gilbert Duclos-Lassalle (FRA)	Vétements Z–Peugeot	5h 38' 11"
2	Jean-Claude Bagot (FRA)	Fagor–MBK	+ 0"
3	Frédéric Brun (FRA)	Vétements Z–Peugeot	+ 49"
4	Kim Andersen (DEN)	Toshiba–Look	+ 51"
5	Joël Pelier (FRA)	Système U	+ 51"
6	Jean-François Rault (FRA)	RMO–Cycles Méral–Mavic	+ 1' 42"
7	Johnny Weltz (DEN)	Fagor–MBK	+ 2' 47"
8	Franck Boucanville (FRA)	Reynolds	+ 3' 06"
9	Richard Vivien (FRA)	Amateur (U.V. Caen)	+ 5' 25"
10	Sean Kelly (IRL)	Kas	+ 5' 25"
