= Jacques Martin (cyclist) =

Belgian cyclist

Personal information
- Born: 16 April 1952
- Died: 22 June 2004 (aged 52)

Cycling career
- Sport: Cycling
- Role: Rider

Jacques Martin (French pronunciation: [ʒak maʁtɛ̃]; 16 April 1952 – 22 June 2004) was a Belgian racing cyclist. He rode in the 1978 Tour de France.
