= Willy Sprangers =

Belgian cyclist

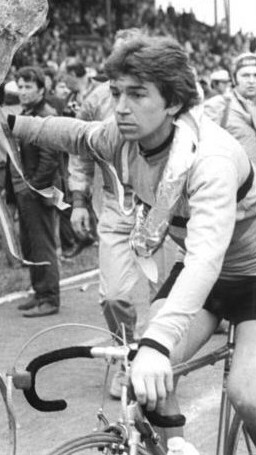
- Sprangers at the 1977 Peace Race

Personal information
- Born: 5 March 1954 (age 72) Merksem, Belgium

Cycling career
- Sport: Cycling
- Current team: Retired
- Discipline: Road
- Role: Rider

Professional team
- 1978–1983: Safir–Beyers–Ludo

Major wins
- Grand Tours Vuelta a España 1 individual stage (1982)

Willy Sprangers (born 5 March 1954) is a Belgian former road cyclist. Professional from 1978 to 1983, he notably won a stage of the 1982 Vuelta a España.

== Major results ==
1977
1st Stage 4b Ruban Granitier Breton
1979
1st Grand Prix E5
4th Grand Prix Cerami
7th Druivenkoers-Overijse
1980
6th Nationale Sluitingprijs
1982
1st Stage 16 Vuelta a España
