= 1982 Tour of the Basque Country =

Race details
- Dates: 12–16 April 1982
- Stages: 5
- Distance: 875.3 km (543.9 mi)
- Winning time: 22h 09' 07"

Results
	Winner	José Luis Laguía (ESP)	(Reynolds)
	Second	Julián Gorospe (ESP)	(Reynolds)
	Third	Francesco Moser (ITA)	(Famcucine–Campagnolo)

The 1982 Tour of the Basque Country was the 22nd edition of the Tour of the Basque Country cycle race and was held from 12 April to 16 April 1982. The race started in Azpeitia and finished at Lazkaomendi. The race was won by José Luis Laguía of the Reynolds team.

== General classification ==
Final general classification

Rank	Rider	Team	Time
1	José Luis Laguía (ESP)	Reynolds	22h 09' 07"
2	Julián Gorospe (ESP)	Reynolds	+ 4"
3	Francesco Moser (ITA)	Famcucine–Campagnolo	+ 7"
4	Vicente Belda (ESP)	Kelme–Merckx	+ 18"
5	Álvaro Pino (ESP)	Zor–Helios–Gemeaz Cusin	+ 19"
6	Paul Wellens (BEL)	Splendor–Wickes Bouwmarkt	+ 21"
7	Alfio Vandi (ITA)	Selle San Marco	+ 36"
8	Juan Fernández (ESP)	Kelme–Merckx	+ 36"
9	Sergio Santimaria (ITA)	Selle San Marco	+ 40"
10	Faustino Rupérez (ESP)	Zor–Helios–Gemeaz Cusin	+ 41"
