= 1979 Paris–Nice =

Race details
- Dates: 7–14 March 1979
- Stages: 7 + Prologue
- Distance: 1,079.5 km (670.8 mi)
- Winning time: 28h 36' 23"

Results
Jersey awarded to the overall winner	Winner	Joop Zoetemelk (NED)	(Miko–Mercier–Vivagel)
	Second	Sven-Åke Nilsson (SWE)	(Miko–Mercier–Vivagel)
	Third	Gerrie Knetemann (NED)	(TI–Raleigh–McGregor)

The 1979 Paris–Nice was the 37th edition of the Paris–Nice cycle race and was held from 7 March to 14 March 1979. The race started in Paris and finished in Nice. The race was won by Joop Zoetemelk of the Miko team.

== General classification ==
Final general classification

Rank	Rider	Team	Time
1	Joop Zoetemelk (NED)	Miko–Mercier–Vivagel	28h 36' 23"
2	Sven-Åke Nilsson (SWE)	Miko–Mercier–Vivagel	+ 1' 44"
3	Gerrie Knetemann (NED)	TI–Raleigh–McGregor	+ 1' 47"
4	Henk Lubberding (NED)	TI–Raleigh–McGregor	+ 2' 07"
5	Daniel Willems (BEL)	IJsboerke–Warncke Eis	+ 3' 16"
6	Bernard Hinault (FRA)	Renault–Gitane	+ 3' 36"
7	Eddy Schepers (BEL)	DAF Trucks–Aida	+ 6' 51"
8	René Bittinger (FRA)	Flandria–Ça va seul	+ 6' 52"
9	Bernard Vallet (FRA)	La Redoute–Motobécane	+ 7' 44"
10	Pierre Bazzo (FRA)	La Redoute–Motobécane	+ 7' 47"
