= Dominique Arnaud =

French cyclist (1955–2016)

Personal information
- Full name: Dominique Arnaud
- Born: 19 September 1955 Tarnos, France
- Died: 20 July 2016 (aged 60) Dax, Aquitaine, France

Cycling career
- Sport: Cycling
- Discipline: Road
- Role: Rider
- Rider type: Road captain

Professional teams
- 1980: Reynolds
- 1981–1983: Puch–Wolber–Campagnolo
- 1984–1985: La Vie Claire
- 1986–1991: Reynolds

Major wins
- Grand Tours Vuelta a España 3 individual stages (1980, 1982, 1987)

Dominique Arnaud (19 September 1955 – 20 July 2016) was a French racing cyclist. He rode in eleven editions of the Tour de France.

Arnaud won three stages in the Vuelta a España, a stage in the Midi Libre and the Tour du Limousin in 1983.

== Personal life ==
=== Death ===
Arnaud lived in Mées, but died of cancer in a hospital in Dax. A week before his death, a square in Mées was named after him.

== Major results ==
1980
1st Stage 16a Vuelta a España
10th Trofeo Masferrer
1981
2nd GP Ouest-France
2nd Overall Tour du Limousin
2nd Overall Étoile des Espoirs
10th Overall Tour du Vaucluse
1982
1st Stage 14 Vuelta a España
1983
1st Overall Tour du Limousin
1st GP de la Ville de Rennes
6th GP Ouest-France
1984
4th La Flèche Wallonne
7th Circuit Cycliste Sarthe
9th Overall Tour du Limousin
1985
1st Stage 3a Tour d'Armorique
1st Maël-Pestivien
4th Grand Prix de Mauléon-Moulins
9th Overall Tour du Limousin

1st Stage 4

1986
1st Stage 5a Volta a Catalunya
1987
1st Stage 16 Vuelta a España
1st Stage 3 Vuelta a Andalucía
1988
2nd Boucles de l'Aulne
1990
1st Stage 4 Tour du Vaucluse
2nd Overall GP du Midi-Libre

1st Stage 6 (ITT)

=== Grand Tour general classification results timeline ===
| Grand Tour | 1980 | 1981 | 1982 | 1983 | 1984 | 1985 | 1986 | 1987 | 1988 | 1989 | 1990 | 1991 |
|---|---|---|---|---|---|---|---|---|---|---|---|---|
| Vuelta a España | 54 | — | 22 | — | — | — | — | 50 | — | 38 | — | — |
| Giro d'Italia | — | — | — | 25 | — | 34 | — | — | 38 | — | — | 33 |
| Tour de France | — | 24 | 36 | 26 | 54 | 22 | 76 | DNF | 48 | 30 | 59 | 77 |
