= Hans Neumayer =

German cyclist

Personal information
- Born: 10 January 1956 (age 70) Germany

Cycling career
- Sport: Cycling
- Role: Rider

Hans Neumayer (born 10 January 1956 in Moosburg an der Isar) is a former German racing cyclist. He won the German National Road Race in 1981 and 1982.
