= Campo de Criptana =

- Municipality
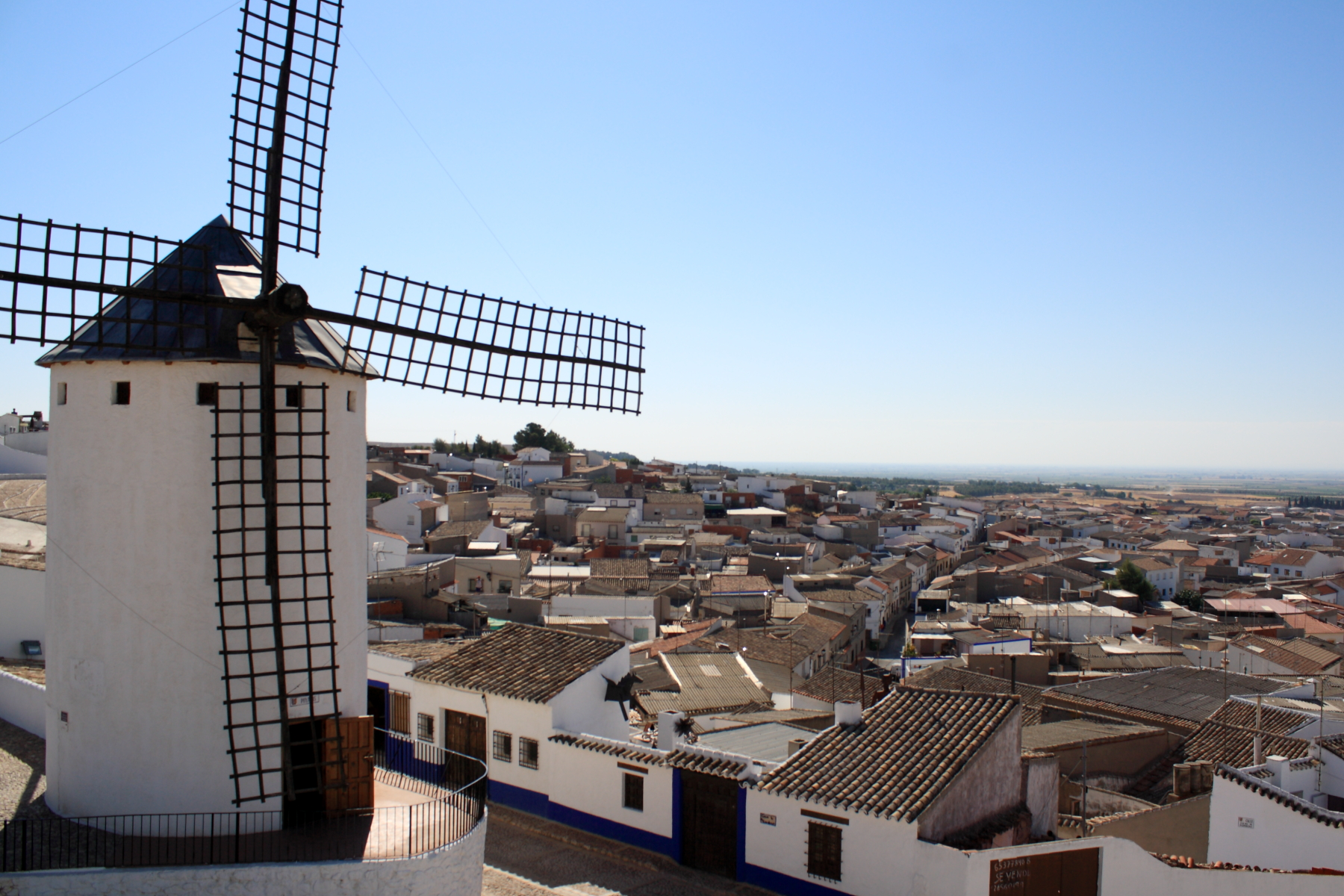
- Campo de Criptana

- Flag Coat of arms

- Location in Castilla–La Mancha Location in Spain
- Coordinates: 39°24′N 3°7′W
- Country: Spain
- Autonomous community: Castilla–La Mancha
- Province: Ciudad Real
- Comarca: Mancha Alta
- Judicial district: Alcázar de San Juan
- Commonwealth: Promancha

Government
  - Alcalde: Santiago Lucas-Torres López-Casero (2007) (PP)

Area
  - Total: 302.41 km^{2} (116.76 sq mi)
- Elevation: 707 m (2,320 ft)
- Highest elevation: 780 m (2,560 ft)
- Lowest elevation: 635 m (2,083 ft)

Population (2025-01-01)
  - Total: 12,868
  - Density: 42.552/km^{2} (110.21/sq mi)
- Demonym: criptanense
- Time zone: UTC+1 (CET)
  - Summer (DST): UTC+2 (CEST)
- Postal code: 13610
- Website: Official website

Campo de Criptana is a municipality and town in the province of Ciudad Real in the autonomous community of Castilla–La Mancha (Spain). It is found in the region known as La Mancha.

== History ==
=== Historical development ===
The area surrounding Campo de Criptana has been inhabited since prehistoric times. Prehistoric implements of hunting, gathering, and agriculture have been found in various locations, as have ceramics, particularly from the Bronze Age. From historic times, the most plentiful remnants have been Ibero-Roman.

Settlement of the present city center of Campo de Criptana dates from the 13th century, though the municipal area was occupied by human beings much earlier. Numerous archaeological remains and historical documents attest to the existence of inhabited centers since the Bronze Age. There is evidence of settlements of some importance—at least since the Middle Ages—named Criptana, Villajos, Posadas Viejas and El Campo, as well as others of lesser significance, such as Villagordo, El Pico de la Solana, etc.

Criptana, located about two kilometers east of the present city center, was granted, under the name of Chitrana, by the Order of St. John in 1162 to the Toledo Mozarab nobleman Miguel Assaraff in order that it be resettled. Later it passed to the Order of Santiago, forming the center of an estate that also had property in Villajos and Pedro Muñoz. By the 14th century it was again depopulated.

Villajos, some four kilometers to the north of the current city center, had been populated since prehistoric times. It appears in a citation from 1162, together with Chitrana, Spain, and Attires, as property of the Order of St. John. In various medieval documents it is mentioned under other names such as Villa de Alios and Villa de Ajos. It was depopulated from the 12th century, and the current hermitage was built over the original church of its city center.

Hardly any documented information exists about Posadas Viejas, except that it was situated near Camino de la Puente, south of the present railway line, and that it was depopulated around 1300.

El Campo grew up in the current location of the city center, around a fortified position of the Cerro (hill) de la Paz, which served as an outpost of the Castillo (Castle) de Criptana. Despite being at the time the newest center, arising with the repopulation in the 13th century, it attracted people from the surrounding centers, perhaps on account of the quality of its water and air. The towns referred to above disappeared, giving way to the new community. Named Campo de Criptana, it is first referred to in documents from the early 14th century.

Throughout the Middle Ages, the population of the town center grew, helped along by the facilities provided by the various maestres ("masters") of the Order of Santiago. The survey records of Philip II (1575) report some 1,000 households (between four and five thousand inhabitants), which by the first decade of the 17th century had risen to 1,300–1,500 households. From this time its population shows the unfortunate state of a rural society affected very severely by climate, epidemics of disease, poor harvests, and excessive taxation. The recovery was very slow until well into the 19th century.

Until the beginning of the 19th century, the local economy was based on traditional Mediterranean agriculture—grains, olives, and grapes—with the addition of wool. In the early 19th century there began to be a certain amount of industrialization related to the primary economy, in particular the manufacture of flour, and most of all, wine-making. The railway arrived in the second half of the 19th century and had a significant effect on this process of industrialization. In the second half of the 20th century tourism became a catalyzing new element of the local economy.

Until 1999 the municipal area also included Arenales de San Gregorio, which was situated 13 kilometers southeast of the main core, and had 700 inhabitants. After that date San Gregorio constituted an independent municipality.

=== Formation of the urban center ===
The 13th century beginnings of the urban center were situated around a fortified position in the Cerro de La Paz, which served as a defensive outpost of the Castillo de Criptana. The topographical features of the area determined the formation of the city and its subsequent expansion into the plain to the south.

In the 16th century the city experienced a period of prosperity that manifested itself in numerous construction projects, both civil (the Granary, Casa de la Tercia) and religious (Hermitages of the Virgen de la Paz, Veracruz, Santa Ana, and Nuestra Señora de la Concepción; Convento de las Carmelitas). However, the national crisis of the 17th century affected the city, which, once having reached the plain, halted its expansion.

In the initial third of the 19th century, having recovered from the effects of the Peninsular War (also known as the War of Spanish Independence), the municipality became an important agricultural center with a gradually rising population. This gave rise to a local bourgeoisie, which, benefitting from the confiscation of church property, strengthened its economic power in the second half of the 19th century and made possible the emergence of a historic, regionalist, and modern architecture which characterizes this period of city-building. These well-off families built their residences in the center of the city, leading to an urban renewal that manifested itself in particular in the change from the agrarian pattern in which large open fields predominated, to one in which the dominant areas were those that accommodated residential uses and the land was related to residential activity rather than agriculture.

The arrival of the railway in the second half of the 19th century led to the placement of the new industrial facilities in the southeast part of the core, near the train station.

During the first third of the 20th century the growth of the city continued inhabitation of the flatter areas and movement toward the south.

The municipal population reached its high point in the middle of the 20th century (15,659 inhabitants in 1950), with economic growth then coming to a halt as a consequence of emigration to the large cities (the municipality lost 2,369 inhabitants between 1950 and 1980). Expansion of the city ended; growth was limited to small developments along the southern border.

The last quarter of the 20th century saw a renewed, major expansion of the city, which in just over 20 years almost doubled the area that was occupied in the 1970s.

The resulting growth of residences (almost all single-family homes), industrial installations (in the extreme southeast area and in isolated pockets), and office buildings produced a mostly unplanned urban area with overall deficiencies in infrastructure. Since the approval of the first municipal planning regulations in 1981 (which involved the formal adoption of the decision to manage the city's development at the municipal level) the situation has been gradually improved.

== Monuments and places of interest ==
=== Windmills ===
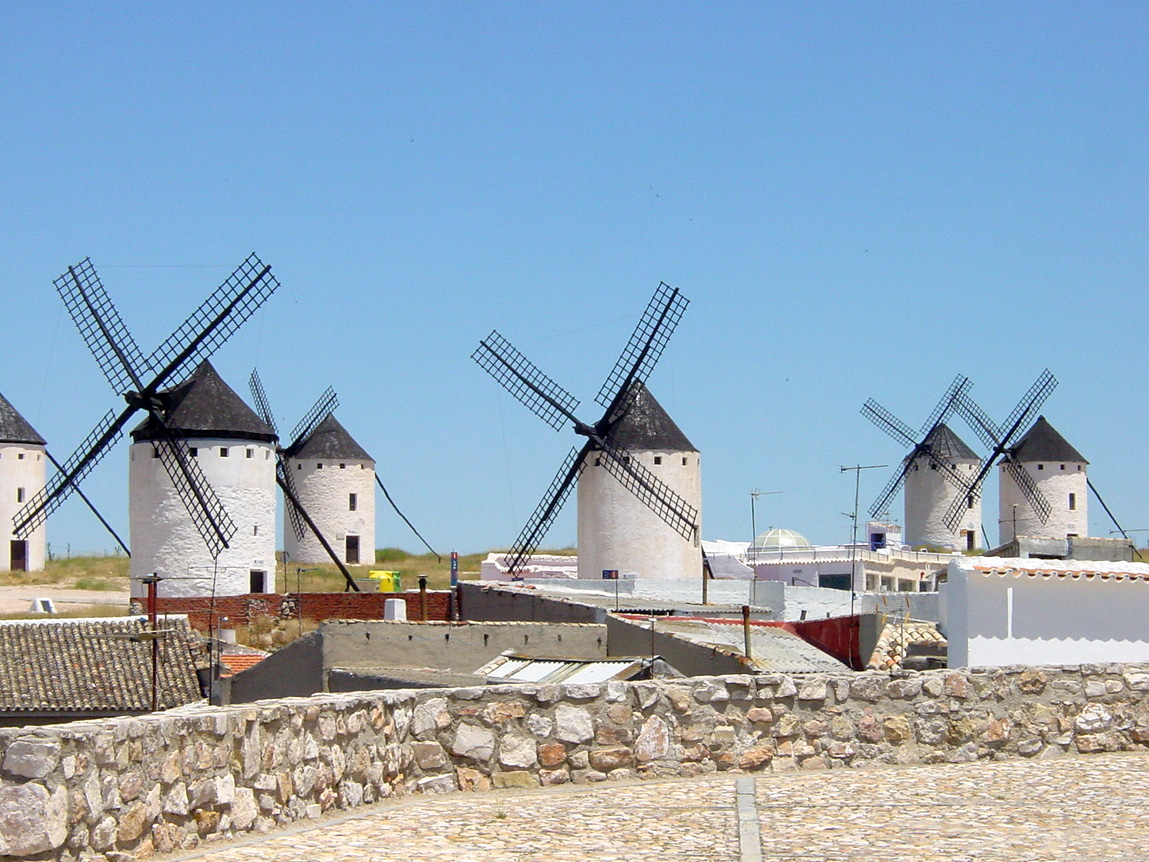
Group of windmills in Campo de Criptana

"At this point they caught sight of thirty or forty windmills which were standing on the plain..." Thus begins chapter VIII of Don Quixote. In Cervantes's time windmills were quite common. This view is undoubtedly the characteristic landscape of Campo de Criptana, presenting its silhouette from the Sierra de los Molinos and the Cerro de la Paz. A 19th century land registry drawn up at the behest of the Marqués de la Ensenada shows 34 windmills in existence at that time, each clearly marked with the name of the mill and that of its owner. Through archaeological remnants, it is known that they had once been far more numerous.

Today, ten windmills can be seen from afar, with their original structure and machinery preserved. Visitors can tour the inside of the mills and listen to a presentation about their function. Other mills have been converted into museums: the Inca Garcilaso is a museum celebrating the working of the land, the Pilón is a museum of wine, the Quimera is dedicated to Vicente Huidobro, the Culebro to the actress Sara Montiel, and the Lagarto to poetry. The Poyatos windmill houses the Office of Tourism. Every Saturday one of the restored mills is put into operation.

In 1978, the entire group of windmills was declared a Monument of Historical-Artistic Interest, which today is referred to as a Cultural Heritage Site.

=== Pósito (Granary) ===
A pósito is a building for storing grain (especially wheat), that is, a granary. The granary as an institution is quite old, and was run by the local government. Its purpose was to provide grain to farm workers in difficult times, on terms favourable to the recipients, and furthermore to regulate the market for wheat whenever its price (and therefore that of bread) was increasing at an alarming rate.

The granary of Campo de Criptana is from the 16th century, and was renovated and enlarged by Charles III. The access door is on the main facade, which looks out over the plaza that carries the name of the building, Plaza del Pósito. At the midpoint it has an arch, decorated with a three-sided frame known as an alfiz, and above that three coats of arms, two of them of the Order of Santiago.

The granary was in use up to the Peninsular War (1808–1814), at which point it began to fall into disuse. The granary was auctioned off in 1914 and passed into private hands. In 1991 the local government re-acquired it and had it restored for use as a town museum, where expositions and cultural activities could take place. The restoration was carried out by a teaching workshop, which for its fine work received a diploma awarded by Europa Nostra in 1997.

=== Iglesia de Nuestra Señora de la Asunción ===
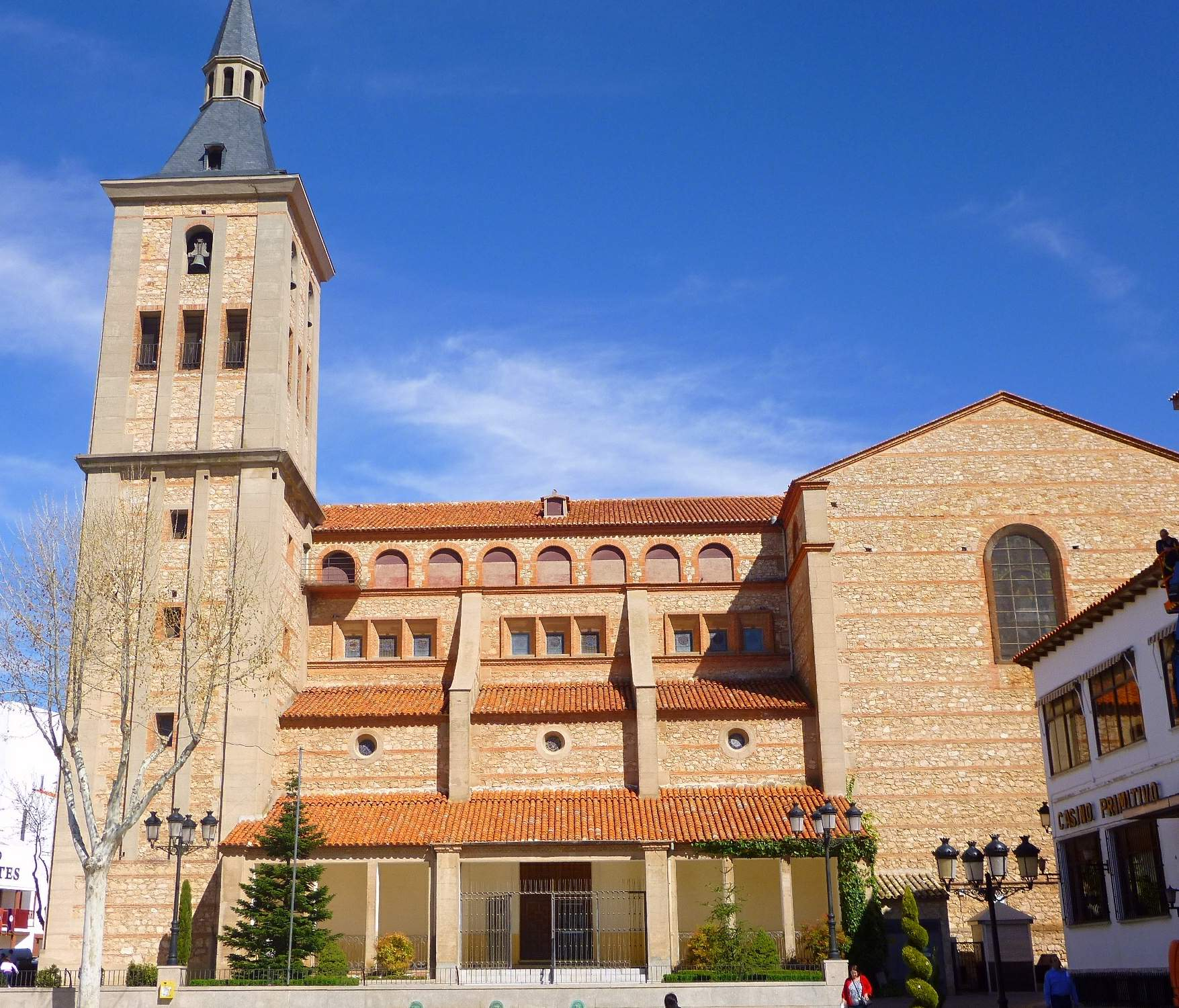
Iglesia de Nuestra Señora de la Asunción

A modern church, opened in 1958. The building was erected on the site of the 16th century church, which burned in 1936, during the Spanish Civil War.

=== Convent Church ===
A possession of the convent of the Barefoot Carmelites, which was confiscated in the 19th century through the law of Mendizábal. Its current appearance is a result of the renovations done in the 18th century according to the Jesuit church model. The transept has a cupola crowned by a lantern. A shrine to the Thousand and One Virgins, donated by the archbishop of Colonia in 1612, is still preserved.

=== Hermitage of the Virgen de la Paz ===
Found near the Cerro de la Paz, from where one can view a magnificent countryside. For several centuries it was dedicated to St. Christopher, who was the protector from the plagues. It is surrounded by a neighbourhood consisting of small white dwellings with a similar appearance to the hermitage. It has a rectangular layout with a single nave, and a ceiling with a groin vault. Besides this building, there are nine more hermitages surrounding Criptana:

- Hermitage of Veracruz
- Hermitage of Santa Ana
- Hermitage of la Madre de Dios
- Hermitage of San Cristóbal
- Hermitage of the Concepción
- Hermitage de San Sebastián
- Hermitage de San Pedro
- Hermitage of Cristo de Villajos
- Hermitage of the Virgen de Criptana

=== Streets and neighbourhoods ===
All of the streets that encircle Cerro de la Paz follow the shape of the old town and are on a hillside, which makes Criptana different from other towns of La Mancha, all of which are on the plain.

At the end of the 16th century many Moorish families from Granada took refuge in the eastern part of the town and from that time the new neighbourhood has been known as the Albaicín, referring to the ancient neighbourhood of the same name in Granada. The houses still have their Arabic tiles, painted in white and indigo, and wrought iron grilles in the windows.

== Festivals ==
- Festival of the Santísima Virgen de Criptana (Easter Monday)
- Festival of Santísimo Cristo de Villajos (first Thursday in August)
- Carnival
- Holy Week

== Cuisine ==
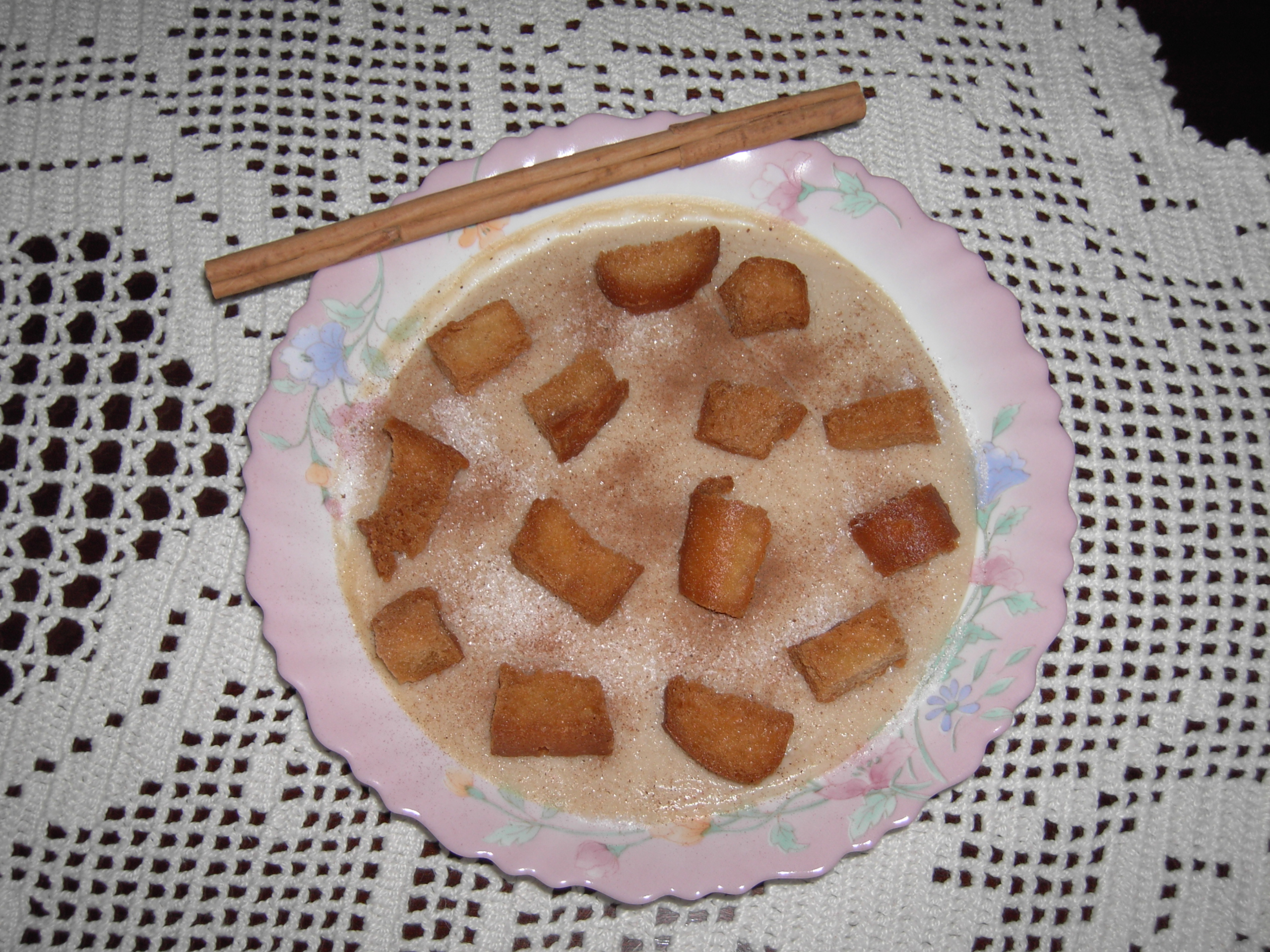
Gachas Manchegas.

Typical dishes include:

- gachas manchegas (a fried pastry with chopped ham, garlic, paprika, sausage, etc.)
- migas de pastor (fried bread crumbs with chopped ham, garlic, paprika)
- cordero a la caldereta (lamb stew)
- pisto manchego (a ratatouille-like dish)
- garlic soup
- scrambled eggs with onion and manchego cheese
- arroz con duz frío (a typical dessert—cold rice with caramel)
