= Sven-Åke Nilsson =

Swedish cyclist

Personal information
- Full name: Sven-Åke Nilsson
- Born: 13 September 1951 (age 75) Malmö, Sweden

Cycling career
- Sport: Cycling
- Current team: Retired
- Role: Rider

Professional teams
- 1977–1980: Miko–Mercier
- 1981: Splendor–Wickes
- 1982: Wolber
- 1983: Termolan–Galli
- 1984: Santini–Conti
Medal record
Representing Sweden
Men's road bicycle racing
World Championships
Silver medal – second place	1975 Mettet	Amateur's Road Race

Sven-Åke Nilsson (born 13 September 1951) is a Swedish retired road racing cyclist. His sporting career began with CK Ringen Malmö. He was a professional cyclist from 1977 until his retirement in 1984.

For half a decade early in his career he was among the strongest GC Contenders and often among the top 10 overall during the Tour de France while riding for the very strong Miko–Mercier squads, who also included riders like Christian Seznec, Raymond Martin and Joop Zoetemelk. In the 1978 Tour de France he finished 11th, in 1979 12th, 1980 7th and in 1981 he finished 8th. He had a stage win and 3rd place overall in the 1982 Vuelta, and a few months later he rode the Tour for the final time in the 1982 Tour de France, and finished 14th.

Other career highlights include two stage wins in Paris–Nice and competing at the 1972 Summer Olympics and 1976 Summer Olympics.

== Major results ==
1972
1st Road race, National Amateur Road Championships
1974
1st Team time trial, UCI Road World Championships
1976
1st Overall Tour de l'Avenir

1st Stage 1

1978
11th Overall Tour de France
1979
1st Tour de Corse
1st Étoile des Espoirs
2nd Overall Paris–Nice

1st Stage 4

3rd Overall Critérium International
3rd Amstel Gold Race
12th Overall Tour de France
1980
1st Stage 2 Critérium International
2nd La Flèche Wallonne
7th Overall Tour de France
1981
1st Overall Setmana Catalana de Ciclisme
8th Overall Tour de France
1982
1st Stage 2 Paris–Nice
3rd Overall Vuelta a España

1st Stage 10

14th Overall Tour de France
1983
2nd Giro della Romagna
