= Stefan Mutter =

Swiss cyclist (born 1956)

Personal information
- Full name: Stefan Mutter
- Born: 3 October 1956 (age 70) Basel, Switzerland

Cycling career
- Sport: Cycling
- Current team: Retired
- Discipline: Road
- Role: Rider

Professional teams
- 1979–1980: TI–Raleigh–McGregor
- 1981: Cilo–Aufina
- 1982–1983: Puch–Eorotex–Campagnolo
- 1984: Cilo–Aufina
- 1985: Carrera–Inoxpran
- 1986–1988: PDM–Ultima–Concorde
- 1989–1990: Concorde–Campagnolo

Major wins
- Grand Tours Tour de France 1 individual stage (1982) 2 TTT stages (1979) Giro d'Italia 1 individual stage (1984) Vuelta a España Points classification (1982) One-day races and Classics National Road Race Championships (1981)
Medal record
Representing Switzerland
Men's road bicycle racing
World Championships
Bronze medal – third place	1978 Nürburg	Amateur road race

Stefan Mutter (born 3 October 1956) is a former professional road bicycle racer from Switzerland. He was the Swiss National Road Race champion in 1981.

== Major results ==
1977
5th Overall Tour de l'Avenir

1st Prologue

9th Overall GP Tell

1st Stage 4b (ITT)

1978
1st Giro del Mendrisiotto
UCI Road World Championships

3rd Amateur road race
3rd Team time trial

1979
1st Stages 4 (TTT) & 8 (TTT) Tour de France
1st Stage 1b (TTT) Paris–Nice
4th Overall Tour de Romandie
8th Overall Critérium du Dauphiné Libéré
1980
2nd Overall Paris–Nice
3rd Overall A Travers Lausanne
3rd Züri-Metzgete
8th Overall Tour of Belgium

1st Stage 2 (TTT)

9th GP Eddy Merckx
10th Overall Tour Méditerranéen
1981
1st Road race, National Road Championships
1st Overall Tour Méditerranéen

1st Stage 3a (ITT)

2nd Liège–Bastogne–Liège
4th Overall Tirreno–Adriatico
5th La Flèche Wallonne
7th Züri-Metzgete
8th Road race, UCI Road World Championships
9th Tour of Flanders
9th Coppa Bernocchi
9th Tour du Haut Var
9th Amstel Gold Race
9th Tour du Nord-Ouest
1982
1st Stage 9b Tour de France
3rd Liège–Bastogne–Liège
4th Paris–Roubaix
7th Overall Vuelta a España

1st Points classification

7th Overall Tour de Suisse
8th Overall Three Days of de Panne
1983
1st Visp–Grächen
2nd Overall Volta a la Comunitat Valenciana

1st Stage 3b

2nd Trofeo Luis Puig
5th Overall Tour de Suisse
5th Tre Valli Varesine
7th Overall Four Days of Dunkirk
8th Gent–Wevelgem
10th Road race, UCI Road World Championships
10th Züri-Metzgete
1984
1st Stage 4 Giro d'Italia
2nd Overall Settimana Internazionale di Coppi e Bartali
3rd Overall Tour Méditerranéen
4th Overall Etoile de Bessèges
4th Visp–Grächen
6th Coppa Placci
7th Overall Tirreno–Adriatico
7th Züri-Metzgete
7th Tour du Nord-Ouest
7th Gent–Wevelgem
1985
2nd Milano–Torino
3rd Overall Tirreno–Adriatico
7th GP du canton d'Argovie
7th Giro di Campania
7th Trofeo Laigueglia
8th Overall Settimana Internazionale di Coppi e Bartali
10th Tour of Flanders
1986
7th Overall Vuelta a Andalucía
1987
10th Rund um den Henninger Turm
1988
3rd Grand Prix de la Libération (TTT)

=== Grand Tour general classification results timeline ===
Grand Tour	1979	1980	1981	1982	1983	1984	1985	1986	1987
Giro d'Italia	—	—	39	—	42	33	44	—	—
Tour de France	75	—	—	21	—	—	DNF	—	DNF
Vuelta a España	—	—	—	7	—	—	—	19	—

Legend
—	Did not compete
DNF	Did not finish
