= Jaime Vilamajó =

Spanish cyclist

Personal information
- Born: 27 November 1959 (age 66) Tàrrega, Spain

Cycling career
- Sport: Cycling
- Role: Rider

Jaime Vilamajó (born 27 November 1959) is a former Spanish racing cyclist. He rode in twelve Grand Tours between 1981 and 1989.

== Major results ==
1982
1st Stage 4 Tour of the Basque Country
3rd Clasica de Sabiñánigo
8th Overall Vuelta a España
1983
1st Stage 2 Vuelta a los Valles Mineros
8th Overall Setmana Catalana de Ciclisme
1984
2nd Overall Vuelta a Andalucía
10th Overall Setmana Catalana de Ciclisme

1st Stage 1

1986
1st Stage 4 Vuelta a los Valles Mineros
3rd Overall Vuelta a Murcia
10th Overall Vuelta a Andalucía
1987
1st Stage 22 Vuelta a España
1988
1st Stage 4a Setmana Catalana de Ciclisme
