= Ángel Camarillo =

Spanish cyclist

Personal information
- Born: 11 March 1959 (age 67) Madrid, Spain

Cycling career
- Sport: Cycling
- Current team: Retired
- Discipline: Road
- Role: Rider

Professional teams
- 1981–1986: Zor–Helios–Novostil
- 1987–1989: Teka
- 1990–1992: CLAS–Cajastur

Major wins
- Grand Tours Vuelta a España 2 individual stages (1982, 1985)

Ángel Camarillo (born 11 March 1959) is a Spanish former professional racing cyclist. He rode in two editions of the Tour de France, six editions of the Giro d'Italia and ten editions of the Vuelta a España, winning two stages of the latter.

== Major results ==
1980
1st Overall Cinturón a Mallorca
1st Stage 2 Giro delle Regioni
1981
1st Stage 6 Vuelta a Castilla
1st Stage 2 Vuelta a Cantabria
3rd Circuito de Getxo
1982
1st Stage 5 Vuelta a España
1984
3rd Overall Volta a la Comunitat Valenciana
7th Clásica de San Sebastián
1985
1st Stage 8 Vuelta a España
3rd Overall Vuelta a Asturias

1st Stage 5

8th Clásica de San Sebastián
1986
1st GP Llodio
1st Stage 10b Vuelta a Colombia
1st Stage 2 Vuelta a La Rioja
1987
1st Clásica de Sabiñánigo
1st Stage 4a Tour of Galicia
1988
1st Stages 2 & 3b Vuelta a Burgos
2nd GP Navarra
