= Marc Gomez =

French cyclist (born 1954)

Personal information
- Born: 19 September 1954 (age 72) Rennes, France

Cycling career
- Sport: Cycling
- Current team: Retired
- Discipline: Road
- Role: rider

Professional teams
- 1982–1983: Wolber–Spidel
- 1984–1985: La Vie Claire
- 1986–1987: Reynolds
- 1988: Fagor–MBK
- 1989: Reynolds

Major wins
- Grand Tours Tour de France 1 TTT stage (1985) Vuelta a España 3 individual stages (1982, 1986) One-day races and Classics National Road Race Championships (1983) Milan–San Remo (1982)

Marc Gomez (born 19 September 1954) is a French former professional road bicycle racer. Born in Rennes, he has Spanish heritage, as his parents were born in Torrelavega, Spain. He was a professional from 1982 until 1989.

== Major results ==
1978
1st Overall Boucles de la Mayenne
3rd Overall Essor Breton
1979
1st Stage 1 Tour of Yugoslavia
1st Bordeaux–Saintes
3rd Grand Prix de Fougères
4th Overall Ruban Granitier Breton
1981
1st Bordeaux–Saintes
5th Overall Ruban Granitier Breton

1st Prologue and Stage 4b

1982
1st Milan–San Remo
1st Prologue Vuelta a España

Held after stages 1a to 3

3rd Paris–Camembert
4th Grand Prix de Rennes
4th Bordeaux–Paris
5th Overall Route Adélie de Vitré

1st Stage 1

7th Overall Paris–Bourges
7th Overall Étoile des Espoirs
8th Overall Grand Prix du Midi Libre
10th Critérium des As
1983
1st Road race, National Road Championships
5th Overall Tour de l'Aude

1st Stage 3

6th Rund um den Henninger Turm
10th Overall Route Adélie de Vitré
1984
1st Stage 12 Tour de l'Avenir
5th Paris–Bourges
9th GP Ouest-France
1985
1st Overall Tour of Sweden

1st Stage 1

1st Stage 3 (TTT) Tour de France
1st Stage 1 Tour du Limousin
5th Overall Route Adélie de Vitré

1st Mountain classification

1986
Vuelta a España

1st Stages 1 & 20
Held after stages 1 to 4

4th Overall Route Adélie de Vitré

1st Stage 1

1987
1st Stage 1 Vuelta a Castilla y León
3rd Grand Prix de Rennes
3rd Overall Tour du Limousin
1988
1st Stage 4 Volta a la Comunitat Valenciana
1st Stage 12 Volta a Portugal
9th GP Ouest-France
