= Luis Vicente Otin =

Spanish cyclist

Personal information
- Born: 13 May 1959 (age 67) Leiza, Spain

Cycling career
- Sport: Cycling
- Role: Rider

Luis Vicente Otin (born 13 May 1959) is a Spanish former professional racing cyclist. He rode in one edition of the Tour de France and three editions of the Vuelta a España.
