= Eorotex (cycling team) =

Former Swiss professional cycling team

Team information
- Registered: Switzerland
- Founded: 1982
- Disbanded: 1983
- Discipline: Road
- Bicycles: Puch (1982); Gitane (1983)

Key personnel
- General manager: Werner Arnold

Team name history
- 1982 1983: Puch–Eorotex–Campagnolo; Eorotex–Magniflex

Eorotex was a Swiss professional cycling team that existed from 1982 to 1983. It participated in the 1982 Tour de France, winning one stage (Stefan Mutter).
