= Marc Durant =

French cyclist

Personal information
- Born: 14 June 1955 (age 71) Saint-Sulpice-le-Guérétois, France

Cycling career
- Sport: Cycling
- Role: Rider

Marc Durant (born 14 June 1955) is a French former professional racing cyclist. He rode in five editions of the Tour de France and one edition of the Vuelta a España.
