= Safir (cycling team) =

Belgian cycling team

- 1984 jersey

Team information
- Registered: Belgium
- Founded: 1978
- Disbanded: 1988
- Discipline: Road

Team name history
- 1978 1979 1980 1981 1982 1983–1985 1986 1987 1988: Safir–Beyers–Ludo; Safir–Geuze–Saint-Louis–Ludo; Safir–Ludo; Safir–Ludo–Galli; Safir–Marc; Safir–Van de Ven; Roland–Van de Ven; Roland–Skala; Roland

Safir was a Belgian professional cycling team that existed from 1978 to 1988. A notable rider was Herman Van Springel, who won the one-day endurance race Bordeaux–Paris twice with the team.
