= Wolber–Spidel =

Cycling team (1981–1984)

Team information
- Registered: France
- Founded: 1981
- Disbanded: 1984
- Discipline: Road

Team name history
- 1981 1982–1983 1984: Puch–Wolber–Campagnolo; Wolber–Spidel; Système U

Wolber–Spidel was a French professional cycling team that existed from 1981 to 1984. It was a successor of the Puch–Sem–Campagnolo team of 1980. Notable victories include the 1982 Milan–San Remo with Marc Gomez and the 1984 Critérium du Dauphiné with Martín Ramírez.
