= 1986 Vuelta a España, Stage 11 to Stage 21 =

Cycling race stages

The 1986 Vuelta a España was the 41st edition of the Vuelta a España, one of cycling's Grand Tours. The Vuelta began in Palma de Mallorca, with a prologue individual time trial on 22 April, and Stage 11 occurred on 3 May with a stage from Valladolid. The race finished in Jerez de la Frontera on 13 May.

== Stage 11 ==
3 May 1986 — Valladolid to Valladolid, 29.1 km (18.1 mi) (ITT)

Stage 11 result

Rank	Rider	Team	Time
1	Charly Mottet (FRA)	Système U	36' 58"
2	Reimund Dietzen (FRG)	Teka	+ 13"
3	Sean Kelly (IRL)	Kas	+ 14"
4	Pello Ruiz Cabestany (ESP)	Seat–Orbea	+ 17"
5	Jean-Luc Vandenbroucke (BEL)	Kas	+ 25"
6	Álvaro Pino (ESP)	Zor–BH	+ 28"
7	José Rafael García Martínez (ESP)	Dormilón	+ 38"
8	Miguel Induráin (ESP)	Reynolds	+ 40"
9	Laurent Fignon (FRA)	Système U	+ 41"
10	Julián Gorospe (ESP)	Reynolds	+ 47"

General classification after Stage 11

Rank	Rider	Team	Time
1	Álvaro Pino (ESP)	Zor–BH	47h 25' 10"
2	Robert Millar (GBR)	Panasonic–Merckx–Agu	+ 33"
3	Pedro Delgado (ESP)	PDM–Ultima–Concorde	+ 1' 52"
4	Marino Lejarreta (ESP)	Seat–Orbea	+ 2' 20"
5	Sean Kelly (IRL)	Kas	+ 3' 33"
6	Reimund Dietzen (FRG)	Teka	+ 3' 52"
7	Pello Ruiz Cabestany (ESP)	Seat–Orbea	+ 4' 21"
8	Laurent Fignon (FRA)	Système U	+ 5' 19"
9	Charly Mottet (FRA)	Système U	+ 5' 49"
10	Fabio Parra (COL)	Café de Colombia–Varta	+ 6' 05"

== Stage 12 ==
4 May 1986 — Valladolid to Segovia, 258 km (160 mi)

Stage 12 result

Rank	Rider	Team	Time
1	Reimund Dietzen (FRG)	Teka	7h 15' 27"
2	Yvon Madiot (FRA)	Système U	s.t.
3	Anselmo Fuerte (ESP)	Zor–BH	s.t.
4	Ivan Ivanov (URS)	USSR (Amateur)	s.t.
5	Omar Hernández (COL)	Postobón–Manzana–Ryalcao	+ 3"
6	Fabio Parra (COL)	Café de Colombia–Varta	s.t.
7	Sean Kelly (IRL)	Kas	+ 35"
8	Stefan Mutter (SUI)	PDM–Ultima–Concorde	s.t.
9	Pello Ruiz Cabestany (ESP)	Seat–Orbea	s.t.
10	Juan Tomás Martínez (ESP)	Zahor Chocolates	s.t.

General classification after Stage 12

Rank	Rider	Team	Time
1	Álvaro Pino (ESP)	Zor–BH	54h 41' 02"
2	Robert Millar (GBR)	Panasonic–Merckx–Agu	+ 33"
3	Pedro Delgado (ESP)	PDM–Ultima–Concorde	+ 1' 52"
4	Marino Lejarreta (ESP)	Seat–Orbea	+ 2' 20"
5	Reimund Dietzen (FRG)	Teka	+ 3' 27"
6	Sean Kelly (IRL)	Kas	+ 3' 33"
7	Pello Ruiz Cabestany (ESP)	Seat–Orbea	+ 4' 21"
8	Laurent Fignon (FRA)	Système U	+ 5' 19"
9	Fabio Parra (COL)	Café de Colombia–Varta	+ 5' 41"
10	Anselmo Fuerte (ESP)	Zor–BH	+ 5' 53"

== Stage 13 ==
5 May 1986 — Segovia to Villalba, 148 km (92 mi)

Stage 13 result

Rank	Rider	Team	Time
1	Sean Kelly (IRL)	Kas	4h 02' 46"
2	Pello Ruiz Cabestany (ESP)	Seat–Orbea	s.t.
3	Reimund Dietzen (FRG)	Teka	s.t.
4	Charly Mottet (FRA)	Système U	s.t.
5	José Luis Laguía (ESP)	Reynolds	s.t.
6	Álvaro Pino (ESP)	Zor–BH	s.t.
7	Omar Hernández (COL)	Postobón–Manzana–Ryalcao	s.t.
8	Pedro Delgado (ESP)	PDM–Ultima–Concorde	s.t.
9	Iñaki Gastón (ESP)	Kas	s.t.
10	Marino Lejarreta (ESP)	Seat–Orbea	s.t.

General classification after Stage 13

Rank	Rider	Team	Time
1	Álvaro Pino (ESP)	Zor–BH	58h 43' 48"
2	Robert Millar (GBR)	Panasonic–Merckx–Agu	+ 33"
3	Pedro Delgado (ESP)	PDM–Ultima–Concorde	+ 1' 52"
4	Marino Lejarreta (ESP)	Seat–Orbea	+ 2' 20"
5	Reimund Dietzen (FRG)	Teka	+ 3' 27"
6	Sean Kelly (IRL)	Kas	+ 3' 33"
7	Pello Ruiz Cabestany (ESP)	Seat–Orbea	+ 4' 21"
8	Laurent Fignon (FRA)	Système U	+ 5' 19"
9	Fabio Parra (COL)	Café de Colombia–Varta	+ 5' 41"
10	Anselmo Fuerte (ESP)	Zor–BH	+ 5' 53"

== Stage 14 ==
6 May 1986 — Casino Gran Madrid (Torrelodones) to Leganés, 165 km (103 mi)

Stage 14 result

Rank	Rider	Team	Time
1	José Recio (ESP)	Kelme	4h 02' 49"
2	Sean Kelly (IRL)	Kas	+ 12"
3	Pello Ruiz Cabestany (ESP)	Seat–Orbea	s.t.
4	Stefan Mutter (SUI)	PDM–Ultima–Concorde	s.t.
5	Alfonso Gutiérrez (ESP)	Teka	s.t.
6	Jos Lammertink (NED)	Panasonic–Merckx–Agu	s.t.
7	Gert-Jan Theunisse (NED)	Panasonic–Merckx–Agu	s.t.
8	Viktor Demidenko (URS)	USSR (Amateur)	s.t.
9	Pascal Robert (FRA)	Système U	s.t.
10	José María Moreno Ramírez (ESP)	Dormilón	s.t.

General classification after Stage 14

Rank	Rider	Team	Time
1	Álvaro Pino (ESP)	Zor–BH	62h 46' 49"
2	Robert Millar (GBR)	Panasonic–Merckx–Agu	+ 33"
3	Pedro Delgado (ESP)	PDM–Ultima–Concorde	+ 1' 52"
4	Marino Lejarreta (ESP)	Seat–Orbea	+ 2' 20"
5	Reimund Dietzen (FRG)	Teka	+ 3' 27"
6	Sean Kelly (IRL)	Kas	+ 3' 33"
7	Pello Ruiz Cabestany (ESP)	Seat–Orbea	+ 4' 21"
8	Laurent Fignon (FRA)	Système U	+ 5' 19"
9	Anselmo Fuerte (ESP)	Zor–BH	+ 5' 53"
10	Fabio Parra (COL)	Café de Colombia–Varta	+ 7' 42"

== Stage 15 ==
7 May 1986 — Aranjuez to Albacete, 207 km (129 mi)

Stage 15 result

Rank	Rider	Team	Time
1	Juan Maria Eguiarte (ESP)	Zahor Chocolates	4h 39' 20"
2	Sean Kelly (IRL)	Kas	+ 26"
3	Manuel Jorge Domínguez (ESP)	Seat–Orbea	s.t.
4	Alfonso Gutiérrez (ESP)	Teka	s.t.
5	Pello Ruiz Cabestany (ESP)	Seat–Orbea	s.t.
6	Eddy Planckaert (BEL)	Panasonic–Merckx–Agu	s.t.
7	Christophe Lavainne (FRA)	Système U	s.t.
8	Jesús Suárez Cueva (ESP)	Zahor Chocolates	s.t.
9	Viktor Demidenko (URS)	USSR (Amateur)	s.t.
10	Imanol Murga (ESP)	Seat–Orbea	s.t.

General classification after Stage 15

Rank	Rider	Team	Time
1	Álvaro Pino (ESP)	Zor–BH	67h 26' 35"
2	Robert Millar (GBR)	Panasonic–Merckx–Agu	+ 33"
3	Pedro Delgado (ESP)	PDM–Ultima–Concorde	+ 1' 52"
4	Marino Lejarreta (ESP)	Seat–Orbea	+ 2' 20"
5	Reimund Dietzen (FRG)	Teka	+ 3' 27"
6	Sean Kelly (IRL)	Kas	+ 3' 33"
7	Pello Ruiz Cabestany (ESP)	Seat–Orbea	+ 4' 21"
8	Laurent Fignon (FRA)	Système U	+ 5' 19"
9	Anselmo Fuerte (ESP)	Zor–BH	+ 5' 53"
10	Fabio Parra (COL)	Café de Colombia–Varta	+ 7' 42"

== Stage 16 ==
8 May 1986 — Albacete to Jaén, 264 km (164 mi)

Stage 16 result

Rank	Rider	Team	Time
1	Alain Bondue (FRA)	Système U	6h 39' 58"
2	Sergei Sukhoruchenkov (URS)	USSR (Amateur)	+ 6"
3	Lucien Van Impe (BEL)	Dormilón	+ 12"
4	Sean Kelly (IRL)	Kas	+ 15"
5	Laurent Fignon (FRA)	Système U	s.t.
6	Omar Hernández (COL)	Postobón–Manzana–Ryalcao	s.t.
7	Pello Ruiz Cabestany (ESP)	Seat–Orbea	s.t.
8	Stefan Mutter (SUI)	PDM–Ultima–Concorde	s.t.
9	José Patrocinio Jiménez (COL)	Café de Colombia–Varta	s.t.
10	Yury Kashirin (URS)	USSR (Amateur)	s.t.

General classification after Stage 16

Rank	Rider	Team	Time
1	Álvaro Pino (ESP)	Zor–BH	74h 06' 48"
2	Robert Millar (GBR)	Panasonic–Merckx–Agu	+ 33"
3	Pedro Delgado (ESP)	PDM–Ultima–Concorde	+ 1' 52"
4	Marino Lejarreta (ESP)	Seat–Orbea	+ 2' 20"
5	Reimund Dietzen (FRG)	Teka	+ 3' 27"
6	Sean Kelly (IRL)	Kas	+ 3' 33"
7	Pello Ruiz Cabestany (ESP)	Seat–Orbea	+ 4' 21"
8	Laurent Fignon (FRA)	Système U	+ 5' 19"
9	Anselmo Fuerte (ESP)	Zor–BH	+ 5' 53"
10	Fabio Parra (COL)	Café de Colombia–Varta	+ 7' 42"

== Stage 17 ==
9 May 1986 — Jaén to Sierra Nevada, 172 km (107 mi)

Stage 17 result

Rank	Rider	Team	Time
1	Felipe Yáñez (ESP)	Zahor Chocolates	5h 39' 37"
2	José Patrocinio Jiménez (COL)	Café de Colombia–Varta	+ 10"
3	Fabio Parra (COL)	Café de Colombia–Varta	+ 1' 09"
4	Enrique Aja (ESP)	Teka	+ 1' 30"
5	Robert Millar (GBR)	Panasonic–Merckx–Agu	+ 2' 36"
6	Álvaro Pino (ESP)	Zor–BH	s.t.
7	Carlos Emiro Gutiérrez (COL)	Kelme	+ 2' 53"
8	Sean Kelly (IRL)	Kas	+ 3' 27"
9	Reimund Dietzen (FRG)	Teka	+ 4' 14"
10	Anselmo Fuerte (ESP)	Zor–BH	+ 4' 24"

General classification after Stage 17

Rank	Rider	Team	Time
1	Álvaro Pino (ESP)	Zor–BH	79h 49' 01"
2	Robert Millar (GBR)	Panasonic–Merckx–Agu	+ 33"
3	Sean Kelly (IRL)	Kas	+ 4' 24"
4	Reimund Dietzen (FRG)	Teka	+ 5' 05"
5	Marino Lejarreta (ESP)	Seat–Orbea	+ 6' 07"
6	Fabio Parra (COL)	Café de Colombia–Varta	+ 6' 15"
7	Pello Ruiz Cabestany (ESP)	Seat–Orbea	+ 6' 51"
8	Laurent Fignon (FRA)	Système U	+ 7' 22"
9	Anselmo Fuerte (ESP)	Zor–BH	+ 7' 41"
10	Pedro Delgado (ESP)	PDM–Ultima–Concorde	+ 9' 38"

== Stage 18 ==
10 May 1986 — Granada to Benalmádena, 191 km (119 mi)

Stage 18 result

Rank	Rider	Team	Time
1	Viktor Demidenko (URS)	USSR (Amateur)	4h 39' 57"
2	Carlos Emiro Gutiérrez (COL)	Kelme	+ 10"
3	José Del Ramo Nunez (ESP)	Dormilón	+ 35"
4	Alain Bondue (FRA)	Système U	+ 11' 32"
5	Benny Van Brabant (BEL)	Dormilón	+ 11' 33"
6	Guido Van Calster (BEL)	Zor–BH	s.t.
7	Christophe Lavainne (FRA)	Système U	s.t.
8	Jesús Suárez Cueva (ESP)	Zahor Chocolates	s.t.
9	Sabino Angoitia (ESP)	Zahor Chocolates	s.t.
10	Omar Hernández (COL)	Postobón–Manzana–Ryalcao	s.t.

General classification after Stage 18

Rank	Rider	Team	Time
1	Álvaro Pino (ESP)	Zor–BH	84h 40' 31"
2	Robert Millar (GBR)	Panasonic–Merckx–Agu	+ 33"
3	Sean Kelly (IRL)	Kas	+ 4' 43"
4	Reimund Dietzen (FRG)	Teka	+ 5' 05"
5	Marino Lejarreta (ESP)	Seat–Orbea	+ 6' 07"
6	Fabio Parra (COL)	Café de Colombia–Varta	+ 6' 15"
7	Pello Ruiz Cabestany (ESP)	Seat–Orbea	+ 6' 51"
8	Laurent Fignon (FRA)	Système U	+ 7' 22"
9	Anselmo Fuerte (ESP)	Zor–BH	+ 7' 41"
10	Pedro Delgado (ESP)	PDM–Ultima–Concorde	+ 9' 38"

== Stage 19 ==
11 May 1986 — Benalmádena to Puerto Real, 234 km (145 mi)

Stage 19 result

Rank	Rider	Team	Time
1	Jesús Blanco Villar (ESP)	Teka	5h 00' 26"
2	Charly Mottet (FRA)	Système U	s.t.
3	Iñaki Gastón (ESP)	Kas	s.t.
4	Enrique Aja (ESP)	Teka	s.t.
5	Carlos Hernández Bailo (ESP)	Reynolds	s.t.
6	Felipe Yáñez (ESP)	Zahor Chocolates	s.t.
7	Gerard Veldscholten (NED)	PDM–Ultima–Concorde	+ 3"
8	Philippe Poissonnier (FRA)	Kas	+ 6"
9	José Recio (ESP)	Kelme	+ 58"
10	Marc Gomez (FRA)	Reynolds	s.t.

General classification after Stage 19

Rank	Rider	Team	Time
1	Álvaro Pino (ESP)	Zor–BH	89h 42' 25"
2	Robert Millar (GBR)	Panasonic–Merckx–Agu	+ 33"
3	Sean Kelly (IRL)	Kas	+ 4' 54"
4	Reimund Dietzen (FRG)	Teka	+ 5' 05"
5	Marino Lejarreta (ESP)	Seat–Orbea	+ 6' 07"
6	Fabio Parra (COL)	Café de Colombia–Varta	+ 6' 15"
7	Pello Ruiz Cabestany (ESP)	Seat–Orbea	+ 6' 51"
8	Laurent Fignon (FRA)	Système U	+ 7' 22"
9	Anselmo Fuerte (ESP)	Zor–BH	+ 7' 41"
10	Pedro Delgado (ESP)	PDM–Ultima–Concorde	+ 9' 38"

== Stage 20 ==
12 May 1986 — Puerto Real to Jerez de la Frontera, 239 km (149 mi)

Stage 20 result

Rank	Rider	Team	Time
1	Marc Gomez (FRA)	Reynolds	8h 07' 49"
2	Miguel Ángel Iglesias (ESP)	Kelme	s.t.
3	Sean Kelly (IRL)	Kas	+ 7"
4	Benny Van Brabant (BEL)	Dormilón	s.t.
5	Vladimir Muravski (URS)	USSR (Amateur)	s.t.
6	Jesús Suárez Cueva (ESP)	Zahor Chocolates	s.t.
7	Stefan Mutter (SUI)	PDM–Ultima–Concorde	s.t.
8	Guido Van Calster (BEL)	Zor–BH	s.t.
9	Viktor Demidenko (URS)	USSR (Amateur)	s.t.
10	Sabino Angoitia (ESP)	Zahor Chocolates	s.t.

General classification after Stage 20

Rank	Rider	Team	Time
1	Álvaro Pino (ESP)	Zor–BH	97h 50' 21"
2	Robert Millar (GBR)	Panasonic–Merckx–Agu	+ 33"
3	Sean Kelly (IRL)	Kas	+ 4' 54"
4	Reimund Dietzen (FRG)	Teka	+ 5' 05"
5	Marino Lejarreta (ESP)	Seat–Orbea	+ 6' 07"
6	Fabio Parra (COL)	Café de Colombia–Varta	+ 6' 15"
7	Pello Ruiz Cabestany (ESP)	Seat–Orbea	+ 6' 51"
8	Laurent Fignon (FRA)	Système U	+ 7' 22"
9	Anselmo Fuerte (ESP)	Zor–BH	+ 7' 41"
10	Pedro Delgado (ESP)	PDM–Ultima–Concorde	+ 9' 38"

== Stage 21 ==
13 May 1986 — Jerez de la Frontera to Jerez de la Frontera, 22 km (14 mi) (ITT)

Stage 21 result

Rank	Rider	Team	Time
1	Álvaro Pino (ESP)	Zor–BH	25' 43"
2	Laurent Fignon (FRA)	Système U	+ 7"
3	Sean Kelly (IRL)	Kas	+ 25"
4	Robert Millar (GBR)	Panasonic–Merckx–Agu	+ 33"
5	Pello Ruiz Cabestany (ESP)	Seat–Orbea	+ 35"
6	Miguel Induráin (ESP)	Reynolds	s.t.
7	Iñaki Gastón (ESP)	Kas	+ 41"
8	Reimund Dietzen (FRG)	Teka	+ 53"
9	Jean-Luc Vandenbroucke (BEL)	Kas	+ 1' 02"
10	Marino Lejarreta (ESP)	Seat–Orbea	+ 1' 05"

General classification after Stage 21

Rank	Rider	Team	Time
1	Álvaro Pino (ESP)	Zor–BH	98h 16' 04"
2	Robert Millar (GBR)	Panasonic–Merckx–Agu	+ 1' 06"
3	Sean Kelly (IRL)	Kas	+ 5' 19"
4	Reimund Dietzen (FRG)	Teka	+ 5' 58"
5	Marino Lejarreta (ESP)	Seat–Orbea	+ 7' 12"
6	Pello Ruiz Cabestany (ESP)	Seat–Orbea	+ 7' 26"
7	Laurent Fignon (FRA)	Système U	+ 7' 29"
8	Fabio Parra (COL)	Café de Colombia–Varta	+ 7' 44"
9	Anselmo Fuerte (ESP)	Zor–BH	+ 10' 50"
10	Pedro Delgado (ESP)	PDM–Ultima–Concorde	+ 11' 50"
