= 1986 Vuelta a España, Prologue to Stage 10 =

Cycling race stages

The 1986 Vuelta a España was the 41st edition of the Vuelta a España, one of cycling's Grand Tours. The Vuelta began in Palma de Mallorca, with a prologue individual time trial on 22 April, and Stage 10 occurred on 2 May with a stage to Palencia. The race finished in Jerez de la Frontera on 13 May.

== Prologue ==
22 April 1986 — Palma de Mallorca to Palma de Mallorca, 5.7 km (3.5 mi) (ITT)

Prologue result and general classification after Prologue

Rank	Rider	Team	Time
1	Thierry Marie (FRA)	Système U	6' 43"
2	Allan Peiper (AUS)	Panasonic–Merckx–Agu	+ 6"
3	Miguel Induráin (ESP)	Reynolds	+ 7"
4	Alain Bondue (FRA)	Système U	+ 10"
5	Laurent Fignon (FRA)	Système U	+ 11"
6	Jesús Blanco Villar (ESP)	Teka	s.t.
7	Sean Kelly (IRL)	Kas	+ 12"
8	José Recio (ESP)	Kelme	+ 14"
9	Charly Mottet (FRA)	Système U	s.t.
10	Jean-Luc Vandenbroucke (BEL)	Kas	s.t.

== Stage 1 ==
23 April 1986 — Palma de Mallorca to Palma de Mallorca, 190 km (120 mi)

Stage 1 result

Rank	Rider	Team	Time
1	Marc Gomez (FRA)	Reynolds	4h 44' 37"
2	Manuel Jorge Domínguez (ESP)	Seat–Orbea	+ 2' 33"
3	Sean Kelly (IRL)	Kas	s.t.
4	Vladimir Muravski (URS)	USSR (Amateur)	s.t.
5	Pello Ruiz Cabestany (ESP)	Seat–Orbea	s.t.
6	Stefan Mutter (SUI)	PDM–Ultima–Concorde	s.t.
7	Miguel Ángel Iglesias (ESP)	Kelme	s.t.
8	Zbigniew Ludwiniak (POL)	Poland (Amateur)	s.t.
9	Dominique Lecrocq (FRA)	Système U	s.t.
10	Roberto Córdoba (ESP)	Dormilón	s.t.

General classification after Stage 1

Rank	Rider	Team	Time
1	Marc Gomez (FRA)	Reynolds	4h 51' 40"
2	Thierry Marie (FRA)	Système U	+ 2' 13"
3	Allan Peiper (AUS)	Panasonic–Merckx–Agu	+ 2' 19"
4	Miguel Induráin (ESP)	Reynolds	+ 2' 20"
5	Jesús Blanco Villar (ESP)	Teka	+ 2' 24"
6	Laurent Fignon (FRA)	Système U	s.t.
7	Sean Kelly (IRL)	Kas	+ 2' 25"
8	Pello Ruiz Cabestany (ESP)	Seat–Orbea	+ 2' 27"
9	Charly Mottet (FRA)	Système U	s.t.
10	José Recio (ESP)	Kelme	s.t.

== Stage 2 ==
24 April 1986 — Barcelona to Barcelona, 182 km (113 mi)

Stage 2 result

Rank	Rider	Team	Time
1	Manuel Jorge Domínguez (ESP)	Seat–Orbea	4h 24' 45"
2	Pello Ruiz Cabestany (ESP)	Seat–Orbea	s.t.
3	Sean Kelly (IRL)	Kas	s.t.
4	Stefan Mutter (SUI)	PDM–Ultima–Concorde	s.t.
5	Laurent Fignon (FRA)	Système U	s.t.
6	Marino Lejarreta (ESP)	Seat–Orbea	s.t.
7	Pedro Delgado (ESP)	PDM–Ultima–Concorde	s.t.
8	Andrei Vedernikov (URS)	USSR (Amateur)	s.t.
9	Federico Echave (ESP)	Teka	s.t.
10	Néstor Mora (COL)	Postobón–Manzana–Ryalcao	s.t.

General classification after Stage 2

Rank	Rider	Team	Time
1	Marc Gomez (FRA)	Reynolds	9h 16' 25"
2	Thierry Marie (FRA)	Système U	+ 2' 23"
3	Jesús Blanco Villar (ESP)	Teka	+ 2' 24"
4	Laurent Fignon (FRA)	Système U	s.t.
5	Sean Kelly (IRL)	Kas	+ 2' 25"
6	Pello Ruiz Cabestany (ESP)	Seat–Orbea	+ 2' 27"
7	Charly Mottet (FRA)	Système U	s.t.
8	José Recio (ESP)	Kelme	s.t.
9	Álvaro Pino (ESP)	Zor–BH	+ 2' 28"
10	Reimund Dietzen (FRG)	Teka	s.t.

== Stage 3 ==
25 April 1986 — Lleida to Zaragoza, 212 km (132 mi)

Stage 3 result

Rank	Rider	Team	Time
1	Eddy Planckaert (BEL)	Panasonic–Merckx–Agu	5h 36' 53"
2	Benny Van Brabant (BEL)	Dormilón	s.t.
3	Stefan Mutter (SUI)	PDM–Ultima–Concorde	s.t.
4	Jesús Suárez Cueva (ESP)	Zahor Chocolates	s.t.
5	Wim Arras (BEL)	PDM–Ultima–Concorde	s.t.
6	Alfonso Gutiérrez (ESP)	Teka	s.t.
7	Pello Ruiz Cabestany (ESP)	Seat–Orbea	s.t.
8	Manuel Jorge Domínguez (ESP)	Seat–Orbea	s.t.
9	Sabino Angoitia (ESP)	Zahor Chocolates	s.t.
10	Miguel Ángel Iglesias (ESP)	Kelme	s.t.

General classification after Stage 3

Rank	Rider	Team	Time
1	Marc Gomez (FRA)	Reynolds	14h 53' 18"
2	Thierry Marie (FRA)	Système U	+ 2' 23"
3	Jesús Blanco Villar (ESP)	Teka	+ 2' 24"
4	Laurent Fignon (FRA)	Système U	s.t.
5	Sean Kelly (IRL)	Kas	+ 2' 25"
6	Pello Ruiz Cabestany (ESP)	Seat–Orbea	+ 2' 27"
7	Charly Mottet (FRA)	Système U	s.t.
8	José Recio (ESP)	Kelme	s.t.
9	Álvaro Pino (ESP)	Zor–BH	+ 2' 28"
10	Reimund Dietzen (FRG)	Teka	s.t.

== Stage 4 ==
26 April 1986 — Zaragoza to Logroño, 192 km (119 mi)

Stage 4 result

Rank	Rider	Team	Time
1	Alfonso Gutiérrez (ESP)	Teka	5h 14' 39"
2	Eddy Planckaert (BEL)	Panasonic–Merckx–Agu	s.t.
3	Wim Arras (BEL)	PDM–Ultima–Concorde	s.t.
4	Jesús Suárez Cueva (ESP)	Zahor Chocolates	s.t.
5	Dominique Lecrocq (FRA)	Système U	s.t.
6	Vladimir Muravski (URS)	USSR (Amateur)	s.t.
7	Stefan Mutter (SUI)	PDM–Ultima–Concorde	s.t.
8	José Coll Pontanilla (ESP)	Colchón CR	s.t.
9	José María Moreno Ramírez (ESP)	Dormilón	s.t.
10	Manuel Jorge Domínguez (ESP)	Seat–Orbea	s.t.

General classification after Stage 4

Rank	Rider	Team	Time
1	Marc Gomez (FRA)	Reynolds	20h 07' 57"
2	Thierry Marie (FRA)	Système U	+ 2' 23"
3	Jesús Blanco Villar (ESP)	Teka	+ 2' 24"
4	Laurent Fignon (FRA)	Système U	s.t.
5	Sean Kelly (IRL)	Kas	+ 2' 25"
6	Pello Ruiz Cabestany (ESP)	Seat–Orbea	+ 2' 27"
7	Charly Mottet (FRA)	Système U	s.t.
8	José Recio (ESP)	Kelme	s.t.
9	Álvaro Pino (ESP)	Zor–BH	+ 2' 28"
10	Reimund Dietzen (FRG)	Teka	s.t.

== Stage 5 ==
27 April 1986 — Haro to Santander, 202 km (126 mi)

Stage 5 result

Rank	Rider	Team	Time
1	Jesús Blanco Villar (ESP)	Teka	5h 52' 41"
2	Eddy Planckaert (BEL)	Panasonic–Merckx–Agu	s.t.
3	Andrei Vedernikov (URS)	USSR (Amateur)	s.t.
4	Pello Ruiz Cabestany (ESP)	Seat–Orbea	s.t.
5	Stefan Mutter (SUI)	PDM–Ultima–Concorde	s.t.
6	Imanol Murga (ESP)	Seat–Orbea	s.t.
7	Federico Echave (ESP)	Teka	s.t.
8	Enrique Aja (ESP)	Teka	s.t.
9	Álvaro Pino (ESP)	Zor–BH	s.t.
10	Reimund Dietzen (FRG)	Teka	s.t.

General classification after Stage 5

Rank	Rider	Team	Time
1	Jesús Blanco Villar (ESP)	Teka	26h 03' 02"
2	Laurent Fignon (FRA)	Système U	s.t.
3	Sean Kelly (IRL)	Kas	+ 1"
4	Pello Ruiz Cabestany (ESP)	Seat–Orbea	+ 3"
5	Charly Mottet (FRA)	Système U	s.t.
6	José Recio (ESP)	Kelme	s.t.
7	Álvaro Pino (ESP)	Zor–BH	+ 4"
8	Reimund Dietzen (FRG)	Teka	s.t.
9	Éric Boyer (FRA)	Système U	s.t.
10	Yvon Madiot (FRA)	Système U	+ 9"

== Stage 6 ==
28 April 1986 — Santander to Lakes of Covadonga, 191 km (119 mi)

Stage 6 result

Rank	Rider	Team	Time
1	Robert Millar (GBR)	Panasonic–Merckx–Agu	5h 54' 17"
2	Pedro Delgado (ESP)	PDM–Ultima–Concorde	+ 9"
3	Reimund Dietzen (FRG)	Teka	+ 23"
4	Álvaro Pino (ESP)	Zor–BH	s.t.
5	Fabio Parra (COL)	Café de Colombia–Varta	+ 31"
6	Francisco Rodríguez Maldonado (COL)	Zor–BH	+ 40"
7	Yvon Madiot (FRA)	Système U	s.t.
8	Anselmo Fuerte (ESP)	Zor–BH	+ 1' 17"
9	José Luis Laguía (ESP)	Reynolds	+ 1' 19"
10	Marino Lejarreta (ESP)	Seat–Orbea	+ 1' 22"

General classification after Stage 6

Rank	Rider	Team	Time
1	Robert Millar (GBR)	Panasonic–Merckx–Agu	31h 57' 33"
2	Pedro Delgado (ESP)	PDM–Ultima–Concorde	+ 9"
3	Álvaro Pino (ESP)	Zor–BH	+ 13"
4	Reimund Dietzen (FRG)	Teka	s.t.
5	Yvon Madiot (FRA)	Système U	+ 35"
6	Fabio Parra (COL)	Café de Colombia–Varta	s.t.
7	Francisco Rodríguez Maldonado (COL)	Zor–BH	+ 43"
8	Sean Kelly (IRL)	Kas	+ 1' 15"
9	Anselmo Fuerte (ESP)	Zor–BH	+ 1' 21"
10	José Luis Laguía (ESP)	Reynolds	+ 1' 24"

== Stage 7 ==
29 April 1986 — Cangas de Onís to Oviedo, 180 km (110 mi)

Stage 7 result

Rank	Rider	Team	Time
1	Eddy Planckaert (BEL)	Panasonic–Merckx–Agu	4h 56' 33"
2	Benny Van Brabant (BEL)	Dormilón	s.t.
3	Sean Kelly (IRL)	Kas	s.t.
4	Pello Ruiz Cabestany (ESP)	Seat–Orbea	s.t.
5	Omar Hernández (COL)	Postobón–Manzana–Ryalcao	s.t.
6	Stefan Mutter (SUI)	PDM–Ultima–Concorde	s.t.
7	Álvaro Pino (ESP)	Zor–BH	s.t.
8	Viktor Demidenko (URS)	USSR (Amateur)	s.t.
9	Imanol Murga (ESP)	Seat–Orbea	s.t.
10	Manuel Jorge Domínguez (ESP)	Seat–Orbea	s.t.

General classification after Stage 7

Rank	Rider	Team	Time
1	Robert Millar (GBR)	Panasonic–Merckx–Agu	36h 54' 06"
2	Pedro Delgado (ESP)	PDM–Ultima–Concorde	+ 9"
3	Álvaro Pino (ESP)	Zor–BH	+ 13"
4	Reimund Dietzen (FRG)	Teka	s.t.
5	Yvon Madiot (FRA)	Système U	+ 35"
6	Fabio Parra (COL)	Café de Colombia–Varta	s.t.
7	Francisco Rodríguez Maldonado (COL)	Zor–BH	+ 43"
8	Sean Kelly (IRL)	Kas	+ 1' 09"
9	Anselmo Fuerte (ESP)	Zor–BH	+ 1' 21"
10	José Luis Laguía (ESP)	Reynolds	+ 1' 24"

== Stage 8 ==
30 April 1986 — Oviedo to Alto del Naranco, 9.7 km (6.0 mi) (ITT)

Stage 8 result

Rank	Rider	Team	Time
1	Marino Lejarreta (ESP)	Seat–Orbea	18' 28"
2	Sean Kelly (IRL)	Kas	+ 3"
3	Álvaro Pino (ESP)	Zor–BH	+ 4"
4	Robert Millar (GBR)	Panasonic–Merckx–Agu	+ 9"
5	Yvon Madiot (FRA)	Système U	+ 13"
6	Fabio Parra (COL)	Café de Colombia–Varta	+ 19"
7	Reimund Dietzen (FRG)	Teka	+ 21"
8	Pello Ruiz Cabestany (ESP)	Seat–Orbea	+ 22"
9	Julián Gorospe (ESP)	Reynolds	+ 30"
10	Pedro Delgado (ESP)	PDM–Ultima–Concorde	+ 33"

General classification after Stage 8

Rank	Rider	Team	Time
1	Robert Millar (GBR)	Panasonic–Merckx–Agu	37h 12' 43"
2	Álvaro Pino (ESP)	Zor–BH	+ 8"
3	Reimund Dietzen (FRG)	Teka	+ 25"
4	Pedro Delgado (ESP)	PDM–Ultima–Concorde	+ 33"
5	Yvon Madiot (FRA)	Système U	+ 39"
6	Fabio Parra (COL)	Café de Colombia–Varta	+ 45"
7	Sean Kelly (IRL)	Kas	+ 1' 03"
8	Marino Lejarreta (ESP)	Seat–Orbea	+ 1' 17"
9	Anselmo Fuerte (ESP)	Zor–BH	+ 1' 47"
10	Francisco Rodríguez Maldonado (COL)	Zor–BH	+ 1' 53"

== Stage 9 ==
1 May 1986 — Oviedo – San Isidro, 180 km (110 mi)

Stage 9 result

Rank	Rider	Team	Time
1	Charly Mottet (FRA)	Système U	4h 53' 03"
2	Abelardo Rondón (COL)	Café de Colombia–Varta	+ 11"
3	Pello Ruiz Cabestany (ESP)	Seat–Orbea	+ 20"
4	Pablo Wilches (COL)	Postobón–Manzana–Ryalcao	s.t.
5	Francisco Rodríguez Maldonado (COL)	Zor–BH	+ 24"
6	Marino Lejarreta (ESP)	Seat–Orbea	s.t.
7	Robert Millar (GBR)	Panasonic–Merckx–Agu	s.t.
8	Álvaro Pino (ESP)	Zor–BH	s.t.
9	Peter Winnen (NED)	Panasonic–Merckx–Agu	s.t.
10	Pedro Delgado (ESP)	PDM–Ultima–Concorde	s.t.

General classification after Stage 9

Rank	Rider	Team	Time
1	Robert Millar (GBR)	Panasonic–Merckx–Agu	42h 06' 10"
2	Álvaro Pino (ESP)	Zor–BH	+ 8"
3	Reimund Dietzen (FRG)	Teka	+ 25"
4	Pedro Delgado (ESP)	PDM–Ultima–Concorde	+ 33"
5	Fabio Parra (COL)	Café de Colombia–Varta	+ 45"
6	Marino Lejarreta (ESP)	Seat–Orbea	+ 1' 17"
7	Anselmo Fuerte (ESP)	Zor–BH	+ 1' 47"
8	Francisco Rodríguez Maldonado (COL)	Zor–BH	+ 1' 53"
9	Charly Mottet (FRA)	Système U	+ 2' 35"
10	Omar Hernández (COL)	Postobón–Manzana–Ryalcao	s.t.

== Stage 10 ==
2 May 1986 — San Isidro to Palencia, 193 km (120 mi)

Stage 10 result

Rank	Rider	Team	Time
1	Sean Kelly (IRL)	Kas	4h 41' 26"
2	Imanol Murga (ESP)	Seat–Orbea	s.t.
3	Stefan Mutter (SUI)	PDM–Ultima–Concorde	s.t.
4	Pascal Jules (FRA)	Seat–Orbea	s.t.
5	Gerrie Knetemann (NED)	PDM–Ultima–Concorde	s.t.
6	Ricardo Martínez Matey (ESP)	Kelme	s.t.
7	Pello Ruiz Cabestany (ESP)	Seat–Orbea	s.t.
8	Laurent Fignon (FRA)	Système U	s.t.
9	Pedro Delgado (ESP)	PDM–Ultima–Concorde	s.t.
10	Álvaro Pino (ESP)	Zor–BH	s.t.

General classification after Stage 10

Rank	Rider	Team	Time
1	Robert Millar (GBR)	Panasonic–Merckx–Agu	46h 47' 36"
2	Álvaro Pino (ESP)	Zor–BH	+ 8"
3	Pedro Delgado (ESP)	PDM–Ultima–Concorde	+ 33"
4	Marino Lejarreta (ESP)	Seat–Orbea	+ 1' 17"
5	Sean Kelly (IRL)	Kas	+ 3' 55"
6	Reimund Dietzen (FRG)	Teka	+ 4' 15"
7	Fabio Parra (COL)	Café de Colombia–Varta	+ 4' 35"
8	Pello Ruiz Cabestany (ESP)	Seat–Orbea	+ 4' 40"
9	Laurent Fignon (FRA)	Système U	+ 5' 14"
10	Anselmo Fuerte (ESP)	Zor–BH	+ 5' 37"
