= Clásica de San Sebastián =

Cycling road race held in San Sebastián, Spain

Race details
- Date: Late July or early August
- Region: Basque Country, Spain
- English name: Classic of San Sebastián
- Local name(s): Clásica de San Sebastián (in Spanish); Donostia-Donostia Klasikoa (in Basque)
- Nickname: Ronda Donostiarra
- Discipline: Road
- Competition: UCI World Tour
- Type: One-day
- Organiser: Organizaciones Ciclistas Euskadi
- Race director: José Luis Arrieta
- Web site: www.klasikoa.eus

History
- First edition: 1981
- Editions: 45 (as of 2026)
- First winner: Marino Lejarreta (ESP)
- Most wins: Remco Evenepoel (BEL) (4 wins)
- Most recent: Remco Evenepoel (BEL)

The Donostia-Donostia Klasikoa — Clásica San Sebastián-San Sebastián (San Sebastián Classic) is a one-day professional men's bicycle road race in the Basque Country that has been held every summer since 1981 in San Sebastián. It is the most important one-day race in Spain, and contributes points towards the UCI World Ranking.

Clásica de San Sebastián is known for its winding, undulating terrain which favours aggressive riding, favouring climbers. It includes the tough Jaizkibel and Erlaitz climbs, usually the decisive points of the race. It is one of the three summer classics that form part of the UCI World Tour calendar, along with the Laurentian Classics.

Usually the protagonists of the Clásica de San Sebastián are those who, until a few days before the race have been competing on the roads of the Tour de France, given the proximity of dates of the two competitions. There are many Klasikoa winners who also have a Grand Tour in their palmares.

It has always started and finished in San Sebastián, although the initial and intermediate stretches have varied throughout its history, so its total mileage has not been the same, although it has almost always been around 230 km. The race traditionally finishes at the Boulevard de San Sebastián a major street in the centre of the city.

It is organized by Organizaciones Ciclistas Euskadi, after the merger of the Euskal Bizikleta with the Tour of the Basque Country in 2009. A women's race was held in 2019 and 2021, before being replaced by the Itzulia Women stage race from 2022 onwards.

== History ==
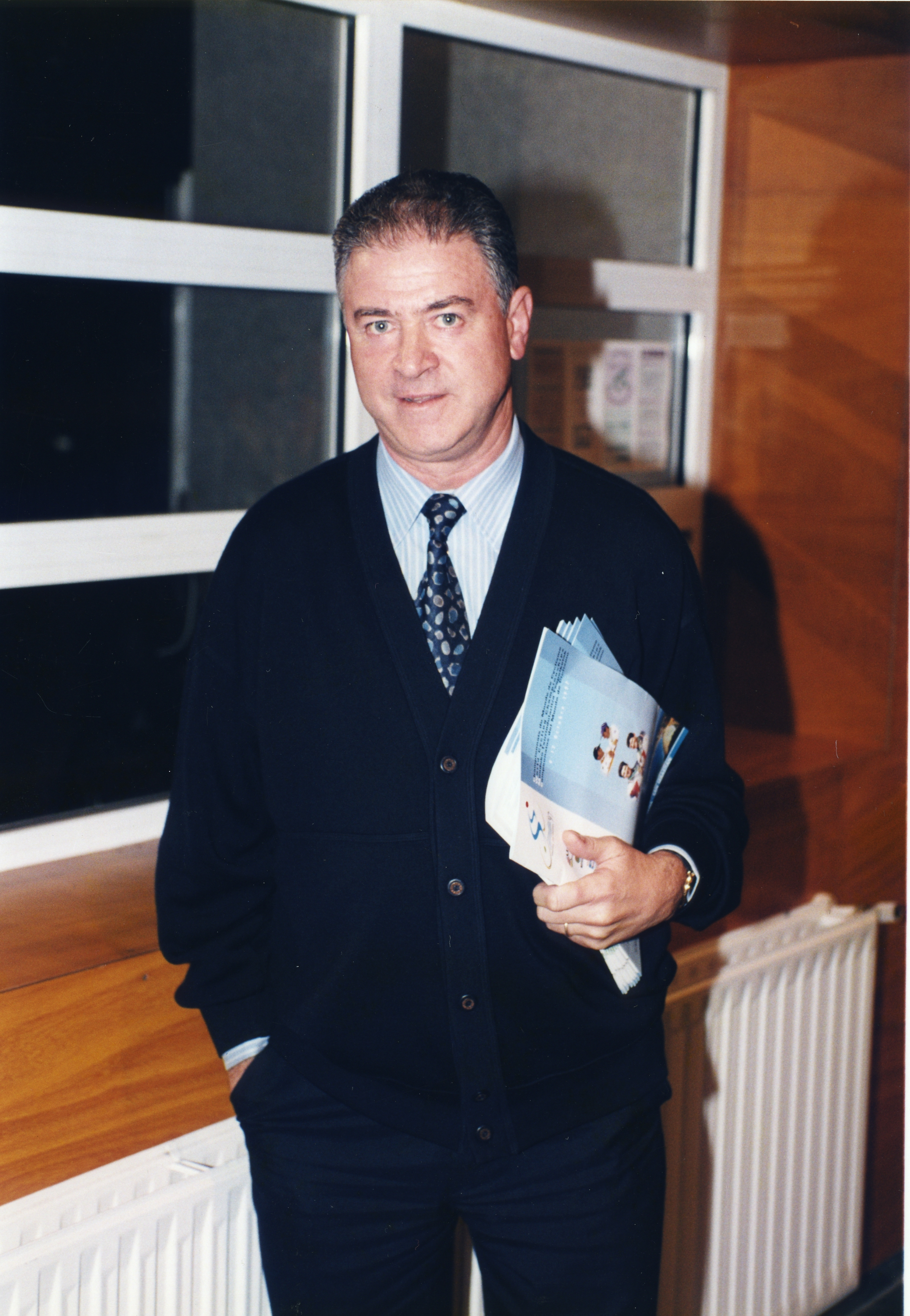
Jaime Ugarte (1996)

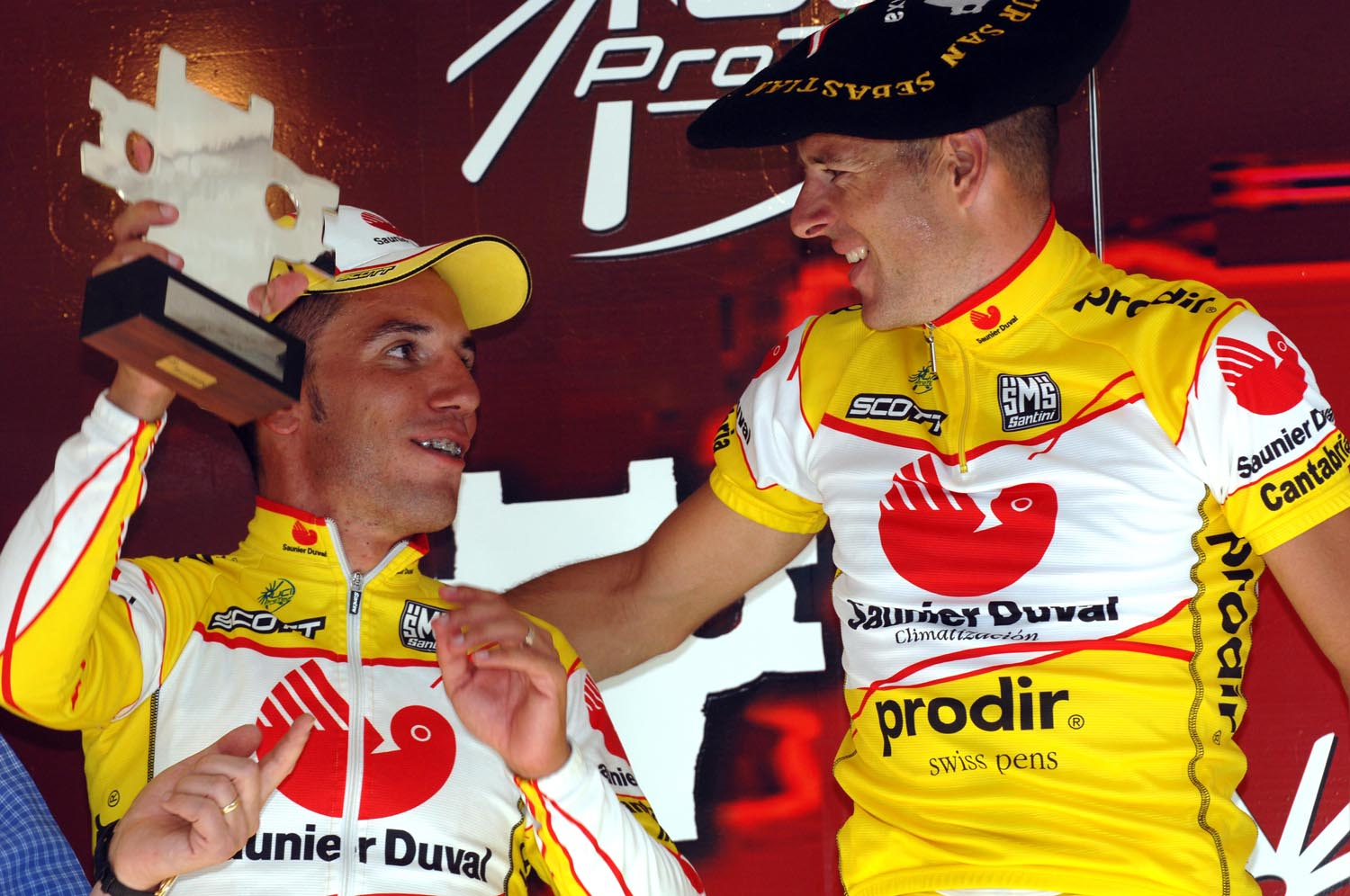
Joaquim Rodríguez and his teammate Constantino Zaballa, wearing the txapela, usually given to winners in the Basque Country.

Clásica de San Sebastián is the most important one-day race in Spanish professional road cycling. It was first run in 1981 and has stopped only due to the COVID-19 pandemic. The race was created by a cycling journalist of Diario Vasco and founder/chief of Organizaciones Deportivas Diario Vasco, Jaime Ugarte. He later went on to found Tour of the Basque Country.

Ugarte won the elections to lead the Guipuzcoan Cycling Federation, and one of his first tasks as president was revitalize the track, and the creation of an important race for San Sebastián. Along with his friends and colleagues, José Mari Eceiza and the Ayestarán brothers, they devised the idea of a professional race to inspire amateurs and fans. They designed a race between San Sebastián and Bilbao, but several reasons impeded this, so they decided to focus on Gipuzkoa, where the mountain pass Jaizkibel was located. Helped by UCI president Luis Puig, they placed the race in the highest steps of world cycling.

Ugarte has talked about the creation of the race:

Our idea was to do a race for professionals to motivate amateurs. We thought of a Six Days, but we left it at the Six Hours because here there was no mentality for this type of race. We wanted to do an international classic copying Paris–Roubaix, Milan–San Remo, Liège–Bastogne–Liège.... We also thought of doing San Sebastián-Bilbao and the following year Bilbao–San Sebastián, even round trip, but we were going too far in kilometers. In the end, we decided that since the only important pass in Gipuzkoa was Jaizkibel, it had to go through there, with a return trip through Gipuzkoa and a finish at the Boulevard. At the beginning, we also held a night criterium at the Boulevard.

=== The birth of the race ===
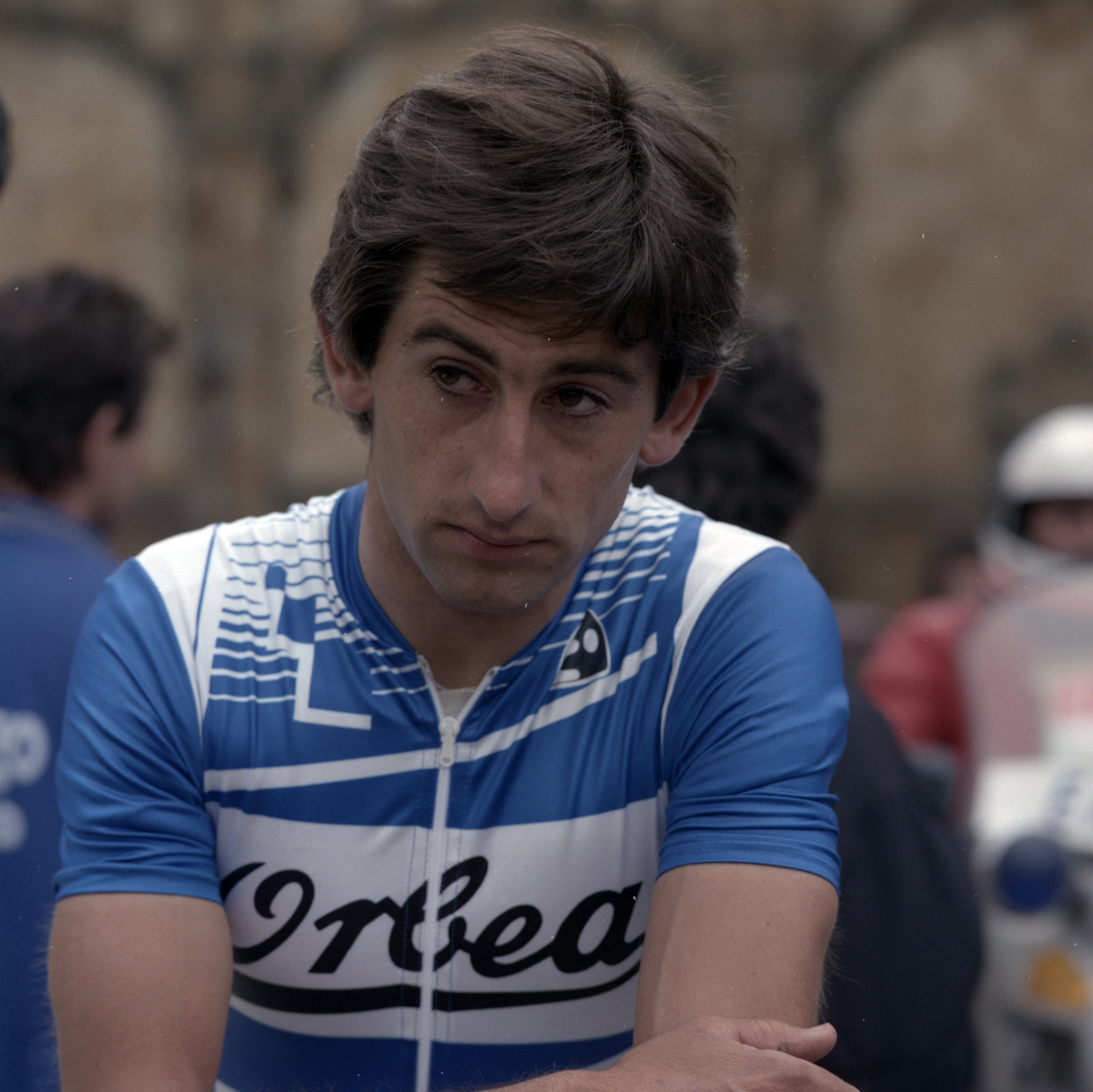
Marino Lejarreta, the race's first, and most successful champion.

The race was first organized in 1981. Throughout the 229 kilometers that this race consisted of, the most outstanding note was the hardness of it. Of the 71 riders who took the start, only 30 were able to reach the finish line, on a very hot day and with a huge number of spectators watching the race. The ascent of the five passes that marked the route caused havoc in the peloton. With some skirmishes, the race was relatively calm until the Jaizkibel (which with Azcárate, Karabieta, Udana and Alto de Orio) formed the quintet of great difficulties of the race. There, Marino Lejarreta took off and marched alone towards the finish line. He managed to win again the following year, attacking the rest of the chasing group in Jaizkibel, and reaching Pedro Delgado and Jesús Rodríguez Magro in the breakaway, managing to beat them in the final sprint. He would go on to repeat the feat in 1987. Other important riders who managed to win the race in its first editions include Miguel Induráin, World Champion Claude Criquielion and Classics Allah Adri van der Poel.

=== Redrawing the climbs ===
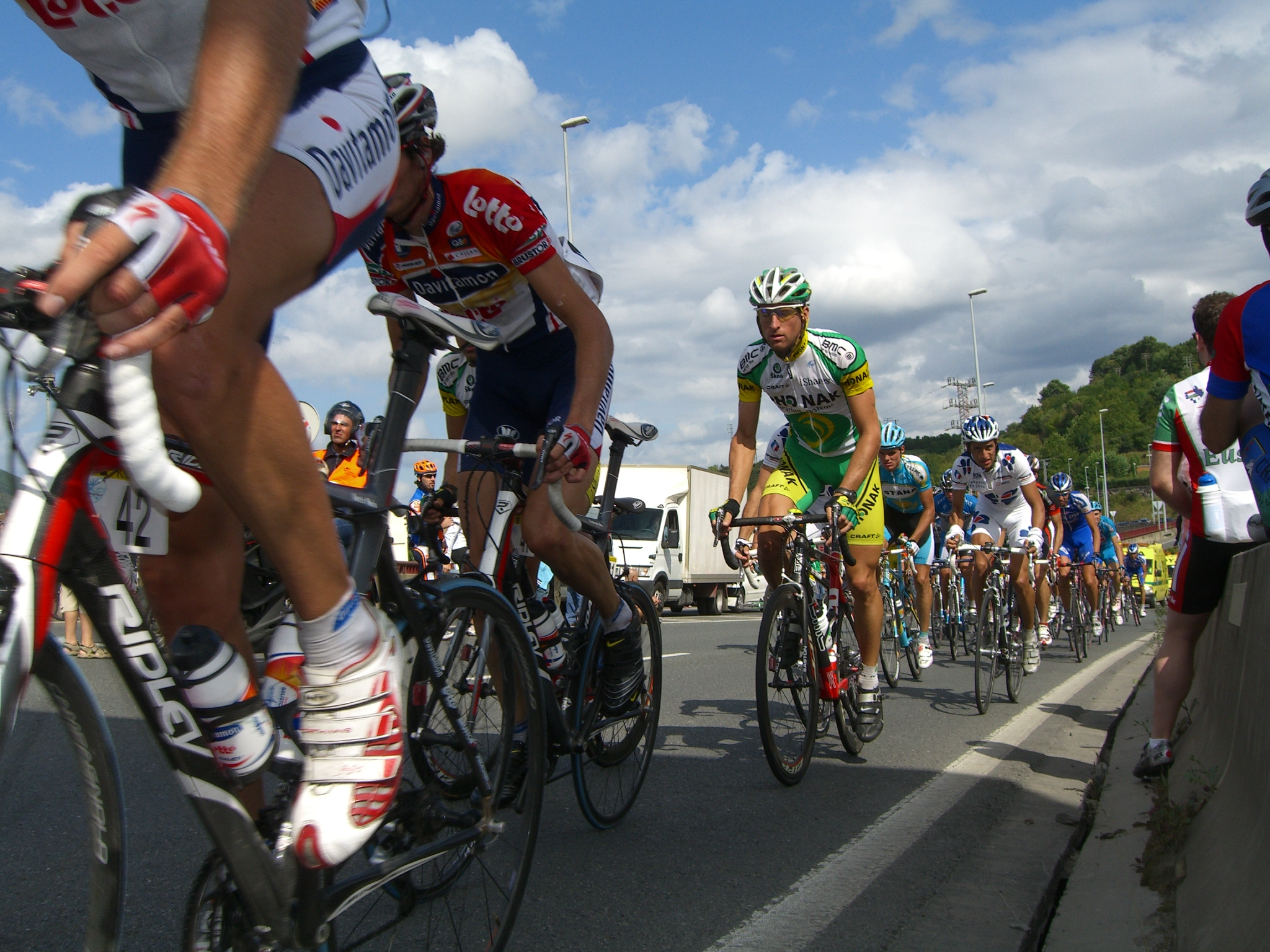
The cyclists climb in 2006.

Over the years the organizers have added climbs to complicate the race, as the riders' level has generally improved over the years, making it more of a climbers classic. The course was insufficient for the big group to break up and play for the victory in San Sebastián or in the previous climbs of Gaintzurizketa and especially Miracruz (3 km from the finish), since in some editions it had an outcome similar to that of the Milan–San Remo. After the turn of the century the race has come to be dominated by Puncheurs, All-rounders, and classics specialist who could sustain themselves in climbs, on top of the climbers.

=== Recent occurrences ===
In 2015, Adam Yates took his biggest victory to date by winning the Clásica de San Sebastián after attacking on the final climb as leader Greg Van Avermaet of BMC Racing Team was involved in a crash with a race motorcycle, and holding off the chasers on the descent into San Sebastián. In the confusion after Van Avermaet's crash Yates did not realise he had won, so did not initially celebrate when crossing the finishing line.

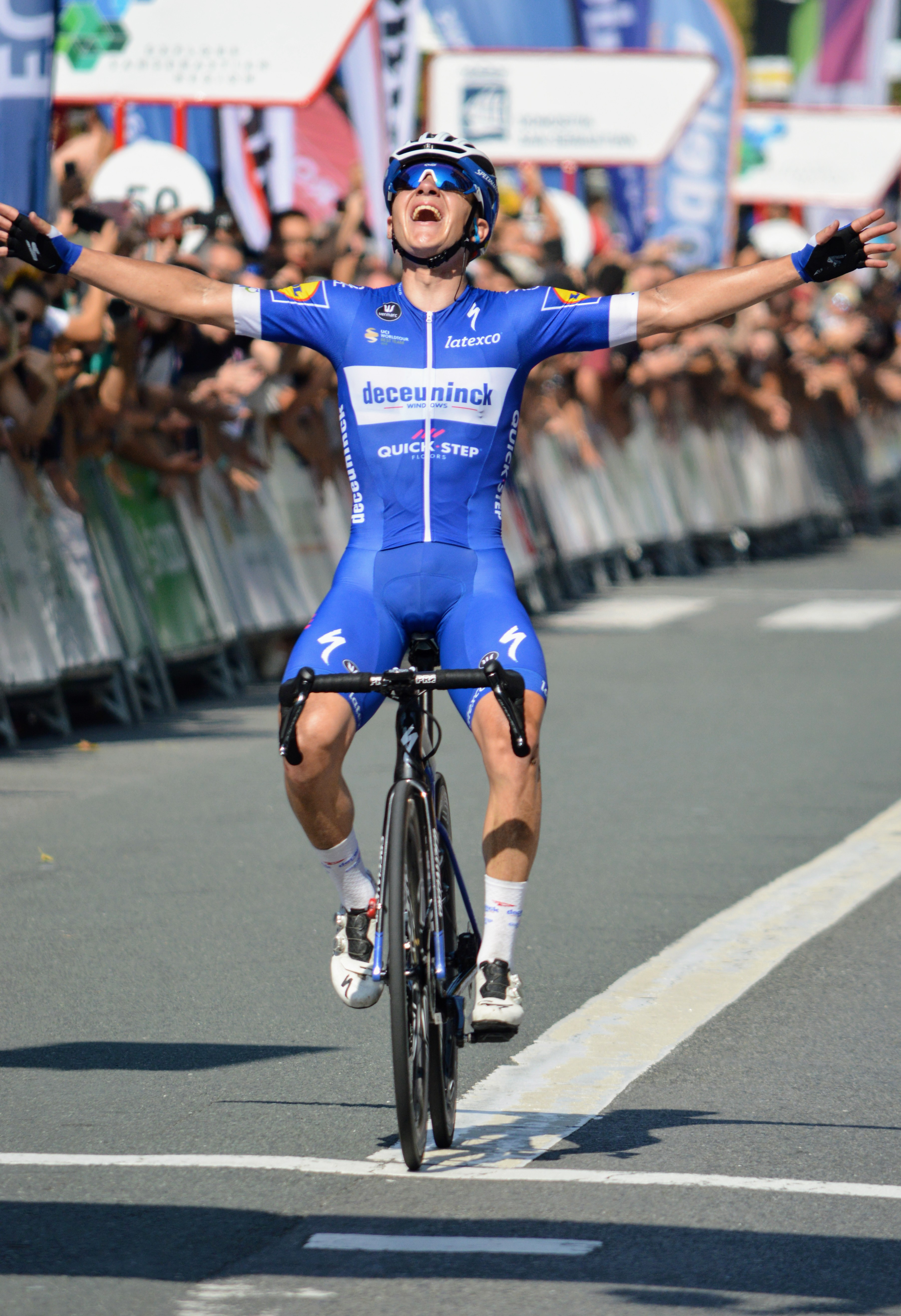
Evenepoel winning the 2019 edition.

On 3 August 2019 Remco Evenepoel scored his first World Tour victory when he won the Clásica de San Sebastián. He escaped from the field, accompanied by Toms Skujiņš about 20 km (12 mi) from the finish, dropping his companion on the last hill and soloing to victory. He became the third youngest rider to win a classic. Evenepoel subsequently won the 2022 and 2023 editions of the race, equalling the three victories of Lejarreta, and in 2026 with his fourth win surpassing Lejaretta.

== Route ==
It has always started and finished in San Sebastián and the initial and intermediate section has been variable in all its editions so its total mileage has not been the same although it has almost always been around 230 km. Its maximum difficulty is the top of Jaizquíbel (classified as 1st category) located in the first editions about 15 km from the finish, although with progressive changes it has been moving away from the finish. Thus in those first editions it was climbed on the Fuenterrabía slope until, in order to offer other alternatives, giving the opportunity to other types of riders and not favoring so much the climbers, it was decided to climb the opposite slope of Pasajes to place the pass at about 30 km from the finish.

As in 2000, a group of 53 riders arrived after Jaizkibel in 2001, the Gurutze pass (classified as 3rd category) was included, replacing the Gaintzurizketa pass, leaving Jaizkibel 32 km from the finish. This change initially caused a more selected group to arrive. However, after the 2006 edition, in which a group of 51 riders arrived, other alternatives were sought and progressively introduced. In 2008 Gurutze was replaced by Gaintzurizketa+Arkale (catalogued as 2nd category) placing Jaizkibel at 38.5 km from the finish. Then, in 2010, a circuit was added repeating twice the hard part of the race (Jaizkibel and Gaintzurizketa+Arkale). Finally, in 2014, another circuit was introduced inside San Sebastián passing twice through the finish line to climb the Igueldo pass -on the slope called Bordako Tontorra- (classified as 2nd category) at 7 km from the finish line, but leaving the last pass through Jaizkibel at 53.9 km from the finish line. This last change has not been without criticism since it can condition the race a lot as it could avoid distant attacks and favor climbers something that was wanted to be avoided in the first editions.

In the 2018 edition the race continues to be run in the surroundings of the province of Guipuzcoa in the Basque Country up to the city of San Sebastián, likewise, the total number of mountain passes is maintained with 8 passes, of which Jaizquíbel and Arkale are climbed twice with the purpose of causing a strong selection in the race, later the cyclists face the last pass of Murgil Tontorra with a length of 1.8 kilometers at 11.3% to then descend and finish above the city of San Sebastián.

=== Jaizkibel ===
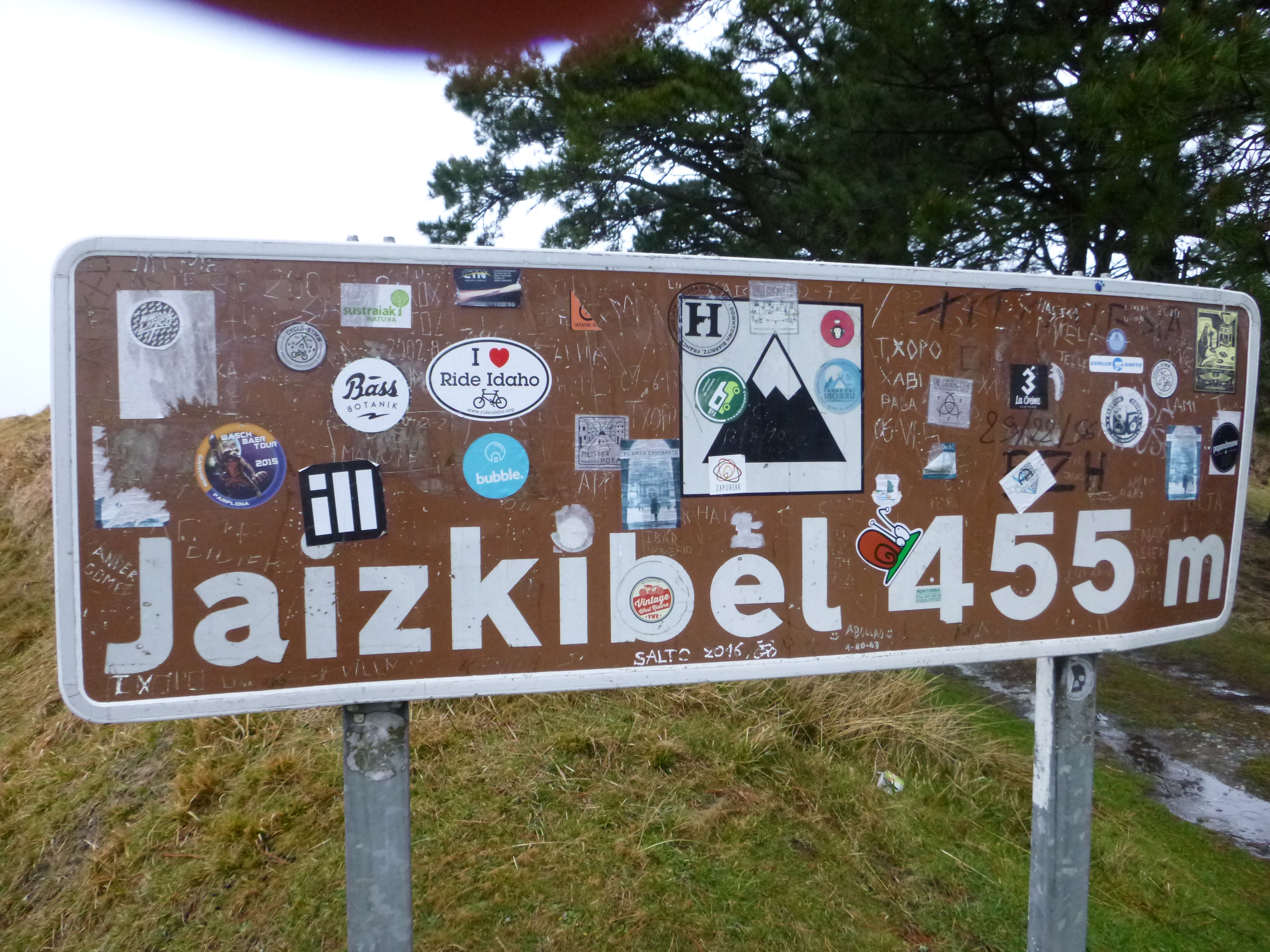
Mt. Jaizkibel

The Jaizikbel is often a decisive climb in the Clásica San Sebastián. Nowadays the hill is climbed twice in the race and during the last passage a small group of riders remains at the front of the race and are able to win the Clásica San Sebastián. The Jaizkibel is followed by the Alto de Arkale climb with the top only fourteen kilometers from the finish in San Sebastián.

=== Current climbs ===
Current climbs of the race
Name	Distance	Avg. Gradient
Azkarate	4.2 km	7.3%
Urraki	8.6 km	6.9%
Alkiza	4.4 km	6.2%
Jaizkibel	7.9 km	5.6%
Erlaitz	3.8 km	10.6%
Murgil-Tontorra	2.1 km	10.1%

== Winners ==
Year	Country	Rider	Team
1981	Spain	Marino Lejarreta	Teka
1982	Spain	Marino Lejarreta	Teka
1983	Belgium	Claude Criquielion	Splendor
1984	Switzerland	Niki Rüttimann	La Vie Claire
1985	Netherlands	Adri van der Poel	Kwantum–Decosol–Yoko
1986	Spain	Iñaki Gastón	Kas
1987	Spain	Marino Lejarreta	Caja Rural–Seguros RGA
1988	Netherlands	Gert-Jan Theunisse	PDM–Ultima–Concorde
1989	Austria	Gerhard Zadrobilek	7-Eleven
1990	Spain	Miguel Induráin	Banesto
1991	Italy	Gianni Bugno	Chateau d'Ax–Gatorade
1992	Mexico	Raúl Alcalá	PDM–Ultima–Concorde
1993	Italy	Claudio Chiappucci	Carrera Jeans–Tassoni
1994	France	Armand de Las Cuevas	Castorama
1995	United States	Lance Armstrong	Motorola
1996	Germany	Udo Bölts	Team Telekom
1997	Italy	Davide Rebellin	Française des Jeux
1998	Italy	Francesco Casagrande	Cofidis
1999	Italy	Francesco Casagrande	Vini Caldirola
2000	Netherlands	Erik Dekker	Rabobank
2001	France	Laurent Jalabert	CSC–Tiscali
2002	France	Laurent Jalabert	CSC–Tiscali
2003	Italy	Paolo Bettini	Quick-Step–Davitamon
2004	Spain	Miguel Ángel Martín Perdiguero	Saunier Duval–Prodir
2005	Spain	Constantino Zaballa	Saunier Duval–Prodir
2006	Spain	Xavier Florencio	Bouygues Télécom
2007	Spain	Juan Manuel Gárate	Quick-Step–Innergetic
2008	Spain	Alejandro Valverde	Caisse d'Epargne
2009	Czech Republic	Roman Kreuziger	Liquigas
2010	Spain	Luis León Sánchez	Caisse d'Epargne
2011	Belgium	Philippe Gilbert	Omega Pharma–Lotto
2012	Spain	Luis León Sánchez	Rabobank
2013	France	Tony Gallopin	RadioShack–Leopard
2014	Spain	Alejandro Valverde	Movistar Team
2015	Great Britain	Adam Yates	Orica–GreenEDGE
2016	Netherlands	Bauke Mollema	Trek–Segafredo
2017	Poland	Michał Kwiatkowski	Team Sky
2018	France	Julian Alaphilippe	Quick-Step Floors
2019	Belgium	Remco Evenepoel	Deceuninck–Quick-Step
2020	No race		
2021	United States	Neilson Powless	EF Education–Nippo
2022	Belgium	Remco Evenepoel	Quick-Step Alpha Vinyl Team
2023	Belgium	Remco Evenepoel	Soudal–Quick-Step
2024	Switzerland	Marc Hirschi	UAE Team Emirates
2025	Italy	Giulio Ciccone	Lidl–Trek
2026	Belgium	Remco Evenepoel	Red Bull–Bora–Hansgrohe

=== Multiple winners ===
Riders in italics are active.

Wins	Rider	Editions
4	Remco Evenepoel (BEL)	2019, 2022, 2023, 2026
3	Marino Lejarreta (ESP)	1981, 1982, 1987
2	Francesco Casagrande (ITA)	1998, 1999
2	Laurent Jalabert (FRA)	2001, 2002
2	Luis León Sánchez (ESP)	2010, 2012
2	Alejandro Valverde (ESP)	2008, 2014

=== Wins per country ===
Wins	Country
13	Spain
7	Italy
6	Belgium
5	France
4	Netherlands
2	United States
2	Switzerland
1	Austria; Czech Republic; Germany; Great Britain; Mexico; Poland

== Women's race ==
In 2019, a women's race was added. It covered 127 km and follows a similar route to the men, including a climb of the Jaizkibel. It was replaced by a 3 day event known as Itzulia Women ('Tour of the Basque Country' for women) from 2022.

Year	Country	Rider	Team
2019	Australia	Lucy Kennedy	Mitchelton–Scott
2020	No race		
2021	Netherlands	Annemiek van Vleuten	Movistar Team

=== Wins per country ===
Wins	Country
1	Australia; Netherlands
