= 1981 Clásica de San Sebastián =

Race details
- Dates: 11 August 1981
- Stages: 1
- Distance: 230 km (142.9 mi)
- Winning time: 6h 09' 24"

Results
	Winner	Marino Lejarreta (ESP)
	Second	Graham Jones (GBR)
	Third	Faustino Rupérez (ESP)

The 1981 Clásica de San Sebastián was the inaugural edition of the Clásica de San Sebastián cycle race and was held on 11 August 1981. The race started and finished in San Sebastián. The race was won by Marino Lejarreta.

== General classification ==
Final general classification

Rank	Rider	Time
1	Marino Lejarreta (ESP)	6h 09' 24"
2	Graham Jones (GBR)	+ 2' 16"
3	Faustino Rupérez (ESP)	+ 2' 16"
4	Ismael Lejarreta (ESP)	+ 2' 16"
5	Bernardo Alfonsel (ESP)	+ 2' 16"
6	Alberto Fernández (ESP)	+ 2' 16"
7	Juan Fernández Martín (ESP)	+ 3' 50"
8	Felipe Yáñez (ESP)	+ 3' 50"
9	Guillermo de la Peña (ESP)	+ 4' 23"
10	Jesús Suárez Cueva (ESP)	+ 5' 04"
