= 2019 Donostia San Sebastian Klasikoa =

Race details
- Dates: 3 August 2019
- Stages: 1
- Distance: 127.1 km (79.0 mi)
- Winning time: 3h 38' 04"

Results
	Winner	Lucy Kennedy (AUS)	(Mitchelton–Scott)
	Second	Janneke Ensing (NED)	(WNT–Rotor Pro Cycling)
	Third	Pauliena Rooijakkers (NED)	(CCC - Liv)

The 2019 Donostia San Sebastian Klasikoa was a road cycling one-day race that took place on 3 August in San Sebastián, Spain. It was the first women's edition of the Clásica de San Sebastián.

The 126.7km route covered four categorised climbs, including the Jaizkibel around the 40km mark, a tough steep climb which has often played a pivotal role in deciding the men's race.

== Teams ==
Sixteen teams participated in the race:

Professional women's teams

- Mitchelton–Scott
- CCC - Liv
- WNT–Rotor Pro Cycling
- Movistar Team
- Alé–Cipollini
- Valcar–Cylance
- Cogeas–Mettler–Look
- BTC City Ljubljana
- Doltcini–Van Eyck Sport
- Bepink
- Servetto–Piumate–Beltrami TSA
- Bizkaia–Durango
- Eneicat
- Charente-Maritime Women Cycling
- Massi–Tactic
- Sopela Women's Team

== Results ==
Result
Rank	Rider	Team	Time
1	Lucy Kennedy (AUS)	Mitchelton–Scott	3h 38' 04"
2	Janneke Ensing (NED)	WNT–Rotor Pro Cycling	+ 23"
3	Pauliena Rooijakkers (NED)	CCC - Liv	+ 1' 04"
4	Anastasia Chursina (RUS)	BTC City Ljubljana	s.t.
5	Edwige Pitel (FRA)	Cogeas–Mettler–Look	+ 1' 06"
6	Lourdes Oyarbide Jimenez (SPA)	Movistar Team	+ 1' 12"
7	Ah Reum Na (KOR)	Alé–Cipollini	+ 1' 38"
8	Kathrin Hammes (GER)	WNT–Rotor Pro Cycling	s.t.
9	Hanna Nilsson (SWE)	BTC City Ljubljana	s.t.
10	Alessia Vigilia (ITA)	Valcar–Cylance	+ 2' 04"

== See also ==
- 2019 in women's road cycling
