= Iñaki Lejarreta =

Spanish cyclist (1983–2012)

Iñaki Lejarreta Errasti
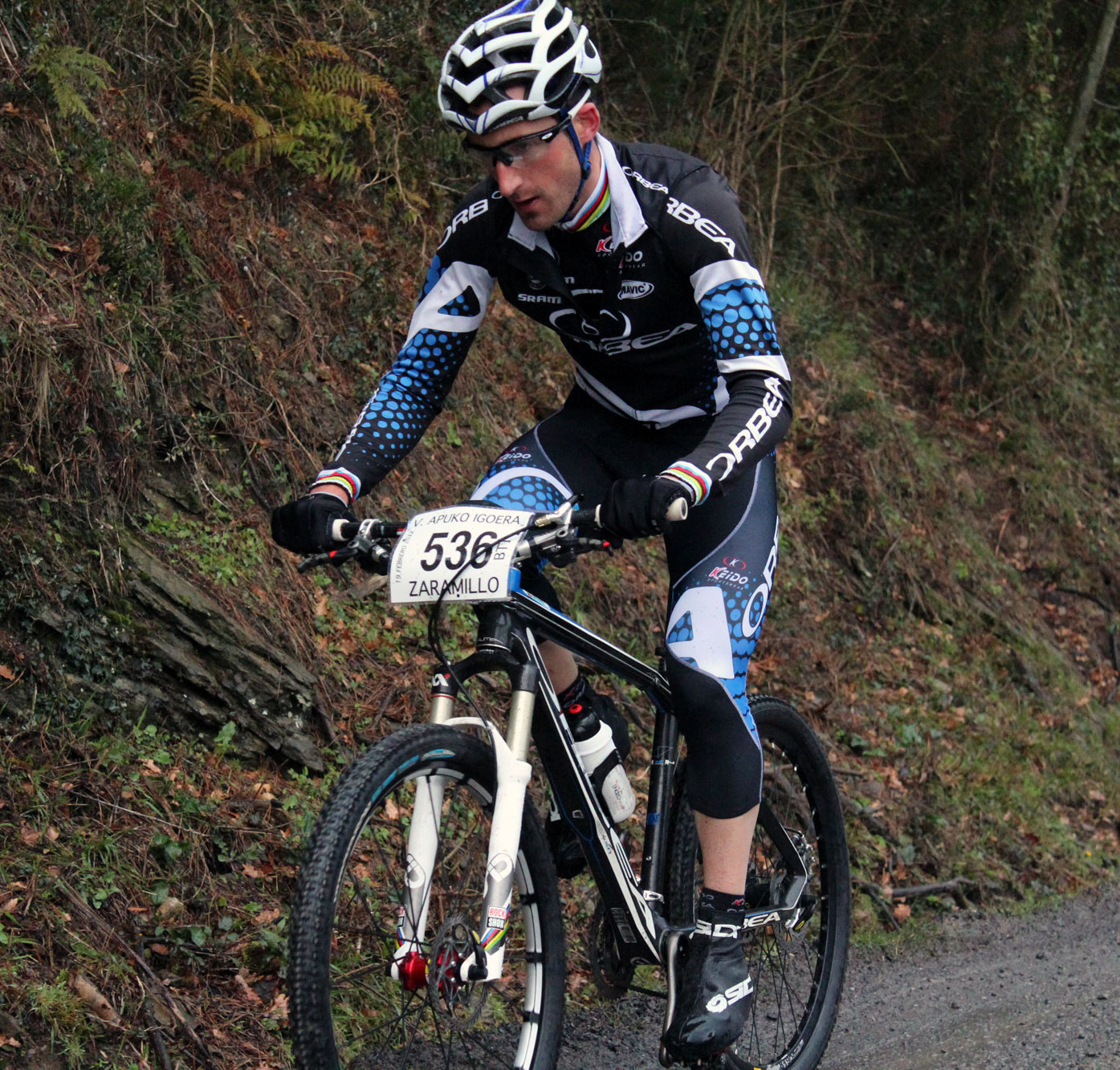

Personal information
- Full name: Iñaki Lejarreta Errasti
- Nickname: leja
- Born: 1 September 1983 Berriz, Spain
- Died: 16 December 2012 (aged 29) Iurreta, Spain
- Height: 178 cm (5 ft 10 in)
- Weight: 64–68 kg (141–150 lb)

Cycling career
- Sport: Cycling
- Discipline: Mountain bike racing
- Rider type: Cross-country

Professional team
- Orbea

Iñaki Lejarreta Errasti (1 September 1983 – 16 December 2012) was a Spanish mountain biker. He was a junior world champion in 2001, and national mountain bike champion in 2007. He competed in the cross-country cycling at the 2008 Beijing Olympics, and was professionally part of the Orbea cycling team. In 2012, Lejarreta was killed in a crash while training when his bike was struck by a car. He was 29.

His father Ismael and his uncle Marino (winner of the 1982 Vuelta a España) were also professional cyclists.

== Track Record (only top 20) ==
2012

- 20th World Championship – Saalfelden, Austria
- 3rd Spanish Championship – Lorca, Murcia
- 1st C.C.International – Val de Lord, Lleida
- 2nd C.C.Internacional – Banyoles, Lleida
- 4th French Cup – St.Raphael, France
- 4th Portugal Cup – Diverlanhoso, Portugal
- 5th French Cup – Meribel, France
- 6th French Cup – Super Besse, France
- 6th Belgacom – Stoumont, Belgium
- 14th Bundesliga – Albstadt, Germany
- 17th World Cup – Pietermaritzburg, South Africa
- 1st road race - Lazkao, Gipuzkoa

2011

- 7th World Cup – Pietermaritzburg, South Africa
- 14th World Championship – Champery, Switzerland
- 2nd Spanish Championship – Becerril de la Sierra, Madrid
- 12th World Cup – Offenburg, Germany
- 1st C.C.International – Val de Lord, Lleida
- 1st Portugal Cup – Seia, Portugal
- 1st Andalucia Bike Race 3rd stage – Cordoba, Cordoba
- 2nd Andalucia Bike Race 1st stage – Cordoba, Cordoba
- 2nd Andalucia Bike Race 2nd stage – Cordoba, Cordoba
- 4th French Cup – St.Raphael, France
- 4th Spanish Cup – Madrid, Madrid
- 1st in 10 races

2010

- 8th European Championship – Haifa, Israel
- 1st Overall Spanish Cup (MTB)
- 1st Spanish Cup – Huelva, Huelva
- 1st Spanish Cup – Aviles, Asturias
- 1st Spanish Cup – Cueva del Soplao, Cantabria
- 10th World Cup – Offenburg, Germany
- 31st World Championship – Mont Sainte Anne, Canada
- 2nd Bundesliga – Münsingen, Germany
- 2nd Spanish Cup– Banyoles, Girona
- 2nd Spanish Cup – Val de Lord, Lleida
- 2nd Spanish Cup – Port Aine, Lleida
- 4th Spanish Championship – Montjuic, Barcelona
- 9th Bundesliga – Heubach, Germany
- 16th World Cup – Windham, USA
- 18th World Cup – Dalby Forest, United Kingdom

2009

- 8th World Cup – Madrid, Spain
- 1st Spanish Cup – Berriz, Bizkaia
- 20th World Championship – Canberra, Australia
- 3rd Spanish Cup – Aviles, Asturias
- 4th Spanish Championship – Montjuic, Barcelona
- 4th Switzerland Cup – Winterthur, Switzerland
- 14th World Cup – Schladming, Austria
- 17th World Cup – Offenburg, Germany
- 18th European Championship – Zoetermeer, Netherlands

2008

- 8th Olympic Games – Beijing, China
- 8th World Championship – Comezzadura, Italy
- 9th World Cup – Vallnord, Andorra
- 3rd French Cup – St.Raphael, France
- 4th Spanish Championship – Port Aine, Lleida
- 4th Spanish Cup – Aviles, Asturias
- 15th World Cup – Offenburg, Germany
- 17th World Cup – Houffalize, Belgium

2007

- 10th World Cup – Houffalize, Belgium
- 1st Spanish Cup – Ager, Lleida
- 1st second stage in Tour of Catalonia - Calaf, Lleida
- 2nd French Cup – Montgenevre, France
- 3rd Spanish Championship – Ramales, Cantabria
- 3rd French Cup – St. Flour, France
- 5th Switzerland Cup – Schaan, Switzerland
- 6th Switzerland Cup – Hasliberg, Switzerland
- 15th World Cup – Monta Sainte Anne, Canada
- 15th World Cup – Maribor, Slovenia
- 18th World Cup – Champery, Switzerland

2006

- 6th Roc d’Azur Classic – Frejus, France
- 1st Catalonia Internacional Championship - Calaf

2005

- 1st U23 Basque Country Championship (Road)
- 2nd U23 Spanish Championship - Vilaboa
- 1st U23 Basque Country Championship (Road)

2004

- 3rd World Cup (1st U23) – Livigno, Italy
- 4th U23 World Championship – Les Gets, France
- 2nd U23 European Championship – Wallbryzch, Poland
- 10th World Cup Overall (2nd U23)
- 3rd Team Relay European Championship – Wallbryzch, Poland
- 14th World Cup (1st U23) – Schladming, Austria
- 1st Spanish Cup – Candeleda

2003

- 1st Overall Spanish Cup
- 1st in 4 stages of Spanish Cup

2002

- 3rd U23 European Championship – Zurich, Switzerland
- 2nd U23 Spanish Championship – San Isidro

2001

- 1st Junior World Championship – Vail, Colorado U.S.A
- 3rd Team Relay World Championship – Vail, Colorado U.S.A
- 9th Junior Time Trial World Championship – Lisboa, Portugal (Road)
- 1st Junior Spanish Championship - Vigo
- 1st Overall Junior Spanish Cup
- 1st all stages of Junior Spanish Cup
- 1st Olympic pursuit Spanish Championship - Logroño (Track)
- 3rd Individual pursuit Spanish Championship - Logroño (Track)
- 1st in three stages of Basque Country Cup (Road)
- 1st Main stage of Vuelta Pamplona (Road)
- 1st Time Trial of Vuelta Pamplona (Road)
- 3rd Overall Vuelta Pamplona (Road)
- 1st Time Trial race in France (Road)
- 1st Time Trial Bizkaia Championship (Road)
- 1st Time Trial Junior Grand Prix des Nations – St.Romain, France (Road)

2000

- 1st Team Relay World Championship – Sierra Nevada, Spain
- 2nd Junior World Championship – Sierra Nevada, Spain
- 8th Junior European Championship – Rennen, Netherlands
- 2nd Junior Spanish Championship - Candanchú
- 1st Junior Spanish Cup - Girona
- 1st in two stages of Basque Country Cup (Road)
- 3rd Overall Vuelta La Rioja (Road)

1999

- 1st Spanish Championship – Sierra Nevada, Spain
- 1st in four stages of Basque Country Cup (Road)
