= 1985 Clásica de San Sebastián =

Race details
- Dates: 16 August 1985
- Stages: 1
- Distance: 244 km (151.6 mi)
- Winning time: 5h 52' 32"

Results
	Winner	Adri van der Poel (NED)	(Kwantum–Decosol–Yoko)
	Second	Iñaki Gastón (ESP)	(Reynolds)
	Third	Juan Fernández Martín (ESP)	(Zor–Gemeaz Cusin)

The 1985 Clásica de San Sebastián was the 5th edition of the Clásica de San Sebastián cycle race and was held on 16 August 1985. The race started and finished in San Sebastián. The race was won by Adri van der Poel of the Kwantum team.

== General classification ==
Final general classification

Rank	Rider	Team	Time
1	Adri van der Poel (NED)	Kwantum–Decosol–Yoko	5h 52' 32"
2	Iñaki Gastón (ESP)	Reynolds	+ 0"
3	Juan Fernández Martín (ESP)	Zor–Gemeaz Cusin	+ 0"
4	Miguel Ángel Iglesias (ESP)	Kelme–Merckx	+ 0"
5	Niki Rüttimann (SUI)	La Vie Claire	+ 0"
6	Antonio Esparza (ESP)	Kelme–Merckx	+ 0"
7	Imanol Murga (ESP)	Orbea–Gin MG	+ 0"
8	Ángel Camarillo (ESP)	Zor–Gemeaz Cusin	+ 0"
9	Álvaro Pino (ESP)	Zor–Gemeaz Cusin	+ 0"
10	Felipe Yáñez (ESP)	Orbea–Gin MG	+ 0"
