= Jesús Rodríguez Magro =

Spanish cyclist (1960–2018)

Personal information
- Born: 28 May 1960 Madrid, Spain
- Died: 19 September 2018 (aged 58) Alcalá de Henares, Spain

Cycling career
- Sport: Cycling
- Discipline: Road
- Role: Rider

Professional teams
- 1982–1986: Zor–Helios–Gemeaz Cusin
- 1987: Teka
- 1988–1993: Reynolds

Jesús Rodríguez Magro (28 May 1960 – 19 September 2018) was a Spanish racing cyclist. He rode in nineteen Grand Tours between 1982 and 1992.

== Major results ==
1979
2nd Overall Vuelta a Navarra
1980
9th Gran Premio della Liberazione
1982
2nd Clásica de San Sebastián
1983
3rd Subida al Naranco
10th Clásica de San Sebastián
1984
2nd Klasika Primavera
1985
1st Stage 2 Vuelta a Asturias
1st Stage 4 Vuelta a Burgos
1st Stage 4b Vuelta a los Valles Mineros
2nd Overall Vuelta a Cantabria
1986
1st Overall Vuelta a Asturias
1988
2nd Clásica a los Puertos
1989
5th Clásica de San Sebastián
1990
8th Clásica de San Sebastián
9th Overall Tour of Galicia
1993
7th Subida a Urkiola

=== Grand Tour general classification results timeline ===
Grand Tour	1982	1983	1984	1985	1986	1987	1988	1989	1990	1991	1992
Giro d'Italia	50	—	DNF	—	—	—	45	—	—	—	—
Tour de France	—	—	—	30	40	78	52	33	41	100	—
Vuelta a España	—	21	11	26	33	76	—	53	29	40	73
