= 1987 Clásica de San Sebastián =

Race details
- Dates: 12 August 1987
- Stages: 1
- Distance: 244 km (151.6 mi)
- Winning time: 6h 19' 19"

Results
	Winner	Marino Lejarreta (ESP)	(Caja Rural–Orbea)
	Second	Ángel Arroyo (ESP)	(Reynolds)
	Third	Federico Echave (ESP)	(BH)

The 1987 Clásica de San Sebastián was the 7th edition of the Clásica de San Sebastián cycle race and was held on 12 August 1987. The race started and finished in San Sebastián. The race was won by Marino Lejarreta of the Caja Rural team.

== General classification ==
Final general classification

Rank	Rider	Team	Time
1	Marino Lejarreta (ESP)	Caja Rural–Orbea	6h 19' 19"
2	Ángel Arroyo (ESP)	Reynolds	+ 28"
3	Federico Echave (ESP)	BH	+ 28"
4	Erik Breukink (NED)	Panasonic–Isostar	+ 1' 02"
5	José Recio (ESP)	Kelme	+ 1' 02"
6	Jesús Blanco Villar (ESP)	Teka	+ 1' 02"
7	Ángel Camarillo (ESP)	Teka	+ 1' 02"
8	Teun van Vliet (NED)	Panasonic–Isostar	+ 1' 12"
9	Adri van der Poel (NED)	PDM–Ultima–Concorde	+ 1' 12"
10	Pello Ruiz Cabestany (ESP)	Caja Rural–Orbea	+ 1' 12"
