= 1982 Clásica de San Sebastián =

Race details
- Dates: 12 August 1982
- Stages: 1
- Distance: 229 km (142.3 mi)
- Winning time: 5h 54' 48"

Results
	Winner	Marino Lejarreta (ESP)
	Second	Jesús Rodríguez Magro (ESP)
	Third	Pedro Delgado (ESP)

The 1982 Clásica de San Sebastián was the second edition of the Clásica de San Sebastián cycle race and was held on 12 August 1982. The race started and finished in San Sebastián. The race was won by Marino Lejarreta.

== General classification ==
Final general classification

Rank	Rider	Time
1	Marino Lejarreta (ESP)	5h 54' 48"
2	Jesús Rodríguez Magro (ESP)	+ 0"
3	Pedro Delgado (ESP)	+ 0"
4	Bernardo Alfonsel (ESP)	+ 0"
5	Ronny Van Holen (BEL)	+ 9"
6	Antonio Coll (ESP)	+ 9"
7	Bernard Vallet (FRA)	+ 9"
8	Federico Echave (ESP)	+ 9"
9	Faustino Rupérez (ESP)	+ 9"
10	Ángel Arroyo (ESP)	+ 9"
