= 1989 Volta a Catalunya =

Race details
- Dates: 2–8 September 1989
- Stages: 7
- Distance: 1,130.3 km (702.3 mi)
- Winning time: 28h 34' 05"

Results
	Winner	Marino Lejarreta (ESP)	(Paternina)
	Second	Pedro Delgado (ESP)	(Reynolds)
	Third	Álvaro Pino (ESP)	(BH)
	Points	Manuel Jorge Domínguez (ESP)	(BH)
	Mountains	Thierry Claveyrolat (FRA)	(RMO)
	Sprints	Miguel Ángel Iglesias (ESP)	(Helios–Colchón CR)
	Team	BH	

The 1989 Volta a Catalunya was the 69th edition of the Volta a Catalunya cycle race and was held from 2 September to 8 September 1989. The race started in L'Hospitalet and finished in Platja d'Aro. The race was won by Marino Lejarreta of the Paternina team.

== General classification ==
Final general classification

Rank	Rider	Team	Time
1	Marino Lejarreta (ESP)	Paternina	28h 34' 05"
2	Pedro Delgado (ESP)	Reynolds	+ 9"
3	Álvaro Pino (ESP)	BH	+ 23"
4	Laudelino Cubino (ESP)	BH	+ 39"
5	Tony Rominger (SUI)	Chateau d'Ax	+ 1' 06"
6	Thierry Claveyrolat (FRA)	RMO	+ 1' 27"
7	Jokin Mújika (ESP)	Paternina	+ 1' 30"
8	Alberto Camargo (COL)	Café de Colombia	+ 1' 39"
9	Raúl Alcalá (MEX)	PDM–Ultima–Concorde	+ 1' 40"
10	Miguel Induráin (ESP)	Reynolds	+ 1' 52"
