= 1986 Vuelta a España =

Race details
- Dates: 22 April – 13 May
- Stages: 21 + Prologue
- Distance: 3,666 km (2,278 mi)
- Winning time: 98h 16' 04"

Results
Jersey awarded to the overall winner	Winner	Álvaro Pino (ESP)	(Zor–BH)
	Second	Robert Millar (GBR)	(Panasonic–Merckx–Agu)
	Third	Sean Kelly (IRL)	(Kas)
Jersey awarded to the points classification winner	Points	Sean Kelly (IRL)	(Kas)
Jersey awarded to the mountains classification winner	Mountains	José Luis Laguía (ESP)	(Reynolds)
Jersey awarded to the youth classification winner	Youth	Omar Hernández (COL)	(Ryalcao Postobón)
Jersey awarded to the combination classification winner	Combination	Sean Kelly (IRL)	(Kas)
Jersey awarded to the sprints classification winner	Sprints	Benny Van Brabant (BEL)	(Dormilón)
	Team	Zor–BH	

The 41st Edition Vuelta a España (Tour of Spain), a long-distance bicycle stage race and one of the three grand tours, was held from 22 April to 13 May 1986. It consisted of 21 stages covering a total of 3,666 km (2,278 mi), and was won by Álvaro Pino of the Zor–BH cycling team.

== Route ==
List of stages
Stage	Date	Course	Distance	Type	Winner
P	22 April	Palma de Mallorca to Palma de Mallorca	5.7 km (4 mi)	Individual time trial	Thierry Marie (FRA)
1	23 April	Palma de Mallorca to Palma de Mallorca	190 km (118 mi)		Marc Gomez (FRA)
2	24 April	Barcelona to Barcelona	182 km (113 mi)		Manuel Jorge Domínguez (ESP)
3	25 April	Lleida to Zaragoza	212 km (132 mi)		Eddy Planckaert (BEL)
4	26 April	Zaragoza to Logroño	192 km (119 mi)		Alfonso Gutiérrez (ESP)
5	27 April	Haro to Santander	202 km (126 mi)		Jesús Blanco Villar (ESP)
6	28 April	Santander to Lakes of Covadonga	191 km (119 mi)		Robert Millar (GBR)
7	29 April	Cangas de Onís to Oviedo	180 km (112 mi)		Eddy Planckaert (BEL)
8	30 April	Oviedo to Alto del Naranco	9.7 km (6 mi)	Individual time trial	Marino Lejarreta (ESP)
9	1 May	Oviedo to San Isidro	180 km (112 mi)		Charly Mottet (FRA)
10	2 May	San Isidro to Palencia	193 km (120 mi)		Sean Kelly (IRL)
11	3 May	Valladolid to Valladolid	29.1 km (18 mi)	Individual time trial	Charly Mottet (FRA)
12	4 May	Valladolid to Segovia	258 km (160 mi)		Reimund Dietzen (FRG)
13	5 May	Segovia to Villalba	148 km (92 mi)		Sean Kelly (IRL)
14	6 May	Casino Gran Madrid (Torrelodones) to Leganés	165 km (103 mi)		José Recio (ESP)
15	7 May	Aranjuez to Albacete	207 km (129 mi)		Jon Egiarte (ESP)
16	8 May	Albacete to Jaén	264 km (164 mi)		Alain Bondue (FRA)
17	9 May	Jaén to Sierra Nevada	172 km (107 mi)		Felipe Yáñez (ESP)
18	10 May	Granada to Benalmádena	191 km (119 mi)		Viktor Demidenko (URS)
19	11 May	Benalmádena to Puerto Real	234 km (145 mi)		Jesús Blanco Villar (ESP)
20	12 May	Puerto Real to Jerez de la Frontera	239 km (149 mi)		Marc Gomez (FRA)
21	13 May	Jerez de la Frontera to Jerez de la Frontera	22 km (14 mi)	Individual time trial	Álvaro Pino (ESP)
	Total		3,666 km (2,278 mi)		

== General classification (final) ==
Rank	Rider	Team	Time
1	(Spain) Álvaro Pino	Zor	98h16'04"
2	(United Kingdom) Robert Millar	Panasonic	1'06"
3	(Republic of Ireland) Sean Kelly	Kas	5'19"
4	(Germany) Raimund Dietzen	Teka	5'58"
5	(Spain) Marino Lejarreta	Seat–Orbea	7'12"
6	(Spain) Pello Ruiz Cabestany	Seat–Orbea	7'26"
7	(France) Laurent Fignon	Système U–Gitane	7'29"
8	(Colombia) Fabio Parra	Café de Colombia	7'44"
9	(Spain) Anselmo Fuerte	Zor	10'50"
10	(Spain) Pedro Delgado	PDM–Concorde	11'50"
11	(Belgium) Lucien Van Impe	Dormilon–Campagnolo	
12	(Spain) Ignacio Gaston Crespo	Kas–Mavic	
13	(Colombia) Omar Hernández	Postobón–RCN	
14	(France) Yvon Madiot	Système U–Gitane	
15	(Netherlands) Peter Winnen	Panasonic	
16	(Spain) Jesús Blanco Villar	Teka	
17	(Colombia) Carlos Gutiérrez	Kelme	
18	(France) Éric Guyot	Kas–Mavic	
19	(Switzerland) Stefan Mutter	PDM–Gin MG–Concorde	
20	(Spain) Enrique Aja Cagigas	Teka	
21	(Belgium) Lucien Van Impe	Dormilon–Campagnolo	
22	(France) Charly Mottet	Système U–Gitane	
23	(Colombia) Nestor Mora	Postobón-RCN	
24	(Spain) Eduardo Chozas	Teka	
25	(Spain) José Luis Laguía	Reynolds	
