= Ismael Lejarreta =

Spanish cyclist

Personal information
- Full name: Ismael Lejarreta Arrizabalaga
- Born: 11 June 1953 (age 73) Berriz, Spain

Cycling career
- Sport: Cycling
- Role: Rider

Ismael Lejarreta Arrizabalaga (born 11 June 1953) is a Spanish former racing cyclist. He rode in eight Grand Tours between 1977 and 1983.

His brother Marino (winner of the 1982 Vuelta a España) and his son Iñaki (killed in a road accident aged 29) were also professional cyclists.
