= Manuel Domínguez (cyclist) =

Spanish cyclist (born 1962)

Personal information
- Full name: Manuel Jorge Domínguez Diaz
- Born: 8 December 1962 (age 63) Barredos, Spain

Cycling career
- Sport: Cycling
- Current team: Retired
- Discipline: Road
- Role: Rider
- Rider type: Sprinter

Professional teams
- 1985–1986: Seat–Orbea
- 1987–1989: BH
- 1990: IOC–Tulip Computers
- 1991–1992: CLAS–Cajastur

Major wins
- Grand Tours Tour de France 1 individual stage (1987) Vuelta a España 1 individual stage (1986)

Manuel Jorge Domínguez Diaz (born 8 December 1962) is a Spanish former professional road bicycle racer. He competed in the individual road race event at the 1984 Summer Olympics.

== Major results ==
1982
1st Stage 1 Vuelta Asturias
1983
1st Road race, National Junior Road Championships
1st Overall Bizkaiko Bira
1984
1st Gran Premio della Liberazione
1985
10th Road race, National Road Championships
1986
1st Stage 2 Vuelta a España
1st Stage 3 Vuelta a La Rioja
3rd Road race, National Road Championships
3rd Overall Vuelta a Castilla y León
1987
1st Stage 7 Tour de France
1st Stage 1 Tour of the Basque Country
2nd Overall Vuelta a Castilla y León

1st Stages 3 & 8

3rd Road race, National Road Championships
1988
1st Stage 1 Tour of the Basque Country
1st Stage 2 Vuelta Asturias
Vuelta a Castilla y León

1st Stages 2 & 4

Tour of Galicia

1st Stages 1 & 3

2nd Road race, National Road Championships
1989
1st Gran Premio de Llodio
Volta a Catalunya

1st Points classification
1st Stage 6a

1st Stage 5 Grand Prix du Midi Libre
1st Stage 5 Vuelta Asturias
1st Stage 6 Vuelta a Castilla y León
4th Trofeo Masferrer
8th Road race, National Road Championships
1991
3rd Road race, National Road Championships
4th Grand Prix Pino Cerami
