= Marino Lejarreta =

Spanish cyclist

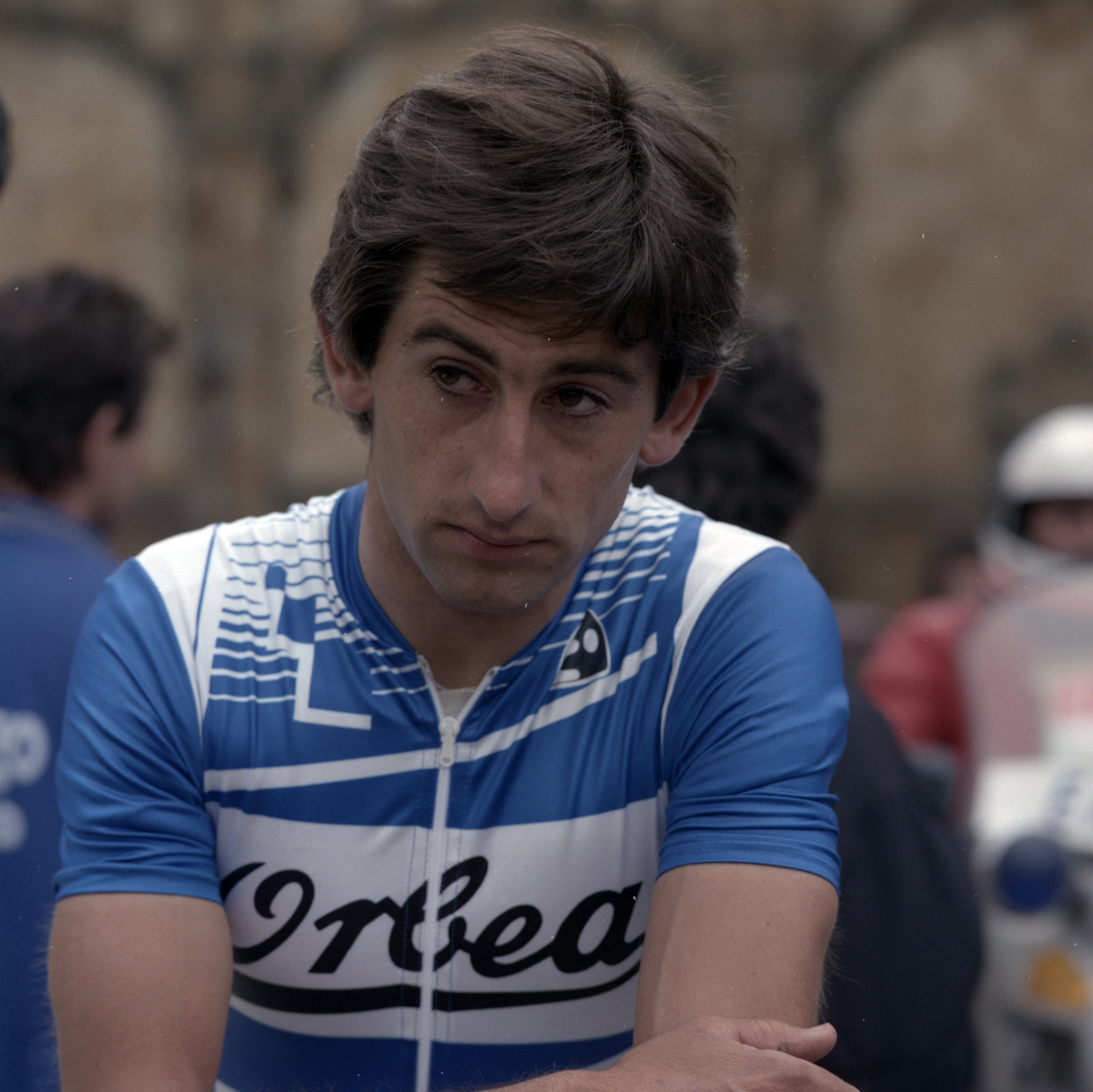
- Lejarreta in 1987

Personal information
- Full name: Marino Lejarreta Arrizabalaga
- Nickname: El Junco de Bérriz (The Reed of Berriz)
- Born: 14 May 1957 (age 69) Berriz, Spain

Cycling career
- Sport: Cycling
- Current team: Retired
- Discipline: Road
- Role: Rider

Professional teams
- 1979: Novostil–Helios
- 1980–1982: Teka
- 1983–1985: Alfa Lum–Olmo
- 1986–1989: Seat–Orbea
- 1990–1992: ONCE

Major wins
- Grand Tours Tour de France 1 individual stage (1990) Giro d'Italia 2 individual stages (1984, 1991) Vuelta a España General classification (1982) Points classification (1983) 5 individual stages (1982, 1983, 1986) Stage races Volta a Catalunya (1980, 1989) One-day races and Classics Clásica de San Sebastián (1981, 1982, 1987)

Marino Lejarreta Arrizabalaga (born 14 May 1957) is a retired Basque Spanish professional road racing cyclist. His biggest victory was capturing the 1982 Vuelta a España, a Grand Tour stage race, and he is the inaugural and three-time winner of the Clásica de San Sebastián (1981, 1982, 1987), which is now considered a one-day classic. In 1989, Lejarreta captured the Volta a Catalunya, repeating one of his first professional wins in 1980 at the same event.

== Career ==
Lejarreta rode very well in the 1982 Vuelta, but initially finished 2nd to Ángel Arroyo while coming in just eighteen seconds ahead of Michel Pollentier. Following the race, however, Arroyo and several other riders failed doping controls in one of the biggest scandals in Vuelta history, making the young Basque rider the de facto winner of the race. It was a bittersweet victory as he was not actually the victor riding into Madrid. For the 1983 Vuelta a España he would be up against Bernard Hinault, who had his teammates Laurent Fignon and Greg LeMond, as well as other strong riders including Hennie Kuiper and the Spanish riders of Pino, Alberto Fernández and a young Pedro Delgado who was riding in his second Vuelta. The leaders Jersey changed hands numerous times, and Lejarreta held it early while also winning a mountain time trial, but suffered a crash and lost it. During the Lagos de Covadonga stage, he escaped from the group of favourites made up of Fernandez, Pino, Hinault, Kuiper and others and soloed to victory, but it was not enough to reclaim the lead. In the end, he finished just 1:12 behind Hinault to stand on the podium in 2nd.

Later in his career, he would win his only Tour de France stage in a very unusual manner. During the 1990 edition, he found himself among the group of favourites as Delgado, Breukink and LeMond were battling the surprising Claudio Chiappucci for the Yellow Jersey. During stage 14, he attacked off the front of the favourites group in an effort to chase down the final few breakaway riders and go for the stage win. When he crossed the finish line ahead of the favourites, he did not throw his arms up to celebrate because he did not think he had caught the final breakaway rider. With the available technology not giving instant times, results and standings as it does today, it was not as easy to know what was going on from within the race, and Lejarreta didn't find out until he came to a stop and was told by his team that he had won the stage.

He would win stages in all three Grand Tours and finish in the top 10 fifteen times: The Giro seven times, the Tour three times and the Vuelta five times, including three podium places and a win in 1982.

Until 2015, Lejarreta was the only person in history to complete all three Grand Tours in a single year four times in a career; he did the triple in 1987, 1989, 1990 and 1991. Adam Hansen is the only rider to complete all three Grand Tours in a season more times than Lejarreta. However, unlike Lejarreta, Hansen never contended in the general classification. In fact, during the four seasons he completed all three Grand Tours, he placed in the Top 10 in eight out of twelve of them.

His brother Ismael and his nephew Iñaki (killed in a road accident aged 29) were also professional cyclists.

== Major results ==
1980
1st Overall Volta a Catalunya

1st Mountains classification

1st Overall Escalada a Montjuïc

1st Stage 1c (ITT)

1st Stage 4 Vuelta Asturias
3rd Overall Tour of the Basque Country
3rd Overall Deutschland Tour
3rd Overall Étoile des Espoirs
5th Overall Vuelta a España
5th Overall Critérium du Dauphiné Libéré
1981
1st Clásica de San Sebastián
1st Subida al Naranco
1st Circuito de Getxo
1st Prueba Villafranca de Ordizia
3rd Overall Tour of the Basque Country
3rd Overall Volta a Catalunya

1st Mountains classification

4th Overall Grand Prix du Midi Libre
8th Overall Tour du Tarn

1st Stage 3

8th Overall Deutschland Tour
10th Road race, National Road Championships
10th Tre Valli Varesine
1982
1st Overall Vuelta a España

1st Stage 17

1st Overall Vuelta a La Rioja
1st Overall Vuelta a Cantabria

1st Prologue

1st Overall Escalada a Montjuïc

1st Stage 1a

1st Clásica de San Sebastián
1st Stage 2 Vuelta a los Valles Mineros
3rd GP Navarra
5th Road race, UCI Road World Championships
1983
1st Overall Escalada a Montjuïc

1st Stages 1a & 1b (ITT)

1st Giro dell'Appennino
2nd Overall Vuelta a España

1st Points classification
1st Stages 6, 8 (ITT) & 13
Held after Stages 6–9

2nd Giro dell'Umbria
3rd Overall Tour of the Basque Country
3rd Coppa Sabatini
3rd Klasika Primavera
5th Giro dell'Emilia
6th Overall Giro d'Italia
6th Subida al Naranco
7th Giro della Provincia di Reggio Calabria
8th Tre Valli Varesine
1984
3rd Overall Tour of the Basque Country
3rd Subida al Naranco
4th Overall Giro d'Italia

1st Stage 19

1985
2nd Gran Premio Industria e Commercio di Prato
3rd Overall Tour of the Basque Country
3rd Giro dell'Emilia
3rd Coppa Sabatini
3rd Giro dell'Appennino
5th Overall Giro d'Italia
6th Giro di Campania
7th GP Industria & Artigianato di Larciano
8th Coppa Placci
8th Tour du Nord-Ouest
9th Overall Tour de Romandie
1986
1st Overall Vuelta a Burgos
1st Subida al Naranco
2nd Clásica de San Sebastián
2nd Subida a Arrate
2nd Klasika Primavera
5th Overall Vuelta a España

1st Stage 8 (ITT)

6th Overall Volta a Catalunya
7th Overall Vuelta a Murcia
1987
1st Overall Vuelta a Burgos

1st Points classification
1st Prologue & Stage 4

1st Overall Euskal Bizikleta
1st Clásica de San Sebastián
1st Subida a Urkiola
3rd Grand Prix des Nations
3rd Klasika Primavera
4th Overall Giro d'Italia
7th Overall Vuelta a Murcia
9th Overall Volta a Catalunya
9th Coppa Sabatini
10th Overall Tour de France
10th Overall Tour of the Basque Country
1988
1st Overall Vuelta a Burgos

1st Points classification
1st Prologue

1st Overall Escalada a Montjuïc

1st Stages 1a & 1b (ITT)

1st Overall Tour of Galicia
1st Subida a Urkiola
1st Prueba Villafranca de Ordizia
3rd Overall Volta a Catalunya
3rd Giro di Lombardia
3rd GP Navarra
4th Overall Tour of the Basque Country
4th Clásica de San Sebastián
1989
1st Overall Volta a Catalunya
1st Prueba Villafranca de Ordizia
1st Stage 2 Vuelta a La Rioja
2nd Overall Escalada a Montjuïc
4th Milano–Torino
5th Overall Tour de France
8th Overall Tour of the Basque Country
10th Overall Giro d'Italia
1990
1st Overall Vuelta a Burgos

1st Stages 2 & 4

1st Overall Escalada a Montjuïc

1st Stage 1b (ITT)

2nd Overall Volta a Catalunya

1st Points classification

2nd Prueba Villafranca de Ordizia
3rd Trofeo Comunidad Foral de Navarra
3rd Klasika Primavera
4th Züri-Metzgete
5th Overall Tour de France

1st Stage 14

7th Overall Giro d'Italia
8th Giro di Lombardia
10th Clásica de San Sebastián
10th Wincanton Classic
1991
2nd Subida a Urkiola
3rd Overall Vuelta a España
5th Overall Giro d'Italia

1st Stage 5

5th Overall Tour of the Basque Country
7th Liège–Bastogne–Liège
8th La Flèche Wallonne

=== Grand Tour general classification results timeline ===
Grand Tour	1979	1980	1981	1982	1983	1984	1985	1986	1987	1988	1989	1990	1991
/ Vuelta a España	30	5	DNF	1	2	DNF	—	5	34	DNF	19	55	3
Giro d'Italia	—	—	—	—	6	4	5	—	4	—	10	7	5
Tour de France	—	—	35	37	—	—	—	18	10	16	5	5	53

Legend
—	Did not compete
DNF	Did not finish
