= Imanol Murga =

Spanish cyclist

Personal information
- Full name: Imanol Murga Sáez de Ormijana
- Born: 1 January 1958 (age 68) Vitoria-Gasteiz, Spain

Cycling career
- Sport: Cycling
- Discipline: Road
- Role: Rider

Professional teams
- 1980: Flavia-Gios
- 1981: Kelme–Gios
- 1982: Reynolds
- 1984–1990: Orbea–Danena

Major wins
- Grand Tours Vuelta a España 1 individual stage (1981)

Imanol Murga Sáez de Ormijana (born 1 January 1958) is a Spanish former professional racing cyclist. He rode in two editions of the Tour de France and six editions of the Vuelta a España, and won a stage of the 1981 Vuelta a España.

== Major results ==
1980 (1 pro win)
1st Stage 3 Vuelta a las Tres Provincias
3rd Circuito de Getxo
3rd Clásica de Sabiñánigo
4th Road race, National Road Championships
1981 (3)
1st Stage 9 Vuelta a España
1st Prologue (TTT) & Stages 3b & 5 Vuelta a Aragón
1982 (1)
1st Stage 3 Costa del Azahar
1st Prologue (TTT) Vuelta a Andalucía
1st Prologue (TTT) Vuelta a La Rioja
1984
3rd Clasica de Sabiñánigo
6th Klasika Primavera
7th Overall Vuelta a Andalucía
10th Overall Vuelta a Burgos
1985 (1)
1st Stage 4 Vuelta a Cantabria
7th Clásica de San Sebastián
1986
1st Stage 2b (TTT) Vuelta a Murcia
1987 (1)
1st Stage 5 Vuelta a Asturias
