= Álvaro Pino =

Spanish cyclist

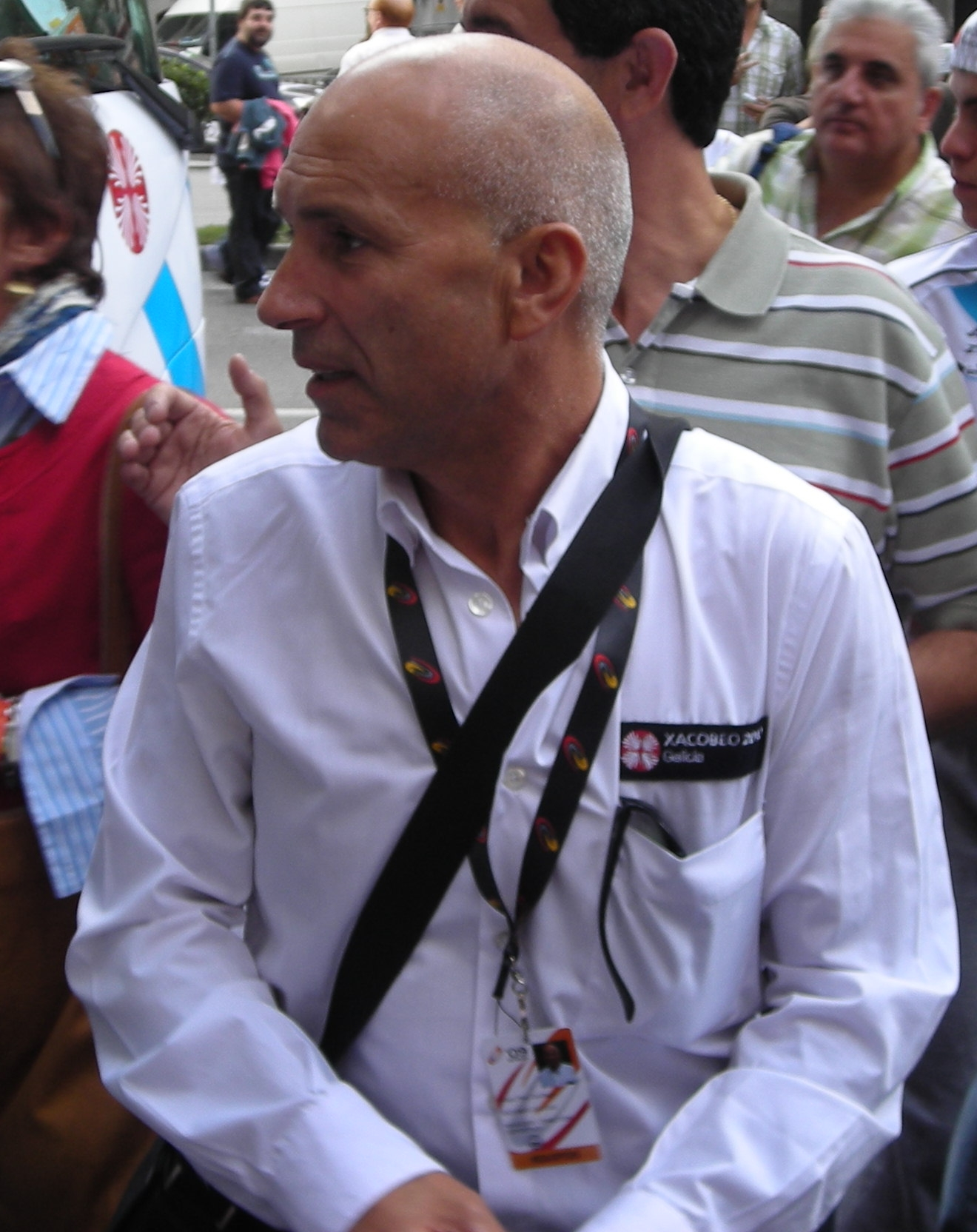

Personal information
- Full name: Álvaro Pino Couñago
- Born: 17 August 1956 (age 70) Ponteareas, Spain

Cycling career
- Sport: Cycling
- Current team: Retired
- Discipline: Road
- Role: Directeur sportif
- Rider type: Climber

Professional teams
- 1981: Colchon
- 1982–1986: Zor
- 1987–1989: BH
- 1990: Seur
- 1991: Kelme

Managerial teams
- 1992–1999: Kelme
- 2002–2005: Phonak
- 2007–2010: Karpin–Galicia

Major wins
- Grand Tours Vuelta a España General classification (1986) Mountains classification (1988) 5 individual stages (1981, 1986, 1988, 1989) Stage races Volta a Catalunya (1987)

Álvaro Pino Couñago (born 17 August 1956) is a former professional road racing cyclist from Galicia who raced between 1981 through 1991 and is most famous for winning the overall title at the 1986 Vuelta a España over favorites Robert Millar from Great Britain, Laurent Fignon from France and Sean Kelly from Ireland. The following year, Pino captured the 1987 Volta a Catalunya and at the 1988 Vuelta, Pino won two stages and the King of the Mountains jersey. In all, he won five stages over his career at the Vuelta a España.

From 2007 through 2010, Pino worked as a directeur sportif for Spanish professional continental team Xacobeo–Galicia.

== Major results ==
1981
1st Stage 19 Vuelta a España
1982
1st Subida al Naranco
1st Stage 2b (ITT) Setmana Catalana de Ciclisme
3rd Overall Vuelta Asturias
5th Overall Tour of the Basque Country
10th Overall Vuelta a España
1983
1st Stage 3 Vuelta a Burgos
2nd Overall Vuelta Asturias
4th Overall Vuelta a España

Held after stages 14 & 15a

9th Tre Valli Varesine
1985
3rd GP Navarra
5th Overall Setmana Catalana de Ciclisme
7th Overall Volta a Catalunya
8th Overall Vuelta a España
9th Clásica de San Sebastián
1986
1st Overall Vuelta a España

1st Stage 21 (ITT)

2nd Overall Volta a Catalunya
8th Overall Tour de France
1987
1st Overall Volta a Catalunya

1st Stages 5 & 8a

1st Overall Escalada a Montjuïc

1st Stage 1a & 1b (ITT)

3rd Subida al Naranco
1988
2nd Overall Tour of Galicia

1st Stage 4

2nd Overall Escalada a Montjuïc
4th Overall Volta a Catalunya
5th Overall Tour of the Basque Country
5th Overall Critérium International
8th Overall Tour de France
8th Overall Vuelta a España

1st Mountains classification
1st Stages 8 & 9 (ITT)

8th Overall Paris–Nice
10th Road race, National Road Championships
1989
1st Clásica de Sabiñánigo
2nd Klasika Primavera
3rd Overall Volta a Catalunya
3rd Overall Vuelta Asturias
3rd Subida al Naranco
5th Overall Vuelta a España

1st Stage 17

5th Overall Tour of the Basque Country

=== Grand Tour general classification results timeline ===
Grand Tour	1981	1982	1983	1984	1985	1986	1987	1988	1989	1990
Vuelta a España	22	10	4	DNF	8	1	—	8	5	DNF
Giro d'Italia	—	30	18	DNF	—	—	—	—	—	—
Tour de France	—	—	—	—	19	8	—	8	16	DNF

Legend
—	Did not compete
DNF	Did not finish
