= Viktor Demidenko =

Soviet bicycle racer (born 1962)

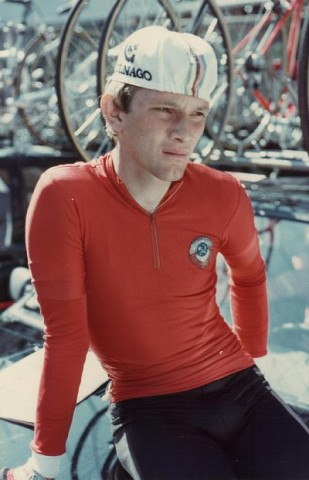

Personal information
- Full name: Viktor Georgevich Demidenko
- Born: 6 June 1962 (age 64) Irkutsk, Russian Soviet Federative Socialist Republic

Cycling career
- Sport: Cycling
- Discipline: Road
- Role: Rider

Major wins
- Grand Tours Vuelta a España 1 individual stage (1986)

Viktor Georgevich Demidenko (Russian: Виктор Георгиевич Демиденко; born 6 June 1962) is a Soviet and Russian former road cyclist. He most notably won a stage of the 1986 Vuelta a España.

== Major results ==
1979
1st Team time trial, UCI Junior Road World Championships
1980
1st Team time trial, UCI Junior Road World Championships
1st Overall Giro della Lunigiana

1st Stages 2 & 3 (ITT)

1981
1st Stage race, Soviet National Road Championships
1982
1st Team time trial, Soviet National Road Championships
2nd Overall Giro delle Regioni

1st Stage 2

3rd Overall Coors Classic

1st Stage 12

10th Overall Circuit Cycliste Sarthe
1983
2nd Overall Ruban Granitier Breton
3rd Overall Giro Ciclistico d'Italia

1st Stage 11 (ITT)

4th Overall Circuit Cycliste Sarthe

1st Stage 3

4th Overall GP Tell
1984
3rd Overall Vuelta a Cuba

1st Stage 1

6th Overall Tour de l'Avenir
1985
3rd Overall Circuit Cycliste Sarthe
1986
1st Stage 18 Vuelta a España
1st Stage 3b (TTT) Tour de l'Avenir
