= List of teams and cyclists in the 1978 Giro d'Italia =

The 1978 Giro d'Italia was the 61st edition of the Giro d'Italia, one of cycling's Grand Tours. The field consisted of 130 riders, and 90 riders finished the race.

== By rider ==
Legend
No.	Starting number worn by the rider during the Giro
Pos.	Position in the general classification
DNF	Denotes a rider who did not finish

No.	Name	Nationality	Team	Ref
1	Felice Gimondi	Italy	Bianchi–Faema	
2	Giovanni Cavalcanti	Italy	Bianchi–Faema	
3	Johan De Muynck	Belgium	Bianchi–Faema	
4	Knut Knudsen	Norway	Bianchi–Faema	
5	Valerio Lualdi	Italy	Bianchi–Faema	
6	Serge Parsani	Italy	Bianchi–Faema	
7	Giancinto Santambrogio	Italy	Bianchi–Faema	
8	Glauco Santoni	Italy	Bianchi–Faema	
9	Willy Singer	West Germany	Bianchi–Faema	
10	Rik Van Linden	Belgium	Bianchi–Faema	
11	Carmelo Barone	Italy	Fiorella–Citroen	
12	Giovanni Battaglin	Italy	Fiorella–Citroen	
13	Aldo Donadello	Italy	Fiorella–Citroen	
14	Josef Fuchs	Switzerland	Fiorella–Citroen	
15	Bernt Johansson	Sweden	Fiorella–Citroen	
16	Riccardo Magrini	Italy	Fiorella–Citroen	
17	Luciano Rossignoli	Italy	Fiorella–Citroen	
18	Mauro Simonetti	Italy	Fiorella–Citroen	
19	Dorino Vanzo	Italy	Fiorella–Citroen	
20	Gianluigi Zuanel	Italy	Fiorella–Citroen	
21	Franco Bitossi	Italy	Gis Gelati	
22	Marino Basso	Italy	Gis Gelati	
23	Leonardo Bevilacqua	Italy	Gis Gelati	
24	Bruce Santeroni	Italy	Gis Gelati	
25	Silvano Cervato	Italy	Gis Gelati	
26	Walter Santeroni	Italy	Gis Gelati	
27	Antonio D'alonzo	Italy	Gis Gelati	
28	Lucio Di Federico	Italy	Gis Gelati	
29	Piero Falorni	Italy	Gis Gelati	
30	Gabriele Landoni	Italy	Gis Gelati	
31	Dietrich Thurau	West Germany	IJsboerke–Gios	
32	Bert Pronk	Netherlands	IJsboerke–Gios	
33	Walter Godefroot	Belgium	IJsboerke–Gios	
34	Ludo Delcroix	Belgium	IJsboerke–Gios	
35	Ludo Peeters	Belgium	IJsboerke–Gios	
36	Rudy Pevenage	Belgium	IJsboerke–Gios	
37	Eric Van De Wiele	Belgium	IJsboerke–Gios	
38	Guido Van Sweevelt	Belgium	IJsboerke–Gios	
39	Jos Jacobs	Belgium	IJsboerke–Gios	
40	Alfons De Bal	Belgium	IJsboerke–Gios	
41	Vittorio Algeri	Italy	Intercontinentale Assicurazioni	
42	Pietro Algeri	Italy	Intercontinentale Assicurazioni	
43	Pierino Amadori	Italy	Intercontinentale Assicurazioni	
44	Alessio Bettoni	Italy	Intercontinentale Assicurazioni	
45	Giancarlo Casiraghi	Italy	Intercontinentale Assicurazioni	
46	Stefano D'arcangelo	Italy	Intercontinentale Assicurazioni	
47	Walter Dusi	Italy	Intercontinentale Assicurazioni	
48	Fiorenzo Favero	Italy	Intercontinentale Assicurazioni	
49	Ettore Manenti	Italy	Intercontinentale Assicurazioni	
50	Paolo Rosola	Italy	Intercontinentale Assicurazioni	
51	Alfio Vandi	Italy	Magniflex–Torpado	
52	Giuseppe Martinelli	Italy	Magniflex–Torpado	
53	Giuseppe Perletto	Italy	Magniflex–Torpado	
54	Ottavio Crepaldi	Italy	Magniflex–Torpado	
55	Vito Da Ros	Italy	Magniflex–Torpado	
56	Giuseppe Fatato	Italy	Magniflex–Torpado	
57	Ruggero Gialdini	Italy	Magniflex–Torpado	
58	Armando Lora	Italy	Magniflex–Torpado	
59	Giancarlo Tartoni	Italy	Magniflex–Torpado	
60	Jean-Claude Fabbri	Italy	Magniflex–Torpado	
61	Roberto Ceruti	Italy	Mecap–Selle Italia	
62	Álvaro Crespi	Italy	Mecap–Selle Italia	
63	Vicenzo De Caro	Italy	Mecap–Selle Italia	
64	Mario Fraccaro	Italy	Mecap–Selle Italia	
65	Luciano Loro	Italy	Mecap–Selle Italia	
66	Dino Porrini	Italy	Mecap–Selle Italia	
67	Giuseppe Rodella	Italy	Mecap–Selle Italia	
68	Angelo Tosoni	Italy	Mecap–Selle Italia	
69	Bruno Zanoni	Italy	Mecap–Selle Italia	
70	Sergio Santimaria	Italy	Mecap–Selle Italia	
71	Francesco Moser	Italy	Sanson–Campagnolo	
72	Roger De Vlaeminck	Belgium	Sanson–Campagnolo	
73	Claudio Bortolotto	Italy	Sanson–Campagnolo	
74	Willy De Geest	Belgium	Sanson–Campagnolo	
75	Ronald De Witte	Belgium	Sanson–Campagnolo	
76	Phil Edwards	Great Britain	Sanson–Campagnolo	
77	Fabrizio Fabbri	Italy	Sanson–Campagnolo	
78	Simone Fraccaro	Italy	Sanson–Campagnolo	
79	Palmiro Masciarelli	Italy	Sanson–Campagnolo	
80	Attilio Rota	Italy	Sanson–Campagnolo	
81	Gianbattista Baronchelli	Italy	Scic–Bottecchia	
82	Gaetano Baronchelli	Italy	Scic–Bottecchia	
83	Giuseppe Saronni	Italy	Scic–Bottecchia	
84	Enrico Paolini	Italy	Scic–Bottecchia	
85	Roy Schuiten	Netherlands	Scic–Bottecchia	
86	Osvaldo Bettoni	Italy	Scic–Bottecchia	
87	Walter Riccomi	Italy	Scic–Bottecchia	
88	Arnaldo Caverzasi	Italy	Scic–Bottecchia	
89	Luciano Conati	Italy	Scic–Bottecchia	
90	Walter Polini	Italy	Scic–Bottecchia	
91	Fausto Bertoglio	Italy	Selle Royal–Inoxpran	
92	Alessio Antonini	Italy	Selle Royal–Inoxpran	
93	Alfredo Chinetti	Italy	Selle Royal–Inoxpran	
94	Hans-Peter Jakst	West Germany	Selle Royal–Inoxpran	
95	Luca Olivetto	Italy	Selle Royal–Inoxpran	
96	Marcello Osler	Italy	Selle Royal–Inoxpran	
97	Aldo Parecchini	Italy	Selle Royal–Inoxpran	
98	Pasquale Pugliese	Italy	Selle Royal–Inoxpran	
99	Bruno Vicino	Italy	Selle Royal–Inoxpran	
100	Carlo Zoni	Italy	Selle Royal–Inoxpran	
101	Miguel María Lasa	Spain	Teka	
102	Pedro Torres	Spain	Teka	
103	Jürgen Kraft	West Germany	Teka	
104	Pedro Vilardebo	Spain	Teka	
105	Fernando Cabrero	Spain	Teka	
106	Francisco Javier Cedena	Spain	Teka	
107	Miguel-Mayor Guttierez	Spain	Teka	
108	Paolino Martinez	Spain	Teka	
109	Pedro Larrinaga	Spain	Teka	
110	Antonio Menéndez	Spain	Teka	
111	Davide Boifava	Italy	Vibor	
112	Luciano Borgognoni	Italy	Vibor	
113	Corrado Donadio	Italy	Vibor	
114	Gianfranco Foresti	Italy	Vibor	
115	Renato Laghi	Italy	Vibor	
116	Flavio Miozzo	Italy	Vibor	
117	Gabriele Mugnaini	Italy	Vibor	
118	Wladimiro Panizza	Italy	Vibor	
119	Remo Rocchia	Italy	Vibor	
120	Roberto Visentini	Italy	Vibor	
121	Roberto Poggiali	Italy	Zonca–Santini	
122	Claudio Corti	Italy	Zonca–Santini	
123	Giancarlo Bellini	Italy	Zonca–Santini	
124	Pierino Gavazzi	Italy	Zonca–Santini	
125	Ueli Sutter	Switzerland	Zonca–Santini	
126	Claudio Torelli	Italy	Zonca–Santini	
127	Leonardo Mazzantini	Italy	Zonca–Santini	
128	Piero Spinelli	Italy	Zonca–Santini	
129	Emilio Vanotti	Italy	Zonca–Santini	
130	Bruno Wolfer	Switzerland	Zonca–Santini	
