= 1977 Giro d'Italia, Stage 11 to Stage 22 =

Cycling race stages

The 1977 Giro d'Italia was the 60th edition of the Giro d'Italia, one of cycling's Grand Tours. The Giro began with a prologue individual time trial in Bacoli on 20 May, and Stage 11 occurred on 31 May with a mountainous stage from Salsomaggiore Terme. The race finished in Milan on 12 June.

== Stage 11 ==
31 May 1977 — Salsomaggiore Terme to Santa Margherita Ligure, 198 km (123 mi)

Stage 11 result

Rank	Rider	Team	Time
1	Claudio Bortolotto (ITA)	Sanson	5h 27' 07"
2	Enrico Paolini (ITA)	Scic	+ 1' 05"
3	Wilmo Francioni (ITA)	Magniflex–Torpado	s.t.
4	Francesco Moser (ITA)	Sanson	+ 1' 07"
5	Pierino Gavazzi (ITA)	Jollj Ceramica	s.t.
6	Miguel María Lasa (ESP)	Teka	s.t.
7	Luciano Borgognoni (ITA)	Vibor	s.t.
8	Felice Gimondi (ITA)	Bianchi–Campagnolo	s.t.
9	Michel Pollentier (BEL)	Flandria–Velda–Latina Assicurazioni	s.t.
10	Vittorio Algeri (ITA)	G.B.C.–Itla	s.t.

General classification after Stage 11

Rank	Rider	Team	Time
1	Francesco Moser (ITA)	Sanson	54h 58' 33"
2	Michel Pollentier (BEL)	Flandria–Velda–Latina Assicurazioni	+ 55"
3	Gianbattista Baronchelli (ITA)	Scic	+ 1' 15"
4	Wladimiro Panizza (ITA)	Scic	+ 2' 16"
5	Ronald De Witte (BEL)	Brooklyn	+ 2' 42"
6	Johan De Muynck (BEL)	Brooklyn	+ 2' 56"
7	Felice Gimondi (ITA)	Bianchi–Campagnolo	+ 3' 08"
8	José Viejo (ESP)	Kas–Campagnolo	+ 4' 01"
9	Giancarlo Bellini (ITA)	Brooklyn	+ 4' 06"
10	Alfio Vandi (ITA)	Magniflex–Torpado	+ 4' 11"

== Rest day ==
1 June 1977

== Stage 12 ==
2 June 1977 — Santa Margherita Ligure-San Giacomo di Roburent, 160 km (99 mi)

Stage 12 result

Rank	Rider	Team	Time
~~1~~	~~Miguel María Lasa (ESP)~~	~~Teka~~	~~4h 23' 19"~~
1	Wilmo Francioni (ITA)	Magniflex–Torpado	4h 23' 20"
2	Michel Pollentier (BEL)	Flandria–Velda–Latina Assicurazioni	s.t.
4	José Viejo (ESP)	Kas–Campagnolo	s.t.
5	Felice Gimondi (ITA)	Bianchi–Campagnolo	+ 11"
6	Ronald De Witte (BEL)	Brooklyn	s.t.
7	Mario Beccia (ITA)	Sanson	s.t.
8	Vittorio Algeri (ITA)	G.B.C.–Itla	s.t.
9	Gianbattista Baronchelli (ITA)	Scic	s.t.
10	Johan De Muynck (BEL)	Brooklyn	s.t.

General classification after Stage 12

Rank	Rider	Team	Time
1	Francesco Moser (ITA)	Sanson	59h 22' 20"
2	Michel Pollentier (BEL)	Flandria–Velda–Latina Assicurazioni	+ 22"
3	Gianbattista Baronchelli (ITA)	Scic	+ 52"
4	Wladimiro Panizza (ITA)	Scic	+ 1' 53"
5	Ronald De Witte (BEL)	Brooklyn	+ 2' 19"
6	Johan De Muynck (BEL)	Brooklyn	+ 2' 33"
7	Felice Gimondi (ITA)	Bianchi–Campagnolo	+ 2' 45"
8	José Viejo (ESP)	Kas–Campagnolo	+ 3' 28"
9	Miguel María Lasa (ESP)	Teka	+ 3' 46"
10	Mario Beccia (ITA)	Sanson	+ 3' 59"

== Stage 13 ==
3 June 1977 — Mondovì to Varzi, 192 km (119 mi)

Stage 13 result

Rank	Rider	Team	Time
1	Giancarlo Tartoni (ITA)	Magniflex–Torpado	4h 59' 23"
2	Aldo Parecchini (ITA)	Brooklyn	s.t.
3	Annunzio Colombo (ITA)	Zonca–Santini	+ 8"
4	Gianfranco Foresti (ITA)	Scic	+ 2' 41"
5	Alessio Antonini (ITA)	Jollj Ceramica	+ 3' 28"
6	Johan De Muynck (BEL)	Brooklyn	+ 3' 30"
7	Francesco Moser (ITA)	Sanson	+ 3' 48"
8	Gianbattista Baronchelli (ITA)	Scic	s.t.
9	Miguel María Lasa (ESP)	Teka	s.t.
10	Michel Pollentier (BEL)	Flandria–Velda–Latina Assicurazioni	s.t.

General classification after Stage 13

Rank	Rider	Team	Time
1	Francesco Moser (ITA)	Sanson	64h 25' 37"
2	Michel Pollentier (BEL)	Flandria–Velda–Latina Assicurazioni	+ 22"
3	Gianbattista Baronchelli (ITA)	Scic	+ 52"
4	Wladimiro Panizza (ITA)	Scic	+ 1' 53"
5	Johan De Muynck (BEL)	Brooklyn	+ 2' 15"
6	Ronald De Witte (BEL)	Brooklyn	+ 2' 19"
7	Felice Gimondi (ITA)	Bianchi–Campagnolo	+ 2' 45"
8	José Viejo (ESP)	Kas–Campagnolo	+ 3' 28"
9	Miguel María Lasa (ESP)	Teka	+ 3' 46"
10	Mario Beccia (ITA)	Sanson	+ 3' 59"

== Stage 14 ==
4 June 1977 — Voghera to Vicenza, 247 km (153 mi)

Stage 14 result

Rank	Rider	Team	Time
1	Marc Demeyer (BEL)	Flandria–Velda–Latina Assicurazioni	5h 57' 50"
2	Marino Basso (ITA)	Selle Royal–Contour	s.t.
3	Pierino Gavazzi (ITA)	Jollj Ceramica	s.t.
4	Enrico Paolini (ITA)	Scic	s.t.
5	Aldo Parecchini (ITA)	Brooklyn	s.t.
6	Ercole Gualazzini (ITA)	Scic	s.t.
7	Knut Knudsen (NOR)	Jollj Ceramica	s.t.
8	Francesco Moser (ITA)	Sanson	s.t.
9	Luciano Borgognoni (ITA)	Vibor	s.t.
10	Leonardo Mazzantini (ITA)	Zonca–Santini	s.t.

General classification after Stage 14

Rank	Rider	Team	Time
1	Francesco Moser (ITA)	Sanson	70h 23' 27"
2	Michel Pollentier (BEL)	Flandria–Velda–Latina Assicurazioni	+ 22"
3	Gianbattista Baronchelli (ITA)	Scic	+ 52"
4	Wladimiro Panizza (ITA)	Scic	+ 1' 53"
5	Johan De Muynck (BEL)	Brooklyn	+ 2' 15"
6	Ronald De Witte (BEL)	Brooklyn	+ 2' 19"
7	Felice Gimondi (ITA)	Bianchi–Campagnolo	+ 2' 45"
8	José Viejo (ESP)	Kas–Campagnolo	+ 3' 28"
9	Miguel María Lasa (ESP)	Teka	+ 3' 46"
10	Mario Beccia (ITA)	Sanson	+ 3' 59"

== Stage 15 ==
5 June 1977 — Vicenza to Trieste, 223 km (139 mi)

Stage 15 result

Rank	Rider	Team	Time
1	Ercole Gualazzini (ITA)	Scic	5h 31' 41"
2	Marc Demeyer (BEL)	Flandria–Velda–Latina Assicurazioni	s.t.
3	Pierino Gavazzi (ITA)	Jollj Ceramica	s.t.
4	Marino Basso (ITA)	Selle Royal–Contour	s.t.
5	Luciano Borgognoni (ITA)	Vibor	s.t.
6	Ignazio Paleari (ITA)	Fiorella–Mocassini	s.t.
7	Herman Van der Slagmolen (BEL)	Brooklyn	s.t.
8	Enrico Paolini (ITA)	Scic	s.t.
9	Rik Van Linden (BEL)	Bianchi–Campagnolo	s.t.
10	Jürgen Kraft (FRG)	Selle Royal–Contour	s.t.

General classification after Stage 15

Rank	Rider	Team	Time
1	Francesco Moser (ITA)	Sanson	75h 55' 08"
2	Michel Pollentier (BEL)	Flandria–Velda–Latina Assicurazioni	+ 22"
3	Gianbattista Baronchelli (ITA)	Scic	+ 52"
4	Wladimiro Panizza (ITA)	Scic	+ 1' 53"
5	Johan De Muynck (BEL)	Brooklyn	+ 2' 15"
6	Ronald De Witte (BEL)	Brooklyn	+ 2' 19"
7	Felice Gimondi (ITA)	Bianchi–Campagnolo	+ 2' 45"
8	José Viejo (ESP)	Kas–Campagnolo	+ 3' 28"
9	Miguel María Lasa (ESP)	Teka	+ 3' 46"
10	Mario Beccia (ITA)	Sanson	+ 3' 59"

== Stage 16a ==
6 June 1977 — Trieste to Gemona del Friuli, 107 km (66 mi)

Stage 16a result

Rank	Rider	Team	Time
1	Marc Demeyer (BEL)	Flandria–Velda–Latina Assicurazioni	2h 43' 52"
2	Marino Basso (ITA)	Selle Royal–Contour	s.t.
3	Pierino Gavazzi (ITA)	Jollj Ceramica	s.t.
4	Enrico Paolini (ITA)	Scic	s.t.
5	Jesús Suárez Cueva (ESP)	Teka	s.t.
6	Marcello Osler (ITA)	Brooklyn	s.t.
7	Rik Van Linden (BEL)	Bianchi–Campagnolo	s.t.
8	Ignazio Paleari (ITA)	Fiorella–Mocassini	s.t.
9	Aldo Parecchini (ITA)	Brooklyn	s.t.
10	Herman Van der Slagmolen (BEL)	Brooklyn	s.t.

General classification after Stage 16a

Rank	Rider	Team	Time
1	Francesco Moser (ITA)	Sanson	

== Stage 16b ==
6 June 1977 — Gemona del Friuli to Conegliano, 116 km (72 mi)

Stage 16b result

Rank	Rider	Team	Time
1	Pierino Gavazzi (ITA)	Jollj Ceramica	2h 42' 23"
2	Marc Demeyer (BEL)	Flandria–Velda–Latina Assicurazioni	s.t.
3	Marino Basso (ITA)	Selle Royal–Contour	s.t.
4	Ercole Gualazzini (ITA)	Scic	s.t.
5	Ignazio Paleari (ITA)	Fiorella–Mocassini	s.t.
6	Luciano Borgognoni (ITA)	Vibor	s.t.
7	Bruno Vicino (ITA)	G.B.C.–Itla	s.t.
8	Aldo Parecchini (ITA)	Brooklyn	s.t.
9	Rik Van Linden (BEL)	Bianchi–Campagnolo	s.t.
10	Carmello Barone (ITA)	Fiorella–Mocassini	s.t.

General classification after Stage 16b

Rank	Rider	Team	Time
1	Francesco Moser (ITA)	Sanson	81h 21' 23"
2	Michel Pollentier (BEL)	Flandria–Velda–Latina Assicurazioni	+ 22"
3	Gianbattista Baronchelli (ITA)	Scic	+ 52"
4	Wladimiro Panizza (ITA)	Scic	+ 1' 53"
5	Johan De Muynck (BEL)	Brooklyn	+ 2' 15"
6	Ronald De Witte (BEL)	Brooklyn	+ 2' 19"
7	Felice Gimondi (ITA)	Bianchi–Campagnolo	+ 2' 45"
8	José Viejo (ESP)	Kas–Campagnolo	+ 3' 28"
9	Miguel María Lasa (ESP)	Teka	+ 3' 46"
10	Mario Beccia (ITA)	Sanson	+ 3' 59"

== Stage 17 ==
7 June 1977 — Conegliano to Cortina d'Ampezzo, 220 km (140 mi)

Stage 17 result

Rank	Rider	Team	Time
1	Giuseppe Perletto (ITA)	Magniflex–Torpado	6h 43' 35"
2	Mario Beccia (ITA)	Sanson	+ 9"
3	Michel Pollentier (BEL)	Flandria–Velda–Latina Assicurazioni	s.t.
4	Claudio Bortolotto (ITA)	Sanson	+ 33"
5	Francesco Moser (ITA)	Sanson	+ 34"
6	Alfio Vandi (ITA)	Magniflex–Torpado	+ 39"
7	Wladimiro Panizza (ITA)	Scic	s.t.
8	Josef Fuchs (SUI)	Sanson	+ 57"
9	Ueli Sutter (SUI)	Zonca–Santini	+ 1' 24"
10	Ronald De Witte (BEL)	Brooklyn	+ 2' 04"

General classification after Stage 17

Rank	Rider	Team	Time
1	Michel Pollentier (BEL)	Flandria–Velda–Latina Assicurazioni	88h 05' 29"
2	Francesco Moser (ITA)	Sanson	+ 3"
3	Wladimiro Panizza (ITA)	Scic	+ 2' 01"
4	Gianbattista Baronchelli (ITA)	Scic	+ 2' 25"
5	Mario Beccia (ITA)	Sanson	+ 3' 37"
6	Ronald De Witte (BEL)	Brooklyn	+ 3' 52"
7	Alfio Vandi (ITA)	Magniflex–Torpado	+ 4' 08"
8	Walter Riccomi (ITA)	Scic	+ 5' 55"
9	Claudio Bortolotto (ITA)	Sanson	+ 7' 46"
10	Tino Conti (ITA)	Zonca–Santini	+ 9' 55"

== Stage 18 ==
8 June 1977 — Cortina d'Ampezzo to Pinzolo, 223 km (139 mi)

Stage 18 result

Rank	Rider	Team	Time
1	Gianbattista Baronchelli (ITA)	Scic	7h 00' 28"
2	Michel Pollentier (BEL)	Flandria–Velda–Latina Assicurazioni	s.t.
3	Giuseppe Perletto (ITA)	Magniflex–Torpado	+ 49"
4	Bernt Johansson (SWE)	Fiorella–Mocassini	+ 1' 25"
5	Felice Gimondi (ITA)	Bianchi–Campagnolo	s.t.
6	Amilcare Sgalbazzi (ITA)	Jollj Ceramica	s.t.
7	Francesco Moser (ITA)	Sanson	s.t.
8	Miguel María Lasa (ESP)	Teka	s.t.
9	Alfredo Chinetti (ITA)	Jollj Ceramica	s.t.
10	Gonzalo Aja (ESP)	Teka	s.t.

General classification after Stage 18

Rank	Rider	Team	Time
1	Michel Pollentier (BEL)	Flandria–Velda–Latina Assicurazioni	95h 05' 57"
2	Francesco Moser (ITA)	Sanson	+ 1' 28"
3	Gianbattista Baronchelli (ITA)	Scic	+ 2' 25"
4	Ronald De Witte (BEL)	Brooklyn	+ 5' 25"
5	Alfio Vandi (ITA)	Magniflex–Torpado	+ 5' 33"
6	Wladimiro Panizza (ITA)	Scic	+ 5' 56"
7	Mario Beccia (ITA)	Sanson	+ 7' 32"
8	Walter Riccomi (ITA)	Scic	+ 7' 34"
9	Claudio Bortolotto (ITA)	Sanson	+ 9' 25"
10	Miguel María Lasa (ESP)	Teka	+ 11' 31"

== Stage 19 ==
9 June 1977 — Pinzolo to San Pellegrino Terme, 205 km (127 mi)

Stage 19 result

Rank	Rider	Team	Time
1	Renato Laghi (ITA)	Vibor	5h 47' 43"
2	Gaetano Baronchelli (ITA)	Scic	+ 1' 32"
3	Jürgen Kraft (FRG)	Selle Royal–Contour	+ 1' 51"
4	Domingo Perurena (ESP)	Kas–Campagnolo	s.t.
5	Pasquale Pugliese (ITA)	Zonca–Santini	+ 2' 52"
6	Alberto Caiumi (ITA)	Selle Royal–Contour	s.t.
7	Vittorio Algeri (ITA)	G.B.C.–Itla	+ 3' 23"
8	Alfio Vandi (ITA)	Magniflex–Torpado	s.t.
9	Johan De Muynck (BEL)	Brooklyn	s.t.
10	Gianbattista Baronchelli (ITA)	Scic	s.t.

General classification after Stage 19

Rank	Rider	Team	Time
1	Michel Pollentier (BEL)	Flandria–Velda–Latina Assicurazioni	100h 57' 03"
2	Francesco Moser (ITA)	Sanson	+ 2' 02"
3	Gianbattista Baronchelli (ITA)	Scic	+ 2' 25"
4	Alfio Vandi (ITA)	Magniflex–Torpado	+ 5' 33"
5	Wladimiro Panizza (ITA)	Scic	+ 5' 56"
6	Ronald De Witte (BEL)	Brooklyn	+ 7' 03"
7	Walter Riccomi (ITA)	Scic	+ 8' 27"
8	Mario Beccia (ITA)	Sanson	+ 9' 58"
9	Claudio Bortolotto (ITA)	Sanson	+ 10' 18"
10	Miguel María Lasa (ESP)	Teka	+ 14' 14"

== Stage 20 ==
10 June 1977 — San Pellegrino Terme to Varese, 138 km (86 mi)

Stage 20 result

Rank	Rider	Team	Time
1	Wilmo Francioni (ITA)	Magniflex–Torpado	3h 18' 14"
2	Serge Parsani (ITA)	Bianchi–Campagnolo	+ 4"
3	Valerio Lualdi (ITA)	Sanson	+ 10"
4	Willy De Geest (BEL)	Brooklyn	s.t.
5	Pedro Vilardebo (ESP)	Teka	s.t.
6	Alessio Antonini (ITA)	Jollj Ceramica	s.t.
7	Alfredo Chinetti (ITA)	Jollj Ceramica	s.t.
8	Leonardo Mazzantini (ITA)	Zonca–Santini	s.t.
9	José Grande (ESP)	Teka	s.t.
10	Simone Fraccaro (ITA)	Jollj Ceramica	s.t.

General classification after Stage 20

Rank	Rider	Team	Time
1	Michel Pollentier (BEL)	Flandria–Velda–Latina Assicurazioni	104h 16' 20"
2	Francesco Moser (ITA)	Sanson	+ 2' 02"
3	Gianbattista Baronchelli (ITA)	Scic	+ 2' 25"
4	Wladimiro Panizza (ITA)	Scic	+ 5' 23"
5	Alfio Vandi (ITA)	Magniflex–Torpado	+ 5' 33"
6	Ronald De Witte (BEL)	Brooklyn	+ 7' 03"
7	Walter Riccomi (ITA)	Scic	+ 8' 27"
8	Mario Beccia (ITA)	Sanson	+ 9' 58"
9	Claudio Bortolotto (ITA)	Sanson	+ 10' 18"
10	Wilmo Francioni (ITA)	Magniflex–Torpado	+ 14' 08"

== Stage 21 ==
11 June 1977 — Binago to Binago, 29 km (18 mi) (ITT)

Stage 21 result

Rank	Rider	Team	Time
1	Michel Pollentier (BEL)	Flandria–Velda–Latina Assicurazioni	36' 09"
2	Francesco Moser (ITA)	Sanson	+ 30"
3	Knut Knudsen (NOR)	Jollj Ceramica	+ 1' 07"
4	Jørgen Marcussen (DEN)	Vibor	+ 1' 27"
5	Gianbattista Baronchelli (ITA)	Scic	+ 1' 37"
6	Wilmo Francioni (ITA)	Magniflex–Torpado	+ 2' 03"
7	Alfio Vandi (ITA)	Magniflex–Torpado	+ 2' 17"
8	Ueli Sutter (SUI)	Zonca–Santini	+ 2' 19"
9	Luciano Borgognoni (ITA)	Vibor	s.t.
10	Miguel María Lasa (ESP)	Teka	+ 2' 23"

General classification after Stage 21

Rank	Rider	Team	Time
1	Michel Pollentier (BEL)	Flandria–Velda–Latina Assicurazioni	104h 52' 29"
2	Francesco Moser (ITA)	Sanson	+ 2' 32"
3	Gianbattista Baronchelli (ITA)	Scic	+ 4' 02"
4	Alfio Vandi (ITA)	Magniflex–Torpado	+ 7' 50"
5	Wladimiro Panizza (ITA)	Scic	+ 7' 56"
6	Ronald De Witte (BEL)	Brooklyn	+ 10' 04"
7	Walter Riccomi (ITA)	Scic	+ 12' 28"
8	Claudio Bortolotto (ITA)	Sanson	+ 13' 41"
9	Mario Beccia (ITA)	Sanson	+ 13' 48"
10	Wilmo Francioni (ITA)	Magniflex–Torpado	+ 16' 11"

== Stage 22 ==
12 June 1977 — Milan to Milan, 122 km (76 mi)

Stage 22 result

Rank	Rider	Team	Time
1	Luciano Borgognoni (ITA)	Vibor	2h 34' 47"
2	Marc Demeyer (BEL)	Flandria–Velda–Latina Assicurazioni	s.t.
3	Enrico Paolini (ITA)	Scic	s.t.
4	Javier Elorriaga (ESP)	Teka	s.t.
5	Aldo Parecchini (ITA)	Brooklyn	s.t.
6	Roberto Ceruti (ITA)	G.B.C.–Itla	s.t.
7	Jesús Suárez Cueva (ESP)	Teka	s.t.
8	Pierino Gavazzi (ITA)	Jollj Ceramica	s.t.
9	Ignazio Paleari (ITA)	Fiorella–Mocassini	s.t.
10	Alfredo Chinetti (ITA)	Jollj Ceramica	s.t.

General classification after Stage 22

Rank	Rider	Team	Time
1	Michel Pollentier (BEL)	Flandria–Velda–Latina Assicurazioni	107h 27' 16"
2	Francesco Moser (ITA)	Sanson	+ 2' 32"
3	Gianbattista Baronchelli (ITA)	Scic	+ 4' 02"
4	Alfio Vandi (ITA)	Magniflex–Torpado	+ 7' 50"
5	Wladimiro Panizza (ITA)	Scic	+ 7' 56"
6	Ronald De Witte (BEL)	Brooklyn	+ 10' 04"
7	Walter Riccomi (ITA)	Scic	+ 12' 28"
8	Claudio Bortolotto (ITA)	Sanson	+ 13' 41"
9	Mario Beccia (ITA)	Sanson	+ 13' 48"
10	Wilmo Francioni (ITA)	Magniflex–Torpado	+ 16' 11"
