= 1977 Giro d'Italia, Prologue to Stage 10 =

Cycling race stages

The 1977 Giro d'Italia was the 60th edition of the Giro d'Italia, one of cycling's Grand Tours. The Giro began with a prologue individual time trial in Bacoli on 20 May, and Stage 10 occurred on 30 May with a mountainous stage to Salsomaggiore Terme. The race finished in Milan on 12 June.

== Prologue ==
20 May 1977 — Bacoli to Monte di Procida, 7.5 km (4.7 mi) (ITT)

Prologue result

Rank	Rider	Team	Time
1	Freddy Maertens (BEL)	Flandria–Velda–Latina Assicurazioni	11' 03"
2	Francesco Moser (ITA)	Sanson	+ 3"
3	Knut Knudsen (NOR)	Jollj Ceramica	+ 20"
4	Johan De Muynck (BEL)	Brooklyn	+ 21"
5	Gianbattista Baronchelli (ITA)	Scic	+ 25"
6	José Enrique Cima (ESP)	Kas–Campagnolo	+ 30"
7	Michel Pollentier (BEL)	Flandria–Velda–Latina Assicurazioni	+ 31"
8	Wladimiro Panizza (ITA)	Scic	s.t.
9	Faustino Fernández Ovies (ESP)	Kas–Campagnolo	+ 33"
10	Felice Gimondi (ITA)	Bianchi–Campagnolo	s.t.

== Stage 1 ==
21 May 1977 — Lago Miseno to Avellino, 159 km (99 mi)

Stage 1 result

Rank	Rider	Team	Time
1	Freddy Maertens (BEL)	Flandria–Velda–Latina Assicurazioni	4h 03' 57"
2	Marino Basso (ITA)	Selle Royal–Contour	s.t.
3	Ercole Gualazzini (ITA)	Scic	s.t.
4	Ronald De Witte (BEL)	Brooklyn	s.t.
5	Alessio Antonini (ITA)	Jollj Ceramica	s.t.
6	Jürgen Kraft (FRG)	Selle Royal–Contour	s.t.
7	Aldo Parecchini (ITA)	Brooklyn	s.t.
8	Wilmo Francioni (ITA)	Magniflex–Torpado	s.t.
9	Miguel María Lasa (ESP)	Teka	s.t.
10	Sebastián Pozo (ESP)	Kas–Campagnolo	s.t.

General classification after Stage 1

Rank	Rider	Team	Time
1	Freddy Maertens (BEL)	Flandria–Velda–Latina Assicurazioni	4h 15' 00"
2	Francesco Moser (ITA)	Sanson	+ 3"
3	Knut Knudsen (NOR)	Jollj Ceramica	+ 20"
4	Johan De Muynck (BEL)	Brooklyn	+ 21"
5	Gianbattista Baronchelli (ITA)	Scic	+ 25"
6	José Enrique Cima (ESP)	Kas–Campagnolo	+ 30"
7	Michel Pollentier (BEL)	Flandria–Velda–Latina Assicurazioni	+ 31"
8	Wladimiro Panizza (ITA)	Scic	s.t.
9	Faustino Fernández Ovies (ESP)	Kas–Campagnolo	+ 33"
10	Felice Gimondi (ITA)	Bianchi–Campagnolo	s.t.

== Stage 2a ==
22 May 1977 — Avellino to Foggia, 118 km (73 mi)

Stage 2a result

Rank	Rider	Team	Time
1	Rik Van Linden (BEL)	Bianchi–Campagnolo	3h 16' 02"
2	Ercole Gualazzini (ITA)	Scic	s.t.
3	Marino Basso (ITA)	Selle Royal–Contour	s.t.
4	Ignazio Paleari (ITA)	Fiorella–Mocassini	s.t.
5	Pierino Gavazzi (ITA)	Jollj Ceramica	s.t.
6	Freddy Maertens (BEL)	Flandria–Velda–Latina Assicurazioni	s.t.
7	Bruno Vicino (ITA)	G.B.C.–Itla	s.t.
8	Francesco Moser (ITA)	Sanson	s.t.
9	Leonardo Mazzantini (ITA)	Zonca–Santini	s.t.
10	Luciano Borgognoni (ITA)	Vibor	s.t.

General classification after Stage 2a

Rank	Rider	Team	Time
1	Freddy Maertens (BEL)	Flandria–Velda–Latina Assicurazioni	

== Stage 2b ==
22 May 1977 — Foggia to Foggia, 65 km (40 mi)

Stage 2b result

Rank	Rider	Team	Time
1	Luciano Borgognoni (ITA)	Vibor	1h 28' 53"
2	Freddy Maertens (BEL)	Flandria–Velda–Latina Assicurazioni	s.t.
3	Francesco Moser (ITA)	Sanson	s.t.
4	Ercole Gualazzini (ITA)	Scic	s.t.
5	Bruno Vicino (ITA)	G.B.C.–Itla	s.t.
6	Aldo Parecchini (ITA)	Brooklyn	s.t.
7	Marcello Osler (ITA)	Brooklyn	s.t.
8	Jürgen Kraft (FRG)	Selle Royal–Contour	s.t.
9	Leonardo Mazzantini (ITA)	Zonca–Santini	s.t.
10	Gianfranco Foresti (ITA)	Scic	s.t.

General classification after Stage 2b

Rank	Rider	Team	Time
1	Freddy Maertens (BEL)	Flandria–Velda–Latina Assicurazioni	8h 59' 55"
2	Francesco Moser (ITA)	Sanson	+ 3"
3	Knut Knudsen (NOR)	Jollj Ceramica	+ 20"
4	Johan De Muynck (BEL)	Brooklyn	+ 21"
5	Gianbattista Baronchelli (ITA)	Scic	+ 25"
6	José Enrique Cima (ESP)	Kas–Campagnolo	+ 30"
7	Michel Pollentier (BEL)	Flandria–Velda–Latina Assicurazioni	+ 31"
8	Wladimiro Panizza (ITA)	Scic	s.t.
9	Faustino Fernández Ovies (ESP)	Kas–Campagnolo	+ 33"
10	Felice Gimondi (ITA)	Bianchi–Campagnolo	s.t.

== Stage 3 ==
23 May 1977 — Foggia to Isernia, 166 km (103 mi)

Stage 3 result

Rank	Rider	Team	Time
1	Simone Fraccaro (ITA)	Jollj Ceramica	4h 55' 34"
2	Wilmo Francioni (ITA)	Magniflex–Torpado	s.t.
3	Freddy Maertens (BEL)	Flandria–Velda–Latina Assicurazioni	s.t.
4	Pierino Gavazzi (ITA)	Jollj Ceramica	s.t.
5	Luciano Borgognoni (ITA)	Vibor	s.t.
6	Francesco Moser (ITA)	Sanson	s.t.
7	Marino Basso (ITA)	Selle Royal–Contour	s.t.
8	Bruno Vicino (ITA)	G.B.C.–Itla	s.t.
9	Roberto Ceruti (ITA)	G.B.C.–Itla	s.t.
10	Riccardo Magrini (ITA)	Fiorella–Mocassini	s.t.

General classification after Stage 3

Rank	Rider	Team	Time
1	Freddy Maertens (BEL)	Flandria–Velda–Latina Assicurazioni	13h 55' 29"
2	Francesco Moser (ITA)	Sanson	+ 3"
3	Knut Knudsen (NOR)	Jollj Ceramica	+ 20"
4	Johan De Muynck (BEL)	Brooklyn	+ 21"
5	Gianbattista Baronchelli (ITA)	Scic	+ 25"
6	José Enrique Cima (ESP)	Kas–Campagnolo	+ 30"
7	Michel Pollentier (BEL)	Flandria–Velda–Latina Assicurazioni	+ 31"
8	Wladimiro Panizza (ITA)	Scic	s.t.
9	Faustino Fernández Ovies (ESP)	Kas–Campagnolo	+ 33"
10	Felice Gimondi (ITA)	Bianchi–Campagnolo	s.t.

== Stage 4 ==
24 May 1977 — Isernia to Pescara, 228 km (142 mi)

Stage 4 result

Rank	Rider	Team	Time
1	Freddy Maertens (BEL)	Flandria–Velda–Latina Assicurazioni	6h 46' 24"
2	Rik Van Linden (BEL)	Bianchi–Campagnolo	s.t.
3	Luciano Borgognoni (ITA)	Vibor	s.t.
4	Ercole Gualazzini (ITA)	Scic	s.t.
5	Aldo Parecchini (ITA)	Brooklyn	s.t.
6	Ignazio Paleari (ITA)	Fiorella–Mocassini	s.t.
7	Giuseppe Martinelli (ITA)	Jollj Ceramica	s.t.
8	Bruno Vicino (ITA)	G.B.C.–Itla	s.t.
9	Herman Van der Slagmolen (BEL)	Brooklyn	s.t.
10	Enrico Paolini (ITA)	Scic	s.t.

General classification after Stage 4

Rank	Rider	Team	Time
1	Freddy Maertens (BEL)	Flandria–Velda–Latina Assicurazioni	20h 41' 53"
2	Francesco Moser (ITA)	Sanson	+ 3"
3	Knut Knudsen (NOR)	Jollj Ceramica	+ 20"
4	Johan De Muynck (BEL)	Brooklyn	+ 21"
5	Gianbattista Baronchelli (ITA)	Scic	+ 25"
6	José Enrique Cima (ESP)	Kas–Campagnolo	+ 30"
7	Michel Pollentier (BEL)	Flandria–Velda–Latina Assicurazioni	+ 31"
8	Wladimiro Panizza (ITA)	Scic	s.t.
9	Faustino Fernández Ovies (ESP)	Kas–Campagnolo	+ 33"
10	Felice Gimondi (ITA)	Bianchi–Campagnolo	s.t.

== Stage 5 ==
25 May 1977 — Pescara to Monteluco di Spoleto, 215 km (134 mi)

Stage 5 result

Rank	Rider	Team	Time
1	Mario Beccia (ITA)	Sanson	6h 15' 49"
2	Walter Riccomi (ITA)	Scic	+ 16"
3	Faustino Fernández Ovies (ESP)	Kas–Campagnolo	+ 22"
4	Tino Conti (ITA)	Zonca–Santini	+ 28"
5	José Viejo (ESP)	Kas–Campagnolo	+ 29"
6	Wladimiro Panizza (ITA)	Scic	s.t.
7	Alfio Vandi (ITA)	Magniflex–Torpado	s.t.
8	Johan De Muynck (BEL)	Brooklyn	+ 37"
9	Miguel María Lasa (ESP)	Teka	s.t.
10	Gianbattista Baronchelli (ITA)	Scic	s.t.

General classification after Stage 5

Rank	Rider	Team	Time
1	Francesco Moser (ITA)	Sanson	26h 58' 22"
2	Mario Beccia (ITA)	Sanson	+ 8"
3	Faustino Fernández Ovies (ESP)	Kas–Campagnolo	+ 12"
4	Walter Riccomi (ITA)	Scic	+ 16"
5	Freddy Maertens (BEL)	Flandria–Velda–Latina Assicurazioni	+ 17"
6	Wladimiro Panizza (ITA)	Scic	s.t.
7	Johan De Muynck (BEL)	Brooklyn	+ 18"
8	Gianbattista Baronchelli (ITA)	Scic	+ 22"
9	Miguel María Lasa (ESP)	Teka	+ 35"
10	José Viejo (ESP)	Kas–Campagnolo	+ 37"

== Stage 6a ==
26 May 1977 — Spoleto to Gabicce Mare, 185 km (115 mi)

Stage 6a result

Rank	Rider	Team	Time
1	Freddy Maertens (BEL)	Flandria–Velda–Latina Assicurazioni	4h 54' 14"
2	Miguel María Lasa (ESP)	Teka	s.t.
3	Enrico Paolini (ITA)	Scic	s.t.
4	Francesco Moser (ITA)	Sanson	s.t.
5	Rik Van Linden (BEL)	Bianchi–Campagnolo	s.t.
6	Pierino Gavazzi (ITA)	Jollj Ceramica	s.t.
7	Gianbattista Baronchelli (ITA)	Scic	s.t.
8	Wilmo Francioni (ITA)	Magniflex–Torpado	s.t.
9	Sebastián Pozo (ESP)	Kas–Campagnolo	s.t.
10	Michel Pollentier (BEL)	Flandria–Velda–Latina Assicurazioni	s.t.

General classification after Stage 6a

Rank	Rider	Team	Time
1	Francesco Moser (ITA)	Sanson	

== Stage 6b ==
26 May 1977 — Gabicce Mare to Gabicce Mare, 70 km (43 mi)

Stage 6b result

Rank	Rider	Team	Time
1	Freddy Maertens (BEL)	Flandria–Velda–Latina Assicurazioni	2h 08' 01"
2	Enrico Paolini (ITA)	Scic	+ 1"
3	Francesco Moser (ITA)	Sanson	s.t.
4	Rik Van Linden (BEL)	Bianchi–Campagnolo	s.t.
5	Michel Pollentier (BEL)	Flandria–Velda–Latina Assicurazioni	s.t.
6	Gianbattista Baronchelli (ITA)	Scic	s.t.
7	Pierino Gavazzi (ITA)	Jollj Ceramica	s.t.
8	Vittorio Algeri (ITA)	G.B.C.–Itla	s.t.
9	Bruno Vicino (ITA)	G.B.C.–Itla	s.t.
10	Mariano Martinez (FRA)	Flandria–Velda–Latina Assicurazioni	s.t.

General classification after Stage 6b

Rank	Rider	Team	Time
1	Francesco Moser (ITA)	Sanson	34h 00' 38"
2	Freddy Maertens (BEL)	Flandria–Velda–Latina Assicurazioni	+ 16"
3	Gianbattista Baronchelli (ITA)	Scic	+ 22"
4	Walter Riccomi (ITA)	Scic	+ 25"
5	Wladimiro Panizza (ITA)	Scic	+ 26"
6	Johan De Muynck (BEL)	Brooklyn	+ 27"
7	Mario Beccia (ITA)	Sanson	+ 31"
8	Faustino Fernández Ovies (ESP)	Kas–Campagnolo	+ 35"
9	José Viejo (ESP)	Kas–Campagnolo	+ 46"
10	Michel Pollentier (BEL)	Flandria–Velda–Latina Assicurazioni	+ 49"

== Stage 7 ==
27 May 1977 — Gabicce Mare to Forlì, 163 km (101 mi)

Stage 7 result

Rank	Rider	Team	Time
1	Freddy Maertens (BEL)	Flandria–Velda–Latina Assicurazioni	4h 43' 17"
2	Francesco Moser (ITA)	Sanson	s.t.
3	Wladimiro Panizza (ITA)	Scic	s.t.
4	Michel Pollentier (BEL)	Flandria–Velda–Latina Assicurazioni	s.t.
5	Gianbattista Baronchelli (ITA)	Scic	s.t.
6	Ronald De Witte (BEL)	Brooklyn	s.t.
7	Wilmo Francioni (ITA)	Magniflex–Torpado	+ 1' 11"
8	Felice Gimondi (ITA)	Bianchi–Campagnolo	s.t.
9	Carmello Barone (ITA)	Fiorella–Mocassini	s.t.
10	Miguel María Lasa (ESP)	Teka	s.t.

General classification after Stage 7

Rank	Rider	Team	Time
1	Francesco Moser (ITA)	Sanson	38h 43' 55"
2	Freddy Maertens (BEL)	Flandria–Velda–Latina Assicurazioni	+ 16"
3	Gianbattista Baronchelli (ITA)	Scic	+ 22"
4	Wladimiro Panizza (ITA)	Scic	+ 26"
5	Michel Pollentier (BEL)	Flandria–Velda–Latina Assicurazioni	+ 49"
6	Ronald De Witte (BEL)	Brooklyn	+ 1' 20"
7	Walter Riccomi (ITA)	Scic	+ 1' 36"
8	Johan De Muynck (BEL)	Brooklyn	+ 1' 38"
9	Mario Beccia (ITA)	Sanson	+ 1' 42"
10	José Viejo (ESP)	Kas–Campagnolo	+ 1' 57"

== Stage 8a ==
28 May 1977 — Forlì to Circuito del Mugello, 103 km (64 mi)

Stage 8a result

Rank	Rider	Team	Time
1	Freddy Maertens (BEL)	Flandria–Velda–Latina Assicurazioni	2h 51' 24"
2	Rik Van Linden (BEL)	Bianchi–Campagnolo	s.t.
3	Marcello Osler (ITA)	Brooklyn	s.t.
4	Miguel María Lasa (ESP)	Teka	s.t.
5	Marino Basso (ITA)	Selle Royal–Contour	s.t.
6	Willy De Geest (BEL)	Brooklyn	s.t.
7	Jesús Suárez Cueva (ESP)	Teka	s.t.
8	Luciano Borgognoni (ITA)	Vibor	s.t.
9	Angelo Tosoni (ITA)	G.B.C.–Itla	s.t.
10	Ignazio Paleari (ITA)	Fiorella–Mocassini	s.t.

General classification after Stage 8a

Rank	Rider	Team	Time
1	Francesco Moser (ITA)	Sanson	

== Stage 8b ==
28 May 1977 — Circuito del Mugello to Circuito del Mugello, 79 km (49 mi)

Stage 8b result

Rank	Rider	Team	Time
1	Marino Basso (ITA)	Selle Royal–Contour	1h 48' 56"
2	Pierino Gavazzi (ITA)	Jollj Ceramica	s.t.
3	Ercole Gualazzini (ITA)	Scic	s.t.
4	Ignazio Paleari (ITA)	Fiorella–Mocassini	s.t.
5	Luciano Borgognoni (ITA)	Vibor	s.t.
6	Enrique Martínez Heredia (ESP)	Kas–Campagnolo	s.t.
7	Marc Demeyer (BEL)	Flandria–Velda–Latina Assicurazioni	s.t.
8	Alessio Antonini (ITA)	Jollj Ceramica	s.t.
9	Jesús Suárez Cueva (ESP)	Teka	s.t.
10	Annunzio Colombo (ITA)	Zonca–Santini	s.t.

General classification after Stage 8b

Rank	Rider	Team	Time
1	Francesco Moser (ITA)	Sanson	43h 24' 15"
2	Freddy Maertens (BEL)	Flandria–Velda–Latina Assicurazioni	+ 16"
3	Gianbattista Baronchelli (ITA)	Scic	+ 22"
4	Wladimiro Panizza (ITA)	Scic	+ 26"
5	Michel Pollentier (BEL)	Flandria–Velda–Latina Assicurazioni	+ 49"
6	Ronald De Witte (BEL)	Brooklyn	+ 1' 20"
7	Walter Riccomi (ITA)	Scic	+ 1' 36"
8	Johan De Muynck (BEL)	Brooklyn	+ 1' 38"
9	Mario Beccia (ITA)	Sanson	+ 1' 42"
10	José Viejo (ESP)	Kas–Campagnolo	+ 1' 57"

== Stage 9 ==
29 May 1977 — Lucca to Pisa, 25 km (16 mi) (ITT)

Stage 9 result

Rank	Rider	Team	Time
1	Knut Knudsen (NOR)	Jollj Ceramica	30' 53"
2	Francesco Moser (ITA)	Sanson	+ 1' 04"
3	Luciano Borgognoni (ITA)	Vibor	+ 1' 10"
4	Michel Pollentier (BEL)	Flandria–Velda–Latina Assicurazioni	s.t.
5	Osvaldo Bettoni (ITA)	Scic	+ 1' 44"
6	Adriano Pella (ITA)	Selle Royal–Contour	+ 1' 47"
7	Antonio Bonini (ITA)	Fiorella–Mocassini	+ 1' 48"
8	Jørgen Marcussen (DEN)	Vibor	+ 1' 54"
9	Gianbattista Baronchelli (ITA)	Scic	+ 1' 56"
10	Marc Demeyer (BEL)	Flandria–Velda–Latina Assicurazioni	+ 1' 57"

General classification after Stage 9

Rank	Rider	Team	Time
1	Francesco Moser (ITA)	Sanson	43h 56' 12"
2	Michel Pollentier (BEL)	Flandria–Velda–Latina Assicurazioni	+ 55"
3	Gianbattista Baronchelli (ITA)	Scic	+ 1' 15"
4	Wladimiro Panizza (ITA)	Scic	+ 2' 16"
5	Ronald De Witte (BEL)	Brooklyn	+ 2' 42"
6	Johan De Muynck (BEL)	Brooklyn	+ 2' 56"
7	Felice Gimondi (ITA)	Bianchi–Campagnolo	+ 3' 08"
8	José Viejo (ESP)	Kas–Campagnolo	+ 4' 01"
9	Giancarlo Bellini (ITA)	Brooklyn	+ 4' 06"
10	Alfio Vandi (ITA)	Magniflex–Torpado	+ 4' 11"

== Stage 10 ==
30 May 1977 — Pisa to Salsomaggiore Terme, 205 km (127 mi)

Stage 10 result

Rank	Rider	Team	Time
1	Giacinto Santambrogio (ITA)	Bianchi–Campagnolo	5h 34' 06"
2	Pierino Gavazzi (ITA)	Jollj Ceramica	+ 1"
3	Francesco Moser (ITA)	Sanson	s.t.
4	Enrico Paolini (ITA)	Scic	s.t.
5	Luciano Borgognoni (ITA)	Vibor	s.t.
6	Marc Demeyer (BEL)	Flandria–Velda–Latina Assicurazioni	s.t.
7	Alessio Antonini (ITA)	Jollj Ceramica	s.t.
8	Miguel María Lasa (ESP)	Teka	s.t.
9	Wilmo Francioni (ITA)	Magniflex–Torpado	s.t.
10	Herman Van der Slagmolen (BEL)	Brooklyn	s.t.

General classification after Stage 10

Rank	Rider	Team	Time
1	Francesco Moser (ITA)	Sanson	49h 30' 39"
2	Michel Pollentier (BEL)	Flandria–Velda–Latina Assicurazioni	+ 55"
3	Gianbattista Baronchelli (ITA)	Scic	+ 1' 15"
4	Wladimiro Panizza (ITA)	Scic	+ 2' 16"
5	Ronald De Witte (BEL)	Brooklyn	+ 2' 42"
6	Johan De Muynck (BEL)	Brooklyn	+ 2' 56"
7	Felice Gimondi (ITA)	Bianchi–Campagnolo	+ 3' 08"
8	José Viejo (ESP)	Kas–Campagnolo	+ 4' 01"
9	Giancarlo Bellini (ITA)	Brooklyn	+ 4' 06"
10	Alfio Vandi (ITA)	Magniflex–Torpado	+ 4' 11"
