= 1978 Giro d'Italia, Stage 11a to Stage 20 =

Cycling race stages

The 1978 Giro d'Italia was the 61st edition of the Giro d'Italia, one of cycling's Grand Tours. The Giro began with a prologue individual time trial in Saint-Vincent on 7 May, and Stage 11a occurred on 18 May with a flat stage from Terni. The race finished in Milan on 28 May.

== Stage 11a ==
18 May 1978 — Terni to Assisi, 74 km (46 mi)

Stage 11a result

Rank	Rider	Team	Time
1	Bruno Zanoni (ITA)	Mecap–Selle Italia	1h 45' 26"
2	Roberto Visentini (ITA)	Vibor	s.t.
3	Ottavio Crepaldi (ITA)	Magniflex–Torpado	+ 7"
4	Francisco Javier Cedena (ESP)	Teka	+ 10"
5	Bruno Wolfer (SUI)	Zonca–Santini	+ 12"
6	Giuseppe Saronni (ITA)	Scic–Bottecchia	s.t.
7	Roger De Vlaeminck (BEL)	Sanson–Campagnolo	s.t.
8	Rudy Pevenage (BEL)	IJsboerke–Gios	s.t.
9	Giuseppe Martinelli (ITA)	Magniflex–Torpado	s.t.
10	Pierino Gavazzi (ITA)	Zonca–Santini	s.t.

General classification after Stage 11a

Rank	Rider	Team	Time
1	Johan De Muynck (BEL)	Bianchi–Faema	

== Stage 11b ==
18 May 1978 — Assisi to Siena, 145 km (90 mi)

Stage 11b result

Rank	Rider	Team	Time
1	Francesco Moser (ITA)	Sanson–Campagnolo	3h 48' 54"
2	Pierino Gavazzi (ITA)	Zonca–Santini	+ 3"
3	Roger De Vlaeminck (BEL)	Sanson–Campagnolo	s.t.
4	Rudy Pevenage (BEL)	IJsboerke–Gios	s.t.
5	Alfons De Bal (BEL)	IJsboerke–Gios	s.t.
6	Gianbattista Baronchelli (ITA)	Scic–Bottecchia	s.t.
7	Josef Fuchs (SUI)	Fiorella–Citroen	s.t.
8	Alfredo Chinetti (ITA)	Selle Royal–Inoxpran	s.t.
9	Sergio Santimaria (ITA)	Mecap–Selle Italia	s.t.
10	Marino Basso (ITA)	Gis Gelati	s.t.

General classification after Stage 11b

Rank	Rider	Team	Time
1	Johan De Muynck (BEL)	Bianchi–Faema	57h 27' 37"
2	Wladimiro Panizza (ITA)	Vibor	+ 34"
3	Giovanni Battaglin (ITA)	Fiorella–Citroen	+ 1' 21"
4	Gianbattista Baronchelli (ITA)	Scic–Bottecchia	+ 1' 30"
5	Francesco Moser (ITA)	Sanson–Campagnolo	+ 2' 02"
6	Giuseppe Saronni (ITA)	Scic–Bottecchia	+ 2' 16"
7	Ronald De Witte (BEL)	Sanson–Campagnolo	+ 2' 41"
8	Roberto Visentini (ITA)	Vibor	+ 2' 48"
9	Bernt Johansson (SWE)	Fiorella–Citroen	+ 3' 27"
10	Roger De Vlaeminck (BEL)	Sanson–Campagnolo	+ 3' 28"

== Stage 12 ==
19 May 1978 — Poggibonsi to Monte Trebbio, 204 km (127 mi)

Stage 12 result

Rank	Rider	Team	Time
1	Giancarlo Bellini (ITA)	Zonca–Santini	6h 22' 13"
2	Claudio Bortolotto (ITA)	Sanson–Campagnolo	+ 8"
3	Alfredo Chinetti (ITA)	Selle Royal–Inoxpran	+ 10"
4	Ottavio Crepaldi (ITA)	Magniflex–Torpado	+ 22"
5	Felice Gimondi (ITA)	Bianchi–Faema	+ 35"
6	Fabrizio Fabbri (ITA)	Sanson–Campagnolo	+ 41"
7	Rudy Pevenage (BEL)	IJsboerke–Gios	+ 1' 07"
8	Giuseppe Saronni (ITA)	Scic–Bottecchia	+ 1' 09"
9	Wladimiro Panizza (ITA)	Vibor	+ 1' 12"
10	Johan De Muynck (BEL)	Bianchi–Faema	s.t.

General classification after Stage 12

Rank	Rider	Team	Time
1	Johan De Muynck (BEL)	Bianchi–Faema	63h 51' 02"
2	Wladimiro Panizza (ITA)	Vibor	+ 34"
3	Giovanni Battaglin (ITA)	Fiorella–Citroen	+ 1' 21"
4	Gianbattista Baronchelli (ITA)	Scic–Bottecchia	+ 1' 30"
5	Francesco Moser (ITA)	Sanson–Campagnolo	+ 2' 07"
6	Giuseppe Saronni (ITA)	Scic–Bottecchia	+ 2' 12"
7	Ronald De Witte (BEL)	Sanson–Campagnolo	+ 2' 54"
8	Roberto Visentini (ITA)	Vibor	+ 3' 04"
9	Bernt Johansson (SWE)	Fiorella–Citroen	+ 3' 52"
10	Alfio Vandi (ITA)	Magniflex–Torpado	+ 3' 53"

== Stage 13 ==
20 May 1978 — Modigliana to Padua, 183 km (114 mi)

Stage 13 result

Rank	Rider	Team	Time
1	Francesco Moser (ITA)	Sanson–Campagnolo	4h 45' 20"
2	Pierino Gavazzi (ITA)	Zonca–Santini	s.t.
3	Luciano Borgognoni (ITA)	Vibor	s.t.
4	Giuseppe Martinelli (ITA)	Magniflex–Torpado	s.t.
5	Fiorenzo Favero (ITA)	Intercontinentale Assicurazioni	s.t.
6	Alfons De Bal (BEL)	IJsboerke–Gios	s.t.
7	Claudio Torelli (ITA)	Zonca–Santini	s.t.
8	Rudy Pevenage (BEL)	IJsboerke–Gios	s.t.
9	Marino Basso (ITA)	Gis Gelati	s.t.
10	Giancarlo Tartoni (ITA)	Magniflex–Torpado	s.t.

General classification after Stage 13

Rank	Rider	Team	Time
1	Johan De Muynck (BEL)	Bianchi–Faema	68h 36' 22"
2	Wladimiro Panizza (ITA)	Vibor	+ 34"
3	Giovanni Battaglin (ITA)	Fiorella–Citroen	+ 1' 21"
4	Gianbattista Baronchelli (ITA)	Scic–Bottecchia	+ 1' 30"
5	Francesco Moser (ITA)	Sanson–Campagnolo	+ 2' 07"
6	Giuseppe Saronni (ITA)	Scic–Bottecchia	+ 2' 13"
7	Ronald De Witte (BEL)	Sanson–Campagnolo	+ 2' 54"
8	Roberto Visentini (ITA)	Vibor	+ 3' 04"
9	Bernt Johansson (SWE)	Fiorella–Citroen	+ 3' 52"
10	Alfio Vandi (ITA)	Magniflex–Torpado	+ 3' 53"

== Stage 14 ==
21 May 1978 — Venezia to Venezia, 12 km (7.5 mi) (ITT)

Stage 14 result

Rank	Rider	Team	Time
1	Francesco Moser (ITA)	Sanson–Campagnolo	16' 11"
2	Roberto Visentini (ITA)	Vibor	+ 6"
3	Giuseppe Saronni (ITA)	Scic–Bottecchia	+ 14"
4	Knut Knudsen (NOR)	Bianchi–Faema	+ 15"
5	Johan De Muynck (BEL)	Bianchi–Faema	+ 22"
6	Gianbattista Baronchelli (ITA)	Scic–Bottecchia	+ 25"
7	Roy Schuiten (NED)	Scic–Bottecchia	+ 30"
8	Simone Fraccaro (ITA)	Sanson–Campagnolo	+ 33"
9	Ueli Sutter (SUI)	Zonca–Santini	+ 37"
10	Alfio Vandi (ITA)	Magniflex–Torpado	+ 38"

General classification after Stage 14

Rank	Rider	Team	Time
1	Johan De Muynck (BEL)	Bianchi–Faema	68h 52' 25"
2	Wladimiro Panizza (ITA)	Vibor	+ 1' 03"
3	Gianbattista Baronchelli (ITA)	Scic–Bottecchia	+ 1' 33"
4	Francesco Moser (ITA)	Sanson–Campagnolo	+ 1' 45"
5	Giovanni Battaglin (ITA)	Fiorella–Citroen	+ 2' 01"
6	Giuseppe Saronni (ITA)	Scic–Bottecchia	+ 2' 05"
7	Roberto Visentini (ITA)	Vibor	+ 2' 48"
8	Ronald De Witte (BEL)	Sanson–Campagnolo	+ 3' 32"
9	Alfio Vandi (ITA)	Magniflex–Torpado	+ 4' 09"
10	Bernt Johansson (SWE)	Fiorella–Citroen	s.t.

== Rest day ==
22 May 1978

== Stage 15 ==
23 May 1978 — Treviso to Canazei, 234 km (145 mi)

Stage 15 result

Rank	Rider	Team	Time
1	Gianbattista Baronchelli (ITA)	Scic–Bottecchia	7h 34' 30"
2	Alfio Vandi (ITA)	Magniflex–Torpado	s.t.
3	Johan De Muynck (BEL)	Bianchi–Faema	s.t.
4	Francesco Moser (ITA)	Sanson–Campagnolo	+ 1' 09"
5	Claudio Bortolotto (ITA)	Sanson–Campagnolo	+ 2' 14"
6	Ronald De Witte (BEL)	Sanson–Campagnolo	s.t.
7	Bernt Johansson (SWE)	Fiorella–Citroen	+ 4' 41"
8	Felice Gimondi (ITA)	Bianchi–Faema	+ 5' 11"
9	Alfredo Chinetti (ITA)	Selle Royal–Inoxpran	s.t.
10	Giuseppe Saronni (ITA)	Scic–Bottecchia	s.t.

General classification after Stage 15

Rank	Rider	Team	Time
1	Johan De Muynck (BEL)	Bianchi–Faema	76h 27' 25"
2	Gianbattista Baronchelli (ITA)	Scic–Bottecchia	+ 1' 33"
3	Francesco Moser (ITA)	Sanson–Campagnolo	+ 2' 54"
4	Alfio Vandi (ITA)	Magniflex–Torpado	+ 4' 09"
5	Ronald De Witte (BEL)	Sanson–Campagnolo	+ 5' 46"
6	Wladimiro Panizza (ITA)	Vibor	+ 6' 14"
7	Claudio Bortolotto (ITA)	Sanson–Campagnolo	+ 6' 58"
8	Giuseppe Saronni (ITA)	Scic–Bottecchia	+ 7' 16"
9	Bernt Johansson (SWE)	Fiorella–Citroen	+ 8' 50"
10	Ueli Sutter (SUI)	Zonca–Santini	+ 9' 25"

== Stage 16 ==
24 May 1978 — Mazzin to Cavalese, 48 km (30 mi) (ITT)

Stage 16 result

Rank	Rider	Team	Time
1	Francesco Moser (ITA)	Sanson–Campagnolo	57' 57"
2	Knut Knudsen (NOR)	Bianchi–Faema	+ 1' 15"
3	Felice Gimondi (ITA)	Bianchi–Faema	+ 1' 37"
4	Gianbattista Baronchelli (ITA)	Scic–Bottecchia	+ 1' 42"
5	Giuseppe Saronni (ITA)	Scic–Bottecchia	+ 2' 12"
6	Bernt Johansson (SWE)	Fiorella–Citroen	+ 2' 17"
7	Johan De Muynck (BEL)	Bianchi–Faema	+ 2' 18"
8	Roy Schuiten (NED)	Scic–Bottecchia	+ 2' 19"
9	Ronald De Witte (BEL)	Sanson–Campagnolo	+ 3' 01"
10	Roberto Visentini (ITA)	Vibor	+ 3' 12"

General classification after Stage 16

Rank	Rider	Team	Time
1	Johan De Muynck (BEL)	Bianchi–Faema	77h 27' 40"
2	Francesco Moser (ITA)	Sanson–Campagnolo	+ 45"
3	Gianbattista Baronchelli (ITA)	Scic–Bottecchia	+ 52"
4	Alfio Vandi (ITA)	Magniflex–Torpado	+ 6' 11"
5	Ronald De Witte (BEL)	Sanson–Campagnolo	+ 6' 29"
6	Giuseppe Saronni (ITA)	Scic–Bottecchia	+ 7' 10"
7	Claudio Bortolotto (ITA)	Sanson–Campagnolo	+ 8' 19"
8	Bernt Johansson (SWE)	Fiorella–Citroen	+ 8' 49"
9	Wladimiro Panizza (ITA)	Vibor	+ 9' 00"
10	Ueli Sutter (SUI)	Zonca–Santini	+ 11' 43"

== Stage 17 ==
25 May 1978 — Cavalese to Monte Bondone, 205 km (127 mi)

Stage 17 result

Rank	Rider	Team	Time
1	Wladimiro Panizza (ITA)	Vibor	5h 41' 49"
2	Roberto Visentini (ITA)	Vibor	+ 1' 01"
3	Felice Gimondi (ITA)	Bianchi–Faema	+ 1' 03"
4	Fausto Bertoglio (ITA)	Selle Royal–Inoxpran	s.t.
5	Johan De Muynck (BEL)	Bianchi–Faema	s.t.
6	Gianbattista Baronchelli (ITA)	Scic–Bottecchia	+ 1' 05"
7	Giancarlo Bellini (ITA)	Zonca–Santini	+ 1' 17"
8	Giuseppe Saronni (ITA)	Scic–Bottecchia	+ 1' 57"
9	Ueli Sutter (SUI)	Zonca–Santini	+ 1' 58"
10	Alfredo Chinetti (ITA)	Selle Royal–Inoxpran	s.t.

General classification after Stage 17

Rank	Rider	Team	Time
1	Johan De Muynck (BEL)	Bianchi–Faema	83h 10' 32"
2	Gianbattista Baronchelli (ITA)	Scic–Bottecchia	+ 59"
3	Francesco Moser (ITA)	Sanson–Campagnolo	+ 2' 19"
4	Wladimiro Panizza (ITA)	Vibor	+ 7' 57"
5	Giuseppe Saronni (ITA)	Scic–Bottecchia	+ 8' 04"
6	Ronald De Witte (BEL)	Sanson–Campagnolo	+ 8' 24"
7	Alfio Vandi (ITA)	Magniflex–Torpado	+ 9' 04"
8	Claudio Bortolotto (ITA)	Sanson–Campagnolo	+ 9' 25"
9	Bernt Johansson (SWE)	Fiorella–Citroen	+ 12' 36"
10	Ueli Sutter (SUI)	Zonca–Santini	+ 12' 38"

== Stage 18 ==
26 May 1978 — Mezzolombardo to Sarezzo, 245 km (152 mi)

Stage 18 result

Rank	Rider	Team	Time
1	Giuseppe Perletto (ITA)	Magniflex–Torpado	7h 28' 49"
2	Pierino Gavazzi (ITA)	Zonca–Santini	+ 18"
3	Francesco Moser (ITA)	Sanson–Campagnolo	s.t.
4	Alfredo Chinetti (ITA)	Selle Royal–Inoxpran	s.t.
5	Bernt Johansson (SWE)	Fiorella–Citroen	s.t.
6	Ronald De Witte (BEL)	Sanson–Campagnolo	s.t.
7	Felice Gimondi (ITA)	Bianchi–Faema	s.t.
8	Gianbattista Baronchelli (ITA)	Scic–Bottecchia	s.t.
9	Bruno Wolfer (SUI)	Zonca–Santini	s.t.
10	Alfio Vandi (ITA)	Magniflex–Torpado	s.t.

General classification after Stage 18

Rank	Rider	Team	Time
1	Johan De Muynck (BEL)	Bianchi–Faema	90h 39' 39"
2	Gianbattista Baronchelli (ITA)	Scic–Bottecchia	+ 59"
3	Francesco Moser (ITA)	Sanson–Campagnolo	+ 2' 19"
4	Wladimiro Panizza (ITA)	Vibor	+ 7' 57"
5	Giuseppe Saronni (ITA)	Scic–Bottecchia	+ 8' 04"
6	Ronald De Witte (BEL)	Sanson–Campagnolo	+ 8' 24"
7	Alfio Vandi (ITA)	Magniflex–Torpado	+ 9' 04"
8	Claudio Bortolotto (ITA)	Sanson–Campagnolo	+ 9' 25"
9	Bernt Johansson (SWE)	Fiorella–Citroen	+ 12' 36"
10	Ueli Sutter (SUI)	Zonca–Santini	+ 12' 38"

== Stage 19 ==
27 May 1978 — Brescia to Inverigo, 175 km (109 mi)

Stage 19 result

Rank	Rider	Team	Time
1	Vittorio Algeri (ITA)	Intercontinentale Assicurazioni	5h 11' 00"
2	Giuseppe Martinelli (ITA)	Magniflex–Torpado	+ 2"
3	Vicenzo De Caro (ITA)	Mecap–Selle Italia	s.t.
4	Pierino Gavazzi (ITA)	Zonca–Santini	s.t.
5	Giuseppe Saronni (ITA)	Scic–Bottecchia	s.t.
6	Willy De Geest (BEL)	Sanson–Campagnolo	s.t.
7	Francesco Moser (ITA)	Sanson–Campagnolo	s.t.
8	Carlo Zoni (ITA)	Gis Gelati	s.t.
9	Gabriele Landoni (ITA)	Zonca–Santini	s.t.
10	Carmelo Barone (ITA)	Fiorella–Citroen	s.t.

General classification after Stage 19

Rank	Rider	Team	Time
1	Johan De Muynck (BEL)	Bianchi–Faema	95h 50' 41"
2	Gianbattista Baronchelli (ITA)	Scic–Bottecchia	+ 59"
3	Francesco Moser (ITA)	Sanson–Campagnolo	+ 2' 19"
4	Wladimiro Panizza (ITA)	Vibor	+ 7' 57"
5	Giuseppe Saronni (ITA)	Scic–Bottecchia	+ 8' 19"
6	Ronald De Witte (BEL)	Sanson–Campagnolo	+ 8' 24"
7	Alfio Vandi (ITA)	Magniflex–Torpado	+ 9' 04"
8	Claudio Bortolotto (ITA)	Sanson–Campagnolo	+ 9' 25"
9	Bernt Johansson (SWE)	Fiorella–Citroen	+ 12' 36"
10	Ueli Sutter (SUI)	Zonca–Santini	+ 12' 38"

== Stage 20 ==
28 May 1978 — Inverigo to Milan, 220 km (140 mi)

Stage 20 result

Rank	Rider	Team	Time
1	Pierino Gavazzi (ITA)	Zonca–Santini	5h 40' 41"
2	Giuseppe Martinelli (ITA)	Magniflex–Torpado	s.t.
3	Giuseppe Saronni (ITA)	Scic–Bottecchia	s.t.
4	Fiorenzo Favero (ITA)	Intercontinentale Assicurazioni	s.t.
5	Alfredo Chinetti (ITA)	Selle Royal–Inoxpran	s.t.
6	Angelo Tosoni (ITA)	Mecap–Selle Italia	s.t.
7	Luciano Borgognoni (ITA)	Vibor	s.t.
8	Luciano Rossignoli (ITA)	Fiorella–Citroen	s.t.
9	Jürgen Kraft (FRG)	Teka	s.t.
10	Paolo Rosola (ITA)	Intercontinentale Assicurazioni	s.t.

General classification after Stage 20

Rank	Rider	Team	Time
1	Johan De Muynck (BEL)	Bianchi–Faema	101h 31' 22"
2	Gianbattista Baronchelli (ITA)	Scic–Bottecchia	+ 59"
3	Francesco Moser (ITA)	Sanson–Campagnolo	+ 2' 19"
4	Wladimiro Panizza (ITA)	Vibor	+ 7' 57"
5	Giuseppe Saronni (ITA)	Scic–Bottecchia	+ 8' 19"
6	Ronald De Witte (BEL)	Sanson–Campagnolo	+ 8' 24"
7	Alfio Vandi (ITA)	Magniflex–Torpado	+ 9' 04"
8	Claudio Bortolotto (ITA)	Sanson–Campagnolo	+ 9' 25"
9	Bernt Johansson (SWE)	Fiorella–Citroen	+ 12' 36"
10	Ueli Sutter (SUI)	Zonca–Santini	+ 12' 38"
