= 1978 Giro d'Italia, Prologue to Stage 10 =

Cycling race stages

The 1978 Giro d'Italia was the 61st edition of the Giro d'Italia, one of cycling's Grand Tours. The Giro began with a prologue individual time trial in Saint-Vincent on 7 May, and Stage 10 occurred on 17 May with a mountainous stage to Lago di Piediluco. The race finished in Milan on 28 May.

== Prologue ==
7 May 1978 — Saint-Vincent, 2 km (1.2 mi) (ITT)

Prologue result

Rank	Rider	Team	Time
1	Dietrich Thurau (FRG)	IJsboerke–Gios	3' 14"
2	Francesco Moser (ITA)	Sanson–Campagnolo	s.t.
3	Giuseppe Saronni (ITA)	Scic–Bottecchia	+ 3"
4	Roberto Visentini (ITA)	Vibor	+ 4"
5	Vittorio Algeri (ITA)	Intercontinentale Assicurazioni	s.t.
6	Bruce Santeroni (ITA)	Gis Gelati	s.t.
7	Pedro Vilardebo (ESP)	Teka	+ 5"
8	Miguel María Lasa (ESP)	Teka	+ 6"
9	Eric Van De Wiele (BEL)	IJsboerke–Gios	s.t.
10	Carmelo Barone (ITA)	Fiorella–Citroen	+ 7"

== Stage 1 ==
8 May 1978 — Saint-Vincent to Novi Ligure, 175 km (109 mi)

Stage 1 result

Rank	Rider	Team	Time
1	Rik Van Linden (BEL)	Bianchi–Faema	4h 23' 58"
2	Dietrich Thurau (FRG)	IJsboerke–Gios	s.t.
3	Alfons De Bal (BEL)	IJsboerke–Gios	s.t.
4	Marino Basso (ITA)	Gis Gelati	s.t.
5	Luciano Borgognoni (ITA)	Vibor	s.t.
6	Giuseppe Saronni (ITA)	Scic–Bottecchia	s.t.
7	Roger De Vlaeminck (BEL)	Sanson–Campagnolo	s.t.
8	Pierino Gavazzi (ITA)	Zonca–Santini	s.t.
9	Dino Porrini (ITA)	Mecap–Selle Italia	s.t.
10	Alessio Antonini (ITA)	Selle Royal–Inoxpran	s.t.

General classification after Stage 1

Rank	Rider	Team	Time
1	Rik Van Linden (BEL)	Bianchi–Faema	

== Stage 2 ==
9 May 1978 — Novi Ligure to La Spezia, 195 km (121 mi)

Stage 2 result

Rank	Rider	Team	Time
1	Giuseppe Saronni (ITA)	Scic–Bottecchia	5h 03' 38"
2	Rik Van Linden (BEL)	Bianchi–Faema	s.t.
3	Francesco Moser (ITA)	Sanson–Campagnolo	s.t.
4	Carmelo Barone (ITA)	Fiorella–Citroen	s.t.
5	Alfons De Bal (BEL)	IJsboerke–Gios	s.t.
6	Roger De Vlaeminck (BEL)	Sanson–Campagnolo	s.t.
7	Marino Basso (ITA)	Gis Gelati	s.t.
8	Dietrich Thurau (FRG)	IJsboerke–Gios	s.t.
9	Carlo Zoni (ITA)	Selle Royal–Inoxpran	s.t.
10	Luciano Borgognoni (ITA)	Vibor	s.t.

General classification after Stage 2

Rank	Rider	Team	Time
1	Rik Van Linden (BEL)	Bianchi–Faema	9h 27' 56"
2	Giuseppe Saronni (ITA)	Scic–Bottecchia	s.t.
3	Alfons De Bal (BEL)	IJsboerke–Gios	s.t.
4	Dietrich Thurau (FRG)	IJsboerke–Gios	s.t.
5	Marino Basso (ITA)	Gis Gelati	s.t.
6	Roger De Vlaeminck (BEL)	Sanson–Campagnolo	s.t.
7	Carmelo Barone (ITA)	Fiorella–Citroen	s.t.
8	Luciano Borgognoni (ITA)	Vibor	s.t.
9	Francesco Moser (ITA)	Sanson–Campagnolo	s.t.
10	Alessio Antonini (ITA)	Selle Royal–Inoxpran	s.t.

== Stage 3 ==
10 May 1978 — La Spezia to Càscina, 183 km (114 mi)

Stage 3 result

Rank	Rider	Team	Time
1	Johan De Muynck (BEL)	Bianchi–Faema	5h 13' 39"
2	Francesco Moser (ITA)	Sanson–Campagnolo	+ 52"
3	Alfredo Chinetti (ITA)	Selle Royal–Inoxpran	s.t.
4	Roger De Vlaeminck (BEL)	Sanson–Campagnolo	s.t.
5	Carlo Zoni (ITA)	Selle Royal–Inoxpran	s.t.
6	Ludo Peeters (BEL)	IJsboerke–Gios	s.t.
7	Giuseppe Saronni (ITA)	Scic–Bottecchia	s.t.
8	Gabriele Landoni (ITA)	Zonca–Santini	s.t.
9	Gianbattista Baronchelli (ITA)	Scic–Bottecchia	s.t.
10	Ottavio Crepaldi (ITA)	Magniflex–Torpado	s.t.

General classification after Stage 3

Rank	Rider	Team	Time
1	Johan De Muynck (BEL)	Bianchi–Faema	14h 41' 35"
2	Giuseppe Saronni (ITA)	Scic–Bottecchia	+ 52"
3	Roger De Vlaeminck (BEL)	Sanson–Campagnolo	s.t.
4	Francesco Moser (ITA)	Sanson–Campagnolo	s.t.
5	Dietrich Thurau (FRG)	IJsboerke–Gios	s.t.
6	Alfredo Chinetti (ITA)	Selle Royal–Inoxpran	s.t.
7	Vittorio Algeri (ITA)	Intercontinentale Assicurazioni	s.t.
8	Alfio Vandi (ITA)	Magniflex–Torpado	s.t.
9	Ottavio Crepaldi (ITA)	Magniflex–Torpado	s.t.
10	Gianbattista Baronchelli (ITA)	Scic–Bottecchia	s.t.

== Stage 4 ==
11 May 1978 — Larciano to Pistoia, 25 km (16 mi) (ITT)

Stage 4 result

Rank	Rider	Team	Time
1	Dietrich Thurau (FRG)	IJsboerke–Gios	31' 28"
2	Francesco Moser (ITA)	Sanson–Campagnolo	+ 7"
3	Knut Knudsen (NOR)	Bianchi–Faema	+ 10"
4	Roger De Vlaeminck (BEL)	Sanson–Campagnolo	+ 25"
5	Giuseppe Saronni (ITA)	Scic–Bottecchia	+ 37"
6	Johan De Muynck (BEL)	Bianchi–Faema	+ 44"
7	Roberto Visentini (ITA)	Vibor	+ 49"
8	Fausto Bertoglio (ITA)	Selle Royal–Inoxpran	+ 58"
9	Roy Schuiten (NED)	Scic–Bottecchia	+ 1' 08"
10	Giovanni Battaglin (ITA)	Fiorella–Citroen	+ 1' 13"

General classification after Stage 4

Rank	Rider	Team	Time
1	Johan De Muynck (BEL)	Bianchi–Faema	15h 13' 47"
2	Dietrich Thurau (FRG)	IJsboerke–Gios	+ 8"
3	Francesco Moser (ITA)	Sanson–Campagnolo	+ 15"
4	Knut Knudsen (NOR)	Bianchi–Faema	+ 18"
5	Roger De Vlaeminck (BEL)	Sanson–Campagnolo	+ 20"
6	Giuseppe Saronni (ITA)	Scic–Bottecchia	+ 45"
7	Roberto Visentini (ITA)	Vibor	+ 57"
8	Fausto Bertoglio (ITA)	Selle Royal–Inoxpran	+ 1' 17"
9	Giovanni Battaglin (ITA)	Fiorella–Citroen	+ 1' 21"
10	Bernt Johansson (SWE)	Fiorella–Citroen	+ 1' 26"

== Stage 5 ==
12 May 1978 — Prato to Cattolica, 200 km (120 mi)

Stage 5 result

Rank	Rider	Team	Time
1	Rik Van Linden (BEL)	Bianchi–Faema	5h 51' 04"
2	Francesco Moser (ITA)	Sanson–Campagnolo	s.t.
3	Marino Basso (ITA)	Gis Gelati	s.t.
4	Roger De Vlaeminck (BEL)	Sanson–Campagnolo	s.t.
5	Alfons De Bal (BEL)	IJsboerke–Gios	s.t.
6	Enrico Paolini (ITA)	Scic–Bottecchia	s.t.
7	Pierino Gavazzi (ITA)	Zonca–Santini	s.t.
8	Miguel María Lasa (ESP)	Teka	s.t.
9	Dino Porrini (ITA)	Mecap–Selle Italia	s.t.
10	Giuseppe Martinelli (ITA)	Magniflex–Torpado	s.t.

General classification after Stage 5

Rank	Rider	Team	Time
1	Johan De Muynck (BEL)	Bianchi–Faema	21h 04' 51"
2	Dietrich Thurau (FRG)	IJsboerke–Gios	+ 8"
3	Francesco Moser (ITA)	Sanson–Campagnolo	+ 15"
4	Knut Knudsen (NOR)	Bianchi–Faema	+ 18"
5	Roger De Vlaeminck (BEL)	Sanson–Campagnolo	+ 33"
6	Giuseppe Saronni (ITA)	Scic–Bottecchia	+ 41"
7	Roberto Visentini (ITA)	Vibor	+ 53"
8	Fausto Bertoglio (ITA)	Selle Royal–Inoxpran	+ 1' 03"
9	Giovanni Battaglin (ITA)	Fiorella–Citroen	+ 1' 17"
10	Bernt Johansson (SWE)	Fiorella–Citroen	+ 1' 22"

== Stage 6 ==
13 May 1978 — Cattolica to Silvi Marina, 218 km (135 mi)

Stage 6 result

Rank	Rider	Team	Time
1	Rik Van Linden (BEL)	Bianchi–Faema	5h 41' 47"
2	Roger De Vlaeminck (BEL)	Sanson–Campagnolo	s.t.
3	Alfons De Bal (BEL)	IJsboerke–Gios	s.t.
4	Marino Basso (ITA)	Gis Gelati	s.t.
5	Pietro Algeri (ITA)	Intercontinentale Assicurazioni	s.t.
6	Pierino Gavazzi (ITA)	Zonca–Santini	s.t.
7	Guido Van Sweevelt (BEL)	IJsboerke–Gios	s.t.
8	Franco Bitossi (ITA)	Gis Gelati	s.t.
9	Palmiro Masciarelli (ITA)	Sanson–Campagnolo	s.t.
10	Alessio Antonini (ITA)	Selle Royal–Inoxpran	s.t.

General classification after Stage 6

Rank	Rider	Team	Time
1	Johan De Muynck (BEL)	Bianchi–Faema	26h 46' 38"
2	Dietrich Thurau (FRG)	IJsboerke–Gios	+ 8"
3	Francesco Moser (ITA)	Sanson–Campagnolo	+ 15"
4	Knut Knudsen (NOR)	Bianchi–Faema	+ 18"
5	Roger De Vlaeminck (BEL)	Sanson–Campagnolo	+ 33"
6	Giuseppe Saronni (ITA)	Scic–Bottecchia	+ 45"
7	Roberto Visentini (ITA)	Vibor	+ 57"
8	Fausto Bertoglio (ITA)	Selle Royal–Inoxpran	+ 1' 07"
9	Giovanni Battaglin (ITA)	Fiorella–Citroen	+ 1' 21"
10	Bernt Johansson (SWE)	Fiorella–Citroen	+ 1' 26"

== Stage 7 ==
14 May 1978 — Silvi Marina to Benevento, 242 km (150 mi)

Stage 7 result

Rank	Rider	Team	Time
1	Giuseppe Saronni (ITA)	Scic–Bottecchia	6h 36' 56"
2	Roger De Vlaeminck (BEL)	Sanson–Campagnolo	s.t.
3	Francesco Moser (ITA)	Sanson–Campagnolo	s.t.
4	Gianbattista Baronchelli (ITA)	Scic–Bottecchia	s.t.
5	Pedro Torres (ESP)	Teka	s.t.
6	Alfio Vandi (ITA)	Magniflex–Torpado	s.t.
7	Bernt Johansson (SWE)	Fiorella–Citroen	s.t.
8	Knut Knudsen (NOR)	Bianchi–Faema	s.t.
9	Wladimiro Panizza (ITA)	Vibor	s.t.
10	Giovanni Battaglin (ITA)	Fiorella–Citroen	s.t.

General classification after Stage 7

Rank	Rider	Team	Time
1	Johan De Muynck (BEL)	Bianchi–Faema	33h 23' 34"
2	Francesco Moser (ITA)	Sanson–Campagnolo	+ 15"
3	Knut Knudsen (NOR)	Bianchi–Faema	+ 18"
4	Roger De Vlaeminck (BEL)	Sanson–Campagnolo	+ 33"
5	Giuseppe Saronni (ITA)	Scic–Bottecchia	+ 45"
6	Roberto Visentini (ITA)	Vibor	+ 57"
7	Giovanni Battaglin (ITA)	Fiorella–Citroen	+ 1' 21"
8	Bernt Johansson (SWE)	Fiorella–Citroen	+ 1' 26"
9	Gianbattista Baronchelli (ITA)	Scic–Bottecchia	+ 1' 30"
10	Ueli Sutter (SUI)	Zonca–Santini	s.t.

== Stage 8 ==
15 May 1978 — Benevento to Ravello, 175 km (109 mi)

Stage 8 result

Rank	Rider	Team	Time
1	Giuseppe Saronni (ITA)	Scic–Bottecchia	5h 10' 20"
2	Gianbattista Baronchelli (ITA)	Scic–Bottecchia	s.t.
3	Alfio Vandi (ITA)	Magniflex–Torpado	s.t.
4	Pedro Torres (ESP)	Teka	s.t.
5	Wladimiro Panizza (ITA)	Vibor	s.t.
6	Johan De Muynck (BEL)	Bianchi–Faema	s.t.
7	Giovanni Battaglin (ITA)	Fiorella–Citroen	s.t.
8	Francesco Moser (ITA)	Sanson–Campagnolo	s.t.
9	Fausto Bertoglio (ITA)	Selle Royal–Inoxpran	s.t.
10	Ronald De Witte (BEL)	Sanson–Campagnolo	+ 26"

General classification after Stage 8

Rank	Rider	Team	Time
1	Johan De Muynck (BEL)	Bianchi–Faema	38h 34' 13"
2	Francesco Moser (ITA)	Sanson–Campagnolo	+ 15"
3	Giuseppe Saronni (ITA)	Scic–Bottecchia	+ 26"
4	Roberto Visentini (ITA)	Vibor	+ 1' 08"
5	Giovanni Battaglin (ITA)	Fiorella–Citroen	+ 1' 30"
6	Gianbattista Baronchelli (ITA)	Scic–Bottecchia	s.t.
7	Bernt Johansson (SWE)	Fiorella–Citroen	+ 1' 37"
8	Roger De Vlaeminck (BEL)	Sanson–Campagnolo	+ 1' 38"
9	Wladimiro Panizza (ITA)	Vibor	+ 1' 45"
10	Knut Knudsen (NOR)	Bianchi–Faema	+ 1' 49"

== Stage 9 ==
16 May 1978 — Amalfi to Latina, 248 km (154 mi)

Stage 9 result

Rank	Rider	Team	Time
1	Enrico Paolini (ITA)	Scic–Bottecchia	7h 01' 51"
2	Phil Edwards (GBR)	Sanson–Campagnolo	s.t.
3	Wladimiro Panizza (ITA)	Vibor	s.t.
4	Carmelo Barone (ITA)	Fiorella–Citroen	s.t.
5	Ronald De Witte (BEL)	Sanson–Campagnolo	s.t.
6	Luciano Loro (ITA)	Mecap–Selle Italia	s.t.
7	Piero Falorni (ITA)	Gis Gelati	+ 5"
8	Ludo Delcroix (BEL)	IJsboerke–Gios	s.t.
9	Ottavio Crepaldi (ITA)	Magniflex–Torpado	s.t.
10	Rik Van Linden (BEL)	Bianchi–Faema	s.t.

General classification after Stage 9

Rank	Rider	Team	Time
1	Johan De Muynck (BEL)	Bianchi–Faema	45h 37' 15"
2	Francesco Moser (ITA)	Sanson–Campagnolo	+ 15"
3	Giuseppe Saronni (ITA)	Scic–Bottecchia	+ 26"
4	Wladimiro Panizza (ITA)	Vibor	+ 34"
5	Ronald De Witte (BEL)	Sanson–Campagnolo	+ 51"
6	Ottavio Crepaldi (ITA)	Magniflex–Torpado	+ 56"
7	Roberto Visentini (ITA)	Vibor	+ 1' 08"
8	Giovanni Battaglin (ITA)	Fiorella–Citroen	+ 1' 21"
9	Gianbattista Baronchelli (ITA)	Scic–Bottecchia	+ 1' 30"
10	Bernt Johansson (SWE)	Fiorella–Citroen	+ 1' 37"

== Stage 10 ==
17 May 1978 — Latina to Lago di Piediluco, 220 km (140 mi)

Stage 10 result

Rank	Rider	Team	Time
1	Giuseppe Martinelli (ITA)	Scic–Bottecchia	6h 13' 10"
2	Rudy Pevenage (BEL)	IJsboerke–Gios	s.t.
3	Carlo Zoni (ITA)	Selle Royal–Inoxpran	+ 3"
4	Walter Dusi (ITA)	Intercontinentale Assicurazioni	+ 1' 34"
5	Aldo Parecchini (ITA)	Selle Royal–Inoxpran	s.t.
6	Wladimiro Panizza (ITA)	Vibor	+ 2' 37"
7	Giovanni Battaglin (ITA)	Fiorella–Citroen	+ 5"
8	Gianbattista Baronchelli (ITA)	Scic–Bottecchia	s.t.
9	Johan De Muynck (BEL)	Bianchi–Faema	s.t.
10	Giuseppe Saronni (ITA)	Scic–Bottecchia	+ 4' 22"

General classification after Stage 10

Rank	Rider	Team	Time
1	Johan De Muynck (BEL)	Bianchi–Faema	51h 53' 09"
2	Wladimiro Panizza (ITA)	Vibor	+ 34"
3	Giovanni Battaglin (ITA)	Fiorella–Citroen	+ 1' 21"
4	Gianbattista Baronchelli (ITA)	Scic–Bottecchia	+ 1' 30"
5	Francesco Moser (ITA)	Sanson–Campagnolo	+ 2' 05"
6	Giuseppe Saronni (ITA)	Scic–Bottecchia	+ 2' 16"
7	Ronald De Witte (BEL)	Sanson–Campagnolo	+ 2' 41"
8	Roberto Visentini (ITA)	Vibor	+ 2' 58"
9	Bernt Johansson (SWE)	Fiorella–Citroen	+ 3' 27"
10	Roger De Vlaeminck (BEL)	Sanson–Campagnolo	+ 3' 28"
