= List of teams and cyclists in the 1976 Giro d'Italia =

The 1976 Giro d'Italia was the 59th edition of the Giro d'Italia, one of cycling's Grand Tours. The field consisted of 120 riders, and 86 riders finished the race.

== By rider ==
Legend
No.	Starting number worn by the rider during the Giro
Pos.	Position in the general classification
DNF	Denotes a rider who did not finish

No.	Name	Nationality	Team	Ref
1	Fausto Bertoglio	Italy	Jollj Ceramica–Decor	
2	Alessio Antonini	Italy	Jollj Ceramica–Decor	
3	Giovanni Battaglin	Italy	Jollj Ceramica–Decor	
4	Marcello Bergamo	Italy	Jollj Ceramica–Decor	
5	Alfredo Chinetti	Italy	Jollj Ceramica–Decor	
6	Simone Fraccaro	Italy	Jollj Ceramica–Decor	
7	Pierino Gavazzi	Italy	Jollj Ceramica–Decor	
8	Knut Knudsen	Norway	Jollj Ceramica–Decor	
9	Donato Giuliani	Italy	Jollj Ceramica–Decor	
10	Sandro Quintarelli	Italy	Jollj Ceramica–Decor	
11	Felice Gimondi	Italy	Bianchi–Campagnolo	
12	Rik Van Linden	Belgium	Bianchi–Campagnolo	
13	Luigi Castelletti	Italy	Bianchi–Campagnolo	
14	Giovanni Cavalcanti	Italy	Bianchi–Campagnolo	
15	Fabrizio Fabbri	Italy	Bianchi–Campagnolo	
16	Antoine Houbrechts	Belgium	Bianchi–Campagnolo	
17	Serge Parsani	Italy	Bianchi–Campagnolo	
18	Giacinto Santambrogio	Italy	Bianchi–Campagnolo	
19	Willy Singer	West Germany	Bianchi–Campagnolo	
20	Alex Van Linden	Belgium	Bianchi–Campagnolo	
21	Roger De Vlaeminck	Belgium	Brooklyn	
22	Patrick Sercu	Belgium	Brooklyn	
23	Giancarlo Bellini	Italy	Brooklyn	
24	Willy De Geest	Belgium	Brooklyn	
25	Ronald De Witte	Belgium	Brooklyn	
26	Ercole Gualazzini	Italy	Brooklyn	
27	Ottavio Crepaldi	Italy	Brooklyn	
28	Marcello Osler	Italy	Brooklyn	
29	Johan De Muynck	Belgium	Brooklyn	
30	Aldo Parecchini	Italy	Brooklyn	
31	Marino Basso	Italy	Furzi–Vibor	
32	Davide Boifava	Italy	Furzi–Vibor	
33	Antonio Colpo	Italy	Furzi–Vibor	
34	Jørgen Marcussen	Denmark	Furzi–Vibor	
35	Daniele Mazziero	Italy	Furzi–Vibor	
36	Gabriele Mugnaini	Italy	Furzi–Vibor	
37	Giuseppe Rodella	Italy	Furzi–Vibor	
38	Tullio Rossi	Italy	Furzi–Vibor	
39	Bruno Vicino	Italy	Furzi–Vibor	
40	Italo Zilioli	Italy	Furzi–Vibor	
41	Pietro Algeri	Italy	G.B.C.	
42	Franco Calvi	Italy	G.B.C.	
43	Gianni Motta	Italy	G.B.C.	
44	Giancarlo Polidori	Italy	G.B.C.	
45	Leone Pizzini	Italy	G.B.C.	
46	Dorino Vanzo	Italy	G.B.C.	
47	Bruno Zanoni	Italy	G.B.C.	
48	Rocco Gatta	Italy	G.B.C.	
49	Bas Hordjik	Netherlands	G.B.C.	
50	Jan Brinkman	Netherlands	G.B.C.	
51	Francisco Galdós	Spain	Kas–Campagnolo	
52	Antonio González Linares	Spain	Kas–Campagnolo	
53	Antonio Martos	Spain	Kas–Campagnolo	
54	Antonio Menéndez	Spain	Kas–Campagnolo	
55	José Nazabal	Spain	Kas–Campagnolo	
56	Juan Manuel Santisteban	Spain	Kas–Campagnolo	
57	Carlos Ocaña	Spain	Kas–Campagnolo	
58	Andrés Oliva	Spain	Kas–Campagnolo	
59	Sebastián Pozo	Spain	Kas–Campagnolo	
60	Juan Pujol	Spain	Kas–Campagnolo	
61	Glauco Santoni	Italy	Magniflex–Torpado	
62	Giuseppe Perletto	Italy	Magniflex–Torpado	
63	Gary Clively	Australia	Magniflex–Torpado	
64	Gianni Di Lorenzo	Italy	Magniflex–Torpado	
65	Ruggero Gialdini	Italy	Magniflex–Torpado	
66	Armando Lora	Italy	Magniflex–Torpado	
67	Wilmo Francioni	Italy	Magniflex–Torpado	
68	Giancarlo Tartoni	Italy	Magniflex–Torpado	
69	Daniele Tinchella	Italy	Magniflex–Torpado	
70	Alfio Vandi	Italy	Magniflex–Torpado	
71	Eddy Merckx	Belgium	Molteni–Campagnolo	
72	Joseph Borguet	Belgium	Molteni–Campagnolo	
73	Joseph Bruyère	Belgium	Molteni–Campagnolo	
74	Ludo Delcroix	Belgium	Molteni–Campagnolo	
75	Bernard Draux	Belgium	Molteni–Campagnolo	
76	Jos Deschoenmaecker	Belgium	Molteni–Campagnolo	
77	Edward Janssens	Belgium	Molteni–Campagnolo	
78	Karel Rottiers	Belgium	Molteni–Campagnolo	
79	Cees Bal	Netherlands	Molteni–Campagnolo	
80	Frans Van Looy	Belgium	Molteni–Campagnolo	
81	Francesco Moser	Italy	Sanson	
82	Claudio Bortolotto	Italy	Sanson	
83	Phil Edwards	Great Britain	Sanson	
84	Sigfrido Fontanelli	Italy	Sanson	
85	Renato Marchetti	Italy	Sanson	
86	Roberto Poggiali	Italy	Sanson	
87	Ole Ritter	Denmark	Sanson	
88	Luciano Rossignoli	Italy	Sanson	
89	Mauro Simonetti	Italy	Sanson	
90	Roberto Sorlini	Italy	Sanson	
91	Gianbattista Baronchelli	Italy	Scic	
92	Gaetano Baronchelli	Italy	Scic	
93	Attilio Rota	Italy	Scic	
94	Luciano Conati	Italy	Scic	
95	Arnaldo Caverzasi	Italy	Scic	
96	José Grande	Italy	Scic	
97	Miguel María Lasa	Spain	Scic	
98	Wladimiro Panizza	Italy	Scic	
99	Enrico Paolini	Italy	Scic	
100	Walter Riccomi	Italy	Scic	
101	Joaquim Agostinho	Portugal	Teka	
102	Gonzalo Aja	Spain	Teka	
103	Fernando Mendes	Portugal	Teka	
104	Alejandro Menendez	Spain	Teka	
105	Andrés Gandarias	Spain	Teka	
106	Ventura Díaz	Spain	Teka	
107	Julián Andiano	Spain	Teka	
108	Antonio Prieto	Spain	Teka	
109	Manuel Esparza	Spain	Teka	
110	Jesús López Carril	Spain	Teka	
111	Franco Bitossi	Italy	Zonca–Santini	
112	Alberto Caiumi	Italy	Zonca–Santini	
113	Enrico Guadrini	Italy	Zonca–Santini	
114	Renato Laghi	Italy	Zonca–Santini	
115	Adriano Pella	Italy	Zonca–Santini	
116	Pasquale Pugliese	Italy	Zonca–Santini	
117	Roland Salm	Switzerland	Zonca–Santini	
118	Piero Spinelli	Italy	Zonca–Santini	
119	Ueli Sutter	Switzerland	Zonca–Santini	
120	Luigi Venturato	Italy	Zonca–Santini	
