= 1976 Giro d'Italia, Stage 12 to Stage 22b =

Cycling race stages

The 1976 Giro d'Italia was the 59th edition of the Giro d'Italia, one of cycling's Grand Tours. The Giro actually began in Catania on 21 May, and Stage 12 occurred on 1 June with a mountainous stage from Gabicce Mare. The race finished in Milan on 12 June.

== Stage 12 ==
1 June 1976 — Gabicce Mare to Porretta Terme, 215 km (134 mi)

Stage 12 result

Rank	Rider	Team	Time
1	Sigfrido Fontanelli (ITA)	Sanson	6h 37' 29"
2	Wilmo Francioni (ITA)	Magniflex–Torpado	+ 16"
3	Francesco Moser (ITA)	Sanson	+ 2' 10"
4	Roger De Vlaeminck (BEL)	Brooklyn	s.t.
5	Bruno Vicino (ITA)	Furzi–Vibor{{main other|	s.t.
6	Ronald De Witte (BEL)	Brooklyn	s.t.
7	Luciano Rossignoli (ITA)	Sanson	s.t.
8	Fabrizio Fabbri (ITA)	Bianchi–Campagnolo	s.t.
9	Bernard Draux (BEL)	Molteni–Campagnolo	s.t.
10	Gianbattista Baronchelli (ITA)	Scic	s.t.

General classification after Stage 12

Rank	Rider	Team	Time
1	Felice Gimondi (ITA)	Bianchi–Campagnolo	65h 22' 54"
2	Johan De Muynck (BEL)	Brooklyn	+ 44"
3	Francesco Moser (ITA)	Sanson	+ 52"
4	Roger De Vlaeminck (BEL)	Brooklyn	+ 54"
5	Eddy Merckx (BEL)	Molteni–Campagnolo	+ 1' 04"
6	Wladimiro Panizza (ITA)	Scic	+ 1' 12"
7	Giancarlo Bellini (ITA)	Brooklyn	+ 1' 31"
8	Gianbattista Baronchelli (ITA)	Scic	+ 1' 34"
9	Fausto Bertoglio (ITA)	Jollj Ceramica–Decor	+ 1' 40"
10	Giovanni Battaglin (ITA)	Jollj Ceramica–Decor	+ 1' 43"

== Stage 13 ==
2 June 1976 — Porretta Terme to Il Ciocco, 146 km (91 mi)

Stage 13 result

Rank	Rider	Team	Time
1	Ronald De Witte (BEL)	Brooklyn	4h 29' 05"
2	Wladimiro Panizza (ITA)	Scic	+ 2"
3	Gianbattista Baronchelli (ITA)	Scic	s.t.
4	Fausto Bertoglio (ITA)	Jollj Ceramica–Decor	+ 3"
5	Johan De Muynck (BEL)	Brooklyn	+ 9"
6	José Nazabal (ESP)	Kas–Campagnolo	s.t.
7	Giuseppe Perletto (ITA)	Magniflex–Torpado	+ 33"
8	Juan Pujol (ESP)	Kas–Campagnolo	s.t.
9	Roger De Vlaeminck (BEL)	Brooklyn	+ 37"
10	Felice Gimondi (ITA)	Bianchi–Campagnolo	s.t.

General classification after Stage 13

Rank	Rider	Team	Time
1	Felice Gimondi (ITA)	Bianchi–Campagnolo	69h 52' 36"
2	Johan De Muynck (BEL)	Brooklyn	+ 16"
3	Wladimiro Panizza (ITA)	Scic	+ 37"
4	Roger De Vlaeminck (BEL)	Brooklyn	+ 54"
5	Gianbattista Baronchelli (ITA)	Scic	+ 59"
6	Fausto Bertoglio (ITA)	Jollj Ceramica–Decor	+ 1' 06"
7	Francesco Moser (ITA)	Sanson	+ 1' 09"
8	Ronald De Witte (BEL)	Brooklyn	+ 1' 16"
9	Eddy Merckx (BEL)	Molteni–Campagnolo	+ 1' 23"
10	Giancarlo Bellini (ITA)	Brooklyn	+ 1' 39"

== Stage 14 ==
3 June 1976 — Il Ciocco to Varazze, 227 km (141 mi)

Stage 14 result

Rank	Rider	Team	Time
1	Francesco Moser (ITA)	Sanson	6h 29' 05"
2	Miguel María Lasa (ESP)	Scic	+ 2"
3	Patrick Sercu (BEL)	Brooklyn	+ 4"
4	Marino Basso (ITA)	Furzi–Vibor{{main other|	s.t.
5	Rik Van Linden (BEL)	Bianchi–Campagnolo	s.t.
6	Alessio Antonini (ITA)	Jollj Ceramica–Decor	s.t.
7	Roger De Vlaeminck (BEL)	Brooklyn	s.t.
8	Frans Van Looy (BEL)	Molteni–Campagnolo	s.t.
9	Bruno Vicino (ITA)	Furzi–Vibor{{main other|	s.t.
10	Pierino Gavazzi (ITA)	Jollj Ceramica–Decor	s.t.

General classification after Stage 14

Rank	Rider	Team	Time
1	Felice Gimondi (ITA)	Bianchi–Campagnolo	76h 21' 45"
2	Johan De Muynck (BEL)	Brooklyn	+ 16"
3	Wladimiro Panizza (ITA)	Scic	+ 37"
4	Roger De Vlaeminck (BEL)	Brooklyn	+ 54"
5	Gianbattista Baronchelli (ITA)	Scic	+ 59"
6	Francesco Moser (ITA)	Sanson	+ 1' 05"
7	Fausto Bertoglio (ITA)	Jollj Ceramica–Decor	+ 1' 06"
8	Ronald De Witte (BEL)	Brooklyn	+ 1' 16"
9	Eddy Merckx (BEL)	Molteni–Campagnolo	+ 1' 23"
10	Giancarlo Bellini (ITA)	Brooklyn	+ 1' 39"

== Rest day ==
4 June 1976

== Stage 15 ==
5 June 1976 — Varazze to Ozegna, 216 km (134 mi)

Stage 15 result

Rank	Rider	Team	Time
1	Rik Van Linden (BEL)	Bianchi–Campagnolo	6h 04' 24"
2	Patrick Sercu (BEL)	Brooklyn	s.t.
3	Marino Basso (ITA)	Furzi–Vibor{{main other|	s.t.
4	Pierino Gavazzi (ITA)	Jollj Ceramica–Decor	s.t.
5	Roger De Vlaeminck (BEL)	Brooklyn	s.t.
6	Francesco Moser (ITA)	Sanson	s.t.
7	Giancarlo Polidori (ITA)	G.B.C.	s.t.
8	Aldo Parecchini (ITA)	Brooklyn	s.t.
9	Enrico Paolini (ITA)	Scic	s.t.
10	Marcello Osler (ITA)	Brooklyn	s.t.

General classification after Stage 15

Rank	Rider	Team	Time
1	Felice Gimondi (ITA)	Bianchi–Campagnolo	82h 26' 09"
2	Johan De Muynck (BEL)	Brooklyn	+ 16"
3	Wladimiro Panizza (ITA)	Scic	+ 37"
4	Roger De Vlaeminck (BEL)	Brooklyn	+ 54"
5	Gianbattista Baronchelli (ITA)	Scic	+ 59"
6	Francesco Moser (ITA)	Sanson	+ 1' 05"
7	Fausto Bertoglio (ITA)	Jollj Ceramica–Decor	+ 1' 06"
8	Ronald De Witte (BEL)	Brooklyn	+ 1' 16"
9	Eddy Merckx (BEL)	Molteni–Campagnolo	+ 1' 23"
10	Giancarlo Bellini (ITA)	Brooklyn	+ 1' 39"

== Stage 16 ==
6 June 1976 — Castellamonte to Arosio, 258 km (160 mi)

Stage 16 result

Rank	Rider	Team	Time
1	Roger De Vlaeminck (BEL)	Brooklyn	7h 16' 05"
2	Felice Gimondi (ITA)	Bianchi–Campagnolo	s.t.
3	Francesco Moser (ITA)	Sanson	s.t.
4	Gary Clively (AUS)	Magniflex–Torpado	s.t.
5	Marcello Bergamo (ITA)	Jollj Ceramica–Decor	s.t.
6	Eddy Merckx (BEL)	Molteni–Campagnolo	s.t.
7	Gianbattista Baronchelli (ITA)	Scic	s.t.
8	Claudio Bortolotto (ITA)	Sanson	s.t.
9	Wladimiro Panizza (ITA)	Scic	s.t.
10	Simone Fraccaro (ITA)	Jollj Ceramica–Decor	s.t.

General classification after Stage 16

Rank	Rider	Team	Time
1	Felice Gimondi (ITA)	Bianchi–Campagnolo	89h 42' 14"
2	Johan De Muynck (BEL)	Brooklyn	+ 16"
3	Wladimiro Panizza (ITA)	Scic	+ 37"
4	Roger De Vlaeminck (BEL)	Brooklyn	+ 54"
5	Gianbattista Baronchelli (ITA)	Scic	+ 59"
6	Francesco Moser (ITA)	Sanson	+ 1' 05"
7	Fausto Bertoglio (ITA)	Jollj Ceramica–Decor	+ 1' 06"
8	Ronald De Witte (BEL)	Brooklyn	+ 1' 16"
9	Eddy Merckx (BEL)	Molteni–Campagnolo	+ 1' 23"
10	Giancarlo Bellini (ITA)	Brooklyn	+ 1' 39"

== Stage 17 ==
7 June 1976 — Arosio to Verona, 196 km (122 mi)

Stage 17 result

Rank	Rider	Team	Time
1	Ercole Gualazzini (ITA)	Brooklyn	4h 52' 16"
2	Daniele Tinchella (ITA)	Magniflex–Torpado	s.t.
3	Rik Van Linden (BEL)	Bianchi–Campagnolo	s.t.
4	Alessio Antonini (ITA)	Jollj Ceramica–Decor	s.t.
5	Francesco Moser (ITA)	Sanson	s.t.
6	Frans Van Looy (BEL)	Molteni–Campagnolo	s.t.
7	Pietro Algeri (ITA)	G.B.C.	s.t.
8	Phil Edwards (GBR)	Sanson	s.t.
9	Sandro Quintarelli (ITA)	Jollj Ceramica–Decor	s.t.
10	Tullio Rossi (ITA)	Furzi–Vibor{{main other|	s.t.

General classification after Stage 17

Rank	Rider	Team	Time
1	Felice Gimondi (ITA)	Bianchi–Campagnolo	94h 34' 30"
2	Johan De Muynck (BEL)	Brooklyn	+ 16"
3	Wladimiro Panizza (ITA)	Scic	+ 37"
4	Roger De Vlaeminck (BEL)	Brooklyn	+ 54"
5	Gianbattista Baronchelli (ITA)	Scic	+ 58"
6	Francesco Moser (ITA)	Sanson	+ 1' 05"
7	Fausto Bertoglio (ITA)	Jollj Ceramica–Decor	+ 1' 06"
8	Ronald De Witte (BEL)	Brooklyn	+ 1' 16"
9	Eddy Merckx (BEL)	Molteni–Campagnolo	+ 1' 23"
10	Giancarlo Bellini (ITA)	Brooklyn	+ 2' 45"

== Stage 18 ==
8 June 1976 — Verona to Longarone, 174 km (108 mi)

Stage 18 result

Rank	Rider	Team	Time
1	Simone Fraccaro (ITA)	Jollj Ceramica–Decor	4h 59' 08"
2	Miguel María Lasa (ESP)	Scic	+ 13"
3	Marino Basso (ITA)	Furzi–Vibor{{main other|	s.t.
4	Roger De Vlaeminck (BEL)	Brooklyn	s.t.
5	Pierino Gavazzi (ITA)	Jollj Ceramica–Decor	s.t.
6	Enrico Paolini (ITA)	Scic	s.t.
7	Alex Van Linden (BEL)	Bianchi–Campagnolo	s.t.
8	Alessio Antonini (ITA)	Jollj Ceramica–Decor	s.t.
9	Daniele Tinchella (ITA)	Magniflex–Torpado	s.t.
10	Giancarlo Polidori (ITA)	G.B.C.	s.t.

General classification after Stage 18

Rank	Rider	Team	Time
1	Felice Gimondi (ITA)	Bianchi–Campagnolo	99h 33' 51"
2	Johan De Muynck (BEL)	Brooklyn	+ 16"
3	Wladimiro Panizza (ITA)	Scic	+ 37"
4	Roger De Vlaeminck (BEL)	Brooklyn	+ 54"
5	Gianbattista Baronchelli (ITA)	Scic	+ 59"
6	Francesco Moser (ITA)	Sanson	+ 1' 05"
7	Fausto Bertoglio (ITA)	Jollj Ceramica–Decor	+ 1' 06"
8	Ronald De Witte (BEL)	Brooklyn	+ 1' 16"
9	Eddy Merckx (BEL)	Molteni–Campagnolo	+ 1' 23"
10	Giancarlo Bellini (ITA)	Brooklyn	+ 2' 45"

== Stage 19 ==
9 June 1976 — Longarone to Vajolet Towers, 132 km (82 mi)

Stage 19 result

Rank	Rider	Team	Time
1	Andrés Gandarias (ESP)	Teka	4h 25' 59"
2	Fausto Bertoglio (ITA)	Jollj Ceramica–Decor	+ 1' 07"
3	Johan De Muynck (BEL)	Brooklyn	+ 1' 25"
4	Felice Gimondi (ITA)	Bianchi–Campagnolo	+ 2' 04"
5	Walter Riccomi (ITA)	Scic	+ 2' 10"
6	Ronald De Witte (BEL)	Brooklyn	+ 2' 13"
7	Enrico Guadrini (ITA)	Zonca–Santini	+ 2' 15"
8	José Nazabal (ESP)	Kas–Campagnolo	s.t.
9	Francesco Moser (ITA)	Sanson	+ 2' 29"
10	Eddy Merckx (BEL)	Molteni–Campagnolo	+ 2' 44"

General classification after Stage 19

Rank	Rider	Team	Time
1	Johan De Muynck (BEL)	Brooklyn	104h 01' 31"
2	Felice Gimondi (ITA)	Bianchi–Campagnolo	+ 25"
3	Fausto Bertoglio (ITA)	Jollj Ceramica–Decor	+ 32"
4	Ronald De Witte (BEL)	Brooklyn	+ 1' 48"
5	Francesco Moser (ITA)	Sanson	+ 1' 53"
6	Gianbattista Baronchelli (ITA)	Scic	+ 2' 02"
7	Eddy Merckx (BEL)	Molteni–Campagnolo	+ 2' 26"
8	Wladimiro Panizza (ITA)	Scic	+ 2' 52"
9	José Nazabal (ESP)	Kas–Campagnolo	+ 3' 28"
10	Alfio Vandi (ITA)	Magniflex–Torpado	+ 4' 19"

== Stage 20 ==
10 June 1976 — Vigo di Fassa to Terme di Comano, 170 km (110 mi)

Stage 20 result

Rank	Rider	Team	Time
1	Luciano Conati (ITA)	Scic	5h 13' 38"
2	Enrico Guadrini (ITA)	Zonca–Santini	+ 1"
3	Arnaldo Caverzasi (ITA)	Scic	+ 1' 58"
4	Francesco Moser (ITA)	Sanson	s.t.
5	Felice Gimondi (ITA)	Bianchi–Campagnolo	s.t.
6	Johan De Muynck (BEL)	Brooklyn	s.t.
7	Giacinto Santambrogio (ITA)	Bianchi–Campagnolo	s.t.
8	Alfio Vandi (ITA)	Magniflex–Torpado	s.t.
9	Fausto Bertoglio (ITA)	Jollj Ceramica–Decor	s.t.
10	Walter Riccomi (ITA)	Scic	s.t.

General classification after Stage 20

Rank	Rider	Team	Time
1	Johan De Muynck (BEL)	Brooklyn	109h 17' 07"
2	Felice Gimondi (ITA)	Bianchi–Campagnolo	+ 25"
3	Fausto Bertoglio (ITA)	Jollj Ceramica–Decor	+ 32"
4	Francesco Moser (ITA)	Sanson	+ 1' 53"
5	Gianbattista Baronchelli (ITA)	Scic	+ 2' 02"
6	Wladimiro Panizza (ITA)	Scic	+ 2' 52"
7	Alfio Vandi (ITA)	Magniflex–Torpado	+ 4' 19"
8	Walter Riccomi (ITA)	Scic	+ 7' 40"
9	Juan Pujol (ESP)	Kas–Campagnolo	+ 8' 13"
10	Eddy Merckx (BEL)	Molteni–Campagnolo	+ 8' 25"

== Stage 21 ==
11 June 1976 — Terme di Comano to Bergamo, 238 km (148 mi)

Stage 21 result

Rank	Rider	Team	Time
1	Felice Gimondi (ITA)	Bianchi–Campagnolo	7h 44' 53"
2	Eddy Merckx (BEL)	Molteni–Campagnolo	s.t.
3	Gianbattista Baronchelli (ITA)	Scic	s.t.
4	Francesco Moser (ITA)	Sanson	s.t.
5	Wladimiro Panizza (ITA)	Scic	s.t.
6	Manuel Esparza (ESP)	Teka	s.t.
7	Italo Zilioli (ITA)	Furzi–Vibor{{main other|	s.t.
8	Alfio Vandi (ITA)	Magniflex–Torpado	s.t.
9	Johan De Muynck (BEL)	Brooklyn	s.t.
10	Fabrizio Fabbri (ITA)	Bianchi–Campagnolo	s.t.

General classification after Stage 21

Rank	Rider	Team	Time
1	Johan De Muynck (BEL)	Brooklyn	117h 02' 00"
2	Felice Gimondi (ITA)	Bianchi–Campagnolo	+ 25"
3	Fausto Bertoglio (ITA)	Jollj Ceramica–Decor	+ 32"
4	Francesco Moser (ITA)	Sanson	+ 1' 53"
5	Gianbattista Baronchelli (ITA)	Scic	+ 2' 02"
6	Wladimiro Panizza (ITA)	Scic	+ 2' 52"
7	Alfio Vandi (ITA)	Magniflex–Torpado	+ 4' 19"
8	Walter Riccomi (ITA)	Scic	+ 7' 40"
9	Juan Pujol (ESP)	Kas–Campagnolo	+ 8' 13"
10	Eddy Merckx (BEL)	Molteni–Campagnolo	+ 8' 25"

== Stage 22a ==
12 June 1976 — Arcore to Arcore, 28 km (17 mi) (ITT)

Stage 22a result

Rank	Rider	Team	Time
1	Joseph Bruyère (BEL)	Molteni–Campagnolo	35' 21"
2	Jørgen Marcussen (DEN)	Furzi–Vibor{{main other|	+ 19"
3	Francesco Moser (ITA)	Sanson	+ 22"
4	Eddy Merckx (BEL)	Molteni–Campagnolo	+ 23"
5	Gianbattista Baronchelli (ITA)	Scic	+ 41"
6	Felice Gimondi (ITA)	Bianchi–Campagnolo	+ 43"
7	Wladimiro Panizza (ITA)	Scic	+ 51"
8	Alfio Vandi (ITA)	Magniflex–Torpado	+ 56"
9	Davide Boifava (ITA)	Furzi–Vibor{{main other|	+ 1' 11"
10	Karel Rottiers (BEL)	Molteni–Campagnolo	+ 1' 16"

General classification after Stage 22a

Rank	Rider	Team	Time
1	Felice Gimondi (ITA)	Bianchi–Campagnolo	117h 38' 59"
2	Johan De Muynck (BEL)	Brooklyn	+ 19"
3	Fausto Bertoglio (ITA)	Jollj Ceramica–Decor	+ 49"
4	Francesco Moser (ITA)	Sanson	+ 1' 07"
5	Gianbattista Baronchelli (ITA)	Scic	+ 1' 35"
6	Wladimiro Panizza (ITA)	Scic	+ 2' 35"
7	Alfio Vandi (ITA)	Magniflex–Torpado	+ 4' 07"
8	Eddy Merckx (BEL)	Molteni–Campagnolo	+ 7' 40"
9	Walter Riccomi (ITA)	Scic	+ 8' 49"
10	Juan Pujol (ESP)	Kas–Campagnolo	+ 8' 50"

== Stage 22b ==
12 June 1976 — Milan to Milan, 106 km (66 mi)

Stage 22b result

Rank	Rider	Team	Time
1	Daniele Tinchella (ITA)	Magniflex–Torpado	2h 19' 46"
2	Francesco Moser (ITA)	Sanson	s.t.
3	Marino Basso (ITA)	Furzi–Vibor{{main other|	s.t.
4	Pierino Gavazzi (ITA)	Jollj Ceramica–Decor	s.t.
5	Frans Van Looy (BEL)	Molteni–Campagnolo	s.t.
6	Giancarlo Polidori (ITA)	G.B.C.	s.t.
7	Eddy Merckx (BEL)	Molteni–Campagnolo	s.t.
8	Alfredo Chinetti (ITA)	Jollj Ceramica–Decor	s.t.
9	Enrico Paolini (ITA)	Scic	s.t.
10	Aldo Parecchini (ITA)	Brooklyn	s.t.

General classification after Stage 22b

Rank	Rider	Team	Time
1	Felice Gimondi (ITA)	Bianchi–Campagnolo	119h 58' 15"
2	Johan De Muynck (BEL)	Brooklyn	+ 19"
3	Fausto Bertoglio (ITA)	Jollj Ceramica–Decor	+ 49"
4	Francesco Moser (ITA)	Sanson	+ 1' 07"
5	Gianbattista Baronchelli (ITA)	Scic	+ 1' 35"
6	Wladimiro Panizza (ITA)	Scic	+ 2' 35"
7	Alfio Vandi (ITA)	Magniflex–Torpado	+ 4' 07"
8	Eddy Merckx (BEL)	Molteni–Campagnolo	+ 7' 40"
9	Walter Riccomi (ITA)	Scic	+ 8' 49"
10	Juan Pujol (ESP)	Kas–Campagnolo	+ 8' 50"
