= 1978 Milan–San Remo =

Race details
- Dates: 18 March 1978
- Stages: 1
- Distance: 288 km (179 mi)
- Winning time: 6h 47' 35"

Results
	Winner	Roger De Vlaeminck (BEL)	(Sanson–Campagnolo)
	Second	Giuseppe Saronni (ITA)	(Scic–Bottecchia)
	Third	Alessio Antonini (ITA)	(Selle Royal–Inoxpran)

The 1978 Milan–San Remo was the 69th edition of the Milan–San Remo cycle race and was held on 18 March 1978. The race started in Milan and finished in San Remo. The race was won by Roger De Vlaeminck of the Sanson team.

== General classification ==
Final general classification

Rank	Rider	Team	Time
1	Roger De Vlaeminck (BEL)	Sanson–Campagnolo	6h 47' 35"
2	Giuseppe Saronni (ITA)	Scic–Bottecchia	+ 0"
3	Alessio Antonini (ITA)	Selle Royal–Inoxpran	+ 0"
4	Yves Hézard (FRA)	Peugeot–Esso–Michelin	+ 16"
5	Rik Van Linden (BEL)	Bianchi–Faema	+ 21"
6	Francesco Moser (ITA)	Sanson–Campagnolo	+ 21"
7	Giuseppe Martinelli (ITA)	Magniflex–Torpado	+ 21"
8	Jacques Esclassan (FRA)	Peugeot–Esso–Michelin	+ 21"
9	Marcello Osler (ITA)	Selle Royal–Inoxpran	+ 21"
10	Clyde Sefton (AUS)	Fiorella–Mocassini–Citroën	+ 21"
