= 1978 Tirreno–Adriatico =

Race details
- Dates: 11–16 March 1978
- Stages: 5 + Prologue
- Distance: 864 km (536.9 mi)
- Winning time: 22h 08' 46"

Results
	Winner	Giuseppe Saronni (ITA)	(Scic–Bottecchia)
	Second	Knut Knudsen (NOR)	(Bianchi–Faema)
	Third	Francesco Moser (ITA)	(Sanson–Campagnolo)

The 1978 Tirreno–Adriatico was the 13th edition of the Tirreno–Adriatico cycle race and was held from 11 March to 16 March 1978. The race started in Santa Marinella and finished in San Benedetto del Tronto. The race was won by Giuseppe Saronni of the Scic team.

== General classification ==
Final general classification

Rank	Rider	Team	Time
1	Giuseppe Saronni (ITA)	Scic–Bottecchia	22h 08' 46"
2	Knut Knudsen (NOR)	Bianchi–Faema	+ 12"
3	Francesco Moser (ITA)	Sanson–Campagnolo	+ 45"
4	Josef Fuchs (SUI)	Fiorella	+ 52"
5	Michel Pollentier (BEL)	Flandria–Velda–Lano	+ 1' 26"
6	Alfredo Chinetti (ITA)	Selle Royal–Inoxpran	+ 1' 45"
7	Fausto Bertoglio (ITA)	Selle Royal–Inoxpran	+ 2' 02"
8	Wladimiro Panizza (ITA)	Vibor	+ 2' 03"
9	Johan De Muynck (BEL)	Bianchi–Faema	+ 2' 18"
10	Bruno Wolfer (SUI)	Zonca	+ 2' 39"
