= Antonio Bonini =

Italian volleyball player (born 1954)

Personal information
- Nationality: Italian
- Born: 15 July 1954 (age 70); Parma, Italy

Sport
- Sport: Volleyball

Antonio Bonini (born 15 July 1954) is an Italian volleyball player. He competed in the men's tournament at the 1980 Summer Olympics.
