= Ignazio Paleari =

Italian cyclist (1954–2019)

Personal information
- Born: 13 February 1954
- Died: 29 October 2019 (aged 65)

Cycling career
- Sport: Cycling
- Role: Rider

Ignazio Paleari (13 February 1954 – 29 October 2019) was an Italian racing cyclist. He rode in the 1979 Tour de France.
