= Bernt Johansson =

Swedish cyclist (born 1953)

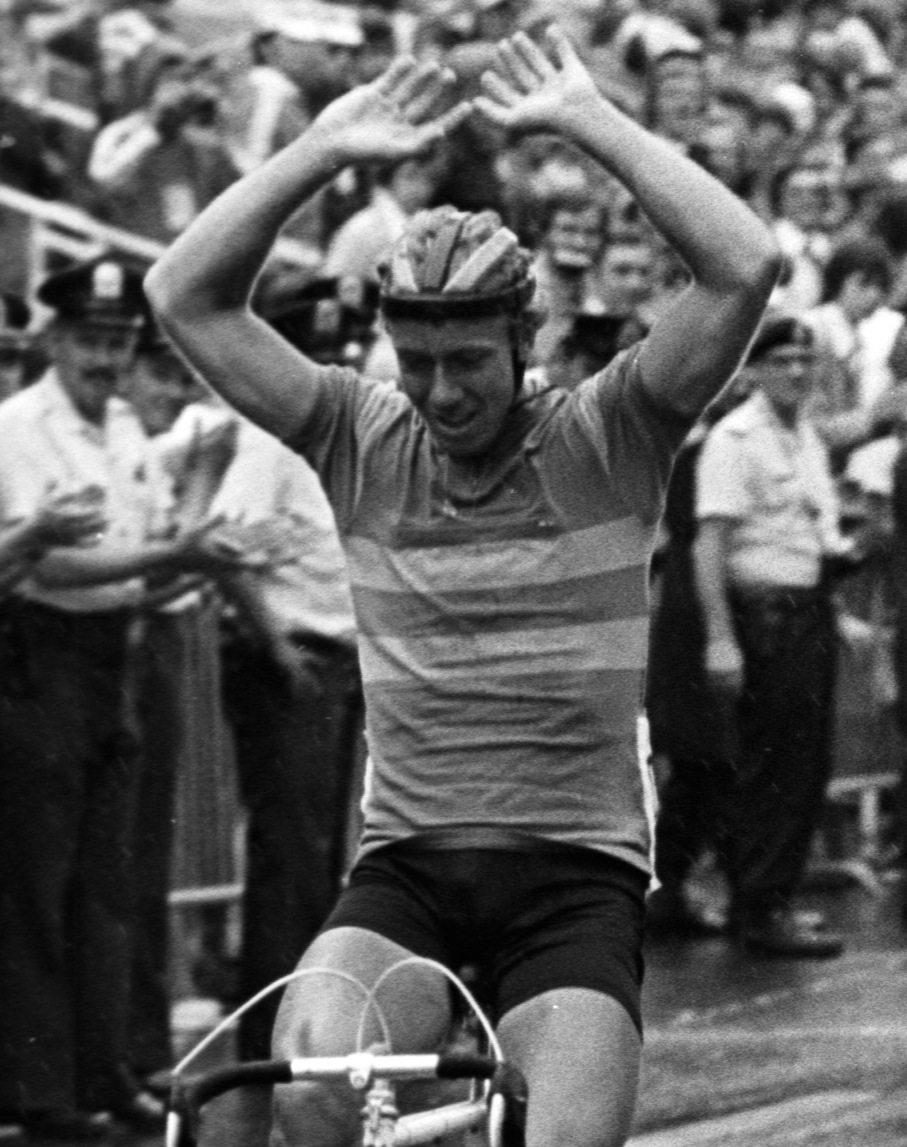
- Bernt Johansson winning the men's individual road race during the Olympic Summer Games in Montréal, Québec Province, Canada in July 1976

Personal information
- Full name: Bernt Harry Johansson
- Born: 18 April 1953 (age 73) Gothenburg, Sweden
- Height: 1.76 m (5 ft 9 in)
- Weight: 71 kg (157 lb)

Cycling career
- Sport: Cycling
- Discipline: Road
- Role: Rider

Professional teams
- 1977–1978: Fiorella–Mocassini
- 1979–1981: Magniflex–Famcucine

Major wins
- Grand Tours Giro d'Italia 2 individual stages (1979) One-day races and Classics Olympic Road Race (1976) Trofeo Baracchi (1977) Giro dell'Emilia (1978)
Medal record
Representing Sweden
Men's road bicycle racing
Olympic Games
Gold medal – first place	1976 Montreal	Individual road race
World Championships
Gold medal – first place	1974 Montreal	Team time trial

Bernt Harry Johansson (born 18 April 1953) is a Swedish former road bicycle racer, who was a professional rider from 1977 to 1981. His sporting career began with Mariestadcyklisten. A competitor at the 1972 Summer Olympics, he represented his native country once again at the 1976 Summer Olympics in Montreal, Quebec, Canada, where he won the men's individual road race. For that performance Johansson was awarded the Svenska Dagbladet Gold Medal the same year, together with track and field athlete Anders Gärderud, who claimed gold in the men's 3000 m steeplechase in Montreal.

== Career achievements ==
=== Major results ===
1972
3rd Road race, National Road Championships
1973
1st Stage 12 Tour d'Algérie
2nd Overall Milk Race
1974
1st Team time trial, UCI Road World Championships (with Tord Filipsson, Lennart Fagerlund & Sven-Åke Nilsson)
1st Road race, National Road Championships
1975
1st Overall Milk Race

1st Stage 8

1976
1st Road race, Summer Olympics
1st Stages 7 & 12 Tour du Maroc
1st Stage 7 Milk Race
1977
1st Overall Vuelta Ciclista a la Comunidad Valenciana

1st Stage 2

1st Trofeo Baracchi (with Carmelo Barone)
1st GP Forli
2nd Giro dell'Emilia
3rd Gran Piemonte
3rd Trofeo Laigueglia
3rd Giro del Veneto
3rd GP Industria & Commercio di Prato
1978
1st Gran Premio Industria e Commercio di Prato
1st Giro dell'Emilia
1st GP Forli
1st Stage 1c (ITT) Cronostaffetta
2nd Giro di Lombardia
2nd Giro del Lazio
3rd Trofeo Baracchi (with Gianbattista Baronchelli)
3rd GP Lugano
3rd Giro del Veneto
4th Giro di Toscana
4th Giro di Romagna
5th Coppa Placci
9th Overall Giro d'Italia
1979
1st Gran Premio Industria e Commercio di Prato
2nd Giro della Provincia di reggio Calabria
3rd Overall Giro d'Italia

1st Stages 11 & 14

3rd La Flèche Wallonne
3rd Giro dell'Appennino
3rd Coppa Placci
4th Overall Giro di Puglia
7th Giro di Romagna
8th Giro del Lazio
1980
1st Giro del Lazio
2nd Overall Vuelta a Andalucía

1st Stage 5b

4th Gran Piemonte
4th Giro dell'Emilia
6th Milano–Torino
7th Overall Tirreno–Adriatico
7th G.P. Camaiore
1981
2nd Giro della Provincia di reggio Calabria

=== Grand Tour general classification results timeline ===
Grand Tour	1977	1978	1979	1980	1981
Vuelta a España	—	—	—	—	—
Giro d'Italia	20	9	3	DNF	DNF
Tour de France	—	—	DNF	—	—

Legend
—	Did not compete
DNF	Did not finish

Preceded by Ingemar Stenmark	Svenska Dagbladet Gold Medal with Anders Gärderud; 1976	Succeeded by Frank Andersson
