= Gianfranco Foresti =

Italian cyclist

Personal information
- Born: 18 June 1950 (age 76)

Cycling career
- Sport: Cycling
- Role: Rider

Gianfranco Foresti (born 18 June 1950) is an Italian racing cyclist. He rode in the 1979 Tour de France.
