= Pasquale Pugliese =

Italian cyclist

Personal information
- Born: 6 November 1952 (age 73)

Cycling career
- Sport: Cycling
- Role: Rider

Pasquale Pugliese (born 6 November 1952) is an Italian racing cyclist. He rode in the 1979 Tour de France.
