= Gaetano Baronchelli =

Italian cyclist

Personal information
- Born: 21 April 1952 (age 74)

Cycling career
- Sport: Cycling
- Role: Rider

Gaetano Baronchelli (born 21 April 1952) is an Italian racing cyclist. He rode in the 1979 Tour de France.
