= Giancarlo Tartoni =

Italian cyclist (born 1948)

Personal information
- Born: 20 November 1948 (age 77)

Cycling career
- Sport: Cycling
- Role: Rider

Giancarlo Tartoni (born 20 November 1948) is an Italian racing cyclist. He won stage 13 of the 1977 Giro d'Italia.
