= Jürgen Kraft =

German cyclist

Personal information
- Born: 26 November 1951 Buseck, Germany
- Died: 11 June 2002 (aged 50) Berlin, Germany

Cycling career
- Sport: Cycling
- Role: Rider

Jürgen Kraft (26 November 1951 – 11 June 2002) was a German racing cyclist. He won the German National Road Race in 1977.
