= Carmelo Barone =

Italian cyclist

Personal information
- Born: 3 April 1956 (age 70) Avola, Italy

Cycling career
- Sport: Cycling

Carmelo Barone (born 3 April 1956) is an Italian former racing cyclist. Barone competed in the individual road race and team time trial events at the 1976 Summer Olympics.
