= Fiorella (cycling team) =

Italian cycling team (1977–1978)

Team information
- Registered: Italy
- Founded: 1977
- Disbanded: 1978
- Discipline: Road

Key personnel
- Team manager: Carlo Menicagli

Team name history
- 1977 1978: Fiorella–Mocassini; Fiorella–Mocassini–Citroën

Fiorella was an Italian professional cycling team that existed from 1977 to 1978.

The team was selected to race in two editions of the Giro d'Italia, but did not achieve any stage wins.

== Major wins ==
1977
Overall Vuelta a Levante, Bernt Johansson
Coppa Bernocchi, Carmelo Barone
1978
Coppa Bernocchi, Giovanni Battaglin
Giro dell'Emilia, Bernt Johansson
Gran Premio Industria e Commercio di Prato, Bernt Johansson
