= Ronald De Witte =

Belgian cyclist

Personal information
- Full name: Ronald De Witte
- Born: 21 October 1946 (age 79) Belgium

Cycling career
- Sport: Cycling
- Current team: Retired
- Discipline: Road
- Role: Rider

Major wins
- Paris–Tours (1976); 2 stages Tour de France

Ronald De Witte (born 21 October 1946 in Wilrijk) was a Belgian professional road bicycle racer.

== Major results ==
1969
Brussel - Bever
Mere
Grand Prix de Fourmies
1972
Omloop van West-Brabant
1973
Arendonk
De Panne
1974
Gullegem
Tour de France:

Winner stage 5

1975
Niel
Ruddervoorde
Scheldeprijs Vlaanderen
Zwevegem
Tour de France:

Winner stage 2

1976
Bellegem
Rummen
Paris–Tours
1977
Voerendaal
Putte-Mechelen
Giro d'Italia:

6th place overall classification

1978
Giro d'Italia:

6th place overall classification

1979
Sint-Gillis-Waas
Ottignies
