= Alessio Antonini =

Italian cyclist

Personal information
- Born: 7 June 1949 (age 77) Salò, Italy

Cycling career
- Sport: Cycling
- Role: Rider

Alessio Antonini (born 7 June 1949) is an Italian former professional racing cyclist. He rode in the 1975 Tour de France and 1976 Tour de France.
