= Pierino Gavazzi =

Italian cyclist (born 1950)

Personal information
- Full name: Pierino Gavazzi
- Born: 4 December 1950 (age 75) Provaglio d'Iseo, Italy

Cycling career
- Sport: Cycling
- Discipline: Road
- Role: Rider
- Rider type: Sprinter

Professional teams
- 1973–1977: Jollj Ceramica
- 1978–1979: Zonca–Santini
- 1980–1981: Magniflex–Olmo
- 1982–1986: Atala
- 1987–1988: Remac–Fanini
- 1989–1993: Polli–Mobiexport

Major wins
- Italian National Road Race Championship (1978, 1982, 1988); Giro d'Italia, 4 stages Milano–Torino (1978); Milan–San Remo (1980)

Pierino Gavazzi (born 4 December 1950 in Provaglio d'Iseo) is an Italian former road bicycle racer, who was professional from 1973 to 1993. He rode in the 1975 Tour de France and 1976 Tour de France, as well as in seventeen editions of the Giro d'Italia, winning four total stages. He also won the 1980 Milan–San Remo.

== Major results ==
1970
3rd Gran Premio della Liberazione
1972
2nd Piccolo Giro di Lombardia
1974
1st Stage 5 Giro d'Italia
2nd Nokere Koerse
4th Coppa Placci
1975
Volta a Catalunya

1st Stages 1b, 3 & 7a

3rd Coppa Sabatini
1976
1st Overall Cronostaffetta (TTT)
1st Stage 7b Volta a Catalunya
2nd Trofeo Matteotti
2nd GP Montelupo
3rd Trofeo Pantalica
3rd Giro di Toscana
3rd Coppa Placci
7th Giro dell'Emilia
8th Tre Valli Varesine
1977
1st Stage 16b Giro d'Italia
1st Overall Giro di Puglia

1st Stage 2

2nd Giro della Provincia di Reggio Calabria
2nd GP Alghero
3rd Coppa Placci
3rd GP Montelupo
6th Milan–San Remo
9th Overall Giro di Sardegna
9th Gent–Wevelgem
9th Milano–Torino
1978
1st Stage 20 Giro d'Italia
1st Road race, National Road Championships
1st Stage 2a Tour de Romandie
1st Milano–Torino
2nd Coppa Agostoni
2nd Giro di Toscana
2nd Giro del Veneto
2nd GP Valsassina
4th Coppa Sabatini
7th Grand Prix of Aargau Canton
7th Giro di Romagna
9th Züri-Metzgete
1979
1st Trofeo Laigueglia
1st Giro di Campania
2nd Tre Valli Varesine
2nd Giro dell'Emilia
2nd Giro dell'Umbria
3rd GP Industria & Artigianato di Larciano
3rd Giro del Friuli
3rd Giro del Lazio
3rd G.P. Camaiore
8th Overall Giro di Puglia
8th Züri-Metzgete
1980
1st Milan–San Remo
1st Stage 22 Giro d'Italia
1st Stage 2 Giro di Puglia
1st Paris–Brussels
1st Giro di Romagna
2nd Giro di Campania
2nd GP Industria & Artigianato di Larciano
2nd G.P. Camaiore
2nd Trofeo Matteotti
2nd Tre Valli Varesine
2nd Giro del Veneto
3rd Giro di Toscana
3rd GP Montelupo
4th Trofeo Laigueglia
5th Coppa Sabatini
6th Giro dell'Emilia
1981
1st Stage 21 Giro d'Italia
1st GP Industria & Artigianato di Larciano
1st Giro dell'Emilia
1st GP Montelupo
2nd Trofeo Laigueglia
2nd Giro di Toscana
2nd Giro del Veneto
3rd Tre Valli Varesine
3rd Giro dell'Umbria
8th Amstel Gold Race
9th Paris–Brussels
10th Milan–San Remo
10th Road race, UCI World Championships
1982
1st Road race, National Road Championships
1st Stage 7 Tour de Suisse
1st Stage 4 Giro di Puglia
1st Tre Valli Varesine
1st Giro del Veneto
1st Giro dell'Emilia
2nd Paris–Tours
2nd Trofeo Pantalica
2nd Coppa Sabatini
2nd GP Industria & Artigianato di Larciano
2nd GP Montelupo
3rd Coppa Agostoni
4th Milano–Torino
9th Road race, UCI World Championships
1983
Giro di Puglia

1st Stages 4 & 5

1st Giro della Provincia di Reggio Calabria
2nd Col San Martino
4th Overall Giro di Sardegna
4th Milano–Torino
7th Gent–Wevelgem
1984
1st Trofeo Pantalica
1st Gran Premio Industria e Commercio di Prato
1st Tre Valli Varesine
1st Giro di Romagna
2nd Coppa Sabatini
3rd Gent–Wevelgem
3rd Züri-Metzgete
3rd Grand Prix of Aargau Canton
3rd G.P. Camaiore
4th Overall Settimana Internazionale Coppi e Bartali
4th Rund um den Henninger Turm
4th Paris–Tours
5th Milano–Torino
5th Paris–Brussels
6th Road race, National Road Championships
9th Trofeo Laigueglia
1985
1st Nice–Alassio
1st GP Industria & Artigianato di Larciano
1st Trofeo Matteotti
2nd Overall Ruota d'Oro
3rd Tre Valli Varesine
3rd Paris–Brussels
4th Tour du Nord-Ouest
7th Züri-Metzgete
8th G.P. Camaiore
9th Coppa Sabatini
10th Giro di Toscana
1986
2nd Trofeo Matteotti
2nd Tre Valli Varesine
3rd Giro di Campania
3rd Gran Premio Industria e Commercio di Prato
3rd Giro dell'Emilia
5th Paris–Brussels
1987
1st Stage 5 Settimana Internazionale Coppi e Bartali
2nd Coppa Bernocchi
2nd Coppa Placci
2nd Giro di Romagna
2nd Coppa Sabatini
3rd Trofeo Laigueglia
3rd Giro dell'Appennino
3rd Giro del Lazio
4th G.P. Camaiore
1988
1st Road race, National Road Championships
1st Coppa Placci
2nd Giro di Romagna
3rd Gran Premio Industria e Commercio di Prato
3rd Tre Valli Varesine
4th G.P. Camaiore
1989
1st Trofeo Laigueglia
1st Gran Premio Industria e Commercio di Prato
4th GP Industria & Artigianato di Larciano
6th G.P. Camaiore
8th Giro di Romagna
10th Giro di Toscana
1990
2nd Overall Ruota d'Oro
1991
2nd Trofeo Matteotti
