= Selle Royal (cycling team) =

Italian cycling team (1977–1978)

Team information
- Registered: Italy
- Founded: 1977
- Disbanded: 1978
- Discipline: Road

Key personnel
- Team manager: Carlo Menicagli

Team name history
- 1977 1978: Selle Royal–Contour–Alan; Selle Royal–Inoxpran

Selle Royal was an Italian professional cycling team that existed from 1977 to 1978.

The team was selected to race in two editions of the Giro d'Italia, where they achieved one stage win.

== Major wins ==
1977
Stage 8b Giro d'Italia, Marino Basso
