= Furzi =

Cycling team (1974-1979)

Team information
- Registered: Italy
- Founded: 1974
- Disbanded: 1979
- Discipline: Road

Key personnel
- Team managers: Carlo Menicagli; Italo Zilioli

Team name history
- 1974 1975 1976 1977–1978 1979: Furzi; Furzi–F.T. Furzi–Vibor; Vibor; CBM Fast–Gaggia

Furzi, also known as Vibor and CBM Fast-Gaggia, was an Italian professional cycling team that existed from 1974 to 1979.

The team competed in 6 consecutive editions of the Giro d'Italia, having entered each year of its existence.

== Major wins ==
1975
Giro di Toscana, Tino Conti
1977
Giro d'Italia

Stage 2b & 22, Luciano Borgognoni
Stage 19, Renato Laghi

1978
Giro d'Italia
Stage 17, Wladimiro Panizza

Young rider classification, Roberto Visentini
