= Magniflex (cycling team) =

Italian cycling team (1973–1981, 1986–1987)

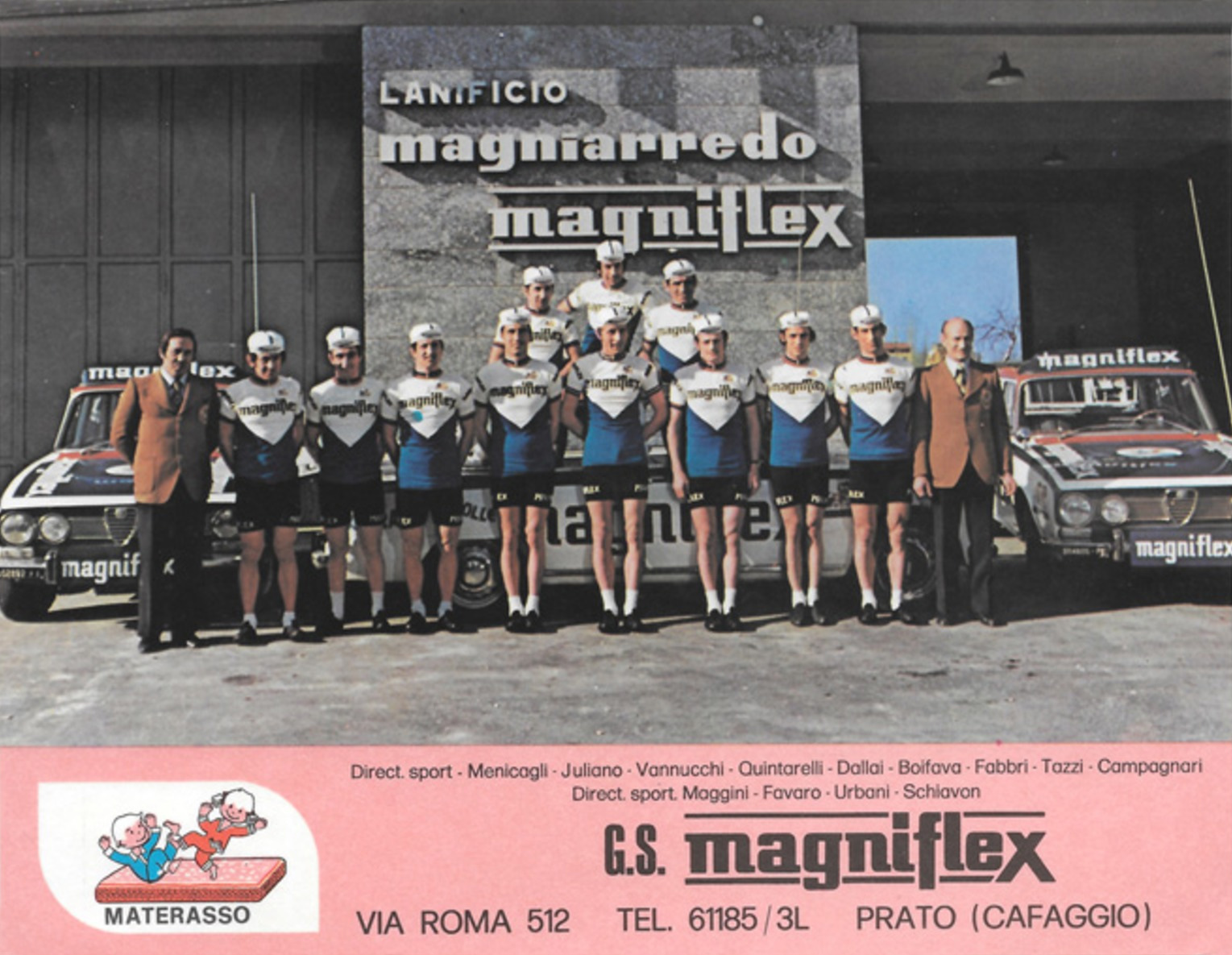
- The Magniflex team of 1973

Team information
- Registered: Italy
- Founded: 1973
- Disbanded: 1987
- Discipline: Road

Team name history
- 1973–1975 1976–1978 1979 1980–1981 1986–1987: Magniflex; Magniflex–Torpado; Magniflex–Famcucine; Magniflex–Olmo; Magniflex–Centroscarpa

Magniflex was an Italian professional cycling team that existed from 1970 to 1996. Its main sponsor was Italian mattress manufacturer Magniflex.

Rossin Bikes was also a co-sponsor and supplied the team bicycles for the 1986-1987 seasons.

The team's major victory was Pierino Gavazzi's win of the 1980 Milan–San Remo.
