= Scic =

Italian professional cycling team (1969-1979)

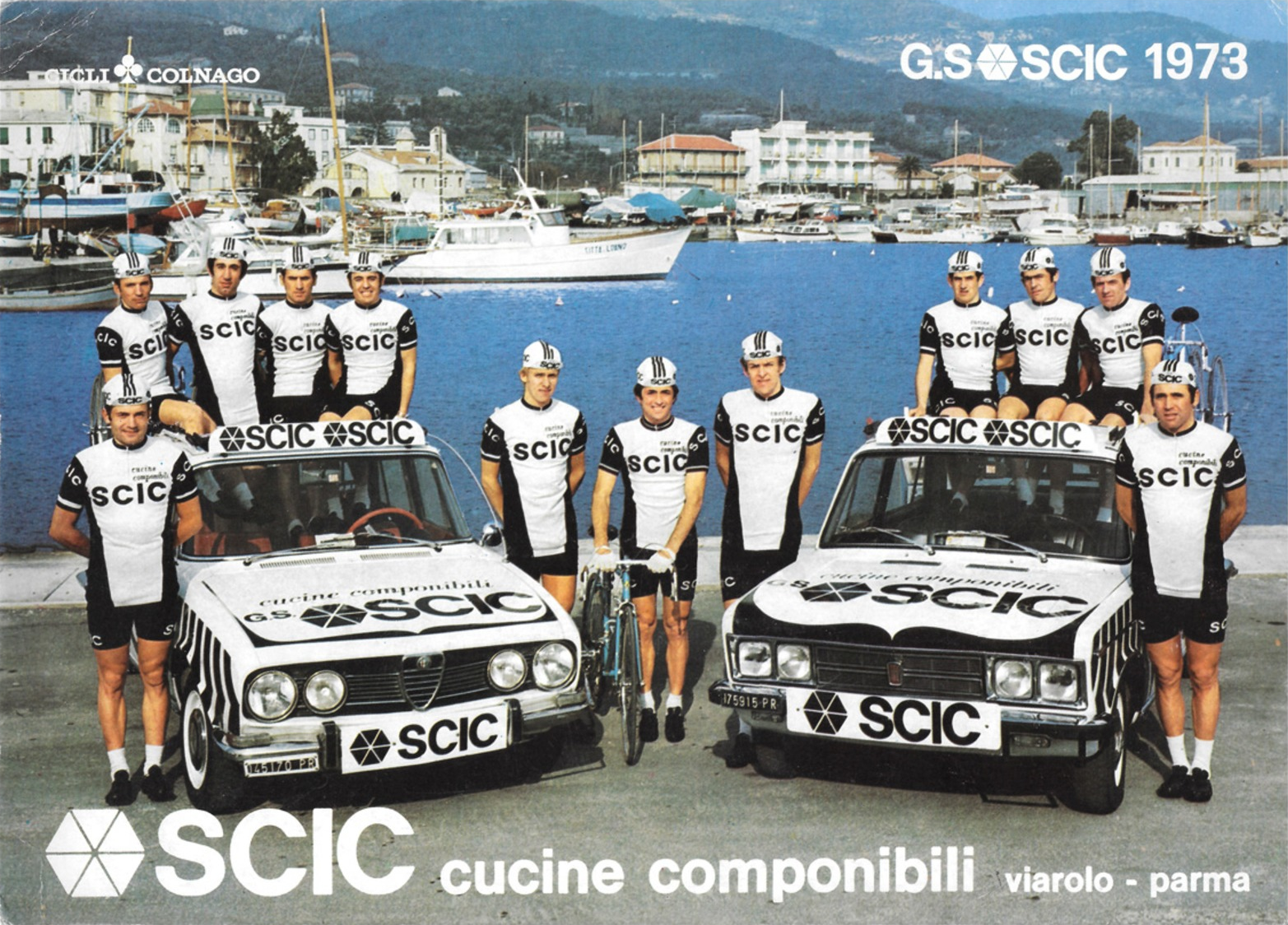
- The Scic team of 1973

Team information
- Registered: Italy
- Founded: 1969
- Disbanded: 1979
- Discipline: Road

Team name history
- 1969–1976 1976 Tour de France 1977 1978–1979: Scic; Scic–Fiat; Scic; Scic–Bottecchia

Scic was an Italian professional cycling team that existed from 1969 to 1979.
