= 1981 Tour de France, Stage 12a to Stage 22 =

Cycling race stages

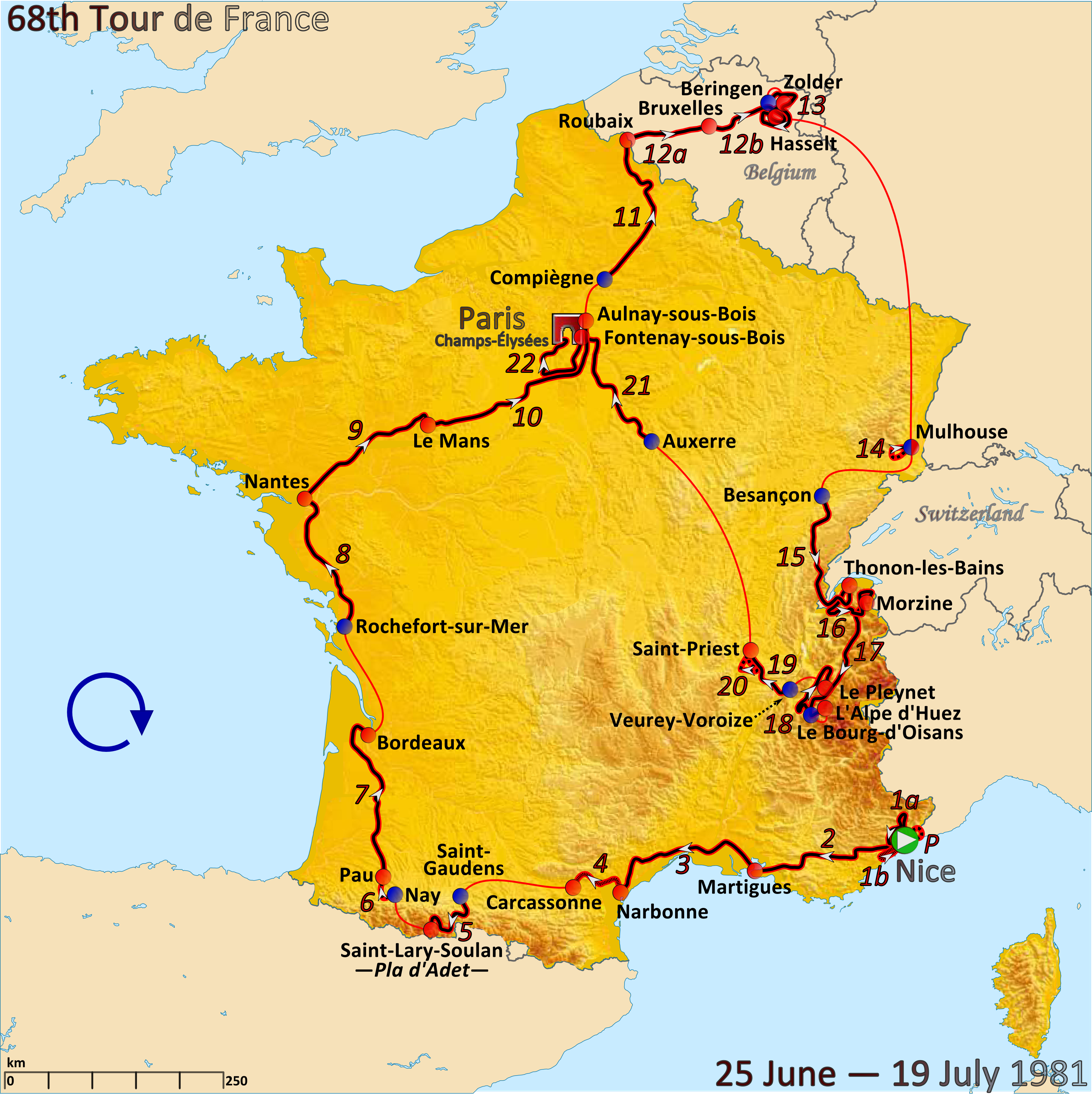
Route of the 1981 Tour de France

The 1981 Tour de France was the 68th edition of Tour de France, one of cycling's Grand Tours. The Tour began in Nice with a prologue individual time trial on 25 June and Stage 12a occurred on 8 July with a flat stage from Roubaix. The race finished on the Champs-Élysées in Paris on 19 July.

== Stage 12a ==
8 July 1981 — Roubaix to Brussels, 107.3 km (66.7 mi)

Stage 12a result

| Rank | Rider | Team | Time |
|---|---|---|---|
| 1 | Freddy Maertens (BEL) | Sunair–Sport 80–Colnago | 2h 25' 48" |
| 2 | Urs Freuler (SUI) | TI–Raleigh–Creda | s.t. |
| 3 | Fons De Wolf (BEL) | Vermeer–Thijs–Gios | s.t. |
| 4 | Guido Van Calster (BEL) | Wickes–Splendor–Europ Decor | s.t. |
| 5 | Daniel Willems (BEL) | Capri Sonne–Koga Miyata | s.t. |
| 6 | Sean Kelly (IRL) | Wickes–Splendor–Europ Decor | s.t. |
| 7 | Noël Dejonckheere (BEL) | Teka | s.t. |
| 8 | Didier Vanoverschelde (FRA) | La Redoute–Motobécane | s.t. |
| 9 | Rudy Pevenage (BEL) | Capri Sonne–Koga Miyata | s.t. |
| 10 | Jos Jacobs (BEL) | Capri Sonne–Koga Miyata | s.t. |

General classification after stage 12a

| Rank | Rider | Team | Time |
|---|---|---|---|
| 1 | Bernard Hinault (FRA) | Renault–Elf–Gitane | 49h 36' 15" |
| 2 | Phil Anderson (AUS) | Peugeot–Esso–Michelin | + 41" |
| 3 | Gilbert Duclos-Lassalle (FRA) | Peugeot–Esso–Michelin | + 3' 33" |
| 4 | Jean-François Rodriguez (FRA) | Renault–Elf–Gitane | + 3' 49" |
| 5 | Michel Laurent (FRA) | Peugeot–Esso–Michelin | + 4' 36" |
| 6 | Ronny Claes (BEL) | Capri Sonne–Koga Miyata | + 5' 41" |
| 7 | Lucien Van Impe (BEL) | Boston–Mavic | + 5' 47" |
| 8 | Gery Verlinden (BEL) | Sunair–Sport 80–Colnago | + 6' 26" |
| 9 | Eddy Schepers (BEL) | DAF Trucks–Côte d'Or–Gazelle | + 6' 45" |
| 10 | Régis Clère (FRA) | Miko–Mercier–Vivagel | + 7' 10" |

== Stage 12b ==
8 July 1981 — Brussels (Belgium) to Circuit Zolder (Belgium), 133.8 km (83.1 mi)

Stage 12b result

| Rank | Rider | Team | Time |
|---|---|---|---|
| 1 | Eddy Planckaert (BEL) | Wickes–Splendor–Europ Decor | 3h 22' 31" |
| 2 | Freddy Maertens (BEL) | Sunair–Sport 80–Colnago | s.t. |
| 3 | Yvon Bertin (FRA) | Renault–Elf–Gitane | s.t. |
| 4 | Guido Van Calster (BEL) | Wickes–Splendor–Europ Decor | s.t. |
| 5 | Jos Jacobs (BEL) | Capri Sonne–Koga Miyata | s.t. |
| 6 | Bernard Hinault (FRA) | Renault–Elf–Gitane | s.t. |
| 7 | Rudy Pevenage (BEL) | Capri Sonne–Koga Miyata | s.t. |
| 8 | Klaus-Peter Thaler (FRG) | Puch–Wolber–Campagnolo | s.t. |
| 9 | William Tackaert (BEL) | DAF Trucks–Côte d'Or–Gazelle | s.t. |
| 10 | Ludo Peeters (BEL) | TI–Raleigh–Creda | s.t. |

General classification after stage 12b

| Rank | Rider | Team | Time |
|---|---|---|---|
| 1 | Bernard Hinault (FRA) | Renault–Elf–Gitane | 52h 58' 46" |
| 2 | Phil Anderson (AUS) | Peugeot–Esso–Michelin | + 41" |
| 3 | Gilbert Duclos-Lassalle (FRA) | Peugeot–Esso–Michelin | + 3' 33" |
| 4 | Jean-François Rodriguez (FRA) | Renault–Elf–Gitane | + 3' 49" |
| 5 | Michel Laurent (FRA) | Peugeot–Esso–Michelin | + 4' 36" |
| 6 | Ronny Claes (BEL) | Capri Sonne–Koga Miyata | + 5' 41" |
| 7 | Lucien Van Impe (BEL) | Boston–Mavic | + 5' 47" |
| 8 | Gery Verlinden (BEL) | Sunair–Sport 80–Colnago | + 6' 26" |
| 9 | Eddy Schepers (BEL) | DAF Trucks–Côte d'Or–Gazelle | + 6' 45" |
| 10 | Régis Clère (FRA) | Miko–Mercier–Vivagel | + 7' 10" |

== Stage 13 ==
9 July 1981 — Beringen (Belgium) to Hasselt (Belgium), 157 km (97.6 mi)

Stage 13 result

| Rank | Rider | Team | Time |
|---|---|---|---|
| 1 | Freddy Maertens (BEL) | Sunair–Sport 80–Colnago | 4h 01' 20" |
| 2 | Eddy Planckaert (BEL) | Wickes–Splendor–Europ Decor | s.t. |
| 3 | Fons De Wolf (BEL) | Vermeer–Thijs–Gios | s.t. |
| 4 | Yvon Bertin (FRA) | Renault–Elf–Gitane | s.t. |
| 5 | Guido Van Calster (BEL) | Wickes–Splendor–Europ Decor | s.t. |
| 6 | William Tackaert (BEL) | DAF Trucks–Côte d'Or–Gazelle | s.t. |
| 7 | Jean-René Bernaudeau (FRA) | Peugeot–Esso–Michelin | s.t. |
| 8 | Sean Kelly (IRL) | Wickes–Splendor–Europ Decor | s.t. |
| 9 | Klaus-Peter Thaler (FRG) | Puch–Wolber–Campagnolo | s.t. |
| 10 | Rudy Pevenage (BEL) | Capri Sonne–Koga Miyata | s.t. |

General classification after stage 13

| Rank | Rider | Team | Time |
|---|---|---|---|
| 1 | Bernard Hinault (FRA) | Renault–Elf–Gitane | 56h 59' 42" |
| 2 | Phil Anderson (AUS) | Peugeot–Esso–Michelin | + 57" |
| 3 | Gilbert Duclos-Lassalle (FRA) | Peugeot–Esso–Michelin | + 3' 57" |
| 4 | Jean-François Rodriguez (FRA) | Renault–Elf–Gitane | s.t. |
| 5 | Ronny Claes (BEL) | Capri Sonne–Koga Miyata | + 6' 05" |
| 6 | Michel Laurent (FRA) | Peugeot–Esso–Michelin | + 6' 06" |
| 7 | Lucien Van Impe (BEL) | Boston–Mavic | + 6' 11" |
| 8 | Gery Verlinden (BEL) | Sunair–Sport 80–Colnago | + 6' 50" |
| 9 | Paul Wellens (BEL) | Sunair–Sport 80–Colnago | + 7' 43" |
| 10 | Eddy Schepers (BEL) | DAF Trucks–Côte d'Or–Gazelle | + 7' 45" |

== Stage 14 ==
10 July 1981 — Mulhouse, 38.5 km (23.9 mi) (ITT)

Stage 14 result

| Rank | Rider | Team | Time |
|---|---|---|---|
| 1 | Bernard Hinault (FRA) | Renault–Elf–Gitane | 50' 30" |
| 2 | Gerrie Knetemann (NED) | TI–Raleigh–Creda | + 25" |
| 3 | Daniel Willems (BEL) | Capri Sonne–Koga Miyata | + 1' 42" |
| 4 | Phil Anderson (AUS) | Peugeot–Esso–Michelin | + 2' 01" |
| 5 | Joaquim Agostinho (POR) | Sem–France Loire–Campagnolo | + 2' 03" |
| 6 | Gery Verlinden (BEL) | Sunair–Sport 80–Colnago | + 2' 06" |
| 7 | Mariano Martínez (FRA) | La Redoute–Motobécane | + 2' 20" |
| 8 | Fons De Wolf (BEL) | Vermeer–Thijs–Gios | + 2' 23" |
| 9 | Johan De Muynck (BEL) | Wickes–Splendor–Europ Decor | + 2' 28" |
| 10 | Bernard Vallet (FRA) | La Redoute–Motobécane | + 2' 29" |

General classification after stage 14

| Rank | Rider | Team | Time |
|---|---|---|---|
| 1 | Bernard Hinault (FRA) | Renault–Elf–Gitane | 57h 52' 12" |
| 2 | Phil Anderson (AUS) | Peugeot–Esso–Michelin | + 2' 58" |
| 3 | Gilbert Duclos-Lassalle (FRA) | Peugeot–Esso–Michelin | + 6' 37" |
| 4 | Jean-François Rodriguez (FRA) | Renault–Elf–Gitane | + 8' 53" |
| 5 | Gery Verlinden (BEL) | Sunair–Sport 80–Colnago | + 4' 36" |
| 6 | Lucien Van Impe (BEL) | Boston–Mavic | + 5' 41" |
| 7 | Ronny Claes (BEL) | Capri Sonne–Koga Miyata | + 5' 47" |
| 8 | Michel Laurent (FRA) | Peugeot–Esso–Michelin | + 6' 26" |
| 9 | Joop Zoetemelk (NED) | TI–Raleigh–Creda | + 6' 45" |
| 10 | Régis Clère (FRA) | Miko–Mercier–Vivagel | + 7' 10" |

== Stage 15 ==
11 July 1981 — Besançon to Thonon-les-Bains, 231 km (144 mi)

Stage 15 result

| Rank | Rider | Team | Time |
|---|---|---|---|
| 1 | Sean Kelly (IRL) | Wickes–Splendor–Europ Decor | 5h 47' 07" |
| 2 | Jean-François Rodriguez (FRA) | Renault–Elf–Gitane | s.t. |
| 3 | Johan van der Velde (NED) | TI–Raleigh–Creda | s.t. |
| 4 | Leo Wellens (BEL) | Sunair–Sport 80–Colnago | s.t. |
| 5 | Jacques Michaud (FRA) | Sem–France Loire–Campagnolo | s.t. |
| 6 | Mariano Martínez (FRA) | La Redoute–Motobécane | s.t. |
| 7 | Vicente Belda (ESP) | Kelme | s.t. |
| 8 | Dominique Arnaud (FRA) | Puch–Wolber–Campagnolo | s.t. |
| 9 | Graham Jones (GBR) | Peugeot–Esso–Michelin | s.t. |
| 10 | Jean-René Bernaudeau (FRA) | Peugeot–Esso–Michelin | s.t. |

General classification after stage 15

| Rank | Rider | Team | Time |
|---|---|---|---|
| 1 | Bernard Hinault (FRA) | Renault–Elf–Gitane | 63h 37' 37" |
| 2 | Phil Anderson (AUS) | Peugeot–Esso–Michelin | + 2' 58" |
| 3 | Gilbert Duclos-Lassalle (FRA) | Peugeot–Esso–Michelin | + 6' 37" |
| 4 | Jean-François Rodriguez (FRA) | Renault–Elf–Gitane | + 8' 35" |
| 5 | Gery Verlinden (BEL) | Sunair–Sport 80–Colnago | + 8' 56" |
| 6 | Lucien Van Impe (BEL) | Boston–Mavic | + 9' 38" |
| 7 | Michel Laurent (FRA) | Peugeot–Esso–Michelin | + 9' 50" |
| 8 | Ronny Claes (BEL) | Capri Sonne–Koga Miyata | + 9' 58" |
| 9 | Joop Zoetemelk (NED) | TI–Raleigh–Creda | + 10' 43" |
| 10 | Daniel Willems (BEL) | Capri Sonne–Koga Miyata | + 11' 24" |

== Stage 16 ==
12 July 1981 — Thonon-les-Bains to Morzine, 200 km (120 mi)

Stage 16 result

| Rank | Rider | Team | Time |
|---|---|---|---|
| 1 | Robert Alban (FRA) | La Redoute–Motobécane | 6h 14' 29" |
| 2 | Sven-Åke Nilsson (SWE) | Wickes–Splendor–Europ Decor | + 2' 22" |
| 3 | Claude Criquielion (BEL) | Wickes–Splendor–Europ Decor | + 3' 51" |
| 4 | Fons De Wolf (BEL) | Vermeer–Thijs–Gios | + 3' 55" |
| 5 | Eddy Schepers (BEL) | DAF Trucks–Côte d'Or–Gazelle | s.t. |
| 6 | Jean-René Bernaudeau (FRA) | Peugeot–Esso–Michelin | s.t. |
| 7 | Johan van der Velde (NED) | TI–Raleigh–Creda | s.t. |
| 8 | Johan De Muynck (BEL) | Wickes–Splendor–Europ Decor | s.t. |
| 9 | Peter Winnen (NED) | Capri Sonne–Koga Miyata | s.t. |
| 10 | Mariano Martínez (FRA) | La Redoute–Motobécane | s.t. |

General classification after stage 16

| Rank | Rider | Team | Time |
|---|---|---|---|
| 1 | Bernard Hinault (FRA) | Renault–Elf–Gitane | 69h 56' 01" |
| 2 | Phil Anderson (AUS) | Peugeot–Esso–Michelin | + 7' 39" |
| 3 | Lucien Van Impe (BEL) | Boston–Mavic | + 9' 38" |
| 4 | Michel Laurent (FRA) | Peugeot–Esso–Michelin | + 9' 50" |
| 5 | Joop Zoetemelk (NED) | TI–Raleigh–Creda | + 10' 43" |
| 6 | Robert Alban (FRA) | La Redoute–Motobécane | + 10' 45" |
| 7 | Johan De Muynck (BEL) | Wickes–Splendor–Europ Decor | + 11' 28" |
| 8 | Eddy Schepers (BEL) | DAF Trucks–Côte d'Or–Gazelle | + 11' 47" |
| 9 | Claude Criquielion (BEL) | Wickes–Splendor–Europ Decor | + 12' 17" |
| 10 | Alberto Fernández (ESP) | Teka | + 12' 18" |

== Stage 17 ==
14 July 1981 — Morzine to Alpe d'Huez, 230 km (140 mi)

Stage 17 result

| Rank | Rider | Team | Time |
|---|---|---|---|
| 1 | Peter Winnen (NED) | Capri Sonne–Koga Miyata | 7h 36' 18" |
| 2 | Bernard Hinault (FRA) | Renault–Elf–Gitane | + 8" |
| 3 | Lucien Van Impe (BEL) | Boston–Mavic | + 9" |
| 4 | Robert Alban (FRA) | La Redoute–Motobécane | + 12" |
| 5 | Johan De Muynck (BEL) | Wickes–Splendor–Europ Decor | + 1' 38" |
| 6 | Joop Zoetemelk (NED) | TI–Raleigh–Creda | + 2' 01" |
| 7 | Claude Criquielion (BEL) | Wickes–Splendor–Europ Decor | + 3' 23" |
| 8 | Paul Wellens (BEL) | Sunair–Sport 80–Colnago | + 3' 33" |
| 9 | Fons De Wolf (BEL) | Vermeer–Thijs–Gios | + 4' 14" |
| 10 | Jean-René Bernaudeau (FRA) | Peugeot–Esso–Michelin | + 4' 16" |

General classification after stage 17

| Rank | Rider | Team | Time |
|---|---|---|---|
| 1 | Bernard Hinault (FRA) | Renault–Elf–Gitane | 77h 32' 27" |
| 2 | Lucien Van Impe (BEL) | Boston–Mavic | + 9' 38" |
| 3 | Robert Alban (FRA) | La Redoute–Motobécane | + 10' 49" |
| 4 | Joop Zoetemelk (NED) | TI–Raleigh–Creda | + 12' 36" |
| 5 | Johan De Muynck (BEL) | Wickes–Splendor–Europ Decor | + 12' 58" |
| 6 | Peter Winnen (NED) | Capri Sonne–Koga Miyata | + 13' 04" |
| 7 | Michel Laurent (FRA) | Peugeot–Esso–Michelin | + 14' 09" |
| 8 | Claude Criquielion (BEL) | Wickes–Splendor–Europ Decor | + 15' 32" |
| 9 | Sven-Åke Nilsson (SWE) | Wickes–Splendor–Europ Decor | + 16' 40" |
| 10 | Paul Wellens (BEL) | Sunair–Sport 80–Colnago | + 17' 40" |

== Stage 18 ==
15 July 1981 — Le Bourg-d'Oisans to Le Pleynet, 134 km (83 mi)

Stage 18 result

| Rank | Rider | Team | Time |
|---|---|---|---|
| 1 | Bernard Hinault (FRA) | Renault–Elf–Gitane | 4h 16' 43" |
| 2 | Jean-René Bernaudeau (FRA) | Peugeot–Esso–Michelin | + 32" |
| 3 | Fons De Wolf (BEL) | Vermeer–Thijs–Gios | + 1' 26" |
| 4 | Marcel Tinazzi (FRA) | Sem–France Loire–Campagnolo | + 2' 33" |
| 5 | Lucien Van Impe (BEL) | Boston–Mavic | s.t. |
| 6 | Mariano Martínez (FRA) | La Redoute–Motobécane | s.t. |
| 7 | Sven-Åke Nilsson (SWE) | Wickes–Splendor–Europ Decor | s.t. |
| 8 | Robert Alban (FRA) | La Redoute–Motobécane | s.t. |
| 9 | Joop Zoetemelk (NED) | TI–Raleigh–Creda | s.t. |
| 10 | Daniel Willems (BEL) | Capri Sonne–Koga Miyata | + 2' 51" |

General classification after stage 18

| Rank | Rider | Team | Time |
|---|---|---|---|
| 1 | Bernard Hinault (FRA) | Renault–Elf–Gitane | 81h 49' 10" |
| 2 | Lucien Van Impe (BEL) | Boston–Mavic | + 12' 12" |
| 3 | Robert Alban (FRA) | La Redoute–Motobécane | + 13' 22" |
| 4 | Joop Zoetemelk (NED) | TI–Raleigh–Creda | + 15' 09" |
| 5 | Johan De Muynck (BEL) | Wickes–Splendor–Europ Decor | + 15' 53" |
| 6 | Peter Winnen (NED) | Capri Sonne–Koga Miyata | + 16' 05" |
| 7 | Claude Criquielion (BEL) | Wickes–Splendor–Europ Decor | + 18' 33" |
| 8 | Jean-René Bernaudeau (FRA) | Peugeot–Esso–Michelin | + 18' 35" |
| 9 | Sven-Åke Nilsson (SWE) | Wickes–Splendor–Europ Decor | + 19' 13" |
| 10 | Fons De Wolf (BEL) | Vermeer–Thijs–Gios | + 21' 20" |

== Stage 19 ==
16 July 1981 — Veurey to Saint-Priest, 117.5 km (73.0 mi)

Stage 19 result

| Rank | Rider | Team | Time |
|---|---|---|---|
| 1 | Daniel Willems (BEL) | Capri Sonne–Koga Miyata | 3h 07' 02" |
| 2 | Bernard Hinault (FRA) | Renault–Elf–Gitane | + 1" |
| 3 | Ludo Peeters (BEL) | TI–Raleigh–Creda | s.t. |
| 4 | Phil Anderson (AUS) | Peugeot–Esso–Michelin | s.t. |
| 5 | Patrick Friou (FRA) | Miko–Mercier–Vivagel | s.t. |
| 6 | Ronny Claes (BEL) | Capri Sonne–Koga Miyata | s.t. |
| 7 | Hubert Linard (FRA) | Peugeot–Esso–Michelin | s.t. |
| 8 | Jean-René Bernaudeau (FRA) | Peugeot–Esso–Michelin | s.t. |
| 9 | Sven-Åke Nilsson (SWE) | Wickes–Splendor–Europ Decor | s.t. |
| 10 | Jacques Michaud (FRA) | Sem–France Loire–Campagnolo | + 2' 51" |

General classification after stage 19

| Rank | Rider | Team | Time |
|---|---|---|---|
| 1 | Bernard Hinault (FRA) | Renault–Elf–Gitane | 84h 55' 45" |
| 2 | Lucien Van Impe (BEL) | Boston–Mavic | + 12' 32" |
| 3 | Robert Alban (FRA) | La Redoute–Motobécane | + 13' 50" |
| 4 | Joop Zoetemelk (NED) | TI–Raleigh–Creda | + 15' 21" |
| 5 | Peter Winnen (NED) | Capri Sonne–Koga Miyata | + 16' 33" |
| 6 | Jean-René Bernaudeau (FRA) | Peugeot–Esso–Michelin | + 18' 59" |
| 7 | Sven-Åke Nilsson (SWE) | Wickes–Splendor–Europ Decor | + 19' 41" |
| 8 | Johan De Muynck (BEL) | Wickes–Splendor–Europ Decor | + 20' 09" |
| 9 | Claude Criquielion (BEL) | Wickes–Splendor–Europ Decor | + 22' 49" |
| 10 | Fons De Wolf (BEL) | Vermeer–Thijs–Gios | + 25' 36" |

== Stage 20 ==
17 July 1981 — Saint-Priest, 46.5 km (28.9 mi) (ITT)

Stage 20 result

| Rank | Rider | Team | Time |
|---|---|---|---|
| 1 | Bernard Hinault (FRA) | Renault–Elf–Gitane | 1h 01' 16" |
| 2 | Daniel Willems (BEL) | Capri Sonne–Koga Miyata | + 37" |
| 3 | Gerrie Knetemann (NED) | TI–Raleigh–Creda | + 1' 03" |
| 4 | Jean-Luc Vandenbroucke (BEL) | La Redoute–Motobécane | + 1' 52" |
| 5 | Lucien Van Impe (BEL) | Boston–Mavic | + 2' 02" |
| 6 | Gilbert Duclos-Lassalle (FRA) | Peugeot–Esso–Michelin | + 2' 33" |
| 7 | Régis Clère (FRA) | Miko–Mercier–Vivagel | + 2' 35" |
| 8 | Marcel Tinazzi (FRA) | Sem–France Loire–Campagnolo | + 2' 46" |
| 9 | Joop Zoetemelk (NED) | TI–Raleigh–Creda | + 3' 00" |
| 10 | Freddy Maertens (BEL) | Sunair–Sport 80–Colnago | + 3' 08" |

General classification after stage 20

| Rank | Rider | Team | Time |
|---|---|---|---|
| 1 | Bernard Hinault (FRA) | Renault–Elf–Gitane | 85h 57' 01" |
| 2 | Lucien Van Impe (BEL) | Boston–Mavic | + 14' 34" |
| 3 | Robert Alban (FRA) | La Redoute–Motobécane | + 17' 04" |
| 4 | Joop Zoetemelk (NED) | TI–Raleigh–Creda | + 18' 21" |
| 5 | Peter Winnen (NED) | Capri Sonne–Koga Miyata | + 20' 26" |
| 6 | Jean-René Bernaudeau (FRA) | Peugeot–Esso–Michelin | + 23' 02" |
| 7 | Johan De Muynck (BEL) | Wickes–Splendor–Europ Decor | + 24' 25" |
| 8 | Sven-Åke Nilsson (SWE) | Wickes–Splendor–Europ Decor | + 24' 37" |
| 9 | Claude Criquielion (BEL) | Wickes–Splendor–Europ Decor | + 26' 18" |
| 10 | Daniel Willems (BEL) | Capri Sonne–Koga Miyata | + 28' 12" |

== Stage 21 ==
18 July 1981 — Auxerre to Fontenay-sous-Bois, 207 km (129 mi)

Stage 21 result

| Rank | Rider | Team | Time |
|---|---|---|---|
| 1 | Johan van der Velde (NED) | TI–Raleigh–Creda | 5h 32' 36" |
| 2 | Pierre Bazzo (FRA) | La Redoute–Motobécane | + 2" |
| 3 | Ludo Peeters (BEL) | TI–Raleigh–Creda | + 19" |
| 4 | Serge Beucherie (FRA) | Sem–France Loire–Campagnolo | s.t. |
| 5 | Phil Anderson (AUS) | Peugeot–Esso–Michelin | s.t. |
| 6 | Bernard Vallet (FRA) | La Redoute–Motobécane | s.t. |
| 7 | Guy Nulens (BEL) | DAF Trucks–Côte d'Or–Gazelle | s.t. |
| 8 | Marcel Tinazzi (FRA) | Sem–France Loire–Campagnolo | s.t. |
| 9 | Ludo Delcroix (BEL) | Capri Sonne–Koga Miyata | s.t. |
| 10 | Hubert Arbès (FRA) | Renault–Elf–Gitane | s.t. |

General classification after stage 21

| Rank | Rider | Team | Time |
|---|---|---|---|
| 1 | Bernard Hinault (FRA) | Renault–Elf–Gitane | 91h 34' 14" |
| 2 | Lucien Van Impe (BEL) | Boston–Mavic | + 14' 34" |
| 3 | Robert Alban (FRA) | La Redoute–Motobécane | + 17' 04" |
| 4 | Joop Zoetemelk (NED) | TI–Raleigh–Creda | + 18' 21" |
| 5 | Peter Winnen (NED) | Capri Sonne–Koga Miyata | + 20' 26" |
| 6 | Jean-René Bernaudeau (FRA) | Peugeot–Esso–Michelin | + 23' 02" |
| 7 | Johan De Muynck (BEL) | Wickes–Splendor–Europ Decor | + 24' 25" |
| 8 | Sven-Åke Nilsson (SWE) | Wickes–Splendor–Europ Decor | + 24' 37" |
| 9 | Claude Criquielion (BEL) | Wickes–Splendor–Europ Decor | + 26' 18" |
| 10 | Phil Anderson (AUS) | Peugeot–Esso–Michelin | + 27' 00" |

== Stage 22 ==
19 July 1981 — Fontenay-sous-Bois to Paris Champs-Élysées, 186 km (116 mi)

Stage 22 result

| Rank | Rider | Team | Time |
|---|---|---|---|
| 1 | Freddy Maertens (BEL) | Sunair–Sport 80–Colnago | 4h 45' 24" |
| 2 | Fons De Wolf (BEL) | Vermeer–Thijs–Gios | s.t. |
| 3 | Klaus-Peter Thaler (FRG) | Puch–Wolber–Campagnolo | s.t. |
| 4 | Phil Anderson (AUS) | Peugeot–Esso–Michelin | s.t. |
| 5 | Jean-Louis Gauthier (FRA) | Miko–Mercier–Vivagel | s.t. |
| 6 | Sean Kelly (IRL) | Wickes–Splendor–Europ Decor | s.t. |
| 7 | Rudy Pevenage (BEL) | Capri Sonne–Koga Miyata | s.t. |
| 8 | Johan van der Velde (NED) | TI–Raleigh–Creda | s.t. |
| 9 | Jos Jacobs (BEL) | Capri Sonne–Koga Miyata | s.t. |
| 10 | Mariano Martínez (FRA) | La Redoute–Motobécane | s.t. |

General classification after stage 22

| Rank | Rider | Team | Time |
|---|---|---|---|
| 1 | Bernard Hinault (FRA) | Renault–Elf–Gitane | 96h 19' 38" |
| 2 | Lucien Van Impe (BEL) | Boston–Mavic | + 14' 34" |
| 3 | Robert Alban (FRA) | La Redoute–Motobécane | + 17' 04" |
| 4 | Joop Zoetemelk (NED) | TI–Raleigh–Creda | + 18' 21" |
| 5 | Peter Winnen (NED) | Capri Sonne–Koga Miyata | + 20' 26" |
| 6 | Jean-René Bernaudeau (FRA) | Peugeot–Esso–Michelin | + 23' 02" |
| 7 | Johan De Muynck (BEL) | Wickes–Splendor–Europ Decor | + 24' 25" |
| 8 | Sven-Åke Nilsson (SWE) | Wickes–Splendor–Europ Decor | + 24' 37" |
| 9 | Claude Criquielion (BEL) | Wickes–Splendor–Europ Decor | + 26' 18" |
| 10 | Phil Anderson (AUS) | Peugeot–Esso–Michelin | + 27' 00" |

== See also ==
1981 Tour de France, Prologue to Stage 11
