= 1981 Tour de France, Prologue to Stage 11 =

Cycling race stages

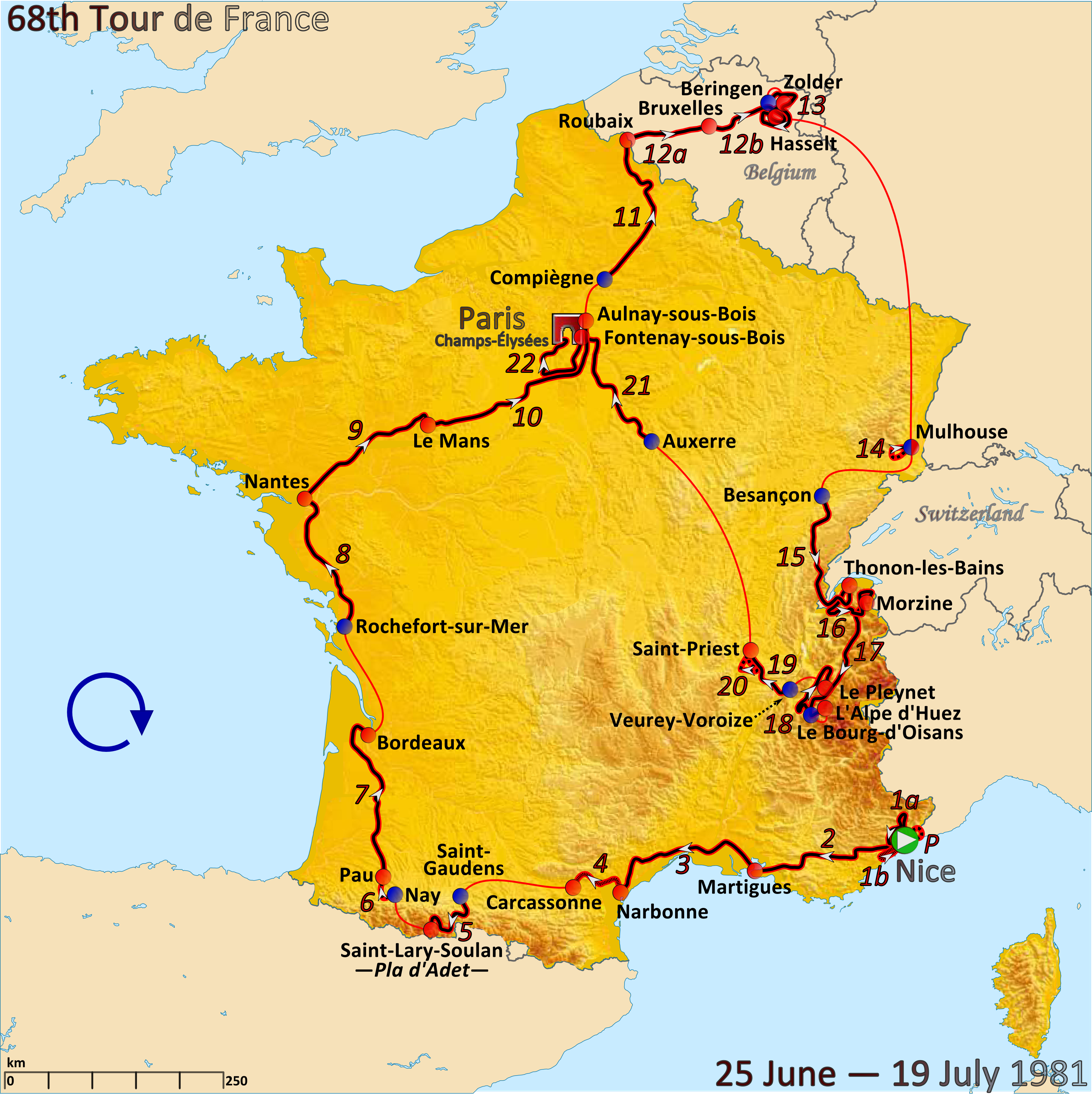
Route of the 1981 Tour de France

The 1981 Tour de France was the 68th edition of Tour de France, one of cycling's Grand Tours. The Tour began in Nice with a prologue individual time trial on 25 June and Stage 12a occurred on 8 July with a flat stage to Brussels, Belgium. The race finished on the Champs-Élysées in Paris on 19 July.

== Prologue ==
25 June 1981 — Nice, 5.85 km (3.6 mi) (ITT)

Prologue result and general classification after prologue

Rank	Rider	Team	Time
1	Bernard Hinault (FRA)	Renault–Elf–Gitane	6' 48.36"
2	Gerrie Knetemann (NED)	TI–Raleigh–Creda	+ 7"
3	Daniel Willems (BEL)	Capri Sonne–Koga Miyata	+ 14"
4	Gilbert Duclos-Lassalle (FRA)	Peugeot–Esso–Michelin	+ 16"
5	Gery Verlinden (BEL)	Sunair–Sport 80–Colnago	s.t.
6	Jean-Luc Vandenbroucke (BEL)	La Redoute–Motobécane	+ 17"
7	Régis Clère (FRA)	Miko–Mercier–Vivagel	s.t.
8	Charly Bérard (FRA)	Renault–Elf–Gitane	+ 19"
9	Yves Hézard (FRA)	Puch–Wolber–Campagnolo	s.t.
10	Ludo Peeters (BEL)	TI–Raleigh–Creda	+ 20"

== Stage 1a ==
26 June 1981 — Nice, 97 km (60.3 mi)

Stage 1a result

Rank	Rider	Team	Time
1	Freddy Maertens (BEL)	Sunair–Sport 80–Colnago	2h 23' 19"
2	Sean Kelly (IRL)	Wickes–Splendor–Europ Decor	s.t.
3	Yvon Bertin (FRA)	Renault–Elf–Gitane	s.t.
4	Rudy Pevenage (BEL)	Capri Sonne–Koga Miyata	s.t.
5	Daniel Willems (BEL)	Capri Sonne–Koga Miyata	s.t.
6	William Tackaert (BEL)	DAF Trucks–Côte d'Or–Gazelle	s.t.
7	Phil Anderson (AUS)	Peugeot–Esso–Michelin	s.t.
8	Jean-Louis Gauthier (FRA)	Miko–Mercier–Vivagel	s.t.
9	Gilbert Duclos-Lassalle (FRA)	Peugeot–Esso–Michelin	s.t.
10	Didier Vanoverschelde (FRA)	La Redoute–Motobécane	s.t.

General classification after stage 1a

Rank	Rider	Team	Time
1	Bernard Hinault (FRA)	Renault–Elf–Gitane	2h 30' 07"
2	Gerrie Knetemann (NED)	TI–Raleigh–Creda	+ 7"
3	Daniel Willems (BEL)	Capri Sonne–Koga Miyata	+ 14"
4	Gilbert Duclos-Lassalle (FRA)	Peugeot–Esso–Michelin	+ 16"
5	Gery Verlinden (BEL)	Sunair–Sport 80–Colnago	s.t.
6	Régis Clère (FRA)	Miko–Mercier–Vivagel	+ 17"
7	Charly Bérard (FRA)	Renault–Elf–Gitane	+ 19"
8	Yves Hézard (FRA)	Puch–Wolber–Campagnolo	s.t.
9	Ludo Peeters (BEL)	TI–Raleigh–Creda	+ 20"
10	Alberto Fernández (ESP)	Teka	+ 22"

== Stage 1b ==
26 June 1981 — Nice, 40 km (24.9 mi) (TTT)

Stage 1b result

Rank	Team	Time
1	TI–Raleigh–Creda	46' 20"
2	Capri Sonne–Koga Miyata	+ 29"
3	Miko–Mercier–Vivagel	+ 40"
4	Renault–Elf–Gitane	+ 43"
5	Sunair–Sport 80–Colnago	+ 50"
6	DAF Trucks–Côte d'Or–Gazelle	+ 51"
7	Peugeot–Esso–Michelin	+ 53"
8	Wickes–Splendor–Europ Decor	+ 1' 10"
9	Sem–France Loire–Campagnolo	+ 1' 55"
10	Vermeer–Thijs–Gios	+ 2' 04"

General classification after stage 1b

Rank	Rider	Team	Time
1	Gerrie Knetemann (NED)	TI–Raleigh–Creda	2h 28' 14"
2	Ludo Peeters (BEL)	TI–Raleigh–Creda	+ 13"
3	Joop Zoetemelk (NED)	TI–Raleigh–Creda	+ 16"
4	Frank Hoste (BEL)	TI–Raleigh–Creda	+ 22"
5	Daniel Willems (BEL)	Capri Sonne–Koga Miyata	+ 27"
6	Ad Wijnands (NED)	TI–Raleigh–Creda	+ 28"
7	Henk Lubberding (NED)	TI–Raleigh–Creda	+ 30"
8	Bernard Hinault (FRA)	Renault–Elf–Gitane	+ 33"
9	Ronny Claes (BEL)	Capri Sonne–Koga Miyata	+ 38"
10	Régis Clère (FRA)	Miko–Mercier–Vivagel	+ 40"

== Stage 2 ==
27 June 1981 — Nice to Martigues, 254 km (157.8 mi)

Stage 2 result

Rank	Rider	Team	Time
1	Johan van der Velde (NED)	TI–Raleigh–Creda	6h 32' 27"
2	Lucien Didier (LUX)	Renault–Elf–Gitane	+ 6"
3	Kim Andersen (DEN)	Miko–Mercier–Vivagel	+ 22"
4	Juan Fernández Martín (ESP)	Kelme	+ 25"
5	Jean Chassang (FRA)	Puch–Wolber–Campagnolo	s.t.
6	Klaus-Peter Thaler (FRG)	Puch–Wolber–Campagnolo	s.t.
7	Rudy Pevenage (BEL)	Capri Sonne–Koga Miyata	s.t.
8	Christian Seznec (FRA)	Miko–Mercier–Vivagel	s.t.
9	Jesús Suárez Cueva (ESP)	Kelme	s.t.
10	Serge Beucherie (FRA)	Sem–France Loire–Campagnolo	s.t.

General classification after stage 2

Rank	Rider	Team	Time
1	Gerrie Knetemann (NED)	TI–Raleigh–Creda	9h 01' 06"
2	Ludo Peeters (BEL)	TI–Raleigh–Creda	+ 13"
3	Joop Zoetemelk (NED)	TI–Raleigh–Creda	+ 16"
4	Daniel Willems (BEL)	Capri Sonne–Koga Miyata	+ 27"
5	Ad Wijnands (NED)	TI–Raleigh–Creda	+ 28"
6	Henk Lubberding (NED)	TI–Raleigh–Creda	+ 30"
7	Bernard Hinault (FRA)	Renault–Elf–Gitane	+ 33"
8	Rudy Pevenage (BEL)	Capri Sonne–Koga Miyata	+ 36"
9	Ronny Claes (BEL)	Capri Sonne–Koga Miyata	+ 38"
10	Régis Clère (FRA)	Miko–Mercier–Vivagel	+ 40"

== Stage 3 ==
28 June 1981 — Martigues to Narbonne, 232.5 km (144.5 mi)

Stage 3 result

Rank	Rider	Team	Time
1	Freddy Maertens (BEL)	Sunair–Sport 80–Colnago	6h 33' 50"
2	Urs Freuler (SUI)	TI–Raleigh–Creda	s.t.
3	Jos Jacobs (BEL)	Capri Sonne–Koga Miyata	s.t.
4	Eddy Planckaert (BEL)	Wickes–Splendor–Europ Decor	s.t.
5	William Tackaert (BEL)	DAF Trucks–Côte d'Or–Gazelle	s.t.
6	Yvon Bertin (FRA)	Renault–Elf–Gitane	s.t.
7	Klaus-Peter Thaler (FRG)	Puch–Wolber–Campagnolo	s.t.
8	Didier Vanoverschelde (FRA)	La Redoute–Motobécane	s.t.
9	Régis Ovion (FRA)	Puch–Wolber–Campagnolo	s.t.
10	Rudy Pevenage (BEL)	Capri Sonne–Koga Miyata	s.t.

General classification after stage 3

Rank	Rider	Team	Time
1	Gerrie Knetemann (NED)	TI–Raleigh–Creda	15h 34' 56"
2	Ludo Peeters (BEL)	TI–Raleigh–Creda	+ 1"
3	Freddy Maertens (BEL)	Sunair–Sport 80–Colnago	+ 15"
4	Joop Zoetemelk (NED)	TI–Raleigh–Creda	+ 16"
5	Ad Wijnands (NED)	TI–Raleigh–Creda	+ 28"
6	Rudy Pevenage (BEL)	Capri Sonne–Koga Miyata	s.t.
7	Henk Lubberding (NED)	TI–Raleigh–Creda	+ 30"
8	Bernard Hinault (FRA)	Renault–Elf–Gitane	+ 33"
9	Régis Clère (FRA)	Miko–Mercier–Vivagel	+ 40"
10	Peter Winnen (NED)	Capri Sonne–Koga Miyata	+ 42"

== Stage 4 ==
29 June 1981 — Narbonne to Carcassonne, 77.2 km (48.0 mi) (TTT)

Stage 4 result

Rank	Team	Time
1	TI–Raleigh–Creda	1h 41' 03"
2	Peugeot–Esso–Michelin	+ 19"
3	Capri Sonne–Koga Miyata	+ 26"
4	Renault–Elf–Gitane	+ 41"
5	DAF Trucks–Côte d'Or–Gazelle	+ 1' 02"
6	Wickes–Splendor–Europ Decor	+ 1' 55"
7	Miko–Mercier–Vivagel	+ 1' 57"
8	Sunair–Sport 80–Colnago	+ 2' 30"
9	La Redoute–Motobécane	+ 2' 56"
10	Sem–France Loire–Campagnolo	+ 3' 22"

General classification after stage 4

Rank	Rider	Team	Time
1	Gerrie Knetemann (NED)	TI–Raleigh–Creda	15h 31' 11"
2	Ludo Peeters (BEL)	TI–Raleigh–Creda	+ 1"
3	Joop Zoetemelk (NED)	TI–Raleigh–Creda	+ 16"
4	Ad Wijnands (NED)	TI–Raleigh–Creda	+ 28"
5	Henk Lubberding (NED)	TI–Raleigh–Creda	+ 30"
6	Rudy Pevenage (BEL)	Capri Sonne–Koga Miyata	+ 1' 43"
7	Peter Winnen (NED)	Capri Sonne–Koga Miyata	+ 1' 57"
8	Jostein Wilmann (NOR)	Capri Sonne–Koga Miyata	+ 2' 01"
9	Phil Anderson (AUS)	Peugeot–Esso–Michelin	s.t.
10	Gilbert Duclos-Lassalle (FRA)	Peugeot–Esso–Michelin	+ 2' 04"

== Stage 5 ==
30 June 1981 — Saint-Gaudens to Pla d'Adet, 117.5 km (73.0 mi)

Stage 5 result

Rank	Rider	Team	Time
1	Lucien Van Impe (BEL)	Boston–Mavic	3h 32' 32"
2	Bernard Hinault (FRA)	Renault–Elf–Gitane	+ 27"
3	Phil Anderson (AUS)	Peugeot–Esso–Michelin	s.t.
4	Alberto Fernández (ESP)	Teka	s.t.
5	Marino Lejarreta (ESP)	Teka	+ 1' 52"
6	Sven-Åke Nilsson (SWE)	Wickes–Splendor–Europ Decor	+ 2' 08"
7	Claude Criquielion (BEL)	Wickes–Splendor–Europ Decor	+ 2' 10"
8	Jos Deschoenmaecker (BEL)	Vermeer–Thijs–Gios	+ 2' 32"
9	Robert Alban (FRA)	La Redoute–Motobécane	+ 2' 37"
10	Raymond Martin (FRA)	Miko–Mercier–Vivagel	s.t.

General classification after stage 5

Rank	Rider	Team	Time
1	Phil Anderson (AUS)	Peugeot–Esso–Michelin	19h 06' 11"
2	Bernard Hinault (FRA)	Renault–Elf–Gitane	+ 17"
3	Jostein Wilmann (NOR)	Capri Sonne–Koga Miyata	+ 3' 08"
4	Peter Winnen (NED)	Capri Sonne–Koga Miyata	+ 3' 24"
5	Ronny Claes (BEL)	Capri Sonne–Koga Miyata	+ 3' 25"
6	Michel Laurent (FRA)	Peugeot–Esso–Michelin	+ 3' 32"
7	Lucien Van Impe (BEL)	Boston–Mavic	+ 3' 39"
8	Jean-François Rodriguez (FRA)	Renault–Elf–Gitane	+ 3' 53"
9	Raymond Martin (FRA)	Teka	s.t.
10	Claude Criquielion (BEL)	Wickes–Splendor–Europ Decor	+ 4' 02"

== Stage 6 ==
1 July 1981 — Nay to Pau, 26.7 km (16.6 mi) (ITT)

Stage 6 result

Rank	Rider	Team	Time
1	Bernard Hinault (FRA)	Renault–Elf–Gitane	15h 31' 11"
2	Gerrie Knetemann (NED)	TI–Raleigh–Creda	+ 1"
3	Phil Anderson (AUS)	Peugeot–Esso–Michelin	+ 16"
4	Gery Verlinden (BEL)	Sunair–Sport 80–Colnago	+ 28"
5	Alain Vigneron (FRA)	Renault–Elf–Gitane	+ 30"
6	Freddy Maertens (BEL)	Sunair–Sport 80–Colnago	+ 1' 43"
7	Fons De Wolf (NED)	Vermeer–Thijs–Gios	+ 1' 57"
8	Alberto Fernández (ESP)	Teka	+ 2' 01"
9	Daniel Willems (BEL)	Capri Sonne–Koga Miyata	s.t.
10	Marcel Laurens (BEL)	DAF Trucks–Côte d'Or–Gazelle	+ 2' 04"

General classification after stage 6

Rank	Rider	Team	Time
1	Bernard Hinault (FRA)	Renault–Elf–Gitane	19h 42' 20"
2	Phil Anderson (AUS)	Peugeot–Esso–Michelin	+ 13"
3	Michel Laurent (FRA)	Peugeot–Esso–Michelin	+ 4' 30"
4	Ronny Claes (BEL)	Capri Sonne–Koga Miyata	+ 4' 52"
5	Lucien Van Impe (BEL)	Boston–Mavic	+ 4' 58"
6	Jostein Wilmann (NOR)	Capri Sonne–Koga Miyata	+ 5' 00"
7	Alberto Fernández (ESP)	Teka	+ 5' 23"
8	Claude Criquielion (BEL)	Wickes–Splendor–Europ Decor	s.t.
9	Peter Winnen (NED)	Capri Sonne–Koga Miyata	+ 5' 44"
10	Gery Verlinden (BEL)	Sunair–Sport 80–Colnago	+ 5' 45"

== Stage 7 ==
2 July 1981 — Pau to Bordeaux, 227 km (141 mi)

Stage 7 result

Rank	Rider	Team	Time
1	Urs Freuler (SUI)	TI–Raleigh–Creda	5h 37' 24"
2	Freddy Maertens (BEL)	Sunair–Sport 80–Colnago	s.t.
3	Eddy Planckaert (BEL)	Wickes–Splendor–Europ Decor	s.t.
4	Noël Dejonckheere (BEL)	Teka	s.t.
5	Yvon Bertin (FRA)	Renault–Elf–Gitane	s.t.
6	William Tackaert (BEL)	DAF Trucks–Côte d'Or–Gazelle	s.t.
=7	Frank Hoste (BEL)	TI–Raleigh–Creda	s.t.
=7	Gerrie Knetemann (NED)	TI–Raleigh–Creda	s.t.
=7	Henk Lubberding (NED)	TI–Raleigh–Creda	s.t.
=7	Ludo Peeters (BEL)	TI–Raleigh–Creda	s.t.

General classification after stage 7

Rank	Rider	Team	Time
1	Bernard Hinault (FRA)	Renault–Elf–Gitane	25h 19' 16"
2	Phil Anderson (AUS)	Peugeot–Esso–Michelin	+ 33"
3	Michel Laurent (FRA)	Peugeot–Esso–Michelin	+ 4' 58"
4	Ronny Claes (BEL)	Capri Sonne–Koga Miyata	+ 5' 20"
5	Lucien Van Impe (BEL)	Boston–Mavic	+ 5' 26"
6	Jostein Wilmann (NOR)	Capri Sonne–Koga Miyata	+ 5' 28"
7	Alberto Fernández (ESP)	Teka	+ 5' 51"
8	Claude Criquielion (BEL)	Wickes–Splendor–Europ Decor	s.t.
9	Gery Verlinden (BEL)	Sunair–Sport 80–Colnago	+ 6' 05"
10	Peter Winnen (NED)	Capri Sonne–Koga Miyata	+ 6' 12"

== Stage 8 ==
3 July 1981 — Rochefort to Nantes, 180 km (110 mi)

Stage 8 result

Rank	Rider	Team	Time
1	Ad Wijnands (NED)	TI–Raleigh–Creda	4h 35' 37"
2	Juan Fernández Martín (ESP)	Kelme	s.t.
3	Freddy Maertens (BEL)	Sunair–Sport 80–Colnago	s.t.
4	Eddy Planckaert (BEL)	Wickes–Splendor–Europ Decor	s.t.
5	Guido Van Calster (BEL)	Wickes–Splendor–Europ Decor	s.t.
6	Klaus-Peter Thaler (FRG)	Puch–Wolber–Campagnolo	s.t.
7	Sean Kelly (IRL)	Wickes–Splendor–Europ Decor	s.t.
8	Jesús Suárez Cueva (ESP)	Kelme	s.t.
9	Yvon Bertin (FRA)	Renault–Elf–Gitane	s.t.
10	Rudy Pevenage (BEL)	Capri Sonne–Koga Miyata	s.t.

General classification after stage 8

Rank	Rider	Team	Time
1	Bernard Hinault (FRA)	Renault–Elf–Gitane	29h 54' 41"
2	Phil Anderson (AUS)	Peugeot–Esso–Michelin	+ 37"
3	Michel Laurent (FRA)	Peugeot–Esso–Michelin	+ 5' 10"
4	Ronny Claes (BEL)	Capri Sonne–Koga Miyata	+ 5' 32"
5	Lucien Van Impe (BEL)	Boston–Mavic	+ 5' 38"
6	Alberto Fernández (ESP)	Teka	+ 6' 03"
7	Claude Criquielion (BEL)	Wickes–Splendor–Europ Decor	s.t.
8	Gery Verlinden (BEL)	Sunair–Sport 80–Colnago	+ 6' 17"
9	Peter Winnen (NED)	Capri Sonne–Koga Miyata	+ 6' 24"
10	Gilbert Duclos-Lassalle (FRA)	Peugeot–Esso–Michelin	+ 6' 27"

== Stage 9 ==
5 July 1981 — Nantes to Le Mans, 194 km (121 mi)

Stage 9 result

Rank	Rider	Team	Time
1	René Martens (BEL)	DAF Trucks–Côte d'Or–Gazelle	4h 23' 09"
2	Régis Clère (FRA)	Miko–Mercier–Vivagel	+ 4"
3	Gilbert Duclos-Lassalle (FRA)	Peugeot–Esso–Michelin	+ 6"
4	Bernard Becaas (FRA)	Renault–Elf–Gitane	s.t.
5	Theo de Rooij (NED)	Capri Sonne–Koga Miyata	s.t.
6	Jean-François Rodriguez (FRA)	Renault–Elf–Gitane	s.t.
7	Patrick Perret (FRA)	Peugeot–Esso–Michelin	s.t.
8	Freddy Maertens (BEL)	Sunair–Sport 80–Colnago	+ 2' 36"
9	Yvon Bertin (FRA)	Renault–Elf–Gitane	s.t.
10	Eugène Urbany (LUX)	Wickes–Splendor–Europ Decor	s.t.

General classification after stage 9

Rank	Rider	Team	Time
1	Bernard Hinault (FRA)	Renault–Elf–Gitane	34h 20' 26"
2	Phil Anderson (AUS)	Peugeot–Esso–Michelin	+ 37"
3	Gilbert Duclos-Lassalle (FRA)	Peugeot–Esso–Michelin	+ 3' 31"
4	Jean-François Rodriguez (FRA)	Renault–Elf–Gitane	+ 3' 40"
5	Michel Laurent (FRA)	Peugeot–Esso–Michelin	+ 5' 10"
6	Régis Clère (FRA)	Miko–Mercier–Vivagel	+ 5' 16"
7	Ronny Claes (BEL)	Capri Sonne–Koga Miyata	+ 5' 32"
8	Lucien Van Impe (BEL)	Boston–Mavic	+ 5' 38"
9	Alberto Fernández (ESP)	Teka	+ 6' 03"
10	Claude Criquielion (BEL)	Wickes–Splendor–Europ Decor	s.t.

== Stage 10 ==
6 July 1981 — Le Mans to Aulnay-sous-Bois, 258.5 km (160.6 mi)

Stage 10 result

Rank	Rider	Team	Time
1	Ad Wijnands (NED)	TI–Raleigh–Creda	6h 30' 41"
2	Jean-Luc Vandenbroucke (BEL)	La Redoute–Motobécane	s.t.
3	William Tackaert (BEL)	DAF Trucks–Côte d'Or–Gazelle	s.t.
4	Régis Ovion (FRA)	Puch–Wolber–Campagnolo	s.t.
5	Philippe Tesnière (FRA)	Boston–Mavic	s.t.
6	Bernard Bourreau (FRA)	Peugeot–Esso–Michelin	s.t.
7	Eddy Schepers (BEL)	DAF Trucks–Côte d'Or–Gazelle	s.t.
8	Michel Laurent (FRA)	Peugeot–Esso–Michelin	s.t.
9	Jonathan Boyer (USA)	Renault–Elf–Gitane	s.t.
10	Henk Lubberding (NED)	TI–Raleigh–Creda	s.t.

General classification after stage 10

Rank	Rider	Team	Time
1	Bernard Hinault (FRA)	Renault–Elf–Gitane	40h 51' 46"
2	Phil Anderson (AUS)	Peugeot–Esso–Michelin	+ 41"
3	Gilbert Duclos-Lassalle (FRA)	Peugeot–Esso–Michelin	+ 3' 35"
4	Jean-François Rodriguez (FRA)	Renault–Elf–Gitane	+ 3' 44"
5	Michel Laurent (FRA)	Peugeot–Esso–Michelin	+ 4' 31"
6	Régis Clère (FRA)	Miko–Mercier–Vivagel	+ 5' 20"
7	Ronny Claes (BEL)	Capri Sonne–Koga Miyata	+ 5' 36"
8	Lucien Van Impe (BEL)	Boston–Mavic	+ 5' 42"
9	Alberto Fernández (ESP)	Teka	+ 6' 07"
10	Claude Criquielion (BEL)	Wickes–Splendor–Europ Decor	s.t.

== Stage 11 ==
7 July 1981 — Compiègne to Roubaix, 246 km (153 mi)

Stage 11 result

Rank	Rider	Team	Time
1	Daniel Willems (BEL)	Capri Sonne–Koga Miyata	6h 18' 34"
2	Gilbert Duclos-Lassalle (FRA)	Peugeot–Esso–Michelin	s.t.
3	Joaquim Agostinho (POR)	Sem–France Loire–Campagnolo	s.t.
4	Christian Seznec (FRA)	Miko–Mercier–Vivagel	+ 5"
5	Paul Sherwen (GBR)	La Redoute–Motobécane	+ 7"
6	Johan van der Velde (NED)	TI–Raleigh–Creda	s.t.
7	Jean-René Bernaudeau (FRA)	Peugeot–Esso–Michelin	s.t.
8	Régis Ovion (FRA)	Puch–Wolber–Campagnolo	s.t.
9	Yvon Bertin (FRA)	Renault–Elf–Gitane	s.t.
10	Ludo Peeters (BEL)	TI–Raleigh–Creda	s.t.

General classification after stage 11

Rank	Rider	Team	Time
1	Bernard Hinault (FRA)	Renault–Elf–Gitane	47h 10' 27"
2	Phil Anderson (AUS)	Peugeot–Esso–Michelin	+ 41"
3	Gilbert Duclos-Lassalle (FRA)	Peugeot–Esso–Michelin	+ 3' 28"
4	Jean-François Rodriguez (FRA)	Renault–Elf–Gitane	+ 3' 44"
5	Michel Laurent (FRA)	Peugeot–Esso–Michelin	+ 4' 31"
6	Ronny Claes (BEL)	Capri Sonne–Koga Miyata	+ 5' 36"
7	Lucien Van Impe (BEL)	Boston–Mavic	+ 5' 42"
8	Gery Verlinden (BEL)	Sunair–Sport 80–Colnago	+ 6' 21"
9	Eddy Schepers (BEL)	DAF Trucks–Côte d'Or–Gazelle	+ 6' 45"
10	Régis Clère (FRA)	Miko–Mercier–Vivagel	+ 7' 05"

== See also ==
1981 Tour de France, Stage 12a to Stage 22
