= 1981 Tour de France =

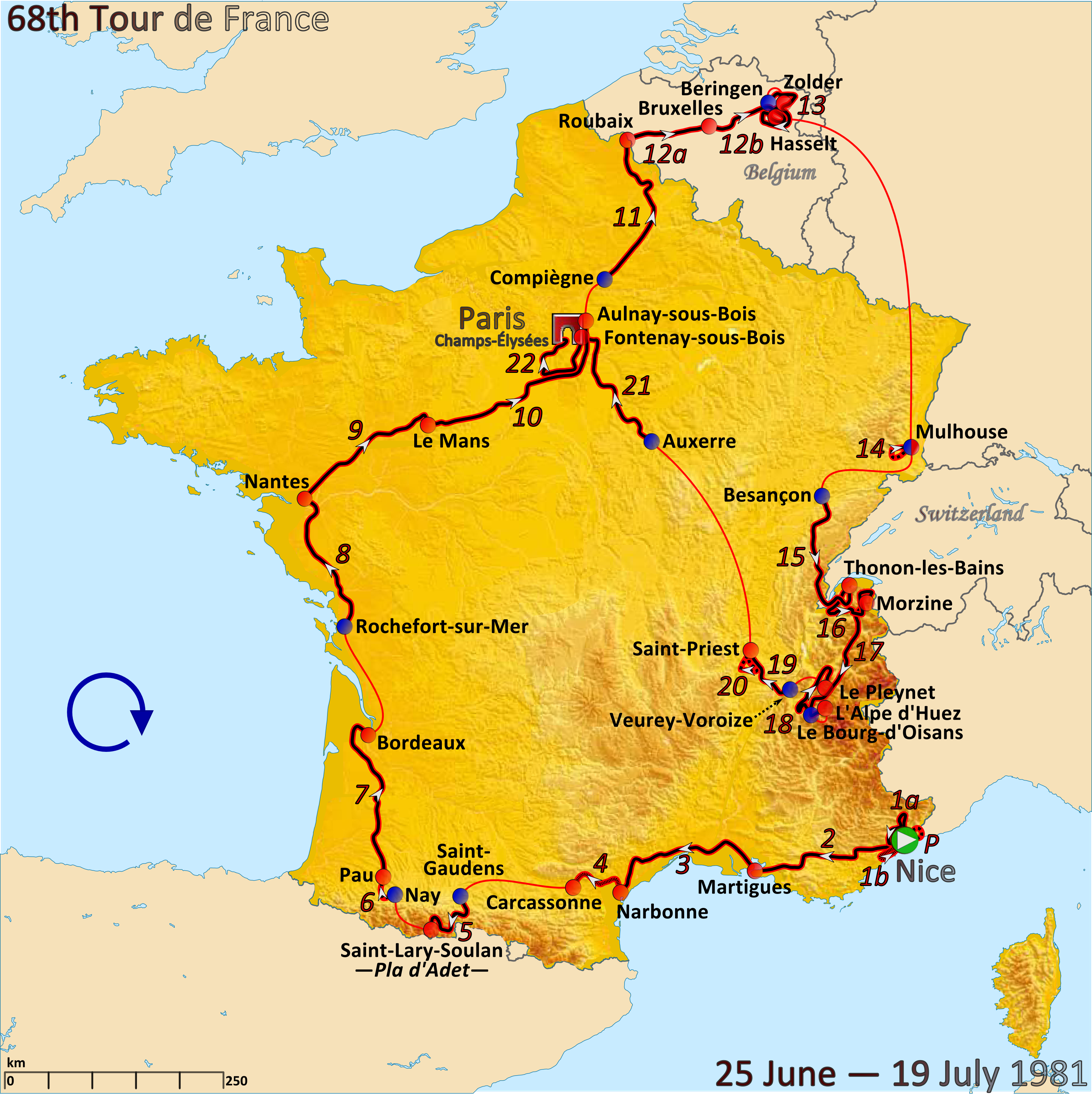
- Route of the 1981 Tour de France

Race details
- Dates: 25 June – 19 July 1981
- Stages: 22 + Prologue, including two split stages
- Distance: 3,753 km (2,332 mi)
- Winning time: 96h 19' 38"

Results
Jersey awarded to the overall winner	Winner	Bernard Hinault (FRA)	(Renault–Elf–Gitane)
	Second	Lucien Van Impe (BEL)	(Boston–Mavic)
	Third	Robert Alban (FRA)	(La Redoute–Motobécane)
Jersey awarded to the points classification winner	Points	Freddy Maertens (BEL)	(Sunair–Sport 80–Colnago)
Jersey awarded to the mountains classification winner	Mountains	Lucien Van Impe (BEL)	(Boston–Mavic)
Jersey awarded to the young rider classification winner	Young rider	Peter Winnen (NED)	(Capri Sonne–Koga Miyata)
	Combination	Bernard Hinault (FRA)	(Renault–Elf–Gitane)
	Sprints	Freddy Maertens (BEL)	(Sunair–Sport 80–Colnago)
	Combativity	Bernard Hinault (FRA)	(Renault–Elf–Gitane)
	Team	Peugeot–Esso–Michelin	
	Team points	Peugeot–Esso–Michelin	

The 1981 Tour de France was the 68th edition of the Tour de France, taking place between 25 June and 19 July. The total race distance was 24 stages over 3,753 km (2,332 mi). It was dominated by Bernard Hinault, who led the race from the sixth stage on, increasing his lead almost every stage. Only Phil Anderson was able to stay close to him, until the 16th stage when he fell behind by about 7:00, and then on the 17th stage he would lose another 17 minutes. In the end only Lucien Van Impe, Robert Alban and Joop Zoetemelk were able to finish inside 20:00 of the now three time champ.

The points classification was won by Freddy Maertens, who did so by winning five stages. The mountains classification was won by Lucien Van Impe, Peter Winnen won the young rider classification, and the Peugeot team won the team classification.

== Teams ==
Late 1980, there were plans to make the tour "open", which meant that amateur teams would also be allowed to join. This would make it possible for teams from Eastern Europe to join. The plan did not materialize, so only professional teams were invited. In January 1981, the organisation decided that there would be 15 teams with 10 cyclists, or 16 teams with 9 cyclists each. At that point, 16 teams had already submitted a request to join, and the organisation was in discussion with four additional Italian teams, and the American national team. In the end, the American team did not apply, and the Italian teams decided to focus on the 1981 Giro d'Italia. The organisation selected 15 teams, who each selected 10 cyclists, for a total of 150 participants.

The teams entering the race were:

- TI–Raleigh–Creda
- Peugeot–Esso–Michelin
- Miko–Mercier–Vivagel
- Splendor–Wickes Bouwmarkt–Europ Decor
- Sem–France Loire–Campagnolo
- La Redoute–Motobécane
- Capri Sonne–Koga Miyata
- Puch–Wolber–Campagnolo
- Boston–Mavic
- Teka–Campagnolo
- DAF Trucks–Côte d'Or
- Kelme–Gios
- Sunair–Sport 80–Colnago
- Renault–Elf–Gitane
- Vermeer Thijs

== Pre-race favourites ==
Bernard Hinault, the winner of the 1978 and 1979 Tour de France and reigning world champion, was the main favourite. His knee problems, that caused him to leave the 1980 Tour de France, were solved, and he was in form: Hinault had won important races in the spring, and he had skipped the 1981 Giro d'Italia to focus on the Tour. His main rivals were 1980 Tour de France winner Joop Zoetemelk, 1976 Tour de France winner Lucien Van Impe and Joaquim Agostinho, although they had never been able to beat Hinault when he was in form, and of these rivals only Zoetemelk was ever able to keep Hinault within striking distance.

Freddy Maertens, the winner of the points classification in the Tour de France in 1976 and 1978, had won only three minor races in 1979 and 1980, but in 1981 he was selected again for the Tour.

== Route and stages ==
The route for the 1981 Tour de France was revealed in December 1980. Originally, the thirteenth stage was planned as a time trial, followed by a transfer of more than 500 km on the same day, with the fourteenth stage the next day as a mountain stage. A few months before the Tour, there were many teams interested in the Tour, and the Tour organisation was afraid that there would not be enough time on 9 July to have the time trial for that many cyclists, followed by the transfer. For this reason, the thirteenth stage was changed into a criterium, and the fourteenth stage became the time trial. The 1981 Tour de France started on 25 June, and had two rest days, in Nantes and Morzine. The highest point of elevation in the race was 2,000 m (6,600 ft) at the summit of the Col de la Madeleine mountain pass on stage 19.

Stage characteristics and winners
Stage	Date	Course	Distance	Type	Winner
P	25 June	Nice	6 km (3.7 mi)	Individual time trial	Bernard Hinault (FRA)
1a	26 June	Nice	97 km (60 mi)	Hilly stage	Freddy Maertens (BEL)
1b	26 June	Nice	40 km (25 mi)	Team time trial	(Netherlands) TI–Raleigh–Creda
2	27 June	Nice to Martigues	254 km (158 mi)	Plain stage	Johan van der Velde (NED)
3	28 June	Martigues to Narbonne	232 km (144 mi)	Plain stage	Freddy Maertens (BEL)
4	29 June	Narbonne to Carcassonne	77 km (48 mi)	Team time trial	(Netherlands) TI–Raleigh–Creda
5	30 June	Saint-Gaudens to Pla d'Adet	117 km (73 mi)	Stage with mountain(s)	Lucien Van Impe (BEL)
6	1 July	Nay to Pau	27 km (17 mi)	Individual time trial	Bernard Hinault (FRA)
7	2 July	Pau to Bordeaux	227 km (141 mi)	Plain stage	Urs Freuler (SUI)
8	3 July	Rochefort to Nantes	182 km (113 mi)	Plain stage	Ad Wijnands (NED)
	4 July	Nantes		Rest day	
9	5 July	Nantes to Le Mans	197 km (122 mi)	Plain stage	René Martens (BEL)
10	6 July	Le Mans to Aulnay-sous-Bois	264 km (164 mi)	Plain stage	Ad Wijnands (NED)
11	7 July	Compiègne to Roubaix	246 km (153 mi)	Plain stage	Daniel Willems (BEL)
12a	8 July	Roubaix to Brussels (Belgium)	107 km (66 mi)	Plain stage	Freddy Maertens (BEL)
12b	8 July	Brussels (Belgium) to Circuit Zolder (Belgium)	138 km (86 mi)	Plain stage	Eddy Planckaert (BEL)
13	9 July	Beringen (Belgium) to Hasselt (Belgium)	157 km (98 mi)	Plain stage	Freddy Maertens (BEL)
14	10 July	Mulhouse	38 km (24 mi)	Individual time trial	Bernard Hinault (FRA)
15	11 July	Besançon to Thonon-les-Bains	231 km (144 mi)	Hilly stage	Sean Kelly (IRE)
16	12 July	Thonon-les-Bains to Morzine	200 km (120 mi)	Stage with mountain(s)	Robert Alban (FRA)
	13 July	Morzine		Rest day	
17	14 July	Morzine to Alpe d'Huez	230 km (140 mi)	Stage with mountain(s)	Peter Winnen (NED)
18	15 July	Le Bourg-d'Oisans to Le Pleynet	134 km (83 mi)	Stage with mountain(s)	Bernard Hinault (FRA)
19	16 July	Veurey to Saint-Priest	118 km (73 mi)	Plain stage	Daniel Willems (BEL)
20	17 July	Saint-Priest	46 km (29 mi)	Individual time trial	Bernard Hinault (FRA)
21	18 July	Auxerre to Fontenay-sous-Bois	207 km (129 mi)	Plain stage	Johan van der Velde (NED)
22	19 July	Fontenay-sous-Bois to Paris (Champs-Élysées)	187 km (116 mi)	Plain stage	Freddy Maertens (BEL)
	Total		3,753 km (2,332 mi)		

== Race overview ==
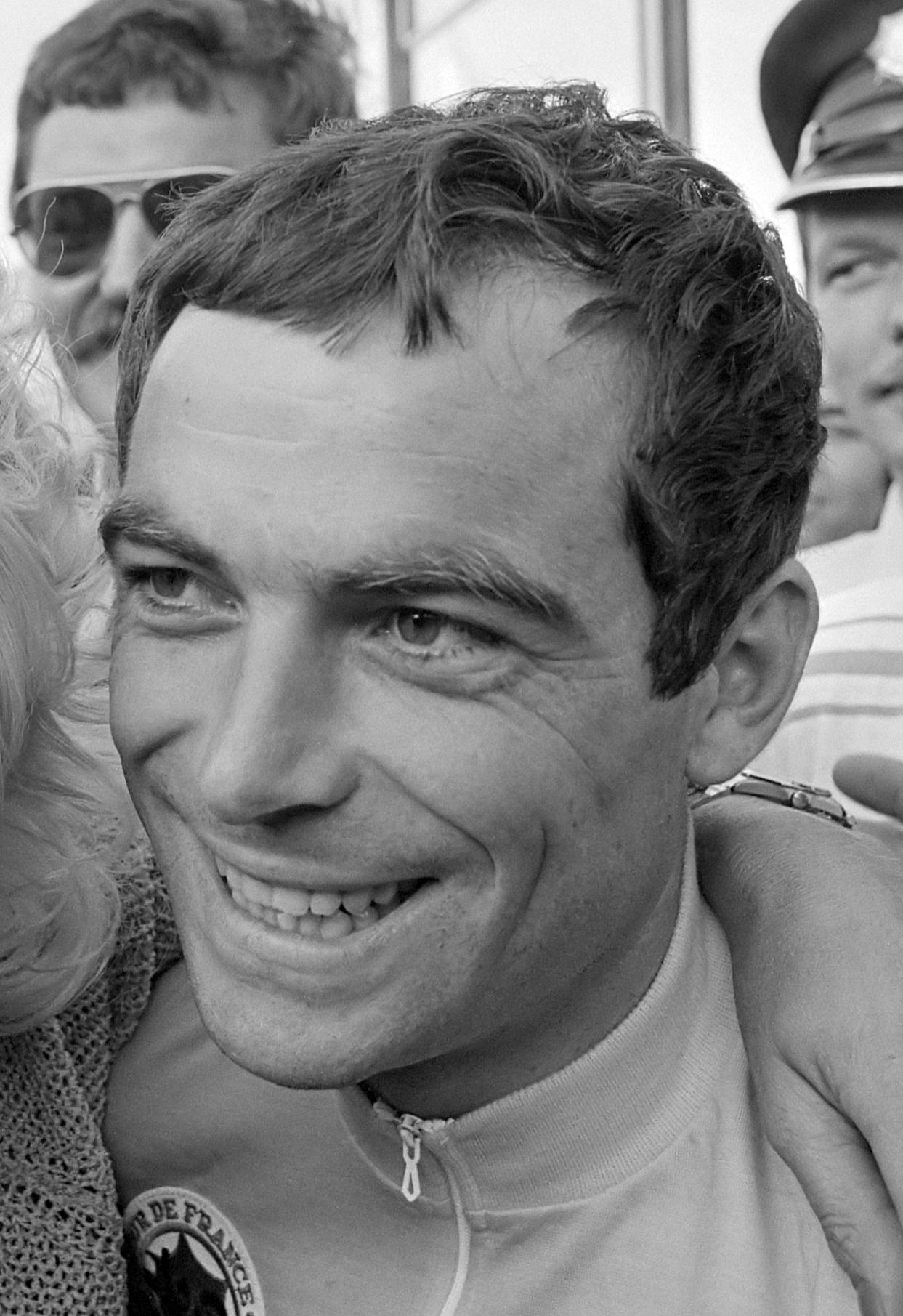
Bernard Hinault (pictured in 1982), winner of the general classification

Hinault started out strong and won the prologue. Freddy Maertens showed he was still able to win sprints by winning the first part of the first stage. The second part was a team time trial, won by TI–Raleigh, which put Gerrie Knetemann in the lead of the race. TI–Raleigh also won the second team time trial in stage four.

The Pyrenees were only briefly visited, in the fifth stage. For the last mountain, Hinault was the lead group, together with Lucien Van Impe and Phil Anderson. Van Impe escaped in the last kilometres and won the stage, 27 seconds ahead of Hinault. Anderson, who finished in third place, became the new leader, the first Australian cyclist to wear the yellow jersey. Anderson had started as domestique for Jean-René Bernaudeau, and nobody was expecting him to be able to follow Hinault. In the time trial of stage six, Hinault won as expected, and became the race leader. Anderson surprised with a third place, and he now followed Hinault by 13 seconds in the general classification.

In the following stages, through Northern France and Belgium, Hinault slowly increased his margin over Anderson by winning amelioration sprints, until leading by 57 seconds after stage 13. In stage 14, Hinault won the time trial, and added two more minutes to the margin.

In the sixteenth stage in the Alps, Anderson was not able to follow anymore. He lost 4 minutes to Hinault, but stayed in second place. Anderson lost this second place in the 17th stage, where he lost 17 minutes, making Van Impe the new second placed cyclist, nine minutes behind. Hinault showed his dominance by winning the eighteenth stage.

The time trial in stage 20 was also won by Hinault, who increased the margin to Van Impe to more than 14 minutes.

=== Doping ===
In the 16th stage, Claude Vincendeau was randomly selected to undergo a doping test. Vincendeau abandoned during that stage, and had already left to his hotel. One of the doctors then went to his hotel to obtain a urine sample, but Vincendeau was unable/unwanting to give it. This counted as a positive test.

== Classification leadership and minor prizes ==
There were several classifications in the 1981 Tour de France, four of them awarding jerseys to their leaders. The most important was the general classification, calculated by adding each cyclist's finishing times on each stage. The cyclist with the least accumulated time was the race leader, identified by the yellow jersey; the winner of this classification is considered the winner of the Tour. The time bonus for stage winners had been absent in the years before, but it returned in 1981; 30, 20 and 10 seconds for the first three cyclists in every stage.

Additionally, there was a points classification, were cyclists got points for finishing among the best in a stage finish, or in intermediate sprints. The cyclist with the most points lead the classification, and was identified with a green jersey.

There was also a mountains classification. The organisation had categorised some climbs as either hors catégorie, first, second, third, or fourth-category; points for this classification were won by the first cyclists that reached the top of these climbs first, with more points available for the higher-categorised climbs. The cyclist with the most points lead the classification, and wore a white jersey with red polka dots.

Another classification was the young rider classification. This was decided the same way as the general classification, but only cyclists younger than 24 were eligible, and the leader wore a white jersey.

The fifth individual classification was the intermediate sprints classification. This classification had similar rules as the points classification, but only points were awarded on intermediate sprints. In 1981, this classification had no associated jersey.

For the team classification, the times of the best three cyclists per team on each stage were added; the leading team was the team with the lowest total time. The riders in the team that led this classification were identified by yellow caps. There was also a team points classification. Cyclists received points according to their finishing position on each stage, with the first rider receiving one point. The first three finishers of each team had their points combined, and the team with the fewest points led the classification. The riders of the team leading this classification wore green caps.

In addition, there was a combativity award given after each mass-start stage to the cyclist considered most combative. The split stages each had a combined winner. The decision was made by a jury composed of journalists who gave points. The cyclist with the most points from votes in all stages led the combativity classification. Bernard Hinault won this classification, and was given overall the super-combativity award. The Souvenir Henri Desgrange was given in honour of Tour founder Henri Desgrange to the first rider to pass a point in the Landes forest 42 km (26 mi) before the end of stage 7 in Bordeaux. This prize was won by Theo de Rooij.

Classification leadership by stage
Stage	Stage winner	General classification	Points classification	Mountains classification	Young rider classification	Combination classification	Intermediate sprints classification	Team classifications		Combativity award
Stage	Stage winner	General classification	Points classification	Mountains classification	Young rider classification	Combination classification	Intermediate sprints classification	By time	By points	Combativity award
P	Bernard Hinault	Bernard Hinault	Bernard Hinault	no award	Theo de Rooij	Bernard Hinault	no award	Renault–Elf–Gitane	TI–Raleigh–Creda	not awarded
1a	Freddy Maertens	Bernard Hinault	Rudy Pevenage	Charly Bérard	Phil Anderson	Bernard Hinault	Rudy Pevenage	Renault–Elf–Gitane	Renault–Elf–Gitane	Jean-René Bernaudeau
1b	TI–Raleigh–Creda	Gerrie Knetemann	Rudy Pevenage	Charly Bérard	Ad Wijnands	Bernard Hinault	Rudy Pevenage	TI–Raleigh–Creda	Renault–Elf–Gitane	not awarded
2	Johan van der Velde	Gerrie Knetemann	Rudy Pevenage	Bernard Hinault	Ad Wijnands	Bernard Hinault	Rudy Pevenage	TI–Raleigh–Creda	Miko–Mercier–Vivagel	Gilbert Duclos-Lassalle
3	Freddy Maertens	Gerrie Knetemann	Freddy Maertens	Bernard Hinault	Ad Wijnands	Phil Anderson	Rudy Pevenage	TI–Raleigh–Creda	Capri Sonne–Koga Miyata	Willy Teirlinck
4	TI–Raleigh–Creda	Gerrie Knetemann	Freddy Maertens	Bernard Hinault	Ad Wijnands	Daniel Willems	Rudy Pevenage	TI–Raleigh–Creda	Capri Sonne–Koga Miyata	not awarded
5	Lucien Van Impe	Phil Anderson	Freddy Maertens	Bernard Hinault	Phil Anderson	Phil Anderson	Freddy Maertens	Renault–Elf–Gitane	Capri Sonne–Koga Miyata	Bernard Hinault
6	Bernard Hinault	Bernard Hinault	Freddy Maertens	Bernard Hinault	Phil Anderson	Bernard Hinault	Freddy Maertens	Renault–Elf–Gitane	Renault–Elf–Gitane	not awarded
7	Urs Freuler	Bernard Hinault	Freddy Maertens	Bernard Hinault	Phil Anderson	Bernard Hinault	Freddy Maertens	Renault–Elf–Gitane	Renault–Elf–Gitane	Jean-François Pescheux
8	Ad Wijnands	Bernard Hinault	Freddy Maertens	Bernard Hinault	Phil Anderson	Bernard Hinault	Freddy Maertens	Renault–Elf–Gitane	Capri Sonne–Koga Miyata	Eddy Verstraeten
9	René Martens	Bernard Hinault	Freddy Maertens	Bernard Hinault	Phil Anderson	Bernard Hinault	Freddy Maertens	Renault–Elf–Gitane	Peugeot–Esso–Michelin	Patrick Perret
10	Ad Wijnands	Bernard Hinault	Freddy Maertens	Bernard Hinault	Phil Anderson	Bernard Hinault	Freddy Maertens	Renault–Elf–Gitane	Peugeot–Esso–Michelin	Régis Ovion
11	Daniel Willems	Bernard Hinault	Freddy Maertens	Bernard Hinault	Phil Anderson	Bernard Hinault	Freddy Maertens	Renault–Elf–Gitane	Peugeot–Esso–Michelin	Serge Beucherie
12a	Freddy Maertens	Bernard Hinault	Freddy Maertens	Bernard Hinault	Phil Anderson	Bernard Hinault	Freddy Maertens	Renault–Elf–Gitane	Peugeot–Esso–Michelin	Daniel Willems
12b	Eddy Planckaert	Bernard Hinault	Freddy Maertens	Bernard Hinault	Phil Anderson	Bernard Hinault	Freddy Maertens	Renault–Elf–Gitane	Peugeot–Esso–Michelin	Daniel Willems
13	Freddy Maertens	Bernard Hinault	Freddy Maertens	Bernard Hinault	Phil Anderson	Bernard Hinault	Freddy Maertens	Renault–Elf–Gitane	Peugeot–Esso–Michelin	Rudy Pevenage
14	Bernard Hinault	Bernard Hinault	Freddy Maertens	Bernard Hinault	Phil Anderson	Bernard Hinault	Freddy Maertens	Renault–Elf–Gitane	Peugeot–Esso–Michelin	not awarded
15	Sean Kelly	Bernard Hinault	Freddy Maertens	Bernard Hinault	Phil Anderson	Bernard Hinault	Freddy Maertens	Renault–Elf–Gitane	Peugeot–Esso–Michelin	Pierre Bazzo
16	Robert Alban	Bernard Hinault	Freddy Maertens	Lucien Van Impe	Phil Anderson	Bernard Hinault	Freddy Maertens	Peugeot–Esso–Michelin	Peugeot–Esso–Michelin	Hubert Linard
17	Peter Winnen	Bernard Hinault	Freddy Maertens	Lucien Van Impe	Peter Winnen	Bernard Hinault	Freddy Maertens	Peugeot–Esso–Michelin	Peugeot–Esso–Michelin	Dominique Arnaud
18	Bernard Hinault	Bernard Hinault	Freddy Maertens	Lucien Van Impe	Peter Winnen	Bernard Hinault	Freddy Maertens	Peugeot–Esso–Michelin	Peugeot–Esso–Michelin	Juan Fernández Martín
19	Daniel Willems	Bernard Hinault	Freddy Maertens	Lucien Van Impe	Peter Winnen	Bernard Hinault	Freddy Maertens	Peugeot–Esso–Michelin	Peugeot–Esso–Michelin	Phil Anderson
20	Bernard Hinault	Bernard Hinault	Freddy Maertens	Lucien Van Impe	Peter Winnen	Bernard Hinault	Freddy Maertens	Peugeot–Esso–Michelin	Peugeot–Esso–Michelin	not awarded
21	Johan van der Velde	Bernard Hinault	Freddy Maertens	Lucien Van Impe	Peter Winnen	Bernard Hinault	Freddy Maertens	Peugeot–Esso–Michelin	Peugeot–Esso–Michelin	Gerrie Knetemann
22	Freddy Maertens	Bernard Hinault	Freddy Maertens	Lucien Van Impe	Peter Winnen	Bernard Hinault	Freddy Maertens	Peugeot–Esso–Michelin	Peugeot–Esso–Michelin	Dominique Arnaud
Final		Bernard Hinault	Freddy Maertens	Lucien Van Impe	Peter Winnen	Bernard Hinault	Freddy Maertens	Peugeot–Esso–Michelin	Peugeot–Esso–Michelin	Bernard Hinault

== Final standings ==
Legend
A yellow jersey.	Denotes the winner of the general classification	A green jersey.	Denotes the winner of the points classification
A white jersey with red polka dots.	Denotes the winner of the mountains classification	A white jersey.	Denotes the winner of the young rider classification

=== General classification ===
Final general classification (1–10)
Rank	Rider	Team	Time
1	Bernard Hinault (FRA)	Renault–Elf–Gitane	96h 19' 38"
2	Lucien Van Impe (BEL)	Boston–Mavic	+ 14' 34"
3	Robert Alban (FRA)	La Redoute–Motobécane	+ 17' 04"
4	Joop Zoetemelk (NED)	TI–Raleigh–Creda	+ 18' 21"
5	Peter Winnen (NED)	Capri Sonne–Koga Miyata	+ 20' 26"
6	Jean-René Bernaudeau (FRA)	Peugeot–Esso–Michelin	+ 23' 02"
7	Johan De Muynck (BEL)	Splendor–Wickes Bouwmarkt–Europ Decor	+ 24' 25"
8	Sven-Åke Nilsson (SWE)	Splendor–Wickes Bouwmarkt–Europ Decor	+ 24' 37"
9	Claude Criquielion (BEL)	Splendor–Wickes Bouwmarkt–Europ Decor	+ 26' 18"
10	Phil Anderson (AUS)	Peugeot–Esso–Michelin	+ 27' 00"

Final general classification (11–121)
Rank	Rider	Team	Time
11	Alfons De Wolf (BEL)	Vermeer Thijs	+ 28' 53"
12	Johan van der Velde (NED)	TI–Raleigh–Creda	+ 29' 46"
13	Marcel Tinazzi (FRA)	Sem–France Loire–Campagnolo	+ 30' 03"
14	Paul Wellens (BEL)	Sunair–Sport 80–Colnago	+ 32' 09"
15	Mariano Martínez (FRA)	La Redoute–Motobécane	+ 32' 16"
16	Eddy Schepers (BEL)	DAF Trucks–Côte d'Or	+ 33' 27"
17	Raymond Martin (FRA)	Miko–Mercier–Vivagel	+ 33' 41"
18	Michel Laurent (FRA)	Peugeot–Esso–Michelin	+ 34' 41"
19	Jean-François Rodriguez (FRA)	Renault–Elf–Gitane	+ 38' 32"
20	Graham Jones (GBR)	Peugeot–Esso–Michelin	+ 41' 06"
21	Alberto Fernández (ESP)	Teka–Campagnolo	+ 42' 27"
22	Lucien Didier (LUX)	Renault–Elf–Gitane	+ 49' 26"
23	Jacques Michaud (FRA)	Sem–France Loire–Campagnolo	+ 50' 23"
24	Dominique Arnaud (FRA)	Puch–Wolber–Campagnolo	+ 52' 15"
25	Géry Verlinden (BEL)	Sunair–Sport 80–Colnago	+ 52' 48"
26	Didier Vanoverschelde (FRA)	La Redoute–Motobécane	+ 53' 13"
27	Charly Berard (FRA)	Renault–Elf–Gitane	+ 56' 06"
28	Gilbert Duclos-Lassalle (FRA)	Peugeot–Esso–Michelin	+ 56' 37"
29	Régis Ovion (FRA)	Puch–Wolber–Campagnolo	+ 56' 43"
30	Hennie Kuiper (NED)	DAF Trucks–Côte d'Or	+ 57' 21"
31	Pierre Bazzo (FRA)	La Redoute–Motobécane	+ 58' 00"
32	Jonathan Boyer (USA)	Renault–Elf–Gitane	+ 59' 21"
33	Serge Beucherie (FRA)	Sem–France Loire–Campagnolo	+ 1h 01' 40"
34	Jostein Wilmann (NOR)	Capri Sonne–Koga Miyata	+ 1h 02' 46"
35	Marino Lejarreta (ESP)	Teka–Campagnolo	+ 1h 10' 37"
36	Christian Seznec (FRA)	Miko–Mercier–Vivagel	+ 1h 12' 43"
37	Bernard Thévenet (FRA)	Puch–Wolber–Campagnolo	+ 1h 12' 48"
38	Vicente Belda (ESP)	Kelme–Gios	+ 1h 14' 23"
39	Theo de Rooij (NED)	Capri Sonne–Koga Miyata	+ 1h 16' 02"
40	Ronny Claes (BEL)	Capri Sonne–Koga Miyata	+ 1h 17' 08"
41	Alain Meslet (FRA)	Boston–Mavic	+ 1h 18' 38"
42	Jordi (Jorge) Fortia (ESP)	Kelme–Gios	+ 1h 23' 28"
43	Alain Vigneron (FRA)	Renault–Elf–Gitane	+ 1h 24' 52"
44	Patrick Perret (FRA)	Peugeot–Esso–Michelin	+ 1h 25' 55"
45	Bernard Vallet (FRA)	La Redoute–Motobécane	+ 1h 26' 10"
46	Hubert Linard (FRA)	Peugeot–Esso–Michelin	+ 1h 26' 12"
47	Patrick Friou (FRA)	Miko–Mercier–Vivagel	+ 1h 27' 20"
48	Sean Kelly (IRE)	Splendor–Wickes Bouwmarkt–Europ Decor	+ 1h 28' 24"
49	Klaus-Peter Thaler (FRG)	Puch–Wolber–Campagnolo	+ 1h 28' 51"
50	Juan Fernández (ESP)	Kelme–Gios	+ 1h 30' 46"
51	Régis Clère (FRA)	Miko–Mercier–Vivagel	+ 1h 31' 01"
52	Guy Nulens (BEL)	DAF Trucks–Côte d'Or	+ 1h 33' 39"
53	Alain De Carvalho (FRA)	Puch–Wolber–Campagnolo	+ 1h 35' 25"
54	Henk Lubberding (NED)	TI–Raleigh–Creda	+ 1h 37' 43"
55	Gerrie Knetemann (NED)	TI–Raleigh–Creda	+ 1h 39' 54"
56	Maurice Le Guilloux (FRA)	Renault–Elf–Gitane	+ 1h 41' 25"
57	Hendrik Devos (BEL)	DAF Trucks–Côte d'Or	+ 1h 42' 05"
58	Jean-Louis Gauthier (FRA)	Miko–Mercier–Vivagel	+ 1h 42' 12"
59	Ludo Peeters (BEL)	TI–Raleigh–Creda	+ 1h 43' 05"
60	Hubert Arbès (FRA)	Renault–Elf–Gitane	+ 1h 43' 45"
61	Roger Legeay (FRA)	Peugeot–Esso–Michelin	+ 1h 43' 56"
62	Ronald De Witte (BEL)	Sunair–Sport 80–Colnago	+ 1h 44' 07"
63	Jacques Bossis (FRA)	Peugeot–Esso–Michelin	+ 1h 44' 39"
64	Ismael Lejarreta (ESP)	Teka–Campagnolo	+ 1h 44' 49"
65	Rudy Colman (BEL)	Splendor–Wickes Bouwmarkt–Europ Decor	+ 1h 46' 53"
66	Freddy Maertens (BEL)	Sunair–Sport 80–Colnago	+ 1h 47' 34"
67	Jos De Schoenmaecker (BEL)	Vermeer Thijs	+ 1h 47' 54"
68	Bernard Becaas (FRA)	Renault–Elf–Gitane	+ 1h 48' 05"
69	Bernardo Alfonsel (ESP)	Teka–Campagnolo	+ 1h 49' 11"
70	Jean Chassang (FRA)	Puch–Wolber–Campagnolo	+ 1h 50' 34"
71	Yves Hézard (FRA)	Puch–Wolber–Campagnolo	+ 1h 52' 15"
72	Bernard Bourreau (FRA)	Peugeot–Esso–Michelin	+ 1h 56' 32"
73	Hubert Mathis (FRA)	Miko–Mercier–Vivagel	+ 1h 58' 29"
74	Ludo Delcroix (BEL)	Capri Sonne–Koga Miyata	+ 1h 59' 59"
75	Rudy Pevenage (BEL)	Capri Sonne–Koga Miyata	+ 2h 00' 34"
76	Louis Luyten (BEL)	Vermeer Thijs	+ 2h 02' 01"
77	Christian Levavasseur (FRA)	Miko–Mercier–Vivagel	+ 2h 02' 36"
78	Patrick Moerlen (SUI)	Sem–France Loire–Campagnolo	+ 2h 03' 20"
79	Herman Beysens (BEL)	Vermeer Thijs	+ 2h 03' 25"
80	Hennie Stamsnijder (NED)	DAF Trucks–Côte d'Or	+ 2h 05' 31"
81	Adrie van Houwelingen (NED)	Vermeer Thijs	+ 2h 06' 20"
82	Jean-Luc Vandenbroucke (BEL)	La Redoute–Motobécane	+ 2h 07' 14"
83	René Martens (BEL)	DAF Trucks–Côte d'Or	+ 2h 07' 41"
84	Jos Jacobs (BEL)	Capri Sonne–Koga Miyata	+ 2h 08' 21"
85	Yvon Bertin (FRA)	Renault–Elf–Gitane	+ 2h 10' 08"
86	Joël Gallopin (FRA)	Miko–Mercier–Vivagel	+ 2h 10' 22"
87	Roger De Cnijf (BEL)	Boston–Mavic	+ 2h 10' 47"
88	Jean-François Pescheux (FRA)	La Redoute–Motobécane	+ 2h 12' 04"
89	Franky De Gendt (BEL)	Vermeer Thijs	+ 2h 12' 42"
90	Patrick Hosotte (FRA)	Sem–France Loire–Campagnolo	+ 2h 12' 49"
91	Paulinho Martinez (ESP)	Teka–Campagnolo	+ 2h 13' 12"
92	Marc Durant (FRA)	La Redoute–Motobécane	+ 2h 13' 51"
93	William Tackaert (BEL)	DAF Trucks–Côte d'Or	+ 2h 21' 50"
94	Frits Pirard (NED)	Sunair–Sport 80–Colnago	+ 2h 23' 40"
95	Frank Hoste (BEL)	TI–Raleigh–Creda	+ 2h 23' 56"
96	Eugène Urbany (LUX)	Splendor–Wickes Bouwmarkt–Europ Decor	+ 2h 25' 01"
97	Jesús Guzmán (ESP)	Kelme–Gios	+ 2h 25' 38"
98	Jean-Paul Hosotte (FRA)	Sem–France Loire–Campagnolo	+ 2h 28' 09"
99	Ferdi Van Den Haute (BEL)	La Redoute–Motobécane	+ 2h 28' 11"
100	Jaime Vilamajo (ESP)	Kelme–Gios	+ 2h 29' 41"
101	Eulalio García (ESP)	Teka–Campagnolo	+ 2h 30' 43"
102	Leo Wellens (BEL)	Sunair–Sport 80–Colnago	+ 2h 30' 46"
103	Francisco Ramon Albelda (ESP)	Kelme–Gios	+ 2h 33' 54"
104	Manuel (Imanol) Murga (ESP)	Kelme–Gios	+ 2h 35' 45"
105	Jésus Suarez (ESP)	Kelme–Gios	+ 2h 37' 36"
106	Marc Dierickx (BEL)	DAF Trucks–Côte d'Or	+ 2h 38' 10"
107	Dirk Wayenberg (BEL)	Capri Sonne–Koga Miyata	+ 2h 40' 27"
108	Eddy Verstraeten (BEL)	Vermeer Thijs	+ 2h 44' 22"
109	Albert Zweifel (SUI)	Sem–France Loire–Campagnolo	+ 2h 44' 24"
110	Marcel Laurens (BEL)	DAF Trucks–Côte d'Or	+ 2h 45' 21"
111	Willy Teirlinck (BEL)	Boston–Mavic	+ 2h 46' 44"
112	Gerhard Schönbacher (AUT)	Puch–Wolber–Campagnolo	+ 2h 51' 30"
113	Johnny Broers (NED)	Splendor–Wickes Bouwmarkt–Europ Decor	+ 3h 01' 58"
114	Luc De Grauwe (BEL)	Boston–Mavic	+ 3h 05' 51"
115	Aad van den Hoek (NED)	TI–Raleigh–Creda	+ 3h 11' 29"
116	Jan Jonkers (NED)	Boston–Mavic	+ 3h 15' 21"
117	Johan Wellens (BEL)	Sunair–Sport 80–Colnago	+ 3h 16' 02"
118	Jorge Ruiz (ESP)	Teka–Campagnolo	+ 3h 16' 13"
119	Alain De Roo (BEL)	Sunair–Sport 80–Colnago	+ 3h 19' 07"
120	Philippe Tesniere (FRA)	Boston–Mavic	+ 4h 14' 59"
121	Faustino Cueli (ESP)	Teka–Campagnolo	+ 4h 29' 54"

=== Points classification ===
Final points classification (1–10)
Rank	Rider	Team	Points
1	Freddy Maertens (BEL)	Sunair–Sport 80–Colnago	428
2	William Tackaert (BEL)	DAF Trucks–Côte d'Or	222
3	Bernard Hinault (FRA)	Renault–Elf–Gitane	184
4	Alfons De Wolf (BEL)	Vermeer Thijs	152
5	Rudy Pevenage (BEL)	Capri Sonne–Koga Miyata	147
6	Phil Anderson (AUS)	Peugeot–Esso–Michelin	146
7	Sean Kelly (IRE)	Splendor–Wickes Bouwmarkt–Europ Decor	121
8	Johan van der Velde (NED)	TI–Raleigh–Creda	120
9	Yvon Bertin (FRA)	Renault–Elf–Gitane	110
10	Gilbert Duclos-Lassalle (FRA)	Peugeot–Esso–Michelin	83

=== Mountains classification ===
Final mountains classification (1–10)
Rank	Rider	Team	Points
1	Lucien Van Impe (BEL)	Boston–Mavic	284
2	Bernard Hinault (FRA)	Renault–Elf–Gitane	222
3	Jean-René Bernaudeau (FRA)	Peugeot–Esso–Michelin	168
4	Robert Alban (FRA)	La Redoute–Motobécane	134
5	Sven-Åke Nilsson (SWE)	Splendor–Wickes Bouwmarkt–Europ Decor	95
6	Phil Anderson (AUS)	Peugeot–Esso–Michelin	79
7	Peter Winnen (NED)	Capri Sonne–Koga Miyata	70
8	Raymond Martin (FRA)	Miko–Mercier–Vivagel	63
8	Alfons De Wolf (BEL)	Vermeer Thijs	63
10	Alberto Fernández (ESP)	Teka–Campagnolo	53

=== Young rider classification ===
Final young rider classification (1–10)
Rank	Rider	Team	Time
1	Peter Winnen (NED)	Capri Sonne–Koga Miyata	96h 40' 04"
2	Claude Criquielion (BEL)	Splendor–Wickes Bouwmarkt–Europ Decor	+5' 52"
3	Phil Anderson (AUS)	Peugeot–Esso–Michelin	+6' 26"
4	Jean-François Rodriguez (FRA)	Renault–Elf–Gitane	+18' 06"
5	Graham Jones (GBR)	Peugeot–Esso–Michelin	+20' 40"
6	Dominique Arnaud (FRA)	Puch–Wolber–Campagnolo	+ 31' 49"
7	Marino Lejarreta (ESP)	Teka–Campagnolo	+ 50' 11"
8	Theo de Rooij (NED)	Capri Sonne–Koga Miyata	+ 55' 36"
9	Ronny Claes (BEL)	Capri Sonne–Koga Miyata	+ 56' 03"
10	Juan Fernández (ESP)	Kelme–Gios	+ 1h 10' 20"

=== Combination classification ===
Final combination classification (1–6)
Rank	Rider	Team	Points
1	Bernard Hinault (FRA)	Renault–Elf–Gitane	6
2	Lucien Van Impe (BEL)	Boston–Mavic	20
3	Jean-René Bernaudeau (FRA)	Peugeot–Esso–Michelin	21
4	Phil Anderson (AUS)	Peugeot–Esso–Michelin	22
5	Alfons De Wolf (BEL)	Vermeer Thijs	23
6	Robert Alban (FRA)	La Redoute–Motobécane	25

=== Intermediate sprints classification ===
Final intermediate sprints classification (1–10)
Rank	Rider	Team	Points
1	Freddy Maertens (BEL)	Sunair–Sport 80–Colnago	131
2	William Tackaert (BEL)	DAF Trucks–Côte d'Or	106
3	Bernard Hinault (FRA)	Renault–Elf–Gitane	61
4	Yvon Bertin (FRA)	Renault–Elf–Gitane	51
5	Pierre Bazzo (FRA)	La Redoute–Motobécane	45
6	Rudy Pevenage (BEL)	Capri Sonne–Koga Miyata	43
7	Willy Teirlinck (BEL)	Boston–Mavic	38
8	Ludo Peeters (BEL)	TI–Raleigh–Creda	36
9	Phil Anderson (AUS)	Peugeot–Esso–Michelin	34
10	Marcel Laurens (BEL)	DAF Trucks–Côte d'Or	32

=== Team classification ===
Final team classification (1–10)
Rank	Team	Time
1	Peugeot–Esso–Michelin	399h 30' 24"
2	Renault–Elf–Gitane	+ 11' 20"
3	Capri Sonne–Koga Miyata	+ 26' 46"
4	La Redoute–Motobécane	+ 42' 49"
5	Sem–France Loire–Campagnolo	+ 45' 53"
6	Splendor–Wickes Bouwmarkt–Europ Decor	+ 52' 17"
7	TI–Raleigh–Creda	+ 1h 55' 35"
8	Miko–Mercier–Vivagel	+ 2h 15' 53"
9	DAF Trucks–Côte d'Or	+ 2h 23' 29"
10	Puch–Wolber–Campagnolo	+ 2h 29' 20"

=== Team points classification ===
Final team points classification (1–10)
Rank	Team	Points
1	Peugeot–Esso–Michelin	1086
2	Capri Sonne–Koga Miyata	1202
3	Renault–Elf–Gitane	1336
4	La Redoute–Motobécane	1583
5	TI–Raleigh–Creda	1632
6	Splendor–Wickes Bouwmarkt–Europ Decor	1838
7	Sem–France Loire–Campagnolo	1918
8	Miko–Mercier–Vivagel	2011
9	DAF Trucks–Côte d'Or	2285
10	Puch–Wolber–Campagnolo	2314

=== Combativity classification ===
Final combativity classification (1–5)
Rank	Rider	Team	Points
1	Bernard Hinault (FRA)	Renault–Elf–Gitane	25
2	Dominique Arnaud (FRA)	Puch–Wolber–Campagnolo	16
3	Gilbert Duclos-Lassalle (FRA)	Peugeot–Esso–Michelin	12
4	Willy Teirlinck (BEL)	Boston–Mavic	11
5	Phil Anderson (AUS)	Peugeot–Esso–Michelin	10
5	Pierre Bazzo (FRA)	La Redoute–Motobécane	10

== Aftermath ==
The 1981 Tour de France is seen as the year in which the globalization of the Tour became important. Before that most cyclists came from France, Spain, Italy, Belgium, Luxemburg and the Netherlands, with only occasional successes by other European cyclists. Anderson was the first non-European cyclist to lead the Tour de France, and more would follow in the coming years. The plans to make the Tour de France open to amateurs were not forgotten, and it happened in 1983.

Anderson would again wear the yellow jersey in the next year, when he also won the young rider classification.

Hinault won five stages as reigning world champion. It had happened before that a cyclist won a Tour stage as a world champion, most recently in 1979 with Gerrie Knetemann and in 1980 with Jan Raas, but after 1981 it became a rare occurrence. The next time that this happened was in 2002 with Óscar Freire, and after that in 2011 with Thor Hushovd.

Maertens who also won five stages would make his comeback year complete by winning the 1981 UCI Road World Championships later that year, but after that never reached his 1981 level again.

Jacques Boyer became the first American to ride in the Tour de France, acting as a domestique for Hinault.

== Bibliography ==
- Augendre, Jacques (2016). "Guide historique" [Historical guide] (PDF). Tour de France (in French). Paris: Amaury Sport Organisation. Archived (PDF) from the original on 17 August 2016.
- Dauncey, Hugh; Hare, Geoff (2003). The Tour de France, 1903–2003: A Century of Sporting Structures, Meanings and Values. London: Frank Cass & Co. ISBN 978-0-203-50241-9.
- Martin, Pierre; Penazzo, Sergio (1981). Tour 81: The Stories of the 1981 Tour of Italy and Tour de France. Keighley, UK: Kennedy Brothers Publishing.
- McGann, Bill; McGann, Carol (2008). The Story of the Tour de France: 1965–2007. Vol. 2. Indianapolis: Dog Ear Publishing. ISBN 978-1-59858-608-4.
- Nauright, John; Parrish, Charles (2012). Sports Around the World: History, Culture, and Practice. Vol. 2. Santa Barbara, California: ABC–CLIO. ISBN 978-1-59884-300-2.
- van den Akker, Pieter (2018). Tour de France Rules and Statistics: 1903–2018. Self-published. ISBN 978-1-79398-080-9.
