= 1980 Liège–Bastogne–Liège =

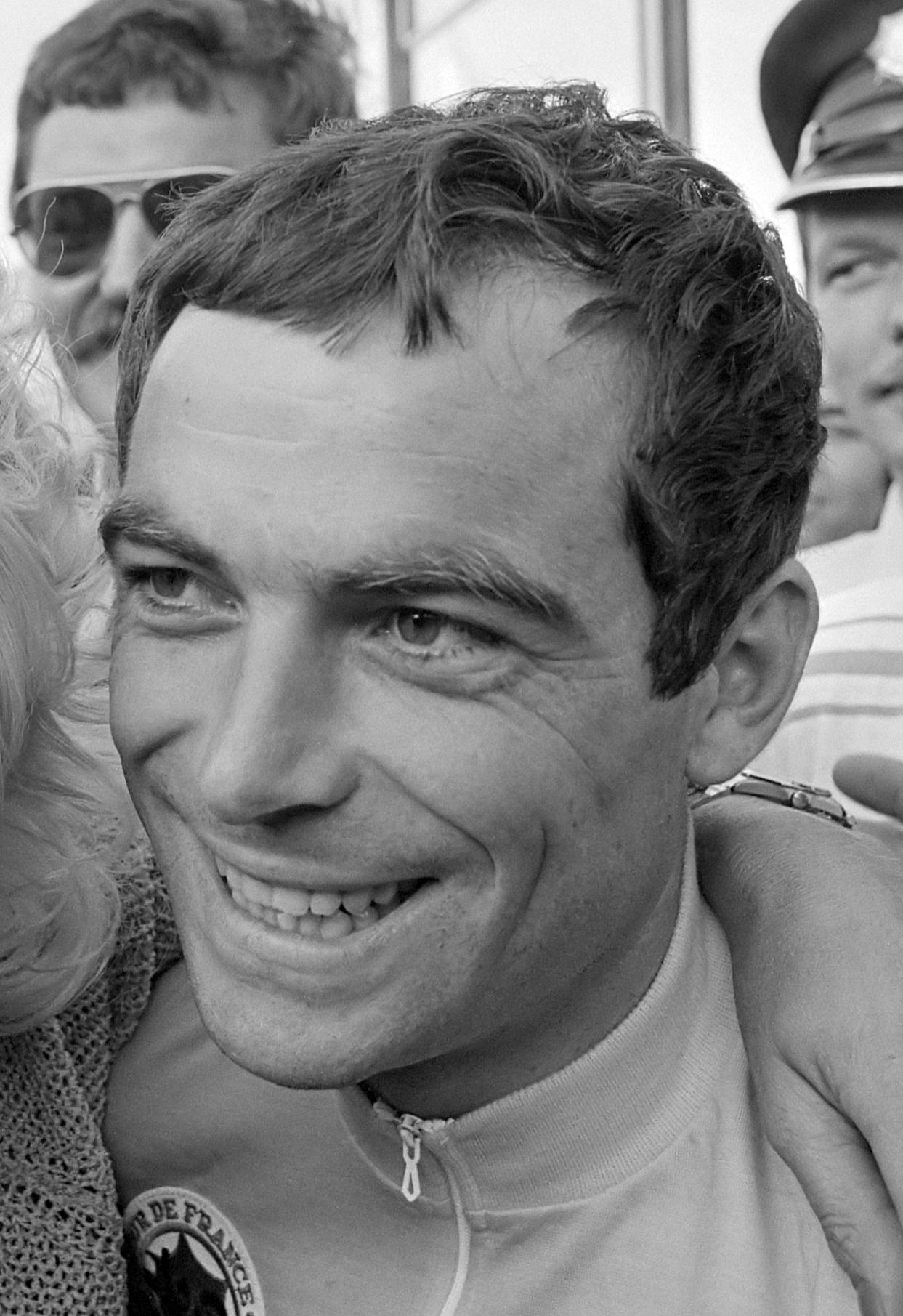
- Race winner Hinault (photographed in 1982)

Race details
- Dates: 20 April 1980
- Stages: 1
- Distance: 244 km (152 mi)
- Winning time: 7h 01' 42"

Results
	Winner	Bernard Hinault (FRA)	(Renault-Gitane)
	Second	Hennie Kuiper (NED)	(Peugeot)
	Third	Ronny Claes (BEL)	(IJsboerke)

The 66th running of Liège–Bastogne–Liège, the monument cycling race in Belgium, was held on 20 April 1980. It was won by French rider Bernard Hinault in an average speed of 34.717 km/h. The race was affected by abysmal weather conditions from start to finish. Only 21 of 174 participants finished the race.

== Teams ==
Fifteen teams participated in the race:

Professional cycling teams

- Renault–Gitane
- IJsboerke–Warncke Eis
- La Redoute–Motobécane
- DAF Trucks–Lejeune
- Boston–IFI–Mavic
- Puch–Sem–Campagnolo
- Peugeot–Esso–Michelin
- Boule d'Or–Studio Casa
- Safir–Ludo
- TI–Raleigh–Creda
- Bianchi–Piaggio
- Miko–Mercier–Vivagel
- Gis Gelati
- Splendor–Admiral
- Marc–Carlos–V.R.D.–Woningbouw

== Race summary ==
The peloton started the race in a raging snow storm. After one hour of racing more than half of all starters had abandoned the race; another hour later some 60 riders, just one-third of the field, were still in the race.

Two riders, Rudy Pevenage and Ludo Peeters, broke away from the shattered peloton and gained a 2'15” lead by the Stockeu climb. Bernard Hinault broke clear with Silvano Contini and Henk Lubberding and, after a 20 km chase, the Hinault group caught the leaders on the climb of the Haute Levée. With 80 km (50 mi) to go, Hinault attacked solo on the snow-covered roads and ploughed on to Liège. After seven hours of racing in glacial temperatures, he finished nearly 10 minutes ahead of Hennie Kuiper to claim his second Liège–Bastogne–Liège victory.

== Weather conditions ==
The edition was exceptionally hard because of the weather conditions: snow fell from the start and temperatures were near freezing point, leading commentators to call it Neige-Bastogne-Neige ("Snow-Bastogne-Snow"). Many media called it the worst Ardennes weather in the history of Liège–Bastogne–Liège. A feature published by the British magazine Procycling in 2000, described the infamous race:

A cold wind that blew across Belgium brought snow flakes and then a heavy fall within moments of the race starting. [...] Riders struggled on, with hands to faces to keep a view on the road. The race was an anonymous mass of plastic jackets and windcheaters. Spectators stood in goggles like upmarket snowmen, red-faced in the bitterness. Within the hour some teams had barely a man left on the road. They pulled out two dozen at a time, men like Gibi Baronchelli and Giuseppe Saronni, Lucien Van Impe and Jean-René Bernaudeau.

Hinault was one of just 21 riders to finish the race. He suffered frostbite in two fingers of his right hand, taking three weeks for proper movement to return, and causing permanent damage.

== Results ==
Final general classification

Rank	Rider	Team	Time
1	Bernard Hinault (FRA)	Renault–Gitane	7h 01' 42"
2	Hennie Kuiper (NED)	Peugeot–Esso–Michelin	+ 9' 24"
3	Ronny Claes (BEL)	IJsboerke–Warncke Eis	s.t.
4	Alfons De Wolf (BEL)	Boule d'Or–Studio Casa	+ 10' 34"
5	Pierre Bazzo (FRA)	La Redoute–Motobécane	s.t.
6	Ludo Peeters (BEL)	IJsboerke–Warncke Eis	s.t.
7	Herman Van Springel (BEL)	Safir–Ludo	+ 12' 05"
8	Guido Van Calster (BEL)	Splendor–Admiral	+ 12' 35"
9	Johan van der Velde (NED)	TI–Raleigh–Creda	s.t.
10	Eddy Schepers (BEL)	DAF Trucks–Lejeune	s.t.
