= 1981 La Flèche Wallonne =

Race details
- Dates: 17 April 1981
- Stages: 1
- Distance: 240 km (150 mi)
- Winning time: 5h 49' 00"

Results
	Winner	Daniel Willems (BEL)	(Capri Sonne–Koga Miyata)
	Second	Adri van der Poel (NED)	(DAF Trucks–Côte d'Or)
	Third	Guido Van Calster (BEL)	(Splendor–Wickes Bouwmarkt–Europ Decor)

The 1981 La Flèche Wallonne was the 45th edition of La Flèche Wallonne cycle race and was held on 17 April 1981. The race started in Spa and finished in Mons. The race was won by Daniel Willems of the Capri Sonne team.

== General classification ==
Final general classification

Rank	Rider	Team	Time
1	Daniel Willems (BEL)	Capri Sonne–Koga Miyata	5h 49' 00"
2	Adri van der Poel (NED)	DAF Trucks–Côte d'Or	+ 0"
3	Guido Van Calster (BEL)	Splendor–Wickes Bouwmarkt–Europ Decor	+ 0"
4	Sean Kelly (IRL)	Splendor–Wickes Bouwmarkt–Europ Decor	+ 0"
5	Stefan Mutter (SUI)	Cilo–Aufina	+ 0"
6	Willy Teirlinck (BEL)	Boston–Mavic	+ 0"
7	Rudy Pevenage (BEL)	Capri Sonne–Koga Miyata	+ 0"
8	Eddy Schepers (BEL)	DAF Trucks–Côte d'Or	+ 0"
9	Jos Jacobs (BEL)	Capri Sonne–Koga Miyata	+ 0"
10	Claude Criquielion (BEL)	Splendor–Wickes Bouwmarkt–Europ Decor	+ 0"
