= Johan Wellens =

Belgian cyclist (born 1956)

Personal information
- Born: 14 February 1956 (age 70)

Cycling career
- Sport: Cycling
- Role: Rider

Johan Wellens (born 14 February 1956) is a Belgian former racing cyclist. He rode in the 1981 Tour de France. He is the brother of fellow racing cyclists Paul and Leo Wellens and the uncle of cyclist Tim Wellens. At the 1981 Tour, he and his brothers all rode for the Sunair–Sport 80–Colnago team as domestiques for Freddy Maertens.
