= Leo Wellens =

Belgian cyclist

Personal information
- Born: 14 March 1959 (age 67) Hasselt, Belgium

Cycling career
- Sport: Cycling

Leo Wellens (born 14 March 1959) is a Belgian former cyclist. He competed in the team time trial event at the 1980 Summer Olympics. He is the brother of fellow racing cyclists Paul and Johan Wellens and the father of cyclist Tim Wellens. At the 1981 Tour de France, he and his brothers all rode for the Sunair–Sport 80–Colnago team as domestiques for Freddy Maertens.
