= Peter Winnen =

Dutch cyclist (born 1957)

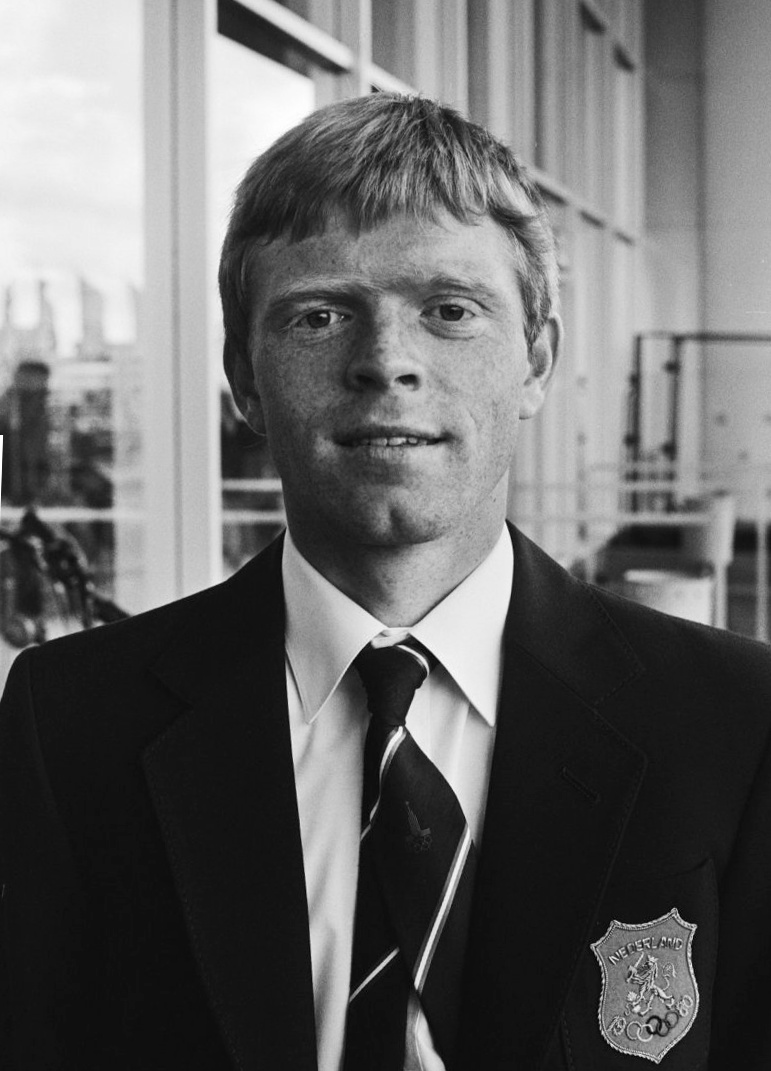
- Winnen in 1980

Personal information
- Full name: Peter Winnen
- Born: 5 September 1957 (age 69) Venray, Netherlands
- Height: 1.70 m (5 ft 7 in)
- Weight: 60 kg (132 lb)

Cycling career
- Sport: Cycling
- Current team: Retired
- Discipline: Road
- Role: Rider

Professional teams
- 1980: IJsboerke
- 1981–1982: Capri Sonne
- 1983: TI–Raleigh
- 1984–1989: Panasonic
- 1990–1991: Buckler–Colnago–Decca

Major wins
- Grand Tours Tour de France Young rider classification (1981) 2 Individual stages (1981, 1983) 1 Team Time Trial (1983) Single-Day Races and Classics Dutch Road Race Championship (1990)

Peter Johannes Gertrudis Winnen (born 5 September 1957) is a Dutch former road racing cyclist. He competed at the 1980 Summer Olympics in road racing and finished in 26th place. After the Games he turned professional in 1981. Among his 14 victories were two stages at Alpe d'Huez in the Tour de France and a national championship. He came third in the Tour de France in 1983.

== Doping confession ==
On the Dutch TV-show Reporter, Steven Rooks, Maarten Ducrot and Winnen admitted taking doping in their careers. Winnen talked about his Tour in 1986. "I was very bad and had the choice: go back to home or to provide me with testosterone." – Winnen reached Paris. During his career with Raleigh, Panasonic and Buckler, Winnen used testosterone, amphetamines and corticosteroids.

== Career achievements ==
=== Major results ===
1979
1st Stage 4 Tour de Liège
1981
5th Overall Tour de France

1st Young rider classification
1st Stage 17

1982
4th Overall Tour de France:

1st Stage 17

1983
3rd Overall Tour de France:

1st Stage 17

2nd Overall Tour de Suisse

1st Stage 4

1987
2nd Overall Tour de Suisse

1st Stage 7

8th Overall Giro d'Italia
1988
9th Overall Tour de France

1st Stage 2 (TTT)

8th Overall Giro d'Italia
1990
1st Dutch National Road Race Championship
1st Profronde van Heerlen

=== Grand Tour general classification results timeline ===
Grand Tour	1981	1982	1983	1984	1985	1986	1987	1988	1989	1990	1991
Giro d'Italia	—	—	—	—	—	—	8	8	29	—	—
Tour de France	5	4	3	26	15	DNF	—	9	—	DNF	—
Vuelta a España	—	—	—	—	DNF	15	—	—	—	—	15

Legend
—	Did not compete
DNF	Did not finish

== See also ==
- List of Dutch Olympic cyclists
- List of doping cases in cycling

Sporting positions
Preceded by Frans Maassen	Dutch National Road Race Champion; 1990	Succeeded by Steven Rooks
