= Ad Wijnands =

Dutch cyclist

Personal information
- Full name: Ad Wijnands
- Born: March 10, 1959 (age 67) Maastricht, the Netherlands

Cycling career
- Sport: Cycling
- Discipline: Road
- Role: Rider

Major wins
- Grand Tours Tour de France 2 individual stages (1981)

Ad Wijnands (born 10 March 1959 in Maastricht) is a Dutch former professional road bicycle racer, who won two stages in the 1981 Tour de France.

== Major results ==
1980
Omloop der Kempen
1980
Ronde van Zuid-Holland
1981
GP E5
Six Days of Maastricht (with René Pijnen)
Simpelveld
Voerendaal
Tour of Belgium
Boxmeer
Scheldeprijs
Tour de France:

Winner stages 9 and 11

1982
Elsloo
GP Union Dortmund
Six Days of Maastricht (with René Pijnen)
Thorn
1983
Maastricht
GP Impanis
Boxmeer
Helden-Panningen
Hoogerheide
1985
Antibes
Tegelen
1986
Hansweert
Ronde van Limburg
Grote 1-Mei Prijs
Wielsbeke
Maastricht
1988
Grand Prix d'Ouverture La Marseillaise
Helchteren
1989
Ede
Wingene
1990
Coca-Cola Trophy
GP Forbo
Polder-Kempen
Profronde van Maastricht
Schorndorf
1991
Hengelo
Étoile de Bessèges
1992
Profronde van Heerlen
1993
Profronde van Maastricht
