= Hubert Linard =

French cyclist

Personal information
- Born: 26 February 1953 (age 73) Clérey, France

Cycling career
- Sport: Cycling
- Role: Rider

Hubert Linard (born 26 February 1953) is a former French racing cyclist. He rode in six editions of the Tour de France between 1980 and 1985.
