= Marcel Tinazzi =

French cyclist

Personal information
- Born: 23 November 1953 (age 72) Maghnia, Tlemcen, Algeria

Cycling career
- Sport: Cycling
- Current team: Retired
- Discipline: Road racing
- Role: Rider

Professional team
- 1977-?: Flandria-Velda

Marcel Tinazzi (born 23 November 1953 at Maghnia in Tlemcen, Algeria) is a French former professional road bicycle racer of Italian parents. He was the cousin of an Italian professional cyclist Giorgio Tinazzi. He was a professional cyclist from 1977 until 1986. It was the famous and successful directeur sportif Jean de Gribaldy who offered Tinazzi his first professional contract in 1977 for the French squad of the Belgian team Flandria-Velda. The highlight of his career came in his first year as a professional, in 1977, when he won the national championships road race in France after a late attack inside the final kilometre. He spent most of his career with Jean de Gribaldy and was a teammate of Sean Kelly. He also won the old Classic race Bordeaux–Paris in 1982. Tinazzi now owns a cycling clothing company that is based in Italy called MS TINA.
