= Hubert Arbès =

French cyclist (born 1950)

Personal information
- Born: 9 January 1950 (age 76) Lys, Pyrénées-Atlantiques, France

Cycling career
- Sport: Cycling
- Discipline: Road
- Role: Rider

Amateur team
- CC Béarn

Professional teams
- 1975–1977: Gitane–Campagnolo
- 1978–1982: Renault–Gitane–Campagnolo

Hubert Arbès (born 9 January 1950) is a French former racing cyclist. His sporting career began with CC Bearn. He rode in five editions of the Tour de France between 1976 and 1982 and in the 1980 Giro d'Italia.

== Major results ==
1974
1st Overall Tour du Loir-et-Cher
2nd Paris–Troyes
3rd Paris–Rouen
4th Overall Tour de Bretagne
1977
1st Stage 5 Étoile des Espoirs
1978
3rd Overall Tour du Limousin

1st Stage 3

1980
3rd GP Monaco
