= Patrick Perret =

French cyclist

Personal information
- Born: 6 November 1953 (age 72) La Rochelle, France

Cycling career
- Sport: Cycling
- Role: Rider

Patrick Perret (born 6 November 1953) is a former French racing cyclist. He rode in eight editions of the Tour de France between 1975 and 1982. His sporting career began with ASPTT Besancon.
