= Pierre Bazzo =

French cyclist (born 1954)

Personal information
- Born: 17 January 1954 (age 72) Bourg, Gironde, France

Cycling career
- Sport: Cycling
- Discipline: Road
- Role: Rider

Professional teams
- 1976–1978: Lejeune–BP
- 1979–1982: La Redoute–Motobécane
- 1983–1984: COOP–Mercier–Mavic
- 1985: Fagor

Pierre Bazzo (born 17 January 1954) is a French former racing cyclist. He rode in nine editions of the Tour de France between 1977 and 1985. Bazzo tested positive for the anabolic steroid nandrolone after the 7th stage of the 1983 Tour de France.

== Major results ==
1976
1st Stage 8 Tour de l'Avenir
1977
6th Overall Circuit Cycliste Sarthe
1978
1st Stage 3 Tour du Vaucluse
2nd Grand Prix de Plumelec-Morbihan
1979
1st Grand Prix de Mauléon-Moulins
2nd Overall Tour du Limousin
6th Overall Critérium International
6th Overall Étoile de Bessèges
9th GP Ouest France-Plouay
1980
1st Stage 4 Paris–Nice
5th Liège–Bastogne–Liège
5th GP Ouest France-Plouay
5th Overall Critérium International
9th Overall Tour de France
1981
4th Overall Paris–Nice
7th GP Ouest France-Plouay
1982
1st Grand Prix de Mauléon-Moulins
6th Overall Tour du Limousin
6th GP de la Ville de Rennes
1983
1st Tour de Vendée
1st GP Ouest France-Plouay
2nd Overall Tour du Limousin
1984
1st Grand Prix de Plumelec-Morbihan
2nd GP de Fourmies
2nd Grand Prix de Cannes
6th Overall Four Days of Dunkirk
1985
3rd Overall Critérium du Dauphiné Libéré

1st Stage 5
