= Rudy Pevenage =

Belgian cyclist and coach

Rudy Pévenage
Personal information
- Full name: Rudy Pévenage
- Nickname: de rosse van Moerbeke
- Born: 15 June 1954 (age 72) Moerbeke, Belgium

Cycling career
- Sport: Cycling
- Current team: Retired
- Discipline: Road
- Role: Rider
- Rider type: Sprinter

Professional teams
- 1976–1980: IJsboerke–Colnago
- 1981–1982: Capri Sonne–Koga Miyata
- 1983–1986: Del Tongo–Colnago
- 1987–1988: Superconfex–Kwantum–Yoko–Colnago

Managerial teams
- 1989: Histor–Sigma
- 1990–1993: La William–Saltos
- 1994–2002: Team Telekom
- 2003: Team Coast
- 2006: T-Mobile Team
- 2009: Rock Racing

Major wins
- Grand Tours Tour de France Points classification (1980) 1 individual stage (1980) Giro d'Italia 1 TTT stage (1985)

Rudy Pévenage (15 June 1954) is a former Belgian cyclist, and later in his career team coach of cycling teams such as Histor–Sigma, La William–Saltos, Team Coast, and T-Mobile Team.

Pévenage was a professional cyclist from 1976 until 1988. His largest success was in the 1980 Tour de France: he won one stage and won the points classification. He reached second place in the 1979 Tour de Suisse. He also spent nine days in the yellow jersey, leading the general classification in the Tour de France. His nickname was de rosse van Moerbeke.

After his cycling career, Pévenage became a team manager. Pévenage was team manager of Deutsche Telekom when Jan Ullrich started his career. In 2002, when Ullrich was forced to leave the team, Pévenage followed Ullrich to his new team Bianchi. After a good 2003 Tour de France, Ullrich returned to Telekom, without Pévenage. In 2006, Pévenage returned to Telekom (then renamed T-Mobile). When Ullrich was suspected of using illegal doping in Operación Puerto and was fired by T-Mobile Team, Pévenage also had to leave. He was rumoured to have worked as a connection between Ullrich and the Spanish Eufemiano Fuentes.

== Major results ==
1976
2nd Ronde van Vlaanderen U23
3rd Circuit de Wallonie
7th Druivenkoers Overijse
1977
2nd Le Samyn
3rd Overall Ronde van Nederland

1st Stage 5

3rd Omloop van Oost-Vlaanderen
4th Leeuwse Pijl
6th Milano–Torino
7th Dwars door België
7th Brussels Cycling Classic
9th Overall Tour de Luxembourg
9th Paris–Tours
1978
2nd Leeuwse Pijl
3rd Overall Ronde van Nederland
3rd Ronde van Limburg
4th Grand Prix Pino Cerami
7th Trofeo Laigueglia
1979
1st Stage 1 (TTT) Vuelta a Andalucia Ruta Ciclista Del Sol
2nd Overall Tour de Suisse
3rd Circuit des Frontières
4th Grand Prix of Aargau Canton
1980
1st Points classification Tour de France

1st Stage 2

2nd Druivenkoers Overijse
4th Brabantse Pijl
6th Eschborn–Frankfurt
8th Züri-Metzgete
10th E3 Prijs Vlaanderen
1981
1st Tour de Berne
1st Druivenkoers Overijse
1st Omloop van het Houtland
2nd 1981 Grote Prijs Jef Scherens
4th 1981 Amstel Gold Race
4th Kuurne–Brussels–Kuurne
4th Brussels Cycling Classic
5th Grand Prix de Fourmies
7th Liège–Bastogne–Liège
7th La Flèche Wallonne
9th Nokere Koerse
9th Kampioenschap van Vlaanderen
1982
3rd Tour of Flanders
4th Tour de Berne
4th Grand Prix de Wallonie
4th Brussels Cycling Classic
6th Overall Setmana Catalana de Ciclisme
6th E3 Prijs Vlaanderen
6th Trofeo Laigueglia
1983
3rd Coppa Bernocchi
6th Milano–Torino
1984
2nd Trofeo Pantalica
2nd GP Montelupo
4th Trofeo Laigueglia
7th Coppa Sabatini
1985
1st Stage 2 (TTT) Giro d'Italia
9th Züri-Metzgete

=== General classification results timeline ===
Grand Tour general classification results
Grand Tour	1978	1979	1980	1981	1982	1983	1984	1985
Vuelta a España	—	—	—	—	—	DNF	DNF	—
Giro d'Italia	DNF	—	—	—	—	106	61	58
Tour de France	—	23	42	75	73	—	—	—

Legend
—	Did not compete
DNF	Did not finish
