= Charly Bérard =

French cyclist

Personal information
- Born: 27 September 1955 (age 71) Nice, France

Cycling career
- Sport: Cycling
- Role: Rider

Charly Bérard (born 27 September 1955) is a French former professional racing cyclist. He rode in seven editions of the Tour de France and one edition of the Giro d'Italia.

== Major results ==
1980
8th Overall Tour Méditerranéen
1985
1st Stage 3 Tour de Suisse
2nd Overall Critérium International

1st Stage 2

2nd Road race, National Road Championships
1986
4th Overall 4 Jours de Dunkerque
6th Overall Tour Méditerranéen
10th Overall Critérium du Dauphiné Libéré
1987
1st Chanteloup-les-Vignes
8th Overall Critérium International
10th Overall Route du Sud
