= Robert Alban =

French cyclist

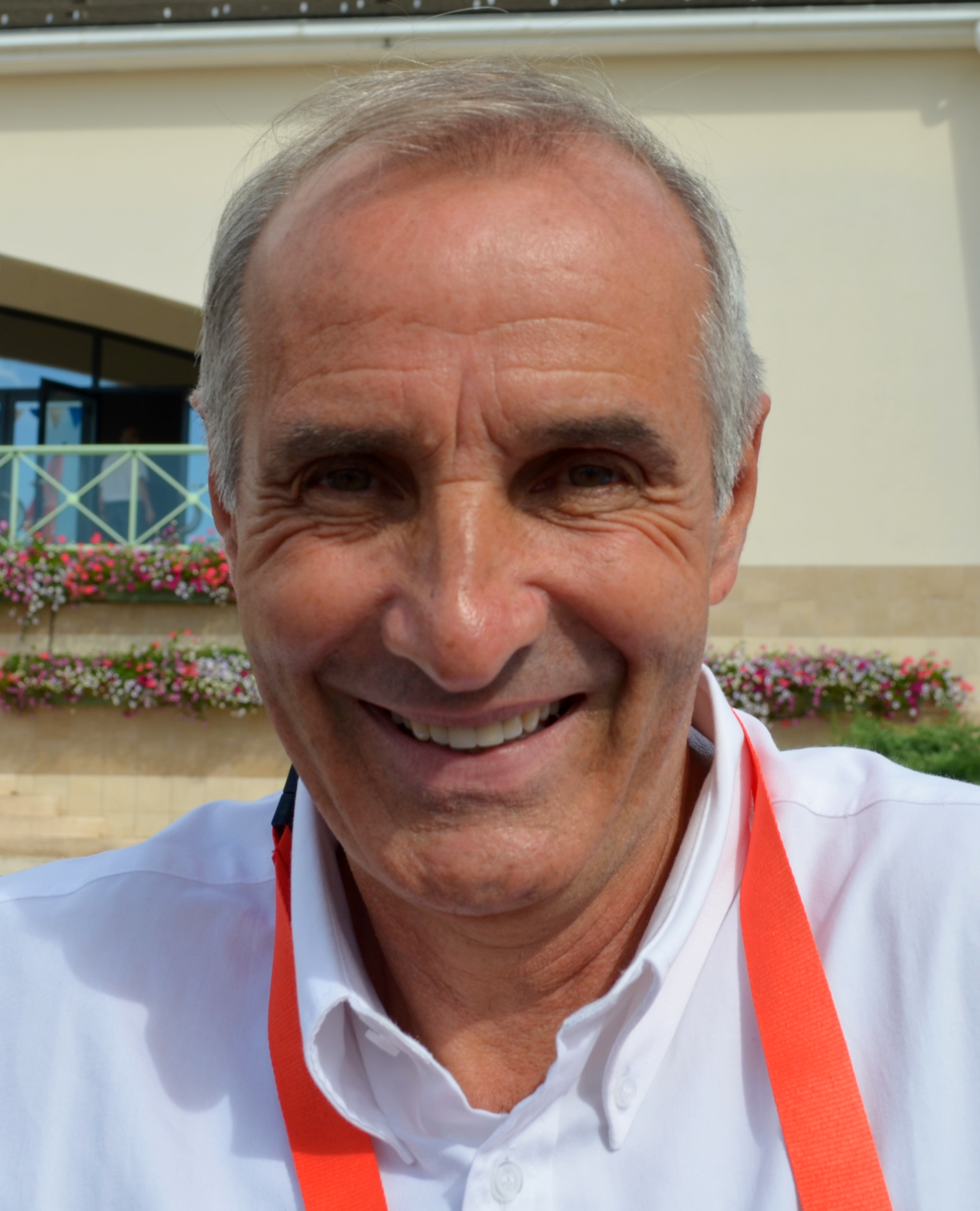

Personal information
- Full name: Robert Alban
- Born: 9 April 1952 (age 74) Saint-André-d'Huiriat, France

Cycling career
- Sport: Cycling
- Discipline: Road
- Role: Rider
- Rider type: Climber

Professional teams
- 1976: GAN-Mercier
- 1977–1978: Miko-Mercier
- 1979: Fiat
- 1980–1984: La Redoute-Motobecane
- 1985: U.N.C.P.

Major wins
- Grand Tours Tour de France 1 individual stage (1981)

Robert Alban (9 April 1952) was a French professional road bicycle racer. Alban won the stage 18 in the 1981 Tour de France, and finished third place in that year's overall classification.

Alban was born in Saint-André-d'Huiriat.

== Major results ==
1976
1st GP Plumelec
1977
2nd French National Cyclo-cross Championships
1979
19th Tour de France
1980
1st Quilan
2nd French National Cyclo-cross Championships
3rd Grand Prix de Mauléon-Moulin
3rd Cholet-Pays de Loire
1981
1st Beaulac-Bernos
1st Grand Prix de Plumelec-Morbihan
1st Lescouet-Jugon
3rd Overall Tour de France

1st Stage 18

1982
1st GP des Herbiers
1st Stage 5 Critérium du Dauphiné Libéré
3rd Grand Prix de Plumelec
1983
1st Lescouet-Jugon
5th Overall Tour de France
3rd Circuit de l'Aulne
3rd Overall Critérium du Dauphiné Libéré
