= Ronny Claes =

Belgian cyclist

Personal information
- Born: 10 October 1957 (age 69) Stolberg, Germany

Cycling career
- Sport: Cycling
- Role: Rider

Ronny Claes (born 10 October 1957) is a former Belgian racing cyclist. He rode three editions of the Tour de France between 1980 and 1983. He finished in third place in the 1980 Liège–Bastogne–Liège.
