= Jean-François Rodriguez =

French bicycle racer

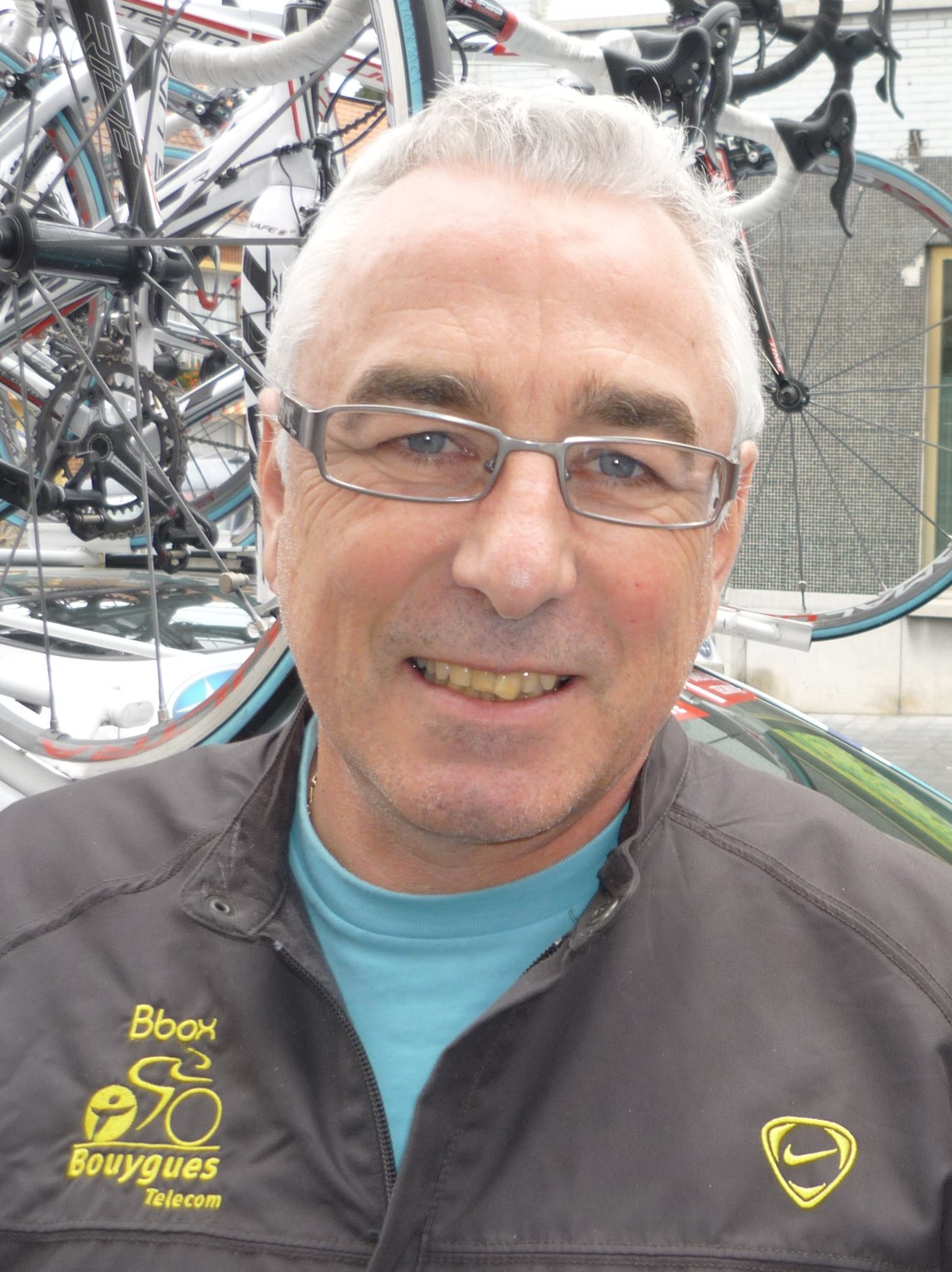
- Jean-François Rodriguez in 2009

Personal information
- Born: 19 December 1957 (age 68) Tarascon, France

Cycling career
- Sport: Cycling
- Role: Rider

Jean-François Rodriguez (born 19 December 1957) is a French former professional racing cyclist. He rode in four editions of the Tour de France and two editions of the Giro d'Italia.
