= Gery Verlinden =

Belgian cyclist

Personal information
- Full name: Gery Verlinden
- Born: 1 May 1954 (age 72) Mortsel, Belgium

Cycling career
- Sport: Cycling
- Role: Rider

Gery Verlinden (born 1 May 1954) is a Belgian former racing cyclist. He won the Belgian national road race title in 1979.

== Major results ==
1977
2nd Kampioenschap van Vlaanderen
2nd Petegem-aan-de-Leie
4th GP de Fourmies
1978
1st Stage 1 Tour de Suisse
1st GP Stad Vilvoorde
1st GP Union Dortmund
1st Hyon-Mons
2nd Kampioenschap van Vlaanderen
3rd Overall Étoile des Espoirs
7th Paris–Brussels
8th Overall Ronde van Nederland
9th Paris–Tours
9th Grote Prijs Jef Scherens
10th Overall Étoile de Bessèges
1979
1st Road race, National Road Championships
2nd De Kustpijl
3rd Omloop Schelde-Durme
1980
1st Le Samyn
1st Züri-Metzgete
2nd GP de Fourmies
2nd Leeuwse Pijl
3rd Overall Ronde van Nederland
4th Overall 4 Jours de Dunkerque
1981
1st GP Stad Zottegem
1st De Kustpijl
2nd Road race, National Road Championships
3rd Overall Tour of Belgium
4th Overall Deutschland Tour

1st Stage 6b (ITT)

6th Overall 4 Jours de Dunkerque
1982
1st Kampioenschap van Vlaanderen
5th Overall KBC Driedaagse van De Panne-Koksijde
8th Tour of Flanders
9th Overall Route du Sud
1983
10th Trofeo Laigueglia
1984
1st Schaal Sels
2nd Leeuwse Pijl
3rd Overall Herald Sun Tour

1st Stage 13

6th Grote Prijs Jef Scherens
8th Overall Tour of Belgium
1985
1st Stage 6 Herald Sun Tour
2nd De Kustpijl
3rd Grote Prijs Jef Scherens
7th Overall 4 Jours de Dunkerque
