= Serge Beucherie =

French cyclist

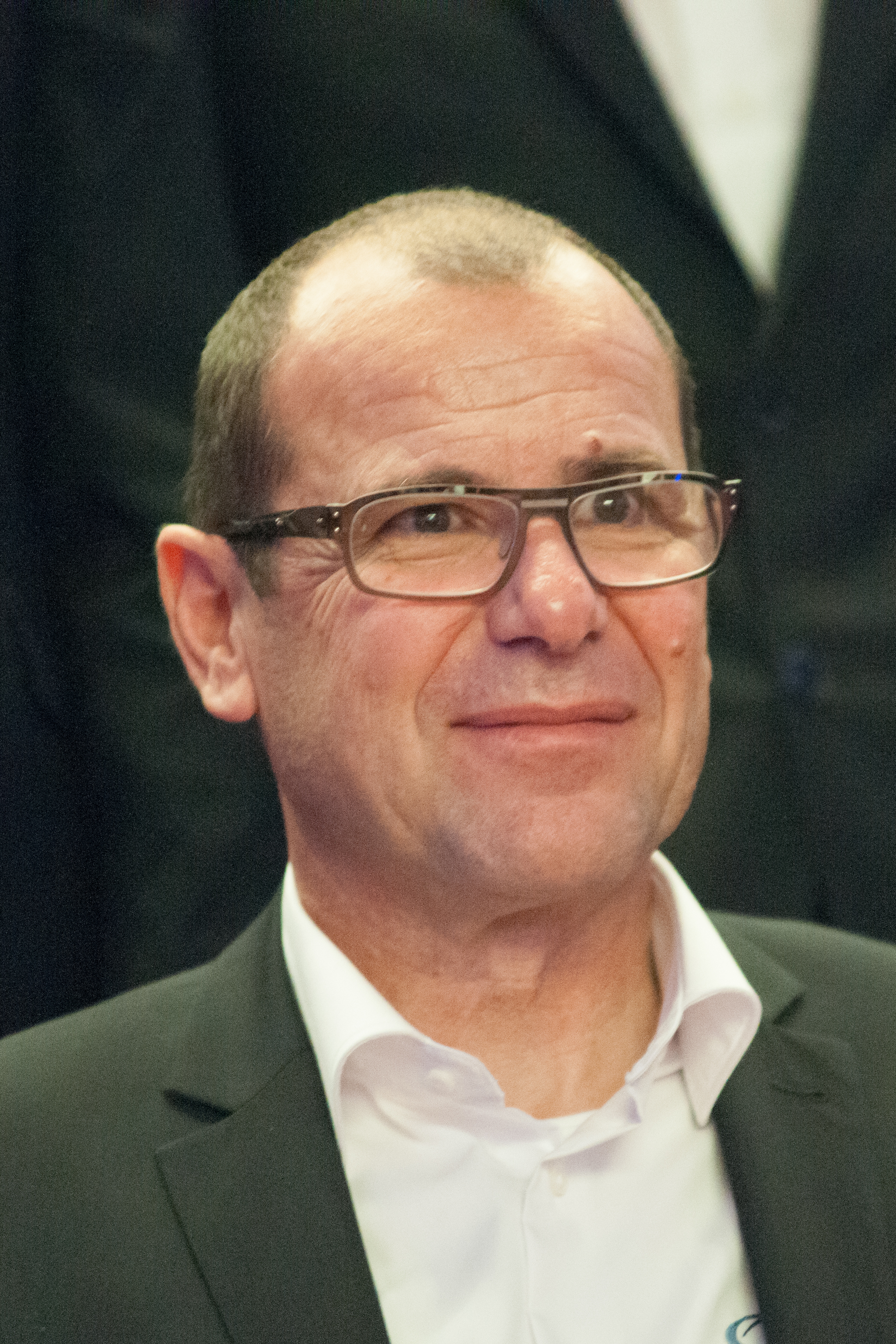
- Beucherie in 2014

Personal information
- Full name: Serge Beucherie
- Born: 17 January 1955 (age 71) Sannois, France

Cycling career
- Sport: Cycling
- Role: Rider

Serge Beucherie (born 17 January 1955) is a former French racing cyclist. He won the French national road race title in 1981. He raced as a professional racing cyclist from 1978 to 1984. He accumulated a total of 9 victories.

He was part of many cycling teams throughout the years: Fiat (French) (from 1978 to 1979), Sem-France-Loire-Campagnolo (from 1981 to 1983), Coop - Hoonved - Rossin (1984), and Rustines (1894).
