= Jos Jacobs =

Belgian cyclist

Personal information
- Full name: Jos Jacobs
- Born: 28 January 1953 (age 73) Vosselaar, Belgium

Cycling career
- Sport: Cycling
- Current team: Retired
- Discipline: Road
- Role: Rider

Major wins
- 1 stage 1979 Tour de France

Jos Jacobs (born 28 January 1953 in Vosselaar) is a Belgian former professional road bicycle racer.

== Major results ==
1973
Petegem-aan-de-Leie
1974
Grote Prijs Heist-op-den-Berg
Omloop der Grensstreek
Grote 1-Mei Prijs
Noorderwijk
1975
Omloop van Midden-Brabant
Schaal Sels-Merksem
Grote 1-Mei Prijs
Noorderwijk
Kalmthout
Oud-Turnhout
1976
Brussels-Ingooigem
Deerlijk
Nandrin
Polder-Kempen
Grote 1-Mei Prijs
Oostkamp
Zomergem
Diest
Oud-Turnhout
Onze-Lieve-Vrouw Waver
1977
GP Pino Cerami
Lede
Omloop der drie Provinciën
GP de Peymeinade
1978
Nationale Sluitingsprijs
Omloop Hageland-Zuiderkempen
Diest
Willebroek
1979
Schaal Sels-Merksem
Lutlommel
Rummen
Tour de France:

Winner stage 6

1980
(Belgium) Belgian National Road Race Championships
Peer
Herselt
Retie
1981
Kuurne–Brussels–Kuurne
Rund um den Henninger-Turm
Vosselaar
1982
GP Fina
Le Samyn
1983
Stekene
Burcht
1984
Flèche Hesbignonne
