= Boston–Mavic =

Belgian professional cycling team

- 1981 jersey

Team information
- Registered: Belgium
- Founded: 1980
- Disbanded: 1981
- Discipline: Road

Key personnel
- General manager: Robert Lauwers; Julien Stevens

Team name history
- 1980 1981: Boston–IFI–Mavic; Boston–Mavic

Boston–Mavic was a Belgian professional cycling team that existed in 1980 and 1981. Its main sponsor was electrical goods manufacturer Boston.
