= Boule d'Or (cycling team) =

Cycling team (1979–1983)

- 1981 jersey

Team information
- Registered: Belgium
- Founded: 1979
- Disbanded: 1983
- Discipline: Road

Team name history
- 1979 1980 1981 1981 (Tour de France) 1982 1982 (Tour de France) 1983: Lano–Boule d'Or; Boule d'Or–Studio Casa; Boule d'Or–Sunair; Sunair–Sport 80–Colnago; Boule d'Or–Sunair; Sunair–Colnago–Campagnolo; Boule d'Or–Colnago

Boule d'Or was a Belgian professional cycling team that existed from 1979 to 1983. Its main sponsor was cigarette brand Boule d'Or.
