= IJsboerke (cycling team) =

- 1974 jersey

Team information
- Registered: Belgium
- Founded: 1972
- Disbanded: 1982
- Discipline: Road

Team name history
- 1972 1973 1974–1975 1976–1977 1978 1979–1980 1981 1982: Goldor-Ijsboerke; IJsboerke–Bertin; IJsboerke–Colner; IJsboerke–Colnago; IJsboerke–Gios; IJsboerke–Warncke Eis; Capri Sonne–Koga Miyata; Capri Sonne–Campagnolo–Merckx

IJsboerke was a Belgian professional cycling team that existed from 1972 to 1982. Its main sponsor from 1973 to 1980 was Belgian ice cream manufacturer IJsboerke. In 1981 and 1982, its main sponsor was juice drink brand Capri-Sun (German: Capri-Sonne). Walter Godefroot won the 1978 Tour of Flanders with the team.

Rossin Bikes was also a co-sponsor and supplied their bicycles for the 1982 season.

One of their subsponsors was Koga Miyata, a bicycle manufacturer from Heerenveen that also sponsored amateur teams and Tulip Computers (1991–1992).
