= Gianbattista Baronchelli =

Italian cyclist (born 1953)

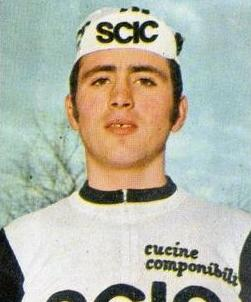
- Baronchelli in 1974

Personal information
- Full name: Gianbattista Baronchelli
- Nickname: Gibi
- Born: 6 September 1953 (age 73) Ceresara, Mantua, Italy

Cycling career
- Sport: Cycling
- Current team: Retired
- Discipline: Road
- Role: Rider

Professional teams
- 1974–1978: Scic
- 1979: Magniflex
- 1980–1982: Bianchi
- 1983: Sammontana
- 1984: Murella
- 1985–1986: Supermercati Brianzoli
- 1986–1987: Del Tongo
- 1988: Pepsi Cola
- 1989: Titanbonifica

Major wins
- Grand Tours Giro d'Italia 5 individual stages (1977, 1978, 1980, 1981, 1986) Vuelta a España 1 individual stages (1985) Stage races Tour of the Basque Country (1976) Tour de Romandie (1977) One-day races and Classics Giro di Lombardia (1977, 1986)
Medal record
Representing Italy
Men's road bicycle racing
World Championships
Silver medal – second place	1980 Sallanches	Road Race

Gianbattista Baronchelli (born 6 September 1953) is an Italian retired professional road racing cyclist. He obtained a total of 94 victories.

== Career ==
In 1973, as an amateur, he won the Tour de l'Avenir and the Baby Giro, and he was thought destined to win the Giro d'Italia. Although he knew the director of the Molteni team, they did not sign him, as they already had Eddy Merckx as their team captain, so Baronchelli signed a contract at the Scic team.

He was overall second at the Giro d'Italia in 1974 and 1978, and third in 1977. His other main accomplishments were a silver medal at the 1980 World Championships and two victories at the Giro di Lombardia (1977 and 1986).

Baronchelli started in the Tour de France twice, in 1976 and 1979, but both times did not finish the race. He won the Giro dell'Appennino six times in succession from 1977 to 1982.

== Major results ==
1973
1st Overall Trophée Peugeot de l'Avenir

1st Stage 4 (ITT)

1st Overall Giro Ciclistico d'Italia

1st Stage 7

2nd Piccolo Giro di Lombardia
1974
2nd Overall Giro d'Italia
3rd Giro della Provincia di Reggio Calabria
1975
1st Trofeo Laigueglia
1st Trofeo Baracchi (with Francesco Moser)
1st Prologue Tour de Romandie
1st Stage 5a Giro di Sardegna
2nd Giro del Friuli
2nd Sassari-Cagliari
4th Overall Paris–Nice
4th Gran Premio Città di Camaiore
5th Trofeo Pantalica
5th Giro della Provincia di Reggio Calabria
6th Gran Premio di Lugano
7th Giro di Lombardia
9th Giro del Veneto
9th Giro di Campania
10th Overall Giro d'Italia
10th Coppa Placci
10th Genoa–Nice
1976
1st Overall Tour of the Basque Country

1st Stages 1b & 3

1st Giro della Romagna
2nd Trofeo Laigueglia
3rd Overall Tirreno–Adriatico
3rd Overall Giro di Puglia
3rd Tre Valli Varesine
4th Giro dell'Appennino
5th Overall Giro d'Italia
6th Tour du Haut Var
7th Giro del Lazio
8th Giro di Toscana
9th Trofeo Pantalica
10th Gran Premio Industria e Commercio di Prato
1977
1st Overall Tour de Romandie

1st Stage 2

1st Giro di Lombardia
1st Giro dell'Appennino
2nd Coppa Agostoni
3rd Overall Giro d'Italia

1st Stage 18

4th Trofeo Baracchi (with Roy Schuiten)
6th Overall Tirreno–Adriatico
6th Overall Tour de l'Aude
6th Overall À travers Lausanne
8th Road race, National Road Championships
9th Overall Giro di Puglia
10th Gran Premio Industria e Commercio di Prato
1978
1st Giro del Piemonte
1st Giro dell'Appennino
1st Giro dell'Umbria
1st Coppa Placci
2nd Overall Giro d'Italia

1st Stage 15

2nd La Flèche Wallonne
2nd Giro della Provincia di Reggio Calabria
3rd Tre Valli Varesine
3rd Coppa Agostoni
3rd Trofeo Baracchi (with Bernt Johansson)
4th Giro del Veneto
4th Giro del Friuli
5th Giro del Lazio
6th Giro di Lombardia
6th Giro di Campania
7th Liège–Bastogne–Liège
8th Giro di Toscana
10th Overall Giro di Puglia
1979
1st Giro dell'Appennino
1st Giro della Romagna
2nd Overall Tour de Romandie
3rd Giro del Piemonte
3rd Trofeo Pantalica
4th Overall Critérium du Dauphiné Libéré
4th Liège–Bastogne–Liège
4th Giro del Veneto
4th Giro dell'Umbria
6th Trofeo Laigueglia
6th Coppa Agostoni
7th Giro dell'Emilia
7th Coppa Bernocchi
7th Gran Premio Industria e Commercio di Prato
7th GP Industria & Artigianato di Larciano
8th Overall Tirreno–Adriatico
1980
1st Overall Ruota d'Oro

1st Stage 2

1st Giro dell'Emilia
1st Giro del Piemonte
1st Giro dell'Appennino
1st Coppa Sabatini
1st Giro della Provincia di Reggio Calabria
1st Rund um den Henninger Turm
2nd Road race, UCI World Championships
2nd Overall Giro di Puglia

1st Stage 3

2nd Giro del Lazio
3rd Road race, National Road Championships
3rd Overall Giro del Trentino

1st Stage 3

4th Gran Premio Città di Camaiore
5th Overall Giro d'Italia

1st Stage 11

5th Overall Tirreno–Adriatico
6th Gran Premio Industria e Commercio di Prato
7th Trofeo Pantalica
8th Coppa Placci
8th Giro di Campania
9th La Flèche Wallonne
9th Giro dell'Umbria
9th Milano–Vignola
10th Overall Giro di Sardegna
1981
1st Overall Giro di Puglia
1st Giro di Toscana
1st Giro dell'Appennino
1st Giro del Lazio
2nd Coppa Agostoni
2nd GP Industria & Artigianato di Larciano
3rd Trofeo Matteotti
4th Paris–Tours
4th Giro di Campania
5th Giro dell'Umbria
5th Trofeo Baracchi (with Tommy Prim)
6th Overall Tour de Romandie
8th Gran Premio Industria e Commercio di Prato
9th Road race, National Road Championships
9th Tre Valli Varesine
9th Giro della Romagna
10th Overall Giro d'Italia

1st Stage 10

1982
1st Giro dell'Appennino
1st Giro dell'Umbria
1st GP Industria & Artigianato di Larciano
2nd Giro di Toscana
3rd Road race, National Road Championships
3rd Overall Giro del Trentino

1st Stage 1

3rd Overall Giro di Puglia
3rd Gran Premio Città di Camaiore
4th Coppa Sabatini
4th Gran Premio Industria e Commercio di Prato
5th Overall Giro d'Italia
5th Coppa Agostoni
6th Giro di Lombardia
6th Grand Prix de Fourmies
8th Overall Giro di Sardegna
1983
2nd Overall Giro di Puglia
2nd Giro di Campania
3rd Giro dell'Umbria
4th Tre Valli Varesine
4th Gran Premio Industria e Commercio di Prato
5th Giro del Veneto
6th Road race, National Road Championships
6th Coppa Agostoni
7th Giro dell'Emilia
7th Giro dell'Appennino
9th Overall Tour de Romandie
1984
1st Giro di Toscana
2nd Tre Valli Varesine
2nd Giro dell'Umbria
3rd Overall Giro di Puglia
4th Coppa Agostoni
6th Overall Giro d'Italia
6th Gran Premio Città di Camaiore
7th Trofeo Pantalica
8th Overall Giro del Trentino
8th Rund um den Henninger Turm
10th Giro di Campania
1985
1st Stage 3 Vuelta a España
4th Road race, National Road Championships
4th Overall Tirreno–Adriatico
4th Overall Ruota d'Oro
4th Coppa Agostoni
5th Giro del Friuli
6th Overall Giro d'Italia
9th Giro di Lombardia
1986
1st Giro di Lombardia
Giro d'Italia

1st Stage 4
Held after Stages 4 & 5

3rd Coppa Placci
3rd Trofeo Matteotti
4th Milano–Vignola
4th Firenze–Pistoia
5th Giro dell'Emilia
5th Coppa Agostoni
5th Gran Premio Città di Camaiore
6th Giro del Friuli
7th Overall Giro di Puglia
8th Giro del Lazio
8th Trofeo Pantalica
10th Road race, National Road Championships
1987
2nd Overall Giro del Trentino
4th Giro di Toscana
5th Tre Valli Varesine
6th Overall Giro di Puglia
9th Overall Tour of the Basque Country
9th Giro dell'Emilia
1988
2nd Gran Premio Città di Camaiore
3rd GP Industria & Artigianato di Larciano
4th Overall Giro del Trentino
4th Giro dell'Emilia
7th Road race, National Road Championships
7th Giro di Lombardia
7th Giro di Toscana
7th Giro dell'Appennino
8th Giro della Provincia di Reggio Calabria
9th Overall Route du Sud
9th Coppa Sabatini
1989
3rd Giro di Toscana
4th Giro del Friuli

=== Grand Tour general classification results timeline ===
Grand Tour	1974	1975	1976	1977	1978	1979	1980	1981	1982	1983	1984	1985	1986	1987	1988	1989
Vuelta a España	—	—	—	—	—	—	—	—	—	—	—	DNF	—	—	—	—
Giro d'Italia	2	10	5	3	2	—	5	10	5	17	6	6	DNF	DNF	—	—
Tour de France	—	—	DNF	—	—	DNF	—	—	—	—	—	—	—	—	—	—

=== Classics results timeline ===
Monuments results timeline
Monument	1974	1975	1976	1977	1978	1979	1980	1981	1982	1983	1984	1985	1986	1987	1988	1989
Milan–San Remo	26	50	14	80	86	54	—	31	—	—	—	70	—	131	—	—
Tour of Flanders	—	28	—	—	—	—	—	—	—	—	—	—	—	—	—	—
Paris–Roubaix	Did not contest during career															
Liège–Bastogne–Liège	—	—	—	—	7	4	DNF	—	—	—	13	—	—	—	—	—
Giro di Lombardia	—	7	—	1	6	23	—	21	6	26	—	8	1	—	7	—

=== Major championship results timeline ===
	1974	1975	1976	1977	1978	1979	1980	1981	1982	1983	1984	1985	1986	1987	1988	1989
World Championships	—	—	42	—	16	DNF	2	27	30	32	20	60	40	—	—	—
National Championships	38	—	—	8	18	—	3	9	3	6	—	4	10	—	7	33

Legend
—	Did not compete
DNF	Did not finish
