= 1976 Giro d'Italia, Stage 1a to Stage 11 =

Cycling race stages

The 1976 Giro d'Italia was the 59th edition of the Giro d'Italia, one of cycling's Grand Tours. The Giro began in Catania on 21 May, and Stage 11 occurred on 31 May with a flat stage to Gabicce Mare. The race finished in Milan on 12 June.

== Stage 1a ==
21 May 1976 — Catania to Catania, 64 km (40 mi)

Stage 1a result and general classification after Stage 1a

Rank	Rider	Team	Time
1	Patrick Sercu (BEL)	Brooklyn	1h 34' 08"
2	Roger De Vlaeminck (BEL)	Brooklyn	s.t.
3	Frans Van Looy (BEL)	Molteni–Campagnolo	s.t.
4	Alessio Antonini (ITA)	Jollj Ceramica–Decor	s.t.
5	Rik Van Linden (BEL)	Bianchi–Campagnolo	s.t.
6	Francesco Moser (ITA)	Sanson	s.t.
7	Knut Knudsen (NOR)	Jollj Ceramica–Decor	s.t.
8	Enrico Paolini (ITA)	Scic	s.t.
9	Daniele Tinchella (ITA)	Magniflex–Torpado	s.t.
10	Giancarlo Polidori (ITA)	G.B.C.	s.t.

== Stage 1b ==
21 May 1976 — Catania to Siracusa, 78 km (48 mi)

Stage 1b result

Rank	Rider	Team	Time
1	Patrick Sercu (BEL)	Brooklyn	2h 27' 01"
2	Rik Van Linden (BEL)	Bianchi–Campagnolo	s.t.
3	Roger De Vlaeminck (BEL)	Brooklyn	s.t.
4	Enrico Paolini (ITA)	Scic	s.t.
5	Pierino Gavazzi (ITA)	Jollj Ceramica–Decor	s.t.
6	Franco Bitossi (ITA)	Zonca–Santini	s.t.
7	Frans Van Looy (BEL)	Molteni–Campagnolo	s.t.
8	Francesco Moser (ITA)	Sanson	s.t.
9	Luciano Rossignoli (ITA)	Sanson	s.t.
10	Gabriele Mugnaini (ITA)	Furzi–Vibor	s.t.

General classification after Stage 1b

Rank	Rider	Team	Time
1	Patrick Sercu (BEL)	Brooklyn	4h 01' 09"
2	Roger De Vlaeminck (BEL)	Brooklyn	s.t.
3	Rik Van Linden (BEL)	Bianchi–Campagnolo	s.t.
4	Frans Van Looy (BEL)	Molteni–Campagnolo	s.t.
5	Enrico Paolini (ITA)	Scic	s.t.
6	Francesco Moser (ITA)	Sanson	s.t.
7	Daniele Tinchella (ITA)	Magniflex–Torpado	s.t.
8	Gabriele Mugnaini (ITA)	Furzi–Vibor	s.t.
9	Alfio Vandi (ITA)	Magniflex–Torpado	s.t.
10	Armando Lora (ITA)	Magniflex–Torpado	s.t.

== Stage 2 ==
22 May 1976 — Siracusa to Caltanissetta, 210 km (130 mi)

Stage 2 result

Rank	Rider	Team	Time
1	Roger De Vlaeminck (BEL)	Brooklyn	6h 40' 38"
2	Pierino Gavazzi (ITA)	Jollj Ceramica–Decor	s.t.
3	Francesco Moser (ITA)	Sanson	s.t.
4	Enrico Paolini (ITA)	Scic	s.t.
5	Patrick Sercu (BEL)	Brooklyn	s.t.
6	Franco Bitossi (ITA)	Zonca–Santini	s.t.
7	Rik Van Linden (BEL)	Bianchi–Campagnolo	s.t.
8	Eddy Merckx (BEL)	Molteni–Campagnolo	s.t.
9	Sebastián Pozo (ESP)	Kas–Campagnolo	s.t.
10	Ole Ritter (DEN)	Sanson	s.t.

General classification after Stage 2

Rank	Rider	Team	Time
1	Roger De Vlaeminck (BEL)	Brooklyn	10h 41' 47"
2	Patrick Sercu (BEL)	Brooklyn	s.t.
3	Rik Van Linden (BEL)	Bianchi–Campagnolo	s.t.
4	Enrico Paolini (ITA)	Scic	s.t.
5	Francesco Moser (ITA)	Sanson	s.t.
6	Alfio Vandi (ITA)	Magniflex–Torpado	s.t.
7	Frans Van Looy (BEL)	Molteni–Campagnolo	s.t.
8	Gianbattista Baronchelli (ITA)	Scic	s.t.
9	Sigfrido Fontanelli (ITA)	Sanson	s.t.
10	Felice Gimondi (ITA)	Bianchi–Campagnolo	s.t.

== Stage 3 ==
23 May 1976 — Caltanissetta to Palermo, 163 km (101 mi)

Stage 3 result

Rank	Rider	Team	Time
1	Rik Van Linden (BEL)	Bianchi–Campagnolo	5h 11' 10"
2	Patrick Sercu (BEL)	Brooklyn	s.t.
3	Roger De Vlaeminck (BEL)	Brooklyn	s.t.
4	Enrico Paolini (ITA)	Scic	s.t.
5	Pierino Gavazzi (ITA)	Jollj Ceramica–Decor	s.t.
6	Francesco Moser (ITA)	Sanson	s.t.
7	Alessio Antonini (ITA)	Jollj Ceramica–Decor	s.t.
8	Franco Bitossi (ITA)	Zonca–Santini	s.t.
9	Luciano Rossignoli (ITA)	Sanson	s.t.
10	Arnaldo Caverzasi (ITA)	Scic	s.t.

General classification after Stage 3

Rank	Rider	Team	Time
1	Patrick Sercu (BEL)	Brooklyn	15h 52' 57"
2	Roger De Vlaeminck (BEL)	Brooklyn	s.t.
3	Rik Van Linden (BEL)	Bianchi–Campagnolo	s.t.
4	Enrico Paolini (ITA)	Scic	s.t.
5	Francesco Moser (ITA)	Sanson	s.t.
6	Frans Van Looy (BEL)	Molteni–Campagnolo	s.t.
7	Alfio Vandi (ITA)	Magniflex–Torpado	s.t.
8	Gianbattista Baronchelli (ITA)	Scic	s.t.
9	Sigfrido Fontanelli (ITA)	Sanson	s.t.
10	Felice Gimondi (ITA)	Bianchi–Campagnolo	s.t.

== Stage 4 ==
24 May 1976 — Cefalù to Messina, 192 km (119 mi)

Stage 4 result

Rank	Rider	Team	Time
1	Francesco Moser (ITA)	Sanson	4h 57' 26"
2	Roger De Vlaeminck (BEL)	Brooklyn	s.t.
3	Miguel María Lasa (ESP)	Scic	s.t.
4	Gianbattista Baronchelli (ITA)	Scic	s.t.
5	Felice Gimondi (ITA)	Bianchi–Campagnolo	s.t.
6	Claudio Bortolotto (ITA)	Sanson	s.t.
7	Eddy Merckx (BEL)	Molteni–Campagnolo	s.t.
8	Alfredo Chinetti (ITA)	Jollj Ceramica–Decor	s.t.
9	Julián Andiano (ESP)	Teka	s.t.
10	Alfio Vandi (ITA)	Magniflex–Torpado	s.t.

General classification after Stage 4

Rank	Rider	Team	Time
1	Roger De Vlaeminck (BEL)	Brooklyn	20h 50' 23"
2	Francesco Moser (ITA)	Sanson	s.t.
3	Gianbattista Baronchelli (ITA)	Scic	s.t.
4	Alfio Vandi (ITA)	Magniflex–Torpado	s.t.
5	Felice Gimondi (ITA)	Bianchi–Campagnolo	s.t.
6	Alfredo Chinetti (ITA)	Jollj Ceramica–Decor	s.t.
7	Claudio Bortolotto (ITA)	Sanson	s.t.
8	Joseph Bruyère (BEL)	Molteni–Campagnolo	s.t.
9	Miguel María Lasa (ESP)	Scic	+ 16"
10	Roland Salm (SUI)	Zonca–Santini	s.t.

== Stage 5 ==
25 May 1976 — Reggio Calabria to Cosenza, 220 km (140 mi)

Stage 5 result

Rank	Rider	Team	Time
1	Roger De Vlaeminck (BEL)	Brooklyn	6h 34' 20"
2	Bruno Vicino (ITA)	Furzi–Vibor	s.t.
3	Eddy Merckx (BEL)	Molteni–Campagnolo	s.t.
4	Enrico Paolini (ITA)	Scic	s.t.
5	Alfredo Chinetti (ITA)	Jollj Ceramica–Decor	s.t.
6	Willy De Geest (BEL)	Brooklyn	s.t.
7	Roland Salm (SUI)	Zonca–Santini	s.t.
8	Alessio Antonini (ITA)	Jollj Ceramica–Decor	s.t.
9	Claudio Bortolotto (ITA)	Sanson	s.t.
10	Joaquim Agostinho (POR)	Teka	s.t.

General classification after Stage 5

Rank	Rider	Team	Time
1	Roger De Vlaeminck (BEL)	Brooklyn	27h 24' 43"
2	Francesco Moser (ITA)	Sanson	s.t.
3	Gianbattista Baronchelli (ITA)	Scic	s.t.
4	Alfio Vandi (ITA)	Magniflex–Torpado	s.t.
5	Alfredo Chinetti (ITA)	Jollj Ceramica–Decor	s.t.
6	Claudio Bortolotto (ITA)	Sanson	s.t.
7	Felice Gimondi (ITA)	Bianchi–Campagnolo	s.t.
8	Joseph Bruyère (BEL)	Molteni–Campagnolo	s.t.
9	Roland Salm (SUI)	Zonca–Santini	+ 16"
10	Miguel María Lasa (ESP)	Scic	s.t.

== Stage 6 ==
26 May 1976 — Cosenza to Matera, 207 km (129 mi)

Stage 6 result

Rank	Rider	Team	Time
1	Johan De Muynck (BEL)	Brooklyn	5h 44' 02"
2	Roger De Vlaeminck (BEL)	Brooklyn	+ 21"
3	Rik Van Linden (BEL)	Bianchi–Campagnolo	s.t.
4	Frans Van Looy (BEL)	Molteni–Campagnolo	s.t.
5	Giacinto Santambrogio (ITA)	Bianchi–Campagnolo	s.t.
6	Sebastián Pozo (ESP)	Kas–Campagnolo	s.t.
7	Pierino Gavazzi (ITA)	Jollj Ceramica–Decor	s.t.
8	Francesco Moser (ITA)	Sanson	s.t.
9	Claudio Bortolotto (ITA)	Sanson	s.t.
10	Bruno Vicino (ITA)	Furzi–Vibor	s.t.

General classification after Stage 6

Rank	Rider	Team	Time
1	Johan De Muynck (BEL)	Brooklyn	33h 09' 01"
2	Roger De Vlaeminck (BEL)	Brooklyn	+ 5"
3	Francesco Moser (ITA)	Sanson	s.t.
4	Alfio Vandi (ITA)	Magniflex–Torpado	s.t.
5	Gianbattista Baronchelli (ITA)	Scic	s.t.
6	Alfredo Chinetti (ITA)	Jollj Ceramica–Decor	s.t.
7	Claudio Bortolotto (ITA)	Sanson	s.t.
8	Felice Gimondi (ITA)	Bianchi–Campagnolo	s.t.
9	Joseph Bruyère (BEL)	Molteni–Campagnolo	s.t.
10	Fausto Bertoglio (ITA)	Jollj Ceramica–Decor	+ 21"

== Stage 7 ==
27 May 1976 — Ostuni to Ostuni, 37 km (23 mi) (ITT)

Stage 7 result

Rank	Rider	Team	Time
1	Francesco Moser (ITA)	Sanson	50' 19"
2	Felice Gimondi (ITA)	Bianchi–Campagnolo	+ 7"
3	Knut Knudsen (NOR)	Jollj Ceramica–Decor	+ 25"
4	Ole Ritter (DEN)	Sanson	+ 39"
5	Roland Salm (SUI)	Zonca–Santini	+ 43"
6	Johan De Muynck (BEL)	Brooklyn	+ 45"
7	Eddy Merckx (BEL)	Molteni–Campagnolo	+ 55"
8	Roger De Vlaeminck (BEL)	Brooklyn	+ 1' 01"
9	Jørgen Marcussen (DEN)	Furzi–Vibor	s.t.
10	Wladimiro Panizza (ITA)	Scic	+ 1' 13"

General classification after Stage 7

Rank	Rider	Team	Time
1	Francesco Moser (ITA)	Sanson	33h 59' 25"
2	Felice Gimondi (ITA)	Bianchi–Campagnolo	+ 7"
3	Johan De Muynck (BEL)	Brooklyn	+ 40"
4	Roland Salm (SUI)	Zonca–Santini	+ 59"
5	Roger De Vlaeminck (BEL)	Brooklyn	+ 1' 01"
6	Eddy Merckx (BEL)	Molteni–Campagnolo	+ 1' 11"
7	Wladimiro Panizza (ITA)	Scic	+ 1' 29"
8	Joseph Bruyère (BEL)	Molteni–Campagnolo	+ 1' 33"
9	Giancarlo Bellini (ITA)	Brooklyn	+ 1' 38"
10	Gianbattista Baronchelli (ITA)	Scic	+ 1' 41"

== Stage 8 ==
28 May 1976 — Selva di Fasano to Lago Laceno, 256 km (159 mi)

Stage 8 result

Rank	Rider	Team	Time
1	Roger De Vlaeminck (BEL)	Brooklyn	7h 46' 52"
2	Eddy Merckx (BEL)	Molteni–Campagnolo	s.t.
3	Felice Gimondi (ITA)	Bianchi–Campagnolo	s.t.
4	Fausto Bertoglio (ITA)	Jollj Ceramica–Decor	s.t.
5	Giovanni Battaglin (ITA)	Jollj Ceramica–Decor	s.t.
6	Alfio Vandi (ITA)	Magniflex–Torpado	s.t.
7	Andrés Oliva (ESP)	Kas–Campagnolo	s.t.
8	Wladimiro Panizza (ITA)	Scic	s.t.
9	Gianbattista Baronchelli (ITA)	Scic	s.t.
10	Gary Clively (AUS)	Magniflex–Torpado	s.t.

General classification after Stage 8

Rank	Rider	Team	Time
1	Felice Gimondi (ITA)	Bianchi–Campagnolo	41h 46' 24"
2	Johan De Muynck (BEL)	Brooklyn	+ 33"
3	Francesco Moser (ITA)	Sanson	+ 52"
4	Roger De Vlaeminck (BEL)	Brooklyn	+ 53"
5	Eddy Merckx (BEL)	Molteni–Campagnolo	+ 1' 04"
6	Wladimiro Panizza (ITA)	Scic	+ 1' 22"
7	Giancarlo Bellini (ITA)	Brooklyn	+ 1' 31"
8	Gianbattista Baronchelli (ITA)	Scic	+ 1' 34"
9	Fausto Bertoglio (ITA)	Jollj Ceramica–Decor	+ 1' 40"
10	Joaquim Agostinho (POR)	Teka	s.t.

== Stage 9 ==
29 May 1976 — Bagnoli Irpino to Roccaraso, 204 km (127 mi)

Stage 9 result

Rank	Rider	Team	Time
1	Fabrizio Fabbri (ITA)	Bianchi–Campagnolo	5h 42' 43"
2	Arnaldo Caverzasi (ITA)	Scic	s.t.
3	Jos Deschoenmaecker (BEL)	Molteni–Campagnolo	+ 1' 52"
4	Wladimiro Panizza (ITA)	Scic	+ 4' 17"
5	Eddy Merckx (BEL)	Molteni–Campagnolo	+ 4' 27"
6	Roger De Vlaeminck (BEL)	Brooklyn	s.t.
7	Giancarlo Bellini (ITA)	Brooklyn	s.t.
8	Giovanni Battaglin (ITA)	Jollj Ceramica–Decor	s.t.
9	Felice Gimondi (ITA)	Bianchi–Campagnolo	s.t.
10	Francesco Moser (ITA)	Sanson	s.t.

General classification after Stage 9

Rank	Rider	Team	Time
1	Felice Gimondi (ITA)	Bianchi–Campagnolo	47h 33' 34"
2	Johan De Muynck (BEL)	Brooklyn	+ 44"
3	Francesco Moser (ITA)	Sanson	+ 52"
4	Roger De Vlaeminck (BEL)	Brooklyn	+ 54"
5	Eddy Merckx (BEL)	Molteni–Campagnolo	+ 1' 04"
6	Wladimiro Panizza (ITA)	Scic	+ 1' 12"
7	Giancarlo Bellini (ITA)	Brooklyn	+ 1' 31"
8	Gianbattista Baronchelli (ITA)	Scic	+ 1' 34"
9	Fausto Bertoglio (ITA)	Jollj Ceramica–Decor	+ 1' 40"
10	Giovanni Battaglin (ITA)	Jollj Ceramica–Decor	+ 1' 43"

== Stage 10 ==
30 May 1976 — Roccaraso to Terni, 203 km (126 mi)

Stage 10 result

Rank	Rider	Team	Time
1	Patrick Sercu (BEL)	Brooklyn	5h 21' 07"
2	Marino Basso (ITA)	Furzi–Vibor	s.t.
3	Rik Van Linden (BEL)	Bianchi–Campagnolo	s.t.
4	Roger De Vlaeminck (BEL)	Brooklyn	s.t.
5	Bruno Vicino (ITA)	Furzi–Vibor	s.t.
6	Pierino Gavazzi (ITA)	Jollj Ceramica–Decor	s.t.
7	Giancarlo Polidori (ITA)	G.B.C.	s.t.
8	Daniele Tinchella (ITA)	Magniflex–Torpado	s.t.
9	Alessio Antonini (ITA)	Jollj Ceramica–Decor	s.t.
10	Enrico Paolini (ITA)	Scic	s.t.

General classification after Stage 10

Rank	Rider	Team	Time
1	Felice Gimondi (ITA)	Bianchi–Campagnolo	52h 54' 41"
2	Johan De Muynck (BEL)	Brooklyn	+ 44"
3	Francesco Moser (ITA)	Sanson	+ 52"
4	Roger De Vlaeminck (BEL)	Brooklyn	+ 54"
5	Eddy Merckx (BEL)	Molteni–Campagnolo	+ 1' 04"
6	Wladimiro Panizza (ITA)	Scic	+ 1' 12"
7	Giancarlo Bellini (ITA)	Brooklyn	+ 1' 31"
8	Gianbattista Baronchelli (ITA)	Scic	+ 1' 34"
9	Fausto Bertoglio (ITA)	Jollj Ceramica–Decor	+ 1' 40"
10	Giovanni Battaglin (ITA)	Jollj Ceramica–Decor	+ 1' 43"

== Stage 11 ==
31 May 1976 — Terni to Gabicce Mare, 222 km (138 mi)

Stage 11 result

Rank	Rider	Team	Time
1	Antonio Menéndez (ESP)	Kas–Campagnolo	5h 35' 47"
2	Rik Van Linden (BEL)	Bianchi–Campagnolo	+ 12' 47"
3	Roger De Vlaeminck (BEL)	Brooklyn	s.t.
4	Enrico Paolini (ITA)	Scic	s.t.
5	Eddy Merckx (BEL)	Molteni–Campagnolo	s.t.
6	Tullio Rossi (ITA)	Furzi–Vibor	s.t.
7	Pierino Gavazzi (ITA)	Jollj Ceramica–Decor	s.t.
8	Bruno Vicino (ITA)	Furzi–Vibor	s.t.
9	Roland Salm (SUI)	Zonca–Santini	s.t.
10	Francesco Moser (ITA)	Sanson	s.t.

General classification after Stage 11

Rank	Rider	Team	Time
1	Felice Gimondi (ITA)	Bianchi–Campagnolo	58h 43' 15"
2	Johan De Muynck (BEL)	Brooklyn	+ 44"
3	Francesco Moser (ITA)	Sanson	+ 52"
4	Roger De Vlaeminck (BEL)	Brooklyn	+ 54"
5	Eddy Merckx (BEL)	Molteni–Campagnolo	+ 1' 04"
6	Wladimiro Panizza (ITA)	Scic	+ 1' 12"
7	Giancarlo Bellini (ITA)	Brooklyn	+ 1' 31"
8	Gianbattista Baronchelli (ITA)	Scic	+ 1' 34"
9	Fausto Bertoglio (ITA)	Jollj Ceramica–Decor	+ 1' 40"
10	Giovanni Battaglin (ITA)	Jollj Ceramica–Decor	+ 1' 43"
