= Francesco Moser =

Italian cyclist (born 1951)

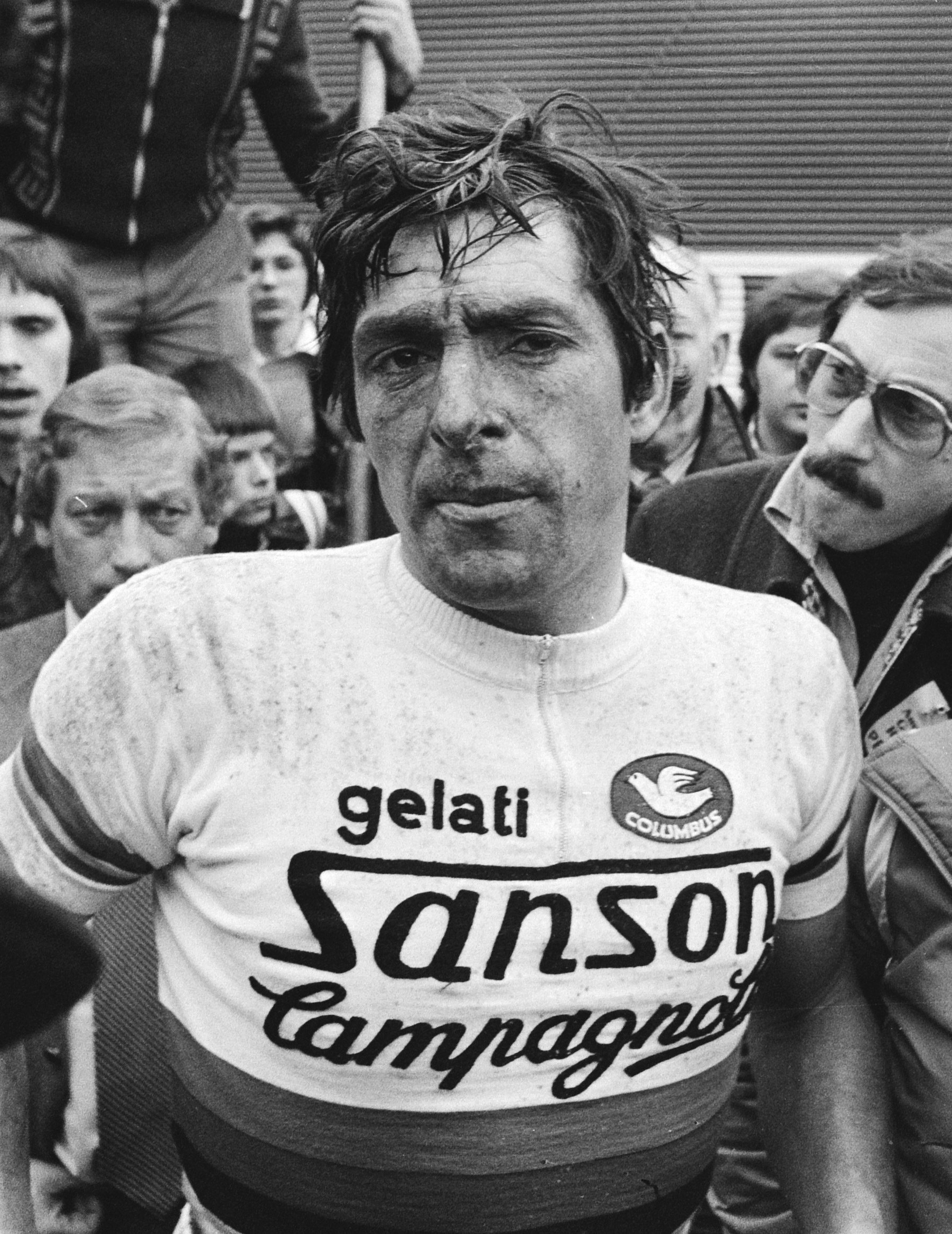
- Moser at the 1978 Amstel Gold Race

Personal information
- Nicknames: Checco; Lo Sceriffo (The Sheriff)
- Born: 19 June 1951 (age 75) Palù di Giovo, Italy
- Height: 1.81 m (5 ft 11 1/2 in)
- Weight: 78 kg (172 lb; 12 st 4 lb)

Cycling career
- Sport: Cycling
- Disciplines: Road; Track
- Role: Rider
- Rider type: Time trialist Classics specialist

Professional teams
- 1973–1975: Filotex
- 1976–1980: Sanson
- 1981–1982: Famcucine–Campagnolo
- 1983–1985: Gis Gelati
- 1986–1988: Supermercati Brianzoli

Major wins
- Grand Tours Tour de France Young rider classification (1975) 2 individual stages (1975) Giro d'Italia General classification (1984) Points classification (1976, 1977, 1978, 1982) 23 individual stages (1973, 1976, 1978–1982, 1984–1986) Vuelta a España 2 individual stages (1984) Stage races Volta a Catalunya (1978) Tirreno–Adriatico (1980, 1981) One-day races and Classics World Road Race Championships (1977) National Road Race Championships (1975, 1979, 1981) Paris–Roubaix (1978, 1979, 1980) Giro di Lombardia (1975, 1978) Milan–San Remo (1984) Paris–Tours (1974) La Flèche Wallonne (1977) Gent–Wevelgem (1979)
Medal record
Representing Italy
Men's road cycling
World Championships
Gold medal – first place	1977 San Christóbal	Road race
Silver medal – second place	1976 Ostuni	Road race
Silver medal – second place	1978 Nürburgring	Road race
Men's track cycling
World Championships
Gold medal – first place	1976 Monteroni di Lecce	Individual pursuit
Silver medal – second place	1979 Amsterdam	Individual pursuit

Francesco Moser (Italian: [franˈtʃesko ˈmɔːzer, - moˈzɛr], German: [ˈmoːzɐ]; born 19 June 1951), nicknamed "Lo sceriffo" (The sheriff), is an Italian former professional road bicycle racer. He finished on the podium of the Giro d'Italia six times, including his win in the 1984 edition.

Moser was dominant from the mid-1970s to the early 1980s. He turned professional in 1973, showing a cultured pedalling style. But his powerful build meant he was not a gifted climber. He entered one edition of the Tour de France, in 1975, where he won two stages, held the maillot jaune for six days and finished 7th overall. He also won the 1977 world road racing championship in addition to collecting silver medals in 1976 and 1978. He won six times in three of the five monuments: three consecutive editions of Paris–Roubaix, two victories in the Giro di Lombardia and one win in Milan–San Remo.

His 273 road victories puts him behind Eddy Merckx (525) and Rik Van Looy (379), but ahead of Rik Van Steenbergen (270) and Roger De Vlaeminck (255). He was also an accomplished track rider, riding up to six Six-Day races almost each winter throughout his career. He rode 35, 14 of which with René Pijnen, winning 15.

A nephew, Moreno Moser, (born 25 December 1990) is an Italian professional racer, and Francesco's son Ignazio Moser enjoyed success at the junior and amateur levels before retiring at the age of 22.

== Palmarès ==
=== Classic races ===
After finishing second in 1974 behind Roger De Vlaeminck and in 1976 behind Marc Demeyer of Belgium, Moser finally won Paris–Roubaix, his favourite race, three consecutive times. Moser had seven podium finishes in Paris–Roubaix; only De Vlaeminck, with nine, has more. In 1978, he beat De Vlaeminck and Jan Raas of the Netherlands; in 1979, he beat De Vlaeminck and Hennie Kuiper of the Netherlands; and in 1980, he beat Gilbert Duclos-Lassalle of France and the German, Dietrich Thurau. Moser came in third in 1981 behind Bernard Hinault and Roger De Vlaeminck, and was also third in 1983 behind Hennie Kuiper and Gilbert Duclos-Lassalle. He rode Paris–Roubaix in his final season as a cyclist in 1987. Other victories include the 1975 and 1978 Giro di Lombardia and the 1984 Milan–San Remo.

=== Other classics ===
Moser won the 1974 Paris–Tours, the 1977 Züri-Metzgete, the 1979 Gent–Wevelgem, and the 1977 Flèche Wallonne.

=== Grand Tours ===
Moser had some success in the three-week grand tours. He rode the Tour de France in 1975, and although he won two stages, led the race for seven days and won the young rider competition, he never rode the Tour again; the mountains did not suit him. However, he won the 1984 Giro d'Italia, in front of Laurent Fignon of France and Moreno Argentin of Italy. Taking advantage of an unusually flat course, Moser made the most of the time-trials and the aerodynamic bike with full disc wheels that he had just broken the hour record using (technology not available to any other rider during the race) to overcome what others had gained in the mountains. However, the result of the race has been called into question by various accusations, including shortened or redirected mountain stages, inconsistent awarding of penalties and low-flying helicopters being behind some riders but in front of others. He went on to win the points classification in the Giro d'Italia in 1976, 1977, 1978 and 1982.

== Other accomplishments ==
He competed in the individual road race and team time trial events at the 1972 Summer Olympics.

Moser won the 1977 world road racing championship in San Cristobal, Venezuela, in front of Thurau and Franco Bitossi. Moser was also a silver medallist in 1976, behind Freddy Maertens of Belgium and second in 1978 to Gerrie Knetemann of the Netherlands.

On 19 January 1984, in Mexico City, Moser broke the 1972 hour record of Eddy Merckx. His coach at the time was the now-banned for life Michele Ferrari. He rode 50.808 kilometres on an aerodynamic bike with full disc wheels, more advanced than the conventional bike Merckx used in 1972. As a result, in 1997, the Union Cycliste Internationale banned hour records set on bikes featuring technological advantages. Under the new rules, Merckx's record wasn't broken until 2000. Moser auctioned his bicycle to benefit UNICEF.

He was a member of the Regional Council of Trentino-Alto Adige from 1993 until 1998.

== Rivalries ==
Moser's biggest rival was Giuseppe Saronni.

== After retirement ==
Moser started a bike company, Moser Cicli, constructing race bikes in a workshop in Trento. Production is 2,000-3,000 frames annually.

He was the first chairman of the CPA (Cyclistes Professionels Associés), a union for professional riders of TT/I and TT/II league of teams (now UCI WorldTeams and UCI Professional Continental Teams, respectively). He held the position from 1999 until 2007.

Moser also became a viticulturist, cultivating different varieties of grapes. He continued his father's winery with his children Francesca, Carlo and Ignazio on the family estate Maso Villa Warth in Valle di Cembra, on the hills just north of Trento. He is also a passionate hunter and was the host of the television series "A Caccia con Moser" (Hunting with Moser) on Sky Italia's channel Caccia TV.

== Major results ==
1971
1st Overall Giro Ciclistico d'Italia

1st Stages 1a & 6

4th Trofeo Alcide Degasperi
1972
3rd Gran Premio della Liberazione
8th Road race, Olympic Games
1973
1st Stage 14 Giro d'Italia
3rd Giro della Provincia di Reggio Calabria
5th Overall Giro di Puglia
7th Trofeo Laigueglia
9th Overall Tirreno–Adriatico
9th La Flèche Wallonne
9th Milano–Torino
1974
1st Paris–Tours
1st Coppa Bernocchi
1st Giro del Piemonte
1st Giro dell'Emilia
1st Giro della Provincia di Reggio Calabria
1st Giro Di Toscana
1st Giro dell'Umbria
1st Trofeo Baracchi (with Roy Schuiten)
2nd Paris–Roubaix
2nd Coppa Placci
2nd Gran Premio di Lugano
2nd Trofeo Matteotti
2nd Gran Premio de Valencia
4th Giro della Romagna
5th Overall Tirreno–Adriatico
5th Grand Prix des Nations
5th Gran Premio Industria e Commercio di Prato
7th Road race, UCI Road World Championships
7th Overall Giro d'Italia
7th Giro di Lombardia
8th Overall Volta a la Comunitat Valenciana
10th Paris–Brussels
1975
1st Road race, National Road Championships
1st Overall Grand Prix du Midi Libre

1st Stages 3 & 4a

1st Giro di Lombardia
1st Trofeo Matteotti
1st Gran Premio Città di Camaiore
1st Coppa Placci
1st Giro dell'Umbria
1st Grand Prix de Monaco
1st Trofeo Baracchi (with Gianbattista Baronchelli)
2nd Overall Critérium du Dauphiné Libéré

1st Prologue (TTT)

2nd Milan–San Remo
2nd Trofeo Pantalica
2nd Gran Premio di Lugano
2nd Giro della Provincia di Reggio Calabria
3rd Züri-Metzgete
4th Overall Tirreno–Adriatico
4th Overall Giro di Puglia
4th Giro dell'Emilia
5th Paris–Roubaix
5th Milano–Torino
5th Giro Di Toscana
6th Giro del Veneto
6th Coppa Sabatini
6th Critérium des As
7th Overall Tour de France

1st Young rider classification
1st Prologue & Stage 7
Held after Prologue–Stage 5
Held after Prologue & Stage 1b

8th Overall À travers Lausanne
8th Gent–Wevelgem
9th Coppa Ugo Agostoni
10th Coppa Bernocchi
1976
1st Individual pursuit, UCI Track World Championships
1st Overall Giro di Puglia

1st Stage 2

1st Giro dell'Appennino
1st Giro Di Toscana
1st Trofeo Pantalica
1st Trofeo Matteotti
1st Tre Valli Varesine
2nd Road race, UCI Road World Championships
2nd Road race, National Road Championships
2nd Paris–Roubaix
2nd Tour of Flanders
2nd Coppa Bernocchi
2nd Coppa Placci
2nd Trofeo Baracchi (with Roy Schuiten)
3rd Coppa Ugo Agostoni
3rd Giro del Friuli
4th Overall Giro d'Italia

1st Points classification
1st Stages 4, 7 (ITT) & 14
Held after Stage 7

4th Overall Tirreno–Adriatico
4th Züri-Metzgete
6th Giro di Lombardia
6th Giro dell'Umbria
6th Giro di Campania
6th Milano–Vignola
7th Gent–Wevelgem
8th Gran Premio Industria e Commercio di Prato
9th Milan–San Remo
9th Giro dell'Emilia
1977
1st Road race, UCI Road World Championships
1st La Flèche Wallonne
1st Züri-Metzgete
1st Châteauroux Classic
1st Grand Prix Le Télégramme
1st Critérium des As
1st Coppa Ugo Agostoni
1st Giro del Lazio
1st Giro Di Toscana
1st Giro dell'Umbria
1st Stage 4 Tour de l'Aude
2nd Overall Giro d'Italia

1st Points classification
Held after Stages 5–16b

3rd Road race, National Road Championships
3rd Giro di Campania
4th Overall Giro di Puglia
4th Tour of Flanders
4th Giro del Veneto
5th Milano–Torino
5th Coppa Bernocchi
5th Trofeo Pantalica
5th Gran Premio Industria e Commercio di Prato
5th Giro della Provincia di Reggio Calabria
6th Trofeo Matteotti
6th Coppa Placci
6th Gran Premio Città di Camaiore
7th Amstel Gold Race
7th Giro dell'Emilia
9th Tre Valli Varesine
1978
1st Overall Volta a Catalunya

1st Points classification
1st Prologue, Stages 1, 3b & 7b (ITT)

1st Overall Tour de l'Aude

1st Prologue, Stages 1 & 3

1st Paris–Roubaix
1st Giro di Lombardia
1st Tre Valli Varesine
1st GP Industria & Artigianato di Larciano
1st Giro del Lazio
1st Coppa Sabatini
1st Trofeo Matteotti
1st Stage 2 Giro di Sardegna
2nd Road race, UCI Road World Championships
2nd Road race, National Road Championships
2nd Overall Giro di Puglia
2nd Amstel Gold Race
2nd Züri-Metzgete
2nd Gran Premio di Lugano
2nd Grand Prix des Nations
3rd Overall Giro d'Italia

1st Points classification
1st Stages 11b, 13, 14 (ITT) & 16 (ITT)

3rd Overall Tirreno–Adriatico
3rd Liège–Bastogne–Liège
3rd Gent–Wevelgem
3rd Trofeo Laigueglia
3rd Grand Prix of Aargau Canton
4th Rund um den Henninger Turm
6th Milan–San Remo
7th Tour of Flanders
8th Giro della Romagna
8th Critérium des As
9th Overall Grand Prix du Midi Libre

1st Prologue & Stage 3

1979
1st Road race, National Road Championships
1st Overall Ruota d'Oro

1st Stages 2 & 3 (ITT)

1st Overall Tour de l'Aude

1st Prologue

1st Paris–Roubaix
1st Gent–Wevelgem
1st Giro dell'Emilia
1st Giro del Friuli
1st Giro del Veneto
1st Trofeo Baracchi (with Giuseppe Saronni)
2nd Individual pursuit, UCI Track World Championships
2nd Overall Giro d'Italia

1st Prologue, Stages 3 (ITT) & 17
Held after Prologue–Stage 7
Held after Prologue, Stages 2–5, 15 & 17–18

2nd Overall Giro del Trentino
2nd Grand Prix des Nations
2nd Züri-Metzgete
2nd GP Industria & Artigianato di Larciano
2nd Coppa Ugo Agostoni
3rd Overall Deutschland Tour
3rd Trofeo Laigueglia
3rd Coppa Bernocchi
3rd Giro di Campania
4th Milan–San Remo
4th Giro del Lazio
5th Overall Tirreno–Adriatico

1st Prologue

5th Tre Valli Varesine
6th Trofeo Pantalica
1980
1st Overall Tirreno–Adriatico

1st Prologue

1st Overall Giro del Trentino

1st Prologue & Stage 1

1st Paris–Roubaix
1st Nice–Alassio
Giro d'Italia

1st Prologue
Held after Prologue–Stage 4
Held after Prologue–Stage 1

2nd Tour of Flanders
2nd Rund um den Henninger Turm
2nd Milano–Torino
2nd Trofeo Pantalica
2nd Milano–Vignola
3rd Overall Tour of Belgium
3rd Trofeo Laigueglia
3rd Coppa Sabatini
3rd Grand Prix des Nations
5th Coppa Ugo Agostoni
6th Milan–San Remo
6th Coppa Placci
7th Giro dell'Emilia
7th Giro del Lazio
8th Trofeo Matteotti
1981
1st Road race, National Road Championships
1st Overall Tirreno–Adriatico

1st Prologue

1st Overall Giro di Frasassi

1st Stage 2

1st Coppa Ugo Agostoni
1st Giro dell'Umbria
Giro d'Italia

1st Stage 14
Held after Stage 1b & Stages 3–5

2nd Overall Giro del Trentino
2nd Overall Ruota d'Oro
2nd Giro dell'Emilia
2nd Giro della Romagna
2nd Grand Prix Le Télégramme
2nd Milano–Vignola
2nd Trofeo Baracchi (with Knut Knudsen)
3rd Paris–Roubaix
3rd Coppa Bernocchi
3rd Giro Di Toscana
3rd Giro di Campania
3rd Giro dell'Etna
4th Rund um den Henninger Turm
4th Giro del Friuli
6th Road race, UCI Road World Championships
7th Giro del Lazio
8th Overall Tour de l'Aude
8th Coppa Placci
1982
1st Overall Tour Midi-Pyrénées

1st Prologue

1st Giro Di Toscana
1st Giro di Campania
1st Grand Prix Le Télégramme
2nd Overall Grand Prix du Midi Libre

1st Stage 1

2nd Overall Giro del Trentino
2nd Coppa Ugo Agostoni
3rd Overall Tour of the Basque Country
3rd Giro di Lombardia
3rd Coppa Sabatini
4th Overall Tirreno–Adriatico
4th Milan–San Remo
4th GP Industria & Artigianato di Larciano
6th Overall Giro di Sardegna
6th Overall Tour de l'Aude
7th Milano–Torino
7th Giro del Friuli
8th Overall Giro d'Italia

1st Points classification
1st Stages 7 & 20
Held after Stages 7–11

9th Overall Ruota d'Oro
9th Coppa Bernocchi
10th Paris–Roubaix
1983
1st Overall Giro del Trentino

1st Prologue

1st Overall Tour of Norway

1st Stage 1

1st Milano–Torino
1st Milano–Vignola
1st Giro del Friuli
1st Giro di Campania
1st Trofeo Pantalica
1st Giro dell'Umbria
2nd Giro del Lazio
3rd Overall Tirreno–Adriatico
3rd Paris–Roubaix
3rd Giro del Piemonte
3rd Giro della Provincia di Reggio Calabria
4th Giro del Veneto
4th Trofeo Matteotti
5th Giro di Lombardia
5th Critérium des As
10th Giro dell'Emilia
10th Gran Premio Città di Camaiore
1984
Best human effort: 50.808 km (19 Jan 1984)
Best human effort: 51.151 km (23 Jan 1984)
1st Overall Giro d'Italia

1st Prologue, Stages 6, 15 (ITT) & 22 (ITT)

1st Milan–San Remo
1st Giro del Lazio
1st Giro dell'Etna
1st Trofeo Baracchi (with Bernard Hinault)
2nd Gran Premio Città di Camaiore
5th Trofeo Pantalica
6th Grand Prix Le Télégramme
8th Critérium des As
10th Overall Vuelta a España

1st Prologue & Stage 11
Held after Prologue–Stage 5
Held after Prologue

1985
1st Giro dell'Appennino
1st Giro dell'Etna
1st Trofeo Baracchi (with Hans-Henrik Ørsted)
1st Stage 1 Ruota d'Oro
2nd Overall Giro d'Italia

1st Prologue, Stages 19 & 22 (ITT)
Held after Prologue–Stage 1

2nd Giro del Friuli
4th Giro di Campania
5th Overall Giro del Trentino
5th Giro dell'Emilia
5th Giro dell'Umbria
1986
1st Giro dell'Etna
2nd Overall Tirreno–Adriatico

1st Prologue & Stage 6 (ITT)

2nd Giro dell'Appennino
2nd Giro della Provincia di Reggio Calabria
3rd Overall Giro d'Italia

1st Stage 18 (ITT)

3rd Trofeo Pantalica
4th Overall Settimana Internazionale di Coppi e Bartali

1st Stage 4

5th Giro di Campania
6th Overall Giro di Puglia
6th Tre Valli Varesine
6th GP Industria & Artigianato di Larciano
7th Amstel Gold Race
7th Coppa Ugo Agostoni
8th Paris–Roubaix
9th Rund um den Henninger Turm
1987
3rd Overall Tour Méditerranéen

1st Prologue

4th Overall Giro del Trentino

1st Prologue

4th Firenze–Pistoia
5th Overall Tirreno–Adriatico
5th Milano–Vignola
9th Gran Premio Industria e Commercio di Prato
9th Trofeo Matteotti
10th Trofeo Pantalica

=== Grand Tour general classification results timeline ===
Grand Tour	1973	1974	1975	1976	1977	1978	1979	1980	1981	1982	1983	1984	1985	1986
Vuelta a España	—	—	—	—	—	—	—	—	—	—	—	10	—	—
Giro d'Italia	15	7	—	4	2	3	2	DNF	21	8	DNF	1	2	3
Tour de France	—	—	7	—	—	—	—	—	—	—	—	—	—	—

=== Monuments results timeline ===
Monument	1973	1974	1975	1976	1977	1978	1979	1980	1981	1982	1983	1984	1985
Milan–San Remo	30	12	2	9	35	6	4	6	39	4	11	1	31
Tour of Flanders	—	—	25	2	4	7	11	2	32	23	—	—	—
Paris–Roubaix	—	2	5	2	13	1	1	1	3	10	3	—	12
Liège–Bastogne–Liège	—	—	—	—	—	3	—	—	—	—	—	—	—
Giro di Lombardia	—	7	1	6	13	1	14	—	18	3	5	—	—

=== Major championships results timeline ===
Championship	1973	1974	1975	1976	1977	1978	1979	1980	1981	1982	1983	1984	1985
World Championships	—	7	11	2	1	2	—	—	26	26	—	—	—
National Championships	—	6	1	2	3	2	1	—	1	—	—	—	10

Legend
—	Did not compete
DNF	Did not finish

== See also ==
- Walk of Fame of Italian sport
- Hour record
- Italy at the UCI Road World Championships
- List of doping cases in cycling
- List of Giro d'Italia classification winners
- List of Giro d'Italia general classification winners
- List of Grand Tour general classification winners
- Moser Cicli
- Pink jersey statistics
