= Phil Edwards (cyclist) =

British cyclist (1949–2017)

Personal information
- Full name: Philip Edwards
- Born: 3 September 1949 Bristol, England
- Died: 24 April 2017 (aged 67) Monaco

Cycling career
- Sport: Cycling
- Discipline: Road
- Role: Rider
- Rider type: Domestique

Amateur team
- Western Road Club

Professional team
- 1976–1980: Sanson

Major wins
- One-day races and Classics National Road Race Championships (1977)

Philip Edwards (3 September 1949 – 24 April 2017) was a British professional road racing cyclist.

== Cycling career ==
He represented the United Kingdom at the 1972 Summer Olympics in Munich, West Germany, where he finished sixth in the road race, just behind teammate Phil Bayton.

He represented England in the road race, at the 1974 British Commonwealth Games in Christchurch, New Zealand before becoming a professional cyclist from 1976 to 1980.

It was reported that he died of a suspected heart attack at his home in Monaco on Monday, 24 April 2017 aged 67.

== Major results ==
1967
1st Road race, National Junior Road Championships
1972
1st Lincoln Grand Prix
6th Road race, Olympic Games
9th Overall Trophée Peugeot de l'Avenir
1974
1st Overall Giro del Friuli Venezia Giulia
1977
1st Road race, National Road Championships
2nd Tre Valli Varesine
3rd Giro dell'Emilia
3rd Trofeo Matteotti
6th Coppa Ugo Agostoni
1978
1st Stage 7a Volta a Catalunya
5th Coppa Bernocchi
7th Paris–Tours
1979
2nd Gran Premio Città di Camaiore

=== Grand Tour general classification results timeline ===
| Grand Tour | 1976 | 1977 | 1978 | 1979 |
|---|---|---|---|---|
| Vuelta a España | — | — | — | — |
| Giro d'Italia | 69 | 109 | 69 | 42 |
| Tour de France | — | — | — | — |

Legend
| — | Did not compete |
| DNF | Did not finish |
