= Claudio Bortolotto =

Italian cyclist

Personal information
- Full name: Claudio Bortolotto
- Born: 19 March 1952 (age 74) Orsago, Italy

Cycling career
- Sport: Cycling
- Discipline: Race
- Role: Rider

Professional teams
- 1974: Filcas
- 1975–1979: Filotex
- 1980: Mobili San Giacomo–Benotto
- 1981: Santini–Selle Italia
- 1982–1984: Del Tongo Del Tongo

Major wins
- Grand Tours Giro d'Italia Mountains classification (1979, 1980, 1981) 2 individual stages (1977, 1979)

Claudio Bortolotto (born 19 March 1952) is an Italian former professional cyclist. The highlight of his career came with his victories in the mountains classification at the Giro d'Italia, which he won in 1979, 1980, and 1981. Bortolotto finished also eighth overall in the 1977 and 1978 editions of the race. He retired from cycling in 1984.

== Major results ==
1973
5th Overall Giro Ciclistico d'Italia
1976
4th Gran Premio Città di Camaiore
1977
1st Gran Premio Industria e Commercio di Prato
7th Overall Tirreno–Adriatico
8th Overall Giro d'Italia

1st Stage 11

1978
1st Overall Grand Prix du Midi Libre

1st Stage 1

5th Giro della Romagna
8th Overall Giro d'Italia
9th Overall Volta a Catalunya
1979
Giro d'Italia

1st Mountains classification
1st Stage 4

3rd Road race, National Road Championships
1980
1st Mountains classification Giro d'Italia
2nd Giro dell'Etna
2nd Giro della Provincia di Reggio Calabria
10th Overall Tirreno–Adriatico
1981
1st Coppa Sabatini
3rd Giro della Provincia di Reggio Calabria
4th Trofeo Pantalica
5th Overall Giro del Trentino
9th Overall Giro d'Italia

1st Mountains classification

9th Overall Tirreno–Adriatico
10th Overall Tour of the Basque Country
10th Coppa Bernocchi
1982
6th Milan–San Remo
7th Overall Deutschland Tour

1st Stage 3

=== Grand Tour general classification results timeline ===
| Grand Tour | 1974 | 1975 | 1976 | 1977 | 1978 | 1979 | 1980 | 1981 | 1982 | 1983 | 1984 |
|---|---|---|---|---|---|---|---|---|---|---|---|
| Vuelta a España | — | — | — | — | — | — | DNF | — | — | 14 | DNF |
| Giro d'Italia | 35 | — | 22 | 8 | 8 | 15 | 25 | 9 | — | 34 | 38 |
| Tour de France | — | — | — | — | — | — | — | — | — | — | — |

Legend
| — | Did not compete |
| DNF | Did not finish |
