= 1978 Giro di Lombardia =

Race details
- Dates: 7 October 1978
- Stages: 1
- Distance: 266 km (165.3 mi)
- Winning time: 6h 48' 00"

Results
| | Winner | Francesco Moser (ITA) | (Sanson–Campagnolo) |
| | Second | Bernt Johansson (SWE) | (Fiorella–Mocassini–Citroën) |
| | Third | Bernard Hinault (FRA) | (Renault–Gitane–Campagnolo) |

The 1978 Giro di Lombardia was the 72nd edition of the Giro di Lombardia cycle race and was held on 7 October 1978. The race started in Milan and finished in Como. The race was won by Francesco Moser of the Sanson team.

== General classification ==
Final general classification

| Rank | Rider | Team | Time |
|---|---|---|---|
| 1 | Francesco Moser (ITA) | Sanson–Campagnolo | 6h 48' 00" |
| 2 | Bernt Johansson (SWE) | Fiorella–Mocassini–Citroën | + 0" |
| 3 | Bernard Hinault (FRA) | Renault–Gitane–Campagnolo | + 0" |
| 4 | Wladimiro Panizza (ITA) | Vibor | + 0" |
| 5 | Alfio Vandi (ITA) | Magniflex–Torpado | + 0" |
| 6 | Gianbattista Baronchelli (ITA) | Scic–Bottecchia | + 0" |
| 7 | Joop Zoetemelk (NED) | Miko–Mercier–Vivagel | + 0" |
| 8 | Roberto Ceruti (ITA) | Mecap–Selle Italia | + 0" |
| 9 | Johan De Muynck (BEL) | Bianchi–Faema | + 8" |
| 10 | Michel Pollentier (BEL) | Flandria–Velda–Lano | + 3' 10" |
