= 1980 Tirreno–Adriatico =

Race details
- Dates: 8–13 March 1980
- Stages: 5 + Prologue
- Distance: 814.3 km (506.0 mi)
- Winning time: 21h 17' 28"

Results
	Winner	Francesco Moser (ITA)	(Sanson–Campagnolo)
	Second	Alfons De Wolf (BEL)	(Boule d'Or–Studio Casa)
	Third	Dante Morandi (ITA)	(Hoonved–Bottecchia)

The 1980 Tirreno–Adriatico was the 15th edition of the Tirreno–Adriatico cycle race and was held from 8 March to 13 March 1980. The race started in Cerenova and finished in San Benedetto del Tronto. The race was won by Francesco Moser of the Sanson team.

== General classification ==
Final general classification

Rank	Rider	Team	Time
1	Francesco Moser (ITA)	Sanson–Campagnolo	21h 17' 28"
2	Alfons De Wolf (BEL)	Boule d'Or–Studio Casa	+ 59"
3	Dante Morandi (ITA)	Hoonved–Bottecchia	+ 1' 05"
4	Alf Segersäll (SWE)	Bianchi–Piaggio	+ 1' 13"
5	Gianbattista Baronchelli (ITA)	Bianchi–Piaggio	+ 1' 16"
6	Giuseppe Saronni (ITA)	Gis Gelati	+ 1' 19"
7	Bernt Johansson (SWE)	Magniflex–Olmo	+ 1' 36"
8	Michel Pollentier (BEL)	Splendor–Admiral	+ 1' 46"
9	Valerio Lualdi (ITA)	Gis Gelati	+ 2' 23"
10	Claudio Bortolotto (ITA)	San Giacomo–Benotto	+ 2' 26"
