= 1978 Paris–Roubaix =

Race details
- Dates: 16 April 1978
- Stages: 1
- Distance: 263 km (163.4 mi)
- Winning time: 7h 12' 24"

Results
	Winner	Francesco Moser (ITA)	(Sanson–Campagnolo)
	Second	Roger De Vlaeminck (BEL)	(Sanson–Campagnolo)
	Third	Jan Raas (NED)	(TI–Raleigh–McGregor)

The 1978 Paris–Roubaix was the 76th edition of the Paris–Roubaix cycle race and was held on 16 April 1978. The race started in Compiègne and finished in Roubaix. The race was won by Francesco Moser of the Sanson team.

== General classification ==
Final general classification

Rank	Rider	Team	Time
1	Francesco Moser (ITA)	Sanson–Campagnolo	7h 12' 24"
2	Roger De Vlaeminck (BEL)	Sanson–Campagnolo	+ 1' 40"
3	Jan Raas (NED)	TI–Raleigh–McGregor	+ 1' 40"
4	Freddy Maertens (BEL)	Flandria–Velda–Lano	+ 1' 40"
5	Ferdi Van Den Haute (BEL)	Marc Zeepcentrale–Superia	+ 4' 11"
6	Hennie Kuiper (NED)	TI–Raleigh–McGregor	+ 4' 26"
7	Guido Van Sweevelt (BEL)	IJsboerke–Gios	+ 5' 21"
8	Herman Van Springel (BEL)	Marc Zeepcentrale–Superia	+ 5' 21"
9	Ronan De Meyer (BEL)	Marc Zeepcentrale–Superia	+ 5' 21"
10	Marc Demeyer (BEL)	Flandria–Velda–Lano	+ 5' 49"
