= 1977 La Flèche Wallonne =

Race details
- Dates: 7 April 1977
- Stages: 1
- Distance: 223 km (138.6 mi)
- Winning time: 5h 55' 34"

Results
	Winner	Francesco Moser (ITA)	(Sanson)
	Second	Giuseppe Saronni (ITA)	(Scic)
	Third	–	

The 1977 La Flèche Wallonne was the 41st edition of La Flèche Wallonne cycle race and was held on 7 April 1977. The race started and finished in Verviers. The race was won by Francesco Moser of the Sanson team.

== General classification ==
Final general classification

Rank	Rider	Team	Time
DSQ	~~Freddy Maertens (BEL)~~	~~Flandria–Velda–Latina Assicurazioni~~	~~5h 55' 34"~~ (Note: Disqualified for doping.)
1	Francesco Moser (ITA)	Sanson	5h 55' 34"
2	Giuseppe Saronni (ITA)	Scic	+ 0"
4	Herman Van Springel (BEL)	IJsboerke–Colnago	+ 0"
5	Gerrie Knetemann (NED)	TI–Raleigh	+ 0"
~~6~~	~~Willy Teirlinck (BEL)~~	~~Gitane–Campagnolo~~	~~+ 0"~~
7	Walter Planckaert (BEL)	Maes Pils–Mini-Flat	+ 4"
~~8~~	~~Eddy Merckx (BEL)~~	~~Fiat France~~	~~+ 4"~~
9	Frans Verbeeck (BEL)	IJsboerke–Colnago	+ 4"
10	Roger De Vlaeminck (BEL)	Brooklyn	+ 4"
