= 1975 Giro di Lombardia =

Race details
- Dates: 11 October 1975
- Stages: 1
- Distance: 266 km (165.3 mi)
- Winning time: 7h 24' 00"

Results
	Winner	Francesco Moser (ITA)	(Filotex)
	Second	Enrico Paolini (ITA)	(Scic)
	Third	Alfredo Chinetti (ITA)	(Furzi–FT)

The 1975 Giro di Lombardia was the 69th edition of the Giro di Lombardia cycle race and was held on 11 October 1975. The race started in Milan and finished in Como. The race was won by Francesco Moser of the Filotex team.

== General classification ==
Final general classification

Rank	Rider	Team	Time
1	Francesco Moser (ITA)	Filotex	7h 24' 00"
2	Enrico Paolini (ITA)	Scic	+ 0"
3	Alfredo Chinetti (ITA)	Furzi–FT	+ 0"
4	Roger De Vlaeminck (BEL)	Brooklyn	+ 1' 17"
5	Freddy Maertens (BEL)	Carpenter–Confortluxe–Flandria	+ 1' 17"
6	Eddy Merckx (BEL)	Molteni–RYC	+ 1' 17"
7	Gianbattista Baronchelli (ITA)	Scic	+ 1' 17"
8	Wladimiro Panizza (ITA)	Brooklyn	+ 5' 55"
9	Antoine Houbrechts (BEL)	Bianchi–Campagnolo	+ 8' 55"
10	Jos Jacobs (BEL)	IJsboerke–Colner	+ 9' 34"
