= 1979 Paris–Roubaix =

Race details
- Dates: 8 April 1979
- Stages: 1
- Distance: 264 km (164.0 mi)
- Winning time: 6h 17' 28"

Results
	Winner	Francesco Moser (ITA)	(Sanson–Luxor TV–Campagnolo)
	Second	Roger De Vlaeminck (BEL)	(Gis Gelati)
	Third	Hennie Kuiper (NED)	(Peugeot–Esso–Michelin)

The 1979 Paris–Roubaix was the 77th edition of the Paris–Roubaix cycle race and was held on 8 April 1979. The race started in Compiègne and finished in Roubaix. The race was won by Francesco Moser of the Sanson team.

== General classification ==
Final general classification

Rank	Rider	Team	Time
1	Francesco Moser (ITA)	Sanson–Luxor TV–Campagnolo	6h 17' 28"
2	Roger De Vlaeminck (BEL)	Gis Gelati	+ 40"
3	Hennie Kuiper (NED)	Peugeot–Esso–Michelin	+ 40"
4	Joop Zoetemelk (NED)	Miko–Mercier–Vivagel	+ 40"
5	Jan Raas (NED)	TI–Raleigh–McGregor	+ 2' 14"
6	Willy Teirlinck (BEL)	Kas–Campagnolo	+ 2' 17"
7	Walter Planckaert (BEL)	Mini-Flat–V.D.B.–Pirelli	+ 2' 17"
8	Marc Demeyer (BEL)	Flandria–Ça va seul	+ 2' 17"
9	Alfons De Wolf (BEL)	Lano–Boule d'Or	+ 2' 27"
10	Etienne Van der Helst (BEL)	Kas–Campagnolo	+ 2' 27"
