= 1978 Liège–Bastogne–Liège =

Race details
- Dates: 23 April 1978
- Stages: 1
- Distance: 241.7 km (150.2 mi)
- Winning time: 6h 37' 42"

Results
	Winner	Joseph Bruyère (BEL)	(C&A)
	Second	Dietrich Thurau (FRG)	(IJsboerke–Gios)
	Third	Francesco Moser (ITA)	(Sanson–Campagnolo)

The 1978 Liège–Bastogne–Liège was the 64th edition of the Liège–Bastogne–Liège cycle race and was held on 23 April 1978. The race started and finished in Liège. The race was won by Joseph Bruyère of the C&A team.

== General classification ==
Final general classification

Rank	Rider	Team	Time
1	Joseph Bruyère (BEL)	C&A	6h 37' 42"
2	Dietrich Thurau (FRG)	IJsboerke–Gios	+ 1' 35"
3	Francesco Moser (ITA)	Sanson–Campagnolo	+ 1' 35"
4	Michel Laurent (FRA)	Peugeot–Esso–Michelin	+ 1' 35"
5	Herman Van Springel (BEL)	Marc Zeepcentrale–Superia	+ 1' 35"
6	Hennie Kuiper (NED)	TI–Raleigh–McGregor	+ 1' 35"
7	Gianbattista Baronchelli (ITA)	Scic–Bottecchia	+ 2' 05"
8	Yves Hézard (FRA)	Peugeot–Esso–Michelin	+ 2' 05"
9	Freddy Maertens (BEL)	Flandria–Velda–Lano	+ 4' 18"
10	Ludo Peeters (BEL)	IJsboerke–Gios	+ 4' 18"
