= 1975 Milan–San Remo =

Race details
- Dates: 19 March 1975
- Stages: 1
- Distance: 288 km (179 mi)
- Winning time: 7h 40' 26"

Results
	Winner	Eddy Merckx (BEL)	(Molteni–RYC)
	Second	Francesco Moser (ITA)	(Filotex)
	Third	Guy Sibille (FRA)	(Peugeot–BP–Michelin)

The 1975 Milan–San Remo was the 66th edition of the Milan–San Remo cycle race and was held on 19 March 1975. The race started in Milan and finished in San Remo. The race was won by Eddy Merckx of the Molteni team.

== General classification ==
Final general classification

Rank	Rider	Team	Time
1	Eddy Merckx (BEL)	Molteni–RYC	7h 40' 26"
2	Francesco Moser (ITA)	Filotex	+ 0"
3	Guy Sibille (FRA)	Peugeot–BP–Michelin	+ 0"
4	Tino Conti (ITA)	Furzi	+ 0"
5	Joseph Bruyère (BEL)	Molteni–RYC	+ 0"
6	Jean-Pierre Danguillaume (FRA)	Peugeot–BP–Michelin	+ 0"
7	Marino Basso (ITA)	Magniflex	+ 6"
8	Italo Zilioli (ITA)	Magniflex	+ 6"
9	Freddy Maertens (BEL)	Carpenter–Confortluxe–Flandria	+ 6"
10	Walter Planckaert (BEL)	Maes Pils–Watney	+ 6"
