= 1981 Tour de Romandie =

Race details
- Dates: 5–10 May 1981
- Stages: 5 + Prologue
- Distance: 859.8 km (534.3 mi)
- Winning time: 21h 54' 15"

Results
	Winner	Tommy Prim (SWE)	(Bianchi–Piaggio)
	Second	Giuseppe Saronni (ITA)	(Gis Gelati–Campagnolo)
	Third	Peter Winnen (NED)	(Capri Sonne–Koga Miyata)

The 1981 Tour de Romandie was the 35th edition of the Tour de Romandie cycle race and was held from 5 May to 10 May 1981. The race started in Morat and finished in Vernier. The race was won by Tommy Prim of the Bianchi team.

== General classification ==
Final general classification
Rank	Rider	Team	Time
1	Tommy Prim (SWE)	Bianchi–Piaggio	21h 54' 15"
2	Giuseppe Saronni (ITA)	Gis Gelati–Campagnolo	+ 27"
3	Peter Winnen (NED)	Capri Sonne–Koga Miyata	+ 1' 27"
4	Michel Laurent (FRA)	Peugeot–Esso–Michelin	+ 1' 31"
5	Joaquim Agostinho (POR)	Sem–France Loire–Campagnolo	+ 2' 16"
6	Gianbattista Baronchelli (ITA)	Bianchi–Piaggio	+ 2' 45"
7	Robert Millar (GBR)	Peugeot–Esso–Michelin	+ 3' 30"
8	Johan De Muynck (BEL)	Splendor–Wickes Bouwmarkt–Europ Decor	+ 4' 11"
9	Jo Maas (NED)	TI–Raleigh–Creda	+ 4' 17"
10	Gottfried Schmutz (SUI)	Cilo–Aufina	+ 4' 28"
