= 1977 Giro di Lombardia =

Race details
- Dates: 8 October 1977
- Stages: 1
- Distance: 257 km (159.7 mi)
- Winning time: 7h 03' 00"

Results
	Winner	Gianbattista Baronchelli (ITA)	(Scic)
	Second	Jean-Luc Vandenbroucke (BEL)	(Peugeot–Esso–Michelin)
	Third	Franco Bitossi (ITA)	(Vibor)

The 1977 Giro di Lombardia was the 71st edition of the Giro di Lombardia cycle race and was held on 8 October 1977. The race started in Seveso and finished in Como. The race was won by Gianbattista Baronchelli of the Scic team.

== General classification ==
Final general classification

Rank	Rider	Team	Time
1	Gianbattista Baronchelli (ITA)	Scic	7h 03' 00"
2	Jean-Luc Vandenbroucke (BEL)	Peugeot–Esso–Michelin	+ 1' 07"
3	Franco Bitossi (ITA)	Vibor	+ 1' 07"
4	Ronald De Witte (BEL)	Brooklyn	+ 1' 07"
5	Wladimiro Panizza (ITA)	Scic	+ 1' 07"
6	Alfio Vandi (ITA)	Magniflex–Torpado	+ 1' 07"
7	Joop Zoetemelk (NED)	Miko–Mercier–Vivagel	+ 1' 07"
8	Johan De Muynck (BEL)	Brooklyn	+ 2' 05"
9	Giuseppe Perletto (ITA)	Magniflex–Torpado	+ 2' 05"
10	Fabrizio Fabbri (ITA)	Sanson	+ 3' 03"
