= 1974 Giro di Lombardia =

Race details
- Dates: 12 October 1974
- Stages: 1
- Distance: 266 km (165.3 mi)
- Winning time: 7h 07' 54"

Results
| | Winner | Roger De Vlaeminck (BEL) | (Brooklyn) |
| | Second | Eddy Merckx (BEL) | (Molteni) |
| | Third | Tino Conti (ITA) | (Zonca) |

The 1974 Giro di Lombardia was the 68th edition of the Giro di Lombardia cycle race and was held on 12 October 1974. The race started in Milan and finished in Como. The race was won by Roger De Vlaeminck of the Brooklyn team.

== General classification ==
Final general classification

| Rank | Rider | Team | Time |
|---|---|---|---|
| 1 | Roger De Vlaeminck (BEL) | Brooklyn | 7h 07' 54" |
| 2 | Eddy Merckx (BEL) | Molteni | + 0" |
| 3 | Tino Conti (ITA) | Zonca | + 0" |
| 4 | Giuseppe Perletto (ITA) | Sammontana | + 2" |
| 5 | Frans Verbeeck (BEL) | Watney–Maes Pils | + 1' 24" |
| 6 | Bernard Thévenet (FRA) | Peugeot–BP–Michelin | + 1' 24" |
| 7 | Francesco Moser (ITA) | Filotex | + 1' 24" |
| 8 | Franco Bitossi (ITA) | Scic | + 2' 17" |
| 9 | Ole Ritter (DEN) | Filotex | + 2' 20" |
| 10 | Jean-Pierre Danguillaume (FRA) | Peugeot–BP–Michelin | + 2' 20" |
