= 1977 Tour du Haut Var =

Race details
- Dates: 27 February 1977
- Stages: 1
- Distance: 195 km (121.2 mi)
- Winning time: 5h 23' 22"

Results
	Winner	Bernard Thévenet (FRA)
	Second	Henk Lubberding (NED)
	Third	Johan De Muynck (BEL)

The 1977 Tour du Haut Var was the ninth edition of the Tour du Haut Var cycle race and was held on 27 February 1977. The race started in Seillans and finished in Draguignan. The race was won by Bernard Thévenet.

== General classification ==
Final general classification

Rank	Rider	Time
1	Bernard Thévenet (FRA)	5h 23' 22"
2	Henk Lubberding (NED)	+ 2"
3	Johan De Muynck (BEL)	+ 18"
4	Herman Van Springel (BEL)	+ 20"
5	Jean-Luc Vandenbroucke (BEL)	+ 50"
6	Bernard Hinault (FRA)	+ 50"
7	Joseph Bruyère (BEL)	+ 50"
8	Bert Pronk (NED)	+ 50"
9	Sven-Åke Nilsson (SWE)	+ 50"
10	Joseph Borguet (BEL)	+ 50"
