= 1981 Tirreno–Adriatico =

Race details
- Dates: 14–19 March 1981
- Stages: 5 + Prologue
- Distance: 835 km (518.8 mi)
- Winning time: 21h 00' 38"

Results
	Winner	Francesco Moser (ITA)	(Famcucine–Campagnolo)
	Second	Raniero Gradi (ITA)	(Sammontana)
	Third	Marino Amadori (ITA)	(Magniflex–Olmo)

The 1981 Tirreno–Adriatico was the 16th edition of the Tirreno–Adriatico cycle race and was held from 14 March to 19 March 1981. The race started in Rome and finished in San Benedetto del Tronto. The race was won by Francesco Moser of the Famcucine–Campagnolo team.

== General classification ==
Final general classification

Rank	Rider	Team	Time
1	Francesco Moser (ITA)	Famcucine–Campagnolo	21h 00' 38"
2	Raniero Gradi (ITA)	Sammontana	+ 35"
3	Marino Amadori (ITA)	Magniflex–Olmo	+ 58"
4	Stefan Mutter (SUI)	Cilo–Aufina	+ 1' 12"
5	Bruno Leali (ITA)	Inoxpran	+ 2' 06"
6	Maurice Le Guilloux (FRA)	Renault–Elf–Gitane	+ 2' 06"
7	Henk Lubberding (NED)	TI–Raleigh–Creda	+ 2' 15"
8	Alfio Vandi (ITA)	Selle San Marco	+ 2' 18"
9	Claudio Bortolotto (ITA)	Santini–Selle Italia	+ 2' 24"
10	Josef Fuchs (SUI)	Cilo–Aufina	+ 2' 43"
