= 1983 Paris–Roubaix =

Race details
- Dates: April 10, 1983
- Stages: 1
- Distance: 274 km (170.3 mi)
- Winning time: 6h 47' 51"

Results
	Winner	Hennie Kuiper (NED)	(Skil-Sem)
	Second	Gilbert Duclos-Lassalle (FRA)	(Peugeot)
	Third	Francesco Moser (ITA)	(Gis-Campagnolo)

The 1983 Paris–Roubaix was a road cycling race that took place on 10 April 1983 in Northern France.

As has happened frequently before, an important development to the 1983 Paris–Roubaix took place at the cobbles of the Trouée d'Arenberg, with former three times winner Francesco Moser setting a brutal pace. Moser continued his torrid pace through the next tough cobbled sections, reducing the field to just 5 riders.

Despite crashing twice, Hennie Kuiper maintained a position in the lead group, and knowing that Moser possessed the superior finish, Kuiper attacked from distance. This turned out to be a brilliant move as the other riders of the breakaway, Gilbert Duclos-Lassalle, Marc Madiot and Ronan De Meyer looked to Moser to chase Kuiper down. This tactical disarray allowed Kuiper to open a 1'30 lead with only 16 km to go.

Within the last six kilometers Kuiper suffered another setback, this time a puncture. His team managed to deliver a new bike in time, and Hennie Kuiper entered the velodrome in Roubaix on his own.

In the sprint for second Gilbert Duclos-Lassalle narrowly beat Francesco Moser.

The 1983 version of the Paris–Roubaix is generally regarded as a classic primarily due to Hennie Kuiper overcoming two crashes and a puncture, yet still strong enough to prevail in the face of some very elite competition. Of his fellow escapees, Francesco Moser was a former 3 times winner of the race, while both Gilbert Duclos-Lassalle and Marc Madiot would go on to win the event twice each.

Below, the results for the 1983 edition of the Paris–Roubaix cycling classic.

== Results ==
=== 1983: Paris–Roubaix, 274 km. ===
	Cyclist	Team	Time
1	Hennie Kuiper (NED)	Jacky Aernoudt-Rossin	6h 47'51"
2	Gilbert Duclos-Lassalle (FRA)	Peugeot-Shell	at 1'15
3	Francesco Moser (ITA)	Gis	at 1'15
4	Ronan De Meyer (BEL)	Boule d'Or	at 1'15
5	Marc Madiot (FRA)	Renault-Elf	at 1'15
6	Adri van der Poel (NED)	Jacky Aernoudt-Rossin	at 5'59
7	Patrick Versluys (BEL)	Euro Shop	at 5'59
8	Frank Hoste (BEL)	Europdecor-Dries	at 7'40
9	Eddy Planckaert (BEL)	Euro Shop	at 7'40
10	Alain Bondue (FRA)	La Redoute	at 8'40
