= 1980 Milan–San Remo =

Race details
- Dates: 16 March 1980
- Stages: 1
- Distance: 288 km (179 mi)
- Winning time: 6h 42' 07"

Results
| | Winner | Pierino Gavazzi (ITA) | (Magniflex–Olmo) |
| | Second | Giuseppe Saronni (ITA) | (Gis Gelati) |
| | Third | Jan Raas (NED) | (TI–Raleigh–Creda) |

The 1980 Milan–San Remo was the 71st edition of the Milan–San Remo cycle race and was held on 16 March 1980. The race started in Milan and finished in San Remo. The race was won by Pierino Gavazzi of the Magniflex team.

== General classification ==
Final general classification

| Rank | Rider | Team | Time |
|---|---|---|---|
| 1 | Pierino Gavazzi (ITA) | Magniflex–Olmo | 6h 42' 07" |
| 2 | Giuseppe Saronni (ITA) | Gis Gelati | + 0" |
| 3 | Jan Raas (NED) | TI–Raleigh–Creda | + 0" |
| 4 | Sean Kelly (IRL) | Splendor–Admiral | + 0" |
| 5 | Roger De Vlaeminck (BEL) | Boule d'Or–Studio Casa | + 0" |
| 6 | Francesco Moser (ITA) | Sanson–Campagnolo | + 0" |
| 7 | Jacques Bossis (FRA) | Peugeot–Esso–Michelin | + 0" |
| 8 | Klaus-Peter Thaler (FRG) | Teka | + 0" |
| 9 | Giuseppe Martinelli (ITA) | San Giacomo–Benotto | + 0" |
| 10 | Alfons De Wolf (BEL) | Boule d'Or–Studio Casa | + 0" |
