= 1981 Giro del Trentino =

Race details
- Dates: 5–7 May 1981
- Stages: 3
- Distance: 507.4 km (315.3 mi)
- Winning time: 13h 08' 30"

Results
	Winner	Roberto Visentini (ITA)
	Second	Francesco Moser (ITA)
	Third	Giovanni Mantovani (ITA)

The 1981 Giro del Trentino was the fifth edition of the Tour of the Alps cycle race and was held on 5 May to 7 May 1981. The race started and finished in Arco. The race was won by Roberto Visentini.

== General classification ==
Final general classification

Rank	Rider	Time
1	Roberto Visentini (ITA)	13h 08' 30"
2	Francesco Moser (ITA)	+ 13"
3	Giovanni Mantovani (ITA)	+ 1' 34"
4	Mario Beccia (ITA)	+ 1' 46"
5	Claudio Bortolotto (ITA)	+ 1' 46"
6	Glauco Santoni (ITA)	+ 1' 47"
7	Benedetto Patellaro (ITA)	+ 1' 57"
8	Ennio Vanotti (ITA)	+ 2' 09"
9	Franco Conti (ITA)	+ 2' 17"
10	Flavio Zappi (ITA)	+ 2' 26"
