= 1980 Giro del Trentino =

Race details
- Dates: 7–10 May 1980
- Stages: 3 + Prologue
- Distance: 638.5 km (396.7 mi)
- Winning time: 17h 22' 48"

Results
	Winner	Francesco Moser (ITA)
	Second	Tommy Prim (SWE)
	Third	Gianbattista Baronchelli (ITA)

The 1980 Giro del Trentino was the fourth edition of the Tour of the Alps cycle race and was held on 7 May to 10 May 1980. The race started and finished in Arco. The race was won by Francesco Moser.

== General classification ==
Final general classification

Rank	Rider	Time
1	Francesco Moser (ITA)	17h 22' 48"
2	Tommy Prim (SWE)	+ 24"
3	Gianbattista Baronchelli (ITA)	+ 40"
4	Giovanni Battaglin (ITA)	+ 48"
5	Mario Beccia (ITA)	+ 1' 14"
6	Serge Parsani (ITA)	+ 1' 30"
7	Claudio Torelli (ITA)	+ 1' 33"
8	Francesco Masi (ITA)	+ 1' 36"
9	Carmelo Barone (ITA)	+ 1' 37"
10	Luciano Loro (ITA)	+ 1' 37"
