= 1982 Giro del Trentino =

Race details
- Dates: 4–6 May 1982
- Stages: 3
- Distance: 603 km (374.7 mi)
- Winning time: 15h 30' 23"

Results
	Winner	Giuseppe Saronni (ITA)
	Second	Francesco Moser (ITA)
	Third	Gianbattista Baronchelli (ITA)

The 1982 Giro del Trentino was the sixth edition of the Tour of the Alps cycle race and was held on 4 May to 6 May 1982. The race started in Arco and finished in Trento. The race was won by Giuseppe Saronni.

== General classification ==
Final general classification

Rank	Rider	Time
1	Giuseppe Saronni (ITA)	15h 30' 23"
2	Francesco Moser (ITA)	+ 0"
3	Gianbattista Baronchelli (ITA)	+ 0"
4	Moreno Argentin (ITA)	+ 0"
5	Alessandro Paganessi (ITA)	+ 0"
6	Franco Chioccioli (ITA)	+ 0"
7	Fabrizio Verza (ITA)	+ 0"
8	Wladimiro Panizza (ITA)	+ 2"
9	Roberto Visentini (ITA)	+ 2"
10	Franco Conti (ITA)	+ 25"
