= 1982 Giro di Lombardia =

Race details
- Dates: 16 October 1982
- Stages: 1
- Distance: 248 km (154.1 mi)
- Winning time: 6h 05' 07"

Results
	Winner	Giuseppe Saronni (ITA)	(Del Tongo)
	Second	Pascal Jules (FRA)	(Renault–Elf–Gitane)
	Third	Francesco Moser (ITA)	(Famcucine)

The 1982 Giro di Lombardia was the 76th edition of the Giro di Lombardia cycle race and was held on 16 October 1982. The race started in Milan and finished in Como. The race was won by Giuseppe Saronni of the Del Tongo team.

== General classification ==
Final general classification

Rank	Rider	Team	Time
1	Giuseppe Saronni (ITA)	Del Tongo	6h 05' 07"
2	Pascal Jules (FRA)	Renault–Elf–Gitane	+ 0"
3	Francesco Moser (ITA)	Famcucine	+ 0"
4	Jean-Luc Vandenbroucke (BEL)	La Redoute–Motobécane	+ 0"
5	Alfio Vandi (ITA)	Selle San Marco	+ 0"
6	Gianbattista Baronchelli (ITA)	Bianchi–Piaggio	+ 0"
7	Jean-Marie Grezet (SUI)	Cilo–Aufina	+ 0"
8	Hubert Seiz (SUI)	Cilo–Aufina	+ 0"
9	Claude Criquielion (BEL)	Splendor–Wickes Bouwmarkt	+ 0"
10	Hennie Kuiper (NED)	DAF Trucks–TeVe Blad	+ 0"
