= 1978 Volta a Catalunya =

Race details
- Dates: 7–14 September 1978
- Stages: 7 + Prologue
- Distance: 1,175.5 km (730.4 mi)
- Winning time: 32h 31' 20"

Results
| | Winner | Francesco Moser (ITA) | (Sanson–Campagnolo) |
| | Second | Francisco Galdós (ESP) | (Kas–Campagnolo) |
| | Third | Pedro Torres (ESP) | (Teka) |
| | Points | Francesco Moser (ITA) | (Sanson–Campagnolo) |
| | Mountains | Vicente Belda (ESP) | (Transmallorca–Gios) |
| | Sprints | Ludo Schurgers (BEL) | (Mini-Flat–Boule d'Or–Colnago) |
| | Team | Sanson–Campagnolo | |

The 1978 Volta a Catalunya was the 58th edition of the Volta a Catalunya cycle race and was held from 7 to 14 September 1978. The race started and finished in Sitges. The race was won by Francesco Moser of the Sanson–Campagnolo team.

== General classification ==
Final general classification

| Rank | Rider | Team | Time |
|---|---|---|---|
| 1 | Francesco Moser (ITA) | Sanson–Campagnolo | 32h 31' 20" |
| 2 | Francisco Galdós (ESP) | Kas–Campagnolo | + 02" |
| 3 | Pedro Torres (ESP) | Teka | + 09" |
| 4 | Juan Pujol (ESP) | Kas–Campagnolo | + 1' 01" |
| 5 | Vicente Belda (ESP) | Transmallorca–Gios | + 2' 28" |
| 6 | Miguel María Lasa (ESP) | Teka | + 2' 36" |
| 7 | Ismael Lejarreta (ESP) | Kas–Campagnolo | + 8' 18" |
| 8 | Antoon Houbrechts (BEL) | Mini-Flat–Boule d'Or–Colnago | + 9' 13" |
| 9 | Claudio Bortolotto (ITA) | Sanson–Campagnolo | + 10' 38" |
| 10 | Pedro Vilardebó (ESP) | Teka | + 11' 50" |
