= 1987 Giro del Trentino =

Race details
- Dates: 6–9 May 1987
- Stages: 3 + Prologue
- Distance: 594.8 km (369.6 mi)
- Winning time: 15h 35' 16"

Results
	Winner	Claudio Corti (ITA)
	Second	Gianbattista Baronchelli (ITA)
	Third	Tony Rominger (SUI)

The 1987 Giro del Trentino was the 11th edition of the Tour of the Alps cycle race and was held on 6 May to 9 May 1987. The race started in Serrada and finished in Arco di Trentino. The race was won by Claudio Corti.

== General classification ==
Final general classification

Rank	Rider	Time
1	Claudio Corti (ITA)	15h 35' 16"
2	Gianbattista Baronchelli (ITA)	+ 4"
3	Tony Rominger (SUI)	+ 10"
4	Francesco Moser (ITA)	+ 11"
5	Raúl Alcalá (MEX)	+ 12"
6	Alberto Volpi (ITA)	+ 55"
7	Mario Beccia (ITA)	+ 57"
8	Ezio Moroni (ITA)	+ 1' 04"
9	Alberto Elli (ITA)	+ 1' 21"
10	Marco Giovannetti (ITA)	+ 1' 31"
