= 1980 Tour of Flanders =

64th Tour of Flanders
Race details
- Dates: 30 March 1980
- Stages: 1
- Distance: 265 km (165 mi)
- Winning time: 6h 36' 45"

Results
	Winner	Michel Pollentier (BEL)	(Splendor–Admiral–TV-Ekspres)
	Second	Francesco Moser (ITA)	(Sanson–Campagnolo)
	Third	Jan Raas (NED)	(TI–Raleigh–Creda)

The 64th running of the Tour of Flanders cycling classic was held on Sunday, 30 March 1980. The race was won by Belgian Michel Pollentier, after an ultimate attack from his breakaway companions Francesco Moser and Jan Raas, at 700 m from the finish in Meerbeke. 46 of 179 riders finished.

== Route ==
The race started in Sint Niklaas and finished in Meerbeke (Ninove) – covering 265 km. There were ten categorized climbs:

- Oude Kwaremont
- Koppenberg
- Taaienberg
- Eikenberg
- Volkegemberg
- Varent
- Steenberg
- Pijpketel
- Muur van Geraardsbergen
- Bosberg

== Results ==
Result
Rank	Rider	Team	Time
1	Michel Pollentier (BEL)	Splendor–Admiral–TV-Ekspres	6h 36' 45"
2	Francesco Moser (ITA)	Sanson–Campagnolo	s.t.
3	Jan Raas (NED)	TI–Raleigh–Creda	s.t.
4	Roger De Vlaeminck (BEL)	Boule d'Or–Colnago–Studio Casa	+ 20"
5	Marc Demeyer (BEL)	IJsboerke–Warncke Eis	s.t.
6	Freddy Maertens (BEL)	San Giacomo–Benotto	s.t.
7	Gilbert Duclos-Lasalle (FRA)	Peugeot–Esso–Michelin	s.t.
8	Gottfried Schmutz (SUI)	Cilo–Aufina	+ 2' 15"
9	Guy Sibille (FRA)	Peugeot–Esso–Michelin	+ 2' 40"
10	Fons De Wolf (BEL)	Boule d'Or–Colnago–Studio Casa	+ 2' 45"
