= 1979 Liège–Bastogne–Liège =

Race details
- Dates: 22 April 1979
- Stages: 1
- Distance: 241.7 km (150.2 mi)
- Winning time: 6h 35' 00"

Results
	Winner	Dietrich Thurau (FRG)	(IJsboerke–Warncke Eis)
	Second	Bernard Hinault (FRA)	(Renault–Gitane)
	Third	Daniel Willems (BEL)	(IJsboerke–Warncke Eis)

The 1979 Liège–Bastogne–Liège was the 65th edition of the Liège–Bastogne–Liège cycle race and was held on 22 April 1979. The race started and finished in Liège. The race was won by Dietrich Thurau of the IJsboerke team.

== General classification ==
Final general classification

Rank	Rider	Team	Time
1	Dietrich Thurau (FRG)	IJsboerke–Warncke Eis	6h 35' 00"
2	Bernard Hinault (FRA)	Renault–Gitane	+ 55"
3	Daniel Willems (BEL)	IJsboerke–Warncke Eis	+ 55"
4	Gianbattista Baronchelli (ITA)	Magniflex–Famcucine	+ 55"
5	Eddy Schepers (BEL)	DAF Trucks–Aida	+ 55"
6	Lucien Van Impe (BEL)	Kas–Campagnolo	+ 55"
7	Michel Pollentier (BEL)	Splendor–Euro Soap	+ 55"
8	Alfons De Wolf (BEL)	Lano–Boule d'Or	+ 55"
9	Herman Van Springel (BEL)	Marc Zeep Savon–Superia	+ 55"
10	Michel Laurent (FRA)	Renault–Gitane	+ 55"
