= 1978 UCI Road World Championships – Men's road race =

Men's Individual Road Race
1978 UCI Road World Championships
- Rainbow jersey

Race details
- Dates: 27 August 1978
- Stages: 1
- Distance: 274.8 km (170.8 mi)
- Winning time: 7h 32' 04"

Results
	Winner	Gerrie Knetemann (NED)	(Netherlands)
	Second	Francesco Moser (ITA)	(Italy)
	Third	Jørgen Marcussen (DEN)	(Denmark)

The men's road race at the 1978 UCI Road World Championships was the 45th edition of the event. The race took place on Sunday 27 August 1978 in Adenau, West Germany. The race was won by Gerrie Knetemann of the Netherlands.

== Final classification ==
General classification (1–10)

Rank	Rider	Time
1st place, gold medalist(s)	Gerrie Knetemann (NED)	7h 32' 04"
2nd place, silver medalist(s)	Francesco Moser (ITA)	+ 0"
3rd place, bronze medalist(s)	Jørgen Marcussen (DEN)	+ 20"
4	Giuseppe Saronni (ITA)	+ 28"
5	Bernard Hinault (FRA)	+ 28"
6	Joop Zoetemelk (NED)	+ 28"
7	Valerio Lualdi (ITA)	+ 39"
8	Herman Van Springel (BEL)	+ 47"
9	André Dierickx (BEL)	+ 50"
10	Roger De Vlaeminck (BEL)	+ 50"
