= 1977 UCI Road World Championships – Men's road race =

Men's Individual Road Race
1977 UCI Road World Championships
- Rainbow jersey

Race details
- Dates: 4 September 1977
- Stages: 1
- Distance: 255 km (158.4 mi)
- Winning time: 6h 36' 24"

Results
	Winner	Francesco Moser (ITA)	(Italy)
	Second	Dietrich Thurau (FRG)	(West Germany)
	Third	Franco Bitossi (ITA)	(Italy)

The men's road race at the 1977 UCI Road World Championships was the 44th edition of the event. The race took place on Sunday 4 September 1977 in San Cristóbal, Venezuela. The race was won by Francesco Moser of Italy.

== Final classification ==
General classification (1–10)

Rank	Rider	Time
1st place, gold medalist(s)	Francesco Moser (ITA)	6h 36' 24"
2nd place, silver medalist(s)	Dietrich Thurau (FRG)	+ 0"
3rd place, bronze medalist(s)	Franco Bitossi (ITA)	+ 1' 19"
4	Hennie Kuiper (NED)	+ 1' 19"
5	Domingo Perurena (ESP)	+ 1' 35"
6	André Chalmel (FRA)	+ 1' 39"
7	Jacques Esclassan (FRA)	+ 1' 41"
8	Bernard Hinault (FRA)	+ 1' 41"
9	Giuseppe Saronni (ITA)	+ 1' 41"
10	Walter Godefroot (BEL)	+ 1' 41"
