= 1985 Giro di Lombardia =

Race details
- Dates: 12 October 1985
- Stages: 1
- Distance: 255 km (158.4 mi)
- Winning time: 6h 11' 17"

Results
	Winner	Sean Kelly (IRL)	(Skil–Sem–Kas–Miko)
	Second	Adri van der Poel (NED)	(Kwantum–Decosol–Yoko)
	Third	Charly Mottet (FRA)	(Renault–Elf)

The 1985 Giro di Lombardia was the 79th edition of the Giro di Lombardia cycle race and was held on 12 October 1985. The race started in Como and finished in Milan. The race was won by Sean Kelly of the Skil team.

== General classification ==
Final general classification

Rank	Rider	Team	Time
1	Sean Kelly (IRL)	Skil–Sem–Kas–Miko	6h 11' 17"
2	Adri van der Poel (NED)	Kwantum–Decosol–Yoko	+ 0"
3	Charly Mottet (FRA)	Renault–Elf	+ 0"
~~4~~	~~Marino Lejarreta (ESP)~~	~~Alpilatte–Olmo–Cierre~~	~~+ 0"~~ (Note: Lejarreta was disqualified for a positive dope test.)
5	Leo Schönenberger (SUI)	Dromedario–Laminox–Fibok	+ 0"
6	Claudio Corti (ITA)	Supermercati Brianzoli	+ 0"
7	Silvano Contini (ITA)	Ariostea–Oece	+ 0"
8	Alfio Vandi (ITA)	Dromedario–Laminox–Fibok	+ 0"
9	Gianbattista Baronchelli (ITA)	Supermercati Brianzoli	+ 0"
10	Mario Beccia (ITA)	Malvor–Bottecchia–Vaporella	+ 0"
