= Johan De Muynck =

Belgian cyclist

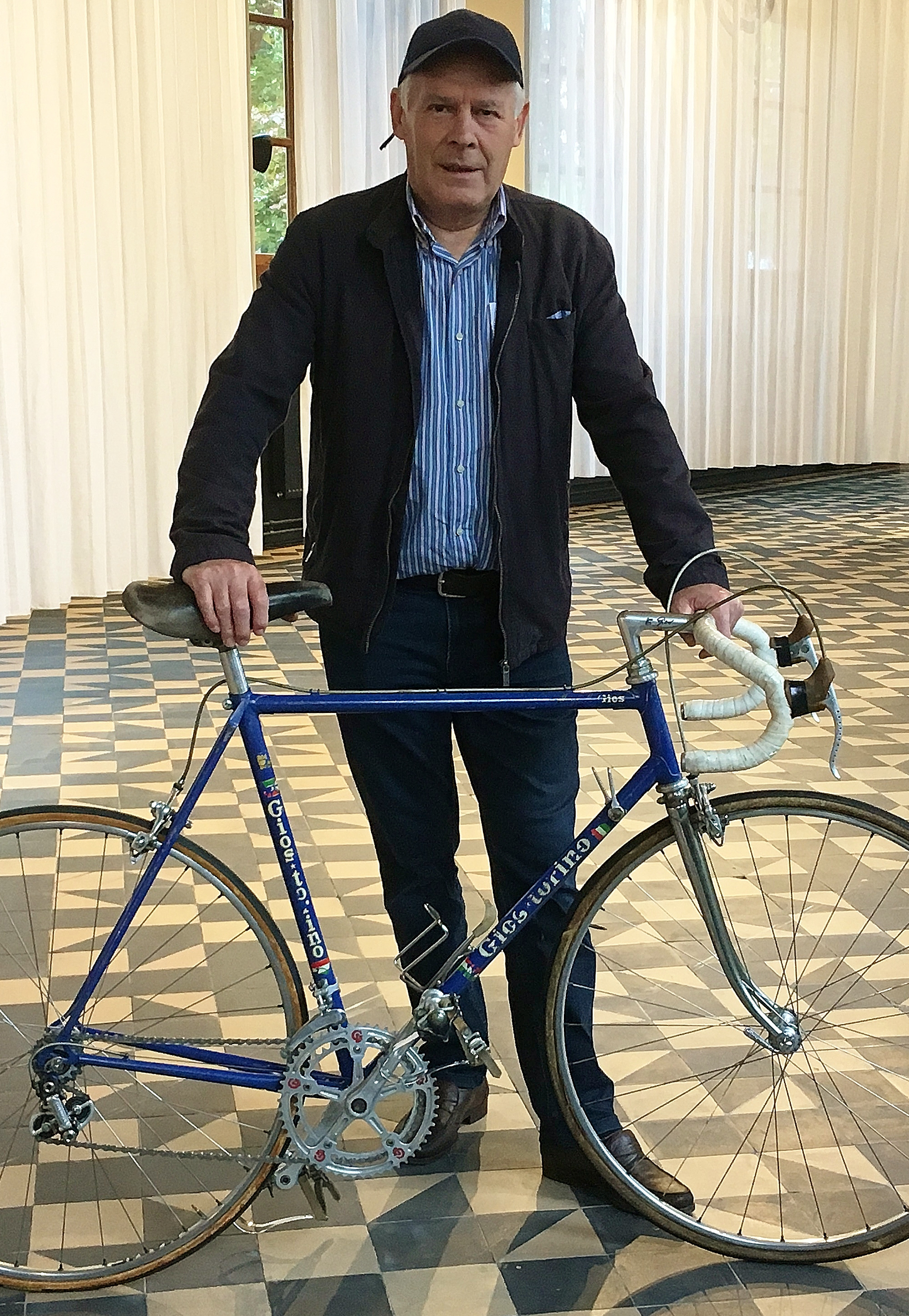
- De Muynck posing with a bike

Personal information
- Full name: Johan De Muynck
- Born: 30 May 1948 (age 78) Sleidinge, Belgium

Cycling career
- Sport: Cycling
- Discipline: Road
- Role: Rider

Professional teams
- 1971–1973: Flandria–Mars
- 1974–1977: Brooklyn
- 1978–1979: Bianchi–Faema
- 1980–1981: Splendor
- 1982–1983: La Redoute–Motobécane

Major wins
- Grand Tours Giro d'Italia General classification (1978) 2 individual stages (1976, 1978) Stage races Tour de Romandie (1976)

Johan De Muynck (born 30 May 1948) is a former Belgian professional road racing cyclist who raced from 1971 to 1983. The highlight of his career was his overall win in the 1978 Giro d'Italia. Other Grand Tour highlights include a very strong performance in the closely contested 1976 Giro d'Italia where he held the Maglia Rosa until the final time trial finishing on the podium in 2nd just nineteen seconds behind Felice Gimondi. He also rode well in the 1980 and 1981 editions of the Tour de France where he finished 4th and 7th respectively. Until Remco Evenepoel's victory at the 2022 Vuelta a España, De Muynck was the last Belgian rider to win a Grand Tour.

== Major results ==
1969
9th Flèche Ardennaise
1970
4th Ronde Van Vlaanderen Beloften
1971
3rd Scheldeprijs
8th Herinneringsprijs Dokter Tistaert – Prijs Groot-Zottegem
10th GP Flandria
10th Omloop van de Westhoek
1972
5th Overall Tour de Luxembourg
5th Omloop van de Westhoek
7th Circuit des XI Villes
9th Omloop van Oost-Vlaanderen
10th E3 Prijs Vlaanderen
1973
1st Brabantse Pijl
4th Grand Prix Impanis
4th GP Stad Vilvoorde
6th Ronde van Oost-Vlaanderen
7th GP Frans Melckenbeeck
1974
3rd Road race, National Road Championships
10th Grand Prix de Denain
1975
1st Stage 5a Tour of Belgium
7th Omloop van het Zuidwesten
7th Circuit du Sud-Ouest
10th Brabantse Pijl
10th Milano–Torino
1976
1st Overall Tour de Romandie

1st Combination classification
1st Stages 2, 4 & 5b (ITT)

2nd Overall Giro d'Italia

1st Stage 6
Held after Stages 6 & 19–21

4th Giro dell'Emilia
6th Giro dell'Appennino
7th Trofeo Matteotti
9th Trofeo Baracchi (with Osvaldo Bettoni)
1977
2nd Overall Volta a Catalunya

1st Stage 5

2nd Overall À travers Lausanne
2nd Paris–Tours
3rd Tour du Haut Var
4th Giro dell'Emilia
5th Overall Tour de Romandie
8th Overall Tour de Suisse
8th Overall Giro di Puglia
8th Giro di Lombardia
8th Giro del Veneto
1978
1st Overall Giro d'Italia

1st Stage 3

3rd Overall Tour de Romandie
5th Overall À travers Lausanne
6th Overall Giro di Puglia
7th Overall Grand Prix du Midi Libre

1st Stage 4

8th Coppa Sabatini
8th Giro del Veneto
8th Giro del Lazio
9th Overall Tirreno–Adriatico
9th Giro di Lombardia
10th Giro dell'Emilia
10th Trofeo Laigueglia
1979
6th Milano–Torino
6th Gran Premio Industria e Commercio di Prato
1980
4th Overall Tour de France
7th Overall Vuelta a España
8th Druivenkoers Overijse
8th Grand Prix Eddy Merckx
1981
1st Subida a Arrate
2nd Prueba Villafranca de Ordizia
7th Overall Tour de France
8th Overall Tour de Romandie
9th Giro di Lombardia
9th GP du Tournaisis
1983
4th Circuit des Frontières
9th Grand Prix de Denain

=== Grand Tour general classification results timeline ===
Grand Tour	1972	1973	1974	1975	1976	1977	1978	1979	1980	1981	1982	1983
Vuelta a España	—	—	—	—	—	—	—	—	7	—	—	—
Giro d'Italia	—	33	36	—	2	DNF	1	19	—	—	—	—
Tour de France	DNF	—	—	—	—	—	—	DNF	4	7	28	DNF

Legend
—	Did not compete
DNF	Did not finish
