= 1984 Milan–San Remo =

Race details
- Dates: 17 March 1984
- Stages: 1
- Distance: 294 km (183 mi)
- Winning time: 7h 22' 25"

Results
	Winner	Francesco Moser (ITA)	(Gis Gelati–Tuc Lu)
	Second	Sean Kelly (IRL)	(Skil–Reydel–Sem–Mavic)
	Third	Eric Vanderaerden (BEL)	(Panasonic–Raleigh)

The 1984 Milan–San Remo was the 75th edition of the Milan–San Remo cycle race and was held on 17 March 1984. The race started in Milan and finished in San Remo. The race was won by Francesco Moser of the Gis Gelati team.

== General classification ==
Final general classification

Rank	Rider	Team	Time
1	Francesco Moser (ITA)	Gis Gelati–Tuc Lu	7h 22' 25"
2	Sean Kelly (IRL)	Skil–Reydel–Sem–Mavic	+ 20"
3	Eric Vanderaerden (BEL)	Panasonic–Raleigh	+ 20"
4	Paolo Rosola (ITA)	Bianchi–Piaggio	+ 20"
5	Daniele Caroli (ITA)	Santini	+ 20"
6	Dag Erik Pedersen (NOR)	Murella–Rossin	+ 20"
7	Eddy Planckaert (BEL)	Panasonic–Raleigh	+ 20"
8	Noël Dejonckheere (BEL)	Teka	+ 20"
9	Siegfried Hekimi (SUI)	Dromedario–Alan	+ 20"
10	Marc Madiot (FRA)	Renault–Elf	+ 20"
