= Sigfrido Fontanelli =

Italian cyclist (1947–2004)

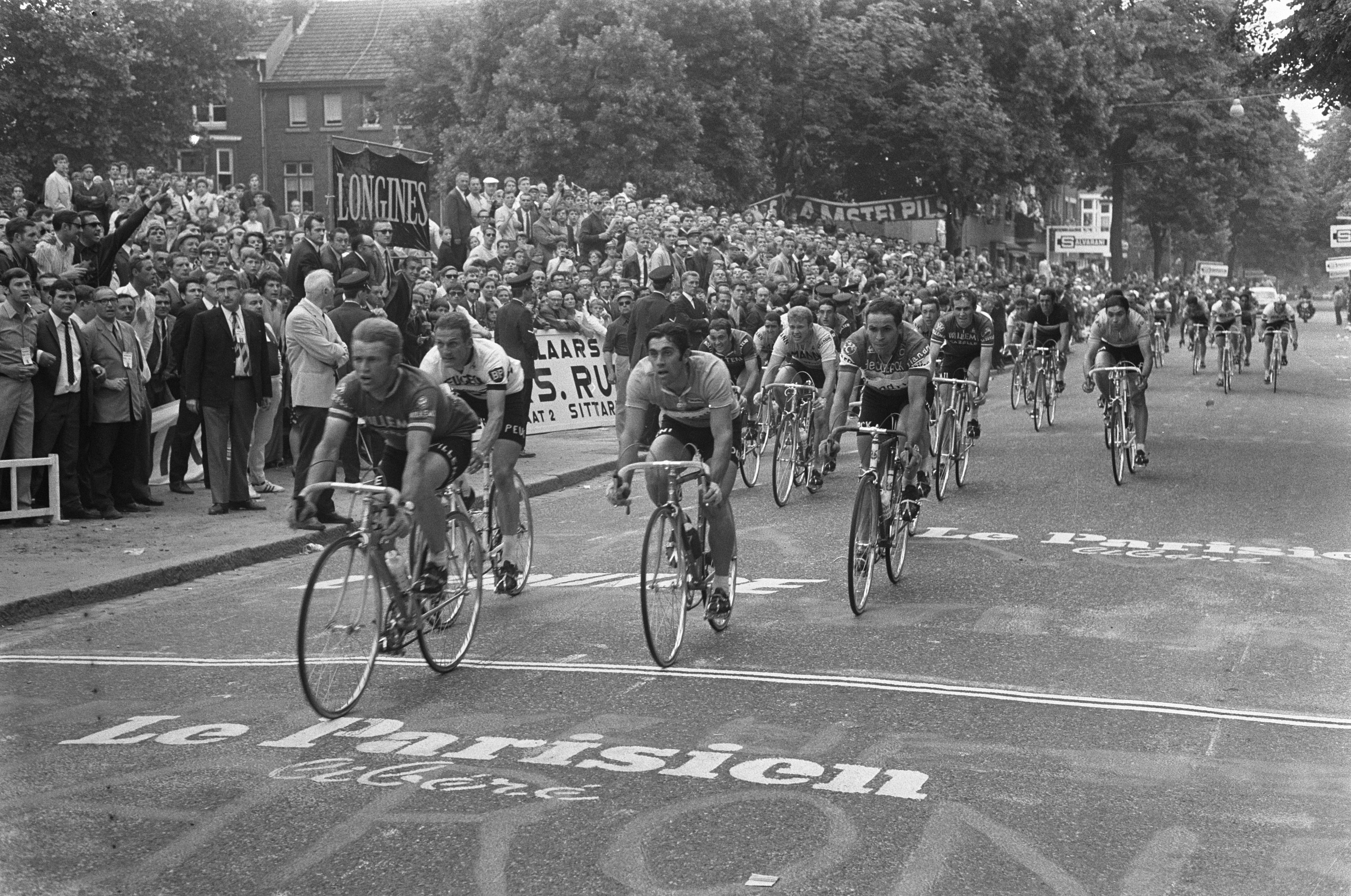

Personal information
- Born: 1 October 1947 Montelupo Fiorentino, Italy
- Died: 20 February 2004 (aged 56) Lastra a Signa, Italy

Cycling career
- Sport: Cycling
- Role: Rider

Sigfrido Fontanelli (1 October 1947 – 20 February 2004) was an Italian racing cyclist. He won stage 12 of the 1976 Giro d'Italia.
