= 1981 UCI Road World Championships – Men's road race =

Men's Individual Road Race
1981 UCI Road World Championships
- Rainbow jersey

Race details
- Dates: 30 August 1981
- Stages: 1
- Distance: 281.4 km (174.9 mi)
- Winning time: 7h 21' 59"

Results
	Winner	Freddy Maertens (BEL)	(Belgium)
	Second	Giuseppe Saronni (ITA)	(Italy)
	Third	Bernard Hinault (FRA)	(France)

The men's road race at the 1981 UCI Road World Championships was the 48th edition of the event. The race took place on Sunday 30 August 1981 in Prague, Czechoslovakia. The race was won by Freddy Maertens of Belgium.

== Final classification ==
General classification (1–10)

Rank	Rider	Time
1st place, gold medalist(s)	Freddy Maertens (BEL)	7h 21' 59"
2nd place, silver medalist(s)	Giuseppe Saronni (ITA)	+ 0"
3rd place, bronze medalist(s)	Bernard Hinault (FRA)	+ 0"
4	Gilbert Duclos-Lassalle (FRA)	+ 0"
5	Guido Van Calster (BEL)	+ 0"
6	Francesco Moser (ITA)	+ 0"
7	Alfons De Wolf (BEL)	+ 0"
8	Stefan Mutter (SUI)	+ 0"
9	Bruno Wolfer (SUI)	+ 0"
10	Pierino Gavazzi (ITA)	+ 0"
