= 1982 Milan–San Remo =

Race details
- Dates: 20 March 1982
- Stages: 1
- Distance: 294 km (183 mi)
- Winning time: 7h 04' 12"

Results
	Winner	Marc Gomez (France)	(Wolber–Spidel)
	Second	Alain Bondue (France)	(La Redoute–Motobécane)
	Third	Moreno Argentin (Italy)	(Sammontana)

The 1982 Milan–San Remo was won by relatively unknown French cyclist Marc Gomez who won after joining the early breakaway. That year was the first year the Cipressa climb was included in the race. Race organiser Vincenzo Torriani had decided the race needed to be harder, requiring another climb in its final stages.

== The race ==
From the beginning of the race a group of about 20 riders attacked, instigated by Claudio Bortolotto. By the time the race reached the bottom of the Cipressa there were only Gomez, Bortolotto and Alain Bondue left in the breakaway with an advantage of seven minutes. Gomez then attacked on the Cipressa gaining the summit a handful of seconds ahead of the other two, Bondue managed to bridge the gap while Bortolotto tired and was eventually caught by the group containing the race favourites Francesco Moser and Moreno Argentin. Bondue let Gomez lead up the Poggio (the final climb) as he knew that Gomez would have to drop him in order to win. On the technical descent of the Poggio, Bondue slipped, allowing Gomez to get a gap, this only proved decisive after Bondue slipped again. As he rode down the Via Roma in San Remo he received muted applause from the Italian tifosi that had surely been waiting for an Italian winner.

== Results ==
Final general classification

Rank	Rider	Team	Time
1	Marc Gomez (FRA)	Wolber–Spidel	7h 04' 12"
2	Alain Bondue (FRA)	La Redoute–Motobécane	+10"
3	Moreno Argentin (ITA)	Sammontana	+2' 01"
4	Francesco Moser (ITA)	Famcucine	s.t.
5	Tommy Prim (SWE)	Bianchi–Piaggio	s.t.
6	Claudio Bortolotto (ITA)	Del Tongo	s.t.
7	Silvano Contini (ITA)	Bianchi–Piaggio	s.t.
8	Patrick Versluys (BEL)	Boule d'Or–Sunair	+2' 42"
9	Leo van Vliet (NED)	TI–Raleigh–Campagnolo	+3' 35"
10	Walter Delle Case (ITA)	Atala	s.t.
