= Coppa Agostoni =

Italian one-day road cycling race

Coppa Ugo Agostoni

Race details
- Date: Mid-August
- Region: Lombardy, Italy
- English name: Cup Ugo Agostoni
- Local name: Coppa Ugo Agostoni (in Italian)
- Discipline: Road
- Competition: UCI Europe Tour
- Type: One-day
- Web site: www.coppaagostoni.it

History
- First edition: 1946
- Editions: 80 (as of 2026)
- First winner: Luigi Casola (ITA)
- Most wins: Franco Bitossi (ITA) (3 wins)
- Most recent: Paul Lapeira (FRA)

The Coppa Ugo Agostoni is a semi classic European bicycle race held in Lissone, Italy. The race is held in memory of Italian cyclist Ugo Agostoni, winner of prestigious classic Milan–San Remo, killed during World War II. It is also called Giro della Brianza. Since 2005, the race has been organised as a 1.1 event on the UCI Europe Tour.

It is the second race of Trittico Lombardo, which includes three races held around the region of Lombardy in three consecutive days. These races are Tre Valli Varesine, Coppa Ugo Agostoni and Coppa Bernocchi.

From 1946 to 1958 the race was reserved to amateurs.

== Winners ==
| Year | Country | Rider | Team |
|---|---|---|---|
| 1946 | Italy | Luigi Casola | |
| 1947 | Italy | Franco Fanti | |
| 1948 | Italy | Luigi Malabrocca | |
| 1949 | Italy | Antonio Ausenda | |
| 1950 | Italy | Giorgio Albani | |
| 1951 | Italy | Renzo Accordi | |
| 1952 | Italy | Ezio Bicocca | |
| 1953 | Italy | Andrea Barro | |
| 1954 | Italy | Aldo Moser | |
| 1955 | Italy | Lino Pizzoferrato | |
| 1956 | Italy | Silvano Tessari | |
| 1957 | Italy | Carlo Zorzoli | |
| 1958 | Italy | Giacobbe Boggian | |
| 1959 | Italy | Michele Gismondi | Tricofilina–Coppi |
| 1960 | Italy | Pietro Chiodini | Bianchi |
| 1961 | Italy | Giovanni Bettinelli | Legnano |
| 1962 | No race | | |
| 1963 | Spain | Jaime Alomar | Cite |
| 1964 | Italy | Italo Zilioli | Carpano |
| 1965 | Italy | Tommaso de Pra | Molteni |
| 1966 | Italy | Felice Gimondi | Salvarani |
| 1967 | Italy | Franco Bitossi | Filotex |
| 1968 | Italy | Claudio Michelotto | Max Meyer |
| 1969 | Italy | Franco Bitossi | Filotex |
| 1970 | Belgium | Eddy Merckx | Faemino–Faema |
| 1971 | Italy | Franco Bitossi | Filotex |
| 1972 | Italy | Mauro Simonetti | Ferretti |
| 1973 | Italy | Arnaldo Caverzasi | Filotex |
| 1974 | Italy | Felice Gimondi | Bianchi–Campagnolo |
| 1975 | Belgium | Roger De Vlaeminck | Brooklyn |
| 1976 | Belgium | Roger De Vlaeminck | Brooklyn |
| 1977 | Italy | Francesco Moser | Sanson |
| 1978 | Italy | Giuseppe Saronni | Scic |
| 1979 | Italy | Giovanni Battaglin | Inoxpran |
| 1980 | Sweden | Tommy Prim | Bianchi |
| 1981 | Italy | Francesco Moser | Famcucine |
| 1982 | Italy | Giuseppe Saronni | Del Tongo |
| 1983 | Belgium | Alfons De Wolf | Bianchi–Piaggio |
| 1984 | Italy | Franco Chioccioli | Murella–Rossin |
| 1985 | Portugal | Acácio da Silva | Malvor–Bottecchia |
| 1986 | Italy | Marino Amadori | Ecoflam–Jolly–BFB |
| 1987 | Italy | Bruno Leali | Carrera Jeans–Vagabond |
| 1988 | Italy | Gianni Bugno | Chateau d'Ax |
| 1989 | Soviet Union | Dimitri Konyshev | Alfa Lum–STM |
| 1990 | Italy | Maurizio Fondriest | Del Tongo |
| 1991 | Italy | Davide Cassani | Ariostea |
| 1992 | Italy | Stefano Colagè | ZG Mobili–Selle Italia |
| 1993 | Italy | Davide Cassani | Ariostea |
| 1994 | Italy | Oscar Pelliccioli | Team Polti–Vaporetto |
| 1995 | Italy | Gianni Bugno | MG Maglificio–Technogym |
| 1996 | Italy | Filippo Casagrande | Scrigno–Blue Storm |
| 1997 | Italy | Massimo Apollonio | Scrigno–Gaerne |
| 1998 | Italy | Andrea Tafi | Mapei–Bricobi |
| 1999 | Italy | Massimo Donati | Vini Caldirola |
| 2000 | Germany | Jan Ullrich | Team Telekom |
| 2001 | Italy | Francesco Casagrande | Fassa Bortolo |
| 2002 | France | Laurent Jalabert | CSC–Tiscali |
| 2003 | Italy | Francesco Casagrande | Lampre |
| 2004 | Italy | Leonardo Bertagnolli | Saeco |
| 2005 | Italy | Paolo Valoti | Domina Vacanze |
| 2006 | Italy | Alessandro Bertolini | Selle Italia–Diquigiovanni |
| 2007 | Italy | Alessandro Bertolini | Diquigiovanni–Selle Italia |
| 2008 | Germany | Linus Gerdemann | Team Columbia |
| 2009 | Italy | Giovanni Visconti | ISD–NERI |
| 2010 | Italy | Francesco Gavazzi | Lampre–Farnese Vini |
| 2011 | Italy | Sacha Modolo | Colnago–CSF Inox |
| 2012 | Italy | Emanuele Sella | Androni Giocattoli–Venezuela |
| 2013 | Italy | Filippo Pozzato | Lampre–Merida |
| 2014 | Italy | Niccolò Bonifazio | Lampre–Merida |
| 2015 | Italy | Davide Rebellin | CCC–Sprandi–Polkowice |
| 2016 | Italy | Sonny Colbrelli | Bardiani–CSF |
| 2017 | Switzerland | Michael Albasini | Switzerland (national team) |
| 2018 | Italy | Gianni Moscon | Team Sky |
| 2019 | Belarus | Alexandr Riabushenko | UAE Team Emirates |
| 2020 | No race due to the COVID-19 pandemic, replaced by Gran Trittico Lombardo | | |
| 2021 | Kazakhstan | Alexey Lutsenko | Astana–Premier Tech |
| 2022 | Netherlands | Sjoerd Bax | Alpecin–Deceuninck |
| 2023 | Italy | Davide Formolo | UAE Team Emirates |
| 2024 | Switzerland | Marc Hirschi | UAE Team Emirates |
| 2025 | Great Britain | Adam Yates | UAE Team Emirates XRG |
| 2026 | France | Paul Lapeira | Decathlon CMA CGM |

== Wins per country ==
| Wins | Country |
|---|---|
| 61 | Italy |
| 4 | Belgium |
| 2 | France; Germany; Switzerland |
| 1 | Spain; Sweden; Portugal; Soviet Union; Belarus; Kazakhstan; Netherlands; Great Britain |
