= 1981 Liège–Bastogne–Liège =

Race details
- Dates: 19 April 1981
- Stages: 1
- Distance: 244 km (152 mi)
- Winning time: 6h 56' 00"

Results
	Winner	Josef Fuchs (SUI)	(Cilo–Aufina)
	Second	Stefan Mutter (SUI)	(Cilo–Aufina)
	Third	–	

The 1981 Liège–Bastogne–Liège was the 67th edition of the Liège–Bastogne–Liège cycle race and was held on 19 April 1981. The race started and finished in Liège. The race was won by Josef Fuchs of the Cilo–Aufina team.

== General classification ==
Final general classification

Rank	Rider	Team	Time
DSQ	~~Johan van der Velde (NED)~~	~~TI–Raleigh–Creda~~	~~6h 56' 00"~~ (Note: Van der Velde was disqualified following a positive dope test. Third place wasn't awarded.)
1	Josef Fuchs (SUI)	Cilo–Aufina	6h 56' 00"
2	Stefan Mutter (SUI)	Cilo–Aufina	+ 50"
4	Ludo Peeters (BEL)	TI–Raleigh–Creda	+ 50"
5	Guido Van Calster (BEL)	Splendor–Wickes Bouwmarkt–Europ Decor	+ 2' 00"
6	Eddy Schepers (BEL)	DAF Trucks–Côte d'Or	+ 2' 00"
7	Rudy Pevenage (BEL)	Capri Sonne–Koga Miyata	+ 2' 54"
8	Bert Oosterbosch (NED)	TI–Raleigh–Creda	+ 2' 54"
9	Gerrie Knetemann (NED)	TI–Raleigh–Creda	+ 2' 54"
10	Frits Pirard (NED)	Boule d'Or–Sunair	+ 2' 54"
