= 1981 Giro di Lombardia =

Race details
- Dates: 17 October 1981
- Stages: 1
- Distance: 259 km (160.9 mi)
- Winning time: 6h 32' 00"

Results
	Winner	Hennie Kuiper (NED)	(DAF Trucks–Côte d'Or)
	Second	Moreno Argentin (ITA)	(Sammontana–Benotto)
	Third	Alfredo Chinetti (ITA)	(Inoxpran)

The 1981 Giro di Lombardia was the 75th edition of the Giro di Lombardia cycle race and was held on 17 October 1981. The race started in Milan and finished in Como. The race was won by Hennie Kuiper of the DAF Trucks team.

== General classification ==
Final general classification

Rank	Rider	Team	Time
1	Hennie Kuiper (NED)	DAF Trucks–Côte d'Or	6h 32' 00"
2	Moreno Argentin (ITA)	Sammontana–Benotto	+ 27"
3	Alfredo Chinetti (ITA)	Inoxpran	+ 27"
4	Jean-Marie Grezet (SUI)	Cilo–Aufina	+ 27"
5	Luciano Rabottini (ITA)	Santini–Selle Italia	+ 27"
6	Tommy Prim (SWE)	Bianchi–Piaggio	+ 27"
7	Emanuele Bombini (ITA)	Hoonved–Bottecchia–Herdal	+ 27"
8	Pascal Simon (FRA)	Peugeot–Esso–Michelin	+ 27"
9	Johan De Muynck (BEL)	Splendor–Wickes Bouwmarkt–Europ Decor	+ 27"
10	Claude Criquielion (BEL)	Splendor–Wickes Bouwmarkt–Europ Decor	+ 27"
