= 1976 Giro d'Italia =

Race details
- Dates: 21 May – 12 June 1976
- Stages: 22
- Distance: 4,161 km (2,586 mi)
- Winning time: 119h 58' 15"

Results
Jersey awarded to the overall winner	Winner	Felice Gimondi (ITA)	(Bianchi-Campagnolo)
	Second	Johan De Muynck (BEL)	(Brooklyn)
	Third	Fausto Bertoglio (ITA)	(Jolly Ceramica)
Jersey awarded to the points classification winner	Points	Francesco Moser (ITA)	(Sanson)
Jersey awarded to the mountains classification winner	Mountains	Andrés Oliva (ESP)	(KAS)
	Youth	Alfio Vandi (ITA)	(Magniflex)
	Combination	Francesco Moser (ITA)	(Sanson)
	Team	Brooklyn	

The 1976 Giro d'Italia was the 59th running of the Giro, one of cycling's Grand Tours. It started in Catania, on 21 May, with a set of split stages and concluded in Milan, on 12 June, with another split stage, consisting of an individual time trial and a mass-start stage. A total of 120 riders from twelve teams entered the 22-stage race, that was won by Italian Felice Gimondi of the Bianchi-Campagnolo team. The second and third places were taken by Belgian Johan De Muynck and Italian Fausto Bertoglio, respectively.

Amongst the other classifications that the race awarded, Sanson's Francesco Moser won the points classification, Andrés Oliva of KAS won the mountains classification, and Magniflex's Alfio Vandi completed the Giro as the best neo-professional in the general classification, finishing seventh overall. Brooklyn finishing as the winners of the team points classification. The race was marred by the death of Spanish rider Juan Manuel Santisteban during the first stage.

== Teams ==
A total of twelve teams were invited to participate in the 1976 Giro d'Italia. In total, 70 riders were from Italy, while the remaining 50 riders came from: Spain (20), Belgium (17), the Netherlands (3), Denmark (2), Portugal (2), Switzerland (2), Australia (1), Germany (1), Great Britain (1), and Norway (1). Each team sent a squad of ten riders, which meant that the race started with a peloton of 120 cyclists.

Of those starting, 30 were riding the Giro d'Italia for the first time. The average age of riders was 27.75 years, ranging from 20–year–old Alfio Vandi (Magniflex) to 38–year–old Ventura Díaz (Teka). The team with the youngest average rider age was Magniflex (25), while the oldest was Brooklyn (29). From those that started, 86 made it to the finish in Milan.

The teams entering the race were:

- Jolly Ceramica
- Bianchi-Campagnolo
- Brooklyn
- Furzi-Vibor
- G.B.C. TV-Color
- KAS
- Magniflex
- Molteni
- Sanson
- Scic
- Teka
- Zonca-Santini

== Route and stages ==
The route for the race was revealed on 30 January 1976, while a final draft of the race was released on 13 April 1976.

Stage results
Stage	Date	Course	Distance	Type	Winner
1a	21 May	Catania to Catania	64 km (40 mi)	Plain stage	Patrick Sercu (BEL)
1b	21 May	Catania to Siracusa	78 km (48 mi)	Plain stage	Patrick Sercu (BEL)
2	22 May	Siracusa to Caltanissetta	210 km (130 mi)	Plain stage	Roger De Vlaeminck (BEL)
3	23 May	Caltanissetta to Palermo	163 km (101 mi)	Stage with mountain(s)	Rik Van Linden (BEL)
4	24 May	Cefalù to Messina	192 km (119 mi)	Stage with mountain(s)	Francesco Moser (ITA)
5	25 May	Reggio Calabria to Cosenza	220 km (137 mi)	Stage with mountain(s)	Roger De Vlaeminck (BEL)
6	26 May	Cosenza to Matera	207 km (129 mi)	Plain stage	Johan De Muynck (BEL)
7	27 May	Ostuni to Ostuni	37 km (23 mi)	Individual time trial	Francesco Moser (ITA)
8	28 May	Selva di Fasano to Lago Laceno	256 km (159 mi)	Plain stage	Roger De Vlaeminck (BEL)
9	29 May	Bagnoli Irpino to Roccaraso	204 km (127 mi)	Stage with mountain(s)	Fabrizio Fabbri (ITA)
10	30 May	Roccaraso to Terni	203 km (126 mi)	Plain stage	Patrick Sercu (BEL)
11	31 May	Terni to Gabicce Mare	222 km (138 mi)	Plain stage	Antonio Menéndez (ESP)
12	1 June	Gabicce Mare to Porretta Terme	215 km (134 mi)	Stage with mountain(s)	Sigfrido Fontanelli (ITA)
13	2 June	Porretta Terme to Il Ciocco	146 km (91 mi)	Stage with mountain(s)	Ronny De Witte (BEL)
14	3 June	Il Ciocco to Varazze	227 km (141 mi)	Stage with mountain(s)	Francesco Moser (ITA)
	4 June	Rest day			
15	5 June	Varazze to Ozegna	216 km (134 mi)	Stage with mountain(s)	Rik Van Linden (BEL)
16	6 June	Castellamonte to Arosio	258 km (160 mi)	Stage with mountain(s)	Roger De Vlaeminck (BEL)
17	7 June	Arosio to Verona	196 km (122 mi)	Plain stage	Ercole Gualazzini (ITA)
18	8 June	Verona to Longarone	174 km (108 mi)	Plain stage	Simone Fraccaro (ITA)
19	9 June	Longarone to Vajolet Towers	132 km (82 mi)	Stage with mountain(s)	Andrés Gandarias (ESP)
20	10 June	Vigo di Fassa to Terme di Comano	170 km (106 mi)	Stage with mountain(s)	Luciano Conati (ITA)
21	11 June	Terme di Comano to Bergamo	238 km (148 mi)	Stage with mountain(s)	Felice Gimondi (ITA)
22a	12 June	Arcore to Arcore	28 km (17 mi)	Individual time trial	Joseph Bruyère (BEL)
22b	12 June	Milan to Milan	106 km (66 mi)	Plain stage	Daniele Tinchella (ITA)
	Total		4,161 km (4,161 km)		

== Race overview ==
During the stage 1A on 21 May, Juan Manuel Santisteban crashed and hit his head, ultimately dying from his injuries. The Giro organisation allowed his team to let another rider take his place, but the team had no rider available so this was not done.

Patrick Sercu would win both stage 1A and 1B, Roger de Vlaeminck would win stage 2 and the two of them would alternate between wearing the leader's jersey depending on the tie-breakers following the first few stages. De Muynck took over the lead after winning stage 6 by 0:21 over the main field following a crash which left him alone at the front as a group of eight riders were now tied for 2nd in the overall standings :05 behind. The time trial in Stage 7 was won by Francesco Moser with Gimondi placing 2nd seven seconds behind putting Moser into the Maglia Rosa as the overall leader and Gimondi in 2nd seven seconds behind Stage 8 was won by de Vlaeminck as Eddy Merckx crossed the line in 2nd which would be his highest stage placing in this final Giro of his remarkable career. Gimondi crossed in 3rd and while he was by no means a favorite for overall victory, because Moser lost nearly a minute Gimondi would wear the Pink Jersey for the first time since the 1969 Giro.

Over the next ten stages Gimondi maintained his overall lead but on stage 19 Johan de Muynck was able to get away from him and he took over the lead by 0:16. Stage 21 was the final day in the mountains where Merckx took 2nd and Gimondi won the stage. De Muynck finished 9th, but finished in the same time so the overall situation remained the same. Stage 22a was the final ITT and it was here that Gimondi won the Giro. He finished in 6th place 0:43 behind stage winner Joseph Bruyere but 0:44 ahead of de Muynck effectively making him the winner by 0:19.

== Classification leadership ==
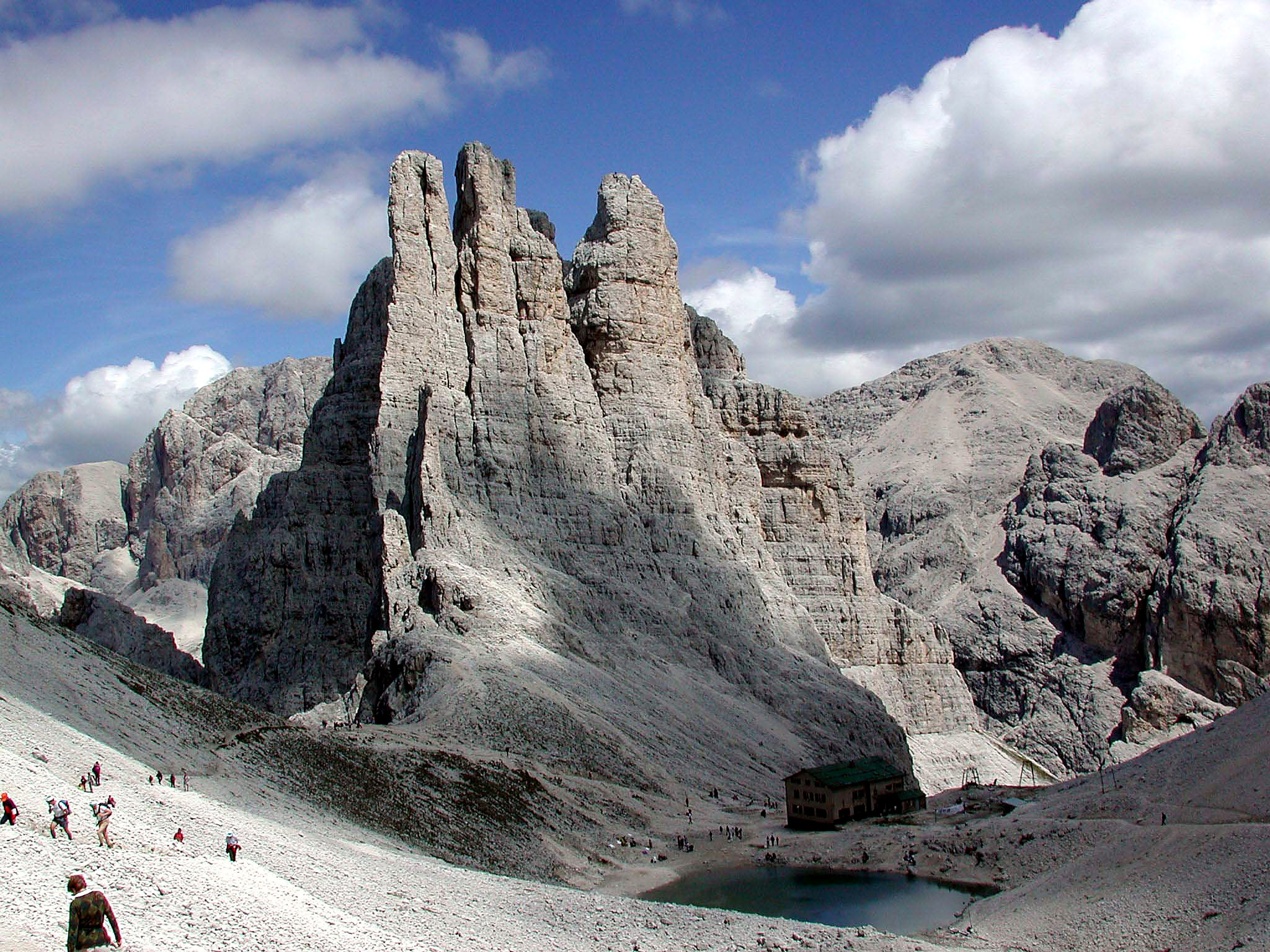
The Vajolet Towers was the finish of stage 19 for the 1976 running of the Giro d'Italia.

There were four main individual classifications contested in the 1976 Giro d'Italia, as well as a team competition. Four of them awarded jerseys to their leaders. The general classification was the most important and was calculated by adding each rider's finishing times on each stage. The rider with the lowest cumulative time was the winner of the general classification and was considered the overall winner of the Giro. The rider leading the classification wore a pink jersey to signify the classification's leadership.

The second classification was the points classification. Riders received points for finishing in the top positions in a stage finish, with first place getting the most points, and lower placings getting successively fewer points. The rider leading this classification wore a purple (or cyclamen) jersey.

The mountains classification was the third classification and its leader was denoted by the green jersey. In this ranking, points were won by reaching the summit of a climb ahead of other cyclists. Each climb was ranked as either first, second or third category, with more points available for higher category climbs. Most stages of the race included one or more categorized climbs, in which points were awarded to the riders that reached the summit first. The Cima Coppi, the race's highest point of elevation, awarded more points than the other first category climbs. The Cima Coppi for this Giro was the Sella Pass, which was crossed first by Spanish rider Andrés Gandarias during stage 19.

The fourth classification, the young rider classification, was a ranking decided the same way as the general classification, but only considered neo-professional cyclists (in their first three years of professional racing).

The final important classification, the team classification, awarded no jersey to its leaders. This was calculated by adding together points earned by each rider on the team during each stage through the intermediate sprints, the categorized climbs, stage finishes, etc. The team with the most points led the classification.

There were other minor classifications within the race, including the Campionato delle Regioni classification. The leader wore a blue jersey with colored vertical stripes ("maglia azzurra con banda tricolore verticale"). On every intermediate sprint, the first three riders scored points.

New to the race for the 1976 edition was the Fiat 131 classification. In all stages longer than 131 km (81 mi), there would be a banner in the stage 131 km after the start or 131 km before the finish to designate a special sprint. The winner of the sprint in each stage received a Fiat 131.

Classification leadership by stage
Stage	Winner	General classification	Points classification	Mountains classification	Young rider classification	Campionato delle Regioni	FIAT	Team classification
1a	Patrick Sercu	Patrick Sercu	not awarded	not awarded	?	?	not awarded	not awarded
1b	Patrick Sercu	Patrick Sercu	Patrick Sercu	not awarded	?	?	not awarded	Brooklyn
2	Roger De Vlaeminck	Roger De Vlaeminck	Patrick Sercu	not awarded	?	?	Giacinto Santambrogio	Brooklyn
3	Rik Van Linden	Patrick Sercu	Patrick Sercu	Eddy Merckx	?	?	Giacinto Santambrogio	Brooklyn
4	Francesco Moser	Roger De Vlaeminck	Roger De Vlaeminck	Eddy Merckx	?	Giacinto Santambrogio	Giacinto Santambrogio	Brooklyn
5	Roger De Vlaeminck	Roger De Vlaeminck	Roger De Vlaeminck	Eddy Merckx	?	Giacinto Santambrogio	Giacinto Santambrogio	Brooklyn
6	Johan De Muynck	Johan De Muynck	Roger De Vlaeminck	Eddy Merckx	?	?	Giacinto Santambrogio	Brooklyn
7	Francesco Moser	Francesco Moser	Roger De Vlaeminck	Eddy Merckx	?	?	Giacinto Santambrogio	Brooklyn
8	Roger De Vlaeminck	Felice Gimondi	Roger De Vlaeminck	Eddy Merckx	?	?	Tullio Rossi	Brooklyn
9	Fabrizio Fabbri	Felice Gimondi	Roger De Vlaeminck	Fabrizio Fabbri	?	?	Tullio Rossi	Brooklyn
10	Patrick Sercu	Felice Gimondi	Roger De Vlaeminck	Fabrizio Fabbri	?	?	Tullio Rossi	Brooklyn
11	Antonio Menéndez	Felice Gimondi	Roger De Vlaeminck	Fabrizio Fabbri	?	?	Tullio Rossi	Brooklyn
12	Sigfrido Fontanelli	Felice Gimondi	Roger De Vlaeminck	Fabrizio Fabbri	?	?	Tullio Rossi	Brooklyn
13	Ronny De Witte	Felice Gimondi	Roger De Vlaeminck	Fabrizio Fabbri	?	?	Tullio Rossi	Brooklyn
14	Francesco Moser	Felice Gimondi	Roger De Vlaeminck	Andrés Oliva	?	?	Tullio Rossi	Brooklyn
15	Rik Van Linden	Felice Gimondi	Roger De Vlaeminck	Andrés Oliva	?	Giacinto Santambrogio	Tullio Rossi	Brooklyn
16	Roger De Vlaeminck	Felice Gimondi	Roger De Vlaeminck	Andrés Oliva	?	Giacinto Santambrogio	Tullio Rossi	Brooklyn
17	Ercole Gualazzini	Felice Gimondi	Roger De Vlaeminck	Andrés Oliva	?	Giacinto Santambrogio	Tullio Rossi	Brooklyn
18	Simone Fraccaro	Felice Gimondi	Roger De Vlaeminck	Andrés Oliva	?	Giacinto Santambrogio	Tullio Rossi	Brooklyn
19	Andrés Gandarias	Johan De Muynck	Roger De Vlaeminck	Andrés Oliva	Alfio Vandi	Giacinto Santambrogio	Tullio Rossi	Brooklyn
20	Luciano Conati	Johan De Muynck	Francesco Moser	Andrés Oliva	Alfio Vandi	Giacinto Santambrogio	Tullio Rossi	Brooklyn
21	Felice Gimondi	Johan De Muynck	Francesco Moser	Andrés Oliva	Alfio Vandi	Giacinto Santambrogio	Tullio Rossi	Brooklyn
22a	Joseph Bruyère	Felice Gimondi	Francesco Moser	Andrés Oliva	Alfio Vandi	Giacinto Santambrogio	Tullio Rossi	Brooklyn
22b	Daniele Tinchella	Felice Gimondi	Francesco Moser	Andrés Oliva	Alfio Vandi	Giacinto Santambrogio	Tullio Rossi	Brooklyn
Final		Felice Gimondi	Francesco Moser	Andrés Oliva	Alfio Vandi	Giacinto Santambrogio	Tullio Rossi	Brooklyn

== Final standings ==
Legend
Pink jersey	Denotes the winner of the General classification
Purple jersey	Denotes the winner of the Points classification
Green jersey	Denotes the winner of the Mountains classification
Blue jersey	Denotes the winner of the Campionato delle Regioni classification

=== General classification ===
Final general classification (1–10)
Rank	Name	Team	Time
1	Felice Gimondi (ITA)	Bianchi-Campagnolo	119 h 58' 16"
2	Johan de Muynck (BEL)	Brooklyn	+ 19"
3	Fausto Bertoglio (ITA)	Jolly Ceramica	+ 49"
4	Francesco Moser (ITA)	Sanson	+ 1' 07"
5	Gianbattista Baronchelli (ITA)	Scic	+ 1' 35"
6	Wladimiro Panizza (ITA)	Scic	+ 2' 35"
7	Alfio Vandi (ITA)	Magniflex	+ 4' 07"
8	Eddy Merckx (BEL)	Molteni	+ 7' 40"
9	Walter Riccomi (ITA)	Scic	+ 8' 49"
10	Juan Pujol Pagés (ESP)	KAS	+ 8' 50"

=== Points classification ===
Final points classification (1-5)
	Rider	Team	Points
1	Francesco Moser (ITA)	Sanson	272
2	Eddy Merckx (BEL)	Molteni	149
3	Felice Gimondi (ITA)	Bianchi-Campagnolo	143
4	Pierino Gavazzi (ITA)	Jolly Ceramica	122
5	Enrico Paolini (ITA)	Scic	110

=== Mountains classification ===
Final mountains classification (1-5)
	Rider	Team	Points
1	Andrés Oliva (ESP)	Zonca	535
2	Andrés Gandarias (ESP)	Teka	390
3	Francesco Moser (ITA)	Sanson	270
4	Fabrizio Fabbri (ITA)	Bianchi-Campagnolo	210
5	Wladimiro Panizza (ITA)	Scic	195

=== Young rider classification ===
Final young rider classification (1-3)
	Rider	Team	Time
1	Alfio Vandi (ITA)	Magniflex	120h 02' 22"
2	Juan Pujol Pagés (ESP)	KAS	+ 4' 43"
3	Ruggero Gialdini (ITA)	Magniflex	+ 32' 32"

=== Combination classification ===
Final combination classification (1-3)
	Rider	Team	Points
1	Francesco Moser (ITA)	Sanson	12
2	Eddy Merckx (BEL)	Molteni	31
3	Arnaldo Caverzasi (ITA)	Scic	52

=== Campionato delle Regioni classification ===
Final Campionato delle Regioni classification (1-3)
	Rider	Team	Points
1	Giacinto Santambrogio (ITA)	Bianchi-Campagnolo	35
2	Arnaldo Caverzasi (ITA)	Scic	33
3	Frans Van Looy (BEL)	Molteni	28

=== Premio 131 Fiat classification ===
Final Premio 131 Fiat classification (1-3)
	Rider	Team	Points
1	Tullio Rossi (ITA)	Furzi-Vibor	39
2	Fabrizio Fabbri (ITA)	Bianchi-Campagnolo	23
3	Giacinto Santambrogio (ITA)	Bianchi-Campagnolo	12

=== Team points classification ===
Final team points classification (1-3)
	Team	Points
1	Brooklyn	11,035
2	Bianchi-Campagnolo	7,315
3	Sanson	5,915

== Doping ==
There was one positive doping test in the Giro of 1976: Cees Bal tested positive for strychnin after the sixth stage, and got a penalty of ten minutes in the general classification.
