= Filotex =

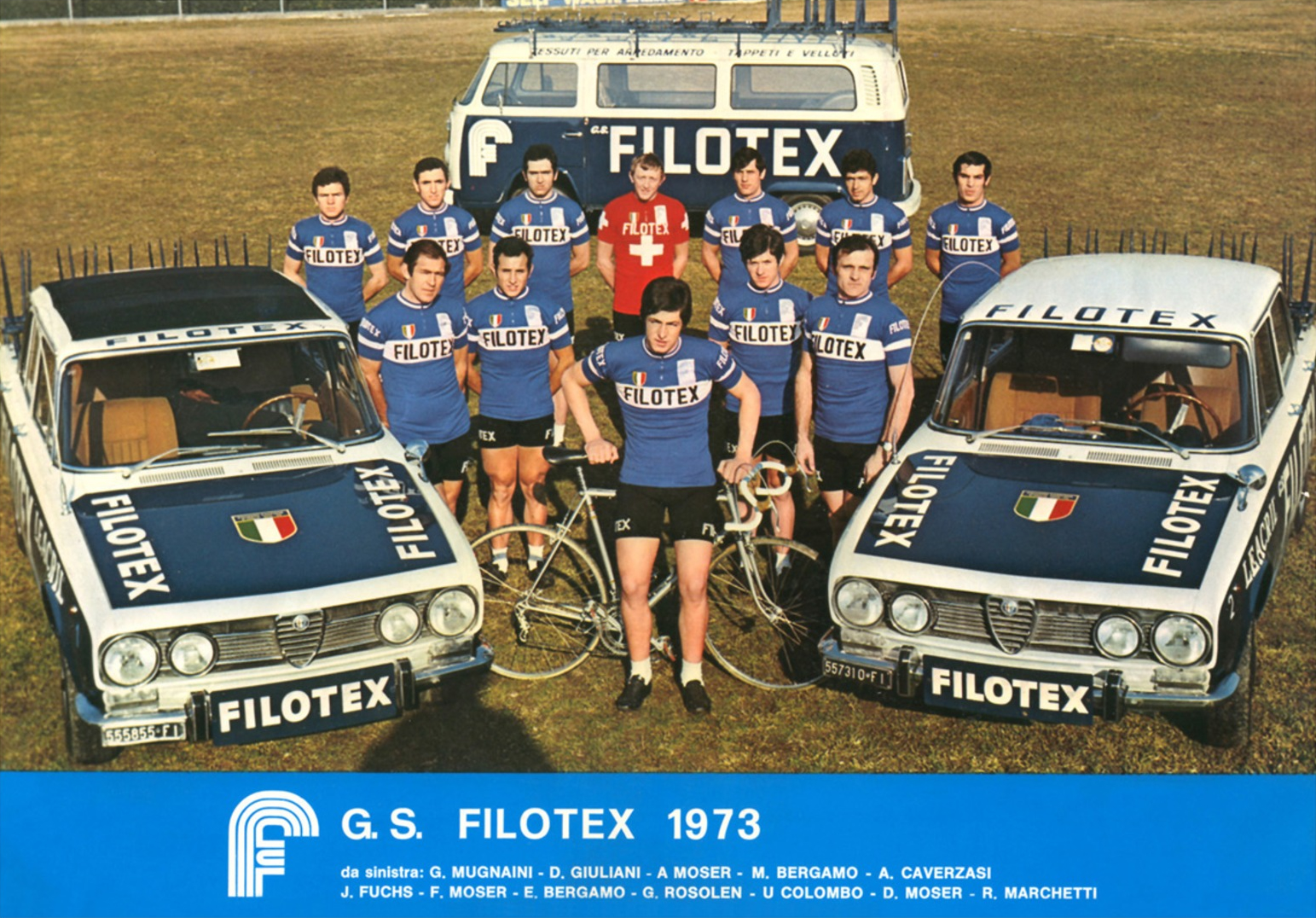
- The Filotex team of 1973

Team information
- Registered: Italy
- Founded: 1963
- Disbanded: 1980
- Discipline: Road

Team name history
- 1963–1965 1965–1975 1976–1977 1978 1979 1980: Springoil–Fuchs; Filotex; Sanson; Sanson–Campagnolo; Sanson–Luxor TV–Campagnolo; Sanson–Campagnolo

Filotex was an Italian professional cycling team that existed from 1963 to 1980. The team's main sponsor from 1976 to 1980 was Italian food producer Sanson.

== History ==
Throughout the 1960s and 1970s, Filotex riders such as Italo Zilioli, Ugo Colombo, and Franco Bitossi consistently placed in the top 10 at the Giro d'Italia. At the 1969 Giro, Zilioli, Colombo, and Bitossi placed in the top 10 of the general classification, with Bitossi winning the points classification.
