= List of teams and cyclists in the 1979 Tour de France =

List of cyclists

In the 1979 Tour de France, the following 15 teams each sent 10 cyclists, for a total of 150:

- Renault–Gitane
- Miko–Mercier
- Flandria–Ça va seul
- TI–Raleigh
- Kas
- La Redoute–Motobécane
- Peugeot–Esso
- Teka
- Fiat–La France
- IJsboerke–Warncke
- Splendor
- Bianchi–Faema
- Daf Trucks
- Inoxpran
- Magniflex–Famcucine

The big favourite was Hinault; not only was he the defending champion, but the large number of time trials made the race especially suited for him. The only cyclist thought to be able to seriously challenge Hinault was Zoetemelk, the runner-up of the previous edition.

== Start list ==
=== By team ===
Renault–Gitane
No.	Rider	Pos.
1	Bernard Hinault (FRA)	1
2	Hubert Arbès (FRA)	74
3	Bernard Becaas (FRA)	42
4	Jean-René Bernaudeau (FRA)	5
5	André Chalmel (FRA)	59
6	Jean Chassang (FRA)	35
7	Gilbert Chaumaz (FRA)	DNF
8	Lucien Didier (LUX)	29
9	Maurice Le Guilloux (FRA)	47
10	Pierre-Raymond Villemiane (FRA)	13

Miko–Mercier
No.	Rider	Pos.
11	Joop Zoetemelk (NED)	2
12	Patrick Friou (FRA)	53
13	Joël Gallopin (FRA)	67
14	Jean-Louis Gauthier (FRA)	50
15	Christian Levavasseur (FRA)	51
16	Raymond Martin (FRA)	24
17	Hubert Mathis (FRA)	49
18	André Mollet (FRA)	70
19	Sven-Åke Nilsson (SWE)	12
20	Christian Seznec (FRA)	22

Flandria–Ça va seul
No.	Rider	Pos.
21	Joaquim Agostinho (POR)	3
22	René Bittinger (FRA)	26
23	Patrick Bonnet (FRA)	62
24	Marc Demeyer (BEL)	57
25	Hendrik Devos (BEL)	31
26	Jos Deschoenmaecker (BEL)	21
27	René Martens (BEL)	25
28	Jacques Michaud (FRA)	40
29	Patrice Thévenard (FRA)	69
30	Pol Verschuere (BEL)	71

TI–Raleigh
No.	Rider	Pos.
31	Gerrie Knetemann (NED)	30
32	Henk Lubberding (NED)	18
33	Stefan Mutter (SUI)	75
34	Bert Pronk (NED)	44
35	Jan Raas (NED)	DNF
36	Ueli Sutter (SUI)	DNF
37	Johan van der Velde (NED)	14
38	Leo van Vliet (NED)	DNF
39	Paul Wellens (BEL)	8
40	Wilfried Wesemael (BEL)	DNF

Kas
No.	Rider	Pos.
41	Lucien Van Impe (BEL)	11
42	Bernardo Alfonsel (ESP)	78
43	Joseph Borguet (BEL)	43
44	Claude Criquielion (BEL)	9
45	René Dillen (BEL)	61
46	Francisco Galdós (ESP)	28
47	Rafael Ladrón de Guevara (ESP)	DNF
48	Willy Teirlinck (BEL)	56
49	Pedro Vilardebo (ESP)	DNF
50	Frans Van Looy (BEL)	DNF

La Redoute–Motobécane
No.	Rider	Pos.
51	Mariano Martínez (FRA)	16
52	Pierre Bazzo (FRA)	33
53	Christian Jourdan (FRA)	68
54	Gérard Macé (FRA)	DNF
55	Jean-Marie Michel (FRA)	72
56	Alain Patritti (FRA)	DNF
57	Jean-François Pescheux (FRA)	73
58	Christian Poirier (FRA)	DNF
59	Didier Vanoverschelde (FRA)	41
60	Bernard Vallet (FRA)	20

Peugeot–Esso
No.	Rider	Pos.
61	Hennie Kuiper (NED)	4
62	Jacques Bossis (FRA)	60
63	Bernard Bourreau (FRA)	79
64	José De Cauwer (BEL)	85
65	Gilbert Duclos-Lassalle (FRA)	46
66	Jacques Esclassan (FRA)	DNF
67	Yves Hézard (FRA)	17
68	Michel Laurent (FRA)	37
69	Roger Legeay (FRA)	63
70	Patrick Perret (FRA)	DNF

Teka
No.	Rider	Pos.
71	Manuel Esparza (ESP)	DNF
72	Faustino Fernández Ovies (ESP)	DNF
73	Eulalio García Pereda (ESP)	86
74	Miguel Gutiérrez (ESP)	DNF
75	Jürgen Kraft (FRG)	DNF
76	Vicente López Carril (ESP)	DNF
77	Andrés Oliva (ESP)	83
78	José Pesarrodona (ESP)	DNF
79	Dominique Sanders (FRA)	84
80	José Viejo (ESP)	DNF

Fiat–La France
No.	Rider	Pos.
81	Robert Alban (FRA)	19
82	Michel Balbuena (FRA)	65
83	Serge Beucherie (FRA)	87
84	Didier Bourrier (FRA)	DNF
85	Alain De Carvalho (FRA)	55
86	Ferdinand Julien (FRA)	52
87	Gilbert Lelay (FRA)	80
88	Alain Meslet (FRA)	34
89	Philippe Tesnière (FRA)	DNF
90	Paul Sherwen (GBR)	81

IJsboerke–Warncke
No.	Rider	Pos.
91	Dietrich Thurau (FRG)	10
92	Rudy Colman (BEL)	DNF
93	Ludo Delcroix (BEL)	39
94	Fedor den Hertog (NED)	48
95	André Dierickx (BEL)	DNF
96	Jos Jacobs (BEL)	45
97	Ludo Peeters (BEL)	36
98	Rudy Pevenage (BEL)	23
99	Jos Van de Poel (BEL)	DNF
100	Gery Verlinden (BEL)	DNF

Splendor
No.	Rider	Pos.
101	Michel Pollentier (BEL)	DNF
102	Herman Beysens (BEL)	DNF
103	Alain Desaever (BEL)	DNF
104	Christian Dumont (BEL)	DNF
105	Paul Jesson (NZL)	DNF
106	Sean Kelly (IRL)	38
107	Ludo Loos (BEL)	DNF
108	Liévin Malfait (BEL)	DNF
109	Wim Myngheer (BEL)	76
110	Roger Verschaeve (BEL)	DNF

Bianchi–Faema
No.	Rider	Pos.
111	Johan De Muynck (BEL)	DNF
112	Giovanni Cavalcanti (ITA)	DNF
113	Aldo Donadello (ITA)	DNF
114	Knut Knudsen (NOR)	27
115	Valerio Lualdi (ITA)	DNF
116	Serge Parsani (ITA)	66
117	Alessandro Pozzi (ITA)	32
118	Glauco Santoni (ITA)	54
119	Alex Van Linden (BEL)	88
120	Rik Van Linden (BEL)	DNF

Daf Trucks
No.	Rider	Pos.
121	Eddy Schepers (BEL)	15
122	Maurizio Bellet (ITA)	82
123	Emiel De Haes (BEL)	DNF
124	Jo Maas (NED)	7
125	Robert Mintkiewicz (FRA)	DNF
126	Patrick Pevenage (BEL)	DNF
127	Gerhard Schönbacher (AUT)	89
128	William Tackaert (BEL)	DNF
129	Guido Van Calster (BEL)	58
130	Jaak Verbrugge (NED)	DNF

Inoxpran
No.	Rider	Pos.
131	Giovanni Battaglin (ITA)	6
132	Nazzareno Berto (ITA)	DNF
133	Patrick Busolini (FRA)	DNF
134	Gianfranco Foresti (ITA)	DNF
135	Bruno Leali (ITA)	77
136	Riccardo Magrini (ITA)	DNF
137	Giovanni Mantovani (ITA)	DNF
138	Luigino Moro (ITA)	DNF
139	Pasquale Pugliese (ITA)	DNF
140	Dorino Vanzo (ITA)	64

Magniflex–Famcucine
No.	Rider	Pos.
141	Gianbattista Baronchelli (ITA)	DNF
142	Gaetano Baronchelli (ITA)	DNF
143	Per Bausager (DEN)	DNF
144	Roberto Ceruti (ITA)	DNF
145	Bernt Johansson (SWE)	DNF
146	Jørgen Marcussen (DEN)	DNF
147	Ignazio Paleari (ITA)	DNF
148	Walter Polini (ITA)	DNF
149	Amilcare Sgalbazzi (ITA)	DNF
150	Alfio Vandi (ITA)	DNF

=== By rider ===
Legend
No.	Starting number worn by the rider during the Tour
Pos.	Position in the general classification
DNF	Denotes a rider who did not finish

No.	Name	Nationality	Team	Pos.	Ref
1	Bernard Hinault	France	Renault–Gitane	1	
2	Hubert Arbès	France	Renault–Gitane	74	
3	Bernard Becaas	France	Renault–Gitane	42	
4	Jean-René Bernaudeau	France	Renault–Gitane	5	
5	André Chalmel	France	Renault–Gitane	59	
6	Jean Chassang	France	Renault–Gitane	35	
7	Gilbert Chaumaz	France	Renault–Gitane	DNF	
8	Lucien Didier	Luxembourg	Renault–Gitane	29	
9	Maurice Le Guilloux	France	Renault–Gitane	47	
10	Pierre-Raymond Villemiane	France	Renault–Gitane	13	
11	Joop Zoetemelk	Netherlands	Miko–Mercier	2	
12	Patrick Friou	France	Miko–Mercier	53	
13	Joël Gallopin	France	Miko–Mercier	67	
14	Jean-Louis Gauthier	France	Miko–Mercier	50	
15	Christian Levavasseur	France	Miko–Mercier	51	
16	Raymond Martin	France	Miko–Mercier	24	
17	Hubert Mathis	France	Miko–Mercier	49	
18	André Mollet	France	Miko–Mercier	70	
19	Sven-Åke Nilsson	Sweden	Miko–Mercier	12	
20	Christian Seznec	France	Miko–Mercier	22	
21	Joaquim Agostinho	Portugal	Flandria–Ça va seul	3	
22	René Bittinger	France	Flandria–Ça va seul	26	
23	Patrick Bonnet	France	Flandria–Ça va seul	62	
24	Marc Demeyer	Belgium	Flandria–Ça va seul	57	
25	Hendrik Devos	Belgium	Flandria–Ça va seul	31	
26	Jos Deschoenmaecker	Belgium	Flandria–Ça va seul	21	
27	René Martens	Belgium	Flandria–Ça va seul	25	
28	Jacques Michaud	France	Flandria–Ça va seul	40	
29	Patrice Thévenard	France	Flandria–Ça va seul	69	
30	Pol Verschuere	Belgium	Flandria–Ça va seul	71	
31	Gerrie Knetemann	Netherlands	TI–Raleigh	30	
32	Henk Lubberding	Netherlands	TI–Raleigh	18	
33	Stefan Mutter	Switzerland	TI–Raleigh	75	
34	Bert Pronk	Netherlands	TI–Raleigh	44	
35	Jan Raas	Netherlands	TI–Raleigh	DNF	
36	Ueli Sutter	Switzerland	TI–Raleigh	DNF	
37	Johan van der Velde	Netherlands	TI–Raleigh	14	
38	Leo van Vliet	Netherlands	TI–Raleigh	DNF	
39	Paul Wellens	Belgium	TI–Raleigh	8	
40	Wilfried Wesemael	Belgium	TI–Raleigh	DNF	
41	Lucien Van Impe	Belgium	Kas	11	
42	Bernardo Alfonsel	Belgium	Kas	78	
43	Joseph Borguet	Belgium	Kas	43	
44	Claude Criquielion	Belgium	Kas	9	
45	René Dillen	Belgium	Kas	61	
46	Francisco Galdós	Spain	Kas	28	
47	Rafael Ladrón de Guevara	Spain	Kas	DNF	
48	Willy Teirlinck	Belgium	Kas	56	
49	Pedro Vilardebo	Spain	Kas	DNF	
50	Frans Van Looy	Belgium	Kas	DNF	
51	Mariano Martínez	France	La Redoute–Motobécane	16	
52	Pierre Bazzo	France	La Redoute–Motobécane	33	
53	Christian Jourdan	France	La Redoute–Motobécane	68	
54	Gérard Macé	France	La Redoute–Motobécane	DNF	
55	Jean-Marie Michel	France	La Redoute–Motobécane	72	
56	Alain Patritti	France	La Redoute–Motobécane	DNF	
57	Jean-François Pescheux	France	La Redoute–Motobécane	73	
58	Christian Poirier	France	La Redoute–Motobécane	DNF	
59	Didier Vanoverschelde	France	La Redoute–Motobécane	41	
60	Bernard Vallet	France	La Redoute–Motobécane	20	
61	Hennie Kuiper	Netherlands	Peugeot–Esso	4	
62	Jacques Bossis	France	Peugeot–Esso	60	
63	Bernard Bourreau	France	Peugeot–Esso	79	
64	José De Cauwer	Belgium	Peugeot–Esso	85	
65	Gilbert Duclos-Lassalle	France	Peugeot–Esso	46	
66	Jacques Esclassan	France	Peugeot–Esso	DNF	
67	Yves Hézard	France	Peugeot–Esso	17	
68	Michel Laurent	France	Peugeot–Esso	37	
69	Roger Legeay	France	Peugeot–Esso	63	
70	Patrick Perret	France	Peugeot–Esso	DNF	
71	Manuel Esparza	Spain	Teka	DNF	
72	Faustino Fernández Ovies	Spain	Teka	DNF	
73	Eulalio García Pereda	Spain	Teka	86	
74	Miguel Gutiérrez	Spain	Teka	DNF	
75	Jürgen Kraft	West Germany	Teka	DNF	
76	Vicente López Carril	Spain	Teka	DNF	
77	Andrés Oliva	Spain	Teka	83	
78	José Pesarrodona	Spain	Teka	DNF	
79	Dominique Sanders	France	Teka	84	
80	José Viejo	Spain	Teka	DNF	
81	Robert Alban	France	Fiat–La France	19	
82	Michel Balbuena	France	Fiat–La France	65	
83	Serge Beucherie	France	Fiat–La France	87	
84	Didier Bourrier	France	Fiat–La France	DNF	
85	Alain De Carvalho	France	Fiat–La France	55	
86	Ferdinand Julien	France	Fiat–La France	52	
87	Gilbert Lelay	France	Fiat–La France	80	
88	Alain Meslet	France	Fiat–La France	34	
89	Philippe Tesnière	France	Fiat–La France	DNF	
90	Paul Sherwen	Great Britain	Fiat–La France	81	
91	Dietrich Thurau	West Germany	IJsboerke–Warncke	10	
92	Rudy Colman	Belgium	IJsboerke–Warncke	DNF	
93	Ludo Delcroix	Belgium	IJsboerke–Warncke	39	
94	Fedor den Hertog	Netherlands	IJsboerke–Warncke	48	
95	André Dierickx	Belgium	IJsboerke–Warncke	DNF	
96	Jos Jacobs	Belgium	IJsboerke–Warncke	45	
97	Ludo Peeters	Belgium	IJsboerke–Warncke	36	
98	Rudy Pevenage	Belgium	IJsboerke–Warncke	23	
99	Jos Van de Poel	Belgium	IJsboerke–Warncke	DNF	
100	Gery Verlinden	Belgium	IJsboerke–Warncke	DNF	
101	Michel Pollentier	Belgium	Splendor	DNF	
102	Herman Beysens	Belgium	Splendor	DNF	
103	Alain Desaever	Belgium	Splendor	DNF	
104	Christian Dumont	Belgium	Splendor	DNF	
105	Paul Jesson	New Zealand	Splendor	DNF	
106	Sean Kelly	Ireland	Splendor	38	
107	Ludo Loos	Belgium	Splendor	DNF	
108	Liévin Malfait	Belgium	Splendor	DNF	
109	Wim Myngheer	Belgium	Splendor	76	
110	Roger Verschaeve	Belgium	Splendor	DNF	
111	Johan De Muynck	Belgium	Bianchi–Faema	DNF	
112	Giovanni Cavalcanti	Italy	Bianchi–Faema	DNF	
113	Aldo Donadello	Italy	Bianchi–Faema	DNF	
114	Knut Knudsen	Norway	Bianchi–Faema	27	
115	Valerio Lualdi	Italy	Bianchi–Faema	DNF	
116	Serge Parsani	Italy	Bianchi–Faema	66	
117	Alessandro Pozzi	Italy	Bianchi–Faema	32	
118	Glauco Santoni	Italy	Bianchi–Faema	54	
119	Alex Van Linden	Belgium	Bianchi–Faema	88	
120	Rik Van Linden	Belgium	Bianchi–Faema	DNF	
121	Eddy Schepers	Belgium	Daf Trucks	15	
122	Maurizio Bellet	Italy	Daf Trucks	82	
123	Emiel De Haes	Belgium	Daf Trucks	DNF	
124	Jo Maas	Netherlands	Daf Trucks	7	
125	Robert Mintkiewicz	France	Daf Trucks	DNF	
126	Patrick Pevenage	Belgium	Daf Trucks	DNF	
127	Gerhard Schönbacher	Austria	Daf Trucks	89	
128	William Tackaert	Belgium	Daf Trucks	DNF	
129	Guido Van Calster	Belgium	Daf Trucks	58	
130	Jacques Verbrugge	Netherlands	Daf Trucks	DNF	
131	Giovanni Battaglin	Italy	Inoxpran	6	
132	Nazzareno Berto	Italy	Inoxpran	DNF	
133	Patrick Busolini	France	Inoxpran	DNF	
134	Gianfranco Foresti	Italy	Inoxpran	DNF	
135	Bruno Leali	Italy	Inoxpran	77	
136	Riccardo Magrini	Italy	Inoxpran	DNF	
137	Giovanni Mantovani	Italy	Inoxpran	DNF	
138	Luigino Moro	Italy	Inoxpran	DNF	
139	Pasquale Pugliese	Italy	Inoxpran	DNF	
140	Dorino Vanzo	Italy	Inoxpran	64	
141	Gianbattista Baronchelli	Italy	Magniflex–Famcucine	DNF	
142	Gaetano Baronchelli	Italy	Magniflex–Famcucine	DNF	
143	Per Bausager	Denmark	Magniflex–Famcucine	DNF	
144	Roberto Ceruti	Italy	Magniflex–Famcucine	DNF	
145	Bernt Johansson	Sweden	Magniflex–Famcucine	DNF	
146	Jørgen Marcussen	Denmark	Magniflex–Famcucine	DNF	
147	Ignazio Paleari	Italy	Magniflex–Famcucine	DNF	
148	Walter Polini	Italy	Magniflex–Famcucine	DNF	
149	Amilcare Sgalbazzi	Italy	Magniflex–Famcucine	DNF	
150	Alfio Vandi	Italy	Magniflex–Famcucine	DNF	
