= List of teams and cyclists in the 1980 Vuelta a España =

For the 1980 Vuelta a España, the field consisted of 110 riders; 63 finished the race.

== By rider ==
Legend
No.	Starting number worn by the rider during the Vuelta
Pos.	Position in the general classification
DNF	Denotes a rider who did not finish

No.	Name	Nationality	Team	Pos.	Ref
1	Miguel María Lasa	Spain	Zor–Vereco	9	
2	Faustino Rupérez	Spain	Zor–Vereco	1	
3	Ángel Arroyo	Spain	Zor–Vereco	17	
4	José Luis Cerrón	Spain	Zor–Vereco	63	
5	Juan Fernández	Spain	Zor–Vereco	16	
6	Jesús Suárez Cueva	Spain	Zor–Vereco	32	
7	Rafael Ladrón de Guevara	Spain	Zor–Vereco	37	
8	Eduardo Chozas	Spain	Zor–Vereco	36	
9	Manuel Martín Conde	Spain	Zor–Vereco	DNF	
10	Pedro Muñoz	Spain	Zor–Vereco	27	
11	Francisco Galdós	Spain	Kelme–Gios	8	
12	Vicente Belda	Spain	Kelme–Gios	10	
13	Pedro Torres	Spain	Kelme–Gios	2	
14	Juan Pujol	Spain	Kelme–Gios	24	
15	Felipe Yáñez	Spain	Kelme–Gios	30	
16	Andrés Oliva	Spain	Kelme–Gios	DNF	
17	Jorge Fortia	Spain	Kelme–Gios	34	
18	Francisco Ramon Albelda	Spain	Kelme–Gios	44	
19	Luis Casas	Spain	Kelme–Gios	DNF	
20	Domingo Muñoz	Spain	Kelme–Gios	DNF	
21	Klaus-Peter Thaler	West Germany	Teka	DNF	
22	Bernard Thévenet	France	Teka	14	
23	Enrique Martínez Heredia	Spain	Teka	31	
24	Jose Luis Viejo	Spain	Teka	DNF	
25	Eulalio García	Spain	Teka	39	
26	Bernardo Alfonsel	Spain	Teka	35	
27	Manuel Esparza	Spain	Teka	11	
28	Rolf Haller	West Germany	Teka	DNF	
29	José Nazabal	Spain	Teka	DNF	
30	Marino Lejarreta	Spain	Teka	5	
31	Juan José Quintanilla	Spain	Flavia-Gios	43	
32	Juan Luis Juárez	Spain	Flavia-Gios	53	
33	Manuel Murga	Spain	Flavia-Gios	DNF	
34	Jesús Ángel Ruiz Teran	Spain	Flavia-Gios	56	
35	Jorge Ruiz Cabestany	Spain	Flavia-Gios	40	
36	Pedro Vilardebó	Spain	Flavia-Gios	18	
37	Javier Elorriaga	Spain	Flavia-Gios	42	
38	Willy Albert	Belgium	Flavia-Gios	DNF	
39	Francisco Martín Peregrín	Spain	Flavia-Gios	DNF	
40	Jesús Hernández Úbeda	Spain	Flavia-Gios	47	
41	Miguel Acha	Spain	Reynolds	DNF	
42	Juan María Azcarate	Spain	Reynolds	DNF	
43	Anastasio Greciano	Spain	Reynolds	28	
44	Vicente Iza	Spain	Reynolds	57	
45	José Luis Laguía	Spain	Reynolds	21	
46	Ángel López del Álamo	Spain	Reynolds	DNF	
47	Francisco Javier López Izkue	Spain	Reynolds	55	
48	Juan Martín Ocaña	Spain	Reynolds	DNF	
49	Dominique Arnaud	France	Reynolds	54	
50	Héctor Rondán	Uruguay	Reynolds	DNF	
51	Roque Moya	Spain	Henninger	DNF	
52	José Enrique Cima	Spain	Henninger	22	
53	José Manuel García Rodríguez	Spain	Henninger	DNF	
54	Luis Alberto Ordiales	Spain	Henninger	51	
55	Sebastián Pozo	Spain	Henninger	DNF	
56	Faustino Fernández Ovies	Spain	Henninger	12	
57	Raymond Hernando	France	Henninger	41	
58	José María Yurrebaso	Spain	Henninger	DNF	
59	Juan-Carlos Alonso	Spain	Henninger	DNF	
60	Salvador Jarque	Spain	Henninger	DNF	
61	Michel Pollentier	Belgium	Splendor	26	
62	Johan De Muynck	Belgium	Splendor	7	
63	Etienne De Wilde	Belgium	Splendor	45	
64	Guido Van Calster	Belgium	Splendor	6	
65	Claude Criquielion	Belgium	Splendor	3	
66	Joseph Borguet	Belgium	Splendor	13	
67	Ronan Onghena	Belgium	Splendor	DNF	
68	Herman Beysens	Belgium	Splendor	DNF	
69	Sean Kelly	Ireland	Splendor	4	
70	Paul Jesson	New Zealand	Splendor	29	
71	Wim de Ruiter	Netherlands	HB Alarmsystemen	DNF	
72	Ad Van Peer	Netherlands	HB Alarmsystemen	46	
73	Co Moritz	Netherlands	HB Alarmsystemen	52	
74	Heddie Nieuwdorp	Netherlands	HB Alarmsystemen	DNF	
75	Peter Zijerveld	Netherlands	HB Alarmsystemen	25	
76	Rolf Groen	Netherlands	HB Alarmsystemen	DNF	
77	Jan Aling	Netherlands	HB Alarmsystemen	DNF	
78	Martin Havik	Netherlands	HB Alarmsystemen	DNF	
79	Jos Lammertink	Netherlands	HB Alarmsystemen	60	
80	Johan van der Meer	Netherlands	HB Alarmsystemen	DNF	
81	Claudio Bortolotto	Italy	San Giacomo	DNF	
82	Giuseppe Martinelli	Italy	San Giacomo	DNF	
83	Roberto Visentini	Italy	San Giacomo	15	
84	Tranquillo Andreetta	Italy	San Giacomo	DNF	
85	Orlando Maini	Italy	San Giacomo	DNF	
86	Tullio Bertacco	Italy	San Giacomo	DNF	
87	Maurizio Bertini	Italy	San Giacomo	38	
88	Leone Pizzini	Italy	San Giacomo	DNF	
89	Alessio Antonini	Italy	San Giacomo	DNF	
90	Alain De Roo	Belgium	San Giacomo	DNF	
91	Jesús Manzaneque	Spain	Manzaneque	49	
92	Ricardo Zúñiga	Spain	Manzaneque	23	
93	Jesús López Carril	Spain	Manzaneque	DNF	
94	Francisco Codony	Spain	Manzaneque	19	
95	Carlos Ocaña	Spain	Manzaneque	33	
96	Isidro Juárez	Spain	Manzaneque	48	
97	Jaime Martín Tarancón	Spain	Manzaneque	DNF	
98	Antonio Cabello	Spain	Manzaneque	61	
99	Francisco Sala	Spain	Manzaneque	58	
100	Juan Garcia Diaz	Spain	Manzaneque	DNF	
101	Antonio Sobrino	Spain	Colchón CR	59	
102	Juan Argudo	Spain	Colchón CR	DNF	
103	Salvador Galvez	Spain	Colchón CR	DNF	
104	Antonio González	Spain	Colchón CR	20	
105	Pedro Pardo	Spain	Colchón CR	DNF	
106	Lorenzo Vidal	Spain	Colchón CR	DNF	
107	Ignacio Fandos	Spain	Colchón CR	62	
108	Jesús López Soriano	Spain	Colchón CR	50	
109	Jose Antonio Bernal	Spain	Colchón CR	DNF	
110	José Recio	Spain	Colchón CR	DNF	
