= List of teams and cyclists in the 1977 Giro d'Italia =

The 1977 Giro d'Italia was the 60th edition of the Giro d'Italia, one of cycling's Grand Tours. The field consisted of 140 riders, and 121 riders finished the race.

== By rider ==
Legend
No.	Starting number worn by the rider during the Giro
Pos.	Position in the general classification
DNF	Denotes a rider who did not finish

No.	Name	Nationality	Team	Ref
1	Felice Gimondi	Italy	Bianchi–Campagnolo	
2	Rik Van Linden	Belgium	Bianchi–Campagnolo	
3	Luigi Castelleti	Italy	Bianchi–Campagnolo	
4	Giovanni Cavalcanti	Italy	Bianchi–Campagnolo	
5	Willy In 't Ven	Belgium	Bianchi–Campagnolo	
6	Antoine Houbrechts	Belgium	Bianchi–Campagnolo	
7	Serge Parsani	Italy	Bianchi–Campagnolo	
8	Giacinto Santambrogio	Italy	Bianchi–Campagnolo	
9	Glauco Santoni	Italy	Bianchi–Campagnolo	
10	Alex Van Linden	Belgium	Bianchi–Campagnolo	
11	Roger De Vlaeminck	Belgium	Brooklyn	
12	Johan De Muynck	Belgium	Brooklyn	
13	Ronald De Witte	Belgium	Brooklyn	
14	Giancarlo Bellini	Italy	Brooklyn	
15	Ottavio Crepaldi	Italy	Brooklyn	
16	Marcello Osler	Italy	Brooklyn	
17	Aldo Parecchini	Italy	Brooklyn	
18	Celestino Vercelli	Italy	Brooklyn	
19	Willy De Geest	Belgium	Brooklyn	
20	Herman Van der Slagmolen	Belgium	Brooklyn	
21	Carmello Barone	Italy	Fiorella–Mocassini	
22	Antonio Bonini	Italy	Fiorella–Mocassini	
23	Andrea Checchi	Italy	Fiorella–Mocassini	
24	Bernt Johansson	Sweden	Fiorella–Mocassini	
25	Riccardo Magrini	Italy	Fiorella–Mocassini	
26	Mario Mezzano	Italy	Fiorella–Mocassini	
27	Ignazio Paleari	Italy	Fiorella–Mocassini	
28	Clyde Sefton	Australia	Fiorella–Mocassini	
29	Mauro Simonetti	Italy	Fiorella–Mocassini	
30	Gianluigi Zuanel	Italy	Fiorella–Mocassini	
31	Pietro Algeri	Italy	G.B.C.–Itla	
32	Vittorio Algeri	Italy	G.B.C.–Itla	
33	Roberto Ceruti	Italy	G.B.C.–Itla	
34	Gabriele Landoni	Italy	G.B.C.–Itla	
35	Luciano Loro	Italy	G.B.C.–Itla	
36	Walter Polini	Italy	G.B.C.–Itla	
37	Angelo Tosoni	Italy	G.B.C.–Itla	
38	Dorino Vanzo	Italy	G.B.C.–Itla	
39	Bruno Vicino	Italy	G.B.C.–Itla	
40	Bruno Zanoni	Italy	G.B.C.–Itla	
41	Alessio Antonini	Italy	Jollj Ceramica	
42	Giovanni Battaglin	Italy	Jollj Ceramica	
43	Fausto Bertoglio	Italy	Jollj Ceramica	
44	Pierino Gavazzi	Italy	Jollj Ceramica	
45	Knut Knudsen	Norway	Jollj Ceramica	
46	Simone Fraccaro	Italy	Jollj Ceramica	
47	Amilcare Sgalbazzi	Italy	Jollj Ceramica	
48	Giuseppe Martinelli	Italy	Jollj Ceramica	
49	Giuseppe Giuliani	Italy	Jollj Ceramica	
50	Alfredo Chinetti	Italy	Jollj Ceramica	
51	José Viejo	Spain	Kas–Campagnolo	
52	Domingo Perurena	Spain	Kas–Campagnolo	
53	Vicente López Carril	Spain	Kas–Campagnolo	
54	Sebastián Pozo	Spain	Kas–Campagnolo	
55	José Enrique Cima	Spain	Kas–Campagnolo	
56	Julián Andiano	Spain	Kas–Campagnolo	
57	José Antonio González	Spain	Kas–Campagnolo	
58	Faustino Fernández Ovies	Spain	Kas–Campagnolo	
59	Juan Pujol	Spain	Kas–Campagnolo	
60	Enrique Martínez Heredia	Spain	Kas–Campagnolo	
61	Freddy Maertens	Belgium	Flandria–Velda–Latina Assicurazioni	
62	Michel Pollentier	Belgium	Flandria–Velda–Latina Assicurazioni	
63	Marc Demeyer	Belgium	Flandria–Velda–Latina Assicurazioni	
64	Liévin Malfait	Belgium	Flandria–Velda–Latina Assicurazioni	
65	Pol Verschuere	Belgium	Flandria–Velda–Latina Assicurazioni	
66	Roger Verschaeve	Belgium	Flandria–Velda–Latina Assicurazioni	
67	Albert Van Vlierberghe	Belgium	Flandria–Velda–Latina Assicurazioni	
68	Mariano Martinez	France	Flandria–Velda–Latina Assicurazioni	
69	Eric Loder	Switzerland	Flandria–Velda–Latina Assicurazioni	
70	Herman Beysens	Belgium	Flandria–Velda–Latina Assicurazioni	
71	Alfio Vandi	Italy	Magniflex–Torpado	
72	Armando Lora	Italy	Magniflex–Torpado	
73	Sigfrido Fontanelli	Italy	Magniflex–Torpado	
74	Giuseppe Perletto	Italy	Magniflex–Torpado	
75	Daniele Tinchella	Italy	Magniflex–Torpado	
76	Wilmo Francioni	Italy	Magniflex–Torpado	
77	Mauro Vannucchi	Italy	Magniflex–Torpado	
78	Ruggero Gialdini	Italy	Magniflex–Torpado	
79	Jean-Luc Fabbri	Italy	Magniflex–Torpado	
80	Giancarlo Tartoni	Italy	Magniflex–Torpado	
81	Francesco Moser	Italy	Sanson	
82	Mario Beccia	Italy	Sanson	
83	Phil Edwards	Great Britain	Sanson	
84	Claudio Bortolotto	Italy	Sanson	
85	Aldo Donadello	Italy	Sanson	
86	Fabrizio Fabbri	Italy	Sanson	
87	Josef Fuchs	Switzerland	Sanson	
88	Valerio Lualdi	Italy	Sanson	
89	Renato Marchetti	Italy	Sanson	
90	Roberto Poggiali	Italy	Sanson	
91	Gianbattista Baronchelli	Italy	Scic	
92	Gaetano Baronchelli	Italy	Scic	
93	Osvaldo Bettoni	Italy	Scic	
94	Arnaldo Caverzasi	Italy	Scic	
95	Luciano Conati	Italy	Scic	
96	Gianfranco Foresti	Italy	Scic	
97	Ercole Gualazzini	Italy	Scic	
98	Wladimiro Panizza	Italy	Scic	n
99	Enrico Paolini	Italy	Scic	
100	Walter Riccomi	Italy	Scic	
101	Marino Basso	Italy	Selle Royal–Contour	
102	Alberto Caiumi	Italy	Selle Royal–Contour	
103	René Leuenberger	Switzerland	Selle Royal–Contour	
104	Annibale De Faveri	Italy	Selle Royal–Contour	
105	Adriano Pella	Italy	Selle Royal–Contour	
106	Leone Pizzini	Italy	Selle Royal–Contour	
107	Sandro Quintarelli	Italy	Selle Royal–Contour	
108	Ger Bausager	Denmark	Selle Royal–Contour	
109	Hans-Peter Jakst	West Germany	Selle Royal–Contour	
110	Jürgen Kraft	West Germany	Selle Royal–Contour	
111	Miguel María Lasa	Spain	Teka	
112	Paulino Martínez	Spain	Teka	
113	Gonzalo Aja	Spain	Teka	
114	Javier Elorriaga	Spain	Teka	
115	José Grande	Spain	Teka	
116	Luis Balagué	Spain	Teka	
117	Jesús Suárez Cueva	Spain	Teka	
118	Pedro Vilardebó	Spain	Teka	
119	Manuel Esparza	Spain	Teka	
120	Francisco Moreno	Spain	Teka	
121	Franco Bitossi	Italy	Vibor	
122	Maurizio Bertini	Italy	Vibor	
123	Flavio Miozzo	Italy	Vibor	
124	Luciano Borgognoni	Italy	Vibor	
125	Renato Laghi	Italy	Vibor	
126	Jørgen Marcussen	Denmark	Vibor	
127	Gabriele Mugnaini	Italy	Vibor	
128	Remo Rocchia	Italy	Vibor	
129	Giuseppe Rodella	Italy	Vibor	
130	Antonio Salutini	Italy	Vibor	
131	Marcello Bergamo	Italy	Zonca–Santini	
132	Tino Conti	Italy	Zonca–Santini	
133	Franco Conti	Italy	Zonca–Santini	
134	Enrico Guadrini	Italy	Zonca–Santini	
135	Leonardo Mazzantini	Italy	Zonca–Santini	
136	Giuseppe Passuello	Italy	Zonca–Santini	
137	Pasquale Pugliese	Italy	Zonca–Santini	
138	Annunzio Colombo	Italy	Zonca–Santini	
139	Piero Spinelli	Italy	Zonca–Santini	
140	Ueli Sutter	Switzerland	Zonca–Santini	
