= 1980 Vuelta a España, Stage 11 to Stage 19 =

Cycling race stages

The 1980 Vuelta a España was the 35th edition of the Vuelta a España, one of cycling's Grand Tours. The Vuelta began in La Manga, with a prologue individual time trial on 22 April, and Stage 11 occurred on 3 May with a stage from Santander. The race finished in Madrid on 11 May.

== Stage 11 ==
3 May 1980 — Santander to Gijón, 219 km (136 mi)

Stage 11 result

Rank	Rider	Team	Time
1	Jesús López Carril (ESP)	Manzaneque	5h 59' 52"
2	José Luis Laguía (ESP)	Reynolds	+ 1' 01"
3	Claudio Bortolotto (ITA)	San Giacomo	s.t.
4	Guido Van Calster (BEL)	Splendor	s.t.
5	José Enrique Cima (ESP)	Henninger	s.t.
6	Roberto Visentini (ITA)	San Giacomo	s.t.
7	Klaus-Peter Thaler (FRG)	Teka	s.t.
8	Maurizio Bertini (ITA)	San Giacomo	s.t.
9	Pedro Torres (ESP)	Kelme–Gios	s.t.
10	Marino Lejarreta (ESP)	Teka	s.t.

General classification after Stage 11

Rank	Rider	Team	Time
1	Faustino Rupérez (ESP)	Zor–Vereco	56h 20' 31"
2	Pedro Torres (ESP)	Kelme–Gios	+ 2' 55"
3	Claude Criquielion (BEL)	Splendor	+ 3' 22"
4	Marino Lejarreta (ESP)	Teka	+ 4' 07"
5	Roberto Visentini (ITA)	San Giacomo	+ 4' 11"
6	Sean Kelly (IRL)	Splendor	+ 4' 13"
7	Joseph Borguet (BEL)	Splendor	+ 4' 18"
8	Francisco Galdós (ESP)	Kelme–Gios	+ 4' 27"
9	Guido Van Calster (BEL)	Splendor	+ 4' 28"
10	Tullio Bertacco (ITA)	San Giacomo	+ 4' 34"

== Stage 12 ==
4 May 1980 — Santiago de Compostela to Pontevedra, 133 km (83 mi)

Stage 12 result

Rank	Rider	Team	Time
1	Etienne De Wilde (BEL)	Splendor	3h 21' 51"
2	Orlando Maini (ITA)	San Giacomo	s.t.
3	Jesús Hernández Úbeda (ESP)	Flavia-Gios	s.t.
4	Peter Zijerveld (NED)	HB Alarmsystemen	s.t.
5	Francisco Ramon Albelda (ESP)	Kelme–Gios	s.t.
6	Ángel Arroyo (ESP)	Kelme–Gios	s.t.
7	Raymond Hernando (FRA)	Henninger	s.t.
8	Klaus-Peter Thaler (FRG)	Teka	s.t.
9	Alain De Roo (BEL)	San Giacomo	s.t.
10	Martin Havik (NED)	HB Alarmsystemen	s.t.

General classification after Stage 12

Rank	Rider	Team	Time
1	Faustino Rupérez (ESP)	Zor–Vereco	59h 48' 35"
2	Pedro Torres (ESP)	Kelme–Gios	+ 2' 55"
3	Claude Criquielion (BEL)	Splendor	+ 3' 22"
4	Marino Lejarreta (ESP)	Teka	+ 4' 07"
5	Roberto Visentini (ITA)	San Giacomo	+ 4' 11"
6	Sean Kelly (IRL)	Splendor	+ 4' 13"
7	Joseph Borguet (BEL)	Splendor	+ 4' 18"
8	Francisco Galdós (ESP)	Kelme–Gios	+ 4' 37"
9	Guido Van Calster (BEL)	Splendor	+ 4' 38"
10	Tullio Bertacco (ITA)	San Giacomo	+ 4' 44"

== Stage 13 ==
5 May 1980 — Pontevedra to Vigo, 195 km (121 mi)

Stage 13 result

Rank	Rider	Team	Time
1	Rolf Haller (FRG)	Teka	5h 13' 17"
2	Jesús Hernández Úbeda (ESP)	Flavia-Gios	s.t.
3	Enrique Martínez Heredia (ESP)	Teka	+ 1' 24"
4	Michel Pollentier (BEL)	Splendor	s.t.
5	Javier Elorriaga (ESP)	Flavia-Gios	s.t.
6	Alessio Antonini (ITA)	San Giacomo	s.t.
7	Heddie Nieuwdorp (NED)	HB Alarmsystemen	s.t.
8	Manuel Martín Conde (ESP)	Zor–Vereco	s.t.
9	José Manuel García Rodríguez (ESP)	Henninger	s.t.
10	Felipe Yáñez (ESP)	Kelme–Gios	s.t.

General classification after Stage 13

Rank	Rider	Team	Time
1	Faustino Rupérez (ESP)	Zor–Vereco	
2	Pedro Torres (ESP)	Kelme–Gios	+ 2' 55"
3	Claude Criquielion (BEL)	Splendor	+ 3' 22"

== Stage 14 ==
6 May 1980 — Vigo to Ourense, 156 km (97 mi)

Stage 14 result

Rank	Rider	Team	Time
1	Sean Kelly (IRL)	Splendor	4h 11' 19"
2	Giuseppe Martinelli (ITA)	San Giacomo	s.t.
3	Guido Van Calster (BEL)	Splendor	s.t.
4	Enrique Martínez Heredia (ESP)	Teka	s.t.
5	Johan van der Meer (NED)	HB Alarmsystemen	s.t.
6	Javier Elorriaga (ESP)	Flavia-Gios	s.t.
7	Jos Lammertink (NED)	HB Alarmsystemen	s.t.
8	Tullio Bertacco (ITA)	San Giacomo	s.t.
9	Wim de Ruiter (NED)	HB Alarmsystemen	s.t.
10	Heddie Nieuwdorp (NED)	HB Alarmsystemen	s.t.

General classification after Stage 14

Rank	Rider	Team	Time
1	Faustino Rupérez (ESP)	Zor–Vereco	69h 17' 52"
2	Pedro Torres (ESP)	Kelme–Gios	+ 2' 55"
3	Claude Criquielion (BEL)	Splendor	+ 3' 22"
4	Marino Lejarreta (ESP)	Teka	+ 4' 07"
5	Roberto Visentini (ITA)	San Giacomo	+ 4' 11"
6	Sean Kelly (IRL)	Splendor	+ 4' 13"
7	Joseph Borguet (BEL)	Splendor	+ 4' 18"
8	Francisco Galdós (ESP)	Kelme–Gios	+ 4' 37"
9	Guido Van Calster (BEL)	Splendor	+ 4' 38"
10	Tullio Bertacco (ITA)	San Giacomo	+ 4' 44"

== Stage 15 ==
7 May 1980 — Ourense to Ponferrada, 164 km (102 mi)

Stage 15 result

Rank	Rider	Team	Time
1	Javier Elorriaga (ESP)	Flavia-Gios	4h 10' 20"
2	Peter Zijerveld (NED)	HB Alarmsystemen	+ 3' 56"
3	Maurizio Bertini (ITA)	San Giacomo	s.t.
4	Jesús Hernández Úbeda (ESP)	Flavia-Gios	+ 5' 20"
5	Sean Kelly (IRL)	Splendor	+ 7' 10"
6	Guido Van Calster (BEL)	Splendor	s.t.
7	Klaus-Peter Thaler (FRG)	Teka	s.t.
8	Etienne De Wilde (BEL)	Splendor	s.t.
9	José Luis Laguía (ESP)	Reynolds	s.t.
10	Juan José Quintanilla (ESP)	Flavia-Gios	s.t.

General classification after Stage 15

Rank	Rider	Team	Time
1	Faustino Rupérez (ESP)	Zor–Vereco	73h 35' 22"
2	Pedro Torres (ESP)	Kelme–Gios	+ 2' 55"
3	Claude Criquielion (BEL)	Splendor	+ 3' 22"
4	Marino Lejarreta (ESP)	Teka	+ 4' 03"
5	Roberto Visentini (ITA)	San Giacomo	+ 4' 11"
6	Sean Kelly (IRL)	Splendor	+ 4' 13"
7	Joseph Borguet (BEL)	Splendor	+ 4' 18"
8	Francisco Galdós (ESP)	Kelme–Gios	+ 4' 37"
9	Guido Van Calster (BEL)	Splendor	+ 4' 38"
10	Johan De Muynck (BEL)	Splendor	+ 4' 44"

== Stage 16a ==
8 May 1980 — Ponferrada to León, 131 km (81 mi)

Stage 16a result

Rank	Rider	Team	Time
1	Dominique Arnaud (FRA)	Reynolds	3h 01' 01"
2	Jorge Ruiz Cabestany (ESP)	Flavia-Gios	s.t.
3	Antonio Sobrino (ESP)	Colchón CR	+ 3' 51"
4	Javier Elorriaga (ESP)	Flavia-Gios	s.t.
5	Ad Van Peer (NED)	HB Alarmsystemen	+ 3' 52"
6	Jesús López Carril (ESP)	Manzaneque	s.t.
7	Klaus-Peter Thaler (FRG)	Teka	s.t.
8	Sean Kelly (IRL)	Splendor	s.t.
9	Etienne De Wilde (BEL)	Splendor	s.t.
10	Peter Zijerveld (NED)	HB Alarmsystemen	s.t.

General classification after Stage 16a

Rank	Rider	Team	Time
1	Faustino Rupérez (ESP)	Zor–Vereco	
2	Pedro Torres (ESP)	Kelme–Gios	+ 2' 55"
3	Claude Criquielion (BEL)	Splendor	+ 3' 22"

== Stage 16b ==
8 May 1980 — León to León, 22.8 km (14.2 mi) (ITT)

Stage 16b result

Rank	Rider	Team	Time
1	Roberto Visentini (ITA)	San Giacomo	32' 11"
2	Michel Pollentier (BEL)	Splendor	+ 48"
3	Joseph Borguet (BEL)	Splendor	s.t.
4	Sean Kelly (IRL)	Splendor	+ 1' 02"
5	Pedro Torres (ESP)	Kelme–Gios	+ 1' 04"
6	Claude Criquielion (BEL)	Splendor	+ 1' 18"
7	Faustino Rupérez (ESP)	Zor–Vereco	+ 1' 41"
8	Faustino Fernández Ovies (ESP)	Henninger	+ 1' 46"
9	Guido Van Calster (BEL)	Splendor	+ 1' 50"
10	Francisco Galdós (ESP)	Kelme–Gios	+ 2' 03"

General classification after Stage 16b

Rank	Rider	Team	Time
1	Faustino Rupérez (ESP)	Zor–Vereco	77h 14' 35"
2	Pedro Torres (ESP)	Kelme–Gios	+ 2' 18"
3	Roberto Visentini (ITA)	San Giacomo	+ 2' 30"
4	Claude Criquielion (BEL)	Splendor	+ 2' 59"
5	Joseph Borguet (BEL)	Splendor	+ 3' 25"
6	Sean Kelly (IRL)	Splendor	+ 3' 34"
7	Marino Lejarreta (ESP)	Teka	+ 4' 35"
8	Guido Van Calster (BEL)	Splendor	+ 4' 47"
9	Johan De Muynck (BEL)	Splendor	+ 4' 57"
10	Francisco Galdós (ESP)	Kelme–Gios	+ 4' 59"

== Stage 17 ==
9 May 1980 — León to Valladolid, 138 km (86 mi)

Stage 17 result

Rank	Rider	Team	Time
1	Sean Kelly (IRL)	Splendor	3h 34' 21"
2	Etienne De Wilde (BEL)	Splendor	s.t.
3	Jos Lammertink (NED)	HB Alarmsystemen	s.t.
4	Klaus-Peter Thaler (FRG)	Teka	s.t.
5	Guido Van Calster (BEL)	Splendor	s.t.
6	Antonio Sobrino (ESP)	Colchón CR	s.t.
7	Javier Elorriaga (ESP)	Flavia-Gios	s.t.
8	José Luis Laguía (ESP)	Reynolds	s.t.
9	Luis Alberto Ordiales (ESP)	Henninger	s.t.
10	Jesús Hernández Úbeda (ESP)	Flavia-Gios	s.t.

General classification after Stage 17

Rank	Rider	Team	Time
1	Faustino Rupérez (ESP)	Zor–Vereco	80h 49' 06"
2	Pedro Torres (ESP)	Kelme–Gios	+ 2' 18"
3	Roberto Visentini (ITA)	San Giacomo	+ 2' 30"
4	Claude Criquielion (BEL)	Splendor	+ 2' 59"
5	Joseph Borguet (BEL)	Splendor	+ 3' 25"
6	Sean Kelly (IRL)	Splendor	+ 3' 34"
7	Marino Lejarreta (ESP)	Teka	+ 4' 35"
8	Guido Van Calster (BEL)	Splendor	+ 4' 47"
9	Johan De Muynck (BEL)	Splendor	+ 4' 57"
10	Francisco Galdós (ESP)	Kelme–Gios	+ 4' 59"

== Stage 18 ==
10 May 1980 — Valladolid to Los Ángeles de San Rafael, 197 km (122 mi)

Stage 18 result

Rank	Rider	Team	Time
1	Manuel Esparza (ESP)	Teka	5h 42' 23"
2	Pedro Vilardebó (ESP)	Flavia-Gios	+ 2' 01"
3	Pedro Torres (ESP)	Kelme–Gios	+ 2' 07"
4	Miguel María Lasa (ESP)	Zor–Vereco	s.t.
5	Sean Kelly (IRL)	Splendor	s.t.
6	Marino Lejarreta (ESP)	Teka	s.t.
7	Guido Van Calster (BEL)	Splendor	s.t.
8	Vicente Belda (ESP)	Kelme–Gios	+ 2' 09"
9	Faustino Rupérez (ESP)	Zor–Vereco	+ 2' 10"
10	Francisco Galdós (ESP)	Kelme–Gios	+ 2' 11"

General classification after Stage 18

Rank	Rider	Team	Time
1	Faustino Rupérez (ESP)	Zor–Vereco	86h 33' 39"
2	Pedro Torres (ESP)	Kelme–Gios	+ 2' 15"
3	Claude Criquielion (BEL)	Splendor	+ 3' 00"
4	Sean Kelly (IRL)	Splendor	+ 3' 31"
5	Marino Lejarreta (ESP)	Teka	+ 4' 32"
6	Guido Van Calster (BEL)	Splendor	+ 4' 44"
7	Johan De Muynck (BEL)	Splendor	+ 4' 58"
8	Francisco Galdós (ESP)	Kelme–Gios	+ 5' 00"
9	Miguel María Lasa (ESP)	Zor–Vereco	+ 5' 25"
10	Vicente Belda (ESP)	Kelme–Gios	+ 6' 41"

== Stage 19 ==
11 May 1980 — Madrid to Madrid, 84 km (52 mi)

Stage 19 result

Rank	Rider	Team	Time
1	Sean Kelly (IRL)	Splendor	1h 49' 42"
2	Javier Elorriaga (ESP)	Flavia-Gios	s.t.
3	Jos Lammertink (NED)	HB Alarmsystemen	s.t.
4	Jesús Suárez Cueva (ESP)	Zor–Vereco	s.t.
5	Antonio Sobrino (ESP)	Colchón CR	s.t.
6	José Luis Laguía (ESP)	Reynolds	s.t.
7	Miguel María Lasa (ESP)	Zor–Vereco	s.t.
8	Maurizio Bertini (ITA)	San Giacomo	s.t.
9	Luis Alberto Ordiales (ESP)	Henninger	s.t.
10	Marino Lejarreta (ESP)	Teka	s.t.

General classification after Stage 19

Rank	Rider	Team	Time
1	Faustino Rupérez (ESP)	Zor–Vereco	88h 23' 21"
2	Pedro Torres (ESP)	Kelme–Gios	+ 2' 15"
3	Claude Criquielion (BEL)	Splendor	+ 3' 00"
4	Sean Kelly (IRL)	Splendor	+ 3' 31"
5	Marino Lejarreta (ESP)	Teka	+ 4' 32"
6	Guido Van Calster (BEL)	Splendor	+ 4' 44"
7	Johan De Muynck (BEL)	Splendor	+ 4' 58"
8	Francisco Galdós (ESP)	Kelme–Gios	+ 5' 00"
9	Miguel María Lasa (ESP)	Zor–Vereco	+ 5' 25"
10	Vicente Belda (ESP)	Kelme–Gios	+ 6' 41"
