= 1980 Vuelta a España, Prologue to Stage 10 =

Cycling race stages

The 1980 Vuelta a España was the 35th edition of the Vuelta a España, one of cycling's Grand Tours. The Vuelta began in La Manga, with a prologue individual time trial on 22 April, and Stage 10 occurred on 2 May with a stage to Santander. The race finished in Madrid on 11 May.

== Prologue ==
22 April 1980 — La Manga to La Manga, 10 km (6.2 mi) (ITT)

Prologue result and general classification after Prologue

Rank	Rider	Team	Time
1	Roberto Visentini (ITA)	San Giacomo	13' 43"
2	Sean Kelly (IRL)	Splendor	+ 2"
3	Joseph Borguet (BEL)	Splendor	+ 7"
4	Paul Jesson (NZL)	Splendor	+ 8"
5	Pedro Torres (ESP)	Kelme–Gios	+ 17"
6	Pedro Vilardebó (ESP)	Flavia-Gios	+ 22"
7	Claude Criquielion (BEL)	Splendor	+ 23"
8	Heddie Nieuwdorp (NED)	HB Alarmsystemen	s.t.
9	Michel Pollentier (BEL)	Splendor	+ 24"
10	Juan Pujol (ESP)	Kelme–Gios	+ 26"

== Stage 1 ==
23 April 1980 — La Manga to Benidorm, 155 km (96 mi)

Stage 1 result

Rank	Rider	Team	Time
1	Sean Kelly (IRL)	Splendor	4h 08' 05"
2	Johan van der Meer (NED)	HB Alarmsystemen	s.t.
3	Giuseppe Martinelli (ITA)	San Giacomo	s.t.
4	Klaus-Peter Thaler (FRG)	Teka	s.t.
5	Francisco Martín Peregrín (ESP)	Flavia-Gios	s.t.
6	Willy Albert (BEL)	Flavia-Gios	s.t.
7	Alessio Antonini (ITA)	San Giacomo	s.t.
8	Jose Luis Viejo (ESP)	Teka	s.t.
9	Domingo Muñoz (ESP)	Kelme–Gios	s.t.
10	Herman Beysens (BEL)	Splendor	s.t.

General classification after Stage 1

Rank	Rider	Team	Time
1	Roberto Visentini (ITA)	San Giacomo	4h 21' 48"
2	Sean Kelly (IRL)	Splendor	+ 2"
3	Joseph Borguet (BEL)	Splendor	+ 7"
4	Paul Jesson (NZL)	Splendor	+ 8"
5	Pedro Torres (ESP)	Kelme–Gios	+ 17"
6	Pedro Vilardebó (ESP)	Flavia-Gios	+ 22"
7	Claude Criquielion (BEL)	Splendor	+ 23"
8	Heddie Nieuwdorp (NED)	HB Alarmsystemen	s.t.
9	Michel Pollentier (BEL)	Splendor	+ 24"
10	Juan Pujol (ESP)	Kelme–Gios	+ 26"

== Stage 2 ==
24 April 1980 — Benidorm to Cullera, 170 km (110 mi)

Stage 2 result

Rank	Rider	Team	Time
1	Sean Kelly (IRL)	Splendor	5h 10' 42"
2	Giuseppe Martinelli (ITA)	San Giacomo	s.t.
3	Klaus-Peter Thaler (FRG)	Teka	s.t.
4	Rolf Groen (NED)	HB Alarmsystemen	s.t.
5	Jesús Suárez Cueva (ESP)	Zor–Vereco	s.t.
6	Juan Fernández (ESP)	Zor–Vereco	s.t.
7	Paul Jesson (NZL)	Splendor	s.t.
8	Jan Aling (NED)	HB Alarmsystemen	s.t.
9	Johan van der Meer (NED)	HB Alarmsystemen	s.t.
10	Javier Elorriaga (ESP)	Flavia-Gios	s.t.

General classification after Stage 2

Rank	Rider	Team	Time
1	Roberto Visentini (ITA)	San Giacomo	9h 32' 30"
2	Sean Kelly (IRL)	Splendor	+ 2"
3	Joseph Borguet (BEL)	Splendor	+ 7"
4	Paul Jesson (NZL)	Splendor	+ 8"
5	Pedro Torres (ESP)	Kelme–Gios	+ 17"
6	Pedro Vilardebó (ESP)	Flavia-Gios	+ 22"
7	Claude Criquielion (BEL)	Splendor	+ 23"
8	Heddie Nieuwdorp (NED)	HB Alarmsystemen	s.t.
9	Michel Pollentier (BEL)	Splendor	+ 24"
10	Juan Pujol (ESP)	Kelme–Gios	+ 26"

== Stage 3 ==
25 April 1980 — Cullera to Vinaròs, 207 km (129 mi)

Stage 3 result

Rank	Rider	Team	Time
1	Giuseppe Martinelli (ITA)	San Giacomo	6h 05' 55"
2	Sean Kelly (IRL)	Splendor	s.t.
3	Klaus-Peter Thaler (FRG)	Teka	s.t.
4	Jesús Suárez Cueva (ESP)	Zor–Vereco	s.t.
5	Guido Van Calster (BEL)	Splendor	s.t.
6	Domingo Muñoz (ESP)	Kelme–Gios	s.t.
7	Rolf Groen (NED)	HB Alarmsystemen	s.t.
8	Manuel Murga (ESP)	Flavia-Gios	s.t.
9	Jan Aling (NED)	HB Alarmsystemen	s.t.
10	Johan van der Meer (NED)	HB Alarmsystemen	s.t.

General classification after Stage 3

Rank	Rider	Team	Time
1	Roberto Visentini (ITA)	San Giacomo	15h 39' 25"
2	Sean Kelly (IRL)	Splendor	+ 2"
3	Joseph Borguet (BEL)	Splendor	+ 7"
4	Paul Jesson (NZL)	Splendor	+ 8"
5	Pedro Torres (ESP)	Kelme–Gios	+ 17"
6	Pedro Vilardebó (ESP)	Flavia-Gios	+ 22"
7	Claude Criquielion (BEL)	Splendor	+ 23"
8	Heddie Nieuwdorp (NED)	HB Alarmsystemen	s.t.
9	Michel Pollentier (BEL)	Splendor	+ 24"
10	Juan Pujol (ESP)	Kelme–Gios	+ 26"

== Stage 4 ==
26 April 1980 — Vinaròs to Sant Quirze del Vallès, 214 km (133 mi)

Stage 4 result

Rank	Rider	Team	Time
1	Klaus-Peter Thaler (FRG)	Teka	5h 29' 48"
2	Jesús Suárez Cueva (ESP)	Fosforera–Vereco MG	s.t.
3	Giuseppe Martinelli (ITA)	San Giacomo	s.t.
4	José Luis Laguía (ESP)	Reynolds	s.t.
5	Guido Van Calster (BEL)	Splendor	s.t.
6	Sebastián Pozo (ESP)	Henninger	s.t.
7	Miguel María Lasa (ESP)	Zor–Vereco	s.t.
8	Pedro Vilardebó (ESP)	Flavia-Gios	s.t.
9	Enrique Martínez Heredia (ESP)	Teka	s.t.
10	Roberto Visentini (ITA)	San Giacomo	s.t.

General classification after Stage 4

Rank	Rider	Team	Time
1	Roberto Visentini (ITA)	San Giacomo	21h 09' 13"
2	Sean Kelly (IRL)	Splendor	+ 2"
3	Joseph Borguet (BEL)	Splendor	+ 7"
4	Paul Jesson (NZL)	Splendor	+ 8"
5	Pedro Torres (ESP)	Kelme–Gios	+ 17"
6	Pedro Vilardebó (ESP)	Flavia-Gios	+ 22"
7	Claude Criquielion (BEL)	Splendor	+ 23"
8	Heddie Nieuwdorp (NED)	HB Alarmsystemen	s.t.
9	Michel Pollentier (BEL)	Splendor	+ 24"
10	Juan Pujol (ESP)	Kelme–Gios	+ 26"

== Stage 5 ==
27 April 1980 — Sant Quirze del Vallès to La Seu d'Urgell, 200 km (120 mi)

Stage 5 result

Rank	Rider	Team	Time
1	Faustino Rupérez (ESP)	Fosforera–Vereco MG	6h 02' 23"
2	Sean Kelly (IRL)	Splendor	+ 3' 28"
3	Guido Van Calster (BEL)	Splendor	s.t.
4	Claudio Bortolotto (ITA)	San Giacomo	s.t.
5	Juan Fernández (ESP)	Zor–Vereco	s.t.
6	Roberto Visentini (ITA)	San Giacomo	s.t.
7	Klaus-Peter Thaler (FRG)	Teka	s.t.
8	Miguel María Lasa (ESP)	Zor–Vereco	s.t.
9	Vicente Belda (ESP)	Kelme–Gios	s.t.
10	Pedro Torres (ESP)	Kelme–Gios	s.t.

General classification after Stage 5

Rank	Rider	Team	Time
1	Faustino Rupérez (ESP)	Zor–Vereco	27h 12' 25"
2	Roberto Visentini (ITA)	San Giacomo	+ 2' 39"
3	Sean Kelly (IRL)	Splendor	+ 2' 41"
4	Joseph Borguet (BEL)	Splendor	+ 2' 46"
5	Pedro Torres (ESP)	Kelme–Gios	+ 2' 56"
6	Pedro Vilardebó (ESP)	Flavia-Gios	+ 3' 01"
7	Claude Criquielion (BEL)	Splendor	+ 3' 02"
8	Juan Pujol (ESP)	Kelme–Gios	+ 3' 05"
9	Francisco Galdós (ESP)	Kelme–Gios	s.t.
10	Guido Van Calster (BEL)	Splendor	+ 3' 06"

== Stage 6 ==
28 April 1980 — La Seu d'Urgell to Viella, 131 km (81 mi)

Stage 6 result

Rank	Rider	Team	Time
1	Enrique Martínez Heredia (ESP)	Teka	3h 59' 34"
2	Sean Kelly (IRL)	Splendor	s.t.
3	Guido Van Calster (BEL)	Splendor	s.t.
4	Klaus-Peter Thaler (FRG)	Teka	s.t.
5	Claudio Bortolotto (ITA)	San Giacomo	s.t.
6	Miguel María Lasa (ESP)	Zor–Vereco	s.t.
7	Roberto Visentini (ITA)	San Giacomo	s.t.
8	Juan Fernández (ESP)	Zor–Vereco	s.t.
9	Salvador Jarque (ESP)	Henninger	s.t.
10	Jose Luis Viejo (ESP)	Teka	s.t.

General classification after Stage 6

Rank	Rider	Team	Time
1	Faustino Rupérez (ESP)	Zor–Vereco	
2	Roberto Visentini (ITA)	San Giacomo	+ 2' 39"
3	Sean Kelly (IRL)	Splendor	+ 2' 41"

== Stage 7 ==
29 April 1980 — Viella to Jaca, 216 km (134 mi)

Stage 7 result

Rank	Rider	Team	Time
1	Faustino Rupérez (ESP)	Fosforera–Vereco MG	6h 25' 34"
2	Jose Luis Viejo (ESP)	Teka	s.t.
3	Pedro Torres (ESP)	Kelme–Gios	s.t.
4	Klaus-Peter Thaler (FRG)	Teka	s.t.
5	Sean Kelly (IRL)	Splendor	s.t.
6	Jesús Suárez Cueva (ESP)	Fosforera–Vereco MG	s.t.
7	Juan Fernández (ESP)	Zor–Vereco	s.t.
8	José Luis Laguía (ESP)	Reynolds	s.t.
9	Luis Alberto Ordiales (ESP)	Henninger	s.t.
10	Tranquillo Andreetta (ITA)	San Giacomo	s.t.

General classification after Stage 7

Rank	Rider	Team	Time
1	Faustino Rupérez (ESP)	Zor–Vereco	37h 37' 33"
2	Pedro Torres (ESP)	Kelme–Gios	+ 2' 56"
3	Roberto Visentini (ITA)	San Giacomo	+ 3' 00"
4	Sean Kelly (IRL)	Splendor	+ 3' 02"
5	Joseph Borguet (BEL)	Splendor	+ 3' 07"
6	Claude Criquielion (BEL)	Splendor	+ 3' 23"
7	Juan Pujol (ESP)	Kelme–Gios	+ 3' 26"
8	Francisco Galdós (ESP)	Kelme–Gios	s.t.
9	Guido Van Calster (BEL)	Splendor	+ 3' 27"
10	Jose Luis Viejo (ESP)	Teka	+ 3' 32"

== Stage 8 ==
30 April 1980 — Monastery of Leyre to Logroño, 160 km (99 mi)

Stage 8 result

Rank	Rider	Team	Time
1	Eulalio García (ESP)	Teka	4h 24' 41"
2	Johan van der Meer (NED)	HB Alarmsystemen	s.t.
3	Sean Kelly (IRL)	Splendor	s.t.
4	Klaus-Peter Thaler (FRG)	Teka	s.t.
5	Giuseppe Martinelli (ITA)	San Giacomo	s.t.
6	Etienne De Wilde (BEL)	Splendor	s.t.
7	Jesús Suárez Cueva (ESP)	Fosforera–Vereco MG	s.t.
8	Luis Alberto Ordiales (ESP)	Henninger	s.t.
9	Jos Lammertink (NED)	HB Alarmsystemen	s.t.
10	Javier Elorriaga (ESP)	Flavia-Gios	s.t.

General classification after Stage 8

Rank	Rider	Team	Time
1	Faustino Rupérez (ESP)	Zor–Vereco	42h 02' 14"
2	Pedro Torres (ESP)	Kelme–Gios	+ 2' 56"
3	Roberto Visentini (ITA)	San Giacomo	+ 3' 01"
4	Sean Kelly (IRL)	Splendor	+ 3' 02"
5	Joseph Borguet (BEL)	Splendor	+ 3' 07"
6	Claude Criquielion (BEL)	Splendor	+ 3' 23"
7	Juan Pujol (ESP)	Kelme–Gios	+ 3' 26"
8	Francisco Galdós (ESP)	Kelme–Gios	s.t.
9	Guido Van Calster (BEL)	Splendor	+ 3' 27"
10	Jose Luis Viejo (ESP)	Teka	+ 3' 32"

== Stage 9 ==
1 May 1980 — Logroño to Burgos, 138 km (86 mi)

Stage 9 result

Rank	Rider	Team	Time
1	Jos Lammertink (NED)	HB Alarmsystemen	3h 31' 56"
2	Ad Van Peer (NED)	HB Alarmsystemen	+ 3' 44"
3	Etienne De Wilde (BEL)	Splendor	+ 5' 24"
4	Alain De Roo (BEL)	San Giacomo	s.t.
5	Heddie Nieuwdorp (NED)	HB Alarmsystemen	s.t.
6	José Manuel García Rodríguez (ESP)	Henninger	s.t.
7	Juan Luis Juárez (ESP)	Flavia-Gios	s.t.
8	Sean Kelly (IRL)	Splendor	s.t.
9	Willy Albert (BEL)	Flavia-Gios	s.t.
10	Antonio Sobrino (ESP)	Colchón CR	s.t.

General classification after Stage 9

Rank	Rider	Team	Time
1	Faustino Rupérez (ESP)	Zor–Vereco	45h 39' 59"
2	Pedro Torres (ESP)	Kelme–Gios	+ 2' 56"
3	Roberto Visentini (ITA)	San Giacomo	+ 3' 00"
4	Sean Kelly (IRL)	Splendor	+ 3' 02"
5	Joseph Borguet (BEL)	Splendor	+ 3' 07"
6	Claude Criquielion (BEL)	Splendor	+ 3' 23"
7	Juan Pujol (ESP)	Kelme–Gios	+ 3' 26"
8	Francisco Galdós (ESP)	Kelme–Gios	s.t.
9	Guido Van Calster (BEL)	Splendor	+ 3' 27"
10	Jose Luis Viejo (ESP)	Teka	+ 3' 32"

== Stage 10 ==
2 May 1980 — Burgos to Santander, 178 km (111 mi)

Stage 10 result

Rank	Rider	Team	Time
1	Paul Jesson (NZL)	Splendor	4h 37' 57"
2	Johan van der Meer (NED)	HB Alarmsystemen	+ 15"
3	Claude Criquielion (BEL)	Splendor	+ 41"
4	Pedro Torres (ESP)	Kelme–Gios	s.t.
5	Bernard Thévenet (FRA)	Teka	+ 52"
6	Faustino Rupérez (ESP)	Zor–Vereco	s.t.
7	Marino Lejarreta (ESP)	Teka	s.t.
8	Enrique Martínez Heredia (ESP)	Teka	+ 1' 53"
9	Sean Kelly (IRL)	Splendor	s.t.
10	Miguel María Lasa (ESP)	Zor–Vereco	s.t.

General classification after Stage 10

Rank	Rider	Team	Time
1	Faustino Rupérez (ESP)	Zor–Vereco	50h 18' 38"
2	Pedro Torres (ESP)	Kelme–Gios	+ 2' 55"
3	Claude Criquielion (BEL)	Splendor	+ 3' 22"
4	Bernard Thévenet (FRA)	Teka	+ 3' 49"
5	Marino Lejarreta (ESP)	Teka	+ 4' 07"
6	Roberto Visentini (ITA)	San Giacomo	+ 4' 11"
7	Sean Kelly (IRL)	Splendor	+ 4' 13"
8	Joseph Borguet (BEL)	Splendor	+ 4' 18"
9	Juan Pujol (ESP)	Kelme–Gios	+ 4' 37"
10	Francisco Galdós (ESP)	Kelme–Gios	s.t.
