= Borguet =

Borguet is a French surname. Notable people with the surname include:

- Eric Borguet (fl. 1993), American chemical physicist
- Henri Borguet (died 1852), Belgian entrepreneur
- Joseph Borguet (born 1951), Belgian cyclist
