= Verschaeve =

Verschaeve is a surname. Notable people with the surname include:

- Cyriel Verschaeve (1874–1949), Flemish nationalist priest
- Roger Verschaeve (born 1951), Belgian racing cyclist
- Viktor Verschaeve (born 1998), Belgian former cyclist
