= 1977 Tour de Suisse =

Race details
- Dates: 15–24 June 1977
- Stages: 9 + Prologue
- Distance: 1,582 km (983.0 mi)
- Winning time: 41h 39' 25"

Results
	Winner	Michel Pollentier (BEL)	(Flandria–Velda–Latina Assicurazioni)
	Second	Lucien Van Impe (BEL)	(Lejeune–BP)
	Third	Bert Pronk (NED)	(TI–Raleigh)
	Points	Michel Pollentier (BEL)	(Flandria–Velda–Latina Assicurazioni)
	Mountains	Lucien Van Impe (BEL)	(Lejeune–BP)
	Combination	Lucien Van Impe (BEL)	(Lejeune–BP)
	Team	Zonca–Santini	

The 1977 Tour de Suisse was the 41st edition of the Tour de Suisse cycle race and was held from 15 June to 24 June 1977. The race started in Baden and finished in Effretikon. The race was won by Michel Pollentier of the Flandria team.

== General classification ==
Final general classification

Rank	Rider	Team	Time
1	Michel Pollentier (BEL)	Flandria–Velda–Latina Assicurazioni	41h 39' 25"
2	Lucien Van Impe (BEL)	Lejeune–BP	+ 58"
3	Bert Pronk (NED)	TI–Raleigh	+ 1' 26"
4	Ueli Sutter (SUI)	Zonca–Santini	+ 2' 00"
5	Juan Pujol (ESP)	Kas–Campagnolo	+ 2' 35"
6	Albert Zweifel (SUI)	Federale SRB	+ 3' 34"
7	Dietrich Thurau (FRG)	TI–Raleigh	+ 4' 26"
8	Johan De Muynck (BEL)	Brooklyn	+ 4' 36"
9	Marcello Bergamo (ITA)	Zonca–Santini	+ 6' 27"
10	Giancarlo Bellini (ITA)	Brooklyn	+ 6' 38"
