= Gallopin =

Gallopin is a French surname. Notable people with the surname include:

- Guy Gallopin (born 1956), French cyclist
- Joël Gallopin (born 1953), French cyclist
- Tony Gallopin (born 1988), French cyclist
