= 1980 Vuelta a España =

Race details
- Dates: 22 April – 11 May
- Stages: 19 stages + Prologue, including 1 split stages
- Distance: 3,225 km (2,004 mi)
- Winning time: 88h 23' 21"

Results
Jersey awarded to the overall winner	Winner	Faustino Rupérez (ESP)	(Zor - Vereco)
	Second	Pedro Torres (ESP)	(Kelme)
	Third	Claude Criquielion (BEL)	(Splendor)
Jersey awarded to the points classification winner	Points	Sean Kelly (IRL)	(Splendor)
	Mountains	Juan Fernández (ESP)	(Zor - Vereco)
	Sprints	Sean Kelly (IRL)	(Splendor)
	Team	Splendor	

The 35th Edition Vuelta a España (Tour of Spain), a long-distance bicycle stage race and one of the three grand tours, was held from 22 April to 11 May 1980. It consisted of 20 stages covering a total of 3,225 km (2,004 mi), and was won by Faustino Rupérez of the Zor cycling team.

Roberto Visentini won the prologue of the race and kept the leader's jersey for the first five days of the race. Sean Kelly finished second in the prologue and won the next two stages but did not get to wear the leader's jersey. On the first mountain stage, Faustino Rupérez came solo to the finish and took the leader's jersey which he kept until the end of the race. Pedro Torres put in an attack on the penultimate stage on the climb to Puerto de la Morcuera. However Rupérez together with Miguel Mari Lasa bridged up to Torres halfway to Alto de Cotos and the leader's jersey was safe. Rupérez won the race ahead of Torres and Claude Criquielion. Criquielion's Splendor teammate Kelly won five stages of the race, the points jersey and finished fourth overall. Marino Lejarreta finished the race fifth overall. Juan Fernández won the Mountains competition.

== Route ==
List of stages
Stage	Date	Course	Distance	Type	Winner
P	22 April	La Manga to La Manga	10 km (6 mi)	Individual time trial	Roberto Visentini (ITA)
1	23 April	La Manga to Benidorm	155 km (96 mi)		Sean Kelly (IRL)
2	24 April	Benidorm to Cullera	170 km (106 mi)		Sean Kelly (IRL)
3	25 April	Cullera to Vinaròs	207 km (129 mi)		Giuseppe Martinelli (ITA)
4	26 April	Vinaròs to Sant Quirze del Vallès	214 km (133 mi)		Klaus-Peter Thaler (FRG)
5	27 April	Sant Quirze del Vallès to La Seu d'Urgell	200 km (124 mi)		Faustino Rupérez (ESP)
6	28 April	La Seu d'Urgell to Viella	131 km (81 mi)		Enrique Martínez Heredia (ESP)
7	29 April	Viella to Jaca	216 km (134 mi)		Faustino Rupérez (ESP)
8	30 April	Monastery of Leyre to Logroño	160 km (99 mi)		Eulalio García (ESP)
9	1 May	Logroño to Burgos	138 km (86 mi)		Jos Lammertink (NED)
10	2 May	Burgos to Santander	178 km (111 mi)		Paul Jesson (NZL)
11	3 May	Santander to Gijón	219 km (136 mi)		Jesús López Carril (ESP)
12	4 May	Santiago de Compostela to Pontevedra	133 km (83 mi)		Etienne De Wilde (BEL)
13	5 May	Pontevedra to Vigo	195 km (121 mi)		Rolf Haller (FRG)
14	6 May	Vigo to Ourense	156 km (97 mi)		Sean Kelly (IRL)
15	7 May	Ourense to Ponferrada	164 km (102 mi)		Francisco Elorriaga (ESP)
16a	8 May	Ponferrada to León	131 km (81 mi)		Dominique Arnaud (FRA)
16b	8 May	León to León	22.8 km (14 mi)	Individual time trial	Roberto Visentini (ITA)
17	9 May	León to Valladolid	138 km (86 mi)		Sean Kelly (IRL)
18	10 May	Valladolid to Los Ángeles de San Rafael	197 km (122 mi)		Manuel Esparza (ESP)
19	11 May	Madrid to Madrid	84 km (52 mi)		Sean Kelly (IRL)
	Total		3,225 km (2,004 mi)		

== Results ==
=== Final General Classification ===
Rank	Rider	Team	Time
1	(Spain) Faustino Rupérez	Zor-Vereco	88h 23' 21"
2	(Spain) Pedro Torres	Kelme-Gios	+ 2' 15"
3	(Belgium) Claude Criquielion	Splendor-Admiral	+ 3' 00"
4	(Republic of Ireland) Sean Kelly	Splendor-Admiral	+ 3' 31"
5	(Spain) Marino Lejarreta	Teka	+ 4' 32"
6	(Belgium) Guido Van Calster	Splendor-Admiral	+ 4' 44"
7	(Belgium) Johan De Muynck	Splendor-Admiral	+ 4' 58"
8	(Spain) Francisco Galdós	Kelme-Gios	+ 5' 00"
9	(Spain) Miguel María Lasa	Zor-Vereco	+ 5' 25"
10	(Spain) Vicente Belda	Kelme-Gios	+ 6' 41"
11	(Spain) Manuel Esparza Sanz	Teka	
12	(Spain) Faustino Fernandez	Henninger-Aquila Rossa	
13	(Belgium) Jos Borguet	Splendor-Admiral	
14	(France) Bernard Thévenet	Teka	
15	(Italy) Roberto Visentini	San Giacomo-Benotto	
16	(Spain) Juan Fernández Martín	Zor-Vereco	
17	(Spain) Ángel Arroyo	Zor-Vereco	
18	(Spain) Pedro Vilardebo	Flavia-Gios	
19	(Spain) Francisco Codony	Manzaneque-Alan	
20	(Spain) Antonio Gonzalez	Colchon C.R.	
21	(Spain) José-Luis Laguia	Reynolds-Benotto	
22	(Spain) José Enrique Cima	Henninger-Aquila Rossa	
23	(Spain) Ricardo Zuniga Xarrasco	Manzaneque-Alan	
24	(Spain) Juan Pujol Pages	Kelme-Gios	
25	(Netherlands) Peter Zijerveld	HB Alarmsystemen	
