= 1978 Critérium du Dauphiné Libéré =

Race details
- Dates: 29 May – 5 June 1978
- Stages: 7 + Prologue
- Distance: 1,325 km (823 mi)
- Winning time: 36h 23' 03"

Results
Jersey awarded to the overall winner	Winner	Michel Pollentier (BEL)	(Flandria–Velda–Lano)
	Second	Mariano Martínez (FRA)	(Jobo–Spidel–La Roue d'Or)
	Third	Francisco Galdós (ESP)	(Kas–Campagnolo)
	Points	Jacques Esclassan (FRA)	(Peugeot–Esso–Michelin)
	Mountains	Mariano Martínez (FRA)	(Jobo–Spidel–La Roue d'Or)
	Team	Miko–Mercier–Vivagel	

The 1978 Critérium du Dauphiné Libéré was the 30th edition of the cycle race and was held from 29 May to 5 June 1978. The race started in Thonon-les-Bains and finished in Carpentras. The race was won by Michel Pollentier of the Flandria team.

== Teams ==
Ten teams, containing a total of 100 riders, participated in the race:

- C&A
- Jobo–Spidel–La Roue d'Or
- Miko–Mercier–Vivagel
- Fiat
- Kas–Campagnolo
- Peugeot–Esso–Michelin
- Flandria–Velda–Lano
- Lejeune–BP
- TI–Raleigh–McGregor
- Teka

== Route ==
Stage characteristics and winners
Stage	Date	Course	Distance	Type	Winner
P	29 May	Thonon-les-Bains	8 km (5.0 mi)	Individual time trial	Hennie Kuiper (NED)
1	30 May	Thonon-les-Bains to Mâcon	246.8 km (153.4 mi)		Maurice Le Guilloux (FRA)
2a	31 May	Mâcon to Montceau-les-Mines	103 km (64 mi)		Andrés Oliva (ESP)
2b	31 May	Montceau-les-Mines to Roanne	111 km (69 mi)		Jacques Esclassan (FRA)
3	1 June	Roanne to Villeurbanne	212 km (132 mi)		Jacques Martin (BEL)
4	2 June	Villeurbanne to Grenoble	172 km (107 mi)		Christian Seznec (FRA)
5	3 June	Grenoble to Prapoutel	116 km (72 mi)		Michel Pollentier (BEL)
6	4 June	Allevard-les-Bains to Gap	175 km (109 mi)		Jean-Pierre Danguillaume (FRA)
7a	5 June	Gap to Carpentras	150 km (93 mi)		Freddy Maertens (BEL)
7b	5 June	Carpentras	29 km (18 mi)	Individual time trial	Michel Pollentier (BEL)

== General classification ==
Final general classification

Rank	Rider	Team	Time
1	Michel Pollentier (BEL)	Flandria–Velda–Lano	36h 23' 03"
2	Mariano Martínez (FRA)	Jobo–Spidel–La Roue d'Or	+ 3' 03"
3	Francisco Galdós (ESP)	Kas–Campagnolo	+ 4' 40"
4	Joop Zoetemelk (NED)	Miko–Mercier–Vivagel	+ 5' 53"
5	Sven-Åke Nilsson (SWE)	Miko–Mercier–Vivagel	+ 6' 33"
6	Christian Seznec (FRA)	Miko–Mercier–Vivagel	+ 8' 17"
7	José Nazabal (ESP)	Kas–Campagnolo	+ 8' 22"
8	Robert Alban (FRA)	Miko–Mercier–Vivagel	+ 8' 58"
9	Hennie Kuiper (NED)	TI–Raleigh–McGregor	+ 11' 11"
10	Ferdinand Julien (FRA)	Jobo–Spidel–La Roue d'Or	+ 11' 55"
