= 1973 Tour de Romandie =

Race details
- Dates: 8–13 May 1973
- Stages: 5 + Prologue
- Distance: 889 km (552 mi)
- Winning time: 24h 12' 39"

Results
	Winner	Wilfried David (BEL)
	Second	Lucien Van Impe (BEL)
	Third	Michel Pollentier (BEL)

The 1973 Tour de Romandie was the 27th edition of the Tour de Romandie cycle race and was held from 8 May to 13 May 1973. The race started in Geneva and finished in Lancy. The race was won by Wilfried David.

== General classification ==
Final general classification
Rank	Rider	Time
1	Wilfried David (BEL)	24h 12' 39"
2	Lucien Van Impe (BEL)	+ 2' 52"
3	Michel Pollentier (BEL)	+ 3' 44"
4	Mariano Martínez (FRA)	+ 4' 39"
5	Giancarlo Polidori (ITA)	+ 4' 41"
6	Felice Gimondi (ITA)	+ 5' 15"
7	Ole Ritter (DEN)	+ 5' 36"
8	Gösta Pettersson (SWE)	+ 5' 58"
9	Gonzalo Aja (ESP)	+ 6' 07"
10	Giovanni Cavalcanti (ITA)	+ 6' 43"
