= 1971 Tour de Suisse =

Race details
- Dates: 11–18 June 1971
- Stages: 10
- Distance: 1,319 km (819.6 mi)
- Winning time: 34h 05' 30"

Results
	Winner	Georges Pintens (BEL)	(Hertekamp)
	Second	Louis Pfenninger (SUI)	(Zimba–Mondia)
	Third	Ugo Colombo (ITA)	(Filotex)
	Points	Roger De Vlaeminck (BEL)	(Flandria–Mars)
	Mountains	Louis Pfenninger (SUI)	(Zimba–Mondia)
	Team	Filotex	

The 1971 Tour de Suisse was the 35th edition of the Tour de Suisse cycle race and was held from 11 June to 18 June 1971. The race started in Zürich and finished in Olten. The race was won by Georges Pintens of the Hertekamp team.

== General classification ==
Final general classification

Rank	Rider	Team	Time
1	Georges Pintens (BEL)	Hertekamp	34h 05' 30"
2	Louis Pfenninger (SUI)	G.B.C.–Zimba	+ 42"
3	Ugo Colombo (ITA)	Filotex	+ 56"
4	Roger De Vlaeminck (BEL)	Flandria–Mars	+ 1' 16"
5	Arnaldo Caverzasi (ITA)	Filotex	+ 2' 12"
6	André Poppe (BEL)	Hertekamp	+ 3' 57"
7	Edward Janssens (BEL)	Flandria–Mars	+ 5' 53"
8	Bernard Vifian (SUI)	Möbel Märki–Bonanza	+ 6' 34"
9	Willy Van Neste (BEL)	Flandria–Mars	+ 7' 01"
10	Giovanni Cavalcanti (ITA)	Filotex	+ 7' 28"
