= Michel Balbuena =

Spanish cyclist

Personal information
- Born: 7 August 1954 (age 72)

Cycling career
- Sport: Cycling
- Role: Rider

Michel Balbuena (born 7 August 1954) is a Spanish racing cyclist. He rode in the 1979 Tour de France.
