= Luigino Moro =

Italian cyclist

Personal information
- Born: 15 November 1956 (age 69) Valdobbiadene, Italy

Cycling career
- Sport: Cycling
- Role: Rider

Luigino Moro (born 15 November 1956) is an Italian former professional racing cyclist. He rode in two editions of the Tour de France.
