= Emiel De Haes =

Belgian cyclist

Personal information
- Born: 2 August 1955 (age 71)

Cycling career
- Sport: Cycling
- Role: Rider

Emiel De Haes (born 2 August 1955) is a Belgian racing cyclist. He rode in the 1979 Tour de France.
