= Jos Van de Poel =

Belgian cyclist

Personal information
- Born: 18 February 1954 (age 72)

Cycling career
- Sport: Cycling
- Role: Rider

Jos Van de Poel (born 18 February 1954) is a Belgian racing cyclist. He rode in the 1979 Tour de France.
