= Henri Borguet =

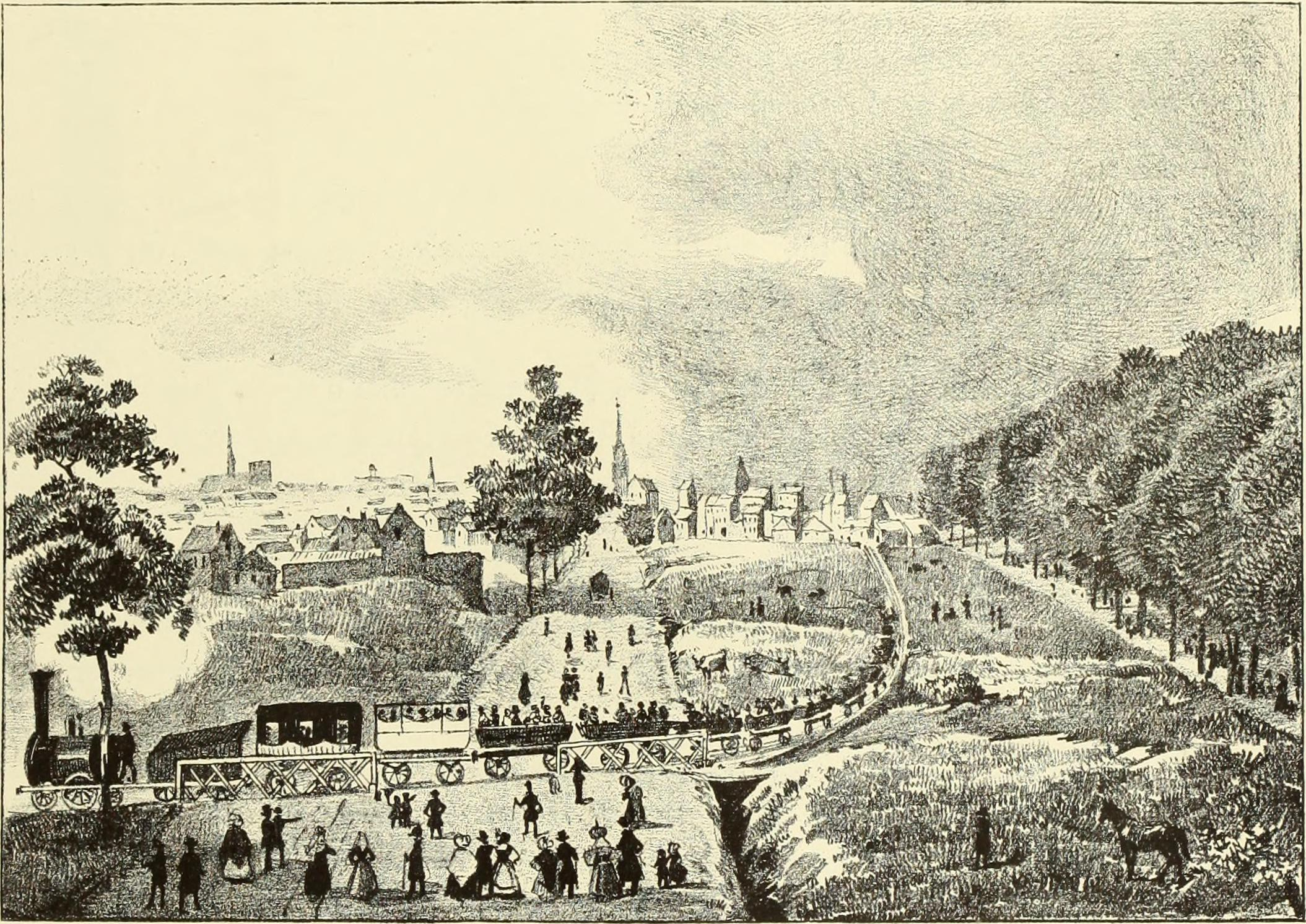
The railway in Brussels (Allée Verte) in 1884

Henri Borguet was Belgian entrepreneur who built in Belgium the first steam passenger railway in continental Europe, between Brussels and Mechelen.

== History ==
Considering that the railways would be a major economic resource and a full national network would be necessary, the Belgian government approved in 1834 a plan to build a railway between Mons, and the port of Antwerp via Brussels at a cost of 150 million Belgian francs. The first stretch of the Belgian railway network, between northern Brussels and Mechelen, was completed in 1835 becoming the first steam passenger railway in continental Europe.

The proposed direct line between Antwerp and the Prussian border was rerouted through Mechelen, from which a short stub line to Brussels could be built, Leuven, Liège and Verviers. This itinerary was longer and more complicated but it would be more profitable and generate more traffic. Another line could connect Mechelen with Dendermonde, Ghent, Bruges and Ostend to grant a safe access to the sea since the Dutch were able to blockade the Scheldt, cutting Antwerp away from the sea). Finally, a southbound line would link Brussels and Mons, an industrial town at the heart of the Sillon industriel, before crossing the French border, near Quiévrain.

The building of Belgian railways started with the experimental 20-km long line "Brussels-Mechelen". The Belgian government ordered three locomotives to the George Stephenson based on the Rocket design, to operate the line. The three locomotives were named La Flèche ("Arrow"), L'Eléphant, and Stephenson, after their designer.

== Life ==
Borguet won on 27 May 1834 the tender to build a 20-km long line "Brussels-Mechelen". Borguet's company carried out the earthworks, built three bridges and 43 culverts. It also built the foundations of the line and laid the main track and sidetracks in Brussels, Vilvoorde and Mechelen. The fencing and paving for the crossing of 20 roads were also built. On 5 October 1834, Borguet's company laid the first rails in the vicinity of Vilvoorde. The locomotive "La Flèche" was able to carry out its first tests on 19 October 1834. On May 5, 1835, the first railway in continental Europe opened between the north of Brussels (Groendreef/Allée Verte) and Mechelen.

Borguet's company also build the railway line from Namur to Liege.

For his contribution to the construction of the Belgian railway system, Borguet was elevated to the rank of Knight in the Order of Leopold on 14 July 1842. He died on 24 September 1852 and is buried in Sorée in the Walloon municipality of Gesves.
