= Giovanni Cavalcanti (cyclist) =

Italian cyclist

Personal information
- Born: 17 November 1943 (age 82) Sant'Agata sul Santerno, Italy

Cycling career
- Sport: Cycling
- Current team: Retired
- Discipline: Road
- Role: Rider

Professional teams
- 1969: Gris 2000
- 1970: Salvarani
- 1971–1972: Filotex
- 1973–1979: Bianchi–Campagnolo

Giovanni Cavalcanti (born 17 November 1943) is an Italian former racing cyclist. He rode in the 1975 Tour de France, where he notably finished second on stage 12.

== Major results ==
1967
1st Stage 9 Tour de l'Avenir
1969
3rd GP Forli
1971
6th Coppa Placci
8th Coppa Bernocchi
10th Overall Giro d'Italia
10th Overall Tour de Suisse
1973
10th Overall Tour de Romandie
1974
7th GP Cemab
8th Giro di Romagna
1975
4th Giro del Veneto

=== Grand Tour general classification results timeline ===
Grand Tour	1969	1970	1971	1972	1973	1974	1975	1976	1977	1978	1979
Giro d'Italia	21	18	10	17	17	21	16	34	26	52	—
Tour de France	—	—	—	—	—	—	48	—	38	—	DNF
Vuelta a España	—	—	—	—	—	—	—	—	—	—	—
