= Didier Bourrier =

French cyclist

Personal information
- Born: 18 May 1955
- Died: 26 October 1987 (aged 32)

Cycling career
- Sport: Cycling
- Role: Rider

Didier Bourrier (18 May 1955 – 26 October 1987) was a French racing cyclist. He rode in the 1979 Tour de France.
