= Gérard Macé (cyclist) =

French cyclist (born 1953)

Personal information
- Born: 9 July 1953 (age 73)

Cycling career
- Sport: Cycling
- Role: Rider

Gérard Macé (born 9 July 1953) is a French racing cyclist. He rode in the 1979 Tour de France.
