= Jacques Verbrugge =

Dutch cyclist

Personal information
- Born: 24 April 1955 (age 71)

Cycling career
- Sport: Cycling
- Role: Rider

Jacques Verbrugge (born 24 April 1955) is a Dutch racing cyclist. He rode in the 1979 Tour de France.
