= Christian Dumont (cyclist) =

Belgian cyclist (born 1956)

Personal information
- Born: 2 February 1956 (age 70) Esneux

Cycling career
- Sport: Cycling
- Role: Rider

Christian Dumont (born 2 February 1956) is a Belgian racing cyclist. He rode in the 1979 Tour de France.
