= Peter Zijerveld =

Dutch cyclist

Personal information
- Born: 16 March 1955 (age 71) De Kwakel, Netherlands
- Weight: 63 kg (139 lb)

Cycling career
- Sport: Cycling
- Role: Rider

Professional teams
- July 1979-1981: HB Alarmsystemen
- 1982: DAF Trucks - TeVe-blad

Peter Zijerveld (born 16 March 1955) is a Dutch former professional racing cyclist and triathlete. He rode in one edition of the Tour de France and two editions of the Vuelta a España.

In 1983 NIKE asked him to ride triathlons professionally. He went to San Diego where he exchanged knowledge about cycling, learned how to swim (better) and bought an aerodynamic helmet. Back in the Netherlands he put his helmet on in the first triathlon he rode. Its package didn't have an instruction, so he put the helmet on backwards! 'We were all pioneers.'

== Main results ==
1979
1st Omloop het Volk amateurs
1980
25th general classification 1980 Vuelta a España

2nd in stage 15 of the 1980 Vuelta
4th in stage 12 of the 1980 Vuelta
10th in stage 16a of the 1980 Vuelta

8th Grand Prix Pino Cerami
1981
1st Mountain classification Vuelta a Andalucía
5th general classification 1981 Paris–Nice

7th in stage 4 of the 1981 Paris-Nice
8th in stage 9 of the 1981 Paris-Nice

15th general classification 1981 Vuelta a España

6th in stage 17 of the 1981 Vuelta
9th in stage 14 of the 1981 Vuelta
9th in stage 15a of the 1981 Vuelta

1983
3rd Dutch National Championships Triathlon in Almere
1985
1st European Championships Triathlon middle distance in Aabenraa - 4:10.05
1st Triathlon of Veenendaal - 4:12.41
