= Walter Polini =

Italian cyclist

Personal information
- Born: 17 March 1955 Bergamo, Italy
- Died: 8 December 2002 (aged 47) Turin, Italy

Cycling career
- Sport: Cycling
- Role: Rider

Walter Polini (17 March 1955 – 8 December 2002) is an Italian racing cyclist. He rode in the 1979 Tour de France.

He died in 8 December 2002 due to heart attack.
