= Dorino Vanzo =

Italian cyclist

Personal information
- Born: 22 February 1950 (age 76) Riese Pio X

Cycling career
- Sport: Cycling
- Role: Rider

Dorino Vanzo (born 22 February 1950) is an Italian racing cyclist. He rode in the 1979 Tour de France.
