= Glauco Santoni =

Italian cyclist

Personal information
- Born: 19 January 1952 (age 74) Verucchio, Italy

Cycling career
- Sport: Cycling
- Role: Rider

Glauco Santoni (born 19 January 1952) is an Italian former professional racing cyclist. He rode in four editions of the Tour de France.
