= Paul Jesson (cyclist) =

New Zealand cyclist

Personal information
- Born: 14 January 1955 (age 71) Christchurch, New Zealand

Cycling career
- Sport: Cycling
- Current team: Retired
- Discipline: Road
- Role: Rider

Professional team
- 1979–1981: Splendor

Major wins
- Grand Tours Vuelta a España 1 individual stage (1980)

Paul Jesson (born 14 January 1955) is a retired New Zealand professional racing cyclist. Jesson became the first New Zealander to win a stage at a grand tour when he won Stage 10 of the 1980 Vuelta a España.

Jesson's first professional race for Splendor was the 1979 Tour de France. This occurred because his team did not have enough riders to start. He rode for about two weeks before being eliminated by finishing a stage outside the time limit.

In the prologue of the 1980 Critérium du Dauphiné Libéré Jesson hit a parked car resulting in a serious crash. He was admitted to hospital where he was unconscious for a week and had his leg amputated below the knee. Although the injury ended his professional racing career he did go on to win medals at the Paralympics

== Major results ==
1976
1st Overall Tour of Southland
1st Dulux Six Day Tour of the North Island
1st Overall Ster Van Henegouwen

1st Stage 7

1977
2nd Overall Tour of Southland
1st Tour of Manawatu
1978
1st Overall Tour of Southland
2nd Overall Tour de Wallonie
2nd Overall Tour de Liège
1979
4th Omloop van de Vlaamse Scheldeboorden
1980
1st Stage 10 Vuelta a España
2nd Ronde de Montauroux
3rd Nokere Koerse
1998
1st 4000m Paralympic Pursuit World Championship
1st 18km Time trial Paralympic World Championship
2004
3rd Summer Paralympics Road race/Time trial

=== Grand Tour results ===
Grand Tour	1979	1980
Vuelta a España	–	29
Giro d'Italia	–	–
Tour de France	DNF	–
