= Jorge Ruiz Cabestany =

Spanish cyclist

Personal information
- Born: 22 November 1956 (age 69) San Sebastián, Spain

Cycling career
- Sport: Cycling
- Role: Rider

Jorge Ruiz Cabestany (born 22 November 1956) is a Spanish racing cyclist. He rode in the 1981 Tour de France.
