= Alex Van Linden =

Belgian cyclist

Personal information
- Born: 5 May 1952 (age 74) Antwerp, Belgium

Cycling career
- Sport: Cycling

Alex Van Linden (born 5 May 1952) is a Belgian former cyclist. He competed in the team pursuit event at the 1972 Summer Olympics.
