= Alain De Roo =

Belgian cyclist

Personal information
- Born: 27 November 1955 (age 70) Ghent, Belgium

Cycling career
- Sport: Cycling
- Role: Rider

Alain De Roo (born 27 November 1955) is a Belgian former professional racing cyclist. He rode in two editions of the Tour de France.
