= 1977 Giro d'Italia =

Race details
- Dates: 20 May – 12 June 1977
- Stages: 22 + Prologue, including four split stages
- Distance: 3,968 km (2,466 mi)
- Winning time: 107h 27' 16"

Results
Jersey awarded to the overall winner	Winner	Michel Pollentier (BEL)	(Flandria)
	Second	Francesco Moser (ITA)	(Sanson)
	Third	Gianbattista Baronchelli (ITA)	(Scic)
Jersey awarded to the points classification winner	Points	Francesco Moser (ITA)	(Sanson)
Jersey awarded to the mountains classification winner	Mountains	Faustino Fernández Ovies (ESP)	(KAS)
Jersey awarded to the youth classification winner	Youth	Mario Beccia (ITA)	(Sanson)
Jersey awarded to the sprints classification winner	Sprints	Wilmo Francioni (ITA)	(Magniflex)
	Team	Flandria	

The 1977 Giro d'Italia was the 60th running of the Giro, one of cycling's Grand Tours. It started in Bacoli, on 20 May, with a 7 km (4.3 mi) prologue and concluded in Milan, on 13 June, with a 122 km (75.8 mi) mass-start stage. A total of 130 riders from thirteen teams entered the 22-stage race, that was won by Belgian Michel Pollentier of the Flandria team. The second and third places were taken by Italians Francesco Moser and Gianbattista Baronchelli, respectively. Freddy Maertens won 7 of the first 11 stages before abandoning due to a crash on Stage 8B.

Maertens was one of five riders within 1:00 of the lead at the time of his abandonment. This followed his performance of winning 13 stages along with the General Classification at the Vuelta a month earlier.

Moser took the Pink jersey from Maertens in the first week and held it until the high mountains of stage 17 which ended in Cortina d'Ampezzo where Pollentier took a :03 lead by beating Moser by :25. Over the next few stages he built this lead up to about 2:00 before the final time trial where he won the stage by :30 over 2nd place Moser and sealed the Giro victory.

Amongst the other classifications that the race awarded, Sanson's Moser won the points classification, Faustino Fernández Ovies of KAS won the mountains classification, and Sanson's Mario Beccia completed the Giro as the best neo-professional in the general classification, finishing ninth overall. Flandria finished as the winners of the team points classification.

== Teams ==
Fourteen teams were invited by the race organizers to participate in the 1977 edition of the Giro d'Italia. In total, 90 riders were from Italy, while the remaining 50 riders came from: Spain (20), Belgium (17), Switzerland (4), Denmark (2), West Germany (2), Australia (1), France (1), Great Britain (1), Norway (1), and Sweden (1). Each team sent a squad of ten riders, which meant that the race started with a peloton of 140 cyclists.

Of those starting, 52 were riding the Giro d'Italia for the first time. The average age of riders was 27.29 years, ranging from 20–year–old Per Bausager (Zoppas Frag) to 36–year–old Franco Bitossi (Vibor). The team with the youngest average rider age was GBC (24), while the oldest was Brooklyn (30). From those that started, 121 of them finish in Milan.

The teams entering the race were:

- Bianchi
- Brooklyn
- Fiorella
- GBC
- Jolly Ceramica
- KAS
- Flandria
- Magniflex
- Sanson
- Scic
- Selle Royal
- Teka
- Vibor
- Zonca

== Pre-race favorites ==
The starting peloton did include the 1976 winner, Felice Gimondi. Freddy Maertens, Gianbattista Baronchelli, and Gimondi were seen by many news outlets to be the favorites to win the race.

== Route and stages ==
The route for the race was revealed on 19 February 1977.

Stage characteristics and winners
Stage	Date	Course	Distance	Type	Winner
P	20 May	Bacoli to Monte di Procida	7 km (4 mi)	Individual time trial	Freddy Maertens (BEL)
1	21 May	Lago Miseno to Avellino	159 km (99 mi)	Plain stage	Freddy Maertens (BEL)
2a	22 May	Avellino to Foggia	118 km (73 mi)	Plain stage	Rik Van Linden (BEL)
2b	22 May	Foggia to Foggia	65 km (40 mi)	Plain stage	Luciano Borgognoni (ITA)
3	23 May	Foggia to Isernia	166 km (103 mi)	Plain stage	Simone Fraccaro (ITA)
4	24 May	Isernia to Pescara	228 km (142 mi)	Plain stage	Freddy Maertens (BEL)
5	25 May	Pescara to Monteluco di Spoleto	215 km (134 mi)	Stage with mountain(s)	Mario Beccia (ITA)
6a	26 May	Spoleto to Gabicce Mare	185 km (115 mi)	Plain stage	Freddy Maertens (BEL)
6b	26 May	Gabicce Mare to Gabicce Mare	70 km (43 mi)	Plain stage	Freddy Maertens (BEL)
7	27 May	Gabicce Mare to Forlì	163 km (101 mi)	Stage with mountain(s)	Freddy Maertens (BEL)
8a	28 May	Forlì to Circuito del Mugello	103 km (64 mi)	Stage with mountain(s)	Freddy Maertens (BEL)
8b	28 May	Circuito del Mugello to Circuito del Mugello	79 km (49 mi)	Plain stage	Marino Basso (ITA)
9	29 May	Lucca to Pisa	25 km (16 mi)	Individual time trial	Knut Knudsen (NOR)
10	30 May	Pisa to Salsomaggiore Terme	205 km (127 mi)	Stage with mountain(s)	Giacinto Santambrogio (ITA)
11	31 May	Salsomaggiore Terme to Santa Margherita Ligure	198 km (123 mi)	Stage with mountain(s)	Claudio Bortolotto (ITA)
	1 June	Rest day			
12	2 June	Santa Margherita Ligure-San Giacomo di Roburent	160 km (99 mi)	Stage with mountain(s)	Wilmo Francioni (ITA)
13	3 June	Mondovì to Varzi	192 km (119 mi)	Stage with mountain(s)	Giancarlo Tartoni (ITA)
14	4 June	Voghera to Vicenza	247 km (153 mi)	Plain stage	Marc Demeyer (BEL)
15	5 June	Vicenza to Trieste	223 km (139 mi)	Plain stage	Ercole Gualazzini (ITA)
16a	6 June	Trieste to Gemona del Friuli	107 km (66 mi)	Plain stage	Marc Demeyer (BEL)
16b	6 June	Gemona del Friuli to Conegliano	116 km (72 mi)	Plain stage	Pierino Gavazzi (ITA)
17	7 June	Conegliano to Cortina d'Ampezzo	220 km (137 mi)	Stage with mountain(s)	Giuseppe Perletto (ITA)
18	8 June	Cortina d'Ampezzo to Pinzolo	223 km (139 mi)	Stage with mountain(s)	Gianbattista Baronchelli (ITA)
19	9 June	Pinzolo to San Pellegrino Terme	205 km (127 mi)	Stage with mountain(s)	Renato Laghi (ITA)
20	10 June	San Pellegrino Terme to Varese	138 km (86 mi)	Plain stage	Wilmo Francioni (ITA)
21	11 June	Binago to Binago	29 km (18 mi)	Individual time trial	Michel Pollentier (BEL)
22	12 June	Milan to Milan	122 km (76 mi)	Plain stage	Luciano Borgognoni (ITA)
	Total		3,968 km (3,968 km)		

== Classification leadership ==
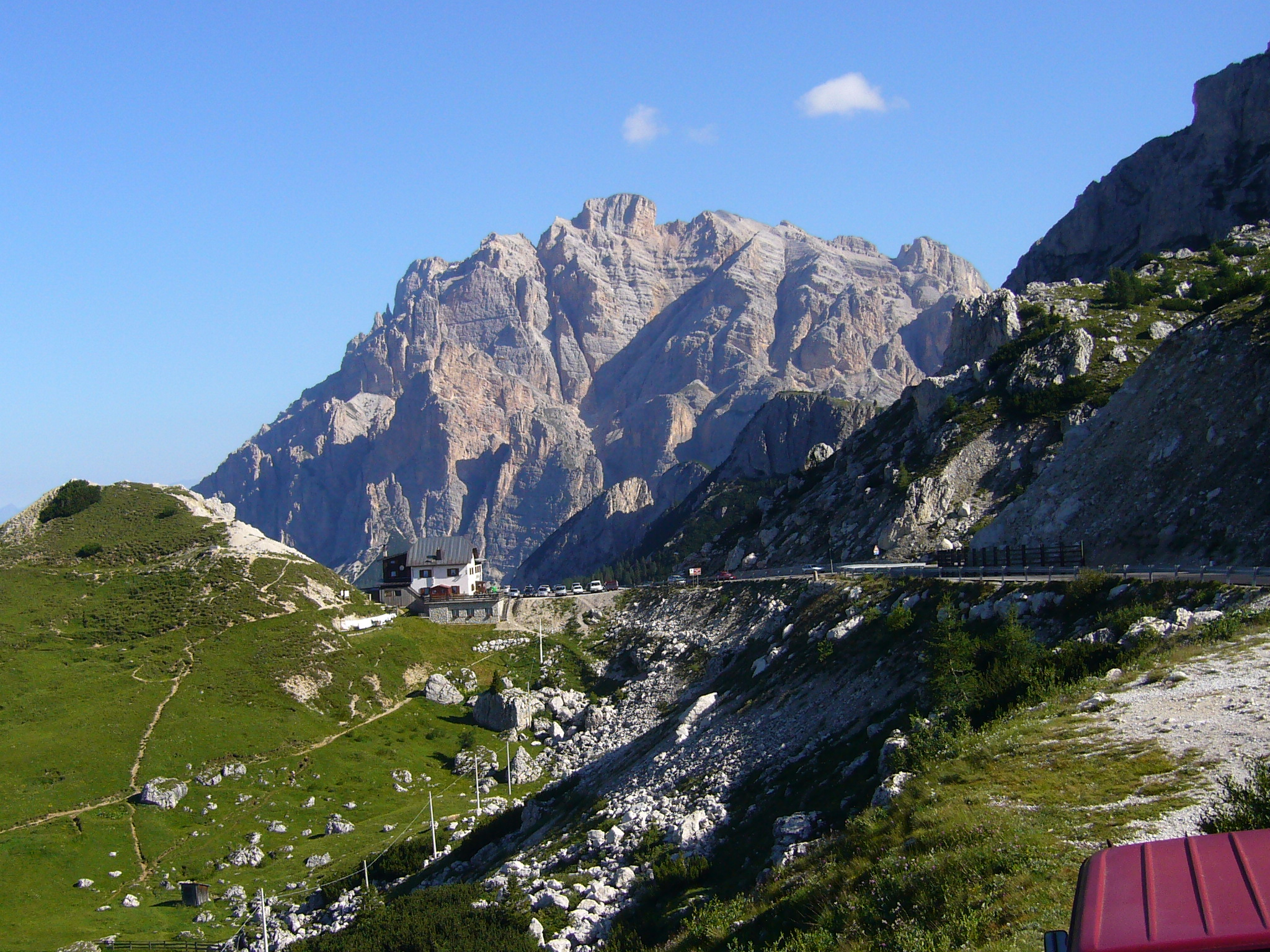
The Valparola Pass was the Cima Coppi for the 1977 running of the Giro d'Italia.

There were four main individual classifications contested in the 1977 Giro d'Italia, as well as a team competition. Four of them awarded jerseys to their leaders. The general classification was the most important and was calculated by adding each rider's finishing times on each stage. The rider with the lowest cumulative time was the winner of the general classification and was considered the overall winner of the Giro. The rider leading the classification wore a pink jersey to signify the classification's leadership.

The second classification was the points classification. Riders received points for finishing in the top positions in a stage finish, with first place getting the most points, and lower placings getting successively fewer points. The rider leading this classification wore a purple (or cyclamen) jersey.

The mountains classification was the third classification and its leader was denoted by the green jersey. In this ranking, points were won by reaching the summit of a climb ahead of other cyclists. Each climb was ranked as either first, second or third category, with more points available for higher category climbs. Most stages of the race included one or more categorized climbs, in which points were awarded to the riders that reached the summit first. The Cima Coppi, the race's highest point of elevation, awarded more points than the other first category climbs. The Cima Coppi for this Giro was the Valparola Pass. The first rider to cross the Valparola Pass was Spanish rider Faustino Fernández Ovies.

The fourth classification, the young rider classification, was decided the same way as the general classification, but exclusive to neo-professional cyclists (in their first three years of professional racing). The leader of the classification wore a white jersey.

Another classification was the team classification, awarded no jersey to its leaders. This was calculated by adding together points earned by each rider on the team during each stage through the intermediate sprints, the categorized climbs, stage finishes, etc. The team with the most points led the classification.

There were other minor classifications within the race, including the Campionato delle Regioni classification. The leader wore a blue jersey with colored vertical stripes ("maglia azzurra con banda tricolore verticale").

The Fiat classification, created the year before, was repeated again In all stages longer than 127 km (79 mi), there was a banner at that point in the stage to designate a special sprint. The winner of the sprint in each stage received a Fiat 127 in this edition, as opposed to a Fiat 131 in its inaugural year.

Classification leadership by stage
Stage	Winner	General classification	Points classification	Mountains classification	Young rider classification	Campionato delle Regioni	FIAT	Team classification
P	Freddy Maertens	Freddy Maertens	Freddy Maertens	not awarded	José Enrique Cima	not awarded	not awarded	Flandria
1	Freddy Maertens	Freddy Maertens	Freddy Maertens	not awarded	José Enrique Cima	?	Jesús Suárez Cueva	Flandria
2a	Rik Van Linden	Freddy Maertens	Freddy Maertens	Faustino Fernández Ovies	José Enrique Cima	?	Jesús Suárez Cueva	Flandria
2b	Luciano Borgognoni	Freddy Maertens	Freddy Maertens	Faustino Fernández Ovies	José Enrique Cima	?	Jesús Suárez Cueva	Flandria
3	Simone Fraccaro	Freddy Maertens	Freddy Maertens	Francesco Moser	José Enrique Cima	Ercole Gualazzini	Jesús Suárez Cueva	Flandria
4	Freddy Maertens	Freddy Maertens	Freddy Maertens	Francesco Moser	José Enrique Cima	Ercole Gualazzini	Jesús Suárez Cueva	Flandria
5	Mario Beccia	Francesco Moser	Freddy Maertens	Faustino Fernández Ovies	Mario Beccia	Ercole Gualazzini	Jesús Suárez Cueva	Flandria
6a	Freddy Maertens	Francesco Moser	Freddy Maertens	Faustino Fernández Ovies	Mario Beccia	Ercole Gualazzini	Jesús Suárez Cueva	Flandria
6b	Freddy Maertens	Francesco Moser	Freddy Maertens	Faustino Fernández Ovies	Mario Beccia	Ercole Gualazzini	Jesús Suárez Cueva	Flandria
7	Freddy Maertens	Francesco Moser	Freddy Maertens	Faustino Fernández Ovies	Mario Beccia	Ercole Gualazzini	Jesús Suárez Cueva	Flandria
8a	Freddy Maertens	Francesco Moser	Freddy Maertens	Faustino Fernández Ovies	Mario Beccia	Ercole Gualazzini	Jesús Suárez Cueva	Flandria
8b	Marino Basso	Francesco Moser	Freddy Maertens	Faustino Fernández Ovies	Mario Beccia	Ercole Gualazzini	Jesús Suárez Cueva	Flandria
9	Knut Knudsen	Francesco Moser	Francesco Moser	Faustino Fernández Ovies	Mario Beccia	Ercole Gualazzini	Jesús Suárez Cueva	Flandria
10	Giacinto Santambrogio	Francesco Moser	Francesco Moser	Faustino Fernández Ovies	Mario Beccia	Ercole Gualazzini	Jesús Suárez Cueva	Flandria
11	Claudio Bortolotto	Francesco Moser	Francesco Moser	Faustino Fernández Ovies	Mario Beccia	Ercole Gualazzini	Jesús Suárez Cueva	Flandria
12	Wilmo Francioni	Francesco Moser	Francesco Moser	Faustino Fernández Ovies	Mario Beccia	Ercole Gualazzini	Jesús Suárez Cueva	Flandria
13	Giancarlo Tartoni	Francesco Moser	Francesco Moser	Faustino Fernández Ovies	Mario Beccia	Ercole Gualazzini	Jesús Suárez Cueva	Flandria
14	Marc Demeyer	Francesco Moser	Francesco Moser	Faustino Fernández Ovies	Mario Beccia	Ercole Gualazzini	Jesús Suárez Cueva	Flandria
15	Ercole Gualazzini	Francesco Moser	Francesco Moser	Faustino Fernández Ovies	Mario Beccia	Ercole Gualazzini	Jesús Suárez Cueva	Flandria
16a	Marc Demeyer	Francesco Moser	Francesco Moser	Faustino Fernández Ovies	Mario Beccia	Ercole Gualazzini	Jesús Suárez Cueva	Flandria
16b	Pierino Gavazzi	Francesco Moser	Francesco Moser	Faustino Fernández Ovies	Mario Beccia	Ercole Gualazzini	Jesús Suárez Cueva	Flandria
17	Giuseppe Perletto	Michel Pollentier	Francesco Moser	Faustino Fernández Ovies	Mario Beccia	Wilmo Francioni	Jesús Suárez Cueva	Flandria
18	Gianbattista Baronchelli	Michel Pollentier	Francesco Moser	Faustino Fernández Ovies	Mario Beccia	Wilmo Francioni	Jesús Suárez Cueva	Flandria
19	Renato Laghi	Michel Pollentier	Francesco Moser	Faustino Fernández Ovies	Mario Beccia	Wilmo Francioni	Jesús Suárez Cueva	Flandria
20	Wilmo Francioni	Michel Pollentier	Francesco Moser	Faustino Fernández Ovies	Mario Beccia	Wilmo Francioni	Jesús Suárez Cueva	Flandria
21	Michel Pollentier	Michel Pollentier	Francesco Moser	Faustino Fernández Ovies	Mario Beccia	Wilmo Francioni	Jesús Suárez Cueva	Flandria
22	Luciano Borgognoni	Michel Pollentier	Francesco Moser	Faustino Fernández Ovies	Mario Beccia	Wilmo Francioni	Jesús Suárez Cueva	Flandria
Final		Michel Pollentier	Francesco Moser	Faustino Fernández Ovies	Mario Beccia	Giacinto Santambrogio	Jesús Suárez Cueva	Flandria

== Final standings ==
Legend
Pink jersey	Denotes the winner of the General classification
Purple jersey	Denotes the winner of the Points classification
Green jersey	Denotes the winner of the Mountains classification
Blue white	Denotes the winner of the Young rider classification
Blue jersey	Denotes the winner of the Campionato delle Regioni classification

=== General classification ===
Final general classification (1–10)
Rank	Name	Team	Time
1	Michel Pollentier (BEL)	Flandria	107h 27' 16"
2	Francesco Moser (ITA)	Sanson	+ 2' 32"
3	Gianbattista Baronchelli (ITA)	Scic	+ 4' 02"
4	Alfio Vandi (ITA)	Magniflex	+ 7' 50"
5	Wladimiro Panizza (ITA)	Scic	+ 7' 56"
6	Ronald De Witte (BEL)	Brooklyn	+ 10' 04"
7	Walter Riccomi (ITA)	Scic	+ 12' 28"
8	Claudio Bortolotto (ITA)	Sanson	+ 13' 41"
9	Mario Beccia (ITA)	Sanson	+ 13' 48"
10	Wilmo Francioni (ITA)	Magniflex	+ 16' 11"

=== Points classification ===
Final points classification (1-9)
	Rider	Team	Points
1	Francesco Moser (ITA)	Sanson	225
2	Pierino Gavazzi (ITA)	Scic	183
3	Luciano Borgognoni (ITA)	Scic	183
4	Michel Pollentier (BEL)	Flandria	153
5	Wilmo Francioni (ITA)	Magniflex	143
6	Marc Demeyer (BEL)	Flandria	141
7	Enrico Paolini (ITA)	Scic	133
8	Gianbattista Baronchelli (ITA)	Scic	123
9	Miguel María Lasa (ESP)	Teka	105
9	Aldo Parecchini (ITA)	Brooklyn	105

=== Mountains classification ===
Final mountains classification (1-10)
	Rider	Team	Points
1	Faustino Fernández Ovies (ESP)	Kas–Campagnolo	675
2	Ueli Sutter (SUI)	Zonca–Santini	490
3	Michel Pollentier (BEL)	Flandria	340
4	Mario Beccia (ITA)	Sanson	220
5	Renato Laghi (ITA)	Vibor	195
6	Gianbattista Baronchelli (ITA)	Scic	175
7	Alfio Vandi (ITA)	Magniflex	120
8	Giuseppe Perletto (ITA)	Perletto	110
8	José-Luis Viejo (ESP)	KAS	110
10	Wladimiro Panizza (ITA)	Scic	100

=== Young rider classification ===
Final young rider classification (1-5)
	Rider	Team	Time
1	Mario Beccia (ITA)	Sanson	107h 41' 04"
2	Vittorio Algeri (ITA)	G.B.C.	+ 7' 34"
3	Amilcare Sgalbazzi (ITA)	Jolly Ceramica	+ 11' 27"
4	Bernt Johansson (SWE)	Fiorella	+ 14' 13"
5	Carmelo Barone (ITA)	Fiorella	+ 21' 28"

=== Campionato delle Regioni classification ===
Final Campionato delle Regioni classification (1-8)
	Rider	Team	Points
1	Wilmo Francioni (ITA)	Magniflex	37
2	Gianfranco Foresti (ITA)	Scic	12
3	Giacinto Santambrogio (ITA)	Bianchi	10
4	Aldo Parecchini (ITA)	Brooklyn	10
5	Pietro Algeri (ITA)	G.B.C.	8
5	Claudio Bortolotto (ITA)	Sanson	8
5	Marcello Osler (ITA)	Brooklyn	8
8	Bruno Zanoni (ITA)	G.B.C.	6

=== Traguardo Fiat 127 classification ===
Final Traguardo Fiat 127 classification (1-4)
	Rider	Team	Points
1	Jesús Suárez Cueva (ESP)	Teka	33
2	Domingo Perurena (ESP)	KAS	26
3	Adriano Pella (ITA)	Selle Royal	18
4	Gianbattista Baronchelli (ITA)	Scic	3
4	Aldo Donadello (ITA)	Sanson	3
4	Miguel María Lasa (ESP)	Teka	3
4	Wladimiro Panizza (ITA)	Scic	3
4	Aldo Parecchini (ITA)	Brooklyn	3
4	Alfio Vandi (ITA)	Magniflex	3

=== Team points classification ===
Final team points classification (1-10)
	Team	Points
1	Flandria	11,886
2	Sanson	11,078
3	Scic	7,154
4	Flandria	5,633
5	Jolly Ceramica	4558?
6	Vibor	3443
7	Bianchi	3362
8	Brooklyn	3209
9	Selle Royal	3184
10	KAS	3070

== Doping ==
There was one positive doping test in the Giro of 1977: Annunzio Colombo received a time penalty of ten minutes following the 12th stage.
