= Michel Pollentier =

Belgian cyclist

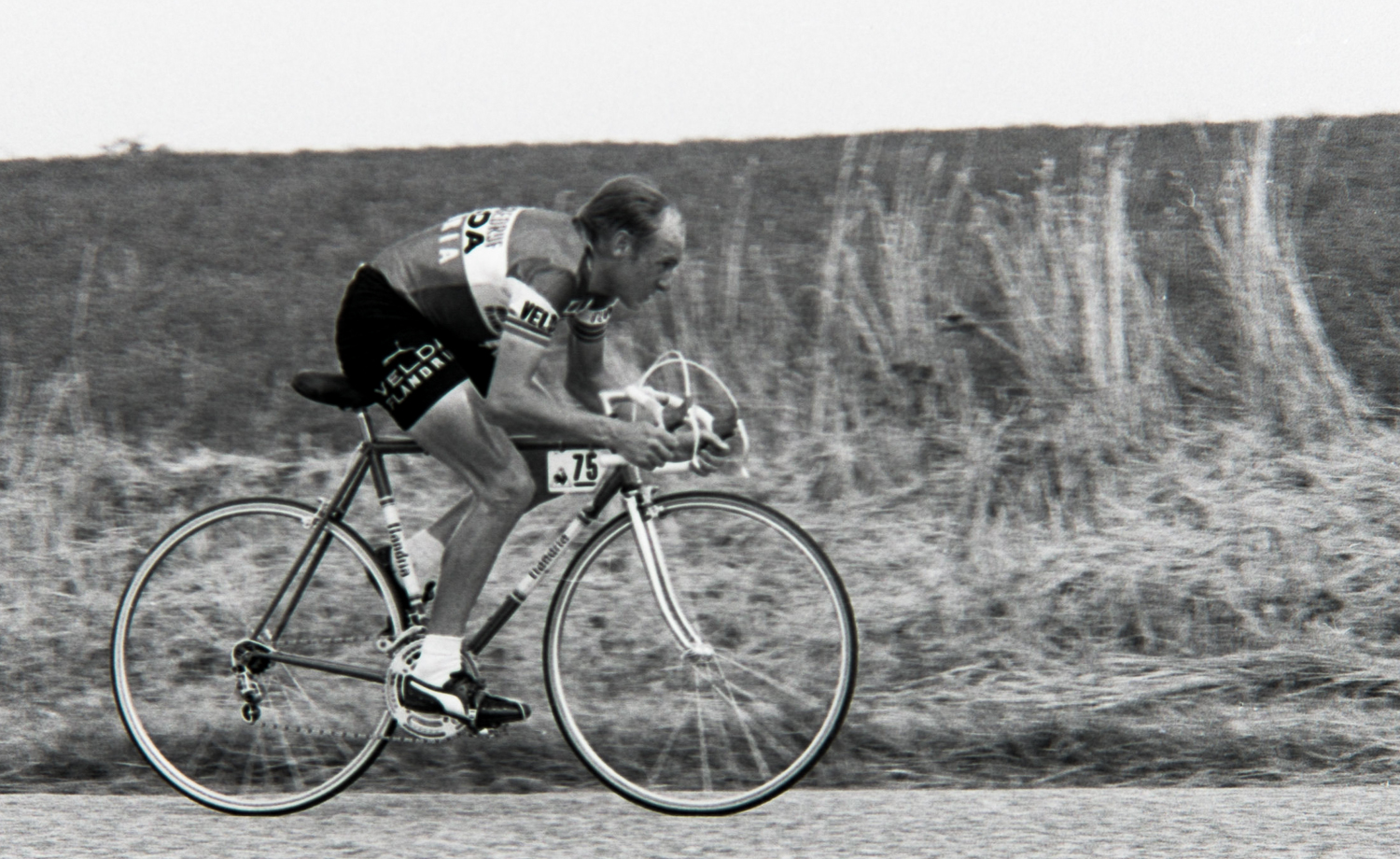
- Pollentier at the 1976 Tour de France

Personal information
- Full name: Michel Pollentier
- Born: 13 February 1951 (age 75) Diksmuide, Belgium

Cycling career
- Sport: Cycling
- Discipline: Road
- Role: Rider

Professional teams
- 1973–1978: Flandria–Carpenter–Shimano
- 1979–1980: Splendor–Euro Soap
- 1981: Vermeer Thijs
- 1982–1984: Safir–Marc

Major wins
- Grand Tours Tour de France 3 individual stages (1974, 1975, 1976) Giro d'Italia General classification (1977) 1 individual stage (1977) Vuelta a España 2 individual stages (1977, 1984) Stage races Critérium du Dauphiné Libéré (1978) Tour de Suisse (1977) One-day races and Classics National Road Race Championships (1977, 1978) Tour of Flanders (1980)

Michel Pollentier (born 13 February 1951) is a Belgian former professional road bicycle racer.

He became professional in 1973. The highlight of his career was his overall win in the 1977 Giro d'Italia. Pollentier is one of just three Belgian riders to win the Giro, the others being Eddy Merckx and Johan de Muynck.

In the 1978 Tour de France, he was the Belgian national champion when he won the stage arriving in Alpe d'Huez, took the yellow jersey and would have been involved in a battle with Joop Zoetemelk and eventual winner Bernard Hinault for the remainder of the race as the three were within +0:30 of one another. However, he was accused of foul play in the succeeding doping test, having used what was described politely as a pear-shaped tube (in fact a condom) of different urine held under the armpit and connected by a plastic tube to give the impression of urinating. Pollentier was uncovered after another rider at the test had trouble operating his own system of tubes and aroused the suspicion of the doctor, who then demanded Pollentier lift his jersey to show if he too was cheating. He was put out of the Tour immediately.

The affair took away most of Pollentier's credibility in international cycling. Even though he won the 1980 edition of the Tour of Flanders and he also came 3rd in the 1982 Vuelta a España where he was the beneficiary of a doping incident when the initial winner was disqualified bringing him to 2nd overall. 1984 was his last professional season; he finished outside the top 10 at the Vuelta and won the final grand tour stage of his career.

After his cycling career, Pollentier became a car tyre garage owner and founded a cycling school.

In "Seigneurs et Forcats du Velo" by Olivier Dazat, Pollentier is quoted as saying that he and another named Belgian cycling champion of the era had trouble after their careers because of drugs they had taken while racing. Dazat quotes him as saying: "I've never hesitated to confess that I spent three weeks under the surveillance of Dr Dejonckheere at the St-Joseph clinic at Ostend and that after treatment... I stayed under his control for another two years. Why hide it? It's impossible to come out of a situation like that without the help of a doctor.'

== Career achievements ==
=== Major results ===
1971
1st Gent – Staden
10th Ronde Van Vlaanderen Beloften
1973
2nd Tour du Loir-et-Cher
3rd Overall Tour de Romandie
4th Overall Étoile des Espoirs
6th Kattekoers
9th Paris–Tours
1974
4th Overall Vuelta a Andalucía
4th Kampioenschap van Vlaanderen
7th Boucles de l'Aulne
7th Overall Tour de France

1st Stage 21b (ITT)

9th Overall Tour de Luxembourg
1975
1st Stage 13 Tour de France
1st Stage 6 Critérium du Dauphiné Libéré
2nd Overall Tour of Belgium
2nd Brabantse Pijl
2nd Trofeo Baracchi
4th Paris–Brussels
4th Druivenkoers Overijse
5th Amstel Gold Race
6th Kuurne–Brussels–Kuurne
8th Overall Vuelta a Andalucía
8th Gran Premio di Lugano
10th Gent–Wevelgem
1976
1st Overall Tour of Belgium

1st Stage 3

1st Overall Escalada a Montjuïc

1st Stage 1c (ITT)

1st Giro del Piemonte
1st Stadsprijs Geraardsbergen
1st Trofeo Baracchi (with Freddy Maertens)
2nd Overall Tour de Suisse

1st Stages 2, 4a & 9b (ITT)

4th Overall Ronde van Nederland
7th Overall Tour de France

1st Stage 16

8th Grand Prix de Wallonie
10th Züri-Metzgete
1977
1st Road race, National Road Championships
1st Overall Giro d'Italia

1st Stage 21 (ITT)

1st Overall Tour de Suisse

1st Prologue, Stages 3a, 3b (ITT) & 9b (ITT)

1st Gouden Pijl Emmen
2nd Grand Prix of Aargau Canton
3rd Setmana Catalana de Ciclisme
4th Grand Prix de Wallonie
5th Tour of Flanders
6th Overall Vuelta a España

1st Stage 4 (ITT)

7th Trofeo Laigueglia
8th Liège–Bastogne–Liège
1978
1st Road race, National Road Championships
1st Overall Critérium du Dauphiné Libéré

1st Stages 5 & 7b (ITT)

1st Overall Escalada a Montjuïc

1st Stages 1a (ITT), 1b & 1c (ITT)

1st Overall Vuelta a Mallorca

1st Stages 1a & 2a

2nd Tour of Flanders
4th Overall Tour of Belgium
4th Omloop van het Houtland
5th Overall Tirreno–Adriatico
5th La Flèche Wallonne
5th Critérium des As
6th Brabantse Pijl
8th Overall Tour de Suisse

1st Stages 4b (ITT) & 9b (ITT)

10th Giro di Lombardia
10th Gent–Wevelgem
1979
1st GP du Tournaisis
3rd Overall Vuelta a España
3rd E3 Prijs Vlaanderen
4th Overall Tour of Belgium
4th Brabantse Pijl
5th Omloop Het Volk
7th Overall Tirreno–Adriatico
7th Liège–Bastogne–Liège
1980
1st Tour of Flanders
1st Brabantse Pijl
2nd Le Samyn
5th Overall Tour of Belgium
5th Road race, National Road Championships
8th Overall Tirreno–Adriatico
1981
8th Overall Étoile de Bessèges
1982
1st Omloop van het Houtland
2nd Overall Vuelta a España
4th Tour of Flanders
6th Road race, UCI Road World Championships
1983
3rd Overall Three Days of De Panne
7th Tour of Flanders
7th La Flèche Wallonne
1984
1st Stage 6 Vuelta a España

=== Grand Tour general classification results timeline ===
Grand Tour	1973	1974	1975	1976	1977	1978	1979	1980	1981	1982	1983	1984
Vuelta a España	—	—	—	—	6	—	3	26	—	2	—	13
Giro d'Italia	—	—	—	—	1	—	—	—	—	—	—	—
Tour de France	34	7	23	7	—	DSQ	DNF	DNF	DNF	—	—	—

Legend
—	Did not compete
DNF	Did not finish
DSQ	Disqualified

== See also ==
- List of doping cases in cycling
