= Roger Verschaeve =

Belgian cyclist

Personal information
- Born: 23 May 1951 (age 75)

Cycling career
- Sport: Cycling
- Role: Rider

Roger Verschaeve (born 23 May 1951) is a Belgian racing cyclist. He rode in the 1974 Tour de France.
