= Jos Lammertink =

Dutch cyclist (1958–2024)

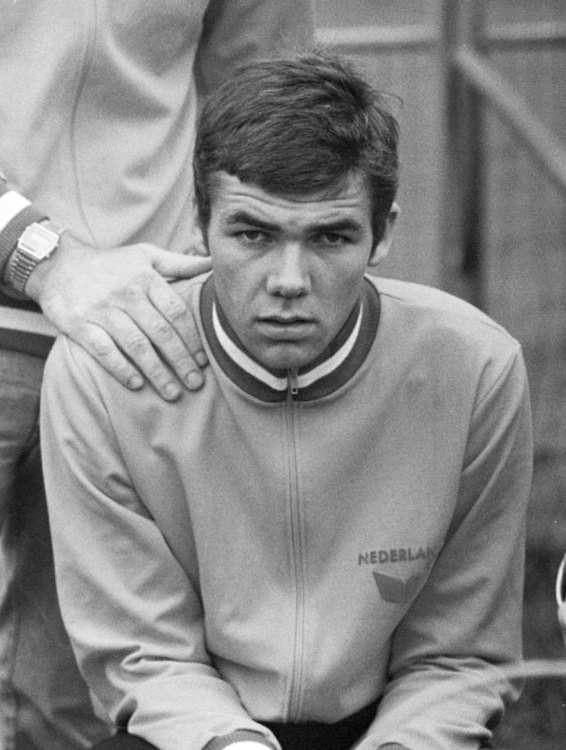
- Lammertink in 1979

Personal information
- Born: 28 March 1958 Wierden, Overijssel, Netherlands
- Died: 24 November 2024 (aged 66)

Cycling career
- Sport: Cycling
- Discipline: Road racing
- Role: Rider

Professional teams
- 1980-1981: HB Alarmsystemen
- 1982: B&S Wegenbouw-Elro Snacks
- 1983: Vivi - Benotto
- 1984-1986: Panasonic
- 1987-1988: Transvemij-Van Schilt
- 1989: Transvemij-Van Ragno

Major wins
- Dutch National Road Race Championship (1986), Kuurne–Brussels–Kuurne (1984), 9th stage in 1980 Vuelta, 6th stage in 1981 Vuelta

Jos Lammertink (28 March 1958 – 24 November 2024) was a Dutch road bicycle racer. He won the Dutch title in the men's road race in 1986. That same year he was involved in a crash during stage four of the Tour de France that forced him to abandon, suffering from a fracture on his left front skull. Lammertink died from respiratory failure on 24 November 2024, at the age of 66.

== Teams ==
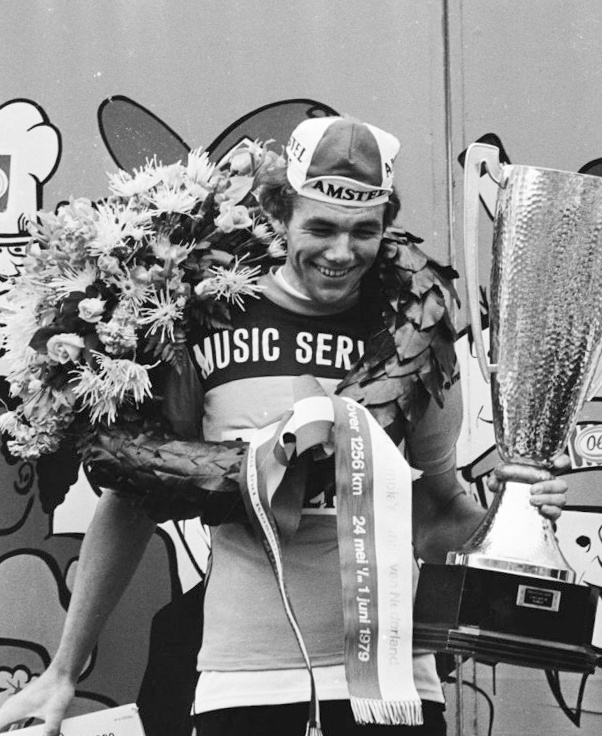
Jos Lammertink, 1979

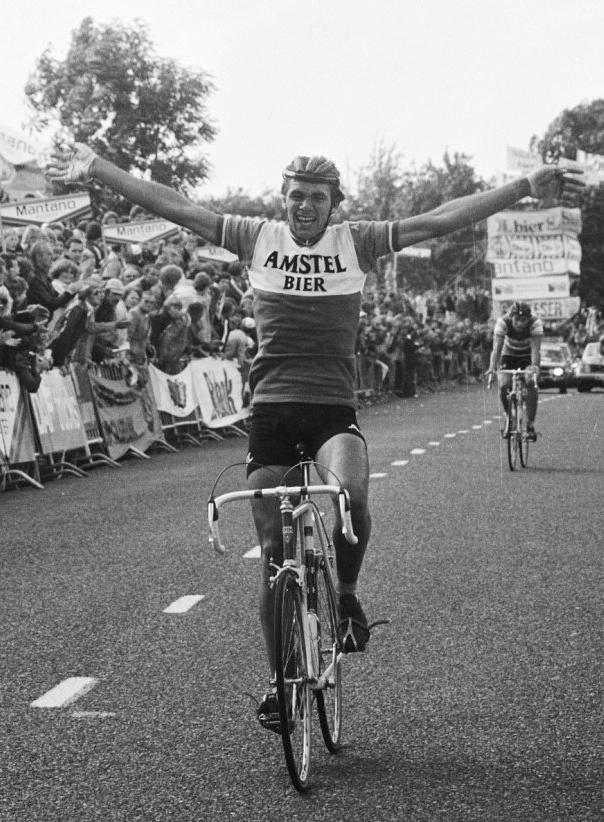
Jos Lammertink, 1978

- 1980: HB Alarmsystemen (Netherlands)
- 1981: HB Alarmsystemen (Netherlands)
- 1982: B&S Wegenbouw-Elro Snacks (Netherlands)
- 1983: Vivi – Benotto (Italy)
- 1984: Panasonic (Netherlands)
- 1985: Panasonic (Netherlands)
- 1986: Panasonic (Netherlands)
- 1987: Transvemij-Van Schilt (Netherlands)
- 1988: TVM-Van Schilt (Netherlands)
- 1989: TVM-Ragno (Netherlands)

Sporting positions
| Preceded by Jacques Hanegraaf | Dutch National Road Race Champion; 1986 | Succeeded by Adri van der Poel |
