= Rolf Haller =

German cyclist (born 1957)

Personal information
- Born: 9 August 1957 (age 69) Germany

Cycling career
- Sport: Cycling
- Role: Rider

Rolf Haller (born 9 August 1957 in Villingen-Schwenningen) is a German former racing cyclist. He rode in the 1980 Tour de France.
