= Pedro Vilardebó =

Spanish cyclist (1953–2004)

Personal information
- Born: 16 October 1953 Santa Eulàlia de Ronçana, Spain
- Died: 22 October 2004 (aged 51) Santa Eulàlia de Ronçana, Spain

Cycling career
- Sport: Cycling
- Discipline: Road
- Role: Rider

Professional teams
- 1977–1978: Teka
- 1979: Kas–Campagnolo
- 1980: Flavia–Gios
- 1981: Colchón CR–Campagnolo

Pedro Vilardebó (16 October 1953 – 22 October 2004) was a Spanish racing cyclist. He rode in the 1978 Tour de France.

== Major results ==
1977
3rd Trofeo Masferrer
4th Overall Escalada a Montjuich
1978
1st Stage 3b Vuelta a los Valles Mineros
3rd Overall Setmana Catalana de Ciclisme
7th Overall Escalada a Montjuich
9th GP Navarra
10th Overall Volta a Catalunya
1979
2nd Overall Volta a Catalunya

1st Stage 1

2nd Overall Escalada a Montjuich
3rd GP Villafranca de Ordizia
1980
6th Overall Tour of the Basque Country
9th Overall Vuelta a Andalucía

=== Grand Tour general classification results timeline ===
Grand Tour	1977	1978	1979	1980
Giro d'Italia	58	76	—	—
Tour de France	—	40	DNF	—
Vuelta a España	—	—	—	18
