= Faustino Fernández =

Spanish cyclist

Personal information
- Full name: Faustino Fernández Ovies
- Born: 16 February 1953 (age 73) El Berrón, La Carrera, Spain

Cycling career
- Sport: Cycling
- Current team: Retired
- Discipline: Road
- Role: Rider

Professional teams
- 1976–1978: Kas–Campagnolo
- 1979: Teka
- 1980: Henninger–Aquila Rossa–Zeus

Major wins
- Grand Tours Giro d'Italia Mountains classification (1977) Stage races Vuelta a Aragón (1980)

Faustino Fernández Ovies (born 16 February 1953) is a former Spanish racing cyclist.

A professional for five seasons, Ovies is best known for winning the mountain classification at the 1977 Giro d'Italia, and the 1980 Vuelta Ciclista a Aragón. His best placing on a grand tour was 12th at the 1980 Vuelta a Espana.

== Major results ==
1976
2nd Overall Vuelta a Segovia
1977
1st Mountains classification Giro d'Italia
1978
1st Subida a Arrate
1979
1st Stage 3 Vuelta a los Valles Mineros
2nd Overall Vuelta a Asturias

1st Stage 3

3rd Overall Vuelta a Cantabria
1980
1st Overall Vuelta a Aragón

1st Stage 1
