= Splendor (cycling team) =

Team information
- Registered: Belgium
- Founded: 1975
- Disbanded: 1989
- Discipline: Road

Team name history
- 1975 1976 1977 1978 1979 January–June 1980 June–December 1980 1980 Tour de France 1981–1982 1983 January–June 1984 June–December 1984 1985 1986 1986 Tour de France 1987 1988 1989 1989 Giro d'Italia 1989 Tour de France: Splendor–Struvay; Zoppas–Splendor–Sinalco; Carpenter–Zeepcentrale–Splendor; Old Lord's–Splendor–K.S.B. Splendor–Euro Soap; Splendor; Splendor–Admiral; Splendor–Admiral–TV-Ekspres; Splendor–Wickes Bouwmarkt–Europ Decor; Splendor–Euro Shop; Splendor–Jacky Aernoudt; Splendor–Mondial Moquettes–Marc; Hitachi–Splendor–Sunair; Hitachi–Marc–Splendor; Hitachi–Robland; Hitachi–Marc; Hitachi–Bosal–B.C.E. Snooker; Hitachi; Hitachi–Zonca; Hitachi–VTM
Splendor jersey
Jersey

Splendor was a Belgian professional cycling team that existed from 1975 to 1989.

Splendor Team sponsors, rider rosters and results are available.

Rossin Bikes was also a co-sponsor and supplied their bicycles for the 1977 Team Zoppas - Fragel-Splendor season and again for the 1987 Team Hitachi - Marc - Rossin season.

It won the team classification of the 1980 Vuelta a España.
