= Juan Pujol (cyclist) =

Spanish cyclist

Personal information
- Born: 28 May 1952 (age 74)

Cycling career
- Sport: Cycling
- Role: Rider

Juan Pujol (born 28 May 1952) is a Spanish former racing cyclist. He finished 10th in the 1976 Giro d'Italia and rode in the 1978 Tour de France.
