= Joseph Borguet =

Belgian cyclist

Personal information
- Born: 16 April 1951 (age 75) Liège, Belgium

Cycling career
- Sport: Cycling
- Role: Rider

Joseph Borguet (born 16 April 1951) is a former Belgian racing cyclist. He rode the 1979 and 1980 Tour de France.
