= Cima Coppi =

Title given to the highest peak during the Giro d'Italia

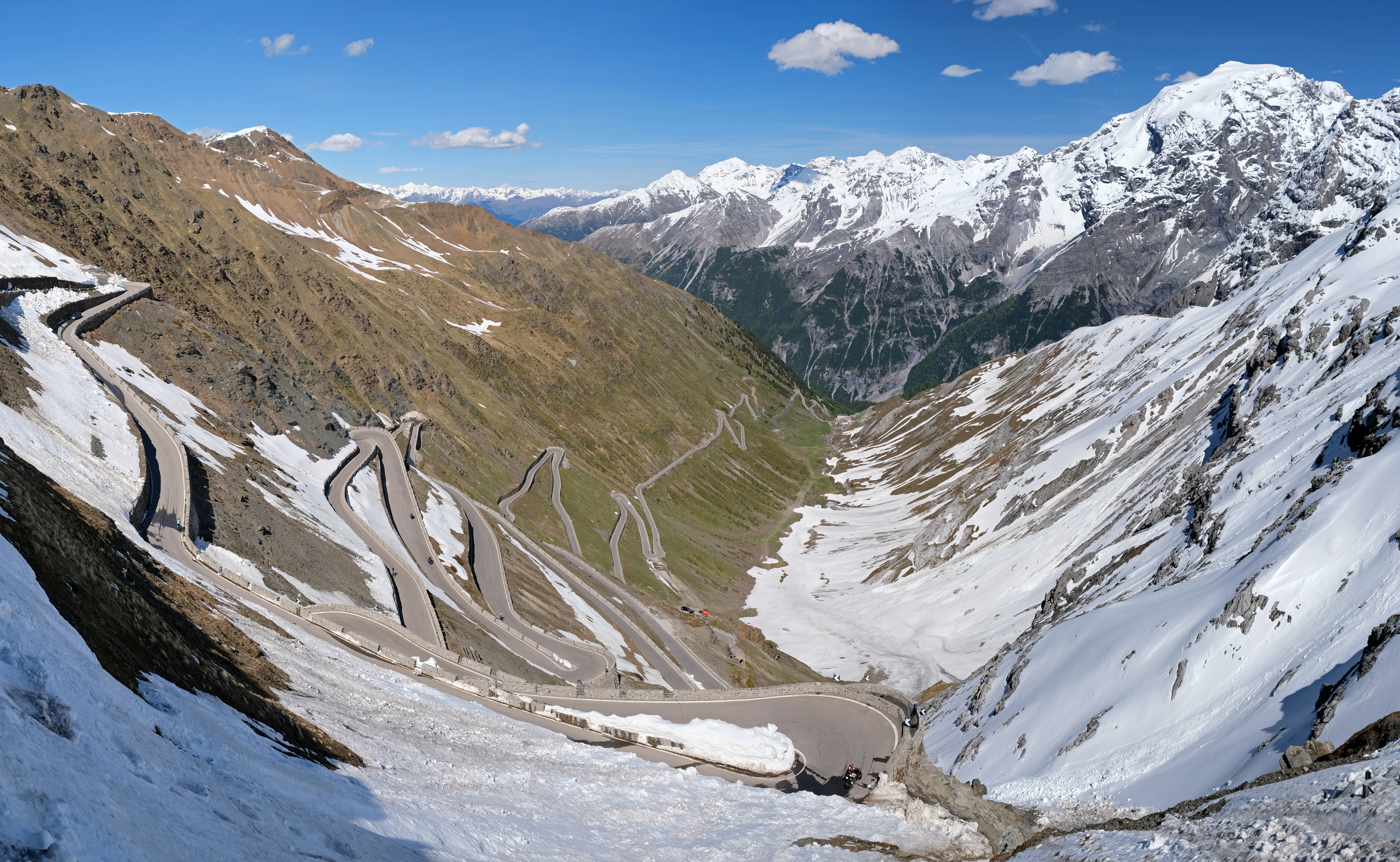
The Stelvio Pass, the highest road ever taken by the Giro.

The Cima Coppi is the title given to the highest peak in the yearly running of the Giro d'Italia, one of cycling's Grand Tour races. The mountain that is given this title each year awards more mountains classification points to the first rider than any of the other categorized mountains in the race.

== History ==
The categorization was first introduced for the 1965 Giro d'Italia in honor of the late Fausto Coppi who won five editions of the Giro d'Italia and three mountain classification titles during his career. It was first announced on 22 April 1965 by then race director Vincenzo Torriani that the highest peak would award two times as many mountains classification points. Torriani thought of possibly awarding time bonuses to the first to summit the mountain; however, after many dissenting opinions, he opted to award more mountains classification points.

The Cima Coppi changes from year to year, depending on the altitude profile of the Giro d'Italia, but the Cima Coppi par excellence is the Stelvio Pass, which at 2758m is the highest point ever reached by the Giro. The Stelvio has been used in the 1972, 1975, 1980, 1994, 2005, 2012, 2014, 2017 and 2020 editions. It was also scheduled in 1965, 1988, 2013, and 2024, but in each case the course was modified due to weather conditions, with various effects on the Cima Coppi designation.

== List ==
Key
*	Point was also used as the location of the stage finish
~	Climb was used for the first time in Giro d'Italia history
^	Point was a new highest elevation reached in all Giro editions up to then

List of highest points reached in the Giro d'Italia
Year	Stage	Climb	Elevation (Note: The elevation points are taken at the passed summit.)	Mountain range	Coordinates	First cyclist to summit	Ref
1965	20	Stelvio Pass	1,958 m (6,424 ft) (Note: The scheduled climb of the Stelvio was to reach 2,757 m (9,045 ft), but due to an avalanche, the final 800 m (2,625 ft) of the climb were not scaled.)	Eastern Alps	46°31′43″N 10°27′10″E	Graziano Battistini (ITA)	
1966	20	Pordoi Pass	2,239 m (7,346 ft)	Dolomites	46°29′04.92″N 11°50′09.96″E	Franco Bitossi (ITA)	
1967	19	Tre Cime di Lavaredo	2,320 m (7,612 ft)	Sexten Dolomites	46°37′07″N 12°18′20″E	Felice Gimondi (ITA)	
1968	12	Tre Cime di Lavaredo	2,320 m (7,612 ft)	Sexten Dolomites	46°37′07″N 12°18′20″E	Eddy Merckx (BEL)	
1969	21	Passo Sella	2,337 m (7,667 ft)	Dolomites	46°30′31″N 11°45′46″E	Claudio Michelotto (ITA)	
1970	20	Pordoi Pass	2,239 m (7,346 ft)	Dolomites	46°29′04.92″N 11°50′09.96″E	Luciano Armani (ITA)	
1971	17	Grossglockner	2,505 m (8,219 ft)	High Tauern	47°04′29.52″N 12°41′42.9″E	Pierfranco Vianelli (ITA)	
1972	17	Stelvio Pass	2,757 m (9,045 ft)	Eastern Alps	46°31′43″N 10°27′10″E	José Manuel Fuente (ESP)	
1973	19	Passo Giau	2,246 m (7,369 ft)	Dolomites	46°28′57″N 12°3′14″E	José Manuel Fuente (ESP)	
1974	20	Tre Cime di Lavaredo	2,400 m (7,874 ft)	Sexten Dolomites	46°37′07″N 12°18′20″E	José Manuel Fuente (ESP)	
1975	21	Stelvio Pass	2,757 m (9,045 ft)	Eastern Alps	46°31′43″N 10°27′10″E	Francisco Galdós (ESP)	
1976	19	Passo Sella	2,214 m (7,264 ft)	Dolomites	46°30′31″N 11°45′46″E	Andrés Gandarias (ESP)	
1977	18	Valparola Pass	2,200 m (7,218 ft)	Dolomites	46.5433°N 11.9736°E	Faustino Fernández Ovies (ITA)	
1978	15	Passo Valles	2,033 m (6,670 ft)	Dolomites	46°20′18.96″N 11°48′2.52″E	Gianbattista Baronchelli (ITA)	
1979	17	Pordoi Pass	2,239 m (7,346 ft)	Dolomites	46°29′04.92″N 11°50′09.96″E	Leonardo Natale (ITA)	
1980	20	Stelvio Pass	2,757 m (9,045 ft)	Eastern Alps	46°31′43″N 10°27′10″E	Jean-René Bernaudeau (FRA)	
1981	20	Tre Cime di Lavaredo	2,400 m (7,874 ft)	Sexten Dolomites	46°37′07″N 12°18′20″E	Beat Breu (SUI)	
1982	21	Col d'Izoard	2,361 m (7,746 ft)	Cottian Alps	44°49′11″N 06°44′06″E	Lucien Van Impe (BEL)	
1983	20	Pordoi Pass	2,239 m (7,346 ft)	Dolomites	46°29′04.92″N 11°50′09.96″E	Marino Lejarreta (ESP)	
1984	20	Pordoi Pass	2,239 m (7,346 ft)	Dolomites	46°29′04.92″N 11°50′09.96″E	Laurent Fignon (FRA)	
1985	19	Passo del Sempione	2,010 m (6,594 ft)	Pennine Alps/Lepontine Alps	46°15′6″N 8°2′0″E	Reynel Montoya (COL)	
1986	21	Pordoi Pass	2,239 m (7,346 ft)	Dolomites	46°29′04.92″N 11°50′09.96″E	Pedro Muñoz Machín Rodríguez (ESP)	
1987	16	Pordoi Pass	2,239 m (7,346 ft)	Dolomites	46°29′04.92″N 11°50′09.96″E	Jean-Claude Bagot (FRA)	
1988	20	~~Stelvio Pass~~	~~2,758 m (9,049 ft)~~	Eastern Alps	46°31′43″N 10°27′10″E	— (Note: The Stelvio Pass was not climbed due to snow drifts that had developed on the roads.)	
1989	16	~~Passo di Gavia~~	~~2,621 m (8,599 ft)~~	Southern Rhaetian Alps	46°20′37″N 10°29′15″E	— (Note: The stage containing the Gavia was cancelled as a whole due to poor weather and snow accumulation on the roads.)	
1990	16	Pordoi Pass	2,239 m (7,346 ft)	Dolomites	46°29′04.92″N 11°50′09.96″E	Maurizio Vandelli (ITA)	
1990	16	Pordoi Pass	2,239 m (7,346 ft)	Dolomites	46°29′04.92″N 11°50′09.96″E	Charly Mottet (FRA)	
1991	17	Pordoi Pass	2,239 m (7,346 ft)	Dolomites	46°29′04.92″N 11°50′09.96″E	Franco Vona (ITA)	
1991	17	Pordoi Pass	2,239 m (7,346 ft)	Dolomites	46°29′04.92″N 11°50′09.96″E	Franco Chioccioli (ITA)	
1992	14	Pordoi Pass	2,239 m (7,346 ft)	Dolomites	46°29′04.92″N 11°50′09.96″E	Claudio Chiappucci (ITA)	
1993	14	Pordoi Pass	2,239 m (7,346 ft)	Dolomites	46°29′04.92″N 11°50′09.96″E	Miguel Induráin (ESP)	
1994	15	Stelvio Pass	2,758 m (9,049 ft)	Eastern Alps	46°31′43″N 10°27′10″E	Franco Vona (ITA)	
1995	19	~~Colle dell'Agnello~~	~~2,744 m (9,003 ft)~~	Cottian Alps	44°41′2″N 06°58′46″E	— (Note: The Colle dell'Agnello was not scaled due to an avalanche that made the roads impassable.)	
1996	21	Passo di Gavia	2,621 m (8,599 ft)	Southern Rhaetian Alps	46°20′37″N 10°29′15″E	Hernán Buenahora (COL)	
1997	19	Pordoi Pass	2,239 m (7,346 ft)	Dolomites	46°29′04.92″N 11°50′09.96″E	José Jaime González (COL)	
1998	17	Passo Sella	2,214 m (7,264 ft)	Dolomites	46°30′31″N 11°45′46″E	Marco Pantani (ITA)	
1999	21	Passo di Gavia	2,621 m (8,599 ft)	Southern Rhaetian Alps	46°20′37″N 10°29′15″E	José Jaime González (COL)	
2000	19	Colle dell'Agnello	2,748 m (9,016 ft)	Cottian Alps	44°41′2″N 06°58′46″E	José Jaime González (COL)	
2001	18	~~Colle Fauniera~~	~~2,511 m (8,238 ft)~~	Cottian Alps	44°23′9″N 7°7′18″E	— (Note: The stage containing the Cima Coppi was cancelled due to protests.)	
2002	16	Pordoi Pass	2,239 m (7,346 ft)	Dolomites	46°29′04.92″N 11°50′09.96″E	Julio Alberto Pérez Cuapio (MEX)	
2003	18	Colle d'Esischie	2,366 m (7,762 ft)	Cottian Alps	44°23′46.8″N 7°7′28.41″E	Fredy González (COL)	
2004	18	Passo di Gavia	2,621 m (8,599 ft)	Southern Rhaetian Alps	46°20′37″N 10°29′15″E	Vladimir Miholjević (CRO)	
2005	14	Stelvio Pass	2,758 m (9,049 ft)	Eastern Alps	46°31′43″N 10°27′10″E	José Rujano (VEN)	
2006	20	Passo di Gavia	2,621 m (8,599 ft)	Southern Rhaetian Alps	46°20′37″N 10°29′15″E	Juan Manuel Gárate (ESP)	
2007	12	Colle dell'Agnello	2,748 m (9,016 ft)	Cottian Alps	44°41′2″N 06°58′46″E	Yoann Le Boulanger (FRA)	
2008	20	Passo di Gavia	2,621 m (8,599 ft)	Southern Rhaetian Alps	46°20′37″N 10°29′15″E	Julio Alberto Pérez Cuapio (MEX)	
2009	10	Sestriere (Note: The original Cima Coppi was to be the Col d'Izoard (2,360 m (7,743 ft)), but snow forced the re-routing of the stage. It was then supposed to be the Blockhaus (2,064 m (6,772 ft)), but due to excessive snow at the top of the climb, the stage was shortened and finished at a lower altitude than first planned.)	2,039 m (6,690 ft)	Cottian Alps	44°57′24.84″N 6°52′45.12″E	Stefano Garzelli (ITA)	
2010	20	Passo di Gavia	2,621 m (8,599 ft)	Southern Rhaetian Alps	46°20′37″N 10°29′15″E	Johann Tschopp (SUI)	
2011	15	Passo Giau	2,236 m (7,336 ft)	Dolomites	46°28′57″N 12°3′14″E	Stefano Garzelli (ITA)	
2012	20	Stelvio Pass	2,758 m (9,049 ft)	Eastern Alps	46°31′43″N 10°27′10″E	Thomas De Gendt (BEL)	
2013	20	Tre Cime di Lavaredo (Note: Stelvio Pass (2,758 m (9,049 ft)) was scheduled to be the Cima Coppi but due to weather the stage was cancelled. With cancellation of the Passo di Stelvio, the climb to Tre Cime di Lavaredo became the Cima Coppi.)	2,320 m (7,612 ft)	Sexten Dolomites	46°37′07″N 12°18′20″E	Vincenzo Nibali (ITA)	
2014	16	Stelvio Pass	2,758 m (9,049 ft)	Eastern Alps	46°31′43″N 10°27′10″E	Dario Cataldo (ITA)	
2015	20	Colle delle Finestre	2,178 m (7,146 ft)	Cottian Alps	45°04′18.49″N 7°03′12.48″E	Mikel Landa (ESP)	
2016	19	Colle dell'Agnello	2,748 m (9,016 ft)	Cottian Alps	44°41′2″N 06°58′46″E	Michele Scarponi (ITA)	
2017	16	Stelvio Pass	2,758 m (9,049 ft)	Eastern Alps	46°31′43″N 10°27′10″E	Mikel Landa (ESP)	
2018	19	Colle delle Finestre	2,178 m (7,146 ft)	Cottian Alps	45°04′18.49″N 7°03′12.48″E	Chris Froome (GBR)	
2019	20	Passo Manghen (Note: The Passo di Gavia (2,618 m (8,589 ft)) was scheduled to be the Cima Coppi, but due to weather the climb was removed from the itinerary. The next highest climb was that to Serrù Lake, however the climb had already been ascended prior to this point. As a result, organisers chose to assign the Cima Coppi to the highest climb out of those which had not been ascended – the Passo Manghen.)	2,047 m (6,716 ft)	Lagorai	46°10′31″N 11°26′21″E	Fausto Masnada (ITA)	
2020	18	Stelvio Pass	2,758 m (9,049 ft)	Eastern Alps	46°31′43″N 10°27′10″E	Rohan Dennis (AUS)	
2021	16	Passo Giau (Note: The Pordoi Pass (2,239 m (7,346 ft)) was scheduled to be the Cima Coppi but due to weather the stage was rerouted and the climb removed. Thus, the climb to Passo Giau became the Cima Coppi.)	2,236 m (7,336 ft)	Dolomites	46°28′57″N 12°3′14″E	Egan Bernal (COL)	
2022	20	Pordoi Pass	2,239 m (7,346 ft)	Dolomites	46°29′04.92″N 11°50′09.96″E	Alessandro Covi (ITA)	
2023	19	Tre Cime di Lavaredo (Note: The Great St Bernard Pass (2,469 m (8,100 ft)) was scheduled to be the Cima Coppi but due to weather the stage was rerouted and the climb removed. Thus, the climb to Tre Cime di Lavaredo became the Cima Coppi.)	2,304 m (7,559 ft)	Sexten Dolomites	46°37′07″N 12°18′20″E	Santiago Buitrago (COL)	
2024	17	Passo Sella (Note: The Stelvio Pass (2,758 m (9,049 ft)) was scheduled to be the Cima Coppi, but due to weather the climb was removed from the itinerary. The next highest climb was that to Livigno (Mottolino), however the climb had already been ascended prior to this point. As a result, organisers chose to assign the Cima Coppi to the highest climb out of those which had not been ascended – the Passo Sella.)	2,239 m (7,346 ft)	Dolomites	46°30′31″N 11°45′46″E	Giulio Pellizzari (ITA)	
2025	20	Colle delle Finestre	2,178 m (7,146 ft)	Cottian Alps	45°04′18.49″N 7°03′12.48″E	Chris Harper (AUS)	
2026	19	Passo Giau	2,246 m (7,369 ft)	Dolomites	46°28′57″N 12°3′14″E	Giulio Ciccone (ITA)	

=== Multiple winners ===
The following riders have won the Cima Coppi on 2 or more occasions.

Multiple winners of the Cima Coppi
Cyclist	Total	Years
José Manuel Fuente (ESP)	3	1972, 1973, 1974
José Jaime González (COL)	3	1997, 1999, 2000
Franco Vona (ITA)	2	1991, 1994
Stefano Garzelli (ITA)	2	2009, 2011
Mikel Landa (ESP)	2	2015, 2017
Julio Alberto Pérez Cuapio (MEX)	2	2002, 2008

=== Winners by nationality ===
Riders from eleven different countries have won the Cima Coppi.

Cima Coppi winners by nationality
Country	No. of wins	No. of winning cyclists
Italy	23	21
Spain	11	8
Colombia	8	6
France	5	5
Belgium	3	3
Switzerland	2	2
Australia	2	2
Mexico	2	1
Venezuela	1	1
Croatia	1	1
United Kingdom	1	1

== See also ==
- Souvenir Henri Desgrange – a similar award given in France's Grand Tour, the Tour de France.
