= Southern Rhaetian Alps =

- Italian: Alpi Retiche meridionali; German: Südliche Rätische Alpen
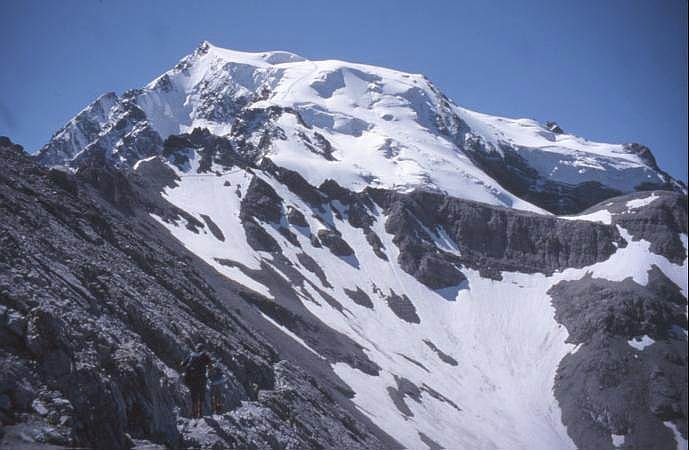
- The Ortler, the highest mountain of the range

Highest point
- Peak: Ortler
- Elevation: 3,905 m (12,812 ft)
- Coordinates: 46°30′32″N 10°32′42″E

Geography
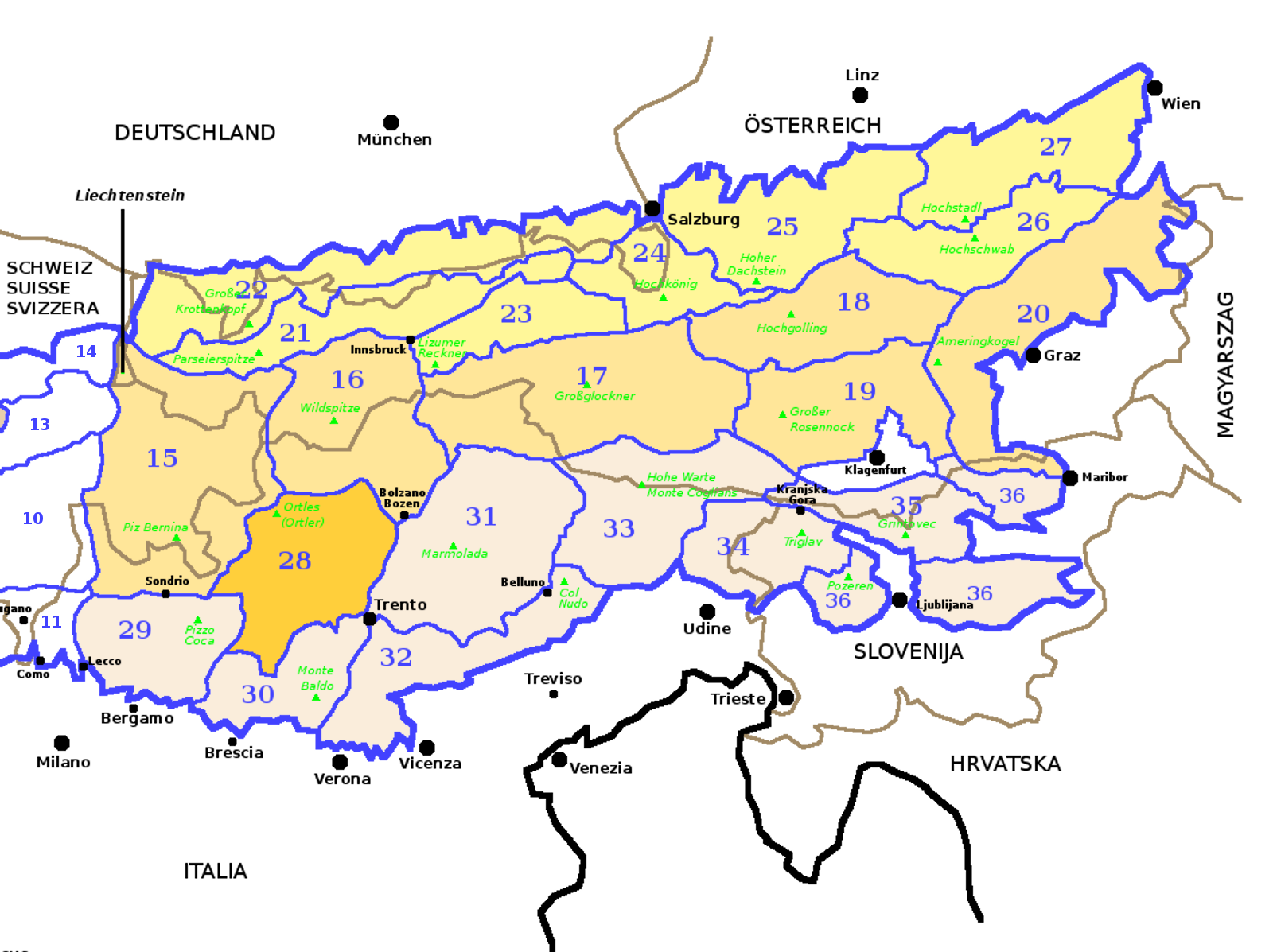
- Southern Rhaetian Alps (section nr.28) within Eastern Alps
- Country: Italy
- Regions: Trentino-Alto Adige and Lombardy
- Parent range: Alps
- Borders on: Western Rhaetian Alps, Eastern Rhaetian Alps, Dolomites, Brescia and Garda Prealps and Bergamasque Alps and Prealps

Geology
- Orogeny: Alpine orogeny

The Southern Rhaetian Alps (Südliche Rätische Alpen in German, Alpi Retiche meridionali in Italian) are a mountain range in the southern part of the Alps.

== Geography ==
Administratively the range belongs to the Italian regions of Trentino-Alto Adige and Lombardy.

=== SOIUSA classification ===
According to SOIUSA (International Standardized Mountain Subdivision of the Alps) the mountain range is an Alpine section, classified in the following way:

- main part = Eastern Alps
- major sector = Southern Limestone Alps
- section =Southern Rhaetian Alps
- code = II/C-28

=== Subdivision ===
The range is subdivided into four subsections:

- Alpi dell'Ortles - SOIUSA code: II/C-28.I,
- Alpi della Val di Non - SOIUSA code: II/C-28.II,
- Alpi dell'Adamello e della Presanella - SOIUSA code: II/C-28.III;
- Dolomiti di Brenta - SOIUSA code: II/C-28.IV.

== Notable summits ==
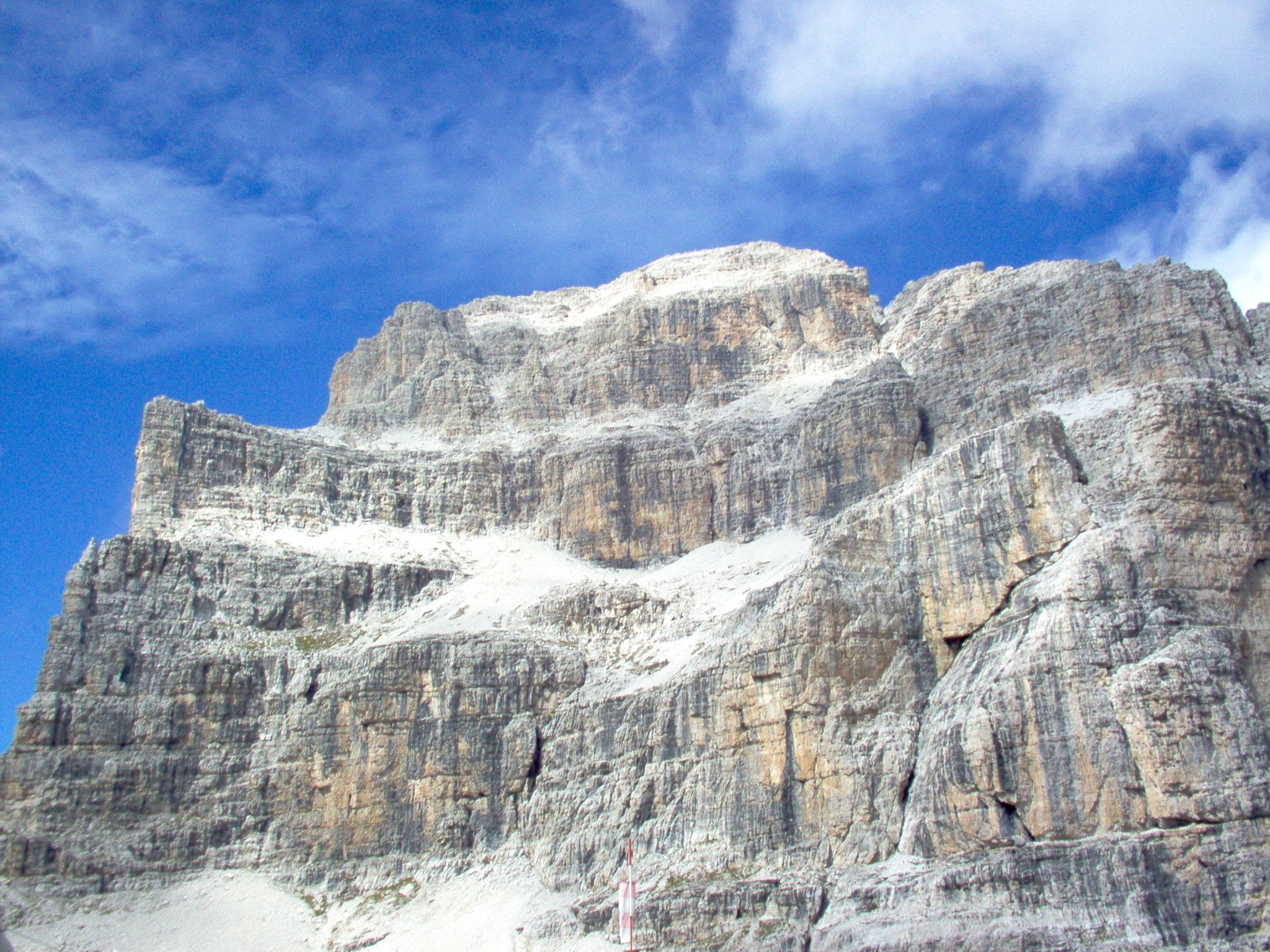
Cima Brenta Alta, Brenta group

Some notable summits of the Southern Rhaetian Alps are:

Name	elevation (m)	subsection
Ortler	3,902	Alpi dell'Ortles
Königspitze	3,851	Alpi dell'Ortles
Monte Cevedale	3,769	Alpi dell'Ortles
Presanella	3,558	Alpi dell'Adamello e della Presanella
Mount Adamello	3,539	Alpi dell'Adamello e della Presanella
Monte Sobretta	3,296	Alpi dell'Ortles
Monte Gavia	3,223	Alpi dell'Ortles
Pizzo Badile Camuno	2,673	Alpi dell'Adamello e della Presanella
Pizzo Badile Camuno	2,435	Alpi dell'Adamello e della Presanella
Monte Ferone	2,409	Alpi dell'Adamello e della Presanella
Paganella	2,125	Dolomiti di Brenta

== Notable passes ==
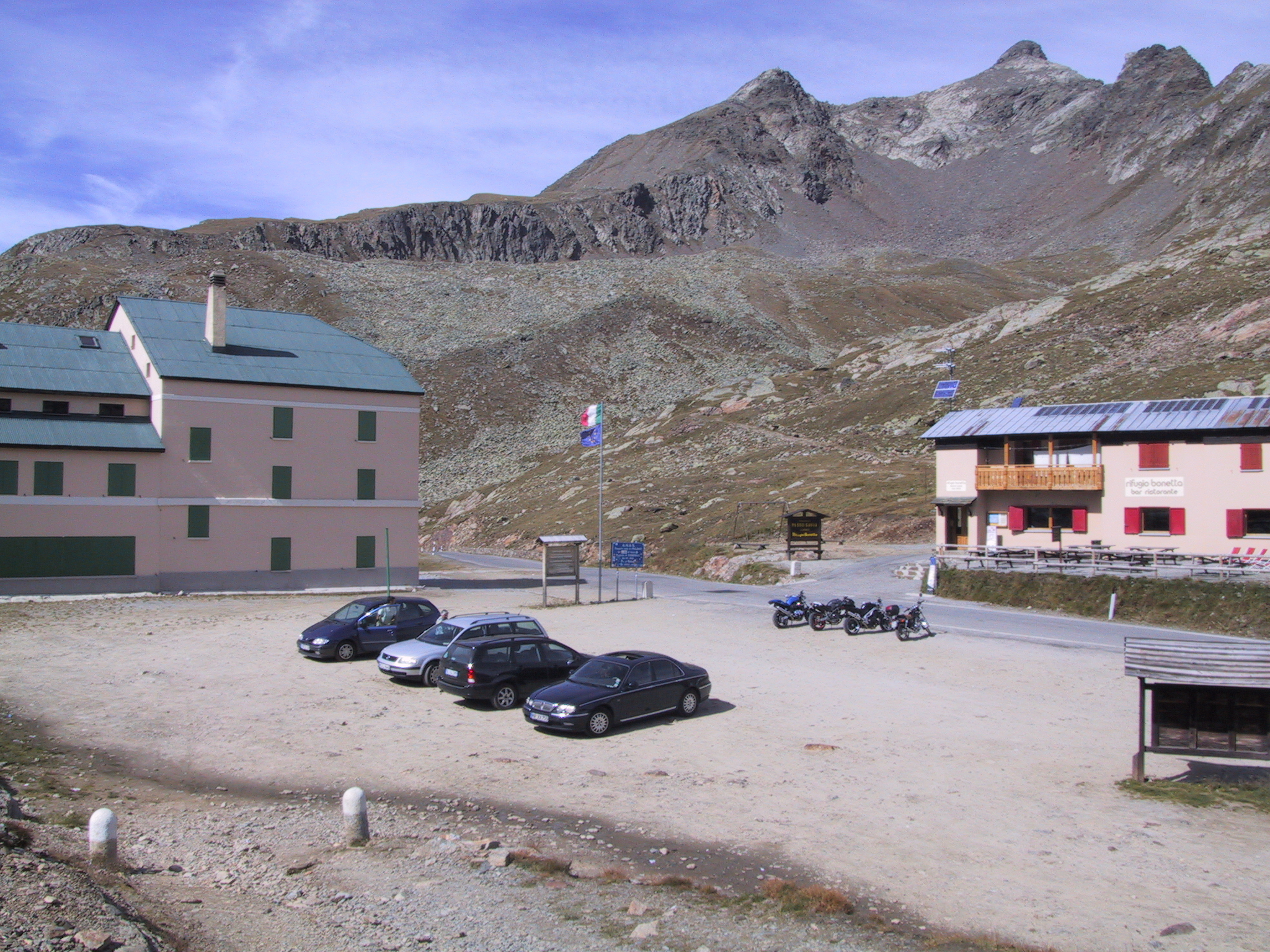
Gavia Pass

Some notable passes of the Southern Rhaetian Alps are:

- Croce Domini Pass
- Gavia Pass
- Mendelpass
- Mortirolo Pass
- Stelvio Pass
- Tonale Pass

== Maps ==
- Italian official cartography (Istituto Geografico Militare - IGM); on-line version: www.pcn.minambiente.it
