= Arnaldo Berni =

Italian soldier (1894–1918)

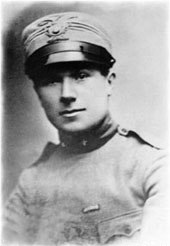
- Born: 2 June 1894
- Died: 3 September 1918 (aged 24) (missing in action)
- Military career
- Allegiance: Kingdom of Italy
- Branch: Royal Italian Army
- Service years: 1915-1918
- Rank: Captain
- Unit: Battalion Alpini Skiers Monte Ortler

Arnaldo Berni (2 June 1894 – 3 September 1918) was a decorated Italian Royal Army soldier.

During World War I, Berni was noted for his mountain warfare skills and accomplishments fighting the Austro-Hungarian Army in the Alps.

== Early life ==
Berni was born in 1894 in Mantua, the son of Professor Archinto, an intellectual in city circles. Berni's mother, Lucia Menozzi, died when he was a young child.

After graduating in accounting, Berni enrolled at the university. In early 1915, just before he could take his graduation exam, the army called him to active duty and sent him to the Officers School of Modena.

In September 16, after completing officer training, Berni was appointed second lieutenant of the Alpini. He was assigned to the Tirano battalion of the 5th Alpini Regiment on the front line.

== World War I ==
The Tirano Battalion specialized in mountain warfare, stationed in the Upper Valtellina and in Trentino.

In 1915, Berni, with the 46th company, took part in the battle for Monte Scorluzzo. In summer 1916, they fought to take Ables pass in Valfurva. Both positions were part of the theater of operations of the Ortles – Cevedale mountain range.

Starting from the Ables position, Berni took part in the conquest of Monte Cristallo, a key strategic position.

Promoted to captain, Berni was valued for his knowledge combat techniques at high altitudes. He served for most of the conflict in charge of putting his driving skills to good use in high mountain clashes.

== Disappearance in battle ==
In September 1918, Berni was assigned to capture Punta San Matteo (3,678 m), the place where the highest-altitude clashes of the conflict took place, including the Battle of San Matteo. Having captured the position, the Italian Army had to turn back a fierce Austro-Hungarian counterattack.

On 3 September 1918 Berni was declared missing in action, his body never found. He was posthumously awarded the silver medal for military valor.

== In memory ==
- The Berni Refuge near Gavia Pass (Valtellina) in Valfurva was named after Berni.
- Berni is memorialized in the Volume Il Capitano burolto nel ice written by Lieutenant Colonel Giuseppe Magrin (Bormio, 2001).
- A small square in Valfurva was dedicated to Berni.
- A public garden in Colle Aperto (Mantua) was dedicated to Berni.

== See also ==
- List of people who disappeared
