= Battle of San Matteo =

Battle in the summer of 1918

Coordinates: 46°22′44″N 10°34′0″E

- Part of the Italian Front (World War I)
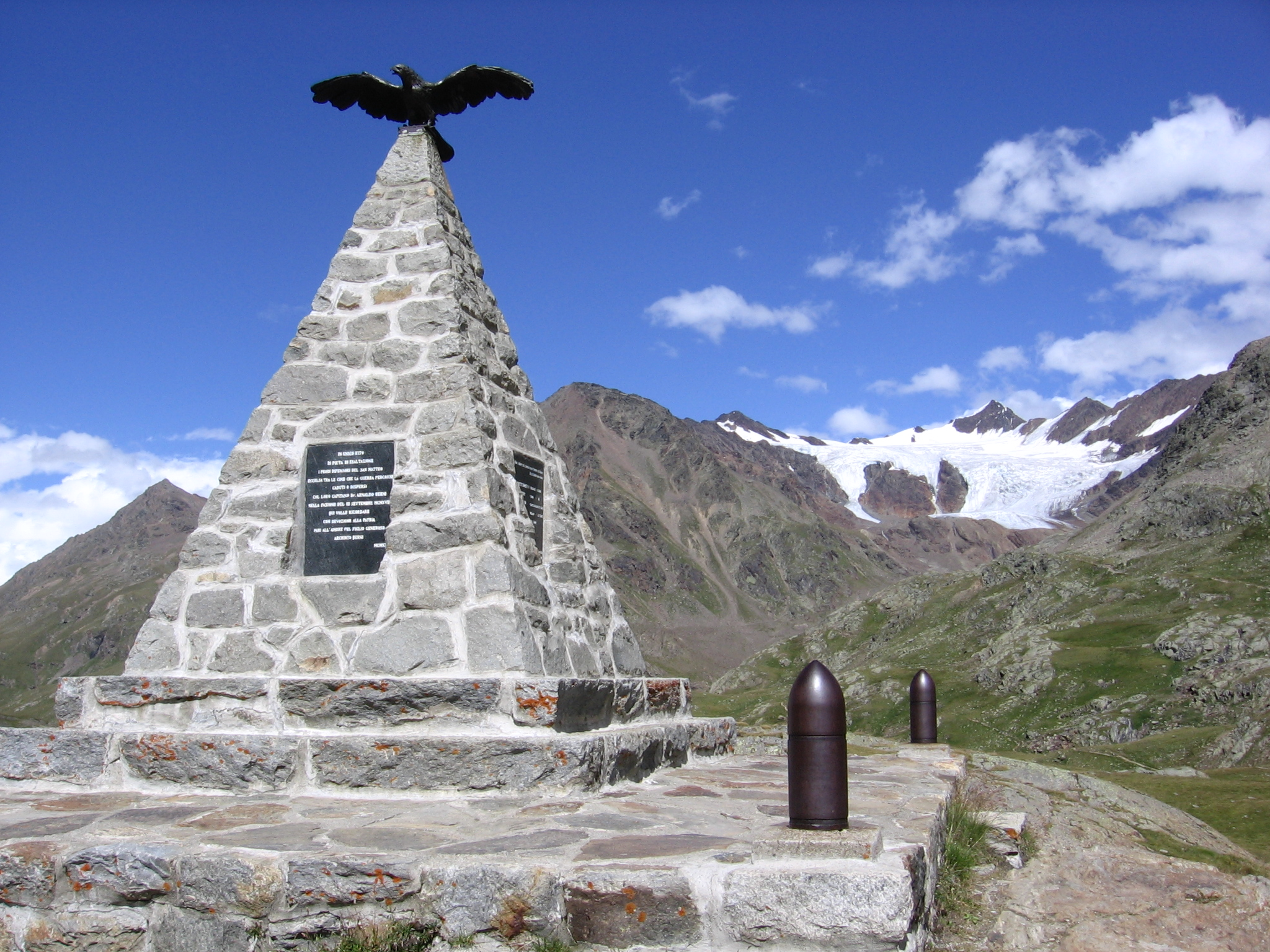
- Italian monument dedicated to the victims of the battle, on the way to the Gavia Pass
Date	13 August – 3 September - 3 November 1918
Location	Punta San Matteo
Result	Italian victory (13 August); Austro-Hungarian victory (3 September); Italian victory (3 November)

Belligerents
Italy	Austria-Hungary

Commanders and leaders
(Kingdom of Italy) Arnaldo Berni †	(Austria-Hungary) Hans Tabarelli de Fatis

Strength
307th and 308th Alpini Companies of the Battalion "Monte Ortler"	150 Kaiserschützen (3rd KuK Kaiserjäger Regiment)

Casualties and losses
(Kingdom of Italy) 10 Italians killed	17 killed

The Battle of San Matteo took place in the late summer of 1918 on the Punta San Matteo (3,678 m) during World War I. It was regarded as the highest battle in history until it was surpassed in 1999 by the Kargil Conflict at 5,600 m.

At the beginning of 1918 Austro-Hungarian troops set up a fortified position with small artillery pieces on the top of the San Matteo Peak. The base of the peak lies at 2800m altitude and it takes a four-hour ice climb up a glacier to reach the top. From this position, they were able to shell the road to the Gavia Pass and thus harass the Italian supply convoys to the front line.

On August 13, 1918, a small group of Alpini mountain troops (308th Company, Battalion "Monte Ortler") conducted a surprise attack on the peak, successfully taking the fortified position. Half of the Austro-Hungarian soldiers were taken prisoner; the other half fled to lower positions.

The loss of the San Matteo Peak constituted a loss of face to imperial Austria, and reinforcements were immediately sent to the region while the Italians were still organizing their defence on the top of the peak.

On September 3, 1918, the Austro-Hungarian forces launched operation "Gemse" ("chamois"), an attack aimed to retake the mountain defended by now by the 307th Alpini Company, Battalion "Monte Ortler". A large scale artillery bombardment, followed by the assault of at least 150 Kaiserschützen of the 3rd KuK Kaiserjäger Regiment stationed in Dimaro, was eventually successful and the lost position was retaken. The Italians, who already considered the mountain lost, began a counter-bombardment of the fortified positions, causing many victims among both the defending Italian and the Austro-Hungarian troops.

The Austro-Hungarians lost 17 men in the battle and the Italians 10. The counterattack was the last Austro-Hungarian victory in World War I.

During the Battle of Vittorio Veneto, the peak of San Matteo was taken for the second and final time by the Alpini on November 3 after an intense artillery preparation. The Armistice of Villa Giusti, concluded on November 3, 1918, at 15:00 at Villa Giusti (near Padua) ended the war in the mountains on November 4, 1918, at 15:00.

In the summer of 2004, the ice-encased bodies of three Kaiserschützen were found at 3400 m, near the peak.

== See also ==
- White War
