= 2004 Giro d'Italia, Stage 11 to Stage 20 =

Cycling race stages

The 2004 Giro d'Italia was the 87th edition of the Giro d'Italia, one of cycling's Grand Tours. The Giro began in Genoa, with a Prologue individual time trial on 8 May, and Stage 11 occurred on 20 May with a stage from Porto Sant'Elpidio. The race finished in Milan on 30 May.

== Stage 11 ==
20 May 2004 — Porto Sant'Elpidio to Cesena, 228 km (142 mi)

Stage 11 result

Rank	Rider	Team	Time
1	Emanuele Sella (ITA)	Ceramica Panaria–Margres	5h 19' 08"
2	Cristian Moreni (ITA)	Alessio–Bianchi	+ 30"
3	Steve Zampieri (SUI)	Vini Caldirola–Nobili Rubinetterie	s.t.
4	Bo Hamburger (DEN)	Acqua & Sapone	s.t.
5	Rubén Lobato (ESP)	Saunier Duval–Prodir	s.t.
6	Juan Manuel Gárate (ESP)	Lampre	s.t.
7	Francisco Vila (ESP)	Lampre	s.t.
8	Alexandre Moos (SUI)	Phonak	+ 49"
9	Damiano Cunego (ITA)	Saeco	s.t.
10	Yaroslav Popovych (UKR)	Landbouwkrediet–Colnago	s.t.

General classification after Stage 11

Rank	Rider	Team	Time
1	Damiano Cunego (ITA)	Saeco	50h 43' 29"
2	Gilberto Simoni (ITA)	Saeco	+ 10"
3	Franco Pellizotti (ITA)	Alessio–Bianchi	+ 28"
4	Yaroslav Popovych (UKR)	Landbouwkrediet–Colnago	+ 40"
5	Giuliano Figueras (ITA)	Ceramica Panaria–Margres	+ 52"
6	Stefano Garzelli (ITA)	Vini Caldirola–Nobili Rubinetterie	+ 1' 15"
7	Andrea Noè (ITA)	Alessio–Bianchi	+ 1' 17"
8	Serhiy Honchar (UKR)	De Nardi	s.t.
9	Dario Cioni (ITA)	Fassa Bortolo	+ 1' 19"
10	Emanuele Sella (ITA)	Ceramica Panaria–Margres	+ 1' 25"

== Stage 12 ==
21 May 2004 — Cesena to Treviso, 210 km (130 mi)

Stage 12 result

Rank	Rider	Team	Time
1	Alessandro Petacchi (ITA)	Fassa Bortolo	4h 48' 12"
2	Robbie McEwen (AUS)	Lotto–Domo	s.t.
3	Alexandre Usov (BLR)	Phonak	s.t.
4	Zoran Klemenčič (SLO)	Tenax	s.t.
5	Olaf Pollack (GER)	Gerolsteiner	s.t.
6	Alberto Loddo (ITA)	Saunier Duval–Prodir	s.t.
7	Crescenzo D'Amore (ITA)	Acqua & Sapone	s.t.
8	Maxim Rudenko (UKR)	Chocolade Jacques–Wincor Nixdorf	s.t.
9	Andris Naudužs (LAT)	De Nardi–Piemme Telekom	s.t.
10	Simone Cadamuro (ITA)	De Nardi	s.t.

General classification after Stage 12

Rank	Rider	Team	Time
1	Damiano Cunego (ITA)	Saeco	55h 31' 41"
2	Gilberto Simoni (ITA)	Saeco	+ 10"
3	Franco Pellizotti (ITA)	Alessio–Bianchi	+ 28"
4	Yaroslav Popovych (UKR)	Landbouwkrediet–Colnago	+ 40"
5	Giuliano Figueras (ITA)	Ceramica Panaria–Margres	+ 52"
6	Stefano Garzelli (ITA)	Vini Caldirola–Nobili Rubinetterie	+ 1' 15"
7	Andrea Noè (ITA)	Alessio–Bianchi	+ 1' 17"
8	Serhiy Honchar (UKR)	De Nardi	s.t.
9	Dario Cioni (ITA)	Fassa Bortolo	+ 1' 19"
10	Emanuele Sella (ITA)	Ceramica Panaria–Margres	+ 1' 25"

== Stage 13 ==
22 May 2004 — Trieste to Trieste, 52 km (32 mi) (ITT)

Stage 13 result

Rank	Rider	Team	Time
1	Serhiy Honchar (UKR)	De Nardi	1h 06' 45"
2	Bradley McGee (AUS)	FDJeux.com	+ 18"
3	Yaroslav Popovych (UKR)	Landbouwkrediet–Colnago	+ 34"
4	Marzio Bruseghin (ITA)	Fassa Bortolo	+ 44"
5	Rubens Bertogliati (SUI)	Saunier Duval–Prodir	+ 1' 32"
6	Rinaldo Nocentini (ITA)	Acqua & Sapone	+ 1' 43"
7	Magnus Bäckstedt (SWE)	Alessio–Bianchi	+ 1' 52"
8	Russell Van Hout (AUS)	Colombia–Selle Italia	+ 2' 14"
9	Franco Pellizotti (ITA)	Alessio–Bianchi	+ 2' 18"
10	Olaf Pollack (GER)	Gerolsteiner	+ 2' 21"

General classification after Stage 13

Rank	Rider	Team	Time
1	Yaroslav Popovych (UKR)	Landbouwkrediet–Colnago	56h 39' 40"
2	Serhiy Honchar (UKR)	De Nardi	+ 3"
3	Bradley McGee (AUS)	FDJeux.com	+ 1' 02"
4	Gilberto Simoni (ITA)	Saeco	+ 1' 27"
5	Franco Pellizotti (ITA)	Alessio–Bianchi	+ 1' 32"
6	Damiano Cunego (ITA)	Saeco	+ 1' 48"
7	Giuliano Figueras (ITA)	Ceramica Panaria–Margres	+ 2' 30"
8	Stefano Garzelli (ITA)	Vini Caldirola–Nobili Rubinetterie	+ 2' 31"
9	Dario Cioni (ITA)	Fassa Bortolo	+ 2' 36"
10	Wladimir Belli (ITA)	Lampre	+ 3' 09"

== Stage 14 ==
23 May 2004 — Trieste to Pula, 175 km (109 mi)

Stage 14 result

Rank	Rider	Team	Time
1	Alessandro Petacchi (ITA)	Fassa Bortolo	4h 08' 58"
2	Fred Rodriguez (USA)	Acqua & Sapone	s.t.
3	Marco Velo (ITA)	Fassa Bortolo	s.t.
4	Olaf Pollack (GER)	Gerolsteiner	s.t.
5	Alexandre Usov (BLR)	Phonak	s.t.
6	Ján Svorada (CZE)	Lampre	s.t.
7	Luciano Pagliarini (BRA)	Lampre	s.t.
8	Angelo Furlan (ITA)	Alessio–Bianchi	s.t.
9	Alejandro Borrajo (ARG)	Ceramica Panaria–Margres	s.t.
10	Philippe Gilbert (BEL)	FDJeux.com	s.t.

General classification after Stage 14

Rank	Rider	Team	Time
1	Yaroslav Popovych (UKR)	Landbouwkrediet–Colnago	60h 48' 38"
2	Serhiy Honchar (UKR)	De Nardi	+ 3"
3	Bradley McGee (AUS)	FDJeux.com	+ 1' 02"
4	Gilberto Simoni (ITA)	Saeco	+ 1' 27"
5	Franco Pellizotti (ITA)	Alessio–Bianchi	+ 1' 32"
6	Damiano Cunego (ITA)	Saeco	+ 1' 48"
7	Giuliano Figueras (ITA)	Ceramica Panaria–Margres	+ 2' 30"
8	Stefano Garzelli (ITA)	Vini Caldirola–Nobili Rubinetterie	+ 2' 31"
9	Dario Cioni (ITA)	Fassa Bortolo	+ 2' 36"
10	Wladimir Belli (ITA)	Lampre	+ 3' 09"

== Stage 15 ==
24 May 2004 — Poreč to San Vendemiano, 243 km (151 mi)

Stage 15 result

Rank	Rider	Team	Time
1	Alessandro Petacchi (ITA)	Fassa Bortolo	5h 59' 52"
2	Robbie McEwen (AUS)	Lotto–Domo	s.t.
3	Olaf Pollack (GER)	Gerolsteiner	s.t.
4	Andris Naudužs (LAT)	De Nardi–Piemme Telekom	s.t.
5	Alexandre Usov (BLR)	Phonak	s.t.
6	Fred Rodriguez (USA)	Acqua & Sapone	s.t.
7	Angelo Furlan (ITA)	Alessio–Bianchi	s.t.
8	Simone Cadamuro (ITA)	De Nardi	s.t.
9	Ján Svorada (CZE)	Lampre	s.t.
10	Luciano Pagliarini (BRA)	Lampre	s.t.

General classification after Stage 15

Rank	Rider	Team	Time
1	Yaroslav Popovych (UKR)	Landbouwkrediet–Colnago	66h 48' 30"
2	Serhiy Honchar (UKR)	De Nardi	+ 3"
3	Bradley McGee (AUS)	FDJeux.com	+ 1' 02"
4	Gilberto Simoni (ITA)	Saeco	+ 1' 27"
5	Franco Pellizotti (ITA)	Alessio–Bianchi	+ 1' 32"
6	Damiano Cunego (ITA)	Saeco	+ 1' 48"
7	Giuliano Figueras (ITA)	Ceramica Panaria–Margres	+ 2' 30"
8	Stefano Garzelli (ITA)	Vini Caldirola–Nobili Rubinetterie	+ 2' 31"
9	Dario Cioni (ITA)	Fassa Bortolo	+ 2' 36"
10	Wladimir Belli (ITA)	Lampre	+ 3' 09"

== Stage 16 ==
25 May 2004 — San Vendemiano to Pfalzen, 217 km (135 mi)

Stage 16 result

Rank	Rider	Team	Time
1	Damiano Cunego (ITA)	Saeco	6h 10' 12"
2	Rinaldo Nocentini (ITA)	Acqua & Sapone	+ 1' 16"
3	Alexandre Moos (SUI)	Phonak	+ 1' 38"
4	Raffaele Illiano (ITA)	Colombia–Selle Italia	s.t.
5	Giuseppe Di Grande (ITA)	Phonak	s.t.
6	Julio Alberto Pérez (MEX)	Ceramica Panaria–Margres	s.t.
7	Christophe Brandt (BEL)	Lotto–Domo	s.t.
8	Luis Laverde (COL)	Formaggi Pinzolo Fiavè	+ 1' 58"
9	Ruggero Marzoli (ITA)	Acqua & Sapone	+ 2' 29"
10	Giuliano Figueras (ITA)	Ceramica Panaria–Margres	s.t.

General classification after Stage 16

Rank	Rider	Team	Time
1	Damiano Cunego (ITA)	Saeco	73h 01' 21"
2	Serhiy Honchar (UKR)	De Nardi	+ 1' 14"
3	Yaroslav Popovych (UKR)	Landbouwkrediet–Colnago	+ 2' 22"
4	Gilberto Simoni (ITA)	Saeco	+ 2' 38"
5	Giuliano Figueras (ITA)	Ceramica Panaria–Margres	+ 3' 31"
6	Bradley McGee (AUS)	FDJeux.com	+ 4' 12"
7	Wladimir Belli (ITA)	Lampre	+ 4' 20"
8	Stefano Garzelli (ITA)	Vini Caldirola–Nobili Rubinetterie	+ 4' 26"
9	Dario Cioni (ITA)	Fassa Bortolo	+ 4' 31"
10	Franco Pellizotti (ITA)	Alessio–Bianchi	+ 5' 31"

== Rest day ==
26 May 2004

== Stage 17 ==
27 May 2004 — Bruneck to Fondo/Sarnonico, 153 km (95 mi)

Stage 17 result

Rank	Rider	Team	Time
1	Pavel Tonkov (RUS)	Vini Caldirola–Nobili Rubinetterie	3h 40' 05"
2	Alessandro Bertolini (ITA)	Alessio–Bianchi	+ 2' 15"
3	Bradley McGee (AUS)	FDJeux.com	+ 2' 49"
4	Damiano Cunego (ITA)	Saeco	s.t.
5	Franco Pellizotti (ITA)	Alessio–Bianchi	s.t.
6	Ruggero Marzoli (ITA)	Acqua & Sapone	s.t.
7	Stefano Garzelli (ITA)	Vini Caldirola–Nobili Rubinetterie	s.t.
8	Yaroslav Popovych (UKR)	Landbouwkrediet–Colnago	s.t.
9	Emanuele Sella (ITA)	Ceramica Panaria–Margres	s.t.
10	Rubén Lobato (ESP)	Saunier Duval–Prodir	s.t.

General classification after Stage 17

Rank	Rider	Team	Time
1	Damiano Cunego (ITA)	Saeco	76h 44' 15"
2	Serhiy Honchar (UKR)	De Nardi	+ 1' 14"
3	Yaroslav Popovych (UKR)	Landbouwkrediet–Colnago	+ 2' 22"
4	Gilberto Simoni (ITA)	Saeco	+ 2' 38"
5	Bradley McGee (AUS)	FDJeux.com	+ 4' 04"
6	Wladimir Belli (ITA)	Lampre	+ 4' 20"
7	Stefano Garzelli (ITA)	Vini Caldirola–Nobili Rubinetterie	+ 4' 26"
8	Dario Cioni (ITA)	Fassa Bortolo	+ 4' 31"
9	Franco Pellizotti (ITA)	Alessio–Bianchi	+ 5' 31"
10	Tadej Valjavec (SLO)	Phonak	+ 5' 31"

== Stage 18 ==
28 May 2004 — Cles to Bormio 2000, 118 km (73 mi)

Stage 18 result

Rank	Rider	Team	Time
1	Damiano Cunego (ITA)	Saeco	3h 56' 31"
2	Dario Cioni (ITA)	Fassa Bortolo	+ 5"
3	Serhiy Honchar (UKR)	De Nardi	s.t.
4	Gilberto Simoni (ITA)	Saeco	+ 9"
5	Julio Alberto Pérez (MEX)	Ceramica Panaria–Margres	+ 17"
6	Eddy Mazzoleni (ITA)	Saeco	+ 35"
7	Juan Manuel Gárate (ESP)	Lampre	s.t.
8	Yaroslav Popovych (UKR)	Landbouwkrediet–Colnago	+ 41"
9	Wladimir Belli (ITA)	Lampre	s.t.
10	Andrea Noè (ITA)	Alessio–Bianchi	+ 43"

General classification after Stage 18

Rank	Rider	Team	Time
1	Damiano Cunego (ITA)	Saeco	80h 40' 26"
2	Serhiy Honchar (UKR)	De Nardi	+ 1' 31"
3	Gilberto Simoni (ITA)	Saeco	+ 3' 07"
4	Yaroslav Popovych (UKR)	Landbouwkrediet–Colnago	+ 3' 23"
5	Dario Cioni (ITA)	Fassa Bortolo	+ 4' 44"
6	Wladimir Belli (ITA)	Lampre	+ 5' 21"
7	Bradley McGee (AUS)	FDJeux.com	+ 5' 24"
8	Stefano Garzelli (ITA)	Vini Caldirola–Nobili Rubinetterie	+ 6' 45"
9	Juan Manuel Gárate (ESP)	Lampre	+ 6' 56"
10	Andrea Noè (ITA)	Alessio–Bianchi	+ 6' 58"

== Stage 19 ==
29 May 2004 — Bormio to Presolana, 122 km (76 mi)

Stage 19 result

Rank	Rider	Team	Time
1	Stefano Garzelli (ITA)	Vini Caldirola–Nobili Rubinetterie	3h 52' 16"
2	Gilberto Simoni (ITA)	Saeco	+ 2"
3	Tadej Valjavec (SLO)	Phonak	+ 23"
4	Dario Cioni (ITA)	Fassa Bortolo	+ 52"
5	Damiano Cunego (ITA)	Saeco	s.t.
6	Eddy Mazzoleni (ITA)	Saeco	+ 1' 23"
7	Pavel Tonkov (RUS)	Vini Caldirola–Nobili Rubinetterie	s.t.
8	Serhiy Honchar (UKR)	De Nardi	s.t.
9	Bradley McGee (AUS)	FDJeux.com	+ 1' 43"
10	Franco Pellizotti (ITA)	Alessio–Bianchi	s.t.

General classification after Stage 19

Rank	Rider	Team	Time
1	Damiano Cunego (ITA)	Saeco	84h 33' 34"
2	Serhiy Honchar (UKR)	De Nardi	+ 2' 02"
3	Gilberto Simoni (ITA)	Saeco	+ 2' 05"
4	Dario Cioni (ITA)	Fassa Bortolo	+ 4' 44"
5	Yaroslav Popovych (UKR)	Landbouwkrediet–Colnago	+ 5' 05"
6	Stefano Garzelli (ITA)	Vini Caldirola–Nobili Rubinetterie	+ 5' 31"
7	Wladimir Belli (ITA)	Lampre	+ 6' 12"
8	Bradley McGee (AUS)	FDJeux.com	+ 6' 15"
9	Tadej Valjavec (SLO)	Phonak	+ 6' 34"
10	Juan Manuel Gárate (ESP)	Lampre	+ 7' 47"

== Stage 20 ==
30 May 2004 — Clusone to Milan, 154 km (96 mi)

Stage 20 result

Rank	Rider	Team	Time
1	Alessandro Petacchi (ITA)	Fassa Bortolo	4h 07' 01"
2	Marco Zanotti (ITA)	Vini Caldirola–Nobili Rubinetterie	s.t.
3	Aart Vierhouten (NED)	Lotto–Domo	s.t.
4	Olaf Pollack (GER)	Gerolsteiner	s.t.
5	Alejandro Borrajo (ARG)	Ceramica Panaria–Margres	s.t.
6	Alexandre Usov (BLR)	Phonak	s.t.
7	Marco Velo (ITA)	Fassa Bortolo	s.t.
8	Simone Cadamuro (ITA)	De Nardi	s.t.
9	Angelo Furlan (ITA)	Alessio–Bianchi	+ 3"
10	Marcus Ljungqvist (SWE)	Alessio–Bianchi	s.t.

General classification after Stage 20

Rank	Rider	Team	Time
1	Damiano Cunego (ITA)	Saeco	88h 40' 43"
2	Serhiy Honchar (UKR)	De Nardi	+ 2' 02"
3	Gilberto Simoni (ITA)	Saeco	+ 2' 05"
4	Dario Cioni (ITA)	Fassa Bortolo	+ 4' 36"
5	Yaroslav Popovych (UKR)	Landbouwkrediet–Colnago	+ 5' 05"
6	Stefano Garzelli (ITA)	Vini Caldirola–Nobili Rubinetterie	+ 5' 31"
7	Wladimir Belli (ITA)	Lampre	+ 6' 12"
8	Bradley McGee (AUS)	FDJeux.com	+ 6' 15"
9	Tadej Valjavec (SLO)	Phonak	+ 6' 34"
10	Juan Manuel Gárate (ESP)	Lampre	+ 7' 47"
