= 2003 Giro d'Italia, Stage 12 to Stage 21 =

Cycling race stages

The 2003 Giro d'Italia was the 86th edition of the Giro d'Italia, one of cycling's Grand Tours. The Giro began in Lecce, with a flat stage on 10 May, and Stage 12 (from San Donà di Piave) on 22 May. The race finished in Milan on 1 June.

== Stage 12 ==
22 May 2003 — San Donà di Piave to Monte Zoncolan, 185 km (115 mi)

Stage 12 result

Rank	Rider	Team	Time
1	Gilberto Simoni (ITA)	Saeco	5h 10' 30"
2	Stefano Garzelli (ITA)	Vini Caldirola–So.di	+ 34"
3	Francesco Casagrande (ITA)	Lampre	+ 39"
4	Yaroslav Popovych (UKR)	Landbouwkrediet–Colnago	+ 42"
5	Marco Pantani (ITA)	Mercatone Uno–Scanavino	+ 43"
6	Julio Alberto Pérez (MEX)	Ceramiche Panaria–Fiordo	+ 1' 05"
7	Andrea Noè (ITA)	Alessio	+ 1' 07"
8	Eddy Mazzoleni (ITA)	Vini Caldirola–So.di	+ 1' 20"
9	Aitor González (ESP)	Fassa Bortolo	+ 1' 30"
10	Kim Kirchen (LUX)	Fassa Bortolo	+ 1' 31"

General classification after Stage 12

Rank	Rider	Team	Time
1	Gilberto Simoni (ITA)	Saeco	57h 20' 18"
2	Stefano Garzelli (ITA)	Vini Caldirola–So.di	+ 44"
3	Andrea Noè (ITA)	Alessio	+ 2' 23"
4	Yaroslav Popovych (UKR)	Landbouwkrediet–Colnago	+ 3' 00"
5	Francesco Casagrande (ITA)	Lampre	+ 4' 14"
6	Raimondas Rumšas (LTU)	Lampre	+ 4' 20"
7	Georg Totschnig (AUT)	Gerolsteiner	+ 4' 42"
8	Franco Pellizotti (ITA)	Alessio	+ 4' 49"
9	Marco Pantani (ITA)	Mercatone Uno–Scanavino	+ 5' 56"
10	Pavel Tonkov (RUS)	CCC–Polsat	+ 6' 37"

== Stage 13 ==
23 May 2003 — Pordenone to Marostica, 149 km (93 mi)

Stage 13 result

Rank	Rider	Team	Time
1	Alessandro Petacchi (ITA)	Fassa Bortolo	3h 38' 58"
2	Daniele Bennati (ITA)	De Nardi–Colpack	s.t.
3	Stefano Garzelli (ITA)	Vini Caldirola–So.di	s.t.
4	Eddy Mazzoleni (ITA)	Vini Caldirola–So.di	s.t.
5	Lorenzo Bernucci (ITA)	Landbouwkrediet–Colnago	s.t.
6	Matteo Carrara (ITA)	De Nardi-Colpack	s.t.
7	Gerhard Trampusch (AUT)	Gerolsteiner	s.t.
8	Paolo Lanfranchi (ITA)	Ceramiche Panaria–Fiordo	s.t.
9	Giovanni Lombardi (ITA)	De Nardi–Colpack	s.t.
10	Yaroslav Popovych (UKR)	Landbouwkrediet–Colnago	s.t.

General classification after Stage 13

Rank	Rider	Team	Time
1	Gilberto Simoni (ITA)	Saeco	60h 59' 16"
2	Stefano Garzelli (ITA)	Vini Caldirola–So.di	+ 36"
3	Andrea Noè (ITA)	Alessio	+ 2' 23"
4	Yaroslav Popovych (UKR)	Landbouwkrediet–Colnago	+ 3' 00"
5	Francesco Casagrande (ITA)	Lampre	+ 4' 14"
6	Raimondas Rumšas (LTU)	Lampre	+ 4' 20"
7	Georg Totschnig (AUT)	Gerolsteiner	+ 4' 42"
8	Franco Pellizotti (ITA)	Alessio	+ 4' 49"
9	Marco Pantani (ITA)	Mercatone Uno–Scanavino	+ 5' 56"
10	Pavel Tonkov (RUS)	CCC–Polsat	+ 6' 37"

== Stage 14 ==
24 May 2003 — Marostica to Alpe di Pampeago, 162 km (101 mi)

Stage 14 result

Rank	Rider	Team	Time
1	Gilberto Simoni (ITA)	Saeco	4h 46' 43"
2	Stefano Garzelli (ITA)	Vini Caldirola–So.di	+ 35"
3	Raimondas Rumšas (LTU)	Lampre	+ 36"
4	Julio Alberto Pérez (MEX)	Ceramiche Panaria–Fiordo	+ 49"
5	Yaroslav Popovych (UKR)	Landbouwkrediet–Colnago	s.t.
6	Andrea Noè (ITA)	Alessio	+ 56"
7	Francesco Casagrande (ITA)	Lampre	+ 59"
8	Eddy Mazzoleni (ITA)	Vini Caldirola–So.di	+ 1' 17"
9	Wladimir Belli (ITA)	Lampre	+ 1' 39"
10	Georg Totschnig (AUT)	Gerolsteiner	+ 1' 43"

General classification after Stage 14

Rank	Rider	Team	Time
1	Gilberto Simoni (ITA)	Saeco	65h 45' 39"
2	Stefano Garzelli (ITA)	Vini Caldirola–So.di	+ 1' 19"
3	Andrea Noè (ITA)	Alessio	+ 3' 39"
4	Yaroslav Popovych (UKR)	Landbouwkrediet–Colnago	+ 4' 09"
5	Raimondas Rumšas (LTU)	Lampre	+ 5' 08"
6	Francesco Casagrande (ITA)	Lampre	+ 5' 33"
7	Georg Totschnig (AUT)	Gerolsteiner	+ 6' 45"
8	Franco Pellizotti (ITA)	Alessio	+ 7' 18"
9	Marco Pantani (ITA)	Mercatone Uno–Scanavino	+ 8' 19"
10	Wladimir Belli (ITA)	Lampre	+ 8' 41"

== Stage 15 ==
25 May 2003 — Merano to Bolzano, 42.5 km (26.4 mi) (ITT)

Stage 15 result

Rank	Rider	Team	Time
1	Aitor González (ESP)	Fassa Bortolo	54' 33"
2	Magnus Bäckstedt (SWE)	Team Fakta	+ 51"
3	Serhiy Honchar (UKR)	De Nardi-Colpack	+ 1' 22"
4	Dario Frigo (ITA)	Fassa Bortolo	+ 1' 23"
5	Bogdan Bondariew (UKR)	CCC–Polsat	+ 1' 30"
6	Yaroslav Popovych (UKR)	Landbouwkrediet–Colnago	+ 1' 36"
7	Gilberto Simoni (ITA)	Saeco	+ 1' 40"
8	Kim Kirchen (LUX)	Fassa Bortolo	+ 1' 41"
9	Sandy Casar (FRA)	FDJeux.com	s.t.
10	Georg Totschnig (AUT)	Gerolsteiner	+ 1' 52"

General classification after Stage 15

Rank	Rider	Team	Time
1	Gilberto Simoni (ITA)	Saeco	66h 41' 52"
2	Stefano Garzelli (ITA)	Vini Caldirola–So.di	+ 1' 58"
3	Yaroslav Popovych (UKR)	Landbouwkrediet–Colnago	+ 4' 05"
4	Andrea Noè (ITA)	Alessio	+ 5' 16"
5	Raimondas Rumšas (LTU)	Lampre	+ 6' 11"
6	Francesco Casagrande (ITA)	Lampre	+ 6' 47"
7	Georg Totschnig (AUT)	Gerolsteiner	+ 6' 57"
8	Serhiy Honchar (UKR)	De Nardi-Colpack	+ 9' 38"
9	Franco Pellizotti (ITA)	Alessio	+ 9' 42"
10	Marco Pantani (ITA)	Mercatone Uno–Scanavino	+ 10' 11"

== Stage 16 ==
26 May 2003 — Arco to Pavia, 207 km (129 mi)

Stage 16 result

Rank	Rider	Team	Time
1	Alessandro Petacchi (ITA)	Fassa Bortolo	4h 39' 34"
2	Jimmy Casper (FRA)	FDJeux.com	s.t.
3	Ján Svorada (CZE)	Lampre	s.t.
4	Daniele Bennati (ITA)	De Nardi–Colpack	s.t.
5	Graziano Gasparre (ITA)	De Nardi-Colpack	s.t.
6	Dario Pieri (ITA)	Saeco	s.t.
7	Andrus Aug (EST)	De Nardi-Colpack	s.t.
8	Angelo Furlan (ITA)	Alessio	s.t.
9	Lars Bak (DEN)	Team Fakta	s.t.
10	Marco Pantani (ITA)	Mercatone Uno–Scanavino	s.t.

General classification after Stage 16

Rank	Rider	Team	Time
1	Gilberto Simoni (ITA)	Saeco	71h 21' 26"
2	Stefano Garzelli (ITA)	Vini Caldirola–So.di	+ 1' 58"
3	Yaroslav Popovych (UKR)	Landbouwkrediet–Colnago	+ 4' 05"
4	Andrea Noè (ITA)	Alessio	+ 5' 16"
5	Raimondas Rumšas (LTU)	Lampre	+ 6' 11"
6	Francesco Casagrande (ITA)	Lampre	+ 6' 47"
7	Georg Totschnig (AUT)	Gerolsteiner	+ 6' 57"
8	Serhiy Honchar (UKR)	De Nardi-Colpack	+ 9' 38"
9	Franco Pellizotti (ITA)	Alessio	+ 9' 42"
10	Marco Pantani (ITA)	Mercatone Uno–Scanavino	+ 10' 11"

== Rest day ==
27 May 2003

== Stage 17 ==
28 May 2003 — Salice Terme to Asti, 117 km (73 mi)

Stage 17 result

Rank	Rider	Team	Time
1	Alessandro Petacchi (ITA)	Fassa Bortolo	2h 39' 47"
2	Ján Svorada (CZE)	Lampre	s.t.
3	Giovanni Lombardi (ITA)	De Nardi–Colpack	s.t.
4	Angelo Furlan (ITA)	Alessio	s.t.
5	Werner Riebenbauer (AUT)	Team Fakta	s.t.
6	Jimmy Casper (FRA)	FDJeux.com	s.t.
7	Raffaele Illiano (ITA)	Colombia–Selle Italia	s.t.
8	Giuseppe Palumbo (ITA)	De Nardi-Colpack	s.t.
9	Robert Förster (GER)	Gerolsteiner	s.t.
10	Andrus Aug (EST)	De Nardi-Colpack	s.t.

General classification after Stage 17

Rank	Rider	Team	Time
1	Gilberto Simoni (ITA)	Saeco	74h 01' 13"
2	Stefano Garzelli (ITA)	Vini Caldirola–So.di	+ 1' 58"
3	Yaroslav Popovych (UKR)	Landbouwkrediet–Colnago	+ 4' 05"
4	Andrea Noè (ITA)	Alessio	+ 5' 16"
5	Raimondas Rumšas (LTU)	Lampre	+ 6' 11"
6	Francesco Casagrande (ITA)	Lampre	+ 6' 47"
7	Georg Totschnig (AUT)	Gerolsteiner	+ 6' 57"
8	Serhiy Honchar (UKR)	De Nardi-Colpack	+ 9' 38"
9	Franco Pellizotti (ITA)	Alessio	+ 9' 42"
10	Marco Pantani (ITA)	Mercatone Uno–Scanavino	+ 10' 11"

== Stage 18 ==
29 May 2003 — Sanuario di Vicoforte to Chianale, 175 km (109 mi)

Stage 18 result

Rank	Rider	Team	Time
1	Dario Frigo (ITA)	Fassa Bortolo	5h 23' 43"
2	Gilberto Simoni (ITA)	Saeco	+ 10"
3	Georg Totschnig (AUT)	Gerolsteiner	+ 2' 38"
4	Yaroslav Popovych (UKR)	Landbouwkrediet–Colnago	+ 3' 12"
5	Raimondas Rumšas (LTU)	Lampre	+ 4' 01"
6	Andrea Noè (ITA)	Alessio	s.t.
7	Franco Pellizotti (ITA)	Alessio	+ 4' 04"
8	Stefano Garzelli (ITA)	Vini Caldirola–So.di	+ 5' 08"
9	Serhiy Honchar (UKR)	De Nardi-Colpack	s.t.
10	Sandy Casar (FRA)	FDJeux.com	s.t.

General classification after Stage 18

Rank	Rider	Team	Time
1	Gilberto Simoni (ITA)	Saeco	79h 24' 54"
2	Stefano Garzelli (ITA)	Vini Caldirola–So.di	+ 7' 08"
3	Yaroslav Popovych (UKR)	Landbouwkrediet–Colnago	+ 7' 19"
4	Andrea Noè (ITA)	Alessio	+ 9' 19"
5	Georg Totschnig (AUT)	Gerolsteiner	+ 9' 29"
6	Raimondas Rumšas (LTU)	Lampre	+ 10' 14"
7	Dario Frigo (ITA)	Fassa Bortolo	+ 12' 27"
8	Franco Pellizotti (ITA)	Alessio	+ 13' 48"
9	Serhiy Honchar (UKR)	De Nardi-Colpack	+ 14' 48"
10	Wladimir Belli (ITA)	Lampre	+ 19' 36"

== Stage 19 ==
30 May 2003 — Canelli to Cascata del Toce, 239 km (149 mi)

Stage 19 result

Rank	Rider	Team	Time
1	Gilberto Simoni (ITA)	Saeco	6h 20' 05"
2	Dario Frigo (ITA)	Fassa Bortolo	+ 3"
3	Eddy Mazzoleni (ITA)	Vini Caldirola–So.di	s.t.
4	Andrea Noè (ITA)	Alessio	+ 10"
5	Franco Pellizotti (ITA)	Alessio	+ 13"
6	Wladimir Belli (ITA)	Lampre	+ 21"
7	Raimondas Rumšas (LTU)	Lampre	+ 27"
8	Yaroslav Popovych (UKR)	Landbouwkrediet–Colnago	s.t.
9	Stefano Garzelli (ITA)	Vini Caldirola–So.di	+ 36"
10	Aitor González (ESP)	Fassa Bortolo	+ 39"

General classification after Stage 19

Rank	Rider	Team	Time
1	Gilberto Simoni (ITA)	Saeco	85h 44' 39"
2	Stefano Garzelli (ITA)	Vini Caldirola–So.di	+ 8' 04"
3	Yaroslav Popovych (UKR)	Landbouwkrediet–Colnago	+ 8' 06"
4	Andrea Noè (ITA)	Alessio	+ 9' 49"
5	Georg Totschnig (AUT)	Gerolsteiner	+ 10' 35"
6	Raimondas Rumšas (LTU)	Lampre	+ 11' 01"
7	Dario Frigo (ITA)	Fassa Bortolo	+ 12' 38"
8	Franco Pellizotti (ITA)	Alessio	+ 14' 21"
9	Serhiy Honchar (UKR)	De Nardi-Colpack	+ 16' 28"
10	Wladimir Belli (ITA)	Lampre	+ 20' 17"

== Stage 20 ==
31 May 2003 — Cannobio to Cantù, 33 km (21 mi)

Stage 20 result

Rank	Rider	Team	Time
1	Giovanni Lombardi (ITA)	De Nardi–Colpack	3h 05' 30"
2	Eddy Mazzoleni (ITA)	Vini Caldirola–So.di	s.t.
3	Giuliano Figueras (ITA)	Ceramiche Panaria–Fiordo	s.t.
4	Marco Velo (ITA)	Fassa Bortolo	s.t.
5	Mario Manzoni (ITA)	Mercatone Uno–Scanavino	+ 4"
6	Paolo Lanfranchi (ITA)	Ceramiche Panaria–Fiordo	s.t.
7	Michele Gobbi (ITA)	De Nardi-Colpack	s.t.
8	Constantino Zaballa (ESP)	Kelme–Costa Blanca	s.t.
9	Fortunato Baliani (ITA)	Formaggi Pinzolo Fiavè	s.t.
10	Vladimir Duma (UKR)	Landbouwkrediet–Colnago	s.t.

General classification after Stage 20

Rank	Rider	Team	Time
1	Gilberto Simoni (ITA)	Saeco	88h 51' 51"
2	Stefano Garzelli (ITA)	Vini Caldirola–So.di	+ 8' 04"
3	Yaroslav Popovych (UKR)	Landbouwkrediet–Colnago	+ 8' 06"
4	Andrea Noè (ITA)	Alessio	+ 9' 49"
5	Georg Totschnig (AUT)	Gerolsteiner	+ 10' 35"
6	Raimondas Rumšas (LTU)	Lampre	+ 11' 01"
7	Dario Frigo (ITA)	Fassa Bortolo	+ 12' 38"
8	Franco Pellizotti (ITA)	Alessio	+ 14' 21"
9	Serhiy Honchar (UKR)	De Nardi-Colpack	+ 16' 28"
10	Eddy Mazzoleni (ITA)	Vini Caldirola–So.di	+ 19' 45"

== Stage 21 ==
1 June 2003 — Milan to Milan, 142 km (88 mi) (ITT)

Stage 21 result

Rank	Rider	Team	Time
1	Serhiy Honchar (UKR)	De Nardi-Colpack	38' 04"
2	Marzio Bruseghin (ITA)	Fassa Bortolo	+ 19"
3	Aitor González (ESP)	Fassa Bortolo	+ 20"
4	Dario Frigo (ITA)	Fassa Bortolo	+ 26"
5	Raimondas Rumšas (LTU)	Lampre	+ 1' 03"
6	Sandy Casar (FRA)	FDJeux.com	+ 1' 05"
7	Stefano Garzelli (ITA)	Vini Caldirola–So.di	+ 1' 16"
8	Leonardo Bertagnolli (ITA)	Saeco	+ 1' 18"
9	Yaroslav Popovych (UKR)	Landbouwkrediet–Colnago	+ 1' 19"
10	Georg Totschnig (AUT)	Gerolsteiner	+ 1' 21"

General classification after Stage 21

Rank	Rider	Team	Time
1	Gilberto Simoni (ITA)	Saeco	89h 32' 09"
2	Stefano Garzelli (ITA)	Vini Caldirola–So.di	+ 7' 06"
3	Yaroslav Popovych (UKR)	Landbouwkrediet–Colnago	+ 7' 11"
4	Andrea Noè (ITA)	Alessio	+ 9' 24"
5	Georg Totschnig (AUT)	Gerolsteiner	+ 9' 42"
6	Raimondas Rumšas (LTU)	Lampre	+ 9' 50"
7	Dario Frigo (ITA)	Fassa Bortolo	+ 10' 50"
8	Serhiy Honchar (UKR)	De Nardi-Colpack	+ 14' 14"
9	Franco Pellizotti (ITA)	Alessio	+ 14' 26"
10	Eddy Mazzoleni (ITA)	Vini Caldirola–So.di	+ 19' 21"
