= Monte Ferone =

Mountain in Italy

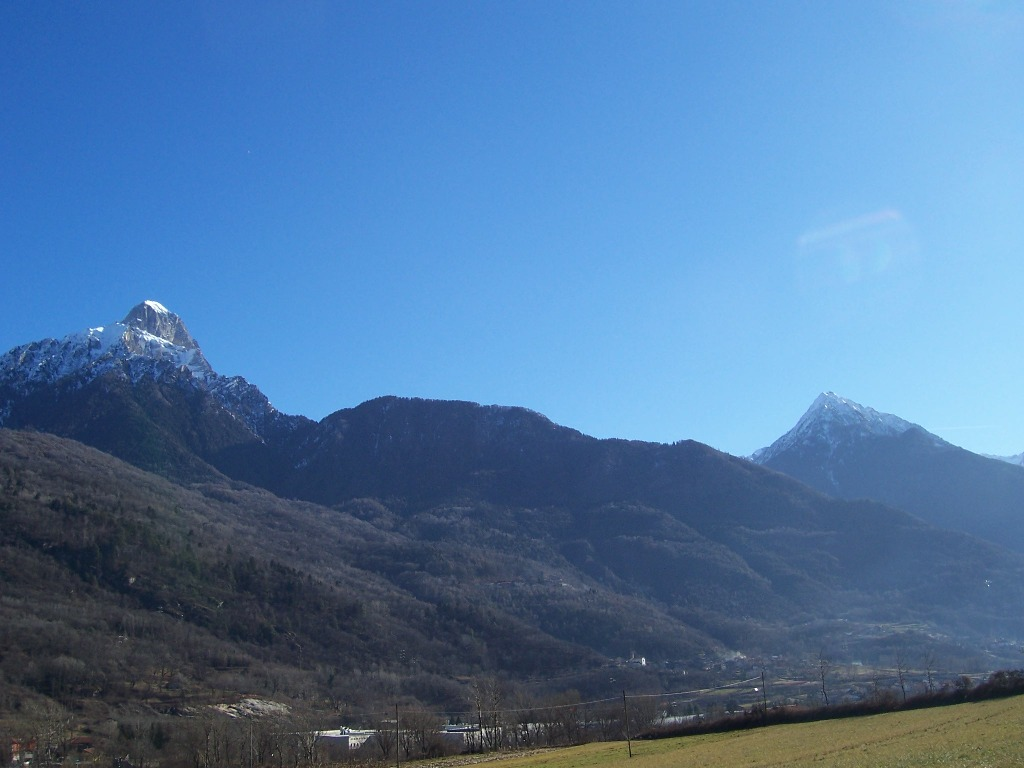

Highest point
- Elevation: 2,409 m (7,904 ft)
- Coordinates: 45°57′44″N 10°23′20″E

Geography
- Location within Italy
- Location: Lombardy, Italy
- Parent range: Alps

Monte Ferone is a mountain of Lombardy, Italy, It has an elevation of 2,409 metres (7,904 ft).

Geologically, it is composed of rock that has bands of marble and marl.
