= 2005 Giro d'Italia, Stage 11 to Stage 20 =

Cycling race stages

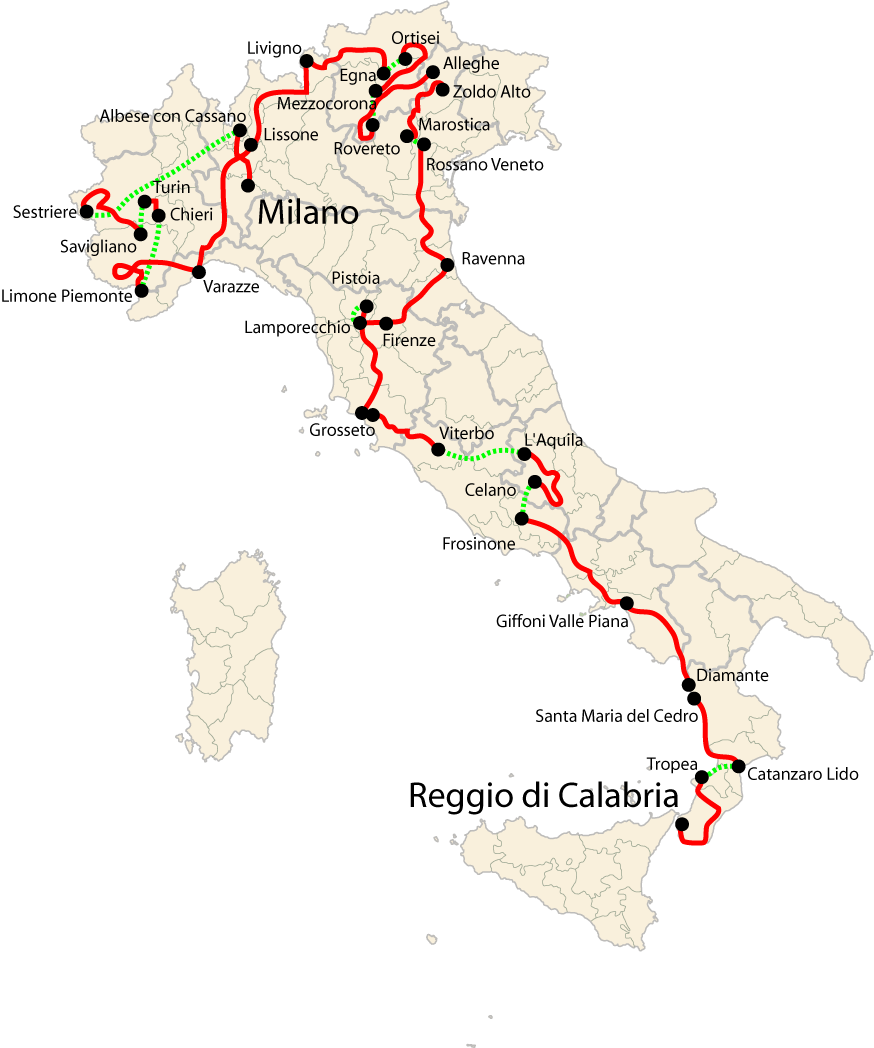
Route of the 2005 Giro d'Italia

The 2005 Giro d'Italia was the 88th edition of the cycle race, one of cycling's Grand Tours. The Giro began in Reggio Calabria with a prologue individual time trial on 7 May, and Stage 11 occurred on 19 May with a mountainous stage from Marostica. The race finished in Milan on 29 May. The winner of the race was Paolo Savoldelli.

== Stage 11 ==
19 May 2005 — Marostica to Zoldo Alto, 150 km (93 mi)

Already one kilometer after the start, Benoît Joachim raced away from the field. After about 100 kilometers, shortly after the first mountain standing which Joachim won, he was captured by the field. Twenty-six kilometers before the end, and following an attack by "Gibo" Simoni, Ivan Basso raced away with only very few riders able to keep up. Only Paolo Savoldelli, who had picked up a twenty seconds advantage on the descent and therefore was able to reserve strengths, could stand Basso's rhythm, and he beat the Varesian rider at the summit of Zoldo Alto. Simoni came up 21 seconds later, but defending champion Damiano Cunego lost around six minutes and was ruled out from the list of contenders.

Stage 11 result

Rank	Rider	Team	Time
1	Paolo Savoldelli (ITA)	Discovery Channel	4h 13' 43"
2	Ivan Basso (ITA)	Team CSC	+ 0"
3	Gilberto Simoni (ITA)	Lampre–Caffita	+ 21"
4	Danilo Di Luca (ITA)	Liquigas–Bianchi	+ 1' 01"
5	Daniel Atienza (ESP)	Cofidis	+ 1' 50"

General Classification after stage 11

Rank	Rider	Team	Time
1	Ivan Basso (ITA)	Team CSC	49h 05' 20"
2	Paolo Savoldelli (ITA)	Discovery Channel	+ 18"
3	Danilo Di Luca (ITA)	Liquigas–Bianchi	+ 1' 04"
4	Gilberto Simoni (ITA)	Lampre–Caffita	+ 2' 27"
5	Serhiy Honchar (UKR)	Domina Vacanze	+ 3' 45"

== Stage 12 ==
20 May 2005 — Alleghe to Rovereto, 178 km (111 mi)

Alessandro Petacchi's efforts during winter, striving to gain ability in the mountains, paid off just as they had done in Milan–San Remo, enabling him to recover from the gruelous Dolomiti stage far better than any of his opponents, and the Italian from Fassa Bortolo sprinted to his second victory in this Giro.

Stage 12 result

Rank	Rider	Team	Time
1	Alessandro Petacchi (ITA)	Fassa Bortolo	4h 50" 00'
2	Paride Grillo (ITA)	Ceramica Panaria–Navigare	+ 0"
3	Isaac Gálvez (ESP)	Illes Balears–Caisse d'Epargne	+ 0"
4	Robert Forster (GER)	Gerolsteiner	+ 0"
5	Jaan Kirsipuu (EST)	Crédit Agricole	+ 0"

General Classification after stage 12

Rank	Rider	Team	Time
1	Ivan Basso (ITA)	Team CSC	53h 55" 20'
2	Paolo Savoldelli (ITA)	Discovery Channel	+ 18"
3	Danilo Di Luca (ITA)	Liquigas–Bianchi	+ 1' 04"
4	Gilberto Simoni (ITA)	Lampre–Caffita	+ 2' 27"
5	Serhiy Honchar (UKR)	Domina Vacanze	+ 3' 45"

== Stage 13 ==
21 May 2005 — Mezzocorona to Urtijëi, 217 km (135 mi)

Colombian Iván Parra won the stage in St. Ulrich by breaking ahead of his fellow breakaways on the previous climb. Spaniard Juanma Gárate, fourth in the 2004 Giro d'Italia, came in second. As for the GC, Ivan Basso, with gastrical problems, lost one minute and the maglia rosa to "Il Falco" Paolo Savoldelli.

Stage 13 result

Rank	Rider	Team	Time
1	Iván Parra (COL)	Colombia–Selle Italia	6h 31' 34"
2	Juan Manuel Gárate (ESP)	Saunier Duval–Prodir	+ 23"
3	José Rujano (VEN)	Colombia–Selle Italia	+ 23"
4	Pietro Caucchioli (ITA)	Crédit Agricole	+ 27"
5	Tadej Valjavec (SLO)	Phonak	+ 1' 46"

General Classification after stage 13

Rank	Rider	Team	Time
1	Paolo Savoldelli (ITA)	Discovery Channel	60h 31' 12"
2	Ivan Basso (ITA)	Team CSC	+ 50"
3	Danilo Di Luca (ITA)	Liquigas–Bianchi	+ 53"
4	Gilberto Simoni (ITA)	Lampre–Caffita	+ 2' 16"
5	Juan Manuel Garate (ESP)	Saunier Duval–Prodir	+ 2' 39"

== Stage 14 ==
22 May 2005 — Neumarkt to Livigno, 210 km (130 mi)

It was in this stage that Ivan Basso's illness was really going to take its toll. Upon the first gradients of the Stelvio Pass, Cima Coppi of this edition, the Team CSC rider was left behind and unable to react because of his health problems. He lost eighteen minutes to the other GC riders. Savoldelli lost time to Simoni and Di Luca, who arrived in Livigno 3' 15" later than Iván Parra, scored an impressive Dolomiti double.

Stage 14 result

Rank	Rider	Team	Time
1	Iván Parra (COL)	Colombia–Selle Italia	6h 46' 33"
2	Tadej Valjavec (SLO)	Phonak	+ 1' 50"
3	José Rujano (VEN)	Colombia–Selle Italia	+ 1' 50"
4	Unai Osa Eizaguirre (ESP)	Illes Balears–Caisse d'Epargne	+ 2' 51"
5	Danilo Di Luca (ITA)	Liquigas–Bianchi	+ 3' 15"

General Classification after stage 14

Rank	Rider	Team	Time
1	Paolo Savoldelli (ITA)	Discovery Channel	67h 21' 28"
2	Danilo Di Luca (ITA)	Liquigas–Bianchi	+ 25"
3	Gilberto Simoni (ITA)	Lampre–Caffita	+ 1' 48"
4	Juan Manuel Garate (ESP)	Saunier Duval–Prodir	+ 2' 11"
5	José Rujano (VEN)	Colombia–Selle Italia	+ 2' 18"

== Stage 15 ==
23 May 2005 — Villa di Tirano to Lissone, 207 km (129 mi)

This stage, originally 205 kilometres long, was reduced to a length of 147 kilometres due to bad weather conditions at Forcola di Livigno, one of the mountain climbs that the peloton had to go through that day. Alessandro Petacchi, after the abandon of sprinters such as Baden Cooke, Robbie McEwen, Stuart O'Grady or Jaan Kirsipuu, had only Erik Zabel to challenge him, but the Italian's speed was too much for the veteran T-Mobile rider.

Stage 15 result

Rank	Rider	Team	Time
1	Alessandro Petacchi (ITA)	Fassa Bortolo	3h 32' 41"
2	Erik Zabel (GER)	T-Mobile Team	+ 0"
3	Paolo Bettini (ITA)	Quick-Step–Innergetic	+ 0"
4	Simone Cadamuro (ITA)	Domina Vacanze	+ 0"
5	Marco Velo (ITA)	Fassa Bortolo	+ 0"

General Classification after stage 15

Rank	Rider	Team	Time
1	Paolo Savoldelli (ITA)	Discovery Channel	70h 54' 09"
2	Danilo Di Luca (ITA)	Liquigas–Bianchi	+ 25"
3	Gilberto Simoni (ITA)	Lampre–Caffita	+ 1' 48"
4	Juan Manuel Garate (ESP)	Saunier Duval–Prodir	+ 2' 11"
5	José Rujano (VEN)	Colombia–Selle Italia	+ 2' 18"

== Stage 16 ==
25 May 2005 — Lissone to Varazze, 210 km (130 mi)

After the second rest-day, the peloton did not want to spend too much energies on a flat stage, so it was easy for a break-away of eighteen men to gather an advantage of 10 minutes. Amongst these breakaways, there was Crédit Agricole rider Christophe Le Mével, who outpowered his fellow breakaways to notch up his first pro victory.

Stage 16 result

Rank	Rider	Team	Time
1	Christophe Le Mével (FRA)	Crédit Agricole	4h 50' 51"
2	Christophe Brandt (BEL)	Davitamon–Lotto	+ 9"
3	Alessandro Vanotti (ITA)	Domina Vacanze	+ 16"
4	Dimitri Fofonov (KAZ)	Cofidis	+ 16"
5	Fränk Schleck (LUX)	Team CSC	+ 16"

General Classification after stage 16

Rank	Rider	Team	Time
1	Paolo Savoldelli (ITA)	Discovery Channel	76h 07' 16"
2	Danilo Di Luca (ITA)	Liquigas–Bianchi	+ 25"
3	Gilberto Simoni (ITA)	Lampre–Caffita	+ 1' 48"
4	Juan Manuel Garate (ESP)	Saunier Duval–Prodir	+ 2' 11"
5	José Rujano (VEN)	Colombia–Selle Italia	+ 2' 18"

== Stage 17 ==
26 May 2005 — Varazze to Limone Piemonte, 194 km (121 mi)

Stage 17 result

Rank	Rider	Team	Time
1	Ivan Basso (ITA)	Team CSC	5h 15' 46"
2	José Rujano (VEN)	Colombia–Selle Italia	+ 1' 06"
3	Gilberto Simoni (ITA)	Lampre–Caffita	+ 1' 06"
4	Wim Van Huffel (BEL)	Davitamon–Lotto	+ 1' 32"
5	Iván Parra (COL)	Colombia–Selle Italia	+ 1' 48"

General Classification after stage 17

Rank	Rider	Team	Time
1	Paolo Savoldelli (ITA)	Discovery Channel	81h 24' 50"
2	Gilberto Simoni (ITA)	Lampre–Caffita	+ 58"
3	José Rujano (VEN)	Colombia–Selle Italia	+ 1' 24"
4	Danilo Di Luca (ITA)	Liquigas–Bianchi	+ 1' 36"
5	Juan Manuel Garate (ESP)	Saunier Duval–Prodir	+ 2' 11"

== Stage 18 ==
27 May 2005 — Chieri to Turin, 31 km (19 mi) (ITT)

Stage 18 result

Rank	Rider	Team	Time
1	Ivan Basso (ITA)	Team CSC	45' 05"
2	Vladimir Karpets (RUS)	Illes Balears–Caisse d'Epargne	+ 9"
3	David Zabriskie (USA)	Team CSC	+ 20"
4	Paolo Savoldelli (ITA)	Discovery Channel	+ 23"
5	Dario Cioni (ITA)	Liquigas–Bianchi	+ 28"

General Classification after stage 18

Rank	Rider	Team	Time
1	Paolo Savoldelli (ITA)	Discovery Channel	82h 10' 18"
2	Gilberto Simoni (ITA)	Lampre–Caffita	+ 2' 09"
3	José Rujano (VEN)	Colombia–Selle Italia	+ 3' 00"
4	Danilo Di Luca (ITA)	Liquigas–Bianchi	+ 3' 08"
5	Juan Manuel Garate (ESP)	Saunier Duval–Prodir	+ 3' 13"

== Stage 19 ==
28 May 2005 — Savigliano to Sestriere, 190 km (120 mi)

Stage 19 result

Rank	Rider	Team	Time
1	José Rujano (VEN)	Colombia–Selle Italia	5h 49' 30"
2	Gilberto Simoni (ITA)	Lampre–Caffita	+ 26"
3	Danilo Di Luca (ITA)	Liquigas–Bianchi	+ 1' 37"
4	Juan Manuel Garate (ESP)	Saunier Duval–Prodir	+ 1' 53"
5	Wim Van Huffel (BEL)	Davitamon–Lotto	+ 1' 55"

General Classification after stage 19

Rank	Rider	Team	Time
1	Paolo Savoldelli (ITA)	Discovery Channel	88h 01' 43"
2	Gilberto Simoni (ITA)	Lampre–Caffita	+ 28"
3	José Rujano (VEN)	Colombia–Selle Italia	+ 45"
4	Danilo Di Luca (ITA)	Liquigas–Bianchi	+ 2' 42"
5	Juan Manuel Garate (ESP)	Saunier Duval–Prodir	+ 3' 11"

== Stage 20 ==
29 May 2005 — Albese con Cassano to Milan, 121 km (75 mi)

Stage 20 result

Rank	Rider	Team	Time
1	Alessandro Petacchi (ITA)	Fassa Bortolo	3h 24' 08"
2	Erik Zabel (GER)	T-Mobile Team	+ 0"
3	Robert Forster (GER)	Gerolsteiner	+ 0"
4	Mirco Lorenzetto (ITA)	Domina Vacanze	+ 0"
5	Marco Velo (ITA)	Domina Vacanze	+ 0"

General Classification after stage 20

Rank	Rider	Team	Time
1	Paolo Savoldelli (ITA)	Discovery Channel	91h 25' 51"
2	Gilberto Simoni (ITA)	Lampre–Caffita	+ 28"
3	José Rujano (VEN)	Colombia–Selle Italia	+ 45"
4	Danilo Di Luca (ITA)	Liquigas–Bianchi	+ 2' 42"
5	Juan Manuel Garate (ESP)	Saunier Duval–Prodir	+ 3' 11"
