= Pizzo Badile Camuno =

Mountain in Italy

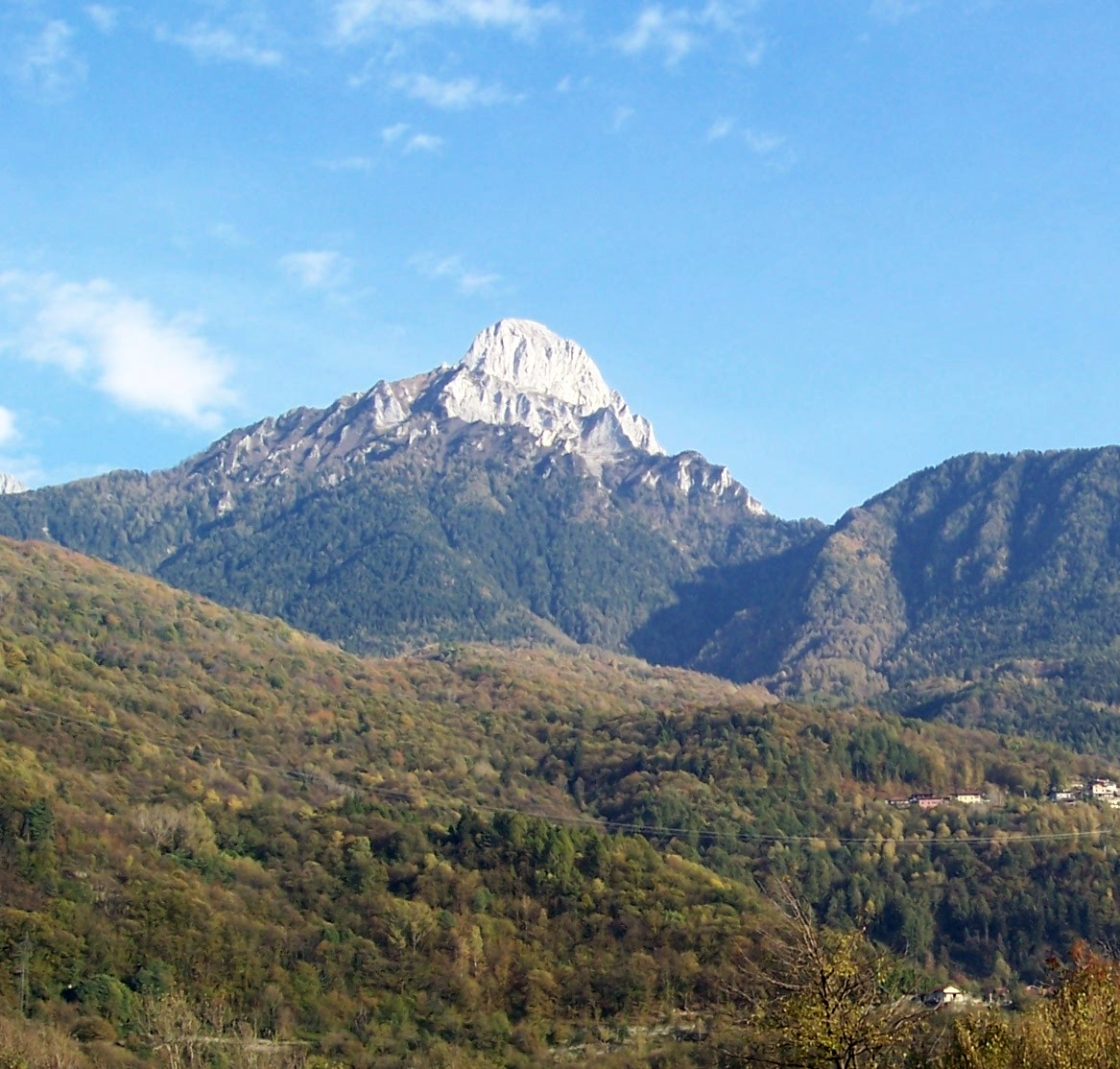

Highest point
- Elevation: 2,435 m (7,989 ft)
- Coordinates: 46°00′17″N 10°24′07″E

Geography
- Location within Italy
- Location: Lombardy, Italy

Pizzo Badile Camuno is a mountain of Lombardy, Italy. It has an elevation of 2,435 metres (7,989 ft).
