= 1992 Giro d'Italia, Stage 12 to Stage 22 =

Cycling race stages

The 1992 Giro d'Italia was the 75th edition of the Giro d'Italia, one of cycling's Grand Tours. The Giro began in Genoa, with an individual time trial on 24 May, and Stage 12 occurred on 4 June with a stage from Imola. The race finished in Milan on 14 June.

== Stage 12 ==
4 June 1992 — Imola to Bassano del Grappa, 214 km (133 mi)

Stage 12 result

Rank	Rider	Team	Time
1	Endrio Leoni (ITA)	Jolly Componibili–Club 88	5h 04' 10"
2	Mario Cipollini (ITA)	GB–MG Maglificio	s.t.
3	Adriano Baffi (ITA)	Ariostea	s.t.
4	François Simon (FRA)	Castorama	s.t.
5	Max Sciandri (ITA)	Motorola	s.t.
6	Zbigniew Spruch (POL)	Lampre–Colnago	s.t.
7	Alessio Di Basco (ITA)	Amore & Vita–Fanini	s.t.
8	Christian Henn (GER)	Team Telekom	s.t.
9	Giuseppe Petito (ITA)	Mercatone Uno–Medeghini–Zucchini	s.t.
10	Piotr Ugrumov (LAT)	Seur	s.t.

General classification after Stage 12

Rank	Rider	Team	Time
1	Miguel Induráin (ESP)	Banesto	54h 17' 00"
2	Roberto Conti (ITA)	Ariostea	+ 59"
3	Luis Herrera (COL)	Postobón–Manzana–Ryalcao	+ 2' 16"
4	Claudio Chiappucci (ITA)	Carrera Jeans–Vagabond	s.t.
5	Marco Giovannetti (ITA)	Gatorade–Chateau d'Ax	+ 2' 20"
6	Andrew Hampsten (USA)	Motorola	+ 2' 42"
7	Zenon Jaskuła (POL)	GB–MG Maglificio	+ 2' 58"
8	Franco Vona (ITA)	GB–MG Maglificio	+ 2' 59"
9	Franco Chioccioli (ITA)	GB–MG Maglificio	+ 3' 26"
10	Gianni Faresin (ITA)	ZG Mobili–Selle Italia	+ 4' 01"

== Stage 13 ==
5 June 1992 — Bassano del Grappa to Corvara, 204 km (127 mi)

Stage 13 result

Rank	Rider	Team	Time
1	Franco Vona (ITA)	GB–MG Maglificio	6h 29' 04"
2	Miguel Induráin (ESP)	Banesto	+ 3"
3	Claudio Chiappucci (ITA)	Carrera Jeans–Vagabond	s.t.
4	Marco Giovannetti (ITA)	Gatorade–Chateau d'Ax	s.t.
5	Franco Chioccioli (ITA)	GB–MG Maglificio	+ 12"
6	Bruno Cornillet (FRA)	Z	s.t.
7	Flavio Giupponi (ITA)	Mercatone Uno–Medeghini–Zucchini	s.t.
8	Massimiliano Lelli (ITA)	Ariostea	+ 17"
9	Andrew Hampsten (USA)	Motorola	+ 37"
10	Leonardo Sierra (VEN)	ZG Mobili–Selle Italia	+ 52"

General classification after Stage 13

Rank	Rider	Team	Time
1	Miguel Induráin (ESP)	Banesto	60h 45' 59"
2	Roberto Conti (ITA)	Ariostea	+ 1' 59"
3	Claudio Chiappucci (ITA)	Carrera Jeans–Vagabond	+ 2' 20"
4	Marco Giovannetti (ITA)	Gatorade–Chateau d'Ax	+ 2' 28"
5	Franco Vona (ITA)	GB–MG Maglificio	+ 2' 52"
6	Andrew Hampsten (USA)	Motorola	+ 3' 24"
7	Luis Herrera (COL)	Postobón–Manzana–Ryalcao	+ 3' 38"
8	Franco Chioccioli (ITA)	GB–MG Maglificio	+ 3' 43"
9	Massimiliano Lelli (ITA)	Ariostea	+ 5' 52"
10	Leonardo Sierra (VEN)	ZG Mobili–Selle Italia	+ 5' 59"

== Stage 14 ==
6 June 1992 — Corvara to Monte Bondone, 205 km (127 mi)

Stage 14 result

Rank	Rider	Team	Time
1	Giorgio Furlan (ITA)	Ariostea	6h 26' 33"
2	Franco Chioccioli (ITA)	GB–MG Maglificio	+ 4' 19"
3	Claudio Chiappucci (ITA)	Carrera Jeans–Vagabond	+ 4' 25"
4	Marco Giovannetti (ITA)	Gatorade–Chateau d'Ax	s.t.
5	Miguel Induráin (ESP)	Banesto	s.t.
6	Flavio Giupponi (ITA)	Mercatone Uno–Medeghini–Zucchini	s.t.
7	Roberto Conti (ITA)	Ariostea	s.t.
8	Andrew Hampsten (USA)	Motorola	s.t.
9	Franco Vona (ITA)	GB–MG Maglificio	+ 4' 37"
10	Pavel Tonkov (RUS)	Lampre–Colnago	+ 4' 49"

General classification after Stage 14

Rank	Rider	Team	Time
1	Miguel Induráin (ESP)	Banesto	67h 16' 55"
2	Roberto Conti (ITA)	Ariostea	+ 2' 01"
3	Claudio Chiappucci (ITA)	Carrera Jeans–Vagabond	+ 2' 14"
4	Marco Giovannetti (ITA)	Gatorade–Chateau d'Ax	+ 2' 30"
5	Franco Vona (ITA)	GB–MG Maglificio	+ 3' 06"
6	Andrew Hampsten (USA)	Motorola	+ 3' 26"
7	Franco Chioccioli (ITA)	GB–MG Maglificio	+ 3' 31"
8	Luis Herrera (COL)	Postobón–Manzana–Ryalcao	+ 5' 23"
9	Flavio Giupponi (ITA)	Mercatone Uno–Medeghini–Zucchini	+ 6' 17"
10	Leonardo Sierra (VEN)	ZG Mobili–Selle Italia	+ 8' 59"

== Stage 15 ==
7 June 1992 — Riva del Garda to Palazzolo sull'Oglio, 171 km (106 mi)

Stage 15 result

Rank	Rider	Team	Time
1	François Simon (FRA)	Castorama	4h 10' 41"
2	Bruno Leali (ITA)	Mercatone Uno–Medeghini–Zucchini	s.t.
3	Massimo Ghirotto (ITA)	Carrera Jeans–Vagabond	s.t.
4	Neil Stephens (AUS)	ONCE	s.t.
5	Christian Henn (GER)	Team Telekom	s.t.
6	Max Sciandri (ITA)	Motorola	+ 27"
7	Guido Bontempi (ITA)	Carrera Jeans–Vagabond	+ 29"
8	Fabrizio Settembrini (ITA)	Italbonifica–Navigare	+ 1' 26"
9	Giovanni Fidanza (ITA)	Gatorade–Chateau d'Ax	s.t.
10	Ján Svorada (CSK)	Lampre–Colnago	+ 4' 28"

General classification after Stage 15

Rank	Rider	Team	Time
1	Miguel Induráin (ESP)	Banesto	71h 34' 40"
2	Roberto Conti (ITA)	Ariostea	+ 2' 01"
3	Claudio Chiappucci (ITA)	Carrera Jeans–Vagabond	+ 2' 14"
4	Marco Giovannetti (ITA)	Gatorade–Chateau d'Ax	+ 2' 30"
5	Franco Vona (ITA)	GB–MG Maglificio	+ 3' 06"
6	Andrew Hampsten (USA)	Motorola	+ 3' 26"
7	Franco Chioccioli (ITA)	GB–MG Maglificio	+ 3' 31"
8	Luis Herrera (COL)	Postobón–Manzana–Ryalcao	+ 5' 23"
9	Flavio Giupponi (ITA)	Mercatone Uno–Medeghini–Zucchini	+ 6' 17"
10	Leonardo Sierra (VEN)	ZG Mobili–Selle Italia	+ 8' 49"

== Stage 16 ==
8 June 1992 — Palazzolo sull'Oglio to Sondrio, 166 km (103 mi)

Stage 16 result

Rank	Rider	Team	Time
1	Marco Saligari (ITA)	Ariostea	4h 07' 13"
2	Gérard Rué (FRA)	Castorama	+ 52"
3	Franco Chioccioli (ITA)	GB–MG Maglificio	+ 53"
4	Miguel Induráin (ESP)	Banesto	s.t.
5	Andrew Hampsten (USA)	Motorola	s.t.
6	Claudio Chiappucci (ITA)	Carrera Jeans–Vagabond	s.t.
7	Franco Vona (ITA)	GB–MG Maglificio	s.t.
8	Massimo Ghirotto (ITA)	Carrera Jeans–Vagabond	+ 1' 33"
9	Juan Tomás Martínez (ESP)	Lotus–Festina	s.t.
10	Pavel Tonkov (RUS)	Lampre–Colnago	s.t.

General classification after Stage 16

Rank	Rider	Team	Time
1	Miguel Induráin (ESP)	Banesto	75h 42' 48"
2	Claudio Chiappucci (ITA)	Carrera Jeans–Vagabond	+ 2' 14"
3	Roberto Conti (ITA)	Ariostea	+ 3' 07"
4	Franco Vona (ITA)	GB–MG Maglificio	+ 3' 10"
5	Andrew Hampsten (USA)	Motorola	+ 3' 26"
6	Franco Chioccioli (ITA)	GB–MG Maglificio	+ 3' 27"
7	Marco Giovannetti (ITA)	Gatorade–Chateau d'Ax	+ 4' 10"
8	Luis Herrera (COL)	Postobón–Manzana–Ryalcao	+ 6' 29"
9	Flavio Giupponi (ITA)	Mercatone Uno–Medeghini–Zucchini	+ 7' 23"
10	Leonardo Sierra (VEN)	ZG Mobili–Selle Italia	+ 9' 29"

== Stage 17 ==
9 June 1992 — Sondrio to Vercelli, 203 km (126 mi)

Stage 17 result

Rank	Rider	Team	Time
1	Mario Cipollini (ITA)	GB–MG Maglificio	5h 15' 36"
2	Adriano Baffi (ITA)	Ariostea	s.t.
3	Giovanni Fidanza (ITA)	Gatorade–Chateau d'Ax	s.t.
4	Silvio Martinello (ITA)	Mercatone Uno–Medeghini–Zucchini	s.t.
5	Giovanni Strazzer (ITA)	ZG Mobili–Selle Italia	s.t.
6	Ján Svorada (CSK)	Lampre–Colnago	s.t.
7	Massimo Strazzer (ITA)	Jolly Componibili–Club 88	s.t.
8	Raimondo Vairetti (ITA)	Italbonifica–Navigare	s.t.
9	Steve Bauer (CAN)	Motorola	s.t.
10	Zbigniew Spruch (POL)	Lampre–Colnago	s.t.

General classification after Stage 17

Rank	Rider	Team	Time
1	Miguel Induráin (ESP)	Banesto	80h 58' 24"
2	Claudio Chiappucci (ITA)	Carrera Jeans–Vagabond	+ 2' 14"
3	Roberto Conti (ITA)	Ariostea	+ 3' 07"
4	Franco Vona (ITA)	GB–MG Maglificio	+ 3' 10"
5	Andrew Hampsten (USA)	Motorola	+ 3' 26"
6	Franco Chioccioli (ITA)	GB–MG Maglificio	+ 3' 27"
7	Marco Giovannetti (ITA)	Gatorade–Chateau d'Ax	+ 4' 10"
8	Luis Herrera (COL)	Postobón–Manzana–Ryalcao	+ 6' 29"
9	Flavio Giupponi (ITA)	Mercatone Uno–Medeghini–Zucchini	+ 7' 23"
10	Leonardo Sierra (VEN)	ZG Mobili–Selle Italia	+ 9' 29"

== Stage 18 ==
10 June 1992 — Vercelli to Pian del Re, 200 km (120 mi)

Stage 18 result

Rank	Rider	Team	Time
1	Marco Giovannetti (ITA)	Gatorade–Chateau d'Ax	5h 38' 19"
2	Massimiliano Lelli (ITA)	Ariostea	+ 9"
3	Miguel Induráin (ESP)	Banesto	+ 19"
4	Claudio Chiappucci (ITA)	Carrera Jeans–Vagabond	s.t.
5	Franco Vona (ITA)	GB–MG Maglificio	s.t.
6	Andrew Hampsten (USA)	Motorola	s.t.
7	Franco Chioccioli (ITA)	GB–MG Maglificio	+ 23"
8	Fabrice Philipot (FRA)	Banesto	+ 32"
9	Luis Herrera (COL)	Postobón–Manzana–Ryalcao	+ 36"
10	Roberto Conti (ITA)	Ariostea	+ 43"

General classification after Stage 18

Rank	Rider	Team	Time
1	Miguel Induráin (ESP)	Banesto	86h 36' 58"
2	Claudio Chiappucci (ITA)	Carrera Jeans–Vagabond	+ 2' 18"
3	Franco Vona (ITA)	GB–MG Maglificio	+ 3' 14"
4	Andrew Hampsten (USA)	Motorola	+ 3' 30"
5	Roberto Conti (ITA)	Ariostea	+ 3' 35"
6	Franco Chioccioli (ITA)	GB–MG Maglificio	s.t.
7	Marco Giovannetti (ITA)	Gatorade–Chateau d'Ax	+ 3' 43"
8	Luis Herrera (COL)	Postobón–Manzana–Ryalcao	+ 6' 50"
9	Flavio Giupponi (ITA)	Mercatone Uno–Medeghini–Zucchini	+ 9' 12"
10	Bruno Cornillet (FRA)	Z	+ 10' 45"

== Stage 19 ==
11 June 1992 — Saluzzo to Pila, 186 km (116 mi)

Stage 19 result

Rank	Rider	Team	Time
1	Udo Bölts (GER)	Team Telekom	7h 21' 11"
2	Ramón González Arrieta (ESP)	Lotus–Festina	+ 1' 38"
3	Franco Chioccioli (ITA)	GB–MG Maglificio	+ 1' 54"
4	Claudio Chiappucci (ITA)	Carrera Jeans–Vagabond	s.t.
5	Miguel Induráin (ESP)	Banesto	s.t.
6	Pavel Tonkov (RUS)	Lampre–Colnago	s.t.
7	Marco Giovannetti (ITA)	Gatorade–Chateau d'Ax	s.t.
8	Franco Vona (ITA)	GB–MG Maglificio	+ 2' 18"
9	Andrew Hampsten (USA)	Motorola	+ 2' 33"
10	Uwe Ampler (GER)	Team Telekom	+ 2' 56"

General classification after Stage 19

Rank	Rider	Team	Time
1	Miguel Induráin (ESP)	Banesto	94h 00' 03"
2	Claudio Chiappucci (ITA)	Carrera Jeans–Vagabond	+ 2' 18"
3	Franco Chioccioli (ITA)	GB–MG Maglificio	+ 3' 31"
4	Franco Vona (ITA)	GB–MG Maglificio	+ 3' 38"
5	Marco Giovannetti (ITA)	Gatorade–Chateau d'Ax	+ 3' 43"
6	Andrew Hampsten (USA)	Motorola	+ 4' 09"
7	Luis Herrera (COL)	Postobón–Manzana–Ryalcao	+ 9' 10"
8	Pavel Tonkov (RUS)	Lampre–Colnago	+ 11' 09"
9	Roberto Conti (ITA)	Ariostea	+ 11' 17"
10	Bruno Cornillet (FRA)	Z	+ 13' 09"

== Stage 20 ==
12 June 1992 — Saint Vincent to Verbania, 201 km (125 mi)

Stage 20 result

Rank	Rider	Team	Time
1	Franco Chioccioli (ITA)	GB–MG Maglificio	5h 52' 31"
2	Claudio Chiappucci (ITA)	Carrera Jeans–Vagabond	s.t.
3	Massimiliano Lelli (ITA)	Ariostea	s.t.
4	Miguel Induráin (ESP)	Banesto	s.t.
5	Massimo Ghirotto (ITA)	Carrera Jeans–Vagabond	+ 17"
6	Marco Giovannetti (ITA)	Gatorade–Chateau d'Ax	s.t.
7	Pavel Tonkov (RUS)	Lampre–Colnago	s.t.
8	Roberto Conti (ITA)	Ariostea	s.t.
9	Andrew Hampsten (USA)	Motorola	s.t.
10	Luis Herrera (COL)	Postobón–Manzana–Ryalcao	s.t.

General classification after Stage 20

Rank	Rider	Team	Time
1	Miguel Induráin (ESP)	Banesto	99h 52' 34"
2	Claudio Chiappucci (ITA)	Carrera Jeans–Vagabond	+ 2' 10"
3	Franco Chioccioli (ITA)	GB–MG Maglificio	+ 3' 19"
4	Marco Giovannetti (ITA)	Gatorade–Chateau d'Ax	+ 4' 00"
5	Andrew Hampsten (USA)	Motorola	+ 4' 26"
6	Franco Vona (ITA)	GB–MG Maglificio	+ 4' 34"
7	Luis Herrera (COL)	Postobón–Manzana–Ryalcao	+ 9' 27"
8	Pavel Tonkov (RUS)	Lampre–Colnago	+ 11' 26"
9	Roberto Conti (ITA)	Ariostea	+ 11' 34"
10	Bruno Cornillet (FRA)	Z	+ 14' 41"

== Stage 21 ==
13 June 1992 — Verbania to Vigevano, 95 km (59 mi)

Stage 21 result

Rank	Rider	Team	Time
1	Mario Cipollini (ITA)	GB–MG Maglificio	2h 24' 34"
2	Alessio Di Basco (ITA)	Amore & Vita–Fanini	s.t.
3	Max Sciandri (ITA)	Motorola	s.t.
4	François Simon (FRA)	Castorama	s.t.
5	Giovanni Fidanza (ITA)	Gatorade–Chateau d'Ax	s.t.
6	Massimo Strazzer (ITA)	Jolly Componibili–Club 88	s.t.
7	Ján Svorada (CSK)	Lampre–Colnago	s.t.
8	Silvio Martinello (ITA)	Mercatone Uno–Medeghini–Zucchini	s.t.
9	Adriano Baffi (ITA)	Ariostea	s.t.
10	Giovanni Strazzer (ITA)	ZG Mobili–Selle Italia	s.t.

General classification after Stage 21

Rank	Rider	Team	Time
1	Miguel Induráin (ESP)	Banesto	102h 17' 18"
2	Claudio Chiappucci (ITA)	Carrera Jeans–Vagabond	+ 2' 10"
3	Franco Chioccioli (ITA)	GB–MG Maglificio	+ 3' 19"
4	Marco Giovannetti (ITA)	Gatorade–Chateau d'Ax	+ 4' 00"
5	Andrew Hampsten (USA)	Motorola	+ 4' 26"
6	Franco Vona (ITA)	GB–MG Maglificio	+ 4' 34"
7	Luis Herrera (COL)	Postobón–Manzana–Ryalcao	+ 9' 27"
8	Pavel Tonkov (RUS)	Lampre–Colnago	+ 11' 26"
9	Roberto Conti (ITA)	Ariostea	+ 11' 34"
10	Bruno Cornillet (FRA)	Z	+ 14' 41"

== Stage 22 ==
14 June 1992 — Vigevano to Milan, 66 km (41 mi) (ITT)

Stage 22 result

Rank	Rider	Team	Time
1	Miguel Induráin (ESP)	Banesto	1h 19' 00"
2	Guido Bontempi (ITA)	Carrera Jeans–Vagabond	+ 2' 46"
3	Laurent Bezault (FRA)	Z	+ 2' 51"
4	Nico Emonds (BEL)	Mercatone Uno–Medeghini–Zucchini	+ 2' 53"
5	Claudio Chiappucci (ITA)	Carrera Jeans–Vagabond	+ 3' 02"
6	Zenon Jaskuła (POL)	GB–MG Maglificio	+ 3' 20"
7	Laurent Fignon (FRA)	Gatorade–Chateau d'Ax	+ 3' 29"
8	Gérard Rué (FRA)	Castorama	+ 3' 36"
9	Viktor Klimov (UKR)	Seur	+ 3' 40"
10	Giancarlo Perini (ITA)	Carrera Jeans–Vagabond	+ 3' 46"

General classification after Stage 22

Rank	Rider	Team	Time
1	Miguel Induráin (ESP)	Banesto	103h 36' 08"
2	Claudio Chiappucci (ITA)	Carrera Jeans–Vagabond	+ 5' 12"
3	Franco Chioccioli (ITA)	GB–MG Maglificio	+ 7' 16"
4	Marco Giovannetti (ITA)	Gatorade–Chateau d'Ax	+ 8' 01"
5	Andrew Hampsten (USA)	Motorola	+ 9' 16"
6	Franco Vona (ITA)	GB–MG Maglificio	+ 11' 12"
7	Pavel Tonkov (RUS)	Lampre–Colnago	+ 17' 15"
8	Luis Herrera (COL)	Postobón–Manzana–Ryalcao	+ 17' 53"
9	Roberto Conti (ITA)	Ariostea	+ 19' 14"
10	Bruno Cornillet (FRA)	Z	+ 20' 03"
