= Punta San Matteo =

Mountain in Italy

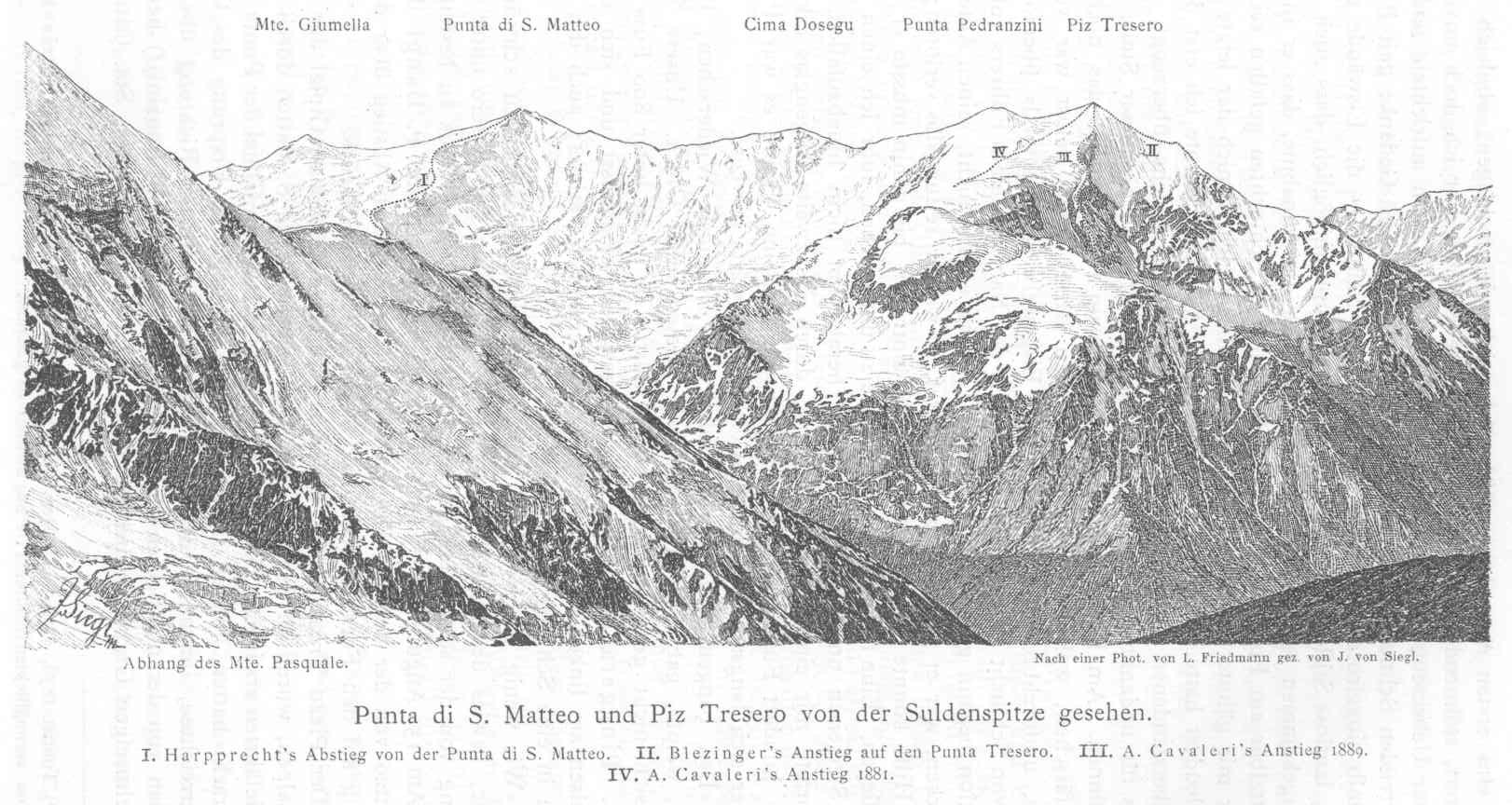

Highest point
- Elevation: 3,678 m (12,067 ft)
- Listing: Alpine mountains above 3000 m
- Coordinates: 46°22′44″N 10°34′00″E

Naming
- English translation: Saint Matthew's Peak
- Language of name: Italian

Geography
- Location within Italy
- Location: Border between Lombardy and Trentino-Alto Adige/Südtirol
- Parent range: Ortler Alps

Climbing
- First ascent: 28 June 1865 by Francis Fox Tuckett, Douglas William Freshfield, James Backhouse, George Henry Fox, François Devouassoud and Peter Michel

Punta San Matteo is a secondary peak of Ortler-Vioz in the Ortler Alps, at the border between the Province of Sondrio (Lombardy region) and Trentino (Trentino-Alto Adige/Südtirol region) in northern Italy.

It was the scene of the Battle of San Matteo in World War I, which, until the 1999 Kargil war, has been the highest battlefield in modern warfare history.

== Climbing Punta San Matteo ==
The easiest approach and the normal route starts from the Gavia Pass side with a good access road from Bormio. It is best to park in the vicinity of the Berni hut and the monument which is on the opposite side of the road. This is an alpinist glacier tour and the glacier is full of crevasses. The climb can be done in one day.

An alternative option is to start from the same place but, instead of climbing up the glacier, walk in the direction of the Bivacco Battaglione Ortles which is at 3122 m of elevation, there is no guardian and it is always open. The Bivacco can be reached in 3 hours from the road. In summer this is just a walk up with no snow on the route all the way to the Bivacco. There are 6 places for sleeping and blankets are available. There is a wood burning stove inside. You can stay the night in the Bivacco and then follow the ridge route to the summit of Punta San Matteo.

== Huts ==
The mentioned Rifugio A. Berni is the most convenient place if one wants to climb the mountain directly from the road. The closest refuge to the summit from this side is the previously mentioned Bivacco Battaglione Ortles (3122 m). There is also Rifugio Bonetta directly on the Gavia Pass with plenty of free parking space around.
