= Gavia Pass =

Mountain pass in Italy

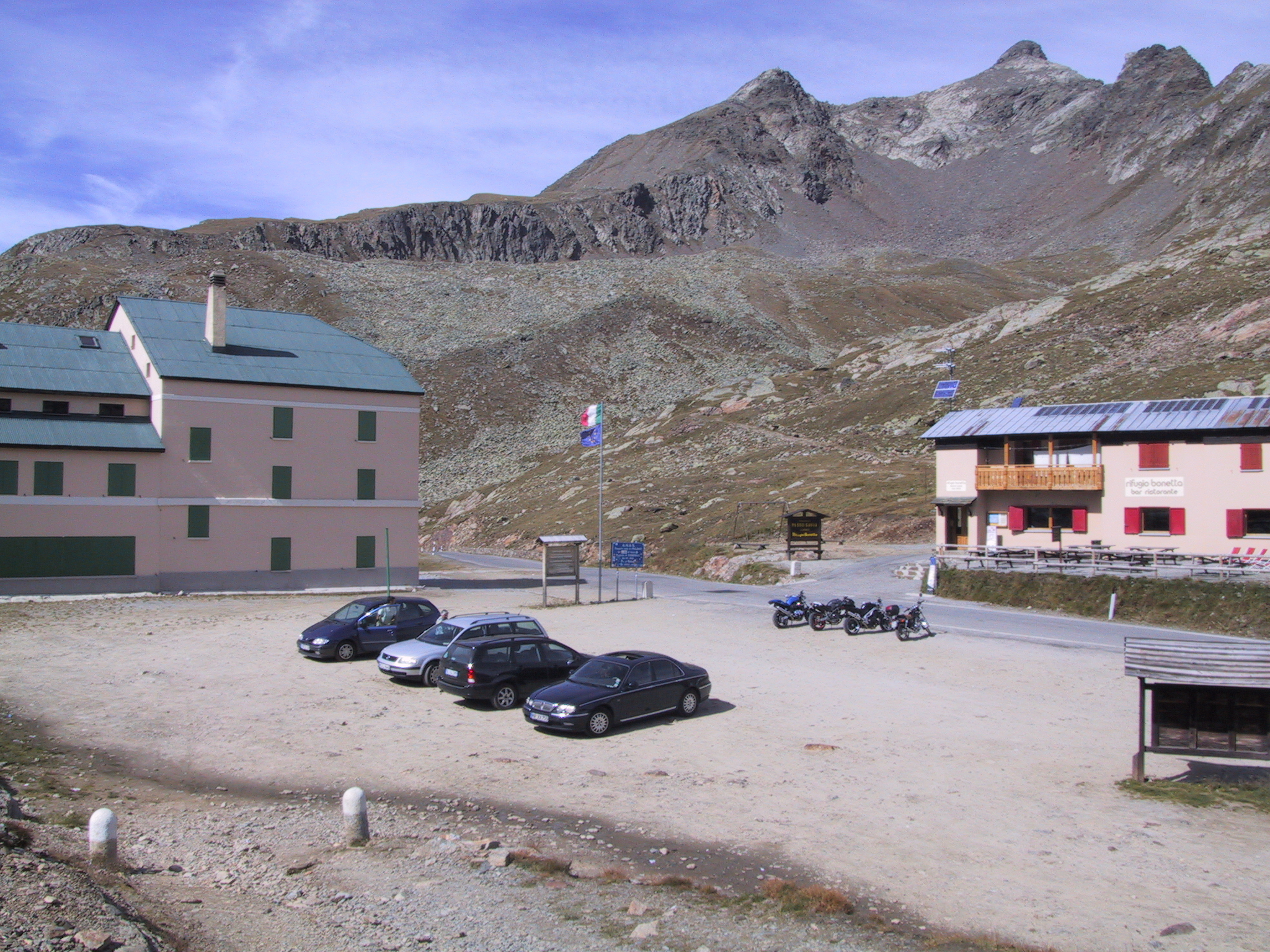
- The pass

- Location within Alps
- Elevation: 2,621 m (8,599 ft)
- Traversed by: SS 300

Third Approach
- Location: Sondrio/Brescia, Italy
- Coordinates: 46°20′37″N 10°29′15″E

Gavia Pass (Italian: Passo di Gavia) (el. 2621 m.) is a high mountain pass in the Italian Alps. It is the tenth highest paved road in the Alps.

The pass lies in the Lombardy region and divides the province of Sondrio to the north and the province of Brescia to the south. The road over the pass (SS 300) connects Bormio to the northwest with Ponte di Legno to the south and is single track most on its southern section.

== Climbing around Gavia Pass ==
There are many peaks to climb around. Directly above the pass on its east side is Corno dei Tre Signori (3360 m) and next to it Monte Gaviola (3025). On the other side of the road raises Monte Gavia (3223 m). By continuing along the road in the direction of Bormio, after less than 3 km, one arrives at the monument from where routes start for the Punta San Matteo (3678 m) group. The group includes Pizo Tresero (3594 m), Punta Pendranzini (3599), Cima Dosegu (3560) and several others.

== Huts ==
Several huts dot the area. Rifugio Bonetta is positioned right on the Pass, while Rifugio A. Berni is located nearby the monument. Further up in the mountains, at 3398 meters, is Bivacco Seveso, situated directly below the summit of Tresero. Another refuge, Bivacco Battaglione Ortles, lies below Cima di Val Umbrina at 3122 meters altitude.

== Giro d'Italia ==
The Gavia Pass is often on the route of the Giro d'Italia road bicycle race and is sometimes designated the Cima Coppi, the highest point of the race. On 5 June 1988, the race passed over the Gavia in a snowstorm, making for an epic stage won by Erik Breukink. American Andrew Hampsten, the second-place finisher, became the overall race leader and went on to win the Giro.

=== Appearances in Giro d'Italia (since 1960) ===
Year	Stage	Category	Start	Finish	Leader at the summit
2014	16	HC	Ponte di Legno	Val Martello (Martelltal)	Robinson Chalapud (COL)
2010	20	Cima Coppi	Bormio	Passo del Tonale	Johann Tschopp (SWI)
2008	20	Cima Coppi	Rovetta	Tirano	Julio Alberto Pérez Cuapio (MEX)
2006	20	Cima Coppi	Trento	Aprica	Juan Manuel Gárate (ESP)
2004	18	Cima Coppi	Cles	Bormio	Vladimir Miholjević (CRO)
2000	14	HC	Bra	Borgo San Dalmazzo	Chepe González (COL)
1999	21	Cima Coppi	Madonna di Campiglio	Aprica	Chepe González (COL)
1996	21	Cima Coppi	Cavalese	Aprica	Hernán Buenahora (COL)
1988	14	Cima Coppi	Chiesa in Valmalenco	Bormio	Johan van der Velde (NED)
1960	20		Trento	Bormio	Imerio Massignan (ITA)

== Gallery ==
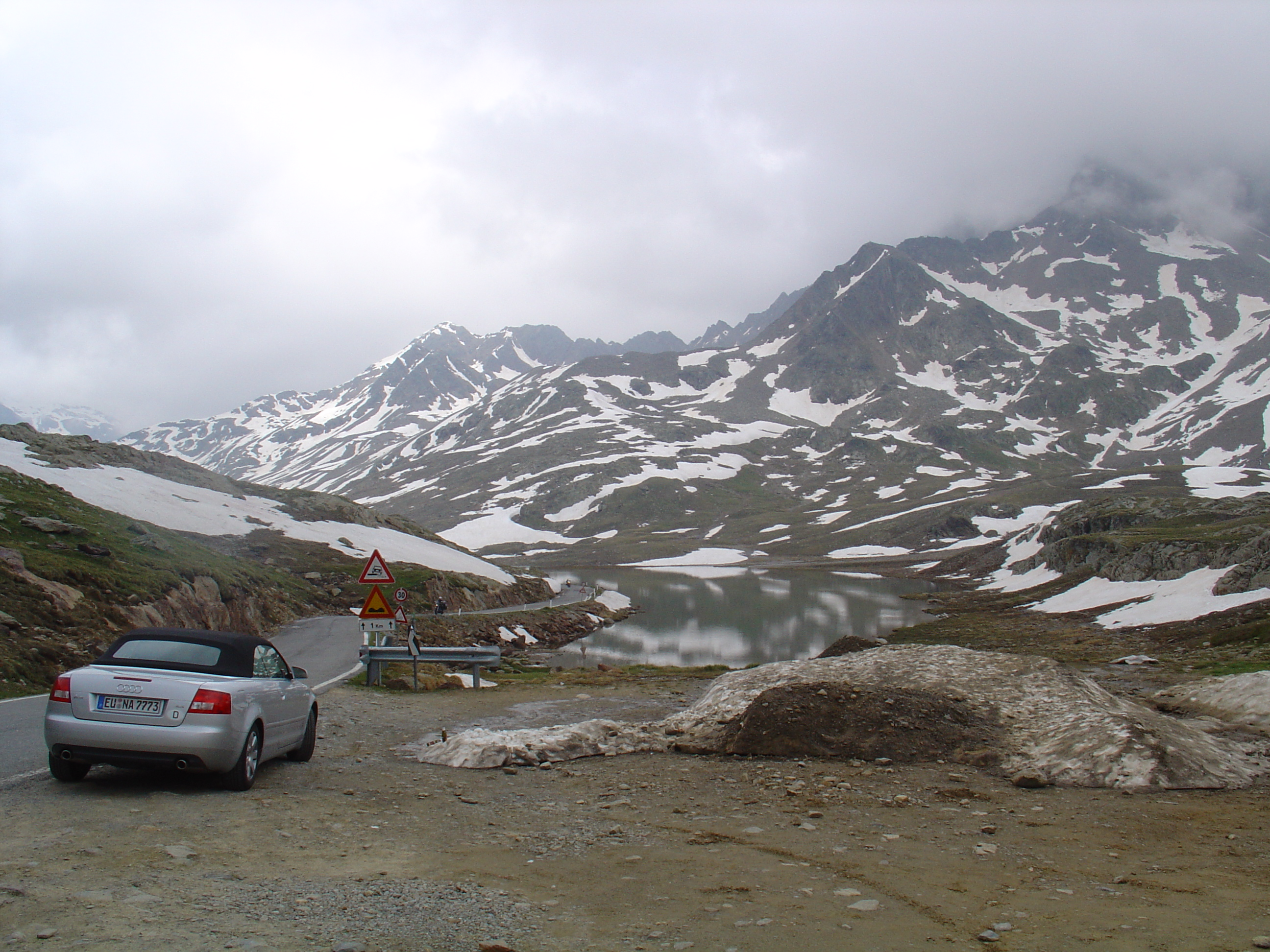
The lake near the pass

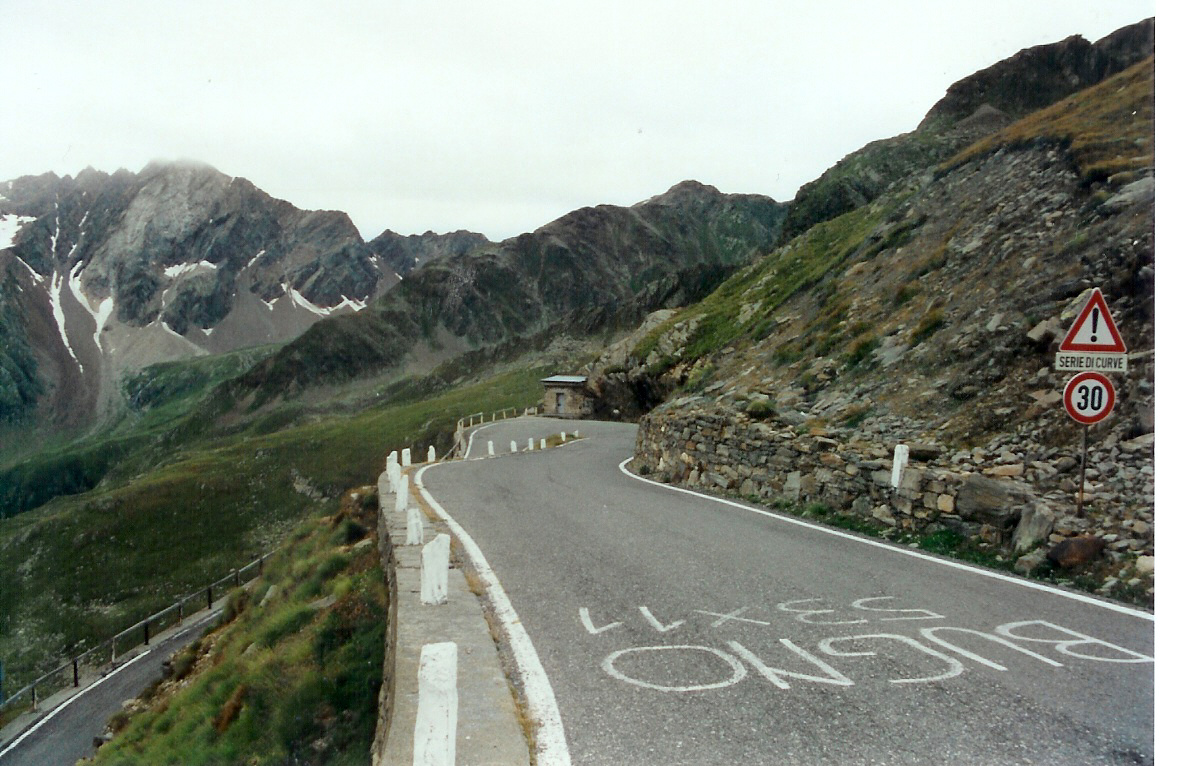
Road on the southern side

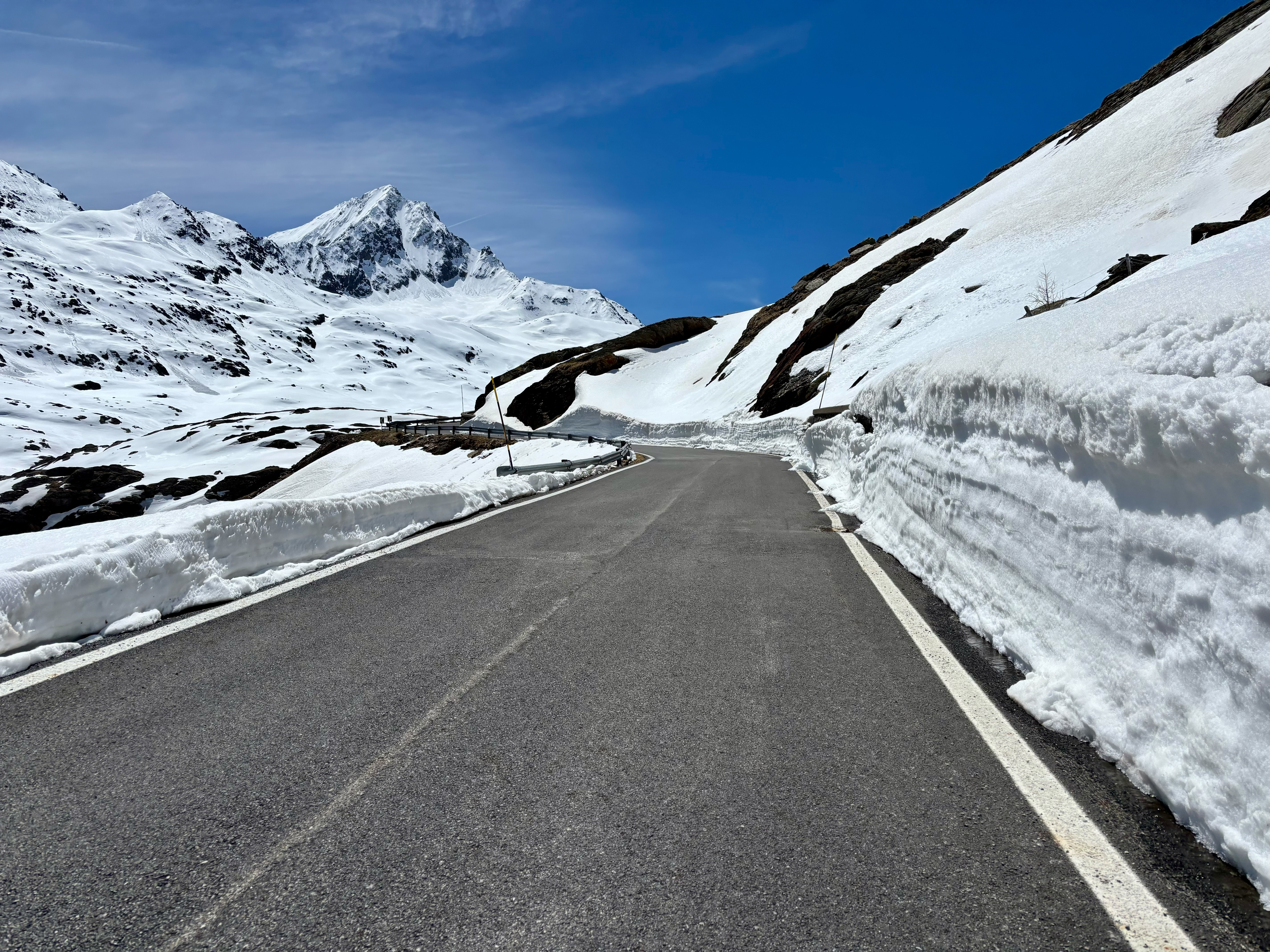
Road on the northern side

== See also ==
- List of highest paved roads in Europe
- List of mountain passes
