= Julio Alberto Pérez =

Mexican racing cyclist

Julio Alberto Pérez Cuapio
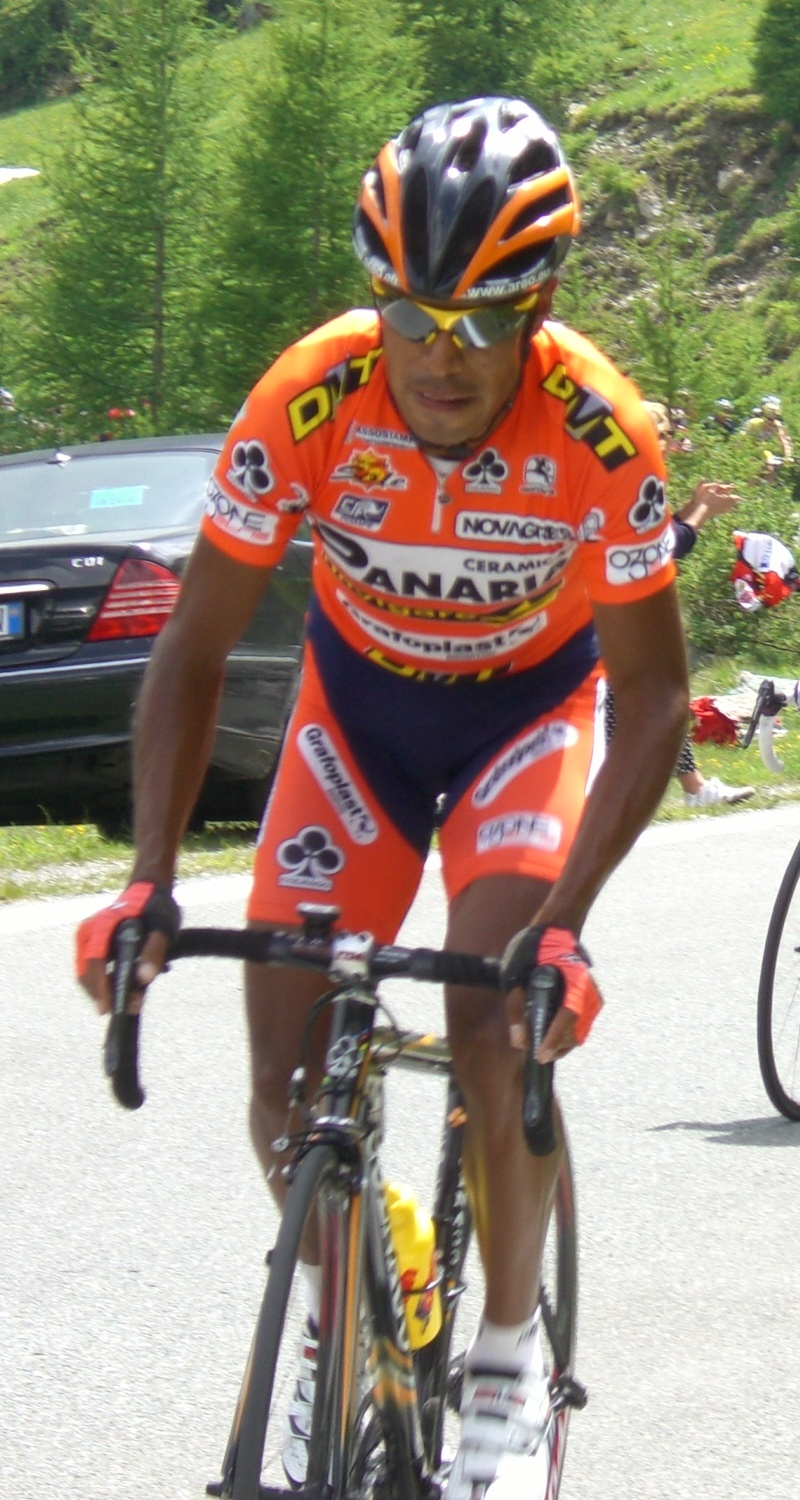
- Alberto Pérez at the 2007 Giro d'Italia

Personal information
- Full name: Julio Alberto Pérez Cuapio
- Born: July 30, 1977 (age 49) Tlaxcala, Mexico
- Height: 1.71 m (5 ft 7 in)
- Weight: 58 kg (128 lb)

Cycling career
- Sport: Cycling
- Current team: Retired
- Discipline: Road
- Role: Rider
- Rider type: Climber

Amateur teams
- 1998: Canel's Turbo
- 1999: Centri della Calzatura–Auto Lelli–Granatelli
- 2010: Empacadora San Marcos

Professional teams
- 2000–2008: Ceramica Panaria–Gaerne
- 2009: Canel's Turbo–Mayordomo

Major wins
- Grand Tours Giro d'Italia Mountains classification (2002) 3 individual stages (2001, 2002) Stage races Giro del Trentino (2005)

Julio Alberto Pérez Cuapio (born July 30, 1977) is a former Mexican racing cyclist who rode for CSF Group–Navigare between 2000 and 2008. He is best known for his stage wins in the Giro d'Italia. In 2001, he won on the Passo Pordoi ahead of Gilberto Simoni. In 2002, he also won in San Giacomo and in Corvara.

== Major results ==
2000
1st Trofeo dello Scalatore
2nd Overall Tour de Langkawi

1st Mountains classification
1st Stage 10

2001
1st Stage 13 Giro d'Italia
2002
Giro d'Italia

1st Mountains classification
1st Stages 13 & 16

2nd Overall Giro del Trentino
2003
1st Overall Settimana Ciclistica Lombarda

1st Mountains classification
1st Stage 2 (ITT)

2004
6th Overall Brixia Tour

1st Mountains classification
1st Stage 2a

2005
1st Overall Giro del Trentino
5th Overall Settimana Ciclista Lombarda
2008
4th Overall Vuelta a Costa Rica

1st Stage 14

2009
5th Overall Vuelta a Guatemala
9th Overall Vuelta Ciclista Chiapas
2010
8th Overall Vuelta Mexico Telmex

=== Grand Tour general classification results timeline ===
Grand Tour	2000	2001	2002	2003	2004	2005	2006	2007	2008	2009
Giro d'Italia	DNF	45	19	DNF	33	95	42	40	76	—
Tour de France	Did not contest during career									
Vuelta a España	—	80	—	—	—	—	—	—	—	—

Legend
—	Did not compete
DNF	Did not finish
