= 1988 Giro d'Italia, Stage 1 to Stage 11 =

Cycling race stages

Overview of the stages; red lines represent distances covered in the individual stages, while green dotted lines are the distances covered in transfers between the stages.

The 1988 Giro d'Italia began on 23 May, and stage 11 occurred on 2 June. The 1988 edition began with a short 9 km (5.6 mi) individual time trial around the city of Urbino. The following two days of racing were normal mass-start stages, before the fourth day of racing consisted of two half-stages, the first a normal stage and the latter a 40 km (24.9 mi) team time trial. The rest of the opening half of the race – remaining within Italy for the duration – consisted of stages with or without categorized climbs.

Jean-François Bernard became the first race leader, as he won the opening stage in Urbino; the first of two stage wins that Bernard achieved during the opening half of the race, along with the eighth stage. As a result, Bernard was the second rider to win multiple stages in the opening half of the race, after Guido Bontempi who won stages 2 and 5. Bernard lost the race leader's maglia rosa (English: pink jersey) after stage 4a to Massimo Podenzana, who had been a part of a breakaway that survived and finished minutes ahead of the peloton. Podenzana held the lead all the way to the end of the eleventh stage.

Legend (Note: Jerseys appearing in the table on the left of the page indicate those worn by the cyclist during the particular stage, while those appearing in the table on the right of the page indicate those awarded to the cyclist after the stage.)
A pink jersey	Denotes the leader of the General classification	A green jersey	Denotes the leader of the Mountains classification
A purple jersey	Denotes the leader of the Points classification	A white jersey	Denotes the leader of the Young rider classification
A blue jersey	Denotes the leader of the Combination classification		

== Stage 1 ==
23 May 1988 — Urbino, 9 km (5.6 mi)

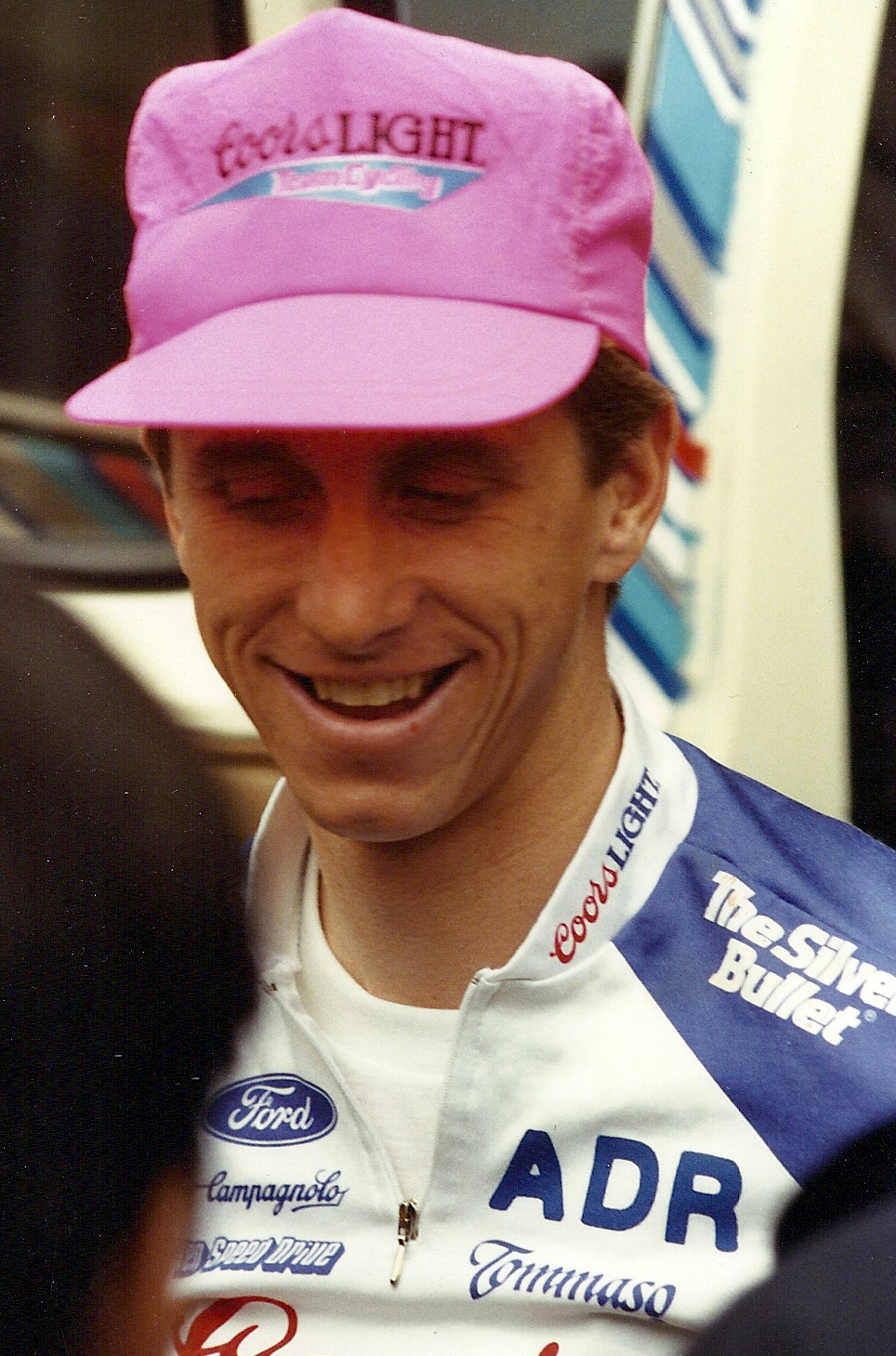
American Greg LeMond (pictured here at the 1989 Tour de Trump) time for the time trial was inhibited when his chain dropped halfway through the stage.

The first stage of the 1988 edition of the event was a 9 km (5.6 mi) individual time trial that navigated the streets of Urbino. An El Mundo Deportivo writer stated that the course was fast. The first 2.2 km (1.4 mi) were the fastest section of the course because the route was downhill. After the course passed the railroad station in Urbino, the course began to increase slightly in elevation until the finish. The writer also noted two bends, one at Via della Stazione (2 km (1.2 mi) in) and the other at Ciale Comandino (8.2 km (5.1 mi) in), which he classified as "dangerous." The first rider was scheduled to start at 13:30 local time.

Greg LeMond (PDM–Ultima–Concorde) suffered from a dropped chain halfway through the course, which caused him to post a "horrible" time according to El País writer Luis Gómez. Tony Rominger (Chateau d'Ax), Erik Breukink (Panasonic–Isostar–Colnago–Agu), and Erich Maechler (Carrera Jeans–Vagabond) chose to use rear lenticular wheels instead of a traditional wheel with spokes. Rominger came in second overall with a time of 13' 10", Breukink came in fourth at 13' 15", and Maechler came in third after finishing with the same time as Breukink. After the stage, Rominger told reporters that his time slower than it could have been due to a fall that occurred due to his front wheel being too inflated. Pedro Delgado (Reynolds), who rode a standard bike, finished in twentieth position, twenty-eight seconds behind stage winner Jean-François Bernard (Toshiba–Look). Bernard traversed the course with the fastest time of 13' 07" at a pace of 41.168 km/h. With the time bonuses added to the top three finisher's times, Bernard's lead was increased to eight seconds over Rominger.

Stage 1 result and general classification after stage 1
Rank	Rider	Team	Time
1	Jean-François Bernard (FRA)	Toshiba–Look	13' 07"
2	Tony Rominger (SUI)	Chateau d'Ax	+3"
3	Lech Piasecki (POL)	Del Tongo–Colnago	+6"
4	Erik Breukink (NED)	Panasonic–Isostar–Colnago–Agu	+8"
5	Erich Maechler (SUI)	Carrera Jeans–Vagabond	+8"
6	Roberto Visentini (ITA)	Carrera Jeans–Vagabond	+9"
7	Guido Bontempi (ITA)	Carrera Jeans–Vagabond	+13"
8	Roberto Pagnin (ITA)	Gewiss–Bianchi	+13"
9	Giuseppe Saronni (ITA)	Del Tongo–Colnago	+16"
10	Jörg Müller (SUI)	PDM–Ultima–Concorde	+18"

== Stage 2 ==
24 May 1988 — Urbino to Ascoli Piceno, 230 km (142.9 mi)

The second stage of the race was one of the longer ones in the race and featured two third category climbs, the Santa Vittoria (626 m (2,053.8 ft)) and the Valico Croce di Casale (731 m (2,398.3 ft)). The intermediate sprint for the stage was located 19 km (11.8 mi) into the stage in Fossombrona. The first categorized climb was set to be crossed after 178 km (110.6 mi) had been covered, and the second after 204 km (126.8 mi). With the last climb coming over twenty kilometers before the finish of the stage, it was expected that the stage would finish with a field sprint. The stage was set to begin at 10:30 local time.

All 180 riders started the second stage of the race in Urbino. The peloton remained intact through the intermediate sprint. Alessio Di Basco (Fanini–Seven Up) won the sprint and was followed by Domenico Cavallo (Isoglass-Galli) and Paul Popp (Malvor–Bottecchia) in second and third, respectively.

Renato Piccolo (Gewiss–Bianchi) was the first over the climb of the Santa Vittoria. Stefano Giuliani (Chateau d'Ax) won the sprint to the top of Croce di Casale, while Piccolo came in third. Giuliani's points gained during the day were enough to give him the lead in the mountains classification.

Angelo Lecchi (Del Tongo–Colnago) and Giuliani were caught with six kilometers to go in the leg. Guido Bontempi (Carrera Jeans–Vagabond) won the sprint finish.

Stage 2 result
Rank	Rider	Team	Time
1	Guido Bontempi (ITA)	Carrera Jeans–Vagabond	6h 20' 56"
2	Rolf Sørensen (DEN)	Ceramiche Ariostea	+0"
3	Paolo Rosola (ITA)	Gewiss–Bianchi	+0"
4	Alessio Di Basco (ITA)	Fanini–Seven Up	+0"
5	Roberto Pagnin (ITA)	Gewiss–Bianchi	+0"
6	Johan van der Velde (NED)	Gisgelati-Ecoflam	+0"
7	Urs Freuler (SUI)	Panasonic–Isostar–Colnago–Agu	+0"
8	Fabrice Philipot (FRA)	Toshiba–Look	+0"
9	Eric Vanderaerden (BEL)	Panasonic–Isostar–Colnago–Agu	+0"
10	Pierino Gavazzi (ITA)	Fanini–Seven Up	+0"

General classification after stage 2
Rank	Rider	Team	Time
1	Jean-François Bernard (FRA)	Toshiba–Look	6h 33' 43"
2	Tony Rominger (SUI)	Chateau d'Ax	+8"
3	Guido Bontempi (ITA)	Carrera Jeans–Vagabond	+13"
4	Lech Piasecki (POL)	Del Tongo–Colnago	+16"
5	Erik Breukink (NED)	Panasonic–Isostar–Colnago–Agu	+28"
6	Erich Maechler (SUI)	Carrera Jeans–Vagabond	+28"
7	Roberto Visentini (ITA)	Carrera Jeans–Vagabond	+29"
8	Roberto Pagnin (ITA)	Gewiss–Bianchi	+33"
9	Giuseppe Saronni (ITA)	Del Tongo–Colnago	+36"
10	Jörg Müller (SUI)	PDM–Ultima–Concorde	+38"

== Stage 3 ==
25 May 1988 — Ascoli Piceno to Vasto, 184 km (114.3 mi)

Stage 3 result
Rank	Rider	Team	Time
1	Stephan Joho (SUI)	Ceramiche Ariostea	4h 35' 47"
2	Emanuele Bombini (ITA)	Gewiss–Bianchi	+0"
3	Fabio Bordonali (ITA)	Carrera Jeans–Vagabond	+0"
4	Rolf Sørensen (DEN)	Ceramiche Ariostea	+0"
5	Guido Bontempi (ITA)	Carrera Jeans–Vagabond	+6"
6	Eric Vanderaerden (BEL)	Panasonic–Isostar–Colnago–Agu	+6"
7	Andreas Kappes (FRG)	Toshiba–Look	+6"
8	Johan van der Velde (NED)	Gisgelati-Ecoflam	+6"
9	Davis Phinney (USA)	7-Eleven–Hoonved	+6"
10	Urs Freuler (SUI)	Panasonic–Isostar–Colnago–Agu	+6"

General classification after stage 3
Rank	Rider	Team	Time
1	Jean-François Bernard (FRA)	Toshiba–Look	11h 09' 36"
2	Tony Rominger (SUI)	Chateau d'Ax	+8"
3	Guido Bontempi (ITA)	Carrera Jeans–Vagabond	+13"
4	Lech Piasecki (POL)	Del Tongo–Colnago	+16"
5	Erik Breukink (NED)	Panasonic–Isostar–Colnago–Agu	+28"
6	Erich Maechler (SUI)	Carrera Jeans–Vagabond	+28"
7	Stephan Joho (SUI)	Ceramiche Ariostea	+29"
8	Roberto Visentini (ITA)	Carrera Jeans–Vagabond	+29"
9	Emanuele Bombini (ITA)	Gewiss–Bianchi	+33"
10	Roberto Pagnin (ITA)	Gewiss–Bianchi	+33"

== Stage 4a ==
26 May 1988 — Vasto to Rodi Garganico, 123 km (76.4 mi)

Stage 4a result'
Rank	Rider	Team	Time
1	Massimo Podenzana (ITA)	Atala–Ofmega	2h 50' 25"
2	Stefano Tomasini (ITA)	Fanini–Seven Up	+5' 13"
3	Enrico Galleschi (ITA)	Alba Cucine-Benotto	+5' 13"
4	Rolf Sørensen (DEN)	Ceramiche Ariostea	+5' 13"
5	Adriano Baffi (ITA)	Gisgelati-Ecoflam	+5' 18"
6	Johan van der Velde (NED)	Gisgelati-Ecoflam	+5' 18"
7	Alessio Di Basco (ITA)	Fanini–Seven Up	+5' 18"
8	Stephan Joho (SUI)	Ceramiche Ariostea	+5' 18"
9	Flavio Chesini (ITA)	Alba Cucine-Benotto	+5' 18"
10	Luciano Boffo (ITA)	Alfa Lum-Legnano	+5' 18"

General classification after stage 4a
Rank	Rider	Team	Time
1	Massimo Podenzana (ITA)	Atala–Ofmega	14h 00' 47"
2	Jean-François Bernard (FRA)	Toshiba–Look	+4' 32"
3	Tony Rominger (SUI)	Chateau d'Ax	+4' 40"
4	Guido Bontempi (ITA)	Carrera Jeans–Vagabond	+4' 45"
5	Lech Piasecki (POL)	Del Tongo–Colnago	+4' 48"
6	Erich Maechler (SUI)	Carrera Jeans–Vagabond	+5' 00"
7	Erik Breukink (NED)	Panasonic–Isostar–Colnago–Agu	+5' 00"
8	Stephan Joho (SUI)	Ceramiche Ariostea	+5' 01"
9	Roberto Visentini (ITA)	Carrera Jeans–Vagabond	+5' 01"
10	Roberto Pagnin (ITA)	Gewiss–Bianchi	+5' 05"

== Stage 4b ==
26 May 1988 — Rodi Garganico to Vieste, 40 km (24.9 mi)

Stage 4b result
Rank	Rider	Team	Time
1	Del Tongo–Colnago	50' 30"	
2	Carrera Jeans–Vagabond	+11"	
3	Gewiss–Bianchi	+57"	
4	Cyndarella-Isotonic	+59"	
5	Panasonic–Isostar–Colnago–Agu	+1' 06"	
6	Gisgelati-Ecoflam	+1' 11"	
7	Chateau d'Ax	+1' 12"	
8	Ceramiche Ariostea	+1' 31"	
9	7-Eleven–Hoonved	+1' 36"	
10	PDM–Ultima–Concorde	+1' 36"	

General classification after stage 4b
Rank	Rider	Team	Time
1	Massimo Podenzana (ITA)	Atala–Ofmega	14h 53' 53"
2	Lech Piasecki (POL)	Del Tongo–Colnago	+2' 12"
3	Giuseppe Saronni (ITA)	Del Tongo–Colnago	+2' 32"
4	Erich Maechler (SUI)	Carrera Jeans–Vagabond	+2' 35"
5	Franco Chioccioli (ITA)	Del Tongo–Colnago	+2' 36"
6	Roberto Visentini (ITA)	Carrera Jeans–Vagabond	+2' 36"
7	Flavio Giupponi (ITA)	Del Tongo–Colnago	+2' 39"
8	Fabio Bordonali (ITA)	Carrera Jeans–Vagabond	+2' 41"
9	Massimo Ghirotto (ITA)	Carrera Jeans–Vagabond	+2' 46"
10	Urs Zimmermann (SUI)	Carrera Jeans–Vagabond	+2' 47"

== Stage 5 ==
27 May 1988 — Vieste to Santa Maria Capua Vetere, 260 km (161.6 mi)

Stage 5 result
Rank	Rider	Team	Time
1	Guido Bontempi (ITA)	Carrera Jeans–Vagabond	7h 21' 42"
2	Johan van der Velde (NED)	Gisgelati-Ecoflam	+0"
3	Stefano Allocchio (ITA)	Chateau d'Ax	+0"
4	Alessio Di Basco (ITA)	Fanini–Seven Up	+0"
5	Adriano Baffi (ITA)	Gisgelati-Ecoflam	+0"
6	Flavio Chesini (ITA)	Alba Cucine-Benotto	+0"
7	Rolf Sørensen (DEN)	Ceramiche Ariostea	+0"
8	Andreas Kappes (FRG)	Toshiba–Look	+0"
9	Luciano Boffo (ITA)	Alfa Lum-Legnano	+0"
10	Urs Freuler (SUI)	Panasonic–Isostar–Colnago–Agu	+0"

General classification after stage 5
Rank	Rider	Team	Time
1	Massimo Podenzana (ITA)	Atala–Ofmega	22h 16' 17"
2	Massimo Ghirotto (ITA)	Carrera Jeans–Vagabond	+2' 04"
3	Lech Piasecki (POL)	Del Tongo–Colnago	+2' 12"
4	Giuseppe Saronni (ITA)	Del Tongo–Colnago	+2' 32"
5	Erich Maechler (SUI)	Carrera Jeans–Vagabond	+2' 35"
6	Franco Chioccioli (ITA)	Del Tongo–Colnago	+2' 36"
7	Roberto Visentini (ITA)	Carrera Jeans–Vagabond	+2' 36"
8	Flavio Giupponi (ITA)	Del Tongo–Colnago	+2' 39"
9	Fabio Bordonali (ITA)	Carrera Jeans–Vagabond	+2' 41"
10	Roberto Pagnin (ITA)	Gewiss–Bianchi	+2' 44"

== Stage 6 ==
28 May 1988 — Santa Maria Capua Vetere to Campitello Matese, 137 km (85.1 mi)

Stage 6 result
Rank	Rider	Team	Time
1	Franco Chioccioli (ITA)	Del Tongo–Colnago	3h 52' 55"
2	Andrew Hampsten (USA)	7-Eleven–Hoonved	+12"
3	Urs Zimmermann (SUI)	Carrera Jeans–Vagabond	+12"
4	Tony Rominger (SUI)	Chateau d'Ax	+23"
5	Silvano Contini (ITA)	Malvor–Bottecchia	+23"
6	Erik Breukink (NED)	Panasonic–Isostar–Colnago–Agu	+31"
7	Emanuele Bombini (ITA)	Gewiss–Bianchi	+35"
8	Johan van der Velde (NED)	Gisgelati-Ecoflam	+35"
9	Franco Vona (ITA)	Chateau d'Ax	+35"
10	Stefano Tomasini (ITA)	Fanini–Seven Up	+35"

General classification after stage 6
Rank	Rider	Team	Time
1	Massimo Podenzana (ITA)	Atala–Ofmega	26h 10' 13"
2	Franco Chioccioli (ITA)	Del Tongo–Colnago	+45"
3	Urs Zimmermann (SUI)	Carrera Jeans–Vagabond	+1' 18"
4	Roberto Visentini (ITA)	Carrera Jeans–Vagabond	+1' 40"
5	Flavio Giupponi (ITA)	Del Tongo–Colnago	+1' 43"
6	Tony Rominger (SUI)	Chateau d'Ax	+2' 08"
7	Erik Breukink (NED)	Panasonic–Isostar–Colnago–Agu	+2' 30"
8	Andrew Hampsten (USA)	7-Eleven–Hoonved	+2' 48"
9	Beat Breu (SUI)	Cyndarella-Isotonic	+2' 51"
10	Luca Rota (ITA)	Del Tongo–Colnago	+2' 54"

== Stage 7 ==
29 May 1988 — Campitello Matese to Avezzano, 178 km (110.6 mi)

Stage 7 result
Rank	Rider	Team	Time
1	Andreas Kappes (FRG)	Toshiba–Look	4h 38' 07"
2	Johan van der Velde (NED)	Gisgelati-Ecoflam	+0"
3	Luciano Boffo (ITA)	Alfa Lum-Legnano	+0"
4	Flavio Chesini (ITA)	Alba Cucine-Benotto	+0"
5	Claudio Corti (ITA)	Chateau d'Ax	+0"
6	Pierino Gavazzi (ITA)	Fanini–Seven Up	+0"
7	Eric Vanderaerden (BEL)	Panasonic–Isostar–Colnago–Agu	+0"
8	Lech Piasecki (POL)	Del Tongo–Colnago	+0"
9	Emanuele Bombini (ITA)	Gewiss–Bianchi	+0"
10	Giuseppe Petito (ITA)	Gisgelati-Ecoflam	+0"

General classification after stage 7
Rank	Rider	Team	Time
1	Massimo Podenzana (ITA)	Atala–Ofmega	30h 48' 20"
2	Franco Chioccioli (ITA)	Del Tongo–Colnago	+45"
3	Urs Zimmermann (SUI)	Carrera Jeans–Vagabond	+1' 18"
4	Roberto Visentini (ITA)	Carrera Jeans–Vagabond	+1' 40"
5	Flavio Giupponi (ITA)	Del Tongo–Colnago	+1' 43"
6	Tony Rominger (SUI)	Chateau d'Ax	+2' 08"
7	Erik Breukink (NED)	Panasonic–Isostar–Colnago–Agu	+2' 30"
8	Andrew Hampsten (USA)	7-Eleven–Hoonved	+2' 48"
9	Beat Breu (SUI)	Cyndarella-Isotonic	+2' 51"
10	Luca Rota (ITA)	Del Tongo–Colnago	+2' 54"

== Stage 8 ==
30 May 1988 — Avezzano to Chianciano Terme, 251 km (156.0 mi)

Stage 8 result
Rank	Rider	Team	Time
1	Jean-François Bernard (FRA)	Toshiba–Look	6h 46' 08"
2	Andreas Kappes (FRG)	Toshiba–Look	+28"
3	Johan van der Velde (NED)	Gisgelati-Ecoflam	+28"
4	Benny Van Brabant (BEL)	Tokke Zahor	+28"
5	Rolf Sørensen (DEN)	Ceramiche Ariostea	+28"
6	Flavio Chesini (ITA)	Alba Cucine-Benotto	+28"
7	Francesco Cesarini (ITA)	Ceramiche Ariostea	+28"
8	Claudio Chiappucci (ITA)	Carrera Jeans–Vagabond	+28"
9	Pierino Gavazzi (ITA)	Fanini–Seven Up	+28"
10	Claudio Corti (ITA)	Chateau d'Ax	+28"

General classification after stage 8
Rank	Rider	Team	Time
1	Massimo Podenzana (ITA)	Atala–Ofmega	37h 34' 56"
2	Franco Chioccioli (ITA)	Del Tongo–Colnago	+45"
3	Urs Zimmermann (SUI)	Carrera Jeans–Vagabond	+1' 18"
4	Roberto Visentini (ITA)	Carrera Jeans–Vagabond	+1' 40"
5	Flavio Giupponi (ITA)	Del Tongo–Colnago	+1' 43"
6	Tony Rominger (SUI)	Chateau d'Ax	+2' 08"
7	Jean-François Bernard (FRA)	Toshiba–Look	+2' 11"
8	Erik Breukink (NED)	Panasonic–Isostar–Colnago–Agu	+2' 30"
9	Andrew Hampsten (USA)	7-Eleven–Hoonved	+2' 38"
10	Beat Breu (SUI)	Cyndarella-Isotonic	+2' 48"

== Stage 9 ==
31 May 1988 — Pienza to Marina di Massa, 235 km (146.0 mi)

Stage 9 result
Rank	Rider	Team	Time
1	Alessio Di Basco (ITA)	Fanini–Seven Up	6h 09' 20"
2	Guido Bontempi (ITA)	Carrera Jeans–Vagabond	+0"
3	Urs Freuler (SUI)	Panasonic–Isostar–Colnago–Agu	+0"
4	Rolf Sørensen (DEN)	Ceramiche Ariostea	+0"
5	Patrizio Gambirasio (ITA)	Selca-Ciclolinea	+0"
6	Silvio Martinello (ITA)	Atala–Ofmega	+0"
7	Giovanni Strazzer (ITA)	Malvor–Bottecchia	+0"
8	Flavio Chesini (ITA)	Alba Cucine-Benotto	+0"
9	Johan van der Velde (NED)	Gisgelati-Ecoflam	+0"
10	Davis Phinney (USA)	7-Eleven–Hoonved	+0"

General classification after stage 9
Rank	Rider	Team	Time
1	Massimo Podenzana (ITA)	Atala–Ofmega	43h 44' 16"
2	Franco Chioccioli (ITA)	Del Tongo–Colnago	+45"
3	Urs Zimmermann (SUI)	Carrera Jeans–Vagabond	+1' 18"
4	Roberto Visentini (ITA)	Carrera Jeans–Vagabond	+1' 40"
5	Flavio Giupponi (ITA)	Del Tongo–Colnago	+1' 43"
6	Tony Rominger (SUI)	Chateau d'Ax	+2' 08"
7	Jean-François Bernard (FRA)	Toshiba–Look	+2' 11"
8	Erik Breukink (NED)	Panasonic–Isostar–Colnago–Agu	+2' 30"
9	Andrew Hampsten (USA)	7-Eleven–Hoonved	+2' 38"
10	Beat Breu (SUI)	Cyndarella-Isotonic	+2' 48"

== Stage 10 ==
1 June 1988 — Carrara to Salsomaggiore Terme, 190 km (118.1 mi)

Stage 10 result
Rank	Rider	Team	Time
1	Paolo Rosola (ITA)	Gewiss–Bianchi	5h 11' 04"
2	Adriano Baffi (ITA)	Gisgelati-Ecoflam	+0"
3	Rolf Sørensen (DEN)	Ceramiche Ariostea	+0"
4	Johan van der Velde (NED)	Gisgelati-Ecoflam	+0"
5	Eric Vanderaerden (BEL)	Panasonic–Isostar–Colnago–Agu	+0"
6	Davis Phinney (USA)	7-Eleven–Hoonved	+0"
7	Stefano Colagè (ITA)	Alba Cucine-Benotto	+0"
8	Luciano Boffo (ITA)	Alfa Lum-Legnano	+0"
9	Teun van Vliet (NED)	Panasonic–Isostar–Colnago–Agu	+0"
10	Rolf Järmann (SUI)	Cyndarella-Isotonic	+0"

General classification after stage 10
Rank	Rider	Team	Time
1	Massimo Podenzana (ITA)	Atala–Ofmega	48h 55' 20"
2	Franco Chioccioli (ITA)	Del Tongo–Colnago	+45"
3	Urs Zimmermann (SUI)	Carrera Jeans–Vagabond	+1' 18"
4	Roberto Visentini (ITA)	Carrera Jeans–Vagabond	+1' 40"
5	Flavio Giupponi (ITA)	Del Tongo–Colnago	+1' 43"
6	Tony Rominger (SUI)	Chateau d'Ax	+2' 08"
7	Jean-François Bernard (FRA)	Toshiba–Look	+2' 11"
8	Erik Breukink (NED)	Panasonic–Isostar–Colnago–Agu	+2' 30"
9	Andrew Hampsten (USA)	7-Eleven–Hoonved	+2' 38"
10	Beat Breu (SUI)	Cyndarella-Isotonic	+2' 48"

== Stage 11 ==
2 June 1988 — Parma to Colle Don Bosco, 229 km (142.3 mi)

The eleventh leg of the event was very flat and contained no categorized climbs. It was expected to be one of the last opportunities for the sprinters in the race to get a chance at a stage win. The stage's start was scheduled for 11:00 local time and was speculated to be finished at around 4:30.

Werner Stutz (Cyndarella-Isotonic) jumped off the front of the peloton with 54 km (33.6 mi). He rode solo and without issue until the closing kilometers of the race where fifty environmentalist protestors blocked the road. (Note: The sources disagree on where exactly the protestors were located on the course. El País claim they were located at around four kilometers to go, El Punt says the demonstration took place with two kilometers remaining, while El Mundo Deportivo, La Stampa, and Avui state that they protestors were located at around one kilometer to go.) The protestors were upset with a nearby factory, owned by chemical manufacturer Montedison, which the protestors claimed had been polluting the Bormida river. Stutz rode through the mass of people and went on to finish the stage in first position. The peloton, however, struggled to get past the protestors, which led race director Vincenzo Torriani to cancel the stage. The cancelling of the stage left no winner and the general classification standings were left unchanged.

General classification after stage 11
Rank	Rider	Team	Time
1	Massimo Podenzana (ITA)	Atala–Ofmega	48h 55' 20"
2	Franco Chioccioli (ITA)	Del Tongo–Colnago	+45"
3	Urs Zimmermann (SUI)	Carrera Jeans–Vagabond	+1' 18"
4	Roberto Visentini (ITA)	Carrera Jeans–Vagabond	+1' 40"
5	Flavio Giupponi (ITA)	Del Tongo–Colnago	+1' 43"
6	Tony Rominger (SUI)	Chateau d'Ax	+2' 08"
7	Jean-François Bernard (FRA)	Toshiba–Look	+2' 11"
8	Erik Breukink (NED)	Panasonic–Isostar–Colnago–Agu	+2' 30"
9	Andrew Hampsten (USA)	7-Eleven–Hoonved	+2' 38"
10	Beat Breu (SUI)	Cyndarella-Isotonic	+2' 48"
