= 1988 Giro d'Italia, Stage 12 to Stage 21b =

Cycling race stages

The 1988 Giro d'Italia was the 71st edition of the Giro d'Italia, one of cycling's Grand Tours. The Giro began in Urbino, with an individual time trial on 23 May, and Stage 12 occurred on 3 June with a stage from Novara. The race finished in Vittorio Veneto on 12 June.

== Stage 12 ==
3 June 1988 — Novara to Selvino, 205 km (127 mi)

Stage 12 result

Rank	Rider	Team	Time
1	Andrew Hampsten (USA)	7-Eleven–Hoonved	5h 53' 10"
2	Pedro Delgado (ESP)	Reynolds	+ 11"
3	Alberto Volpi (ITA)	Gewiss–Bianchi	+ 13"
4	Claudio Vandelli (ITA)	Atala–Ofmega	s.t.
5	Erik Breukink (NED)	Panasonic–Isostar–Colnago–Agu	+ 15"
6	Roberto Conti (ITA)	Selca	s.t.
7	Jean-François Bernard (FRA)	Toshiba–Look	s.t.
8	Roberto Visentini (ITA)	Carrera Jeans–Vagabond	s.t.
9	Marc Madiot (FRA)	Toshiba–Look	s.t.
10	Urs Zimmermann (SUI)	Carrera Jeans–Vagabond	s.t.

General classification after Stage 12

Rank	Rider	Team	Time
1	Franco Chioccioli (ITA)	Del Tongo	61h 00' 27"
2	Urs Zimmermann (SUI)	Carrera Jeans–Vagabond	+ 33"
3	Roberto Visentini (ITA)	Carrera Jeans–Vagabond	+ 55"
4	Flavio Giupponi (ITA)	Del Tongo	+ 1' 10"
5	Andrew Hampsten (USA)	7-Eleven–Hoonved	+ 1' 18"
6	Jean-François Bernard (FRA)	Toshiba–Look	+ 1' 26"
7	Erik Breukink (NED)	Panasonic–Isostar–Colnago–Agu	+ 1' 45"
8	Beat Breu (SUI)	Magniflex-Cyndarella	+ 2' 48"
9	Marco Giovannetti (ITA)	GIS–Ecoflam–Jolly	+ 3' 07"
10	Giuseppe Saronni (ITA)	Del Tongo	+ 3' 25"

== Stage 13 ==
4 June 1988 — Bergamo to Chiesa in Valmalenco, 129 km (80 mi)

Stage 13 result

Rank	Rider	Team	Time
1	Tony Rominger (SUI)	Chateau d'Ax	3h 26' 56"
2	Stefano Giuliani (ITA)	Chateau d'Ax	+ 4' 13"
3	Claudio Vandelli (ITA)	Atala–Ofmega	+ 4' 16"
4	Omar Hernández (COL)	Reynolds	+ 4' 22"
5	Giuseppe Saronni (ITA)	Del Tongo	s.t.
6	Benny Van Brabant (BEL)	Zahor Chocolates	s.t.
7	Massimo Ghirotto (ITA)	Carrera Jeans–Vagabond	s.t.
8	Pedro Delgado (ESP)	Reynolds	s.t.
9	Erik Breukink (NED)	Panasonic–Isostar–Colnago–Agu	s.t.
10	Jean-François Bernard (FRA)	Toshiba–Look	s.t.

General classification after Stage 13

Rank	Rider	Team	Time
1	Franco Chioccioli (ITA)	Del Tongo	64h 31' 45"
2	Urs Zimmermann (SUI)	Carrera Jeans–Vagabond	+ 33"
3	Roberto Visentini (ITA)	Carrera Jeans–Vagabond	+ 55"
4	Flavio Giupponi (ITA)	Del Tongo	+ 1' 10"
5	Andrew Hampsten (USA)	7-Eleven–Hoonved	+ 1' 18"
6	Jean-François Bernard (FRA)	Toshiba–Look	+ 1' 26"
7	Erik Breukink (NED)	Panasonic–Isostar–Colnago–Agu	+ 1' 45"
8	Beat Breu (SUI)	Magniflex-Cyndarella	+ 2' 48"
9	Marco Giovannetti (ITA)	GIS–Ecoflam–Jolly	+ 3' 07"
10	Giuseppe Saronni (ITA)	Del Tongo	+ 3' 25"

== Stage 14 ==
5 June 1988 — Chiesa in Valmalenco to Bormio, 120 km (75 mi)

Stage 14 result

Rank	Rider	Team	Time
1	Erik Breukink (NED)	Panasonic–Isostar–Colnago–Agu	3h 53' 12"
2	Andrew Hampsten (USA)	7-Eleven–Hoonved	+ 7"
3	Stefano Tomasini (ITA)	Fanini–Seven Up	+ 4' 39"
4	Flavio Giupponi (ITA)	Del Tongo	+ 4' 55"
5	Marco Giovannetti (ITA)	GIS–Ecoflam–Jolly	+ 4' 58"
6	Urs Zimmermann (SUI)	Carrera Jeans–Vagabond	+ 5' 02"
7	Franco Chioccioli (ITA)	Del Tongo	+ 5' 04"
8	Peter Winnen (NED)	Panasonic–Isostar–Colnago–Agu	+ 5' 14"
9	Sergio Finazzi (ITA)	Fanini–Seven Up	+ 7' 04"
10	Pedro Delgado (ESP)	Reynolds	+ 7' 08"

General classification after Stage 14

Rank	Rider	Team	Time
1	Andrew Hampsten (USA)	7-Eleven–Hoonved	68h 26' 07"
2	Erik Breukink (NED)	Panasonic–Isostar–Colnago–Agu	+ 15"
3	Franco Chioccioli (ITA)	Del Tongo	+ 3' 54"
4	Urs Zimmermann (SUI)	Carrera Jeans–Vagabond	+ 4' 25"
5	Flavio Giupponi (ITA)	Del Tongo	+ 4' 55"
6	Marco Giovannetti (ITA)	GIS–Ecoflam–Jolly	+ 6' 55"
7	Peter Winnen (NED)	Panasonic–Isostar–Colnago–Agu	+ 8' 23"
8	Stefano Tomasini (ITA)	Fanini–Seven Up	+ 8' 48"
9	Jean-François Bernard (FRA)	Toshiba–Look	+ 9' 37"
10	Beat Breu (SUI)	Magniflex-Cyndarella	+ 10' 19"

== Stage 15 ==
6 June 1988 — Bormio to Merano 2000, 83 km (52 mi)

Stage 15 result

Rank	Rider	Team	Time
1	Jean-François Bernard (FRA)	Toshiba–Look	2h 07' 00"
2	Urs Zimmermann (SUI)	Carrera Jeans–Vagabond	+ 32"
3	Flavio Giupponi (ITA)	Del Tongo	+ 36"
4	Andrew Hampsten (USA)	7-Eleven–Hoonved	+ 51"
5	Erik Breukink (NED)	Panasonic–Isostar–Colnago–Agu	+ 1' 18"
6	Roberto Conti (ITA)	Selca	+ 2' 43"
7	Juan Tomás Martínez (ESP)	Zahor Chocolates	+ 2' 47"
8	Pedro Delgado (ESP)	Reynolds	+ 2' 49"
9	José Luis Laguía (ESP)	Reynolds	+ 3' 02"
10	Franco Vona (ITA)	Chateau d'Ax	+ 3' 13"

General classification after Stage 15

Rank	Rider	Team	Time
1	Andrew Hampsten (USA)	7-Eleven–Hoonved	70h 33' 58"
2	Erik Breukink (NED)	Panasonic–Isostar–Colnago–Agu	+ 42"
3	Urs Zimmermann (SUI)	Carrera Jeans–Vagabond	+ 3' 50"
4	Flavio Giupponi (ITA)	Del Tongo	+ 4' 34"
5	Franco Chioccioli (ITA)	Del Tongo	+ 6' 19"
6	Jean-François Bernard (FRA)	Toshiba–Look	+ 8' 26"
7	Marco Giovannetti (ITA)	GIS–Ecoflam–Jolly	+ 11' 01"
8	Peter Winnen (NED)	Panasonic–Isostar–Colnago–Agu	+ 11' 43"
9	Stefano Tomasini (ITA)	Fanini–Seven Up	+ 12' 31"
10	Pedro Delgado (ESP)	Reynolds	+ 12' 37"

== Stage 16 ==
7 June 1988 — Merano to Innsbruck, 176 km (109 mi)

Stage 16 result

Rank	Rider	Team	Time
1	Franco Vona (ITA)	Chateau d'Ax	5h 07' 07"
2	Marco Vitali (ITA)	Atala–Ofmega	+ 4"
3	Enrico Galleschi (ITA)	Alba Cucine-Benotto	s.t.
4	Marco Giovannetti (ITA)	GIS–Ecoflam–Jolly	s.t.
5	Ennio Vanotti (ITA)	Chateau d'Ax	s.t.
6	Erik Breukink (NED)	Panasonic–Isostar–Colnago–Agu	s.t.
7	Andrew Hampsten (USA)	7-Eleven–Hoonved	s.t.
8	Peter Winnen (NED)	Panasonic–Isostar–Colnago–Agu	s.t.
9	Pedro Delgado (ESP)	Reynolds	s.t.
10	Johan van der Velde (NED)	GIS–Ecoflam–Jolly	+ 12"

General classification after Stage 16

Rank	Rider	Team	Time
1	Andrew Hampsten (USA)	7-Eleven–Hoonved	75h 41' 10"
2	Erik Breukink (NED)	Panasonic–Isostar–Colnago–Agu	+ 42"
3	Urs Zimmermann (SUI)	Carrera Jeans–Vagabond	+ 3' 58"
4	Flavio Giupponi (ITA)	Del Tongo	+ 4' 37"
5	Franco Chioccioli (ITA)	Del Tongo	+ 6' 26"
6	Jean-François Bernard (FRA)	Toshiba–Look	+ 8' 33"
7	Marco Giovannetti (ITA)	GIS–Ecoflam–Jolly	+ 11' 01"
8	Peter Winnen (NED)	Panasonic–Isostar–Colnago–Agu	+ 11' 43"
9	Pedro Delgado (ESP)	Reynolds	+ 12' 37"
10	Stefano Tomasini (ITA)	Fanini–Seven Up	+ 18' 50"

== Stage 17 ==
8 June 1988 — Innsbruck to Borgo Valsugana, 221 km (137 mi)

Stage 17 result

Rank	Rider	Team	Time
1	Patrizio Gambirasio (ITA)	Selca	5h 30' 39"
2	Stefano Allocchio (ITA)	Chateau d'Ax	s.t.
3	Rolf Sørensen (DEN)	Ariostea–Gres	s.t.
4	Johan van der Velde (NED)	GIS–Ecoflam–Jolly	s.t.
5	Paul Popp (AUT)	Malvor–Bottecchia–Sidi	s.t.
6	Flavio Chesini (ITA)	Alba Cucine-Benotto	s.t.
7	Luciano Boffo (ITA)	Alfa Lum–Legnano–Ecoflam	s.t.
8	Fabio Bordonali (ITA)	Carrera Jeans–Vagabond	s.t.
9	Dante Morandi (ITA)	Selca	s.t.
10	Jesús Suárez Cueva (ESP)	Zahor Chocolates	s.t.

General classification after Stage 17

Rank	Rider	Team	Time
1	Andrew Hampsten (USA)	7-Eleven–Hoonved	81h 11' 49"
2	Erik Breukink (NED)	Panasonic–Isostar–Colnago–Agu	+ 42"
3	Urs Zimmermann (SUI)	Carrera Jeans–Vagabond	+ 3' 58"
4	Flavio Giupponi (ITA)	Del Tongo	+ 4' 37"
5	Franco Chioccioli (ITA)	Del Tongo	+ 6' 27"
6	Jean-François Bernard (FRA)	Toshiba–Look	+ 8' 33"
7	Marco Giovannetti (ITA)	GIS–Ecoflam–Jolly	+ 11' 01"
8	Peter Winnen (NED)	Panasonic–Isostar–Colnago–Agu	+ 11' 45"
9	Pedro Delgado (ESP)	Reynolds	+ 12' 37"
10	Stefano Tomasini (ITA)	Fanini–Seven Up	+ 18' 50"

== Stage 18 ==
9 June 1988 — Levico Terme to Valico del Vetriolo, 18 km (11 mi) (ITT)

Stage 18 result

Rank	Rider	Team	Time
1	Andrew Hampsten (USA)	7-Eleven–Hoonved	43' 37"
2	Roberto Visentini (ITA)	Carrera Jeans–Vagabond	+ 32"
3	Flavio Giupponi (ITA)	Del Tongo	+ 40"
4	Urs Zimmermann (SUI)	Carrera Jeans–Vagabond	+ 52"
5	Erik Breukink (NED)	Panasonic–Isostar–Colnago–Agu	+ 1' 04"
6	Tony Rominger (SUI)	Chateau d'Ax	+ 1' 39"
7	Pedro Delgado (ESP)	Reynolds	+ 1' 55"
8	Javier Lukin (ESP)	Reynolds	+ 2' 28"
9	Stefano Tomasini (ITA)	Fanini–Seven Up	+ 2' 31"
10	Roberto Conti (ITA)	Selca	+ 2' 35"

General classification after Stage 18

Rank	Rider	Team	Time
1	Andrew Hampsten (USA)	7-Eleven–Hoonved	81h 54' 06"
2	Erik Breukink (NED)	Panasonic–Isostar–Colnago–Agu	+ 1' 51"
3	Franco Chioccioli (ITA)	Del Tongo	+ 11' 29"
4	Marco Giovannetti (ITA)	GIS–Ecoflam–Jolly	+ 14' 40"
5	Pedro Delgado (ESP)	Reynolds	+ 14' 52"
6	Peter Winnen (NED)	Panasonic–Isostar–Colnago–Agu	+ 14' 57"
7	Urs Zimmermann (SUI)	Carrera Jeans–Vagabond	+ 15' 10"
8	Flavio Giupponi (ITA)	Del Tongo	+ 15' 37"
9	Stefano Tomasini (ITA)	Fanini–Seven Up	+ 21' 41"
10	Claudio Vandelli (ITA)	Atala–Ofmega	+ 25' 06"

== Stage 19 ==
10 June 1988 — Borgo Valsugana to Arta Terme, 233 km (145 mi)

Stage 19 result

Rank	Rider	Team	Time
1	Stefano Giuliani (ITA)	7-Eleven–Hoonved	6h 40' 49"
2	Urs Zimmermann (SUI)	Carrera Jeans–Vagabond	s.t.
3	Roberto Pagnin (ITA)	Gewiss–Bianchi	+ 3' 05"
4	Giuseppe Saronni (ITA)	Del Tongo	+ 3' 06"
5	Renato Piccolo (ITA)	Gewiss–Bianchi	s.t.
6	Marco Vitali (ITA)	Atala–Ofmega	s.t.
7	José Luis Laguía (ESP)	Reynolds	s.t.
8	Massimo Ghirotto (ITA)	Carrera Jeans–Vagabond	s.t.
9	Franco Vona (ITA)	Chateau d'Ax	s.t.
10	Alberto Volpi (ITA)	Gewiss–Bianchi	s.t.

General classification after Stage 19

Rank	Rider	Team	Time
1	Andrew Hampsten (USA)	7-Eleven–Hoonved	88h 38' 01"
2	Urs Zimmermann (SUI)	Carrera Jeans–Vagabond	+ 1' 49"
3	Erik Breukink (NED)	Panasonic–Isostar–Colnago–Agu	+ 2' 06"
4	Flavio Giupponi (ITA)	Del Tongo	+ 5' 27"
5	Franco Chioccioli (ITA)	Del Tongo	+ 11' 29"
6	Marco Giovannetti (ITA)	GIS–Ecoflam–Jolly	+ 14' 40"
7	Pedro Delgado (ESP)	Reynolds	+ 14' 52"
8	Peter Winnen (NED)	Panasonic–Isostar–Colnago–Agu	+ 14' 57"
9	Stefano Tomasini (ITA)	Fanini–Seven Up	+ 21' 41"
10	Claudio Vandelli (ITA)	Atala–Ofmega	+ 25' 06"

== Stage 20 ==
11 June 1988 — Arta Terme to Lido di Jesolo, 212 km (132 mi)

Stage 20 result

Rank	Rider	Team	Time
1	Paolo Rosola (ITA)	Gewiss–Bianchi	5h 51' 33"
2	Alessio Di Basco (ITA)	Fanini–Seven Up	s.t.
3	Johan van der Velde (NED)	GIS–Ecoflam–Jolly	s.t.
4	Urs Freuler (SUI)	Panasonic–Isostar–Colnago–Agu	s.t.
5	Rolf Sørensen (DEN)	Ariostea–Gres	s.t.
6	Silvio Martinello (ITA)	Atala–Ofmega	s.t.
7	Giovanni Strazzer (ITA)	Malvor–Bottecchia–Sidi	s.t.
8	Luciano Boffo (ITA)	Alfa Lum–Legnano–Ecoflam	s.t.
9	Stefano Allocchio (ITA)	Chateau d'Ax	s.t.
10	Paul Popp (AUT)	Malvor–Bottecchia–Sidi	s.t.

General classification after Stage 20

Rank	Rider	Team	Time
1	Andrew Hampsten (USA)	7-Eleven–Hoonved	94h 29' 34"
2	Urs Zimmermann (SUI)	Carrera Jeans–Vagabond	+ 1' 49"
3	Erik Breukink (NED)	Panasonic–Isostar–Colnago–Agu	+ 2' 06"
4	Flavio Giupponi (ITA)	Del Tongo	+ 5' 27"
5	Franco Chioccioli (ITA)	Del Tongo	+ 11' 34"
6	Marco Giovannetti (ITA)	GIS–Ecoflam–Jolly	+ 14' 40"
7	Pedro Delgado (ESP)	Reynolds	+ 14' 52"
8	Peter Winnen (NED)	Panasonic–Isostar–Colnago–Agu	+ 14' 57"
9	Stefano Tomasini (ITA)	Fanini–Seven Up	+ 21' 41"
10	Claudio Vandelli (ITA)	Atala–Ofmega	+ 25' 06"

== Stage 21a ==
12 June 1988 — Lido di Jesolo to Vittorio Veneto, 73 km (45 mi)

Stage 21a result

Rank	Rider	Team	Time
1	Urs Freuler (SUI)	Panasonic–Isostar–Colnago–Agu	1h 52' 18"
2	Alessio Di Basco (ITA)	Fanini–Seven Up	s.t.
3	Jesús Suárez Cueva (ESP)	Zahor Chocolates	s.t.
4	Paul Popp (AUT)	Malvor–Bottecchia–Sidi	s.t.
5	Giovanni Bottoia (ITA)	Chateau d'Ax	s.t.
6	Marco Saligari (ITA)	Ariostea–Gres	s.t.
7	Pierino Gavazzi (ITA)	Fanini–Seven Up	s.t.
8	Rolf Järmann (SUI)	Magniflex-Cyndarella	s.t.
9	Hendrik Redant (BEL)	Mosoca-Isoglass-Galli	s.t.
10	Giuseppe Petito (ITA)	GIS–Ecoflam–Jolly	s.t.

General classification after Stage 21a

Rank	Rider	Team	Time
1	Andrew Hampsten (USA)	7-Eleven–Hoonved	

== Stage 21b ==
12 June 1988 — Vittorio Veneto to Vittorio Veneto, 43 km (27 mi) (ITT)

Stage 21b result

Rank	Rider	Team	Time
1	Lech Piasecki (POL)	Del Tongo	53' 49"
2	Eric Vanderaerden (BEL)	Panasonic–Isostar–Colnago–Agu	+ 47"
3	Tony Rominger (SUI)	Chateau d'Ax	+ 1' 01"
4	Roberto Visentini (ITA)	Carrera Jeans–Vagabond	+ 1' 02"
5	Erik Breukink (NED)	Panasonic–Isostar–Colnago–Agu	+ 1' 41"
6	Roberto Pagnin (ITA)	Gewiss–Bianchi	+ 1' 51"
7	Andrew Hampsten (USA)	7-Eleven–Hoonved	+ 2' 04"
8	Giuseppe Saronni (ITA)	Del Tongo	+ 2' 10"
9	Jörg Müller (SUI)	PDM–Ultima–Concorde	+ 2' 12"
10	Daniel Gisiger (SUI)	Magniflex-Cyndarella	+ 2' 13"

General classification after Stage 21b

Rank	Rider	Team	Time
1	Andrew Hampsten (USA)	7-Eleven–Hoonved	97h 18' 56"
2	Erik Breukink (NED)	Panasonic–Isostar–Colnago–Agu	+ 1' 43"
3	Urs Zimmermann (SUI)	Carrera Jeans–Vagabond	+ 2' 45"
4	Flavio Giupponi (ITA)	Del Tongo	+ 6' 56"
5	Franco Chioccioli (ITA)	Del Tongo	+ 13' 20"
6	Marco Giovannetti (ITA)	GIS–Ecoflam–Jolly	+ 15' 20"
7	Pedro Delgado (ESP)	Reynolds	+ 17' 02"
8	Peter Winnen (NED)	Panasonic–Isostar–Colnago–Agu	+ 18' 14"
9	Stefano Tomasini (ITA)	Fanini–Seven Up	+ 27' 01"
10	Claudio Vandelli (ITA)	Atala–Ofmega	+ 27' 02"
