= 1994 Giro d'Italia, Stage 1a to Stage 11 =

Cycling race stages

The 1994 Giro d'Italia was the 77th edition of the Giro d'Italia, one of cycling's Grand Tours. The Giro began in Bologna, with a flat stage on 22 May, and Stage 11 occurred on 1 June with a stage to Bibione. The race finished in Milan on 12 June.

== Stage 1a ==
22 May 1994 — Bologna to Bologna, 86 km (53 mi)

Stage 1a result

Rank	Rider	Team	Time
1	Endrio Leoni (ITA)	Jolly Componibili–Cage 1994	2h 00' 10"
2	Giovanni Lombardi (ITA)	Lampre–Panaria	s.t.
3	Adriano Baffi (ITA)	Mercatone Uno–Medeghini	s.t.
4	Fabio Baldato (ITA)	GB–MG Maglificio	s.t.
5	Samuele Schiavina (ITA)	Carrera Jeans–Tassoni	s.t.
6	Giovanni Fidanza (ITA)	Team Polti–Vaporetto	s.t.
7	Stefano Zanini (ITA)	Navigare–Blue Storm	s.t.
8	Uwe Raab (GER)	Team Telekom	s.t.
9	Jürgen Werner (GER)	Team Telekom	s.t.
10	Dimitri Konyshev (RUS)	Jolly Componibili–Cage 1994	s.t.

== Stage 1b ==
22 May 1994 — Bologna, 7 km (4.3 mi) (ITT)

Stage 1b result

Rank	Rider	Team	Time
1	Armand de Las Cuevas (FRA)	Castorama	7' 52"
2	Evgeni Berzin (RUS)	Gewiss–Ballan	+ 2"
3	Miguel Induráin (ESP)	Banesto	+ 5"
4	Francesco Casagrande (ITA)	Mercatone Uno–Medeghini	+ 12"
5	Gianni Bugno (ITA)	Team Polti–Vaporetto	+ 14"
6	Moreno Argentin (ITA)	Gewiss–Ballan	+ 17"
7	Rolf Sørensen (DEN)	GB–MG Maglificio	+ 21"
8	Thierry Marie (FRA)	Castorama	+ 22"
9	Andrea Chiurato (ITA)	Mapei–CLAS	+ 23"
10	Massimiliano Lelli (ITA)	Mercatone Uno–Medeghini	s.t.

General classification after Stage 1b

Rank	Rider	Team	Time
1	Armand de Las Cuevas (FRA)	Castorama	2h 08' 13"
2	Evgeni Berzin (RUS)	Gewiss–Ballan	+ 2"
3	Miguel Induráin (ESP)	Banesto	+ 5"
4	Adriano Baffi (ITA)	Mercatone Uno–Medeghini	s.t.
5	Francesco Casagrande (ITA)	Mercatone Uno–Medeghini	+ 12"
6	Gianni Bugno (ITA)	Team Polti–Vaporetto	+ 14"
7	Max Sciandri (ITA)	GB–MG Maglificio	+ 16"
8	Moreno Argentin (ITA)	Gewiss–Ballan	+ 17"
9	Endrio Leoni (ITA)	Jolly Componibili–Cage 1994	+ 20"
10	Rolf Sørensen (DEN)	GB–MG Maglificio	+ 21"

== Stage 2 ==
23 May 1994 — Bologna to Osimo, 232 km (144 mi)

Stage 2 result

Rank	Rider	Team	Time
1	Moreno Argentin (ITA)	Gewiss–Ballan	6h 13' 31"
2	Andrea Ferrigato (ITA)	ZG Mobili	+ 6"
3	Davide Rebellin (ITA)	GB–MG Maglificio	+ 8"
4	Francesco Casagrande (ITA)	Mercatone Uno–Medeghini	+ 12"
5	Pascal Richard (SUI)	GB–MG Maglificio	s.t.
6	Giorgio Furlan (ITA)	Gewiss–Ballan	s.t.
7	Stefano Della Santa (ITA)	Mapei–CLAS	s.t.
8	Evgeni Berzin (RUS)	Gewiss–Ballan	s.t.
9	Gianni Bugno (ITA)	Team Polti–Vaporetto	s.t.
10	Marco Pantani (ITA)	Carrera Jeans–Tassoni	s.t.

General classification after Stage 2

Rank	Rider	Team	Time
1	Moreno Argentin (ITA)	Gewiss–Ballan	8h 21' 49"
2	Evgeni Berzin (RUS)	Gewiss–Ballan	+ 9"
3	Armand de Las Cuevas (FRA)	Castorama	+ 10"
4	Miguel Induráin (ESP)	Banesto	+ 15"
5	Francesco Casagrande (ITA)	Mercatone Uno–Medeghini	+ 19"
6	Gianni Bugno (ITA)	Team Polti–Vaporetto	+ 21"
7	Andrea Ferrigato (ITA)	ZG Mobili	+ 32"
8	Pascal Richard (SUI)	GB–MG Maglificio	+ 40"
9	Marco Giovannetti (ITA)	Mapei–CLAS	+ 41"
10	Wladimir Belli (ITA)	Lampre–Panaria	+ 42"

== Stage 3 ==
24 May 1994 — Osimo to Loreto Aprutino, 185 km (115 mi)

Stage 3 result

Rank	Rider	Team	Time
1	Gianni Bugno (ITA)	Team Polti–Vaporetto	4h 25' 20"
2	Stefano Zanini (ITA)	Navigare–Blue Storm	+ 2"
3	Davide Rebellin (ITA)	GB–MG Maglificio	s.t.
4	Francesco Casagrande (ITA)	Mercatone Uno–Medeghini	s.t.
5	Miguel Induráin (ESP)	Banesto	s.t.
6	Evgeni Berzin (RUS)	Gewiss–Ballan	s.t.
7	Armand de Las Cuevas (FRA)	Castorama	s.t.
8	Claudio Chiappucci (ITA)	Carrera Jeans–Tassoni	s.t.
9	Stefano Della Santa (ITA)	Mapei–CLAS	s.t.
10	Wladimir Belli (ITA)	Lampre–Panaria	s.t.

General classification after Stage 3

Rank	Rider	Team	Time
1	Moreno Argentin (ITA)	Gewiss–Ballan	12h 47' 11"
2	Gianni Bugno (ITA)	Team Polti–Vaporetto	+ 7"
3	Evgeni Berzin (RUS)	Gewiss–Ballan	+ 9"
4	Armand de Las Cuevas (FRA)	Castorama	+ 10"
5	Miguel Induráin (ESP)	Banesto	+ 15"
6	Francesco Casagrande (ITA)	Mercatone Uno–Medeghini	+ 19"
7	Andrea Ferrigato (ITA)	ZG Mobili	+ 32"
8	Stefano Zanini (ITA)	Navigare–Blue Storm	+ 34"
9	Pascal Richard (SUI)	GB–MG Maglificio	+ 40"
10	Marco Giovannetti (ITA)	Mapei–CLAS	+ 41"

== Stage 4 ==
25 May 1994 — Montesilvano to Campitello Matese, 204 km (127 mi)

Stage 4 result

Rank	Rider	Team	Time
1	Evgeni Berzin (RUS)	Gewiss–Ballan	5h 33' 37"
2	Oscar Pelliccioli (ITA)	Team Polti–Vaporetto	s.t.
3	Wladimir Belli (ITA)	Lampre–Panaria	+ 17"
4	Davide Rebellin (ITA)	GB–MG Maglificio	+ 47"
5	Marco Pantani (ITA)	Carrera Jeans–Tassoni	s.t.
6	Stefano Della Santa (ITA)	Mapei–CLAS	s.t.
7	Marco Giovannetti (ITA)	Mapei–CLAS	s.t.
8	Pavel Tonkov (RUS)	Lampre–Panaria	s.t.
9	Gianni Bugno (ITA)	Team Polti–Vaporetto	s.t.
10	Armand de Las Cuevas (FRA)	Castorama	s.t.

General classification after Stage 4

Rank	Rider	Team	Time
1	Evgeni Berzin (RUS)	Gewiss–Ballan	18h 20' 45"
2	Gianni Bugno (ITA)	Team Polti–Vaporetto	+ 57"
3	Wladimir Belli (ITA)	Lampre–Panaria	+ 58"
4	Armand de Las Cuevas (FRA)	Castorama	+ 1' 00"
5	Miguel Induráin (ESP)	Banesto	+ 1' 05"
6	Oscar Pelliccioli (ITA)	Team Polti–Vaporetto	+ 1' 08"
7	Marco Giovannetti (ITA)	Mapei–CLAS	+ 1' 31"
8	Stefano Della Santa (ITA)	Mapei–CLAS	+ 1' 32"
9	Pavel Tonkov (RUS)	Lampre–Panaria	+ 1' 33"
10	Marco Pantani (ITA)	Carrera Jeans–Tassoni	+ 1' 43"

== Stage 5 ==
26 May 1994 — Campobasso to Melfi, 158 km (98 mi)

Stage 5 result

Rank	Rider	Team	Time
1	Endrio Leoni (ITA)	Jolly Componibili–Cage 1994	3h 41' 39"
2	Fabio Baldato (ITA)	GB–MG Maglificio	s.t.
3	Giovanni Lombardi (ITA)	Lampre–Panaria	s.t.
4	Alessio Di Basco (ITA)	Amore & Vita–Galatron	s.t.
5	Miguel Induráin (ESP)	Banesto	s.t.
6	Massimo Strazzer (ITA)	Navigare–Blue Storm	s.t.
7	Uwe Raab (GER)	Team Telekom	s.t.
8	Dimitri Konyshev (RUS)	Jolly Componibili–Cage 1994	s.t.
9	Samuele Schiavina (ITA)	Carrera Jeans–Tassoni	s.t.
10	Max Sciandri (ITA)	GB–MG Maglificio	s.t.

General classification after Stage 5

Rank	Rider	Team	Time
1	Evgeni Berzin (RUS)	Gewiss–Ballan	22h 02' 24"
2	Gianni Bugno (ITA)	Team Polti–Vaporetto	+ 57"
3	Armand de Las Cuevas (FRA)	Castorama	+ 1' 00"
4	Miguel Induráin (ESP)	Banesto	+ 1' 05"
5	Wladimir Belli (ITA)	Lampre–Panaria	+ 1' 26"
6	Marco Giovannetti (ITA)	Mapei–CLAS	+ 1' 31"
7	Stefano Della Santa (ITA)	Mapei–CLAS	+ 1' 32"
8	Oscar Pelliccioli (ITA)	Team Polti–Vaporetto	+ 1' 36"
9	Marco Pantani (ITA)	Carrera Jeans–Tassoni	+ 1' 43"
10	Andrew Hampsten (USA)	Motorola	+ 1' 53"

== Stage 6 ==
27 May 1994 — Potenza to Caserta, 215 km (134 mi)

Stage 6 result

Rank	Rider	Team	Time
1	Marco Saligari (ITA)	GB–MG Maglificio	5h 39' 38"
2	Massimo Ghirotto (ITA)	ZG Mobili	s.t.
3	Heinz Imboden (SUI)	Brescialat–Ceramiche Refin	s.t.
4	Ivan Gotti (ITA)	Team Polti–Vaporetto	s.t.
5	Gianni Faresin (ITA)	Lampre–Panaria	s.t.
6	Gianluca Pierobon (ITA)	Amore & Vita–Galatron	+ 3' 01"
7	Djamolidine Abdoujaparov (UZB)	Team Polti–Vaporetto	s.t.
8	Alessio Di Basco (ITA)	Amore & Vita–Galatron	s.t.
9	Michele Bartoli (ITA)	Mercatone Uno–Medeghini	s.t.
10	Ján Svorada (SVK)	Lampre–Panaria	s.t.

General classification after Stage 6

Rank	Rider	Team	Time
1	Evgeni Berzin (RUS)	Gewiss–Ballan	27h 45' 03"
2	Gianni Bugno (ITA)	Team Polti–Vaporetto	+ 57"
3	Armand de Las Cuevas (FRA)	Castorama	+ 1' 00"
4	Miguel Induráin (ESP)	Banesto	+ 1' 05"
5	Wladimir Belli (ITA)	Lampre–Panaria	+ 1' 26"
6	Marco Giovannetti (ITA)	Mapei–CLAS	+ 1' 31"
7	Stefano Della Santa (ITA)	Mapei–CLAS	+ 1' 32"
8	Oscar Pelliccioli (ITA)	Team Polti–Vaporetto	+ 1' 36"
9	Marco Pantani (ITA)	Carrera Jeans–Tassoni	+ 1' 43"
10	Andrew Hampsten (USA)	Motorola	+ 1' 53"

== Stage 7 ==
28 May 1994 — Fiuggi to Fiuggi, 119 km (74 mi)

Stage 7 result

Rank	Rider	Team	Time
1	Laudelino Cubino (ESP)	Kelme–Avianca–Gios	2h 56' 12"
2	Michele Coppolillo (ITA)	Navigare–Blue Storm	+ 1"
3	Fabian Jeker (SUI)	Castorama	s.t.
4	Fabio Bordonali (ITA)	Brescialat–Ceramiche Refin	s.t.
5	Roberto Pelliconi (ITA)	Brescialat–Ceramiche Refin	s.t.
6	Andrea Chiurato (ITA)	Mapei–CLAS	s.t.
7	Michele Bartoli (ITA)	Mercatone Uno–Medeghini	+ 10"
8	Andrea Ferrigato (ITA)	ZG Mobili	s.t.
9	Alessio Di Basco (ITA)	Amore & Vita–Galatron	s.t.
10	Gianni Bugno (ITA)	Team Polti–Vaporetto	s.t.

General classification after Stage 7

Rank	Rider	Team	Time
1	Evgeni Berzin (RUS)	Gewiss–Ballan	30h 41' 25"
2	Gianni Bugno (ITA)	Team Polti–Vaporetto	+ 57"
3	Armand de Las Cuevas (FRA)	Castorama	+ 1' 00"
4	Miguel Induráin (ESP)	Banesto	+ 1' 05"
5	Wladimir Belli (ITA)	Lampre–Panaria	+ 1' 26"
6	Oscar Pelliccioli (ITA)	Team Polti–Vaporetto	+ 1' 27"
7	Marco Giovannetti (ITA)	Mapei–CLAS	+ 1' 31"
8	Stefano Della Santa (ITA)	Mapei–CLAS	+ 1' 32"
9	Marco Pantani (ITA)	Carrera Jeans–Tassoni	+ 1' 43"
10	Andrew Hampsten (USA)	Motorola	+ 1' 53"

== Stage 8 ==
29 May 1994 — Grosseto to Follonica, 44 km (27 mi) (ITT)

Stage 8 result

Rank	Rider	Team	Time
1	Evgeni Berzin (RUS)	Gewiss–Ballan	50' 46"
2	Armand de Las Cuevas (FRA)	Castorama	+ 1' 16"
3	Gianni Bugno (ITA)	Team Polti–Vaporetto	+ 1' 41"
4	Miguel Induráin (ESP)	Banesto	+ 2' 34"
5	Massimiliano Lelli (ITA)	Mercatone Uno–Medeghini	+ 2' 39"
6	Piotr Ugrumov (UKR)	Gewiss–Ballan	+ 2' 48"
7	Marco Giovannetti (ITA)	Mapei–CLAS	+ 2' 49"
8	Francesco Casagrande (ITA)	Mercatone Uno–Medeghini	+ 2' 55"
9	Massimo Podenzana (ITA)	Navigare–Blue Storm	+ 3' 11"
10	Moreno Argentin (ITA)	Gewiss–Ballan	+ 3' 19"

General classification after Stage 8

Rank	Rider	Team	Time
1	Evgeni Berzin (RUS)	Gewiss–Ballan	31h 32' 11"
2	Armand de Las Cuevas (FRA)	Castorama	+ 2' 16"
3	Gianni Bugno (ITA)	Team Polti–Vaporetto	+ 2' 38"
4	Miguel Induráin (ESP)	Banesto	+ 3' 39"
5	Marco Giovannetti (ITA)	Mapei–CLAS	+ 4' 20"
6	Francesco Casagrande (ITA)	Mercatone Uno–Medeghini	+ 5' 02"
7	Wladimir Belli (ITA)	Lampre–Panaria	+ 5' 24"
8	Pavel Tonkov (RUS)	Lampre–Panaria	+ 6' 09"
9	Stefano Della Santa (ITA)	Mapei–CLAS	+ 6' 19"
10	Massimo Podenzana (ITA)	Navigare–Blue Storm	+ 6' 25"

== Stage 9 ==
30 May 1994 — Castiglione della Pescaia to Pontedera, 153 km (95 mi)

Stage 9 result

Rank	Rider	Team	Time
1	Ján Svorada (SVK)	Lampre–Panaria	3h 25' 07"
2	Endrio Leoni (ITA)	Jolly Componibili–Cage 1994	s.t.
3	Giovanni Fidanza (ITA)	Team Polti–Vaporetto	s.t.
4	Jan Schur (GER)	Motorola	s.t.
5	Uwe Raab (GER)	Team Telekom	s.t.
6	Stefano Zanini (ITA)	Navigare–Blue Storm	s.t.
7	Max Sciandri (ITA)	GB–MG Maglificio	s.t.
8	Fabio Baldato (ITA)	GB–MG Maglificio	s.t.
9	Maurizio Molinari (ITA)	Amore & Vita–Galatron	s.t.
10	Miguel Induráin (ESP)	Banesto	s.t.

General classification after Stage 9

Rank	Rider	Team	Time
1	Evgeni Berzin (RUS)	Gewiss–Ballan	34h 57' 18"
2	Armand de Las Cuevas (FRA)	Castorama	+ 2' 16"
3	Gianni Bugno (ITA)	Team Polti–Vaporetto	+ 2' 38"
4	Miguel Induráin (ESP)	Banesto	+ 3' 39"
5	Marco Giovannetti (ITA)	Mapei–CLAS	+ 4' 20"
6	Francesco Casagrande (ITA)	Mercatone Uno–Medeghini	+ 5' 02"
7	Wladimir Belli (ITA)	Lampre–Panaria	+ 5' 24"
8	Pavel Tonkov (RUS)	Lampre–Panaria	+ 6' 09"
9	Stefano Della Santa (ITA)	Mapei–CLAS	+ 6' 19"
10	Massimo Podenzana (ITA)	Navigare–Blue Storm	+ 6' 25"

== Stage 10 ==
31 May 1994 — Marostica to Marostica, 115 km (71 mi)

Stage 10 result

Rank	Rider	Team	Time
1	Djamolidine Abdoujaparov (UZB)	Team Polti–Vaporetto	2h 33' 07"
2	Giovanni Lombardi (ITA)	Lampre–Panaria	s.t.
3	Fabio Baldato (ITA)	GB–MG Maglificio	s.t.
4	Roberto Pagnin (ITA)	Navigare–Blue Storm	s.t.
5	Andrea Ferrigato (ITA)	ZG Mobili	s.t.
6	Rolf Sørensen (DEN)	GB–MG Maglificio	s.t.
7	Mario Chiesa (ITA)	Carrera Jeans–Tassoni	s.t.
8	Franco Chioccioli (ITA)	Mercatone Uno–Medeghini	s.t.
9	Fabio Bordonali (ITA)	Brescialat–Ceramiche Refin	s.t.
10	Gianni Bugno (ITA)	Team Polti–Vaporetto	s.t.

General classification after Stage 10

Rank	Rider	Team	Time
1	Evgeni Berzin (RUS)	Gewiss–Ballan	37h 30' 31"
2	Armand de Las Cuevas (FRA)	Castorama	+ 2' 16"
3	Gianni Bugno (ITA)	Team Polti–Vaporetto	+ 2' 32"
4	Miguel Induráin (ESP)	Banesto	+ 3' 39"
5	Marco Giovannetti (ITA)	Mapei–CLAS	+ 4' 58"
6	Francesco Casagrande (ITA)	Mercatone Uno–Medeghini	+ 5' 02"
7	Wladimir Belli (ITA)	Lampre–Panaria	+ 5' 24"
8	Pavel Tonkov (RUS)	Lampre–Panaria	+ 6' 09"
9	Massimo Podenzana (ITA)	Navigare–Blue Storm	+ 6' 25"
10	Moreno Argentin (ITA)	Gewiss–Ballan	+ 6' 42"

== Stage 11 ==
1 June 1994 — Marostica to Bibione, 165 km (103 mi)

Stage 11 result

Rank	Rider	Team	Time
1	Ján Svorada (SVK)	Lampre–Panaria	4h 08' 05"
2	Djamolidine Abdoujaparov (UZB)	Team Polti–Vaporetto	s.t.
3	Uwe Raab (GER)	Team Telekom	s.t.
4	Max Sciandri (ITA)	GB–MG Maglificio	s.t.
5	Alessio Di Basco (ITA)	Amore & Vita–Galatron	s.t.
6	Giovanni Fidanza (ITA)	Team Polti–Vaporetto	s.t.
7	Fabiano Fontanelli (ITA)	ZG Mobili	s.t.
8	Adriano Baffi (ITA)	Mercatone Uno–Medeghini	s.t.
9	Roberto Pelliconi (ITA)	Brescialat–Ceramiche Refin	s.t.
10	Michele Bartoli (ITA)	Mercatone Uno–Medeghini	s.t.

General classification after Stage 11

Rank	Rider	Team	Time
1	Evgeni Berzin (RUS)	Gewiss–Ballan	41h 38' 36"
2	Armand de Las Cuevas (FRA)	Castorama	+ 2' 16"
3	Gianni Bugno (ITA)	Team Polti–Vaporetto	+ 2' 32"
4	Miguel Induráin (ESP)	Banesto	+ 3' 39"
5	Marco Giovannetti (ITA)	Mapei–CLAS	+ 4' 58"
6	Francesco Casagrande (ITA)	Mercatone Uno–Medeghini	+ 5' 02"
7	Wladimir Belli (ITA)	Lampre–Panaria	+ 5' 24"
8	Pavel Tonkov (RUS)	Lampre–Panaria	+ 6' 09"
9	Massimo Podenzana (ITA)	Navigare–Blue Storm	+ 6' 25"
10	Moreno Argentin (ITA)	Gewiss–Ballan	+ 6' 42"
