= 1988 Giro del Trentino =

Race details
- Dates: 4–6 May 1988
- Stages: 3
- Distance: 595.9 km (370.3 mi)
- Winning time: 15h 42' 02"

Results
	Winner	Urs Zimmermann (SUI)
	Second	Tony Rominger (SUI)
	Third	Helmut Wechselberger (AUT)

The 1988 Giro del Trentino was the 12th edition of the Tour of the Alps cycle race and was held on 4 May to 6 May 1988. The race started in Torbole and finished in Riva del Garda. The race was won by Urs Zimmermann.

== General classification ==
Final general classification

Rank	Rider	Time
1	Urs Zimmermann (SUI)	15h 42' 02"
2	Tony Rominger (SUI)	+ 7"
3	Helmut Wechselberger (AUT)	+ 46"
4	Gianbattista Baronchelli (ITA)	+ 51"
5	Maurizio Vandelli (ITA)	+ 53"
6	Marco Giovannetti (ITA)	+ 54"
7	Roberto Conti (ITA)	+ 1' 07"
8	Stefano Tomasini (ITA)	+ 1' 26"
9	Silvano Contini (ITA)	+ 1' 26"
10	Gianni Bugno (ITA)	+ 1' 27"
