= 1988 Giro d'Italia =

- Map of the 1988 Giro d'Italia route, from Urbino to Vittorio Veneto (stage courses in red, and connections between host towns in green)

Race details
- Dates: 23 May – 12 June 1988
- Stages: 21, including two split stages
- Distance: 3,579 km (2,224 mi)
- Winning time: 97h 18' 56"

Results
Jersey awarded to the overall winner	Winner	Andrew Hampsten (USA)	(7-Eleven–Hoonved)
	Second	Erik Breukink (NED)	(Panasonic–Isostar–Colnago–Agu)
	Third	Urs Zimmermann (SUI)	(Carrera Jeans–Vagabond)
Jersey awarded to the points classification winner	Points	Johan van der Velde (NED)	(Gisgelati–Ecoflam)
Jersey awarded to the mountains classification winner	Mountains	Andrew Hampsten (USA)	(7-Eleven–Hoonved)
Jersey awarded to the youth classification winner	Youth	Stefano Tomasini (ITA)	(Fanini–Seven Up)
Jersey awarded to the combination classification winner	Combination	Andrew Hampsten (USA)	(7-Eleven–Hoonved)
	Sprints	Alessio Di Basco (ITA)	(Fanini–Seven Up)
	Team	Carrera Jeans–Vagabond	

The 1988 Giro d'Italia was the 71st running of the Giro d'Italia, one of cycling's Grand Tour races. The race started in Urbino, on 23 May, with a 9 km (5.6 mi) individual time trial and concluded in Vittorio Veneto, on 12 June, with a 43 km (26.7 mi) individual time trial. A total of 180 riders from 20 teams entered the 21-stage race, which was won by American Andrew Hampsten of the 7-Eleven–Hoonved team. The second and third places were taken by Dutchman Erik Breukink and Swiss Urs Zimmermann, respectively. It was the third time – and second successive year – in the history of the Giro that the podium was occupied solely by non-Italian riders.

In the first half of the race, the overall classification had been headed for several days by Massimo Podenzana. He had participated in a breakaway during stage 4a, which won him sufficient time to hold the race leader's maglia rosa (English: pink jersey) for more than a week. Franco Chioccioli then wore the pink jersey for two stages before Hampsten took the general classification lead after the fourteenth stage. The fourteenth stage of the 1988 Giro, conducted in adverse weather including a snowstorm, has been recognized as an iconic event in the history of the Giro. After this stage, Hampsten began to build up a solid two-minute barrier against the second-placed rider, Breukink. This gap was sufficient to win Hampsten the race, despite losing around twenty seconds in the final two stages.

Hampsten became the first American, and non-European, to win the Giro. He also won the secondary mountains and combination classifications, as well as the special sprints classification. In the other classifications, Fanini–Seven Up rider Stefano Tomasini of Italy placed ninth overall to finish as the best neo-professional in the general classification, Johan van der Velde of the Gisgelati–Ecoflam team was the winner of the points classification, and Carrera Jeans–Vagabond finished as the winners of the team classification.

== Teams ==
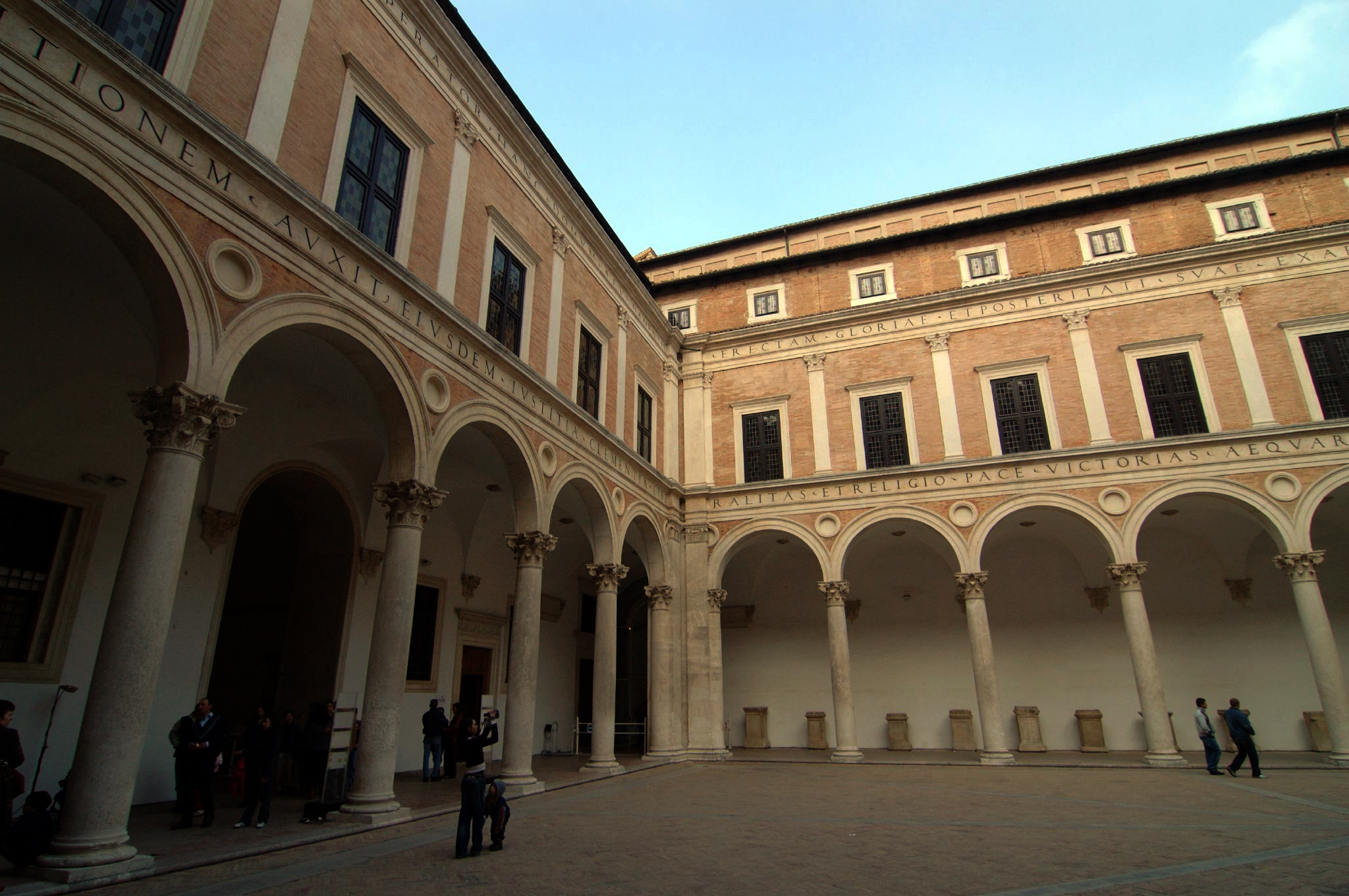
The courtyard of the Ducal Palace in Urbino hosted the team presentation ceremony on 22 May.

Twenty teams were invited by the race organizers to participate in the 1988 edition of the Giro d'Italia, twelve of which were based outside of Italy. Each team sent a squad of nine riders, which meant that the race started with a peloton of 180 cyclists. In total, 82 of the starters were foreign, while the remaining 98 were Italian. Aside from Italy, Switzerland (17), Spain (12), and the Netherlands (11) all had more than 10 riders.

Of those starting, 54 were riding the Giro d'Italia for the first time. The average age of riders was 26.94 years, ranging from 21–year–old Angelo Lecchi from Del Tongo–Colnago to 37–year–old Pierino Gavazzi of Fanini–Seven Up. The team with the youngest average rider age was Selca–Ciclolinea (25), while the oldest was Panasonic–Isostar–Colnago–Agu (29). The presentation of the teams – where each team's roster and manager were introduced in front of the media and local dignitaries – took place on 22 May, in the courtyard of the Ducal Palace in Urbino. From the riders that began the race, 125 made it to the finish in Vittorio Veneto.

The teams entering the race were:

- Alba Cucine–Benotto
- Alfa Lum–Legnano
- Atala–Ofmega
- Carrera Jeans–Vagabond
- Ceramiche Ariostea
- Chateau d'Ax
- Cyndarella–Isotonic
- Del Tongo–Colnago
- Fanini–Seven Up
- Gewiss–Bianchi
- Gisgelati–Ecoflam
- Isoglass–Galli
- Malvor–Bottecchia
- Panasonic–Isostar–Colnago–Agu
- PDM–Ultima–Concorde
- Reynolds
- Selca–Ciclolinea
- 7-Eleven–Hoonved
- Toshiba–Look
- Tokke Zahor

== Pre-race favorites ==
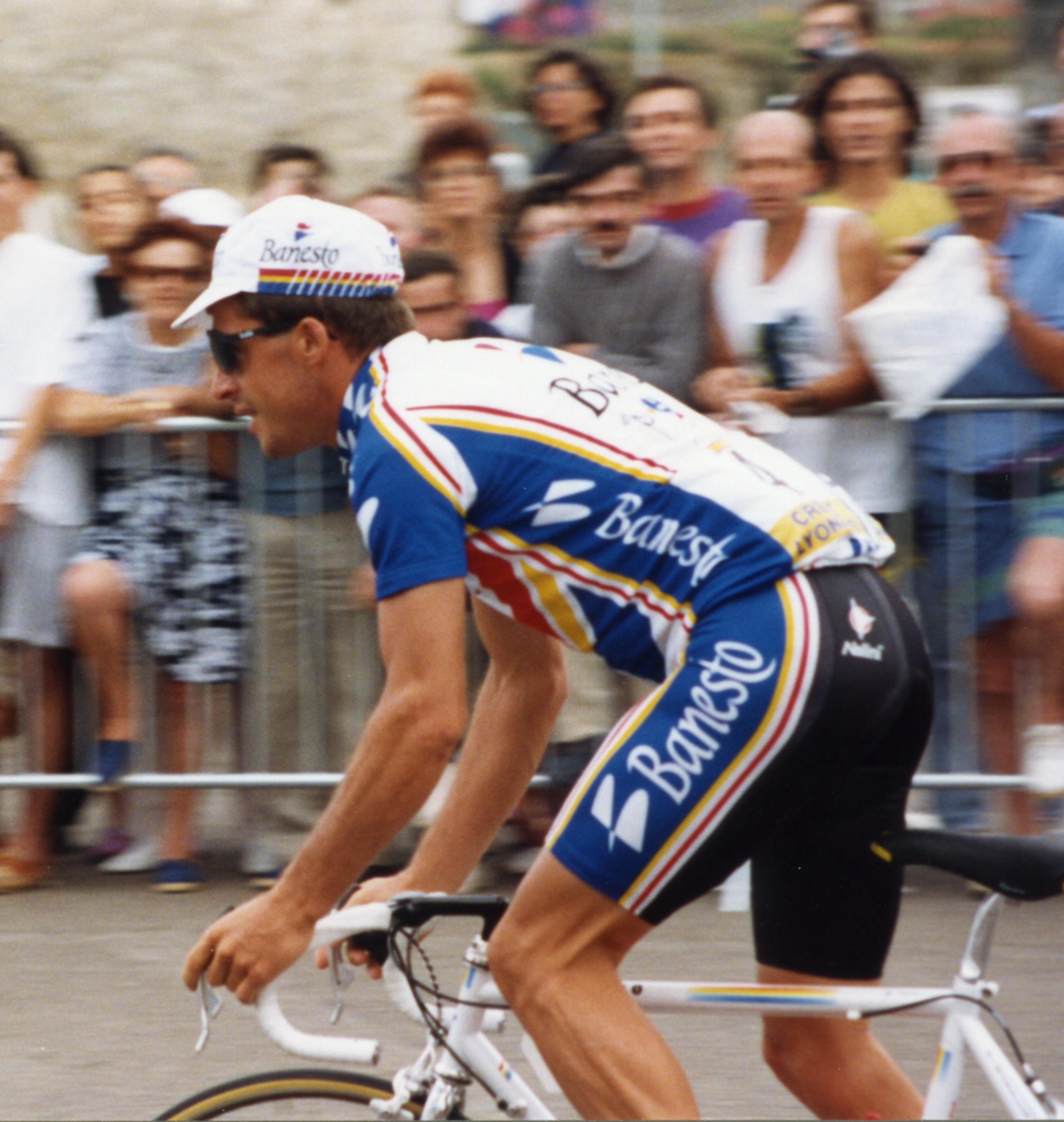
Spanish rider Pedro Delgado (pictured here on the Tour de France in 1993) was seen as a contender for the overall race.

The starting peloton did not include the 1987 winner, Stephen Roche, who was sidelined for the majority of the 1988 season with a knee injury. l'Unità writer Gino Sala, author Bill McGann and an El Mundo Deportivo writer named several riders as contenders for the overall classification, including Andrew Hampsten, Urs Zimmermann, Erik Breukink, Franco Chioccioli, and Pedro Delgado. Sala believed Jean-François Bernard came into the Giro in great shape and that the French rider could win the race if he could do well in the time trials and the mountains. In addition, Bernard Hinault told Sala that if Jean Francois could do well in this edition of the Giro, he could one day lead a team in the Tour de France. Former Giro champion Gianni Motta thought Hampsten would win because of the effort he was expected to make on the Gavia Pass stage. Motta believed that Hampsten would excel there, while the Italian riders – the majority of the peloton – would not because they did not realize its difficulty and thought the Gavia was "just another climb".

The 1986 Tour de France winner Greg LeMond entered the race with his PDM–Ultima–Concorde squad, after a break from cycling due to injuries sustained in a hunting accident. Due to this, Sala did not see him as a front-runner for the overall victory. Swiss rider Tony Rominger also partook in the race and was considered by McGann and Sala as a dark-horse candidate for the victory after experiencing success at the beginning of his season. Guido Bontempi was seen by Sala as a favorite to win a couple of stages. Before he injured his right knee earlier in the season during the Tour de Romandie, many newspapers also believed Moreno Argentin to be a favorite to take several stages. Stampa Sera writer Curzio Maltese believed that Flavio Giupponi could take one of the stages containing many categorized climbs which award mountains classification points, if properly supported by his team Del Tongo–Colnago.

During the presentation of the teams, the riders were asked to choose their top picks for the overall victory. Roberto Visentini garnered the most votes from his fellow riders, but Delgado, Hampsten and LeMond also received many votes. Many media outlets felt that the overall victory would likely go to a non-Italian rider due to the lack of Italian general classification competitors, but that Visentini had the best chance of winning out of competing Italians.

== Route and stages ==
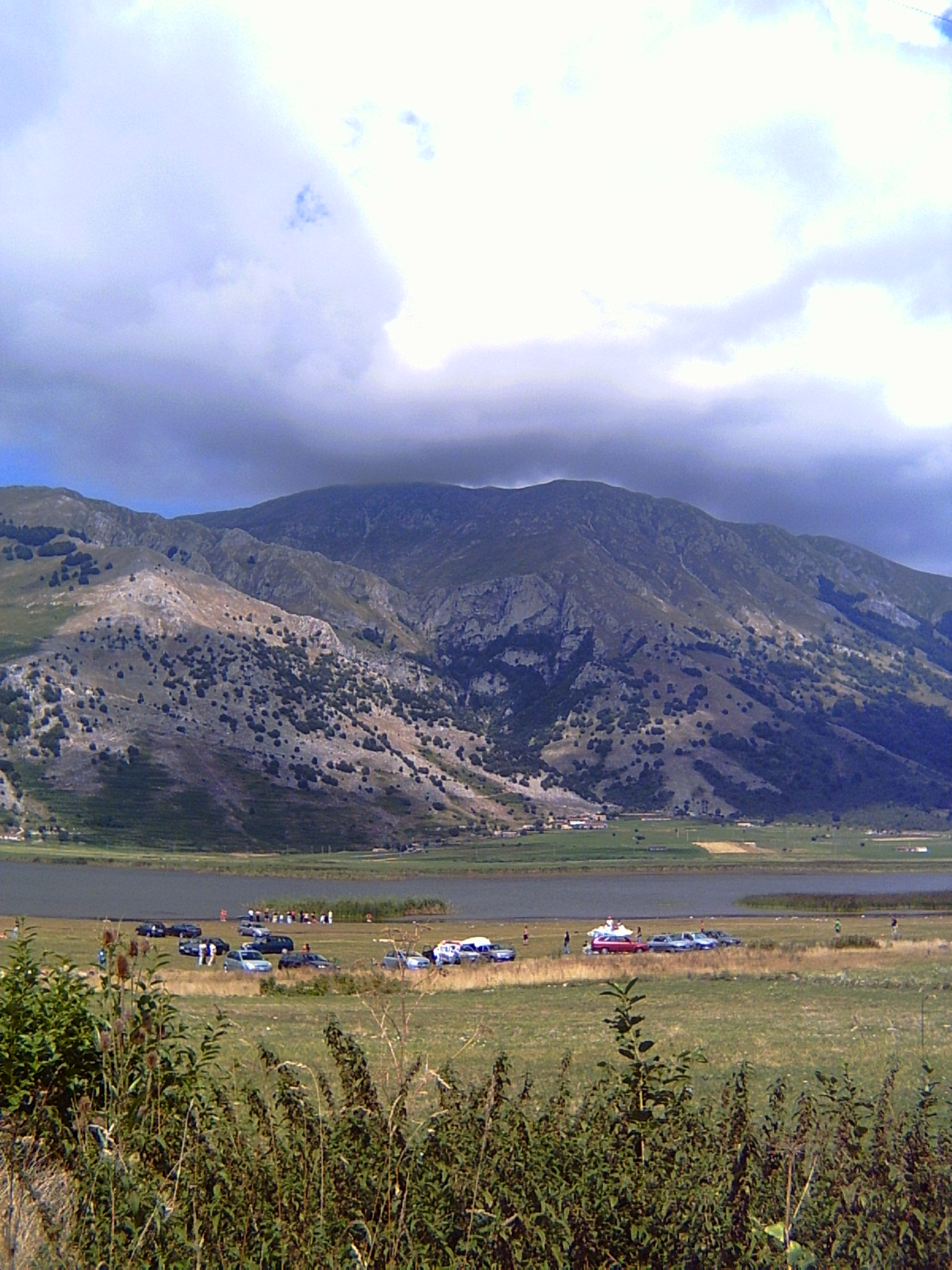
Campitello Matese hosted the end of the 137 km (85 mi) sixth stage and the start of the 178 km (111 mi) seventh stage.

The route for the 1988 edition of the Giro d'Italia was revealed to the public on television by head organizer Vincenzo Torriani, on 5 March 1988. It contained four time trial events, three of which were individual and one a team event. The race organizers hoped that the number of time trials, including one on the last day, would keep the race hotly contested to the end. There were fifteen stages containing thirty categorized climbs, of which four had summit finishes: stage 6, to Campitello Matese; stage 12, to Selvino; stage 13, to Chiesa in Valmalenco; and stage 15, to the Merano 2000 mountain. Another stage with a mountain-top finish was stage 18, which consisted of a climbing time trial to Valico del Vetriolo. The organizers chose to not include any rest days. When compared to the previous year's race, the race was 336 km (209 mi) shorter, contained one fewer rest day and individual time trial, and lacked a prologue. In addition, this race contained one fewer stage, but one more set of half stages. The race was televised in parts of Europe by Italy's national public broadcasting service, RAI.

The eleventh stage between Parma and Colle Don Bosco was cancelled due to protests near the finish line. The fifteenth stage was originally intended to be 132 km (82.0 mi) and to start in Bormio. However, due to very poor weather conditions, the start was moved to Spondigna and the stage was shortened to 83 km (51.6 mi). The route originally had the riders crossing the Stelvio Pass, but it was skipped due to snowdrifts that had developed on the roads. Excluding the finish on the Merano 2000, the stage was relatively flat after the adjustments.

In previous years, the organizers had made the race easier for the Italian favorites by including fewer hard climbs. With the absence of Italian Francesco Moser from this edition, the race organizers included many famous and difficult climbs, such as the Gavia Pass. Moser himself stated that the route contained many difficult climbs and was not helping Italian cycling to prosper at a time when he believed it to be ailing. When asked about the route for the 1988 edition, 7-Eleven–Hoonved rider Bob Roll said "Those sons of bitches put every mountain they could find in the race that year." Three-time winner Gino Bartali also believed the route to be very difficult and in favor of non-Italian competitors. Gino Sala also felt the route was harsher than in years past and that the team time trial could influence the overall classification greatly. La Stampa writer Gian Paolo Ormezzano praised the route saying it was beautiful and well crafted but contained one flaw, in that the race did not finish in any major Italian city. He also expressed his delight with the uphill time trial to Valico del Vetriolo as well as the inclusion of the Stelvio, Rombo and Gavia mountain passes.

Stage characteristics and winners
Stage	Date	Course	Distance	Type	Winner
1	23 May	Urbino	9 km (6 mi)	Individual time trial	Jean-François Bernard (FRA)
2	24 May	Urbino to Ascoli Piceno	230 km (143 mi)	Stage with mountain(s)	Guido Bontempi (ITA)
3	25 May	Ascoli Piceno to Vasto	184 km (114 mi)	Stage with mountain(s)	Stephan Joho (SUI)
4a	26 May	Vasto to Rodi Garganico	123 km (76 mi)	Plain stage	Massimo Podenzana (ITA)
4b	26 May	Rodi Garganico to Vieste	40 km (25 mi)	Team time trial	Del Tongo–Colnago
5	27 May	Vieste to Santa Maria Capua Vetere	260 km (162 mi)	Stage with mountain(s)	Guido Bontempi (ITA)
6	28 May	Santa Maria Capua Vetere to Campitello Matese	137 km (85 mi)	Stage with mountain(s)	Franco Chioccioli (ITA)
7	29 May	Campitello Matese to Avezzano	178 km (111 mi)	Stage with mountain(s)	Andreas Kappes (FRG)
8	30 May	Avezzano to Chianciano Terme	251 km (156 mi)	Stage with mountain(s)	Jean-François Bernard (FRA)
9	31 May	Pienza to Marina di Massa	235 km (146 mi)	Plain stage	Alessio Di Basco (ITA)
10	1 June	Carrara to Salsomaggiore Terme	190 km (118 mi)	Stage with mountain(s)	Paolo Rosola (ITA)
11	2 June	Parma to Colle Don Bosco	~~229 km (142 mi)~~	Plain stage	Stage Cancelled
12	3 June	Novara to Selvino	205 km (127 mi)	Stage with mountain(s)	Andrew Hampsten (USA)
13	4 June	Bergamo to Chiesa in Valmalenco	129 km (80 mi)	Stage with mountain(s)	Tony Rominger (SUI)
14	5 June	Chiesa in Valmalenco to Bormio	120 km (75 mi)	Stage with mountain(s)	Erik Breukink (NED)
15	6 June	Spondigna to Merano 2000	83 km (52 mi)	Stage with mountain(s)	Jean-François Bernard (FRA)
16	7 June	Merano to Innsbruck (Austria)	176 km (109 mi)	Stage with mountain(s)	Franco Vona (ITA)
17	8 June	Innsbruck (Austria) to Borgo Valsugana	221 km (137 mi)	Stage with mountain(s)	Patrizio Gambirasio (ITA)
18	9 June	Levico Terme to Valico del Vetriolo	18 km (11 mi)	Individual time trial	Andrew Hampsten (USA)
19	10 June	Borgo Valsugana to Arta Terme	223 km (139 mi)	Stage with mountain(s)	Stefano Giuliani (ITA)
20	11 June	Arta Terme to Lido di Jesolo	212 km (132 mi)	Plain stage	Alessio Di Basco (ITA) (Note: Paolo Rosola was the original winner of stage 20 but was later disqualified.)
21a	12 June	Lido di Jesolo to Vittorio Veneto	73 km (45 mi)	Plain stage	Urs Freuler (SUI)
21b	12 June	Vittorio Veneto to Vittorio Veneto	43 km (27 mi)	Individual time trial	Lech Piasecki (POL)
	Total		3,579 km (2,224 mi)		

== Race overview ==
Toshiba–Look's Jean-François Bernard shown wearing his team jersey, the design of which drew on the artwork of Piet Mondrian.

The Giro began with a 9 km (5.6 mi) time trial in the city of Urbino, which was won by Jean-François Bernard with a three-second margin over Tony Rominger. Guido Bontempi won the second stage and moved to third overall, while Bernard gained a five-second buffer over the second-placed rider, Rominger. In stage 4a, Massimo Podenzana soloed to victory in Rodi Garganico, five minutes ahead of the second-place finisher. This victory and the respective time bonus allowed Podenzana to gain the maglia rosa, which he held until stage 12. Stage 4b was a 40 km (24.9 mi) team time trial won by Del Tongo–Colnago, eleven seconds ahead of Carrera Jeans–Vagabond. Podenzana's lead shrunk to a little over two minutes after his team, Atala–Ofmega, finished two minutes and thirty-six seconds behind Del Tongo–Colnago.

The eleventh stage was run without problems until the final mile, when environmentalist protestors occupied the finish line and forced the annulment of the stage. The protestors were upset with a nearby factory, owned by chemical manufacturer Montedison, which the protestors claimed had been polluting the Bormida river. The next stage was marked by the appearance of the major mountains and by Pondenzana conceding the maglia rosa to Franco Chioccioli. The ensuing stages saw the general classification shift more frequently due to the intensity of the mountains and fatigue.

The fourteenth stage was memorable for its extreme weather, most notably on the final climb of the Gavia Pass. Overnight, a large amount of snow had accumulated on the Gavia, but the roads were cleared in time for the riders. Despite the cold and adverse weather forecast, the patron, Vincenzo Torriani, decided to go ahead with the stage. As snow fell on the riders climbing the muddy roads of the Gavia, Hampsten attacked at the base of the mountain but was chased by Erik Breukink, who eventually caught up and passed the American with seven kilometres (4.3 mi) to go. Although Breukink won the stage, Hampsten made the bigger story by becoming the first American to don the maglia rosa in the history of the Giro d'Italia. Conditions were so bad that one rider, Toshiba–Look's Dominique Gaigne, had to be carried on his bike into a shelter as his hands were frozen gripping the handlebars and former winner Giuseppe Saronni even stopped at a spectator's house and returned with a glass of the Italian liqueur Grappa.

The start of the fifteenth stage was moved ahead from Bormio to Spondigna, because of snow covering the Stelvio Pass, but the summit finish in Merano was maintained. As soon as the climb started, Bernard, Urs Zimmermann and Chioccioli attacked. Bernard eventually shook off the two riders and won the stage, but with minimal time gain. The sixteenth stage was marked by rain – which turned into snow as the peloton rose higher – and by two protests while climbing the Rombo Pass. Near the summit of the last climb, Hampsten and a few others formed an escape group that was eventually caught in the final kilometers. The group raced into Innsbruck, where Franco Vona made a last minute attack that won him the stage. Bernard – who was in sixth place overall at the start of the seventeenth stage – crashed in a tunnel but managed to finish the stage; however, the following day he did not start the leg and withdrew from the race.

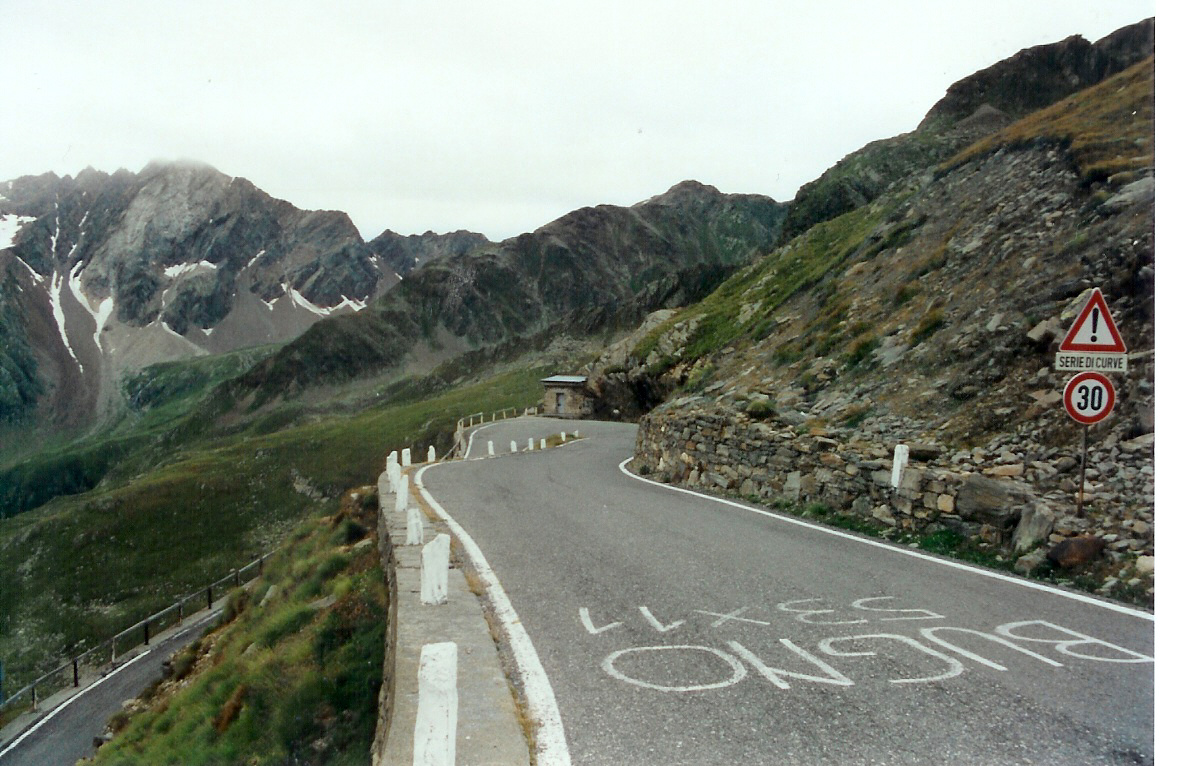
The Gavia Pass was the last climb of the famous fourteenth stage before the participants rode into Bormio for the finish.

The eighteenth stage, an 18 km (11.2 mi) individual time trial, would prove critical in deciding the overall winner of the Giro. The route started off with 5 km (3.1 mi) of flat roads, before the climb to the finish at the Vetriolo Terme ski station in Valico del Vetriolo. Going into the stage, Hampsten led the race by 42 seconds over Breukink, a margin that was increased by a further 32 seconds after the time trial. The nineteenth stage featured three categorized climbs. Zimmermann attacked on the first, the Duran Pass, but was caught later by Stefano Giuliani who bridged the gap on the descent of the Duran. The two riders rode to the finish together in Arta Terme. Although Giuliani won the stage, Zimmermann moved into second place overall, after gaining over three minutes on the general classification contenders.

The twentieth stage came down to a sprint finish, won by Paolo Rosola, who was later disqualified as his teammate, Roberto Pagnin, was found to have pushed him during the sprint. As a result, the second-place finisher, Alessio Di Basco, was awarded the stage victory. The penultimate stage was completely flat and culminated in a bunch sprint, won by Urs Freuler. Hours later, the final stage – a hilly 43 km (26.7 mi) individual time trial – took place. The weather conditions were fine for the majority of the riders, but as the general classification contenders were on the course, it began to lightning and rain heavily. There was a tricky descent about 18 km (11.2 mi) into the stage, which became more dangerous with the rain and ultimately resulted in the crashes of Giupponi and Zimmerman. The time lost by Zimmermann cost him his second place overall. Lech Piasecki, who rode the course when dry, won the stage by a wide margin. Hampsten lost twenty seconds to Breukink, but it did not prevent him from becoming the first American to win the Giro d'Italia. The other podium positions were filled by non-Italian riders for the second year in a row and the third time in the history of the race. Breukink had been part of the non-Italian podium in 1987, behind Ireland's Stephen Roche and Great Britain's Robert Millar.

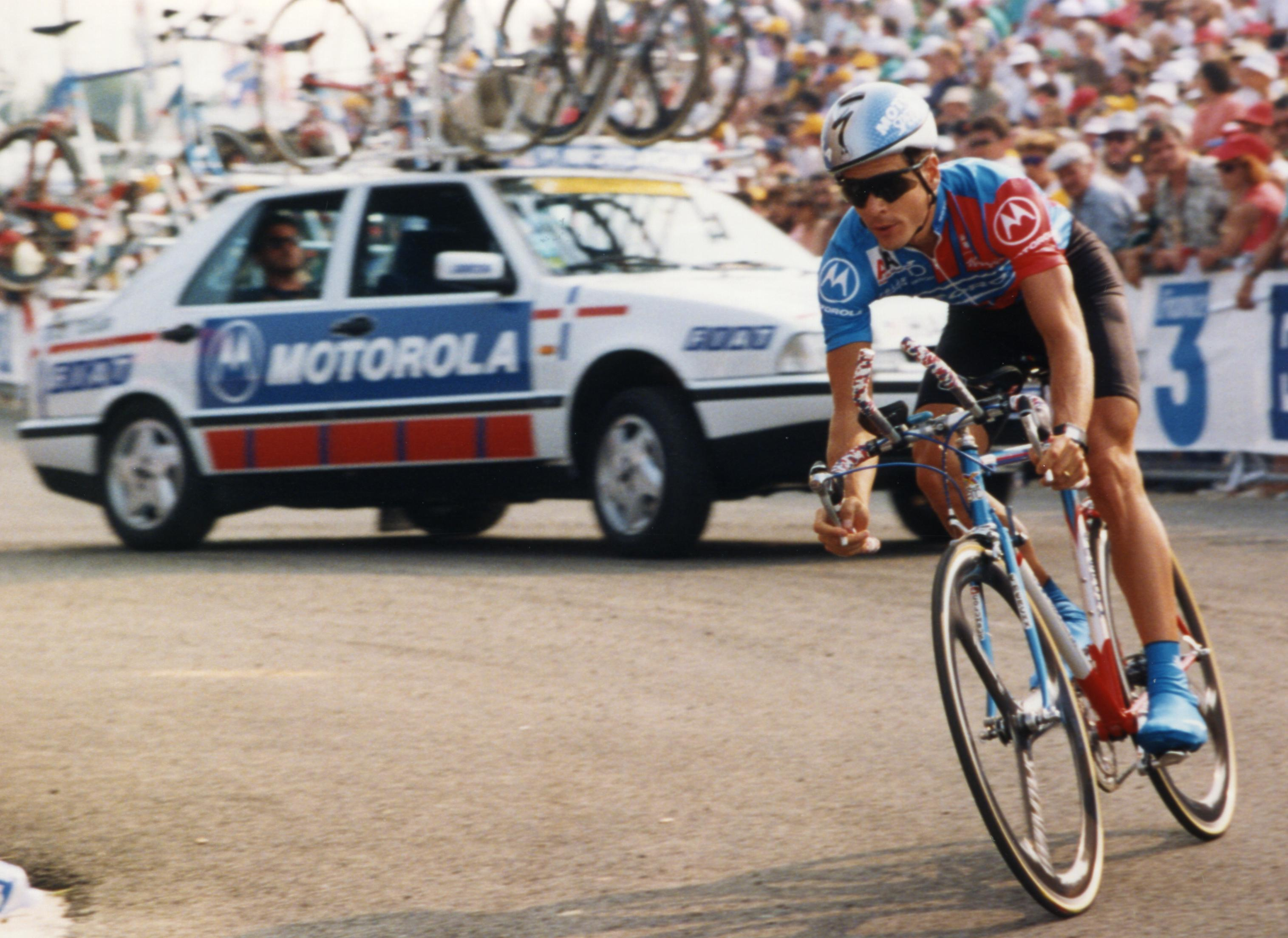
Andrew Hampsten (pictured during the Tour de France in 1993) won two stages and four classifications at the 1988 Giro d'Italia.

Stage success was limited to eleven of the competing teams, seven of which achieved multiple victories. Four individual riders won multiple stages: Bernard (stages 1, 8 and 15), Bontempi (stages 2 and 5), Hampsten (stages 12 and 18), and Di Basco (stages 9 and 20). Toshiba–Look won three stages with Bernard and stage 7 with Andreas Kappes. Panasonic–Isostar–Colnago–Agu won two stages, with Breukink in stage 14, and Freuler in stage 21a. Chateau d'Ax won three stages, with a solo breakaway by Rominger in stage 13; Vona in stage 16, and Giuliani in stage 19. Del Tongo–Colnago also won multiple stages, with Chioccioli in stage 6, Piasecki in stage 21b, and the team time trial in stage 4b. Selca–Ciclolinea, Ceramiche Ariostea, Gewiss-Bianchi and Atala–Ofmega won one stage apiece. Ceramiche Ariostea rider Stephan Joho took stage 3 in a sprint finish, as did Gewiss-Bianchi rider Rosola in stage 10, and Selca–Ciclolinea 's Patrizio Gambirasio in stage 17. Atala–Ofmega's Podenzana won stage 4a after a solo breakaway.

=== Doping ===
The race organizers performed anti-doping controls throughout the race. Riders would be selected after a stage and have thirty minutes to get tested. The results generally would be returned between thirty and sixty minutes later. No rider tested positive in this edition of the Giro, but had this happened, the following penalties would have been applied: the rider would be demoted to last place of the stage, given a ten-minute penalty in the general classification, a lengthy suspension, (Note: According to Stampa Sera, the length of the suspension was one month, while El Mundo Deportivo claimed the suspension lasted six weeks. In addition, the rider was allowed to choose when the suspension would take place, so that it would not interfere with any major races.) and a fine of one thousand francs. Although no riders tested positive, Roberto Visentini, Flavio Giupponi and Urs Zimmermann – who placed second, third and fourth, respectively, in the eighteenth stage – showed up too late for their control tests and were given the penalties corresponding to riders testing positive; after complaints and threats to leave the race from their team leaders, the jury later reverted their decision, and no penalty was given.

== Classification leadership ==
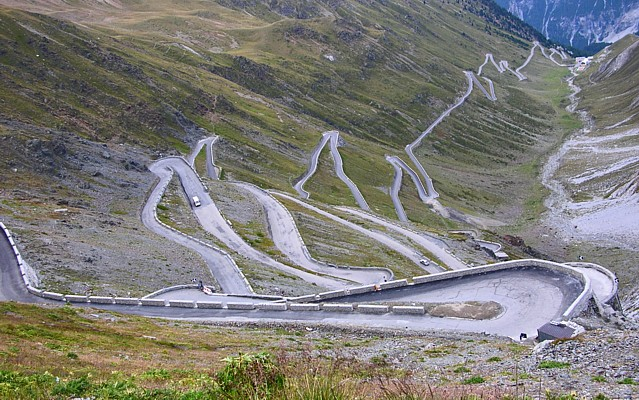
A sample of the 48 hairpin turns near the top of the eastern ramp of the Stelvio Pass, the Cima Coppi (highest elevation point) of the 1988 Giro.

Five different jerseys were worn during the 1988 Giro d'Italia. The leader of the general classification – calculated by adding the stage finish times of each rider, and allowing time bonuses for the first three finishers on mass-start stages – wore a pink jersey. The time bonuses for the 1988 Giro were fifteen seconds for first, ten seconds for second, and five seconds for third place on the stage. This classification is the most important of the race, and its winner is considered as the winner of the Giro.

For the points classification, which awarded a purple (or cyclamen) jersey to its leader, cyclists were given points for finishing a stage in the top 15; additional points could also be won in intermediate sprints. The green jersey was awarded to the mountains classification leader. In this ranking, points were won by reaching the summit of a climb ahead of other cyclists. Each climb was ranked as either first, second or third category, with more points available for higher category climbs. The Cima Coppi, the race's highest point of elevation, carried more points than the other first category climbs. The Cima Coppi for this edition of the Giro was supposed to be the Stelvio Pass, however the day the peloton was supposed to climb it, heavy snow cover forced the organization to omit it from the stage. The white jersey was worn by the leader of young rider classification, a ranking decided the same way as the general classification, but considering only neo-professional cyclists (in their first three years of professional racing).

The combination classification, represented by a blue jersey, was calculated by summing up the points obtained by each rider in the other classifications; the leader was the rider with the lowest total of points. Although no jersey was awarded, there was also one classification for the teams, in which the stage finish times of the best three cyclists per team were added; the leading team was the one with the lowest total time.

Classification leadership by stage
Stage	Winner	General classification	Points classification	Mountains classification	Young rider classification	Combination classification	Team classification
1	Jean-François Bernard	Jean-François Bernard	Jean-François Bernard	not awarded	Bruno Hürlimann	not awarded	Carrera Jeans–Vagabond
2	Guido Bontempi	Jean-François Bernard	Guido Bontempi	Stefano Giuliani	Bruno Hürlimann	not awarded	Carrera Jeans–Vagabond
3	Stephan Joho	Jean-François Bernard	Guido Bontempi	Renato Piccolo	Bruno Hürlimann	Stephan Joho	Carrera Jeans–Vagabond
4a	Massimo Podenzana	Massimo Podenzana	Rolf Sørensen	Renato Piccolo	Massimo Podenzana	Stephan Joho	Carrera Jeans–Vagabond
4b	Del Tongo–Colnago	Massimo Podenzana	Rolf Sørensen	Renato Piccolo	Massimo Podenzana	Stephan Joho	Del Tongo–Colnago
5	Guido Bontempi	Massimo Podenzana	Guido Bontempi	Renato Piccolo	Massimo Podenzana	Stephan Joho	Carrera Jeans–Vagabond
6	Franco Chioccioli	Massimo Podenzana	Guido Bontempi	Renato Piccolo	Massimo Podenzana	Franco Chioccioli	Carrera Jeans–Vagabond
7	Andreas Kappes	Massimo Podenzana	Johan van der Velde	Renato Piccolo	Massimo Podenzana	Franco Chioccioli	Carrera Jeans–Vagabond
8	Jean-François Bernard	Massimo Podenzana	Johan van der Velde	Renato Piccolo	Massimo Podenzana	Franco Chioccioli	Carrera Jeans–Vagabond
9	Alessio Di Basco	Massimo Podenzana	Johan van der Velde	Renato Piccolo	Massimo Podenzana	Franco Chioccioli	Carrera Jeans–Vagabond
10	Paolo Rosola	Massimo Podenzana	Johan van der Velde	Renato Piccolo	Massimo Podenzana	Franco Chioccioli	Carrera Jeans–Vagabond
11	Stage Cancelled	Massimo Podenzana	Johan van der Velde	Renato Piccolo	Massimo Podenzana	Franco Chioccioli	Carrera Jeans–Vagabond
12	Andrew Hampsten	Franco Chioccioli	Johan van der Velde	Renato Piccolo	Franco Vona	Andrew Hampsten	Del Tongo–Colnago
13	Tony Rominger	Franco Chioccioli	Johan van der Velde	Renato Piccolo	Franco Vona	Andrew Hampsten	Del Tongo–Colnago
14	Erik Breukink	Andrew Hampsten	Johan van der Velde	Renato Piccolo	Stefano Tomasini	Andrew Hampsten	Carrera Jeans–Vagabond
15	Jean-François Bernard	Andrew Hampsten	Johan van der Velde	Renato Piccolo	Stefano Tomasini	Andrew Hampsten	Del Tongo–Colnago
16	Franco Vona	Andrew Hampsten	Johan van der Velde	Renato Piccolo	Stefano Tomasini	Andrew Hampsten	Panasonic–Isostar–Colnago–Agu
17	Patrizio Gambirasio	Andrew Hampsten	Johan van der Velde	Renato Piccolo	Stefano Tomasini	Andrew Hampsten	Panasonic–Isostar–Colnago–Agu
18	Andrew Hampsten	Andrew Hampsten	Johan van der Velde	Andrew Hampsten	Stefano Tomasini	Andrew Hampsten	Carrera Jeans–Vagabond
19	Stefano Giuliani	Andrew Hampsten	Johan van der Velde	Andrew Hampsten	Stefano Tomasini	Andrew Hampsten	Carrera Jeans–Vagabond
20	Alessio Di Basco	Andrew Hampsten	Johan van der Velde	Andrew Hampsten	Stefano Tomasini	Andrew Hampsten	Carrera Jeans–Vagabond
21a	Urs Freuler	Andrew Hampsten	Johan van der Velde	Andrew Hampsten	Stefano Tomasini	Andrew Hampsten	Carrera Jeans–Vagabond
21b	Lech Piasecki	Andrew Hampsten	Johan van der Velde	Andrew Hampsten	Stefano Tomasini	Andrew Hampsten	Carrera Jeans–Vagabond
Final		Andrew Hampsten	Johan van der Velde	Andrew Hampsten	Stefano Tomasini	Andrew Hampsten	Carrera Jeans–Vagabond

== Final standings ==
Legend
A pink jersey	Denotes the winner of the General classification	A green jersey	Denotes the winner of the Mountains classification
A purple jersey	Denotes the winner of the Points classification	A white jersey	Denotes the winner of the Young rider classification
A blue jersey	Denotes the winner of the Combination classification		

=== General classification ===
Final general classification (1–10)
Rank	Rider	Team	Time
1	Andrew Hampsten (USA)	7-Eleven–Hoonved	97h 18' 56"
2	Erik Breukink (NED)	Panasonic–Isostar–Colnago–Agu	+ 1' 43"
3	Urs Zimmermann (SUI)	Carrera Jeans–Vagabond	+ 2' 45"
4	Flavio Giupponi (ITA)	Del Tongo–Colnago	+ 6' 56"
5	Franco Chioccioli (ITA)	Del Tongo–Colnago	+ 13' 20"
6	Marco Giovannetti (ITA)	Gisgelati–Ecoflam	+ 15' 20"
7	Pedro Delgado (ESP)	Reynolds	+ 17' 02"
8	Peter Winnen (NED)	Panasonic–Isostar–Colnago–Agu	+ 18' 14"
9	Stefano Tomasini (ITA)	Fanini–Seven Up	+ 27' 01"
10	Maurizio Vandelli (ITA)	Atala–Ofmega	+ 27' 02"

Final general classification (11–125)
Rank	Rider	Team	Time
11	Beat Breu (SUI)	Cyndarella–Isotonic	+ 28' 17"
12	Marc Madiot (FRA)	Toshiba–Look	+ 28' 17"
13	Roberto Visentini (ITA)	Carrera Jeans–Vagabond	+ 40' 07"
14	Raúl Alcalá (MEX)	7-Eleven–Hoonved	+ 40' 09"
15	Franco Vona (ITA)	Chateau d'Ax	+ 42' 31"
16	Juan Tomas Martínez (ESP)	Tokke Zahor	+ 49' 12"
17	Guy Nulens (BEL)	Panasonic–Isostar–Colnago–Agu	+ 53' 49"
18	Massimo Ghirotto (ITA)	Carrera Jeans–Vagabond	+ 54' 48"
19	Alberto Volpi (ITA)	Gewiss–Bianchi	+ 55' 05"
20	Emanuele Bombini (ITA)	Gewiss–Bianchi	+ 55' 33"
21	Ennio Vanotti (ITA)	Chateau d'Ax	+ 57' 39"
22	Silvano Contini (ITA)	Malvor–Bottecchia	+ 58' 12"
23	Helmut Wechselberger (AUT)	Malvor–Bottecchia	+ 59' 17"
24	Claudio Chiappucci (ITA)	Carrera Jeans–Vagabond	+ 1h 01' 11"
25	Marco Franceschini (ITA)	Alba Cucine–Benotto	+ 1h 01' 22"
26	Marino Amadori (ITA)	Alfa Lum–Legnano	+ 1h 02' 42"
27	Giuseppe Saronni (ITA)	Del Tongo–Colnago	+ 1h 03' 28"
28	Claudio Savini (ITA)	Alba Cucine–Benotto	+ 1h 04' 10"
29	Angelo Lecchi (ITA)	Del Tongo–Colnago	+ 1h 04' 30"
30	José Luis Laguía (ESP)	Reynolds	+ 1h 06' 55"
31	Alfio Vandi (ITA)	Isoglass–Galli	+ 1h 08' 58"
32	Luis Javier Lukin (ESP)	Reynolds	+ 1h 10' 21"
33	Roberto Conti (ITA)	Selca–Ciclolinea	+ 1h 11' 30"
34	Mauro-Antonio Santaromita (ITA)	Alba Cucine–Benotto	+ 1h 11' 35"
35	Marco Vitali (ITA)	Atala–Ofmega	+ 1h 12' 07"
36	Luciano Loro (ITA)	Del Tongo–Colnago	+ 1h 14' 58"
37	Fabrice Philipot (FRA)	Toshiba–Look	+ 1h 15' 40"
38	Dominique Arnaud (FRA)	Reynolds	+ 1h 17' 24"
39	Marcello Siboni (ITA)	Ceramiche Ariostea	+ 1h 18' 07"
40	Santiago Portillo (ESP)	Tokke Zahor	+ 1h 18' 43"
41	Massimo Podenzana (ITA)	Atala–Ofmega	+ 1h 18' 57"
42	Rolf Sørensen (DEN)	Ceramiche Ariostea	+ 1h 20' 51"
43	Werner Stutz (SUI)	Cyndarella–Isotonic	+ 1h 25' 51"
44	Tony Rominger (SUI)	Chateau d'Ax	+ 1h 27' 44"
45	Jésus Rodriguez Magro (ESP)	Reynolds	+ 1h 28' 15"
46	Jeff Pierce (USA)	7-Eleven–Hoonved	+ 1h 28' 46"
47	Omar Hernández (COL)	Reynolds	+ 1h 29' 13"
48	Rolf Järmann (SUI)	Cyndarella–Isotonic	+ 1h 35' 20"
49	Roberto Pagnin (ITA)	Gewiss–Bianchi	+ 1h 35' 26"
50	Gianni Faresin (ITA)	Malvor–Bottecchia	+ 1h 36' 02"
51	Enrico Galleschi (ITA)	Alba Cucine–Benotto	+ 1h 38' 24"
52	Luca Rota (ITA)	Del Tongo–Colnago	+ 1h 39' 51"
53	Luciano Rabottini (ITA)	Ceramiche Ariostea	+ 1h 43' 42"
54	Claudio Corti (ITA)	Chateau d'Ax	+ 1h 44' 22"
55	Jörg Müller (SUI)	PDM–Ultima–Concorde	+ 1h 46' 21"
56	Stefano Giuliani (ITA)	Chateau d'Ax	+ 1h 47' 10"
57	Teun van Vliet (NED)	Panasonic–Isostar–Colnago–Agu	+ 1h 48' 15"
58	Daniël Wyder (SUI)	Isoglass–Galli	+ 1h 49' 10"
59	Michele Moro (ITA)	Selca–Ciclolinea	+ 1h 50' 43"
60	Jiri Skoda (CZE)	Alfa Lum–Legnano	+ 1h 51' 01"
61	Bob Roll (USA)	7-Eleven–Hoonved	+ 1h 52' 07"
62	Ron Kiefel (USA)	7-Eleven–Hoonved	+ 1h 52' 21"
63	Renato Piccolo (ITA)	Gewiss–Bianchi	+ 1h 54' 48"
64	Gian-Paolo Fregonese (ITA)	Malvor–Bottecchia	+ 1h 55' 10"
65	Johan van der Velde (NED)	Gisgelati–Ecoflam	+ 1h 56' 27"
66	Marc van Orsouw (NED)	PDM–Ultima–Concorde	+ 1h 57' 15"
67	Pierino Gavazzi (ITA)	Fanini–Seven Up	+ 2h 00' 43"
68	Jesper Worre (DEN)	Gewiss–Bianchi	+ 2h 05' 18"
69	Henk Lubberding (NED)	Panasonic–Isostar–Colnago–Agu	+ 2h 05' 19"
70	Maurizio Piovani (ITA)	Del Tongo–Colnago	+ 2h 06' 11"
71	Kurt Steinmann (SUI)	Cyndarella–Isotonic	+ 2h 07' 12"
72	Bruno Hürlimann (SUI)	Cyndarella–Isotonic	+ 2h 09' 36"
73	Ennio Salvador (ITA)	Gewiss–Bianchi	+ 2h 09' 45"
74	Lech Piasecki (POL)	Del Tongo–Colnago	+ 2h 09' 56"
75	Eric Vanderaerden (BEL)	Panasonic–Isostar–Colnago–Agu	+ 2h 10' 16"
76	Alessandro Pozzi (ITA)	Chateau d'Ax	+ 2h 13' 08"
77	Luigi Botteon (ITA)	Fanini–Seven Up	+ 2h 13' 19"
78	Marco Votolo (ITA)	Carrera Jeans–Vagabond	+ 2h 13' 45"
79	Theo de Rooij (NED)	Panasonic–Isostar–Colnago–Agu	+ 2h 15' 33"
80	Czesław Lang (POL)	Del Tongo–Colnago	+ 2h 16' 48"
81	Daniele Pizzol (ITA)	Malvor–Bottecchia	+ 2h 18' 42"
82	Urs Freuler (SUI)	Panasonic–Isostar–Colnago–Agu	+ 2h 18' 50"
83	Marco Zen (ITA)	Alfa Lum–Legnano	+ 2h 18' 56"
84	Fabio Bordonali (ITA)	Carrera Jeans–Vagabond	+ 2h 19' 32"
85	Silvano Lorenzon (ITA)	Malvor–Bottecchia	+ 2h 19' 36"
86	Alberto Elli (ITA)	Fanini–Seven Up	+ 2h 20' 44"
87	Tullio Cortinovis (ITA)	Atala–Ofmega	+ 2h 20' 44"
88	Francesco Cesarini (ITA)	Ceramiche Ariostea	+ 2h 24' 30"
89	Claudio Vandelli (ITA)	Atala–Ofmega	+ 2h 26' 55"
90	Federico Ghiotto (ITA)	Gisgelati–Ecoflam	+ 2h 31' 27"
91	Guido Bontempi (ITA)	Carrera Jeans–Vagabond	+ 2h 31' 47"
92	Daniel Gisiger (SUI)	Cyndarella–Isotonic	+ 2h 32' 38"
93	Marco Saligari (ITA)	Ceramiche Ariostea	+ 2h 35' 11"
94	Jesus Suarez Cuevas (ESP)	Tokke Zahor	+ 2h 38' 16"
95	Fabrizio Vannucci (ITA)	Selca–Ciclolinea	+ 2h 40' 11"
96	Mario Noris (ITA)	Atala–Ofmega	+ 2h 42' 20"
97	Luigi Furlan (ITA)	Gewiss–Bianchi	+ 2h 45' 16"
98	Melcior Mauri (ESP)	Reynolds	+ 2h 45' 59"
99	Arno Wohlfahrter (AUT)	Malvor–Bottecchia	+ 2h 49' 04"
100	Valerio Piva (ITA)	Ceramiche Ariostea	+ 2h 49' 37"
101	Pierangelo Bincoletto (ITA)	Toshiba–Look	+ 2h 50' 10"
102	Paolo Rosola (ITA)	Gewiss–Bianchi	+ 2h 55' 06"
103	Allan Peiper (AUS)	Panasonic–Isostar–Colnago–Agu	+ 2h 56' 48"
104	Flavio Chesini (ITA)	Alba Cucine–Benotto	+ 2h 57' 52"
105	Johan Lammerts (NED)	Toshiba–Look	+ 2h 58' 24"
106	Giuseppe Petito (ITA)	Gisgelati–Ecoflam	+ 2h 59' 41"
107	Silvio Martinello (ITA)	Atala–Ofmega	+ 3h 05' 27"
108	Luciano Boffo (ITA)	Alfa Lum–Legnano	+ 3h 07' 25"
109	Alessio Di Basco (ITA)	Fanini–Seven Up	+ 3h 07' 48"
110	Giovanni Strazzer (ITA)	Malvor–Bottecchia	+ 3h 08' 59"
111	Eduardo Rocchi (ITA)	Selca–Ciclolinea	+ 3h 10' 13"
112	Antonio Ferretti (SUI)	Isoglass–Galli	+ 3h 11' 02"
113	Daniele del Ben (ITA)	Gisgelati–Ecoflam	+ 3h 11' 07"
114	Stefano Allocchio (ITA)	Chateau d'Ax	+ 3h 17 '00"
115	Paul Popp (AUT)	Malvor–Bottecchia	+ 3h 21' 13"
116	Daniele Caroli (ITA)	Alfa Lum–Legnano	+ 3h 29' 20"
117	Luc Ronsse (BEL)	Isoglass–Galli	+ 3h 34' 56"
118	Davis Phinney (USA)	7-Eleven–Hoonved	+ 3h 40' 27"
119	Jan-Erik Østergaard (DEN)	Isoglass–Galli	+ 3h 43' 00"
120	Patrizio Gambirasio (ITA)	Selca–Ciclolinea	+ 3h 46' 49"
121	Giovanni Bottoia (ITA)	Chateau d'Ax	+ 3h 48' 51"
122	Enrico Grimani (ITA)	Alba Cucine–Benotto	+ 3h 52' 01"
123	Geert Vandewalle (BEL)	Isoglass–Galli	+ 4h 06' 47"
124	Hendrik Redant (BEL)	Isoglass–Galli	+ 4h 19' 36"
125	Dante Morandi (ITA)	Selca–Ciclolinea	+ 4h 48' 15"

=== Points classification ===
Final points classification (1–5)
Rank	Rider	Team	Points
1	Johan van der Velde (NED)	Gisgelati–Ecoflam	154
2	Rolf Sørensen (DEN)	Ceramiche Ariostea	131
3	Andrew Hampsten (USA)	7-Eleven–Hoonved	129
4	Alessio Di Basco (ITA)	Fanini–Seven Up	117
5	Erik Breukink (NED)	Panasonic–Isostar–Colnago–Agu	115

=== Mountains classification ===
Final mountains classification (1–5)
Rank	Rider	Team	Points
1	Andrew Hampsten (USA)	7-Eleven–Hoonved	59
2	Stefano Giuliani (ITA)	Panasonic–Isostar–Colnago–Agu	55
3	Renato Piccolo (ITA)	Gewiss–Bianchi	49
4	Urs Zimmermann (SUI)	Carrera Jeans–Vagabond	40
5	Tony Rominger (SUI)	Chateau d'Ax	23

=== Young rider classification ===
Final young rider classification (1–5)
Rank	Rider	Team	Time
1	Stefano Tomasini (ITA)	Fanini–Seven Up	97h 45' 57"
2	Franco Vona (ITA)	Chateau d'Ax	+ 15' 30"
3	Helmut Wechselberger (AUT)	Malvor–Bottecchia	+ 32' 16"
4	Angelo Lecchi (ITA)	Del Tongo–Colnago	+ 37' 37"
5	Luis Javier Lukin (ESP)	Reynolds	+ 43' 20"

=== Team classification ===
Final team classification (1–5)
Rank	Team	Time
1	Carrera Jeans–Vagabond	291h 10' 15"
2	Panasonic–Isostar–Colnago–Agu	+ 4' 34"
3	Del Tongo–Colnago	+ 9' 55"
4	7-Eleven–Hoonved	+ 34' 44"
5	Reynolds	+ 35' 05"

=== Combination classification ===
Final combination classification (1–3)
Rank	Rider	Team	Points
1	Andrew Hampsten (USA)	7-Eleven–Hoonved	8
2	Urs Zimmermann (SUI)	Carrera Jeans–Vagabond	12
3	Erik Breukink (NED)	Panasonic–Isostar–Colnago–Agu	20

=== Special sprints classification ===
Final special sprints classification (1–3)
Rank	Rider	Team	Points
1	Andrew Hampsten (USA)	7-Eleven–Hoonved	21
2	Urs Zimmermann (SUI)	Carrera Jeans–Vagabond	17
3	Rolf Sørensen (DEN)	Ceramiche Ariostea	17

=== Intermediate sprints classification ===
Final intermediate sprints classification (1–4)
Rank	Rider	Team	Points
1	Alessio Di Basco (ITA)	Fanini–Seven Up	41
2	Flavio Chesini (ITA)	Alba Cucine–Benotto	22
3	Enrico Grimani (ITA)	Alba Cucine–Benotto	9
4	Paul Popp (AUT)	Malvor–Bottecchia	8
4	Roberto Pagnin (ITA)	Gewiss–Bianchi	8

=== Combativity classification ===
Final combativity classification (1–5)
Rank	Rider	Team	Points
1	Rolf Sørensen (DEN)	Ceramiche Ariostea	73
2	Emanuele Bombini (ITA)	Gewiss–Bianchi	66
3	Franco Chioccioli (ITA)	Del Tongo–Colnago	50
4	Massimo Podenzana (ITA)	Atala–Ofmega	46
5	Urs Zimmermann (SUI)	Carrera Jeans–Vagabond	43

== Aftermath ==
After the race, Andrew Hampsten told El Mundo Deportivo that he believed this was the biggest win of his career so far and thought he could win the upcoming Tour de France. Hampsten stated that Jean-François Bernard and Pedro Delgado both lacked awareness when attacking in the mountains and did not make the most of the time trials, but believed they would be more active in the Tour de France. In addition, Hampsten thought Bernard and Roberto Visentini did not perform to their expectations. He did not go on to win the Tour de France, but placed fifteenth overall. Runner-up Erik Breukink commented that he was satisfied with his second-place finish, but "Hampsten was simply better at the decisive moments". In addition, Breukink stated he came to the race in order to prepare for the Tour de France in July. At the Tour, he finished in twelfth overall and won the young rider classification for being the highest ranked rider in the general classification under the age of 25. Third place finisher Urs Zimmermann reflected on the race and stated that his chance of winning the overall race were gone after the Gavia stage. l'Unita writer Gino Sala looked back on the race and believed Delgado did not perform well and was not a serious threat to win the race. Luis Gómez, a writer for El País, thought Delgado did not prepare properly for the Giro.

In 2012, the organizer of the Giro d'Italia, RCS Sport, did a survey on the greatest moments in the history of the Giro by interviewing over 100 journalists. The 1988 race was mentioned several times as one of the most memorable, with the journalists citing the fourteenth stage that traversed the Gavia Pass as the highlight. Several writers have referred to the fourteenth stage as being "epic" or "iconic" due to the weather conditions the riders battled over difficult climbs and unpaved roads to finish the stage. According to CyclingNews writer Jason Sumner, a photo from the fourteenth stage depicting the future winner Andrew Hampsten climbing the Gavia while a snowstorm blows in the foreground has become a widely known image that even casual cycling fans would recognize. After the stage, La Gazzetta dello Sport called the stage "The Day the Big Men Cried", with the stage still being commonly referred to as such. (Note: The stage has also been called "The Day the Strong Men Cried".)
