= Combination classification in the Giro d'Italia =

Maglia Azzurra
- Sport: Road Cycling
- Competition: Giro d'Italia
- Awarded for: Winning the combination classification
- English name: Blue jersey
- Local name: Maglia Azzurra (in Italian)

History
- First award: 1972
- Editions: 12
- Final award: 2006
- First winner: Eddy Merckx (BEL)
- Most wins: Eddy Merckx (BEL) (2 wins)
- Most recent: Paolo Savoldelli (ITA)

The Combination classification was a competition in the annual Giro d'Italia bicycle race. It was first introduced in the 1985 Giro d'Italia, where it was first won by the Swiss rider Urs Freuler. The classification was run annually until the 1988 Giro d'Italia, where the American Andrew Hampsten won the classification. The combination classification was replaced in the 1989 Giro d'Italia by the intergiro classification. The classification reappeared after an 11-year hiatus in 2001. It was the absent from the succeeding Giro d'Italia editions until it returned in 2006, where Paolo Savoldelli won the classification. The classification did not return in 2007, as it was replaced by the return of the Young rider classification.

For the 1988 and the 2006 editions of the Giro, the leader of the classification was awarded a blue jersey.

== Combination classification standings ==
Year	First	Points	Second	Points	Third	Points	Ref.
1972	Eddy Merckx (BEL)						
1973	Eddy Merckx (BEL)	4	Felice Gimondi (ITA)	9	Giovanni Battaglin (ITA)	17	
1976	Francesco Moser (ITA)	12	Eddy Merckx (BEL)	31	Arnaldo Caverzasi (ITA)	52	
1977	Wilmo Francioni (ITA)		Mario Beccia (ITA)		Gianbattista Baronchelli (ITA)		
1978	Giuseppe Saronni (ITA)		Wladimiro Panizza (ITA)		Ueli Sutter (SUI)		
1980	Bernard Hinault (FRA)	8	Wladimiro Panizza (ITA)	11	Tommy Prim (SWE)	12	
1985	Urs Freuler (SUI)	44	Acácio da Silva (POR)	38	Paolo Rosola (ITA)	30	
1986	Guido Bontempi (ITA)	52	Pedro Muñoz (ESP)	38	Eric Vanderaerden (BEL)	30	
1987	Stephen Roche (IRL)	80	Robert Millar (GBR)	68	Paolo Rosola (ITA)	60	
1988	Andrew Hampsten (USA)	8	Erik Breukink (NED)	12	Urs Zimmermann (SUI)	20	
2001	Gilberto Simoni (ITA)	13	Pietro Caucchioli (ITA)	35	Unai Osa (ESP)	38	
2006	Paolo Savoldelli (ITA)	775	José Enrique Gutiérrez (ESP)	651	Ivan Basso (ITA)	595	
