= Samuele Schiavina =

Italian cyclist (1971–2016)

Personal information
- Born: 5 June 1971 Ferrara, Italy
- Died: 26 October 2016 (aged 45) Bologna, Italy

Cycling career
- Sport: Cycling
- Role: Rider

Samuele Schiavina (5 June 1971 – 26 October 2016) was an Italian professional racing cyclist. He rode in the 1998 Tour de France.

Schiavina died in October 2016, after having been severely injured in a motorcycle crash.
