= Stephan Joho =

Swiss cyclist

Personal information
- Full name: Stephan Joho
- Born: 4 September 1963 (age 63)

Cycling career
- Sport: Cycling
- Discipline: Road

Professional teams
- 1985: Heur Chrono Quartz
- 1986–1987: KAS
- 1988–1990: Ariostea
- 1991: Weinmann
- 1992: Ariostea

Major wins
- Grand Tours Giro d'Italia 2 Stages (1988, 1989)

Stephan Joho (born 4 September 1963) is a Swiss former professional cyclist. He is most known for winning two stages in the Giro d'Italia. He also competed in the individual pursuit and points race events at the 1984 Summer Olympics.
