= Duran Pass =

Mountain pass in Italy

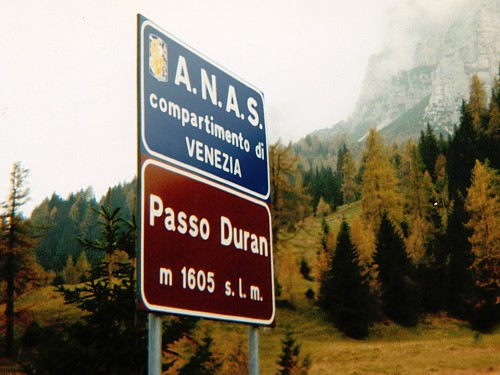

- Location within Alps
- Elevation: 1,601 metres (5,253 ft)

Third Approach
- Location: Belluno, Italy
- Range: Dolomites
- Coordinates: 46°19′30″N 12°05′45″E

The Duran Pass (Italian: Passo Duran) (el. 1601 m.) is a high mountain pass in the Dolomites in the province of Belluno in Italy.

It is situated between the municipality of La Valle Agordina and Zoldo Alto; it connects Agordo in the Cordevole valley and Pralongo in the Zoldo valley. The pass road is SS 347. There are two restaurants and a little church at the summit. The pass is regularly used on the Giro d'Italia, with the last edition to climb the Duran being the 2012 Giro. Climbing from the classic Agordo side, the climb averages 8.1% for 12.2 km, with a maximum gradient of 14%.

== See also ==
- List of mountain passes
