= Renato Piccolo =

Italian cyclist

Personal information
- Full name: Renato Piccolo
- Born: 31 December 1962 (age 63) Portogruaro, Italy

Cycling career
- Sport: Cycling
- Discipline: Road

Professional teams
- 1985–1986: Malvor
- 1987–1989: Gewiss

Renato Piccolo (born 31 December 1962) is an Italian former professional cyclist. He is best known for leading the Mountains classification of the 1988 Giro d'Italia for over ten stages, but finishing third overall at the Giro's conclusion. He also competed in the individual road race event at the 1984 Summer Olympics.
