= Stefano Giuliani =

Italian cyclist

Personal information
- Full name: Stefano Giuliani
- Born: 2 January 1958 (age 68)

Cycling career
- Sport: Cycling
- Discipline: Road
- Role: Rider

Professional teams
- 1983–1985: Gis Gelati
- 1986–1987: Supermerc. Brianzoli
- 1988: Chateau d'Ax
- 1989–1991: Jolly Componibili

Major wins
- Grand Tours Giro d'Italia 2 Stages (1988, 1989)

Stefano Giuliani (born 2 January 1958) was a former Italian professional cyclist. He is most known for winning two stages in the Giro d'Italia.
