= Massimo Podenzana =

Italian cyclist

Personal information
- Full name: Massimo Podenzana
- Born: 29 July 1961 (age 65) La Spezia, Italy
- Height: 1.82 m (6 ft 0 in)
- Weight: 67 kg (148 lb; 10 st 8 lb)

Cycling career
- Sport: Cycling
- Current team: Team Novo Nordisk
- Discipline: Road
- Role: Rider (retired); Directeur sportif

Professional teams
- 1987–1989: Atala
- 1990–1992: Italbonifica-Navigare
- 1993–1994: Navigare-Blue Storm
- 1995: Brescialat
- 1996: Carrera Jeans
- 1997–2001: Mercatone Uno

Managerial teams
- 2002: Mercatone Uno
- 2003: Nippon Hodo
- 2004: Nippo
- 2005–2010: Ceramica Flaminia
- 2011–: Team Type 1–Sanofi Aventis

Major wins
- Trofeo Melinda (1994); Giro di Toscana (1995); GP Industria & Artigianato di Larciano (1999)

Massimo Podenzana (born 29 July 1961 in La Spezia) is an Italian former road racing cyclist. Podenzana won stages in both the Giro d'Italia, and the Tour de France, as well as a variety of other cycling classics.

== Major results ==
1986
1st, Giro della Valli Aretine
1988
1st, Stage 4, Giro d'Italia
1991
3rd, Gran Premio Industria e Commercio di Prato
1993
1st, Gran Premio Città di Camaiore
1st, Gran Premio Industria e Commercio di Prato
1st, National Road Race Championships
2nd, Milano–Vignola
1994
1st, National Road Race Championships
1st, Trofeo Melinda
7th, Overall, Giro d'Italia
1995
1st, Giro di Toscana
3rd, Gran Premio Città di Camaiore
3rd, Eschborn-Frankfurt City Loop
1996
1st, Stage 15, Tour de France
2nd, Trofeo Melinda
3rd, Trofeo Matteotti
3rd, Clásica de San Sebastián
1997
3rd, Giro dell'Appennino
1998
2nd, Gran Premio Città di Camaiore
1999
1st, GP Industria & Artigianato di Larciano
