= Patrizio Gambirasio =

Italian cyclist

Personal information
- Full name: Patrizio Gambirasio
- Born: 23 January 1961 (age 65) Calusco d'Adda, Italy

Cycling career
- Sport: Cycling
- Current team: Retired
- Discipline: Road
- Role: Rider

Professional teams
- 1983–1984: Gis Gelati
- 1985–1986: Santini

Major wins
- Grand Tours Giro d'Italia 1 Stage (1988)

Patrizio Gambirasio (born 23 January 1961) is an Italian former professional cyclist. He is best known for winning one stage in the 1988 Giro d'Italia.

== Major results ==
1981
1st Gran Premio Industria e Commercio Artigianato Carnaghese
1982
1st Milan-Busseto
1st Stage 1 Peace Race
1st Stage 3 Girobio
1st Stage 1 Settimana Ciclistica Lombarda
1988
1st Stage 17 Giro d'Italia

=== Grand Tour general classification results timeline ===
Grand Tour	1984	1985	1986	1987	1988	1989
Giro d'Italia	—	135	137	DNF	120	141
Tour de France	—	DNF	—	—	—	—
Vuelta a España	92	—	—	—	—	—

Legend
—	Did not compete
DNF	Did not finish
