= Alessio Di Basco =

Italian cyclist

Personal information
- Full name: Alessio Di Basco
- Born: 18 November 1964 (age 61) Vecchiano, Italy
- Height: 1.76 m (5 ft 9 in)
- Weight: 70 kg (154 lb)

Cycling career
- Sport: Cycling
- Discipline: Road
- Role: Rider

Professional teams
- 1987–1988: Remac–Fanini
- 1989: Pepsi-Cola–Alba Cucine
- 1990–1991: Gis Gelati–Benotto
- 1992: Amore & Vita–Fanini
- 1993: Mapei–Viner
- 1994–1995: Amore & Vita–Galatron
- 1996–1997: Saeco–AS Juvenes San Marino

Major wins
- Grand Tours Giro d'Italia 2 individual stages (1988) Vuelta a España 1 individual stage (1994)

Alessio Di Basco (born 18 November 1964) is an Italian former professional cyclist. He is best known for winning two stages in the Giro d'Italia and one in the Vuelta a España.

== Major results ==
1988
Giro d'Italia

1st Stages 9 & 20

3rd Trofeo Laigueglia
1990
6th G.P. Camaiore
1992
1st Stage 1 Tour de Suisse
1994
1st Stage 15 Vuelta a España
1995
Volta a Portugal

1st Stages 1 & 10

1st Stage 5 West Virginia Classic
2nd Coppa Bernocchi
2nd Coppa Sabatini
3rd Giro dell'Emilia
9th Giro di Romagna
1997
6th Coppa Bernocchi
