= Urs Zimmermann =

Swiss cyclist

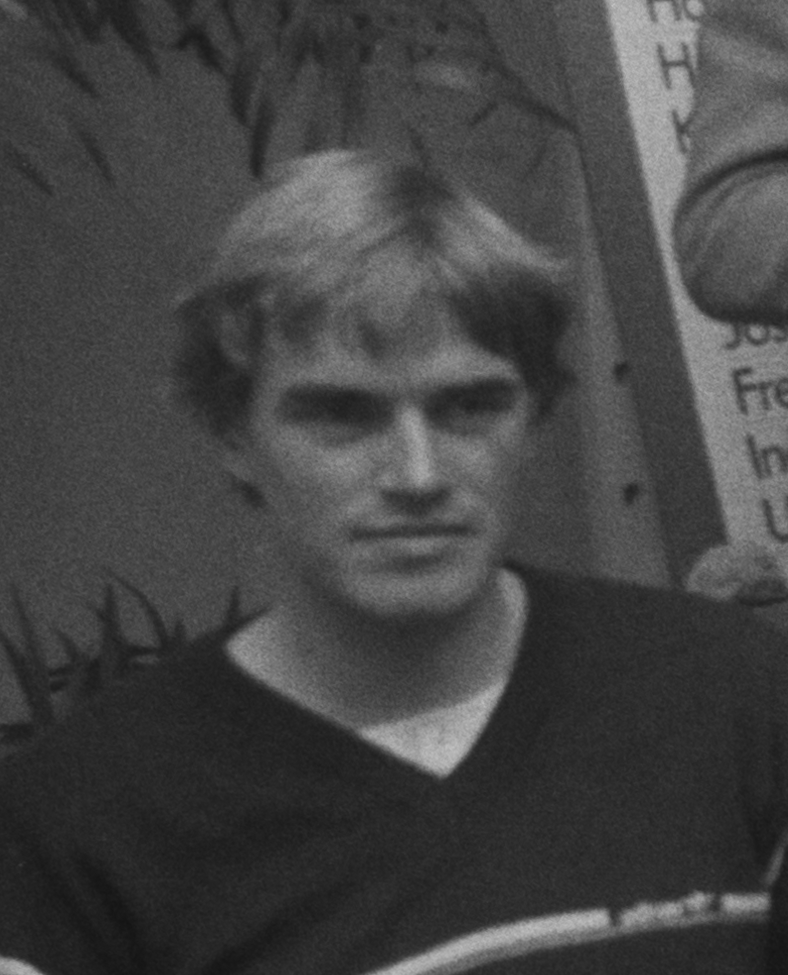
- Zimmermann in 1984

Personal information
- Full name: Urs Zimmermann
- Born: 29 November 1959 (age 66) Mühledorf, Switzerland

Cycling career
- Sport: Cycling
- Current team: Retired
- Discipline: Road
- Role: Rider

Professional teams
- 1983–1984: Cilo-Aufina
- 1985–1989: Carrera Jeans-Vagabond
- 1990: 7 Eleven-Hoonved
- 1991–1992: Motorola

Major wins
- Stage races Tour de Suisse (1984) Critérium du Dauphiné Libéré (1986) Critérium International (1986) One-day races and Classics National Road Race Championships (1986)

Urs Zimmermann (born 29 November 1959 in Mühledorf) is a Swiss former professional road racing cyclist. He stood on the podium in two of the three Grand Tour events after finishing third in 1986 Tour de France and 1988 Giro d'Italia. He also won several stage races such as the Tour de Suisse, Dauphiné Libéré and Critérium International.

After the eleventh stage of the 1991 Tour de France, there was a rest day, on which the cyclists were transferred from Nantes to Pau, by airplane. Zimmermann had a fear of flying, so he refused to use the airplane. The jury then disqualified him, but after the other cyclists protested, he was allowed to use other means of transportation.

He was the Swiss National Road Race champion in 1986.

== Career achievements ==
=== Major results ===
1981
3rd National Hill Climb Championships
10th Overall Grand Prix Guillaume Tell
1982
2nd Overall Grand Prix Guillaume Tell
3rd Overall Tour du Vaucluse
1983
4th GP du Canton d'Argovie
1984
1st Overall Tour de Suisse
1st Grabs–Voralp
2nd Gran Premio di Lugano
7th La Flèche Wallonne
9th Trofeo Baracchi
1985
1st GP de la Liberté
1st Stage 9a (TTT) Tour de Suisse
2nd Giro del Piemonte
3rd Coppa Agostoni
8th Coppa Sabatini
1986
1st Road race, National Road Championships
1st Overall Criterium du Dauphiné Libéré
1st Overall Critérium International

1st Stage 2

1st Giro del Lazio
1st Profronde van Tiel
2nd Overall Paris–Nice
3rd Overall Tour de France
4th Overall Tour de Suisse
8th Overall Tour de Romandie
10th Giro dell'Emilia
1987
1st Stage 2 (TTT) Tour de France
6th Gran Premio di Lugano
8th Overall Paris–Nice

1st Stage 1 (TTT)

1988
1st Overall Giro del Trentino

1st Stage 1

3rd Overall Tour de Romandie

1st Stage 4b (ITT)

3rd Overall Giro d'Italia
6th Rund um den Henninger Turm
1989
5th Overall Tour de Romandie
6th Overall Giro d'Italia
1990
2nd Giro del Friuli
4th Overall Giro del Trentino

==== General classification results timeline ====
Grand Tour	1984	1985	1986	1987	1988	1989	1990	1991	1992
Vuelta a España	—	—	—	—	—	—	—	—	—
Giro d'Italia	—	50	—	—	3	6	DNF	—	44
Tour de France	58	—	3	DNF	DNF	DNF	—	116	—

Legend
—	Did not compete
DNF	Did not finish
