= Stefano Tomasini =

Italian cyclist

Personal information
- Full name: Stefano Tomasini
- Born: 20 August 1963 (age 63) Gandino, Italy

Cycling career
- Sport: Cycling
- Discipline: Road
- Role: Rider

Professional teams
- 1987–1988: Remac–Fanini
- 1989: Pepsi-Cola–Fanini–FNT
- 1990: Malvor–Sidi

Major wins
- Grand Tours Giro d'Italia Young rider Classification (1988)

Stefano Tomasini (born 20 August 1963) is an Italian former professional cyclist, who competed between the years of 1987 and 1990. Tomasini is most known for winning the Young rider Classification at the 1988 Giro d'Italia. That year, he finished ninth overall. That was his highest finish at the Giro in his short career.

== Major results ==
1987
1st Overall Herald Sun Tour

1st Stage 11

1988
1st Memorial Gastone Nencini
1st Trofeo dello Scalatore
3rd Overall Herald Sun Tour
3rd G.P. Camaiore
9th Overall Giro d'Italia

1st Young rider classification

1989
1st Stage 2 Giro del Trentino
5th Giro di Toscana
1990
4th Overall Ruota d'Oro
7th Overall Giro del Trentino
