= 1989 Giro d'Italia, Stage 13 to Stage 22 =

Cycling race stages

The 1989 Giro d'Italia was the 72nd edition of the Giro d'Italia, one of cycling's Grand Tours. The Giro began in Taormina, with a flat stage on 21 May, and Stage 13 occurred on 2 June with a stage from Padua. The race finished in Florence on 11 June.

== Stage 13 ==
2 June 1989 — Padua to Tre Cime di Lavaredo, 207 km (129 mi)

Stage 13 result

Rank	Rider	Team	Time
1	Luis Herrera (COL)	Café de Colombia	5h 34' 41"
2	Laurent Fignon (FRA)	Super U–Raleigh–Fiat	+ 1"
3	Erik Breukink (NED)	Panasonic–Isostar–Colnago–Agu	+ 1' 04"
4	Andrew Hampsten (USA)	7-Eleven	s.t.
5	Franco Chioccioli (ITA)	Del Tongo	+ 1' 10"
6	Roberto Conti (ITA)	Selca	+ 1' 14"
7	Marco Giovannetti (ITA)	Seur	+ 1' 33"
8	Stephen Roche (IRL)	Fagor–MBK	+ 1' 47"
9	Henry Cárdenas (COL)	Café de Colombia	+ 1' 58"
10	Jure Pavlič (YUG)	Carrera Jeans–Vagabond	+ 2' 09"

General classification after Stage 13

Rank	Rider	Team	Time
1	Erik Breukink (NED)	Panasonic–Isostar–Colnago–Agu	60h 44' 04"
2	Laurent Fignon (FRA)	Super U–Raleigh–Fiat	+ 53"
3	Stephen Roche (IRL)	Fagor–MBK	+ 1' 32"
4	Luis Herrera (COL)	Café de Colombia	+ 2' 15"
5	Piotr Ugrumov (URS)	Alfa Lum–STM	+ 2' 23"
6	Flavio Giupponi (ITA)	Malvor–Sidi	+ 2' 51"
7	Marino Lejarreta (ESP)	Caja Rural	+ 3' 04"
8	Claude Criquielion (BEL)	Hitachi–Zonca	+ 3' 17"
9	Andrew Hampsten (USA)	7-Eleven	s.t.
10	Franco Chioccioli (ITA)	Del Tongo	+ 3' 27"

== Stage 14 ==
3 June 1989 — Misurina to Corvara, 131 km (81 mi)

Stage 14 result

Rank	Rider	Team	Time
1	Flavio Giupponi (ITA)	Malvor–Sidi	4h 07' 00"
2	Laurent Fignon (FRA)	Super U–Raleigh–Fiat	+ 5"
3	Andrew Hampsten (USA)	7-Eleven	+ 8"
4	Marco Giovannetti (ITA)	Seur	+ 11"
5	Urs Zimmermann (SUI)	Carrera Jeans–Vagabond	+ 14"
6	Franco Chioccioli (ITA)	Del Tongo	+ 15"
7	Roberto Conti (ITA)	Selca	+ 1' 10"
8	Phil Anderson (AUS)	TVM–Ragno	+ 2' 23"
9	Vladimir Poulnikov (URS)	Alfa Lum–STM	+ 3' 15"
10	Maurizio Rossi (ITA)	Jolly Componibili–Club 88	+ 3' 20"

General classification after Stage 14

Rank	Rider	Team	Time
1	Laurent Fignon (FRA)	Super U–Raleigh–Fiat	64h 52' 36"
2	Flavio Giupponi (ITA)	Malvor–Sidi	+ 1' 50"
3	Andrew Hampsten (USA)	7-Eleven	+ 2' 31"
4	Franco Chioccioli (ITA)	Del Tongo	+ 2' 51"
5	Urs Zimmermann (SUI)	Carrera Jeans–Vagabond	+ 3' 03"
6	Marco Giovannetti (ITA)	Seur	+ 3' 43"
7	Stephen Roche (IRL)	Fagor–MBK	+ 4' 01"
8	Erik Breukink (NED)	Panasonic–Isostar–Colnago–Agu	+ 5' 00"
9	Roberto Conti (ITA)	Selca	+ 5' 07"
10	Marino Lejarreta (ESP)	Caja Rural	+ 5' 33"

== Stage 15a ==
4 June 1989 — Corvara to Trento, 131 km (81 mi)

Stage 15a result

Rank	Rider	Team	Time
1	Jean-Paul van Poppel (NED)	Panasonic–Isostar–Colnago–Agu	3h 04' 26"
2	Alessio Di Basco (ITA)	Pepsi-Cola–Alba Cucine	s.t.
3	Adriano Baffi (ITA)	Ariostea	s.t.
4	Paul Popp (AUT)	Caja Rural	s.t.
5	Stephan Joho (SUI)	Ariostea	s.t.
6	Urs Freuler (SUI)	Panasonic–Isostar–Colnago–Agu	s.t.
7	Fabiano Fontanelli (ITA)	Selca	s.t.
8	Andrei Tchmil (URS)	Alfa Lum–STM	s.t.
9	Jürg Bruggmann (SUI)	Frank–Toyo–Magniflex	s.t.
10	Luciano Boffo (ITA)	Jolly Componibili–Club 88	s.t.

General classification after Stage 15a

Rank	Rider	Team	Time
1	Laurent Fignon (FRA)	Super U–Raleigh–Fiat	

== Stage 15b ==
4 June 1989 — Trento to Trento, 83.2 km (51.7 mi)

Stage 15b result

Rank	Rider	Team	Time
1	Lech Piasecki (POL)	Malvor–Sidi	2h 08' 21"
2	Luca Gelfi (ITA)	Del Tongo	s.t.
3	Francesco Rossignoli (ITA)	Fagor–MBK	s.t.
4	Jos van Aert (BEL)	Hitachi–Zonca	s.t.
5	Piotr Ugrumov (URS)	Alfa Lum–STM	s.t.
6	Maurizio Rossi (ITA)	Jolly Componibili–Club 88	s.t.
7	John Carlsen (DEN)	Fagor–MBK	s.t.
8	Stefano Giuliani (ITA)	Jolly Componibili–Club 88	+ 21"
9	Adriano Baffi (ITA)	Ariostea	+ 2' 21"
10	Paul Popp (AUT)	Caja Rural	s.t.

General classification after Stage 15b

Rank	Rider	Team	Time
1	Laurent Fignon (FRA)	Super U–Raleigh–Fiat	70h 07' 39"
2	Flavio Giupponi (ITA)	Malvor–Sidi	+ 1' 50"
3	Andrew Hampsten (USA)	7-Eleven	+ 2' 31"
4	Franco Chioccioli (ITA)	Del Tongo	+ 2' 51"
5	Urs Zimmermann (SUI)	Carrera Jeans–Vagabond	+ 3' 03"
6	Marco Giovannetti (ITA)	Seur	+ 3' 43"
7	Stephen Roche (IRL)	Fagor–MBK	+ 4' 01"
8	Erik Breukink (NED)	Panasonic–Isostar–Colnago–Agu	+ 5' 00"
9	Roberto Conti (ITA)	Selca	+ 5' 25"
10	Marino Lejarreta (ESP)	Caja Rural	+ 5' 33"

== Stage 16 ==
5 June 1989 — Trento ~~to Santa Caterina di Valfurva~~

The stage was cancelled due to bad weather.

== Stage 17 ==
6 June 1989 — Sondrio to Meda, 137 km (85 mi)

Stage 17 result

Rank	Rider	Team	Time
1	Phil Anderson (AUS)	TVM–Ragno	3h 44' 25"
2	Gianni Bugno (ITA)	Chateau d'Ax	+ 4"
3	Moreno Argentin (ITA)	Gewiss–Bianchi	s.t.
4	Maurizio Fondriest (ITA)	Del Tongo	s.t.
5	Rolf Järmann (SUI)	Frank–Toyo–Magniflex	+ 6"
6	Silvio Martinello (ITA)	Atala–Campagnolo	+ 15"
7	Stephan Joho (SUI)	Ariostea	s.t.
8	Alessio Di Basco (ITA)	Pepsi-Cola–Alba Cucine	s.t.
9	Paolo Cimini (ITA)	Jolly Componibili–Club 88	s.t.
10	Patrizio Gambirasio (ITA)	Selca	s.t.

General classification after Stage 17

Rank	Rider	Team	Time
1	Laurent Fignon (FRA)	Super U–Raleigh–Fiat	73h 52' 19"
2	Flavio Giupponi (ITA)	Malvor–Sidi	+ 1' 50"
3	Andrew Hampsten (USA)	7-Eleven	+ 2' 31"
4	Franco Chioccioli (ITA)	Del Tongo	+ 2' 51"
5	Urs Zimmermann (SUI)	Carrera Jeans–Vagabond	+ 3' 03"
6	Marco Giovannetti (ITA)	Seur	+ 3' 43"
7	Stephen Roche (IRL)	Fagor–MBK	+ 4' 01"
8	Erik Breukink (NED)	Panasonic–Isostar–Colnago–Agu	+ 5' 00"
9	Roberto Conti (ITA)	Selca	+ 5' 25"
10	Marino Lejarreta (ESP)	Caja Rural	+ 5' 33"

== Stage 18 ==
7 June 1989 — Mendrisio to Monte Generoso, 10.7 km (6.6 mi) (ITT)

Stage 18 result

Rank	Rider	Team	Time
1	Luis Herrera (COL)	Café de Colombia	28' 30"
2	Ivan Ivanov (URS)	Alfa Lum–STM	+ 19"
3	Andrew Hampsten (USA)	7-Eleven	+ 35"
4	Stephen Roche (IRL)	Fagor–MBK	+ 53"
5	Erik Breukink (NED)	Panasonic–Isostar–Colnago–Agu	+ 59"
6	Henry Cárdenas (COL)	Café de Colombia	+ 1' 02"
7	Vladimir Poulnikov (URS)	Alfa Lum–STM	+ 1' 03"
8	Flavio Giupponi (ITA)	Malvor–Sidi	+ 1' 11"
9	Urs Zimmermann (SUI)	Carrera Jeans–Vagabond	s.t.
10	Jesper Skibby (DEN)	TVM–Ragno	+ 1' 18"

General classification after Stage 18

Rank	Rider	Team	Time
1	Laurent Fignon (FRA)	Super U–Raleigh–Fiat	74h 22' 34"
2	Flavio Giupponi (ITA)	Malvor–Sidi	+ 1' 16"
3	Andrew Hampsten (USA)	7-Eleven	+ 1' 21"
4	Urs Zimmermann (SUI)	Carrera Jeans–Vagabond	+ 2' 29"
5	Franco Chioccioli (ITA)	Del Tongo	+ 2' 43"
6	Stephen Roche (IRL)	Fagor–MBK	+ 3' 09"
7	Erik Breukink (NED)	Panasonic–Isostar–Colnago–Agu	+ 4' 14"
8	Marco Giovannetti (ITA)	Seur	+ 4' 38"
9	Roberto Conti (ITA)	Selca	+ 5' 22"
10	Marino Lejarreta (ESP)	Caja Rural	+ 5' 32"

== Stage 19 ==
8 June 1989 — Meda to Tortona, 198 km (123 mi)

Stage 19 result

Rank	Rider	Team	Time
1	Jesper Skibby (DEN)	TVM–Ragno	5h 21' 36"
2	Massimo Ghirotto (ITA)	Carrera Jeans–Vagabond	s.t.
3	Piotr Ugrumov (URS)	Alfa Lum–STM	s.t.
4	Franco Vona (ITA)	Chateau d'Ax	s.t.
5	Jean-Paul van Poppel (NED)	Panasonic–Isostar–Colnago–Agu	+ 3"
6	Fabiano Fontanelli (ITA)	Selca	s.t.
7	Paolo Cimini (ITA)	Jolly Componibili–Club 88	s.t.
8	Stefano Zanatta (ITA)	Chateau d'Ax	s.t.
9	Silvio Martinello (ITA)	Atala–Campagnolo	s.t.
10	Frank Hoste (BEL)	AD Renting–W-Cup–Bottecchia	s.t.

General classification after Stage 19

Rank	Rider	Team	Time
1	Laurent Fignon (FRA)	Super U–Raleigh–Fiat	79h 44' 13"
2	Flavio Giupponi (ITA)	Malvor–Sidi	+ 1' 16"
3	Andrew Hampsten (USA)	7-Eleven	+ 1' 21"
4	Urs Zimmermann (SUI)	Carrera Jeans–Vagabond	+ 2' 29"
5	Franco Chioccioli (ITA)	Del Tongo	+ 2' 43"
6	Stephen Roche (IRL)	Fagor–MBK	+ 3' 09"
7	Erik Breukink (NED)	Panasonic–Isostar–Colnago–Agu	+ 4' 14"
8	Marco Giovannetti (ITA)	Seur	+ 4' 38"
9	Roberto Conti (ITA)	Selca	+ 5' 22"
10	Marino Lejarreta (ESP)	Caja Rural	+ 5' 32"

== Stage 20 ==
9 June 1989 — Voghera to La Spezia, 220 km (140 mi)

Stage 20 result

Rank	Rider	Team	Time
1	Laurent Fignon (FRA)	Super U–Raleigh–Fiat	6h 10' 50"
2	Maurizio Fondriest (ITA)	Del Tongo	s.t.
3	Phil Anderson (AUS)	TVM–Ragno	s.t.
4	Flavio Giupponi (ITA)	Malvor–Sidi	s.t.
5	Andrew Hampsten (USA)	7-Eleven	s.t.
6	Erik Breukink (NED)	Panasonic–Isostar–Colnago–Agu	s.t.
7	Marino Lejarreta (ESP)	Caja Rural	s.t.
8	Stephen Roche (IRL)	Fagor–MBK	s.t.
9	Franco Chioccioli (ITA)	Del Tongo	s.t.
10	Paolo Rosola (ITA)	Gewiss–Bianchi	+ 8"

General classification after Stage 20

Rank	Rider	Team	Time
1	Laurent Fignon (FRA)	Super U–Raleigh–Fiat	85h 54' 53"
2	Flavio Giupponi (ITA)	Malvor–Sidi	+ 1' 26"
3	Andrew Hampsten (USA)	7-Eleven	+ 1' 31"
4	Urs Zimmermann (SUI)	Carrera Jeans–Vagabond	+ 2' 47"
5	Franco Chioccioli (ITA)	Del Tongo	+ 2' 53"
6	Stephen Roche (IRL)	Fagor–MBK	+ 3' 19"
7	Erik Breukink (NED)	Panasonic–Isostar–Colnago–Agu	+ 4' 24"
8	Marco Giovannetti (ITA)	Seur	+ 4' 56"
9	Roberto Conti (ITA)	Selca	+ 5' 40"
10	Marino Lejarreta (ESP)	Caja Rural	+ 5' 42"

== Stage 21 ==
10 June 1989 — La Spezia to Prato, 220 km (140 mi)

Stage 21 result

Rank	Rider	Team	Time
1	Gianni Bugno (ITA)	Chateau d'Ax	6h 26' 50"
2	Claude Criquielion (BEL)	Hitachi–Zonca	+ 46"
3	Laurent Fignon (FRA)	Super U–Raleigh–Fiat	s.t.
4	Flavio Giupponi (ITA)	Malvor–Sidi	s.t.
5	Andrew Hampsten (USA)	7-Eleven	s.t.
6	Erik Breukink (NED)	Panasonic–Isostar–Colnago–Agu	s.t.
7	Roberto Conti (ITA)	Selca	s.t.
8	Marino Lejarreta (ESP)	Caja Rural	s.t.
9	Vladimir Poulnikov (URS)	Alfa Lum–STM	+ 1' 56"
10	José Salvador Sanchis (ESP)	Caja Rural	s.t.

General classification after Stage 21

Rank	Rider	Team	Time
1	Laurent Fignon (FRA)	Super U–Raleigh–Fiat	92h 22' 21"
2	Flavio Giupponi (ITA)	Malvor–Sidi	+ 1' 34"
3	Andrew Hampsten (USA)	7-Eleven	+ 1' 39"
4	Urs Zimmermann (SUI)	Carrera Jeans–Vagabond	+ 4' 05"
5	Erik Breukink (NED)	Panasonic–Isostar–Colnago–Agu	+ 4' 32"
6	Franco Chioccioli (ITA)	Del Tongo	+ 5' 27"
7	Roberto Conti (ITA)	Selca	+ 5' 48"
8	Marino Lejarreta (ESP)	Caja Rural	+ 5' 50"
9	Stephen Roche (IRL)	Fagor–MBK	+ 5' 53"
10	Claude Criquielion (BEL)	Hitachi–Zonca	+ 6' 14"

== Stage 22 ==
11 June 1989 — Prato to Florence, 53.8 km (33.4 mi) (ITT)

Stage 22 result

Rank	Rider	Team	Time
1	Lech Piasecki (POL)	Malvor–Sidi	1h 05' 34"
2	Greg LeMond (USA)	AD Renting–W-Cup–Bottecchia	+ 1' 03"
3	Flavio Giupponi (ITA)	Malvor–Sidi	+ 2' 05"
4	Vladimir Poulnikov (URS)	Alfa Lum–STM	+ 2' 15"
5	Laurent Fignon (FRA)	Super U–Raleigh–Fiat	+ 2' 21"
6	Franco Chioccioli (ITA)	Del Tongo	+ 2' 37"
7	Claude Criquielion (BEL)	Hitachi–Zonca	+ 2' 49"
8	Erik Breukink (NED)	Panasonic–Isostar–Colnago–Agu	+ 2' 51"
9	Czesław Lang (POL)	Malvor–Sidi	+ 3' 04"
10	Maurizio Fondriest (ITA)	Del Tongo	+ 3' 08"

General classification after Stage 22

Rank	Rider	Team	Time
1	Laurent Fignon (FRA)	Super U–Raleigh–Fiat	93h 30' 16"
2	Flavio Giupponi (ITA)	Malvor–Sidi	+ 1' 15"
3	Andrew Hampsten (USA)	7-Eleven	+ 2' 46"
4	Erik Breukink (NED)	Panasonic–Isostar–Colnago–Agu	+ 5' 02"
5	Franco Chioccioli (ITA)	Del Tongo	+ 5' 43"
6	Urs Zimmermann (SUI)	Carrera Jeans–Vagabond	+ 6' 28"
7	Claude Criquielion (BEL)	Hitachi–Zonca	+ 6' 34"
8	Marco Giovannetti (ITA)	Seur	+ 7' 44"
9	Stephen Roche (IRL)	Fagor–MBK	s.t.
10	Marino Lejarreta (ESP)	Caja Rural	+ 8' 09"
