= 1989 Giro d'Italia, Stage 1 to Stage 12 =

72nd edition of the Giro d'Italia

The 1989 Giro d'Italia was the 72nd edition of the Giro d'Italia, one of cycling's Grand Tours. The Giro began in Taormina, with a flat stage on 21 May, and Stage 12 occurred on 1 June with a stage to Mira. The race finished in Florence on 11 June.

== Stage 1 ==
21 May 1989 — Taormina to Catania, 123 km (76 mi)

Stage 1 result and general classification after Stage 1

Rank	Rider	Team	Time
1	Jean-Paul van Poppel (NED)	Panasonic–Isostar–Colnago–Agu	2h 43' 35"
2	Giovanni Fidanza (ITA)	Chateau d'Ax	s.t.
3	Adriano Baffi (ITA)	Ariostea	s.t.
4	Maurizio Fondriest (ITA)	Del Tongo	s.t.
5	Frank Hoste (BEL)	AD Renting–W-Cup–Bottecchia	s.t.
6	Rolf Sørensen (DEN)	Ariostea	s.t.
7	Fabiano Fontanelli (ITA)	Selca	s.t.
8	Luciano Boffo (ITA)	Jolly Componibili–Club 88	s.t.
9	Silvio Martinello (ITA)	Atala–Campagnolo	s.t.
10	Davis Phinney (USA)	7-Eleven	s.t.

== Stage 2 ==
22 May 1989 — Catania to Mount Etna, 132 km (82 mi)

Stage 2 result

Rank	Rider	Team	Time
1	Acácio da Silva (POR)	Carrera Jeans–Vagabond	3h 32' 38"
2	Luis Herrera (COL)	Café de Colombia	s.t.
3	Tony Rominger (SUI)	Chateau d'Ax	s.t.
4	Marino Lejarreta (ESP)	Caja Rural	+ 4"
5	Ivan Ivanov (URS)	Alfa Lum–STM	s.t.
6	Laurent Fignon (FRA)	Super U–Raleigh–Fiat	s.t.
7	Silvano Contini (ITA)	Malvor–Sidi	s.t.
8	Gianni Bugno (ITA)	Chateau d'Ax	s.t.
9	Claude Criquielion (BEL)	Hitachi–Zonca	s.t.
10	Piotr Ugrumov (URS)	Alfa Lum–STM	s.t.

General classification after Stage 2

Rank	Rider	Team	Time
1	Acácio da Silva (POR)	Carrera Jeans–Vagabond	6h 15' 58"
2	Luis Herrera (COL)	Café de Colombia	+ 8"
3	Tony Rominger (SUI)	Chateau d'Ax	+ 12"
4	Piotr Ugrumov (URS)	Alfa Lum–STM	+ 19"
5	Gianni Bugno (ITA)	Chateau d'Ax	s.t.
6	Laurent Fignon (FRA)	Super U–Raleigh–Fiat	s.t.
7	Marino Lejarreta (ESP)	Caja Rural	s.t.
8	Stephen Roche (IRL)	Fagor–MBK	s.t.
9	Claude Criquielion (BEL)	Hitachi–Zonca	s.t.
10	Silvano Contini (ITA)	Malvor–Sidi	s.t.

== Stage 3 ==
23 May 1989 — Villafranca Tirrena to Messina, 32.5 km (20.2 mi) (TTT)

Stage 3 result

Rank	Team	Time
1	Ariostea	37' 00"
2	Malvor–Sidi	+ 16"
3	Panasonic–Isostar–Colnago–Agu	+ 24"
4	Del Tongo	+ 34"
5	Carrera Jeans–Vagabond	+ 49"
6	TVM–Ragno	+ 1' 03"
7	Super U–Raleigh–Fiat	+ 1' 05"
8	Atala–Campagnolo	+ 1' 07"
9	Gewiss–Bianchi	+ 1' 08"
10	Fagor–MBK	+ 1' 11"

General classification after Stage 3

Rank	Rider	Team	Time
1	Silvano Contini (ITA)	Malvor–Sidi	6h 53' 33"
2	Acácio da Silva (POR)	Carrera Jeans–Vagabond	+ 14"
3	Flavio Giupponi (ITA)	Malvor–Sidi	+ 15"
4	Erik Breukink (NED)	Panasonic–Isostar–Colnago–Agu	+ 23"
5	Maurizio Fondriest (ITA)	Del Tongo	+ 27"
6	Urs Zimmermann (SUI)	Carrera Jeans–Vagabond	+ 48"
7	Laurent Fignon (FRA)	Super U–Raleigh–Fiat	+ 49"
8	Stephen Roche (IRL)	Fagor–MBK	+ 55"
9	Alberto Elli (ITA)	Ariostea	+ 57"
10	Tony Rominger (SUI)	Chateau d'Ax	+ 58"

== Stage 4 ==
24 May 1989 — Scilla to Cosenza, 204 km (127 mi)

Stage 4 result

Rank	Rider	Team	Time
1	Rolf Järmann (SUI)	Frank–Toyo–Magniflex	5h 59' 40"
2	Rolf Sørensen (DEN)	Ariostea	+ 14"
3	Acácio da Silva (POR)	Carrera Jeans–Vagabond	s.t.
4	Luciano Boffo (ITA)	Jolly Componibili–Club 88	s.t.
5	Giuseppe Saronni (ITA)	Malvor–Sidi	s.t.
6	Salvatore Cavallero (ITA)	Seur	s.t.
7	Silvio Martinello (ITA)	Atala–Campagnolo	s.t.
8	Greg LeMond (USA)	AD Renting–W-Cup–Bottecchia	s.t.
9	Angelo Canzonieri (ITA)	Pepsi-Cola–Alba Cucine	s.t.
10	Davide Cassani (ITA)	Gewiss–Bianchi	s.t.

General classification after Stage 4

Rank	Rider	Team	Time
1	Silvano Contini (ITA)	Malvor–Sidi	12h 53' 27"
2	Acácio da Silva (POR)	Carrera Jeans–Vagabond	+ 11"
3	Flavio Giupponi (ITA)	Malvor–Sidi	+ 15"
4	Erik Breukink (NED)	Panasonic–Isostar–Colnago–Agu	+ 23"
5	Maurizio Fondriest (ITA)	Del Tongo	+ 49"
6	Urs Zimmermann (SUI)	Carrera Jeans–Vagabond	+ 48"
7	Laurent Fignon (FRA)	Super U–Raleigh–Fiat	+ 49"
8	Stephen Roche (IRL)	Fagor–MBK	+ 55"
9	Alberto Elli (ITA)	Ariostea	+ 57"
10	Tony Rominger (SUI)	Chateau d'Ax	+ 58"

== Stage 5 ==
25 May 1989 — Cosenza to Potenza, 275 km (171 mi)

Stage 5 result

Rank	Rider	Team	Time
1	Stefano Giuliani (ITA)	Jolly Componibili–Club 88	8h 20' 49"
2	Maurizio Fondriest (ITA)	Del Tongo	+ 44"
3	Phil Anderson (AUS)	TVM–Ragno	s.t.
4	Rolf Sørensen (DEN)	Ariostea	s.t.
5	Dimitri Konyshev (URS)	Alfa Lum–STM	s.t.
6	Acácio da Silva (POR)	Carrera Jeans–Vagabond	s.t.
7	Flavio Giupponi (ITA)	Malvor–Sidi	s.t.
8	Jesús Blanco Villar (ESP)	Seur	s.t.
9	Piotr Ugrumov (URS)	Alfa Lum–STM	s.t.
10	Silvano Contini (ITA)	Malvor–Sidi	s.t.

General classification after Stage 5

Rank	Rider	Team	Time
1	Silvano Contini (ITA)	Malvor–Sidi	21h 14' 16"
2	Acácio da Silva (POR)	Carrera Jeans–Vagabond	+ 11"
3	Flavio Giupponi (ITA)	Malvor–Sidi	+ 15"
4	Erik Breukink (NED)	Panasonic–Isostar–Colnago–Agu	+ 23"
5	Maurizio Fondriest (ITA)	Del Tongo	+ 27"
6	Urs Zimmermann (SUI)	Carrera Jeans–Vagabond	+ 48"
7	Laurent Fignon (FRA)	Super U–Raleigh–Fiat	+ 49"
8	Stephen Roche (IRL)	Fagor–MBK	+ 55"
9	Alberto Elli (ITA)	Ariostea	+ 57"
10	Tony Rominger (SUI)	Chateau d'Ax	+ 58"

== Stage 6 ==
26 May 1989 — Potenza to Campobasso, 223 km (139 mi)

Stage 6 result

Rank	Rider	Team	Time
1	Stephan Joho (SUI)	Ariostea	6h 06' 45"
2	Claudio Chiappucci (ITA)	Carrera Jeans–Vagabond	+ 3' 15"
3	Ennio Salvador (ITA)	Gewiss–Bianchi	+ 3' 19"
4	Maurizio Fondriest (ITA)	Del Tongo	+ 3' 20"
5	Johan van der Velde (NED)	TVM–Ragno	s.t.
6	Jürg Bruggmann (SUI)	Frank–Toyo–Magniflex	s.t.
7	Acácio da Silva (POR)	Carrera Jeans–Vagabond	s.t.
8	Fabiano Fontanelli (ITA)	Selca	s.t.
9	Rolf Sørensen (DEN)	Ariostea	s.t.
10	Dimitri Konyshev (URS)	Alfa Lum–STM	s.t.

General classification after Stage 6

Rank	Rider	Team	Time
1	Silvano Contini (ITA)	Malvor–Sidi	27h 25' 05"
2	Acácio da Silva (POR)	Carrera Jeans–Vagabond	+ 11"
3	Flavio Giupponi (ITA)	Malvor–Sidi	+ 15"
4	Maurizio Fondriest (ITA)	Del Tongo	+ 20"
5	Erik Breukink (NED)	Panasonic–Isostar–Colnago–Agu	+ 23"
6	Urs Zimmermann (SUI)	Carrera Jeans–Vagabond	+ 48"
7	Laurent Fignon (FRA)	Super U–Raleigh–Fiat	+ 49"
8	Stephen Roche (IRL)	Fagor–MBK	+ 55"
9	Alberto Elli (ITA)	Ariostea	+ 57"
10	Tony Rominger (SUI)	Chateau d'Ax	+ 58"

== Stage 7 ==
27 May 1989 — Isernia to Rome, 208 km (129 mi)

Stage 7 result

Rank	Rider	Team	Time
1	Urs Freuler (SUI)	Panasonic–Isostar–Colnago–Agu	5h 31' 13"
2	Mario Cipollini (ITA)	Del Tongo	s.t.
3	Giovanni Fidanza (ITA)	Chateau d'Ax	s.t.
4	Paolo Rosola (ITA)	Gewiss–Bianchi	s.t.
5	Davis Phinney (USA)	7-Eleven	s.t.
6	Alessio Di Basco (ITA)	Pepsi-Cola–Alba Cucine	s.t.
7	Stefano Allocchio (ITA)	Malvor–Sidi	s.t.
8	Frank Hoste (BEL)	AD Renting–W-Cup–Bottecchia	s.t.
9	Peter Pieters (NED)	TVM–Ragno	s.t.
10	Maurizio Fondriest (ITA)	Del Tongo	s.t.

General classification after Stage 7

Rank	Rider	Team	Time
1	Silvano Contini (ITA)	Malvor–Sidi	32h 56' 18"
2	Acácio da Silva (POR)	Carrera Jeans–Vagabond	+ 11"
3	Flavio Giupponi (ITA)	Malvor–Sidi	+ 15"
4	Maurizio Fondriest (ITA)	Del Tongo	+ 20"
5	Erik Breukink (NED)	Panasonic–Isostar–Colnago–Agu	+ 23"
6	Urs Zimmermann (SUI)	Carrera Jeans–Vagabond	+ 48"
7	Laurent Fignon (FRA)	Super U–Raleigh–Fiat	+ 49"
8	Stephen Roche (IRL)	Fagor–MBK	+ 55"
9	Alberto Elli (ITA)	Ariostea	+ 57"
10	Tony Rominger (SUI)	Chateau d'Ax	+ 58"

== Stage 8 ==
28 May 1989 — Rome to Gran Sasso d'Italia, 179 km (111 mi)

Stage 8 result

Rank	Rider	Team	Time
1	John Carlsen (DEN)	Fagor–MBK	5h 21' 40"
2	Luis Herrera (COL)	Café de Colombia	+ 29"
3	Marino Lejarreta (ESP)	Caja Rural	s.t.
4	Erik Breukink (NED)	Panasonic–Isostar–Colnago–Agu	s.t.
5	Jon Unzaga (ESP)	Seur	s.t.
6	Dimitri Konyshev (URS)	Alfa Lum–STM	s.t.
7	Laurent Fignon (FRA)	Super U–Raleigh–Fiat	s.t.
8	Stephen Roche (IRL)	Fagor–MBK	s.t.
9	Roberto Conti (ITA)	Selca	s.t.
10	Andrew Hampsten (USA)	7-Eleven	s.t.

General classification after Stage 8

Rank	Rider	Team	Time
1	Erik Breukink (NED)	Panasonic–Isostar–Colnago–Agu	38h 18' 50"
2	Acácio da Silva (POR)	Carrera Jeans–Vagabond	+ 1"
3	Silvano Contini (ITA)	Malvor–Sidi	+ 12"
4	Flavio Giupponi (ITA)	Malvor–Sidi	+ 27"
5	Laurent Fignon (FRA)	Super U–Raleigh–Fiat	+ 32"
6	Luis Herrera (COL)	Café de Colombia	+ 35"
7	Stephen Roche (IRL)	Fagor–MBK	+ 38"
8	Urs Zimmermann (SUI)	Carrera Jeans–Vagabond	s.t.
9	Maurizio Fondriest (ITA)	Del Tongo	+ 42"
10	Piotr Ugrumov (URS)	Alfa Lum–STM	+ 49"

== Stage 9 ==
29 May 1989 — L'Aquila to Gubbio, 221 km (137 mi)

Stage 9 result

Rank	Rider	Team	Time
1	Bjarne Riis (DEN)	Super U–Raleigh–Fiat	6h 00' 15"
2	Dimitri Konyshev (URS)	Alfa Lum–STM	s.t.
3	Enrico Galleschi (ITA)	Pepsi-Cola–Alba Cucine	s.t.
4	Werner Stutz (SUI)	Frank–Toyo–Magniflex	+ 10"
5	Salvatore Cavallero (ITA)	Seur	s.t.
6	Gianni Bugno (ITA)	Chateau d'Ax	s.t.
7	Mauro Santaromita (ITA)	Pepsi-Cola–Alba Cucine	s.t.
8	Rolf Sørensen (DEN)	Ariostea	+ 20"
9	Giovanni Fidanza (ITA)	Chateau d'Ax	+ 27"
10	Acácio da Silva (POR)	Carrera Jeans–Vagabond	s.t.

General classification after Stage 9

Rank	Rider	Team	Time
1	Acácio da Silva (POR)	Carrera Jeans–Vagabond	44h 19' 28"
2	Erik Breukink (NED)	Panasonic–Isostar–Colnago–Agu	+ 4"
3	Silvano Contini (ITA)	Malvor–Sidi	+ 16"
4	Flavio Giupponi (ITA)	Malvor–Sidi	+ 31"
5	Laurent Fignon (FRA)	Super U–Raleigh–Fiat	+ 36"
6	Luis Herrera (COL)	Café de Colombia	+ 39"
7	Stephen Roche (IRL)	Fagor–MBK	s.t.
8	Urs Zimmermann (SUI)	Carrera Jeans–Vagabond	+ 42"
9	Maurizio Fondriest (ITA)	Del Tongo	+ 44"
10	Piotr Ugrumov (URS)	Alfa Lum–STM	+ 53"

== Stage 10 ==
30 May 1989 — Pesaro to Riccione, 36.8 km (22.9 mi) (ITT)

Stage 10 result

Rank	Rider	Team	Time
1	Lech Piasecki (POL)	Malvor–Sidi	48' 26"
2	Erik Breukink (NED)	Panasonic–Isostar–Colnago–Agu	+ 25"
3	Stephen Roche (IRL)	Fagor–MBK	+ 33"
4	Rolf Sørensen (DEN)	Ariostea	+ 35"
5	Jesper Skibby (DEN)	TVM–Ragno	s.t.
6	Piotr Ugrumov (URS)	Alfa Lum–STM	+ 41"
7	Claude Criquielion (BEL)	Hitachi–Zonca	+ 49"
8	Laurent Fignon (FRA)	Super U–Raleigh–Fiat	+ 54"
9	Andrew Hampsten (USA)	7-Eleven	+ 55"
10	Moreno Argentin (ITA)	Gewiss–Bianchi	+ 57"

General classification after Stage 10

Rank	Rider	Team	Time
1	Erik Breukink (NED)	Panasonic–Isostar–Colnago–Agu	45h 08' 23"
2	Stephen Roche (IRL)	Fagor–MBK	+ 46"
3	Laurent Fignon (FRA)	Super U–Raleigh–Fiat	+ 1' 01"
4	Piotr Ugrumov (URS)	Alfa Lum–STM	+ 1' 05"
5	Flavio Giupponi (ITA)	Malvor–Sidi	+ 1' 23"
6	Maurizio Fondriest (ITA)	Del Tongo	+ 1' 26"
7	Marino Lejarreta (ESP)	Caja Rural	+ 1' 46"
8	Claude Criquielion (BEL)	Hitachi–Zonca	+ 1' 51"
9	Rolf Järmann (SUI)	Frank–Toyo–Magniflex	+ 1' 56"
10	Urs Zimmermann (SUI)	Carrera Jeans–Vagabond	+ 2' 06"

== Stage 11 ==
31 May 1989 — Riccione to Mantua, 244 km (152 mi)

Stage 11 result

Rank	Rider	Team	Time
1	Urs Freuler (SUI)	Panasonic–Isostar–Colnago–Agu	6h 19' 28"
2	Mario Cipollini (ITA)	Del Tongo	s.t.
3	Adriano Baffi (ITA)	Ariostea	s.t.
4	Paolo Rosola (ITA)	Gewiss–Bianchi	s.t.
5	Patrizio Gambirasio (ITA)	Selca	s.t.
6	Marcel Arntz (NED)	Caja Rural	s.t.
7	Phil Anderson (AUS)	TVM–Ragno	s.t.
8	Peter Pieters (NED)	TVM–Ragno	s.t.
9	Stefano Allocchio (ITA)	Malvor–Sidi	s.t.
10	Rolf Sørensen (DEN)	Ariostea	s.t.

General classification after Stage 11

Rank	Rider	Team	Time
1	Erik Breukink (NED)	Panasonic–Isostar–Colnago–Agu	51h 27' 59"
2	Stephen Roche (IRL)	Fagor–MBK	+ 46"
3	Laurent Fignon (FRA)	Super U–Raleigh–Fiat	+ 1' 01"
4	Piotr Ugrumov (URS)	Alfa Lum–STM	+ 1' 05"
5	Flavio Giupponi (ITA)	Malvor–Sidi	+ 1' 23"
6	Maurizio Fondriest (ITA)	Del Tongo	+ 1' 26"
7	Claude Criquielion (BEL)	Hitachi–Zonca	+ 1' 43"
8	Marino Lejarreta (ESP)	Caja Rural	+ 1' 46"
9	Rolf Järmann (SUI)	Frank–Toyo–Magniflex	+ 1' 48"
10	Urs Zimmermann (SUI)	Carrera Jeans–Vagabond	+ 2' 06"

== Stage 12 ==
1 June 1989 — Mantua to Mira, 148 km (92 mi)

Stage 12 result

Rank	Rider	Team	Time
1	Mario Cipollini (ITA)	Del Tongo	3h 41' 04"
2	José Rodríguez García (ESP)	Seur	s.t.
3	Jean-Paul van Poppel (NED)	Panasonic–Isostar–Colnago–Agu	s.t.
4	Silvio Martinello (ITA)	Atala–Campagnolo	s.t.
5	Adriano Baffi (ITA)	Ariostea	s.t.
6	Paolo Rosola (ITA)	Gewiss–Bianchi	s.t.
7	Stefano Allocchio (ITA)	Malvor–Sidi	s.t.
8	Francesco Rossignoli (ITA)	Fagor–MBK	s.t.
9	Fabiano Fontanelli (ITA)	Selca	s.t.
10	Marcel Arntz (NED)	Caja Rural	s.t.

General classification after Stage 12

Rank	Rider	Team	Time
1	Erik Breukink (NED)	Panasonic–Isostar–Colnago–Agu	55h 09' 03"
2	Stephen Roche (IRL)	Fagor–MBK	+ 46"
3	Laurent Fignon (FRA)	Super U–Raleigh–Fiat	+ 1' 01"
4	Piotr Ugrumov (URS)	Alfa Lum–STM	+ 1' 05"
5	Flavio Giupponi (ITA)	Malvor–Sidi	+ 1' 23"
6	Maurizio Fondriest (ITA)	Del Tongo	+ 1' 26"
7	Claude Criquielion (BEL)	Hitachi–Zonca	+ 1' 43"
8	Marino Lejarreta (ESP)	Caja Rural	+ 1' 46"
9	Rolf Järmann (SUI)	Frank–Toyo–Magniflex	+ 1' 48"
10	Urs Zimmermann (SUI)	Carrera Jeans–Vagabond	+ 2' 06"
