= 1987 Giro d'Italia, Stage 11 to Stage 22 =

Cycling race stages

The 1987 Giro d'Italia was the 70th edition of the Giro d'Italia, one of cycling's Grand Tours. The Giro began in San Remo, with a prologue individual time trial on 21 May, and Stage 11 occurred on 2 June with a stage from Giulianova. The race finished in Saint-Vincent on 13 June.

== Stage 11 ==
2 June 1987 — Giulianova to Osimo, 245 km (152 mi)

Stage 11 result

| Rank | Rider | Team | Time |
|---|---|---|---|
| 1 | Robert Forest (FRA) | Fagor–MBK | 6h 44' 12" |
| 2 | Romano Randi (ITA) | Selca | + 12" |
| 3 | Lars Wahlqvist (SWE) | Gewiss–Bianchi | + 20" |
| 4 | Alberto Elli (ITA) | Remac-Fanini | + 30" |
| 5 | Rodolfo Massi (ITA) | Magniflex–Centroscarpa | s.t. |
| 6 | Emanuele Bombini (ITA) | Gewiss–Bianchi | + 34" |
| 7 | Pascal Jules (FRA) | Caja Rural–Orbea | + 45" |
| 8 | Gerhard Zadrobilek (AUT) | Supermercati Brianzoli–Chateau d'Ax | + 47" |
| 9 | Moreno Argentin (ITA) | Gewiss–Bianchi | + 49" |
| 10 | Marino Lejarreta (ESP) | Caja Rural–Orbea | s.t. |

General classification after Stage 11

| Rank | Rider | Team | Time |
|---|---|---|---|
| 1 | Stephen Roche (IRL) | Carrera Jeans–Vagabond | 51h 15' 05" |
| 2 | Roberto Visentini (ITA) | Carrera Jeans–Vagabond | + 25" |
| 3 | Erik Breukink (NED) | Panasonic–Isostar | + 1' 35" |
| 4 | Roberto Pagnin (ITA) | Gewiss–Bianchi | + 1' 43" |
| 5 | Robert Millar (GBR) | Panasonic–Isostar | + 2' 18" |
| 6 | Tony Rominger (SUI) | Supermercati Brianzoli–Chateau d'Ax | + 2' 21" |
| 7 | Flavio Giupponi (ITA) | Del Tongo | s.t. |
| 8 | Phil Anderson (AUS) | Panasonic–Isostar | + 2' 37" |
| 9 | Davide Cassani (ITA) | Carrera Jeans–Vagabond | + 2' 52" |
| 10 | Peter Winnen (NED) | Panasonic–Isostar | + 2' 58" |

== Stage 12 ==
3 June 1987 — Osimo to Bellaria, 197 km (122 mi)

Stage 12 result

| Rank | Rider | Team | Time |
|---|---|---|---|
| 1 | Guido Bontempi (ITA) | Carrera Jeans–Vagabond | 4h 54' 20" |
| 2 | Adriano Baffi (ITA) | Gis Gelati–Jollyscarpe | s.t. |
| 3 | Paolo Rosola (ITA) | Gewiss–Bianchi | s.t. |
| 4 | Flavio Chesini (ITA) | Magniflex–Centroscarpa | s.t. |
| 5 | Urs Freuler (SUI) | Atala–Ofmega | s.t. |
| 6 | Eddy Planckaert (BEL) | Panasonic–Isostar | s.t. |
| 7 | Silvano Riccò (ITA) | Fibok | s.t. |
| 8 | Stefano Allocchio (ITA) | Supermercati Brianzoli–Chateau d'Ax | s.t. |
| 9 | Christian Chaubet (FRA) | Fagor–MBK | s.t. |
| 10 | Johan van der Velde (NED) | Gis Gelati–Jollyscarpe | s.t. |

General classification after Stage 12

| Rank | Rider | Team | Time |
|---|---|---|---|
| 1 | Stephen Roche (IRL) | Carrera Jeans–Vagabond | 56h 09' 25" |
| 2 | Roberto Visentini (ITA) | Carrera Jeans–Vagabond | + 25" |
| 3 | Erik Breukink (NED) | Panasonic–Isostar | + 1' 35" |
| 4 | Roberto Pagnin (ITA) | Gewiss–Bianchi | + 1' 43" |
| 5 | Robert Millar (GBR) | Panasonic–Isostar | + 2' 18" |
| 6 | Tony Rominger (SUI) | Supermercati Brianzoli–Chateau d'Ax | + 2' 21" |
| 7 | Flavio Giupponi (ITA) | Del Tongo | s.t. |
| 8 | Phil Anderson (AUS) | Panasonic–Isostar | + 2' 37" |
| 9 | Davide Cassani (ITA) | Carrera Jeans–Vagabond | + 2' 52" |
| 10 | Peter Winnen (NED) | Panasonic–Isostar | + 2' 58" |

== Stage 13 ==
4 June 1987 — Rimini to San Marino, 46 km (29 mi) (ITT)

Stage 13 result

| Rank | Rider | Team | Time |
|---|---|---|---|
| 1 | Roberto Visentini (ITA) | Carrera Jeans–Vagabond | 1h 11' 39" |
| 2 | Tony Rominger (SUI) | Supermercati Brianzoli–Chateau d'Ax | + 1' 11" |
| 3 | Lech Piasecki (POL) | Del Tongo | + 1' 20" |
| 4 | Jean-François Bernard (FRA) | Toshiba–Look | + 1' 32" |
| 5 | Marino Lejarreta (ESP) | Caja Rural–Orbea | + 1' 55" |
| 6 | Erik Breukink (NED) | Panasonic–Isostar | + 2' 00" |
| 7 | Maurizio Fondriest (ITA) | Ecoflam–BFB Bruciatori–Mareco–Alfa Lum | + 2' 13" |
| 8 | Dietrich Thurau (FRG) | Roland | + 2' 27" |
| 9 | Jiří Škoda (CZE) | Ecoflam–BFB Bruciatori–Mareco–Alfa Lum | + 2' 29" |
| 10 | Jokin Mújika (ESP) | Caja Rural–Orbea | + 2' 41" |

General classification after Stage 13

| Rank | Rider | Team | Time |
|---|---|---|---|
| 1 | Roberto Visentini (ITA) | Carrera Jeans–Vagabond | 57h 21' 09" |
| 2 | Stephen Roche (IRL) | Carrera Jeans–Vagabond | + 2' 42" |
| 3 | Tony Rominger (SUI) | Supermercati Brianzoli–Chateau d'Ax | + 3' 12" |
| 4 | Erik Breukink (NED) | Panasonic–Isostar | + 3' 30" |
| 5 | Robert Millar (GBR) | Panasonic–Isostar | + 4' 55" |
| 6 | Flavio Giupponi (ITA) | Del Tongo | + 5' 37" |
| 7 | Marino Lejarreta (ESP) | Caja Rural–Orbea | + 5' 59" |
| 8 | Phil Anderson (AUS) | Panasonic–Isostar | + 6' 17" |
| 9 | Emanuele Bombini (ITA) | Gewiss–Bianchi | + 6' 29" |
| 10 | Roberto Pagnin (ITA) | Gewiss–Bianchi | + 6' 45" |

== Stage 14 ==
5 June 1987 — San Marino to Lido di Jesolo, 260 km (160 mi)

Stage 14 result

| Rank | Rider | Team | Time |
|---|---|---|---|
| 1 | Paolo Cimini (ITA) | Remac-Fanini | 6h 54' 30" |
| 2 | Paolo Rosola (ITA) | Gewiss–Bianchi | s.t. |
| 3 | Paul Popp (AUT) | Paini–Bottecchia–Sidi | s.t. |
| 4 | Johan Capiot (BEL) | Roland | s.t. |
| 5 | Luciano Boffo (ITA) | Ecoflam–BFB Bruciatori–Mareco–Alfa Lum | s.t. |
| 6 | Silvano Riccò (ITA) | Fibok | s.t. |
| 7 | Guido Bontempi (ITA) | Carrera Jeans–Vagabond | s.t. |
| 8 | Alessio Di Basco (ITA) | Remac-Fanini | s.t. |
| 9 | Peter Pieters (NED) | Transvemij-Van Schilt | s.t. |
| 10 | Stefano Zanatta (ITA) | Supermercati Brianzoli–Chateau d'Ax | s.t. |

General classification after Stage 14

| Rank | Rider | Team | Time |
|---|---|---|---|
| 1 | Roberto Visentini (ITA) | Carrera Jeans–Vagabond | 64h 15' 39" |
| 2 | Stephen Roche (IRL) | Carrera Jeans–Vagabond | + 2' 42" |
| 3 | Tony Rominger (SUI) | Supermercati Brianzoli–Chateau d'Ax | + 3' 12" |
| 4 | Erik Breukink (NED) | Panasonic–Isostar | + 3' 30" |
| 5 | Robert Millar (GBR) | Panasonic–Isostar | + 4' 55" |
| 6 | Flavio Giupponi (ITA) | Del Tongo | + 5' 37" |
| 7 | Marino Lejarreta (ESP) | Caja Rural–Orbea | + 5' 59" |
| 8 | Phil Anderson (AUS) | Panasonic–Isostar | + 6' 17" |
| 9 | Emanuele Bombini (ITA) | Gewiss–Bianchi | + 6' 29" |
| 10 | Roberto Pagnin (ITA) | Gewiss–Bianchi | + 6' 45" |

== Stage 15 ==
6 June 1987 — Lido di Jesolo to Sappada, 224 km (139 mi)

Stage 15 result

| Rank | Rider | Team | Time |
|---|---|---|---|
| 1 | Johan van der Velde (NED) | Gis Gelati–Jollyscarpe | 6h 17' 46" |
| 2 | Tony Rominger (SUI) | Supermercati Brianzoli–Chateau d'Ax | + 46" |
| 3 | Flavio Giupponi (ITA) | Del Tongo | s.t. |
| 4 | Robert Millar (GBR) | Panasonic–Isostar | s.t. |
| 5 | Erik Breukink (NED) | Panasonic–Isostar | s.t. |
| 6 | Marino Lejarreta (ESP) | Caja Rural–Orbea | s.t. |
| 7 | Pedro Muñoz (ESP) | Fagor–MBK | s.t. |
| 8 | Steve Bauer (CAN) | Toshiba–Look | + 56" |
| 9 | Roberto Conti (ITA) | Selca | s.t. |
| 10 | Moreno Argentin (ITA) | Gewiss–Bianchi | s.t. |

General classification after Stage 15

| Rank | Rider | Team | Time |
|---|---|---|---|
| 1 | Stephen Roche (IRL) | Carrera Jeans–Vagabond | 70h 37' 03" |
| 2 | Tony Rominger (SUI) | Supermercati Brianzoli–Chateau d'Ax | + 5" |
| 3 | Erik Breukink (NED) | Panasonic–Isostar | + 38" |
| 4 | Robert Millar (GBR) | Panasonic–Isostar | + 1' 58" |
| 5 | Flavio Giupponi (ITA) | Del Tongo | + 2' 35" |
| 6 | Marino Lejarreta (ESP) | Caja Rural–Orbea | + 3' 07" |
| 7 | Roberto Visentini (ITA) | Carrera Jeans–Vagabond | + 3' 12" |
| 8 | Phil Anderson (AUS) | Panasonic–Isostar | + 4' 04" |
| 9 | Moreno Argentin (ITA) | Gewiss–Bianchi | + 4' 14" |
| 10 | Steve Bauer (CAN) | Toshiba–Look | + 4' 37" |

== Stage 16 ==
7 June 1987 — Sappada to Canazei, 211 km (131 mi)

Stage 16 result

| Rank | Rider | Team | Time |
|---|---|---|---|
| 1 | Johan van der Velde (NED) | Gis Gelati–Jollyscarpe | 6h 16' 28" |
| 2 | Erik Breukink (NED) | Panasonic–Isostar | + 1' 36" |
| 3 | Stephen Roche (IRL) | Carrera Jeans–Vagabond | s.t. |
| 4 | Marino Lejarreta (ESP) | Caja Rural–Orbea | s.t. |
| 5 | Alberto Volpi (ITA) | Gewiss–Bianchi | s.t. |
| 6 | Jokin Mújika (ESP) | Caja Rural–Orbea | s.t. |
| 7 | Roberto Visentini (ITA) | Carrera Jeans–Vagabond | s.t. |
| 8 | Pedro Muñoz (ESP) | Fagor–MBK | s.t. |
| 9 | Flavio Giupponi (ITA) | Del Tongo | s.t. |
| 10 | Robert Millar (GBR) | Panasonic–Isostar | s.t. |

General classification after Stage 16

| Rank | Rider | Team | Time |
|---|---|---|---|
| 1 | Stephen Roche (IRL) | Carrera Jeans–Vagabond | 76h 55' 46" |
| 2 | Erik Breukink (NED) | Panasonic–Isostar | + 33" |
| 3 | Tony Rominger (SUI) | Supermercati Brianzoli–Chateau d'Ax | + 1' 22" |
| 4 | Robert Millar (GBR) | Panasonic–Isostar | + 2' 08" |
| 5 | Flavio Giupponi (ITA) | Del Tongo | + 2' 45" |
| 6 | Marino Lejarreta (ESP) | Caja Rural–Orbea | + 3' 12" |
| 7 | Roberto Visentini (ITA) | Carrera Jeans–Vagabond | + 3' 24" |
| 8 | Moreno Argentin (ITA) | Gewiss–Bianchi | + 4' 09" |
| 9 | Johan van der Velde (NED) | Gis Gelati–Jollyscarpe | + 4' 29" |
| 10 | Jokin Mújika (ESP) | Caja Rural–Orbea | + 5' 10" |

== Stage 17 ==
8 June 1987 — Canazei to Riva del Garda, 206 km (128 mi)

Stage 17 result

| Rank | Rider | Team | Time |
|---|---|---|---|
| 1 | Marco Vitali (ITA) | Atala–Ofmega | 5h 42' 52" |
| 2 | Alessandro Paganessi (ITA) | Ariostea–Gres | s.t. |
| 3 | Marco Giovannetti (ITA) | Gis Gelati–Jollyscarpe | s.t. |
| 4 | Benny Van Brabant (BEL) | Selca | + 4' 43" |
| 5 | Christian Jourdan (FRA) | Toshiba–Look | + 7' 05" |
| 6 | Urs Freuler (SUI) | Atala–Ofmega | + 8' 37" |
| 7 | Johan van der Velde (NED) | Gis Gelati–Jollyscarpe | s.t. |
| 8 | Marino Lejarreta (ESP) | Caja Rural–Orbea | s.t. |
| 9 | Stephen Roche (IRL) | Carrera Jeans–Vagabond | s.t. |
| 10 | Jokin Mújika (ESP) | Caja Rural–Orbea | s.t. |

General classification after Stage 17

| Rank | Rider | Team | Time |
|---|---|---|---|
| 1 | Stephen Roche (IRL) | Carrera Jeans–Vagabond | 82h 47' 10" |
| 2 | Erik Breukink (NED) | Panasonic–Isostar | + 33" |
| 3 | Robert Millar (GBR) | Panasonic–Isostar | + 2' 08" |
| 4 | Flavio Giupponi (ITA) | Del Tongo | + 2' 45" |
| 5 | Marco Giovannetti (ITA) | Gis Gelati–Jollyscarpe | + 3' 08" |
| 6 | Marino Lejarreta (ESP) | Caja Rural–Orbea | + 3' 12" |
| 7 | Roberto Visentini (ITA) | Carrera Jeans–Vagabond | + 3' 24" |
| 8 | Tony Rominger (SUI) | Supermercati Brianzoli–Chateau d'Ax | + 3' 33" |
| 9 | Johan van der Velde (NED) | Gis Gelati–Jollyscarpe | + 4' 29" |
| 10 | Jokin Mújika (ESP) | Caja Rural–Orbea | + 5' 10" |

== Stage 18 ==
9 June 1987 — Riva del Garda to Trescore Balneario, 213 km (132 mi)

Stage 18 result

| Rank | Rider | Team | Time |
|---|---|---|---|
| 1 | Giuseppe Calcaterra (ITA) | Atala–Ofmega | 6h 01' 07" |
| 2 | Paolo Rosola (ITA) | Gewiss–Bianchi | s.t. |
| 3 | Johan van der Velde (NED) | Gis Gelati–Jollyscarpe | s.t. |
| 4 | Alessio Di Basco (ITA) | Remac-Fanini | s.t. |
| 5 | Silvano Riccò (ITA) | Fibok | s.t. |
| 6 | Eddy Planckaert (BEL) | Panasonic–Isostar | s.t. |
| 7 | Dante Morandi (ITA) | Atala–Ofmega | s.t. |
| 8 | Adriano Baffi (ITA) | Gis Gelati–Jollyscarpe | s.t. |
| 9 | Phil Anderson (AUS) | Panasonic–Isostar | s.t. |
| 10 | Johan Capiot (BEL) | Roland | s.t. |

General classification after Stage 18

| Rank | Rider | Team | Time |
|---|---|---|---|
| 1 | Stephen Roche (IRL) | Carrera Jeans–Vagabond | 88h 48' 57" |
| 2 | Erik Breukink (NED) | Panasonic–Isostar | + 33" |
| 3 | Robert Millar (GBR) | Panasonic–Isostar | + 2' 08" |
| 4 | Flavio Giupponi (ITA) | Del Tongo | + 2' 45" |
| 5 | Marco Giovannetti (ITA) | Gis Gelati–Jollyscarpe | + 3' 08" |
| 6 | Marino Lejarreta (ESP) | Caja Rural–Orbea | + 3' 12" |
| 7 | Roberto Visentini (ITA) | Carrera Jeans–Vagabond | + 3' 24" |
| 8 | Tony Rominger (SUI) | Supermercati Brianzoli–Chateau d'Ax | + 3' 33" |
| 9 | Johan van der Velde (NED) | Gis Gelati–Jollyscarpe | + 4' 19" |
| 10 | Peter Winnen (NED) | Panasonic–Isostar | + 5' 48" |

== Stage 19 ==
10 June 1987 — Trescore Balneario to Madesimo, 160 km (99 mi)

Stage 19 result

| Rank | Rider | Team | Time |
|---|---|---|---|
| 1 | Jean-François Bernard (FRA) | Toshiba–Look | 4h 58' 20" |
| 2 | Robert Millar (GBR) | Panasonic–Isostar | + 1' 14" |
| 3 | Marino Lejarreta (ESP) | Caja Rural–Orbea | + 1' 16" |
| 4 | Johan van der Velde (NED) | Gis Gelati–Jollyscarpe | + 1' 32" |
| 5 | Erik Breukink (NED) | Panasonic–Isostar | s.t. |
| 6 | Eddy Schepers (BEL) | Carrera Jeans–Vagabond | s.t. |
| 7 | Stephen Roche (IRL) | Carrera Jeans–Vagabond | s.t. |
| 8 | Roberto Visentini (ITA) | Carrera Jeans–Vagabond | s.t. |
| 9 | Pedro Muñoz (ESP) | Fagor–MBK | s.t. |
| 10 | Flavio Giupponi (ITA) | Del Tongo | + 1' 50" |

General classification after Stage 19

| Rank | Rider | Team | Time |
|---|---|---|---|
| 1 | Stephen Roche (IRL) | Carrera Jeans–Vagabond | 93h 48' 49" |
| 2 | Erik Breukink (NED) | Panasonic–Isostar | + 33" |
| 3 | Robert Millar (GBR) | Panasonic–Isostar | + 1' 35" |
| 4 | Marino Lejarreta (ESP) | Caja Rural–Orbea | + 2' 46" |
| 5 | Flavio Giupponi (ITA) | Del Tongo | + 3' 03" |
| 6 | Roberto Visentini (ITA) | Carrera Jeans–Vagabond | + 3' 24" |
| 7 | Johan van der Velde (NED) | Gis Gelati–Jollyscarpe | + 4' 14" |
| 8 | Marco Giovannetti (ITA) | Gis Gelati–Jollyscarpe | + 4' 36" |
| 9 | Peter Winnen (NED) | Panasonic–Isostar | + 6' 06" |
| 10 | Phil Anderson (AUS) | Panasonic–Isostar | + 7' 01" |

== Stage 20 ==
11 June 1987 — Madesimo to Como, 156 km (97 mi)

Stage 20 result

| Rank | Rider | Team | Time |
|---|---|---|---|
| 1 | Paolo Rosola (ITA) | Gewiss–Bianchi | 3h 45' 01" |
| 2 | Alberto Volpi (ITA) | Gewiss–Bianchi | s.t. |
| 3 | Eddy Planckaert (BEL) | Panasonic–Isostar | s.t. |
| 4 | Johan van der Velde (NED) | Gis Gelati–Jollyscarpe | s.t. |
| 5 | Franco Chioccioli (ITA) | Gis Gelati–Jollyscarpe | s.t. |
| 6 | Alessio Di Basco (ITA) | Remac-Fanini | s.t. |
| 7 | Flavio Chesini (ITA) | Magniflex–Centroscarpa | s.t. |
| 8 | Luciano Boffo (ITA) | Ecoflam–BFB Bruciatori–Mareco–Alfa Lum | s.t. |
| 9 | Phil Anderson (AUS) | Panasonic–Isostar | s.t. |
| 10 | Paolo Cimini (ITA) | Remac-Fanini | s.t. |

General classification after Stage 20

| Rank | Rider | Team | Time |
|---|---|---|---|
| 1 | Stephen Roche (IRL) | Carrera Jeans–Vagabond | 97h 33' 50" |
| 2 | Erik Breukink (NED) | Panasonic–Isostar | + 33" |
| 3 | Robert Millar (GBR) | Panasonic–Isostar | + 1' 35" |
| 4 | Marino Lejarreta (ESP) | Caja Rural–Orbea | + 2' 46" |
| 5 | Flavio Giupponi (ITA) | Del Tongo | + 3' 03" |
| 6 | Roberto Visentini (ITA) | Carrera Jeans–Vagabond | + 3' 24" |
| 7 | Johan van der Velde (NED) | Gis Gelati–Jollyscarpe | + 4' 09" |
| 8 | Marco Giovannetti (ITA) | Gis Gelati–Jollyscarpe | + 4' 36" |
| 9 | Peter Winnen (NED) | Panasonic–Isostar | + 6' 06" |
| 10 | Phil Anderson (AUS) | Panasonic–Isostar | + 7' 01" |

== Stage 21 ==
12 June 1987 — Como to Pila, 252 km (157 mi)

Stage 21 result

| Rank | Rider | Team | Time |
|---|---|---|---|
| 1 | Robert Millar (GBR) | Panasonic–Isostar | 7h 22' 01" |
| 2 | Stephen Roche (IRL) | Carrera Jeans–Vagabond | + 3" |
| 3 | Marino Lejarreta (ESP) | Caja Rural–Orbea | + 7" |
| 4 | Flavio Giupponi (ITA) | Del Tongo | + 2' 03" |
| 5 | Erik Breukink (NED) | Panasonic–Isostar | + 2' 09" |
| 6 | Eddy Schepers (BEL) | Carrera Jeans–Vagabond | + 2' 21" |
| 7 | Claudio Savini (ITA) | Fibok | + 2' 59" |
| 8 | Maurizio Vandelli (ITA) | Ariostea–Gres | s.t. |
| 9 | Alessandro Pozzi (ITA) | Del Tongo | + 3' 06" |
| 10 | Jokin Mújika (ESP) | Caja Rural–Orbea | s.t. |

General classification after Stage 21

| Rank | Rider | Team | Time |
|---|---|---|---|
| 1 | Stephen Roche (IRL) | Carrera Jeans–Vagabond | 104h 55' 39" |
| 2 | Robert Millar (GBR) | Panasonic–Isostar | + 1' 27" |
| 3 | Erik Breukink (NED) | Panasonic–Isostar | + 2' 54" |
| 4 | Marino Lejarreta (ESP) | Caja Rural–Orbea | + 2' 55" |
| 5 | Flavio Giupponi (ITA) | Del Tongo | + 5' 13" |
| 6 | Marco Giovannetti (ITA) | Gis Gelati–Jollyscarpe | + 8' 00" |
| 7 | Peter Winnen (NED) | Panasonic–Isostar | + 9' 40" |
| 8 | Roberto Visentini (ITA) | Carrera Jeans–Vagabond | + 9' 59" |
| 9 | Phil Anderson (AUS) | Panasonic–Isostar | + 10' 11" |
| 10 | Johan van der Velde (NED) | Gis Gelati–Jollyscarpe | + 10' 30" |

== Stage 22 ==
13 June 1987 — Aosta to Saint-Vincent, 32 km (20 mi) (ITT)

Stage 22 result

| Rank | Rider | Team | Time |
|---|---|---|---|
| 1 | Stephen Roche (IRL) | Carrera Jeans–Vagabond | 44' 23" |
| 2 | Dietrich Thurau (FRG) | Roland | s.t. |
| 3 | Milan Jurčo (CZE) | Supermercati Brianzoli–Chateau d'Ax | + 45" |
| 4 | Lech Piasecki (POL) | Del Tongo | + 59" |
| 5 | Erik Breukink (NED) | Panasonic–Isostar | + 1' 03" |
| 6 | Czesław Lang (POL) | Del Tongo | + 1' 16" |
| 7 | Steve Bauer (CAN) | Toshiba–Look | + 1' 29" |
| 8 | Urs Freuler (SUI) | Atala–Ofmega | s.t. |
| 9 | Jean-François Bernard (FRA) | Toshiba–Look | + 1' 33" |
| 10 | Robert Millar (GBR) | Panasonic–Isostar | + 1' 53" |

General classification after Stage 22

| Rank | Rider | Team | Time |
|---|---|---|---|
| 1 | Stephen Roche (IRL) | Carrera Jeans–Vagabond | 105h 39' 40" |
| 2 | Robert Millar (GBR) | Panasonic–Isostar | + 3' 40" |
| 3 | Erik Breukink (NED) | Panasonic–Isostar | + 4' 17" |
| 4 | Marino Lejarreta (ESP) | Caja Rural–Orbea | + 5' 11" |
| 5 | Flavio Giupponi (ITA) | Del Tongo | + 7' 42" |
| 6 | Marco Giovannetti (ITA) | Gis Gelati–Jollyscarpe | + 11' 05" |
| 7 | Phil Anderson (AUS) | Panasonic–Isostar | + 13' 36" |
| 8 | Peter Winnen (NED) | Panasonic–Isostar | + 13' 56" |
| 9 | Johan van der Velde (NED) | Gis Gelati–Jollyscarpe | + 13' 57" |
| 10 | Steve Bauer (CAN) | Toshiba–Look | + 14' 41" |
