= 1987 Giro d'Italia, Prologue to Stage 10 =

Cycling race stages

The 1987 Giro d'Italia was the 70th edition of the Giro d'Italia, one of cycling's Grand Tours. The Giro began in San Remo, with a prologue individual time trial on 21 May, and Stage 10 occurred on 31 May with a stage to Termoli, followed by a rest day. The race finished in Saint-Vincent on 13 June.

== Prologue ==
21 May 1987 — San Remo, 4 km (2.5 mi) (ITT)

Prologue result

Rank	Rider	Team	Time
1	Roberto Visentini (ITA)	Carrera Jeans–Vagabond	4' 56"
2	Steve Bauer (CAN)	Toshiba–Look	s.t.
3	Czesław Lang (POL)	Del Tongo	+ 2"
4	Guido Bontempi (ITA)	Carrera Jeans–Vagabond	+ 3"
5	Lech Piasecki (POL)	Del Tongo	s.t.
6	Tony Rominger (SUI)	Supermercati Brianzoli–Chateau d'Ax	s.t.
7	Marco Saligari (ITA)	Ariostea–Gres	s.t.
8	Daniel Wyder (SUI)	Transvemij-Van Schilt	+ 5"
9	Stephen Roche (IRL)	Carrera Jeans–Vagabond	s.t.
10	Giuseppe Saronni (ITA)	Del Tongo	s.t.

== Stage 1a ==
22 May 1987 — San Remo to San Romolo, 31 km (19 mi)

Stage 1a result

Rank	Rider	Team	Time
1	Erik Breukink (NED)	Panasonic–Isostar	51' 09"
2	Phil Anderson (AUS)	Panasonic–Isostar	+ 16"
3	Robert Millar (GBR)	Panasonic–Isostar	+ 19"
4	Stephen Roche (IRL)	Carrera Jeans–Vagabond	s.t.
5	Peter Winnen (NED)	Panasonic–Isostar	s.t.
6	Marino Lejarreta (ESP)	Orbea	s.t.
7	Tony Rominger (SUI)	Supermercati Brianzoli–Chateau d'Ax	s.t.
8	Gianbattista Baronchelli (ITA)	Del Tongo	s.t.
9	Roberto Visentini (ITA)	Carrera Jeans–Vagabond	s.t.
10	Jiří Škoda (CSK)	Ecoflam	s.t.

General classification after Stage 1a

Rank	Rider	Team	Time
1	Erik Breukink (NED)	Panasonic–Isostar	

== Stage 1b ==
22 May 1987 — Poggio di San Remo to San Remo, 8 km (5.0 mi) (ITT)

Stage 1b result

Rank	Rider	Team	Time
1	Stephen Roche (IRL)	Carrera Jeans–Vagabond	10' 10"
2	Lech Piasecki (POL)	Del Tongo	+ 3"
3	Erik Breukink (NED)	Panasonic–Isostar	+ 6"
4	Tony Rominger (SUI)	Supermercati Brianzoli–Chateau d'Ax	+ 7"
5	Roberto Visentini (ITA)	Carrera Jeans–Vagabond	s.t.
6	Urs Freuler (SUI)	Atala–Ofmega	+ 9"
7	Phil Anderson (AUS)	Panasonic–Isostar	+ 11"
8	Guido Bontempi (ITA)	Carrera Jeans–Vagabond	+ 12"
9	Roberto Pagnin (ITA)	Gewiss–Bianchi	s.t.
10	Paul Popp (AUT)	Paini–Bottecchia–Sidi	+ 14"

General classification after Stage 1b

Rank	Rider	Team	Time
1	Erik Breukink (NED)	Panasonic–Isostar	1h 06' 22"
2	Stephen Roche (IRL)	Carrera Jeans–Vagabond	+ 14"
3	Lech Piasecki (POL)	Del Tongo	+ 21"
4	Roberto Visentini (ITA)	Carrera Jeans–Vagabond	+ 29"
5	Tony Rominger (SUI)	Supermercati Brianzoli–Chateau d'Ax	+ 30"
6	Phil Anderson (AUS)	Panasonic–Isostar	s.t.
7	Steve Bauer (CAN)	Toshiba–Look	+ 41"
8	Roberto Pagnin (ITA)	Gewiss–Bianchi	s.t.
9	Moreno Argentin (ITA)	Gewiss–Bianchi	+ 45"
10	Dag Erik Pedersen (NOR)	Ariostea–Gres	+ 49"

== Stage 2 ==
23 May 1987 — Imperia to Borgo Val di Taro, 242 km (150 mi)

Stage 2 result

Rank	Rider	Team	Time
1	Moreno Argentin (ITA)	Gewiss–Bianchi	6h 12' 35"
2	Benny Van Brabant (BEL)	Selca	s.t.
3	Luciano Boffo (ITA)	Ecoflam–BFB Bruciatori–Mareco–Alfa Lum	s.t.
4	Maurizio Fondriest (ITA)	Ecoflam	s.t.
5	Stefano Colagè (ITA)	Fibok	s.t.
6	Johan van der Velde (NED)	Gis Gelati–Jollyscarpe	s.t.
7	Paul Popp (AUT)	Paini–Bottecchia–Sidi	s.t.
8	Pierino Gavazzi (ITA)	Remac-Fanini	s.t.
9	Angelo Canzonieri (ITA)	Magniflex	s.t.
10	Giuseppe Saronni (ITA)	Del Tongo	s.t.

General classification after Stage 2

Rank	Rider	Team	Time
1	Erik Breukink (NED)	Panasonic–Isostar	7h 18' 57"
2	Stephen Roche (IRL)	Carrera Jeans–Vagabond	+ 14"
3	Lech Piasecki (POL)	Del Tongo	+ 21"
4	Moreno Argentin (ITA)	Gewiss–Bianchi	+ 26"
5	Roberto Visentini (ITA)	Carrera Jeans–Vagabond	+ 29"
6	Phil Anderson (AUS)	Panasonic–Isostar	+ 30"
7	Tony Rominger (SUI)	Supermercati Brianzoli–Chateau d'Ax	s.t.
8	Steve Bauer (CAN)	Toshiba–Look	+ 41"
9	Roberto Pagnin (ITA)	Gewiss–Bianchi	s.t.
10	Dag Erik Pedersen (NOR)	Ariostea–Gres	+ 49"

== Stage 3 ==
24 May 1987 — Lerici to Camaiore, 43 km (27 mi) (TTT)

Stage 3 result

Rank	Team	Time
1	Carrera Jeans–Vagabond	47' 22"
2	Del Tongo	+ 54"
3	Magniflex–Centroscarpa	+ 1' 04"
4	Panasonic–Isostar	+ 1' 07"
5	Atala–Ofmega	+ 1' 15"
6	Gewiss–Bianchi	+ 1' 24"
7	Toshiba–Look	+ 1' 34"
8	Supermercati Brianzoli–Chateau d'Ax	+ 1' 43"
9	Gis Gelati–Jollyscarpe	s.t.
10	Ariostea–Gres	+ 2' 04"

General classification after Stage 3

Rank	Rider	Team	Time
1	Stephen Roche (IRL)	Carrera Jeans–Vagabond	8h 06' 33"
2	Roberto Visentini (ITA)	Carrera Jeans–Vagabond	+ 15"
3	Davide Cassani (ITA)	Carrera Jeans–Vagabond	+ 52"
4	Erik Breukink (NED)	Panasonic–Isostar	+ 53"
5	Lech Piasecki (POL)	Del Tongo	+ 1' 01"
6	Bruno Leali (ITA)	Carrera Jeans–Vagabond	+ 1' 19"
7	Phil Anderson (AUS)	Panasonic–Isostar	+ 1' 23"
8	Moreno Argentin (ITA)	Gewiss–Bianchi	+ 1' 27"
9	Roberto Pagnin (ITA)	Gewiss–Bianchi	+ 1' 42"
10	Claudio Chiappucci (ITA)	Carrera Jeans–Vagabond	+ 1' 52"

== Stage 4 ==
25 May 1987 — Camaiore to Montalcino, 203 km (126 mi)

Stage 4 result

Rank	Rider	Team	Time
1	Moreno Argentin (ITA)	Gewiss–Bianchi	5h 13' 55"
2	Flavio Giupponi (ITA)	Del Tongo	+ 2"
3	Stephen Roche (IRL)	Carrera Jeans–Vagabond	+ 3"
4	Claudio Savini (ITA)	Fibok	+ 8"
5	Juan Fernández Martín (ESP)	Zahor	s.t.
6	Phil Anderson (AUS)	Panasonic–Isostar	s.t.
7	Juan Tomás Martínez (ESP)	Zahor	s.t.
8	Jiří Škoda (CSK)	Ecoflam	s.t.
9	Erik Breukink (NED)	Panasonic–Isostar	+ 10"
10	Stefano Colagè (ITA)	Fibok	s.t.

General classification after Stage 4

Rank	Rider	Team	Time
1	Stephen Roche (IRL)	Carrera Jeans–Vagabond	13h 20' 21"
2	Roberto Visentini (ITA)	Carrera Jeans–Vagabond	+ 32"
3	Davide Cassani (ITA)	Carrera Jeans–Vagabond	+ 1' 09"
4	Erik Breukink (NED)	Panasonic–Isostar	+ 1' 10"
5	Moreno Argentin (ITA)	Gewiss–Bianchi	+ 1' 14"
6	Bruno Leali (ITA)	Carrera Jeans–Vagabond	+ 1' 36"
7	Phil Anderson (AUS)	Panasonic–Isostar	+ 1' 38"
8	Lech Piasecki (POL)	Del Tongo	s.t.
9	Flavio Giupponi (ITA)	Gewiss–Bianchi	+ 2' 14"
10	Claudio Chiappucci (ITA)	Carrera Jeans–Vagabond	+ 2' 19"

== Stage 5 ==
26 May 1987 — Montalcino to Terni, 208 km (129 mi)

Stage 5 result

Rank	Rider	Team	Time
1	Eddy Planckaert (BEL)	Panasonic–Isostar	5h 05' 17"
2	Paolo Rosola (ITA)	Gewiss–Bianchi	s.t.
3	Luciano Boffo (ITA)	Ecoflam–BFB Bruciatori–Mareco–Alfa Lum	s.t.
4	Giovanni Mantovani (ITA)	Selca	s.t.
5	Adriano Baffi (ITA)	Gis Gelati–Jollyscarpe	s.t.
6	Flavio Chesini (ITA)	Magniflex	s.t.
7	Silvano Riccò (ITA)	Fibok	s.t.
8	Czesław Lang (POL)	Del Tongo	s.t.
9	Milan Jurčo (CSK)	Supermercati Brianzoli–Chateau d'Ax	s.t.
10	Benny Van Brabant (BEL)	Selca	s.t.

General classification after Stage 5

Rank	Rider	Team	Time
1	Stephen Roche (IRL)	Carrera Jeans–Vagabond	18h 35' 38"
2	Roberto Visentini (ITA)	Carrera Jeans–Vagabond	+ 32"
3	Davide Cassani (ITA)	Carrera Jeans–Vagabond	+ 1' 09"
4	Erik Breukink (NED)	Panasonic–Isostar	+ 1' 10"
5	Moreno Argentin (ITA)	Gewiss–Bianchi	+ 1' 14"
6	Lech Piasecki (POL)	Del Tongo	+ 1' 26"
7	Bruno Leali (ITA)	Carrera Jeans–Vagabond	+ 1' 36"
8	Phil Anderson (AUS)	Panasonic–Isostar	+ 1' 38"
9	Flavio Giupponi (ITA)	Gewiss–Bianchi	+ 2' 14"
10	Claudio Chiappucci (ITA)	Carrera Jeans–Vagabond	s.t.

== Stage 6 ==
27 May 1987 — Terni to Monte Terminillo, 134 km (83 mi)

Stage 6 result

Rank	Rider	Team	Time
1	Jean-Claude Bagot (FRA)	Fagor–MBK	3h 52' 16"
2	Eddy Schepers (BEL)	Carrera Jeans–Vagabond	s.t.
3	Roberto Pagnin (ITA)	Gewiss–Bianchi	+ 12"
4	Jokin Mújika (ESP)	Orbea	+ 1' 01"
5	Erik Breukink (NED)	Panasonic–Isostar	+ 1' 09"
6	Tony Rominger (SUI)	Supermercati Brianzoli–Chateau d'Ax	s.t.
7	Marino Lejarreta (ESP)	Orbea	s.t.
8	Robert Millar (GBR)	Panasonic–Isostar	s.t.
9	Stephen Roche (IRL)	Carrera Jeans–Vagabond	s.t.
10	Pedro Muñoz (ESP)	Fagor	s.t.

General classification after Stage 6

Rank	Rider	Team	Time
1	Stephen Roche (IRL)	Carrera Jeans–Vagabond	22h 29' 03"
2	Roberto Visentini (ITA)	Carrera Jeans–Vagabond	+ 32"
3	Erik Breukink (NED)	Panasonic–Isostar	+ 1' 10"
4	Roberto Pagnin (ITA)	Gewiss–Bianchi	+ 1' 22"
5	Flavio Giupponi (ITA)	Gewiss–Bianchi	+ 2' 14"
6	Davide Cassani (ITA)	Carrera Jeans–Vagabond	+ 2' 17"
7	Robert Millar (GBR)	Panasonic–Isostar	+ 2' 18"
8	Tony Rominger (SUI)	Supermercati Brianzoli–Chateau d'Ax	+ 2' 21"
9	Phil Anderson (AUS)	Panasonic–Isostar	+ 2' 30"
10	Eddy Schepers (BEL)	Carrera Jeans–Vagabond	+ 2' 33"

== Stage 7 ==
28 May 1987 — Rieti to Roccaraso, 205 km (127 mi)

Stage 7 result

Rank	Rider	Team	Time
1	Moreno Argentin (ITA)	Gewiss–Bianchi	5h 28' 22"
2	Franco Chioccioli (ITA)	Gis Gelati–Jollyscarpe	s.t.
3	Johan van der Velde (NED)	Gis Gelati–Jollyscarpe	+ 4"
4	Giuseppe Saronni (ITA)	Del Tongo	s.t.
5	Roberto Pagnin (ITA)	Gewiss–Bianchi	s.t.
6	Benny Van Brabant (BEL)	Selca	s.t.
7	Phil Anderson (AUS)	Panasonic–Isostar	s.t.
8	Stefano Colagè (ITA)	Fibok	s.t.
9	Jiří Škoda (CSK)	Ecoflam	s.t.
10	Marco Vitali (ITA)	Atala–Ofmega	s.t.

General classification after Stage 7

Rank	Rider	Team	Time
1	Stephen Roche (IRL)	Carrera Jeans–Vagabond	27h 57' 29"
2	Roberto Visentini (ITA)	Carrera Jeans–Vagabond	+ 32"
3	Erik Breukink (NED)	Panasonic–Isostar	+ 1' 10"
4	Roberto Pagnin (ITA)	Gewiss–Bianchi	+ 1' 22"
5	Flavio Giupponi (ITA)	Gewiss–Bianchi	+ 2' 14"
6	Davide Cassani (ITA)	Carrera Jeans–Vagabond	+ 2' 17"
7	Robert Millar (GBR)	Panasonic–Isostar	+ 2' 18"
8	Tony Rominger (SUI)	Supermercati Brianzoli–Chateau d'Ax	+ 2' 21"
9	Phil Anderson (AUS)	Panasonic–Isostar	+ 2' 30"
10	Eddy Schepers (BEL)	Carrera Jeans–Vagabond	+ 2' 35"

== Stage 8 ==
29 May 1987 — Roccaraso to San Giorgio del Sannio, 168 km (104 mi)

Stage 8 result

Rank	Rider	Team	Time
1	Paolo Rosola (ITA)	Gewiss–Bianchi	3h 45' 40"
2	Guido Bontempi (ITA)	Carrera Jeans–Vagabond	s.t.
3	Stefano Allocchio (ITA)	Supermercati Brianzoli–Chateau d'Ax	s.t.
4	Adriano Baffi (ITA)	Gis Gelati–Jollyscarpe	s.t.
5	Luciano Boffo (ITA)	Ecoflam–BFB Bruciatori–Mareco–Alfa Lum	s.t.
6	Stefano Colagè (ITA)	Fibok	s.t.
7	Franco Chioccioli (ITA)	Gis Gelati–Jollyscarpe	s.t.
8	Johan van der Velde (NED)	Gis Gelati–Jollyscarpe	s.t.
9	Paul Popp (AUT)	Paini–Bottecchia–Sidi	s.t.
10	Benny Van Brabant (BEL)	Selca	s.t.

General classification after Stage 8

Rank	Rider	Team	Time
1	Stephen Roche (IRL)	Carrera Jeans–Vagabond	31h 43' 09"
2	Roberto Visentini (ITA)	Carrera Jeans–Vagabond	+ 32"
3	Erik Breukink (NED)	Panasonic–Isostar	+ 1' 10"
4	Roberto Pagnin (ITA)	Gewiss–Bianchi	+ 1' 22"
5	Flavio Giupponi (ITA)	Gewiss–Bianchi	+ 2' 14"
6	Davide Cassani (ITA)	Carrera Jeans–Vagabond	+ 2' 17"
7	Robert Millar (GBR)	Panasonic–Isostar	+ 2' 18"
8	Tony Rominger (SUI)	Supermercati Brianzoli–Chateau d'Ax	+ 2' 21"
9	Phil Anderson (AUS)	Panasonic–Isostar	+ 2' 30"
10	Eddy Schepers (BEL)	Carrera Jeans–Vagabond	+ 2' 35"

== Stage 9 ==
30 May 1987 — San Giorgio del Sannio to Bari, 257 km (160 mi)

Stage 9 result

Rank	Rider	Team	Time
1	Urs Freuler (SUI)	Atala–Ofmega	7h 09' 40"
2	Paolo Rosola (ITA)	Gewiss–Bianchi	s.t.
3	Johan van der Velde (NED)	Gis Gelati–Jollyscarpe	s.t.
4	Mathieu Hermans (NED)	Orbea	s.t.
5	Guido Bontempi (ITA)	Carrera Jeans–Vagabond	s.t.
6	Alessio Di Basco (ITA)	Remac-Fanini	s.t.
7	Stefano Colagè (ITA)	Fibok	s.t.
8	Eddy Planckaert (BEL)	Panasonic–Isostar	s.t.
9	Flavio Chesini (ITA)	Magniflex	s.t.
10	Stefano Allocchio (ITA)	Supermercati Brianzoli–Chateau d'Ax	s.t.

General classification after Stage 9

Rank	Rider	Team	Time
1	Stephen Roche (IRL)	Carrera Jeans–Vagabond	38h 52' 49"
2	Roberto Visentini (ITA)	Carrera Jeans–Vagabond	+ 32"
3	Erik Breukink (NED)	Panasonic–Isostar	+ 1' 10"
4	Roberto Pagnin (ITA)	Gewiss–Bianchi	+ 1' 22"
5	Flavio Giupponi (ITA)	Gewiss–Bianchi	+ 2' 14"
6	Davide Cassani (ITA)	Carrera Jeans–Vagabond	+ 2' 17"
7	Robert Millar (GBR)	Panasonic–Isostar	+ 2' 18"
8	Tony Rominger (SUI)	Supermercati Brianzoli–Chateau d'Ax	+ 2' 21"
9	Phil Anderson (AUS)	Panasonic–Isostar	+ 2' 30"
10	Eddy Schepers (BEL)	Carrera Jeans–Vagabond	+ 2' 35"

== Stage 10 ==
31 May 1987 — Bari to Termoli, 210 km (130 mi)

Stage 10 result

Rank	Rider	Team	Time
1	Paolo Rosola (ITA)	Gewiss–Bianchi	5h 37' 08"
2	Urs Freuler (SUI)	Atala–Ofmega	s.t.
3	Luciano Boffo (ITA)	Ecoflam–BFB Bruciatori–Mareco–Alfa Lum	s.t.
4	Pierino Gavazzi (ITA)	Remac-Fanini	s.t.
5	Johan Capiot (BEL)	Roland	s.t.
6	Palmiro Masciarelli (ITA)	Gis Gelati–Jollyscarpe	s.t.
7	Johan van der Velde (NED)	Gis Gelati–Jollyscarpe	s.t.
8	Dietrich Thurau (FRG)	Roland	s.t.
9	Milan Jurčo (CSK)	Supermercati Brianzoli–Chateau d'Ax	s.t.
10	Alessio Di Basco (ITA)	Remac-Fanini	s.t.

General classification after Stage 10

Rank	Rider	Team	Time
1	Stephen Roche (IRL)	Carrera Jeans–Vagabond	44h 29' 57"
2	Roberto Visentini (ITA)	Carrera Jeans–Vagabond	+ 32"
3	Erik Breukink (NED)	Panasonic–Isostar	+ 1' 10"
4	Roberto Pagnin (ITA)	Gewiss–Bianchi	+ 1' 22"
5	Flavio Giupponi (ITA)	Gewiss–Bianchi	+ 2' 14"
6	Davide Cassani (ITA)	Carrera Jeans–Vagabond	+ 2' 17"
7	Robert Millar (GBR)	Panasonic–Isostar	+ 2' 18"
8	Tony Rominger (SUI)	Supermercati Brianzoli–Chateau d'Ax	+ 2' 21"
9	Phil Anderson (AUS)	Panasonic–Isostar	+ 2' 30"
10	Eddy Schepers (BEL)	Carrera Jeans–Vagabond	+ 2' 35"

== Rest day ==
31 May 1987
