= Young rider classification in the Giro d'Italia =

Cycle race classification

White Jersey
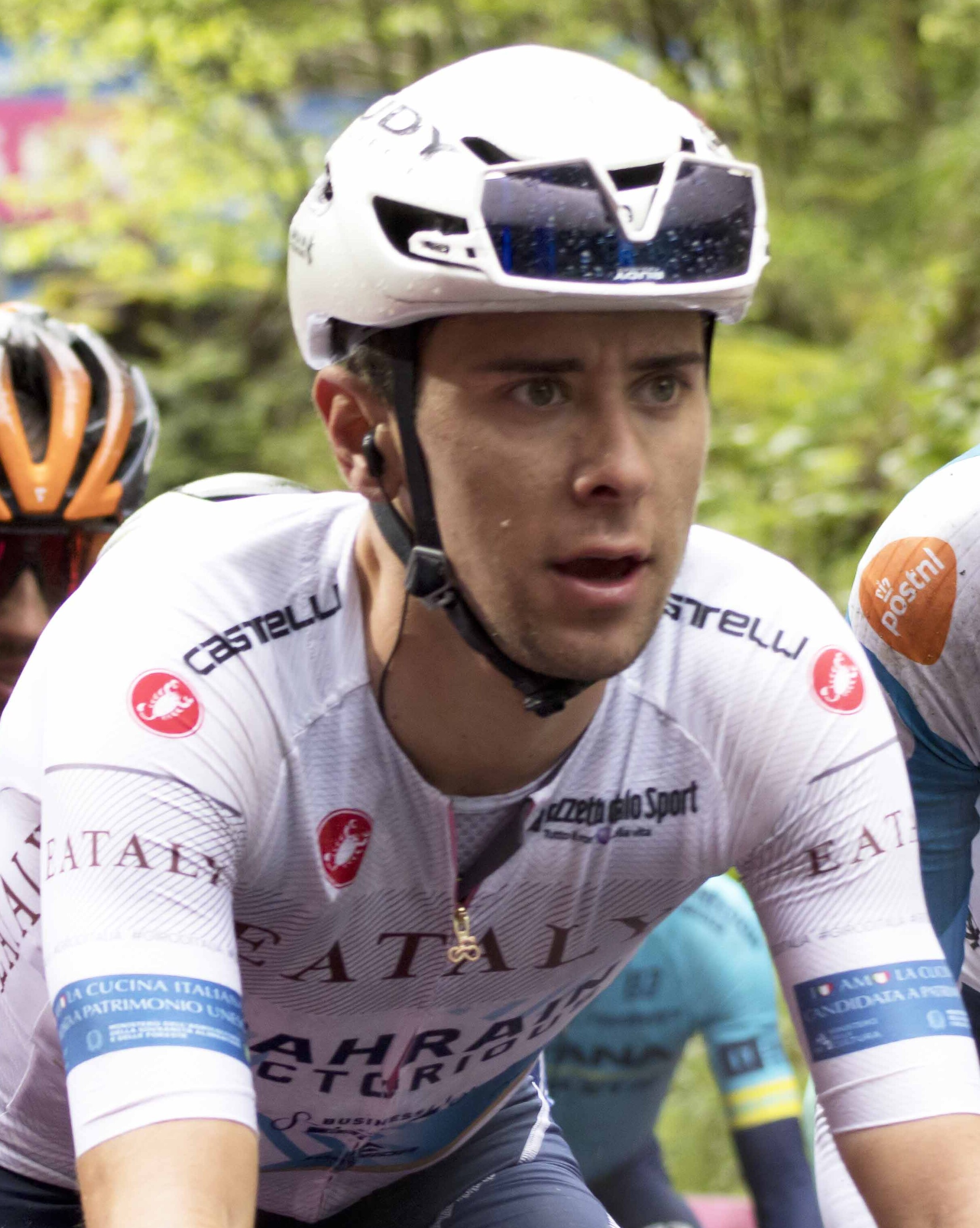
- Antonio Tiberi in the white jersey at the 2024 Giro d'Italia.
- Sport: Road bicycle racing
- Competition: Giro d'Italia
- Awarded for: Best young rider
- Local name: Maglia bianca (in Italian)

History
- First award: 1976
- Editions: 37 (as of 2024)
- First winner: Alfio Vandi (ITA)
- Most wins: Vladimir Poulnikov (URS); Pavel Tonkov (RUS); Bob Jungels (LUX); Miguel Ángel López (COL) (2 wins)
- Most recent: Afonso Eulálio (POR)

The Young rider classification in the Giro d'Italia was added to the Giro d'Italia in 1976 for the younger riders in the race. The classification is calculated in the same way as the general classification, with the riders times being totaled together after each stage; however, the classification is restricted to those no older than 25 years during the calendar year of the race. Between 1976 and 1994 the classification had different qualifications. The leader of the classification is awarded a white jersey (maglia bianca).

The classification was discontinued after the 1994 Giro d'Italia. However, it was reintroduced in 2007, with the age limit increased to 25 years.

== Winners ==
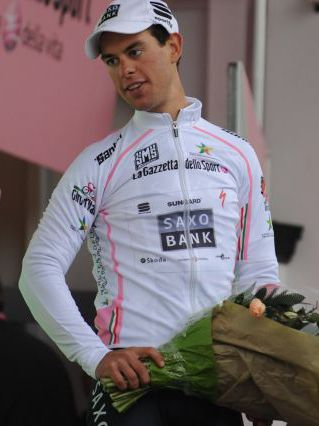
Richie Porte wearing the white jersey in 2010

Key
#	Winner won general classification in the same year

- The "Year" column refers to the year the competition was held, and wikilinks to the article about that season.
- The "Distance" column refers to the distance over which the race was held.
- The "Margin" column refers to the margin of time or points by which the winner defeated the runner-up.
- The "Stage wins" column refers to the number of stage wins the winner had during the race.

Giro d'Italia young rider classification winners
Year	Country	Cyclist	Sponsor/team	Distance	Time	Position Overall	Stage wins
1976	Italy	Alfio Vandi	Magniflex	4,161 km (2,586 mi)	120h 02' 22"	7th	0
1977	Italy	Mario Beccia	Sanson	3,884 km (2,413 mi)	107h 41' 04"	9th	1
1978	Italy	Roberto Visentini	Vibor	3,610 km (2,240 mi)	101h 50' 07"	15th	1
1979	Italy	Silvano Contini	Bianchi–Faema	3,301 km (2,051 mi)	89h 36' 51"	5th	0
1980	Sweden	Tommy Prim	Bianchi–Piaggio	4,025 km (2,501 mi)	112h 16' 13"	4th	1
1981	Italy	Giuseppe Faraca	Hoonved–Bottecchia	3,895 km (2,420 mi)	105h 05' 30"	5th	0
1982	Italy	Marco Groppo	Metauro Mobili	4,010 km (2,490 mi)	110h 22' 38"	9th	0
1983	Italy	Franco Chioccioli	Vivi–Benotto	3,916 km (2,433 mi)	101h 00' 52"	16th	0
1984	France	Charly Mottet	Renault–Elf	3,808 km (2,366 mi)	99h 02' 11"	21st	0
1985	Italy	Alberto Volpi	Sammontana–Bianchi	3,998 km (2,484 mi)	105h 57' 22"	10th	0
1986	Italy	Marco Giovannetti	Gis Gelati–Oece	3,858 km (2,397 mi)	102h 41' 58"	8th	1
1987	Italy	Roberto Conti	Selca–Conti	3,915 km (2,433 mi)	106h 00' 33"	15th	0
1988	Italy	Stefano Tomasini	Fanini–Seven Up	3,623 km (2,251 mi)	97h 45' 57"	9th	0
1989	Soviet Union	Vladimir Poulnikov	Alfa Lum	3,623 km (2,251 mi)	93h 40' 06"	11th	0
1990	Soviet Union	Vladimir Poulnikov	Alfa Lum–BFB Bruciatori	3,450 km (2,140 mi)	92h 03' 07"	4th	1
1991	Italy	Massimiliano Lelli	Ari-Ceramiche Ariostea	3,715 km (2,308 mi)	99h 42' 39"	3rd	2
1992	Russia	Pavel Tonkov	Lampre–Colnago	3,835 km (2,383 mi)	103h 53' 23"	7th	0
1993	Russia	Pavel Tonkov	Lampre–Polti	3,703 km (2,301 mi)	98h 16' 55"	5th	0
1994	Russia	Evgeni Berzin^{#}	Gewiss–Ballan	3,738 km (2,323 mi)	100h 41' 21"	1st	3
1995–2006 No white jersey competition
2007	Luxembourg	Andy Schleck	Team CSC	3,463 km (2,152 mi)	93h 01' 34"	2nd	2
2008	Italy	Riccardo Riccò	Saunier Duval–Scott	3,420 km (2,130 mi)	89h 58' 46"	2nd	2
2009	Belgium	Kevin Seeldraeyers	Quick-Step	3,456 km (2,147 mi)	86h 19' 26"	10th	0
2010	Australia	Richie Porte	Team Saxo Bank	3,485 km (2,165 mi)	87h 51' 23"	7th	1
2011	Czech Republic	Roman Kreuziger	Astana	3,524 km (2,190 mi)	84h 16' 42"	6th	0
2012	Colombia	Rigoberto Urán	Team Sky	3,503 km (2,177 mi)	91h 44' 59"	7th	0
2013	Colombia	Carlos Betancur	Ag2r–La Mondiale	3,405 km (2,116 mi)	84h 00' 56"	5th	0
2014	Colombia	Nairo Quintana^{#}	Movistar Team	3,445.5 km (2,140.9 mi)	88h 14' 32"	1st	2
2015	Italy	Fabio Aru	Astana	3,481.8 km (2,163.5 mi)	88h 24' 18"	2nd	2
2016	Luxembourg	Bob Jungels	Etixx–Quick-Step	3,463.15 km (2,151.90 mi)	82h 53' 02"	6th	0
2017	Luxembourg	Bob Jungels	Quick-Step Floors	3,609.1 km (2,242.6 mi)	90h 41' 58"	8th	1
2018	Colombia	Miguel Ángel López	Astana	3,572.4 km (2,219.8 mi)	89h 07' 36"	3rd	0
2019	Colombia	Miguel Ángel López	Astana	3,546.8 km (2,203.9 mi)	90h 09' 13"	7th	0
2020	United Kingdom	Tao Geoghegan Hart^{#}	INEOS Grenadiers	3,361.4 km (2,088.7 mi)	85h 40' 21"	1st	2
2021	Colombia	Egan Bernal^{#}	INEOS Grenadiers	3,410.9 km (2,119.4 mi)	86h 17' 28"	1st	2
2022	Spain	Juan Pedro López	Trek–Segafredo	3,449.6 km (2,143.5 mi)	86h 49' 54"	10th	0
2023	Portugal	João Almeida	UAE Team Emirates	3,448.0 km (2,142.5 mi)	85h 30' 17"	3rd	1
2024	Italy	Antonio Tiberi	Team Bahrain Victorious	3,317.5 km (2,061.4 mi)	79h 26' 52"	5th	0
2025	Mexico	Isaac del Toro	UAE Team Emirates XRG	3,443.3 km (2,139.6 mi)	82h 34' 57"	2nd	1
