= Vladimir Poulnikov =

Ukrainian cyclist

Volodymyr Poulnikov
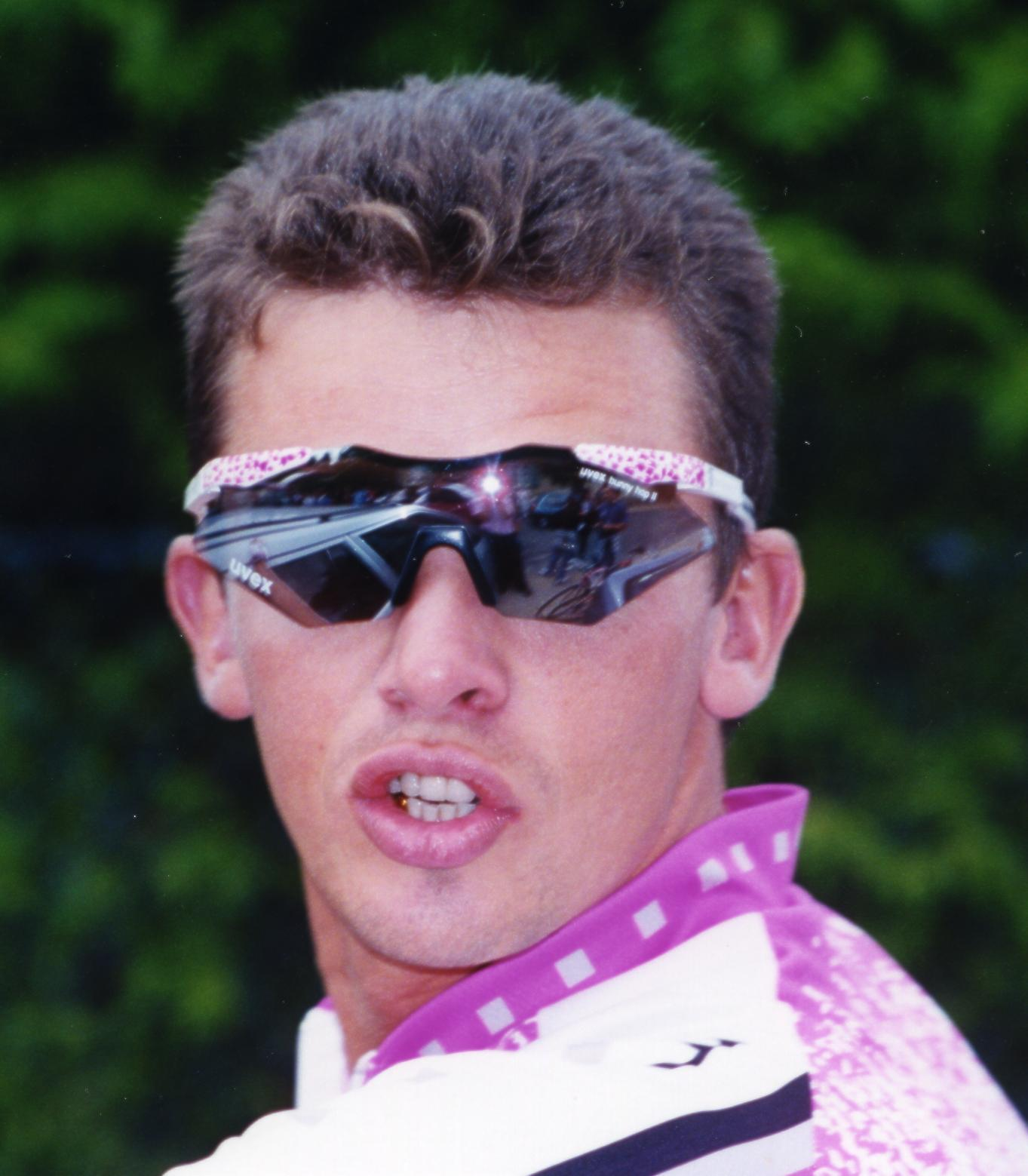

Personal information
- Full name: Volodymyr Poulnikov
- Born: 6 June 1965 (age 61) Pyshma, Sverdlovsk Oblast, RSFSR, Soviet Union

Cycling career
- Sport: Cycling
- Current team: Retired
- Discipline: Road
- Role: Rider

Amateur team
- -: USSR Amateur team

Professional teams
- 1989–1990: Alfa Lum–STM
- 1991–1994: Carrera Jeans–Tassoni
- 1995: Team Telekom
- 1996: TVM–Farm Frites
- 1997–1998: Kross–Montanari–Selle Italia

Major wins
- Grand Tours Giro d'Italia Young rider classification (1989, 1990) 3 individual stages (1990, 1991, 1994)

Volodymyr Pulnikov (Ukrainian: Володимир Пульніков; born 6 June 1965 in Pyshma, Sverdlovsk Oblast, RSFSR, Soviet Union) is a Ukrainian former road racing cyclist.

== Career ==
He debuted in the amateur categories for Soviet Union. As a professional, his best results include a 4th place overall in the 1990 Giro d'Italia, a 10th overall place at the Tour de France in 1993 and 1994, and a second place overall at the 1994 Tour de Suisse and the stage victory in the Giro. He also competed in the men's individual road race at the 1996 Summer Olympics.

Poulnikov retired from professional cycling in 1998.

== Major results ==
1985
1st Stage 6 GP Tell
1986
2nd Overall Course de la Paix
1987
3rd Overall Okolo Slovenska
1988
2nd Overall Course de la Paix
2nd Overall Giro Ciclistico d'Italia
1989
Giro d'Italia

1st Young rider classification
1st Stage 9

1st Overall Cronostaffetta (TTT)
3rd Memorial Gastone Nencini
1990
2nd Overall Tour of Belgium
4th Overall Giro d'Italia

1st Young rider classification

1991
7th Tre Valli Varesine
1992
1st Overall Cronostaffetta (TTT)
1st Road race, National Road Championships
1st Stage 4 Vuelta Ciclista al Pais Vasco
1st Stage 5 Clásico RCN
3rd Giro del Lazio
1993
7th Overall Giro d'Italia
9th Overall Vuelta Ciclista al Pais Vasco
10th Overall Giro del Trentino
10th Overall Tour de France
10th Subida a Urkiola
1994
1st Giro del Friuli
1st Stage 20 Giro d'Italia
2nd Overall Tour de Suisse
10th Overall Tour de France
1996
4th Overall Route du Sud
1997
3rd Giro di Toscana

=== Grand Tour general classification results timeline ===
Grand Tour	1989	1990	1991	1992	1993	1994	1995	1996	1997
Vuelta a España	31	DNF	66	44	—	—	—	—	—
Giro d'Italia	11	4	11	—	7	11	14	16	DNF
Tour de France	—	—	88	—	10	10	25	DNF	—

Legend
—	Did not compete
DNF	Did not finish
