= Pepsi-Cola (cycling team, 1987–1989) =

Cycling team (1987-1989)

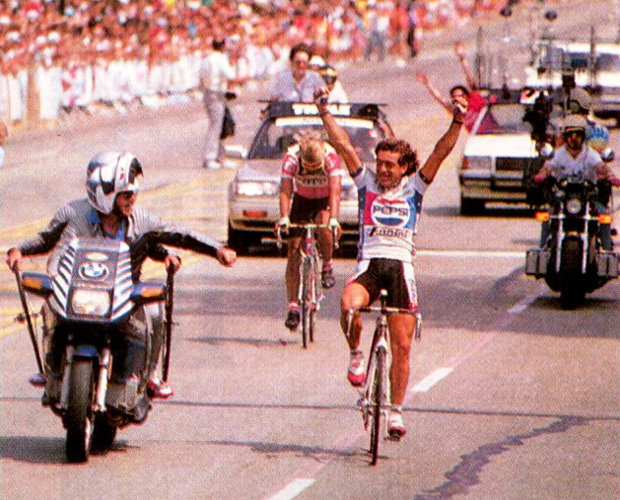
- Pepsi-Cola team member Roberto Gaggiolo winning the CoreStates Championship in Philadelphia

Team information
- Registered: United States (1987); Italy (1988–1989)
- Founded: 1987
- Disbanded: 1989
- Discipline: Road

Key personnel
- Team managers: Simone Fraccaro; Giuseppe Lanzoni; Donato Giuliani

Team name history
- 1987 1988 1989: Pepsi-Cola–Alba Cucine; Pepsi-Cola–Fanini–FNT; Pepsi-Cola–Alba Cucine

Pepsi-Cola was an Italian and American professional cycling team that existed from 1987 to 1989.

The team competed in the 1989 Giro d'Italia.

== Major wins ==
1988
Philadelphia International Championship, Roberto Gaggioli
1989
Giro del Trentino, Mauro-Antonio Santaromita
