= Roberto Conti (cyclist) =

Italian cyclist

Personal information
- Full name: Roberto Conti
- Born: 16 December 1964 (age 61) Faenza, Italy
- Height: 1.80 m (5 ft 11 in)
- Weight: 70 kg (154 lb; 11 st 0 lb)

Cycling career
- Sport: Cycling
- Current team: Retired
- Discipline: Road
- Role: Rider
- Rider type: Climber

Professional teams
- 1986–1989: Santini
- 1990–1993: Ariostea
- 1994–1996: Lampre–Panaria
- 1997–1999: Mercatone Uno
- 2000: Vini Caldirola–Sidermec
- 2001–2002: Cantina Tollo–Acqua & Sapone
- 2003: Mercatone Uno–Scanavino

Major wins
- Stage 16, 1994 Tour de France

Roberto Conti (born 16 December 1964) is an Italian former road cyclist, whose biggest win came in the 1994 Tour de France as he won the Alpe d'Huez stage after an impressive break-away. His professional career ended in 2003.

Conti also won the Young rider classification in the Giro d'Italia in 1987.

== Career achievements ==
=== Major results ===
1985
5th GP Capodarco
1987
1st Young rider classification Giro d'Italia
1988
8th Giro di Toscana
1989
8th Giro di Toscana
1990
3rd Trofeo dello Scalatore
10th Coppa Placci
1991
1st Stage 2 (TTT) Tour de France
1992
2nd Overall Giro del Trentino
7th Giro di Toscana
9th Overall Giro d'Italia
10th Gran Premio Città di Camaiore
1993
5th Giro di Toscana
6th Giro del Friuli
1994
3rd Overall Grand Prix du Midi Libre
6th Overall Tour de France

1st Stage 16

8th Gran Premio Città di Camaiore
1997
4th Subida a Urkiola
5th Gran Premio Città di Camaiore
10th Overall Tour de France
1999
1st Giro della Romagna
6th Giro del Piemonte
8th Trofeo dello Scalatore
8th Firenze–Pistoia
9th Gran Premio Bruno Beghelli

=== Grand Tour general classification results timeline ===
Grand Tour	1987	1988	1989	1990	1991	1992	1993	1994	1995	1996	1997	1998	1999	2000	2001	2002	2003
Giro d'Italia	15	33	12	29	42	9	DNF	19	89	DNF	18	29	—	44	55	79	56
Tour de France	—	—	—	18	29	84	14	6	DNF	DNF	10	60	DNF	16	—	—	—
Vuelta a España	—	—	—	—	—	—	—	—	—	—	—	—	—	—	23	—	—
