= Paolo Cimini =

Italian cyclist

Personal information
- Full name: Paolo Cimini
- Born: 30 March 1964 (age 62) Rome, Italy

Cycling career
- Sport: Cycling
- Discipline: Road

Professional teams
- 1986: Murella
- 1987: Remac
- 1988: Fanini
- 1989: Jolly Componibili
- 1990: Gis Gelati

Major wins
- Grand Tours Giro d'Italia 1 Stage (1987)

Paolo Cimini (born 30 March 1964) was a former Italian professional cyclist. He is most known for winning one stage in the 1987 Giro d'Italia.
