= John Carlsen =

Danish cyclist

Personal information
- Born: 31 December 1961 (age 64) Hovedstaden, Denmark

Cycling career
- Sport: Cycling
- Discipline: Road
- Role: Rider

Professional teams
- 1988–1989: Fagor–MBK
- 1990: Toshiba
- 1991: Tonton Tapis–GB

John Carlsen (born 31 December 1961) is a Danish former racing cyclist. He rode in six Grand Tours between 1988 and 1991. He won Stage 8 of the 1989 Giro d'Italia which was a high mountain stage including a climb of the Gran Sasso d'Italia. He also competed in the team time trial event at the 1984 Summer Olympics.

== Career achievements ==
=== Major results ===
1982
1st Stage 4 Tour of Sweden
1986
2nd National Road Race Championships
1988
5th Grand Prix d'Isbergues
8th Overall Volta a Portugal

1st Stage 1

1989
1st Stage 8 Giro d'Italia
7th Overall Tour du Limousin
1990
9th Overall Vuelta a Andalucía
9th Overall Route du Sud
1991
9th Druivenkoers Overijse

=== Grand Tour general classification results timeline ===
| Grand Tour | 1988 | 1989 | 1990 | 1991 |
|---|---|---|---|---|
| Giro d'Italia | — | 40 | — | — |
| Tour de France | — | 53 | DNF | DNF |
| Vuelta a España | 105 | — | DNF | — |
