= 1989 Giro d'Italia =

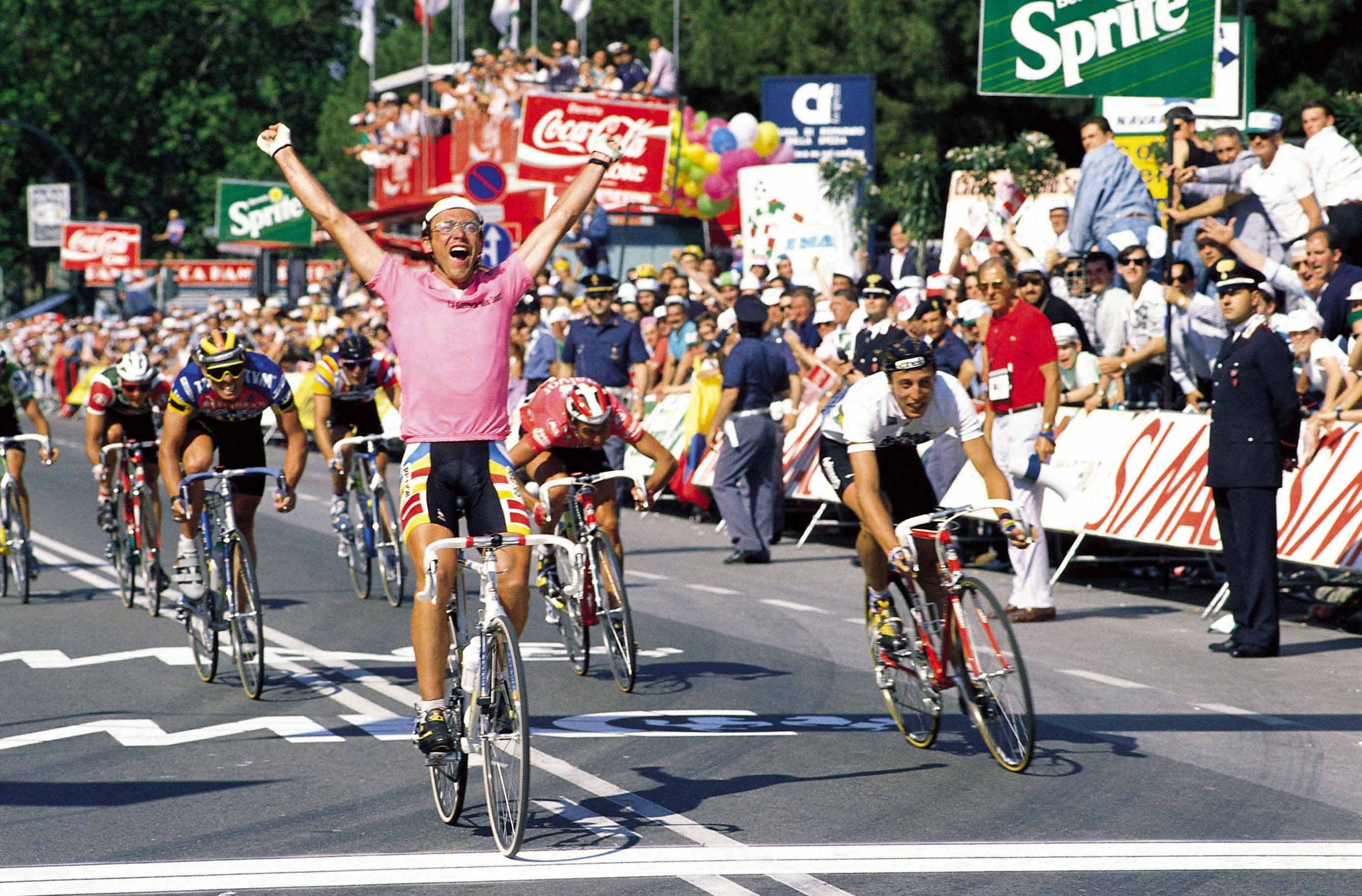
- Overall winner Laurent Fignon taking victory on stage 20

Race details
- Dates: 21 May – 11 June 1989
- Stages: 22, including one split stage
- Distance: 3,418 km (2,124 mi)
- Winning time: 93h 30' 16"

Results
Jersey awarded to the overall winner	Winner	Laurent Fignon (FRA)	(Système U)
	Second	Flavio Giupponi (ITA)	(Malvor-Sidi)
	Third	Andrew Hampsten (USA)	(7-Eleven)
Jersey awarded to the points classification winner	Points	Giovanni Fidanza (ITA)	(Chateau d'Ax-Salotti)
Jersey awarded to the mountains classification winner	Mountains	Luis Herrera (COL)	(Café de Colombia-Mavic)
Jersey awarded to the youth classification winner	Youth	Vladimir Poulnikov (URS)	(Alfa Lum-STM)
	Sprints	Luigi Bielli (ITA)	(Del Tongo)
Jersey awarded to the intergiro classification winner	Intergiro	Jure Pavlič (YUG)	(Carrera Jeans–Vagabond)
	Team	Fagor - MBK	

The 1989 Giro d'Italia was the 72nd edition of the race. It started off in Taormina on 21 May with a 123 km (76.4 mi) flat stage that ended in Catania. The race concluded in Florence with a 53 km (32.9 mi) individual time trial on 11 June. Twenty-two teams entered the race, which was won by the Frenchman Laurent Fignon of the Super U team. Second and third respectively were the Italian Flavio Giupponi and the American rider, Andrew Hampsten.

In the race's other classifications, Vladimir Poulnikov of the Alfa Lum-STM finished the Giro as the best neo-professional in the general classification, finishing in eleventh place overall; Café de Colombia rider Luis Herrera won the mountains classification, Giovanni Fidanza of the Chateau d'Ax-Salotti team won the points classification, and Carrera Jeans–Vagabond rider Jure Pavlič won the inaugural intergiro classification. Fagor - MBK finished as the winners of the Trofeo Fast Team classification, ranking each of the twenty-two teams contesting the race by lowest cumulative time.

== Teams ==
Twenty-two teams were invited by the race organizers to participate in the 1989 edition of the Giro d'Italia, ten of which were based outside of Italy. The starting riders came from a total of 22 different countries; Italy (82), Belgium (15), the Netherlands (15), Switzerland (15), France (13), and Spain (13) all had more than 10 riders. The peloton featured for the first time Soviet riders as a ban on cyclists becoming professional. These Soviet cyclists competed for Alfa Lum–STM, composing the whole team. Each team sent a squad of nine riders, which meant that the race started with a peloton of 198 cyclists.

Of those starting, 75 were riding the Giro d'Italia for the first time. The average age of riders was 26.94 years, ranging from 21–year–old Massimiliano Lelli (Atala–Campagnolo) to 35–year–old Henk Lubberding (Panasonic–Isostar–Colnago–Agu). The team with the youngest average rider age was Atala–Campagnolo (24), while the oldest was Hitachi–Zonca (29). From those that started, 141 of them reached the finish line in Florence.

The teams entering the race were:

- 7-Eleven
- AD Renting–W-Cup–Bottecchia
- Alfa Lum–STM
- Ariostea
- Atala–Campagnolo
- Café de Colombia
- Caja Rural
- Carrera Jeans–Vagabond
- Chateau d'Ax
- Del Tongo
- Fagor–MBK
- Frank–Toyo–Magniflex
- Gewiss–Bianchi
- Hitachi–Zonca
- Jolly Componibili–Club 88
- Malvor
- Panasonic–Isostar–Colnago–Agu
- Pepsi Cola–Alba Cucine
- Selca
- Seur
- Super U–Raleigh–Fiat
- TVM–Ragno

== Pre-race favorites ==
Many expected the winner of the race to be a foreign, non-Italian rider. Several riders were seen as contenders for the overall crown. La Liberté named the following contenders: Hampsten, Greg LeMond, Luis Herrera, Erik Breukink, Laurent Fignon, Phil Anderson, Urs Zimmermann, and Claude Criquielion. De Telegraaf listed the three favorites to be Breukink, Hampsten, and Roche. Former winner Stephen Roche returned to the Giro following a year absence and recently visited a doctor in Munich to treat one of his knees. Roche was anticipated to receive a poor welcome due to how he won the Giro in 1987 by taking the lead from Italian and teammate Roberto Visentini. Reigning champion Hampsten entered the Giro after showing good forming in the early calendar races. Hampsten himself stated he felt good entering the race and stated the route did not offer many opportunities to recover. In addition, Hampsten had been specifically training for the individual time trial in his home in Boulder, Colorado in the weeks preceding the race's start. When asked about the inclusion of the Passo di Gavia – which was crossed the previous year in blizzard conditions on a day where Hampsten secured the race lead – Hampsten hoped to "... cross that mountain when the sun shines." Breukink was seen as the best hope for a Dutch rider to win the Giro due to third and second-place finishes in 1987 and 1988, respectively. Fignon and Zimmmermann were seen as strong contenders to compete for the victory following their joint attack on the Col de la Croix in the Tour de Romandie. Fignon, a two-time winner of the Tour de France, entered the Giro for the first time since his controversial loss to Francesco Moser in 1984. In the years after his first Tour victory in 1984, Fignon's seasons were plagued by poor performances due to a variety of injuries. He had returned to form starting in 1988 with a win in Milan–San Remo, which he repeated as champion in 1989. Fignon's teammates were regarded as a weak point for his title hopes as they were felt to be weaker than his previous teams in the early 1980s.

Urs Freuler was seen as a rider to contend for his fourteenth Giro stage win, while Dutch sprinter Jean-Paul van Poppel was seen as a prominent challenger for Freuler in the sprint stages. Zimmermann was seen as a candidate to win if he could limit his losses in the time trials. Herrera, Criquielion, and Maurizio Fondriest all rode their first Giro. Limburgsch dagblad felt the race attracted most top tier riders to participate except for Pedro Delgado, Charly Mottet, and Steven Rooks, among others. Luis Gómez of El País felt the main novelty of the race was the presence of the Alfa Lum team rostered with Soviet riders, including the likes of 23-year old Dimitri Konyshev whom they hoped would finish high overall. He also felt LeMond's form was poor. Herrera came to the Giro hoping for success as the stages were shorter than the Tour's and the general pace of the Giro is slower than the Tour. Lejaretta hoped to challenge for stage wins in the mountains due to the toughness climbs. Fondriest was seen as the main Italian hope as he was an all-rounder who was only 24-years of age.

== Route and stages ==
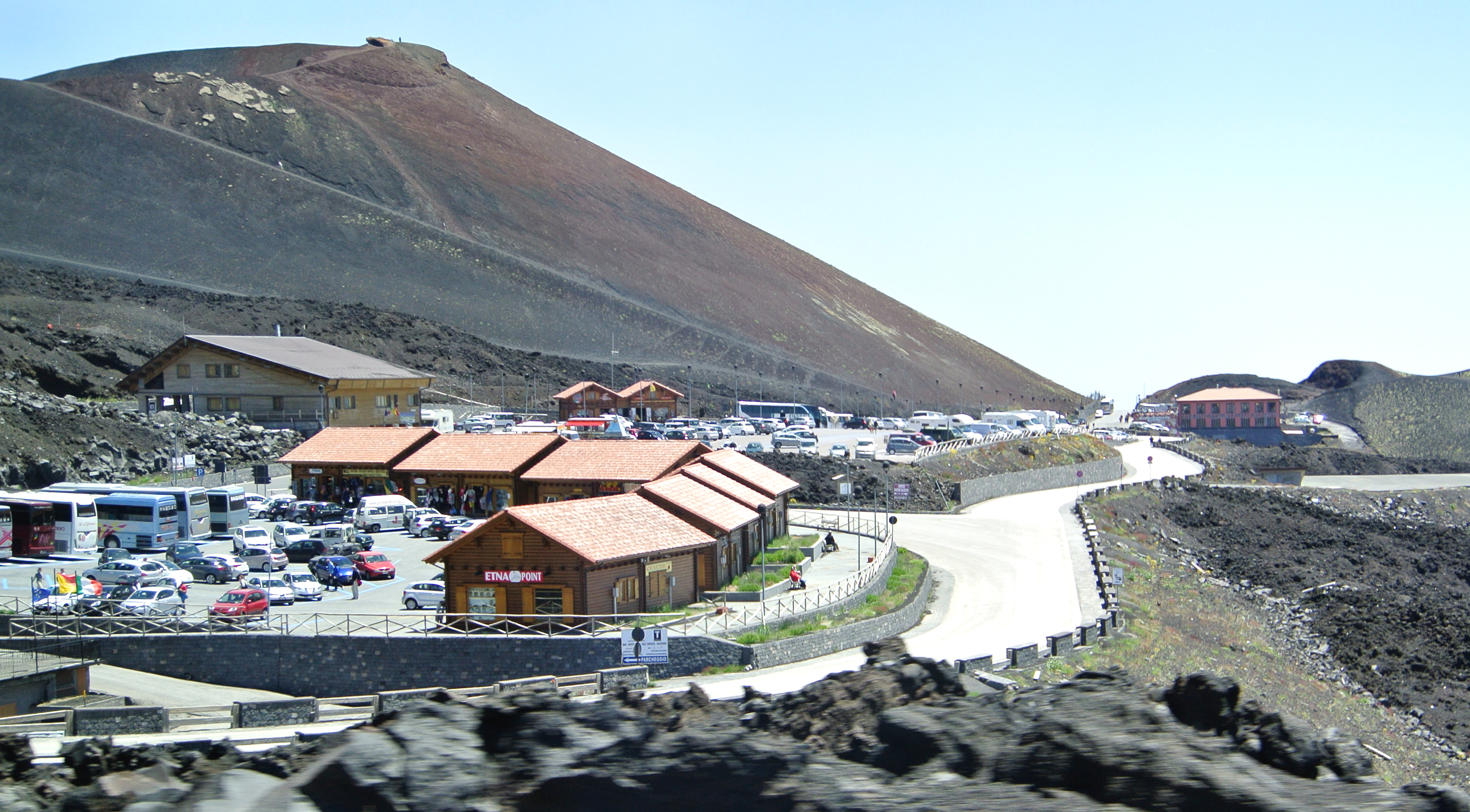
Mount Etna hosted the end of the 132 km (82 mi) second stage that began in the nearby city of Catania.

The route for the 1989 edition of the Giro d'Italia was revealed to the public on television by head organizer Vincenzo Torriani, on 21 January 1989. It contained four time trial events, three of which were individual and one a team event. There were fourteen stages containing thirty-five categorized climbs, of which three had summit finishes: stage 2, to Mount Etna; stage 8, to Gran Sasso d'Italia; and stage 13, to Tre Cime di Lavaredo. Another stage with a mountain-top finish was stage 18, which consisted of a climbing time trial to Monte Generoso. The organizers chose to not include any rest days. When compared to the previous year's race, the race was 161 km (100 mi) shorter, contained the number of rest days and time trials, and had one more stage. In addition, this race contained one less set of half stages. After the route had been announced in January, former winner Francesco Moser – who joined the race organizing staff – received criticism as the route was thought to be very difficult and "heavy." This criticism was due to Moser's history of complaining routes were too difficult in the past, when many viewed them not as such.

The sixteenth day of racing was thought to be the queen stage of the race as it featured several categorized climbs, including the Cima Coppi, the Passo di Gavia. Due to harsh weather the day of the sixteenth stage and beforehand, much snow had been deposited along the roads that were to be used. Organizers made the choice to cancel the stage because of the conditions that also included sub-freezing temperatures. Riders primarily agreed with the decision as it was best for rider safety, but Hampsten believed that the stage could have provided some chances to attack then race leader Fignon. A L'Impartial writer described how race organizer Torriani had been creating race routes that favored sprinters and average climbers like Francesco Moser and Giuseppe Saronni in the early 1980s and late 1970s, but had made the race more exciting as of late.

Stage characteristics and winners
Stage	Date	Course	Distance	Type	Winner
1	21 May	Taormina to Catania	123 km (76 mi)	Plain stage	Jean-Paul van Poppel (NED)
2	22 May	Catania to Mount Etna	132 km (82 mi)	Stage with mountain(s)	Acácio da Silva (POR)
3	23 May	Villafranca Tirrena to Messina	32.5 km (20 mi)	Team time trial	Ariostea
4	24 May	Scilla to Cosenza	204 km (127 mi)	Stage with mountain(s)	Rolf Järmann (SUI)
5	25 May	Cosenza to Potenza	275 km (171 mi)	Stage with mountain(s)	Stefano Giuliani (ITA)
6	26 May	Potenza to Campobasso	223 km (139 mi)	Stage with mountain(s)	Stephan Joho (SUI)
7	27 May	Isernia to Rome	208 km (129 mi)	Plain stage	Urs Freuler (SUI)
8	28 May	Rome to Gran Sasso d'Italia	179 km (111 mi)	Stage with mountain(s)	John Carlsen (DEN)
9	29 May	L'Aquila to Gubbio	221 km (137 mi)	Stage with mountain(s)	Bjarne Riis (DEN)
10	30 May	Pesaro to Riccione	36.8 km (23 mi)	Individual time trial	Lech Piasecki (POL)
11	31 May	Riccione to Mantua	244 km (152 mi)	Plain stage	Urs Freuler (SUI)
12	1 June	Mantua to Mira	148 km (92 mi)	Plain stage	Mario Cipollini (ITA)
13	2 June	Padua to Auronzo di Cadore	207 km (129 mi)	Stage with mountain(s)	Luis Herrera (COL)
14	3 June	Auronzo di Cadore to Corvara	131 km (81 mi)	Stage with mountain(s)	Flavio Giupponi (ITA)
15a	4 June	Corvara to Trento	131 km (81 mi)	Plain stage	Jean-Paul van Poppel (NED)
15b	4 June	Trento to Trento	83.2 km (52 mi)	Stage with mountain(s)	Lech Piasecki (POL)
16	5 June	Trento to Santa Caterina di Valfurva	~~208 km (129 mi)~~	Stage with mountain(s)	Stage Cancelled
17	6 June	Sondrio to Meda	137 km (85 mi)	Stage with mountain(s)	Phil Anderson (AUS)
18	7 June	Mendrisio (Switzerland) to Monte Generoso (Switzerland)	10.7 km (7 mi)	Individual time trial	Luis Herrera (COL)
19	8 June	Meda to Tortona	198 km (123 mi)	Plain stage	Jesper Skibby (DEN)
20	9 June	Voghera to La Spezia	220 km (137 mi)	Stage with mountain(s)	Laurent Fignon (FRA)
21	10 June	La Spezia to Prato	216 km (134 mi)	Stage with mountain(s)	Gianni Bugno (ITA)
22	11 June	Prato to Florence	53 km (33 mi)	Individual time trial	Lech Piasecki (POL)
	Total		3,418 km (2,124 mi)		

== Classification leadership ==
Four different jerseys were worn during the 1989 Giro d'Italia. The leader of the general classification – calculated by adding the stage finish times of each rider, and allowing time bonuses for the first three finishers on mass-start stages – wore a pink jersey. This classification is the most important of the race, and its winner is considered as the winner of the Giro. There were no time bonuses awarded for stage placings.

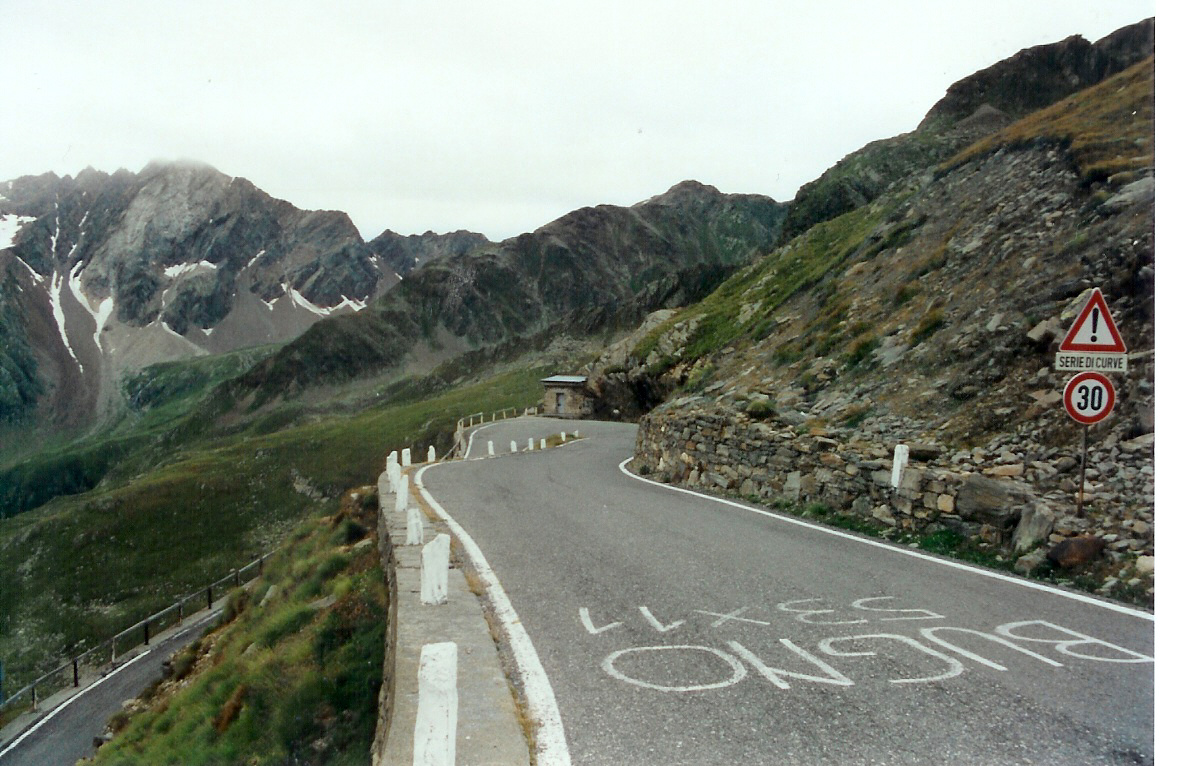
The Passo di Gavia was the Cima Coppi for the 1989 Giro d'Italia.

For the points classification, which awarded a purple (or cyclamen) jersey to its leader, cyclists were given points for finishing a stage in the top 15; additional points could also be won in intermediate sprints. The green jersey was awarded to the mountains classification leader. In this ranking, points were won by reaching the summit of a climb ahead of other cyclists. Each climb was ranked as either first, second or third category, with more points available for higher category climbs. The Cima Coppi, the race's highest point of elevation, awarded more points than the other first category climbs. The Cima Coppi for this Giro was the Passo di Gavia, but due to inclement weather, the stage containing the Gavia was cancelled. The white jersey was worn by the leader of young rider classification, a ranking decided the same way as the general classification, but considering only neo-professional cyclists (in their first three years of professional racing).

The intergiro classification was introduced as a means of making the race more interesting and its leader was denoted by a blue jersey. The calculation for the intergiro is similar to that of the general classification, in each stage there is a midway point that the riders pass through a point and where their time is stopped. As the race goes on, their times compiled and the person with the lowest time is the leader of the intergiro classification and wears the blue jersey. The first three to cross the sprint line would receive five, three, and two second time bonuses towards the general classification. Although no jersey was awarded, there was also one classification for the teams, in which the stage finish times of the best three cyclists per team were added; the leading team was the one with the lowest total time.

The rows in the following table correspond to the jerseys awarded after that stage was run.

Classification leadership by stage
Stage	Winner	General classification	Points classification	Mountains classification	Young rider classification	Team classification
1	Jean-Paul van Poppel	Jean-Paul van Poppel	Jean-Paul van Poppel	not awarded	?	Atala
2	Acácio da Silva	Acácio da Silva	Acácio da Silva	Acácio da Silva	Piotr Ugrumov	Chateau d'Ax
3	Ariostea	Silvino Contini	Acácio da Silva	Acácio da Silva	Piotr Ugrumov	Chateau d'Ax
4	Rolf Järmann	Silvino Contini	Acácio da Silva	?	Piotr Ugrumov	Chateau d'Ax
5	Stefano Giuliani	Silvino Contini	Acácio da Silva	?	Piotr Ugrumov	Chateau d'Ax
6	Stefan Joho	Silvino Contini	Acácio da Silva	?	Piotr Ugrumov	Chateau d'Ax
7	Urs Freuler	Silvino Contini	Giovanni Fidanza	?	Piotr Ugrumov	Chateau d'Ax
8	John Carlsen	Erik Breukink	Giovanni Fidanza	?	Piotr Ugrumov	Fagor
9	Bjarne Riis	Acácio da Silva	Acácio da Silva	?	Piotr Ugrumov	Fagor
10	Lech Piasecki	Erik Breukink	Rolf Sörensen	?	Piotr Ugrumov	Alfa Lum
11	Urs Freuler	Erik Breukink	Rolf Sörensen	?	Piotr Ugrumov	Alfa Lum
12	Mario Cipollini	Erik Breukink	Rolf Sörensen	?	Piotr Ugrumov	Alfa Lum
13	Luis Herrera	Erik Breukink	Giovanni Fidanza	?	Piotr Ugrumov	Fagor
14	Flavio Giupponi	Laurent Fignon	Giovanni Fidanza	?	Vladimir Poulnikov	Fagor
15a	Jean-Paul van Poppel	Laurent Fignon	Giovanni Fidanza	Luis Herrera	Piotr Ugrumov	Fagor
15b	Lech Piasecki	Laurent Fignon	Giovanni Fidanza	Luis Herrera	Piotr Ugrumov	Fagor
16	Stage Cancelled	Laurent Fignon	Giovanni Fidanza	Luis Herrera	Piotr Ugrumov	Fagor
17	Phil Anderson	Laurent Fignon	Giovanni Fidanza	Luis Herrera	Piotr Ugrumov	Fagor
18	Luis Herrera	Laurent Fignon	Giovanni Fidanza	Luis Herrera	Vladimir Poulnikov	Fagor
19	Jesper Skibby	Laurent Fignon	Giovanni Fidanza	Luis Herrera	Vladimir Poulnikov	Fagor
20	Laurent Fignon	Laurent Fignon	Giovanni Fidanza	Luis Herrera	Vladimir Poulnikov	Fagor
21	Gianni Bugno	Laurent Fignon	Giovanni Fidanza	Luis Herrera	Vladimir Poulnikov	Fagor
22	Lech Piasecki	Laurent Fignon	Giovanni Fidanza	Luis Herrera	Vladimir Poulnikov	Fagor
Final		Laurent Fignon	Giovanni Fidanza	Luis Herrera	Vladimir Poulnikov	Fagor

== Final standings ==
Legend
A pink jersey	Denotes the winner of the General classification	A green jersey	Denotes the winner of the Mountains classification
A purple jersey	Denotes the winner of the Points classification	A white jersey	Denotes the winner of the Young rider classification
A blue jersey	Denotes the winner of the Intergiro classification		

=== General classification ===
Final general classification (1–10)
Rank	Name	Team	Time
1	Laurent Fignon (FRA)	Système U	93h 30' 16"
2	Flavio Giupponi (ITA)	Malvor	+ 1' 15"
3	Andrew Hampsten (USA)	7 Eleven-American Airlines	+ 2' 46"
4	Erik Breukink (NED)	Panasonic–Isostar–Colnago–Agu	+ 5' 02"
5	Franco Chioccioli (ITA)	Del Tongo	+ 5' 43"
6	Urs Zimmermann (SUI)	Carrera Jeans–Vagabond	+ 6' 28"
7	Claude Criquielion (BEL)	Hitachi	+ 6' 34"
8	Marco Giovannetti (ITA)	Seur	+ 7' 44"
9	Stephen Roche (IRL)	Fagor	+ 8' 09"
10	Marino Lejarreta (ESP)	Caja Rural	+ 8' 09"

=== Points classification ===
Final points classification (1–5)
	Rider	Team	Points
1	Giovanni Fidanza (ITA)	Chateau d'Ax	172
2	Laurent Fignon (FRA)	Système U	139
3	Erik Breukink (NED)	Panasonic–Isostar–Colnago–Agu	128
4	Claudio Chiappucci (ITA)	Carrera Jeans–Vagabond	116
5	Acácio da Silva (POR)	Carrera Jeans–Vagabond	111

=== Mountains classification ===
Final mountains classification (1–5)
	Rider	Team	Points
1	Luis Herrera (COL)	Café de Colombia	70
2	Stefano Giuliani (ITA)	Jolly	38
3	Henry Cardenas (COL)	Café de Colombia	34
3	Jure Pavlič (YUG)	Carrera Jeans–Vagabond	34
5	Flavio Giupponi (ITA)	Malvor	28

=== Young rider classification ===
Final young rider classification (1–5)
	Rider	Team	Time
1	Vladimir Poulnikov (URS)	Alfa Lum	93h 40' 06"
2	Piotr Ugrumov (URS)	Alfa Lum	+ 4' 37"
3	Luca Gelfi (ITA)	Del Tongo	+ 27' 49"
4	Jos van Aert (NED)	Hitachi	+ 31' 00"
5	Jure Pavlič (YUG)	Carrera Jeans–Vagabond	+ 39' 24"

=== Intergiro classification ===
Final intergiro classification (1–3)
	Rider	Team	Time
1	Jure Pavlič (YUG)	Carrera Jeans–Vagabond	49h 50' 00"
2	Laurent Fignon (FRA)	Système U	+ 4' 07"
3	Claude Criquielion (BEL)	Hitachi	+ 4' 24"
4	Flavio Giupponi (ITA)	Malvor	+ 4' 32"
5	Jesper Skibby (DEN)	TVM	+ 4' 54"

=== Combativity classification ===
Final combativity classification (1–5)
	Rider	Team	Points
1	Stefano Giuliani (ITA)	Jolly	98
2	Peter Winnen (NED)	Panasonic–Isostar–Colnago–Agu	54
3	Phil Anderson (AUS)	TVM	48
4	Jesper Worre (DEN)	Café de Colombia	28
5	John Carlsen (DEN)	Fagor	24

=== Intermediate sprints classification ===
Final intermediate sprints classification (1–5)
	Rider	Team	Points
1	Luigi Bielli (ITA)	Del Tongo	35
2	Alessio Di Basco (ITA)	Fanini-Seven Up	31
3	Stefanino Cecini (ITA)	Jolly	21
4	Danilo Gioia (ITA)	Atala	18
4	Andrei Tchmil (URS)	Alfa Lum	12

=== Final kilometer classification ===
Final final kilometer classification (1–5)
	Rider	Team	Points
1	Laurent Fignon (FRA)	Système U	14
2	Gianni Bugno (ITA)	Chateau d'Ax	10
3	Rolf Järmann (SUI)	Frank	10
4	Stefano Giuliani (ITA)	Jolly	9
4	Luis Herrera (COL)	Café de Colombia	8

=== Team classification ===
Final team classification (1–4)
	Team	Time
1	Fagor	279h 59' 13"
2	Caja Rural	+ 13' 27"
3	Alfa Lum	+ 16' 11"
4	Seur	+ 16' 37"
5	Del Tongo	+ 20' 35"
