= Paul Popp =

Austrian cyclist

Personal information
- Born: 2 February 1963 (age 63) Vienna, Austria

Cycling career
- Sport: Cycling

Paul Popp (born 2 February 1963) is an Austrian former cyclist. He competed in three events at the 1984 Summer Olympics. He won the Austrian National Road Race Championships in 1986.
