= Lech Piasecki =

Polish cyclist

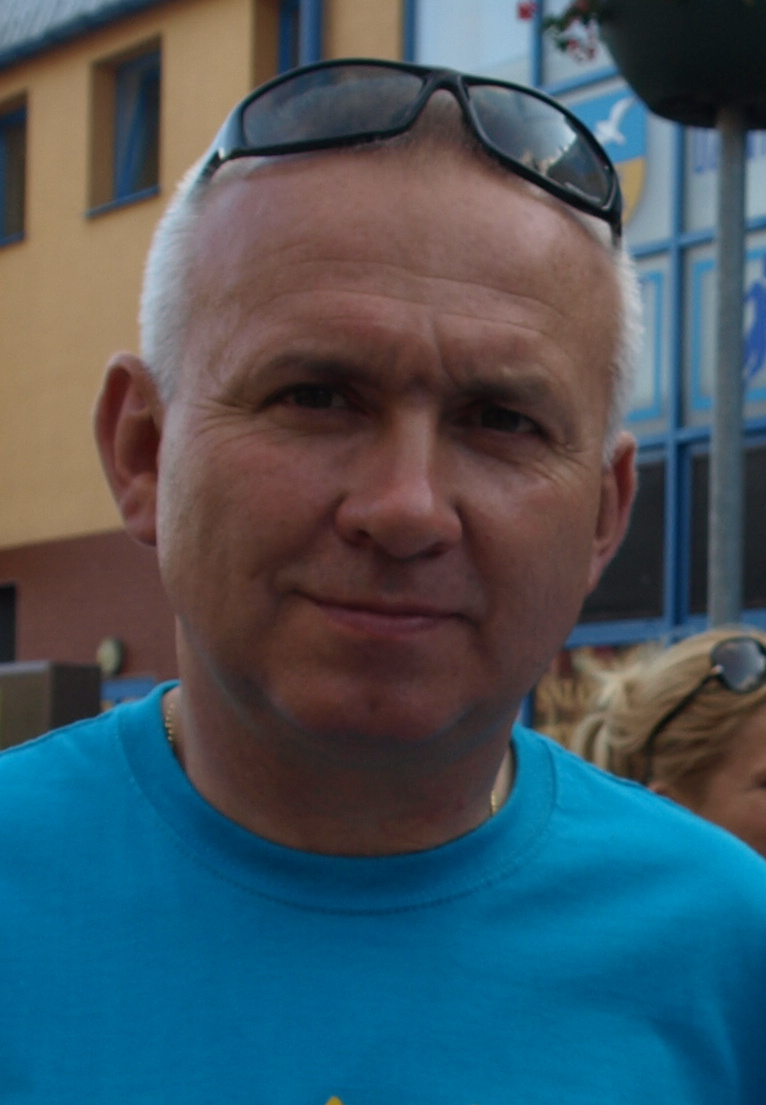

Personal information
- Full name: Lech Piasecki
- Born: 13 November 1961 (age 64) Poznań, Poland

Cycling career
- Sport: Cycling
- Discipline: Road/Track
- Role: Rider

Professional teams
- 1986–1988: Del Tongo
- 1989: Malvor-Sidi
- 1990: Diana-Colnago
- 1991: Colnago-Lampre

Major wins
- Grand Tours Giro d'Italia 5 individual stages (1986, 1988, 1989)
Medal record
Representing Poland
Men's road bicycle racing
World Championships
Gold medal – first place	1985 Giavara del Montello	Amateur's Road Race

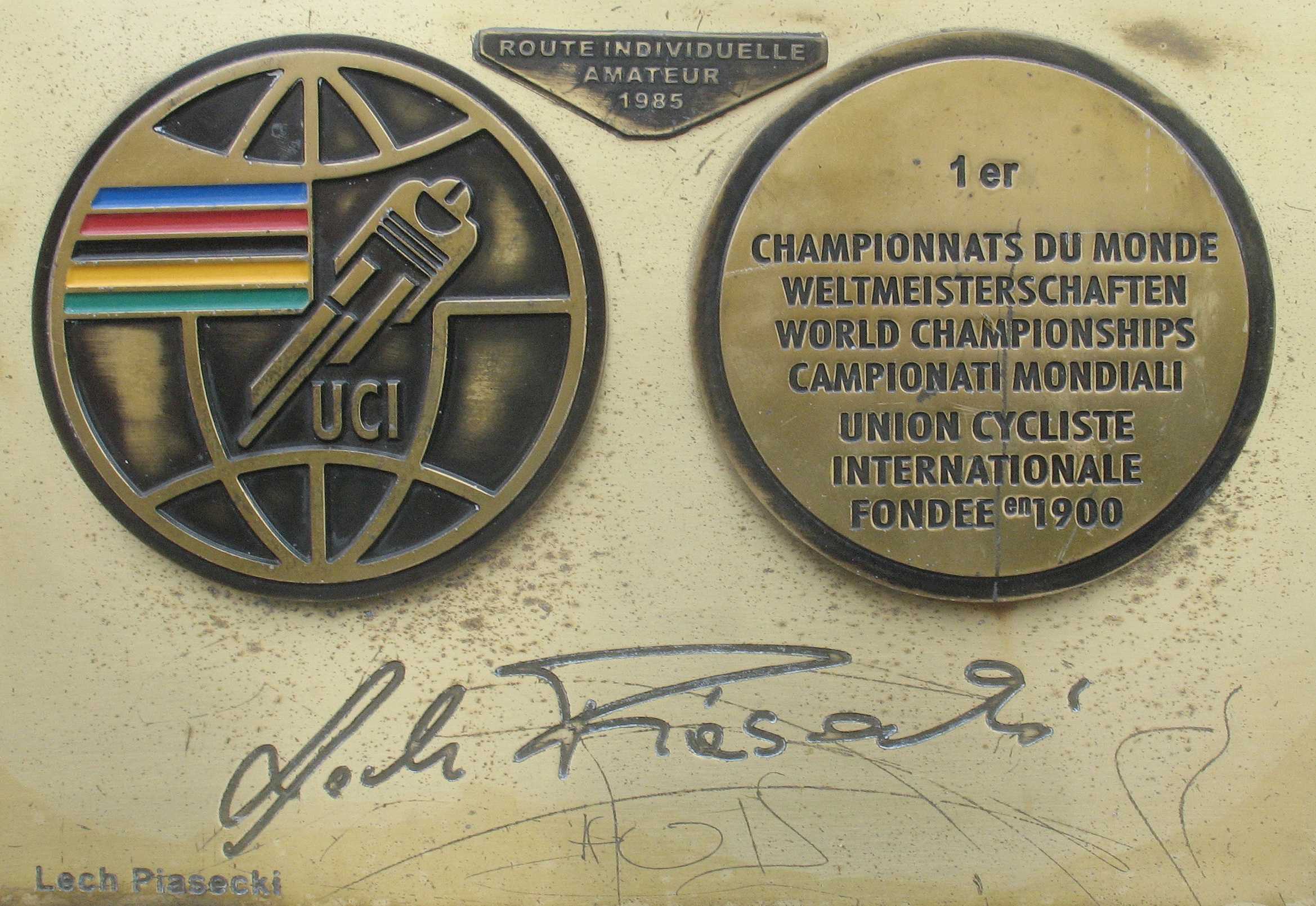
Copy of L. Piasecki medal and autograph in Sports Star Avenue in Dziwnów

Lech Piasecki (born 13 November 1961) is a Polish former racing cyclist. Born in Poznań, he became the first Polish cyclist to wear the yellow jersey in the Tour de France, in 1987.

After Piasecki became Amateur world champion in 1985, the Colnago team wanted to sign him. The Polish cycling organisation allowed that in exchange for bicycles. His first victory as a professional cyclist was in a time trial in the 1986 Giro d'Italia, where he beat many favourites. In 1987, he won the first stage of the Tirreno–Adriatico. It was a time trial in which he started early, and the wind changed direction after Piasecki finished, so the main favourites who started later had a disadvantage. In the 1987 Tour de France, Piasecki became second in the prologue, and took the yellow jersey after finishing in the lead group of Stage 2. After he lost the lead on Stage 4, he had to abandon the 7th stage due to illness. On 24 August 1988 he became World Track Champion in individual pursuit. The following year Piasecki put forth a remarkable performance during the 1989 Giro d'Italia by winning three stages including two ITT stages, as well as a high mountain stage.

== Career achievements ==
1982
1st Stage 7a, Milk Race
1983
6th Overall Tour de Pologne

1st Stage 6

1984
3rd Polish National Road Race Championships
1985
1st UCI Road World Championships, Amateurs
1st Overall Peace Race

1st Stages 1, 7, 8 & 11

1986
1st Tour de Romagna
1st Florence-Pistoia
1st Stage 12 (ITT) Giro d'Italia
1st Stage 3, Tour de l'Aude
1st Trofeo Baracchi (with Giuseppe Saronni)
1987
1st Stage 1 Tirreno–Adriatico
1988
1st Stage 21b (ITT) Giro d'Italia
1st Trofeo Baracchi (with Czesław Lang)
1989
1st Tour de Friuli
1st Stage 7 Tirreno–Adriatico
Giro d'Italia

1st Stages 10 (ITT), 15b & 22 (ITT)

1990
1st Florence-Pistoia

== Tour de France ==
- 1987 Tour de France - did not finish. Wore yellow jersey for 2 consecutive days, the first and so far only Polish cyclist to do so.
