= Flavio Giupponi =

Italian cyclist (born 1964)

Personal information
- Full name: Flavio Giupponi
- Born: 9 May 1964 (age 62) Bergamo, Italy

Cycling career
- Sport: Cycling
- Discipline: Road
- Role: Rider

Professional teams
- 1985–1988: Del Tongo–Colnago
- 1989: Malvor–Sidi
- 1990–1991: Carrera Jeans–Vagabond
- 1992–1993: Mercatone Uno–Medeghini–Zucchini
- 1994: Brescialat–Ceramiche Refin

Flavio Giupponi (born 9 May 1964 in Bergamo) is an Italian former professional road racing cyclist.

== Professional career ==
Giupponi was as professional cyclist from 1985 to 1994. His best Grand Tour result was at the 1989 Giro d'Italia where he won Stage 14 in the high mountains and finished on the podium in 2nd place overall just 1:15 behind Laurent Fignon. He also won the Giro dell'Appennino in 1990.

== Major results ==
1984
2nd GP Capodarco
1985
1st Overall Giro delle Regioni

1st Stage 2b

1st Overall Giro della Valle d'Aosta
1st Overall Settimana Ciclistica Lombarda
1986
1st Stage 3 Giro d'Italia (TTT)
6th Giro di Lombardia
1987
2nd Milano–Torino
5th Overall Giro d'Italia
8th Giro di Lombardia
1988
1st Cronostaffetta (TTT)
1st Stage 3 Volta a Catalunya (TTT)
4th Overall Giro d'Italia
1989
2nd Overall Giro d'Italia

1st Stage 14

1990
1st Giro dell'Appennino
3rd National Road Race Championships
3rd Gran Premio Città di Camaiore
1991
9th Tre Valli Varesine
1994
8th Overall Tour de Suisse

=== Grand Tour general classification results timeline ===
| Grand Tour | 1986 | 1987 | 1988 | 1989 | 1990 | 1991 | 1992 | 1993 | 1994 |
|---|---|---|---|---|---|---|---|---|---|
| Vuelta a España | — | — | — | DNF | — | DNF | 101 | DNF | DNF |
| Giro d'Italia | 43 | 5 | 4 | 2 | 17 | DNF | 14 | 11 | 17 |
| Tour de France | — | — | — | — | DNF | — | — | — | — |

Legend
| — | Did not compete |
| DNF | Did not finish |
