= Jim Ochowicz =

American racing cyclist

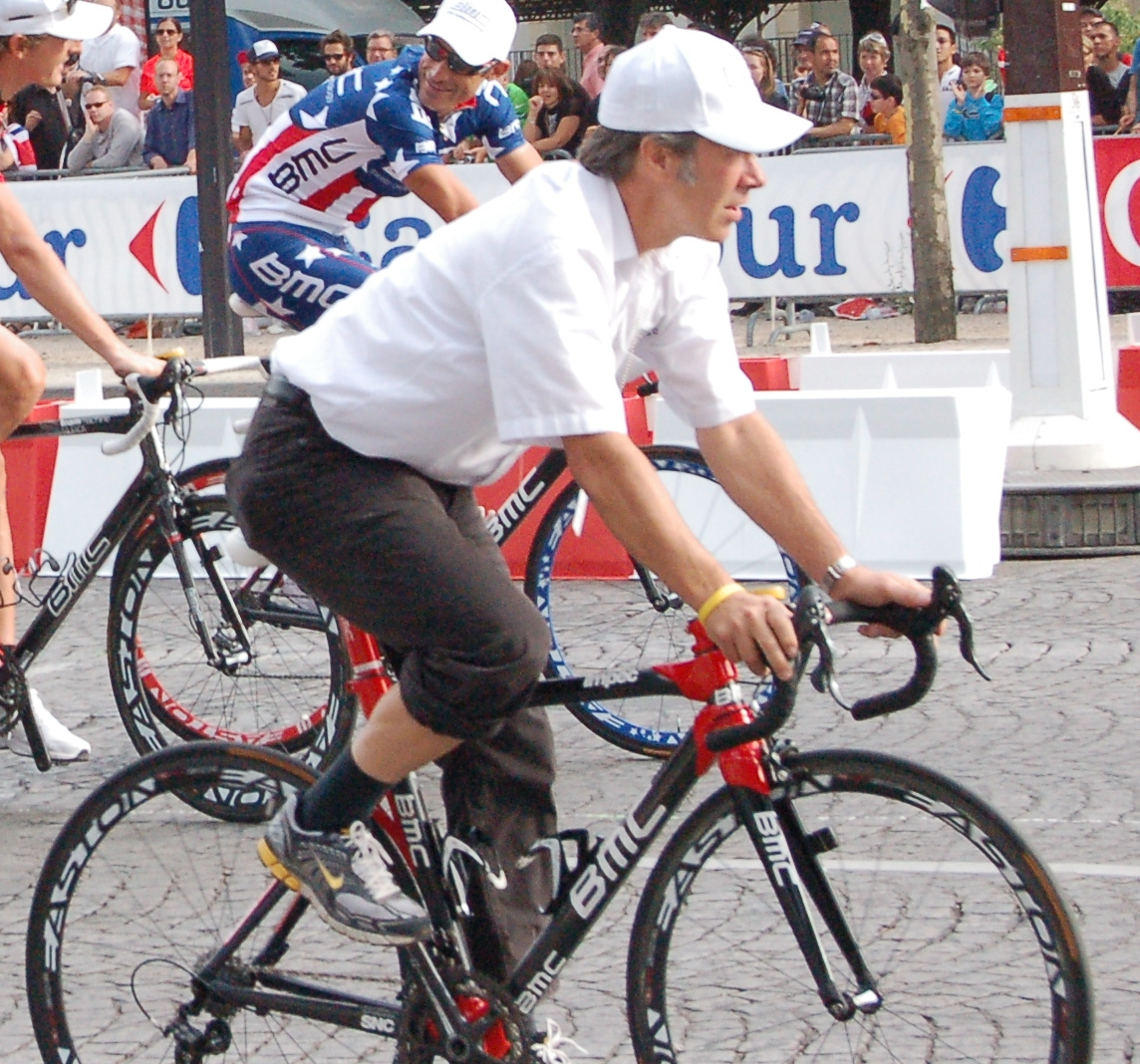
- Ochowicz at the Tour de France, 2010

Personal information
- Full name: Jim Lionel Ochowicz
- Nickname: Och
- Born: December 23, 1951 (age 74) United States

Cycling career
- Sport: Cycling
- Current team: CCC Pro Team
- Discipline: Road
- Role: Rider (retired); Team manager
- Rider type: Sprinter

Amateur team
- 1972, 1976: USA Olympic road cycling team

Managerial teams
- 1981–1995: 7-Eleven
- 2000, 2004, 2008: USA men's Olympic road
- 2007–: BMC Racing Team

Jim Ochowicz (born December 23, 1951) is a former Olympic bicyclist and manager of UCI WorldTeam CCC Pro Team. He served as president of the USA Cycling Board of Directors from 2002 to 2006.

Ochowicz participated in the 1972 Summer Olympics in the 4 km team pursuit cycling event. He was inducted into the United States Bicycling Hall of Fame in 1997 as a contributor to the sport of cycling.

== Team manager ==
In 1981, Ochowicz founded the successful 7-Eleven squad, which he managed through 1995, by which time it was known as Team Motorola.

In many ways Ochowicz is considered to be the father of professional cycling in the United States. While a handful of American riders rode professionally in Europe in the early 80's, including phenom Greg LeMond, it wasn't until the mid 80's that the first American team broke into the professional ranks of Europe. This was the 7-Eleven team formed by Ochowicz, which was the second American team to compete in a grand tour, and was initially founded to compete in track cycling events. Their first grand tour was the 1985 Giro. The race was dominated by the La Vie Claire team of Hinault and LeMond but the American team surprised the peloton with two stage wins. Ron Kiefel became the first American rider to win a grand tour stage and later in the race Andy Hampsten claimed a stage win and also finished the race in the top 5 of the Young Rider and Mountains classifications.

Hampsten would briefly leave the team to ride for LeMond on La Vie Claire for the 1986 Tour de France, but the 7-Eleven Team that entered the 1986 Tour was made up of several strong riders including Davis Phinney, Alex Steida, Eric Heiden and Bob Roll who early in the race made the infamous remark that the Americans were "cave men" who had come to the Tour to make some noise. Early in the race Steida became the first rider from North America to wear the maillot jaune, but later that afternoon in the split stage team time trial 7-Eleven had a disastrous performance and lost the jersey. The next day however, Davis Phinney claimed a stage win.

By 1988 Hampsten had rejoined 7-Eleven and was considered a contender for overall victory in the 1988 Giro d'Italia. During a snowstorm on the Gavia Pass, one of the most memorable stages in cycling history, he seized the Pink jersey and was able to defend his lead for the remainder of the race becoming the first American to win the Giro.

Ochowicz is a controversial figure, because it has been alleged by journalist David Walsh (who reported for many years on the Lance Armstrong doping case) and by Floyd Landis (original winner of the 2006 Tour de France before having this title stripped for anti-doping violations, and teammate of Lance Armstrong at the US Postal Service Cycling Team) that Ochowicz, during his time leading USA Cycling, knew about the doping undertaken by Armstrong and the rest of the US Postal team. It has also been "alleged" by Lance Armstrong that Ochowicz, during his time in charge of the Motorola Cycling Team (which Armstrong then rode for), orchestrated a $100,000 bribe to the rival Coors Light team in return for the Coors team deliberately losing three individual races in 1993, so that Armstrong could win.

In 2007 he began the BMC Racing Team, which first competed on the international professional cycling circuit in 2010. A major signing for the team was Australian rider Cadel Evans, who had been among the general classification favorites in several previous editions of the Tour. He showed promise in the 2010 Giro d'Italia, where he held the pink jersey for a stage, won a stage, won the overall Points Classification and placed 5th overall, but his performance in the 2010 Tour was disappointing as he finished about an hour behind the winner. In the 2011 Tour de France Evans was in top form. Going into the final ITT on stage 20 he was +0:04 behind Fränk Schleck and just under a minute behind Andy Schleck. Evans finished 2nd on the stage but easily overcame the deficits to the Schleck brothers and became Tour champion.

The following year Evans finished 7th but a promising up and comer, Tejay van Garderen finished in 5th place and won the white jersey awarded to the best young rider. Van Garderen would finish 5th again in the 2014 Tour de France and in 2015 he was in position to finish on the podium when he became sick late in the race and had to abandon. For the 2016 season Ochowicz signed Richie Porte, who had been a super-domestique for Chris Froome on Team Sky to co-lead the team with van Garderen. BMC also had several other strong riders at this time including Greg Van Avermaet, Philippe Gilbert, the time trial specialist Rohan Dennis and Taylor Phinney. Porte finished 5th in the 2016 Tour de France and between 2016 and 2018 the team won several races including many team times trials as well as the Tour Down Under, Tirreno–Adriatico, Tour de Luxembourg, Tour de Suisse and a gold medal in the road race of the 2016 Summer Olympics with Van Avermaet.

During the 2018 Tour de France BMC won the team time trial and as a result there was a very rare tie for the yellow jersey between Van Avermaet and van Garderen. Van Avermaet was awarded the jersey and seemed to be in a position to hold it for several stages. At this time the team was struggling to maintain its sponsorship and even though they were in the lead at the biggest bike race in the world, their future as a team was uncertain. Ochowicz was able to secure a deal with Polish shoe manufacturer CCC to ensure the continued existence of the team. Meanwhile, the Tour rolled on and Van Avermaet was able to stay in the lead for eight stages. By 2021 the team had changed sponsors again, this time to Intermarché-Wanty-Gobert Matériaux. Despite no longer being a dominant team as they had been in the mid-2010s, they still performed strongly in major races including the 2021 Vuelta a España where Rein Taaramäe and Odd Christian Eiking both got involved in successful breakaways resulting in the team defending the leader's jersey for nearly half the race.

== Personal life ==
Jim Ochowicz is the husband of former track cyclist and Olympic speed skater Sheila Grace Young-Ochowicz and the father of Olympic speed skater Elli Ochowicz.
