= 1994 UCI Road World Cup =

- Sixth edition of the UCI Road World Cup

Details
- Dates: 28 March – 21 October
- Location: Europe
- Races: 10

Champions
- Individual champion: Gianluca Bortolami (ITA) (Mapei–CLAS)
- Teams' champion: Mapei–CLAS

The 1994 UCI Road World Cup was the sixth edition of the UCI Road World Cup. It was won surprisingly by Italian classics specialist Gianluca Bortolami of the Mapei–CLAS team, after a summer exploit ahed of Johan Museeuw and Andrei Tchmil, who lost a big lead built after the spring races.

== Races ==
Date	Race	Country	Winner	Team	World Cup Leader	Leader's Team	Report
19 March	Milan–San Remo	Italy	Giorgio Furlan (ITA)	Gewiss–Ballan	Giorgio Furlan (ITA)	Gewiss–Ballan	Report
3 April	Tour of Flanders	Belgium	Gianni Bugno (ITA)	Team Polti–Vaporetto	Gianni Bugno (ITA)	Team Polti–Vaporetto	Report
10 April	Paris–Roubaix	France	Andrei Tchmil (MDA)	Lotto	Andrei Tchmil (MDA)	Lotto	Report
17 April	Liège–Bastogne–Liège	Belgium	Evgeni Berzin (RUS)	Gewiss–Ballan	Andrei Tchmil (MDA)	Lotto	Report
23 April	Amstel Gold Race	Netherlands	Johan Museeuw (BEL)	GB–MG Maglificio	Andrei Tchmil (MDA)	Lotto	Report
6 August	Clásica de San Sebastián	Spain	Armand de Las Cuevas (FRA)	Castorama	Andrei Tchmil (MDA)	Lotto	Report
14 August	Leeds International Classic	Great Britain	Gianluca Bortolami (ITA)	Mapei–CLAS	Andrei Tchmil (MDA)	Lotto	Report
21 August	Züri-Metzgete	Switzerland	Gianluca Bortolami (ITA)	Mapei–CLAS	Johan Museeuw (BEL)	GB–MG Maglificio	Report
2 October	Paris–Tours	France	Erik Zabel (GER)	Team Telekom	Gianluca Bortolami (ITA)	Mapei–CLAS	Report
8 October	Giro di Lombardia	Italy	Vladislav Bobrik (RUS)	Gewiss–Ballan	Gianluca Bortolami (ITA)	Mapei–CLAS	Report

== Single races details ==
worldcupjersey	Denotes the Classification Leader

In the race results the leader jersey identify the rider who wore the jersey in the race (the leader at the start of the race).

In the general classification table the jersey identify the leader after the race.

19 March 1994 — Milan–San Remo 294 km (182.7 mi)

	Rider	Team	Time
1	Giorgio Furlan (ITA)	Gewiss–Ballan	7h 05' 20"
2	Mario Cipollini (ITA)	Mercatone Uno–Medeghini	+ 20"
3	Adriano Baffi (ITA)	Mercatone Uno–Medeghini	s.t.
4	Stefano Zanini (ITA)	Navigare–Blue Storm	s.t.
5	Kai Hundertmarck (GER)	Motorola	s.t.
6	Fabio Baldato (ITA)	GB–MG Maglificio	s.t.
7	Ángel Edo (ESP)	Kelme–Avianca–Gios	s.t.
8	Fabiano Fontanelli (ITA)	ZG Mobili	s.t.
9	Andrei Tchmil (MDA)	Lotto	s.t.
10	Laurent Jalabert (FRA)	ONCE	s.t.

General classification after Milan–San Remo

	Rider	Team	Points
1	Giorgio Furlan (ITA)	Gewiss–Ballan	50
2	Mario Cipollini (ITA)	Mercatone Uno–Medeghini	35
3	Adriano Baffi (ITA)	Mercatone Uno–Medeghini	25
4	Stefano Zanini (ITA)	Navigare–Blue Storm	20
5	Kai Hundertmarck (GER)	Motorola	18
6	Fabio Baldato (ITA)	GB–MG Maglificio	16
7	Ángel Edo (ESP)	Kelme–Avianca–Gios	14
8	Fabiano Fontanelli (ITA)	ZG Mobili	12
9	Andrei Tchmil (MDA)	Lotto	10
10	Laurent Jalabert (FRA)	ONCE	8

3 April 1994 — Tour of Flanders 268 km (166.5 mi)

	Rider	Team	Time
1	Gianni Bugno (ITA)	Team Polti–Vaporetto	6h 45' 20"
2	Johan Museeuw (BEL)	GB–MG Maglificio	s.t.
3	Andrei Tchmil (MDA)	Lotto	s.t.
4	Franco Ballerini (ITA)	Mapei–CLAS	s.t.
5	Johan Capiot (BEL)	TVM–Bison Kit	+ 1' 11"
6	Fabio Baldato (ITA)	GB–MG Maglificio	+ 1' 54"
7	Guido Bontempi (ITA)	Gewiss–Ballan	s.t.
8	Marc Sergeant (BEL)	Novemail–Histor–Laser Computer	s.t.
9	Edwig Van Hooydonck (BEL)	WordPerfect–Colnago–Decca	s.t.
10	Frank Corvers (BEL)	Collstrop–Willy Naessens	s.t.

General classification after Tour of Flanders

	Rider	Team	Points
1	Gianni Bugno (ITA)	Team Polti–Vaporetto	50
2	Giorgio Furlan (ITA)	Gewiss–Ballan	50
3	Johan Museeuw (BEL)	GB–MG Maglificio	40
4	Mario Cipollini (ITA)	Mercatone Uno–Medeghini	35
5	Andrei Tchmil (MDA)	Lotto	35
6	Fabio Baldato (ITA)	GB–MG Maglificio	32
7	Adriano Baffi (ITA)	Mercatone Uno–Medeghini	25
8	Franco Ballerini (ITA)	Mapei–CLAS	20
8	Stefano Zanini (ITA)	Navigare–Blue Storm	20
10	Johan Capiot (BEL)	TVM–Bison Kit	18
10	Kai Hundertmarck (GER)	Motorola	18

10 April 1994 — Paris–Roubaix 270 km (167.8 mi)

	Rider	Team	Time
1	Andrei Tchmil (MDA)	Lotto	7h 28' 02"
2	Fabio Baldato (ITA)	GB–MG Maglificio	+ 1' 13"
3	Franco Ballerini (ITA)	Mapei–CLAS	s.t.
4	Olaf Ludwig (GER)	Team Telekom	+ 1' 26"
5	Sean Yates (GBR)	Motorola	s.t.
6	Johan Capiot (BEL)	TVM–Bison Kit	s.t.
7	Gilbert Duclos-Lassalle (FRA)	GAN	s.t.
8	Ludwig Willems (BEL)	GB–MG Maglificio	+ 1' 31"
9	Frankie Andreu (USA)	Motorola	+ 4' 14"
10	Nico Verhoeven (NED)	Novemail–Histor–Laser Computer	s.t.

General classification after Paris–Roubaix

	Rider	Team	Points
1	Andrei Tchmil (MDA)	Lotto	85
2	Fabio Baldato (ITA)	GB–MG Maglificio	67
3	Gianni Bugno (ITA)	Team Polti–Vaporetto	50
4	Giorgio Furlan (ITA)	Gewiss–Ballan	50
5	Franco Ballerini (ITA)	Mapei–CLAS	45
6	Johan Museeuw (BEL)	GB–MG Maglificio	40
7	Mario Cipollini (ITA)	Mercatone Uno–Medeghini	35
8	Johan Capiot (BEL)	TVM–Bison Kit	34
9	Adriano Baffi (ITA)	Mercatone Uno–Medeghini	25
10	Olaf Ludwig (GER)	Team Telekom	20
10	Stefano Zanini (ITA)	Navigare–Blue Storm	20

17 April 1994 — Liège–Bastogne–Liège 268.5 km (166.8 mi)

	Rider	Team	Time
1	Evgeni Berzin (RUS)	Gewiss–Ballan	7h 16' 30"
2	Lance Armstrong (USA)	Motorola	+ 1' 37"
3	Giorgio Furlan (ITA)	Gewiss–Ballan	s.t.
4	Claudio Chiappucci (ITA)	Carrera Jeans–Tassoni	s.t.
5	Stefano Della Santa (ITA)	Mapei–CLAS	s.t.
6	Tony Rominger (SUI)	Mapei–CLAS	+ 2' 03"
7	Max Sciandri (ITA)	GB–MG Maglificio	+ 5' 38"
8	Marco Saligari (ITA)	GB–MG Maglificio	+ 5' 42"
9	Bruno Cenghialta (ITA)	Gewiss–Ballan	+ 5' 52"
10	Alberto Elli (ITA)	GB–MG Maglificio	+ 5' 58"

General classification after Liège–Bastogne–Liège

	Rider	Team	Points
1	Andrei Tchmil (MDA)	Lotto	91
2	Giorgio Furlan (ITA)	Gewiss–Ballan	75
3	Fabio Baldato (ITA)	GB–MG Maglificio	67
4	Evgeni Berzin (RUS)	Gewiss–Ballan	50
5	Gianni Bugno (ITA)	Team Polti–Vaporetto	50
6	Franco Ballerini (ITA)	Mapei–CLAS	50
7	Johan Museeuw (BEL)	GB–MG Maglificio	40
8	Lance Armstrong (USA)	Motorola	35
9	Mario Cipollini (ITA)	Mercatone Uno–Medeghini	35
10	Johan Capiot (BEL)	TVM–Bison Kit	34

23 April 1994 — Amstel Gold Race 250 km (155.3 mi)

	Rider	Team	Time
1	Johan Museeuw (BEL)	GB–MG Maglificio	6h 42' 34"
2	Bruno Cenghialta (ITA)	Gewiss–Ballan	s.t.
3	Marco Saligari (ITA)	GB–MG Maglificio	+ 7"
4	Alberto Volpi (ITA)	Gewiss–Ballan	s.t.
5	Davide Rebellin (ITA)	GB–MG Maglificio	s.t.
6	Steven Rooks (NED)	TVM–Bison Kit	s.t.
7	Claudio Chiappucci (ITA)	Carrera Jeans–Tassoni	s.t.
8	Gérard Rué (FRA)	Banesto	s.t.
9	Richard Virenque (FRA)	Festina–Lotus	s.t.
10	Didier Rous (FRA)	GAN	s.t.

General classification after Amstel Gold Race

	Rider	Team	Points
1	Andrei Tchmil (MDA)	Lotto	97
2	Johan Museeuw (BEL)	GB–MG Maglificio	90
3	Giorgio Furlan (ITA)	Gewiss–Ballan	75
4	Fabio Baldato (ITA)	GB–MG Maglificio	67
5	Evgeni Berzin (RUS)	Gewiss–Ballan	50
6	Gianni Bugno (ITA)	Team Polti–Vaporetto	50
7	Franco Ballerini (ITA)	Mapei–CLAS	50
8	Bruno Cenghialta (ITA)	Gewiss–Ballan	45
9	Marco Saligari (ITA)	GB–MG Maglificio	37
10	Mario Cipollini (ITA)	Mercatone Uno–Medeghini	35

6 August 1994 — Clásica de San Sebastián 238 km (147.9 mi)

	Rider	Team	Time
1	Armand de Las Cuevas (FRA)	Castorama	5h 24' 44"
2	Lance Armstrong (USA)	Motorola	+ 1' 56"
3	Stefano Della Santa (ITA)	Mapei–CLAS	+ 1' 57"
4	Vladimir Poulnikov (UKR)	Carrera Jeans–Tassoni	+ 2' 03"
5	Andrei Tchmil (MDA)	Lotto	+ 2' 09"
6	Gianluca Bortolami (ITA)	Mapei–CLAS	+ 2' 09"
7	Pello Ruiz Cabestany (ESP)	Euskadi–Petronor	+ 2' 09"
8	José Ramón Uriarte (ESP)	Banesto	+ 2' 09"
9	Ángel Edo (ESP)	Kelme–Avianca–Gios	+ 2' 09"
10	Gianni Bugno (ITA)	Team Polti–Vaporetto	+ 2' 09"

General classification after Clásica de San Sebastián

	Rider	Team	Points
1	Andrei Tchmil (MDA)	Lotto	115
2	Johan Museeuw (BEL)	GB–MG Maglificio	90
3	Giorgio Furlan (ITA)	Gewiss–Ballan	75
4	Lance Armstrong (USA)	Motorola	70
5	Fabio Baldato (ITA)	GB–MG Maglificio	67
6	Gianni Bugno (ITA)	Team Polti–Vaporetto	58
7	Armand de Las Cuevas (FRA)	Castorama	50
8	Evgeni Berzin (RUS)	Gewiss–Ballan	50
9	Franco Ballerini (ITA)	Mapei–CLAS	50
10	Bruno Cenghialta (ITA)	Gewiss–Ballan	45

14 August 1994 — Leeds International Classic 231 km (143.5 mi)

	Rider	Team	Time
1	Gianluca Bortolami (ITA)	Mapei–CLAS	6h 03' 29"
2	Viatcheslav Ekimov (RUS)	WordPerfect–Colnago–Decca	s.t.
3	Bo Hamburger (DEN)	TVM–Bison Kit	+ 11"
4	Frankie Andreu (USA)	Motorola	s.t.
5	Laurent Dufaux (SUI)	ONCE	s.t.
6	Massimo Ghirotto (ITA)	ZG Mobili	s.t.
7	Max Sciandri (ITA)	GB–MG Maglificio	s.t.
8	Gianni Faresin (ITA)	Lampre–Panaria	s.t.
9	Stephen Swart (NZL)	Motorola	s.t.
10	Flavio Vanzella (ITA)	GB–MG Maglificio	+15"

General classification after Leeds International Classic

	Rider	Team	Points
1	Andrei Tchmil (MDA)	Lotto	115
2	Johan Museeuw (BEL)	GB–MG Maglificio	90
3	Giorgio Furlan (ITA)	Gewiss–Ballan	75
4	Lance Armstrong (USA)	Motorola	70
5	Fabio Baldato (ITA)	GB–MG Maglificio	67
6	Gianluca Bortolami (ITA)	Mapei–CLAS	66
7	Gianni Bugno (ITA)	Team Polti–Vaporetto	58
8	Armand de Las Cuevas (FRA)	Castorama	50
9	Evgeni Berzin (RUS)	Gewiss–Ballan	50
10	Franco Ballerini (ITA)	Mapei–CLAS	50

20 August 1994 — Züri-Metzgete 243.6 km (151.4 mi)

	Rider	Team	Time
1	Gianluca Bortolami (ITA)	Mapei–CLAS	6h 14' 11"
2	Johan Museeuw (BEL)	GB–MG Maglificio	s.t.
3	Maurizio Fondriest (ITA)	Lampre–Panaria	s.t.
4	Claudio Chiappucci (ITA)	Carrera Jeans–Tassoni	s.t.
5	Bjarne Riis (DEN)	Gewiss–Ballan	s.t.
6	Felice Puttini (SUI)	Brescialat–Ceramiche Refin	s.t.
7	Pascal Richard (SUI)	GB–MG Maglificio	s.t.
8	Giorgio Furlan (ITA)	Gewiss–Ballan	s.t.
9	Lance Armstrong (USA)	Motorola	s.t.
10	Francesco Casagrande (ITA)	Mercatone Uno–Medeghini	s.t.

General classification after Züri-Metzgete

	Rider	Team	Points
1	Johan Museeuw (BEL)	GB–MG Maglificio	125
2	Gianluca Bortolami (ITA)	Mapei–CLAS	116
3	Andrei Tchmil (MDA)	Lotto	115
4	Giorgio Furlan (ITA)	Gewiss–Ballan	87
5	Lance Armstrong (USA)	Motorola	80
6			
7			
8			
9			
10			

The first five riders rode at least the minimum races to be classified.

No sourced information for other positions.

2 October 1994 — Paris–Tours 250 km (155.3 mi)

	Rider	Team	Time
1	Erik Zabel (GER)	Team Telekom	6h 15' 37"
2	Gianluca Bortolami (ITA)	Mapei–CLAS	s.t.
3	Zbigniew Spruch (POL)	Lampre–Panaria	s.t.
4	Mario Cipollini (ITA)	Mercatone Uno–Medeghini	s.t.
5	Adri van der Poel (NED)	Collstrop–Willy Naessens	s.t.
6	Steve Bauer (CAN)	Motorola	s.t.
7	Giovanni Fidanza (ITA)	Team Polti–Vaporetto	s.t.
8	Laurent Jalabert (FRA)	ONCE	s.t.
9	Wilfried Nelissen (BEL)	Novemail–Histor–Laser Computer	s.t.
10	Martin van Steen (NED)	TVM–Bison Kit	s.t.

General classification after Paris–Tours

	Rider	Team	Points
1	Gianluca Bortolami (ITA)	Mapei–CLAS	151
2	Johan Museeuw (BEL)	GB–MG Maglificio	125
3	Andrei Tchmil (MDA)	Lotto	115
4	Giorgio Furlan (ITA)	Gewiss–Ballan	87
5	Lance Armstrong (USA)	Motorola	80
6			
7			
8			
9			
10			

The first five riders rode at least the minimum races to be classified.

No sourced information for other positions.

8 October 1994 — Giro di Lombardia 244 km (151.6 mi)

	Rider	Team	Time
1	Vladislav Bobrik (RUS)	Gewiss–Ballan	6h 03' 21"
2	Claudio Chiappucci (ITA)	Carrera Jeans–Tassoni	+ 2"
3	Pascal Richard (SUI)	GB–MG Maglificio	+ 3"
4	Dimitri Konyshev (RUS)	Jolly Componibili–Cage	+ 25"
5	Maurizio Fondriest (ITA)	Lampre–Panaria	s.t.
6	Davide Cassani (ITA)	GB–MG Maglificio	s.t.
7	Bjarne Riis (DEN)	Gewiss–Ballan	+ 30"
8	Udo Bölts (GER)	Team Telekom	s.t.
9	Mauro Gianetti (SUI)	Mapei–CLAS	s.t.
10	Maarten den Bakker (NED)	TVM–Bison Kit	+ 36"

General classification after Giro di Lombardia

	Rider	Team	Points
1	Gianluca Bortolami (ITA)	Mapei–CLAS	151
2	Johan Museeuw (BEL)	GB–MG Maglificio	125
3	Andrei Tchmil (MDA)	Lotto	115
4	Claudio Chiappucci (ITA)	Carrera Jeans–Tassoni	89
5	Giorgio Furlan (ITA)	Gewiss–Ballan	87
6	Lance Armstrong (USA)	Motorola	80
7			
8			
9			
10			

The first six riders rode at least the minimum races to be classified.

No sourced information for other positions.

== Final standings ==
=== Individual ===
Points are awarded to the top 12 classified riders. Riders must start at least 6 races to be classified.

The points are awarded for every race using the following system:

Position	1st	2nd	3rd	4th	5th	6th	7th	8th	9th	10th	11th	12th
Points	50	35	25	20	18	16	14	12	10	8	6	5

Pos.	Rider	Team	MSR	ToF	ROU	LBL	AGR	CSS	LEE	SUI	TOU	LOM	Pts.
1	Gianluca Bortolami (ITA)	Mapei–CLAS	0	?	?	?	?	16	50	50	35	0	151
2	Johan Museeuw (BEL)	GB–MG Maglificio	5	35	0	0	50	0	0	35	0	?	125
3	Andrei Tchmil (MDA)	Lotto	10	25	50	6	6	18	0	0	0	0	115
4	Claudio Chiappucci (ITA)	Carrera Jeans–Tassoni	0	?	?	20	14	0	DNS	20	?	35	89
5	Giorgio Furlan (ITA)	Gewiss–Ballan	50	?	?	25	0	0	DNS	12	0	0	87
6	Lance Armstrong (USA)	Motorola	0	?	?	35	0	35	0	10	0	?	80
Race winners not eligible for general classification or out of top 6
Pos.	Rider	Team	MSR	ToF	ROU	LBL	AGR	CSS	LEE	SUI	TOU	LOM	Pts.
?	Gianni Bugno (ITA)	Team Polti–Vaporetto	0	50	?	0	0	8	0	5	?	?	63
?	Vladislav Bobrik (RUS)	Gewiss–Ballan	?	?	?	?	?	0	?	0	0	50	50
?	Erik Zabel (GER)	Team Telekom	0	0	?	?	?	?	?	?	50	?	50
?	Armand de Las Cuevas (FRA)	Castorama	0	?	?	0	?	50	DNS	?	?	?	50
?	Evgeni Berzin (RUS)	Gewiss–Ballan	0	?	?	50	?	0	?	?	?	?	50

Key
Colour	Result
Gold	Winner
Silver	2nd place
Bronze	3rd place
Green	Top ten position
Blue	Other points position
Purple	Out of points, retired
Red	Did not start (DNS)
White	unclear if retired or DNS

=== Teams ===
Place	Team	Points
1	GB–MG Maglificio	89
2	Motorola	53
3	Gewiss–Ballan	51
4	Mapei–CLAS	45
5	TVM–Bison Kit	41
