= 1994 Leeds International Classic =

Road cycling race

1994 UCI Road World Cup

Race details
- Dates: 14 August 1994
- Stages: 1
- Distance: 231 km (143.5 mi)
- Winning time: 6h 03' 29"

Results
	Winner	Gianluca Bortolami (ITA)	(GB–MG Maglificio)
	Second	Viatcheslav Ekimov (RUS)	(WordPerfect–Colnago–Decca)
	Third	Bo Hamburger (DEN)	(TVM–Bison Kit)

The 1994 Leeds International Classic was the 6th edition of the Leeds International Classic cycle race (also known as Wincanton Classic and Rochester International Classic) and was held on 14 August. The race took place in and around Leeds. The race was won by Gianluca Bortolami of the Mapei–CLAS team.

== Results ==
	Rider	Team	Time
1	Gianluca Bortolami (ITA)	Mapei–CLAS	6h 03' 29"
2	Viatcheslav Ekimov (RUS)	WordPerfect–Colnago–Decca	s.t.
3	Bo Hamburger (DEN)	TVM–Bison Kit	+ 11"
4	Frankie Andreu (USA)	Motorola	s.t.
5	Laurent Dufaux (SUI)	ONCE	s.t.
6	Massimo Ghirotto (ITA)	ZG Mobili	s.t.
7	Max Sciandri (ITA)	GB–MG Maglificio	s.t.
8	Gianni Faresin (ITA)	Lampre–Panaria	s.t.
9	Stephen Swart (NZL)	Motorola	s.t.
10	Flavio Vanzella (ITA)	GB–MG Maglificio	+15"
