= Clarence Knickman =

American cyclist

"Roy" Knickman
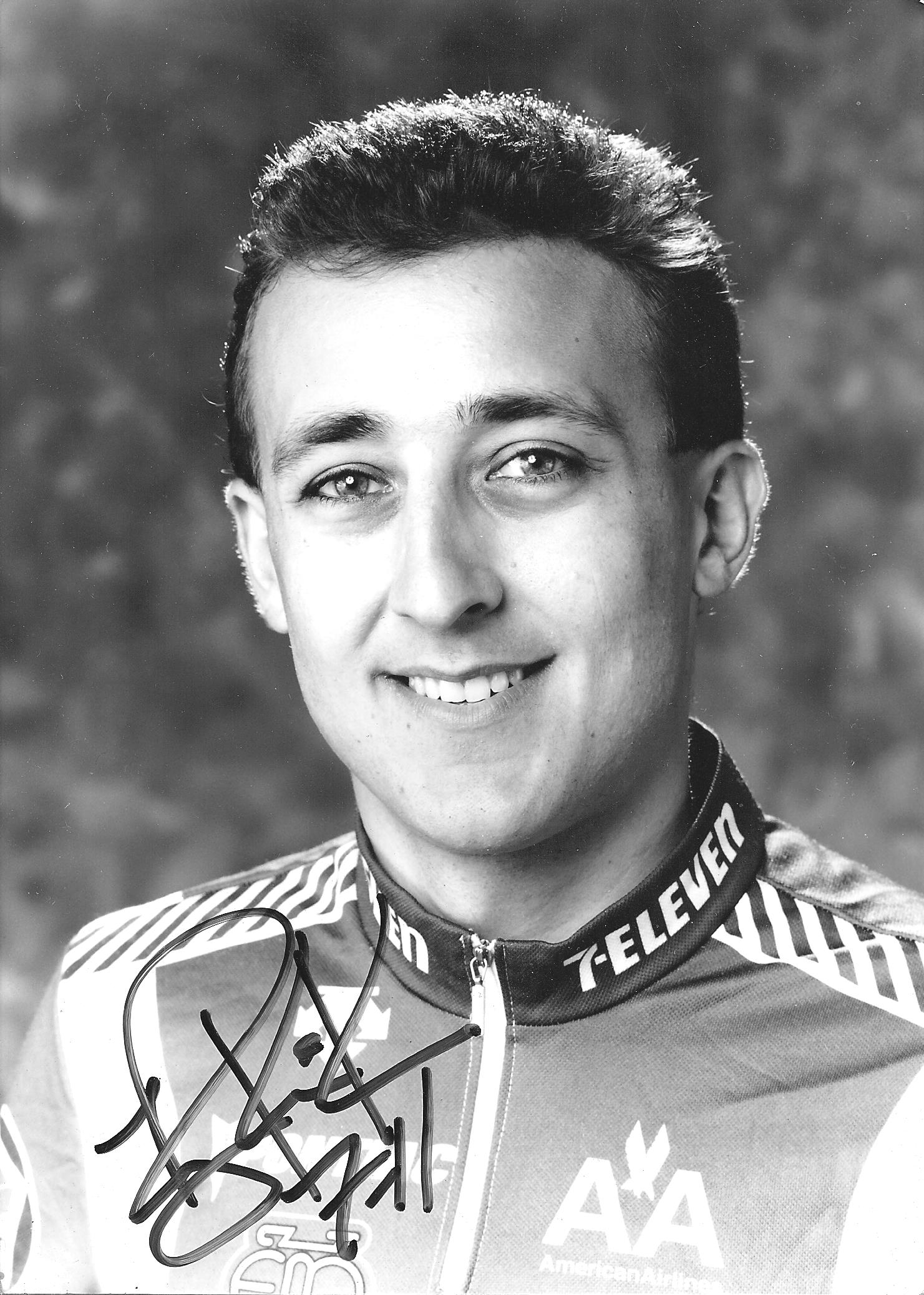
- Knickman's official 7-Eleven team photo from 1989

Personal information
- Full name: Clarence Knickman
- Nickname: Roy
- Born: June 23, 1965 (age 61) Jamaica, New York

Cycling career
- Sport: Cycling
- Current team: Retired
- Role: Rider

Amateur teams
- 1981: North Hollywood Wheelmen
- 1982: SBBC-Centurian
- 1983–1984: Levi-Raleigh
- 1985: Levi-Isuzu

Professional teams
- 1986–1987: La Vie Claire
- 1988–1989: 7-Eleven
- 1991–1993: Coors Light
- 1998–2000: Mercury Cycling Team
Medal record
Men's road bicycle racing
Representing the United States
Olympic Games
Bronze medal – third place	1984 Los Angeles	Team time trial

Clarence "Roy" Knickman (born June 23, 1965) is a former professional road bicycle racer from the United States, who won the bronze medal in the Men's Team Time Trial at the 1984 Summer Olympics. His teammates in Los Angeles, California were Ron Kiefel, Andrew Weaver, and Davis Phinney.

Knickman rode in the 1988 and 1989 Tour de France for Team 7 Eleven. He memorably featured in one of the greatest breakaways in the history of Paris–Roubaix in 1988.

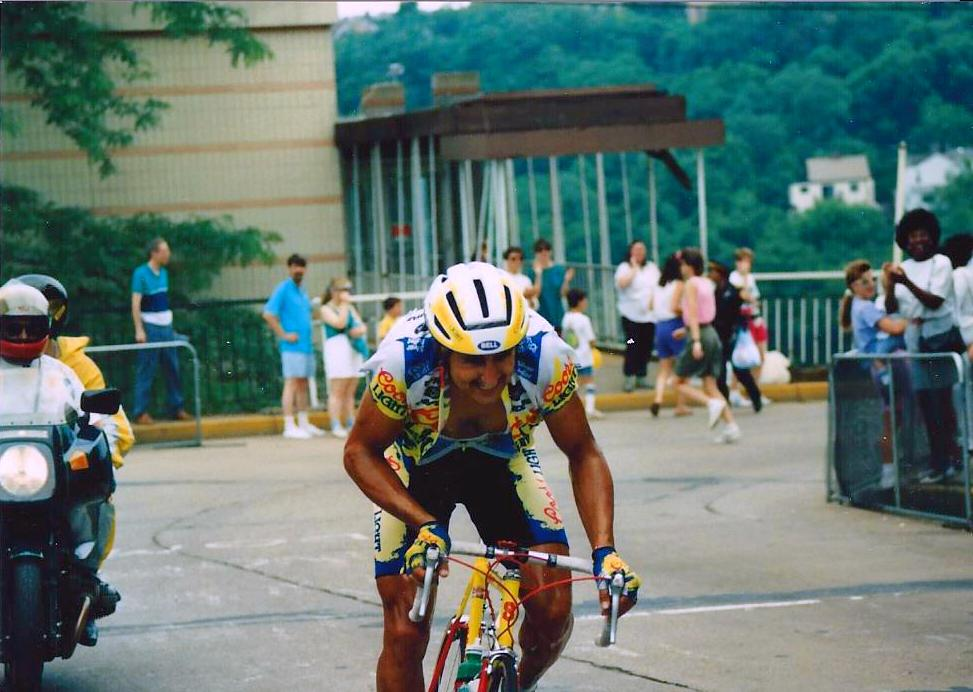
Knickman in 1991 Thrift Drug Classic

During his professional career, Knickman rode for the famous teams of La Vie Claire (alongside Greg LeMond, Bernard Hinault and Andrew Hampsten), Toshiba-Look and 7-Eleven.

He originally retired from competition at the end of 1993 to take up coaching, serving as coach of the US national junior team in 1994 and the US national and Olympic road team from 1995 to 1997. However he returned to riding with the Mercury team in 1998, combining it with the role of Assistant Manager until 2000. He subsequently worked in management for the Autotrader.com and Prime Alliance teams. More recently he has coached cyclists Kendall Ryan, Alexis Ryan, Magnus Sheffield and Quinn Simmons.

He later became a firefighter in Paso Robles, California.

He married Ryan Kelly on July 31, 2021, in St. Paul, MN. He had two children.

== Major results ==
1981
1st Criterium National Road Championships
1st Overall Super Week Juniors

1st Stage 1

1st UCSD Criterium
1982
1st National Championship, Cyclo-cross, Elite, USA
1st National Championship, Road, Juniors, USA
1st National Championship, Time trial, Juniors, USA
1st National Championship, Criterium, Juniors, USA
2nd National Championship, Track, Pursuit, Juniors, USA
1983
1st National Championship, Road, Juniors, USA
1st National Championship, Time trial, Juniors, USA
1st National Championship, Criterium, Juniors, USA
1st National Championship, Track, Points race, Juniors, USA
1st National Championship, Track, Pursuit, Juniors, USA
1st Overall Vosleur Jugend Tour

1st Stage 2

3rd World Championship, Road, 75 km TTT Juniors
2nd Team Pursuit, World Juniors Track Cycling Championships
3rd Pursuit, World Juniors Track Cycling Championships
1984
1st Overall Commonwealth Bank Cycling Classic

1st Stage 2

1st National Championship, Team time trial, USA
2nd National Championship, Cyclo-cross, Elite, USA
3rd Olympic Games, Road, TTT
1985
1st Overall Vuelta de Bisbee

1st Stage 2

1st Overall Vulcan Tour

1st Stage 3

1st Mammoth Classic
1st Stage 3 United Texas Tour
1st Stage 2 Tour of Berlin
1st Overall Whisky Creek Stage Race

1st Stage 4

2nd Overall Milk Race

1st Under 23

1986
1st Overall Washington Trust Cycling Classic

1st Stage 3

3rd Overall Vancouver Coors Pacific

1st Stage 1

3rd Overall Rocky Mountains Classic
1987
1st Stage 8 Critérium du Dauphiné
1st Stage 8 Tour du Suisse
1st Mammoth Classic
1st Overall Whisky Creek Stage Race

1st Stage 1

1st Mulholland Classic
1st A to Z Cycling Classic

Stage 3

2nd National Championship, Road, Elite, USA
2nd Overall Vuelta de Bisbee

1st Stage 2

1988
1st Stage 4 Coors Classic
1st Stage 4 Tour of Florida
1st Overall Monterey Stage Race

1st Stages 1 & 2

1989
1st Stage 2 United Texas Tour
1st Stage 3 Killington Stage Race
1st Stage 4 Coors Classic
1991
1st Overall Killington Stage Race
1st Dole Citrus Classic
1st Tempe Grand Prix
1st Stage 3 Victoria Stage Race
1st Procter & Gamble Classic
1992
1st Hotter-N-Hell Criterium
2nd Overall La Vuelta de Bisbee
1993
1st Hotter-N-Hell Road Race
1998
1st Fitchburg Cycling Classic
1st Stage 1 Tour of Willamette
1st Stage 2 Three Days of Redding
1st Fort Morgan Criterium
1999
1st Stage 2 Dayton Cycling Classic
1st Stage 4 Heart of it All Stage Race
1st Extreme Criterium
2000
1st Boulevarde Road Race
1st Merced Criterium
