= Ron Hayman =

Canadian cyclist (born 1954)

Personal information
- Born: August 31, 1954 (age 72) Montreal, Quebec, Canada

Cycling career
- Sport: Cycling

Professional teams
- 1979: Safir-Ludo-St Louis
- 1980: Panasonic-Shimano
- 1981: 7-Eleven
- 1981: Safir-Gali-Ludo
- 1982: 7 Eleven-Descente
- 1983: 7-Eleven (Individual Sponsor)
- 1984: Mengoni
- 1984: Gianni Motta - Linea M.D. Italia
- 1985: 7 Eleven (Levis-Raleigh)
- 1986: Levi's-Look
- 1987: Varsity Cycles

Ron Hayman (born August 31, 1954) is a former Canadian cyclist who was one of the first Canadian cyclists to turn professional, inspiring those following, like fellow Canadian Alex Stieda. Hayman later became a Canadian cycling coach and entrepreneur, and was runner-up on the list of the 10 most important Canadian cyclists of the twentieth century.

Hayman competed on the Canadian Olympic cycling team in Munich in the 1972 Summer Olympics in the pursuit and again in 1976 Summer Olympics in the team pursuit. He was seven times Canadian national champion on the road and track. In 1979, still an amateur on an English team 'London Australia' (Archer Road Club), he won the 1979 Tour of Ireland. Phil Anderson, Stephen Roche and Robert Millar finished 2nd, 3rd and 4th behind Hayman, and all subsequently became successful professionals. Hayman was ranked top amateur in Belgium (1979).

He raced as a professional from 1979 through 1988. His best-known team, of which he was one of seven founding members, was the Schwinn 7-Eleven Cycling Team that also featured Eric Heiden, Davis Phinney, and later Alex Stieda.

Hayman won the $71,000 pro-am Great Mohawk Bicycle Race in 1981, the richest purse for a professional race in North America at the time, he was the overall winner for the Tour of Minnesota stage race in 1984, and gained a stage win and second at the Redlands Bicycle Classic in 1985. He also won three straight Gastown Grand Prix (1981,1982,1983), a criterium race in Vancouver, won by riders like Stieda (1980), Chris Carmichael (1985) and Lance Armstrong (1991). In 1980, Hayman won the Coors Classic—for many years, the largest stage race in North America.

Hayman's most dramatic win was his sprint victory over the Italian sprinter, Silvestro Milani of Bottecchia, in Washington D.C in the final stage of the 1983 Tour of America, the only stage not won by a European. Hayman was 7–11 team captain. Later that summer, Davis Phinney narrowly beat Steve Bauer at the USPRO criterium championship racing against European professional teams. These wins foreshadowed the end of the European dominance of professional cycle racing.
