= 1994 Züri-Metzgete =

1994 UCI Road World Cup

Race details
- Dates: 20 August 1994
- Stages: 1
- Distance: 243.6 km (151.4 mi)
- Winning time: 6h 14' 11"

Results
	Winner	Gianluca Bortolami (ITA)	(Mapei–CLAS)
	Second	Johan Museeuw (BEL)	(GB–MG Maglificio)
	Third	Maurizio Fondriest (ITA)	(Lampre–Panaria)

The 1994 Züri-Metzgete was the 79th edition of the Züri-Metzgete road cycling one day race. It was held on 20 August 1994 as part of the 1994 UCI Road World Cup. The race took place between the cities of Basel and Zürich was won by Gianluca Bortolami of Italy.

== Result ==
Rank	Rider	Team	Time
1	Gianluca Bortolami (ITA)	Mapei–CLAS	6h 14' 11"
2	Johan Museeuw (BEL)	GB–MG Maglificio	s.t.
3	Maurizio Fondriest (ITA)	Lampre–Panaria	s.t.
4	Claudio Chiappucci (ITA)	Carrera Jeans–Tassoni	s.t.
5	Bjarne Riis (DEN)	Gewiss–Ballan	s.t.
6	Felice Puttini (SUI)	Brescialat–Ceramiche Refin	s.t.
7	Pascal Richard (SUI)	GB–MG Maglificio	s.t.
8	Giorgio Furlan (ITA)	Gewiss–Ballan	s.t.
9	Lance Armstrong (USA)	Motorola	s.t.
10	Francesco Casagrande (ITA)	Mercatone Uno–Medeghini	s.t.
