= 1994 Tour de Romandie =

Race details
- Dates: 3–8 May 1994
- Stages: 5 + Prologue
- Distance: 819.2 km (509.0 mi)
- Winning time: 22h 21' 37"

Results
	Winner	Pascal Richard (SUI)	(GB–MG Maglificio)
	Second	Armand de Las Cuevas (FRA)	(Castorama)
	Third	Andrew Hampsten (USA)	(Motorola)

The 1994 Tour de Romandie was the 48th edition of the Tour de Romandie cycle race and was held from 3 May to 8 May 1994. The race started in Marin and finished in Geneva. The race was won by Pascal Richard of the GB–MG Maglificio team.

== General classification ==
Final general classification
Rank	Rider	Team	Time
1	Pascal Richard (SUI)	GB–MG Maglificio	22h 21' 37"
2	Armand de Las Cuevas (FRA)	Castorama	+ 1' 42"
3	Andrew Hampsten (USA)	Motorola	+ 2' 53"
4	Marco Giovannetti (ITA)	Mapei–CLAS	+ 3' 34"
5	Marco Saligari (ITA)	GB–MG Maglificio	+ 3' 53"
6	Davide Rebellin (ITA)	GB–MG Maglificio	+ 4' 26"
7	Stefano Della Santa (ITA)	Mapei–CLAS	+ 4' 26"
8	Pavel Tonkov (RUS)	Lampre–Panaria	+ 5' 45"
9	Gianni Faresin (ITA)	Lampre–Panaria	+ 6' 13"
10	Ivan Gotti (ITA)	Team Polti–Vaporetto	+ 6' 29"
