= 1994 Clásica de San Sebastián =

Race details
- Dates: 6 August 1994
- Stages: 1
- Distance: 238 km (147.9 mi)
- Winning time: 5h 24' 44"

Results
	Winner	Armand de Las Cuevas (FRA)	(Castorama)
	Second	Lance Armstrong (USA)	(Motorola)
	Third	Stefano Della Santa (ITA)	(Mapei–CLAS)

The 1994 Clásica de San Sebastián was the 14th edition of the Clásica de San Sebastián cycle race and was held on 6 August 1994. The race started and finished in San Sebastián. The race was won by Armand de Las Cuevas of the Castorama team.

== General classification ==
Final general classification

Rank	Rider	Team	Time
1	Armand de Las Cuevas (FRA)	Castorama	5h 24' 44"
2	Lance Armstrong (USA)	Motorola	+ 1' 56"
3	Stefano Della Santa (ITA)	Mapei–CLAS	+ 1' 57"
4	Vladimir Poulnikov (UKR)	Carrera Jeans–Tassoni	+ 2' 03"
5	Andrei Tchmil (MDA)	Lotto	+ 2' 09"
6	Gianluca Bortolami (ITA)	Mapei–CLAS	+ 2' 09"
7	Pello Ruiz Cabestany (ESP)	Euskadi–Petronor	+ 2' 09"
8	José Ramón Uriarte (ESP)	Banesto	+ 2' 09"
9	Ángel Edo (ESP)	Kelme–Avianca–Gios	+ 2' 09"
10	Gianni Bugno (ITA)	Team Polti–Vaporetto	+ 2' 09"
