= 1983 World Juniors Track Cycling Championships =

- Venue: Whanganui, New Zealand
- Date: August 1983

The 1983 World Juniors Track Cycling Championships were the ninth annual Junior World Championships for track cycling held in Whanganui, New Zealand in August 1983.

The Championships had five events for men only: Sprint, Points race, Individual pursuit, Team pursuit and 1 kilometre time trial.

== Events ==
Event	Gold	Silver	Bronze
Men's Events
Sprint	Takashi Seiko; Japan	Nikolai Kovch; Soviet Union	René Gullach; Denmark
Points race	Andreas Kappes; Germany	Dean Woods; Australia	Robert Muzio; United Kingdom
Individual pursuit	Dean Woods; Australia	Mikhail Svechnikov; Soviet Union	Roy Knickman; United States
Team pursuit	Kenneth Røpke; Mark Kubach; Lars Otto Olsen; Klaus Kynde; Denmark	Tim Hinz; Craig Alan Schommer; Roy Knickman; Kit Kyle; United States	Walter Zini; Gianni Bortolazzo; Stefano Boschini; Orlando Gordini; Italy
Time trial	Alan Miller; New Zealand	Kenneth Røpke; Denmark	Chr Huber; France

== Medal table ==
* Host nation (New Zealand)

Rank	Nation	Gold	Silver	Bronze	Total
1	Denmark (DEN)	1	1	1	3
2	Australia (AUS)	1	1	0	2
3	Germany (GER)	1	0	0	1
3	Japan (JPN)	1	0	0	1
3	New Zealand (NZL)*	1	0	0	1
6	Soviet Union (URS)	0	2	0	2
7	United States (USA)	0	1	1	2
8	France (FRA)	0	0	1	1
8	Great Britain (GBR)	0	0	1	1
8	Italy (ITA)	0	0	1	1
Totals (10 entries)		5	5	5	15
