= 1992 Tour de Romandie =

Race details
- Dates: 5–10 May 1992
- Stages: 5 + Prologue
- Distance: 865.4 km (537.7 mi)
- Winning time: 22h 50' 33"

Results
	Winner	Andrew Hampsten (USA)	(Motorola)
	Second	Miguel Induráin (ESP)	(Banesto)
	Third	Charly Mottet (FRA)	(RMO)

The 1992 Tour de Romandie was the 46th edition of the Tour de Romandie cycle race and was held from 5 May to 10 May 1992. The race started in Fribourg and finished in Geneva. The race was won by Andrew Hampsten of the Motorola team.

== General classification ==
Final general classification
Rank	Rider	Team	Time
1	Andrew Hampsten (USA)	Motorola	22h 50' 33"
2	Miguel Induráin (ESP)	Banesto	+ 23"
3	Charly Mottet (FRA)	RMO	+ 39"
4	Armand de Las Cuevas (FRA)	Banesto	+ 1' 00"
5	Luc Leblanc (FRA)	Castorama	+ 1' 13"
6	Laurent Dufaux (SUI)	Helvetia–Fichtel & Sachs	+ 1' 31"
7	Massimiliano Lelli (ITA)	Ariostea	+ 2' 14"
8	Jean-Claude Leclercq (FRA)	Helvetia–Fichtel & Sachs	+ 2' 35"
9	Zenon Jaskuła (POL)	GB–MG Maglificio	+ 3' 11"
10	Éric Caritoux (FRA)	RMO	+ 3' 14"
