= 2003 Three Days of De Panne =

Race details
- Dates: 1 April–3 April 2003
- Stages: 3
- Distance: 548 km (341 mi)
- Winning time: 13h 44' 53"

Results
	Winner	Raivis Belohvoščiks (LAT)
	Second	Gianluca Bortolami (ITA)
	Third	Peter Van Petegem (BEL)

The 2003 Three Days of De Panne was the 27th edition of the Three Days of De Panne cycle race and was held on 1 April to 3 April 2003. The race started in Middelkerke and finished in De Panne. The race was won by Raivis Belohvoščiks.

== General classification ==
Final general classification

Rank	Rider	Time
1	Raivis Belohvoščiks (LAT)	13h 44' 53"
2	Gianluca Bortolami (ITA)	+ 1"
3	Peter Van Petegem (BEL)	+ 13"
4	Olaf Pollack (GER)	+ 14"
5	Viatcheslav Ekimov (RUS)	+ 17"
6	Nico Mattan (BEL)	+ 20"
7	Christophe Mengin (FRA)	+ 22"
8	Fabian Cancellara (SUI)	+ 25"
9	Serhiy Honchar (UKR)	+ 28"
10	Marc Wauters (BEL)	+ 30"
