= 1997 Volta a la Comunitat Valenciana =

Race details
- Dates: 25 February–1 March 1997
- Stages: 5
- Winning time: 20h 42' 44"

Results
	Winner	Juan Carlos Domínguez (ESP)	(Kelme–Costa Blanca)
	Second	Armand de Las Cuevas (FRA)	(Banesto)
	Third	Christophe Moreau (FRA)	(Festina–Lotus)

The 1997 Volta a la Comunitat Valenciana was the 55th edition of the Volta a la Comunitat Valenciana road cycling stage race, which was held from 25 February to 1 March 1997. The race started in Elche and finished in Valencia. The race was won by Juan Carlos Domínguez of the Kelme–Costa Blanca team.

== General classification ==
Final general classification

Rank	Rider	Team	Time
1	Juan Carlos Domínguez (ESP)	Kelme–Costa Blanca	20h 42' 44"
2	Armand de Las Cuevas (FRA)	Banesto	+ 24"
3	Christophe Moreau (FRA)	Festina–Lotus	+ 26"
4	Vítor Gamito (POR)	Estepona en Marcha–Cafés Toscaf	+ 32"
5	Viatcheslav Ekimov (RUS)	U.S. Postal Service	+ 41"
6	Pascal Chanteur (FRA)	Casino	+ 45"
7	Michael Andersson (SWE)	TVM–Farm Frites	+ 46"
8	Didier Rous (FRA)	Festina–Lotus	+ 52"
9	Roberto Petito (ITA)	Saeco–Estro	+ 53"
10	Francesco Casagrande (ITA)	Saeco–Estro	+ 1' 03"
