= 1986 Tour de Suisse =

Race details
- Dates: 10–20 June 1986
- Stages: 10 + Prologue
- Distance: 1,802.1 km (1,120 mi)
- Winning time: 48h 24' 12"

Results
	Winner	Andrew Hampsten (USA)	(La Vie Claire)
	Second	Robert Millar (GBR)	(Panasonic–Merckx–Agu)
	Third	Greg LeMond (USA)	(La Vie Claire)
	Points	Greg LeMond (USA)	(La Vie Claire)
	Mountains	Erik Breukink (NED)	(Panasonic–Merckx–Agu)
	Combination	Greg LeMond (USA)	(La Vie Claire)
	Team	La Vie Claire	

The 1986 Tour de Suisse was the 50th edition of the Tour de Suisse cycle race and was held from 10 June to 29 June 1986. The race started in Winterthur and finished in Zürich. The race was won by Andrew Hampsten of the La Vie Claire team.

== General classification ==
Final general classification

Rank	Rider	Team	Time
1	Andrew Hampsten (USA)	La Vie Claire	48h 24' 12"
2	Robert Millar (GBR)	Panasonic–Merckx–Agu	+ 53"
3	Greg LeMond (USA)	La Vie Claire	+ 1' 21"
4	Urs Zimmermann (SUI)	Carrera Jeans–Vagabond	+ 1' 34"
5	Franco Chioccioli (ITA)	Ecoflam–Jollyscarpe–BFB Bruciatori–Alfa Lum	+ 3' 34"
6	Pedro Delgado (ESP)	PDM–Ultima–Concorde	+ 7' 34"
7	Stefan Brykt (SWE)	Sammontana–Bianchi	+ 8' 28"
8	Gottfried Schmutz (SUI)	Cilo–Aufina–Gemeaz Cusin	+ 9' 25"
9	Jean-Claude Leclercq (FRA)	Kas	+ 11' 18"
10	Jörg Muller (SUI)	Kas	+ 12' 00"
