= Ron Kiefel =

American cyclist (born 1960)

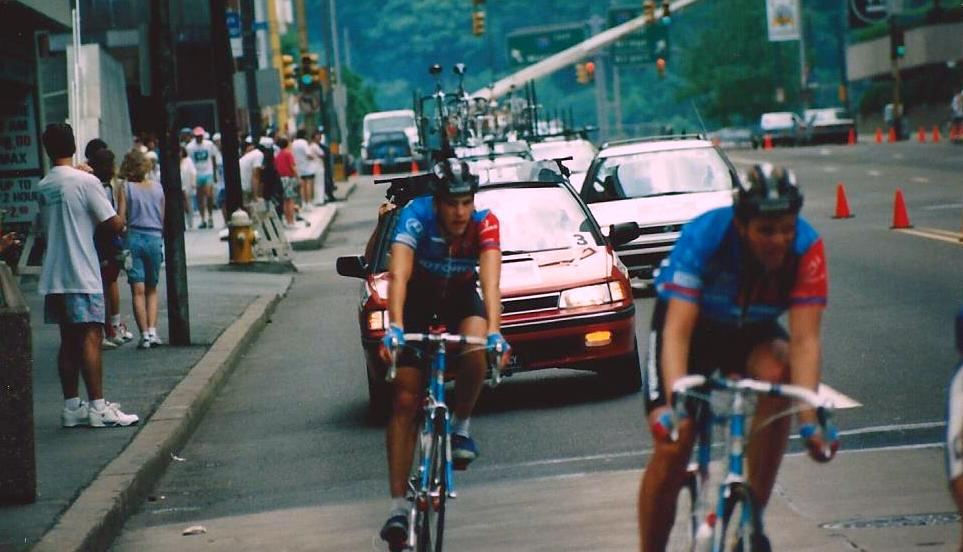
- Kiefel and Frankie Andreu (r-l) racing 1991 Thrift Drug Classic for Motorola

Personal information
- Full name: Ronald Alexander Kiefel
- Nickname: Wookie
- Born: April 11, 1960 (age 66) Denver, Colorado, U.S.

Cycling career
- Sport: Cycling
- Current team: Retired
- Discipline: Road
- Role: Rider
- Rider type: All-rounder

Professional teams
- 1985–1990: 7-Eleven
- 1991–1992: Motorola
- 1993–1994: Coors Light
- 1995: Saturn

Major wins
- Grand Tours Giro d'Italia 1 individual stage (1985) Stage races Tour de Luxembourg 1 individual stage (1992) Tour DuPont 1 individual stage (1992) One-day races and Classics Trofeo Laigueglia (1985) Giro di Toscana (1988)
Medal record
Men's road bicycle racing
Representing the United States
Olympic Games
Bronze medal – third place	1984 Los Angeles	Team Time Trial

Ronald Alexander Kiefel (born April 11, 1960) is a former professional road bicycle racer from the United States. Kiefel is a seven-time Tour de France racer, Olympic bronze medalist and member of the United States Bicycling Hall of Fame.

Kiefel rode for American professional teams such as 7-Eleven, Motorola, Coors Light and Saturn. His wins included the 1985 Trofeo Laigueglia and the 1987 Tour of Tuscany.

He became the first American stage winner in a Grand Tour when he won stage 15 (from L'Aquila to Perugia) in the 1985 Giro d'Italia.

He competed in seven Tours de France, and represented the USA at the 1984 Olympic Games, where he won bronze in the team time trial with Roy Knickman, Davis Phinney, and Andy Weaver.

In 1983 Kiefel won the USPRO road championship, the time trial and the team time trial. He was also road champion in 1988. He retired from racing in 1996 and has since commentated on TV and radio for European classics and tours. He is a coach in Wheat Ridge, Colorado, former vice president of Wheat Ridge Cyclery, and promotes races and rides.

In 2004, Kiefel was inducted in the United States Bicycling Hall of Fame. He and his wife, Meegan, at one time hosted a weekly AM radio show.

== Major results ==
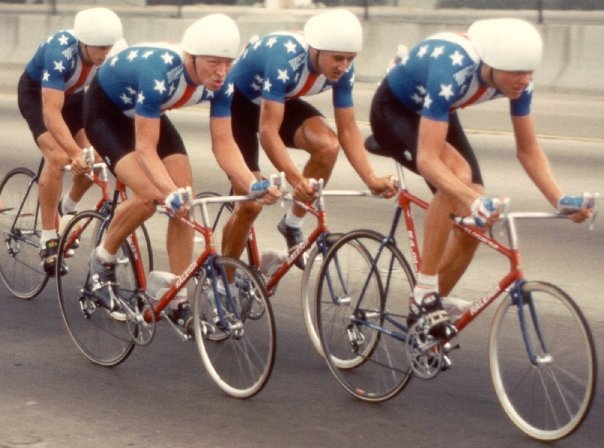
Ron Kiefel in 100 km team trial race in 1984 Olympics (far right)

- 3rd Team time trial, UCI Junior Road World Championships (1978)
- National Road Race Champion (1983, 1988)
- United States National Time Trial Champion (1983)
- United States National Team Time Trial Champion (1983)
- 3rd Summer Olympics – Men's Team Time Trial (1984)

=== Year by year ===
1978

- 3rd Team time trial, UCI Junior Road World Championships

1980

- 5th, U.S. National Cyclocross Championships

1981

- 5th, U.S. National Cyclocross Championships

1983

- 1st, U.S. National Cycling Championships – Road Race
- 1st, U.S. National Cycling Championships – Individual Time Trial
- 1st, U.S. National Cycling Championships – Team Time Trial

1984

- 3rd, Los Angeles Summer Olympics – Men's Team Time Trial
- 9th, Los Angeles Summer Olympics – Men's Individual Road Race

1985

- 1st, Trofeo Laigueglia (ITA)
- 1st, Stage 15, Giro d'Italia (ITA)
- 1st, Prologue, Coors Classic (USA)

1986

- 1st, Prologue, Coors Classic (USA)
- 1st, Stage 13, Coors Classic (USA)

1987

- 1st, Los Gatos Cat's Hill Classic (USA)

1988

- 1st, Overall, Tour of Tuscany (ITA)
- 1st, U.S. National Cycling Championships – Road Race
- 1st, Stage 12, Coors Classic (USA)

1989

- 1st, Stage 10, Tour de Trump (USA)
- 6th, Overall, Tour de Trump (USA)

1990

- 1st, Stage 1, Critérium International (FR)
- 2nd, Stage 10, Tour de Trump (USA)
- 3rd, Stage 8, Tour de France

1992

- 1st, Stage 1, Tour de Luxembourg (LU)

1993

- 1st, Stage 7, Tour DuPont (USA)
- 1st, Los Gatos Cat's Hill Classic (USA)

1994

- 1st, Overall, CoreStates New Jersey National Bank Classic (USA)

=== Grand Tour general classification results timeline ===
Grand Tour	1985	1986	1987	1988	1989	1990	1991	1992
Tour de France	—	96	82	69	73	83	138	DNF
Giro d'Italia	60	—	—	62	102	—	138	—
