= Andrew Weaver (cyclist) =

American bicycle racer and architect

Personal information
- Born: February 12, 1959 (age 67) Columbus, Ohio, U.S.

Cycling career
- Sport: Cycling
Medal record
Men's cycling
Representing United States
Olympic Games
Bronze medal – third place	1984 Los Angeles	Team time trial

Andrew Teisher Weaver (born February 12, 1959) is a former professional road bicycle racer from the United States, who won the bronze medal in the team time trial at the 1984 Summer Olympics. His winning teammates in Los Angeles, California were Ron Kiefel, Clarence Knickman, and Davis Phinney. Weaver was also a member of the 1979 Pan American Games US team and won a gold medal at the 1983 Pan American Games. He is a nine-time National Cycling Champion.

Andrew Weaver received a bachelor's degree in architecture from the University of Florida and a master's degree in architecture from the Massachusetts Institute of Technology.

Weaver is a practicing architect and established Weaver+Associates Architects in 1994. He is a Registered Architect in Massachusetts, Rhode Island, Connecticut, New York, New Jersey, New Hampshire and Maine specializing in resort/golf-related projects, private institutional, sports and multi-family projects.

== See also ==
- List of University of Florida alumni
- List of University of Florida Olympians
