= Gianluca Bortolami =

Italian cyclist

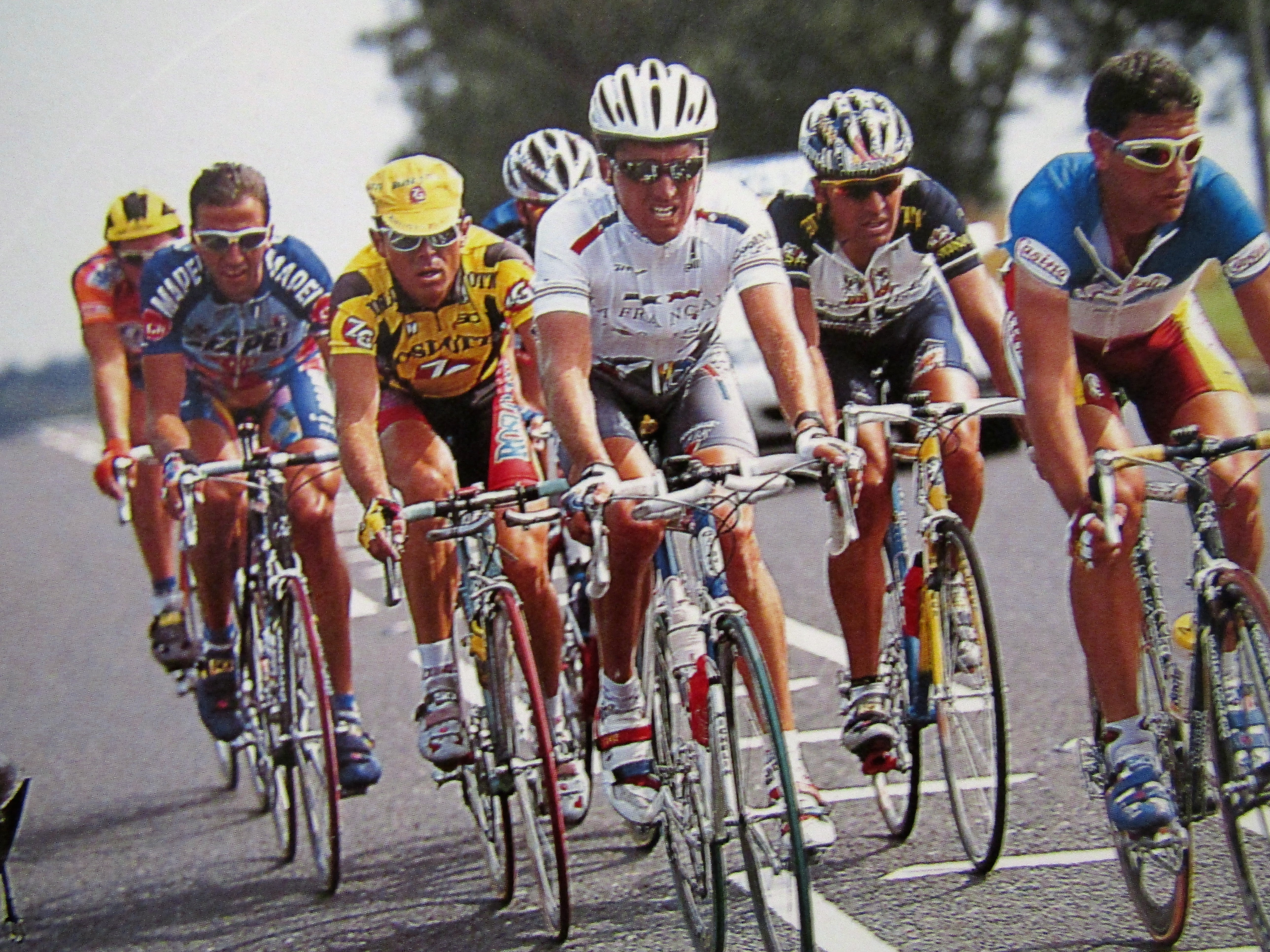

Personal information
- Full name: Gianluca Bortolami
- Born: 28 August 1968 (age 58) Locate di Triulzi, Italy
- Height: 1.80 m (5 ft 11 in)
- Weight: 74 kg (163 lb; 11 st 9 lb)

Cycling career
- Sport: Cycling
- Discipline: Road
- Role: Rider

Professional teams
- 1990–1993: Diana–Colnago–Animex
- 1994–1996: Mapei–CLAS
- 1997–1998: Festina–Lotus
- 1999–2003: Vini Caldirola
- 2004–2005: Lampre

Major wins
- Grand Tours Tour de France 1 individual stage (1994) One-Day Races and Classics Tour of Flanders (2001) Wincanton Classic (1994) Züri-Metzgete (1994) Giro del Piemonte (1997) Grand Prix de Fourmies (2002) Coppa Bernocchi (1997) Other UCI Road World Cup (1994)

Gianluca Bortolami (born 28 August 1968) is an Italian former professional road racing cyclist. Bortolami's greatest feats was capturing the monumental classic Tour of Flanders in 2001 and winning the 1994 UCI Road World Cup season championship.

Bortolami was born in Locate di Triulzi, province of Milan. He competed in the road race at the 1988 Summer Olympics. He turned professional in 1990 and rode for Lampre. He finished 75th in the 2002 Tour de France, 46th in the 1997 Tour, 13th in the 1994 Tour with one stage win, and 73rd in the 1993 Tour. He was tested positive for cortisone in 2003 during Three Days of De Panne. He was suspended for six months by the Italian cycling federation.

== Major results ==
1990
1st Stage 5 Tour of Britain
1991
1st Stage 4a Tour of Britain
1992
Volta a Portugal

1st Stages 10 & 11

1st Stage 2 Tour de Romandie
1993
1st Cronostaffeta
6th Milano–Torino
1994
1st UCI Road World Cup
1st Giro del Veneto
1st Gran Premio Città di Camaiore
1st Leeds International Classic
1st Züri-Metzgete
1st Stage 7 Tour de France
2nd Paris–Tours
2nd Grand Prix de Fourmies
2nd Trofeo Matteotti
5th E3 Prijs Vlaanderen
7th Brabantse Pijl
1995
1st Prologue Tour DuPont
3rd Overall Three Days of De Panne
3rd Overall Tour de Luxembourg
5th Tour of Flanders
9th Amstel Gold Race
10th Paris–Roubaix
1996
2nd Paris–Roubaix
2nd Nice–Alassio
8th Amstel Gold Race
1997
1st Coppa Bernocchi
1st Giro del Piemonte
1st Trofeo dello Scalatore
2nd Overall Volta a Galega

1st Stage 5

2nd Grand Prix de Fourmies
3rd Rochester International Classic
4th Overall Route du Sud
5th Giro dell'Emilia
1998
1st Gran Premio di Chiasso
2nd Omloop Het Volk
2nd Prueba Villafranca de Ordizia
4th Trofeo Laigueglia
9th Paris–Roubaix
9th Tour of Flanders
1999
Tour of Austria

1st Stages 1 & 2

2000
3rd Giro di Toscana
2001
1st Tour of Flanders
1st Sparkassen Giro Bochum
1st Stage 2 Tour de Suisse
1st Stage 3 Brixia Tour
3rd Tre Valli Varesine
5th Tour du Haut Var
6th Coppa Bernocchi
8th Trofeo Laigueglia
2002
1st Giro della Romagna
1st Grand Prix de Fourmies
1st Gran Premio Bruno Beghelli
1st Milano–Vignola
2nd Coppa Placci
2nd Coppa Bernocchi
3rd Giro del Piemonte
5th Gran Premio Fred Mengoni
7th Giro del Veneto
9th Overall Tour of Qatar
9th Trofeo Melinda
2003
2nd Overall Three Days of De Panne

1st Stage 1

2004
1st Giro della Romagna
6th Gran Premio Bruno Beghelli
7th Overall Tour of Belgium

1st Stage 1

=== Grand Tour general classification results timeline ===
Grand Tour	1990	1991	1992	1993	1994	1995	1996	1997	1998	1999	2000	2001	2002	2003	2004	2005
Giro d'Italia	123	16	64	55	51	—	DNF	34	—	—	96	—	—	—	—	—
Tour de France	—	—	—	73	13	DNF	—	46	—	—	DNF	—	75	—	—	DNF
Vuelta a España	—	—	—	—	—	—	DNF	—	—	—	—	—	—	—	—	—

Legend
—	Did not compete
DNF	Did not finish
