= Alex Stieda =

Canadian cyclist

Alex Stieda, OLY
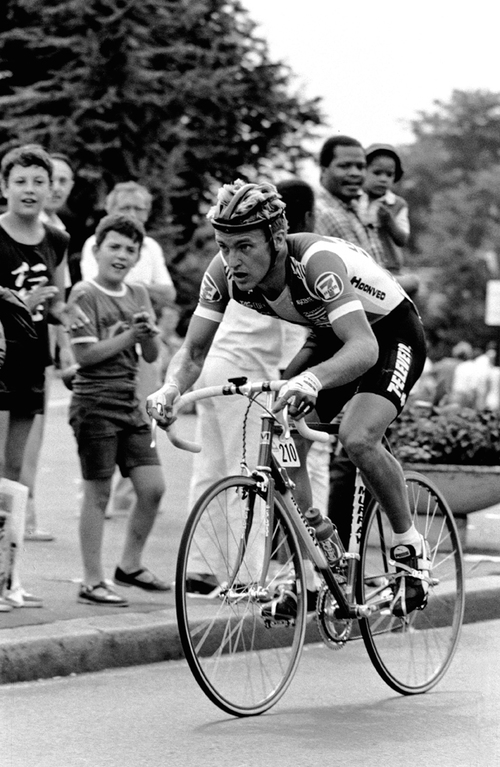
- Stieda at the 1986 Tour de France

Personal information
- Full name: Alexander Nicholas Ernst Stieda
- Born: 13 April 1961 (age 65) Belleville, Ontario, Canada

Cycling career
- Sport: Cycling
- Disciplines: Road, Track
- Role: Rider
- Rider type: Rouleur

Amateur teams
- 1979–1985: Canadian National Team
- 1982–1985: 7-Eleven Amateur Team

Professional teams
- 1986–1990: 7-Eleven
- 1991: Evian–Miko
- 1992: Coors Light
Medal record
Men's track cycling
Representing Canada
Commonwealth Games
Bronze medal – third place	1982 Brisbane	Individual pursuit
Universiade
Bronze medal – third place	1983 Edmonton	Individual pursuit

Alexander Nicholas Ernst Stieda (born 13 April 1961) is a former professional road bicycle racer from Canada. Stieda led five classifications of the Tour de France on the second day of the 1986 Tour de France: the general classification, the mountains classification, the combination classification, the intermediate sprints classification and the young rider classification, becoming the first North American to lead the Tour de France. He finished in 120th place, in his only Tour de France, riding on the 7-Eleven – Hoonved Cycling Team. He also placed bronze in the 1982 Australian Commonwealth Games, and competed at the 1984 Summer Olympics for his native country. At the 1983 Summer Universiade he won the bronze medal in the men's individual pursuit. He also competed in the individual pursuit and points race events at the 1984 Summer Olympics. Alex is the co-founder of the Tour of Alberta professional cycling race.

== Major results ==
1980
1st Overall Tour de l'Abitibi
1st Gastown Grand Prix
1982
3rd Individual pursuit, Commonwealth Games
1983
1st Athens Twilight Criterium
3rd Individual pursuit, Summer Universiade
1984
1st Gastown Grand Prix
1st Stage 3 Tour of Texas
1985
1st Stage 1 Coors Classic
1986
Tour de France

Held after Stage 1

1987
1st Stage 5 Tour of Texas
1988
1st Overall Tour of Texas

1st Stage 1

3rd Overall Coors Classic
1989
1st Overall Tour of Texas

1st Stage 3

1st Canadian Tire Series
7th Overall Tour de Trump
1990
1st Stage 17 International Cycling Classic
1991
1st Overall Montréal Tour

1st Stage 3

1st Stage 2 Tour de White Rock
