= Kenneth Røpke =

Danish cyclist (1965–2026)

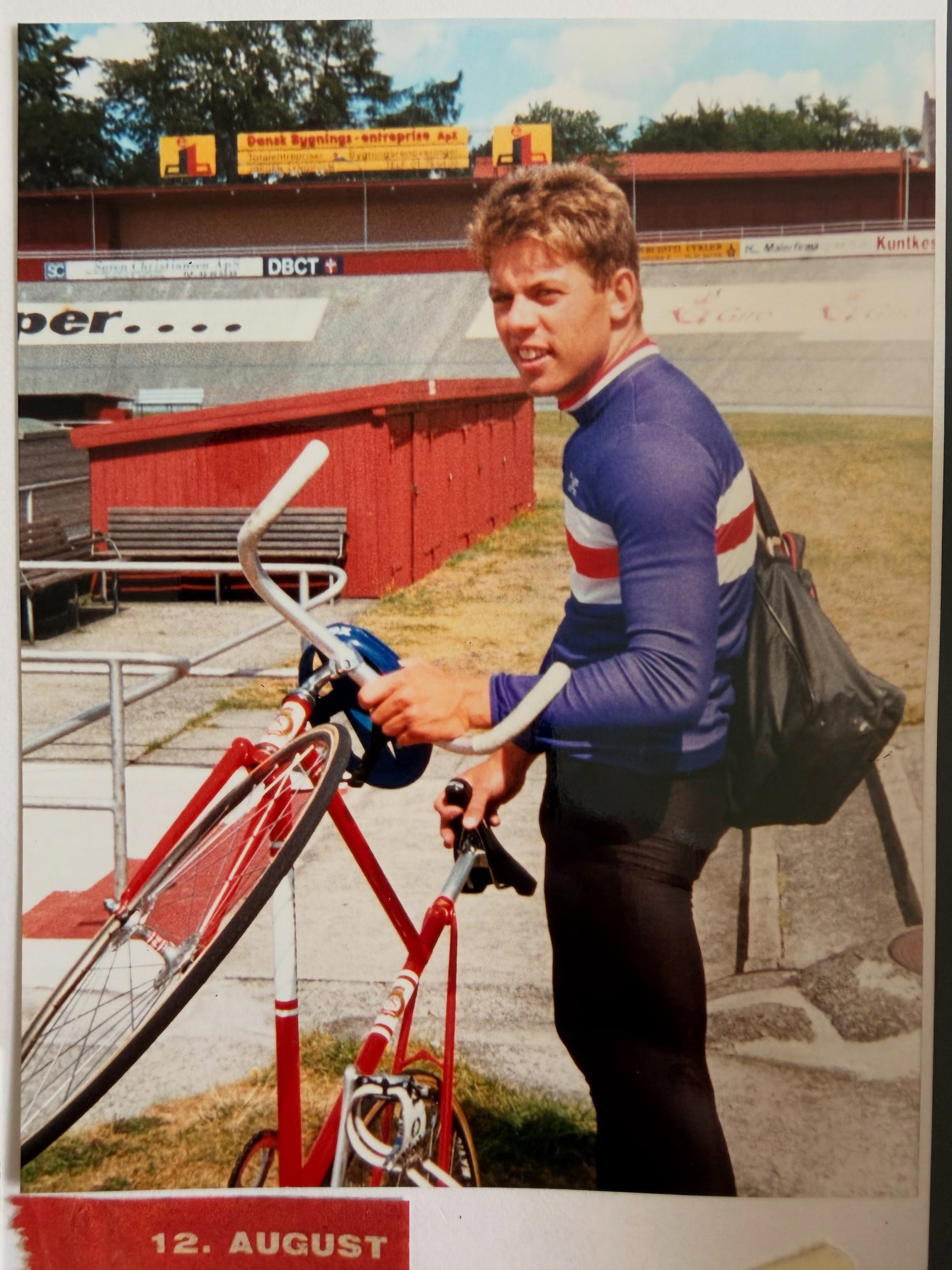

Personal information
- Full name: Kurt Kenneth Røpke
- Born: 17 August 1965 Gentofte, Denmark
- Died: 15 August 2026 (aged 60)

Cycling career
- Sport: Cycling
- Discipline: Track cycling

Kenneth Røpke (17 August 1965 – 15 August 2026) was a Danish cyclist. He finished in 4th place in the 1 km time trial event at the 1988 Summer Olympics.

He started riding in 1979 as a part of the local cycling club CC Gladsaxe and moved to track cycling in 1981.

At the 1982 World Juniors Track Cycling Championships he won a bronze medal in the team pursuit. One year later at the 1983 World Juniors Track Cycling Championships he became a world champion in the team pursuit and won a silver medal in the individual time trial.

He won the national championship in the 1 km time trial from 1984–90, and again in 1993, with second-place finishes in 1991–92 and third in 1983.

In 1994 he retired from professional cycling and acted as the assistant coach with the Danish national track team for a short period.

Røpke died from cardiac arrest on 15 August 2026, two days before his 61st birthday.
