= Armand de Las Cuevas =

French cyclist

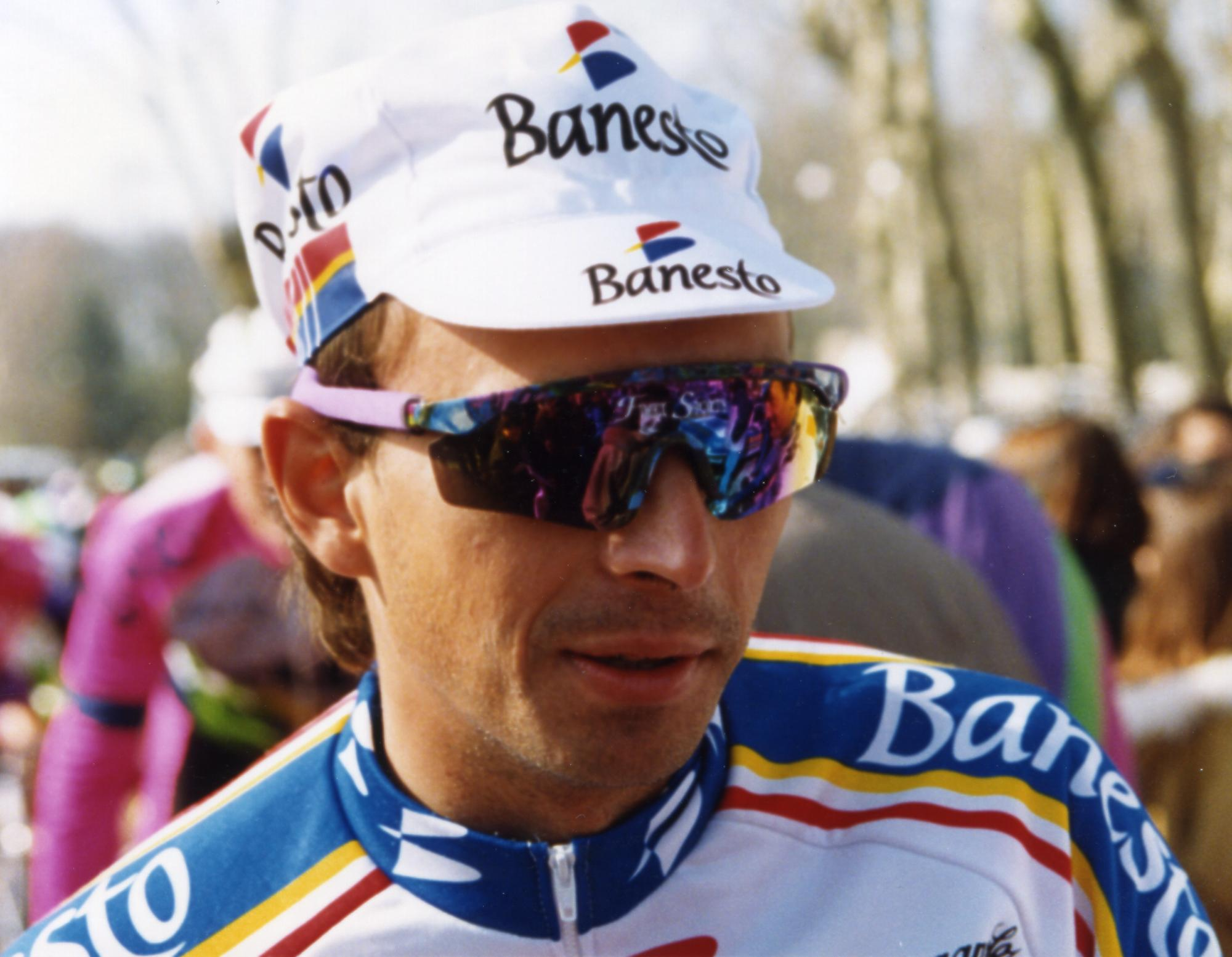
- Las Cuevas at the 1993 Paris–Nice

Personal information
- Full name: Armand de Las Cuevas
- Born: 26 June 1968 Troyes, France
- Died: 2 August 2018 (aged 50) Réunion, France

Cycling career
- Sport: Cycling
- Disciplines: Road; Track
- Role: Rider
- Rider type: Time trialist

Professional teams
- 1989–1993: Reynolds
- 1994–1995: Castorama
- 1996: Petit Casino
- 1997–1998: Banesto
- 1999: Amica Chips–Costa de Almeria

Major wins
- Grand Tours Giro d'Italia 1 individual stage (1994) Stage races Critérium du Dauphiné Libéré (1998) One-day races and Classics National Road Race Championships (1991) Clásica de San Sebastián (1994)
Medal record
Men's track cycling
Representing France
World Championships
Bronze medal – third place	1990 Maebashi	Individual pursuit

Armand de Las Cuevas (26 June 1968 – 2 August 2018) was a French racing cyclist.

De Las Cuevas won races such as the Critérium du Dauphiné Libéré, Clásica de San Sebastián and the (at the time) unofficial time trial world championship, Grand Prix des Nations. A time trial specialist, he won many prologues and individual time trials in the early 1990s. In the 1992 and 1994 Tour de France he finished in the top five of the prologue as well as the other individual time trials (ITT). He won a stage in the 1994 Giro d'Italia, an ITT, and placed in the top five of both other time trials. He was placed ninth in the general classification. In the 1994 Tour de Romandie he won the prologue and finished second overall.

He also competed in track pursuit racing, and was bronze medalist in the discipline at the 1990 UCI Track Cycling World Championships in Japan.

De Las Cuevas retired to Réunion in 1999, where he founded a cycling school.

In 2018, he died by suicide in Réunion.

== Major results ==
1986
1st Overall Tour de Lorraine
1987
3rd Chrono des Herbiers
1988
1st Overall Tour de Bretagne
4th Overall Circuit Cycliste Sarthe
4th Chrono des Herbiers
1990
1st Stage 4 Vuelta a Asturias
3rd Individual pursuit, UCI Track World Championships
1991
1st Road race, National Road Championships
1st GP Ouest–France
1st Stage 3 Bicicleta Vasca
1st Bordeaux–Caudéran
2nd Overall Circuit Cycliste Sarthe
1992
4th Overall Tour de Romandie

1st Prologue

6th Overall Tour de l'Oise
9th Overall Circuit Cycliste Sarthe
1993
1st Overall Étoile de Bessèges

1st Stage 2

1st Grand Prix des Nations
3rd Grand Prix d'Ouverture La Marseillaise
4th Overall Paris–Nice

1st Stage 7

1994
1st Overall Vuelta a Burgos

1st Stage 2

1st Clásica de San Sebastián
1st Paris–Camembert
2nd Overall Tour de Romandie

1st Prologue

2nd GP du canton d'Argovie
5th Road race, National Road Championships
6th Overall Giro del Trentino
6th Overall Critérium International
9th Overall Giro d'Italia

1st Stage 1b (ITT)

1995
1st Trophée des Grimpeurs
5th GP de la Ville de Rennes
10th Overall Critérium International
1996
10th Subida a Urkiola
1997
1st Clásica de Sabiñánigo
2nd Overall Volta a la Comunitat Valenciana
3rd Overall Tour of Galicia
6th Overall Volta a Catalunya
1998
1st Overall Critérium du Dauphiné Libéré
1st Overall Route du Sud

1st Stage 2

9th Overall Volta ao Alentejo

=== Grand Tour general classification results timeline ===
Grand Tour	1992	1993	1994	1995	1996	1997	1998
Giro d'Italia	38	43	9	DNF	—	—	—
Tour de France	DNF	—	DNF	62	—	—	—
Vuelta a España	—	DNF	—	—	DNF	DNF	DNF

Legend
—	Did not compete
DNF	Did not finish
