= Davis Phinney =

American cyclist

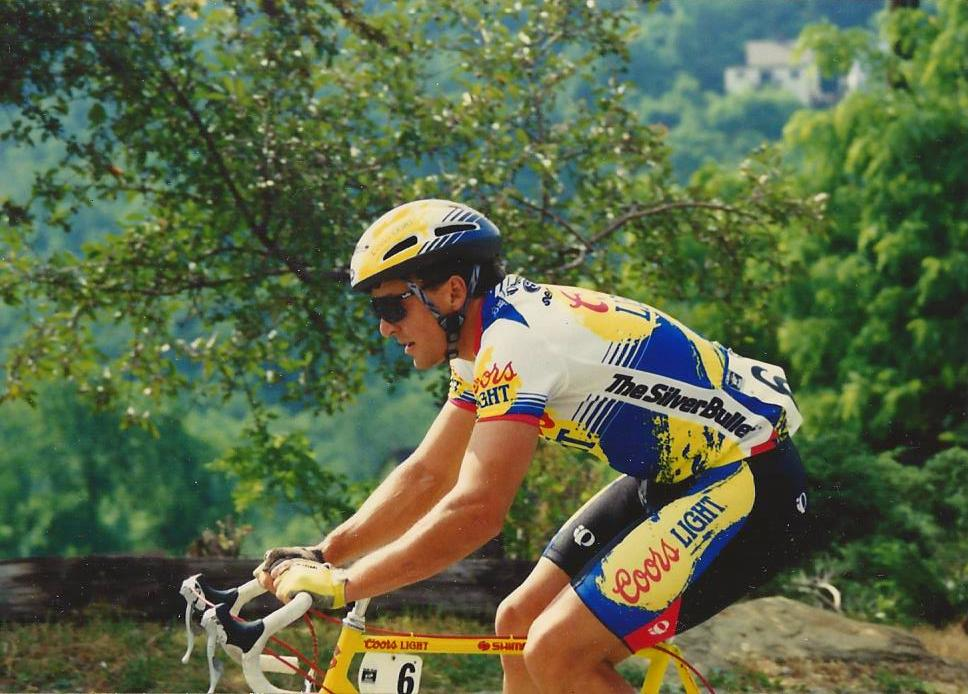
- Phinney in the 1991 Thrift Drug Classic

Personal information
- Full name: Davis Phinney
- Nicknames: "Thor", The Cash Register
- Born: July 10, 1959 (age 67) Boulder, Colorado, U.S.

Cycling career
- Sport: Cycling
- Current team: Retired
- Discipline: Road
- Role: Rider
- Rider type: Sprinter

Professional teams
- 1982–1983: 7 Eleven – Schwinn
- 1984: Gianni Motta – Linea
- 1985–1990: 7-Eleven
- 1991–1993: Coors Light

Major wins
- Grand Tours Tour de France 2 individual stages (1986, 1987) One-day races and Classics National Road Race Championships (1991)
Medal record
Representing the United States
Men's road bicycle racing
Olympic Games
Bronze medal – third place	1984 Los Angeles	Team time trial

Davis Phinney (born July 10, 1959) is a retired professional road bicycle racer from the United States. He won 328 races in the 1980s and 1990s, a record for an American, including two Tour de France stages. He has worked in media since retiring as a professional cyclist. He was diagnosed with Parkinson's disease at age 40.

== Career ==
=== Racing cyclist ===
He was a brazen sprinter and a star of the 7-Eleven Cycling Team in the 1980s and early '90s, and is the leader in race victories by an American, with 328. In 1986, he became the second American to win a stage at the Tour de France, while riding for American-based 7-Eleven. His racing career spanned two decades and included two stage victories in the Tour de France, a United States National Road Race Championships title, and the 1984 Olympic Bronze Medal in the Men's 100 km Team Time Trial along with Ron Kiefel, Roy Knickman, and Andrew Weaver.

Aside from Greg LeMond, Phinney is the only American rider to make a legitimate run at winning the Green Jersey in the Tour de France. LeMond and he are the only two American riders to come in the top three of this classification. Phinney finished second in the points classification during the 1988 Tour de France.

=== Career after racing ===
Since retiring from cycling, Phinney has remained active as a cycling sports commentator, public speaker, journalist, and avid Nordic ski racer.

== Family ==
He is married to champion cyclist Connie Carpenter-Phinney, with whom he has two children, Taylor and Kelsey. On August 9, 2007, Taylor became the Junior World Time Trial champion at the 2007 UCI Junior World Road and Track Championships held in Aguascalientes, Mexico, and on September 29, 2010, he became the 2010 UCI Under 23 World Time Trial champion.

== Parkinson's disease ==
Phinney was diagnosed with Parkinson's disease at age 40, and established the Davis Phinney Foundation in 2004, a registered 501(c)(3) nonprofit organization. As Taylor was about to go to the Beijing Olympics late in 2008, Davis underwent deep brain stimulation in an effort to control some of his symptoms. Jaimie Henderson, a neurosurgeon at Stanford University Medical Center, implanted two electrodes 2.5 inches (64 mm) into either side of Phinney's brain, powered by a pacemaker in his chest. According to ESPN, the procedure was risky and not promising, but worked instantly. Phinney explained:

The doctor said, 'OK, let's try a little current now, and just like that, all these muscles that had been at war with each other suddenly were at peace. It was like Armistice Day. It was just like, 'Oh … my … god!' I looked at my wife and she was crying. She said, 'I haven't seen your smile in a year!'

By 2012, the disease was setting in again. Doctors told him the brain pacemaker could turn the clock back on the progress of Parkinson's five years. Four years after the surgery, while Phinney did not shake like he used to, his balance was severely compromised.

== Major results ==
1981
Coors Classic

1st Points classification
1st Stage 6

1982
1st Points classification Coors Classic
1983
1st Team time trial, Pan American Games
Coors Classic

1st Points classification
1st Stages 2, 4, 5b & 9

1984
1st Stage 7 GP Tell
1st Points classification Coors Classic
Olympic Games

3rd Team time trial
5th Road race

1985
Coors Classic

1st Points classification
1st Stages 3 & 13

5th Milano–Torino
8th Overall Étoile de Bessèges
1986
1st Stage 3 Tour de France
Coors Classic

1st Points classification
1st Stages 2b, 4b & 11b

1987
1st Stage 12 Tour de France
9th Overall Coors Classic

1st Points classification
1st Stage 10

1988
1st Overall Coors Classic

1st Prologue, Stages 4b, 6a & 8

1st Stage 6 Tour de Romandie
1989
5th Overall Tour de Trump

1st Stages 8 & 9

1990
3rd Kuurne–Brussels–Kuurne
1991
1st Road race, National Road Championships
1st Fitchburg Longsjo Classic
Tour DuPont

1st Points classification
1st Stage 1

1993
1st Fitchburg Longsjo Classic

=== Grand Tour general classification results timeline ===
Race	1985	1986	1987	1988	1989	1990
Vuelta a España	Did not contest during his career					
Giro d'Italia	104	—	—	118	DNF	—
Tour de France	—	DNF	DNF	105	—	153

Legend
—	Did not compete
DNF	Did not finish
