= Tour DuPont =

Former American cycling stage race

Tour de Trump (1989–1990) Tour DuPont (1991–1996)
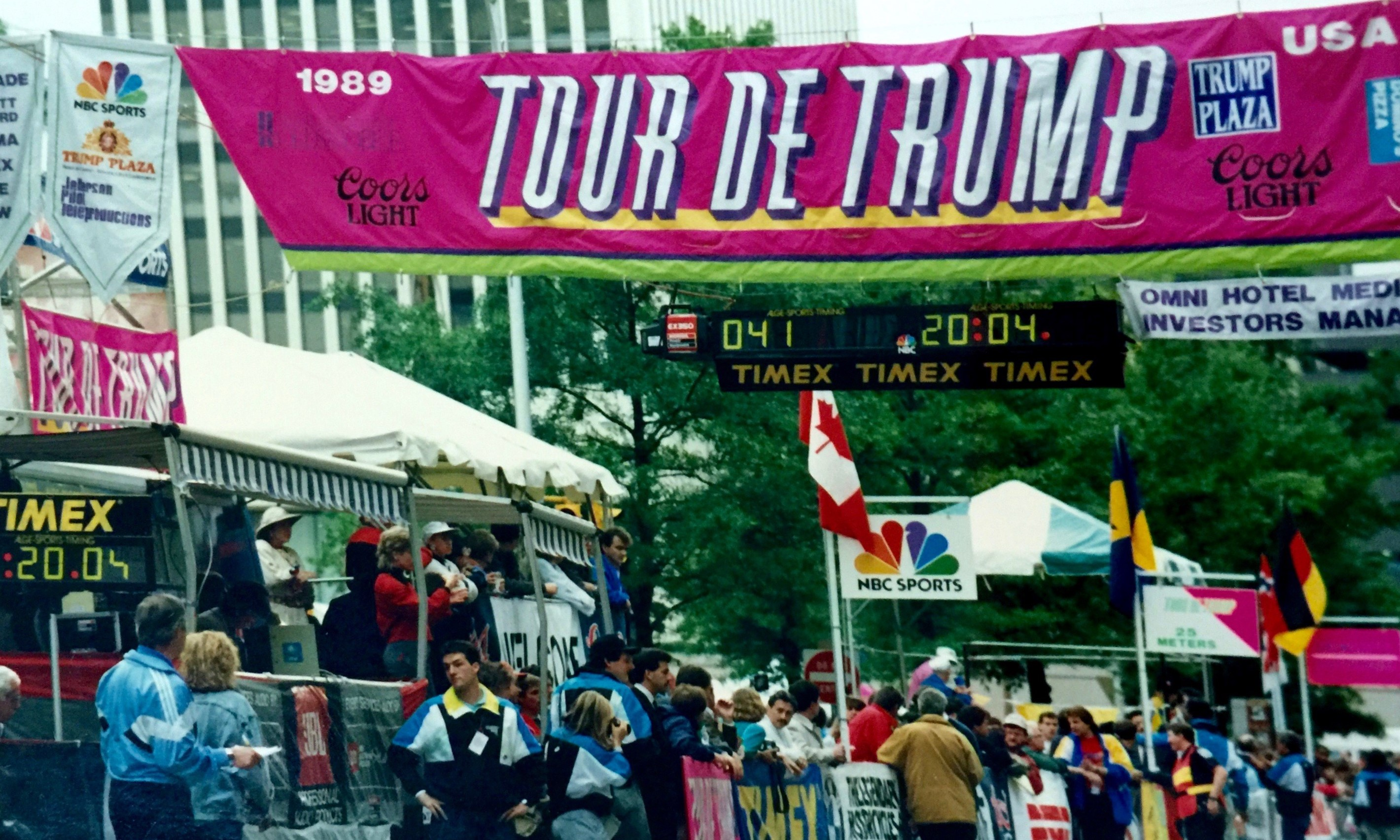
- 1989 Tour de Trump stage finish in Richmond, Virginia

Race details
- Date: April–May
- Region: Mid-Atlantic states, United States
- Discipline: Road race
- Type: Stage race

History
- First edition: 1989
- Editions: 8
- Final edition: 1996
- First winner: (Norway) Dag Otto Lauritzen
- Most wins: (Mexico) Raúl Alcalá (2 wins) (United States) Lance Armstrong (2 wins)
- Final winner: (United States) Lance Armstrong

The Tour DuPont was a cycling stage race in the United States held annually between 1989 and 1996, initially called the Tour de Trump in the first two years. It was intended to become a North American cycling event similar in format and prestige to the Tour de France. The tour's names came from its sponsors, first the businessman (and future U.S. President) Donald Trump and then later DuPont.

The race was held in the mid-Atlantic states, including areas near DuPont's Wilmington, Delaware, headquarters. DuPont withdrew their sponsorship of the race after the 1996 edition, and the event has not been run since. During the eight-year history of the race as both the Tour de Trump and the Tour DuPont, it was won twice by Mexican rider Raúl Alcalá and twice by American Lance Armstrong. The race was cited as evidence of Richmond, Virginia's ability to host international cycle racing when the city successfully bid for the 2015 UCI Road World Championships.

== Origins as the Tour de Trump ==
The race was originally sponsored by Donald Trump and known as the "Tour de Trump" in 1989 and 1990. The idea for the race was conceived by CBS Sports reporter John Tesh, who had covered the 1987 Tour de France and on his return suggested holding a race in the United States to the basketball commentator and entrepreneur Billy Packer. Packer originally planned to call the race the Tour de Jersey. He approached representatives of casinos in Atlantic City for sponsorship, and Trump offered to be the race's primary sponsor and Packer's business partner in the venture. It was Packer who suggested the Tour de Trump name. Speaking at the time of the start of the first Tour de Trump in May 1989, Trump himself stated that "When [the name] was initially stated, I practically fell out of my seat. I said, 'Are you kidding? I will get killed in the media if I use that name. You absolutely have to be kidding'". However, Trump reportedly changed his mind within 20 seconds, and was convinced by the commercial value of the name.

Trump's lawyers subsequently sent a "cease and desist" letter to the organizers of a bike race held in Aspen, Colorado called the Tour de Rump. The letter stated: "You are using the name and mark Tour de Rump in connection with an 'inaugural' cycling event. Your use of that name and mark is likely to cause confusion and constitutes trademark infringement, unfair competition and false designation of origin, all in violation of applicable federal and state laws". The organizer Ron Krajian's lawyer responded by arguing that his race was a local and non-commercial event, and predated the Tour de Trump. No response was received from Trump's lawyers, and the Tour de Rump went ahead.

The total prize money on offer for the first event in 1989 was US$250,000, including $50,000 for the winner of the general classification. This, together with the race's place in the international calendar between the Giro d'Italia and the Tour de France, made it attractive to high-profile riders and teams, but the event did not attract large crowds. Interviewed on NBC prior to the start of the 1989 race, Trump stated that "I would like to make this the equivalent of the Tour de France". The race filled a gap left by the demise of the Coors International Bicycle Classic, which had been North America's major stage race but which folded following its 1988 edition. Some European teams reportedly missed the Vuelta a España in order to race the Tour de Trump.

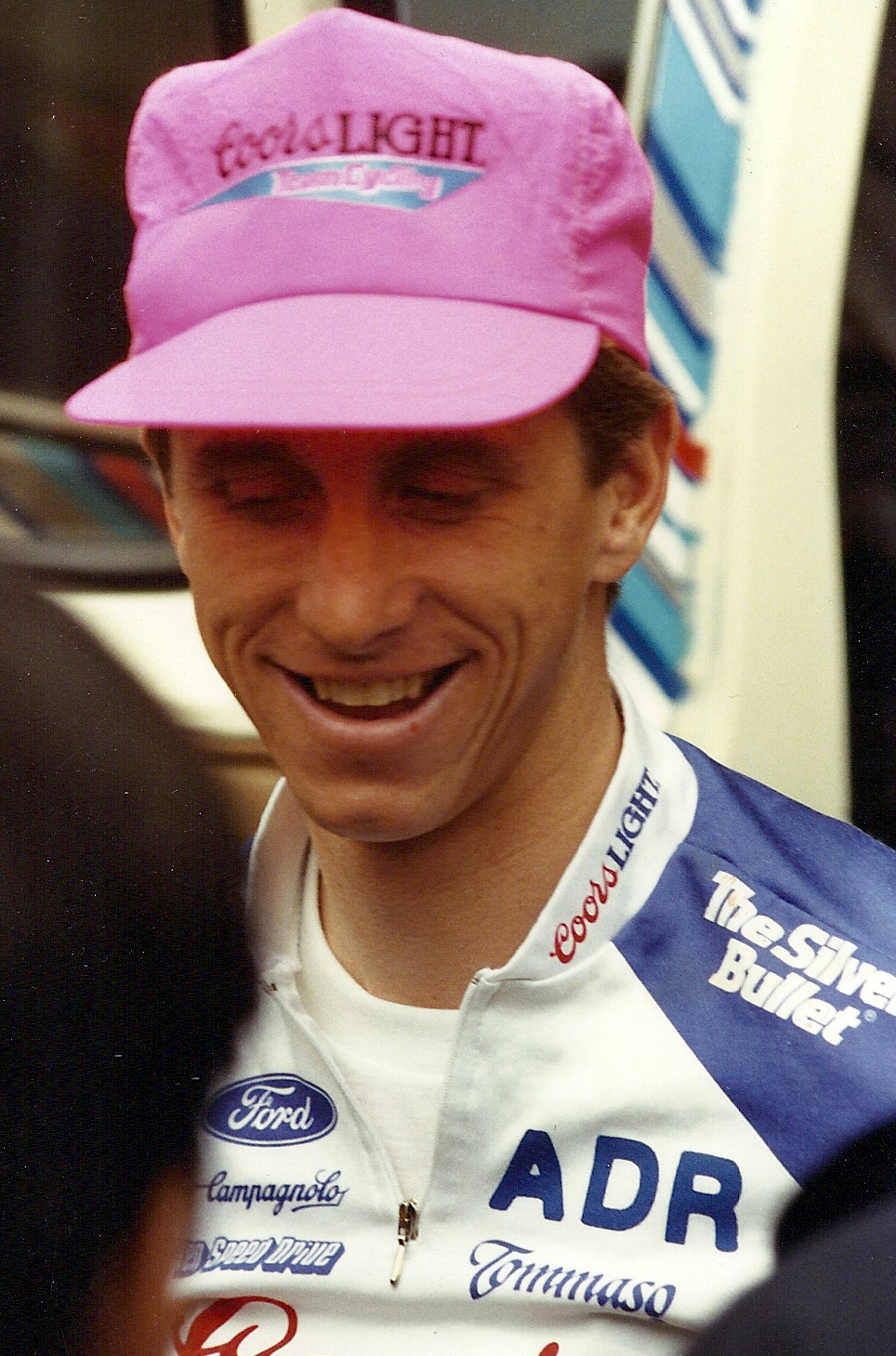
Greg LeMond at the 1989 Tour de Trump

The inaugural Tour de Trump started in Albany, New York, and consisted of 10 stages, totalling 837 miles (1,347 km), taking in five Eastern states. The route took the race south from Albany to Richmond, Virginia, and then across to Atlantic City, where it finished in front of Trump's casino. Some 114 riders from eight professional and 11 amateur teams competed. Riders competing included Greg LeMond, and Andrew Hampsten, and the teams represented included Lotto, Panasonic, PDM, and the Soviet national squad.

The race was met by anti-Trump protests in the first-stage finishing town of New Paltz, New York, where demonstrators held placards reading "Fight Trumpism", "Die Yuppie $cum", "The Art of the Deal = The Rich Get Richer" and "Trump = Lord of the Flies". The 1989 race was won by the Norwegian rider Dag Otto Lauritzen of the American team 7-Eleven, although there was some controversy about the result as Belgian rider Eric Vanderaerden, who had won four stages and was expected to take the lead in the general classification in the final stage time trial in Atlantic City but took a wrong turn following a race motorbike. The Soviet rider Viatcheslav Ekimov, who took part as an amateur, won the first stage of the race (following a prologue time trial). Articles published the following year reported that Ekimov "had had the nerve to win a stage as an amateur ... and some pros reportedly rewarded him by jamming a feed bag into his wheel", and that he "threatened to win the Tour de Trump last year as an amateur before the pros banded together to eliminate any chance he had of winning". Nonetheless, the first edition of the race was described as "a smashing success" in Sports Illustrated, which noted: "If you could get past the name, the Tour de Trump, without losing your lunch, and if you could somehow divorce the sporting event from the excess baggage that went with it ... what you had was a pretty nice bicycle race".

Following the first event, Packer wanted to expand the race to take in more states. The 1990 race started on May 4 in Wilmington in Delaware, a state which Trump considered important for his three casinos in Atlantic City, and also visited Baltimore, after Trump agreed to local racecourse owner Joe De Francis's condition that he moor his yacht the Trump Princess in Baltimore Harbor during the race. It finished in Boston on May 13. Entrants in 1990 included 1989 winner Dag Otto Lauritzen, Greg LeMond, Steve Bauer, who had finished second in Paris–Roubaix that year, Andrew Hampsten, Davis Phinney, Ekimov, in his first year as a professional, and East German rider Olaf Ludwig. The race was won by Mexican rider Raúl Alcalá of the PDM–Concorde team.

After two editions, Trump withdrew his sponsorship of the race due to his business's financial problems. According to Packer, reflecting on the event in 2016, he and Trump "parted as good business friends", although he also explained that Trump's personality and celebrity, as well as the scandals surrounding Trump's marriage and business affairs, distracted from the event and annoyed European riders in the race.

== DuPont sponsorship era ==
After Trump withdrew from sponsoring the event, DuPont became the primary sponsor. Between 1991 and 1995, national amateur teams took part alongside professional teams. The event attracted well-known competitors, including Lance Armstrong and Greg LeMond, and was attended by high-profile European-based professional cycling teams. In 1996, the Union Cycliste Internationale upgraded it to a 2.1 ranked race, meaning that amateurs could no longer compete. This made the race the highest ranked outside of Europe and the first North American stage race to be ranked 2.1. The 1996 race was the subject of a number of legal issues, including a dispute over rights to its profits between the race owners, Billy Packer and president of the United States Cycling Federation Mike Plant, which resulted in them suing each other. DuPont itself was involved in a dispute about the anti-homosexual employment policies of the local government in Greenville, South Carolina, with the company insisting that the race organizers exclude the city from the route. After 1996, DuPont dropped its sponsorship and the race has not been run since.

During its six years as the Tour DuPont, the race was won by Dutch rider Erik Breukink, Greg LeMond, Raúl Alcalá, Russian Viatcheslav Ekimov, and twice by Lance Armstrong. Over this time, a prologue time trial held in Wilmington, Delaware, became the traditional start to the race. Between 1992 and 1994, the race included a stage from Port Deposit and Hagerstown in Maryland, but in 1995, South Carolina was included on the route for the first time in its place. Every edition of the Tour DuPont visited Richmond, Virginia.

Breukink won in 1991 by overcoming a 50-second deficit going into the final stage, a 16.1-mile (25.9 km) individual time trial, despite puncturing 15 minutes into the stage, to win by 12 seconds from Norwegian Atle Kvålsvoll. In 1992, American Greg LeMond won the overall classification. It was the last major win of his career, although he competed in the race again in 1994. Alcalá's victory in the race in 1993 was his second, having won the Tour de Trump in 1990. In 1993, he beat Lance Armstrong, who had held the leader's jersey going into the final stage. Armstrong's first participation in the race had been in 1991, when he finished midway down the overall classification. According to The Guardian in 2008, his performance in the 1991 Tour DuPont "marked the arrival of a promising newcomer to the sport". In 1994, Alcalá and Armstrong returned to the race as teammates, both riding for Motorola. The race took place over 11 stages, covering 1,050 miles (1,690 km). That year, Ekimov won the overall title, with Armstrong finishing second again. Armstrong finally won the overall classification of the Tour DuPont in 1995, when the race was held over 1,130 miles (1,820 km), despite losing more than two minutes to Ekimov on the final-stage time trial. The final edition of the race, held in 1996, was also won by Armstrong, who became the first and only rider to win two editions of the event back-to-back. The French rider Pascal Hervé, of the Festina cycling team, was second. The total prize money for the 1996 race was in excess of US$260,000.

In July 1996, DuPont announced that it was ending its sponsorship of the race. According to a brand manager for the company, "Over the past six years, the Tour DuPont has been an excellent vehicle for promoting our products. However, we need to focus more on strategic markets in other parts of the world, where a sustained annual program versus a two-week event can better leverage the DuPont brand equity for profitable growth". Race organizer Mike Plant explained that "I talked to them a couple of months ago, and they had to make a hard decision. They don't have hundreds of millions of dollars to put into worldwide advertising. They put a ton of money into this event and they built up a valuable franchise, but, like Motorola, corporations change the way they do business". Plant reported that polling had shown that public recognition of the event had grown significantly, but also that awareness of who sponsored it had declined.

Historian Eric Reed notes that a DuPont marketing executive characterized the initial sponsorship as "a bargain", and that the company claimed that the American press clippings generated by the event weighed 29 pounds (13 kg). DuPont executives also reported that they valued the global media exposure as worth close to US$70 million. Reed quotes a DuPont marketing executive as stating: "In 40 years in [media relations], I have never seen such concentrated, sustained and positive media coverage". However, Reed argues that despite this initial enthusiasm, "the Tour DuPont's chronic weaknesses hamstrung the event's growth", citing its "pro-am" status, which prevented professional riders from being able to win world ranking points in the event. He also states that despite having an estimated worldwide television audience of 200 million, "American fan enthusiasm and roadside spectator interest in the event failed to spike significantly".

DuPont's withdrawal also came months after John DuPont, heir to the Du Pont family fortune, had been arrested for the murder of Olympic wrestler Dave Schultz. At the time of the announcement of DuPont's discontinuation of sponsorship, Mike Plant reported that a 1997 event was tentatively scheduled for May 1–11, and that he had been in discussions with ten companies about potential title sponsorship of the race.

== Past winners ==
Year	Country	Rider	Team
1989	Norway	Dag Otto Lauritzen	7-Eleven
1990	Mexico	Raúl Alcalá	PDM–Concorde–Ultima
1991	Netherlands	Erik Breukink	PDM–Concorde–Ultima
1992	United States	Greg LeMond	Z
1993	Mexico	Raúl Alcalá	WordPerfect–Colnago–Decca
1994	Russia	Viatcheslav Ekimov	WordPerfect–Colnago–Decca
1995	United States	Lance Armstrong	Motorola
1996	United States	Lance Armstrong	Motorola

== Legacy ==
Organizers Packer and Plant arranged another race, in China, though it was short-lived. Before their falling out, Packer reports that his "idea was to have a Triple Crown of cycling–one in Asia, one in America and have the Tour de France to be the third leg". When the Tour de Georgia was first run in 2003, Tim Maloney of Cyclingnews.com referred to it as "the prodigal son of Tour DuPont". In 2015, the UCI Road World Championships were held in Richmond, Virginia, which had previously hosted stages of the Tour de Trump and the Tour DuPont. In 1994, the Tour DuPont included a stage that concluded with several laps of a circuit incorporating the cobbled climb of Libby Hill Park. This hill was included in the circuit of the 2015 World Championship road races. Tour de Trump and Tour DuPont organizer Mike Plant was, according to USA Cycling, instrumental in Richmond's bid to hold the World Championships. As a member of the UCI Management Committee, when Richmond was announced as winning the bidding for the 2015 event, Plant commented that "Richmond stepped up and proved they could support world class cycling when we brought the Tour de Trump and Tour DuPont to the city in the late '80s and early '90s".
