= 7-Eleven (cycling team) =

American professional cycling team

Team information
- Registered: United States
- Founded: 1981
- Disbanded: 1996
- Discipline: Road

Key personnel
- General manager: Jim Ochowicz

Team name history
- 1981–1990 1991–1996: 7-Eleven; Motorola

The 7-Eleven Cycling Team, later the Motorola Cycling Team, was a bicycle racing team founded in the U.S. in 1981 by Jim Ochowicz, a former U.S. Olympic cyclist. Initially an amateur team, the men's team shifted to professional status in 1985. The team lasted 16 years, under the sponsorship of 7-Eleven through 1990 and then Motorola from 1990 through 1996. From 1982 to 1983, it rode on Rossin cycles, and later 1989 to 1996 it rode on Eddy Merckx bikes.

== History ==
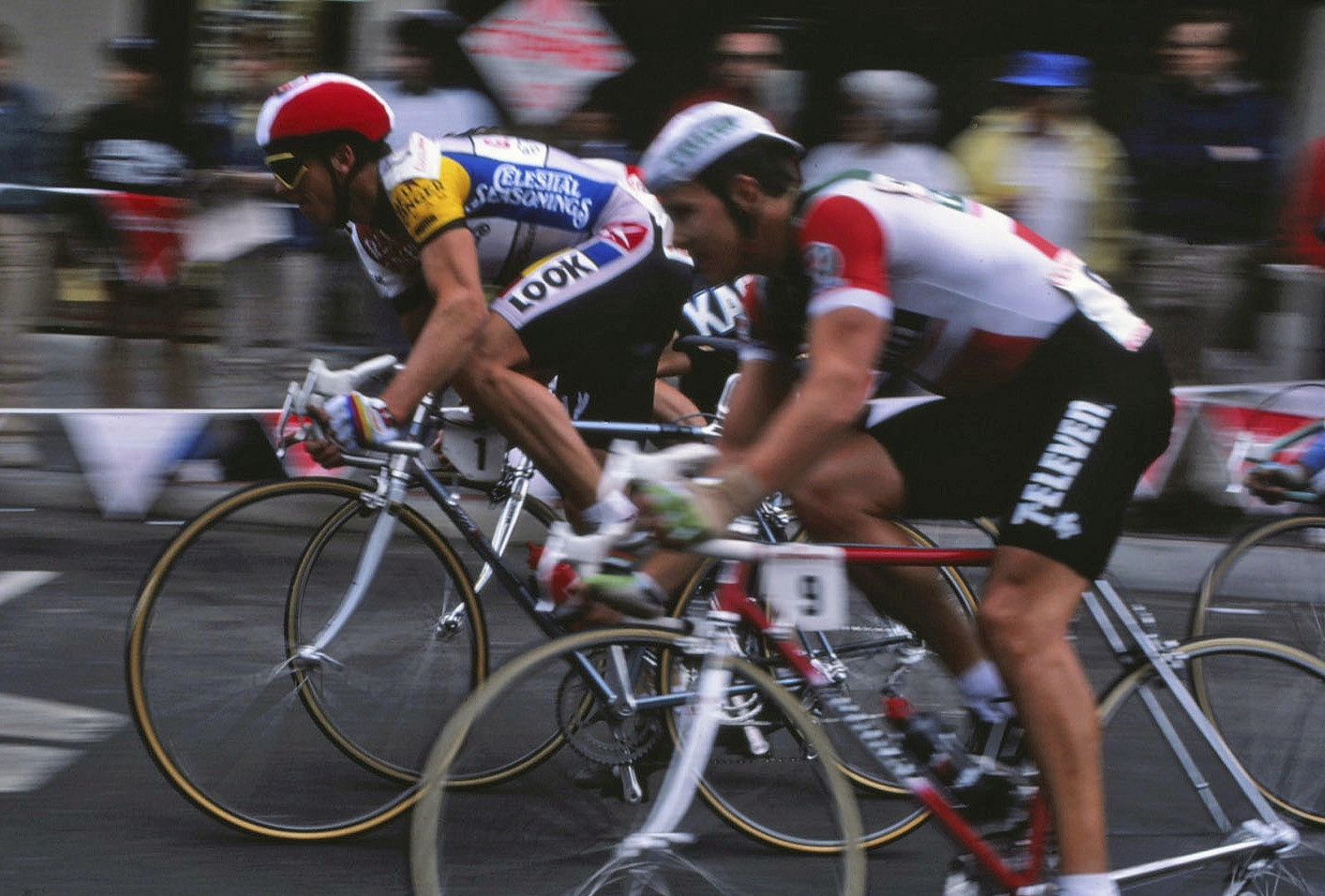
Davis Phinney, Team 7-Eleven rider, corners on Greg LeMond's left during the Fisherman's Wharf Criterium stage of the 1986 Coors Classic in San Francisco, CA.

7-Eleven was formed as an amateur cycling team in 1981 by Ochowicz, a 29-year-old former Olympic cyclist from the U.S., who was married to Olympic speed skating gold medalist Sheila Young. Ochowicz had managed the U.S. national speed-skating team and was friends with Eric and Beth Heiden, who were both excellent cyclists as well as champion speed skaters. He managed to get sponsorship from the Southland Corporation, owners of the 7-Eleven convenience-store chain, and bicycle manufacturer Schwinn to form an amateur team. Of the seven men on the inaugural 7-Eleven-Schwinn team racing in 1981, Eric Heiden (who swept the gold medals in speed skating in the 1980 Winter Olympics) was the captain and the best known. The other Americans were Jeff Bradley, Greg Demgen, Bradley Davies, Tom Schuler, Danny Van Haute and Roger Young (Ochowicz's brother-in-law). They were joined by Canadian Ron Hayman. Although Schwinn dropped out as a co-sponsor in 1982, 7-Eleven added a women's team with Rebecca Twigg, among others, as well as more male riders, including Davis Phinney, Ron Kiefel and Canadian Alex Stieda. The all-amateur 7-Eleven team was featured in the 1985 movie American Flyers, starring Kevin Costner. The 1986 Cycling Media Guide published for the 1986 World Championships lists Jeff Bradley, Chris Carmichael, Alexi Grewal, Eric Heiden, Ron Kiefel, Davis Phinney, Bob Roll, Tom Schuler, Doug Shapiro and Alex Stieda with an additional group of amateur men on the team including Frankie Andreu, Curt Harnett, David Lettieri, Robert Mathis, Leonard "Harvey" Nitz and Russell Scott.

Southland continued its commitment by sponsoring the cycling venue at the 1984 Summer Olympics in Los Angeles, where nine Americans won cycling medals. The other (especially equipment) sponsors of the team included Descente, Huffy, Campagnolo, and Tag Heuer. Often, those sponsors elected not to continue after their initial contracts were completed.

In 1985, Ochowitz changed the men's team's status to professional and asked Mike Neel to be the directeur sportif in Europe. The team went to Europe with an initial roster of members including Olympic gold medalists Alexi Grewal and Heiden, Olympic bronze medalists Phinney and Kiefel, Bradley, Schuler, Hayman, Stieda, and Chris Carmichael. When the team received an invitation to the 1985 Giro d'Italia, one of the Grand Tours of Europe, a young American cyclist based in Europe named Andrew Hampsten was added to the team under a 30-day contract for the race. After both Kiefel and Hampsten stunningly won stages during the Giro, becoming the first American stage winners ever at a Grand Tour, 7-Eleven was invited to the 1986 Tour de France and became one of the major cycling teams for the next decade, under the sponsorship of Southland through 1990 and then Motorola through 1996. Ochowicz disbanded the team after the 1996 season, when Motorola decided to discontinue sponsorship.

While it was not the first professional cycling team in the U.S., 7-Eleven was responsible for an overall increase in bike racing interest in the U.S. The team claimed a win in a Grand Tour, when Andrew Hampsten won the general classification as well as the mountains classification at the 1988 Giro d'Italia (Tour of Italy). It also claimed a handful of world championship medals and US championships, as well as Tour de France and Giro stage wins and one more Grand Tour podium (Hampsten's third in the 1989 Giro d'Italia). It was the second U.S. team to ride the Giro d'Italia (1985) (the Gianni Motta team was the first in 1984) and in the Tour de France (1986), where two Canadian riders on the team held the yellow jersey on different occasions (Alex Stieda in 1986 and Steve Bauer in 1990). Its Tour de France stage winners included Phinney, Jeff Pierce, Hampsten, Sean Yates and Dag Otto Lauritzen from Norway. In 1989 Brian Walton won the pro-am Milk Race (Tour of Britain). As of 2009, Team 7-Eleven is the only cycling team to have been inducted into the United States Bicycling Hall of Fame.

During 2025 Liège–Bastogne–Liège Norwegian cycling team Uno-X Mobility raced in 7-Eleven jerseys. Both Uno-X and 7-Eleven are owned by Reitan conglomerate.

=== Bike sponsor ===
Five bike manufacturers sponsored the team throughout the years: Schwinn 1981, Rossin Bikes supplied by Neel & Katz from 1982 to 1983, Murray from 1984 to 1986, Huffy from 1987 to 1988, although the team bikes from 1985 to 1988 were primarily built by Ben Serotta. Murray also relabeled the remaining Rossin bikes before the start of the 1984 season. Team member Ron Keifel recalls...

"I joined the team in 1982. Our early team bikes were Italian Rossins with Campy Record parts. Italian frames always fit me well, as they tended to have shorter top tubes. My bikes were generally 59x57cm, 73-degree seat angle. They worked well and we won lots of races."

Finally Eddy Merckx sponsored the team from 1989 through their ultimate cessation in 1996. For Eddy Merckx, sponsoring the American team had a special meaning. Eddy Merckx said:

"I had a special relationship with the 7-Eleven team. They were happy to have somebody with my racing and frame-building experience. For me [it] remains a great memory. I was happy I could make them more successful in Europe, and to see the positive influence they had on the US as a whole. If I had do it over, I would make the same choice straight away."

=== Race radios ===
During Motorola's sponsorship of the team in the 1990s, the riders began communicating with the team cars through the use of two-way radios built by Motorola. The radios were slowly adopted through the rest of the professional peloton, becoming standard equipment by 2002. Acceptance of these radios was hastened by the success in the Tour de France of former Motorola rider Lance Armstrong, who continued to use a race radio when he joined the U.S. Postal Service cycling team.

== Major wins ==
1982
Stage 5a Coors Classic, Ron Hayman
Stage 20 Coors Classic, Ron Hayman
Lowenbrau-Pepsi Grand Prix, Eric Heiden
Great Mohawk Carpet Classic, Ron Hayman
1983
United States U.S. Pro Cycling Championships, Davis Phinney
1984
Stage 1a Coors Classic, Team Time Trial
Stage 1b Coors Classic, Davis Phinney
Stage 6 Coors Classic, Davis Phinney
1985
Prologue Coors Classic, Ron Kiefel
Stage 2b Coors Classic, Davis Phinney
Stage 4b Coors Classic, Davis Phinney
Stage 7 Coors Classic, Bob Roll
Stage 10 Coors Classic, Doug Shapiro
Stage 11a Coors Classic, Davis Phinney
United States National Road Race Championships, Eric Heiden
Stage 15 Giro d'Italia, Ron Kiefel
Stage 20 Giro d'Italia, Andrew Hampsten
Trofeo Laigueglia, Ron Kiefel
1986
Prologue Coors Classic, Ron Kiefel
Stage 2b Coors Classic, Davis Phinney
Stage 4b Coors Classic, Davis Phinney
Stage 6 Coors Classic, Raúl Alcalá
Stage 11b Coors Classic, Davis Phinney
Stage 13 Coors Classic, Ron Kiefel
Stage 3 Tour de France, Davis Phinney
1987
Prologue Coors Classic, Raúl Alcalá
Stage 1 Coors Classic, Raúl Alcalá
Stage 9 Coors Classic, Andrew Hampsten
Stage 10 Coors Classic, Raúl Alcalá
Stage 12a Coors Classic, Andrew Hampsten
Stage 13 Coors Classic, Raúl Alcalá
General Classification Coors Classic, Raúl Alcalá
United States National Road Race Championships, Tom Schuler
Rund um den Finanzplatz Eschborn-Frankfurt, Dag Otto Lauritzen
Overall Tour de Suisse, Andrew Hampsten
Stage 12 Tour de France, Davis Phinney
Stage 14 Tour de France, Dag Otto Lauritzen
Stage 25 Tour de France, Jeff Pierce
1988
Giro di Toscana, Ron Kiefel
United States National Road Race Championships, Ron Kiefel
Stage 3 Paris–Nice, Andrew Hampsten
Stage 3 Tour de Romandie, Bob Roll
Stage 5 Tour de Romandie, Davis Phinney
Overall Giro d'Italia, Andrew Hampsten

King of the Mountains Classification
Stages 12 & 18, Andrew Hampsten

1989
Grand Prix Eddy Merckx, Sean Yates
Overall Tour de Belgique, Sean Yates
Stage 2 Tour de Romandie, jens Veggerby
Overall Tour de Trump. Dag-Otto Lauritzen
Clasica Ciclista San Sebastian, Gerhard Zadrobilek
Urkiola Igoera - Subida Urkiola, Andrew Hampsten
1990
Stage 1 Etoile de Besseges, Scott McKinley
Stage 1 Tour de Suisse, Nathan Dahlberg
Stage 7 Tour de Suisse, Andrew Hampsten
Urkiola Igoera - Subida Urkiola, Andrew Hampsten
1991
Overall Tour Méditerranéen, Phil Anderson
Wateringse Wielerdag, Phil Anderson
Stage 5 Critérium du Dauphiné, Sean Yates
Stage 8 Tour de Suisse, Phil Anderson
Stage 10 Tour de France, Phil Anderson
1992
Overall Tour de Romandie, Sean Yates

Stage 3 Tour de Romandie, Andrew Hampsten
Stage 5 Tour de Romandie, Maximilian Sciandri

Stage 14 Tour de France, Andrew Hampsten
Stage 2 Giro d'Italia, Maximilian Sciandri
United Kingdom National Road Race Championship, Sean Yates
GP d´Isbergues, Phil Anderson
1993
United States National Road Race Championship, Lance Armstrong
Overall Tour of Sweden, Phil Anderson
Giro del Veneto, Maximilian Sciandri
Coppa Placci, Maximilian Sciandri
Overall Tour de Luxembourg, Maximilian Sciandri
Trofeo Laigueglia
Stage 8 Tour de France, Lance Armstrong
World Road Race Championship, Lance Armstrong
Grand Prix de Fourmies, Maximilian Sciandri
Overall Volta Ciclista a Catalunya, Alvaro Mejia Castrillon
GP Raymond Impanis, Phil Anderson
1994
GP Herning, Brian Smith
Overall Route du Sud, Alvaro Mejia Castrillon
United Kingdom National Road Race Championship, Brian Smith
Stage 6 Tour de Pologne, Frankie Andreu
1995
Profronde van Almelo, Max van Heeswijk
Criterium Woerden, Wiebren Veenstra
Acht van Chaam, George Hincapie
Stage 5 Paris–Nice, Lance Armstrong
Stage 2 Critérium du Dauphiné, Wiebren Veenstra
Stage 18 Tour de France, Lance Armstrong
Clasica Ciclista San Sebastian, Lance Armstrong
1996
Vuelta a Castilla y León, Andrea Peron
Stage 8a Paris–Nice, Maximilian Sciandri
La Flèche Wallonne, Lance Armstrong
