= List of teams and cyclists in the 1980 Giro d'Italia =

The 1980 Giro d'Italia was the 63rd edition of the Giro d'Italia, one of cycling's Grand Tours. The field consisted of 130 riders, and 89 riders finished the race.

== By rider ==
Legend
No.	Starting number worn by the rider during the Giro
Pos.	Position in the general classification
DNF	Denotes a rider who did not finish

No.	Name	Nationality	Team	Ref
1	Giuseppe Saronni	Italy	Gis Gelati	
2	Roberto Ceruti	Italy	Gis Gelati	
3	Silvano Cervato	Italy	Gis Gelati	
4	Simone Fraccaro	Italy	Gis Gelati	
5	Joseph Fuchs	Switzerland	Gis Gelati	
6	Gabriele Landoni	Italy	Gis Gelati	
7	Valerio Lualdi	Italy	Gis Gelati	
8	Wladimiro Panizza	Italy	Gis Gelati	
9	Giuseppe Passuello	Italy	Gis Gelati	
10	Gianluigi Zuanel	Italy	Gis Gelati	
11	Gianbattista Baronchelli	Italy	Bianchi–Piaggio	
12	Gaetano Baronchelli	Italy	Bianchi–Piaggio	
13	Silvano Contini	Italy	Bianchi–Piaggio	
14	Aldo Donadello	Italy	Bianchi–Piaggio	
15	Knut Knudsen	Norway	Bianchi–Piaggio	
16	Serge Parsani	Italy	Bianchi–Piaggio	
17	Alessandro Pozzi	Italy	Bianchi–Piaggio	
18	Tommy Prim	Sweden	Bianchi–Piaggio	
19	Claudio Torelli	Italy	Bianchi–Piaggio	
20	Ennio Vanotti	Italy	Bianchi–Piaggio	
21	Godi Schmutz	Switzerland	Cilo–Aufina	
22	Guido Amrhein	Switzerland	Cilo–Aufina	
23	Thierry Bolle	Switzerland	Cilo–Aufina	
24	Serge Demierre	Switzerland	Cilo–Aufina	
25	Sergio Gerosa	Switzerland	Cilo–Aufina	
26	Urs Grobli	Switzerland	Cilo–Aufina	
27	Erwin Lienhard	Switzerland	Cilo–Aufina	
28	Georges Luthi	Switzerland	Cilo–Aufina	
29	Marcel Summermatter	Switzerland	Cilo–Aufina	
30	Josef Wehrli	Switzerland	Cilo–Aufina	
31	Alfio Vandi	Italy	Famcucine	
32	Annunzio Colombo	Italy	Famcucine	
33	Antonio D'alonzo	Italy	Famcucine	
34	Corrado Donadio	Italy	Famcucine	
35	Giuseppe Fatato	Italy	Famcucine	
36	Aldo Parecchini	Italy	Famcucine	
37	Graziano Rossi	Italy	Famcucine	
38	Graziano Salvietti	Italy	Famcucine	
39	Glauco Santoni	Italy	Famcucine	
40	Angelo Tosoni	Italy	Famcucine	
41	Mario Beccia	Italy	Hoonved–Bottecchia	
42	Luciano Borgognoni	Italy	Hoonved–Bottecchia	
43	Giuliano Cazzolato	Italy	Hoonved–Bottecchia	
44	Álvaro Crespi	Italy	Hoonved–Bottecchia	
45	Vincenzo De Caro	Italy	Hoonved–Bottecchia	
46	Fiorenzo Favero	Italy	Hoonved–Bottecchia	
47	Luciano Loro	Italy	Hoonved–Bottecchia	
48	Giovanni Mantovani	Italy	Hoonved–Bottecchia	
49	Dante Morandi	Italy	Hoonved–Bottecchia	
50	Sergio Santimaria	Italy	Hoonved–Bottecchia	
51	Giovanni Battaglin	Italy	Inoxpran	
52	Nazzareno Berto	Italy	Inoxpran	
53	Alfredo Chinetti	Italy	Inoxpran	
54	Alfonso Dal Pian	Italy	Inoxpran	
55	Gianfranco Foresti	Italy	Inoxpran	
56	Bruno Leali	Italy	Inoxpran	
57	Jørgen Marcussen	Denmark	Inoxpran	
58	Pasquale Pugliese	Italy	Inoxpran	
59	Roy Schuiten	Netherlands	Inoxpran	
60	Amilcare Sgalbazzi	Italy	Inoxpran	
61	Heinz Betz	West Germany	Kondor	
62	Werner Betz	West Germany	Kondor	
63	Peter Kehl	West Germany	Kondor	
64	Hans Hindelang	West Germany	Kondor	
65	Horst Schütz	West Germany	Kondor	
66	Guido Frei	Switzerland	Kondor	
67	Fridolin Keller	Switzerland	Kondor	
68	Daniele Tinchella	Italy	Kondor	
69	Luciano Donati	Italy	Kondor	
70	Bart Scheunemman	Netherlands	Kondor	
71	Pierino Gavazzi	Italy	Magniflex–Olmo	
72	Bernt Johansson	Sweden	Magniflex–Olmo	
73	Marino Amadori	Italy	Magniflex–Olmo	
74	Vittorio Algeri	Italy	Magniflex–Olmo	
75	Mario Noris	Italy	Magniflex–Olmo	
76	Giancarlo Casiraghi	Italy	Magniflex–Olmo	
77	Leonardo Natale	Italy	Magniflex–Olmo	
78	Ignazio Paleari	Italy	Magniflex–Olmo	
79	Riccardo Magrini	Italy	Magniflex–Olmo	
80	Stefano D'arcangelo	Italy	Magniflex–Olmo	
81	Francesco Masi	Italy	San Giacomo	
82	Tranquillo Andreetta	Italy	San Giacomo	
83	Fulvio Bertacco	Italy	San Giacomo	
84	Claudio Bortolotto	Italy	San Giacomo	
85	Franco Conti	Italy	San Giacomo	
86	Claudio Corti	Italy	San Giacomo	
87	Freddy Maertens	Belgium	San Giacomo	
88	Giuseppe Martinelli	Italy	San Giacomo	
89	Roberto Visentini	Italy	San Giacomo	
90	Maurizio Bertini	Italy	San Giacomo	
91	Hubert Arbès	France	Renault–Gitane	
92	Bernard Becaas	France	Renault–Gitane	
93	Jean-René Bernaudeau	France	Renault–Gitane	
94	Yvon Bertin	France	Renault–Gitane	
95	Lucien Dider	Luxembourg	Renault–Gitane	
96	Bernard Hinault	France	Renault–Gitane	
97	Maurice Le Guilloux	France	Renault–Gitane	
98	Bernard Quilfen	France	Renault–Gitane	
99	Pierre-Raymond Villemiane	France	Renault–Gitane	
100	Claude Vincendeau	France	Renault–Gitane	
101	Francesco Moser	Italy	Sanson–Campagnolo	
102	Carmelo Barone	Italy	Sanson–Campagnolo	
103	Fausto Bertoglio	Italy	Sanson–Campagnolo	
104	Gregor Braun	West Germany	Sanson–Campagnolo	
105	Ronald De Witte	Belgium	Sanson–Campagnolo	
106	Phil Edwards	Great Britain	Sanson–Campagnolo	
107	Palmiro Masciarelli	Italy	Sanson–Campagnolo	
108	Leonardo Mazzantini	Italy	Sanson–Campagnolo	
109	Walter Polini	Italy	Sanson–Campagnolo	
110	Attilio Rota	Italy	Sanson–Campagnolo	
111	Ángel Arroyo	Spain	Zor–Vereco	
112	Pedro Muñoz Machín Rodríguez	Spain	Zor–Vereco	
113	Juan Fernández	Spain	Zor–Vereco	
114	Miguel Angel Fernandez Vico	Spain	Zor–Vereco	
115	Eugenio Herranz	Spain	Zor–Vereco	
116	Rafael Ladron De Guevara	Spain	Zor–Vereco	
117	Miguel María Lasa	Spain	Zor–Vereco	
118	José Luis Lopez Cerron	Spain	Zor–Vereco	
119	Faustino Rupérez	Spain	Zor–Vereco	
120	Guillermo De La Pena	Spain	Zor–Vereco	
121	Alfons De Wolf	Belgium	Studio Casa–Fin–Italcasa–Colnago	
122	Fons Van Katwijk	Netherlands	Studio Casa–Fin–Italcasa–Colnago	
123	Adri van Houwelingen	Netherlands	Studio Casa–Fin–Italcasa–Colnago	
124	Jan van Houwelingen	Netherlands	Studio Casa–Fin–Italcasa–Colnago	
125	Roger De Cnijf	Belgium	Studio Casa–Fin–Italcasa–Colnago	
126	Étienne De Beule	Belgium	Studio Casa–Fin–Italcasa–Colnago	
127	Ronan De Meyer	Belgium	Studio Casa–Fin–Italcasa–Colnago	
128	Frans Van Vlierberghe	Italy	Studio Casa–Fin–Italcasa–Colnago	
129	Pietro Algeri	Italy	Studio Casa–Fin–Italcasa–Colnago	
130	Eddy Van Haerens	Belgium	Studio Casa–Fin–Italcasa–Colnago	
