= List of teams and cyclists in the 1979 Giro d'Italia =

The 1979 Giro d'Italia was the 62nd edition of the Giro d'Italia, one of cycling's Grand Tours. The field consisted of 130 riders, and 111 riders finished the race.

== By rider ==
Legend
No.	Starting number worn by the rider during the Giro
Pos.	Position in the general classification
DNF	Denotes a rider who did not finish

No.	Name	Nationality	Team	Ref
1	Johan De Muynck	Belgium	Bianchi–Faema	
2	Alex Van Linden	Belgium	Bianchi–Faema	
3	Silvano Contini	Italy	Bianchi–Faema	
4	Aldo Donadello	Italy	Bianchi–Faema	
5	Knut Knudsen	Norway	Bianchi–Faema	
6	Salvatore Maccali	Italy	Bianchi–Faema	
7	Valerio Lualdi	Italy	Bianchi–Faema	
8	Serge Parsani	Italy	Bianchi–Faema	
9	Aldo Parecchini	Italy	Bianchi–Faema	
10	Rik Van Linden	Belgium	Bianchi–Faema	
11	Fulvio Bertacco	Italy	CBM Fast–Gaggia	
12	Maurizio Bertini	Italy	CBM Fast–Gaggia	
13	Luciano Borgognoni	Italy	CBM Fast–Gaggia	
14	Annunzio Colombo	Italy	CBM Fast–Gaggia	
15	Corrado Donadio	Italy	CBM Fast–Gaggia	
16	Renato Laghi	Italy	CBM Fast–Gaggia	
17	Alfonso Dal Pian	Italy	CBM Fast–Gaggia	
18	Angelo Tosoni	Italy	CBM Fast–Gaggia	
19	Roberto Visentini	Italy	CBM Fast–Gaggia	
20	Bruno Zanoni	Italy	CBM Fast–Gaggia	
21	Dirk Baert	Belgium	Carlos–Galli Castelli–GBC	
22	Bruno Vicino	Italy	Carlos–Galli Castelli–GBC	
23	Shane Bartley	Australia	Carlos–Galli Castelli–GBC	
24	Finn Clausen	Denmark	Carlos–Galli Castelli–GBC	
25	Louis Luyten	Belgium	Carlos–Galli Castelli–GBC	
26	Eugène Plet	France	Carlos–Galli Castelli–GBC	
27	Willem Thomas	Belgium	Carlos–Galli Castelli–GBC	
28	Urbain Van Der Flaas	Belgium	Carlos–Galli Castelli–GBC	
29	René Van Gils	Belgium	Carlos–Galli Castelli–GBC	
30	Dirk Vermeersch	Belgium	Carlos–Galli Castelli–GBC	
31	Roger De Vlaeminck	Belgium	Gis Gelati	
32	Carmelo Barone	Italy	Gis Gelati	
33	Leonardo Bevilacqua	Italy	Gis Gelati	
34	Ronny Bossant	Belgium	Gis Gelati	
35	Silvano Cervato	Italy	Gis Gelati	
36	Willy De Geest	Belgium	Gis Gelati	
37	Ronan De Meyer	Belgium	Gis Gelati	
38	Piero Falorni	Italy	Gis Gelati	
39	Giuseppe Passuello	Italy	Gis Gelati	
40	Antonio D'alonzo	Italy	Gis Gelati	
51	Bernt Johansson	Sweden	Magniflex–Famcucine	
52	Per Bausager	Denmark	Magniflex–Famcucine	
53	Roberto Ceruti	Italy	Magniflex–Famcucine	
54	Jean-Claude Fabbri	Italy	Magniflex–Famcucine	
55	Jørgen Marcussen	Denmark	Magniflex–Famcucine	
56	Ignazio Paleari	Italy	Magniflex–Famcucine	
57	Graziano Rossi	Italy	Magniflex–Famcucine	
58	Amilcare Sgalbazzi	Italy	Magniflex–Famcucine	
59	Giancarlo Tartoni	Italy	Magniflex–Famcucine	
60	Gino Tigli	Italy	Magniflex–Famcucine	
61	Mario Beccia	Italy	Mecap–Hoonved	
62	Giuliano Cazzolato	Italy	Mecap–Hoonved	
63	Vincenzo De Caro	Italy	Mecap–Hoonved	
64	Mario Fraccaro	Italy	Mecap–Hoonved	
65	Luciano Loro	Italy	Mecap–Hoonved	
66	Dante Morandi	Italy	Mecap–Hoonved	
67	Dino Porrini	Italy	Mecap–Hoonved	
68	Luciano Rossignoli	Italy	Mecap–Hoonved	
69	Sergio Santimaria	Italy	Mecap–Hoonved	
70	Roberto Sorlini	Italy	Mecap–Hoonved	
71	Alessio Antonini	Italy	San Giacomo–Mobilificio	
72	Fausto Bertoglio	Italy	San Giacomo–Mobilificio	
73	Cesare Cipollini	Italy	San Giacomo–Mobilificio	
74	Franco Conti	Italy	San Giacomo–Mobilificio	
75	Giuseppe Fatato	Italy	San Giacomo–Mobilificio	
76	Giuseppe Martinelli	Italy	San Giacomo–Mobilificio	
77	Francesco Masi	Italy	San Giacomo–Mobilificio	
78	Giuseppe Perletto	Italy	San Giacomo–Mobilificio	
79	Leone Pizzini	Italy	San Giacomo–Mobilificio	
80	Orlando Maini	Italy	San Giacomo–Mobilificio	
81	Gregor Braun	West Germany	Peugeot–Esso–Michelin	
82	Alan Van Heerden	South Africa	Peugeot–Esso–Michelin	
83	Yves Hézard	France	Peugeot–Esso–Michelin	
84	Michel Laurent	France	Peugeot–Esso–Michelin	
85	Roger Legeay	France	Peugeot–Esso–Michelin	
86	Patrick Perret	France	Peugeot–Esso–Michelin	
87	Guy Sibille	France	Peugeot–Esso–Michelin	
88	Bernard Thévenet	France	Peugeot–Esso–Michelin	
89	Marcel Tinazzi	France	Peugeot–Esso–Michelin	
90	Jean-Luc Vandenbroucke	Belgium	Peugeot–Esso–Michelin	
91	Francesco Moser	Italy	Sanson–Luxor TV–Campagnolo	
92	Claudio Bortolotto	Italy	Sanson–Luxor TV–Campagnolo	
93	Ronald De Witte	Belgium	Sanson–Luxor TV–Campagnolo	
94	Phil Edwards	Great Britain	Sanson–Luxor TV–Campagnolo	
95	Simone Fraccaro	Italy	Sanson–Luxor TV–Campagnolo	
96	Renato Marchetti	Italy	Sanson–Luxor TV–Campagnolo	
97	Palmiro Masciarelli	Italy	Sanson–Luxor TV–Campagnolo	
98	Marcello Osler	Italy	Sanson–Luxor TV–Campagnolo	
99	Wladimiro Panizza	Italy	Sanson–Luxor TV–Campagnolo	
100	Attilio Rota	Italy	Sanson–Luxor TV–Campagnolo	
101	Vittorio Algeri	Italy	Sapa Assicurazioni	
102	Marino Amadori	Italy	Sapa Assicurazioni	
103	Alessandro Bettoni	Italy	Sapa Assicurazioni	
104	Giancarlo Casiraghi	Italy	Sapa Assicurazioni	
105	Stefano D'arcangelo	Italy	Sapa Assicurazioni	
106	Walter Dusi	Italy	Sapa Assicurazioni	
107	Fiorenzo Favero	Italy	Sapa Assicurazioni	
108	Leonardo Natale	Italy	Sapa Assicurazioni	
109	Mario Noris	Italy	Sapa Assicurazioni	
110	Paolo Rosola	Italy	Sapa Assicurazioni	
111	Giuseppe Saronni	Italy	Scic–Bottecchia	
112	Arnaldo Caverzasi	Italy	Scic–Bottecchia	
113	Luciano Conati	Italy	Scic–Bottecchia	
114	Joseph Fuchs	Switzerland	Scic–Bottecchia	
115	Walter Riccomi	Italy	Scic–Bottecchia	
116	Enrico Paolini	Italy	Scic–Bottecchia	
117	Gabriele Landoni	Italy	Scic–Bottecchia	
118	Alfredo Chinetti	Italy	Scic–Bottecchia	
119	Armando Lora	Italy	Scic–Bottecchia	
120	Roy Schuiten	Netherlands	Scic–Bottecchia	
121	Gottfried Schmutz	Switzerland	Willora–Piz Buin–Bonanza	
122	Guido Amrhein	Switzerland	Willora–Piz Buin–Bonanza	
123	Hansjörg Aemisegger	Switzerland	Willora–Piz Buin–Bonanza	
124	Thierry Bolle	Switzerland	Willora–Piz Buin–Bonanza	
125	Beat Breu	Switzerland	Willora–Piz Buin–Bonanza	
126	Alex Frei	Switzerland	Willora–Piz Buin–Bonanza	
127	Guido Frei	Switzerland	Willora–Piz Buin–Bonanza	
128	Fridolin Keller	Switzerland	Willora–Piz Buin–Bonanza	
129	Erwin Lienhard	Switzerland	Willora–Piz Buin–Bonanza	
130	Josef Wehrli	Switzerland	Willora–Piz Buin–Bonanza	
141	Pierino Gavazzi	Italy	Zonca–Santini	
142	Giancarlo Bellini	Italy	Zonca–Santini	
143	Claudio Corti	Italy	Zonca–Santini	
144	Enrico Guadrini	Italy	Zonca–Santini	
145	Leonardo Mazzantini	Italy	Zonca–Santini	
146	Clyde Sefton	Australia	Zonca–Santini	
147	Piero Spinelli	Italy	Zonca–Santini	
148	Giancarlo Torelli	Italy	Zonca–Santini	
149	Ennio Vanotti	Italy	Zonca–Santini	
150	Bruno Wolfer	Switzerland	Zonca–Santini	
