= 1980 Giro d'Italia, Stage 12 to Stage 22 =

Cycling race stages

The 1980 Giro d'Italia was the 63rd edition of the Giro d'Italia, one of cycling's Grand Tours. The Giro began in Genoa, with a prologue individual time trial on 15 May, and Stage 12 occurred on 28 May with a stage from Villapiana Lido. The race finished in Milan on 7 June.

== Stage 12 ==
28 May 1980 — Villapiana Lido to Campi Salentina, 203 km (126 mi)

Stage 12 result

Rank	Rider	Team	Time
1	Yvon Bertin (FRA)	Renault–Gitane	5h 40' 29"
2	Francesco Moser (ITA)	Sanson–Campagnolo	s.t.
3	Giovanni Mantovani (ITA)	Hoonved–Bottecchia	s.t.
4	Giuseppe Martinelli (ITA)	San Giacomo	s.t.
5	Dante Morandi (ITA)	Hoonved–Bottecchia	s.t.
6	Graziano Salvietti (SUI)	Famcucine	s.t.
7	Nazzareno Berto (ITA)	Inoxpran	s.t.
8	Bernard Hinault (FRA)	Renault–Gitane	s.t.
9	Hans Hindelang (FRG)	Kondor	s.t.
10	Giuseppe Fatato (ITA)	Famcucine	s.t.

General classification after Stage 12

Rank	Rider	Team	Time
1	Roberto Visentini (ITA)	San Giacomo	56h 33' 20"
2	Silvano Contini (ITA)	Bianchi–Piaggio	+ 44"
3	Faustino Rupérez (ESP)	Zor–Vereco	+ 1' 22"
4	Wladimiro Panizza (ITA)	Gis Gelati	+ 1' 53"
5	Giovanni Battaglin (ITA)	Inoxpran	+ 2' 13"
6	Gottfried Schmutz (SUI)	Cilo–Aufina	+ 2' 56"
7	Bernard Hinault (FRA)	Renault–Gitane	+ 2' 58"
8	Knut Knudsen (NOR)	Bianchi–Piaggio	+ 3' 13"
9	Gianbattista Baronchelli (ITA)	Bianchi–Piaggio	+ 3' 46"
10	Francesco Moser (ITA)	Sanson–Campagnolo	+ 3' 47"

== Stage 13 ==
29 May 1980 — Campi Salentina to Barletta, 220 km (140 mi)

Stage 13 result

Rank	Rider	Team	Time
1	Giuseppe Saronni (ITA)	Gis Gelati	6h 22' 52"
2	Yvon Bertin (FRA)	Renault–Gitane	s.t.
3	Giuseppe Martinelli (ITA)	San Giacomo	s.t.
4	Pierino Gavazzi (ITA)	Magniflex–Olmo	s.t.
5	Giovanni Mantovani (ITA)	Hoonved–Bottecchia	s.t.
6	Francesco Moser (ITA)	Sanson–Campagnolo	s.t.
7	Dante Morandi (ITA)	Hoonved–Bottecchia	s.t.
8	Pierre-Raymond Villemiane (FRA)	Renault–Gitane	s.t.
9	Hans Hindelang (FRG)	Kondor	s.t.
10	Angelo Tosoni (ITA)	Famcucine	s.t.

General classification after Stage 13

Rank	Rider	Team	Time
1	Roberto Visentini (ITA)	San Giacomo	62h 56' 12"
2	Silvano Contini (ITA)	Bianchi–Piaggio	+ 44"
3	Faustino Rupérez (ESP)	Zor–Vereco	+ 1' 22"
4	Wladimiro Panizza (ITA)	Gis Gelati	+ 1' 53"
5	Giovanni Battaglin (ITA)	Inoxpran	+ 2' 13"
6	Gottfried Schmutz (SUI)	Cilo–Aufina	+ 2' 56"
7	Bernard Hinault (FRA)	Renault–Gitane	+ 2' 58"
8	Knut Knudsen (NOR)	Bianchi–Piaggio	+ 3' 13"
9	Gianbattista Baronchelli (ITA)	Bianchi–Piaggio	+ 3' 46"
10	Francesco Moser (ITA)	Sanson–Campagnolo	+ 3' 47"

== Stage 14 ==
30 May 1980 — Foggia to Roccaraso, 186 km (116 mi)

Stage 14 result

Rank	Rider	Team	Time
1	Bernard Hinault (FRA)	Renault–Gitane	5h 58' 15"
2	Wladimiro Panizza (ITA)	Gis Gelati	s.t.
3	Giuseppe Saronni (ITA)	Gis Gelati	+ 42"
4	Gianbattista Baronchelli (ITA)	Bianchi–Piaggio	s.t.
5	Tommy Prim (SWE)	Bianchi–Piaggio	+ 51"
6	Francesco Moser (ITA)	Sanson–Campagnolo	+ 1' 36"
7	Joseph Fuchs (SUI)	Gis Gelati	+ 2' 03"
8	Leonardo Natale (ITA)	Magniflex–Olmo	+ 2' 13"
9	Jean-René Bernaudeau (FRA)	Renault–Gitane	+ 2' 18"
10	Roberto Ceruti (ITA)	Gis Gelati	s.t.

General classification after Stage 14

Rank	Rider	Team	Time
1	Wladimiro Panizza (ITA)	Gis Gelati	68h 56' 20"
2	Bernard Hinault (FRA)	Renault–Gitane	+ 1' 05"
3	Faustino Rupérez (ESP)	Zor–Vereco	+ 1' 49"
4	Gianbattista Baronchelli (ITA)	Bianchi–Piaggio	+ 2' 35"
5	Giovanni Battaglin (ITA)	Inoxpran	+ 2' 40"
6	Francesco Moser (ITA)	Sanson–Campagnolo	+ 3' 30"
7	Roberto Visentini (ITA)	San Giacomo	+ 4' 20"
8	Tommy Prim (SWE)	Bianchi–Piaggio	+ 4' 24"
9	Giuseppe Saronni (ITA)	Gis Gelati	+ 5' 01"
10	Gottfried Schmutz (SUI)	Cilo–Aufina	+ 5' 23"

== Stage 15 ==
31 May 1980 — Roccaraso to Teramo, 194 km (121 mi)

Stage 15 result

Rank	Rider	Team	Time
1	Tommy Prim (SWE)	Bianchi–Piaggio	5h 30' 52"
2	Juan Fernández (ESP)	Zor–Vereco	s.t.
3	Giovanni Mantovani (ITA)	Hoonved–Bottecchia	s.t.
4	Giuseppe Saronni (ITA)	Gis Gelati	s.t.
5	Gianbattista Baronchelli (ITA)	Bianchi–Piaggio	s.t.
6	Giuseppe Fatato (ITA)	Famcucine	s.t.
7	Leonardo Natale (ITA)	Magniflex–Olmo	s.t.
8	Alessandro Pozzi (ITA)	Bianchi–Piaggio	s.t.
9	Francesco Moser (ITA)	Sanson–Campagnolo	s.t.
10	Leonardo Mazzantini (ITA)	Sanson–Campagnolo	s.t.

General classification after Stage 15

Rank	Rider	Team	Time
1	Wladimiro Panizza (ITA)	Gis Gelati	74h 27' 22"
2	Bernard Hinault (FRA)	Renault–Gitane	+ 1' 05"
3	Faustino Rupérez (ESP)	Zor–Vereco	+ 1' 49"
4	Gianbattista Baronchelli (ITA)	Bianchi–Piaggio	+ 2' 35"
5	Giovanni Battaglin (ITA)	Inoxpran	+ 2' 40"
6	Francesco Moser (ITA)	Sanson–Campagnolo	+ 3' 30"
7	Tommy Prim (SWE)	Bianchi–Piaggio	+ 4' 14"
8	Roberto Visentini (ITA)	San Giacomo	+ 4' 20"
9	Giuseppe Saronni (ITA)	Gis Gelati	+ 5' 01"
10	Gottfried Schmutz (SUI)	Cilo–Aufina	+ 5' 23"

== Stage 16 ==
1 June 1980 — Giulianova to Gatteo a Mare, 229 km (142 mi)

Stage 16 result

Rank	Rider	Team	Time
1	Giuseppe Martinelli (ITA)	San Giacomo	6h 37' 01"
2	Giuseppe Saronni (ITA)	Gis Gelati	s.t.
3	Pierino Gavazzi (ITA)	Magniflex–Olmo	s.t.
4	Yvon Bertin (FRA)	Renault–Gitane	s.t.
5	Gregor Braun (FRG)	Sanson–Campagnolo	s.t.
6	Jean-René Bernaudeau (FRA)	Renault–Gitane	s.t.
7	Nazzareno Berto (ITA)	Inoxpran	s.t.
8	Dante Morandi (ITA)	Hoonved–Bottecchia	s.t.
9	Giovanni Mantovani (ITA)	Hoonved–Bottecchia	s.t.
10	Daniele Tinchella (ITA)	Kondor	s.t.

General classification after Stage 16

Rank	Rider	Team	Time
1	Wladimiro Panizza (ITA)	Gis Gelati	81h 04' 23"
2	Bernard Hinault (FRA)	Renault–Gitane	+ 1' 05"
3	Faustino Rupérez (ESP)	Zor–Vereco	+ 1' 49"
4	Gianbattista Baronchelli (ITA)	Bianchi–Piaggio	+ 2' 35"
5	Giovanni Battaglin (ITA)	Inoxpran	+ 2' 40"
6	Francesco Moser (ITA)	Sanson–Campagnolo	+ 3' 30"
7	Tommy Prim (SWE)	Bianchi–Piaggio	+ 4' 14"
8	Roberto Visentini (ITA)	San Giacomo	+ 4' 20"
9	Giuseppe Saronni (ITA)	Gis Gelati	+ 5' 01"
10	Gottfried Schmutz (SUI)	Cilo–Aufina	+ 5' 23"

== Stage 17 ==
2 June 1980 — Gatteo a Mare to Sirmione, 237 km (147 mi)

Stage 17 result

Rank	Rider	Team	Time
1	Giuseppe Saronni (ITA)	Gis Gelati	6h 38' 54"
2	Yvon Bertin (FRA)	Renault–Gitane	s.t.
3	Pierino Gavazzi (ITA)	Magniflex–Olmo	s.t.
4	Giovanni Mantovani (ITA)	Hoonved–Bottecchia	s.t.
5	Dante Morandi (ITA)	Hoonved–Bottecchia	s.t.
6	Daniele Tinchella (ITA)	Kondor	s.t.
7	Francesco Moser (ITA)	Sanson–Campagnolo	s.t.
8	Jean-René Bernaudeau (FRA)	Renault–Gitane	s.t.
9	Hans Hindelang (FRG)	Kondor	s.t.
10	Giuseppe Martinelli (ITA)	San Giacomo	s.t.

General classification after Stage 17

Rank	Rider	Team	Time
1	Wladimiro Panizza (ITA)	Gis Gelati	87h 43' 17"
2	Bernard Hinault (FRA)	Renault–Gitane	+ 1' 05"
3	Faustino Rupérez (ESP)	Zor–Vereco	+ 1' 49"
4	Gianbattista Baronchelli (ITA)	Bianchi–Piaggio	+ 2' 35"
5	Giovanni Battaglin (ITA)	Inoxpran	+ 2' 40"
6	Francesco Moser (ITA)	Sanson–Campagnolo	+ 3' 30"
7	Tommy Prim (SWE)	Bianchi–Piaggio	+ 4' 14"
8	Roberto Visentini (ITA)	San Giacomo	+ 4' 20"
9	Giuseppe Saronni (ITA)	Gis Gelati	+ 5' 01"
10	Gottfried Schmutz (SUI)	Cilo–Aufina	+ 5' 23"

== Stage 18 ==
3 June 1980 — Sirmione to Zoldo Alto, 239 km (149 mi)

Stage 18 result

Rank	Rider	Team	Time
1	Giovanni Battaglin (ITA)	Inoxpran	7h 03' 41"
2	Wladimiro Panizza (ITA)	Gis Gelati	+ 1' 15"
3	Tommy Prim (SWE)	Bianchi–Piaggio	s.t.
4	Bernard Hinault (FRA)	Renault–Gitane	+ 1' 18"
5	Leonardo Natale (ITA)	Magniflex–Olmo	+ 1' 40"
6	Giuseppe Saronni (ITA)	Gis Gelati	+ 1' 51"
7	Roberto Visentini (ITA)	San Giacomo	+ 1' 57"
8	Mario Beccia (ITA)	Hoonved–Bottecchia	+ 2' 08"
9	Joseph Fuchs (SUI)	Gis Gelati	+ 2' 32"
10	Francesco Moser (ITA)	Sanson–Campagnolo	+ 2' 49"

General classification after Stage 18

Rank	Rider	Team	Time
1	Wladimiro Panizza (ITA)	Gis Gelati	94h 48' 13"
2	Bernard Hinault (FRA)	Renault–Gitane	+ 1' 08"
3	Giovanni Battaglin (ITA)	Inoxpran	+ 1' 25"
4	Tommy Prim (SWE)	Bianchi–Piaggio	+ 4' 14"
5	Roberto Visentini (ITA)	San Giacomo	+ 5' 02"
6	Gianbattista Baronchelli (ITA)	Bianchi–Piaggio	+ 5' 11"
7	Giuseppe Saronni (ITA)	Gis Gelati	+ 5' 37"
8	Francesco Moser (ITA)	Sanson–Campagnolo	+ 6' 04"
9	Mario Beccia (ITA)	Hoonved–Bottecchia	+ 6' 22"
10	Gottfried Schmutz (SUI)	Cilo–Aufina	+ 7' 59"

== Stage 19 ==
4 June 1980 — Longarone to Cles, 241 km (150 mi)

Stage 19 result

Rank	Rider	Team	Time
1	Giuseppe Saronni (ITA)	Gis Gelati	7h 23' 18"
2	Bernard Hinault (FRA)	Renault–Gitane	s.t.
3	Wladimiro Panizza (ITA)	Gis Gelati	s.t.
4	Tommy Prim (SWE)	Bianchi–Piaggio	s.t.
5	Gianbattista Baronchelli (ITA)	Bianchi–Piaggio	s.t.
6	Giovanni Battaglin (ITA)	Inoxpran	s.t.
7	Mario Beccia (ITA)	Hoonved–Bottecchia	s.t.
8	Leonardo Natale (ITA)	Magniflex–Olmo	s.t.
9	Roberto Visentini (ITA)	San Giacomo	+ 5"
10	Joseph Fuchs (SUI)	Gis Gelati	+ 6"

General classification after Stage 19

Rank	Rider	Team	Time
1	Wladimiro Panizza (ITA)	Gis Gelati	102h 11' 31"
2	Bernard Hinault (FRA)	Renault–Gitane	+ 1' 08"
3	Giovanni Battaglin (ITA)	Inoxpran	+ 1' 25"
4	Tommy Prim (SWE)	Bianchi–Piaggio	+ 4' 14"
5	Roberto Visentini (ITA)	San Giacomo	+ 5' 07"
6	Gianbattista Baronchelli (ITA)	Bianchi–Piaggio	+ 5' 11"
7	Giuseppe Saronni (ITA)	Gis Gelati	+ 5' 37"
8	Mario Beccia (ITA)	Hoonved–Bottecchia	+ 6' 22"
9	Francesco Moser (ITA)	Sanson–Campagnolo	+ 7' 43"
10	Joseph Fuchs (SUI)	Gis Gelati	+ 8' 27"

== Stage 20 ==
5 June 1980 — Cles to Sondrio, 221 km (137 mi)

Stage 20 result

Rank	Rider	Team	Time
1	Jean-René Bernaudeau (FRA)	Renault–Gitane	6h 24' 24"
2	Bernard Hinault (FRA)	Renault–Gitane	+ 2"
3	Mario Beccia (ITA)	Hoonved–Bottecchia	+ 4' 22"
4	Tommy Prim (SWE)	Bianchi–Piaggio	+ 4' 24"
5	Giovanni Battaglin (ITA)	Inoxpran	s.t.
6	Gianbattista Baronchelli (ITA)	Bianchi–Piaggio	s.t.
7	Wladimiro Panizza (ITA)	Gis Gelati	s.t.
8	Leonardo Natale (ITA)	Magniflex–Olmo	s.t.
9	Giuseppe Fatato (ITA)	Famcucine	+ 8' 42"
10	Annunzio Colombo (ITA)	Famcucine	s.t.

General classification after Stage 20

Rank	Rider	Team	Time
1	Bernard Hinault (FRA)	Renault–Gitane	108h 37' 05"
2	Wladimiro Panizza (ITA)	Gis Gelati	+ 3' 14"
3	Giovanni Battaglin (ITA)	Inoxpran	+ 4' 39"
4	Tommy Prim (SWE)	Bianchi–Piaggio	+ 7' 28"
5	Gianbattista Baronchelli (ITA)	Bianchi–Piaggio	+ 8' 25"
6	Mario Beccia (ITA)	Hoonved–Bottecchia	+ 9' 34"
7	Giuseppe Saronni (ITA)	Gis Gelati	+ 13' 09"
8	Leonardo Natale (ITA)	Magniflex–Olmo	+ 15' 24"
9	Joseph Fuchs (SUI)	Gis Gelati	+ 15' 59"
10	Faustino Rupérez (ESP)	Zor–Vereco	+ 18' 05"

== Stage 21 ==
6 June 1980 — Saronno to Turbigo, 50.4 km (31.3 mi) (ITT)

Stage 21 result

Rank	Rider	Team	Time
1	Giuseppe Saronni (ITA)	Gis Gelati	1h 02' 32"
2	Gregor Braun (FRG)	Sanson–Campagnolo	+ 40"
3	Knut Knudsen (NOR)	Bianchi–Piaggio	+ 43"
4	Bernard Hinault (FRA)	Renault–Gitane	+ 46"
5	Tommy Prim (SWE)	Bianchi–Piaggio	+ 1' 11"
6	Roberto Visentini (ITA)	San Giacomo	+ 1' 55"
7	Giovanni Battaglin (ITA)	Inoxpran	+ 2' 04"
8	Jean-René Bernaudeau (FRA)	Renault–Gitane	+ 2' 41"
9	Hans Hindelang (FRG)	Kondor	+ 2' 54"
10	Wladimiro Panizza (ITA)	Gis Gelati	+ 3' 13"

General classification after Stage 21

Rank	Rider	Team	Time
1	Bernard Hinault (FRA)	Renault–Gitane	109h 40' 23"
2	Wladimiro Panizza (ITA)	Gis Gelati	+ 5' 43"
3	Giovanni Battaglin (ITA)	Inoxpran	+ 5' 57"
4	Tommy Prim (SWE)	Bianchi–Piaggio	+ 7' 53"
5	Gianbattista Baronchelli (ITA)	Bianchi–Piaggio	+ 11' 43"
6	Mario Beccia (ITA)	Hoonved–Bottecchia	+ 12' 47"
7	Giuseppe Saronni (ITA)	Gis Gelati	+ 12' 53"
8	Joseph Fuchs (SUI)	Gis Gelati	+ 20' 26"
9	Roberto Visentini (ITA)	San Giacomo	+ 20' 37"
10	Leonardo Natale (ITA)	Magniflex–Olmo	+ 21' 30"

== Stage 22 ==
7 June 1980 — Milan to Milan, 114 km (71 mi)

Stage 22 result

Rank	Rider	Team	Time
1	Pierino Gavazzi (ITA)	Magniflex–Olmo	2h 27' 57"
2	Tommy Prim (SWE)	Bianchi–Piaggio	s.t.
3	Giuseppe Martinelli (ITA)	San Giacomo	s.t.
4	Alfredo Chinetti (ITA)	Inoxpran	s.t.
5	Daniele Tinchella (ITA)	Kondor	s.t.
6	Giovanni Mantovani (ITA)	Hoonved–Bottecchia	s.t.
7	Angelo Tosoni (ITA)	Famcucine	s.t.
8	Yvon Bertin (FRA)	Renault–Gitane	s.t.
9	Jean-René Bernaudeau (FRA)	Renault–Gitane	s.t.
10	Ignazio Paleari (ITA)	Magniflex–Olmo	s.t.

General classification after Stage 22

Rank	Rider	Team	Time
1	Bernard Hinault (FRA)	Renault–Gitane	112h 08' 20"
2	Wladimiro Panizza (ITA)	Gis Gelati	+ 5' 43"
3	Giovanni Battaglin (ITA)	Inoxpran	+ 6' 03"
4	Tommy Prim (SWE)	Bianchi–Piaggio	+ 7' 53"
5	Gianbattista Baronchelli (ITA)	Bianchi–Piaggio	+ 11' 49"
6	Mario Beccia (ITA)	Hoonved–Bottecchia	+ 12' 47"
7	Giuseppe Saronni (ITA)	Gis Gelati	+ 12' 53"
8	Joseph Fuchs (SUI)	Gis Gelati	+ 20' 26"
9	Roberto Visentini (ITA)	San Giacomo	+ 20' 37"
10	Leonardo Natale (ITA)	Magniflex–Olmo	+ 21' 30"
