= 1979 Giro d'Italia, Stage 10 to Stage 19 =

Cycling race stages

The 1979 Giro d'Italia was the 62nd edition of the Giro d'Italia, one of cycling's Grand Tours. The Giro began with a prologue individual time trial in Florence on 17 May, and Stage 10 occurred on 27 May with an individual time trial from Lerici. The race finished in Milan on 6 June.

== Stage 10 ==
27 May 1979 — Lerici to Portovenere, 25 km (16 mi) (ITT)

Stage 10 result

Rank	Rider	Team	Time
1	Knut Knudsen (NOR)	Bianchi–Faema	32' 34"
2	Giuseppe Saronni (ITA)	Scic–Bottecchia	+ 16"
3	Roberto Visentini (ITA)	CBM Fast–Gaggia	+ 40"
4	Michel Laurent (FRA)	Peugeot–Esso–Michelin	+ 52"
5	Roger De Vlaeminck (BEL)	Gis Gelati	+ 53"
6	Francesco Moser (ITA)	Sanson–Luxor TV–Campagnolo	+ 54"
7	Roy Schuiten (NED)	Scic–Bottecchia	+ 1' 02"
8	Gregor Braun (FRG)	Peugeot–Esso–Michelin	+ 1' 06"
9	Silvano Contini (ITA)	Bianchi–Faema	+ 1' 09"
10	Bernt Johansson (SWE)	Magniflex–Famcucine	+ 1' 12"

General classification after Stage 10

Rank	Rider	Team	Time
1	Giuseppe Saronni (ITA)	Scic–Bottecchia	44h 50' 28"
2	Knut Knudsen (NOR)	Bianchi–Faema	+ 18"
3	Francesco Moser (ITA)	Sanson–Luxor TV–Campagnolo	+ 1' 40"
4	Michel Laurent (FRA)	Peugeot–Esso–Michelin	+ 3' 35"
5	Bernt Johansson (SWE)	Magniflex–Famcucine	+ 4' 00"
6	Mario Beccia (ITA)	Mecap–Hoonved	+ 4' 43"
7	Silvano Contini (ITA)	Bianchi–Faema	+ 6' 17"
8	Fausto Bertoglio (ITA)	San Giacomo–Mobilificio	+ 7' 43"
9	Joseph Fuchs (SUI)	Scic–Bottecchia	+ 9' 04"
10	Gottfried Schmutz (SUI)	Willora–Piz Buin–Bonanza	+ 10' 51"

== Stage 11 ==
28 May 1979 — La Spezia to Voghera, 212 km (132 mi)

Stage 11 result

Rank	Rider	Team	Time
1	Bernt Johansson (SWE)	Magniflex–Famcucine	6h 03' 45"
2	Silvano Contini (ITA)	Bianchi–Faema	s.t.
3	Gottfried Schmutz (SUI)	Willora–Piz Buin–Bonanza	s.t.
4	Giuseppe Perletto (ITA)	San Giacomo–Mobilificio	+ 11"
5	Francesco Moser (ITA)	Sanson–Luxor TV–Campagnolo	s.t.
6	Fausto Bertoglio (ITA)	San Giacomo–Mobilificio	s.t.
7	Joseph Fuchs (SUI)	Scic–Bottecchia	s.t.
8	Bruno Wolfer (SUI)	Zonca–Santini	s.t.
9	Marino Amadori (ITA)	Sapa Assicurazioni	s.t.
10	Amilcare Sgalbazzi (ITA)	Magniflex–Famcucine	s.t.

General classification after Stage 11

Rank	Rider	Team	Time
1	Giuseppe Saronni (ITA)	Scic–Bottecchia	50h 54' 24"
2	Knut Knudsen (NOR)	Bianchi–Faema	+ 18"
3	Francesco Moser (ITA)	Sanson–Luxor TV–Campagnolo	+ 1' 40"
4	Michel Laurent (FRA)	Peugeot–Esso–Michelin	+ 3' 35"
5	Bernt Johansson (SWE)	Magniflex–Famcucine	+ 3' 49"
6	Mario Beccia (ITA)	Mecap–Hoonved	+ 4' 43"
7	Silvano Contini (ITA)	Bianchi–Faema	+ 6' 06"
8	Fausto Bertoglio (ITA)	San Giacomo–Mobilificio	+ 7' 43"
9	Joseph Fuchs (SUI)	Scic–Bottecchia	+ 9' 04"
10	Gottfried Schmutz (SUI)	Willora–Piz Buin–Bonanza	+ 10' 57"

== Stage 12 ==
29 May 1979 — Alessandria to Saint-Vincent, 204 km (127 mi)

Stage 12 result

Rank	Rider	Team	Time
1	Roger De Vlaeminck (BEL)	Gis Gelati	5h 17' 31"
2	Giuseppe Saronni (ITA)	Scic–Bottecchia	+ 3"
3	Francesco Moser (ITA)	Sanson–Luxor TV–Campagnolo	s.t.
4	Pierino Gavazzi (ITA)	Zonca–Santini	s.t.
5	Vittorio Algeri (ITA)	Sapa Assicurazioni	s.t.
6	Claudio Bortolotto (ITA)	Sanson–Luxor TV–Campagnolo	s.t.
7	Knut Knudsen (NOR)	Bianchi–Faema	s.t.
8	Bruno Wolfer (SUI)	Zonca–Santini	s.t.
9	Roberto Ceruti (ITA)	Magniflex–Famcucine	s.t.
10	Bernt Johansson (SWE)	Magniflex–Famcucine	s.t.

General classification after Stage 12

Rank	Rider	Team	Time
1	Giuseppe Saronni (ITA)	Scic–Bottecchia	58h 11' 58"
2	Knut Knudsen (NOR)	Bianchi–Faema	+ 18"
3	Francesco Moser (ITA)	Sanson–Luxor TV–Campagnolo	+ 1' 40"
4	Michel Laurent (FRA)	Peugeot–Esso–Michelin	+ 3' 35"
5	Bernt Johansson (SWE)	Magniflex–Famcucine	+ 3' 49"
6	Silvano Contini (ITA)	Bianchi–Faema	+ 5' 06"
7	Mario Beccia (ITA)	Mecap–Hoonved	+ 5' 17"
8	Fausto Bertoglio (ITA)	San Giacomo–Mobilificio	+ 7' 52"
9	Joseph Fuchs (SUI)	Scic–Bottecchia	+ 9' 04"
10	Gottfried Schmutz (SUI)	Willora–Piz Buin–Bonanza	+ 10' 51"

== Stage 13 ==
30 May 1979 — Aosta to Meda, 229 km (142 mi)

Stage 13 result

Rank	Rider	Team	Time
1	Dino Porrini (ITA)	Mecap–Hoonved	5h 57' 42"
2	Claudio Bortolotto (ITA)	Sanson–Luxor TV–Campagnolo	s.t.
3	Josef Wehrli (SUI)	Willora–Piz Buin–Bonanza	s.t.
4	Pierino Gavazzi (ITA)	Zonca–Santini	+ 10"
5	Rik Van Linden (BEL)	Bianchi–Faema	s.t.
6	Luciano Borgognoni (ITA)	CBM Fast–Gaggia	s.t.
7	Ignazio Paleari (ITA)	Magniflex–Famcucine	s.t.
8	Giuseppe Martinelli (ITA)	San Giacomo–Mobilificio	s.t.
9	Carmelo Barone (ITA)	Gis Gelati	s.t.
10	Paolo Rosola (ITA)	Sapa Assicurazioni	s.t.

General classification after Stage 13

Rank	Rider	Team	Time
1	Giuseppe Saronni (ITA)	Scic–Bottecchia	62h 09' 50"
2	Knut Knudsen (NOR)	Bianchi–Faema	+ 18"
3	Francesco Moser (ITA)	Sanson–Luxor TV–Campagnolo	+ 1' 40"
4	Michel Laurent (FRA)	Peugeot–Esso–Michelin	+ 3' 35"
5	Bernt Johansson (SWE)	Magniflex–Famcucine	+ 3' 49"
6	Silvano Contini (ITA)	Bianchi–Faema	+ 5' 06"
7	Mario Beccia (ITA)	Mecap–Hoonved	+ 5' 17"
8	Fausto Bertoglio (ITA)	San Giacomo–Mobilificio	+ 8' 39"
9	Joseph Fuchs (SUI)	Scic–Bottecchia	+ 9' 04"
10	Gottfried Schmutz (SUI)	Willora–Piz Buin–Bonanza	+ 10' 57"

== Stage 14 ==
31 May 1979 — Meda to Bosco Chiesanuova, 212 km (132 mi)

Stage 14 result

Rank	Rider	Team	Time
1	Bernt Johansson (SWE)	Magniflex–Famcucine	6h 07' 15"
2	Francesco Moser (ITA)	Sanson–Luxor TV–Campagnolo	+ 2"
3	Knut Knudsen (NOR)	Bianchi–Faema	+ 3"
4	Giuseppe Saronni (ITA)	Scic–Bottecchia	s.t.
5	Gottfried Schmutz (SUI)	Willora–Piz Buin–Bonanza	s.t.
6	Wladimiro Panizza (ITA)	Sanson–Luxor TV–Campagnolo	s.t.
7	Michel Laurent (FRA)	Peugeot–Esso–Michelin	s.t.
8	Amilcare Sgalbazzi (ITA)	Magniflex–Famcucine	s.t.
9	Mario Beccia (ITA)	Mecap–Hoonved	s.t.
10	Erwin Lienhard (SUI)	Willora–Piz Buin–Bonanza	s.t.

General classification after Stage 14

Rank	Rider	Team	Time
1	Giuseppe Saronni (ITA)	Scic–Bottecchia	68h 17' 08"
2	Knut Knudsen (NOR)	Bianchi–Faema	+ 18"
3	Francesco Moser (ITA)	Sanson–Luxor TV–Campagnolo	+ 1' 39"
4	Michel Laurent (FRA)	Peugeot–Esso–Michelin	+ 3' 35"
5	Bernt Johansson (SWE)	Magniflex–Famcucine	+ 3' 46"
6	Silvano Contini (ITA)	Bianchi–Faema	+ 5' 06"
7	Mario Beccia (ITA)	Mecap–Hoonved	+ 5' 17"
8	Fausto Bertoglio (ITA)	San Giacomo–Mobilificio	+ 8' 39"
9	Joseph Fuchs (SUI)	Scic–Bottecchia	+ 9' 25"
10	Gottfried Schmutz (SUI)	Willora–Piz Buin–Bonanza	+ 10' 51"

== Stage 15 ==
1 June 1979 — Verona to Treviso, 121 km (75 mi)

Stage 15 result

Rank	Rider	Team	Time
1	Giuseppe Martinelli (ITA)	San Giacomo–Mobilificio	2h 50' 54"
2	Pierino Gavazzi (ITA)	Zonca–Santini	s.t.
3	Willem Thomas (BEL)	Carlos–Galli–G.B.C.–Castelli	s.t.
4	Paolo Rosola (ITA)	Sapa Assicurazioni	s.t.
5	Dino Porrini (ITA)	Mecap–Hoonved	s.t.
6	Carmelo Barone (ITA)	Gis Gelati	s.t.
7	Alessandro Bettoni (ITA)	Sapa Assicurazioni	s.t.
8	Francesco Moser (ITA)	Sanson–Luxor TV–Campagnolo	s.t.
9	Ignazio Paleari (ITA)	Magniflex–Famcucine	s.t.
10	Mario Noris (ITA)	Sapa Assicurazioni	s.t.

General classification after Stage 15

Rank	Rider	Team	Time
1	Giuseppe Saronni (ITA)	Scic–Bottecchia	71h 08' 02"
2	Knut Knudsen (NOR)	Bianchi–Faema	+ 18"
3	Francesco Moser (ITA)	Sanson–Luxor TV–Campagnolo	+ 1' 39"
4	Michel Laurent (FRA)	Peugeot–Esso–Michelin	+ 3' 35"
5	Bernt Johansson (SWE)	Magniflex–Famcucine	+ 3' 46"
6	Silvano Contini (ITA)	Bianchi–Faema	+ 5' 06"
7	Mario Beccia (ITA)	Mecap–Hoonved	+ 5' 17"
8	Fausto Bertoglio (ITA)	San Giacomo–Mobilificio	+ 8' 39"
9	Joseph Fuchs (SUI)	Scic–Bottecchia	+ 9' 25"
10	Gottfried Schmutz (SUI)	Willora–Piz Buin–Bonanza	+ 10' 51"

== Stage 16 ==
2 June 1979 — Treviso to Pieve di Cadore, 195 km (121 mi)

Stage 16 result

Rank	Rider	Team	Time
1	Roberto Ceruti (ITA)	Magniflex–Famcucine	5h 36' 19"
2	Giuseppe Saronni (ITA)	Scic–Bottecchia	+ 1' 12"
3	Francesco Moser (ITA)	Sanson–Luxor TV–Campagnolo	+ 1' 18"
4	Mario Beccia (ITA)	Mecap–Hoonved	+ 1' 22"
5	Bruno Wolfer (SUI)	Zonca–Santini	s.t.
6	Bernt Johansson (SWE)	Magniflex–Famcucine	s.t.
7	Joseph Fuchs (SUI)	Scic–Bottecchia	+ 1' 26"
8	Wladimiro Panizza (ITA)	Sanson–Luxor TV–Campagnolo	+ 1' 27"
9	Claudio Bortolotto (ITA)	Sanson–Luxor TV–Campagnolo	+ 1' 32"
10	Leonardo Natale (ITA)	Sapa Assicurazioni	+ 1' 33"

General classification after Stage 16

Rank	Rider	Team	Time
1	Giuseppe Saronni (ITA)	Scic–Bottecchia	76h 45' 33"
2	Knut Knudsen (NOR)	Bianchi–Faema	+ 44"
3	Francesco Moser (ITA)	Sanson–Luxor TV–Campagnolo	+ 1' 45"
4	Bernt Johansson (SWE)	Magniflex–Famcucine	+ 3' 56"
5	Michel Laurent (FRA)	Peugeot–Esso–Michelin	+ 4' 01"
6	Mario Beccia (ITA)	Mecap–Hoonved	+ 5' 27"
7	Silvano Contini (ITA)	Bianchi–Faema	+ 5' 32"
8	Fausto Bertoglio (ITA)	San Giacomo–Mobilificio	+ 9' 05"
9	Joseph Fuchs (SUI)	Scic–Bottecchia	+ 9' 39"
10	Gottfried Schmutz (SUI)	Willora–Piz Buin–Bonanza	+ 11' 17"

== Rest day ==
3 June 1979 The rest day on 3 June 1979 followed Stage 16 in Pieve di Cadore, where riders recovered ahead of the final mountain stages. This location in the Dolomites provided teams an opportunity to strategize for the remaining challenges in the race.

== Stage 17 ==
4 June 1979 — Pieve di Cadore to Trento, 194 km (121 mi)

Stage 17 result

Rank	Rider	Team	Time
1	Francesco Moser (ITA)	Sanson–Luxor TV–Campagnolo	4h 45' 38"
2	Silvano Contini (ITA)	Bianchi–Faema	s.t.
3	Marcel Tinazzi (FRA)	Peugeot–Esso–Michelin	s.t.
4	Bruno Wolfer (SUI)	Zonca–Santini	s.t.
5	Gottfried Schmutz (SUI)	Willora–Piz Buin–Bonanza	s.t.
6	Beat Breu (SUI)	Willora–Piz Buin–Bonanza	s.t.
7	Giuseppe Saronni (ITA)	Scic–Bottecchia	s.t.
8	Bernt Johansson (SWE)	Magniflex–Famcucine	s.t.
9	Marino Amadori (ITA)	Sapa Assicurazioni	s.t.
10	Leonardo Natale (ITA)	Sapa Assicurazioni	s.t.

General classification after Stage 17

Rank	Rider	Team	Time
1	Giuseppe Saronni (ITA)	Scic–Bottecchia	81h 31' 11"
2	Francesco Moser (ITA)	Sanson–Luxor TV–Campagnolo	+ 1' 45"
3	Bernt Johansson (SWE)	Magniflex–Famcucine	+ 3' 50"
4	Michel Laurent (FRA)	Peugeot–Esso–Michelin	+ 4' 01"
5	Mario Beccia (ITA)	Mecap–Hoonved	+ 5' 30"
6	Silvano Contini (ITA)	Bianchi–Faema	+ 5' 32"
7	Fausto Bertoglio (ITA)	San Giacomo–Mobilificio	+ 9' 05"
8	Joseph Fuchs (SUI)	Scic–Bottecchia	+ 9' 39"
9	Gottfried Schmutz (SUI)	Willora–Piz Buin–Bonanza	+ 11' 17"
10	Marino Amadori (ITA)	Sapa Assicurazioni	+ 14' 18"

== Stage 18 ==
5 June 1979 — Trento to Barzio, 245 km (152 mi)

Stage 18 result

Rank	Rider	Team	Time
1	Amilcare Sgalbazzi (ITA)	Magniflex–Famcucine	7h 04' 43"
2	Alfredo Chinetti (ITA)	Scic–Bottecchia	+ 23"
3	Wladimiro Panizza (ITA)	Sanson–Luxor TV–Campagnolo	s.t.
4	Erwin Lienhard (SUI)	Willora–Piz Buin–Bonanza	+ 25"
5	Giuseppe Saronni (ITA)	Scic–Bottecchia	s.t.
6	Fausto Bertoglio (ITA)	San Giacomo–Mobilificio	+ 26"
7	Johan De Muynck (BEL)	Bianchi–Faema	+ 28"
8	Francesco Moser (ITA)	Sanson–Luxor TV–Campagnolo	s.t.
9	Mario Beccia (ITA)	Mecap–Hoonved	+ 31"
10	Roberto Visentini (ITA)	CBM Fast–Gaggia	+ 36"

General classification after Stage 18

Rank	Rider	Team	Time
1	Giuseppe Saronni (ITA)	Scic–Bottecchia	88h 36' 19"
2	Francesco Moser (ITA)	Sanson–Luxor TV–Campagnolo	+ 1' 48"
3	Bernt Johansson (SWE)	Magniflex–Famcucine	+ 4' 07"
4	Michel Laurent (FRA)	Peugeot–Esso–Michelin	+ 4' 14"
5	Mario Beccia (ITA)	Mecap–Hoonved	+ 5' 33"
6	Silvano Contini (ITA)	Bianchi–Faema	+ 5' 43"
7	Fausto Bertoglio (ITA)	San Giacomo–Mobilificio	+ 9' 06"
8	Joseph Fuchs (SUI)	Scic–Bottecchia	+ 9' 50"
9	Gottfried Schmutz (SUI)	Willora–Piz Buin–Bonanza	+ 11' 28"
10	Marino Amadori (ITA)	Sapa Assicurazioni	+ 14' 40"

== Stage 19 ==
6 June 1979 — Cesano Maderno to Milan, 44 km (27 mi) (ITT)

Stage 19 result

Rank	Rider	Team	Time
1	Giuseppe Saronni (ITA)	Scic–Bottecchia	52' 59"
2	Roberto Visentini (ITA)	CBM Fast–Gaggia	+ 15"
3	Francesco Moser (ITA)	Sanson–Luxor TV–Campagnolo	+ 21"
4	Gregor Braun (FRG)	Peugeot–Esso–Michelin	+ 40"
5	Bernt Johansson (SWE)	Magniflex–Famcucine	+ 1' 06"
6	Michel Laurent (FRA)	Peugeot–Esso–Michelin	+ 1' 17"
7	Roy Schuiten (NED)	Scic–Bottecchia	+ 1' 34"
8	Silvano Contini (ITA)	Bianchi–Faema	+ 1' 40"
9	Mario Beccia (ITA)	Mecap–Hoonved	+ 2' 17"
10	Fausto Bertoglio (ITA)	San Giacomo–Mobilificio	+ 2' 21"

General classification after Stage 19

Rank	Rider	Team	Time
1	Giuseppe Saronni (ITA)	Scic–Bottecchia	89h 29' 18"
2	Francesco Moser (ITA)	Sanson–Luxor TV–Campagnolo	+ 2' 09"
3	Bernt Johansson (SWE)	Magniflex–Famcucine	+ 5' 13"
4	Michel Laurent (FRA)	Peugeot–Esso–Michelin	+ 5' 31"
5	Silvano Contini (ITA)	Bianchi–Faema	+ 7' 33"
6	Mario Beccia (ITA)	Mecap–Hoonved	+ 7' 50"
7	Fausto Bertoglio (ITA)	San Giacomo–Mobilificio	+ 11' 27"
8	Joseph Fuchs (SUI)	Scic–Bottecchia	+ 13' 07"
9	Gottfried Schmutz (SUI)	Willora–Piz Buin–Bonanza	+ 14' 16"
10	Roberto Visentini (ITA)	CBM Fast–Gaggia	+ 16' 11"
