= 1981 Giro d'Italia, Prologue to Stage 10 =

Cycling race stages

The 1981 Giro d'Italia was the 64th edition of the Giro d'Italia, one of cycling's Grand Tours. The Giro began in Trieste, with a prologue individual time trial on 13 May, and Stage 10 occurred on 25 May with a stage to Cascia. The race finished in Verona on 7 June.

== Prologue ==
13 May 1981 — Trieste, 6.6 km (4.1 mi) (ITT)

Prologue result and general classification after Prologue

Rank	Rider	Team	Time
1	Knut Knudsen (NOR)	Bianchi–Piaggio	7' 46"
2	Francesco Moser (ITA)	Famcucine–Campagnolo	+ 1"
3	Gregor Braun (FRG)	Famcucine–Campagnolo	+ 5"
4	Daniel Gisiger (SUI)	Cilo–Aufina	+ 9"
5	Giuseppe Saronni (ITA)	Gis Gelati–Campagnolo	s.t.
6	Claudio Torelli (ITA)	Famcucine–Campagnolo	+ 13"
7	Dietrich Thurau (FRG)	Kotter's–GBC	s.t.
8	Silvano Contini (ITA)	Bianchi–Piaggio	+ 14"
9	Roberto Visentini (ITA)	Sammontana–Benotto	+ 15"
10	Tommy Prim (SWE)	Bianchi–Piaggio	+ 16"

== Stage 1a ==
14 May 1981 — Trieste to Bibione, 100 km (62 mi)

Stage 1a result

Rank	Rider	Team	Time
1	Guido Bontempi (ITA)	Inoxpran	2h 25' 16"
2	Giovanni Mantovani (ITA)	Hoonved–Bottecchia–Herdal	s.t.
3	Pierino Gavazzi (ITA)	Magniflex–Olmo	s.t.

General classification after Stage 1a

Rank	Rider	Team	Time
1	Guido Bontempi (ITA)	Inoxpran	

== Stage 1b ==
14 May 1981 — Lignano Sabbiadoro to Bibione, 15 km (9.3 mi) (TTT)

Stage 1b result

Rank	Team	Time
1	Hoonved–Bottecchia–Herdal	17' 33"
2	Famcucine–Campagnolo	+ 2"
3	Cilo–Aufina	+ 3"
4	Sammontana–Benotto	+ 10"
5	Inoxpran	+ 19"
6	Santini–Selle Italia	+ 22"
7	Gis Gelati–Campagnolo	+ 23"
8	Kotter's–GBC	s.t.
9	Magniflex–Olmo	+ 30"
10	Bianchi–Piaggio	+ 36"

General classification after Stage 1b

Rank	Rider	Team	Time
1	Francesco Moser (ITA)	Famcucine–Campagnolo	2h 51' 09"
2	Gregor Braun (FRG)	Famcucine–Campagnolo	+ 4"
3	Daniel Gisiger (SUI)	Cilo–Aufina	+ 6"
4	Claudio Torelli (ITA)	Famcucine–Campagnolo	+ 12"
5	Guido Bontempi (ITA)	Inoxpran	+ 14"
6	Stefan Mutter (SUI)	Cilo–Aufina	+ 17"
7	Josef Fuchs (SUI)	Cilo–Aufina	+ 19"
8	Dante Morandi (ITA)	Famcucine–Campagnolo	s.t.
9	Ueli Sutter (SUI)	Cilo–Aufina	+ 20"
10	Roberto Visentini (ITA)	Sammontana–Benotto	+ 21"

== Stage 2 ==
15 May 1981 — Bibione to Ferrara, 211 km (131 mi)

Stage 2 result

Rank	Rider	Team	Time
1	Paolo Rosola (ITA)	Magniflex–Olmo	5h 14' 10"
2	Gregor Braun (FRG)	Famcucine–Campagnolo	s.t.
3	Dante Morandi (ITA)	Famcucine–Campagnolo	s.t.
4	Giovanni Mantovani (ITA)	Hoonved–Bottecchia–Herdal	s.t.
5	Jean-Philippe Vandenbrande (BEL)	Safir–Ludo–Galli	s.t.
6	John Trevorrow (AUS)	Safir–Ludo–Galli	s.t.
7	Alessio Antonini (ITA)	Santini–Selle Italia	s.t.
8	Flavio Zappi (ITA)	Hoonved–Bottecchia–Herdal	s.t.
9	Giuseppe Saronni (ITA)	Gis Gelati–Campagnolo	s.t.
10	Beat Breu (SUI)	Cilo–Aufina	s.t.

General classification after Stage 2

Rank	Rider	Team	Time
1	Gregor Braun (FRG)	Famcucine–Campagnolo	8h 05' 03"
2	Francesco Moser (ITA)	Famcucine–Campagnolo	+ 16"
3	Daniel Gisiger (SUI)	Cilo–Aufina	+ 22"
4	Dante Morandi (ITA)	Famcucine–Campagnolo	+ 25"
5	Claudio Torelli (ITA)	Famcucine–Campagnolo	+ 28"
6	Guido Bontempi (ITA)	Inoxpran	+ 30"
7	Stefan Mutter (SUI)	Cilo–Aufina	+ 33"
8	Josef Fuchs (SUI)	Cilo–Aufina	+ 35"
9	Ueli Sutter (SUI)	Cilo–Aufina	+ 36"
10	Roberto Visentini (ITA)	Sammontana–Benotto	+ 37"

== Stage 3 ==
16 May 1981 — Bologna to Recanati, 255 km (158 mi)

Stage 3 result

Rank	Rider	Team	Time
1	Giuseppe Saronni (ITA)	Gis Gelati–Campagnolo	7h 10' 14"
2	Francesco Moser (ITA)	Famcucine–Campagnolo	s.t.
3	Giovanni Mantovani (ITA)	Hoonved–Bottecchia–Herdal	s.t.
4	Sergio Santimaria (ITA)	Selle San Marco–Gabrielli	s.t.
5	Claudio Corti (ITA)	Sammontana–Benotto	s.t.
6	Gottfried Schmutz (SUI)	Cilo–Aufina	s.t.
7	Serge Demierre (SUI)	Cilo–Aufina	s.t.
8	Tommy Prim (SWE)	Bianchi–Piaggio	s.t.
9	Silvano Contini (ITA)	Bianchi–Piaggio	s.t.
10	Antonio Bevilacqua (ITA)	Hoonved–Bottecchia–Herdal	s.t.

General classification after Stage 3

Rank	Rider	Team	Time
1	Francesco Moser (ITA)	Famcucine–Campagnolo	15h 15' 13"
2	Gregor Braun (FRG)	Famcucine–Campagnolo	+ 4"
3	Giuseppe Saronni (ITA)	Gis Gelati–Campagnolo	+ 16"
4	Daniel Gisiger (SUI)	Cilo–Aufina	+ 26"
5	Josef Fuchs (SUI)	Cilo–Aufina	+ 39"
6	Ueli Sutter (SUI)	Cilo–Aufina	+ 40"
7	Roberto Visentini (ITA)	Sammontana–Benotto	+ 41"
8	Luciano Borgognoni (ITA)	Hoonved–Bottecchia–Herdal	+ 42"
9	Giuseppe Faraca (ITA)	Hoonved–Bottecchia–Herdal	+ 44"
10	Giovanni Mantovani (ITA)	Hoonved–Bottecchia–Herdal	+ 47"

== Rest day 1 ==
17 May 1981

== Stage 4 ==
18 May 1981 — Recanati to Lanciano, 214 km (133 mi)

Stage 4 result

Rank	Rider	Team	Time
1	Mario Beccia (ITA)	Santini–Selle Italia	5h 50' 56"
2	Moreno Argentin (ITA)	Sammontana–Benotto	+ 3"
3	Gottfried Schmutz (SUI)	Cilo–Aufina	s.t.
4	Fiorenzo Aliverti (ITA)	Hoonved–Bottecchia–Herdal	s.t.
5	Pedro Muñoz (ESP)	Zor–Helios–Novostil	s.t.
6	Enrico Maestrelli (ITA)	Selle San Marco–Gabrielli	s.t.
7	Giuseppe Faraca (ITA)	Hoonved–Bottecchia–Herdal	+ 5"
8	Gianbattista Baronchelli (ITA)	Bianchi–Piaggio	s.t.
9	Serge Demierre (SUI)	Cilo–Aufina	+ 10"
10	Pierino Gavazzi (ITA)	Magniflex–Olmo	+ 12"

General classification after Stage 4

Rank	Rider	Team	Time
1	Francesco Moser (ITA)	Famcucine–Campagnolo	21h 06' 21"
2	Gregor Braun (FRG)	Famcucine–Campagnolo	+ 4"
3	Giuseppe Saronni (ITA)	Gis Gelati–Campagnolo	+ 16"
4	Gottfried Schmutz (SUI)	Cilo–Aufina	+ 32"
5	Giuseppe Faraca (ITA)	Hoonved–Bottecchia–Herdal	+ 37"
6	Josef Fuchs (SUI)	Cilo–Aufina	+ 39"
7	Ueli Sutter (SUI)	Cilo–Aufina	+ 40"
8	Roberto Visentini (ITA)	Sammontana–Benotto	+ 41"
9	Luciano Borgognoni (ITA)	Hoonved–Bottecchia–Herdal	+ 42"
10	Fiorenzo Aliverti (ITA)	Hoonved–Bottecchia–Herdal	s.t.

== Stage 5 ==
19 May 1981 — Marina di San Vito to Rodi Garganico, 180 km (110 mi)

Stage 5 result

Rank	Rider	Team	Time
1	Giuseppe Saronni (ITA)	Gis Gelati–Campagnolo	5h 02' 50"
2	Francesco Moser (ITA)	Famcucine–Campagnolo	s.t.
3	Serge Demierre (SUI)	Cilo–Aufina	s.t.
4	Gianbattista Baronchelli (ITA)	Bianchi–Piaggio	s.t.
5	Silvano Contini (ITA)	Bianchi–Piaggio	s.t.
6	Knut Knudsen (NOR)	Bianchi–Piaggio	s.t.
7	Claudio Torelli (ITA)	Famcucine–Campagnolo	s.t.
8	Leonardo Mazzantini (ITA)	Famcucine–Campagnolo	s.t.
9	Alfredo Chinetti (ITA)	Inoxpran	s.t.
10	Tommy Prim (SWE)	Bianchi–Piaggio	s.t.

General classification after Stage 5

Rank	Rider	Team	Time
1	Francesco Moser (ITA)	Famcucine–Campagnolo	26h 08' 51"
2	Giuseppe Saronni (ITA)	Gis Gelati–Campagnolo	+ 6"
3	Gregor Braun (FRG)	Famcucine–Campagnolo	+ 24"
4	Gottfried Schmutz (SUI)	Cilo–Aufina	+ 52"
5	Serge Demierre (SUI)	Cilo–Aufina	+ 56"
6	Josef Fuchs (SUI)	Cilo–Aufina	+ 59"
7	Roberto Visentini (ITA)	Sammontana–Benotto	+ 1' 01"
8	Fiorenzo Aliverti (ITA)	Hoonved–Bottecchia–Herdal	+ 1' 12"
9	Dietrich Thurau (FRG)	Kotter's–GBC	s.t.
10	Knut Knudsen (NOR)	Bianchi–Piaggio	s.t.

== Stage 6 ==
20 May 1981 — Rodi Garganico to Bari, 225 km (140 mi)

Stage 6 result

Rank	Rider	Team	Time
1	Giuseppe Saronni (ITA)	Gis Gelati–Campagnolo	6h 19' 00"
2	Peter Kehl (FRG)	Kotter's–GBC	s.t.
3	Paolo Rosola (ITA)	Magniflex–Olmo	s.t.
4	Benny Schepmans (BEL)	Safir–Ludo–Galli	s.t.
5	Stefan Mutter (SUI)	Cilo–Aufina	s.t.
6	Pierino Gavazzi (ITA)	Magniflex–Olmo	s.t.
7	Dietrich Thurau (FRG)	Kotter's–GBC	s.t.
8	Mario Noris (ITA)	Magniflex–Olmo	s.t.
9	Alberto Minetti (ITA)	Famcucine–Campagnolo	s.t.
10	Palmiro Masciarelli (ITA)	Famcucine–Campagnolo	s.t.

General classification after Stage 6

Rank	Rider	Team	Time
1	Giuseppe Saronni (ITA)	Gis Gelati–Campagnolo	32h 27' 27"
2	Francesco Moser (ITA)	Famcucine–Campagnolo	+ 24"
3	Gregor Braun (FRG)	Famcucine–Campagnolo	+ 48"
4	Gottfried Schmutz (SUI)	Cilo–Aufina	+ 1' 16"
5	Serge Demierre (SUI)	Cilo–Aufina	+ 1' 20"
6	Josef Fuchs (SUI)	Cilo–Aufina	+ 1' 23"
7	Roberto Visentini (ITA)	Sammontana–Benotto	+ 1' 25"
8	Fiorenzo Aliverti (ITA)	Hoonved–Bottecchia–Herdal	+ 1' 26"
9	Dietrich Thurau (FRG)	Kotter's–GBC	+ 1' 36"
10	Knut Knudsen (NOR)	Bianchi–Piaggio	s.t.

== Stage 7 ==
21 May 1981 — Bari to Potenza, 143 km (89 mi)

Stage 7 result

Rank	Rider	Team	Time
1	Palmiro Masciarelli (ITA)	Famcucine–Campagnolo	3h 48' 01"
2	Sergio Santimaria (ITA)	Selle San Marco–Gabrielli	s.t.
3	Claudio Bortolotto (ITA)	Santini–Selle Italia	s.t.
4	Wladimiro Panizza (ITA)	Gis Gelati–Campagnolo	s.t.
5	Alfio Vandi (ITA)	Selle San Marco–Gabrielli	s.t.
6	Luciano Loro (ITA)	Inoxpran	+ 4"
7	Beat Breu (SUI)	Cilo–Aufina	+ 6"
8	Pierino Gavazzi (ITA)	Magniflex–Olmo	+ 30"
9	Gianbattista Baronchelli (ITA)	Bianchi–Piaggio	s.t.
10	Serge Demierre (SUI)	Cilo–Aufina	s.t.

General classification after Stage 7

Rank	Rider	Team	Time
1	Giuseppe Saronni (ITA)	Gis Gelati–Campagnolo	36h 15' 58"
2	Francesco Moser (ITA)	Famcucine–Campagnolo	+ 24"
3	Gottfried Schmutz (SUI)	Cilo–Aufina	+ 1' 16"
4	Serge Demierre (SUI)	Cilo–Aufina	+ 1' 20"
5	Beat Breu (SUI)	Cilo–Aufina	+ 1' 21"
6	Josef Fuchs (SUI)	Cilo–Aufina	+ 1' 23"
7	Claudio Bortolotto (ITA)	Santini–Selle Italia	s.t.
8	Roberto Visentini (ITA)	Sammontana–Benotto	+ 1' 26"
9	Fiorenzo Aliverti (ITA)	Hoonved–Bottecchia–Herdal	s.t.
10	Wladimiro Panizza (ITA)	Gis Gelati–Campagnolo	+ 1' 33"

== Stage 8 ==
22 May 1981 — Sala Consilina to Cosenza, 202 km (126 mi)

Stage 8 result

Rank	Rider	Team	Time
1	Moreno Argentin (ITA)	Sammontana–Benotto	5h 23' 13"
2	Enrico Maestrelli (ITA)	Selle San Marco–Gabrielli	s.t.
3	Bruno Leali (ITA)	Inoxpran	s.t.
4	Pierino Gavazzi (ITA)	Magniflex–Olmo	+ 56"
5	Giovanni Mantovani (ITA)	Hoonved–Bottecchia–Herdal	s.t.
6	Giuseppe Martinelli (ITA)	Santini–Selle Italia	s.t.
7	Gianbattista Baronchelli (ITA)	Bianchi–Piaggio	s.t.
8	Serge Demierre (SUI)	Cilo–Aufina	s.t.
9	Dietrich Thurau (FRG)	Kotter's–GBC	s.t.
10	Giovanni Renosto (ITA)	Magniflex–Olmo	s.t.

General classification after Stage 8

Rank	Rider	Team	Time
1	Giuseppe Saronni (ITA)	Gis Gelati–Campagnolo	41h 40' 27"
2	Francesco Moser (ITA)	Famcucine–Campagnolo	+ 24"
3	Bruno Leali (ITA)	Inoxpran	+ 46"
4	Gottfried Schmutz (SUI)	Cilo–Aufina	+ 1' 16"
5	Serge Demierre (SUI)	Cilo–Aufina	+ 1' 20"
6	Beat Breu (SUI)	Cilo–Aufina	+ 1' 21"
7	Josef Fuchs (SUI)	Cilo–Aufina	+ 1' 23"
8	Claudio Bortolotto (ITA)	Santini–Selle Italia	s.t.
9	Roberto Visentini (ITA)	Sammontana–Benotto	+ 1' 25"
10	Fiorenzo Aliverti (ITA)	Hoonved–Bottecchia–Herdal	+ 1' 26"

== Stage 9 ==
23 May 1981 — Cosenza to Reggio Calabria, 230 km (140 mi)

Stage 9 result

Rank	Rider	Team	Time
1	Serge Parsani (ITA)	Bianchi–Piaggio	6h 40' 33"
2	Palmiro Masciarelli (ITA)	Famcucine–Campagnolo	s.t.
3	Serge Demierre (SUI)	Cilo–Aufina	s.t.
4	Giovanni Mantovani (ITA)	Hoonved–Bottecchia–Herdal	s.t.
5	Giuseppe Martinelli (ITA)	Santini–Selle Italia	s.t.
6	Giuseppe Saronni (ITA)	Gis Gelati–Campagnolo	s.t.
7	Dante Morandi (ITA)	Famcucine–Campagnolo	s.t.
8	Pierino Gavazzi (ITA)	Magniflex–Olmo	s.t.
9	Stefan Mutter (SUI)	Cilo–Aufina	s.t.
10	Dietrich Thurau (FRG)	Kotter's–GBC	s.t.

General classification after Stage 9

Rank	Rider	Team	Time
1	Giuseppe Saronni (ITA)	Gis Gelati–Campagnolo	48h 20' 42"
2	Francesco Moser (ITA)	Famcucine–Campagnolo	+ 24"
3	Bruno Leali (ITA)	Inoxpran	+ 46"
4	Serge Demierre (SUI)	Cilo–Aufina	+ 1' 10"
5	Gottfried Schmutz (SUI)	Cilo–Aufina	+ 1' 16"
6	Beat Breu (SUI)	Cilo–Aufina	+ 1' 21"
7	Josef Fuchs (SUI)	Cilo–Aufina	+ 1' 23"
8	Claudio Bortolotto (ITA)	Santini–Selle Italia	s.t.
9	Roberto Visentini (ITA)	Sammontana–Benotto	+ 1' 25"
10	Fiorenzo Aliverti (ITA)	Hoonved–Bottecchia–Herdal	+ 1' 26"

== Rest day 2 ==
24 May 1981

== Stage 10 ==
25 May 1981 — Rome to Cascia, 166 km (103 mi)

Stage 10 result

Rank	Rider	Team	Time
1	Gianbattista Baronchelli (ITA)	Bianchi–Piaggio	4h 43' 07"
2	Claudio Bortolotto (ITA)	Santini–Selle Italia	+ 3"
3	Silvano Contini (ITA)	Bianchi–Piaggio	s.t.
4	Alfio Vandi (ITA)	Selle San Marco–Gabrielli	+ 5"
5	Giovanni Battaglin (ITA)	Inoxpran	s.t.
6	Tommy Prim (SWE)	Bianchi–Piaggio	+ 7"
7	Mario Beccia (ITA)	Santini–Selle Italia	+ 51"
8	Josef Fuchs (SUI)	Cilo–Aufina	+ 54"
9	Giuseppe Saronni (ITA)	Gis Gelati–Campagnolo	s.t.
10	Wladimiro Panizza (ITA)	Gis Gelati–Campagnolo	s.t.

General classification after Stage 10

Rank	Rider	Team	Time
1	Giuseppe Saronni (ITA)	Gis Gelati–Campagnolo	53h 04' 43"
2	Claudio Bortolotto (ITA)	Santini–Selle Italia	+ 12"
3	Gianbattista Baronchelli (ITA)	Bianchi–Piaggio	+ 31"
4	Alfio Vandi (ITA)	Selle San Marco–Gabrielli	+ 49"
5	Silvano Contini (ITA)	Bianchi–Piaggio	s.t.
6	Giovanni Battaglin (ITA)	Inoxpran	+ 50"
7	Tommy Prim (SWE)	Bianchi–Piaggio	+ 1' 04"
8	Josef Fuchs (SUI)	Cilo–Aufina	+ 1' 23"
9	Roberto Visentini (ITA)	Sammontana–Benotto	+ 1' 32"
10	Beat Breu (SUI)	Cilo–Aufina	+ 1' 33"
