= 1980 Giro d'Italia =

Race details
- Dates: 15 May – 7 June 1980
- Stages: 22 + Prologue
- Distance: 4,025 km (2,501 mi)
- Winning time: 112h 08' 20"

Results
| Jersey awarded to the overall winner | Winner | Bernard Hinault (FRA) | (Renault–Gitane–Campagnolo) |
| | Second | Wladimiro Panizza (ITA) | (Gis Gelati) |
| | Third | Giovanni Battaglin (ITA) | (Inoxpran) |
| Jersey awarded to the points classification winner | Points | Giuseppe Saronni (ITA) | (Gis Gelati) |
| Jersey awarded to the mountains classification winner | Mountains | Claudio Bortolotto (ITA) | (Mobilifico San Giacomo–Benotto) |
| Jersey awarded to the youth classification winner | Youth | Tommy Prim (SWE) | (Bianchi–Piaggio) |
| | Combination | Bernard Hinault (FRA) | (Renault–Gitane–Campagnolo) |
| Jersey awarded to the sprints classification winner | Sprints | Fiorenzo Favero (ITA) | (Hoonved–Bottecchia) |
| | Team | Bianchi–Piaggio | |

The 1980 Giro d'Italia was the 63rd running of the Giro. It started in Genoa, on 15 May, with a 7 km (4.3 mi) prologue and concluded in Milan, on 8 June, with a 114 km (70.8 mi) mass-start stage. A total of 130 riders from thirteen teams entered the 22-stage race, that was won by Frenchman Bernard Hinault of the Renault–Gitane–Campagnolo team. The second and third places were taken by Italians Wladimiro Panizza and Giovanni Battaglin, respectively.

Amongst the other classifications that the race awarded, Gis Gelati's Giuseppe Saronni won the points classification, Claudio Bortolotto of Mobilifico San Giacomo–Benotto won the mountains classification, and Bianchi–Piaggio's Tommy Prim completed the Giro as the best rider aged 24 or under in the general classification, finishing fourth overall. Bianchi–Piaggio finishing as the winners of the team classification, ranking each of the twenty teams contesting the race by lowest cumulative time.

== Teams ==
A total of thirteen teams were invited to participate in the 1980 Giro d'Italia. The starting riders came from a total of 12 different countries; 73 riders were from Italy, while the remaining 57 riders came from: Switzerland (13), Spain (10), France (9), Belgium (8), Germany (6), the Netherlands (5), Sweden (2), Denmark (1), Great Britain (1), Luxembourg (1), and Norway (1). Each team sent a squad of ten riders, which meant that the race started with a peloton of 130 cyclists.

Of those starting, 46 were riding the Giro d'Italia for the first time. The average age of riders was 26.4 years, ranging from 21–year–old Guillermo de Le (Selle Italia–Zor–Vereco–Campagnolo) to 35–year–old Attilio Rota (Sanson–Campagnolo). The team with the youngest average rider age was Hoonved–Bottecchia (24), while the oldest was Sanson–Campagnolo (28). From the riders that began this edition, 89 made it to the finish in Milan.

The teams entering the race were:

- Gis Gelati
- Bianchi–Piaggio
- Cilo–Aufina
- Famcucine–Campagnolo
- Hoonved–Bottecchia
- Inoxpran
- Kondor
- Magniflex–Olmo
- Mobilifico San Giacomo–Benotto
- Renault–Gitane–Campagnolo
- Sanson–Campagnolo
- Selle Italia–Zor–Vereco–Campagnolo
- Studio Casa–Fin–Italcasa–Colnago

== Route and stages ==
The route for the 1980 edition of the Giro d'Italia was revealed to the public by head organizer Vincenzo Torriani on 31 January 1980. Covering a total of 4,025 km (2,501 mi), it included three individual time trials, and ten stages with categorized climbs that awarded mountains classification points. Four of these ten stages had summit finishes: stage 8, to Fiuggi; stage 11, to Campotenese; stage 14, to Roccaraso; and stage 18, to Zoldo Alto. In the case the Stelvio was not passable by bike, the nineteenth and twentieth stages had a back-up plan where that took an alternate route through the Pordoi Pass in stage nineteen and would be the new Cima Coppi. The organizers chose to include two rest days. When compared to the previous year's race, the race was 724 km (450 mi) longer and contained two less time trials. In addition, this race contained three more stages.

Stage results
| Stage | Date | Course | Distance | Type | Winner |
|---|---|---|---|---|---|
| P | 15 May | Genoa | 7 km (4 mi) | Individual time trial | (Italy) Francesco Moser |
| 1 | 16 May | Genova to Imperia | 123 km (76 mi) | Plain stage | Giuseppe Saronni (ITA) |
| 2 | 17 May | Imperia to Turin | 179 km (111 mi) | Stage with mountain(s) | Giuseppe Saronni (ITA) |
| 3 | 18 May | Turin to Parma | 243 km (151 mi) | Plain stage | Giuseppe Saronni (ITA) |
| 4 | 19 May | Parma to Marina di Pisa | 193 km (120 mi) | Stage with mountain(s) | Dante Morandi (ITA) |
| 5 | 20 May | Pontedera to Pisa | 36 km (22 mi) | Individual time trial | Jørgen Marcussen (DEN) |
| | 21 May | Rest day | | | |
| 6 | 22 May | Rio Marina to Portoferraio | 126 km (78 mi) | Plain stage | Carmelo Barone (ITA) |
| 7 | 23 May | Castiglione della Pescaia to Orvieto | 200 km (124 mi) | Stage with mountain(s) | Silvano Contini (ITA) |
| 8 | 24 May | Orvieto to Fiuggi | 216 km (134 mi) | Stage with mountain(s) | Juan Fernández Martín (ESP) |
| 9 | 25 May | Fiuggi to Sorrento | 247 km (153 mi) | Plain stage | Giovanni Mantovani (ITA) |
| 10 | 26 May | Sorrento to Palinuro | 177 km (110 mi) | Plain stage | Giovanni Mantovani (ITA) |
| 11 | 27 May | Palinuro to Campotenese | 145 km (90 mi) | Stage with mountain(s) | Gianbattista Baronchelli (ITA) |
| 12 | 28 May | Villapiana Lido to Campi Salentina | 203 km (126 mi) | Plain stage | Yvon Bertin (FRA) |
| 13 | 29 May | Campi Salentina to Barletta | 220 km (137 mi) | Plain stage | Giuseppe Saronni (ITA) |
| 14 | 30 May | Foggia to Roccaraso | 186 km (116 mi) | Stage with mountain(s) | Bernard Hinault (FRA) |
| 15 | 31 May | Roccaraso to Teramo | 194 km (121 mi) | Stage with mountain(s) | Tommy Prim (SWE) |
| 16 | 1 June | Giulianova to Gatteo a Mare | 229 km (142 mi) | Plain stage | Giuseppe Martinelli (ITA) |
| 17 | 2 June | Gatteo a Mare to Sirmione | 237 km (147 mi) | Plain stage | Giuseppe Saronni (ITA) |
| 18 | 3 June | Sirmione to Zoldo Alto | 239 km (149 mi) | Stage with mountain(s) | Giovanni Battaglin (ITA) |
| 19 | 4 June | Longarone to Cles | 241 km (150 mi) | Stage with mountain(s) | Giuseppe Saronni (ITA) |
| 20 | 5 June | Cles to Sondrio | 221 km (137 mi) | Stage with mountain(s) | Jean-René Bernaudeau (FRA) |
| 21 | 6 June | Saronno to Turbigo | 50 km (31 mi) | Individual time trial | Giuseppe Saronni (ITA) |
| 22 | 7 June | Milan to Milan | 114 km (71 mi) | Plain stage | Pierino Gavazzi (ITA) |
| | Total | | 4,025 km (2,501 mi) | | |

== Classification leadership ==
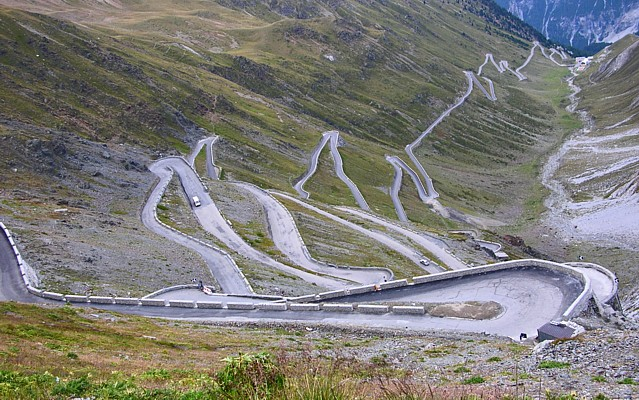
A sample of the 48 hairpin turns near the top of the eastern ramp of the Stelvio Pass, the Cima Coppi (highest elevation point) of the 1980 Giro.

Three different jerseys were worn during the 1980 Giro d'Italia. The leader of the general classification – calculated by adding the stage finish times of each rider, and allowing time bonuses for the first three finishers on mass-start stages – wore a pink jersey. This classification is the most important of the race, and its winner is considered as the winner of the Giro. There were no time bonuses in 1980.

The second classification was the points classification. Riders received points for finishing in the top positions in a stage finish, with first place getting the most points, and lower placings getting successively fewer points. The rider leading this classification wore a purple (or cyclamen) jersey.

The green jersey was awarded to the mountains classification leader. In this ranking, points were won by reaching the summit of a climb ahead of other cyclists. Each climb was ranked as either first, second or third category, with more points available for higher category climbs. The Cima Coppi, the race's highest point of elevation, awarded more points than the other first category climbs. The Cima Coppi for this Giro was the Stelvio Pass. The first rider to cross the Stelvio was French rider Jean-René Bernaudeau.

The white jersey was worn by the leader of young rider classification, a ranking decided the same way as the general classification, but considering only riders aged 24 and younger.

Although no jersey was awarded, there was also one classification for the teams, in which the stage finish times of the best three cyclists per team were added; the leading team was the one with the lowest total time.

There were other minor classifications within the race, including the Campionato delle Regioni classification. The leader wore a blue jersey with colored vertical stripes ("maglia azzurra con banda tricolore verticale"). This classification was the most important intermediate sprint classification in the Giro; the first three riders that crossed the intermediate sprint scored points.

The FIAT classification, created in the 1976 edition, was used again, but this year the winner received a Fiat Panda. For this classification, there was one intermediate sprint per stage, and the first three riders scored points.

The rows in the following table correspond to the jerseys awarded after that stage was run.

Classification leadership by stage
| Stage | Winner | General classification | Points classification | Mountains classification | Young rider classification | Campionato delle Regioni | FIAT | Team classification |
|---|---|---|---|---|---|---|---|---|
| P | Francesco Moser | Francesco Moser | Francesco Moser | not awarded | Tommy Prim | not awarded | not awarded | not awarded |
| 1 | Giuseppe Saronni | Francesco Moser | Francesco Moser | not awarded | Tommy Prim | ? | ? | Hoonved–Bottecchia |
| 2 | Giuseppe Saronni | Francesco Moser | Giuseppe Saronni | Claudio Bortolotto | Tommy Prim | ? | ? | Hoonved–Bottecchia |
| 3 | Giuseppe Saronni | Francesco Moser | Giuseppe Saronni | Claudio Bortolotto | Tommy Prim | ? | ? | Hoonved–Bottecchia |
| 4 | Dante Morandi | Francesco Moser | Giuseppe Saronni | Claudio Bortolotto | Tommy Prim | ? | ? | Hoonved–Bottecchia |
| 5 | Jørgen Marcussen | Bernard Hinault | Giuseppe Saronni | Claudio Bortolotto | Faustino Rupérez | ? | ? | Bianchi–Piaggio |
| 6 | Carmelo Barone | Bernard Hinault | Giuseppe Saronni | Claudio Bortolotto | Faustino Rupérez | ? | ? | Bianchi–Piaggio |
| 7 | Silvano Contini | Roberto Visentini | Giuseppe Saronni | Claudio Bortolotto | Faustino Rupérez | Fiorenzo Favero | ? | ? |
| 8 | Juan Fernández Martín | Roberto Visentini | Giuseppe Saronni | Claudio Bortolotto | Faustino Rupérez | ? | ? | ? |
| 9 | Giovanni Mantovani | Roberto Visentini | Giuseppe Saronni | Claudio Bortolotto | Faustino Rupérez | ? | ? | ? |
| 10 | Giovanni Mantovani | Roberto Visentini | Giovanni Mantovani | Claudio Bortolotto | Faustino Rupérez | ? | ? | Bianchi–Piaggio |
| 11 | Gianbattista Baronchelli | Roberto Visentini | Giovanni Mantovani | Claudio Bortolotto | Faustino Rupérez | Fiorenzo Favero | ? | Bianchi–Piaggio |
| 12 | Yvon Bertin | Roberto Visentini | Giovanni Mantovani | Claudio Bortolotto | Faustino Rupérez | Fiorenzo Favero | ? | Bianchi–Piaggio |
| 13 | Giuseppe Saronni | Roberto Visentini | Giovanni Mantovani | Claudio Bortolotto | Faustino Rupérez | Fiorenzo Favero | ? | Bianchi–Piaggio |
| 14 | Bernard Hinault | Wladimiro Panizza | Giuseppe Saronni | Claudio Bortolotto | Faustino Rupérez | Fiorenzo Favero | ? | Bianchi–Piaggio |
| 15 | Tommy Prim | Wladimiro Panizza | Giuseppe Saronni | Claudio Bortolotto | Faustino Rupérez | Fiorenzo Favero | ? | Bianchi–Piaggio |
| 16 | Giuseppe Martinelli | Wladimiro Panizza | Giuseppe Saronni | Claudio Bortolotto | Faustino Rupérez | Fiorenzo Favero | ? | Bianchi–Piaggio |
| 17 | Giuseppe Saronni | Wladimiro Panizza | Giuseppe Saronni | Claudio Bortolotto | Faustino Rupérez | Fiorenzo Favero | ? | Bianchi–Piaggio |
| 18 | Giovanni Battaglin | Wladimiro Panizza | Giuseppe Saronni | Claudio Bortolotto | Tommy Prim | Fiorenzo Favero | ? | Gis Gelati |
| 19 | Giuseppe Saronni | Wladimiro Panizza | Giuseppe Saronni | Claudio Bortolotto | Tommy Prim | Fiorenzo Favero | ? | Gis Gelati |
| 20 | Jean-René Bernaudeau | Bernard Hinault | Giuseppe Saronni | Claudio Bortolotto | Tommy Prim | Fiorenzo Favero | ? | Bianchi–Piaggio |
| 21 | Giuseppe Saronni | Bernard Hinault | Giuseppe Saronni | Claudio Bortolotto | Tommy Prim | Fiorenzo Favero | ? | Bianchi–Piaggio |
| 22 | Pierino Gavazzi | Bernard Hinault | Giuseppe Saronni | Claudio Bortolotto | Tommy Prim | Fiorenzo Favero | Pierre-Raymond Villemiane | Bianchi–Piaggio |
| Final | | Bernard Hinault | Giuseppe Saronni | Claudio Bortolotto | Tommy Prim | Fiorenzo Favero | Pierre-Raymond Villemiane | Bianchi–Piaggio |

== Final standings ==
Legend
| Pink jersey | Denotes the winner of the General classification |
| Purple jersey | Denotes the winner of the Points classification |
| Green jersey | Denotes the winner of the Mountains classification |
| Blue white | Denotes the winner of the Young rider classification |
| Blue jersey | Denotes the winner of the Campionato delle Regioni classification |

=== General classification ===
Final general classification (1–10)
| Rank | Name | Team | Time |
|---|---|---|---|
| 1 | Bernard Hinault (FRA) | Renault–Gitane–Campagnolo | 112h 08' 20" |
| 2 | Wladimiro Panizza (ITA) | Gis Gelati | + 5' 43" |
| 3 | Giovanni Battaglin (ITA) | Inoxpran | + 6' 30" |
| 4 | Tommy Prim (SWE) | Bianchi–Piaggio | + 7' 53" |
| 5 | Gianbattista Baronchelli (ITA) | Bianchi–Piaggio | + 11' 49" |
| 6 | Mario Beccia (ITA) | Hoonved–Bottecchia | + 12' 47" |
| 7 | Giuseppe Saronni (ITA) | Gis Gelati | + 12' 53" |
| 8 | Josef Fuchs (SUI) | Gis Gelati | + 20' 26" |
| 9 | Roberto Visentini (ITA) | Mobilifico San Giacomo–Benotto | + 20' 37" |
| 10 | Leonardo Natale (ITA) | Magniflex–Olmo | + 21' 30" |

=== Points classification ===
Final points classification (1–5)
| | Rider | Team | Points |
|---|---|---|---|
| 1 | Giuseppe Saronni (ITA) | Gis Gelati | 301 |
| 2 | Giovanni Mantovani (ITA) | Hoonved–Bottecchia | 215 |
| 3 | Tommy Prim (SWE) | Bianchi–Piaggio | 179 |
| 4 | Bernard Hinault (FRA) | Renault–Gitane–Campagnolo | 160 |
| 5 | Giuseppe Martinelli (ITA) | Mobilifico San Giacomo–Benotto | 151 |

=== Mountains classification ===
Final mountains classification (1–8)
| | Rider | Team | Points |
|---|---|---|---|
| 1 | Claudio Bortolotto (ITA) | Mobilifico San Giacomo–Benotto | 670 |
| 2 | Wladimiro Panizza (ITA) | Gis Gelati | 400 |
| 3 | Bernard Hinault (FRA) | Renault–Gitane–Campagnolo | 350 |
| 4 | Giovanni Battaglin (ITA) | Inoxpran | 280 |
| 5 | Jean-René Bernaudeau (FRA) | Renault–Gitane–Campagnolo | 265 |
| 6 | Tommy Prim (SWE) | Bianchi–Piaggio | 255 |
| 7 | Faustino Rupérez (ESP) | Selle Italia–Zor–Vereco–Campagnolo | 170 |
| 8 | Ángel Arroyo (ESP) | Selle Italia–Zor–Vereco–Campagnolo | 155 |

=== Young rider classification ===
Final young rider classification (1–5)
| | Rider | Team | Time |
|---|---|---|---|
| 1 | Tommy Prim (SWE) | Bianchi–Piaggio | 112h 16' 13" |
| 2 | Roberto Visentini (ITA) | Mobilifico San Giacomo–Benotto | + 12' 44" |
| 3 | Leonardo Natale (ITA) | Magniflex–Olmo | + 13' 37" |
| 4 | Faustino Rupérez (ESP) | Selle Italia–Zor–Vereco–Campagnolo | + 13' 40" |
| 5 | Jean-René Bernaudeau (FRA) | Renault–Gitane–Campagnolo | + 20' 25" |

=== Combination classification ===
Final combination classification (1–3)
| | Rider | Team | Points |
|---|---|---|---|
| 1 | Bernard Hinault (FRA) | Renault–Gitane–Campagnolo | 8 |
| 2 | Wladimiro Panizza (ITA) | Gis Gelati | 11 |
| 3 | Tommy Prim (SWE) | Bianchi–Piaggio | 12 |

=== Team classification ===
Final team classification (1–5)
| | Team | Time |
|---|---|---|
| 1 | Bianchi–Piaggio | 336h 28' 31" |
| 2 | Gis Gelati | + 5' 21" |
| 3 | Inoxpran | + 46' 59" |
| 4 | Renault–Gitane–Campagnolo | + 52' 18" |
| 5 | Selle Italia–Zor–Vereco–Campagnolo | + 1h 17' 40" |

== Doping ==
There were no positive doping tests in the Giro of 1980. There was almost one: Hinault arrived too late at the doping test after stage 21, because he was held up by reporters. According to the rules, the jury could penalize this as if he had tested positive, but decided not to do so.
