= Gran Premio Città di Camaiore =

Cycle race in Italy

Race details
- Date: Early August (until 2012); February (2013–2014)
- Region: Tuscany, Italy
- English name: Gran Prix City of Camaiore
- Local name: Gran Premio Città di Camaiore (in Italian)
- Discipline: Road
- Competition: UCI Europe Tour
- Type: One-day
- Web site: www.gpcamaiore.it

History
- First edition: 1949
- Editions: 65
- Final edition: 2014
- First winner: Massei Luigi (ITA)
- Most wins: Giuseppe Saronni (ITA) (2 wins)
- Final winner: Diego Ulissi (ITA)

The Gran Premio Città di Camaiore was a road bicycle race held in Camaiore, Tuscany, Italy. Since 2005, the race has been organised as a 1.1 event on the UCI Europe Tour. It was an amateur race between 1949 and 1965. It was traditionally held in August, but in 2013 and 2014, was held in February. In 2014 it was announced that the race would be discontinued.

== Professional winners ==
Year	Country	Rider	Team
1966	Italy	Bruno Mealli	
1967	Italy	Luciano Dalla Bona	Salvarani
1968	Italy	Gianpiero Macchi	
1969	Italy	Enrico Paolini	
1970	Italy	Mauro Simonetti	Ferretti
1971	Belgium	Eddy Merckx	Molteni
1972	Belgium	Roger De Vlaeminck	Dreher
1973	Colombia	Martín Emilio Rodríguez	
1974	Italy	Giacinto Santambroggio	Bianchi
1975	Italy	Francesco Moser	Filotex
1976	Italy	Walter Riccomi	Scic
1977	Italy	Franco Bitossi	Vibor
1978	No race		
1979	Italy	Giuseppe Saronni	Scic
1980	Italy	Silvano Contini	Bianchi
1981	Italy	Giuseppe Saronni	Gis Gelati–Campagnolo
1982	Belgium	Jean-Marie Wampers	Gis Gelati–Olmo
1983	Italy	Moreno Argentin	Sammontana
1984	Italy	Roberto Ceruti	
1985	Italy	Alberto Volpi	Sammontana–Bianchi
1986	Italy	Claudio Corti	Supermercati Brianzoli
1987	Italy	Gianni Bugno	Atala–Ofmega
1988	Denmark	Rolf Sørensen	Ariostea
1989	Italy	Franco Ballerini	Malvor–Sidi
1990	Italy	Giorgio Furlan	Diana–Colnago
1991	Italy	Gianni Faresin	ZG Mobili
1992	Italy	Davide Cassani	Ariostea
1993	Italy	Massimo Podenzana	Navigare–Blue Storm
1994	Italy	Gianluca Bortolami	Mapei–CLAS
1995	Italy	Luca Scinto	MG Maglificio–Technogym
1996	Italy	Alberto Elli	MG Maglificio–Technogym
1997	Ukraine	Alexander Gontchenkov	Roslotto–ZG Mobili
1998	Italy	Andrea Tafi	Mapei–Bricobi
1999	Italy	Massimo Donati	Vini Caldirola
2000	Italy	Wladimir Belli	Fassa Bortolo
2001	Italy	Michele Bartoli	Mapei–Quick-Step
2002	Italy	Davide Rebellin	Gerolsteiner
2003	Italy	Marco Serpellini	Lampre
2004	Italy	Paolo Bettini	Quick-Step–Davitamon
2005	Kazakhstan	Maxim Iglinskiy	Domina Vacanze–De Nardi
2006	Italy	Luca Paolini	Liquigas
2007	Italy	Fortunato Baliani	Ceramica Panaria–Navigare
2008	Italy	Leonardo Bertagnolli	Liquigas
2009	Italy	Vincenzo Nibali	Liquigas
2010	Slovenia	Kristjan Koren	Liquigas–Doimo
2011	Italy	Fabio Taborre	Acqua & Sapone
2012	Colombia	Esteban Chaves	Colombia–Coldeportes
2013	Slovakia	Peter Sagan	Cannondale
2014	Italy	Diego Ulissi	Lampre–Merida
