= 1979 Giro d'Italia =

Race details
- Dates: 17 May - 6 June 1979
- Stages: 19 + Prologue
- Distance: 3,301 km (2,051 mi)
- Winning time: 89h 29' 18"

Results
Jersey awarded to the overall winner	Winner	Giuseppe Saronni (ITA)	(Scic-Bottecchia)
	Second	Francesco Moser (ITA)	(Sanson Gelati-Luxor TV)
	Third	Bernt Johansson (SWE)	(Magniflex-Famcucine)
Jersey awarded to the points classification winner	Points	Giuseppe Saronni (ITA)	(Scic-Bottecchia)
Jersey awarded to the mountains classification winner	Mountains	Claudio Bortolotto (ITA)	(Sanson Gelati-Luxor TV)
Jersey awarded to the young rider classification winner	Young rider	Silvano Contini (ITA)	(Bianchi-Faema)
Jersey awarded to the sprints classification winner	Sprints	Paolo Rosola (ITA)	(Sapa Assicurazioni)
	Team	Sanson Gelati-Luxor TV	

The 1979 Giro d'Italia was the 62nd running of the Giro, one of cycling's Grand Tours. It started in Florence, on 17 May, with an 8 km (5.0 mi) prologue and concluded in Milan, on 6 June, with a 44 km (27.3 mi) individual time trial. A total of 130 riders from thirteen teams entered the 19-stage race, that was won by Italian Giuseppe Saronni of the Scic-Bottecchia team. The second and third places were taken by Italian Francesco Moser and Swede Bernt Johansson, respectively.

In addition to the general classification, Saronni won the points classification, Amongst the other classifications that the race awarded, Claudio Bortolotto of Sanson Gelati-Luxor TV won the mountains classification, and Bianchi-Faema's Silvano Contini completed the Giro as the best rider aged 24 or under in the general classification, finishing fifth overall. Sanson Gelati-Luxor TV finishing as the winners of the team classification, ranking each of the twenty teams contesting the race by lowest cumulative time.

== Teams ==
Thirteen of the fourteen teams invited to the 1979 Giro d'Italia participated in the race. Kas were forced to decline their invitation, in favor of racing the Vuelta a España, by the Spanish Federation which wanted the "best Hispanic" peloton to be competing in Vuelta that year. In total 12 countries were represented, 84 riders were from Italy, while the remaining 66 riders came from: Belgium (15), Switzerland (12), France (8), Denmark (3), Australia (2), Germany (1), Great Britain (1), the Netherlands (1), Norway (1), South Africa (1), and Sweden (1). Each team sent a squad of ten riders, which meant that the race started with a peloton of 130 cyclists.

Of those starting, 43 were riding the Giro d'Italia for the first time. The average age of riders was 26.42 years, ranging from 20–year–old Orlando Maini (Mobilificio San Giacomo) to 34–year–old Renato Laghi (CBM Fast-Gaggia). The team with the youngest average rider age was Sapa Assicurazioni (23), while the oldest was Sanson Gelati-Luxor TV (30). From the riders that began this edition, 111 made it to the finish in Milan.

The teams entering the race were:

- Bianchi-Faema
- CBM Fast-Gaggia
- G.B.C.-Galli-Castelli
- Gis Gelati
- Magniflex-Famcucine
- Mecap-Hoonved
- Mobilificio San Giacomo
- Peugeot-Esso-Michelin
- Sanson Gelati-Luxor TV
- Sapa Assicurazioni
- Scic-Bottecchia
- Willora-Piz Buin-Bonanza
- Zonca-Santini

== Pre-race favorites ==
The starting peloton did include the 1978 winner, Johan De Muynck. Successful French rider Bernard Hinault did not enter the race.

== Route and stages ==
The route was unveiled on 22 March 1979. Covering a total of 3,301 km (2,051 mi), it included five individual time trials, and nine stages with categorized climbs that awarded mountains classification points. The organizers chose to include two rest days. When compared to the previous year's race, the race was 309 km (192 mi) shorter and contained one more time trial. In addition, this race contained one less stage.

Stage results
Stage	Date	Course	Distance	Type	Winner
P	17 May	Florence to Florence	8 km (5 mi)	Individual time trial	Francesco Moser (ITA)
1	18 May	Florence to Perugia	156 km (97 mi)	Plain stage	Mario Beccia (ITA)
2	19 May	Perugia to Castel Gandolfo	204 km (127 mi)	Plain stage	Roger De Vlaeminck (BEL)
3	20 May	Caserta to Naples	31 km (19 mi)	Individual time trial	Francesco Moser (ITA)
4	21 May	Caserta to Potenza	210 km (130 mi)	Stage with mountain(s)	Claudio Bortolotto (ITA)
5	22 May	Potenza to Vieste	223 km (139 mi)	Stage with mountain(s)	Giuseppe Saronni (ITA)
6	23 May	Vieste to Chieti	260 km (162 mi)	Plain stage	Bruno Wolfer (SUI)
7	24 May	Chieti to Pesaro	252 km (157 mi)	Plain stage	Alan Van Heerden (RSA)
8	25 May	Rimini to City of San Marino (San Marino)	28 km (17 mi)	Individual time trial	Giuseppe Saronni (ITA)
9	26 May	City of San Marino (San Marino) to Pistoia	248 km (154 mi)	Stage with mountain(s)	Roger De Vlaeminck (BEL)
10	27 May	Lerici to Portovenere	25 km (16 mi)	Individual time trial	Knut Knudsen (NOR)
11	28 May	La Spezia to Voghera	212 km (132 mi)	Stage with mountain(s)	Bernt Johansson (SWE)
12	29 May	Alessandria to Saint-Vincent	204 km (127 mi)	Plain stage	Roger De Vlaeminck (BEL)
13	30 May	Aosta to Meda	229 km (142 mi)	Stage with mountain(s)	Dino Porrini (ITA)
14	31 May	Meda to Bosco Chiesanuova	212 km (132 mi)	Stage with mountain(s)	Bernt Johansson (SWE)
15	1 June	Verona to Treviso	121 km (75 mi)	Plain stage	Giuseppe Martinelli (ITA)
16	2 June	Treviso to Pieve di Cadore	195 km (121 mi)	Stage with mountain(s)	Roberto Ceruti (ITA)
	3 June	Rest day			
17	4 June	Pieve di Cadore to Trento	194 km (121 mi)	Stage with mountain(s)	Francesco Moser (ITA)
18	5 June	Trento to Barzio	245 km (152 mi)	Stage with mountain(s)	Amilcare Sgalbazzi (ITA)
19	6 June	Cesano Maderno to Milan	44 km (27 mi)	Individual time trial	Giuseppe Saronni (ITA)
	Total		3,301 km (2,051 mi)		

== Classification leadership ==
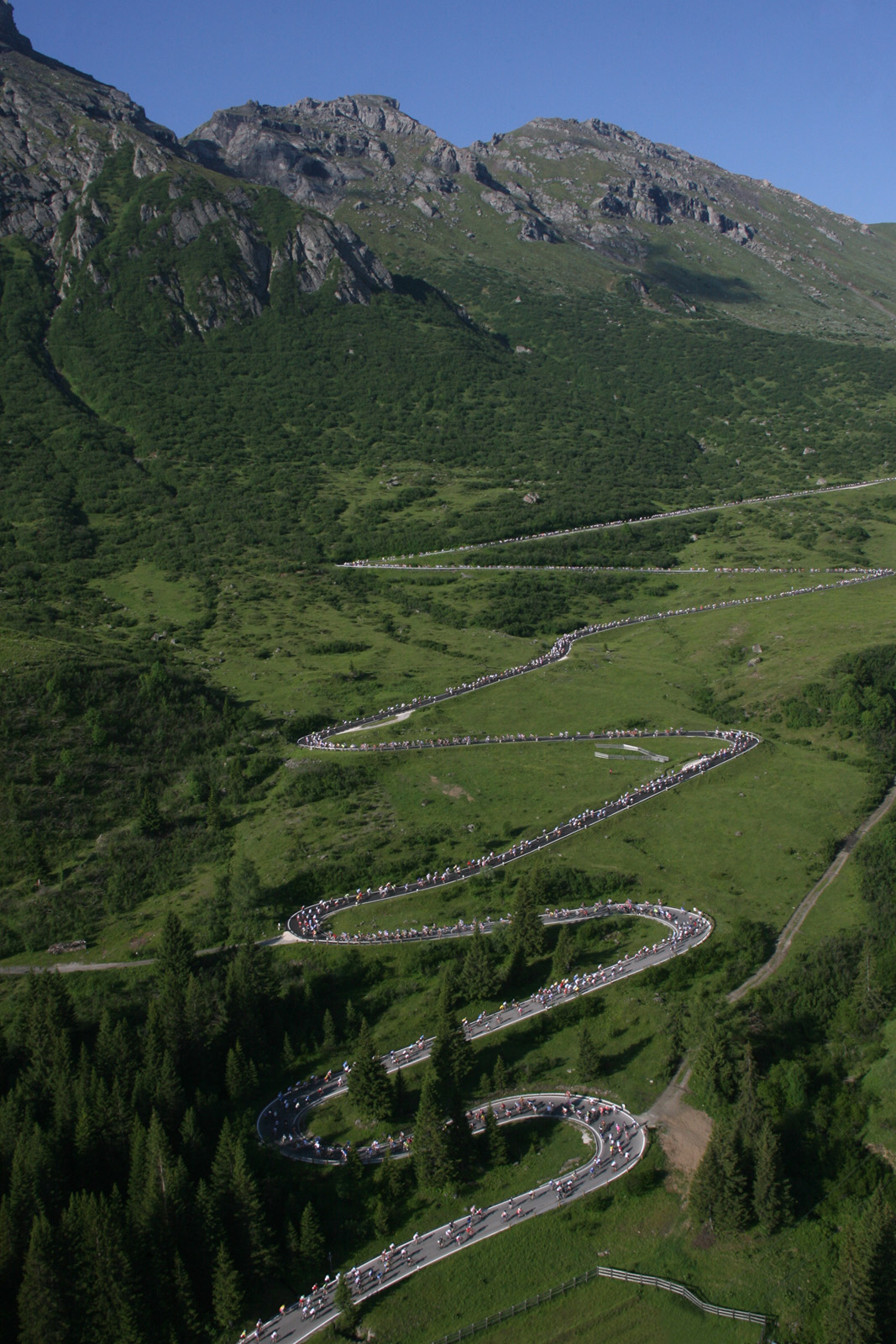
A sample of the road climbing to the top of the Passo Pordoi, the Cima Coppi (highest elevation point) of the 1979 Giro.

There were four main individual classifications contested in the 1979 Giro d'Italia, as well as a team competition. Four of them awarded jerseys to their leaders. The general classification was the most important and was calculated by adding each rider's finishing times on each stage. The rider with the lowest cumulative time was the winner of the general classification and was considered the overall winner of the Giro. The rider leading the classification wore a pink jersey to signify the classification's leadership.

The second classification was the points classification. Riders received points for finishing in the top positions in a stage finish, with first place getting the most points, and lower placings getting successively fewer points. The rider leading this classification wore a purple (or cyclamen) jersey.

The mountains classification was the third classification and its leader was denoted by the green jersey. In this ranking, points were won by reaching the summit of a climb ahead of other cyclists. Each climb was ranked as either first, second or third category, with more points available for higher category climbs. Most stages of the race included one or more categorized climbs, in which points were awarded to the riders that reached the summit first. The Cima Coppi, the race's highest point of elevation, awarded more points than the other first category climbs. The Cima Coppi for this Giro was the Passo Pordoi, which was first crossed by Italian rider Leonardo Natale.

The fourth classification, the young rider classification, was decided the same way as the general classification, but exclusive to neo-professional cyclists (in their first three years of professional racing). The leader of the classification wore a white jersey. In addition, the rider had to be aged 24 and younger.

The team classification, awarded no jersey to its leaders. In 1979, the rules of this team classification changed: it was no longer based on points, but based on time.

There were other minor classifications within the race, including the Campionato delle Regioni classification. The leader wore a blue jersey with colored vertical stripes ("maglia azzurra con banda tricolore verticale").

The FIAT classification, created in the 1976 edition, was used again, but this year the winner received a Fiat Ritmo. For this classification, there was one intermediate sprint per stage, and the first three riders scored points.

Classification leadership by stage
Stage	Winner	General classification	Points classification	Mountains classification	Young rider classification	Campionato delle Regioni	FIAT	Team classification
P	Francesco Moser	Francesco Moser	Francesco Moser	not awarded	Roberto Visentini	not awarded	not awarded	Bianchi-Faema
1	Mario Beccia	Francesco Moser	Knut Knudsen	not awarded	Roberto Visentini	?	?	Bianchi-Faema
2	Roger De Vlaeminck	Francesco Moser	Francesco Moser	not awarded	Roberto Visentini	?	?	Bianchi-Faema
3	Francesco Moser	Francesco Moser	Francesco Moser	not awarded	Silvano Contini	?	?	Bianchi-Faema
4	Claudio Bortolotto	Francesco Moser	Francesco Moser	Mario Beccia	Silvano Contini	?	?	Sanson Gelati-Luxor TV
5	Giuseppe Saronni	Francesco Moser	Francesco Moser	Mario Beccia	Silvano Contini	?	Angelo Tosoni	Sanson Gelati-Luxor TV
6	Bruno Wolfer	Francesco Moser	Giuseppe Saronni	Mario Beccia	Silvano Contini	?	Angelo Tosoni	Bianchi-Faema
7	Alan Van Heerden	Francesco Moser	Giuseppe Saronni	Mario Beccia	Silvano Contini	Paolo Rosola	Angelo Tosoni	Bianchi-Faema
8	Giuseppe Saronni	Giuseppe Saronni	Giuseppe Saronni	Mario Beccia	Silvano Contini	Paolo Rosola	Angelo Tosoni	Bianchi-Faema
9	Roger De Vlaeminck	Giuseppe Saronni	Giuseppe Saronni	Claudio Bortolotto	Silvano Contini	?	Angelo Tosoni	Bianchi-Faema
10	Knut Knudsen	Giuseppe Saronni	Giuseppe Saronni	Claudio Bortolotto	Silvano Contini	?	Angelo Tosoni	Bianchi-Faema
11	Bernt Johansson	Giuseppe Saronni	Giuseppe Saronni	Roger De Vlaeminck	Silvano Contini	?	Angelo Tosoni	Bianchi-Faema
12	Roger De Vlaeminck	Giuseppe Saronni	Giuseppe Saronni	Roger De Vlaeminck	Silvano Contini	?	Angelo Tosoni	Bianchi-Faema
13	Dino Porrini	Giuseppe Saronni	Giuseppe Saronni	Claudio Bortolotto	Silvano Contini	?	Angelo Tosoni	Bianchi-Faema
14	Bernt Johansson	Giuseppe Saronni	Giuseppe Saronni	Bernt Johansson	Silvano Contini	Giuseppe Martinelli	Cesare Cipollini	Bianchi-Faema
15	Giuseppe Martinelli	Giuseppe Saronni	Francesco Moser	Bernt Johansson	Silvano Contini	Giuseppe Martinelli	Angelo Tosoni	Bianchi-Faema
16	Roberto Ceruti	Giuseppe Saronni	Giuseppe Saronni	Bernt Johansson	Silvano Contini	?	Angelo Tosoni	Bianchi-Faema
17	Francesco Moser	Giuseppe Saronni	Francesco Moser	Claudio Bortolotto	Silvano Contini	?	Angelo Tosoni	Sanson Gelati-Luxor TV
18	Amilcare Sgalbazzi	Giuseppe Saronni	Francesco Moser	Claudio Bortolotto	Silvano Contini	Paolo Rosola	Angelo Tosoni	Sanson Gelati-Luxor TV
19	Giuseppe Saronni	Giuseppe Saronni	Giuseppe Saronni	Claudio Bortolotto	Silvano Contini	Paolo Rosola	Angelo Tosoni	Sanson Gelati-Luxor TV
Final		Giuseppe Saronni	Giuseppe Saronni	Claudio Bortolotto	Silvano Contini	Paolo Rosola	Angelo Tosoni	Sanson Gelati-Luxor TV

== Final standings ==
Legend
Pink jersey	Denotes the winner of the General classification
Purple jersey	Denotes the winner of the Points classification
Green jersey	Denotes the winner of the Mountains classification
Blue white	Denotes the winner of the Young rider classification
Blue jersey	Denotes the winner of the Campionato delle Regioni classification

=== General classification ===
Final general classification (1–10)
Rank	Name	Team	Time
1	Giuseppe Saronni (ITA)	Scic-Bottecchia	89h 29' 18"
2	Francesco Moser (ITA)	Sanson Gelati-Luxor TV	+ 2' 09"
3	Bernt Johansson (SWE)	Magniflex-Famcucine	+ 3' 13"
4	Michel Laurent (FRA)	Peugeot-Esso-Michelin	+ 5' 31"
5	Silvano Contini (ITA)	Bianchi-Faema	+ 7' 33"
6	Mario Beccia (ITA)	Mecap-Hoonved	+ 7' 50"
7	Fausto Bertoglio (ITA)	Mobilificio San Giacomo	+ 11' 27"
8	Josef Fuchs (SUI)	Scic-Bottecchia	+ 13' 07"
9	Gottfried Schmutz (SUI)	Willora-Piz Buin-Bonanza	+ 14' 16"
10	Roberto Visentini (ITA)	CBM Fast-Gaggia	+ 16' 11"

=== Points classification ===
Final points classification (1-5)
	Rider	Team	Points
1	Giuseppe Saronni (ITA)	Scic-Bottecchia	275
2	Francesco Moser (ITA)	Sanson Gelati-Luxor TV	274
3	Bernt Johansson (SWE)	Magniflex-Famcucine	260
4	Mario Beccia (ITA)	Mecap-Hoonved	130
5	Michel Laurent (FRA)	Peugeot-Esso-Michelin	118

=== Mountains classification ===
Final mountains classification (1-10)
	Rider	Team	Points
1	Claudio Bortolotto (ITA)	Sanson Gelati-Luxor TV	495
2	Beat Breu (SUI)	Willora-Piz Buin-Bonanza	330
3	Bernt Johansson (SWE)	Magniflex-Famcucine	300
4	Mario Beccia (ITA)	Mecap-Hoonved	215
5	Mario Ceruti (ITA)	Magniflex-Famcucine	170
5	Amilcare Sgalbazzi (ITA)	Magniflex-Famcucine	170
5	Bruno Vicino (ITA)	G.B.C.-Galli-Castelli	170
8	Leonardo Natale (ITA)	Sapa Assicurazioni	150
8	Giuseppe Saronni (ITA)	Scic-Bottecchia	150
10	Francesco Moser (ITA)	Sanson Gelati-Luxor TV	130

=== Young rider classification ===
Final young rider classification (1–3)
	Rider	Team	Time
1	Silvano Contini (ITA)	Bianchi-Faema	89h 36' 51"
2	Roberto Visentini (ITA)	CBM Fast-Gaggia	+ 8' 38"
3	Marino Amadori (ITA)	Sapa Assicurazioni	+ 11' 24"

=== Traguardi Fiat Ritmo classification ===
Final traguardi fiat ritmo classification (1–2)
	Rider	Team	Points
1	Angelo Tosoni (ITA)	CBM Fast-Gaggia	46
2	Cesare Cipollini (ITA)	Mobilificio San Giacomo	24
2	Walter Dusi (ITA)	Sapa Assicurazioni	24
2	Alessio Antonini (ITA)	Mobilificio San Giacomo	24

=== Campionato delle Regioni classification ===
Final campionato delle regioni classification (1–3)
	Rider	Team	Points
1	Paolo Rosola (ITA)	Sapa Assicurazioni	46
2	Giuseppe Martinelli (ITA)	Mobilificio San Giacomo	44
3	Bruno Wolfer (SUI)	Zonca-Santini	30

=== Team classification ===
Final team classification (1–3)
	Team	Time
1	Sanson Gelati-Luxor TV	?
2	Scic-Bottecchia	+ 6' 48"
3	Magniflex-Famcucine	+ 10' 42"

== Doping ==
There were no positive doping tests in the Giro of 1979.
