= Alan Van Heerden =

Personal information
- Born: 11 December 1954 Johannesburg, South Africa
- Died: 15 December 2009 (aged 55)

Cycling career
- Sport: Cycling
- Discipline: Road
- Role: Rider

Professional teams
- 1979–1980: Peugeot–Esso–Michelin
- 1983–1985: Highway Electrical
- 1985–1991: Southern Sun
- 1990: VW Fox-Imperial
- 1991: Snowflake-Blue Ribbon

Alan van Heerden (11 December 1954 in Johannesburg – 15 December 2009) was a South African cyclist. He was the first ever South African to win a stage of a Grand Tour.

He was killed in a car accident in 2009 at the age of 56.

== Major results ==
1978
3rd Paris-Roubaix Espoirs
1979
1st Stage 7 Giro d'Italia
