= Leonardo Natale =

Italian cyclist

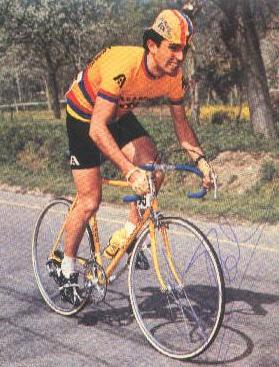
- Natale in 1982

Personal information
- Born: October 25, 1958 (age 67) Saronno, Italy

Cycling career
- Sport: Cycling
- Current team: Retired
- Discipline: Road
- Role: Rider
- Rider type: Climber

Professional teams
- 1978: Intercontinentale Assicurazioni
- 1979: Sapa Assicurazioni–Frontini
- 1980–1981: Magniflex–Olmo
- 1982–1984: Del Tongo
- 1985: Gis Gelati

Leonardo Natale (born 25 October 1958) is an Italian former road cyclist, who competed as a professional from 1978 to 1985.

He won the Cima Coppi title in the 1979 Giro d'Italia through being the first rider over the Pordoi Pass on stage 17.

== Major results ==
1976
1st Trofeo Emilio Paganessi
1977
2nd Gran Premio Industria e Commercio Artigianato Carnaghese
1980
9th Giro del Lazio
10th Overall Giro d'Italia
1981
3rd Overall Tour de Suisse
10th Giro dell'Appennino
1982
8th GP du canton d'Argovie

=== Grand Tour general classification results timeline ===
Grand Tour	1979	1980	1981	1982	1983	1984
Giro d'Italia	16	10	13	13	31	32
Tour de France	—	—	—	—	—	—
Vuelta a España	—	—	—	—	18	29
