= Graziano Salvietti =

Italian cyclist

Personal information
- Born: 25 June 1956 (age 70) Figline Valdarno, Italy

Cycling career
- Sport: Cycling
- Role: Rider

Graziano Salvietti (born 25 June 1956) is an Italian former professional racing cyclist. He rode in the 1986 Tour de France.
