= Silvano Contini =

Italian cyclist (born 1958)

Personal information
- Born: 15 January 1958 (age 68) Leggiuno, Italy

Cycling career
- Sport: Cycling
- Current team: Retired
- Discipline: Road
- Role: Rider

Amateur team
- 1977: F.lli Pozzi Ferramenta

Professional teams
- 1978–1984: Bianchi–Faema
- 1985: Ariostea–Oece
- 1986: Gis Gelati
- 1987: Del Tongo
- 1988–1989: Malvor–Bottecchia–Sidi
- 1990: Gis Gelati–Benotto

Major wins
- Grand Tours Giro d'Italia Young rider classification (1979) 4 individual stages (1980, 1982) 1 TTT stage (1983) Stage races Tour of the Basque Country (1981) Deutschland Tour (1981) Grand Prix du Midi Libre (1985) One-day races and Classics Liège–Bastogne–Liège (1982)

Silvano Contini (born 15 January 1958) is an Italian former professional road bicycle racer. He was professional from 1978 to 1990, his main successes were the 1982 Liège–Bastogne–Liège of 1982, the 1985 Grand Prix du Midi Libre and the 1981 Tour of the Basque Country. He also won the Trofeo Baracchi in 1983 with Daniel Gisiger as well as four stages of the Giro d'Italia.

== Major results ==
1977
1st Stage 5 Vuelta Ciclista de Chile
3rd Overall Giro della Valle d'Aosta

1st Stages 2, 4 & 6

1978
6th Giro dell'Emilia
1979
1st Giro del Lazio
1st Gran Piemonte
2nd Giro di Lombardia
2nd Trofeo Matteotti
3rd Overall Giro di Puglia
3rd Giro dell'Emilia
3rd Giro dell'Umbria
3rd Giro del Veneto
5th Overall Giro d'Italia

1st Young rider classification

6th Overall Tour de Romandie
6th Giro di Romagna
7th Coppa Placci
1980
1st GP Industria & Commercio di Prato
1st Stage 7 Giro d'Italia
1st Gran Premio Città di Camaiore
1st Trofeo Matteotti
1st Overall Cronostaffetta
2nd Overall Tour de Romandie

1st Stage 3

2nd Overall Ruota d'Oro

1st Stage 3

3rd Tre Valli Varesine
3rd Giro del Veneto
3rd Coppa Placci
3rd Giro di Campania
3rd Milano–Vignola
4th GP Montelupo
5th Overall Paris–Nice
7th GP Industria & Artigianato
7th Giro di Toscana
8th Overall Giro di Sardegna
8th Giro di Lombardia
8th Giro dell'Emilia
8th Giro del Lazio
10th Milano–Torino
10th Trofeo Laigueglia
1981
1st Overall Tour of the Basque Country

1st Stages 3, 4 & 5b

1st Overall Deutschland Tour
1st Stage 1 Paris–Nice
3rd Giro dell'Emilia
3rd Giro del Veneto
3rd Trofeo Pantalica
4th Overall Giro d'Italia
4th Coppa Ugo Agostoni
4th Giro dell'Appennino
4th Trofeo Laigueglia
10th Züri-Metzgete
1982
1st Liège–Bastogne–Liège
1st Coppa Bernocchi
1st Visp–Grächen
1st Stage 7a Tour of Sweden
2nd Giro dell'Emilia
3rd Overall Giro d'Italia

1st Stages 6 & 17

3rd Overall Tour de Romandie
3rd GP Industria & Artigianato
4th Overall Setmana Catalana de Ciclisme

1st Stages 3 & 4

4th Giro di Romagna
6th Coppa Ugo Agostoni
7th Milan–San Remo
8th Gent–Wevelgem
9th GP de Fourmies
10th Overall Tirreno–Adriatico
1983
1st Trofeo Baracchi (with Daniel Gisiger)
1st Giro del Lazio
1st Stage 1 (TTT) Giro d'Italia
2nd Tre Valli Varesine
5th Paris–Tours
6th GP Industria & Commercio di Prato
1984
1st Coppa Sabatini
2nd Road race, National Road Championships
3rd Giro dell'Umbria
6th Overall Tour Méditerranéen
6th Giro dell'Etna
9th Giro di Lombardia
10th Overall Settimana Internazionale di Coppi e Bartali
1985
1st Overall Grand Prix du Midi Libre

1st Stage 1

1st Overall Tour de l'Aude

1st Stage 1

1st Overall Giro di Puglia
1st Overall Ruota d'Oro
1st Coppa Placci
2nd Overall Giro del Trentino
6th Giro di Lombardia
7th Overall Giro d'Italia
7th Overall Tirreno–Adriatico
8th Firenze–Pistoia
1986
4th Grand Prix de Wallonie
1987
1st Giro dell'Umbria
3rd Trofeo Pantalica
5th Coppa Placci
6th Overall Settimana Internazionale di Coppi e Bartali
9th Overall Route du Sud
1988
1st Overall Trofeo dello Scalatore

1st Stage 3

2nd Giro di Toscana
5th Giro dell'Emilia
9th Tre Valli Varesine
9th Overall Giro del Trentino
10th Coppa Placci
1989
2nd Overall Vuelta a Murcia

1st Stage 5a

=== Grand Tour general classification results timeline ===
Grand Tour	1979	1980	1981	1982	1983	1984	1985	1986	1987	1988	1989	1990
Vuelta a España	—	—	—	—	—	—	—	—	—	—	52	—
Giro d'Italia	5	DNF	4	3	DNF	34	7	20	—	22	53	29
Tour de France	—	—	—	—	—	—	—	41	55	—	—	—
