= Josef Wehrli =

Swiss cyclist

Personal information
- Born: 3 December 1954 (age 71) Einsiedeln, Switzerland

Cycling career
- Sport: Cycling
- Role: Rider

Josef Wehrli (born 3 December 1954) is a Swiss former professional racing cyclist. He rode in one edition of the Tour de France, three editions of the Giro d'Italia and one edition of the Vuelta a España.
