= Josef Fuchs (cyclist) =

Swiss cyclist (born 1948)

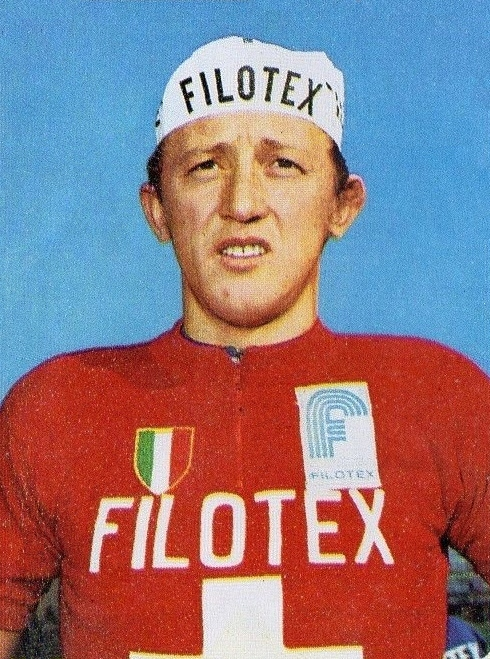

Personal information
- Full name: Josef Fuchs
- Nickname: Sepp Fuchs
- Born: 24 July 1948 (age 78) Einsiedeln, Switzerland

Cycling career
- Sport: Cycling
- Discipline: Road
- Role: Rider

Professional teams
- 1972–1975: Filotex
- 1976: Super Ser
- 1977: Sanson
- 1978: Fiorella–Citroën
- 1979: Scic–Bottecchia
- 1980: Gis Gelati
- 1981: Cilo–Aufina

Major wins
- Liège–Bastogne–Liège (1981)
Medal record
Representing Switzerland
World Championships
Bronze medal – third place	1969 Zolder	100 km team time trial
Silver medal – second place	1971 Varese	Individual pursuit

Josef Fuchs (born 24 July 1948) is a retired Swiss racing cyclist. As an amateur he won two world championship medals in 1969 and 1971, both on the road and on track. He also won a few minor races and two stages of the Tour de l'Avenir (1969 and 1971) and one of the Milk Race (1971).

In late 1971 he turned professional and the same year won the Giro della Toscana. He placed eighth overall in the 1975 Tour de France and won the Liège–Bastogne–Liège race in 1981.

During his career Fuchs won four national titles, two on track, as amateur in 1970 and 1971, and two on the road, as professional in 1972 and 1973.

== Major results ==
1966
3rd Road race, National Junior Road Championships
1969
1st Stage 10b Tour de l'Avenir
1970
1st Individual pursuit, National Amateur Track Championships
1st Tour des Quatre-Cantons
1971
1st Individual pursuit, National Amateur Track Championships
1st Giro del Mendrisiotto
1st Stage 1 (ITT) Tour de l'Avenir
2nd Individual pursuit, UCI Amateur Track World Championships
3rd Overall Milk Race

1st Stage 8

1972
1st Road race, National Road Championships
1st Giro di Toscana
1st Stage 1c (TTT) Cronostaffetta
2nd Overall Tirreno–Adriatico

1st Stage 2

6th GP Monaco
1973
1st Road race, National Road Championships
1st Prologue (TTT) Tour de Suisse
1974
1st Overall (TTT) Cronostaffetta
4th Overall Tirreno–Adriatico
7th Overall Vuelta a la Comunidad Valenciana

1st Prologue (TTT)

7th Giro di Toscana
7th Giro di Campania
8th Trofeo Laigueglia
9th Giro di Romagna
10th Coppa Sabatini
1975
2nd Overall Tour de Romandie
4th Overall À travers Lausanne
4th GP Lugano
8th Overall Tour de France
9th Züri-Metzgete
1976
2nd Trofeo Masferrer
4th Overall Critérium du Dauphiné Libéré
4th Overall Setmana Catalana de Ciclisme
4th Overall Vuelta a la Comunidad Valenciana
8th Overall Vuelta a España
9th Overall Volta a Catalunya
1977
4th GP Alghero
5th Overall Tirreno–Adriatico
10th Züri-Metzgete
10th Giro di Toscana
10th Coppa Placci
1978
3rd Overall Tour de Suisse
3rd Overall Giro di Sardegna
4th Overall Tirreno–Adriatico

1st Stage 3

9th Tre Valli Varesine
1979
1st Stage 3 Tirreno–Adriatico
2nd GP Lugano
4th Overall Tour de Suisse

1st Stage 5

4th Overall Vuelta a Andalucía
5th Overall Volta a Catalunya

1st Stage 4

8th Overall Giro d'Italia
1980
2nd Overall Tour de Suisse

1st Stage 8b (ITT)

2nd Visp–Grachen
3rd Trofeo Baracchi (with Daniel Gisiger)
6th Gran Piemonte
8th Overall Giro d'Italia
8th Milano–Torino
10th GP du canton d'Argovie
1981
1st Liège–Bastogne–Liège
1st GP Lugano
2nd Overall Tour de Suisse
5th Overall Giro d'Italia
7th Overall Critérium International
7th Overall Tour Méditerranéen
10th Overall Tirreno–Adriatico
