= Mario Beccia =

Italian cyclist

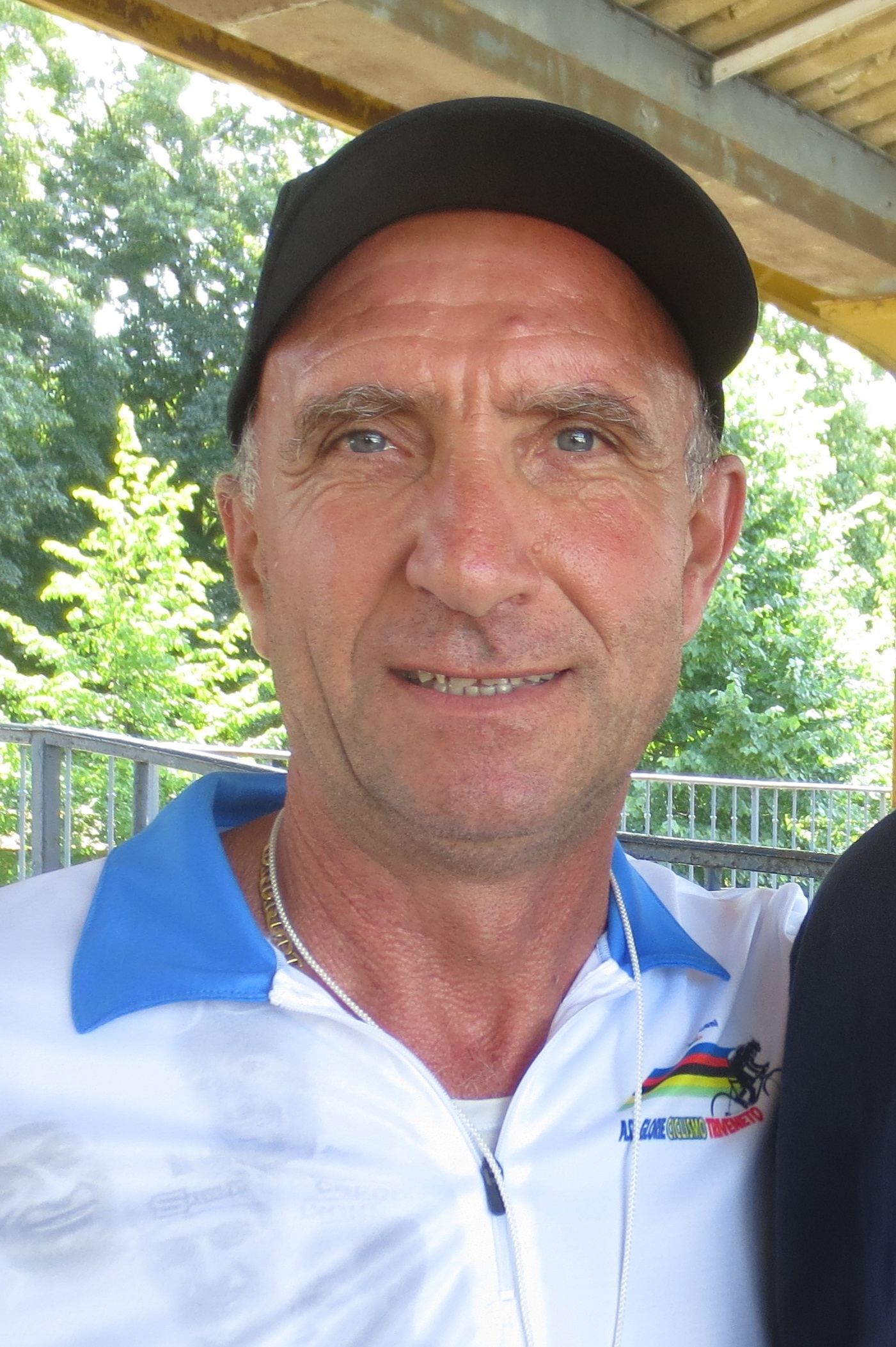

Personal information
- Full name: Mario Beccia
- Born: August 16, 1955 (age 71) Troia, Apulia, Italy

Cycling career
- Sport: Cycling
- Current team: Retired
- Discipline: Road
- Role: Rider; Directeur sportif; Team manager

Professional teams
- 1977–1978: Sanson
- 1979–1980: Mecap–Hoonved
- 1981: Santini–Selle Italia
- 1982–1988: Hoonved–Bottecchia

Managerial team
- 2006–2009: Vorarlberger

Major wins
- Giro d'Italia, 4 stages La Flèche Wallonne (1982); Tour de Suisse (1980)

Mario Beccia (born August 16, 1955, in Troia, Apulia) is an Italian former professional road bicycle racer, active between 1977 and 1988.

During his career, Beccia won a total of fifteen races, including four stages of the Giro d'Italia, the Tour de Suisse of 1980 and the La Flèche Wallonne of 1982.

== Major results ==
1977
1st Giro dell'Emilia
2nd GP Industria & Commercio di Prato
2nd Giro dell'Appennino
9th Overall Giro d'Italia

1st Young rider classification
1st Stage 5

1978
3rd Trofeo Matteotti
3rd Giro dell'Umbria
9th Giro dell'Emilia
1979
2nd Giro dell'Appennino
4th Milano–Torino
4th Giro dell'Emilia
6th Overall Giro d'Italia

1st Stage 1

7th Trofeo Laigueglia
10th Milan–San Remo
1980
1st Overall Tour de Suisse

1st Stage 9

2nd Giro dell'Appennino
3rd Tour du Nord-Ouest
5th Overall Giro del Trentino
6th Overall Giro d'Italia
10th Giro di Lombardia
1981
1st Stage 4 Giro d'Italia
1st Col San Martino
2nd Overall Tour of the Basque Country
3rd Overall Giro di Frasassi
4th Overall Giro del Trentino
1982
1st La Flèche Wallonne
3rd Trofeo Pantalica
3rd Giro dell'Appennino
7th Overall Giro d'Italia
1983
1st Stage 3 Tour de Romandie
3rd Overall Ruota d'Oro
4th Overall Giro d'Italia

1st Stage 19

6th Overall Tour de Suisse
1984
1st Stage 3 Tirreno–Adriatico
1st Giro dell'Appennino
1st Milano-Vignola
1st Giro dell'Umbria
4th Overall Giro del Trentino
9th Overall Giro d'Italia
1985
2nd Züri-Metzgete
3rd GP Industria & Commercio di Prato
6th G.P. Camaiore
7th La Flèche Wallonne
8th Liège–Bastogne–Liège
9th Giro di Lombardia
1986
3rd Milan–San Remo
1987
7th Overall Giro del Trentino
