= Roberto Ceruti =

Italian cyclist

Personal information
- Born: 10 November 1953 (age 73) Paderno Ponchielli, Italy

Cycling career
- Sport: Cycling

Roberto Ceruti (born 10 November 1953) is an Italian former cyclist. He competed in the individual road race event at the 1976 Summer Olympics.

== Major results ==
1975
1st Circuito del Porto
3rd Piccolo Giro di Lombardia
1976
1st Overall GP Tell

1st Stage 6b (ITT)

2nd Overall Giro Ciclistico d'Italia
1977
1st Giro di Romagna
3rd Nokere Koerse
4th Giro della Provincia di reggio Calabria
4th Coppa Placci
5th Overall Giro di Puglia
1978
2nd Coppa Placci
5th Giro dell'Emilia
7th Milano–Torino
8th Giro di Lombardia
8th GP Lugano
10th GP Alghero
1979
1st Stage 16 Giro d'Italia
5th Giro dell'Emilia
6th Giro di Campania
6th Coppa Bernocchi
7th Giro di Toscana
1980
1st Giro dell'Umbria
3rd GP Industria & Commercio di Prato
3rd Milano–Torino
3rd GP Union Dortmund
4th Grand Prix of Aargau Canton
4th Coppa Sabatini
5th Trofeo Laigueglia
6th Giro di Lombardia
6th G.P. Camaiore
8th Giro di Romagna
9th Coppa Placci
1981
2nd GP Montelupo
4th Giro del Lazio
1982
3rd GP Industria & Commercio di Prato
4th Tre Valli Varesine
5th Coppa Sabatini
1983
2nd Coppa Ugo Agostoni
5th Milano-Vignola
1984
1st G.P. Camaiore
3rd Giro dell'Emilia
4th Tre Valli Varesine
1985
1st Stage 2 Giro d'Italia (TTT)
