= Gottfried Schmutz =

Swiss cyclist

Personal information
- Full name: Gottfried
- Nickname: Gody
- Born: 26 October 1954 (age 72) Olten, Switzerland

Cycling career
- Sport: Cycling
- Discipline: Road bicycle racing
- Role: Rider

Professional teams
- 1977: A.D.S.
- 1978–1979: Willora
- 1980–1981: Cilo–Aufina
- 1982: Royal-Wrengler
- 1983: Eorotex–Magniflex
- 1984–1985: Dromedario
- 1986: Cilo–Aufina
- 1987: Fibok–Müller

Major wins
- Tour de Berne 1979; Swiss Cycling Champion (1978, 1980, 1985); Grand Prix de Lugano 1981

Gottfried "Gody" Schmutz (born 26 October 1954 in Olten, Switzerland) is a retired Swiss road racing cyclist. He was professional from 1977 to 1987. He was the Swiss National Road Race champion in 1978, 1980 and 1985.

== Results ==
- 1978
  - Swiss Road Cycling Champion 1978
  - 3rd, Tour of Britain
  - 3rd, Stausee-Rundfahrt Klingnau
  - 3rd, Tour de Berne
  - 5th, Tour de Suisse
  - 6th, Tour de Romandie
- 1979
  - Winner, Tour de Berne
  - 2nd, Tour de Lausanne
- 1980
  - Swiss Road Cycling Champion 1980
  - Winner, Tour de Lausanne
  - 8th, Tour of Flanders
- 1981
  - 4th, Tour de Suisse
  - 10th, Tour de Romandie
- 1985
  - Swiss Road Cycling Champion 1985
  - Winner, Grand Prix de Lugano
