= Giuseppe Martinelli =

Italian cyclist

Personal information
- Full name: Giuseppe Martinelli
- Born: 11 March 1955 (age 71) Rovato, Italy

Cycling career
- Sport: Cycling
- Current team: XDS Astana Team
- Discipline: Road
- Role: Rider (retired); Directeur sportif

Professional teams
- 1977: Jollyceramica
- 1978: Magniflex-Torpado
- 1979–1980: San Giacomo
- 1981: Santini-Selle Italia
- 1982: Selle San Marco
- 1983–1984: Alfa Lum
- 1985: Alpilatte-Cierre

Managerial teams
- 1986–1987: Ecoflam
- 1988–1996: Carrera Jeans–Vagabond
- 1997–2001: Mercatone Uno
- 2002–2004: Saeco–Longoni Sport
- 2005–2007: Lampre–Caffita
- 2009: Amica Chips–Knauf
- 2011–: Astana

Major wins
- Giro d'Italia, 2 stages Vuelta a España, 1 stage
Medal record
Men's road bicycle racing
Representing Italy
Olympic Games
Silver medal – second place	1976 Montreal	Individual Road Race

Giuseppe Martinelli (born 11 March 1955) is a retired road bicycle racer from Italy, who was a professional rider from 1977 to 1985. He represented his native country at the 1976 Summer Olympics in Montreal, Quebec, Canada, where he won silver medal in the men's individual road race behind Sweden's Bernt Johansson. In 2011, Martinelli became the manager of the Astana cycling team, replacing Yvon Sanquer.
