= Cilo–Aufina =

Team information
- Registered: Switzerland
- Founded: 1978
- Disbanded: 1986
- Discipline: Road

Team name history
- 1978 1979 1980–1983 1984 1984 Giro d'Italia 1985 1986: Willora–Piz Buin–Mairag; Willora–Piz Buin–Bonanza; Cilo–Aufina; Cilo–Aufina–Crans–Montana; Cilo–Aufina–Magniflex; Cilo–Aufina–Magniflex; Cilo–Aufina–Gemeaz Cusin

Cilo–Aufina was a Swiss professional cycling team that existed from 1978 to 1986. Its main sponsor was Swiss bicycle manufacturer Cilo.
