= Malvor–Bottecchia =

Team information
- UCI code: MAL
- Registered: Italy
- Founded: 1978
- Disbanded: 1990
- Discipline: Road
- Bicycles: Bottecchia (1982–1986 and 1988); Colnago (1989); Bottecchia (1990)

Key personnel
- General manager: Dino Zandegù

Team name history
- 1978 1979 1980 1981 1982 1983–1984 1985–1986 1986 Tour de France 1987 1988 1989–1990: Mecap–Selle Italia; Mecap–Hoonved; Hoonved–Bottecchia; Hoonved–Bottecchia–Herdal; Hoonved–Bottecchia; Malvor–Bottecchia; Malvor–Bottecchia–Vaporella; Malvor–Bottecchia–Sidi; Paini–Bottecchia–Sidi; Malvor–Bottecchia–Sidi; Malvor–Sidi

Malvor–Bottecchia was an Italian professional cycling team that was active between 1978 and 1990.

== History ==
The team was led primarily by Dino Zandegù. The bike team did not operate in the 1987 season. It was primarily supplied bikes by Bottecchia, with the exception being the 1989 season. It collected thirteen stage wins in its history.

== Notable riders ==
- Giuseppe Saronni Italy
- Lech Piasecki Poland
- Roberto Pagnin Italy
- Acacio da Silva Mora Portugal
- Daniel Gisiger Switzerland

== Major wins ==
=== Major one-day races ===
- Züri-Metzgete
  - 1986 Acacio da Silva Mora Portugal
- Grand Prix des Nations
  - 1978 Daniel Gisiger Switzerland

=== Grand tours ===
==== Giro d'Italia ====
  - 13 stages (1 in 1978, 1 in 1984, 4 in 1985, 2 in 1986, 4 in 1989 and 1 in 1990)

==== Vuelta a España ====
- 2 stages (2 in 1989)

==== Tour de France ====
- 2 stages (1 in 1982, 1 in 1986)

=== Other races ===
- General classification - Tour de Suisse (1988) - Helmut Wechselberger
  - 1 stage in the Tour de Suisse (1 in 1985)
- 4 stages in the Tour de Romandie (2 in 1978, 2 in 1985)
- General classification - Vuelta a Andalucía (1985) - Fabio Bordonali
- 2 stages (1985)
