= Gis Gelati =

Italian cycling team

- 1980 jersey

Team information
- UCI code: GIS
- Registered: Italy
- Founded: 1978
- Disbanded: 1991
- Discipline: Road
- Status: Retired
- Bicycles: Pinarello (1978); Benotto (1979); Colnago (1980–1981); Olmo (1982); Moser (1983–1985); Rossin (1986); Basso (1987–1988); Benotto (1990–1991)

Team name history
- 1978-1980 1981 1982 1983 1984 1985–1986 1987 1988 1990 1991: Gis Gelati; Gis Gelati–Campagnolo; Gis Gelati–Olmo; Gis Gelati; Gis Gelati–Tuc Lu; Gis Gelati; Gis Gelati–Jollyscarpe; Gis–Ecoflam–Jollyscarpe; Gis Gelati–Benotto; Gis Gelati–Ballan

Gis Gelati was an Italian professional cycling team that was active between 1978 and 1991, with headquarters in Giulianova, Abruzzo. The team was sponsored by a number of bicycle companies to include Benotto, Basso, Campagnolo, Moser, Pinarello and Olmo. Rossin Bikes was a co-sponsor and the supplier of team bicycles in 1986.

== History ==
The first team manager was Piero Pieroni, who stayed for three years and then returned for another season in 1984. In 1978, the team's first season, they won two events with Marino Basso. They won the 1983 Giro d'Italia with Francesco Moser. The team was very successful in the Giro d'Italia, they won many Points classifications, a General classification, and 23 stages. The team won a few classics due to the help of Roger De Vlaeminck and Francesco Moser. The team folded in 1991.

== Notable riders ==
- Giuseppe Saronni Italy
- Roger De Vlaeminck Belgium
- Francesco Moser Italy
- Johan van der Velde Netherlands
- Adriano Baffi Italy
- Dave Akam United Kingdom

== Major wins ==
=== Major one-day races ===
- Milan–San Remo
  - 1979 Roger De Vlaeminck Belgium
  - 1984 Francesco Moser Italy
- Omloop Het Volk
  - 1979 Roger De Vlaeminck Belgium

=== Grand Tours ===
==== Giro d'Italia ====
- General classification:
  - 1984 Francesco Moser Italy
- Points classification:
  - 1980 - Giuseppe Saronni Italy
  - 1981 - Giuseppe Saronni Italy
  - 1987 - Johan van der Velde Netherlands
  - 1988 - Johan van der Velde Netherlands
- Young rider classification:
  - 1986 - Marco Giovannetti Italy
  - 23 stages (3 in 1979, 7 in 1980, 3 in 1981, 1 in 1983, 4 in 1984, 3 in 1985, 2 in 1987, and 1 in 1991)

==== Vuelta a España ====
- 4 stages (4 in 1984)

=== Other races ===
- 2 stages in the Tirreno–Adriatico (in 1988)
- 1 stage in the Tour de Romandie (2 in 1981)
