= List of teams and cyclists in the 1982 Giro d'Italia =

The 1982 Giro d'Italia was the 65th edition of the Giro d'Italia, one of cycling's Grand Tours. The field consisted of 162 riders, and 110 riders finished the race.

== By rider ==
Legend
No.	Starting number worn by the rider during the Giro
Pos.	Position in the general classification
DNF	Denotes a rider who did not finish

No.	Name	Nationality	Team	Ref
1	Guido Bontempi	Italy	Inoxpran	
2	Giorgio Aiardi	Italy	Inoxpran	
3	Alfredo Chinetti	Italy	Inoxpran	
4	Alfonso Dal Pian	Italy	Inoxpran	
5	Bruno Leali	Italy	Inoxpran	
6	Luciano Loro	Italy	Inoxpran	
7	Luigino Moro	Italy	Inoxpran	
8	Giancarlo Perini	Italy	Inoxpran	
9	Amilcare Sgalbazzi	Italy	Inoxpran	
11	Giuseppe Petito	Italy	Alfa Lum–Sauber	
12	Anders Adamsson	Sweden	Alfa Lum–Sauber	
13	Mauro Angelucci	Italy	Alfa Lum–Sauber	
14	Giancarlo Baldoni	Italy	Alfa Lum–Sauber	
15	Stefano Boni	Italy	Alfa Lum–Sauber	
16	Corrado Donadio	Italy	Alfa Lum–Sauber	
17	Salvatore Maccali	Italy	Alfa Lum–Sauber	
18	Piero Onesti	Italy	Alfa Lum–Sauber	
19	Michael Wilson	Australia	Alfa Lum–Sauber	
21	Giancarlo Casiraghi	Italy	Atala	
22	Walter Delle Case	Italy	Atala	
23	Geir Digerud	Norway	Atala	
24	Urs Freuler	Switzerland	Atala	
25	Pierino Gavazzi	Italy	Atala	
26	Mario Noris	Italy	Atala	
27	Giovanni Renosto	Italy	Atala	
28	Silvano Riccò	Italy	Atala	
29	Paolo Rosola	Italy	Atala	
31	Gianbattista Baronchelli	Italy	Bianchi–Piaggio	
32	Silvano Contini	Italy	Bianchi–Piaggio	
33	Aldo Donadello	Italy	Bianchi–Piaggio	
34	Alessandro Paganessi	Italy	Bianchi–Piaggio	
35	Serge Parsani	Italy	Bianchi–Piaggio	
36	Tommy Prim	Sweden	Bianchi–Piaggio	
37	Alessandro Pozzi	Italy	Bianchi–Piaggio	
38	Alf Segersäll	Sweden	Bianchi–Piaggio	
39	Ennio Vanotti	Italy	Bianchi–Piaggio	
41	Dietrich Thurau	West Germany	Bibione–Stern TV	
42	Jürgen Blasel	West Germany	Bibione–Stern TV	
43	Uwe Bolten	West Germany	Bibione–Stern TV	
44	Göte Heine	West Germany	Bibione–Stern TV	
45	Walter Hoffmann	West Germany	Bibione–Stern TV	
46	Stefan Schröpfer	West Germany	Bibione–Stern TV	
47	Marc Goossens	Belgium	Bibione–Stern TV	
48	Johan Wellens	Belgium	Bibione–Stern TV	
49	Bert Pronk	Netherlands	Bibione–Stern TV	
51	Luciano Borgognoni	Italy	Del Tongo	
52	Claudio Bortolotto	Italy	Del Tongo	
53	Roberto Ceruti	Italy	Del Tongo	
54	Gabriele Landoni	Italy	Del Tongo	
55	Leonardo Natale	Italy	Del Tongo	
56	Wladimiro Panizza	Italy	Del Tongo	
57	Giuseppe Saronni	Italy	Del Tongo	
58	Guido Van Calster	Belgium	Del Tongo	
59	Gianluigi Zuanel	Italy	Del Tongo	
61	Francesco Moser	Italy	Famcucine	
62	Marino Amadori	Italy	Famcucine	
63	Piero Ghibaudo	Italy	Famcucine	
64	Valerio Lualdi	Italy	Famcucine	
65	Giovanni Mantovani	Italy	Famcucine	
66	Palmiro Masciarelli	Italy	Famcucine	
67	Leonardo Mazzantini	Italy	Famcucine	
68	Dante Morandi	Italy	Famcucine	
69	Claudio Torelli	Italy	Famcucine	
71	Faustino Rupérez	Spain	Zor–Helios–Gemeaz Cusin	
72	Pedro Muñoz	Spain	Zor–Helios–Gemeaz Cusin	
73	Isidro Juárez	Spain	Zor–Helios–Gemeaz Cusin	
74	Jesús Rodríguez Magro	Spain	Zor–Helios–Gemeaz Cusin	
75	Ángel Ocaña	Spain	Zor–Helios–Gemeaz Cusin	
76	Álvaro Pino	Spain	Zor–Helios–Gemeaz Cusin	
77	Guillermo de la Peña	Spain	Zor–Helios–Gemeaz Cusin	
78	Eduardo Chozas	Spain	Zor–Helios–Gemeaz Cusin	
79	Ángel Camarillo	Spain	Zor–Helios–Gemeaz Cusin	
81	Fabrizio Verza	Italy	Gis Gelati–Olmo	
82	Leonardo Bevilacqua	Italy	Gis Gelati–Olmo	
83	Noël Dejonckheere	Belgium	Gis Gelati–Olmo	
84	Simone Fraccaro	Italy	Gis Gelati–Olmo	
85	Czesław Lang	Poland	Gis Gelati–Olmo	
86	Maurizio Piovani	Italy	Gis Gelati–Olmo	
87	Luciano Rabottini	Italy	Gis Gelati–Olmo	
88	Ennio Salvador	Italy	Gis Gelati–Olmo	
89	Eddy Schepers	Belgium	Gis Gelati–Olmo	
91	Mario Beccia	Italy	Hoonved–Bottecchia	
92	Antonio Bevilacqua	Italy	Hoonved–Bottecchia	
93	Emanuele Bombini	Italy	Hoonved–Bottecchia	
94	Robert Dill-Bundi	Switzerland	Hoonved–Bottecchia	
95	Giuseppe Faraca	Italy	Hoonved–Bottecchia	
96	Luigi Ferreri	Italy	Hoonved–Bottecchia	
97	Daniel Gisiger	Switzerland	Hoonved–Bottecchia	
98	Silvestro Milani	Italy	Hoonved–Bottecchia	
99	Benedetto Patellaro	Italy	Hoonved–Bottecchia	
101	Juan Fernández	Spain	Kelme–Merckx	
102	Vicente Belda	Spain	Kelme–Merckx	
103	Roy Schuiten	Netherlands	Kelme–Merckx	
104	Enrique Martínez	Spain	Kelme–Merckx	
105	Celestino Prieto	Spain	Kelme–Merckx	
106	Jaime Vilamajó	Spain	Kelme–Merckx	
107	Juan Pujol	Spain	Kelme–Merckx	
108	José Recio	Spain	Kelme–Merckx	
109	Jeronimo Ibañez	Spain	Kelme–Merckx	
111	Lucien Van Impe	Belgium	Metauro Mobili–Pinarello	
112	Vittorio Algeri	Italy	Metauro Mobili–Pinarello	
113	Nazzareno Berto	Italy	Metauro Mobili–Pinarello	
114	Hans D'haese	Belgium	Metauro Mobili–Pinarello	
115	Marco Franceschini	Italy	Metauro Mobili–Pinarello	
116	Marco Groppo	Italy	Metauro Mobili–Pinarello	
117	Riccardo Magrini	Italy	Metauro Mobili–Pinarello	
118	Flavio Miozzo	Italy	Metauro Mobili–Pinarello	
119	Nedo Pinori	Italy	Metauro Mobili–Pinarello	
121	Bernard Becaas	France	Renault–Elf–Gitane	
122	Charly Bérard	France	Renault–Elf–Gitane	
123	Patrick Bonnet	France	Renault–Elf–Gitane	
124	Lucien Didier	Luxembourg	Renault–Elf–Gitane	
125	Laurent Fignon	France	Renault–Elf–Gitane	
126	Bernard Hinault	France	Renault–Elf–Gitane	
127	Marc Madiot	France	Renault–Elf–Gitane	
128	Jean-François Rodriguez	France	Renault–Elf–Gitane	
129	Alain Vigneron	France	Renault–Elf–Gitane	
131	Gottfried Schmutz	Switzerland	Royal–Wrangler	
132	Bruno Wolfer	Switzerland	Royal–Wrangler	
133	Erich Maechler	Switzerland	Royal–Wrangler	
134	Fridolin Keller	Switzerland	Royal–Wrangler	
135	Daniel Müller	Switzerland	Royal–Wrangler	
136	Bernard Gavillet	Switzerland	Royal–Wrangler	
137	Acácio da Silva	Portugal	Royal–Wrangler	
138	Rudy Weber	West Germany	Royal–Wrangler	
139	Peter Kehl	West Germany	Royal–Wrangler	
141	Roberto Visentini	Italy	Sammontana–Benotto	
142	Moreno Argentin	Italy	Sammontana–Benotto	
143	Fulvio Bertacco	Italy	Sammontana–Benotto	
144	Maurizio Bertini	Italy	Sammontana–Benotto	
145	Pierangelo Bincoletto	Italy	Sammontana–Benotto	
146	Claudio Corti	Italy	Sammontana–Benotto	
147	Raniero Gradi	Italy	Sammontana–Benotto	
148	George Mount	United States	Sammontana–Benotto	
149	Marino Polini	Italy	Sammontana–Benotto	
151	Franco Chioccioli	Italy	Selle Italia–Chinol	
152	Tranquillo Andreetta	Italy	Selle Italia–Chinol	
153	Cesare Cipollini	Italy	Selle Italia–Chinol	
154	Ercole Mealli	Italy	Selle Italia–Chinol	
155	Jakob Bausager	Denmark	Selle Italia–Chinol	
156	Per Bausager	Denmark	Selle Italia–Chinol	
157	Vittorio Setti	Italy	Selle Italia–Chinol	
158	Mario Gazzola	Italy	Selle Italia–Chinol	
159	Antonio Alfonsini	Italy	Selle Italia–Chinol	
161	Alfio Vandi	Italy	Selle San Marco–Wilier Triestina	
162	Franco Conti	Italy	Selle San Marco–Wilier Triestina	
163	Antonio D'alonzo	Italy	Selle San Marco–Wilier Triestina	
164	Fiorenzo Favero	Italy	Selle San Marco–Wilier Triestina	
165	Giuseppe Martinelli	Italy	Selle San Marco–Wilier Triestina	
166	Giuseppe Montella	Italy	Selle San Marco–Wilier Triestina	
167	Sergio Santimaria	Italy	Selle San Marco–Wilier Triestina	
168	Claudio Savini	Italy	Selle San Marco–Wilier Triestina	
169	Giovanni Testolin	Italy	Selle San Marco–Wilier Triestina	
171	Daniele Antonioni	Italy	Termolan	
172	Daniele Caroli	Italy	Termolan	
173	Davide Cassani	Italy	Termolan	
174	Claudio Girlanda	Italy	Termolan	
175	Orlando Maini	Italy	Termolan	
176	Enea Montanari	Italy	Termolan	
177	Enrico Montanari	Italy	Termolan	
178	Jørgen Marcussen	Denmark	Termolan	
179	Erminio Rizzi	Italy	Termolan	
