= List of teams and cyclists in the 1981 Giro d'Italia =

The 1981 Giro d'Italia was the 64th edition of the Giro d'Italia, one of cycling's Grand Tours. The field consisted of 130 riders, and 104 riders finished the race.

== By rider ==
Legend
No.	Starting number worn by the rider during the Giro
Pos.	Position in the general classification
DNF	Denotes a rider who did not finish

No.	Name	Nationality	Team	Ref
1	Gianbattista Baronchelli	Italy	Bianchi–Piaggio	
2	Gaetano Baronchelli	Italy	Bianchi–Piaggio	
3	Silvano Contini	Italy	Bianchi–Piaggio	
4	Aldo Donadello	Italy	Bianchi–Piaggio	
5	Serge Parsani	Italy	Bianchi–Piaggio	
6	Ennio Vanotti	Italy	Bianchi–Piaggio	
7	Knut Knudsen	Norway	Bianchi–Piaggio	
8	Tommy Prim	Sweden	Bianchi–Piaggio	
9	Alf Segersäll	Sweden	Bianchi–Piaggio	
10	Bruno Wolfer	Switzerland	Bianchi–Piaggio	
11	Thierry Bolle	Switzerland	Cilo–Aufina	
12	Beat Breu	Switzerland	Cilo–Aufina	
13	Serge Demierre	Switzerland	Cilo–Aufina	
14	Josef Fuchs	Switzerland	Cilo–Aufina	
15	Daniel Gisiger	Switzerland	Cilo–Aufina	
16	Erwin Lienhard	Switzerland	Cilo–Aufina	
17	Stefan Mutter	Switzerland	Cilo–Aufina	
18	Gottfried Schmutz	Switzerland	Cilo–Aufina	
19	Ueli Sutter	Switzerland	Cilo–Aufina	
20	Josef Wehrli	Switzerland	Cilo–Aufina	
21	Francesco Moser	Italy	Famcucine–Campagnolo	
22	Carmelo Barone	Italy	Famcucine–Campagnolo	
23	Gregor Braun	West Germany	Famcucine–Campagnolo	
24	Piero Ghibaudo	Italy	Famcucine–Campagnolo	
25	Palmiro Masciarelli	Italy	Famcucine–Campagnolo	
26	Leonardo Mazzantini	Italy	Famcucine–Campagnolo	
27	Alberto Minetti	Italy	Famcucine–Campagnolo	
28	Dante Morandi	Italy	Famcucine–Campagnolo	
29	Glauco Santoni	Italy	Famcucine–Campagnolo	
30	Claudio Torelli	Italy	Famcucine–Campagnolo	
31	Faustino Rupérez	Spain	Zor–Helios–Novostil	
32	Ángel Arroyo	Spain	Zor–Helios–Novostil	
33	Miguel María Lasa	Spain	Zor–Helios–Novostil	
34	Pedro Muñoz	Spain	Zor–Helios–Novostil	
35	José Luis López Cerrón	Spain	Zor–Helios–Novostil	
36	José María González	Spain	Zor–Helios–Novostil	
37	Eduardo Chozas	Spain	Zor–Helios–Novostil	
38	Guillermo de la Peña	Spain	Zor–Helios–Novostil	
39	Eugenio Herranz	Spain	Zor–Helios–Novostil	
40	Carlos Machín Rodríguez	Spain	Zor–Helios–Novostil	
41	Giuseppe Saronni	Italy	Gis Gelati–Campagnolo	
42	Leonardo Bevilacqua	Italy	Gis Gelati–Campagnolo	
43	Roberto Ceruti	Italy	Gis Gelati–Campagnolo	
44	Simone Fraccaro	Italy	Gis Gelati–Campagnolo	
45	Gabriel Landoni	Italy	Gis Gelati–Campagnolo	
46	Valerio Lualdi	Italy	Gis Gelati–Campagnolo	
47	Wladimiro Panizza	Italy	Gis Gelati–Campagnolo	
48	Giuseppe Passuello	Italy	Gis Gelati–Campagnolo	
49	Maurizio Piovani	Italy	Gis Gelati–Campagnolo	
50	Gianluigi Zuanel	Italy	Gis Gelati–Campagnolo	
51	Fiorenzo Aliverti	Italy	Hoonved–Bottecchia–Herdal	
52	Antonio Bevilacqua	Italy	Hoonved–Bottecchia–Herdal	
53	Emanuele Bombini	Italy	Hoonved–Bottecchia–Herdal	
54	Luciano Borgognoni	Italy	Hoonved–Bottecchia–Herdal	
55	Giuseppe Faraca	Italy	Hoonved–Bottecchia–Herdal	
56	Giovanni Mantovani	Italy	Hoonved–Bottecchia–Herdal	
57	Giovanni Moro	Italy	Hoonved–Bottecchia–Herdal	
58	Benedetto Patellaro	Italy	Hoonved–Bottecchia–Herdal	
59	Luciano Rui	Italy	Hoonved–Bottecchia–Herdal	
60	Flavio Zappi	Italy	Hoonved–Bottecchia–Herdal	
61	Giovanni Battaglin	Italy	Inoxpran	
62	Per Bausager	Denmark	Inoxpran	
63	Giuliano Biatta	Italy	Inoxpran	
64	Guido Bontempi	Italy	Inoxpran	
65	Alfredo Chinetti	Italy	Inoxpran	
66	Alfonso Del Pian	Italy	Inoxpran	
67	Bruno Leali	Italy	Inoxpran	
68	Luciano Loro	Italy	Inoxpran	
69	Jørgen Marcussen	Denmark	Inoxpran	
70	Amilcare Sgalbazzi	Italy	Inoxpran	
71	Dietrich Thurau	West Germany	Kotter's–GBC	
72	Heinz Betz	West Germany	Kotter's–GBC	
73	Hans-Peter Jakst	West Germany	Kotter's–GBC	
74	Peter Kehl	West Germany	Kotter's–GBC	
75	Ludo Loos	Belgium	Kotter's–GBC	
76	Stefan Schropfer	West Germany	Kotter's–GBC	
77	Roy Schuiten	Netherlands	Kotter's–GBC	
78	Rudy Weber	West Germany	Kotter's–GBC	
79	Daniele Tinchella	Italy	Kotter's–GBC	
80	Sante Fossato	Italy	Kotter's–GBC	
81	Marino Amadori	Italy	Magniflex–Olmo	
82	Giancarlo Casiraghi	Italy	Magniflex–Olmo	
83	Mario Noris	Italy	Magniflex–Olmo	
84	Pierino Gavazzi	Italy	Magniflex–Olmo	
85	Bernt Johansson	Sweden	Magniflex–Olmo	
86	Giuseppe Lanzoni	Italy	Magniflex–Olmo	
87	Francesco Masi	Italy	Magniflex–Olmo	
88	Leonardo Natale	Italy	Magniflex–Olmo	
89	Giovanni Renosto	Italy	Magniflex–Olmo	
90	Paolo Rosola	Italy	Magniflex–Olmo	
91	Willem Peeters	Belgium	Safir–Ludo–Galli	
92	Benny Schepmans	Belgium	Safir–Ludo–Galli	
93	Willy Sprangers	Belgium	Safir–Ludo–Galli	
94	Jean-Philippe Vandenbrande	Belgium	Safir–Ludo–Galli	
95	Henri Vandenbrande	Belgium	Safir–Ludo–Galli	
96	Marc Van Geel	Belgium	Safir–Ludo–Galli	
97	Ronny Van Holen	Belgium	Safir–Ludo–Galli	
98	Eddy Van Hoof	Belgium	Safir–Ludo–Galli	
99	Willy Vigouroux	Belgium	Safir–Ludo–Galli	
100	John Trevorrow	Australia	Safir–Ludo–Galli	
101	Roberto Visentini	Italy	Sammontana–Benotto	
102	Moreno Argentin	Italy	Sammontana–Benotto	
103	Fulvio Bertacco	Italy	Sammontana–Benotto	
104	Maurizio Bertini	Italy	Sammontana–Benotto	
105	Pierangelo Bincoletto	Italy	Sammontana–Benotto	
106	Claudio Corti	Italy	Sammontana–Benotto	
107	Salvatore Maccali	Italy	Sammontana–Benotto	
108	Raniero Gradi	Italy	Sammontana–Benotto	
109	George Mount	United States	Sammontana–Benotto	
110	Alessandro Pozzi	Italy	Sammontana–Benotto	
111	Mario Beccia	Italy	Santini–Selle Italia	
112	Claudio Bortolotto	Italy	Santini–Selle Italia	
113	Giuseppe Martinelli	Italy	Santini–Selle Italia	
114	Tranquillo Andreetta	Italy	Santini–Selle Italia	
115	Alessio Antonini	Italy	Santini–Selle Italia	
116	Silvano Cervato	Italy	Santini–Selle Italia	
117	Fiorenzo Favero	Italy	Santini–Selle Italia	
118	Riccardo Magrini	Italy	Santini–Selle Italia	
119	Luciano Rabottini	Italy	Santini–Selle Italia	
120	Jean-Marie Wampers	Belgium	Santini–Selle Italia	
121	Alfio Vandi	Italy	Selle San Marco–Gabrielli	
122	Cesare Cipollini	Italy	Selle San Marco–Gabrielli	
123	Walter Clivati	Italy	Selle San Marco–Gabrielli	
124	Franco Conti	Italy	Selle San Marco–Gabrielli	
125	Antonio D'alonzo	Italy	Selle San Marco–Gabrielli	
126	Corrado Donadio	Italy	Selle San Marco–Gabrielli	
127	Enrico Maestrelli	Italy	Selle San Marco–Gabrielli	
128	Flavio Miozzo	Italy	Selle San Marco–Gabrielli	
129	Sergio Santimaria	Italy	Selle San Marco–Gabrielli	
130	Claudio Savini	Italy	Selle San Marco–Gabrielli	
