= 1982 Giro d'Italia, Prologue to Stage 11 =

Cycling race stages

The 1982 Giro d'Italia was the 65th edition of the Giro d'Italia, one of cycling's Grand Tours. The Giro began in Milan, with a prologue team time trial on 13 May, and Stage 11 occurred on 25 May with a stage to Camigliatello Silano, followed by a rest day. The race finished in Turin on 6 June.

== Prologue ==
13 May 1982 — Milan, 16 km (9.9 mi) (TTT)

Prologue result

Rank	Team	Time
1	Renault–Elf–Gitane	19' 09"
2	Famcucine	+ 2"
3	Hoonved–Bottecchia	+ 17"
4	Inoxpran	+ 23"
5	Atala	s.t.
6	Sammontana–Benotto	+ 26"
7	Gis Gelati–Olmo	s.t.
8	Bianchi–Piaggio	s.t.
9	Del Tongo	+ 30"
10	Royal–Wrangler	+ 35"

General classification after Prologue

Rank	Rider	Team	Time
1	Bernard Hinault (FRA)	Renault–Elf–Gitane	19' 09"
2	Lucien Didier (LUX)	Renault–Elf–Gitane	s.t.
3	Patrick Bonnet (FRA)	Renault–Elf–Gitane	s.t.
4	Marc Madiot (FRA)	Renault–Elf–Gitane	s.t.
5	Bernard Becaas (FRA)	Renault–Elf–Gitane	s.t.
6	Charly Bérard (FRA)	Renault–Elf–Gitane	s.t.
7	Laurent Fignon (FRA)	Renault–Elf–Gitane	s.t.
8	Jean-François Rodriguez (FRA)	Renault–Elf–Gitane	s.t.
9	Alain Vigneron (FRA)	Renault–Elf–Gitane	s.t.
10	Francesco Moser (ITA)	Famcucine	+ 2"

== Stage 1 ==
14 May 1982 — Parma to Viareggio, 174 km (108 mi)

Stage 1 result

Rank	Rider	Team	Time
1	Giuseppe Saronni (ITA)	Del Tongo	4h 12' 55"
2	Paolo Rosola (ITA)	Atala	s.t.
3	Robert Dill-Bundi (SUI)	Hoonved–Bottecchia	s.t.
4	Guido Bontempi (ITA)	Inoxpran	s.t.
5	Claudio Girlanda (ITA)	Termolan	s.t.
6	Giovanni Mantovani (ITA)	Famcucine	s.t.
7	Noël Dejonckheere (BEL)	Gis Gelati–Olmo	s.t.
8	Cesare Cipollini (ITA)	Selle Italia–Chinol	s.t.
9	Peter Kehl (FRG)	Royal–Wrangler	s.t.
10	Davide Cassani (ITA)	Termolan	s.t.

General classification after Stage 1

Rank	Rider	Team	Time
1	Patrick Bonnet (FRA)	Renault–Elf–Gitane	4h 32' 04"
2	Marc Madiot (FRA)	Renault–Elf–Gitane	s.t.
3	Bernard Hinault (FRA)	Renault–Elf–Gitane	s.t.
4	Alain Vigneron (FRA)	Renault–Elf–Gitane	s.t.
5	Lucien Didier (LUX)	Renault–Elf–Gitane	s.t.
6	Giuseppe Saronni (ITA)	Del Tongo	s.t.
7	Charly Bérard (FRA)	Renault–Elf–Gitane	s.t.
8	Bernard Becaas (FRA)	Renault–Elf–Gitane	s.t.
9	Laurent Fignon (FRA)	Renault–Elf–Gitane	s.t.
10	Jean-François Rodriguez (FRA)	Renault–Elf–Gitane	s.t.

== Stage 2 ==
15 May 1982 — Viareggio to Cortona, 233 km (145 mi)

Stage 2 result

Rank	Rider	Team	Time
1	Michael Wilson (AUS)	Alfa Lum–Sauber	6h 03' 19"
2	Laurent Fignon (FRA)	Renault–Elf–Gitane	s.t.
3	Alfio Vandi (ITA)	Selle San Marco–Wilier Triestina	s.t.
4	Tommy Prim (SWE)	Bianchi–Piaggio	+ 2"
5	Mario Beccia (ITA)	Hoonved–Bottecchia	s.t.
6	Giuseppe Saronni (ITA)	Del Tongo	+ 6"
7	Francesco Moser (ITA)	Famcucine	s.t.
8	Bernard Hinault (FRA)	Renault–Elf–Gitane	+ 8"
9	Silvano Contini (ITA)	Bianchi–Piaggio	s.t.
10	Vittorio Algeri (ITA)	Metauro Mobili–Pinarello	s.t.

General classification after Stage 2

Rank	Rider	Team	Time
1	Laurent Fignon (FRA)	Renault–Elf–Gitane	10h 35' 03"
2	Giuseppe Saronni (ITA)	Del Tongo	+ 26"
3	Michael Wilson (AUS)	Alfa Lum–Sauber	+ 27"
4	Bernard Hinault (FRA)	Renault–Elf–Gitane	+ 28"
5	Francesco Moser (ITA)	Famcucine	s.t.
6	Marc Madiot (FRA)	Renault–Elf–Gitane	+ 31"
7	Piero Ghibaudo (ITA)	Famcucine	+ 33"
8	Valerio Lualdi (ITA)	Famcucine	s.t.
9	Mario Beccia (ITA)	Hoonved–Bottecchia	+ 39"
10	Tommy Prim (SWE)	Bianchi–Piaggio	+ 43"

== Stage 3 ==
16 May 1982 — Perugia to Assisi, 37 km (23 mi) (ITT)

Stage 3 result

Rank	Rider	Team	Time
1	Bernard Hinault (FRA)	Renault–Elf–Gitane	47' 25"
2	Tommy Prim (SWE)	Bianchi–Piaggio	+ 11"
3	Francesco Moser (ITA)	Famcucine	+ 39"
4	Silvano Contini (ITA)	Bianchi–Piaggio	+ 1' 07"
5	Giuseppe Saronni (ITA)	Del Tongo	+ 1' 10"
6	Lucien Van Impe (BEL)	Metauro Mobili–Pinarello	+ 1' 45"
7	Mario Beccia (ITA)	Hoonved–Bottecchia	+ 1' 54"
8	Michael Wilson (AUS)	Alfa Lum–Sauber	+ 1' 57"
9	Robert Dill-Bundi (SUI)	Hoonved–Bottecchia	+ 1' 58"
10	Czesław Lang (POL)	Gis Gelati–Olmo	+ 2' 07"

General classification after Stage 3

Rank	Rider	Team	Time
1	Bernard Hinault (FRA)	Renault–Elf–Gitane	11h 22' 56"
2	Tommy Prim (SWE)	Bianchi–Piaggio	+ 26"
3	Francesco Moser (ITA)	Famcucine	+ 39"
4	Giuseppe Saronni (ITA)	Del Tongo	+ 1' 08"
5	Silvano Contini (ITA)	Bianchi–Piaggio	+ 1' 33"
6	Michael Wilson (AUS)	Alfa Lum–Sauber	+ 1' 56"
7	Laurent Fignon (FRA)	Renault–Elf–Gitane	+ 1' 57"
8	Mario Beccia (ITA)	Hoonved–Bottecchia	+ 2' 05"
9	Lucien Van Impe (BEL)	Metauro Mobili–Pinarello	+ 2' 31"
10	Czesław Lang (POL)	Gis Gelati–Olmo	+ 2' 36"

== Stage 4 ==
17 May 1982 — Assisi to Rome, 169 km (105 mi)

Stage 4 result

Rank	Rider	Team	Time
1	Urs Freuler (SUI)	Atala	4h 18' 45"
2	Peter Kehl (FRG)	Royal–Wrangler	s.t.
3	Nazzareno Berto (ITA)	Metauro Mobili–Pinarello	s.t.
4	Noël Dejonckheere (BEL)	Gis Gelati–Olmo	s.t.
5	Paolo Rosola (ITA)	Atala	s.t.
6	Marc Goossens (BEL)	Bibione–Stern TV	s.t.
7	Francesco Moser (ITA)	Famcucine	s.t.
8	Pierino Gavazzi (ITA)	Atala	s.t.
9	Fiorenzo Favero (ITA)	Selle San Marco–Wilier Triestina	s.t.
10	Alfredo Chinetti (ITA)	Inoxpran	s.t.

General classification after Stage 4

Rank	Rider	Team	Time
1	Bernard Hinault (FRA)	Renault–Elf–Gitane	15h 41' 41"
2	Tommy Prim (SWE)	Bianchi–Piaggio	+ 26"
3	Francesco Moser (ITA)	Famcucine	+ 39"
4	Giuseppe Saronni (ITA)	Del Tongo	+ 1' 08"
5	Silvano Contini (ITA)	Bianchi–Piaggio	+ 1' 33"
6	Michael Wilson (AUS)	Alfa Lum–Sauber	+ 1' 56"
7	Laurent Fignon (FRA)	Renault–Elf–Gitane	+ 1' 57"
8	Mario Beccia (ITA)	Hoonved–Bottecchia	+ 2' 05"
9	Lucien Van Impe (BEL)	Metauro Mobili–Pinarello	+ 2' 31"
10	Czesław Lang (POL)	Gis Gelati–Olmo	+ 2' 36"

== Stage 5 ==
18 May 1982 — Rome to Caserta, 213 km (132 mi)

Stage 5 result

Rank	Rider	Team	Time
1	Urs Freuler (SUI)	Atala	5h 33' 11"
2	Giovanni Mantovani (ITA)	Famcucine	s.t.
3	Pierino Gavazzi (ITA)	Atala	s.t.
4	Francesco Moser (ITA)	Famcucine	s.t.
5	Silvestro Milani (ITA)	Hoonved–Bottecchia	s.t.
6	Peter Kehl (FRG)	Royal–Wrangler	s.t.
7	Marc Goossens (BEL)	Bibione–Stern TV	s.t.
8	Cesare Cipollini (ITA)	Selle Italia–Chinol	s.t.
9	Nazzareno Berto (ITA)	Metauro Mobili–Pinarello	s.t.
10	Giuseppe Martinelli (ITA)	Selle San Marco–Wilier Triestina	s.t.

General classification after Stage 5

Rank	Rider	Team	Time
1	Bernard Hinault (FRA)	Renault–Elf–Gitane	21h 14' 52"
2	Tommy Prim (SWE)	Bianchi–Piaggio	+ 26"
3	Francesco Moser (ITA)	Famcucine	+ 39"
4	Giuseppe Saronni (ITA)	Del Tongo	+ 1' 08"
5	Silvano Contini (ITA)	Bianchi–Piaggio	+ 1' 33"
6	Michael Wilson (AUS)	Alfa Lum–Sauber	+ 1' 56"
7	Laurent Fignon (FRA)	Renault–Elf–Gitane	+ 1' 57"
8	Mario Beccia (ITA)	Hoonved–Bottecchia	+ 2' 05"
9	Lucien Van Impe (BEL)	Metauro Mobili–Pinarello	+ 2' 31"
10	Czesław Lang (POL)	Gis Gelati–Olmo	+ 2' 36"

== Stage 6 ==
19 May 1982 — Caserta to Castellammare di Stabia, 130 km (81 mi)

Stage 6 result

Rank	Rider	Team	Time
1	Silvano Contini (ITA)	Bianchi–Piaggio	3h 17' 28"
2	Fabrizio Verza (ITA)	Gis Gelati–Olmo	+ 12"
3	Giuseppe Saronni (ITA)	Del Tongo	+ 50"
4	Francesco Moser (ITA)	Famcucine	s.t.
5	Alfredo Chinetti (ITA)	Inoxpran	s.t.
6	Leonardo Mazzantini (ITA)	Famcucine	s.t.
7	Laurent Fignon (FRA)	Renault–Elf–Gitane	s.t.
8	Alessandro Paganessi (ITA)	Bianchi–Piaggio	s.t.
9	Bernard Hinault (FRA)	Renault–Elf–Gitane	s.t.
10	Gottfried Schmutz (SUI)	Royal–Wrangler	s.t.

General classification after Stage 6

Rank	Rider	Team	Time
1	Bernard Hinault (FRA)	Renault–Elf–Gitane	24h 33' 10"
2	Silvano Contini (ITA)	Bianchi–Piaggio	+ 13"
3	Tommy Prim (SWE)	Bianchi–Piaggio	+ 26"
4	Francesco Moser (ITA)	Famcucine	+ 29"
5	Giuseppe Saronni (ITA)	Del Tongo	+ 53"
6	Fabrizio Verza (ITA)	Gis Gelati–Olmo	+ 1' 45"
7	Laurent Fignon (FRA)	Renault–Elf–Gitane	+ 1' 57"
8	Mario Beccia (ITA)	Hoonved–Bottecchia	+ 2' 05"
9	Lucien Van Impe (BEL)	Metauro Mobili–Pinarello	+ 2' 31"
10	Czesław Lang (POL)	Gis Gelati–Olmo	+ 2' 36"

== Stage 7 ==
20 May 1982 — Castellammare di Stabia to Diamante, 226 km (140 mi)

Stage 7 result

Rank	Rider	Team	Time
1	Francesco Moser (ITA)	Famcucine	6h 14' 08"
2	Paolo Rosola (ITA)	Atala	s.t.
3	Giuseppe Saronni (ITA)	Del Tongo	s.t.
4	Noël Dejonckheere (BEL)	Gis Gelati–Olmo	s.t.
5	Giovanni Mantovani (ITA)	Famcucine	s.t.
6	Peter Kehl (FRG)	Royal–Wrangler	s.t.
7	Pierino Gavazzi (ITA)	Atala	s.t.
8	Marc Goossens (BEL)	Bibione–Stern TV	s.t.
9	Silvestro Milani (ITA)	Hoonved–Bottecchia	s.t.
10	Franco Chioccioli (ITA)	Selle Italia–Chinol	s.t.

General classification after Stage 7

Rank	Rider	Team	Time
1	Francesco Moser (ITA)	Famcucine	30h 47' 18"
2	Bernard Hinault (FRA)	Renault–Elf–Gitane	+ 1"
3	Silvano Contini (ITA)	Bianchi–Piaggio	+ 14"
4	Tommy Prim (SWE)	Bianchi–Piaggio	+ 27"
5	Giuseppe Saronni (ITA)	Del Tongo	+ 49"
6	Fabrizio Verza (ITA)	Gis Gelati–Olmo	+ 1' 46"
7	Laurent Fignon (FRA)	Renault–Elf–Gitane	+ 1' 58"
8	Mario Beccia (ITA)	Hoonved–Bottecchia	+ 2' 06"
9	Lucien Van Impe (BEL)	Metauro Mobili–Pinarello	+ 2' 32"
10	Czesław Lang (POL)	Gis Gelati–Olmo	+ 2' 37"

== Rest day 1 ==
21 May 1982

== Stage 8 ==
22 May 1982 — Taormina to Agrigento, 248 km (154 mi)

Stage 8 result

Rank	Rider	Team	Time
1	Moreno Argentin (ITA)	Sammontana–Benotto	7h 10' 13"
2	Gianbattista Baronchelli (ITA)	Bianchi–Piaggio	s.t.
3	Juan Fernández (ESP)	Kelme–Merckx	s.t.
4	Giuseppe Saronni (ITA)	Del Tongo	s.t.
5	Francesco Moser (ITA)	Famcucine	s.t.
6	Laurent Fignon (FRA)	Renault–Elf–Gitane	s.t.
7	Mario Beccia (ITA)	Hoonved–Bottecchia	s.t.
8	Lucien Van Impe (BEL)	Metauro Mobili–Pinarello	s.t.
9	Silvano Contini (ITA)	Bianchi–Piaggio	s.t.
10	Giuseppe Petito (ITA)	Alfa Lum–Sauber	s.t.

General classification after Stage 8

Rank	Rider	Team	Time
1	Francesco Moser (ITA)	Famcucine	37h 57' 31"
2	Bernard Hinault (FRA)	Renault–Elf–Gitane	+ 1"
3	Silvano Contini (ITA)	Bianchi–Piaggio	+ 14"
4	Tommy Prim (SWE)	Bianchi–Piaggio	+ 27"
5	Giuseppe Saronni (ITA)	Del Tongo	+ 44"
6	Fabrizio Verza (ITA)	Gis Gelati–Olmo	+ 1' 46"
7	Laurent Fignon (FRA)	Renault–Elf–Gitane	+ 1' 58"
8	Mario Beccia (ITA)	Hoonved–Bottecchia	+ 2' 06"
9	Lucien Van Impe (BEL)	Metauro Mobili–Pinarello	+ 2' 32"
10	Czesław Lang (POL)	Gis Gelati–Olmo	+ 2' 37"

== Stage 9 ==
23 May 1982 — Agrigento to Palermo, 151 km (94 mi)

Stage 9 result

Rank	Rider	Team	Time
1	Giuseppe Saronni (ITA)	Del Tongo	3h 34' 27"
2	Pierino Gavazzi (ITA)	Atala	s.t.
3	Francesco Moser (ITA)	Famcucine	s.t.
4	Bernard Hinault (FRA)	Renault–Elf–Gitane	s.t.
5	Michael Wilson (AUS)	Alfa Lum–Sauber	s.t.
6	Piero Ghibaudo (ITA)	Famcucine	s.t.
7	Salvatore Maccali (ITA)	Alfa Lum–Sauber	s.t.
8	Bernard Gavillet (SUI)	Royal–Wrangler	s.t.
9	Giuseppe Martinelli (ITA)	Selle San Marco–Wilier Triestina	s.t.
10	Eddy Schepers (BEL)	Gis Gelati–Olmo	s.t.

General classification after Stage 9

Rank	Rider	Team	Time
1	Francesco Moser (ITA)	Famcucine	41h 31' 48"
2	Bernard Hinault (FRA)	Renault–Elf–Gitane	+ 6"
3	Giuseppe Saronni (ITA)	Del Tongo	+ 24"
4	Silvano Contini (ITA)	Bianchi–Piaggio	s.t.
5	Tommy Prim (SWE)	Bianchi–Piaggio	+ 37"
6	Fabrizio Verza (ITA)	Gis Gelati–Olmo	+ 1' 56"
7	Laurent Fignon (FRA)	Renault–Elf–Gitane	+ 2' 08"
8	Mario Beccia (ITA)	Hoonved–Bottecchia	+ 2' 16"
9	Lucien Van Impe (BEL)	Metauro Mobili–Pinarello	+ 2' 42"
10	Czesław Lang (POL)	Gis Gelati–Olmo	+ 2' 47"

== Stage 10 ==
24 May 1982 — Cefalù to Messina, 197 km (122 mi)

Stage 10 result

Rank	Rider	Team	Time
1	Urs Freuler (SUI)	Atala	5h 30' 10"
2	Guido Bontempi (ITA)	Inoxpran	s.t.
3	Francesco Moser (ITA)	Famcucine	s.t.
4	Paolo Rosola (ITA)	Atala	s.t.
5	Noël Dejonckheere (BEL)	Gis Gelati–Olmo	s.t.
6	Giuseppe Martinelli (ITA)	Selle San Marco–Wilier Triestina	s.t.
7	Silvestro Milani (ITA)	Hoonved–Bottecchia	s.t.
8	Pierangelo Bincoletto (ITA)	Sammontana–Benotto	s.t.
9	Nazzareno Berto (ITA)	Metauro Mobili–Pinarello	s.t.
10	Luigi Ferreri (ITA)	Hoonved–Bottecchia	s.t.

General classification after Stage 10

Rank	Rider	Team	Time
1	Francesco Moser (ITA)	Famcucine	47h 01' 48"
2	Bernard Hinault (FRA)	Renault–Elf–Gitane	+ 16"
3	Giuseppe Saronni (ITA)	Del Tongo	+ 34"
4	Silvano Contini (ITA)	Bianchi–Piaggio	s.t.
5	Tommy Prim (SWE)	Bianchi–Piaggio	+ 47"
6	Fabrizio Verza (ITA)	Gis Gelati–Olmo	+ 2' 06"
7	Laurent Fignon (FRA)	Renault–Elf–Gitane	+ 2' 18"
8	Mario Beccia (ITA)	Hoonved–Bottecchia	+ 2' 26"
9	Lucien Van Impe (BEL)	Metauro Mobili–Pinarello	+ 2' 52"
10	Czesław Lang (POL)	Gis Gelati–Olmo	+ 2' 57"

== Stage 11 ==
25 May 1982 — Palmi to Camigliatello Silano, 229 km (142 mi)

Stage 11 result

Rank	Rider	Team	Time
1	Bernard Becaas (FRA)	Renault–Elf–Gitane	6h 15' 46"
2	Giovanni Renosto (ITA)	Atala	+ 3"
3	Davide Cassani (ITA)	Termolan	+ 9"
4	Giuseppe Saronni (ITA)	Del Tongo	+ 1' 26"
5	Tommy Prim (SWE)	Bianchi–Piaggio	+ 1' 28"
6	Juan Fernández (ESP)	Kelme–Merckx	s.t.
7	Lucien Van Impe (BEL)	Metauro Mobili–Pinarello	s.t.
8	Alessandro Paganessi (ITA)	Bianchi–Piaggio	s.t.
9	Francesco Moser (ITA)	Famcucine	s.t.
10	Franco Conti (ITA)	Selle San Marco–Wilier Triestina	s.t.

General classification after Stage 11

Rank	Rider	Team	Time
1	Francesco Moser (ITA)	Famcucine	53h 19' 02"
2	Bernard Hinault (FRA)	Renault–Elf–Gitane	+ 16"
3	Giuseppe Saronni (ITA)	Del Tongo	+ 27"
4	Silvano Contini (ITA)	Bianchi–Piaggio	+ 34"
5	Tommy Prim (SWE)	Bianchi–Piaggio	+ 47"
6	Fabrizio Verza (ITA)	Gis Gelati–Olmo	+ 2' 06"
7	Mario Beccia (ITA)	Hoonved–Bottecchia	+ 2' 26"
8	Lucien Van Impe (BEL)	Metauro Mobili–Pinarello	+ 2' 52"
9	Alessandro Paganessi (ITA)	Bianchi–Piaggio	+ 2' 59"
10	Czesław Lang (POL)	Gis Gelati–Olmo	+ 3' 12"

== Rest day 2 ==
26 May 1982
