= 1981 Giro d'Italia, Stage 11 to Stage 22 =

Cycling race stages

The 1981 Giro d'Italia was the 64th edition of the Giro d'Italia, one of cycling's Grand Tours. The Giro began in Trieste, with a prologue individual time trial on 13 May, and Stage 11 occurred on 26 May with a stage from Cascia. The race finished in Verona on 7 June.

== Stage 11 ==
26 May 1981 — Cascia to Arezzo, 199 km (124 mi)

Stage 11 result

Rank	Rider	Team	Time
1	Giovanni Renosto (ITA)	Magniflex–Olmo	5h 18' 43"
2	Enrico Maestrelli (ITA)	Selle San Marco–Gabrielli	+ 1"
3	Thierry Bolle (SUI)	Cilo–Aufina	+ 2"
4	Claudio Torelli (ITA)	Famcucine–Campagnolo	s.t.
5	Emanuele Bombini (ITA)	Hoonved–Bottecchia–Herdal	s.t.
6	Aldo Donadello (ITA)	Bianchi–Piaggio	s.t.
7	Fulvio Bertacco (ITA)	Sammontana–Benotto	s.t.
8	Erwin Lienhard (SUI)	Cilo–Aufina	s.t.
9	Antonio D'alonzo (ITA)	Selle San Marco–Gabrielli	+ 6"
10	Glauco Santoni (ITA)	Famcucine–Campagnolo	s.t.

General classification after Stage 11

Rank	Rider	Team	Time
1	Giuseppe Saronni (ITA)	Gis Gelati–Campagnolo	58h 26' 17"
2	Claudio Bortolotto (ITA)	Santini–Selle Italia	+ 22"
3	Gianbattista Baronchelli (ITA)	Bianchi–Piaggio	+ 31"
4	Alfio Vandi (ITA)	Selle San Marco–Gabrielli	+ 49"
5	Silvano Contini (ITA)	Bianchi–Piaggio	s.t.
6	Giovanni Battaglin (ITA)	Inoxpran	+ 50"
7	Tommy Prim (SWE)	Bianchi–Piaggio	+ 1' 04"
8	Josef Fuchs (SUI)	Cilo–Aufina	+ 1' 23"
9	Roberto Visentini (ITA)	Sammontana–Benotto	+ 1' 32"
10	Beat Breu (SUI)	Cilo–Aufina	+ 1' 33"

== Stage 12 ==
27 May 1981 — Arezzo to Livorno Montenero, 224 km (139 mi)

Stage 12 result

Rank	Rider	Team	Time
1	Moreno Argentin (ITA)	Sammontana–Benotto	6h 09' 22"
2	Giuseppe Saronni (ITA)	Gis Gelati–Campagnolo	+ 2"
3	Giovanni Mantovani (ITA)	Hoonved–Bottecchia–Herdal	s.t.
4	Tommy Prim (SWE)	Bianchi–Piaggio	s.t.
5	Pierino Gavazzi (ITA)	Magniflex–Olmo	s.t.
6	Claudio Bortolotto (ITA)	Santini–Selle Italia	s.t.
7	Benny Schepmans (BEL)	Safir–Ludo–Galli	s.t.
8	Serge Demierre (SUI)	Cilo–Aufina	s.t.
9	Gianbattista Baronchelli (ITA)	Bianchi–Piaggio	s.t.
10	Giuseppe Martinelli (ITA)	Santini–Selle Italia	s.t.

General classification after Stage 12

Rank	Rider	Team	Time
1	Giuseppe Saronni (ITA)	Gis Gelati–Campagnolo	64h 35' 21"
2	Claudio Bortolotto (ITA)	Santini–Selle Italia	+ 42"
3	Gianbattista Baronchelli (ITA)	Bianchi–Piaggio	+ 51"
4	Alfio Vandi (ITA)	Selle San Marco–Gabrielli	+ 1' 09"
5	Silvano Contini (ITA)	Bianchi–Piaggio	s.t.
6	Giovanni Battaglin (ITA)	Inoxpran	+ 1' 10"
7	Tommy Prim (SWE)	Bianchi–Piaggio	+ 1' 24"
8	Josef Fuchs (SUI)	Cilo–Aufina	+ 1' 40"
9	Roberto Visentini (ITA)	Sammontana–Benotto	+ 1' 52"
10	Beat Breu (SUI)	Cilo–Aufina	+ 1' 53"

== Stage 13 ==
28 May 1981 — Empoli to Montecatini Terme, 35 km (22 mi) (ITT)

Stage 13 result

Rank	Rider	Team	Time
1	Knut Knudsen (NOR)	Bianchi–Piaggio	45' 10"
2	Roberto Visentini (ITA)	Sammontana–Benotto	+ 1' 00"
3	Daniel Gisiger (SUI)	Cilo–Aufina	+ 1' 10"
4	Tommy Prim (SWE)	Bianchi–Piaggio	+ 1' 30"
5	Silvano Contini (ITA)	Bianchi–Piaggio	s.t.
6	Roy Schuiten (NED)	Kotter's–GBC	+ 1' 32"
7	Giovanni Battaglin (ITA)	Inoxpran	+ 2' 00"
8	Serge Demierre (SUI)	Cilo–Aufina	+ 2' 15"
9	Gianbattista Baronchelli (ITA)	Bianchi–Piaggio	+ 2' 35"
10	Francesco Moser (ITA)	Famcucine–Campagnolo	+ 2' 37"

General classification after Stage 13

Rank	Rider	Team	Time
1	Roberto Visentini (ITA)	Sammontana–Benotto	65h 23' 03"
2	Silvano Contini (ITA)	Bianchi–Piaggio	+ 7"
3	Tommy Prim (SWE)	Bianchi–Piaggio	+ 22"
4	Giuseppe Saronni (ITA)	Gis Gelati–Campagnolo	+ 23"
5	Giovanni Battaglin (ITA)	Inoxpran	+ 38"
6	Gianbattista Baronchelli (ITA)	Bianchi–Piaggio	+ 54"
7	Josef Fuchs (SUI)	Cilo–Aufina	+ 1' 51"
8	Claudio Bortolotto (ITA)	Santini–Selle Italia	+ 2' 17"
9	Alfio Vandi (ITA)	Selle San Marco–Gabrielli	+ 2' 21"
10	Knut Knudsen (NOR)	Bianchi–Piaggio	+ 2' 35"

== Stage 14 ==
29 May 1981 — Montecatini Terme to Salsomaggiore Terme, 224 km (139 mi)

Stage 14 result

Rank	Rider	Team	Time
1	Francesco Moser (ITA)	Famcucine–Campagnolo	5h 48' 56"
2	Silvano Contini (ITA)	Bianchi–Piaggio	+ 1' 06"
3	Giovanni Battaglin (ITA)	Inoxpran	s.t.
4	Claudio Bortolotto (ITA)	Santini–Selle Italia	s.t.
5	Luciano Rui (ITA)	Hoonved–Bottecchia–Herdal	s.t.
6	Tommy Prim (SWE)	Bianchi–Piaggio	s.t.
7	Jean-Philippe Vandenbrande (BEL)	Safir–Ludo–Galli	+ 1' 18"
8	Riccardo Magrini (ITA)	Santini–Selle Italia	s.t.
9	Dietrich Thurau (FRG)	Kotter's–GBC	s.t.
10	Alfredo Chinetti (ITA)	Inoxpran	s.t.

General classification after Stage 14

Rank	Rider	Team	Time
1	Silvano Contini (ITA)	Bianchi–Piaggio	71h 12' 52"
2	Roberto Visentini (ITA)	Sammontana–Benotto	+ 25"
3	Tommy Prim (SWE)	Bianchi–Piaggio	+ 35"
4	Giovanni Battaglin (ITA)	Inoxpran	+ 41"
5	Giuseppe Saronni (ITA)	Gis Gelati–Campagnolo	+ 48"
6	Gianbattista Baronchelli (ITA)	Bianchi–Piaggio	+ 1' 19"
7	Josef Fuchs (SUI)	Cilo–Aufina	+ 2' 16"
8	Claudio Bortolotto (ITA)	Santini–Selle Italia	+ 2' 30"
9	Alfio Vandi (ITA)	Selle San Marco–Gabrielli	+ 2' 46"
10	Knut Knudsen (NOR)	Bianchi–Piaggio	+ 3' 00"

== Stage 15 ==
30 May 1981 — Salsomaggiore Terme to Pavia, 198 km (123 mi)

Stage 15 result

Rank	Rider	Team	Time
1	Daniel Gisiger (SUI)	Cilo–Aufina	5h 08' 48"
2	Giancarlo Casiraghi (ITA)	Magniflex–Olmo	s.t.
3	Serge Parsani (ITA)	Bianchi–Piaggio	+ 19"
4	Giovanni Moro (ITA)	Hoonved–Bottecchia–Herdal	s.t.
5	Giuseppe Passuello (ITA)	Gis Gelati–Campagnolo	+ 2' 18"
6	Eugenio Herranz (ESP)	Zor–Helios–Novostil	+ 2' 19"
7	Sergio Santimaria (ITA)	Selle San Marco–Gabrielli	s.t.
8	Salvatore Maccali (ITA)	Sammontana–Benotto	s.t.
9	Jean-Marie Wampers (BEL)	Santini–Selle Italia	+ 11' 53"
10	Giovanni Mantovani (ITA)	Hoonved–Bottecchia–Herdal	+ 11' 54"

General classification after Stage 15

Rank	Rider	Team	Time
1	Silvano Contini (ITA)	Bianchi–Piaggio	76h 33' 34"
2	Roberto Visentini (ITA)	Sammontana–Benotto	+ 25"
3	Tommy Prim (SWE)	Bianchi–Piaggio	+ 35"
4	Giovanni Battaglin (ITA)	Inoxpran	+ 41"
5	Giuseppe Saronni (ITA)	Gis Gelati–Campagnolo	+ 48"
6	Gianbattista Baronchelli (ITA)	Bianchi–Piaggio	+ 1' 19"
7	Josef Fuchs (SUI)	Cilo–Aufina	+ 2' 16"
8	Claudio Bortolotto (ITA)	Santini–Selle Italia	+ 2' 30"
9	Alfio Vandi (ITA)	Selle San Marco–Gabrielli	+ 2' 46"
10	Knut Knudsen (NOR)	Bianchi–Piaggio	+ 3' 00"

== Stage 16 ==
31 May 1981 — Milan to Mantua, 173 km (107 mi)

Stage 16 result

Rank	Rider	Team	Time
1	Claudio Torelli (ITA)	Famcucine–Campagnolo	4h 46' 35"
2	Dante Morandi (ITA)	Famcucine–Campagnolo	s.t.
3	Alfredo Chinetti (ITA)	Inoxpran	s.t.
4	Mario Noris (ITA)	Magniflex–Olmo	s.t.
5	Giuseppe Martinelli (ITA)	Santini–Selle Italia	s.t.
6	Giovanni Mantovani (ITA)	Hoonved–Bottecchia–Herdal	s.t.
7	Pierangelo Bincoletto (ITA)	Sammontana–Benotto	s.t.
8	Giuseppe Passuello (ITA)	Gis Gelati–Campagnolo	s.t.
9	Josef Fuchs (SUI)	Cilo–Aufina	s.t.
10	Jørgen Marcussen (DEN)	Inoxpran	s.t.

General classification after Stage 16

Rank	Rider	Team	Time
1	Silvano Contini (ITA)	Bianchi–Piaggio	81h 21' 42"
2	Roberto Visentini (ITA)	Sammontana–Benotto	+ 25"
3	Tommy Prim (SWE)	Bianchi–Piaggio	+ 35"
4	Giovanni Battaglin (ITA)	Inoxpran	+ 41"
5	Josef Fuchs (SUI)	Cilo–Aufina	+ 43"
6	Giuseppe Saronni (ITA)	Gis Gelati–Campagnolo	+ 48"
7	Gianbattista Baronchelli (ITA)	Bianchi–Piaggio	+ 1' 19"
8	Claudio Bortolotto (ITA)	Santini–Selle Italia	+ 2' 30"
9	Alfio Vandi (ITA)	Selle San Marco–Gabrielli	+ 2' 46"
10	Knut Knudsen (NOR)	Bianchi–Piaggio	+ 3' 00"

== Stage 17 ==
1 June 1981 — Mantua to Borno, 215 km (134 mi)

Stage 17 result

Rank	Rider	Team	Time
1	Benedetto Patellaro (ITA)	Hoonved–Bottecchia–Herdal	6h 05' 05"
2	Faustino Rupérez (ESP)	Zor–Helios–Novostil	+ 2' 55"
3	Claudio Bortolotto (ITA)	Santini–Selle Italia	+ 4' 56"
4	Tommy Prim (SWE)	Bianchi–Piaggio	+ 4' 58"
5	Giuseppe Saronni (ITA)	Gis Gelati–Campagnolo	+ 5' 23"
6	Gianbattista Baronchelli (ITA)	Bianchi–Piaggio	s.t.
7	Silvano Contini (ITA)	Bianchi–Piaggio	s.t.
8	Roberto Visentini (ITA)	Sammontana–Benotto	+ 5' 24"
9	Wladimiro Panizza (ITA)	Gis Gelati–Campagnolo	s.t.
10	Mario Beccia (ITA)	Santini–Selle Italia	s.t.

General classification after Stage 17

Rank	Rider	Team	Time
1	Silvano Contini (ITA)	Bianchi–Piaggio	87h 32' 10"
2	Tommy Prim (SWE)	Bianchi–Piaggio	+ 10"
3	Roberto Visentini (ITA)	Sammontana–Benotto	+ 26"
4	Giovanni Battaglin (ITA)	Inoxpran	+ 43"
5	Giuseppe Saronni (ITA)	Gis Gelati–Campagnolo	+ 48"
6	Gianbattista Baronchelli (ITA)	Bianchi–Piaggio	+ 1' 19"
7	Claudio Bortolotto (ITA)	Santini–Selle Italia	+ 1' 53"
8	Josef Fuchs (SUI)	Cilo–Aufina	+ 2' 04"
9	Alfio Vandi (ITA)	Selle San Marco–Gabrielli	+ 2' 48"
10	Wladimiro Panizza (ITA)	Gis Gelati–Campagnolo	+ 3' 29"

== Stage 18 ==
2 June 1981 — Borno to Dimaro, 127 km (79 mi)

Stage 18 result

Rank	Rider	Team	Time
1	Miguel María Lasa (ESP)	Zor–Helios–Novostil	3h 39' 08"
2	Silvano Contini (ITA)	Bianchi–Piaggio	+ 1"
3	Leonardo Natale (ITA)	Magniflex–Olmo	s.t.
4	Eduardo Chozas (ESP)	Zor–Helios–Novostil	+ 7"
5	Gianbattista Baronchelli (ITA)	Bianchi–Piaggio	+ 21"
6	Tommy Prim (SWE)	Bianchi–Piaggio	+ 30"
7	Josef Fuchs (SUI)	Cilo–Aufina	+ 33"
8	Giovanni Battaglin (ITA)	Inoxpran	s.t.
9	Giuseppe Saronni (ITA)	Gis Gelati–Campagnolo	+ 35"
10	Alfio Vandi (ITA)	Selle San Marco–Gabrielli	s.t.

General classification after Stage 18

Rank	Rider	Team	Time
1	Silvano Contini (ITA)	Bianchi–Piaggio	91h 10' 49"
2	Tommy Prim (SWE)	Bianchi–Piaggio	+ 59"
3	Giovanni Battaglin (ITA)	Inoxpran	+ 1' 35"
4	Giuseppe Saronni (ITA)	Gis Gelati–Campagnolo	+ 1' 42"
5	Gianbattista Baronchelli (ITA)	Bianchi–Piaggio	+ 1' 59"
6	Josef Fuchs (SUI)	Cilo–Aufina	+ 2' 56"
7	Alfio Vandi (ITA)	Selle San Marco–Gabrielli	+ 3' 42"
8	Roberto Visentini (ITA)	Sammontana–Benotto	+ 5' 16"
9	Claudio Bortolotto (ITA)	Santini–Selle Italia	+ 6' 53"
10	Beat Breu (SUI)	Cilo–Aufina	+ 8' 35"

== Rest Day 3 ==
3 June 1981

== Stage 19 ==
4 June 1981 — Dimaro to San Vigilio di Marebbe, 208 km (129 mi)

Stage 19 result

Rank	Rider	Team	Time
1	Giovanni Battaglin (ITA)	Inoxpran	5h 41' 02"
2	Giuseppe Saronni (ITA)	Gis Gelati–Campagnolo	+ 10"
3	Josef Fuchs (SUI)	Cilo–Aufina	+ 11"
4	Tommy Prim (SWE)	Bianchi–Piaggio	s.t.
5	Roberto Visentini (ITA)	Sammontana–Benotto	+ 17"
6	Beat Breu (SUI)	Cilo–Aufina	+ 25"
7	Claudio Bortolotto (ITA)	Santini–Selle Italia	+ 41"
8	Erwin Lienhard (SUI)	Cilo–Aufina	+ 59"
9	Dietrich Thurau (FRG)	Kotter's–GBC	+ 1' 02"
10	Gianbattista Baronchelli (ITA)	Bianchi–Piaggio	s.t.

General classification after Stage 19

Rank	Rider	Team	Time
1	Silvano Contini (ITA)	Bianchi–Piaggio	96h 53' 03"
2	Giovanni Battaglin (ITA)	Inoxpran	+ 3"
3	Tommy Prim (SWE)	Bianchi–Piaggio	+ 8"
4	Giuseppe Saronni (ITA)	Gis Gelati–Campagnolo	+ 30"
5	Josef Fuchs (SUI)	Cilo–Aufina	+ 1' 55"
6	Gianbattista Baronchelli (ITA)	Bianchi–Piaggio	+ 1' 59"
7	Alfio Vandi (ITA)	Selle San Marco–Gabrielli	+ 3' 42"
8	Roberto Visentini (ITA)	Sammontana–Benotto	+ 4' 31"
9	Claudio Bortolotto (ITA)	Santini–Selle Italia	+ 6' 22"
10	Beat Breu (SUI)	Cilo–Aufina	+ 7' 58"

== Stage 20 ==
5 June 1981 — San Vigilio di Marebbe to Tre Cime di Lavaredo, 100 km (62 mi)

Stage 20 result

Rank	Rider	Team	Time
1	Beat Breu (SUI)	Cilo–Aufina	2h 48' 32"
2	Josef Fuchs (SUI)	Cilo–Aufina	+ 10"
3	Giovanni Battaglin (ITA)	Inoxpran	+ 42"
4	Leonardo Natale (ITA)	Magniflex–Olmo	+ 52"
5	Guillermo de la Peña (ESP)	Zor–Helios–Novostil	+ 56"
6	Giuseppe Saronni (ITA)	Gis Gelati–Campagnolo	+ 1' 04"
7	Moreno Argentin (ITA)	Sammontana–Benotto	s.t.
8	Roberto Ceruti (ITA)	Gis Gelati–Campagnolo	+ 1' 17"
9	Tommy Prim (SWE)	Bianchi–Piaggio	s.t.
10	Roberto Visentini (ITA)	Sammontana–Benotto	+ 1' 26"

General classification after Stage 20

Rank	Rider	Team	Time
1	Giovanni Battaglin (ITA)	Inoxpran	99h 42' 10"
2	Tommy Prim (SWE)	Bianchi–Piaggio	+ 50"
3	Giuseppe Saronni (ITA)	Gis Gelati–Campagnolo	+ 59"
4	Josef Fuchs (SUI)	Cilo–Aufina	+ 1' 10"
5	Silvano Contini (ITA)	Bianchi–Piaggio	+ 1' 44"
6	Roberto Visentini (ITA)	Sammontana–Benotto	+ 5' 22"
7	Alfio Vandi (ITA)	Selle San Marco–Gabrielli	+ 6' 13"
8	Beat Breu (SUI)	Cilo–Aufina	+ 6' 53"
9	Claudio Bortolotto (ITA)	Santini–Selle Italia	+ 7' 18"
10	Gianbattista Baronchelli (ITA)	Bianchi–Piaggio	+ 8' 43"

== Stage 21 ==
6 June 1981 — Auronzo di Cadore to Arzignano, 197 km (122 mi)

Stage 21 result

Rank	Rider	Team	Time
1	Pierino Gavazzi (ITA)	Magniflex–Olmo	4h 15' 22"
2	Giuseppe Saronni (ITA)	Gis Gelati–Campagnolo	s.t.
3	Francesco Moser (ITA)	Famcucine–Campagnolo	s.t.
4	Giovanni Mantovani (ITA)	Hoonved–Bottecchia–Herdal	s.t.
5	Benny Schepmans (BEL)	Safir–Ludo–Galli	s.t.
6	Willy Vigouroux (BEL)	Safir–Ludo–Galli	s.t.
7	Dante Morandi (ITA)	Famcucine–Campagnolo	s.t.
8	Giuseppe Martinelli (ITA)	Santini–Selle Italia	s.t.
9	Jean-Philippe Vandenbrande (BEL)	Safir–Ludo–Galli	s.t.
10	Paolo Rosola (ITA)	Magniflex–Olmo	s.t.

General classification after Stage 21

Rank	Rider	Team	Time
1	Giovanni Battaglin (ITA)	Inoxpran	103h 57' 32"
2	Giuseppe Saronni (ITA)	Gis Gelati–Campagnolo	+ 39"
3	Tommy Prim (SWE)	Bianchi–Piaggio	+ 50"
4	Josef Fuchs (SUI)	Cilo–Aufina	+ 1' 10"
5	Silvano Contini (ITA)	Bianchi–Piaggio	+ 1' 44"
6	Roberto Visentini (ITA)	Sammontana–Benotto	+ 5' 22"
7	Alfio Vandi (ITA)	Selle San Marco–Gabrielli	+ 6' 13"
8	Beat Breu (SUI)	Cilo–Aufina	+ 6' 53"
9	Claudio Bortolotto (ITA)	Santini–Selle Italia	+ 7' 18"
10	Gianbattista Baronchelli (ITA)	Bianchi–Piaggio	+ 8' 43"

== Stage 22 ==
7 June 1981 — Soave to Verona, 42 km (26 mi) (ITT)

Stage 22 result

Rank	Rider	Team	Time
1	Knut Knudsen (NOR)	Bianchi–Piaggio	51' 50"
2	Tommy Prim (SWE)	Bianchi–Piaggio	+ 1' 22"
3	Giovanni Battaglin (ITA)	Inoxpran	+ 1' 24"
4	Giuseppe Saronni (ITA)	Gis Gelati–Campagnolo	+ 1' 25"
5	Roberto Visentini (ITA)	Sammontana–Benotto	+ 1' 29"
6	Claudio Torelli (ITA)	Famcucine–Campagnolo	+ 1' 36"
7	Roy Schuiten (NED)	Kotter's–GBC	+ 1' 46"
8	Daniel Gisiger (SUI)	Cilo–Aufina	+ 2' 05"
9	Franco Conti (ITA)	Selle San Marco–Gabrielli	+ 2' 29"
10	Francesco Moser (ITA)	Famcucine–Campagnolo	+ 2' 32"

General classification after Stage 22

Rank	Rider	Team	Time
1	Giovanni Battaglin (ITA)	Inoxpran	104h 50' 36"
2	Tommy Prim (SWE)	Bianchi–Piaggio	+ 38"
3	Giuseppe Saronni (ITA)	Gis Gelati–Campagnolo	+ 50"
4	Silvano Contini (ITA)	Bianchi–Piaggio	+ 2' 59"
5	Josef Fuchs (SUI)	Cilo–Aufina	+ 3' 19"
6	Roberto Visentini (ITA)	Sammontana–Benotto	+ 5' 37"
7	Alfio Vandi (ITA)	Selle San Marco–Gabrielli	+ 9' 32"
8	Beat Breu (SUI)	Cilo–Aufina	+ 10' 02"
9	Claudio Bortolotto (ITA)	Santini–Selle Italia	+ 10' 12"
10	Gianbattista Baronchelli (ITA)	Bianchi–Piaggio	+ 12' 01"
