= 1980 Giro d'Italia, Prologue to Stage 11 =

Cycling race stages

The 1980 Giro d'Italia was the 63rd edition of the Giro d'Italia, one of cycling's Grand Tours. The Giro began in Genoa, with a prologue individual time trial on 15 May, and Stage 11 occurred on 27 May with a stage to Campotenese. The race finished in Milan on 7 June.

== Prologue ==
15 May 1980 — Genoa, 7 km (4.3 mi) (ITT)

Prologue result

Rank	Rider	Team	Time
1	Francesco Moser (ITA)	Sanson–Campagnolo	9' 13"
2	Knut Knudsen (NOR)	Bianchi–Piaggio	+ 4"
3	Bernard Hinault (FRA)	Renault–Gitane	+ 6"
4	Giuseppe Saronni (ITA)	Gis Gelati	+ 18"
5	Giovanni Battaglin (ITA)	Inoxpran	+ 22"
6	Tommy Prim (SWE)	Bianchi–Piaggio	+ 24"
7	Roy Schuiten (NED)	Inoxpran	+ 25"
8	Gregor Braun (FRG)	Sanson–Campagnolo	s.t.
9	Gianbattista Baronchelli (ITA)	Bianchi–Piaggio	s.t.
10	Claudio Torelli (ITA)	Bianchi–Piaggio	+ 28"

== Stage 1 ==
16 May 1980 — Genoa to Imperia, 123 km (76 mi)

Stage 1 result

Rank	Rider	Team	Time
1	Giuseppe Saronni (ITA)	Gis Gelati	2h 56' 23"
2	Giuseppe Martinelli (ITA)	San Giacomo	s.t.
3	Giovanni Mantovani (ITA)	Hoonved–Bottecchia	s.t.
4	Francesco Moser (ITA)	Sanson–Campagnolo	s.t.
5	Pierino Gavazzi (ITA)	Magniflex–Olmo	s.t.
6	Tommy Prim (SWE)	Bianchi–Piaggio	s.t.
7	Nazzareno Berto (ITA)	Inoxpran	s.t.
8	Dante Morandi (ITA)	Hoonved–Bottecchia	s.t.
9	Serge Demierre (SUI)	Cilo–Aufina	s.t.
10	Simone Fraccaro (ITA)	Gis Gelati	s.t.

General classification after Stage 1

Rank	Rider	Team	Time
1	Francesco Moser (ITA)	Sanson–Campagnolo	3h 05' 36"
2	Knut Knudsen (NOR)	Bianchi–Piaggio	+ 4"
3	Bernard Hinault (FRA)	Renault–Gitane	+ 6"
4	Giuseppe Saronni (ITA)	Gis Gelati	+ 18"
5	Giovanni Battaglin (ITA)	Inoxpran	+ 22"
6	Tommy Prim (SWE)	Bianchi–Piaggio	+ 24"
7	Roy Schuiten (NED)	Inoxpran	+ 25"
8	Gregor Braun (FRG)	Sanson–Campagnolo	s.t.
9	Gianbattista Baronchelli (ITA)	Bianchi–Piaggio	s.t.
10	Roberto Visentini (ITA)	San Giacomo	+ 29"

== Stage 2 ==
17 May 1980 — Imperia to Turin, 179 km (111 mi)

Stage 2 result

Rank	Rider	Team	Time
1	Giuseppe Saronni (ITA)	Gis Gelati	4h 45' 02"
2	Leonardo Mazzantini (ITA)	Sanson–Campagnolo	s.t.
3	Eddy Van Haerens (BEL)	Studio Casa–Fin–Italcasa–Colnago	s.t.
4	Francesco Moser (ITA)	Sanson–Campagnolo	s.t.
5	Pierino Gavazzi (ITA)	Magniflex–Olmo	s.t.
6	Giovanni Mantovani (ITA)	Hoonved–Bottecchia	s.t.
7	Roger De Cnijf (BEL)	Studio Casa–Fin–Italcasa–Colnago	s.t.
8	Peter Kehl (FRG)	Kondor	s.t.
9	Alfredo Chinetti (ITA)	Inoxpran	s.t.
10	Yvon Bertin (FRA)	Renault–Gitane	s.t.

General classification after Stage 2

Rank	Rider	Team	Time
1	Francesco Moser (ITA)	Sanson–Campagnolo	7h 50' 38"
2	Knut Knudsen (NOR)	Bianchi–Piaggio	+ 4"
3	Bernard Hinault (FRA)	Renault–Gitane	+ 6"
4	Giuseppe Saronni (ITA)	Gis Gelati	+ 16"
5	Giovanni Battaglin (ITA)	Inoxpran	+ 22"
6	Tommy Prim (SWE)	Bianchi–Piaggio	+ 24"
7	Roy Schuiten (NED)	Inoxpran	+ 25"
8	Gregor Braun (FRG)	Sanson–Campagnolo	s.t.
9	Gianbattista Baronchelli (ITA)	Bianchi–Piaggio	s.t.
10	Roberto Visentini (ITA)	San Giacomo	+ 29"

== Stage 3 ==
18 May 1980 — Turin to Parma, 243 km (151 mi)

Stage 3 result

Rank	Rider	Team	Time
1	Giuseppe Saronni (ITA)	Gis Gelati	6h 10' 47"
2	Giovanni Mantovani (ITA)	Hoonved–Bottecchia	s.t.
3	Eddy Van Haerens (BEL)	Studio Casa–Fin–Italcasa–Colnago	s.t.
4	Giuseppe Martinelli (ITA)	San Giacomo	s.t.
5	Peter Kehl (FRG)	Kondor	s.t.
6	Daniele Tinchella (ITA)	Kondor	s.t.
7	Yvon Bertin (FRA)	Renault–Gitane	s.t.
8	Serge Demierre (SUI)	Cilo–Aufina	s.t.
9	Francesco Moser (ITA)	Sanson–Campagnolo	s.t.
10	Luciano Borgognoni (ITA)	Hoonved–Bottecchia	s.t.

General classification after Stage 3

Rank	Rider	Team	Time
1	Francesco Moser (ITA)	Sanson–Campagnolo	14h 01' 25"
2	Knut Knudsen (NOR)	Bianchi–Piaggio	+ 4"
3	Bernard Hinault (FRA)	Renault–Gitane	+ 6"
4	Giuseppe Saronni (ITA)	Gis Gelati	+ 18"
5	Giovanni Battaglin (ITA)	Inoxpran	+ 22"
6	Tommy Prim (SWE)	Bianchi–Piaggio	+ 24"
7	Roy Schuiten (NED)	Inoxpran	+ 25"
8	Gregor Braun (FRG)	Sanson–Campagnolo	s.t.
9	Gianbattista Baronchelli (ITA)	Bianchi–Piaggio	s.t.
10	Roberto Visentini (ITA)	San Giacomo	+ 29"

== Stage 4 ==
19 May 1980 — Parma to Marina di Pisa, 193 km (120 mi)

Stage 4 result

Rank	Rider	Team	Time
1	Dante Morandi (ITA)	Hoonved–Bottecchia	4h 57' 27"
2	Giuseppe Martinelli (ITA)	San Giacomo	s.t.
3	Eddy Van Haerens (BEL)	Studio Casa–Fin–Italcasa–Colnago	s.t.
4	Roger De Cnijf (BEL)	Studio Casa–Fin–Italcasa–Colnago	s.t.
5	Giovanni Mantovani (ITA)	Hoonved–Bottecchia	s.t.
6	Yvon Bertin (FRA)	Renault–Gitane	s.t.
7	Leonardo Mazzantini (ITA)	Sanson–Campagnolo	s.t.
8	Daniele Tinchella (ITA)	Kondor	s.t.
9	Peter Kehl (FRG)	Kondor	s.t.
10	Nazzareno Berto (ITA)	Inoxpran	s.t.

General classification after Stage 4

Rank	Rider	Team	Time
1	Francesco Moser (ITA)	Sanson–Campagnolo	18h 58' 52"
2	Knut Knudsen (NOR)	Bianchi–Piaggio	+ 4"
3	Bernard Hinault (FRA)	Renault–Gitane	+ 6"
4	Giuseppe Saronni (ITA)	Gis Gelati	+ 18"
5	Giovanni Battaglin (ITA)	Inoxpran	+ 22"
6	Tommy Prim (SWE)	Bianchi–Piaggio	+ 24"
7	Roy Schuiten (NED)	Inoxpran	+ 25"
8	Gregor Braun (FRG)	Sanson–Campagnolo	s.t.
9	Gianbattista Baronchelli (ITA)	Bianchi–Piaggio	s.t.
10	Roberto Visentini (ITA)	San Giacomo	+ 29"

== Stage 5 ==
20 May 1980 — Pontedera to Pisa, 36 km (22 mi) (ITT)

Stage 5 result

Rank	Rider	Team	Time
1	Jørgen Marcussen (DEN)	Inoxpran	45' 07"
2	Bernard Hinault (FRA)	Renault–Gitane	+ 14"
3	Knut Knudsen (NOR)	Bianchi–Piaggio	+ 48"
4	Claudio Torelli (ITA)	Bianchi–Piaggio	+ 1' 04"
5	Roberto Visentini (ITA)	San Giacomo	+ 1' 11"
6	Francesco Moser (ITA)	Sanson–Campagnolo	+ 1' 14"
7	Hans Hindelang (FRG)	Kondor	+ 1' 16"
8	Bernard Quilfen (FRA)	Renault–Gitane	+ 1' 45"
9	Silvano Contini (ITA)	Bianchi–Piaggio	+ 2' 01"
10	Giuseppe Saronni (ITA)	Gis Gelati	+ 2' 05"

General classification after Stage 5

Rank	Rider	Team	Time
1	Bernard Hinault (FRA)	Renault–Gitane	19h 44' 19"
2	Knut Knudsen (NOR)	Bianchi–Piaggio	+ 32"
3	Francesco Moser (ITA)	Sanson–Campagnolo	+ 54"
4	Jørgen Marcussen (DEN)	Inoxpran	+ 1' 01"
5	Roberto Visentini (ITA)	San Giacomo	+ 1' 20"
6	Claudio Torelli (ITA)	Bianchi–Piaggio	+ 1' 44"
7	Giuseppe Saronni (ITA)	Gis Gelati	+ 2' 03"
8	Silvano Contini (ITA)	Bianchi–Piaggio	+ 2' 15"
9	Gianbattista Baronchelli (ITA)	Bianchi–Piaggio	+ 2' 21"
10	Gregor Braun (FRG)	Sanson–Campagnolo	+ 2' 35"

== Rest day ==
21 May 1980

== Stage 6 ==
22 May 1980 — Rio Marina to Portoferraio, 126 km (78 mi)

Stage 6 result

Rank	Rider	Team	Time
1	Carmelo Barone (ITA)	Sanson–Campagnolo	3h 13' 35"
2	Gianbattista Baronchelli (ITA)	Bianchi–Piaggio	s.t.
3	Bernt Johansson (SWE)	Magniflex–Olmo	+ 1"
4	Mario Beccia (ITA)	Hoonved–Bottecchia	s.t.
5	Giovanni Mantovani (ITA)	Hoonved–Bottecchia	+ 1' 18"
6	Francesco Moser (ITA)	Sanson–Campagnolo	s.t.
7	Tommy Prim (SWE)	Bianchi–Piaggio	s.t.
8	Pierino Gavazzi (ITA)	Magniflex–Olmo	s.t.
9	Giuseppe Fatato (ITA)	Famcucine	s.t.
10	Alfredo Chinetti (ITA)	Inoxpran	s.t.

General classification after Stage 6

Rank	Rider	Team	Time
1	Bernard Hinault (FRA)	Renault–Gitane	22h 59' 12"
2	Knut Knudsen (NOR)	Bianchi–Piaggio	+ 32"
3	Francesco Moser (ITA)	Sanson–Campagnolo	+ 54"
4	Gianbattista Baronchelli (ITA)	Bianchi–Piaggio	+ 1' 03"
5	Roberto Visentini (ITA)	San Giacomo	+ 1' 20"
6	Claudio Torelli (ITA)	Bianchi–Piaggio	+ 1' 44"
7	Bernt Johansson (SWE)	Magniflex–Olmo	+ 1' 53"
8	Giuseppe Saronni (ITA)	Gis Gelati	+ 2' 03"
9	Mario Beccia (ITA)	Hoonved–Bottecchia	+ 2' 08"
10	Silvano Contini (ITA)	Bianchi–Piaggio	+ 2' 15"

== Stage 7 ==
23 May 1980 — Castiglione della Pescaia to Orvieto, 199 km (124 mi)

Stage 7 result

Rank	Rider	Team	Time
1	Silvano Contini (ITA)	Bianchi–Piaggio	6h 10' 46"
2	Juan Fernández (ESP)	Zor–Vereco	+ 1"
3	Faustino Rupérez (ESP)	Zor–Vereco	+ 5"
4	Giovanni Battaglin (ITA)	Inoxpran	+ 11"
5	Alfredo Chinetti (ITA)	Inoxpran	s.t.
6	Gottfried Schmutz (SUI)	Cilo–Aufina	s.t.
7	Roberto Visentini (ITA)	San Giacomo	s.t.
8	Ronald De Witte (BEL)	Sanson–Campagnolo	+ 32"
9	Ángel Arroyo (ESP)	Zor–Vereco	+ 59"
10	Leonardo Natale (ITA)	Magniflex–Olmo	+ 1' 19"

General classification after Stage 7

Rank	Rider	Team	Time
1	Roberto Visentini (ITA)	San Giacomo	29h 11' 29"
2	Silvano Contini (ITA)	Bianchi–Piaggio	+ 44"
3	Faustino Rupérez (ESP)	Zor–Vereco	+ 1' 15"
4	Giovanni Battaglin (ITA)	Inoxpran	+ 2' 13"
5	Wladimiro Panizza (ITA)	Gis Gelati	+ 2' 27"
6	Ronald De Witte (BEL)	Sanson–Campagnolo	+ 2' 31"
7	Gottfried Schmutz (SUI)	Cilo–Aufina	+ 2' 56"
8	Bernard Hinault (FRA)	Renault–Gitane	+ 2' 58"
9	Juan Fernández (ESP)	Zor–Vereco	+ 3' 16"
10	Knut Knudsen (NOR)	Bianchi–Piaggio	+ 3' 30"

== Stage 8 ==
24 May 1980 — Orvieto to Fiuggi, 216 km (134 mi)

Stage 8 result

Rank	Rider	Team	Time
1	Juan Fernández (ESP)	Zor–Vereco	5h 35' 22"
2	Giovanni Mantovani (ITA)	Hoonved–Bottecchia	+ 2"
3	Pierino Gavazzi (ITA)	Magniflex–Olmo	s.t.
4	Giuseppe Saronni (ITA)	Gis Gelati	s.t.
5	Palmiro Masciarelli (ITA)	Sanson–Campagnolo	s.t.
6	Miguel María Lasa (ESP)	Zor–Vereco	s.t.
7	Álvaro Crespi (ITA)	Hoonved–Bottecchia	s.t.
8	Francesco Moser (ITA)	Sanson–Campagnolo	s.t.
9	Tommy Prim (SWE)	Bianchi–Piaggio	s.t.
10	Mario Beccia (ITA)	Hoonved–Bottecchia	s.t.

General classification after Stage 8

Rank	Rider	Team	Time
1	Roberto Visentini (ITA)	San Giacomo	34h 46' 53"
2	Silvano Contini (ITA)	Bianchi–Piaggio	+ 44"
3	Faustino Rupérez (ESP)	Zor–Vereco	+ 1' 16"
4	Giovanni Battaglin (ITA)	Inoxpran	+ 2' 13"
5	Wladimiro Panizza (ITA)	Gis Gelati	+ 2' 27"
6	Ronald De Witte (BEL)	Sanson–Campagnolo	+ 2' 31"
7	Gottfried Schmutz (SUI)	Cilo–Aufina	+ 2' 56"
8	Bernard Hinault (FRA)	Renault–Gitane	+ 2' 58"
9	Juan Fernández (ESP)	Zor–Vereco	+ 3' 14"
10	Knut Knudsen (NOR)	Bianchi–Piaggio	+ 3' 30"

== Stage 9 ==
25 May 1980 — Fiuggi to Sorrento, 247 km (153 mi)

Stage 9 result

Rank	Rider	Team	Time
1	Giovanni Mantovani (ITA)	Hoonved–Bottecchia	6h 49' 00"
2	Pierino Gavazzi (ITA)	Magniflex–Olmo	s.t.
3	Fiorenzo Favero (ITA)	Hoonved–Bottecchia	s.t.
4	Giuseppe Martinelli (ITA)	San Giacomo	s.t.
5	Francesco Moser (ITA)	Sanson–Campagnolo	s.t.
6	Giuseppe Saronni (ITA)	Gis Gelati	s.t.
7	Bernard Hinault (FRA)	Renault–Gitane	s.t.
8	Giuseppe Fatato (ITA)	Famcucine	s.t.
9	Tommy Prim (SWE)	Bianchi–Piaggio	s.t.
10	Jean-René Bernaudeau (FRA)	Renault–Gitane	s.t.

General classification after Stage 9

Rank	Rider	Team	Time
1	Roberto Visentini (ITA)	San Giacomo	41h 35' 53"
2	Silvano Contini (ITA)	Bianchi–Piaggio	+ 44"
3	Faustino Rupérez (ESP)	Zor–Vereco	+ 1' 16"
4	Giovanni Battaglin (ITA)	Inoxpran	+ 2' 13"
5	Wladimiro Panizza (ITA)	Gis Gelati	+ 2' 27"
6	Ronald De Witte (BEL)	Sanson–Campagnolo	+ 2' 31"
7	Gottfried Schmutz (SUI)	Cilo–Aufina	+ 2' 56"
8	Bernard Hinault (FRA)	Renault–Gitane	+ 2' 58"
9	Juan Fernández (ESP)	Zor–Vereco	+ 3' 14"
10	Knut Knudsen (NOR)	Bianchi–Piaggio	+ 3' 30"

== Stage 10 ==
26 May 1980 — Sorrento to Palinuro, 177 km (110 mi)

Stage 10 result

Rank	Rider	Team	Time
1	Giovanni Mantovani (ITA)	Hoonved–Bottecchia	4h 59' 33"
2	Tommy Prim (SWE)	Bianchi–Piaggio	s.t.
3	Wladimiro Panizza (ITA)	Gis Gelati	s.t.
4	Palmiro Masciarelli (ITA)	Sanson–Campagnolo	s.t.
5	Knut Knudsen (NOR)	Bianchi–Piaggio	+ 4"
6	Giuseppe Saronni (ITA)	Gis Gelati	+ 16"
7	Francesco Moser (ITA)	Sanson–Campagnolo	s.t.
8	Alfredo Chinetti (ITA)	Inoxpran	+ 19"
9	Pierino Gavazzi (ITA)	Magniflex–Olmo	s.t.
10	Gianbattista Baronchelli (ITA)	Bianchi–Piaggio	s.t.

General classification after Stage 10

Rank	Rider	Team	Time
1	Roberto Visentini (ITA)	San Giacomo	46h 35' 57"
2	Silvano Contini (ITA)	Bianchi–Piaggio	+ 44"
3	Faustino Rupérez (ESP)	Zor–Vereco	+ 1' 22"
4	Wladimiro Panizza (ITA)	Gis Gelati	+ 2' 06"
5	Giovanni Battaglin (ITA)	Inoxpran	+ 2' 13"
6	Ronald De Witte (BEL)	Sanson–Campagnolo	+ 2' 37"
7	Gottfried Schmutz (SUI)	Cilo–Aufina	+ 2' 56"
8	Bernard Hinault (FRA)	Renault–Gitane	+ 3' 13"
9	Knut Knudsen (NOR)	Bianchi–Piaggio	+ 3' 14"
10	Juan Fernández (ESP)	Zor–Vereco	+ 3' 14"

== Stage 11 ==
27 May 1980 — Palinuro to Campotenese, 145 km (90 mi)

Stage 11 result

Rank	Rider	Team	Time
1	Gianbattista Baronchelli (ITA)	Bianchi–Piaggio	4h 16' 41"
2	Bernt Johansson (SWE)	Magniflex–Olmo	s.t.
3	Wladimiro Panizza (ITA)	Gis Gelati	s.t.
4	Mario Beccia (ITA)	Hoonved–Bottecchia	s.t.
5	Francesco Moser (ITA)	Sanson–Campagnolo	s.t.
6	Bernard Hinault (FRA)	Renault–Gitane	s.t.
7	Giuseppe Saronni (ITA)	Gis Gelati	s.t.
8	Miguel María Lasa (ESP)	Zor–Vereco	s.t.
9	Gottfried Schmutz (SUI)	Cilo–Aufina	s.t.
10	Roberto Ceruti (ITA)	Gis Gelati	s.t.

General classification after Stage 11

Rank	Rider	Team	Time
1	Roberto Visentini (ITA)	San Giacomo	50h 52' 51"
2	Silvano Contini (ITA)	Bianchi–Piaggio	+ 44"
3	Faustino Rupérez (ESP)	Zor–Vereco	+ 1' 22"
4	Wladimiro Panizza (ITA)	Gis Gelati	+ 1' 53"
5	Giovanni Battaglin (ITA)	Inoxpran	+ 2' 13"
6	Gottfried Schmutz (SUI)	Cilo–Aufina	+ 2' 56"
7	Bernard Hinault (FRA)	Renault–Gitane	+ 2' 58"
8	Knut Knudsen (NOR)	Bianchi–Piaggio	+ 3' 13"
9	Gianbattista Baronchelli (ITA)	Bianchi–Piaggio	+ 3' 46"
10	Francesco Moser (ITA)	Sanson–Campagnolo	+ 3' 47"
