= 1982 Giro d'Italia, Stage 12 to Stage 22 =

Cycling race stages

The 1982 Giro d'Italia was the 65th edition of the Giro d'Italia, one of cycling's Grand Tours. The Giro began in Milan, with a prologue team time trial on 13 May, and Stage 12 occurred on 27 May with a stage from Cava de' Tirreni. The race finished in Turin on 6 June.

== Stage 12 ==
27 May 1982 — Cava de' Tirreni to Campitello Matese, 171 km (106 mi)

Stage 12 result

Rank	Rider	Team	Time
1	Bernard Hinault (FRA)	Renault–Elf–Gitane	4h 48' 01"
2	Mario Beccia (ITA)	Hoonved–Bottecchia	+ 1"
3	Tommy Prim (SWE)	Bianchi–Piaggio	+ 21"
4	Alfio Vandi (ITA)	Selle San Marco–Wilier Triestina	s.t.
5	Marco Groppo (ITA)	Metauro Mobili–Pinarello	+ 47"
6	Faustino Rupérez (ESP)	Zor–Helios–Gemeaz Cusin	+ 55"
7	Gianbattista Baronchelli (ITA)	Bianchi–Piaggio	s.t.
8	Lucien Van Impe (BEL)	Metauro Mobili–Pinarello	+ 1' 17"
9	Silvano Contini (ITA)	Bianchi–Piaggio	s.t.
10	Fabrizio Verza (ITA)	Gis Gelati–Olmo	+ 1' 54"

General classification after Stage 12

Rank	Rider	Team	Time
1	Bernard Hinault (FRA)	Renault–Elf–Gitane	58h 06' 49"
2	Tommy Prim (SWE)	Bianchi–Piaggio	+ 1' 12"
3	Silvano Contini (ITA)	Bianchi–Piaggio	+ 2' 05"
4	Mario Beccia (ITA)	Hoonved–Bottecchia	+ 2' 21"
5	Francesco Moser (ITA)	Famcucine	+ 2' 29"
6	Giuseppe Saronni (ITA)	Del Tongo	+ 2' 56"
7	Fabrizio Verza (ITA)	Gis Gelati–Olmo	+ 4' 14"
8	Lucien Van Impe (BEL)	Metauro Mobili–Pinarello	+ 4' 23"
9	Alfio Vandi (ITA)	Selle San Marco–Wilier Triestina	+ 4' 49"
10	Gianbattista Baronchelli (ITA)	Bianchi–Piaggio	+ 5' 26"

== Stage 13 ==
28 May 1982 — Campitello Matese to Pescara, 164 km (102 mi)

Stage 13 result

Rank	Rider	Team	Time
1	Silvano Contini (ITA)	Bianchi–Piaggio	4h 50' 13"
2	Vicente Belda (ESP)	Kelme–Merckx	s.t.
3	Marco Groppo (ITA)	Metauro Mobili–Pinarello	s.t.
4	Palmiro Masciarelli (ITA)	Famcucine	+ 53"
5	Riccardo Magrini (ITA)	Metauro Mobili–Pinarello	+ 1' 00"
6	Francesco Moser (ITA)	Famcucine	+ 1' 04"
7	Luciano Rabottini (ITA)	Gis Gelati–Olmo	s.t.
8	Sergio Santimaria (ITA)	Selle San Marco–Wilier Triestina	s.t.
9	Giuseppe Saronni (ITA)	Del Tongo	s.t.
10	Bruno Wolfer (SUI)	Royal–Wrangler	s.t.

General classification after Stage 13

Rank	Rider	Team	Time
1	Bernard Hinault (FRA)	Renault–Elf–Gitane	62h 58' 06"
2	Silvano Contini (ITA)	Bianchi–Piaggio	+ 31"
3	Tommy Prim (SWE)	Bianchi–Piaggio	+ 1' 12"
4	Mario Beccia (ITA)	Hoonved–Bottecchia	+ 2' 21"
5	Francesco Moser (ITA)	Famcucine	+ 2' 29"
6	Giuseppe Saronni (ITA)	Del Tongo	+ 2' 56"
7	Fabrizio Verza (ITA)	Gis Gelati–Olmo	+ 4' 14"
8	Lucien Van Impe (BEL)	Metauro Mobili–Pinarello	+ 4' 23"
9	Alfio Vandi (ITA)	Selle San Marco–Wilier Triestina	+ 4' 49"
10	Gianbattista Baronchelli (ITA)	Bianchi–Piaggio	+ 5' 26"

== Stage 14 ==
29 May 1982 — Pescara to Urbino, 248 km (154 mi)

Stage 14 result

Rank	Rider	Team	Time
1	Guido Bontempi (ITA)	Inoxpran	7h 15' 50"
2	Claudio Torelli (ITA)	Famcucine	s.t.
3	Pierangelo Bincoletto (ITA)	Sammontana–Benotto	s.t.
4	Daniele Caroli (ITA)	Termolan	s.t.
5	Emanuele Bombini (ITA)	Hoonved–Bottecchia	s.t.
6	Guido Van Calster (BEL)	Del Tongo	s.t.
7	Fiorenzo Favero (ITA)	Selle San Marco–Wilier Triestina	s.t.
8	Palmiro Masciarelli (ITA)	Famcucine	s.t.
9	Walter Delle Case (ITA)	Atala	s.t.
10	Roberto Ceruti (ITA)	Del Tongo	+ 5"

General classification after Stage 14

Rank	Rider	Team	Time
1	Bernard Hinault (FRA)	Renault–Elf–Gitane	70h 14' 56"
2	Silvano Contini (ITA)	Bianchi–Piaggio	+ 31"
3	Tommy Prim (SWE)	Bianchi–Piaggio	+ 1' 12"
4	Mario Beccia (ITA)	Hoonved–Bottecchia	+ 2' 21"
5	Francesco Moser (ITA)	Famcucine	+ 2' 29"
6	Giuseppe Saronni (ITA)	Del Tongo	+ 2' 56"
7	Fabrizio Verza (ITA)	Gis Gelati–Olmo	+ 4' 14"
8	Lucien Van Impe (BEL)	Metauro Mobili–Pinarello	+ 4' 23"
9	Alfio Vandi (ITA)	Selle San Marco–Wilier Triestina	+ 4' 49"
10	Gianbattista Baronchelli (ITA)	Bianchi–Piaggio	+ 5' 26"

== Stage 15 ==
30 May 1982 — Urbino to Comacchio, 190 km (120 mi)

Stage 15 result

Rank	Rider	Team	Time
1	Silvestro Milani (ITA)	Hoonved–Bottecchia	5h 14' 58"
2	Urs Freuler (SUI)	Atala	s.t.
3	Daniele Caroli (ITA)	Termolan	s.t.
4	Anders Adamsson (SWE)	Alfa Lum–Sauber	s.t.
5	Francesco Moser (ITA)	Famcucine	s.t.
6	Marc Goossens (BEL)	Bibione–Stern TV	s.t.
7	Sergio Santimaria (ITA)	Selle San Marco–Wilier Triestina	s.t.
8	Dietrich Thurau (FRG)	Bibione–Stern TV	s.t.
9	Giuseppe Saronni (ITA)	Del Tongo	s.t.
10	Guido Van Calster (BEL)	Del Tongo	s.t.

General classification after Stage 15

Rank	Rider	Team	Time
1	Bernard Hinault (FRA)	Renault–Elf–Gitane	75h 29' 54"
2	Silvano Contini (ITA)	Bianchi–Piaggio	+ 31"
3	Tommy Prim (SWE)	Bianchi–Piaggio	+ 1' 12"
4	Mario Beccia (ITA)	Hoonved–Bottecchia	+ 2' 21"
5	Francesco Moser (ITA)	Famcucine	+ 2' 29"
6	Giuseppe Saronni (ITA)	Del Tongo	+ 2' 56"
7	Lucien Van Impe (BEL)	Metauro Mobili–Pinarello	+ 4' 23"
8	Fabrizio Verza (ITA)	Gis Gelati–Olmo	+ 4' 48"
9	Alfio Vandi (ITA)	Selle San Marco–Wilier Triestina	+ 4' 49"
10	Gianbattista Baronchelli (ITA)	Bianchi–Piaggio	+ 5' 26"

== Stage 16 ==
31 May 1982 — Comacchio to San Martino di Castrozza, 243 km (151 mi)

Stage 16 result

Rank	Rider	Team	Time
1	Vicente Belda (ESP)	Kelme–Merckx	7h 19' 46"
2	Mario Beccia (ITA)	Hoonved–Bottecchia	+ 3"
3	Faustino Rupérez (ESP)	Zor–Helios–Gemeaz Cusin	+ 5"
4	Francesco Moser (ITA)	Famcucine	+ 16"
5	Silvano Contini (ITA)	Bianchi–Piaggio	+ 19"
6	Marco Groppo (ITA)	Metauro Mobili–Pinarello	s.t.
7	Bernard Hinault (FRA)	Renault–Elf–Gitane	+ 24"
8	Gianbattista Baronchelli (ITA)	Bianchi–Piaggio	s.t.
9	Lucien Van Impe (BEL)	Metauro Mobili–Pinarello	+ 44"
10	Amilcare Sgalbazzi (ITA)	Inoxpran	+ 2' 19"

General classification after Stage 16

Rank	Rider	Team	Time
1	Bernard Hinault (FRA)	Renault–Elf–Gitane	82h 50' 04"
2	Silvano Contini (ITA)	Bianchi–Piaggio	+ 26"
3	Mario Beccia (ITA)	Hoonved–Bottecchia	+ 1' 40"
4	Francesco Moser (ITA)	Famcucine	+ 2' 16"
5	Tommy Prim (SWE)	Bianchi–Piaggio	+ 3' 09"
6	Lucien Van Impe (BEL)	Metauro Mobili–Pinarello	+ 4' 43"
7	Giuseppe Saronni (ITA)	Del Tongo	+ 5' 15"
8	Gianbattista Baronchelli (ITA)	Bianchi–Piaggio	+ 5' 26"
9	Vicente Belda (ESP)	Kelme–Merckx	+ 6' 40"
10	Fabrizio Verza (ITA)	Gis Gelati–Olmo	+ 6' 58"

== Stage 17 ==
1 June 1982 — Fiera di Primiero to Boario Terme, 235 km (146 mi)

Stage 17 result

Rank	Rider	Team	Time
1	Silvano Contini (ITA)	Bianchi–Piaggio	7h 31' 14"
2	Lucien Van Impe (BEL)	Metauro Mobili–Pinarello	s.t.
3	Tommy Prim (SWE)	Bianchi–Piaggio	+ 3"
4	Gianbattista Baronchelli (ITA)	Bianchi–Piaggio	s.t.
5	Marco Groppo (ITA)	Metauro Mobili–Pinarello	+ 1' 39"
6	Vicente Belda (ESP)	Kelme–Merckx	+ 2' 09"
7	Bernard Hinault (FRA)	Renault–Elf–Gitane	+ 2' 10"
8	Giuseppe Saronni (ITA)	Del Tongo	+ 3' 41"
9	Alfio Vandi (ITA)	Selle San Marco–Wilier Triestina	s.t.
10	Amilcare Sgalbazzi (ITA)	Inoxpran	s.t.

General classification after Stage 17

Rank	Rider	Team	Time
1	Silvano Contini (ITA)	Bianchi–Piaggio	90h 21' 14"
2	Bernard Hinault (FRA)	Renault–Elf–Gitane	+ 2' 14"
3	Tommy Prim (SWE)	Bianchi–Piaggio	+ 3' 06"
4	Lucien Van Impe (BEL)	Metauro Mobili–Pinarello	+ 4' 37"
5	Gianbattista Baronchelli (ITA)	Bianchi–Piaggio	+ 5' 28"
6	Francesco Moser (ITA)	Famcucine	+ 7' 45"
7	Vicente Belda (ESP)	Kelme–Merckx	+ 8' 53"
8	Mario Beccia (ITA)	Hoonved–Bottecchia	+ 8' 54"
9	Giuseppe Saronni (ITA)	Del Tongo	+ 9' 00"
10	Marco Groppo (ITA)	Metauro Mobili–Pinarello	+ 11' 35"

== Stage 18 ==
2 June 1982 — Piancogno to Montecampione, 85 km (53 mi)

Stage 18 result

Rank	Rider	Team	Time
1	Bernard Hinault (FRA)	Renault–Elf–Gitane	2h 26' 01"
2	Lucien Van Impe (BEL)	Metauro Mobili–Pinarello	+ 14"
3	Gianbattista Baronchelli (ITA)	Bianchi–Piaggio	+ 15"
4	Michael Wilson (AUS)	Alfa Lum–Sauber	+ 16"
5	Marco Groppo (ITA)	Metauro Mobili–Pinarello	+ 26"
6	Tommy Prim (SWE)	Bianchi–Piaggio	+ 31"
7	Faustino Rupérez (ESP)	Zor–Helios–Gemeaz Cusin	+ 1' 05"
8	Francesco Moser (ITA)	Famcucine	+ 1' 32"
9	Moreno Argentin (ITA)	Sammontana–Benotto	+ 1' 41"
10	Giuseppe Saronni (ITA)	Del Tongo	+ 1' 44"

General classification after Stage 18

Rank	Rider	Team	Time
1	Bernard Hinault (FRA)	Renault–Elf–Gitane	92h 48' 59"
2	Silvano Contini (ITA)	Bianchi–Piaggio	+ 1' 41"
3	Tommy Prim (SWE)	Bianchi–Piaggio	+ 1' 53"
4	Lucien Van Impe (BEL)	Metauro Mobili–Pinarello	+ 2' 47"
5	Gianbattista Baronchelli (ITA)	Bianchi–Piaggio	+ 3' 49"
6	Francesco Moser (ITA)	Famcucine	+ 7' 53"
7	Giuseppe Saronni (ITA)	Del Tongo	+ 9' 00"
8	Mario Beccia (ITA)	Hoonved–Bottecchia	+ 9' 05"
9	Vicente Belda (ESP)	Kelme–Merckx	+ 9' 49"
10	Marco Groppo (ITA)	Metauro Mobili–Pinarello	+ 10' 17"

== Stage 19 ==
3 June 1982 — Boario Terme to Vigevano, 162 km (101 mi)

Stage 19 result

Rank	Rider	Team	Time
1	Robert Dill-Bundi (SUI)	Hoonved–Bottecchia	4h 16' 58"
2	Guido Van Calster (BEL)	Del Tongo	s.t.
3	Francesco Moser (ITA)	Famcucine	s.t.
4	Silvestro Milani (ITA)	Hoonved–Bottecchia	s.t.
5	Daniele Caroli (ITA)	Termolan	s.t.
6	Noël Dejonckheere (BEL)	Gis Gelati–Olmo	s.t.
7	Emanuele Bombini (ITA)	Hoonved–Bottecchia	s.t.
8	Ennio Salvador (ITA)	Gis Gelati–Olmo	s.t.
9	Urs Freuler (SUI)	Atala	s.t.
10	Paolo Rosola (ITA)	Atala	s.t.

General classification after Stage 19

Rank	Rider	Team	Time
1	Bernard Hinault (FRA)	Renault–Elf–Gitane	97h 05' 57"
2	Silvano Contini (ITA)	Bianchi–Piaggio	+ 1' 41"
3	Tommy Prim (SWE)	Bianchi–Piaggio	+ 1' 53"
4	Lucien Van Impe (BEL)	Metauro Mobili–Pinarello	+ 2' 47"
5	Gianbattista Baronchelli (ITA)	Bianchi–Piaggio	+ 3' 49"
6	Francesco Moser (ITA)	Famcucine	+ 7' 43"
7	Giuseppe Saronni (ITA)	Del Tongo	+ 9' 00"
8	Mario Beccia (ITA)	Hoonved–Bottecchia	+ 9' 05"
9	Vicente Belda (ESP)	Kelme–Merckx	+ 9' 49"
10	Marco Groppo (ITA)	Metauro Mobili–Pinarello	+ 10' 17"

== Stage 20 ==
4 June 1982 — Vigevano to Cuneo, 177 km (110 mi)

Stage 20 result

Rank	Rider	Team	Time
1	Francesco Moser (ITA)	Famcucine	4h 35' 06"
2	Paolo Rosola (ITA)	Atala	s.t.
3	Giuseppe Saronni (ITA)	Del Tongo	s.t.
4	Noël Dejonckheere (BEL)	Gis Gelati–Olmo	s.t.
5	Fiorenzo Favero (ITA)	Selle San Marco–Wilier Triestina	s.t.
6	Pierino Gavazzi (ITA)	Atala	s.t.
7	Marc Goossens (BEL)	Bibione–Stern TV	s.t.
8	Daniele Caroli (ITA)	Termolan	s.t.
9	Anders Adamsson (SWE)	Alfa Lum–Sauber	s.t.
10	Laurent Fignon (FRA)	Renault–Elf–Gitane	s.t.

General classification after Stage 20

Rank	Rider	Team	Time
1	Bernard Hinault (FRA)	Renault–Elf–Gitane	101h 41' 12"
2	Silvano Contini (ITA)	Bianchi–Piaggio	+ 1' 41"
3	Tommy Prim (SWE)	Bianchi–Piaggio	+ 1' 53"
4	Lucien Van Impe (BEL)	Metauro Mobili–Pinarello	+ 2' 47"
5	Gianbattista Baronchelli (ITA)	Bianchi–Piaggio	+ 4' 07"
6	Francesco Moser (ITA)	Famcucine	+ 7' 04"
7	Giuseppe Saronni (ITA)	Del Tongo	+ 8' 41"
8	Mario Beccia (ITA)	Hoonved–Bottecchia	+ 9' 23"
9	Vicente Belda (ESP)	Kelme–Merckx	+ 10' 09"
10	Marco Groppo (ITA)	Metauro Mobili–Pinarello	+ 10' 35"

== Stage 21 ==
5 June 1982 — Cuneo to Pinerolo, 254 km (158 mi)

Stage 21 result

Rank	Rider	Team	Time
1	Giuseppe Saronni (ITA)	Del Tongo	7h 35' 49"
2	Bernard Hinault (FRA)	Renault–Elf–Gitane	s.t.
3	Tommy Prim (SWE)	Bianchi–Piaggio	s.t.
4	Silvano Contini (ITA)	Bianchi–Piaggio	s.t.
5	Leonardo Natale (ITA)	Del Tongo	s.t.
6	Faustino Rupérez (ESP)	Zor–Helios–Gemeaz Cusin	s.t.
7	Gianbattista Baronchelli (ITA)	Bianchi–Piaggio	s.t.
8	Marco Groppo (ITA)	Metauro Mobili–Pinarello	s.t.
9	Mario Beccia (ITA)	Hoonved–Bottecchia	s.t.
10	Lucien Van Impe (BEL)	Metauro Mobili–Pinarello	s.t.

General classification after Stage 21

Rank	Rider	Team	Time
1	Bernard Hinault (FRA)	Renault–Elf–Gitane	109h 16' 41"
2	Silvano Contini (ITA)	Bianchi–Piaggio	+ 1' 56"
3	Tommy Prim (SWE)	Bianchi–Piaggio	+ 2' 03"
4	Lucien Van Impe (BEL)	Metauro Mobili–Pinarello	+ 3' 07"
5	Gianbattista Baronchelli (ITA)	Bianchi–Piaggio	+ 4' 22"
6	Giuseppe Saronni (ITA)	Del Tongo	+ 8' 31"
7	Mario Beccia (ITA)	Hoonved–Bottecchia	+ 9' 43"
8	Marco Groppo (ITA)	Metauro Mobili–Pinarello	+ 10' 55"
9	Francesco Moser (ITA)	Famcucine	+ 11' 47"
10	Faustino Rupérez (ESP)	Zor–Helios–Gemeaz Cusin	+ 12' 25"

== Stage 22 ==
6 June 1982 — Pinerolo to Turin, 42.5 km (26.4 mi) (ITT)

Stage 22 result

Rank	Rider	Team	Time
1	Bernard Hinault (FRA)	Renault–Elf–Gitane	51' 14"
2	Francesco Moser (ITA)	Famcucine	+ 10"
3	Urs Freuler (SUI)	Atala	+ 14"
4	Tommy Prim (SWE)	Bianchi–Piaggio	+ 32"
5	Czesław Lang (POL)	Gis Gelati–Olmo	+ 33"
6	Silvano Contini (ITA)	Bianchi–Piaggio	+ 51"
7	Claudio Torelli (ITA)	Famcucine	+ 1' 07"
8	Mario Beccia (ITA)	Hoonved–Bottecchia	+ 1' 23"
9	Lucien Van Impe (BEL)	Metauro Mobili–Pinarello	+ 1' 24"
10	Daniele Caroli (ITA)	Termolan	+ 1' 27"

General classification after Stage 22

Rank	Rider	Team	Time
1	Bernard Hinault (FRA)	Renault–Elf–Gitane	110h 07' 55"
2	Tommy Prim (SWE)	Bianchi–Piaggio	+ 2' 35"
3	Silvano Contini (ITA)	Bianchi–Piaggio	+ 2' 47"
4	Lucien Van Impe (BEL)	Metauro Mobili–Pinarello	+ 4' 31"
5	Gianbattista Baronchelli (ITA)	Bianchi–Piaggio	+ 6' 09"
6	Giuseppe Saronni (ITA)	Del Tongo	+ 10' 52"
7	Mario Beccia (ITA)	Hoonved–Bottecchia	+ 11' 06"
8	Francesco Moser (ITA)	Famcucine	+ 11' 57"
9	Marco Groppo (ITA)	Metauro Mobili–Pinarello	+ 14' 43"
10	Faustino Rupérez (ESP)	Zor–Helios–Gemeaz Cusin	+ 14' 57"
