= Giro di Puglia =

Cycling race in Italy

Race details
- Date: October
- Region: Apulia, Italy
- English name: Tour of Apulia
- Local name: Giro di Puglia (in Italian)
- Discipline: Road race
- Type: Stage race
- Organiser: RCS Sport

History
- First edition: 1972
- Editions: 25
- Final edition: 2008
- First winner: Franco Bitossi (ITA)
- Most wins: Giuseppe Saronni (ITA) (3 wins)
- Final winner: Glenn Magnusson (SWE)

The Giro di Puglia (English: Tour of Apulia) was a road bicycle racing stage race. It consisted of three or four stages. It was first held in 1972, but last took place in 1998.

Year	Winner	Second	Third
1972	(Italy) Franco Bitossi	(Sweden) Gösta Pettersson	(Sweden) Tomas Pettersson
1973	(Italy) Felice Gimondi	(Italy) Franco Bitossi	(Italy) Michele Dancelli
1974	(Italy) Fabrizio Fabbri	(Denmark) Ole Ritter	(Italy) Sigfrido Fontanelli
1975	(Italy) Giovanni Battaglin	(Italy) Franco Bitossi	(Italy) Constantino Conti
1976	(Italy) Francesco Moser	(Spain) Miguel María Lasa	(Italy) Gianbattista Baronchelli
1977	(Italy) Pierino Gavazzi	(Italy) Marino Basso	(Italy) Giuseppe Saronni
1978	(Italy) Giuseppe Saronni	(Italy) Francesco Moser	(Italy) Wladimiro Panizza
1979	(Belgium) Roger De Vlaeminck	(Italy) Vittorio Algeri	(Italy) Silvano Contini
1980	(Italy) Giuseppe Saronni	(Italy) Gianbattista Baronchelli	(Norway) Knut Knudsen
1981	(Italy) Gianbattista Baronchelli	(Italy) Claudio Torelli	(Italy) Giovanni Mantovani
1982	(Sweden) Alf Segersäll	(Italy) Vittorio Algeri	(Italy) Gianbattista Baronchelli
1983	(Italy) Mario Noris	(Italy) Gianbattista Baronchelli	(Socialist Federal Republic of Yugoslavia) Vinko Polončič
1984	(Italy) Giovanni Mantovani	(Italy) Claudio Torelli	(Italy) Gianbattista Baronchelli
1985	(Italy) Silvano Contini	(Italy) Fabrizio Verza	(Italy) Luciano Rabottini
1986	(Italy) Roberto Pagnin	(Italy) Giuseppe Saronni	(Denmark) Dag Erik Pedersen
1987	(Italy) Guido Bontempi	(Italy) Roberto Visentini	(Italy) Ezio Moroni
1988	(Italy) Giuseppe Saronni	(Italy) Franco Chioccioli	(Switzerland) Stephan Joho
1989	(Italy) Angelo Lecchi	(Italy) Emanuele Bombini	(Italy) Fabrizio Convalle
1990	(Italy) Guido Bontempi	(Italy) Stefano Colagè	(Italy) Marco Vitale
1991	(Italy) Fabiano Fontanelli	(Italy) Enrico Zaina	(Italy) Marco Lietti
1992	(France) Dominique Arnould	(France) Gerard Rue	(France) Christophe Manin
1993	(Italy) Giuseppe Calcaterra	(Italy) Luca Gelfi	(Italy) Massimo Ghirotto
1994-95	not organized		
1996	(Italy) Fabrizio Guidi	(Italy) Francesco Casagrande	(Italy) Stefano Colagè
1997	(Italy) Silvio Martinello	(Italy) Sergio Barbero	(Sweden) Glenn Magnusson
1998	(Sweden) Glenn Magnusson	(Italy) Massimo Donati	(Estonia) Jaan Kirsipuu
