= Schuiten =

Schuiten is a surname. Notable people with the surname include:

- François Schuiten (born 1956), Belgian comics artist
- Roy Schuiten (1950–2006), Dutch cyclist
