= Chinetti =

Chinetti is a surname. Notable people with the surname include:

- Alfredo Chinetti (born 1949), Italian cyclist
- Luigi Chinetti (1901–1994), Italian-born racing driver
