= Álvaro Crespi =

Italian cyclist and directeur sportif

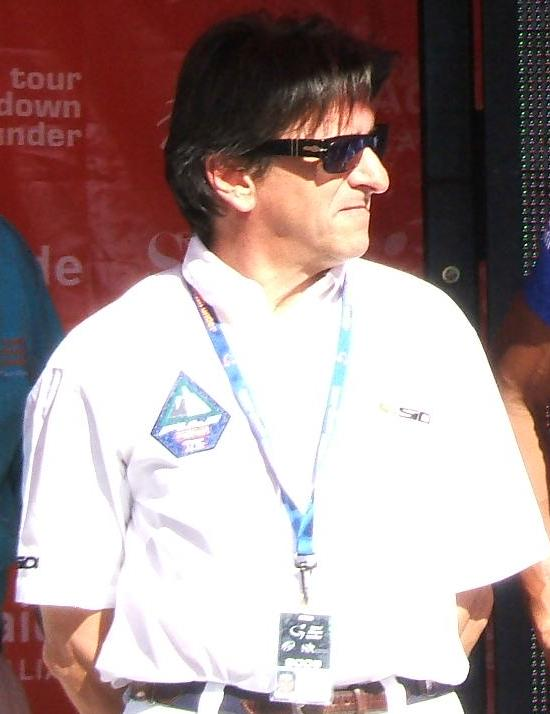

Personal information
- Full name: Álvaro Crespi
- Born: 20 March 1955 (age 71) Legnano, Italy

Cycling career
- Sport: Cycling
- Discipline: Road
- Role: Rider

Professional team
- 1978–1980: Mecap

Àlvaro Crespi (born 20 March 1955 in Legnano) is a directeur sportif with the Saunier Duval–Prodir cycling team. He was a professional from 1978 to 1980.
