= Vittorio Algeri =

Italian cyclist and directeur sportif (born 1953)

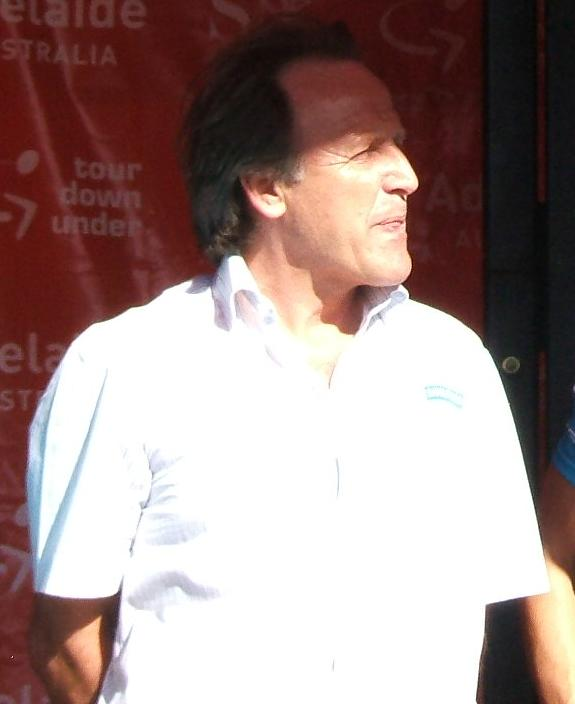

Personal information
- Full name: Vittorio Algeri
- Born: 3 January 1953 (age 73) Torre de' Roveri, Italy

Cycling career
- Sport: Cycling
- Discipline: Road
- Role: Rider

Professional teams
- 1977: G.B.C.-Itla
- 1978: Intercontinentale
- 1979: Sapa
- 1980: Magniflex
- 1981: Hoonved-Bottecchia
- 1982–1984: Metauro Mobili-Pinarello
- 1985–1986: Vini Ricordi-Pinarello-Sidermec
- 1987: Supermercati Brianzoli–Chateau d'Ax

Managerial teams
- 1988–1993: Chateau d'Ax
- 1994–2000: Team Polti–Vaporetto
- 2001–2003: Tacconi Sport–Vini Caldirola
- 2006–2009: Team Milram

Vittorio Algeri (born 3 January 1953) is a directeur sportif in cycling, most recently for Team Milram. A former cyclist, he finished in 8th place in the men's road race for Italy at the 1976 Summer Olympics. He was born in Torre de' Roveri, Bergamo, Italy.
