= Thierry Bolle =

Swiss cyclist

Personal information
- Born: 21 May 1953 (age 73) Pontarlier, France
- Died: 2020.06.24

Cycling career
- Sport: Cycling
- Role: Rider

Thierry Bolle (born 21 May 1953) is a Swiss former professional racing cyclist. He rode in four editions of the Tour de France.
