= Luciano Rui =

Italian cyclist

Personal information
- Born: 12 December 1958 (age 67) Vittorio Veneto, Italy

Cycling career
- Sport: Cycling
- Role: Rider

Luciano Rui (born 12 December 1958) is an Italian former professional racing cyclist. He rode in the 1982 Tour de France.
