= Nazzareno Berto =

Italian cyclist

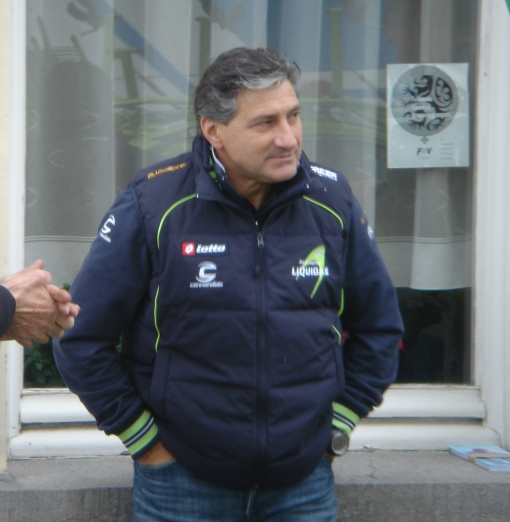

Personal information
- Born: 20 February 1957 (age 69) Conselve, Italy

Cycling career
- Sport: Cycling
- Discipline: Road
- Role: Rider
- Rider type: Sprinter

Amateur teams
- 1976: Vicenza–Campagnolo
- 1978: Mantovani–Rovigo

Professional teams
- 1979–1981: Inoxpran
- 1982: Metauro Mobili–Pinarello
- 1983: Mareno–Wilier Triestina
- 1984: Fanini–Wührer

Nazzareno Berto (born 20 February 1957) is an Italian former racing cyclist. He rode in the 1979 Tour de France and in four editions of the Giro d'Italia.

== Major results ==
1976
1st Trofeo Piva
1st Stage 4 Girobio
1978
1st Trofeo Città di San Vendemiano
1980
1st Giro di Toscana
1981
3rd Milano–Torino
1984
10th Milano–Torino
