= Marco Groppo =

Italian cyclist

Personal information
- Full name: Marco Groppo
- Born: 4 September 1960 (age 66) Gorla Minore, Italy

Cycling career
- Sport: Cycling
- Discipline: Road
- Role: Rider

Professional teams
- 1981: Hoonved-Bottecchia
- 1982–1983: Metauro Mobili
- 1984: Dromedario
- 1989: Eurocar

Major wins
- Grand Tours Giro d'Italia Young rider Classification (1982)

Marco Groppo (born 4 September 1960) is a former Italian professional cyclist. He is most known for winning the Young rider Classification in the 1982 Giro d'Italia. His highest finish in the Giro d'Italia was the year he won the Young rider classification; he placed ninth that year. He retired from cycling in 1989.
