= Antonio Bevilacqua (cyclist, born 1957) =

Italian cyclist

Personal information
- Born: 18 April 1957 (age 69)

Cycling career
- Sport: Cycling
- Role: Rider

Antonio Bevilacqua (born 18 April 1957) is an Italian racing cyclist. He rode in the 1982 Tour de France.
