= Bernard Becaas =

French cyclist (1955–2000)

Personal information
- Full name: Bernard Becaas
- Born: 23 May 1955 Oloron-Sainte-Marie, France
- Died: 25 August 2000 (aged 45) Lasseube, France
- Height: 1.67 m (5 ft 6 in)

Cycling career
- Sport: Cycling
- Discipline: Road
- Role: Rider

Professional team
- 1978–1983: Renault–Elf

Major wins
- 1 stage 1982 Giro d'Italia

Bernard Becaas (23 May 1955 – 25 August 2000) was a French cyclist.

== Biography ==
Born in Oloron-Sainte-Marie, Becaas began cycling in the cadet category of FC Oloron Cycling. He won an Aquitaine champion title in 1972. As an amateur, he won the Paris-Rouen in 1976 and the Nice Grand Prix in 1977 as well as two stages of the Tour de l'Avenir.

His biggest win was in the 11th stage of the 1982 Giro d'Italia.

He died in 2000, following a motorcycle accident.
