= Marc Goossens (cyclist) =

Belgian cyclist (born 1958)

Personal information
- Born: 11 February 1958 (age 68)

Cycling career
- Sport: Cycling
- Role: Rider

Marc Goossens (born 11 February 1958) is a Belgian racing cyclist. He rode in the 1981 Tour de France.
