= Silvestro Milani =

Italian cyclist

Personal information
- Born: 25 February 1958 (age 68) Treviolo, Italy

Cycling career
- Sport: Cycling
- Role: Rider

Silvestro Milani (born 25 February 1958) is an Italian former professional racing cyclist. He rode in one edition of the Tour de France and four editions of the Giro d'Italia. He also competed in the team pursuit event at the 1980 Summer Olympics.
