= Valerio Lualdi =

Italian cyclist

Personal information
- Born: 31 August 1951 (age 75) Busto Arsizio, Italy

Cycling career
- Sport: Cycling
- Role: Rider

Valerio Lualdi (born 31 August 1951) is an Italian former professional racing cyclist. He rode in four editions of the Tour de France and four editions of the Giro d'Italia.
