= Mario Noris =

Italian racing cyclist

Personal information
- Born: 2 December 1958 (age 67) Bondo Petello, Albino, Lombardy, Italy

Cycling career
- Sport: Cycling
- Current team: Retired
- Disciplines: Road; Mountain biking
- Role: Rider

Professional teams
- 1978: Intercontinentale Assicurazioni
- 1979: Sapa Assicurazioni
- 1980–1981: Magniflex–Olmo
- 1982–1988: Atala
Medal record
Representing Italy
Mountain bike racing
European Championships
| Silver medal – second place | 1991 La Bourboule | Cross-country |

Mario Noris (born 2 December 1958) is an Italian former racing cyclist, who competed as a professional from 1978 to 1988. He most notably won the Giro di Toscana in 1979 and the Giro di Puglia in 1983. After retiring from road racing, he competed in mountain biking and won the silver medal in the cross-country race at the 1990 European Mountain Bike Championships.

== Major results ==
=== Road ===
1977
1st Circuito del Porto
1979
1st Giro di Toscana
1980
6th Giro di Toscana
10th Gran Premio Città di Camaiore
10th Coppa Ugo Agostoni
1981
8th Milano–Vignola
1982
2nd Trofeo Laigueglia
6th Tre Valli Varesine
9th Trofeo Pantalica
1983
1st Overall Giro di Puglia

1st Stage 3

2nd Giro dell'Etna
3rd Giro di Campania
7th Trofeo Pantalica
9th Overall Giro di Sardegna
1987
6th Grand Prix Cerami
10th Overall Settimana Internazionale di Coppi e Bartali
1988
6th Grand Prix Cerami

==== Grand Tour general classification results timeline ====
| Grand Tour | 1979 | 1980 | 1981 | 1982 | 1983 | 1984 | 1985 | 1986 | 1987 | 1988 |
|---|---|---|---|---|---|---|---|---|---|---|
| Vuelta a España | — | — | — | — | — | — | — | — | — | — |
| Giro d'Italia | 98 | 68 | 85 | 93 | 102 | 96 | 95 | 87 | 75 | 96 |
| Tour de France | — | — | — | — | — | — | — | — | — | — |

=== MTB ===
1990
7th UCI World XCO Championships
1991
2nd European XCO Championships
