= Leonardo Mazzantini =

Italian cyclist (born 1953)

Personal information
- Born: 6 September 1953 (age 73) Empoli, Italy

Cycling career
- Sport: Cycling
- Current team: Retired
- Discipline: Road
- Role: Rider

Amateur teams
- 1972: Sammontana
- 1973–1975: Capp Branzi
- 1976: Chima Castello

Professional teams
- 1977–1979: Zonca–Santini
- 1980: Sanson–Campagnolo
- 1981–1982: Famcucine–Campagnolo
- 1983: Gis Gelati

Leonardo Mazzantini (born 6 September 1953) is an Italian former racing cyclist, who competed as a professional from 1977 to 1983.

== Major results ==
1974
3rd Piccolo Giro di Lombardia
1977
4th Trofeo Pantalica
5th Gran Premio Città di Camaiore
8th Giro della Provincia di reggio Calabria
1978
3rd Giro della Provincia di reggio Calabria
1979
1st Coppa Sabatini
1st GP Montelupo
3rd Overall Tour de Suisse
5th Gran Premio Città di Camaiore
7th Giro del Lazio
8th Coppa Placci
9th Coppa Agostoni
10th Tre Valli Varesine
1980
2nd GP Industria & Commercio di Prato
2nd Overall (TTT) Cronostaffetta
4th Tre Valli Varesine
1981
1st Giro di Campania
6th Coppa Placci
8th Giro del Veneto
1983
9th Giro del Veneto

=== Grand Tour general classification results timeline ===
Grand Tour	1977	1978	1979	1980	1981	1982
Vuelta a España	—	—	—	—	—	—
Giro d'Italia	77	28	81	43	47	24
Tour de France	—	—	—	—	—	—
