= Benedetto Patellaro =

Italian cyclist

Personal information
- Born: 9 January 1960 (age 66) Monreale, Italy

Cycling career
- Sport: Cycling
- Role: Rider

Benedetto Patellaro (born 9 January 1960) is an Italian former professional racing cyclist. He rode in one edition of the Tour de France and five editions of the Giro d'Italia.
