= Aldo Donadello =

Italian cyclist

Personal information
- Born: 19 April 1953 (age 73)

Cycling career
- Sport: Cycling
- Role: Rider

Aldo Donadello (born 19 April 1953) is an Italian racing cyclist. He rode in the 1979 Tour de France.
