= Selle San Marco =

Cycling team (1981-1982)

Team information
- Registered: Italy
- Founded: 1981
- Disbanded: 1982
- Discipline: Road

Key personnel
- Team manager: Carlo Menicagli

Team name history
- 1981 1982: Selle San Marco–Sider–Gabrielli; Selle San Marco–Wilier Triestina

Selle San Marco was an Italian professional cycling team that existed from 1981 to 1982. It was the predecessor to the Dromedario cycling team.

The team competed in the 1981 and 1982 Giro d'Italia.

== Major wins ==
1981
Giro della Provincia di Reggio Calabria, Alfio Vandi
Coppa Placci, Alfio Vandi
