= Dante Morandi =

Italian cyclist

Personal information
- Born: 24 February 1958 (age 68)

Cycling career
- Sport: Cycling
- Role: Rider

Dante Morandi (born 24 February 1958) is an Italian racing cyclist. He won stage 4 of the 1980 Giro d'Italia.
