= Claudio Torelli =

Italian cyclist

Personal information
- Born: 23 January 1954 (age 72) Parma, Italy

Cycling career
- Sport: Cycling
- Current team: Retired
- Discipline: Road
- Role: Rider

Professional teams
- 1978–1979: Zonca-Santini
- 1980: Bianchi–Piaggio
- 1981–1982: Famcucine
- 1983–1985: Sammontana–Campagnolo
- 1986: Ariostea

Claudio Torelli (born 23 January 1954 in Parma) is an Italian former cyclist.

== Major results ==
1974
1st Stage 5 Girobio
1976
2nd Trofeo Papà Cervi
1977
1st Trofeo Papà Cervi
1979
2nd Grand Prix of Aargau Canton
1981
1st Stage 3 Giro del Trentino
1st Stage 16 Giro d'Italia
2nd Overall Giro di Puglia

1st Stage 3

4th Milan–San Remo
1982
2nd Tre Valli Varesine
2nd National Road Race Championships
3rd GP Montelupo
1983
1st Trofeo Laigueglia
2nd Trofeo Matteotti
1984
2nd Overall Giro di Puglia
3rd Trofeo Laigueglia
8th Züri-Metzgete
