= Giovanni Renosto =

Italian cyclist

Personal information
- Born: 14 September 1960 (age 66) Treviso, Italy

Sport
- Sport: Cycling
Medal record
Representing Italy
UCI Motor-paced World Championships
Bronze medal – third place	1986 Colorado Springs	professionals
Gold medal – first place	1989 Lyon	professionals

Giovanni Renosto (born 14 September 1960) is a retired professional cyclist from Italy. He won every national championship in motor-paced racing between 1986 and 1989. He also won the UCI Motor-paced World Championships in 1989 and finished in third place in 1986.
