= Fiorenzo Favero =

Italian cyclist (born 1955)

Personal information
- Full name: Fiorenzo Favero
- Born: 23 October 1955 (age 70) Padova, Italy

Cycling career
- Sport: Cycling
- Current team: Retired
- Discipline: Road
- Role: Rider

Professional teams
- 1978: Intercontinentale
- 1979: Sapa
- 1980: Hoonved
- 1981: Santini
- 1982: Selle San Marco
- 1983–1985: Sammontana

'Fiorenzo Favero (born 23 October 1955) is a retired Italian cyclist, who rode professionally from 1978 to 1985. He participated in the Giro d'Italia 7 times, and won the minor Campionato delle Regioni classification in the 1980 Giro d'Italia.

In 1977, as an amateur, he won the Trofeo Gianfranco Bianchin.
