= Vini Ricordi–Pinarello–Sidermec =

Italian Cycling Team

Team information
- Registered: Italy
- Founded: 1982
- Discipline: Road
- Bicycles: Pinarello

Team name history
- 1982–1984 1985–1986: Metauro Mobili–Pinarello; Vini Ricordi–Pinarello–Sidermec

Vini Ricordi–Pinarello–Sidermec was an Italian professional cycling team that existed from 1982 to 1986. It participated in the 1983 Tour de France; it won the mountains classification with Lucien Van Impe and won three stages.
