= Giovanni Mantovani =

Italian cyclist

Personal information
- Full name: Giovanni Mantovani
- Born: 5 February 1955 (age 71) Gudo Visconti, Italy

Cycling career
- Sport: Cycling
- Disciplines: Road and track
- Role: Rider

Professional teams
- 1977: Brooklyn
- 1978–1979: Selle Royal-Inoxpran
- 1980–1981: Hoonved–Bottecchia
- 1982: Famcucine
- 1983: Gis Gelati
- 1984: Malvor–Bottecchia
- 1985: Supermercati Brianzoli
- 1986: Vini Ricordi–Pinarello–Sidermec
- 1987: Selca–Conti-Galli
- 1988: Atala–Ofmega

Major wins
- Giro del Veneto (1981); Milano–Vignola (1982); Giro di Puglia (1984); Tre Valli Varesine (1985)
Medal record
Representing Italy
Men's track cycling
World Championships
Silver medal – second place	1980 Besançon	Points race

Giovanni Mantovani (born 5 February 1955) is a former Italian racing cyclist.

== Major results ==
1977
1st Stage 3 Giro di Puglia
4th Tre Valli Varesine
8th Milano–Torino
1979
1st Stage 1 Tour of the Basque Country
4th G.P. Camaiore
6th Tre Valli Varesine
9th Milan–San Remo
1980
Giro d'Italia

1st Stages 9 & 10

1981
1st Giro del Veneto
2nd Coppa Bernocchi
2nd Giro di Campania
2nd G.P. Camaiore
3rd Overall Giro del Trentino

1st Stages 1 & 3a

3rd Overall Giro di Puglia
1982
1st Milano-Vignola
3rd Giro dell'Umbria
3rd GP Alghero
5th Milano–Torino
7th Overall Route du Sud

1st Stages 2b & 3

1983
1st Stage 2 Giro di Puglia
1st Giro dell'Etna
2nd GP Alghero
3rd Trofeo Pantalica
5th Milano–Torino
1984
1st Overall Giro di Puglia

1st Stages 1 & 2

2nd Giro del Lazio
2nd Giro di Romagna
8th Giro dell'Emilia
1985
1st Stage 4 Giro di Puglia
1st Tre Valli Varesine
2nd Giro di Toscana
3rd Coppa Bernocchi
5th Milan–San Remo
1986
1st Stage 1 Giro di Puglia
1st Nice–Alassio
8th Trofeo Laigueglia
1988
3rd Rund um den Henninger Turm
4th Trofeo Laigueglia
