= Roy Schuiten =

Dutch cyclist (1950–2006)

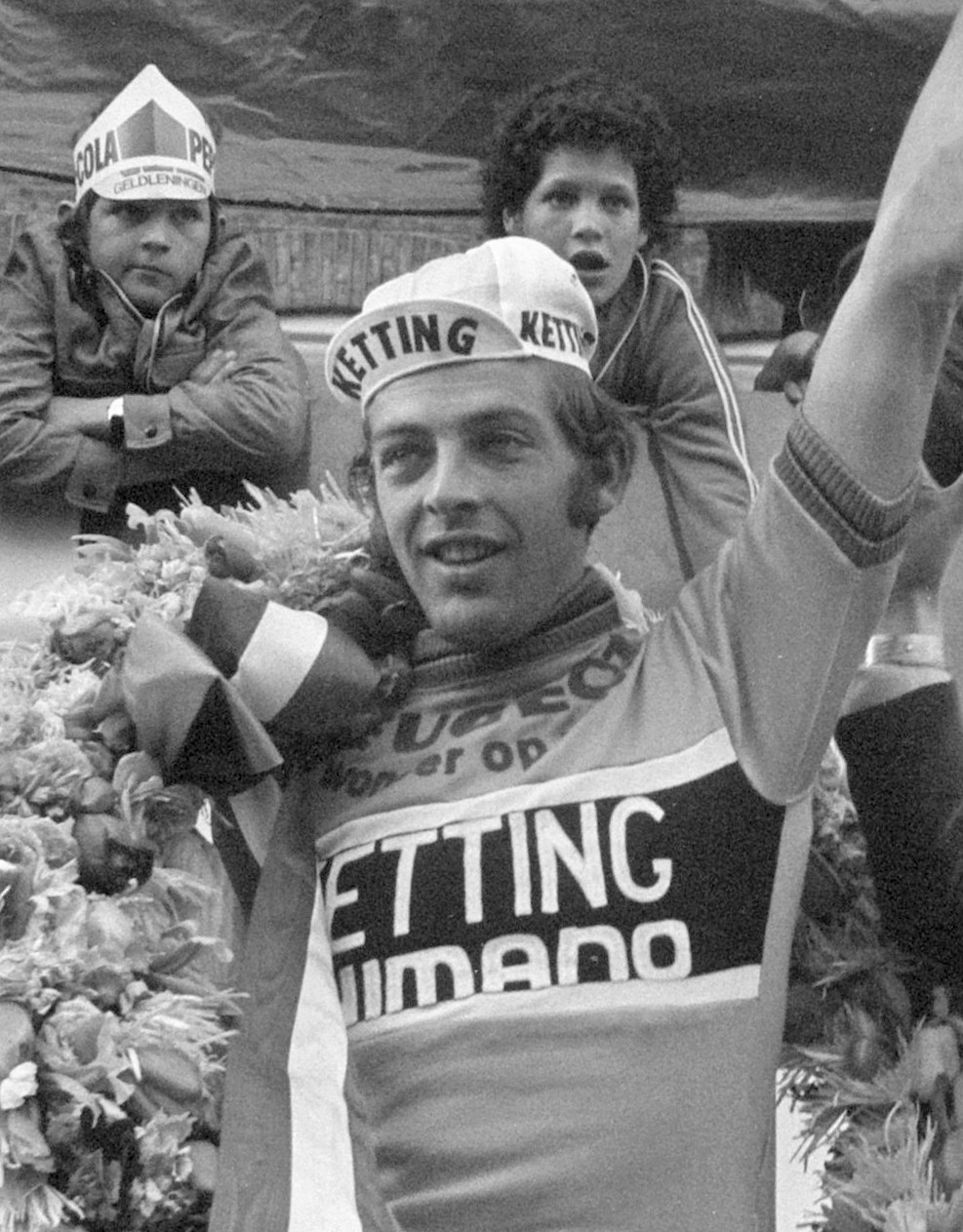
- Schuiten in 1974

Personal information
- Full name: Roy Schuiten
- Born: 16 December 1950 Zandvoort, Netherlands
- Died: 19 September 2006 (aged 55) Praia do Carvoeiro, Portugal
- Height: 1.84 m (6 ft 0 in)
- Weight: 83 kg (183 lb)

Cycling career
- Sport: Cycling
- Disciplines: Road and track
- Rider type: Time-trialist, pursuit

Professional teams
- 1974–1975: TI–Raleigh
- 1976–1977: Lejeune–BP
- 1978–1979: Scic–Bottecchia
- 1980: Inoxpran
- 1981: Kotter–GBC
- 1982: Kelme–Merckx

Managerial team
- 1986: PDM–Concorde

Major wins
- World Individual Pursuit Champion (1974, 1975); Grand Prix des Nations (1974, 1975); Rund um den Henninger Turm (1975)

Roy Schuiten (16 December 1950 – 19 September 2006) was a Dutch track and road racing cyclist. After retirement he became a team manager before starting a restaurant.

== Background ==
Schuiten was a tall (1.85 m (6 ft 1 in)), stylish rider who shone as an amateur. He was the 1972 national pursuit champion, broke the amateur record for 4,000 m on an indoor track, and won numerous team time-trials. He finished in fifth place in the individual pursuit and team pursuit events at the 1972 Summer Olympics. He came close to not turning professional because his father died in a traffic accident in 1973. He stopped cycling for a season to help his mother run the family wine and spirits business in Zandvoort. The following year Schuiten's younger brother, Fred, took over the business and on 17 July 1974 Schuiten turned professional for the TI–Raleighteam run by Peter Post.

== Track career ==
Schuiten established himself with Raleigh by winning the world pursuit championship in September 1974, beating Ferdinand Bracke of Belgium in the final. Bracke had been leading until an official indicated there were four laps still to ride when there were six. Bracke faded and Schuiten won.

Schuiten won again in 1975 by beating Knut Knudsen of Norway. He won silver medals in 1976 and 1978. He was national champion six times.

In 1975 Post encouraged Schuiten to attempt Eddy Merckx's world hour record in Mexico. The frame-builder Jan Legrand made him a bicycle weighing only 5.7 kg. but Schuiten failed at his three attempts, unable to cope with the rarified air of Mexico City. Press criticism in the Netherlands was marked and Schuiten, demoralised, never again rode on the track at the same level.

Main track achievements

- World championship : Team pursuit (amateurs), 3rd (1973)
- World championship : Individual pursuit, 1st (1974, 1975), 2nd (1976, 1978)
- European championship : Team pursuit, 3rd (1974)
- Sixdays of Berlin (GER), 1st (1974) (paired with René Pijnen)
- National championship : Individual pursuit (amateurs), 1st (1972, 1973)
- National championship : Individual pursuit, 1st (1974, 1975,1976, 1977, 1978, 1980), 2nd (1981)
- National championship : 50 km, 1st (1975)
- National championship : Motor-paced, 1st (1978)
- National championship : track, Scratch, 1st (1975)
- National championship : track, Omnium (amateurs) (1975)
- National championship : track, Omnium, (1975)

== Road ==
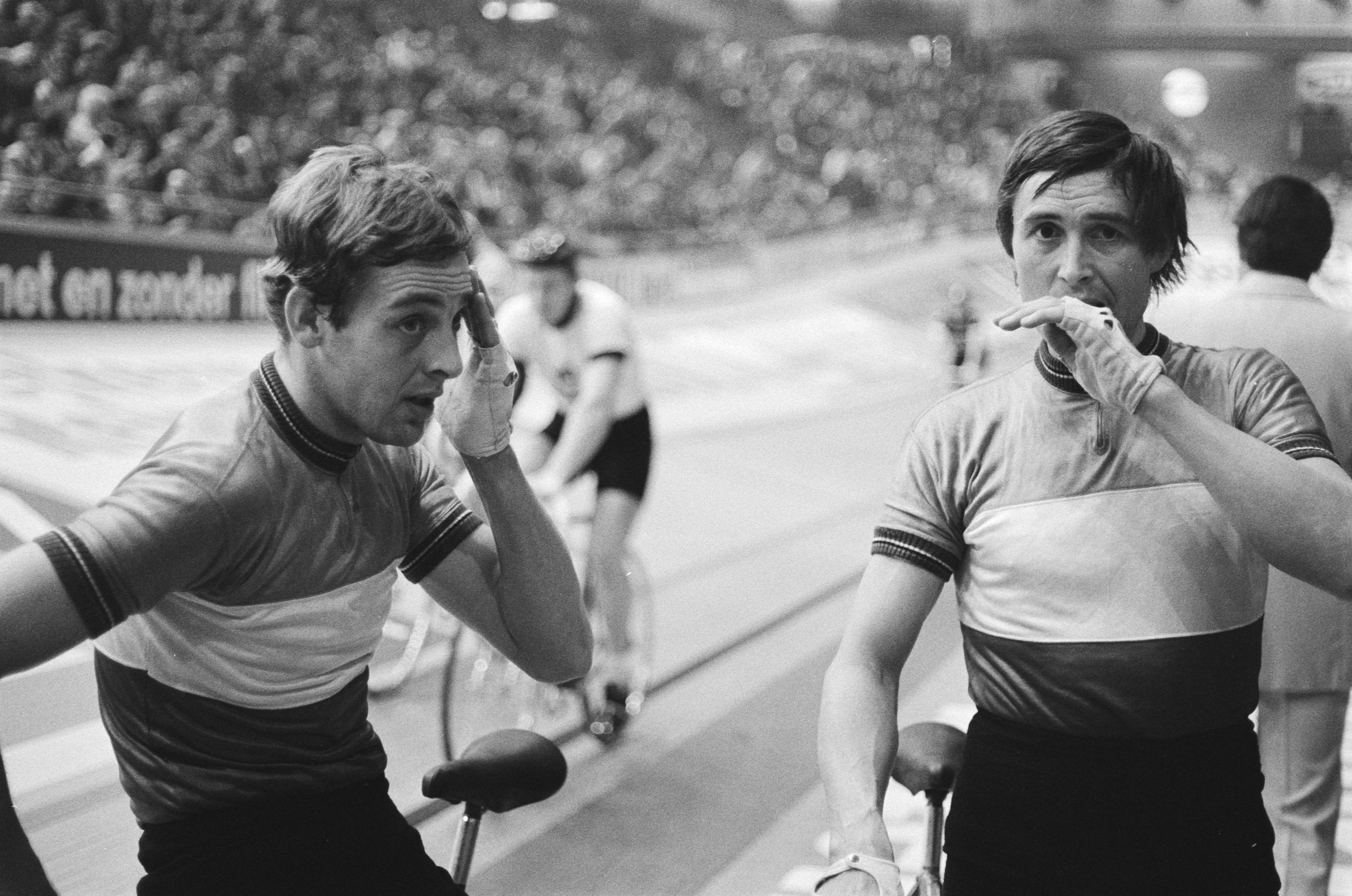
Roy Schuiten (left) and Gerben Karstens in Rotterdam in 1978

Schuiten rode the Tour de France twice (finishing 2nd and 3rd in time trials) the Giro d'Italia five times. In 1975 he won the Rund um den Henninger-Turm. He won the Grand Prix des Nations in 1974 and 1975. He won the Trofeo Baracchi (1974 with Francesco Moser and in 1978 with Knut Knudsen), the GP Kanton Aargau Gippingen (1976) and the GP Forli (1979).

He changed teams frequently after leaving Raleigh in 1976, doing well in races up to a week long but best of all when riding against the clock.

Main road achievements

- 1968: 1e in de ronde van Hasselt, Zevenaar, Harderwijk en Delden en clubkampioen
- 1971: 1e in NK op de weg, Militair
- 1974: 1e in 9e etappe Milk Race, Whitley Bay (GBR)
- 1974: 1e in 10e etappe Milk Race, Carlisle (GBR)
- 1974: 1e in Eindklassement Milk Race (GBR)
- 1974: 1e in Proloog Milk Race, Brighton (GBR)
- 1974: 1e in Eindklassement Olympia's Tour (NED)
- 1974: 1e in 7e etappe deel b Olympia's Tour, Oss (NED)
- 1974: 1e in 2e etappe deel a Étoile des Espoirs, St Martin de Landelles (FRA)
- 1974: 1e in 2e etappe deel b Étoile des Espoirs, Fougères (FRA)
- 1974: 1e in Eindklassement Étoile des Espoirs (FRA)
- 1974: 1e in GP des Nations (FRA)
- 1974: 1e in Trofeo Baracchi (ITA)
- 1975: 1e in Made (NED)
- 1975: 1e in 2e etappe deel b Tour d'Indre-et-Loire, Chanceaux (FRA)
- 1975: 1e in Eindklassement Tour d'Indre-et-Loire (FRA)
- 1975: 1e in Rund um den Henninger Turm (GER)
- 1975: 1e in Zele (b) (BEL)
- 1975: 1e in Köln (GER)
- 1975: 1e in Maldegem (b) (BEL)
- 1975: 1e in GP des Nations (FRA)
- 1975: 1e in 4e etappe Étoile des Espoirs, Caen (FRA)
- 1975: 1e in GP Lugano, Chrono (SUI)
- 1976: 1e in GP Aix-en-Provence (FRA)
- 1976: 1e in GP Kanton Aargau Gippingen (SUI)
- 1976: 1e in 1e etappe Tour Méditerranéen, Aubagne (FRA)
- 1976: 1e in 2e etappe deel b Tour Méditerranéen, Mont Faron (FRA)
- 1976: 1e in Eindklassement Tour Méditerranéen (FRA)
- 1976: 1e in Poiré-sur-Vie (FRA)
- 1976: 1e in 6e etappe deel b Criterium du Dauphiné Libéré, Carpentras (FRA)
- 1976: 1e in Bussières (FRA)
- 1977: 1e in 5e etappe deel a Paris – Nice, Plan de Campagne (FRA)
- 1977: 1e in 5e etappe deel b Quatre jours de Dunkerque, Dunkerque (FRA)
- 1978: 1e in 3e etappe Ruota d'Oro (ITA)
- 1978: 1e in Levanger (NOR)
- 1978: 1e in Trofeo Baracchi (ITA)
- 1979: 1e in Essen (BEL)
- 1979: 1e in Ulvenhout (NED)
- 1979: 1e in GP Forli (ITA)
- 1981: 1e in 5e etappe Tirreno – Adriatico, San Benedetto del Tronto (ITA)
- 1981: 1e in Acht van Chaam (NED)
- 1982: 1e in Eindklassement Costa del Azahar (ESP) 1982: 1e in Proloog Costa del Azahar (ESP)

== Retirement and death ==
After retirement in 1982 he became manager of PDM–Concorde in 1986 for a year. He then moved to Portugal and started his own restaurant. He died on 19 September 2006 in Praia de Carvoeiro, aged 55, from a stomach haemorrhage.

== See also ==
- List of Dutch Olympic cyclists
