= Alfredo Chinetti =

Italian cyclist

Personal information
- Born: 11 July 1949 (age 77) Cavaria con Premezzo, Italy

Cycling career
- Sport: Cycling
- Role: Rider

Alfredo Chinetti (born 11 July 1949) is an Italian former professional racing cyclist. He rode in two editions of the Tour de France, nine editions of the Giro d'Italia and one edition of the Vuelta a España.
