= Alfio Vandi =

Italian cyclist

Personal information
- Full name: Alfio Vandi
- Born: 7 December 1955 (age 70) Santarcangelo di Romagna, Italy
- Height: 1.78 m (5 ft 10 in)
- Weight: 64 kg (141 lb)

Cycling career
- Sport: Cycling
- Discipline: Road
- Role: Rider

Professional teams
- 1976–1979: Magniflex
- 1980: Famucucine
- 1981–1982: Selle San Marco
- 1983: Metauro Mobili
- 1984–85: Dromedario
- 1986–87: Ariostea
- 1988: Isoglass

Major wins
- Grand Tours Giro d'Italia Young rider Classification (1976)

Alfio Vandi (born 7 December 1955) is an Italian former professional racing cyclist of the 1970s and 1980s. The highlight of his career was winning the Young rider Classification in the 1976 Giro d'Italia. He placed seventh overall in that Giro. His highest placing in the Giro was fourth in the 1977 Giro d'Italia.
