= Famcucine–Campagnolo =

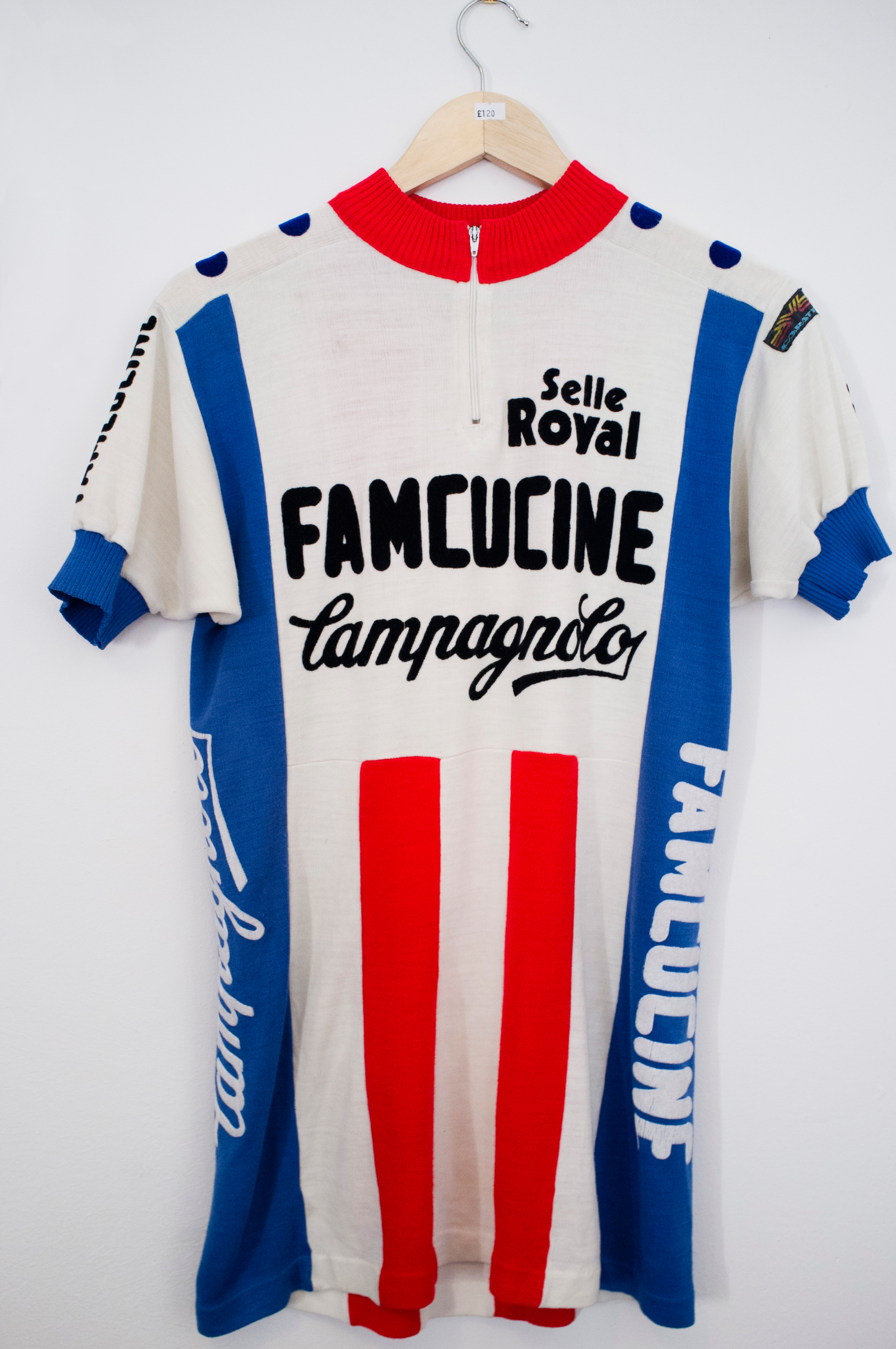
- Famcucine–Campagnolo jersey

Team information
- Registered: Italy
- Founded: 1980
- Disbanded: 1982
- Discipline: Road

Team name history
- 1980–1982: Famcucine–Campagnolo

Famcucine–Campagnolo was an Italian professional cycling team that existed from 1980 to 1982. Its main sponsors were kitchen manufacturer Famcucine and bicycle part manufacturer Campagnolo. Francesco Moser rode for the team in 1981 and 1982.
