= Triptyque Ardennais =

Annual road cycling race in Belgium

Race details
- Date: May
- Discipline: Road
- Type: Stage race

History
- First edition: 1959
- Editions: 56 (as of 2025)
- First winner: Lucien Flohimont (BEL)
- Most wins: No repeat winners
- Most recent: Michiel Hillen (BEL)

The Triptyque Ardennais is a multi-day road cycling race held annually in Belgium since 1959. Since 2022, a junior edition has also taken place.

No cyclist has won the race more than once.

== Winners ==
| Year | Winner | Second | Third |
|---|---|---|---|
| 1959 | (Belgium) Lucien Flohimont | (Netherlands) Fritz Knoops | (Belgium) André Malou |
| 1960 | (Belgium) Willy Bocklant | (Belgium) Willy Monty | (Netherlands) Alfons Steuten |
| 1961 | (Belgium) Marcel Leboutte | (Belgium) Robert Dehogne | (Belgium) Georges Vandenberghe |
| 1962 | (Italy) Carmine Preziosi | (Netherlands) Huub Harings | (Netherlands) Jan Tummers |
| 1963 | (Belgium) Gustave Robijns | (Belgium) Herman Vrancken | (Belgium) Guy Vanderperre |
| 1964 | (Belgium) Roger Engelen | (Belgium) Guy Vallee | (Netherlands) Jan Harings |
| 1965 | (Netherlands) Jan Harings | (Netherlands) Jo van Segelen | (Belgium) Edouard Weckx |
| 1966 | (Belgium) Victor Vandeneynde | (Belgium) Roger Engelen | (Belgium) Roger Rosiers |
| 1967-1974 | No race | | |
| 1975 | (Belgium) Ludo Theunis | (Belgium) Paul Wellens | (Belgium) René Habeaux |
| 1976 | (Belgium) René Martens | (Belgium) Jean-Pierre Henrard | (Belgium) Denis Ertveldt |
| 1977 | (Belgium) Jean-Pierre Henrard | (Netherlands) Gert Pronk | (Belgium) Johan Wellens |
| 1978 | (Netherlands) Gerrit Pronk | (Sweden) Per Sandahl | (New Zealand) Paul Jesson |
| 1979 | (Belgium) Walter Peeters | (Belgium) Luc De Decker | (Netherlands) Théo Peeters |
| 1980 | (Soviet Union) Vladimir Malakhov | (Belgium) Nico Emonds | (Belgium) Jean-Marie Wampers |
| 1981 | (Belgium) Nico Emonds | (Belgium) Marc Van Gyseghem | (Belgium) Willem Van Eynde |
| 1982 | (Belgium) Rudy Claessens | (Belgium) Jos Haex | (Belgium) Francis De Ridder |
| 1983 | (Belgium) Wim Baeyens | (Netherlands) Peter Harings | (Belgium) Benny Surkijn |
| 1984 | (Belgium) Ludo Adriaensen | (Belgium) Pilip Deleye | (Netherlands) Henri Van Lent |
| 1985 | (Netherlands) Peter Harings | (Netherlands) Frans Maassen | (Belgium) Lieven Brackman |
| 1986 | (Netherlands) Marc Deries | (Belgium) Wilfried Peeters | (Netherlands) Wim Jennen |
| 1987 | (Netherlands) Jos van Aert | (Belgium) Alex Debremaecker | (Belgium) Patrick Robeet |
| 1988 | (Belgium) Greg Moens | (Belgium) Alex Debremaecker | (Netherlands) Jos van Aert |
| 1989 | (Belgium) Tony De Ridder | (Belgium) Ronny Thomas | (Belgium) Alex Debremaecker |
| 1990 | (Belgium) Serge Baguet | (Belgium) Patrick Evenepoel | (Belgium) Nick Botteldoorn |
| 1991 | (Netherlands) Gino Jansen | (Netherlands) Martijn Vos | (Belgium) Jean-Michel Thimister |
| 1992 | (Belgium) Wim Vervoort | (Netherlands) Richard Groenendaal | (Belgium) Johan Van Eylen |
| 1993 | (Belgium) Kurt Van De Wouwer | (Denmark) Stig Guldbaek | (Belgium) Frank Vandenbroucke |
| 1994 | (Netherlands) Koos Moerenhout | (Denmark) Stig Guldbaek | (Belgium) Steve De Wolf |
| 1995 | (Belgium) Renaud Boxus | (Belgium) Mario Aerts | (Belgium) Rik Verbrugghe |
| 1996 | (Italy) Dario Pieri | (Italy) Roberto Sgambelluri | (Italy) Oscar Mason |
| 1997 | (Italy) Guido Trentin | (Italy) Federico Giabbecucci | (Sweden) Allen Andersson |
| 1998 | (Italy) Ivan Basso | (Italy) Danilo Di Luca | (Belgium) Davy Daniels |
| 1999 | (Italy) Paolo Tiralongo | (Italy) Andrea Lanzani | (Italy) Graziano Gasparre |
| 2000 | (Italy) Lorenzo Bernucci | (Italy) Franco Pellizotti | (Belgium) Danny Van Looy |
| 2001 | (United States) Danny Pate | (Belgium) Mario Raes | (Belgium) Christophe Stevens |
| 2002 | (Belgium) Philippe Gilbert | (Italy) Antonio Bucciero | (Belgium) Jef Peeters |
| 2003 | (Finland) Jukka Vastaranta | (Netherlands) Pieter Weening | (Netherlands) Marc de Maar |
| 2004 | (France) Laurent Paumier | (France) Yannick Talabardon | (Belgium) Tom Stubbe |
| 2005 | (Netherlands) Jelle van Groezen | (Netherlands) Hans Bloks | (Belgium) Gil Suray |
| 2006 | (United Kingdom) Russell Downing | (Netherlands) Thomas Rabou | (Belgium) Dries Devenyns |
| 2007 | (Belgium) Kenny Van Der Schueren | (Belgium) Jan Ghyselinck | (Belgium) Kevyn Ista |
| 2008 | (Belgium) Jan Bakelants | (Belgium) Thomas De Gendt | (Netherlands) Maarten De Jonge |
| 2009 | (Belgium) Sander Armée | (Netherlands) Maarten De Jonghe | (Belgium) Davy Commeyne |
| 2010 | (Belgium) Laurens De Vreese | (Belgium) Kjell Van Driessche | (Belgium) Edwig Cammaerts |
| 2011 | (Netherlands) Brian Bulgaç | (Germany) Marcel Meisen | (Belgium) Matthias Allegaert |
| 2012 | (New Zealand) Tom David | (Finland) Paavo Paajanen | (Belgium) Antoine Demoitié |
| 2013 | (Belgium) Jérôme Baugnies | (Belgium) Frederik Backaert | (Belgium) Stig Broeckx |
| 2014 | (Belgium) Loïc Vliegen | (Belgium) Gaëtan Bille | (Switzerland) Lukas Spengler |
| 2015 | (Belgium) Aimé De Gendt | (Belgium) Kevin Deltombe | (Belgium) Kevin Pauwels |
| 2016 | (Belgium) Elias Van Breussegem | (Belgium) Brecht Dhaene | (Belgium) Xandro Meurisse |
| 2017 | (Belgium) Gianni Marchand | (Belgium) Laurens Sweeck | (Belgium) Jimmy Janssens |
| 2018 | (Belgium) Jimmy Janssens | (Belgium) Thimo Willems | (Belgium) Brent Van Moer |
| 2019 | (Belgium) Sylvain Moniquet | (Netherlands) Tom Vermeer | (Belgium) Fabio Sinoy |
| 2020-2021 | No race | | |
| 2022 | (Belgium) Lander Loockx | (Belgium) Liam Slock | (Norway) Sebastian Larsen |
| 2023 | (Switzerland) Valentin Darbellay | (Belgium) Daan Soete | (Netherlands) Pepijn Reinderink |
| 2024 | (Netherlands) Wouter Toussaint | (Italy) Simone Gualdi | (Switzerland) Noah Bögli |
| 2025 | (Belgium) Michiel Hillen | (Switzerland) Valentin Darbellay | (Netherlands) David Haverdings |

=== Juniors ===
| Year | Winner | Second | Third |
|---|---|---|---|
| 2022 | (Belgium) Niels Driesen | (Netherlands) Sjoerd te Nijenhuis | (Belgium) Milan Feys |
| 2023 | (Norway) Vetle Gilje Lygra | (Belgium) William Graff | (Belgium) Corneel Vanslembrouck |
| 2024 | (Belgium) Jenthe Verstraete | (Belgium) Lucas Van Gils | (Belgium) Tuur Verbeeck |
