= Jan Harings =

Dutch cyclist born 1945

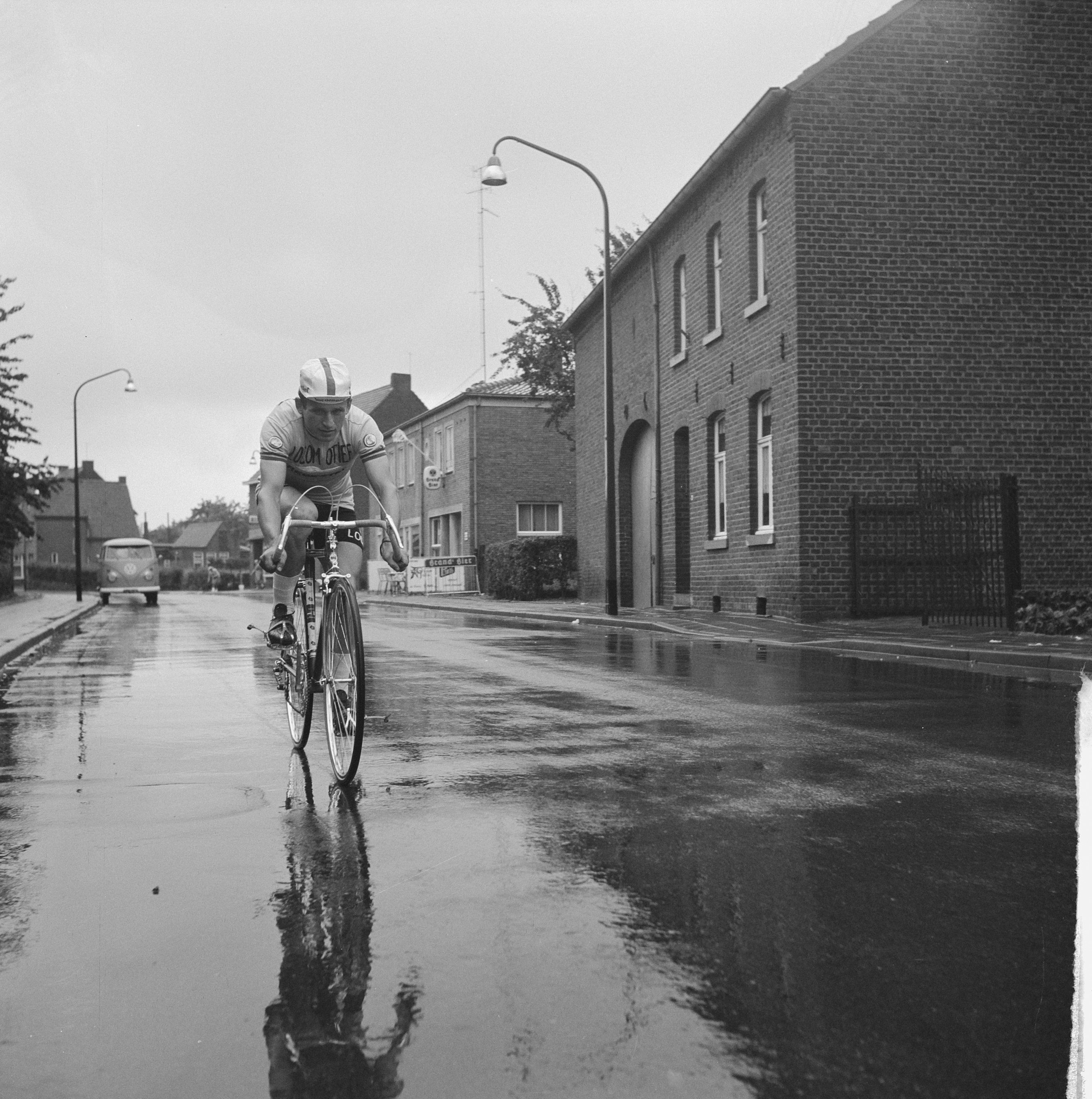

Personal information
- Born: 26 June 1945 (age 81) Scheulder, Eijsden-Margraten, Netherlands

Cycling career
- Sport: Cycling
- Current team: Retired
- Discipline: Road
- Role: Rider

Professional teams
- 1967: Televizier–Batavus
- 1968–1970: Caballero–Wielersport

Major wins
- Grand Tours Vuelta a España 1 individual stage (1967)

Jan Harings (born 26 June 1945) is a Dutch former road cyclist. Professional from 1967 to 1970, he notably won a stage of the 1967 Vuelta a España and finished sixth at the 1969 UCI Road World Championships.

His brothers Ger and Huub and his nephew Peter were also professional cyclists.

== Major results ==
1965
1st Overall Triptyque Ardennais

1st Stages 2a & 3b (ITT)

1967
1st Stage 10a Vuelta a España
10th Scheldeprijs
1968
2nd Druivenkoers-Overijse
3rd Road race, National Road Championships
3rd Grand Prix Cerami
3rd Circuit des Frontières
6th Züri-Metzgete
7th Scheldeprijs
1969
1st Manx Trophy
1st GP Flandria
3rd Acht van Chaam
6th Road race, UCI Road World Championships
1970
10th Züri-Metzgete
