= Tom Criel =

Belgian cyclist

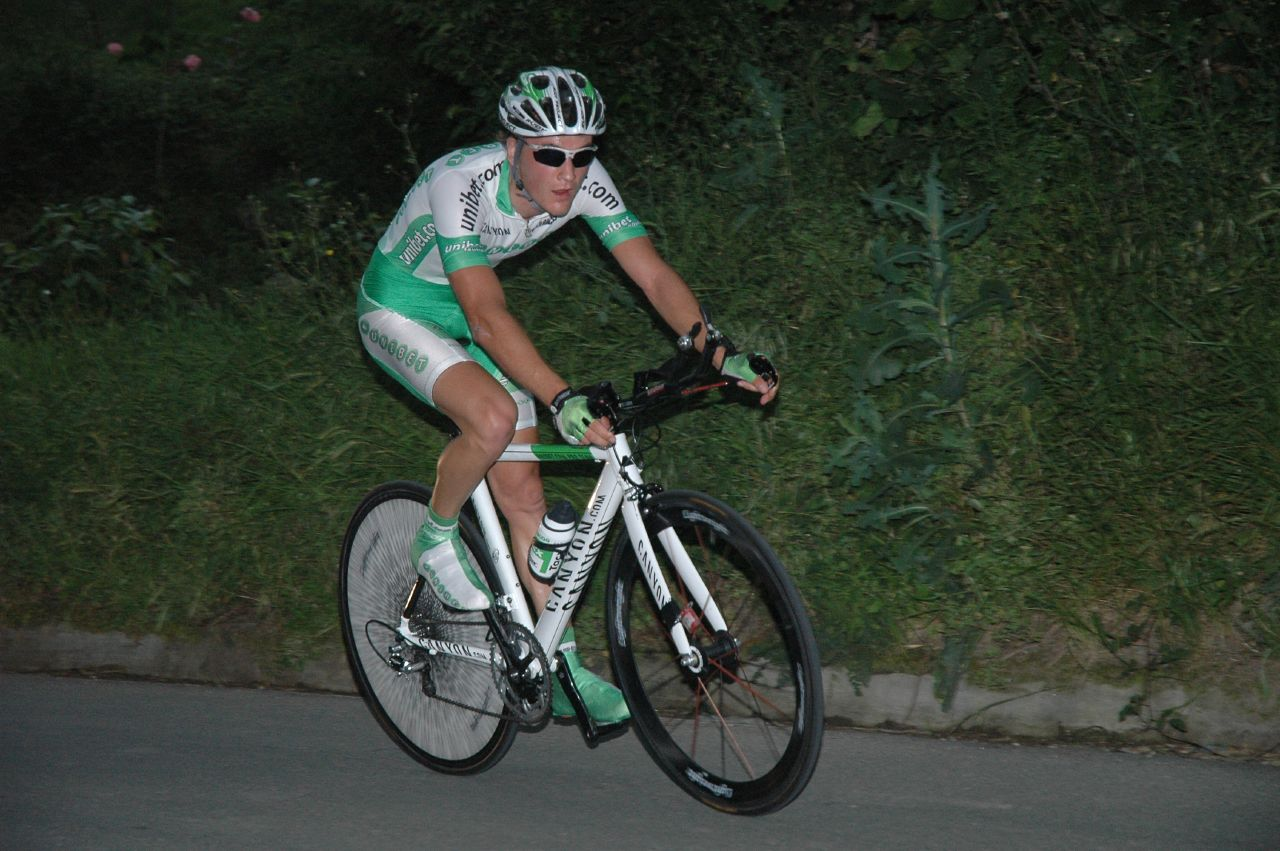

Personal information
- Born: 6 June 1983 (age 43) Eeklo, Belgium

Cycling career
- Sport: Cycling
- Current team: Retired
- Discipline: Road
- Role: Rider

Professional teams
- 2007–2008: Unibet.com
- 2009: Topsport Vlaanderen

Tom Criel (born 6 June 1983 in Eeklo) is a former Belgian cyclist.

== Palmarès ==
2006
3rd Giro della Valle d'Aosta

1st Stage 5

4th De Vlaamse Pijl
2007
1st Brussels-Opwijk
2008
6th Grote Prijs Jef Scherens
2009
3rd Internationale Wielertrofee Jong Maar Moedig
2011
East Flanders Road Race Champion
