= 1979 Giro d'Italia, Prologue to Stage 9 =

Cycling race stages

The 1979 Giro d'Italia was the 62nd edition of the Giro d'Italia, one of cycling's Grand Tours. The Giro began with a prologue individual time trial in Florence on 17 May, and Stage 9 occurred on 26 May with a mountainous stage to Pistoia. The race finished in Milan on 6 June.

== Prologue ==
17 May 1979 — Florence to Florence, 8 km (5 mi) (ITT)

Prologue result and general classification after Prologue

Rank	Rider	Team	Time
1	Francesco Moser (ITA)	Sanson–Luxor TV–Campagnolo	11' 05"
2	Giuseppe Saronni (ITA)	Scic–Bottecchia	+ 3"
3	Knut Knudsen (NOR)	Bianchi–Faema	+ 6"
4	Michel Laurent (FRA)	Peugeot–Esso–Michelin	+ 14"
5	Roger De Vlaeminck (BEL)	Gis Gelati	+ 20"
6	Bernt Johansson (SWE)	Magniflex–Famcucine	+ 26"
7	Jean-Luc Vandenbroucke (BEL)	Peugeot–Esso–Michelin	s.t.
8	Johan De Muynck (BEL)	Bianchi–Faema	+ 32"
9	Roberto Visentini (ITA)	CBM Fast–Gaggia	+ 34"
10	Mario Beccia (ITA)	Mecap–Hoonved	+ 35"

== Stage 1 ==
18 May 1979 — Florence to Perugia, 156 km (97 mi)

Stage 1 result

Rank	Rider	Team	Time
1	Mario Beccia (ITA)	Mecap–Hoonved	4h 03' 34"
2	Knut Knudsen (NOR)	Bianchi–Faema	+ 2"
3	Roger De Vlaeminck (BEL)	Gis Gelati	s.t.
4	Pierino Gavazzi (ITA)	Zonca–Santini	s.t.
5	Giuseppe Saronni (ITA)	Scic–Bottecchia	s.t.
6	Francesco Moser (ITA)	Sanson–Luxor TV–Campagnolo	s.t.
7	Fausto Bertoglio (ITA)	San Giacomo–Mobilificio	s.t.
8	Bruno Wolfer (SUI)	Zonca–Santini	s.t.
9	Gottfried Schmutz (SUI)	Willora–Piz Buin–Bonanza	s.t.
10	Leonardo Natale (ITA)	Sapa Assicurazioni	s.t.

General classification after Stage 1

Rank	Rider	Team	Time
1	Francesco Moser (ITA)	Sanson–Luxor TV–Campagnolo	4h 14' 41"
2	Giuseppe Saronni (ITA)	Scic–Bottecchia	+ 3"
3	Knut Knudsen (NOR)	Bianchi–Faema	+ 6"
4	Roger De Vlaeminck (BEL)	Gis Gelati	+ 20"
5	Michel Laurent (FRA)	Peugeot–Esso–Michelin	+ 25"
6	Mario Beccia (ITA)	Mecap–Hoonved	+ 33"
7	Fausto Bertoglio (ITA)	San Giacomo–Mobilificio	+ 36"
8	Bernt Johansson (SWE)	Magniflex–Famcucine	+ 37"
9	Johan De Muynck (BEL)	Bianchi–Faema	+ 43"
10	Roberto Visentini (ITA)	CBM Fast–Gaggia	+ 45"

== Stage 2 ==
19 May 1979 — Perugia to Castel Gandolfo, 204 km (127 mi)

Stage 2 result

Rank	Rider	Team	Time
1	Roger De Vlaeminck (BEL)	Gis Gelati	5h 32' 37"
2	Francesco Moser (ITA)	Sanson–Luxor TV–Campagnolo	s.t.
3	Vittorio Algeri (ITA)	Sapa Assicurazioni	s.t.
4	Giuseppe Saronni (ITA)	Scic–Bottecchia	s.t.
5	Gottfried Schmutz (SUI)	Willora–Piz Buin–Bonanza	s.t.
6	Pierino Gavazzi (ITA)	Zonca–Santini	s.t.
7	Knut Knudsen (NOR)	Bianchi–Faema	s.t.
8	Michel Laurent (FRA)	Peugeot–Esso–Michelin	s.t.
9	Bernt Johansson (SWE)	Magniflex–Famcucine	s.t.
10	Franco Conti (ITA)	San Giacomo–Mobilificio	s.t.

General classification after Stage 2

Rank	Rider	Team	Time
1	Francesco Moser (ITA)	Sanson–Luxor TV–Campagnolo	9h 47' 18"
2	Giuseppe Saronni (ITA)	Scic–Bottecchia	+ 3"
3	Knut Knudsen (NOR)	Bianchi–Faema	+ 6"
4	Roger De Vlaeminck (BEL)	Gis Gelati	+ 20"
5	Michel Laurent (FRA)	Peugeot–Esso–Michelin	+ 25"
6	Mario Beccia (ITA)	Mecap–Hoonved	+ 33"
7	Fausto Bertoglio (ITA)	San Giacomo–Mobilificio	+ 36"
8	Bernt Johansson (SWE)	Magniflex–Famcucine	+ 37"
9	Johan De Muynck (BEL)	Bianchi–Faema	+ 43"
10	Roberto Visentini (ITA)	CBM Fast–Gaggia	+ 45"

== Stage 3 ==
20 May 1979 — Caserta to Naples, 31 km (19 mi) (ITT)

Stage 3 result

Rank	Rider	Team	Time
1	Francesco Moser (ITA)	Sanson–Luxor TV–Campagnolo	37' 32"
2	Knut Knudsen (NOR)	Bianchi–Faema	+ 24"
3	Giuseppe Saronni (ITA)	Scic–Bottecchia	+ 26"
4	Michel Laurent (FRA)	Peugeot–Esso–Michelin	+ 34"
5	Roger De Vlaeminck (BEL)	Gis Gelati	+ 1' 28"
6	Bernt Johansson (SWE)	Magniflex–Famcucine	+ 1' 32"
7	Gregor Braun (FRG)	Peugeot–Esso–Michelin	+ 2' 00"
8	Mario Beccia (ITA)	Mecap–Hoonved	+ 2' 04"
9	Roy Schuiten (NED)	Scic–Bottecchia	+ 2' 06"
10	Jean-Luc Vandenbroucke (BEL)	Peugeot–Esso–Michelin	s.t.

General classification after Stage 3

Rank	Rider	Team	Time
1	Francesco Moser (ITA)	Sanson–Luxor TV–Campagnolo	10h 24' 50"
2	Giuseppe Saronni (ITA)	Scic–Bottecchia	+ 29"
3	Knut Knudsen (NOR)	Bianchi–Faema	+ 30"
4	Michel Laurent (FRA)	Peugeot–Esso–Michelin	+ 59"
5	Roger De Vlaeminck (BEL)	Gis Gelati	+ 1' 48"
6	Bernt Johansson (SWE)	Magniflex–Famcucine	+ 2' 09"
7	Fausto Bertoglio (ITA)	San Giacomo–Mobilificio	+ 2' 22"
8	Mario Beccia (ITA)	Mecap–Hoonved	+ 2' 37"
9	Johan De Muynck (BEL)	Bianchi–Faema	+ 2' 54"
10	Silvano Contini (ITA)	Bianchi–Faema	+ 3' 18"

== Stage 4 ==
21 May 1979 — Caserta to Potenza, 210 km (130 mi)

Stage 4 result

Rank	Rider	Team	Time
1	Claudio Bortolotto (ITA)	Sanson–Luxor TV–Campagnolo	6h 01' 30"
2	Mario Beccia (ITA)	Mecap–Hoonved	+ 2"
3	Giuseppe Saronni (ITA)	Scic–Bottecchia	+ 32"
4	Knut Knudsen (NOR)	Bianchi–Faema	s.t.
5	Gottfried Schmutz (SUI)	Willora–Piz Buin–Bonanza	s.t.
6	Joseph Fuchs (SUI)	Scic–Bottecchia	s.t.
7	Amilcare Sgalbazzi (ITA)	Magniflex–Famcucine	s.t.
8	Francesco Moser (ITA)	Sanson–Luxor TV–Campagnolo	s.t.
9	Bernt Johansson (SWE)	Magniflex–Famcucine	s.t.
10	Franco Conti (ITA)	San Giacomo–Mobilificio	s.t.

General classification after Stage 4

Rank	Rider	Team	Time
1	Francesco Moser (ITA)	Sanson–Luxor TV–Campagnolo	16h 26' 52"
2	Giuseppe Saronni (ITA)	Scic–Bottecchia	+ 29"
3	Knut Knudsen (NOR)	Bianchi–Faema	+ 30"
4	Michel Laurent (FRA)	Peugeot–Esso–Michelin	+ 59"
5	Mario Beccia (ITA)	Mecap–Hoonved	+ 2' 07"
6	Bernt Johansson (SWE)	Magniflex–Famcucine	+ 2' 09"
7	Silvano Contini (ITA)	Bianchi–Faema	+ 3' 18"
8	Roger De Vlaeminck (BEL)	Gis Gelati	+ 3' 23"
9	Joseph Fuchs (SUI)	Scic–Bottecchia	+ 4' 21"
10	Fausto Bertoglio (ITA)	San Giacomo–Mobilificio	+ 4' 37"

== Stage 5 ==
22 May 1979 — Potenza to Vieste, 223 km (139 mi)

Stage 5 result

Rank	Rider	Team	Time
1	Giuseppe Saronni (ITA)	Scic–Bottecchia	6h 12' 41"
2	Francesco Moser (ITA)	Sanson–Luxor TV–Campagnolo	s.t.
3	Roger De Vlaeminck (BEL)	Gis Gelati	s.t.
4	Leonardo Mazzantini (ITA)	Zonca–Santini	s.t.
5	Knut Knudsen (NOR)	Bianchi–Faema	s.t.
6	Roberto Ceruti (ITA)	Magniflex–Famcucine	s.t.
7	Luciano Rossignoli (ITA)	Mecap–Hoonved	s.t.
8	Walter Dusi (ITA)	Sapa Assicurazioni	s.t.
9	Vincenzo De Caro (ITA)	Mecap–Hoonved	s.t.
10	Claudio Bortolotto (ITA)	Sanson–Luxor TV–Campagnolo	s.t.

General classification after Stage 5

Rank	Rider	Team	Time
1	Francesco Moser (ITA)	Sanson–Luxor TV–Campagnolo	22h 39' 33"
2	Giuseppe Saronni (ITA)	Scic–Bottecchia	+ 29"
3	Knut Knudsen (NOR)	Bianchi–Faema	+ 30"
4	Michel Laurent (FRA)	Peugeot–Esso–Michelin	+ 59"
5	Mario Beccia (ITA)	Mecap–Hoonved	+ 2' 07"
6	Bernt Johansson (SWE)	Magniflex–Famcucine	+ 2' 09"
7	Silvano Contini (ITA)	Bianchi–Faema	+ 3' 18"
8	Roger De Vlaeminck (BEL)	Gis Gelati	+ 3' 23"
9	Joseph Fuchs (SUI)	Scic–Bottecchia	+ 4' 21"
10	Fausto Bertoglio (ITA)	San Giacomo–Mobilificio	+ 4' 37"

== Stage 6 ==
23 May 1979 — Vieste to Chieti, 260 km (160 mi)

Stage 6 result

Rank	Rider	Team	Time
1	Bruno Wolfer (SUI)	Zonca–Santini	7h 06' 14"
2	Angelo Tosoni (ITA)	CBM Fast–Gaggia	+ 1' 19"
3	Giuseppe Saronni (ITA)	Scic–Bottecchia	+ 3' 29"
4	Knut Knudsen (NOR)	Bianchi–Faema	+ 3' 30"
5	Roger De Vlaeminck (BEL)	Gis Gelati	+ 3' 34"
6	Vittorio Algeri (ITA)	Sapa Assicurazioni	s.t.
7	Wladimiro Panizza (ITA)	Sanson–Luxor TV–Campagnolo	+ 3' 36"
8	Francesco Moser (ITA)	Sanson–Luxor TV–Campagnolo	s.t.
9	Mario Beccia (ITA)	Mecap–Hoonved	s.t.
10	Bernt Johansson (SWE)	Magniflex–Famcucine	s.t.

General classification after Stage 6

Rank	Rider	Team	Time
1	Francesco Moser (ITA)	Sanson–Luxor TV–Campagnolo	29h 49' 23"
2	Giuseppe Saronni (ITA)	Scic–Bottecchia	+ 22"
3	Knut Knudsen (NOR)	Bianchi–Faema	+ 24"
4	Michel Laurent (FRA)	Peugeot–Esso–Michelin	+ 59"
5	Mario Beccia (ITA)	Mecap–Hoonved	+ 2' 07"
6	Bernt Johansson (SWE)	Magniflex–Famcucine	+ 2' 09"
7	Silvano Contini (ITA)	Bianchi–Faema	+ 3' 18"
8	Roger De Vlaeminck (BEL)	Gis Gelati	+ 3' 21"
9	Joseph Fuchs (SUI)	Scic–Bottecchia	+ 4' 25"
10	Fausto Bertoglio (ITA)	San Giacomo–Mobilificio	+ 4' 41"

== Stage 7 ==
24 May 1979 — Chieti to Pesaro, 252 km (157 mi)

Stage 7 result

Rank	Rider	Team	Time
1	Alan Van Heerden (RSA)	Peugeot–Esso–Michelin	6h 42' 50"
2	Salvatore Maccali (ITA)	Bianchi–Faema	s.t.
3	Sergio Santimaria (ITA)	Mecap–Hoonved	s.t.
4	Marino Amadori (ITA)	Sapa Assicurazioni	+ 2"
5	Fulvio Bertacco (ITA)	CBM Fast–Gaggia	+ 4"
6	Giancarlo Torelli (ITA)	Zonca–Santini	+ 34"
7	Mario Fraccaro (ITA)	Mecap–Hoonved	s.t.
8	Jean-Luc Vandenbroucke (BEL)	Peugeot–Esso–Michelin	s.t.
9	Marcello Osler (ITA)	Sanson–Luxor TV–Campagnolo	s.t.
10	Roger Legeay (FRA)	Peugeot–Esso–Michelin	s.t.

General classification after Stage 7

Rank	Rider	Team	Time
1	Francesco Moser (ITA)	Sanson–Luxor TV–Campagnolo	36h 34' 33"
2	Giuseppe Saronni (ITA)	Scic–Bottecchia	+ 22"
3	Knut Knudsen (NOR)	Bianchi–Faema	+ 24"
4	Michel Laurent (FRA)	Peugeot–Esso–Michelin	+ 59"
5	Mario Beccia (ITA)	Mecap–Hoonved	+ 2' 07"
6	Bernt Johansson (SWE)	Magniflex–Famcucine	+ 2' 09"
7	Silvano Contini (ITA)	Bianchi–Faema	+ 3' 18"
8	Roger De Vlaeminck (BEL)	Gis Gelati	+ 3' 21"
9	Joseph Fuchs (SUI)	Scic–Bottecchia	+ 4' 25"
10	Marino Amadori (ITA)	Sapa Assicurazioni	+ 4' 39"

== Stage 8 ==
25 May 1979 — Rimini to San Marino, 28 km (17 mi) (ITT)

Stage 8 result

Rank	Rider	Team	Time
1	Giuseppe Saronni (ITA)	Scic–Bottecchia	45' 56"
2	Knut Knudsen (NOR)	Bianchi–Faema	+ 32"
3	Bernt Johansson (SWE)	Magniflex–Famcucine	+ 1' 17"
4	Francesco Moser (ITA)	Sanson–Luxor TV–Campagnolo	+ 1' 24"
5	Mario Beccia (ITA)	Mecap–Hoonved	+ 1' 48"
6	Fausto Bertoglio (ITA)	San Giacomo–Mobilificio	+ 1' 54"
7	Roberto Visentini (ITA)	CBM Fast–Gaggia	+ 2' 04"
8	Michel Laurent (FRA)	Peugeot–Esso–Michelin	+ 2' 22"
9	Silvano Contini (ITA)	Bianchi–Faema	+ 2' 28"
10	Joseph Fuchs (SUI)	Scic–Bottecchia	+ 3' 05"

General classification after Stage 8

Rank	Rider	Team	Time
1	Giuseppe Saronni (ITA)	Scic–Bottecchia	37h 20' 51"
2	Knut Knudsen (NOR)	Bianchi–Faema	+ 34"
3	Francesco Moser (ITA)	Sanson–Luxor TV–Campagnolo	+ 1' 02"
4	Michel Laurent (FRA)	Peugeot–Esso–Michelin	+ 2' 59"
5	Bernt Johansson (SWE)	Magniflex–Famcucine	+ 3' 04"
6	Mario Beccia (ITA)	Mecap–Hoonved	+ 3' 33"
7	Silvano Contini (ITA)	Bianchi–Faema	+ 5' 24"
8	Fausto Bertoglio (ITA)	San Giacomo–Mobilificio	+ 6' 13"
9	Joseph Fuchs (SUI)	Scic–Bottecchia	+ 7' 08"
10	Gottfried Schmutz (SUI)	Willora–Piz Buin–Bonanza	+ 8' 14"

== Stage 9 ==
26 May 1979 — San Marino to Pistoia, 248 km (154 mi)

Stage 9 result

Rank	Rider	Team	Time
1	Roger De Vlaeminck (BEL)	Gis Gelati	6h 56' 47"
2	Michel Laurent (FRA)	Peugeot–Esso–Michelin	s.t.
3	Claudio Bortolotto (ITA)	Sanson–Luxor TV–Campagnolo	s.t.
4	Bernt Johansson (SWE)	Magniflex–Famcucine	s.t.
5	Bruno Wolfer (SUI)	Zonca–Santini	s.t.
6	Gottfried Schmutz (SUI)	Willora–Piz Buin–Bonanza	s.t.
7	Francesco Moser (ITA)	Sanson–Luxor TV–Campagnolo	s.t.
8	Mario Beccia (ITA)	Mecap–Hoonved	s.t.
9	Silvano Contini (ITA)	Bianchi–Faema	s.t.
10	Giuseppe Saronni (ITA)	Scic–Bottecchia	s.t.

General classification after Stage 9

Rank	Rider	Team	Time
1	Giuseppe Saronni (ITA)	Scic–Bottecchia	44h 17' 38"
2	Knut Knudsen (NOR)	Bianchi–Faema	+ 34"
3	Francesco Moser (ITA)	Sanson–Luxor TV–Campagnolo	+ 1' 02"
4	Michel Laurent (FRA)	Peugeot–Esso–Michelin	+ 2' 59"
5	Bernt Johansson (SWE)	Magniflex–Famcucine	+ 3' 04"
6	Mario Beccia (ITA)	Mecap–Hoonved	+ 3' 33"
7	Silvano Contini (ITA)	Bianchi–Faema	+ 5' 24"
8	Fausto Bertoglio (ITA)	San Giacomo–Mobilificio	+ 6' 13"
9	Joseph Fuchs (SUI)	Scic–Bottecchia	+ 7' 08"
10	Gottfried Schmutz (SUI)	Willora–Piz Buin–Bonanza	+ 8' 14"
