= Grand Tour (cycling) =

Cycling races Giro d'Italia, Tour de France and Vuelta a España

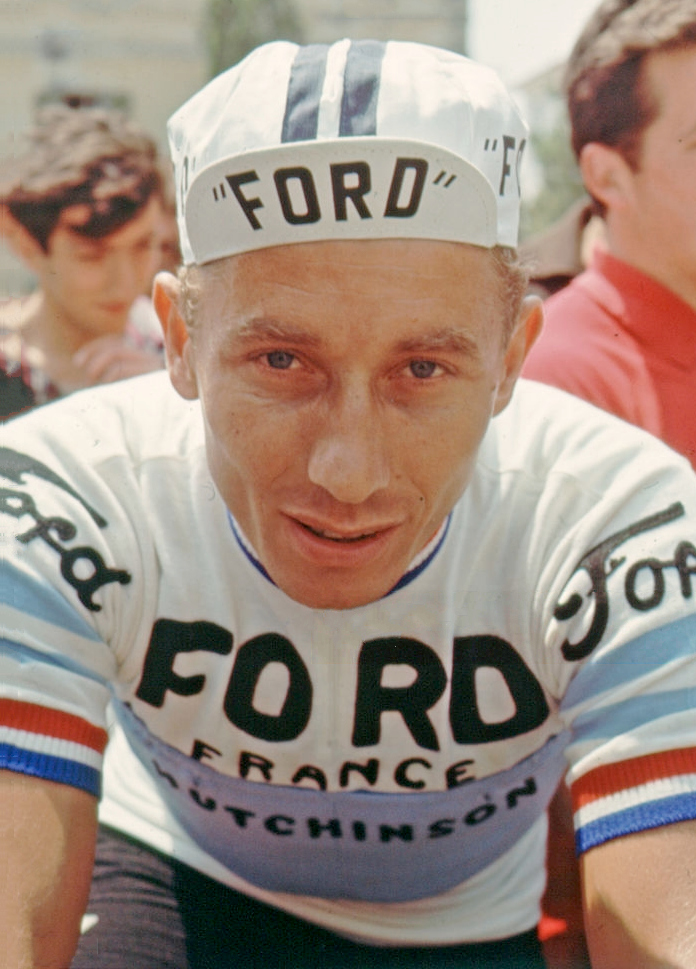
(France) Jacques Anquetil

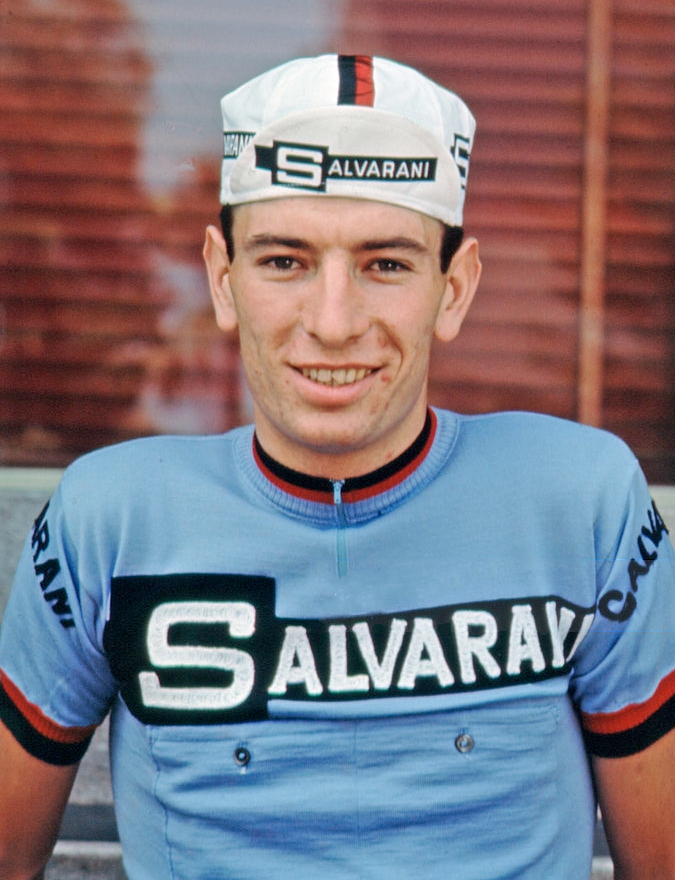
(Italy) Felice Gimondi

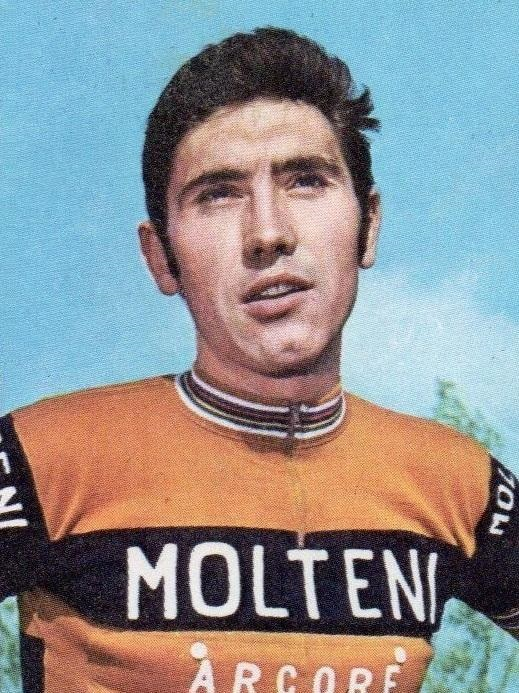
(Belgium) Eddy Merckx

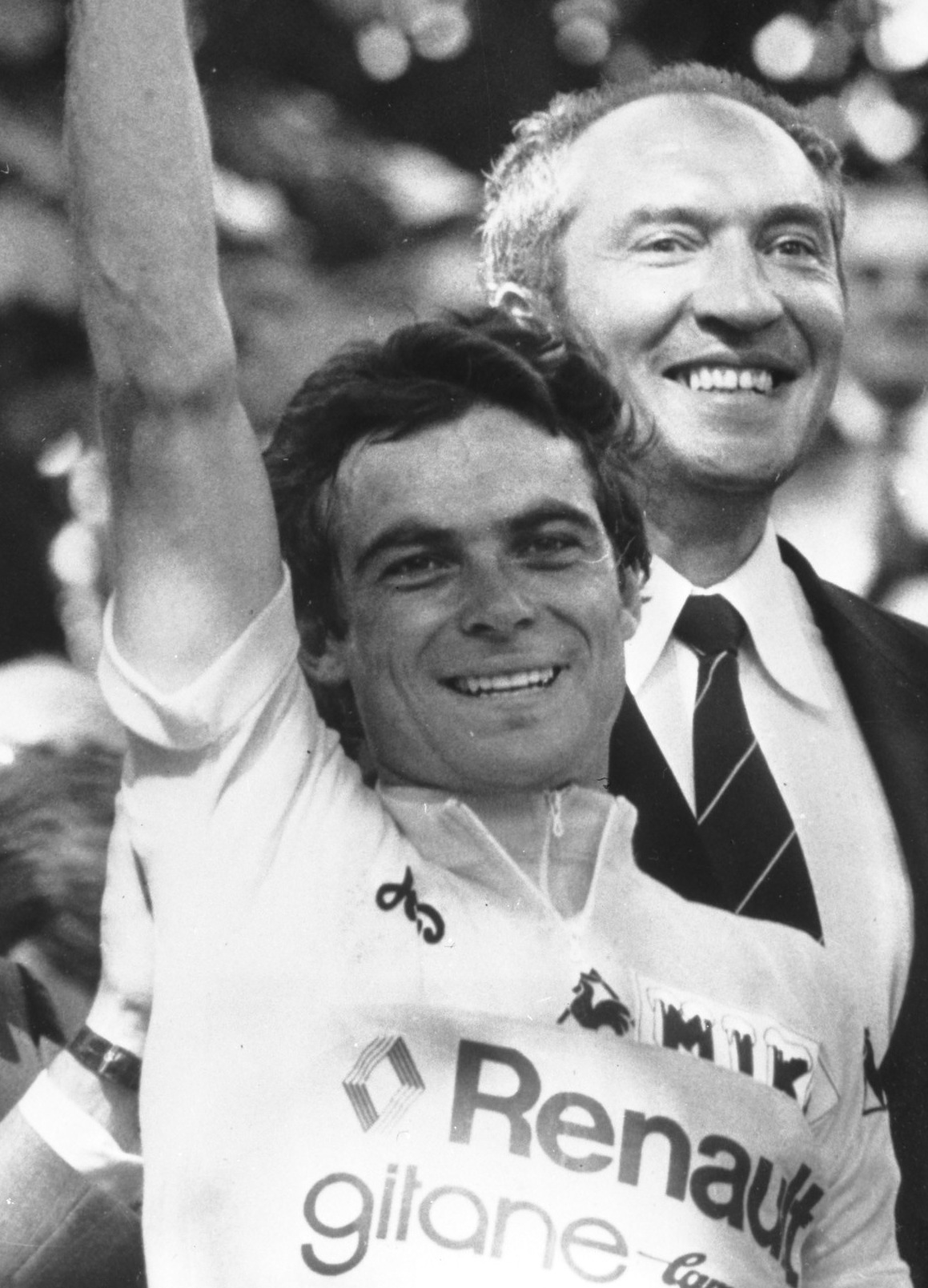
(France) Bernard Hinault

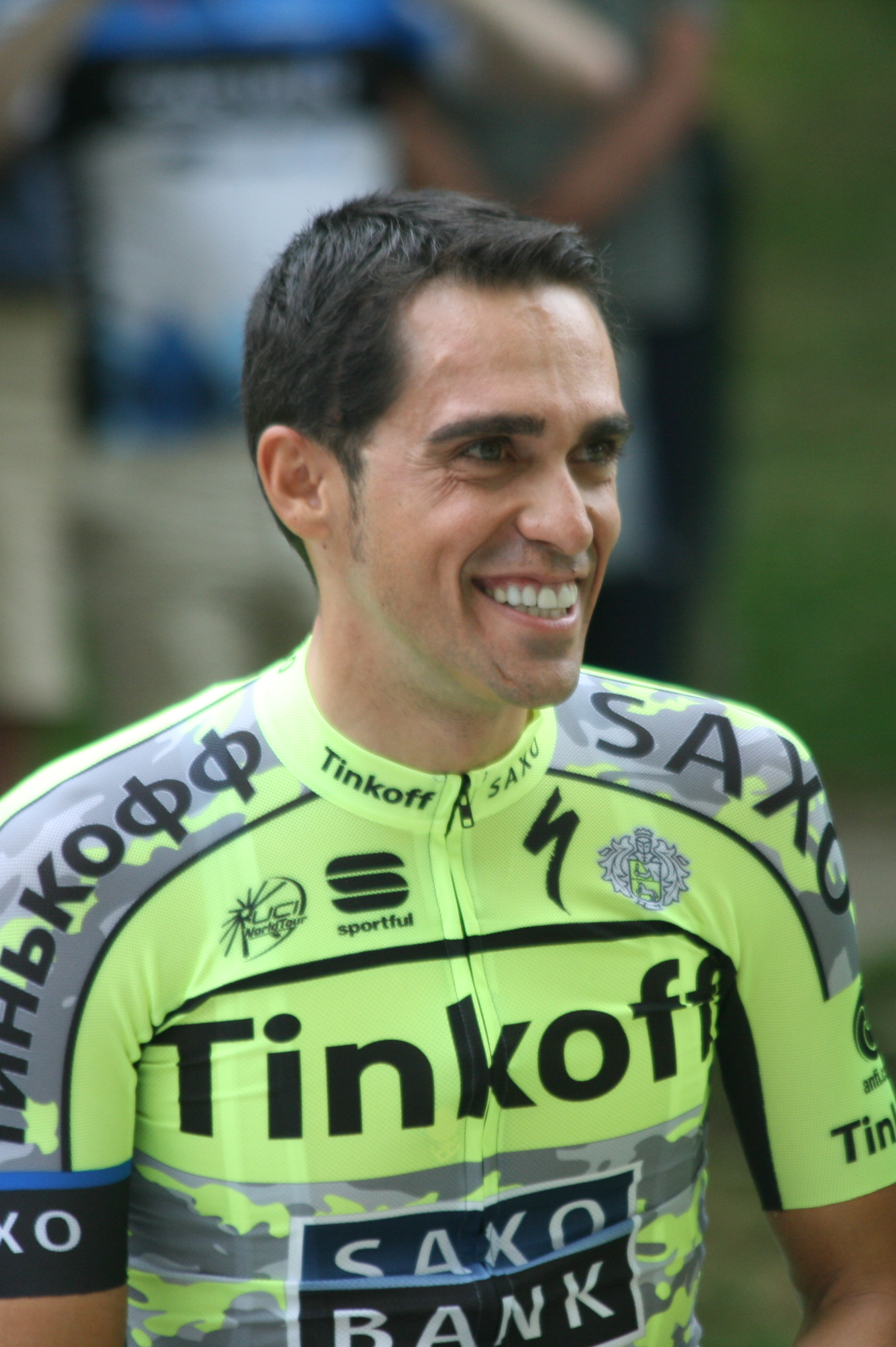
(Spain) Alberto Contador

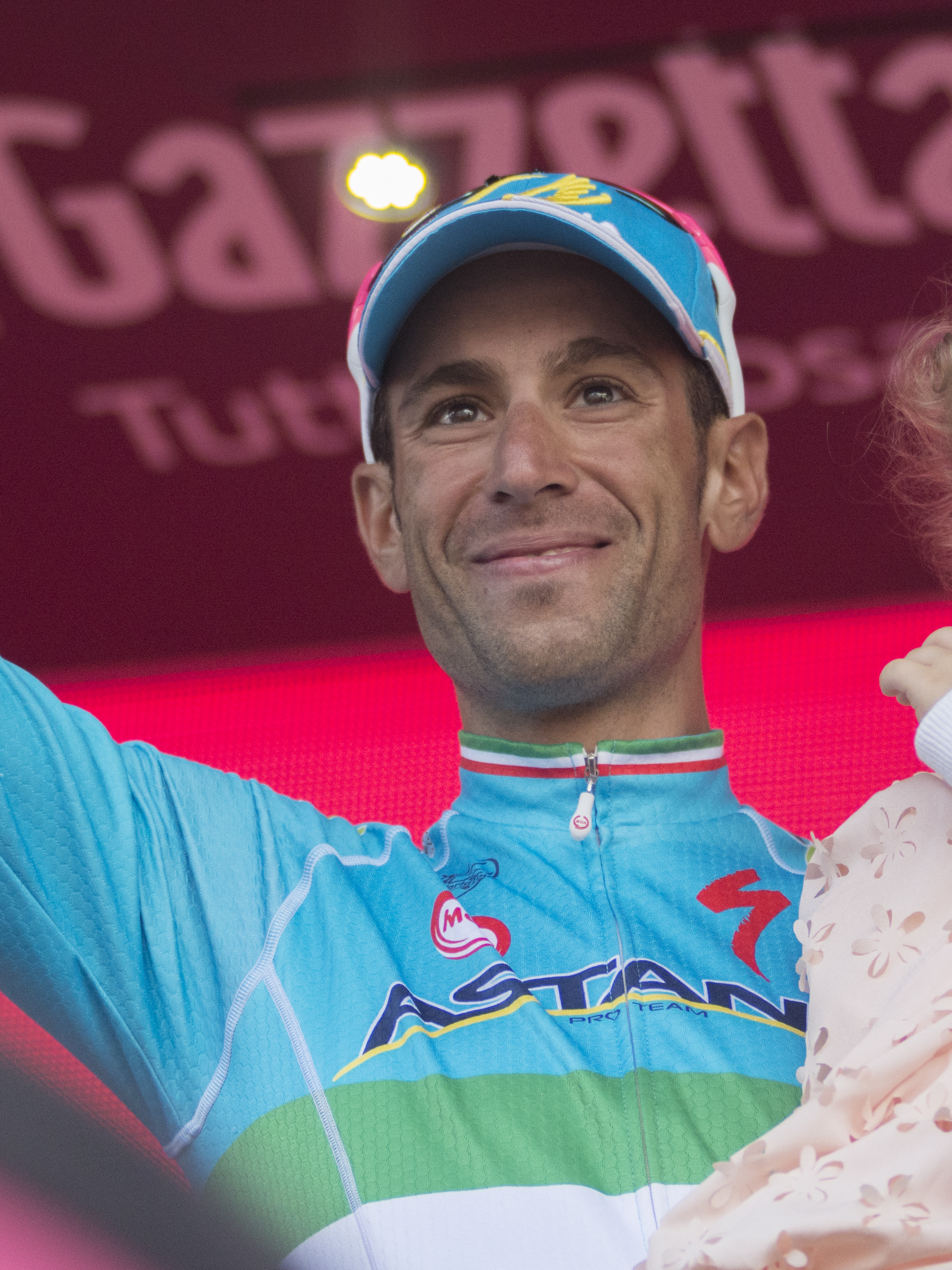
(Italy) Vincenzo Nibali

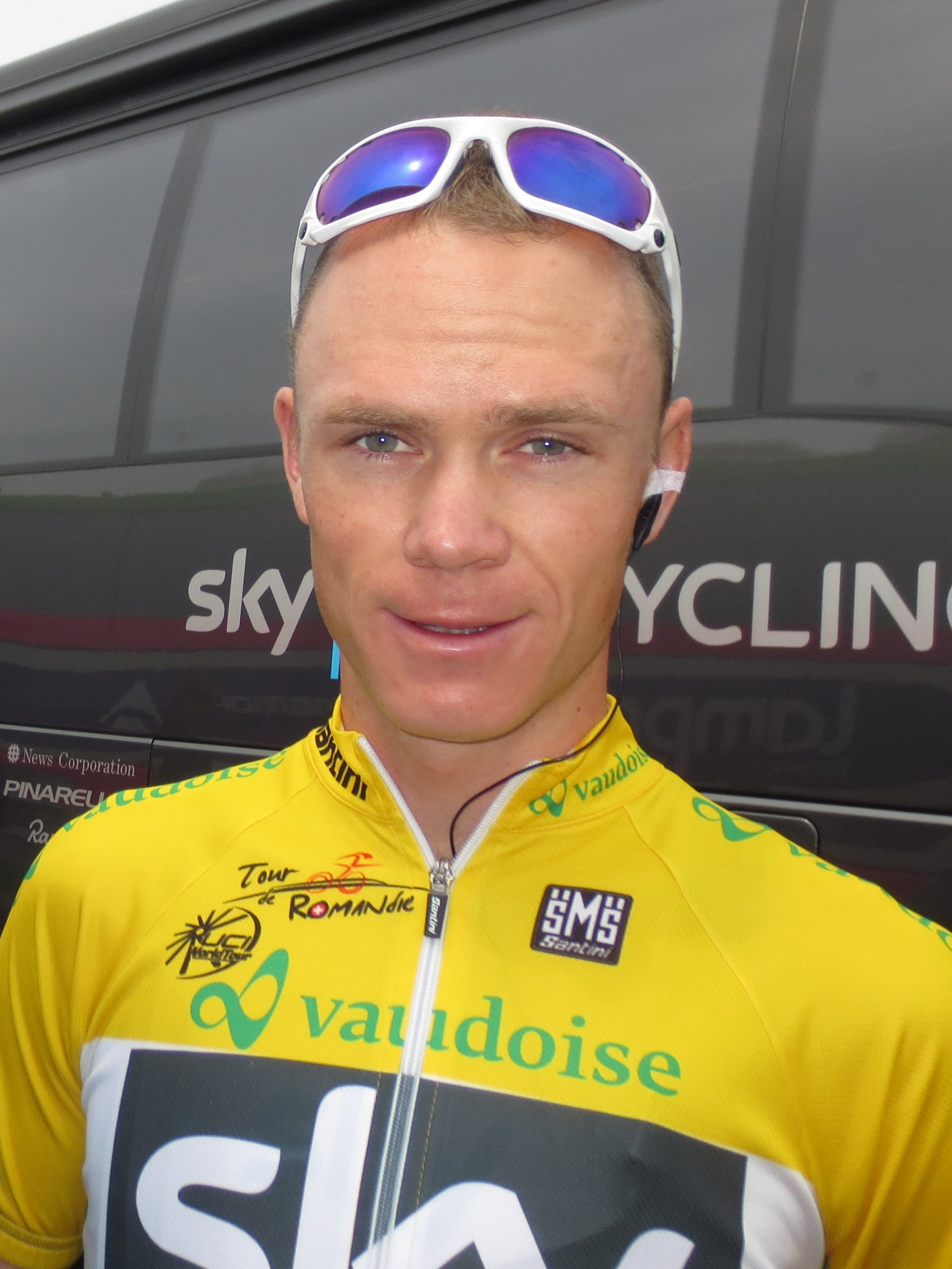
(United Kingdom) Chris Froome

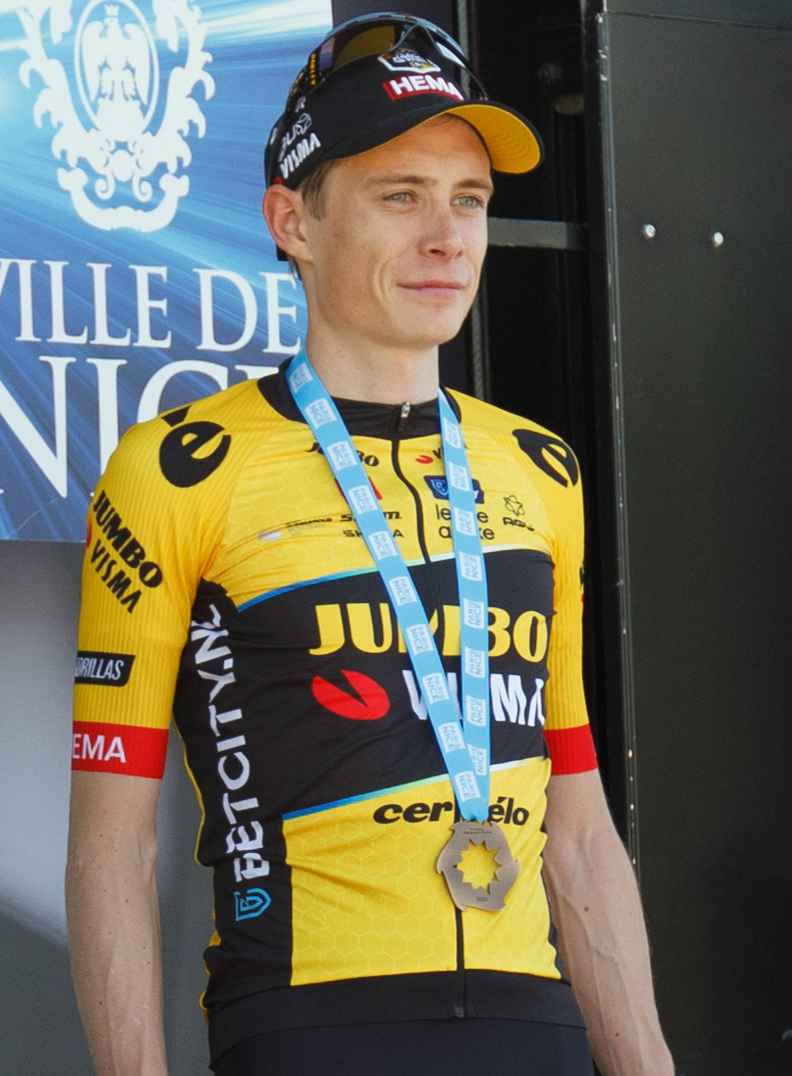
(Denmark) Jonas Vingegaard

The eight cyclists who have won all three tours. Only Contador and Hinault have won each Grand Tour at least twice, and only Merckx, Hinault and Froome have won all three tours consecutively.

In road bicycle racing, a Grand Tour is one of the three major European professional cycling stage races: Giro d'Italia, Tour de France, and Vuelta a España. Collectively they are termed the Grand Tours, and all three races are similar in format, being three-week races with daily stages. They have a special status in the UCI regulations: more points for the UCI World Tour are distributed in Grand Tours than in other races, and they are the only stage races allowed to last longer than 14 days, and these differ from major stage races more than one week in duration.

All three races have a substantial history, with the Tour de France first held in 1903, Giro d'Italia first held in 1909 and the Vuelta a España first held in 1935. The Giro is generally run in May, the Tour in July, and the Vuelta in late August and September. The Vuelta was originally held in the spring, usually late April, with a few editions held in June in the 1940s. In 1995, however, the race moved to September to avoid direct competition with the Giro.

The Tour de France is the oldest and most prestigious in terms of points accrued to racers of all three, and is the most widely attended annual sporting event in the world. The Tour, the Giro and the Road World Cycling Championship make up the Triple Crown of Cycling.

The three Grand Tours are men's events, and as of 2026, no three week races currently exist on the women's road cycling circuit. The Vuelta Femenina, Giro d'Italia Women and Tour de France Femmes are sometimes considered to be equivalent races for women – taking place over shorter, smaller routes around a week in length. The Vuelta Femenina was first held under that name in 2023, the Giro d'Italia Women was first held in 1988, and various women's Tour de France events have taken place since 1984 – with the Tour de France Femmes having its first edition in 2022.

== Description ==
In their current form, the Grand Tours are held over three consecutive weeks and typically include two rest days near the beginning of the second and third weeks. If the opening stages are in a country not neighbouring the home nation of the race, there is sometimes an additional rest day after the opening weekend to allow for transfers. The stages are a mix of long massed start races (sometimes including mountain and hill climbs and descents; others are flat stages favoring those with a sprint finish) and individual and team time trials. Stages in the Grand Tours are generally under 200 kilometres in length.

=== UCI rules regarding 'Grand Tours' ===
Grand Tour events have specific rules and criteria as part of Union Cycliste Internationale (UCI) regulations. For the UCI World Tour, more points are given in grand tours than in other races; the winner of the Tour de France receives 1000 points, and the winners of the Giro and Vuelta receive 850 points. Depending on the nature of other races, points vary for the winner of the overall classification The grand tours have a special status for the length: they are allowed to last between 15 and 23 days – whereas other stage races are not allowed to last longer than 14 days.

=== Teams ===
Historically, controversy surrounds which teams are invited to the event by the organiser. Typically, the UCI prefers top-rated professional teams to enter, while operators of the Grand Tours often want teams based in their country or those unlikely to cause controversy. Between 2005 and 2007, organisers had to accept all ProTour teams, leaving only two wildcard teams per Tour. However, the Unibet team, a ProTour team normally guaranteed entry, was banned from the three Grand Tours for violating gambling advertising laws. In 2008, following numerous doping scandals, some teams were refused entry to the Grand Tours: Astana did not compete at the 2008 Tour de France and Team Columbia did not compete at the 2008 Vuelta a España.

Since 2011, under UCI World Tour rules, all eighteen UCI WorldTeams are guaranteed a place in all three events, as well as the top two UCI ProTeams from the previous year's world ranking. As of 2025, the race organizers are free to invite two more wildcard teams from the top 40 teams in the world ranking (shrinking to the top 30 in 2026). This new rule is intended to prevent organizers from favoring low-ranked domestic teams, such as the 2023 Vuelta a España, where Burgos BH were ranked 62nd and invited over many higher performing teams.

In 2023, Team Jumbo–Visma riders Primož Roglič, Jonas Vingegaard and Sepp Kuss won the Giro, Tour and Vuelta respectively, making the team the first to win all three Grand Tours in a single calendar year.

=== Competitions ===
The main competition is the individual general classification, decided on aggregate time (sometimes after allowance of time bonuses). There are also classifications for teams and young riders, and based on climbing and sprinting points, and other minor competitions. Five riders have won three individual classifications open to all riders (general, mountains, young and points classifications) in the same race: Eddy Merckx in the 1968 Giro d'Italia and 1969 Tour de France and 1973 Vuelta a España, Tony Rominger in the 1993 Vuelta a España, Laurent Jalabert in the 1995 Vuelta a España, Marco Pantani in the 1998 Giro d'Italia, and Tadej Pogačar in the 2020 Tour de France and 2021 Tour de France.

=== Riders ===
It is rare for cyclists to ride all grand tours in the same year; in 2004, 474 cyclists started in at least one of the grand tours, 68 of them rode two Grand Tours and only two cyclists started in all three grand tours. It is not unusual for sprinters to start each of the Grand Tours and aim for stage wins before the most difficult stages occur. Alessandro Petacchi and Mark Cavendish started all three Grand Tours in 2010 and 2011, respectively, as did some of their preferred support riders. For both riders in both years, only the Tour de France was ridden to its conclusion.

Over the years, 36 riders have completed all three Grand Tours in one year: Adam Hansen did so six years in a row. The only riders to have finished in the top 10 in each of the three tours during the same year are Raphaël Géminiani in 1955 and Gastone Nencini in 1957. In 2023 Sepp Kuss became the first rider since Nencini to start and finish all three tours in one year, while winning one of them - in Kuss' case the 2023 Vuelta a España.

Riders from the same country winning all three Grand Tours in a single year has happened only on four occasions. It first occurred in 1964 with French riders Jacques Anquetil and Raymond Poulidor, with the second occurrence in 2008 with Spanish riders Alberto Contador and Carlos Sastre. 2018 marked the only time three different riders from the same country won all three Tours, these being British riders Chris Froome, Geraint Thomas and Simon Yates. In 2024 Slovenian riders Tadej Pogačar (winning the Giro and the Tour) and Primož Roglič (winning the Vuelta) repeated the accomplishments of the aforementioned French, Spanish and British riders.

== Women's Grand Tour events ==
As of 2026, no three week races currently exist on the women's road cycling circuit. Historically, women have participated in three week long stages races, with various women's Tour de France events taking place since 1984. In the contemporary UCI Women's World Tour, the Giro d'Italia Women (first held in 1988), the Tour de France Femmes (first held in 2022) and the Vuelta Femenina (started in 2015, gaining its current name in 2023) are sometimes considered to be equivalent races for women – taking place over shorter, smaller routes around a week in length. The Vuelta Femenina takes place in May, the Giro d'Italia Women is held in June and the Tour de France Femmes is held in late July / August.

Some media and teams have referred to these women's events as Grand Tours, as they are biggest and longest events on the women's calendar. However, they are not three week stage races, they do not have a special status in the rules and regulations of cycling (such as more points in the UCI Women's World Tour, or allowing an increased number of stages), and some have argued that the races need to visit high mountains (such as the Alps) or contain time trial stages to be considered an equivalent event.

Campaign groups such as Le Tour Entier and The Cyclists' Alliance continue to push organisers and the UCI to allow for longer stage races for women, as well as to improve the quality and economic stability of the women's peloton to allow for three week long races in future.

From 2026, the UCI will award more ranking points to Giro d'Italia Women, Tour de France Femmes and the Vuelta Femenina compared to other races in the UCI Women's World Tour.

== General Classification winners ==
=== By rider ===
==== Wins per year ====
Legend
Rider won 3 Grand Tours in the same year
Rider won 2 Grand Tours in the same year
Flag icon key: List of National Flags

Year	Giro d'Italia	Tour de France	Vuelta a España
1903	started in 1909	(France) Maurice Garin (1/1)	started in 1935
1904	started in 1909	(France) Henri Cornet (1/1)	started in 1935
1905	started in 1909	(France) Louis Trousselier (1/1)	started in 1935
1906	started in 1909	(France) René Pottier (1/1)	started in 1935
1907	started in 1909	(France) Lucien Petit-Breton (1/2)	started in 1935
1908	started in 1909	(France) Lucien Petit-Breton (2/2)	started in 1935
1909	(Italy) Luigi Ganna (1/1)	(Luxembourg) François Faber (1/1)	started in 1935
1910	(Italy) Carlo Galetti (1/3)	(France) Octave Lapize (1/1)	started in 1935
1911	(Italy) Carlo Galetti (2/3)	(France) Gustave Garrigou (1/1)	started in 1935
1912	(Italy) Team Atala (Carlo Galetti (3/3), Giovanni Micheletto (1/1) & Eberardo Pavesi (1/1))	(Belgium) Odile Defraye (1/1)	started in 1935
1913	(Italy) Carlo Oriani (1/1)	(Belgium) Philippe Thys (1/3)	started in 1935
1914	(Italy) Alfonso Calzolari (1/1)	(Belgium) Philippe Thys (2/3)	started in 1935
1915	Not contested during World War I		started in 1935
1916	Not contested during World War I		started in 1935
1917	Not contested during World War I		started in 1935
1918	Not contested during World War I		started in 1935
1919	(Italy) Costante Girardengo (1/2)	(Belgium) Firmin Lambot (1/2)	started in 1935
1920	(Italy) Gaetano Belloni (1/1)	(Belgium) Philippe Thys (3/3)	started in 1935
1921	(Italy) Giovanni Brunero (1/3)	(Belgium) Léon Scieur (1/1)	started in 1935
1922	(Italy) Giovanni Brunero (2/3)	(Belgium) Firmin Lambot (2/2)	started in 1935
1923	(Italy) Costante Girardengo (2/2)	(France) Henri Pélissier (1/1)	started in 1935
1924	(Italy) Giuseppe Enrici (1/1)	(Italy) Ottavio Bottecchia (1/2)	started in 1935
1925	(Italy) Alfredo Binda (1/5)	(Italy) Ottavio Bottecchia (2/2)	started in 1935
1926	(Italy) Giovanni Brunero (3/3)	(Belgium) Lucien Buysse (1/1)	started in 1935
1927	(Italy) Alfredo Binda (2/5)	(Luxembourg) Nicolas Frantz (1/2)	started in 1935
1928	(Italy) Alfredo Binda (3/5)	(Luxembourg) Nicolas Frantz (2/2)	started in 1935
1929	(Italy) Alfredo Binda (4/5)	(Belgium) Maurice De Waele (1/1)	started in 1935
1930	(Italy) Luigi Marchisio (1/1)	(France) André Leducq (1/2)	started in 1935
1931	(Italy) Francesco Camusso (1/1)	(France) Antonin Magne (1/2)	started in 1935
1932	(Italy) Antonio Pesenti (1/1)	(France) André Leducq (2/2)	started in 1935
1933	(Italy) Alfredo Binda (5/5)	(France) Georges Speicher (1/1)	started in 1935
1934	(Italy) Learco Guerra (1/1)	(France) Antonin Magne (2/2)	started in 1935
1935	(Italy) Vasco Bergamaschi (1/1)	(Belgium) Romain Maes (1/1)	(Belgium) Gustaaf Deloor (1/2)
1936	(Italy) Gino Bartali (1/5)	(Belgium) Sylvère Maes (1/2)	(Belgium) Gustaaf Deloor (2/2)
1937	(Italy) Gino Bartali (2/5)	(France) Roger Lapébie (1/1)	Not contested during the Spanish Civil War
1938	(Italy) Giovanni Valetti (1/2)	(Italy) Gino Bartali (3/5)	Not contested during the Spanish Civil War
1939	(Italy) Giovanni Valetti (2/2)	(Belgium) Sylvère Maes (2/2)	Not contested during the Spanish Civil War
1940	(Italy) Fausto Coppi (1/7)	Not contested during World War II	Not contested during the Spanish Civil War
1941	Not contested during World War II	Not contested during World War II	(Spain) Julián Berrendero (1/2)
1942	Not contested during World War II	Not contested during World War II	(Spain) Julián Berrendero (2/2)
1943	Not contested during World War II	Not contested during World War II	Not contested during World War II
1944	Not contested during World War II	Not contested during World War II	Not contested during World War II
1945	Not contested during World War II	Not contested during World War II	(Spain) Delio Rodríguez (1/1)
1946	(Italy) Gino Bartali (4/5)	Not contested during World War II	(Spain) Dalmacio Langarica (1/1)
1947	(Italy) Fausto Coppi (2/7)	(France) Jean Robic (1/1)	(Belgium) Edward Van Dijck (1/1)
1948	(Italy) Fiorenzo Magni (1/3)	(Italy) Gino Bartali (5/5)	(Spain) Bernardo Ruiz (1/1)
1949	(Italy) Fausto Coppi (3/7)	(Italy) Fausto Coppi (4/7)	Not contested
1950	(Switzerland) Hugo Koblet (1/2)	(Switzerland) Ferdinand Kübler (1/1)	(Spain) Emilio Rodríguez (1/1)
1951	(Italy) Fiorenzo Magni (2/3)	(Switzerland) Hugo Koblet (2/2)	Not contested
1952	(Italy) Fausto Coppi (5/7)	(Italy) Fausto Coppi (6/7)	Not contested
1953	(Italy) Fausto Coppi (7/7)	(France) Louison Bobet (1/3)	Not contested
1954	(Switzerland) Carlo Clerici (1/1)	(France) Louison Bobet (2/3)	Not contested
1955	(Italy) Fiorenzo Magni (3/3)	(France) Louison Bobet (3/3)	(France) Jean Dotto (1/1)
1956	(Luxembourg) Charly Gaul (1/3)	(France) Roger Walkowiak (1/1)	(Italy) Angelo Conterno (1/1)
1957	(Italy) Gastone Nencini (1/2)	(France) Jacques Anquetil (1/8)	(Spain) Jesús Loroño (1/1)
1958	(Italy) Ercole Baldini (1/1)	(Luxembourg) Charly Gaul (2/3)	(France) Jean Stablinski (1/1)
1959	(Luxembourg) Charly Gaul (3/3)	(Spain) Federico Bahamontes (1/1)	(Spain) Antonio Suárez (1/1)
1960	(France) Jacques Anquetil (2/8)	(Italy) Gastone Nencini (2/2)	(Belgium) Frans De Mulder (1/1)
1961	(Italy) Arnaldo Pambianco (1/1)	(France) Jacques Anquetil (3/8)	(Spain) Angelino Soler (1/1)
1962	(Italy) Franco Balmamion (1/2)	(France) Jacques Anquetil (4/8)	(Germany) Rudi Altig (1/1)
1963	(Italy) Franco Balmamion (2/2)	(France) Jacques Anquetil (6/8)	(France) Jacques Anquetil (5/8)
1964	(France) Jacques Anquetil (7/8)	(France) Jacques Anquetil (8/8)	(France) Raymond Poulidor (1/1)
1965	(Italy) Vittorio Adorni (1/1)	(Italy) Felice Gimondi (1/5)	(Germany) Rolf Wolfshohl (1/1)
1966	(Italy) Gianni Motta (1/1)	(France) Lucien Aimar (1/1)	(Spain) Francisco Gabica (1/1)
1967	(Italy) Felice Gimondi (2/5)	(France) Roger Pingeon (1/2)	(Netherlands) Jan Janssen (1/2)
1968	(Belgium) Eddy Merckx (1/11)	(Netherlands) Jan Janssen (2/2)	(Italy) Felice Gimondi (3/5)
1969	(Italy) Felice Gimondi (4/5)	(Belgium) Eddy Merckx (2/11)	(France) Roger Pingeon (2/2)
1970	(Belgium) Eddy Merckx (3/11)	(Belgium) Eddy Merckx (4/11)	(Spain) Luis Ocaña (1/2)
1971	(Sweden) Gösta Pettersson (1/1)	(Belgium) Eddy Merckx (5/11)	(Belgium) Ferdinand Bracke (1/1)
1972	(Belgium) Eddy Merckx (6/11)	(Belgium) Eddy Merckx (7/11)	(Spain) José Manuel Fuente (1/2)
1973	(Belgium) Eddy Merckx (9/11)	(Spain) Luis Ocaña (2/2)	(Belgium) Eddy Merckx (8/11)
1974	(Belgium) Eddy Merckx (10/11)	(Belgium) Eddy Merckx (11/11)	(Spain) José Manuel Fuente (2/2)
1975	(Italy) Fausto Bertoglio (1/1)	(France) Bernard Thévenet (1/2)	(Spain) Agustín Tamames (1/1)
1976	(Italy) Felice Gimondi (5/5)	(Belgium) Lucien Van Impe (1/1)	(Spain) José Pesarrodona (1/1)
1977	(Belgium) Michel Pollentier (1/1)	(France) Bernard Thévenet (2/2)	(Belgium) Freddy Maertens (1/1)
1978	(Belgium) Johan De Muynck (1/1)	(France) Bernard Hinault (2/10)	(France) Bernard Hinault (1/10)
1979	(Italy) Giuseppe Saronni (1/2)	(France) Bernard Hinault (3/10)	(Netherlands) Joop Zoetemelk (1/2)
1980	(France) Bernard Hinault (4/10)	(Netherlands) Joop Zoetemelk (2/2)	(Spain) Faustino Rupérez (1/1)
1981	(Italy) Giovanni Battaglin (2/2)	(France) Bernard Hinault (5/10)	(Italy) Giovanni Battaglin (1/2)
1982	(France) Bernard Hinault (6/10)	(France) Bernard Hinault (7/10)	(Spain) Marino Lejarreta (1/1)
1983	(Italy) Giuseppe Saronni (2/2)	(France) Laurent Fignon (1/3)	(France) Bernard Hinault (8/10)
1984	(Italy) Francesco Moser (1/1)	(France) Laurent Fignon (2/3)	(France) Éric Caritoux (1/1)
1985	(France) Bernard Hinault (9/10)	(France) Bernard Hinault (10/10)	(Spain) Pedro Delgado (1/3)
1986	(Italy) Roberto Visentini (1/1)	(United States) Greg LeMond (1/3)	(Spain) Álvaro Pino (1/1)
1987	(Republic of Ireland) Stephen Roche (1/2)	(Republic of Ireland) Stephen Roche (2/2)	(Colombia) Luis Herrera (1/1)
1988	(United States) Andrew Hampsten (1/1)	(Spain) Pedro Delgado (2/3)	(Republic of Ireland) Sean Kelly (1/1)
1989	(France) Laurent Fignon (3/3)	(United States) Greg LeMond (2/3)	(Spain) Pedro Delgado (3/3)
1990	(Italy) Gianni Bugno (1/1)	(United States) Greg LeMond (3/3)	(Italy) Marco Giovannetti (1/1)
1991	(Italy) Franco Chioccioli (1/1)	(Spain) Miguel Induráin (1/7)	(Spain) Melcior Mauri (1/1)
1992	(Spain) Miguel Induráin (2/7)	(Spain) Miguel Induráin (3/7)	(Switzerland) Tony Rominger (1/4)
1993	(Spain) Miguel Induráin (4/7)	(Spain) Miguel Induráin (5/7)	(Switzerland) Tony Rominger (2/4)
1994	(Russia) Eugeni Berzin (1/1)	(Spain) Miguel Induráin (6/7)	(Switzerland) Tony Rominger (3/4)
1995	(Switzerland) Tony Rominger (4/4)	(Spain) Miguel Induráin (7/7)	(France) Laurent Jalabert (1/1)
1996	(Russia) Pavel Tonkov (1/1)	(Denmark) Bjarne Riis (1/1)	(Switzerland) Alex Zülle (1/2)
1997	(Italy) Ivan Gotti (1/2)	(Germany) Jan Ullrich (1/2)	(Switzerland) Alex Zülle (2/2)
1998	(Italy) Marco Pantani (1/2)	(Italy) Marco Pantani (2/2)	(Spain) Abraham Olano (1/1)
1999	(Italy) Ivan Gotti (2/2)	No winner^{[A]}	(Germany) Jan Ullrich (2/2)
2000	(Italy) Stefano Garzelli (1/1)	No winner^{[A]}	(Spain) Roberto Heras (1/4)
2001	(Italy) Gilberto Simoni (1/2)	No winner^{[A]}	(Spain) Ángel Casero (1/1)
2002	(Italy) Paolo Savoldelli (1/2)	No winner^{[A]}	(Spain) Aitor González (1/1)
2003	(Italy) Gilberto Simoni (2/2)	No winner^{[A]}	(Spain) Roberto Heras (2/4)
2004	(Italy) Damiano Cunego (1/1)	No winner^{[A]}	(Spain) Roberto Heras (3/4)
2005	(Italy) Paolo Savoldelli (2/2)	No winner^{[A]}	(Spain) Roberto Heras (4/4)
2006	(Italy) Ivan Basso (1/2)	(Spain) Óscar Pereiro (1/1)	(Kazakhstan) Alexander Vinokourov (1/1)
2007	(Italy) Danilo Di Luca (1/1)	(Spain) Alberto Contador (1/7)	(Russia) Denis Menchov (1/2)
2008	(Spain) Alberto Contador (2/7)	(Spain) Carlos Sastre (1/1)	(Spain) Alberto Contador (3/7)
2009	(Russia) Denis Menchov (2/2)	(Spain) Alberto Contador (4/7)	(Spain) Alejandro Valverde (1/1)
2010	(Italy) Ivan Basso (2/2)	(Luxembourg) Andy Schleck (1/1)	(Italy) Vincenzo Nibali (1/4)
2011	(Italy) Michele Scarponi (1/1)	(Australia) Cadel Evans (1/1)	(United Kingdom) Chris Froome (1/7)
2012	(Canada) Ryder Hesjedal (1/1)	(United Kingdom) Bradley Wiggins (1/1)	(Spain) Alberto Contador (5/7)
2013	(Italy) Vincenzo Nibali (2/4)	(United Kingdom) Chris Froome (2/7)	(United States) Chris Horner (1/1)
2014	(Colombia) Nairo Quintana (1/2)	(Italy) Vincenzo Nibali (3/4)	(Spain) Alberto Contador (6/7)
2015	(Spain) Alberto Contador (7/7)	(United Kingdom) Chris Froome (3/7)	(Italy) Fabio Aru (1/1)
2016	(Italy) Vincenzo Nibali (4/4)	(United Kingdom) Chris Froome (4/7)	(Colombia) Nairo Quintana (2/2)
2017	(Netherlands) Tom Dumoulin (1/1)	(United Kingdom) Chris Froome (5/7)	(United Kingdom) Chris Froome (6/7)
2018	(United Kingdom) Chris Froome (7/7)	(United Kingdom) Geraint Thomas (1/1)	(United Kingdom) Simon Yates (1/2)
2019	(Ecuador) Richard Carapaz (1/1)	(Colombia) Egan Bernal (1/2)	(Slovenia) Primož Roglič (1/5)
2020	(United Kingdom) Tao Geoghegan Hart (1/1)	(Slovenia) Tadej Pogačar (1/6)	(Slovenia) Primož Roglič (2/5)
2021	(Colombia) Egan Bernal (2/2)	(Slovenia) Tadej Pogačar (2/6)	(Slovenia) Primož Roglič (3/5)
2022	(Australia) Jai Hindley (1/1)	(Denmark) Jonas Vingegaard (1/4)	(Belgium) Remco Evenepoel (1/1)
2023	(Slovenia) Primož Roglič (4/5)	(Denmark) Jonas Vingegaard (2/4)	(United States) Sepp Kuss (1/1)
2024	(Slovenia) Tadej Pogačar (3/6)	(Slovenia) Tadej Pogačar (4/6)	(Slovenia) Primož Roglič (5/5)
2025	(United Kingdom) Simon Yates (2/2)	(Slovenia) Tadej Pogačar (5/6)	(Denmark) Jonas Vingegaard (3/4)
2026	(Denmark) Jonas Vingegaard (4/4)	(Slovenia) Tadej Pogačar (6/6)	(Spain) Enric Mas (1/1)

A. ^{a} ^{b} ^{c} ^{d} ^{e} ^{f} ^{g} Lance Armstrong was declared the winner of seven consecutive Tours from 1999 to 2005. However, on 22 October 2012, he was stripped of all his titles by the UCI for his use of performance-enhancing drugs. The organizers of the Tour de France announced that the winner's slot would remain empty in the record books, rather than transfer the win to the second-place finishers each year.

==== Wins per rider ====
The following table shows the riders with the most Grand Tour wins.

Rank	Rider	Total	Giro	Tour	Vuelta
1	(Belgium) Eddy Merckx	11	5 (1968, 1970, 1972, 1973, 1974)	5 (1969, 1970, 1971, 1972, 1974)	1 (1973)
2	(France) Bernard Hinault	10	3 (1980, 1982, 1985)	5 (1978, 1979, 1981, 1982, 1985)	2 (1978, 1983)
3	(France) Jacques Anquetil	8	2 (1960, 1964)	5 (1957, 1961, 1962, 1963, 1964)	1 (1963)
4	(Italy) Fausto Coppi	7	5 (1940, 1947, 1949, 1952, 1953)	2 (1949, 1952)	–
4	(Spain) Miguel Indurain	7	2 (1992, 1993)	5 (1991, 1992, 1993, 1994, 1995)	–
4	(Spain) Alberto Contador	7	2 (2008, 2015)	2 (2007, 2009)	3 (2008, 2012, 2014)
4	(United Kingdom) Chris Froome	7	1 (2018)	4 (2013, 2015, 2016, 2017)	2 (2011, 2017)
8	**(Slovenia) Tadej Pogačar**	6	1 (2024)	5 (2020, 2021, 2024, 2025, 2026)	–
9	(Italy) Alfredo Binda	5	5 (1925, 1927, 1928, 1929, 1933)	–	
9	(Italy) Gino Bartali	5	3 (1936, 1937, 1946)	2 (1938, 1948)	–
9	(Italy) Felice Gimondi	5	3 (1967, 1969, 1976)	1 (1965)	1 (1968)
9	**(Slovenia) Primož Roglič**	5	1 (2023)	–	4 (2019, 2020, 2021, 2024)

- Active riders marked in bold.

==== Winners of all three Grand Tours ====
Eight cyclists have won all three of the Grand Tours during their career:

Rider	Total	Giro	Tour	Vuelta
(Belgium) Eddy Merckx	11	5 (1968, 1970, 1972, 1973, 1974)	5 (1969, 1970, 1971, 1972, 1974)	1 (1973)
(France) Bernard Hinault	10	3 (1980, 1982, 1985)	5 (1978, 1979, 1981, 1982, 1985)	2 (1978, 1983)
(France) Jacques Anquetil	8	2 (1960, 1964)	5 (1957, 1961, 1962, 1963, 1964)	1 (1963)
(Spain) Alberto Contador	7	2 (2008, 2015)	2 (2007, 2009)	3 (2008, 2012, 2014)
(United Kingdom) Chris Froome	7	1 (2018)	4 (2013, 2015, 2016, 2017)	2 (2011, 2017)
(Italy) Felice Gimondi	5	3 (1967, 1969, 1976)	1 (1965)	1 (1968)
(Italy) Vincenzo Nibali	4	2 (2013, 2016)	1 (2014)	1 (2010)
(Denmark) Jonas Vingegaard	4	1 (2026)	2 (2022, 2023)	1 (2025)

Hinault and Contador are the only cyclists to have won each Grand Tour at least twice.

==== Winners of three or more consecutive Grand Tours ====
- (Belgium) Eddy Merckx: 4 Grand Tours – Giro (1972), Tour (1972), Vuelta (1973), Giro (1973)
- (France) Bernard Hinault: 3 Grand Tours – Giro (1982), Tour (1982), Vuelta (1983).
- (United Kingdom) Chris Froome: 3 Grand Tours – Tour (2017), Vuelta (2017), Giro (2018).

Additionally, Fausto Coppi won the 1952 Giro d'Italia, the 1952 Tour de France and the 1953 Giro d'Italia, with the Vuelta a España not held in 1952.

==== Winners of multiple Grand Tours in a single year ====
No rider has won all three Grand Tours in a single year in any classification (general, points, mountain, young rider). Few riders have even finished all three in a single year; of those who have, two finished in the top ten in each: Raphaël Géminiani (4th, 6th and 3rd in the Giro, Tour and Vuelta in 1955) and Gastone Nencini (1st, 6th and 9th in 1957).

Eleven riders have achieved a double by winning two grand tours in the same calendar year.

Giro d'Italia and Tour de France
1949	(Italy) Fausto Coppi
1952	(Italy) Fausto Coppi
1964	(France) Jacques Anquetil
1970	(Belgium) Eddy Merckx
1972	(Belgium) Eddy Merckx
1974	(Belgium) Eddy Merckx
1982	(France) Bernard Hinault
1985	(France) Bernard Hinault
1987	(Republic of Ireland) Stephen Roche
1992	(Spain) Miguel Induráin
1993	(Spain) Miguel Induráin
1998	(Italy) Marco Pantani
2024	(Slovenia) Tadej Pogacar

Tour de France and Vuelta a España
1963	(France) Jacques Anquetil
1978	(France) Bernard Hinault
2017	(United Kingdom) Chris Froome

Giro d'Italia and Vuelta a España
1973	(Belgium) Eddy Merckx
1981	(Italy) Giovanni Battaglin
2008	(Spain) Alberto Contador

Of the above eleven, Pantani, Roche and Battaglin's doubles were their only Grand Tour victories in their careers.

Merckx, Roche and Pogacar also won the men's road race at the World Championship in the same year as their Giro-Tour double to complete the Triple Crown of Cycling.

==== Smallest margin between 1st and 2nd placed rider ====
The margins between the winner of a Grand Tour and the runner-up are often narrow, and rarely larger than a few minutes.

As of 2021, there have been 54 Grand Tours with a winning margin less than one minute. The smallest margins are as follows:

Rank	Winner	Time	Runner-up	Margin	Race
1	(France) Éric Caritoux	90h 08' 03""	(Spain) Alberto Fernández	+00h 00' 06"	Vuelta a España (1984)
2	(United States) Greg LeMond	87h 38' 35"	(France) Laurent Fignon	+00h 00' 08"	Tour de France (1989)
3	(Spain) José Manuel Fuente	86h 48' 18"	(Portugal) Joaquim Agostinho	+00h 00' 11"	Vuelta a España (1974)
3	(Italy) Fiorenzo Magni	124h 51' 52"	(Italy) Ezio Cecchi	+00h 00' 11"	Giro d'Italia (1948)
5	(Belgium) Eddy Merckx	113h 08' 13"	(Italy) Gianbattista Baronchelli	+00h 00' 12"	Giro d'Italia (1974)
6	(Italy) Angelo Conterno	105h 37' 52"	(Spain) Jesús Loroño	+00h 00' 13"	Vuelta a España (1956)
6	(Italy) Fiorenzo Magni	108h 56' 12"	(Italy) Fausto Coppi	+00h 00' 13"	Giro d'Italia (1955)
8	(Spain) Augustín Tamames	88h 00" 56'	(Spain) Domingo Perurena	+00h 00' 14"	Vuelta a España (1975)
8	(Slovenia) Primož Roglič	85h 29" 02'	(United Kingdom) Geraint Thomas	+00h 00' 14"	Giro d'Italia (2023)
10	(Canada) Ryder Hesjedal	91h 39' 02"	(Spain) Joaquim Rodríguez	+00h 00' 16"	Giro d'Italia (2012)

The biggest winning margin in a Grand Tour was 2h 59' 21" in Maurice Garin's win at the first Tour de France in 1903. The biggest margin in the history of Giro d'Italia was in 1914 when Alfonso Calzolari won by 1h 57' 26", and the biggest margin in the history of Vuelta a España was in 1945 when Delio Rodríguez finished 30' 08" clear.

==== Days leading classification ====
In previous tours, sometimes a stage was broken in two (or three). "Days" column gives the number of times the cyclist was a classification leader at the end of the day. Numbers in brackets include split stages.

after the end of 2026 Vuelta a España

Legend
Current records
Rider was leading in all Grand Tours

Rank	Rider	Days	Leading span	Giro	Tour	Vuelta
1	(Belgium) Eddy Merckx	**182** ^{(200)}	1968–1975	**76** ^{(78)}	**97** ^{(111)}	**9** ^{(11)}
2	(France) Bernard Hinault	**121** ^{(125)}	1978–1986	**31**	**75** ^{(79)}	**15**
3	(France) Jacques Anquetil	**108** ^{(110)}	1957–1967	**42**	**51** ^{(52)}	**15** ^{(16)}
4	(Slovenia) Tadej Pogačar	**97**	2020–2026	**20**	**70**	**7**
5	(Spain) Miguel Induráin	**93**	1985–1995	**29**	**60**	**4**
6	(United Kingdom) Chris Froome	**89**	2011–2018	**3**	**59**	**27**
7	(Switzerland) Alex Zülle	**64**	1992–2000	**12**	**4**	**48**
8	(Italy) Francesco Moser	**63** ^{(66)}	1975–1985	**50** ^{(52)}	**6** ^{(7)}	**7**
9	(Italy) Gino Bartali	**62** ^{(73)}	1936–1949	**42** ^{(50)}	**20** ^{(23)}	0
9	(Slovenia) Primož Roglič	**62**	2019–2025	**9**	**11**	**42**

Sixteen other cyclists have led the overall standings in all three Grand Tours during their careers. No rider has done so in a single season.

Tadej Pogačar amassed most Grand Tour days at the top of the classification in a single calendar year - 39 in 2024.

=== By country ===
Grand Tour general classification wins by country
Rank	Country	Total	Giro	Tour	Vuelta	First win	Latest win
1	Italy	85	69	10	6	1909	2016
2	France	51	6	36	9	1903	1995
3	Spain	49	4	12	33	1941	2026
4	Belgium	33	7	18	8	1912	2022
5	Great Britain	12	3	6	3	2011	2025
6	Slovenia	11	2	5	4	2019	2026
7	Switzerland	10	3	2	5	1950	1997
8	Luxembourg	7	2	5	0	1909	2010
9	United States	6	1	3	2	1986	2023
10	Netherlands	5	1	2	2	1967	2017
10	Colombia	5	2	1	2	1987	2021
10	Denmark	5	1	3	1	1996	2026
13	Germany	4	0	1	3	1962	1999
13	Russia	4	3	0	1	1994	2009
15	Ireland	3	1	1	1	1987	1988
16	Australia	2	1	1	0	2011	2022
17	Sweden	1	1	0	0	1971	
17	Kazakhstan	1	0	0	1	2006	
17	Canada	1	1	0	0	2012	
17	Ecuador	1	1	0	0	2019	

==== All three wins in the same year by one country ====
Year	Country	Giro	Tour	Vuelta
1964	France	(France) Jacques Anquetil	(France) Jacques Anquetil	(France) Raymond Poulidor
2008	Spain	(Spain) Alberto Contador	(Spain) Carlos Sastre	(Spain) Alberto Contador
2018	Great Britain	(United Kingdom) Chris Froome	(United Kingdom) Geraint Thomas	(United Kingdom) Simon Yates
2024	Slovenia	(Slovenia) Tadej Pogačar	(Slovenia) Tadej Pogačar	(Slovenia) Primož Roglič

==== All three wins in the same year by a home rider ====
Year	Giro	Tour	Vuelta
1957	(Italy) Gastone Nencini	(France) Jacques Anquetil	(Spain) Jesús Loroño
1961	(Italy) Arnaldo Pambianco	(France) Jacques Anquetil	(Spain) Angelino Soler
1966	(Italy) Gianni Motta	(France) Lucien Aimar	(Spain) Francisco Gabica
1975	(Italy) Fausto Bertoglio	(France) Bernard Thévenet	(Spain) Agustín Tamames

=== All three wins in the same year by one team ===
Year	Team	Giro	Tour	Vuelta
2023	Team Jumbo–Visma	(Slovenia) Primož Roglič	(Denmark) Jonas Vingegaard	(United States) Sepp Kuss

== Points classification winners ==
The Tour/Giro/Vuelta triple has been achieved by six riders – Djamolidine Abdoujaparov, Mark Cavendish, Laurent Jalabert, Eddy Merckx, Mads Pedersen and Alessandro Petacchi.

Rank	Rider	Total	Giro	Tour	Vuelta
1	(Germany) Erik Zabel	9	0	6 (1996, 1997, 1998, 1999, 2000, 2001)	3 (2002, 2003, 2004)
2	(Republic of Ireland) Sean Kelly	8	0	4 (1982, 1983, 1985, 1989)	4 (1980, 1985, 1986, 1988)
2	(Slovakia) Peter Sagan	8	1 (2021)	7 (2012, 2013, 2014, 2015, 2016, 2018, 2019)	0
4	(France) Laurent Jalabert	7	1 (1999)	2 (1992, 1995)	4 (1994, 1995, 1996, 1997)
5	(Belgium) Eddy Merckx	6	2 (1968, 1973)	3 (1969, 1971, 1972)	1 (1973)

== Mountains classification winners ==
The Tour/Giro/Vuelta triple has been achieved by two riders – Federico Bahamontes and Luis Herrera.

Rank	Rider	Total	Giro	Tour	Vuelta
1	(Italy) Gino Bartali	9	7 (1935, 1936, 1937, 1939, 1940, 1946, 1947)	2 (1938, 1948)	0
1	(Spain) Federico Bahamontes	9	1 (1956)	6 (1954, 1958, 1959, 1962, 1963, 1964)	2 (1957, 1958)
3	(Belgium) Lucien Van Impe	8	2 (1982, 1983)	6 (1971, 1972, 1975, 1977, 1981, 1983)	0
4	(France) Richard Virenque	7	0	7 (1994, 1995, 1996, 1997, 1999, 2003, 2004)	0
5	(Spain) Julio Jiménez	6	0	3 (1965, 1966, 1967)	3 (1963, 1964, 1965)

== Young rider classification winners ==
The Tour/Giro double has been achieved by three riders – Egan Bernal, Nairo Quintana and Andy Schleck. The Giro/Vuelta double has been achieved by one rider – Miguel Ángel López. The Tour/Vuelta double has been achieved by two riders – Tadej Pogačar and Remco Evenepoel.

Rank	Rider	Total	Giro	Tour	Vuelta
1	(Slovenia) Tadej Pogačar	5	0	4 (2020, 2021, 2022, 2023)	1 (2019)
2	(Luxembourg) Andy Schleck	4	1 (2007)	3 (2008, 2009, 2010)	0
3	(Germany) Jan Ullrich	3	0	3 (1996, 1997, 1998)	0
3	(Colombia) Nairo Quintana	3	1 (2014)	2 (2013, 2015)	0
3	(Colombia) Miguel Ángel López	3	2 (2018, 2019)	0	1 (2017)

== General, Points and Mountain classifications winners in the same event in the same year ==
Eddy Merckx 1968 Giro d'Italia and 1969 Tour de France.

Tony Rominger 1993 Vuelta a Espana.

Laurent Jalabert 1995 Vuelta a Espana.

Eddy Merckx was the only rider that had the limit age that time to win the Young Riders Classification in those events, but it had not been introduced yet.

== Grand Tour stage wins ==
=== Stage wins by rider ===
Three cyclists have won stages in all three of the Grand Tours in the same season: Miguel Poblet in 1956, Pierino Baffi in 1958 and Alessandro Petacchi in 2003. The rider with the most Grand Tour stage wins in one season is Freddy Maertens who won 20 stages in 1977: 13 in the Vuelta a España and 7 in the Giro d'Italia.

Cyclists whose names are in bold are still active.
This list is complete up to and including the 2026 Tour de France.

Rank	Rider	Total	Giro	Tour	Vuelta	Years
1	(Belgium) Eddy Merckx	64	24 ^{a}	34	6	1967–1975
2	(Italy) Mario Cipollini	57	42	12	3	1989–2003
3	(United Kingdom) Mark Cavendish	55	17	35	3	2008–2024
4	(Italy) Alessandro Petacchi	48	22	6	20	2000–2011
5	(Italy) Alfredo Binda	43	41	2	0	1925–1933
6	(France) Bernard Hinault	41	6	28	7	1978–1986
7	(Italy) Learco Guerra	39	31	8	0	1930–1937
7	(Spain) Delio Rodríguez	39	0	0	39	1941–1947
9	(Slovenia) **Tadej Pogačar**	38	6	26	6	2019–2026
10	(Belgium) Rik Van Looy	37	12	7	18	1958–1969
11	(Belgium) Freddy Maertens	35	7	15	13	1976–1981
12	(Italy) Fausto Coppi	31	22	9	0	1940–1955
13	(Italy) Costante Girardengo	30	30	0	0	1913–1926
14	(Italy) Gino Bartali	29	17	12	0	1935–1950
15	(Italy) Marino Basso	27	15	6	6	1966–1977
15	(Italy) Francesco Moser	27	23	2	2	1973–1986
17	(Italy) Raffaele Di Paco	26	15	11	0	1930–1938
17	(Spain) Miguel Poblet	26	20	3	3	1955–1961
17	(Italy) Giuseppe Saronni	26	24	0	2	1978–1985
20	(Italy) Franco Bitossi	25	21	4	0	1964–1975
20	(Italy) Guido Bontempi	25	16	5 ^{b}	4	1981–1993
20	(France) Laurent Jalabert	25	3	4	18	1992–2001
20	(France) André Leducq	25	0	25	0	1927–1938
20	(Belgium) Rik Van Steenbergen	25	15	4	6	1949–1957
25	(Belgium) Roger De Vlaeminck	24	22	1	1	1970–1984
25	(Australia) Robbie McEwen	24	12	12	0	1999–2007
27	(France) Jacques Anquetil	23	6	16	1	1957–1964
27	(France) André Darrigade	23	1	22	0	1953–1964
29	(Germany) André Greipel	22	7	11	4	2008–2017
29	(Slovenia) **Primož Roglič**	22	4	3	15	2016–2024
29	(Netherlands) Jean Paul van Poppel	22	4	9	9	1986–1994
32	(Luxembourg) Charly Gaul	21	11	10	0	1955–1961
32	(Netherlands) Gerben Karstens	21	1	6	14	1965–1976
32	(Republic of Ireland) Sean Kelly	21	0	5	16	1978–1988
32	(Switzerland) Tony Rominger	21	5	3	13	1988–1996
36	(France) Jean Alavoine	20	3	17	0	1909–1923
36	(Luxembourg) Nicolas Frantz	20	0	20	0	1924–1929
36	(Italy) Giuseppe Olmo	20	20	0	0	1933–1937
36	(Germany) Erik Zabel	20	0	12	8	1995–2007
40	(France) François Faber	19	0	19	0	1908–1914
40	(Germany) Marcel Kittel	19	4	14	1	2011–2017
40	(Belgium) Patrick Sercu	19	13	6	0	1970–1977
43	(Germany) Rudi Altig	18	4	8	6	1962–1969
43	(Italy) Nino Defilippis	18	9	7	2	1952–1964
43	(Italy) Adolfo Leoni	18	17	1	0	1938–1951
43	(Slovakia) Peter Sagan	18	2	12	4	2011–2021
47	(Uzbekistan) Djamolidine Abdoujaparov	17	1	9	7	1991–1996
47	(Spain) Alejandro Valverde	17	1	4	12	2003–2019
47	(Belgium) **Jasper Philipsen**	17	0	11	6	2020–2026
50	(Switzerland) Urs Freuler	16	15	1	0	1981–1989
50	(Spain) Miguel Induráin	16	4	12	0	1989–1995
50	(France) René Le Grevès	16	0	16	0	1933–1939
50	(Italy) Fiorenzo Magni	16	6	7	3	1948–1955
50	(Italy) Marco Pantani	16	8	8	0	1994–2000
50	(France) Charles Pélissier	16	0	16	0	1929–1935
50	(Belgium) Wout van Aert	16	1	10	5	2019–2026

^{a} Not counting the two-man team time trial Prologue win in 1973 Giro.

^{b} Not counting the TTT/ITT combined format Preface win in 1988 Tour.

=== Stage wins by country ===
Before 1958, all Grand Tour stage winners had come from just 10 European countries: France, Luxembourg, Italy, Belgium, Spain, Austria, Germany, Netherlands, Switzerland and Portugal. By 1973 the list of countries had expanded by just four more countries, all European (Great Britain, Ireland, Denmark and Sweden), to a total of 14. As of 2025, riders representing 42 countries from all populated continents have won stages in Grand Tours.

- Englishman Brian Robinson became the first non-continental Grand Tour stage winner winning Stage 7 of the 1958 Tour de France, after Italian Arigo Padovan who crossed the line first was relegated for sprinting irregularities.
- Dane Ole Ritter became the first Scandinavian stage winner when he won the 45km (28mi) long Stage 16 ITT in the 1967 Giro. A year later he broke the hour record in Mexico.
- Colombian Martín Emilio Rodríguez was the first Grand Tour stage winner from the Americas when in the flat Stage 15 of the 1973 Giro he attacked with 4km to go to beat the chasing peloton by 3 seconds.
- Australian Donald Allan became the first Grand Tour stage winner from Oceania in an upset win of Stage 17 of the 1975 Vuelta in a bunch sprint in front of thousands of fans in a finish in a Bilbao football stadium.
- South African Alan Van Heerden became the first African to win a Grand Tour stage winning Stage 7 of the 1979 Giro in a sprint win among a small breakaway. Van Heerden rode in the pro peloton 1979-1980 despite South Africans being banned from cycling from 1976 due to apartheid.
- Greg LeMond of the United States became the first North American to win a Grand Tour stage when he won the penultimate Stage 20 46km long ITT of the 1985 Tour de France, beating teammate Bernard Hinault by 5 seconds. Hinault won that Tour overall by 1'42" with LeMond second, LeMond won the 1986 Tour by 3'10" with Hinault second.

=== Number of Grand Tour stage wins by country and by first year won ===
Country	#	1st yr.
Italy	1766	1909
France	928	1903
Belgium	918	1909
Spain	812	1929
Netherlands	345	1936
Germany	204	1932
Switzerland	152	1936
Great Britain	150	1958
Australia	113	1975
Colombia	94	1973
Luxembourg	88	1908
Denmark	86	1967
Slovenia	65	2009
Ireland	54	1960
United States	53	1985
Russia	49	1993
Norway	38	1975
Portugal	31	1945
Slovakia	24	1994
Poland	17	1986
Czech Republic	16	2000
Uzbekistan	15	1992
Ukraine	15	1993
Kazakhstan	14	2000
Soviet Union	13	1985
Sweden	12	1972
Ecuador	11	2018
Austria	10	1931
Estonia	8	1998
Canada	8	1988
Mexico	7	1989
Belarus	6	2008
South Africa	6	1979
Venezuela	5	1990
East Germany	4	1990
Latvia	4	1993
Lithuania	4	2006
Eritrea	4	2022
Argentina	3	2007
New Zealand	2	1980
Brazil	1	1991
Costa Rica	1	2012

Stage wins by country by year detailed table
Year	(Italy)	(France)	(Belgium)	(Spain)	(Netherlands)	(Germany)	(Switzerland)	(United Kingdom)	(Australia)	(Colombia)	(Luxembourg)	(Denmark)	(Slovenia)	(Republic of Ireland)	(United States)	(Russia)	(Norway)	(Portugal)	(Slovakia)	(Poland)	(Czech Republic)	(Uzbekistan)	(Ukraine)	(Kazakhstan)	(Soviet Union)	(Sweden)	(Ecuador)	(Austria)	(Estonia)	(Canada)	(Belarus)	(South Africa)	(Mexico)	(Venezuela)	(East Germany)	(Latvia)	(Lithuania)	(Eritrea)	(Argentina)	(New Zealand)	(Brazil)	(Costa Rica)
**1903**	-	5	-	-	-	-	1	-	-	-	-	-	-	-	-	-	-	-	-	-	-	-	-	-	-	-	-	-	-	-	-	-	-	-	-	-	-	-	-	-	-	-
1904	-	5	-	-	-	-	1	-	-	-	-	-	-	-	-	-	-	-	-	-	-	-	-	-	-	-	-	-	-	-	-	-	-	-	-	-	-	-	-	-	-	-
1905	-	11	-	-	-	-	-	-	-	-	-	-	-	-	-	-	-	-	-	-	-	-	-	-	-	-	-	-	-	-	-	-	-	-	-	-	-	-	-	-	-	-
1906	-	13	-	-	-	-	-	-	-	-	-	-	-	-	-	-	-	-	-	-	-	-	-	-	-	-	-	-	-	-	-	-	-	-	-	-	-	-	-	-	-	-
1907	-	15	-	-	-	-	-	-	-	-	-	-	-	-	-	-	-	-	-	-	-	-	-	-	-	-	-	-	-	-	-	-	-	-	-	-	-	-	-	-	-	-
1908	-	10	-	-	-	-	-	-	-	-	4	-	-	-	-	-	-	-	-	-	-	-	-	-	-	-	-	-	-	-	-	-	-	-	-	-	-	-	-	-	-	-
**1909**	8	7	1	-	-	-	-	-	-	-	6	-	-	-	-	-	-	-	-	-	-	-	-	-	-	-	-	-	-	-	-	-	-	-	-	-	-	-	-	-	-	-
1910	10	12	-	-	-	-	-	-	-	-	3	-	-	-	-	-	-	-	-	-	-	-	-	-	-	-	-	-	-	-	-	-	-	-	-	-	-	-	-	-	-	-
1911	11	12	1	-	-	-	-	-	-	-	2	-	-	-	-	-	-	-	-	-	-	-	-	-	-	-	-	-	-	-	-	-	-	-	-	-	-	-	-	-	-	-
1912	10	8	5	-	-	-	-	-	-	-	-	-	-	-	-	-	-	-	-	-	-	-	-	-	-	-	-	-	-	-	-	-	-	-	-	-	-	-	-	-	-	-
1913	10	2	10	-	-	-	-	-	-	-	2	-	-	-	-	-	-	-	-	-	-	-	-	-	-	-	-	-	-	-	-	-	-	-	-	-	-	-	-	-	-	-
1914	8	7	4	-	-	-	2	-	-	-	2	-	-	-	-	-	-	-	-	-	-	-	-	-	-	-	-	-	-	-	-	-	-	-	-	-	-	-	-	-	-	-
1919	11	11	2	-	-	-	1	-	-	-	-	-	-	-	-	-	-	-	-	-	-	-	-	-	-	-	-	-	-	-	-	-	-	-	-	-	-	-	-	-	-	-
1920	12	6	13	-	-	-	-	-	-	-	-	-	-	-	-	-	-	-	-	-	-	-	-	-	-	-	-	-	-	-	-	-	-	-	-	-	-	-	-	-	-	-
1921	11	5	9	-	-	-	-	-	-	-	-	-	-	-	-	-	-	-	-	-	-	-	-	-	-	-	-	-	-	-	-	-	-	-	-	-	-	-	-	-	-	-
1922	11	6	8	-	-	-	-	-	-	-	-	-	-	-	-	-	-	-	-	-	-	-	-	-	-	-	-	-	-	-	-	-	-	-	-	-	-	-	-	-	-	-
1923	11	12	2	-	-	-	-	-	-	-	-	-	-	-	-	-	-	-	-	-	-	-	-	-	-	-	-	-	-	-	-	-	-	-	-	-	-	-	-	-	-	-
1924	17	4	5	-	-	-	-	-	-	-	2	-	-	-	-	-	-	-	-	-	-	-	-	-	-	-	-	-	-	-	-	-	-	-	-	-	-	-	-	-	-	-
1925	17	1	8	-	-	-	-	-	-	-	4	-	-	-	-	-	-	-	-	-	-	-	-	-	-	-	-	-	-	-	-	-	-	-	-	-	-	-	-	-	-	-
1926	13	-	12	-	-	-	-	-	-	-	4	-	-	-	-	-	-	-	-	-	-	-	-	-	-	-	-	-	-	-	-	-	-	-	-	-	-	-	-	-	-	-
1927	15	6	15	-	-	-	-	-	-	-	3	-	-	-	-	-	-	-	-	-	-	-	-	-	-	-	-	-	-	-	-	-	-	-	-	-	-	-	-	-	-	-
1928	12	13	4	-	-	-	-	-	-	-	5	-	-	-	-	-	-	-	-	-	-	-	-	-	-	-	-	-	-	-	-	-	-	-	-	-	-	-	-	-	-	-
1929	14	10	9	1	-	-	-	-	-	-	2	-	-	-	-	-	-	-	-	-	-	-	-	-	-	-	-	-	-	-	-	-	-	-	-	-	-	-	-	-	-	-
1930	20	13	3	-	-	-	-	-	-	-	-	-	-	-	-	-	-	-	-	-	-	-	-	-	-	-	-	-	-	-	-	-	-	-	-	-	-	-	-	-	-	-
1931	19	8	6	-	-	-	-	-	-	-	-	-	-	-	-	-	-	-	-	-	-	-	-	-	-	-	-	3	-	-	-	-	-	-	-	-	-	-	-	-	-	-
1932	19	7	6	-	-	2	-	-	-	-	-	-	-	-	-	-	-	-	-	-	-	-	-	-	-	-	-	-	-	-	-	-	-	-	-	-	-	-	-	-	-	-
1933	19	10	11	-	-	-	-	-	-	-	-	-	-	-	-	-	-	-	-	-	-	-	-	-	-	-	-	-	-	-	-	-	-	-	-	-	-	-	-	-	-	-
1934	19	21	2	-	-	-	-	-	-	-	-	-	-	-	-	-	-	-	-	-	-	-	-	-	-	-	-	-	-	-	-	-	-	-	-	-	-	-	-	-	-	-
**1935**	25	15	15	4	-	-	-	-	-	-	-	-	-	-	-	-	-	-	-	-	-	-	-	-	-	-	-	2	-	-	-	-	-	-	-	-	-	-	-	-	-	-
1936	23	13	17	12	1	-	1	-	-	-	2	-	-	-	-	-	-	-	-	-	-	-	-	-	-	-	-	-	-	-	-	-	-	-	-	-	-	-	-	-	-	-
1937	26	9	10	2	-	4	3	-	-	-	1	-	-	-	-	-	-	-	-	-	-	-	-	-	-	-	-	-	-	-	-	-	-	-	-	-	-	-	-	-	-	-
1938	25	8	12	-	3	1	1	-	-	-	1	-	-	-	-	-	-	-	-	-	-	-	-	-	-	-	-	-	-	-	-	-	-	-	-	-	-	-	-	-	-	-
1939	19	17	7	-	1	-	1	-	-	-	2	-	-	-	-	-	-	-	-	-	-	-	-	-	-	-	-	-	-	-	-	-	-	-	-	-	-	-	-	-	-	-
1940	20	-	-	-	-	-	-	-	-	-	-	-	-	-	-	-	-	-	-	-	-	-	-	-	-	-	-	-	-	-	-	-	-	-	-	-	-	-	-	-	-	-
1941	-	-	-	22	-	-	-	-	-	-	-	-	-	-	-	-	-	-	-	-	-	-	-	-	-	-	-	-	-	-	-	-	-	-	-	-	-	-	-	-	-	-
1942	3	4	-	13	-	-	-	-	-	-	-	-	-	-	-	-	-	-	-	-	-	-	-	-	-	-	-	-	-	-	-	-	-	-	-	-	-	-	-	-	-	-
1945	-	-	-	17	-	-	-	-	-	-	-	-	-	-	-	-	-	2	-	-	-	-	-	-	-	-	-	-	-	-	-	-	-	-	-	-	-	-	-	-	-	-
1946	19	-	-	20	2	-	-	-	-	-	-	-	-	-	-	-	-	1	-	-	-	-	-	-	-	-	-	-	-	-	-	-	-	-	-	-	-	-	-	-	-	-
1947	30	12	4	17	-	-	3	-	-	-	-	-	-	-	-	-	-	-	-	-	-	-	-	-	-	-	-	-	-	-	-	-	-	-	-	-	-	-	-	-	-	-
1948	30	6	9	16	-	-	-	-	-	-	-	-	-	-	-	-	-	-	-	-	-	-	-	-	-	-	-	-	-	-	-	-	-	-	-	-	-	-	-	-	-	-
1949	25	8	5	-	-	-	1	-	-	-	1	-	-	-	-	-	-	-	-	-	-	-	-	-	-	-	-	-	-	-	-	-	-	-	-	-	-	-	-	-	-	-
1950	26	9	5	17	-	-	6	-	-	-	2	-	-	-	-	-	-	-	-	-	-	-	-	-	-	-	-	-	-	-	-	-	-	-	-	-	-	-	-	-	-	-
1951	20	7	6	2	1	-	7	-	-	-	1	-	-	-	-	-	-	-	-	-	-	-	-	-	-	-	-	-	-	-	-	-	-	-	-	-	-	-	-	-	-	-
1952	22	9	7	-	2	-	2	-	-	-	1	-	-	-	-	-	-	-	-	-	-	-	-	-	-	-	-	-	-	-	-	-	-	-	-	-	-	-	-	-	-	-
1953	21	10	2	1	6	-	3	-	-	-	-	-	-	-	-	-	-	-	-	-	-	-	-	-	-	-	-	-	-	-	-	-	-	-	-	-	-	-	-	-	-	-
1954	12	15	9	-	5	-	6	-	-	-	-	-	-	-	-	-	-	-	-	-	-	-	-	-	-	-	-	-	-	-	-	-	-	-	-	-	-	-	-	-	-	-
1955	29	12	3	7	4	-	1	-	-	-	3	-	-	-	-	-	-	-	-	-	-	-	-	-	-	-	-	-	-	-	-	-	-	-	-	-	-	-	-	-	-	-
1956	22	13	10	10	2	-	1	-	-	-	6	-	-	-	-	-	-	-	-	-	-	-	-	-	-	-	-	-	-	-	-	-	-	-	-	-	-	-	-	-	-	-
1957	16	22	9	11	1	-	-	-	-	-	2	-	-	-	-	-	-	-	-	-	-	-	-	-	-	-	-	-	-	-	-	-	-	-	-	-	-	-	-	-	-	-
1958	21	12	11	12	1	-	-	1	-	-	5	-	-	-	-	-	-	-	-	-	-	-	-	-	-	-	-	-	-	-	-	-	-	-	-	-	-	-	-	-	-	-
1959	13	18	9	13	-	-	3	1	-	-	4	-	-	-	-	-	-	1	-	-	-	-	-	-	-	-	-	-	-	-	-	-	-	-	-	-	-	-	-	-	-	-
1960	14	14	18	14	-	-	2	-	-	-	1	-	-	1	-	-	-	-	-	-	-	-	-	-	-	-	-	-	-	-	-	-	-	-	-	-	-	-	-	-	-	-
1961	11	16	16	13	1	-	-	-	-	-	2	-	-	-	-	-	-	1	-	-	-	-	-	-	-	-	-	-	-	-	-	-	-	-	-	-	-	-	-	-	-	-
1962	18	15	12	7	3	6	-	-	-	-	-	-	-	1	-	-	-	-	-	-	-	-	-	-	-	-	-	-	-	-	-	-	-	-	-	-	-	-	-	-	-	-
1963	21	11	16	9	2	-	-	-	-	-	-	-	-	2	-	-	-	-	-	-	-	-	-	-	-	-	-	-	-	-	-	-	-	-	-	-	-	-	-	-	-	-
1964	16	10	16	13	6	2	1	2	-	-	-	-	-	-	-	-	-	-	-	-	-	-	-	-	-	-	-	-	-	-	-	-	-	-	-	-	-	-	-	-	-	-
1965	25	6	17	11	4	1	1	1	-	-	-	-	-	-	-	-	-	-	-	-	-	-	-	-	-	-	-	-	-	-	-	-	-	-	-	-	-	-	-	-	-	-
1966	24	2	8	14	14	5	-	1	-	-	1	-	-	-	-	-	-	-	-	-	-	-	-	-	-	-	-	-	-	-	-	-	-	-	-	-	-	-	-	-	-	-
1967	12	11	15	10	10	4	1	4	-	-	-	1	-	-	-	-	-	-	-	-	-	-	-	-	-	-	-	-	-	-	-	-	-	-	-	-	-	-	-	-	-	-
1968	15	11	19	13	4	3	-	3	-	-	-	-	-	-	-	-	-	-	-	-	-	-	-	-	-	-	-	-	-	-	-	-	-	-	-	-	-	-	-	-	-	-
1969	23	5	22	12	-	1	-	4	-	-	-	1	-	-	-	-	-	2	-	-	-	-	-	-	-	-	-	-	-	-	-	-	-	-	-	-	-	-	-	-	-	-
1970	19	6	27	11	5	1	-	-	-	-	1	1	-	-	-	-	-	-	-	-	-	-	-	-	-	-	-	-	-	-	-	-	-	-	-	-	-	-	-	-	-	-
1971	19	6	21	10	10	-	-	-	-	-	-	1	-	-	-	-	-	-	-	-	-	-	-	-	-	-	-	-	-	-	-	-	-	-	-	-	-	-	-	-	-	-
1972	10	7	27	15	9	-	-	-	-	-	-	-	-	-	-	-	-	-	-	-	-	-	-	-	-	1	-	-	-	-	-	-	-	-	-	-	-	-	-	-	-	-
1973	5	8	34	12	7	-	-	3	-	1	-	-	-	-	-	-	-	1	-	-	-	-	-	-	-	-	-	-	-	-	-	-	-	-	-	-	-	-	-	-	-	-
1974	11	9	30	17	3	-	-	1	-	-	-	-	-	-	-	-	-	2	-	-	-	-	-	-	-	-	-	-	-	-	-	-	-	-	-	-	-	-	-	-	-	-
1975	18	3	26	13	6	-	-	1	1	1	-	-	-	-	-	-	1	-	-	-	-	-	-	-	-	-	-	-	-	-	-	-	-	-	-	-	-	-	-	-	-	-
1976	13	3	30	7	12	5	-	-	-	-	1	-	-	-	-	-	-	1	-	-	-	-	-	-	-	-	-	-	-	-	-	-	-	-	-	-	-	-	-	-	-	-
1977	17	9	30	5	7	6	-	-	-	-	-	-	-	-	-	-	1	-	-	-	-	-	-	-	-	-	-	-	-	-	-	-	-	-	-	-	-	-	-	-	-	-
1978	17	12	15	7	12	3	-	-	-	-	-	-	-	1	-	-	-	-	-	-	-	-	-	-	-	-	-	-	-	-	-	-	-	-	-	-	-	-	-	-	-	-
1979	13	11	17	6	12	1	1	-	-	-	-	-	-	2	-	-	1	1	-	-	-	-	-	-	-	2	-	-	-	-	-	1	-	-	-	-	-	-	-	-	-	-
1980	20	11	6	8	12	2	-	-	-	-	-	1	-	7	-	-	-	-	-	-	-	-	-	-	-	1	-	-	-	-	-	-	-	-	-	-	-	-	-	1	-	-
1981	22	9	10	13	9	-	3	-	-	-	-	1	-	1	-	-	3	-	-	-	-	-	-	-	-	-	-	-	-	-	-	-	-	-	-	-	-	-	-	-	-	-
1982	11	14	13	12	6	-	7	-	2	-	-	-	-	1	-	-	-	-	-	-	-	-	-	-	-	1	-	-	-	-	-	-	-	-	-	-	-	-	-	-	-	-
1983	20	14	8	13	5	1	2	1	1	-	-	1	-	-	-	-	-	-	-	-	-	-	-	-	-	1	-	-	-	-	-	-	-	-	-	-	-	-	-	-	-	-
1984	15	16	17	7	1	1	6	1	-	1	-	-	-	-	-	-	2	1	-	-	-	-	-	-	-	-	-	-	-	-	-	-	-	-	-	-	-	-	-	-	-	-
1985	14	7	10	10	5	-	5	-	-	6	-	1	-	4	3	-	-	2	-	-	-	-	-	-	1	-	-	-	-	-	-	-	-	-	-	-	-	-	-	-	-	-
1986	14	12	8	15	4	1	3	1	-	-	-	-	-	3	3	-	1	2	-	1	-	-	-	-	1	-	-	-	-	-	-	-	-	-	-	-	-	-	-	-	-	-
1987	17	12	4	15	9	1	1	1	-	4	-	-	-	5	2	-	1	1	-	-	-	-	-	-	-	-	-	-	-	-	-	-	-	-	-	-	-	-	-	-	-	-
1988	15	5	-	11	15	2	3	3	-	2	-	2	-	2	2	-	-	1	-	1	-	-	-	-	-	-	-	-	-	1	-	-	-	-	-	-	-	-	-	-	-	-
1989	10	5	4	8	12	2	5	3	1	3	-	3	-	1	3	-	-	2	-	3	-	-	-	-	1	-	-	-	-	-	-	-	1	-	-	-	-	-	-	-	-	-
1990	19	9	4	10	7	1	-	-	2	3	-	1	-	-	-	-	1	-	-	-	-	-	-	-	3	-	-	-	-	-	-	-	1	1	4	-	-	-	-	-	-	-
1991	24	7	1	12	7	1	-	1	1	2	-	2	-	-	-	-	-	-	-	-	-	-	-	-	7	-	-	-	-	-	-	-	-	-	-	-	-	-	-	-	1	-
1992	20	8	5	11	8	2	3	1	-	2	-	-	-	1	1	-	-	-	-	-	-	4	-	-	-	-	-	-	-	-	-	-	-	-	-	-	-	-	-	-	-	-
1993	20	3	2	9	2	1	9	-	-	2	-	3	-	-	1	2	1	-	-	1	-	6	1	-	-	-	-	-	-	-	-	-	-	-	-	1	-	-	-	-	-	-
1994	20	12	-	4	3	-	7	2	-	2	-	3	-	-	-	3	-	-	4	-	-	3	1	-	-	-	-	-	-	-	-	-	-	-	-	2	-	-	-	-	-	-
1995	21	8	1	6	2	7	8	1	-	1	-	2	-	-	1	2	-	-	1	-	-	1	2	-	-	-	-	-	-	-	-	-	-	-	-	-	-	-	-	-	-	-
1996	27	7	2	1	4	3	8	-	-	2	-	4	-	-	-	4	-	-	-	-	-	1	2	-	-	1	-	-	-	-	-	-	-	-	-	-	-	-	-	-	-	-
1997	21	9	-	7	4	9	1	1	1	1	-	1	-	-	-	6	-	-	-	-	3	-	1	-	-	1	-	-	-	-	-	-	-	-	-	-	-	-	-	-	-	-
1998	26	2	4	7	4	6	6	1	1	-	-	-	-	-	-	4	-	-	-	-	1	-	1	-	-	2	-	-	1	-	-	-	-	-	-	-	-	-	-	-	-	-
1999	22	5	6	9	3	6	1	-	1	1	-	-	-	-	-	2	-	-	-	-	-	-	2	-	-	-	-	-	1	-	-	1	-	-	-	1	-	-	-	-	-	-
2000	25	2	3	14	5	2	1	1	1	3	-	-	-	-	-	2	-	-	-	-	3	-	-	1	-	-	-	-	-	-	-	-	-	-	-	-	-	-	-	-	-	-
2001	17	4	4	9	1	9	1	2	-	4	-	1	-	-	1	1	-	-	-	-	2	-	-	-	-	-	-	-	1	-	-	1	1	-	-	-	-	-	-	-	-	-
2002	21	2	1	15	2	1	1	1	5	3	-	-	-	-	1	2	1	-	-	-	-	-	-	-	-	-	-	-	1	-	-	-	2	-	-	-	-	-	-	-	-	-
2003	27	2	-	14	1	3	-	2	4	1	-	2	-	-	2	-	1	-	-	-	-	-	1	1	-	-	-	-	-	-	-	-	-	1	-	-	-	-	-	-	-	-
2004	23	3	2	13	-	-	1	-	5	1	-	-	-	-	3	2	1	-	-	-	-	-	1	-	-	-	-	-	1	-	-	-	-	-	-	-	-	-	-	-	-	-
2005	20	2	2	12	2	1	-	-	7	2	-	2	-	-	2	2	1	-	-	-	-	-	-	2	-	-	-	1	-	-	-	-	-	1	-	-	-	-	-	-	-	-
2006	12	3	1	12	-	8	-	1	6	1	1	1	-	-	-	1	3	1	-	-	-	-	3	4	-	-	-	-	-	-	-	-	-	-	-	-	1	-	-	-	-	-
2007	22	2	3	9	-	5	2	-	3	3	1	2	-	-	1	2	3	-	-	-	-	-	-	-	-	-	-	-	-	-	-	1	-	-	-	-	-	-	2	-	-	-
2008	19	5	5	13	-	3	1	6	1	-	1	1	-	-	3	2	2	-	-	-	-	-	-	-	-	-	-	-	-	-	1	-	-	-	-	-	-	-	-	-	-	-
2009	8	6	1	7	1	7	3	10	2	-	1	1	1	1	1	4	2	-	-	-	-	-	-	1	-	-	-	-	-	1	1	-	-	-	-	-	1	-	-	1	-	-
2010	10	9	3	8	-	1	3	9	3	-	2	1	-	-	5	1	2	1	1	-	-	-	-	1	-	1	-	-	-	-	1	-	-	-	-	-	-	-	-	-	-	-
2011	8	3	3	11	2	5	1	9	2	-	2	-	-	1	2	-	4	1	3	-	-	-	-	-	-	-	-	-	1	-	1	-	-	2	-	-	-	-	1	-	-	-
2012	8	5	3	14	-	8	1	11	2	1	-	1	-	-	2	1	-	-	3	-	1	-	-	-	-	1	-	-	-	-	-	-	-	-	-	-	-	-	-	-	-	1
2013	9	5	2	4	1	7	1	12	5	2	-	1	-	2	2	1	-	2	1	-	2	-	-	1	-	-	-	-	-	-	1	-	-	-	-	-	1	-	-	-	-	-
2014	15	7	-	5	2	14	-	-	7	5	-	-	1	-	-	-	2	-	-	3	-	-	-	-	-	-	-	-	-	1	-	-	-	-	-	-	1	-	-	-	-	-
2015	12	4	5	10	4	8	1	3	4	2	1	-	1	1	1	1	-	1	1	1	1	-	-	-	-	-	-	-	-	-	1	-	-	-	-	-	-	-	-	-	-	-
2016	8	4	7	4	4	9	1	11	1	3	1	2	1	-	-	3	-	-	3	-	-	-	-	-	-	-	-	-	1	-	-	-	-	-	-	-	-	-	-	-	-	-
2017	7	8	3	4	5	6	1	3	3	8	1	-	3	-	2	-	1	-	1	4	-	-	-	1	-	-	-	2	-	-	-	-	-	-	-	-	-	-	-	-	-	-
2018	9	8	2	6	4	2	1	8	4	4	-	1	2	4	2	-	1	-	3	-	-	-	-	-	-	-	1	-	-	1	-	-	-	-	-	-	-	-	-	-	-	-
2019	8	6	5	6	5	3	-	2	5	5	-	1	6	2	2	1	-	-	1	-	-	-	-	1	-	-	2	-	-	-	-	1	-	-	-	-	-	-	-	-	-	-
2020	6	8	5	2	-	3	1	4	4	2	-	3	9	4	-	-	1	1	1	1	1	-	-	1	-	-	2	-	-	1	-	-	-	-	-	-	-	-	-	-	-	-
2021	8	5	9	-	6	1	2	5	5	3	-	3	9	1	2	-	-	-	1	1	-	-	-	-	-	-	-	1	1	-	-	-	-	-	-	-	-	-	-	-	-	-
2022	5	4	10	2	7	1	-	4	6	3	1	7	4	2	-	-	-	-	-	-	1	-	-	-	-	-	3	-	-	1	-	1	-	-	-	-	-	1	-	-	-	-
2023	6	3	10	4	3	4	-	2	6	3	-	8	6	1	2	-	-	2	-	1	-	-	-	-	-	-	-	1	-	1	-	-	-	-	-	-	-	-	-	-	-	-
2024	5	6	11	5	2	1	1	2	4	-	-	1	15	2	1	-	-	-	-	-	1	-	-	-	-	-	2	-	-	1	-	-	-	-	-	-	-	3	-	-	-	-
2025	5	3	10	5	7	1	-	3	7	1	-	9	4	1	-	-	1	1	-	-	-	-	-	-	-	-	1	-	-	-	-	-	1	-	-	-	-	-	-	-	-	-
**TOTAL**	**1766**	**928**	**917**	**812**	**342**	**204**	**152**	**150**	**113**	**94**	**88**	**77**	**62**	**54**	**53**	**49**	**38**	**31**	**24**	**17**	**16**	**15**	**15**	**14**	**13**	**12**	**11**	**10**	**8**	**8**	**6**	**6**	**6**	**5**	**4**	**4**	**4**	**4**	**3**	**2**	**1**	**1**
	(Italy)	(France)	(Belgium)	(Spain)	(Netherlands)	(Germany)	(Switzerland)	(United Kingdom)	(Australia)	(Colombia)	(Luxembourg)	(Denmark)	(Slovenia)	(Republic of Ireland)	(United States)	(Russia)	(Norway)	(Portugal)	(Slovakia)	(Poland)	(Czech Republic)	(Uzbekistan)	(Ukraine)	(Kazakhstan)	(Soviet Union)	(Sweden)	(Ecuador)	(Austria)	(Estonia)	(Canada)	(Belarus)	(South Africa)	(Mexico)	(Venezuela)	(East Germany)	(Latvia)	(Lithuania)	(Eritrea)	(Argentina)	(New Zealand)	(Brazil)	(Costa Rica)

== Grand Tour finishers ==
The rider who has finished most Grand Tours is Matteo Tosatto, with 28 across 20 years (12 Tours, 11 Giros and 5 Vueltas, 1997-2016). Tosatto also has the most participations with 34 (12 Tours, 13 Giros and 9 Vueltas). Nelson Oliveira has finished the most consecutive Grand Tours: 24 tours from 2011 Vuelta a España till 2026 Tour de France.

Only 36 riders have finished all three Grand Tours in one season. Adam Hansen has done this six times consecutively. Marino Lejarreta completed every grand tour of the season for the 4th time in 1991. His record of 4 was not passed until Adam Hansen completed the Vuelta in 2016. Bernardo Ruiz was the first rider to ride every tour of a season on three occasions which he completed in 1957. Both Eduardo Chozas and Carlos Sastre have accomplished the feat twice.

Gastone Nencini (1957) and Sepp Kuss (2023) are the only cyclists to both ride all three Grand Tours and win one in the same season. The best average finish was in the first year three Grand Tours were finished in one season, 1955, when Raphaël Géminiani finished 4th, 6th and 3rd in the Giro, Tour and Vuelta, respectively. Nencini's 1st, 6th and 9th is the only other time a rider has finished top 10 in all 3 Grand Tours in a year. In Marino Lejarreta's 4 years that he rode 12 Grand Tours, he finished in the top 10 in eight of them including top 5 five times.

=== Riders finishing all three Grand Tours in a season ===
Rider	Year	Final GC position		
Rider	Year	Giro	Tour	Vuelta
Sepp Kuss (2)	2026	13	13	5
(United States) Sepp Kuss	2023	14	12	1
(Belgium) Thomas De Gendt	2019	51	60	56
(Australia) Adam Hansen (6)	2017	93	113	95
(Spain) Alejandro Valverde	2016	3	6	12
(Australia) Adam Hansen (5)	2016	68	100	110
(France) Sylvain Chavanel	2015	36	54	47
(Australia) Adam Hansen (4)	2015	77	114	55
(Australia) Adam Hansen (3)	2014	73	64	53
(Australia) Adam Hansen (2)	2013	72	72	60
(Australia) Adam Hansen	2012	94	81	123
(Germany) Sebastian Lang	2011	56	113	77
(Spain) Carlos Sastre (2)	2010	8	20	8
(New Zealand) Julian Dean	2009	136	121	132
(Italy) Marzio Bruseghin	2008	3	27	10
(Germany) Erik Zabel	2008	80	43	49
(Belgium) Mario Aerts	2007	20	70	28
(Spain) Carlos Sastre	2006	43	4	4
(Italy) Giovanni Lombardi	2005	88	118	114
(Spain) Jon Odriozola	2001	58	69	83
(Italy) Mariano Piccoli	1999	38	50	58
(Italy) Guido Bontempi	1992	40	75	62
(Australia) Neil Stephens	1992	57	74	66
(Spain) Eduardo Chozas (2)	1991	10	11	11
(Italy) Marco Giovannetti	1991	8	30	18
(Spain) Marino Lejarreta (4)	1991	5	53	3
(Spain) Inaki Gaston	1991	23	61	14
(Spain) Alberto Leanizbarrutia	1991	64	39	44
(Soviet Union) Vladimir Poulnikov	1991	11	88	66
(Italy) Valerio Tebaldi	1991	47	89	87
(Spain) Eduardo Chozas	1990	11	6	33
(Spain) Marino Lejarreta (3)	1990	7	5	55
(Spain) Marino Lejarreta (2)	1989	10	5	20
(Spain) Luis Javier Lukin	1988	32	82	60
(Spain) Marino Lejarreta	1987	4	10	34
(France) Philippe Poissonnier	1985	86	90	66
(Spain) José Luis Uribezubia	1971	29	50	27
(Spain) Jose Manuel Fuente	1971	39	72	54
(Spain) Federico Bahamontes	1958	17	8	6
(Italy) Pierino Baffi	1958	23	63	37
(Italy) Mario Baroni	1957	74	53	46
(Italy) Gastone Nencini	1957	1	6	9
(Spain) Bernardo Ruiz (3)	1957	55	24	3
(Italy) Arrigo Padovan	1956	12	26	19
(Spain) Bernardo Ruiz (2)	1956	38	70	31
(Spain) José Serra	1956	26	81	9
(France) Raphaël Géminiani	1955	4	6	3
(Spain) Bernardo Ruiz	1955	28	22	14
(France) Louis Caput	1955	68	54	55

== See also ==
- List of Grand Tour general classification winners
