= Kenny Van Der Schueren =

Belgian cyclist

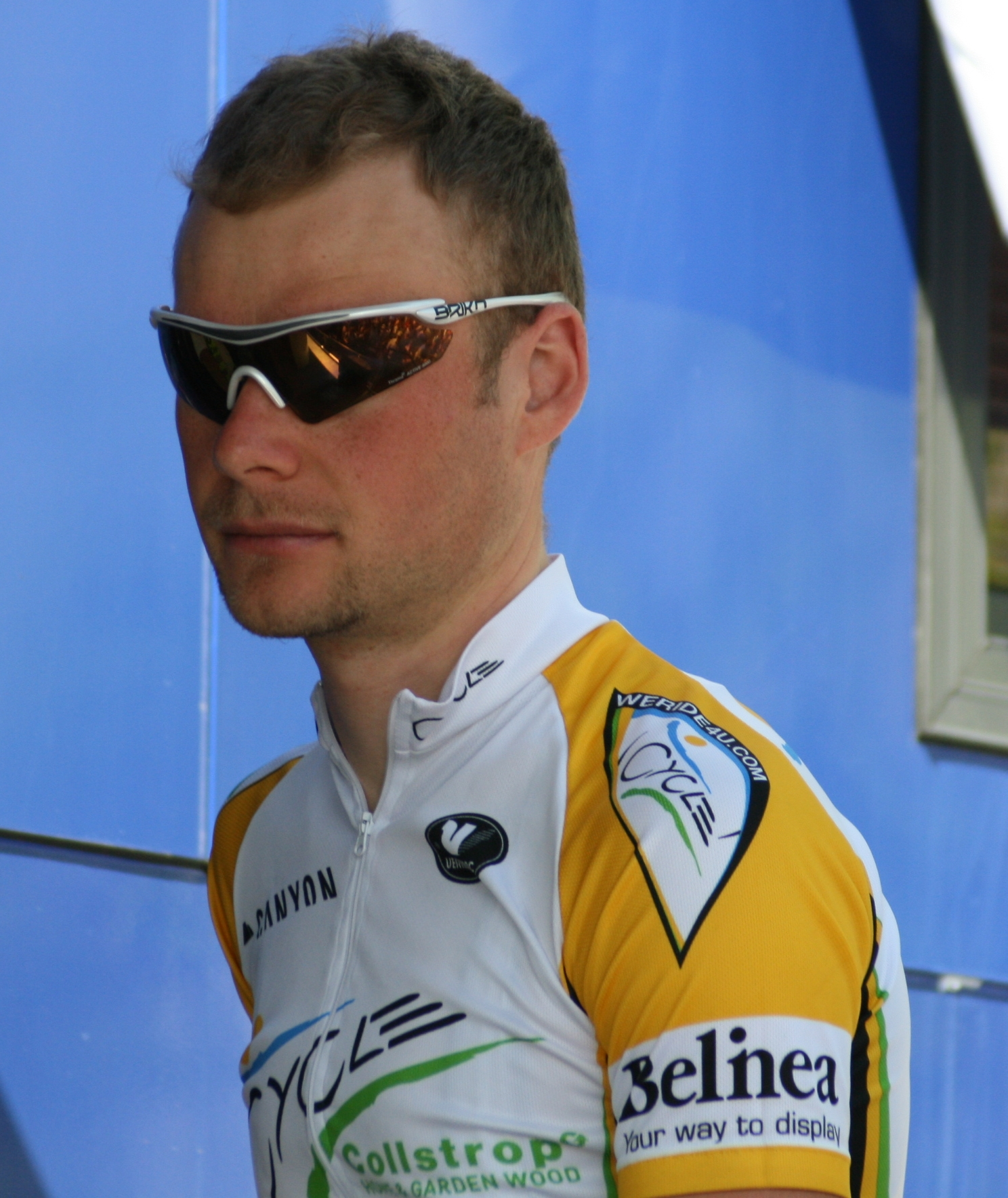

Personal information
- Born: 20 July 1982 (age 44) Zottegem, Belgium

Cycling career
- Sport: Cycling
- Current team: Retired
- Discipline: Road
- Role: Rider

Professional teams
- 2004: Jartazi Granville Team
- 2006: Profel Ziegler Continental Team
- 2007–2008: Unibet.com
- 2009: Palmans Cras
- 2011–2012: Team Worldofbike.Gr

Kenny Van Der Schueren (born 20 July 1982 in Zottegem) is a Belgian former road cyclist.

== Major results ==
2007
1st Triptyque Ardennais
2nd Kattekoers
4th De Vlaamse Pijl
