= Gil Suray =

Belgian cyclist

Personal information
- Full name: Gil Suray
- Born: 29 August 1984 (age 42) Anderlecht, Belgium

Cycling career
- Sport: Cycling
- Discipline: Road
- Role: Rider

Amateur team
- 2005: MrBookmaker.com-SportsTech (trainee)

Professional teams
- 2007–2008: Cycle Collstrop
- 2009: Roubaix-Lille Metropole
- 2010: An Post–Sean Kelly
- 2011: Lotto-Bodysol

Gil Suray (born 29 August 1984 in Anderlecht) is a Belgian professional road bicycle racer, who last rode for UCI Continental team Lotto-Bodysol.

In 2011, he was racing for T.Palm-Pôle Continental Wallon when he came third in Hoeilaart. With his experience, he acted as team captain in races when the team couldn't communicate with the sport director via earpieces.

== Performances ==
Flèche Ardennaise (2006)
