= Cycle Collstrop =

Team information
- UCI code: COS
- Registered: Netherlands
- Founded: 2001
- Disbanded: 2008
- Discipline: Road
- Status: Professional Continental (2004–2006, 2008); UCI ProTour (2007)

Key personnel
- General manager: Koen Terryn
- Team manager: Jacques Hanegraaf

Team name history
- 2004 2005 2006–2007 2008: MrBookmaker.com – Palmans; MrBookmaker – Sports Tech; Unibet.com; Cycle Collstrop
Jersey

Cycle Collstrop (UCI team code: COS) was a Swedish UCI Professional Continental cycling team. It was the successor to Unibet.com, which was mainly sponsored by the online gambling website Unibet.com and as a continuation of the MrBookmaker.com cycling team.

The team rode on the European Continental Circuit, until the beginning of the 2007 season, when they were granted a ProTour licence. In 2008, they were awarded a Professional Continental licence. The new team was led by Steffen Wesemann, and problems previously experienced through having had sponsorship from a betting company were avoided with new sponsorship from a wooden flooring company.

Unibet.com had also been drawn into the Operación Puerto doping investigation. The cyclist Carlos Quesada was named by the Spanish authorities as a patient of Dr. Eufemiano Fuentes and was suspended by the team. Although Quesada had been named, he has not yet been formally charged with doping, which led to the management of Unibet.com to lift its suspension of Quesada two weeks after it was imposed. Nevertheless, the team did not pay the Spanish cyclist his salary, which led to a lawsuit, finally resolved with Quesada leaving the team in exchange for a compensation.

The team, whose sponsors have pulled out of cycling, failed to submit its application for renewal by the 20 November 2007 deadline and did not take part in the 2008 UCI ProTour. Many of the team members went to the newly formed team Vacansoleil.

== Dispute with race organisers ==
Despite obtaining a ProTour license for the 2007 season, Unibet.com were not granted entry in Paris–Nice, the inaugural race of the series. The organiser of the French race, Amaury Sport Organisation, argued that French law bans gambling companies (except for Française des Jeux and PMU, as well as some casinos). Nevertheless, Unibet.com took part in the French races GP La Marseillaise and Étoile de Bessèges with special jerseys without their sponsor's name.

RCS also snubbed Unibet.com for the Tirreno–Adriatico, explaining that Italian gambling law required a special license for Unibet. However, as the Unibet.com management pointed out, Unibet did have the license, while Predictor-Lotto's sponsor (the Belgian national lottery) did not, but the Belgian squad was allowed to race on Italian soil. RCS further contradicted themselves when they later invited Unibet.com to Milan–San Remo in which Jeremy Hunt was their best rider, finishing in 17th place, ahead of former winners such as Filippo Pozzato or Paolo Bettini.

However, Unibet.com was not chosen to ride in any of the three Grand Tours.

== Major wins ==
2007
Nationale Sluitingsprijs (Gorik Gardeyn)
Grand Prix d'Ouverture La Marseillaise, (Jeremy Hunt)
Stage 3, Tour Down Under (Baden Cooke)
Le Samyn, (Jimmy Casper)
General classification, Record Driedaagse van West-Vlaanderen, (Jimmy Casper)
Points classification, Record Driedaagse van West-Vlaanderen, (Jimmy Casper)
Stage 1, Record Driedaagse van West-Vlaanderen, (Jimmy Casper)
General classification, Tour of Ireland, ((Stijn Vandenbergh))
Mountains classification, Volta a Catalunya (Luis Pasamontes)
Stage 8, Tour de Suisse (Rigoberto Urán)

== Final roster ==
Name	Birthdate	Nationality	Team 2007	Team 2009
Borut Božič	8. August 1980	Slovenia	Team L.P.R.	Vacansoleil
Tom Criel	6. June 1983	Belgium	Unibet.com	Topsport Vlaanderen
Bas Giling	4. November 1982	Netherlands	Wiesenhof–Felt	Team Designa Køkken
Michał Gołaś	29. April 1984	Poland	Unibet.com	Amica Chips-Knauf
Sergey Kolesnikov	3. September 1986	Russia	Unibet.com	Moscow
David Kopp	5. January 1979	Germany	Team Gerolsteiner	Elite 2
Sergey Lagutin	14. January 1981	Uzbekistan	Navigators Insurance Cycling Team	Vacansoleil
Marco Marcato	11. February 1984	Italy	Team L.P.R.	Vacansoleil
Lucas Persson	16. March 1984	Sweden	Unibet.com Continental	Team Capinordic
Matthé Pronk	1. July 1974	Netherlands	Unibet.com	Vacansoleil
Sergey Rudaskov	6. August 1984	Russia	Neo-pro	Elite 2
Mirko Selvaggi	11. February 1985	Italy	Neo-pro	Amica Chips-Knauf
Raynold Smith	20. November 1985	South Africa	Ex-Pro (Fondas Imabo 2005)	Elite 2
Gil Suray	29. August 1984	Belgium	Unibet.com	Roubaix – Lille Metropole
Kenny Van Der Schueren	20. July 1982	Belgium	Unibet.com Continental	Palmans-Cras
Troels Vinther	24. February 1987	Denmark	Unibet.com	Team Capinordic
Steffen Wesemann	11. March 1971	Switzerland	Wiesenhof–Felt	Retired
