= Mutignano =

- Frazione
- Interactive map of Mutignano
- Coordinates: 42°35′16″N 14°02′06″E
- Country: Italy
- Region: Abruzzo
- Province: Teramo
- Communes of Italy: Pineto
- Elevation: 1,053 ft (321 m)

Population (2001)
  - Total: 560
- Time zone: UTC+1 (CET)
  - Summer (DST): UTC+2 (CEST)

Mutignano is a frazione of Pineto in the Province of Teramo in the Abruzzo region of Italy. Pineto's other frazioni include Borgo Santa Maria Immaculata, Colle Morino, Croce Ferretti, Scerne, Torre Cerrano, and Torre San Rocco.

Until 1930, Mutignano was the administrative center for the Pineto area. Mutignano predates the establishment of the commune of Pineto by over 1000 years. Mutignano sits on a hill overlooking the Adriatic Sea with the Gran Sasso Mountains in the background.

== History ==
Mutignano was, for long time bound to the adjacent and more important locale of Atri. The village by 958 already appears on its face to be a consolidated settlement. The assets were subject to the diocese of Penne, subject to the abbey of San Giovanni de Venere (in Fossacesia), and by 1140, 48 families count themselves as residents. By 1193, the village nearly doubled in population. On April 1, 1251 Mutignano is transferred to the new diocese of Atri.

According to an old traditional history, taken from the writings of Atrian humanist Luigi Illuminati in the 14th century, Slavic immigration came to Mutignano. According to Illuminatati, the presence of the Slavs were said to have originated from ancient Ragusa, today Dubrovnik, and not only have left traces in the physical appearance of the residents and in the religion of the patron saint S. Ilario, but also in the local dialect, bringing characteristic details not rediscovered elsewhere in the regions. It appears nevertheless more likely than the arrival of people from the opposite coast of Adriatic—not only the Slavs but also Albanians—occurred in the first half of the fifteenth century, in a period of a still not intense but significant flow of Balkan populations that was interested the territories of the adriatic Mezzogiorno. As confirmation of this supposition, in the Atrian land registry of 1447 in the part reported for Mutignano, there appears among the proprietors of the residences, a Nardi Andreas (alias Albanian) and a Damiano (alias duraczino, that is to say originally of Durazzo (today Durrës, the second largest city of Albania)).

Rapid is the development, and the progressively greater importance of Mutignano in this fertile farmland region, that in the 17th century there arrives the Consiglio of Atri and until, March 14, 1729, when Mutignano obtains the separation and later on, in 1809, the establishment of an autonomous parish. In the second half of the nineteenth century Mutignano, now for some time an autonomous commune, reached over 2 thousand residents. But with the opening of the (Adriatic Line) railroad station in the lower coastal area, there was the strong growth of Villa Filiani, the original nucleus of present-day Pineto. The railway throughout the Adriatic coast (especially in Teramo and Pescara) reversed the centuries-old importance of the hilltowns and the relationship to their coasts. Thus Pineto grew in importance at the expense of Mutignano; similarly as Silvi Marina grew in importance over Silvi Alta; Montesilvano Marina grew over Montesilavno Colle, etc. On May 30, 1930, it was decreed that the transfer of the municipal seat to the village of Pineto was official, while Mutignano took on the role of frazione of the Town of Pineto.

== Origin of the name ==
The origin of the name, Mutignano, has been the subject of several theories.

According to one theory, the name of the town, is derived from Mutini Fanum, which would reference to the remote and lasting presence of a religion – and therefore of a relevant temple – in honor of the forest of Priapo, god of the gardens and agriculture. Others suggest the place name would instead interpreted as Mutini-Janus, tied therefore to a double religion, that of the aforementioned Priapo and also of Janus. And there are those who proposed Mons-tignarus as the origin, evoking thus a hill of rich timber (woods).

According to the research of Ernesto Giammarco, Mutignano more correctly would derive its name from the Roman personality Mutius, transformed then into Mut (t) inius. In the course of the numerous centuries preceding today, and often very different theories between them, are other relevant names to Mutignano history: in the Catalogus Baronum, relevant to the years 1150-1168, the village stronghold appears with the name of Mitiguianum, while Mitignano is the name that identifies it in 1275 and in 1322. Two years later we have Miteneano or Mateniano, while Mitignano is the name that appears in an act of September 27, 1462, when Ferdinand I of Naples (Ferrante I of Aragon) returns the village stronghold to the Priest Giulio Antonio Acquaviva. Then there is Metignano in 1482 and Mutignani in 1502, when the village comes under Andrea Matteo III Acquaviva d' Aragon; then Miliniano in 1530 and Muttignano in 1574, a name that in the course of the 16th century often is alternated as Miliziano. The name Mutignano finally seems to affirm itself from 1602, even though in a document of 1689 there appears the different name of Montediano.

== Culture and attractions ==
Mutignano is home to the church of San Silvestro Papa, a medieval building from about 1350 that has since been restored. It has a single nave and a bell tower on the entrance facade. Above the altar is a triptych by the Abruzzese Renaissance painter Andrea Delitio, who also worked in the Cathedral of Santa Maria Assunta in Atri. Its central panel shows Pope Sylvester, with two of his miracles on the left and a theological dispute and the baptism of the emperor Constantine on the right. The painting reflects Delitio's ties to the Florentine style.

Along Il Corso Umberto I, folk artists have created large wall murals (murales) depicting town life at work and at home.

Further along Corso Umberto I is the medieval church of Saint Anthony (Sant'Antonio). It has been restored and is now used for concerts and public events because of its acoustics.

At the end of the Corso, high above the seaside resort of Pineto, is the Castellano, a park at the highest point in Mutignano. It looks east over the Adriatic coast and west to the Gran Sasso mountains, and is shaded by trees and open to the breeze.

Surrounding the town are geological features called calanchi. These are erosion furrows cut into the subsoils of the rich farmland.

At the base of one of the hillside roads from Mutignano (and at the border between Pineto and Silvi Marina) is the Tower of Cerrano (Torre di Cerrano) built in the 16th century when Abruzzo was part of the Kingdom of Naples as an early warning system for attacks by Turks from the Dalmatian coast (present day Croatia).

Torre di Cerrano is not only a tower that protected the Kingdom of Naples, but a place where Roman history hides. Hatria, an ancient Roman city, was built in the present city of Atri. The harbor of Hatria was built in front of the Tower, and the ruins of this ancient harbor are buried under the Adriatic Sea.
