= Pineto =

- Comune
- Comune di Pineto
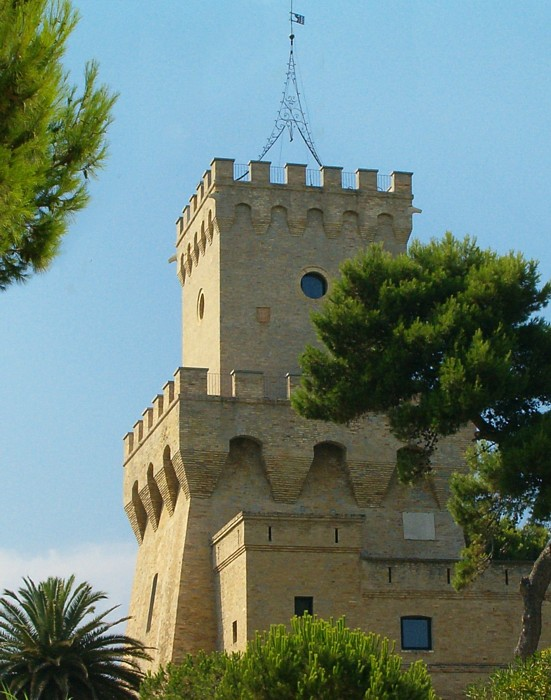

- Coat of arms

- Location within Italy Location within Abruzzo
- Coordinates: 42°37′N 14°4′E
- Country: Italy
- Region: Abruzzo
- Province: Teramo (TE)
- Frazioni: Borgo Santa Maria Immacolata, Colle Morino, Croce Ferretti, Mutignano, Scerne, Torre Cerrano, Torre San Rocco

Government
  - Mayor: Alberto Dell'Orletta (Ind.)

Area
  - Total: 37.69 km^{2} (14.55 sq mi)
- Elevation: 4 m (13 ft)

Population (1 January 2009)
  - Total: 14,430
  - Density: 382.9/km^{2} (991.6/sq mi)
- Demonym: Pinetesi
- Time zone: UTC+1 (CET)
  - Summer (DST): UTC+2 (CEST)
- Postal code: 64025
- Dialing code: 085
- Patron saint: St. Agnes
- Saint day: 21 January
- Website: Official website

The pine trees which give the city its name.

Pineto is a town and comune in the province of Teramo, Abruzzo, in central Italy. It is a 20th-century seaside resort on the Adriatic coast, with sandy beaches shaded by pine trees that give their name to the town.

== Geography ==
Pineto is known as one of the Sette Sorelle ("Seven Sisters"), seven Adriatic beach resorts in the province of Teramo; from north to south they are Martinsicuro, Alba Adriatica, Tortoreto, Giulianova, Roseto degli Abruzzi, Pineto and Silvi Marina. Pineto's beaches have received the "Blue Flag" (by the Foundation for Environmental Education – signifying water quality) in many years including 2007.

The Tower of Cerrano (Torre di Cerrano) is 2 kilometres (1 mile) from the town centre, at the town's southern border with Silvi Marina. It was built in the 16th century by the Holy Roman Emperor, Charles V as a watch tower to guard against attacks from the Turks and others based in what is now Croatia, 100 km (62 miles) across the Adriatic. Today, the tower houses a modern sea-biology laboratory. Future plans for this location by the Ministry of Environment, the Administration of the Province, the Administration of the City and the University of Teramo include a Sea Park.

D'Annunzio Street houses the patrician neo-classical style residences of Villa Marucci, Villa Pretaroli, Villa Caccianini and Villa Padula in Venetian style.

== History ==
In front of the Torre di Cerrano lie remains of the port used by the Roman town of Adria (now Atri), which is up in the hills behind Mutignano. Mutignano is a hill town and former capoluogo of the area, that grew up in the shadow of Atri. The town has a 15th-century Romanesque church dedicated to San Silvestro, and a Baroque church of Sant’Antonio. San Silvestro contains a mural, Tavola San Silvestro e sue storie, painted by the artist Andrea De Litio who is believed to have been born in Abruzzo.

Things started to change with the arrival of the "smooth sea road" in the early 19th century, which prompted the Filiani family to build a summer residence, the Villa Filiani. With the arrival of the Adriatic railway in 1860, this became the headquarters of their agricultural estates and industrial interests. There was much discussion whether the station should be in Atri or in the comune of Mutignano; Giacinto Filiani granted land for the construction of the Atri-Mutignano station and the prosperity of the area was ensured. Filiani built shops at the station approach, and a small community developed, but there was relatively little residential development until after World War I.

In the early 1920s Luigi Filiani developed the area as a beach resort, enhanced by the planting of pine trees. Despite opposition from the then mayor of Mutignano, in May 1923 he received a concession from the Maritime Agency to plant a pine wood that would revert to the State after 25 years. Filiani levelled the ground and planted 2000 umbrella pines (Pinus pinea) along the beach. He went on to plant pine trees, holm oaks and laurel on the surrounding hills.

Previously, the coast between the Filiani house and Torre di Cerrano was variously known as Atri-Mutignano or Villa Filiani. Inspired by the poem La Pioggia nel Pineto ("Rain in the Pinewood") by Gabriele d'Annunzio, Filiani changed the name to Pineto in 1925. In 1929 it replaced Mutignano as capoluogo of the comune.

== Culture ==
As a relatively new town, Pineto does not contain ancient churches, palazzos or other antiquities. However the ancient town of Mutignano above the hills overlooking Pineto is a place of traditional village festivals and feasts. Mutignano offers traditional village festivals and feasts: in summer there takes place the famous one of St. Mary, at the first Sunday of August which lasts for three days. Along the town streets one can find distinctive wall paintings which show scenes of the life in town.

== Twin towns ==
- Ostrowiec Świętokrzyski, Poland
- Drochia, Moldova
- La Louvière, Belgium
- Razlog, Bulgaria (since 2016)
- Šibenik, Croatia (since 2016)
- De Pinte, Belgium (since 2020)
