= 1978 Giro d'Italia =

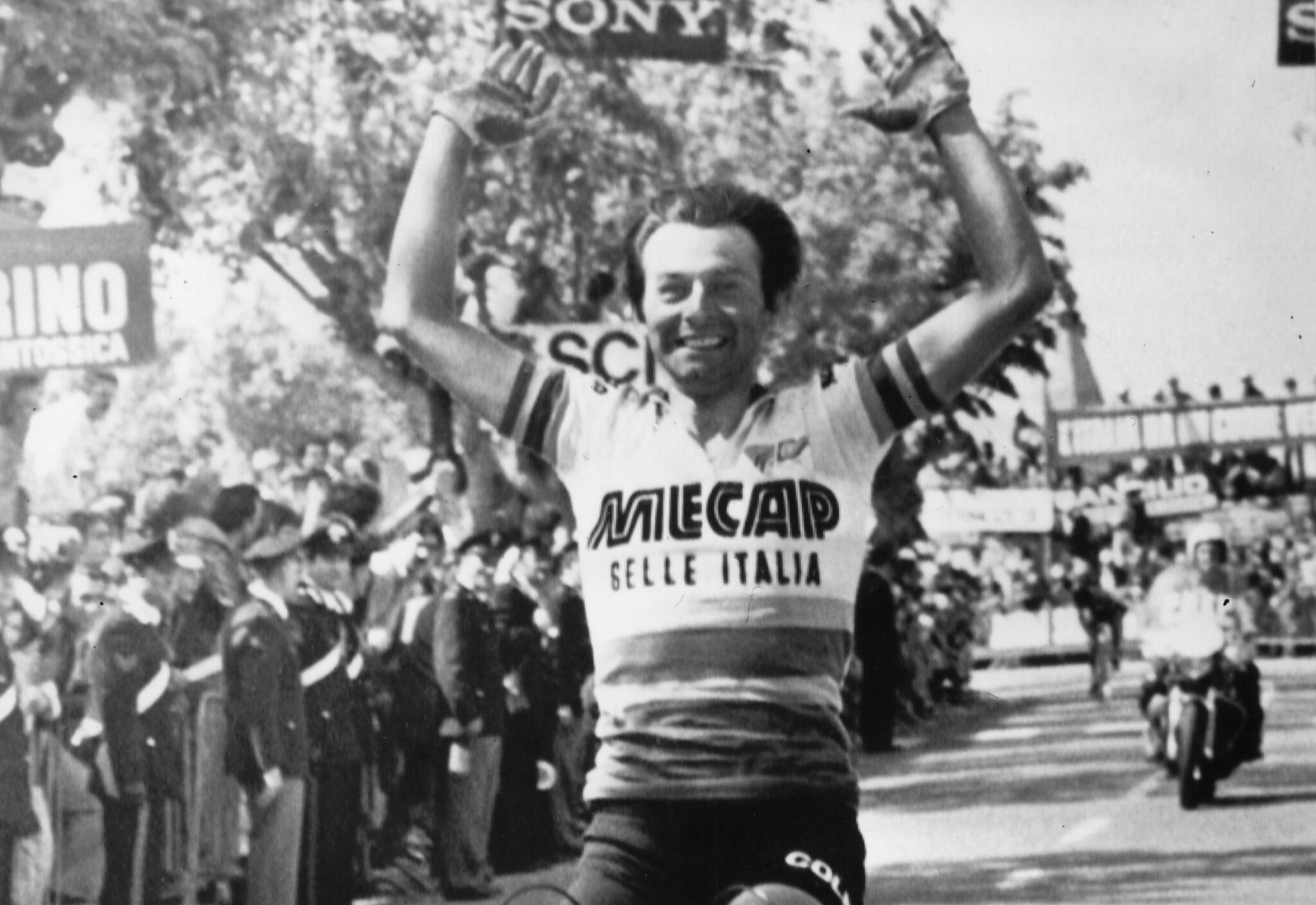
- Bruno Zanoni winning the 11th stage

Race details
- Dates: 7–28 May 1978
- Stages: 20 + Prologue, including one split stage
- Distance: 3,610.5 km (2,243.5 mi)
- Winning time: 101h 31' 22"

Results
| Jersey awarded to the overall winner | Winner | Johan De Muynck (BEL) | (Bianchi) |
| | Second | Gianbattista Baronchelli (ITA) | (Scic) |
| | Third | Francesco Moser (ITA) | (Sanson) |
| Jersey awarded to the points classification winner | Points | Francesco Moser (ITA) | (Sanson) |
| Jersey awarded to the mountains classification winner | Mountains | Ueli Sutter (SUI) | (Zonca) |
| Jersey awarded to the young rider classification winner | Young rider | Roberto Visentini (ITA) | (Vibor) |
| | Combination | Giuseppe Saronni (ITA) | (Scic) |
| Jersey awarded to the sprints classification winner | Sprints | Fiorenzo Favero (ITA) | (Intercontinentale Assicurazioni) |
| | Team | Bianchi - Faema | |

The 1978 Giro d'Italia was the 61st running of the Giro, one of cycling's Grand Tours. It started in Saint-Vincent, on 7 May, with a 2 km (1.2 mi) prologue and concluded in Milan, on 28 May, with a 220 km (136.7 mi) mass-start stage. A total of 130 riders from thirteen teams entered the 20-stage race, that was won by Belgian Johan de Muynck of the Bianchi team. The second and third places were taken by Italians Gianbattista Baronchelli and Francesco Moser, respectively. As of the beginning of the 2021 cycling season this was the last time a Belgian rider won a Grand Tour.

Amongst the other classifications that the race awarded, Sanson's Moser won the points classification, Ueli Sutter of Zonca won the mountains classification, and Vibor's Roberto Visentini completed the Giro as the best neo-professional in the general classification, finishing fifteenth overall. Bianchi finishing as the winners of the team points classification.

== Teams ==
A total of 13 teams were invited to participate in the 1978 Giro d'Italia. In total, 95 riders were from Italy, while the remaining 37 riders came from: Belgium (13), Spain (9), West Germany (4), Switzerland (3), the Netherlands (2), Great Britain (1), New Zealand (1), Norway (1), and Sweden (1). Each team sent a squad of ten riders, which meant that the race started with a peloton of 130 cyclists.

Of those starting, 45 were riding the Giro d'Italia for the first time. The average age of riders was 26.78 years, ranging from 20–year–old Corrado Donadio (Vibor) to 37–year–old Franco Bitossi (Gis Gelati). The team with the youngest average rider age was Intercontinentale Assicurazioni (22), while the oldest was Bianchi (29). From those that started, a total of 90 riders made it to the finish in Milan.

The teams entering the race were:

- Bianchi
- Fiorella
- Gis Gelati
- Ijsboerke-Gios
- Intercontinentale Assicurazioni
- Magniflex-Torpado
- Mecap-Selle Italia
- Sanson
- Scic
- Selle Royal-Inoxpran
- Teka
- Vibor
- Zonca

== Route and stages ==
The route for the race was revealed on 8 March 1978. The start of the race was moved up one week and three stage were cancelled so the race did not interfere with the World Cup that started on 1 June in Argentina. The fourteenth stage took the race into the Venice for a time trial. As the city was not conducive to the event, four ramps were created to allow for riders to ride up and down on canal crossings, as well as one floating bridge over the Grand Canal. The route will feature 25 km of elevation gain.

Stage results
| Stage | Date | Course | Distance | Type | Winner |
|---|---|---|---|---|---|
| P | 7 May | Saint-Vincent | 2 km (1 mi) | Individual time trial | Dietrich Thurau (GER) |
| 1 | 8 May | Saint-Vincent to Novi Ligure | 175 km (109 mi) | Plain stage | Rik Van Linden (BEL) |
| 2 | 9 May | Novi Ligure to La Spezia | 195 km (121 mi) | Stage with mountain(s) | Giuseppe Saronni (ITA) |
| 3 | 10 May | La Spezia to Càscina | 183 km (114 mi) | Stage with mountain(s) | Johan De Muynck (BEL) |
| 4 | 11 May | Larciano to Pistoia | 25 km (16 mi) | Individual time trial | Dietrich Thurau (GER) |
| 5 | 12 May | Prato to Cattolica | 200 km (124 mi) | Stage with mountain(s) | Rik Van Linden (BEL) |
| 6 | 13 May | Cattolica to Silvi Marina | 218 km (135 mi) | Plain stage | Rik Van Linden (BEL) |
| 7 | 14 May | Silvi Marina to Benevento | 242 km (150 mi) | Stage with mountain(s) | Giuseppe Saronni (ITA) |
| 8 | 15 May | Benevento to Ravello | 175 km (109 mi) | Stage with mountain(s) | Giuseppe Saronni (ITA) |
| 9 | 16 May | Amalfi to Latina | 248 km (154 mi) | Plain stage | Enrico Paolini (ITA) |
| 10 | 17 May | Latina to Lago di Piediluco | 220 km (137 mi) | Stage with mountain(s) | Giuseppe Martinelli (ITA) |
| 11a | 18 May | Terni to Assisi | 74 km (46 mi) | Plain stage | Bruno Zanoni (ITA) |
| 11b | 18 May | Assisi to Siena | 145 km (90 mi) | Plain stage | Francesco Moser (ITA) |
| 12 | 19 May | Poggibonsi to Monte Trebbio | 204 km (127 mi) | Stage with mountain(s) | Giancarlo Bellini (ITA) |
| 13 | 20 May | Modigliana to Padua | 183 km (114 mi) | Plain stage | Francesco Moser (ITA) |
| 14 | 21 May | Venezia to Venezia | 12 km (7 mi) | Individual time trial | Francesco Moser (ITA) |
| | 22 May | Rest day | | | |
| 15 | 23 May | Treviso to Canazei | 234 km (145 mi) | Stage with mountain(s) | Gianbattista Baronchelli (ITA) |
| 16 | 24 May | Mazzin to Cavalese | 48 km (30 mi) | Individual time trial | Francesco Moser (ITA) |
| 17 | 25 May | Cavalese to Monte Bondone | 205 km (127 mi) | Stage with mountain(s) | Wladimiro Panizza (ITA) |
| 18 | 26 May | Mezzolombardo to Sarezzo | 245 km (152 mi) | Stage with mountain(s) | Giuseppe Perletto (ITA) |
| 19 | 27 May | Brescia to Inverigo | 175 km (109 mi) | Stage with mountain(s) | Vittorio Algeri (ITA) |
| 20 | 28 May | Inverigo to Milan | 220 km (137 mi) | Plain stage | Pierino Gavazzi (ITA) |
| | Total | | 3,610 km (2,243 mi) | | |

== Classification leadership ==
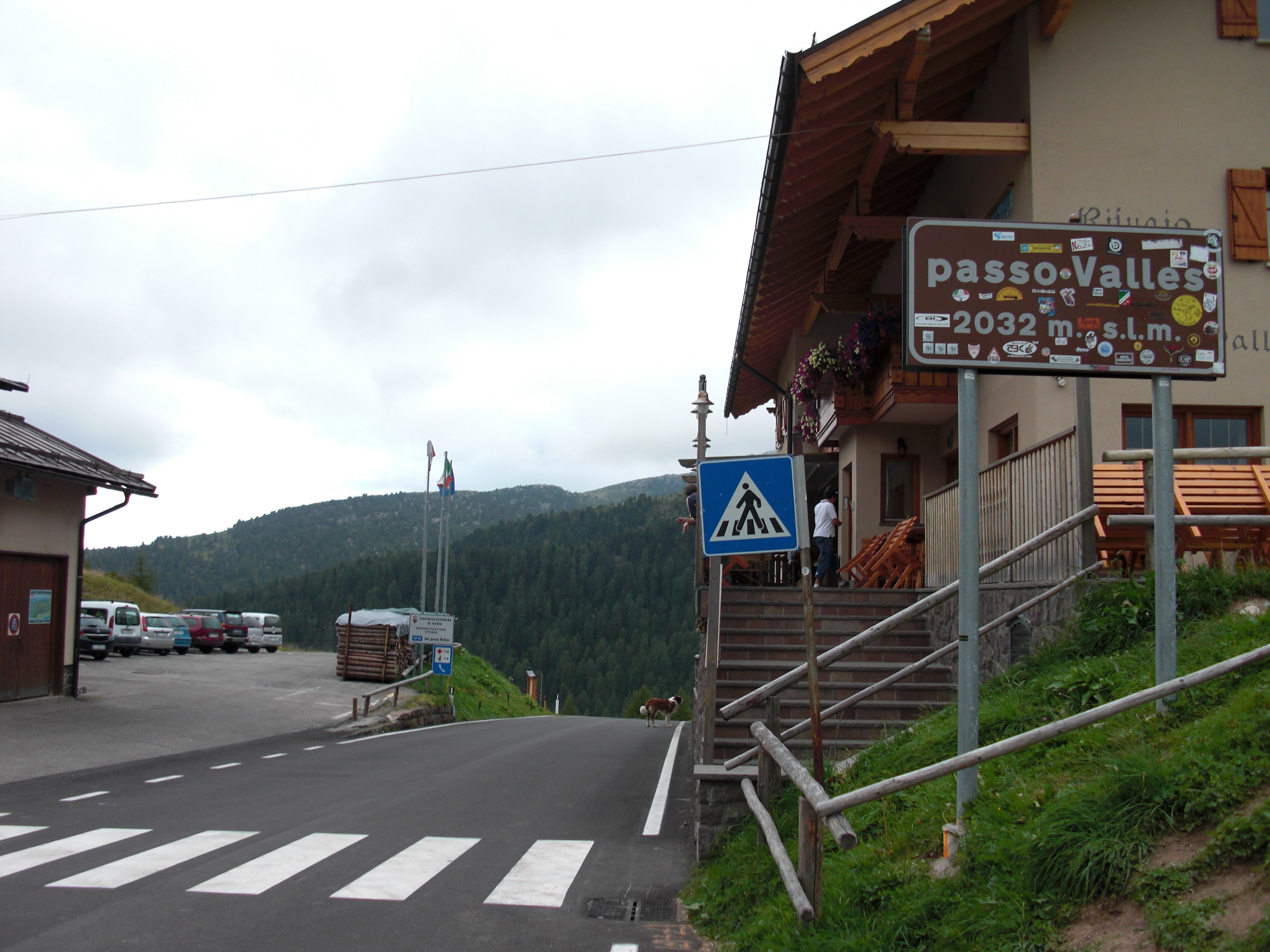
The Passo Valles was the Cima Coppi for the 1978 running of the Giro d'Italia.

There were four main individual classifications contested in the 1978 Giro d'Italia, as well as a team competition. Four of them awarded jerseys to their leaders. The general classification was the most important and was calculated by adding each rider's finishing times on each stage. The rider with the lowest cumulative time was the winner of the general classification and was considered the overall winner of the Giro. The rider leading the classification wore a pink jersey to signify the classification's leadership.

The second classification was the points classification. Riders received points for finishing in the top positions in a stage finish, with first place getting the most points, and lower placings getting successively fewer points. The rider leading this classification wore a purple (or cyclamen) jersey.

The mountains classification was the third classification and its leader was denoted by the green jersey. In this ranking, points were won by reaching the summit of a climb ahead of other cyclists. Each climb was ranked as either first, second or third category, with more points available for higher category climbs. Most stages of the race included one or more categorized climbs, in which points were awarded to the riders that reached the summit first. The Cima Coppi, the race's highest point of elevation, awarded more points than the other first category climbs. The Cima Coppi for this Giro was the Passo Valles, which was first summited by Italian rider Gianbattista Baronchelli.

The fourth classification, the young rider classification, was decided the same way as the general classification, but exclusive to neo-professional cyclists (in their first three years of professional racing). The leader of the classification wore a white jersey.

Another classification was the team classification, awarded no jersey to its leaders. This was calculated by adding together points earned by each rider on the team during each stage through the intermediate sprints, the categorized climbs, stage finishes, etc. The team with the most points led the classification.

There were other minor classifications within the race, including the Campionato delle Regioni classification. The leader wore a blue jersey with colored vertical stripes ("maglia azzurra con banda tricolore verticale").

The Fiat Ritmo classification, created in the 1976 edition, was used again, but this year the winner received a Fiat Ritmo. For this classification, there was one intermediate sprint per stage, and the first three riders scored points.

Classification leadership by stage
| Stage | Winner | General classification | Points classification | Mountains classification | Young rider classification | Campionato delle Regioni | FIAT | Team classification |
|---|---|---|---|---|---|---|---|---|
| P | Dietrich Thurau | not awarded (Note: Riders were not obliged to start the prologue, and the prologue times did not count for the general classification) | not awarded | not awarded | not awarded | not awarded | not awarded | not awarded |
| 1 | Rik Van Linden | Rik Van Linden | Rik Van Linden | not awarded | ? | Alessio Antonini | Piero Falorni | ? |
| 2 | Giuseppe Saronni | Rik Van Linden | Rik Van Linden | multiple riders | ? | ? | Luciano Rossignoli | ? |
| 3 | Johan De Muynck | Johan De Muynck | Rik Van Linden | multiple riders | ? | Arnaldo Caverzasi | Luciano Rossignoli | ? |
| 4 | Dietrich Thurau | Johan De Muynck | Giuseppe Saronni | multiple riders | Roberto Visentini | Arnaldo Caverzasi | Luciano Rossignoli | ? |
| 5 | Rik Van Linden | Johan De Muynck | Francesco Moser | Ueli Sutter | Roberto Visentini | Arnaldo Caverzasi | Luciano Rossignoli | ? |
| 6 | Rik Van Linden | Johan De Muynck | Rik Van Linden | Ueli Sutter | Roberto Visentini | ? | Luciano Rossignoli | ? |
| 7 | Giuseppe Saronni | Johan De Muynck | Roger De Vlaeminck | Ueli Sutter | Roberto Visentini | ? | Luciano Rossignoli | ? |
| 8 | Giuseppe Saronni | Johan De Muynck | Giuseppe Saronni | Ueli Sutter | Roberto Visentini | Alessio Antonini | Luciano Rossignoli | ? |
| 9 | Enrico Paolini | Johan De Muynck | Roger De Vlaeminck | Ueli Sutter | Roberto Visentini | ? | Luciano Rossignoli | ? |
| 10 | Giuseppe Martinelli | Johan De Muynck | Giuseppe Saronni | Ueli Sutter | Roberto Visentini | ? | Luciano Rossignoli | ? |
| 11a | Bruno Zanoni | Johan De Muynck | Giuseppe Saronni | Ueli Sutter | Roberto Visentini | ? | Luciano Rossignoli | ? |
| 11b | Francesco Moser | Johan De Muynck | Roger De Vlaeminck | Ueli Sutter | Roberto Visentini | Alessio Antonini | Luciano Rossignoli | ? |
| 12 | Giancarlo Bellini | Johan De Muynck | Francesco Moser | Ueli Sutter | Roberto Visentini | ? | Luciano Rossignoli | ? |
| 13 | Francesco Moser | Johan De Muynck | Francesco Moser | Ueli Sutter | Roberto Visentini | ? | Luciano Rossignoli | ? |
| 14 | Francesco Moser | Johan De Muynck | Francesco Moser | Ueli Sutter | Roberto Visentini | ? | Luciano Rossignoli | ? |
| 15 | Gianbattista Baronchelli | Johan De Muynck | Francesco Moser | Gianbattista Baronchelli | Roberto Visentini | ? | Luciano Rossignoli | ? |
| 16 | Francesco Moser | Johan De Muynck | Francesco Moser | Gianbattista Baronchelli | Roberto Visentini | ? | Luciano Rossignoli | ? |
| 17 | Wladimiro Panizza | Johan De Muynck | Francesco Moser | Ueli Sutter | Roberto Visentini | ? | Luciano Rossignoli | ? |
| 18 | Giuseppe Perletto | Johan De Muynck | Francesco Moser | Ueli Sutter | Roberto Visentini | ? | Luciano Rossignoli | ? |
| 19 | Vittorio Algeri | Johan De Muynck | Francesco Moser | Ueli Sutter | Roberto Visentini | ? | Luciano Rossignoli | ? |
| 20 | Pierino Gavazzi | Johan De Muynck | Francesco Moser | Ueli Sutter | Roberto Visentini | Fiorenzo Favero | Luciano Rossignoli | Bianchi |
| Final | | Johan De Muynck | Francesco Moser | Ueli Sutter | Roberto Visentini | Fiorenzo Favero | Luciano Rossignoli | Bianchi |

== Final standings ==
Legend
| Pink jersey | Denotes the winner of the General classification |
| Purple jersey | Denotes the winner of the Points classification |
| Green jersey | Denotes the winner of the Mountains classification |
| Blue white | Denotes the winner of the Young rider classification |
| Blue jersey | Denotes the winner of the Campionato delle Regioni classification |

=== General classification ===
Final general classification (1–10)
| Rank | Name | Team | Time |
|---|---|---|---|
| 1 | Johan De Muynck (BEL) | Bianchi | 101h 31' 22" |
| 2 | Gianbattista Baronchelli (ITA) | Scic | + 59" |
| 3 | Francesco Moser (ITA) | Sanson | + 2' 19" |
| 4 | Wladimiro Panizza (ITA) | Vibor | + 7' 57" |
| 5 | Giuseppe Saronni (ITA) | Scic | + 8' 19" |
| 6 | Ronald De Witte (BEL) | Sanson | + 8' 24" |
| 7 | Alfio Vandi (ITA) | Magniflex | + 9' 04" |
| 8 | Claudio Bortolotto (ITA) | Sanson | + 9' 25" |
| 9 | Bernt Johansson (SWE) | Fiorella | + 12' 36" |
| 10 | Ueli Sutter (SUI) | Zonca | + 12' 38" |

=== Points classification ===
Final points classification (1–5)
| | Rider | Team | Points |
|---|---|---|---|
| 1 | Francesco Moser (ITA) | Sanson | 275 |
| 2 | Giuseppe Saronni (ITA) | Scic | 274 |
| 3 | Gianbattista Baronchelli (ITA) | Scic | 260 |
| 4 | Pierino Gavazzi (ITA) | Zonca | 130 |
| 5 | Johan De Muynck (BEL) | Bianchi | 118 |

=== Mountains classification ===
Final mountains classification (1–5)
| | Rider | Team | Points |
|---|---|---|---|
| 1 | Ueli Sutter (SUI) | Zonca | 830 |
| 2 | Gianbattista Baronchelli (ITA) | Scic | 520 |
| 3 | Claudio Bortolotto (ITA) | Sanson | 345 |
| 4 | Pedro Torres (ESP) | Teka | 345 |
| 5 | Johan De Muynck (BEL) | Bianchi | 290 |

=== Young rider classification ===
Final young rider classification (1–5)
| | Rider | Team | Time |
|---|---|---|---|
| 1 | Roberto Visentini (ITA) | Vibor | 101h 50' 17" |
| 2 | Giancarlo Casiraghi (ITA) | Intercontinentale Assicurazioni | + 41' 33" |
| 3 | Ennio Vanotti (ITA) | Zonca | + 54' 39" |
| 4 | Claudio Corti (ITA) | Zonca | + 1h 05' 20" |
| 5 | Vincenzo De Caro (ITA) | Mecap | + 1h 19' 15" |

=== Campionato delle Regioni classification ===
Final Campionato delle Regioni classification (1–5)
| | Rider | Team | Points |
|---|---|---|---|
| 1 | Fiorenzo Favero (ITA) | Intercontinentale Assicurazioni | 38 |
| 2 | Alessio Antonini (ITA) | Selle Royal-Inoxpran | 27 |
| 3 | Giuseppe Martinelli (ITA) | Magniflex | 19 |
| 4 | Giuseppe Saronni (ITA) | Scic | 17 |
| 5 | Giancarlo Tartoni (ITA) | Magniflex | 13 |

=== Traguardo Fiat Ritmo classification ===
Final Traguardo Fiat Ritmo classification (1–3)
| | Rider | Team | Points |
|---|---|---|---|
| 1 | Luciano Rossignoli (ITA) | Fiorella | 37 |
| 2 | Walter Dusi (ITA) | Intercontinentale Assicurazioni | 16 |
| 3 | Ottavio Crepaldi (ITA) | Magniflex | 13 |

=== Team points classification ===
Final team points classification (1–3)
| | Team | Points |
|---|---|---|
| 1 | Bianchi | 15,540 |
| 2 | Sanson | 9,420 |
| 3 | Scic | 8,107 |

== Doping ==
There were no positive doping tests in the Giro of 1978.
