= Hatria =

Hatria (Greek: Ἀτρία) may refer to:

- Hatria, an alternative spelling for the Etruscan city that is now Adria in the Veneto region of Northern Italy
- Hatria, an alternative spelling for the city that is now Atri in the Abruzzo region of Central Italy
