= Bruno Zanoni =

Italian cyclist (1952–2023)

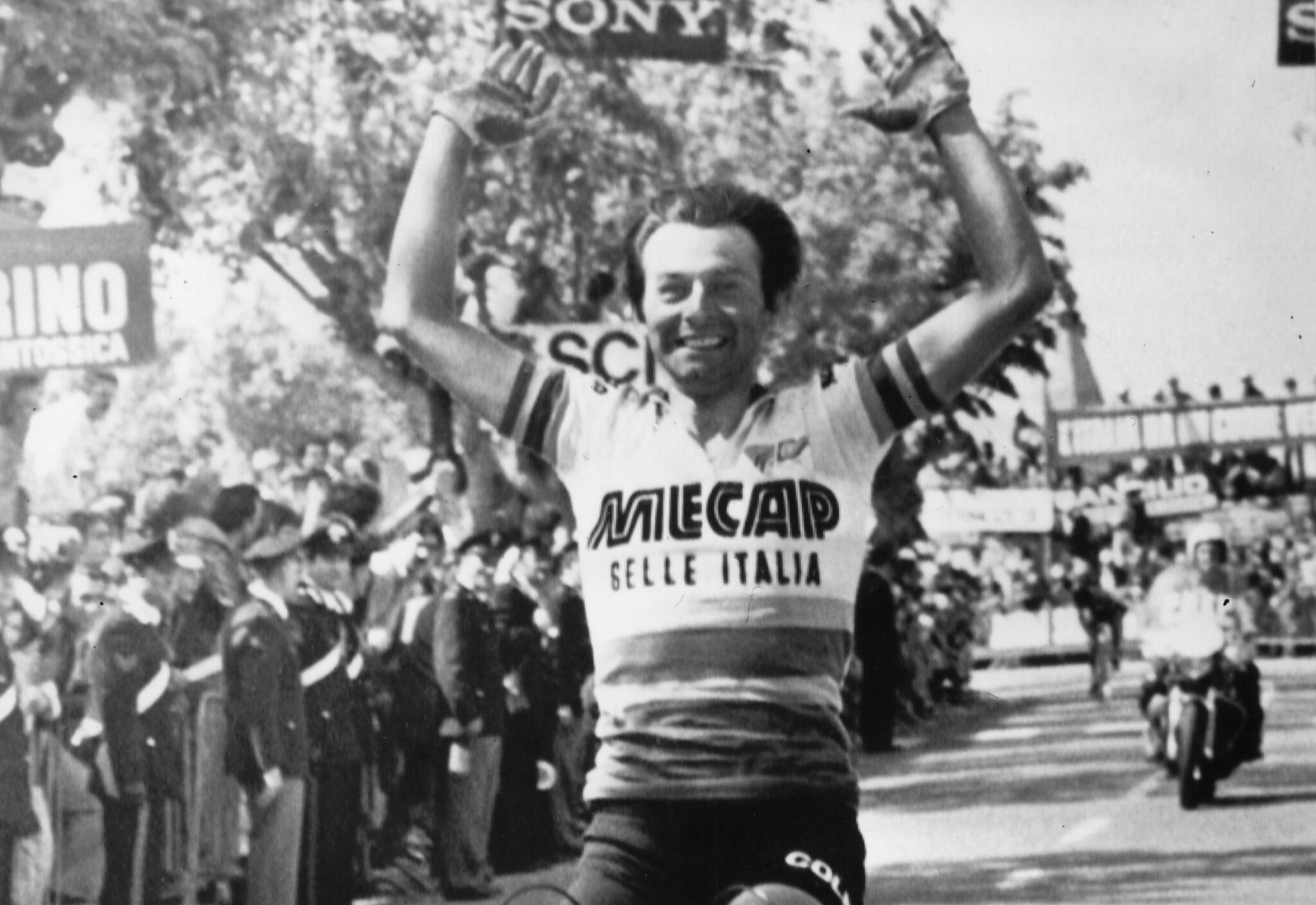
- Bruno Zanoni at Giro d'Italia 1978

Personal information
- Born: 29 July 1952 Nembro, Italy
- Died: 6 November 2023 (aged 71) Laigueglia

Cycling career
- Sport: Cycling
- Role: Rider

Bruno Zanoni (29 July 1952 – 6 November 2023) was an Italian racing cyclist. He won stage 11 of the 1978 Giro d'Italia.

== Life and career ==
Born in Nembro, in 1973 as a junior cyclist Zanoni won the Italian title in the individual pursuit specialty. A professional rider from 1974 to 1979, he mainly served as a domestique of Gianbattista Baronchelli. He ranked second in the stage 15 of the 1974 Giro d'Italia and won stage 11 of the 1978 Giro d'Italia. In the 1976 UCI Track Cycling World Championships he finished seventh in the men's individual pursuit event.

Zanoni became a popular mainstream figure after getting the black shirt for finishing in the last place in the 1979 Giro d'Italia, which got him participation in events and TV shows. He was the last Giro's black shirt, as this particular recognition was cancelled the following year. After his retirement, he worked as a restaurateur in a hotel in Laigueglia. He died on 6 November 2023, at the age of 71.
