= Lino Grava =

Italian footballer

Personal information
- Date of birth: 5 March 1927
- Place of birth: Vittorio Veneto, Italy
- Date of death: 18 January 2010 (aged 82)
- Place of death: Città Sant'Angelo, Italy
- Height: 1.77 m (5 ft 9 1/2 in)
- Position: Defender

Senior career*
Years	Team	Apps	(Gls)
1946–1947	Vittorio Veneto		
1947–1949	Milan	3	(0)
1949–1952	Torino	78	(0)
1952–1953	Internazionale	1	(0)
1953–1954	Monza	18	(1)
1954–1960	Torino	148	(0)
1960–1962	Verona	54	(0)
- * Club domestic league appearances and goals

Lino Grava (born 5 March 1927 in Vittorio Veneto; died 18 January 2010 in Città Sant'Angelo) was an Italian professional football player.

== Honours ==
- Serie A champion: 1952/53.
