= Sant'Antonio Abate, Cascia =

Church and convent in Umbria, Italy

Coordinates: 42.7188°N 13.0152°E

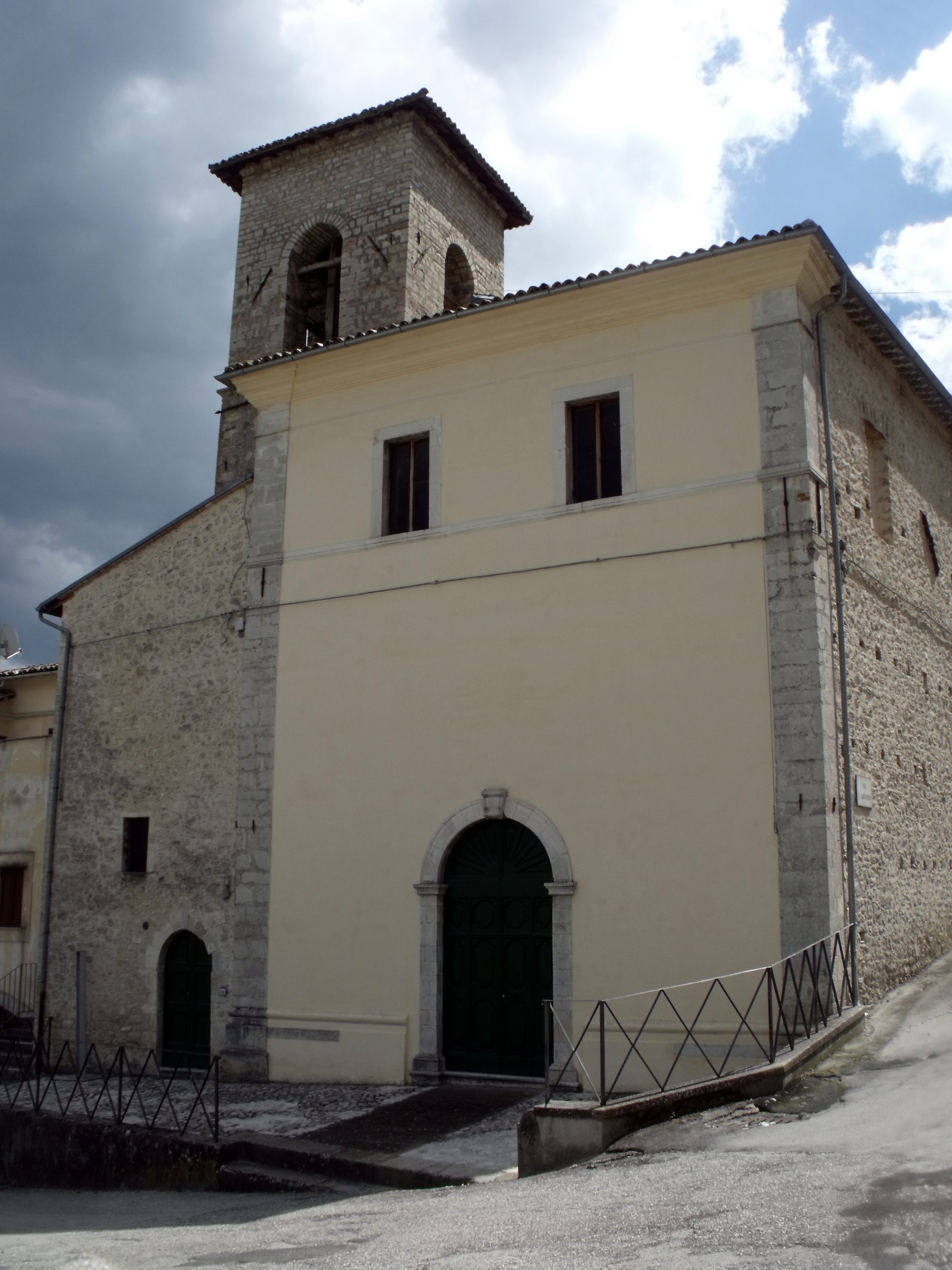
The church of Sant’Antonio Abate

Sant’Antonio Abate is a 14th-century church and convent located in Cascia, province of Perugia, region of Umbria, Italy.

== History ==
The convent was founded by the Benedictine order, and the church was frescoed in 14th century with frescoed by a painter (or painters) known as the Master of the Dormition, depicting the Life of St Anthony Abbot. A second series of frescoes depicting the Passion of Christ was painted in the second half of the 15th century by Nicola da Siena. The choir has a 15th-century wooden sculpture of Tobias and the Angel. On the counterfacade is an organ installed in 1630 by Luca Neri of Leonessa.
