= Bartolomeo di Tommaso =

Italian painter

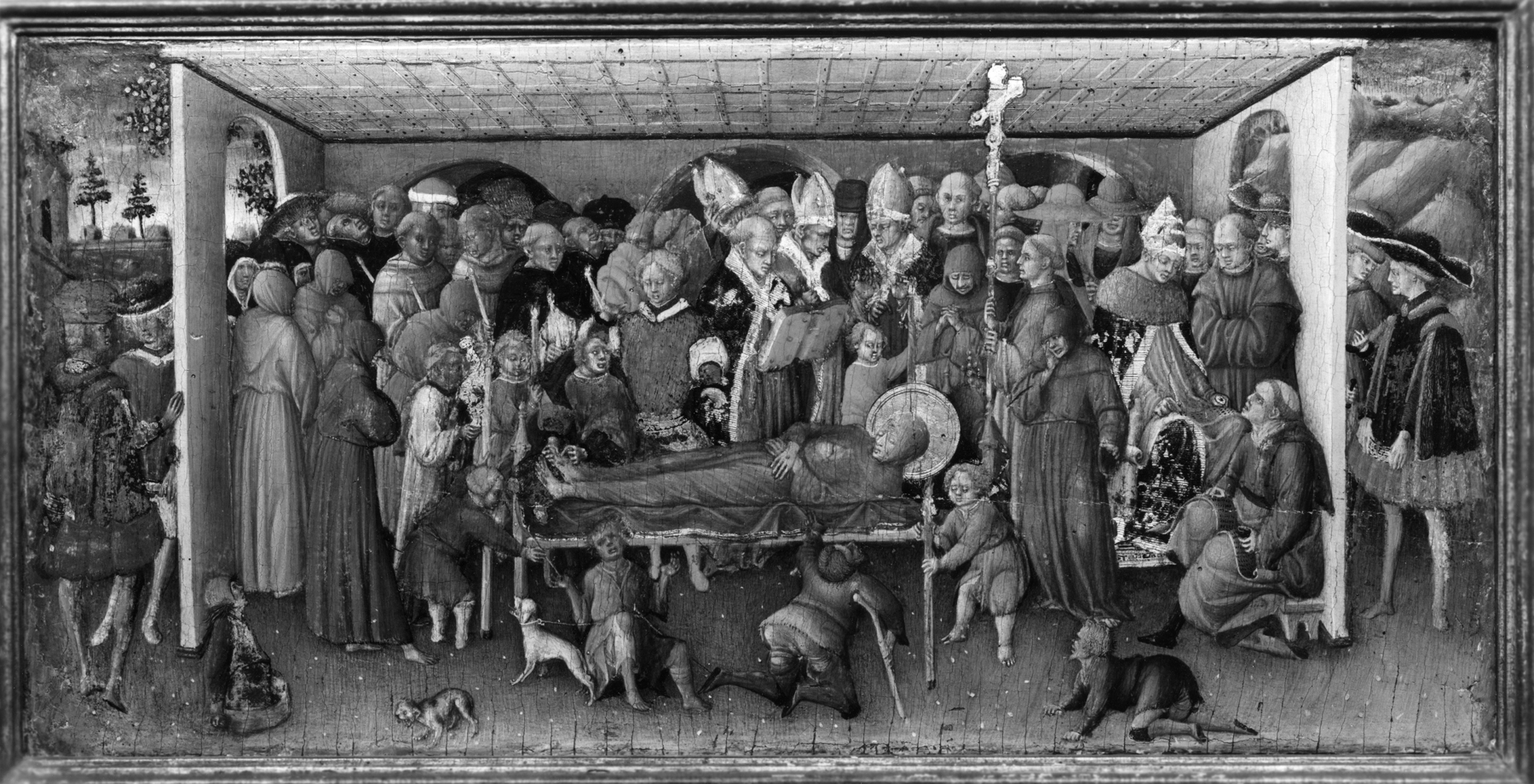
The Funeral of Saint Francis of Assisi by Bartolomeo di Tommaso, Walters Art Museum, 1430

Bartolomeo di Tommaso, also known as Bartolomeo da Foligno (born in Foligno, c. 1400, active by 1425, died 1453–54) was an Italian painter of the Umbro-Sienese school.

== Life and career ==
He was in Ancona from 1425 to 1442, when he returned to Foligno with his wife, Onofria, the sister of the painter Pierantonio Mezzastris. Bartolomeo was documented in Norcia in 1442, at work in the choir of Sant’ Agostino with a group of painters, including Nicola di Ulisse from Siena; Luca di Lorenzo from Germany; Giambono di Corrado of Ragusa; and Andrea de Litio. The administration of Pope Nicholas V asked him to come to Rome and work in various projects.

He painted a Virgin and Saints in 1430 for the church of San Salvatore at Foligno.
