= Silvi, Abruzzo =

Silvi Silvi
- Comune
- Comune di Silvi
- Flag
- Nickname: "Pearl of the Adriatic" or "Maldives of Abruzzo"
- Motto: Olim Castrum Silvi
- Location within Italy Location within Abruzzo
- Coordinates: 42°33′N 14°7′E
- Country: Italy
- Region: Abruzzo
- Province: Teramo (TE)
- Frazioni: Pianacce, San Silvestre, Santo Stefano, Silvi Paese, Silvi Marina

Government
  - Mayor: Andrea Scordella (Lega)

Area
  - Total: 20.63 km^{2} (7.97 sq mi)
- Elevation: 2 m (6.6 ft)
- Lowest elevation: 0 m (0 ft)

Population (30 November 2016)
  - Total: 15,661
  - Density: 759.1/km^{2} (1,966/sq mi)
- Demonym: Silvaroli
- Time zone: UTC+1 (CET)
  - Summer (DST): UTC+2 (CEST)
- Postal code: 64028 Silvi Paese, 64029 Silvi Marina, 64030 San Silvestre
- Dialing code: 085
- Patron saint: Saint Leo
- Website: Official website

Silvi is an Italian comune in the province of Teramo, about 15 kilometres (9 mi) north of Pescara, in the Abruzzo region of central Italy. It stretches from Silvi Marina, a small seaside resort on the Adriatic Coast, to Silvi Paese up in the hills.

== History ==
Born as a tiny hamlet in the hills and too small for a history and culture of its own, Silvi was strongly connected with the powerful Hatria Picena (Atri) as early as the 6th century BC. Alongside Hatria Picena, the hamlet was conquered by the Romans in 290 BC, when it was controlled, fortified and renamed Castrum Silvae.

Silvi is closely tied to Atri's history, being only a short distance away. In the 13th and 14th centuries Silvi was a main cog of a coastal defense system based on day and night signals through fires and smoke to alert the government in Naples of the frequent landings of Turks and pirates. Through a series of mirrors, fire and smoke signals, these coastal defenses could relay information that could be received in Naples (capital of the Kingdom) in mere hours.

In the 14th century the medieval borough of Castrum Silvi, as it was known, became a fiefdom of the abbey of San Giovanni in Venere (located kilometers away, in what is now the province of Chieti), then passed to the jurisdiction of the Acquaviva family of Atri. At the time Silvi Marina was a small poor port of fishermen. Silvi remained a fiefdom of Atri until the arrival of Napoleon in Italy, who abolished feudalism in 1806.

By 1863 the building of the coastal railway and the station at the coast helped the development of the "Marina" part of Silvi, which little by little took over the government and administration, thanks mostly to investments in the tourist sector. In 1931 the municipal seat was moved from Silvi Paese to Silvi Marina, which within a few years turned into an important seaside resort, becoming the administrative center of all the territory, from the coast to the surrounding hills.

=== Symbols ===
The comune's coat of arms features Silvi's castle, located by the sea. The castle is flanked by two plants, both representing the comune's important role in the liquorice industry.

On Silvi's banner, the symbols are placed on a red and blue background.

== Geography ==
The old town of Silvi Paese (or Silvi Alta) is located 242 metres above sea level on a hill overlooking the surrounding coast.

The modern part of the comune (Silvi Marina) is situated at the feet of the hill, stretching for 9km along the Adriatic coast. It extends from the mouth of the torrent Cerrano (north) to the mouth of the torrent Piomba (south).

Silvi borders on Pineto (north), Atri (west), Città Sant'Angelo (south) and the Adriatic Sea (east).

== Main sights ==
- The Belvedere of Silvi Paese, perched on top of a hill, 250 metres (820 ft) above sea level, which duplicates the once defensive garrison against the Saracens and offers a spectacular sight on the whole Central Adriatic, sweeping from the Croatian coast to Monte Conero (N) and the Tremiti Islands (S) on a clear day.
- Church of San Salvatore, in Silvi Paese, with a bell-tower, dating from the 13th century
- Torre di Cerrano at the ancient harbor of Atri and Silvi. Located on the beach between Silvi Marina and Pineto, it was developed when Atri abandoned the Vomano harbor. It is named for the Fosso Cerrano, a gully which runs along the sides of the hill down towards the sea. It served as a watch tower for Turkish invaders. Today the tower houses a marine biology station for the central Adriatic area
- Fashionable villas of the late 19th to early 20th centuries after the railroad was developed

== Culture ==
Fosso Concio, which was known as "Concio della Liquirizia" (from the word "acconciare" which means prepare in Abruzzese dialect) because it was here where the roots of the plant, which grew wild and copiously along the hillsides of the Piomba and the Vomano Rivers, were harvested gives rise to its licorice manufacturing industry - known throughout Italy and Europe - with Saila Liquirizia (now part of LEAF Italia spa) and products of Aurelio Menozzi & De Rosa Company. Licorice root has been popular in the Abruzzo region for centuries.

=== Lu Ciancialon ===
"Lu Ciancialon" is a tradition that dates back to the 16th century when Silvi was the target of Turkish invaders. It is celebrated on the last Sunday in May in the old town of Silvi Paese, where the local community gets together to torch a 10-metre bonfire made of dried reeds.

== Name origin ==
Historians are unsure about the true origin of the comune's name. Some academics believe the name Silvi comes from the Latin silvae due to the abundance of trees in the area. Others believe it derives from the Roman god Silvanus, the ancient deity of woods.

In Roman times, the comune was known as Matrinum first and then Silvae, whereas during the Middle Ages it was called Castel Belfiore or Castrum Silvi.

== Economy ==
=== Tourism ===
Silvi is a well-known tourist spot on the Adriatic coast, attracting visitors from all over the country and Europe. In 2008, it was awarded the Blue Flag, recognising the overall quality of its beaches.

== Sport ==
Silvi is home to two football clubs: A.S.D. Silvi and Castrum Silvi. Both teams wear blue-and-red shirts and play in the Abruzzo Promozione league, with all home matches taking place at the Ughetto Di Febo stadium, which can hold up to 2,400 spectators.

== Twin Town ==
- Ulcinj (Dulcigno), Montenegro

== See also ==
- Italy
