= Nicola di Ulisse =

Italian painter

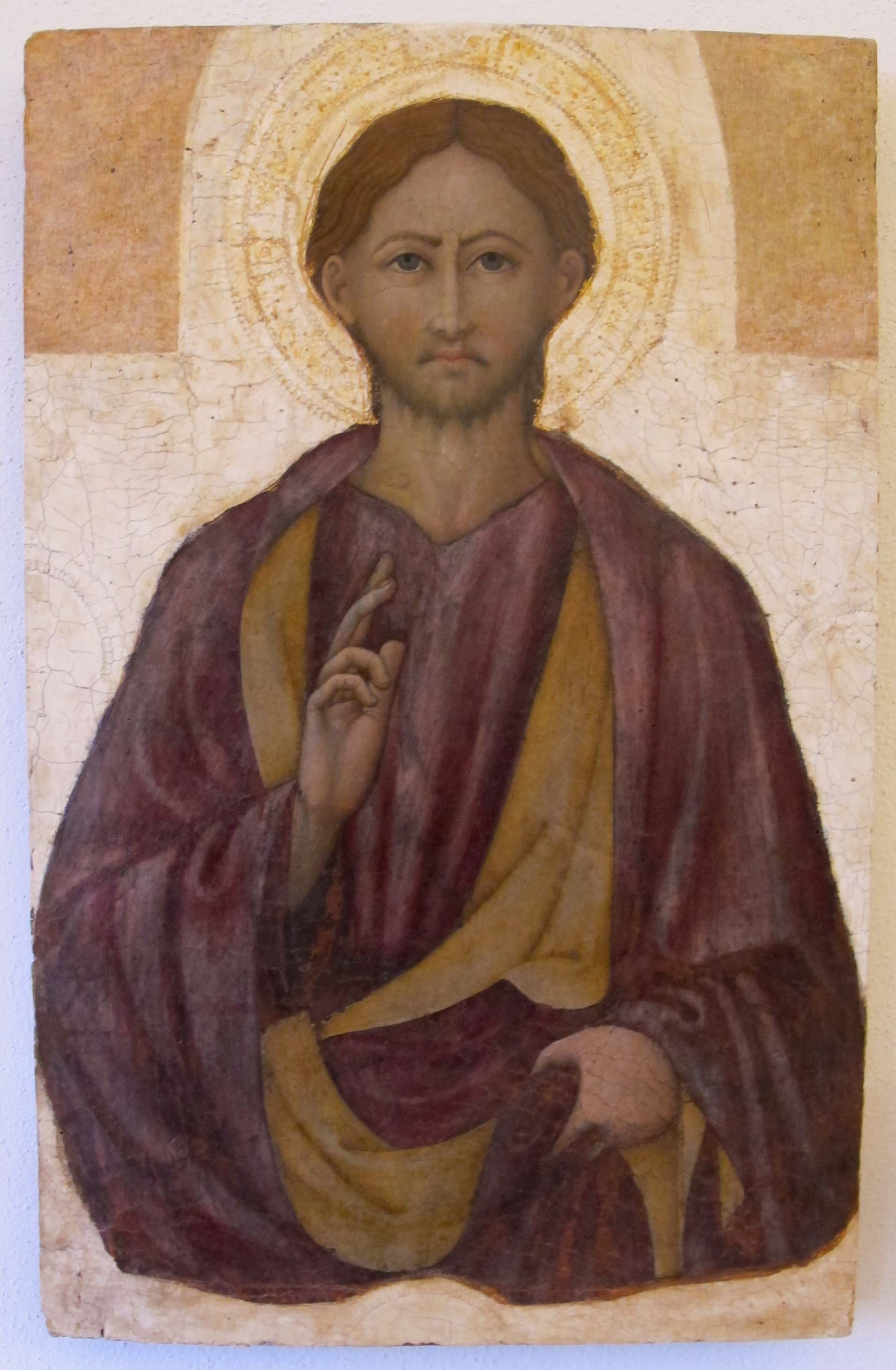
Blessing of Christ from San Pietro a Castelvecchio

Nicola di Ulisse, also known as Nicola da Siena or Nicola di Ulisse da Siena (active 1442 - 1470) was an Italian painter of the Umbro-Sienese school.

Nicola was born in Siena, but was documented in Norcia by 1442, at work in the choir of Sant’ Agostino with a group of painters, including Bartolommeo di Tommaso from Foligno; Luca di Lorenzo from Germany; Giambono di Corrado of Ragusa; and Andrea de Litio. He also painted for the Abbey of Sant’Eutizio in Spoleto. He died after 1472.

Among his masterworks, is a series of frescoes depicting the Passion of Christ, painted for the church of Sant'Antonio Abate in Cascia, Umbria. He also painted a Deposition for the Collegiata of Santa Maria in Cascia. He is known to have collaborated with Bartolomeo di Tommaso, Andrea Delitio, Luca Alemanno, and Giambono di Corrado to fresco the tribune of the church of Sant'Agostino in Norcia. A polyptych depicting Saints Placido, Benedict, Spes, and Fiorenzo from the Abbey of Sant'Eutizio, attributed to Nicola, is now on display in the Museo Nazionale of Spoleto. A painting depicting St Ginesio protecting his town during a battle against the Fermani, now on display in the Pinacoteca Civica of San Gentili in San Ginesio province of Macerata.
