= Città Sant'Angelo =

- Comune
- Comune di Città Sant'Angelo
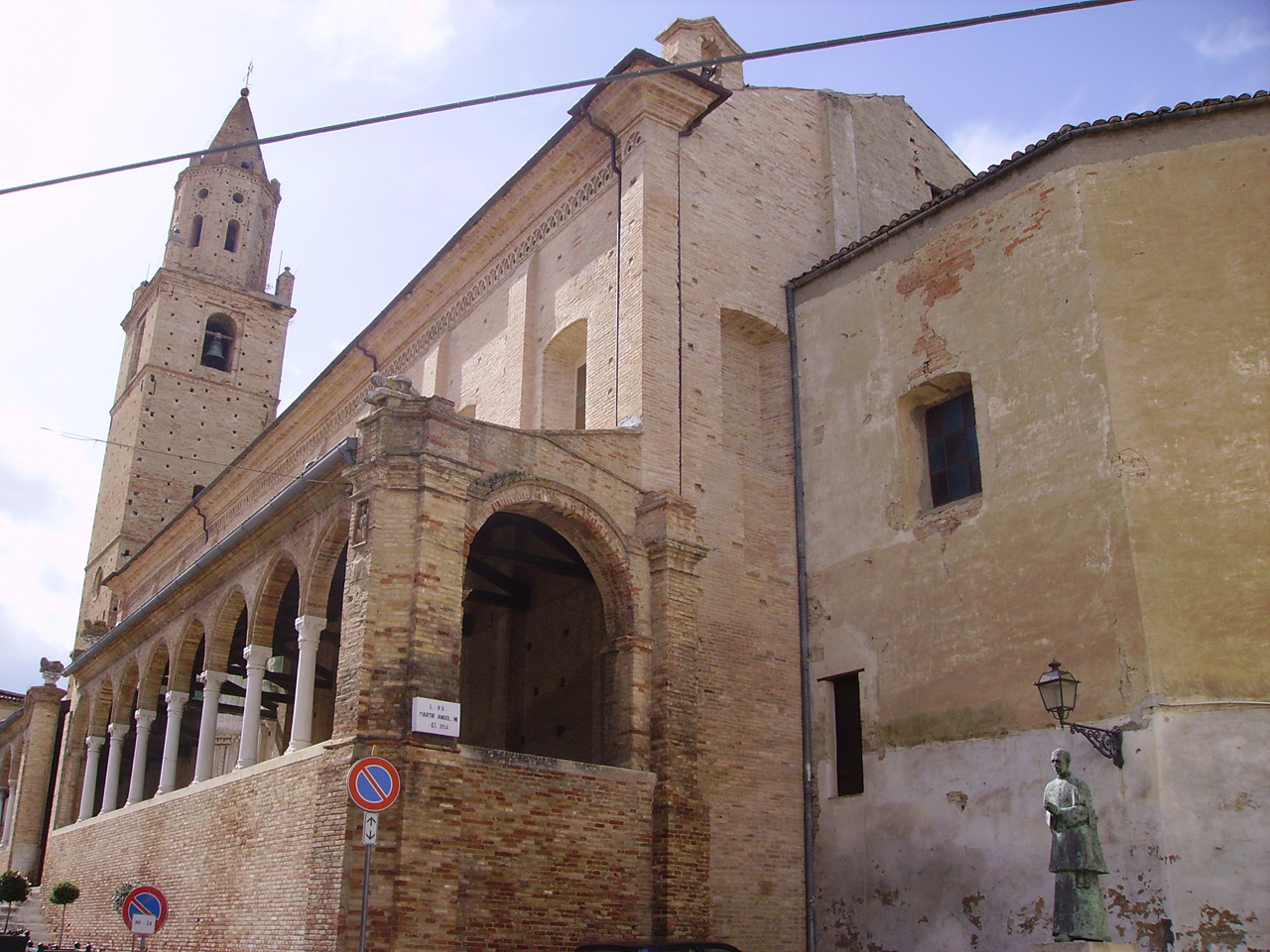
- View of Città Sant'Angelo

- Coat of arms

- Location within Italy Location within Abruzzo
- Coordinates: 42°31′N 14°03′E
- Country: Italy
- Region: Abruzzo
- Province: Pescara (PE)
- Frazioni: Alzano, Annunziata, Crocifisso, Fagnano, Fonte Umano, Gaglierani, Maddalena, Madonna della Pace, Marina, Piano della Cona, Piano di Sacco, Ponticelli, San Giacomo, San Martino, San Pietro, San Rocco, San Vittorino, Sant'Agnese, Sorricchio, Vertonica, Villa Cipressi

Government
  - Mayor: Matteo Perazzetti (FdI)

Area
  - Total: 61 km^{2} (24 sq mi)
- Elevation: 322 m (1,056 ft)

Population (31 May 2022)
  - Total: 14,786
  - Density: 240/km^{2} (630/sq mi)
- Demonym: Angolani
- Time zone: UTC+1 (CET)
  - Summer (DST): UTC+2 (CEST)
- Postal code: 65013
- Dialing code: 085
- Patron saint: Saint Michael the Archangel
- Website: Official website

Città Sant'Angelo (Italian: [tʃitˈta ssanˈtandʒelo]) is a city and comune in the province of Pescara, Abruzzo, Italy. It is one of I Borghi più belli d'Italia ("The most beautiful villages of Italy").

== History ==
The origins of Città Sant'Angelo are uncertain and have always been a basis for historical discussion, beginning with the Vestini, an ancient Sabine tribe. The numerous archaeological finds between the mouths of the Piomba and Saline Rivers, and the presence of small urban settlements at the site called Marina Sant'Angelo point to the origins of the town during the Roman period, located in the eastern portion of the Vestine region. Città Sant'Angelo appears to be located where Plinius wrote of the existence of one of the four Vestini cities, either Angelus or Angulum. It is cited from the 12th century as Castrum Sancti Angeli (Latin: "Castle of the Holy Angel").

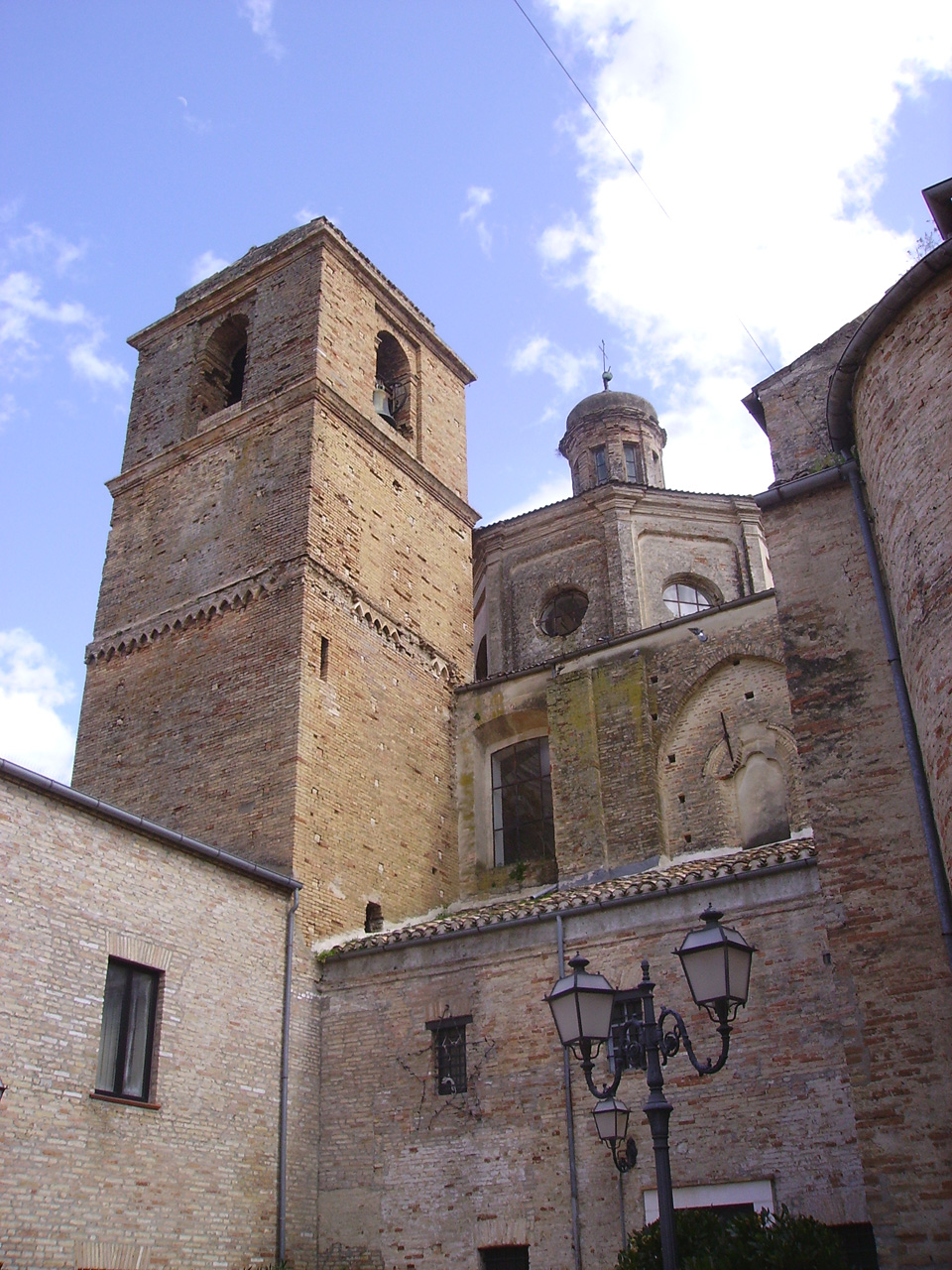
Church of San Francesco

However, around 400 CE, the first churches were established in the area between Città Sant'Angelo and Atri. The vestino-roman habitations, which would have been located in the nearby Salt Hill, were probably destroyed in the early Middle Ages, during the Gothic War (535–554); the Longobards (Lombards) who invaded Italy after the Gothic War, would likely have rebuilt the areas from scratch in their present locations, leaving as the trace of their later presence the veneration of the archangel Michael. Evidence of this veneration can be seen in both the local landmark and the municipal coat of arms.

The first official record of the municipality mentions a concession from the Emperor Ludovico II (Louis II of Italy) who granted a privilege to the Monastery of Casauria on the site called "CIVITATE S. ANGELI", where there was a castle and a port. This was dated 13 October 875.

In the 12th century the town was aggregated into Loreto County by the Normans who established the Kingdom of Sicily. It was a Guelph town, destroyed in 1240 by Boemondo Pissono, executioner to Frederick II, Holy Roman Emperor of the Hohenstaufen dynasty, and successor to the Normans as the King of Sicily, because the city was too loyal to his enemy, the Catholic Church. The city was rebuilt quickly and took the shape of a fortified nucleus inside a semicircle. The most prominent names were those of Zizza and Salomone. The arrival of the monastic orders in the first half of the 14th century generated widening interest and finally a monastery was established.

By 1528 the town was given its current name. In this era Città Sant'Angelo was one of the three major cities of the Penne-Atri diocese, along with the two bishopric sites. This rivalry often resulted in wars, especially for port control at the borders, with the current Silvi Marina and Pineto, in the province of Teramo. In the 16th century the town was aligned to the Castriota family, together with the lands of Spoltore, Moscufo and Montesilvano. It gradually became one of several feudal possessions, between the Carafa and the Piccolomini of Celano, who then gave it to the Pinelli.

Gradually an agrarian bourgeoisie firmly established itself through to the 17th century. On 18 February 1699 Lucrezia Camerlengo bought the Angola marquisate for her son Francesco Figliola from the Pinelli for 130,000 ducats. Francesco Figliola transformed the marquisate into a duchy.

Between 1300 and 1700, Città Sant'Angelo, despite numerous attacks by French and Spanish, enjoyed a period of prosperity. In the Treaty of Aix-la-Chapelle (1748) the city passed definitively to the Kingdom of Naples. Italy gained stability for the first time in the 18th century. The new territorial settlement and the accession of the peaceful Ferdinand VI of Spain allowed this peace settlement to last until the outbreak of the French Revolutionary Wars in 1792.

In March 1814, Città Sant'Angelo, together with the municipalities of Penne and Castiglione, formed the setting for the first ups and downs of Carboneria of the Italian Risorgimento, where Messer Raimondo and Penna Sant'Andrea were the protagonists. The revolt was repressed by the troops of Gioacchino Murat, led by General Florestano Pepe, thanks to the betrayal of a conspiracy and the turnaround by several municipalities that had pledged their support but eventually remained silent. The leaders of the uprising, Philip La Noce and Domenico Marulli, who came from Città Sant'Angelo, were shot at Penne and their heads were displayed on the main gate, Porta Sant'Angelo, though Michelangelo Castagna, another leader of the revolt, managed to escape, finding shelter with his sister in the town of Atri.

Before joining the Kingdom of Italy, Città Sant'Angelo was the administrative centre from 1837 to 1848 in the Distretto di Città Sant'Angelo, an administrative unit of Abruzzo Ulteriore Primo (the future Province of Teramo), a province of the Kingdom of the Two Sicilies. It returned to Penne County when the administrative centre was returned to Penne.

At the turn of the 20th century, many people left the region and joined a mass migration to the Americas.

During the Second World War, in April 1940 the Ministry of the Interior set up and rented the building of the Ex Manifattura Tabacchi, in the historic centre of the city, to serve as the only concentration camp of the province of Pescara, holding about 200 prisoners from Yugoslavia. The location remained active until April 1944. Currently, it hosts the Museum of Contemporary Art. On May 22, 1944, the US Air Force bombed the marina district; seventeen from Città Sant'Angelo lost their lives, in addition to German soldiers. On Monday, June 12, 1944 Città Sant'Angelo was liberated by the Allies.

Today, it is known for its historical architecture and as a tourist location that offers a variety of wine and cuisine.

== Main sights ==
Città Sant'Angelo is a member of the club "I Borghi più belli d'Italia". The entire centre is characterized by 18th-century brick houses. Sights include:

- The parish church of San Michele Arcangelo (Collegiate Church) of the 13th century, with stone portal of 1326, an interesting Nativity fresco in the attic, a 14th-century bell tower, and inside the choir wooden Baroque frescoes of the first half of the 15th century. It has a 48-metre-tall (157 ft) bell tower and houses remains of an early medieval pulpit from the 7th-8th centuries, as well as a portico and the tomb of bishop Amico di Buonamicizia, both from the 15th century.
- The Church of St. Francis, with a fine 14th-century portal of the Atri school; the interior was renovated in 1741.
- The Church of St. Augustine, with 18th-century stuccos by Terzani.
- The Church of St. Bernard, formerly a church of the Cistercian Riformati, whose monastery was erected later next to the church. Now Baroque, it has remnants of the old building on one side.
- The Church of St. Chiara, on a baroque circular plan with three chapels; stucco decorations by Carlo Piazzoli and Girolamo Rizza.
- Park Place Botanical Gardens, near the river.
- The Church of San Salvatore, an oratory.
- Astagno Palace, Brandimarte Palace, Ghiotti Palace and Ursini Palace.
- Museo Laboratorio d'Arte: housed in the old Manifattura Tabacchi.

== People ==
- Michelangelo Castagna (1783–1865), a leader of the Italian Carbonari, whose goal was a constitution for the Kingdom of the Two Sicilies, in 1814
- Felice Gasperi, footballer who died in Città Sant'Angelo in 1982
- Lino Grava, footballer who died in Città Sant'Angelo in 2010
- Massimo Oddo, World Cup-winning footballer
- Ruggero Pasquarelli, singer and actor in the Disney Channel original series Violetta and Soy Luna

== Twin towns ==
- (Italy) Nicolosi, Sicily, since 2001.

== Sport ==
The local football team is the Renato Curi Angolana, and currently plays in Eccellenza Abruzzo. The futsal club is Acqua e Sapone Calcio a 5, that played several years in Serie A.

== See also ==
- Abruzzo (wine)

== Sources ==
- Busk, M.M. (1836). Mediæval popes, emperors, kings, and crusaders; or, Germany, Italy, and Palestine from A.D. 1125 to A.D. 1268, Volume IV. London: Hookham & Sons.
- "Città Sant'Angelo, province of Pescara, Abruzzo, Italy". www.italyheritage.com.
- "Popolazione Residente al 1° Gennaio 2018". Istat. Retrieved 16 March 2019.
- Plinius Secundus, Gaius. Naturalis Historia (Book II 12.106).
- "Superficie di Comuni Province e Regioni italiane al 9 ottobre 2011". Istat. Retrieved 16 March 2019.
- "Visit Città Sant'Angelo - Città Sant'Angelo nella storia". www.visitacsa.it. Archived from the original on 2017-08-29.
