= San Nicola, Atri =

Church building in Atri, Italy

Coordinates: 42°34′49″N 13°58′27″E

San Nicola is a Romanesque-style, Roman Catholic church located in the town of Atri, province of Teramo, region of Abruzzo, Italy.

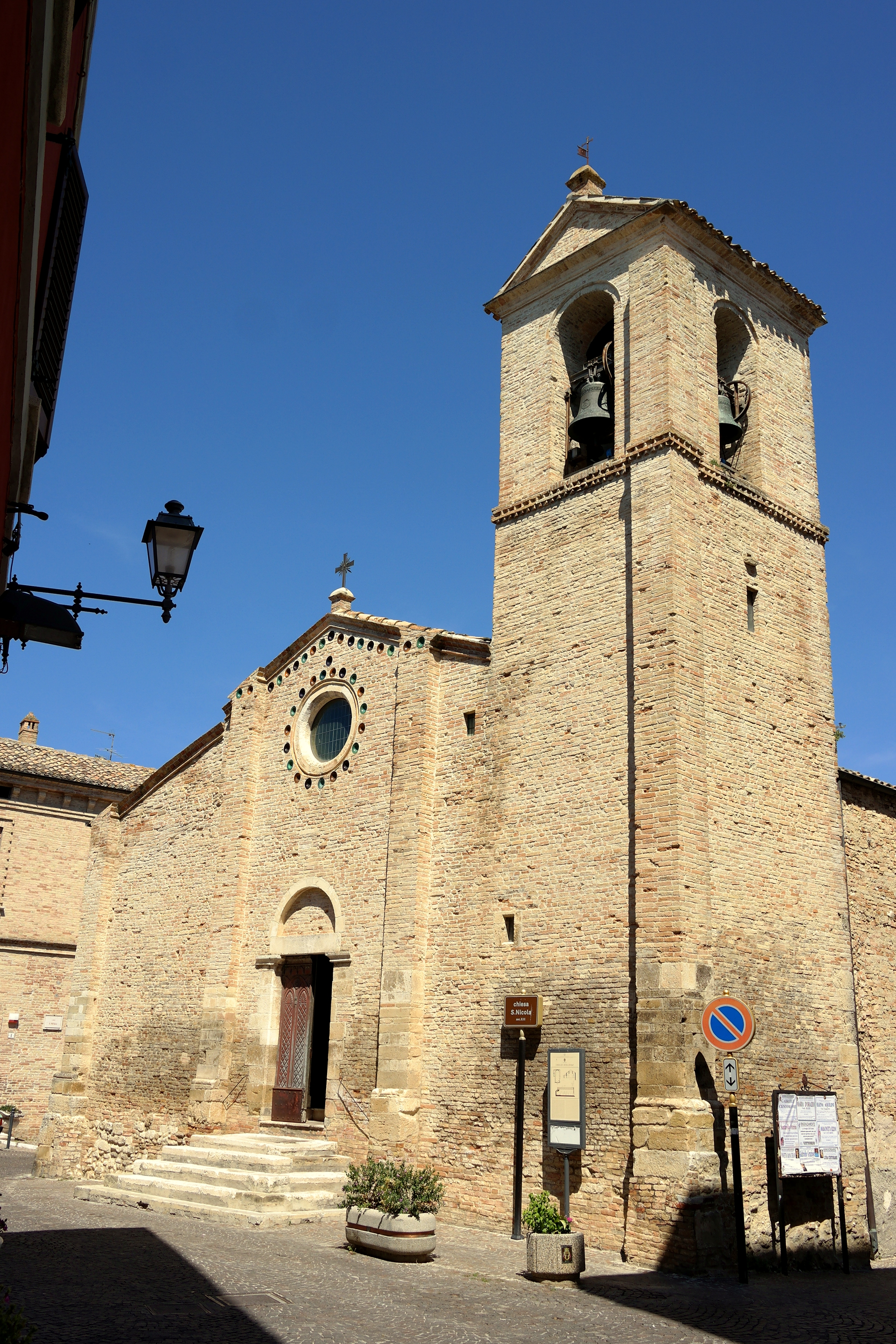
San Nicola Façade

== History ==
First founded in the 11th century and rebuilt in 1256, St Nicola’s Church was rebuilt over the centuries.

The front portal has a rounded arch. It is surmounted by a simple oculus and flanked by two rustic pilasters emerging from the brick facade. Internally the church with its three naves, separated by thick columns and three semicircular apses. A series of low pointed Gothic arches, as well as the short thick pillars, all belong to the 13th-century reconstruction. A fresco (circa 1440) by Andrea De Litio is painted above the baptismal font on the counterfacade, depicting the Madonna of Loreto among angels and Saints Roch and Sebastian.
