= Giambono di Corrado =

Italian painter

Giambono di Corrado (15th century) was an Italian painter.

== History ==
He was born in Dubrovnik but moved to Norcia, where he was adopted and was taught by Olivuccio di Ciccarello. Giambono was documented in Norcia in 1442, at work in the choir of Sant’Agostino with a group of painters, including Nicola di Ulisse from Siena; Luca di Lorenzo (Luca Alemanno) from Germany; Bartolomeo di Tommaso of Foligno; and Andrea de Litio.
