= Museo capitolare di Atri =

Museum of religious art in Atri, Italy

Coordinates: 42.5805°N 13.9797°E

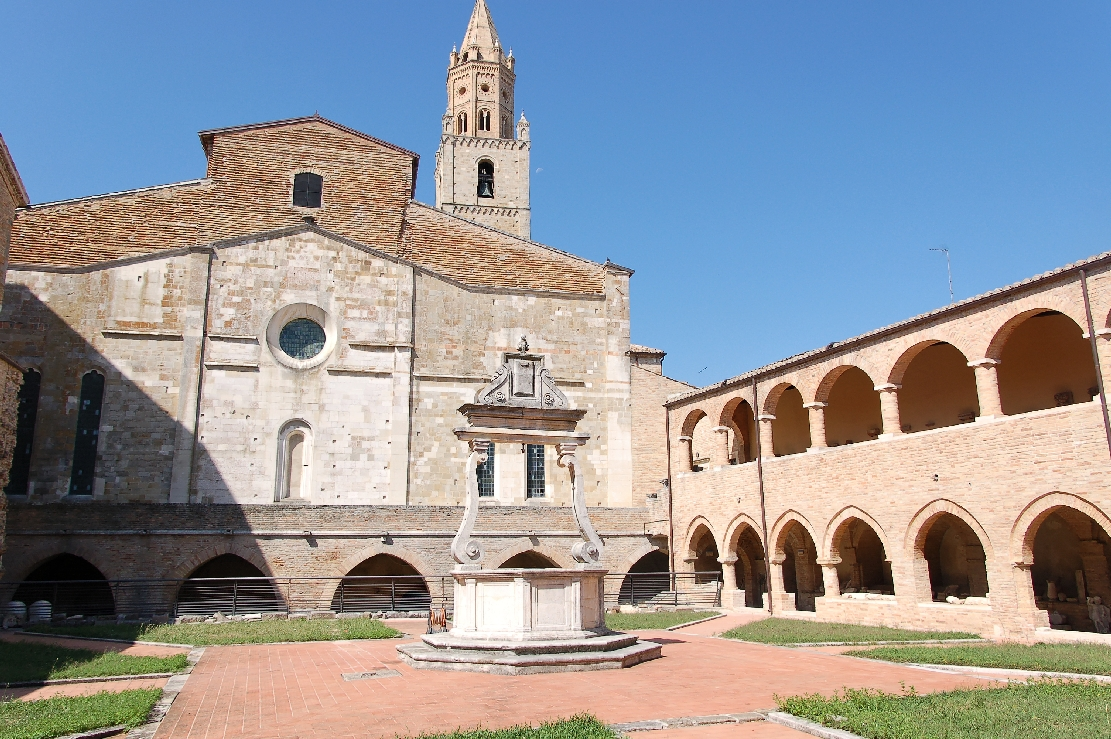
- Museo capitolare di Atri
- Location: Atri
- Type: Religious art
- Website: http://www.museocapitolareatri.it/

Museo capitolare di Atri (Italian for Chapter Museum of Atri) is a museum of religious art in Atri, Province of Teramo (Abruzzo).

== History ==
The Capitular Museum of Atri is one of the oldest museums in Abruzzo, founded in 1912. It was commissioned by Monsignor Raffaele Tini and was enriched by donations (such as ceramics from the Bindi family).

The museum is located in the upper rooms of the cloister of a Benedictine monastery from the 12th century, which in the 15th century became the residence of the cathedral canons and the episcopal cemetery. It comprises ten rooms in addition to the cloister and the crypt.

The museum houses works ranging from the 13th to the 20th century originating from the city.

== Collection ==
The museum's collection includes paintings from the 13th to the 20th century, including a detached fresco from the 13th–14th century, a Madonna attributed to Silvestro dell'Aquila dating between the 15th and 16th centuries, and a Madonna with Child by his pupil Carlo dell'Aquila, a triptych with sculptures by Tolmezzini from the early 16th century, a Madonna and Saints by Antonio Solario, a Nativity and a Flagellation attributed to Pedro de Aponte, and the Saints Francis and Leonard by Ippolito Borghesi, all from the 16th century, a Saint Reparata by Teodosio Ronci and Valerio Ronci dated 1605, a Madonna with Saints dated 1615 and attributed to Francesco Allegrini and the Cavalier d'Arpino, a Holy Family and Saints by Girolamo Cenatiempo from the 17th century, and six Scenes from the Life of Christ by Serafino Tamburelli from the 17th–18th century; more recent are three genre paintings by Tommaso Illuminati from the 20th century.

The sculpture collection includes works from the 13th–16th century, such as an altar screen of Saint James, attributed to the Moranzoni carvers' workshop (15th century), a terracotta Madonna with Child by Luca della Robbia from around 1470, a wooden angel by the museum's founder, Monsignor Tini, from 1931.

Of particular interest is the collection of manuscripts, including a missal, an antiphonary, and a lectionary from Abruzzo (13th century), the "Decree of Gratian" from the mid-14th century, the "Acquaviva Missal," and a collection of legal formularies from the 15th century.

One room houses the Bindi collection, with ceramics from the 16th to 20th centuries, including a Nativity and an Adoration by Francesco Saverio Grue from the 18th century.

The collection is completed by liturgical objects from the 16th to 18th centuries, including a series of bust-reliquaries and remains of a ambo from the 13th–14th century, sacred furnishings such as sacristy cabinets and a prie-dieu by the carver Carlo Riccione (17th century), textiles, and sacred vestments from the 17th and 18th centuries. Finally, there are liturgical objects in goldsmithing from the 12th to 20th centuries, including a rock crystal reliquary from the Venetian school of the 12th century.
