= Borgo Santa Maria Immacolata =

- Frazione
- Location of Borgo Santa Maria Immacolata in Italy
- Coordinates: 42°36′42″N 14°2′44″E
- Country: Italy
- Region: Abruzzo
- Province: Teramo (TE)
- Comune: Pineto

Population (2011)
  - Total: 2,491
- Time zone: UTC+1 (CET)
  - Summer (DST): UTC+2 (CEST)
- Postal code: 64025
- Dialing code: 085

Borgo Santa Maria Immacolata (lit. 'Village Holy Immaculate Mary') is a small town located west of Pineto, in the province of Teramo, Abruzzo, Italy. Its population amounted to 2,491 in 2011 (Istat census).
