= Torre San Rocco =

Coordinates: 42°37′54″N 14°01′18″E

- Frazione
- Interactive map of Torre San Rocco
- Country: Italy
- Region: Abruzzo
- Province: Teramo
- Time zone: UTC+1 (CET)
  - Summer (DST): UTC+2 (CEST)

Torre San Rocco is a frazione in the Province of Teramo in the Abruzzo region of Italy.
