= San Francesco, Atri =

Church in Teramo province, Italy

Coordinates: 42°34′48.7″N 13°58′36.5″E

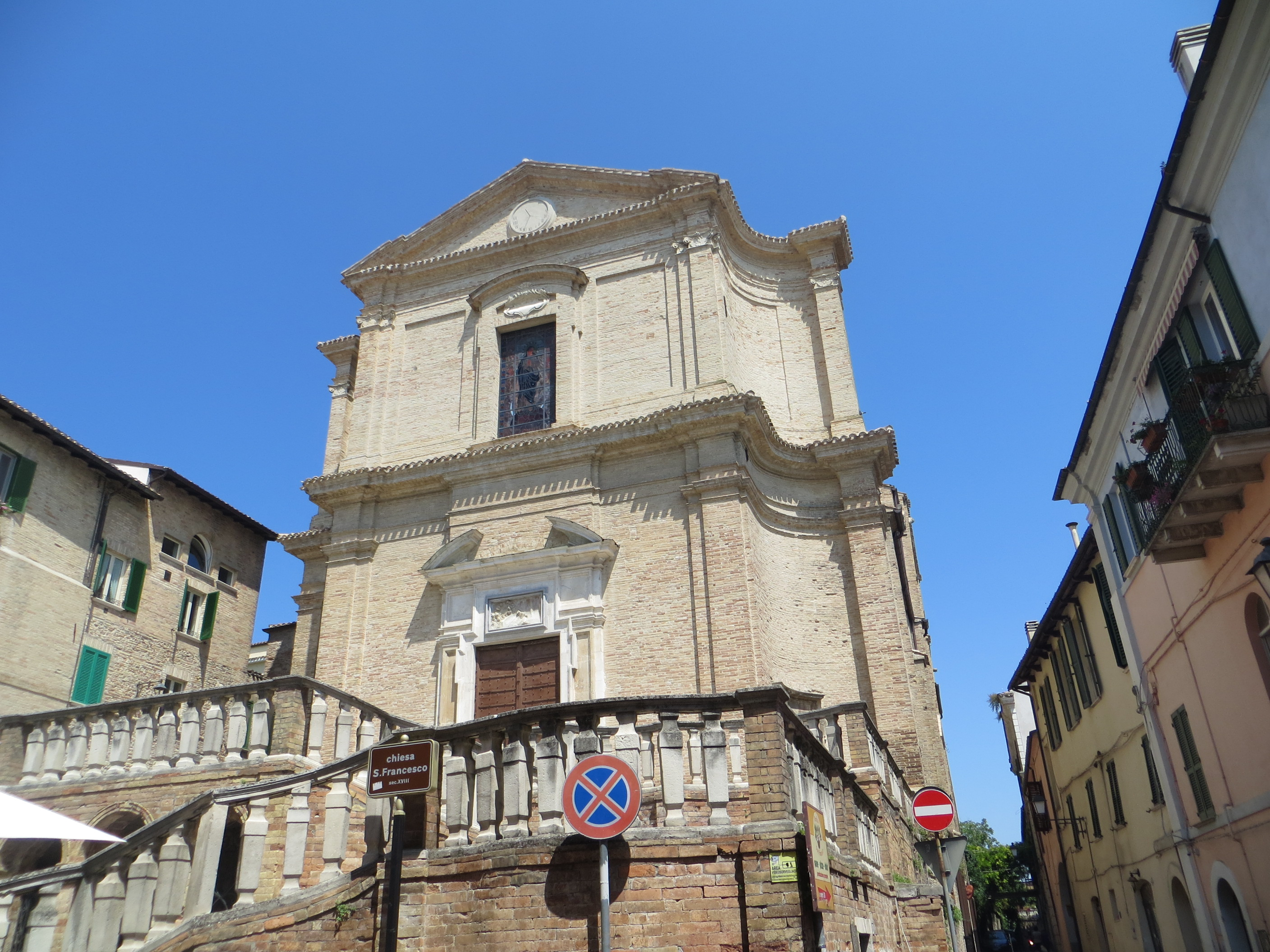
Atri - Chiesa di San Francesco.jpg

San Francesco is a Baroque architecture, Roman Catholic church in Atri, Province of Teramo, Region of Abruzzo, Italy.

== History ==
The first mention of the church is in documents from 1296. There are portions of the layout that date to the 13th-century, but most of the church was destroyed during an earthquake in 1688, and reconstruction began in 1715 using designs of Giovanni Battista Gianni, and was completed by 1760.
