= Atri, Abruzzo =

Atri
- Comune
- Comune di Atri
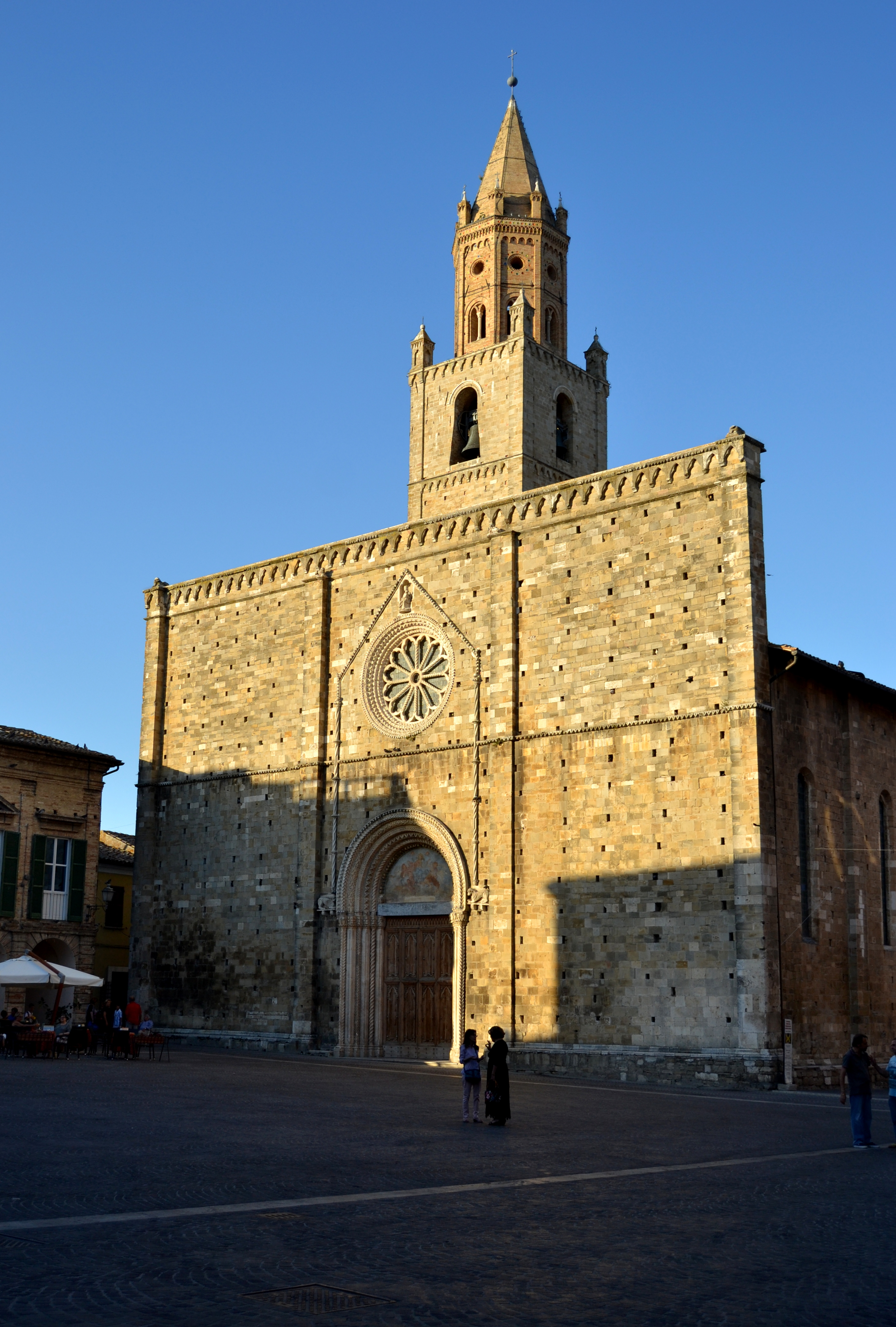
- Atri Cathedral

- Flag Coat of arms

- Location within Italy Location within Abruzzo
- Coordinates: 42°35′N 13°59′E
- Country: Italy
- Region: Abruzzo
- Province: Teramo (TE)
- Frazioni: Casoli, Fontanelle, S. Margherita, S. Giacomo, Treciminiere

Government
  - Mayor: Piergiorgio Ferretti (Per Atri)

Area
  - Total: 92.18 km^{2} (35.59 sq mi)
- Elevation: 442 m (1,450 ft)

Population (30 April 2017)
  - Total: 12,680
  - Density: 137.6/km^{2} (356.3/sq mi)
- Demonym: Atriani
- Time zone: UTC+1 (CET)
  - Summer (DST): UTC+2 (CEST)
- Postal code: 64032
- Dialing code: 085
- ISTAT code: 067004
- Patron saint: Santa Reparata di Cesarea di Palestina
- Saint day: Eight days after Easter
- Website: Official website

Atri (Ancient Greek: Ἀτρία (Átría); Latin: Adria, Atria, Hadria or Hatria) is a comune in the Province of Teramo in the Abruzzo region of Italy. Atri is the setting of the poem The Bell of Atri by American writer Henry Wadsworth Longfellow. Its name is the origin of the name of the Emperor Hadrian, whose family came from the town.

The closest airport is the Abruzzo Airport, which is approximately 22 miles away. The nearest beach is 7 miles to the east. The city hospital is Ospedale Civile S. Liberatore di Atri.

== History ==
=== Ancient history ===
Ancient Adria was a city of Picenum, situated about 10 kilometres (6 mi) from the Adriatic Sea, between the rivers Vomanus (modern Vomano) and Matrinus (modern Piomba). According to the Antonine Itinerary, it was distant 15 Roman miles from Castrum Novum (modern Giulianova) and 14 from Teate (modern Chieti). It has been supposed, with much probability, to be of Etruscan origin, and a colony from the more celebrated city of the name, now Adria in the Veneto region, though there is no historical evidence of the fact.

The first certain historical notice of Adria is the establishment of a Roman colony there about 282 BCE. In the early part of the Second Punic War (217 BCE) its territory was ravaged by Hannibal; but notwithstanding this calamity, it was one of the 18 Latin colonies which, in 209 BCE, were faithful to the cause of Rome, and willing to continue their contributions both of men and money. At a later period, according to the Liber de Coloniis, it must have received a fresh colony, probably under Augustus: hence it is termed a Colonia, both by Pliny and in inscriptions. One of these gives it the titles of Colonia Aelia Hadria, whence it would appear that it had been re-established by the emperor Hadrian, whose family was originally derived from hence. Hadrian was a native of Italica in Spain, a colony of Italian settlers in Hispania Baetica and his family was the gens Aelia.

The territory of Adria (ager Adrianus), though subsequently included in Picenum, appears to have originally formed a separate and independent district, bounded on the north by the river Vomanus (Vomano), and on the south by the Matrinus (la Piomba); at the mouth of this latter river was a town bearing the name of Matrinum, which served as the port of Adria; the city itself stood on a hill a few miles inland, on the same site still occupied by the modern Atri, a place of some consideration, with the title of a city, and the see of a bishop. Great part of the circuit of the ancient walls may be still traced, and mosaic pavements and other remains of buildings are also preserved. According to the Antonine Itinerary Adria (which may have been the original terminus of the Via Caecilia), was the point of junction of the Via Salaria and Via Valeria, a circumstance which probably contributed to its importance and flourishing condition under the Roman Empire.

=== Medieval history ===
After the fall of Rome, the region was subjected, along with most of northern and central Italy, to a long period of violent conflict. Ultimately, in the 6th century, the Lombards succeeded in establishing hegemony over the area, and Atri and other parts of Abruzzo found themselves annexed to the Duchy of Spoleto. In 1155, the city was sacked by the Norman Robert III of Loritello and remained in Norman hands, until after feuding between regional powers, it fell under the lordship of the House of Acquaviva family ruled the town for decades from about 1393, before merging their lands into the Kingdom of Naples, but remaining dominant in the city as Dukes of Atri until the 19th century. The rule of the Acquaivivas marked the highpoint of Atri's greatest power and splendor.

=== Ancient coinage ===
It is now generally admitted that the coins of Adria (with the legend "HAT" which at the time read, like other Osco-Italic languages, from right to left) belong to the city of Picenum, not that of the Veneto; but great difference of opinion has been entertained as to their age. They belong to the class commonly known as aes grave, and are even among the heaviest specimens known, exceeding in weight the most ancient Roman aeses. On this account they have been assigned to a very remote antiquity, some referring them to Etruscan settlers, others to the Greeks. But there seems much reason to believe that they are not really so ancient, and belong, in fact, to the Roman colony, which was founded previous to the general reduction of the Italian brass coinage.

== Name ==
According to the Comune of Atri, the city was founded between the 10th and 9th centuries BCE, first by the Sicels and Illyrians, and later by the Piceni.

Some think that the city Atri was named after the Illyrian god Hatranus (Hatrani). The ancient name has been also described as the source from which the Adriatic Sea derived its name. Others maintain that the sea was named for Adria, an Etruscan city in Veneto region.

It was also known as Hatria Piceni, to distinguish it from Hatria (Adria) in the Veneto.

== Main sights ==
- Duomo or Cathedral of Santa Maria Assunta: This 13th century church was built on the remains of an earlier Romanesque structure. The cathedral incorporates a 56-metre (184 ft) high campanile, or bell tower, and a cloister. It houses a fresco cycle by the 15th-century Abruzzi painter Andrea de Litio (or Delitio). The Diocesan museum is located adjacent to cathedral. The crypt was originally a large Roman cistern; another forms the foundation of the ducal palace; and in the eastern portion of the town there is a complicated system of underground passages for collecting and storing water.
- Palazzo Ducale of Atri: Palace of the Duke of Acquaviva, built on the highest point in the city. The Palazzo now houses offices of both the municipal and provincial (Teramo) governments.
- Medieval Walls and Gates: The three remaining gates in the walls are the Porta Macelli, the Porta San Domenico, and the Capo d'Atri.
- Museo Capitolare
- San Francesco: This church features a flight of stairs in the Baroque style.
- San Domenico: This church contains two 17th-century paintings by Giacomo Farelli.
- Sant'Agostino: 14th-century church.
- San Nicola
- Santa Chiara: 13th-century church.
- Santo Spirito: 12th to 18th century church.
- Sant'Andrea Apostolo: 14th century church.
- Fonte Pila and the Fonte della Strega.
- Roman Theater: These ruins still contain unexplored grottoes.
- Belvedere of Viale Vomano and of the public park "Villa Comunale dei Cappuccini di Atri" offer panoramas of the valleys and sea below.

== Villa Comunale dei Cappuccini ==
The municipal park of Atri is a green area of about 3 hectares (7 acres) close to the historic center. It was built on areas owned by the Duke and the canons of the cathedral, realized by Paul Odescalchi, bishop of Atri. It comprises artificial terraces (made before World War II) for about three hectares, in a pleasantly arid area.

The boulevards of the villa are about 600 metres (2,000 ft) long. The remaining viability inside of the park is closed to traffic, and it mainly comprises paths.

There are also caves, probably once used as stables by the Capuchin friars. Their origin, however, is expected to be much older, and, although there is now no connection to the historic center, it is probable that they were used to escape during pirate raids.

Close to the lookout over the sea and all of the valleys of the Terre del Cerrano (from Roseto degli Abruzzi up to Silvi Marina), there is a Liberty style fountain, considered the emblem of the Villa Comunale.

The eastern side of the Belvedere is erected over large walls, the ruins of an ancient fortress, once the summer palace of the local bishops.

Another symbol of the villa, renovated in the 1930s in an Italian garden, is the formaggione (the big cheese), a cylindrically shaped hedge, comprising conifers, with four entrances (located at the cardinal points). It represents the Garden of Secrets, a recurring element in many gardens of the castles and the noble villas of Italy, especially between the late 18th and early 19th century.

== Twin towns ==
- Conversano, Italy, since 17 June 2010
- Nardò, Italy, since 17 June 2010

== Gallery ==
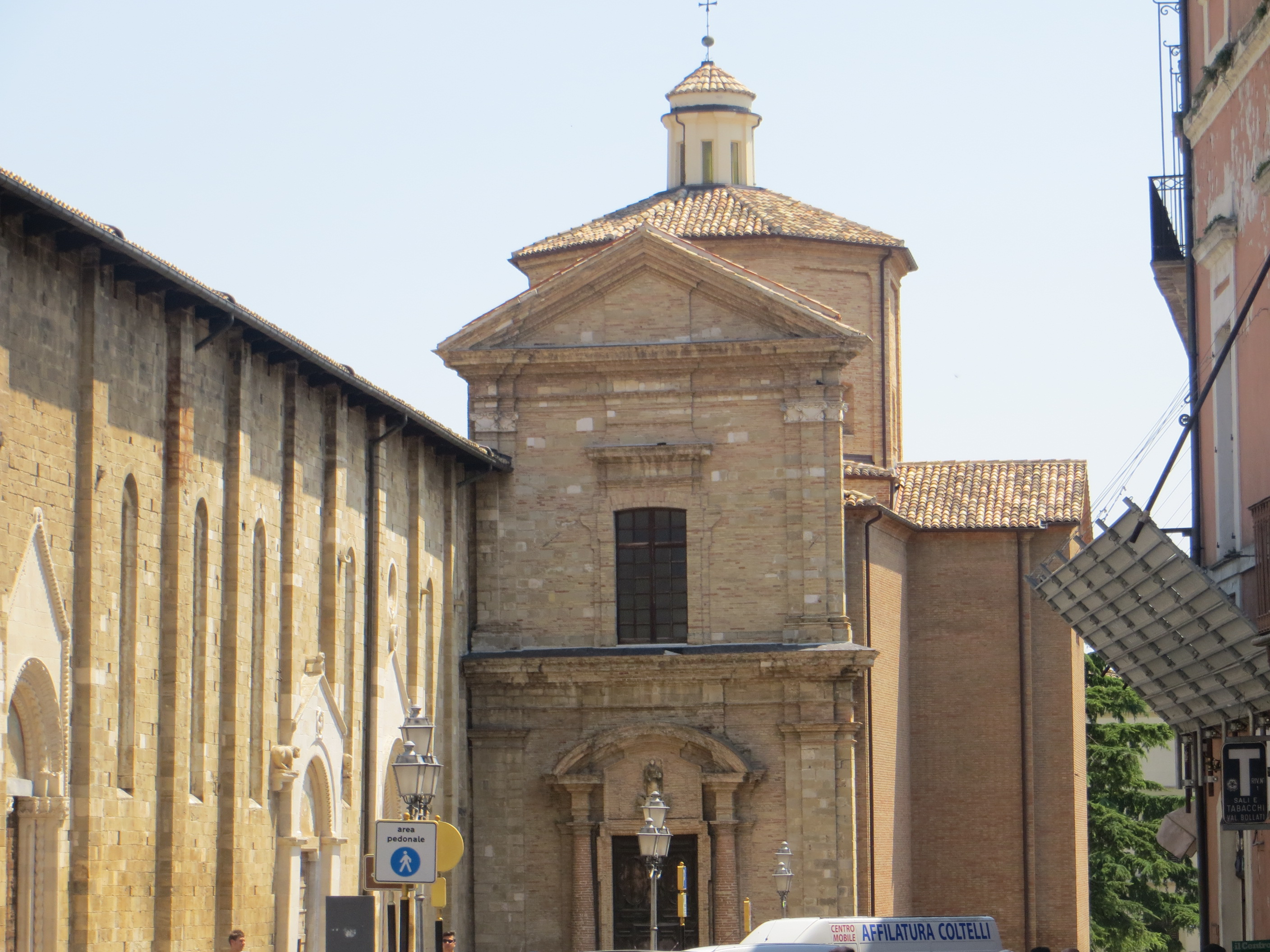
Church of Santa Reparata

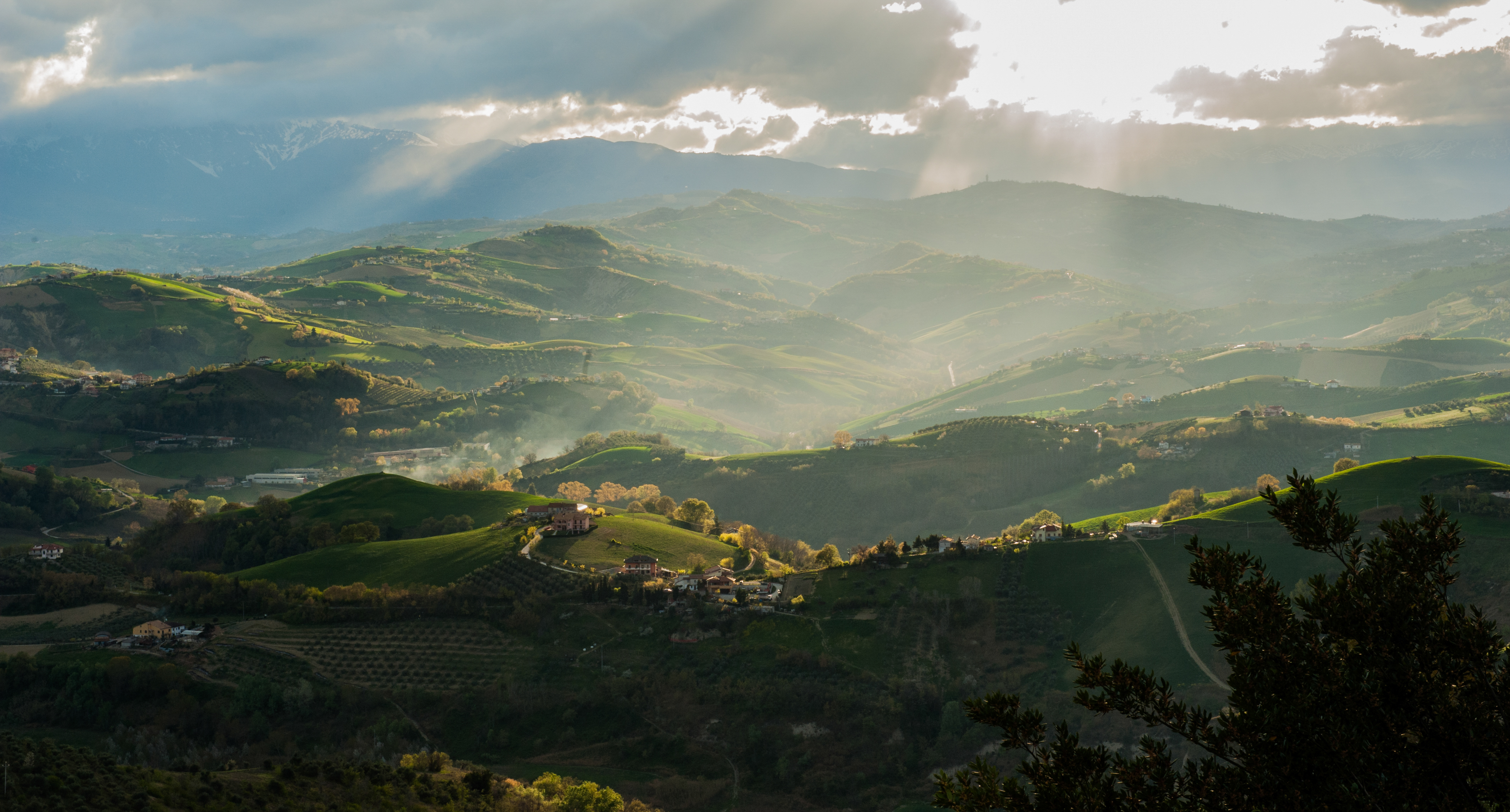
Calanchi nature reserve
