= Piomba =

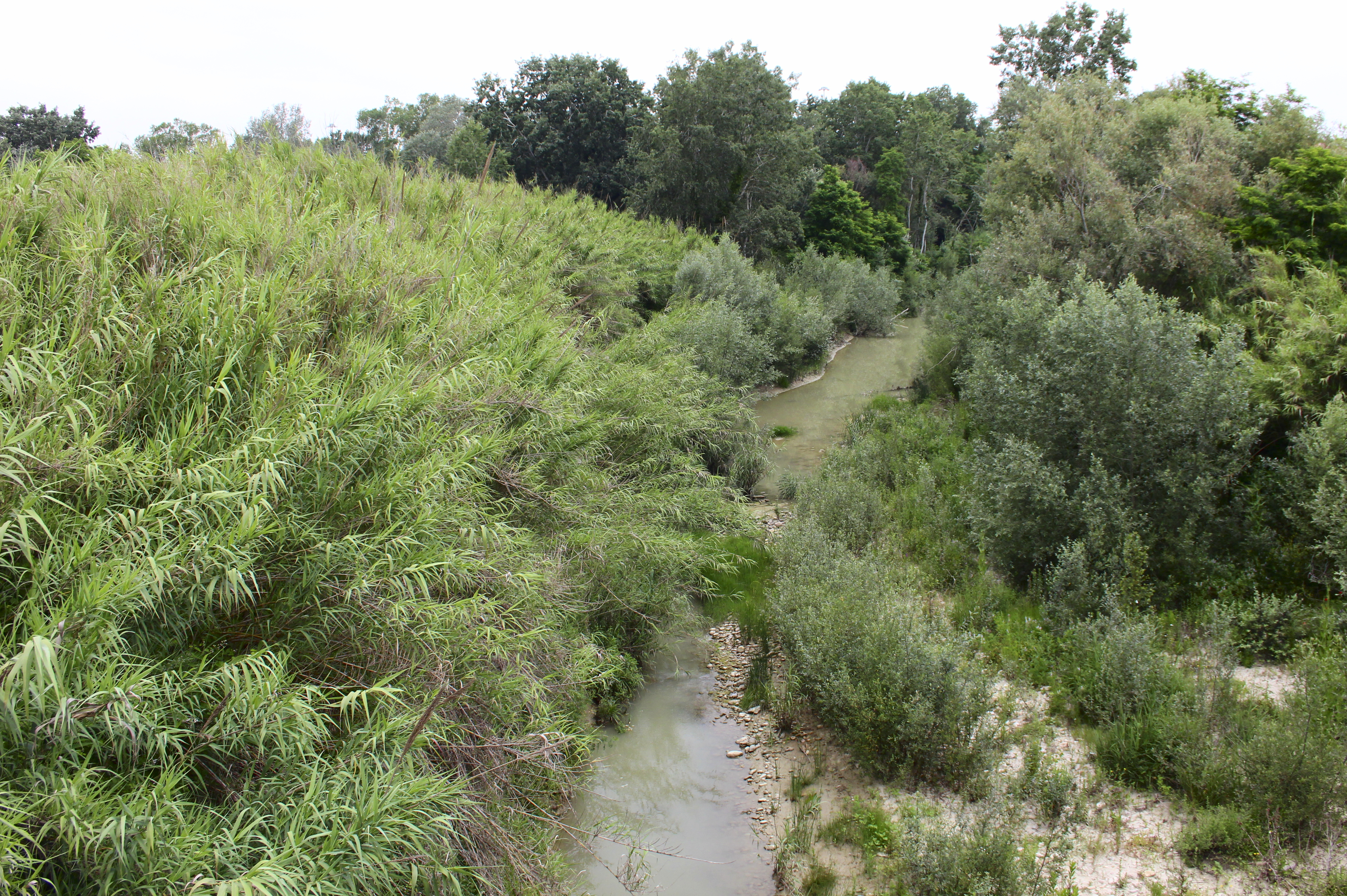

Location
- Country: Italy

Physical characteristics
- Source
  - location: Near Cermignano
- Mouth: Adriatic Sea
  - coordinates: 42.5306°N 14.1458°E

The Piomba is an Italian river in Abruzzo. The source of the river is near Cermignano in the province of Teramo. The river flows southeast past Cellino Attanasio before entering the province of Pescara. The river flows close to the border with Teramo before it enters the Adriatic Sea north of the mouth of the Saline and south of Silvi.

The Piomba has been identified as the ancient Matrinus.
