= Andrea de Litio =

Italian painter

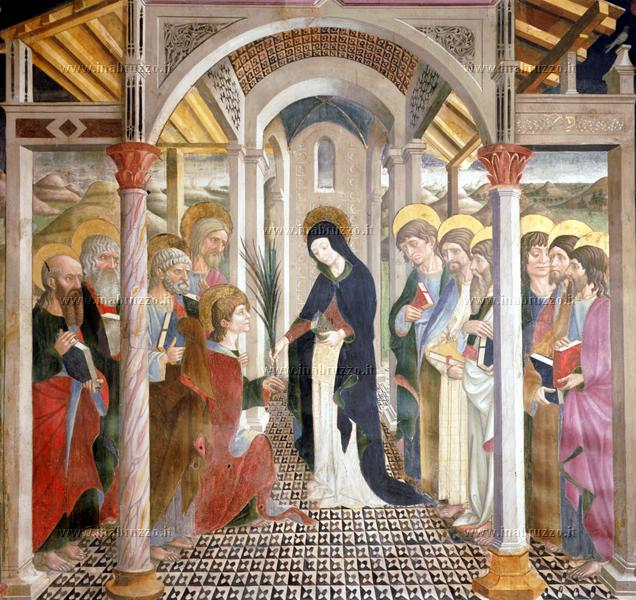

Andrea de Litio (active 1442–1473) was an Italian painter.

His city of birth is uncertain; one possibility is Lecce nei Marsi in the Province of L'Aquila in the Abruzzo. He was active mainly in the Abruzzo. Documents from 1442 have him working in Norcia as Andrea di Giovanni de Leccio, working alongside Luca di Lorenzo, Giambono di Corrado, Bartolomeo di Tommaso, and Nicola da Siena. His masterworks are frescoes in the choir of the canons in Atri Cathedral. These include a depiction of the evangelist Saint Luke as a painter. Other frescoes have primitive oddities: such as his depiction of The Massacre of the Innocents. He also painted for churches in Celano and frescoes for the church of San Nicola, Atri.
