= 1985 Giro d'Italia, Stage 11 to Stage 22 =

Cycling race stages

The 1985 Giro d'Italia was the 68th edition of the Giro d'Italia, one of cycling's Grand Tours. The Giro began in Verona, with a prologue individual time trial on 16 May, and Stage 11 occurred on 28 May with a stage from Paola. The race finished in Lucca on 9 June.

== Stage 11 ==
28 May 1985 — Paola to Salerno, 240 km (150 mi)

Stage 11 result

Rank	Rider	Team	Time
1	Stefano Allocchio (ITA)	Malvor–Bottecchia–Vaporella	6h 47' 48"
2	Giuseppe Saronni (ITA)	Del Tongo–Colnago	s.t.
3	Urs Freuler (SUI)	Atala	s.t.
4	Ezio Moroni (ITA)	Atala	s.t.
5	Sergio Scremin (ITA)	Vini Ricordi–Pinarello–Sidermec	s.t.
6	Silvestro Milani (ITA)	Malvor–Bottecchia–Vaporella	s.t.
7	Jens Veggerby (DEN)	Maggi Mobili–Fanini	s.t.
8	José Luis Navarro (ESP)	Zor–Gemeaz Cusin	s.t.
9	Bernard Hinault (FRA)	La Vie Claire	s.t.
10	Emanuele Bombini (ITA)	Del Tongo–Colnago	s.t.

General classification after Stage 11

Rank	Rider	Team	Time
1	Roberto Visentini (ITA)	Carrera–Inoxpran	59h 30' 12"
2	Bernard Hinault (FRA)	La Vie Claire	+ 28"
3	Marino Lejarreta (ESP)	Alpilatte–Olmo–Cierre	+ 1' 16"
4	Francesco Moser (ITA)	Gis Gelati	+ 1' 36"
5	Greg LeMond (USA)	La Vie Claire	+ 2' 09"
6	Silvano Contini (ITA)	Ariostea–Oece	+ 2' 33"
7	Gianbattista Baronchelli (ITA)	Supermercati Brianzoli	+ 2' 34"
8	Acácio da Silva (POR)	Malvor–Bottecchia–Vaporella	+ 2' 59"
9	Tommy Prim (SWE)	Sammontana–Bianchi	+ 3' 21"
10	Michael Wilson (AUS)	Alpilatte–Olmo–Cierre	+ 3' 44"

== Stage 12 ==
29 May 1985 — Capua to Maddaloni, 38 km (24 mi) (ITT)

Stage 12 result

Rank	Rider	Team	Time
1	Bernard Hinault (FRA)	La Vie Claire	46' 30"
2	Francesco Moser (ITA)	Gis Gelati	+ 53"
3	Greg LeMond (USA)	La Vie Claire	+ 58"
4	Tommy Prim (SWE)	Sammontana–Bianchi	+ 1' 00"
5	Franco Chioccioli (ITA)	Maggi Mobili–Fanini	+ 1' 12"
6	Roberto Visentini (ITA)	Carrera–Inoxpran	+ 1' 42"
7	Gianbattista Baronchelli (ITA)	Supermercati Brianzoli	+ 2' 02"
8	Michael Wilson (AUS)	Alpilatte–Olmo–Cierre	+ 2' 12"
9	Marco Giovannetti (ITA)	Ariostea–Oece	+ 2' 21"
10	Gerrie Knetemann (NED)	Skil–Sem–Kas–Miko	+ 2' 23"

General classification after Stage 12

Rank	Rider	Team	Time
1	Bernard Hinault (FRA)	La Vie Claire	60h 17' 10"
2	Roberto Visentini (ITA)	Carrera–Inoxpran	+ 1' 14"
3	Francesco Moser (ITA)	Gis Gelati	+ 2' 01"
4	Greg LeMond (USA)	La Vie Claire	+ 2' 39"
5	Tommy Prim (SWE)	Sammontana–Bianchi	+ 3' 53"
6	Gianbattista Baronchelli (ITA)	Supermercati Brianzoli	+ 4' 08"
7	Silvano Contini (ITA)	Ariostea–Oece	+ 4' 36"
8	Marino Lejarreta (ESP)	Alpilatte–Olmo–Cierre	+ 5' 01"
9	Michael Wilson (AUS)	Alpilatte–Olmo–Cierre	+ 5' 28"
10	Franco Chioccioli (ITA)	Maggi Mobili–Fanini	+ 5' 45"

== Stage 13 ==
30 May 1985 — Maddaloni to Frosinone, 154 km (96 mi)

Stage 13 result

Rank	Rider	Team	Time
1	Urs Freuler (SUI)	Atala	4h 02' 16"
2	Johan van der Velde (NED)	Vini Ricordi–Pinarello–Sidermec	s.t.
3	Frank Hoste (BEL)	Del Tongo–Colnago	s.t.
4	Ralf Hofeditz (FRG)	Skil–Sem–Kas–Miko	s.t.
5	Giovanni Mantovani (ITA)	Supermercati Brianzoli	s.t.
6	Pierino Gavazzi (ITA)	Atala	s.t.
7	Greg LeMond (USA)	La Vie Claire	s.t.
8	Patrizio Gambirasio (ITA)	Santini	s.t.
9	Peter Pieters (NED)	Zor–Gemeaz Cusin	s.t.
10	Davis Phinney (USA)	7-Eleven	s.t.

General classification after Stage 13

Rank	Rider	Team	Time
1	Bernard Hinault (FRA)	La Vie Claire	64h 19' 26"
2	Roberto Visentini (ITA)	Carrera–Inoxpran	+ 1' 14"
3	Francesco Moser (ITA)	Gis Gelati	+ 2' 01"
4	Greg LeMond (USA)	La Vie Claire	+ 2' 39"
5	Tommy Prim (SWE)	Sammontana–Bianchi	+ 3' 53"
6	Gianbattista Baronchelli (ITA)	Supermercati Brianzoli	+ 4' 08"
7	Silvano Contini (ITA)	Ariostea–Oece	+ 4' 36"
8	Marino Lejarreta (ESP)	Alpilatte–Olmo–Cierre	+ 5' 01"
9	Michael Wilson (AUS)	Alpilatte–Olmo–Cierre	+ 5' 28"
10	Franco Chioccioli (ITA)	Maggi Mobili–Fanini	+ 5' 45"

== Stage 14 ==
31 May 1985 — Frosinone to Gran Sasso d'Italia, 195 km (121 mi)

Stage 14 result

Rank	Rider	Team	Time
1	Franco Chioccioli (ITA)	Maggi Mobili–Fanini	5h 36' 46"
2	Michael Wilson (AUS)	Alpilatte–Olmo–Cierre	s.t.
3	Reynel Montoya (COL)	Varta–Café de Colombia–Mavic	+ 23"
4	Francesco Moser (ITA)	Gis Gelati	s.t.
5	Johan van der Velde (NED)	Vini Ricordi–Pinarello–Sidermec	s.t.
6	Greg LeMond (USA)	La Vie Claire	+ 26"
7	Acácio da Silva (POR)	Malvor–Bottecchia–Vaporella	s.t.
8	Marino Lejarreta (ESP)	Alpilatte–Olmo–Cierre	s.t.
9	Andrew Hampsten (USA)	7-Eleven	s.t.
10	Silvano Contini (ITA)	Ariostea–Oece	s.t.

General classification after Stage 14

Rank	Rider	Team	Time
1	Bernard Hinault (FRA)	La Vie Claire	69h 56' 44"
2	Roberto Visentini (ITA)	Carrera–Inoxpran	+ 1' 25"
3	Francesco Moser (ITA)	Gis Gelati	+ 1' 47"
4	Greg LeMond (USA)	La Vie Claire	+ 2' 33"
5	Gianbattista Baronchelli (ITA)	Supermercati Brianzoli	+ 4' 02"
6	Tommy Prim (SWE)	Sammontana–Bianchi	+ 4' 04"
7	Silvano Contini (ITA)	Ariostea–Oece	+ 4' 36"
8	Franco Chioccioli (ITA)	Maggi Mobili–Fanini	+ 4' 53"
9	Michael Wilson (AUS)	Alpilatte–Olmo–Cierre	+ 4' 55"
10	Marino Lejarreta (ESP)	Alpilatte–Olmo–Cierre	s.t.

== Stage 15 ==
1 June 1985 — L'Aquila to Perugia, 208 km (129 mi)

Stage 15 result

Rank	Rider	Team	Time
1	Ron Kiefel (USA)	7-Eleven	5h 22' 14"
2	Gerrie Knetemann (NED)	Skil–Sem–Kas–Miko	+ 2"
3	Francesco Moser (ITA)	Gis Gelati	s.t.
4	Johan van der Velde (NED)	Vini Ricordi–Pinarello–Sidermec	+ 3"
5	Greg LeMond (USA)	La Vie Claire	+ 4"
6	Acácio da Silva (POR)	Malvor–Bottecchia–Vaporella	s.t.
7	Andrew Hampsten (USA)	7-Eleven	s.t.
8	Harald Maier (AUT)	Gis Gelati	s.t.
9	Michael Wilson (AUS)	Alpilatte–Olmo–Cierre	s.t.
10	Claudio Chiappucci (ITA)	Carrera–Inoxpran	s.t.

General classification after Stage 15

Rank	Rider	Team	Time
1	Bernard Hinault (FRA)	La Vie Claire	75h 19' 02"
2	Roberto Visentini (ITA)	Carrera–Inoxpran	+ 1' 25"
3	Francesco Moser (ITA)	Gis Gelati	+ 1' 35"
4	Greg LeMond (USA)	La Vie Claire	+ 2' 33"
5	Gianbattista Baronchelli (ITA)	Supermercati Brianzoli	+ 4' 02"
6	Tommy Prim (SWE)	Sammontana–Bianchi	+ 4' 04"
7	Silvano Contini (ITA)	Ariostea–Oece	+ 4' 36"
8	Franco Chioccioli (ITA)	Maggi Mobili–Fanini	+ 4' 53"
9	Michael Wilson (AUS)	Alpilatte–Olmo–Cierre	+ 4' 55"
10	Marino Lejarreta (ESP)	Alpilatte–Olmo–Cierre	s.t.

== Stage 16 ==
2 June 1985 — Perugia to Cecina, 217 km (135 mi)

Stage 16 result

Rank	Rider	Team	Time
1	Giuseppe Saronni (ITA)	Del Tongo–Colnago	6h 00' 58"
2	Guido Bontempi (ITA)	Carrera–Inoxpran	s.t.
3	Davis Phinney (USA)	7-Eleven	s.t.
4	Silvano Riccò (ITA)	Dromedario–Laminox	s.t.
5	Ralf Hofeditz (FRG)	Skil–Sem–Kas–Miko	s.t.
6	Francesco Moser (ITA)	Gis Gelati	s.t.
7	Paolo Rosola (ITA)	Sammontana–Bianchi	s.t.
8	Franco Chioccioli (ITA)	Maggi Mobili–Fanini	s.t.
9	Gilbert Glaus (SUI)	Cilo–Aufina–Magniflex	s.t.
10	Stefano Allocchio (ITA)	Malvor–Bottecchia–Vaporella	s.t.

General classification after Stage 16

Rank	Rider	Team	Time
1	Bernard Hinault (FRA)	La Vie Claire	81h 20' 00"
2	Roberto Visentini (ITA)	Carrera–Inoxpran	+ 1' 25"
3	Francesco Moser (ITA)	Gis Gelati	+ 1' 35"
4	Greg LeMond (USA)	La Vie Claire	+ 2' 33"
5	Gianbattista Baronchelli (ITA)	Supermercati Brianzoli	+ 4' 02"
6	Tommy Prim (SWE)	Sammontana–Bianchi	+ 4' 04"
7	Silvano Contini (ITA)	Ariostea–Oece	+ 4' 36"
8	Franco Chioccioli (ITA)	Maggi Mobili–Fanini	+ 4' 53"
9	Michael Wilson (AUS)	Alpilatte–Olmo–Cierre	+ 4' 55"
10	Marino Lejarreta (ESP)	Alpilatte–Olmo–Cierre	s.t.

== Stage 17 ==
3 June 1985 — Cecina to Modena, 248 km (154 mi)

Stage 17 result

Rank	Rider	Team	Time
1	Daniel Gisiger (SUI)	Atala	6h 28' 12"
2	Giovanni Mantovani (ITA)	Supermercati Brianzoli	+ 7"
3	Erich Maechler (SUI)	Carrera–Inoxpran	+ 8"
4	Roberto Ceruti (ITA)	Del Tongo–Colnago	+ 24"
5	Romano Randi (ITA)	Alpilatte–Olmo–Cierre	+ 29"
6	Cesare Cipollini (ITA)	Maggi Mobili–Fanini	s.t.
7	Marco Vitali (ITA)	Del Tongo–Colnago	s.t.
8	Walter Magnago (ITA)	Gis Gelati	+ 31"
9	José Luis Navarro (ESP)	Zor–Gemeaz Cusin	s.t.
10	Filippo Piersanti (ITA)	Maggi Mobili–Fanini	+ 38"

General classification after Stage 17

Rank	Rider	Team	Time
1	Bernard Hinault (FRA)	La Vie Claire	87h 58' 11"
2	Francesco Moser (ITA)	Gis Gelati	+ 1' 35"
3	Greg LeMond (USA)	La Vie Claire	+ 2' 33"
4	Gianbattista Baronchelli (ITA)	Supermercati Brianzoli	+ 4' 02"
5	Tommy Prim (SWE)	Sammontana–Bianchi	+ 4' 04"
6	Silvano Contini (ITA)	Ariostea–Oece	+ 4' 36"
7	Franco Chioccioli (ITA)	Maggi Mobili–Fanini	+ 4' 53"
8	Michael Wilson (AUS)	Alpilatte–Olmo–Cierre	+ 4' 55"
9	Marino Lejarreta (ESP)	Alpilatte–Olmo–Cierre	s.t.
10	Alberto Volpi (ITA)	Sammontana–Bianchi	+ 6' 02"

== Rest day ==
4 June 1985

== Stage 18 ==
5 June 1985 — Monza to Domodossola, 128 km (80 mi)

Stage 18 result

Rank	Rider	Team	Time
1	Paolo Rosola (ITA)	Sammontana–Bianchi	3h 02' 23"
2	Urs Freuler (SUI)	Atala	s.t.
3	Giovanni Mantovani (ITA)	Supermercati Brianzoli	s.t.
4	Silvestro Milani (ITA)	Malvor–Bottecchia–Vaporella	s.t.
5	Pierino Gavazzi (ITA)	Atala	s.t.
6	Franco Chioccioli (ITA)	Maggi Mobili–Fanini	s.t.
7	Silvano Riccò (ITA)	Dromedario–Laminox	s.t.
8	Ralf Hofeditz (FRG)	Skil–Sem–Kas–Miko	s.t.
9	Johan van der Velde (NED)	Vini Ricordi–Pinarello–Sidermec	s.t.
10	Frank Hoste (BEL)	Del Tongo–Colnago	s.t.

General classification after Stage 18

Rank	Rider	Team	Time
1	Bernard Hinault (FRA)	La Vie Claire	91h 00' 34"
2	Francesco Moser (ITA)	Gis Gelati	+ 1' 35"
3	Greg LeMond (USA)	La Vie Claire	+ 2' 33"
4	Gianbattista Baronchelli (ITA)	Supermercati Brianzoli	+ 4' 02"
5	Tommy Prim (SWE)	Sammontana–Bianchi	+ 4' 04"
6	Silvano Contini (ITA)	Ariostea–Oece	+ 4' 36"
7	Franco Chioccioli (ITA)	Maggi Mobili–Fanini	+ 4' 53"
8	Michael Wilson (AUS)	Alpilatte–Olmo–Cierre	+ 4' 55"
9	Marino Lejarreta (ESP)	Alpilatte–Olmo–Cierre	s.t.
10	Alberto Volpi (ITA)	Sammontana–Bianchi	+ 6' 02"

== Stage 19 ==
6 June 1985 — Domodossola to Saint-Vincent, 247 km (153 mi)

Stage 19 result

Rank	Rider	Team	Time
1	Francesco Moser (ITA)	Gis Gelati	6h 28' 28"
2	Johan van der Velde (NED)	Vini Ricordi–Pinarello–Sidermec	s.t.
3	Franco Chioccioli (ITA)	Maggi Mobili–Fanini	s.t.
4	Giuseppe Saronni (ITA)	Del Tongo–Colnago	s.t.
5	Alberto Volpi (ITA)	Sammontana–Bianchi	s.t.
6	Michael Wilson (AUS)	Alpilatte–Olmo–Cierre	s.t.
7	Mario Beccia (ITA)	Malvor–Bottecchia–Vaporella	s.t.
8	Silvano Riccò (ITA)	Dromedario–Laminox	s.t.
9	Davide Cassani (ITA)	Santini	s.t.
10	Emanuele Bombini (ITA)	Del Tongo–Colnago	s.t.

General classification after Stage 19

Rank	Rider	Team	Time
1	Bernard Hinault (FRA)	La Vie Claire	97h 29' 02"
2	Francesco Moser (ITA)	Gis Gelati	+ 1' 15"
3	Greg LeMond (USA)	La Vie Claire	+ 2' 33"
4	Gianbattista Baronchelli (ITA)	Supermercati Brianzoli	+ 4' 02"
5	Tommy Prim (SWE)	Sammontana–Bianchi	+ 4' 04"
6	Silvano Contini (ITA)	Ariostea–Oece	+ 4' 36"
7	Franco Chioccioli (ITA)	Maggi Mobili–Fanini	+ 4' 43"
8	Michael Wilson (AUS)	Alpilatte–Olmo–Cierre	+ 4' 55"
9	Marino Lejarreta (ESP)	Alpilatte–Olmo–Cierre	s.t.
10	Alberto Volpi (ITA)	Sammontana–Bianchi	+ 6' 02"

== Stage 20 ==
7 June 1985 — Saint-Vincent to Valnontey di Cogne, 58 km (36 mi)

Stage 20 result

Rank	Rider	Team	Time
1	Andrew Hampsten (USA)	7-Eleven	1h 30' 51"
2	Reynel Montoya (COL)	Varta–Café de Colombia–Mavic	+ 1' 00"
3	Marino Lejarreta (ESP)	Alpilatte–Olmo–Cierre	+ 1' 04"
4	Rafael Acevedo (COL)	Varta–Café de Colombia–Mavic	+ 1' 14"
5	Greg LeMond (USA)	La Vie Claire	+ 1' 18"
6	Johan van der Velde (NED)	Vini Ricordi–Pinarello–Sidermec	+ 1' 22"
7	Michael Wilson (AUS)	Alpilatte–Olmo–Cierre	+ 1' 30"
8	José Luis Navarro (ESP)	Zor–Gemeaz Cusin	+ 1' 35"
9	Lucien Van Impe (BEL)	Santini	+ 1' 37"
10	Bernard Hinault (FRA)	La Vie Claire	s.t.

General classification after Stage 20

Rank	Rider	Team	Time
1	Bernard Hinault (FRA)	La Vie Claire	99h 01' 30"
2	Francesco Moser (ITA)	Gis Gelati	+ 1' 15"
3	Greg LeMond (USA)	La Vie Claire	+ 2' 14"
4	Marino Lejarreta (ESP)	Alpilatte–Olmo–Cierre	+ 4' 12"
5	Tommy Prim (SWE)	Sammontana–Bianchi	+ 4' 18"
6	Silvano Contini (ITA)	Ariostea–Oece	+ 4' 36"
7	Michael Wilson (AUS)	Alpilatte–Olmo–Cierre	+ 4' 38"
8	Gianbattista Baronchelli (ITA)	Supermercati Brianzoli	+ 4' 59"
9	Franco Chioccioli (ITA)	Maggi Mobili–Fanini	+ 5' 51"
10	Mario Beccia (ITA)	Malvor–Bottecchia–Vaporella	+ 6' 45"

== Stage 21 ==
8 June 1985 — Saint-Vincent to Genoa, 229 km (142 mi)

Stage 21 result

Rank	Rider	Team	Time
1	Urs Freuler (SUI)	Atala	5h 45' 17"
2	Paolo Rosola (ITA)	Sammontana–Bianchi	s.t.
3	Davis Phinney (USA)	7-Eleven	s.t.
4	Johan van der Velde (NED)	Vini Ricordi–Pinarello–Sidermec	s.t.
5	Frank Hoste (BEL)	Del Tongo–Colnago	s.t.
6	Roberto Pagnin (ITA)	Malvor–Bottecchia–Vaporella	s.t.
7	Pierino Gavazzi (ITA)	Atala	s.t.
8	Domenico Cavallo (ITA)	Zor–Gemeaz Cusin	s.t.
9	Francesco Moser (ITA)	Gis Gelati	s.t.
10	Marc Gomez (FRA)	La Vie Claire	s.t.

General classification after Stage 21

Rank	Rider	Team	Time
1	Bernard Hinault (FRA)	La Vie Claire	104h 46' 47"
2	Francesco Moser (ITA)	Gis Gelati	+ 1' 15"
3	Greg LeMond (USA)	La Vie Claire	+ 2' 14"
4	Marino Lejarreta (ESP)	Alpilatte–Olmo–Cierre	+ 4' 12"
5	Tommy Prim (SWE)	Sammontana–Bianchi	+ 4' 18"
6	Silvano Contini (ITA)	Ariostea–Oece	+ 4' 36"
7	Gianbattista Baronchelli (ITA)	Supermercati Brianzoli	+ 4' 59"
8	Michael Wilson (AUS)	Alpilatte–Olmo–Cierre	+ 5' 37"
9	Franco Chioccioli (ITA)	Maggi Mobili–Fanini	+ 5' 51"
10	Mario Beccia (ITA)	Malvor–Bottecchia–Vaporella	+ 6' 45"

== Stage 22 ==
9 June 1985 — Lido di Camaiore to Lucca, 48 km (30 mi) (ITT)

Stage 22 result

Rank	Rider	Team	Time
1	Francesco Moser (ITA)	Gis Gelati	59' 57"
2	Bernard Hinault (FRA)	La Vie Claire	+ 7"
3	Tommy Prim (SWE)	Sammontana–Bianchi	+ 42"
4	Greg LeMond (USA)	La Vie Claire	+ 48"
5	Gianbattista Baronchelli (ITA)	Supermercati Brianzoli	+ 1' 40"
6	Michael Wilson (AUS)	Alpilatte–Olmo–Cierre	+ 2' 18"
7	Marino Lejarreta (ESP)	Alpilatte–Olmo–Cierre	+ 2' 25"
8	Urs Freuler (SUI)	Atala	+ 2' 31"
9	Alberto Volpi (ITA)	Sammontana–Bianchi	+ 2' 41"
10	Giuseppe Saronni (ITA)	Del Tongo–Colnago	+ 2' 46"

General classification after Stage 22

Rank	Rider	Team	Time
1	Bernard Hinault (FRA)	La Vie Claire	105h 46' 51"
2	Francesco Moser (ITA)	Gis Gelati	+ 1' 08"
3	Greg LeMond (USA)	La Vie Claire	+ 2' 55"
4	Tommy Prim (SWE)	Sammontana–Bianchi	+ 4' 53"
5	Marino Lejarreta (ESP)	Alpilatte–Olmo–Cierre	+ 6' 30"
6	Gianbattista Baronchelli (ITA)	Supermercati Brianzoli	+ 6' 32"
7	Silvano Contini (ITA)	Ariostea–Oece	+ 7' 22"
8	Michael Wilson (AUS)	Alpilatte–Olmo–Cierre	+ 7' 38"
9	Franco Chioccioli (ITA)	Maggi Mobili–Fanini	+ 8' 33"
10	Alberto Volpi (ITA)	Sammontana–Bianchi	+ 10' 31"
