= 1986 Giro d'Italia, Stage 12 to Stage 22 =

Cycling race stages

The 1986 Giro d'Italia was the 69th edition of the Giro d'Italia, one of cycling's Grand Tours. The Giro began in Palermo, with a prologue individual time trial on 12 May, and Stage 12 occurred on 23 May with a stage from Sinalunga. The race finished in Merano on 2 June.

== Stage 12 ==
23 May 1986 — Sinalunga to Siena, 46 km (29 mi) (ITT)

Stage 12 result

Rank	Rider	Team	Time
1	Lech Piasecki (POL)	Del Tongo	59' 04"
2	Roberto Visentini (ITA)	Carrera Jeans–Vagabond	+ 7"
3	Giuseppe Saronni (ITA)	Del Tongo	+ 30"
4	Dietrich Thurau (FRG)	Supermercati Brianzoli	+ 37"
5	Greg LeMond (USA)	La Vie Claire	+ 40"
6	Steve Bauer (CAN)	La Vie Claire	+ 57"
7	Enrico Grimani (ITA)	Magniflex–Centroscarpa	s.t.
8	Michael Wilson (AUS)	Ecoflam–Jollyscarpe–BFB Bruciatori–Alfa Lum	+ 58"
9	Tommy Prim (SWE)	Sammontana–Bianchi	+ 1' 12"
10	Francesco Moser (ITA)	Supermercati Brianzoli	+ 1' 20"

General classification after Stage 12

Rank	Rider	Team	Time
1	Giuseppe Saronni (ITA)	Del Tongo	54h 22' 49"
2	Gianbattista Baronchelli (ITA)	Supermercati Brianzoli	+ 1' 18"
3	Roberto Visentini (ITA)	Carrera Jeans–Vagabond	+ 1' 31"
4	Steve Bauer (CAN)	La Vie Claire	+ 2' 41"
5	Francesco Moser (ITA)	Supermercati Brianzoli	+ 2' 50"
6	Michael Wilson (AUS)	Ecoflam–Jollyscarpe–BFB Bruciatori–Alfa Lum	+ 3' 09"
7	Acácio da Silva (POR)	Malvor–Bottecchia–Vaporella	+ 3' 29"
8	Greg LeMond (USA)	La Vie Claire	+ 3' 47"
9	Claudio Corti (ITA)	Supermercati Brianzoli	+ 4' 28"
10	Flavio Giupponi (ITA)	Del Tongo	s.t.

== Stage 13 ==
24 May 1986 — Siena to Sarzana, 175 km (109 mi)

Stage 13 result

Rank	Rider	Team	Time
1	Jean-Paul van Poppel (NED)	Skala–Skil–Gazelle	4h 45' 52"
2	Guido Bontempi (ITA)	Carrera Jeans–Vagabond	s.t.
3	Eric Vanderaerden (BEL)	Panasonic–Merckx–Agu	s.t.
4	Stefano Allocchio (ITA)	Malvor–Bottecchia–Vaporella	s.t.
5	Frank Hoste (BEL)	Fagor	s.t.
6	Paolo Rosola (ITA)	Sammontana–Bianchi	s.t.
7	Adriano Baffi (ITA)	Gis Gelati	s.t.
8	Daniele Asti (ITA)	Magniflex–Centroscarpa	s.t.
9	Johan van der Velde (NED)	Panasonic–Merckx–Agu	s.t.
10	Domenico Cavallo (ITA)	Ariostea–Gres	s.t.

General classification after Stage 13

Rank	Rider	Team	Time
1	Giuseppe Saronni (ITA)	Del Tongo	59h 08' 31"
2	Gianbattista Baronchelli (ITA)	Supermercati Brianzoli	+ 1' 18"
3	Roberto Visentini (ITA)	Carrera Jeans–Vagabond	+ 1' 31"
4	Francesco Moser (ITA)	Supermercati Brianzoli	+ 2' 50"
5	Michael Wilson (AUS)	Ecoflam–Jollyscarpe–BFB Bruciatori–Alfa Lum	+ 3' 09"
6	Steve Bauer (CAN)	La Vie Claire	+ 3' 21"
7	Acácio da Silva (POR)	Malvor–Bottecchia–Vaporella	+ 3' 29"
8	Greg LeMond (USA)	La Vie Claire	+ 3' 47"
9	Claudio Corti (ITA)	Supermercati Brianzoli	+ 4' 28"
10	Flavio Giupponi (ITA)	Del Tongo	s.t.

== Stage 14 ==
25 May 1986 — Savona to Sauze d'Oulx, 236 km (147 mi)

Stage 14 result

Rank	Rider	Team	Time
1	Martin Earley (IRL)	Fagor	6h 17' 24"
2	Stefano Giuliani (ITA)	Supermercati Brianzoli	+ 20"
3	Pedro Muñoz (ESP)	Fagor	+ 21"
4	Roberto Visentini (ITA)	Carrera Jeans–Vagabond	+ 29"
5	Greg LeMond (USA)	La Vie Claire	s.t.
6	Claudio Corti (ITA)	Supermercati Brianzoli	+ 35"
7	Giuseppe Saronni (ITA)	Del Tongo	+ 45"
8	Francesco Moser (ITA)	Supermercati Brianzoli	s.t.
9	Alberto Volpi (ITA)	Sammontana–Bianchi	s.t.
10	Franco Chioccioli (ITA)	Ecoflam–Jollyscarpe–BFB Bruciatori–Alfa Lum	+ 51"

General classification after Stage 14

Rank	Rider	Team	Time
1	Giuseppe Saronni (ITA)	Del Tongo	65h 26' 40"
2	Roberto Visentini (ITA)	Carrera Jeans–Vagabond	+ 1' 10"
3	Gianbattista Baronchelli (ITA)	Supermercati Brianzoli	+ 1' 51"
4	Francesco Moser (ITA)	Supermercati Brianzoli	+ 2' 50"
5	Greg LeMond (USA)	La Vie Claire	+ 3' 31"
6	Michael Wilson (AUS)	Ecoflam–Jollyscarpe–BFB Bruciatori–Alfa Lum	+ 3' 35"
7	Acácio da Silva (POR)	Malvor–Bottecchia–Vaporella	+ 4' 09"
8	Claudio Corti (ITA)	Supermercati Brianzoli	+ 4' 18"
9	Alfio Vandi (ITA)	Ariostea–Gres	+ 5' 37"
10	Flavio Giupponi (ITA)	Del Tongo	+ 5' 41"

== Stage 15 ==
26 May 1986 — Sauze d'Oulx to Erba, 260 km (160 mi)

Stage 15 result

Rank	Rider	Team	Time
1	Dag Erik Pedersen (NOR)	Ariostea–Gres	7h 15' 12"
2	Stephen Roche (IRL)	Carrera Jeans–Vagabond	s.t.
3	Emanuele Bombini (ITA)	Vini Ricordi–Pinarello–Sidermec	+ 18"
4	Gerhard Zadrobilek (AUT)	Supermercati Brianzoli	s.t.
5	Roberto Pagnin (ITA)	Malvor–Bottecchia–Vaporella	+ 30"
6	Riccardo Magrini (ITA)	Vini Ricordi–Pinarello–Sidermec	s.t.
7	Johan van der Velde (NED)	Panasonic–Merckx–Agu	s.t.
8	Mauro Longo (ITA)	Malvor–Bottecchia–Vaporella	s.t.
9	Jean-René Bernaudeau (FRA)	Fagor	s.t.
10	Salvatore Cavallaro (ITA)	Atala–Ofmega	s.t.

General classification after Stage 15

Rank	Rider	Team	Time
1	Giuseppe Saronni (ITA)	Del Tongo	72h 42' 48"
2	Roberto Visentini (ITA)	Carrera Jeans–Vagabond	+ 1' 10"
3	Gianbattista Baronchelli (ITA)	Supermercati Brianzoli	+ 1' 51"
4	Francesco Moser (ITA)	Supermercati Brianzoli	+ 2' 50"
5	Greg LeMond (USA)	La Vie Claire	+ 3' 31"
6	Michael Wilson (AUS)	Ecoflam–Jollyscarpe–BFB Bruciatori–Alfa Lum	+ 3' 35"
7	Acácio da Silva (POR)	Malvor–Bottecchia–Vaporella	+ 4' 09"
8	Claudio Corti (ITA)	Supermercati Brianzoli	+ 4' 18"
9	Alfio Vandi (ITA)	Ariostea–Gres	+ 5' 37"
10	Flavio Giupponi (ITA)	Del Tongo	+ 5' 41"

== Stage 16 ==
27 May 1986 — Erba to Foppolo, 143 km (89 mi)

Stage 16 result

Rank	Rider	Team	Time
1	Pedro Muñoz (ESP)	Fagor	4h 20' 21"
2	Greg LeMond (USA)	La Vie Claire	+ 9"
3	Roberto Visentini (ITA)	Carrera Jeans–Vagabond	+ 20"
4	Claudio Corti (ITA)	Supermercati Brianzoli	+ 31"
5	Franco Chioccioli (ITA)	Ecoflam–Jollyscarpe–BFB Bruciatori–Alfa Lum	+ 43"
6	Gianbattista Baronchelli (ITA)	Supermercati Brianzoli	+ 1' 23"
7	Niki Rüttimann (SWI)	La Vie Claire	+ 1' 29"
8	Francesco Moser (ITA)	Supermercati Brianzoli	+ 2' 24"
9	Stefano Colagè (ITA)	Dromedario–Fibok–Laminox	+ 2' 26"
10	Giuseppe Saronni (ITA)	Del Tongo	s.t.

General classification after Stage 16

Rank	Rider	Team	Time
1	Roberto Visentini (ITA)	Carrera Jeans–Vagabond	77h 04' 29"
2	Giuseppe Saronni (ITA)	Del Tongo	+ 1' 04"
3	Gianbattista Baronchelli (ITA)	Supermercati Brianzoli	+ 1' 54"
4	Greg LeMond (USA)	La Vie Claire	+ 2' 05"
5	Claudio Corti (ITA)	Supermercati Brianzoli	+ 3' 24"
6	Francesco Moser (ITA)	Supermercati Brianzoli	+ 3' 54"
7	Franco Chioccioli (ITA)	Ecoflam–Jollyscarpe–BFB Bruciatori–Alfa Lum	+ 5' 21"
8	Marco Giovannetti (ITA)	Gis Gelati	+ 7' 39"
9	Niki Rüttimann (SWI)	La Vie Claire	+ 8' 20"
10	Acácio da Silva (POR)	Malvor–Bottecchia–Vaporella	+ 8' 48"

== Stage 17 ==
28 May 1986 — Foppolo to Piacenza, 196 km (122 mi)

Stage 17 result

Rank	Rider	Team	Time
1	Guido Bontempi (ITA)	Carrera Jeans–Vagabond	4h 51' 53"
2	Eric Vanderaerden (BEL)	Panasonic–Merckx–Agu	s.t.
3	Stefano Allocchio (ITA)	Malvor–Bottecchia–Vaporella	s.t.
4	Adriano Baffi (ITA)	Gis Gelati	s.t.
5	Paolo Rosola (ITA)	Sammontana–Bianchi	s.t.
6	Johan van der Velde (NED)	Panasonic–Merckx–Agu	s.t.
7	Frank Hoste (BEL)	Fagor	s.t.
8	Patrizio Gambirasio (ITA)	Santini	s.t.
9	Urs Freuler (SUI)	Atala–Ofmega	s.t.
10	Emanuele Bombini (ITA)	Vini Ricordi–Pinarello–Sidermec	s.t.

General classification after Stage 17

Rank	Rider	Team	Time
1	Roberto Visentini (ITA)	Carrera Jeans–Vagabond	81h 56' 22"
2	Giuseppe Saronni (ITA)	Del Tongo	+ 1' 06"
3	Greg LeMond (USA)	La Vie Claire	+ 2' 05"
4	Claudio Corti (ITA)	Supermercati Brianzoli	+ 3' 24"
5	Francesco Moser (ITA)	Supermercati Brianzoli	+ 3' 54"
6	Franco Chioccioli (ITA)	Ecoflam–Jollyscarpe–BFB Bruciatori–Alfa Lum	+ 5' 21"
7	Marco Giovannetti (ITA)	Gis Gelati	+ 7' 39"
8	Niki Rüttimann (SWI)	La Vie Claire	+ 8' 20"
9	Acácio da Silva (POR)	Malvor–Bottecchia–Vaporella	+ 8' 48"
10	Pedro Muñoz (ESP)	Fagor	+ 8' 52"

== Stage 18 ==
29 May 1986 — Piacenza to Cremona, 36 km (22 mi) (ITT)

Stage 18 result

Rank	Rider	Team	Time
1	Francesco Moser (ITA)	Supermercati Brianzoli	43' 51"
2	Dietrich Thurau (FRG)	Supermercati Brianzoli	+ 49"
3	Jesper Worre (DEN)	Santini	+ 1' 05"
4	Tommy Prim (SWE)	Sammontana–Bianchi	+ 1' 09"
5	Giuseppe Saronni (ITA)	Del Tongo	+ 1' 16"
6	Roberto Visentini (ITA)	Carrera Jeans–Vagabond	+ 1' 20"
7	Marco Giovannetti (ITA)	Gis Gelati	+ 1' 23"
8	Acácio da Silva (POR)	Malvor–Bottecchia–Vaporella	+ 1' 24"
9	Lech Piasecki (POL)	Del Tongo	+ 1' 29"
10	Guido Bontempi (ITA)	Carrera Jeans–Vagabond	s.t.

General classification after Stage 18

Rank	Rider	Team	Time
1	Roberto Visentini (ITA)	Carrera Jeans–Vagabond	82h 41' 40"
2	Giuseppe Saronni (ITA)	Del Tongo	+ 1' 02"
3	Francesco Moser (ITA)	Supermercati Brianzoli	+ 2' 14"
4	Greg LeMond (USA)	La Vie Claire	+ 2' 26"
5	Claudio Corti (ITA)	Supermercati Brianzoli	+ 4' 18"
6	Franco Chioccioli (ITA)	Ecoflam–Jollyscarpe–BFB Bruciatori–Alfa Lum	+ 6' 37"
7	Marco Giovannetti (ITA)	Gis Gelati	+ 7' 43"
8	Acácio da Silva (POR)	Malvor–Bottecchia–Vaporella	+ 8' 52"
9	Michael Wilson (AUS)	Ecoflam–Jollyscarpe–BFB Bruciatori–Alfa Lum	+ 9' 20"
10	Niki Rüttimann (SWI)	La Vie Claire	+ 10' 44"

== Stage 19 ==
30 May 1986 — Cremona to Peio, 211 km (131 mi)

Stage 19 result

Rank	Rider	Team	Time
1	Johan van der Velde (NED)	Panasonic–Merckx–Agu	5h 45' 19"
2	Ennio Salvador (ITA)	Gis Gelati	+ 7"
3	Emanuele Bombini (ITA)	Vini Ricordi–Pinarello–Sidermec	+ 10"
4	Stephen Roche (IRL)	Carrera Jeans–Vagabond	+ 32"
5	Alessandro Paganessi (ITA)	Sammontana–Bianchi	s.t.
6	Roberto Pagnin (ITA)	Malvor–Bottecchia–Vaporella	+ 1' 21"
7	Greg LeMond (USA)	La Vie Claire	+ 1' 39"
8	Giuseppe Saronni (ITA)	Del Tongo	s.t.
9	Roberto Visentini (ITA)	Carrera Jeans–Vagabond	s.t.
10	Francesco Moser (ITA)	Supermercati Brianzoli	s.t.

General classification after Stage 19

Rank	Rider	Team	Time
1	Roberto Visentini (ITA)	Carrera Jeans–Vagabond	88h 28' 38"
2	Giuseppe Saronni (ITA)	Del Tongo	+ 1' 02"
3	Francesco Moser (ITA)	Supermercati Brianzoli	+ 2' 14"
4	Greg LeMond (USA)	La Vie Claire	+ 2' 26"
5	Claudio Corti (ITA)	Supermercati Brianzoli	+ 4' 49"
6	Franco Chioccioli (ITA)	Ecoflam–Jollyscarpe–BFB Bruciatori–Alfa Lum	+ 6' 58"
7	Marco Giovannetti (ITA)	Gis Gelati	+ 8' 03"
8	Acácio da Silva (POR)	Malvor–Bottecchia–Vaporella	+ 8' 56"
9	Emanuele Bombini (ITA)	Vini Ricordi–Pinarello–Sidermec	+ 10' 49"
10	Niki Rüttimann (SWI)	La Vie Claire	+ 10' 54"

== Stage 20 ==
31 May 1986 — Peio to Bassano del Grappa, 179 km (111 mi)

Stage 20 result

Rank	Rider	Team	Time
1	Guido Bontempi (ITA)	Carrera Jeans–Vagabond	4h 26' 50"
2	Paolo Rosola (ITA)	Sammontana–Bianchi	s.t.
3	Stefano Allocchio (ITA)	Malvor–Bottecchia–Vaporella	s.t.
4	Flavio Chesini (ITA)	Magniflex–Centroscarpa	s.t.
5	Eric Vanderaerden (BEL)	Panasonic–Merckx–Agu	s.t.
6	Silvano Riccò (ITA)	Dromedario–Fibok–Laminox	s.t.
7	Johan van der Velde (NED)	Panasonic–Merckx–Agu	s.t.
8	Frank Hoste (BEL)	Fagor	s.t.
9	Patrick Serra (SWE)	Ariostea–Gres	s.t.
10	Adriano Baffi (ITA)	Gis Gelati	s.t.

General classification after Stage 20

Rank	Rider	Team	Time
1	Roberto Visentini (ITA)	Carrera Jeans–Vagabond	92h 55' 28"
2	Giuseppe Saronni (ITA)	Del Tongo	+ 1' 02"
3	Francesco Moser (ITA)	Supermercati Brianzoli	+ 2' 14"
4	Greg LeMond (USA)	La Vie Claire	+ 2' 26"
5	Claudio Corti (ITA)	Supermercati Brianzoli	+ 4' 49"
6	Franco Chioccioli (ITA)	Ecoflam–Jollyscarpe–BFB Bruciatori–Alfa Lum	+ 6' 58"
7	Marco Giovannetti (ITA)	Gis Gelati	+ 8' 03"
8	Acácio da Silva (POR)	Malvor–Bottecchia–Vaporella	+ 8' 56"
9	Emanuele Bombini (ITA)	Vini Ricordi–Pinarello–Sidermec	+ 10' 49"
10	Niki Rüttimann (SWI)	La Vie Claire	+ 10' 54"

== Stage 21 ==
1 June 1986 — Bassano del Grappa to Bolzano, 234 km (145 mi)

Stage 21 result

Rank	Rider	Team	Time
1	Acácio da Silva (POR)	Malvor–Bottecchia–Vaporella	6h 56' 27"
2	Niki Rüttimann (SWI)	La Vie Claire	s.t.
3	Alessandro Paganessi (ITA)	Sammontana–Bianchi	+ 3"
4	Pedro Muñoz (ESP)	Fagor	+ 13"
5	Dietrich Thurau (FRG)	Supermercati Brianzoli	+ 51"
6	Primož Čerin (YUG)	Malvor–Bottecchia–Vaporella	s.t.
7	Roberto Pagnin (ITA)	Malvor–Bottecchia–Vaporella	+ 1' 24"
8	Ezio Moroni (ITA)	Atala–Ofmega	s.t.
9	Johan van der Velde (NED)	Panasonic–Merckx–Agu	s.t.
10	Stefano Colagè (ITA)	Dromedario–Fibok–Laminox	s.t.

General classification after Stage 21

Rank	Rider	Team	Time
1	Roberto Visentini (ITA)	Carrera Jeans–Vagabond	99h 51' 55"
2	Giuseppe Saronni (ITA)	Del Tongo	+ 1' 02"
3	Francesco Moser (ITA)	Supermercati Brianzoli	+ 2' 14"
4	Greg LeMond (USA)	La Vie Claire	+ 2' 26"
5	Claudio Corti (ITA)	Supermercati Brianzoli	+ 4' 49"
6	Franco Chioccioli (ITA)	Ecoflam–Jollyscarpe–BFB Bruciatori–Alfa Lum	+ 6' 58"
7	Acácio da Silva (POR)	Malvor–Bottecchia–Vaporella	+ 7' 12"
8	Marco Giovannetti (ITA)	Gis Gelati	+ 8' 03"
9	Niki Rüttimann (SWI)	La Vie Claire	+ 9' 15"
10	Pedro Muñoz (ESP)	Fagor	+ 11' 52"

== Stage 22 ==
2 June 1986 — Merano to Merano, 108.6 km (67.5 mi)

Stage 22 result

Rank	Rider	Team	Time
1	Eric Van Lancker (BEL)	Panasonic–Merckx–Agu	2h 39' 19"
2	Giovanni Bottoia (ITA)	Supermercati Brianzoli	+ 1' 09"
3	Pierangelo Bincoletto (ITA)	Malvor–Bottecchia–Vaporella	s.t.
4	Kjell Nilsson (SWE)	Ariostea–Gres	s.t.
5	Jürg Bruggmann (SUI)	Cilo–Aufina–Gemeaz Cusin	s.t.
6	Sergio Santimaria (ITA)	Ariostea–Gres	s.t.
7	Jean-René Bernaudeau (FRA)	Fagor	s.t.
8	Eric Vanderaerden (BEL)	Panasonic–Merckx–Agu	s.t.
9	Stefano Colagè (ITA)	Dromedario–Fibok–Laminox	s.t.
10	Paolo Rosola (ITA)	Sammontana–Bianchi	s.t.

General classification after Stage 22

Rank	Rider	Team	Time
1	Roberto Visentini (ITA)	Carrera Jeans–Vagabond	102h 33' 56"
2	Giuseppe Saronni (ITA)	Del Tongo	+ 1' 02"
3	Francesco Moser (ITA)	Supermercati Brianzoli	+ 2' 14"
4	Greg LeMond (USA)	La Vie Claire	+ 2' 26"
5	Claudio Corti (ITA)	Supermercati Brianzoli	+ 4' 49"
6	Franco Chioccioli (ITA)	Ecoflam–Jollyscarpe–BFB Bruciatori–Alfa Lum	+ 6' 58"
7	Acácio da Silva (POR)	Malvor–Bottecchia–Vaporella	+ 7' 12"
8	Marco Giovannetti (ITA)	Gis Gelati	+ 8' 03"
9	Niki Rüttimann (SWI)	La Vie Claire	+ 9' 15"
10	Pedro Muñoz (ESP)	Fagor	+ 11' 52"
