= 1986 Giro d'Italia =

Race details
- Dates: 12 May – 2 June 1986
- Stages: 22 + Prologue
- Distance: 3,858.6 km (2,397.6 mi)
- Winning time: 102h 33' 55"

Results
Jersey awarded to the overall winner	Winner	Roberto Visentini (ITA)	(Carrera Jeans–Vagabond)
	Second	Giuseppe Saronni (ITA)	(Del Tongo-Colnago)
	Third	Francesco Moser (ITA)	(Supermercati Brianzoli-Essebi)
Jersey awarded to the points classification winner	Points	Guido Bontempi (ITA)	(Carrera Jeans)
Jersey awarded to the mountains classification winner	Mountains	Pedro Muñoz (ESP)	(Fagor)
Jersey awarded to the youth classification winner	Youth	Marco Giovannetti (ITA)	(Gis Gelati-Oece)
	Team	Supermercati Brianzoli-Essebi	

The 1986 Giro d'Italia was the 69th running of the Giro d'Italia. The cycling race started in Palermo, on 12 May, with a 1 km (0.6 mi) prologue and concluded in Merano, on 2 June, with a 108.6 km (67.5 mi) mass-start stage. A total of 171 riders from nineteen teams entered the 22-stage race, that was won by Italian Roberto Visentini of the Carrera Jeans–Vagabond team. The second and third places were taken by Italian riders Giuseppe Saronni and Francesco Moser, respectively.

Swiss rider Urs Freuler was the first rider to wear the race leader's maglia rosa (English: pink jersey). The race lead was passed between five riders across the first five days of racing. Saronni gained the overall lead after the conclusion of the sixth stage and maintained an advantage through the fifteenth day of racing. As the race crossed several Alpine passes in the sixteenth stage, Visentini gained the race lead due to his strong performance on the stage. Visentini then defended the race lead until the race's conclusion on 2 June.

Amongst the other classifications that the race awarded, Guido Bontempi of Carrera Jeans–Vagabond won the points classification, Pedro Muñoz of Fagor won the mountains classification, and Gis Gelati-Oece's Marco Giovannetti completed the Giro as the best neo-professional in the general classification, finishing eighth overall. Supermercati Brianzoli finishing as the winners of the team classification, ranking each of the twenty teams contesting the race by lowest cumulative time.

== Teams ==
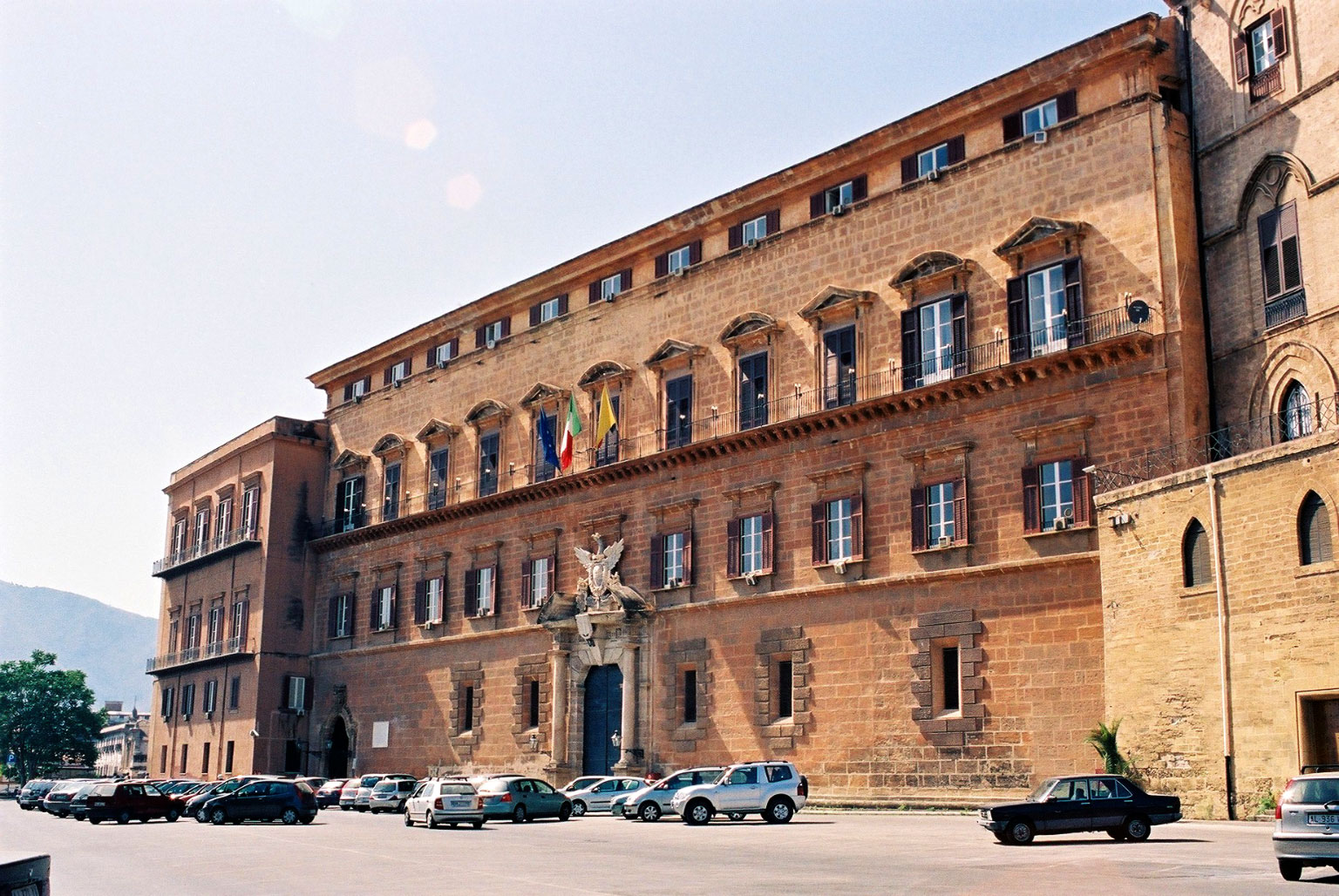
The team presentation ceremony took place on 11 May at the Palazzo dei Normanni in Palermo.

Twenty-two teams were invited by the race organizers to participate in the 1986 edition of the Giro d'Italia. The presentation of the teams – where each team's roster and manager are introduced in front the media and local dignitaries – took place at the Palazzo dei Normanni on 11 May. The starting riders came from a total of 19 different countries; Italy (103), the Netherlands (13), and Switzerland (10) all had 10 or more riders. Each team sent a squad of nine riders, which meant that the race started with a peloton of 171 cyclists.

Of those starting, 58 were riding the Giro d'Italia for the first time. The average age of riders was 26.46 years, ranging from 20–year–old Roy Knickman (La Vie Claire) to 37–year–old Hennie Kuiper (Skala-Skil). The team with the youngest average rider age was Magniflex-Centroscarpa (23), while the oldest was Supermercati Brianzoli-Essebi (29). From those that started, 143 of them reached the finish line in Merano.

The teams entering the race were:

- Ariostea-Gres
- Atala-Ofmega
- Carrera Jeans–Vagabond
- Cilo-Aufina-Gemeaz Cusin
- Del Tongo-Colnago
- Dromedario-Laminox-Fibok
- Ecoflam-Jollyscarpe-BFB Bruc.
- Fagor
- Gis Gelati-Oece
- La Vie Claire
- Magniflex-Centroscarpa
- Malvor-Bottecchia-Vaporella
- Murella-Fanini
- Panasonic–Merckx–Agu
- Sammontana-Bianchi
- Santini-Cierre
- Skala-Skil
- Supermercati Brianzoli-Essebi
- Vini Ricordi-Pinarello

== Pre-race favorites ==
The starting peloton did not include the 1985 winner, Bernard Hinault. An El Mundo Deportivo writer believed LeMond, Moser, and Saronni to be the favorites to win the overall crown. In addition, the writer felt that Pedro Muñoz had the best chances to win the race, out of all the Spanish riders entering the event. Atala-Ofmega sports director Franco Criblori believed that Saronni's results would depend on what form he could maintain in the mountains. In addition, Criblori thought Dutchman Johan van der Velde and Swiss rider Niki Rüttimann were two foreigners to consider for a high place in the general classification.

== Route and stages ==
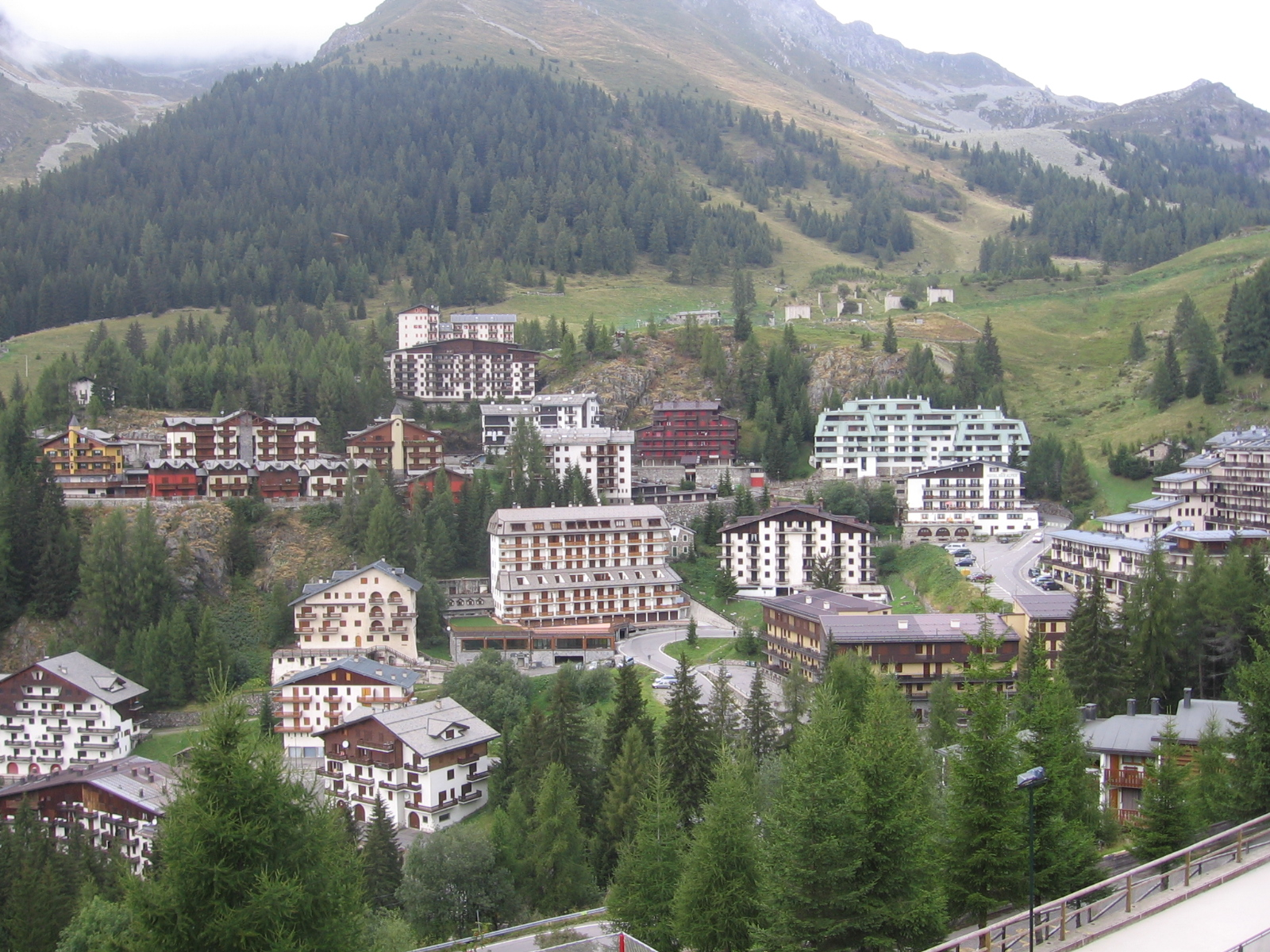
Foppolo hosted the end of the 143 km (89 mi) sixteenth stage and the start of the 186 km (116 mi) seventeenth stage.

The route for the 1986 edition of the Giro d'Italia was revealed to the public on television by head organizer Vincenzo Torriani on 8 February 1986. It contained four time trials, three of which were individual and one of which was a team event. There were twelve stages containing categorized climbs, of which three had summit finishes: stage 14, to Sauze d'Oulx; stage 16, to Foppolo; and stage 19, to Peio. The organizers chose to include no rest days. Torriani did not want to interfere with the World Cup being held in Mexico. When compared to the previous year's race, the race was 140 km (87 mi) shorter, contained two less rest days, and the same number of time trials. In addition, this race contained the same number of stages, but one less set of half stages.

l'Unita writer Gino Sala believed the route to be more challenging than the routes within the past few years. He criticized the route for the stage three team time trial for going over dangerous roads. Author Bill McGann believed Torriani designed the route to be relatively flat in order to increase the likelihood of Italian riders Giuseppe Saronni and Francesco Moser winning the race. Five-time champion Eddy Merckx believed the route to be "decapitated."

Stage characteristics and winners
Stage	Date	Course	Distance	Type	Winner
P	12 May	Palermo	1 km (1 mi)	Individual time trial	Urs Freuler (SUI)
1	12 May	Palermo to Sciacca	140 km (87 mi)	Stage with mountain(s)	Sergio Santimaria (ITA)
2	13 May	Sciacca to Catania	259 km (161 mi)	Plain stage	Jean-Paul van Poppel (NED)
3	14 May	Catania to Taormina	50 km (31 mi)	Team time trial	Del Tongo-Colnago
4	15 May	Villa San Giovanni to Nicotera	115 km (71 mi)	Stage with mountain(s)	Gianbattista Baronchelli (ITA)
5	16 May	Nicotera to Cosenza	194 km (121 mi)	Stage with mountain(s)	Greg LeMond (USA)
6	17 May	Cosenza to Potenza	251 km (156 mi)	Plain stage	Roberto Visentini (ITA)
7	18 May	Potenza to Baia Domizia	257 km (160 mi)	Stage with mountain(s)	Guido Bontempi (ITA)
8	19 May	Cellole to Avezzano	160 km (99 mi)	Stage with mountain(s)	Franco Chioccioli (ITA)
9	20 May	Avezzano to Rieti	172 km (107 mi)	Stage with mountain(s)	Acácio da Silva (POR)
10	21 May	Rieti to Pesaro	238 km (148 mi)	Stage with mountain(s)	Guido Bontempi (ITA)
11	22 May	Pesaro to Castiglione del Lago	207 km (129 mi)	Stage with mountain(s)	Guido Bontempi (ITA)
12	23 May	Sinalunga to Siena	46 km (29 mi)	Individual time trial	Lech Piasecki (POL)
13	24 May	Siena to Sarzana	175 km (109 mi)	Plain stage	Jean-Paul van Poppel (NED)
14	25 May	Savona to Sauze d'Oulx	236 km (147 mi)	Stage with mountain(s)	Martin Earley (IRL)
15	26 May	Sauze d'Oulx to Erba	260 km (162 mi)	Plain stage	Dag Erik Pedersen (NOR)
16	27 May	Erba to Foppolo	143 km (89 mi)	Stage with mountain(s)	Pedro Muñoz (ESP)
17	28 May	Foppolo to Piacenza	186 km (116 mi)	Plain stage	Guido Bontempi (ITA)
18	29 May	Piacenza to Cremona	36 km (22 mi)	Individual time trial	Francesco Moser (ITA)
19	30 May	Cremona to Peio	211 km (131 mi)	Stage with mountain(s)	Johan van der Velde (NED)
20	31 May	Peio to Bassano del Grappa	179 km (111 mi)	Plain stage	Guido Bontempi (ITA)
21	1 June	Bassano del Grappa to Bolzano	234 km (145 mi)	Stage with mountain(s)	Acácio da Silva (POR)
22	2 June	Merano to Merano	108.6 km (67 mi)	Plain stage	Eric Van Lancker (BEL)
	Total		3,858.6 km (2,398 mi)		

== Race overview ==
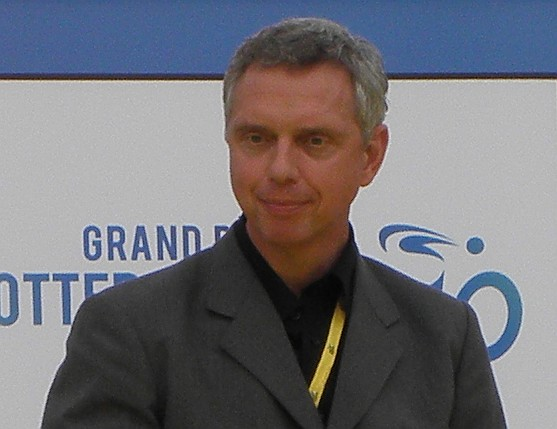
Dutch rider Jean-Paul van Poppel (pictured here at the 2010 Tour de France) won two stages at the 1986 Giro d'Italia.

The Giro began with a 1 km (0.6 mi) prologue that navigated through the streets of Palermo, which was won by Urs Freuler by one second over the second-placed finisher. Later that day, the first mass-start stage was raced. The leg was marred by a large crash about 10 km (6.2 mi) from the finish which saw Emilio Ravasio sustain heavy injuries and continue to race until the end of the leg. Shortly after the stage, he fell into a coma, only to die two weeks later. Sergio Santimaria won the stage through a field sprint, and, with the time bonus, he earned race leader's maglia rosa (English: pink jersey). Stage 2 also culminated with a bunch sprint where Skala-Skil's Jean-Paul van Poppel took the lead with 150 m (492.1 ft) left and held on to win, as well as take the overall lead. The third stage was a team time trial that traveled around Sicily. Del Tongo-Colnago won the time trial by nine seconds over Supermercati Brianzoli-Essebi, which put their rider Giuseppe Saronni into the pink jersey. Gianbattista Baronchelli rode away on a climb late into the fourth stage and rode by himself to victory, earning the race lead in the process. American Greg LeMond won the fifth stage after attacking a few kilometers from the finish. Saronni led the peloton across the finish line two seconds after LeMond crossed the finish line.

In the race's sixth stage, Roberto Visentini won the leg after attacking a few kilometers from the finish. Saronni regained the race lead after finishing second on the stage and earning a fifteen-second time bonus. The next two stages both resulted in a bunch sprint, with Guido Bontempi winning stage 7 and Franco Chioccioli, stage 8. The ninth stage contained the climbs of Monte Terminillo and La Forca and was considered one of the tougher stages in the race. Malvor-Bottecchia-Vaporella rider Acácio da Silva won the stage as the top of the general classification rankings remained unchanged from the previous days.

The twelfth stage of the race was a 46 km (28.6 mi) individual time trial that stretched from Sinalunga to Siena. Lech Piasecki of Del Tongo-Colnago won the stage and was one of five riders to complete the course in under an hour. Due to his strong time on the stage, Saronni increased his advantage over all of his rivals except for Visentini who finished quicker. The next day of racing saw several breakaway groups try to form, but all with no success as the main field finished the stage together with a field sprint that was won by van Poppel. The race's fourteenth stage saw the race head back into the mountains, with a summit finish to Sauze d'Oulx. As the peloton made its way up the final climb, Pedro Muñoz, Martin Earley, and Stefano Giuliani formed a breakaway group out in front. With about three kilometers left in the stage, Earley attacked and went on to win the stage after riding by himself for the remainder of the stage. Dag Erik Pedersen won the next stage through a bunch sprint.

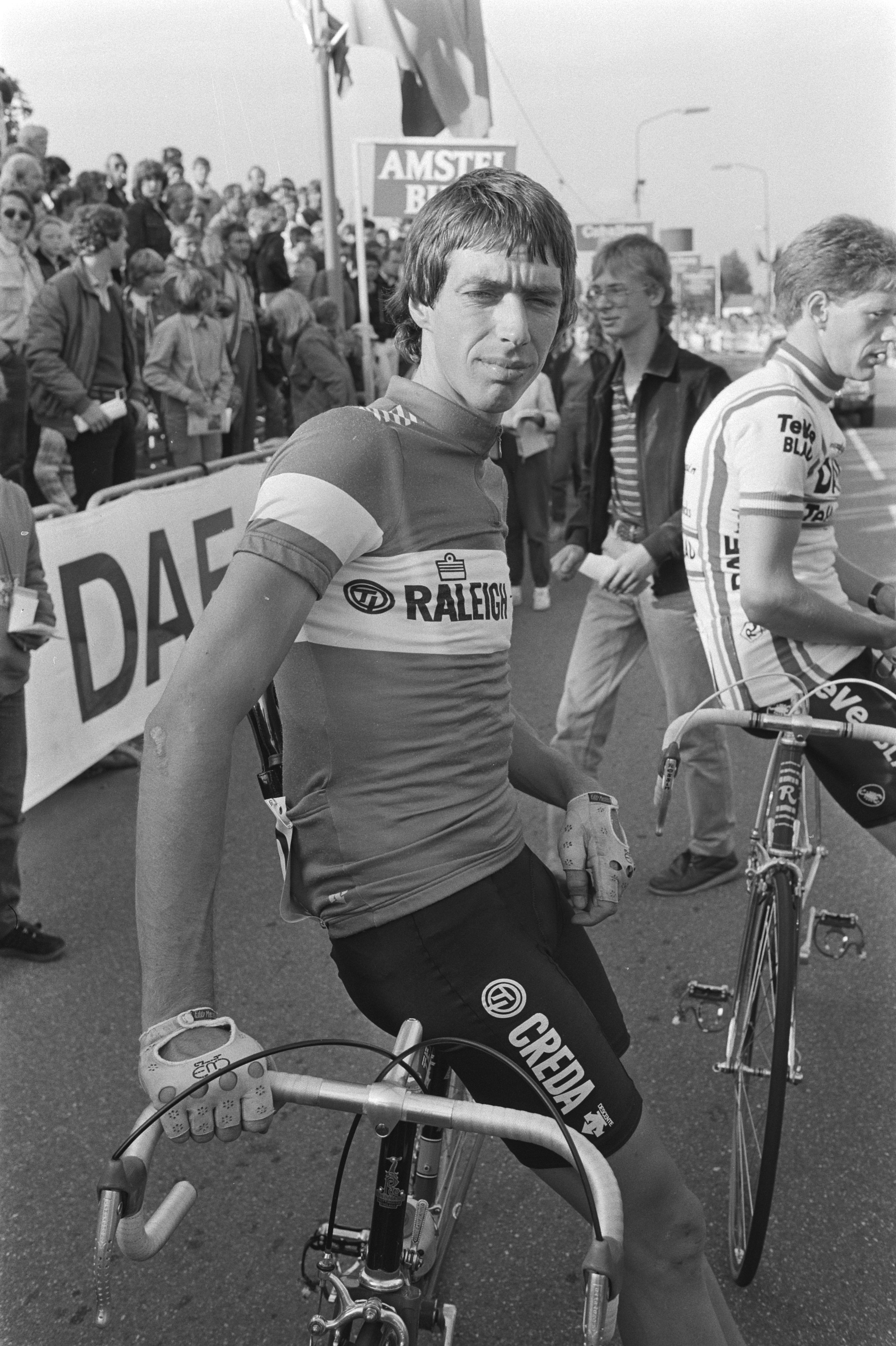
Johan van der Velde (pictured here in August 1982) won one stage at the 1986 Giro d'Italia and came in second in the points classification.

The sixteenth stage saw the race travel across several mountain passes in the Alps, with Muñoz winning the stage after attacking on the day's final climb of the day. Visentini, who finished third on the stage, gained enough time on Saronni to take the overall lead from him by over a minute. Bontempi won his fourth stage of the race after out-sprinting the rest of the peloton for the victory the day after. The next leg of the race was another individual time trial that was 36 km (22 mi) in length and very flat. Francesco Moser won the stage by forty-nine seconds over the second placed rider and his time, when coupled with the performance of the other riders, moved him into third overall. Panasonic–Merckx–Agu rider Johan van der Velde won the next leg of the race after attacking on a descent before the stage's final climb to Peio.

The twentieth stage of the race came down to a field sprint that was won by Bontempi. The penultimate stage of the race traversed several mountain passes in the Dolomites. Four riders escaped off the front of the peloton, meanwhile the general classification contenders remained together behind the leading group. As the leading group neared the finish, da Silva attacked and went on to win the stage by seven seconds. The general classification contenders finished together, despite attacks from LeMond. The race's final stage began and ended in Merano and 108.6 km (67.5 mi). Belgian Eric Van Lancker won the leg by means of a bunch sprint.

Three riders achieved multiple stage victories: Bontempi (stages 7, 10, 11, 17, and 20), da Silva (stages 9 and 21), and van Poppel (stages 2 and 13). Stage wins were achieved by eleven of the nineteen competing squads, eight of which won multiple stages. Carrera-Vagabond collected a total of six stage wins through two riders, Bontempi and Visentini (stage 6). Del Tongo-Colnago amassed a total of two stage victories through the team time trial and Piasecki (stage 12). Skala-Skil also collected two stage successes with van Poppel. Ariostea–Gres achieved the same feat with individual stage wins from Santimaria (stage 1) and Pedersen (stage 15). Fagor also secured two stage wins through Earley (stage 14) and Muñoz (stage 16). Supermercati Brianzoli-Essebi obtained two stage victories with Baronchelli (stage 4) and Moser (stage 18). Malvor-Bottecchia-Vaporella also collected two stage successes with da Silva. Panasonic-Merckx-Agu recorded two stage victories with van der Velde (stage 19) and Van Lancker (stage 22). Atala-Ofmega, La Vie Claire, and Ecoflam-Jollyscarpe-BFB Bruc. all won a single stage at the Giro, the first through Freuler (prologue), the second through LeMond (stage 5), and the third by Chioccioli (stage 8).

== Classification leadership ==
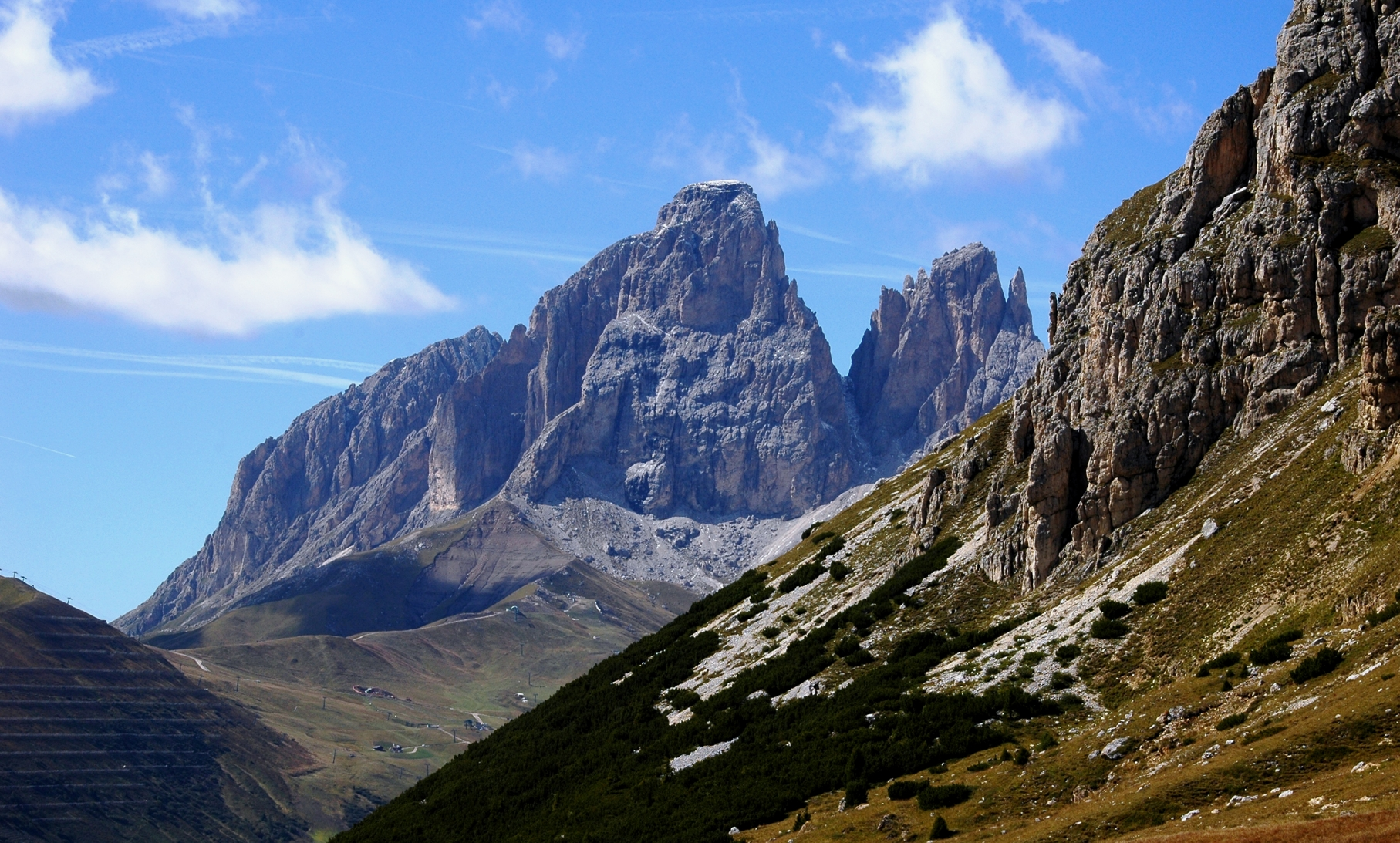
The Pordoi Pass was the Cima Coppi for the 1986 running of the Giro d'Italia.

Four different jerseys were worn during the 1986 Giro d'Italia. The leader of the general classification – calculated by adding the stage finish times of each rider, and allowing time bonuses for the first three finishers on mass-start stages – wore a pink jersey. This classification is the most important of the race, and its winner is considered as the winner of the Giro. Time bonuses of 20, 15, 10, and 5 seconds were awarded to each mass-start stage's first four finishers.

For the points classification, which awarded a purple (or cyclamen) jersey to its leader, cyclists were given points for finishing a stage in the top 15. No points were given at intermediate sprints.

The green jersey was awarded to the mountains classification leader. In this ranking, points were won by reaching the summit of a climb ahead of other cyclists. Each climb was ranked as either first, second or third category (first being the highest), with more points available for higher category climbs. The Cima Coppi, the race's highest point of elevation, awarded more points than the other first category climbs.The Cima Coppi for this Giro was the Passo Pordoi. The first rider to cross the Pordoi Pass was Spanish rider Pedro Muñoz.

The white jersey was worn by the leader of young rider classification, a ranking decided the same way as the general classification, but considering only neo-professional cyclists (in their first three years of professional racing).

Although no jersey was awarded, there was also one classification for the teams, in which the stage finish times of the best three cyclists per team were added; the leading team was the one with the lowest total time.

The rows in the following table correspond to the jerseys awarded after that stage was run.

Classification leadership by stage
Stage	Winner	General classification	Points classification	Mountains classification	Young rider classification	Team classification
P	Urs Freuler	Urs Freuler	not awarded	not awarded	not awarded	not awarded
1	Sergio Santimaria	Sergio Santimaria	Urs Freuler	Jesper Worre	Stefano Allocchio	Ariostea-Gres
2	Jean-Paul van Poppel	Jean-Paul van Poppel	Jean-Paul van Poppel	Jesper Worre	Jean-Paul van Poppel	Ariostea-Gres
3	Del Tongo-Colnago	Giuseppe Saronni	Jean-Paul van Poppel	Jesper Worre	Flavio Giupponi	Supermercati Brianzoli-Essebi
4	Gianbattista Baronchelli	Gianbattista Baronchelli	Johan van der Velde	Renato Piccolo	Flavio Giupponi	Supermercati Brianzoli-Essebi
5	Greg LeMond	Gianbattista Baronchelli	Johan van der Velde	Roberto Visentini	Flavio Giupponi	Supermercati Brianzoli-Essebi
6	Roberto Visentini	Giuseppe Saronni	Jean-Paul van Poppel	Roberto Visentini	Flavio Giupponi	Del Tongo-Colnago
7	Guido Bontempi	Giuseppe Saronni	Jean-Paul van Poppel	Roberto Visentini	Flavio Giupponi	Del Tongo-Colnago
8	Franco Chioccioli	Giuseppe Saronni	Stefano Colagè	Gianni Bugno	Flavio Giupponi	Del Tongo-Colnago
9	Acácio da Silva	Giuseppe Saronni	Stefano Colagè	Gianni Bugno	Flavio Giupponi	Del Tongo-Colnago
10	Guido Bontempi	Giuseppe Saronni	Stefano Colagè	Gianni Bugno	Flavio Giupponi	Del Tongo-Colnago
11	Guido Bontempi	Giuseppe Saronni	Guido Bontempi	Gianni Bugno	Flavio Giupponi	Del Tongo-Colnago
12	Lech Piasecki	Giuseppe Saronni	Guido Bontempi	Gianni Bugno	Flavio Giupponi	Del Tongo-Colnago
13	Jean-Paul van Poppel	Giuseppe Saronni	Guido Bontempi	Gianni Bugno	Flavio Giupponi	Del Tongo-Colnago
14	Martin Earley	Giuseppe Saronni	Guido Bontempi	Gianni Bugno	Flavio Giupponi	Supermercati Brianzoli-Essebi
15	Dag Erik Pedersen	Giuseppe Saronni	Guido Bontempi	Gianni Bugno	Flavio Giupponi	Supermercati Brianzoli-Essebi
16	Pedro Muñoz	Roberto Visentini	Guido Bontempi	Gianni Bugno	Marco Giovannetti	Supermercati Brianzoli-Essebi
17	Guido Bontempi	Roberto Visentini	Guido Bontempi	Gianni Bugno	Marco Giovannetti	Supermercati Brianzoli-Essebi
18	Francesco Moser	Roberto Visentini	Guido Bontempi	Gianni Bugno	Marco Giovannetti	Supermercati Brianzoli-Essebi
19	Johan van der Velde	Roberto Visentini	Guido Bontempi	Gianni Bugno	Marco Giovannetti	Supermercati Brianzoli-Essebi
20	Guido Bontempi	Roberto Visentini	Guido Bontempi	Gianni Bugno	Marco Giovannetti	Supermercati Brianzoli-Essebi
21	Acácio da Silva	Roberto Visentini	Guido Bontempi	Pedro Muñoz	Marco Giovannetti	Supermercati Brianzoli-Essebi
22	Eric Van Lancker	Roberto Visentini	Guido Bontempi	Pedro Muñoz	Marco Giovannetti	Supermercati Brianzoli-Essebi
Final		Roberto Visentini	Guido Bontempi	Pedro Muñoz	Marco Giovannetti	Supermercati Brianzoli-Essebi

== Final standings ==
Legend
Pink jersey	Denotes the winner of the General classification
Green jersey	Denotes the winner of the Mountains classification
Purple jersey	Denotes the winner of the Points classification
White jersey	Denotes the winner of the Young rider classification

=== General classification ===
Final general classification (1–10)
Rank	Name	Team	Time
1	Roberto Visentini (ITA)	Carrera Jeans–Vagabond	102h 33' 55"
2	Giuseppe Saronni (ITA)	Del Tongo-Colnago	+ 1' 02"
3	Francesco Moser (ITA)	Supermercati Brianzoli-Essebi	+ 2' 14"
4	Greg LeMond (USA)	La Vie Claire	+ 2' 26"
5	Claudio Corti (ITA)	Supermercati Brianzoli-Essebi	+ 4' 49"
6	Franco Chioccioli (ITA)	Ecoflam-Jollyscarpe-BFB Bruc.	+ 6' 58"
7	Acácio da Silva (POR)	Malvor-Bottecchia-Vaporella	+ 7' 12"
8	Marco Giovannetti (ITA)	Gis Gelati-Oece	+ 8' 03"
9	Niki Rüttimann (SUI)	La Vie Claire	+ 9' 15"
10	Pedro Muñoz (ESP)	Fagor	+ 11' 52"

=== Points classification ===
Final points classification (1–5)
	Rider	Team	Points
1	Guido Bontempi (ITA)	Carrera Jeans–Vagabond	167
2	Johan van der Velde (NED)	Panasonic–Merckx–Agu	148
3	Paolo Rosola (ITA)	Sammontana-Bianchi	115
4	Stefano Allocchio (ITA)	Malvor-Bottecchia-Vaporella	112
5	Stefano Colagè (ITA)	Dromedario-Laminox-Fibok	110

=== Mountains classification ===
Final mountains classification (1–5)
	Rider	Team	Points
1	Pedro Muñoz (ESP)	Fagor	54
2	Gianni Bugno (ITA)	Atala-Ofmega	35
3	Stefano Giuliani (ITA)	Supermercati Brianzoli-Essebi	32
4	Roberto Visentini (ITA)	Carrera Jeans–Vagabond	26
5	Renato Piccolo (ITA)	Malvor-Bottecchia-Vaporella	16
5	Martin Earley (IRL)	Fagor	16

=== Young rider classification ===
Final young riders classification (1–5)
	Rider	Team	Time
1	Marco Giovannetti (ITA)	Gis Gelati-Oece	102h 41' 58"
2	Stefano Colagè (ITA)	Dromedario-Laminox-Fibok	+ 7' 58"
3	Primož Čerin (YUG)	Malvor-Bottecchia-Vaporella	+ 18' 31"
4	Bruno Bulić (YUG)	Magniflex-Centroscarpa	+ 35' 32"
5	Maurizio Conti (ITA)	Santini-Cierre	+ 55' 16"

=== Team classification ===
Final team classification (1–3)
	Team	Time
1	Supermercati Brianzoli-Essebi	305h 33' 43"
2	Carrera Jeans–Vagabond	+ 22' 47"
3	La Vie Claire	+ 24' 06"

=== Combination classification ===
Final combination classification (1–5)
	Rider	Team	Points
1	Guido Bontempi (ITA)	Carrera Jeans–Vagabond	52
2	Pedro Muñoz (ESP)	Fagor	38
3	Eric Vanderaerden (BEL)	Panasonic–Merckx–Agu	30
4	Roberto Visentini (ITA)	Carrera Jeans–Vagabond	26
5	Acácio da Silva (POR)	Malvor-Bottecchia-Vaporella	25

=== Premio dell'Agonismo classification ===
Final premio dell'Agonismo classification (1–5)
	Rider	Team	Points
1	Dante Morandi (ITA)	Atala-Ofmega	12
2	Mario Noris (ITA)	Atala-Ofmega	11
3	Eric Vanderaerden (BEL)	Panasonic–Merckx–Agu	10
4	Ludo De Keulenaer (BEL)	Panasonic–Merckx–Agu	10
5	Mario Vitali (ITA)	Cilo-Aufina-Gemeaz Cusin	8

=== Traguardi fiat uno classification ===
Final traguardi fiat uno classification (1–5)
	Rider	Team	Points
1	Eric Van Lancker (BEL)	Panasonic–Merckx–Agu	20
2	Roberto Visentini (ITA)	Carrera Jeans–Vagabond	14
3	Greg LeMond (USA)	La Vie Claire	12
4	Acácio da Silva (POR)	Malvor-Bottecchia-Vaporella	10
5	Pedro Muñoz (ESP)	Fagor	6

=== Trofeo del 90 anni classification ===
Final traguardi trofeo del 90 anni classification (1–5)
	Rider	Team	Points
1	Teun van Vliet (NED)	Panasonic–Merckx–Agu	21
2	Eric Vanderaerden (BEL)	Panasonic–Merckx–Agu	12
3	Patrizio Gambirasio (ITA)	Santini-Cierre	11
4	Daniele Asti (ITA)	Magniflex-Centroscarpa	10
5	Jesper Worre (DEN)	Santini-Cierre	7
