= 1984 Giro del Trentino =

Race details
- Dates: 7–10 May 1984
- Stages: 3 + Prologue
- Distance: 627 km (389.6 mi)
- Winning time: 16h 26' 48"

Results
	Winner	Franco Chioccioli (ITA)
	Second	Emanuele Bombini (ITA)
	Third	Luciano Loro (ITA)

The 1984 Giro del Trentino was the eighth edition of the Tour of the Alps cycle race and was held on 7 May to 10 May 1984. The race started in Folgaria and finished in Trento. The race was won by Franco Chioccioli.

== General classification ==
Final general classification

Rank	Rider	Time
1	Franco Chioccioli (ITA)	16h 26' 48"
2	Emanuele Bombini (ITA)	+ 5"
3	Luciano Loro (ITA)	+ 17"
4	Mario Beccia (ITA)	+ 21"
5	Sven-Åke Nilsson (SWE)	+ 1' 23"
6	Acácio da Silva (POR)	+ 3' 18"
7	Dag Erik Pedersen (NOR)	+ 3' 30"
8	Gianbattista Baronchelli (ITA)	+ 3' 47"
9	Alessandro Paganessi (ITA)	+ 3' 53"
10	Alfredo Chinetti (ITA)	+ 4' 01"
