= 1983 Tirreno–Adriatico =

Race details
- Dates: 11–16 March 1983
- Stages: 5 + Prologue
- Distance: 856.8 km (532.4 mi)
- Winning time: 22h 50' 20"

Results
	Winner	Roberto Visentini (ITA)	(Inoxpran)
	Second	Gerrie Knetemann (NED)	(TI–Raleigh–Campagnolo)
	Third	Francesco Moser (ITA)	(Gis Gelati)

The 1983 Tirreno–Adriatico was the 18th edition of the Tirreno–Adriatico cycle race and was held from 11 March to 16 March 1983. The race started in Santa Severa and finished in San Benedetto del Tronto. The race was won by Roberto Visentini of the Inoxpran team.

== General classification ==
Final general classification

Rank	Rider	Team	Time
1	Roberto Visentini (ITA)	Inoxpran	22h 50' 20"
2	Gerrie Knetemann (NED)	TI–Raleigh–Campagnolo	+ 4"
3	Francesco Moser (ITA)	Gis Gelati	+ 59"
4	Czesław Lang (POL)	Gis Gelati	+ 59"
5	Alberto Fernández (ESP)	Zor–Gemeaz Cusin	+ 1' 03"
6	Giuseppe Petito (ITA)	Alfa Lum–Olmo	+ 1' 09"
7	Laurent Fignon (FRA)	Renault–Elf	+ 1' 09"
8	Serge Demierre (SUI)	Cilo–Aufina	+ 1' 17"
9	Giuseppe Saronni (ITA)	Del Tongo–Colnago	+ 1' 19"
10	Greg LeMond (USA)	Renault–Elf	+ 1' 19"
