= Mario Vitali =

Italian bobsledder (1914–1979)

Mario Vitali (8 February 1914 – 3 June 1979) was an Italian bobsledder who competed in the late 1940s. At the 1948 Winter Olympics in St. Moritz, he finished sixth in the two-man event.
