= Roberto Visentini =

Italian cyclist (born 1957)

Personal information
- Born: 2 June 1957 (age 69) Gardone Riviera, Italy

Cycling career
- Sport: Cycling
- Current team: Retired
- Discipline: Road
- Role: Rider
- Rider type: All Rounder

Professional teams
- 1978–1979: Vibor
- 1980–1982: Mobili San Giacomo–Benotto
- 1983–1988: Inoxpran
- 1989: Malvor–Sidi
- 1990: Jolly Componibili–Club 88

Major wins
- Grand Tours Giro d'Italia General classification (1986) Young rider classification (1978) 5 individual stages (1983, 1984, 1986, 1987) 1 TTT stage (1987) Vuelta a España 2 individual stages (1980) Stage races Tirreno–Adriatico (1983) Giro del Trentino (1981)

Roberto Visentini (born 2 June 1957) is an Italian former professional road racing cyclist who won the 1986 Giro d'Italia.

== Career ==
Visentini was born in Gardone Riviera, in the province of Brescia, and had a brilliant junior career. In 1975, he was both Junior Italian champion and World Champion. As an amateur he won the 1977 Italian time-trial Championship.

He debuted as professional in 1978. In 1980, he won two stages at the Vuelta a España and was ninth overall in the Giro d'Italia. In 1983 Visentini joined the Inoxpran team and was in contention for victory in the Giro with Giuseppe Saronni, but ended up on the podium 2nd place. Riding for the Carrera team in 1984, he won a stage in the 1984 Giro d'Italia and was in a podium position until very late in the race. This race became infamous because French rider Laurent Fignon accused officials of playing favourites by not treating all riders by the same set of rules. Visentini also felt this way making his feelings public.

During the 1984 season he also won a stage in Tirreno–Adriatico and the prologue of the Giro del Trentino. In the 1985 edition, he was in good position to win his first Giro being in the lead for 9 stages when he fell ill and was forced to retire, leaving the victory to Bernard Hinault.

He won the 1986 Giro by defeating racers such as Saronni and Francesco Moser by about 1:00 and 2:00 respectively, and also Greg LeMond who placed 4th. Visentini won stage 6 and took over the Pink Jersey on stage 16 which he would hold for the remainder of the race. In 1987 he played a part in one of the most controversial episodes of 1980s Italian cycle racing: Visentini, who was the racing for Carrera Jeans–Vagabond, took the pink jersey as the leader of the general classification from his teammate Stephen Roche after winning an individual time trial. Several days later in a mountain stage he was suddenly attacked by his teammate Roche, who had ignored the team's order not to attack. The Carrera team led the peloton in the chase after Roche until Visentini was left without any teammates. From there Visentini tried to chase him down on his own but finished several minutes behind the Irishman, who took back the pink jersey. Several days later Visentini had to retire from the race because of a broken wrist.

Roche left the Carrera team, which kept Visentini, but he was never again able to compete at this elite level. He concluded his career in 1990 with 18 victories, including the 1986 Giro d'Italia, the 1981 Giro del Trentino and the 1983 Tirreno–Adriatico.

== Major results ==
1975
1st Road race, UCI Junior Road World Championships
1st Gran Premio Palio del Recioto
1977
3rd Overall Trophée Peugeot de l'Avenir
1978
1st Young rider classification, Giro d'Italia
3rd Giro della Romagna
4th Overall Giro di Puglia
4th Tre Valli Varesine
4th Giro di Campania
5th Giro della Provincia di Reggio Calabria
8th Trofeo Pantalica
8th GP Industria & Artigianato di Larciano
10th Giro dell'Umbria
1979
3rd Overall Ruota d'Oro
3rd Giro della Romagna
4th Trofeo Pantalica
4th Giro della Provincia di Reggio Calabria
5th Overall Giro del Trentino
5th Overall Giro di Puglia
10th Overall Giro d'Italia
10th Giro dell'Umbria
1980
Vuelta a España

1st Prologue & Stage 16b (ITT)
Held after Prologue & Stages 1–4

3rd Overall Giro di Sardegna
5th Gran Premio Città di Camaiore
7th Trofeo Laigueglia
8th Gran Premio Industria e Commercio di Prato
9th Overall Giro d'Italia

Held after Stages 7–13

1981
1st Overall Giro del Trentino
4th Coppa Placci
6th Overall Giro d'Italia

Held after Stage 13

8th Giro di Toscana
9th GP Montelupo
10th Giro dell'Etna
1982
1st Trofeo Baracchi (with Daniel Gisiger)
5th Giro di Toscana
6th Overall Ruota d'Oro
7th Coppa Placci
8th Overall Tour de Suisse
9th Overall Giro del Trentino
10th GP Montelupo
1983
1st Overall Tirreno–Adriatico
1st Overall Ruota d'Oro

1st Prologue

2nd Overall Giro d'Italia

1st Stage 22 (ITT)

2nd Overall Tour of the Basque Country
7th Overall Tour de Romandie
7th Trofeo Laigueglia
1984
1st Stage 13 Giro d'Italia
1st Prologue Giro del Trentino
3rd Overall Tirreno–Adriatico

1st Stage 6 (ITT)

10th Trofeo Baracchi (with Czesław Lang)
1985
5th Tre Valli Varesine
Giro d'Italia

Held after Stages 4–11

1986
1st Overall Giro d'Italia

1st Stage 6
Held after Stages 5–7

1st Milano–Vignola
2nd Road race, National Road Championships
2nd Giro di Campania
6th Coppa Agostoni
7th Overall Tirreno–Adriatico
7th Trofeo Baracchi (with Stephen Roche)
8th Giro del Friuli
1987
Giro d'Italia

1st Prologue, Stages 3 (TTT) & 13 (ITT)
Held after Prologue & Stages 13–14

2nd Overall Giro di Puglia
1989
8th Overall Critérium International

=== Grand Tour general classification results timeline ===
Grand Tour	1978	1979	1980	1981	1982	1983	1984	1985	1986	1987	1988	1989	1990
Vuelta a España	—	—	15	—	—	—	—	—	—	—	—	—	DNF
Giro d'Italia	15	10	9	6	DNF	2	18	DNF	1	DNF	13	—	26
Tour de France	—	—	—	—	—	—	DNF	49	—	—	22	—	—

Legend
—	Did not compete
DNF	Did not finish
