= Sergio Santimaria =

Italian cyclist

Personal information
- Born: 26 April 1957 (age 69) Vigevano, Italy

Cycling career
- Sport: Cycling
- Current team: Retired
- Discipline: Road
- Role: Rider

Professional teams
- 1978–1980: Mecap–Hoonved
- 1981–1982: Selle San Marco
- 1983–1985: Del Tongo–Colnago
- 1986–1987: Ariostea–Gres

Sergio Santimaria (born 26 April 1957 in Vigevano) is an Italian former cyclist.

== Major results ==
1981
2nd Trofeo Matteotti
1982
2nd Gran Premio Città di Camaiore
1983
2nd GP Industria & Artigianato di Larciano
1984
1st Stage 14 Giro d'Italia
1986
1st Stage 1 Giro d'Italia
