= Fanini–Wührer =

Fanini–Maggi Mobili
Team information
- UCI code: FAN
- Registered: Italy
- Founded: 1984
- Disbanded: 1985
- Discipline: Road
- Status: Retired
- Bicycles: Fanini

Team name history
- 1984–1985 03/1985–04/1985 05/1985–07/1985 08/1985–12/1985: Fanini–Wührer; Linea MD Italia-Maggi Mobili; Fanini–Maggi Mobili; Lega FCI

Fanini–Wührer was an Italian professional cycling team that was active between 1984 and 1985. At the end of the 1985 season, the team merged with Murella–Rossin.

== History ==
The team's first manager was Piero Pieroni, who stayed for only one season. The team's most successful race was the Giro d'Italia, in which they participated in both seasons, and won a stage in 1985.

== Notable riders ==
- Stefano Tomasini Italy
- Franco Chioccioli Italy

== Major wins ==
=== Grand Tours ===
==== Giro d'Italia ====
- 1 stage (1 in 1985), Franco Chioccioli
