= 1985 Giro d'Italia =

Race details
- Dates: 16 May – 9 June 1985
- Stages: 22 + Prologue, including one split stage
- Distance: 3,998.6 km (2,484.6 mi)
- Winning time: 105h 46' 51"

Results
Jersey awarded to the overall winner	Winner	Bernard Hinault (FRA)	(La Vie Claire)
	Second	Francesco Moser (ITA)	(Gis Gelati-Trentino Vacanze)
	Third	Greg LeMond (USA)	(La Vie Claire)
Jersey awarded to the points classification winner	Points	Johan van der Velde (NED)	(Vini Ricordi-Pinarello)
Jersey awarded to the mountains classification winner	Mountains	José Luis Navarro (ESP)	(Gemeaz Cusin-Zor)
Jersey awarded to the young rider classification winner	Young rider	Alberto Volpi (ITA)	(Sammontana-Bianchi)
	Combination	Urs Freuler (SUI)	(Atala-Ofmega-Campagnolo)
	Team	Alpilatte-Olmo-Cierre	

The 1985 Giro d'Italia was the 68th running of the Giro. It started in Palermo, on 16 May, with a 6.6 km (4.1 mi) prologue and concluded in Lucca, on 9 June, with a 48 km (29.8 mi) individual time trial. A total of 180 riders from twenty teams entered the 22-stage race, that was won by Frenchman Bernard Hinault of the La Vie Claire team. The second and third places were taken by Italian Francesco Moser and American Greg LeMond, respectively.

Moser led the race for the first two days after winning the opening prologue. He lost the lead to Giuseppe Saronni after his team won the stage three team time trial. Upon conclusion of the event's fourth stage, Roberto Visentini won sufficient time to take the race leader's maglia rosa (English: pink jersey) from Saronni. Visentini held the jersey for a total of eight days of racing, during which the race traversed the Dolomites, before losing it to Hinault after the stage 12 time trial. Hinault then successfully defended his lead through the Alps, all the way to the race's finish.

Amongst the other classifications that the race awarded, Johan van der Velde of Vini Ricordi-Pinarello won the points classification, José Luis Navarro of Gemeaz Cusin-Zor won the mountains classification, and Sammontana-Bianchi's Alberto Volpi completed the Giro as the best neo-professional in the general classification, finishing tenth overall. Alpilatte-Olmo-Cierre finishing as the winners of the team classification, ranking each of the twenty teams contesting the race by lowest cumulative time.

== Teams ==
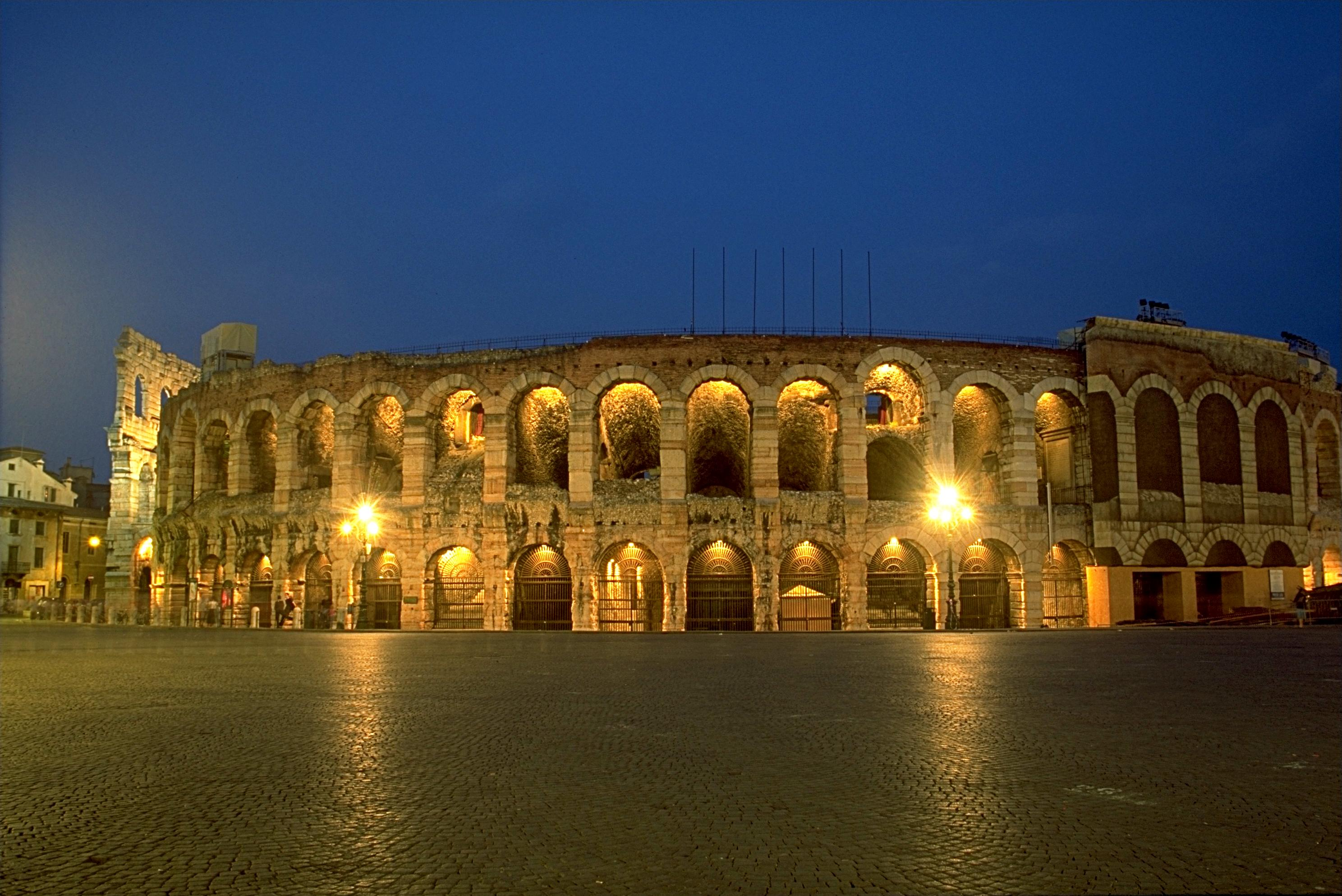
The team presentation ceremony took place on 15 May at the Verona Arena in Verona.

A total of twenty teams were invited to participate in the 1985 Giro d'Italia, six of which were based outside of Italy. The presentation of the teams – where each team's roster and manager are introduced in front the media and local dignitaries – took place at the Verona Arena on 15 May. The starting riders came from a total of 18 different countries; Italy (94), Switzerland (21), and the United States all had 10 or more riders. Each team sent a squad of nine riders, which meant that the race started with a peloton of 180 cyclists.

Of those starting, 78 were riding the Giro d'Italia for the first time. The average age of riders was 26.61 years, ranging from 20–year–old Juan Carlos Castillo (Varta-Café de Colombia) to 39–year–old Wladimiro Panizza (Ariostea). The team with the youngest average rider age was Gemeaz Cusin-Zor (23), while the oldest was Supermercati Brianzoli (29). From the riders that began this edition, 135 made it to the finish in Lucca.

The teams entering the race were:

- Ariostea
- Alpilatte-Olmo-Cierre
- Atala-Ofmega-Campagnolo
- Carrera–Inoxpran
- Cilo-Aufina
- Del Tongo-Colnago
- Dromedario-Laminox
- Gemeaz Cusin-Zor
- Gis Gelati-Trentino Vacanze
- La Vie Claire
- Maggi Mobili-Fanini
- Malvor-Bottecchia
- Murella-Rossin
- Varta-Café de Colombia
- Sammontana-Bianchi
- Santini-Conti-Galli
- 7-Eleven
- Skil-Sem
- Supermercati Brianzoli
- Vini Ricordi-Pinarello

== Pre-race favorites ==
The starting peloton did include the 1984 winner, Francesco Moser. Two–time champion Bernard Hinault entered the race with a strong supporting La Vie Claire team as he sought a third overall victory. Author Bill McGann believed that going into the race Hinault was "the world's most potent racing machine" and that Moser would have to ride very well in order to repeat as champion. Mario Fossati of La Repubblica named Moser, Saronni, Hinault, and Greg LeMond as contenders for the overall crown. LeMond rode the Giro d'Italia for the first time this edition. Spanish rider Marino Lejarreta decided not to race the Vuelta a España in favor of racing the Giro. Luis Gómez, of El Pais, believed Lejarreta to be in top form going into the race and that he could challenge for the overall victory. Javier Dalmases, an El Mundo sportswriter, believed that there was no clear favorite for the race. Prominent French rider Laurent Fignon did not participate in the race due to an inflamed Achilles tendon.

== Route and stages ==
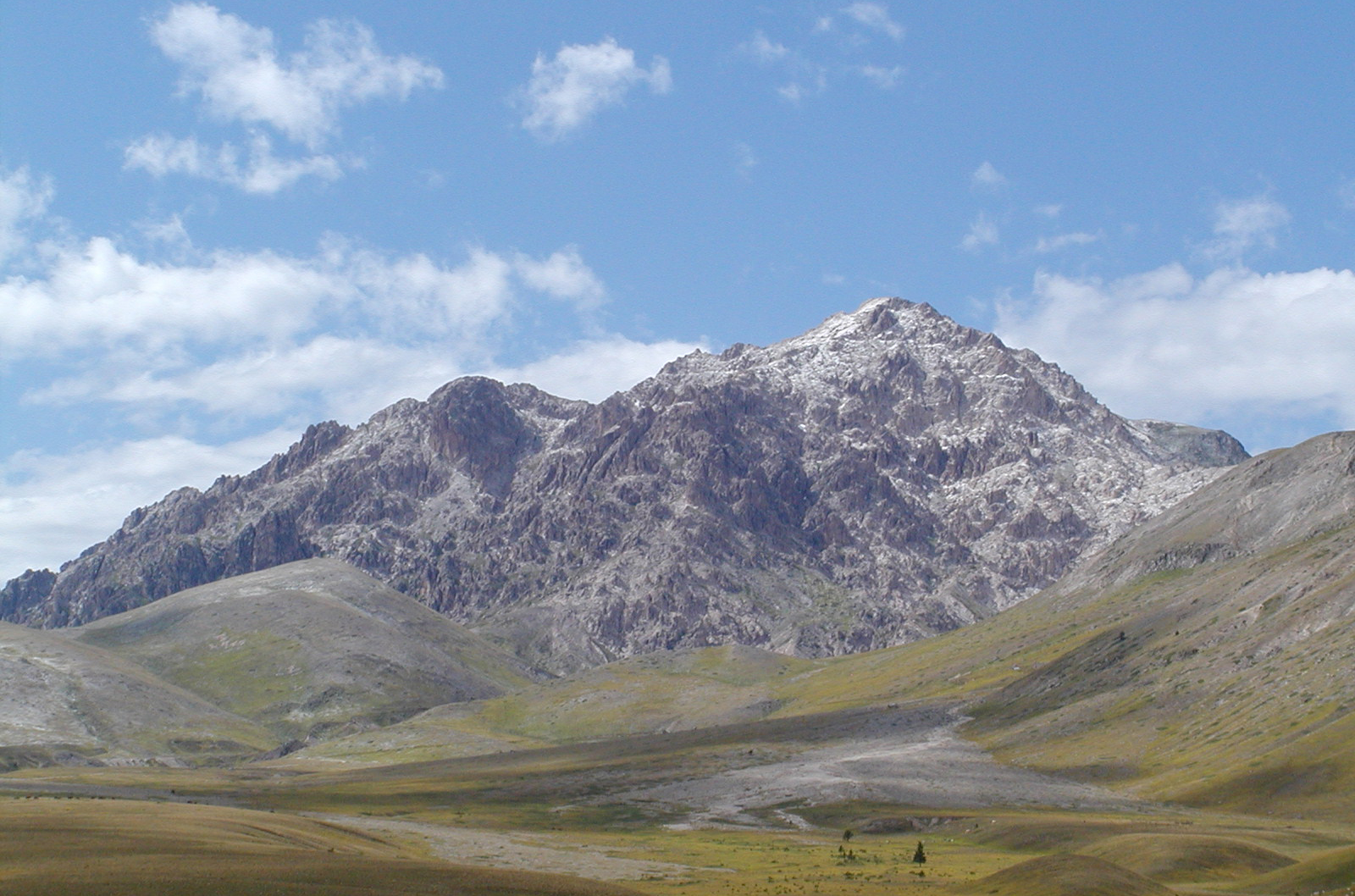
The Gran Sasso d'Italia hosted the end of the 195 km (121 mi) fourteenth stage.

The route for the 1985 edition of the Giro d'Italia was revealed to the public by head organizer Vincenzo Torriani on 16 February 1985. Covering a total of 3,998.6 km (2,484.6 mi), it included four time trials (three individual and one for teams), and eleven stages with categorized climbs that awarded mountains classification points. Three of these eleven stages had summit finishes: stage 4, to Selva di Val Gardena; stage 14, to Gran Sasso d'Italia; and stage 20, to Valnontey di Cogne. The organizers chose to include two rest days. When compared to the previous year's race, the race was 190.6 km (118 mi) longer and contained the same number of time trials and rest days. In addition, this race contained the same number of stages, but one more set of half stages.

Luis Gómez, an El Pais writer, believed that the route was designed to benefit the Italian participants, with there being three individual time trials, the team time trial being flat, and most stages being primarily flat. El Mundo writer Javier Dalmases believed that the route was purposefully less mountainous so that an Italian would win the race, citing that this route favored the likes of Giuseppe Saronni or Moreno Argentin. La Stampa's Gian Paolo Ormezzano thought overall easiness of the course — the few mountains and summit finishes — added some mystery as to who could win.

Stage characteristics and winners
Stage	Date	Course	Distance	Type	Winner
P	16 May	Verona	6.6 km (4 mi)	Individual time trial	Francesco Moser (ITA)
1	17 May	Verona to Busto Arsizio	218 km (135 mi)	Plain stage	Urs Freuler (SUI)
2	18 May	Busto Arsizio to Milan	38 km (24 mi)	Team time trial	Del Tongo-Colnago
3	19 May	Milan to Pinzolo	190 km (118 mi)	Stage with mountain(s)	Giuseppe Saronni (ITA)
4	20 May	Pinzolo to Selva di Val Gardena	237 km (147 mi)	Stage with mountain(s)	Hubert Seiz (SUI)
5	21 May	Selva di Val Gardena to Vittorio Veneto	225 km (140 mi)	Stage with mountain(s)	Emanuele Bombini (ITA) (Note: Roberto Pagnin was the original winner of stage 5 but was later relegated to second place.)
6	22 May	Vittorio Veneto to Cervia	237 km (147 mi)	Plain stage	Frank Hoste (BEL)
7	23 May	Cervia to Jesi	185 km (115 mi)	Stage with mountain(s)	Orlando Maini (ITA)
	24 May	Rest day			
8a	25 May	Foggia to Foggia	45 km (28 mi)	Plain stage	Stefano Allocchio (ITA) (Note: Stage 8A used the "Giri-sprint" format, which was used 5 times in the 1980s. This stage was held on a circuit of 5 km, which the riders rode 9 times. The first time that the riders crossed the finish, the first three riders received a small time bonus (3, 2 and 1 seconds), while the ninth time the time bonus was 10, 7, 5 and 3 seconds, and there was a special prize for the rider who received the most time bonus. In stage 8A, this special prize was won by Anderson.)
8b	25 May	Foggia to Matera	167 km (104 mi)	Plain stage	Acácio da Silva (POR)
9	26 May	Matera to Crotone	237 km (147 mi)	Plain stage	Paolo Rosola (ITA)
10	27 May	Crotone to Paola	203 km (126 mi)	Stage with mountain(s)	Acácio da Silva (POR)
11	28 May	Paola to Salerno	240 km (149 mi)	Stage with mountain(s)	Stefano Allocchio (ITA)
12	29 May	Capua to Maddaloni	38 km (24 mi)	Individual time trial	Bernard Hinault (FRA)
13	30 May	Maddaloni to Frosinone	154 km (96 mi)	Plain stage	Urs Freuler (SUI)
14	31 May	Frosinone to Gran Sasso d'Italia	195 km (121 mi)	Stage with mountain(s)	Franco Chioccioli (ITA)
15	1 June	L'Aquila to Perugia	208 km (129 mi)	Stage with mountain(s)	Ron Kiefel (USA)
16	2 June	Perugia to Cecina	217 km (135 mi)	Plain stage	Giuseppe Saronni (ITA)
17	3 June	Cecina to Modena	248 km (154 mi)	Stage with mountain(s)	Daniel Gisiger (SUI)
	4 June	Rest day			
18	5 June	Monza to Domodossola	128 km (80 mi)	Plain stage	Paolo Rosola (ITA)
19	6 June	Domodossola to Saint-Vincent	247 km (153 mi)	Stage with mountain(s)	Francesco Moser (ITA)
20	7 June	Saint-Vincent to Valnontey di Cogne	58 km (36 mi)	Stage with mountain(s)	Andrew Hampsten (USA)
21	8 June	Saint-Vincent to Genoa	229 km (142 mi)	Plain stage	Urs Freuler (SUI)
22	9 June	Lido di Camaiore to Lucca	48 km (30 mi)	Individual time trial	Francesco Moser (ITA)
	Total		3,998.6 km (2,485 mi)		

== Race overview ==
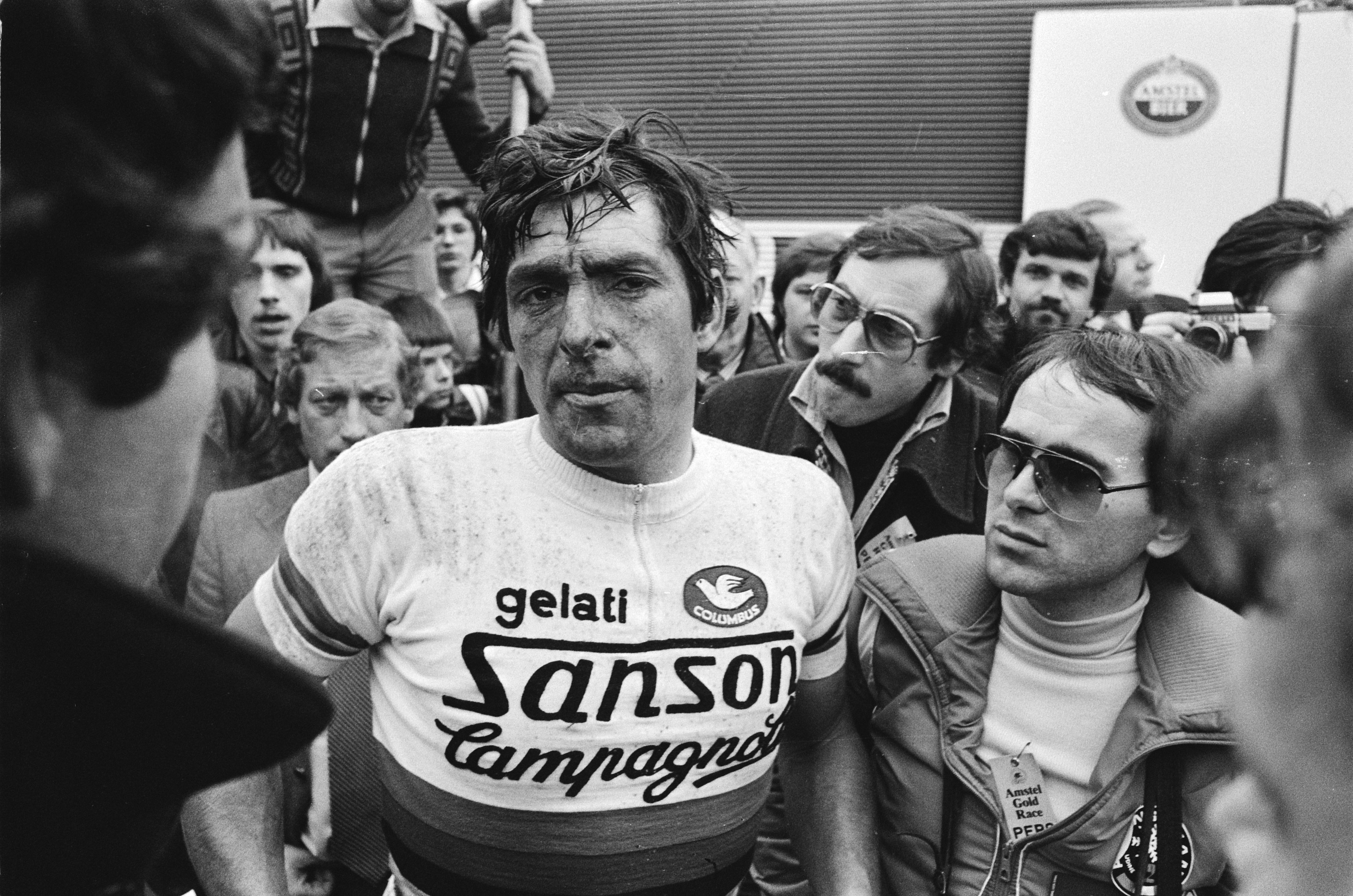
Francesco Moser (pictured here at the Amstel Gold Race in 1978) came into the Giro as a favorite to repeat as champion. He finished in second place overall and won three stages.

The event began with a 6.6 km (4.1 mi) prologue around the city of Verona. The brief time trial leg was won by Francesco Moser, who finished seven seconds faster than the second placed rider. The following day was the first mass-start stage of the race, which culminated in a bunch sprint that was won by Atala-Ofmega-Campagnolo's Urs Freuler. The second stage was a team time trial that stretched 38 km (23.6 mi). Del Tongo-Colnago won the leg and their rider, Giuseppe Saronni, earned enough of an advantage to take race lead and don the race leader's maglia rosa (English: pink jersey). The third stage saw Saronni expand upon his lead by winning the leg after out-sprinting the rest of the leading group. The fourth stage took the race into the Dolomites, as well as featuring a summit finish on Selva di Val Gardena. Spanish rider Marino Lejarreta attacked with around 15 km (9.3 mi) to go and only Roberto Visentini, Bernard Hinault, Hubert Saiz, and Gianbattista Baronchelli were able to mark his move. The group of five stayed together to the finish as Saiz took the stage victory by edging out Hinault. Visentini took the race lead after Saronni finished over four minutes behind, while another Italian favorite Francesco Moser finished two minutes behind.

The route went through more mountains in the fifth stage. With large amounts of rain, the peloton made a truce and the stage saw few attacks. A three-man breakaway formed with around twelve kilometers to go. The riders stayed together and all sprinted for the stage win, which was originally won by Roberto Pagnin; however, due to his non-linear sprint line that interfered with the two other riders, he was relegated to second place and the original second-place finisher, Emanuele Bombini, was promoted and declared winner. The next day of racing ended with a bunch sprint won by Frank Hoste, but a crash with two kilometers to go from the finish saw general classification contenders Visentini and Saronni, as well as others, lose twenty seconds. The seventh stage saw a six-man breakaway survive and finish ahead of the peloton by almost two minutes as Orlando Maini won the day.

The first part of the eighth stage was only 45 km, and the riders rode 50.1 km/h on average, setting a new record for a non-time trial stage in the Giro, which was only broken in 2020.

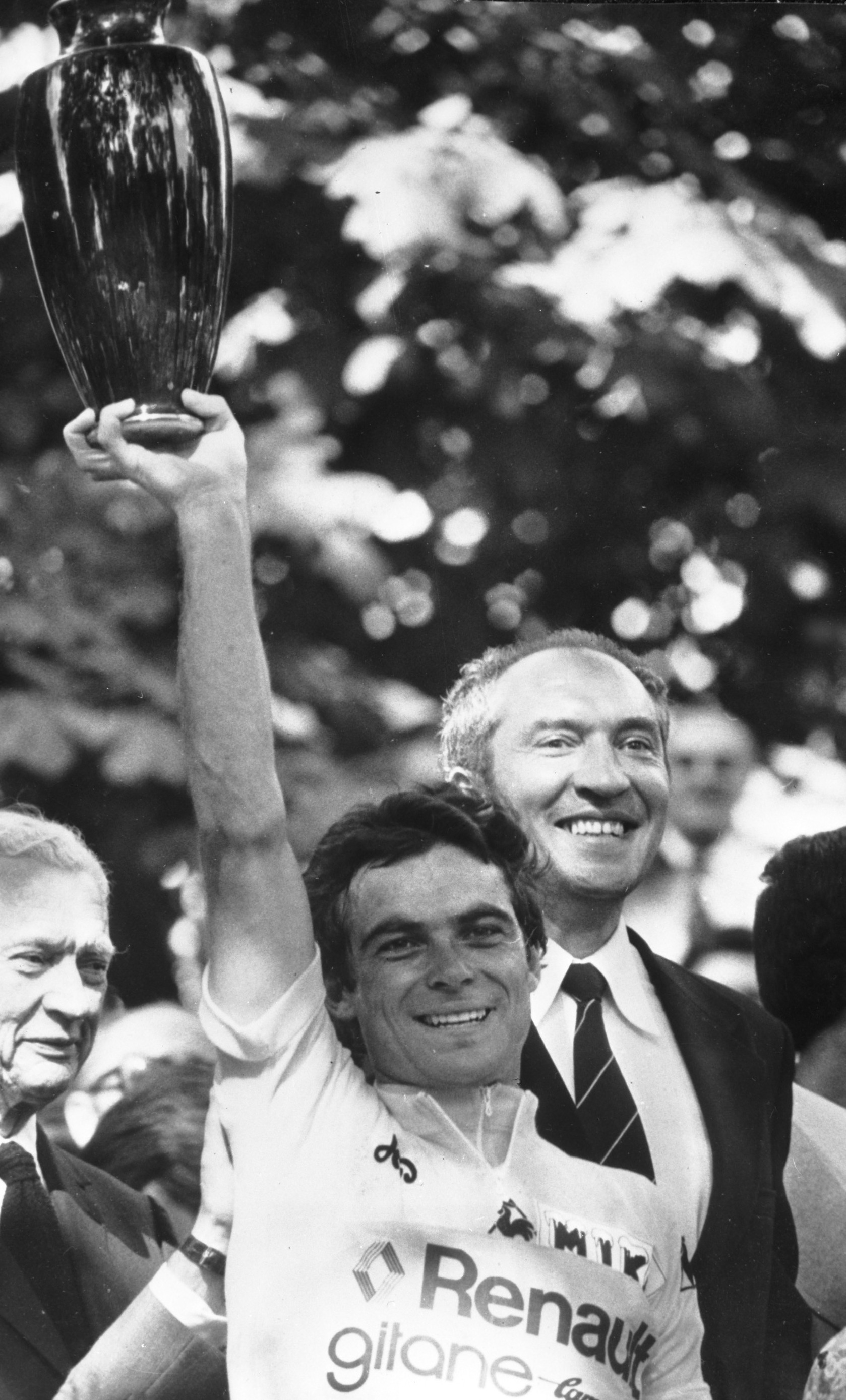
Bernard Hinault (pictured here at the 1978 Tour de France) won a single stage, in addition to the general classification.

The twelfth stage of the race was 38 km (23.6 mi) individual time trial. Hinault won the stage by fifty-three seconds over Moser. Hinault's time gains were enough to give him the race lead by a minute and fourteen seconds. The thirteenth stage saw Freuler win his second stage of the race by virtue of a sprint finish. Italian Franco Chioccioli won the mountainous fourteenth leg of the event after attacking on the descent of the third climb of the day. The following day of racing began with a twenty-man breakaway forming off the front of the peloton; however, all but one rider was caught with ten kilometers remaining. With under five kilometers left, another four-man attack group formed, of which 7-Eleven's Ron Kiefel survived. Kiefel caught the lone remaining rider in front and went on to win the stage as the peloton crossed the line three seconds behind. This was the first stage victory by an American in the history of the Giro d'Italia. The sixteenth stage saw the day of racing end with a field sprint which was won by Saronni.

Race leader Hinault and his team, La Vie Claire, allowed a breakaway to get almost a twenty-minute advantage over the peloton during the race's seventeenth stage, before other general classification contenders' teams stepped in to help with the chase. The attack group reached the finish line around ten minutes faster than the peloton. Swiss rider Daniel Gisiger won the stage ahead of Giovanni Mantovani. Paolo Rosola won his second stage of the event as the eighteenth stage resulted in a bunch sprint. The following day's race route was altered the night before by Torriani, which removed six kilometers off the climb of Great St Bernard Pass, while it still contained the full climb of the Cima Coppi, the Simplon Pass. The stage saw a large group of fifty-three riders cross the finish line together, with Moser at the head, taking his second stage victory of the event. Former race leader Visentini, after losing a significant amount of time during the stage 16 individual time trial, abandoned the race during the nineteenth stage.

Stage 20 was a brief 58 km (36 mi) that featured a seventeen kilometer ascent to finish the leg. La Vie Claire drove a hard pace throughout the stage and fractured the peloton in the process. American Andrew Hampsten attacked with around nineteen kilometers to go and won the stage by a minute over the second-place finisher. The penultimate stage of the race was culminated with a field sprint, which was won by Freuler. The final stage of the race was a 48 km (30 mi) individual time trial that stretched from Lido di Camaiore to Lucca. Moser was able to win the stage by seven seconds on race leader Hinault, which was not enough to overcome Hinault and take first. This meant Hinault won his third Giro d'Italia.

Six riders achieved multiple stage victories: Freuler (stages 1, 13, and 21), Moser (prologue and stages 19 and 22), da Silva (stages 8b and 10), Allocchio (stages 8a and 11), Saronni (stages 3 and 16), and Rosola (stages 9 and 18). Stage wins were achieved by nine of the twenty competing squads, six of which won multiple stages. Del Tongo-Colnago collected a total of five wins through the team time trial, Saronni, Bombini (stage 5), and Hoste (stage 6). Atala-Ofmega-Campagnolo amassed a total of four stage wins through Freuler and Gisiger (stage 17). Malvor-Bottecchia also secured four stage wins through da Silva and Allocchio. Sammontana-Bianchi obtained two stage victories with Rosola. Gis Gelati-Trentino Vacanze collected two stage successes with Moser. 7-Eleven recorded two stage wins with Kiefel (stage 15) and Hampsten (stage 20). Cilo-Aufina, Alpilatte-Olmo-Cierre, and La Vie Claire all won a single stage at the Giro, the first through Seiz (stage 4), the second through Maini (stage 7), and the third by Hinault (stage 12), and the fourth with Chioccioli (stage 14).

== Classification leadership ==
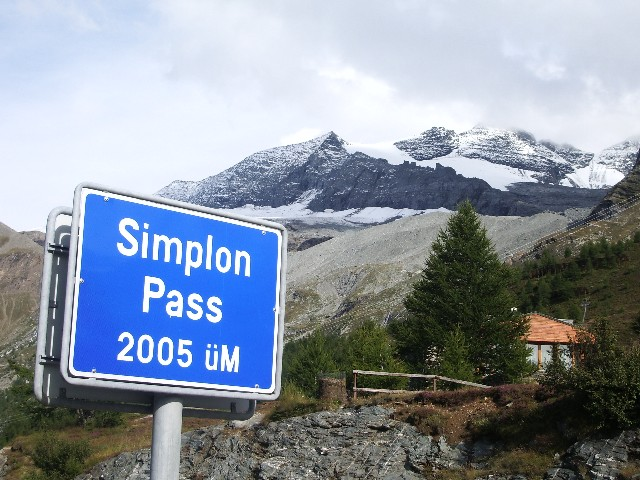
The Simplon Pass was the Cima Coppi for the 1985 running of the Giro d'Italia.

Four different jerseys were worn during the 1985 Giro d'Italia. The leader of the general classification – calculated by adding the stage finish times of each rider, and allowing time bonuses for the first four finishers on mass-start stages – wore a pink jersey. This classification is the most important of the race, and its winner is considered as the winner of the Giro. Time bonuses of 20, 15, 10, and 5 seconds were awarded to each mass-start stage's first four finishers.

For the points classification, which awarded a purple (or cyclamen) jersey to its leader, cyclists were given points for finishing a stage in the top 15. No points were given at intermediate sprints.

The green jersey was awarded to the mountains classification leader. In this ranking, points were won by reaching the summit of a climb ahead of other cyclists. Each climb was ranked as either first, second or third category, with more points available for higher category climbs. The Cima Coppi, the race's highest point of elevation, awarded more points than the other first category climbs. The Cima Coppi for this Giro was the Simplon Pass. The first rider to cross the Simplon Pass was Colombian rider Reynel Montoya.

The white jersey was worn by the leader of young rider classification, a ranking decided the same way as the general classification, but considering only neo-professional cyclists (in their first three years of professional racing).

Although no jersey was awarded, there was also one classification for the teams, in which the stage finish times of the best three cyclists per team were added; the leading team was the one with the lowest total time.

The rows in the following table correspond to the jerseys awarded after that stage was run.

Classification leadership by stage
Stage	Winner	General classification	Points classification	Mountains classification	Young rider classification	Team classification
P	Francesco Moser	Francesco Moser	not awarded	not awarded	not awarded	not awarded
1	Urs Freuler	Francesco Moser	Urs Freuler	not awarded	Roberto Calovi	Gis Gelati-Trentino Vacanze
2	Del Tongo-Colnago	Giuseppe Saronni	Urs Freuler	not awarded	Roberto Calovi	Del Tongo-Colnago
3	Giuseppe Saronni	Giuseppe Saronni	Giuseppe Saronni	Acácio da Silva	Alberto Volpi	Del Tongo-Colnago
4	Hubert Seiz	Roberto Visentini	Johan van der Velde	Acácio da Silva	Alberto Volpi	Carrera–Inoxpran
5	Emanuele Bombini	Roberto Visentini	Johan van der Velde	Acácio da Silva	Alberto Volpi	Carrera–Inoxpran
6	Frank Hoste	Roberto Visentini	Urs Freuler	Acácio da Silva	Alberto Volpi	Carrera–Inoxpran
7	Orlando Maini	Roberto Visentini	Johan van der Velde	Acácio da Silva	Alberto Volpi	Carrera–Inoxpran
8a	Stefano Allocchio	Roberto Visentini	Johan van der Velde	Acácio da Silva	Alberto Volpi	Carrera–Inoxpran
8b	Acácio da Silva	Roberto Visentini	Johan van der Velde	Acácio da Silva	Alberto Volpi	Carrera–Inoxpran
9	Paolo Rosola	Roberto Visentini	Johan van der Velde	Acácio da Silva	Alberto Volpi	Carrera–Inoxpran
10	Acácio da Silva	Roberto Visentini	Johan van der Velde	Acácio da Silva	Alberto Volpi	Alpilatte-Olmo-Cierre
11	Stefano Allocchio	Roberto Visentini	Johan van der Velde	Acácio da Silva	Alberto Volpi	Alpilatte-Olmo-Cierre
12	Bernard Hinault	Bernard Hinault	Johan van der Velde & Urs Freuler	Acácio da Silva	Alberto Volpi	Alpilatte-Olmo-Cierre
13	Urs Freuler	Bernard Hinault	Urs Freuler	Acácio da Silva	Alberto Volpi	Alpilatte-Olmo-Cierre
14	Franco Chioccioli	Bernard Hinault	Johan van der Velde	Acácio da Silva	Alberto Volpi	Alpilatte-Olmo-Cierre
15	Ron Kiefel	Bernard Hinault	Johan van der Velde	Acácio da Silva	Alberto Volpi	Alpilatte-Olmo-Cierre
16	Giuseppe Saronni	Bernard Hinault	Johan van der Velde	Acácio da Silva	Alberto Volpi	Alpilatte-Olmo-Cierre
17	Daniel Gisiger	Bernard Hinault	Johan van der Velde	José Luis Navarro	Alberto Volpi	Del Tongo-Colnago
18	Paolo Rosola	Bernard Hinault	Johan van der Velde	José Luis Navarro	Alberto Volpi	Del Tongo-Colnago
19	Francesco Moser	Bernard Hinault	Johan van der Velde	José Luis Navarro	Alberto Volpi	Del Tongo-Colnago
20	Andrew Hampsten	Bernard Hinault	Johan van der Velde	José Luis Navarro	Alberto Volpi	Alpilatte-Olmo-Cierre
21	Urs Freuler	Bernard Hinault	Johan van der Velde	José Luis Navarro	Alberto Volpi	Alpilatte-Olmo-Cierre
22	Francesco Moser	Bernard Hinault	Johan van der Velde	José Luis Navarro	Alberto Volpi	Alpilatte-Olmo-Cierre
Final		Bernard Hinault	Johan van der Velde	José Luis Navarro	Alberto Volpi	Alpilatte-Olmo-Cierre

== Final standings ==
Legend
Pink jersey	Denotes the winner of the General classification
Green jersey	Denotes the winner of the Mountains classification
Purple jersey	Denotes the winner of the Points classification
White jersey	Denotes the winner of the Young rider classification

=== General classification ===
Final general classification (1–10)
Rank	Name	Team	Time
1	Bernard Hinault (FRA)	La Vie Claire	105h 46' 51"
2	Francesco Moser (ITA)	Gis Gelati-Trentino Vacanze	+ 1' 08"
3	Greg LeMond (USA)	La Vie Claire	+ 2' 55"
4	Tommy Prim (SWE)	Sammontana-Bianchi	+ 4' 53"
5	Marino Lejarreta (ESP)	Alpilatte-Olmo-Cierre	+ 6' 30"
6	Gianbattista Baronchelli (ITA)	Supermercati Brianzoli	+ 6' 32"
7	Silvano Contini (ITA)	Ariostea	+ 7' 22"
8	Michael Wilson (AUS)	Alpilatte-Olmo-Cierre	+ 7' 38"
9	Franco Chioccioli (ITA)	Maggi Mobili-Fanini	+ 8' 33"
10	Alberto Volpi (ITA)	Sammontana-Bianchi	+ 10' 31"

=== Points classification ===
Final points classification (1–5)
	Rider	Team	Points
1	Johan van der Velde (NED)	Carrera–Inoxpran	195
2	Urs Freuler (SUI)	Atala	172
3	Francesco Moser (ITA)	Gis Gelati-Trentino Vacanze	140
4	Frank Hoste (BEL)	Del Tongo	126
5	Franco Chioccioli (ITA)	Maggi Mobili-Fanini	122

=== Mountains classification ===
Final mountains classification (1–5)
	Rider	Team	Points
1	José Luis Navarro (ESP)	Gemeaz Cusin-Zor	54
2	Reynel Montoya (COL)	Varta-Café de Colombia	47
3	Rafael Acevedo (COL)	Varta-Café de Colombia	38
4	Acácio da Silva (POR)	Malvor-Bottecchia	32
5	Andrew Hampsten (USA)	7-Eleven	30

=== Young rider classification ===
Final young rider's classification (1–5)
	Rider	Team	Time
1	Alberto Volpi (ITA)	Sammontana-Bianchi	105h 57' 22"
2	Marco Giovannetti (ITA)	Ariostea	+ 3' 59"
3	José Luis Navarro (ESP)	Gemeaz Cusin-Zor	+ 10' 19"
4	Andrew Hampsten (USA)	7-Eleven	+ 10' 52"
5	Luca Rota (ITA)	Murella-Rossin	+ 15' 47"

=== Team classification ===
Final team classification (1–3)
	Team	Time
1	Alpilatte-Olmo-Cierre	315h 47' 32"
2	Del Tongo-Colnago	+ 4' 44"
3	La Vie Claire	+ 5' 29"

=== Minor classifications ===
There were a few minor classifications:

- The Premio dell'Agonismo, an intermediate sprints classification, won by Eric Heiden.
- The Classifica del passista, a secondary intermediate sprints classification, won by Paolo Rosola.
- The FIAT Uno classification, where rider scored points by reaching the flag of the last kilometer first, won by Marino Lejarreta.
- A combination classification, won by Urs Freuler.
- A time trial classification, calculated by summing the individual times in all time trials, won by Bernard Hinault.
