= Franco Chioccioli =

Italian cyclist

Personal information
- Full name: Franco Chioccioli
- Born: 25 August 1959 (age 67) Castelfranco di Sopra, Italy

Cycling career
- Sport: Cycling
- Discipline: Road
- Role: Rider
- Rider type: All-rounder

Professional teams
- 1982–1983: Selle Italia–Chinol
- 1984: Murella–Rossin
- 1985: Fanini–Wührer
- 1986: Ecoflam–Jollyscarpe–BFB Bruciatori–Alfa Lum
- 1987: Gis Gelati–Jollyscarpe
- 1988–1991: Del Tongo
- 1992–1993: GB–MG Maglificio
- 1994: Mercatone Uno–Medeghini

Major wins
- Grand Tours Tour de France 1 individual stage (1992) Giro d'Italia General classification (1991) Young rider classification (1983) 8 individual stages (1985, 1986, 1988, 1991, 1992) 1 TTT stage (1988) Stage races Giro del Trentino (1984)

Franco Chioccioli (born 25 August 1959) is an Italian former professional road racing cyclist. The highlight of his career was his overall win in the 1991 Giro d'Italia.

== Career ==
From Pian di Scò in Tuscany, Chioccioli was nicknamed 'Coppino' due to his likeness in appearance to Fausto Coppi. The youngest of eight brothers, he debuted in professional cycling with Selle Italia in 1982. He had early wins at the Coppa Agostoni in 1984, at the 1984 Giro del Trentino, and the Giro del Friuli in 1985.

Chioccioli had five top-ten finishes at the Tour of Italy prior to his overall victory in the race, with three stage wins. He had placed sixth overall in 1986 and 1990, finished fifth in 1988 and 1989, and had worn the leader's pink jersey in 1988 prior to losing it in blizzard conditions to American Andy Hampsten.

Chioccioli won the 1991 Giro d'Italia ahead of compatriots Claudio Chiappucci, Massimiliano Lelli and Gianni Bugno. It was a tough race with 35 mountain climbs. He won three individual stages, an individual time trial and two in the mountains, including at the top of Marmolada, and wore the leader's maglia rosa for 19 days across the three-week race.

Defending his title at the 1992 Giro d'Italia, Chioccioli placed third overall behind an imperious Miguel Indurain and Claudio Chiappucci, his performance including a win on the penultimate stage ahead of Indurain on Mount Ologno. Chioccioli won stage 15 of the 1992 Tour de France from Le Bourg-d'Oisans to St Etienne in his debut appearance in the race, winning with a solo breakaway as the race left The Alps.

== Major results ==
1977
1st Overall Giro della Lunigiana
1981
2nd Overall Giro della Valle d'Aosta
1982
2nd Giro dell'Etna
2nd Giro dell'Appennino
4th Gran Premio Città di Camaiore
6th Overall Giro del Trentino
7th Giro di Toscana
1983
1st Young rider classification Giro d'Italia
7th Milan–San Remo
10th Overall Giro del Trentino

1st Stage 1

10th Tre Valli Varesine
1984
1st Overall Giro del Trentino

1st Stage 2

1st Coppa Agostoni
3rd Coppa Placci
3rd Giro dell'Etna
1985
1st Giro del Friuli
9th Overall Giro d'Italia

1st Stage 14

9th Overall Giro del Trentino
1986
4th Overall Giro di Puglia
5th Overall Tour de Suisse

1st Stage 6

6th Overall Giro d'Italia

1st Stage 8

10th Trofeo Pantalica
1987
1st Trofeo dello Scalatore
1st Stage 4 Giro di Puglia
2nd Giro dell'Etna
2nd Trofeo Pantalica
3rd Giro della Provincia di reggio Calabria
8th Overall Tirreno–Adriatico
8th Milan–San Remo
1988
2nd Overall Giro di Puglia

1st Stage 4

5th Overall Giro d'Italia

1st Stages 4b (TTT) & 6

6th Giro di Toscana
1989
4th Tre Valli Varesine
5th Overall Giro d'Italia
7th Giro di Toscana
1990
1st Stage 4 Giro del Trentino
6th Overall Giro d'Italia
1991
1st Overall Giro d'Italia

1st Stages 15, 17 & 20 (ITT)

1st Coppa Sabatini
2nd Road race, National Road Championships
2nd Giro del Friuli
4th Giro di Toscana
4th GP Industria & Artigianato
8th Overall Giro del Trentino
8th Coppa Placci
1992
1st Overall Euskal Bizikleta

1st Stage 5

1st Stage 15 Tour de France
1st Stage 1 Giro del Trentino
3rd Overall Giro d'Italia

1st Stage 20

8th GP Industria & Artigianato
10th Coppa Agostoni
1993
2nd Overall Euskal Bizikleta

1st Stage 5

=== Grand Tour general classification results timeline ===
Grand Tour	1982	1983	1984	1985	1986	1987	1988	1989	1990	1991	1992	1993	1994
Vuelta a España	—	—	—	—	—	—	—	—	—	—	—	—	—
Giro d'Italia	25	15	24	9	6	14	5	5	6	1	3	19	46
Tour de France	—	—	—	—	—	—	—	—	—	—	16	—	42

Legend
—	Did not compete
DNF	Did not finish
