= Stefano Allocchio =

Italian cyclist

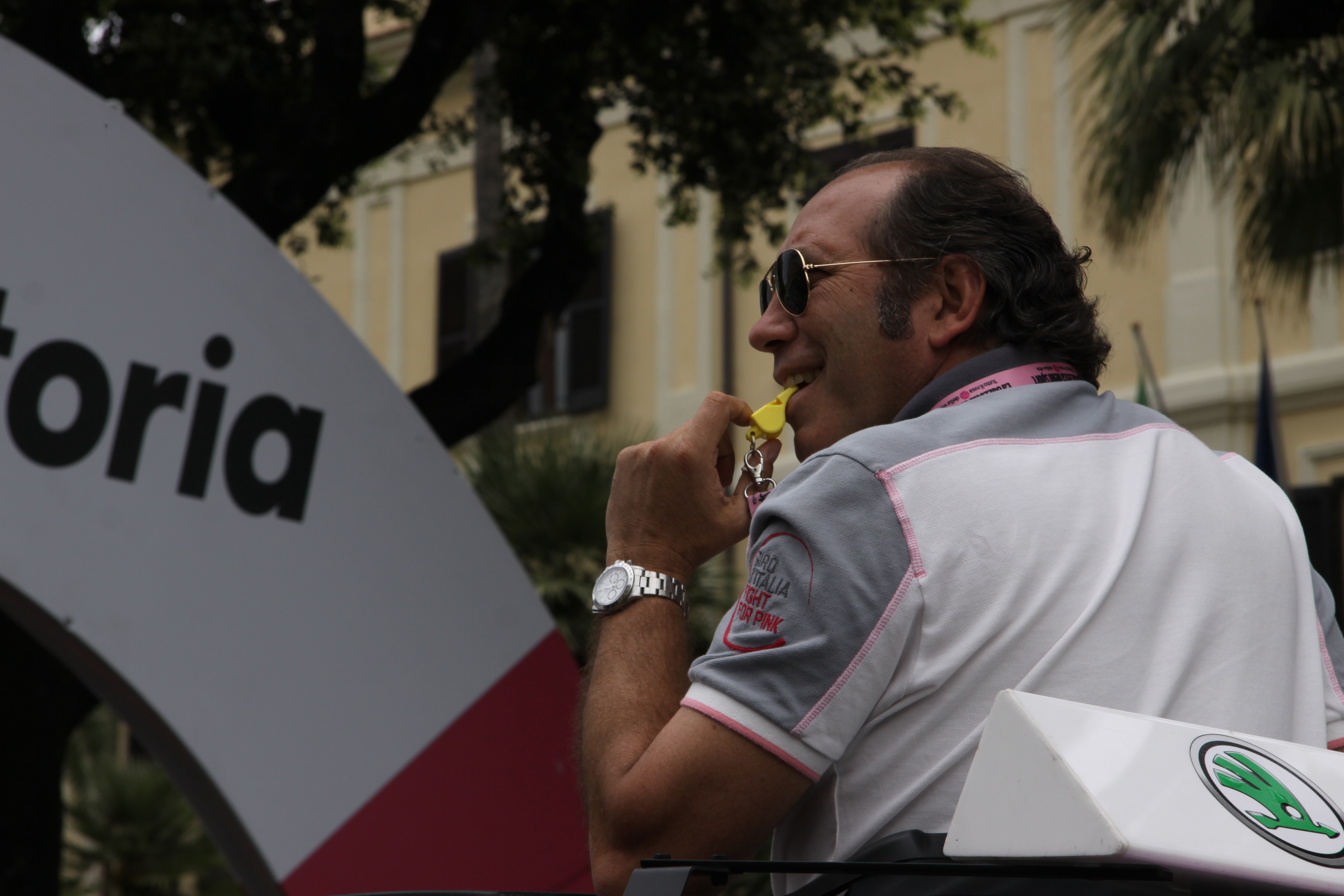
- Stefano Allocchio

Personal information
- Born: 18 March 1962 (age 64) Milan, Italy

Cycling career
- Sport: Cycling
- Current team: Retired
- Discipline: Road
- Role: Rider

Professional teams
- 1985–1986: Malvor–Bottecchia–Vaporella
- 1987–1988: Supermercati Brianzoli–Chateau d'Ax
- 1989: Malvor–Sidi
- 1990–1992: Italbonifica–Navigare
- 1993: Lampre–Polti

Major wins
- Grand Tours Giro d'Italia 4 individual stages (1985, 1990) Vuelta a España 1 individual stage (1989)

Stefano Allocchio (born 18 March 1962) is an Italian former professional racing cyclist. He rode in two editions of the Tour de France, nine editions of the Giro d'Italia and one edition of the Vuelta a España. He also competed in the points race event at the 1984 Summer Olympics.

== Major results ==
1985
Giro d'Italia

1st Stages 8a & 11

1st Stage 1 Settimana Internazionale di Coppi e Bartali
1988
1st Stage 2 Giro di Puglia
2nd Trofeo Laigueglia
1989
1st Stage 8 Vuelta a España
1st Stage 1 (ITT) Tirreno–Adriatico
1st Stage 1 Settimana Internazionale di Coppi e Bartali
1990
Giro d'Italia

1st Stages 4a & 8

1993
2nd Giro della Provincia di Reggio Calabria

=== Grand Tour general classification results timeline ===
Grand Tour	1985	1986	1987	1988	1989	1990	1991	1992	1993
Vuelta a España	—	—	—	—	137	—	—	—	—
Giro d'Italia	132	132	128	114	140	162	132	DNF	110
Tour de France	—	DNF	129	—	—	—	—	—	—

Legend
—	Did not compete
DNF	Did not finish
