= Acácio da Silva =

Portuguese cyclist (born 1961)

Personal information
- Full name: Acácio Mora da Silva
- Born: 2 January 1961 (age 65) Montalegre, Portugal

Cycling career
- Sport: Cycling
- Current team: Retired
- Discipline: Road
- Role: Rider

Amateur team
- 1980–1981: CC Dudelange

Professional teams
- 1982: Royal-Wrangler
- 1983: Eorotex–Magniflex
- 1984–1985: Malvor–Bottecchia
- 1986–1988: Kas
- 1989–1990: Carrera Jeans–Vagabond
- 1991–1993: Lotus–Festina
- 1994: Maia–Jumbo–Serrata-Beirão

Major wins
- Grand Tours Tour de France 3 individual stages (1987, 1988, 1989) Giro d'Italia 5 individual stages (1985, 1986, 1989) One-day races and Classics Züri-Metzgete (1986) Coppa Agostoni (1985) Giro dell'Emilia (1985) National Road Race Championships (1986)

Acácio Mora da Silva (born 2 January 1961 in Montalegre, Portugal) is a Portuguese former professional road bicycle racer. He was a professional from 1982 to 1994 during which he won stages in the Tour de France, the Giro d'Italia and stages in many other stage races. He won three stages in total in the Tour de France, one in 1987, one in 1988, and one in 1989. After his stage win in 1989, he wore the yellow jersey as leader of the general classification for four days. In 1986, he won the Züri-Metzgete and was also the Portuguese national road champion.

== Major results ==
1979
3rd Overall GP Général Patton
1980
1st Overall Flèche du Sud

1st Stage 1

1981
1st Stage 5 Flèche du Sud
1982
1st Tour de Kaistenberg
4th Overall Tour de Luxembourg
1983
1st Tour de Kaistenberg
6th GP du canton d'Argovie
7th Overall Tour de Luxembourg

1st Stage 4

7th Brabantse Pijl
8th Overall Tour de Suisse
1984
1st Coppa Placci
1st Tour de Kaistenberg
2nd Overall Tour de Suisse
2nd Milano–Vignola
2nd Giro del Piemonte
3rd Visp–Grächen
4th Giro dell'Emilia
5th Liège–Bastogne–Liège
5th Tour du Nord-Ouest
6th Overall Giro del Trentino

1st Stage 1

8th Giro di Romagna
10th La Flèche Wallonne
1985
1st Giro dell'Emilia
1st Coppa Ugo Agostoni
1st Stages 8b & 10 Giro d'Italia
2nd Overall Tour de Romandie

1st Stage 3

2nd Overall Tirreno–Adriatico

1st Stage 4

2nd Coppa Sabatini
4th Overall Settimana Internazionale di Coppi e Bartali
4th La Flèche Wallonne
4th Tre Valli Varesine
6th Tour du Nord-Ouest
7th Visp–Grächen
8th Overall Tour de Suisse

1st Stage 1 (ITT)

9th Liège–Bastogne–Liège
10th Critérium des As
1986
1st Road race, National Road Championships
1st Züri-Metzgete
1st Stage 3 Tour du Limousin
2nd Trofeo Pantalica
3rd Critérium des As
3rd Giro dell'Etna
4th Giro della Provincia di reggio Calabria
5th Overall Volta a Catalunya
5th Giro di Lombardia
6th Overall Super Prestige Pernod
6th Overall Tirreno–Adriatico
6th Clásica de San Sebastián
7th Overall Giro d'Italia

1st Stages 9 & 21

8th Paris–Tours
1987
1st Hegiberg-Rundfahrt
1st Stage 3 Tour de France
2nd GP Lugano
6th Overall Setmana Catalana de Ciclisme
7th Overall Tour of the Basque Country
7th Critérium des As
9th Overall Tour de Suisse
1988
1st Trofeo Luis Puig
1st Schynberg Rundfahrt
1st Stage 4 Tour de France
1st Stage 5 Tour of Galicia
3rd Overall Tour de Suisse

1st Stage 3

3rd Omloop van het Leiedal
6th Overall Critérium du Dauphiné Libéré

1st Stage 4

7th Overall Vuelta a Andalucía
10th Overall Tour of the Basque Country
10th Overall Setmana Catalana de Ciclisme
1989
Tour de France

1st Stage 1
Held Stages 1–4

Giro d'Italia

1st Stage 2
Held after Stages 3 & 10

1st GP Charly Gaul
2nd Overall GP de Sintra

1st Stage 1b (ITT)

2nd Züri-Metzgete
2nd Wartenberg Rundfahrt
10th Grand Prix des Amériques
1990
1st Prologue Tour de Luxembourg
3rd Wartenberg Rundfahrt
1992
3rd Overall Vuelta a los Valles Mineros
1994
7th GP du canton d'Argovie
9th Overall Volta ao Algarve

=== Grand Tour general classification results timeline ===
Grand Tour	1982	1983	1984	1985	1986	1987	1988	1989	1990	1991	1992	1993
Giro d'Italia	78	97	23	33	7	—	—	48	49	57	46	73
Tour de France	—	—	—	—	82	64	92	84	108	—	61	—
Vuelta a España	—	—	—	—	—	DNF	38	—	—	65	—	64
