= Emanuele Bombini =

Italian cyclist

Personal information
- Born: 2 July 1959 (age 67) San Ferdinando di Puglia, Italy

Cycling career
- Sport: Cycling
- Current team: Retired
- Discipline: Road
- Role: Rider

Professional teams
- 1981–1983: Hoonved–Bottecchia–Herdal
- 1984–1985: Del Tongo–Colnago
- 1986: Vini Ricordi–Pinarello–Sidermec
- 1987–1989: Gewiss–Bianchi
- 1990: Diana–Colnago–Animex
- 1991: Chateau d'Ax–Gatorade

Emanuele Bombini (born 2 July 1959 in San Ferdinando di Puglia) is an Italian former professional road cyclist and cycling team manager.

After retiring from racing, Bombini developed the professional-team project that became Mecair–Ballan in January 1993. Working with Mecair owner Aurelio Messina, he built the team around former world champion Moreno Argentin and recruited young former Soviet riders Evgeni Berzin and Vladislav Bobrik. Gewiss replaced Mecair as title sponsor in 1994, when Berzin won the 1994 Giro d'Italia under Bombini's management.

== Major results ==
1976
1st Coppa Collecchio
1981
2nd Giro del Lazio
3rd Giro della Romagna
3rd Gran Premio Industria e Commercio di Prato
1982
2nd Giro dell'Umbria
2nd Giro della Romagna
2nd Overall Giro di Sardegna
3rd Giro dell'Emilia
3rd Coppa Placci
1983
2nd Overall Ruota d'Oro

1st Stage 2

2nd Giro dell'Appennino
2nd Gran Premio Industria e Commercio di Prato
3rd Overall Giro del Trentino
1984
2nd Overall Ruota d'Oro
2nd Overall Giro del Trentino
3rd GP Industria & Artigianato di Larciano
1985
1st Milano–Vignola
1st Stages 2 (TTT) & 5 Giro d'Italia
1987
1st Stage 3 Coors Classic
3rd Coppa Agostoni
3rd National Road Race Championships
1988
3rd Overall Giro della Provincia di Reggio Calabria
1989
3rd Coppa Agostoni
1990
3rd Overall Settimana Ciclistica Lombarda

1st Stage 9
