= List of teams and cyclists in the 1983 Giro d'Italia =

The 1983 Giro d'Italia was the 66th edition of the Giro d'Italia, one of cycling's Grand Tours. The field consisted of 162 riders, and 140 riders finished the race.

== By rider ==
Legend
No.	Starting number worn by the rider during the Giro
Pos.	Position in the general classification
DNF	Denotes a rider who did not finish

No.	Name	Nationality	Team	Ref
1	Fiorenzo Aliverti	Italy	Alfa Lum–Olmo	
2	Mauro Angelucci	Italy	Alfa Lum–Olmo	
3	Ismael Lejarreta	Spain	Alfa Lum–Olmo	
4	Marino Lejarreta	Spain	Alfa Lum–Olmo	
5	Salvatore Maccali	Italy	Alfa Lum–Olmo	
6	Orlando Maini	Italy	Alfa Lum–Olmo	
7	Piero Onesti	Italy	Alfa Lum–Olmo	
8	Giuseppe Petito	Italy	Alfa Lum–Olmo	
9	Michael Wilson	Australia	Alfa Lum–Olmo	
11	Giancarlo Casiraghi	Italy	Atala	
12	Walter Delle Case	Italy	Atala	
13	Piergiorgio Angeli	Italy	Atala	
14	Urs Freuler	Switzerland	Atala	
15	Pierino Gavazzi	Italy	Atala	
16	Mario Noris	Italy	Atala	
17	Wladimiro Panizza	Italy	Atala	
18	Giovanni Renosto	Italy	Atala	
19	Paolo Rosola	Italy	Atala	
21	Fulvio Bertacco	Italy	Bianchi–Piaggio	
22	Silvano Contini	Italy	Bianchi–Piaggio	
23	Alessandro Paganessi	Italy	Bianchi–Piaggio	
24	Serge Parsani	Italy	Bianchi–Piaggio	
25	Valerio Piva	Italy	Bianchi–Piaggio	
26	Alfons De Wolf	Belgium	Bianchi–Piaggio	
27	Tommy Prim	Sweden	Bianchi–Piaggio	
28	Alf Segersäll	Sweden	Bianchi–Piaggio	
29	Ennio Vanotti	Italy	Bianchi–Piaggio	
31	Mario Beccia	Italy	Malvor–Bottecchia	
32	Antonio Bevilacqua	Italy	Malvor–Bottecchia	
33	Leonardo Bevilacqua	Italy	Malvor–Bottecchia	
34	Emanuele Bombini	Italy	Malvor–Bottecchia	
35	Silvestro Milani	Italy	Malvor–Bottecchia	
36	Daniel Gisiger	Switzerland	Malvor–Bottecchia	
37	Vinko Poloncic	Yugoslavia	Malvor–Bottecchia	
38	Robert Dill-Bundi	Switzerland	Malvor–Bottecchia	
39	Jorg Bruggmann	Switzerland	Malvor–Bottecchia	
41	Giuseppe Saronni	Italy	Del Tongo–Colnago	
42	Claudio Bortolotto	Italy	Del Tongo–Colnago	
43	Roberto Ceruti	Italy	Del Tongo–Colnago	
44	Leonardo Natale	Italy	Del Tongo–Colnago	
45	Maurizio Piovani	Italy	Del Tongo–Colnago	
46	Rudy Pevenage	Belgium	Del Tongo–Colnago	
47	Sergio Santimaria	Italy	Del Tongo–Colnago	
48	Dietrich Thurau	West Germany	Del Tongo–Colnago	
49	Guido Van Calster	Belgium	Del Tongo–Colnago	
51	Carmelo Barone	Italy	Dromedario–Alan–Sidermec	
52	Franco Conti	Italy	Dromedario–Alan–Sidermec	
53	Giuseppe Faraca	Italy	Dromedario–Alan–Sidermec	
54	Ettore Bazzichi	Italy	Dromedario–Alan–Sidermec	
55	Giuseppe Montella	Italy	Dromedario–Alan–Sidermec	
56	Cesare Cipollini	Italy	Dromedario–Alan–Sidermec	
57	Claudio Savini	Italy	Dromedario–Alan–Sidermec	
58	Peter Kehl	West Germany	Dromedario–Alan–Sidermec	
59	Luigi Trevellin	Italy	Dromedario–Alan–Sidermec	
61	Frank Hoste	Belgium	Europ Decor–Dries	
62	Marc Sergeant	Belgium	Europ Decor–Dries	
63	Jan Bogaert	Belgium	Europ Decor–Dries	
64	Marc Somers	Belgium	Europ Decor–Dries	
65	Jan Nevens	Belgium	Europ Decor–Dries	
66	Jos Jacobs	Belgium	Europ Decor–Dries	
67	Luc Govaerts	Belgium	Europ Decor–Dries	
68	Étienne De Beule	Belgium	Europ Decor–Dries	
69	Dirk Wayenberg	Belgium	Europ Decor–Dries	
71	Faustino Rupérez	Spain	Zor–Gemeaz Cusin	
72	Alberto Fernández	Spain	Zor–Gemeaz Cusin	
73	Juan Fernández	Spain	Zor–Gemeaz Cusin	
74	Pedro Muñoz	Spain	Zor–Gemeaz Cusin	
75	Álvaro Pino	Spain	Zor–Gemeaz Cusin	
76	José López Cerrón	Spain	Zor–Gemeaz Cusin	
77	Eduardo Chozas	Spain	Zor–Gemeaz Cusin	
78	Ángel Camarillo	Spain	Zor–Gemeaz Cusin	
79	Jesús Ibáñez Loyo	Spain	Zor–Gemeaz Cusin	
81	Francesco Moser	Italy	Gis Gelati	
82	Marino Amadori	Italy	Gis Gelati	
83	Simone Fraccaro	Italy	Gis Gelati	
84	Pierino Ghibaudo	Italy	Gis Gelati	
85	Czesław Lang	Poland	Gis Gelati	
86	Palmiro Masciarelli	Italy	Gis Gelati	
87	Dante Morandi	Italy	Gis Gelati	
88	Ennio Salvador	Italy	Gis Gelati	
89	Fabrizio Verza	Italy	Gis Gelati	
91	Eddy Schepers	Belgium	Hoonved–Almoda–Perlav	
92	Walter Schoonjans	Belgium	Hoonved–Almoda–Perlav	
93	Marc Van Den Brande	Belgium	Hoonved–Almoda–Perlav	
94	Maurice Van Heer	Belgium	Hoonved–Almoda–Perlav	
95	Hans Neumayer	West Germany	Hoonved–Almoda–Perlav	
96	Ludo Loos	Belgium	Hoonved–Almoda–Perlav	
97	Christian Wauters	Belgium	Hoonved–Almoda–Perlav	
98	Herman Crabbe	Belgium	Hoonved–Almoda–Perlav	
99	Patrick Hermans	Belgium	Hoonved–Almoda–Perlav	
101	Giovanni Battaglin	Italy	Inoxpran	
102	Guido Bontempi	Italy	Inoxpran	
103	Alfredo Chinetti	Italy	Inoxpran	
104	Bruno Leali	Italy	Inoxpran	
105	Luciano Loro	Italy	Inoxpran	
106	Valerio Lualdi	Italy	Inoxpran	
107	Glauco Santoni	Italy	Inoxpran	
108	Carlo Tonon	Italy	Inoxpran	
109	Roberto Visentini	Italy	Inoxpran	
111	Stefan Mutter	Switzerland	Eorotex–Magniflex	
112	Bruno Wolfer	Switzerland	Eorotex–Magniflex	
113	Siegfried Hekimi	Switzerland	Eorotex–Magniflex	
114	Josef Wehrli	Switzerland	Eorotex–Magniflex	
115	Jostein Wilmann	Norway	Eorotex–Magniflex	
116	Paul Wellens	Belgium	Eorotex–Magniflex	
117	Acácio da Silva	Portugal	Eorotex–Magniflex	
118	Gerhard Zadrobilek	Austria	Eorotex–Magniflex	
119	Harald Maier	Austria	Eorotex–Magniflex	
121	Daniele Antinori	Italy	Mareno–Wilier Triestina	
122	Nazzareno Berto	Italy	Mareno–Wilier Triestina	
123	Giuliano Biatta	Italy	Mareno–Wilier Triestina	
124	Giocondo Dalla Rizza	Italy	Mareno–Wilier Triestina	
125	Walter Clivati	Italy	Mareno–Wilier Triestina	
126	Francesco Masi	Italy	Mareno–Wilier Triestina	
127	Giuliano Pavanello	Italy	Mareno–Wilier Triestina	
128	Gianmarco Saccani	Italy	Mareno–Wilier Triestina	
129	Massimo Santambrogio	Italy	Mareno–Wilier Triestina	
131	Lucien Van Impe	Belgium	Metauro Mobili–Pinarello	
132	Vittorio Algeri	Italy	Metauro Mobili–Pinarello	
133	Marco Groppo	Italy	Metauro Mobili–Pinarello	
134	Riccardo Magrini	Italy	Metauro Mobili–Pinarello	
135	Luciano Rabottini	Italy	Metauro Mobili–Pinarello	
136	Frits Pirard	Netherlands	Metauro Mobili–Pinarello	
137	Alfio Vandi	Italy	Metauro Mobili–Pinarello	
138	Flavio Zappi	Italy	Metauro Mobili–Pinarello	
139	Pierangelo Bincoletto	Italy	Metauro Mobili–Pinarello	
141	Gianbattista Baronchelli	Italy	Sammontana–Campagnolo	
142	Moreno Argentin	Italy	Sammontana–Campagnolo	
143	Claudio Corti	Italy	Sammontana–Campagnolo	
144	Fiorenzo Favero	Italy	Sammontana–Campagnolo	
145	Raniero Gradi	Italy	Sammontana–Campagnolo	
146	Marino Polini	Italy	Sammontana–Campagnolo	
147	Amilcare Sgalbazzi	Italy	Sammontana–Campagnolo	
148	Claudio Torelli	Italy	Sammontana–Campagnolo	
149	Jesper Worre	Denmark	Sammontana–Campagnolo	
151	Francesco Caneva	Italy	Termolan	
152	Daniele Caroli	Italy	Termolan	
153	Davide Cassani	Italy	Termolan	
154	René Koppert	Netherlands	Termolan	
155	Giuseppe Lanzoni	Italy	Termolan	
156	Sven-Åke Nilsson	Sweden	Termolan	
157	Claudio Girlanda	Italy	Termolan	
158	Silvano Riccò	Italy	Termolan	
159	Erminio Rizzi	Italy	Termolan	
161	Gregor Braun	West Germany	Vivi–Benotto	
162	Mario Bonzi	Italy	Vivi–Benotto	
163	Franco Chioccioli	Italy	Vivi–Benotto	
164	Corrado Donadio	Italy	Vivi–Benotto	
165	Gabriele Landoni	Italy	Vivi–Benotto	
166	Giuseppe Passuello	Italy	Vivi–Benotto	
167	Graziano Salvietti	Italy	Vivi–Benotto	
168	Giovanni Viero	Italy	Vivi–Benotto	
169	Gianluigi Zuanel	Italy	Vivi–Benotto	
171	Dominique Arnaud	France	Wolber–Spidel	
172	Jean-René Bernaudeau	France	Wolber–Spidel	
173	Patrick Bonnet	France	Wolber–Spidel	
174	Graham Jones	Great Britain	Wolber–Spidel	
175	Jean-François Rodriguez	France	Wolber–Spidel	
176	Christian Seznec	France	Wolber–Spidel	
177	Pierre-Raymond Villemiane	France	Wolber–Spidel	
178	Claude Vincendeau	France	Wolber–Spidel	
179	Fabien De Vooght	France	Wolber–Spidel	
