= 1983 Giro d'Italia, Prologue to Stage 11 =

Cycling race stages

The 1983 Giro d'Italia was the 66th edition of the Giro d'Italia, one of cycling's Grand Tours. The Giro began in Brescia, with a team time trial on 13 May, after the annulment of the prologue individual time trial the day before. Stage 11 occurred on 23 May with a stage to Pietrasanta, followed by a rest day. The race finished in Udine on 5 June.

== Prologue ==
12 May 1983 — ~~Brescia, (ITT)~~

The stage was cancelled because of a demonstration by metallurgists.

== Stage 1 ==
13 May 1983 — Brescia to Mantua, 70 km (43 mi) (TTT)

Stage 1 result

| Rank | Team | Time |
|---|---|---|
| 1 | Bianchi–Piaggio | 1h 17' 48" |
| 2 | Atala | + 32" |
| 3 | Gis Gelati | + 38" |
| 4 | Sammontana–Campagnolo | + 46" |
| 5 | Del Tongo–Colnago | + 48" |
| 6 | Inoxpran | + 1' 26" |
| 7 | Metauro Mobili–Pinarello | + 1' 35" |
| 8 | Alfa Lum–Olmo | + 1' 53" |
| 9 | Vivi–Benotto | + 2' 10" |
| 10 | Europ Decor–Dries | + 2' 19" |

General classification after Stage 1

| Rank | Rider | Team | Time |
|---|---|---|---|
| 1 | Tommy Prim (SWE) | Bianchi–Piaggio | 1h 17' 48" |
| =2 | Ennio Vanotti (ITA) | Bianchi–Piaggio | s.t. |
| =2 | Alf Segersäll (SWE) | Bianchi–Piaggio | s.t. |
| =2 | Alessandro Paganessi (ITA) | Bianchi–Piaggio | s.t. |
| =2 | Silvano Contini (ITA) | Bianchi–Piaggio | s.t. |
| =2 | Serge Parsani (ITA) | Bianchi–Piaggio | s.t. |
| =2 | Valerio Piva (ITA) | Bianchi–Piaggio | s.t. |

== Stage 2 ==
14 May 1983 — Mantua to Comacchio, 192 km (119 mi)

Stage 2 result

| Rank | Rider | Team | Time |
|---|---|---|---|
| 1 | Guido Bontempi (ITA) | Inoxpran | 5h 13' 54" |
| 2 | Urs Freuler (SUI) | Atala | s.t. |
| 3 | Frank Hoste (BEL) | Europ Decor–Dries | s.t. |
| 4 | Paolo Rosola (ITA) | Atala | s.t. |
| 5 | Giuseppe Saronni (ITA) | Del Tongo–Colnago | s.t. |
| 6 | Silvano Riccò (ITA) | Termolan | s.t. |
| 7 | Frits Pirard (NED) | Metauro Mobili–Pinarello | s.t. |
| 8 | Stefan Mutter (SUI) | Eorotex–Magniflex | s.t. |
| 9 | Robert Dill-Bundi (SUI) | Malvor–Bottecchia | s.t. |
| 10 | Harald Maier (AUT) | Eorotex–Magniflex | s.t. |

General classification after Stage 2

| Rank | Rider | Team | Time |
|---|---|---|---|
| 1 | Urs Freuler (SUI) | Atala | 6h 29' 02" |
| 2 | Tommy Prim (SWE) | Bianchi–Piaggio | + 10" |
| 3 | Valerio Piva (ITA) | Bianchi–Piaggio | s.t. |
| 4 | Serge Parsani (ITA) | Bianchi–Piaggio | s.t. |
| 5 | Ennio Vanotti (ITA) | Bianchi–Piaggio | s.t. |
| 6 | Silvano Contini (ITA) | Bianchi–Piaggio | s.t. |
| 7 | Alf Segersäll (SWE) | Bianchi–Piaggio | s.t. |
| 8 | Alessandro Paganessi (ITA) | Bianchi–Piaggio | s.t. |
| 9 | Paolo Rosola (ITA) | Atala | + 15" |
| 10 | Giovanni Renosto (ITA) | Atala | + 20" |

== Stage 3 ==
15 May 1983 — Comacchio to Fano, 148 km (92 mi)

Stage 3 result

| Rank | Rider | Team | Time |
|---|---|---|---|
| 1 | Paolo Rosola (ITA) | Atala | 3h 29' 16" |
| 2 | Pierino Gavazzi (ITA) | Atala | s.t. |
| 3 | Gianmarco Saccani (ITA) | Mareno–Wilier Triestina | s.t. |
| 4 | Giuliano Pavanello (ITA) | Mareno–Wilier Triestina | s.t. |
| 5 | Dietrich Thurau (FRG) | Del Tongo–Colnago | s.t. |
| 6 | Pierino Ghibaudo (ITA) | Gis Gelati | s.t. |
| 7 | Pierangelo Bincoletto (ITA) | Metauro Mobili–Pinarello | s.t. |
| 8 | Sergio Santimaria (ITA) | Del Tongo–Colnago | s.t. |
| 9 | Silvano Contini (ITA) | Bianchi–Piaggio | s.t. |
| 10 | Riccardo Magrini (ITA) | Metauro Mobili–Pinarello | s.t. |

General classification after Stage 3

| Rank | Rider | Team | Time |
|---|---|---|---|
| 1 | Paolo Rosola (ITA) | Atala | 9h 58' 03" |
| 2 | Pierino Gavazzi (ITA) | Atala | + 15" |
| 3 | Serge Parsani (ITA) | Bianchi–Piaggio | + 25" |
| 4 | Silvano Contini (ITA) | Bianchi–Piaggio | s.t. |
| 5 | Urs Freuler (SUI) | Atala | s.t. |
| 6 | Tommy Prim (SWE) | Bianchi–Piaggio | + 52" |
| 7 | Valerio Piva (ITA) | Bianchi–Piaggio | s.t. |
| 8 | Ennio Vanotti (ITA) | Bianchi–Piaggio | s.t. |
| 9 | Alf Segersäll (SWE) | Bianchi–Piaggio | s.t. |
| 10 | Alessandro Paganessi (ITA) | Bianchi–Piaggio | + 55" |

== Stage 4 ==
16 May 1983 — Pesaro to Todi, 180 km (110 mi)

Stage 4 result

| Rank | Rider | Team | Time |
|---|---|---|---|
| 1 | Giuseppe Saronni (ITA) | Del Tongo–Colnago | 5h 19' 00" |
| 2 | Moreno Argentin (ITA) | Sammontana–Campagnolo | s.t. |
| 3 | Michael Wilson (AUS) | Alfa Lum–Olmo | s.t. |
| 4 | Mario Beccia (ITA) | Malvor–Bottecchia | s.t. |
| 5 | Stefan Mutter (SUI) | Eorotex–Magniflex | + 3" |
| 6 | Riccardo Magrini (ITA) | Metauro Mobili–Pinarello | s.t. |
| 7 | Jean-François Rodriguez (FRA) | Wolber–Spidel | + 5" |
| 8 | Francesco Moser (ITA) | Gis Gelati | s.t. |
| 9 | Lucien Van Impe (BEL) | Metauro Mobili–Pinarello | s.t. |
| 10 | Eduardo Chozas (ESP) | Zor–Gemeaz Cusin | s.t. |

General classification after Stage 4

| Rank | Rider | Team | Time |
|---|---|---|---|
| 1 | Paolo Rosola (ITA) | Atala | 16h 17' 21" |
| 2 | Silvano Contini (ITA) | Bianchi–Piaggio | + 12" |
| 3 | Tommy Prim (SWE) | Bianchi–Piaggio | + 39" |
| 4 | Gianbattista Baronchelli (ITA) | Sammontana–Campagnolo | + 42" |
| 5 | Giuseppe Saronni (ITA) | Del Tongo–Colnago | + 44" |
| 6 | Moreno Argentin (ITA) | Sammontana–Campagnolo | s.t. |
| 7 | Wladimiro Panizza (ITA) | Atala | + 49" |
| 8 | Dietrich Thurau (FRG) | Del Tongo–Colnago | s.t. |
| 9 | Valerio Piva (ITA) | Bianchi–Piaggio | s.t. |
| 10 | Alessandro Paganessi (ITA) | Bianchi–Piaggio | + 52" |

== Stage 5 ==
17 May 1983 — Terni to Vasto, 269 km (167 mi)

Stage 5 result

| Rank | Rider | Team | Time |
|---|---|---|---|
| 1 | Eduardo Chozas (ESP) | Zor–Gemeaz Cusin | 6h 15' 25" |
| 2 | Vittorio Algeri (ITA) | Metauro Mobili–Pinarello | + 21" |
| 3 | Giuseppe Saronni (ITA) | Del Tongo–Colnago | + 24" |
| 4 | Franco Chioccioli (ITA) | Vivi–Benotto | s.t. |
| 5 | Stefan Mutter (SUI) | Eorotex–Magniflex | s.t. |
| 6 | Gianbattista Baronchelli (ITA) | Sammontana–Campagnolo | s.t. |
| 7 | Emanuele Bombini (ITA) | Malvor–Bottecchia | s.t. |
| 8 | Harald Maier (AUT) | Eorotex–Magniflex | s.t. |
| 9 | Jean-François Rodriguez (FRA) | Wolber–Spidel | s.t. |
| 10 | Marino Lejarreta (ESP) | Alfa Lum–Olmo | s.t. |

General classification after Stage 5

| Rank | Rider | Team | Time |
|---|---|---|---|
| 1 | Silvano Contini (ITA) | Bianchi–Piaggio | 21h 33' 22" |
| 2 | Giuseppe Saronni (ITA) | Del Tongo–Colnago | + 22" |
| 3 | Tommy Prim (SWE) | Bianchi–Piaggio | + 27" |
| 4 | Gianbattista Baronchelli (ITA) | Sammontana–Campagnolo | + 30" |
| 5 | Wladimiro Panizza (ITA) | Atala | + 37" |
| 6 | Dietrich Thurau (FRG) | Del Tongo–Colnago | + 40" |
| 7 | Alessandro Paganessi (ITA) | Bianchi–Piaggio | s.t. |
| 8 | Francesco Moser (ITA) | Gis Gelati | + 47" |
| 9 | Fabrizio Verza (ITA) | Gis Gelati | s.t. |
| 10 | Giovanni Battaglin (ITA) | Inoxpran | + 50" |

== Stage 6 ==
18 May 1983 — Vasto to Campitello Matese, 145 km (90 mi)

Stage 6 result

| Rank | Rider | Team | Time |
|---|---|---|---|
| 1 | Alberto Fernández (ESP) | Zor–Gemeaz Cusin | 3h 50' 07" |
| 2 | Giuseppe Saronni (ITA) | Del Tongo–Colnago | + 23" |
| 3 | Franco Chioccioli (ITA) | Vivi–Benotto | s.t. |
| 4 | Lucien Van Impe (BEL) | Metauro Mobili–Pinarello | s.t. |
| 5 | Faustino Rupérez (ESP) | Zor–Gemeaz Cusin | s.t. |
| 6 | Giovanni Battaglin (ITA) | Inoxpran | s.t. |
| 7 | Eddy Schepers (BEL) | Hoonved–Almoda–Perlav | s.t. |
| 8 | Mario Beccia (ITA) | Malvor–Bottecchia | s.t. |
| 9 | Jostein Wilmann (NOR) | Eorotex–Magniflex | s.t. |
| 10 | Dietrich Thurau (FRG) | Del Tongo–Colnago | s.t. |

General classification after Stage 6

| Rank | Rider | Team | Time |
|---|---|---|---|
| 1 | Silvano Contini (ITA) | Bianchi–Piaggio | 25h 23' 52" |
| 2 | Giuseppe Saronni (ITA) | Del Tongo–Colnago | + 2" |
| 3 | Wladimiro Panizza (ITA) | Atala | + 37" |
| 4 | Dietrich Thurau (FRG) | Del Tongo–Colnago | + 40" |
| 5 | Giovanni Battaglin (ITA) | Inoxpran | + 50" |
| 6 | Gianbattista Baronchelli (ITA) | Sammontana–Campagnolo | + 59" |
| 7 | Eduardo Chozas (ESP) | Zor–Gemeaz Cusin | + 1' 06" |
| 8 | Marino Lejarreta (ESP) | Alfa Lum–Olmo | + 1' 10" |
| 9 | Fabrizio Verza (ITA) | Gis Gelati | + 1' 16" |
| 10 | Roberto Visentini (ITA) | Inoxpran | + 1' 17" |

== Stage 7 ==
19 May 1983 — Campitello Matese to Salerno, 216 km (134 mi)

Stage 7 result

| Rank | Rider | Team | Time |
|---|---|---|---|
| 1 | Moreno Argentin (ITA) | Sammontana–Campagnolo | 5h 57' 20" |
| 2 | Emanuele Bombini (ITA) | Malvor–Bottecchia | + 1" |
| 3 | Giuseppe Saronni (ITA) | Del Tongo–Colnago | s.t. |
| 4 | Pierino Gavazzi (ITA) | Atala | s.t. |
| 5 | Francesco Moser (ITA) | Gis Gelati | s.t. |
| 6 | Stefan Mutter (SUI) | Eorotex–Magniflex | s.t. |
| 7 | Alfons De Wolf (BEL) | Bianchi–Piaggio | s.t. |
| 8 | Silvano Riccò (ITA) | Termolan | s.t. |
| 9 | Flavio Zappi (ITA) | Metauro Mobili–Pinarello | s.t. |
| 10 | Luc Govaerts (BEL) | Europ Decor–Dries | s.t. |

General classification after Stage 7

| Rank | Rider | Team | Time |
|---|---|---|---|
| 1 | Giuseppe Saronni (ITA) | Del Tongo–Colnago | 31h 21' 12" |
| 2 | Silvano Contini (ITA) | Bianchi–Piaggio | + 8" |
| 3 | Wladimiro Panizza (ITA) | Atala | + 45" |
| 4 | Dietrich Thurau (FRG) | Del Tongo–Colnago | + 48" |
| 5 | Giovanni Battaglin (ITA) | Inoxpran | + 58" |
| 6 | Gianbattista Baronchelli (ITA) | Sammontana–Campagnolo | + 1' 07" |
| 7 | Eduardo Chozas (ESP) | Zor–Gemeaz Cusin | + 1' 14" |
| 8 | Marino Lejarreta (ESP) | Alfa Lum–Olmo | + 1' 18" |
| 9 | Fabrizio Verza (ITA) | Gis Gelati | + 1' 24" |
| 10 | Roberto Visentini (ITA) | Inoxpran | + 1' 25" |

== Stage 8 ==
20 May 1983 — Salerno to Terracina, 212 km (132 mi)

Stage 8 result

| Rank | Rider | Team | Time |
|---|---|---|---|
| 1 | Guido Bontempi (ITA) | Inoxpran | 5h 42' 11" |
| 2 | Frank Hoste (BEL) | Europ Decor–Dries | s.t. |
| 3 | Urs Freuler (SUI) | Atala | s.t. |
| 4 | Pierino Gavazzi (ITA) | Atala | s.t. |
| 5 | Stefan Mutter (SUI) | Eorotex–Magniflex | s.t. |
| 6 | Moreno Argentin (ITA) | Sammontana–Campagnolo | s.t. |
| 7 | Giuliano Pavanello (ITA) | Mareno–Wilier Triestina | s.t. |
| 8 | Paolo Rosola (ITA) | Atala | s.t. |
| 9 | Jan Bogaert (BEL) | Europ Decor–Dries | s.t. |
| 10 | Claudio Girlanda (ITA) | Termolan | s.t. |

General classification after Stage 8

| Rank | Rider | Team | Time |
|---|---|---|---|
| 1 | Giuseppe Saronni (ITA) | Del Tongo–Colnago | 37h 03' 31" |
| 2 | Silvano Contini (ITA) | Bianchi–Piaggio | + 8" |
| 3 | Wladimiro Panizza (ITA) | Atala | + 45" |
| 4 | Dietrich Thurau (FRG) | Del Tongo–Colnago | + 48" |
| 5 | Giovanni Battaglin (ITA) | Inoxpran | + 58" |
| 6 | Gianbattista Baronchelli (ITA) | Sammontana–Campagnolo | + 1' 07" |
| 7 | Eduardo Chozas (ESP) | Zor–Gemeaz Cusin | + 1' 14" |
| 8 | Marino Lejarreta (ESP) | Alfa Lum–Olmo | + 1' 18" |
| 9 | Fabrizio Verza (ITA) | Gis Gelati | + 1' 24" |
| 10 | Roberto Visentini (ITA) | Inoxpran | + 1' 25" |

== Stage 9 ==
21 May 1983 — Terracina to Montefiascone, 225 km (140 mi)

Stage 9 result

| Rank | Rider | Team | Time |
|---|---|---|---|
| 1 | Riccardo Magrini (ITA) | Metauro Mobili–Pinarello | 5h 50' 57" |
| 2 | Marino Lejarreta (ESP) | Alfa Lum–Olmo | + 3" |
| 3 | Moreno Argentin (ITA) | Sammontana–Campagnolo | + 9" |
| 4 | Vittorio Algeri (ITA) | Metauro Mobili–Pinarello | s.t. |
| 5 | Roberto Visentini (ITA) | Inoxpran | + 11" |
| 6 | Mario Beccia (ITA) | Malvor–Bottecchia | s.t. |
| 7 | Simone Fraccaro (ITA) | Gis Gelati | + 14" |
| 8 | Patrick Bonnet (FRA) | Wolber–Spidel | s.t. |
| 9 | Graham Jones (GBR) | Wolber–Spidel | s.t. |
| 10 | Francesco Moser (ITA) | Gis Gelati | s.t. |

General classification after Stage 9

| Rank | Rider | Team | Time |
|---|---|---|---|
| 1 | Giuseppe Saronni (ITA) | Del Tongo–Colnago | 42h 54' 42" |
| 2 | Silvano Contini (ITA) | Bianchi–Piaggio | + 8" |
| 3 | Wladimiro Panizza (ITA) | Atala | + 45" |
| 4 | Marino Lejarreta (ESP) | Alfa Lum–Olmo | + 47" |
| 5 | Dietrich Thurau (FRG) | Del Tongo–Colnago | + 48" |
| 6 | Giovanni Battaglin (ITA) | Inoxpran | + 58" |
| 7 | Gianbattista Baronchelli (ITA) | Sammontana–Campagnolo | + 1' 07" |
| 8 | Eduardo Chozas (ESP) | Zor–Gemeaz Cusin | + 1' 14" |
| 9 | Roberto Visentini (ITA) | Inoxpran | + 1' 22" |
| 10 | Fabrizio Verza (ITA) | Gis Gelati | + 1' 24" |

== Stage 10 ==
22 May 1983 — Montefiascone to Bibbiena, 232 km (144 mi)

Stage 10 result

| Rank | Rider | Team | Time |
|---|---|---|---|
| 1 | Palmiro Masciarelli (ITA) | Gis Gelati | 6h 00' 53" |
| 2 | Siegfried Hekimi (SUI) | Eorotex–Magniflex | s.t. |
| 3 | Patrick Bonnet (ITA) | Wolber–Spidel | + 1' 28" |
| 4 | Fulvio Bertacco (ITA) | Bianchi–Piaggio | + 1' 33" |
| 5 | Giuseppe Saronni (ITA) | Del Tongo–Colnago | + 4' 44" |
| 6 | Salvatore Maccali (ITA) | Alfa Lum–Olmo | s.t. |
| 7 | Francesco Moser (ITA) | Gis Gelati | s.t. |
| 8 | Acácio da Silva (POR) | Eorotex–Magniflex | s.t. |
| 9 | Moreno Argentin (ITA) | Sammontana–Campagnolo | s.t. |
| 10 | Jean-René Bernaudeau (FRA) | Wolber–Spidel | s.t. |

General classification after Stage 10

| Rank | Rider | Team | Time |
|---|---|---|---|
| 1 | Giuseppe Saronni (ITA) | Del Tongo–Colnago | 49h 00' 19" |
| 2 | Silvano Contini (ITA) | Bianchi–Piaggio | + 8" |
| 3 | Wladimiro Panizza (ITA) | Atala | + 45" |
| 4 | Marino Lejarreta (ESP) | Alfa Lum–Olmo | + 47" |
| 5 | Dietrich Thurau (FRG) | Del Tongo–Colnago | + 48" |
| 6 | Giovanni Battaglin (ITA) | Inoxpran | + 58" |
| 7 | Gianbattista Baronchelli (ITA) | Sammontana–Campagnolo | + 1' 07" |
| 8 | Eduardo Chozas (ESP) | Zor–Gemeaz Cusin | + 1' 14" |
| 9 | Roberto Visentini (ITA) | Inoxpran | + 1' 22" |
| 10 | Fabrizio Verza (ITA) | Gis Gelati | + 1' 24" |

== Stage 11 ==
23 May 1983 — Bibbiena to Pietrasanta, 202 km (126 mi)

Stage 11 result

| Rank | Rider | Team | Time |
|---|---|---|---|
| 1 | Lucien Van Impe (BEL) | Metauro Mobili–Pinarello | 5h 36' 25" |
| 2 | Pedro Muñoz (ESP) | Zor–Gemeaz Cusin | + 1" |
| 3 | Marino Lejarreta (ESP) | Alfa Lum–Olmo | s.t. |
| 4 | Roberto Visentini (ITA) | Inoxpran | s.t. |
| 5 | Moreno Argentin (ITA) | Sammontana–Campagnolo | + 7" |
| 6 | Eddy Schepers (BEL) | Hoonved–Almoda–Perlav | s.t. |
| 7 | Giuseppe Saronni (ITA) | Del Tongo–Colnago | + 8" |
| 8 | Jean-René Bernaudeau (FRA) | Wolber–Spidel | s.t. |
| 9 | Giovanni Battaglin (ITA) | Inoxpran | s.t. |
| 10 | Alfio Vandi (ITA) | Metauro Mobili–Pinarello | s.t. |

General classification after Stage 11

| Rank | Rider | Team | Time |
|---|---|---|---|
| 1 | Giuseppe Saronni (ITA) | Del Tongo–Colnago | 54h 36' 52" |
| 2 | Marino Lejarreta (ESP) | Alfa Lum–Olmo | + 30" |
| 3 | Wladimiro Panizza (ITA) | Atala | + 45" |
| 4 | Dietrich Thurau (FRG) | Del Tongo–Colnago | + 48" |
| 5 | Lucien Van Impe (BEL) | Metauro Mobili–Pinarello | + 52" |
| 6 | Silvano Contini (ITA) | Bianchi–Piaggio | + 56" |
| 7 | Giovanni Battaglin (ITA) | Inoxpran | + 58" |
| 8 | Gianbattista Baronchelli (ITA) | Sammontana–Campagnolo | + 1' 07" |
| 9 | Roberto Visentini (ITA) | Inoxpran | + 1' 10" |
| 10 | Fabrizio Verza (ITA) | Gis Gelati | + 1' 24" |

== Rest day 1 ==
24 May 1983
