= 1983 Giro d'Italia, Stage 12 to Stage 22 =

Cycling race stages

The 1983 Giro d'Italia was the 66th edition of the Giro d'Italia, one of cycling's Grand Tours. The Giro began in Brescia, with a team time trial on 13 May, after the annulment of the prologue individual time trial the day before. Stage 12 occurred on 25 May with a stage from Pietrasanta. The race finished in Udine on 5 June.

== Stage 12 ==
25 May 1983 — Pietrasanta to Reggio Emilia, 180 km (110 mi)

Stage 12 result

Rank	Rider	Team	Time
1	Alf Segersäll (SWE)	Bianchi–Piaggio	4h 24' 10"
2	Giuseppe Saronni (ITA)	Del Tongo–Colnago	+ 22"
3	Pierino Gavazzi (ITA)	Atala	s.t.
4	Frank Hoste (BEL)	Europ Decor–Dries	s.t.
5	Stefan Mutter (SUI)	Eorotex–Magniflex	s.t.
6	Francesco Moser (ITA)	Gis Gelati	s.t.
7	Giuliano Pavanello (ITA)	Mareno–Wilier Triestina	s.t.
8	Urs Freuler (SUI)	Atala	s.t.
9	Pierangelo Bincoletto (ITA)	Metauro Mobili–Pinarello	s.t.
10	Alfons De Wolf (BEL)	Bianchi–Piaggio	s.t.

General classification after Stage 12

Rank	Rider	Team	Time
1	Giuseppe Saronni (ITA)	Del Tongo–Colnago	59h 01' 04"
2	Marino Lejarreta (ESP)	Alfa Lum–Olmo	+ 50"
3	Wladimiro Panizza (ITA)	Atala	+ 1' 05"
4	Dietrich Thurau (FRG)	Del Tongo–Colnago	+ 1' 08"
5	Lucien Van Impe (BEL)	Metauro Mobili–Pinarello	+ 1' 12"
6	Silvano Contini (ITA)	Bianchi–Piaggio	+ 1' 16"
7	Giovanni Battaglin (ITA)	Inoxpran	+ 1' 18"
8	Gianbattista Baronchelli (ITA)	Sammontana–Campagnolo	+ 1' 27"
9	Roberto Visentini (ITA)	Inoxpran	+ 1' 30"
10	Fabrizio Verza (ITA)	Gis Gelati	+ 1' 44"

== Stage 13 ==
26 May 1983 — Reggio Emilia to Parma, 38 km (24 mi) (ITT)

Stage 13 result

Rank	Rider	Team	Time
1	Giuseppe Saronni (ITA)	Del Tongo–Colnago	48' 49"
2	Roberto Visentini (ITA)	Inoxpran	+ 30"
3	Urs Freuler (SUI)	Atala	+ 1' 01"
4	Gregor Braun (FRG)	Vivi–Benotto	+ 1' 09"
5	Tommy Prim (SWE)	Bianchi–Piaggio	s.t.
6	Dietrich Thurau (FRG)	Del Tongo–Colnago	+ 1' 28"
7	Silvano Contini (ITA)	Bianchi–Piaggio	+ 1' 52"
8	Daniel Gisiger (SUI)	Malvor–Bottecchia	+ 2' 00"
9	Claudio Torelli (ITA)	Sammontana–Campagnolo	+ 2' 01"
10	Lucien Van Impe (BEL)	Metauro Mobili–Pinarello	+ 2' 04"

General classification after Stage 13

Rank	Rider	Team	Time
1	Giuseppe Saronni (ITA)	Del Tongo–Colnago	59h 49' 53"
2	Roberto Visentini (ITA)	Inoxpran	+ 2' 20"
3	Dietrich Thurau (FRG)	Del Tongo–Colnago	+ 2' 34"
4	Silvano Contini (ITA)	Bianchi–Piaggio	+ 3' 08"
5	Lucien Van Impe (BEL)	Metauro Mobili–Pinarello	+ 3' 16"
6	Wladimiro Panizza (ITA)	Atala	+ 3' 36"
7	Tommy Prim (SWE)	Bianchi–Piaggio	+ 4' 00"
8	Alberto Fernández (ESP)	Zor–Gemeaz Cusin	+ 4' 08"
9	Marino Lejarreta (ESP)	Alfa Lum–Olmo	+ 4' 24"
10	Gianbattista Baronchelli (ITA)	Sammontana–Campagnolo	+ 4' 38"

== Stage 14 ==
27 May 1983 — Parma to Savona, 243 km (151 mi)

Stage 14 result

Rank	Rider	Team	Time
1	Gregor Braun (FRG)	Vivi–Benotto	5h 56' 20"
2	Urs Freuler (SUI)	Atala	+ 13"
3	Pierangelo Bincoletto (ITA)	Metauro Mobili–Pinarello	s.t.
4	Frank Hoste (BEL)	Europ Decor–Dries	s.t.
5	Silvano Riccò (ITA)	Termolan	s.t.
6	Frits Pirard (NED)	Metauro Mobili–Pinarello	s.t.
7	Alfredo Chinetti (ITA)	Inoxpran	s.t.
8	Francesco Moser (ITA)	Gis Gelati	s.t.
9	Davide Cassani (ITA)	Termolan	s.t.
10	Patrick Bonnet (FRA)	Wolber–Spidel	s.t.

General classification after Stage 14

Rank	Rider	Team	Time
1	Giuseppe Saronni (ITA)	Del Tongo–Colnago	65h 46' 20"
2	Roberto Visentini (ITA)	Inoxpran	+ 2' 20"
3	Dietrich Thurau (FRG)	Del Tongo–Colnago	+ 2' 34"
4	Silvano Contini (ITA)	Bianchi–Piaggio	+ 3' 08"
5	Lucien Van Impe (BEL)	Metauro Mobili–Pinarello	+ 3' 16"
6	Wladimiro Panizza (ITA)	Atala	+ 3' 36"
7	Tommy Prim (SWE)	Bianchi–Piaggio	+ 4' 00"
8	Alberto Fernández (ESP)	Zor–Gemeaz Cusin	+ 4' 06"
9	Marino Lejarreta (ESP)	Alfa Lum–Olmo	+ 4' 24"
10	Gianbattista Baronchelli (ITA)	Sammontana–Campagnolo	+ 4' 36"

== Stage 15 ==
28 May 1983 — Savona to Orta San Giulio, 219 km (136 mi)

Stage 15 result

Rank	Rider	Team	Time
1	Paolo Rosola (ITA)	Atala	6h 07' 03"
2	Gerhard Zadrobilek (AUT)	Eorotex–Magniflex	s.t.
3	Silvano Contini (ITA)	Bianchi–Piaggio	s.t.
4	Silvano Riccò (ITA)	Termolan	s.t.
5	Frank Hoste (BEL)	Europ Decor–Dries	s.t.
6	Pierino Gavazzi (ITA)	Atala	s.t.
7	Frits Pirard (NED)	Metauro Mobili–Pinarello	s.t.
8	Stefan Mutter (SUI)	Eorotex–Magniflex	s.t.
9	Vittorio Algeri (ITA)	Metauro Mobili–Pinarello	s.t.
10	Francesco Moser (ITA)	Gis Gelati	s.t.

General classification after Stage 15

Rank	Rider	Team	Time
1	Giuseppe Saronni (ITA)	Del Tongo–Colnago	71h 53' 29"
2	Roberto Visentini (ITA)	Inoxpran	+ 2' 20"
3	Dietrich Thurau (FRG)	Del Tongo–Colnago	+ 2' 34"
4	Silvano Contini (ITA)	Bianchi–Piaggio	+ 2' 58"
5	Lucien Van Impe (BEL)	Metauro Mobili–Pinarello	+ 3' 16"
6	Wladimiro Panizza (ITA)	Atala	+ 3' 30"
7	Tommy Prim (SWE)	Bianchi–Piaggio	+ 4' 00"
8	Alberto Fernández (ESP)	Zor–Gemeaz Cusin	+ 4' 08"
9	Marino Lejarreta (ESP)	Alfa Lum–Olmo	+ 4' 24"
10	Gianbattista Baronchelli (ITA)	Sammontana–Campagnolo	+ 4' 38"

== Stage 16a ==
29 May 1983 — Orta San Giulio to Milan, 110 km (68 mi)

Stage 16a result

Rank	Rider	Team	Time
1	Frank Hoste (BEL)	Europ Decor–Dries	2h 34' 26"
2	Pierino Gavazzi (ITA)	Atala	s.t.
3	Stefan Mutter (SUI)	Eorotex–Magniflex	s.t.
4	Claudio Girlanda (ITA)	Termolan	s.t.
5	Emanuele Bombini (ITA)	Malvor–Bottecchia	s.t.
6	Moreno Argentin (ITA)	Sammontana–Campagnolo	s.t.
7	Peter Kehl (FRG)	Dromedario–Alan–Sidermec	s.t.
8	Paolo Rosola (ITA)	Atala	s.t.
9	Frits Pirard (NED)	Metauro Mobili–Pinarello	s.t.
10	Marc Van Den Brande (BEL)	Hoonved–Almoda–Perlav	s.t.

General classification after Stage 16a

Rank	Rider	Team	Time
1	Giuseppe Saronni (ITA)	Del Tongo–Colnago	

== Stage 16b ==
29 May 1983 — Milan to Bergamo, 100 km (62 mi)

Stage 16b result

Rank	Rider	Team	Time
1	Giuseppe Saronni (ITA)	Del Tongo–Colnago	2h 16' 49"
2	Moreno Argentin (ITA)	Sammontana–Campagnolo	s.t.
3	Eddy Schepers (BEL)	Hoonved–Almoda–Perlav	s.t.
4	Tommy Prim (SWE)	Bianchi–Piaggio	s.t.
5	Stefan Mutter (SUI)	Eorotex–Magniflex	s.t.
6	Emanuele Bombini (ITA)	Malvor–Bottecchia	s.t.
7	Frits Pirard (NED)	Metauro Mobili–Pinarello	s.t.
8	Jean-René Bernaudeau (FRA)	Wolber–Spidel	s.t.
9	Alessandro Paganessi (ITA)	Bianchi–Piaggio	s.t.
10	Harald Maier (AUT)	Eorotex–Magniflex	s.t.

General classification after Stage 16b

Rank	Rider	Team	Time
1	Giuseppe Saronni (ITA)	Del Tongo–Colnago	76h 44' 14"
2	Roberto Visentini (ITA)	Inoxpran	+ 2' 50"
3	Dietrich Thurau (FRG)	Del Tongo–Colnago	+ 3' 04"
4	Silvano Contini (ITA)	Bianchi–Piaggio	+ 3' 28"
5	Lucien Van Impe (BEL)	Metauro Mobili–Pinarello	+ 3' 46"
6	Wladimiro Panizza (ITA)	Atala	+ 4' 06"
7	Tommy Prim (SWE)	Bianchi–Piaggio	+ 4' 25"
8	Alberto Fernández (ESP)	Zor–Gemeaz Cusin	+ 4' 38"
9	Marino Lejarreta (ESP)	Alfa Lum–Olmo	+ 4' 54"
10	Gianbattista Baronchelli (ITA)	Sammontana–Campagnolo	+ 5' 08"

== Stage 17 ==
30 May 1983 — Bergamo to Colli di San Fermo, 91 km (57 mi)

Stage 17 result

Rank	Rider	Team	Time
1	Alberto Fernández (ESP)	Zor–Gemeaz Cusin	2h 12' 19"
2	Lucien Van Impe (BEL)	Metauro Mobili–Pinarello	+ 17"
3	Roberto Visentini (ITA)	Inoxpran	+ 19"
4	Mario Beccia (ITA)	Malvor–Bottecchia	+ 25"
5	Pedro Muñoz (ESP)	Zor–Gemeaz Cusin	+ 30"
6	Faustino Rupérez (ESP)	Zor–Gemeaz Cusin	+ 34"
7	Giuseppe Saronni (ITA)	Del Tongo–Colnago	s.t.
8	Alessandro Paganessi (ITA)	Bianchi–Piaggio	+ 1' 13"
9	Silvano Contini (ITA)	Bianchi–Piaggio	+ 1' 18"
10	Miro Poloncic (YUG)	Malvor–Bottecchia	+ 1' 29"

General classification after Stage 17

Rank	Rider	Team	Time
1	Giuseppe Saronni (ITA)	Del Tongo–Colnago	78h 57' 07"
2	Roberto Visentini (ITA)	Inoxpran	+ 2' 25"
3	Lucien Van Impe (BEL)	Metauro Mobili–Pinarello	+ 3' 09"
4	Alberto Fernández (ESP)	Zor–Gemeaz Cusin	+ 3' 34"
5	Silvano Contini (ITA)	Bianchi–Piaggio	+ 4' 10"
6	Dietrich Thurau (FRG)	Del Tongo–Colnago	+ 5' 04"
7	Tommy Prim (SWE)	Bianchi–Piaggio	+ 5' 55"
8	Mario Beccia (ITA)	Malvor–Bottecchia	+ 6' 02"
9	Gianbattista Baronchelli (ITA)	Sammontana–Campagnolo	+ 6' 13"
10	Marino Lejarreta (ESP)	Alfa Lum–Olmo	+ 6' 17"

== Stage 18 ==
31 May 1983 — Sarnico to Vicenza, 178 km (111 mi)

Stage 18 result

Rank	Rider	Team	Time
1	Paolo Rosola (ITA)	Atala	4h 32' 54"
2	Pierangelo Bincoletto (ITA)	Metauro Mobili–Pinarello	+ 1"
3	Silvano Riccò (ITA)	Termolan	s.t.
4	Frank Hoste (BEL)	Europ Decor–Dries	s.t.
5	Giuliano Pavanello (ITA)	Mareno–Wilier Triestina	s.t.
6	Pierino Gavazzi (ITA)	Atala	s.t.
7	Stefan Mutter (SUI)	Eorotex–Magniflex	s.t.
8	Luigi Trevellin (ITA)	Dromedario–Alan–Sidermec	s.t.
9	Frits Pirard (NED)	Metauro Mobili–Pinarello	s.t.
10	Marc Van Den Brande (BEL)	Hoonved–Almoda–Perlav	s.t.

General classification after Stage 18

Rank	Rider	Team	Time
1	Giuseppe Saronni (ITA)	Del Tongo–Colnago	83h 30' 02"
2	Roberto Visentini (ITA)	Inoxpran	+ 2' 25"
3	Lucien Van Impe (BEL)	Metauro Mobili–Pinarello	+ 3' 09"
4	Alberto Fernández (ESP)	Zor–Gemeaz Cusin	+ 3' 34"
5	Silvano Contini (ITA)	Bianchi–Piaggio	+ 4' 10"
6	Dietrich Thurau (FRG)	Del Tongo–Colnago	+ 5' 04"
7	Tommy Prim (SWE)	Bianchi–Piaggio	+ 5' 55"
8	Mario Beccia (ITA)	Malvor–Bottecchia	+ 6' 02"
9	Gianbattista Baronchelli (ITA)	Sammontana–Campagnolo	+ 6' 13"
10	Marino Lejarreta (ESP)	Alfa Lum–Olmo	+ 6' 17"

== Rest day 2 ==
1 June 1983

== Stage 19 ==
2 June 1983 — Vicenza to Selva di Val Gardena, 224 km (139 mi)

Stage 19 result

Rank	Rider	Team	Time
1	Mario Beccia (ITA)	Malvor–Bottecchia	5h 57' 07"
2	Marino Lejarreta (ESP)	Alfa Lum–Olmo	s.t.
3	Emanuele Bombini (ITA)	Malvor–Bottecchia	+ 17"
4	Eduardo Chozas (ESP)	Zor–Gemeaz Cusin	s.t.
5	Eddy Schepers (BEL)	Hoonved–Almoda–Perlav	s.t.
6	Juan Fernández (ESP)	Zor–Gemeaz Cusin	s.t.
7	Jean-René Bernaudeau (FRA)	Wolber–Spidel	s.t.
8	Giuseppe Saronni (ITA)	Del Tongo–Colnago	s.t.
9	Wladimiro Panizza (ITA)	Atala	s.t.
10	Roberto Visentini (ITA)	Inoxpran	s.t.

General classification after Stage 19

Rank	Rider	Team	Time
1	Giuseppe Saronni (ITA)	Del Tongo–Colnago	89h 27' 28"
2	Roberto Visentini (ITA)	Inoxpran	+ 2' 25"
3	Alberto Fernández (ESP)	Zor–Gemeaz Cusin	+ 3' 34"
4	Lucien Van Impe (BEL)	Metauro Mobili–Pinarello	+ 5' 03"
5	Mario Beccia (ITA)	Malvor–Bottecchia	+ 5' 13"
6	Marino Lejarreta (ESP)	Alfa Lum–Olmo	+ 5' 38"
7	Wladimiro Panizza (ITA)	Atala	+ 6' 21"
8	Dietrich Thurau (FRG)	Del Tongo–Colnago	+ 6' 53"
9	Eduardo Chozas (ESP)	Zor–Gemeaz Cusin	+ 7' 28"
10	Faustino Rupérez (ESP)	Zor–Gemeaz Cusin	+ 7' 52"

== Stage 20 ==
3 June 1983 — Selva di Val Gardena to Arabba, 169 km (105 mi)

Stage 20 result

Rank	Rider	Team	Time
1	Alessandro Paganessi (ITA)	Bianchi–Piaggio	4h 29' 52"
2	Mario Beccia (ITA)	Malvor–Bottecchia	+ 2' 03"
3	Jean-René Bernaudeau (FRA)	Wolber–Spidel	+ 2' 05"
4	Juan Fernández (ESP)	Zor–Gemeaz Cusin	+ 2' 16"
5	Faustino Rupérez (ESP)	Zor–Gemeaz Cusin	s.t.
6	Roberto Visentini (ITA)	Inoxpran	+ 2' 26"
7	Eduardo Chozas (ESP)	Zor–Gemeaz Cusin	s.t.
8	Luciano Loro (ITA)	Inoxpran	s.t.
9	Marino Lejarreta (ESP)	Alfa Lum–Olmo	s.t.
10	Pedro Muñoz (ESP)	Zor–Gemeaz Cusin	s.t.

General classification after Stage 20

Rank	Rider	Team	Time
1	Giuseppe Saronni (ITA)	Del Tongo–Colnago	94h 00' 15"
2	Roberto Visentini (ITA)	Inoxpran	+ 1' 56"
3	Alberto Fernández (ESP)	Zor–Gemeaz Cusin	+ 2' 50"
4	Mario Beccia (ITA)	Malvor–Bottecchia	+ 4' 01"
5	Marino Lejarreta (ESP)	Alfa Lum–Olmo	+ 5' 09"
6	Eduardo Chozas (ESP)	Zor–Gemeaz Cusin	+ 6' 59"
7	Dietrich Thurau (FRG)	Del Tongo–Colnago	+ 7' 10"
8	Faustino Rupérez (ESP)	Zor–Gemeaz Cusin	+ 7' 13"
9	Lucien Van Impe (BEL)	Metauro Mobili–Pinarello	+ 8' 16"
10	Pedro Muñoz (ESP)	Zor–Gemeaz Cusin	+ 8' 58"

== Stage 21 ==
4 June 1983 — Arabba to Gorizia, 232 km (144 mi)

Stage 21 result

Rank	Rider	Team	Time
1	Moreno Argentin (ITA)	Sammontana–Campagnolo	5h 54' 41"
2	Frank Hoste (BEL)	Europ Decor–Dries	+ 2"
3	Pierino Gavazzi (ITA)	Atala	s.t.
4	Urs Freuler (SUI)	Atala	s.t.
5	Dante Morandi (ITA)	Gis Gelati	s.t.
6	Acácio da Silva (POR)	Eorotex–Magniflex	s.t.
7	Jorg Bruggmann (SUI)	Malvor–Bottecchia	s.t.
8	Nazzareno Berto (ITA)	Mareno–Wilier Triestina	s.t.
9	Pierangelo Bincoletto (ITA)	Metauro Mobili–Pinarello	s.t.
10	Frits Pirard (NED)	Metauro Mobili–Pinarello	s.t.

General classification after Stage 21

Rank	Rider	Team	Time
1	Giuseppe Saronni (ITA)	Del Tongo–Colnago	99h 54' 58"
2	Roberto Visentini (ITA)	Inoxpran	+ 1' 56"
3	Alberto Fernández (ESP)	Zor–Gemeaz Cusin	+ 2' 59"
4	Mario Beccia (ITA)	Malvor–Bottecchia	+ 4' 01"
5	Marino Lejarreta (ESP)	Alfa Lum–Olmo	+ 5' 09"
6	Eduardo Chozas (ESP)	Zor–Gemeaz Cusin	+ 6' 59"
7	Dietrich Thurau (FRG)	Del Tongo–Colnago	+ 7' 10"
8	Faustino Rupérez (ESP)	Zor–Gemeaz Cusin	+ 7' 13"
9	Lucien Van Impe (BEL)	Metauro Mobili–Pinarello	+ 8' 16"
10	Pedro Muñoz (ESP)	Zor–Gemeaz Cusin	+ 8' 58"

== Stage 22 ==
5 June 1983 — Gorizia to Udine, 40 km (25 mi) (ITT)

Stage 22 result

Rank	Rider	Team	Time
1	Roberto Visentini (ITA)	Inoxpran	49' 43"
2	Daniel Gisiger (SUI)	Malvor–Bottecchia	+ 32"
3	Giuseppe Saronni (ITA)	Del Tongo–Colnago	+ 49"
4	Urs Freuler (SUI)	Atala	+ 1' 00"
5	Marc Somers (BEL)	Europ Decor–Dries	+ 1' 05"
6	Dietrich Thurau (FRG)	Del Tongo–Colnago	+ 1' 23"
7	Frits Pirard (NED)	Metauro Mobili–Pinarello	+ 1' 38"
8	Juan Fernández (ESP)	Zor–Gemeaz Cusin	+ 1' 39"
9	Czesław Lang (POL)	Gis Gelati	+ 1' 40"
10	Gregor Braun (FRG)	Vivi–Benotto	+ 2' 00"

General classification after Stage 22

Rank	Rider	Team	Time
1	Giuseppe Saronni (ITA)	Del Tongo–Colnago	100h 45' 30"
2	Roberto Visentini (ITA)	Inoxpran	+ 1' 07"
3	Alberto Fernández (ESP)	Zor–Gemeaz Cusin	+ 3' 40"
4	Mario Beccia (ITA)	Malvor–Bottecchia	+ 5' 55"
5	Dietrich Thurau (FRG)	Del Tongo–Colnago	+ 7' 44"
6	Marino Lejarreta (ESP)	Alfa Lum–Olmo	+ 7' 47"
7	Faustino Rupérez (ESP)	Zor–Gemeaz Cusin	+ 8' 24"
8	Eduardo Chozas (ESP)	Zor–Gemeaz Cusin	+ 9' 41"
9	Lucien Van Impe (BEL)	Metauro Mobili–Pinarello	+ 10' 54"
10	Wladimiro Panizza (ITA)	Atala	+ 12' 00"
