= 1984 Giro d'Italia, Prologue to Stage 11 =

Cycling race stages

The 1984 Giro d'Italia was the 67th edition of the Giro d'Italia, one of cycling's Grand Tours. The Giro began in Lucca, with a prologue individual time trial on 17 May, and Stage 11 occurred on 28 May with a stage to Rieti. The race finished in Verona on 10 June. The race won by Urs Freuler before Roger De Vlaeminck and Johan van der Velde. Francesco Moser was leading the general classification.

== Prologue ==
17 May 1984 — Lucca, 5 km (3.1 mi) (ITT)

Prologue result

Rank	Rider	Team	Time
1	Francesco Moser (ITA)	Gis Gelati–Tuc Lu	6' 14"
2	Silvestro Milani (ITA)	Malvor–Bottecchia	+ 11"
3	Roberto Visentini (ITA)	Carrera–Inoxpran	+ 12"
4	Silvano Contini (ITA)	Bianchi–Piaggio	+ 13"
5	Daniel Wyder (SUI)	Cilo–Aufina–Magniflex	+ 14"
6	Moreno Argentin (ITA)	Sammontana	s.t.
7	Emanuele Bombini (ITA)	Del Tongo–Colnago	+ 15"
8	Laurent Fignon (FRA)	Renault–Elf	+ 17"
9	Giuseppe Saronni (ITA)	Del Tongo–Colnago	s.t.
10	Urs Freuler (SUI)	Atala	+ 19"

== Stage 1 ==
18 May 1984 — Lucca to Marina di Pietrasanta, 55 km (34 mi) (TTT)

Stage 1 result

Rank	Team	Time
1	Renault–Elf	1h 04' 13"
2	Carrera–Inoxpran	+ 6"
3	Gis Gelati–Tuc Lu	+ 27"
4	Metauro Mobili–Pinarello	s.t.
5	Atala	+ 30"
6	Alfa Lum–Olmo	+ 44"
7	Sammontana	+ 47"
8	Cilo–Aufina–Magniflex	+ 49"
9	Supermercati Brianzoli	+ 1' 22"
10	Malvor–Bottecchia	+ 1' 24"

General classification after Stage 1

Rank	Rider	Team	Time
1	Laurent Fignon (FRA)	Renault–Elf	1h 08' 13"
2	Francesco Moser (ITA)	Gis Gelati–Tuc Lu	+ 4"
3	Dominique Gaigne (FRA)	Renault–Elf	+ 5"
4	Roberto Visentini (ITA)	Carrera–Inoxpran	+ 6"
5	Charly Mottet (FRA)	Renault–Elf	+ 7"
6	Bruno Wojtinek (FRA)	Renault–Elf	+ 9"
7	Philippe Chevallier (FRA)	Renault–Elf	s.t.
8	Guido Bontempi (ITA)	Carrera–Inoxpran	+ 13"
9	Pierre-Henri Menthéour (FRA)	Renault–Elf	+ 18"
10	Bruno Leali (ITA)	Carrera–Inoxpran	+ 20"

== Stage 2 ==
19 May 1984 — Marina di Pietrasanta to Florence, 127 km (79 mi)

Stage 2 result

Rank	Rider	Team	Time
1	Urs Freuler (SUI)	Atala	3h 15' 02"
2	Pierino Gavazzi (ITA)	Atala	s.t.
3	Silvestro Milani (ITA)	Malvor–Bottecchia	s.t.
4	Bruno Wojtinek (FRA)	Renault–Elf	s.t.
5	Roger De Vlaeminck (BEL)	Gis Gelati–Tuc Lu	+ 7"
6	Guido Van Calster (BEL)	Del Tongo–Colnago	s.t.
7	Johan van der Velde (NED)	Metauro Mobili–Pinarello	+ 8"
8	Alfredo Chinetti (ITA)	Supermercati Brianzoli	s.t.
9	Filippo Piersanti (ITA)	Murella	s.t.
10	Gilbert Glaus (SUI)	Cilo–Aufina–Magniflex	s.t.

General classification after Stage 2

Rank	Rider	Team	Time
1	Laurent Fignon (FRA)	Renault–Elf	4h 23' 15"
2	Bruno Wojtinek (FRA)	Renault–Elf	+ 4"
3	Francesco Moser (ITA)	Gis Gelati–Tuc Lu	s.t.
4	Dominique Gaigne (FRA)	Renault–Elf	+ 5"
5	Roberto Visentini (ITA)	Carrera–Inoxpran	+ 6"
6	Charly Mottet (FRA)	Renault–Elf	+ 7"
7	Philippe Chevallier (FRA)	Renault–Elf	+ 9"
8	Guido Bontempi (ITA)	Carrera–Inoxpran	+ 13"
9	Pierre-Henri Menthéour (FRA)	Renault–Elf	+ 18"
10	Bruno Leali (ITA)	Carrera–Inoxpran	+ 20"

== Stage 3 ==
20 May 1984 — Bologna to Madonna di San Luca, 110 km (68 mi)

Stage 3 result

Rank	Rider	Team	Time
1	Moreno Argentin (ITA)	Sammontana	2h 39' 51"
2	Laurent Fignon (FRA)	Renault–Elf	+ 2"
3	Jesús Rodríguez (ESP)	Zor–Gemeaz Cusin	+ 3"
4	Johan van der Velde (NED)	Metauro Mobili–Pinarello	s.t.
5	Marino Lejarreta (ESP)	Alfa Lum–Olmo	+ 5"
6	Hubert Seiz (SUI)	Cilo–Aufina–Magniflex	s.t.
7	Gianbattista Baronchelli (ITA)	Murella	s.t.
8	Beat Breu (SUI)	Cilo–Aufina–Magniflex	+ 8"
9	Alessandro Paganessi (ITA)	Sammontana	+ 9"
10	Lucien Van Impe (BEL)	Metauro Mobili–Pinarello	+ 10"

General classification after Stage 3

Rank	Rider	Team	Time
1	Laurent Fignon (FRA)	Renault–Elf	7h 02' 53"
2	Roberto Visentini (ITA)	Carrera–Inoxpran	+ 31"
3	Francesco Moser (ITA)	Gis Gelati–Tuc Lu	+ 35"
4	Charly Mottet (FRA)	Renault–Elf	+ 38"
5	Johan van der Velde (NED)	Metauro Mobili–Pinarello	+ 51"
6	Moreno Argentin (ITA)	Sammontana	s.t.
7	Martial Gayant (FRA)	Renault–Elf	+ 54"
8	Giovanni Battaglin (ITA)	Carrera–Inoxpran	+ 59"
9	Bruno Wojtinek (FRA)	Renault–Elf	+ 1' 00"
10	Lucien Van Impe (BEL)	Metauro Mobili–Pinarello	+ 1' 09"

== Stage 4 ==
21 May 1984 — Bologna to Numana, 238 km (148 mi)

Stage 4 result

Rank	Rider	Team	Time
1	Stefan Mutter (SUI)	Cilo–Aufina–Magniflex	6h 04' 33"
2	Urs Freuler (SUI)	Atala	s.t.
3	Giovanni Mantovani (ITA)	Malvor–Bottecchia	s.t.
4	Guido Van Calster (BEL)	Del Tongo–Colnago	s.t.
5	Dag Erik Pedersen (NOR)	Murella	s.t.
6	Paolo Rosola (ITA)	Bianchi–Piaggio	s.t.
7	Jürg Bruggmann (SUI)	Malvor–Bottecchia	s.t.
8	Johan van der Velde (NED)	Metauro Mobili–Pinarello	s.t.
9	Nazzareno Berto (ITA)	Fanini–Wührer	s.t.
10	Guido Bontempi (ITA)	Carrera–Inoxpran	s.t.

General classification after Stage 4

Rank	Rider	Team	Time
1	Laurent Fignon (FRA)	Renault–Elf	13h 07' 26"
2	Roberto Visentini (ITA)	Carrera–Inoxpran	+ 31"
3	Francesco Moser (ITA)	Gis Gelati–Tuc Lu	+ 35"
4	Charly Mottet (FRA)	Renault–Elf	+ 38"
5	Johan van der Velde (NED)	Metauro Mobili–Pinarello	+ 51"
6	Moreno Argentin (ITA)	Sammontana	s.t.
7	Martial Gayant (FRA)	Renault–Elf	+ 54"
8	Giovanni Battaglin (ITA)	Carrera–Inoxpran	+ 59"
9	Lucien Van Impe (BEL)	Metauro Mobili–Pinarello	+ 1' 09"
10	Philippe Chevallier (FRA)	Renault–Elf	+ 1' 12"

== Stage 5 ==
22 May 1984 — Numana to Blockhaus, 194 km (121 mi)

Stage 5 result

Rank	Rider	Team	Time
1	Moreno Argentin (ITA)	Sammontana	5h 40' 11"
2	Francesco Moser (ITA)	Gis Gelati–Tuc Lu	+ 2"
3	Acácio da Silva (POR)	Malvor–Bottecchia	+ 3"
4	Marino Lejarreta (ESP)	Alfa Lum–Olmo	+ 6"
5	Jesús Rodríguez (ESP)	Zor–Gemeaz Cusin	+ 10"
6	Beat Breu (SUI)	Cilo–Aufina–Magniflex	s.t.
7	Roberto Visentini (ITA)	Carrera–Inoxpran	s.t.
8	Mario Beccia (ITA)	Malvor–Bottecchia	s.t.
9	Silvano Contini (ITA)	Bianchi–Piaggio	+ 24"
10	Vinko Polončič (YUG)	Malvor–Bottecchia	+ 39"

General classification after Stage 5

Rank	Rider	Team	Time
1	Francesco Moser (ITA)	Gis Gelati–Tuc Lu	19h 47' 59"
2	Moreno Argentin (ITA)	Sammontana	+ 9"
3	Roberto Visentini (ITA)	Carrera–Inoxpran	+ 19"
4	Laurent Fignon (FRA)	Renault–Elf	+ 43"
5	Marino Lejarreta (ESP)	Alfa Lum–Olmo	+ 55"
6	Beat Breu (SUI)	Cilo–Aufina–Magniflex	+ 1' 29"
7	Johan van der Velde (NED)	Metauro Mobili–Pinarello	+ 1' 34"
8	Acácio da Silva (POR)	Malvor–Bottecchia	+ 1' 36"
9	Mario Beccia (ITA)	Malvor–Bottecchia	+ 1' 46"
10	Giovanni Battaglin (ITA)	Carrera–Inoxpran	+ 1' 48"

== Stage 6 ==
23 May 1984 — Chieti to Foggia, 193 km (120 mi)

Stage 6 result

Rank	Rider	Team	Time
1	Francesco Moser (ITA)	Gis Gelati–Tuc Lu	5h 28' 08"
2	Gilbert Glaus (SUI)	Cilo–Aufina–Magniflex	s.t.
3	Pierangelo Bincoletto (ITA)	Metauro Mobili–Pinarello	s.t.
4	Giuliano Pavanello (ITA)	Supermercati Brianzoli	s.t.
5	Laurent Fignon (FRA)	Renault–Elf	s.t.
6	Moreno Argentin (ITA)	Sammontana	s.t.
7	Acácio da Silva (POR)	Malvor–Bottecchia	s.t.
8	Paolo Rosola (ITA)	Bianchi–Piaggio	s.t.
9	Urs Freuler (SUI)	Atala	s.t.
10	Johan van der Velde (NED)	Metauro Mobili–Pinarello	s.t.

General classification after Stage 6

Rank	Rider	Team	Time
1	Francesco Moser (ITA)	Gis Gelati–Tuc Lu	24h 15' 47"
2	Moreno Argentin (ITA)	Sammontana	+ 29"
3	Roberto Visentini (ITA)	Carrera–Inoxpran	+ 39"
4	Laurent Fignon (FRA)	Renault–Elf	+ 1' 03"
5	Marino Lejarreta (ESP)	Alfa Lum–Olmo	+ 1' 15"
6	Beat Breu (SUI)	Cilo–Aufina–Magniflex	+ 1' 49"
7	Johan van der Velde (NED)	Metauro Mobili–Pinarello	+ 1' 54"
8	Acácio da Silva (POR)	Malvor–Bottecchia	+ 1' 56"
9	Mario Beccia (ITA)	Malvor–Bottecchia	+ 2' 06"
10	Giovanni Battaglin (ITA)	Carrera–Inoxpran	+ 2' 08"

== Stage 7 ==
24 May 1984 — Foggia to Marconia di Pisticci, 226 km (140 mi)

Stage 7 result

Rank	Rider	Team	Time
1	Urs Freuler (SUI)	Atala	5h 56' 33"
2	Giovanni Mantovani (ITA)	Malvor–Bottecchia	s.t.
3	Nazzareno Berto (ITA)	Fanini–Wührer	s.t.
4	Bruno Wojtinek (FRA)	Renault–Elf	s.t.
5	Dante Morandi (ITA)	Atala	s.t.
6	Roger De Vlaeminck (BEL)	Gis Gelati–Tuc Lu	s.t.
7	Gottfried Schmutz (SUI)	Dromedario	s.t.
8	Dario Mariuzzi (ITA)	Sammontana	s.t.
9	Pierino Gavazzi (ITA)	Atala	s.t.
10	Sten Petersen (DEN)	Fanini–Wührer	s.t.

General classification after Stage 7

Rank	Rider	Team	Time
1	Francesco Moser (ITA)	Gis Gelati–Tuc Lu	30h 12' 20"
2	Moreno Argentin (ITA)	Sammontana	+ 29"
3	Roberto Visentini (ITA)	Carrera–Inoxpran	+ 39"
4	Laurent Fignon (FRA)	Renault–Elf	+ 1' 03"
5	Marino Lejarreta (ESP)	Alfa Lum–Olmo	+ 1' 15"
6	Beat Breu (SUI)	Cilo–Aufina–Magniflex	+ 1' 49"
7	Johan van der Velde (NED)	Metauro Mobili–Pinarello	+ 1' 54"
8	Acácio da Silva (POR)	Malvor–Bottecchia	+ 1' 56"
9	Mario Beccia (ITA)	Malvor–Bottecchia	+ 2' 06"
10	Giovanni Battaglin (ITA)	Carrera–Inoxpran	+ 2' 08"

== Stage 8 ==
25 May 1984 — Policoro to Agropoli, 228 km (142 mi)

Stage 8 result

Rank	Rider	Team	Time
1	Urs Freuler (SUI)	Atala	5h 57' 38"
2	Paolo Rosola (ITA)	Bianchi–Piaggio	s.t.
3	Francesco Moser (ITA)	Gis Gelati–Tuc Lu	s.t.
4	Stefan Mutter (SUI)	Cilo–Aufina–Magniflex	s.t.
5	Johan van der Velde (NED)	Metauro Mobili–Pinarello	s.t.
6	Pierino Gavazzi (ITA)	Atala	s.t.
7	Frits Pirard (NED)	Metauro Mobili–Pinarello	s.t.
8	Mauro Longo (ITA)	Supermercati Brianzoli	s.t.
9	Giuseppe Martinelli (ITA)	Alfa Lum–Olmo	s.t.
10	Guido Bontempi (ITA)	Carrera–Inoxpran	s.t.

General classification after Stage 8

Rank	Rider	Team	Time
1	Francesco Moser (ITA)	Gis Gelati–Tuc Lu	36h 09' 48"
2	Moreno Argentin (ITA)	Sammontana	+ 39"
3	Roberto Visentini (ITA)	Carrera–Inoxpran	+ 49"
4	Laurent Fignon (FRA)	Renault–Elf	+ 1' 13"
5	Marino Lejarreta (ESP)	Alfa Lum–Olmo	+ 1' 25"
6	Beat Breu (SUI)	Cilo–Aufina–Magniflex	+ 1' 59"
7	Johan van der Velde (NED)	Metauro Mobili–Pinarello	+ 2' 04"
8	Acácio da Silva (POR)	Malvor–Bottecchia	+ 2' 06"
9	Mario Beccia (ITA)	Malvor–Bottecchia	+ 2' 13"
10	Giovanni Battaglin (ITA)	Carrera–Inoxpran	+ 2' 18"

== Stage 9 ==
26 May 1984 — Agropoli to Cava de' Tirreni, 104 km (65 mi)

Stage 9 result

Rank	Rider	Team	Time
1	Dag Erik Pedersen (NOR)	Murella	2h 23' 25"
2	Laurent Fignon (FRA)	Renault–Elf	s.t.
3	Giovanni Battaglin (ITA)	Carrera–Inoxpran	s.t.
4	Eddy Schepers (BEL)	Dromedario	s.t.
5	Wladimiro Panizza (ITA)	Atala	s.t.
6	Hubert Seiz (SUI)	Cilo–Aufina–Magniflex	s.t.
7	Faustino Rupérez (ESP)	Zor–Gemeaz Cusin	s.t.
8	Moreno Argentin (ITA)	Sammontana	+ 4"
9	Marino Amadori (ITA)	Alfa Lum–Olmo	s.t.
10	Johan van der Velde (NED)	Metauro Mobili–Pinarello	s.t.

General classification after Stage 9

Rank	Rider	Team	Time
1	Francesco Moser (ITA)	Gis Gelati–Tuc Lu	38h 33' 17"
2	Moreno Argentin (ITA)	Sammontana	+ 39"
3	Roberto Visentini (ITA)	Carrera–Inoxpran	+ 49"
4	Laurent Fignon (FRA)	Renault–Elf	+ 54"
5	Marino Lejarreta (ESP)	Alfa Lum–Olmo	+ 1' 25"
6	Johan van der Velde (NED)	Metauro Mobili–Pinarello	+ 2' 04"
7	Giovanni Battaglin (ITA)	Carrera–Inoxpran	s.t.
8	Acácio da Silva (POR)	Malvor–Bottecchia	+ 2' 06"
9	Beat Breu (SUI)	Cilo–Aufina–Magniflex	+ 2' 10"
10	Mario Beccia (ITA)	Malvor–Bottecchia	+ 2' 16"

== Rest day 1 ==
27 May 1984

== Stage 10 ==
28 May 1984 — Cava de' Tirreni to Isernia, 209 km (130 mi)

Stage 10 result

Rank	Rider	Team	Time
1	Martial Gayant (FRA)	Renault–Elf	5h 40' 57"
2	Charly Mottet (FRA)	Renault–Elf	+ 19"
3	Giuseppe Saronni (ITA)	Del Tongo–Colnago	s.t.
4	Roger De Vlaeminck (BEL)	Gis Gelati–Tuc Lu	s.t.
5	Moreno Argentin (ITA)	Sammontana	+ 23"
6	Laurent Fignon (FRA)	Renault–Elf	s.t.
7	Dag Erik Pedersen (NOR)	Murella	s.t.
8	Guido Van Calster (BEL)	Del Tongo–Colnago	s.t.
9	Johan van der Velde (NED)	Metauro Mobili–Pinarello	s.t.
10	Giuliano Pavanello (ITA)	Supermercati Brianzoli	s.t.

General classification after Stage 10

Rank	Rider	Team	Time
1	Francesco Moser (ITA)	Gis Gelati–Tuc Lu	44h 14' 37"
2	Moreno Argentin (ITA)	Sammontana	+ 39"
3	Roberto Visentini (ITA)	Carrera–Inoxpran	+ 49"
4	Laurent Fignon (FRA)	Renault–Elf	+ 54"
5	Marino Lejarreta (ESP)	Alfa Lum–Olmo	+ 1' 35"
6	Johan van der Velde (NED)	Metauro Mobili–Pinarello	+ 2' 07"
7	Acácio da Silva (POR)	Malvor–Bottecchia	+ 2' 08"
8	Beat Breu (SUI)	Cilo–Aufina–Magniflex	+ 2' 10"
9	Giovanni Battaglin (ITA)	Carrera–Inoxpran	+ 2' 14"
10	Mario Beccia (ITA)	Malvor–Bottecchia	+ 2' 16"

== Stage 11 ==
29 May 1984 — Isernia to Rieti, 243 km (151 mi)

Stage 11 result

Rank	Rider	Team	Time
1	Urs Freuler (SUI)	Atala	6h 27' 55"
2	Roger De Vlaeminck (BEL)	Gis Gelati–Tuc Lu	s.t.
3	Johan van der Velde (NED)	Metauro Mobili–Pinarello	s.t.
4	Pierino Gavazzi (ITA)	Atala	s.t.
5	Paolo Rosola (ITA)	Bianchi–Piaggio	s.t.
6	Guido Van Calster (BEL)	Del Tongo–Colnago	s.t.
7	Pierangelo Bincoletto (ITA)	Metauro Mobili–Pinarello	s.t.
8	Mauro Longo (ITA)	Supermercati Brianzoli	s.t.
9	Bruno Wojtinek (FRA)	Renault–Elf	s.t.
10	Giuseppe Martinelli (ITA)	Alfa Lum–Olmo	s.t.

General classification after Stage 11

Rank	Rider	Team	Time
1	Francesco Moser (ITA)	Gis Gelati–Tuc Lu	50h 42' 32"
2	Moreno Argentin (ITA)	Sammontana	+ 39"
3	Roberto Visentini (ITA)	Carrera–Inoxpran	+ 49"
4	Laurent Fignon (FRA)	Renault–Elf	+ 54"
5	Marino Lejarreta (ESP)	Alfa Lum–Olmo	+ 1' 35"
6	Johan van der Velde (NED)	Metauro Mobili–Pinarello	+ 1' 54"
7	Acácio da Silva (POR)	Malvor–Bottecchia	+ 2' 06"
8	Beat Breu (SUI)	Cilo–Aufina–Magniflex	+ 2' 10"
9	Giovanni Battaglin (ITA)	Carrera–Inoxpran	+ 2' 14"
10	Mario Beccia (ITA)	Malvor–Bottecchia	+ 2' 16"
