= 1984 Giro d'Italia, Stage 12 to Stage 22 =

Cycling race stages

The 1984 Giro d'Italia was the 67th edition of the Giro d'Italia, one of cycling's Grand Tours. The Giro began in Lucca, with a prologue individual time trial on 17 May, and Stage 12 occurred on 30 May with a stage from Rieti. The race finished in Verona on 10 June.

== Stage 12 ==
30 May 1984 — Rieti to Città di Castello, 175 km (109 mi)

Stage 12 result

Rank	Rider	Team	Time
1	Paolo Rosola (ITA)	Bianchi–Piaggio	4h 07' 00"
2	Roger De Vlaeminck (BEL)	Gis Gelati–Tuc Lu	s.t.
3	Silvano Riccò (ITA)	Santini	s.t.
4	Urs Freuler (SUI)	Atala	s.t.
5	Pierino Gavazzi (ITA)	Atala	s.t.
6	Dag Erik Pedersen (NOR)	Murella	s.t.
7	Stefan Mutter (SUI)	Cilo–Aufina–Magniflex	s.t.
8	Giuseppe Martinelli (ITA)	Alfa Lum–Olmo	s.t.
9	Luciano Rabottini (ITA)	Metauro Mobili–Pinarello	s.t.
10	Johan van der Velde (NED)	Metauro Mobili–Pinarello	s.t.

General classification after Stage 12

Rank	Rider	Team	Time
1	Francesco Moser (ITA)	Gis Gelati–Tuc Lu	54h 49' 32"
2	Moreno Argentin (ITA)	Sammontana	+ 39"
3	Roberto Visentini (ITA)	Carrera–Inoxpran	+ 49"
4	Laurent Fignon (FRA)	Renault–Elf	+ 54"
5	Marino Lejarreta (ESP)	Alfa Lum–Olmo	+ 1' 35"
6	Johan van der Velde (NED)	Metauro Mobili–Pinarello	+ 1' 54"
7	Acácio da Silva (POR)	Malvor–Bottecchia	+ 2' 06"
8	Beat Breu (SUI)	Cilo–Aufina–Magniflex	+ 2' 10"
9	Giovanni Battaglin (ITA)	Carrera–Inoxpran	+ 2' 14"
10	Mario Beccia (ITA)	Malvor–Bottecchia	+ 2' 16"

== Stage 13 ==
31 May 1984 — Città di Castello to Lerici, 269 km (167 mi)

Stage 13 result

Rank	Rider	Team	Time
1	Roberto Visentini (ITA)	Carrera–Inoxpran	7h 27' 00"
2	Laurent Fignon (FRA)	Renault–Elf	+ 19"
3	Dag Erik Pedersen (NOR)	Murella	s.t.
4	Moreno Argentin (ITA)	Sammontana	s.t.
5	Johan van der Velde (NED)	Metauro Mobili–Pinarello	s.t.
6	Eddy Schepers (BEL)	Dromedario	s.t.
7	Francesco Moser (ITA)	Gis Gelati–Tuc Lu	s.t.
8	Acácio da Silva (POR)	Malvor–Bottecchia	s.t.
9	Alfio Vandi (ITA)	Dromedario	s.t.
10	Charly Mottet (FRA)	Renault–Elf	s.t.

General classification after Stage 13

Rank	Rider	Team	Time
1	Francesco Moser (ITA)	Gis Gelati–Tuc Lu	62h 16' 51"
2	Roberto Visentini (ITA)	Carrera–Inoxpran	+ 10"
3	Moreno Argentin (ITA)	Sammontana	+ 34"
4	Laurent Fignon (FRA)	Renault–Elf	+ 39"
5	Marino Lejarreta (ESP)	Alfa Lum–Olmo	+ 1' 35"
6	Johan van der Velde (NED)	Metauro Mobili–Pinarello	+ 1' 54"
7	Acácio da Silva (POR)	Malvor–Bottecchia	+ 2' 06"
8	Beat Breu (SUI)	Cilo–Aufina–Magniflex	+ 2' 10"
9	Mario Beccia (ITA)	Malvor–Bottecchia	+ 2' 43"
10	Wladimiro Panizza (ITA)	Atala	+ 2' 54"

== Stage 14 ==
1 June 1984 — Lerici to Alessandria, 204 km (127 mi)

Stage 14 result

Rank	Rider	Team	Time
1	Sergio Santimaria (ITA)	Del Tongo–Colnago	4h 40' 20"
2	Pierre-Henri Menthéour (FRA)	Renault–Elf	+ 15"
3	Emanuele Bombini (ITA)	Del Tongo–Colnago	+ 24"
4	Juan Fernández (ESP)	Zor–Gemeaz Cusin	+ 48"
5	Franco Chioccioli (ITA)	Murella	s.t.
6	Flavio Zappi (ITA)	Metauro Mobili–Pinarello	s.t.
7	Rudy Pevenage (BEL)	Del Tongo–Colnago	s.t.
8	Glauco Santoni (ITA)	Carrera–Inoxpran	s.t.
9	Urs Freuler (SUI)	Atala	+ 2' 55"
10	Giovanni Mantovani (ITA)	Malvor–Bottecchia	s.t.

General classification after Stage 14

Rank	Rider	Team	Time
1	Francesco Moser (ITA)	Gis Gelati–Tuc Lu	67h 00' 26"
2	Roberto Visentini (ITA)	Carrera–Inoxpran	+ 10"
3	Moreno Argentin (ITA)	Sammontana	+ 34"
4	Laurent Fignon (FRA)	Renault–Elf	+ 39"
5	Marino Lejarreta (ESP)	Alfa Lum–Olmo	+ 1' 35"
6	Johan van der Velde (NED)	Metauro Mobili–Pinarello	+ 1' 54"
7	Acácio da Silva (POR)	Malvor–Bottecchia	+ 2' 06"
8	Beat Breu (SUI)	Cilo–Aufina–Magniflex	+ 2' 10"
9	Mario Beccia (ITA)	Malvor–Bottecchia	+ 2' 43"
10	Wladimiro Panizza (ITA)	Atala	+ 2' 54"

== Stage 15 ==
2 June 1984 — Certosa di Pavia to Milan, 38 km (24 mi) (ITT)

Stage 15 result

Rank	Rider	Team	Time
1	Francesco Moser (ITA)	Gis Gelati–Tuc Lu	47' 39"
2	Roberto Visentini (ITA)	Carrera–Inoxpran	+ 53"
3	Urs Freuler (SUI)	Atala	+ 1' 15"
4	Gianbattista Baronchelli (ITA)	Murella	+ 1' 18"
5	Daniel Willems (BEL)	Murella	+ 1' 19"
6	Giuseppe Saronni (ITA)	Del Tongo–Colnago	+ 1' 21"
7	Czesław Lang (POL)	Carrera–Inoxpran	+ 1' 24"
8	Laurent Fignon (FRA)	Renault–Elf	+ 1' 28"
9	Moreno Argentin (ITA)	Sammontana	+ 1' 33"
10	Siegfried Hekimi (SUI)	Dromedario	+ 1' 40"

General classification after Stage 15

Rank	Rider	Team	Time
1	Francesco Moser (ITA)	Gis Gelati–Tuc Lu	67h 48' 05"
2	Roberto Visentini (ITA)	Carrera–Inoxpran	+ 1' 03"
3	Moreno Argentin (ITA)	Sammontana	+ 2' 07"
4	Laurent Fignon (FRA)	Renault–Elf	s.t.
5	Marino Lejarreta (ESP)	Alfa Lum–Olmo	+ 3' 31"
6	Johan van der Velde (NED)	Metauro Mobili–Pinarello	+ 4' 30"
7	Mario Beccia (ITA)	Malvor–Bottecchia	+ 4' 31"
8	Acácio da Silva (POR)	Malvor–Bottecchia	+ 4' 53"
9	Gianbattista Baronchelli (ITA)	Murella	+ 5' 15"
10	Giuseppe Saronni (ITA)	Del Tongo–Colnago	+ 5' 24"

== Rest day 2 ==
3 June 1984

== Stage 16 ==
4 June 1984 — Alessandria to Bardonecchia, 198 km (123 mi)

Stage 16 result

Rank	Rider	Team	Time
1	Dag Erik Pedersen (NOR)	Murella	5h 27' 03"
2	Alfredo Chinetti (ITA)	Supermercati Brianzoli	+ 3"
3	Johan van der Velde (NED)	Metauro Mobili–Pinarello	s.t.
4	Bernard Gavillet (SUI)	Cilo–Aufina–Magniflex	+ 5"
5	Marino Lejarreta (ESP)	Alfa Lum–Olmo	s.t.
6	Charly Mottet (FRA)	Renault–Elf	s.t.
7	Moreno Argentin (ITA)	Sammontana	+ 10"
8	Frits Pirard (NED)	Metauro Mobili–Pinarello	+ 11"
9	Gerhard Zadrobilek (AUT)	Atala	s.t.
10	Franco Chioccioli (ITA)	Murella	s.t.

General classification after Stage 16

Rank	Rider	Team	Time
1	Francesco Moser (ITA)	Gis Gelati–Tuc Lu	73h 15' 19"
2	Roberto Visentini (ITA)	Carrera–Inoxpran	+ 1' 03"
3	Moreno Argentin (ITA)	Sammontana	+ 2' 06"
4	Laurent Fignon (FRA)	Renault–Elf	+ 2' 07"
5	Marino Lejarreta (ESP)	Alfa Lum–Olmo	+ 3' 25"
6	Johan van der Velde (NED)	Metauro Mobili–Pinarello	+ 4' 12"
7	Mario Beccia (ITA)	Malvor–Bottecchia	+ 4' 44"
8	Acácio da Silva (POR)	Malvor–Bottecchia	+ 5' 03"
9	Gianbattista Baronchelli (ITA)	Murella	+ 5' 15"
10	Giuseppe Saronni (ITA)	Del Tongo–Colnago	+ 5' 24"

== Stage 17 ==
5 June 1984 — Bardonecchia to Lecco, 249 km (155 mi)

Stage 17 result

Rank	Rider	Team	Time
1	Jürg Bruggmann (SUI)	Malvor–Bottecchia	6h 46' 27"
2	Acácio da Silva (POR)	Malvor–Bottecchia	+ 2"
3	Stefan Mutter (SUI)	Cilo–Aufina–Magniflex	s.t.
4	Johan van der Velde (NED)	Metauro Mobili–Pinarello	s.t.
5	Gerhard Zadrobilek (AUT)	Atala	s.t.
6	Marino Lejarreta (ESP)	Alfa Lum–Olmo	s.t.
7	Cesare Cipollini (ITA)	Dromedario	s.t.
8	Giovanni Mantovani (ITA)	Malvor–Bottecchia	s.t.
9	Frits Pirard (NED)	Metauro Mobili–Pinarello	s.t.
10	Dag Erik Pedersen (NOR)	Murella	s.t.

General classification after Stage 17

Rank	Rider	Team	Time
1	Francesco Moser (ITA)	Gis Gelati–Tuc Lu	80h 01' 48"
2	Roberto Visentini (ITA)	Carrera–Inoxpran	+ 1' 03"
3	Moreno Argentin (ITA)	Sammontana	+ 2' 06"
4	Laurent Fignon (FRA)	Renault–Elf	+ 2' 07"
5	Marino Lejarreta (ESP)	Alfa Lum–Olmo	+ 3' 25"
6	Johan van der Velde (NED)	Metauro Mobili–Pinarello	+ 4' 07"
7	Mario Beccia (ITA)	Malvor–Bottecchia	+ 4' 44"
8	Acácio da Silva (POR)	Malvor–Bottecchia	+ 4' 48"
9	Gianbattista Baronchelli (ITA)	Murella	+ 5' 15"
10	Giuseppe Saronni (ITA)	Del Tongo–Colnago	+ 5' 24"

== Stage 18 ==
6 June 1984 — Lecco to Merano, 252 km (157 mi)

Stage 18 result

Rank	Rider	Team	Time
1	Bruno Leali (ITA)	Carrera–Inoxpran	6h 15' 19"
2	Dag Erik Pedersen (NOR)	Murella	+ 5"
3	Maurizio Piovani (ITA)	Del Tongo–Colnago	s.t.
4	Martial Gayant (FRA)	Renault–Elf	s.t.
5	Francesco Moser (ITA)	Gis Gelati–Tuc Lu	s.t.
6	Johan van der Velde (NED)	Metauro Mobili–Pinarello	s.t.
7	Stefan Mutter (SUI)	Cilo–Aufina–Magniflex	s.t.
8	Daniele Caroli (ITA)	Santini	s.t.
9	Alfredo Chinetti (ITA)	Supermercati Brianzoli	s.t.
10	Salvatore Maccali (ITA)	Alfa Lum–Olmo	s.t.

General classification after Stage 18

Rank	Rider	Team	Time
1	Francesco Moser (ITA)	Gis Gelati–Tuc Lu	86h 17' 12"
2	Roberto Visentini (ITA)	Carrera–Inoxpran	+ 1' 03"
3	Moreno Argentin (ITA)	Sammontana	+ 2' 06"
4	Laurent Fignon (FRA)	Renault–Elf	+ 2' 07"
5	Marino Lejarreta (ESP)	Alfa Lum–Olmo	+ 3' 25"
6	Johan van der Velde (NED)	Metauro Mobili–Pinarello	+ 4' 07"
7	Mario Beccia (ITA)	Malvor–Bottecchia	+ 4' 44"
8	Acácio da Silva (POR)	Malvor–Bottecchia	+ 4' 48"
9	Gianbattista Baronchelli (ITA)	Murella	+ 5' 15"
10	Giuseppe Saronni (ITA)	Del Tongo–Colnago	+ 5' 24"

== Stage 19 ==
7 June 1984 — Merano to Selva di Val Gardena, 74 km (46 mi)

Stage 19 result

Rank	Rider	Team	Time
1	Marino Lejarreta (ESP)	Alfa Lum–Olmo	1h 56' 41"
2	Laurent Fignon (FRA)	Renault–Elf	+ 1' 08"
3	Moreno Argentin (ITA)	Sammontana	s.t.
4	Gianbattista Baronchelli (ITA)	Murella	s.t.
5	Lucien Van Impe (BEL)	Metauro Mobili–Pinarello	s.t.
6	Mario Beccia (ITA)	Malvor–Bottecchia	s.t.
7	Eddy Schepers (BEL)	Dromedario	s.t.
8	Beat Breu (SUI)	Cilo–Aufina–Magniflex	s.t.
9	Faustino Rupérez (ESP)	Zor–Gemeaz Cusin	s.t.
10	Wladimiro Panizza (ITA)	Atala	s.t.

General classification after Stage 19

Rank	Rider	Team	Time
1	Francesco Moser (ITA)	Gis Gelati–Tuc Lu	88h 15' 50"
2	Laurent Fignon (FRA)	Renault–Elf	+ 1' 03"
3	Moreno Argentin (ITA)	Sammontana	+ 1' 07"
4	Marino Lejarreta (ESP)	Alfa Lum–Olmo	+ 1' 08"
5	Mario Beccia (ITA)	Malvor–Bottecchia	+ 3' 55"
6	Gianbattista Baronchelli (ITA)	Murella	+ 4' 21"
7	Beat Breu (SUI)	Cilo–Aufina–Magniflex	+ 4' 43"
8	Johan van der Velde (NED)	Metauro Mobili–Pinarello	+ 4' 57"
9	Wladimiro Panizza (ITA)	Atala	+ 5' 27"
10	Acácio da Silva (POR)	Malvor–Bottecchia	+ 5' 28"

== Stage 20 ==
8 June 1984 — Selva di Val Gardena to Arabba, 169 km (105 mi)

Stage 20 result

Rank	Rider	Team	Time
1	Laurent Fignon (FRA)	Renault–Elf	4h 30' 24"
2	Johan van der Velde (NED)	Metauro Mobili–Pinarello	+ 20"
3	Moreno Argentin (ITA)	Sammontana	+ 1' 52"
4	Dag Erik Pedersen (NOR)	Murella	s.t.
5	Luciano Loro (ITA)	Carrera–Inoxpran	+ 1' 54"
6	Lucien Van Impe (BEL)	Metauro Mobili–Pinarello	s.t.
7	Marino Lejarreta (ESP)	Alfa Lum–Olmo	s.t.
8	Francesco Moser (ITA)	Gis Gelati–Tuc Lu	+ 2' 19"
9	Gianbattista Baronchelli (ITA)	Murella	+ 2' 20"
10	Beat Breu (SUI)	Cilo–Aufina–Magniflex	+ 2' 29"

General classification after Stage 20

Rank	Rider	Team	Time
1	Laurent Fignon (FRA)	Renault–Elf	92h 47' 09"
2	Francesco Moser (ITA)	Gis Gelati–Tuc Lu	+ 1' 31"
3	Moreno Argentin (ITA)	Sammontana	+ 1' 56"
4	Marino Lejarreta (ESP)	Alfa Lum–Olmo	+ 2' 09"
5	Johan van der Velde (NED)	Metauro Mobili–Pinarello	+ 4' 09"
6	Gianbattista Baronchelli (ITA)	Murella	+ 5' 48"
7	Beat Breu (SUI)	Cilo–Aufina–Magniflex	+ 6' 19"
8	Lucien Van Impe (BEL)	Metauro Mobili–Pinarello	+ 6' 46"
9	Mario Beccia (ITA)	Malvor–Bottecchia	+ 8' 25"
10	Dag Erik Pedersen (NOR)	Murella	+ 9' 23"

== Stage 21 ==
9 June 1984 — Arabba to Treviso, 208 km (129 mi)

Stage 21 result

Rank	Rider	Team	Time
1	Guido Bontempi (ITA)	Carrera–Inoxpran	4h 54' 24"
2	Paolo Rosola (ITA)	Bianchi–Piaggio	s.t.
3	Francesco Moser (ITA)	Gis Gelati–Tuc Lu	s.t.
4	Dag Erik Pedersen (NOR)	Murella	s.t.
5	Johan van der Velde (NED)	Metauro Mobili–Pinarello	s.t.
6	Stefan Mutter (SUI)	Cilo–Aufina–Magniflex	s.t.
7	Mauro Longo (ITA)	Supermercati Brianzoli	s.t.
8	Pierino Gavazzi (ITA)	Atala	s.t.
9	Frits Pirard (NED)	Metauro Mobili–Pinarello	s.t.
10	Jens Veggerby (DEN)	Fanini–Wührer	s.t.

General classification after Stage 21

Rank	Rider	Team	Time
1	Laurent Fignon (FRA)	Renault–Elf	97h 41' 33"
2	Francesco Moser (ITA)	Gis Gelati–Tuc Lu	+ 1' 21"
3	Moreno Argentin (ITA)	Sammontana	+ 1' 56"
4	Marino Lejarreta (ESP)	Alfa Lum–Olmo	+ 2' 09"
5	Johan van der Velde (NED)	Metauro Mobili–Pinarello	+ 4' 09"
6	Gianbattista Baronchelli (ITA)	Murella	+ 5' 48"
7	Beat Breu (SUI)	Cilo–Aufina–Magniflex	+ 6' 19"
8	Lucien Van Impe (BEL)	Metauro Mobili–Pinarello	+ 6' 48"
9	Mario Beccia (ITA)	Malvor–Bottecchia	+ 8' 25"
10	Dag Erik Pedersen (NOR)	Murella	+ 9' 17"

== Stage 22 ==
10 June 1984 — Soave to Verona, 42 km (26 mi) (ITT)

Stage 22 result

Rank	Rider	Team	Time
1	Francesco Moser (ITA)	Gis Gelati–Tuc Lu	49' 26"
2	Laurent Fignon (FRA)	Renault–Elf	+ 2' 24"
3	Daniel Gisiger (SUI)	Atala	+ 2' 38"
4	Urs Freuler (SUI)	Atala	+ 2' 44"
5	Daniel Willems (BEL)	Murella	+ 2' 48"
6	Gianbattista Baronchelli (ITA)	Murella	+ 3' 21"
7	Czesław Lang (POL)	Carrera–Inoxpran	+ 3' 39"
8	Siegfried Hekimi (SUI)	Dromedario	+ 3' 41"
9	Charly Mottet (FRA)	Renault–Elf	+ 3' 45"
10	Marino Lejarreta (ESP)	Alfa Lum–Olmo	s.t.

General classification after Stage 22

Rank	Rider	Team	Time
1	Francesco Moser (ITA)	Gis Gelati–Tuc Lu	98h 32' 20"
2	Laurent Fignon (FRA)	Renault–Elf	+ 1' 03"
3	Moreno Argentin (ITA)	Sammontana	+ 4' 26"
4	Marino Lejarreta (ESP)	Alfa Lum–Olmo	+ 4' 33"
5	Johan van der Velde (NED)	Metauro Mobili–Pinarello	+ 6' 56"
6	Gianbattista Baronchelli (ITA)	Murella	+ 7' 48"
7	Lucien Van Impe (BEL)	Metauro Mobili–Pinarello	+ 10' 19"
8	Beat Breu (SUI)	Cilo–Aufina–Magniflex	+ 11' 39"
9	Mario Beccia (ITA)	Malvor–Bottecchia	+ 11' 41"
10	Dag Erik Pedersen (NOR)	Murella	+ 13' 35"
