= Vanotti =

Vanotti is an Italian surname. Notable people with that name include:

- Alessandro Vanotti (born 1980), Italian cyclist
- Ennio Vanotti (born 1955), Italian cyclist
