= 1983 Gent–Wevelgem =

Race details
- Dates: 6 April 1983
- Stages: 1
- Distance: 255 km (158 mi)
- Winning time: 6h 29' 08"

Results
	Winner	Leo van Vliet (NED)	(TI–Raleigh–Campagnolo)
	Second	Jan Raas (NED)	(TI–Raleigh–Campagnolo)
	Third	Frank Hoste (BEL)	(Europ Decor–Dries)

The 1983 Gent–Wevelgem was the 45th edition of the Belgian Gent–Wevelgem cycle race and was held on 6 April 1983. The race started in Ghent and finished in Wevelgem. The race was won by Leo van Vliet of the TI–Raleigh team.

== General classification ==
Final general classification

Rank	Rider	Team	Time
1	Leo van Vliet (NED)	TI–Raleigh–Campagnolo	6h 29' 08"
2	Jan Raas (NED)	TI–Raleigh–Campagnolo	+ 20"
3	Frank Hoste (BEL)	Europ Decor–Dries	+ 20"
4	Adri van der Poel (NED)	Jacky Aernoudt–Rossin–Campagnolo	+ 20"
5	Etienne De Wilde (BEL)	La Redoute–Motobécane	+ 20"
6	Gregor Braun (FRG)	Vivi–Benotto–Puma	+ 20"
7	Pierino Gavazzi (ITA)	Atala	+ 20"
8	Stefan Mutter (SUI)	Eorotex–Magniflex	+ 20"
9	Ludo Peeters (BEL)	TI–Raleigh–Campagnolo	+ 20"
10	Valerio Piva (ITA)	Bianchi–Piaggio	+ 20"
