= Marc Somers =

Belgian cyclist

Personal information
- Born: 28 June 1961 (age 65) Duffel, Belgium

Cycling career
- Sport: Cycling
- Role: Rider

Marc Somers (born 28 June 1961) is a Belgian former professional racing cyclist. He rode in the 1984 Tour de France.
