= Riccardo Magrini =

Italian cyclist and sporting director

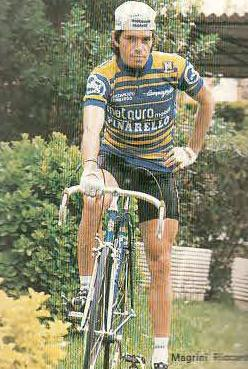

Personal information
- Full name: Riccardo Magrini
- Born: 26 December 1954 (age 71) Montecatini Terme, Italy

Cycling career
- Sport: Cycling
- Discipline: Road
- Role: Rider

Major wins
- 1 stage 1983 Tour de France

Riccardo Magrini (Montecatini Terme, 26 December 1954) is an Italian former professional road bicycle racer and sporting director. In 1983 Magrini won a stage in the 1983 Giro d'Italia and in the 1983 Tour de France. He was a professional from 1977 to 1986. His career as a DS ended in 2004. Since then, he has been a cycling commentator for the Italian Eurosport channel.

== Major results ==
1982
Giro della Provincia di Reggio Calabria
1983
Giro d'Italia:

Winner stage 9

Tour de France:

Winner stage 7
