= Valerio Piva =

Italian cyclist

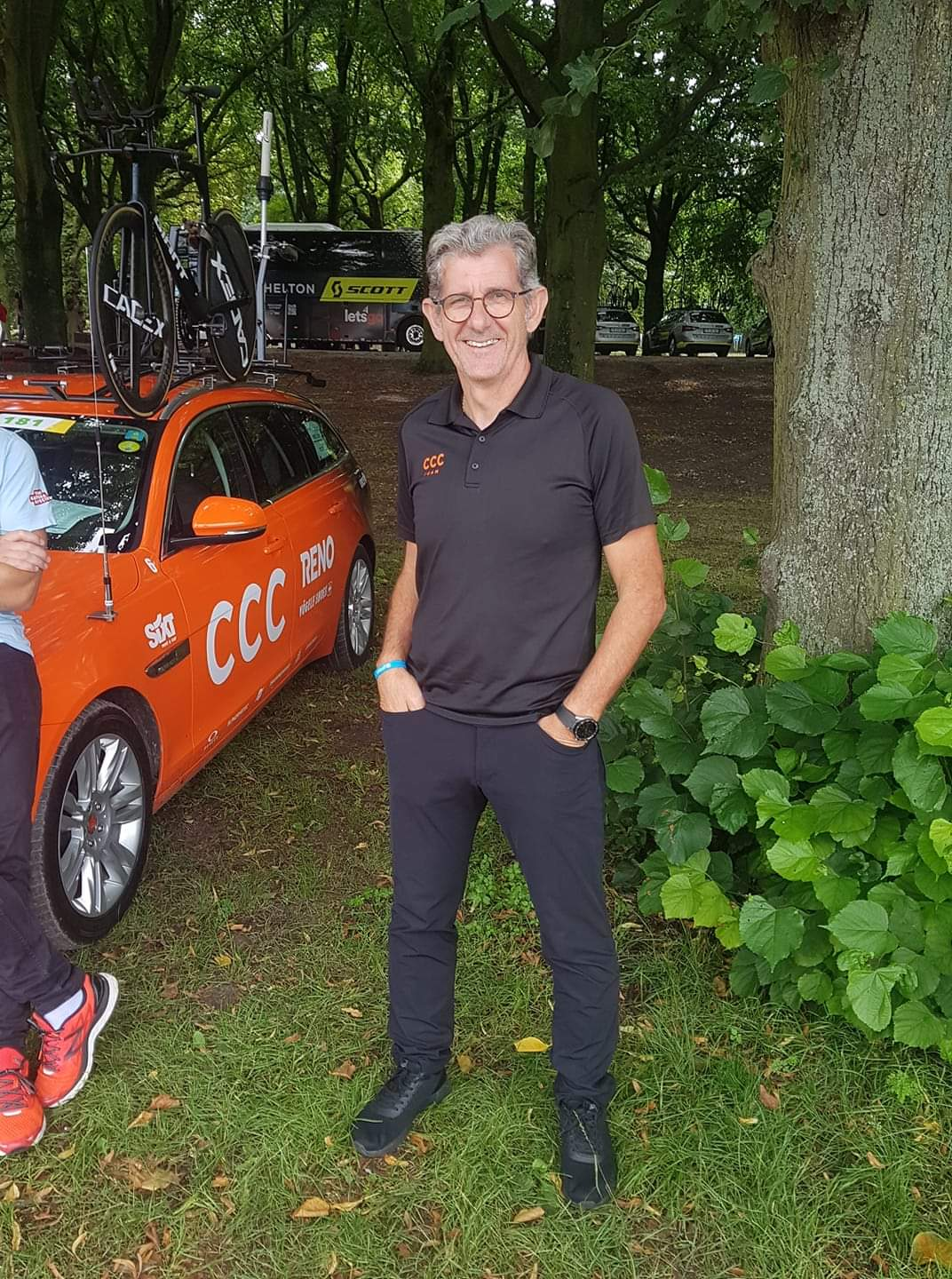

Personal information
- Born: 5 July 1958 (age 68) Ceresara, Italy

Cycling career
- Sport: Cycling
- Current team: Intermarché–Wanty
- Discipline: Road
- Role: Rider (retired); Directeur sportif

Professional teams
- 1982–1984: Bianchi–Piaggio
- 1985–1986: Sammontana
- 1987–1991: Ariostea–Gres

Managerial teams
- 2002: Mapei–Quick-Step
- 2003–2004: Vlaanderen–T Interim Ladies Team
- 2005–2011: T-Mobile Team
- 2012–2013: Team Katusha
- 2014–2020: BMC Racing Team
- 2021–: Intermarché–Wanty–Gobert Matériaux

Valerio Piva (born 5 July 1958) is an Italian former racing cyclist who currently works as a directeur sportif for UCI WorldTeam Intermarché–Wanty. He rode in the 1990 Tour de France and in five editions of the Giro d'Italia.

== Major results ==
1980
2nd GP Capodarco
1981
1st Stage 5 Giro Ciclistico d'Italia
1982
9th Overall Setmana Catalana de Ciclisme
1983
7th Overall Giro di Sardegna
10th Gent–Wevelgem
1987
2nd Trofeo Laigueglia
9th Grand Prix Pino Cerami
1991
5th GP Rik Van Steenbergen

=== Grand Tour general classification results timeline ===
Grand Tour	1983	1984	1985	1986	1987	1988	1989	1990
Giro d'Italia	112	81	—	59	74	100	—	—
Tour de France	—	—	—	—	—	—	—	109
Vuelta a España	Did not contest during his career							
