= Siegfried Hekimi =

Swiss cyclist

Personal information
- Born: 5 September 1956 (age 70) Geneva, Switzerland

Cycling career
- Sport: Cycling
- Role: Rider

Siegfried Hekimi (born 5 September 1956) is a Swiss former professional racing cyclist and a professor in the Biology Department of McGill University, specializing in the study of aging.

He rode in the 1982 Tour de France. After his cycling career, Hekimi obtained a Ph.D. in neurobiology at the University of Geneva.

Hekimi was born in Zürich, on 5 September 1956. He became a full professor in 2004 at McGill University and his research has extended to include mouse models of aging and of age-dependent diseases.

== Education ==
Between 1984 and 1988, he obtained a Ph.D. in Neurobiology, at the University of Geneva, Switzerland.

== Research ==
Hekimi uses nematode Caenorhabditis elegans for translational studies in the biology of aging; in particular the genetic, cellular, and molecular mechanisms of the organisms. He believes the findings will translate into higher organisms like mice and humans.
