= Ennio Vanotti =

Italian cyclist

Personal information
- Born: 13 September 1955 (age 71) Almenno San Bartolomeo, Italy

Cycling career
- Sport: Cycling
- Role: Rider

Ennio Vanotti (born 13 September 1955) is an Italian former racing cyclist. He rode in seventeen Grand Tours between 1978 and 1990.
