= Eduardo Chozas =

Spanish cyclist (born 1960)

Personal information
- Full name: Eduardo Chozas Olmo
- Born: 5 July 1960 (age 66) Madrid, Spain

Cycling career
- Sport: Cycling
- Current team: Retired
- Discipline: Road
- Role: Rider
- Rider type: Climbing specialist

Professional teams
- 1980–1984: Fosforera–Vereco MG
- 1985: Reynolds
- 1986–1987: Teka
- 1988: Kelme
- 1989–1991: ONCE
- 1992–1993: Artiach–Royal

Major wins
- Giro d'Italia, 3 stages Tour de France, Combativity award (1990); 4 stages

Eduardo Chozas Olmo (born 5 July 1960 in Madrid) is a Spanish former professional road racing cyclist. He won four stages at the Tour de France and three in the Giro d'Italia. He was also chosen as the most combative rider of 1990 Tour de France.

As of 2014, Chozas holds the record for most Grand Tour participations and finishes. He started in a total of 27 Grand Tours (6 Tours, 8 Giros and 13 Vueltas), and finished in 26 of them, only abandoning the 1984 Vuelta a España on the last stage.

== Career achievements ==
=== Major results ===
1979
3rd Clásica a los Puertos
1980
2nd Overall Vuelta a la Comunidad Valenciana
9th Overall Deutschland Tour

1st Stage 5b

1981
2nd Overall Vuelta Asturias

1st Stage 1

3rd Clásica a los Puertos
1983
1st Overall Vuelta Ciclista a la Rioja
1st Overall Vuelta a Andalucía

1st Stage 2

1st Clásica de Sabiñánigo
1st GP Camp de Morvedre
3rd Overall Vuelta a Burgos
3rd Clásica a los Puertos
6th Overall Vuelta a España
8th Overall Giro d'Italia

1st Stage 5

1984
1st Stage 4 Vuelta a la Comunidad Valenciana
3rd Overall Setmana Catalana de Ciclisme
10th Overall Volta a Catalunya
1985
3rd Overall Tour de l'Aude
7th Subida a Arrate
8th Overall Route du Sud
9th Overall Tour de France

1st Stage 15

1986
1st Stage 17 Tour de France
1987
1st Stage 22 Tour de France
3rd Trofeo Luis Puig
6th Trofeo Masferrer
9th Overall Critérium du Dauphiné Libéré
1990
1st Overall Vuelta a Andalucía
1st Stage 2 Giro d'Italia
3rd Overall Vuelta a Murcia
6th Overall Tour de France

1st Stage 13
Combativity award

1991
5th Overall Vuelta a Murcia

1st Stage 4a

10th Overall Giro d'Italia

1st Stage 13

1992
3rd Clásica a los Puertos
1993
2nd Clásica de Almería
5th Overall Vuelta a Murcia

=== Grand Tour general classification results timeline ===
Year	1980	1981	1982	1983	1984	1985	1986	1987	1988	1989	1990	1991	1992	1993
Vuelta a España	36	11	14	6	DNF	29	24	36	67	24	33	11	43	22
Giro d'Italia	—	16	19	8	45	—	—	—	—	—	11	10	—	32
Tour de France	—	—	—	—	—	9	14	25	30	—	6	11	—	—
