= Alf Segersäll =

Swedish cyclist

Personal information
- Full name: Alf Ove Segersäll
- Born: 16 March 1956 (age 70) Virsbo, Sweden
- Height: 1.75 m (5 ft 9 in)
- Weight: 65 kg (143 lb)

Cycling career
- Sport: Cycling
- Current team: Retired
- Discipline: Road
- Role: Rider

Professional team
- 1980–1986: Bianchi–Piaggio

Major wins
- Grand Tours Giro d'Italia 1 individual stage (1983) 1 TTT stage (1983)

Alf Ove Segersäll (born 16 March 1956) is a Swedish former racing cyclist. He competed in the individual road race event at the 1976 Summer Olympics.

His sporting career began with IF SAAB Linköping.

== Major results ==
1973
1st Road race, National Junior Road Championships
1974
1st Road race, National Junior Road Championships
1st Overall International 3-Etappen-Rundfahrt
1975
1st Skandisloppet
3rd Road race, National Road Championships
1976
1st Stage 8 Okolo Slovenska
1977
1st Road race, National Road Championships
1st Overall Flèche du Sud
2nd Overall Giro Ciclistico d'Italia
2nd Overall Milk Race
1978
1st Overall Flèche du Sud
8th Overall Circuit Cycliste Sarthe
1979
1st Overall Giro Ciclistico d'Italia

1st Stage 5

1980
1st Stage 3 Giro di Sardegna
2nd Coppa Bernocchi
4th Overall Tirreno–Adriatico
7th Coppa Placci
8th Overall Deutschland Tour
1981
1st Trofeo Matteotti
1st Stage 4 Tour de Romandie
1982
1st Overall Giro di Puglia

1st Stages 2 & 3

1st Overall Ruota d'Oro

1st Stage 2

4th Overall Tour of Sweden

1st Stage 3

1983
1st Stages 1 (TTT) & 12 Giro d'Italia
3rd Trofeo Baracchi (with Tommy Prim)
1984
2nd Trofeo Baracchi (with Tommy Prim)
2nd Overall Tour of Sweden
1985
10th GP Industria & Artigianato di Larciano

=== Grand Tour general classification results timeline ===
Grand Tour	1981	1982	1983	1984	1985
Giro d'Italia	58	66	78	74	DNF
Tour de France	—	—	—	—	—
Vuelta a España	—	—	—	—	—

Legend
—	Did not compete
DNF	Did not finish
