= Vivi–Benotto =

Cycling team (1982-1983)

Team information
- Registered: Italy
- Founded: 1982
- Disbanded: 1983
- Discipline: Road

Key personnel
- Team managers: Franco Montanelli; Luciano Pezzi

Team name history
- 1982 1983: Selle Italia–Chinol; Vivi–Benotto–Selle Italia–Puma

Vivi–Benotto, known as Selle Italia–Chinol in 1982, was an Italian professional cycling team that existed from 1982 to 1983.

The team competed in the 1982 and 1983 Giro d'Italia.

== Major wins ==
1983
Giro d'Italia

Young rider classification, Franco Chioccioli
Stage 14, Gregor Braun

Giro di Sardegna, Gregor Braun
Stage 1 Giro del Trentino, Franco Chioccioli
