= Alessandro Paganessi =

Italian cyclist

Personal information
- Born: 31 January 1959 (age 67)

Cycling career
- Sport: Cycling
- Role: Rider

Alessandro Paganessi (born 31 January 1959) is an Italian former racing cyclist. He won stage 20 of the 1983 Giro d'Italia. In 1979 he won Coppa Città di San Daniele.
