= Dromedario (cycling team) =

Cycling team (1983-1987)

Team information
- Registered: Italy (1983–1986); Switzerland (1987)
- Founded: 1983
- Disbanded: 1987
- Discipline: Road

Key personnel
- Team managers: Carlo Menicagli; Alessio Antonini

Team name history
- 1983–1984 1985–1986 1987: Dromedario–Alan–Sidermec; Dromedario–Laminox–Fibok; Fibok–Sidermec–Müller

Dromedario, also known as Fibok–Sidermec–Müller, was an Italian and Swiss professional cycling team that existed from 1983 to 1987.

The team competed in five consecutive editions of the Giro d'Italia, having entered each year of its existence.

== Major wins ==
1983
Giro dell'Emilia, Cesare Cipollini
1985
Gran Premio di Lugano, Gottfried Schmutz
Giro della Provincia di Reggio Calabria, Silvano Riccò
1986
Giro dell'Umbria, Stefano Colagè
