= Giuliano Pavanello =

Italian cyclist

Personal information
- Born: 29 November 1961 (age 64) Musile di Piave, Italy

Cycling career
- Sport: Cycling
- Role: Rider

Giuliano Pavanello (born 29 November 1961) is an Italian former professional racing cyclist. He rode in the 1985 Tour de France.
