= Gewiss–Bianchi =

Cycling team (1979–1989)

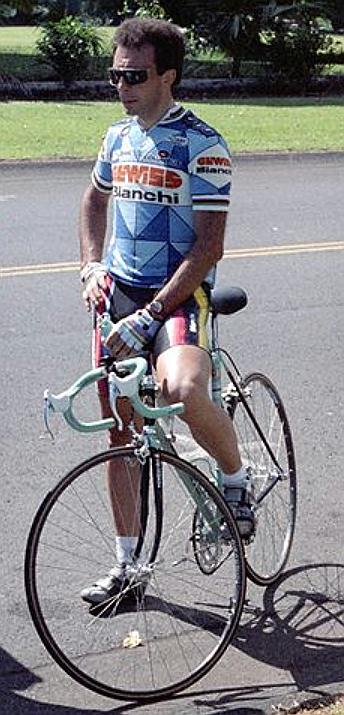
- Moreno Argentin in 1987

Team information
- Registered: Italy
- Founded: 1979
- Disbanded: 1989
- Discipline: Road

Key personnel
- General manager: Primo Franchini
- Team managers: Waldemaro Bartolozzi; Domenico De Lillo; Serge Parsani

Team name history
- 1979 1980 1981–1982 1983–1984 1985–1986 1987–1989: San Giacomo–Mobilificio–Alan; Mobili San Giacomo–Benotto; Sammontana–Benotto; Sammontana–Campagnolo; Sammontana–Bianchi; Gewiss–Bianchi

Gewiss–Bianchi was an Italian professional cycling team that existed from 1979 to 1989.

The team was selected to race in eleven consecutive editions of the Giro d'Italia from 1979 to 1989, where they achieved 19 stage wins.

Gewiss sponsored the team from 1987 to 1989; the later Gewiss–Ballan team originated as a new project, Mecair–Ballan, in January 1993 and adopted the Gewiss name when the company replaced Mecair as title sponsor in 1994.

== Major wins ==
1979
Stage 15 Giro d'Italia, Giuseppe Martinelli
1980
Giro d'Italia

Mountains classification, Claudio Bortolotto
Stage 16, Giuseppe Martinelli

Vuelta a España

Prologue & Stage 16b, Roberto Visentini
Stage 3, Giuseppe Martinelli

1981
Stages 8 & 12 Giro d'Italia, Moreno Argentin
1982
Stage 8 Giro d'Italia, Moreno Argentin
1983
Giro del Veneto, Alfio Vandi
Stages 7 & 21 Giro d'Italia, Moreno Argentin
1984
Giro del Veneto, Jesper Worre
Stages 3 & 5 Giro d'Italia, Moreno Argentin
1985
Giro d'Italia

Young rider classification, Alberto Volpi
Stages 9 & 18, Paolo Rosola

1987
Stage 1 Vuelta a Andalucía, Moreno Argentin
Stages 2 & 4 Tirreno–Adriatico, Moreno Argentin
Liège–Bastogne–Liège, Moreno Argentin
Stage 2 Vuelta a España, Paolo Rosola
Stages 5 & 17 Vuelta a España, Roberto Pagnin
Stages 2, 4 & 7 Giro d'Italia, Moreno Argentin
Stages 8, 10 & 20 Giro d'Italia, Paolo Rosola
Stage 2 Coors Classic, Emanuele Bombini
Stages 5, 11, 12b & 15 Coors Classic, Paolo Rosola
Stage 16 Coors Classic, Moreno Argentin
Schaan Criterium, Paolo Rosola
Giro di Lombardia, Moreno Argentin
Giro di Toscana, Renato Piccolo
1988
Stage 1 Critérium International, Moreno Argentin
Stages 10 & 20 Giro d'Italia, Paolo Rosola
Overall Tour of Sweden, Jesper Worre
Overall Grabs–Voralp, Arno Küttel

Stage 1a, Arno Küttel

Sweden National Road Race Championships, Lars Wahlqvist
Giro del Veneto, Moreno Argentin
Visp–Grächen, Arno Küttel
Stage 5b Tour of Denmark, Paolo Rosola
1989
Stage 3 Vuelta a Andalucía, Paolo Rosola
GP du canton d'Argovie, Paolo Rosola
Italy National Road Race Championships, Moreno Argentin
Stage 5 GP Guillaume Tell, Davide Cassani
