= Paolo Rosola =

Italian cyclist

Personal information
- Full name: Paolo Rosola
- Born: 5 February 1957 (age 69) Gussago, Italy

Cycling career
- Sport: Cycling
- Current team: Retired
- Discipline: Road
- Role: Rider
- Rider type: Sprinter

Professional teams
- 1978: Intercontinentale
- 1979: Sapa
- 1980–1981: Magniflex
- 1982–1983: Atala
- 1984: Bianchi–Piaggio
- 1985–1986: Sammontana–Bianchi
- 1987–1989: Gewiss–Bianchi
- 1990: Gis Gelati–Benotto

Managerial team
- 1993–1996: Mecair–Ballan

Major wins
- Giro d'Italia, 12 stages; Vuelta a España, 1 stage; Milano–Torino (1984); Grand Prix of Aargau Canton (1989)

Paolo Rosola (born 5 February 1957) is an Italian racing cyclist.

== Major results ==
1981
1st Stage 2 Giro d'Italia
1983
Giro d'Italia

1st Stages 3, 15 & 18

1984
1st Stage 12 Giro d'Italia
1st Milano–Torino
4th Milan–San Remo
1985
1st Stage 18 Giro d'Italia
1st Stage 6b Danmark Rundt
7th Milano–Torino
1986
1st Stage 3 Tour de Suisse
1st Stage 5a Settimana Internazionale di Coppi e Bartali
1987
Giro d'Italia

1st Stages 8, 10 & 20

1st Stage 2 Vuelta a España
Coors Classic

1st Stages 5, 11, 12b & 15

1st Stage 4 Settimana Internazionale di Coppi e Bartali
1988
1st Stage 10 Giro d'Italia
1st Stage 5b Danmark Rundt
1989
1st Grand Prix of Aargau Canton
1st Stage 3 Vuelta a Andalucía
6th Wincanton Classic
