= Del Tongo (cycling team) =

Team information
- UCI code: DEL
- Registered: Italy
- Founded: 1982
- Disbanded: 1991
- Discipline: Road
- Bicycles: Colnago (1982–1988); Pinarello (1989–1991)

Team name history
- 1982 1983–1985 1986–1990 1991: Del Tongo; Del Tongo–Colnago; Del Tongo; Del Tongo–MG Boys
Del Tongo jersey
Jersey

Del Tongo (UCI team code: DEL) was an Italian professional cycling team that was active between 1982 and 1991. The team disbanded, but provided the basis for Lampre.

== History ==
The team was led primarily by two Italian sports directors: Pietro Algeri and Paolo Abetoni. They won the 1983 Giro d'Italia with Giuseppe Saronni. They only participated once in the Tour de France, in 1987. In 1992, the team stops but a new team, MG Maglificio was formed by Algeri and Abetoni along with Belgians Roger De Vlaeminck and Patrick Lefevere.

== Notable riders ==
- Giuseppe Saronni Italy
- Guido Van Calster Belgium
- Dietrich Thurau Germany
- Rolf Gölz Germany
- Gianbattista Baronchelli Italy
- Franco Chioccioli Italy
- Mario Cipollini Italy
- Maurizio Fondriest Italy
- Franco Ballerini Italy
- Fabio Baldato Italy

== Major wins ==
=== Major One-Day Races ===
- Giro di Lombardia
  - 1982 Giuseppe Saronni Italy
  - 1986 Gianbattista Baronchelli Italy
- Milan–San Remo
  - 1983 Giuseppe Saronni Italy
- Grand Prix des Amériques
  - 1990 Franco Ballerini Italy

=== Grand Tours ===
==== Giro d'Italia ====
- General classification (1983) – Giuseppe Saronni Italy
- General classification (1991) – Franco Chioccioli Italy
  - 14 stages (3 in 1982, 3 in 1983, 1 in 1984, 1 in 1985, 1 in 1989, 2 in 1990 and 3 in 1991)

==== Vuelta a España ====
- 4 stages (2 in 1983, 2 in 1984)

=== Other races ===
- 2 stages in the Tour of Germany (2 in 1982)
- General classification Tour de Suisse (1982)
  - 3 stages in the Tour de Suisse (3 in 1982)
- General classification Tirreno–Adriatico (1982)
  - 4 stages in the Tirreno–Adriatico (2 in 1982, 2 in 1987)
- 1 stage in the Tour de Romandie (in 1987)
- 1 stage in the Volta a Catalunya (in 1988)
