= 1983 Giro d'Italia =

Race details
- Dates: 12 May - 5 June 1983
- Stages: 22 + Prologue, including one split stage
- Distance: 3,922 km (2,437 mi)
- Winning time: 100h 45' 30"

Results
Jersey awarded to the overall winner	Winner	Giuseppe Saronni (ITA)	(Del Tongo-Colnago)
	Second	Roberto Visentini (ITA)	(Inoxpran)
	Third	Alberto Fernández (ESP)	(Zor)
Jersey awarded to the points classification winner	Points	Giuseppe Saronni (ITA)	(Del Tongo-Colnago)
Jersey awarded to the mountains classification winner	Mountains	Lucien Van Impe (BEL)	(Metauro Mobili-Pinarello)
Jersey awarded to the youth classification winner	Youth	Franco Chioccioli (ITA)	(Vivi-Benotto)
	Team	Zor-Gemeaz Cusin	

The 1983 Giro d'Italia was the 66th running of the Giro. It started in Brescia, on 12 May, with an 8 km (5.0 mi) prologue and concluded in Udine, on 5 June, with a 40 km (24.9 mi) individual time trial. A total of 162 riders from eighteen teams entered the 22-stage race, that was won by Italian Giuseppe Saronni of the Del Tongo-Colnago team. The second and third places were taken by Italian Roberto Visentini and Spaniard Alberto Fernández, respectively.

Amongst the other classifications that the race awarded, Saronni won the points classification, Lucien Van Impe of Metauro Mobili won the mountains classification, and Vivi-Benotto's Franco Chioccioli completed the Giro as the best neo-professional in the general classification, finishing sixteenth overall. Renault-Elf finishing as the winners of the team classification, ranking each of the twenty teams contesting the race by lowest cumulative time. The team points classification was won by Zor-Gemeaz Cusin.

== Teams ==
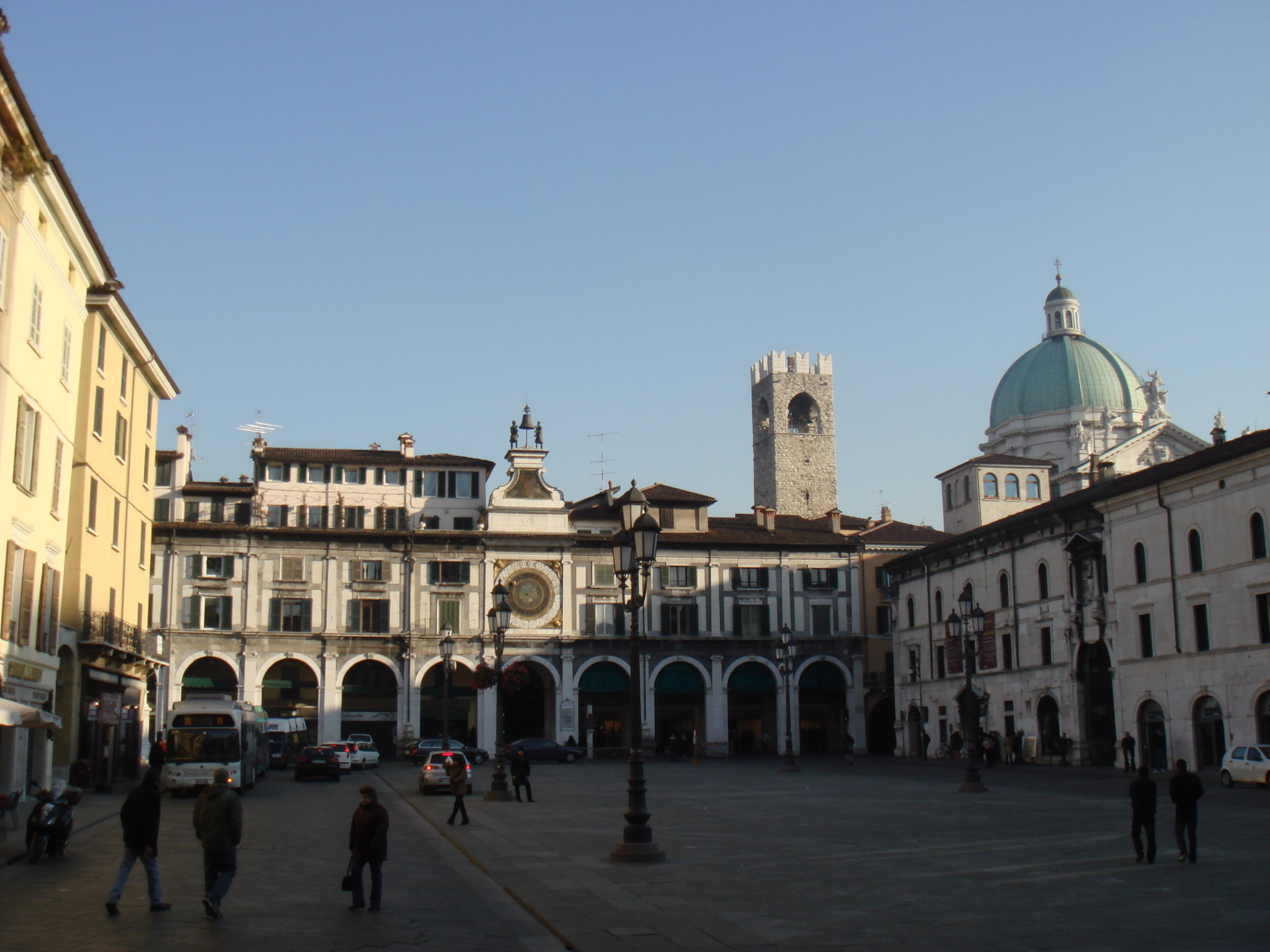
The team presentation ceremony took place on 10 May at the Piazza della Loggia in Brescia.

A total of eighteen teams were invited to participate in the 1983 Giro d'Italia. The presentation of the teams – where each team's roster and manager are introduced in front the media and local dignitaries – took place at the Piazza della Loggia in Brescia on 10 May and was televised in Italy on Network 1. The starting riders came from a total of 16 different countries; Italy (95), Belgium (22), and Spain (11) all had more than 10 riders. Each team sent a squad of nine riders, which meant that the race started with a peloton of 162 cyclists.<

Of those starting, 46 were riding the Giro d'Italia for the first time. The average age of riders was 26.42 years, ranging from 21–year–old Giuliano Pavanello (Mareno-Wilier Triestina) to 37–year–old Wladimiro Panizza (Atala-Campagnolo). The team with the youngest average rider age was Mareno-Wilier Triestina (24), while the oldest was Inoxpran-Lumenflon (28). From the riders that began this edition, 140 made it to the finish in Udine.

The teams entering the race were:

- Alfa Lum-Olmo
- Atala-Campagnolo
- Bianchi-Piaggio
- Malvor-Bottecchia
- Del Tongo-Colnago
- Dromedario-Alan
- Europ Decor-Dries
- Zor-Gemeaz Cusin
- Gis Gelati-Campagnolo
- Perlav-Euro Soap
- Inoxpran-Lumenflon
- Eorotex-Magniflex
- Mareno-Wilier Triestina
- Metauro Mobili
- Sammontana-Campagnolo
- Termolan-Galli
- Vivi-Benotto
- Wolber-Spidel

== Route and stages ==
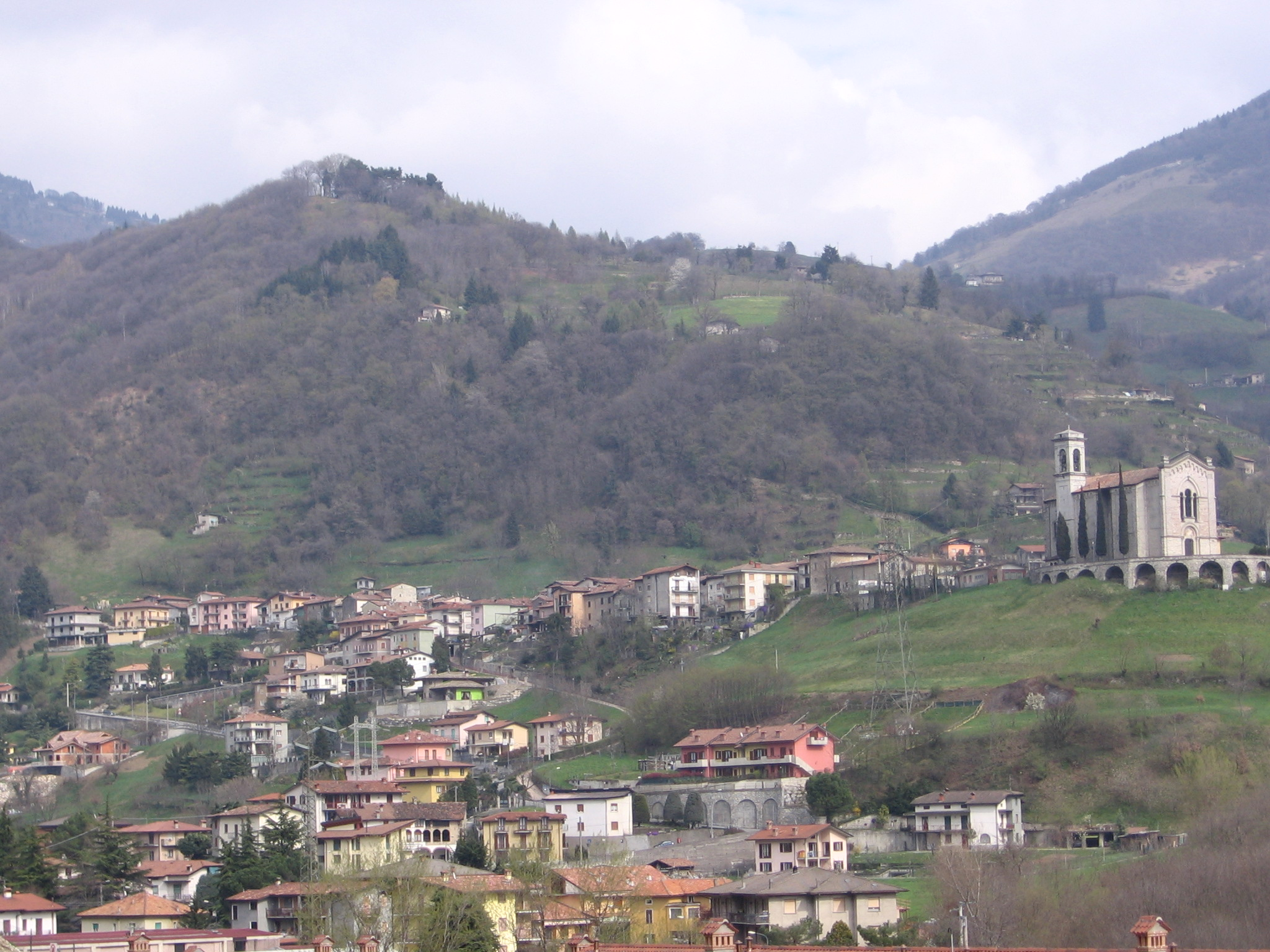
Colli di San Fermo hosted the end of the 91 km (57 mi) seventeenth stage.

The route for the 1983 edition of the Giro d'Italia was revealed to the public by head organizer Vincenzo Torriani on 19 February 1983. Covering a total of 3,922 km (2,437 mi), it included four time trials (three individual and one for teams), and fifteen stages with categorized climbs that awarded mountains classification points. Seven of these fifteen stages had summit finishes: stage 4, to Todi; stage 6, to Campitello Matese; stage 9, to Montefiascone; stage 10, to Bibbiena; stage 15, to Orta San Giulio; stage 17, to Colli di San Fermo; and stage 19, to Selva di Val Gardena. The organizers chose to include two rest days. When compared to the previous year's race, the race was 88.5 km (55 mi) shorter and contained one more time trial. In addition, this race contained one more set of split stages.

Stage characteristics and winners
Stage	Date	Course	Distance	Type	Winner
P	12 May	Brescia	~~8 km (5 mi)~~	Individual time trial	Stage Cancelled
1	13 May	Brescia to Mantua	70 km (43 mi)	Team time trial	Bianchi-Piaggio
2	14 May	Mantua to Comacchio	192 km (119 mi)	Plain stage	Guido Bontempi (ITA)
3	15 May	Comacchio to Fano	148 km (92 mi)	Plain stage	Paolo Rosola (ITA)
4	16 May	Pesaro to Todi	187 km (116 mi)	Stage with mountain(s)	Giuseppe Saronni (ITA)
5	17 May	Terni to Vasto	269 km (167 mi)	Stage with mountain(s)	Eduardo Chozas (ESP)
6	18 May	Vasto to Campitello Matese	145 km (90 mi)	Stage with mountain(s)	Alberto Fernández (ESP)
7	19 May	Campitello Matese to Salerno	216 km (134 mi)	Stage with mountain(s)	Moreno Argentin (ITA)
8	20 May	Salerno to Terracina	212 km (132 mi)	Plain stage	Guido Bontempi (ITA)
9	21 May	Terracina to Montefiascone	225 km (140 mi)	Stage with mountain(s)	Riccardo Magrini (ITA)
10	22 May	Montefiascone to Bibbiena	232 km (144 mi)	Stage with mountain(s)	Palmiro Masciarelli (ITA)
11	23 May	Bibbiena to Pietrasanta	202 km (126 mi)	Stage with mountain(s)	Lucien Van Impe (BEL)
	24 May	Rest day			
12	25 May	Pietrasanta to Reggio Emilia	180 km (112 mi)	Stage with mountain(s)	Alf Segersäll (SWE)
13	26 May	Reggio Emilia to Parma	38 km (24 mi)	Individual time trial	Giuseppe Saronni (ITA)
14	27 May	Parma to Savona	243 km (151 mi)	Stage with mountain(s)	Gregor Braun (FRG)
15	28 May	Savona to Orta San Giulio	219 km (136 mi)	Stage with mountain(s)	Paolo Rosola (ITA)
16a	29 May	Orta San Giulio to Milan	110 km (68 mi)	Plain stage	Frank Hoste (BEL)
16b	29 May	Milan to Bergamo	100 km (62 mi)	Stage with mountain(s)	Giuseppe Saronni (ITA)
17	30 May	Bergamo to Colli di San Fermo	91 km (57 mi)	Stage with mountain(s)	Alberto Fernández (ESP)
18	31 May	Sarnico to Vicenza	178 km (111 mi)	Stage with mountain(s)	Paolo Rosola (ITA)
	1 June	Rest day			
19	2 June	Vicenza to Selva di Val Gardena	224 km (139 mi)	Stage with mountain(s)	Mario Beccia (ITA)
20	3 June	Selva di Val Gardena to Arabba	169 km (105 mi)	Stage with mountain(s)	Alessandro Paganessi (ITA)
21	4 June	Arabba to Gorizia	232 km (144 mi)	Plain stage	Moreno Argentin (ITA)
22	5 June	Gorizia to Udine	40 km (25 mi)	Individual time trial	Roberto Visentini (ITA)
	Total		3,922 km (2,437 mi)		

== Classification leadership ==
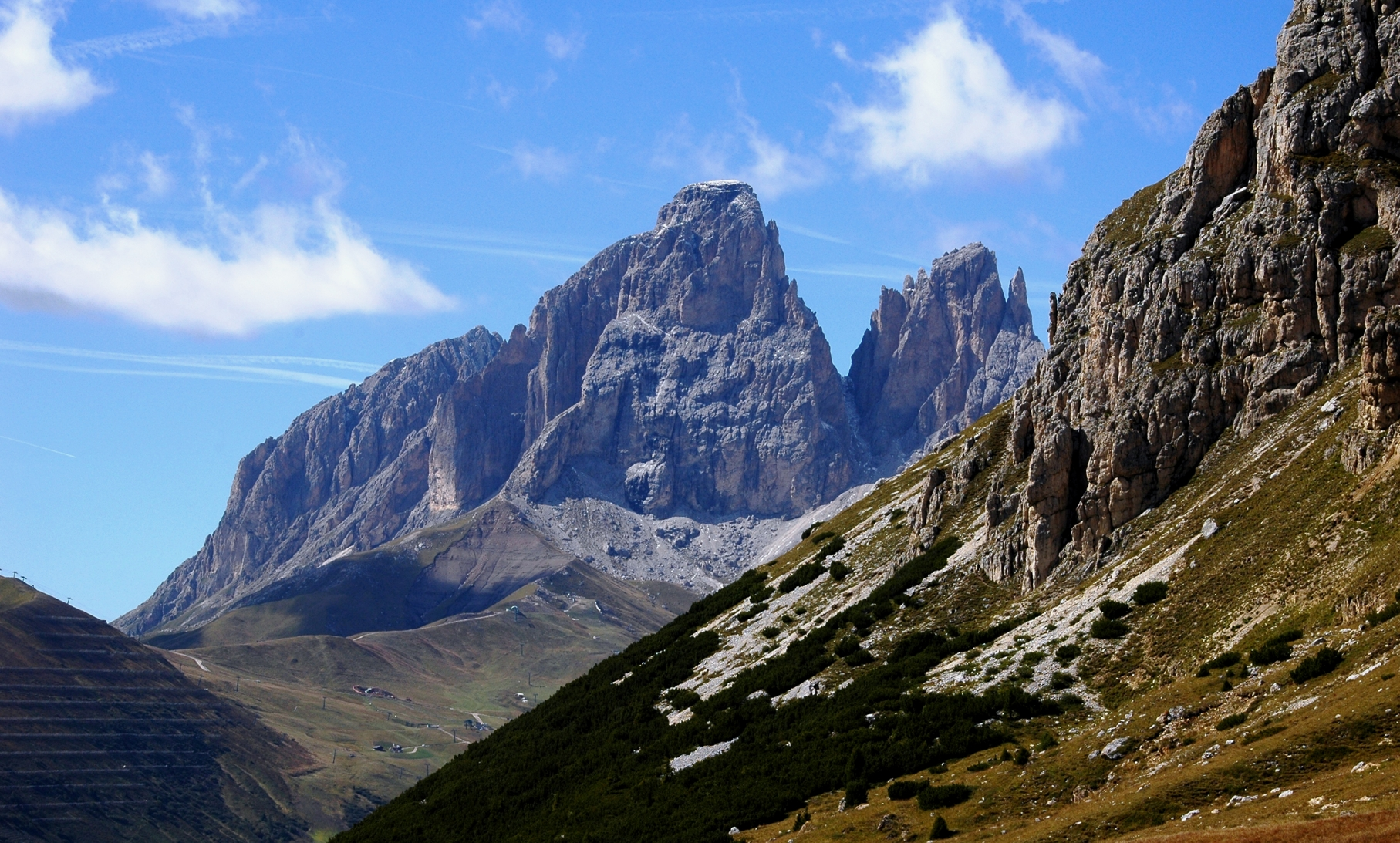
The Pordoi Pass was the Cima Coppi for the 1983 running of the Giro d'Italia.

Four different jerseys were worn during the 1983 Giro d'Italia. The leader of the general classification – calculated by adding the stage finish times of each rider, and allowing time bonuses for the first four finishers on mass-start stages – wore a pink jersey. This classification is the most important of the race, and its winner is considered as the winner of the Giro.

For the points classification, which awarded a purple (or cyclamen) jersey to its leader, cyclists were given points for finishing a stage in the top 15, no additional points were given in intermediate sprints.

The green jersey was awarded to the mountains classification leader. In this ranking, points were won by reaching the summit of a climb ahead of other cyclists. Each climb was ranked as either first, second or third category, with more points available for higher category climbs. The Cima Coppi, the race's highest point of elevation, awarded more points than the other first category climbs. The Cima Coppi for this Giro was the Pordoi Pass. The first rider to cross the Pordoi Pass was Spanish rider Marino Lejarreta.

The white jersey was worn by the leader of young rider classification, a ranking decided the same way as the general classification, but considering only neo-professional cyclists (in their first three years of professional racing).

Although no jersey was awarded, there was also one classification for the teams, in which the stage finish times of the best three cyclists per team were added; the leading team was the one with the lowest total time.

There were a few minor classifications. For example the Premio dell'Agonismo, an intermediate sprints classification, and the Fiat Uno classification (named after the Fiat Uno introduced in that year), where points were given to the riders who reached the final kilometer first.

The rows in the following table correspond to the jerseys awarded after that stage was run.

Classification leadership by stage
Stage	Winner	General classification	Points classification	Mountains classification	Young rider classification	Team classification
P	Stage Cancelled	not awarded	not awarded	not awarded	not awarded	not awarded
1	Bianchi-Piaggio	Tommy Prim	not awarded	not awarded	Valerio Piva	Bianchi-Piaggio
2	Guido Bontempi	Urs Freuler	Guido Bontempi	not awarded	Valerio Piva	Bianchi-Piaggio
3	Paolo Rosola	Paolo Rosola	Paolo Rosola	not awarded	Valerio Piva	Bianchi-Piaggio
4	Giuseppe Saronni	Paolo Rosola	Paolo Rosola	Harald Maier	Valerio Piva	Bianchi-Piaggio
5	Eduardo Chozas	Silvano Contini	Giuseppe Saronni	Lucien Van Impe	Fabrizio Verza	Bianchi-Piaggio
6	Alberto Fernández	Silvano Contini	Giuseppe Saronni	Alberto Fernández	Fabrizio Verza	Metauro Mobili-Pinarello
7	Moreno Argentin	Giuseppe Saronni	Giuseppe Saronni	Lucien Van Impe	Fabrizio Verza	Metauro Mobili-Pinarello
8	Guido Bontempi	Giuseppe Saronni	Giuseppe Saronni	Lucien Van Impe	Fabrizio Verza	Metauro Mobili-Pinarello
9	Riccardo Magrini	Giuseppe Saronni	Giuseppe Saronni	Lucien Van Impe	Fabrizio Verza	Metauro Mobili-Pinarello
10	Palmiro Masciarelli	Giuseppe Saronni	Giuseppe Saronni	Lucien Van Impe	Fabrizio Verza	Metauro Mobili-Pinarello
11	Lucien Van Impe	Giuseppe Saronni	Giuseppe Saronni	Lucien Van Impe	Fabrizio Verza	Metauro Mobili-Pinarello
12	Alf Segersäll	Giuseppe Saronni	Giuseppe Saronni	Lucien Van Impe	Fabrizio Verza	Metauro Mobili-Pinarello
13	Giuseppe Saronni	Giuseppe Saronni	Giuseppe Saronni	Lucien Van Impe	Franco Chioccioli	Metauro Mobili-Pinarello
14	Gregor Braun	Giuseppe Saronni	Giuseppe Saronni	Lucien Van Impe	Franco Chioccioli	Metauro Mobili-Pinarello
15	Paolo Rosola	Giuseppe Saronni	Giuseppe Saronni	Lucien Van Impe	Franco Chioccioli	Metauro Mobili-Pinarello
16a	Frank Hoste	Giuseppe Saronni	Giuseppe Saronni	Lucien Van Impe	Franco Chioccioli	Metauro Mobili-Pinarello
16b	Giuseppe Saronni	Giuseppe Saronni	Giuseppe Saronni	Lucien Van Impe	Franco Chioccioli	Metauro Mobili-Pinarello
17	Alberto Fernández	Giuseppe Saronni	Giuseppe Saronni	Lucien Van Impe	Franco Chioccioli	Zor-Gemeaz Cusin
18	Paolo Rosola	Giuseppe Saronni	Giuseppe Saronni	Lucien Van Impe	Franco Chioccioli	Zor-Gemeaz Cusin
19	Mario Beccia	Giuseppe Saronni	Giuseppe Saronni	Lucien Van Impe	Franco Chioccioli	Zor-Gemeaz Cusin
20	Alessandro Paganessi	Giuseppe Saronni	Giuseppe Saronni	Lucien Van Impe	Franco Chioccioli	Zor-Gemeaz Cusin
21	Moreno Argentin	Giuseppe Saronni	Giuseppe Saronni	Lucien Van Impe	Franco Chioccioli	Zor-Gemeaz Cusin
22	Roberto Visentini	Giuseppe Saronni	Giuseppe Saronni	Lucien Van Impe	Franco Chioccioli	Zor-Gemeaz Cusin
Final		Giuseppe Saronni	Giuseppe Saronni	Lucien Van Impe	Franco Chioccioli	Zor-Gemeaz Cusin

== Final standings ==
Legend
Pink jersey	Denotes the winner of the General classification
Green jersey	Denotes the winner of the Mountains classification
Purple jersey	Denotes the winner of the Points classification
White jersey	Denotes the winner of the Young rider classification

=== General classification ===
Final general classification (1–10)
Rank	Name	Team	Time
1	Giuseppe Saronni (ITA)	Del Tongo-Colnago	100h 45' 30"
2	Roberto Visentini (ITA)	Inoxpran-Lumenflon	+ 1' 07"
3	Alberto Fernández (ESP)	Zor-Gemeaz Cusin	+ 3' 40"
4	Mario Beccia (ITA)	Malvor-Bottecchia	+ 5' 55"
5	Dietrich Thurau (FRG)	Del Tongo-Colnago	+ 7' 44"
6	Marino Lejarreta (ESP)	Alfa Lum-Olmo	+ 7' 47"
7	Faustino Rupérez Rincón (ESP)	Zor-Gemeaz Cusin	+ 8' 24"
8	Eduardo Chozas Olmo (ESP)	Zor-Gemeaz Cusin	+ 9' 41"
9	Lucien Van Impe (BEL)	Metauro Mobili	+ 10' 54"
10	Wladimiro Panizza (ITA)	Atala-Campagnolo	+ 12' 00"

=== Points classification ===
Final points classification (1-5)
	Rider	Team	Points
1	Giuseppe Saronni (ITA)	Del Tongo-Colnago	223
2	Moreno Argentin (ITA)	Sammontana	149
3	Frank Hoste (BEL)	Europ Decor-Dries	139
4	Pierino Gavazzi (ITA)	Atala-Campagnolo	120
5	Stefan Mutter (SUI)	Eorotex-Magniflex	111

=== Mountains classification ===
Final mountains classification (1-5)
	Rider	Team	Points
1	Lucien Van Impe (BEL)	Metauro Mobili	70
2	Alberto Fernández (ESP)	Zor-Gemeaz Cusin	43
3	Marino Lejarreta (ESP)	Alfa Lum-Olmo	27
3	Faustino Rupérez (ESP)	Zor-Gemeaz Cusin	27
5	Alessandro Paganessi (ITA)	Bianchi-Piaggio	23

=== Young rider classification ===
Final young rider classification (1-5)
	Rider	Team	Time
1	Franco Chioccioli (ITA)	Vivi-Benotto	101h 00" 52"
2	Fabrizio Verza (ITA)	Gis Gelati-Campagnolo	+ 12' 16"
3	Harald Maier (AUT)	Eorotex-Magniflex	+ 20' 32"
4	Davide Cassani (ITA)	Termolan-Galli	+ 30' 27"
5	Czesław Lang (POL)	Gis Gelati-Campagnolo	+ 35' 13"

=== Team classification ===
Final team classification (1-3)
	Team	Time
1	Zor-Gemeaz Cusin	300h 05' 39"
2	Inoxpran-Lumenflon	+ 10' 45"
3	Del Tongo-Colnago	+ 17' 30"
