= 1982 Tour de France, Stage 11 to Stage 21 =

Cycling race stages

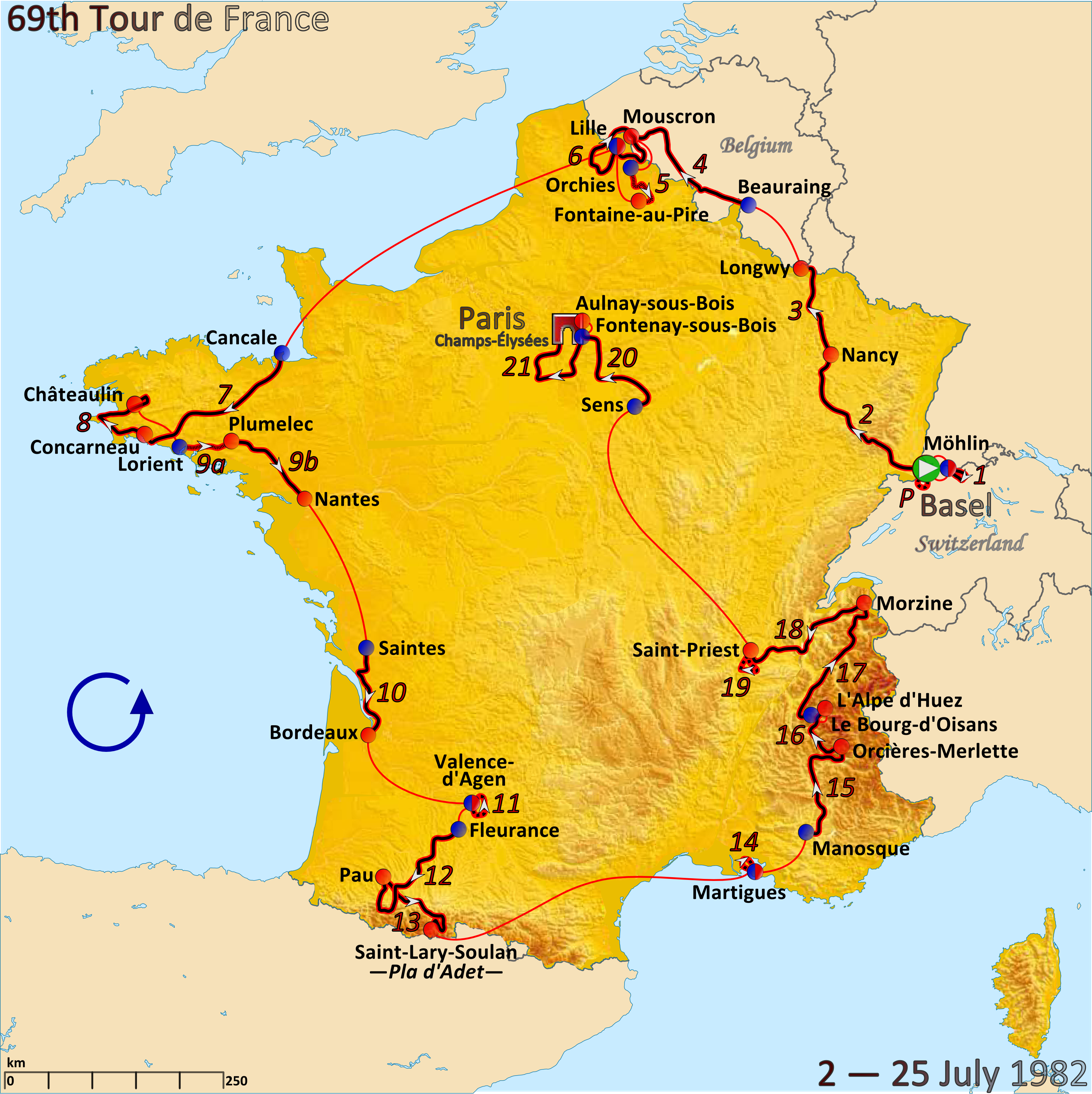
Route of the 1982 Tour de France

The 1982 Tour de France was the 69th edition of Tour de France, one of cycling's Grand Tours. The Tour began in Basel, Switzerland with a prologue individual time trial on 2 July and Stage 11 occurred on 14 July with an individual time trial from Valence d'Agen. The race finished on the Champs-Élysées in Paris on 25 July.

== Stage 11 ==
14 July 1982 — Valence d'Agen, 57.3 km (35.6 mi) (ITT)

Stage 11 result

Rank	Rider	Team	Time
1	Gerrie Knetemann (NED)	TI–Raleigh–Campagnolo–Merckx	1h 17' 29"
2	Bernard Hinault (FRA)	Renault–Elf–Gitane	+ 18"
3	Daniel Willems (BEL)	Sunair–Colnago–Campagnolo	+ 1' 36"
4	Jan van Houwelingen (NED)	Vermeer–Thijs–Gios	+ 2' 29"
5	Joop Zoetemelk (NED)	Coop–Mercier–Mavic	s.t.
6	Dietrich Thurau (FRG)	Hoonved–Botecchia	+ 2' 36"
7	Régis Clère (FRA)	Coop–Mercier–Mavic	+ 2' 45"
8	Daniel Gisiger (SUI)	Hoonved–Botecchia	+ 2' 56"
9	Alberto Fernández (ESP)	Teka	+ 3' 02"
10	Fons De Wolf (BEL)	Vermeer–Thijs–Gios	+ 3' 03"

General classification after stage 11

Rank	Rider	Team	Time
1	Bernard Hinault (FRA)	Renault–Elf–Gitane	45h 53' 32"
2	Gerrie Knetemann (NED)	TI–Raleigh–Campagnolo–Merckx	+ 14"
3	Phil Anderson (AUS)	Peugeot–Shell–Michelin	+ 2' 03"
4	Daniel Willems (BEL)	Sunair–Colnago–Campagnolo	+ 2' 31"
5	Ludo Peeters (BEL)	TI–Raleigh–Campagnolo–Merckx	+ 3' 38"
6	Régis Clère (FRA)	Coop–Mercier–Mavic	+ 4' 20"
7	Joop Zoetemelk (NED)	Coop–Mercier–Mavic	+ 4' 26"
8	Bernard Vallet (FRA)	La Redoute–Motobécane	+ 5' 43"
9	Sean Kelly (IRL)	SEM–France Loire–Campagnolo	+ 6' 10"
10	Johan van der Velde (NED)	TI–Raleigh–Campagnolo–Merckx	+ 6' 34"

== Stage 12 ==
15 July 1982 — Fleurance to Pau, 249 km (154.7 mi)

Stage 12 result

Rank	Rider	Team	Time
1	Sean Kelly (IRL)	SEM–France Loire–Campagnolo	6h 55' 47"
2	Phil Anderson (AUS)	Peugeot–Shell–Michelin	s.t.
3	Johan van der Velde (NED)	TI–Raleigh–Campagnolo–Merckx	s.t.
4	Guy Nulens (BEL)	DAF Trucks–Tévé Blad–Rossin	s.t.
5	Bernard Vallet (FRA)	La Redoute–Motobécane	s.t.
6	Marino Lejarreta (ESP)	Teka	s.t.
7	Peter Winnen (NED)	Capri Sonne–Campagnolo–Merckx	s.t.
8	Mario Beccia (ITA)	Hoonved–Botecchia	s.t.
9	Robert Alban (FRA)	La Redoute–Motobécane	s.t.
10	Jostein Wilmann (NOR)	Capri Sonne–Campagnolo–Merckx	s.t.

General classification after stage 12

Rank	Rider	Team	Time
1	Bernard Hinault (FRA)	Renault–Elf–Gitane	52h 49' 19"
2	Phil Anderson (AUS)	Peugeot–Shell–Michelin	+ 2' 03"
3	Joop Zoetemelk (NED)	Coop–Mercier–Mavic	+ 4' 26"
4	Bernard Vallet (FRA)	La Redoute–Motobécane	+ 5' 43"
5	Sean Kelly (IRL)	SEM–France Loire–Campagnolo	+ 6' 10"
6	Daniel Willems (BEL)	Sunair–Colnago–Campagnolo	+ 6' 24"
7	Johan van der Velde (NED)	TI–Raleigh–Campagnolo–Merckx	+ 6' 34"
8	Jostein Wilmann (NOR)	Capri Sonne–Campagnolo–Merckx	+ 7' 24"
9	Hennie Kuiper (NED)	DAF Trucks–Tévé Blad–Rossin	+ 7' 26"
10	Ludo Peeters (BEL)	TI–Raleigh–Campagnolo–Merckx	+ 7' 31"

== Stage 13 ==
16 July 1982 — Pau to Saint-Lary-Soulan Pla d'Adet, 121 km (75.2 mi)

Stage 13 result

Rank	Rider	Team	Time
1	Beat Breu (SUI)	Cilo–Aufina	3h 40' 27"
2	Robert Alban (FRA)	La Redoute–Motobécane	+ 35"
3	Alberto Fernández (ESP)	Teka	+ 40"
4	Bernard Vallet (FRA)	La Redoute–Motobécane	+ 51"
5	Raymond Martin (FRA)	Coop–Mercier–Mavic	+ 52"
6	Bernard Hinault (FRA)	Renault–Elf–Gitane	+ 54"
7	Joop Zoetemelk (NED)	Coop–Mercier–Mavic	+ 59"
8	Marc Madiot (FRA)	Renault–Elf–Gitane	+ 1' 45"
9	Johan van der Velde (NED)	TI–Raleigh–Campagnolo–Merckx	+ 1' 46"
10	Peter Winnen (NED)	Capri Sonne–Campagnolo–Merckx	s.t.

General classification after stage 13

Rank	Rider	Team	Time
1	Bernard Hinault (FRA)	Renault–Elf–Gitane	56h 30' 40"
2	Phil Anderson (AUS)	Peugeot–Shell–Michelin	+ 3' 12"
3	Joop Zoetemelk (NED)	Coop–Mercier–Mavic	+ 4' 31"
4	Bernard Vallet (FRA)	La Redoute–Motobécane	+ 5' 40"
5	Johan van der Velde (NED)	TI–Raleigh–Campagnolo–Merckx	+ 7' 26"
6	Jostein Wilmann (NOR)	Capri Sonne–Campagnolo–Merckx	+ 8' 18"
7	Beat Breu (SUI)	Cilo–Aufina	+ 8' 35"
8	Hennie Kuiper (NED)	DAF Trucks–Tévé Blad–Rossin	+ 8' 55"
9	Peter Winnen (NED)	Capri Sonne–Campagnolo–Merckx	+ 9' 13"
10	Raymond Martin (FRA)	Coop–Mercier–Mavic	+ 9' 43"

== Stage 14 ==
18 July 1982 — Martigues, 32.5 km (20.2 mi) (ITT)

Stage 14 result

Rank	Rider	Team	Time
1	Bernard Hinault (FRA)	Renault–Elf–Gitane	45' 12"
2	Jan van Houwelingen (NED)	Vermeer–Thijs–Gios	+ 49"
3	Daniel Gisiger (SUI)	Hoonved–Botecchia	+ 53"
4	Joop Zoetemelk (NED)	Coop–Mercier–Mavic	+ 55"
5	Bernard Vallet (FRA)	La Redoute–Motobécane	+ 59"
6	Gerrie Knetemann (NED)	TI–Raleigh–Campagnolo–Merckx	+ 1' 10"
7	Johan De Muynck (BEL)	La Redoute–Motobécane	+ 1' 11"
8	Alberto Fernández (ESP)	Teka	+ 1' 13"
9	Gery Verlinden (BEL)	Sunair–Colnago–Campagnolo	+ 1' 15"
10	Fons De Wolf (BEL)	Vermeer–Thijs–Gios	+ 1' 21"

General classification after stage 14

Rank	Rider	Team	Time
1	Bernard Hinault (FRA)	Renault–Elf–Gitane	57h 15' 52"
2	Phil Anderson (AUS)	Peugeot–Shell–Michelin	+ 5' 17"
3	Joop Zoetemelk (NED)	Coop–Mercier–Mavic	+ 5' 26"
4	Bernard Vallet (FRA)	La Redoute–Motobécane	+ 6' 39"
5	Johan van der Velde (NED)	TI–Raleigh–Campagnolo–Merckx	+ 9' 36"
6	Hennie Kuiper (NED)	DAF Trucks–Tévé Blad–Rossin	+ 10' 36"
7	Jostein Wilmann (NOR)	Capri Sonne–Campagnolo–Merckx	+ 10' 49"
8	Peter Winnen (NED)	Capri Sonne–Campagnolo–Merckx	+ 11' 00"
9	Daniel Willems (BEL)	Sunair–Colnago–Campagnolo	+ 11' 27"
10	Beat Breu (SUI)	Cilo–Aufina	+ 12' 01"

== Stage 15 ==
19 July 1982 — Manosque to Orcières-Merlette, 204 km (127 mi)

Stage 15 result

Rank	Rider	Team	Time
1	Pascal Simon (FRA)	Peugeot–Shell–Michelin	6h 34' 41"
2	Pierre-Henri Menthéour (FRA)	Coop–Mercier–Mavic	+ 9"
3	Jean-René Bernaudeau (FRA)	Peugeot–Shell–Michelin	+ 1' 21"
4	Mario Beccia (ITA)	Hoonved–Botecchia	+ 1' 35"
5	Christian Seznec (FRA)	Wolber-Spidel	+ 1' 38"
6	Robert Alban (FRA)	La Redoute–Motobécane	+ 1' 42"
7	Peter Winnen (NED)	Capri Sonne–Campagnolo–Merckx	+ 1' 47"
8	Beat Breu (SUI)	Cilo–Aufina	+ 1' 48"
9	Alberto Fernández (ESP)	Teka	+ 1' 49"
10	Raymond Martin (FRA)	Coop–Mercier–Mavic	+ 2' 57"

General classification after stage 15

Rank	Rider	Team	Time
1	Bernard Hinault (FRA)	Renault–Elf–Gitane	63h 53' 40"
2	Joop Zoetemelk (NED)	Coop–Mercier–Mavic	+ 5' 26"
3	Phil Anderson (AUS)	Peugeot–Shell–Michelin	+ 7' 57"
4	Bernard Vallet (FRA)	La Redoute–Motobécane	+ 9' 19"
5	Johan van der Velde (NED)	TI–Raleigh–Campagnolo–Merckx	+ 9' 27"
6	Peter Winnen (NED)	Capri Sonne–Campagnolo–Merckx	+ 9' 40"
7	Hennie Kuiper (NED)	DAF Trucks–Tévé Blad–Rossin	+ 10' 36"
8	Beat Breu (SUI)	Cilo–Aufina	+ 10' 42"
9	Daniel Willems (BEL)	Sunair–Colnago–Campagnolo	+ 12' 12"
10	Jostein Wilmann (NOR)	Capri Sonne–Campagnolo–Merckx	+ 12' 51"

== Stage 16 ==
20 July 1982 — Orcières-Merlette to Alpe d'Huez, 121 km (75 mi)

Stage 16 result

Rank	Rider	Team	Time
1	Beat Breu (SUI)	Cilo–Aufina	3h 24' 22"
2	Robert Alban (FRA)	La Redoute–Motobécane	+ 16"
3	Alberto Fernández (ESP)	Teka	+ 1' 18"
4	Raymond Martin (FRA)	Coop–Mercier–Mavic	+ 1' 22"
5	Bernard Hinault (FRA)	Renault–Elf–Gitane	+ 1' 26"
6	Joop Zoetemelk (NED)	Coop–Mercier–Mavic	s.t.
7	Peter Winnen (NED)	Capri Sonne–Campagnolo–Merckx	s.t.
8	Bernard Vallet (FRA)	La Redoute–Motobécane	+ 2' 12"
9	Johan van der Velde (NED)	TI–Raleigh–Campagnolo–Merckx	s.t.
10	Paul Wellens (BEL)	Wickes–Bouwmarkt–Splendor	+ 2' 51"

General classification after stage 16

Rank	Rider	Team	Time
1	Bernard Hinault (FRA)	Renault–Elf–Gitane	67h 19' 28"
2	Joop Zoetemelk (NED)	Coop–Mercier–Mavic	+ 5' 26"
3	Beat Breu (SUI)	Cilo–Aufina	+ 9' 16"
4	Peter Winnen (NED)	Capri Sonne–Campagnolo–Merckx	+ 9' 40"
5	Bernard Vallet (FRA)	La Redoute–Motobécane	+ 10' 05"
6	Johan van der Velde (NED)	TI–Raleigh–Campagnolo–Merckx	+ 10' 13"
7	Phil Anderson (AUS)	Peugeot–Shell–Michelin	s.t.
8	Raymond Martin (FRA)	Coop–Mercier–Mavic	+ 12' 50"
9	Hennie Kuiper (NED)	DAF Trucks–Tévé Blad–Rossin	+ 12' 57"
10	Robert Alban (FRA)	La Redoute–Motobécane	+ 13' 13"

== Stage 17 ==
21 July 1982 — Le Bourg-d'Oisans to Morzine, 244 km (152 mi)

Stage 17 result

Rank	Rider	Team	Time
1	Peter Winnen (NED)	Capri Sonne–Campagnolo–Merckx	7h 34' 20"
2	Johan van der Velde (NED)	TI–Raleigh–Campagnolo–Merckx	+ 32"
3	Jean-René Bernaudeau (FRA)	Peugeot–Shell–Michelin	+ 1' 24"
4	Robert Alban (FRA)	La Redoute–Motobécane	+ 1' 51"
5	Sven-Åke Nilsson (SWE)	Wolber-Spidel	+ 1' 53"
6	Bernard Hinault (FRA)	Renault–Elf–Gitane	+ 2' 27"
7	Phil Anderson (AUS)	Peugeot–Shell–Michelin	s.t.
8	Joop Zoetemelk (NED)	Coop–Mercier–Mavic	+ 2' 28"
9	Alberto Fernández (ESP)	Teka	s.t.
10	Raymond Martin (FRA)	Coop–Mercier–Mavic	s.t.

General classification after stage 17

Rank	Rider	Team	Time
1	Bernard Hinault (FRA)	Renault–Elf–Gitane	74h 56' 15"
2	Joop Zoetemelk (NED)	Coop–Mercier–Mavic	+ 5' 27"
3	Peter Winnen (NED)	Capri Sonne–Campagnolo–Merckx	+ 7' 13"
4	Johan van der Velde (NED)	TI–Raleigh–Campagnolo–Merckx	+ 8' 18"
5	Beat Breu (SUI)	Cilo–Aufina	+ 9' 17"
6	Phil Anderson (AUS)	Peugeot–Shell–Michelin	+ 10' 13"
7	Robert Alban (FRA)	La Redoute–Motobécane	+ 12' 37"
8	Raymond Martin (FRA)	Coop–Mercier–Mavic	+ 12' 51"
9	Hennie Kuiper (NED)	DAF Trucks–Tévé Blad–Rossin	+ 14' 30"
10	Alberto Fernández (ESP)	Teka	+ 15' 30"

== Stage 18 ==
22 July 1982 — Morzine to Saint-Priest, 230 km (140 mi)

Stage 18 result

Rank	Rider	Team	Time
1	Adri van Houwelingen (NED)	Vermeer–Thijs–Gios	6h 32' 51"
2	Sean Kelly (IRL)	SEM–France Loire–Campagnolo	+ 10' 31"
3	Leo van Vliet (NED)	TI–Raleigh–Campagnolo–Merckx	s.t.
4	Stefan Mutter (SUI)	Puch–Eurotex–Campagnolo	s.t.
5	Eric McKenzie (NZL)	Capri Sonne–Campagnolo–Merckx	s.t.
6	Johan van der Velde (NED)	TI–Raleigh–Campagnolo–Merckx	s.t.
7	Ludo Peeters (BEL)	TI–Raleigh–Campagnolo–Merckx	s.t.
8	Fons De Wolf (BEL)	Vermeer–Thijs–Gios	s.t.
9	Adri van der Poel (NED)	DAF Trucks–Tévé Blad–Rossin	s.t.
10	Ludwig Wijnants (BEL)	Sunair–Colnago–Campagnolo	s.t.

General classification after stage 18

Rank	Rider	Team	Time
1	Bernard Hinault (FRA)	Renault–Elf–Gitane	81h 39' 49"
2	Joop Zoetemelk (NED)	Coop–Mercier–Mavic	+ 5' 27"
3	Peter Winnen (NED)	Capri Sonne–Campagnolo–Merckx	+ 7' 13"
4	Johan van der Velde (NED)	TI–Raleigh–Campagnolo–Merckx	+ 8' 06"
5	Beat Breu (SUI)	Cilo–Aufina	+ 9' 05"
6	Phil Anderson (AUS)	Peugeot–Shell–Michelin	+ 10' 01"
7	Robert Alban (FRA)	La Redoute–Motobécane	+ 12' 25"
8	Raymond Martin (FRA)	Coop–Mercier–Mavic	+ 12' 39"
9	Hennie Kuiper (NED)	DAF Trucks–Tévé Blad–Rossin	+ 14' 18"
10	Alberto Fernández (ESP)	Teka	+ 15' 18"

== Stage 19 ==
23 July 1982 — Saint-Priest, 48 km (30 mi) (ITT)

Stage 19 result

Rank	Rider	Team	Time
1	Bernard Hinault (FRA)	Renault–Elf–Gitane	1h 04' 29"
2	Gerrie Knetemann (NED)	TI–Raleigh–Campagnolo–Merckx	+ 9"
3	Pascal Poisson (FRA)	Renault–Elf–Gitane	+ 19"
4	Daniel Willems (BEL)	Sunair–Colnago–Campagnolo	+ 34"
5	Régis Clère (FRA)	Coop–Mercier–Mavic	+ 47"
6	Joop Zoetemelk (NED)	Coop–Mercier–Mavic	+ 54"
7	Johan van der Velde (NED)	TI–Raleigh–Campagnolo–Merckx	+ 1' 13"
8	Sean Kelly (IRL)	SEM–France Loire–Campagnolo	+ 1' 39"
9	Serge Demierre (SUI)	Cilo–Aufina	+ 1' 44"
10	Alberto Fernández (ESP)	Teka	+ 1' 51"

General classification after stage 19

Rank	Rider	Team	Time
1	Bernard Hinault (FRA)	Renault–Elf–Gitane	82h 44' 18"
2	Joop Zoetemelk (NED)	Coop–Mercier–Mavic	+ 6' 21"
3	Johan van der Velde (NED)	TI–Raleigh–Campagnolo–Merckx	+ 9' 19"
4	Peter Winnen (NED)	Capri Sonne–Campagnolo–Merckx	+ 9' 24"
5	Phil Anderson (AUS)	Peugeot–Shell–Michelin	+ 12' 16"
6	Beat Breu (SUI)	Cilo–Aufina	+ 13' 21"
7	Raymond Martin (FRA)	Coop–Mercier–Mavic	+ 15' 35"
8	Alberto Fernández (ESP)	Teka	+ 11' 00"
9	Robert Alban (FRA)	La Redoute–Motobécane	+ 11' 27"
10	Daniel Willems (BEL)	Sunair–Colnago–Campagnolo	+ 12' 01"

== Stage 20 ==
24 July 1982 — Sens to Aulnay-sous-Bois, 159 km (99 mi)

Stage 20 result

Rank	Rider	Team	Time
1	Daniel Willems (BEL)	Sunair–Colnago–Campagnolo	4h 22' 21"
2	Sean Kelly (IRL)	SEM–France Loire–Campagnolo	s.t.
3	Didier Vanoverschelde (FRA)	La Redoute–Motobécane	s.t.
4	Dirk Wayenberg (BEL)	Capri Sonne–Campagnolo–Merckx	s.t.
5	Jean-Louis Gauthier (FRA)	Coop–Mercier–Mavic	s.t.
6	Hennie Kuiper (NED)	DAF Trucks–Tévé Blad–Rossin	s.t.
7	Marcel Tinazzi (FRA)	SEM–France Loire–Campagnolo	+ 14"
8	Gilbert Glaus (SUI)	Cilo–Aufina	+ 43"
9	Leo van Vliet (NED)	TI–Raleigh–Campagnolo–Merckx	s.t.
10	Ad Wijnands (NED)	TI–Raleigh–Campagnolo–Merckx	s.t.

General classification after stage 20

Rank	Rider	Team	Time
1	Bernard Hinault (FRA)	Renault–Elf–Gitane	87h 07' 22"
2	Joop Zoetemelk (NED)	Coop–Mercier–Mavic	+ 6' 21"
3	Johan van der Velde (NED)	TI–Raleigh–Campagnolo–Merckx	+ 8' 59"
4	Peter Winnen (NED)	Capri Sonne–Campagnolo–Merckx	+ 9' 24"
5	Phil Anderson (AUS)	Peugeot–Shell–Michelin	+ 12' 16"
6	Beat Breu (SUI)	Cilo–Aufina	+ 13' 21"
7	Daniel Willems (BEL)	Sunair–Colnago–Campagnolo	+ 15' 33"
8	Raymond Martin (FRA)	Coop–Mercier–Mavic	+ 15' 35"
9	Hennie Kuiper (NED)	DAF Trucks–Tévé Blad–Rossin	+ 17' 01"
10	Alberto Fernández (ESP)	Teka	+ 17' 09"

== Stage 21 ==
25 July 1982 — Fontenay-sous-Bois to Paris Champs-Élysées, 186.8 km (116.1 mi)

Stage 21 result

Rank	Rider	Team	Time
1	Bernard Hinault (FRA)	Renault–Elf–Gitane	5h 01' 24"
2	Adri van der Poel (NED)	DAF Trucks–Tévé Blad–Rossin	s.t.
3	Yvon Bertin (FRA)	Coop–Mercier–Mavic	s.t.
4	Rudy Pevenage (BEL)	Capri Sonne–Campagnolo–Merckx	s.t.
5	Fons De Wolf (BEL)	Vermeer–Thijs–Gios	s.t.
6	Mike Gutmann (SUI)	Puch–Eurotex–Campagnolo	s.t.
7	Eric McKenzie (NZL)	Capri Sonne–Campagnolo–Merckx	s.t.
8	Paul Sherwen (GBR)	La Redoute–Motobécane	s.t.
9	Stefan Mutter (SUI)	Puch–Eurotex–Campagnolo	s.t.
10	Marc Gomez (FRA)	Wolber-Spidel	s.t.

General classification after stage 21

Rank	Rider	Team	Time
1	Bernard Hinault (FRA)	Renault–Elf–Gitane	92h 08' 46"
2	Joop Zoetemelk (NED)	Coop–Mercier–Mavic	+ 6' 21"
3	Johan van der Velde (NED)	TI–Raleigh–Campagnolo–Merckx	+ 8' 59"
4	Peter Winnen (NED)	Capri Sonne–Campagnolo–Merckx	+ 9' 24"
5	Phil Anderson (AUS)	Peugeot–Shell–Michelin	+ 12' 16"
6	Beat Breu (SUI)	Cilo–Aufina	+ 13' 21"
7	Daniel Willems (BEL)	Sunair–Colnago–Campagnolo	+ 15' 33"
8	Raymond Martin (FRA)	Coop–Mercier–Mavic	+ 15' 35"
9	Hennie Kuiper (NED)	DAF Trucks–Tévé Blad–Rossin	+ 17' 01"
10	Alberto Fernández (ESP)	Teka	+ 17' 09"
