= 1982 Tour de France, Prologue to Stage 10 =

Cycling race stages

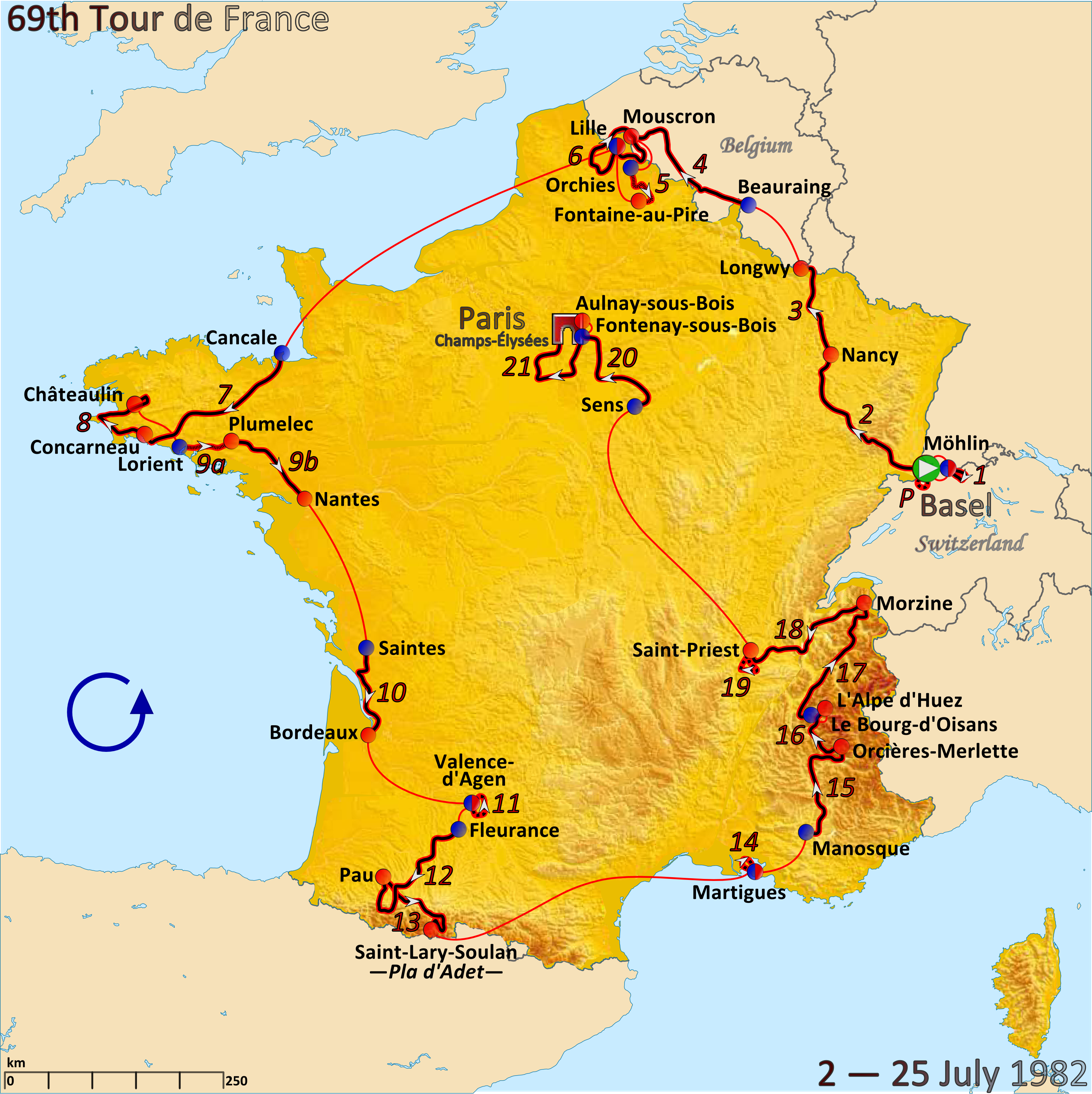
Route of the 1982 Tour de France

The 1982 Tour de France was the 69th edition of Tour de France, one of cycling's Grand Tours. The Tour began in Basel, Switzerland with a prologue individual time trial on 2 July and Stage 10 occurred on 13 July with a flat stage to Bordeaux. The race finished on the Champs-Élysées in Paris on 25 July.

== Prologue ==
2 July 1982 — Basel (Switzerland), 7.4 km (4.6 mi) (ITT)

Prologue result and general classification after prologue

Rank	Rider	Team	Time
1	Bernard Hinault (FRA)	Renault–Elf–Gitane	9' 31"
2	Gerrie Knetemann (NED)	TI–Raleigh–Campagnolo–Merckx	+ 7"
3	Gregor Braun (FRG)	Capri Sonne–Campagnolo–Merckx	+ 11"
4	Phil Anderson (AUS)	Peugeot–Shell–Michelin	+ 13"
5	Régis Clère (FRA)	Coop–Mercier–Mavic	s.t.
6	Bernard Vallet (FRA)	La Redoute–Motobécane	+ 14"
7	Daniel Gisiger (SUI)	Hoonved–Botecchia	+ 16"
8	Bert Oosterbosch (NED)	DAF Trucks–Tévé Blad–Rossin	+ 19"
9	Joop Zoetemelk (NED)	Coop–Mercier–Mavic	+ 20"
10	Patrick Bonnet (FRA)	Renault–Elf–Gitane	+ 21"

== Stage 1 ==
3 July 1982 — Basel (Switzerland) to Möhlin (Switzerland), 207 km (128.6 mi)

Stage 1 result

Rank	Rider	Team	Time
1	Ludo Peeters (BEL)	TI–Raleigh–Campagnolo–Merckx	5h 20' 23"
2	Sean Kelly (IRL)	SEM–France Loire–Campagnolo	+ 38"
3	Jan Raas (NED)	TI–Raleigh–Campagnolo–Merckx	s.t.
4	Eddy Planckaert (BEL)	Wickes–Bouwmarkt–Splendor	s.t.
5	Leo van Vliet (NED)	TI–Raleigh–Campagnolo–Merckx	s.t.
6	Rudy Pevenage (BEL)	Capri Sonne–Campagnolo–Merckx	s.t.
7	Stefan Mutter (SUI)	Puch–Eurotex–Campagnolo	s.t.
8	Pol Verschuere (BEL)	Vermeer–Thijs–Gios	s.t.
9	Jean-François Rault (FRA)	Wolber-Spidel	s.t.
10	Johan van der Velde (NED)	TI–Raleigh–Campagnolo–Merckx	s.t.

General classification after stage 1

Rank	Rider	Team	Time
1	Ludo Peeters (BEL)	TI–Raleigh–Campagnolo–Merckx	5h 30' 18"
2	Bernard Hinault (FRA)	Renault–Elf–Gitane	+ 14"
3	Gerrie Knetemann (NED)	TI–Raleigh–Campagnolo–Merckx	+ 21"
4	Gregor Braun (FRG)	Capri Sonne–Campagnolo–Merckx	+ 25"
5	Phil Anderson (AUS)	Peugeot–Shell–Michelin	+ 27"
6	Régis Clère (FRA)	Coop–Mercier–Mavic	s.t.
7	Bernard Vallet (FRA)	La Redoute–Motobécane	+ 28"
8	Daniel Gisiger (SUI)	Hoonved–Botecchia	+ 30"
9	Joop Zoetemelk (NED)	Coop–Mercier–Mavic	+ 34"
10	Patrick Bonnet (FRA)	Renault–Elf–Gitane	+ 35"

== Stage 2 ==
4 July 1982 — Basel (Switzerland) to Nancy, 246 km (152.9 mi)

Stage 2 result

Rank	Rider	Team	Time
1	Phil Anderson (AUS)	Peugeot–Shell–Michelin	6h 31' 33"
2	Henk Lubberding (NED)	TI–Raleigh–Campagnolo–Merckx	+ 4"
3	Bernard Vallet (FRA)	La Redoute–Motobécane	+ 9"
4	Marc Madiot (FRA)	Renault–Elf–Gitane	+ 10"
5	Peter Winnen (NED)	Capri Sonne–Campagnolo–Merckx	+ 20"
6	Michel Laurent (FRA)	Peugeot–Shell–Michelin	+ 21"
7	Sean Kelly (IRL)	SEM–France Loire–Campagnolo	+ 29"
8	Pierre-Raymond Villemiane (FRA)	Wolber-Spidel	s.t.
9	Gerrie Knetemann (NED)	TI–Raleigh–Campagnolo–Merckx	s.t.
10	Mario Beccia (ITA)	Hoonved–Botecchia	s.t.

General classification after stage 2

Rank	Rider	Team	Time
1	Phil Anderson (AUS)	Peugeot–Shell–Michelin	12h 01' 36"
2	Bernard Vallet (FRA)	La Redoute–Motobécane	+ 38"
3	Ludo Peeters (BEL)	TI–Raleigh–Campagnolo–Merckx	+ 44"
4	Sean Kelly (IRL)	SEM–France Loire–Campagnolo	+ 46"
5	Gregor Braun (FRG)	Capri Sonne–Campagnolo–Merckx	+ 53"
6	Jacques Michaud (FRA)	Coop–Mercier–Mavic	+ 57"
7	Bernard Hinault (FRA)	Renault–Elf–Gitane	+ 58"
8	Henk Lubberding (NED)	TI–Raleigh–Campagnolo–Merckx	+ 1' 01"
9	Gerrie Knetemann (NED)	TI–Raleigh–Campagnolo–Merckx	+ 1' 05"
10	Régis Clère (FRA)	Coop–Mercier–Mavic	+ 1' 11"

== Stage 3 ==
5 July 1982 — Nancy to Longwy, 131 km (81 mi)

Stage 3 result

Rank	Rider	Team	Time
1	Daniel Willems (BEL)	Sunair–Colnago–Campagnolo	3h 18' 07"
2	Serge Demierre (SUI)	Cilo–Aufina	s.t.
3	Sean Kelly (IRL)	SEM–France Loire–Campagnolo	+ 5"
4	Johan van der Velde (NED)	TI–Raleigh–Campagnolo–Merckx	s.t.
5	Bernard Vallet (FRA)	La Redoute–Motobécane	s.t.
6	Pierre-Raymond Villemiane (FRA)	Wolber-Spidel	s.t.
7	Klaus-Peter Thaler (FRG)	Puch–Eurotex–Campagnolo	s.t.
8	Beat Breu (SUI)	Cilo–Aufina	s.t.
9	Jean-René Bernaudeau (FRA)	Peugeot–Shell–Michelin	s.t.
10	Leo van Vliet (NED)	TI–Raleigh–Campagnolo–Merckx	s.t.

General classification after stage 3

Rank	Rider	Team	Time
1	Phil Anderson (AUS)	Peugeot–Shell–Michelin	15h 19' 26"
2	Bernard Hinault (FRA)	Renault–Elf–Gitane	+ 50"
3	Sean Kelly (IRL)	SEM–France Loire–Campagnolo	+ 1' 00"
4	Bernard Vallet (FRA)	La Redoute–Motobécane	+ 1' 10"
5	Daniel Willems (BEL)	Sunair–Colnago–Campagnolo	+ 1' 15"
6	Ludo Peeters (BEL)	TI–Raleigh–Campagnolo–Merckx	+ 1' 16"
7	Henk Lubberding (NED)	TI–Raleigh–Campagnolo–Merckx	+ 1' 29"
8	Jacques Michaud (FRA)	Coop–Mercier–Mavic	s.t.
9	Serge Demierre (SUI)	Cilo–Aufina	+ 1' 36"
10	Gerrie Knetemann (NED)	TI–Raleigh–Campagnolo–Merckx	+ 1' 37"

== Stage 4 ==
6 July 1982 — Beauraing (Belgium) to Mouscron (Belgium), 224 km (139 mi)

Stage 4 result

Rank	Rider	Team	Time
1	Gerrie Knetemann (NED)	TI–Raleigh–Campagnolo–Merckx	5h 46' 16"
2	Sean Kelly (IRL)	SEM–France Loire–Campagnolo	s.t.
3	Gregor Braun (FRG)	Capri Sonne–Campagnolo–Merckx	s.t.
4	Jean-Luc Vandenbroucke (BEL)	La Redoute–Motobécane	s.t.
5	Eddy Planckaert (BEL)	Wickes–Bouwmarkt–Splendor	s.t.
6	Silvestro Milani (ITA)	Hoonved–Botecchia	s.t.
7	Stefan Mutter (SUI)	Puch–Eurotex–Campagnolo	s.t.
8	Etienne De Wilde (BEL)	La Redoute–Motobécane	s.t.
9	Yvon Bertin (FRA)	Coop–Mercier–Mavic	s.t.
10	Klaus-Peter Thaler (FRG)	Puch–Eurotex–Campagnolo	s.t.

General classification after stage 4

Rank	Rider	Team	Time
1	Phil Anderson (AUS)	Peugeot–Shell–Michelin	21h 05' 10"
2	Sean Kelly (IRL)	SEM–France Loire–Campagnolo	+ 28"
3	Bernard Hinault (FRA)	Renault–Elf–Gitane	+ 1' 02"
4	Daniel Willems (BEL)	Sunair–Colnago–Campagnolo	+ 1' 39"
5	Gerrie Knetemann (NED)	TI–Raleigh–Campagnolo–Merckx	s.t.
6	Bernard Vallet (FRA)	La Redoute–Motobécane	+ 1' 42"
7	Ludo Peeters (BEL)	TI–Raleigh–Campagnolo–Merckx	+ 1' 48"
8	Henk Lubberding (NED)	TI–Raleigh–Campagnolo–Merckx	+ 2' 01"
9	Jacques Michaud (FRA)	Coop–Mercier–Mavic	s.t.
10	Serge Demierre (SUI)	Cilo–Aufina	+ 2' 08"

== Stage 5 ==
7 July 1982 — Orchies to Fontaine-au-Pire, 73 km (45 mi) (TTT)

This stage was annulled due to a demonstration and replaced by stage 9a.

== Stage 6 ==
8 July 1982 — Lille, 233 km (145 mi)

Stage 6 result

Rank	Rider	Team	Time
1	Jan Raas (NED)	TI–Raleigh–Campagnolo–Merckx	5h 55' 42"
2	Jos Jacobs (BEL)	Vermeer–Thijs–Gios	+ 10"
3	Pierre Le Bigaut (FRA)	Coop–Mercier–Mavic	s.t.
4	René Martens (BEL)	DAF Trucks–Tévé Blad–Rossin	s.t.
5	Adri van Houwelingen (NED)	Vermeer–Thijs–Gios	s.t.
6	Kim Andersen (DEN)	Coop–Mercier–Mavic	s.t.
7	Dominique Arnaud (FRA)	Wolber-Spidel	s.t.
8	Sean Kelly (IRL)	SEM–France Loire–Campagnolo	+ 24"
9	Pierre-Raymond Villemiane (FRA)	Wolber-Spidel	s.t.
10	William Tackaert (BEL)	DAF Trucks–Tévé Blad–Rossin	s.t.

General classification after stage 6

Rank	Rider	Team	Time
1	Phil Anderson (AUS)	Peugeot–Shell–Michelin	27h 01' 16"
2	Sean Kelly (IRL)	SEM–France Loire–Campagnolo	+ 28"
3	Bernard Hinault (FRA)	Renault–Elf–Gitane	+ 1' 02"
4	Daniel Willems (BEL)	Sunair–Colnago–Campagnolo	+ 1' 39"
5	Gerrie Knetemann (NED)	TI–Raleigh–Campagnolo–Merckx	s.t.
6	Bernard Vallet (FRA)	La Redoute–Motobécane	+ 1' 42"
7	Ludo Peeters (BEL)	TI–Raleigh–Campagnolo–Merckx	+ 1' 48"
8	Henk Lubberding (NED)	TI–Raleigh–Campagnolo–Merckx	+ 2' 01"
9	Jacques Michaud (FRA)	Coop–Mercier–Mavic	s.t.
10	Gregor Braun (FRG)	Capri Sonne–Campagnolo–Merckx	+ 2' 11"

== Stage 7 ==
10 July 1982 — Cancale to Concarneau, 240 km (150 mi)

Stage 7 result

Rank	Rider	Team	Time
1	Pol Verschuere (BEL)	Vermeer–Thijs–Gios	6h 07' 12"
2	Ad Wijnands (NED)	TI–Raleigh–Campagnolo–Merckx	s.t.
3	William Tackaert (BEL)	DAF Trucks–Tévé Blad–Rossin	s.t.
4	Pascal Poisson (FRA)	Renault–Elf–Gitane	s.t.
5	Theo de Rooij (NED)	Capri Sonne–Campagnolo–Merckx	s.t.
6	Pierre-Henri Menthéour (FRA)	Coop–Mercier–Mavic	s.t.
7	Guy Nulens (BEL)	DAF Trucks–Tévé Blad–Rossin	+ 23"
8	Adri van Houwelingen (NED)	Vermeer–Thijs–Gios	s.t.
9	Christian Seznec (FRA)	Wolber-Spidel	s.t.
10	Patrick Clerc (FRA)	SEM–France Loire–Campagnolo	s.t.

General classification after stage 7

Rank	Rider	Team	Time
1	Phil Anderson (AUS)	Peugeot–Shell–Michelin	33h 08' 39"
2	Sean Kelly (IRL)	SEM–France Loire–Campagnolo	+ 36"
3	Bernard Hinault (FRA)	Renault–Elf–Gitane	+ 1' 06"
4	Daniel Willems (BEL)	Sunair–Colnago–Campagnolo	+ 1' 51"
5	Gerrie Knetemann (NED)	TI–Raleigh–Campagnolo–Merckx	s.t.
6	Bernard Vallet (FRA)	La Redoute–Motobécane	+ 1' 54"
7	Ludo Peeters (BEL)	TI–Raleigh–Campagnolo–Merckx	+ 2' 00"
8	Henk Lubberding (NED)	TI–Raleigh–Campagnolo–Merckx	+ 2' 13"
9	Jacques Michaud (FRA)	Coop–Mercier–Mavic	s.t.
10	Régis Clère (FRA)	Coop–Mercier–Mavic	+ 2' 27"

== Stage 8 ==
11 July 1982 — Concarneau to Châteaulin, 200.85 km (124.80 mi)

Stage 8 result

Rank	Rider	Team	Time
1	Frank Hoste (BEL)	TI–Raleigh–Campagnolo–Merckx	5h 03' 30"
2	Bruno Leali (ITA)	Inoxpran–Pentole Posate	s.t.
3	Claude Criquielion (BEL)	Wickes–Bouwmarkt–Splendor	s.t.
4	Theo de Rooij (NED)	Capri Sonne–Campagnolo–Merckx	s.t.
5	Beat Breu (SUI)	Cilo–Aufina	s.t.
6	Stefan Mutter (SUI)	Puch–Eurotex–Campagnolo	s.t.
7	Marino Lejarreta (ESP)	Teka	s.t.
8	Mario Beccia (ITA)	Hoonved–Botecchia	s.t.
9	Ludo Peeters (BEL)	TI–Raleigh–Campagnolo–Merckx	s.t.
10	Sven-Åke Nilsson (SWE)	Wolber-Spidel	s.t.

General classification after stage 8

Rank	Rider	Team	Time
1	Phil Anderson (AUS)	Peugeot–Shell–Michelin	38h 12' 01"
2	Sean Kelly (IRL)	SEM–France Loire–Campagnolo	+ 48"
3	Bernard Hinault (FRA)	Renault–Elf–Gitane	+ 1' 18"
4	Régis Clère (FRA)	Coop–Mercier–Mavic	+ 1' 51"
5	Daniel Willems (BEL)	Sunair–Colnago–Campagnolo	+ 2' 03"
6	Gerrie Knetemann (NED)	TI–Raleigh–Campagnolo–Merckx	s.t.
7	Bernard Vallet (FRA)	La Redoute–Motobécane	+ 2' 06"
8	Ludo Peeters (BEL)	TI–Raleigh–Campagnolo–Merckx	+ 2' 08"
9	Henk Lubberding (NED)	TI–Raleigh–Campagnolo–Merckx	+ 2' 25"
10	Jacques Michaud (FRA)	Coop–Mercier–Mavic	s.t.

== Stage 9a ==
12 July 1982 — Lorient to Plumelec, 69 km (43 mi) (TTT)

Stage 9a result

Rank	Team	Time
1	TI–Raleigh–Campagnolo–Merckx	1h 29' 38"
2	Renault–Elf–Gitane	+ 1' 10"
3	Sunair–Colnago–Campagnolo	+ 2' 51"
4	Coop–Mercier–Mavic	+ 3' 05"
5	Peugeot–Shell–Michelin	s.t.
6	DAF Trucks–Tévé Blad–Rossin	+ 3' 26"
7	Cilo–Aufina	+ 3' 29"
8	Capri Sonne–Campagnolo–Merckx	+ 3' 57"
9	La Redoute–Motobécane	+ 4' 27"
10	SEM–France Loire–Campagnolo	+ 4' 31"

General classification after stage 9a

Rank	Rider	Team	Time
1	Phil Anderson (AUS)	Peugeot–Shell–Michelin	38h 10' 01"
2	Bernard Hinault (FRA)	Renault–Elf–Gitane	+ 28"
3	Gerrie Knetemann (NED)	TI–Raleigh–Campagnolo–Merckx	+ 48"
4	Ludo Peeters (BEL)	TI–Raleigh–Campagnolo–Merckx	+ 53"
5	Henk Lubberding (NED)	TI–Raleigh–Campagnolo–Merckx	+ 1' 10"
6	Daniel Willems (BEL)	Sunair–Colnago–Campagnolo	+ 1' 33"
7	Régis Clère (FRA)	Coop–Mercier–Mavic	+ 1' 36"
8	Sean Kelly (IRL)	SEM–France Loire–Campagnolo	+ 1' 48"
9	Johan van der Velde (NED)	TI–Raleigh–Campagnolo–Merckx	+ 1' 53"
10	Patrick Bonnet (FRA)	Renault–Elf–Gitane	s.t.

== Stage 9b ==
12 July 1982 — Plumelec to Nantes, 132 km (82 mi)

Stage 9b result

Rank	Rider	Team	Time
1	Stefan Mutter (SUI)	Puch–Eurotex–Campagnolo	3h 07' 32"
2	Pierre-Raymond Villemiane (FRA)	Wolber-Spidel	+ 58"
3	Jan Raas (NED)	TI–Raleigh–Campagnolo–Merckx	+ 59"
4	Eddy Planckaert (BEL)	Wickes–Bouwmarkt–Splendor	+ 1' 03"
5	Sean Kelly (IRL)	SEM–France Loire–Campagnolo	s.t.
6	Leo van Vliet (NED)	TI–Raleigh–Campagnolo–Merckx	s.t.
7	Ad Wijnands (NED)	TI–Raleigh–Campagnolo–Merckx	s.t.
8	Christian Jourdan (FRA)	La Redoute–Motobécane	s.t.
9	Jean-François Rault (FRA)	Wolber-Spidel	s.t.
10	Phil Anderson (AUS)	Peugeot–Shell–Michelin	s.t.

General classification after stage 9b

Rank	Rider	Team	Time
1	Phil Anderson (AUS)	Peugeot–Shell–Michelin	41h 18' 36"
2	Bernard Hinault (FRA)	Renault–Elf–Gitane	+ 28"
3	Gerrie Knetemann (NED)	TI–Raleigh–Campagnolo–Merckx	+ 48"
4	Ludo Peeters (BEL)	TI–Raleigh–Campagnolo–Merckx	+ 53"
5	Daniel Willems (BEL)	Sunair–Colnago–Campagnolo	+ 1' 29"
6	Henk Lubberding (NED)	TI–Raleigh–Campagnolo–Merckx	+ 1' 43"
7	Sean Kelly (IRL)	SEM–France Loire–Campagnolo	+ 1' 48"
8	Johan van der Velde (NED)	TI–Raleigh–Campagnolo–Merckx	+ 1' 53"
9	Marc Madiot (FRA)	Renault–Elf–Gitane	+ 2' 00"
10	Régis Clère (FRA)	Coop–Mercier–Mavic	+ 2' 09"

== Stage 10 ==
13 July 1982 — Saintes to Bordeaux, 147.2 km (91.5 mi)

Stage 10 result

Rank	Rider	Team	Time
1	Pierre-Raymond Villemiane (FRA)	Wolber-Spidel	3h 16' 51"
2	Sean Kelly (IRL)	SEM–France Loire–Campagnolo	+ 2"
3	Eddy Planckaert (BEL)	Wickes–Bouwmarkt–Splendor	s.t.
4	Jan Raas (NED)	TI–Raleigh–Campagnolo–Merckx	s.t.
5	Eric McKenzie (NZL)	Capri Sonne–Campagnolo–Merckx	s.t.
6	Etienne De Wilde (BEL)	La Redoute–Motobécane	s.t.
7	Pierre Le Bigaut (FRA)	Coop–Mercier–Mavic	s.t.
8	William Tackaert (BEL)	DAF Trucks–Tévé Blad–Rossin	s.t.
9	Adri van Houwelingen (NED)	Vermeer–Thijs–Gios	s.t.
10	Fons De Wolf (BEL)	Vermeer–Thijs–Gios	s.t.

General classification after stage 10

Rank	Rider	Team	Time
1	Phil Anderson (AUS)	Peugeot–Shell–Michelin	44h 35' 01"
2	Bernard Hinault (FRA)	Renault–Elf–Gitane	+ 44"
3	Gerrie Knetemann (NED)	TI–Raleigh–Campagnolo–Merckx	+ 1' 16"
4	Ludo Peeters (BEL)	TI–Raleigh–Campagnolo–Merckx	+ 1' 21"
5	Sean Kelly (IRL)	SEM–France Loire–Campagnolo	+ 1' 48"
6	Daniel Willems (BEL)	Sunair–Colnago–Campagnolo	+ 1' 57"
7	Henk Lubberding (NED)	TI–Raleigh–Campagnolo–Merckx	+ 2' 11"
8	Johan van der Velde (NED)	TI–Raleigh–Campagnolo–Merckx	+ 2' 21"
9	Marc Madiot (FRA)	Renault–Elf–Gitane	+ 2' 28"
10	Régis Clère (FRA)	Coop–Mercier–Mavic	+ 2' 37
