= 1982 Tour de France =

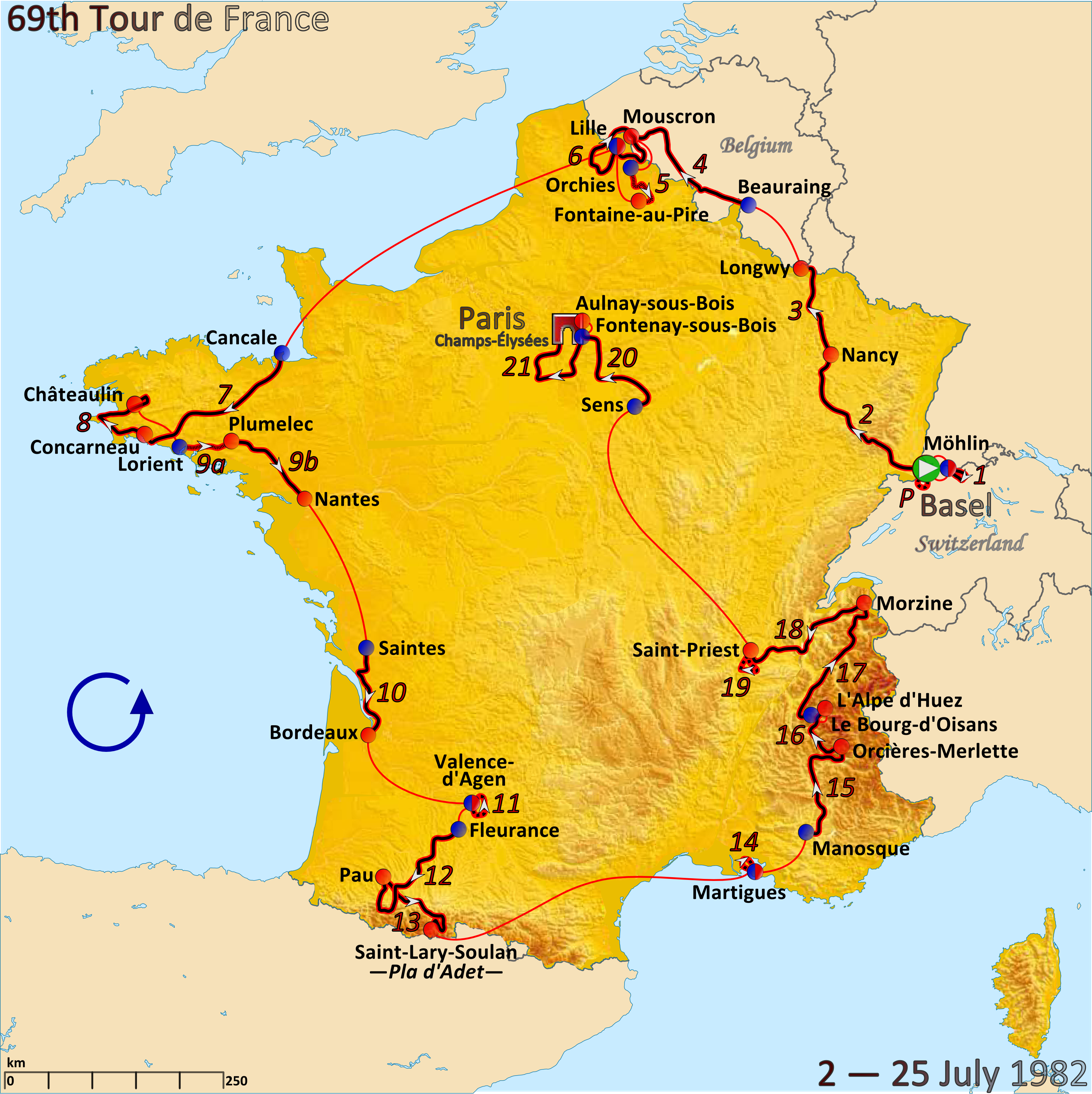
- Route of the 1982 Tour de France

Race details
- Dates: 2–25 July 1982
- Stages: 21 + Prologue, including one split stage
- Distance: 3,507 km (2,179 mi)
- Winning time: 92h 08' 46"

Results
Jersey awarded to the overall winner	Winner	Bernard Hinault (FRA)	(Renault–Elf–Gitane)
	Second	Joop Zoetemelk (NED)	(COOP–Mercier–Mavic)
	Third	Johan van der Velde (NED)	(TI–Raleigh–Campagnolo)
Jersey awarded to the points classification winner	Points	Sean Kelly (IRE)	(Sem–France Loire–Campagnolo)
Jersey awarded to the mountains classification winner	Mountains	Bernard Vallet (FRA)	(La Redoute–Motobécane)
Jersey awarded to the young rider classification winner	Young rider	Phil Anderson (AUS)	(Peugeot–Shell–Michelin)
	Combination	Bernard Hinault (FRA)	(Renault–Elf–Gitane)
	Sprints	Sean Kelly (IRE)	(Sem–France Loire–Campagnolo)
	Combativity	Régis Clère (FRA)	(COOP–Mercier–Mavic)
	Team	COOP–Mercier–Mavic	
	Team points	TI–Raleigh–Campagnolo	

The 1982 Tour de France was the 69th edition of the Tour de France, taking place from 2 to 25 July. The total race distance was 22 stages over 3,507 km (2,179 mi). It was won by Bernard Hinault, his fourth victory so far.

== Teams ==
In response to the finish of the 1981 Tour de France, French minister of sports Edwige Avice objected to the amount of advertising in the race, and suggested the Tour to return to the national team format. The Tour organisation needed the money brought in by the sponsors, and no changes were made to the team structure.

The Tour organisation decided to start with 17 teams, each with 10 cyclists, for a total of 170, a new record. Tour director Félix Lévitan suggested to reduce the number of cyclists by starting with teams of 9 cyclists, but this was rejected. Teams could submit a request to join until 15 May 1982. To promote cycling in the United States of America, the American national cycling team would automatically be accepted, but the American team made no request.

The teams entering the race were:

- Renault–Elf–Gitane
- La Redoute–Motobécane
- TI–Raleigh–Campagnolo
- Capri Sonne–Campagnolo–Merckx
- Peugeot–Shell–Michelin
- Splendor–Wickes Bouwmarkt
- Vermeer Thijs
- Sem–France Loire–Campagnolo
- Sunair–Colnago–Campagnolo
- DAF Trucks–TeVe Blad
- COOP–Mercier–Mavic
- Teka
- Wolber–Spidel
- Puch–Eorotex–Campagnolo
- Inoxpran
- Cilo–Aufina
- Hoonved–Bottecchia

== Pre-race favourites ==
Hinault, who had won the Tour in 1978, 1979 and 1981, and left the 1980 Tour in leading position, was the clear favourite for the victory. In those other years, Hinault had won several races before the Tour, but in 1982 he had only won one major race, the 1982 Giro d'Italia. Hinault tried to be the fourth cyclist, after Fausto Coppi, Jacques Anquetil and Eddy Merckx, to win the Giro-Tour double.

Notable absent was Lucien Van Impe, who was second in the 1981 Tour de France, winning the mountains classification. Since the 1969 Tour de France, Van Impe had started each edition, winning the general classification in the 1976 Tour and the mountains classification five times. Van Impe wanted to join, but his team Metauro was not invited, as the organisation considered it not strong enough to ride both the Giro and the Tour. Van Impe tried to find a team to hire him only for the 1982 Tour, but was not successful.

Even though Joop Zoetemelk was 35 years old and no longer considered a favourite, he still managed to finish in second place, for the sixth time and final time.

== Route and stages ==
The 1982 Tour de France started on 2 July, and had two rest days, in Lille and Martigues. The highest point of elevation in the race was 1,860 m (6,100 ft) at the summit of the Alpe d'Huez climb on stage 16.

Stage characteristics and winners
Stage	Date	Course	Distance	Type	Winner
P	2 July	Basel (Switzerland)	7 km (4.3 mi)	Individual time trial	Bernard Hinault (FRA)
1	3 July	Basel (Switzerland) to Möhlin (Switzerland)	207 km (129 mi)	Hilly stage	Ludo Peeters (BEL)
2	4 July	Basel (Switzerland) to Nancy	250 km (160 mi)	Plain stage	Phil Anderson (AUS)
3	5 July	Nancy to Longwy	134 km (83 mi)	Plain stage	Daniel Willems (BEL)
4	6 July	Beauraing (Belgium) to Mouscron (Belgium)	219 km (136 mi)	Plain stage	Gerrie Knetemann (NED)
5	7 July	Orchies to Fontaine-au-Pire	73 km (45 mi)	Team time trial	Cancelled and replaced by stage 9a
6	8 July	Lille	233 km (145 mi)	Plain stage	Jan Raas (NED)
	9 July	Lille		Rest day	
7	10 July	Cancale to Concarneau	235 km (146 mi)	Plain stage	Pol Verschuere (BEL)
8	11 July	Concarneau to Châteaulin	201 km (125 mi)	Plain stage	Frank Hoste (BEL)
9a	12 July	Lorient to Plumelec	69 km (43 mi)	Team time trial	(Netherlands) TI–Raleigh–Campagnolo
9b	12 July	Plumelec to Nantes	138 km (86 mi)	Plain stage	Stefan Mutter (SUI)
10	13 July	Saintes to Bordeaux	147 km (91 mi)	Plain stage	Pierre-Raymond Villemiane (FRA)
11	14 July	Valence d'Agen	57 km (35 mi)	Individual time trial	Gerrie Knetemann (NED)
12	15 July	Fleurance to Pau	249 km (155 mi)	Stage with mountain(s)	Sean Kelly (IRE)
13	16 July	Pau to Saint-Lary-Soulan Pla d'Adet	122 km (76 mi)	Stage with mountain(s)	Beat Breu (SUI)
	17 July	Martigues		Rest day	
14	18 July	Martigues	33 km (21 mi)	Individual time trial	Bernard Hinault (FRA)
15	19 July	Manosque to Orcières-Merlette	208 km (129 mi)	Stage with mountain(s)	Pascal Simon (FRA)
16	20 July	Orcières-Merlette to Alpe d'Huez	123 km (76 mi)	Stage with mountain(s)	Beat Breu (SUI)
17	21 July	Le Bourg-d'Oisans to Morzine	251 km (156 mi)	Stage with mountain(s)	Peter Winnen (NED)
18	22 July	Morzine to Saint-Priest	233 km (145 mi)	Plain stage	Adrie van Houwelingen (NED)
19	23 July	Saint-Priest	48 km (30 mi)	Individual time trial	Bernard Hinault (FRA)
20	24 July	Sens to Aulnay-sous-Bois	161 km (100 mi)	Plain stage	Daniel Willems (BEL)
21	25 July	Fontenay-sous-Bois to Paris (Champs-Élysées)	187 km (116 mi)	Plain stage	Bernard Hinault (FRA)
	Total		3,507 km (2,179 mi)		

== Race overview ==
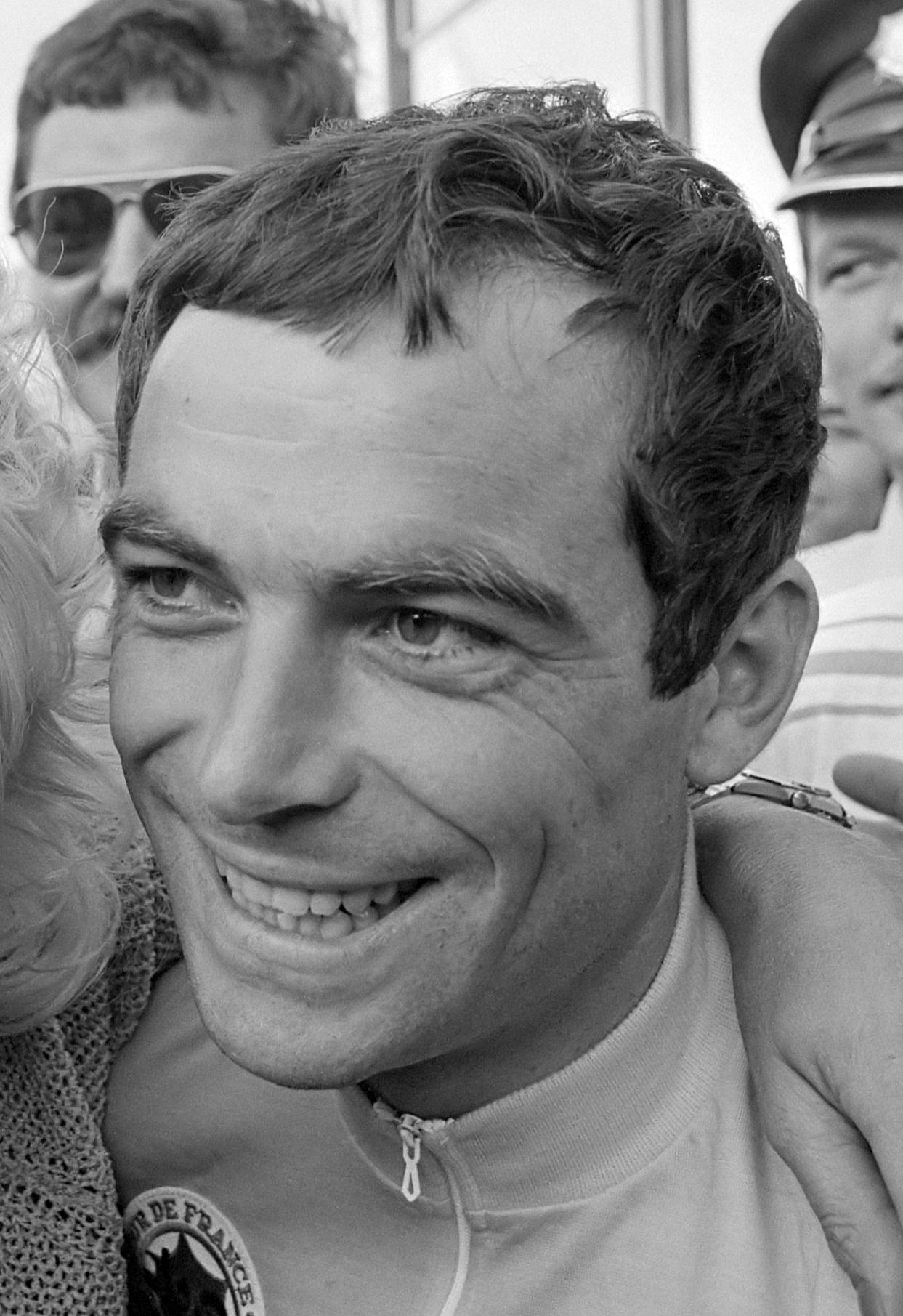
Bernard Hinault (pictured in 1982), winner of the general classification

The Prologue was won by Hinault who finished seven seconds faster than Gerrie Knetemann. In stage 1 Ludo Peeters escaped to win the stage by 0:38 over the main field leaving Sean Kelly and Jan Raas to sprint for 2nd place and in conjunction with the time bonus for winning the stage, Peeters moved into the overall lead by 0:14 over Hinault. Stage 2 included a rare climb up the Ballon d'Alsace in northeastern France, which was a popular climb in the 1930s TDF editions, but this was only the 3rd time it had been included in the route since World War II. Bernard Vallet would attack the climb for the KOM points but Phil Anderson would win the stage and for the second year in a row don the yellow jersey for at least a day. Vallet moved into 2nd 0:38 behind Anderson as Peeters fell to third and Hinault ended up in 7th nearly a minute down strangely setting the stage for a repeat of the surprise from the year before, when Anderson became a challenger to Hinault in a similar manner to Cyrille Guimard becoming the only realistic challenger to Eddy Merckx during the 1972 Tour de France.

Stage's 3 and 4 were won by Daniel Willems and Gerrie Knetemann who would each win the final two stages of their TDF careers in 1982. In the Points Competition Sean Kelly took command of the green jersey having been competitive in the sprints, would not relinquish it the rest of the Tour and due to time bonuses he moved into 2nd place overall. Stage 5 was a TTT that began no different than any other Team Time Trial but during the stage angry ironworkers from the Usinor steel company blocked the road and interrupted the stage to the point it had to be postponed. Stage 6 was won by Raas handily, leaving Jos Jacobs and Pierre La Bigaut to sprint for 2nd five seconds later and Stage 7 was decided in a sprint finish by Pol Verschuere.

Stage 8 was a circuit finish with fifteen laps of a 6 km course planned in the city of Châteaulin. French rider Régis Clère devised a plan to escape the Peloton and arrive in town far ahead of the other riders in an attempt to question whether or not it would be legally within the rules to arrive on the circuit and complete the first lap and then follow in the slipstream of the main field once they arrived on the circuit and coast his way to victory riding at the back of the pack. Unfortunately for Clère, even though at one point he had built up about a ten-minute gap, he would end up getting a flat tire and then suffer a mechanical costing him so much time that the main field would catch him before he reached town and following the laps around the circuit Frank Hoste would end up out sprinting Claude Criquielion and Bruno Leali in a bunch finish.

Stage 9A was the TTT originally scheduled as stage 5 and Tour organizers decided to have the riders actual times only count towards the general classification in the overall team race as individually riders were awarded time bonuses. As a result, Anderson remained in the overall lead but due to the strong 2nd-place finish of Team Renault–Elf–Gitane Hinault was now in 2nd place just 0:28 off the lead. Winning the stage was the consistently dominant TI–Raleigh–Campagnolo–Merckx squad who caused Kelly, Clére, Willems and Vallet to each drop in the standings as Raleigh now had four riders in the Top 10 overall with Johan van der Velde being their primary GC contender now sitting in 8th place at 1:53 behind. The originally scheduled Stage 9 was now Stage 9B and was won by Stefan Mutter who crossed the line 0:58 ahead of 2nd place Pierre-Raymond Villemiane and had more than a minute advantage over the main field. In Stage 10 Villemiane would win the stage, besting the likes of Kelly, Raas and Eddy Planckaert by two seconds as the overall situation remained the same going into the ITT prior to the start of high mountain stages in the Pyrenees.

The individual time trial in Stage 11 was won by Gerrie Knetemann who beat Hinault by 0:18. The last time Knetemann had beaten Hinault in a TDF ITT was in the Prologue of the 1979 Tour de France, although since that time Knetemann was among the very few riders able to ride individually at the same level as Hinault having come within 0:30 of The Badger of five occasions and just ten seconds on three occasions. Aside from Hinault out of the 125+ riders still in the Tour at this point only Jan van Houwelingen, Joop Zoetemelk and Daniel Willems finished within 2:30 of Knetemann's time. Phil Anderson finished more than 3:00 back falling to 3rd place in the overall standings meaning he was now more than 2:00 behind the new overall leader Hinault. The sportswriters were correctly beginning to fear that Hinault was going to run away with his 4th Tour victory as 2nd place Knetemann was not considered an overall threat to the yellow jersey and aside from Anderson in 3rd the only other rider remotely close to Hinault was the now 7th placed Zoetemelk, who might have given Hinault one of his only serious challenges between 1978 and 1980, but at this point Zoetemelk was pushing 36 years old, was one of the oldest riders in the peloton and admitted, just as he had in his very first Tour back in the 1970 Tour de France against Merckx, that he was up against the greatest rider in the world and was only riding to beat everybody else.

Stage 12 would be the first high mountain and therefore bring clarity to the overall situation, which included a climb of the Col d'Aubisque. Sean Kelly survived with the elite riders and was therefore able to win the stage by out sprinting Anderson and Van de Velde at the finish. Zoetemelk, Vallet and Hinault also came across in good order with Hinault leading 2nd place Anderson by 2:03, Zoetemelk by 4:26 and everybody else by well over 5:00. Stage 13 included the Col d'Aspin and was won by Swiss rider Beat Breu who soloed across the finish ahead of the GC riders by 0:35 starting with Robert Alban in 2nd. Hinault kept Zoetemelk close all day and crossed five seconds ahead of him as Anderson and Van der Velde were each dropped and lost about a minute apiece.

Following the rest day before immediately going to the French Alps was another individual time trial, which this time was won by Bernard Hinault who only had Houwelingen, Vallet, Zoetemelk and Daniel Gisiger finish within a minute of him as he now lead everybody in the overall situation by more than 5:00. Stage 15 was won by Pascal Simon who was just able to stay away from Pierre-Henri Menthéour to take the stage as Hinault, even though he finished outside the top 10 on the stage, now had everyone except for Zoetemelk getting close to, or already beyond a 10:00 deficit. Stage 16 included the famed climb Alpe d'Huez and was almost a repeat in the top 5 from stage 13 with Beat Breu winning the day, and Alban, Alberto Fernández and Raymond Martin being the next riders to cross the finish. Hinault came across comfortably in 5th with Zoetemelk and Peter Winnen accompanying him. Stage 17 was won by Winnen, who moved into 3rd place overall 7:13 behind Hinault who kept Zoetemelk marked all day and lead the elite riders across the line some two and a half minutes after Winnen methodically hammering out the final kilometres in the mountains with his 4th Tour victory in five years all but assured. Also on this stage Bernard Vallet ended up being dropped by the GC favorites and fell out of the top 10 overall, but he had gained enough points in the King of the Mountains competition to assure himself of the victory over Jean-René Bernaudeau meaning as long as he finished the final few stages he would be wearing the Polka Dot Jersey on the podium in Paris.

In stage 18 Adri van Houwelingen won the day by surviving a solo breakaway finishing 10:31 ahead of the rest of the field. Stage 19 was the final time trial of the Tour and without much drama in the air the stage was won by Hinault with Gerrie Knetemann :09 behind him. As a result, the final overall standings seemed to be in place with Anderson in 5th, Winnen falling back to 4th, Van der Velde jumping up to 3rd with Hinault and Zoetemelk remaining 1st and 2nd respectively. Stage 20 was a sprint finish won by Daniel Willems and going into the final stage on the Champs-Élysées many in the press had accused Hinault of riding a boring race, even though he was about to become a four time Tour de France champion. Hinault responded by risking crashing and getting injured by getting to the front of the pack once the race hit the circuit finish on the Champs-Élysées where he was able to out sprint the likes of Yvon Bertin, former Green Jersey winner Rudy Pevenage, a surprising Paul Sherwen, Fons de Wolf and everybody else dreaming of glory to seize the biggest sprinter's stage of them all.

On the final podiums in Paris the Most Combative Rider award went to Régis Clère, the Polka Dot Jersey was won by Bernard Vallet, the Points Competition was won by Sean Kelly, which he would win three more times in his career, the Best Young Rider was won by Phil Anderson ahead of Kim Andersen and Marc Madiot and the Team Competition was won by Coop–Mercier–Mavic. In 3rd place on the overall podium was Johan van der Velde, in 2nd place for 6th and final time, setting a record that will likely never be equaled was Joop Zoetemelk, who also set a record for his 11th Top 5 finish and joining the likes of Coppi, Anquetil and Merckx by winning the Giro-Tour double was Bernard Hinault.

== Classification leadership and minor prizes ==
There were several classifications in the 1982 Tour de France, four of them awarding jerseys to their leaders. The most important was the general classification, calculated by adding each cyclist's finishing times on each stage. The cyclist with the least accumulated time was the race leader, identified by the yellow jersey; the winner of this classification is considered the winner of the Tour.

Additionally, there was a points classification, where cyclists got points for finishing among the best in a stage finish, or in intermediate sprints. The cyclist with the most points lead the classification, and was identified with a green jersey.

There was also a mountains classification. The organisation had categorised some climbs as either hors catégorie, first, second, third, or fourth-category; points for this classification were won by the first cyclists that reached the top of these climbs first, with more points available for the higher-categorised climbs. The cyclist with the most points lead the classification, and wore a white jersey with red polka dots.

Another classification was the young rider classification. This was decided the same way as the general classification, but only cyclists under 24 were eligible, and the leader wore a white jersey.

The fifth individual classification was the intermediate sprints classification. This classification had similar rules as the points classification, but only points were awarded on intermediate sprints. In 1982, this classification had no associated jersey.

For the team classification, the times of the best three cyclists per team on each stage were added; the leading team was the team with the lowest total time. The riders in the team that led this classification were identified by yellow caps. There was also a team points classification. Cyclists received points according to their finishing position on each stage, with the first rider receiving one point. The first three finishers of each team had their points combined, and the team with the fewest points led the classification. The riders of the team leading this classification wore green caps.

In addition, there was a combativity award given after each mass-start stage to the cyclist considered most combative. The split stages each had a combined winner. The decision was made by a jury composed of journalists who gave points. The cyclist with the most points from votes in all stages led the combativity classification. Régis Clère won this classification, and was given overall the super-combativity award. The Souvenir Henri Desgrange was given in honour of Tour founder Henri Desgrange to the first rider to pass the summit of the Col d'Aubisque on stage 12. This prize was won by Beat Breu.

In the 1981 Tour de France, Urs Freuler, Eddy Planckaert and Walter Planckaert had left the race before the Alps. The Tour organisers did not want this to happen again, so in 1982, cyclists were not allowed to leave the Tour without a good reason. A cyclist that left the Tour unauthorized would lose all the prize money that he won so far, receive a fine, and would not be allowed to join the next year.

Classification leadership by stage
Stage	Stage winner	General classification	Points classification	Mountains classification	Young rider classification	Combination classification	Intermediate sprints classification	Team classifications		Combativity award
Stage	Stage winner	General classification	Points classification	Mountains classification	Young rider classification	Combination classification	Intermediate sprints classification	By time	By points	Combativity award
P	Bernard Hinault	Bernard Hinault	Bernard Hinault	Jan Raas	Phil Anderson	Gerrie Knetemann	no award	COOP–Mercier–Mavic	COOP–Mercier–Mavic	not awarded
1	Ludo Peeters	Ludo Peeters	Ludo Peeters	Bernard Vallet	Phil Anderson	Ludo Peeters	Serge Demierre	TI–Raleigh–Campagnolo	TI–Raleigh–Campagnolo	Bernard Bourreau
2	Phil Anderson	Phil Anderson	Sean Kelly	Bernard Vallet	Phil Anderson	Phil Anderson	Sean Kelly	TI–Raleigh–Campagnolo	TI–Raleigh–Campagnolo	Jacques Michaud
3	Daniel Willems	Phil Anderson	Sean Kelly	Bernard Vallet	Phil Anderson	Phil Anderson	Sean Kelly	TI–Raleigh–Campagnolo	TI–Raleigh–Campagnolo	Daniel Willems
4	Gerrie Knetemann	Phil Anderson	Sean Kelly	Bernard Vallet	Phil Anderson	Phil Anderson	Sean Kelly	TI–Raleigh–Campagnolo	TI–Raleigh–Campagnolo	Bernard Vallet
5	—	Phil Anderson	Sean Kelly	Bernard Vallet	Phil Anderson	Phil Anderson	Sean Kelly	TI–Raleigh–Campagnolo	TI–Raleigh–Campagnolo	—
6	Jan Raas	Phil Anderson	Sean Kelly	Bernard Vallet	Phil Anderson	Phil Anderson	Sean Kelly	TI–Raleigh–Campagnolo	TI–Raleigh–Campagnolo	Adri van der Poel
7	Pol Verschuere	Phil Anderson	Sean Kelly	Bernard Vallet	Phil Anderson	Phil Anderson	Sean Kelly	TI–Raleigh–Campagnolo	TI–Raleigh–Campagnolo	
8	Frank Hoste	Phil Anderson	Sean Kelly	Bernard Vallet	Phil Anderson	Phil Anderson	Sean Kelly	TI–Raleigh–Campagnolo	TI–Raleigh–Campagnolo	Régis Clère
9a	TI–Raleigh–Campagnolo	Phil Anderson	Sean Kelly	Bernard Vallet	Phil Anderson	Phil Anderson	Sean Kelly	TI–Raleigh–Campagnolo	TI–Raleigh–Campagnolo	
9b	Stefan Mutter	Phil Anderson	Sean Kelly	Bernard Vallet	Phil Anderson	Phil Anderson	Sean Kelly	TI–Raleigh–Campagnolo	TI–Raleigh–Campagnolo	
10	Pierre-Raymond Villemiane	Phil Anderson	Sean Kelly	Bernard Vallet	Phil Anderson	Phil Anderson	Sean Kelly	TI–Raleigh–Campagnolo	TI–Raleigh–Campagnolo	
11	Gerrie Knetemann	Bernard Hinault	Sean Kelly	Bernard Vallet	Phil Anderson	Phil Anderson	Sean Kelly	TI–Raleigh–Campagnolo	TI–Raleigh–Campagnolo	not awarded
12	Sean Kelly	Bernard Hinault	Sean Kelly	Bernard Vallet	Phil Anderson	Phil Anderson	Sean Kelly	TI–Raleigh–Campagnolo	TI–Raleigh–Campagnolo	André Chalmel
13	Beat Breu	Bernard Hinault	Sean Kelly	Bernard Vallet	Phil Anderson	Phil Anderson	Sean Kelly	TI–Raleigh–Campagnolo	TI–Raleigh–Campagnolo	Christian Jourdan
14	Bernard Hinault	Bernard Hinault	Sean Kelly	Bernard Vallet	Phil Anderson	Phil Anderson	Sean Kelly	TI–Raleigh–Campagnolo	TI–Raleigh–Campagnolo	not awarded
15	Pascal Simon	Bernard Hinault	Sean Kelly	Bernard Vallet	Phil Anderson	Bernard Vallet	Sean Kelly	COOP–Mercier–Mavic	TI–Raleigh–Campagnolo	Pascal Simon
16	Beat Breu	Bernard Hinault	Sean Kelly	Bernard Vallet	Phil Anderson	Bernard Hinault	Sean Kelly	COOP–Mercier–Mavic	TI–Raleigh–Campagnolo	Robert Alban
17	Peter Winnen	Bernard Hinault	Sean Kelly	Bernard Vallet	Phil Anderson	Bernard Hinault	Sean Kelly	COOP–Mercier–Mavic	TI–Raleigh–Campagnolo	Marino Lejarreta
18	Adri van Houwelingen	Bernard Hinault	Sean Kelly	Bernard Vallet	Phil Anderson	Bernard Hinault	Sean Kelly	COOP–Mercier–Mavic	TI–Raleigh–Campagnolo	Adri van Houwelingen
19	Bernard Hinault	Bernard Hinault	Sean Kelly	Bernard Vallet	Phil Anderson	Bernard Hinault	Sean Kelly	COOP–Mercier–Mavic	TI–Raleigh–Campagnolo	not awarded
20	Daniel Willems	Bernard Hinault	Sean Kelly	Bernard Vallet	Phil Anderson	Bernard Hinault	Sean Kelly	COOP–Mercier–Mavic	TI–Raleigh–Campagnolo	Hennie Kuiper
21	Bernard Hinault	Bernard Hinault	Sean Kelly	Bernard Vallet	Phil Anderson	Bernard Hinault	Sean Kelly	COOP–Mercier–Mavic	TI–Raleigh–Campagnolo	Hennie Kuiper
Final		Bernard Hinault	Sean Kelly	Bernard Vallet	Phil Anderson	Bernard Hinault	Sean Kelly	COOP–Mercier–Mavic	TI–Raleigh–Campagnolo	Régis Clère

== Final standings ==
Legend
A yellow jersey.	Denotes the winner of the general classification	A green jersey.	Denotes the winner of the points classification
A white jersey with red polka dots.	Denotes the winner of the mountains classification	A white jersey.	Denotes the winner of the young rider classification

=== General classification ===
Final general classification (1–10)
Rank	Rider	Team	Time
1	Bernard Hinault (FRA)	Renault–Elf–Gitane	92h 08' 46"
2	Joop Zoetemelk (NED)	COOP–Mercier–Mavic	+ 6' 21"
3	Johan van der Velde (NED)	TI–Raleigh–Campagnolo	+ 8' 59"
4	Peter Winnen (NED)	Capri Sonne–Campagnolo–Merckx	+ 9' 24"
5	Phil Anderson (AUS)	Peugeot–Shell–Michelin	+ 12' 16"
6	Beat Breu (SUI)	Cilo–Aufina	+ 13' 21"
7	Daniel Willems (BEL)	Sunair–Colnago–Campagnolo	+ 15' 33"
8	Raymond Martin (FRA)	COOP–Mercier–Mavic	+ 15' 35"
9	Hennie Kuiper (NED)	DAF Trucks–TeVe Blad	+ 17' 01"
10	Alberto Fernández (ESP)	Teka	+ 17' 19"

Final general classification (11–125)
Rank	Rider	Team	Time
11	Robert Alban (FRA)	La Redoute–Motobécane	+ 17' 21"
12	Bernard Vallet (FRA)	La Redoute–Motobécane	+ 19' 52"
13	Jean-René Bernaudeau (FRA)	Peugeot–Shell–Michelin	+ 20' 02"
14	Sven-Åke Nilsson (SWE)	Wolber–Spidel	+ 25' 11"
15	Sean Kelly (IRE)	Sem–France Loire–Campagnolo	+ 27' 17"
16	Charly Berard (FRA)	Renault–Elf–Gitane	+ 31' 35"
17	Kim Andersen (DEN)	COOP–Mercier–Mavic	+ 31' 57"
18	Jacques Michaud (FRA)	COOP–Mercier–Mavic	+ 32' 21"
19	Theo de Rooij (NED)	Capri Sonne–Campagnolo–Merckx	+ 32' 37"
20	Pascal Simon (FRA)	Peugeot–Shell–Michelin	+ 34' 22"
21	Stefan Mutter (SUI)	Puch–Eorotex–Campagnolo	+ 35' 02"
22	Guy Nulens (BEL)	DAF Trucks–TeVe Blad	+ 35' 48"
23	Jonathan Boyer (USA)	Sem–France Loire–Campagnolo	+ 44' 09"
24	René Martens (BEL)	DAF Trucks–TeVe Blad	+ 44' 28"
25	Lucien Didier (LUX)	Renault–Elf–Gitane	+ 44' 37"
26	Jean-François Rodriguez (FRA)	Renault–Elf–Gitane	+ 45' 31"
27	Maurice Le Guilloux (FRA)	Renault–Elf–Gitane	+ 46' 58"
28	Johan De Muynck (BEL)	La Redoute–Motobécane	+ 48' 51"
29	Christian Seznec (FRA)	Wolber–Spidel	+ 49' 28"
30	Marc Madiot (FRA)	Renault–Elf–Gitane	+ 49' 28"
31	Alfons De Wolf (BEL)	Vermeer Thijs	+ 50' 21"
32	Gerard Veldscholten (NED)	TI–Raleigh–Campagnolo	+ 51' 30"
33	Mario Beccia (ITA)	Hoonved–Bottecchia	+ 52' 35"
34	Ludo Peeters (BEL)	TI–Raleigh–Campagnolo	+ 52' 59"
35	Alain Vigneron (FRA)	Renault–Elf–Gitane	+ 53' 48"
36	Dominique Arnaud (FRA)	Wolber–Spidel	+ 54' 12"
37	Marino Lejarreta (ESP)	Teka	+ 54' 29"
38	Patrick Perret (FRA)	Peugeot–Shell–Michelin	+ 55' 05"
39	Pierre Bazzo (FRA)	La Redoute–Motobécane	+ 55' 30"
40	Adri van Houwelingen (NED)	Vermeer Thijs	+ 56' 43"
41	Patrick Bonnet (FRA)	Renault–Elf–Gitane	+ 57' 16"
42	Didier Vanoverschelde (FRA)	La Redoute–Motobécane	+ 1h 00' 00"
43	Marcel Tinazzi (FRA)	Sem–France Loire–Campagnolo	+ 1h 00' 33"
44	René Bittinger (FRA)	Sem–France Loire–Campagnolo	+ 1h 00' 53"
45	Régis Clère (FRA)	COOP–Mercier–Mavic	+ 1h 00' 55"
46	Henk Lubberding (NED)	TI–Raleigh–Campagnolo	+ 1h 02' 29"
47	Gerrie Knetemann (NED)	TI–Raleigh–Campagnolo	+ 1h 03' 41"
48	Michel Laurent (FRA)	Peugeot–Shell–Michelin	+ 1h 04' 58"
49	Jean-François Chaurin (FRA)	Sem–France Loire–Campagnolo	+ 1h 05' 57"
50	Pascal Poisson (FRA)	Renault–Elf–Gitane	+ 1h 08' 24"
51	Pierre-Henri Menthéour (FRA)	COOP–Mercier–Mavic	+ 1h 10' 47"
52	Leo van Vliet (NED)	TI–Raleigh–Campagnolo	+ 1h 12' 18"
53	Ad Wijnands (NED)	TI–Raleigh–Campagnolo	+ 1h 13' 22"
54	Jean-Philippe Vandenbrande (BEL)	Splendor–Wickes Bouwmarkt	+ 1h 14' 56"
55	Pierre-Raymond Villemiane (FRA)	Wolber–Spidel	+ 1h 15' 56"
56	Hubert Linard (FRA)	Peugeot–Shell–Michelin	+ 1h 17' 04"
57	Ismael Lejarreta (ESP)	Teka	+ 1h 20' 21"
58	Luciano Loro (ITA)	Inoxpran	+ 1h 22' 49"
59	Pierre Le Bigaut (FRA)	COOP–Mercier–Mavic	+ 1h 23' 00"
60	Gilbert Duclos-Lassalle (FRA)	Peugeot–Shell–Michelin	+ 1h 23' 04"
61	Ludo De Keulenaer (BEL)	TI–Raleigh–Campagnolo	+ 1h 24' 55"
62	Marc Durant (FRA)	Wolber–Spidel	+ 1h 27' 23"
63	Ronald De Witte (BEL)	Capri Sonne–Campagnolo–Merckx	+ 1h 27' 56"
64	Dominique Garde (FRA)	Sem–France Loire–Campagnolo	+ 1h 29' 14"
65	Antonio Ferretti (SUI)	Cilo–Aufina	+ 1h 30' 07"
66	Frédéric Brun (FRA)	Peugeot–Shell–Michelin	+ 1h 30' 56"
67	Bernardo Alfonsel (ESP)	Teka	+ 1h 31' 00"
68	Eric Van de Wiele (BEL)	Capri Sonne–Campagnolo–Merckx	+ 1h 31' 21"
69	Josef Wehrli (SUI)	Puch–Eorotex–Campagnolo	+ 1h 31' 21"
70	Antonio Coll (ESP)	Teka	+ 1h 32' 02"
71	Marc Gomez (FRA)	Wolber–Spidel	+ 1h 33' 00"
72	Serge Demierre (SUI)	Cilo–Aufina	+ 1h 33' 56"
73	Rudy Pevenage (BEL)	Capri Sonne–Campagnolo–Merckx	+ 1h 35' 23"
74	Jean-François Rault (FRA)	Wolber–Spidel	+ 1h 41' 55"
75	Ludwig Wijnants (BEL)	Sunair–Colnago–Campagnolo	+ 1h 42' 19"
76	Bruno Leali (ITA)	Inoxpran	+ 1h 42' 50"
77	Patrick Clerc (FRA)	Sem–France Loire–Campagnolo	+ 1h 43' 05"
78	Harald Maier (AUT)	Puch–Eorotex–Campagnolo	+ 1h 43' 50"
79	Mike Gutmann (SUI)	Puch–Eorotex–Campagnolo	+ 1h 43' 58"
80	Jean Chassang (FRA)	Wolber–Spidel	+ 1h 44' 21"
81	Pol Verschuere (BEL)	Vermeer Thijs	+ 1h 46' 49"
82	Cédric Rossier (SUI)	Cilo–Aufina	+ 1h 47' 08"
83	Patrick Moerlen (SUI)	Cilo–Aufina	+ 1h 48' 07"
84	Dany Schoonbaert (BEL)	Vermeer Thijs	+ 1h 48' 57"
85	Marc Dierickx (BEL)	DAF Trucks–TeVe Blad	+ 1h 51' 17"
86	Hubert Arbès (FRA)	Renault–Elf–Gitane	+ 1h 52' 06"
87	Eric McKenzie (NZL)	Capri Sonne–Campagnolo–Merckx	+ 1h 54' 31"
88	Hendrik Devos (BEL)	DAF Trucks–TeVe Blad	+ 1h 54' 39"
89	Claude Vincendeau (FRA)	Wolber–Spidel	+ 1h 56' 33"
90	Klaus-Peter Thaler (FRG)	Puch–Eorotex–Campagnolo	+ 1h 56' 42"
91	Ludo Delcroix (BEL)	Capri Sonne–Campagnolo–Merckx	+ 1h 58' 36"
92	Louis Luyten (BEL)	Vermeer Thijs	+ 1h 59' 27"
93	Roger De Cnijf (BEL)	Vermeer Thijs	+ 1h 59' 58"
94	Patrick Versluys (BEL)	Sunair–Colnago–Campagnolo	+ 2h 05' 33"
95	Erwin Lienhard (SUI)	Puch–Eorotex–Campagnolo	+ 2h 07' 51"
96	Pascal Guyot (FRA)	La Redoute–Motobécane	+ 2h 09' 00"
97	Eugène Urbany (LUX)	Splendor–Wickes Bouwmarkt	+ 2h 09' 15"
98	Julius Thalmann (SUI)	Cilo–Aufina	+ 2h 10' 46"
99	Jan van Houwelingen (NED)	Vermeer Thijs	+ 2h 11' 19"
100	Marcel Laurens (BEL)	DAF Trucks–TeVe Blad	+ 2h 11' 51"
101	Guy Janiszewski (BEL)	Sunair–Colnago–Campagnolo	+ 2h 13' 13"
102	Adri van der Poel (NED)	DAF Trucks–TeVe Blad	+ 2h 14' 42"
103	Siegfried Hekimi (SUI)	Puch–Eorotex–Campagnolo	+ 2h 15' 00"
104	Jean-Louis Gauthier (FRA)	COOP–Mercier–Mavic	+ 2h 15' 33"
105	Gilbert Glaus (SUI)	Cilo–Aufina	+ 2h 15' 35"
106	Antonio Bevilacqua (ITA)	Hoonved–Bottecchia	+ 2h 15' 58"
107	Hubert Graignic (FRA)	Sem–France Loire–Campagnolo	+ 2h 17' 01"
108	Frans Van Vlierberghe (BEL)	Sunair–Colnago–Campagnolo	+ 2h 18' 07"
109	Alfredo Chinetti (ITA)	Inoxpran	+ 2h 19' 26"
110	Felipe Yañez (ESP)	Teka	+ 2h 22' 13"
111	Paul Sherwen (GBR)	La Redoute–Motobécane	+ 2h 22' 54"
112	Thierry Bolle (SUI)	Cilo–Aufina	+ 2h 26' 41"
113	Fiorenzo Aliverti (ITA)	Hoonved–Bottecchia	+ 2h 27' 34"
114	André Chappuis (FRA)	Sem–France Loire–Campagnolo	+ 2h 28' 19"
115	André Chalmel (FRA)	Peugeot–Shell–Michelin	+ 2h 33' 49"
116	Carlo Tonon (ITA)	Inoxpran	+ 2h 34' 33"
117	Dirk Wayenberg (BEL)	Capri Sonne–Campagnolo–Merckx	+ 2h 38' 22"
118	Benny Van Brabant (BEL)	Splendor–Wickes Bouwmarkt	+ 2h 38' 57"
119	Marcel Russenberger (SUI)	Cilo–Aufina	+ 2h 39' 32"
120	Giuliano Biatta (ITA)	Inoxpran	+ 2h 45' 10"
121	Enzo Serpelloni (ITA)	Hoonved–Bottecchia	+ 2h 46' 18"
122	Juan-Carlos Alonso (ESP)	Teka	+ 2h 51' 22"
123	Alain De Roo (BEL)	Sunair–Colnago–Campagnolo	+ 2h 51' 38"
124	Yvon Bertin (FRA)	COOP–Mercier–Mavic	+ 2h 55' 28"
125	Werner Devos (BEL)	Sunair–Colnago–Campagnolo	+ 3h 04' 44"

=== Points classification ===
Final points classification (1–10)
Rank	Rider	Team	Points
1	Sean Kelly (IRE)	Sem–France Loire–Campagnolo	429
2	Bernard Hinault (FRA)	Renault–Elf–Gitane	152
3	Phil Anderson (AUS)	Peugeot–Shell–Michelin	149
4	Daniel Willems (BEL)	Sunair–Colnago–Campagnolo	143
5	Stefan Mutter (SUI)	Puch–Eorotex–Campagnolo	127
6	Pierre-Raymond Villemiane (FRA)	Wolber–Spidel	123
7	Adri van Houwelingen (NED)	Vermeer Thijs	103
8	Johan van der Velde (NED)	TI–Raleigh–Campagnolo	97
9	Leo van Vliet (NED)	TI–Raleigh–Campagnolo	80
10	Bernard Vallet (FRA)	La Redoute–Motobécane	74

=== Mountains classification ===
Final mountains classification (1–10)
Rank	Rider	Team	Points
1	Bernard Vallet (FRA)	La Redoute–Motobécane	278
2	Jean-René Bernaudeau (FRA)	Peugeot–Shell–Michelin	237
3	Beat Breu (SUI)	Cilo–Aufina	205
4	Bernard Hinault (FRA)	Renault–Elf–Gitane	141
5	Peter Winnen (NED)	Capri Sonne–Campagnolo–Merckx	113
6	Pascal Simon (FRA)	Peugeot–Shell–Michelin	112
7	Robert Alban (FRA)	La Redoute–Motobécane	103
8	Marino Lejarreta (ESP)	Teka	86
9	Raymond Martin (FRA)	COOP–Mercier–Mavic	86
10	Pierre-Henri Menthéour (FRA)	COOP–Mercier–Mavic	82

=== Young rider classification ===
Final young rider classification (1–10)
Rank	Rider	Team	Time
1	Phil Anderson (AUS)	Peugeot–Shell–Michelin	+ 92h 12' 02"
2	Kim Andersen (DEN)	COOP–Mercier–Mavic	+ 19' 41"
3	Marc Madiot (FRA)	Renault–Elf–Gitane	+ 37' 12"
4	Gerard Veldscholten (NED)	TI–Raleigh–Campagnolo	+ 39' 14"
5	Jean-François Chaurin (FRA)	Sem–France Loire–Campagnolo	+ 53' 41"
6	Pascal Poisson (FRA)	Renault–Elf–Gitane	+ 56' 08"
7	Pierre-Henri Menthéour (FRA)	COOP–Mercier–Mavic	+ 58' 31"
8	Ad Wijnands (NED)	TI–Raleigh–Campagnolo	+ 1h 01' 06"
9	Pierre Le Bigaut (FRA)	COOP–Mercier–Mavic	+ 1h 10' 44"
10	Ludo De Keulenaer (BEL)	TI–Raleigh–Campagnolo	+ 1h 12' 39"

=== Combination classification ===
Final combination classification (1–10)
Rank	Rider	Team	Points
1	Bernard Hinault (FRA)	Renault–Elf–Gitane	11
2	Sean Kelly (IRE)	Sem–France Loire–Campagnolo	5
3	Bernard Vallet (FRA)	La Redoute–Motobécane	5
4	Phil Anderson (AUS)	Peugeot–Shell–Michelin	4
5	Beat Breu (SUI)	Cilo–Aufina	4
6	Joop Zoetemelk (NED)	COOP–Mercier–Mavic	4
7	Jean-René Bernaudeau (FRA)	Peugeot–Shell–Michelin	3
8	Johan van der Velde (NED)	TI–Raleigh–Campagnolo	3
9	Peter Winnen (NED)	Capri Sonne–Campagnolo–Merckx	3
10	Daniel Willems (BEL)	Sunair–Colnago–Campagnolo	2

=== Intermediate sprints classification ===
Final intermediate sprints classification (1–10)
Rank	Rider	Team	Points
1	Sean Kelly (IRE)	Sem–France Loire–Campagnolo	187
2	Phil Anderson (AUS)	Peugeot–Shell–Michelin	87
3	Daniel Willems (BEL)	Sunair–Colnago–Campagnolo	80
4	Pierre-Henri Menthéour (FRA)	COOP–Mercier–Mavic	62
5	Bernard Hinault (FRA)	Renault–Elf–Gitane	58
6	Régis Clère (FRA)	COOP–Mercier–Mavic	40
7	Hennie Kuiper (NED)	DAF Trucks–TeVe Blad	35
8	Pierre-Raymond Villemiane (FRA)	Wolber–Spidel	33
9	Adri van Houwelingen (NED)	Vermeer Thijs	32
10	Jacques Michaud (FRA)	COOP–Mercier–Mavic	32

=== Team classification ===
Final team classification (1–10)
Rank	Team	Time
1	COOP–Mercier–Mavic	377h 25' 33"
2	Renault–Elf–Gitane	+ 14' 01"
3	Peugeot–Shell–Michelin	+ 26' 46"
4	TI–Raleigh–Campagnolo	+ 55' 33"
5	La Redoute–Motobécane	+ 1h 15' 21"
6	Capri Sonne–Campagnolo–Merckx	+ 1h 43' 41"
7	DAF Trucks–TeVe Blad	+1h 52' 51"
8	Sem–France Loire–Campagnolo	+1h 53' 57"
9	Wolber–Spidel	+2h 03' 07"
10	Teka	+2h 55' 54"

=== Team points classification ===
Final team points classification (1–5)
Rank	Team	Points
1	TI–Raleigh–Campagnolo	884
2	COOP–Mercier–Mavic	1253
3	Capri Sonne–Campagnolo–Merckx	1323
4	Peugeot–Shell–Michelin	1352
5	La Redoute–Motobécane	1482
6	Renault–Elf–Gitane	1529
7	Wolber–Spidel	1535
8	Sem–France Loire–Campagnolo	1799
9	DAF Trucks–TeVe Blad	1869
10	Vermeer Thijs	2282

== Aftermath ==
Hinault's victory in 1982 is considered as the most effortless Tour victory in his career.

During the 1982 Tour de France, the Tour organisation was impressed by the global audience that the 1982 FIFA World Cup reached, and they made plans to develop the Tour into a World Cup format, run every four years, where teams from all over the earth would compete against each other. The main part of the race would be in France, but more other countries would be visited; it was discussed to start the Tour in New York.

The 1983 Tour de France was still run in the familiar format in France, but it was open to amateur teams, although only one Colombian accepted the invitation.

== Bibliography ==
- Augendre, Jacques (2016). Guide historique [Historical guide] (PDF) (in French). Paris: Amaury Sport Organisation. Archived (PDF) from the original on 17 August 2016.
- Dauncey, Hugh; Hare, Geoff (2003). The Tour de France, 1903–2003: A Century of Sporting Structures, Meanings and Values. London: Frank Cass & Co. ISBN 978-0-203-50241-9.
- Martin, Pierre; Penazzo, Sergio; Schamps, Daniel; Vos, Cor (1982). Tour 82: The Stories of the 1982 Tour of Italy and Tour de France. Keighley, UK: Kennedy Brothers Publishing. OCLC 67664372.
- McGann, Bill; McGann, Carol (2008). The Story of the Tour de France: 1965–2007. Vol. 2. Indianapolis: Dog Ear Publishing. ISBN 978-1-59858-608-4.
- Nauright, John; Parrish, Charles (2012). Sports Around the World: History, Culture, and Practice. Vol. 2. Santa Barbara, California: ABC-CLIO. ISBN 978-1-59884-300-2.
- van den Akker, Pieter (2018). Tour de France Rules and Statistics: 1903–2018. Self-published. ISBN 978-1-79398-080-9.
