= Orcières-Merlette =

Ski resort in the French Alps

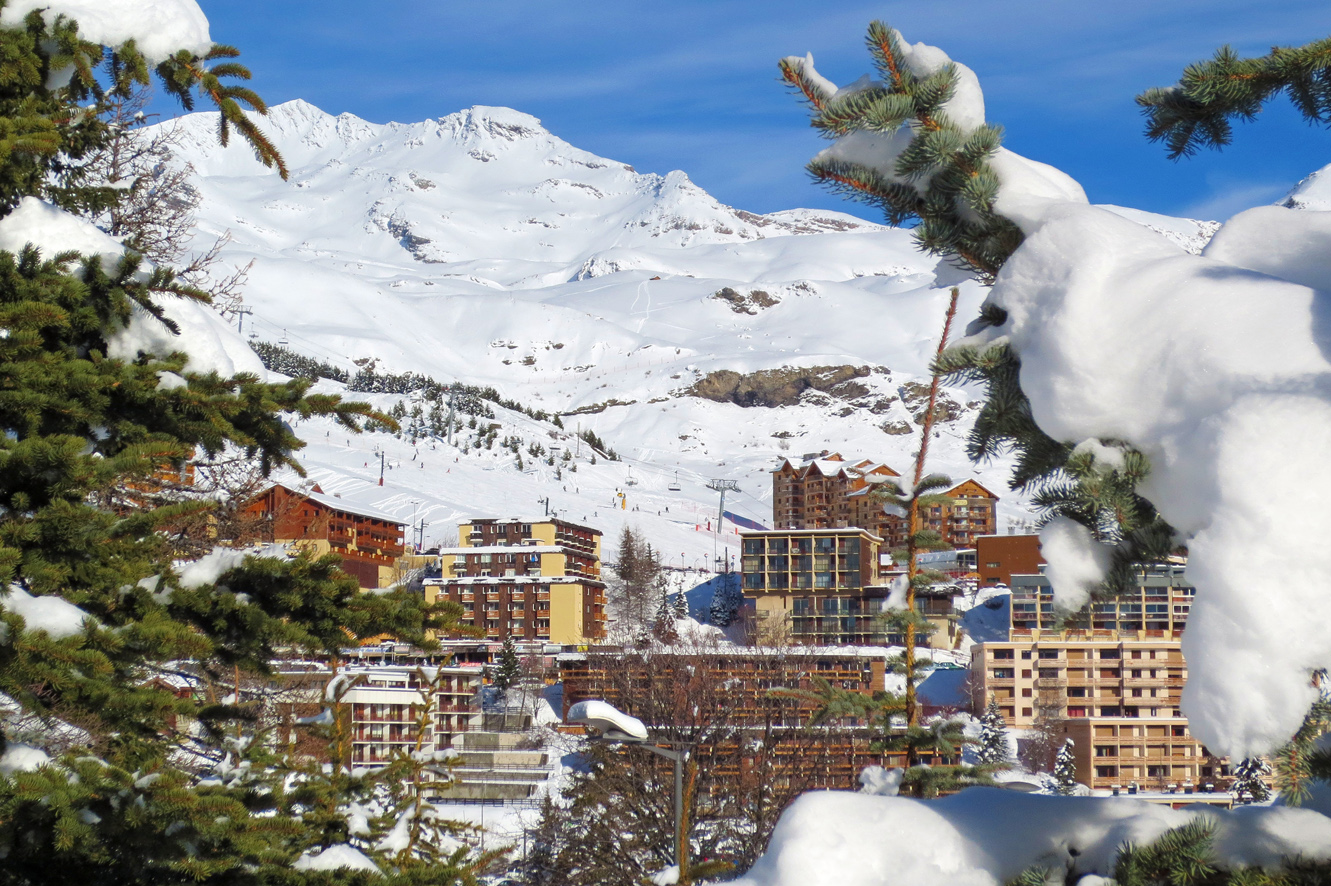
- Orcières-Merlette in 2013

- Location within France
- Location: French Alps
- Nearest city: Gap
- Coordinates: 44.697°N 6.322°E
- Top elevation: 2,727 m (8,947 ft)
- Base elevation: 1,850 m (6,070 ft)
- Skiable area: 607 ha (1,500 acres)
- Trails: 51
- Longest run: 8 km (5.0 mi)
- Total length: 100 km (62 mi)
- Snowfall: 500 centimetres (200 in)
- Website: orcieres.com

Orcières-Merlette (French pronunciation: [ɔʁsjɛʁ mɛʁlɛt]), also known as Orcières Merlette 1850, is a ski resort near to Orcières, Hautes-Alpes, in the French Alps. It has been a summit finish for Tour de France stages on multiple occasions, most notably in 1971, when Luis Ocaña beat Eddy Merckx by over eight minutes to take the yellow jersey as leader of the general classification.

== Location and resort details ==
Orcières-Merlette is situated in the French Alps, around 5 km (3.1 mi) from the village of Orcières, on the edge of the Écrins National Park. It lies above the town of Gap. The highest point of the resort is Col de Freissinières at 2,727 m (8,947 ft) above sea level.

Orcières-Merlette covers an area of 16,000 m^{2} (170,000 ft^{2}). The resort has 30 ski lifts and 51 pistes, totalling over 100 km (62 mi) in length. Orcières-Merlette contains one of Europe's longest zip lines, with a length of 1,870 m (6,140 ft) from Le Drouvet to Lac d'Orcières-Merlette.

== History ==
Orcières-Merlette was built in the 1960s, and opened in 1962. Since the early 2000s, the resort has been owned by Labellemontagne. Skiers who have used Orcières-Merlette as their home location include Valentin Giraud Moine and Alizée Baron. French rally driver Sébastien Ogier has also worked as a ski instructor at Orcières-Merlette.

In 2019, Orcières-Merlette hosted a "colour" skiing event, which involved being sprayed with coloured powders whilst skiing down the mountain. A 2020 Alpine Skiing Europa Cup Super-G event scheduled to be held at Orcières-Merlette was cancelled due to heavy snowfall and lack of visibility.

== Tour de France ==
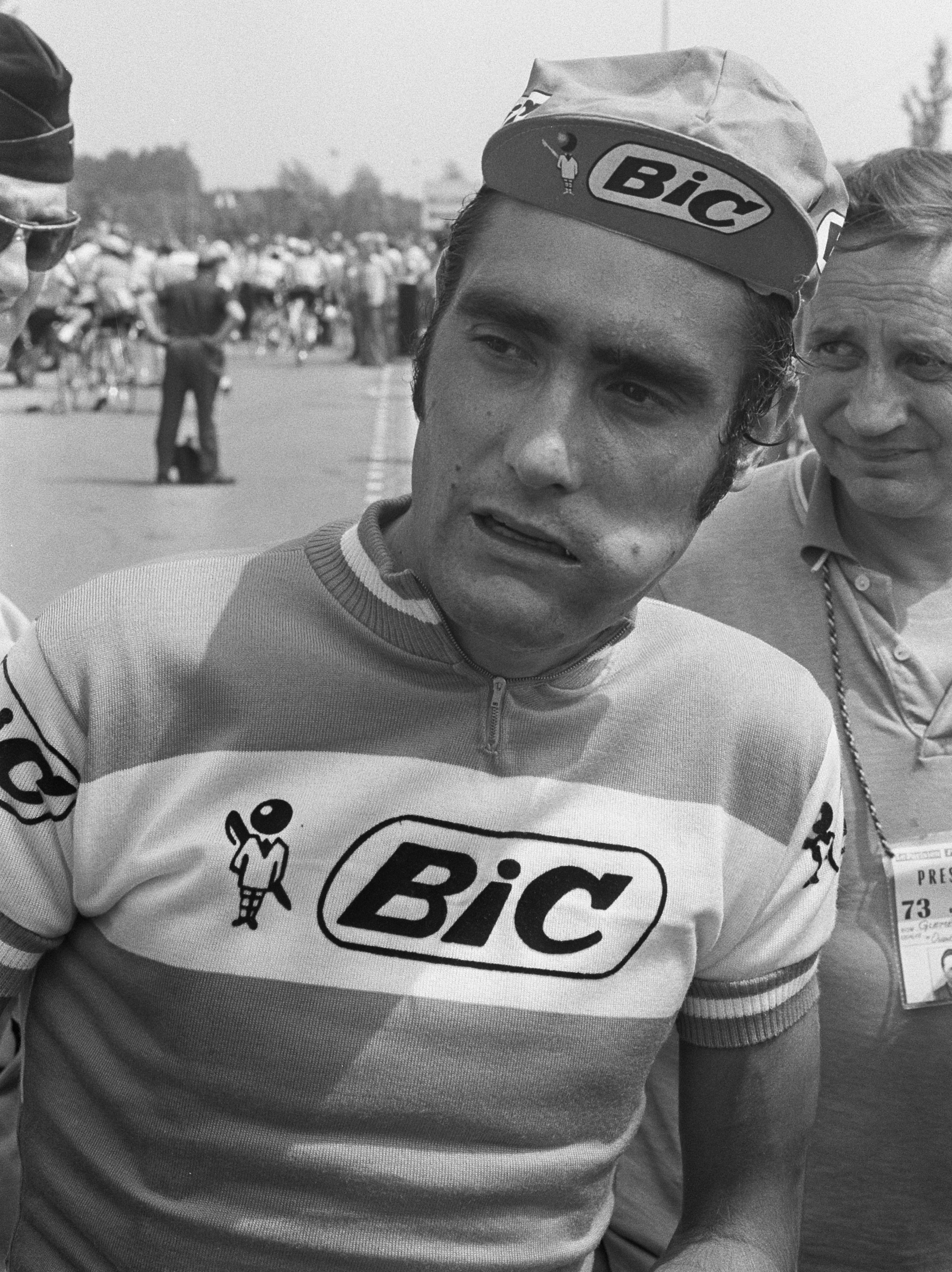
Luis Ocaña won the 1971 Tour de France stage that finished at Orcières-Merlette.

Orcières-Merlette was first used as a Tour de France stage host in 1971 edition, when it was used for the finish of stage 11 and the start of stage 12, including the rest day in between the stages. Luis Ocaña won stage 11, attacking from a group of leading contenders and soloing for the final 60 km (37 mi). He also gained the yellow jersey as leader of the general classification with a finishing margin of 8:42 minutes over the former leader Eddy Merckx. Merckx had won the previous year's race. Following the rest day, stage 12 of the 1971 Tour started with a descent from Orcières-Merlette, which Merckx attacked on with a small group and remained in the lead to the finish in Marseille. Ocaña led the chasing peloton (main field) to limit his loss to Merckx on the stage to two minutes. The leading group broke the record for the fastest average speed of a mass-start Tour de France stage at 45.351 km/h (28.180 mph).

The Tour returned to Orcières-Merlette the following year when it was again used across a rest day. Lucien Van Impe took victory at Orcières-Merlette in the initial stage 11. The next time Orcières-Merlette was visited by the Tour was ten years later in 1982, when it was used for the finish of stage 15, won by Pascal Simon, before hosting the start of the next stage.

Orcières-Merlette featured in the 1989 Tour as the finish of stage 15's individual time trial, which was won by Steven Rooks. The yellow jersey was taken by Greg LeMond, in a Tour considered to be one of the greatest in the race's history. The stage also included an ascent of the Col de Manse mountain pass, which stands between Gap and Orcières-Merlette.

Orcières-Merlette was the summit finish of stage 4 of the 2020 Tour, the first time that the race had ascended the mountain in 31 years. The ascent was 7.1 km (4.4 mi) long, with an average gradient of 6.5%. The climb had a reasonably consistent gradient, and features many hairpin turns. It was one of two summit finishes on the first week of the Tour, the other being Mont Aigoual. The stage was won by Slovenian Primož Roglič in a sprint finish.

Orcières-Merlette was the summit finish of stage 18 of the 2026 tour, with Richard Carapaz winning the stage.

== Bibliography ==
- Augendre, Jacques (2019). Guide historique [Historical guide] (PDF) (in French). Paris: Amaury Sport Organisation. Archived (PDF) from the original on 13 September 2019.
- Fotheringham, William (2012). Merckx: Half Man, Half Bike. London: Yellow Jersey Press. ISBN 978-0-224-07451-3.
- Woodland, Les (2007). Yellow Jersey Companion to the Tour de France. London: Yellow Jersey Press. ISBN 978-0-224-08016-3.
