= Lac des Estaris =

Lake in France

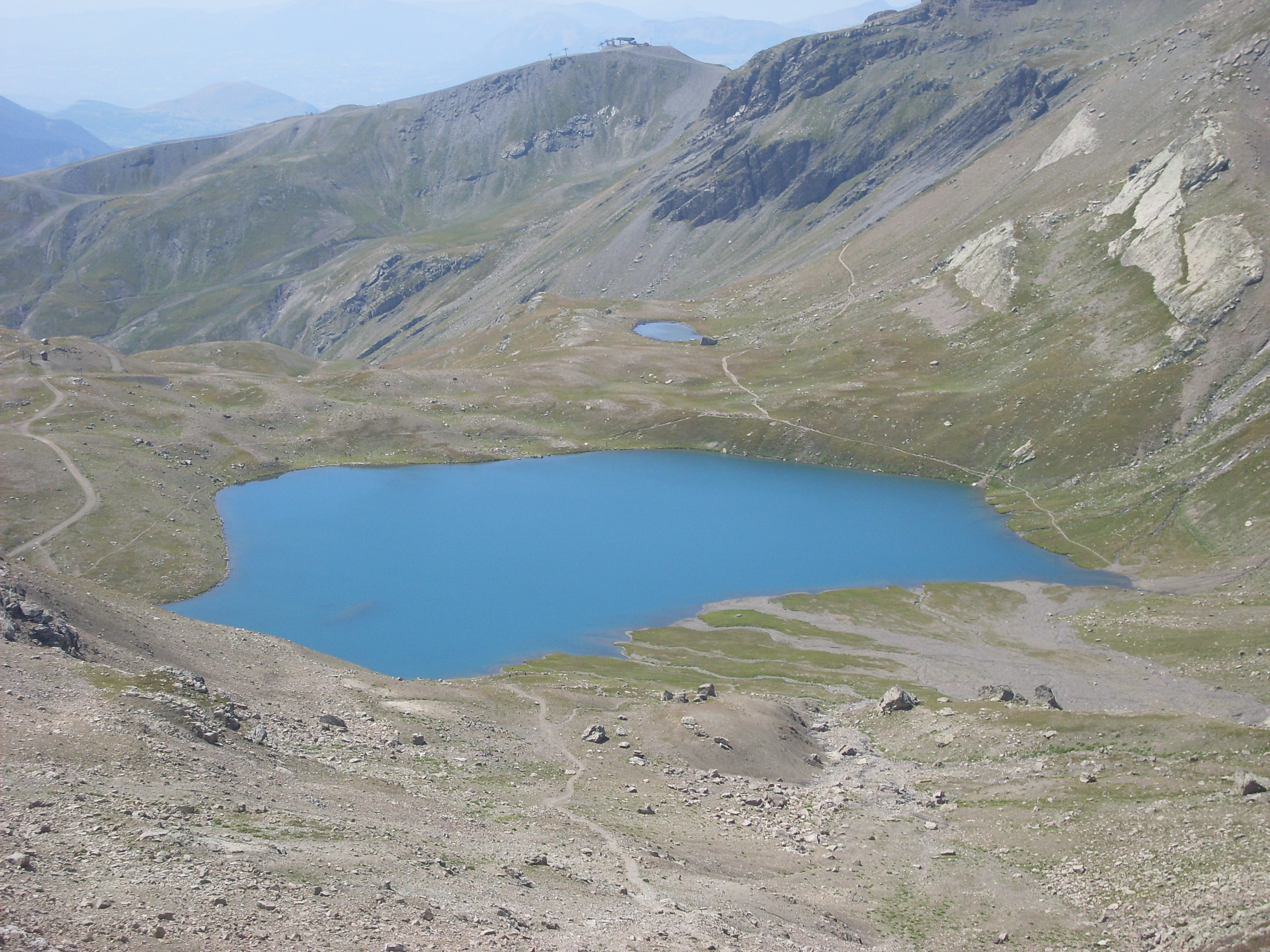

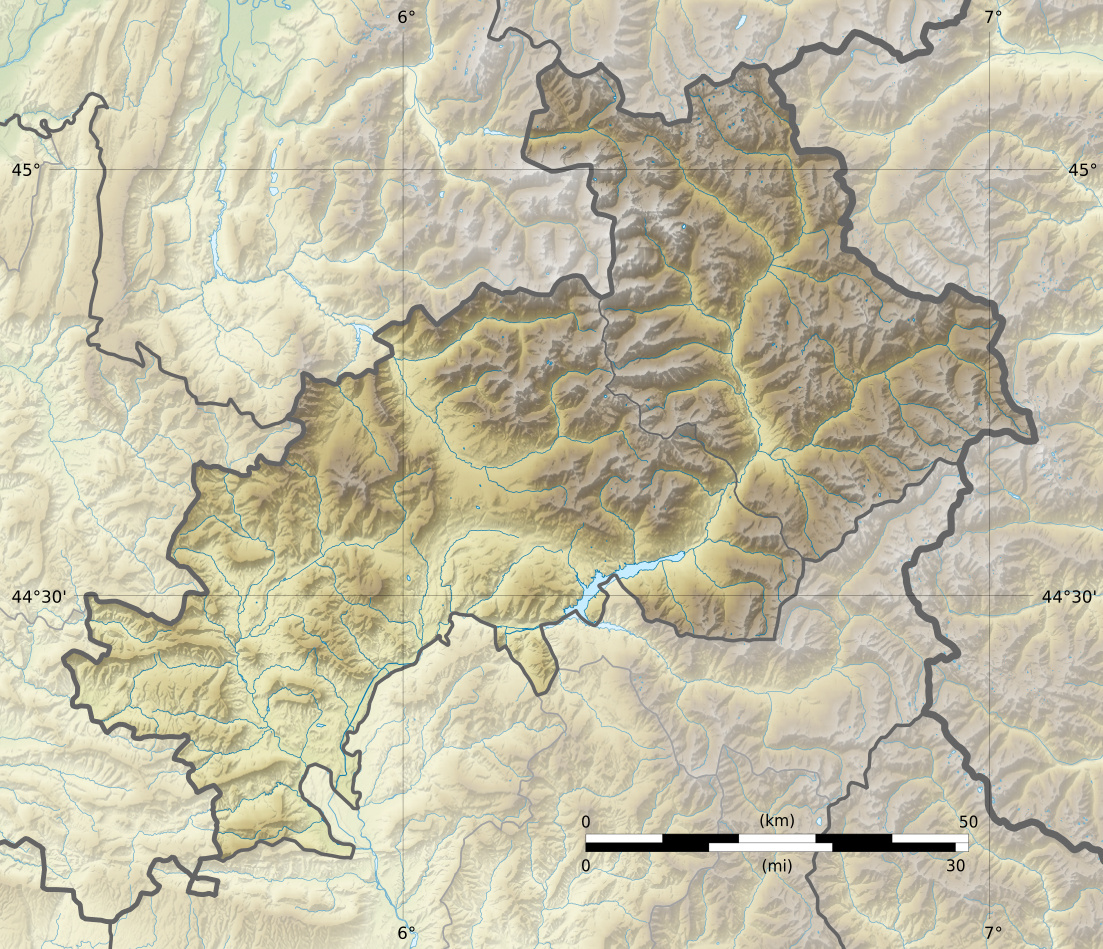
- Location within Hautes-Alpes
- Location: Orcières, Hautes-Alpes
- Coordinates: 44°43′57″N 6°20′38″E
- Primary outflows: Drac
- Basin countries: France
- Water volume: 403,000 m^{3} (14,200,000 cu ft)
- Surface elevation: 2,560 m (8,400 ft)

Lac des Estaris is a lake in Orcières, Hautes-Alpes, France.
