= Lac d'Orcières-Merlette =

Lake in Orcières, France

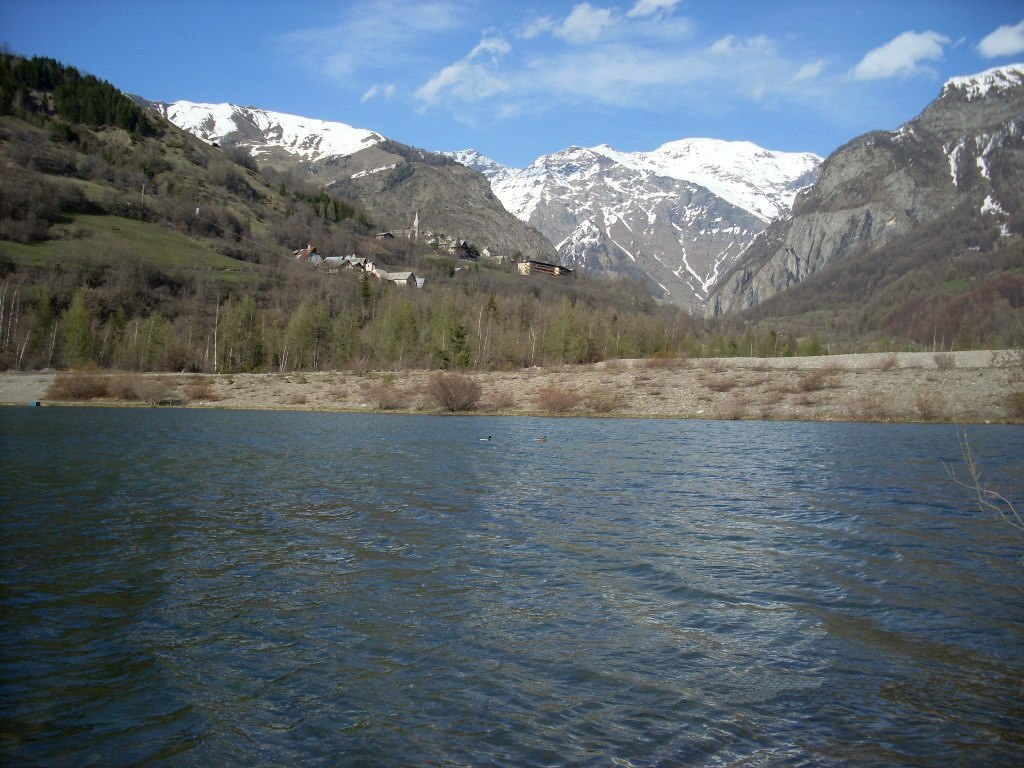

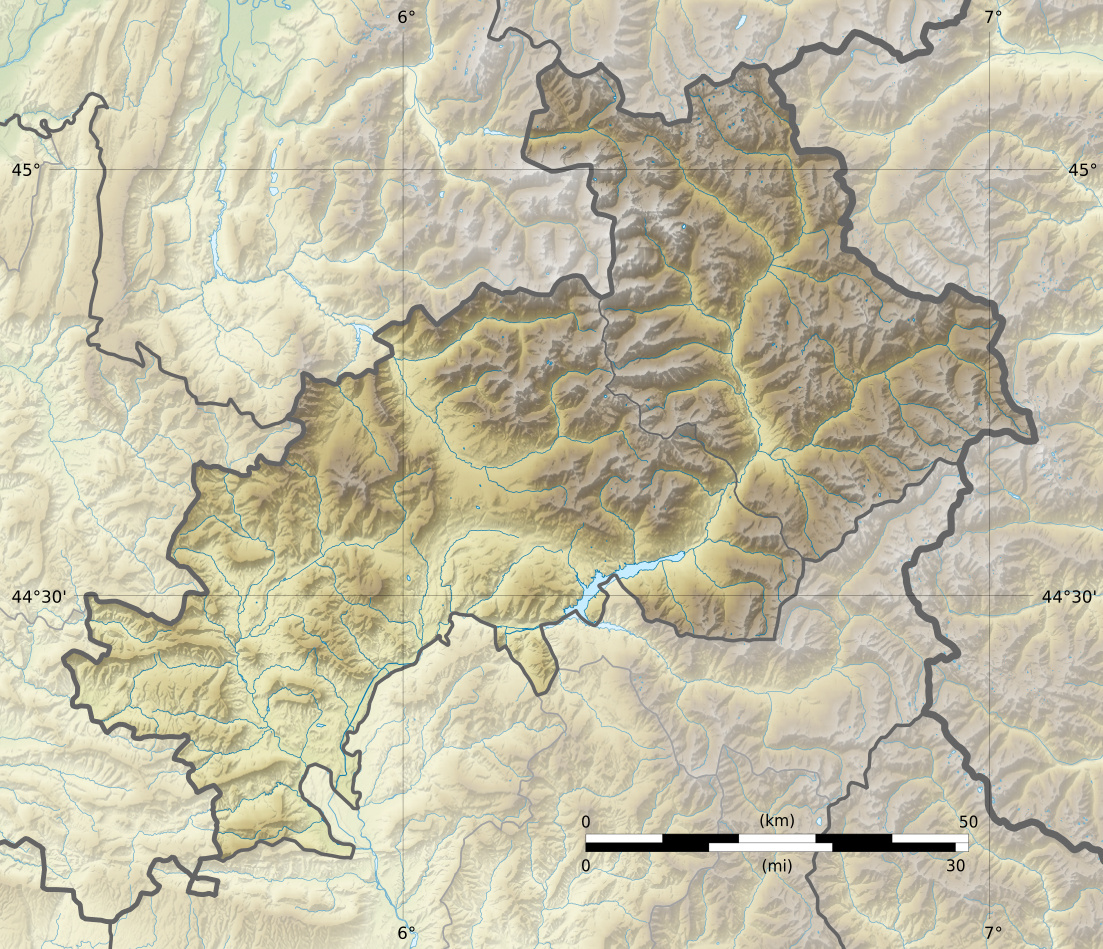
- Location within Hautes-Alpes
- Location: Hautes-Alpes
- Coordinates: 44°40′47″N 6°18′42″E
- Type: artificial
- Primary outflows: Drac noir
- Basin countries: France
- Max. depth: 4 m (13 ft)
- Shore length^{1}: 634 m (2,080 ft)
- Surface elevation: 1,285 m (4,216 ft)
- Islands: 1
- ^{1} Shore length is not a well-defined measure.

Lac d'Orcières-Merlette is an artificial lake in Orcières, Hautes-Alpes, France. It is fed by the river Drac. Various leisure activities are offered there, including:

- trout fishing
- pedal boating
- canoeing
- hiking
