= Mike Gutmann =

Swiss cyclist

Personal information
- Born: 28 April 1962 (age 64) Jongny, Switzerland

Cycling career
- Sport: Cycling
- Role: Rider

Mike Gutmann (born 28 April 1962) is a Swiss former professional racing cyclist. He rode in the 1982 Tour de France.
