= Jean-François Chaurin =

French cyclist

Personal information
- Born: 23 October 1961 (age 64) Savigny-sur-Orge, France

Cycling career
- Sport: Cycling
- Role: Rider

Jean-François Chaurin (born 23 October 1961) is a French former professional racing cyclist. He rode in two editions of the Tour de France.
