= Ludo Peeters =

Belgian cyclist

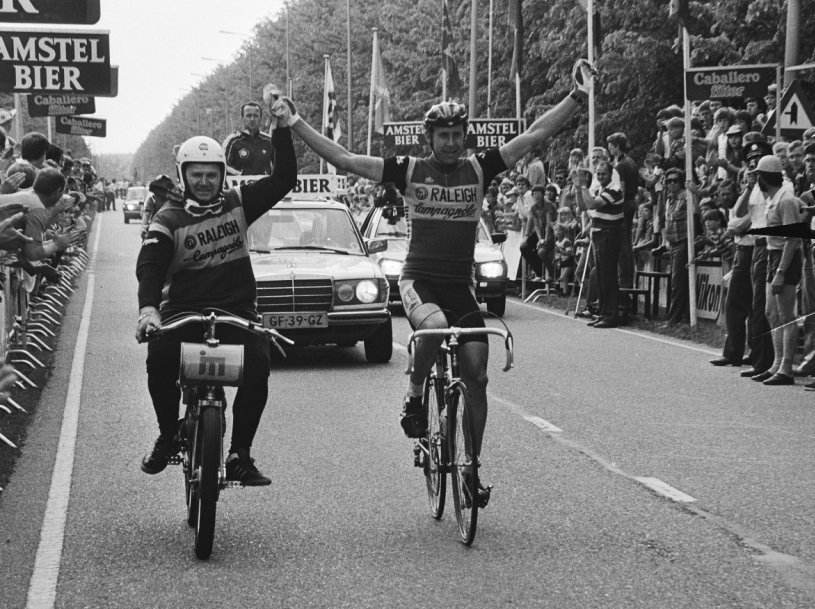
- Peeters in 1982

Personal information
- Born: 9 August 1953 (age 73) Hoogstraten, Belgium

Cycling career
- Sport: Cycling
- Current team: Retired
- Discipline: Road
- Role: Rider

Professional teams
- 1974–1980: IJsboerke–Colner
- 1981–1983: TI–Raleigh
- 1984–1988: Superconfex–Yoko–Opel–Colnago
- 1989: Caja Rural
- 1990: Stuttgart–Mercedes–Merckx–Puma

Major wins
- Three stages Tour de France; Paris–Brussels (1977, 1979)

Ludo Peeters (born 9 August 1953) is a former Belgian professional road bicycle racer. He was professional from 1974 to 1990. He rode ten editions of the Tour de France and won 3 stages, one in 1980, one in 1982 and one in 1986. He also wore the yellow jersey as leader of the general classification for one day in 1982 after his stage win and also in 1984.

== Major results ==
1974
1st Stage 10 Tour de Pologne
1975
2nd Grand Prix de Fourmies
3rd Nationale Sluitingsprijs
1976
1st Omloop van de Vlaamse Scheldeboorden
2nd Overall Tour of the Netherlands
1977
1st Paris–Brussels
1st Overall Omloop Mandel-Leie-Schelde

1st Stage 1

1st Stage 4 Tour of the Netherlands
1st Prologue Grand Prix du Midi Libre
1st Stage 1 Tour de l'Aude
2nd Scheldeprijs
3rd Omloop Het Volk
1978
1st Schaal Sels
1st Overall Tour de Luxembourg
3rd Brabantse Pijl
1979
1st Paris–Brussels
1st Druivenkoers Overijse
1st Omloop Mandel-Leie-Schelde
1980
1st Scheldeprijs
1st Omloop van het Leiedal
1st Stage 9 Tour de Suisse
1st Stage 4b Tour of Belgium
2nd Giro della Romagna
2nd Grote Prijs Stad Zottegem
2nd Trofeo Baracchi
2nd Kuurne–Brussels–Kuurne
8th Overall Tour de France

1st Stage 14
1st combination classification

9th Paris–Roubaix
1981
1st Omloop van het Leiedal
1st Stage 2 Tour de Romandie
1st Stage 7b Volta a Catalunya
3rd Grand Prix du Midi Libre
1982
1st Rund um den Henninger Turm
Tour de France

1st stage 1
Held for one stage

1st Stages 3 & 6 Volta a Catalunya
8th Paris–Roubaix
1983
1st Rund um den Henninger Turm
1st Paris–Tours
1st Grote Prijs Raymond Impanis
1st Dwars door West-Vlaanderen
1st Stages 2 & 4 Volta a Catalunya
1st Stage 4 Setmana Catalana de Ciclisme
1st Stage 2 Étoile de Bessèges
3rd Giro del Lazio
1984
1st Scheldeprijs
Tour de France

Held for one stage

1985
1st Overall Tour of Belgium

1st Stage 1

1st Zürich-Metzgete
1st Paris–Tours
1st Stage 2 Tour de l'Aude
1986
1st Stage 7 Tour de France
1987
1st Kuurne–Brussels–Kuurne
1989
1st Omloop van het Leiedal
