= Pierre-Henri Menthéour =

French cyclist (1960–2014)

Personal information
- Full name: Pierre-Henri Menthéour
- Born: 9 May 1960 Algiers, French Algeria (now Algeria)
- Died: 12 April 2014 (aged 53) Brest, France

Cycling career
- Sport: Cycling
- Discipline: Road
- Role: Rider

Professional teams
- 1981: Miko–Mercier
- 1982–1983: Coop–Mercier
- 1984: Renault–Elf–Gitane
- 1985: La Redoute
- 1986: Miko–Carlos–Février–Tönissteiner

Major wins
- 1 stage 1984 Tour de France

Pierre-Henri Menthéour (9 May 1960 – 12 April 2014) was a French professional road bicycle racer.

Menthéour was born in Algiers. His brother Erwann was also a racing cyclist.

He won one stage in the 1984 Tour de France as well as the final Team Classification with Renault–Elf–Gitane. His teammate Laurent Fignon won that Tour. He retired in 1986, but returned to competition at the age 36 in order to attempt to break the Hour record of France.

In 2012 he admitted to doping during his career.

He went on to enjoy success as a journalist and TV cameraman, working on Eurosport's Tour de France coverage but also working in other areas, and won an award for a 2008 documentary on Afghanistan which he made for the French TV series Envoyé spécial.

== Death ==
On 12 April 2014 Pierre-Henri Menthéour died of cancer.

== Career achievements ==
=== Major results ===
1984
Concarneau
Tour de France:

Winner stage 13

1992
Tour du Finistère

=== Grand Tour general classification results timeline ===
Grand Tour	1982	1983	1984
Giro d'Italia	—	—	DNF
Tour de France	51	—	55
Vuelta a España	—	—	—
