= Bernard Vallet =

French cyclist (born 1954)

Personal information
- Full name: Bernard Vallet
- Born: 18 January 1954 (age 72) Vienne, Isère, France

Cycling career
- Sport: Cycling
- Discipline: Road
- Role: Rider

Professional teams
- 1976: Gan-Mercier
- 1977–1978: Miko-Mercier
- 1979–1983: La Redoute-Motobécane
- 1984–1985: La Vie Claire
- 1986–1987: R.M.O.

Major wins
- Bordeaux-Paris (1987); Tour de France, 1 stage King of the Mountains, Tour de France (1982)

Bernard Vallet (French pronunciation: [bɛʁnaʁ valɛ]; born 18 January 1954) is a French former road bicycle racer who won the mountains classification in the 1982 Tour de France.

From 2003 to 2011, Bernard Vallet was the analyst of the Tour de France on Canal Evasion with the two sports commentator Richard Garneau and Louis Bertrand. Moreover, he is the analyst for the Quebec broadcasting of Grand Prix Cycliste de Montréal et Grand Prix Cycliste de Québec since the first edition.

== Major results ==
1968
France National Amateur Road Race Championship
1977
Mende
1979
Tour du Limousin
1980
GP de la Ville de Rennes
Mende
Niort
Six Days of Nouméa (with Maurizio Bidinost)
Tour de France:

Winner stage 15

1981
Arras
Circuit des genêts verts
Maël-Pestivien
Tour d'Armorique
1982
Bain-de-Bretagne
Chamalières
Six-Days of Grenoble (with Gert Frank)
Lescouet-Jugon
Ronde Aude
Tour de France:

Winner mountains classification

1984
Camors
Six-Days of Grenoble (with Gert Frank)
France National Track Points Race Championship
Six Days of Paris (with Gert Frank)
1985
Clermont-Ferrand
Marthon
1986
Bussières
Six Days of Paris (with Danny Clark)
Poitiers
1987
Joué-les-Tours
Bordeaux–Paris
Les Ormes
Castillon-la-Bataille
Six-Days of Grenoble (with Charly Mottet)
