= Orcières =

- Commune
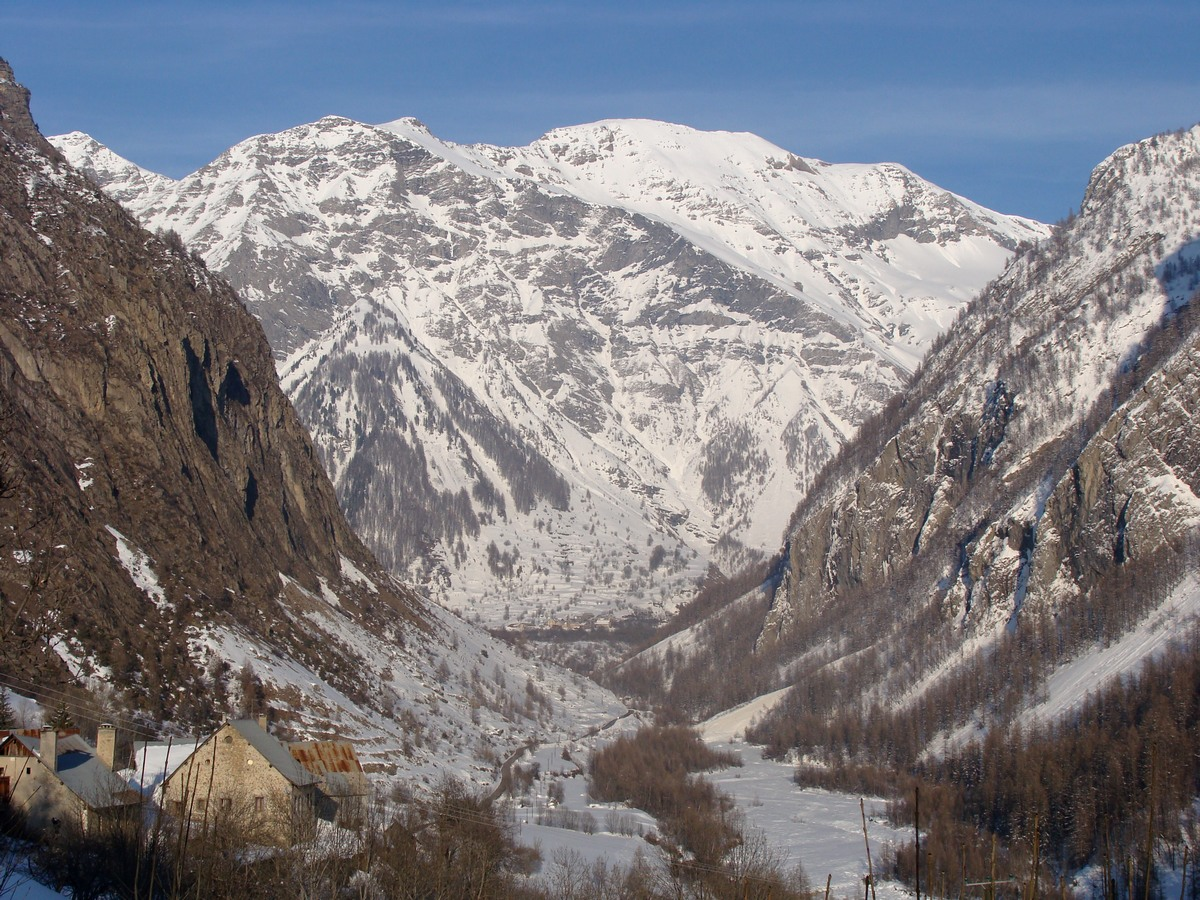
- Valley of Prapic

- Coat of arms
- Location of Orcières
- Location within France Location within Provence-Alpes-Côte d'Azur
- Coordinates: 44°41′07″N 6°19′33″E
- Country: France
- Region: Provence-Alpes-Côte d'Azur
- Department: Hautes-Alpes
- Arrondissement: Gap
- Canton: Saint-Bonnet-en-Champsaur
- Intercommunality: Champsaur-Valgaudemar

Government
  - Mayor (2026–32): Sébastien Rouit
- Area^{1}: 98.27 km^{2} (37.94 sq mi)
- Elevation: 1,439 m (4,721 ft)
- Highest elevation: 3,117 m (10,226 ft)
- Lowest elevation: 1,174 m (3,852 ft)
- Population (2023): 651
  - Density: 6.62/km^{2} (17.2/sq mi)
- Time zone: UTC+01:00 (CET)
  - Summer (DST): UTC+02:00 (CEST)
- INSEE/Postal code: 05096 /05170
- ^{1} French Land Register data, which excludes lakes, ponds, glaciers > 1 km^{2} (0.386 sq mi or 247 acres) and river estuaries.

Orcières (French pronunciation: [ɔʁsjɛʁ]; Occitan: Orsiera) is a commune in the Hautes-Alpes department, Provence-Alpes-Côte d'Azur, southeastern France.

== Population ==
Historical population
Year	Pop.	±% p.a.
1968	734	—
1975	855	+2.20%
1982	890	+0.57%
1990	841	−0.71%
1999	810	−0.42%
2007	712	−1.60%
2012	725	+0.36%
2017	690	−0.98%
2023	651	−0.97%
Source: INSEE

== See also ==
- Communes of the Hautes-Alpes department
