= Daniel Gisiger =

Swiss cyclist

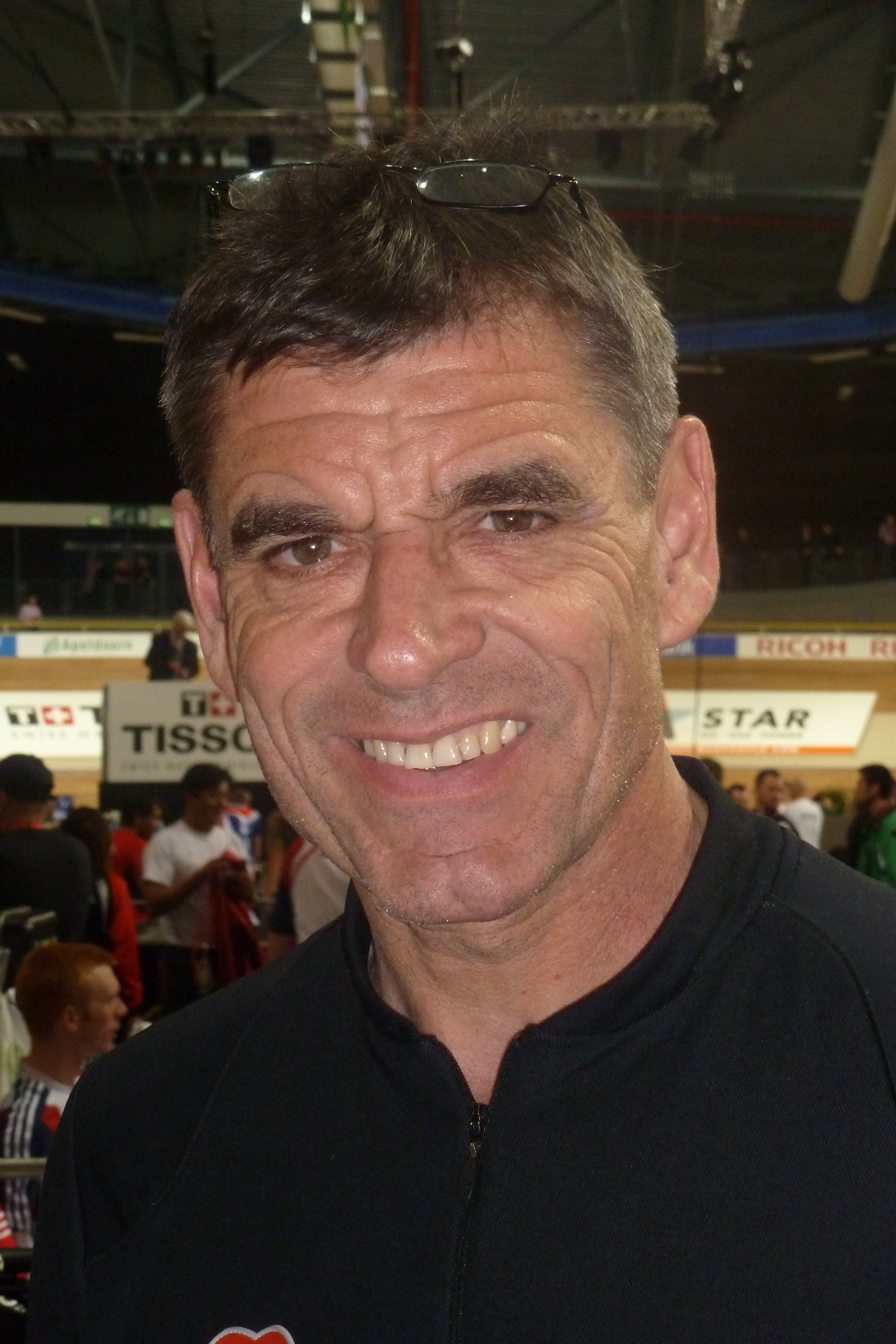

Personal information
- Full name: Daniel Gisiger
- Born: 9 October 1954 (age 72) Baccarat, France

Cycling career
- Sport: Cycling
- Current team: Retired
- Disciplines: Road; Track Individual and Team Time Trial
- Role: Rider

Major wins
- Giro d'Italia, 2 stages

Daniel Gisiger (born 9 October 1954, in Baccarat) is a retired Swiss road and track cyclist. He grew up in Bienne, in RC Olympia Biel-Bienne.

One of his strongest disciplines was the road time trial where he twice won the prestigious Grand Prix des Nations time trial in 1981 and 1983, generally regarded at the time as the unofficial world time trial championship as well as the Trofeo Baracchi a two-man team time trial on three occasions, once each with Serge Demierre, Roberto Visentini and Silvano Contini. He was one of the first world-class riders to use a special aerodynamic bike with concealed cables and aerodynamic components and also placed emphasis on aerodynamic clothing by wearing a one-piece Lycra skinsuit.

In his earlier pre-professional years he broke the World Hour Record for amateur riders with 46.745 km, just 1,686 metres short of Eddy Merckx's professional record set at a higher altitude in 1972 in Mexico City.

== Major results ==
- 2 stages of the Giro d'Italia
- 1 stage of the Tour de Suisse
- 1 stages of the Tour de Romandie
- Swiss points champion 1987
- Grand Prix des Nations 1981, 1983
- Trofeo Baracchi 1981, 1982, 1983
- Grand Prix de Gippingen 1980, 1981
- Six Days de Zurich 1983, 1984, 1986, 1989
