= Vermeer Thijs =

Team information
- Registered: Belgium
- Founded: 1978
- Disbanded: 1982
- Discipline: Road

Key personnel
- General manager: Roger Swerts (1980–1982)

Team name history
- 1978 1979 1980 1981–1982: Mini-Flat–Boule d'Or–Colnago; Mini-Flat–V.D.B.–Pirelli; Vermeer Thijs–Mini-Flat; Vermeer Thijs
Vermeer Thijs jersey
Jersey

Vermeer Thijs was a Belgian professional cycling team that existed from 1978 to 1982. It was the successor to the Maes Pils–Mini-Flat team.

== See also ==
- Boule d'Or (cycling team)
