= List of teams and cyclists in the 1984 Giro d'Italia =

The 1984 Giro d'Italia was the 67th edition of the Giro d'Italia, one of cycling's Grand Tours. The field consisted of 170 riders, and 143 riders finished the race.

== By rider ==
Legend
No.	Starting number worn by the rider during the Giro
Pos.	Position in the general classification
DNF	Denotes a rider who did not finish

No.	Name	Nationality	Team	Ref
1	Giuseppe Saronni	Italy	Del Tongo–Colnago	
2	Emanuele Bombini	Italy	Del Tongo–Colnago	
3	Claudio Bortolotto	Italy	Del Tongo–Colnago	
4	Roberto Ceruti	Italy	Del Tongo–Colnago	
5	Rudy Pevenage	Belgium	Del Tongo–Colnago	
6	Maurizio Piovani	Italy	Del Tongo–Colnago	
7	Sergio Santimaria	Italy	Del Tongo–Colnago	
8	Guido Van Calster	Belgium	Del Tongo–Colnago	
9	Leonardo Natale	Italy	Del Tongo–Colnago	
11	Juan Carlos Alonso	Spain	Alfa Lum–Olmo	
12	Mauro Angelucci	Italy	Alfa Lum–Olmo	
13	Marino Amadori	Italy	Alfa Lum–Olmo	
14	Salvatore Maccali	Italy	Alfa Lum–Olmo	
15	Orlando Maini	Italy	Alfa Lum–Olmo	
16	Giuseppe Martinelli	Italy	Alfa Lum–Olmo	
17	Giuseppe Petito	Italy	Alfa Lum–Olmo	
18	Marino Lejarreta	Spain	Alfa Lum–Olmo	
19	Michael Wilson	Australia	Alfa Lum–Olmo	
21	Carmelo Barone	Italy	Ariostea	
22	Giuseppe Faraca	Italy	Ariostea	
23	Luigi Ferreri	Italy	Ariostea	
24	Giovanni Moro	Italy	Ariostea	
25	Graziano Salvietti	Italy	Ariostea	
26	Amilcare Sgalbazzi	Italy	Ariostea	
27	Giovanni Viero	Italy	Ariostea	
28	Marco Antonio López Durán	Mexico	Ariostea	
29	Paul Wellens	Belgium	Ariostea	
31	Fiorenzo Aliverti	Italy	Atala	
32	Giancarlo Casiraghi	Italy	Atala	
33	Urs Freuler	Switzerland	Atala	
34	Pierino Gavazzi	Italy	Atala	
35	Daniel Gisiger	Switzerland	Atala	
36	Dante Morandi	Italy	Atala	
37	Mario Noris	Italy	Atala	
38	Wladimiro Panizza	Italy	Atala	
39	Gerhard Zadrobilek	Austria	Atala	
41	Tullio Bertacco	Italy	Bianchi–Piaggio	
42	Silvano Contini	Italy	Bianchi–Piaggio	
43	Valeriano Piva	Italy	Bianchi–Piaggio	
44	Alessandro Pozzi	Italy	Bianchi–Piaggio	
45	Maurizio Viotto	Italy	Bianchi–Piaggio	
46	Paolo Rosola	Italy	Bianchi–Piaggio	
47	Alf Segersäll	Sweden	Bianchi–Piaggio	
48	Ennio Vanotti	Italy	Bianchi–Piaggio	
49	Fabrizio Verza	Italy	Bianchi–Piaggio	
51	Giovanni Battaglin	Italy	Carrera–Inoxpran	
52	Guido Bontempi	Italy	Carrera–Inoxpran	
53	Giancarlo Perini	Italy	Carrera–Inoxpran	
54	Czesław Lang	Poland	Carrera–Inoxpran	
55	Bruno Leali	Italy	Carrera–Inoxpran	
56	Luciano Loro	Italy	Carrera–Inoxpran	
57	Valerio Lualdi	Italy	Carrera–Inoxpran	
58	Glauco Santoni	Italy	Carrera–Inoxpran	
59	Roberto Visentini	Italy	Carrera–Inoxpran	
61	Alfio Vandi	Italy	Dromedario	
62	Franco Conti	Italy	Dromedario	
63	Cesare Cipollini	Italy	Dromedario	
64	Erminio Olmatti	Italy	Dromedario	
65	Claudio Savini	Italy	Dromedario	
66	Marco Groppo	Italy	Dromedario	
67	Eddy Schepers	Belgium	Dromedario	
68	Gottfried Schmutz	Switzerland	Dromedario	
69	Siegfried Hekimi	Switzerland	Dromedario	
71	Jens Veggerby	Denmark	Fanini–Wührer	
72	Steen Michael Petersen	Denmark	Fanini–Wührer	
73	Giuliano Biatta	Italy	Fanini–Wührer	
74	Ettore Bazzichi	Italy	Fanini–Wührer	
75	Nazzareno Berto	Italy	Fanini–Wührer	
76	Francesco Bianchi	Italy	Fanini–Wührer	
77	Erwin Lienhard	Switzerland	Fanini–Wührer	
78	Luciano Lorenzi	Italy	Fanini–Wührer	
79	Enrico Maestrelli	Italy	Fanini–Wührer	
81	Eduardo Chozas	Spain	Zor–Gemeaz Cusin	
82	Faustino Rupérez	Spain	Zor–Gemeaz Cusin	
83	Alberto Fernández	Spain	Zor–Gemeaz Cusin	
84	Juan Fernández	Spain	Zor–Gemeaz Cusin	
85	Álvaro Pino	Spain	Zor–Gemeaz Cusin	
86	José Luis López Cerrón	Spain	Zor–Gemeaz Cusin	
87	Jesús Ignacio Ibánez Loyo	Spain	Zor–Gemeaz Cusin	
88	Jesús Rodríguez	Spain	Zor–Gemeaz Cusin	
89	Ángel Camarillo	Spain	Zor–Gemeaz Cusin	
91	Francesco Moser	Italy	Gis Gelati–Tuc Lu	
92	David Akam	Great Britain	Gis Gelati–Tuc Lu	
93	Roger De Vlaeminck	Belgium	Gis Gelati–Tuc Lu	
94	Stefano Giuliani	Italy	Gis Gelati–Tuc Lu	
95	Martin Havik	Netherlands	Gis Gelati–Tuc Lu	
96	Palmiro Masciarelli	Italy	Gis Gelati–Tuc Lu	
97	Piero Onesti	Italy	Gis Gelati–Tuc Lu	
98	Giuseppe Passuello	Italy	Gis Gelati–Tuc Lu	
99	Ennio Salvador	Italy	Gis Gelati–Tuc Lu	
101	John Eustice	United States	Gianni Motta - Linea M.D. Italia	
102	Claude Michely	Luxembourg	Gianni Motta - Linea M.D. Italia	
103	Karl Maxon	United States	Gianni Motta - Linea M.D. Italia	
104	Daniel Franger	United States	Gianni Motta - Linea M.D. Italia	
105	Rudy Weber	West Germany	Gianni Motta - Linea M.D. Italia	
106	Michael Carter	United States	Gianni Motta - Linea M.D. Italia	
107	Tim Rutledge	United States	Gianni Motta - Linea M.D. Italia	
108	Greg Saunders	United States	Gianni Motta - Linea M.D. Italia	
109	Guy Janiszewski	Belgium	Gianni Motta - Linea M.D. Italia	
111	Thierry Bolle	Switzerland	Cilo–Aufina–Magniflex	
112	Beat Breu	Switzerland	Cilo–Aufina–Magniflex	
113	Antonio Ferretti	Switzerland	Cilo–Aufina–Magniflex	
114	Bernard Gavillet	Switzerland	Cilo–Aufina–Magniflex	
115	Gilbert Glaus	Switzerland	Cilo–Aufina–Magniflex	
116	Marcel Russenberger	Switzerland	Cilo–Aufina–Magniflex	
117	Stefan Mutter	Switzerland	Cilo–Aufina–Magniflex	
118	Hubert Seiz	Switzerland	Cilo–Aufina–Magniflex	
119	Daniel Wyder	Switzerland	Cilo–Aufina–Magniflex	
121	Mario Beccia	Italy	Malvor–Bottecchia	
122	Antonio Bevilacqua	Italy	Malvor–Bottecchia	
123	Leonardo Bevilacqua	Italy	Malvor–Bottecchia	
124	Giovanni Mantovani	Italy	Malvor–Bottecchia	
125	Silvestro Milani	Italy	Malvor–Bottecchia	
126	Bruno Vicino	Italy	Malvor–Bottecchia	
127	Jürg Bruggmann	Switzerland	Malvor–Bottecchia	
128	Acácio da Silva	Portugal	Malvor–Bottecchia	
129	Vinko Polončič	Yugoslavia	Malvor–Bottecchia	
131	Lucien Van Impe	Belgium	Metauro Mobili–Pinarello	
132	Vittorio Algeri	Italy	Metauro Mobili–Pinarello	
133	Pierangelo Bincoletto	Italy	Metauro Mobili–Pinarello	
134	Riccardo Magrini	Italy	Metauro Mobili–Pinarello	
135	Luciano Rabottini	Italy	Metauro Mobili–Pinarello	
136	Frits Pirard	Netherlands	Metauro Mobili–Pinarello	
137	Johan van der Velde	Netherlands	Metauro Mobili–Pinarello	
138	Flavio Zappi	Italy	Metauro Mobili–Pinarello	
139	Marco Franceschini	Italy	Metauro Mobili–Pinarello	
141	Gianbattista Baronchelli	Italy	Murella	
142	Roberto Bressan	Italy	Murella	
143	Franco Chioccioli	Italy	Murella	
144	Benedetto Patellaro	Italy	Murella	
145	Dag Erik Pedersen	Norway	Murella	
146	Filippo Piersanti	Italy	Murella	
147	Marino Polini	Italy	Murella	
148	Giovanni Renosto	Italy	Murella	
149	Daniel Willems	Belgium	Murella	
151	Laurent Fignon	France	Renault–Elf	
152	Philippe Chevallier	France	Renault–Elf	
153	Bruno Wojtinek	France	Renault–Elf	
154	Martial Gayant	France	Renault–Elf	
155	Dominique Gaigne	France	Renault–Elf	
156	Pierre-Henri Menthéour	France	Renault–Elf	
157	Charly Mottet	France	Renault–Elf	
158	Éric Salomon	France	Renault–Elf	
159	Philippe Saudé	France	Renault–Elf	
161	Moreno Argentin	Italy	Sammontana	
162	Claudio Corti	Italy	Sammontana	
163	Fiorenzo Favero	Italy	Sammontana	
164	Piero Ghibaudo	Italy	Sammontana	
165	Dario Mariuzzi	Italy	Sammontana	
166	Alessandro Paganessi	Italy	Sammontana	
167	Claudio Torelli	Italy	Sammontana	
168	Jesper Worre	Denmark	Sammontana	
169	Raniero Gradi	Italy	Sammontana	
171	Davide Cassani	Italy	Santini	
172	Daniele Caroli	Italy	Santini	
173	Mario Mariotti	Italy	Santini	
174	Elio Festa	Italy	Santini	
175	Gino Stefani	Italy	Santini	
176	Silvano Riccò	Italy	Santini	
177	René Koppert	Netherlands	Santini	
178	Sven-Åke Nilsson	Sweden	Santini	
179	David McFarlane	Australia	Santini	
181	Jonathan Boyer	United States	Supermercati Brianzoli	
182	Alfredo Chinetti	Italy	Supermercati Brianzoli	
183	Giocondo Dalla Rizza	Italy	Supermercati Brianzoli	
184	Mauro Longo	Italy	Supermercati Brianzoli	
185	Giuliano Pavanello	Italy	Supermercati Brianzoli	
186	John Patterson	United States	Supermercati Brianzoli	
187	Gianmarco Saccani	Italy	Supermercati Brianzoli	
188	Massimo Santambrogio	Italy	Supermercati Brianzoli	
189	Ole Kristian Silseth	Norway	Supermercati Brianzoli	
