= Robin Morton (cycling) =

American cycling team manager

Cycling career
- Sport: Cycling
- Current team: Retired
- Discipline: Road
- Role: Team Manager

Managerial teams
- 1984: Gianni Motta–Linea M.D. Italia
- 1985: Xerox-Philadelphia Lasers
- 1986: Murella - Fanini
- 1987–1988: Pepsi Cola - Alba Cucina
- 1989: Eurocar - Vetta - Galli
- 1990: Amore & Vita - Tommasini
- 1991: Poland Spring - Global Travel

Robin Morton is an American former cycling team manager and was the first and only female manager in men's professional cycling. She also created the first Union Cycliste Internationale (UCI) registered American professional road racing team in 1984. Cycling in Europe is a traditionally male sport and includes rules prohibiting women from the race caravans. At managers' meetings prior to races in Europe, the race organization would vote on whether Morton would be allowed to ride in the team car. Morton was elected to the United States Bicycling Hall of Fame in 2016.

In 2011 CyclingNews acknowledged Robin as one of the five most influential women in the sport of cycling.

== Career ==
=== 1980–82 ===
Morton's first involvement with cycling was with the amateur racing team of the Pennsylvania Bicycle Club (PBC) of Germantown, Pennsylvania assisting with team management and race organization.

=== 1983 ===
Morton managed a US pro cycling team sponsored by GIOS bicycles for the Tour of America with Roger De Vlaeminck and John Eustice, two time USPRO National Criterium Champion at the USA Cycling Championships in 1982 and 1983 and Jeff Rutter.

Later that year she managed the 7-UP team with John, Jeff Rutter, Dag Selander and Ian Jackson that participated at Superweek and other races on the domestic calendar.

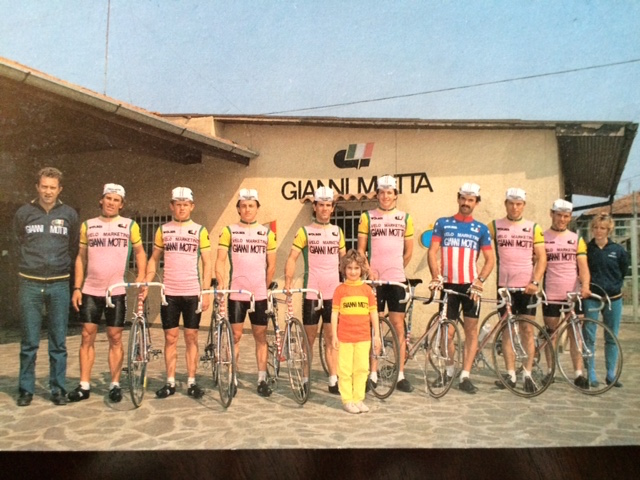
Team Photo at the Gianni Motta Factory in Italy - 1984

=== 1984 ===
Morton registered the first American professional road race team thus becoming the first woman in the history of cycling to own and manage and direct a men’s professional team.

That year the team, sponsored by Gianni Motta, became the first U.S. team to enter the 1984 Giro d'Italia,Giro di Puglia, Giro di Toscana, Giro del Trentino and Tour de Suisse and other European races.

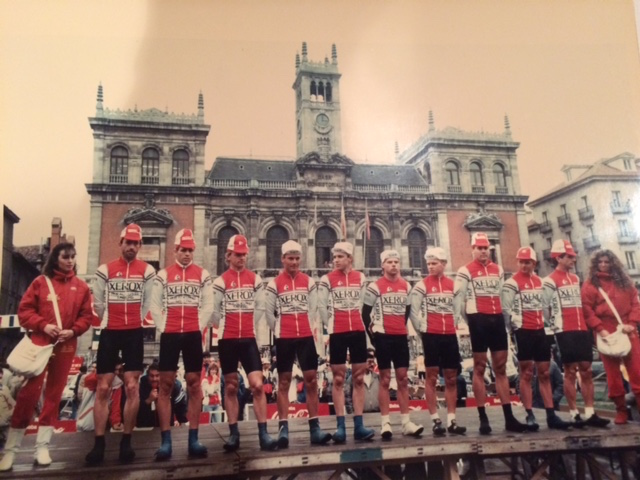
Xerox Team Presentation - 1985 Vuelta e España

Robin was the first woman in the world to manage a men's professional cycling team as reported in TuttoBiciWeb .

=== 1985 ===
Morton put together another U.S. based team, the Philadelphia Lasers, sponsored by Rank Xerox and Benotto. This was the first U.S. professional team to compete in the 1985 Vuelta a España and other races on the European calendar including Critérium du Dauphiné Libéré, Midi Libre, Tour de Luxembourg and the Vuelta a Colombia.

In 1985-86 Morton had a very successful Junior Team winning many races, numerous state championships and several national championships. The team included Steve Scuron from Philadelphia, the first Junior ever to win the amateur men's elite national championship(80K) in 1985. The team also included Jonas Carney, winner of many amateur and professional national championships.

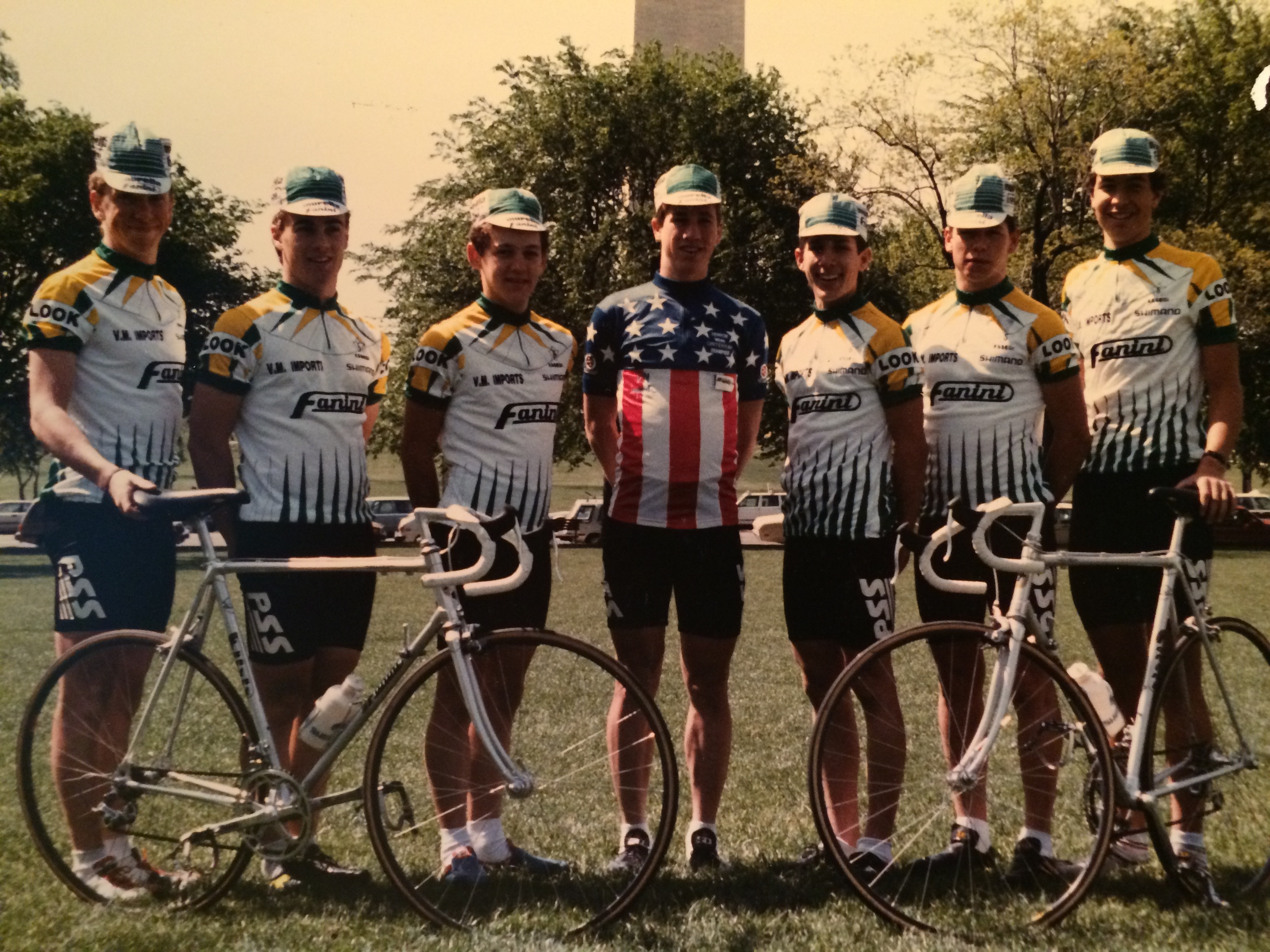
Junior Team National Capitol Open, Washington D.C. - 1986

=== 1986 ===
This year Robin managed the domestic U.S. program for the Murella-Fanini team that included Gregor Braun

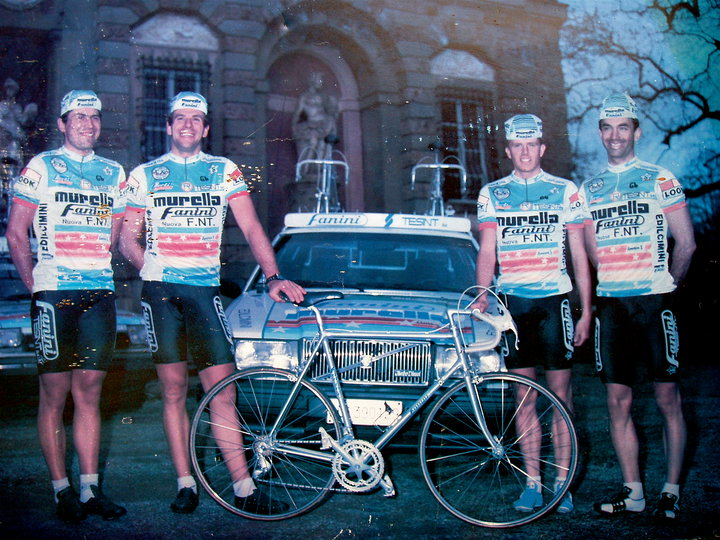
Murella-Fanini 1986

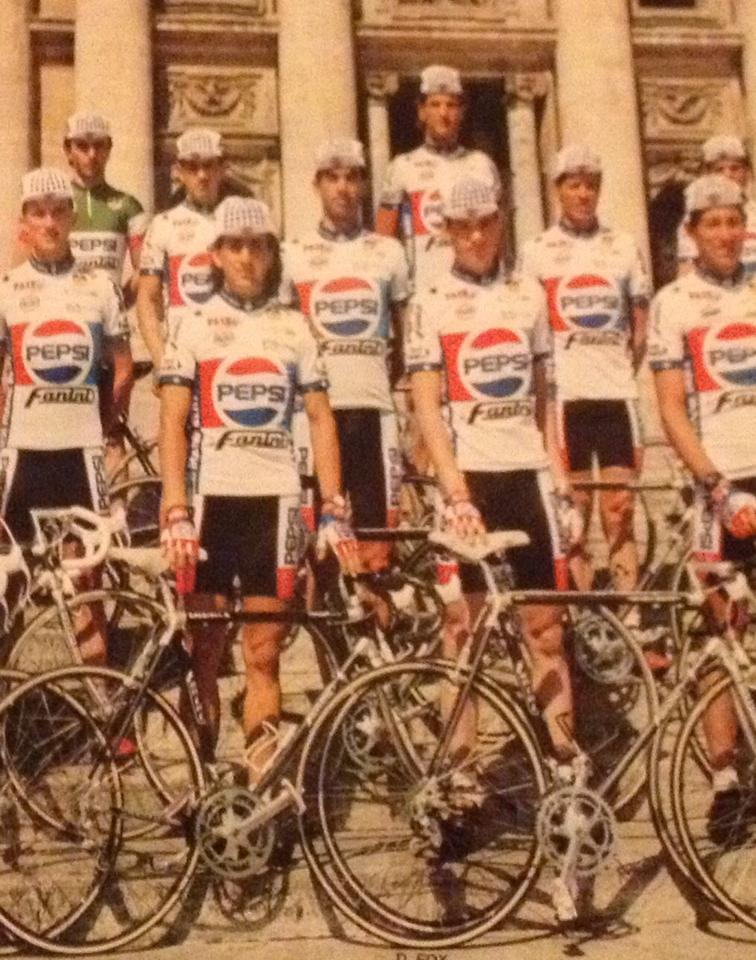
Pepsi-Fanini Team Presentation in Italy - 1987

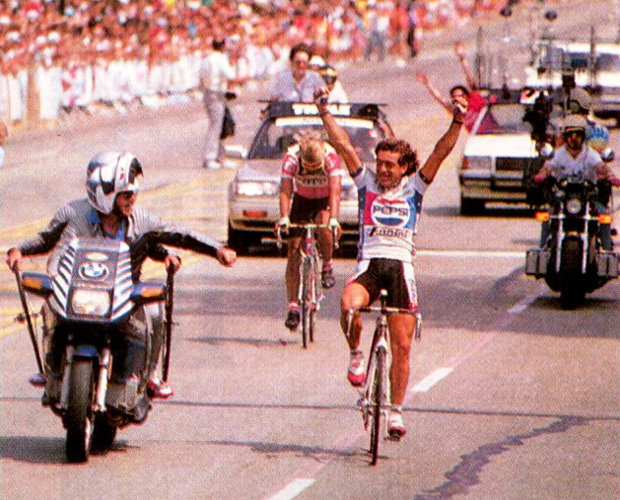
Roberto winning the 1988 CoreStates Championship in Philadelphia

https://commons.wikimedia.org/wiki/File:Murello_fanini.jpg

=== 1987–89 ===
In 1987 through 1988 the Pepsi-Fanini team was sponsored by Pepsi-Cola and in 1989 by EuroCar. The team with Roberto Gaggioli won 80 races in the U.S. during these three years. The team raced in the 1987 edition of the Coors Classic from Hawaii to Colorado winning the Reno criterium stage.

In 1988 Roberto won the CoreStates Pro Cycling Championships Philadelphia International Cycling Classic in Philadelphia and the team won the team prize.

The EuroCar team participated in the inaugural Tour de Trump in 1989.

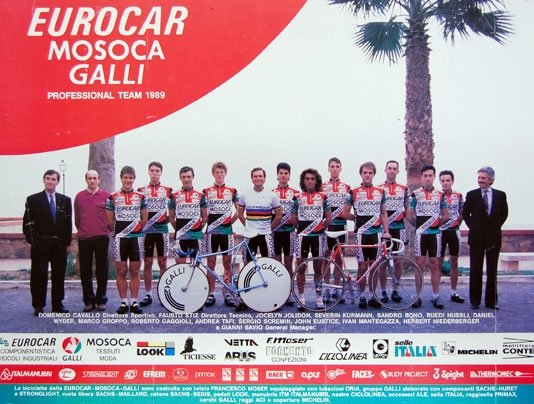
Eurocar Team Photo 1989

=== 1990-91 ===
The Amore and Vita team was sponsored by Poland Spring, Subaru and Tommasini.

=== Event promotion (1989 to present) ===
In 1989 Morton started working for a company promoting the professional races in the U.S. as well as planning and execution for charitable events.

Robin eventually became the Technical Director for the Men's National Professional Cycling Championship, as well as other events through 2005 that included the West Virginia K-Mart Classic stage race, Tour de Georgia, the San Francisco Grand Prix, the Thrift Drug Classic in Pittsburgh, and numerous other major events in the U.S. that include:

- Philadelphia Cycling Classic presented by AmeriGas 2026
- The Rock N Road Gravel Series Ride at the Valley Preferred Cycling Center 2019
- Volkswagen USA Cycling Professional Road Race and Time Trial Championships
- Volkswagen USA Cycling Masters and Para Cycling Road National Championships - 2016
- National Senior Games - 2013 and 2015
- Danbury Race4Scholars Criterium 2014
- PARX Casino Philly Cycling Classic 2013-2014
- Winston-Salem Cycling Classic 2015-2017
- Philadelphia International Cycling Classic 2015-2016
- Philadelphia Marathon 2010-2015
- Mercer Mountain Bike Festival, Belle Mountain, Mercer County, New Jersey, 2009
- The CSC Invitational Criterium in Arlington, VA - 2008-2009
- The US Air Force Cycling Classic Road Race and Citizens Ride in Arlington, VA - 2008-2009
- The Capital Criterium in Washington, DC - 2008, 2010
- U.S. Gran Prix of Cyclocross Series – 2006
- The Wachovia USPRO Championship/Liberty Classic in Philadelphia, PA 1985-2005
- The Wachovia Lancaster Invitational in Lancaster, PA 1991-2005
- The Wachovia Classic in Trenton, NJ 1992-2005
- The Christiana Care Cup in Wilmington, DE 1997-1998
- The New Jersey National Bank Classic in Freehold, NJ 1990-1991
- The T-Mobile International in San Francisco, CA 2002-2004
- The Barclays Global Investors Grand Prix in San Francisco, CA 2005
- The BMC Software GRAND PRIX SERIES in New York City, Houston, San Jose, Austin and Arlington 1999-2004
- Dodge Tour de Georgia (technical services and operations) 2003
- The Thrift Drug Classic in Pittsburgh, PA 1990 to 1997
- The Kmart Classic of West Virginia 1992 to 1996
- The Norwest Cup in Minneapolis, MN 1992 to 1996
- The First Union Grand Prix in Atlanta, GA 1992 to 1998
- USA Cycling Olympic Selection events in Pittsburgh, PA 1996
- USA Cycling Olympic Selection events in Martinsburg, WVA 1996
- Sea Otter Classic (technical services) in Monterey, CA 2000
- Saturn Pro Cycling Tour 1999-2001 (14 events)
- Olympic Games- Track and Road cycling events in Atlanta, GA 1996
- Paralympic Games- Road Cycling events in Atlanta, GA 1996

In 2009 Morton was part of a group involved in bringing the Giro d'Italia to Washington D.C. in 2012.

Morton is now a partner in g4 Productions, a company that promotes fundraising, cycling, and running events. Fundraising events include the Tour De Pink a 4 Day Breast Cancer Ride benefiting the Young Survival Coalition 2006-2019 and 2021–23, The New Jersey Ride for Autism 2008-2019, Tour de Summer Camps 2019-22, Philadelphia Flyers Charity Classic 2017-18 and 2022, 2025, Philadelphia Eagles Autism Challenge 2018-19, and 2021–25, Ride to Defeat ALS 2018-19 and 2022–25, Go the Distance 2020, 2022–25, Cycle of Support 2022-25, World Bicycle Relief - Pedal to Empower 2021, GrinDuro (Shimano), Pa 2023-24, RAGBRAI - Iowa 2024, Unbound Gravel (Shimano) 2025, Hershey's Pedal For Goodness 2017, Bike for the Heart benefiting the Sister to Sister Foundation 2009, Walk/Ride to Benefit the Brain Injury Association of NJ - 2010, Alex's Lemonade Stand to benefit Childhood Cancer - 2012.

=== Notable riders ===
Riders that have been on teams managed by Morton include two-time Olympic gold medalist Gregor Braun, Six Day winner and wearer of the Tour de France Yellow Jersey - Dietrich Thurau, Roger De Vlaeminck - multi-time winner of Paris–Roubaix, Olympic gold medalist in the team time trial at the 1984 Olympics - Marcello Bartolini and Matt Eaton, winner of the 1983 Tour of Britain known as the Milk Race.

=== Other experience ===
Morton also served as the cycling assistant competition manager for 1996 Summer Olympics and 1996 Summer Paralympics in Atlanta, Georgia.

In 2006 Morton started her own event promotion company to focus on road racing, cyclo-cross and fund-raising events.

== U.S. Bicycling Hall of Fame ==
In November 2016 Robin was inducted into the U.S. Bicycling Hall of Fame in acknowledgement of accomplishments during her 35 years in the sport.

== Media appearances ==
=== News Papers ===
- The Philadelphia Inquirer 1986 Dave Caldwell
- The Philadelphia Inquirer June 20, 1988 front page and section C
- Philadelphia Daily News June 20, 1988 Bill Fleischman
- The New York Times June 19, 1988 Wendy Solomon
- International Herald Tribune June 6, 1989 Sam Abt
- International Herald Tribune June 12, 1997 Sam Abt
- The New York Times October 17, 1999 Sam Abt
- The New York Times December 14, 2009 Juliet Macur
- The Philadelphia Inquirer March 8, 2010 Christopher Hepp

=== Books ===
- Up The Road by Sam Abt, published 2005, pages 52–55
- The Fabulous World of Cycling Season 1984, page 98
- Come and Gone by Joe Parkin, published 2010 - acknowledgements
- The Story of the Giro d'Italia - A Year by Year History of the Tour of Italy - Volume Two by Bill and Carol McGann, published 2011, page 94

=== Magazines ===
- Winning Bicycle Racing Illustrated July 1984 page 10
- Winning Bicycle Racing Illustrated August 1988 pages 52–54
- Winning Bicycle Racing Illustrated September 1990 pages 21–22
- PhillySports Magazine 1986 July issue
- Peloton Magazine 2011 June/July issue page 38
