= Michael Carter (cyclist) =

American cyclist

Personal information
- Born: March 3, 1963 (age 63) Denver, Colorado, U.S.

Cycling career
- Sport: Cycling
- Current team: Retired
- Discipline: Road
- Role: Rider

Professional teams
- 1984: Gianni Motta - Linea M.D. Italia
- 1985: Xerox–Philadelphia Lasers
- 1986–1987: Löwenbrau–Dia Compe
- 1988: Zero Boys
- 1989: Coors Light
- 1990: Alpine Colorado
- 1991: Motorola
- 1992–1993: Subaru–Montgomery
- 1994: Guiltless Gourmet
- 1995: Navigators
- 2003–2006: Marco Polo

Managerial teams
- 2007–2009: Discovery Channel–Marco Polo
- 2010–2011: Team Type 1

Michael Carter (born March 3, 1963) is an American racing cyclist. He still races as an amateur. He competed in the 1984 Giro d'Italia with the Gianni Motta–Linea M.D. Italia team, the first American team to compete in any of cycling's grand tours, he also rode for Xerox–Philadelphia Lasers in the 1985 Vuelta a España and Team Motorola in the 1991 Tour de France.

In 2008, he finished third in the world masters road championship, in the 45-49 age category, won by Belgian Kenny De Maerteleire.

== Major results ==
1989
1st Overall Cascade Cycling Classic
1991
3rd Overall Tour de Romandie
3rd Overall Ruta Mexico
1992
1st Stage 4 Tour de la Willamette
1993
3rd Overall Ruta Mexico
2001
1st Martigny-Mauvoisin
2002
5th Overall Tour of Qinghai Lake
2003
2nd Overall Tour de Korea
2006
3rd Mount Evans Hill Climb
8th Overall Tour of Siam
2007
3rd Mount Evans Hill Climb
