= 1991 Tour de Romandie =

Race details
- Dates: 7–12 May 1991
- Stages: 5 + Prologue
- Distance: 786.9 km (489.0 mi)
- Winning time: 21h 00' 19"

Results
| | Winner | Tony Rominger (SUI) | (Toshiba) |
| | Second | Robert Millar (GBR) | (Z) |
| | Third | Michael Carter (USA) | (Motorola) |

The 1991 Tour de Romandie was the 45th edition of the Tour de Romandie cycle race and was held from 7 May to 12 May 1991. The race started in Chiasso and finished in Geneva. The race was won by Tony Rominger of the Toshiba team.

== General classification ==
Final general classification
| Rank | Rider | Team | Time |
|---|---|---|---|
| 1 | Tony Rominger (SUI) | Toshiba | 21h 00' 19" |
| 2 | Robert Millar (GBR) | Z | + 1' 31" |
| 3 | Michael Carter (USA) | Motorola | + 2' 52" |
| 4 | Stephen Hodge (AUS) | ONCE | + 3' 00" |
| 5 | Laurent Dufaux (SUI) | Helvetia–La Suisse | + 3' 27" |
| 6 | Uwe Ampler (GER) | Histor–Sigma | + 3' 52" |
| 7 | Zenon Jaskuła (POL) | Del Tongo–MG Boys | + 4' 06" |
| 8 | Denis Roux (FRA) | Toshiba | + 4' 50" |
| 9 | Gianni Bugno (ITA) | Chateau d'Ax–Gatorade | + 5' 12" |
| 10 | Pedro Delgado (ESP) | Banesto | + 5' 38" |
