= Santa Maria dei Domenicani, Soave =

Church building in Soave, Italy

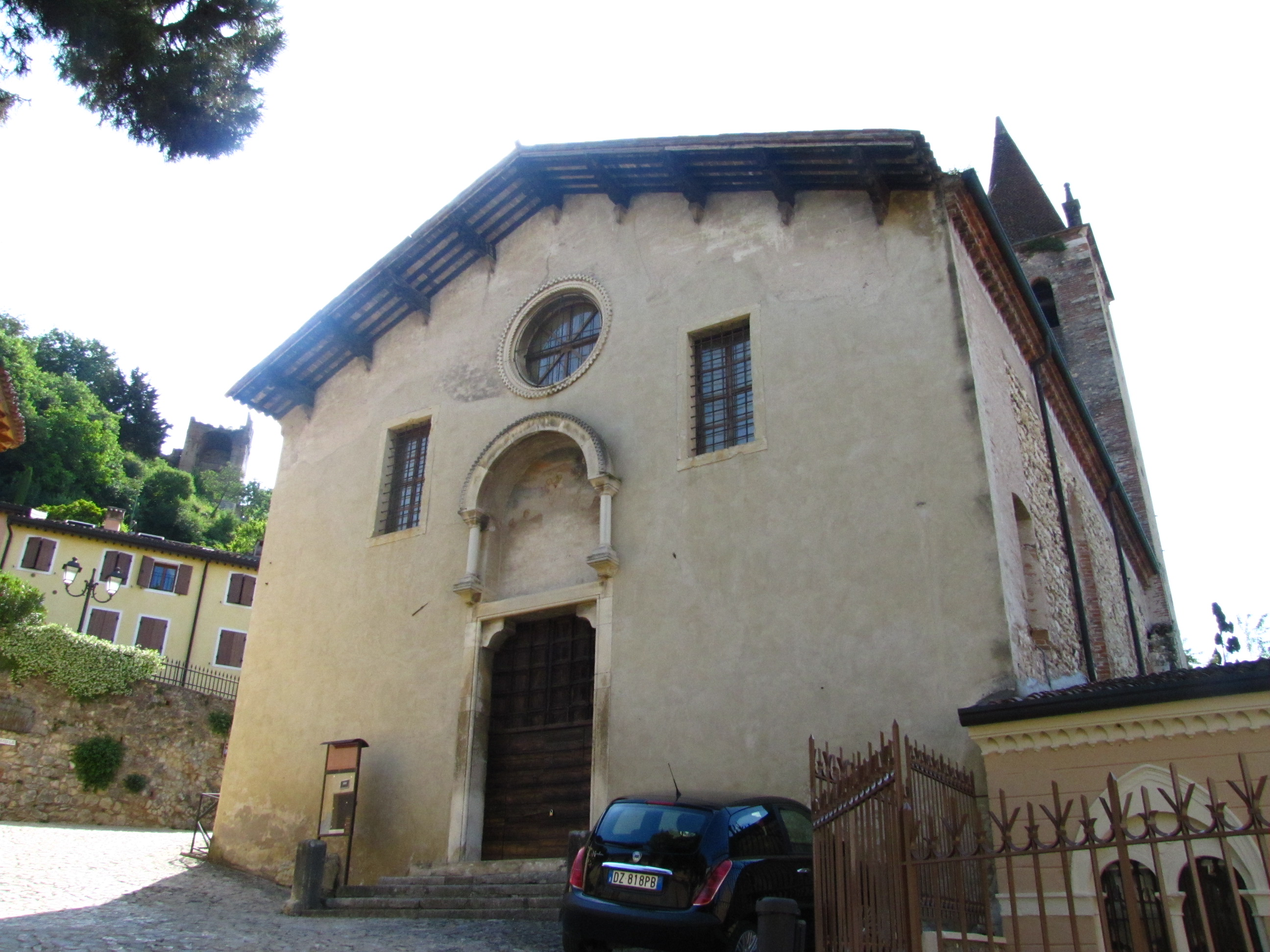
The facade of Santa Maria dei Domenicani

Santa Maria dei Domenicani is a small, 15th-century, Roman Catholic church, located inside the Scaliger walls near Piazza dell’Antenna in Soave, province of Verona, region of Veneto, Italy.

== History ==
By 1443, the church and the nearby convent were commissioned and built by the Dominican friars. During the 17th century, a suppression of mendicant orders closed this convent. In 1659 the inhabitants of Soave requested permission from Venetian authorities to take possession of the site, pledging also to celebrate every year one hundred and two masses. In 1871 the convent was sold by the City and later destroyed. The church became a public oratory, which had been maintained by the local parish, who held the catechism and masses for young people. The structure fell into disrepair. In 1985, the Banca Popolare of Verona financed and the comune approved a restoration.

== Architectural profile ==
The 15th-century building has a simple and sober layout. It was built during an era of transition between Gothic and the Renaissance styles. The shades of different colors, green, ocher and white, alternate and create a particular architectural harmony. The single nave, is illuminated with tall gothic windows. The altar, made in marble, flanked by two little baroque doors. Three other altars are placed in the chapels located on the left wall of the church.

The 15th-century chapels have arches in tufa, finely sculptured pilasters, frescoes and colored marbles. The first chapel is dedicated to St Lucy and Apollonia, as evidence of a widespread local devotion. The second chapel is dedicated to the Blessed Virgin of the Rosary. The last was devoted to the crucified Christ. The third chapel must have been owned by two illustrious families, probably from Illasi.
