= 1984 Giro d'Italia =

Race details
- Dates: 17 May – 10 June 1984
- Stages: 22 + Prologue
- Distance: 3,808 km (2,366 mi)
- Winning time: 98h 32' 20"

Results
Jersey awarded to the overall winner	Winner	Francesco Moser (ITA)	(Gis Gelati–Tuc Lu)
	Second	Laurent Fignon (FRA)	(Renault–Elf)
	Third	Moreno Argentin (ITA)	(Sammontana–Campagnolo)
Jersey awarded to the points classification winner	Points	Urs Freuler (SUI)	(Atala–Campagnolo)
Jersey awarded to the mountains classification winner	Mountains	Laurent Fignon (FRA)	(Renault–Elf)
Jersey awarded to the youth classification winner	Youth	Charly Mottet (FRA)	(Renault–Elf)
	Team	Renault–Elf	
	Team points	Metauro Mobili–Pinarello	

The 1984 Giro d'Italia was the 67th running of the Giro. It started in Lucca, on 17 May, with a 5 km (3.1 mi) prologue and concluded in Verona, on 10 June, with a 42 km (26.1 mi) individual time trial. A total of 171 riders from nineteen teams entered the 22-stage race, that was won by Italian Francesco Moser of the Gis Gelati–Tuc Lu team. The second and third places were taken by Frenchman Laurent Fignon and Italian Moreno Argentin, respectively.

Amongst the other classifications that the race awarded, Urs Freuler of Atala–Campagnolo won the points classification, Fignon of Renault–Elf won the mountains classification, and Renault–Elf's Charly Mottet completed the Giro as the best neo-professional in the general classification, finishing twenty-first overall. Renault–Elf finishing as the winners of the team classification, ranking each of the twenty teams contesting the race by lowest cumulative time. The team points classification was won by Metauro Mobili–Pinarello.

== Teams ==
A total of nineteen teams were invited to participate in the 1984 Giro d'Italia. The presentation of the teams – where each team's roster and manager are introduced in front the media and local dignitaries – took place at the Piazza San Marco in Lucca on 16 May. The starting riders came from a total of 18 different countries; Italy (100), Switzerland (15), and Spain (11) all had more than 10 riders. Each team sent a squad of nine riders, which meant that the race started with a peloton of 171 cyclists. Gianni Motta–Linea M.D. Italia' team manager Robin Morton was the first female to manage a team in the history of the Giro.

Of those starting, 45 were riding the Giro d'Italia for the first time. The average age of riders was 26.68 years, ranging from 21–year–old Bruno Wojtinek (Renault–Elf) to 38–year–old Wladimiro Panizza (Atala–Campagnolo). The team with the youngest average rider age was Renault–Elf (22), while the oldest was Carrera–Inoxpran (29). From the riders that began this edition, 143 made it to the finish in Merano.

The teams entering the race were:

- Del Tongo–Colnago
- Alfa Lum–Olmo
- Ariostea
- Atala–Campagnolo
- Bianchi–Piaggio
- Carrera–Inoxpran
- Dromedario-Alan
- Fanini–Wührer
- Zor–Gemeaz Cusin
- Gis Gelati–Tuc Lu
- Gianni Motta–Linea M.D. Italia
- Cilo–Aufina
- Malvor–Bottecchia
- Metauro Mobili–Pinarello
- Murella–Rossin
- Renault–Elf
- Sammontana–Campagnolo
- Santini–Conti–Galli
- Supermercati Brianzoli

== Pre-race favorites ==
Team managers when asked about the favorite entering the race felt there was no clear favorite to win. La Gazzetta dello Sport felt four riders – Francesco Moser (Gis Gelati–Tuc Lu), Laurent Fignon (Renault–Elf), Giuseppe Saronni (Del Tongo–Colnago), and Roberto Visentini (Carrera–Inoxpran) – had the best chances to win, but "there is no man who knows how to dominate." When asked about his biggest challenge, Moser stated: "First, Visentini, because last year he was second, he has a very homogeneous squad and is the Italian runner in better shape..." Ángel Ruocco of El País felt that the race would be between 1983 Tour de France champion Fignon and Saronni, the winner of the Giro the previous year. He added that Silvano Contini, Mario Beccia, and Fignon as other challengers. Marino Lejarreta (Alfa Lum–Olmo) who rode the 1984 Vuelta a España to prepare, as well as Alberto Fernández (Zor–Gemeaz Cusin) who displayed great results when the race reached the Apennines last year.

== Route and stages ==
The route for the 1984 edition of the Giro d'Italia was revealed to the public by head organizer Vincenzo Torriani on 18 February 1984. Covering a total of 3,808 km (2,366 mi), it included four time trials (three individual and one for teams), and eleven stages with categorized climbs that awarded mountains classification points. Five of these eleven stages had summit finishes: stage 3, to Madonna di San Luca; stage 5, to Blockhaus; stage 16, to Bardonecchia; stage 19, to Selva di Val Gardena; and stage 20, to Arabba. The organizers chose to include two rest days. When compared to the previous year's race, the race was 114 km (71 mi) shorter and contained the same number of time trials and rest days. In addition, this race contained the same number of stages.

Stage characteristics and winners
Stage	Date	Course	Distance	Type	Winner
P	17 May	Lucca	5 km (3 mi)	Individual time trial	Francesco Moser (ITA)
1	18 May	Lucca to Marina di Pietrasanta	55 km (34 mi)	Team time trial	Renault–Elf (Note: The teams that placed in the top 15 of the stage were awarded time bonuses. First place was given a two-minute-and-thirty-second time bonus to be split amongst its riders, second place was given a two-minute-and-twenty-second bonus, and each subsequent place received ten second less of a bonus than the team before, until the fifteenth place received only ten seconds.)
2	19 May	Marina di Pietrasanta to Florence	127 km (79 mi)	Plain stage	Urs Freuler (SUI)
3	20 May	Bologna to Madonna di San Luca	110 km (68 mi)	Stage with mountain(s)	Moreno Argentin (ITA)
4	21 May	Bologna to Numana	238 km (148 mi)	Plain stage	Stefan Mutter (SUI)
5	22 May	Numana to Blockhaus	194 km (121 mi)	Stage with mountain(s)	Moreno Argentin (ITA)
6	23 May	Chieti to Foggia	193 km (120 mi)	Plain stage	Francesco Moser (ITA)
7	24 May	Foggia to Marconia di Pisticci	226 km (140 mi)	Plain stage	Urs Freuler (SUI)
8	25 May	Policoro to Agropoli	228 km (142 mi)	Stage with mountain(s)	Urs Freuler (SUI)
9	26 May	Agropoli to Cava de' Tirreni	104 km (65 mi)	Stage with mountain(s)	Dag Erik Pedersen (NOR)
	27 May	Rest day			
10	28 May	Cava de' Tirreni to Isernia	209 km (130 mi)	Stage with mountain(s)	Martial Gayant (FRA)
11	29 May	Isernia to Rieti	243 km (151 mi)	Plain stage	Urs Freuler (SUI)
12	30 May	Rieti to Città di Castello	175 km (109 mi)	Plain stage	Paolo Rosola (ITA)
13	31 May	Città di Castello to Lerici	269 km (167 mi)	Stage with mountain(s)	Roberto Visentini (ITA)
14	1 June	Lerici to Alessandria	204 km (127 mi)	Stage with mountain(s)	Sergio Santimaria (ITA)
15	2 June	Certosa di Pavia to Milan	38 km (24 mi)	Individual time trial	Francesco Moser (ITA)
	3 June	Rest day			
16	4 June	Alessandria to Bardonecchia	198 km (123 mi)	Stage with mountain(s)	Dag Erik Pedersen (NOR)
17	5 June	Bardonecchia to Lecco	249 km (155 mi)	Plain stage	Jürg Bruggmann (SUI)
18	6 June	Lecco to Merano	252 km (157 mi)	Stage with mountain(s)	Bruno Leali (ITA)
19	7 June	Merano to Selva di Val Gardena	74 km (46 mi)	Stage with mountain(s)	Marino Lejarreta (ESP)
20	8 June	Selva di Val Gardena to Arabba	169 km (105 mi)	Stage with mountain(s)	Laurent Fignon (FRA)
21	9 June	Arabba to Treviso	208 km (129 mi)	Plain stage	Guido Bontempi (ITA)
22	10 June	Soave to Verona	42 km (26 mi)	Individual time trial	Francesco Moser (ITA)
	Total		3,808 km (2,366 mi)		

== Classification Leadership ==
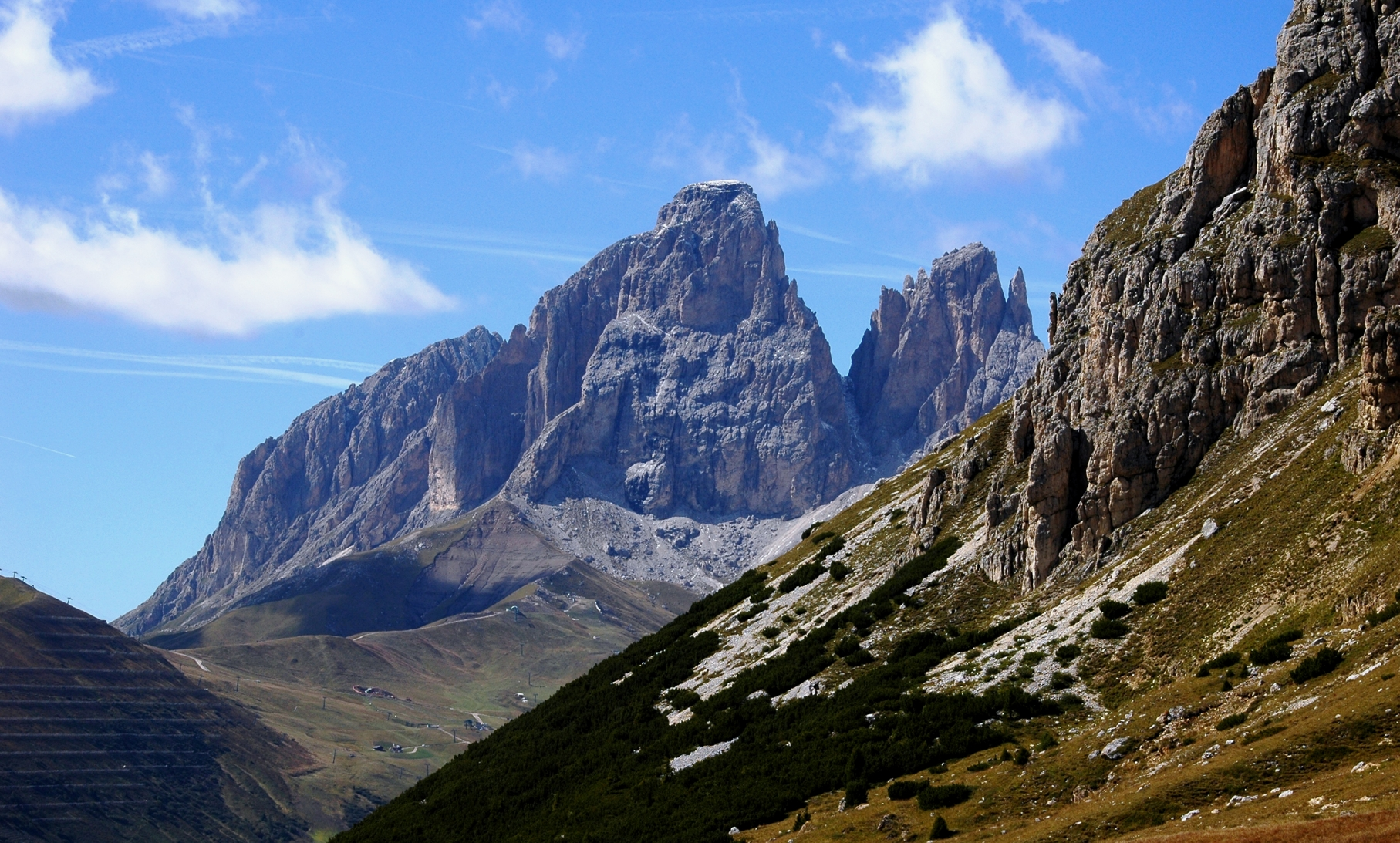
The Pordoi Pass was the Cima Coppi for the 1984 running of the Giro d'Italia.

Four different jerseys were worn during the 1984 Giro d'Italia. The leader of the general classification – calculated by adding the stage finish times of each rider, and allowing time bonuses for the first three finishers on mass-start stages – wore a pink jersey. This classification is the most important of the race, and its winner is considered as the winner of the Giro. Time bonuses of 20, 15, 10, and 5 seconds were awarded to each mass-start stage's first four finishers.

For the points classification, which awarded a purple (or cyclamen) jersey to its leader, cyclists were given points for finishing a stage in the top 15. No points were given at intermediate sprints.

The green jersey was awarded to the mountains classification leader. In this ranking, points were won by reaching the summit of a climb ahead of other cyclists. Each climb was ranked as either first, second or third category, with more points available for higher category climbs. The Cima Coppi, the race's highest point of elevation, awarded more points than the other first category climbs. The Cima Coppi for this Giro was the originally the Stelvio Pass, but it was changed to the Pordoi Pass. The first rider to cross the Pordoi Pass was French rider Laurent Fignon.

The white jersey was worn by the leader of young rider classification, a ranking decided the same way as the general classification, but considering only neo-professional cyclists (in their first three years of professional racing).

Although no jersey was awarded, there was also one classification for the teams, in which the stage finish times of the best three cyclists per team were added; the leading team was the one with the lowest total time. There was another team classification that awarded points to each team based on their riding's finishing position in every stage. The team with the highest total of points was the leader of the classification.

There were a few minor classifications. For example the Premio dell'Agonismo, an intermediate sprints classification, and the Fiat Uno classification (named after the Fiat Uno), where points were given to the riders who reached the final kilometer first. There was also a time trial award, for the rider with the lowest cumulative time in the individual time trials.

The rows in the following table correspond to the jerseys awarded after that stage was run.

Classification leadership by stage
Stage	Winner	General classification	Points classification	Mountains classification	Young rider classification	Team classification
P	Francesco Moser	Francesco Moser	not awarded	not awarded	not awarded	not awarded
1	Renault–Elf	Laurent Fignon	not awarded	not awarded	not awarded	Renault–Elf
2	Urs Freuler	Laurent Fignon	Urs Freuler	not awarded	Bruno Wojtinek	Renault–Elf
3	Moreno Argentin	Laurent Fignon	Moreno Argentin	Franco Chioccioli	Charly Mottet	Renault–Elf
4	Stefan Mutter	Laurent Fignon	Urs Freuler	Moreno Argentin	Charly Mottet	Renault–Elf
5	Moreno Argentin	Francesco Moser	Moreno Argentin	Moreno Argentin	Charly Mottet	Carrera–Inoxpran
6	Francesco Moser	Francesco Moser	Moreno Argentin	Moreno Argentin	Charly Mottet	Carrera–Inoxpran
7	Urs Freuler	Francesco Moser	Urs Freuler	Moreno Argentin	Charly Mottet	Carrera–Inoxpran
8	Urs Freuler	Francesco Moser	Urs Freuler	Moreno Argentin	Charly Mottet	Carrera–Inoxpran
9	Dag Erik Pedersen	Francesco Moser	Urs Freuler	Moreno Argentin	Charly Mottet	Carrera–Inoxpran
10	Martial Gayant	Francesco Moser	Urs Freuler	Flavio Zappi	Charly Mottet	Carrera–Inoxpran
11	Urs Freuler	Francesco Moser	Urs Freuler	Flavio Zappi	Charly Mottet	Carrera–Inoxpran
12	Paolo Rosola	Francesco Moser	Urs Freuler	Flavio Zappi	Charly Mottet	Carrera–Inoxpran
13	Roberto Visentini	Francesco Moser	Urs Freuler	Flavio Zappi	Charly Mottet	Carrera–Inoxpran
14	Sergio Santimaria	Francesco Moser	Urs Freuler	Flavio Zappi	Charly Mottet	Carrera–Inoxpran
15	Francesco Moser	Francesco Moser	Urs Freuler	Flavio Zappi	Charly Mottet	Carrera–Inoxpran
16	Dag Erik Pedersen	Francesco Moser	Urs Freuler	Flavio Zappi	Charly Mottet	Carrera–Inoxpran
17	Jürg Bruggmann	Francesco Moser	Urs Freuler	Flavio Zappi	Charly Mottet	Carrera–Inoxpran
18	Bruno Leali	Francesco Moser	Urs Freuler	Flavio Zappi	Charly Mottet	Carrera–Inoxpran
19	Marino Lejarreta	Francesco Moser	Urs Freuler	Flavio Zappi	Charly Mottet	Carrera–Inoxpran
20	Laurent Fignon	Laurent Fignon	Urs Freuler	Laurent Fignon	Charly Mottet	Renault–Elf
21	Guido Bontempi	Laurent Fignon	Johan van der Velde	Laurent Fignon	Charly Mottet	Renault–Elf
22	Francesco Moser	Francesco Moser	Urs Freuler	Laurent Fignon	Charly Mottet	Renault–Elf
Final		Francesco Moser	Urs Freuler	Laurent Fignon	Charly Mottet	Renault–Elf

== Final standings ==
Legend
Pink jersey	Denotes the winner of the General classification
Green jersey	Denotes the winner of the Mountains classification
Purple jersey	Denotes the winner of the Points classification
White jersey	Denotes the winner of the Young rider classification

=== General classification ===
Final general classification (1–10)
Rank	Name	Team	Time
1	Francesco Moser (ITA)	Gis Gelati–Tuc Lu	98h 32' 20"
2	Laurent Fignon (FRA)	Renault–Elf	+ 1' 03"
3	Moreno Argentin (ITA)	Sammontana	+ 4' 26"
4	Marino Lejarreta (ESP)	Alfa Lum–Olmo	+ 4' 33"
5	Johan van der Velde (NED)	Metauro Mobili	+ 6' 56"
6	Gianbattista Baronchelli (ITA)	Murella–Rossin	+ 7' 48"
7	Lucien Van Impe (BEL)	Metauro Mobili	+ 10' 19"
8	Beat Breu (SUI)	Cilo–Aufina	+ 11' 39"
9	Mario Beccia (ITA)	Malvor–Bottecchia	+ 11' 41"
10	Dag Erik Pedersen (NOR)	Murella–Rossin	+ 13' 35"

=== Points classification ===
Final points classification (1-5)
	Rider	Team	Points
1	Urs Freuler (SUI)	Carrera–Inoxpran	178
2	Johan van der Velde (NED)	Metauro Mobili	172
3	Francesco Moser (ITA)	Gis Gelati–Tuc Lu	166
4	Dag Erik Pedersen (NOR)	Murella–Rossin	160
5	Laurent Fignon (FRA)	Renault–Elf	150

=== Mountains classification ===
Final mountains classification (1-5)
	Rider	Team	Points
1	Laurent Fignon (FRA)	Renault–Elf	53
2	Flavio Zappi (ITA)	Metauro Mobili	40
3	Moreno Argentin (ITA)	Sammontana	30
4	Johan van der Velde (NED)	Metauro Mobili	29
5	Jesús Rodríguez Magro (ESP)	Zor–Gemeaz Cusin	28

=== Young rider classification ===
Final young rider classification (1-5)
	Rider	Team	Time
1	Charly Mottet (FRA)	Renault–Elf	99h 02' 11"
2	Jens Veggerby (DEN)	Fanini–Wührer	+ 3' 59"
3	Giocondo Dalla Rizza (ITA)	Supermercati Brianzoli	+ 10' 19"
4	Elio Festa (ITA)	Santini–Conti–Galli	+ 10' 52"
5	Jesús Ignacio Ibáñez Loyo (ESP)	Zor–Gemeaz Cusin	+ 15' 47"

=== Time trial classification ===
Final time trial classification (1-5)
	Rider	Team	Time
1	Francesco Moser (ITA)	Gis Gelati–Tuc Lu	1h 43' 10"
2	Urs Freuler (SUI)	Carrera–Inoxpran	+ 4' 26"
3	Laurent Fignon (FRA)	Renault–Elf	+ 4' 27"
4	Daniel Gisiger (SUI)	Atala	+ 5' 10"
5	Moreno Argentin (ITA)	Sammontana	+ 5' 47"

=== Trofeo Fiat Uno classification ===
Final Trofeo Fiat Uno classification (1-5)
	Rider	Team	Points
1	Dante Morandi (ITA)	Atala	18
2	Johan van der Velde (NED)	Metauro Mobili	12
3	Laurent Fignon (FRA)	Renault–Elf	10
4	Marino Lejarreta (ESP)	Alfa Lum–Olmo	9
5	Mario Noris (ITA)	Atala	8
5	Bruno Leali (ITA)	Carrera–Inoxpran	8

=== Premio dell'Agonismo classification ===
Final Premio dell'Agonismo classification (1-4)
	Rider	Team	Points
1	Daniel Gisiger (SUI)	Atala	24
2	Giovanni Renosto (ITA)	Murella-Rosin	15
3	Steen-Michael Petersen (DEN)	Fanini–Wührer	11
4	Alf Segersäll (SWE)	Atala	8
4	Juan Fernández (ESP)	Zor–Gemeaz Cusin	8

=== Team classification ===
Final team classification (1-5)
	Team	Time
1	Renault–Elf	293h 48' 45"
2	Murella–Rossin	+ 2' 34"
3	Carrera–Inoxpran	+ 27' 41"
4	Del Tongo–Colnago	+ 40' 30"
5	Alfa Lum–Olmo	+ 40' 46"

=== Team points classification ===
Final team points classification (1-3)
	Team	Points
1	Metauro Mobili	351
2	Atala–Campagnolo	336
3	Murella–Rossin	281

== Aftermath ==
Since the race's conclusion, the race has been marred by accusations of race officials favoring Francesco Moser. On several occasions, Moser was seen drafting behind team cars and being pushed up mountains which is not allowed in the race rules. Moser was not penalized the times he committed the violations, but several other riders in the race were punished by officials when they committed the same infractions. Renault manager Cyrille Guimard especially upset with Moser's lack of punishment because his rider, Fignon, was awarded a twenty-second penalty for receiving food outside of the feed zone. Another instance appeared when the race officials cancelled the crossing of the Stelvio Pass during the eighteenth stage. Snow had fallen on the Stelvio and was thought to be able to be cleared by the day of the stage as race director Vincenzo Torriani had photos showing that it could be done. The French magazine Vélo published photos of the pass being clear of snow and open to the public. However, the day before the stage, the snow had yet to be cleared. There's speculation that a government official from Trent – Moser's hometown – would not allow the Giro to cross the Stelvio. The race was re-routed to go over the Tonale Pass and Palade Pass. The changes in the stage resulted in another collective finish of the general classification contenders, thus keeping the time gaps the same and playing into the hand of Moser. 1986 race winner Roberto Visentini quit the race because he felt the it was being fixed.. In the final time trial, TV helicopters have been accused of flying low behind Moser in order to propel him forward, increasing his speed. Fignon told the media that the helicopters were flying in front of him in order to slow his pace.

Fignon later published an autobiography in 2010 entitled We Were Young and Carefree: The Autobiography of Laurent Fignon where he discussed this edition of the Giro. He wrote that the "breaches in the rules were obvious" and that Moser had received many pushes from spectators while climbing during the twentieth stage. Fignon elaborated on the final time trial, stating that the helicopter pilot "almost mowing the number off of my back with his rotorblades." He stated the helicopter's turbulence slowed him down and also nearly crashed him a few times during the stage. Ultimately, Fignon felt that if the entire race was run according to the route and abiding by the rules, he would've won the race. In 2015, Moser was inducted to the Giro d'Italia Hall of Fame. At the ceremony, he received a replica of the modern-day trophy for his victory in the race. Moser spoke of how he and Fignon talked years after the race and he still blamed his victory on the helicopter, while Moser insisted that the cheering from the crowds is what motivated him to perform so well during the day. He further commented on Fignon: "Poor Fignon! He lost two Grand Tours on the last day and in time trials, too. If either of those races had ended with a climb, it would have been a very different story."
