= Gianni Motta–Linea M.D. Italia =

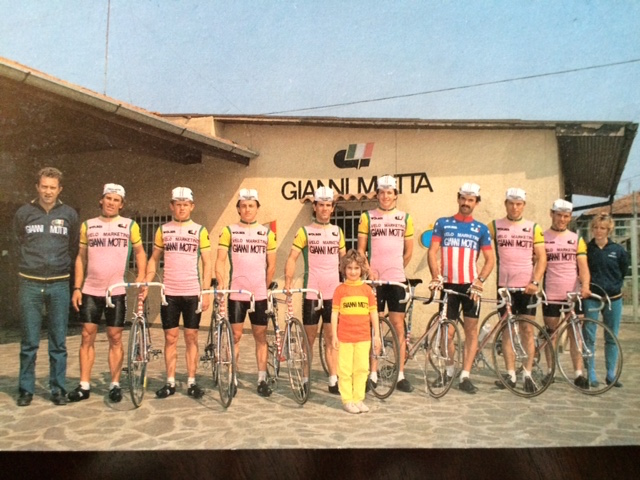

Team information
- Registered: United States
- Founded: 1984
- Disbanded: 1984
- Discipline: Road
- Bicycles: Gianni Motta

Key personnel
- Team manager: Robin Morton

Gianni Motta–Linea M.D. Italia was an American professional cycling team that competed in the 1984 Giro d'Italia, becoming the first American registered team to compete in the race. The concept of the team was first formed by John Eustice, a rider, and Robin Morton who became the team's manager. The team was sponsored by Gianni Motta's bicycle brand, which was just starting to be distributed in the United States, and also sponsored by Italian furniture maker Linea MD.

== Major wins ==
1984
Luxembourg National Road Race Claude Michely

== Roster ==
Ages as of 1 January 1984.

Rider	Date of birth
Michael Carter (USA)	March 3, 1963 (aged 20)
Gavin Chilcott (USA)	April 16, 1962 (aged 21)
Alain Dallenbach (SUI)	April 7, 1956 (aged 27)
John Eustice (USA)	August 6, 1956 (aged 27)
Daniel Franger (USA)	April 23, 1959 (aged 24)
Yehuda Gershoni (ISR)	July 14, 1960 (aged 23)
Ron Hayman (CAN)	August 31, 1954 (aged 29)
Sigmund Hermann (LIE)	May 17, 1959 (aged 24)
Guy Janiszewski (BEL)	January 24, 1959 (aged 24)
Karl Maxon (USA)	October 9, 1959 (aged 24)

Rider	Date of birth
Claude Michely (LUX)	November 8, 1959 (aged 24)
Tim Rutledge (USA)	October 17, 1958 (aged 25)
Jeff Rutter (USA)	April 26, 1961 (aged 22)
Greg Saunders (USA)	June 4, 1959 (aged 24)
Frank Scioscia (USA)	January 18, 1961 (aged 22)
Dag Selander (NOR)	November 21, 1955 (aged 28)
Steve Speaks (USA)	July 2, 1962 (aged 21)
Marcel Summermatter (SUI)	March 4, 1956 (aged 27)
Eugène Urbany (NED)	July 13, 1957 (aged 26)
Rudi Weber (GER)	January 17, 1958 (aged 25)

== National Champions ==
1984
Luxembourg Road Race, Claude Michely
