= Soave, Veneto =

Soave
- Comune
- Comune di Soave
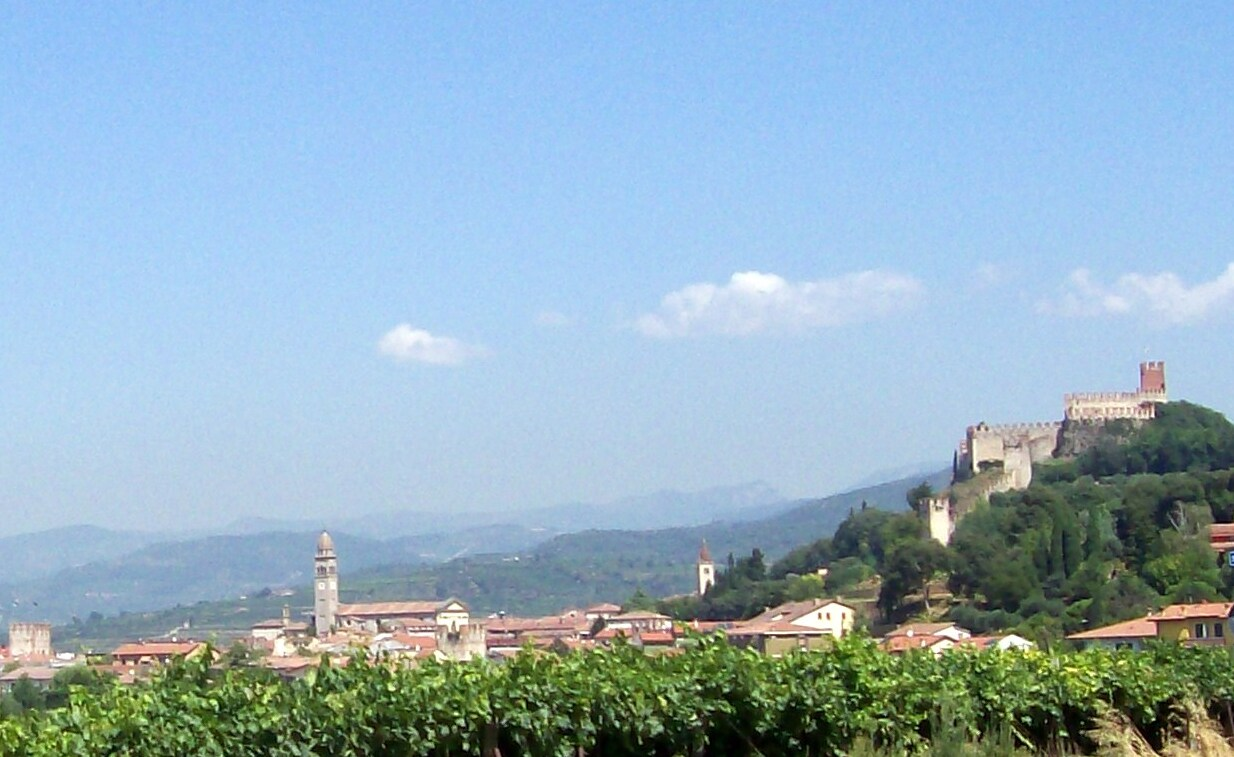
- Panorama

- Coat of arms

- Location within Italy Location within Veneto
- Coordinates: 45°25′N 11°14′E
- Country: Italy
- Region: Veneto
- Province: province of Verona (VR)
- Frazioni: Castelcerino, Castelletto, Costeggiola, Fittà

Government
  - Mayor: Roberto Montanari from 13/02/2026 (Civic List Centre-right)

Area
  - Total: 22.67 km^{2} (8.75 sq mi)
- Elevation: 40 m (130 ft)

Population (1 October 2009)
  - Total: 6,893
  - Density: 304.1/km^{2} (787.5/sq mi)
- Demonym: Soavesi
- Time zone: UTC+1 (CET)
  - Summer (DST): UTC+2 (CEST)
- Postal code: 37038, 37030
- Dialing code: 045
- Patron saint: St. Lawrence
- Saint day: August 10
- Website: Official website

Soave is a comune of the Veneto region in the Province of Verona, northern Italy, with a population of roughly 6,800 people.

It is known above all for its Scaligeri Castle and for the typical wine that bears its name.

== Geography ==
Soave is located approximately 23 kilometres (14 miles) east of Verona and is reachable by use of the A4 motorway exit Soave-San Bonifacio.

== History ==
Soave was a Roman center on the via Postumia that connected Aquileia to Genoa. There are different theories about the origin of current name: according to one theory, it could derive from the Suebi (sometimes called Soavi in medieval Italian).

The castle was cited for the first time in occasion of the Magyar invasions (934). In the 13th century it was a possession of the Counts Bonifacio, which installed a capitano here. The walls still visible today, were built in 1379 by Cansignorio of the Scaliger family. Their rule was followed by those of the Visconti of Milan and the Carraresi from Padua; the latter lost Soave in 1405 to the Republic of Venice. In 1439 Visconti troops under Niccolò Piccinino captured it back, but Venice regained it soon. During the War of the League of Cambrai (1508), the city was fired and 366 Soavesi killed, but again in 1515 it was reacquired by Venice, which later sold the castle to the Gritti noble family.

In 1797–1805 the city was under French rule. In 1809 there were small fights between French and Austrian troops in the vicinity. Later Soave was included in the kingdom of Lombardy–Venetia, and in 1866 became part of Italy.

== Main sights ==
=== Castle ===
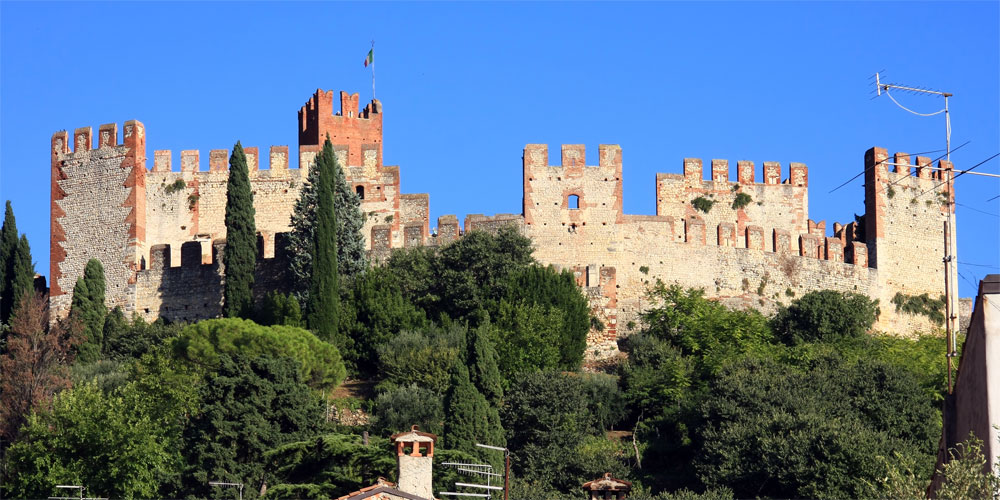
View of the Castle of Soave

The Castle of Soave is a typical medieval military edifice, commanding the neighbourhood of the city from the Tenda Hill. It comprises a mastio (donjon) and three lines of walls forming three courts of different size. The outer line, with a gate and a drawbridge, is the most recent, built by the Venetians in the 15th century. It houses the remains of a small church from the 10th century.

The second and larger court, the first of the original castle, is called della Madonna for a fresco portraying St. Mary (1321). Another fresco is visible after the door leading to the inner court, and portrays a Scaliger soldier. The mastio is the most impressive feature of the castle. Bones found within showed it was used also as prison and place of torture.

The House called del Capitano (the Scaliger commander) houses Roman coins, weapons parts, medals and other ancient remains found during the most recent restoration. Adjacent is a bedroom with a 13th-century fresco with St. Mary and Madeleine and a dining room with medieval kitchenware. Another room houses the portraits of the most famous Scaliger figures: Mastino I, Cangrande, Cansignorio and Taddea da Carrara, wife of Mastino II; the portrait of Dante Alighieri testify an alleged sojourn of the poet in the castle.

=== Others ===
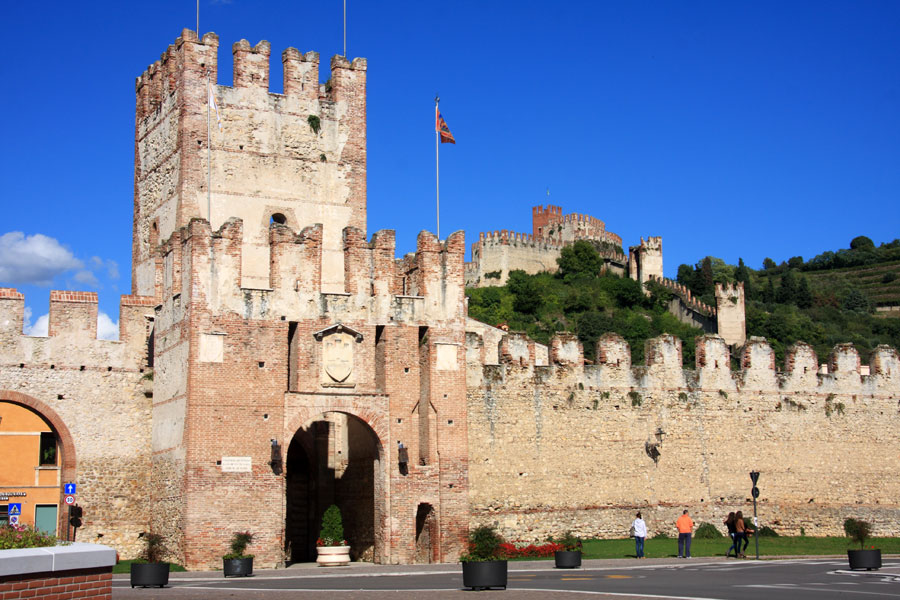
View of the Gate Verona and Castle of Soave

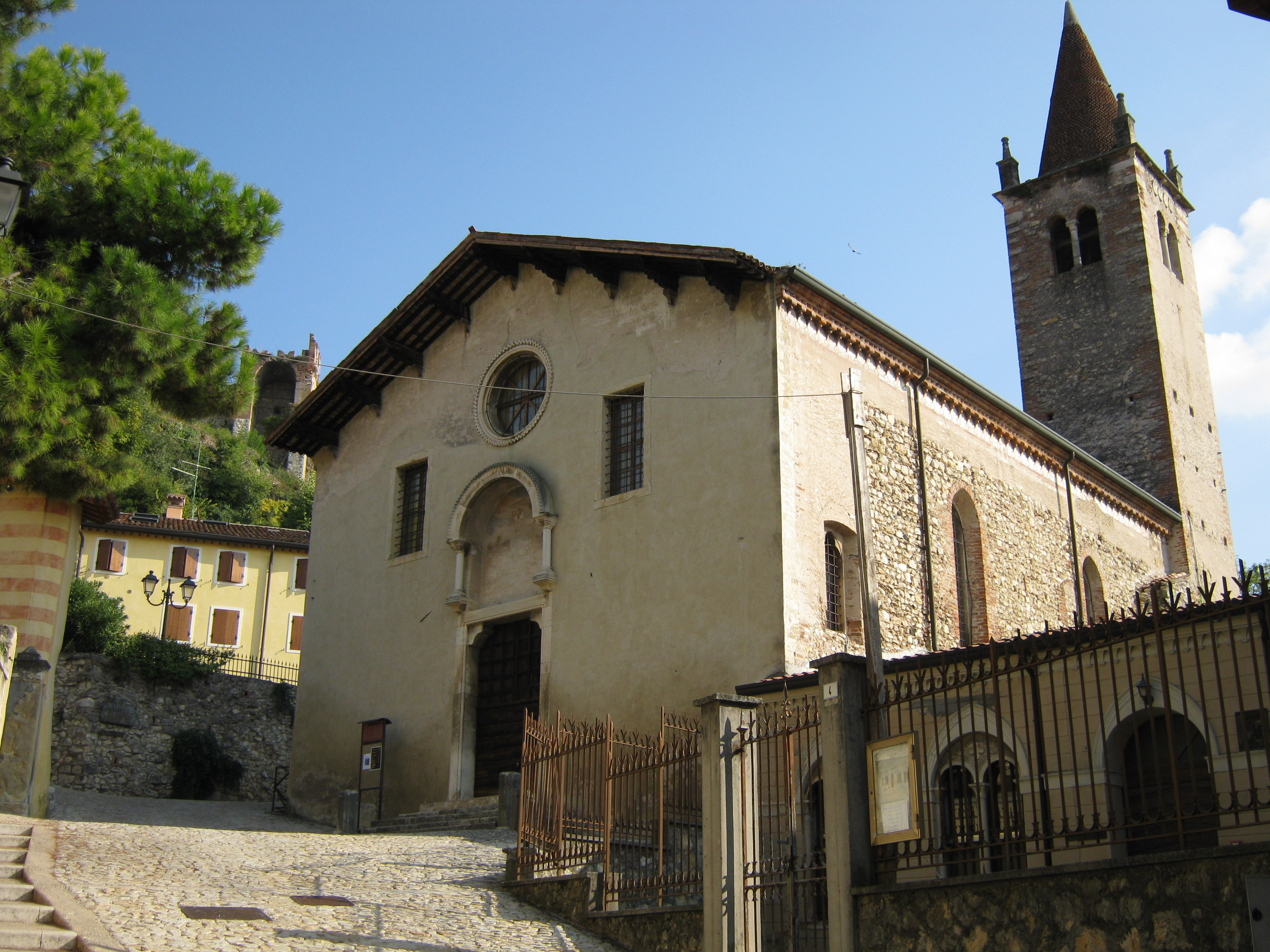
Santa Maria dei Domenicani

- The Scaliger Walls, built by Cansignorio della Scala, have a length of about 1,600 meters with a total of 24 towers. In origin there were three gates (Porta Aquila, now Porta Bassano, Porta Vicentina and Porta Verona). Two sides (west and south) are backed by a moat.
- Palazzo di Giustizia ("Justice Palace"), built in 1375 by Cansignorio della Scala.
- Scaliger Palace, near Porta Aquila, also commissioned by Cansignorio. It was the residence of the pretori and governors of the city and, during the Venetian rule, of the Capitani. It a noteworthy garden.
- Palazzo Cavalli (1411). The façade in Venetian Gothic architecture had once frescoes with mythological figures attributed to Giovanni Maria Falconetto.
- The Chiesa Parrocchiale (Parish Church). Built in 1758 over the pre-existing main church, and enlarged in 1884, it houses precious 16th paintings. The belltower has 9 famous bells in C# ringed in Veronese bellringing art.
- Santa Maria dei Domenicani church (1443, later rebuilt in the same century).
- Church of San Rocco, built in the 15th century of a Roman cemetery.
- The church of San Giorgio. Until the plague of 1630 housed 15th–16th century, now almost entirely lost.
- The Sanctuary of Santa Maria della Bassanella, consecrated in 1098 and renovated in the 20th century. It has noteworthy frescoes (14th century) depicting St. Benedict, St. Scholastica and other saints.

== Gallery ==
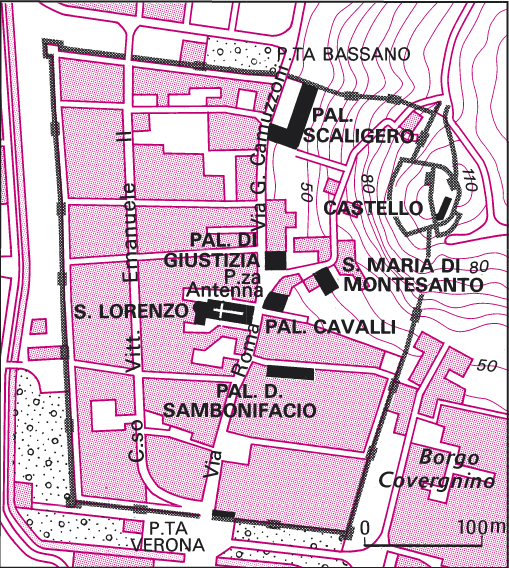
Plan of the city center

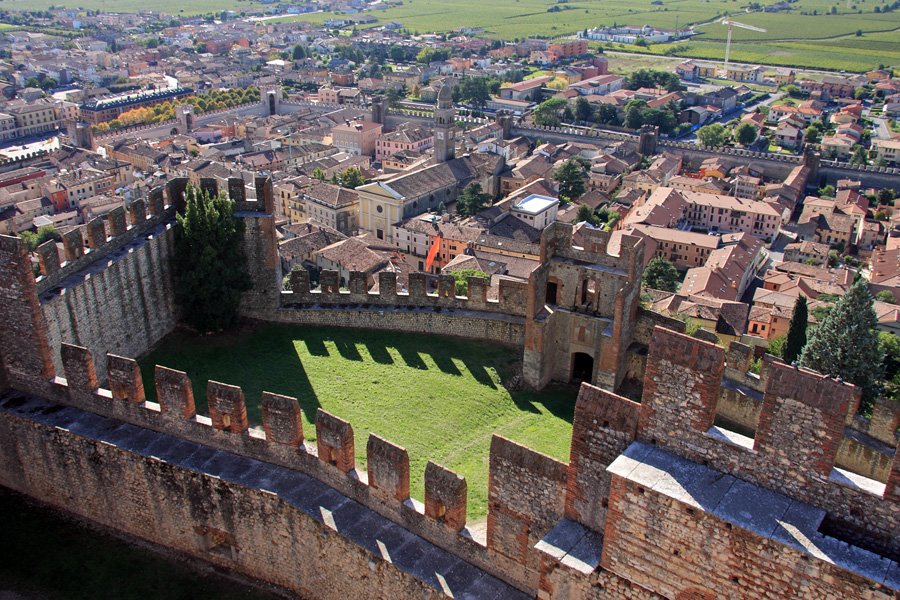
View from the castle

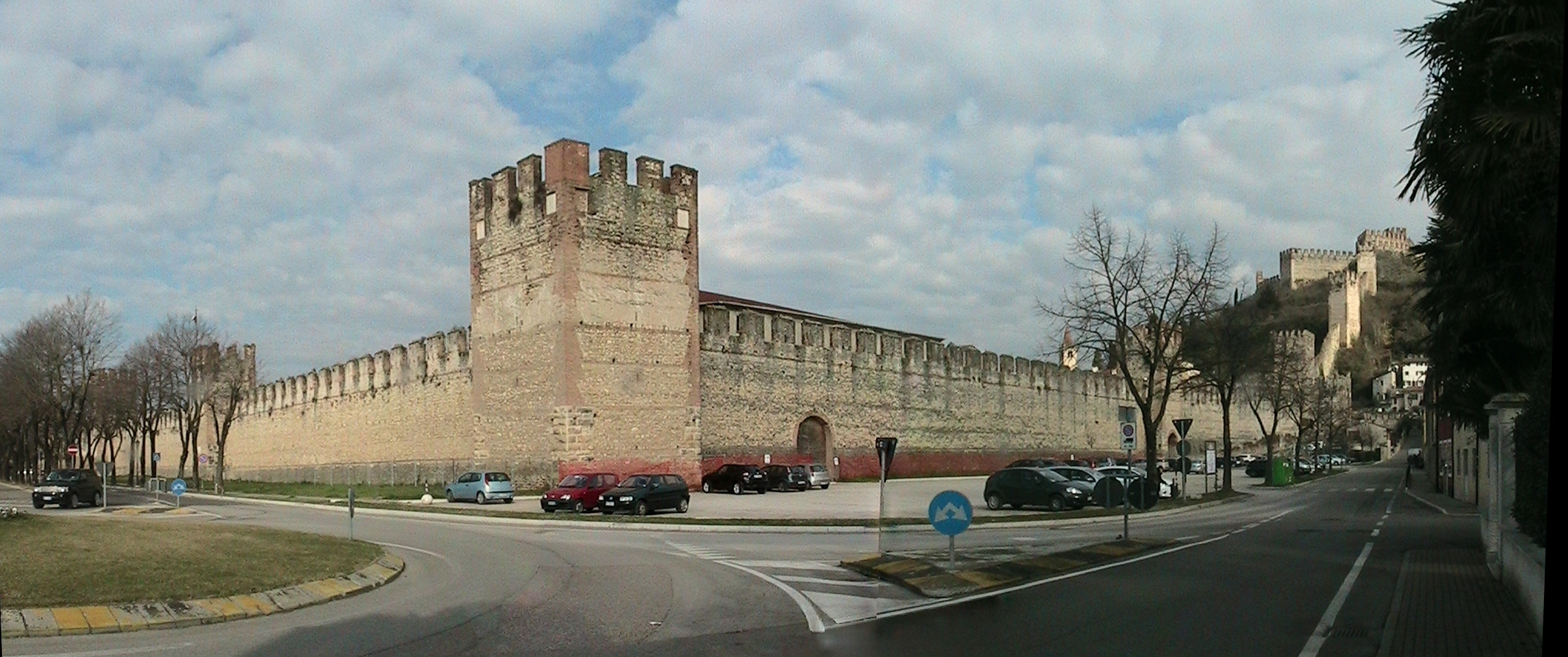
The Scaliger Walls (view sud)

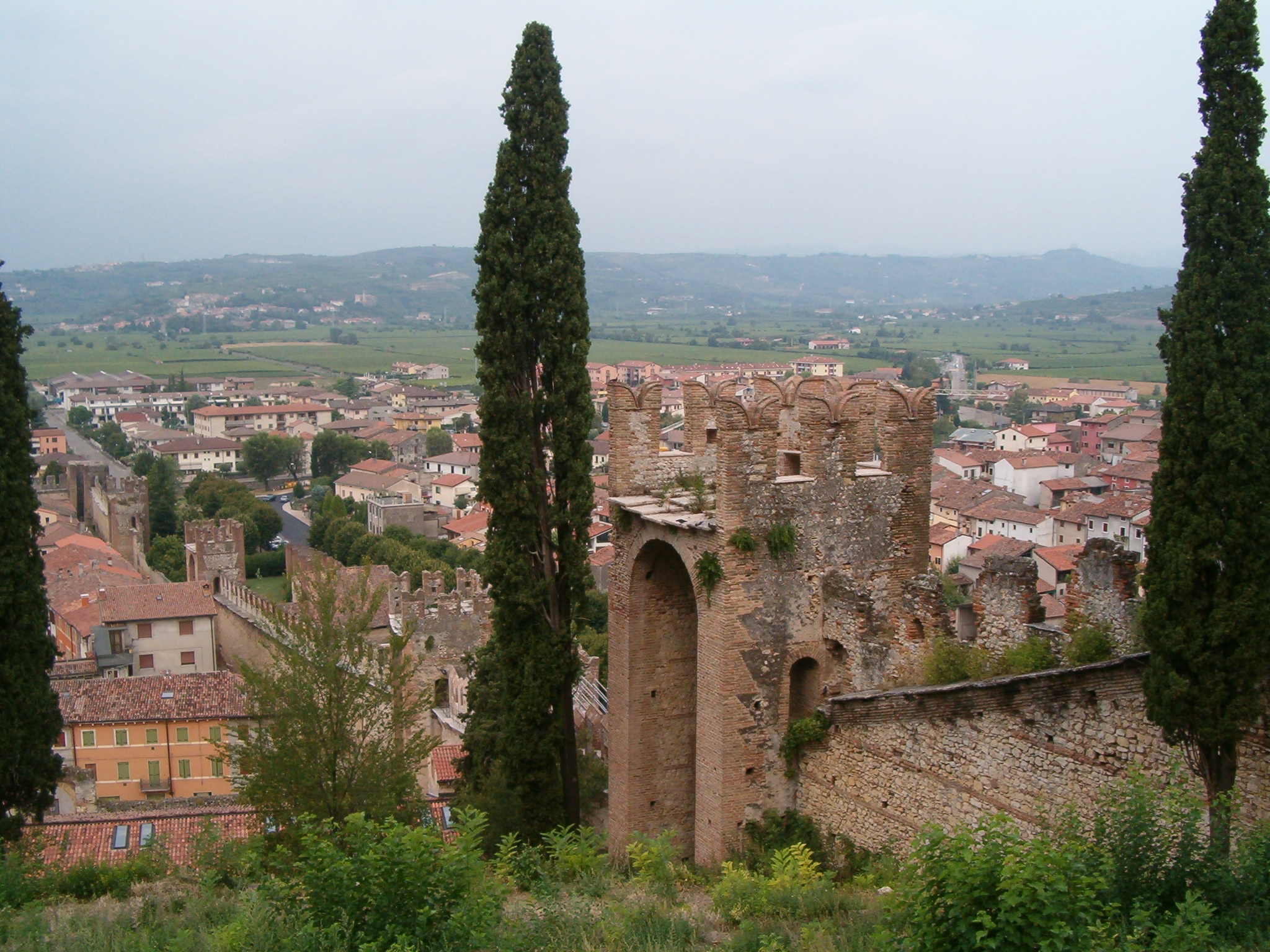
The Scaliger Walls (view nord)

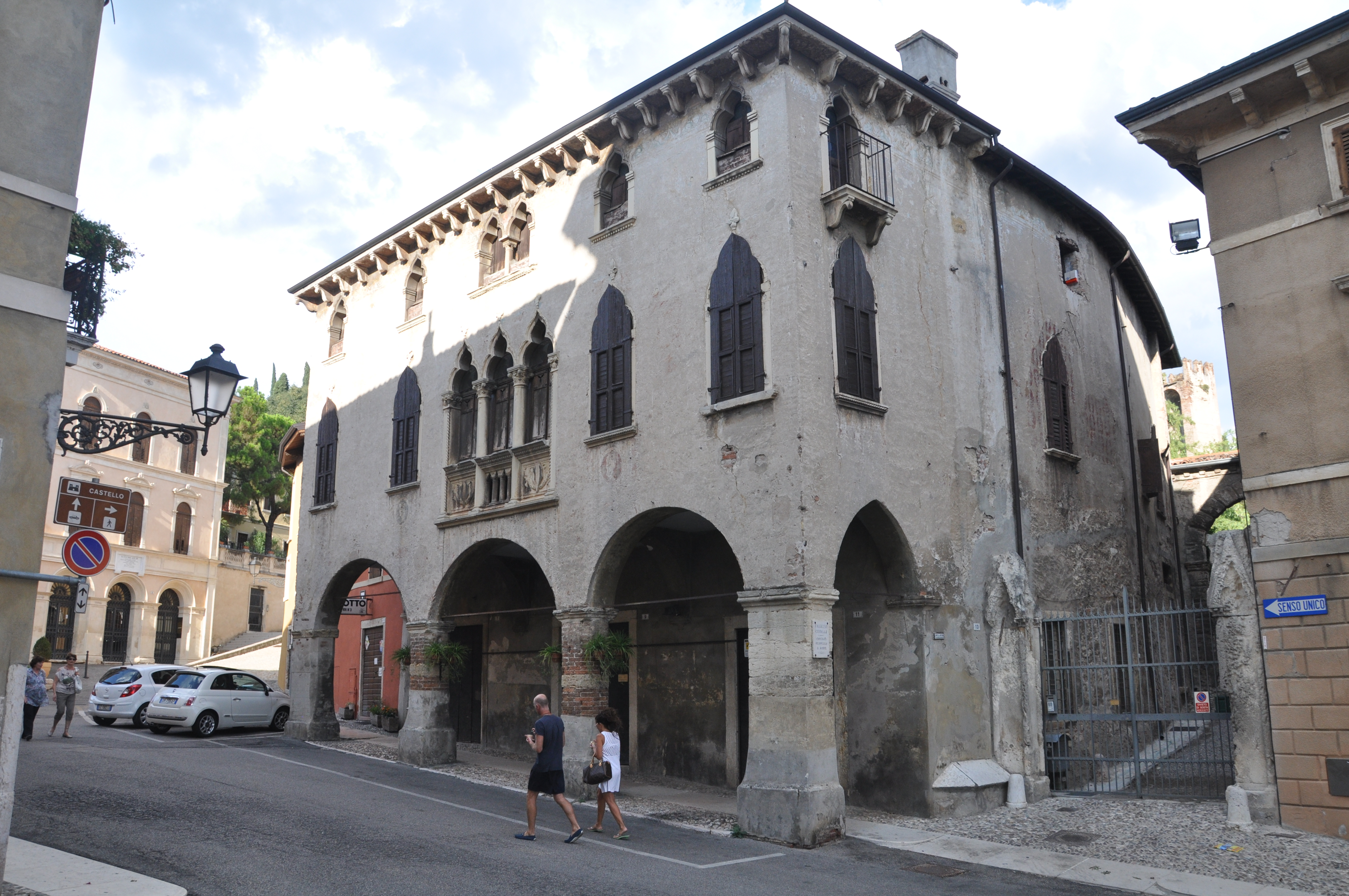
Palazzo Cavalli, built in 1411

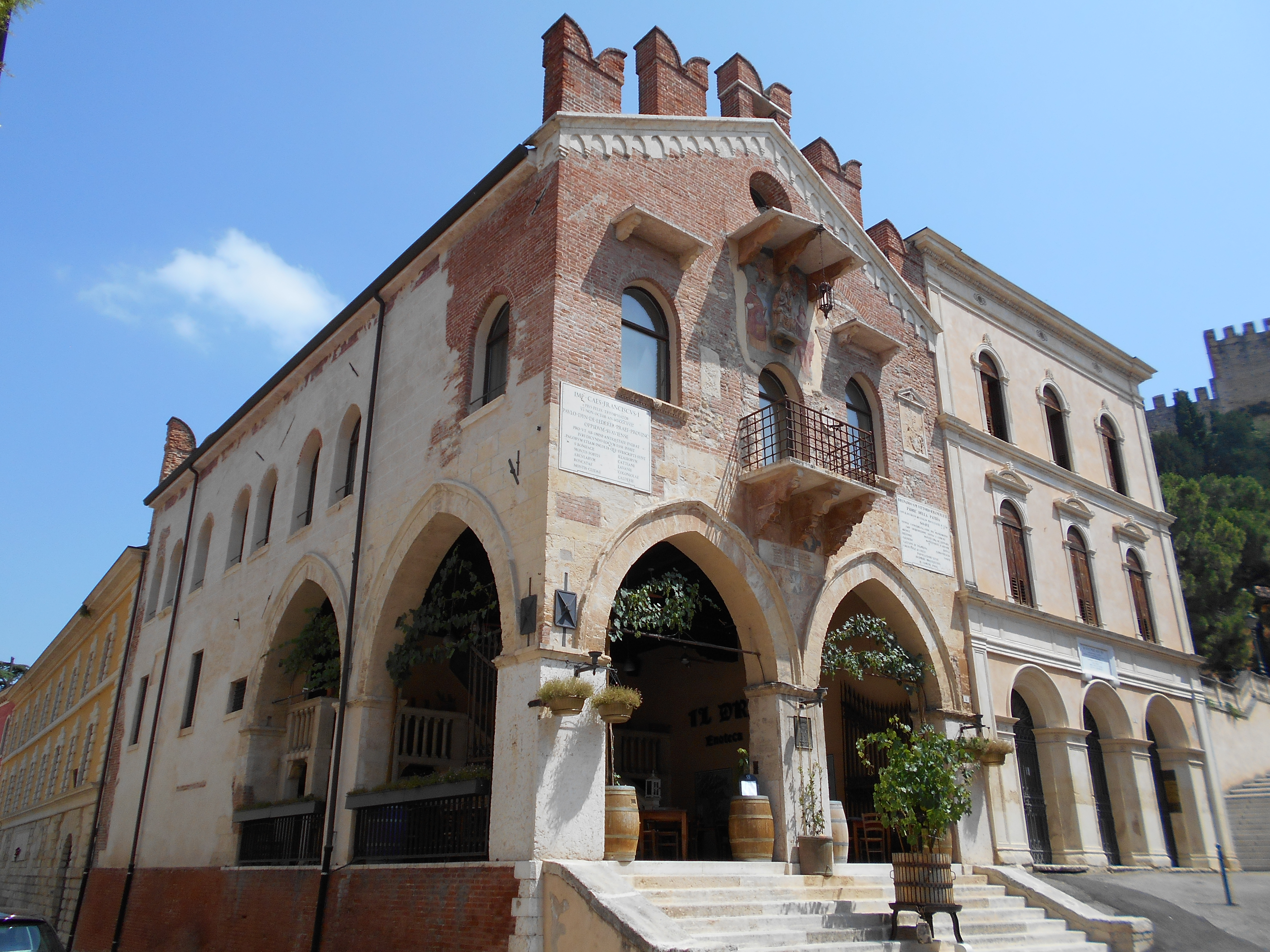
Justice Palace, built in 1375

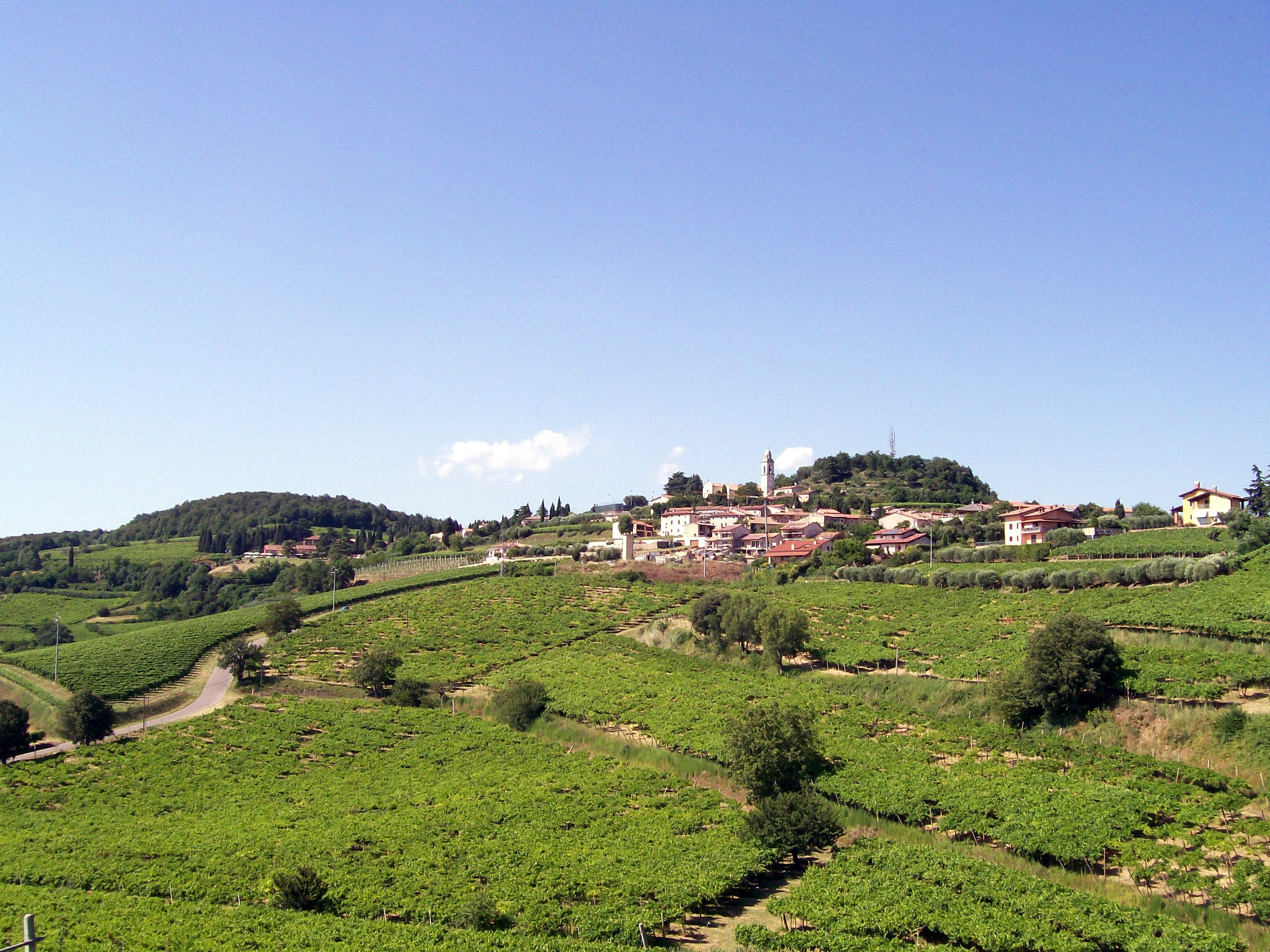
Castelcerino (frazione)

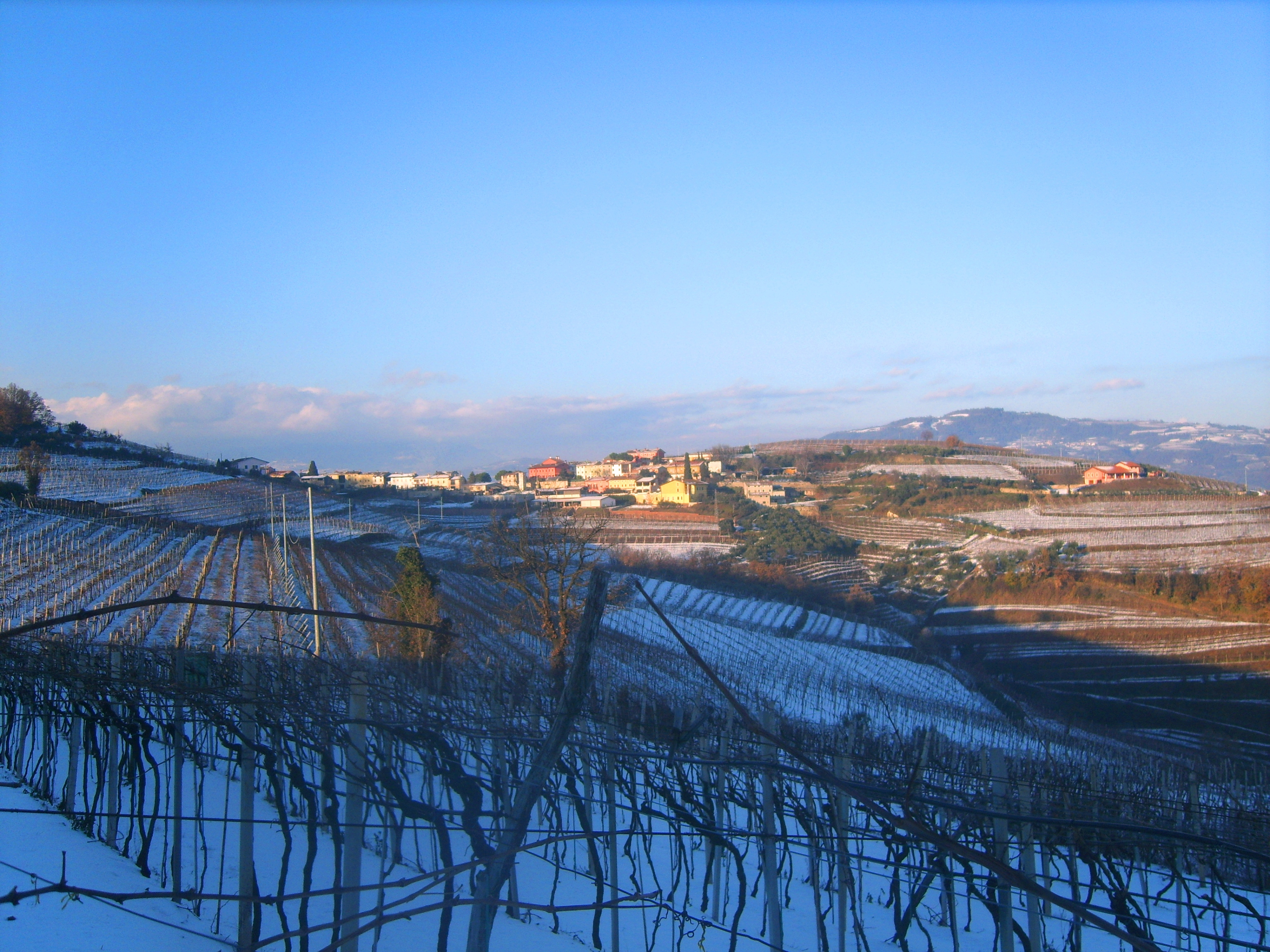
Vineyards in winter

== Twin towns ==
Soave is twinned with:

- Claye-Souilly, France
- Kelheim, Germany

== See also ==
- Soave (wine)
