= Jürg Bruggmann =

Swiss cyclist (born 1960)

Personal information
- Born: 1 October 1960 (age 66) Sulgen, Switzerland

Cycling career
- Sport: Cycling
- Current team: Retired
- Discipline: Road
- Role: Rider

Professional teams
- 1983–1985: Malvor–Bottecchia
- 1986: Cilo–Aufina
- 1987–1988: Teka
- 1989–1990: Frank-Toyo

Jürg Bruggmann (born 1 October 1960 in Sulgen) is a Swiss former cyclist.

== Major results ==
1984
1st Stage 17 Giro d'Italia
3rd Giro di Campania
1985
3rd Tour de Berne
1986
2nd Tour de Berne
3rd Grand Prix d'Ouverture La Marseillaise
1987
1st Stage 2b Tour de l'Oise
1988
1st Stage 1 Tour de l'Oise
1989
3rd Coppa Sabatini
1990
2nd Overall Schwanenbrau Cup

1st Stage 1
