= Fanini–Seven Up =

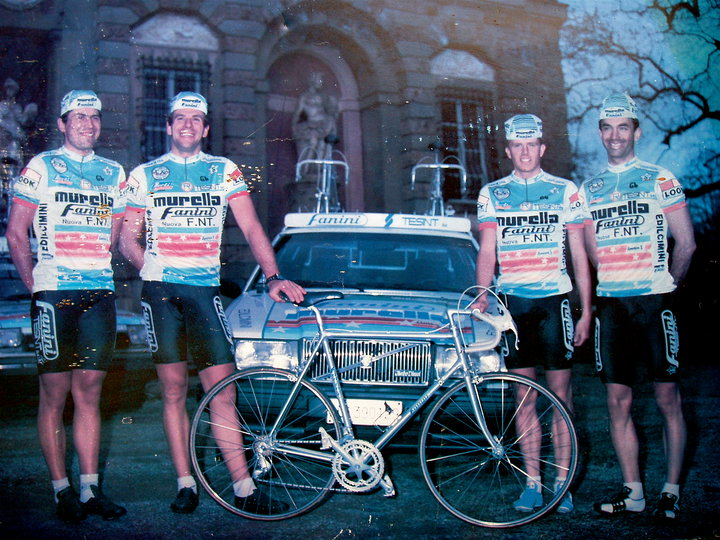

Team information
- Registered: Italy
- Founded: 1984
- Disbanded: 1988
- Discipline: Road

Team name history
- 1984–1985 1986 1987 1988: Murella–Rossin; Murella–Fanini; Remac-Fanini; Fanini–Seven Up

Fanini–Seven Up was an Italian professional cycling team that existed from 1984 to 1992.

The team went through several different name changes before being known as Fanini–Seven Up for its final season.

In 1984, the team was named as Murella - Rossin, with the bicycles supplied by Rossin Bikes during the 1984-1984 seasons.

The team was selected to race in five editions of the Giro d'Italia, where they achieved four stage wins as well as the young rider classification in 1988 by Stefano Tomasini.
