= Elio Festa =

Italian cyclist

Personal information
- Born: 10 October 1960 (age 66) Riolo Terme, Italy

Cycling career
- Sport: Cycling
- Role: Rider

Elio Festa (born 10 October 1960) is an Italian former professional racing cyclist. He rode in one edition of the Tour de France and three editions of the Giro d'Italia.
